= Isaiah Wilkins =

American basketball player (born 1995)

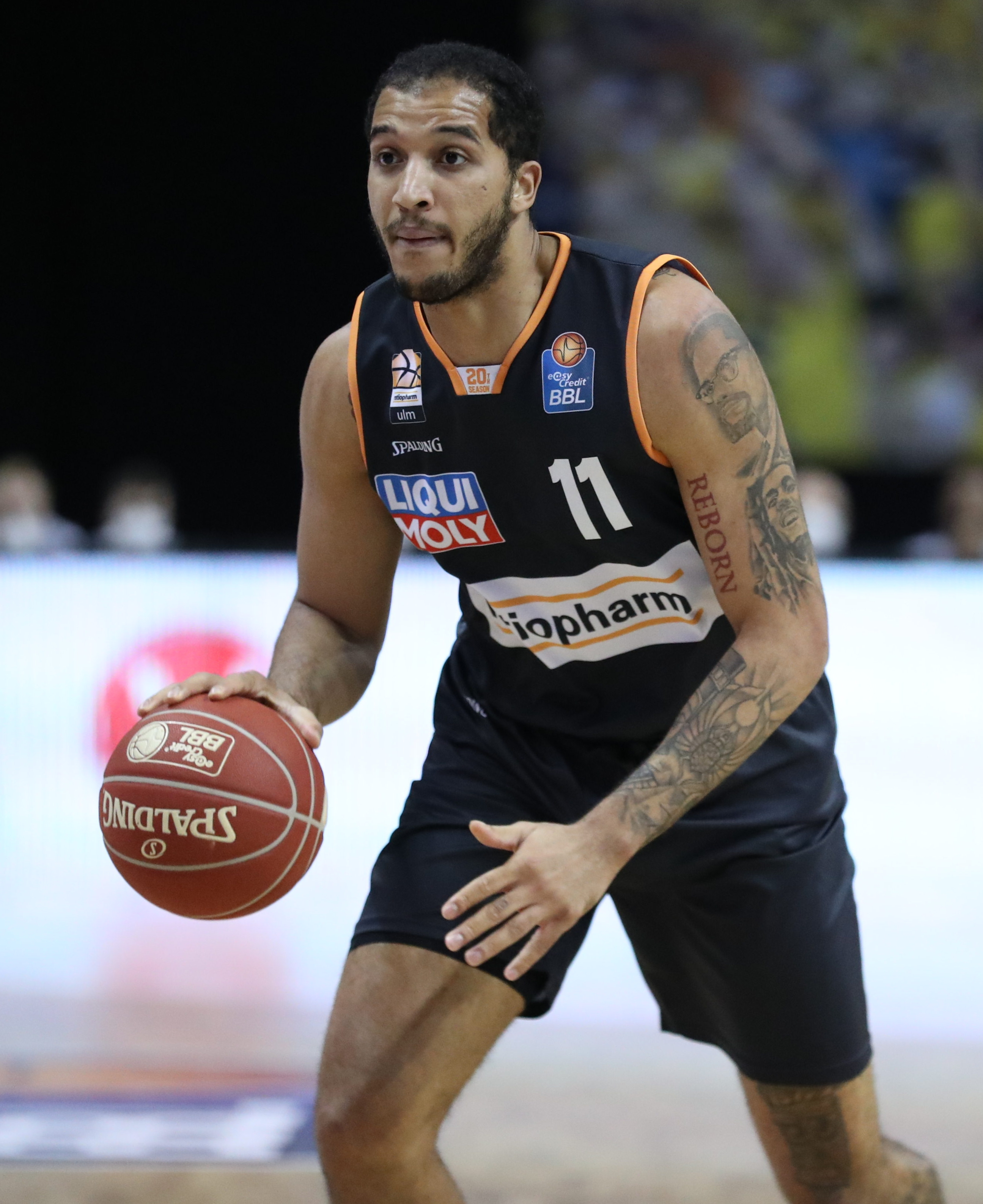
- Wilkins in 2021

Milwaukee Bucks
- Title: Assistant coach
- League: NBA

Personal information
- Born: September 23, 1995 (age 31) Lilburn, Georgia, U.S.
- Listed height: 6 ft 8 in (2.03 m)
- Listed weight: 205 lb (93 kg)

Career information
- High school: Greater Atlanta Christian (Norcross, Georgia)
- College: Virginia (2014–2018)
- NBA draft: 2018: undrafted
- Playing career: 2018–2021
- Position: Forward
- Number: 21, 97, 17, 91, 11
- Coaching career: 2021–present

Career history

Playing
- 2018–2019: Greensboro Swarm
- 2019: Canterbury Rams
- 2019–2020: Polpharma Starogard Gdański
- 2020–2021: ratiopharm Ulm

Coaching
- 2021–2024: Virginia (GA)
- 2024–2025: Virginia (assistant)
- 2025–2026: California (assistant)
- 2026–present: Milwaukee Bucks (assistant)

Career highlights
- NBL Defensive Player of the Year (2019); ACC Defensive Player of the Year (2018)
- Stats at Basketball Reference

Isaiah Wilkins (born September 23, 1995) is an American basketball coach and former player, who is an assistant coach for the Milwaukee Bucks of the National Basketball Association (NBA). Wilkins previously served as a graduate assistant for the University of Virginia men's basketball team.

== College career ==
In college, Wilkins made the ACC All-Defensive Team in 2017 and 2018, and was named that conference's Defensive Player of the Year in 2018. As a senior in 2017–18, Wilkins averaged 6.0 points, 6.2 rebounds, 1.6 assists, 1.2 steals and 1.4 blocks per game.

== Professional career ==
=== Greensboro Swarm (2018–2019) ===
After going undrafted in the 2018 NBA draft, Wilkins joined the Houston Rockets for the 2018 NBA Summer League, but was removed without reason. On July 26, 2018, Wilkins joined the Charlotte Hornets on a training camp deal. He was waived by the Hornets on October 11. He subsequently was added to the roster of the Hornets’ NBA G League affiliate, the Greensboro Swarm.

=== Canterbury Rams (2019) ===
On March 20, 2019, Wilkins signed with the Canterbury Rams for the 2019 New Zealand NBL season. He was named the NBL Defensive Player of the Year.

=== Polpharma Starogard Gdański (2019–2020) ===
On August 17, 2019, Wilkins signed with Polpharma Starogard Gdański of the Polish Basketball League.

=== ratiopharm Ulm (2020–2021) ===
On July 31, 2020, he has signed with Ratiopharm Ulm of the German Basketball Bundesliga. Wilkins would play for ratiopharm Ulm for 11 months before returning to UVA as a coach, putting a finish to his playing career.

== Coaching career ==
=== Virginia (2021–2025) ===
On June 15, 2021, Wilkins announced that he would be returning to UVA as a graduate assistant while he will be pursuing a master's degree in UVA's School of Education and Human Development.

After Tony Bennett left Virginia, Wilkins was promoted to full-time assistant coach for the 2024–25 season under interim head coach Ron Sanchez. After the season, Wilkins was not retained by newly appointed head coach Ryan Odom, officially ending his tenure with Virginia.

=== California (2025–2026) ===
On April 21, 2025, Wilkins was hired as an assistant coach by California under head coach Mark Madsen.

=== Milwaukee Bucks (2026–present) ===
On August 7, 2026, Wilkins was hired to serve as an assistant player development coach for the Milwaukee Bucks under head coach Taylor Jenkins.

== Career statistics ==
Legend
GP	Games played	GS	Games started	MPG	Minutes per game
FG%	Field goal percentage	3P%	3-point field goal percentage	FT%	Free throw percentage
RPG	Rebounds per game	APG	Assists per game	SPG	Steals per game
BPG	Blocks per game	PPG	Points per game	**Bold**	Career high

=== College ===
Year	Team	GP	GS	MPG	FG%	3P%	FT%	RPG	APG	SPG	BPG	PPG
2014–15	Virginia	28	0	9.4	.396	**.667**	.545	2.5	.4	.2	.6	1.6
2015–16	Virginia	**37**	21	21.4	.518	.000	.583	4.1	1.5	.8	.8	4.6
2016–17	Virginia	33	28	26.5	**.556**	.571	.702	6.0	1.1	1.0	1.3	**6.8**
2017–18	Virginia	34	**34**	27.5	.485	.176	**.756**	**6.2**	**1.6**	**1.2**	**1.4**	6.0
Career		132	83	21.7	.508	.300	.671	4.8	1.2	.8	1.1	4.9

== Personal life ==
Wilkins is the stepson of Naismith Basketball Hall of Fame inductee Dominique Wilkins.
