= 2015–16 Virginia Cavaliers men's basketball team =

American college basketball season

2015–16 Virginia Cavaliers men's basketball

Charleston Classic champions

NCAA tournament, Elite Eight
- Conference: Atlantic Coast Conference

Ranking
- Coaches: No. 5
- AP: No. 4
- Record: 29–8 (13–5 ACC)
- Head coach: Tony Bennett (7th season)
- Associate head coach: Ron Sanchez (7th season)
- Assistant coaches: Jason Williford (7th season); Brad Soderberg (1st season)
- Offensive scheme: Blocker-Mover
- Base defense: Pack line
- Home arena: John Paul Jones Arena

2015–16 ACC men's basketball standings
	Conf.				Overall
Team	W		L	PCT	W		L	PCT
No. 3 North Carolina †	14	–	4	.778	33	–	7	.825
No. 4 Virginia	13	–	5	.722	29	–	8	.784
No. 10 Miami (FL)	13	–	5	.722	27	–	8	.771
No. 16 Louisville*	12	–	6	.667	23	–	8	.742
Notre Dame	11	–	7	.611	24	–	12	.667
No. 19 Duke	11	–	7	.611	25	–	11	.694
Virginia Tech	10	–	8	.556	20	–	15	.571
Clemson	10	–	8	.556	17	–	14	.548
Pittsburgh	9	–	9	.500	21	–	12	.636
Syracuse	9	–	9	.500	23	–	14	.622
Georgia Tech	8	–	10	.444	21	–	15	.583
Florida State	8	–	10	.444	20	–	14	.588
NC State	5	–	13	.278	16	–	17	.485
Wake Forest	2	–	16	.111	11	–	20	.355
Boston College	0	–	18	.000	7	–	25	.219
† 2016 ACC tournament winner * Ineligible for both the 2016 ACC tournament and the 2016 NCAA tournament due to self-imposed postseason ban. Rankings from AP poll

The 2015–16 Virginia Cavaliers men's basketball team represented the University of Virginia during the 2015–16 NCAA Division I men's basketball season, in their 111th season of play. The team was led by head coach Tony Bennett, in his seventh year, and played their home games at John Paul Jones Arena in Charlottesville, Virginia as members of the Atlantic Coast Conference. They finished the season 29–8, 13–5 in ACC play to finish in a tie for second place. They defeated Georgia Tech and Miami (FL) to advance to the championship game of the ACC tournament, where they lost to North Carolina. They received an at-large bid to the NCAA tournament as a #1 seed, where they defeated Hampton, Butler, and Iowa State to advance to the Elite Eight, where they lost to fellow ACC member Syracuse.

== Last season ==
The Cavaliers finished the 2014–15 season with a record of 30–4 overall and 16–2 in conference play, finishing in first place in the ACC for the second straight season. Despite their best regular season record in school history of 28–2, and reaching their highest national ranking since 1983, they fell in the semifinals of the ACC tournament to North Carolina, and in the NCAA Tournament Round of 32 to Michigan State.

=== Departures ===
Name	Number	Pos.	Height	Weight	Year	Hometown	Reason for departure
Justin Anderson	1	G	6'6"	228	Junior	Montross, Virginia	2015 NBA draft/Dallas Mavericks
B. J. Stith	2	G	6'5"	205	Freshman	Lawrenceville, Virginia	Transferred to Old Dominion
Darion Atkins	5	F	6'8"	241	Senior	Clinton, Maryland	Graduated/2015 NBA draft
Maleek Frazier	22	G	5'10"	170	Senior	Charlottesville, Virginia	Graduated
Rob Vozenilek	23	G	6'2"	190	Senior	Richmond, Virginia	Graduated

=== Coaching changes ===
On April 1, 2015, associate head coach Ritchie McKay announced that he would be re-taking the head coaching job at Liberty, which he previously held from 2007 to 2009 until coming to Virginia. On April 17, Lindenwood head coach Brad Soderberg was hired. Soderberg had previously served as an assistant at Wisconsin alongside Tony Bennett's father Dick, and was interim head coach following the latter's retirement in 2000. On July 2, 2015, Ron Sanchez was promoted to associate head coach.

== Class of 2015 signees ==
College recruiting
Name	Hometown	School	Height	Weight	Commit date
Jarred Reuter; PF	Marion, MA	Brewster Academy	6 ft 8 in (2.03 m)	235 lb (107 kg)	August 2, 2014
Jarred Reuter; PF	Recruit ratings: Scout: Rivals: 247Sports: ESPN: (80)				
Mamadi Diakite; PF	Conakry, Guinea	Blue Ridge School	6 ft 10 in (2.08 m)	200 lb (91 kg)	August 4, 2015
Mamadi Diakite; PF	Recruit ratings: Scout: Rivals: 247Sports: ESPN: (85)				
Overall recruit ranking:
Note: In many cases, Scout, Rivals, 247Sports, On3, and ESPN may conflict in their listings of height and weight.; In these cases, the average was taken. ESPN grades are on a 100-point scale.; Sources: "Virginia 2015 Basketball Commitments". Rivals.; "2015 Virginia Commits". Scout.; "2015 Player Commits". ESPN.; "Scout.com Team Recruiting Rankings". Scout.; "2015 Team Ranking". Rivals.; "Virginia 2015 Basketball Commitments". 247Sports.

Diakite originally committed to the class of 2016, but at the time of his commitment stated that there was an "80-percent chance" that he could reclassify to 2015 and redshirt. On September 3, Bennett announced that Diakite was eligible to join the program.

=== Incoming transfers ===
Name	Number	Pos.	Height	Weight	Year	Hometown	Previous school
Austin Nichols	1	F	6'9"	228	Junior	Collierville, TN	Transferred from Memphis. Under NCAA transfer rules, Nichols had to redshirt for the 2015–16 season. After this season, he would have two years of remaining eligibility.

== Roster ==
2015–16 Virginia Cavaliers men's basketball team
Players
Coaches

Pos.	#	Name	Height	Weight	Year	Previous school	Hometown
G	0	Devon Hall	6 ft 5 in (1.96 m)	209 lb (95 kg)	RS So	Cape Henry Collegiate	Virginia Beach, Virginia
F	1	Austin Nichols (I) (redshirt)	6 ft 9 in (2.06 m)	232 lb (105 kg)	Jr	Briarcrest Christian/Memphis	Collierville, Tennessee
G	2	Justice Bartley (W)	6 ft 6 in (1.98 m)	209 lb (95 kg)	Fr	Montrose Christian School	Lilburn, Georgia
G	4	Marial Shayok	6 ft 5 in (1.96 m)	209 lb (95 kg)	So	Blair Academy	Ottawa, Ontario
F/C	10	Mike Tobey	7 ft 0 in (2.13 m)	260 lb (118 kg)	Sr	Blair Academy	Monroe, New York
F	11	Evan Nolte	6 ft 8 in (2.03 m)	228 lb (103 kg)	Sr	Milton HS	Milton, Georgia
F	13	Anthony Gill	6 ft 8 in (2.03 m)	230 lb (104 kg)	RS Sr	Charlotte Christian/South Carolina	High Point, North Carolina
G	15	Malcolm Brogdon	6 ft 5 in (1.96 m)	215 lb (98 kg)	RS Sr	Greater Atlanta Christian	Norcross, Georgia
F	21	Isaiah Wilkins	6 ft 7 in (2.01 m)	230 lb (104 kg)	So	Greater Atlanta Christian	Atlanta, Georgia
F	24	Caid Kirven (W)	6 ft 9 in (2.06 m)	228 lb (103 kg)	Sr	Woodberry Forest	Raleigh, North Carolina
F	25	Mamadi Diakite (redshirt)	6 ft 9 in (2.06 m)	195 lb (88 kg)	Fr	Blue Ridge School	Conakry, Guinea
F	31	Jarred Reuter	6 ft 7 in (2.01 m)	243 lb (110 kg)	Fr	Brewster Academy	Marion, Massachusetts
G	32	London Perrantes	6 ft 2 in (1.88 m)	192 lb (87 kg)	Jr	Crespi Carmelite HS	Los Angeles, California
C	33	Jack Salt	6 ft 11 in (2.11 m)	250 lb (113 kg)	RS Fr	Westlake Boys HS	Auckland, New Zealand
F	34	Jeff Jones (W)	6 ft 6 in (1.98 m)	213 lb (97 kg)	Jr	St. Anne's-Belfield	Charlottesville, Virginia
G	51	Darius Thompson	6 ft 4 in (1.93 m)	196 lb (89 kg)	RS So	Blackman HS/Tennessee	Murfreesboro, Tennessee

Head coach

- Tony Bennett (Green Bay)

Assistant coach(es)

- Ron Sanchez (SUNY-Oneonta)
- Brad Soderberg (UW–Stevens Point)
- Jason Williford (Virginia)

Strength and conditioning coach(es)

- Mike Curtis (Virginia)

Athletic trainer(s)

- Ethan Saliba (Kansas)

Legend

- (C) Team captain
- (S) Suspended
- (I) Ineligible
- (W) Walk-on
- Injured
- Current redshirt

Roster
Last update: September 24, 2015

=== Depth chart ===
Pos.	Starting 5	Bench 1	Bench 2
F/C	Anthony Gill	Mike Tobey	Jack Salt
F	Isaiah Wilkins	Jarred Reuter	Caid Kirven
G/F	Devon Hall	Evan Nolte	Jeff Jones
G	Malcolm Brogdon	Marial Shayok	Justice Bartley
PG	London Perrantes	Darius Thompson

== Schedule ==
Date time, TV	Rank^{#}	Opponent^{#}	Result	Record	High points	High rebounds	High assists	Site (attendance) city, state
Non-conference regular season
Nov 13, 2015*; 7:00 pm, ESPN3	No. 6	Morgan State	W 86–48	1–0	15 – Tobey	8 – Tobey	4 – Tied	John Paul Jones Arena (14,034); Charlottesville, Virginia
Nov 16, 2015*; 7:30 pm, ESPN2	No. 6	at George Washington; College Hoops Tip-Off Marathon	L 68–73	1–1	28 – Brogdon	8 – Brogdon	4 – Brogdon	Charles E. Smith Center (5,025); Washington, D.C.
Nov 19, 2015*; 9:30 pm, ESPN2	No. 6	vs. Bradley; Charleston Classic Quarterfinal	W 82–57	2–1	16 – Gill	7 – Gill	8 – Perrantes	TD Arena (3,437); Charleston, South Carolina
Nov 20, 2015*; 9:30 pm, ESPNU	No. 6	vs. Long Beach State; Charleston Classic Semifinal	W 87–52	3–1	17 – Shayok	6 – Reuter	7 – Brogdon	TD Arena (3,417); Charleston, South Carolina
Nov 22, 2015*; 9:30 pm, ESPN2	No. 6	vs. George Mason; Charleston Classic Championship	W 83–66	4–1	21 – Brogdon	8 – Tobey	11 – Perrantes	TD Arena (2,820); Charleston, South Carolina
Nov 25, 2015*; 7:00 pm, ESPN3	No. 12	Lehigh	W 80–54	5–1	23 – Brogdon	5 – Tied	8 – Perrantes	John Paul Jones Arena (14,220); Charlottesville, Virginia
Dec 1, 2015*; 7:30 pm, ESPN	No. 10	at Ohio State; ACC–Big Ten Challenge	W 64–58	6–1	22 – Brogdon	7 – Gill	6 – Thompson	Value City Arena (12,445); Columbus, Ohio
Dec 5, 2015*; 2:00 pm, RSN	No. 10	William & Mary	W 67–52	7–1	16 – Tied	7 – Gill	3 – Shayok	John Paul Jones Arena (14,105); Charlottesville, Virginia
Dec 8, 2015*; 7:00 pm, ESPN	No. 10	vs. No. 14 West Virginia; Jimmy V Classic	W 70–54	8–1	20 – Gill	12 – Gill	4 – Perrantes	Madison Square Garden; New York, New York
Dec 19, 2015*; Noon, ESPN2	No. 8	No. 12 Villanova	W 86–75	9–1	22 – Gill	7 – Tied	6 – Brogdon	John Paul Jones Arena (14,593); Charlottesville, Virginia
Dec 22, 2015*; 9:00 pm, ESPN2	No. 5	California	W 63–62 ^{OT}	10–1	17 – Gill	7 – Wilkins	6 – Perrantes	John Paul Jones Arena (13,265); Charlottesville, Virginia
Dec 30, 2015*; 6:00 pm, ESPNU	No. 5	Oakland	W 71–58	11–1	17 – Gill	8 – Wilkins	5 – Brogdon	John Paul Jones Arena (14,465); Charlottesville, Virginia
ACC regular season
Jan 2, 2016; 5:00 pm, ESPN2	No. 5	Notre Dame	W 77–66	12–1 (1–0)	24 – Brogdon	6 – Tied	5 – Perrantes	John Paul Jones Arena (14,389); Charlottesville, Virginia
Jan 4, 2016; 9:00 pm, ESPN2	No. 4	at Virginia Tech; Commonwealth Clash	L 68–70	12–2 (1–1)	22 – Perrantes	8 – Tied	4 – Brogdon	Cassell Coliseum (6,157); Blacksburg, Virginia
Jan 9, 2016; 2:00 pm, ACCN	No. 4	at Georgia Tech	L 64–68	12–3 (1–2)	19 – Brogdon	7 – Tobey	4 – Perrantes	Hank McCamish Pavilion (8,073); Atlanta, Georgia
Jan 12, 2016; 7:00 pm, ESPNU	No. 13	No. 8 Miami (FL)	W 66–58	13–3 (2–2)	20 – Brogdon	8 – Gill	3 – Tied	John Paul Jones Arena (13,495); Charlottesville, Virginia
Jan 17, 2016; 6:30 pm, ESPNU	No. 13	at Florida State	L 62–69	13–4 (2–3)	19 – Perrantes	5 – Brogdon	5 – Brogdon	Donald L. Tucker Center (9,158); Tallahassee, Florida
Jan 19, 2016; 9:00 pm, ACCN	No. 13	Clemson	W 69–62	14–4 (3–3)	20 – Brogdon	6 – Tied	4 – Tied	John Paul Jones Arena (14,398); Charlottesville, Virginia
Jan 24, 2016; 7:00 pm, ESPN2	No. 13	Syracuse	W 73–65	15–4 (4–3)	21 – Brogdon	8 – Gill	7 – Perrantes	John Paul Jones Arena (13,305); Charlottesville, Virginia
Jan 26, 2016; 7:00 pm, ESPN3	No. 11	at Wake Forest	W 72–71	16–4 (5–3)	28 – Brogdon	7 – Brogdon	5 – Perrantes	LJVM Coliseum (9,221); Winston-Salem, North Carolina
Jan 30, 2016; 1:00 pm, CBS	No. 11	at No. 16 Louisville	W 63–47	17–4 (6–3)	13 – Tied	6 – Gill	5 – Perrantes	KFC Yum! Center (21,714); Louisville, Kentucky
Feb 3, 2016; 7:00 pm, RSN	No. 9	Boston College	W 61–47	18–4 (7–3)	27 – Brogdon	11 – Gill	4 – Perrantes	John Paul Jones Arena (14,310); Charlottesville, Virginia
Feb 6, 2016; Noon, ACCN	No. 9	at Pittsburgh	W 64–50	19–4 (8–3)	21 – Brogdon	7 – Wilkins	5 – Wilkins	Petersen Events Center (12,508); Pittsburgh, Pennsylvania
Feb 9, 2016; 8:00 pm, ACCN	No. 7	Virginia Tech; Commonwealth Clash	W 67–49	20–4 (9–3)	16 – Gill	5 – Tied	5 – Hall	John Paul Jones Arena (14,395); Charlottesville, Virginia
Feb 13, 2016; 4:30 pm, ESPN	No. 7	at Duke	L 62–63	20–5 (9–4)	18 – Brogdon	5 – Tied	4 – Shayok	Cameron Indoor Stadium (9,314); Durham, North Carolina
Feb 15, 2016; 7:00 pm, ESPN	No. 7	NC State	W 73–53	21–5 (10–4)	22 – Brogdon	13 – Wilkins	5 – Tied	John Paul Jones Arena (14,016); Charlottesville, Virginia
Feb 22, 2016; 7:00 pm, ESPN	No. 3	at No. 12 Miami (FL)	L 61–64	21–6 (10–5)	28 – Brogdon	10 – Gill	7 – Perrantes	BankUnited Center (7,016); Coral Gables, Florida
Feb 27, 2016; 6:30 pm, ESPN	No. 3	No. 7 North Carolina; ESPN College GameDay	W 79–74	22–6 (11–5)	26 – Brogdon	9 – Gill	6 – Perrantes	John Paul Jones Arena (14,593); Charlottesville, Virginia
Mar 1, 2016; 7:00 pm, ESPNU	No. 4	at Clemson	W 64–57	23–6 (12–5)	18 – Brogdon	10 – Gill	4 – Perrantes	Bon Secours Wellness Arena (9,626); Greenville, South Carolina^{1}
Mar 5, 2016; 8:30 pm, ESPN	No. 4	No. 11 Louisville	W 68–46	24–6 (13–5)	17 – Brogdon	20 – Tobey	4 – Perrantes	John Paul Jones Arena (14,088); Charlottesville, Virginia
ACC Tournament
Mar 10, 2016; 7:00 pm, ESPN/ACCN	(2) No. 4	vs. (10) Georgia Tech; Quarterfinals	W 72–52	25–6	26 – Brogdon	8 – Gill	8 – Perrantes	Verizon Center (20,719); Washington, D.C.
Mar 11, 2016; 9:00 pm, ESPN/ACCN	(2) No. 4	vs. (3) No. 11 Miami (FL); Semifinals	W 73–68	26–6	24 – Brogdon	7 – Wilkins	4 – Brogdon	Verizon Center (20,719); Washington, D.C.
Mar 12, 2016; 9:00 pm, ESPN/ACCN	(2) No. 4	vs. (1) No. 7 North Carolina; Championship	L 57–61	26–7	15 – Brogdon	9 – Tobey	4 – Brogdon	Verizon Center (20,719); Washington, D.C.
NCAA tournament
Mar 17, 2016*; 3:10 pm, truTV	(1 MW) No. 4	vs. (16 MW) Hampton; First Round	W 81–45	27–7	19 – Gill	7 – Gill	4 – 3 Tied	PNC Arena (19,722); Raleigh, NC
Mar 19, 2016*; 7:10 pm, TBS	(1 MW) No. 4	vs. (9 MW) Butler; Second Round	W 77–69	28–7	22 – Brogdon	8 – Gill	5 – Brogdon	PNC Arena (19,433); Raleigh, NC
Mar 25, 2016*; 7:10 pm, CBS	(1 MW) No. 4	vs. (4 MW) No. 22 Iowa State; Sweet Sixteen	W 84–71	29–7	23 – Gill	8 – Gill	9 – Perrantes	United Center (21,490); Chicago, Illinois
Mar 27, 2016*; 6:09 pm, TBS	(1 MW) No. 4	vs. (10 MW) Syracuse; Elite Eight	L 62–68	29–8	18 – Perrantes	6 – Brogdon	7 – Brogdon	United Center (20,155); Chicago, Illinois
*Non-conference game. ^{#}Rankings from AP Poll. (#) Tournament seedings in parentheses. MW=Midwest Region^1Game played in Greenville, South Carolina, during renovations to Littlejohn Coliseum.. All times are in Eastern Time.

== Rankings ==
Ranking movements Legend: ██ Increase in ranking ██ Decrease in ranking ( ) = First-place votes
	Week																			
Poll	Pre	2	3	4	5	6	7	8	9	10	11	12	13	14	15	16	17	18	19	Final
AP	6	6	12	10	10	8	5	5	4	13	13	11	9	7 (1)	7	3	4	4	4	N/A
Coaches	6	6	12	10	10	9	5	5	4	11	13	12	9	7	8	3	4	4	5	5

== Team players drafted into the NBA ==
Year	Round	Pick	Player	NBA club
2016	2	36	Malcolm Brogdon	Milwaukee Bucks

== Awards and honors ==
- Tony Bennett
  - USBWA District III Coach of the Year
- Malcolm Brogdon
  - ACC Preseason Co-Player of the Year
  - ACC Player of the Year (ACSMA, ACC Coaches)
  - ACC Defensive Player of the Year (ACSMA, ACC Coaches)
  - All-ACC First Team
  - USBWA District III All-District Team
  - USBWA District III Player of the Year
  - Consensus First-Team All-American
  - NABC Defensive Player of the Year
  - Senior CLASS First-Team
- Anthony Gill
  - All-ACC Third Team (ACSMA, ACC Coaches)
  - NABC Allstate Good Works Team
  - USBWA District III All-District Team
- London Perrantes
  - All-ACC Honorable Mention (ACSMA, ACC Coaches)
