= 2024–25 Virginia Cavaliers men's basketball team =

American men's college basketball season

2024–25 Virginia Cavaliers men's basketball
- Conference: Atlantic Coast Conference
- Record: 15–17 (8–12 ACC)
- Head coach: Ron Sanchez (1st season)
- Associate head coach: Jason Williford (16th season)
- Assistant coaches: Orlando Vandross (7th season); Isaiah Wilkins (4th season); Brad Soderberg (11th season)
- Home arena: John Paul Jones Arena

2024–25 ACC men's basketball standings
	Conf.				Overall
Team	W		L	PCT	W		L	PCT
No. 3 Duke †	19	–	1	.950	35	–	4	.897
No. 21 Louisville	18	–	2	.900	27	–	8	.771
No. 22 Clemson	18	–	2	.900	27	–	7	.794
Wake Forest	13	–	7	.650	21	–	11	.656
North Carolina	13	–	7	.650	23	–	14	.622
SMU	13	–	7	.650	24	–	11	.686
Stanford	11	–	9	.550	21	–	14	.600
Georgia Tech	10	–	10	.500	17	–	17	.500
Virginia	8	–	12	.400	15	–	17	.469
Virginia Tech	8	–	12	.400	13	–	19	.406
Florida State	8	–	12	.400	17	–	15	.531
Notre Dame	8	–	12	.400	15	–	18	.455
Pittsburgh	8	–	12	.400	17	–	15	.531
Syracuse	7	–	13	.350	14	–	19	.424
California	6	–	14	.300	14	–	19	.424
NC State	5	–	15	.250	12	–	19	.387
Boston College	4	–	16	.200	12	–	19	.387
Miami (FL)	3	–	17	.150	7	–	24	.226
† 2025 ACC tournament winner Rankings from AP poll

The 2024–25 Virginia Cavaliers men's basketball team represented the University of Virginia during the 2024–25 NCAA Division I men's basketball season. They were led by interim head coach Ron Sanchez after former head coach Tony Bennett announced his retirement before the start of the season on October 17, 2024. They played their home games at John Paul Jones Arena in Charlottesville, Virginia, as members of the Atlantic Coast Conference.

Despite the last-minute coaching change, the Cavailers started the season 3–0, including a ten-point victory over Villanova in the Hall of Fame Series. They then traveled to the Bahamas to participate in the Baha Mar Hoops Championship where their fortunes changed. They lost in the semifinals to eleventh-ranked Tennessee 64–42 and in the third place game against twenty second-ranked St. John's 80–55. They won two games against non-Power 4 opponents before losing their ACC–SEC Challenge game against thirteenth-ranked Florida 87–69. They followed that with a loss in their ACC opener against SMU. They finished their non-conference slate 2–1, with a loss against twenty first-ranked Memphis. They closed the 2024 portion of their schedule with an ACC win over NC State.

The Cavailers had a rough start to the 2025 portion of the schedule, as they went on a five-game losing streak. The streak included two losses to Louisville, and losses in California to Stanford and California, and a loss in a rematch with SMU. They broke the streak by going 2–2 in their next four games. This streak included a loss in their rivalry game against Virginia Tech. The team went 4–2 over their next six games, which included a three game winning streak. They defeated Pittsburgh, Georgia Tech, Wake Forest, and won the rivaly rematch with Virginia Tech. However, they lost to third-ranked Duke and at North Carolina. They lost to thirteenth-ranked Clemson and defeated Florida State by three points in their next two games. The Cavaliers lost the regular season finale to Syracuse 84–70.

The Cavaliers finished the season 15–16 and 8–12 in ACC play to finish in a five-way tie for ninth place. The team finished atop the five-way tiebreaker and were the ninth seed in the 2025 ACC tournament. They faced eighth-seed Georgia Tech in the First Round. Despite defeating the Yellow Jackets during the regular season, they were defeated 66–60 in the tournament. They were not invited to the NCAA tournament or the NIT. Interim coach Ron Sanchez was not retained at the end of the season.

The Virginia Cavaliers drew an average home attendance of 13,478, the highest of all basketball teams from Virginia.

== Previous season ==
The 2023–24 Cavaliers finished the season 23–11 and 13–7 in ACC play to finish in third place. As the third seed in the ACC tournament, they earned a bye to the quarterfinals, where they defeated third seed Boston College in overtime before losing to eventual champion NC State in overtime in the semifinals. They earned a controversial at-large bid to the NCAA tournament and were placed as a tenth seed in the First Four in the Midwest region. They lost their matchup with Colorado State 67–42 to end their season.

== Offseason ==
=== Tony Bennett Retirement ===
On October 18, 2024, longtime head coach Tony Bennett announced his surprise retirement. He posted a 364–136 record at UVA, guiding the Cavaliers to the 2019 NCAA Championship, two ACC Tournament titles, six ACC regular-season championships and 10 NCAA tournament appearances. Bennett was named ACC Coach of the Year in 2014, 2015, 2018 and 2019.

Former Charlotte head coach and longtime assistant Ron Sanchez was named the interim head coach following Bennett's announcement. Isaiah Wilkins was promoted to full-time assistant.

=== Coaching departures ===
Virginia coaching departures
Name	Position	Years on staff	New position
Tony Bennett	Head coach	15	Retired
Larry Mangino	Director of player development	8	Assistant coach at Liberty
Johnny Carpenter	Director of player personnel	10	Undisclosed job with the Memphis Grizzlies

=== Coaching promotions ===
Virginia coaching promotions
Name	Previous position	New position
Brad Soderberg	Director of scouting	Assistant coach
Isaiah Wilkins	Graduate assistant	Assistant coach

=== Departures ===
Virginia departures
Name	Number	Pos.	Height	Weight	Year	Hometown	Reason for departure
Dante Harris	1	G	6'0"	170	Senior	Washington, D.C.	Transferred to Memphis (Note: Harris was demoted to a walk-on and was removed from the roster in September. In December, he committed to Memphis.)
Reece Beekman	2	G	6'3"	194	Senior	Milwaukee, Wisconsin	Graduated
Ryan Dunn	13	G	6'8"	216	Sophomore	Freeport, New York	Drafted 28th overall in the 2024 NBA draft
Jordan Minor	22	F	6'8"	242	Graduate student	Kingston, Massachusetts	Graduated
Tristan How	24	F	6'7"	210	Senior	Virginia Beach, Virginia	Graduated
Jake Groves	34	F	6'9"	211	Graduate student	Spokane, Washington	Graduated
Leon Bond III	35	G/F	6'5"	200	(redshirt) Freshman	Wauwatosa, Wisconsin	Transferred to Northern Iowa
Jalen Warley	–	G	6'7"	205	Senior	Philadelphia, Pennsylvania	Transferred to Gonzaga (Note: Warley entered the transfer portal after Bennett retired, and committed to Gonzaga in November.)

=== Incoming transfers ===
Virginia incoming transfers
Name	Number	Pos.	Height	Weight	Year	Hometown	Previous school
Elijah Saunders	2	F	6'8"	225	Junior	Phoenix, Arizona	San Diego State
Dai Dai Ames	7	G	6'1"	185	Sophomore	Chicago, Illinois	Kansas State
TJ Power	23	F	6'9"	221	Sophomore	Shrewsbury, Massachusetts	Duke
Carter Lang	35	F	6'9"	235	Sophomore	Charlottesville, Virginia	Vanderbilt

=== 2024 recruiting class ===
College recruiting
Name	Hometown	School	Height	Weight	Commit date
Christian Bliss #48 SG	Newtown, PA	George School	6 ft 4 in (1.93 m)	185 lb (84 kg)	Jun 30, 2023
Christian Bliss #48 SG	Recruit ratings: Rivals: 247Sports: ESPN: (82)				
Ishan Sharma; SG	Milton, ON	Fort Erie International Academy	6 ft 5 in (1.96 m)	180 lb (82 kg)	Oct 19, 2023
Ishan Sharma; SG	Recruit ratings: Rivals: 247Sports: ESPN: (77)				
Overall recruit ranking: Rivals: 16 247Sports: 12 ESPN: –
Note: In many cases, Scout, Rivals, 247Sports, On3, and ESPN may conflict in their listings of height and weight.; In these cases, the average was taken. ESPN grades are on a 100-point scale.; Sources: "Virginia 2024 Basketball Commitments". Rivals.; "2024 Virginia Commits". Scout.; "2024 Player Commits". ESPN.; "Scout.com Team Recruiting Rankings". Scout.; "2024 Team Ranking". Rivals.; "Virginia 2024 Basketball Commitments". 247Sports.

== Roster ==
=== Players ===
2024–25 Virginia Cavaliers men's basketball team
Players
Coaches

Pos.	#	Name	Height	Weight	Year	Previous school	Hometown
F	0	Blake Buchanan	6 ft 11 in (2.11 m)	225 lb (102 kg)	So	Lake City	Coeur d'Alene, ID
F	2	Elijah Saunders	6 ft 8 in (2.03 m)	229 lb (104 kg)	Jr	Sunnyslope; San Diego State	Phoenix, AZ
G	4	Andrew Rohde	6 ft 6 in (1.98 m)	202 lb (92 kg)	Jr	Brookfield Central; St. Thomas (MN)	Milwaukee, WI
F	5	Jacob Cofie	6 ft 10 in (2.08 m)	230 lb (104 kg)	Fr	Eastside Catholic School	Seattle, WA
G	7	Dai Dai Ames	6 ft 1 in (1.85 m)	185 lb (84 kg)	So	Kenwood Academy; Kansas State	Chicago, IL
G	8	Bryce Walker (W)	6 ft 2 in (1.88 m)	200 lb (91 kg)	Sr	New Hampton School	Beltsville, MD
G	9	Ishan Sharma	6 ft 5 in (1.96 m)	185 lb (84 kg)	Fr	Fort Erie International	Milton, ON
G	10	Taine Murray	6 ft 5 in (1.96 m)	207 lb (94 kg)	Sr	Rosmini College	Auckland, New Zealand
G	11	Isaac McKneely	6 ft 4 in (1.93 m)	188 lb (85 kg)	Jr	Poca	Poca, WV
G	12	Elijah Gertrude	6 ft 4 in (1.93 m)	185 lb (84 kg)	So	Hudson Catholic Regional	Jersey City, NJ
G	13	Desmond Roberts (W)	6 ft 4 in (1.93 m)	206 lb (93 kg)	RS Fr	St. Anne's-Belfield	Charlottesville, VA
F/C	21	Anthony Robinson	6 ft 10 in (2.08 m)	238 lb (108 kg)	RS Fr	Christ School (NC)	Peachtree City, GA
F	23	TJ Power	6 ft 9 in (2.06 m)	216 lb (98 kg)	So	Worcester Academy; Duke	Shrewsbury, MA
G	30	Christian Bliss	6 ft 4 in (1.93 m)	198 lb (90 kg)	RS Fr	George School (PA)	Queens, NY
F	35	Carter Lang (W)	6 ft 9 in (2.06 m)	235 lb (107 kg)	So	St. Anne's-Belfield; Vanderbilt	Charlottesville, VA

Head coach

- Ron Sanchez (SUNY Oneonta)

Assistant coach(es)

- Jason Williford (Virginia)
- Orlando Vandross (American International)
- Isaiah Wilkins (Virginia)
- Brad Soderberg (UW-Stevens Point)

Legend

- (C) Team captain
- (S) Suspended
- (I) Ineligible
- (W) Walk-on
- Injured
- Current redshirt

Roster
Last update: February 16, 2025

=== Coaches ===
Virginia coaching staff
Name	Position	Year with position	Year on coaching staff	Alma mater	Hometown
Ron Sanchez	Dean and Markel Families interim head coach	1	11	SUNY-Oneonta	San Pedro de Macorís, DR
Jason Williford	Associate head coach	7	16	Virginia	Richmond, VA
Orlando Vandross	Assistant coach	7	10	American International	United States
Isaiah Wilkins	Assistant coach	1	4	Virginia	Lilburn, GA
Brad Soderberg	Assistant coach	1	10	UW-Stevens Point	Wausau, WI
Chase Coleman	Graduate assistant	2	2	Virginia	Norfolk, Virginia
Kyle Guy	Athlete development mentor and special assistant	1	1	Virginia	Indianapolis, IN
Mike Curtis	Strength and conditioning coach	16	16	Virginia	Richmond, VA
Ethan Saliba	Head athletic trainer	27	42	Kansas	United States
Ronnie Wideman	Associate AD for basketball administration/operations	15	16	Washington State	Washougal, WA

== Schedule and results ==
Date time, TV	Rank^{#}	Opponent^{#}	Result	Record	High points	High rebounds	High assists	Site (attendance) city, state
Scrimmage
October 19, 2024*		at VCU; Scrimmage	L 49–71		–	–	–	Siegel Center (0); Richmond, VA
Regular season
November 6, 2024*; 7:00 p.m., ACCNX/ESPN+		Campbell	W 65–56	1–0	16 – Cofie	7 – Buchanan	5 – Tied	John Paul Jones Arena (13,414); Charlottesville, VA
November 11, 2024*; 7:00 p.m., ACCNX/ESPN+		Coppin State	W 62–45	2–0	15 – Saunders	11 – Cofie	3 – Tied	John Paul Jones Arena (13,294); Charlottesville, VA
November 15, 2024*; 5:00 p.m., TNT/TruTV		vs. Villanova; Hall of Fame Series	W 70–60	3–0	23 – McKneely	6 – Tied	4 – Rohde	CFG Bank Arena (4,868); Baltimore, MD
November 21, 2024*; 9:30 p.m., CBSSN		vs. No. 11 Tennessee; Baha Mar Hoops Championship semifinals	L 42–64	3–1	12 – Ames	7 – Buchanan	3 – Tied	Baha Mar Convention Center (2,077); Nassau, Bahamas
November 22, 2024*; 7:00 p.m., CBSSN		vs. No. 22 St. John's; Baha Mar Hoops Championship 3rd place game	L 55–80	3–2	12 – Saunders	7 – Cofie	3 – Tied	Baha Mar Convention Center (2,119); Nassau, Bahamas
November 26, 2024*; 7:00 p.m., ACCN		Manhattan	W 74–65	4–2	18 – McKneely	6 – Saunders	5 – Ames	John Paul Jones Arena (12,347); Charlottesville, VA
November 29, 2024*; 4:00 p.m., ACCNX/ESPN+		Holy Cross	W 67–41	5–2	16 – Ames	6 – Tied	4 – Tied	John Paul Jones Arena (13,488); Charlottesville, VA
December 4, 2024*; 7:15 p.m., ESPN2		at No. 13 Florida; ACC–SEC Challenge	L 69–87	5–3	19 – Saunders	7 – McKneely	5 – McKneely	O'Connell Center (9,184); Gainesville, FL
December 7, 2024; 2:15 p.m., The CW		at SMU	L 51–63	5–4 (0–1)	17 – McKneely	4 – Tied	3 – Tied	Moody Coliseum (5,189); University Park, TX
December 12, 2024*; 7:00 p.m., ACCN		Bethune–Cookman	W 59–41	6–4	15 – Saunders	10 – Cofie	4 – McKneely	John Paul Jones Arena (12,021); Charlottesville, VA
December 18, 2024*; 7:00 p.m., ESPN2		No. 21 Memphis	L 62–64	6–5	15 – Saunders	6 – Robinson	5 – McKneely	John Paul Jones Arena (12,108); Charlottesville, VA
December 22, 2024*; 2:00 p.m., ACCN		American	W 63–58	7–5	21 – Saunders	8 – Saunders	4 – Tied	John Paul Jones Arena (12,384); Charlottesville, VA
December 31, 2024; 12:00 p.m., ESPN2		NC State	W 70–67	8–5 (1–1)	22 – Saunders	5 – Saunders	7 – Rohde	John Paul Jones Arena (13,875); Charlottesville, Va
January 4, 2025; 4:00 p.m., ACCN		Louisville	L 50–70	8–6 (1–2)	16 – Rohde	5 – Murray	4 – McKneely	John Paul Jones Arena (13,316); Charlottesville, Va
January 8, 2025; 11:00 p.m., ESPN2		at California	L 61–75	8–7 (1–3)	14 – Rohde	10 – Saunders	6 – Rohde	Haas Pavilion (3,696); Berkeley, CA
January 11, 2025; 4:00 p.m., ESPNU		at Stanford	L 65–88	8–8 (1–4)	22 – McKneely	5 – Tied	5 – Rohde	Maples Pavilion (4,504); Stanford, CA
January 15, 2025; 9:00 p.m., ACCN		SMU	L 52–54	8–9 (1–5)	11 – Buchanan	15 – Buchanan	4 – Tied	John Paul Jones Arena (13,554); Charlottesville, VA
January 18, 2025; 12:00 p.m., ESPN2		at Louisville	L 67–81	8–10 (1–6)	19 – Saunders	10 – Saunders	4 – Tied	KFC Yum! Center (18,233); Louisville, KY
January 21, 2025; 7:00 p.m., ACCN		Boston College	W 74–56	9–10 (2–6)	21 – McKneely	6 – Tied	6 – Rohde	John Paul Jones Arena (13,481); Charlottesville, VA
January 25, 2025; 6:30 p.m., ESPN2		Notre Dame	L 59–74	9–11 (2–7)	17 – Cofie	6 – Tied	4 – Ames	John Paul Jones Arena (14,637); Charlottesville, VA
January 29, 2025; 7:00 p.m., ESPNU		at Miami	W 82–71	10–11 (3–7)	26 – McKneely	9 – Buchanan	7 – Murray	Watsco Center (5,509); Coral Gables, FL
February 1, 2025; 4:00 p.m., ACCN		Virginia Tech; Rivalry	L 74–75	10–12 (3–8)	19 – McKneely	6 – Tied	7 – Tied	John Paul Jones Arena (14,637); Charlottesville, VA
February 3, 2025; 7:00 p.m., ESPN		at Pittsburgh	W 73–57	11–12 (4–8)	27 – Ames	11 – Buchanan	9 – Rohde	Petersen Events Center (9,075); Pittsburgh, PA
February 8, 2025; 5:30 p.m., The CW		Georgia Tech	W 75–61	12–12 (5–8)	20 – McKneely	11 – Buchanan	9 – Rohde	John Paul Jones Arena (14,637); Charlottesville, VA
February 15, 2025; 2:00 p.m., The CW		at Virginia Tech; Rivalry	W 73–70	13–12 (6–8)	22 – McKneely	7 – Tied	9 – Rohde	Cassell Coliseum (8,925); Blacksburg, VA
February 17, 2025; 8:00 p.m., ESPN		No. 3 Duke	L 62–80	13–13 (6–9)	15 – Tied	5 – Rhode	5 – Rhode	John Paul Jones Arena (14,445); Charlottesville, VA
February 22, 2025; 4:00 p.m., ESPN2		at North Carolina	L 66–81	13–14 (6–10)	17 – McKneely	6 – Buchanan	4 – Tied	Dean Smith Center (21,750); Chapel Hill, NC
February 26, 2025; 9:00 p.m., ESPNU		at Wake Forest	W 83–75	14–14 (7–10)	27 – McKneely	6 – Saunders	5 – McKneely	LJVM Coliseum (7,851); Winston-Salem, NC
March 1, 2025; 12:00 p.m., ESPN2		No. 13 Clemson	L 58–71	14–15 (7–11)	16 – McKneely	6 – Saunders	5 – Rohde	John Paul Jones Arena (13,992); Charlottesville, VA
March 4, 2025; 9:00 p.m., ACCN		Florida State	W 60–57	15–15 (8–11)	18 – Ames	8 – Buchanan	4 – Buchanan	John Paul Jones Arena (13,503); Charlottesville, VA
March 8, 2025; 8:00 p.m., ACCN		at Syracuse	L 70–84	15–16 (8–12)	13 – Cofie	6 – Robinson	4 – Rohde	JMA Wireless Dome (20,274); Syracuse, NY
ACC tournament
March 12, 2025; 12:00 p.m., ESPN	(9)	vs. (8) Georgia Tech; Second round	L 60–66	15–17	27 – McKneely	5 – Tied	3 – Rohde	Spectrum Center (9,722); Charlotte, NC
*Non-conference game. ^{#}Rankings from AP Poll. (#) Tournament seedings in parentheses. All times are in Eastern Time.

== Rankings ==
Ranking movements Legend: ██ Increase in ranking ██ Decrease in ranking — = Not ranked RV = Received votes
	Week																				
Poll	Pre	1	2	3	4	5	6	7	8	9	10	11	12	13	14	15	16	17	18	19	Final
AP	—	—	—	—	—	—	—	—	—	—	—	—	—	—	—	—	—	—	—	—	—
Coaches	RV	—	—	—	—	—	—	—	—	—	—	—	—	—	—	—	—	—	—	—	—
