= 2014–15 Virginia Cavaliers men's basketball team =

American college basketball season

2014–15 Virginia Cavaliers men's basketball

ACC regular season champions Barclays Center Classic champions

NCAA tournament, round of 32
- Conference: Atlantic Coast Conference

Ranking
- Coaches: No. 8
- AP: No. 6
- Record: 30–4 (16–2 ACC)
- Head coach: Tony Bennett (6th season)
- Associate head coach: Ritchie McKay (6th season)
- Assistant coaches: Ron Sanchez (6th season); Jason Williford (6th season)
- Offensive scheme: Blocker-Mover
- Base defense: Pack-line
- Captains: Malcolm Brogdon; Anthony Gill; Darion Atkins
- Home arena: John Paul Jones Arena

2014–15 ACC men's basketball standings
	Conf.				Overall
Team	W		L	PCT	W		L	PCT
No. 6 Virginia	16	–	2	.889	30	–	4	.882
No. 4 Duke	15	–	3	.833	35	–	4	.897
No. 8 Notre Dame †	14	–	4	.778	32	–	6	.842
No. 15 North Carolina	11	–	7	.611	26	–	12	.684
Miami (FL)	10	–	8	.556	25	–	13	.658
NC State	10	–	8	.556	22	–	14	.611
Syracuse	9	–	9	.500	18	–	13	.581
Clemson	8	–	10	.444	16	–	15	.516
Florida State	8	–	10	.444	17	–	16	.515
Pittsburgh	8	–	10	.444	19	–	15	.559
Wake Forest	5	–	13	.278	13	–	19	.406
Boston College	4	–	14	.222	13	–	19	.406
Georgia Tech	3	–	15	.167	12	–	19	.387
Virginia Tech	2	–	16	.111	11	–	22	.333
No. 17 Louisville*	0	–	6	.000	0	–	8	.000
† ACC tournament winner Rankings from AP poll *Louisville: 24 reg. season games, 4 postseason games vacated due to sanctions against the program; Disputed Record-(27-9)(12-6)

The 2014–15 Virginia Cavaliers men's basketball team represented the University of Virginia during the 2014–15 NCAA Division I men's basketball season, in their 110th season of play. The team was led by head coach Tony Bennett, in his sixth year, and played their home games at John Paul Jones Arena as members of the Atlantic Coast Conference.

Building on the success of the previous season, the Cavaliers had their best regular season in program history with a record of 28–2, their first undefeated non-conference regular season record since 2000–01, and their highest national ranking since 1982–83, ranking at number two on the AP Poll for a total of seven weeks. The Cavaliers also became the first team outside of Tobacco Road to win back-to-back ACC regular season championships, with their conference record of 16–2. Particular highlights included holding Rutgers, Harvard, and Georgia Tech to under thirty points each. Virginia also held Harvard to a single field goal in the first half of their game, tying the NCAA record for fewest field goals allowed in the first half of a game since the shot clock was instituted in 1986. However, late-season injuries, in particular Justin Anderson's nearly five-week-long absence due to a broken finger and appendectomy, hurt the team, with the Cavaliers falling in a close loss to North Carolina in the ACC tournament semifinals. In the NCAA tournament they defeated Belmont in the second round before losing in the third round to Michigan State.

== Last season ==
The Cavaliers finished the season 30–4 overall and 16–2 in conference play, finishing in first place in the ACC outright for the first time since the 1980–81 season. They proceeded to win the ACC tournament for their second-ever conference championship. The team also tied for the most wins in a season in school history, set a school record for the most single-season conference wins, and earned their highest final national ranking since 1982. The Cavaliers received a #1 seed in the NCAA tournament, where they defeated Coastal Carolina and Memphis before losing to Michigan State in the Sweet Sixteen.

=== Departures ===
Name	Number	Pos.	Height	Weight	Year	Hometown	Reason for departure
Teven Jones	5	G	6'0"	182	Sophomore	Kannapolis, NC	Transferred to Tarleton State
Joe Harris	12	G	6'6"	225	Senior	Chelan, WA	Graduated/Cleveland Cavaliers
Akil Mitchell	25	F	6'8"	225	Senior	Charlotte, NC	Graduated/Houston Rockets/Rio Grande Valley Vipers
Thomas Rogers	30	G	6'6"	206	Senior	Farmville, VA	Graduated

=== Incoming transfers ===
Name	Number	Pos.	Height	Weight	Year	Hometown	Previous School
Darius Thompson	51	G	6'5"	181	Sophomore	Murfreesboro, TN	Transferred from Tennessee. Under NCAA transfer rules, Thompson had to redshirt for the 2014–15 season. After this season, he would have three years of remaining eligibility.

== Class of 2014 signees ==
College recruiting
Name	Hometown	School	Height	Weight	Commit date
Jack Salt; C	Auckland, New Zealand	Westlake High School	6 ft 10 in (2.08 m)	230 lb (100 kg)	09/18/2013
Jack Salt; C	Recruit ratings: Scout: Rivals: 247Sports: ESPN:				
Marial Shayok; SG	Ottawa, Ontario	Blair Academy	6 ft 6 in (1.98 m)	205 lb (93 kg)	04/22/2014
Marial Shayok; SG	Recruit ratings: Scout: Rivals: 247Sports: ESPN:				
B. J. Stith; SG	Brunswick, Virginia	Oak Hill Academy	6 ft 5 in (1.96 m)	200 lb (91 kg)	09/03/2011
B. J. Stith; SG	Recruit ratings: Scout: Rivals: 247Sports: ESPN:				
Isaiah Wilkins; SF	Norcross, Georgia	Greater Atlanta Christian School	6 ft 8 in (2.03 m)	210 lb (95 kg)	09/01/2013
Isaiah Wilkins; SF	Recruit ratings: Scout: Rivals: 247Sports: ESPN:				
Overall recruit ranking:
Note: In many cases, Scout, Rivals, 247Sports, On3, and ESPN may conflict in their listings of height and weight.; In these cases, the average was taken. ESPN grades are on a 100-point scale.; Sources: "Virginia Basketball Commitment List". Rivals.; "2014 Team Ranking". Rivals.

== Roster ==
On November 7, 2014, head coach Tony Bennett announced, via a Virginia athletic department press release, that London Perrantes and Evan Nolte would be suspended for two scrimmages and the first game of the season due to a violation of team rules. Following the first game of the season against James Madison, Bennett stated that Jack Salt was "leaning" towards a redshirt, but he had not made a final decision yet.

On February 7, 2015, Justin Anderson suffered a broken finger on his left hand during the Louisville game. He had surgery the next day, and was expected to return to playing after four to six weeks, but an emergency appendectomy on March 5 kept him sidelined. Anderson returned to play seven days later, against Florida State in the ACC Tournament quarterfinals.

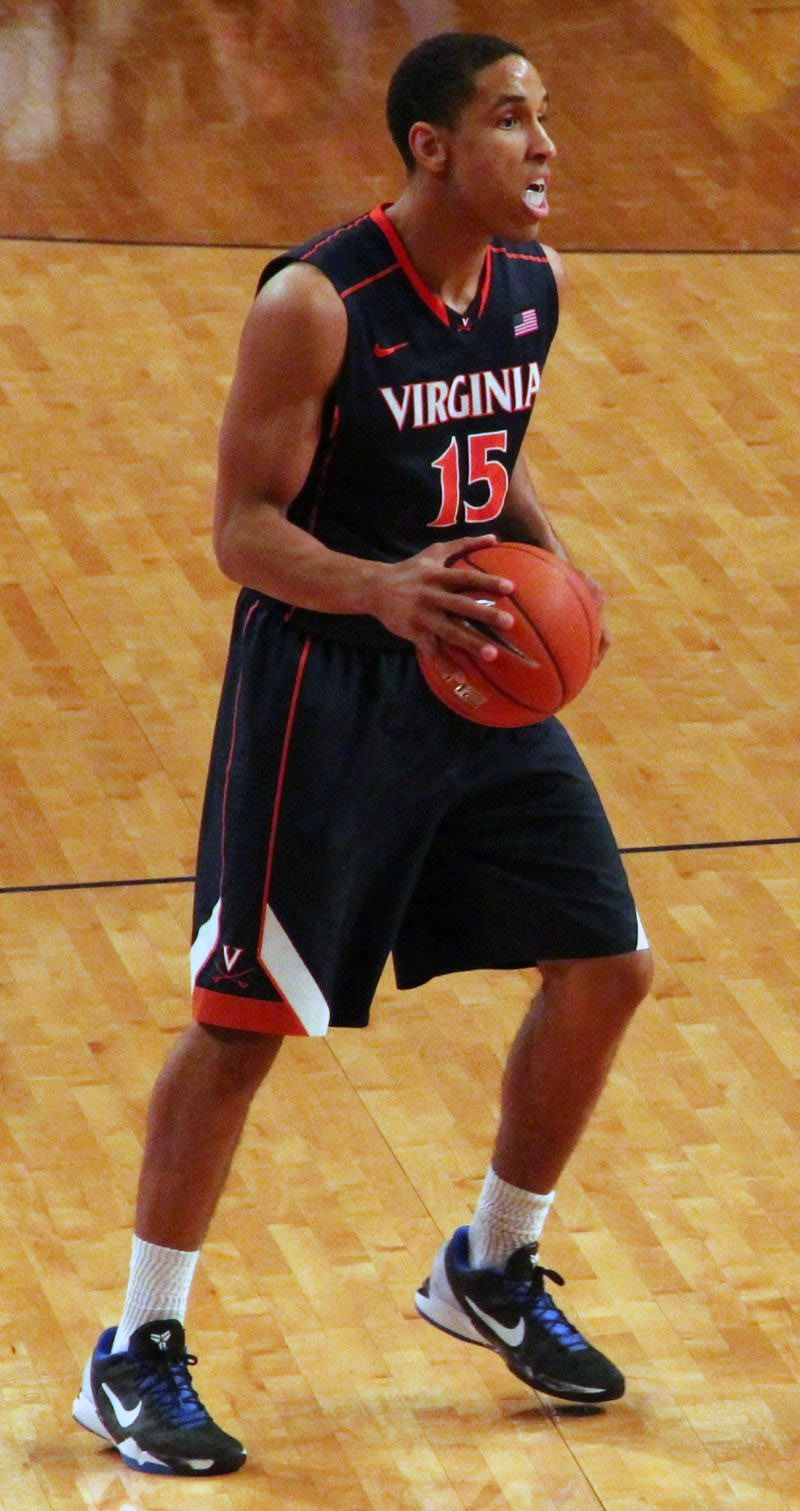
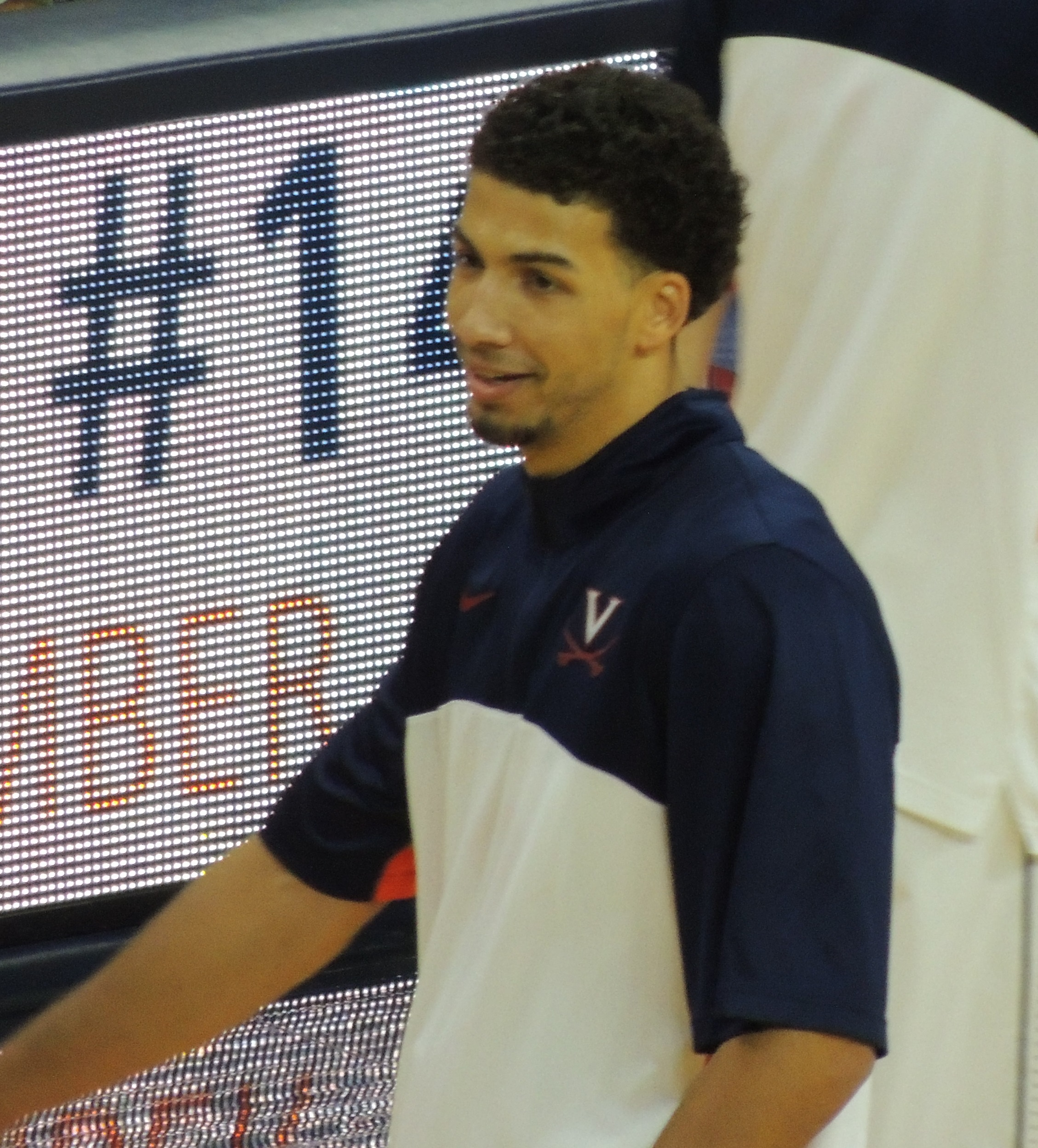
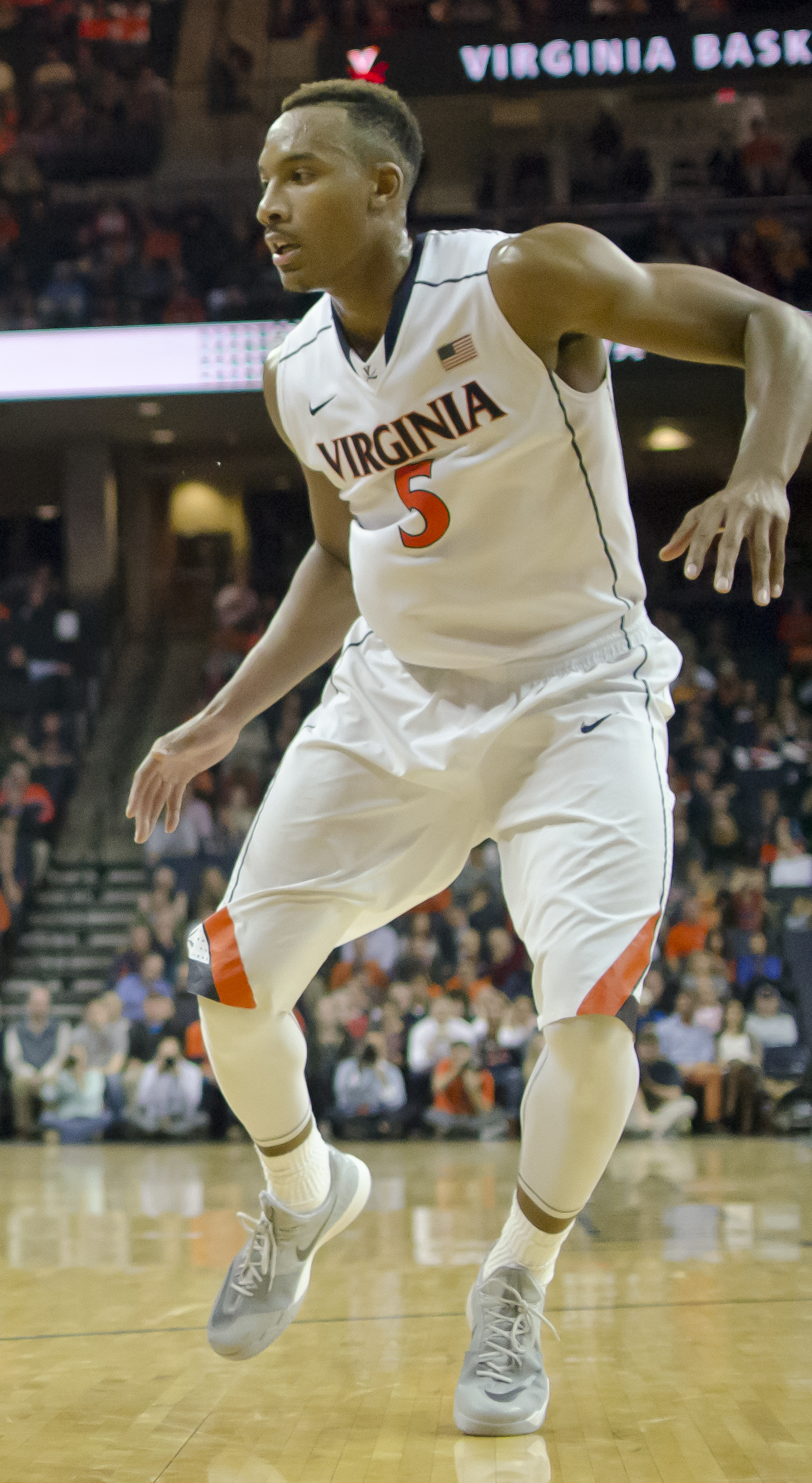
Redshirt juniors Malcolm Brogdon (top) and Anthony Gill (middle) served as tri-captains with senior Darion Atkins (bottom) for the 2014–15 campaign.

2014–15 Virginia Cavaliers men's basketball team
Players
Coaches

Pos.	#	Name	Height	Weight	Year	Previous school	Hometown
G	0	Devon Hall	6 ft 5 in (1.96 m)	203 lb (92 kg)	RS Fr	Cape Henry Collegiate	Virginia Beach, Virginia
G	1	Justin Anderson	6 ft 6 in (1.98 m)	228 lb (103 kg)	Jr	Montrose Christian	Montross, Virginia
G	2	B. J. Stith	6 ft 5 in (1.96 m)	205 lb (93 kg)	Fr	Oak Hill Academy	Lawrenceville, Virginia
G	4	Marial Shayok	6 ft 5 in (1.96 m)	207 lb (94 kg)	Fr	Blair Academy	Ottawa, Ontario
F	5	Darion Atkins (C)	6 ft 8 in (2.03 m)	241 lb (109 kg)	Sr	Landon School	Clinton, Maryland
F/C	10	Mike Tobey	7 ft 0 in (2.13 m)	253 lb (115 kg)	Jr	Blair Academy	Monroe, New York
F	11	Evan Nolte	6 ft 8 in (2.03 m)	224 lb (102 kg)	Jr	Milton HS	Milton, Georgia
F	13	Anthony Gill (C)	6 ft 8 in (2.03 m)	230 lb (104 kg)	RS Jr	Charlotte Christian/South Carolina	High Point, North Carolina
G	15	Malcolm Brogdon (C)	6 ft 5 in (1.96 m)	215 lb (98 kg)	RS Jr	Greater Atlanta Christian	Norcross, Georgia
F	21	Isaiah Wilkins	6 ft 7 in (2.01 m)	224 lb (102 kg)	Fr	Greater Atlanta Christian	Atlanta, Georgia
G	22	Maleek Frazier (W)	5 ft 10 in (1.78 m)	170 lb (77 kg)	Sr	The Covenant School	Charlottesville, Virginia
G	23	Rob Vozenilek (W)	6 ft 2 in (1.88 m)	190 lb (86 kg)	Sr	St. Christopher's	Richmond, Virginia
F	24	Caid Kirven (W)	6 ft 9 in (2.06 m)	226 lb (103 kg)	Jr	Woodberry Forest	Raleigh, North Carolina
G	32	London Perrantes	6 ft 2 in (1.88 m)	191 lb (87 kg)	So	Crespi Carmelite HS	Los Angeles, California
C	33	Jack Salt (redshirt)	6 ft 11 in (2.11 m)	235 lb (107 kg)	Fr	Westlake Boys HS	Auckland, New Zealand
F	34	Jeff Jones (W)	6 ft 6 in (1.98 m)	195 lb (88 kg)	So	St. Anne's-Belfield School	Charlottesville, Virginia
G	51	Darius Thompson (I) (redshirt)	6 ft 4 in (1.93 m)	192 lb (87 kg)	So	Blackman HS/Tennessee	Murfreesboro, Tennessee

Head coach

- Tony Bennett (Green Bay)

Assistant coach(es)

- Ritchie McKay (Seattle Pacific)
- Ron Sanchez (SUNY-Oneonta)
- Jason Williford (Virginia)

Strength and conditioning coach(es)

- Mike Curtis (Virginia)

Athletic trainer(s)

- Ethan Saliba (Kansas)

Legend

- (C) Team captain
- (S) Suspended
- (I) Ineligible
- (W) Walk-on
- Injured
- Current redshirt

Roster
Last update: 31 January 2015

=== Depth chart ===
Pos.	Starting 5	Bench
F/C	Anthony Gill	Mike Tobey
F	Darion Atkins	Isaiah Wilkins
G/F	Justin Anderson	Evan Nolte
G	Malcolm Brogdon	Marial Shayok
PG	London Perrantes	Devon Hall

== Schedule ==
Date time, TV	Rank^{#}	Opponent^{#}	Result	Record	High points	High rebounds	High assists	Site (attendance) city, state
Non-conference regular season
Nov. 14*; 7:00 pm	No. 9	at James Madison	W 79–51	1–0	18 – Anderson	10 – Atkins	4 – Brogdon	JMU Convocation Center (6,782); Harrisonburg, VA
Nov. 16*; 7:00 pm, RSN	No. 9	Norfolk State; Barclays Center Classic	W 67–39	2–0	11 – Anderson	8 – Gill	4 – Tied	John Paul Jones Arena (12,845); Charlottesville, VA
Nov. 18*; 7:00 pm, RSN	No. 9	South Carolina State	W 75–55	3–0	17 – Tied	8 – Tied	3 – Brogdon	John Paul Jones Arena (12,493); Charlottesville, VA
Nov. 21*; 7:00 pm, ESPN3	No. 9	George Washington	W 59–42	4–0	18 – Anderson	11 – Atkins	3 – Perrantes	John Paul Jones Arena (13,706); Charlottesville, VA
Nov. 25*; 7:00 pm, ESPN3	No. 8	Tennessee State; Barclays Center Classic	W 79–36	5–0	20 – Anderson	16 – Tobey	3 – Brogdon	John Paul Jones Arena (12,056); Charlottesville, VA
Nov. 28*; 9:30 pm, NBCSN	No. 8	vs. La Salle; Barclays Center Classic	W 64–56	6–0	20 – Brogdon	10 – Gill	3 – Tied	Barclays Center (4,118); Brooklyn, NY
Nov. 29*; 9:30 pm, NBCSN	No. 8	vs. Rutgers; Barclays Center Classic	W 45–26	7–0	13 – Tied	7 – Tied	4 – Perrantes	Barclays Center (4,105); Brooklyn, NY
Dec. 3*; 9:15 pm, ESPN2	No. 7	at No. 21 Maryland; ACC–Big Ten Challenge	W 76–65	8–0	18 – Brogdon	6 – Tied	7 – Perrantes	Xfinity Center (15,371); College Park, MD
Dec. 6*; 2:00 pm, ESPNU	No. 7	at VCU	W 74–57	9–0	21 – Anderson	8 – Tied	9 – Perrantes	Siegel Center (7,647); Richmond, VA
Dec. 18*; 7:00 pm, ESPNU	No. 6	Cleveland State	W 70–54	10–0	16 – Tied	8 – Gill	5 – Perrantes	John Paul Jones Arena (11,812); Charlottesville, VA
Dec. 21*; Noon, ESPNU	No. 6	Harvard	W 76–27	11–0	15 – Tied	10 – Tobey	6 – Brogdon	John Paul Jones Arena (14,593); Charlottesville, VA
Dec. 30*; 6:00 pm, ESPNU	No. 3	Davidson	W 83–72	12–0	25 – Gill	13 – Gill	7 – Perrantes	John Paul Jones Arena (14,593); Charlottesville, VA
ACC regular season
Jan. 3; 5:30 pm, ESPN2	No. 3	at Miami (FL)	W 89–80 ^{2OT}	13–0 (1–0)	26 – Perrantes	12 – Atkins	8 – Perrantes	BankUnited Center (5,377); Miami, FL
Jan. 7; 7:00 pm, ESPN2	No. 3	NC State	W 61–51	14–0 (2–0)	16 – Anderson	9 – Anderson	5 – Perrantes	John Paul Jones Arena (12,929); Charlottesville, VA
Jan. 10; 6:00 pm, ESPN2	No. 3	at No. 13 Notre Dame	W 62–56	15–0 (3–0)	14 – Atkins	8 – Atkins	4 – Brogdon	Edmund P. Joyce Center (9,149); South Bend, IN
Jan. 13; 8:00 pm, ACCN	No. 2	Clemson	W 65–42	16–0 (4–0)	16 – Brogdon	6 – Atkins	3 – Perrantes	John Paul Jones Arena (13,604); Charlottesville, VA
Jan. 17; 2:00 pm, RSN	No. 2	at Boston College	W 66–51	17–0 (5–0)	20 – Brogdon	10 – Gill	6 – Perrantes	Conte Forum (8,112); Chestnut Hill, MA
Jan. 22; 8:00 pm, ACCN	No. 2	Georgia Tech	W 57–28	18–0 (6–0)	13 – Brogdon	8 – Atkins	4 – Tied	John Paul Jones Arena (13,809); Charlottesville, VA
Jan. 25; 1:00 pm, ACCN	No. 2	at Virginia Tech; Commonwealth Clash	W 50–47	19–0 (7–0)	12 – Anderson	7 – Gill	7 – Perrantes	Cassell Coliseum (9,847); Blacksburg, VA
Jan. 31; 7:00 pm, ESPN	No. 2	No. 4 Duke; College GameDay	L 63–69	19–1 (7–1)	17 – Brogdon	6 – Brogdon	5 – Perrantes	John Paul Jones Arena (14,593); Charlottesville, VA
Feb. 2; 7:00 pm, ESPN	No. 3	at No. 12 North Carolina	W 75–64	20–1 (8–1)	17 – Brogdon	7 – Gill	7 – Anderson	Dean Smith Center (20,102); Chapel Hill, NC
Feb. 7; 7:00 pm, ESPN	No. 3	No. 9 Louisville	W 52–47	21–1 (9–1)	15 – Brogdon	8 – Gill	6 – Perrantes	John Paul Jones Arena (14,593); Charlottesville, VA
Feb. 11; 8:00 pm, ACCN	No. 2	at NC State	W 51–47	22–1 (10–1)	15 – Brogdon	9 – Tobey	3 – Brogdon	PNC Arena (19,500); Raleigh, NC
Feb. 14; 2:30 pm, ACCN	No. 2	Wake Forest	W 61–60	23–1 (11–1)	19 – Gill	9 – Brogdon	5 – Brogdon	John Paul Jones Arena (14,593); Charlottesville, VA
Feb. 16; 7:00 pm, ESPN	No. 2	Pittsburgh	W 61–49	24–1 (12–1)	18 – Brogdon	6 – Tied	6 – Perrantes	John Paul Jones Arena (13,953); Charlottesville, VA
Feb. 22; 6:30 pm, ESPNU	No. 2	Florida State	W 51–41	25–1 (13–1)	13 – Gill	9 – Gill	3 – Perrantes	John Paul Jones Arena (14,593); Charlottesville, VA
Feb. 25; 7:00 pm, RSN	No. 2	at Wake Forest	W 70–34	26–1 (14–1)	11 – Gill	7 – Gill	4 – Tied	LJVM Coliseum (10,772); Winston-Salem, NC
Feb. 28; 4:00 pm, ACCN	No. 2	Virginia Tech; Commonwealth Clash	W 69–57	27–1 (15–1)	19 – Brogdon	8 – Brogdon	6 – Perrantes	John Paul Jones Arena (14,245); Charlottesville, VA
Mar. 2; 7:00 pm, ESPN	No. 2	at Syracuse	W 59–47	28–1 (16–1)	17 – Gill	9 – Tied	10 – Perrantes	Carrier Dome (25,338); Syracuse, NY
Mar. 7; 6:30 pm, ESPN	No. 2	at No. 16 Louisville	L 57–59	28–2 (16–2)	17 – Brogdon	7 – Atkins	5 – Perrantes	KFC Yum! Center (22,788); Louisville, KY
ACC Tournament
Mar. 12; Noon, ESPN; ACCN	(1) No. 3	vs. (9) Florida State; Quarterfinals	W 58–44	29–2	11 – Tied	7 – Gill	9 – Perrantes	Greensboro Coliseum (22,026); Greensboro, NC
Mar. 13; 7:00 pm, ESPN; ACCN	(1) No. 3	vs. (5) No. 19 North Carolina; Semifinals	L 67–71	29–3	25 – Brogdon	5 – Brogdon	3 – Perrantes	Greensboro Coliseum (22,026); Greensboro, NC
NCAA tournament
Mar. 20*; 3:10 pm, truTV	(2 E) No. 6	vs. (15 E) Belmont; Second round	W 79–67	30–3	22 – Brogdon	7 – Atkins	3 – Perrantes	Time Warner Cable Arena (16,551); Charlotte, NC
Mar. 22*; 12:10 pm, CBS	(2 E) No. 6	vs. (7 E) No. 23 Michigan State; Third round	L 54–60	30–4	11 – Gill	14 – Atkins	2 – Perrantes	Time Warner Cable Arena (18,482); Charlotte, NC
*Non-conference game. ^{#}Rankings from AP Poll. (#) Tournament seedings in parentheses. E=East Region. All times are in Eastern Time.

== Rankings ==
On April 28, 2014, ESPN's preseason top-25 rankings listed Virginia at seventh in the nation. On August 11, Sporting News ranked Virginia eighth in their preseason poll.

Virginia's #2 ranking on Week 10 (January 12, 2015) was the first time Virginia was ranked in the top two nationally since the week of March 8, 1983.

Ranking movements Legend: ██ Increase in ranking ██ Decrease in ranking ( ) = First-place votes
	Week																			
Poll	Pre	2	3	4	5	6	7	8	9	10	11	12	13	14	15	16	17	18	19	Final
AP	9	9	8	7	6	6	5	3	3	2 (2)	2 (2)	2 (1)	3	2	2	2	2	3	6	N/A
Coaches	8	9	7	6	5	5	5	3	3	2 (1)	2 (1)	2	3	3	3	3	2	4	6	8

== Team players drafted into the NBA ==
Year	Round	Pick	Player	NBA club
2015	1	21	Justin Anderson	Dallas Mavericks
2016	2	36	Malcolm Brogdon	Milwaukee Bucks
2018	2	58	Devon Hall	Oklahoma City Thunder

== Awards and honors ==
Awards by the Atlantic Coast Sports Media Association (ACSMA) were released on March 8. ACC coaches awards were released the following day, and then followed on March 10 with individual awards from the United States Basketball Writers Association. On March 16, USBWA released All-American selections, naming Brogdon to their second team. One week later, USBWA named Bennett the Henry Iba Award winner. On March 27, the National Association of Basketball Coaches released their District 2 awards. On March 30, the Associated Press and NABC named their All-American teams, including Brogdon on both organizations' second teams, and Anderson on the NABC third team.

- Tony Bennett
  - Atlantic Coast Conference Men's Basketball Coach of the Year (ACSMA, ACC Coaches)
  - USBWA District 3 Coach of the Year
  - Henry Iba Award
  - NABC District 2 Coach of the Year
- Justin Anderson
  - All-ACC Second Team (ACSMA, ACC Coaches)
  - USBWA All-District 3 Team
  - NABC All-District 2 First Team
  - NABC Third-Team All-American
- Darion Atkins
  - ACC Defensive Player of the Year (ACSMA)
  - ACC All-Defensive Team (ACSMA)
  - Lefty Driesell Award
- Malcolm Brogdon
  - ACC Co-Defensive Player of the Year (ACC Coaches)
  - All-ACC First Team (ACSMA, ACC Coaches)
  - ACC All-Defensive Team (ACSMA, ACC Coaches)
  - USBWA All-District 3 Team
  - All-ACC tournament Second Team
  - USBWA Second Team All-American
  - NABC All-District 2 First Team
  - NABC Second Team All-American
  - Associated Press Second Team All-American
- Anthony Gill
  - All-ACC Third Team (ACSMA)
  - ACC All-Defensive Team (ACC Coaches)
- London Perrantes
  - All-ACC Honorable Mention (ACSMA)
- Mike Tobey
  - ACC Sixth Man of the Year (ACC Coaches)
