= Virginia Cavaliers men's basketball =

College men's basketball team representing the University of Virginia

Virginia Cavaliers
2026–27 Virginia Cavaliers men's basketball team
- University: University of Virginia
- First season: 1905–06
- Athletic director: Carla Williams
- Head coach: Ryan Odom; 2nd season, 30–6 (.833)
- Location: Charlottesville, Virginia
- Arena: John Paul Jones Arena (capacity: 14,623)
- NCAA division: Division I
- Conference: ACC
- Nickname: Cavaliers (official); Wahoos (unofficial)
- Colors: Orange and blue
- Student section: Hoo Crew
- All-time record: 1,787–1,238–1 (.591)
- NCAA tournament record: 36–26 (.581)

NCAA Division I tournament champions
- 2019
Other NCAA Division I tournament results
Third place	1981
Final Four	1981, 1984, 2019
Elite Eight	1981, 1983, 1984, 1989, 1995, 2016, 2019
Sweet Sixteen	1981, 1982, 1983, 1984, 1989, 1993, 1995, 2014, 2016, 2019
Appearances	1976, 1981, 1982, 1983, 1984, 1986, 1987, 1989, 1990, 1991, 1993, 1994, 1995, 1997, 2001, 2007, 2012, 2014, 2015, 2016, 2017, 2018, 2019, 2021, 2023, 2024, 2026

NIT champions
- 1980, 1992

Conference tournament champions
- ACC: 1976, 2014, 2018

Conference regular-season champions
- SoCon: 1922 ACC: 1981, 1982, 1983, 1995, 2007, 2014, 2015, 2018, 2019, 2021, 2023

Uniforms
Home	Away
Alternate	Alternate

The Virginia Cavaliers men's basketball team is the intercollegiate men's basketball program representing the University of Virginia. The school competes in the Atlantic Coast Conference (ACC) in Division I of the National Collegiate Athletic Association (NCAA). Virginia won the NCAA Tournament Championship in 2019 and won the last ever NCAA Tournament third-place game in 1981. The Cavaliers have been ranked in the Top 5 of the AP Poll more than 100 times since 1980 and have earned seven No. 1 seeds in the NCAA tournament. The team plays home games at the on-campus John Paul Jones Arena (14,623) which opened in 2006. They have been the Cavaliers since 1923, predating the Cleveland Cavaliers of the NBA by half a century.

Virginia was a top program in the early decades of college basketball under the tutelage of Pop Lannigan from 1905 to 1929 and a consistent winner under multi-sport coach Gus Tebell from 1930 to 1951, but the Cavaliers struggled through the 1950s and 1960s before Terry Holland arrived in 1974 to win their first ACC Championship and earn their first NCAA tournament appearance in just his second year. The program has since won 11 ACC season titles, third-most in conference history. Under Tony Bennett, Virginia had four out of five ACC teams to win 16 or more conference games in the 2010s and won its first NCAA Championship.

Many Virginia players have been recognized for their NCAA and NBA successes, with Ralph Sampson and Malcolm Brogdon being named NBA Rookie of the Year. Brogdon is the NBA's eighth 50–40–90 club member and was the NBA Sixth Man of the Year for the Celtics in 2023. Sampson was a multi-time NBA All–Star, the NBA All-Star Game MVP of 1985, and is in the Naismith Memorial Basketball Hall of Fame. At UVA he was the second (Note: Bill Walton of UCLA is the other three-time winner.) (and ACC's only) three-time Naismith College Player of the Year. Trey Murphy III is the eleventh (and ACC's only) 50–40–90 club member. (Note: Murphy's UVA teammate Sam Hauser missed by only .004 in free throw percentage in the same 2021 season.) Brogdon and De'Andre Hunter were named NABC Defensive Player of the Year, Darion Atkins was awarded the Lefty Driesell Award, and Kyle Guy was named NCAA Tournament Most Outstanding Player.

Since 2014, Virginia has won one NCAA Tournament, (Note: Three ACC programs have won an NCAA title in this span: Virginia (2019), North Carolina (2017), Duke (2015).) two ACC Tournaments, (Note: Two programs have won multiple ACC Tournament championships in this span: Duke 4, Virginia 2.) and finished first (or tied for first) in conference standings six times—more than any other ACC men's program. (Note: Three programs have finished first multiple times in this span: Virginia 6, North Carolina 4, Duke 2.)

== History ==
The Wahoos, as they are unofficially known, began their history under the tutelage of a Welshman and American immigrant known best as "Pop", Henry Lannigan. Lannigan began the program in 1905 after training Olympic Games hopefuls in track and field and quickly brought the basketball program into near-dominant form. He led the Cavaliers to a perfect record of 17–0 in 1914–15 and a Southern Conference title in its inaugural season of 1921–22. After reaching prominence the team was invited to help the nationally known Kentucky Wildcats showcase their new Alumni Gymnasium. Virginia dominated Kentucky, 29–16. Inviting Kentucky back to Memorial Gymnasium in 1928, Virginia again won, 31–28. Lannigan held the Virginia record for best career winning percentage by a head coach (254–95 (.728)) until he was surpassed by Tony Bennett, who was hired 104 years after the start of the program.

After Lannigan's sudden death in 1930 and with limited administration interest at the onset of the Great Depression, Virginia basketball did not maintain its momentum into the next several decades. Buzzy Wilkinson scored 32.1 points per game in 1954–55 and is still the all-time ACC leader in scoring per game for both the single-season and career (28.1) categories. He was selected by the Boston Celtics in the 1955 NBA draft. Unfortunately, Virginia teams of the era were not as great at defense and high scoring did not lead to many wins. Likewise, Barry Parkhill was named ACC Men's Basketball Player of the Year in 1971–72 and was drafted in the first round by the Portland Trail Blazers but the program had not regained its early standing.

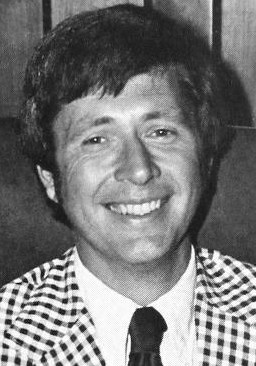
Terry Holland won UVA's first ACC Tournament championship, and led UVA to its first two NCAA Final Fours.

Terry Holland was hired from Davidson in 1975, and with star Wally Walker surprised the ACC in just his second year as head coach when his sixth-seeded Virginia defeated AP No. 17 NC State, No. 9 Maryland and No. 4 North Carolina en route to winning the school's first ACC Championship. Played in Landover, Maryland, it was also and fittingly the first ACC Tournament held outside of North Carolina. Athletic, quick, and seven-foot-four, Ralph Sampson was perhaps the most desired high school recruit in college basketball history when he chose to play with Jeff Lamp at Virginia over Kentucky in 1979. He lived up to that hype would become one of the most dominant college players the game has ever known, winning three consecutive Naismith College Player of the Year awards to tie him with Bill Walton as the most awarded individual player in NCAA history. Virginia would attain its first AP Top 5 rankings and go to its first Final Four in Sampson's era, but would be stonewalled by Dean Smith and North Carolina both in that Final Four and in ACC tournaments. Carolina notoriously held the ball in a four corners offense for most of the last seven minutes of the game, despite having UNC's most celebrated NBA superstars Michael Jordan and James Worthy on the floor, to defeat Virginia in the 1982 ACC tournament 47–45. Both the shot clock and three-point line were implemented into college basketball during the same decade in part to combat such shenanigans. In 1984, after Sampson was drafted first in the 1983 NBA draft, Virginia made a Cinderella run back to the Final Four. There they lost 49–47, in overtime, (Note: This is the only NCAA Tournament game that Virginia has lost in overtime. UVA's record in NCAA Tournament overtime periods is 4–1 as of 2019.) to a Houston team led by the first pick of the 1984 NBA draft, Hakeem Olajuwon, who then joined Sampson to form the original Twin Towers of the NBA on the Houston Rockets.

John Crotty and Bryant Stith took the darkhorse 1988–89 team to the Elite Eight after defeating AP No. 2 (and No. 1 seed) Oklahoma which returned most of its lineup (including Stacey King and Mookie Blaylock) from the team that reached the 1988 NCAA Tournament Championship Game. After Holland retired the next year, the Cavaliers were coached by Jeff Jones for eight years, Pete Gillen for seven, and Dave Leitao for four. Highlights of those teams include a Jones team headlined by Cory Alexander and Junior Burrough that also reached the Elite Eight after a first-place finish in the ACC standings of 1995. There were no championship teams under Gillen, but his recruits Sean Singletary and J. R. Reynolds led the 2007 team to Virginia's next conference-topping finish in Leitao's second season.

Tony Bennett arrived in March 2009 and eventually restored UVA to (and beyond) its former prominence. His teams won UVA's second and third ACC Tournament championships, finished atop the ACC standings six times, and returned to the Final Four to win the 2019 NCAA Tournament championship. During his era, the 2014–15 squad, led by Justin Anderson and Malcolm Brogdon, was the most dominant: starting 19–0, doubling up the scores of Georgia Tech and Wake Forest and nearly tripling the score (76–27) of NCAA Tournament-bound Harvard. In doing so, the 2015 UVA team doubled the score of more ACC opponents than the entire rest of the ACC had in all their combined histories and was the first to do so (even once) in 60 years. However, Anderson broke his finger in the last game of the regular season against Louisville and did not return until the NCAA Tournament where he was much diminished and the team bowed out in the second round. After an Elite Eight appearance, Virginia then suffered a historic loss to a former UVA ballboy, Ryan Odom, and his 16-seed UMBC in the first round of the 2018 NCAA Tournament only to come back and win the 2019 NCAA Tournament for the program's first NCAA Championship the very next year. ESPN called Virginia's 2018–19 campaign "the most redemptive season in the history of college basketball." CBS This Morning called it "basketball's ultimate redemption story" the morning after the national championship game. Kyle Guy was named the NCAA Tournament Most Outstanding Player. De'Andre Hunter became a lottery pick after a convincing title game showdown with Jarrett Culver and was drafted fourth in the 2019 NBA draft. Virginia had four of the five ACC teams to win 16 or more games in the 2010s decade.

In March 2025, Ryan Odom, who guided UMBC to that victory over UVA seven years earlier, was handed the reins to the UVA program after Bennett's surprise retirement.

== NCAA Final Four teams ==
Virginia is 3–2 at Final Four events and won the 2019 NCAA tournament championship.

=== 1981: Sampson and Goliath ===
Led by Coach Terry Holland, National Player of the Year Ralph Sampson and his first team All-ACC teammate Jeff Lamp, the Cavaliers rolled to their best season in school history. After beginning the season with a 23–0 record, the Cavaliers would claim the ACC Regular Season title before falling in the ACC Tournament Semi-finals. Despite the loss, UVA still entered the NCAA tournament as the 1 seed in the East Regional of the 1981 NCAA tournament.

UVA received a first-round bye and squeaked by Villanova 54–50 in the 2nd round. They then handled both Tennessee and Brigham Young by 14 points each in the Sweet 16 and Elite 8 respectively to clinch a berth in the program's first ever Final Four in Philadelphia. Although UVA swept North Carolina in the ACC regular season, the Tar Heels defeated the Cavaliers when it mattered most, in the national semi-finals. Virginia closed the season on a high note, however, defeating Louisiana State in the national third-place game to cap the program's most successful season to that point.

=== 1984: Virginia plays Cinderella ===
Following the loss of their vaunted All-American in Sampson, the Virginia basketball team took a step back in 1983–84, at least in the regular season. The Cavaliers limped into the ACC tournament with a 17–10 (6–8) record, promptly falling to Wake Forest in the first round. Their record was good enough to ensure them an NCAA tournament invite and they were awarded the 7-seed in the East Regional.

After escaping 10th-seeded Iona 58–57 in the first round, Virginia drew 2nd-seeded Arkansas in the 2nd round. The Cavaliers dispatched the Razorbacks 53–51 in an overtime affair before cruising past 3rd-seeded Syracuse 63–55 in the Sweet Sixteen. In a low-scoring, defensive affair, the Cavaliers defeated Bobby Knight's 4th-seeded Indiana Hoosiers 50–48 in the Elite Eight to clinch the school's second Final Four appearance in 4 seasons.

In the National Semi-finals, Virginia drew the Hakeem Olajuwon-led Houston Cougars at the Kingdome in Seattle. The Cavaliers gave the vaunted Phi Slama Jama lineup all they could handle, but eventually fell 49–47 in overtime, ending a surprisingly-successful postseason run.

=== 2019: Redemption National Championship ===
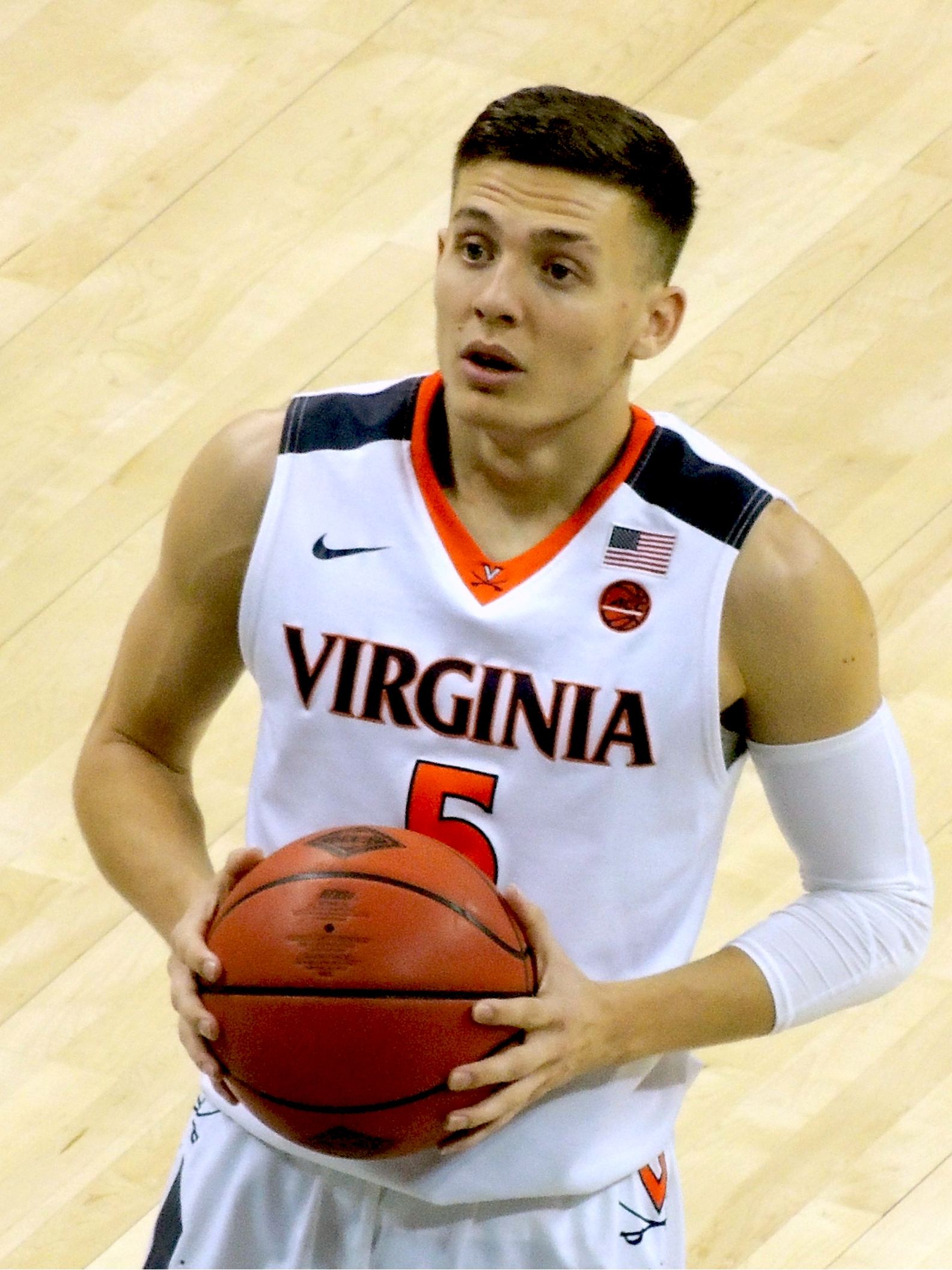
Kyle Guy converted all three free throws with less than a second left in the Final Four game against Auburn; UVA won by one point.

Coming off a loss to 16-seed UMBC a year prior, the Virginia team returned with a vaunted Bennett defense along with the three-pronged offensive attack of De'Andre Hunter, Kyle Guy, and Ty Jerome. The Cavaliers began and ended the season ranked in the AP Top 5, with a 28–2 regular season record and both losses to Zion Williamson's AP No. 1 ranked Duke squad under Coach Krzyzewski. Those two Virginia–Duke matchups during the ACC regular season were the most watched college basketball games of the regular season with 3.8 million and 3.3 million viewers for their games in Durham and Charlottesville respectively. In the ACC Tournament, Virginia defeated bubble team NC State 76–56 before being defeated by Florida State, 69–59. Entering the NCAA Tournament, Virginia was a No. 1 seed in the South region, Duke was the No. 1 overall seed and placed in the East region, while North Carolina also received a No. 1 seed but in the Midwest region. The only No. 1 seed from another conference was Gonzaga in the West, later to be defeated by Texas Tech in the Elite Eight.

Virginia was the sole No. 1 seed of the tournament to advance to the Final Four after defeating Purdue. After first defeating Gardner-Webb, Oklahoma, and Oregon, they met the Boilermakers in the Elite Eight. Purdue's Carsen Edwards scored 42 points against Virginia, setting an individual scoring record against a Bennett-coached team. With Virginia down by three points with 5.9 seconds to play, Ty Jerome stepped to the line for two free throws, converting the first but missing the second. Mamadi Diakite back tapped the ball into the backcourt where Kihei Clark recovered it and passed back to Diakite with one second remaining in the game. Diakite immediately scored, and the game went into overtime. Virginia then outscored Purdue 10–5 in the extra period to advance. Jerome, Diakite, and Kyle Guy each made the South Regional All-Tournament team.

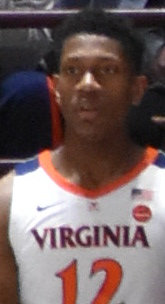
De'Andre Hunter shut down Jarrett Culver and scored a career-high 27 points in the National Championship Game; he soon was the No. 4 pick of the 2019 NBA draft.

In the Final Four, Virginia met the Auburn Tigers who had already dispatched Kansas, North Carolina, and Kentucky to get there. This game was a back-and-forth battle as Virginia trailed the Tigers at halftime, 31–28. Virginia led by as many as 10 points in the second half before Auburn retook the lead late in the game. Down 61–57 with 7.7 seconds remaining, Guy scored a three-point shot from the right corner. Harper then converted one of two free throws to lead 62–60. Two controversial non-calls (one against Auburn, one against Virginia) by officials preceded Auburn being called for a foul with 1.5 seconds remaining. On the in-bounds play Jerome found Guy, again for the corner three, but Guy missed as an Auburn player fouled him by undercutting his lower body. Guy converted all three free throws to put Virginia into the 2019 NCAA Tournament Championship Game.

The National Championship match was headlined by two of the top defenses in college basketball, Virginia and the Texas Tech Red Raiders. Texas Tech did not score a field goal for the first 7 minutes and 11 seconds of the game, but eventually tied the game at 19 with 7 minutes and 33 seconds remaining in the first half. The teams traded leads until halftime, with Virginia holding a 32–29 advantage at intermission. Eventual top-10 picks in the subsequent NBA draft De'Andre Hunter and Jarrett Culver shot 1-for-8 and 0-for-6 from the field respectively in the first half, but Hunter shot 7-for-8 in the second half to end with a career-high 27 points while the NABC Defensive Player of the Year sophomore limited Culver to 5-for-22 shooting and a 15-point total. Texas Tech rallied from a deficit to take a late lead before Virginia scored in the closing seconds to take the game into overtime. Virginia outscored Texas Tech 17–9 in overtime to win their first national title 85–77.

Virginia ended the season with a 35–3 record, breaking the school record for wins in a single-season. The team was 29–0 after leading at halftime. The Cavaliers were the first first-time champions of the NCAA Tournament since the University of Florida thirteen years earlier. In light of the previous year's loss to UMBC, ESPN called Virginia's championship run "the most redemptive season in the history of college basketball," and NBC Sports described it as "the greatest redemption story in the history of sports."

== ACC Tournament championship teams ==
Virginia has won the ACC tournament three times, defeating Duke or North Carolina in each title game.

=== 1976: Miracle in Landover ===
The 1975–76 Cavalier season was largely disappointing as they finished 13–11 overall (4–8, ACC) and limped into the ACC tournament as the 6th seed. Played at the Capital Centre in Landover, Maryland, the tournament was the first in ACC history to be played outside the state of North Carolina.

Despite falling to NC State twice during the regular season, the Cavaliers upset the 3rd-seeded Wolfpack 75–63. The Cavaliers then drew 2-seed Maryland, longtime border rivals that had just defeated UVA five days earlier at Cole Fieldhouse. Virginia defeated the AP No. 9 Terrapins, before dispatching top-seeded and AP No. 4 North Carolina 67–62 in the championship game. It marked the first conference tournament title and NCAA appearance for Virginia, as well as only the 3rd time a non-North Carolina-based team won the conference title (following Maryland in 1958 and South Carolina in 1971). Wally Walker scored 21 points and grabbed 7 rebounds in the title game, being named tournament MVP in the process.

Virginia was awarded the East Region's 7 seed in the NCAA tournament, where they fell to 2nd-seeded DePaul in the first round.

=== 2014: Bennett Ball arrives ===
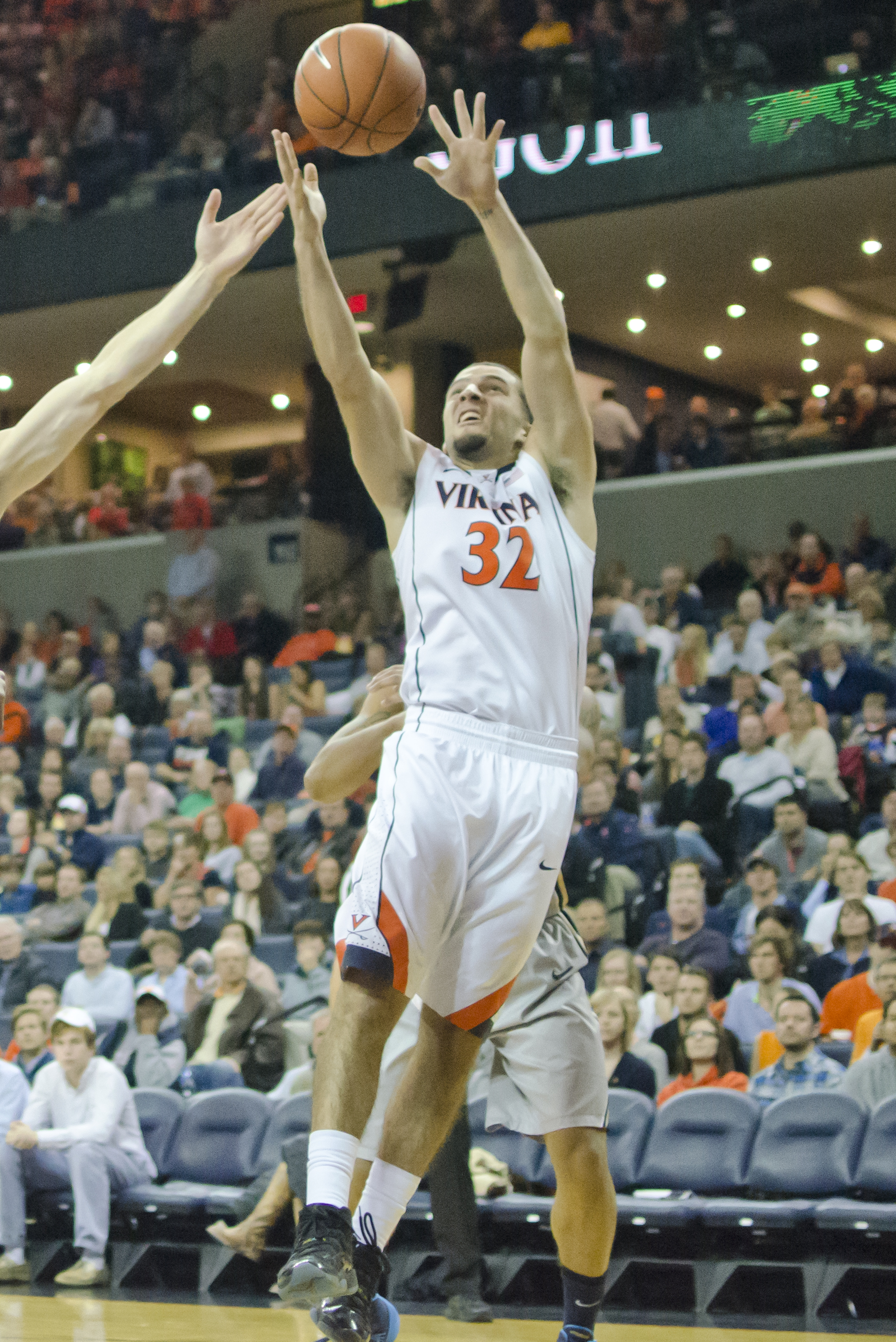
London Perrantes

After a few years of steady improvement, Tony Bennett finally had a team he had fully recruited and coached. The Cavaliers got off to a forgettable 9–4 start, punctuated by a 35-point road loss at Tennessee. Following a pivotal conversation between star G/F Joe Harris and Bennett, UVA got on track and rolled through the ACC. On March 1, the 12th ranked Cavaliers would defeat No. 4 Syracuse at John Paul Jones Arena to clinch the ACC regular season title outright for the first time since 1981, allowing them to enter the 2014 ACC men's basketball tournament as the 1-seed.

After cruising against 8th seeded Florida State, Virginia held off 4th-seeded Pittsburgh in the final seconds of the semi-final, setting up a championship game against 3rd seeded Duke at Greensboro Coliseum. The Cavaliers would exact revenge for a regular season loss to the Blue Devils, defeating them 72–63 and claiming their first ACC tournament title in 38 years. Joe Harris was named tournament MVP while Malcolm Brogdon joined him as a 1st team selection. In the process, UVA defeated every ACC opponent at least once in a season for the first time since 1982.

=== 2018: Calm before the storm ===
After losing all-conference point guard London Perrantes to graduation and the Cleveland Cavaliers, many expected 2017–18 to be a rebuilding year for Virginia basketball. The team would start the season unranked before getting off to an 11–1 non-conference start and climbing up to No. 13 in the country at the start of conference play. Virginia would then become the first team to go 17–1 in conference play, notably snapping a long losing streak at Cameron Indoor Stadium against Duke, scoring 5 points in 0.9 seconds to stun Louisville at the KFC Yum! Center, and only losing one conference game by a single point in overtime.

They would open the ACC tournament by routing 9th-seeded Louisville 75–58 in the quarterfinals before dispatching 4th-seeded Clemson 64–58 in the semis. They would then rematch with a North Carolina team they had defeated earlier in Charlottesville and claim the ACC championship with a 71–63 win. Kyle Guy was named tournament MVP and was joined on the First team by Devon Hall as the Cavaliers gave Tony Bennett his second ACC tournament title in 5 seasons.

== Tournament championships ==
=== NCAA national championships ===
Season	Coach	Site	Championship Game result	Most Outstanding Player	Overall record	ACC record
2018–19	Tony Bennett	U.S. Bank Stadium, Minneapolis	Virginia 85, Texas Tech 77 (OT)	Kyle Guy	35–3	16–2
Total NCAA National championships: 1

2019 NCAA tournament results
Round	Opponent	Score
Round No. 1	#16 Gardner–Webb	71–56
Round No. 2	#9 Oklahoma	63–51
Sweet 16	#12 Oregon	53–49
Elite 8	#3 Purdue	80–75 (OT)
Final 4	#5 Auburn	63–62
Championship	#3 Texas Tech	85–77 (OT)

1992 NIT tournament results
Round	Opponent	Score
Round No. 1	at Villanova	83–80
Round No. 2	Tennessee	77–52
Quarterfinals	New Mexico	76–71
Semifinals	Florida	62–56
Championship	Notre Dame	81–76 (OT)

1980 NIT tournament results
Round	Opponent	Score
Round No. 1	Lafayette	67–56
Round No. 2	Boston College	57–55
Quarterfinals	Michigan	79–68
Semifinals	UNLV	90–71
Championship	Minnesota	58–55

== Seasons ==
=== Results by season (1980–present) ===
Record table
Season	Coach	Overall	Conference	Standing	Postseason
Terry Holland (Atlantic Coast Conference) (1974–1990)
1979–80	Terry Holland	24–10	7–7	5th	NIT Championship
1980–81	Terry Holland	29–4	13–1	1st	NCAA Final Four
1981–82	Terry Holland	30–4	12–2	T–1st	NCAA Sweet Sixteen
1982–83	Terry Holland	29–5	12–2	T–1st	NCAA Elite Eight
1983–84	Terry Holland	21–12	6–8	6th	NCAA Final Four
1984–85	Terry Holland	17–16	3–11	8th	NIT Quarterfinals
1985–86	Terry Holland	19–11	7–7	5th	NCAA First Round
1986–87	Terry Holland	21–10	8–6	4th	NCAA First Round
1987–88	Terry Holland	13–18	5–9	6th	
1988–89	Terry Holland	22–11	9–5	3rd	NCAA Elite Eight
1989–90	Terry Holland	20–12	6–8	5th	NCAA Second Round
Terry Holland:		326–173 (.653)	111–103 (.519)		
Jeff Jones (Atlantic Coast Conference) (1990–1998)
1990–91	Jeff Jones	21–12	6–8	6th	NCAA First Round
1991–92	Jeff Jones	20–13	8–8	5th	NIT Championship
1992–93	Jeff Jones	21–10	9–7	5th	NCAA Sweet Sixteen
1993–94	Jeff Jones	18–13	8–8	4th	NCAA Second Round
1994–95	Jeff Jones	25–9	12–4	T–1st	NCAA Elite Eight
1995–96	Jeff Jones	12–15	6–10	7th	
1996–97	Jeff Jones	18–13	7–9	6th	NCAA First Round
1997–98	Jeff Jones	11–19	3–13	9th	
Jeff Jones:		146–104 (.584)	59–67 (.468)		
Pete Gillen (Atlantic Coast Conference) (1998–2005)
1998–99	Pete Gillen	14–16	4–12	9th	
1999–00	Pete Gillen	19–12	9–7	3rd	NIT First Round
2000–01	Pete Gillen	20–9	9–7	4th	NCAA First Round
2001–02	Pete Gillen	17–12	7–9	5th	NIT First Round
2002–03	Pete Gillen	16–16	6–10	6th	NIT Second Round
2003–04	Pete Gillen	18–13	6–10	8th	NIT Second Round
2004–05	Pete Gillen	14–15	4–12	11th	
Pete Gillen:		118–93 (.559)	45–67 (.402)		
Dave Leitao (Atlantic Coast Conference) (2005–2009)
2005–06	Dave Leitao	15–15	7–9	7th	NIT First Round
2006–07	Dave Leitao	21–11	11–5	T–1st	NCAA Second Round
2007–08	Dave Leitao	17–16	5–11	10th	CBI Semi-finals
2008–09	Dave Leitao	10–18	4–12	11th	
Dave Leitao:		63–60 (.512)	27–37 (.422)		
Tony Bennett (Atlantic Coast Conference) (2009–2024)
2009–10	Tony Bennett	15–16	5–11	9th	
2010–11	Tony Bennett	16–15	7–9	8th	
2011–12	Tony Bennett	22–10	9–7	4th	NCAA First Round
2012–13	Tony Bennett	23–12	11–7	4th	NIT Quarterfinals
2013–14	Tony Bennett	30–7	16–2	1st	NCAA Sweet Sixteen
2014–15	Tony Bennett	30–4	16–2	1st	NCAA Second Round
2015–16	Tony Bennett	29–8	13–5	2nd	NCAA Elite Eight
2016–17	Tony Bennett	23–11	11–7	T–5th	NCAA Second Round
2017–18	Tony Bennett	31–3	17–1	1st	NCAA First Round
2018–19	Tony Bennett	35–3	16–2	T–1st	NCAA Champions
2019–20	Tony Bennett	23–7	15–5	T–2nd	Cancelled
2020–21	Tony Bennett	18–7	13–4	1st	NCAA First Round
2021–22	Tony Bennett	21–14	12–8	6th	NIT Quarterfinals
2022–23	Tony Bennett	25–8	15–5	T–1st	NCAA First Round
2023–24	Tony Bennett	23–11	13–7	3rd	NCAA First Four
Tony Bennett:		364–136 (.728)	189–82 (.697)		
Ron Sanchez (Atlantic Coast Conference) (2024–2025)
2024–25	Ron Sanchez	15–17	8–12	T–9th	
Ron Sanchez:		15–17 (.469)	8–12 (.400)		
Ryan Odom (Atlantic Coast Conference) (2025–Present)
2025–26	Ryan Odom	30–6	15–3	2nd	
Ryan Odom:		30–6 (.833)	15–3 (.833)		
Total:		1789–1238–1 (.591)	536–568 (.486)		
National champion Postseason invitational champion Conference regular season champion Conference regular season and conference tournament champion Division regular season champion Division regular season and conference tournament champion Conference tournament champion

== Postseasons ==
=== NCAA tournament results ===
The Cavaliers have appeared in the NCAA tournament 27 times. Their combined record is 36–26. They were national champions in 2019.

Year	Seed/Region	Round	Opponent	Result
1976	East	First round	DePaul	L 60–69
1981	No. 1 East	Second round Sweet Sixteen; Elite Eight; Final Four; National third place	No. 9 Villanova #4 Tennessee #6 BYU #2 (W) North Carolina #1 (MW) LSU	W 54–40; W 62–48; W 74–60; L 65–78; W 78–74
1982	No. 1 Mideast	Second round Sweet Sixteen	No. 9 Tennessee #4 UAB	W 54–51; L 66–68
1983	No. 1 West	Second round Sweet Sixteen; Elite Eight	No. 8 Washington State #4 Boston College #6 NC State	W 54–49; W 95–92; L 62–63
1984	No. 7 East	First round Second round Sweet Sixteen; Elite Eight; Final Four	No. 10 Iona #2 Arkansas #3 Syracuse #4 Indiana #2 (MW) Houston	W 58–57; W 53–51^{OT} W 63–55; W 50–48; L 47–49^{OT}
1986	No. 5 East	First round	No. 12 DePaul	L 68–72
1987	No. 5 West	First round	No. 12 Wyoming	L 60–64
1989	No. 5 Southeast	First round Second round Sweet Sixteen; Elite Eight	No. 12 Providence #13 Middle Tennessee #1 Oklahoma #3 Michigan	W 100–97; W 104–88; W 86–80; L 65–102
1990	No. 7 Southeast	First round Second round	No. 10 Notre Dame #2 Syracuse	W 75–67; L 61–63
1991	No. 7 West	First round	No. 10 BYU	L 48–61
1993	No. 6 East	First round Second round Sweet Sixteen	No. 11 Manhattan #3 Massachusetts #2 Cincinnati	W 78–66; W 71–56; L 54–71
1994	No. 7 West	First round Second round	No. 10 New Mexico #2 Arizona	W 57–54; L 58–71
1995	No. 4 Midwest	First round Second round Sweet Sixteen; Elite Eight	No. 13 Nicholls State #12 Miami (OH) #1 Kansas #2 Arkansas	W 96–72; W 60–54^{OT} W 67–58; L 61–68
1997	No. 9 West	First round	No. 8 Iowa	L 60–73
2001	No. 5 South	First round	No. 12 Gonzaga	L 85–86
2007	No. 4 South	First round Second round	No. 13 Albany #5 Tennessee	W 84–57; L 74–77
2012	No. 10 West	First round	No. 7 Florida	L 45–71
2014	No. 1 East	Second round Third round Sweet Sixteen	No. 16 Coastal Carolina #8 Memphis #4 Michigan State	W 70–59; W 78–60; L 59–61
2015	No. 2 East	Second round Third round	No. 15 Belmont #7 Michigan State	W 79–67; L 54–60
2016	No. 1 Midwest	First round Second round Sweet Sixteen; Elite Eight	No. 16 Hampton #9 Butler #4 Iowa State #10 Syracuse	W 81–45; W 77–69; W 84–71; L 62–68
2017	No. 5 East	First round Second round	No. 12 UNC Wilmington #4 Florida	W 76–71; L 39–65
2018	No. 1 South	First round	No. 16 UMBC	L 54–74
2019	No. 1 South	First round Second round Sweet Sixteen; Elite Eight; Final Four; National Championship	No. 16 Gardner–Webb #9 Oklahoma #12 Oregon #3 Purdue #5 (MW) Auburn #3 (W) Texas Tech	W 71–56; W 63–51; W 53–49; W 80–75^{OT} W 63–62; W 85–77^{OT}
2021	No. 4 West	First round	No. 13 Ohio	L 58–62
2023	No. 4 South	First round	No. 13 Furman	L 67–68
2024	No. 10 Midwest	First Four	No. 10 Colorado State	L 42–67
2026	No. 3 Midwest	First round Second round	No. 14 Wright State #6 Tennessee	W 82–73; L 72–79

=== NCAA Tournament seeding history ===
Virginia is one of six NCAA programs to earn a No. 1 seed in the NCAA Division I men's basketball tournament seven or more times.

The NCAA began seeding the NCAA Tournament with the 1979 edition. The 64-team field started in 1985, which guaranteed that a championship team had to win six games.

Years →	'81	'82	'83	'84	'86	'87	'89	'90	'91	'93	'94	'95	'97	'01	'07	'12	'14	'15	'16	'17	'18	'19	'21	'23	'24	'26
Seeds →	1	1	1	7	5	5	5	7	7	6	7	4	9	5	4	10	1	2	1	5	1	1	4	4	10	3

#

indicates NCAA championship

=== NIT results ===
The Cavaliers have appeared in the National Invitation Tournament (NIT) 14 times. Their combined record is 19–12. They were NIT champions in 1980 and 1992.

Year	Round	Opponent	Result
1941	Quarterfinals	CCNY	L 35–64
1972	First round	Lafayette	L 71–72
1978	First round	Georgetown	L 68–70^{OT}
1979	First round Second round	Northeast Louisiana; Alabama	W 79–78; L 88–90
1980	First round Second round Quarterfinals; Semifinals; Final	Lafayette; Boston College; Michigan; UNLV; Minnesota	W 67–56; W 57–55; W 79–68; W 90–71; W 58–55
1985	First round Second round Quarterfinals	West Virginia; Saint Joseph's; Tennessee	W 56–55; W 68–61; L 54–61
1992	First round Second round Quarterfinals; Semifinals; Final	Villanova; Tennessee; New Mexico; Florida; Notre Dame	W 83–80; W 77–52; W 76–71; W 62–56; W 81–76^{OT}
2000	First round	Georgetown	L 111–115^{3OT}
2002	First round	South Carolina	L 74–67
2003	First round Second round	Brown; St. John's	W 89–73; L 63–73
2004	First round Second round	George Washington; Villanova	W 79–66; L 63–73
2006	Opening round	Stanford	L 49–65
2013	First round Second round Quarterfinals	Norfolk State; St. John's; Iowa	W 67–56; W 68–50; L 64–75
2022	First round Second round Quarterfinals	Mississippi State; North Texas; St. Bonaventure	W 60–57; W 71–69^{OT} L 51–52

=== CBI results ===
The Cavaliers appeared in the inaugural College Basketball Invitational (CBI), in 2008. Their record is 2–1.

Year	Seed	Round	Opponent	Result
2008	No. 1	First round Quarterfinals; Semifinals	Richmond; Old Dominion; Bradley	W 66–64; W 80–76; L 85–96

== Rivalries ==
=== Annual Home-and-Away Series ===
==== Louisville Cardinals ====
Following conference realignment, the Cardinals moved from the Big East to the ACC and were designated UVA's home-and-away rivals. The two programs had previously had two consecutive home-and-away series in 1982, 1983, 1984, and 1985, with the Cavaliers winning all four games. Justin Anderson's injury during the March 2015 matchup derailed No. 2 Virginia's national championship aspirations, while an improbable March 2018 Virginia victory—scoring five points in the final 0.9 seconds at Louisville's KFC Yum! Center—ended the Cardinals' NCAA tournament hopes. Both rivals have won recent NCAA Championships—Louisville in 2013 (vacated) and Virginia in 2019. UVA leads the all-time series 23–7 as of 2025.

==== Virginia Tech Hokies ====
As the Commonwealth's two power conference teams, the Cavaliers and Hokies have a long-standing rivalry. When the teams were in separate conferences this rivalry often played out on neutral courts across the Commonwealth, such as in Richmond, Roanoke, and Hampton. The all-time series record is well in favor of UVA, with the Cavaliers leading the series 99–61 as of 2025.

=== Other rivalries ===
==== North Carolina Tar Heels ====
As the two oldest universities of the ACC, the UVA–UNC rivalry spans many sports and has persisted to varying degrees since the late 1800s. The early 1980s were a particular highlight for the basketball series as all-time greats Ralph Sampson and Michael Jordan led two Top 5 programs of the era. The two teams defeated each other for ACC Tournament Championships in 2016 and 2018, and the winner of those conference title matches went on to win NCAA Championships the following year (North Carolina in 2017, Virginia in 2019).

==== Maryland Terrapins ====
Thanks to the proximity of these two long-time ACC members, and their status as Tobacco Road outsiders, Maryland and Virginia have a long-standing rivalry spanning many decades. Traditionally, these two schools would meet in the last game of the season, acting as spoilers to each other as they sought ACC season championships and NCAA Tournament appearances. This rivalry has been diminished since Maryland's move to the Big Ten Conference in 2014, but they have matched up three times since, with Virginia winning each of those three.

== Coaches ==
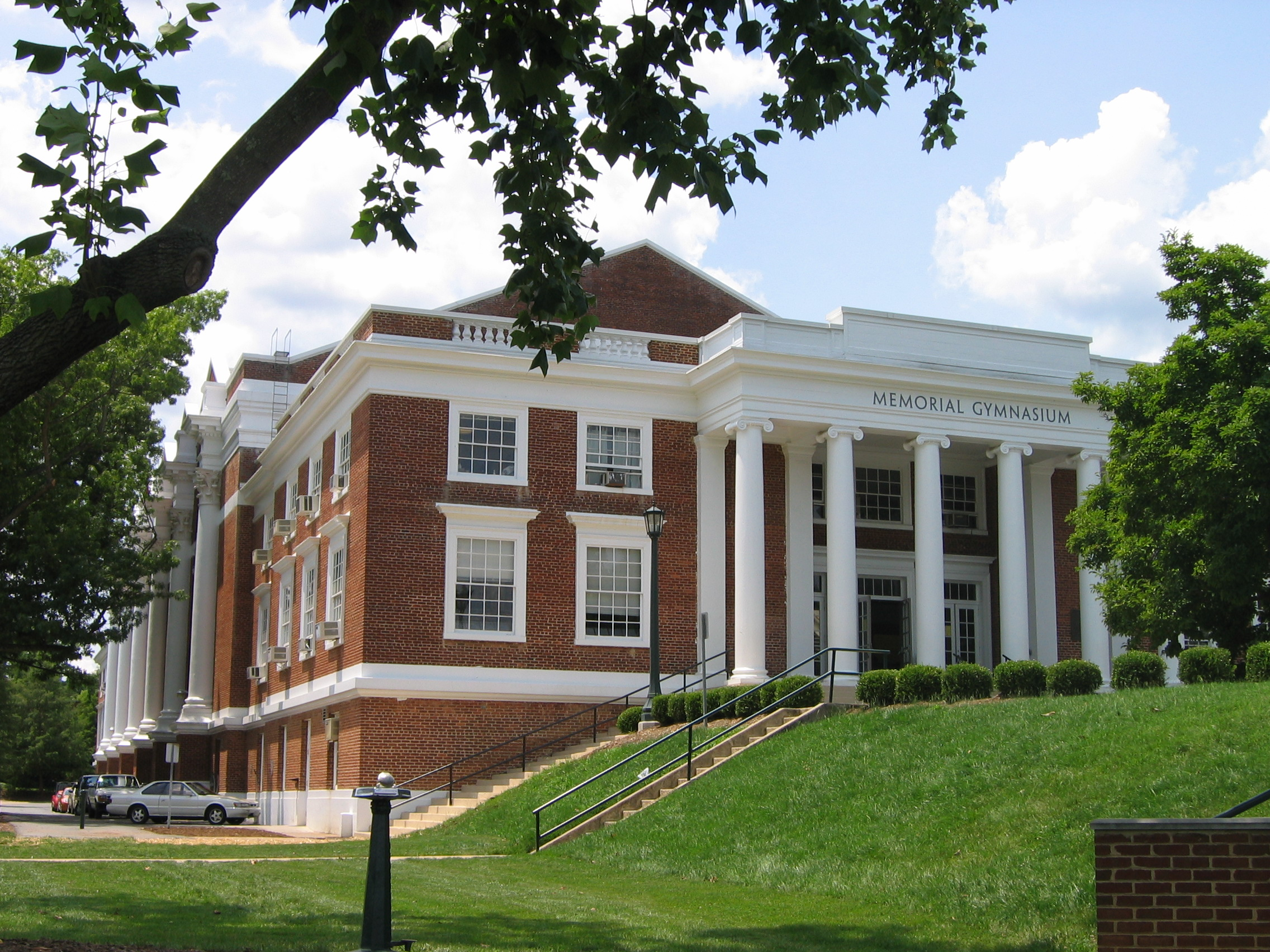
Memorial Gym, UVA's home court from 1924 until 1965

Virginia has had 11 permanent (and 2 interim) head coaches lead the Cavaliers. The longest tenure was Pop Lannigan, who coached the team for 24 years starting in 1905.

Head coach	Years	Win–loss	Pct.
Henry Lannigan	1905–1929	254–95–1	.727
Roy Randall †	1929–1930	3–12	.200
Gus Tebell	1930–1951	241–190	.559
Evan Male	1951–1957	67–88	.432
Billy McCann	1957–1963	40–106	.274
Bill Gibson	1963–1974	120–158	.432
Terry Holland	1974–1990	326–173	.653
Jeff Jones	1990–1998	146–104	.584
Pete Gillen	1998–2005	118–93	.559
Dave Leitao	2005–2009	63–60	.512
Tony Bennett	2009–2024	364–136	.728
Ron Sanchez †	2024–2025	15–17	.469
Ryan Odom	2025–	30–6	.833

† Interim head coaches until permanent head coaches were hired

== Statistics ==
Overall
Years of basketball	118
First season	1905–06
Head coaches (all-time)	12
All Games
All-time record	1770–1234–1 (.589)
20+ win seasons	29 (1928, 1972, 1978, 1980, 1981, 1982, 1983, 1984, 1987, 1989, 1990, 1991, 1992, 1993, 1995, 2001, 2007, 2012, 2013, 2014, 2015, 2016, 2017, 2018, 2019, 2020, 2022, 2023, 2024)
30+ win seasons	5 (1982, 2014, 2015, 2018, 2019)
Home Games
John Paul Jones Arena (2006–present)	265–63 (.808)
University Hall (1965–2006)	402–143 (.738)
Memorial Gymnasium (1924–1965)	279–157 (.640)
Fayerweather Gymnasium (1905–1924)	134–19 (.876)
Conference Games
Southern Conference record (1921–1937)	73–79 (.480)
SoCon regular season championship	1 (1922)
ACC record (1953–present)	523–566 (.480)
ACC regular season championships	11 (1981, 1982, 1983, 1995, 2007, 2014, 2015, 2018, 2019, 2021, 2023)
ACC tournament championships	3 (1976, 2014, 2018)
ACC Players of the Year	5 (Parkhill 1972; Sampson 1981, 1982, 1983; Brogdon 2016)
NCAA Tournament
NCAA Appearances	26
NCAA W–L record	35–25 (.583)
Sweet Sixteen	10 (1981, 1982, 1983, 1984, 1989, 1993, 1995, 2014, 2016, 2019)
Elite Eight	7 (1981, 1983, 1984, 1989, 1995, 2016, 2019)
Final Four	3 (1981, 1984, 2019)
National Championships	1 (2019)
National Invitation Tournament
NIT Appearances	14
NIT W–L record	19–12 (.613)
NIT Championships	2 (1980, 1992)
Accurate through January 7, 2026

== Individual honors ==
=== National honors ===
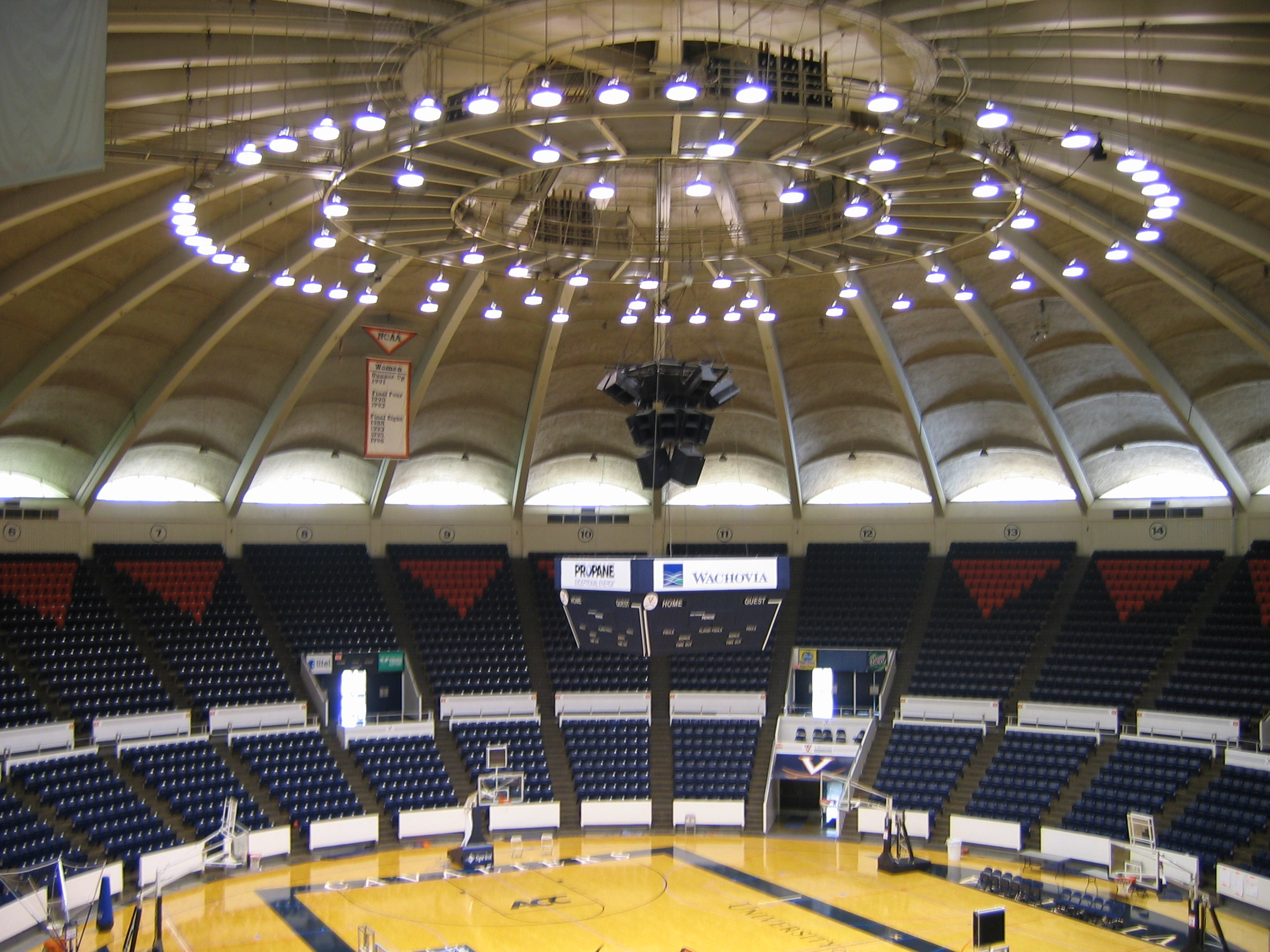
University Hall, UVA's home court from 1965 until 2006

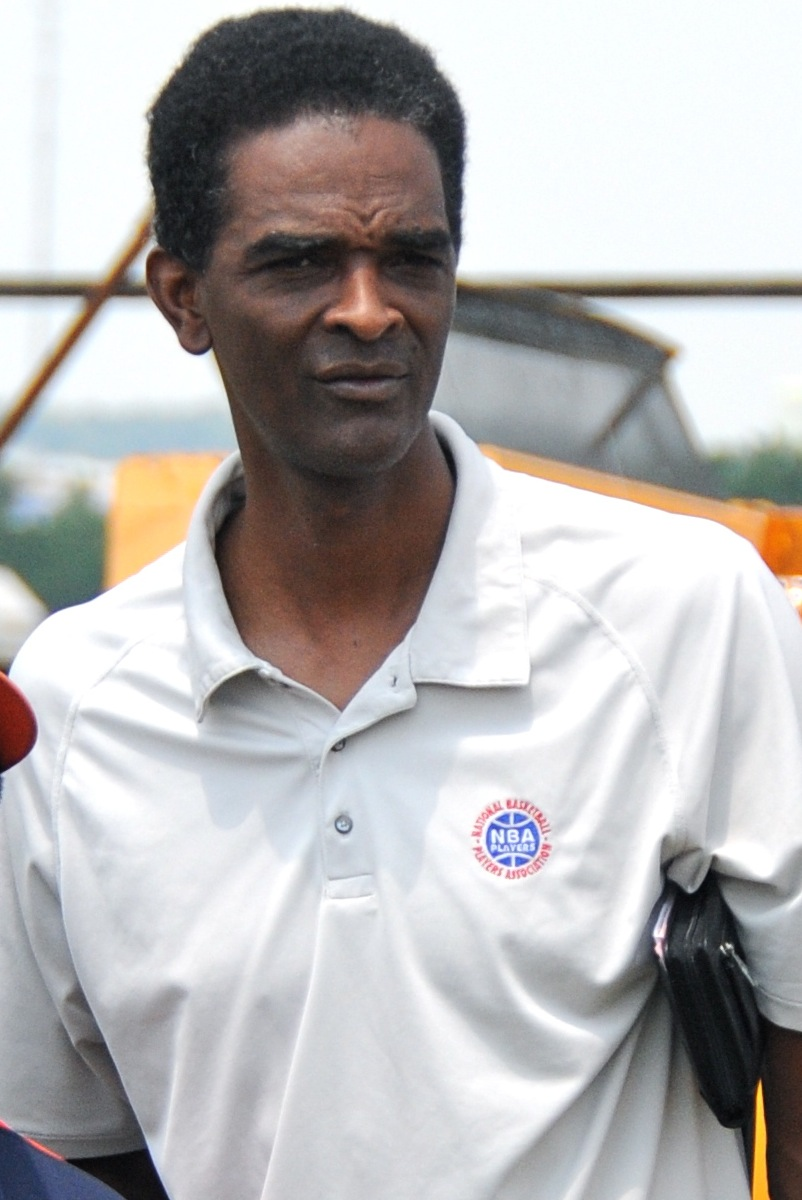
Ralph Sampson, one of the most decorated players in college basketball history

Naismith College Player of the Year
1981	Ralph Sampson
1982	Ralph Sampson
1983	Ralph Sampson
Oscar Robertson Trophy
1981	Ralph Sampson
1982	Ralph Sampson
1983	Ralph Sampson
John R. Wooden Award
1982	Ralph Sampson
1983	Ralph Sampson
Adolph Rupp Trophy
1981	Ralph Sampson
1982	Ralph Sampson
1983	Ralph Sampson
NABC Defensive Player of the Year
2016	Malcolm Brogdon
2019	De'Andre Hunter
Lefty Driesell Award
2015	Darion Atkins
All-American
1915	William Strickling
1955	Buzzy Wilkinson
1972	Barry Parkhill
1973	Barry Parkhill
1980	Jeff Lamp & Ralph Sampson
1981	Jeff Lamp & Ralph Sampson^{*}
1982	Ralph Sampson^{*}
1983	Ralph Sampson^{*}
2008	Sean Singletary^{**}
2012	Mike Scott
2015	Malcolm Brogdon & Justin Anderson
2016	Malcolm Brogdon^{*}
2018	Kyle Guy
2019	Kyle Guy, De'Andre Hunter & Ty Jerome^{**}
Academic All-American
1973	Jim Hobgood
1976	Wally Walker
1980	Lee Raker
1981	Jeff Lamp & Lee Raker

^*Consensus First-Team All-American.
^**AP Honorable-Mention All-American.

=== Retired numbers ===
The Cavaliers have retired eight numbers to date:

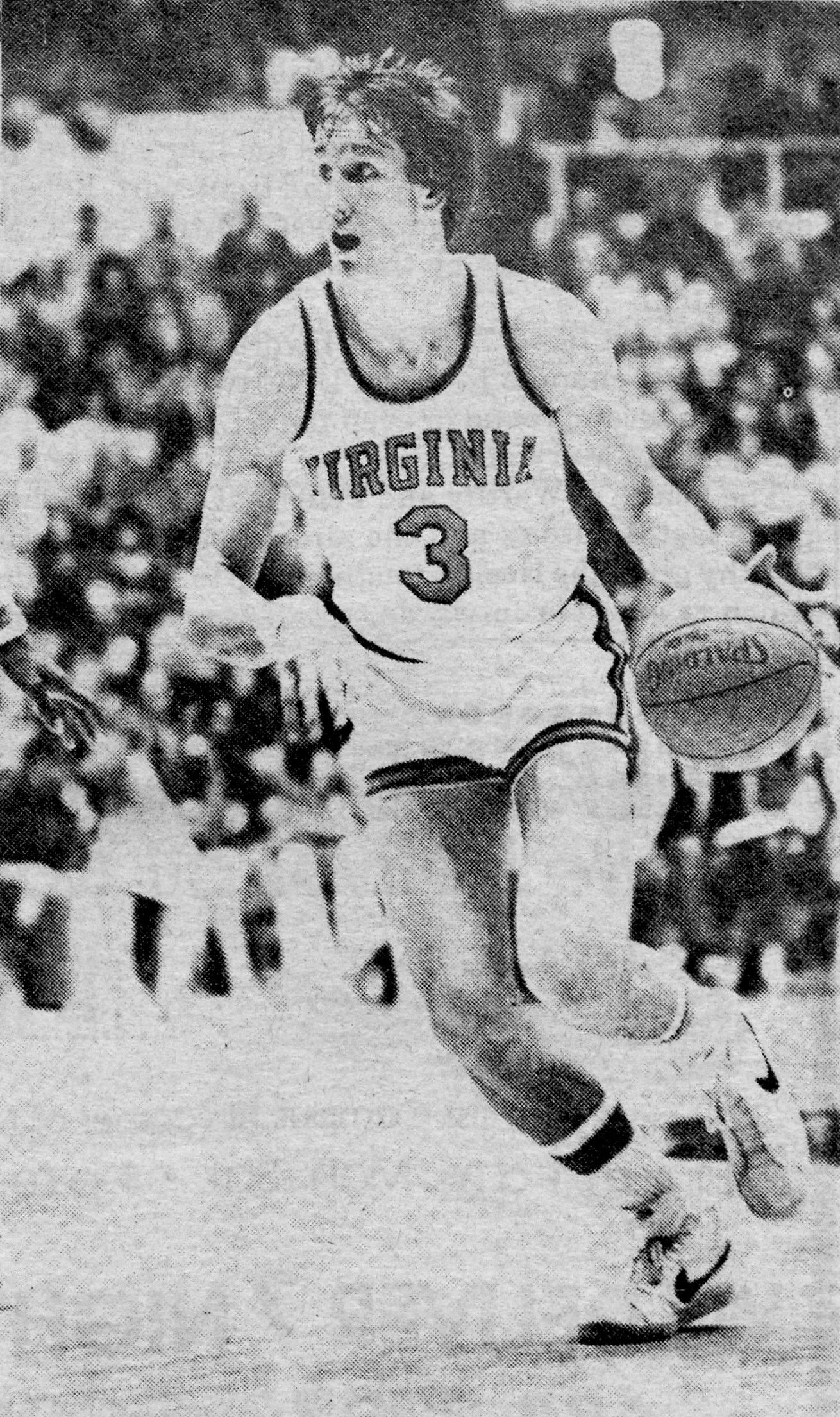
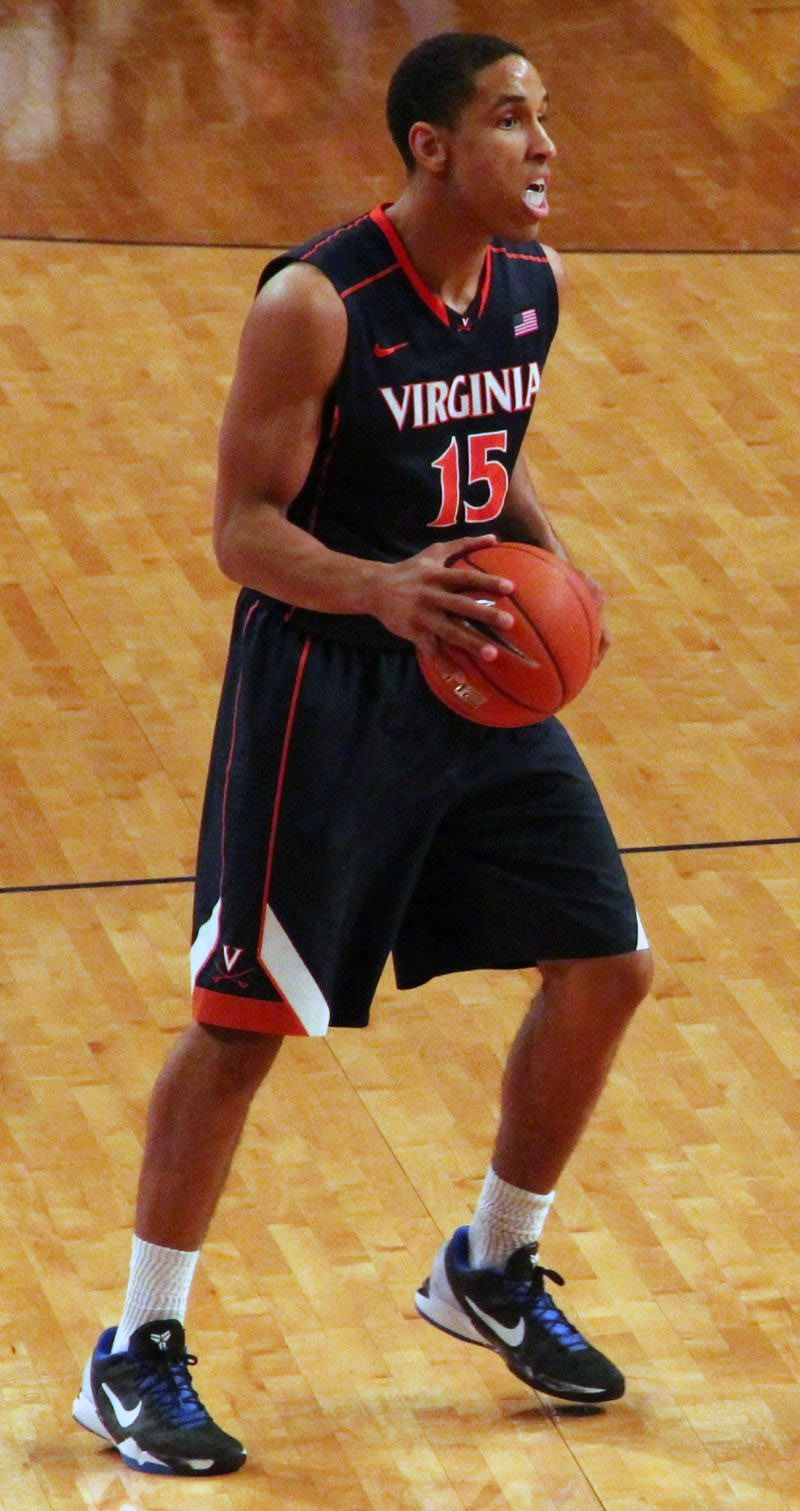
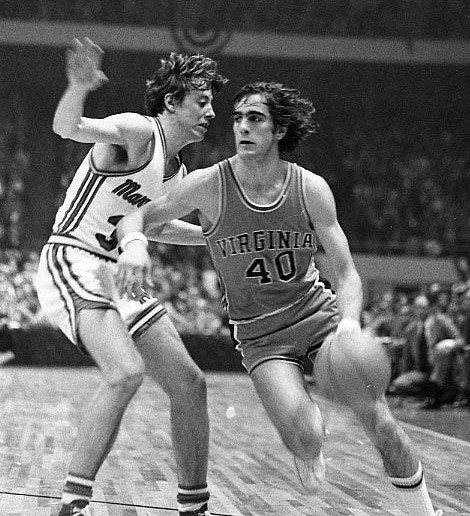
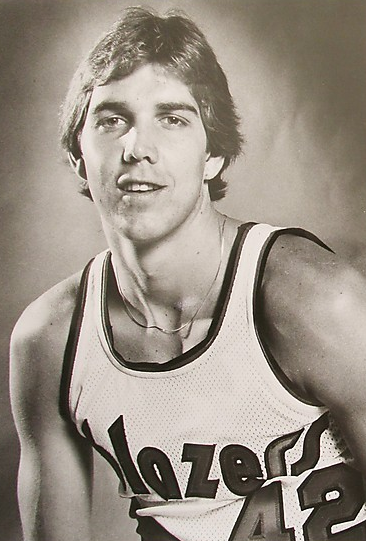
Ftl: Jeff Lamp, Malcolm Brogdon, Barry Parkhill, and Wally Walker, whose numbers were retired by Virginia

Virginia Cavaliers retired numbers
No.	Player	Pos.	Career
3	Jeff Lamp	SG	1977–81
14	Buzzy Wilkinson	G	1951–54
15	Malcolm Brogdon	G	2011–16
20	Bryant Stith	SG	1988–92
40	Barry Parkhill	G	1969–73
41	Wally Walker	F	1972–76
44	Sean Singletary	PG	2004–08
50	Ralph Sampson	C	1979–83

=== Retired jerseys ===
The University of Virginia's athletic department has issued the following statement distinguishing "retired jerseys" from "retired numbers": "Jersey retirement honors Virginia players who have significantly impacted the program. Individuals recognized in this way will have their jerseys retired, but their number will remain active."

Virginia Cavaliers retired jerseys
No.	Player	Pos.	Career
5	Curtis Staples	SG	1994–1998
44	Sean Singletary	PG	2004–2008
