= Ron Sanchez =

Dominican basketball coach

Current position
- Title: Associate head coach
- Team: Baylor Bears
- Conference: Big 12

Biographical details
- Born: 1972 or 1973 (age 53–54); San Pedro de Macorís, Dominican Republic

Playing career
- 1993–1996: SUNY Oneonta

Coaching career (HC unless noted)
- 1996–1999: SUNY Oneonta (asst.)
- 1999–2001: SUNY Delhi (asst.)
- 2001–2003: Indiana (asst.)
- 2003–2009: Washington State (asst.)
- 2009–2018: Virginia (asst.)
- 2018–2023: Charlotte
- 2023–2024: Virginia (associate HC)
- 2024–2025: Virginia (interim HC)
- 2025–present: Baylor (associate HC)

Head coaching record
- Overall: 87–95 (.478)
- Tournaments: 4–0 (CBI)

Accomplishments and honors

Championships
- CBI (2023)

Ron Sanchez is a college basketball coach who serves as the associate head coach for the Baylor Bears men's basketball team of the Big 12 Conference. He previously served as the interim head coach for the Virginia Cavaliers men's basketball team, as he was appointed in October 2024 following Tony Bennett's surprise retirement.

Sanchez also served as the head coach of the men's basketball team at the University of North Carolina at Charlotte from 2018 until he resigned following a 22–14 season to rejoin the University of Virginia as assistant head coach on June 6, 2023.

== Playing career ==
Sanchez attended James Monroe High School in the Bronx and played collegiately at State University of New York at Oneonta where he was a two-time State University of New York Athletic Conference all-conference selection, and SUNYAC Player of the Year for the 1995–96 season. He was inducted into the Red Dragons' athletic hall of fame in 2007.

== Coaching career ==
After graduation, Sanchez assisted his alma mater for three seasons, before taking an assistant coaching position at State University of New York at Delhi from 1999 to 2001. While completing his master's degree studies, Sanchez served as a volunteer assistant coach at Indiana under Mike Davis and was on staff during the Hoosiers' national runner-up season in 2002.

After Indiana, Sanchez joined Dick Bennett's staff at Washington State as director of basketball operations, and was elevated to assistant coach when Tony Bennett took over the helm of the Cougars, where he was a part of the team's 2007-08 Sweet 16 squad. Sanchez followed Bennett to Virginia, served as assistant coach from 2009 to 2018, and was part of three Atlantic Coast Conference (ACC) regular season championship seasons, two ACC tournament championships, and six NCAA tournament teams including an Elite Eight run in the 2016 NCAA tournament.

=== Charlotte ===
On March 19, 2018, Sanchez was named the 11th head coach in Charlotte men's basketball history. On June 6, 2023, he resigned after winning the CBI Championship in a 22–14 season and rejoined Bennett's staff at Virginia as associate head coach.

=== Interim Head Coach at Virginia ===
On October 18, 2024, Bennett unexpectedly announced his retirement from UVA and Sanchez was elevated to interim head coach for the season. He was not retained following the conclusion of the season.

=== Baylor ===
On May 30, 2025, Baylor hired Sanchez to serve under Scott Drew as the associate head coach of the men's basketball team.

== Head coaching record ==
Record table
Season	Team	Overall	Conference	Standing	Postseason
Charlotte 49ers (Conference USA) (2018–2023)
2018–19	Charlotte	8–21	5–13	13th	
2019–20	Charlotte	16–13	10–8	4th	
2020–21	Charlotte	9–16	5–11	11th	
2021–22	Charlotte	17–14	10–8	8th	
2022–23	Charlotte	22–14	9–11	5th	CBI Champion
Charlotte:		72–78 (.480)	39–51 (.433)		
Virginia Cavaliers (Atlantic Coast Conference) (2024–2025)
2024–25	Virginia	15–17	8–12	T–9th	
Virginia:		15–17 (.469)	8–12 (.400)		
Total:		87–95 (.478)			
National champion Postseason invitational champion Conference regular season champion Conference regular season and conference tournament champion Division regular season champion Division regular season and conference tournament champion Conference tournament champion
