= 2024–25 Syracuse Orange men's basketball team =

American college basketball season

2024–25 Syracuse Orange men's basketball
- Conference: Atlantic Coast Conference
- Record: 14–19 (7–13 ACC)
- Head coach: Adrian Autry (2nd season)
- Assistant coaches: Dan Engelstad; Allen Griffin; Brenden Straughn
- Home arena: JMA Wireless Dome

2024–25 ACC men's basketball standings
	Conf.				Overall
Team	W		L	PCT	W		L	PCT
No. 3 Duke †	19	–	1	.950	35	–	4	.897
No. 21 Louisville	18	–	2	.900	27	–	8	.771
No. 22 Clemson	18	–	2	.900	27	–	7	.794
Wake Forest	13	–	7	.650	21	–	11	.656
North Carolina	13	–	7	.650	23	–	14	.622
SMU	13	–	7	.650	24	–	11	.686
Stanford	11	–	9	.550	21	–	14	.600
Georgia Tech	10	–	10	.500	17	–	17	.500
Virginia	8	–	12	.400	15	–	17	.469
Virginia Tech	8	–	12	.400	13	–	19	.406
Florida State	8	–	12	.400	17	–	15	.531
Notre Dame	8	–	12	.400	15	–	18	.455
Pittsburgh	8	–	12	.400	17	–	15	.531
Syracuse	7	–	13	.350	14	–	19	.424
California	6	–	14	.300	14	–	19	.424
NC State	5	–	15	.250	12	–	19	.387
Boston College	4	–	16	.200	12	–	19	.387
Miami (FL)	3	–	17	.150	7	–	24	.226
† 2025 ACC tournament winner Rankings from AP poll

The 2024–25 Syracuse Orange men's basketball team represented Syracuse University during the 2024–25 NCAA Division I men's basketball season. The Orange, led by second-year head coach Adrian Autry, played their home games at JMA Wireless Dome in Syracuse, New York as twelfth-year members of the Atlantic Coast Conference.

The Orange started the season with three wins, including a double-overtime victory over Youngstown State. They then made the trip to Brooklyn to participate in the Legends Classic. They lost to Texas 70–66 and Texas Tech 79–74 to finish in fourth place. After a victory over Cornell, the Orange lost in the ACC–SEC Challenge to third-ranked Tennessee and they lost their ACC opener to Notre Dame 69–64. They went 2–2 in their final four non-conference games with wins against Albany and Bucknell while losing to Georgetown and Maryland.

The Orange began the meat of the ACC season by going 3–3. They defeated Georgia Tech, Boston College, and Notre Dame, while losing to Wake Forest, Florida State, and Louisville. They went 2–4 over their next six games, with wins at California and a triple-overtime victory over Boston College. They lost by four points to Pittsburgh and to second-ranked Duke during the stretch. Their fortunes didn't improve during the final stretch of the season as they went 2–5. The Orange defeated NC State and Virginia, on the final day of the season. They had a close loss to SMU, losing by just two points, and an overtime loss to Virginia Tech.

The Orange finished the season 14–19 and 7–13 in ACC play to finish in fourteenth place. As the fourteenth seed in the 2025 ACC tournament they defeated Florida State 66–62 in the First Round. In the Second Round, they faced SMU in a rematch of a game played just eight days earlier. This game was not as close, as the Orange lost 73–53. They were not invited to the NCAA tournament or the NIT.

The Syracuse Orange drew an average home attendance of 18,888, the 5th-highest of all college basketball teams.

== Previous season ==
The Orange finished the 2023–24 season 20–12 and 11–9 in ACC play to finish in a three-way tie for fifth place. Syracuse lost the tiebreaker and was the seventh seed in the ACC tournament. They faced tenth-seed NC State for the third time this season in the Second Round and NC State avenged both regular season losses by defeating the Orange 83–65. They were not invited to the NCAA tournament and they were eligible to participate in the NIT Tournament, but they opted not to participate.

== Offseason ==
=== Departures ===
Departures
Name	Number	Pos.	Height	Weight	Year	Hometown	Reason for departure
Maliq Brown	1	F	6'9"	222	Junior	Culpeper, Virginia	Transferred to Duke
Judah Mintz	3	G	6'4"	188	Sophomore	Fort Washington, Maryland	Declared for 2024 NBA draft
Justin Taylor	5	G	6'6"	218	Sophomore	Charlottesville, Virginia	Transferred to James Madison
Benny Williams	13	F	6'10"	210	Junior	Bowie, Maryland	Dismissed from team
William Patterson	21	C	7'2"	220	Freshman	Brooklyn, New York	Transferred to High Point
Peter Carey	23	C	6'11"	205	Sophomore	Sunderland, Massachusetts	Transferred to Siena
Quadir Copeland	24	G	6'6"	200	Sophomore	Philadelphia, Pennsylvania	Transferred to McNeese
Mounir Hima	55	C	6'11"	230	Junior	Tillaberi, Niger	Transferred to Howard

=== Incoming transfers ===
Incoming transfers
Name	Number	Pos.	Height	Weight	Year	Hometown	Previous school
Lucas Taylor	3	G	6'5"	195	Senior	Wake Forest, North Carolina	Georgia State
Jaquan Carlos	5	G	6'0"	170	Senior	Brooklyn, New York	Hofstra
Jyáre Davis	13	F	6'7"	215	Graduate Student	Newark, Delaware	Delaware
Chaz Owens	30	F	6'5"	205	Graduate Student	Blue Bell, Pennsylvania	Ranger
Eddie Lampkin Jr.	44	C	6'11"	265	Graduate Student	Houston, Texas	Colorado

=== 2024 recruiting class ===
College recruiting
Name	Hometown	School	Height	Weight	Commit date
Donavan Freeman #13 PF	Washington, DC	IMG Academy	6 ft 7 in (2.01 m)	190 lb (86 kg)	May 11, 2023
Donavan Freeman #13 PF	Recruit ratings: Rivals: 247Sports: ESPN: (87)				
Elijah Moore #50 SG	Bronx, NY	Cardinal Hayes High School	6 ft 4 in (1.93 m)	175 lb (79 kg)	Jan 27, 2023
Elijah Moore #50 SG	Recruit ratings: Rivals: 247Sports: ESPN: (80)				
Overall recruit ranking:
Note: In many cases, Scout, Rivals, 247Sports, On3, and ESPN may conflict in their listings of height and weight.; In these cases, the average was taken. ESPN grades are on a 100-point scale.; Sources: "2024 Syracuse Signees". Rivals.; "2024 Syracuse Signees". Scout.; "2024 Syracuse Signees". ESPN.; "Scout.com Team Recruiting Rankings". Scout.; "2024 Team Ranking". Rivals.

== Preseason ==
On October 15, 2024, the ACC released the preseason coaches poll. Syracuse was picked to finish 11th in the ACC regular season, its lowest ranking in the poll since joining the conference in 2013.

=== Preseason rankings ===
ACC preseason poll
Predicted finish	Team	Votes (1st place)
1	Duke	956 (42)
2	North Carolina	924 (11)
3	Wake Forest	800 (1)
4	Clemson	765
5	Virginia	743
6	Miami (FL)	659
7	Pittsburgh	636
8	NC State	550
9	Louisville	518
10	Notre Dame	462
11	Syracuse	454
12	Georgia Tech	433
13	SMU	344
14	Virginia Tech	252
15	Florida State	251
16	California	206
17	Stanford	165
18	Boston College	116

=== Preseason All-ACC ===
No Orange players were named to the first or second Preseason All-ACC teams.

== Roster ==
2024–25 Syracuse Orange men's basketball team
Players
Coaches

Pos.	#	Name	Height	Weight	Year	Previous school	Hometown
G	0	Kyle Cuffe Jr.	6 ft 2 in (1.88 m)	190 lb (86 kg)	RS Jr	Blair Academy; Kansas	Harlem, New York
F	1	Donavan Freeman	6 ft 7 in (2.01 m)	190 lb (86 kg)	Fr	IMG Academy	Washington, D.C.
G	2	JJ Starling	6 ft 4 in (1.93 m)	206 lb (93 kg)	Jr	La Lumiere; Notre Dame	Baldwinsville, New York
G	3	Lucas Taylor	6 ft 5 in (1.96 m)	195 lb (88 kg)	Sr	Heritage; Georgia State	Wake Forest, North Carolina
F	4	Chris Bell	6 ft 7 in (2.01 m)	188 lb (85 kg)	Jr	Wasatch Academy	Concord, California
G	5	Jaquan Carlos	6 ft 0 in (1.83 m)	170 lb (77 kg)	Sr	Thomas Jefferson High School; Hofstra	Brooklyn, New York
F	6	Petar Majstorovic	6 ft 8 in (2.03 m)	215 lb (98 kg)	Fr	ASA; ASVEL Basket	Haguenau, France
G	8	Elijah Moore	6 ft 4 in (1.93 m)	176 lb (80 kg)	Fr	NY High School	Bronx, New York
C	10	Naheem McLeod	7 ft 4 in (2.24 m)	255 lb (116 kg)	Sr	Plymouth-Whitemarsh; Florida State	Philadelphia, Pennsylvania
G	11	Chance Westry	6 ft 6 in (1.98 m)	190 lb (86 kg)	Jr	AZ Compass Prep School (AZ); Auburn	Harrisburg, Pennsylvania
G	12	Anthony Clayton (W)	6 ft 0 in (1.83 m)	180 lb (82 kg)	Sr	Avon Old Farms	Albany, New York
F	13	Jyáre Davis	6 ft 7 in (2.01 m)	215 lb (98 kg)	GS	Providence; Delaware	Newark, Delaware
G	24	Noah Lobdell	6 ft 0 in (1.83 m)	140 lb (64 kg)	Fr	Faith Heritage	Syracuse, New York
F	30	Chaz Owens	6 ft 5 in (1.96 m)	205 lb (93 kg)	GS	Shipley; Ranger	Blue Bell, Pennsylvania
G	34	Chris Gatty (W)	6 ft 2 in (1.88 m)	175 lb (79 kg)	So	The Masters School	Katonah, New York
C	44	Eddie Lampkin Jr.	6 ft 11 in (2.11 m)	265 lb (120 kg)	GS	Morton Ranch HS; Colorado	Houston, Texas
G	51	Nate Fleisher	6 ft 1 in (1.85 m)	150 lb (68 kg)	Sr	Highland Park	Highland Park, Illinois

Head coach

- Adrian Autry, 2nd yr. (Syracuse, 1994)

Assistant coach(es)

- Dan Engelstad, 1st yr. (St. Mary's (MD), 2007)
- Allen Griffin, 8th yr. (Syracuse, 2001)
- Brenden Straughn, 2nd yr. (Hood, 2012)

Legend

- (C) Team captain
- (S) Suspended
- (I) Ineligible
- (W) Walk-on
- Injured
- Current redshirt

Roster
Last update: October 29, 2024

== Schedule and results ==
Date time, TV	Rank^{#}	Opponent^{#}	Result	Record	High points	High rebounds	High assists	Site (attendance) city, state
Exhibition
October 26, 2024*; 1:00 p.m., ACCNX		Clarion	W 101–73	–	17 – Starling	7 – Tied	10 – Carlos	JMA Wireless Dome; Syracuse, NY
October 30, 2024*; 7:00 p.m.		Slippery Rock	W 96–51	–	17 – Bell	7 – Tied	6 – Carlos	JMA Wireless Dome (2,693); Syracuse, NY
Regular Season
November 4, 2024*; 7:00 p.m., ACCNX/ESPN+		Le Moyne	W 86–82	1–0	22 – Davis	12 – Davis	6 – Carlos	JMA Wireless Dome (19,619); Syracuse, NY
November 12, 2024*; 7:00 p.m., ACCNX/ESPN+		Colgate	W 74–72	2–0	15 – Lampkin Jr.	12 – Lampkin Jr.	5 – Tied	JMA Wireless Dome (19,267); Syracuse, NY
November 16, 2024*; 2:00 p.m., ACCNX/ESPN+		Youngstown State	W 104–95 ^{2OT}	3–0	38 – Starling	13 – Lampkin Jr.	7 – Lampkin Jr.	JMA Wireless Dome (19,610); Syracuse, NY
November 21, 2024*; 7:00 p.m., ESPN2		vs. Texas; Legends Classic semifinals	L 66–70	3–1	14 – Lampkin Jr.	7 – Davis	6 – Lampkin Jr.	Barclays Center (6,941); Brooklyn, NY
November 22, 2024*; 7:00 p.m., ESPNU		vs. Texas Tech; Legends Classic 3rd place game	L 74–79	3–2	27 – Starling	13 – Freeman	3 – Carlos	Barclays Center (6,572); Brooklyn, NY
November 27, 2024*; 7:00 p.m., ACCNX/ESPN+		Cornell	W 82–72	4–2	23 – Freeman	12 – Freeman	3 – Tied	JMA Wireless Dome (14,318); Syracuse, NY
December 3, 2024*; 7:30 p.m., ESPN		at No. 3 Tennessee; ACC–SEC Challenge	L 70–96	4–3	24 – Moore	5 – Tied	4 – Carlos	Thompson–Boling Arena (21,678); Knoxville, TN
December 7, 2024; 12:00 p.m., The CW		at Notre Dame	L 64–69	4–4 (0–1)	20 – Tied	11 – Freeman	7 – Carlos	Joyce Center (6,280); South Bend, IN
December 10, 2024*; 7:00 p.m., ESPN2		Albany	W 102–85	5–4	24 – Freeman	8 – Tied	12 – Carlos	JMA Wireless Dome (19,354); Syracuse, NY
December 14, 2024*; 2:30 p.m., ACCN		Georgetown; Rivalry	L 71–75	5–5	18 – Lampkin Jr.	6 – Davis	5 – Carlos	JMA Wireless Dome (17,187); Syracuse, NY
December 21, 2024*; 12:00 p.m., ESPN		vs. Maryland; Gotham Classic	L 60–87	5–6	16 – Moore	10 – Lampkin Jr.	4 – Tied	Barclays Center (8,022); Brooklyn, NY
December 28, 2024*; 2:00 p.m., The CW		Bucknell	W 75–63	6–6	18 – Lampkin	11 – Tied	9 – Carlos	JMA Wireless Dome (15,987); Syracuse, NY
December 31, 2024; 2:00 p.m., ESPN2		Wake Forest	L 71–81	6–7 (0–2)	16 – Tied	10 – Lampkin	4 – Carlos	JMA Wireless Dome (14,437); Syracuse, NY
January 4, 2025; 6:00 p.m., ACCN		at Florida State	L 74–90	6–8 (0–3)	18 – Bell	10 – Freeman	3 – Tied	Donald L. Tucker Center (4,941); Tallahassee, FL
January 7, 2025; 7:00 p.m., ACCN		Georgia Tech	W 62–55	7–8 (1–3)	21 – Starling	12 – Lampkin	4 – Davis	JMA Wireless Dome (13,935); Syracuse, NY
January 11, 2025; 3:00 p.m., The CW		at Boston College	W 79–71	8–8 (2–3)	26 – Starling	13 – Lampkin Jr.	3 – Tied	Conte Forum (6,287); Chestnut Hill, MA
January 14, 2025; 7:00 p.m., ACCN		Louisville	L 61–85	8–9 (2–4)	18 – Bell	10 – Lampkin	4 – Starling	JMA Wireless Dome (19,750); Syracuse, NY
January 18, 2025; 4:00 p.m., ACCN		Notre Dame	W 77–69	9–9 (3–4)	21 – Starling	11 – Lampkin	4 – Lampkin	JMA Wireless Dome (20,842); Syracuse, NY
January 22, 2025; 7:00 p.m., ACCN		at Clemson	L 72–86	9–10 (3–5)	25 – Starling	9 – Lampkin	3 – Tied}	Littlejohn Coliseum (9,000); Clemson, SC
January 25, 2025; 12:30 p.m., ESPN2		Pittsburgh	L 73–77	9–11 (3–6)	16 – Starling	23 – Lampkin	5 – Starling	JMA Wireless Dome (20,585); Syracuse, NY
January 29, 2025; 11:00 p.m., ESPNU		at Stanford	L 61–70	9–12 (3–7)	16 – Carlos	7 – Lampkin	3 – Carlos	Maples Pavilion (3,220); Stanford, CA
February 1, 2025; 10:00 p.m., ESPN2		at California	W 75–66	10–12 (4–7)	19 – Taylor	10 – Lampkin Jr.	4 – Starling	Haas Pavilion (5,203); Berkeley, CA
February 5, 2025; 7:00 p.m., ESPN2		No. 2 Duke	L 54–83	10–13 (4–8)	12 – Tied	7 – Lampkin Jr.	2 – Tied	JMA Wireless Dome (23,313); Syracuse, NY
February 8, 2025; 3:15 p.m., The CW		Boston College	W 95–86 ^{3OT}	11–13 (5–8)	28 – Starling	18 – Lampkin	3 – Lampkin	JMA Wireless Dome (20,881); Syracuse, NY
February 11, 2025; 7:00 p.m., ACCN		at Miami (FL)	L 84–91	11–14 (5–9)	25 – Starling	13 – Lampkin	6 – Lampkin	Watsco Center (5,752); Coral Gables, FL
February 15, 2025; 6:00 p.m., ESPN		North Carolina	L 82–88	11–15 (5–10)	26 – Lampkin	11 – Lampkin	7 – Carlos	JMA Wireless Dome (22,340); Syracuse, NY
February 18, 2025; 7:00 p.m., ACCN		at Pittsburgh	L 69–80	11–16 (5–11)	23 – Bell	6 – Tied	6 – Carlos	Petersen Events Center (7,260); Pittsburgh, PA
February 26, 2025; 7:00 p.m., ESPNU		NC State	W 74–60	12–16 (6–11)	17 – Starling	15 – Lampkin	4 – Starling	JMA Wireless Dome (19,404); Syracuse, NY
March 1, 2025; 12:00 p.m., The CW		at Virginia Tech	L 95–101 ^{OT}	12–17 (6–12)	21 – Davis	12 – Lampkin	9 – Carlos	Cassell Coliseum (8,925); Blacksburg, VA
March 4, 2025; 9:00 p.m., ESPNU		at SMU	L 75–77	12–18 (6–13)	13 – Taylor	9 – Lampkin	8 – Carlos	Moody Coliseum (5,804); Dallas, TX
March 8, 2025; 8:00 p.m., ACCN		Virginia	W 84–70	13–18 (7–13)	25 – Lampkin Jr.	10 – Lampkin Jr.	7 – Carlos	JMA Wireless Dome (20,274); Syracuse, NY
ACC Tournament
March 11, 2025; 7:00 p.m., ACCN	(14)	vs. (11) Florida State; First round	W 66–62	14–18	27 – Starling	9 – Lampkin Jr.	2 – Tied	Spectrum Center (5,136); Charlotte, NC
March 12, 2025; 9:30 p.m., ESPNU	(14)	vs. (6) SMU; Second round	L 53–73	14–19	16 – Starling	10 – Lampkin Jr.	5 – Carlos	Spectrum Center (6,620); Charlotte, NC
*Non-conference game. ^{#}Rankings from AP poll. (#) Tournament seedings in parentheses. All times are in Eastern Time.
