= 2024–25 Pittsburgh Panthers men's basketball team =

American college basketball season

2024–25 Pittsburgh Panthers men's basketball
- Conference: Atlantic Coast Conference
- Record: 17–15 (8–12 ACC)
- Head coach: Jeff Capel (7th season)
- Associate head coach: Tim O'Toole (7th season)
- Assistant coaches: Milan Brown (7th season); Jason Capel (7th season); Kyle Cieplicki; Gilbert Brown
- Home arena: Petersen Events Center (Capacity: 12,508)

2024–25 ACC men's basketball standings
	Conf.				Overall
Team	W		L	PCT	W		L	PCT
No. 3 Duke †	19	–	1	.950	35	–	4	.897
No. 21 Louisville	18	–	2	.900	27	–	8	.771
No. 22 Clemson	18	–	2	.900	27	–	7	.794
Wake Forest	13	–	7	.650	21	–	11	.656
North Carolina	13	–	7	.650	23	–	14	.622
SMU	13	–	7	.650	24	–	11	.686
Stanford	11	–	9	.550	21	–	14	.600
Georgia Tech	10	–	10	.500	17	–	17	.500
Virginia	8	–	12	.400	15	–	17	.469
Virginia Tech	8	–	12	.400	13	–	19	.406
Florida State	8	–	12	.400	17	–	15	.531
Notre Dame	8	–	12	.400	15	–	18	.455
Pittsburgh	8	–	12	.400	17	–	15	.531
Syracuse	7	–	13	.350	14	–	19	.424
California	6	–	14	.300	14	–	19	.424
NC State	5	–	15	.250	12	–	19	.387
Boston College	4	–	16	.200	12	–	19	.387
Miami (FL)	3	–	17	.150	7	–	24	.226
† 2025 ACC tournament winner Rankings from AP poll

The 2024–25 Pittsburgh Panthers men's basketball team represented the University of Pittsburgh during the 2024–25 NCAA Division I men's basketball season. The Panthers were led by seventh-year head coach Jeff Capel and played their home games at the Petersen Events Center in Pittsburgh, Pennsylvania as members of the Atlantic Coast Conference.

The Panthers started the season well, winning four straight games before their Thanksgiving tournament. The highlight of that run was a 86–62 rivalry victory over West Virginia. They then traveled to West Virginia to participate in the Greenbrier Tip-Off. They defeated LSU 74–63 in the semifinal but lost to nineteenth-ranked Wisconsin 81–75 in the final to finish in second place. After their 91–90 overtime road defeat of Ohio State, the Panthers were ranked eighteenth in the AP poll. After becoming ranked, they lost to Mississippi State 90–57 in the ACC–SEC Challenge and defeated Virginia Tech in their ACC opener. These results cased them to fall out of the rankings. The Panthers then won two straight non-conference games, and defeated ACC newcomers California and Stanford in Pittsburgh. The team then went on a four-game losing streak. The streak included a 76–47 blowout loss to fourth-ranked Duke, a close 82–78 loss to Louisville, and a 78–75 overtime loss to Clemson. The Panthers rebounded with a four-point win over Syracuse and a 73–65 win over North Carolina. They went on another four-game losing streak after that, which included a one-point loss in a rematch against North Carolina and a two-point loss to Wake Forest. The Panthers finished the regular season 3–4, winning two games after their four-game losing streak and winning the final game of the season against Boston College. Between those wins was another four-game losing streak, which included a four-point loss to Notre Dame and a loss to nineteenth-ranked Louisville.

The Panthers finished the season 17–15 and 8–12 in ACC play to finish in a five-way tie for ninth place. Pittsburgh finished last in the tiebreaking procedure and was the thirteenth seed in the 2025 ACC tournament. They faced twelve-seed Notre Dame in the First Round, a rematch of a game played just seventeen games earlier. The Panthers lost a low scoring affair 55–54. They were not invited to the NCAA tournament and declined an invitation to the NIT.

== Previous season ==
The Panthers finished the 2023–24 season 22–11 and 12–8 in ACC play to finish in a fourth place. As the fourth seed in the ACC tournament, they received a bye into the quarterfinals where they defeated Wake Forest. They faced North Carolina in the semifinals where they were defeated 65–72. They were not invited to the NCAA tournament and they were eligible to participate in the NIT Tournament, but they opted not to participate.

== Offseason ==
=== Departures ===
Departures
Name	Number	Pos.	Height	Weight	Year	Hometown	Reason for departure
Blake Hinson	2	F	6'8"	230	Senior	Deltona, Florida	Graduated
Bub Carrington	7	G	6'5"	190	Freshman	Baltimore, Maryland	Drafted 14th overall in the 2024 NBA draft
KJ Marshall	12	G	5'10"	175	Senior	Reading, Pennsylvania	Graduated
William Jeffress	24	F	6'7"	210	(redshirt) Junior	Erie, Pennsylvania	Transferred to Louisiana Tech
Federiko Federiko	33	C	6'11"	225	Junior	Helsinki, Finland	Transferred to Texas Tech

=== Incoming transfers ===
Incoming transfers
Name	Number	Pos.	Height	Weight	Year	Hometown	Previous school
Damian Dunn	1	G	6'5"	205	Graduate Student	Kinston, North Carolina	Houston
Cameron Corhen	2	F	6'10"	235	Junior	Allen, Texas	Florida State

=== Recruiting class ===
College recruiting information
Name	Hometown	School	Height	Weight	Commit date
Brandin Cummings #30 SG	Midland, PA	Lincoln Park High School	6 ft 2 in (1.88 m)	170 lb (77 kg)	Jan 4, 2023
Brandin Cummings #30 SG	Recruit ratings: Rivals: 247Sports: ESPN: (81)				
Amsal Delalić; G	Bosnia and Herzegovina	Borac Nektar	6 ft 8 in (2.03 m)	210 lb (95 kg)	May 18, 2024
Amsal Delalić; G	Recruit ratings: Rivals: 247Sports: ESPN: (NR)				
Liam Mignogna; C	Gibsonia, Pennsylvania	Hampton	6 ft 9 in (2.06 m)	250 lb (110 kg)	
Liam Mignogna; C	Recruit ratings: Rivals: 247Sports: ESPN: (NR)				
Amdy Ndiaye; F	Dakar, Senegal	Putnam Science Academy	6 ft 10 in (2.08 m)	210 lb (95 kg)	Nov 3, 2023
Amdy Ndiaye; F	Recruit ratings: Rivals: 247Sports: ESPN: (NR)				
Overall recruit ranking: Scout: 78 Rivals: 69
Note: In many cases, Scout, Rivals, 247Sports, On3, and ESPN may conflict in their listings of height and weight.; In these cases, the average was taken. ESPN grades are on a 100-point scale.; Sources: "Pittsburgh 2024 Basketball Commitments". Rivals.; "Pittsburgh Panthers". ESPN.; "2024 Team Ranking". Rivals.

== Roster ==
2024–25 Pittsburgh Panthers men's basketball team
Players
Coaches

Pos.	#	Name	Height	Weight	Year	Previous school	Hometown
F	0	Amdy Ndiaye	6 ft 10 in (2.08 m)	210 lb (95 kg)	Fr	Putnam Science Academy	Dakar, Senegal
G	1	Damian Dunn	6 ft 5 in (1.96 m)	205 lb (93 kg)	GS	Meadowcreek; Houston	Kinston, NC
F	2	Cameron Corhen	6 ft 10 in (2.08 m)	235 lb (107 kg)	Jr	Sunrise Christian Academy; Florida State	Allen, TX
G	3	Brandin Cummings	6 ft 3 in (1.91 m)	175 lb (79 kg)	Fr	Lincoln Park	Midland, PA
F	4	Papa Amadou Kante	6 ft 10 in (2.08 m)	235 lb (107 kg)	RS Fr	South Kent Prep	Dakar, Senegal
G	5	Ishmael Leggett	6 ft 3 in (1.91 m)	185 lb (84 kg)	Sr	St. John's College; Rhode Island	Washington, D.C.
F	11	Marlon Barnes Jr.	6 ft 6 in (1.98 m)	190 lb (86 kg)	RS Fr	Brush	Cleveland, OH
G	13	Benjamin Mayhew (W)	6 ft 4 in (1.93 m)	180 lb (82 kg)	So	Propel Braddock Hills	Wilkinsburg, PA
G	15	Jaland Lowe	6 ft 3 in (1.91 m)	175 lb (79 kg)	So	Fort Bend Marshall	Missouri City, TX
G	21	Vason Stevenson (W)	6 ft 3 in (1.91 m)	190 lb (86 kg)	Jr	Montour	McKees Rocks, PA
C	24	Liam Mignogna	6 ft 9 in (2.06 m)	250 lb (113 kg)	Fr	Hampton	Gibsonia, PA
F	25	Guillermo Díaz Graham	7 ft 0 in (2.13 m)	225 lb (102 kg)	Jr	IMG Academy	Canary Islands, Spain
F	31	Jorge Díaz Graham	6 ft 11 in (2.11 m)	215 lb (98 kg)	Jr	IMG Academy	Canary Islands, Spain
F	44	Jajuan Nelson (W)	6 ft 7 in (2.01 m)	215 lb (98 kg)	So	String Theory Charter (PA)	Philadelphia, PA
G	52	Amsal Delalić	6 ft 8 in (2.03 m)	210 lb (95 kg)	Fr	Borac Nektar	Tuzla, Bosnia and Herzegovina
F	55	Zack Austin	6 ft 6 in (1.98 m)	205 lb (93 kg)	RS Sr	Moravian Prep; High Point	Winston-Salem, NC

Head coach

- Jeff Capel (Duke)

Assistant coach(es)

- Tim O'Toole (Fairfield)
- Milan Brown (Howard)
- Jason Capel (North Carolina)
- Kyle Cieplicki (Vermont)
- Gilbert Brown (Pittsburgh)

Legend

- (C) Team captain
- (S) Suspended
- (I) Ineligible
- (W) Walk-on
- Injured
- Current redshirt

Roster
Last update: August 8, 2024

== Schedule and results ==
Date time, TV	Rank^{#}	Opponent^{#}	Result	Record	High points	High rebounds	High assists	Site (attendance) city, state
Exhibition
October 22, 2024*; 7:00 p.m.		Point Park	W 93–62	–	24 – Leggett	11 – Corhen	5 – Leggett	Petersen Events Center (5,427); Pittsburgh, PA
Regular season
November 4, 2024*; 7:00 p.m., ACCNX/ESPN+		Radford	W 96–56	1–0	21 – Lowe	12 – Leggett	6 – Lowe	Petersen Events Center (6,579); Pittsburgh, PA
November 8, 2024*; 7:00 p.m., ACCNX/ESPN+		Murray State	W 83–68	2–0	20 – Lowe	10 – Corhen	3 – Lowe	Petersen Events Center (7,537); Pittsburgh, PA
November 11, 2024*; 7:00 p.m., ACCNX/ESPN+		Gardner–Webb	W 83–64	3–0	21 – Leggett	9 – G. Diaz Graham	5 – Tied	Petersen Events Center (6,229); Pittsburgh, PA
November 15, 2024*; 8:00 p.m., ACCNX/ESPN+		West Virginia; Backyard Brawl	W 86–62	4–0	23 – Dunn	10 – G. Diaz Graham	5 – Lowe	Petersen Events Center (10,882); Pittsburgh, PA
November 18, 2024*; 7:00 p.m., ACCNX/ESPN+		VMI; Greenbrier Tip-Off campus game	W 93–48	5–0	14 – Leggett	10 – Lowe	10 – Lowe	Petersen Events Center (6,391); Pittsburgh, PA
November 22, 2024*; 2:30 p.m., CBSSN		vs. LSU; Greenbrier Tip-Off Mountain Division semifinals	W 74–63	6–0	22 – Lowe	8 – Lowe	6 – Lowe	Colonial Hall (1,112); White Sulphur Springs, WV
November 24, 2024*; 5:30 p.m., CBSSN		vs. No. 19 Wisconsin; Greenbrier Tip-Off Mountain Division championships	L 75–81	6–1	17 – Leggett	8 – Leggett	5 – Lowe	Colonial Hall (1,112); White Sulphur Springs, WV
November 29, 2024*; 2:30 p.m., Peacock		at Ohio State	W 91–90 ^{OT}	7–1	28 – Lowe	10 – Leggett	4 – Tied	Value City Arena (13,064); Columbus, OH
December 4, 2024*; 9:15 p.m., SECN	No. 18	at Mississippi State; ACC–SEC Challenge	L 57–90	7–2	19 – Lowe	6 – Delalic	3 – Lowe	Humphrey Coliseum (9,492); Mississippi State, MS
December 7, 2024; 2:00 p.m., ESPNU	No. 18	at Virginia Tech	W 64–59	8–2 (1–0)	19 – Lowe	7 – G. Diaz Graham	4 – Leggett	Cassell Coliseum (8,925); Blacksburg, VA
December 11, 2024*; 7:00 p.m., ACCNX/ESPN+		Eastern Kentucky	W 96–56	9–2	30 – Cummings	6 – Tied	12 – Lowe	Petersen Events Center (5,948); Pittsburgh, PA
December 21, 2024*; 1:00 p.m., ACCNX/ESPN+		Sam Houston	W 110–78	10–2	23 – Tied	6 – Corhen	11 – Lowe	Petersen Events Center (7,146); Pittsburgh, PA
January 1, 2025; 2:00 p.m., ACCN		California	W 86–74	11–2 (2–0)	27 – Lowe	11 – Corhen	8 – Lowe	Petersen Events Center (7,177); Pittsburgh, PA
January 4, 2025; 6:30 p.m., ESPN2		Stanford	W 83–68	12–2 (3–0)	21 – Leggett	6 – Tied	5 – Lowe	Petersen Events Center (8,087); Pittsburgh, PA
January 7, 2025; 7:00 p.m., ESPN		at No. 4 Duke	L 47–76	12–3 (3–1)	11 – Corhen	7 – Corhen	4 – Lowe	Cameron Indoor Stadium (9,314); Durham, NC
January 11, 2025; 12:00 p.m., ESPN2		Louisville	L 78–82	12–4 (3–2)	24 – Lowe	8 – Dunn	6 – Lowe	Petersen Events Center (9,065); Pittsburgh, PA
January 15, 2025; 9:00 p.m., ESPNU		at Florida State	L 70–82	12–5 (3–3)	22 – Lowe	9 – Corhen	5 – Lowe	Donald L. Tucker Center (5,784); Tallahassee, FL
January 18, 2025; 12:00 p.m., The CW		Clemson	L 75–78 ^{OT}	12–6 (3–4)	18 – Leggett	7 – Austin	5 – Diaz Graham	Petersen Events Center (10,584); Pittsburgh, PA
January 25, 2025; 12:30 p.m., ESPN2		at Syracuse	W 77–73	13–6 (4–4)	22 – Lowe	7 – Corhen	6 – Lowe	JMA Wireless Dome (20,585); Syracuse, NY
January 28, 2025; 9:00 p.m., ESPN		North Carolina	W 73–65	14–6 (5–4)	18 – Lowe	6 – Tied	7 – Lowe	Petersen Events Center (11,277); Pittsburgh, PA
February 1, 2025; 12:00 p.m., ESPN2		at Wake Forest	L 74–76	14–7 (5–5)	24 – Dunn	7 – Leggett	4 – Tied	LJVM Coliseum (10.787); Winston-Salem, NC
February 3, 2025; 7:00 p.m., ESPN		Virginia	L 57–73	14–8 (5–6)	17 – Leggett	6 – Leggett	4 – Lowe	Petersen Events Center (9,075); Pittsburgh, PA
February 8, 2025; 4:00 p.m., ESPNU		at North Carolina	L 66–67	14–9 (5–7)	17 – Corhen	6 – Tied	5 – Dunn	Dean Smith Center (21,750); Chapel Hill, NC
February 11, 2025; 9:00 p.m., ACCN		at SMU	L 63–83	14–10 (5–8)	15 – Diaz Graham	8 – Diaz Graham	5 – Lowe	Moody Coliseum (5,525); Dallas, TX
February 15, 2025; 12:00 p.m., ESPN2		Miami (FL)	W 74–65	15–10 (6–8)	21 – Leggett	10 – Tied	5 – Leggett	Petersen Events Center (8,578); Pittsburgh, PA
February 18, 2025; 7:00 p.m., ACCN		Syracuse	W 80–69	16–10 (7–8)	19 – Tied	8 – Diaz Graham	3 – Tied	Petersen Events Center (7,260); Pittsburgh, PA
February 22, 2025; 2:15 p.m., The CW		at Notre Dame	L 72–76	16–11 (7–9)	21 – Leggett	7 – Corhen	4 – Lowe	Joyce Center (6,489); South Bend, IN
February 25, 2025; 7:00 p.m., ACCN		Georgia Tech	L 67–73	16–12 (7–10)	25 – Lowe	6 – Austin	8 – Lowe	Petersen Events Center (6,355); Pittsburgh, PA
March 1, 2025; 6:00 p.m., ESPN2		at No. 19 Louisville	L 68–79	16–13 (7–11)	16 – Lowe	10 – Lowe	5 – Lowe	KFC Yum! Center (18,459); Louisville, KY
March 5, 2025; 7:00 p.m., ESPNews		at NC State	L 63–71	16–14 (7–12)	20 – Lowe	7 – Lowe	7 – Lowe	Lenovo Center (11,538); Raleigh, NC
March 8, 2025; 6:00 p.m., ACCN		Boston College	W 93–67	17–14 (8–12)	16 – Tied	8 – Leggett	10 – Lowe	Petersen Events Center (7,884); Pittsburgh, PA
ACC Tournament
March 11, 2025; 2:00 p.m., ACCN	(13)	vs. (12) Notre Dame; First round	L 54–55	17–15	17 – Lowe	7 – Leggett	4 – Lowe	Spectrum Center (5,136); Charlotte, NC
*Non-conference game. ^{#}Rankings from AP Poll. (#) Tournament seedings in parentheses. All times are in Eastern Time.

== Rankings ==
Ranking movements Legend: ██ Increase in ranking ██ Decrease in ranking — = Not ranked RV = Received votes
	Week																				
Poll	Pre	1	2	3	4	5	6	7	8	9	10	11	12	13	14	15	16	17	18	19	Final
AP	—	—	RV	RV	18	RV	RV	RV	RV	RV	—	—	—	—	—	—	—	—	—	—	—
Coaches	—	—	RV	25	19	RV	RV	RV	RV	RV	—	—	—	—	—	—	—	—	—	—	—
