= 2025 ACC men's basketball tournament =

American college basketball competition

- 2025 ACC Tournament logo
- Classification: Division I
- Season: 2024–25
- Teams: 15
- Site: Spectrum Center; Charlotte, North Carolina
- Champions: Duke (23rd title)
- Winning coach: Jon Scheyer (2nd title)
- MVP: Kon Knueppel (Duke)
- Attendance: 79,659
- Television: ESPN, ESPN2, ESPNU, ACCN

2024–25 ACC men's basketball standings
| | Conf. | | | | Overall |
| Team | W | | L | PCT | W | | L | PCT |
|---|---|---|---|---|---|---|---|---|
| No. 3 Duke † | 19 | – | 1 | .950 | 35 | – | 4 | .897 |
| No. 21 Louisville | 18 | – | 2 | .900 | 27 | – | 8 | .771 |
| No. 22 Clemson | 18 | – | 2 | .900 | 27 | – | 7 | .794 |
| Wake Forest | 13 | – | 7 | .650 | 21 | – | 11 | .656 |
| North Carolina | 13 | – | 7 | .650 | 23 | – | 14 | .622 |
| SMU | 13 | – | 7 | .650 | 24 | – | 11 | .686 |
| Stanford | 11 | – | 9 | .550 | 21 | – | 14 | .600 |
| Georgia Tech | 10 | – | 10 | .500 | 17 | – | 17 | .500 |
| Virginia | 8 | – | 12 | .400 | 15 | – | 17 | .469 |
| Virginia Tech | 8 | – | 12 | .400 | 13 | – | 19 | .406 |
| Florida State | 8 | – | 12 | .400 | 17 | – | 15 | .531 |
| Notre Dame | 8 | – | 12 | .400 | 15 | – | 18 | .455 |
| Pittsburgh | 8 | – | 12 | .400 | 17 | – | 15 | .531 |
| Syracuse | 7 | – | 13 | .350 | 14 | – | 19 | .424 |
| California | 6 | – | 14 | .300 | 14 | – | 19 | .424 |
| NC State | 5 | – | 15 | .250 | 12 | – | 19 | .387 |
| Boston College | 4 | – | 16 | .200 | 12 | – | 19 | .387 |
| Miami (FL) | 3 | – | 17 | .150 | 7 | – | 24 | .226 |
† 2025 ACC tournament winner Rankings from AP poll

The 2025 ACC men's basketball tournament was the postseason men's basketball tournament for the Atlantic Coast Conference held at the Spectrum Center in Charlotte, North Carolina, from March 11–15, 2025. It was the seventy-second edition of the tournament, and fourteenth edition held in Charlotte. The tournament was sponsored by T. Rowe Price.

Only the top 15 schools were invited to participate in the tournament. This was the first ACC men's basketball tournament in which all ACC teams were not invited to the tournament (barring suspensions). The NC State Wolfpack were the defending tournament champions, but failed to qualify for this year's tournament. First seed Duke went on to win the tournament, defeating second seed Louisville in the championship game. The title was the twenty-third overall for the Duke men's basketball program, and second in the last three years. As tournament champions, Duke received the conference's automatic bid to the 2025 NCAA Division I men's basketball tournament.

== Seeding and qualification ==
Fifteen of the eighteen ACC men's basketball teams participated in the tournament. Teams were seeded by record within the conference, with a tiebreaker system to seed teams with identical conference records. If three or more teams finished the season tied, the combined record in conference games between the tied teams involved would be compiled. Ties were broken and seeds assigned based on the winning percentage of the combined conference records. The higher winning percentage prevailed, even if the number of games played against the team or group was unequal. The second tiebreaker was record against the team occupying the highest position in the standings and then continuing down the standings until one team gained an advantage.

| Seed | School | Conference record | Tiebreaker 1 | Tiebreaker 2 |
|---|---|---|---|---|
| 1 | Duke | 19–1 | | |
| 2 | Louisville | 18–2 | 1–0 vs. Clemson | |
| 3 | Clemson | 18–2 | 0–1 vs. Louisville | |
| 4 | Wake Forest | 13–7 | 2–0 vs. UNC/SMU | |
| 5 | North Carolina | 13–7 | 1–1 vs. WF/SMU | |
| 6 | SMU | 13–7 | 0–2 vs. WF/UNC | |
| 7 | Stanford | 11–9 | | |
| 8 | Georgia Tech | 10–10 | | |
| 9 | Virginia | 8–12 | 3–2 vs. VT/FSU/ND/Pitt | 2–1 vs. UNC/SMU/WAKE |
| 10 | Virginia Tech | 8–12 | 3–2 vs. UVA/FSU/ND/Pitt | 0–3 vs. UNC/SMU/WAKE |
| 11 | Florida State | 8–12 | 2–2 vs. UVA/VT/ND/Pitt | 2–1 vs. UNC/SMU/WAKE |
| 12 | Notre Dame | 8–12 | 2–2 vs. UVA/VT/FSU/Pitt | 0–3 vs. UNC/SMU/WAKE |
| 13 | Pittsburgh | 8–12 | 1–3 vs. UVA/VT/FSU/ND | |
| 14 | Syracuse | 7–13 | | |
| 15 | California | 6–14 | | |
| DNQ | NC State | 5–15 | | |
| DNQ | Boston College | 4–16 | | |
| DNQ | Miami (FL) | 3–17 | | |

== Schedule ==
| Session | Game | Time | Matchup | Score | Television | Attendance |
First round – Tuesday, March 11
| Opening day | 1 | 2:00 p.m. | No. 12 Notre Dame vs. No. 13 Pittsburgh | 55–54 | ACCN | 5,136 |
| Opening day | 2 | 4:30 p.m. | No. 10 Virginia Tech vs. No. 15 California | 73–82 ^{2OT} | ACCN | 5,136 |
| Opening day | 3 | 7:45 p.m. | No. 11 Florida State vs. No. 14 Syracuse | 62–66 | ACCN | 5,136 |
Second round – Wednesday, March 12
| 1 | 4 | 12:00 p.m. | No. 8 Georgia Tech vs. No. 9 Virginia | 66–60 | ESPN2 | 9,722 |
| 1 | 5 | 2:30 p.m. | No. 5 North Carolina vs. No. 12 Notre Dame | 76–56 | ESPN | 9,722 |
| 2 | 6 | 7:00 p.m. | No. 7 Stanford vs. No. 15 California | 78–73 | ESPN2 | 6,620 |
| 2 | 7 | 9:30 p.m. | No. 6 SMU vs. No. 14 Syracuse | 73–53 | ESPNU | 6,620 |
Quarterfinals – Thursday, March 13
| 3 | 8 | 12:00 p.m. | No. 1 Duke vs. No. 8 Georgia Tech | 78–70 | ESPN | 14,116 |
| 3 | 9 | 2:30 p.m. | No. 4 Wake Forest vs. No. 5 North Carolina | 59–68 | ESPN | 14,116 |
| 4 | 10 | 7:00 p.m. | No. 2 Louisville vs. No. 7 Stanford | 75–73 | ESPN2 | 10,627 |
| 4 | 11 | 9:30 p.m. | No. 3 Clemson vs. No. 6 SMU | 57–54 | ESPN2 | 10,627 |
Semifinals – Friday, March 14
| 5 | 12 | 7:00 p.m. | No. 1 Duke vs. No. 5 North Carolina | 74–71 | ESPN | 18,116 |
| 5 | 13 | 9:30 p.m. | No. 2 Louisville vs. No. 3 Clemson | 76–73 | ESPN | 18,116 |
Championship – Saturday, March 15
| 6 | 14 | 8:30 p.m. | No. 1 Duke vs. No. 2 Louisville | 73–62 | ESPN | 15,322 |
Game times in EDT. Rankings denote tournament seed.

== Bracket ==
First round Tuesday, March 11
12 | Notre Dame | 55
13 | Pittsburgh | 54
10 | Virginia Tech | 73
15 | California | 82^{2OT}
11 | Florida State | 62
14 | Syracuse | 66

Second round Wednesday, March 12
8 | Georgia Tech | 66
9 | Virginia | 60
5 | North Carolina | 76
12 | Notre Dame | 56
7 | Stanford | 78
15 | California | 73
6 | SMU | 73
14 | Syracuse | 53

Quarterfinals; Thursday, March 13
1 | 1 Duke | 78
8 | Georgia Tech | 70
4 | Wake Forest | 59
5 | North Carolina | 68
2 | 13 Louisville | 75
7 | Stanford | 73
3 | 10 Clemson | 57
6 | SMU | 54

Semifinals; Friday, March 14
1 | 1 Duke | 74
5 | North Carolina | 71
2 | 13 Louisville | 76
3 | 10 Clemson | 73

Championship; Saturday, March 15
1 | 1 Duke | 73
2 | 13 Louisville | 62

== Game summaries ==
=== First round ===
ACCN

March 11
2:00 p.m.

Report

No. 12 Notre Dame 55, No. 13 Pittsburgh 54
Scoring by half: 25–22, 30–32
| Pts: Davis (11); Rebs: Konstantynovskyi (9); Asts: Burton (3) | Pts: Lowe (17); Rebs: Leggett (7); Asts: Lowe (4) |

Spectrum Center
Charlotte, NC
Attendance: 5,136
Referees: Tony Henderson, Jeff Pon, Tommy Morrissey

ACCN

March 11
4:30 p.m.

Recap

No. 10 Virginia Tech 73, No. 15 California 82 (OT)
Scoring by half: 34–31, 26–29 Overtime: 7–7, 6–15
| Pts: Rechsteiner (19); Rebs: Lawal (12); Asts: 4 players (1) | Pts: Stojaković (29); Rebs: Petraitis, Sissoko (10); Asts: 3 players (2) |

Spectrum Center
Charlotte, NC
Attendance: 5,136
Referees: Eric Lewis, Justin Porterfield, Isaac Barnett

ACCN

March 11
7:45 p.m.

Report

No. 11 Florida State 62, No. 14 Syracuse 66
Scoring by half: 26–30, 36–36
| Pts: Watkins (16); Rebs: Watkins (11); Asts: Watkins (3) | Pts: Starling (27); Rebs: Lampkin Jr. (9); Asts: Carlos, Starling (2) |

Spectrum Center
Charlotte, NC
Attendance: 5,136
Referees: AJ Desai, Mark Schnur, Jerry Heater

=== Second round ===
ESPN2

March 12
12:00 p.m.

Report

No. 8 Georgia Tech 66, No. 9 Virginia 60
Scoring by half: 25–25, 41–35
| Pts: Powell (21); Rebs: George, Ndongo (10); Asts: George (8) | Pts: McKneely (27); Rebs: Cofie, Rodhe (5); Asts: Rodhe (3) |

Spectrum Center
Charlotte, NC
Attendance: 9,722
Referees: Lee Cassell, Tommy Morrissey, Mark Schnur

ESPN

March 12
2:30 p.m.

Report

No. 5 North Carolina 76, No. 12 Notre Dame 56
Scoring by half: 43–29, 33–27
| Pts: Withers (21); Rebs: Lubin (10); Asts: Cadeau (10) | Pts: Burton (11); Rebs: Konstantynovskyi (9); Asts: Mohammed (2) |

Spectrum Center
Charlotte, NC
Attendance: 9,722
Referees: Roger Ayers, Clarence Armstrong, Jemel Spearman

ESPN2

March 12
7:00 p.m.

Report

No. 7 Stanford 78, No. 15 California 73
Scoring by half: 38–32, 40–41
| Pts: Raynaud (23); Rebs: Raynaud (8); Asts: Blakes (6) | Pts: Stojaković (37); Rebs: Campbell (10); Asts: Tucker (4) |

Spectrum Center
Charlotte, NC
Attendance: 6,620
Referees: Bill Covington Jr., Ted Valentine, A.J. Desai

ESPNU

March 12
9:30 p.m.

Report

No. 6 SMU 73, No. 14 Syracuse 53
Scoring by half: 31–28, 42–25
| Pts: Cross, Harris (12); Rebs: Cross (9); Asts: Miller (4) | Pts: Starling (16); Rebs: Lampkin Jr. (10); Asts: Carlos (5) |

Spectrum Center
Charlotte, NC
Attendance: 6,620
Referees: Justin Porterfield, Bert Smith, Ron Groover

=== Quarterfinals ===
ESPN

March 13
12:00 p.m.

Report

No. 1 Duke 78, No. 8 Georgia Tech 70
Scoring by half: 26–31, 52–39
| Pts: Knueppel (28); Rebs: Maluach (9); Asts: Knueppel (8) | Pts: Powell (24); Rebs: Ndongo (7); Asts: George (7) |

Spectrum Center
Charlotte, NC
Attendance: 14,116
Referees: Ted Valentine, Tony Henderson, Jemel Spearman

ESPN

March 13
2:30 p.m.

Report

No. 4 Wake Forest 59, No. 5 North Carolina 68
Scoring by half: 31–33, 28–35
| Pts: Sallis (25); Rebs: Reid (10); Asts: 3 players (2) | Pts: Davis (23); Rebs: Lubin (13); Asts: Withers (3) |

Spectrum Center
Charlotte, NC
Attendance: 14,116
Referees: Ron Groover, Bill Covington Jr., Eric Lewis

ESPN2

March 13
7:00 p.m.

Report

No. 2 Louisville 75, No. 7 Stanford 73
Scoring by half: 30–33, 45–40
| Pts: Edwards Jr. (25); Rebs: Waterman (9); Asts: Hepburn (8) | Pts: Sellers (22); Rebs: Okpara (6); Asts: Blakes (5) |

Spectrum Center
Charlotte, NC
Attendance: 10,627
Referees: Lee Cassell, Bert Smith, Justin Porterfield

ESPN2

March 13
9:30 p.m.

Report

No. 3 Clemson 57, No. 6 SMU 54
Scoring by half: 28–27, 29–27
| Pts: C. Hunter (21); Rebs: Schieffelin (12); Asts: Schieffelin, Zackery (2) | Pts: Cross (13); Rebs: Yiğitoğlu (6); Asts: Miller (4) |

Spectrum Center
Charlotte, NC
Attendance: 10,627
Referees: Roger Ayers, Clarence Armstrong, Mark Schnur

=== Semifinals ===
ESPN

March 14
7:00 p.m.

Report

No. 1 Duke 74, No. 5 North Carolina 71
Scoring by half: 45–24, 29–47
| Pts: Knueppel (17); Rebs: Maluach (9); Asts: Knueppel (3) | Pts: Lubin (20); Rebs: Lubin (10); Asts: Cadeau (5) |

Spectrum Center
Charlotte, NC
Referees: Bert Smith
Lee Cassell
AJ Desai

ESPN

March 14
9:30 p.m.

Recap

No. 2 Louisville 76, No. 3 Clemson 73
Scoring by half: 33–28, 43–45
| Pts: Edwards Jr. (21); Rebs: Hadley (9); Asts: Hepburn (5) | Pts: C. Hunter (23); Rebs: Schieffelin (12); Asts: Zackery (3) |

Spectrum Center
Charlotte, NC
Attendance: 18,116
Referees: Ted Valentine
Tony Henderson
Tommy Morrissey

=== Final ===
ESPN

March 15
8:30 p.m.

Report

No. 1 Duke 73, No. 2 Louisville 62
Scoring by half: 33–38, 40–24
| Pts: Proctor (19); Rebs: Maluach (10); Asts: Foster, Knueppel (3) | Pts: Edwards Jr. (29); Rebs: Edwards Jr., Rooths (6); Asts: Hadley, Hepburn (3) |

Spectrum Center
Charlotte, NC
Attendance: 15,322
Referees: Roger Ayers
Ron Groover
Clarence Armstrong

== Awards and honors ==
**2025 ACC Men's Basketball All-Tournament Teams**
| First Team | Second Team |
| Terrence Edwards Jr. – Louisville; Chucky Hepburn – Louisville; **Kon Knueppel** – **Duke**; Khaman Maluach – Duke; Andrej Stojaković – California | Chase Hunter – Clemson; Ven-Allen Lubin – North Carolina; Duncan Powell – Georgia Tech; Tyrese Proctor – Duke; Ian Schieffelin – Clemson |

MVP in bold

== See also ==
- 2025 ACC women's basketball tournament
