= 2024–25 Penn State Nittany Lions basketball team =

American college basketball season

2024–25 Penn State Nittany Lions basketball
- Conference: Big Ten Conference
- Record: 16–15 (6–14 Big Ten)
- Head coach: Mike Rhoades (2nd season)
- Associate head coach: Jamal Brunt (2nd season)
- Assistant coaches: Brent Scott (2nd season); Jimmy Martelli (2nd season)
- Home arena: Bryce Jordan Center

2024–25 Big Ten Conference men's basketball standings
	Conf.				Overall
Team	W		L	PCT	W		L	PCT
No. 7 Michigan State	17	–	3	.850	30	–	7	.811
No. 9 Maryland	14	–	6	.700	27	–	9	.750
No. 10 Michigan †	14	–	6	.700	27	–	10	.730
UCLA	13	–	7	.650	23	–	11	.676
No. 16 Wisconsin	13	–	7	.650	27	–	10	.730
No. 14 Purdue	13	–	7	.650	24	–	12	.667
Illinois	12	–	8	.600	22	–	13	.629
Oregon	12	–	8	.600	25	–	10	.714
Indiana	10	–	10	.500	19	–	13	.594
Ohio State	9	–	11	.450	17	–	15	.531
Rutgers	8	–	12	.400	15	–	17	.469
Minnesota	7	–	13	.350	15	–	17	.469
Northwestern	7	–	13	.350	17	–	16	.515
USC	7	–	13	.350	17	–	18	.486
Iowa	7	–	13	.350	17	–	16	.515
Nebraska	7	–	13	.350	21	–	14	.600
Penn State	6	–	14	.300	16	–	15	.516
Washington	4	–	16	.200	13	–	18	.419
† 2025 Big Ten tournament winner Rankings from AP poll

The 2024–25 Penn State Nittany Lions basketball team represented Penn State University during the 2024–25 NCAA Division I men's basketball season. They were led by second-year head coach Mike Rhoades, and played their home games at Bryce Jordan Center in State College, Pennsylvania as members of the Big Ten Conference.

The Nittany Lions finished the season 16–15, 6–14 in Big Ten play, to finish in 17th place. As a result of finishing in the bottom three, they failed to qualify for the Big Ten tournament.

== Previous season ==
The Nittany Lions finished the 2023–24 season 16–17, 9–11 in Big Ten play, to finish in a three-way tie for 10th place. As the No. 11 seed in the Big Ten tournament, they defeated Michigan in the first round before losing to Indiana in the second round.

== Offseason ==
=== Departures ===
Penn State departures
Name	Number	Pos.	Height	Weight	Year	Hometown	Reason for departure
Kanye Clary	0	G	5' 11"	192	Sophomore	Virginia Beach, VA	Dismissed from the team; transferred to Mississippi State
Jameel Brown	5	G	6' 4"	188	Sophomore	Philadelphia, PA	Transferred to Temple
Bragi Guðmundsson	6	G	6' 5"	185	Freshman	Grindavík, Iceland	Transferred to Campbell
Leo O'Boyle	11	F	6' 7"	225	GS Senior	Scranton, PA	Graduated
Favour Aire	12	F	6' 11"	220	Sophomore	Ekpoma, Nigeria	Transferred to Bryant
Demetrius Lilley	14	F	6' 10"	245	Sophomore	Philadelphia, PA	Transferred to La Salle
Dan Conlan	15	G	6' 4"	186	Senior	Sewickley, PA	Walk-on; graduated
RayQuawndis Mitchell	21	G	6' 5"	195	GS Senior	Blaine, MN	Graduated
Qudus Wahab	22	F	6' 11"	245	GS Senior	Lagos, Nigeria	Graduated/signed to play professionally in Greece with Lavrio
Andy Christos	33	G	6' 5"	186	Senior	Madison, NJ	Walk-on; graduated

=== Incoming transfers ===
Penn State incoming transfers
Name	Number	Pos.	Height	Weight	Year	Hometown	Previous school
Freddie Dilione V	4	G	6' 5"	180	Sophomore	Fayetteville, NC	Tennessee
Eli Rice	11	G	6' 8"	213	Sophomore	Bradenton, FL	Nebraska
Yanic Konan Niederhäuser	14	F	6' 11"	215	Junior	Fräschels, Switzerland	Northern Illinois
Kachi Nzech	15	C	6' 8"	230	Sophomore	Upper Darby, PA	Xavier

=== Recruiting classes ===
==== 2024 recruiting class ====
College recruiting information
Name	Hometown	School	Height	Weight	Commit date
Miles Goodman #22 C	Seattle, WA	Southern California Academy	6 ft 10 in (2.08 m)	225 lb (102 kg)	Nov 6, 2023
Miles Goodman #22 C	Recruit ratings: Rivals: 247Sports: ESPN: (82)				
Jahvin Carter; SG	Alcoa, TN	Alcoa High School	6 ft 2 in (1.88 m)	175 lb (79 kg)	Jun 26, 2023
Jahvin Carter; SG	Recruit ratings: Rivals: 247Sports: ESPN:				
Dominick Stewart; PG	Lanham, MD	Southern California Academy	6 ft 5 in (1.96 m)	180 lb (82 kg)	Sep 22, 2023
Dominick Stewart; PG	Recruit ratings: Rivals: 247Sports: ESPN:				
Hudson Ward; SF	Edmonton, AB	Western Canada Prep Academy	6 ft 7 in (2.01 m)	210 lb (95 kg)	Jan 31, 2023
Hudson Ward; SF	Recruit ratings: Rivals: 247Sports: ESPN: (NR)				
Overall recruit ranking: Rivals: 39 247Sports: 25 ESPN: —
Note: In many cases, Scout, Rivals, 247Sports, On3, and ESPN may conflict in their listings of height and weight.; In these cases, the average was taken. ESPN grades are on a 100-point scale.; Sources: "Penn State 2024 Basketball Commitments". Rivals.; "2024 Penn State Nittany Lions Recruiting Class". ESPN.; "2024 Team Ranking". Rivals.; "Penn State 2024 Basketball Commits". 247Sports.

==== 2025 recruiting class ====
College recruiting information (2025)
Name	Hometown	School	Height	Weight	Commit date
Justin Houser #17 C	Camp Hill, PA	The Phelps School	7 ft 0 in (2.13 m)	205 lb (93 kg)	Jun 27, 2024
Justin Houser #17 C	Recruit ratings: Rivals: 247Sports: ESPN: (NR)				
Overall recruit ranking: Rivals: 39 247Sports: 25 ESPN: —
Note: In many cases, Scout, Rivals, 247Sports, On3, and ESPN may conflict in their listings of height and weight.; In these cases, the average was taken. ESPN grades are on a 100-point scale.; Sources: "Penn State 2025 Basketball Commitments". Rivals.; "2025 Penn State Nittany Lions Recruiting Class". ESPN.; "2025 Team Ranking". Rivals.; "Penn State 2025 Basketball Commits". 247Sports.

== Roster ==
2024–25 Penn State Nittany Lions men's basketball team
Players
Coaches

Pos.	#	Name	Height	Weight	Year	Previous school	Hometown
G	0	Jahvin Carter	6 ft 3 in (1.91 m)	175 lb (79 kg)	Fr	Alcoa HS	Alcoa, TN
G	1	Ace Baldwin Jr.	6 ft 1 in (1.85 m)	190 lb (86 kg)	GS	VCU	Baltimore, MD
G	2	D'Marco Dunn	6 ft 5 in (1.96 m)	195 lb (88 kg)	Sr	North Carolina	Tucson, AZ
G	3	Nick Jr. Kern	6 ft 6 in (1.98 m)	200 lb (91 kg)	Sr	VCU	St. Louis, MO
G	4	Freddie V Dilione (redshirt)	6 ft 5 in (1.96 m)	195 lb (88 kg)	So	Tennessee	Fayetteville, NC
G/F	5	Puff Johnson	6 ft 8 in (2.03 m)	205 lb (93 kg)	GS	North Carolina	Moon Township, PA
G	7	Dominick Stewart	6 ft 5 in (1.96 m)	180 lb (82 kg)	Fr	Southern California Academy	Ocean Springs, MS
F	8	Miles Goodman	6 ft 11 in (2.11 m)	205 lb (93 kg)	Fr	Southern California Academy	Seattle, WA
F	10	Joe Sedora (W)	6 ft 5 in (1.96 m)	185 lb (84 kg)	Fr	Red Lion Area Sr. HS	York, PA
G	11	Eli Rice	6 ft 8 in (2.03 m)	215 lb (98 kg)	So	Nebraska	Bradenton, FL
F	14	Yanic Konan Niederhäuser	7 ft 0 in (2.13 m)	255 lb (116 kg)	Jr	Northern Illinois	Fräschels, Switzerland
F	15	Kachi Nzeh	6 ft 8 in (2.03 m)	230 lb (104 kg)	So	Xavier	Upper Darby, PA
F	24	Zach Hicks	6 ft 8 in (2.03 m)	200 lb (91 kg)	Sr	Temple	Camden, NJ
F	52	Hudson Ward	6 ft 7 in (2.01 m)	210 lb (95 kg)	Fr	Western Canada Prep Academy	Leduc, AB

Head coach

- Mike Rhoades (Lebanon Valley)

Assistant coach(es)

- Jamal Brunt (Randolph–Macon)
- Brent Scott (Rice)
- Jimmy Martelli (Dickinson)

Legend

- (C) Team captain
- (S) Suspended
- (I) Ineligible
- (W) Walk-on
- Injured
- Current redshirt

Roster
Last update: January 16, 2026

== Schedule and results ==
Date time, TV	Rank^{#}	Opponent^{#}	Result	Record	High points	High rebounds	High assists	Site (attendance) city, state
Exhibition
October 25, 2024*; 8:00 p.m.		vs. Lafayette	W 79–64		15 – Niederhäuser	5 – tied	9 – Baldwin	Sorrentino Gymnasium (1,650); Annville, PA
Regular season
November 4, 2024*; 7:30 p.m., B1G+		Binghamton	W 108–66	1–0	22 – Hicks	7 – tied	4 – tied	Bryce Jordan Center (7,687); State College, PA
November 8, 2024*; 6:00 p.m., BTN		UMBC	W 103–54	2–0	18 – Niederhäuser	9 – Niederhäuser	8 – Baldwin	Bryce Jordan Center (7,353); State College, PA
November 12, 2024*; 7:00 p.m., Peacock		Saint Francis (PA)	W 92–62	3–0	20 – Johnson	7 – Niederhäuser	6 – Baldwin Jr.	Bryce Jordan Center (6,626); State College, PA
November 15, 2024*; 7:30 p.m., Peacock		vs. Virginia Tech; Hall of Fame Series Baltimore	W 86–64	4–0	19 – 2 tied	5 – 2 tied	10 – Baldwin	CFG Bank Arena (4,868); Baltimore, MD
November 20, 2024*; 7:00 p.m., B1G+		Purdue Fort Wayne; Sunshine Slam campus-site game	W 102–89	5–0	25 – Baldwin Jr.	10 – Niederhäuser	11 – Baldwin Jr.	Bryce Jordan Center (6,547); State College, PA
November 25, 2024*; 4:00 p.m., CBSSN		vs. Fordham; Sunshine Slam Beach Division semifinals	W 85–66	6–0	20 – Kern Jr.	13 – Kern Jr.	7 – Baldwin Jr.	Ocean Center; Daytona Beach, FL
November 26, 2024*; 4:00 p.m., CBSSN		vs. Clemson; Sunshine Slam Beach Division championship game	L 67–75	6–1	20 – Baldwin Jr.	6 – 3 tied	11 – Baldwin Jr.	Ocean Center; Daytona Beach, FL
December 1, 2024*; 2:00 p.m., BTN		Buffalo	W 87–64	7–1	27 – Niederhäuser	8 – Johnson	10 – Baldwin Jr.	Bryce Jordan Center (7,214); State College, PA
December 5, 2024; 6:30 p.m., FS1		No. 8 Purdue	W 81–70	8–1 (1–0)	17 – Baldwin Jr.	8 – Kern	6 – Baldwin Jr.	Bryce Jordan Center (8,802); State College, PA
December 10, 2024; 7:00 p.m., Peacock		at Rutgers	L 76–80	8–2 (1–1)	20 – Hicks	7 – Kern	7 – Baldwin Jr.	Jersey Mike's Arena (8,000); Piscataway, NJ
December 14, 2024*; 12:30 p.m., BTN		Coppin State	W 99–51	9–2	14 – Niederhäuser	8 – Johnson	16 – Baldwin Jr.	Bryce Jordan Center (6,557); State College, PA
December 21, 2024*; 12:00 p.m.		vs. Drexel; Holiday Hoopfest	W 75–64	10–2	18 – Niederhäuser	10 – Johnson	6 – 2 tied	Wells Fargo Center (2,312); Philadelphia, PA
December 29, 2024*; 1:00 p.m., Peacock		Penn	W 86–66	11–2	23 – Baldwin Jr.	15 – Niederhäuser	10 – Baldwin Jr.	Bryce Jordan Center (7,862); State College, PA
January 2, 2025; 7:00 p.m., Peacock		Northwestern	W 84–80	12–2 (2–1)	20 – Hicks	9 – Niederhäuser	7 – Baldwin Jr.	Bryce Jordan Center (5,579); State College, PA
January 5, 2025; 12:00 p.m., BTN		vs. Indiana	L 71–77	12–3 (2–2)	21 – Kern Jr.	8 – Niederhäuser	7 – Baldwin Jr.	Palestra (6,126); Philadelphia, PA
January 8, 2025; 9:00 p.m., BTN		at No. 13 Illinois	L 52–91	12–4 (2–3)	13 – Kern Jr.	7 – Hicks	2 – 2 tied	State Farm Center (13,883); Champaign, IL
January 12, 2025; 4:00 p.m., BTN		No. 15 Oregon	L 81–82	12–5 (2–4)	21 – Dilione V	8 – Kern Jr.	4 – 2 tied	Bryce Jordan Center (8,972); State College, PA
January 15, 2025; 7:30 p.m., BTN		at No. 12 Michigan State	L 85–90	12–6 (2–5)	20 – Baldwin Jr.	7 – Kern Jr.	9 – Baldwin Jr.	Breslin Center (14,797); East Lansing, MI
January 20, 2025; 6:30 p.m., Peacock		Rutgers	W 80–72	13–6 (3–5)	22 – Baldwin Jr.	6 – 2 tied	8 – Baldwin Jr.	Bryce Jordan Center (7,351); State College, PA
January 24, 2025; 9:00 p.m., FS1		at Iowa	L 75–76	13–7 (3–6)	18 – Kern Jr.	7 – 2 tied	7 – Baldwin Jr.	Carver–Hawkeye Arena (8,619); Iowa City, IA
January 27, 2025; 6:30 p.m., BTN		at Michigan	L 72–76	13–8 (3–7)	16 – Kern Jr.	10 – Kern Jr.	6 – Baldwin Jr.	Crisler Center (12,707); Ann Arbor, MI
January 30, 2025; 6:30 p.m., FS1		Ohio State	L 64–83	13–9 (3–8)	21 – Niederhäuser	5 – Niederhäuser	6 – Baldwin Jr.	Rec Hall (6,198); State College, PA
February 4, 2025; 7:00 p.m., BTN		Minnesota	L 61–69	13–10 (3–9)	18 – Dunn	7 – Kern Jr.	5 – Baldwin Jr.	Bryce Jordan Center (6,750); State College, PA
February 8, 2025; 4:00 p.m., BTN		at UCLA	L 54–78	13–11 (3–10)	14 – Hicks	8 – Hicks	3 – Baldwin Jr.	Pauley Pavilion (9,156); Los Angeles, CA
February 11, 2025; 9:00 p.m., BTN		at USC	L 67–92	13–12 (3–11)	18 – Baldwin Jr.	5 – Dunn	4 – Baldwin Jr.	Galen Center (4,638); Los Angeles, CA
February 15, 2025; 2:00 p.m., BTN		Washington	L 73–75	13–13 (3–12)	20 – Baldwin Jr.	11 – Niederhäuser	8 – Baldwin Jr.	Bryce Jordan Center (9,933); State College, PA
February 19, 2025; 6:30 p.m., BTN		Nebraska	W 89–72	14–13 (4–12)	19 – 2 tied	6 – 2 tied	7 – Kern Jr.	Bryce Jordan Center (7,115); State College, PA
February 22, 2025; 2:00 p.m., BTN		at Minnesota	W 69–60	15–13 (5–12)	24 – Niederhäuser	7 – Niederhäuser	7 – Baldwin Jr.	Williams Arena (11,292); Minneapolis, MN
February 26, 2025; 8:30 p.m., BTN		at Indiana	L 78–83	15–14 (5–13)	22 – Baldwin Jr.	7 – Niederhäuser	5 – Baldwin Jr.	Simon Skjodt Assembly Hall (17,222); Bloomington, IN
March 1, 2025; 12:00 p.m., BTN		No. 16 Maryland	L 64–68	15–15 (5–14)	18 – Baldwin Jr.	9 – Hicks	4 – Hicks	Bryce Jordan Center (10,298); State College, PA
March 8, 2025; 1:00 p.m., Peacock		at No. 12 Wisconsin	W 86–75	16–15 (6–14)	25 – Dunn	11 – Niederhäuser	9 – Baldwin Jr.	Kohl Center (16,838); Madison, WI
*Non-conference game. ^{#}Rankings from AP poll. (#) Tournament seedings in parentheses. All times are in Eastern Time.

== Rankings ==
Ranking movements Legend: ██ Increase in ranking ██ Decrease in ranking — = Not ranked RV = Received votes
	Week																				
Poll	Pre	1	2	3	4	5	6	7	8	9	10	11	12	13	14	15	16	17	18	19	Final
AP	—	—	RV	RV	—	RV	RV	RV	RV	—	—	—	—	—	—	—	—	—	—	—	—
Coaches	—	—	—	RV	—	RV	RV	RV	RV	—	—	—	—	—	—	—	—	—	—	—	—
