= 2024–25 Virginia Tech Hokies men's basketball team =

American college basketball season

2024–25 Virginia Tech Hokies men's basketball
- Conference: Atlantic Coast Conference
- Record: 13–19 (8–12 ACC)
- Head coach: Mike Young (6th season)
- Assistant coaches: J. D. Byers; Kevin Giltner; Christian Webster
- Home arena: Cassell Coliseum

2024–25 ACC men's basketball standings
| | Conf. | | | | Overall |
| Team | W | | L | PCT | W | | L | PCT |
|---|---|---|---|---|---|---|---|---|
| No. 3 Duke † | 19 | – | 1 | .950 | 35 | – | 4 | .897 |
| No. 21 Louisville | 18 | – | 2 | .900 | 27 | – | 8 | .771 |
| No. 22 Clemson | 18 | – | 2 | .900 | 27 | – | 7 | .794 |
| Wake Forest | 13 | – | 7 | .650 | 21 | – | 11 | .656 |
| North Carolina | 13 | – | 7 | .650 | 23 | – | 14 | .622 |
| SMU | 13 | – | 7 | .650 | 24 | – | 11 | .686 |
| Stanford | 11 | – | 9 | .550 | 21 | – | 14 | .600 |
| Georgia Tech | 10 | – | 10 | .500 | 17 | – | 17 | .500 |
| Virginia | 8 | – | 12 | .400 | 15 | – | 17 | .469 |
| Virginia Tech | 8 | – | 12 | .400 | 13 | – | 19 | .406 |
| Florida State | 8 | – | 12 | .400 | 17 | – | 15 | .531 |
| Notre Dame | 8 | – | 12 | .400 | 15 | – | 18 | .455 |
| Pittsburgh | 8 | – | 12 | .400 | 17 | – | 15 | .531 |
| Syracuse | 7 | – | 13 | .350 | 14 | – | 19 | .424 |
| California | 6 | – | 14 | .300 | 14 | – | 19 | .424 |
| NC State | 5 | – | 15 | .250 | 12 | – | 19 | .387 |
| Boston College | 4 | – | 16 | .200 | 12 | – | 19 | .387 |
| Miami (FL) | 3 | – | 17 | .150 | 7 | – | 24 | .226 |
† 2025 ACC tournament winner Rankings from AP poll

The 2024–25 Virginia Tech Hokies men's basketball team represented Virginia Tech during the 2024–25 NCAA Division I men's basketball season . The Hokies, led by sixth-year head coach Mike Young, played their home games at Cassell Coliseum in Blacksburg, Virginia, as members of the Atlantic Coast Conference.

The Hokies won their first three games of the season. They then went on a six-game losing streak, which began in the Hall of Fame Series against Penn State. They then lost their campus game in the Fort Myers Tip-Off against Jacksonville 74–64. They lost both games in Jacksonville as part of the main tournament. Upon returning they also lost their ACC–SEC Challenge game against Vanderbilt and their ACC opener against eighteenth ranked Pittsburgh. They broke their losing streak with a 95–67 win over North Carolina A&T. They finished their non-conference season with a loss at Saint Joseph's in the Holiday Hoopfest. They lost to fourth-ranked Duke to wrap the 2024 portion of the season. Over their next four ACC games, they went 3–1, with their only loss coming in California to Stanford. They defeated Miami, California, and NC State. However, they couldn't continue their success as they went on a three-game losing streak where they lost to Wake Forest, Georgia Tech, and Clemson. The Hokies went 3–3 over their next six games, which included a two-point win over Notre Dame, and a rivalry victory over Virginia by one point. However, the stretch included a home loss to Virginia and a loss to Boston College where the Hokies only scored 36 points. In their final five games they went 2–3, defeating Miami again and Syracuse in overtime. They lost to nineteenth ranked Louisville, North Carolina, and eleventh ranked Clemson in the final game of the regular season.

The Hokies finished the season 13–18 and 8–12 in ACC play to finish in a five-way tie for ninth place. As the tenth seed in the 2025 ACC tournament they faced fifteenth seed California in the First Round. Virginia Tech couldn't repeat their regular season win and were defeated 82–73 in double-overtime. They were not invited to the NCAA tournament or the NIT.

== Previous season ==
The Hokies finished the season 19–15, 10–10 in ACC play to finish in a tie for eighth place. As the eighth seed in the ACC tournament, they lost to ninth seed Florida State in the Second Round. They received an at-large bid to the National Invitation Tournament and were a third seed. They defeated Richmond in the First Round before losing to second-seed Ohio State in the Second Round to end their season.

== Offseason ==
=== Departures ===
Departures
| Name | Number | Pos. | Height | Weight | Year | Hometown | Reason for departure |
|---|---|---|---|---|---|---|---|
| Hunter Cattoor | 0 | G | 6'3" | 200 | Graduate Student | Orlando, Florida | Graduated |
| Rodney Rice | 1 | G | 6'4" | 195 | Sophomore | Clinton, South Carolina | Transferred to Maryland |
| MJ Collins | 2 | G | 6'4" | 195 | Sophomore | Clover, South Carolina | Transferred to Vanderbilt |
| Sean Pedulla | 3 | G | 6'1" | 195 | Junior | Edmond, Oklahoma | Transferred to Ole Miss |
| Mekhi Long | 4 | F | 6'7" | 200 | Graduate Student | Bryans Road, Maryland | Graduated |
| John Camden | 11 | G | 6'8" | 220 | (redshirt) Sophomore | Downingtown, Pennsylvania | Transferred to Delaware |
| Lynn Kidd | 15 | C | 6'10" | 235 | Senior | Gainesville, Florida | Transferred to Miami (FL) |
| Tyler Nickel | 23 | G/F | 6'7" | 220 | Sophomore | Harrisonburg, Virginia | Transferred to Vanderbilt |
| Robbie Beran | 31 | F | 6'9" | 215 | Graduate Student | Richmond, Virginia | Graduated |
| Michael Ward | 33 | G | 6'2" | 175 | Sophomore | Bethesda, Maryland | — |

=== Incoming transfers ===
Incoming transfers
| Name | Number | Pos. | Height | Weight | Year | Hometown | Previous school |
|---|---|---|---|---|---|---|---|
| Hysier Miller | 0 | G | 6'1" | 190 | Senior | Philadelphia, Pennsylvania | Temple |
| Tobi Lawal | 1 | F | 6'8" | 200 | Junior | London, England | VCU |
| Jaden Schutt | 2 | G | 6'5" | 190 | (redshirt) Sophomore | Yorkville, Illinois | Duke |
| Rodney Brown Jr. | 4 | G | 6'6" | 180 | Sophomore | Perris, California | California |
| Ben Burnham | 13 | F | 6'7" | 220 | Senior | Fort Mill, South Carolina | Charleston |

=== 2024 Recruiting class ===
College recruiting information
| Name | Hometown | School | Height | Weight | Commit date |
|---|---|---|---|---|---|
| Peter Carr; G | West Chester, Pennsylvania | West Chester East | 6 ft 5 in (1.96 m) | 195 lb (88 kg) | |
| Peter Carr; G | Recruit ratings: Rivals: 247Sports: ESPN: (NR) | | | | |
| Ben Hammond; G | Fairfax, Virginia | Paul VI | 5 ft 11 in (1.80 m) | 165 lb (75 kg) | May 17, 2024 |
| Ben Hammond; G | Recruit ratings: Rivals: 247Sports: ESPN: (NR) | | | | |
| Tyler Johnson; G | Orlando, Florida | Oak Ridge | 6 ft 5 in (1.96 m) | 190 lb (86 kg) | Aug 31, 2023 |
| Tyler Johnson; G | Recruit ratings: Rivals: 247Sports: ESPN: (82) | | | | |
| Ryan Jones Jr. F | Gainesville, Florida | The Rock School | 6 ft 8 in (2.03 m) | 225 lb (102 kg) | Oct 2, 2023 |
| Ryan Jones Jr. F | Recruit ratings: Rivals: 247Sports: ESPN: (85) | | | | |
| Brandon Rechsteiner; G | Acworth, Georgia | Etowah | 6 ft 1 in (1.85 m) | 185 lb (84 kg) | |
| Brandon Rechsteiner; G | Recruit ratings: Rivals: 247Sports: ESPN: (NR) | | | | |
Overall recruit ranking:
Note: In many cases, Scout, Rivals, 247Sports, On3, and ESPN may conflict in their listings of height and weight.; In these cases, the average was taken. ESPN grades are on a 100-point scale.; Sources: "2024 Virginia Tech Basketball Commitment List". Rivals.; "Virginia Tech". ESPN.; "2024 Team Ranking". Rivals.

== Roster ==
2024–25 Virginia Tech Hokies men's basketball team
Players
Coaches

| Pos. | # | Name | Height | Weight | Year | Previous school | Hometown |
|---|---|---|---|---|---|---|---|
| G | 0 | Hysier Miller | 6 ft 1 in (1.85 m) | 190 lb (86 kg) | Sr | Neumann Goretti; Temple | Philadelphia, PA |
| F | 1 | Tobi Lawal | 6 ft 8 in (2.03 m) | 200 lb (91 kg) | Jr | Lee Academy; VCU | London, ENG |
| G | 2 | Jaden Schutt | 6 ft 5 in (1.96 m) | 190 lb (86 kg) | RS So | Yorkville; Duke | Yorkville, IL |
| G | 3 | Jaydon Young | 6 ft 4 in (1.93 m) | 205 lb (93 kg) | So | Greensboro Day School | Goldsboro, NC |
| G | 4 | Rodney Brown Jr. | 6 ft 6 in (1.98 m) | 180 lb (82 kg) | So | Rancho Christian School; California | Perris, CA |
| C | 5 | Patrick Wessler | 7 ft 0 in (2.13 m) | 255 lb (116 kg) | RS So | Combine Academy | Matthews, NC |
| G | 7 | Brandon Rechsteiner | 6 ft 1 in (1.85 m) | 185 lb (84 kg) | Fr | Etowah | Acworth, GA |
| G | 8 | Peter Carr | 6 ft 5 in (1.96 m) | 195 lb (88 kg) | Fr | West Chester East | West Chester, PA |
| G | 9 | Conner Venable (W) | 6 ft 3 in (1.91 m) | 190 lb (86 kg) | So | The Heights School | Washington, D.C. |
| G | 10 | Tyler Johnson | 6 ft 5 in (1.96 m) | 190 lb (86 kg) | Fr | Oak Ridge | Orlando, FL |
| G | 11 | Ben Hammond | 5 ft 11 in (1.8 m) | 165 lb (75 kg) | Fr | Paul VI | Fairfax, VA |
| F | 13 | Ben Burnham | 6 ft 7 in (2.01 m) | 220 lb (100 kg) | Sr | Carmel Christian School; Charleston | Fort Mill, SC |
| F | 21 | Ryan Jones Jr. | 6 ft 8 in (2.03 m) | 225 lb (102 kg) | Fr | The Rock School | Gainesville, FL |
| F | 34 | Mylyjael Poteat | 6 ft 9 in (2.06 m) | 265 lb (120 kg) | GS | The Burlington School; Rice | Reidsville, NC |

Head coach

- Mike Young (Emory & Henry)

Assistant coach(es)

- J. D. Byers (Lebanon Valley)
- Kevin Giltner (Wofford)
- Christian Webster (Harvard)

Legend

- (C) Team captain
- (S) Suspended
- (I) Ineligible
- (W) Walk-on
- Injured
- Current redshirt

Roster
Last update: August 13, 2024

== Schedule and results ==
| Date time, TV | Rank^{#} | Opponent^{#} | Result | Record | High points | High rebounds | High assists | Site (attendance) city, state |
Regular season
| November 4, 2024*; 8:00 p.m., ACCNX/ESPN+ | | Delaware State | W 83–60 | 1–0 | 23 – Lawal | 8 – Lawal | 5 – Poteat | Cassell Coliseum (4,453); Blacksburg, VA |
| November 8, 2024*; 7:00 p.m., ACCNX/ESPN+ | | USC Upstate | W 93–74 | 2–0 | 19 – Tied | 8 – Lawal | 4 – Tied | Cassell Coliseum (6,327); Blacksburg, VA |
| November 11, 2024*; 7:00 p.m., ACCNX/ESPN+ | | Winthrop | W 58–52 | 3–0 | 17 – Schutt | 10 – Tied | 3 – Young | Cassell Coliseum (4,157); Blacksburg, VA |
| November 15, 2024*; 7:30 p.m., Peacock | | vs. Penn State; Hall of Fame Series | L 64–86 | 3–1 | 15 – Poteat | 9 – Lawal | 5 – Rechsteiner | CFG Bank Arena (4,868); Baltimore, MD |
| November 20, 2024*; 7:00 p.m., ACCNX/ESPN+ | | Jacksonville; Fort Myers Tip-Off campus game | L 64–74 | 3–2 | 15 – Poteat | 8 – Poteat | 3 – Tied | Cassell Coliseum (4,441); Blacksburg, VA |
| November 25, 2024*; 6:00 p.m., FS1 | | vs. Michigan; Fort Myers Tip-Off Beach Division semifinals | L 63–75 | 3–3 | 14 – Lawal | 7 – Poteat | 3 – Hammond | Suncoast Credit Union Arena (3,500); Fort Myers, FL |
| November 27, 2024*; 6:00 p.m., FS1 | | vs. South Carolina; Fort Myers Tip-Off Beach Division consolation game | L 60–70 | 3–4 | 12 – Young | 7 – Poteat | 4 – Rechsteiner | Suncoast Credit Union Arena (3,500); Fort Myers, FL |
| December 4, 2024*; 9:15 p.m., ACCN | | Vanderbilt; ACC–SEC Challenge | L 64–80 | 3–5 | 15 – Schutt | 7 – Poteat | 4 – Tied | Cassell Coliseum (4,973); Blacksburg, VA |
| December 7, 2024; 2:00 p.m., ESPNU | | No. 18 Pittsburgh | L 59–64 | 3–6 (0–1) | 16 – Lawal | 6 – Johnson | 4 – Rechsteiner | Cassell Coliseum (8,925); Blacksburg, VA |
| December 12, 2024*; 7:00 p.m., ACCNX/ESPN+ | | North Carolina A&T | W 95–67 | 4–6 | 17 – Hammond | 9 – Burnham | 5 – Tied | Cassell Coliseum (4,856); Blacksburg, VA |
| December 15, 2024*; 12:00 p.m., ACCNX/ESPN+ | | Navy | W 80–72 | 5–6 | 17 – Burnham | 4 – Brown Jr. | 4 – Rechsteiner | Cassell Coliseum (4,385); Blacksburg, VA |
| December 21, 2024*; 12:00 p.m., CBSSN | | vs. Saint Joseph's; Holiday Hoopfest | L 62–82 | 5–7 | 11 – Tied | 5 – Schutt | 5 – Rechsteiner | Palestra (2,346); Philadelphia, PA |
| December 31, 2024; 4:30 p.m., ACCN | | at No. 4 Duke | L 65–88 | 5–8 (0–2) | 19 – Lawal | 5 – Lawal | 4 – Tied | Cameron Indoor Stadium (9,314); Durham, NC |
| January 4, 2025; 2:00 p.m., ACCN | | Miami | W 86–85 | 6–8 (1–2) | 25 – Poteat | 6 – Lawal | 8 – Hammond | Cassell Coliseum (8,925); Blacksburg, VA |
| January 8, 2025; 9:00 p.m., ACCN | | at Stanford | L 59–70 | 6–9 (1–3) | 18 – Burnham | 5 – Lawal | 3 – Tied | Maples Pavilion (3,262); Stanford, CA |
| January 11, 2025; 6:00 p.m., ACCN | | at California | W 71–68 | 7–9 (2–3) | 14 – Young | 12 – Johnson | 5 – Brown Jr. | Haas Pavilion (4,003); Berkeley, CA |
| January 15, 2025; 7:00 p.m., ESPNU | | NC State | W 79–76 | 8–9 (3–3) | 22 – Lawal | 11 – Lawal | 4 – Young | Cassell Coliseum (5,634); Blacksburg, VA |
| January 18, 2025; 2:00 p.m., ACCN | | Wake Forest | L 63–72 | 8–10 (3–4) | 12 – Schutt | 12 – Lawal | 3 – Johnson | Cassell Coliseum (8,925); Blacksburg, VA |
| January 22, 2025; 7:00 p.m., ESPNU | | at Georgia Tech | L 64–71 | 8–11 (3–5) | 14 – Johnson | 6 – Lawal | 6 – Rechsteiner | McCamish Pavilion (3,668); Atlanta, GA |
| January 25, 2025; 5:00 p.m., ACCN | | Clemson | L 57–72 | 8–12 (3–6) | 14 – Lawal | 6 – Lawal | 2 – Tied | Cassell Coliseum (8,925); Blacksburg, VA |
| January 29, 2025; 7:00 p.m., ACCN | | at Florida State | W 76–66 | 9–12 (4–6) | 17 – Lawal | 13 – Lawal | 3 – Brown Jr. | Donald L. Tucker Civic Center (6,448); Tallahassee, FL |
| February 1, 2025; 4:00 p.m., ACCN | | at Virginia; Commonwealth Clash rivalry | W 75–74 | 10–12 (5–6) | 18 – Schutt | 6 – Burnham | 3 – Tied | John Paul Jones Arena (14,637); Charlottesville, VA |
| February 5, 2025; 9:00 p.m., ACCN | | SMU | L 75–81 | 10–13 (5–7) | 15 – Tied | 10 – Poteat | 5 – Poteat | Cassell Coliseum (8,925); Blacksburg, VA |
| February 8, 2025; 1:00 p.m., The CW | | at Notre Dame | W 65–63 | 11–13 (6–7) | 15 – Lawal | 10 – Lawal | 4 – Hammond | Purcell Pavilion (6,959); South Bend, IN |
| February 15, 2025; 2:00 p.m., The CW | | Virginia; Commonwealth Clash rivalry | L 70–73 | 11–14 (6–8) | 23 – Lawal | 7 – Lawal | 3 – Tied | Cassell Coliseum (8,925); Blacksburg, VA |
| February 18, 2025; 9:00 p.m., ACCN | | at Boston College | L 36–54 | 11–15 (6–9) | 10 – Poteat | 10 – Lawal | 2 – Tied | Conte Forum (2,567); Chestnut Hill, MA |
| February 22, 2025; 6:00 p.m., ACCN | | at Miami | W 81–68 | 12–15 (7–9) | 27 – Young | 9 – Lawal | 5 – Rechsteiner | Watsco Center (5,290); Coral Gables, FL |
| February 25, 2025; 9:00 p.m., ACCN | | No. 19 Louisville | L 67–71 | 12–16 (7–10) | 18 – Rechsteiner | 6 – Wessler | 4 – Rechsteiner | Cassell Coliseum (8,925); Blacksburg, VA |
| March 1, 2025; 12:00 p.m., The CW | | Syracuse | W 101–95 ^{OT} | 13–16 (8–10) | 26 – Young | 7 – Hammond | 7 – Hammond | Cassell Coliseum (8,925); Blacksburg, VA |
| March 4, 2025; 7:00 p.m., ESPNU | | North Carolina | L 59–91 | 13–17 (8–11) | 12 – Tied | 9 – Burnham | 3 – Hammond | Cassell Coliseum (8,925); Blacksburg, VA |
| March 8, 2025; 6:00 p.m., ESPNU | | at No. 11 Clemson | L 47–65 | 13–18 (8–12) | 11 – Rechsteiner | 7 – Burnham | 2 – Tied | Littlejohn Coliseum (9,000); Clemson, SC |
ACC tournament
| March 11, 2025; 4:30 p.m., ACCN | (10) | vs. (15) California; First round | L 73–82 ^{2OT} | 13–19 | 19 – Rechsteiner | 12 – Lawal | 1 – Tied | Spectrum Center (5,136); Charlotte, NC |
*Non-conference game. ^{#}Rankings from AP poll. (#) Tournament seedings in parentheses. All times are in Eastern Time.
