= Gotham Classic =

Annual American college basketball tournament

The Gotham Classic is an annual college basketball event played at the beginning of the season, featuring NCAA Division I men's basketball teams. The event is produced by the Gazelle Group, Inc. and was first played in 2012. The event has been played in Madison Square Garden in New York City six out of its twelve years, and will be played at Barclays Center in 2024. The sponsors for the event have changed year to year, with O'Reilly Auto Parts, Discount Tire, Guaranteed Rate, and Nutrafol as the most recent sponsors.

The most recent winner of the Gotham Classic is Maryland, who defeated Syracuse 87–60 in the 2024 game.

== History ==
The inaugural Gotham Classic took place in 2012, with Temple winning 83–79 over No. 3 Syracuse. The win marked the fifth straight season Temple had beaten a top 10 team while being unranked themselves. As for Syracuse, this loss snapped its 52-game regular season non-conference winning streak. The event featured five teams, with two making the showcase game. This format would last up until 2021.

The event was played in Madison Square Garden in New York City its first four years, up until 2016, when it began to move around. In 2016, the event was played in the Mullins Center in Amherst, Massachusetts. In 2017, the event was moved back to Madison Square Garden in New York City. In 2018, the event was played in the Edmund P. Joyce Center in Notre Dame, Indiana. In 2019, the event was played in Conte Forum in Chestnut Hill, Massachusetts.

COVID-19 caused cancelation of the 2020 Gotham Classic, but in 2021 Madison Square Garden opened its doors to the event which featured St. John’s taking on long-time former Big East foe Pitt. This was the first year of the four team format. In 2022, the event was played in UBS Arena in Belmont Park, New York, and continued the four team format.

=== Yearly champions, runners-up, and MVPs ===
Year	Winner	Score	Opponent	Tournament MVP	Other Participants	Venue
2024	Maryland	87–60	Syracuse	Selton Miguel (Maryland)	—	Barclays Center, Brooklyn, NY
2023	Mississippi State	70–60	Rutgers	Jimmy Bell Jr. (Mississippi State)	—	Prudential Center, Newark, NJ
2022	St. Bonaventure	63–51	Notre Dame	Chad Venning (St. Bonaventure)	Bowling Green, Southern Indiana	UBS Arena, Belmont Park, NY
2021	Pittsburgh	59–57	St. John's	Jamarius Burton (Pittsburgh)	Monmouth, Colgate	Madison Square Garden, New York, NY
2020	Cancelled due to COVID-19					
2019	Saint Louis	64–54	Boston College	Jordan Goodwin, Saint Louis	Eastern Washington, Belmont, High Point	Conte Forum, Chestnut Hill, MA
2018	Notre Dame	67–56	Duquesne	John Mooney, Notre Dame	Radford, William & Mary, UIC	Edmund P. Joyce Center, Notre Dame, IN
2017	Louisville	81–72	Memphis	Quentin Snider, Louisville	Siena, Albany, Bryant	Madison Square Garden, New York, NY
2016	Massachusetts	72–48	Pacific	Malik Hines, Massachusetts	Rider, Kennesaw State, North Carolina A&T	Mullins Center, Amherst, MA
2015	Pittsburgh	94–69	Davidson	Michael Young, Pittsburgh	Western Carolina, Morehead State, Eastern Washington	Madison Square Garden, New York, NY
2014	Richmond	65–63	Pepperdine	T.J. Cline, Richmond	IUPUI, Howard, South Alabama	Madison Square Garden, New York, NY
2013	Ohio State	64–61	Notre Dame	LaQuinton Ross, Ohio State	Delaware, Bryant, North Dakota State	Madison Square Garden, New York, NY
2012	Temple	83–79	Syracuse	Khalif Wyatt, Temple	Detroit, Canisius, Alcorn State	Madison Square Garden, New York, NY
