= 2024–25 Boston College Eagles men's basketball team =

American college basketball season

2024–25 Boston College Eagles men's basketball

Cayman Islands Classic champions
- Conference: Atlantic Coast Conference
- Record: 12–19 (4–16 ACC)
- Head coach: Earl Grant (4th season)
- Assistant coaches: Corey McCrae; Jim Molinari; Steve Smith
- Home arena: Conte Forum

2024–25 ACC men's basketball standings
	Conf.				Overall
Team	W		L	PCT	W		L	PCT
No. 3 Duke †	19	–	1	.950	35	–	4	.897
No. 21 Louisville	18	–	2	.900	27	–	8	.771
No. 22 Clemson	18	–	2	.900	27	–	7	.794
Wake Forest	13	–	7	.650	21	–	11	.656
North Carolina	13	–	7	.650	23	–	14	.622
SMU	13	–	7	.650	24	–	11	.686
Stanford	11	–	9	.550	21	–	14	.600
Georgia Tech	10	–	10	.500	17	–	17	.500
Virginia	8	–	12	.400	15	–	17	.469
Virginia Tech	8	–	12	.400	13	–	19	.406
Florida State	8	–	12	.400	17	–	15	.531
Notre Dame	8	–	12	.400	15	–	18	.455
Pittsburgh	8	–	12	.400	17	–	15	.531
Syracuse	7	–	13	.350	14	–	19	.424
California	6	–	14	.300	14	–	19	.424
NC State	5	–	15	.250	12	–	19	.387
Boston College	4	–	16	.200	12	–	19	.387
Miami (FL)	3	–	17	.150	7	–	24	.226
† 2025 ACC tournament winner Rankings from AP poll

The 2024–25 Boston College Eagles men's basketball team represented Boston College during the 2024–25 NCAA Division I men's basketball season. The Eagles were led by fourth-year head coach Earl Grant and played their home games at the Conte Forum as members of the Atlantic Coast Conference.

The Eagles won their opening game of the season against The Citadel, but fell in their next game to VCU 80–55. They then won two games before traveling to the Cayman Islands to participate in the Cayman Islands Classic. There they won three straight games to finish as champions. They defeated Old Dominion in the Quarterfinals, Missouri State by two points in the Semifinals, and Boise State by two points in the final. They didn't fare as well upon returning to the United States as they lost their next three games. These losses included their ACC–SEC Challenge game against South Carolina and their ACC opener against Wake Forest. They won three of their next four games, with their sole loss coming against SMU. From there, the Eagles went on a six-game losing streak, which included an eight point loss against Syracuse, a loss against third ranked Duke and an overtime loss at North Carolina. The Eagles broke their losing streak with a 77–76 win over Florida State. Their lost their next four straight games, including a triple overtime loss to Syracuse, and a double overtime loss against Notre Dame. They won their next two games against Virginia Tech and Georgia Tech before losing four straight games to end the season. All four of their losses were by double-digits and they played one ranked team, number eleven Clemson, over the stretch.

The Eagles finished the season 12–19 and 4–16 in ACC play to finish in seventeenth place. Under the new ACC tournament rules, they did not qualify for the 2025 ACC tournament. They were not invited to the NCAA tournament or the NIT.

== Previous season ==
The Eagles finished the season 20–16, 8–12 in ACC play to finish in eleventh place. As the eleventh seed the ACC tournament, they defeated Miami in the First Round, and Clemson in the Second Round before losing to Virginia in the Quarterfinals. They received an at-large bid to the National Invitation Tournament as an un-seeded team. They defeated third-seed Providence in the First Round before losing at UNLV in the Second Round to end their season.

== Offseason ==
=== Departures ===
Departures
Name	Number	Pos.	Height	Weight	Year	Hometown	Reason for departure
Claudell Harris Jr.	1	G	6'3"	190	Junior	Hahnville, Louisiana	Transferred to Mississippi State
Armani Mighty	2	C	6'10"	240	Sophomore	Toronto, Canada	Transferred to Central Michigan
Jaeden Zackery	3	G	6'2"	220	Junior	Salem, Wisconsin	Transferred to Clemson
Abe Atiyeh	4	G	6'0"	195	Senior	Bethlehem, Pennsylvania	Graduated
Prince Aligbe	10	G/F	6'7"	225	Sophomore	Minneapolis, Minnesota	Transferred to Seton Hall
Quinten Post	12	F/C	7'0"	235	Graduate Student	Amsterdam, Netherlands	Graduated; drafted 52nd overall in the 2024 NBA Draft
Devin McGlockton	21	F	6'7"	230	Sophomore	Cumming, Georgia	Transferred to Vanderbilt
Mason Madsen	45	G	6'4"	200	Senior	Rochester, Minnesota	Graduated, transferred to Utah

=== Incoming transfers ===
Boston College incoming transfers
Name	Number	Pos.	Height	Weight	Year	Hometown	Previous school
Dion Brown	1	G	6'3"	185	Junior	Great Barrington, Massachusetts	UMBC
Roger McFarlane	3	G	6'5"	205	Graduate Student	Fort Lauderdale, Florida	Southeastern Louisiana
Joshua Beadle	7	G	6'3"	180	Graduate Student	Columbia, South Carolina	Clemson
Chad Venning	32	F/C	6'10"	255	Graduate Student	Brooklyn, New York	St. Bonaventure

=== 2024 Recruiting class ===
College recruiting
Name	Hometown	School	Height	Weight	Commit date
Luka Toews; PG	Boston, MA	The Newman School	6 ft 1 in (1.85 m)	155 lb (70 kg)	Jul 16, 2023
Luka Toews; PG	Recruit ratings: Rivals: 247Sports: ESPN: (NR)				
Nick Petronio; PG	Milton, MA	Milton Academy	6 ft 3 in (1.91 m)	170 lb (77 kg)	Mar 24, 2023
Nick Petronio; PG	Recruit ratings: Rivals: 247Sports: ESPN: (NR)				
Kany Tchanda; C	Kel Aire, KS	Sunrise Christian Academy	6 ft 8 in (2.03 m)	215 lb (98 kg)	May 14, 2024
Kany Tchanda; C	Recruit ratings: Rivals: 247Sports: ESPN: (81)				
Overall recruit ranking:
Note: In many cases, Scout, Rivals, 247Sports, On3, and ESPN may conflict in their listings of height and weight.; In these cases, the average was taken. ESPN grades are on a 100-point scale.; Sources: "Boston College Eagles". Rivals.; "Boston College 2024 Basketball Commits". Scout.; "Boston College Eagles". ESPN.; "Scout.com Team Recruiting Rankings". Scout.; "2024 Team Ranking". Rivals.

== Roster ==
2024–25 Boston College Eagles men's basketball team
Players
Coaches

Pos.	#	Name	Height	Weight	Year	Previous school	Hometown
G	00	Chas Kelley III	6 ft 5 in (1.96 m)	180 lb (82 kg)	Jr	The Phelps School	Houston, Texas
G	1	Dion Brown	6 ft 3 in (1.91 m)	185 lb (84 kg)	Jr	Vermont Academy; UMBC	Great Barrington, Massachusetts
G	3	Roger McFarlane	6 ft 5 in (1.96 m)	205 lb (93 kg)	GS	University School; Southeastern Louisiana	Fort Lauderdale, Florida
G	4	Jack Di Donna	6 ft 0 in (1.83 m)	185 lb (84 kg)	So	Saint Andrew's	Boca Raton, Florida
G	5	Fred Payne	6 ft 2 in (1.88 m)	180 lb (82 kg)	So	Legacy the School of Sport Sciences	Grambling, Louisiana
G	7	Josh Beadle	6 ft 3 in (1.91 m)	180 lb (82 kg)	RS So	Cardinal Newman; Clemson	Columbia, South Carolina
F	8	Kany Tchanda	6 ft 9 in (2.06 m)	210 lb (95 kg)	Fr	Sunrise Christian	Kinshasa, DRC
G	190	Luka Toews	6 ft 1 in (1.85 m)	10 lb (5 kg)	Fr	The Newman School	Tokyo, Japan
G	11	Nick Petronio	6 ft 3 in (1.91 m)	190 lb (86 kg)	Fr	Milton Academy	Needham, Massachusetts
G	13	Donald Hand Jr.	6 ft 5 in (1.96 m)	200 lb (91 kg)	So	Landstown	Virginia Beach, Virginia
G	21	Ethan Soares	6 ft 4 in (1.93 m)	225 lb (102 kg)	So	Memorial	Houston, Texas
F	22	Jayden Hastings	6 ft 9 in (2.06 m)	225 lb (102 kg)	RS Fr	IMG Academy	Orlando, Florida
F	31	Elijah Strong	6 ft 8 in (2.03 m)	225 lb (102 kg)	So	Myers Park	Charlotte, North Carolina
F/C	32	Chad Venning	6 ft 10 in (2.08 m)	255 lb (116 kg)	GS	Woodstock Academy; St. Bonaventure	Brooklyn, New York

Head coach

- Earl Grant (Georgia College)

Assistant coach(es)

- Corey McCrae (Wagner)
- Jim Molinari (Illinois Wesleyan)
- Steve Smith (Morgan State)

Legend

- (C) Team captain
- (S) Suspended
- (I) Ineligible
- (W) Walk-on
- Injured
- Current redshirt

Roster
Last update: August 2, 2024

== Schedule and results ==
Date time, TV	Rank^{#}	Opponent^{#}	Result	Record	High points	High rebounds	High assists	Site (attendance) city, state
Regular season
November 4, 2024*; 8:00 p.m., ACCNX/ESPN+		The Citadel	W 69–60	1–0	22 – Hand Jr.	10 – Hand Jr.	3 – Tied	Conte Forum (4,529); Chestnut Hill, MA
November 8, 2024*; 6:00 p.m., CBSSN		vs. VCU; Veterans Classic	L 55–80	1–1	17 – Hand Jr.	11 – McFarlane	2 – Toews	Alumni Hall; Annapolis, MD
November 15, 2024*; 7:00 p.m., ACCNX/ESPN+		Temple	W 72–69	2–1	25 – Strong	13 – Strong	8 – Kelley III	Conte Forum (4,863); Chestnut Hill, MA
November 19, 2024*; 6:00 p.m., ACCNX/ESPN+		Loyola (MD)	W 82–61	3–1	12 – Tied	14 – Ilic	4 – Ilic	Conte Forum (3,102); Chestnut Hill, MA
November 24, 2024*; 7:30 p.m., FloHoops		vs. Old Dominion; Cayman Islands Classic quarterfinals	W 82–52	4–1	12 – Hand Jr.	11 – McFarlane	5 – McFarlane	John Gray Gymnasium; George Town, Cayman Islands
November 25, 2024*; 7:30 p.m., FloHoops		vs. Missouri State; Cayman Islands Classic semifinals	W 76–74 ^{OT}	5–1	18 – Tied	8 – Hand Jr.	6 – Kelly III	John Gray Gymnasium (915); George Town, Cayman Islands
November 26, 2024*; 7:30 p.m., FloHoops		vs. Boise State; Cayman Islands Classic championship	W 63–61	6–1	16 – Venning	7 – Tied	2 – Tied	John Gray Gymnasium (1,075); George Town, Cayman Islands
November 29, 2024*; 12:00 p.m., ACCNX/ESPN+		Dartmouth	L 83–88	6–2	19 – Beadle	5 – Tied	3 – Kelly III	Conte Forum (2,499); Chestnut Hill, MA
December 3, 2024*; 7:00 p.m., ACCN		South Carolina; ACC–SEC Challenge	L 51–73	6–3	12 – Venning	7 – Hand Jr.	4 – Kelley III	Conte Forum (4,607); Chestnut Hill, MA
December 7, 2024; 12:00 p.m., ACCN		at Wake Forest	L 66–72	6–4 (0–1)	18 – Strong	8 – Hand Jr.	5 – Brown	LVJM Coliseum (10,254); Winston-Salem, NC
December 15, 2024*; 4:00 p.m., ACCNX/ESPN+		Stonehill	W 73–69	7–4	13 – Venning	6 – McFarlane	2 – Hand Jr.	Conte Forum (3,993); Chestnut Hill, MA
December 21, 2024; 12:00 p.m., The CW		SMU	L 77–103	7–5 (0–2)	22 – Hand Jr.	10 – Strong	4 – Beadle	Conte Forum (4,168); Chestnut Hill, MA
December 28, 2024*; 2:00 p.m., ACCN		Fairleigh Dickinson	W 78–70	8–5	29 – Hand Jr.	10 – Hand Jr.	4 – Brown	Conte Forum (4,663); Chestnut Hill, MA
January 1, 2025; 12:00 p.m., ACCN		Miami (FL); Fight for Literacy Game	W 78–68	9–5 (1–2)	17 – Venning	9 – Hastings	3 – Tied	Conte Forum (5,035); Chestnut Hill, MA
January 4, 2025; 12:00 p.m., ESPNU		at Georgia Tech	L 64–85	9–6 (1–3)	19 – Venning	8 – Venning	4 – Toews	McCamish Pavilion (3,949); Atlanta, GA
January 11, 2025; 3:00 p.m., The CW		Syracuse	L 71–79	9–7 (1–4)	20 – Hand Jr.	9 – Hand Jr.	6 – Beadle	Conte Forum (6,287); Chestnut Hill, MA
January 13, 2025; 7:00 p.m., ACCN		at Notre Dame	L 60–78	9–8 (1–5)	17 – Hand Jr.	4 – Tied	3 – Hand Jr.	Joyce Center (4,693); South Bend, IN
January 18, 2025; 8:00 p.m., ESPN		No. 3 Duke	L 63–88	9–9 (1–6)	19 – Venning	4 – Brown	2 – Brown	Conte Forum (8,606); Chestnut Hill, MA
January 21, 2025; 7:00 p.m., ACCN		at Virginia	L 56–74	9–10 (1–7)	17 – Payne	6 – Brown	4 – Beadle	John Paul Jones Arena (13,481); Charlottesville, VA
January 25, 2025; 2:15 p.m., The CW		at North Carolina	L 96–102 ^{OT}	9–11 (1–8)	26 – Hand Jr.	6 – Hand Jr.	6 – Beadle	Dean Smith Center (21,750); Chapel Hill, NC
February 1, 2025; 2:00 p.m., ACCN		Florida State	W 77–76	10–11 (2–8)	31 – Hand Jr.	9 – Hand Jr.	5 – Beadle	Conte Forum (6,083); Chestnut Hill, MA
February 5, 2025; 7:00 p.m., ACCN		Louisville	L 58–84	10–12 (2–9)	19 – Hand Jr.	9 – Hastings	1 – Tied	Conte Forum (4,204); Chestnut Hill, MA
February 8, 2025; 3:15 p.m., The CW		at Syracuse	L 86–95 ^{3OT}	10–13 (2–10)	28 – Hand Jr.	8 – McFarlane	6 – Beadle	JMA Wireless Dome (20,881); Syracuse, NY
February 12, 2025; 9:00 p.m., ESPNU		Notre Dame	L 94–97 ^{2OT}	10–14 (2–11)	21 – Venning	9 – McFarlane	6 – Beadle	Conte Forum (2,678); Chestnut Hill, MA
February 15, 2025; 2:00 p.m., ACCN		at NC State	L 62–70	10–15 (2–12)	22 – Hand Jr.	8 – Tied	4 – Kelly III	Lenovo Center (13,190); Raleigh, NC
February 18, 2025; 9:00 p.m., ACCN		Virginia Tech	W 54–36	11–15 (3–12)	16 – Hand Jr.	5 – Hastings	3 – Tied	Conte Forum (2,567); Chestnut Hill, MA
February 22, 2025; 2:00 p.m., ACCN		Georgia Tech	W 69–54	12–15 (4–12)	20 – Hand Jr.	7 – Tied	4 – Tied	Conte Forum (6,038); Chestnut Hill, MA
February 26, 2025; 9:00 p.m., ACCN		at Stanford	L 60–78	12–16 (4–13)	13 – Venning	5 – McFarlane	3 – Kelley III	Maples Pavilion (2,925); Stanford, CA
March 1, 2025; 10:00 p.m., ESPNU		at California	L 71–82	12–17 (4–14)	19 – Hand Jr.	10 – Brown	2 – Tied	Haas Pavilion (5,020); Berkeley, CA
March 5, 2025; 7:00 p.m., ESPNU		No. 11 Clemson	L 69–78	12–18 (4–15)	18 – Hastings	6 – Strong	4 – Toews	Conte Forum (4,362); Chestnut Hill, MA
March 8, 2025; 6:00 p.m., ACCN		at Pittsburgh	L 67–93	12–19 (4–16)	14 – Strong	5 – Hand Jr.	3 – Tied	Petersen Events Center (7,884); Pittsburgh, PA
*Non-conference game. ^{#}Rankings from AP Poll. (#) Tournament seedings in parentheses. All times are in Eastern Time.
