= 2024–25 Clemson Tigers men's basketball team =

American college basketball team

2024–25 Clemson Tigers men's basketball

Sunshine Slam Beach Bracket champions

NCAA tournament, First Round
- Conference: Atlantic Coast Conference

Ranking
- Coaches: No. 23
- AP: No. 22
- Record: 27–7 (18–2 ACC)
- Head coach: Brad Brownell (15th season)
- Associate head coach: Billy Donlon (3rd season)
- Assistant coaches: Sean Dixon (3rd season); Dick Bender (9th season)
- Home arena: Littlejohn Coliseum (Capacity: 9,000)

2024–25 ACC men's basketball standings
	Conf.				Overall
Team	W		L	PCT	W		L	PCT
No. 3 Duke †	19	–	1	.950	35	–	4	.897
No. 21 Louisville	18	–	2	.900	27	–	8	.771
No. 22 Clemson	18	–	2	.900	27	–	7	.794
Wake Forest	13	–	7	.650	21	–	11	.656
North Carolina	13	–	7	.650	23	–	14	.622
SMU	13	–	7	.650	24	–	11	.686
Stanford	11	–	9	.550	21	–	14	.600
Georgia Tech	10	–	10	.500	17	–	17	.500
Virginia	8	–	12	.400	15	–	17	.469
Virginia Tech	8	–	12	.400	13	–	19	.406
Florida State	8	–	12	.400	17	–	15	.531
Notre Dame	8	–	12	.400	15	–	18	.455
Pittsburgh	8	–	12	.400	17	–	15	.531
Syracuse	7	–	13	.350	14	–	19	.424
California	6	–	14	.300	14	–	19	.424
NC State	5	–	15	.250	12	–	19	.387
Boston College	4	–	16	.200	12	–	19	.387
Miami (FL)	3	–	17	.150	7	–	24	.226
† 2025 ACC tournament winner Rankings from AP poll

The 2024–25 Clemson Tigers men's basketball team represented Clemson University during the 2024–25 NCAA Division I men's basketball season. The Tigers, led by fifteenth-year head coach Brad Brownell, played their home games at Littlejohn Coliseum in Clemson, South Carolina as members of the Atlantic Coast Conference.

After a run to the Elite Eight in the previous season, head coach Brownell signed a five-year contract extension worth a total of $20 million.

The season started with three straight wins over non-Power 4 schools before the Tigers took a trip to Boise State. There they suffered their first loss of the season 84–71 against the Broncos. They then participated in the Sunshine Slam, where they won three straight games to finish as champions of the Beach Bracket. They defeated Radford, San Francisco, and Penn State in the Final. They then defeated their first ranked opponent of the season in fourth-ranked Kentucky as part of the ACC–SEC Challenge. The Tigers then won their ACC opener by ten points against Miami. They vaulted to sixteenth in the rankings after the defeat of Miami. However, an overtime loss to Memphis saw them drop to twenty-fifth in the rankings. There the team lost to rivals South Carolina, also in overtime, and defeat Wake Forest. The win was not enough to keep the team in the rankings, however. The Tigers then defeated ACC newcomers Stanford and California at home, before suffering their first ACC loss of the season at Louisville. After the loss, Clemson went on a six game winning streak, where they won each game by double-digits, with the exception of an overtime victory at Pittsburgh. The streak was broken against Georgia Tech in a triple-overtime 89–86 loss at home. The Tigers rebounded with a 77–71 defeat of second-ranked Duke. The Georgia Tech loss would be the Tiger's last loss of the regular season as they went on an eight game winning streak to finish the season. The streak included wins over North Carolina, ACC newcomers SMU, and a final-day victory over Virginia Tech. The only victories that did not come by double-digits were the Duke victory, and a March 5 game at Boston College, which they won by nine points. The streak saw the Tigers go from unranked to tenth in the polls.

The Tigers finished the season 27–7 and 18–2 in ACC play to finish in a tie for second place. As the third seed in the 2025 ACC tournament earned a bye into Quarterfinals where they defeated sixth seed SMU. In the Semifinals they could not avenge a regular season loss to Louisville as they lost by three points. They received an at-large bid to the NCAA Tournament. The Tigers were a five-seed in the Midwest regional. They were upset 69–67 by twelve-seed McNeese in the First Round. The Tigers mounted a comeback after being down 31–13 at halftime of the game, but they fell just short.

== Previous season ==
The Tigers finished the season 24–12 and 11–9 in ACC play to finish in a three-way tie for fifth place. As the sixth seed in the ACC tournament, were defeated by Boston College in the Second Round. They earned an at-large bid to the NCAA tournament and were placed as the sixth seed in the West region. They defeated eleventh seed New Mexico in the First Round, third seed Baylor in the Second Round and second seed Arizona in the Sweet Sixteen. This advanced Clemson to only their second Elite Eight in program history. In the Elite Eight the Tigers lost in a rematch of an early season game against Alabama 89–82 to end their season. After the season, Ian Schieffelin was named ACC Most Improved Player, becoming the second Clemson player to win the award. PJ Hall was named to the All-ACC First Team.

== Offseason ==
=== Departures ===
Clemson Departures
Name	Number	Pos.	Height	Weight	Year	Hometown	Reason for departure
Josh Beadle	0	G	6'3.5"	180	Sophomore	Columbia, South Carolina	Transferred to Boston College
Jack Clark	5	F	6'10"	207	Graduate Student	Cheltenham, Pennsylvania	Transferred to VCU
RJ Godfrey	10	F	6'8"	228	Sophomore	Suwanee, Georgia	Transferred to Georgia
Joseph Girard III	11	G	6'2"	189	Graduate Student	Glens Falls, New York	Graduated
Alex Hemenway	12	G	6'4"	192	Graduate Student	Newburgh, Indiana	Transferred to Vanderbilt
PJ Hall	24	C	6'10.5"	238	Senior	Spartanburg, South Carolina	Graduated; signed two-way contract with Denver Nuggets
Bas Leyte	33	F	6'10.5"	225	Graduate Student	Bergen op Zoom, Netherlands	Graduated

=== Incoming transfers ===
Clemson incoming transfers
Name	Number	Pos.	Height	Weight	Year	Hometown	Previous school
Viktor Lakhin	0	C	6'11"	240	(redshirt) Senior	Anapa, Russia	Cincinnati
Myles Foster	6	F	6'7"	235	Graduate Student	Brooklyn, New York	Illinois State
Jaeden Zackery	11	G	6'2"	220	Graduate Student	Salem, Wisconsin	Boston College
Christian Reeves	14	C	7'1"	261	(redshirt) Sophomore	Charlotte, North Carolina	Duke

=== 2024 recruiting class ===
College recruiting information (2024)
Name	Hometown	School	Height	Weight	Commit date
Ace Buckner; PG	Cleveland, OH	La Lumiere School	6 ft 1 in (1.85 m)	165 lb (75 kg)	Oct 20, 2023
Ace Buckner; PG	Recruit ratings: Rivals: 247Sports: ESPN: (79)				
Del Jones; PG	Castaic, CA	Southern California Academy	6 ft 3 in (1.91 m)	170 lb (77 kg)	Oct 23, 2023
Del Jones; PG	Recruit ratings: Rivals: 247Sports: ESPN: (80)				
Dallas Thomas; SF	Little Rock, AR	Parkview Arts and Science Magnet High School	6 ft 7 in (2.01 m)	190 lb (86 kg)	Jul 11, 2023
Dallas Thomas; SF	Recruit ratings: Rivals: 247Sports: ESPN: (83)				
Overall recruit ranking:
Note: In many cases, Scout, Rivals, 247Sports, On3, and ESPN may conflict in their listings of height and weight.; In these cases, the average was taken. ESPN grades are on a 100-point scale.; Sources: "2024 Clemson Basketball Commitment List". Rivals.; "Clemson Tigers". ESPN.; "2024 Team Ranking". Rivals.

== Roster ==
2024–25 Clemson Tigers men's basketball team
Players
Coaches

Pos.	#	Name	Height	Weight	Year	Hometown
C	0	Viktor Lakhin	6 ft 11 in (2.11 m)	245 lb (111 kg)	RS Sr	Anapa, Russia
G	1	Chase Hunter	6 ft 4 in (1.93 m)	202 lb (92 kg)	GS	Atlanta, Georgia
G	2	Dillon Hunter	6 ft 3 in (1.91 m)	192 lb (87 kg)	Jr	Atlanta, Georgia
G	3	Jake Heidbreder	6 ft 5 in (1.96 m)	180 lb (82 kg)	RS Jr	Floyds Knobs, Indiana
F	4	Ian Schieffelin	6 ft 8 in (2.03 m)	240 lb (109 kg)	Sr	Loganville, Georgia
F	5	Asa Thomas	6 ft 7 in (2.01 m)	200 lb (91 kg)	RS Fr	Lake Forest, Illinois
F	6	Myles Foster	6 ft 7 in (2.01 m)	245 lb (111 kg)	GS	Brooklyn, New York
F	7	Chauncey Wiggins	6 ft 10 in (2.08 m)	216 lb (98 kg)	Jr	Covington, Georgia
F	8	Dallas Thomas (redshirt)	6 ft 9 in (2.06 m)	180 lb (82 kg)	Fr	Little Rock, Arkansas
G	10	Del Jones	6 ft 2 in (1.88 m)	187 lb (85 kg)	Fr	Landover, Maryland
G	11	Jaeden Zackery	6 ft 1 in (1.85 m)	218 lb (99 kg)	GS	Salem, Wisconsin
G	13	Andrew Latiff (W)	6 ft 5 in (1.96 m)	195 lb (88 kg)	Sr	Clemson, South Carolina
C	14	Christian Reeves	7 ft 2 in (2.18 m)	253 lb (115 kg)	RS So	Charlotte, North Carolina
G	20	Matt Kelly (W)	6 ft 2 in (1.88 m)	175 lb (79 kg)	So	Charleston, South Carolina
G	21	Ace Buckner (redshirt)	6 ft 3 in (1.91 m)	170 lb (77 kg)	Fr	Dallas, Texas
F	32	Daniel Nauseef (W)	6 ft 7 in (2.01 m)	220 lb (100 kg)	Jr	Dayton, Ohio
F/C	35	Jackson Roberts (W)	6 ft 11 in (2.11 m)	247 lb (112 kg)	Jr	Tampa, Florida

Head coach

- Brad Brownell (DePauw)

Assistant coach(es)

- Billy Donlon (UNC Wilmington)
- Sean Dixon (Presbyterian)
- Dick Bender (McDaniel)

Legend

- (C) Team captain
- (S) Suspended
- (I) Ineligible
- (W) Walk-on
- Injured
- Current redshirt

Roster

== Schedule and results ==
Date time, TV	Rank^{#}	Opponent^{#}	Result	Record	High points	High rebounds	High assists	Site (attendance) city, state
Exhibition
October 30, 2024*; 7:00 p.m.		Augusta	W 90–49	–	18 – Wiggins	8 – Reeves	4 – C. Hunter	Littlejohn Coliseum (—); Clemson, SC
Regular season
November 4, 2024*; 7:00 p.m., ACCNX/ESPN+		Charleston Southern	W 94–61	1–0	17 – Tied	9 – Schieffelin	3 – Tied	Littlejohn Coliseum (7,463); Clemson, SC
November 8, 2024*; 7:00 p.m., ACCNX/ESPN+		Saint Francis	W 88–62	2–0	16 – Tied	13 – Schieffelin	6 – Zackery	Littlejohn Coliseum (7,571); Clemson, SC
November 12, 2024*; 7:00 p.m., ACCN		Eastern Kentucky	W 75–62	3–0	19 – Tied	12 – Lakhin	4 – Tied	Littlejohn Coliseum (7,258); Clemson, SC
November 17, 2024*; 1:30 p.m., CBSSN		at Boise State	L 71–84	3–1	30 – C. Hunter	12 – Schieffelin	6 – C. Hunter	ExtraMile Arena (11,275); Boise, ID
November 21, 2024*; 7:00 p.m., ACCNX/ESPN+		Radford; Sunshine Slam campus game	W 79–51	4–1	16 – Wiggins	9 – Schieffelin	3 – Tied	Littlejohn Coliseum (7,166); Clemson, SC
November 25, 2024*; 6:30 p.m., CBSSN		vs. San Francisco; Sunshine Slam Beach Bracket semifinals	W 70–55	5–1	18 – Schieffelin	13 – Schieffelin	5 – Schieffelin	Ocean Center (1,690); Daytona Beach, FL
November 26, 2024*; 4:00 p.m., CBSSN		vs. Penn State; Sunshine Slam Beach Bracket championship	W 75–67	6–1	18 – Schieffelin	13 – Schieffelin	8 – Schieffelin	Ocean Center; Daytona Beach, FL
November 29, 2024*; 7:00 p.m., ACCNX/ESPN+		Florida A&M	W 86–58	7–1	16 – C. Hunter	15 – Schieffelin	4 – Zackery	Littlejohn Coliseum (9,000); Clemson, SC
December 3, 2024*; 9:30 p.m., ESPN		No. 4 Kentucky; ACC–SEC Challenge	W 70–66	8–1	13 – Zackery	20 – Schieffelin	4 – Schieffelin	Littlejohn Coliseum (9,000); Clemson, SC
December 7, 2024; 12:00 p.m., ESPN2		at Miami (FL)	W 65–55	9–1 (1–0)	18 – C. Hunter	12 – Schieffelin	4 – Zackery	Watsco Center (5,582); Coral Gables, FL
December 14, 2024*; 11:00 a.m., ESPN2	No. 16	Memphis	L 82–87 ^{OT}	9–2	23 – Lakhin	11 – Lakhin	5 – D. Hunter	Littlejohn Coliseum (8,148); Clemson, SC
December 17, 2024*; 7:00 p.m., SECN	No. 25	at South Carolina; Rivalry	L 88–91 ^{OT}	9–3	27 – C. Hunter	12 – Schieffelin	3 – Tied	Colonial Life Arena (12,780); Columbia, SC
December 21, 2024; 2:30 p.m., ESPN	No. 25	Wake Forest	W 73–62	10–3 (2–0)	16 – C. Hunter	9 – Lakhin	6 – Tied	Littlejohn Coliseum (6,889); Clemson, SC
January 1, 2025; 4:00 p.m., ACCN		Stanford	W 85–71	11–3 (3–0)	22 – C. Hunter	7 – Lakhin	6 – Zackery	Littlejohn Coliseum (8,337); Clemson, SC
January 4, 2025; 8:30 p.m., ESPN2		California	W 80–68	12–3 (4–0)	21 – Schieffelin	7 – Schieffelin	6 – C. Hunter	Littlejohn Coliseum (7,660); Clemson, SC
January 7, 2025; 7:00 p.m., ESPNU		at Louisville	L 64–74	12–4 (4–1)	15 – C. Hunter	10 – Schieffelin	3 – C. Hunter	KFC Yum! Center (14,991); Louisville, KY
January 11, 2025; 2:00 p.m., ACCN		Florida State	W 77–57	13–4 (5–1)	25 – C. Hunter	6 – Lakhin	6 – Schieffelin	Littlejohn Coliseum (9,341); Clemson, SC
January 14, 2025; 9:00 p.m., ACCN		at Georgia Tech	W 70–59	14–4 (6–1)	21 – Zackery	7 – Schieffelin	6 – Schieffelin	McCamish Pavilion (4,047); Atlanta, GA
January 18, 2025; 12:00 p.m., The CW		at Pittsburgh	W 78–75 ^{OT}	15–4 (7–1)	20 – C. Hunter	11 – Schieffelin	6 – D. Hunter	Petersen Events Center (10,584); Pittsburgh, PA
January 22, 2025; 7:00 p.m., ACCN		Syracuse	W 86–72	16–4 (8–1)	23 – C. Hunter	10 – Lakhin	5 – Zackery	Littlejohn Coliseum (9,000); Clemson, SC
January 25, 2025; 5:00 p.m., ACCN		at Virginia Tech	W 72–57	17–4 (9–1)	16 – Wiggins	7 – Schieffelin	4 – Zackery	Cassell Coliseum (8,925); Blacksburg, VA
February 1, 2025; 1:30 p.m., The CW		at NC State	W 68–58	18–4 (10–1)	20 – C. Hunter	11 – Lakhin	4 – Zackery	Lenovo Center (15,299); Raleigh, NC
February 4, 2025; 9:00 p.m., ACCN		Georgia Tech	L 86–89 ^{3OT}	18–5 (10–2)	28 – C. Hunter	8 – Schieffelin	4 – C. Hunter	Littlejohn Coliseum (7,913); Clemson, SC
February 8, 2025; 6:30 p.m., ESPN		No. 2 Duke	W 77–71	19–5 (11–2)	22 – Lakhin	10 – Schieffelin	3 – C. Hunter	Littlejohn Coliseum (9,000); Clemson, SC
February 10, 2025; 7:00 p.m., ESPN	No. 23	North Carolina	W 85–65	20–5 (12–2)	22 – Lakhin	10 – Schieffelin	7 – Zackery	Littlejohn Coliseum (8,704); Clemson, SC
February 15, 2025; 12:00 p.m., The CW	No. 23	at Florida State	W 72–46	21–5 (13–2)	17 – D. Hunter	12 – Schieffelin	4 – D. Hunter	Donald L. Tucker Civic Center (6,278); Tallahassee, FL
February 22, 2025; 4:00 p.m., ACCN	No. 18	at SMU	W 79–69	22–5 (14–2)	19 – Zackery	6 – Tied	7 – Tied	Moody Coliseum (7,054); Dallas, TX
February 26, 2025; 7:00 p.m., ACCN	No. 13	Notre Dame	W 83–68	23–5 (15–2)	24 – Schieffelin	9 – Schieffelin	5 – Tied	Littlejohn Coliseum (8,761); Clemson, SC
March 1, 2025; 12:00 p.m., ESPN2	No. 13	at Virginia	W 71–58	24–5 (16–2)	21 – Schieffelin	13 – Schieffelin	5 – Lakhin	John Paul Jones Arena (13,992); Charlottesville, VA
March 5, 2025; 7:00 p.m., ESPNU	No. 11	at Boston College	W 78–69	25–5 (17–2)	21 – Zackery	13 – Lakhin	3 – C. Hunter	Conte Forum (4,362); Chestnut Hill, MA
March 8, 2025; 6:00 p.m., ESPNU	No. 11	Virginia Tech	W 65–47	26–5 (18–2)	16 – Lakhin	7 – Tied	4 – Zackery	Littlejohn Coliseum (9,000); Clemson, SC
ACC tournament
March 13, 2025; 9:30 p.m., ESPN2	(3) No. 10	vs. (6) SMU; Quarterfinals	W 57–54	27–5	21 – C. Hunter	12 – Schiefflin	2 – Tied	Spectrum Center (10,627); Charlotte, NC
March 14, 2025; 9:30 p.m., ESPN	(3) No. 10	vs. (2) No. 13 Louisville; Semifinals	L 73–76	27–6	23 – C. Hunter	12 – Schieffelin	3 – Zackery	Spectrum Center (18,116); Charlotte, NC
NCAA tournament
March 20, 2025; 3:15 p.m., TruTV	(5 MW) No. 12	vs. (12 MW) McNeese; First round	L 67–69	27–7	24 – Zackery	10 – Lakhin	2 – Tied	Amica Mutual Pavilion (11,441); Providence, RI
*Non-conference game. ^{#}Rankings from AP poll. (#) Tournament seedings in parentheses. MW=Midwest. All times are in Eastern Time.

== Rankings ==
Ranking movements Legend: ██ Increase in ranking ██ Decrease in ranking — = Not ranked RV = Received votes
	Week																				
Poll	Pre	1	2	3	4	5	6	7	8	9	10	11	12	13	14	15	16	17	18	19	Final
AP	RV	RV	RV	—	RV	16	25	RV	RV	RV	RV	RV	RV	RV	23	18	13	11	10	12	22
Coaches	RV	RV	—	—	RV	16	RV	RV	RV	RV	RV	RV	25	21	19	17	14	11	10	13	23

== Statistics ==
Player	GP	GS	MPG	FG%	3P%	FT%	RPG	APG	PPG
Chase Hunter	34	33	33.5	47.0%	40.7%	86.6%	3.0	2.5	16.5
Ian Schieffelin	34	34	33.4	49.5%	34.1%	74.1%	9.4	2.7	12.4
Jaeden Zackery	34	34	35.5	45.3%	36.0%	82.2%	3.3	3.1	11.7
Viktor Lakhin	34	33	23.6	50.7%	37.5%	69.6%	6.4	1.5	11.4
Chauncey Wiggins	34	26	22.6	43.8%	36.5%	80.6%	2.9	0.7	8.3
Dillon Hunter	30	9	22.6	40.4%	31.2%	61.5%	2.5	1.9	5.4
Jake Heidbreder	32	0	14.0	40.4%	37.3%	100%	1.2	0.8	4.1
Del Jones	32	0	11.8	40.3%	31.1%	76.5%	1.5	1.0	3.8
Myles Foster	28	0	5.9	56.1%	57.1%	54.2%	1.5	0.1	2.3
Christian Reeves	29	1	5.0	50.0%	—	75.0%	1.5	0.2	1.2
Asa Thomas	12	0	2.3	40.0%	50.0%	66.7%	0.2	0.2	1.2
Matt Kelly	6	0	1.2	50.0%	50.0%	—	0.3	—	0.5
Daniel Nauseef	7	0	1.0	0.0%	—	50.0%	—	0.1	0.1
Andrew Latiff	6	0	1.2	—	—	—	—	—	0.0
Jackson Roberts	4	0	1.0	0.0%	—	—	0.3	—	0.0
