= 2024–25 Miami Hurricanes men's basketball team =

American college basketball season

2024–25 Miami Hurricanes men's basketball
- Conference: Atlantic Coast Conference
- Record: 7–24 (3–17 ACC)
- Head coach: Jim Larrañaga (14th season; first 12 games); Bill Courtney (interim, rest of season)
- Assistant coaches: D.J. Irving; Kotie Kimble
- Home arena: Watsco Center

2024–25 ACC men's basketball standings
	Conf.				Overall
Team	W		L	PCT	W		L	PCT
No. 3 Duke †	19	–	1	.950	35	–	4	.897
No. 21 Louisville	18	–	2	.900	27	–	8	.771
No. 22 Clemson	18	–	2	.900	27	–	7	.794
Wake Forest	13	–	7	.650	21	–	11	.656
North Carolina	13	–	7	.650	23	–	14	.622
SMU	13	–	7	.650	24	–	11	.686
Stanford	11	–	9	.550	21	–	14	.600
Georgia Tech	10	–	10	.500	17	–	17	.500
Virginia	8	–	12	.400	15	–	17	.469
Virginia Tech	8	–	12	.400	13	–	19	.406
Florida State	8	–	12	.400	17	–	15	.531
Notre Dame	8	–	12	.400	15	–	18	.455
Pittsburgh	8	–	12	.400	17	–	15	.531
Syracuse	7	–	13	.350	14	–	19	.424
California	6	–	14	.300	14	–	19	.424
NC State	5	–	15	.250	12	–	19	.387
Boston College	4	–	16	.200	12	–	19	.387
Miami (FL)	3	–	17	.150	7	–	24	.226
† 2025 ACC tournament winner Rankings from AP poll

The 2024–25 Miami Hurricanes men's basketball team represented the University of Miami during the 2024–25 NCAA Division I men's basketball season. The Hurricanes were led by fourteenth-year head coach Jim Larrañaga, and played their home games at the Watsco Center on the university's campus in Coral Gables, Florida as members of the Atlantic Coast Conference (ACC).

On December 26, head coach Jim Larrañaga announced his retirement. Bill Courtney was named the interim head coach for the remainder of the season.

The Hurricanes started their season with three straight victories over non-Power 4 opponents before traveling to participate in the Charleston Classic. They lost to Drake in the quarterfinals 80–69 to move to the consolation bracket. There they lost to Oklahoma State 80–74, and to VCU 77–70 to finish in eighth place. Their woes continued as they lost to Charleston Southern by four points and were defeated in the ACC–SEC Challenge by Arkansas by three points. They lost their ACC opener to Clemson 65–55. They then participated in the Jimmy V Classic, where they lost to top-ranked Tennessee 75–62. Their seven-game losing streak was broken with a win against Presbyterian 94–75. However, their winning streak was short-lived, as they lost to Mount St. Mary's in overtime 78–74, in what would be Jim Larrañaga's final game. The coaching change did not improve their fortunes, as the Hurricanes went on an eight-game losing streak under new coach Bill Courtney. The streak included a one point loss at Virginia Tech, a fifteen-point loss to rival Florida State, and a fourpoint overtime loss at California. The streak was broken on February 1, with a 63–57 defeat of Notre Dame. After an eleven-point loss at Louisville, the Hurricanes won their second ACC game of the season 91–84 over Syracuse. However, from there they went on a six-game losing streak, which included a loss to second ranked Duke. They finished the season with a 72–70 win over NC State.

The Hurricanes finished the season 7–24 and 3–17 in ACC play to finish in eighteenth place. Under the new ACC tournament rules, they did not qualify for the 2025 ACC tournament. They were not invited to the NCAA tournament or the NIT.

== Previous season ==
The Hurricanes finished the 2023–24 season a disappointing 15–17 and 6–14 in ACC play to finish in fourteenth place. As the fourteenth seed in the ACC tournament, they lost to eleventh seed Boston College in the first round. They were not invited to the NCAA tournament or the NIT. This ended a streak of two straight post-season appearances for the Hurricanes.

== Offseason ==
=== Departures ===
Departures
Name	Number	Pos.	Height	Weight	Year	Hometown	Reason for departure
Michael Nwoko	1	C	6'10"	245	Freshman	Toronto, Canada	Transferred to Mississippi State
Christian Watson	3	G	6'7"	211	Sophomore	Lanham, Maryland	Transferred to Southern Miss
Bensley Joseph	4	G	6'2"	196	Junior	Arlington, Massachusetts	Transferred to Providence
Wooga Poplar	5	G	6'5"	197	Junior	Philadelphia, Pennsylvania	Transferred to Villanova
Kyshawn George	7	G	6'8"	205	Freshman	Monthey, Switzerland	Selected 24th overall in the 2024 NBA draft
Nick Cassano	11	F	6'7"	228	Freshman	Naples, Florida	Entered transfer portal
Jakai Robinson	13	G	6'5"	208	(redshirt) Sophomore	Ossining, New York	Transferred to Bryant
Norchad Omier	15	F	6'7"	240	(redshirt) Junior	Bluefields, Nicaragua	Transferred to Baylor
AJ Casey	23	F	6'9"	221	Sophomore	Indianapolis, Indiana	Transferred to Saint Louis

=== Incoming transfers ===
Incoming transfers
Name	Number	Pos.	Height	Weight	Year	Hometown	Previous school
Lynn Kidd	1	C	6'10"	235	Graduate student	Gainesville, Florida	Virginia Tech
Brandon Johnson	2	F	6'8"	210	Graduate student	Raleigh, North Carolina	East Carolina
Jalen Blackmon	5	G	6'3"	180	Graduate student	Marion, Indiana	Stetson
AJ Staton-McCray	11	G	6'5"	195	(redshirt) Junior	Delray Beach, Florida	Samford
Kiree Huie	15	G	6'9"	220	Senior	Grayson, Georgia	Idaho State
Yussif Basa-Ama	35	F	6'8"	195	Graduate student	Bolgatanga, Ghana	Yale

=== 2024 recruiting class ===
College recruiting
Name	Hometown	School	Height	Weight	Commit date
Jalil Bethea; G	Philadelphia, Pennsylvania	Archbishop Wood	6 ft 4 in (1.93 m)	170 lb (77 kg)	Sep 20, 2024
Jalil Bethea; G	Recruit ratings: Rivals: 247Sports: ESPN: (92)				
Isaiah Johnson-Arigu; F	Minneapolis, Minnesota	Totino-Grace	6 ft 7 in (2.01 m)	200 lb (91 kg)	Sep 16, 2023
Isaiah Johnson-Arigu; F	Recruit ratings: Rivals: 247Sports: ESPN: (82)				
Austin Swartz; G	Concord, North Carolina	Cannon School	6 ft 4 in (1.93 m)	185 lb (84 kg)	Sep 5, 2023
Austin Swartz; G	Recruit ratings: Rivals: 247Sports: ESPN: (87)				
Divine Ugochukwu; G	Sugar Land, Texas	Clements	6 ft 3 in (1.91 m)	180 lb (82 kg)	May 11, 2024
Divine Ugochukwu; G	Recruit ratings: Rivals: 247Sports: ESPN: (79)				
Overall recruit ranking: Rivals: 12
Note: In many cases, Scout, Rivals, 247Sports, On3, and ESPN may conflict in their listings of height and weight.; In these cases, the average was taken. ESPN grades are on a 100-point scale.; Sources: "Miami 2024 Basketball Commitments". Rivals.; "Miami Hurricanes". ESPN.; "2024 Team Ranking". Rivals.

== Roster ==
2024–25 Miami Hurricanes men's basketball team
Players
Coaches

Pos.	#	Name	Height	Weight	Year	Previous school	Hometown
G	0	Matthew Cleveland	6 ft 7 in (2.01 m)	200 lb (91 kg)	Sr	Pace Academy; Florida State	Atlanta, GA
C	1	Lynn Kidd	6 ft 10 in (2.08 m)	235 lb (107 kg)	GS	IMG Academy; Virginia Tech	Gainesvlle, FL
F	2	Brandon Johnson	6 ft 8 in (2.03 m)	210 lb (95 kg)	GS	Rolesville; East Carolina	Raleigh, NC
G	3	Jalil Bethea	6 ft 4 in (1.93 m)	170 lb (77 kg)	Fr	Archbishop Wood	Philadelphia, PA
F	4	Isaiah Johnson-Arigu	6 ft 7 in (2.01 m)	200 lb (91 kg)	Fr	Totino-Grace	Minneapolis, MN
G	5	Jalen Blackmon	6 ft 3 in (1.91 m)	180 lb (82 kg)	GS	Marion; Stetson	Marion, IN
G	10	Paul Djobet	6 ft 7 in (2.01 m)	195 lb (88 kg)	So	West Oaks Academy (FL)	Lille, France
G	11	A.J. Staton-McCray	6 ft 5 in (1.96 m)	195 lb (88 kg)	RS Jr	West Oaks Academy (FL); Samford	Delray Beach, FL
F	15	Kiree Huie	6 ft 9 in (2.06 m)	220 lb (100 kg)	Sr	Grayson; Idaho State	Grayson, GA
G	23	Austin Swartz	6 ft 4 in (1.93 m)	185 lb (84 kg)	Fr	Cannon School	Concord, NC
G	24	Nijel Pack	6 ft 0 in (1.83 m)	185 lb (84 kg)	RS Sr	Larence Central; Kansas State	Indianapolis, IN
G	35	Yussif Basa-Ama	6 ft 8 in (2.03 m)	195 lb (88 kg)	GS	Saint Andrew's; Yale	Bolgatanga, Ghana
G	99	Divine Ugochukwu	6 ft 3 in (1.91 m)	180 lb (82 kg)	Fr	Clements	Sugar Land, TX

Head coach

- Jim Larrañaga (Providence)

Assistant coach(es)

- Bill Courtney (Bucknell)
- D.J. Irving (Boston University)
- Kotie Kimble (Coastal Carolina)

Legend

- (C) Team captain
- (S) Suspended
- (I) Ineligible
- (W) Walk-on
- Injured
- Current redshirt

Roster
Last update: August 6, 2024

== Schedule and results ==
Date time, TV	Rank^{#}	Opponent^{#}	Result	Record	High points	High rebounds	High assists	Site (attendance) city, state
Exhibition
October 30, 2024*; 7:00 p.m., ACCNX/ESPN+		Saint Leo	W 94–61	–	18 – Pack	12 – Johnson	5 – Pack	Watsco Center (1,242); Coral Gables, FL
Regular season
November 4, 2024*; 7:00 p.m., ACCNX/ESPN+		Fairleigh Dickinson	W 113–72	1–0	24 – Kidd	9 – Tied	5 – Pack	Watsco Center (5,550); Coral Gables, FL
November 10, 2024*; 2:00 p.m., ACCNX/ESPN+		Binghamton	W 88–64	2–0	17 – Tied	11 – Cleveland	6 – Pack	Watsco Center (5,701); Coral Gables, FL
November 17, 2024*; 2:00 p.m., ACCNX/ESPN+		Coppin State	W 93–63	3–0	15 – Cleveland	8 – Johnson	9 – Pack	Watsco Center (5,361); Coral Gables, FL
November 21, 2024*; 12:00 p.m., ESPN2		vs. Drake; Charleston Classic quarterfinals	L 69–80	3–1	17 – Pack	7 – Johnson	5 – Pack	TD Arena (1,818); Charleston, SC
November 22, 2024*; 2:00 p.m., ESPNU		vs. Oklahoma State; Charleston Classic Consolation 2nd round	L 74–80	3–2	20 – Pack	10 – Johnson	4 – Blackmon	TD Arena (1,936); Charleston, SC
November 24, 2024*; 12:30 p.m., ESPN+		vs. VCU; Charleston Classic 7th place game	L 70–77	3–3	14 – Kidd	12 – Johnson	3 – Tied	TD Arena (2,119); Charleston, SC
November 30, 2024*; 2:00 p.m., ACCNX/ESPN+		Charleston Southern	L 79–83	3–4	23 – Johnson	8 – Johnson	4 – Tied	Watsco Center (3,244); Coral Gables, FL
December 3, 2024*; 7:00 p.m., ESPN2		Arkansas; ACC–SEC Challenge	L 73–76	3–5	22 – Pack	10 – Cleveland	6 – Pack	Watsco Center (6,389); Coral Gables, FL
December 7, 2024; 12:00 p.m., ESPN2		Clemson	L 55–65	3–6 (0–1)	12 – Bethea	8 – Tied	3 – Pack	Watsco Center (5,582); Coral Gables, FL
December 10, 2024*; 6:30 p.m., ESPN		vs. No. 1 Tennessee; Jimmy V Classic	L 62–75	3–7	14 – Kidd	12 – Kidd	4 – Staton-McCray	Madison Square Garden; New York, NY
December 15, 2024*; 2:00 p.m., ACCNX/ESPN+		Presbyterian	W 94–75	4–7	24 – Cleveland	11 – Kidd	6 – Kidd	Watsco Center (5,214); Coral Gables, FL
December 21, 2024*; 2:00 p.m., ACCNX/ESPN+		Mount St. Mary's	L 74–78 ^{OT}	4–8	19 – Cleveland	13 – Kidd	3 – Tied	Watsco Center (5,539); Coral Gables, FL
January 1, 2025; 12:00 p.m., ACCN		at Boston College	L 68–78	4–9 (0–2)	21 – Cleveland	8 – Tied	3 – Kidd	Conte Forum (5,035); Chestnut Hill, MA
January 4, 2025; 2:00 p.m., ACCN		at Virginia Tech	L 85–86	4–10 (0–3)	21 – Cleveland	8 – Kidd	7 – Ugochukwu	Cassell Coliseum (8,925); Blacksburg, VA
January 8, 2025; 7:00 p.m., ACCN		Florida State	L 65–80	4–11 (0–4)	16 – Cleveland	7 – Tied	3 – Blackmon	Watsco Center (6,597); Coral Gables, FL
January 11, 2025; 5:15 p.m., The CW		Wake Forest	L 78–88	4–12 (0–5)	22 – Cleveland	13 – Johnson	5 – Staton-McCray	Watsco Center (6,420); Coral Gables, FL
January 14, 2025; 9:00 p.m., ESPN		at No. 3 Duke	L 54–89	4–13 (0–6)	20 – Kidd	7 – Johnson	5 – Johnson	Cameron Indoor Stadium (9,314); Durham, NC
January 18, 2025; 2:00 p.m., ESPNU		SMU	L 74–117	4–14 (0–7)	31 – Cleveland	5 – Kidd	3 – Johnson	Watsco Center (3,922); Coral Gables, FL
January 22, 2025; 11:00 p.m., ESPNU		at Stanford	L 51–88	4–15 (0–8)	23 – Cleveland	7 – Tied	2 – Ugochukwu	Maples Pavilion (2,950); Stanford, CA
January 25, 2025; 8:30 pm, ESPNU		at California	L 94–98 ^{OT}	4–16 (0–9)	30 – Cleveland	8 – Tied	5 – Bethea	Haas Pavilion (5,169); Berkeley, CA
January 29, 2025; 7:00 p.m., ESPNU		Virginia	L 71–82	4–17 (0–10)	27 – Cleveland	7 – Johnson	4 – Ugochukwu	Watsco Center (5,509); Coral Gables, FL
February 1, 2025; 8:00 p.m., ESPN2		Notre Dame	W 63–57	5–17 (1–10)	21 – Cleveland	8 – Johnson	4 – Ugochukwu	Watsco Center (3,649); Coral Gables, FL
February 8, 2025; 2:00 pm, ESPN2		at Louisville	L 78–88	5–18 (1–11)	22 – Staton-McCray	11 – Kidd	2 – Tied	KFC Yum! Center (15,588); Louisville, KY
February 11, 2025; 7:00 p.m., ACCN		Syracuse	W 91–84	6–18 (2–11)	32 – Cleveland	6 – Bethea	5 – Cleveland	Watsco Center (5,752); Coral Gables, FL
February 15, 2025; 12:00 p.m., ESPN2		at Pittsburgh	L 65–74	6–19 (2–12)	16 – Kidd	15 – Kidd	4 – Cleveland	Petersen Events Center (8,578); Pittsburgh, PA
February 19, 2025; 9:00 p.m., ACCN		at Florida State	L 66–74	6–20 (2–13)	14 – Tied	11 – Kidd	6 – Ugochukwu	Donald L. Tucker Center (7,565); Tallahassee, FL
February 22, 2025; 6:00 p.m., ACCN		Virginia Tech	L 68–81	6–21 (2–14)	16 – Kidd	9 – Kidd	4 – Tied	Watsco Center (5,290); Coral Gables, FL
February 25, 2025; 7:00 p.m., ESPN		No. 2 Duke	L 60–97	6–22 (2–15)	17 – Kidd	10 – Ugochukwu	3 – Johnson	Watsco Center (7,801); Coral Gables, FL
March 1, 2025; 12:00 p.m., ESPN		at North Carolina	L 73–92	6–23 (2–16)	25 – Cleveland	7 – Johnson	5 – Cleveland	Dean Smith Center (21,750); Chapel Hill, NC
March 4, 2025; 7:00 p.m., ACCN		at Georgia Tech	L 74–89	6–24 (2–17)	29 – Cleveland	10 – Johnson	4 – Johnson	McCamish Pavilion (4,765); Atlanta, GA
March 8, 2025; 2:15 p.m., The CW		NC State	W 72–70	7–24 (3–17)	32 – Cleveland	10 – Johnson	6 – Ugochukwu	Watsco Center (2,541); Coral Gables, FL
*Non-conference game. ^{#}Rankings from AP Poll. (#) Tournament seedings in parentheses. All times are in Eastern Time.

== Rankings ==
Ranking movements Legend: ██ Increase in ranking ██ Decrease in ranking — = Not ranked RV = Received votes
	Week																				
Poll	Pre	1	2	3	4	5	6	7	8	9	10	11	12	13	14	15	16	17	18	19	Final
AP	RV	RV	RV	—	—	—	—	—	—	—	—	—	—	—	—	—	—	—	—	—	—
Coaches	—	—	—	—	—	—	—	—	—	—	—	—	—	—	—	—	—	—	—	—	—
