= Faith Heritage School =

Christian school in the United States

Coordinates: 43°00′10″N 76°08′53″W

- 3740 Midland Ave, Syracuse, NY; United States

Information
- Type: Private Preschool, Elementary, and Secondary
- Established: 1972
- Principal: Rebekah MacDougall
- Head of school: Dr. Deborah Samuelson
- Grades: Pre-K through 12
- Colors: royal blue and gold
- Athletics: soccer, volleyball (girls), cross country, basketball (boys), indoor track, outdoor track
- Athletics conference: OHSL Patriot
- Affiliation: ACSI
- Website: Faith Heritage School

Faith Heritage School is a private, non-denominational Christian, K-12 school in Syracuse, New York that was established in 1972. As of the 2003–2004 school year, its total enrollment was 557, with a student-to-teacher ratio of 14.3, according to NCES figures provided by the United States Department of Education. Figures reported by Syracuse's Post-Standard indicate that the school's enrollment for the 2006–2007 school year was down to 375 and that its executive director, Jeff Shaver, was spearheading an effort to increase enrollment, improve the school's financial aid offerings, and raise donations to fill the nearly 20% expected gap between tuition and expenditures in the school's $2.1 million budget.
