= 2024–25 Atlantic Coast Conference men's basketball season =

- League: NCAA Division I
- Sport: Basketball
- Duration: November 3, 2024 – March 8, 2025
- Teams: 18
- TV partner(s): ACC Network, ESPN, The CW Sports

NBA Draft
- Top draft pick: Cooper Flagg, Duke
- Picked by: Dallas Mavericks, 1st overall

2024–25 NCAA Division I men's basketball season
- Season champions: Duke
- Runners-up: Louisville; Clemson
- Season MVP: Cooper Flagg – Duke
- Top scorer: Markus Burton – 22.17 ppg

ACC tournament
- Champions: Duke
- Finals MVP: Kon Knueppel – Duke

Atlantic Coast Conference men's basketball seasons
- ← 2023–24 2025–26 →

2024–25 ACC men's basketball standings
	Conf.				Overall
Team	W		L	PCT	W		L	PCT
No. 3 Duke †	19	–	1	.950	35	–	4	.897
No. 21 Louisville	18	–	2	.900	27	–	8	.771
No. 22 Clemson	18	–	2	.900	27	–	7	.794
Wake Forest	13	–	7	.650	21	–	11	.656
North Carolina	13	–	7	.650	23	–	14	.622
SMU	13	–	7	.650	24	–	11	.686
Stanford	11	–	9	.550	21	–	14	.600
Georgia Tech	10	–	10	.500	17	–	17	.500
Virginia	8	–	12	.400	15	–	17	.469
Virginia Tech	8	–	12	.400	13	–	19	.406
Florida State	8	–	12	.400	17	–	15	.531
Notre Dame	8	–	12	.400	15	–	18	.455
Pittsburgh	8	–	12	.400	17	–	15	.531
Syracuse	7	–	13	.350	14	–	19	.424
California	6	–	14	.300	14	–	19	.424
NC State	5	–	15	.250	12	–	19	.387
Boston College	4	–	16	.200	12	–	19	.387
Miami (FL)	3	–	17	.150	7	–	24	.226
† 2025 ACC tournament winner Rankings from AP poll

The 2024–25 Atlantic Coast Conference men's basketball season began with practices in October 2024, followed by the start of the 2024–25 NCAA Division I men's basketball season in November. Conference play started in December 2024 and concluded in March 2025. The 2025 ACC men's basketball tournament was held at the Spectrum Center in Charlotte, North Carolina, in March 2025. This was the 71st season of Atlantic Coast Conference basketball and the first season in which 18 teams competed in the conference, after the additions of California, SMU, and Stanford on July 1, 2024. The top 15 teams from regular season play earned postseason bids to the 2025 ACC men's basketball tournament.

The Duke Blue Devils finished as regular season champions with a 19–1 conference record. They finished one game ahead of Clemson and Louisville who were both 18–2. They title was Duke's twenty-first overall. Duke also went on to win the ACC tournament over Louisville. It was their twenty-third tournament title, which is the most in conference history. Four ACC teams qualified for the NCAA tournament and they finished with a 5–4 overall record. Duke made it the furthest out of any of the teams, reaching the Final Four.

== Head coaches ==
=== Coaching changes ===
- On March 13, 2024, the Louisville Cardinals fired head coach Kenny Payne. The Cardinals hired Pat Kelsey as his replacement on March 28, 2024.
- On March 21, 2024, the SMU Mustangs fired head coach Rob Lanier after two seasons. On April 1, the school named USC head coach Andy Enfield the team's new head coach.
- On March 14, 2024, the Stanford Cardinal fired head coach Jerod Haase after eight seasons. Kyle Smith was hired as his replacement from Washington State on March 25, 2024.
- On October 17, 2024, former Virginia coach Tony Bennett announced his retirement effective immediately after 15 seasons. Assistant coach Ron Sanchez was named as the replacement.
- On December 26, 2024, Jim Larrañaga announced his retirement after starting the season 4–8. Larrañaga was in his fourteenth season as head coach. Bill Courtney was named interim head coach for the remainder of the season on the same day.

=== Coaches ===
Team	Head coach	Previous job	Years at school	Record at school	ACC record	ACC titles	NCAA tournaments	NCAA Final Fours	NCAA Championships
Boston College	Earl Grant	Charleston	4	49–53	23–37	0	0	0	0
California	Mark Madsen	Utah Valley	2	13–19	0–0	0	0	0	0
Clemson	Brad Brownell	Wright State	15	265–189	128–126	0	4	0	0
Duke	Jon Scheyer	Duke (Assoc.)	3	54–18	29–11	1	2	0	0
Florida State	Leonard Hamilton	Washington Wizards	23	443–281	203–178	1	11	0	0
Georgia Tech	Damon Stoudamire	Boston Celtics (Asst.)	2	14–18	7–13	0	0	0	0
Louisville	Pat Kelsey	Charleston	1	0–0	0–0	0	0	0	0
Miami	Jim Larrañaga	George Mason	14	270–166	126–115	1	6	2	0
NC State	Kevin Keatts	UNC Wilmington	8	139–94	64–69	1	3	1	0
North Carolina	Hubert Davis	North Carolina (Asst.)	4	78–31	43–17	0	2	1	0
Notre Dame	Micah Shrewsberry	Penn State	2	13–20	7–13	0	0	0	0
Pittsburgh	Jeff Capel	Duke (Asst.)	7	97–92	47–67	0	1	0	0
SMU	Andy Enfield	USC	1	0–0	0–0	0	0	0	0
Stanford	Kyle Smith	Washington State	1	0–0	0–0	0	0	0	0
Syracuse	Adrian Autry	Syracuse (Assoc.)	2	20–12	11–9	0	0	0	0
Virginia	Ron Sanchez	Virginia (Assoc.)	1	0–0	0–0	0	0	0	0
Virginia Tech	Mike Young	Wofford	6	92–66	45–48	1	2	0	0
Wake Forest	Steve Forbes	East Tennessee State	5	71–54	37–41	0	0	0	0

Notes:

- Year at school includes 2024–25 season.
- Overall and ACC records are from the time at current school and are through the end of the 2023–24 season.
- NCAA tournament appearances are from the time at current school only.
- NCAA Final Fours and championship include time at other schools

== Preseason ==
=== Recruiting classes ===
Rankings
Team	247 Sports	On3Recruits	Rivals	Commits
Boston College	59	90	81	3
California	126	113	98	2
Clemson	25	35	33	3
Duke	1	1	1	6
Florida State	21	54	16	5
Georgia Tech	20	25	18	3
Louisville	86	28	59	1
Miami	7	11	12	4
NC State	46	32	31	2
North Carolina	8	5	7	3
Notre Dame	26	36	28	3
Pittsburgh	66	62	70	2
SMU	68	91	NR	3
Stanford	70	101	53	4
Syracuse	33	10	22	2
Virginia	57	53	64	2
Virginia Tech	36	57	60	3
Wake Forest	94	47	80	1

Notes:

- Rankings are up to date as of August 14, 2024.

=== Preseason watchlists ===
	Wooden Award	Naismith	Cousy	West	Erving	Malone	Abdul-Jabbar
Jalil Bethea				✓			
Markus Burton		✓	✓				
Elliot Cadeau			✓				
Matthew Cleveland					✓		
R. J. Davis	✓	✓		✓			
Cooper Flagg	✓	✓			✓		
Donnie Freeman						✓	
Caleb Foster				✓			
Ian Jackson					✓		
Kon Knueppel		✓		✓			
Eddie Lampkin Jr.							✓
Khaman Maluach							✓
Tyrese Proctor	✓		✓				
Drake Powell					✓		
Efton Reid							✓
Maxime Raynaud							✓
Hunter Sallis	✓	✓		✓			
Ian Schieffelin						✓	
Cade Tyson						✓	

=== Preseason polls ===
	AP	Blue Ribbon; Yearbook	CBS Sports	Coaches	ESPN	Fox Sports	KenPom	NCAA Sports	Sports; Illustrated
Boston College	–	–	–	–	–	–	No. 114	–	–
California	–	–	–	–	–	–	No. 135	–	–
Clemson	RV	–	–	RV	–	–	No. 24	–	–
Duke	No. 7	No. 3	No. 9	No. 5	No. 8	No. 7	No. 2	No. 5	No. 5
Florida State	–	–	–	–	–	–	No. 90	–	–
Georgia Tech	–	–	–	–	–	–	No. 70	–	–
Louisville	RV	–	–	–	–	–	No. 64	–	–
Miami	RV	–	–	–	–	–	No. 55	–	–
North Carolina	No. 9	No. 10	No. 4	No. 10	No. 10	No. 10	No. 14	No. 9	No. 11
NC State	–	–	–	–	–	–	No. 52	–	–
Notre Dame	–	–	–	–	–	–	No. 69	–	–
Pittsburgh	–	–	–	–	–	–	No. 38	–	–
SMU	–	–	–	–	–	–	No. 74	–	–
Stanford	–	–	–	–	–	–	No. 99	–	–
Syracuse	–	–	–	–	–	–	No. 68	–	–
Virginia	–	–	–	RV	–	–	No. 78	–	–
Virginia Tech	–	–	–	–	–	–	No. 92	–	–
Wake Forest	RV	–	–	RV	–	–	No. 44	No. 31	–

==== ACC Preseason Media poll ====
The preseason poll and Preseason All-ACC Teams were released on October 15, 2024, prior to the season beginning and after ACC Media Day. The results of the poll are below.

===== Preseason poll =====
	ACC Media	Points
1.	Duke	956 (42)
2.	North Carolina	924 (11)
3.	Wake Forest	800 (1)
4.	Clemson	765
5.	Virginia	743
6.	Miami	659
7.	Pitt	636
8.	NC State	550
9.	Louisville	518
10.	Notre Dame	462
11.	Syracuse	454
12.	Georgia Tech	433
13.	SMU	344
14.	Virginia Tech	252
15.	Florida State	251
16.	California	206
17.	Stanford	165
18.	Boston College	116
Reference: (#) first-place votes

===== Preseason All-ACC teams =====
2024 ACC Men's Basketball Preseason All-ACC Teams
First Team	Second Team
R. J. Davis – North Carolina	Ian Schieffelin – Clemson
Hunter Sallis – Wake Forest	Chase Hunter – Clemson
Cooper Flagg – Duke	Jamir Watkins – Florida State
Markus Burton – Notre Dame	Baye Ndongo – Georgia Tech
Nijel Pack – Miami	Ishmael Leggett – Pitt

===== ACC preseason player of the year =====
- R.J. Davis – North Carolina (40)
- Cooper Flagg – Duke (10)
- Hunter Sallis – Wake Forest (3)
- Maxime Raynaud – Stanford (1)

===== ACC preseason freshman of the year =====
- Cooper Flagg – Duke (53)
- Jeremiah Wilkinson – California (1)

=== Early season tournaments ===
Team	Tournament	Finish
Boston College	Cayman Islands Classic	Champions
California	–	–
Clemson	Sunshine Slam	Beach Bracket Champions
Duke	Vegas Showdown	2nd Place
Florida State	–	–
Georgia Tech	–	–
Louisville	Battle 4 Atlantis	2nd Place
Miami	Charleston Classic	8th Place
North Carolina	Maui Invitational	4th Place
NC State	Rady Children’s Invitational	4th Place
Notre Dame	Players Era Festival	8th Place
Pittsburgh	Greenbrier Tip-Off	Mountain Division 2nd Place
SMU	Acrisure Holiday Invitational	Champions
Stanford	–	–
Syracuse	Legends Classic	4th Place
Virginia	Bahamas Championship	4th Place
Virginia Tech	Fort Myers Tip-Off	Beach Division 4th Place
Wake Forest	ESPN Events Invitational	3rd Place

== Regular season ==
=== Rankings ===
Legend
	Increase in ranking
	Decrease in ranking
	Not ranked previous week
	First Place votes shown in ()
т	Tied

		Pre	Wk 2	Wk 3	Wk 4	Wk 5	Wk 6	Wk 7	Wk 8	Wk 9	Wk 10	Wk 11	Wk 12	Wk 13	Wk 14	Wk 15	Wk 16	Wk 17	Wk 18	Wk 19	Wk 20	Final
Boston College	AP																					
Boston College	C																					
California	AP																					
California	C																					
Clemson	AP	RV	RV	RV		RV	16	25	RV	RV	RV	RV	RV	RV	RV	23	18	13	11	10	12	22
Clemson	C	RV	RV			RV	16	RV	RV	RV	RV	RV	RV	25	21	19	17	14	11	10	13	23
Duke	AP	7	6	12	11	9	4	5	4	4	4	3 (1)	2	2	2	3т	3	2	2	1 (52)	1 (49)	3
Duke	C	5	6	10	10	9	6	5	4	4	4	3	2	2	2	5	3	2 (2)	2 (1)	1 (26)	1 (25)	3
Florida State	AP				RV	RV																
Florida State	C																					
Georgia Tech	AP																					
Georgia Tech	C																					
Louisville	AP	RV				RV						RV	25	21	RV	RV	25	19	14	13	10	21
Louisville	C											RV	RV	22	RV	RV	22	17	13	13	11	21
Miami	AP	RV	RV	RV																		
Miami	C																					
North Carolina	AP	9	10	10	12	20	RV	RV	RV	RV												
North Carolina	C	10	11	12	13	22	RV	RV	RV	RV											RV	
NC State	AP																					
NC State	C																					
Notre Dame	AP																					
Notre Dame	C																					
Pittsburgh	AP			RV	RV	18	RV	RV	RV	RV	RV											
Pittsburgh	C			RV	25	19	RV	RV	RV	RV	RV											
SMU	AP																					
SMU	C																					
Stanford	AP																					
Stanford	C																					
Syracuse	AP																					
Syracuse	C																					
Virginia	AP																					
Virginia	C	RV																				
Virginia Tech	AP																					
Virginia Tech	C																					
Wake Forest	AP	RV	RV										RV									
Wake Forest	C	RV	RV	RV																		

=== Conference matrix ===
This table summarizes the head-to-head results between teams in conference play.

	Boston College	California	Clemson	Duke	Florida State	Georgia Tech	Louisville	Miami	North Carolina	NC State	Notre Dame	Pittsburgh	SMU	Stanford	Syracuse	Virginia	Virginia Tech	Wake Forest
vs. Boston College	–	82–71	78–69	88–63	76–77	85–64; 54–69	84–58	68–78	102–96^{OT}	70–62	78–60; 97–94^{2OT}	93–67	103–77	78–60	79–71; 95–86^{3OT}	74–56	36–54	72–66
vs. California	71–82	–	80–68	78–57	68–77	90–88^{OT}	85–68	94–98^{OT}	79–53	62–65; 62–74	112–110^{4OT}	86–74	76–65; 81–77	89–81; 66–61	75–66	61–75	71–68	76–66
vs. Clemson	69–78	68–80	–	71–77	57–77; 46–72	59–70; 89–86^{3OT}	74–64	55–65	65–85	58–68	68–83	75–78^{OT}	69–79	71–85	72–86	58–71	57–72; 47–65	62–73
vs. Duke	63–88	57–78	77–71	–	65–100	56–82	65–76	54–89; 60–97	70–87; 69–82	64–74	78–86	47–76	62–89	70–106	54–83	62–80	65–88	56–63; 60–93
vs. Florida State	77–76	77–68	77–57; 72–46	100–65	–	78–91	90–76; 89–81	65–80; 66–74	96–85	84–74^{OT}	60–67	70–82	69–76	78–71	74–90	60–57	76–66	70–72
vs. Georgia Tech	64–85; 69–54	88–90^{OT}	70–59; 86–89^{3OT}	82–56	91–78	–	70–77	74–89	68–65	62–87	75–86; 71–68	67–73	93–71	52–60	62–55	75–61	64–71	69–43
vs. Louisville	58–84	68–85	64–74	76–65	76–90; 81–89	77–70	–	78–88	70–83	66–91	60–75	78–82; 68–79	73–98	48–68	61–85	50–70; 67–81	66–71	59–72
vs. Miami	78–68	98–94^{OT}	65–55	89–54; 97–60	80–65; 74–66	89–74	88–78	–	92–73	70–72	57–63	74–65	117–74	88–51	84–91	82–71	86–85; 81–68	88–78
vs. North Carolina	96–102^{OT}	53–79	85–65	87–70; 82–69	85–96	65–68	83–70	73–92	–	61–63; 73–97	73–74	73–65; 66–67	67–82	72–71	82–88	66–81	59–91	67–66
vs. NC State	62–70	65–62; 74–62	68–58	74–64	74–84^{OT}	87–62	66–91	72–70	63–61; 97–73	–	65–66	63–71	63–57	74–73	74–60	70–67	79–76	77–59; 73–85
vs. Notre Dame	60–78; 94–97^{2OT}	110–112^{4OT}	83–68	86–78	67–60	86–75; 68–71	75–60	63–57	74–73	66–65	–	72–76	97–73	54–56	64–69; 77–69	59–74	65–63	74–71
vs. Pittsburgh	67–93	74–86	78–75^{OT}	76–47	82–70	73–67	82–78; 79–68	65–74	65–73; 67–66	71–63	76–72	–	83–63	68–83	73–77; 69–80	73–57	59–64	76–74
vs. SMU	77–103	65–76; 77–81	79–69	89–62	76–69	71–93	98–73	74–117	82–57	57–63	73–97	63–83	–	61–85; 71–68	75–77	51–63; 52–54	75–81	77–66
vs. Stanford	60–78	81–89; 61–66	85–71	106–70	71–78	60–52	68–48	51–88	71–72	73–74	56–54	83–68	85–61; 68–71	–	61–70	65–88	59–70	80–67; 79–73
vs. Syracuse	71–79; 86–95^{3OT}	66–75	86–72	83–54	90–74	55–62	85–61	91–84	88–82	60–74	69–64; 69–77	77–73; 80–69	77–75	70–61	–	70–84	101–95^{OT}	81–71
vs. Virginia	56–74	75–61	71–58	80–62	57–60	61–75	70–50; 81–67	71–82	81–66	67–70	74–59	57–73	63–51; 54–52	88–65	84–70	–	75–74; 70–73	75–83
vs. Virginia Tech	54–36	68–71	72–57; 65–47	88–65	66–76	71–64	71–66	85–86; 68–81	91–59	76–79	63–65	64–59	81–75	70–59	95–101^{OT}	74–75; 73–70	–	72–63
vs. Wake Forest	66–72	66–76	73–62	63–56; 93–60	72–70	43–69	72–59	78–88	66–67	59–77; 85–73	71–74	74–76	66–77	67–80; 73–79	71–81	83–75	63–72	–
Total	4–16	6–14	18–2	19–1	8–12	10–10	18–2	3–17	13–7	5–15	8–12	8–12	13–7	11–9	7–13	8–12	8–12	13–7

=== Player of the week ===
Throughout the conference regular season, the Atlantic Coast Conference offices named Player(s) of the week and Rookie(s) of the week.
Cooper Flagg was named Rookie of the Week a total of twelve times throughout the season, which was the most ever in the ACC. The previous record of ten times was held by three players.

Week	Date Awarded	Player of the week	Rookie of the week	Reference
Week 1	November 11	Jamir Watkins – Florida State	Kon Knueppel – Duke	
Week 1	November 11	Nijel Pack – Miami (FL)	Kon Knueppel – Duke	
Week 2	November 18	Maxime Raynaud – Stanford	Cooper Flagg – Duke	
Week 3	November 25	Cooper Flagg – Duke	Cooper Flagg (2) – Duke	
Week 4	December 2	Chucky Hepburn – Louisville	Donnie Freeman – Syracuse	
Week 4	December 2	Chucky Hepburn – Louisville	Jeremiah Wilkinson – California	
Week 5	December 9	Ian Schieffelin – Clemson	Cooper Flagg (3) – Duke	
Week 6	December 16	Matt Cross – SMU	Brandin Cummings – Pittsburgh	
Week 7	December 23	Reyne Smith – Louisville	Cooper Flagg (4) – Duke	
Week 7	December 23	Maxime Raynaud (2) – Stanford	Cooper Flagg (4) – Duke	
Week 8	December 30	Donald Hand Jr. – Boston College	Ian Jackson – North Carolina	
Week 9	January 6	Cooper Flagg (2) – Duke	Cooper Flagg (5) – Duke	
Week 10	January 13	Cooper Flagg (3) – Duke	Cooper Flagg (6) – Duke	
Week 11	January 20	Hunter Sallis – Wake Forest	Cooper Flagg (7) – Duke	
Week 12	January 27	Maxime Raynaud (3) – Stanford	Cooper Flagg (8) – Duke	
Week 12	January 27	Maxime Raynaud (3) – Stanford	Jeremiah Wilkinson (2) – California	
Week 13	February 3	Donald Hand Jr. (2) – Boston College	Cooper Flagg (9) – Duke	
Week 13	February 3	Cooper Flagg (4) – Duke	Cooper Flagg (9) – Duke	
Week 14	February 10	Terrence Edwards Jr. – Louisville	Jeremiah Wilkinson (3) – California	
Week 14	February 10	Cameron Hildreth – Wake Forest	Jeremiah Wilkinson (3) – California	
Week 15	February 17	Naithan George – Georgia Tech	Cooper Flagg (10) – Duke	
Week 16	February 24	Cooper Flagg (5) – Duke	Cooper Flagg (11) – Duke	
Week 16	February 24	Donald Hand Jr. (3) – Boston College	Cooper Flagg (11) – Duke	
Week 17	March 3	Chucky Hepburn (2) – Louisville	Isaiah Evans – Duke	
Week 18	March 10	Markus Burton – Notre Dame	Cooper Flagg (12) – Duke	

=== Records against other conferences ===
2024–25 records against non-conference foes. Records shown for regular season only.
Updated through games played on February 22, 2025

Power 4 Conferences & Gonzaga	Record
Big East	2–5
Big Ten	8–8
Big 12	3–8
SEC	5–30
Gonzaga	0–0
Power 7 Total	17–51
Other NCAA Division I Conferences	Record
America East	4–0
American	4–2
A-10	4–3
ASUN	6–2
Big Sky	2–0
Big South	14–1
Big West	5–1
CAA	7–1
C-USA	2–0
Horizon League	3–0
Ivy League	2–2
MAAC	3–1
MAC	1–0
MEAC	6–0
MVC	2–1
Mountain West	2–2
NEC	8–0
OVC	1–0
Patriot League	9–0
Pacific West	0–0
SoCon	6–0
Southland	2–0
SWAC	7–0
The Summit	2–0
Sun Belt	3–0
WAC	5–1
WCC (not including Gonzaga)	3–0
Other Division I Total	113–18
NCAA Division I Total	131–67

== Postseason ==
=== ACC tournament ===
- The 2025 Atlantic Coast Conference Basketball Tournament was held at the Spectrum Center in Charlotte, North Carolina, from March 11–15, 2025.

First round Tuesday, March 11
12	Notre Dame	55
13	Pittsburgh	54
10	Virginia Tech	73
15	California	82^{2OT}
11	Florida State	62
14	Syracuse	66

Second round Wednesday, March 12
8	Georgia Tech	66
9	Virginia	60
5	North Carolina	76
12	Notre Dame	56
7	Stanford	78
15	California	73
6	SMU	73
14	Syracuse	53

Quarterfinals; Thursday, March 13
1	1 Duke	78
8	Georgia Tech	70
4	Wake Forest	59
5	North Carolina	68
2	13 Louisville	75
7	Stanford	73
3	10 Clemson	57
6	SMU	54

Semifinals; Friday, March 14
1	1 Duke	74
5	North Carolina	71
2	13 Louisville	76
3	10 Clemson	73

Championship; Saturday, March 15
1	1 Duke	73
2	13 Louisville	62

=== NCAA tournament ===
Seed	Region	School	First Four	First round	Second round	Sweet 16	Elite Eight	Final Four	Championship
1	East	Duke	Bye	W 93–49 vs. (16) Mount St. Mary's (Raleigh)	W 89–66 vs. (9) Baylor (Raleigh)	W 100–93 vs. (4) Arizona (Newark)	W 85–65 vs. (2) Alabama (Newark)	L 67–70 vs. (MW1) Houston (San Antonio)	DNP
5	Midwest	Clemson	Bye	L 67–69 vs. (12) McNeese (Providence)	DNP				
8	South	Louisville	Bye	L 75–89 vs. (9) Creighton (Lexington)	DNP				
11	South	North Carolina	W 95–68 vs. (11) San Diego State (Dayton)	L 64–71 vs. (6) Ole Miss (Milwaukee)	DNP				
		W–L (%):	1–0 (1.000)	1–3 (.250)	1–0 (1.000)	1–0 (1.000)	1–0 (1.000)	0–1 (.000)	0–0 (–)
Total: 5–4 (.556)

=== National Invitation tournament ===
Seed	Bracket	School	1st round	2nd round	Quarterfinals	Semifinals	Championship
1	Dallas	SMU	W 73–63 vs. Northern Iowa (Dallas)	L 83–85 vs. (4) Oklahoma State (Dallas)	DNP		
2	San Francisco	Stanford	W 87–70 vs. Cal State Northridge (Stanford)	L 75–77 vs. Kent State (Stanford)	DNP		
4	Irvine	Georgia Tech	L 64–81 vs. Jacksonville State (Atlanta)	DNP			
		W–L (%):	2–1 (.667)	0–2 (.000)	0–0 (–)	0–0 (–)	0–0 (–)
Total: 2–3 (.400)

== Honors and awards ==
=== All-Americans ===
Consensus All-Americans
First Team	Second Team
Cooper Flagg	None

To earn "consensus" status, a player must win honors based on a point system computed from the four different all-America teams. The point system consists of three points for first team, two points for second team and one point for third team. No honorable mention or fourth team or lower are used in the computation. The top five totals plus ties are first team and the next five plus ties are second team.

Associated Press	NABC	Sporting News	USBWA
First Team
Cooper Flagg	Cooper Flagg	Cooper Flagg	Cooper Flagg
Second Team
None	None	None	None
Third Team
None	None	None	None

=== ACC Awards ===
2024-25 ACC Men's Basketball Individual Awards
Award	Recipient(s)
Player of the Year	Cooper Flagg – Duke
Coach of the Year	Pat Kelsey – Louisville
Defensive Player of the Year	Chucky Hepburn – Louisville
Rookie of the Year	Cooper Flagg – Duke
Most Improved Player of the Year	Donald Hand Jr. – Boston College
Sixth Man Award	Jeremiah Wilkinson – California

2024-25 ACC Men's Basketball All-Conference Teams
First Team	Second Team	Third Team	Honorable Mention
Cooper Flagg – Duke; Maxime Raynaud – Stanford; Chucky Hepburn – Louisville; Chase Hunter – Clemson; Hunter Sallis – Wake Forest	R. J. Davis – North Carolina; Markus Burton – Notre Dame; Ian Schieffelin – Clemson; Kon Knueppel – Duke; Jamir Watkins – Florida State	Terrence Edwards Jr. – Louisville; Tyrese Proctor – Duke; Baye Ndongo – Georgia Tech; Boopie Miller – SMU; Jaland Lowe – Pittsburgh	Matthew Cleveland – Miami; Andrej Stojaković – California; Naithan George – Georgia Tech; Isaac McKneely – Virginia; JJ Starling – Syracuse; Donald Hand Jr. – Boston College; Cameron Hildreth – Wake Forest; Khaman Maluach – Duke; Viktor Lakhin – Clemson; Eddie Lampkin – Syracuse

2024-25 ACC Men's Basketball All-Freshman Team
Player	Team	Votes
Cooper Flagg	Duke	80
Ian Jackson	North Carolina	65
Kon Knueppel	Duke	79
Khaman Maluach	Duke	47
Jeremiah Wilkinson	California	47

2024-25 ACC Men's Basketball All-Defensive Team
Player	Team	Votes
Zack Austin	Pittsburgh	28
B. J. Edwards	SMU	34
Cooper Flagg	Duke	57
Sion James	Duke	28
Jaeden Zackery	Clemson	55

== NBA draft ==
PG	Point guard	SG	Shooting guard	SF	Small forward	PF	Power forward	C	Center

Player	Team	Round	Pick #	Position	School
(United States) Cooper Flagg	Dallas Mavericks	1	1	PF	Duke
(United States) Kon Knueppel	Charlotte Hornets	1	4	SF	Duke
(South Sudan) Khaman Maluach	Houston Rockets	1	10	C	Duke
(United States) Drake Powell	Brooklyn Nets	1	22	SG	North Carolina
(United States) Sion James	Charlotte Hornets	2	33	SG	Duke
(France) Maxime Raynaud	Sacramento Kings	2	42	C	Stanford
(United States) Jamir Watkins	Utah Jazz	2	43	SG	Florida State
(Australia) Tyrese Proctor	Cleveland Cavaliers	2	49	PG	Duke

== Attendance ==
Team	Arena	Capacity	Game 1	Game 2	Game 3	Game 4	Game 5	Game 6	Game 7	Game 8	Game 9	Game 10	Total	Average	% of Capacity
Team	Arena	Capacity	Game 11	Game 12	Game 13	Game 14	Game 15	Game 16	Game 17	Game 18	Game 19	Game 20	Total	Average	% of Capacity
Boston College	Conte Forum	8,606	4,529	4,863	3,102	2,499	4,607	3,993	4,168	4,663	5,035	6,287	78,284	4,605	53.51%
Boston College	Conte Forum	8,606	8,606	6,083	4,204	2,678	2,567	6,038	4,362				78,284	4,605	53.51%
California	Haas Pavilion	11,858	3,472	3,203	3,631	3,662	2,093	6,089	3,035	2,916	3,696	4,003	66,108	3,889	32.79%
California	Haas Pavilion	11,858	3,082	5,169	5,203	3,139	4,562	4,133	5,020				66,108	3,889	32.79%
Clemson	Littlejohn Coliseum	9,000	7,463	7,571	7,258	7,166	9,000	9,000	8,148	6,889	8,337	7,660	140,211	8,248	91.64%
Clemson	Littlejohn Coliseum	9,000	9,341	9,000	7,913	9,000	8,704	8,761	9,000				140,211	8,248	91.64%
Duke	Cameron Indoor Stadium	9,314	9,314	9,314	9,314	9,314	9,314	9,314	9,314	9,314	9,314	9,314	158,338	9,314	100%
Duke	Cameron Indoor Stadium	9,314	9,314	9,314	9,314	9,314	9,314	9,314	9,314				158,338	9,314	100%
Florida State	Donald L. Tucker Center	11,675	4,872	3,068	9,797	3,253	2,589	4,354	4,383	4,941	5,784	6,751	88,725	5,545	47.50%
Florida State	Donald L. Tucker Center	11,675	6,448	5,101	6,278	7,565	7,922	5,619					88,725	5,545	47.50%
Georgia Tech	McCamish Pavilion	8,600	3,530	3,553	3,384	6,622	4,970	3,414	3,414	3,494	8,005	4,430	85,315	4,490	52.21%
Georgia Tech	McCamish Pavilion	8,600	4,914	3,949	4,047	3,668	6,147	3,869	4,648	4,491	4,765		85,315	4,490	52.21%
Louisville	KFC Yum! Center	22,090	12,490	16,976	12,220	12,462	12,729	15,312	11,668	13,150	14,248	14,991	252,683	14,864	67.29%
Louisville	KFC Yum! Center	22,090	18,233	14,533	15,588	16,473	18,459	14,442	18,707				252,683	14,864	67.29%
Miami	Watsco Center	7,972	5,550	5,701	5,361	3,244	6,389	5,582	5,214	5,539	6,597	6,420	90,061	5,298	66.45%
Miami	Watsco Center	7,972	3,922	5,509	3,649	5,752	5,290	7,801	2,541				90,061	5,298	66.45%
North Carolina	Dean Smith Center	21,750	17,242	19,555	21,750	19,020	18,420	19,959	19,594	20,031	21,750	21,750	307,821	20,521	94.35%
North Carolina	Dean Smith Center	21,750	21,750	21,750	21,750	21,750	21,750						307,821	20,521	94.35%
NC State	Lenovo Center; Reynolds Coliseum	19,722 (Lenovo); 5,500 (Reynolds)	N/A	12,949	12,425	11,692	13,219	13,396	12,577	5,500	14,289	13,515	219,845	12,932	65.57%
NC State	Lenovo Center; Reynolds Coliseum	19,722 (Lenovo); 5,500 (Reynolds)	19,500	12,881	12,728	15,299	10,029	13,190	15,118	11,538			219,845	12,932	65.57%
Notre Dame	Edmund P. Joyce Center	9,149	5,121	4,132	3,912	4,475	6,280	3,827	5,396	9,149	4,693	4,262	84,190	5,262	57.51%
Notre Dame	Edmund P. Joyce Center	9,149	6,959	5,437	4,332	6,489	4,043	5,683					84,190	5,262	57.51%
Pittsburgh	Petersen Events Center	12,508	6,579	7,537	6,229	10,882	6,391	5,948	7,164	7,177	8,087	9,065	136,072	8,004	63.99%
Pittsburgh	Petersen Events Center	12,508	10,584	11,277	9,075	8,578	7,260	6,355	7,884				136,072	8,004	63.99%
SMU	Moody Coliseum	7,000	5,454	5,014	4,930	5,056	5,468	5,025	5,189	5,220	7,105	5,526	97,141	5,714	81.63%
SMU	Moody Coliseum	7,000	6,135	5,602	6,176	5,525	6,858	7,054	5,804				97,141	5,714	81.63%
Stanford	Maples Pavilion	7,233	2,286	1,818	2,055	2,791	1,881	2,658	2,033	2,121	3,262	4,504	56,356	3,131	43.29%
Stanford	Maples Pavilion	7,233	2,950	3,837	3,220	2,774	4,841	6,510	2,925	3,890			56,356	3,131	43.29%
Syracuse	Carrier Dome	33,000	19,619	19,267	19,610	14,318	19,354	17,187	15,987	14,437	13,935	19,750	321,103	18,888	57.24%
Syracuse	Carrier Dome	33,000	20,842	20,585	23,313	20,881	22,340	19,404	20,274				321,103	18,888	57.24%
Virginia	John Paul Jones Arena	14,623	13,414	13,294	12,347	13,488	12,021	12,108	12,384	13,875	13,316	13,554	229,133	13,478	92.17%
Virginia	John Paul Jones Arena	14,623	13,481	14,637	14,637	14,637	14,445	13,992	13,503				229,133	13,478	92.17%
Virginia Tech	Cassell Coliseum	8,925	4,453	6,327	4,157	4,441	4,973	8,925	4,856	4,385	8,925	5,634	119,551	7,032	78.79%
Virginia Tech	Cassell Coliseum	8,925	8,925	8,925	8,925	8,925	8,925	8,925	8,925				119,551	7,032	78.79%
Wake Forest	LJVM Coliseum	14,665	8,956	8,829	8,482	8,468	8,705	10,254	7,463	9,633	9,685	12,799	152,729	9,546	65.09%
Wake Forest	LJVM Coliseum	14,665	13,169	10,787	8,356	7,851	10,298	8,994					152,729	9,546	65.09%
