= 2024–25 California Golden Bears men's basketball team =

American college basketball season

2024–25 California Golden Bears men's basketball
- Conference: Atlantic Coast Conference
- Record: 14–19 (6–14 ACC)
- Head coach: Mark Madsen (2nd season)
- Associate head coach: Adam Mazarei
- Assistant coaches: Amorrow Morgan; Matt Scherbenske; Jarred Jackson; Ken Moses
- Home arena: Haas Pavilion (capacity: 11,858)

2024–25 ACC men's basketball standings
| | Conf. | | | | Overall |
| Team | W | | L | PCT | W | | L | PCT |
|---|---|---|---|---|---|---|---|---|
| No. 3 Duke † | 19 | – | 1 | .950 | 35 | – | 4 | .897 |
| No. 21 Louisville | 18 | – | 2 | .900 | 27 | – | 8 | .771 |
| No. 22 Clemson | 18 | – | 2 | .900 | 27 | – | 7 | .794 |
| Wake Forest | 13 | – | 7 | .650 | 21 | – | 11 | .656 |
| North Carolina | 13 | – | 7 | .650 | 23 | – | 14 | .622 |
| SMU | 13 | – | 7 | .650 | 24 | – | 11 | .686 |
| Stanford | 11 | – | 9 | .550 | 21 | – | 14 | .600 |
| Georgia Tech | 10 | – | 10 | .500 | 17 | – | 17 | .500 |
| Virginia | 8 | – | 12 | .400 | 15 | – | 17 | .469 |
| Virginia Tech | 8 | – | 12 | .400 | 13 | – | 19 | .406 |
| Florida State | 8 | – | 12 | .400 | 17 | – | 15 | .531 |
| Notre Dame | 8 | – | 12 | .400 | 15 | – | 18 | .455 |
| Pittsburgh | 8 | – | 12 | .400 | 17 | – | 15 | .531 |
| Syracuse | 7 | – | 13 | .350 | 14 | – | 19 | .424 |
| California | 6 | – | 14 | .300 | 14 | – | 19 | .424 |
| NC State | 5 | – | 15 | .250 | 12 | – | 19 | .387 |
| Boston College | 4 | – | 16 | .200 | 12 | – | 19 | .387 |
| Miami (FL) | 3 | – | 17 | .150 | 7 | – | 24 | .226 |
† 2025 ACC tournament winner Rankings from AP poll

The 2024–25 California Golden Bears men's basketball team represented the University of California, Berkeley, in the 2024–25 NCAA Division I men's basketball season. They were led by Mark Madsen in his second season as head coach. The Golden Bears played their home games at Haas Pavilion as first-year members of the Atlantic Coast Conference.

The Golden Bears started the season with victories over in-state foes Cal State Bakersfield and Cal Poly before traveling to Nashville, Tennessee to face Vanderbilt; the Golden Bears lost 85–69. They returned to California to defeat rival USC 71–66. They hosted the Cal Classic, where they won all three games. They then made another trip to the eastern US, where they lost 98–93 to Missouri as part of the ACC–SEC Challenge. They lost their ACC opener 89–81 against rivals Stanford. These two losses were part of a stretch where the team went 1–6; their only victory was over Northwestern State. Other losses in the stretch included at twenty-third ranked San Diego State, and ACC losses against Pittsburgh and Clemson. The Golden Bears went 4–2 over their next six games, with losses to Virginia Tech and North Carolina. They defeated Miami in overtime, Virginia, NC State, and Florida State. The Golden Bears finished the season with a stretch of games where they went 2–9. Their only two wins were against NC State and Boston College. They lost to just two ranked teams over the stretch, third-ranked Duke and fourteenth-ranked Louisville. They also dropped games to rival Stanford, to Georgia Tech in overtime, and suffered a four-overtime loss to Notre Dame on the final day of the regular season.

The Golden Bears finished the season 14–19 and 6–14 in ACC play to finish in fifteenth place. As the fifteenth seed in the 2025 ACC tournament they defeated Virginia Tech in double-overtime in the first round. In the second round, they faced rival Stanford for a third time during the season. They lost 78–73 to lose to their rivals three total times during the season. They were not invited to the NCAA tournament or the NIT.

== Previous season ==
The Golden Bears finished 13–19 overall and 9–11 in conference play to finish in a three-way tie for sixth place. As the seventh seed in the Pac-12 tournament, they lost in the first round to tenth-seed Stanford. They were not invited to a post-season tournament.

== Off-season ==
=== Departures ===
Departures
| Name | Number | Pos. | Height | Weight | Year | Hometown | Reason for departure |
|---|---|---|---|---|---|---|---|
| Fardaws Aimaq | 0 | F | 6'11" | 245 | Graduate student | Vancouver, Canada | Graduated |
| Rodney Brown Jr. | 1 | G | 6'6" | 180 | Freshman | Perris, California | Transferred to Virginia Tech |
| Monty Bowser | 2 | F | 6'7" | 195 | (redshirt) Junior | Oakland, California | Transferred to Northern Arizona |
| Keonte Kennedy | 3 | G | 6'5" | 190 | Graduate student | Austin, Texas | Graduated |
| Grant Newell | 14 | F | 6'9" | 220 | Sophomore | Chicago, Illinois | Transferred to North Texas |
| Jalen Cone | 15 | G | 5'11" | 175 | Graduate student | Walkertown, North Carolina | Graduated |
| Jaylon Tyson | 20 | G | 6'7" | 215 | Junior | Allen, Texas | Drafted 20th overall in the 2024 NBA draft |
| ND Okafor | 22 | F | 6'9" | 235 | Sophomore | Dundalk, Ireland | Transferred to Washington State |
| Wrenn Robinson | 30 | G | 6'2" | 185 | (redshirt) Junior | Oakland, California | Entered transfer portal |
| Jalen Celestine | 32 | G | 6'7" | 215 | (redshirt) Junior | Ajax, Ontario | Transferred to Baylor |
| Devin Askew | 55 | G | 6'3" | 198 | Senior | Sacramento, California | Transferred to Long Beach State |

=== Incoming transfers ===
Incoming transfers
| Name | Number | Pos. | Height | Weight | Year | Hometown | Previous school |
|---|---|---|---|---|---|---|---|
| Joshua Ola-Joseph | 1 | F | 6'7" | 215 | Junior | Brooklyn Park, Minnesota | Minnesota |
| Andrej Stojaković | 2 | G | 6'7" | 205 | Sophomore | Carmichael, California | Stanford |
| DeJuan Campbell | 3 | G | 6'2" | 205 | Junior | Hampton, Virginia | Western Carolina |
| Spencer Mahoney | 7 | F | 6'9" | 230 | Freshman | New York, New York | Washington State |
| Jovan Blacksher Jr. | 10 | G | 5'11" | 165 | Graduate student | Oakland, California | Grand Canyon |
| Mady Sissoko | 12 | C | 6'9" | 250 | Graduate student | Bafoulabé, Mali | Michigan State |
| BJ Omot | 20 | F | 6'8" | 185 | Junior | Mankato, Minnesota | North Dakota |
| Christian Tucker | 22 | G | 6'3" | 178 | Senior | Chandler, Arizona | UTSA |
| Rytis Petraitis | 31 | F | 6'7" | 210 | Junior | Arlington, Texas | Air Force |
| Lee Dort | 34 | F | 6'10" | 245 | Junior | McKinney, Texas | Vanderbilt |

=== 2024 recruiting class ===
College recruiting
| Name | Hometown | School | Height | Weight | Commit date |
|---|---|---|---|---|---|
| Kevin Armstrong II; F | Minneapolis, Minnesota | Breck School | 6 ft 6 in (1.98 m) | 210 lb (95 kg) | |
| Kevin Armstrong II; F | Recruit ratings: No ratings found | | | | |
| Jaden Goodall; F | Anaheim, California | Canyon | 6 ft 6 in (1.98 m) | 175 lb (79 kg) | |
| Jaden Goodall; F | Recruit ratings: ESPN: (79) | | | | |
| Stephon Marbury II; G | Purchase, New York | DME Academy | 6 ft 1 in (1.85 m) | 170 lb (77 kg) | |
| Stephon Marbury II; G | Recruit ratings: No ratings found | | | | |
| Hugh Vandeweghe; F | Los Angeles, California | Loyola | 6 ft 7 in (2.01 m) | 215 lb (98 kg) | |
| Hugh Vandeweghe; F | Recruit ratings: No ratings found | | | | |
| Jeremiah Wilkinson; G | Powder Springs, Georgia | McEchern | 6 ft 1 in (1.85 m) | 175 lb (79 kg) | Aug 30, 2023 |
| Jeremiah Wilkinson; G | Recruit ratings: Rivals: 247Sports: | | | | |
Overall recruit ranking:
Note: In many cases, Scout, Rivals, 247Sports, On3, and ESPN may conflict in their listings of height and weight.; In these cases, the average was taken. ESPN grades are on a 100-point scale.; Sources: "2024 California Commits". Rivals.; "2024 Team Ranking". Rivals.

== Roster ==
2024–25 California Golden Bears men's basketball team
Players
Coaches

| Pos. | # | Name | Height | Weight | Year | Previous school | Hometown |
|---|---|---|---|---|---|---|---|
| G | 0 | Jeremiah Wilkinson | 6 ft 1 in (1.85 m) | 175 lb (79 kg) | Fr | McEachern High School | Powder Springs, GA |
| F | 1 | Joshua Ola-Joseph | 6 ft 7 in (2.01 m) | 215 lb (98 kg) | Jr | Compass Prep (AZ); Minnesota | Brooklyn Park, MN |
| G | 2 | Andrej Stojaković | 6 ft 7 in (2.01 m) | 205 lb (93 kg) | So | Jesuit; Stanford | Carmichael, CA |
| G | 3 | DeJuan Campbell | 6 ft 2 in (1.88 m) | 205 lb (93 kg) | Jr | Kecoughtan; Western Carolina | Hampton, VA |
| F | 7 | Spencer Mahoney | 6 ft 9 in (2.06 m) | 230 lb (104 kg) | RS Fr | Red Rock Academy; Washington State | New York, NY |
| F | 9 | Hugh Vandeweghe (W) | 6 ft 7 in (2.01 m) | 215 lb (98 kg) | Fr | Loyola | Los Angeles, CA |
| G | 10 | Jovan Blacksher Jr. | 5 ft 11 in (1.8 m) | 165 lb (75 kg) | GS | Shadow Mountain; Grand Canyon | Oakland, CA |
| C | 12 | Mady Sissoko | 6 ft 9 in (2.06 m) | 250 lb (113 kg) | GS | Wasatch Academy; Michigan State | Bafoulabé, Mali |
| F | 13 | Devin Curtis | 6 ft 11 in (2.11 m) | 210 lb (95 kg) | So | Heritage Christian School | Northridge, CA |
| G | 14 | Jack McCloskey | 6 ft 4 in (1.93 m) | 180 lb (82 kg) | So | Mater Dei High School | Santa Ana, CA |
| G | 15 | Kevin Armstrong II | 6 ft 6 in (1.98 m) | 210 lb (95 kg) | Fr | Breck School | Minneapolis, MN |
| F | 17 | Jaden Goodall | 6 ft 6 in (1.98 m) | 175 lb (79 kg) | Fr | Canyon | Anaheim, CA |
| F | 20 | BJ Omot | 6 ft 8 in (2.03 m) | 185 lb (84 kg) | Jr | Mankato East; North Dakota | Mankato, MN |
| G | 22 | Christian Tucker | 6 ft 3 in (1.91 m) | 178 lb (81 kg) | Sr | Gilbert Perry; UTSA | Chandler, AZ |
| G | 23 | Matt Desler (W) | 6 ft 1 in (1.85 m) | 180 lb (82 kg) | Sr | Bishop O'Dowd | Oakland, CA |
| F | 25 | Gus Larson | 6 ft 10 in (2.08 m) | 215 lb (98 kg) | RS Jr | Northfield Mount Hermon; Penn | New Canaan, CT |
| G | 30 | Stephon Marbury II | 6 ft 1 in (1.85 m) | 170 lb (77 kg) | Fr | DME Academy | Purchase, NY |
| F | 31 | Rytis Petraitis | 6 ft 7 in (2.01 m) | 210 lb (95 kg) | Jr | USAFA Prep School; Air Force | Arlington, TX |
| G | 32 | Jayden Karapetian (W) | 6 ft 2 in (1.88 m) | 170 lb (77 kg) | So | Viewpoint School | Woodland Hills, CA |
| G | 33 | Vladimir Pavlovic | 6 ft 3 in (1.91 m) | 190 lb (86 kg) | So | Hoosac School | Herceg Novi, Montenegro |
| F | 34 | Lee Dort | 6 ft 10 in (2.08 m) | 245 lb (111 kg) | Jr | Greenhill School; Vanderbilt | McKinney, TX |
| G | 55 | BJ Fisher | 6 ft 1 in (1.85 m) | 180 lb (82 kg) | So | Redwood High School | Ross, CA |

Head coach

- Mark Madsen (Stanford)

Assistant coach(es)

- Adam Mazarei (Redlands)
- Amorrow Morgan (Idaho State)
- Matt Scherbenske (Kentucky)
- Jarred Jackson (Lander)
- Ken Moses (CSU Pueblo)

Legend

- (C) Team captain
- (S) Suspended
- (I) Ineligible
- (W) Walk-on
- Injured
- Current redshirt

Roster
Last update: August 3, 2024

== Schedule and results ==
| Date time, TV | Rank^{#} | Opponent^{#} | Result | Record | High points | High rebounds | High assists | Site (attendance) city, state |
Regular season
| November 4, 2024*; 8:30 p.m., ACCNX/ESPN+ | | Cal State Bakersfield | W 86–73 | 1–0 | 17 – Blacksher Jr. | 6 – Tied | 4 – Blacksher Jr. | Haas Pavilion (3,472); Berkeley, CA |
| November 7, 2024*; 7:00 p.m., ACCNX/ESPN+ | | Cal Poly | W 91–73 | 2–0 | 18 – Blacksher Jr. | 11 – Dort | 3 – Campbell | Haas Pavilion (3,203); Berkeley, CA |
| November 13, 2024*; 5:00 p.m., SECN+/ESPN+ | | at Vanderbilt | L 69–85 | 2–1 | 17 – Stojaković | 10 – Dort | 4 – Blacksher Jr. | Memorial Gymnasium (5,945); Nashville, TN |
| November 17, 2024*; 6:30 p.m., BTN | | at USC | W 71–66 | 3–1 | 20 – Stojaković | 7 – Tied | 2 – Tied | Galen Center (5,466); Los Angeles, CA |
| November 21, 2024*; 7:00 p.m., ACCNX/ESPN+ | | Air Force; Cal Classic | W 78–69 | 4–1 | 23 – Wilkinson | 6 – Tied | 2 – Tied | Haas Pavilion (3,631); Berkeley, CA |
| November 24, 2024*; 1:00 p.m., ACCNX/ESPN+ | | Sacramento State; Cal Classic | W 83–77 | 5–1 | 20 – Stojaković | 6 – Tied | 5 – Petraitis | Haas Pavilion (3,662); Berkeley, CA |
| November 27, 2024*; 7:00 p.m., ACCNX/ESPN+ | | Mercyhurst; Cal Classic | W 81–55 | 6–1 | 15 – Stojaković | 9 – Sissoko | 3 – Tucker | Haas Pavilion (2,093); Berkeley, CA |
| December 3, 2024*; 4:00 p.m., SECN | | at Missouri; ACC–SEC Challenge | L 93–98 | 6–2 | 26 – Stojaković | 9 – Sissoko | 8 – Blacksher Jr. | Mizzou Arena (9,791); Columbia, MO |
| December 7, 2024; 1:00 p.m., ACCN | | Stanford; Rivalry | L 81–89 | 6–3 (0–1) | 25 – Stojaković | 8 – Tied | 2 – Blacksher, Jr. | Haas Pavilion (6,089); Berkeley, CA |
| December 10, 2024*; 7:00 p.m., ACCNX/ESPN+ | | Cornell | L 80–88 | 6–4 | 21 – Ola-Joseph | 8 – Tied | 7 – Blacksher Jr. | Haas Pavilion (3,035); Berkeley, CA |
| December 14, 2024*; 12:00 p.m., ACCNX/ESPN+ | | Northwestern State | W 84–66 | 7–4 | 31 – Stojaković | 8 – Petraitis | 4 – Stojaković | Haas Pavilion (2,916); Berkeley, CA |
| December 21, 2024*; 7:30 p.m., ACCN | | vs. No. 23 San Diego State; San Jose Tip-Off | L 50–71 | 7–5 | 13 – Wilkinson | 11 – Sissoko | 2 – Wilkinson | SAP Center; San Jose, CA |
| January 1, 2025; 11:00 a.m., ACCN | | at Pittsburgh | L 74–86 | 7–6 (0–2) | 24 – Wilkinson | 6 – Wilkinson | 4 – Blacksher Jr. | Petersen Events Center (7,177); Pittsburgh, PA |
| January 4, 2025; 5:30 p.m., ESPN2 | | at Clemson | L 68–80 | 7–7 (0–3) | 30 – Stojaković | 5 – Tied | 2 – Petraitis | Littlejohn Coliseum (7,660); Clemson, SC |
| January 8, 2025; 8:00 p.m., ESPN2 | | Virginia | W 75–61 | 8–7 (1–3) | 23 – Stojaković | 11 – Sissoko | 3 – Tied | Haas Pavilion (3,696); Berkeley, CA |
| January 11, 2025; 3:00 p.m., ACCN | | Virginia Tech | L 68–71 | 8–8 (1–4) | 24 – Stojaković | 10 – Petraitis | 5 – Campbell | Haas Pavilion (4,003); Berkeley, CA |
| January 15, 2025; 4:00 p.m., ACCN | | at North Carolina | L 53–79 | 8–9 (1–5) | 16 – Sissoko | 8 – Sissoko | 4 – Stojaković | Dean Smith Center (20,031); Chapel Hill, NC |
| January 18, 2025; 3:00 p.m., ACCN | | at NC State | W 65–62 | 9–9 (2–5) | 14 – Blacksher Jr. | 9 – Petraitis | 3 – Petraitis | Lenovo Center (12,881); Raleigh |
| January 22, 2025; 6:00 p.m., ACCN | | Florida State | W 77–68 | 10–9 (3–5) | 18 – Wilkinson | 13 – Tied | 4 – Petraitis | Haas Pavilion (3,082); Berkeley, CA |
| January 25, 2025; 5:30 p.m., ESPNU | | Miami | W 98–94 ^{OT} | 11–9 (4–5) | 30 – Wilkinson | 10 – Sissoko | 4 – Campbell | Haas Pavilion (5,169); Berkeley, CA |
| January 29, 2025; 6:00 p.m., ACCN | | at SMU | L 65–76 | 11–10 (4–6) | 18 – Petraitis | 10 – Petraitis | 4 – Wilkinson | Moody Coliseum (5,602); Dallas, TX |
| February 1, 2025; 7:00 p.m., ESPN2 | | Syracuse | L 66–75 | 11–11 (4–7) | 20 – Tied | 8 – Petraitis | 2 – Petraitis | Haas Pavilion (5,203); Berkeley, CA |
| February 5, 2025; 8:00 p.m., ACCN | | NC State | W 74–62 | 12–11 (5–7) | 18 – Blackshear Jr. | 13 – Sissoko | 4 – Wilkinson | Haas Pavilion (3,139); Berkeley, CA |
| February 8, 2025; 2:00 p.m., ACCN | | Wake Forest | L 66–76 | 12–12 (5–8) | 21 – Wilkinson | 10 – Sissoko | 3 – Tied | Haas Pavilion (4,562); Berkeley, CA |
| February 12, 2025; 6:00 p.m., ACCN | | at No. 3 Duke | L 57–78 | 12–13 (5–9) | 21 – Wilkinson | 7 – Ola-Joseph | 3 – Tied | Cameron Indoor Stadium (9,314); Durham, NC |
| February 15, 2025; 1:00 p.m., ACCN | | at Georgia Tech | L 88–90 ^{OT} | 12–14 (5–10) | 25 – Wilkinson | 11 – Sissoko | 4 – Tied | McCamish Pavilion (4,648); Atlanta, GA |
| February 22, 2025; 7:00 p.m., ESPN2 | | at Stanford; Rivalry | L 61–66 | 12–15 (5–11) | 19 – Wilkinson | 10 – Tied | 1 – Tied | Maples Pavilion (6,510); Stanford, CA |
| February 26, 2025; 8:00 p.m., ESPNU | | SMU | L 77–81 | 12–16 (5–12) | 20 – Wilkinson | 8 – Sissoko | 3 – Campbell | Haas Pavilion (4,133); Berkeley, CA |
| March 1, 2025; 7:00 p.m., ESPNU | | Boston College | W 82–71 | 13–16 (6–12) | 21 – Sissoko | 15 – Sissoko | 4 – Tied | Haas Pavilion (5,020); Berkeley, CA |
| March 5, 2025; 6:00 p.m., ACCN | | at No. 14 Louisville | L 68–85 | 13–17 (6–13) | 22 – Blacksher Jr. | 13 – Sissoko | 3 – Blacksher Jr. | KFC Yum! Center (14,442); Louisville, KY |
| March 8, 2025; 1:00 p.m., ACCN | | at Notre Dame | L 110–112 ^{4OT} | 13–18 (6–14) | 36 – Wilkinson | 13 – Sissoko | 5 – Blacksher Jr. | Joyce Center (5,683); South Bend, IN |
ACC tournament
| March 11, 2025; 1:30 p.m., ACCN | (15) | vs. (10) Virginia Tech; First round | W 82–73 ^{2OT} | 14–18 | 29 – Stojaković | 10 – Tied | 2 – Tied | Spectrum Center (5,136); Charlotte, NC |
| March 12, 2025; 4:00 p.m., ESPN2 | (15) | vs. (7) Stanford; Second round, rivalry | L 73–78 | 14–19 | 37 – Stojaković | 10 – Campbell | 4 – Tucker | Spectrum Center (6,620); Charlotte, NC |
*Non-conference game. ^{#}Rankings from AP Poll. (#) Tournament seedings in parentheses. All times are in Pacific Time.
