= Reuben Lowery =

American football player (born 2002)

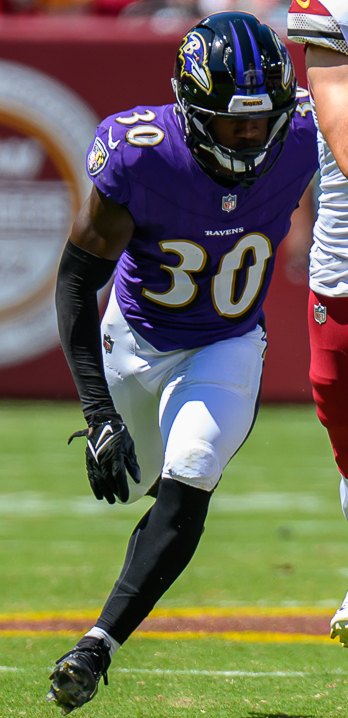
- Lowery with the Baltimore Ravens in 2025

No. 30, 36
- Position: Safety

Personal information
- Born: July 30, 2002 (age 24); Powder Springs, Georgia, U.S.
- Listed height: 5 ft 9 in (1.75 m)
- Listed weight: 204 lb (93 kg)

Career information
- High school: Hillgrove (Powder Springs)
- College: Chattanooga (2020–2024)
- NFL draft: 2025: undrafted

Career history
- Baltimore Ravens (2025); Indianapolis Colts (2025)

Awards and highlights
- First-team All-SoCon (2024); Second-team All-SoCon (2022)

Career NFL statistics
- Tackles: 5
- Stats at Pro Football Reference

Reuben Lowery III (born July 30, 2002) is an American former professional football player who was a safety in the National Football League (NFL). He played college football for the Chattanooga Mocs and was signed by the Baltimore Ravens as an undrafted free agent in 2025.

== Early life ==
Lowery wasn't a heavily recruited player coming out of high school because of his height and size. However, after attending a summer football camp at Chattanooga, the coaching staff was sold immediately.

== College career ==
Lowrey appeared in 46 games with 29 starts and totaling 166 tackles, 19.0 for loss, 15 pass breakups, and three interceptions with two pick-sixes. He earned All-SoCon honors two times, including First Team in 2024, and was twice named SoCon Defensive Player of the Week. His senior season saw him start all 11 games, finish second on the team with 62 tackles, and return another interception for a touchdown.

Off the field, Lowrey excelled academically, graduating in May 2023 with Latin Honors in Mechanical engineering. He also contributed to the nationally recognized UTC Rocket Mocs rocketry team.

== Professional career ==
Pre-draft measurables
Height	Weight	Arm length	Hand span	40-yard dash	10-yard split	20-yard split	20-yard shuttle	Three-cone drill	Vertical jump	Broad jump	Bench press
5 ft 9 1/4 in (1.76 m)	204 lb (93 kg)	31 3/4 in (0.81 m)	9 1/4 in (0.23 m)	4.45 s	1.57 s	2.61 s	4.16 s	7.03 s	37.0 in (0.94 m)	10 ft 3 in (3.12 m)	17 reps
All values from Pro Day

=== Baltimore Ravens ===
Lowery was not selected in the 2025 NFL Draft. He signed as an undrafted free agent with the Baltimore Ravens. He made the Ravens' initial 53-man roster, playing in three games, including a start in Week 5 against the Houston Texans, but was waived on October 11, 2025.

=== Indianapolis Colts ===
On October 13, 2025, Lowery was claimed off waivers by the Indianapolis Colts.

On June 9, 2026, Lowery retired from professional football.
