= Hillgrove High School =

Public high school in Powder Springs, Georgia, United States

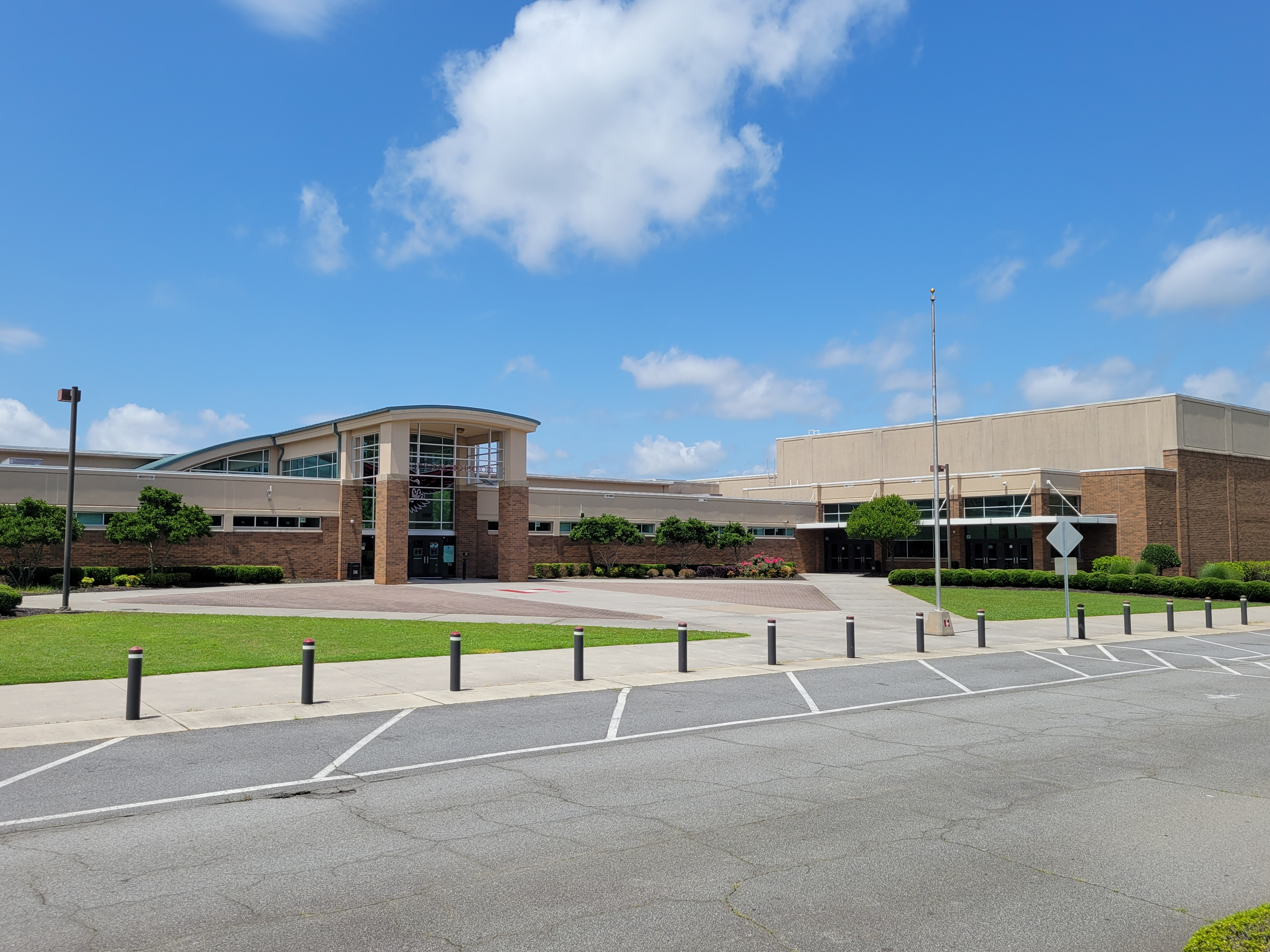
- Hillgrove High School

Location
- 4165 Luther Ward Road; Powder Springs, Georgia 30127; United States; 33°55′34″N 84°40′01″W

Information
- School type: Public high school
- Motto: "Soaring toward deliberate success in academics, the arts, and athletic achievement."
- Established: 2006; 20 years ago
- School district: Cobb County School District
- Principal: Angela Stewart
- Teaching staff: 125.10 (FTE)
- Grades: 9–12
- Enrollment: 2,282 (2024-2025)
- Student to teacher ratio: 18.24
- Campus: Suburban
- Colors: Crimson and silver
- Athletics conference: Georgia High School Association
- Nickname: Hawks
- Rival: McEachern High School
- Website: www.cobbk12.org/hillgrove/

Hillgrove High School is a public high school in unincorporated Cobb County, Georgia, United States, with a Powder Springs address, and is the fifteenth high school of the Cobb County School District. The school's mascot is the Hawk.

== History ==
Established in 2006, Hillgrove High School was built on 98 acres (400,000 m^{2}). The land was donated by Harry Hill and Harriet Hargrove Hill to Young Harris College and then sold to the Cobb County Board of Education by the university. The Hills purchased the land in 1952 to raise cattle and Tennessee Walking Horses. The Hills give college scholarships to Hillgrove students who excel at their studies.

== Academics ==
Hillgrove High is ranked #42 among public high schools in the state of Georgia and #32 in the Atlanta metropolitan area, with a graduation rate of approximately 94%. The school offers over twenty Advanced Placement courses, with a 38% student participation rate. Approximately 60% of students are from minority backgrounds, and 34% are economically disadvantaged. Hillgrove High is one of 18 high schools in the Cobb County School District.

The school also offers "Career Tech" pathways, CTAE courses including:

- Programming
- Engineering Graphics & Design
- Audio/Video Technology & Film
- Business Management/Career Technology
- Culinary Arts
- Sports & Entertainment
- Marketing

=== NJROTC ===
The Hillgrove High School Naval Junior Reserve Officers' Training Corps has won numerous accolades and awards since its establishment in 2009 and commission in 2010. The Orienteering Team has also won three state championships and was the national champion team in 2019, 2022, and 2023.

== Athletics ==
A small council of students from neighboring Cobb County schools met to choose Hillgrove's mascot, the hawk. This was chosen due to the many indigenous hawks living around the property upon which Hillgrove was built. The school is home to various athletic teams.

- Baseball
- Basketball
- Cheerleading
- Chess
- Cross Country
- Dance
- Football
- Girls Flag Football
- Golf
- Lacrosse
- Riflery
- Soccer
- Softball
- Swim & Dive
- Tennis
- Track & Field
- Volleyball
- Wrestling

- Marching band - winter guard

== Performing Arts ==
Hillgrove High School in Powder Springs, Georgia, maintains a Performing Arts program that includes concert band, jazz band, marching band, orchestra, and drama.

=== Concert Band ===
The Hillgrove Wind Symphony has received national recognition. In 2025, the ensemble performed at the University of Georgia’s JanFest, and was invited to the 2025 Music for All National Concert Band Festival. The band is currently under the direction of Jeremy Lumpkin and assistant director Stephen Mattson.

=== Jazz Band ===
Hillgrove's Jazz Orchestra has performed at the GMEA In-Service Conference and the Essentially Ellington Festival in Nashville in 2023. It earned international recognition with an invitation to the 2023 Midwest Clinic.

=== Marching Band ===
The Hillgrove Marching Band has been active since the school opened in 2006. In 2019, it performed at the 75th Anniversary D-Day Parade in France. The band partnered with Kell High School to create "Kellgrove," achieving second place in the Fayette County Marching Band Finals with their show Ohana.

In 2023, the band won Grand Champions at the Western Carolina University Tournament of Champions with their show Forew4rned. Their 2024 show, As the World Runs Dry, inspired by *Mad Max* and *Dune*, premiered at BOA UAB. Their 2025 show The Shape of Infinity made finals at 3 competitions.

=== Orchestra ===
Since 2006, Hillgrove's orchestra program has grown to more than 150 students across three ensembles. These ensembles have performed at notable venues such as Orchestra Hall in Chicago, Carnegie Hall in New York, and internationally in China, France, and Iceland.

=== Drama ===
Hillgrove's drama program, led by Thespian Troupe #7190, has presented multiple productions:

- 2024 Spring Musical: *Mean Girls*
- 2023 Fall Musical: *The Wiz*
- 2022 One-Act Play: *Our Place*

== Notable alumni ==
- Bradley Chubb (2014), NFL outside linebacker
- Kenyan Drake (2012), NFL running back
- Evan Engram (2013), NFL tight end
- Reuben Lowery (2020), NFL free safety
- Jaylen McCollough (2019), NFL safety
- Myles Murphy (2020), NFL defensive end
- Chig Okonkwo (2018), NFL tight end
- Jalen Royals (2021), NFL wide receiver
- Collin Sexton (transferred), NBA point guard
- Jeremiah Wilkinson (2024), NCAA Basketball point guard
- Bktherula (2020), musical artist
