= 2024–25 Florida State Seminoles men's basketball team =

American college basketball season

2024–25 Florida State Seminoles men's basketball
- Conference: Atlantic Coast Conference
- Record: 17–15 (8–12 ACC)
- Head coach: Leonard Hamilton (23rd season)
- Associate head coach: Stan Jones (23rd season)
- Assistant coaches: Kevin Nickelberry (2nd season); Jake Morton (1st season)
- Home arena: Donald L. Tucker Center

2024–25 ACC men's basketball standings
	Conf.				Overall
Team	W		L	PCT	W		L	PCT
No. 3 Duke †	19	–	1	.950	35	–	4	.897
No. 21 Louisville	18	–	2	.900	27	–	8	.771
No. 22 Clemson	18	–	2	.900	27	–	7	.794
Wake Forest	13	–	7	.650	21	–	11	.656
North Carolina	13	–	7	.650	23	–	14	.622
SMU	13	–	7	.650	24	–	11	.686
Stanford	11	–	9	.550	21	–	14	.600
Georgia Tech	10	–	10	.500	17	–	17	.500
Virginia	8	–	12	.400	15	–	17	.469
Virginia Tech	8	–	12	.400	13	–	19	.406
Florida State	8	–	12	.400	17	–	15	.531
Notre Dame	8	–	12	.400	15	–	18	.455
Pittsburgh	8	–	12	.400	17	–	15	.531
Syracuse	7	–	13	.350	14	–	19	.424
California	6	–	14	.300	14	–	19	.424
NC State	5	–	15	.250	12	–	19	.387
Boston College	4	–	16	.200	12	–	19	.387
Miami (FL)	3	–	17	.150	7	–	24	.226
† 2025 ACC tournament winner Rankings from AP poll

The 2024–25 Florida State Seminoles men's basketball team represented Florida State University during the 2024–25 NCAA Division I men's basketball season. The Seminoles were led by head coach Leonard Hamilton, in his twenty-third, and final, year, and played their home games at the Donald L. Tucker Center on the university's Tallahassee, Florida campus as members of the Atlantic Coast Conference.

The season started well for the Seminoles as they won three straight games. Their first loss came in the fourth game of the season, when they lost to rivals Florida, 87–74. The team rebounded by defeating Hofstra before traveling to Connecticut to compete in the Hall of Fame Tip-Off. They won both games they played in the showcase tournament defeating Temple, 78–69, and UMass, 92–59. The teams' four game winning streak ended in the ACC–SEC Challenge when they lost to LSU. They followed that with a loss in their ACC opener at NC State in overtime. They defeated Tulane in the Orange Bowl Classic to end the two-game skid. They ended their non-conference schedule with a defeat of Winthrop. The Seminoles went 2–2 in their next four ACC games, defeating Syracuse and rivals Miami but losing to Louisville and Clemson. They followed that with an eight game stretch where they went 4–4. The stretch contained a four game losing streak, book-ended by two game winning streaks. They finished the season 2–4, where they defeated Miami and SMU. They lost to three ranked teams over the stretch, number twenty-three Clemson, number twenty-five Louisville and number two Duke.

The Seminoles finished the season 17–14 and 8–12 in ACC play to finish in a five-way tie for ninth place. As the eleventh seed in the 2025 ACC tournament, they faced fourteenth seed Syracuse in the First Round. Florida State couldn't repeat their regular season win and were defeated 66–62. They were not invited to the NCAA tournament or the NIT.

== Previous season ==
The Seminoles finished the 2023–24 season 17–16 and 10–10 in ACC play to finish in a tie for eighth place. As the ninth seed in the ACC tournament, they defeated eighth seed Virginia Tech in the Second Round before losing to first seed North Carolina in the Quarterfinals. They were not invited to the NCAA tournament or the NIT. This marked the third straight season the Seminoles did not participate in post-season play.

== Offseason ==
=== Departures ===
Florida State Departures
Name	Number	Pos.	Height	Weight	Year	Hometown	Reason for Departure
Jalen Warley	1	G	6'7"	205	Junior	Philadelphia, Pennsylvania	Transferred to Virginia
Cam Corhen	3	F	6'10"	225	Sophomore	Allen, Texas	Transferred to Pittsburgh
De'Ante Green	5	F	6'9"	210	Sophomore	Asheville, North Carolina	Transferred to South Florida
Baba Miller	11	F	6'11"	204	Sophomore	Mallorca, Spain	Transferred to Florida Atlantic
Tom House	12	G	6'7"	200	Sophomore	Dayton, Ohio	Transferred to Furman
Josh Nickelberry	20	G	6'5"	200	Graduate Student	Fayetteville, North Carolina	Graduated
Cam'Ron Fletcher	21	G	6'7"	220	Senior	St. Louis, Missouri	Transferred to Xavier
Darin Green Jr.	22	G	6'5"	195	Senior	Charlotte, North Carolina	Graduated
Primo Spears	23	G	6'3"	185	Junior	Hartford, Connecticut	Transferred to UTSA
Jaylan Gainey	33	F	6'10"	230	Graduate Student	Greensboro, North Carolina	Graduated
Isaac Spainhour	40	G	6'3"	180	(redshirt) Junior	King, North Carolina	Graduated
Max Thorpe	44	G	6'2"	175	(redshirt) Junior	Clearwater, Florida	Graduated
Michael Brown	45	F	6'7"	225	Junior	Fort Washington, Maryland	Walk-on, left team
Sola Adebisi	51	F	6'6"	190	Sophomore	Milton, Georgia	Transferred to The Citadel

=== Incoming transfers ===
Florida State Incoming Transfers
Name	Number	Pos.	Height	Weight	Year	Hometown	Previous School
Bosytn Holt	3	G	6'7"	200	Senior	Portland, Oregon	South Dakota
Jerry Deng	7	F	6'9"	220	Sophomore	Rochester, New York	Hampton
Malique Ewin	12	F	6'11"	230	Junior	Lawrenceville, Georgia	Ole Miss

=== 2024 Recruiting class ===
College recruiting information
Name	Hometown	School	Height	Weight	Commit date
Jalen Crawford; G	Tallahassee, Florida	Maclay School	6 ft 0 in (1.83 m)	145 lb (66 kg)	
Jalen Crawford; G	Recruit ratings: Rivals: 247Sports: (NR)				
Daquan Davis; G	Baltimore, Maryland	Overtime Elite	6 ft 1 in (1.85 m)	176 lb (80 kg)	Mar 24, 2024
Daquan Davis; G	Recruit ratings: Rivals: 247Sports: ESPN: (82)				
Alier Maluk; F	Baldwin, Pennsylvania	Long Island Lutheran	7 ft 0 in (2.13 m)	218 lb (99 kg)	Oct 30, 2023
Alier Maluk; F	Recruit ratings: Rivals: 247Sports: ESPN: (82)				
Christian Nitu; F	Whitby, Canada	Fort Erie International	6 ft 11 in (2.11 m)	220 lb (100 kg)	Apr 17, 2024
Christian Nitu; F	Recruit ratings: Rivals: 247Sports: ESPN: (NR)				
Anastasios Rozakeas; G/F	Athens, Greece	Lyceum Senior	6 ft 7 in (2.01 m)	225 lb (102 kg)	
Anastasios Rozakeas; G/F	Recruit ratings: Rivals: 247Sports: ESPN: (NR)				
A.J. Swinton #45 SF	Arlington, VA	Bishop O'Connell High School	6 ft 5 in (1.96 m)	180 lb (82 kg)	Aug 3, 2023
A.J. Swinton #45 SF	Recruit ratings: Rivals: 247Sports: ESPN: (80)				
Overall recruit ranking: 247Sports: 46
Note: In many cases, Scout, Rivals, 247Sports, On3, and ESPN may conflict in their listings of height and weight.; In these cases, the average was taken. ESPN grades are on a 100-point scale.; Sources: "Florida State Seminoles". ESPN.; "2024 Team Ranking". Rivals.

== Roster ==
2024–25 Florida State Seminoles men's basketball team
Players
Coaches

Pos.	#	Name	Height	Weight	Year	Previous school	Hometown
G	0	Chandler Jackson	6 ft 5 in (1.96 m)	220 lb (100 kg)	Jr	Christian Brothers	Memphis, TN
F	1	Jamir Watkins	6 ft 7 in (2.01 m)	210 lb (95 kg)	RS Sr	Trenton Catholic; VCU	Trenton, NJ
G	4	Jason Simpson (W)	5 ft 10 in (1.78 m)	155 lb (70 kg)	Sr	Montverde Academy; St. John's	West Palm Beach, FL
F	10	Taylor Bol Bowen	6 ft 10 in (2.08 m)	195 lb (88 kg)	So	Brewster Academy	Jericho, VT
F	35	Alhagie Waka Mbatch (W)	6 ft 10 in (2.08 m)	203 lb (92 kg)	So	KOTU Sr Secondary School	Serekunda, Gambia
G	40	Isaac Spainhour (W)	6 ft 3 in (1.91 m)	180 lb (82 kg)	RS Jr	West Stokes	King, NC
G	43	Jesse Jones	6 ft 4 in (1.93 m)	195 lb (88 kg)	Sr	Montverde Academy; Boston College	Clermont, FL
F	19	AJ Swinton	6 ft 6 in (1.98 m)	200 lb (91 kg)	Fr	Bishop O'Connell	Cabin John, Maryland
G/F	9	Anastasios Rozakeas	6 ft 7 in (2.01 m)	225 lb (102 kg)	Fr	Lyceum Senior	Athens, Greece
F	11	Christian Nitu	6 ft 11 in (2.11 m)	220 lb (100 kg)	Fr	Fort Erie International	Whitby, Canada
F	21	Alier Maluk	7 ft 0 in (2.13 m)	218 lb (99 kg)	Fr	Long Island Lutheran	Baldwin, PA
G	3	Bostyn Holt	6 ft 7 in (2.01 m)	200 lb (91 kg)	Sr	Roosevelt; South Dakota	Portland, OR
F	12	Malique Ewin	6 ft 11 in (2.11 m)	230 lb (104 kg)	Jr	Berkmar; Ole Miss	Lawrenceville, GA
F	7	Jerry Deng	6 ft 9 in (2.06 m)	220 lb (100 kg)	So	Norcross; Hampton	Rochester, NY
G	5	Daquan Davis	6 ft 1 in (1.85 m)	176 lb (80 kg)	Fr	St. John's	Baltimore, MD
G	25	Justin Thomas	6 ft 7 in (2.01 m)	184 lb (83 kg)	Jr	Baton Rouge College High School	Baton Rouge, LA
G	15	Jalen Crawford	6 ft 0 in (1.83 m)	145 lb (66 kg)	Fr	Maclay School	Tallahassee, FL

Head coach

- Leonard Hamilton (UT Martin)

Assistant coach(es)

- Stan Jones (Memphis)
- Kevin Nickelberry (Virginia Wesleyan)
- Jake Morton (Miami (FL))

Legend

- (C) Team captain
- (S) Suspended
- (I) Ineligible
- (W) Walk-on
- Injured
- Current redshirt

Roster

== Schedule and results ==
Date time, TV	Rank^{#}	Opponent^{#}	Result	Record	High points	High rebounds	High assists	Site (attendance) city, state Source:
Exhibition
October 24, 2024*; 7:00 p.m., ESPN+		Saint Leo	W 87–64	–	19 – Ewin	5 – Ewin	4 – Tied	Donald L. Tucker Center (–); Tallahassee, FL
October 31, 2024*; 3:00 p.m., ESPN+		West Florida	W 100–56	–	14 – Tied	8 – Bowen	6 – Watkins	Donald L. Tucker Center (–); Tallahassee, FL
Regular season
November 4, 2024*; 7:00 p.m., ACCNX/ESPN+		Northern Kentucky	W 74–62	1–0	17 – Tied	6 – Bowen	4 – Holt	Donald L. Tucker Center (4,872); Tallahassee, FL
November 9, 2024*; 7:00 p.m., ESPN+		vs. Rice; Battleground 2K	W 73–65	2–0	30 – Watkins	7 – Tied	2 – Tied	Toyota Center (6,901); Houston, TX
November 12, 2024*; 7:00 p.m., ACCNX/ESPN+		Tarleton State	W 72–52	3–0	9 – Davis	5 – Tied	3 – Tied	Donald L. Tucker Center (3,068); Tallahassee, FL
November 15, 2024*; 6:00 p.m., ACCN		No. 20 Florida; Rivalry	L 74–87	3–1	19 – Watkins	7 – Tied	2 – Tied	Donald L. Tucker Center (9,797); Tallahassee, FL
November 19, 2024*; 7:00 p.m., ACCNX/ESPN+		Hofstra	W 79–61	4–1	17 – Watkins	6 – Tied	3 – Tied	Donald L. Tucker Center (3,253); Tallahassee, FL
November 22, 2024*; 5:00 p.m., ESPN+		vs. Temple; Hall of Fame Tip-Off	W 78–69	5–1	19 – Watkins	9 – Ewin	3 – Davis	Mohegan Sun Arena (2,176); Uncasville, CT
November 24, 2024*; 3:30 p.m., ESPN2		vs. UMass; Hall of Fame Tip-Off	W 92–59	6–1	17 – Ewin	7 – Ewin	6 – Jackson	Mohegan Sun Arena (1); Uncasville, CT
November 26, 2024*; 7:00 p.m., ACCNX/ESPN+		Western Carolina	W 92–57	7–1	19 – Davis	4 – Tied	4 – Watkins	Donald L. Tucker Center (2,589); Tallahassee, FL
December 3, 2024*; 9:00 p.m., SECN		at LSU; ACC–SEC Challenge	L 75–85	7–2	17 – Ewin	17 – Ewin	3 – Jackson	Pete Maravich Assembly Center (8,323); Baton Rouge, LA
December 7, 2024; 4:00 p.m., ESPNU		at NC State	L 74–84 ^{OT}	7–3 (0–1)	24 – Watkins	9 – Ewin	3 – Watkins	Lenovo Center (12,577); Raleigh, NC
December 14, 2024*; 4:30 p.m., ACCN		vs. Tulane; Orange Bowl Basketball Classic	W 77–64	8–3	29 – Watkins	8 – Ewin	5 – Tied	Amerant Bank Arena (7,866); Sunrise, FL
December 17, 2024*; 7:00 p.m., ACCNX/ESPN+		Winthrop	W 82–64	9–3	23 – Watkins	15 – Ewin	4 – Tied	Donald L. Tucker Center (4,354); Tallahassee, FL
December 21, 2024; 2:00 p.m., The CW		Louisville	L 76–90	9–4 (0–2)	25 – Watkins	3 – Tied	4 – Jackson	Donald L. Tucker Center (4,383); Tallahassee, FL
January 4, 2025; 6:00 p.m., ACCN		Syracuse	W 90–74	10–4 (1–2)	18 – Davis	10 – Bowen	3 – Tied	Donald L. Tucker Center (4,941); Tallahassee, FL
January 8, 2025; 7:00 p.m., ACCN		at Miami (FL)	W 80–65	11–4 (2–2)	20 – Ewin	10 – Ewin	10 – Davis	Watsco Center (6,597); Coral Gables, FL
January 11, 2025; 2:00 p.m., ACCN		at Clemson	L 57–77	11–5 (2–3)	15 – Ewin	9 – Ewin	5 – Davis	Littlejohn Coliseum (9,341); Clemson, SC
January 15, 2025; 9:00 p.m., ESPNU		Pittsburgh	W 82–70	12–5 (3–3)	26 – Watkins	13 – Ewin	4 – Jackson	Donald L. Tucker Center (5,784); Tallahassee, FL
January 18, 2025; 12:00 p.m., ESPNU		Georgia Tech	W 91–78	13–5 (4–3)	20 – Bowen	11 – Ewin	5 – Thomas	Donald L. Tucker Center (6,751); Tallahassee, FL
January 22, 2025; 9:00 p.m., ACCN		at California	L 68–77	13–6 (4–4)	18 – Watkins	10 – Ewin	3 – Watkins	Haas Pavilion (3,082); Berkeley, CA
January 25, 2025; 7:00 p.m., ACCN		at Stanford	L 71–78	13–7 (4–5)	20 – Watkins	8 – Watkins	3 – Ewin	Maples Pavilion (3,837); Stanford, CA
January 29, 2025; 7:00 p.m., ACCN		Virginia Tech	L 66–76	13–8 (4–6)	14 – Bowen	9 – Bowen	4 – Davis	Donald L. Tucker Center (6,448); Tallahassee, FL
February 1, 2025; 2:00 p.m., ACCN		at Boston College	L 76–77	13–9 (4–7)	19 – Watkins	9 – Ewin	5 – Davis	Conte Forum (6,083); Chestnut Hill, MA
February 4, 2025; 7:00 p.m., ACCN		Notre Dame	W 67–60	14–9 (5–7)	21 – Watkins	10 – Ewin	3 – Tied	Donald L. Tucker Center (5,101); Tallahassee, FL
February 12, 2025; 7:00 p.m., ESPNU		at Wake Forest	W 72–70	15–9 (6–7)	15 – Tied	12 – Ewin	4 – Jackson	Lawrence Joel Veterans Memorial Coliseum (8,356); Winston-Salem, NC
February 15, 2025; 12:00 p.m., The CW		No. 23 Clemson	L 46–72	15–10 (6–8)	14 – Watkins	7 – Tied	2 – Davis	Donald L. Tucker Center (6,278); Tallahassee, FL
February 19, 2025; 9:00 p.m., ACCN		Miami (FL)	W 74–66	16–10 (7–8)	24 – Ewin	8 – Watkins	3 – Tied	Donald L. Tucker Center (7,565); Tallahassee, FL
February 22, 2025; 12:00 p.m., The CW		at No. 25 Louisville	L 81–89	16–11 (7–9)	23 – Watkins	9 – Ewin	3 – Watkins	KFC Yum! Center (16,473); Louisville, KY
February 24, 2025; 7:00 p.m., ESPN		North Carolina	L 85–96	16–12 (7–10)	26 – Watkins	3 – Tied	4 – Thomas	Donald L. Tucker Center (7,922); Tallahassee, FL
March 1, 2025; 7:00 p.m., ACCN		at No. 2 Duke	L 65–100	16–13 (7–11)	21 – Watkins	8 – Watkins	3 – Watkins	Cameron Indoor Stadium (9,314); Durham, NC
March 4, 2025; 9:00 p.m., ACCN		at Virginia	L 57–60	16–14 (7–12)	18 – Watkins	8 – Watkins	5 – Watkins	John Paul Jones Arena (13,503); Charlottesville, VA
March 8, 2025; 4:00 p.m., ESPNU		SMU	W 76–69	17–14 (8–12)	26 – Ewin	8 – Tied	5 – Watkins	Donald L. Tucker Center (5,619); Tallahassee, FL
ACC Tournament
March 11, 2025; 7:00 p.m., ACCN	(11)	vs. (14) Syracuse; First round	L 62–66	17–15	16 – Watkins	11 – Watkins	3 – Watkins	Spectrum Center (5,136); Charlotte, NC
*Non-conference game. ^{#}Rankings from AP poll. (#) Tournament seedings in parentheses. All times are in Eastern Time.

== Rankings ==
Ranking movements Legend: ██ Increase in ranking ██ Decrease in ranking — = Not ranked RV = Received votes
	Week																				
Poll	Pre	1	2	3	4	5	6	7	8	9	10	11	12	13	14	15	16	17	18	19	Final
AP	—	—	—	RV	RV	—	—	—	—	—	—	—	—	—	—	—	—	—	—	—	—
Coaches	—	—	—	—	—	—	—	—	—	—	—	—	—	—	—	—	—	—	—	—	—

== Awards ==
Honors
Player	Award	Ref.
Jamir Watkins	Pre-season All-ACC Second Team; ACC Co-Player of the Week (Week One); All-ACC Second Team; Orange Bowl Classic MVP	

== NBA draft ==
Round	Pick (Overall)	Name	Team
2nd	43	Jamir Watkins	Washington Wizards
