= 2024–25 Wake Forest Demon Deacons men's basketball team =

American college basketball season

2024–25 Wake Forest Demon Deacons men's basketball
- Conference: Atlantic Coast Conference
- Record: 21–11 (13–7 ACC)
- Head coach: Steve Forbes (5th season)
- Assistant coaches: BJ McKie; Matt Woodley; Jason Shay; Antanas Kavaliauskas
- Home arena: LJVM Coliseum

2024–25 ACC men's basketball standings
	Conf.				Overall
Team	W		L	PCT	W		L	PCT
No. 3 Duke †	19	–	1	.950	35	–	4	.897
No. 21 Louisville	18	–	2	.900	27	–	8	.771
No. 22 Clemson	18	–	2	.900	27	–	7	.794
Wake Forest	13	–	7	.650	21	–	11	.656
North Carolina	13	–	7	.650	23	–	14	.622
SMU	13	–	7	.650	24	–	11	.686
Stanford	11	–	9	.550	21	–	14	.600
Georgia Tech	10	–	10	.500	17	–	17	.500
Virginia	8	–	12	.400	15	–	17	.469
Virginia Tech	8	–	12	.400	13	–	19	.406
Florida State	8	–	12	.400	17	–	15	.531
Notre Dame	8	–	12	.400	15	–	18	.455
Pittsburgh	8	–	12	.400	17	–	15	.531
Syracuse	7	–	13	.350	14	–	19	.424
California	6	–	14	.300	14	–	19	.424
NC State	5	–	15	.250	12	–	19	.387
Boston College	4	–	16	.200	12	–	19	.387
Miami (FL)	3	–	17	.150	7	–	24	.226
† 2025 ACC tournament winner Rankings from AP poll

The 2024–25 Wake Forest Demon Deacons men's basketball team represented Wake Forest University during the 2024–25 NCAA Division I men's basketball season. The Demon Deacons, led by fifth-year head coach Steve Forbes, played their home games at the Lawrence Joel Veterans Memorial Coliseum in Winston-Salem, North Carolina as members of the Atlantic Coast Conference.

The Demon Deacons won their first four games of the season, the highlight of which, was a 72–70 victory over Michigan at a neutral site. Their first loss came in the Skip Prosser Classic against Xavier, 75–60. They won two games before traveling to Florida to participate in the ESPN Events Invitational. The team lost to eighteenth ranked Florida in the semifinals before defeating Minnesota to finish in third place. They then traveled to College Station to face twenty-second ranked Texas A&M in the ACC–SEC Challenge, where they lost 57–44. The Demon Deacons won eight of their next nine games, with the only loss coming at twenty-fifth ranked Clemson. The run also included seven ACC wins, with a rivalry victory over NC State and another rivalry defeat of North Carolina. The streak ended with back-to-back losses against ranked teams: second-ranked Duke and twenty-first ranked Louisville. They won their next three games, including a two-point victory over Pittsburgh and two victories on a trip to California. They lost 72–70 against Florida State on their return to the east coast. The Demon Deacons went 3–3 in their final six games with defeats of SMU, Notre Dame, and Georgia Tech. Their defeats over the stretch included a rivalry loss to NC State, a loss to Virginia, and another loss against second-ranked Duke.

The Demon Deacons finished the season 21–11 and 13–7 in ACC play to finish in a three-way tie for fourth place. Wake Forest finished atop the tiebreaking procedure and was the fourth seed in the 2025 ACC tournament. As the fourth seed, they earned a bye into the quarterfinals where they lost to rivals North Carolina 68–59. They were not invited to the NCAA tournament and declined an invitation to the NIT.

== Previous season ==
The Demon Deacons finished the season 21–14 overall and 11–9 in ACC play to finish in a three-way tie for fifth place. After winning both tiebreakers, they were awarded the fifth seed in the ACC tournament. They received a bye into the second round where they defeated twelfth seed Notre Dame, avenging a loss from the regular season. They lost to fourth seed Pittsburgh in the quarterfinals. They received an at-large bid to the National Invitation Tournament and were a first seed. They defeated Appalachian State in the first round before losing to fourth-seed Georgia in the second round to end their season.

== Offseason ==
=== Departures ===
Departures
Name	Number	Pos.	Height	Weight	Year	Hometown	Reason for departure
Kevin Miller	0	G	6'0"	175	(redshirt) Sophomore	Chicago, Illinois	Transferred to SMU
Abramo Canka	10	G	6'6"	200	Sophomore	Genoa, Italy	Transferred to Stetson
Andrew Carr	11	F	6'11"	230	Senior	West Chester, Pennsylvania	Transferred to Kentucky
Aaron Clark	13	G	6'6"	195	Freshman	Easton, Pennsylvania	Transferred to Pepperdine
Zach Keller	25	F	6'10"	228	Sophomore	Highlands Ranch, Colorado	Transferred to Utah
Damari Monsanto	30	G	6'6"	225	(redshirt) Senior	Pembroke Pines, Florida	Graduated
Jao Ituka	31	G	6'1"	196	Junior	Gaithersburg, Maryland	Transferred to Jacksonville State
Matthew Marsh	33	C	7'1"	240	Junior	Cornwall, England	Transferred to Oregon State

=== Incoming transfers ===
Incoming transfers
Name	Number	Pos.	Height	Weight	Year	Hometown	Previous school
Omaha Biliew	0	F	6'8"	225	Sophomore	Denison, Iowa	Iowa State
Davin Cosby	1	G	6'5"	205	Sophomore	Richmond, Virginia	Alabama
Ty-Laur Johnson	8	G	6'0"	160	Sophomore	Brooklyn, New York	Louisville
Tre'Von Spillers	25	F	6'7"	205	Senior	Charleston, South Carolina	Appalachian State
Churchill Abass	55	C/F	6'9"	250	Sophomore	Edo State, Nigeria	DePaul

=== 2024 recruiting class ===
College recruiting
Name	Hometown	School	Height	Weight	Commit date
Juke Harris #23 SG	Salisbury, NC	Salisbury High School	6 ft 3 in (1.91 m)	185 lb (84 kg)	Mar 24, 2023
Juke Harris #23 SG	Recruit ratings: Rivals: 247Sports: ESPN: (85)				
Mason Hagedorn; PF	Huntington, WV	Huntington Prep	6 ft 8 in (2.03 m)	220 lb (100 kg)	
Mason Hagedorn; PF	Recruit ratings: Rivals: 247Sports: ESPN: (NR)				
Overall recruit ranking:
Note: In many cases, Scout, Rivals, 247Sports, On3, and ESPN may conflict in their listings of height and weight.; In these cases, the average was taken. ESPN grades are on a 100-point scale.; Sources: "Wake Forest Demon Deacons". ESPN.; "2024 Team Ranking". Rivals.

== Roster ==
2024–25 Wake Forest Demon Deacons men's basketball team
Players
Coaches

Pos.	#	Name	Height	Weight	Year	Previous school	Hometown
F	0	Omaha Biliew	6 ft 8 in (2.03 m)	225 lb (102 kg)	So	Waukee; Iowa State	Waukee, IA
G	1	Davin Cosby Jr.	6 ft 5 in (1.96 m)	205 lb (93 kg)	So	Word of God Christian Academy; Alabama	Richmond, VA
G	2	Juke Harris	6 ft 7 in (2.01 m)	185 lb (84 kg)	Fr	Salisbury	Salisbury, NC
F/C	4	Efton Reid	7 ft 0 in (2.13 m)	240 lb (109 kg)	Sr	IMG Academy; Gonzaga	Richmond, VA
G	6	Cameron Hildreth	6 ft 4 in (1.93 m)	195 lb (88 kg)	Sr	Surrey Scorchers	Worthing, England
G	7	Parker Friedrichsen	6 ft 4 in (1.93 m)	180 lb (82 kg)	So	Bixby	Bixby, OK
G	8	Ty-Laur Johnson	6 ft 0 in (1.83 m)	160 lb (73 kg)	So	Our Saviour Lutheran; Louisville	Brooklyn, NY
F	1	Marqus Marion	6 ft 9 in (2.06 m)	215 lb (98 kg)	So	BMS Herlev	Skovlunde, Denmark
F	20	Mason Hagedorn	6 ft 10 in (2.08 m)	221 lb (100 kg)	Fr	Huntington Prep	Charlotte, NC
G	23	Hunter Sallis	6 ft 5 in (1.96 m)	180 lb (82 kg)	Sr	Millard North; Gonzaga	Omaha, NE
F	25	Tre'Von Spillers	6 ft 7 in (2.01 m)	205 lb (93 kg)	Sr	Military Magnet Academy; Appalachian State	Charleston, SC
G	40	RJ Kennah (W)	6 ft 5 in (1.96 m)	195 lb (88 kg)	Sr	Kent Denver	Parker, CO
F	55	Owen Kmety (W)	6 ft 6 in (1.98 m)	180 lb (82 kg)	Jr	La Lumiere School	Chicago, IL
F	45	Vincent Ricchiuti (W)	6 ft 6 in (1.98 m)	195 lb (88 kg)	So	St. Augustine	San Diego, CA
G	51	Kevin Dunn (W)	6 ft 2 in (1.88 m)	205 lb (93 kg)	Sr	Choate Rosemary Hall	Winston-Salem, NC
G	52	Will Underwood (W)	6 ft 3 in (1.91 m)	180 lb (82 kg)	So	Mahtomedi	Mahtomedi, MN
C	55	Churchill Abass	6 ft 9 in (2.06 m)	250 lb (113 kg)	So	NBA Academy Africa; DePaul	Edo State, Nigeria

Head coach

- Steve Forbes (Southern Arkansas University)

Assistant coach(es)

- BJ McKie (South Carolina)
- Matt Woodley (Drake)
- Jason Shay (Western Illinois)
- Antanas Kavaliauskas (Texas A&M)

Legend

- (C) Team captain
- (S) Suspended
- (I) Ineligible
- (W) Walk-on
- Injured
- Current redshirt

Roster
Last update: August 13, 2024

== Schedule and results ==
Date time, TV	Rank^{#}	Opponent^{#}	Result	Record	High points	High rebounds	High assists	Site (attendance) city, state
Exhibition
October 18, 2024*; 8:00 p.m., YouTube		vs. No. 2 Alabama	L 77–98	—	16 – Sallis	6 – Spillers	4 – Tied	Boutwell Memorial Auditorium (2,068); Birmingham, AL
Regular season
November 4, 2024*; 8:00 p.m., ACCNX/ESPN+		Coppin State	W 64–49	1–0	15 – Hildreth	9 – Spillers	5 – Sallis	LJVM Coliseum (8,956); Winston-Salem, NC
November 7, 2024*; 7:00 p.m., ACCNX/ESPN+		North Carolina A&T	W 80–64	2–0	15 – Spillers	16 – Spillers	3 – Tied	LJVM Coliseum (8,829); Winston-Salem, NC
November 10, 2024*; 1:00 p.m., ESPN2		vs. Michigan; Deacon-Wolverine Challenge	W 72–70	3–0	18 – Sallis	10 – Reid	7 – Hildreth	Greensboro Coliseum (8,905); Greensboro, NC
November 13, 2024*; 7:00 p.m., ACCNX/ESPN+		USC Upstate	W 85–80	4–0	23 – Sallis	8 – Reid	6 – Sallis	LJVM Coliseum (8,482); Winston-Salem, NC
November 16, 2024*; 12:00 p.m., FS1		at Xavier; Skip Prosser Classic	L 60–75	4–1	16 – Sallis	9 – Spillers	5 – Sallis	Cintas Center (10,455); Cincinnati, OH
November 19, 2024*; 7:00 p.m., ACCN		Western Carolina	W 82–69	5–1	20 – Sallis	5 – Spillers	6 – Hildreth	LJVM Coliseum (8,468); Winston-Salem, NC
November 23, 2024*; 4:00 p.m., ACCNX/ESPN+		Detroit Mercy	W 67–57	6–1	31 – Sallis	9 – Spillers	4 – Sallis	LJVM Coliseum (8,705); Winston-Salem, NC
November 28, 2024*; 2:30 p.m., ESPNU		vs. No. 18 Florida; ESPN Events Invitational semifinals	L 58–75	6–2	15 – Tied	13 – Spillers	3 – Tied	State Farm Field House (3,191); Kissimmee, FL
November 29, 2024*; 12:00 p.m., ESPN2		vs. Minnesota; ESPN Events Invitational consolation game	W 57–51	7–2	18 – Spillers	16 – Spillers	4 – Johnson	State Farm Field House; Kissimmee, FL
December 3, 2024*; 9:00 p.m., ESPN2		at No. 22 Texas A&M; ACC–SEC Challenge	L 44–57	7–3	19 – Sallis	11 – Reid III	6 – Hildreth	Reed Arena (8,833); College Station, TX
December 7, 2024; 12:00 p.m., ACCN		Boston College	W 72–66	8–3 (1–0)	22 – Hildreth	10 – Hildreth	4 – Johnson	LJVM Coliseum (10,254); Winston-Salem, NC
December 17, 2024*; 7:00 p.m., ACCNX/ESPN+		James Madison	W 75–58	9–3	27 – Sallis	12 – Sallis	5 – Sallis	LJVM Coliseum (7,463); Winston-Salem, NC
December 21, 2024; 2:30 p.m., ESPN		at No. 25 Clemson	L 62–73	9–4 (1–1)	26 – Sallis	8 – Reid	2 – Sallis	Littlejohn Coliseum (6,889); Clemson, SC
December 31, 2024; 2:00 p.m., ESPN2		at Syracuse	W 81–71	10–4 (2–1)	23 – Sallis	10 – Spillers	4 – Sallis	JMA Wireless Dome (14,437); Syracuse, NY
January 4, 2025; 12:00 p.m., The CW		NC State; Rivalry	W 77–59	11–4 (3–1)	20 – Sallis	5 – Tied	4 – Tied	LJVM Coliseum (9,633); Winston-Salem, NC
January 11, 2025; 5:15 p.m., The CW		at Miami (FL)	W 88–78	12–4 (4–1)	31 – Hildreth	5 – Tied	6 – Johnson	Watsco Center (6,420); Coral Gables, FL
January 15, 2025; 6:30 p.m., ESPNews		Stanford	W 80–67	13–4 (5–1)	30 – Sallis	10 – Spillers	3 – Tied	LJVM Coliseum (9,685); Winston-Salem, NC
January 18, 2025; 2:00 p.m., ACCN		at Virginia Tech	W 72–63	14–4 (6–1)	24 – Sallis	7 – Tied	3 – Johnson	Cassell Coliseum (8,925); Blacksburg, VA
January 21, 2025; 9:00 p.m., ESPN		North Carolina; Rivalry	W 67–66	15–4 (7–1)	20 – Hildreth	9 – Tied	2 – Tied	LJVM Coliseum (12,799); Winston-Salem, NC
January 25, 2025; 4:30 p.m., ESPN		No. 2 Duke	L 56–63	15–5 (7–2)	14 – Harris	7 – Sallis	8 – Johnson	LJVM Coliseum (13,169); Winston-Salem, NC
January 28, 2025; 7:00 p.m., ACCN		at No. 21 Louisville	L 59–72	15–6 (7–3)	13 – Sallis	13 – Reid	3 – Spillers	KFC Yum! Center (14,533); Louisville, KY
February 1, 2025; 12:00 p.m., ESPN2		Pittsburgh	W 76–74	16–6 (8–3)	24 – Hildreth	6 – Reid	5 – Johnson	LJVM Coliseum (10,787); Winston-Salem, NC
February 5, 2025; 11:00 p.m., ESPNU		at Stanford	W 79–73	17–6 (9–3)	22 – Hildreth	7 – Sallis	5 – Sallis	Maples Pavilion (2,774); Stanford, CA
February 8, 2025; 5:00 p.m., ACCN		at California	W 76–66	18–6 (10–3)	23 – Hildreth	8 – Sallis	6 – Johnson	Haas Pavilion (4,562); Berkeley, CA
February 12, 2025; 7:00 p.m., ESPNU		Florida State	L 70–72	18–7 (10–4)	22 – Hildreth	10 – Reid	4 – Spillers	LJVM Coliseum (8,356); Winston-Salem, NC
February 15, 2025; 6:00 p.m., ACCN		at SMU	W 77–66	19–7 (11–4)	20 – Sallis	11 – Spillers	6 – Sallis	Moody Coliseum (6,858); Dallas, TX
February 22, 2025; 2:00 p.m., ESPN2		at NC State; Rivalry	L 73–85	19–8 (11–5)	16 – Hildreth	9 – Sallis	4 – Sallis	Lenovo Center (15,118); Raleigh, NC
February 26, 2025; 9:00 p.m., ESPNU		Virginia	L 75–83	19–9 (11–6)	25 – Sallis	10 – Reid	3 – Tied	LJVM Coliseum (7,851); Winston-Salem, NC
March 1, 2025; 5:30 p.m., The CW		Notre Dame	W 74–71	20–9 (12–6)	28 – Hildreth	7 – Reid	4 – Johnson	LJVM Coliseum (10,298); Winston-Salem, NC
March 3, 2025; 7:00 p.m., ESPN		at No. 2 Duke	L 60–93	20–10 (12–7)	14 – Tied	11 – Spillers	2 – Tied	Cameron Indoor Stadium (9,314); Durham, NC
March 8, 2025; 12:00 p.m., The CW		Georgia Tech	W 69–43	21–10 (13–7)	14 – Hildreth	13 – Reid	4 – Tied	LJVM Coliseum (8,994); Winston-Salem, NC
ACC tournament
March 13, 2025; 2:30 p.m., ESPN	(4)	vs. (5) North Carolina; Quarterfinals / Rivalry	L 59–68	21–11	25 – Sallis	10 – Reid	2 – Tied	Spectrum Center (14,116); Charlotte, NC
*Non-conference game. ^{#}Rankings from AP poll. (#) Tournament seedings in parentheses. All times are in Eastern Time.

== Rankings ==
Ranking movements Legend: ██ Increase in ranking ██ Decrease in ranking — = Not ranked RV = Received votes
	Week																				
Poll	Pre	1	2	3	4	5	6	7	8	9	10	11	12	13	14	15	16	17	18	19	Final
AP	RV	RV	—	—	—	—	—	—	—	—	—	RV	—	—	—	—	—	—	—	—	—
Coaches	RV	RV	RV	—	—	—	—	—	—	—	—	—	—	—	—	—	—	—	—	—	—
