= 2024–25 NC State Wolfpack men's basketball team =

American college basketball season

2024–25 NC State Wolfpack men's basketball
- Conference: Atlantic Coast Conference
- Record: 12–19 (5–15 ACC)
- Head coach: Kevin Keatts (8th season)
- Assistant coaches: Kareem Richardson; Levi Watkins; Brett Nelson; Larry Dixon; Steve Snell
- Home arena: Lenovo Center

2024–25 ACC men's basketball standings
	Conf.				Overall
Team	W		L	PCT	W		L	PCT
No. 3 Duke †	19	–	1	.950	35	–	4	.897
No. 21 Louisville	18	–	2	.900	27	–	8	.771
No. 22 Clemson	18	–	2	.900	27	–	7	.794
Wake Forest	13	–	7	.650	21	–	11	.656
North Carolina	13	–	7	.650	23	–	14	.622
SMU	13	–	7	.650	24	–	11	.686
Stanford	11	–	9	.550	21	–	14	.600
Georgia Tech	10	–	10	.500	17	–	17	.500
Virginia	8	–	12	.400	15	–	17	.469
Virginia Tech	8	–	12	.400	13	–	19	.406
Florida State	8	–	12	.400	17	–	15	.531
Notre Dame	8	–	12	.400	15	–	18	.455
Pittsburgh	8	–	12	.400	17	–	15	.531
Syracuse	7	–	13	.350	14	–	19	.424
California	6	–	14	.300	14	–	19	.424
NC State	5	–	15	.250	12	–	19	.387
Boston College	4	–	16	.200	12	–	19	.387
Miami (FL)	3	–	17	.150	7	–	24	.226
† 2025 ACC tournament winner Rankings from AP poll

The 2024–25 NC State Wolfpack men's basketball team represented North Carolina State University during the 2024–25 NCAA Division I men's basketball season. The Wolfpack were led by eighth-year head coach Kevin Keatts and played their home games at Lenovo Center in Raleigh, North Carolina as members of the Atlantic Coast Conference (ACC).

The Wolfpack started the season well with five straight wins over non-Power 4 opponents before traveling to San Diego, California to participate in the Rady Children's Invitational. They faced their first Power-4 team there in thirteenth-ranked Purdue. They lost 71–61 and moved to the third place game where they faced BYU. The Wolfpack lost this game 72–61 to finish fourth in the tournament. They returned home to face Texas in the ACC–SEC Challenge when they lost 63–59. They ended their losing streak with a win in their ACC opener over Florida State in overtime. The Wolfpack went 2–1 in their final non-conference games, defeating Coppin State and Rider but losing at tenth-ranked Kansas. The Wolfpack lost their next two ACC games, one by three points at Virginia and by eighteen points to rival Wake Forest. They ended the losing streak with a one point win over Notre Dame. The Wolfpack couldn't gather any momentum from that win as they went on to lose their next nine games. They only faced one ranked team during the stretch, number two Duke. The team had numerous close losses during the run, only losing a rivalry game against North Carolina by two points, losing to Virginia Tech and California by three, and losing by just one at Stanford. The Wolfpack would slightly recover in the home stretch, going 3–4 over their last seven games. They defeated Wake Forest, Boston College and Pittsburgh. However, they lost to North Carolina, Syracuse, Georgia Tech, and by just two points to Miami on the final day of the season.

The Wolfpack finished the season 12–19 and 5–15 in ACC play to finish in sixteenth place. Under the new ACC tournament rules, they did not qualify for the 2025 ACC tournament and were unable to defend their tournament title. They were not invited to the NCAA tournament or the NIT. After the season, head coach Kevin Keatts was fired just one year after leading the team to the Final Four.

== Previous season ==
The Wolfpack finished the 2023–24 season 26–15, 9–11 in ACC play to finish in tenth place. miraculous run in the ACC tournament, winning five games in the span of five days (including a victory over ACC regular season champion and rival North Carolina) to win their first ACC tournament since 1987. They received an automatic bid to the NCAA tournament as the No. 11 seed in the South region. There they defeated #6 Texas Tech in the first round, #14 Oakland in overtime in the second round, #2 Marquette in the Sweet Sixteen, and their ACC rivals #4 Duke in the Elite Eight. The Wolfpack made their first Final Four appearance since 1983 as a result, having won nine straight games since the end of the regular season. They became the sixth #11 seed to reach the Final Four and the first since UCLA in 2021. Their miraculous run came to an end with a Final Four loss to Purdue.

== Offseason ==
=== Departures ===
Departures
Name	Number	Pos.	Height	Weight	Year	Hometown	Reason for departure
DJ Horne	0	G	6'2"	180	Graduate Student	Raleigh, North Carolina	Graduated
Kam Woods	2	G	6'2"	185	Junior	Bessemer, Alabama	Entered transfer portal
MJ Rice	3	G	6'5"	215	Sophomore	Henderson, North Carolina	Stepped away from basketball
LJ Thomas	4	G	6'2"	205	Sophomore	Plant City, Florida	Entered transfer portal
Casey Morsell	14	G	6'3"	200	Graduate Student	Fort Washington, Maryland	Graduated
Alex Nunnally	20	G	6'2"	180	Junior	Cary, North Carolina	Entered transfer portal
Mohamed Diarra	23	F	6'10"	215	Junior	Paris, France	Signed professional contract with Los Angeles Lakers
D. J. Burns	30	F	6'9"	275	Graduate Student	Rock Hill, South Carolina	Graduated

=== Incoming transfers ===
Incoming transfers
Name	Number	Pos.	Height	Weight	Year	Hometown	Previous school
Mike James	0	G/F	6'6"	220	(redshirt) Junior	Orlando, Florida	Louisville
Brandon Huntley-Hatfield	1	F	6'10"	240	Senior	Clarksville, Tennessee	Louisville
Dontrez Styles	3	G/F	6'6"	210	Senior	Kinston, North Carolina	Georgetown
Marcus Hill	10	G	6'4"	185	Junior	Rockford, Illinois	Bowling Green

=== 2024 recruiting class ===
College recruiting
Name	Hometown	School	Height	Weight	Commit date
Paul McNeil #15 SF	Rockingham, NC	Richmond Senior High School	6 ft 5 in (1.96 m)	180 lb (82 kg)	Feb 20, 2023
Paul McNeil #15 SF	Recruit ratings: Rivals: 247Sports: ESPN: (87)				
Tremayne Parker #26 SG	Atlanta, GA	Overtime Elite	6 ft 1 in (1.85 m)	166 lb (75 kg)	Nov 16, 2022
Tremayne Parker #26 SG	Recruit ratings: Rivals: 247Sports: ESPN: (82)				
Overall recruit ranking:
Note: In many cases, Scout, Rivals, 247Sports, On3, and ESPN may conflict in their listings of height and weight.; In these cases, the average was taken. ESPN grades are on a 100-point scale.; Sources: "2024 Team Ranking". Rivals.

== Roster ==
2024–25 NC State Wolfpack men's basketball team
Players
Coaches

Pos.	#	Name	Height	Weight	Year	Previous school	Hometown
G/F	0	Mike James	6 ft 6 in (1.98 m)	220 lb (100 kg)	RS Jr	Oak Ridge; Louisville	Orlando, FL
F	1	Brandon Huntley-Hatfield	6 ft 10 in (2.08 m)	240 lb (109 kg)	Sr	Scotland Campus Prep (PA); Louisville	Clarksville, TN
G	2	Paul McNeil	6 ft 5 in (1.96 m)	180 lb (82 kg)	Fr	Richmond Senior	Rockingham, NC
G/F	3	Dontrez Styles	6 ft 6 in (1.98 m)	210 lb (95 kg)	Sr	Kinston; Georgetown	Kinston, NC
G	4	Breon Pass	6 ft 0 in (1.83 m)	175 lb (79 kg)	Sr	Reidsville	Reidsville, NC
G	5	Trey Parker	6 ft 1 in (1.85 m)	165 lb (75 kg)	Fr	Overtime Elite	Fayetteville, NC
G	8	Jayden Taylor	6 ft 4 in (1.93 m)	195 lb (88 kg)	Sr	Perry Meridian; Butler	Indianapolis, IN
G	10	Marcus Hill	6 ft 4 in (1.93 m)	185 lb (84 kg)	Jr	Rockford Christian; Bowling Green	Rockford, IL
G	11	Dennis Parker Jr.	6 ft 6 in (1.98 m)	205 lb (93 kg)	So	John Marshall	Richmond, VA
G	12	Michael O'Connell	6 ft 2 in (1.88 m)	195 lb (88 kg)	GS	Blair Academy; Stanford	Mineola, NY
G	13	KJ Keatts (W)	5 ft 10 in (1.78 m)	165 lb (75 kg)	Jr	Grace Christian School	Cary, NC
G	22	Jordan Snell (W)	6 ft 2 in (1.88 m)	165 lb (75 kg)	Jr	Panther Creek	Cary, NC
F	24	Ernest Ross	6 ft 9 in (2.06 m)	200 lb (91 kg)	Sr	Santa Fe	Alachua, FL
F	34	Ben Middlebrooks	6 ft 10 in (2.08 m)	240 lb (109 kg)	Sr	Westminster Academy; Clemson	Fort Lauderdale, FL

Head coach

- Kevin Keatts (Ferrum)

Assistant coach(es)

- Kareem Richardson (Evansville)
- Levi Watkins (NC State)
- Brett Nelson (Florida)
- Larry Dixon (Johnson C. Smith)
- Steve Snell (Radford)

Legend

- (C) Team captain
- (S) Suspended
- (I) Ineligible
- (W) Walk-on
- Injured
- Current redshirt

Roster
Last update: August 7, 2024

== Schedule and results ==
Date time, TV	Rank^{#}	Opponent^{#}	Result	Record	High points	High rebounds	High assists	Site (attendance) city, state
Exhibition
October 30, 2024*; 7:00 p.m.		Lees–McRae	W 79–75	–	12 – Taylor	9 – Styles	5 – Taylor	Lenovo Center; Raleigh, NC
Regular season
November 4, 2024*; 7:00 p.m., ACCNX/ESPN+		USC Upstate	W 97–66	1–0	14 – Tied	10 – Middlebrooks	6 – O’Connell	Lenovo Center; Raleigh, NC
November 8, 2024*; 7:00 p.m., ACCNX/ESPN+		Presbyterian	W 81–72	2–0	19 – Taylor	7 – Styles	8 – O'Connell	Lenovo Center (12,949); Raleigh, NC
November 13, 2024*; 7:00 p.m., ACCNX/ESPN+		Coastal Carolina	W 82–70	3–0	22 – Taylor	6 – Styles	3 – Huntley-Hatfield	Lenovo Center (12,425); Raleigh, NC
November 18, 2024*; 7:00 p.m., ACCNX/ESPN+		Colgate	W 72–49	4–0	19 – Middlebrooks	11 – Styles	4 – O'Connell	Lenovo Center (11,692); Raleigh, NC
November 22, 2024*; 7:00 p.m., ACCNX/ESPN+		William & Mary	W 84–61	5–0	19 – Hill	9 – Huntley-Hatfield	3 – Tied	Lenovo Center (13,219); Raleigh, NC
November 28, 2024*; 3:00 p.m., FS1		vs. No. 13 Purdue; Rady Children's Invitational Semifinal	L 61–71	5–1	15 – Taylor	8 – Huntley-Hatfield	6 – O'Connell	LionTree Arena (4,000); San Diego, CA
November 29, 2024*; 3:30 p.m., FOX		vs. BYU; Rady Children's Invitational 3rd place game	L 61–72	5–2	16 – Tied	9 – Huntley-Hatfield	2 – Tied	LionTree Arena (4,000); San Diego, CA
December 4, 2024*; 9:15 p.m., ESPN2		Texas; ACC–SEC Challenge	L 59–63	5–3	17 – Styles	6 – O'Connell	7 – O'Connell	Lenovo Center (13,396); Raleigh, NC
December 7, 2024; 4:00 p.m., ESPNU		Florida State	W 84–74 ^{OT}	6–3 (1–0)	23 – Hill	6 – Hill	4 – O'Connell	Lenovo Center (12,577); Raleigh, NC
December 10, 2024*; 7:00 p.m., ACCNX/ESPN+		Coppin State	W 66–56	7–3	16 – Hill	7 – Styles	2 – Tied	Reynolds Coliseum (5,500); Raleigh, NC
December 14, 2024*; 3:15 p.m., ESPN		at No. 10 Kansas	L 60–75	7–4	14 – Middlebrooks	8 – Middlebrooks	3 – Huntley-Hatfield	Allen Fieldhouse (15,300); Lawrence, KS
December 22, 2024*; 4:00 p.m., ACCNX/ESPN+		Rider	W 89–63	8–4	16 – Taylor	5 – Parker Jr.	6 – Hill	Lenovo Center (14,289); Raleigh, NC
December 31, 2024; 12:00 p.m., ESPN2		at Virginia	L 67–70	8–5 (1–1)	14 – Taylor	8 – Hill	5 – Taylor	John Paul Jones Arena (13,875); Charlottesville, VA
January 4, 2025; 12:00 p.m., The CW		at Wake Forest; Rivalry	L 59–77	8–6 (1–2)	14 – Hill	10 – Styles	3 – Tied	LJVM Coliseum (9,633); Winston-Salem, NC
January 8, 2025; 7:00 p.m., ESPNU		Notre Dame	W 66–65	9–6 (2–2)	15 – Hill	7 – Styles	4 – Tied	Lenovo Center (13,515); Raleigh, NC
January 11, 2025; 4:00 p.m., ACCN		North Carolina; Rivalry	L 61–63	9–7 (2–3)	20 – Hill	14 – Middlebrooks	4 – O'Connell	Lenovo Center (19,500); Raleigh, NC
January 15, 2025; 7:00 p.m., ESPNU		at Virginia Tech	L 76–79	9–8 (2–4)	17 – Taylor	5 – Tied	5 – O'Connell	Cassell Coliseum (5,634); Blacksburg, VA
January 18, 2025; 6:00 p.m., ACCN		California	L 62–65	9–9 (2–5)	18 – Taylor	5 – Tied	2 – Tied	Lenovo Center (12,881); Raleigh, NC
January 25, 2025; 12:00 p.m., The CW		SMU	L 57–63	9–10 (2–6)	14 – Hill	6 – Taylor	3 – McNeil Jr.	Lenovo Center (12,728); Raleigh, NC
January 27, 2025; 8:30 p.m., ESPN		at No. 2 Duke	L 64–74	9–11 (2–7)	18 – Styles	6 – Hill	3 – Tied	Cameron Indoor Stadium (9,314); Durham, NC
February 1, 2025; 1:30 p.m., The CW		Clemson	L 58–68	9–12 (2–8)	24 – Styles	7 – Taylor	4 – Taylor	Lenovo Center (15,299); Raleigh, NC
February 5, 2025; 11:00 p.m., ACCN		at California	L 62–74	9–13 (2–9)	20 – Hill	10 – Styles	3 – O'Connell	Haas Pavilion (3,139); Berkeley, CA
February 8, 2025; 7:00 p.m., ACCN		at Stanford	L 73–74	9–14 (2–10)	19 – Parker	7 – Styles	5 – Parker	Maples Pavilion (4,841); Stanford, CA
February 12, 2025; 7:00 p.m., ESPN2		Louisville	L 66–91	9–15 (2–11)	13 – Parker	10 – Huntley-Hatfield	4 – Huntley-Hatfield	Lenovo Center (10,029); Raleigh, NC
February 15, 2025; 2:00 p.m., ACCN		Boston College	W 70–62	10–15 (3–11)	19 – Taylor	6 – Hill	6 – O'Connell	Lenovo Center (13,190); Raleigh, NC
February 19, 2025; 7:00 p.m., ESPN		at North Carolina; Rivalry	L 73–97	10–16 (3–12)	19 – Taylor	5 – Styles	3 – Middlebrooks	Dean Smith Center (21,750); Chapel Hill, NC
February 22, 2025; 2:00 p.m., ESPN2		Wake Forest; Rivalry	W 85–73	11–16 (4–12)	24 – McNeil Jr.	10 – Styles	13 – O'Connell	Lenovo Center (15,118); Raleigh, NC
February 26, 2025; 7:00 p.m., ESPNU		at Syracuse	L 60–74	11–17 (4–13)	17 – Styles	8 – Huntley-Hatfield	2 – Tied	JMA Wireless Dome (19,404); Syracuse, NY
March 1, 2025; 3:00 p.m., ACCN		at Georgia Tech	L 62–87	11–18 (4–14)	13 – Tied	6 – Middlebrooks	4 – Tied	McCamish Pavilion (4,491); Atlanta, GA
March 5, 2025; 7:00 p.m., ESPNews		Pittsburgh	W 71–63	12–18 (5–14)	15 – O'Connell	13 – Styles	8 – O'Connell	Lenovo Center (11,538); Raleigh, NC
March 8, 2025; 2:15 p.m., The CW		at Miami (FL)	L 70–72	12–19 (5–15)	24 – Styles	7 – Hill	4 – O'Connell	Watsco Center (2,541); Coral Gables, FL
*Non-conference game. ^{#}Rankings from AP poll. (#) Tournament seedings in parentheses. All times are in Eastern Time.
