= 2024–25 SMU Mustangs men's basketball team =

American college basketball season

2024–25 SMU Mustangs men's basketball
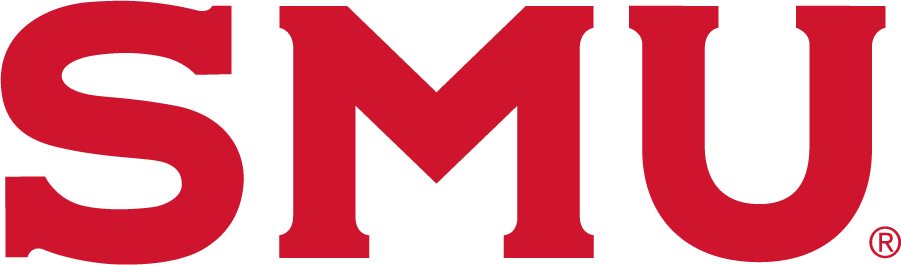

Acrisure Holiday Invitational champions

NIT, Second Round
- Conference: Atlantic Coast Conference
- Record: 24–11 (13–7 ACC)
- Head coach: Andy Enfield (1st season)
- Associate head coach: Chris Capko
- Assistant coaches: Jay Morris; Dana Ford; Eric Mobley; Kurt Karis
- Home arena: Moody Coliseum

2024–25 ACC men's basketball standings
	Conf.				Overall
Team	W		L	PCT	W		L	PCT
No. 3 Duke †	19	–	1	.950	35	–	4	.897
No. 21 Louisville	18	–	2	.900	27	–	8	.771
No. 22 Clemson	18	–	2	.900	27	–	7	.794
Wake Forest	13	–	7	.650	21	–	11	.656
North Carolina	13	–	7	.650	23	–	14	.622
SMU	13	–	7	.650	24	–	11	.686
Stanford	11	–	9	.550	21	–	14	.600
Georgia Tech	10	–	10	.500	17	–	17	.500
Virginia	8	–	12	.400	15	–	17	.469
Virginia Tech	8	–	12	.400	13	–	19	.406
Florida State	8	–	12	.400	17	–	15	.531
Notre Dame	8	–	12	.400	15	–	18	.455
Pittsburgh	8	–	12	.400	17	–	15	.531
Syracuse	7	–	13	.350	14	–	19	.424
California	6	–	14	.300	14	–	19	.424
NC State	5	–	15	.250	12	–	19	.387
Boston College	4	–	16	.200	12	–	19	.387
Miami (FL)	3	–	17	.150	7	–	24	.226
† 2025 ACC tournament winner Rankings from AP poll

The 2024–25 SMU Mustangs men's basketball team represented Southern Methodist University during the 2024–25 NCAA Division I men's basketball season. The Mustangs, led by first-year head coach Andy Enfield, played their home games at Moody Coliseum on their campus in University Park, Texas (Note: University Park and its neighbor of Highland Park form an enclave within Dallas known as the Park Cities. All locations within the Park Cities have a Dallas mailing address.) as first-year members of the Atlantic Coast Conference (ACC).

On March 21, 2024, the school fired head coach Rob Lanier after two seasons. On April 1, the school named USC head coach Andy Enfield the team's new head coach.

Enfield's tenure started with three wins over non-Power 4 opponents. The team then struggled before their Thanksgiving tournament, going 1–2 over three games, losing to Butler and Mississippi State while defeating Prairie View A&M. They traveled to Palm Springs to participate in the Acrisure Holiday Invitational. There they defeated Cal Baptist by two points and Washington State 77–60 to finish as tournament champions. This started a stretch where SMU won seven straight games. Other notable wins over this stretch included their ACC opener against Virginia, a neutral site victory over LSU and another ACC win over Boston College. Their streak was broken when fourth-ranked Duke defeated the team 89–62. The Mustangs also lost their next game against North Carolina before winning their next three games. Their streak was broken with a loss to twenty-fifth ranked Louisville. The Mustangs won their next five games to hold a 10–3 ACC record. The streitch included road wins over NC State and Virginia Tech, and wins over fellow ACC newcomers Stanford and California. However, SMU couldn't carry the momentum through to the end of the season, as they went 3–4 over their final seven games of the regular season. They defeated Notre Dame, California, and Syracuse but lost to Wake Forest, eighteenth-ranked Clemson, Stanford and Florida State.

The Mustangs finished the season 24–11 and 13–7 in ACC play to finish in a three-way tie for fourth place. As the sixth seed in the 2025 ACC tournament earned a bye into Second Round where they defeated fourteenth seed Syracuse for the second time in eight days. They fell advanced to the Quarterfinals where they lost to third seed and tenth ranked Clemson, 57–54. They were an exempt qualifiers in the NIT. The Mustangs were the one-seed in their Dallas Region. They defeated Northern Iowa in the First Round before losing to fourth seed Oklahoma State 85–83 in the Second Round.

== Previous season ==
The Mustangs finished the 2023–24 season 20–13, 11–7 in AAC play to finish in a tie for fifth place. As the sixth seed in the AAC tournament, they lost to Temple in the second round. They received an at-large bid to the NIT where they lost to Indiana State in the First Round.

== Offseason ==
=== Departures ===
Departures
Name	Number	Pos.	Height	Weight	Year	Hometown	Reason for departure
Zhuric Phelps	1	G	6'5"	195	Junior	Midland, Texas	Transferred to Texas A&M
Jalen Smith	2	G	6'2"	195	Junior	Orlando, Florida	Transferred to Rice
Denver Anglin	4	G	6'1"	185	Junior	Montclair, New Jersey	Transferred to Rice
Ricardo Wright	5	G	6'4"	190	Senior	Eustis, Florida	Transferred to Kennesaw State
Samuell Williamson	10	F	6'8"	205	Graduate Student	Rockwall, Texas	Graduated
Tyreek Smith	12	F	6'8"	225	Senior	Baton Rouge, Louisiana	Transferred to Memphis
Mo Njie	13	C	6'11"	250	Junior	Centerville, Ohio	Transferred to UTSA
Ja'Heim Hudson	15	F	6'7"	220	Junior	Hinesville, Georgia	Transferred to Auburn
Xavier Foster	20	F	7'0"	225	Junior	Oskaloosa, Iowa	Transferred to Radford
Emory Lanier	24	G	6'4"	190	Senior	Atlanta, Georgia	Transferred to Rice

=== Incoming transfers ===
Incoming transfers
Name	Number	Pos.	Height	Weight	Year	Hometown	Previous school
Kevin "Boopie" Miller	2	G	6'0	175	(redshirt) Junior	Chicago, Illinois	Wake Forest
Tibet Görener	5	F	6'8"	198	(redshirt) Senior	Istanbul, Turkey	San Jose State
Kario Oquendo	8	G	6'4"	210	Graduate Student	Titusville, Florida	Oregon
Jerrell Colbert	20	C	6'10"	235	(redshirt) Junior	Houston, Texas	Kansas State
Yohan Traore	21	C	6'11"	235	Junior	Tours, France	UC Santa Barbara
Matt Cross	33	F	6'6"	225	Graduate Student	Beverly, Massachusetts	UMass

=== 2024 Recruiting class ===
College recruiting
Name	Hometown	School	Height	Weight	Commit date
Mitchell Holmes; F	Branson, Missouri	Link Academy	6 ft 11 in (2.11 m)	215 lb (98 kg)	Oct 13, 2023
Mitchell Holmes; F	Recruit ratings: Rivals: 247Sports: ESPN: (NR)				
Chance Puryear #22 PF	Dallas, TX	Carter High School	6 ft 7 in (2.01 m)	200 lb (91 kg)	Jun 8, 2023
Chance Puryear #22 PF	Recruit ratings: Rivals: 247Sports: ESPN: (79)				
Samet Yiğitoğlu; C			7 ft 1 in (2.16 m)	N/A	
Samet Yiğitoğlu; C	Recruit ratings: Rivals: 247Sports: ESPN: (NR)				
Overall recruit ranking: Rivals: NR 247Sports: 73
Note: In many cases, Scout, Rivals, 247Sports, On3, and ESPN may conflict in their listings of height and weight.; In these cases, the average was taken. ESPN grades are on a 100-point scale.; Sources: "SMU 2024 Basketball Commitments". Rivals.; "2024 Team Ranking". Rivals.; "2024 SMU Mustangs Basketball 24/7 Sports Commits". 247Sports.

== Roster ==
2024–25 SMU Mustangs men's basketball team
Players
Coaches

Pos.	#	Name	Height	Weight	Year	Previous school	Hometown
G	0	B.J. Edwards	6 ft 3 in (1.91 m)	188 lb (85 kg)	Jr	Knoxville Catholic	Knoxville, TN
F	1	Chance Puryear	6 ft 7 in (2.01 m)	200 lb (91 kg)	Fr	Carter	Dallas, TX
G	2	Boopie Miller	6 ft 0 in (1.83 m)	175 lb (79 kg)	RS Jr	Wake Forest	Chicago, IL
G	3	Chuck Harris	6 ft 2 in (1.88 m)	200 lb (91 kg)	Sr	Butler	Ashburn, VA
F	5	Tibet Görener	6 ft 9 in (2.06 m)	205 lb (93 kg)	RS Sr	San Jose State	Istanbul, Turkey
G	8	Kario Oquendo	6 ft 4 in (1.93 m)	210 lb (95 kg)	GS	Oregon	Titusville, Florida
G	10	AJ George	6 ft 6 in (1.98 m)	190 lb (86 kg)	Jr	Hoover; Long Beach State	Fresno, CA
F	13	Mitchell Holmes	6 ft 11 in (2.11 m)	215 lb (98 kg)	Fr	Link Academy	Branson, MO
C	20	Jerrell Colbert	6 ft 10 in (2.08 m)	235 lb (107 kg)	RS Jr	Kansas State	Houston, TX
F	21	Yohan Traore	6 ft 11 in (2.11 m)	235 lb (107 kg)	Jr	UC Santa Barbara	Tours, France
F	22	Keon Ambrose-Hylton	6 ft 8 in (2.03 m)	215 lb (98 kg)	Sr	Alabama	Toronto, ON
G	23	Niccolo Kalischer-Stork	6 ft 3 in (1.91 m)	190 lb (86 kg)	Fr	Harvard-Westlake	Los Angeles, CA
C	24	Samet Yiğitoğlu	7 ft 2 in (2.18 m)	265 lb (120 kg)	Fr	Turkey
G	31	Trey Utter (W)	6 ft 0 in (1.83 m)	160 lb (73 kg)	Jr	Argyle	Argyle, TX
F	33	Matt Cross	6 ft 7 in (2.01 m)	230 lb (104 kg)	Sr	UMass	Beverly, MA
G	35	Jackson Young (W)	6 ft 2 in (1.88 m)	185 lb (84 kg)	Sr	Hawaii Pacific	Kerrville, TX

Head coach

- Andy Enfield (John's Hopkins)

Assistant coach(es)

- Chris Kapko (South Florida)
- Jay Morris (Concordia)
- Dana Ford (Illinois State)
- Eric Mobley (Portland)
- Kurt Karis (USC)

Legend

- (C) Team captain
- (S) Suspended
- (I) Ineligible
- (W) Walk-on
- Injured
- Current redshirt

Roster
Last update: December 2, 2024

== Schedule and results ==
Date time, TV	Rank^{#}	Opponent^{#}	Result	Record	High points	High rebounds	High assists	Site (attendance) city, state
Exhibition
October 26, 2024*; 11:00 a.m.		at Oklahoma State	L 78–89		14 – Tied	7 – Tied	3 – Tied	Gallagher-Iba Arena; Stillwater, OK
Regular season
November 4, 2024*; 7:30 p.m., ACCNX/ESPN+		Tarleton State	W 96–62	1–0	21 – Miller	6 – Tied	7 – Miller	Moody Coliseum (5,454); Dallas, TX
November 7, 2024*; 7:00 p.m., ACCNX/ESPN+		Florida A&M	W 102–73	2–0	20 – Miller	10 – Traore	9 – Miller	Moody Coliseum (5,014); Dallas, TX
November 11, 2024*; 7:00 p.m., ACCNX/ESPN+		UNC Greensboro	W 81–68	3–0	21 – Miller	7 – Edwards	7 – Miller	Moody Coliseum (4,930); Dallas, TX
November 15, 2024*; 6:00 p.m., FS2		at Butler	L 70–81	3–1	21 – Harris	6 – Tied	4 – Miller	Hinkle Fieldhouse (7,798); Indianapolis, IN
November 18, 2024*; 7:00 p.m., ACCNX/ESPN+		Prairie View A&M; Acrisure Holiday Invitational campus game	W 110–69	4–1	17 – Tied	12 – Cross	5 – Harris	Moody Coliseum (5,056); Dallas, TX
November 22, 2024*; 7:30 p.m., ACCNX/ESPN+		Mississippi State	L 79–84	4–2	13 – Oquendo	9 – Cross	6 – Miller	Moody Coliseum (5,468); Dallas, TX
November 26, 2024*; 8:30 p.m., TruTV		vs. Cal Baptist; Acrisure Holiday Invitational semifinal	W 79–77	5–2	17 – Edwards	8 – Cross	5 – Miller	Spotlight 29 Casino (536); Palm Springs, CA
November 27, 2024*; 8:30 p.m., TruTV		vs. Washington State; Acrisure Holiday Invitational championships	W 77–60	6–2	16 – Miller	11 – Yiğitoğlu	5 – Miller	Spotlight 29 Casino; Palm Springs, CA
December 3, 2024*; 7:00 p.m., ACCNX/ESPN+		Alabama State	W 101–72	7–2	20 – Oquendo	10 – Cross	5 – Tied	Moody Coliseum (5,025); Dallas, TX
December 7, 2024; 1:15 p.m., The CW		Virginia	W 63–51	8–2 (1–0)	21 – Oquendo	10 – Cross	4 – Miller	Moody Coliseum (5,189); Dallas, TX
December 14, 2024*; 3:00 p.m., ESPNU		vs. LSU	W 74–64	9–2	16 – Cross	16 – Cross	7 – Miller	Comerica Center (3,479); Frisco, TX
December 21, 2024; 11:00 a.m., The CW		at Boston College	W 103–77	10–2 (2–0)	20 – Cross	8 – Cross	7 – Miller	Conte Forum (4,168); Chestnut Hill, MA
December 29, 2024*; 1:00 p.m., ACCNX/ESPN+		Longwood	W 98–82	11–2	24 – Miller	11 – Traore	7 – Miller	Moody Coliseum (5,220); Dallas, TX
January 4, 2025; 1:15 p.m., The CW		No. 4 Duke	L 62–89	11–3 (2–1)	21 – Miller	13 – Yiğitoğlu	5 – Miller	Moody Coliseum (7,105); Dallas, TX
January 7, 2025; 8:00 p.m., ACCN		at North Carolina	L 67–82	11–4 (2–2)	18 – Harris	11 – Cross	3 – Miller	Dean Smith Center (19,594); Chapel Hill, NC
January 11, 2025; 3:00 p.m., ESPN2		Georgia Tech	W 93–71	12–4 (3–2)	21 – Harris	9 – Yiğitoğlu	9 – Miller	Moody Coliseum (5,526); Dallas, TX
January 15, 2025; 8:00 p.m., ACCN		at Virginia	W 54–52	13–4 (4–2)	12 – Tied	6 – Tied	4 – Miller	John Paul Jones Arena (13,554); Charlottesville, VA
January 18, 2025; 1:00 p.m., ESPNU		at Miami (FL)	W 117–74	14–4 (5–2)	18 – Miller	6 – Cross	10 – Miller	Watsco Center (3,922); Coral Gables, FL
January 21, 2025; 8:00 p.m., ACCN		No. 25 Louisville	L 73–98	14–5 (5–3)	18 – Cross	8 – Cross	4 – Edwards	Moody Coliseum (6,135); Dallas, TX
January 25, 2025; 11:00 a.m., The CW		at NC State	W 63–57	15–5 (6–3)	20 – Yiğitoğlu	10 – Cross	5 – Miller	Lenovo Center (12,728); Raleigh, NC
January 29, 2025; 8:00 p.m., ACCN		California	W 76–65	16–5 (7–3)	20 – Harris	14 – Cross	5 – Tied	Moody Coliseum (5,602); Dallas, TX
February 1, 2025; 5:00 p.m., ACCN		Stanford	W 85–61	17–5 (8–3)	17 – Yiğitoğlu	8 – Cross	10 – Miller	Moody Coliseum (6,176); Dallas, TX
February 5, 2025; 8:00 p.m., ACCN		at Virginia Tech	W 81–75	18–5 (9–3)	21 – Cross	8 – Edwards	8 – Edwards	Cassell Coliseum (8,925); Blacksburg, VA
February 11, 2025; 8:00 p.m., ACCN		Pittsburgh	W 83–63	19–5 (10–3)	17 – Tied	10 – Yiğitoğlu	6 – Edwards	Moody Coliseum (5,525); Dallas, TX
February 15, 2025; 5:00 p.m., ACCN		Wake Forest	L 66–77	19–6 (10–4)	15 – Harris	9 – Cross	6 – Harris	Moody Coliseum (6,858); Dallas, TX
February 19, 2025; 6:00 p.m., ACCN		at Notre Dame	W 97–73	20–6 (11–4)	25 – Oquendo	9 – Cross	7 – Harris	Joyce Center (4,332); South Bend, IN
February 22, 2025; 3:00 p.m., ACCN		No. 18 Clemson	L 69–79	20–7 (11–5)	16 – Harris	9 – Edwards	5 – Harris	Moody Coliseum (7,054); Dallas, TX
February 26, 2025; 10:00 p.m., ESPNU		at California	W 81–77	21–7 (12–5)	21 – Harris	8 – Oquendo	5 – Edwards	Haas Pavilion (4,133); Berkeley, CA
March 1, 2025; 4:00 p.m., ACCN		at Stanford	L 68–73	21–8 (12–6)	17 – Harris	7 – Traore	3 – Harris	Maples Pavilion (3,890); Stanford, CA
March 4, 2025; 8:00 p.m., ESPNU		Syracuse	W 77–75	22–8 (13–6)	16 – Oquendo	8 – Cross	5 – Tied	Moody Coliseum (5,804); Dallas, TX
March 8, 2025; 3:00 p.m., ESPNU		at Florida State	L 69–76	22–9 (13–7)	16 – Miller	6 – Cross	5 – Miller	Donald L. Tucker Center (5,619); Tallahassee, FL
ACC tournament
March 12, 2025; 8:30 p.m., ESPNU	(6)	vs. (14) Syracuse; Second round	W 73–53	23–9	12 – Tied	9 – Cross	4 – Miller	Spectrum Center (6,620); Charlotte, NC
March 13, 2025; 8:30 p.m., ESPN2	(6)	vs. (3) No. 10 Clemson; Quarterfinals	L 54–57	23–10	13 – Cross	6 – Yiğitoğlu	4 – Miller	Spectrum Center (10,627); Charlotte, NC
NIT
March 19, 2025; 8:00 p.m., ESPN2	(1)	Northern Iowa; First round – Dallas Region	W 73–63	24–10	16 – Edwards	10 – Edwards	7 – Edwards	Moody Coliseum (2,418); Dallas, TX
March 23, 2025; 2:00 p.m., ESPN2	(1)	(4) Oklahoma State; Second round – Dallas Region	L 83–85	24–11	31 – Oquendo	9 – Yiğitoğlu	10 – Harris	Moody Coliseum (3,106); Dallas, TX
*Non-conference game. ^{#}Rankings from AP poll. (#) Tournament seedings in parentheses. All times are in Central Time.
