= Jeremiah Wilkinson =

American basketball player (born 2006)

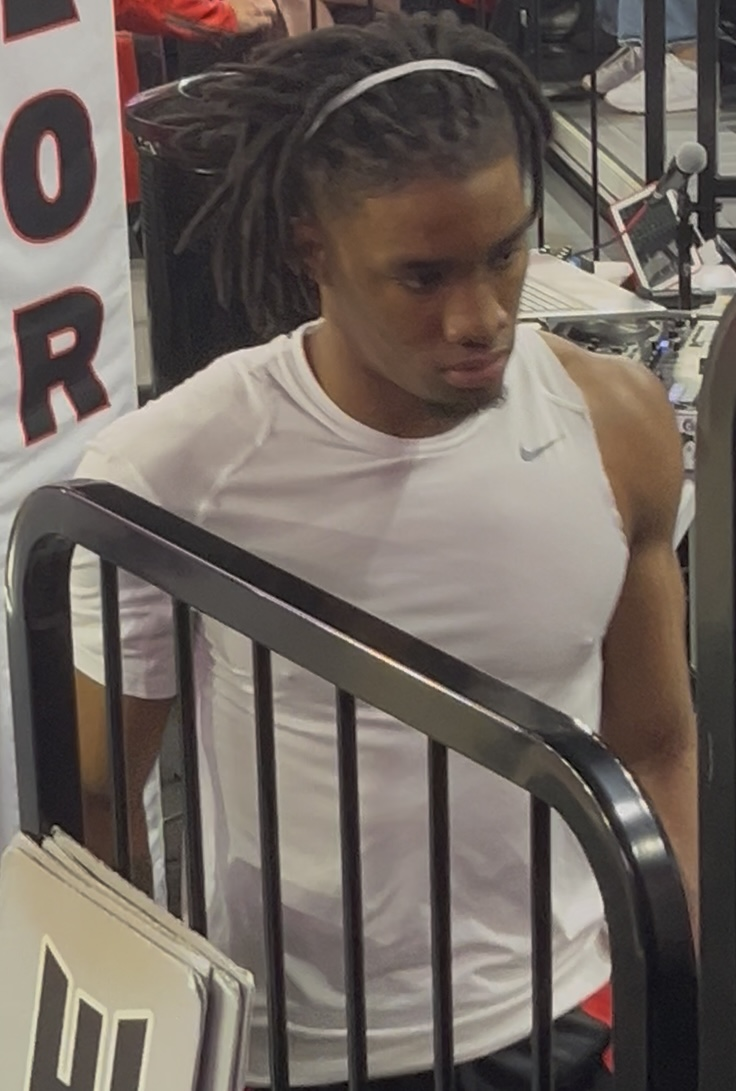
- Wilkinson in 2025

Arkansas Razorbacks
- Position: Point guard
- Conference: Southeastern Conference

Personal information
- Born: March 28, 2006 (age 20)
- Listed height: 6 ft 1 in (1.85 m)
- Listed weight: 185 lb (84 kg)

Career information
- High school: The Skill Factory (Atlanta, Georgia)
- College: California (2024–2025); Georgia (2025–2026); Arkansas (2026–present)

Career highlights
- ACC Sixth Man of The Year (2025); ACC All-Freshman Team (2025)

Jeremiah Wilkinson (born March 28, 2006) is an American college basketball player for the Arkansas Razorbacks of the Southeastern Conference (SEC). He previously played for the California Golden Bears and Georgia Bulldogs.

== Early life ==
Wilkinson initially attended Campbell High School in Smyrna, Georgia, before transferring to Hillgrove High School in Powder Springs, Georgia for his sophomore year. The following year he once again transferred, this time to The Skill Factory in Atlanta, averaging 14.3 points, 3.1 assists, and 3.1 rebounds per game as a junior. As a senior, he averaged 33.5 points per game, before committing to play college basketball at the University of California, Berkeley.

== College career ==
As a true freshman with California, he made an instant impact. Wilkinson finished his freshman season averaging 15.1 points, 1.9 rebounds, and 1.5 assists per game, being named to the named to the ACC All-Freshman team and ACC Sixth Man of the Year. At the conclusion of the season, he entered the transfer portal.

On April 3, 2025, Wilkinson announced his decision to transfer to the University of Georgia to play for the Georgia Bulldogs. In his debut appearance for the Bulldogs against Bellarmine, he recorded 15 points in a 104–59 victory. Against rival Auburn, Wilkinson scored 31 points, including four three-point field goals, leading the Bulldogs to an overtime win. Against Saint Louis in the NCAA Tournament, he scored 30 points and made seven three-point field goals. Wilkinson concluded the season as Georgia’s leading scorer, averaging 17.4 points per game, along with 2.0 rebounds and 1.7 assists per game. He entered the transfer portal for a second time following the conclusion of the season.

On April 14, 2026, Wilkinson announced his decision to transfer to the University of Arkansas to play for the Arkansas Razorbacks.

== Career statistics ==
Legend
GP	Games played	GS	Games started	MPG	Minutes per game
FG%	Field goal percentage	3P%	3-point field goal percentage	FT%	Free throw percentage
RPG	Rebounds per game	APG	Assists per game	SPG	Steals per game
BPG	Blocks per game	PPG	Points per game	**Bold**	Career high

=== College ===
Year	Team	GP	GS	MPG	FG%	3P%	FT%	RPG	APG	SPG	BPG	PPG
2024–25	California	32	14	27.3	.399	.321	.786	1.9	1.5	.8	.1	15.1
2025–26	Georgia	31	21	25.7	.410	.357	.786	2.0	1.7	1.6	.3	17.4
