= Rady Children's Invitational =

College basketball tournament

- Sport: College basketball
- Founded: 2023
- No. of teams: 4
- Venues: LionTree Arena (2023–2024); Jenny Craig Pavilion (2025–present)
- Most recent champion: TCU
- Sponsors: Rady Children's Hospital; Sports San Diego
- Tournament format: Single elimination
- Website: Rady Children's Invitational

The Rady Children's Invitational is an annual men's NCAA Division I college basketball tournament held in San Diego, California. The tournament was founded in 2023. It was held at LionTree Arena originally, but moved to the Jenny Craig Pavilion on the campus of the University of San Diego in 2025. Four teams compete in a two-day, four-game bracketed tournament.

== History and format ==
The inaugural tournament took place November 23–24, 2023, at LionTree Arena on the campus of UC San Diego, featuring Iowa (Big Ten), Oklahoma (Big 12), USC (Pac-12), and Seton Hall (Big East). Oklahoma defeated USC to win the championship.

After a second year at LionTree Arena in 2024, the tournament moved to the Jenny Craig Pavilion at the University of San Diego, where it has taken place since 2025.

== Brackets ==
* – Denotes overtime period

=== 2026 ===
The 2026 tournament will take place November 26–27 at Jenny Craig Pavilion.

Semifinals; November 26; FS1
Georgetown
Texas
Saint Mary's
UCLA

Championship; November 27; FOX
3rd place Game; November 27; FOX

=== 2025 ===
The 2025 tournament took place November 27–28 at Jenny Craig Pavilion.

Semifinals; November 27; FS1
10	Florida	80
TCU	84
Wisconsin	104
Providence	83

Championship; November 28; FOX
TCU	74
Wisconsin	63
3rd place Game; November 28; FOX
10	Florida	90
Providence	78

=== 2024 ===
The 2024 tournament took place November 28–29 at LionTree Arena.

Semifinals; November 28; FS1
13	Purdue	71
NC State	61
23	Ole Miss	96*
BYU	85

Championship; November 29; FOX
13	Purdue	80
23	Ole Miss	78
3rd place Game; November 29; FOX
NC State	61
BYU	72

=== 2023 ===
The inaugural tournament took place November 23–24 at LionTree Arena.

Semifinals; November 23; FS1
Oklahoma	79
Iowa	67
Seton Hall	63
23	USC	71

Championship; November 24; FOX
Oklahoma	72
23	USC	70
3rd place Game; November 24; FOX
Iowa	85
Seton Hall	72
