= 2024 McDonald's All-American Boys Game =

American high school basketball game

West	East
86	88
	1st half	2nd half	Total
West	44	42	86
East	37	51	88
- Date: April 2, 2024
- Venue: Toyota Center, Houston, Texas
- MVP: Dylan Harper & Derik Queen
- Network: ESPN

McDonald's All-American

The 2024 McDonald's All-American Boys Game was an all-star basketball game played on April 2, 2024, at Toyota Center in Houston, Texas. The game's rosters featured the best and most highly recruited high school boys graduating in the class of 2024. The game was the 47th annual version of the McDonald's All-American Game first played in 1977. The 24 players were selected from over 700 nominees by a committee of basketball experts. They were chosen not only for their on-court skills, but for their performances off the court as well.

== Rosters ==
The roster was announced on January 23, 2024. Alabama, Duke, Arkansas, North Carolina and Rutgers each had the most selections with two. At the announcement of the roster selections 16 schools were represented, while Karter Knox, Bryson Tucker and Derik Queen were uncommitted. Trent Perry was committed to USC at the time of the selection of the team but decommitted before the game was played when the school parted ways with their coach. East forward Liam McNeeley also decommitted from Indiana before the game started, but was committed to Indiana when the roster was announced. He later committed to UConn. After the game was played Boogie Fland and Karter Knox announced their decommittment from Kentucky and announced they would follow head coach John Calipari to Arkansas. Jayden Quaintance decommitted from Kentucky as well and announced on April 29 that he would instead sign with Arizona State.

=== Team East ===
ESPN 100 Rank	Name	Height (ft–in)	Weight (lb)	Position	Hometown	High school	College choice
6	Jalil Bethea	6–4	175	G	Philadelphia, PA	Archbishop Wood High School	Miami (FL)
38	John Bol	7–1	210	C	Saint Louis, MO	Overtime Elite Academy	Ole Miss
7	Isaiah Evans	6–7	195	F	Huntersville, NC	North Mecklenburg High School	Duke
1	Cooper Flagg	6–9	200	F	Newport, ME	Monteverde Academy	Duke
15	Boogie Fland	6–2	175	G	White Plains, NY	Archbishop Stepinac High School	Arkansas‡
16	Ian Jackson	6–4	180	F	Bronx, NY	Our Savior Lutheran School	North Carolina
11	Liam McNeeley†	6–7	190	F	Plano, TX	Monteverde Academy	UConn
27	Tahaad Pettiford	5–10	175	G	Jersey City, N.J.	Hudson Catholic Regional High School	Auburn
13	Drake Powell	6–5	185	G	Pittsboro, NC	Northwood High School	North Carolina
14	Jayden Quaintance	6–9	225	F	Raleigh, NC	Word of God Christian Academy	Arizona State‡
10	Derik Queen^	6–10	240	C	Baltimore, MD	Monteverde Academy	Maryland
17	Bryson Tucker^	6–7	180	F	Bowie, MD	Bishop O'Connell High School	Indiana

Note: *

=== Team West ===
ESPN 100 Rank	Name	Height (ft–in)	Weight (lb)	Position	Hometown	High school	College choice
2	Ace Bailey	6–8	210	F	Chattanooga, TN	McEachern High School	Rutgers
9	Flory Bidunga	6–10	210	C	Kinshasa, DRC	Kokomo High School	Kansas
20	Carter Bryant	6–8	220	F	Riverside, CA	Centennial High School	Arizona
29	Zoom Diallo	6–3	180	G	Tacoma, WA	Prolific Prep of Napa Christian	Washington
4	V. J. Edgecombe	6–4	185	G	Bimini, The Bahamas	Long Island Lutheran High School	Baylor
19	Donnie Freeman	6–7	190	F	Washington, D.C.	IMG Academy	Syracuse
3	Dylan Harper	6–5	180	G	Franklin Lakes, NJ	Don Bosco Preparatory High School	Rutgers
5	Tre Johnson	6–6	185	G	Dallas, TX	Link Academy	Texas
24	Karter Knox^	6–6	180	G	Tampa, FL	Overtime Elite Academy	Arkansas‡
26	Trent Perry†	6–4	180	G	North Hollywood, CA	Harvard-Westlake School	UCLA†
8	Derrion Reid	6–7	200	F	Grovetown, GA	Prolific Prep of Napa Christian	Alabama
21	Aiden Sherrell	6–11	220	C	Detroit, MI	Prolific Prep of Napa Christian	Alabama

^undecided at the time of roster selection
~undecided at game time
†decommitted from original school before game was played
‡decommitted from school after game was played

== Box Score ==
ESPN Ammanuel Seyoum, 45

April 2, 2024
09:30 pm ET

East	88–86	West
Scoring by half: 37−44, 51−42
Pts: Derik Queen, 42; Rebs: Derik Queen, 8 Asts: Derik Queen, 5		Pts: Dylan Harper, 22; Rebs: 2 Tied, 6 Asts: Dylan Harper, 5

Toyota Center, Houston, Texas
