= Donnie Freeman =

Donnie Freeman can refer to:

- Donnie Freeman (basketball, born 1944), American basketball player
- Donnie Freeman (basketball, born 2005), Bahamian basketball player

== See also ==
- Don Freeman (1908–1978), American painter
