= 2024–25 Indiana Hoosiers men's basketball team =

American college basketball season

2024–25 Indiana Hoosiers men's basketball
- Conference: Big Ten Conference
- Record: 19–13 (10–10 Big Ten)
- Head coach: Mike Woodson (4th season)
- Associate head coach: Kenya Hunter (5th season); Yasir Rosemond (4th season)
- Assistant coach: Brian Walsh (3rd season)
- Captains: Trey Galloway; Anthony Leal
- Home arena: Simon Skjodt Assembly Hall

2024–25 Big Ten Conference men's basketball standings
	Conf.				Overall
Team	W		L	PCT	W		L	PCT
No. 7 Michigan State	17	–	3	.850	30	–	7	.811
No. 9 Maryland	14	–	6	.700	27	–	9	.750
No. 10 Michigan †	14	–	6	.700	27	–	10	.730
UCLA	13	–	7	.650	23	–	11	.676
No. 16 Wisconsin	13	–	7	.650	27	–	10	.730
No. 14 Purdue	13	–	7	.650	24	–	12	.667
Illinois	12	–	8	.600	22	–	13	.629
Oregon	12	–	8	.600	25	–	10	.714
Indiana	10	–	10	.500	19	–	13	.594
Ohio State	9	–	11	.450	17	–	15	.531
Rutgers	8	–	12	.400	15	–	17	.469
Minnesota	7	–	13	.350	15	–	17	.469
Northwestern	7	–	13	.350	17	–	16	.515
USC	7	–	13	.350	17	–	18	.486
Iowa	7	–	13	.350	17	–	16	.515
Nebraska	7	–	13	.350	21	–	14	.600
Penn State	6	–	14	.300	16	–	15	.516
Washington	4	–	16	.200	13	–	18	.419
† 2025 Big Ten tournament winner Rankings from AP poll

The 2024–25 Indiana Hoosiers men's basketball team represented Indiana University in the 2024–25 NCAA Division I men's basketball season. They were led by fourth-year head coach, and former Indiana standout, Mike Woodson. The team played its home games at Simon Skjodt Assembly Hall in Bloomington, Indiana, as a member of the Big Ten Conference. The season officially began with the annual event, Hoosier Hysteria, on Friday, October 18, 2024.

By missing out on the 2025 NCAA Tournament, the Woodson era came to a close. Turning down other post-season tournament invites, the Hoosiers finished with an overall record of 19–13, and 10–10 in Big Ten Conference play.

The Indiana Hoosiers drew an average home attendance of 16,447, the 8th-highest of all college basketball teams.

== Previous season ==
Woodson's third season did not meet expectations, as the 2023–24 Hoosiers finished 19–14 overall and 10–10 in the Big Ten. IU received the No. 6 seed in the Big Ten Conference tournament, where they beat Penn State for the first time that season, 61–59 with a last second tip-in by Anthony Leal. In the quarterfinals, IU lost to Nebraska for the third time that season, 93–66.

== Offseason ==
=== Departures ===
Indiana departures
Name	Number	Pos.	Height	Weight	Year	Hometown	Reason for departure
Xavier Johnson	0	G	6'3"	200	SR	Woodbridge, VA	Graduated
Kel'el Ware	1	C	7'0"	230	SO	North Little Rock, AR	Declared for 2024 NBA draft
Anthony Walker	4	F	6'9"	215	SR	Baltimore, MD	Graduated
Kaleb Banks	10	F	6'7"	215	SO	Hampton, GA	Transferred to Tulane
CJ Gunn	11	G	6'6"	194	SO	Indianapolis, IN	Transferred to DePaul
Payton Sparks	24	G	6'10"	255	JR	Winchester, IN	Transferred to Ball State

=== Incoming transfers ===
Indiana's coaching staff hit the portal early during the off-season and was able to get their first commitment from the Pac-12 Freshman of the Year, Myles Rice. The announcement came right after his visit to the IU campus on April 13, 2024. Rice averaged 14.8 points, 3.8 assists, 3.1 rebounds and 1.6 steals per game during his freshman season at Washington State. In addition to being PAC-12 Freshman of the Year, Rice was named first-team All-Pac 12 and won Pac-12 Freshman of the Week seven times. Just a few days later on April 16, 2024, IU secured their second transfer in Oumar Ballo. Coming from Arizona, he was considered the number one transfer in the portal. Over his career at Arizona and Gonzaga, Ballo has a field goal percentage of 64.6% and 56.4% percent as a free throw shooter. Kanaan Carlyle, ranked tenth in the transfer portal, committed to Indiana on April 20, 2024. In his freshman year at Stanford, Carlyle averaged 11.5 points, 2.7 rebounds, and 2.7 assists. Coming out of high school, he was a consensus four-star and a top-60 recruit; however, by the time he signed with Stanford he was a five-star recruit, ranked No. 15 overall by ESPN. With these three transfers, on April 20, 2024, IU had the number one transfer portal class in the country. The Hoosiers added a fourth portal transfer on April 26, 2024: Luke Goode, an Indiana native from Fort Wayne, Indiana. Goode played for three years for the Fighting Illini and posted a career 3-point average of 38.8%. He only has one year of eligibility remaining. Another Indiana native, Langdon Hatton, announced his commitment to play for IU on May 15, 2024. Hatton came from Bellarmine, where as a junior he shot 50.9% on 2s and 33.3% on 3s.

Indiana incoming transfers
Name	Number	Pos	Height	Weight	Year	Hometown	Previous school	Years remaining	Date eligible
Myles Rice	1	G	6'3"	180	RS sophomore	Columbia, SC	Washington State	3	October 1, 2024
Oumar Ballo	11	C	7'0"	260	Graduate	Koulikoro, Mali	Arizona	1	October 1, 2024
Kanaan Carlyle	9	G	6'3"	185	Sophomore	Atlanta, GA	Stanford	3	October 1, 2024
Luke Goode	10	F	6'7"	205	Senior	Fort Wayne, IN	Illinois	1	October 1, 2024
Langdon Hatton	12	F	6'10"	240	Senior	Georgetown, IN	Bellarmine	1	October 1, 2024

=== Recruiting classes ===
==== 2024 recruiting class ====
College recruiting
Name	Hometown	School	Height	Weight	Commit date
Bryson Tucker; SF	Arlington, VA	Bishop O'Connell High School	6 ft 6 in (1.98 m)	180 lb (82 kg)	Mar 28, 2024
Bryson Tucker; SF	Recruit ratings: Rivals: 247Sports: ESPN: (91)				
Overall recruit ranking:
Note: In many cases, Scout, Rivals, 247Sports, On3, and ESPN may conflict in their listings of height and weight.; In these cases, the average was taken. ESPN grades are on a 100-point scale.; Sources: "2024 Team Ranking". Rivals.

==== 2025 recruiting class ====
College recruiting (2025)
Name	Hometown	School	Height	Weight	Commit date
Trent Sisley; PF	Lincoln City, IN	Montverde Academy	6 ft 7 in (2.01 m)	205 lb (93 kg)	Sep 23, 2024
Trent Sisley; PF	Recruit ratings: Rivals: 247Sports: ESPN: (82)				
Harun Zrno; F	Sarajevo, Bosnia and Herzegovina	KK Slavija	6 ft 7 in (2.01 m)	205 lb (93 kg)	Jan 24, 2025
Harun Zrno; F	Recruit ratings: No ratings found				
Overall recruit ranking:
Note: In many cases, Scout, Rivals, 247Sports, On3, and ESPN may conflict in their listings of height and weight.; In these cases, the average was taken. ESPN grades are on a 100-point scale.; Sources: "2025 Team Ranking". Rivals.

== Roster ==
Note: Players' year is based on remaining eligibility. The NCAA did not count the 2020–21 season towards eligibility.

2024–25 Indiana Hoosiers men's basketball team
Players
Coaches

Pos.	#	Name	Height	Weight	Year	Previous school	Hometown
G	0	Jakai Newton	6 ft 3 in (1.91 m)	210 lb (95 kg)	RS Fr	Newton	Covington, GA
G	1	Myles Rice	6 ft 3 in (1.91 m)	185 lb (84 kg)	RS So	Sandy Creek/Washington State	Columbia, SC
G	2	Gabe Cupps (redshirt)	6 ft 2 in (1.88 m)	180 lb (82 kg)	So	Centerville	Dayton, OH
G/F	3	Anthony Leal (C)	6 ft 5 in (1.96 m)	200 lb (91 kg)	Sr	Bloomington South	Bloomington, IN
F	5	Malik Reneau	6 ft 9 in (2.06 m)	232 lb (105 kg)	Jr	Montverde Academy	Miami, FL
F	8	Bryson Tucker	6 ft 7 in (2.01 m)	207 lb (94 kg)	Fr	Bishop O'Connell	Arlington, VA
G	9	Kanaan Carlyle	6 ft 3 in (1.91 m)	182 lb (83 kg)	So	Overtime Elite/Stanford	Atlanta, GA
F	10	Luke Goode	6 ft 7 in (2.01 m)	203 lb (92 kg)	Sr	Homestead/Illinois	Fort Wayne, IN
C	11	Oumar Ballo	7 ft 0 in (2.13 m)	265 lb (120 kg)	GS	Canterbury School/Arizona	Koulikoro, Mali
F	12	Langdon Hatton	6 ft 10 in (2.08 m)	247 lb (112 kg)	Sr	North Harrison/Bellarmine	Georgetown, IN
G	13	Shaan Burke (W)	6 ft 4 in (1.93 m)	190 lb (86 kg)	Sr	Vista	San Diego, CA
G	14	Jordan Rayford (W)	6 ft 5 in (1.96 m)	210 lb (95 kg)	RS So	Phillips Academy/Air Force	Washington, D.C.
F	15	James Goodis (W)	6 ft 0 in (1.83 m)	185 lb (84 kg)	So	Montverde Academy	Winter Park, FL
G	20	Jaden Bobbett (W)	6 ft 2 in (1.88 m)	190 lb (86 kg)	Sr	Cushing Academy/Middlebury College	Rye, NH
F	21	Mackenzie Mgbako	6 ft 9 in (2.06 m)	222 lb (101 kg)	So	Roselle Catholic	Gladstone, NJ
G	22	Jackson Creel (W)	6 ft 3 in (1.91 m)	190 lb (86 kg)	Sr	Mt. Vernon Township/Rend Lake College	Mount Vernon, IL
F	30	Ian Stephens (W)	6 ft 6 in (1.98 m)	178 lb (81 kg)	So	New Palestine	New Palestine, IN
G	32	Trey Galloway (C)	6 ft 5 in (1.96 m)	205 lb (93 kg)	Sr	Culver Academies	Culver, IN
F	42	Dallas James (W)	7 ft 0 in (2.13 m)	245 lb (111 kg)	Sr	Inglewood/South Carolina State	Artesia, CA

Head coach

- Mike Woodson (Indiana)

Assistant coach(es)

- Kenya Hunter (Duquesne)
- Yasir Rosemond (Oregon)
- Brian Walsh (Akron)

Legend

- (C) Team captain
- (S) Suspended
- (I) Ineligible
- (W) Walk-on
- Injured
- Current redshirt

Roster
Last update: April 26, 2024

== Schedule and results ==
Date time, TV	Rank^{#}	Opponent^{#}	Result	Record	High points	High rebounds	High assists	Site (attendance) city, state
Exhibition
October 27, 2024*; 3:00 p.m., SECN+/ESPN+	No. 17	at No. 12 Tennessee; John McLendon Foundation Charity Exhibition	W 66–62	–	21 – Reneau	11 – Ballo	4 – Tied	Thompson–Boling Arena (13,351); Knoxville, TN
November 1, 2024*; 7:00 p.m., B1G+	No. 17	Marian	W 106–64	–	19 – Tucker	8 – Reneau	5 – Tied	Simon Skjodt Assembly Hall (17,222); Bloomington, IN
Regular season
November 6, 2024*; 8:00 p.m., BTN	No. 17	SIU Edwardsville	W 80–61	1–0	31 – Mgbako	9 – Mgbako	9 – Galloway	Simon Skjodt Assembly Hall (17,222); Bloomington, IN
November 10, 2024*; 12:00 p.m., B1G+	No. 17	Eastern Illinois	W 90–55	2–0	18 – Mgbako	9 – Ballo	8 – Galloway	Simon Skjodt Assembly Hall (17,222); Bloomington, IN
November 16, 2024*; 3:00 p.m., Peacock	No. 16	South Carolina	W 87–71	3–0	23 – Rice	13 – Ballo	3 – Rice	Simon Skjodt Assembly Hall (17,222); Bloomington, IN
November 21, 2024*; 6:30 p.m., FS1	No. 16	UNC Greensboro	W 69–58	4–0	20 – Rice	11 – Ballo	6 – Rice	Simon Skjodt Assembly Hall (17,222); Bloomington, IN
November 27, 2024*; 12:00 p.m., ESPN	No. 14	vs. Louisville; Battle 4 Atlantis Quarterfinals	L 61–89	4–1	21 – Reneau	7 – Reneau	4 – Reneau	Imperial Arena (1,594); Paradise Island, The Bahamas
November 28, 2024*; 2:30 p.m., ESPN2	No. 14	vs. No. 3 Gonzaga; Battle 4 Atlantis consolation 2nd round	L 73–89	4–2	25 – Ballo	5 – Tied	6 – Galloway	Imperial Arena (2,885); Paradise Island, The Bahamas
November 29, 2024*; 11:00 a.m., ESPN2	No. 14	vs. Providence; Battle 4 Atlantis 7th place game	W 89–73	5–2	25 – Mgbako	10 – Ballo	6 – Rice	Imperial Arena (1,117); Paradise Island, The Bahamas
December 3, 2024*; 7:30 p.m., BTN		Sam Houston State	W 97–71	6–2	19 – Rice	10 – Reneau	5 – Reneau	Simon Skjodt Assembly Hall (17,222); Bloomington, IN
December 6, 2024*; 7:00 p.m., BTN		Miami (OH)	W 76–57	7–2	19 – Reneau	18 – Ballo	6 – Ballo	Simon Skjodt Assembly Hall (17,222); Bloomington, IN
December 9, 2024; 6:30 p.m., BTN		Minnesota	W 82–67	8–2 (1–0)	18 – Ballo	7 – Tied	5 – Carlyle	Simon Skjodt Assembly Hall (17,222); Bloomington, IN
December 13, 2024; 8:00 p.m., FOX		at Nebraska	L 68–85	8–3 (1–1)	20 – Rice	11 – Ballo	3 – Galloway	Pinnacle Bank Arena (14,635); Lincoln, NE
December 21, 2024*; 12:00 p.m., BTN		Chattanooga	W 74–65	9–3	14 – Tied	8 – Tied	4 – Tied	Simon Skjodt Assembly Hall (13,574); Bloomington, IN
December 29, 2024*; 4:00 p.m., BTN		Winthrop	W 77–68	10–3	18 – Rice	11 – Hatton	5 – Galloway	Simon Skjodt Assembly Hall (14,499); Bloomington, IN
January 2, 2025; 8:30 p.m., Peacock		Rutgers	W 84–74	11–3 (2–1)	21 – Rice	12 – Ballo	4 – Tied	Simon Skjodt Assembly Hall (13,843); Bloomington, IN
January 5, 2025; 12:00 p.m., BTN		vs. Penn State	W 77–71	12–3 (3–1)	25 – Ballo	13 – Ballo	6 – Galloway	The Palestra (6,126); Philadelphia, PA
January 8, 2025; 7:00 p.m., BTN		USC	W 82–69	13–3 (4–1)	23 – Ballo	9 – Rice	6 – Tied	Simon Skjodt Assembly Hall (13,022); Bloomington, IN
January 11, 2025; 8:00 p.m., FOX		at Iowa	L 60–85	13–4 (4–2)	12 – Rice	13 – Ballo	5 – Rice	Carver–Hawkeye Arena (10,948); Iowa City, IA
January 14, 2025; 7:00 p.m., Peacock		No. 19 Illinois; Rivalry	L 69–94	13–5 (4–3)	16 – Ballo	15 – Ballo	5 – Galloway	Simon Skjodt Assembly Hall (17,222); Bloomington, IN
January 17, 2025; 8:00 p.m., FOX		at Ohio State	W 77–76 ^{OT}	14–5 (5–3)	23 – Goode	15 – Ballo	6 – Galloway	Value City Arena (13,124); Columbus, OH
January 22, 2025; 7:00 p.m., BTN		at Northwestern	L 70–79	14–6 (5–4)	20 – Mgbako	7 – Ballo	7 – Ballo	Welsh–Ryan Arena (7,039); Evanston, IL
January 26, 2025; 12:00 p.m., CBS		Maryland	L 78–79	14–7 (5–5)	16 – Tied	10 – Ballo	5 – Galloway	Simon Skjodt Assembly Hall (17,222); Bloomington, IN
January 31, 2025; 8:00 p.m., FOX		at No. 10 Purdue; Rivalry/Indiana National Guard Governor's Cup	L 76–81	14–8 (5–6)	25 – Mgbako	8 – Ballo	5 – Galloway	Mackey Arena (14,876); West Lafayette, IN
February 4, 2025; 9:00 p.m., Peacock		at No. 21 Wisconsin	L 64–76	14–9 (5–7)	15 – Mgbako	6 – Tied	5 – Galloway	Kohl Center (14,447); Madison, WI
February 8, 2025; 1:00 p.m., CBS		No. 24 Michigan	L 67–70	14–10 (5–8)	16 – Reneau	11 – Mgbako	5 – Reneau	Simon Skjodt Assembly Hall (17,222); Bloomington, IN
February 11, 2025; 9:00 p.m., Peacock		at No. 11 Michigan State	W 71–67	15–10 (6–8)	19 – Reneau	12 – Reneau	3 – Leal	Breslin Student Events Center (14,797); East Lansing, MI
February 14, 2025; 8:00 p.m., FOX		UCLA	L 68–72	15–11 (6–9)	16 – Goode	7 – Goode	6 – Galloway	Simon Skjodt Assembly Hall (17,222); Bloomington, IN
February 23, 2025; 1:30 p.m., CBS		No. 13 Purdue; Rivalry/Indiana National Guard Governor's Cup	W 73–58	16–11 (7–9)	15 – Tied	6 – Reneau	9 – Galloway	Simon Skjodt Assembly Hall (17,222); Bloomington, IN
February 26, 2025; 8:30 p.m., BTN		Penn State	W 83–78	17–11 (8–9)	20 – Ballo	12 – Ballo	9 – Galloway	Simon Skjodt Assembly Hall (17,222); Bloomington, IN
March 1, 2025; 6:00 p.m., Peacock		at Washington	W 78–62	18–11 (9–9)	22 – Reneau	6 – Reneau	7 – Galloway	Hec Edmundson Pavilion (7,851); Seattle, WA
March 4, 2025; 9:00 p.m., FS1		at Oregon	L 64–73	18–12 (9–10)	16 – Galloway	12 – Ballo	4 – Tied	Matthew Knight Arena (9,584); Eugene, OR
March 8, 2025; 3:45 p.m., CBS		Ohio State; Senior Day	W 66–60	19–12 (10–10)	16 – Tied	8 – Tied	6 – Galloway	Simon Skjodt Assembly Hall (17,222); Bloomington, IN
Big Ten Tournament
March 13, 2025; 12:00 p.m., BTN	(9)	vs. (8) No. 23 Oregon; Second round	L 59–72	19–13	19 – Reneau	8 – Tied	9 – Galloway	Gainbridge Fieldhouse; Indianapolis, IN
*Non-conference game. ^{#}Rankings from AP Poll. (#) Tournament seedings in parentheses. All times are in Eastern Time.

== Player statistics ==
Individual player statistics (final)
			Minutes		Scoring		Total FGs			3-point FGs			Free-throws			Rebounds							
Player	GP	GS	Tot	Avg	Pts	Avg	FG	FGA	Pct	3FG	3FGA	Pct	FT	FTA	Pct	Off	Def	Tot	Avg	A	Stl	Blk	TO
Ballo, Oumar	30	29	894	28.8	403	13.0	157	252	.623	0	0	.000	89	156	.571	94	188	282	9.1	66	21	40	63
Carlyle, Kanaan	25	6	404	16.2	101	4.0	39	135	.289	17	70	.243	6	14	.429	8	33	41	1.6	30	13	5	17
Cupps, Gabe	4	0	24	6.0	0	0.0	0	4	.000	0	3	.000	0	0	.000	0	1	1	0.3	3	2	0	0
Galloway, Trey	32	20	892	27.9	280	8.8	108	256	.422	37	113	.327	27	42	.643	24	50	74	2.3	149	20	6	79
Goode, Luke	32	16	854	26.7	291	9.1	89	215	.414	62	158	.392	51	58	.879	24	74	98	3.1	20	26	7	13
Hatton, Langdon	19	0	122	6.4	39	2.1	11	20	.550	0	0	.000	17	23	.739	13	16	29	1.5	6	4	5	10
Leal, Anthony	26	14	546	21.0	85	3.3	26	45	.578	7	17	.412	26	42	.619	18	57	75	2.9	48	28	11	17
Mgbako, Mackenzie	32	31	809	25.3	389	12.2	139	318	.437	47	143	.329	64	79	.810	39	107	146	4.6	34	10	15	38
Newton, Jakai	4	0	18	4.5	6	1.5	3	6	.500	0	1	.000	0	1	.000	0	3	3	0.8	0	1	0	1
Rayford, Jordan	1	0	1	1.0	0	0.0	0	0	.000	0	0	.000	0	0	.000	0	0	0	0.0	0	0	0	0
Reneau, Malik	26	19	602	23.2	347	13.3	139	252	.552	3	24	.125	66	90	.733	43	100	143	5.5	52	21	14	41
Rice, Myles	32	25	880	27.5	323	10.1	112	272	.412	27	83	.325	72	88	.818	14	74	88	2.8	88	32	5	69
Tucker, Bryson	23	0	379	16.5	125	5.4	48	127	.378	3	20	.150	26	36	.722	15	51	66	2.9	13	8	1	14
Total	32		6425	200.8	2389	74.66	871	1902	.458	203	632	.321	444	629	.706	349	817	1166	36.4	509	186	107	371
Opponents	32		6425	200.8	2305	72.03	827	1904	.434	242	741	.327	409	564	.725	320	759	1079	33.7	428	216	103	363

Legend
GP	Games played	GS	Games started	Avg	Average per game
FG	Field-goals made	FGA	Field-goal attempts	Off	Offensive rebounds
Def	Defensive rebounds	A	Assists	TO	Turnovers
Blk	Blocks	Stl	Steals	High	Team high

== Rankings ==
Ranking movements Legend: ██ Increase in ranking ██ Decrease in ranking — = Not ranked RV = Received votes
	Week																				
Poll	Pre	1	2	3	4	5	6	7	8	9	10	11	12	13	14	15	16	17	18	19	Final
AP	17	16	16	14	RV	RV	RV	RV	RV	RV	—	—	—	—	—	—	—	—	—	—	—
Coaches	18	16	18	15	RV	RV	—	—	—	RV	RV	—	—	—	—	—	—	—	—	—	—

== Awards and honors ==
=== Pre-season awards ===
Name	Award	Date
Oumar Ballo	Blue Ribbon Pre-Season Big Ten Newcomer of the Year	September 5, 2024
Oumar Ballo	Blue Ribbon Pre-Season All-Big Ten	September 5, 2024
Oumar Ballo	Blue Ribbon Pre-Season All-American	September 5, 2024
Oumar Ballo	Lindy's Pre-Season Third Team All-American	September 13, 2024
Oumar Ballo	Pre-Season All-Big Ten	October 1, 2024

=== Post-season awards ===
Name	Award	Date
Oumar Ballo	Big Ten Honorable Mention (Coaches and Media)	March 11, 2025
Oumar Ballo	NABC Great Lakes District Second Team	March 18, 2025
Malik Reneau	Big Ten Honorable Mention (Media)	March 11, 2025
Anthony Leal	Indiana's Big Ten Sportsmanship Award	March 11, 2025
