= 2024–25 North Carolina Tar Heels men's basketball team =

American college basketball season

2024–25 North Carolina Tar Heels men's basketball

NCAA tournament, First Round
- Conference: Atlantic Coast Conference
- Record: 23–14 (13–7 ACC)
- Head coach: Hubert Davis (4th season)
- Assistant coaches: Jeff Lebo (4th season); Sean May (4th season); Brad Frederick (8th season); Pat Sullivan (4th season); Marcus Paige (2nd season)
- Home arena: Dean E. Smith Center

2024–25 ACC men's basketball standings
	Conf.				Overall
Team	W		L	PCT	W		L	PCT
No. 3 Duke †	19	–	1	.950	35	–	4	.897
No. 21 Louisville	18	–	2	.900	27	–	8	.771
No. 22 Clemson	18	–	2	.900	27	–	7	.794
Wake Forest	13	–	7	.650	21	–	11	.656
North Carolina	13	–	7	.650	23	–	14	.622
SMU	13	–	7	.650	24	–	11	.686
Stanford	11	–	9	.550	21	–	14	.600
Georgia Tech	10	–	10	.500	17	–	17	.500
Virginia	8	–	12	.400	15	–	17	.469
Virginia Tech	8	–	12	.400	13	–	19	.406
Florida State	8	–	12	.400	17	–	15	.531
Notre Dame	8	–	12	.400	15	–	18	.455
Pittsburgh	8	–	12	.400	17	–	15	.531
Syracuse	7	–	13	.350	14	–	19	.424
California	6	–	14	.300	14	–	19	.424
NC State	5	–	15	.250	12	–	19	.387
Boston College	4	–	16	.200	12	–	19	.387
Miami (FL)	3	–	17	.150	7	–	24	.226
† 2025 ACC tournament winner Rankings from AP poll

The 2024–25 North Carolina Tar Heels men's basketball team represented the University of North Carolina at Chapel Hill for the 2024–25 NCAA Division I men's basketball season. The team was led by coach Hubert Davis in his fourth season as UNC's head coach, and is assisted by Jeff Lebo, Sean May, and Brad Frederick. The Tar Heels played their home games at the Dean Smith Center in Chapel Hill, North Carolina, as members of the Atlantic Coast Conference (ACC).

The Tar Heels began the season ranked ninth in the AP poll and defeated Elon 90–76, before traveling to Kansas to face first-ranked Kansas. The Tar Heels fell 92–89 and fell one spot to tenth in the polls. Two wins before the Thanksgiving tournament was not enough to see the Tar Heels hold on to their tenth spot in the rankings as the fell to twelfth. They traveled to Lahaina to participate in the Maui Invitational. They defeated Dayton in the quarterfinals before losing to fourth-ranked Auburn in the semifinals and Michigan State, in overtime to finish in fourth place. The Tar Heels fell to twentieth in the polls before facing tenth-ranked Alabama in the ACC–SEC Challenge. They lost 94–79 at home before defeating Georgia Tech in their ACC opener. The win wasn't enough to see the Tar Heels stay ranked, as they dropped out of the polls for the first time in the season.

The Tar Heels went 1–1 against the next ranked teams they faced, losing to seventh-ranked Florida in Charlotte in the Jumpman Invitational. They defeated eighteenth-ranked UCLA at Madison Square Garden in the CBS Sports Classic. The Tar Heels opened 2025 with a loss to Louisville before winning their next four games, which included a 63–61 victory over rival NC State. The Tar Heels went 1–4 in their next five games, with the only win coming in overtime against Boston College. They lost to rivals Wake Forest and their rival and second-ranked Duke over this stretch. However, their form improved after this stretch as the won seven of their next eight games. The only loss was against twenty third-ranked Clemson. Notable wins included a one point win over Pittsburgh, a six-point win over Syracuse and a second victory over NC State. The team concluded the regular season with a 82–69 loss to second-ranked rival Duke.

The Tar Heels finished the regular season 20–12 and 13–7 in ACC play to finish in a three-way tie for fourth place. As the fifth seed in the 2025 ACC tournament earned a bye into Second Round where they defeated twelfth seed Notre Dame. In the Quarterfinals they avenged a regular season loss to rivals Wake Forest, 68–59. In the Semifinals they faced rivals Duke for a third time this season. Duke was the first seed, and first ranked team in the nation. The Tar Heels lost for a third time this season to Duke 74–71. They received an at-large bid to the NCAA Tournament. The Tar Heels were an eleven-seed and placed in the First Four in the South region. There they defeated San Diego State 95–68 to advance to the full tournament. They were defeated in the First Round by six-seed Ole Miss. They finished with an overall record of 23–14.

The North Carolina Tar Heels drew an average home attendance of 20,521, the highest of all basketball teams in the world.

== Previous season ==
The Tar Heels finished the season 29–8 and 17–3 in ACC play to finish as regular season champions. As the first seed in the ACC tournament, they earned a bye to the Quarterfinals, where they defeated ninth seed Florida State. They defeated Pittsburgh in the Semifinals but could not overcome NC State for a third time in the season in the Final. They lost 84–76 to finish as runner-up. They earned an at-large bid to the NCAA tournament and were placed as a first seed in the West region. They defeated sixteenth seed Wagner in the First Round, and ninth seed Michigan State in the Second Round before falling to fourth seed Alabama in the Sweet Sixteen to end their season.

== Offseason ==
=== Departures ===
North Carolina Departures
Name	Number	Pos.	Height	Weight	Year	Hometown	Reason for Departure
Cormac Ryan	3	G	6'5"	195	Graduate Student	New York, New York	Graduated
Armando Bacot	5	F/C	6'11"	240	Graduate Student	Richmond, Virginia	Graduated
Paxson Wojcik	8	G	6'5"	195	Graduate Student	Charleston, South Carolina	Graduated
Creighton Lebo	14	G	6'1"	180	Senior	Greenville, North Carolina	Graduated
Rob Landry	22	G	6'4"	190	Senior	Greensboro, North Carolina	Graduated
James Okonkwo	32	F	6'8"	240	Junior	Maidenhead, England	Transferred to Akron
Duwe Farris	34	F	6'7"	210	Graduate Student	Charlotte, North Carolina	Graduated
Harrison Ingram	55	F	6'7"	225	Junior	Dallas, Texas	Drafted 48th overall in the 2024 NBA draft

=== Additions ===
==== Incoming transfers ====
Incoming transfers
Name	Number	Pos.	Height	Weight	Year	Hometown	Previous School
Cade Tyson	5	G/F	6'7"	205	Junior	Monroe, North Carolina	Belmont
Ven-Allen Lubin	22	F	6'8"	225	Junior	Orlando, Florida	Vanderbilt
Tyzhaun Claude	0	F	6’7"	226	Graduate	Goldsboro, North Carolina	Georgia Tech

==== Recruiting class ====
College recruiting information
Name	Hometown	School	Height	Weight	Commit date
James Brown; F	Chicago, Illinois	Link Academy	6 ft 8 in (2.03 m)	215 lb (98 kg)	Jan 2, 2023
James Brown; F	Recruit ratings: Rivals: 247Sports: ESPN: (85)				
Ian Jackson; F	Bronx, New York	Our Saviour Lutheran School	6 ft 4 in (1.93 m)	180 lb (82 kg)	Jan 16, 2023
Ian Jackson; F	Recruit ratings: Rivals: 247Sports: ESPN: (93)				
Drake Powell; G	Pittsboro, North Carolina	Northwood	6 ft 5 in (1.96 m)	185 lb (84 kg)	Sep 8, 2022
Drake Powell; G	Recruit ratings: Rivals: 247Sports: ESPN: (92)				
Overall recruit ranking: Rivals: 7 247Sports: 5
Note: In many cases, Scout, Rivals, 247Sports, On3, and ESPN may conflict in their listings of height and weight.; In these cases, the average was taken. ESPN grades are on a 100-point scale.; Sources: "North Carolina 2024 Basketball Commitments". Rivals.; "2024 North Carolina Tar Heels Recruiting Class". ESPN.; "2024 Team Ranking". Rivals.

== Roster ==
2024–25 North Carolina Tar Heels men's basketball team
Players
Coaches

Pos.	#	Name	Height	Weight	Year	Previous school	Hometown
F	0	Ty Claude	6 ft 7 in (2.01 m)	230 lb (104 kg)	GS	Moravian Prep	Goldsboro, NC
F	2	James Brown	6 ft 10 in (2.08 m)	215 lb (98 kg)	Fr	Link Academy	Chicago, IL
G	3	Elliot Cadeau	6 ft 1 in (1.85 m)	180 lb (82 kg)	So	Link Academy (MO)	West Orange, NJ
G	4	R. J. Davis	6 ft 0 in (1.83 m)	180 lb (82 kg)	GS	Archbishop Stepinac	White Plains, NY
G/F	5	Cade Tyson	6 ft 7 in (2.01 m)	200 lb (91 kg)	Jr	Belmont	Monroe, NC
G	6	Elijah Davis (W) (redshirt)	6 ft 3 in (1.91 m)	215 lb (98 kg)	Sr	Lynchburg	Chapel Hill, NC
G	7	Seth Trimble	6 ft 3 in (1.91 m)	195 lb (88 kg)	Jr	Menomonee Falls	Menomonee Falls, WI
G/F	9	Drake Powell	6 ft 6 in (1.98 m)	195 lb (88 kg)	Fr	Northwood	Pittsboro, NC
G	11	Ian Jackson	6 ft 4 in (1.93 m)	190 lb (86 kg)	Fr	Our Saviour Lutheran School	Bronx, NY
F	13	Jalen Washington	6 ft 10 in (2.08 m)	235 lb (107 kg)	Jr	West Side	Gary, IN
G	14	Russell Hawkins (W)	6 ft 1 in (1.85 m)	175 lb (79 kg)	So	Mallard Creek	Charlotte, NC
F	15	John Holbrook (W)	6 ft 8 in (2.03 m)	230 lb (104 kg)	Fr	Hickory	Hickory, NC
F	22	Ven-Allen Lubin	6 ft 8 in (2.03 m)	230 lb (104 kg)	Jr	Vanderbilt	Orlando, FL
F	24	Jae'Lyn Withers	6 ft 9 in (2.06 m)	220 lb (100 kg)	GS	Louisville	Charlotte, NC
G	30	Dante Mayo Jr. (W)	6 ft 1 in (1.85 m)	175 lb (79 kg)	Fr	Richard Montgomery	Gaithersburg, MD

Head coach

- Hubert Davis (North Carolina)

Assistant coach(es)

- Jeff Lebo (North Carolina)
- Sean May (North Carolina)
- Brad Frederick (North Carolina)
- Marcus Paige (North Carolina)

Legend

- (C) Team captain
- (S) Suspended
- (I) Ineligible
- (W) Walk-on
- Injured
- Current redshirt

Roster
Last update: August 7, 2024

== Schedule and results ==
Date time, TV	Rank^{#}	Opponent^{#}	Result	Record	High points	High rebounds	High assists	Site (attendance) city, state
Exhibition
October 15, 2024*; 7:00 p.m., ESPNU	No. 9	at Memphis; Hoops for St. Jude Tip Off Classic	W 84–76		33 – Trimble	9 – Tyson	13 – Cadeau	FedExForum; Memphis, TN
October 27, 2024*; 2:00 p.m., ACCNX/ESPN+	No. 9	Johnson C. Smith	W 127–63		21 – Jackson	12 – Lubin	8 – Cadeau	Dean Smith Center (16,123); Chapel Hill, NC
Regular Season
November 4, 2024*; 9:00 p.m., ACCN	No. 9	Elon	W 90–76	1–0	24 – Davis	10 – Withers	8 – Cadeau	Dean Smith Center (17,242); Chapel Hill, NC
November 8, 2024*; 7:00 p.m., ESPN2	No. 9	at No. 1 Kansas	L 89–92	1–1	19 – Trimble	9 – Tied	7 – Cadeau	Allen Fieldhouse (15,300); Lawrence, KS
November 15, 2024*; 8:00 p.m., ACCN	No. 10	American	W 107–55	2–1	18 – Tied	11 – Powell	8 – Cadeau	Dean Smith Center (19,555); Chapel Hill, NC
November 22, 2024*; 12:30 a.m., ESPN2	No. 10	at Hawaii	W 87–69	3–1	18 – Davis	5 – Washington	4 – Tied	Stan Sheriff Center (8,948); Honolulu, HI
November 25, 2024*; 11:30 p.m., ESPN2	No. 12	vs. Dayton; Maui Invitational quarterfinals	W 92–90	4–1	30 – Davis	10 – Trimble	5 – Tied	Lahaina Civic Center (2,400); Lahaina, HI
November 26, 2024*; 11:00 p.m., ESPN	No. 12	vs. No. 4 Auburn; Maui Invitational semifinals	L 72–85	4–2	17 – Trimble	9 – Lubin	3 – Cadeau	Lahaina Civic Center (2,400); Lahaina, HI
November 27, 2024*; 9:30 p.m., ESPN2	No. 12	vs. Michigan State; Maui Invitational 3rd place game	L 91–94 ^{OT}	4–3	18 – Powell	7 – Washington	7 – Davis	Lahaina Civic Center (2,400); Lahaina, HI
December 4, 2024*; 7:15 p.m., ESPN	No. 20	No. 10 Alabama; ACC–SEC Challenge	L 79–94	4–4	23 – Jackson	6 – Cadeau	4 – Tied	Dean Smith Center (21,750); Chapel Hill, NC
December 7, 2024; 2:00 p.m., ACCN	No. 20	Georgia Tech	W 68–65	5–4 (1–0)	19 – Trimble	8 – Lubin	4 – Cadeau	Dean Smith Center (19,020); Chapel Hill, NC
December 14, 2024*; 4:00 p.m., The CW		La Salle	W 93–67	6–4	23 – Tyson	8 – Trimble	7 – Cadeau	Dean Smith Center (18,420); Chapel Hill, NC
December 17, 2024*; 7:00 p.m., ESPN		vs. No. 7 Florida; Jumpman Invitational	L 84–90	6–5	29 – Davis	8 – Davis	7 – Cadeau	Spectrum Center (16,058); Charlotte, NC
December 21, 2024*; 3:00 p.m., CBS		vs. No. 18 UCLA; CBS Sports Classic	W 76–74	7–5	24 – Jackson	5 – Powell	5 – Cadeau	Madison Square Garden (19,812); New York, NY
December 29, 2024*; 8:00 p.m., ACCN		Campbell	W 97–81	8–5	26 – Jackson	7 – Withers	12 – Cadeau	Dean Smith Center (19,959); Chapel Hill, NC
January 1, 2025; 6:00 p.m., ACCN		at Louisville	L 70–83	8–6 (1–1)	23 – Jackson	9 – Lubin	5 – Cadeau	KFC Yum! Center (14,248); Louisville, KY
January 4, 2025; 12:00 p.m., CBS		at Notre Dame	W 74–73	9–6 (2–1)	27 – Jackson	6 – Tied	7 – Davis	Purcell Pavilion (9,149); South Bend, IN
January 7, 2025; 9:00 p.m., ACCN		SMU	W 82–67	10–6 (3–1)	26 – Davis	7 – Jackson	4 – Davis	Dean Smith Center (19,594); Chapel Hill, NC
January 11, 2025; 4:00 p.m., ACCN		at NC State; Rivalry	W 63–61	11–6 (4–1)	21 – Jackson	12 – Washington	11 – Cadeau	Lenovo Center (19,500); Raleigh, NC
January 15, 2025; 7:00 p.m., ACCN		California	W 79–53	12–6 (5–1)	20 – Jackson	8 – Lubin	3 – Tied	Dean Smith Center (20,031); Chapel Hill, NC
January 18, 2025; 2:15 p.m., The CW		Stanford	L 71–72	12–7 (5–2)	19 – Davis	6 – Cadeau	5 – Tied	Dean Smith Center (21,750); Chapel Hill, NC
January 21, 2025; 9:00 p.m., ESPN		at Wake Forest; Rivalry	L 66–67	12–8 (6–3)	21 – Davis	7 – Lubin	13 – Cadeau	LJVM Coliseum (12,799); Winston-Salem, NC
January 25, 2025; 2:15 p.m., The CW		Boston College	W 102–96 ^{OT}	13–8 (6–3)	22 – Davis	12 – Trimble	5 – Davis	Dean Smith Center (21,750); Chapel Hill, NC
January 28, 2025; 9:00 p.m., ESPN		at Pittsburgh	L 65–73	13–9 (6–4)	16 – Davis	12 – Trimble	7 – Cadeau	Petersen Events Center (11,277); Pittsburgh, PA
February 1, 2025; 6:30 p.m., ESPN		at No. 2 Duke; Rivalry/College GameDay	L 70–87	13–10 (6–5)	12 – Tied	6 – Lubin	3 – Cadeau	Cameron Indoor Stadium (9,314); Durham, NC
February 8, 2025; 4:00 p.m., ESPNU		Pittsburgh	W 67–66	14–10 (7–5)	18 – Davis	7 – Trimble	7 – Cadeau	Dean Smith Center (21,750); Chapel Hill, NC
February 10, 2025; 7:00 p.m., ESPN		at No. 23 Clemson	L 65–85	14–11 (7–6)	18 – Davis	6 – Lubin	6 – Cadeau	Littlejohn Coliseum (8,704); Clemson, SC
February 15, 2025; 6:00 p.m., ESPN		at Syracuse	W 88–82	15–11 (8–6)	23 – Jackson	8 – Trimble	6 – Davis	JMA Wireless Dome (22,340); Syracuse, NY
February 19, 2025; 7:00 p.m., ESPN		NC State; Rivalry	W 97–73	16–11 (9–6)	21 – Davis	7 – Trimble	6 – Cadeau	Dean Smith Center (21,750); Chapel Hill, NC
February 22, 2025; 4:00 p.m., ESPN		Virginia	W 81–66	17–11 (10–6)	16 – Tied	11 – Withers	6 – Cadeau	Dean Smith Center (21,750); Chapel Hill, NC
February 24, 2025; 7:00 p.m., ESPN		at Florida State	W 96–85	18–11 (11–6)	20 – Davis	7 – Lubin	7 – Cadeau	Donald L. Tucker Center (7,922); Tallahassee, FL
March 1, 2025; 12:00 p.m., ESPN		Miami	W 92–73	19–11 (12–6)	19 – Lubin	10 – Withers	4 – Tied	Dean Smith Center (21,750); Chapel Hill, NC
March 4, 2025; 7:00 p.m., ESPNU		at Virginia Tech	W 91–59	20–11 (13–6)	19 – Jackson	11 – Lubin	12 – Cadeau	Cassell Coliseum (8,925); Blacksburg, VA
March 8, 2025; 6:30 p.m., ESPN		No. 2 Duke; Rivalry/College GameDay	L 69–82	20–12 (13–7)	20 – Davis	6 – Lubin	3 – Davis	Dean Smith Center (21,750); Chapel Hill, NC
ACC Tournament
March 12, 2025; 2:30 p.m., ESPN	(5)	vs. (12) Notre Dame; Second round	W 76–56	21–12	21 – Withers	10 – Lubin	10 – Cadeau	Spectrum Center (9,722); Charlotte, NC
March 13, 2025; 2:30 p.m., ESPN	(5)	vs. (4) Wake Forest; Quarterfinals/Rivalry	W 68–59	22–12	23 – Davis	13 – Lubin	3 – Withers	Spectrum Center (14,116); Charlotte, NC
March 14, 2025; 7:00 p.m., ESPN	(5)	vs. (1) No. 1 Duke; Semifinals/Rivalry	L 71–74	22–13	20 – Lubin	10 – Lubin	5 – Cadeau	Spectrum Center (18,116); Charlotte, NC
NCAA Tournament
March 18, 2025; 9:10 p.m., TruTV	(11 S)	vs. (11 S) San Diego State; First Four	W 95–68	23–13	26 – Davis	10 – Withers	12 – Cadeau	UD Arena (12,561); Dayton, OH
March 21, 2025; 4:05 pm, TNT	(11 S)	vs. (6 S) Ole Miss; First Round	L 64–71	23–14	15 – Davis	8 – Washington	8 – Cadeau	Fiserv Forum (16,899); Milwaukee, WI
*Non-conference game. ^{#}Rankings from AP Poll. (#) Tournament seedings in parentheses. S=South. All times are in Eastern Time.

== Rankings ==
Ranking movements Legend: ██ Increase in ranking ██ Decrease in ranking — = Not ranked RV = Received votes
	Week																				
Poll	Pre	1	2	3	4	5	6	7	8	9	10	11	12	13	14	15	16	17	18	19	Final
AP	9	10	10	12	20	RV	RV	RV	RV	—	—	—	—	—	—	—	—	—	—	—	—
Coaches	10	11	12	13	22	RV	RV	RV	RV	—	—	—	—	—	—	—	—	—	—	RV	—
