= Tobais Palmer =

American football player (born 1990)

No. 13
- Position: Wide receiver

Personal information
- Born: February 20, 1990 (age 36); Pittsboro, North Carolina, U.S.
- Listed height: 5 ft 10 in (1.78 m)
- Listed weight: 199 lb (90 kg)

Career information
- High school: Northwood (Pittsboro)
- College: NC State
- NFL draft: 2013: undrafted

Career history
- Jacksonville Jaguars (2013); San Diego Chargers (2013–2014)*; New Orleans Saints (2014)*; Buffalo Bills (2014–2015)*; Pittsburgh Steelers (2016)*; Carolina Panthers (2016)*; Montreal Alouettes (2017)*; Toronto Argonauts (2018)*; Birmingham Iron (2019)
- * Offseason or practice squad member only

Career NFL statistics
- Games played: 1
- Stats at Pro Football Reference

Tobais Palmer (born February 20, 1990) is an American former professional football player who was a wide receiver in the National Football League (NFL). He played college football for the NC State Wolfpack. He was a member of the Jacksonville Jaguars, San Diego Chargers, New Orleans Saints, Buffalo Bills, Pittsburgh Steelers, Carolina Panthers, Montreal Allouettes, Toronto Argonauts, and Birmingham Iron.

== Early life ==
Palmer was born in Pittsboro, North Carolina. He was a two-time offensive player of the year in his conference. He earned the Chatham County male athlete of the year award while attending Northwood High School.

== College career ==
In his final seasons at North Carolina State University, he finished with a total of 91 receptions, 1,277 receiving yards and 11 receiving touchdowns. He is also the new leading All-Purpose leader in the ACC. 3rd in NCAA (All-Purpose yards in a game) He also played at the Georgia Military College.

== Professional career ==
=== Jacksonville Jaguars ===
On April 27, 2013, he signed with the Jacksonville Jaguars as an undrafted free agent. He was released on August 30 and signed to the team's practice squad on September 1. On September 28, he was promoted to the active roster. He was released on September 30 and signed to the practice squad the next day. He was released from the practice squad on October 8.

=== San Diego Chargers ===
On November 19, 2013, Palmer signed with the San Diego Chargers to their practice squad. On May 21, 2014, he was waived-injured by the Chargers.

=== New Orleans Saints ===
On August 6, 2014, Palmer signed with the New Orleans Saints.

On August 25, 2014, Palmer was released from the New Orleans Saints.

=== Buffalo Bills ===
Palmer signed a 2-year contract / $960,000 with the Buffalo Bills, including an annual average salary of $480,000. On September 4, 2015, he was released by the Bills.

=== Pittsburgh Steelers ===
On February 4, 2016, Palmer signed a futures contract with the Pittsburgh Steelers. On May 11, 2016, Palmer was released by the Steelers.

=== Carolina Panthers ===
On May 20, 2016, Palmer signed with the Carolina Panthers. On August 9, 2016, the Panthers waived/injured Palmer. He reverted to injured reserve on August 10, 2016. He was waived with an injury settlement on August 16, 2016.

=== Montreal Alouettes ===
On January 19, 2017, Palmer signed with the Montreal Alouettes of the Canadian Football League (CFL). He was released by the Alouettes on May 28, 2017.

=== Toronto Argonauts ===
On February 21, 2018, Palmer signed with the Toronto Argonauts of the Canadian Football League as a free agent. He was released by the Argonauts on May 26, 2018.

=== Birmingham Iron ===
Palmer signed with the Birmingham Iron of the Alliance of American Football for the 2019 season. He was placed on injured reserve on April 1, 2019. The league ceased operations in April 2019.
