= Trent Perry =

American basketball player (born 2005)

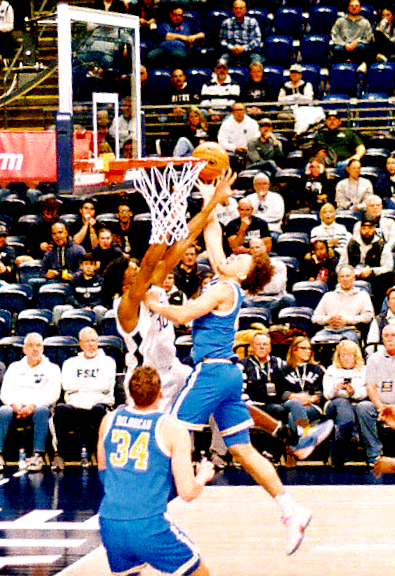
- Perry shooting with UCLA in 2026

No. 0 – UCLA Bruins
- Position: Point guard
- League: Big Ten Conference

Personal information
- Born: January 8, 2005 (age 21) West Covina, California, U.S.
- Listed height: 6 ft 4 in (1.93 m)
- Listed weight: 195 lb (88 kg)

Career information
- High school: Harvard-Westlake School (Los Angeles, California)
- College: UCLA (2024–present)

Career highlights
- McDonald's All-American (2024); California Mr. Basketball (2024)

Trent Perry (born January 8, 2005) is an American college basketball player for the UCLA Bruins of the Big Ten Conference. He was named a McDonald's All-American and voted California Mr. Basketball as a senior in high school in 2024.

== Early life ==
Perry was born and raised in West Covina, California, and attended Harvard-Westlake School. He was named the Mission League MVP at the end of his junior season. As a senior, Perry averaged 18.6 points, 6.1 rebounds, and 5.9 assists per game and was named the California Gatorade Player of the Year and repeated as Mission League MVP. Perry was selected to play in the 2024 McDonald's All-American Game and was named California Mr. Basketball.

== College career ==
Perry was rated a four-star recruit and initially committed to play college basketball for USC over offers from Stanford, Gonzaga, Oregon, Colorado, and TCU. He decommitted from USC on April 2, 2024, after head coach Andy Enfield left the program for SMU. Perry later signed to play at the University of California, Los Angeles.

Perry entered his freshman season with the Bruins as a reserve at guard. As a sophomore in 2025–26, he scored 22 of his career-high 30 points in the second half of a 71–60 win over Penn State. In the quarterfinals of the Big Ten tournament, he had 22 points, including six free throws in the final 36 seconds, to help sixth-seed UCLA defeat third-seed Michigan State 88–84.

== Career statistics ==
Legend
GP	Games played	GS	Games started	MPG	Minutes per game
FG%	Field goal percentage	3P%	3-point field goal percentage	FT%	Free throw percentage
RPG	Rebounds per game	APG	Assists per game	SPG	Steals per game
BPG	Blocks per game	PPG	Points per game	**Bold**	Career high

College statistics
Year	Team	GP	GS	MPG	FG%	3P%	FT%	RPG	APG	SPG	BPG	PPG
2024–25	UCLA	32	0	11.3	.369	.343	**.863**	1.7	.7	.6	**.1**	3.7
2025–26	UCLA	**35**	**24**	**29.9**	**.436**	**.392**	.858	**3.0**	**2.8**	**.9**	**.1**	**12.6**
Career		67	24	21.1	.421	.381	.859	2.4	1.8	.8	.1	8.3
