= Jayden Quaintance =

American basketball player (born 2007)

No. 22 – San Antonio Spurs
- Position: Power forward
- League: NBA

Personal information
- Born: July 11, 2007 (age 19) Cleveland, Ohio, U.S.
- Listed height: 6 ft 9 in (2.06 m)
- Listed weight: 255 lb (116 kg)

Career information
- High school: Hillcrest Prep (Phoenix, Arizona); Dream City Christian (Glendale, Arizona); Word of God (Raleigh, North Carolina)
- College: Arizona State (2024–2025); Kentucky (2025–2026)
- NBA draft: 2026: 1st round, 20th overall pick
- Drafted by: San Antonio Spurs
- Playing career: 2026–present

Career history
- 2026–present: San Antonio Spurs

Career highlights
- Big 12 All-Defensive Team (2025); Big 12 All-Freshman Team (2025); McDonald's All-American (2024)
- Stats at NBA.com
- Stats at Basketball Reference
Medals
Men's basketball
FIBA Americas Under-16 Championship
Gold medal – first place	2023 Mexico	Team

Jayden Warren Quaintance (born July 11, 2007) is an American basketball player for the San Antonio Spurs of the National Basketball Association (NBA). He played college basketball for the Arizona State Sun Devils and Kentucky Wildcats.

== Early life and high school ==
Quaintance grew up in Cleveland, Ohio. He moved to Phoenix, Arizona before the start of high school and enrolled at Hillcrest Prep. Quaintance transferred again to Word of God Christian Academy in Raleigh, North Carolina before his sophomore year. He also reclassified from the class of 2025 to 2024. Quaintance was selected to play in the 2024 McDonald's All-American Boys Game during his senior year.

=== Recruiting ===
Quaintance was a consensus five-star recruit and one of the top players in the 2024 class, according to major recruiting services. He committed to play college basketball at Kentucky over offers from Missouri, Florida, South Florida, and Ohio State. Quaintance signed a National Letter of Intent (NLI) to play for the Wildcats on November 15, 2023, during the early signing period. However, he requested a release from his NLI on April 10, 2024, shortly after Kentucky head coach John Calipari left the program to become the head coach at Arkansas. On April 29, 2024, Quaintance announced his commitment to Arizona State.

== College career ==
Quaintance played one season with Arizona State, averaging 9.4 points and 7.9 rebounds per game over 24 games. In February 2025, he injured his knee and missed the remainder of the season. He had knee surgery on March 19. Following the season, he entered the transfer portal. He later announced he would transfer to Kentucky, where he had originally committed to play his freshman year. Following the healing of his injury, Quaintance made his Wildcats debut on December 20, 2025, where he posted 10 points, eight rebounds, and two blocks in 17 minutes of playtime against the St. John's Red Storm. Following his debut, Quaintance would go on to play four games in a row until he was sidelined on January 7, 2026, following further issues and swelling in his leg. On February 17, 2026, Quaintance suffered a torn meniscus and was sidelined indefinitely, and was not permitted to participate in any activities. On April 14, 2026, Quaintance declared for the 2026 NBA Draft. Following his season at Kentucky, Quaintance only appeared in four total games.

== Professional career ==
On June 23, 2026, Quaintance was selected with the 20th overall pick by the San Antonio Spurs in the 2026 NBA draft. On July 6, 2026, the San Antonio Spurs announced that they had signed Quaintance. On July 15, the Spurs announced that Quaintance had undergone successful surgery on his right meniscus.

== National team career ==
Quaintance played for the United States national under-16 team at the 2023 FIBA Under-16 Americas Championship. He averaged 6.7 points and 6.5 rebounds in six games as the United States won the gold medal.

== Personal life ==
Quaintance's father, Haminn Quaintance, played college basketball at Jacksonville and Kent State. In his free time, Quaintance enjoys playing chess and watching anime. His favorite anime is One Piece.
