= Karter Knox =

American basketball player (born 2005)

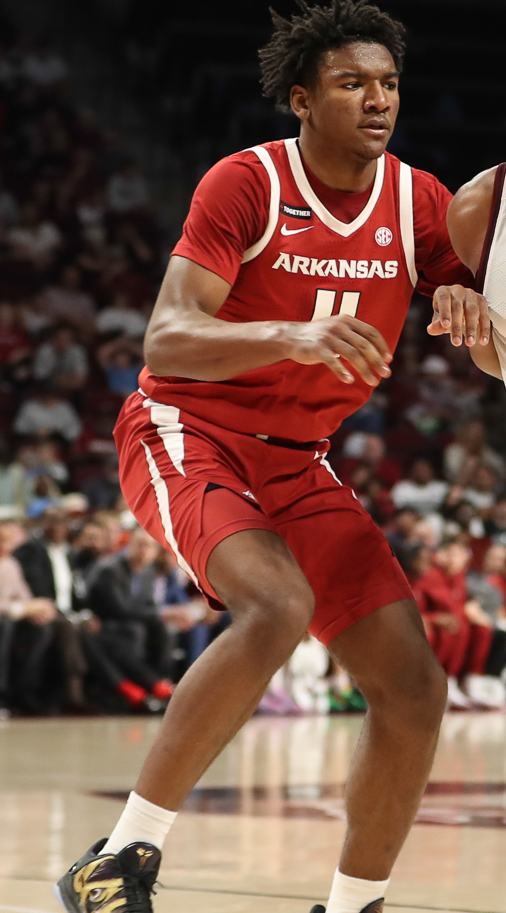
- Knox with Arkansas in 2025

No. 1 – Louisville Cardinals
- Position: Small forward
- Conference: Atlantic Coast Conference

Personal information
- Born: May 16, 2005 (age 21) Riverview, Florida, U.S.
- Listed height: 6 ft 6 in (1.98 m)
- Listed weight: 220 lb (100 kg)

Career information
- High school: Tampa Catholic (Tampa, Florida); Overtime Elite Academy (Atlanta, Georgia)
- College: Arkansas (2024–2026); Louisville (2026–present)

Career highlights
- McDonald's All-American (2024)
Medals
Men's basketball
Representing United States
FIBA U17 World Cup
| Gold medal – first place | 2022 Spain | Team |

Karter Knox (born May 16, 2005) is an American college basketball player for the Louisville Cardinals of the Atlantic Coast Conference (ACC). He previously played for the Arkansas Razorbacks.

== Early life and high school career ==
Knox grew up in Tampa, Florida and initially attended Tampa Catholic High School. He averaged 19.8 points, 9.9 rebounds, 2.6 assists, 1.7 steals, and 1.2 blocks per game as a junior. Knox opted to leave Tampa Catholic to join the Overtime Elite league as a non-professional player for the RWE team in order to preserve his collegiate eligibility. The move was due to Florida's restrictions on NIL compensation. Knox was selected to play in the 2024 McDonald's All-American Boys Game.

=== Recruiting ===
Knox was considered a top-30 prospect in the 2024 class. He committed to play college basketball at Kentucky over offers from Louisville and South Florida. Knox later decommitted after it was reported that Kentucky head coach John Calipari would be leaving the program to become the head coach at Arkansas. He ultimately opted to follow Calipari and committed to play at Arkansas.

== College career ==
Knox averaged 8.3 points and 3.3 rebounds per game as a freshman on 46.2% shooting from the field. As a sophomore, Knox averaged 8.1 points, 4.5 rebounds and 1.2 assists per game. Following the season he transferred to Louisville.

== Personal life ==
Knox's father, Kevin Knox, played in the NFL as a wide receiver. His older brother, Kevin Knox II, was selected ninth overall by the New York Knicks in the 2018 NBA draft.
