= 2024–25 UCLA Bruins men's basketball team =

American college basketball season

2024–25 UCLA Bruins men's basketball

NCAA tournament, Second Round
- Conference: Big Ten Conference
- Record: 23–11 (13–7 Big Ten)
- Head coach: Mick Cronin (6th season)
- Associate head coach: Darren Savino (6th season)
- Assistant coaches: Rod Palmer (6th season); Nate Georgeton (2nd season); Nemanja Jovanovic (2nd season); Brendyn Taylor (2nd season)
- Home arena: Pauley Pavilion (Capacity: 13,819)

2024–25 Big Ten Conference men's basketball standings
	Conf.				Overall
Team	W		L	PCT	W		L	PCT
No. 7 Michigan State	17	–	3	.850	30	–	7	.811
No. 9 Maryland	14	–	6	.700	27	–	9	.750
No. 10 Michigan †	14	–	6	.700	27	–	10	.730
UCLA	13	–	7	.650	23	–	11	.676
No. 16 Wisconsin	13	–	7	.650	27	–	10	.730
No. 14 Purdue	13	–	7	.650	24	–	12	.667
Illinois	12	–	8	.600	22	–	13	.629
Oregon	12	–	8	.600	25	–	10	.714
Indiana	10	–	10	.500	19	–	13	.594
Ohio State	9	–	11	.450	17	–	15	.531
Rutgers	8	–	12	.400	15	–	17	.469
Minnesota	7	–	13	.350	15	–	17	.469
Northwestern	7	–	13	.350	17	–	16	.515
USC	7	–	13	.350	17	–	18	.486
Iowa	7	–	13	.350	17	–	16	.515
Nebraska	7	–	13	.350	21	–	14	.600
Penn State	6	–	14	.300	16	–	15	.516
Washington	4	–	16	.200	13	–	18	.419
† 2025 Big Ten tournament winner Rankings from AP poll

The 2024–25 UCLA Bruins men's basketball team represented the University of California, Los Angeles during the 2024–25 NCAA Division I men's basketball season. The Bruins were led by sixth-year head coach Mick Cronin, and played their home games at Pauley Pavilion as first year members of the Big Ten Conference. They finished the season 23–11, 13–7 in Big Ten play to finish in a three-way tie for fourth place. As the No. 4 seed in the Big Ten tournament, they lost to Wisconsin in the quarterfinals. They received an at-large bid to the NCAA tournament as the No. 7 seed in the Midwest region. They defeated Utah State in the first round before losing to Tennessee in the second round.

== Offseason ==
=== Departures ===
UCLA Departures
Name	Num	Pos.	Height	Weight	Year	Hometown	Reason for Departure
Adem Bona	3	F	6'10"	245	Sophomore	Ebonyi, Nigeria	Declared for 2024 NBA draft; Selected 41st overall by Philadelphia 76ers
Will McClendon	4	G	6'3"	205	(redshirt) Sophomore	Las Vegas, NV	Transferred to San Jose State
Ilane Fibleuil	8	G	6'6"	200	Freshman	Massy, France	Returned to France to play professionally
Berke Büyüktuncel	9	F	6'9"	245	Freshman	Bursa, Turkey	Transferred to Nebraska
Kenneth Nwuba	14	F/C	6'10"	255	(redshirt) Senior	Lagos, Nigeria	Graduated
Logan Cremonesi	20	F	6'8"	225	(redshirt) Junior	Oceanside, CA	Walk-on; Graduated
Jan Vide	27	G	6'6"	200	Freshman	Domžale, Slovenia	Transferred to Loyola Marymount

Incoming transfers
Name	Num	Pos.	Height	Weight	Year	Hometown	Notes
Kobe Johnson	0	G	6'6"	200	Senior	Milwaukee, WI	USC
Eric Dailey Jr.	3	F	6'8"	230	Sophomore	Palmetto, FL	Oklahoma State
Dominick Harris	8	G	6'3"	190	(redshirt) Senior	Murrieta, CA	Loyola Marymount
William Kyle III	24	F	6'9"	230	Junior	Bellevue, NE	South Dakota State
Tyler Bilodeau	34	F	6'9"	220	Junior	Kennewick, WA	Oregon State
Skyy Clark	55	G	6'3"	205	Junior	Los Angeles, California	Louisville

=== 2024 recruiting class ===
College recruiting information
Name	Hometown	School	Height	Weight	Commit date
Trent Perry #2 G	North Hollywood, CA	Harvard Westlake High School	6 ft 4 in (1.93 m)	180 lb (82 kg)	May 8, 2024
Trent Perry #2 G	Recruit ratings: Rivals: 247Sports: ESPN: (89)				
Eric Freeny #20 SG	Corona, CA	Centennial High School	6 ft 4 in (1.93 m)	180 lb (82 kg)	Jul 1, 2023
Eric Freeny #20 SG	Recruit ratings: Rivals: 247Sports: ESPN: (82)				
Overall recruit ranking:
Note: In many cases, Scout, Rivals, 247Sports, On3, and ESPN may conflict in their listings of height and weight.; In these cases, the average was taken. ESPN grades are on a 100-point scale.; Sources: "UCLA 2023 Basketball Commitments". Rivals.; "2024 Team Ranking". Rivals.

== Roster ==
2024–25 UCLA Bruins men's basketball team
Players
Coaches

Pos.	#	Name	Height	Weight	Year	Previous school	Hometown
G	0	Kobe Johnson	6 ft 6 in (1.98 m)	200 lb (91 kg)	Sr	USC	Milwaukee, WI
G	1	Trent Perry	6 ft 6 in (1.98 m)	180 lb (82 kg)	Fr	Harvard-Westlake	West Covina, CA
G	2	Dylan Andrews	6 ft 2 in (1.88 m)	180 lb (82 kg)	Jr	Compass Prep	Gardena, CA
F	3	Eric Dailey Jr.	6 ft 8 in (2.03 m)	230 lb (104 kg)	So	Oklahoma State	Palmetto, FL
G/F	5	Brandon Williams (redshirt)	6 ft 7 in (2.01 m)	220 lb (100 kg)	So	Christ the King HS	Queens, NY
G	7	Christian Horry (W) (redshirt)	6 ft 2 in (1.88 m)	175 lb (79 kg)	Fr	Harvard-Westlake	La Cañada, CA
G	8	Dominick Harris	6 ft 3 in (1.91 m)	190 lb (86 kg)	RS Sr	Loyola Marymount	Murrieta, CA
G	10	Lazar Stefanović	6 ft 7 in (2.01 m)	190 lb (86 kg)	Sr	Utah	Belgrade, Serbia
G	12	Sebastian Mack	6 ft 3 in (1.91 m)	200 lb (91 kg)	So	Coronado HS	Chicago, IL
G	13	Eric Freeny (redshirt)	6 ft 4 in (1.93 m)	200 lb (91 kg)	Fr	Centennial HS	Corona, CA
C	15	Aday Mara	7 ft 3 in (2.21 m)	240 lb (109 kg)	So	IES El Picarral	Zaragoza, Spain
F	21	Evan Manjikian (W)	6 ft 8 in (2.03 m)	235 lb (107 kg)	RS So	Sierra Canyon	Glendale, CA
F	22	Devin Williams (redshirt)	6 ft 10 in (2.08 m)	200 lb (91 kg)	So	Centennial HS	Riverside, CA
F	24	William Kyle III	6 ft 9 in (2.06 m)	230 lb (104 kg)	Jr	South Dakota State	Bellevue, NE
G	30	Jack Seidler (W)	6 ft 4 in (1.93 m)	200 lb (91 kg)	RS So	Marlboro HS	Marlboro, NJ
F	34	Tyler Bilodeau	6 ft 9 in (2.06 m)	230 lb (104 kg)	Jr	Oregon State	Kennewick, WA
G	55	Skyy Clark	6 ft 3 in (1.91 m)	205 lb (93 kg)	Jr	Louisville	Los Angeles, CA

Head coach

- Mick Cronin (Cincinnati)

Assistant coach(es)

- Darren Savino (New Jersey City)
- Rod Palmer (UC Irvine)
- Nate Georgeton (Cincinnati)
- Nemanja Jovanovic (Belgrade)
- Brendyn Taylor (USC)

Legend

- (C) Team captain
- (S) Suspended
- (I) Ineligible
- (W) Walk-on
- Injured
- Current redshirt

Roster

== Schedule and results ==
Date time, TV	Rank^{#}	Opponent^{#}	Result	Record	High points	High rebounds	High assists	Site (attendance) city, state
Exhibition
October 30, 2024*; 7:00 p.m., B1G+	No. 22	Cal State Los Angeles	W 100–64		24 – Bilodeau	7 – Dailey	11 – Johnson	Pauley Pavilion (3,055); Los Angeles, CA
Regular season
November 4, 2024*; 7:30 p.m., FS1	No. 22	Rider	W 85–50	1–0	18 – Bilodeau	8 – Dailey	7 – Clark	Pauley Pavilion (4,489); Los Angeles, CA
November 8, 2024*; 8:00 p.m., CBSSN	No. 22	vs. New Mexico; Las Vegas Hoopfest	L 64–72	1–1	23 – Bilodeau	15 – Bilodeau	5 – Johnson	Lee's Family Forum; Henderson, NV
November 11, 2024*; 7:00 p.m., BTN		Boston University	W 71–40	2–1	13 – Tied	7 – Mara	4 – Johnson	Pauley Pavilion (5,108); Los Angeles, CA
November 15, 2024*; 7:00 p.m., B1G+		Lehigh	W 85–45	3–1	17 – Dailey	10 – Dailey	4 – Johnson	Pauley Pavilion (4,484); Los Angeles, CA
November 20, 2024*; 8:00 p.m., BTN		Idaho State	W 84–70	4–1	21 – Mack	7 – Dailey	4 – Andrews	Pauley Pavilion (4,059); Los Angeles, CA
November 22, 2024*; 7:00 p.m., BTN		Cal State Fullerton	W 80–47	5–1	12 – Johnson	6 – Johnson	5 – Johnson	Pauley Pavilion (5,078); Los Angeles, CA
November 26, 2024*; 7:00 p.m., BTN		Southern Utah	W 88–43	6–1	19 – Stefanović	8 – Mara	5 – Perry	Pauley Pavilion (4,311); Los Angeles, CA
December 3, 2024; 7:30 p.m., FS1		Washington	W 69–58	7–1 (1–0)	16 – Tied	9 – Bilodeau	4 – Dailey	Pauley Pavilion (6,089); Los Angeles, CA
December 8, 2024; 3:00 p.m., BTN		at No. 12 Oregon	W 73–71	8–1 (2–0)	19 – Dailey	5 – Tied	3 – Mack	Matthew Knight Arena (8,133); Eugene, OR
December 14, 2024*; 12:00 p.m., ESPN2	No. 24	vs. Arizona; Rivalry	W 57–54	9–1	17 – Bilodeau	7 – Johnson	4 – Johnson	Footprint Center (8,437); Phoenix, AZ
December 17, 2024*; 6:30 p.m., BTN	No. 18	Prairie View A&M	W 111–75	10–1	21 – Andrews	11 – Mara	7 – Johnson	Pauley Pavilion (5,017); Los Angeles, CA
December 21, 2024*; 12:00 p.m., CBS	No. 18	vs. North Carolina; CBS Sports Classic	L 74–76	10–2	26 – Bilodeau	6 – Tied	4 – Clark	Madison Square Garden (19,812); New York, NY
December 28, 2024*; 1:00 p.m., FOX	No. 22	vs. No. 14 Gonzaga; West Coast Hoops Showdown	W 65–62	11–2	18 – Dailey	9 – Clark	7 – Clark	Intuit Dome (12,272); Inglewood, CA
January 4, 2025; 11:00 a.m., FOX	No. 15	at Nebraska	L 58–66	11–3 (2–1)	15 – Bilodeau	11 – Johnson	6 – Mack	Pinnacle Bank Arena (15,167); Lincoln, NE
January 7, 2025; 7:00 p.m., Peacock	No. 22	No. 24 Michigan	L 75–94	11–4 (2–2)	17 – Tied	7 – Mack	3 – Tied	Pauley Pavilion (11,121); Los Angeles, CA
January 10, 2025; 5:00 p.m., FOX	No. 22	at Maryland	L 61–79	11–5 (2–3)	18 – Bilodeau	6 – Johnson	4 – Johnson	Xfinity Center (15,172); College Park, MD
January 13, 2025; 3:30 p.m., FS1		at Rutgers	L 68–75	11–6 (2–4)	16 – Tied	5 – Bilodeau	3 – Tied	Jersey Mike's Arena (8,000); Piscataway, NJ
January 17, 2025; 6:00 p.m., FS1		Iowa	W 94–70	12–6 (3–4)	23 – Dailey	8 – Johnson	6 – Johnson	Pauley Pavilion (5,298); Los Angeles, CA
January 21, 2025; 6:30 p.m., Peacock		No. 18 Wisconsin	W 85–83	13–6 (4–4)	22 – Mara	5 – Tied	7 – Andrews	Pauley Pavilion (6,695); Los Angeles, CA
January 24, 2025; 8:00 p.m., FS1		at Washington	W 65–60	14–6 (5–4)	12 – Tied	9 – Johnson	3 – Tied	Alaska Airlines Arena (7,709); Seattle, WA
January 27, 2025; 7:00 p.m., FS1		at USC; Rivalry	W 82–76	15–6 (6–4)	16 – Dailey	11 – Mara	6 – Dailey	Galen Center (7,532); Los Angeles, CA
January 30, 2025; 7:30 p.m., FS1		No. 16 Oregon	W 78–52	16–6 (7–4)	21 – Dailey	6 – Bilodeau	5 – Clark	Pauley Pavilion (9,288); Los Angeles, CA
February 4, 2025; 7:00 p.m., Peacock		No. 9 Michigan State	W 63–61	17–6 (8–4)	14 – Clark	5 – Dailey	4 – Andrews	Pauley Pavilion (10,074); Los Angeles, CA
February 8, 2025; 1:00 p.m., BTN		Penn State	W 78–54	18–6 (9–4)	15 – Johnson	13 – Johnson	6 – Johnson	Pauley Pavilion (9,156); Los Angeles, CA
February 11, 2025; 5:00 p.m., Peacock		at Illinois	L 78–83	18–7 (9–5)	25 – Bilodeau	4 – Johnson	7 – Andrews	State Farm Center (15,544); Champaign, IL
February 14, 2025; 5:00 p.m., FOX		at Indiana	W 72–68	19–7 (10–5)	12 – Bilodeau	6 – Tied	3 – Tied	Simon Skjodt Assembly Hall (17,222); Bloomington, IN
February 18, 2025; 7:30 p.m., FS1		Minnesota	L 61–64	19–8 (10–6)	13 – Mack	6 – Bilodeau	5 – Andrews	Pauley Pavilion (7,523); Los Angeles, CA
February 23, 2025; 12:45 p.m., CBS		Ohio State; Bill Walton tribute	W 69–61	20–8 (11–6)	20 – Dailey Jr.	13 – Johnson	4 – Tied	Pauley Pavilion (9,015); Los Angeles, CA
February 28, 2025; 5:00 p.m., FOX		at No. 20 Purdue	L 66–76	20–9 (11–7)	15 – Bilodeau	7 – Bilodeau	5 – Johnson	Mackey Arena (14,876); West Lafayette, IN
March 3, 2025; 6:00 p.m., FS1		at Northwestern	W 73–69	21–9 (12–7)	19 – Bilodeau	10 – Mara	7 – Clark	Welsh–Ryan Arena (6,099); Evanston, IL
March 8, 2025; 5:00 p.m., FOX		USC; Rivalry, Senior Day	W 90–63	22–9 (13–7)	25 – Dailey Jr.	8 – Johnson	7 – Andrews	Pauley Pavilion (12,018); Los Angeles, CA
Big Ten Tournament
March 14, 2025; 11:30 a.m., BTN	(4)	vs. (5) No. 18 Wisconsin; Quarterfinals	L 70–86	22–10	18 – Mack	9 – Bilodeau	3 – Tied	Gainbridge Fieldhouse (13,298); Indianapolis, IN
NCAA Tournament
March 20, 2025*; 6:25 p.m., TNT	(7 MW)	vs. (10 MW) Utah State; First Round	W 72–47	23–10	14 – Tied	8 – Johnson	8 – Andrews	Rupp Arena (16,258); Lexington, KY
March 22, 2025*; 6:40 p.m., TBS	(7 MW)	vs. (2 MW) No. 6 Tennessee; Second Round	L 58–67	23–11	18 – Clark	5 – Mara	3 – Mara	Rupp Arena (17,484); Lexington, KY
*Non-conference game. ^{#}Rankings from AP Poll. (#) Tournament seedings in parentheses. MW=Midwest. All times are in Pacific Time.

== Rankings ==
Ranking movements Legend: ██ Increase in ranking ██ Decrease in ranking — = Not ranked RV = Received votes
	Week																				
Poll	Pre	1	2	3	4	5	6	7	8	9	10	11	12	13	14	15	16	17	18	19	Final
AP	22	—	—	RV	RV	24	18	22	15	22	—	—	RV	RV	RV	RV	RV	RV	RV	RV	RV
Coaches	22	RV	—	RV	RV	21	18	21	18	21	RV	RV	—	RV	RV	RV	RV	RV	RV	RV	RV

== Awards and honors ==
- March 11, 2025 – Kobe Johnson was named to the Big Ten All-Defensive Team
- March 11, 2025 – Tyler Bilodeau was named to the All-Big Ten Conference third-team
- March 18, 2025 – Tyler Bilodeau was named to the NABC All-Pacific District first-team
- March 19, 2025 – Jack Seidler and Lazar Stefanović were named to the Winter Academic All-Big Ten Team
