= Fisher Stadium =

College football field of Lafayette College in Easton, Pennsylvania

- Fisher
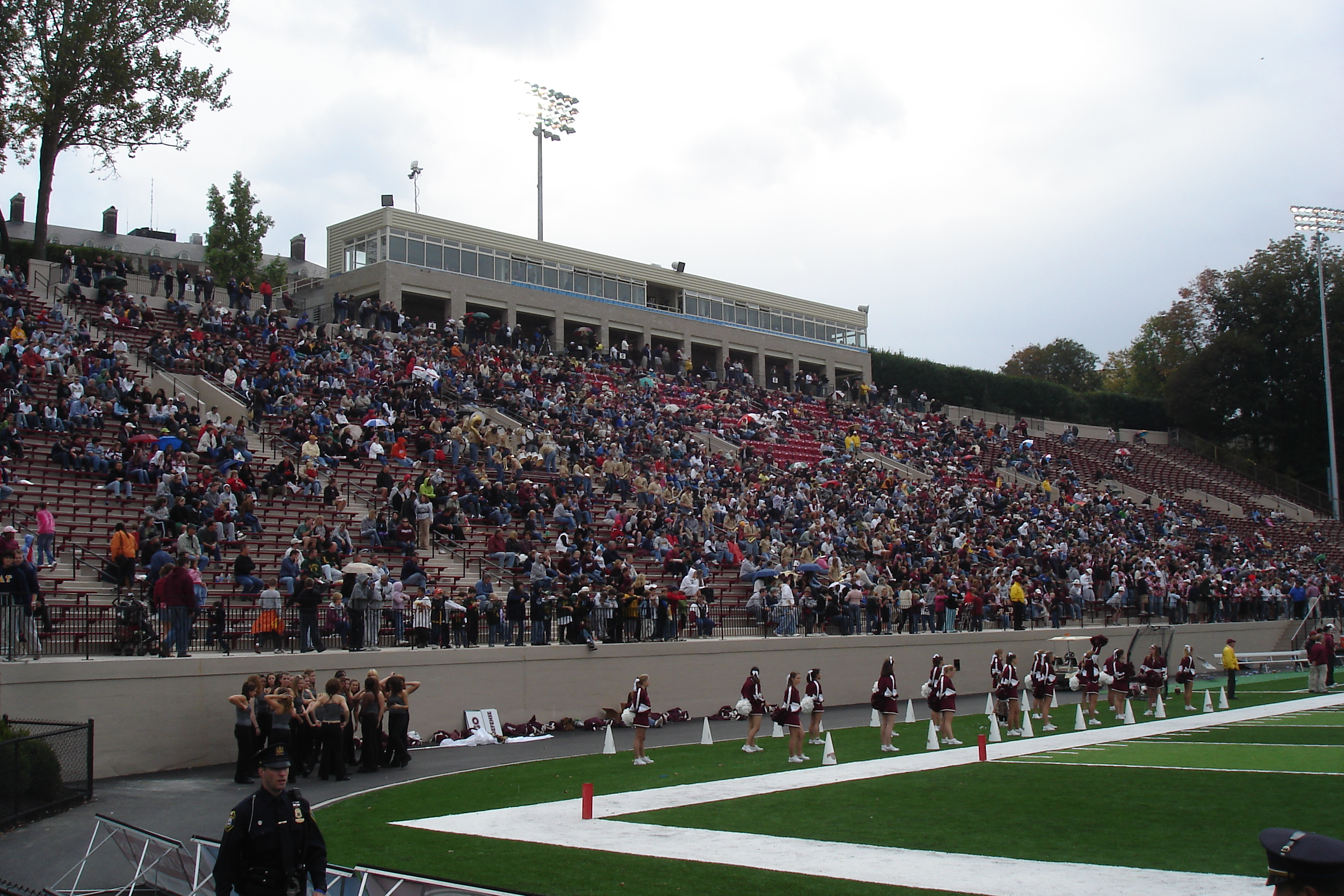
- Fisher Stadium, September 2006
- Interactive map of Fisher Stadium
- Former names: Fisher Field; Lafayette Stadium
- Location: 218 Hamilton Street; Easton, Pennsylvania 18042
- Coordinates: 40°42′3″N 75°12′38″W
- Owner: Lafayette College
- Operator: Lafayette College
- Capacity: 13,132
- Surface: FieldTurf (2006–present); Natural grass (1926–2005)
- Record attendance: 21,000 vs. Lehigh, 1948

Construction
- Groundbreaking: Summer 1925
- Opened: September 25, 1926
- Cost: $445,000 ($8.09 million in 2025 dollars)
- Architect: Edwards-Dunn Co.

Tenant
- Lafayette Leopards (NCAA) (1926–present)

Fisher Stadium is a 13,132-seat multi-purpose stadium in Easton, Pennsylvania. The stadium is home to the Lafayette College Leopards football team. It opened in 1926 as Fisher Field.

During 2006 and 2007, Fisher Field underwent a $33-million renovation. It reopened in time for the 2006 college football season complete with new seating, a JumboTron, a new press box, FieldTurf, and field lighting. Construction of a Football Varsity House beyond the western endzone commenced in Fall 2006 and was completed before the 2007 season.

== History ==
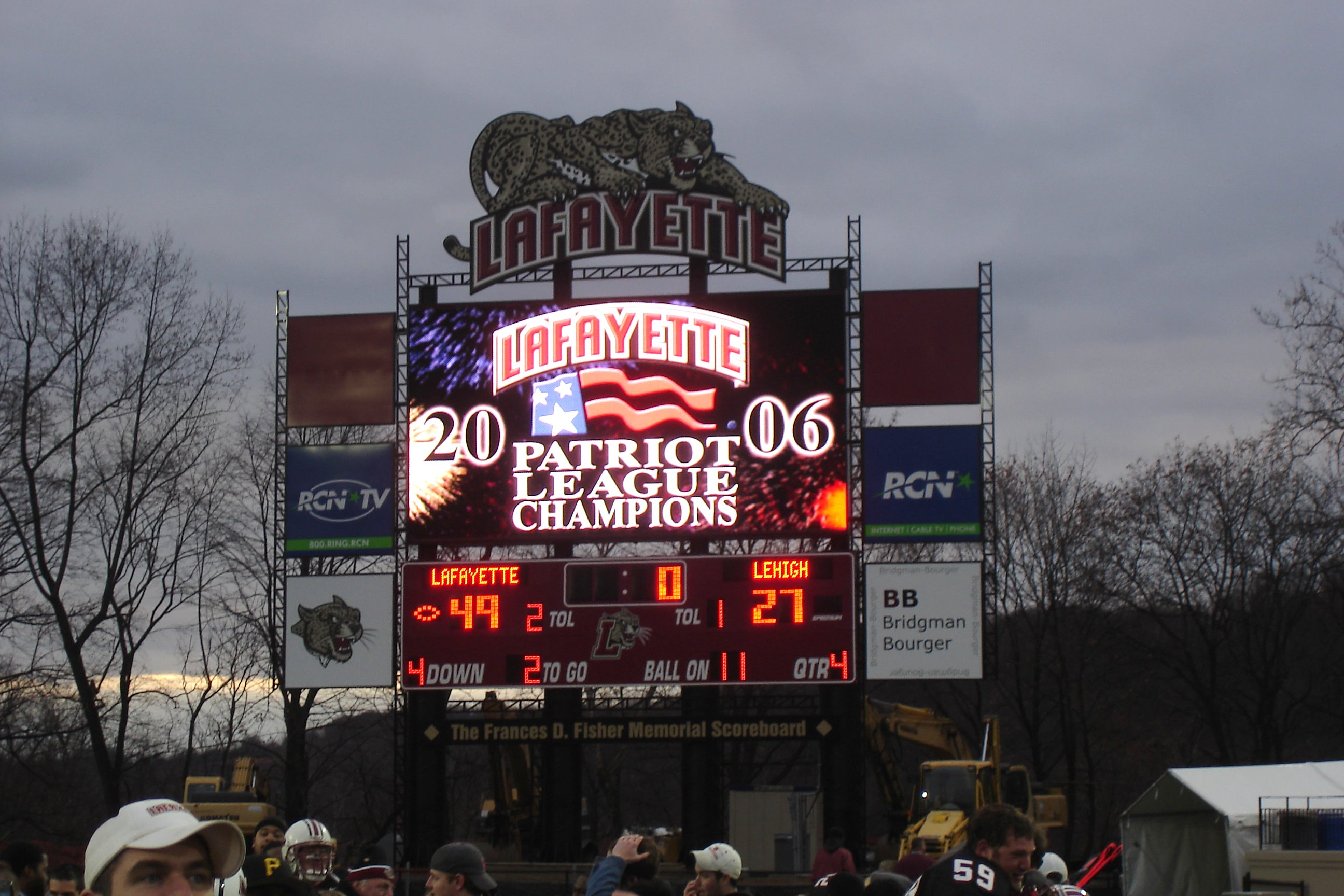
Fisher Stadium's scoreboard following Lafayette College's victory over Lehigh University in the 142nd edition of "The Rivalry" in 2006. The series between the two colleges, which are 17 miles (27 km) away from each other in the Lehigh Valley, is the most-played rivalry in college football history with 158 meetings since 1884.

Erected in 1926, Fisher Field was named for Thomas Fisher, Lafayette College Class of 1888, who almost single-handedly raised the $445,000 needed for construction through fund-raising efforts and a sizable personal contribution.

The first football game played in the 18,000-seat structure came on September 25, 1926, with a 35-0 Leopard victory over Muhlenberg College.

In 1973, during the construction of Allan P. Kirby Field House, more than 4,500 seats were removed from the north stands to make room for the structure.

A $33 million renovation in 2006 and 2007 brought new spectator seating throughout the venue, including chair back seating in select areas, and additional visitor-side seating. A state-of-the-art FieldTurf surface, lights, and a press box were installed, and improved restroom and vending areas were also included. A 19-by-35 foot video matrix board, located in the northwest corner of the stadium, provides the Lafayette Sports Network telecast of the game and features "in-house" entertainment for Leopard fans.

The facility seats 13,132, with additional seating for 2,075 added for the Nov. 18 meeting with Lehigh University, which raised the capacity to 15,207.

The Leopards posted their inaugural victory at Fisher Field on November 11, 2006, when Lafayette defeated Georgetown, 45-14. Lafayette wide receiver Joe Ort set the single-game school record with 274 yards receiving in that contest.

On September 1, 2007, Lafayette opened its season hosting the first ever night football game at Fisher Stadium. Lafayette defeated Marist College of the Metro Atlantic Athletic Conference 49-10.

Jim Finnen was the public-address announcer at Fisher Field for 50 years. He retired in 2014.

== The Rivalry ==
When Lafayette College is host for The Rivalry with Lehigh University every other year, more than 3,500 temporary seats are erected to accommodate the sellout crowd of 17,000. These temporary seats are left standing during the week for use at the Phillipsburg-Easton game. Thus the total number of seats for the high school football game vary from year to year.

To commemorate the 150th edition of The Rivalry, the 2014 contest, a Lafayette home game, was held at Yankee Stadium.

== Hosting the Easton-Phillipsburg game ==
Fisher Field at Fisher Stadium acts as neutral site for the traditional high school football rivalry between Easton Area High School in Easton and Phillipsburg High School of Phillipsburg, New Jersey. In 2006, the game between the two teams was televised nationally on ESPN2 as part of the High School Showcase. Easton won that game 21-7, the 100th meeting of these two cross-state rivals.

== Panorama ==
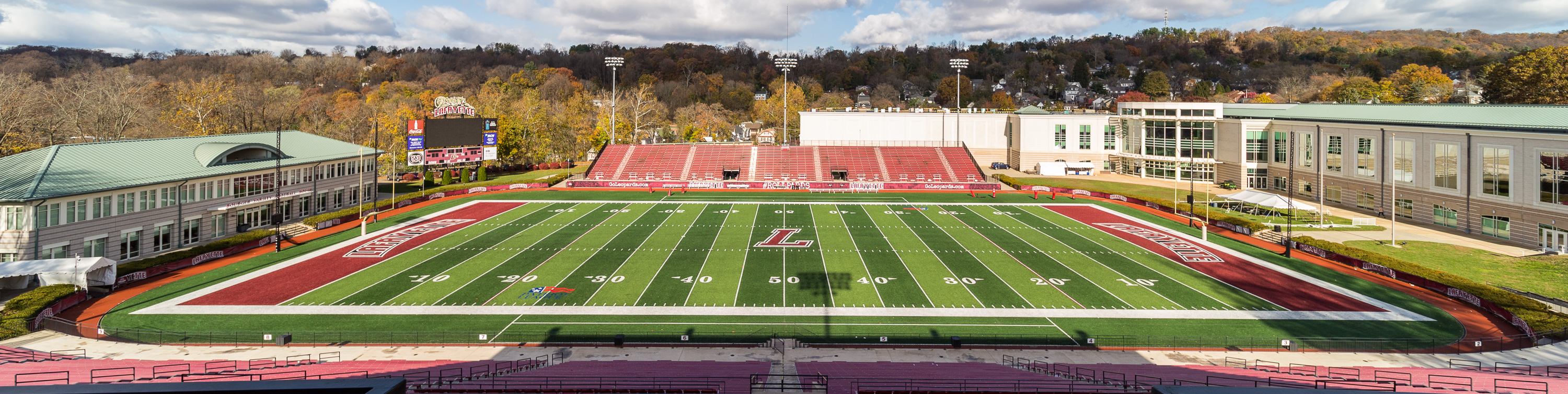
Fisher Stadium, November 2019

== See also ==
- List of NCAA Division I FCS football stadiums
