= Kanaan Carlyle =

American basketball player (born 2004)

No. 18 – Florida Atlantic Owls
- Position: Point guard / shooting guard
- League: American Athletic Conference

Personal information
- Born: September 25, 2004 (age 22)
- Listed height: 6 ft 3 in (1.91 m)
- Listed weight: 182 lb (83 kg)

Career information
- High school: Milton (Milton, Georgia); Overtime Elite Academy (Atlanta, Georgia)
- College: Stanford (2023–2024); Indiana (2024–2025); Florida Atlantic (2025-present)
Medals
Men's basketball
Representing United States
FIBA Americas Under-18 Championship
Gold medal – first place	2022 Mexico	Team

Kanaan Carlyle (born September 25, 2004) is an American college basketball player on the Florida Atlantic Owls. He previously played for the Indiana Hoosiers of the Big Ten Conference and the Stanford Cardinal of the Pac-12 Conference.

== Early life and high school ==
Carlyle grew up in Atlanta, Georgia and initially attended Milton High School. After his junior year, Carlyle opted to leave Milton to join the Overtime Elite league as a non-professional player for team YNG Dreamerz in order to preserve his collegiate eligibility.

== College career ==
Carlyle began his college career at Stanford. He averaged 11.5 points, 2.7 rebounds, and 2.7 assists per game as a freshman. After the season, Carlyle entered the NCAA transfer portal.

Carlyle transferred to Indiana. At Indiana, Carlyle averaged 4 points, 1.6 rebounds, and 1.2 assists per game. At the end of the season Carlyle entered his name into the transfer portal.

Carlyle transferred to Florida Atlantic.

== National team career ==
Carlyle played for the United States under-18 basketball team at the 2022 FIBA Under-18 Americas Championship. He averaged 4.0 points and 2.8 rebounds rebounds per game as the United States won the gold medal.

== Career statistics ==
Legend
GP	Games played	GS	Games started	MPG	Minutes per game
FG%	Field goal percentage	3P%	3-point field goal percentage	FT%	Free throw percentage
RPG	Rebounds per game	APG	Assists per game	SPG	Steals per game
BPG	Blocks per game	PPG	Points per game	**Bold**	Career high

=== College ===
Year	Team	GP	GS	MPG	FG%	3P%	FT%	RPG	APG	SPG	BPG	PPG
2023–24	Stanford	23	**16**	**25.6**	**.386**	**.320**	**.776**	**2.7**	**2.7**	.4	**.6**	**11.5**
2024–25	Indiana	**25**	6	16.2	.289	.243	.429	1.6	1.2	**.5**	.2	4.0
Career		48	22	20.7	.349	.288	.727	2.1	1.9	.5	.4	7.6
