= Drake Powell =

American basketball player (born 2005)

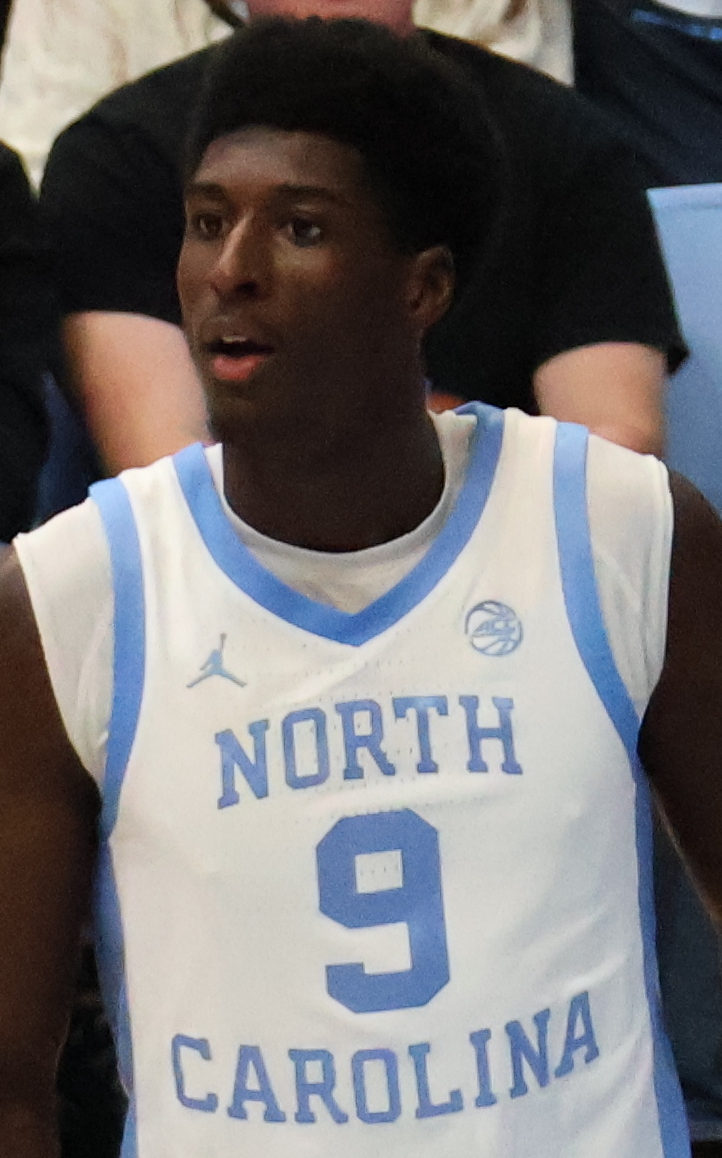
- Powell with North Carolina in 2025

No. 4 – Brooklyn Nets
- Position: Shooting guard / small forward
- League: NBA

Personal information
- Born: September 8, 2005 (age 21) Durham, North Carolina, U.S.
- Listed height: 6 ft 6 in (1.98 m)
- Listed weight: 212 lb (96 kg)

Career information
- High school: Northwood (Pittsboro, North Carolina)
- College: North Carolina (2024–2025)
- NBA draft: 2025: 1st round, 22nd overall pick
- Drafted by: Atlanta Hawks
- Playing career: 2025–present

Career history
- 2025–present: Brooklyn Nets
- 2025–2026: →Long Island Nets

Career highlights
- McDonald's All-American (2024); Jordan Brand Classic (2024)
- Stats at NBA.com
- Stats at Basketball Reference

Drake Edward Powell (born September 8, 2005) is an American professional basketball player for the Brooklyn Nets of the National Basketball Association (NBA). He played college basketball for the North Carolina Tar Heels. He was a consensus five-star recruit and one of the top players in the 2024 class.

== Early life and high school career ==
Powell grew up in Pittsboro, North Carolina and attended Northwood High School. He averaged 18.6 points, seven rebounds, and 3.9 assists per game as a junior. He put up averages of 17.7 points, 7.9 rebounds, and 4.5 assists per game along with 2.2 steals and 1.2 blocks during his senior year. Powell was selected to play in the 2024 McDonald's All-American Boys Game during his senior year.

=== Recruiting ===
Powell was considered a five-star recruit by most major recruiting services and was one of the top players in the 2024 class. He committed to playing college basketball for North Carolina over offers from Florida State, NC State, Texas A&M, Tennessee, Wake Forest, Miami (Florida), and Georgia. Powell signed a National Letter of Intent to play for the Tar Heels on November 16, 2023, during the early signing period.

College recruiting
Name	Hometown	School	Height	Weight	Commit date
Drake Powell; SG / SF	Pittsboro, NC	Northwood (NC)	6 ft 6 in (1.98 m)	195 lb (88 kg)	Sep 8, 2022
Drake Powell; SG / SF	Recruit ratings: Rivals: 247Sports: On3: ESPN: (92)				
Overall recruit ranking: Rivals: 15 247Sports: 11 On3: 16 ESPN: 14
Note: In many cases, Scout, Rivals, 247Sports, On3, and ESPN may conflict in their listings of height and weight.; In these cases, the average was taken. ESPN grades are on a 100-point scale.; Sources: "North Carolina 2024 Basketball Commitments". Rivals.; "2024 North Carolina Tar Heels Recruiting Class". ESPN.; "2024 Team Ranking". Rivals.

== College career ==
In his freshman season, Powell played in all 37 of the Tar Heels' games, starting 24, becoming a main piece in the rotation down the stretch of the season. Noted for his defensive versatility and ability, Powell anchored a Tar Heel defense that struggled at times during the 2024–25 campaign. This was highlighted by his season averages of 0.7 steals and 0.7 blocks. Offensively, he averaged 7.4 points per game, shooting 48% from the field and 38% from three-point range. Following the season, he declared for the 2025 NBA draft.

== Professional career ==
Powell was drafted in the first round by the Atlanta Hawks with the 22nd overall pick in the 2025 NBA draft. His draft rights were later traded to the Brooklyn Nets.

== Career statistics ==
Legend
GP	Games played	GS	Games started	MPG	Minutes per game
FG%	Field goal percentage	3P%	3-point field goal percentage	FT%	Free throw percentage
RPG	Rebounds per game	APG	Assists per game	SPG	Steals per game
BPG	Blocks per game	PPG	Points per game	**Bold**	Career high

=== NBA ===
Year	Team	GP	GS	MPG	FG%	3P%	FT%	RPG	APG	SPG	BPG	PPG
2025–26	Brooklyn	63	24	21.0	.402	.280	.896	1.8	1.4	.6	.2	6.5
Career		63	24	21.0	.402	.280	.896	1.8	1.4	.6	.2	6.5

=== College ===
Year	Team	GP	GS	MPG	FG%	3P%	FT%	RPG	APG	SPG	BPG	PPG
2024–25	North Carolina	37	24	25.6	.483	.379	.648	3.4	1.1	.7	.7	7.4

== Personal life ==
Powell is the son of Dedric and Cherice Powell. His father played baseball at UNC, and his mother was an all-state high school basketball player and also attended UNC. His sister, Cera, played volleyball at Virginia Tech and UConn. His brother Deuce was a three-sport standout at Northwood, who played basketball at Louisburg College and also attended North Carolina A&T.

Powell is a cousin of UNC head coach Hubert Davis. His grandmother is Davis's aunt.
