= Liam McNeeley =

American basketball player (born 2005)

No. 33 – Charlotte Hornets
- Position: Small forward
- League: NBA

Personal information
- Born: October 10, 2005 (age 21) Richardson, Texas, U.S.
- Listed height: 6 ft 8 in (2.03 m)
- Listed weight: 210 lb (95 kg)

Career information
- High school: Pearce (Richardson, Texas); John Paul II (Plano, Texas); Montverde Academy (Montverde, Florida)
- College: UConn (2024–2025)
- NBA draft: 2025: 1st round, 29th overall pick
- Drafted by: Phoenix Suns
- Playing career: 2025–present

Career history
- 2025–present: Charlotte Hornets
- 2025–2026: →Greensboro Swarm

Career highlights
- NBA G League champion (2026); Third-team All-Big East (2025); Big East Freshman of the Year (2025); McDonald's All-American (2024)
- Stats at NBA.com
- Stats at Basketball Reference
Medals
Men's basketball
FIBA Americas Under-16 Championship
Gold medal – first place	2021 Mexico	Team

Liam Thomas McNeeley (born October 10, 2005) is an American professional basketball player for the Charlotte Hornets of the National Basketball Association (NBA). He played college basketball for the UConn Huskies. He was a consensus five-star recruit and one of the top players in the 2024 class.

== Early life and high school career ==
McNeeley grew up in Richardson, Texas and initially attended J. J. Pearce High School. He transferred to John Paul II High School in Plano, Texas after his freshman year. McNeeley averaged 17 points, nine rebounds, five assists, two steals and two blocks per game as a sophomore. After the season, McNeeley transferred a second time to Montverde Academy in Montverde, Florida. He averaged 13.7 points, 4.5 rebounds, and 1.2 steals in National Interscholastic Basketball Conference (NIBC) competition in his first season at Montverde. McNeeley averaged 12.5 points, 3.8 rebounds, and 2.8 assists per game for his senior year. McNeeley was selected to play in the 2024 McDonald's All-American Boys Game during his senior year.

=== Recruiting ===
McNeeley was a consensus five-star recruit and one of the top players in the 2024 class, according to major recruiting services. He committed to playing college basketball for Indiana after considering offers from Kansas and Texas. McNeeley signed a National Letter of Intent (NLI) to play for the Indiana Hoosiers on November 8, 2023, during the early signing period. However, he requested a release from his NLI on March 7, 2024, shortly after Indiana announced that they would retain head coach Mike Woodson. McNeeley committed to UConn on April 26, 2024.

College recruiting
Name	Hometown	School	Height	Weight	Commit date
Liam McNeeley; SF / PF	Richardson, TX	Montverde Academy (FL)	6 ft 7 in (2.01 m)	210 lb (95 kg)	Apr 26, 2024
Liam McNeeley; SF / PF	Recruit ratings: Rivals: 247Sports: On3: ESPN: (93)				
Overall recruit ranking: Rivals: 17 247Sports: 10 On3: 15 ESPN: 9
Note: In many cases, Scout, Rivals, 247Sports, On3, and ESPN may conflict in their listings of height and weight.; In these cases, the average was taken. ESPN grades are on a 100-point scale.; Sources: "UConn 2024 Basketball Commitments". Rivals.; "2024 UConn Huskies Recruiting Class". ESPN.; "2024 Team Ranking". Rivals.

== College career ==
McNeeley enrolled at the University of Connecticut in June 2024 in order to take part in the Huskies' summer practices. He made his college basketball debut on November 6, posting a double-double with 18 points and 10 rebounds in a win over Sacred Heart. Three days later, McNeeley recorded 10 points and 11 rebounds against New Hampshire, becoming the first freshman to log back-to-back double-doubles since Corny Thompson in 1978. On November 17, McNeeley earned Big East Freshman of the Week honors for his 15-point performance in a 90–49 victory over Le Moyne. After leading the Huskies to a 2–0 week, he was named Big East Freshman of the Week again on December 9, sharing the honor with teammate Alex Karaban. On December 14, McNeeley delivered a dominant performance against No. 8 Gonzaga at Madison Square Garden, scoring 26 points along with eight rebounds and four assists. Following this performance, he earned another Big East Freshman of the Week honor. For the third consecutive week and fourth time overall, McNeeley was named Big East Freshman of the Week on December 23 after helping the team to another 2–0 week. On February 11, 2025, McNeely scored a game-high 38 points and grabbed 10 rebounds in a win over Creighton, recording the most points by a UConn freshman in conference history. On February 17, he was again named Big East Freshman of the Week after averaging team-highs of 24.5 points and 9.5 rebounds per game. On February 24, McNeeley earned his sixth Big East Freshman of the Week honor after leading the team to a comeback win over Villanova with 20 points and 7 rebounds. After averaging 15.5 points, 3.5 assists, and three rebounds in a 2–0 week, McNeeley was named Big East Freshman of the Week again on March 3, marking his seventh time receiving the award. On March 11, the conference named McNeeley as the Big East Freshman of the Year. McNeeley concluded his college career having earned Third Team All-Big East and Big East All-Freshman Team honors. On April 1, he declared for the 2025 NBA draft, foregoing his remaining college eligibility.

== Professional career ==
McNeely was selected with the 29th pick by the Phoenix Suns in the 2025 NBA draft. However, on June 30, 2025, he would have his draft rights traded to the Charlotte Hornets, along with Vasilije Micić and a 2029 first-round pick in exchange for center Mark Williams and a 2029 second-round pick.

== National team career ==
McNeeley played for the United States national under-16 team at the 2021 FIBA Under-16 Americas Championship. He averaged 5.7 points and five rebounds per game as the United States won the gold medal.

== Career statistics ==
Legend
GP	Games played	GS	Games started	MPG	Minutes per game
FG%	Field goal percentage	3P%	3-point field goal percentage	FT%	Free throw percentage
RPG	Rebounds per game	APG	Assists per game	SPG	Steals per game
BPG	Blocks per game	PPG	Points per game	**Bold**	Career high

=== NBA ===
Year	Team	GP	GS	MPG	FG%	3P%	FT%	RPG	APG	SPG	BPG	PPG
2025–26	Charlotte	31	0	11.9	.400	.400	.821	2.4	.8	.2	.1	4.3
Career		31	0	11.9	.400	.400	.821	2.4	.8	.2	.1	4.3

=== College ===
Year	Team	GP	GS	MPG	FG%	3P%	FT%	RPG	APG	SPG	BPG	PPG
2024–25	UConn	27	26	32.1	.381	.317	.866	6.0	2.3	.6	.2	14.5

NBA

== Personal life ==
McNeeley's great-grandfather (Gordan Elsey), grandfather (Chuck Elsey), mother (Ashley Elsey), and two of his uncles (Chad Elsey and Josh Ihde) played college basketball.
