= Word of God Christian Academy =

Private, Christian, college-Preparatory school in North Carolina

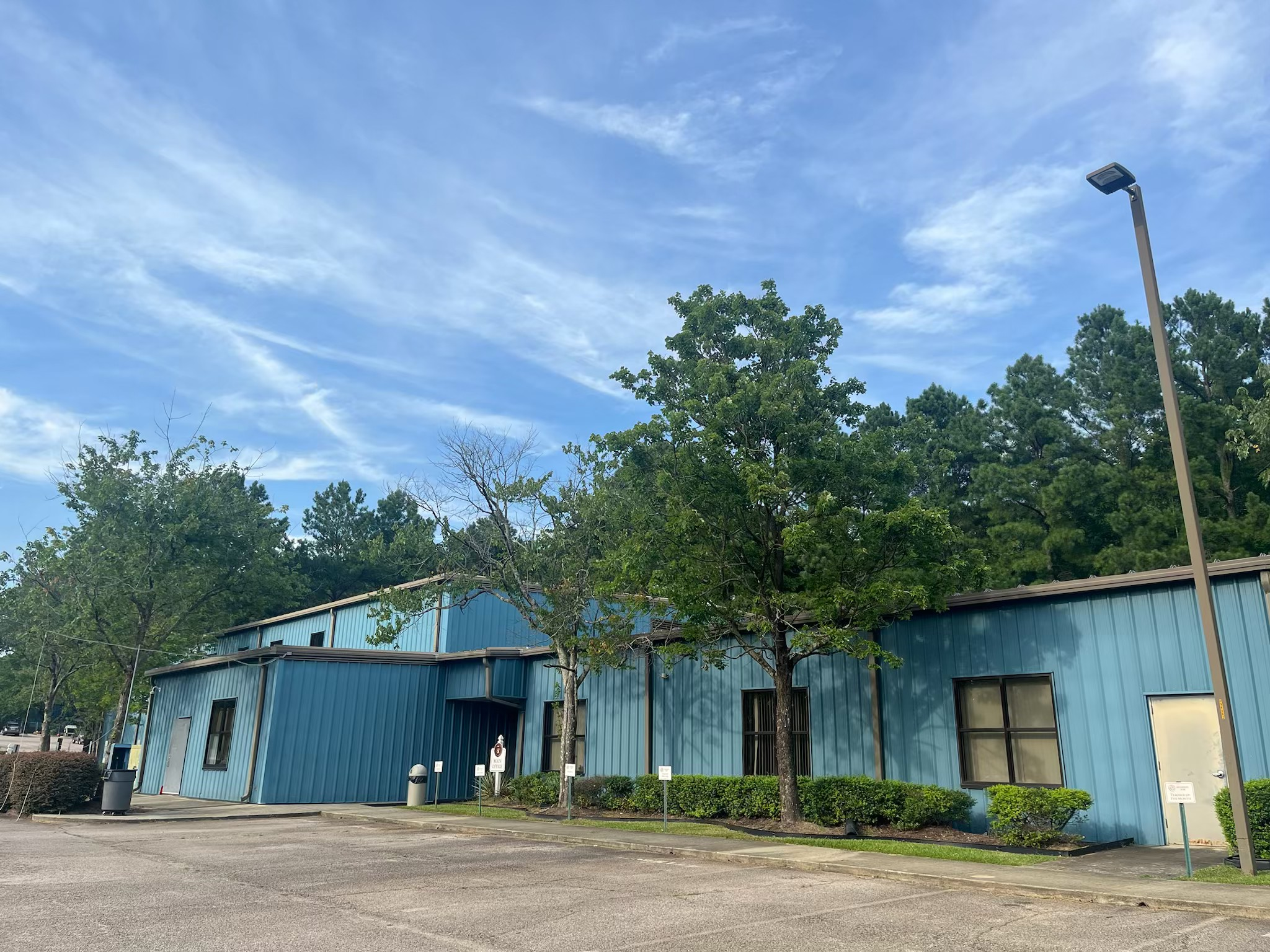

Location
- 3000 Rock Quarry Road; Raleigh, North Carolina 27610; United States; 35°44′46″N 78°35′52″W

Information
- Type: Private, Christian, day, college preparatory school
- Religious affiliation: Christian
- Denomination: Non-denominational
- Established: 1993 (33 years ago)
- CEEB code: 343242
- Principal: Anesha Pittman
- Faculty: 18
- Grades: K–12
- Gender: Co-Educational
- Enrollment: 172
- Campus type: Suburban
- Colors: Purple and gold
- Nickname: Holy Rams
- Accreditation: Cognia
- Tuition: $6,350 (grades 6–12) $6,250 (grades K–5)
- Affiliation: Summerfield Ministries
- Website: www.wordofgodchristianacademy.org

Word of God Christian Academy is a private, Christian, coeducational, primary and secondary day school located in Raleigh, North Carolina, United States. Also known as Word of God, the school was founded in 1993.

In 2015, a North Carolina think tank found that Word of God received $180,600 in public funds through the state's voucher program for lower-income students, the most of any private school.

== History ==
Along with Word of God Fellowship Church and the affiliated daycare center, the academy was founded by Bishop Frank Summerfield, who died in 2017.

In 2006, the NCAA refused to accept diplomas from Word of God as part of an effort to crack down on diploma mills.

During the school's 2022–23 years, the basketball program joined the Our Saviour Lutheran School in New York City and Hillcrest Prep Academy in Phoenix, Arizona as a part of Overtime Elite alongside the program's own YNG Dreamerz, Cold Hearts, and City Reapers teams.

== Notable alumni ==
- Rawle Alkins (born 1997) — NBA basketball player for the Chicago Bulls, and in the Israeli Basketball Premier League
- James L. Dickey III (born 1996) — basketball player for Hapoel Haifa of the Israeli Basketball Premier League
- C. J. Leslie (born 1991) — professional basketball player
- Jayden Quaintance (born 2007) — NBA basketball player for Memphis Grizzlies
- Isaiah Todd (born 2001) — current NBA G-League player
- John Wall (born 1990) — NBA basketball player for the Los Angeles Clippers
- T. J. Warren (born 1993) — NBA player
- Dez Wells (born 1992) — professional basketball player in the Israeli Basketball Premier League
