= Donnie Freeman (basketball, born 2005) =

Bahamian basketball player (born 2005)

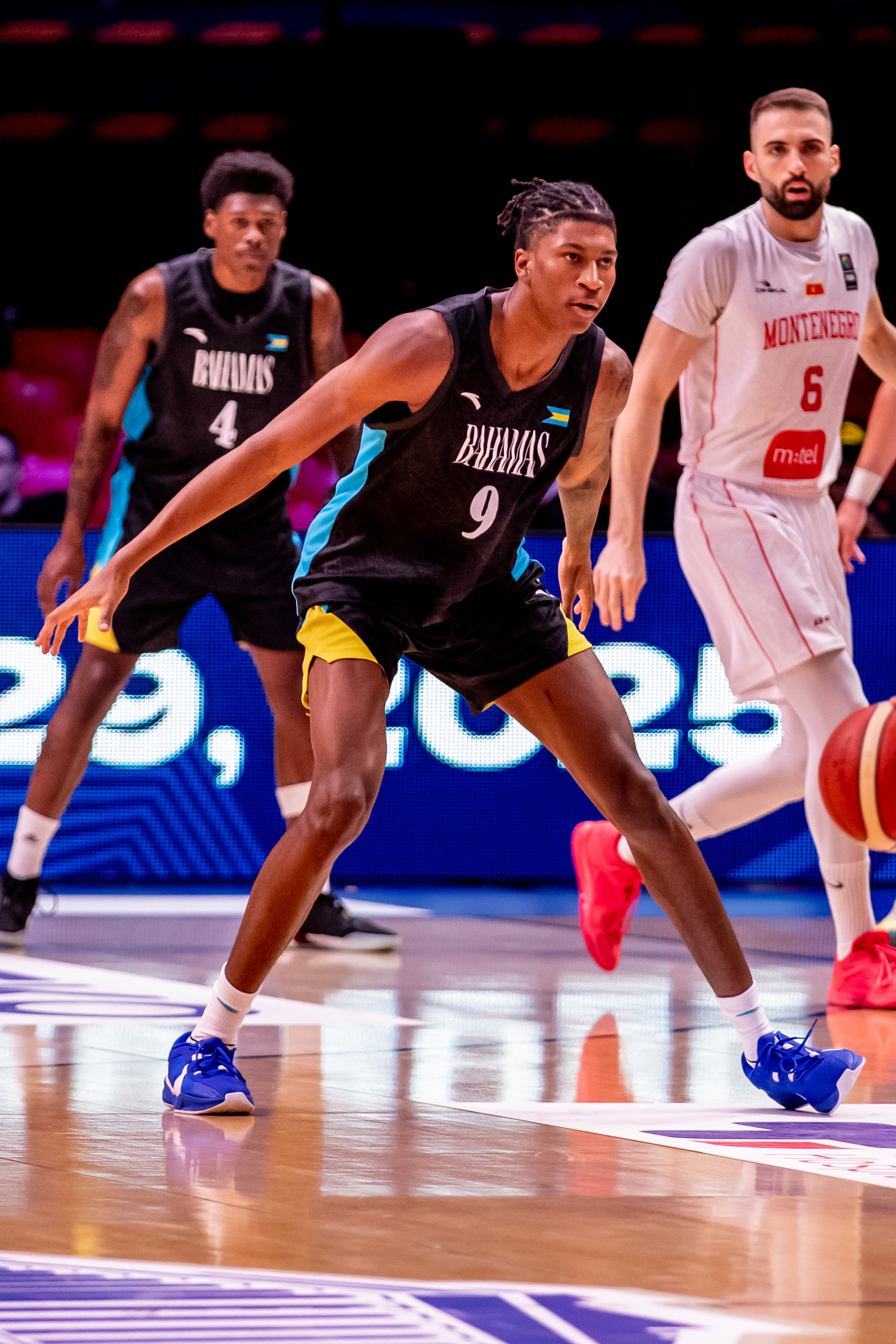
- Freeman with The Bahamas 2024

No. 1 – St. John's Red Storm
- Position: Power forward
- Conference: Big East Conference

Personal information
- Born: August 14, 2005 (age 21) Nassau, Bahamas
- Listed height: 6 ft 9 in (2.06 m)
- Listed weight: 205 lb (93 kg)

Career information
- High school: St. John's College (Washington, D.C.); IMG Academy (Bradenton, Florida)
- College: Syracuse (2024–2026); St. John's

Career highlights
- McDonald's All-American (2024); Jordan Brand Classic (2024)

Donavan Glen Lee "Donnie" Freeman (born August 14, 2005) is a Bahamian college basketball player for the St. John's Red Storm of the Big East Conference. He previously played for the Syracuse Orange. He was a consensus five-star recruit and one of the top players in the 2024 class.

== High school career ==
Freeman was born in the Bahamas and moved to Washington, D.C. when he was six. He attended St. John's College High School until his junior year. As a junior, Freeman led his team to a 32–4 overall record and won the WCAC. Before the start of his senior year, Freeman transferred to IMG Academy to play in the EYBL. In 20 regular season games, Freeman averaged 10.5 points, six rebounds, and 1.5 assists. Freeman was selected to play in the 2024 McDonald's All-American Boys Game during his senior year.

=== Recruiting ===
Freeman was a consensus five-star recruit and one of the top players in the 2024 class, according to major recruiting services. On May 11, 2023, after the conclusion of his junior year at St. John's, he committed to playing college basketball for Syracuse over offers from Alabama, Texas, Iowa, and Georgia Tech, making him the highest rated Syracuse commit since Carmelo Anthony in 2002.

College recruiting
Name	Hometown	School	Height	Weight	Commit date
Donnie Freeman; PF	Washington, D.C.	IMG Academy (FL)	6 ft 9 in (2.06 m)	200 lb (91 kg)	May 11, 2023
Donnie Freeman; PF	Recruit ratings: Rivals: 247Sports: On3: ESPN: (94)				
Overall recruit ranking: Rivals: 11 247Sports: 15 On3: 6 ESPN: 6
Note: In many cases, Scout, Rivals, 247Sports, On3, and ESPN may conflict in their listings of height and weight.; In these cases, the average was taken. ESPN grades are on a 100-point scale.; Sources: "Syracuse 2024 Basketball Commitments". Rivals.; "2024 Syracuse Orange Recruiting Class". ESPN.; "2024 Team Ranking". Rivals.

== College career ==
Freeman enrolled at Syracuse for the 2024–25 season and made an immediate impact as a freshman. He recorded a double-double in his college debut, finishing with 10 points and 11 rebounds against Le Moyne. Early in non-conference play, he continued to produce, including a 19-point, 12-rebound performance in a double-overtime win over Youngstown State. Freeman emerged as one of Syracuse's most productive players during the first half of the season. He recorded 23 points and 12 rebounds in a win over Cornell, leading the team to an 82–72 victory. He later set a career high with 24 points in a win over Albany, highlighting his scoring ability. Throughout non-conference and early ACC play, Freeman demonstrated versatility as a forward, contributing both as a scorer and rebounder while recording multiple double-doubles. On February 8, 2025, Freeman was ruled out for the remainder of the season after suffering a right leg injury in January. He appeared in 14 games (13 starts), averaging 13.4 points and 7.9 rebounds per game.

Freeman returned from injury for his sophomore season and assumed a larger role in Syracuse's offense. He opened the season with a 20-point performance in a win over Binghamton. Later in non-conference play, he scored 18 points and converted key free throws late in a 78–73 win over Monmouth. During ACC play, Freeman remained a consistent offensive contributor. He recorded 18 points in a 79–78 win over SMU, helping Syracuse secure a narrow victory. Over the course of the season, he posted multiple 20-point performances and regularly led the team in scoring and rebounding. Freeman appeared in 23 games (21 starts) and averaged 16.5 points and 7.2 rebounds per game, improving his efficiency and overall production from his freshman year. His play earned him honorable mention All-ACC recognition.

Following the 2025–26 season, Freeman entered the NCAA transfer portal and committed to St. John's. In July 2026, he suffered a torn Achilles, causing him to miss the season.

== National team career ==
On May 13, 2024, Freeman was selected to play for the Bahamas men's national basketball team in the Olympic qualifying tournament.

== Career statistics ==
Legend
GP	Games played	GS	Games started	MPG	Minutes per game
FG%	Field goal percentage	3P%	3-point field goal percentage	FT%	Free throw percentage
RPG	Rebounds per game	APG	Assists per game	SPG	Steals per game
BPG	Blocks per game	PPG	Points per game	**Bold**	Career high

=== College ===
Year	Team	GP	GS	MPG	FG%	3P%	FT%	RPG	APG	SPG	BPG	PPG
2024–25	Syracuse	14	13	25.5	**.504**	**.333**	**.796**	**7.9**	**1.4**	.4	.4	13.4
2025–26	Syracuse	**23**	**21**	**31.3**	.474	.302	.767	7.2	1.3	**.8**	**.9**	**16.5**
Career		37	34	29.1	.484	.311	.775	7.5	1.4	.6	.7	15.3
