= Bryson Tucker =

American basketball player (born 2006)

No. 00 – Rio Grande Valley Vipers
- Position: Small forward
- League: NBA G League

Personal information
- Born: July 5, 2006 (age 20) Bowie, Maryland, U.S.
- Listed height: 6 ft 7 in (2.01 m)
- Listed weight: 180 lb (82 kg)

Career information
- High school: Mount Saint Joseph (Baltimore, Maryland); IMG Academy (Bradenton, Florida); Bishop O'Connell (Arlington, Virginia)
- College: Indiana (2024–2025); Washington (2025–2026)
- NBA draft: 2026: undrafted
- Playing career: 2026–present

Career history
- 2026–present: Rio Grande Valley Vipers

Career highlights
- McDonald's All-American (2024)
Medals
Men's basketball
Representing United States
FIBA Americas Under-16 Championship
Gold medal – first place	2021 Mexico	Team

Bryson Tucker (born July 5, 2006) is an American professional basketball player for the Rio Grande Valley Vipers of the NBA G League. He played college basketball for the Indiana Hoosiers and Washington Huskies.

== Early life and high school ==
Tucker grew up in Bowie, Maryland and initially attended Mount Saint Joseph High School. He averaged 22.3 points, 5.2 rebounds, and 2.3 assists per game as a sophomore. Tucker transferred to IMG Academy in Bradenton, Florida before the start of his junior year. He left IMG midway through his junior season. Tucker transferred to Bishop O'Connell High School in Arlington, Virginia.

=== Recruiting ===
Tucker is a consensus five-star recruit and one of the top players in the 2024 class, according to major recruiting services. He committed to play college basketball at Indiana over offers from Duke, Michigan State, and Kansas. Tucker also considered playing professionally in the NBA G League for NBA G League Ignite before it was announced that the program would be discontinued.

== College career ==
Tucker averaged 5.4 points and 2.9 rebounds per game as a freshman at Indiana. Following the season he transferred to Washington. On November 9, 2025, Tucker sprained his ankle in a 78-69 loss at Baylor.

== National team career ==
Tucker played for the United States national under-16 team at the 2021 FIBA Under-16 Americas Championship. He averaged 9.5 points, 4.3 rebounds, and 1.2 steals per game as the United States won the gold medal.

== Professional career ==
Tucker was signed by the Rio Grande Valley Vipers on November 9, 2026.

== Personal life ==
Tucker's father Byron played collegiately for NC State and George Mason from 1988 to 1992.
