= Northwood High School (North Carolina) =

American public school in North Carolina

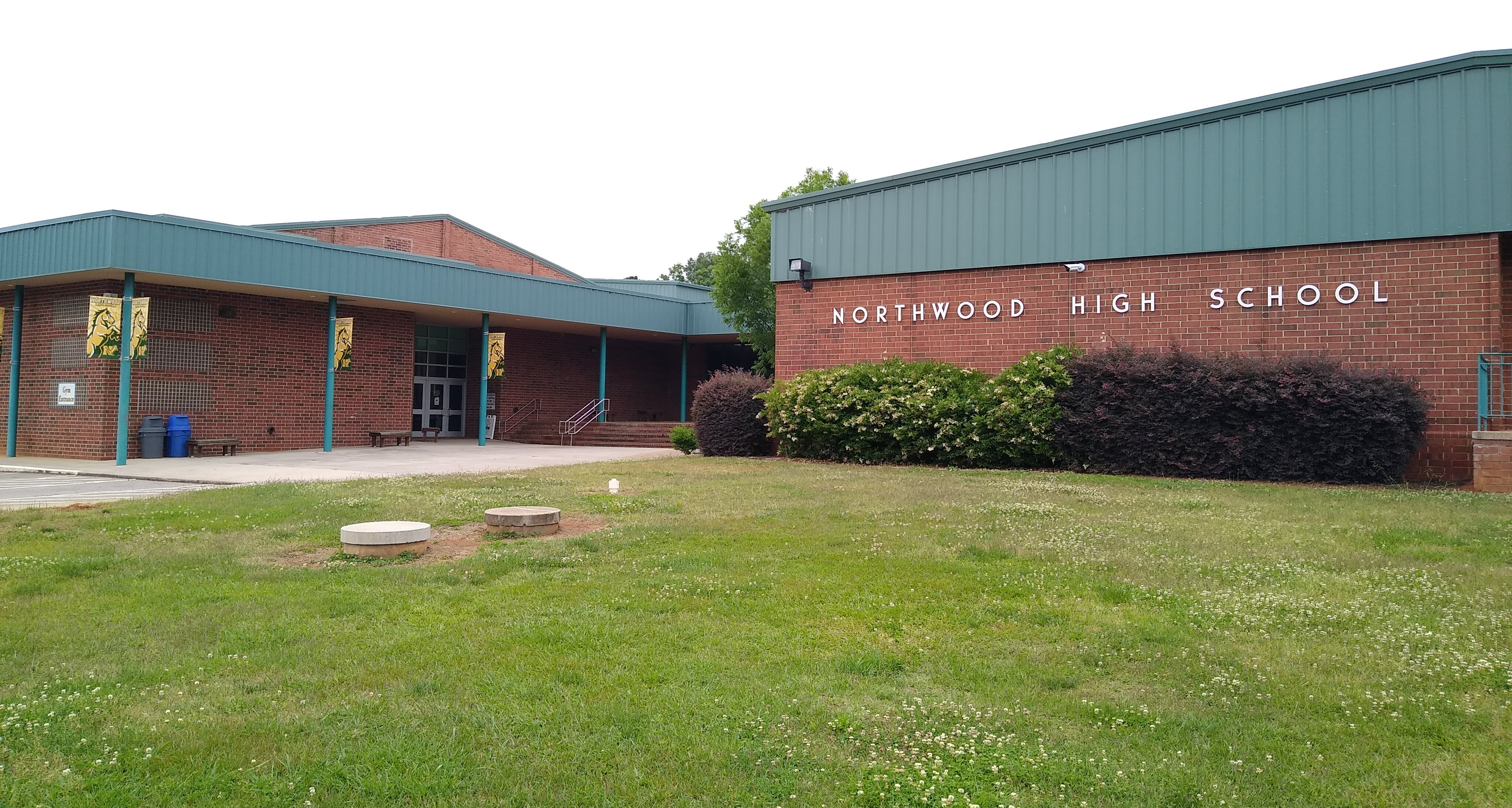
- Northwood High School

Location
- 310 Northwood High School Rd; Pittsboro, North Carolina 27312; United States; 35°44′39″N 79°10′09″W

Information
- Type: Public
- Established: 1972 (54 years ago)
- School board: Chatham County Schools
- CEEB code: 343135
- Principal: Wynne Youngblood
- Staff: 54.52 (FTE)
- Enrollment: 702 (2023-2024)
- Student to teacher ratio: 13:1
- Colors: Gold and green
- Mascot: Charger
- Website: www.chatham.k12.nc.us/o/nhs

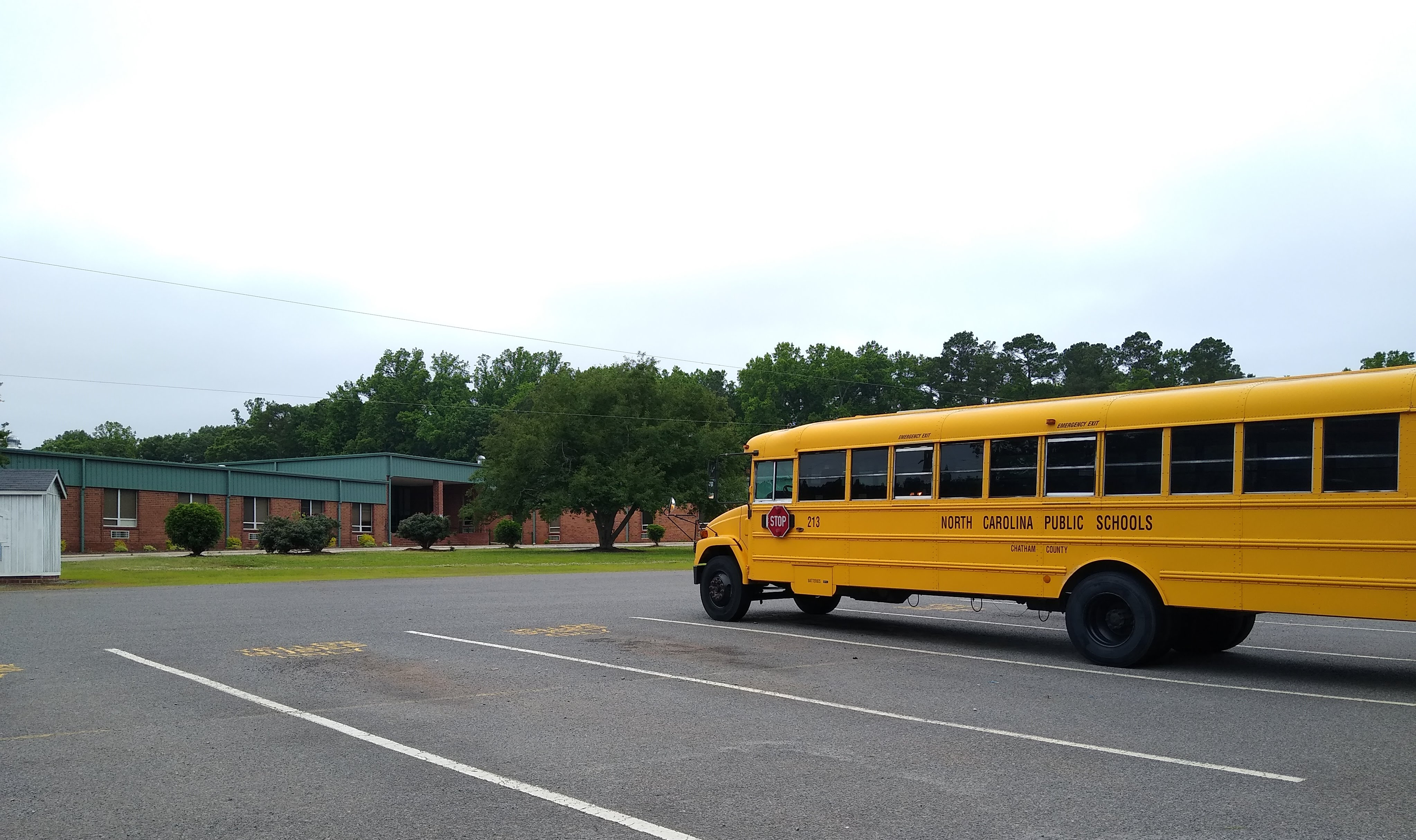
A school bus at Northwood High School

Northwood High School (NHS) is located in Pittsboro, Chatham County, North Carolina, United States. NHS is the second largest of four high schools in Chatham County and is operated by Chatham County Schools. The school's mascot is the Charger and the school colors are gold and green. During the 2023-2024 academic year, 702 students were enrolled. The school receives students primarily from the eastern and northeastern portions of the county.

Beginning in the 2021–2022 academic year, the newly built Seaforth High School opened approximately nine miles from Northwood High School to serve similar student populations and help relieve the demand on Northwood caused by the rapidly growing local population.

== History ==
Northwood High School first opened for the 1972-1973 school year to replace the older Pittsboro High School, whose building is now the headquarters of Chatham County Schools. The school was opened two years after school integration (schools were not fully integrated in Chatham County until 1970) as a way of consolidating black and white students into a larger facility than available at Pittsboro High School.

Northwood High School previously held their annual commencement ceremonies in the Dean Smith Center and Carmichael Arena, both on the campus of the nearby University of North Carolina at Chapel Hill. Since 2020, commencement ceremonies have been held in the school's gymnasium.

The building itself has changed little since its opening with the exception of a new math wing and the addition of modular classrooms. A green steel roof was added during the 2000-2001 school year. During the 2009-2010 school year the arts wing was remodeled and expanded and the gymnasium was renovated.

In response to the rapidly growing Chatham Park developments nearby, in 2019 a new road named Charger Boulevard was created providing an additional access to the school designed to reduce traffic congestion. Additionally, the previous entrance to the school on Northwood High School Road was also substantially reconfigured.

In 2024, a new $3,000,000 athletic facility was proposed featuring eight locker rooms, a weight room, and a sports medicine facility to serve the school's sports teams.

== Athletics ==
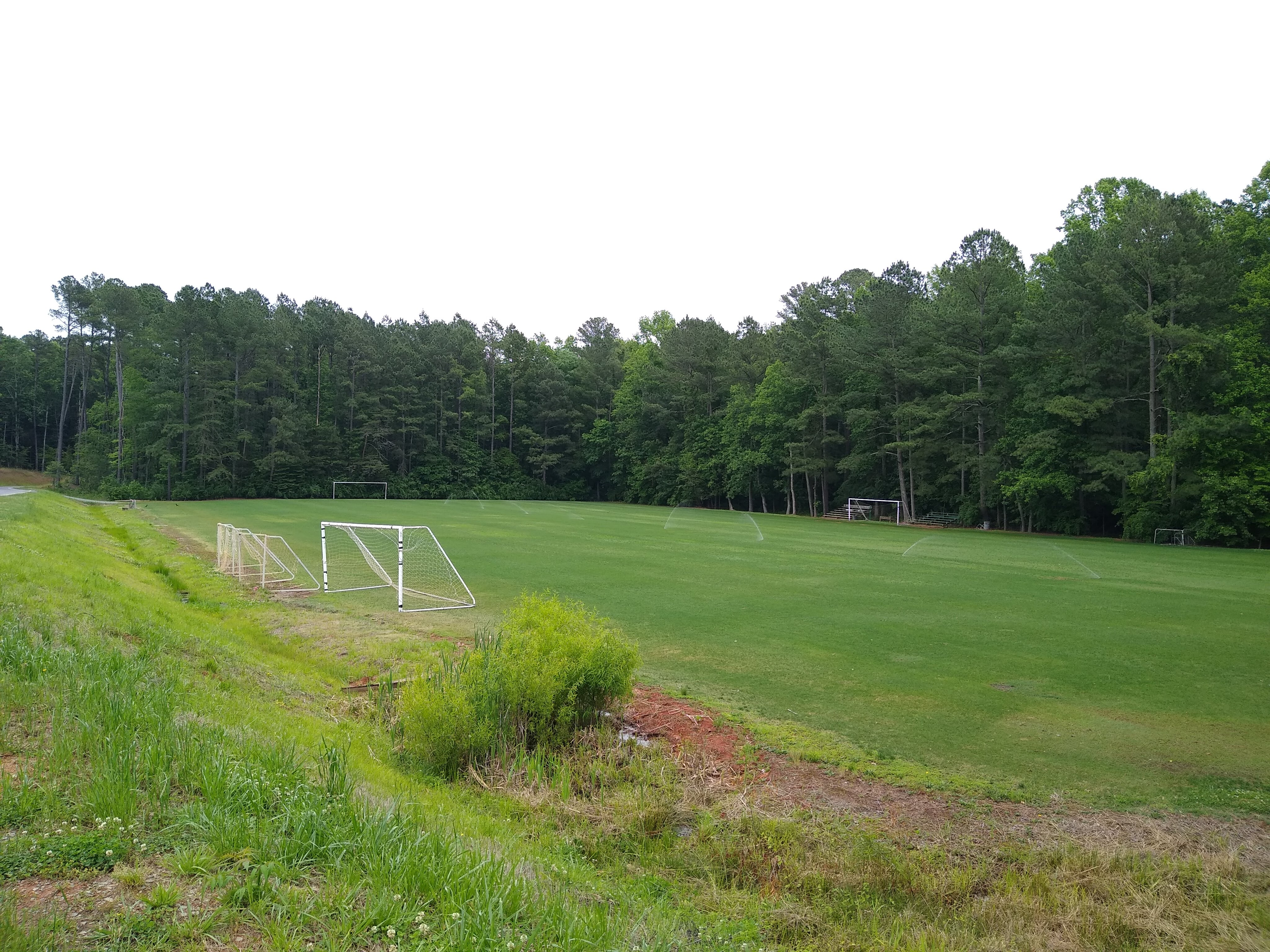
Northwood's lower practice field located in front of the school near Charger Blvd.

Northwood currently provides the following JV and Varsity sports:

Fall:

- Football
- Women's Volleyball
- Men's and Women's Cross-Country
- Men's Soccer
- Women's Tennis
- Women's Golf
- Cheerleading

Winter:

- Swimming
- Men's and Women's Basketball
- Men's and Women's Indoor Track
- Wrestling

Spring:

- Men's Golf
- Men's Tennis
- Club Lacrosse
- Women's Soccer
- Men's and Women's Track
- Baseball
- Softball
- Lacrosse

== Student Organizations ==
Northwood currently has around 48 student clubs and extracurricular activities, including FBLA, FCCLA, DECA, FFA, weight-lifting, and a Chess Club. Northwood's branch of FCCLA are renowned for their excellence in Parliamentary Procedure competitions. A team of eight females, all class of 2008 students, have won three state and national championships since 2004, traveling to San Diego, Nashville, and Anaheim. In 2009 the music department added a Tri-M honor society. Northwood fielded a Science Olympiad team in the spring of 2010 winning multiple 1st, 2nd, and 5th place medals at the Regional competition at UNC-Greensboro. In 2011, the Science Olympiad team won first place overall at Regionals that took place at Campbell University, advancing to the State competition level. In 2019, FBLA had eight members place in the top 4 at the state level and advance to the national competition in San Antonio.

== Marching Band ==
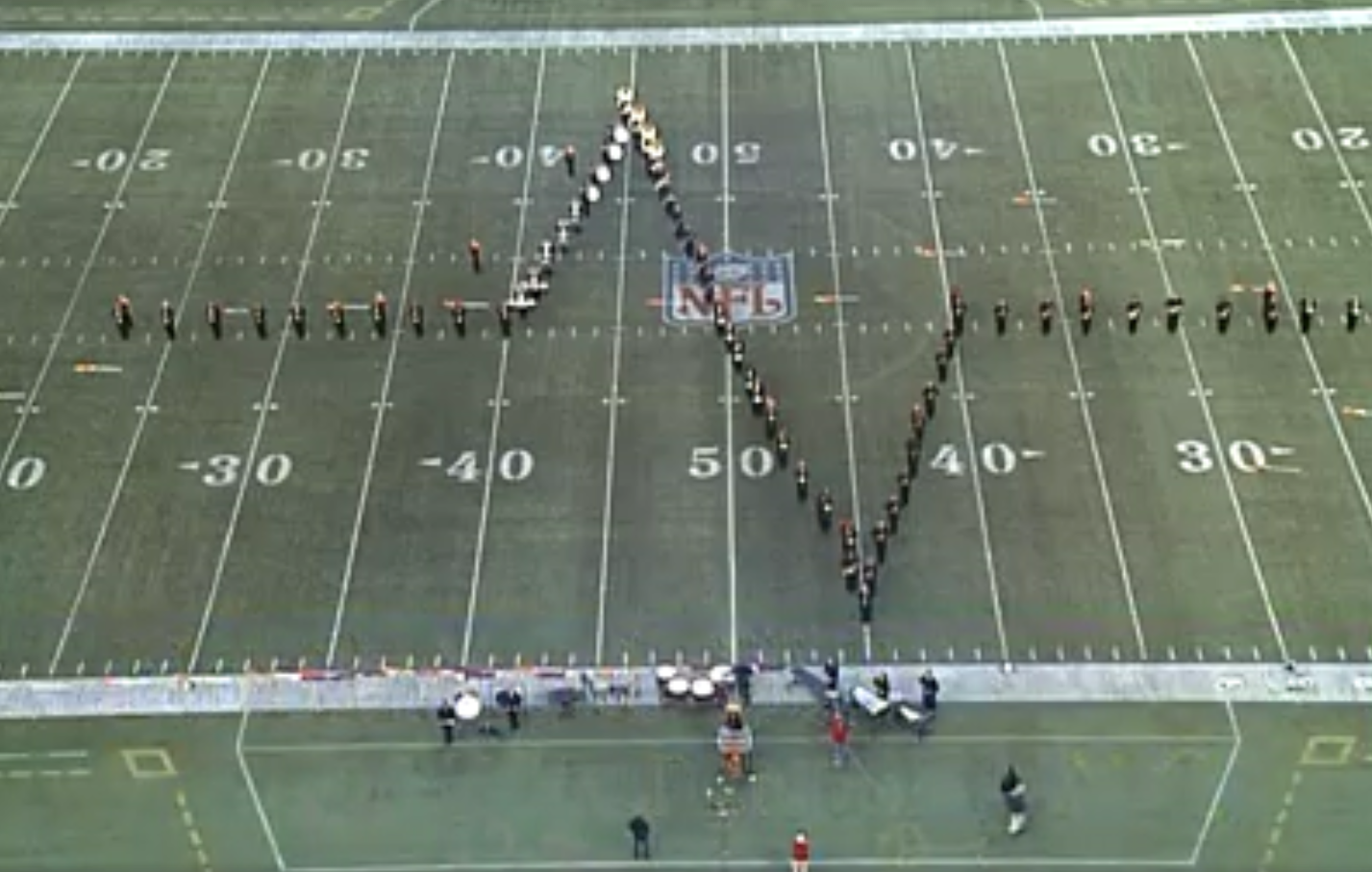
The Marching Chargers take the field to perform their show, Heartbeat, in the Yamaha Cup. Giants' Stadium, October 7, 2006.

Former director Eugene Cottrell led Northwood's marching band to its first ever all-superior season in 2002, an achievement repeated by the band numerous times under Cottrell's 15 years of leadership. In 2004 The Marching Charger Band received a grant from the Mr. Holland's Opus Foundation and was selected as an exemplary national model for band program development. On October 7, 2006, The Marching Chargers placed 2nd in class and 11th overall nationally in The Yamaha Cup, a marching band competition held at Giant's Stadium in East Rutherford, New Jersey. In 2014, Brett Cox was hired to be Cottrell's successor. During his tenure as band director, the marching band continued to win championships at distinguished regional competitions including Western Alamance, The Brick Capital Classic, Danville Dixie Classic, and Union Pines. In 2018, Jason Freeman took Brett Cox's place as head band director at Northwood High, followed by Hagan Zoellers beginning in the 2022–2023 school year.

== Notable people ==
=== Alumni ===
- Tobais Palmer (2008), former NFL wide receiver
- Austin Brice (2010), former MLB pitcher
- Aidan Laros (2021), NFL punter
- Jarin Stevenson (2023 - transferred), basketball player for the North Carolina Tar Heels
- Drake Powell (2024), basketball player for the Brooklyn Nets, drafted #22 in the first round of the 2025 NBA draft, formerly a player on the North Carolina Tar Heels

=== Faculty ===
- Tyler Zeller, eight-year NBA player, former ACC Player of the Year, assistant boys' basketball coach
