= 2025–26 Atlantic Coast Conference men's basketball season =

- League: NCAA Division I
- Sport: Basketball
- Duration: November 3, 2025 – March 7, 2026
- Teams: 18
- Total attendance: 2,743,863
- TV partner(s): ACC Network, ESPN, The CW Sports

NBA Draft
- Top draft pick: Cameron Boozer, Duke
- Picked by: Memphis Grizzlies, 3rd overall

2025–26 NCAA Division I men's basketball season
- Season champions: Duke
- Runners-up: Virginia
- Season MVP: Cameron Boozer – Duke
- Top scorer: Ebuka Okorie – 23.14 ppg

ACC tournament
- Champions: Duke
- Finals MVP: Cameron Boozer – Duke

Atlantic Coast Conference men's basketball seasons
- ← 2024–25 2026–27 →

2025–26 ACC men's basketball standings
	Conf.				Overall
Team	W		L	PCT	W		L	PCT
No. 4 Duke †	17	–	1	.944	35	–	3	.921
No. 17 Virginia	15	–	3	.833	30	–	6	.833
No. 24 Miami (FL)	13	–	5	.722	26	–	9	.743
North Carolina	12	–	6	.667	24	–	9	.727
Clemson	12	–	6	.667	24	–	11	.686
No. 23 Louisville	11	–	7	.611	24	–	11	.686
NC State	10	–	8	.556	20	–	14	.588
Florida State	10	–	8	.556	18	–	15	.545
California	9	–	9	.500	22	–	12	.647
Stanford	9	–	9	.500	20	–	13	.606
SMU	8	–	10	.444	20	–	14	.588
Virginia Tech	8	–	10	.444	19	–	13	.594
Wake Forest	7	–	11	.389	18	–	17	.514
Syracuse	6	–	12	.333	15	–	17	.469
Pittsburgh	5	–	13	.278	13	–	20	.394
Notre Dame	4	–	14	.222	13	–	18	.419
Boston College	4	–	14	.222	11	–	20	.355
Georgia Tech	2	–	16	.111	11	–	20	.355
† 2026 ACC tournament winner Rankings from AP Poll

The 2025–26 Atlantic Coast Conference men's basketball season began with practices in October 2025, followed by the start of the 2025–26 NCAA Division I men's basketball season in November. Conference play started in December 2025 and concluded in March 2026. The 2026 ACC men's basketball tournament was held at the Spectrum Center in Charlotte, North Carolina, in March 2025. This was the 72nd season of Atlantic Coast Conference basketball. The top 15 teams from regular season play earned postseason bids to the 2026 ACC men's basketball tournament. After scheduling 20 conference games per team from 2019–20 to 2024–25, the conference decided to return to 18-game conference schedules (the same as they had from 2012–13 to 2018–19).

The Duke Blue Devils finished as regular season champions with a 17–1 conference record. They finished two games ahead of Virginia, who finished with a 15–3 conference record. The title was Duke's twenty-second overall. Duke went on to win the ACC tournament over Virginia. It was their twenty-fourth tournament title, the most in conference history.

== Head coaches ==
=== Coaching changes ===
- After the 2024–25 season, Leonard Hamilton retired as head coach of Florida State. On March 9, the Seminoles announced the hiring of Luke Loucks as the new head coach.
- Jim Larrañaga stepped down from his head coaching role at Miami on December 26, 2024. Bill Courtney was the Hurricanes' interim coach for the remainder of the season. Courtney was not retained as the head coach, and Miami announced the hiring of Jai Lucas on March 6, 2025.
- NC State fired Kevin Keatts at the conclusion of the 2024–25 season. Will Wade was announced as his replacement on March 22, 2025.
- Tony Bennett announced his retirement as head coach of Virginia on October 17, 2024. Ron Sanchez was named interim head coach for the season, but was not retained for the 2025–26 season. Ryan Odom was announced as the new head coach on March 21, 2025.

=== Coaches ===
Team	Head coach	Previous job	Years at school	Record at school	ACC record	ACC titles	NCAA tournaments	NCAA Final Fours	NCAA Championships
Boston College	Earl Grant	Charleston	5	61–72	27–53	0	0	0	0
California	Mark Madsen	Utah Valley	3	27–38	6–14	0	0	0	0
Clemson	Brad Brownell	Wright State	16	292–196	146–128	0	5	0	0
Duke	Jon Scheyer	Duke (assoc.)	4	89–22	48–12	2	3	1	0
Florida State	Luke Loucks	Sacramento Kings (asst.)	1	0–0	0–0	0	0	0	0
Georgia Tech	Damon Stoudamire	Boston Celtics (asst.)	3	31–35	17–23	0	0	0	0
Louisville	Pat Kelsey	Charleston	2	27–8	18–2	0	1	0	0
Miami	Jai Lucas	Duke (assoc.)	1	0–0	0–0	0	0	0	0
NC State	Will Wade	McNeese	1	0–0	0–0	0	0	0	0
North Carolina	Hubert Davis	North Carolina (asst.)	5	101–45	56–24	0	3	1	0
Notre Dame	Micah Shrewsberry	Penn State	3	28–38	8–25	0	0	0	0
Pittsburgh	Jeff Capel	Duke (asst.)	8	114–107	55–79	0	1	0	0
SMU	Andy Enfield	USC	2	24–11	13–7	0	0	0	0
Stanford	Kyle Smith	Washington State	2	21–14	11–9	0	0	0	0
Syracuse	Adrian Autry	Syracuse (assoc.)	3	34–31	18–22	0	0	0	0
Virginia	Ryan Odom	VCU	1	0–0	0–0	0	0	0	0
Virginia Tech	Mike Young	Wofford	7	105–85	53–60	1	2	0	0
Wake Forest	Steve Forbes	East Tennessee State	6	92–65	50–48	0	0	0	0

Notes:

- Year at school includes 2025–26 season.
- Overall and ACC records are from the time at current school and are through the end of the 2024–25 season.
- NCAA tournament appearances are from the time at current school only.
- NCAA Final Fours and championship include time at other schools.

== Preseason ==
=== Recruiting classes ===
Rankings
Team	247 Sports	On3Recruits	ESPN	Commits
Boston College	68	51	NR	4
California	87	54	NR	2
Clemson	37	40	NR	4
Duke	1	1	1	5
Florida State	83	98	NR	4
Georgia Tech	31	29	17	5
Louisville	25	39	NR	4
Miami	16	21	23	7
NC State	50	13	NR	3
North Carolina	5	15	25	4
Notre Dame	13	11	9	4
Pittsburgh	62	60	NR	4
SMU	6	9	10	5
Stanford	32	91	NR	4
Syracuse	17	16	14	5
Virginia	26	46	NR	4
Virginia Tech	39	84	NR	5
Wake Forest	87	66	NR	2

Notes:

- Rankings are up to date as of September 17, 2025.

=== Preseason watchlists ===
	Wooden Award	Naismith	Cousy	West	Erving	Malone	Abdul-Jabbar
Mikel Brown Jr.	✓	✓	✓				
Cameron Boozer	✓	✓				✓	
Markus Burton	✓	✓	✓				
Ryan Conwell	✓	✓		✓			
Isaiah Evans		✓		✓			
Donnie Freeman						✓	
Baye Ndongo						✓	
Patrick Ngongba II							✓
Malik Reneau						✓	
Dame Sarr					✓		
Malik Thomas				✓			
Seth Trimble				✓			
Ernest Udeh Jr.							✓
Henri Veesaar							✓
Darrion Williams	✓	✓			✓		
Caleb Wilson	✓	✓				✓	

=== Preseason polls ===
	AP	Blue Ribbon; Yearbook	CBS Sports	Coaches	ESPN	Fox Sports	KenPom	NCAA Sports	Sporting News	Sports; Illustrated
Boston College	–	–	–	–	–	–	90	–	–	146
California	–	–	–	–	–	–	87	–	–	119
Clemson	–	–	48	–	–	–	32	RV	–	52
Duke	6	4	5	5	12	9	7	7	1	4
Florida State	–	–	94	–	–	–	96	–	–	87
Georgia Tech	–	–	85	–	–	–	70	RV	–	102
Louisville	11	10	12	9	7	7	14	11	17	8
Miami	–	–	70	–	–	–	76	RV	–	50
North Carolina	25	25	24	25	25	–	33	23	–	21
NC State	RV	–	35	RV	24	–	38	22	–	33
Notre Dame	–	–	55	–	–	–	77	–	–	76
Pittsburgh	–	–	67	–	–	–	63	–	–	83
SMU	–	–	41	–	–	–	43	–	–	44
Stanford	–	–	82	–	–	–	89	–	–	107
Syracuse	–	–	79	–	–	–	68	–	–	72
Virginia	RV	–	29	RV	–	–	59	–	–	20
Virginia Tech	–	–	66	–	–	–	71	–	–	56
Wake Forest	–	–	63	–	–	–	49	–	–	62

==== ACC Preseason Media poll ====
The preseason poll and Preseason All-ACC Teams were released on October 14, 2025, prior to the season beginning and after ACC Media Day. The results of the poll are below.

===== Preseason poll =====
	ACC Media	Points
1.	Duke	866 (34)
2.	Louisville	842 (15)
3.	North Carolina	741
4.	NC State	710
5.	Virginia	623
6.	SMU	616
7.	Clemson	510
8.	Miami	500
9.	Syracuse	489
10.	Notre Dame	477
11.	Wake Forest	412
12.	Virginia Tech	355
13.	Georgia Tech	315
14.	Pittsburgh	301
15.	Florida State	221
16.	California	156
17.	Stanford	138
18.	Boston College	107
Reference: (#) first-place votes

===== Preseason All-ACC teams =====
2025 ACC Men's Basketball Preseason All-ACC Teams
First Team	Second Team
Cameron Boozer – Duke	Isaiah Evans – Duke
Markus Burton – Notre Dame	Boopie Miller – SMU
Darrion Williams – NC State	JJ Starling – Syracuse
Mikel Brown Jr. – Louisville	Baye Ndongo – Georgia Tech
Ryan Conwell – Louisville	Caleb Wilson – North Carolina

===== ACC preseason player of the year =====
- Darrion Williams - NC State - 23
- Cameron Boozer – Duke – 19
- Markus Burton – Notre Dame – 2
- JJ Starling – Syracuse – 2
- Donald Hand Jr. – Boston College – 1
- Baye Ndongo – Georgia Tech – 1
- Caleb Wilson – North Carolina – 1

===== ACC preseason freshman of the year =====
- Cameron Boozer – Duke – 43
- Mikel Brown Jr. – Louisville – 3
- Caleb Wilson – North Carolina – 2
- Neoklis Avdalas – Virginia Tech – 1

=== Early season tournaments ===
Team	Tournament	Finish
Boston College	Charleston Classic – Lowcounty Bracket	4th
California	Empire Classic	Champions
Clemson	Charleston Classic – Palmetto Bracket	Champions
Duke	Champions Classic	Won vs. Kansas
Florida State	None	
Georgia Tech	Emerald Coast Classic	4th
Louisville	None	
Miami	ESPN Events Invitational – Magic Bracket	3rd
North Carolina	Fort Myers Tip-Off – Beach Division	2nd
NC State	Maui Invitational	6th
Notre Dame	Players Era Festival	4th
Pittsburgh	Legends Classic	4th
SMU	None	
Stanford	Acrisure Invitational	Champions
Syracuse	Players Era Festival	8th
Virginia	Greenbrier Tip-Off – Mountain Division	4th
Virginia Tech	Battle 4 Atlantis	4th
Wake Forest	Bahamas Championship	3rd

== Regular season ==
=== Rankings ===
Legend
	Increase in ranking
	Decrease in ranking
	Not ranked previous week
	First place votes shown in ()
т	Tied

		Pre	Wk 2	Wk 3	Wk 4	Wk 5	Wk 6	Wk 7	Wk 8	Wk 9	Wk 10	Wk 11	Wk 12	Wk 13	Wk 14	Wk 15	Wk 16	Wk 17	Wk 18	Wk 19	Wk 20	Final
Boston College	AP									N/A												
Boston College	C																					
California	AP							RV	RV	N/A	RV											
California	C						RV		RV	RV	RV											
Clemson	AP				RV	RV	RV	RV	RV	N/A	RV	22	18	22	20	20	RV		RV		RV	
Clemson	C		RV		RV	RV	RV	RV	RV	RV	RV	21	18	19	19	18	24	RV	RV			
Duke	AP	6	4 (2)	5 (1)	4	4	3 (7)	3 (3)	6	N/A	6	6	5	4	4	4	3	1 (56)	1 (55)	1 (56)	1 (50)	4
Duke	C	5	4 (1)	4 (2)	4 (1)	4 (1)	3 (2)	3 (3)	6	5	6	6	5	4	4	6	3	1 (27)	1 (28)	1 (28)	1 (26)	4
Florida State	AP									N/A												
Florida State	C																					
Georgia Tech	AP									N/A												
Georgia Tech	C																					
Louisville	AP	11	12	6	6	6	11	11	16	N/A	20	20	23	20	24	24	21	24	RV	24	23т	23
Louisville	C	10	12	6т	5	6	11	11	14	13т	18	19	21	20	23	23	21	20	RV	24	24	23
Miami	AP						RV	RV	RV	N/A	RV	RV	RV		RV		RV	RV	22	RV	25	24
Miami	C						RV					RV	RV				RV	RV	23	25	23	22
North Carolina	AP	25	18	18	16	16	14	12	12	N/A	17	14	22	16	14	11	16	18	17	19	21	RV
North Carolina	C	25	20	19	17	17	15	13	12	12	17	15	24	18	18	13	20	19	18	19	21	RV
NC State	AP	RV	RV	25	23	RV			RV	N/A		RV	RV	RV	RV	RV		RV	RV			
NC State	C	RV	RV	RV	22	RV		RV							RV	RV						
Notre Dame	AP						RV	RV		N/A												
Notre Dame	C																					
Pittsburgh	AP									N/A												
Pittsburgh	C																					
SMU	AP					RV	RV			N/A	24	RV	RV	RV				RV				
SMU	C					RV	RV	RV			25	RV	RV	RV								
Stanford	AP		RV	RV						N/A												
Stanford	C																					
Syracuse	AP									N/A												
Syracuse	C																					
Virginia	AP	RV		RV			24	23т	21	N/A	23	16	14	17	18	15	14	11	13	10	9	17
Virginia	C	RV	RV	RV	RV	RV	25	22	21	21	23	16	15	17	17	15	14	12	13	11	8	15
Virginia Tech	AP		RV	RV	RV					N/A	RV											
Virginia Tech	C							RV														
Wake Forest	AP					RV				N/A												
Wake Forest	C																					

=== Conference matrix ===
This table summarizes the head-to-head results between teams in conference play.

	Boston College	California	Clemson	Duke	Florida State	Georgia Tech	Louisville	Miami	North Carolina	NC State	Notre Dame	Pittsburgh	SMU	Stanford	Syracuse	Virginia	Virginia Tech	Wake Forest
vs. Boston College	–	86–75	74–50	67–49	80–72	65–53	75–62	74–68; 76–54	×	79–71	68–64; 69–77	62–65	94–70	70–64	73–81^{OT}	73–66	72–63	67–68
vs. California	75–86	–	77–55	71–56	63–61	85–90; 65–76	90–70	85–86	78–84	×	71–72	72–56	69–73	66–78; 66–72	107–100^{2OT}	84–60	78–75	80–73
vs. Clemson	50–74	55–77	–	67–54	70–65	63–77; 76–79	75–80	59–69	67–63	80–76^{OT}	61–76	68–73; 52–63	70–74	64–66	61–64	×	76–66	85–77
vs. Duke	49–67	56–71	54–67	–	87–91	79–85	73–84; 52–83	×	71–68; 61–76	64–93	56–100	54–70	75–82	50–80	64–101	51–77	58–72	69–90
vs. Florida State	72–80	61–63	65–70	91–87	–	71–80	×	63–65; 83–73	79–66	113–69	79–82	74–75	83–80; 78–91	80–88	94–86	61–58	69–92	69–68
vs. Georgia Tech	53–65	90–85; 76–65	77–63; 79–76	85–79	80–71	–	87–70	91–81	91–75	74–78	89–74	89–66	×	95–72	82–72	94–68	71–65	83–67
vs. Louisville	62–75	70–90	80–75	84–73; 83–52	×	70–87	–	89–92	77–74	77–118	65–76	59–100	74–88; 95–85	80–76	62–77	79–70	71–85	80–88
vs. Miami	68–74; 54–76	86–85	69–59	×	65–63; 73–83	81–91	92–89	–	66–75	76–77	69–81	69–76	69–77	70–79	76–85	86–83	66–67	77–81
vs. North Carolina	×	84–78	63–67	68–71; 76–61	66–79	75–91	74–77	75–66	–	82–58	69–91	65–79	97–83	95–90	77–87; 64–77	80–85	82–89	84–87
vs. NC State	71–79	×	76–80^{OT}	93–64	69–113	78–74	118–77	77–76	58–82	–	96–90^{OT}	72–81	83–84	85–84	68–88	76–61; 90–61	73–82	57–70; 78–96
vs. Notre Dame	64–68; 77–69	72–71	76–61	100–56	82–79	74–89	76–65	81–69	91–69	90–96^{OT}	–	73–68	89–81	40–47; 86–78	86–72	100–97^{2OT}	89–76	×
vs. Pittsburgh	65–62	56–72	73–68; 63–52	70–54	75–74	66–89	100–59	76–69	79–65	81–72	68–73	–	86–67	75–67	83–72; 69–71^{OT}	67–47	×	76–80^{OT}
vs. SMU	70–94	73–69	74–70	82–75	80–83; 91–78	×	88–74; 85–95	77–69	83–97	84–83	81–89	67–86	–	95–75	79–78	72–68	76–77	79–91
vs. Stanford	64–70	78–66; 72–66	66–64	80–50	88–80	72–95	76–80	79–70	90–95	84–85	47–40; 78–86	67–75	75–95	–	×	70–55	68–69	68–63
vs. Syracuse	81–73^{OT}	100–107^{2OT}	64–61	101–64	86–94	72–82	77–62	85–76	87–77; 77–64	88–68	72–82	72–83; 71–69^{OT}	78–79	×	–	72–59	76–74	88–83
vs. Virginia	66–73	60–84	×	77–51	58–61	68–94	70–79	83–86	85–80	61–76; 61–90	97–100^{2OT}	47–67	68–72	55–70	59–72	–	95–85^{3OT}; 72–76	70–75
vs. Virginia Tech	63–72	75–78	66–76	72–58	92–69	65–71	85–71	67–66	89–82	82–73	76–89	×	77–76	69–68	74–76	85–95^{3OT}; 76–72	–	81–78; 63–82
vs. Wake Forest	68–67	73–80	77–85	90–69	68–68	67–83	88–80	81–77	87–84	70–57; 96–78	×	80–76^{OT}	91–79	63–68	83–88	75–70	78–81; 82–63	–
Total	4–14	9–9	12–6	17–1	10–8	2–16	11–7	13–5	12–6	10–8	4–14	5–13	8–10	9–9	6–12	15–3	8–10	7–11

× – Matchup not played in 2025–26
Updated after the season.

=== Player of the week ===
Throughout the conference regular season, the Atlantic Coast Conference offices named Player(s) of the week and Rookie(s) of the week.

Week	Date awarded	Player of the week	Rookie of the week	Reference
Week 1	November 10, 2025	Caleb Wilson – North Carolina; Neoklis Avdalas – Virginia Tech		
Week 2	November 17, 2025	Cameron Boozer – Duke; Mikel Brown Jr. – Louisville		
Week 3	November 24, 2025	BJ Edwards – SMU	Cameron Boozer (2) – Duke	
Week 4	December 1, 2025	Cameron Boozer (2) – Duke	Cameron Boozer (3) – Duke	
Week 5	December 8, 2025	Cameron Boozer (3) – Duke	Cameron Boozer (4) – Duke	
Week 6	December 15, 2025	Myles Colvin – Wake Forest	Neoklis Avdalas (2) – Virginia Tech	
Week 7	December 22, 2025	Paul McNeil – NC State	Caleb Wilson (2) – North Carolina	
Week 8	December 29, 2025	BJ Edwards (2) – SMU	Ebuka Okorie – Stanford	
Week 9	January 5, 2026	Boopie Miller – SMU	Cameron Boozer (5) – Duke	
Week 10	January 12, 2026	Tre Donaldson – Miami	Cameron Boozer (6) – Duke	
Week 11	January 19, 2026	Cameron Boozer (4) – Duke	Cameron Boozer (7) – Duke	
Week 12	January 26, 2026	BJ Edwards (3) – SMU	Cameron Boozer (8) – Duke	
Week 13	February 2, 2026	Thijs De Ridder – Virginia		
Week 14	February 9, 2026	Quadir Copeland – NC State	Caleb Wilson (3) – North Carolina	
Week 14	February 9, 2026	Quadir Copeland – NC State	Ebuka Okorie (2) – Stanford	
Week 15	February 16, 2026	Mikel Brown Jr. (2) – Louisville		
Week 16	February 23, 2026	Robert McCray V – Florida State	Cameron Boozer (9) – Duke	
Week 17	March 2, 2026	Seth Trimble – North Carolina	Ebuka Okorie (3) – Stanford	
Week 18	March 9, 2026	Cameron Boozer (5) – Duke	Cameron Boozer (10) – Duke	
Week 18	March 9, 2026	Ebuka Okorie – Stanford	Ebuka Okorie (4) – Stanford	

=== Records against other conferences ===
2025–26 records against non-conference foes. Records shown for regular season only.
Updated through games played on February 21, 2026.

Power 4 Conferences & Gonzaga	Record
Big East	4–4
Big Ten	12–5
Big 12	10–14
SEC	15–17
Gonzaga	0–0
Power 4 Total	41–39
Other NCAA Division I conferences	Record
America East	7–0
American	6–2
A-10	7–3
ASUN	12–0
Big Sky	6–0
Big South	9–0
Big West	4–0
CAA	10–2
C-USA	2–0
Horizon League	3–1
Ivy League	2–0
MAAC	3–1
MAC	3–2
MEAC	11–0
MVC	3–1
Mountain West	3–1
NEC	6–1
OVC	4–0
Patriot League	6–0
SoCon	6–0
Southland	3–0
SWAC	9–0
The Summit	0–0
Sun Belt	7–0
WAC	3–0
WCC (not including Gonzaga)	2–2
Other Division I Total	137–16
NCAA Division I Total	178–55
NCAA Division II Total	1–0

== Postseason ==
=== ACC tournament ===
- The 2026 Atlantic Coast Conference Basketball Tournament will be held at the Spectrum Center in Charlotte, North Carolina, from March 10–14, 2026.

First round Tuesday, March 10
12	Virginia Tech	89
13	Wake Forest	95*
10	Stanford	63
15	Pittsburgh	64
11	SMU	86
14	Syracuse	69

Second round Wednesday, March 11
8	Florida State	95
9	California	89
5	Clemson	71
13	Wake Forest	62
7	NC State	98
15	Pittsburgh	88
6	Louisville	62
11	SMU	58

Quarterfinals; Thursday, March 12
1	Duke	80
8	Florida State	79
4	North Carolina	79
5	Clemson	80
2	Virginia	81
7	NC State	74
3	Miami	78
6	Louisville	73

Semifinals; Friday, March 13
1	Duke	73
5	Clemson	61
2	Virginia	84
3	Miami	62

Championship; Saturday, March 14
1	Duke	74
2	Virginia	70

=== NCAA tournament ===
Seed	Region	School	First Four	First round	Second round	Sweet 16	Elite Eight	Final Four	Championship
1	East	Duke	Bye	W 71–65 vs. (16) Siena	W 81–58 vs. (9) TCU	W 80–75 vs. (5) St. John's	L 72–73 vs. (2) UConn	DNP	
3	Midwest	Virginia	Bye	W 82–73 vs. (14) Wright State	L 72–79 vs. (6) Tennessee	DNP			
6	East	Louisville	Bye	W 83–79 vs. (11) South Florida	L 69–77 vs. (3) Michigan State	DNP			
6	South	North Carolina	Bye	L 78–82 ^{(OT)} vs. (11) VCU	DNP				
7	West	Miami (FL)	Bye	W 80–66 vs. (10) Missouri	L 69–79 vs. (2) Purdue	DNP			
8	South	Clemson	Bye	L 61–67 vs. (9) Iowa	DNP				
11	West	NC State	L 66–68 vs. (11) Texas	DNP					
11	Midwest	SMU	L 79–89 vs. (11) Miami (OH)	DNP					
		W–L (%):	0–2 (.000)	4–2 (.667)	1–3 (.250)	1–0 (1.000)	0–1 (.000)	0–0 (–)	0–0 (–)
Total: 6–8 (.429)

=== National Invitation tournament ===
Seed	Bracket	School	1st round	2nd round	Quarterfinals	Semifinals	Championship
1	Winston-Salem	Wake Forest	W 82–72 vs. Navy	L 75–78 vs. (4) Illinois State	DNP		
2	Alberquerque	California	W 91–73 vs. UIC	L 75–76 vs. Saint Joseph's	DNP		
		W–L (%):	2–0 (1.000)	0–2 (.000)	0–0 (–)	0–0 (–)	0–0 (–)
Total: 2–2 (.500)

=== CBC ===
School	Quarterfinals	Semifinals	Final
Stanford	L 77–82^{(OT)} vs. West Virginia	DNP	
W-L (%):	0–1 (.000)	–	–
Total: 0–1 (.000)

== Honors and awards ==
=== All-Americans ===
Consensus All-Americans
First team	Second team
Cameron Boozer	Caleb Wilson

To earn "consensus" status, a player must win honors based on a point system computed from the four different all-America teams. The point system consists of three points for first team, two points for second team and one point for third team. No honorable mention or fourth team or lower are used in the computation. The top five totals plus ties are first team and the next five plus ties are second team.

Associated Press	NABC	Sporting News	USBWA
First team
Cameron Boozer	Cameron Boozer	Cameron Boozer	Cameron Boozer
Second team
Caleb Wilson			Caleb Wilson
Third team
	Caleb Wilson	Caleb Wilson	

=== ACC Awards ===
2025-26 ACC men's basketball individual awards
Award	Recipient(s)
Player of the Year	Cameron Boozer – Duke
Coach of the Year	Jon Scheyer – Duke
Defensive Player of the Year	Maliq Brown – Duke
Rookie of the Year	Cameron Boozer – Duke
Most Improved Player of the Year	Juke Harris – Wake Forest
Sixth Man Award	Maliq Brown – Duke

2025-26 ACC Men's Basketball All-Conference teams
First team	Second team	Third team	Honorable mention
Cameron Boozer – Duke; Caleb Wilson – North Carolina; Ebuka Okorie – Stanford; Malik Reneau – Miami; Thijs De Ridder – Virginia	Boopie Miller – SMU; Juke Harris – Wake Forest; Henri Veesaar – North Carolina; Tre Donaldson – Miami; Ryan Conwell – Louisville	Isaiah Evans – Duke; Mikel Brown Jr. – Louisville; Quadir Copeland – NC State; Robert McCray V – Florida State; Dai Dai Ames – California	Jaron Pierre Jr. – SMU; Donnie Freeman – Syracuse; RJ Godfrey – Clemson; Amani Hansberry – Virginia Tech; Seth Trimble – North Carolina; Patrick Ngongba II – Duke; Justin Pippen – California; Darrion Williams – NC State; Jalen Haralson – Notre Dame; B.J. Edwards – SMU

2025-26 ACC Men's Basketball All-Defensive Team
Player	Team	Votes
Maliq Brown	Duke	63
Ugonna Onyenso	Virginia	58
B.J. Edwards	SMU	55
Dame Sarr	Duke	48
Ernest Udeh Jr.	Miami	40

2025-26 ACC Men's Basketball All-Freshman Team
Player	Team	Votes
Cameron Boozer	Duke	84
Caleb Wilson	North Carolina	84
Ebuka Okorie	Stanford	82
Mikel Brown Jr.	Louisville	64
Thijs De Ridder	Virginia	62

== NBA draft ==
PG	Point guard	SG	Shooting guard	SF	Small forward	PF	Power forward	C	Center

Player	Team	Round	Pick #	Position	School
(United States) Cameron Boozer	Memphis Grizzlies	1	3	PF	Duke
(United States) Caleb Wilson	Chicago Bulls	1	4	PF	North Carolina
(United States) Mikel Brown Jr.	Brooklyn Nets	1	6	PG	Louisville
(United States) Ebuka Okorie	Oklahoma City Thunder	1	17	PG	Stanford
(United States) Isaiah Evans	Brooklyn Nets	2	33	SF	Duke
(United States) Ryan Conwell	Oklahoma City Thunder	2	37	SG	Louisville
(United States) Maliq Brown	San Antonio Spurs	2	44	PF	Duke
(United Kingdom) Tobi Lawal	Dallas Mavericks	2	48	PF	Virginia Tech
(Estonia) Henri Veesaar	Atlanta Hawks	2	52	C	North Carolina
(Nigeria) Ugonna Onyenso	Houston Rockets	2	53	C	Virginia
(United States) Lajae Jones	Golden State Warriors	2	54	SG	Florida State
(United States) Jaron Pierre Jr.	New Orleans Pelicans	2	58	SG	SMU

== Attendance ==
Team	Arena	Capacity	Game 1	Game 2	Game 3	Game 4	Game 5	Game 6	Game 7	Game 8	Game 9	Game 10	Total	Average	% of capacity
Team	Arena	Capacity	Game 11	Game 12	Game 13	Game 14	Game 15	Game 16	Game 17	Game 18	Game 19	Game 20	Total	Average	% of capacity
Boston College	Conte Forum	8,606	2,538	3,774	3,751	4,439	4,060	4,064	2,833	4,768	1,892	8,606	70,067	4,122	47.89%
Boston College	Conte Forum	8,606	3,233	6,248	6,133	2,403	3,485	2,811	5,029				70,067	4,122	47.89%
California	Haas Pavilion	11,858	3,143	2,172	2,377	1,894	4,295	2,783	2,688	1,844	2,738	1,894	89,698	4,485	37.82%
California	Haas Pavilion	11,858	3,283	6,012	5,158	11,201	8,077	6,018	5,629	9,020	4,411	5,061	89,698	4,485	37.82%
Clemson	Littlejohn Coliseum	9,000	7,439	7,217	6,357	6,356	6,118	6,129	9,000	8,134	7,320	9,000	119,487	7,468	82.98%
Clemson	Littlejohn Coliseum	9,000	9,000	6,723	7,392	8,241	8,084	6,977					119,487	7,468	82.98%
Duke	Cameron Indoor Stadium	9,314	9,314	9,314	9,314	9,314	9,314	9,314	9,314	9,314	9,314	9,314	139,710	9,314	100%
Duke	Cameron Indoor Stadium	9,314	9,314	9,314	9,314	9,314	9,314						139,710	9,314	100%
Florida State	Donald L. Tucker Center	11,675	5,397	6,137	4,367	3,977	3,567	6,677	3,692	4,077	6,097	6,917	97,154	5,409	48.95%
Florida State	Donald L. Tucker Center	11,675	6,047	4,867	6,307	7,377	4,577	10,317	6,757				97,154	5,409	48.95%
Georgia Tech	McCamish Pavilion	8,600	3,551	4,886	4,585	5,128	4,772	4,859	4,595	5,674	4,987	5,967	102,780	5,409	62.90%
Georgia Tech	McCamish Pavilion	8,600	5,978	6,216	5,269	6,781	8,700	4,879	5,056	6,773	4,124		102,780	5,409	62.90%
Louisville	KFC Yum! Center	22,090	14,218	14,412	22,586	14,899	13,832	13,825	16,355	14,076	17,656	14,585	261,727	15,396	69.70%
Louisville	KFC Yum! Center	22,090	14,697	14,907	14,847	14,787	14,389	16,350	15,306				261,727	15,396	69.70%
Miami	Watsco Center	7,972	5,633	4,508	4,105	4,131	4,126	3,907	3,751	4,930	3,862	4,832	95,283	5,294	66.40%
Miami	Watsco Center	7,972	5,328	5,664	4,987	6,513	7,355	7,639	6,040	7,972			95,283	5,294	66.40%
North Carolina	Dean Smith Center	21,750	16,079	21,750	16,613	17,522	16,869	18,583	17,759	16,548	20,479	20,618	350,988	19,499	89.65%
North Carolina	Dean Smith Center	21,750	21,750	19,686	20,152	21,750	21,750	20,577	21,750	20,753			350,988	19,499	89.65%
NC State	Lenovo Center; Reynolds Coliseum	19,119 (Lenovo); 5,500 (Reynolds)	19,119	15,918	14,516	14,805	14,862	14,515	19,119	5,500	16,105	16,144	277,802	16,341	82.86%
NC State	Lenovo Center; Reynolds Coliseum	19,119 (Lenovo); 5,500 (Reynolds)	16,378	15,636	19,119	18,410	19,367	19,367	18,922				277,802	16,341	82.86%
Notre Dame	Edmund P. Joyce Center	9,149	3,911	7,608	3,618	3,676	4,980	3,687	4,323	5,366	6,933	5,278	90,213	5,307	58.00%
Notre Dame	Edmund P. Joyce Center	9,149	5,248	4,012	6,170	5,906	9,149	6,466	3,902				90,213	5,307	58.00%
Pittsburgh	Petersen Events Center	12,508	5,050	5,134	4,572	4,674	4,721	6,299	4,945	4,660	4,687	6,652	103,363	5,742	45.91%
Pittsburgh	Petersen Events Center	12,508	6,358	6,070	5,572	4,970	6,680	10,804	6,406	5,109			103,363	5,742	45.91%
SMU	Moody Coliseum	7,000	4,626	4,222	4,348	5,383	4,347	4,502	4,421	4,634	4,584	6,698	97,441	5,413	77.33%
SMU	Moody Coliseum	7,000	5,048	6,630	5,974	5,924	5,819	6,326	7,106	6,849			97,441	5,413	77.33%
Stanford	Maples Pavilion	7,233	2,300	3,549	2,334	2,266	2,884	2,284	3,981	2,424	3,033	3,868	70,177	3,899	53.90%
Stanford	Maples Pavilion	7,233	4,172	5,369	7,880	7,291	3,466	4,812	3,771	4,493			70,177	3,899	53.90%
Syracuse	JMA Wireless Dome	33,000	18,762	19,275	18,515	19,657	12,584	13,282	12,258	13,273	12,742	16,245	319,063	17,726	53.71%
Syracuse	JMA Wireless Dome	33,000	18,684	18,738	21,417	21,455	19,053	19,680	23,606	19,837			319,063	17,726	53.71%
Virginia	John Paul Jones Arena	14,593	12,121	12,576	11,393	11,776	11,639	11,117	12,671	12,295	11,533	14,637	204,407	12,775	87.54%
Virginia	John Paul Jones Arena	14,593	14,637	12,264	14,637	14,637	13,526	12,948					204,407	12,775	87.54%
Virginia Tech	Cassell Coliseum	8,925	4,488	5,246	5,295	5,410	6,463	4,288	4,317	4,380	8,925	5,427	108,102	6,359	71.25%
Virginia Tech	Cassell Coliseum	8,925	5,323	8,925	7,769	8,925	8,925	8,925	5,071				108,102	6,359	71.25%
Wake Forest	LJVM Coliseum	14,665	7,023	6,689	6,825	6,049	6,853	7,216	6,355	6,172	7,605	8,460	131,764	7,320	49.92%
Wake Forest	LJVM Coliseum	14,665	7,869	7,579	5,821	8,874	7,219	7,433	9,208	8,514			131,764	7,320	49.92%
