= 2025–26 Virginia Cavaliers men's basketball team =

American men's college basketball season

2025–26 Virginia Cavaliers men's basketball

NCAA tournament, Second round
- Conference: Atlantic Coast Conference

Ranking
- Coaches: No. 15
- AP: No. 17
- Record: 30–6 (15–3 ACC)
- Head coach: Ryan Odom (1st season)
- Associate head coach: Griff Aldrich (1st season)
- Assistant coaches: Matt Henry (1st season); Bryce Crawford (1st season); Darius Theus (1st season)
- Home arena: John Paul Jones Arena

2025–26 ACC men's basketball standings
	Conf.				Overall
Team	W		L	PCT	W		L	PCT
No. 4 Duke †	17	–	1	.944	35	–	3	.921
No. 17 Virginia	15	–	3	.833	30	–	6	.833
No. 24 Miami (FL)	13	–	5	.722	26	–	9	.743
North Carolina	12	–	6	.667	24	–	9	.727
Clemson	12	–	6	.667	24	–	11	.686
No. 23 Louisville	11	–	7	.611	24	–	11	.686
NC State	10	–	8	.556	20	–	14	.588
Florida State	10	–	8	.556	18	–	15	.545
California	9	–	9	.500	22	–	12	.647
Stanford	9	–	9	.500	20	–	13	.606
SMU	8	–	10	.444	20	–	14	.588
Virginia Tech	8	–	10	.444	19	–	13	.594
Wake Forest	7	–	11	.389	18	–	17	.514
Syracuse	6	–	12	.333	15	–	17	.469
Pittsburgh	5	–	13	.278	13	–	20	.394
Notre Dame	4	–	14	.222	13	–	18	.419
Boston College	4	–	14	.222	11	–	20	.355
Georgia Tech	2	–	16	.111	11	–	20	.355
† 2026 ACC tournament winner Rankings from AP Poll

The 2025–26 Virginia Cavaliers men's basketball team represented the University of Virginia during the 2025–26 NCAA Division I men's basketball season. They were led by first-year head coach Ryan Odom following the departure of interim head coach Ron Sanchez. They played their home games at John Paul Jones Arena in Charlottesville, Virginia, as members of the Atlantic Coast Conference.

The Cavaliers began the season with four straight wins before traveling to White Sulphur Springs, West Virginia to participate in the Greenbrier Tip-Off. They won their first game of the tournament to extend their winning streak to six games. The streak ended in the final of the tournament with an eight-point loss to Butler. The Cavaliers picked up where they left off, winning their next three straight games, including a victory at Texas in the ACC–SEC Challenge. These victories saw them enter the AP poll at number twenty-four. They won three further non-conference games against non-Power 4 opponents to rise to twenty-first in the rankings. They began ACC play with a rivalry game against Virginia Tech. The game went to triple overtime and the Cavaliers lost by ten points. The team went on a five-game winning streak after the loss, which included three road victories, one of which was at twentieth-ranked Louisville. They rose to fourteenth in the rankings before losing by five points to twenty-second ranked North Carolina. They fell to seventeenth after the loss, but went on a nine-game winning streak to ascend to eleventh. The streak included one non-conference game, a victory over Ohio State. They did not defeat a ranked team over the stretch, but did notch a double overtime victory at Notre Dame, along with three other road victories. The streak was broken at top-ranked Duke, 51–77. The Cavaliers defeated Wake Forest by five points, and they won their rivalry re-match with Virginia Tech by four points to end the regular season. They were ranked tenth in the AP poll entering the postseason.

The Cavaliers finished the season 30–6 overall and 15–3 in ACC play to finish in second place. As the second seed in the 2026 ACC tournament, they earned a double-bye into the quarterfinals, where they defeated seven seed NC State. They advanced over third seed Miami in the semifinals. They did not win the tournament, as they lost to top seed and top ranked Duke in the Final, 70–74. The Cavaliers earned an at-large bid to the NCAA tournament and were the three-seed in the Midwest region. They were ranked ninth in the AP Poll released prior to the tournament. They defeated fourteen-seed Wright State in the first round before being upset by six-seed and twenty-third ranked Tennessee by six points to end their season.

== Previous season ==
With the last-minute retirement of Tony Bennett and the appointing of interim head coach Ron Sanchez, the Cavaliers started the season 3–0, including a ten-point victory over Villanova in the Hall of Fame Series. They then traveled to the Bahamas to participate in the Baha Mar Hoops Championship, where their fortunes changed. They lost in the semifinals to eleventh-ranked Tennessee 64–42 and in the third place game against twenty second-ranked St. John's 80–55. They won two games against non-Power 4 opponents before losing their ACC–SEC Challenge game against thirteenth-ranked Florida 87–69. They followed that with a loss in their ACC opener against SMU. They finished their non-conference slate 2–1, with a loss against twenty-first-ranked Memphis. They closed the 2024 portion of their schedule with an ACC win over NC State. The Cavaliers had a rough start to the 2025 portion of the schedule, as they went on a five-game losing streak. This included two losses to Louisville, and losses in California to Stanford and California, and a loss in a rematch with SMU. They broke the streak by going 2–2 in their next four games. This streak included a loss in their rivalry game against Virginia Tech. The team went 4–2 over their next six games, which included a three-game winning streak. They defeated Pittsburgh, Georgia Tech, and Wake Forest, and won the rivalry rematch with Virginia Tech. However, they lost to third-ranked Duke and at North Carolina. They lost to thirteenth-ranked Clemson and defeated Florida State by three points in their next two games. The Cavaliers lost the regular season finale to Syracuse 84–70.

The Cavaliers finished the season 15–16 and 8–12 in ACC play to finish in a five-way tie for ninth place. The team finished atop the five-way tiebreaker and were the ninth seed in the 2025 ACC tournament. They faced eighth-seed Georgia Tech in the first round. Despite defeating the Yellow Jackets during the regular season, they were defeated 66–60 in the tournament. They were not invited to the NCAA tournament or the NIT. Interim coach Ron Sanchez was not retained at the end of the season.

== Offseason ==
=== Coaching departures ===
Virginia coaching departures
Name	Position	Years on staff	New position
Ron Sanchez	Interim head coach	11	Associate head coach at Baylor
Jason Williford	Associate head coach	16	Assistant coach at Georgetown
Orlando Vandross	Assistant coach	10	
Isaiah Wilkins	Assistant coach	4	Assistant coach at Cal
Brad Soderberg	Assistant coach	10	Assistant coach at Millikin
Kyle Guy	Special assistant	1	Assistant coach at Nevada
Chase Coleman	Graduate assistant	2	Assistant coach at Navy
Ronnie Wideman	Assoc. AD for MBB admin	16	Assoc. AD at Virginia (Note: Promotion)
Stelios Tzoutzis	Program & operations assistant	5	Assistant coach & GM at Liberty

=== Player departures ===
Virginia player departures
Name	Number	Pos.	Height	Weight	Year	Hometown	Reason for departure
Blake Buchanan	0	F	6'11"	225	Sophomore	Coeur d'Alene, ID	Transferred to Iowa State
Elijah Saunders	2	F	6'8"	229	Junior	Phoenix, AZ	Transferred to Maryland
Andrew Rohde	4	G	6'6"	202	Junior	Milwaukee, WI	Transferred to Wisconsin
Jacob Cofie	5	F	6'10"	230	Freshman	Seattle, WA	Transferred to USC
Dai Dai Ames	7	G	6'1"	190	Sophomore	Milwaukee, WI	Transferred to California
Bryce Walker	8	G	6'2"	205	Senior	Beltsville, MD	Graduated
Ishan Sharma	9	G	6'5"	192	Freshman	Milton, ON	Transferred to Saint Louis
Taine Murray	10	G	6'5"	208	Senior	Auckland, NZ	Graduated
Isaac McKneely	11	G	6'4"	188	Junior	Poca, WV	Transferred to Louisville
Anthony Robinson	21	F/C	6'10"	250	(redshirt) Freshman	Peachtree City, GA	Transferred to Xavier
TJ Power	23	F	6'9"	221	Sophomore	Shrewsbury, MA	Transferred to Penn
Christian Bliss	30	G	6'4"	198	(redshirt) Freshman	Queens, NY	Transferred to Delaware

=== Coaching arrivals ===
Virginia coaching arrivals
Name	Previous position	Previous school	New position
Ryan Odom	Head coach	VCU	Head coach
Griff Aldrich	Head coach	Longwood	Associate head coach
Matt Henry	Assistant coach	VCU	Assistant coach
Bryce Crawford	Assistant coach	VCU	Assistant coach
Darius Theus	Assistant coach	VCU	Assistant coach
Kelsey Knoche	Director of operations	VCU	Director of operations
Matt Hart	Director of analytics	VCU	Director of analytics
Billy Bales	Director of video	VCU	Video coordinator
Ahmad Thomas	Coordinator of player development	VCU	Director of recruiting
Michael Crowder	Managing director – culture formation & program development	Longwood	Director of culture and alumni engagement

=== Incoming transfers ===
Virginia incoming transfers
Name	Number	Pos.	Height	Weight	Year	Hometown	Previous school	Remaining years of eligibility
Malik Thomas	1	G	6'5"	205	Graduate student	Fontana, CA	San Francisco	1
Sam Lewis	5	G	6'6"	210	Junior	Chicago, IL	Toledo	2
Jacari White	6	G	6'3"	180	Senior	Orlando, FL	North Dakota State	1
Martin Carrere	7	G/F	6'8"	180	(redshirt) Freshman	Pontonx-sur-l'Adour, France	VCU	4
Devin Tillis	11	F	6'7"	225	Graduate student	Los Angeles, CA	UC Irvine	1
Dallin Hall	30	G	6'4"	197	Graduate student	Plain City, UT	BYU	1
Ugonna Onyenso	33	C	7'0"	247	Senior	Owerri, Nigeria	Kansas State	1

=== 2025 recruiting class ===
College recruiting
Name	Hometown	School	Height	Weight	Commit date
Chance Mallory #14 PG	Charlottesville, VA	St. Anne's-Belfield School	5 ft 9 in (1.75 m)	165 lb (75 kg)	Mar 22, 2025
Chance Mallory #14 PG	Recruit ratings: Rivals: 247Sports: ESPN: (83)				
Silas Barksdale #21 C	Newport News, VA	Woodside High School	6 ft 8 in (2.03 m)	225 lb (102 kg)	Apr 2, 2025
Silas Barksdale #21 C	Recruit ratings: Rivals: 247Sports: ESPN: (81)				
Johann Grünloh; C	Löningen, Germany	Rasta Vechta	6 ft 11 in (2.11 m)	245 lb (111 kg)	Apr 28, 2025
Johann Grünloh; C	Recruit ratings: No ratings found				
Thijs De Ridder; PF	Brasschaat, Belgium	Gitok Kalmthout	6 ft 8 in (2.03 m)	231 lb (105 kg)	Jul 7, 2025
Thijs De Ridder; PF	Recruit ratings: No ratings found				
Overall recruit ranking: Rivals: 49 247Sports: 40 ESPN: –
Note: In many cases, Scout, Rivals, 247Sports, On3, and ESPN may conflict in their listings of height and weight.; In these cases, the average was taken. ESPN grades are on a 100-point scale.; Sources: "Virginia 2025 Basketball Commitments". Rivals.; "2025 Virginia Commits". Scout.; "2025 Player Commits". ESPN.; "Scout.com Team Recruiting Rankings". Scout.; "2025 Team Ranking". Rivals.; "Virginia 2025 Basketball Commitments". 247Sports.

== Roster ==
=== Players ===
2024–25 Virginia Cavaliers men's basketball team
Players
Coaches

Pos.	#	Name	Height	Weight	Year	Previous school	Hometown
G	1	Malik Thomas	6 ft 5 in (1.96 m)	215 lb (98 kg)	GS	Damien HS; San Francisco	Fontana, CA
G	2	Chance Mallory	5 ft 10 in (1.78 m)	186 lb (84 kg)	Fr	St. Anne's-Belfield School	Charlottesville, VA
G	5	Sam Lewis	6 ft 7 in (2.01 m)	210 lb (95 kg)	Jr	Simeon Academy; Toledo	Chicago, IL
G	6	Jacari White	6 ft 3 in (1.91 m)	180 lb (82 kg)	GS	Olympia HS; North Dakota State	Orlando, FL
G/F	7	Martin Carrere	6 ft 9 in (2.06 m)	198 lb (90 kg)	RS Fr	Limoges; VCU	Pontonx-sur-l'Adour, France
F	11	Devin Tillis	6 ft 7 in (2.01 m)	240 lb (109 kg)	GS	Windward School; UC Irvine	Los Angeles, CA
G	12	Elijah Gertrude	6 ft 4 in (1.93 m)	173 lb (78 kg)	RS So	Hudson Catholic Regional	Jersey City, NJ
G	13	Desmond Roberts (W)	6 ft 4 in (1.93 m)	195 lb (88 kg)	RS So	St. Anne's-Belfield School	Charlottesville, VA
C	17	Johann Grünloh	7 ft 0 in (2.13 m)	238 lb (108 kg)	Fr	RASTA Vechta	Löningen, Germany
F	21	Silas Barksdale	6 ft 9 in (2.06 m)	223 lb (101 kg)	Fr	Woodside HS	Newport News, VA
F	22	Owen Odom	6 ft 1 in (1.85 m)	171 lb (78 kg)	Fr	Collegiate School	Annapolis, MD
F	28	Thijs De Ridder	6 ft 9 in (2.06 m)	238 lb (108 kg)	Fr	Gitok Kalmthout; Surne Bilbao Basket	Brasschaat, Belgium
G	30	Dallin Hall	6 ft 4 in (1.93 m)	197 lb (89 kg)	GS	Fremont HS; BYU	Plain City, UT
C	33	Ugonna Onyenso	7 ft 0 in (2.13 m)	245 lb (111 kg)	Sr	Putnam Science Academy; Kansas State	Owerri, Nigeria
F	35	Carter Lang (W)	6 ft 9 in (2.06 m)	251 lb (114 kg)	RS So	St. Anne's-Belfield School; Vanderbilt	Charlottesville, VA

Head coach

- Ryan Odom (Hampden–Sydney)

Assistant coach(es)

- Griff Aldrich (Hampden–Sydney)
- Matt Henry (Trinity)
- Bryce Crawford (Ohio State)
- Darius Theus (VCU)

Legend

- (C) Team captain
- (S) Suspended
- (I) Ineligible
- (W) Walk-on
- Injured
- Current redshirt

Roster
Last update: July 19, 2025

=== Coaches ===
Virginia coaching staff
Name	Position	Year with position	Year on coaching staff	Alma mater	Nationality
Ryan Odom	Dean and Markel Families head coach	1	1	Hampden–Sydney	United States
Griff Aldrich	Associate head coach	1	1	Hampden–Sydney	United States
Matt Henry	Assistant coach	1	1	Trinity	United States
Bryce Crawford	Assistant coach	1	1	Ohio State	United States
Darius Theus	Assistant coach	1	1	VCU	United States
Kelsey Knoche	Director of operations	1	1	Maryland	United States
Matt Hart	Director of analytics	1	1	George Washington	United States
Billy Bales	Video coordinator	1	1	Lenoir-Rhyne	United States
Ahmad Thomas	Director of recruiting	1	1	UNC Asheville	United States
Michael Crowder	Director of culture and alumni engagement	1	1	Virginia	United States
Mike Curtis	Strength and conditioning coach	17	17	Virginia	United States
Ethan Saliba	Head athletic trainer	28	43	Kansas	United States

== Schedule and results ==
Date time, TV	Rank^{#}	Opponent^{#}	Result	Record	High points	High rebounds	High assists	Site (attendance) city, state
Exhibition
October 16, 2025*; 7:30 p.m.		at Vanderbilt	L 87–95	—	–	–	–	Memorial Gymnasium; Nashville, TN
October 24, 2025*; 7:00 p.m., ACCNX		Villanova	W 75–72		16 – Thomas	8 – Tied	5 – Hall	John Paul Jones Arena (13,751); Charlottesville, VA
Regular season
November 3, 2025*; 7:00 p.m., ACCNX		Rider	W 87–53	1–0	21 – De Ridder	10 – De Ridder	5 – Hall	John Paul Jones Arena (12,121); Charlottesville, VA
November 7, 2025*; 7:00 p.m., ACCNX		NC Central	W 81–62	2–0	20 – De Ridder	11 – Grunloh	7 – Hall	John Paul Jones Arena (12,576); Charlottesville, VA
November 11, 2025*; 9:00 p.m., ACCN		Hampton	W 91–53	3–0	18 – Onyenso	10 – Onyenso	7 – Hall	John Paul Jones Arena (11,393); Charlottesville, VA
November 15, 2025*; 12:00 p.m., ACCNX		Marshall	W 104–78	4–0	23 – De Ridder	7 – Gruenloh	5 – Mallory	John Paul Jones Arena (11,776); Charlottesville, VA
November 21, 2025*; 5:00 p.m., CBSSN		vs. Northwestern; Greenbrier Tip-Off	W 83–78	5–0	26 – De Ridder	8 – Tied	3 – Tied	The Greenbrier (1,209); White Sulphur Springs, WV
November 23, 2025*; 2:00 p.m., CBSSN		vs. Butler; Greenbrier Tip-Off	L 73–80	5–1	24 – Thomas	7 – Tied	3 – Mallory	The Greenbrier (1,209); White Sulphur Springs, WV
November 28, 2025*; 4:00 p.m., ACCNX		Queens	W 94–69	6–1	21 – De Ridder	10 – Grünloh	5 – Hall	John Paul Jones Arena (11,639); Charlottesville, VA
December 3, 2025*; 9:15 p.m., ESPNU		at Texas; ACC–SEC Challenge	W 88–69	7–1	16 – Mallory	6 – Tied	4 – Hall	Moody Center (10,802); Austin, TX
December 6, 2025*; 12:00 p.m., ESPN2		vs. Dayton	W 86–73	8–1	25 – White	9 – De Ridder	5 – Mallory	Spectrum Center (4,175); Charlotte, NC
December 9, 2025*; 7:00 p.m., ACCNX	No. 24	Maryland Eastern Shore	W 84–60	9–1	15 – Lewis	7 – Grünloh	5 – Mallory	John Paul Jones Arena (11,117); Charlottesville, VA
December 20, 2025*; 6:00 p.m., ESPN	No. 23т	Maryland	W 80–72	10–1	20 – Hall	8 – Grünloh	6 – Tied	John Paul Jones Arena (12,671); Charlottesville, VA
December 22, 2025*; 6:00 p.m., ACCN	No. 21	American	W 95–51	11–1	27 – De Ridder	8 – De Ridder	7 – Hall	John Paul Jones Arena (12,295); Charlottesville, VA
December 31, 2025; 2:00 p.m., ACCN	No. 21	at Virginia Tech; Rivalry	L 85–95 ^{3OT}	11–2 (0–1)	26 – Thomas	13 – De Ridder	5 – De Ridder	Cassell Coliseum (8,925); Blacksburg, VA
January 3, 2026; 11:00 a.m., ESPN2	No. 21	at NC State	W 76–61	12–2 (1–1)	23 – Lewis	7 – Thomas	4 – Tied	Lenovo Center (16,144); Raleigh, NC
January 7, 2026; 9:00 p.m., ACCN	No. 23	California	W 84–60	13–2 (2–1)	20 – Thomas	9 – Onyenso	7 – Mallory	John Paul Jones Arena (11,533); Charlottesville, VA
January 10, 2026; 2:15 p.m., The CW	No. 23	Stanford	W 70–55	14–2 (3–1)	22 – De Ridder	7 – Thomas	6 – Hall	John Paul Jones Arena (14,637); Charlottesville, VA
January 13, 2026; 7:00 p.m., ESPN2	No. 16	at No. 20 Louisville	W 79–70	15–2 (4–1)	19 – Thomas	12 – Hall	4 – Tied	KFC Yum Center (14,697); Louisville, KY
January 17, 2026; 12:00 p.m., ESPN2	No. 16	at SMU	W 72–68	16–2 (5–1)	23 – Thomas	11 – Thomas	9 – Hall	Moody Coliseum (6,630); Dallas, TX
January 24, 2026; 12:00 p.m., ESPN2	No. 14	No. 22 North Carolina	L 80–85	16–3 (5–2)	20 – De Ridder	8 – De Ridder	4 – Hall	John Paul Jones Arena (14,637); Charlottesville, VA
January 27, 2026; 7:00 p.m., ESPN2	No. 17	at Notre Dame	W 100–97 ^{2OT}	17–3 (6–2)	32 – De Ridder	9 – Lewis	6 – Lewis	Joyce Center (4,012); South Bend, IN
January 31, 2026; 1:30 p.m., The CW	No. 17	at Boston College	W 73–66	18–3 (7–2)	17 – De Ridder	7 – Onyenso	3 – Hall	Conte Forum (6,248); Chestnut Hill, MA
February 3, 2026; 9:00 p.m., ACCN	No. 18	Pittsburgh	W 67–47	19–3 (8–2)	15 – Lewis	12 – De Ridder	4 – Tillis	John Paul Jones Arena (12,264); Charlottesville, VA
February 7, 2026; 12:00 p.m., ESPN	No. 18	Syracuse	W 72–59	20–3 (9–2)	16 – Lewis	8 – Onyenso	5 – Tied	John Paul Jones Arena (14,637); Charlottesville, VA
February 10, 2026; 7:00 p.m., ESPNU	No. 15	at Florida State	W 61–58	21–3 (10–2)	19 – White	9 – De Ridder	5 – Mallory	Donald L. Tucker Center (7,377); Tallahassee, FL
February 14, 2026*; 8:00 p.m., FOX	No. 15	vs. Ohio State; Nashville Hoops Showdown	W 70–66	22–3	13 – Thomas	10 – Onyenso	2 – Tied	Bridgestone Arena (6,438); Nashville, TN
February 18, 2026; 9:00 p.m., ACCN	No. 14	at Georgia Tech	W 94–68	23–3 (11–2)	22 – De Ridder	9 – Onyenso	10 – Hall	McCamish Pavilion (5,056); Atlanta, GA
February 21, 2026; 2:00 p.m., ESPN2	No. 14	Miami	W 86–83	24–3 (12–2)	17 – White	6 – Mallory	6 – Mallory	John Paul Jones Arena (14,637); Charlottesville, VA
February 24, 2026; 7:00 p.m., ACCN	No. 11	NC State	W 90–61	25–3 (13–2)	19 – De Ridder	7 – Hall	4 – Tied	John Paul Jones Arena (13,526); Charlottesville, VA
February 28, 2026; 12:00 p.m., ESPN	No. 11	at No. 1 Duke	L 51–77	25–4 (13–3)	16 – De Ridder	6 – Thomas	4 – Hall	Cameron Indoor Stadium (9,314); Durham, NC
March 3, 2026; 7:00 p.m., ACCN	No. 13	Wake Forest	W 75–70	26–4 (14–3)	16 – De Ridder	9 – Grünloh	4 – Hall	John Paul Jones Arena (12,948); Charlottesville, VA
March 7, 2026; 12:00 p.m., The CW	No. 13	Virginia Tech; Rivalry	W 76–72	27–4 (15–3)	16 – Tied	8 – De Ridder	9 – Hall	John Paul Jones Arena (14,637); Charlottesville, VA
ACC Tournament
March 12, 2026; 12:00 p.m., ESPN2	(2) No. 10	vs. (7) NC State; Quarterfinal	W 81–74	28–4	16 – Thomas	6 – Onyenso	5 – Thomas	Spectrum Center (11,722); Charlotte, NC
March 13, 2026; 7:00 p.m., ESPN2	(2) No. 10	vs. (3) Miami; Semifinal	W 84–62	29–4	17 – Onyenso	6 – De Ridder	6 – Mallory	Spectrum Center (17,711); Charlotte, NC
March 14, 2026; 8:30 p.m., ESPN	(2) No. 10	vs. (1) No. 1 Duke; Final	L 70–74	29–5	18 – Thomas	8 – Onyenso	4 – Mallory	Spectrum Center (17,781); Charlotte, NC
NCAA Tournament
March 20, 2026; 1:50 p.m., TBS	(3 MW) No. 9	vs. (14 MW) Wright State; First round	W 82–73	30–5	26 – White	7 – Grünloh	3 – Hall	Xfinity Mobile Arena (19,686); Philadelphia, PA
March 22, 2026; 6:10 p.m., TNT	(3 MW) No. 9	vs. (6 MW) No. 23 Tennessee; Second round	L 72–79	30–6	22 – De Ridder	7 – Hall	7 – Hall	Xfinity Mobile Arena (19,279); Philadelphia, PA
*Non-conference game. ^{#}Rankings from AP poll. (#) Tournament seedings in parentheses. MW=Midwest. All times are in Eastern Time.

== Rankings ==
Ranking movements Legend: ██ Increase in ranking ██ Decrease in ranking — = Not ranked RV = Received votes т = Tied with team above or below
	Week																				
Poll	Pre	1	2	3	4	5	6	7	8	9	10	11	12	13	14	15	16	17	18	19	Final
AP	RV	—	RV	—	—	24	23т	21	21	23	16	14	17	18	15	14	11	13	10	9	17
Coaches	RV	RV	RV	RV	RV	25	22	21	21	23	16	15	17	17	15	14	12	13	11	8	15
