= 2025–26 Louisville Cardinals men's basketball team =

American college basketball season

2025–26 Louisville Cardinals men's basketball

NCAA tournament, Second round
- Conference: Atlantic Coast Conference

Ranking
- Coaches: No. 23
- AP: No. 23
- Record: 24–11 (11–7 ACC)
- Head coach: Pat Kelsey (2nd season)
- Assistant coaches: Brian Kloman; Thomas Carr; Ronnie Hamilton; Mike Cassidy; Jermaine Ukaegbu
- Home arena: KFC Yum! Center

2025–26 ACC men's basketball standings
	Conf.				Overall
Team	W		L	PCT	W		L	PCT
No. 4 Duke †	17	–	1	.944	35	–	3	.921
No. 17 Virginia	15	–	3	.833	30	–	6	.833
No. 24 Miami (FL)	13	–	5	.722	26	–	9	.743
North Carolina	12	–	6	.667	24	–	9	.727
Clemson	12	–	6	.667	24	–	11	.686
No. 23 Louisville	11	–	7	.611	24	–	11	.686
NC State	10	–	8	.556	20	–	14	.588
Florida State	10	–	8	.556	18	–	15	.545
California	9	–	9	.500	22	–	12	.647
Stanford	9	–	9	.500	20	–	13	.606
SMU	8	–	10	.444	20	–	14	.588
Virginia Tech	8	–	10	.444	19	–	13	.594
Wake Forest	7	–	11	.389	18	–	17	.514
Syracuse	6	–	12	.333	15	–	17	.469
Pittsburgh	5	–	13	.278	13	–	20	.394
Notre Dame	4	–	14	.222	13	–	18	.419
Boston College	4	–	14	.222	11	–	20	.355
Georgia Tech	2	–	16	.111	11	–	20	.355
† 2026 ACC tournament winner Rankings from AP Poll

The 2025–26 Louisville Cardinals men's basketball team represented the University of Louisville during the 2025–26 NCAA Division I men's basketball season. The team played its home games on Denny Crum Court at the KFC Yum! Center in downtown Louisville, Kentucky as members of the Atlantic Coast Conference (ACC). They were led by second-year head coach Pat Kelsey.

The Cardinals began the season with seven straight wins, which saw them rise from eleventh in the AP poll to sixth. The run included two games against Power 4 opponents. The first was a 96–88 victory over rivals and ninth-ranked Kentucky. The second was a ten-point win over rivals Cincinnati. Their streak was broken in the ACC–SEC Challenge at twenty-fifth ranked Arkansas, where they lost by nine points. The team followed the loss with a victory in the CareSource Invitational over twenty-second ranked Indiana. The win was not enough to prevent them from sliding back to eleventh in the AP poll. They defeated rivals Memphis 99–73 before losing 62–83 at twentieth-ranked Tennessee. The Cardinals defeated Montana before falling to sixteenth in the AP poll to begin ACC play. They went 2–3 in their first five games, winning the opener at California and defeating Boston College but losing to sixth-ranked Duke, sixteenth-ranked Virginia, and at Stanford. The team went 5–1 over their next six games, with the only loss coming to fourth-ranked Duke. On February 9, 2026, Mikel Brown Jr. broke the ACC Freshman scoring record and tied the Louisville program 59-year scoring record with 45 points in a 118–77 win against NC State. Ryan Conwell added 31 points marking the first 30-point scoring duo in program history. Despite the winning streak, the Cardinals feel to twenty fourth in the AP poll by the end of the run. They defeated Baylor 82–71 at a neutral site to move up to twenty-first, but lost three of their next four games to fall out of the rankings. They only defeated Georgia Tech while losing at SMU, at Clemson, and at eighteenth-ranked North Carolina. They finished their regular season with defeats of Syracuse and twenty-second ranked Miami.

The Cardinals finished the season 24–11 overall and 11–7 in ACC play to finish in a sixth place. As the sixth seed in the 2026 ACC tournament, they earned a bye into the Second Round where they defeated SMU by four points. Their run ended there as they lost to Miami in a re-match of their final regular season game. The Cardinals earned an at-large bid to the NCAA tournament and were the six-seed in the East region. They defeated eleven-seed South Florida in the First Round before losing to third-seed and eleventh ranked Michigan State in the Second Round to end their season.

== Previous season ==
The Cardinals finished the 2024–25 season with a record of 27–8, 18–2 in ACC play, finishing in a tie for 2nd place. As the second seed in the 2025 ACC tournament they earned a bye into Quarterfinals where they defeated seventh seed Stanford for the second time in five days. The tournament game was much closer as the Cardinals advanced 75–73. In the Semifinals they defeated third seed and tenth-ranked Clemson 76–73. They lost to first seed and top ranked Duke 73–62 in the final. They received an at-large bid to the NCAA tournament as a No. 8 seed, where they lost in the first round to Creighton.

== Offseason ==
=== Departures ===
Departures
Name	Number	Pos.	Height	Weight	Year	Hometown	Reason for departure
James Scott	0	C	6'11"	210	Sophomore	Fayetteville, NC	Transferred to Ole Miss
Koren Johnson	3	G	6'2"	175	Junior	Seattle, WA	Transferred to Ole Miss
Reyne Smith	6	G	6'2"	190	Senior	Ulverstone, Australia	Graduated
Patrick Antonelly	12	G	5'11"	170	5th	Mount Pleasant, SC	Graduated
Frank Anselem-Ibe	13	C	6'10"	220	5th	Lagos, Nigeria	Graduated
Chucky Hepburn	24	G	6'2"	190	Senior	Omaha, NE	Graduated and signed two-way NBA contract with the Toronto Raptors
Aidan McCool	33	G	6'3"	170	Graduate Student	Charleston, SC	Graduated
Noah Waterman	93	F	6'11"	230	6th	Savannah, NY	Graduated and signed professional overseas deal by the Yamagata Wyverns.

=== Incoming transfers ===
Incoming transfers
Name	Number	Pos.	Height	Weight	Year	Hometown	Previous school
Ryan Conwell	3	G	6'4"	215	Senior	Indianapolis, IN	Xavier
Isaac McKneely	10	G	6'4"	195	Senior	Poca, WV	Virginia
Adrian Wooley	14	G	6'5"	200	Sophomore	Tuscaloosa, AL	Kennesaw State

=== 2025 recruiting class ===
College recruiting
Name	Hometown	School	Height	Weight	Commit date
Mikel Brown Jr. #1 PG	Orlando, FL	DME Academy	6 ft 3 in (1.91 m)	165 lb (75 kg)	Jan 1, 2025
Mikel Brown Jr. #1 PG	Recruit ratings: Rivals: 247Sports: On3: ESPN: (95)				
Sananda Fru #36 PF	Berlin, Germany	Basketball Löwen Braunschweig	6 ft 11 in (2.11 m)	245 lb (111 kg)	Feb 11, 2025
Sananda Fru #36 PF	Recruit ratings: Rivals: 247Sports: On3:				
Mouhamed Camara #59 PF	Dakar, Senegal	NBA Academy Africa	6 ft 7 in (2.01 m)	215 lb (98 kg)	May 19, 2025
Mouhamed Camara #59 PF	Recruit ratings: Rivals: 247Sports: On3:				
Vangelis Zougris; C	Peristeri, Greece	Peristeri B.C.	6 ft 8 in (2.03 m)	260 lb (120 kg)	May 29, 2025
Vangelis Zougris; C	Recruit ratings: No ratings found				
Overall recruit ranking: 247Sports: 25 On3: 38
Note: In many cases, Scout, Rivals, 247Sports, On3, and ESPN may conflict in their listings of height and weight.; In these cases, the average was taken. ESPN grades are on a 100-point scale.; Sources: "Louisville 2025 Basketball Commitments". Rivals.; "2025 Louisville Cardinals Recruiting Class". ESPN.; "2025 Team Ranking". Rivals.; "2025 Louisville 24/7 Sports Commits". 247Sports.; "2025 Louisville Cardinals Basketball Industry Comparison Commits". On3.

== Roster ==
2025–26 Louisville Cardinals men's basketball team
Players
Coaches

Pos.	#	Name	Height	Weight	Year	Previous school	Hometown
G	0	Mikel Brown Jr.	6 ft 5 in (1.96 m)	180 lb (82 kg)	Fr	DME Academy	Orlando, FL
G	1	J'Vonne Hadley	6 ft 7 in (2.01 m)	210 lb (95 kg)	GS	Colorado	St. Paul, MN
G	3	Ryan Conwell	6 ft 4 in (1.93 m)	215 lb (98 kg)	Sr	Xavier	Indianapolis, IN
G	4	Cole Sherman (W)	5 ft 11 in (1.8 m)	190 lb (86 kg)	Sr	Northern Kentucky	Louisville, KY
F	7	Kasean Pryor	6 ft 10 in (2.08 m)	230 lb (104 kg)	GS	South Florida	Chicago, IL
F	9	Khani Rooths	6 ft 10 in (2.08 m)	210 lb (95 kg)	So	IMG Academy	Washington, D.C.
G	10	Isaac McKneely	6 ft 4 in (1.93 m)	195 lb (88 kg)	Sr	Virginia	Poca, WV
G	11	Kobe Rodgers	6 ft 3 in (1.91 m)	185 lb (84 kg)	RS Sr	Charleston	Cincinnati, OH
F	12	Mouhamed Camara	6 ft 8 in (2.03 m)	225 lb (102 kg)	Fr	NBA Academy Africa	Dakar, Senegal
F/C	13	Sananda Fru	6 ft 11 in (2.11 m)	245 lb (111 kg)	Jr	Löwen Braunschweig	Berlin, Germany
G	14	Adrian Wooley	6 ft 5 in (1.96 m)	200 lb (91 kg)	So	Kennesaw State	Tuscaloosa, AL
C	15	Aly Khalifa	7 ft 0 in (2.13 m)	250 lb (113 kg)	RS Sr	BYU	Alexandria, Egypt
G	33	Will Hanke (W)	6 ft 4 in (1.93 m)	200 lb (91 kg)	Fr	St. Xavier High School	Louisville, KY
F/C	53	Vangelis Zougris	6 ft 8 in (2.03 m)	240 lb (109 kg)	Jr	Peristeri B.C.	Peristeri, Greece
G	55	Spencer Legg (W)	6 ft 7 in (2.01 m)	200 lb (91 kg)	Sr	Charleston	Washington, D.C.

Head coach

- Pat Kelsey (Xavier)

Assistant coach(es)

- Brian Kloman (Tennessee)
- Ronnie Hamilton (UNC Pembroke)
- Thomas Carr (Pfeiffer)
- Mike Cassidy (ACPE)
- Jermaine Ukaegbu (Winthrop)

Legend

- (C) Team captain
- (S) Suspended
- (I) Ineligible
- (W) Walk-on
- Injured
- Current redshirt

Roster
Last update: October 13, 2025

== Schedule and results ==
Date time, TV	Rank^{#}	Opponent^{#}	Result	Record	High points	High rebounds	High assists	Site (attendance) city, state
Exhibition
October 24, 2025*; 7:30 p.m., ACCN	No. 11	No. 19 Kansas	L 82–90	–	26 – Conwell	9 – Hadley	3 – Khalifa	KFC Yum! Center (15,885); Louisville, KY
October 28, 2025*; 7:00 p.m., ACCNX/ESPN+	No. 11	Bucknell; Kentuckiana Friend of V Classic	W 99–76	–	28 – Brown Jr.	8 – Conwell	6 – Brown Jr.	KFC Yum! Center (13,840); Louisville, KY
Regular season
November 3, 2025*; 9:00 p.m., ACCN	No. 11	South Carolina State	W 104–45	1–0	20 – Rooths	9 – Hadley	6 – Brown Jr.	KFC Yum! Center (14,218); Louisville, KY
November 6, 2025*; 7:00 p.m., ACCNX	No. 11	Jackson State	W 106–70	2–0	19 – Conwell	10 – Rooths	9 – Brown Jr.	KFC Yum! Center (14,412); Louisville, KY
November 11, 2025*; 8:00 p.m., ESPN	No. 12	No. 9 Kentucky; Rivalry	W 96–88	3–0	29 – Brown Jr.	8 – Hadley	5 – Brown Jr.	KFC Yum! Center (22,586); Louisville, KY
November 15, 2025*; 12:00 p.m., The CW	No. 12	Ohio	W 106–81	4–0	22 – Conwell	6 – Tied	7 – Brown Jr.	KFC Yum! Center (14,899); Louisville, KY
November 21, 2025*; 6:30 p.m., ESPN2	No. 6	vs. Cincinnati; Rivalry — The Hoops Classic	W 74–64	5–0	25 – Conwell	5 – Tied	6 – Brown Jr.	Heritage Bank Center (8,507); Cincinnati, OH
November 24, 2025*; 7:00 p.m., ACCN	No. 6	Eastern Michigan	W 87–46	6–0	17 – McKneely	8 – Rooths	5 – Khalifa	KFC Yum! Center (13,832); Louisville, KY
November 26, 2025*; 9:00 p.m., ACCN	No. 6	NJIT	W 104–47	7–0	32 – Conwell	9 – Tied	7 – Brown Jr.	KFC Yum! Center (13,825); Louisville, KY
December 3, 2025*; 7:00 p.m., ESPN	No. 6	at No. 25 Arkansas; ACC–SEC Challenge	L 80–89	7–1	22 – Brown Jr.	8 – Fru	4 – Conwell	Bud Walton Arena (19,600); Fayetteville, AR
December 6, 2025*; 2:15 p.m., CBS	No. 6	vs. No. 22 Indiana; CareSource Invitational	W 87–78	8–1	21 – Conwell	7 – Fru	3 – Tied	Gainbridge Fieldhouse (18,777); Indianapolis, IN
December 13, 2025*; 3:30 p.m., ESPN	No. 11	Memphis; Rivalry	W 99–73	9–1	17 – Conwell	8 – Rooths	4 – Tied	KFC Yum! Center (16,355); Louisville, KY
December 16, 2025*; 7:00 p.m., ESPN	No. 11	at No. 20 Tennessee	L 62–83	9–2	22 – Conwell	5 – Tied	3 – Fru	Thompson–Boling Arena (21,678); Knoxville, TN
December 20, 2025*; 12:00 p.m., ACCN	No. 11	Montana	W 94–54	10–2	18 – Fru	8 – Fru	6 – Khalifa	KFC Yum! Center (14,076); Louisville, KY
December 30, 2025; 9:00 p.m., ACCN	No. 16	at California	W 90–70	11–2 (1–0)	26 – Conwell	14 – Fru	4 – Tied	Haas Pavilion (6,012); Berkeley, CA
January 2, 2026; 8:00 p.m., ACCN	No. 16	at Stanford	L 76–80	11–3 (1–1)	18 – Conwell	8 – Fru	3 – Tied	Maples Pavilion (4,172); Stanford, CA
January 6, 2026; 7:00 p.m., ESPN	No. 20	No. 6 Duke	L 73–84	11–4 (1–2)	24 – Conwell	7 – Conwell	4 – Hadley	KFC Yum! Center (17,656); Louisville, KY
January 10, 2026; 12:00 p.m., The CW	No. 20	Boston College	W 75–62	12–4 (2–2)	19 – Fru	13 – Fru	4 – Wooley	KFC Yum! Center (14,585); Louisville, KY
January 13, 2026; 7:00 p.m., ESPN2	No. 20	No. 16 Virginia	L 70–79	12–5 (2–3)	23 – McKneely	7 – Conwell	4 – Wooley	KFC Yum! Center (14,697); Louisville, KY
January 17, 2026; 8:00 p.m., ESPN2	No. 20	at Pittsburgh	W 100–59	13–5 (3–3)	24 – Conwell	7 – Hadley	6 – Conwell	Petersen Events Center (6,070); Pittsburgh, PA
January 24, 2026; 2:15 p.m., The CW	No. 23	Virginia Tech	W 85–71	14–5 (4–3)	20 – Brown Jr.	10 – Fru	6 – Brown Jr.	KFC Yum! Center (14,907); Louisville, KY
January 26, 2026; 7:00 p.m., ESPN	No. 20	at No. 4 Duke	L 52–83	14–6 (4–4)	18 – Conwell	5 – Hadley	4 – Brown Jr.	Cameron Indoor Stadium (9,314); Durham, NC
January 31, 2026; 2:00 p.m., ESPN	No. 20	SMU	W 88–74	15–6 (5–4)	20 – Brown Jr.	10 – Rooths	4 – Tied	KFC Yum! Center (14,847); Louisville, KY
February 4, 2026; 7:00 p.m., ESPN2	No. 24	Notre Dame	W 76–65	16–6 (6–4)	13 – McKneely	12 – Rooths	6 – Brown Jr.	KFC Yum! Center (14,787); Louisville, KY
February 7, 2026; 12:00 p.m., ACCN	No. 24	at Wake Forest	W 88–80	17–6 (7–4)	17 – Fru	6 – Fru	8 – Brown Jr.	LJVM Coliseum (8,874); Winston-Salem, NC
February 9, 2026; 7:00 p.m., ESPN	No. 24	NC State	W 118–77	18–6 (8–4)	45 – Brown Jr.	9 – Brown Jr.	6 – Conwell	KFC Yum! Center (14,389); Louisville, KY
February 14, 2026*; 4:00 p.m., ESPN	No. 24	vs. Baylor	W 82–71	19–6	29 – Brown Jr.	7 – Fru	6 – Brown Jr.	Dickies Arena (3,314); Fort Worth, TX
February 17, 2026; 7:00 p.m., ESPN2	No. 21	at SMU	L 85–95	19–7 (8–5)	29 – Brown Jr.	9 – Hadley	5 – Khalifa	Moody Coliseum (6,326); University Park, TX
February 21, 2026; 2:15 p.m., The CW	No. 21	Georgia Tech	W 87–70	20–7 (9–5)	19 – Brown Jr.	5 – Hadley	4 – Conwell	KFC Yum! Center (16,350); Louisville, KY
February 23, 2026; 7:00 p.m., ESPN	No. 24	at No. 18 North Carolina	L 74–77	20–8 (9–6)	24 – Brown Jr.	6 – Tied	2 – Tied	Dean E. Smith Center (20,577); Chapel Hill, NC
February 28, 2026; 2:00 p.m., ESPN2	No. 24	at Clemson	L 75–80	20–9 (9–7)	17 – Wooley	7 – Hadley	4 – Brown Jr.	Littlejohn Coliseum (8,084); Clemson, SC
March 3, 2026; 9:00 p.m., ACCN		Syracuse	W 77–62	21–9 (10–7)	23 – Conwell	7 – Tied	3 – Tied	KFC Yum! Center (15,306); Louisville, KY
March 7, 2026; 2:00 p.m., ESPNU		at No. 22 Miami	W 92–89	22–9 (11–7)	24 – Conwell	4 – Tied	6 – Wooley	Watsco Center (7,972); Coral Gables
ACC tournament
March 11, 2026; 2:30 p.m., ESPN	(6) No. 24	vs. (11) SMU; Second round	W 62–58	23–9	16 – Conwell	7 – McKneely	5 – McKneely	Spectrum Center (8,116); Charlotte, NC
March 12, 2026; 2:30 p.m., ESPN2	(6) No. 24	vs. (3) Miami; Quarterfinal	L 73–78	23–10	22 – Conwell	9 – Conwell	4 – Wooley	Spectrum Center (11,722); Charlotte, NC
NCAA tournament
March 19, 2026*; 1:30 p.m., TNT	(6 E) No. 23т	vs. (11 E) South Florida; First round	W 83–79	24–10	23 – McKneely	10 – Fru	6 – Conwell	KeyBank Center (17,182); Buffalo, NY
March 21, 2026*; 2:45 p.m., CBS	(6 E) No. 23т	vs. (3 E) No. 11 Michigan State; Second round	L 69–77	24–11	21 – Conwell	6 – Fru	4 – Tied	KeyBank Center (17,499); Buffalo, NY
*Non-conference game. ^{#}Rankings from AP Poll. (#) Tournament seedings in parentheses. E=East. All times are in Eastern Time.

Schedule Source:

== Rankings ==
Ranking movements Legend: ██ Increase in ranking ██ Decrease in ranking RV = Received votes т = Tied with team above or below
	Week																				
Poll	Pre	1	2	3	4	5	6	7	8	9	10	11	12	13	14	15	16	17	18	19	Final
AP	11	12	6	6	6	11	11	16	16	20	20	23	20	24	24	21	24	RV	24	23	23
Coaches	10	12	6т	5	6	11	11	14	13т	18	19	21	20	23	23	21	20	RV	24	24	23

== Awards and honors ==
ACC Player of the Week
Week	Date	Player	Position	Ref.
Week 2	November 17, 2025	Mikel Brown Jr.	Guard	
Week 15	February 16, 2026	Mikel Brown Jr.	Guard	

ACC Rookie of the Week
Week	Date	Player	Position	Ref.
Week 2	November 17, 2025	Mikel Brown Jr.	Guard	
Week 15	February 16, 2026	Mikel Brown Jr.	Guard	
