= 2025–26 California Golden Bears men's basketball team =

American college basketball season

2025–26 California Golden Bears men's basketball

NIT, Second Round
- Conference: Atlantic Coast Conference
- Record: 22–12 (9–9 ACC)
- Head coach: Mark Madsen (3rd season)
- Associate head coach: Adam Mazarei
- Assistant coaches: Jarred Jackson; Ken Moses; Matt Scherbenske; Isaiah Wilkins
- Home arena: Haas Pavilion (Capacity: 11,858)

2025–26 ACC men's basketball standings
	Conf.				Overall
Team	W		L	PCT	W		L	PCT
No. 4 Duke †	17	–	1	.944	35	–	3	.921
No. 17 Virginia	15	–	3	.833	30	–	6	.833
No. 24 Miami (FL)	13	–	5	.722	26	–	9	.743
North Carolina	12	–	6	.667	24	–	9	.727
Clemson	12	–	6	.667	24	–	11	.686
No. 23 Louisville	11	–	7	.611	24	–	11	.686
NC State	10	–	8	.556	20	–	14	.588
Florida State	10	–	8	.556	18	–	15	.545
California	9	–	9	.500	22	–	12	.647
Stanford	9	–	9	.500	20	–	13	.606
SMU	8	–	10	.444	20	–	14	.588
Virginia Tech	8	–	10	.444	19	–	13	.594
Wake Forest	7	–	11	.389	18	–	17	.514
Syracuse	6	–	12	.333	15	–	17	.469
Pittsburgh	5	–	13	.278	13	–	20	.394
Notre Dame	4	–	14	.222	13	–	18	.419
Boston College	4	–	14	.222	11	–	20	.355
Georgia Tech	2	–	16	.111	11	–	20	.355
† 2026 ACC tournament winner Rankings from AP Poll

The 2025–26 California Golden Bears men's basketball team represented the University of California, Berkeley, in the 2025–26 NCAA Division I men's basketball season. The Golden Bears were led by Mark Madsen in his third season as head coach, and played their home games at Haas Pavilion as members of the Atlantic Coast Conference.

The Golden Bears started the season with three straight wins before the streak was broken at Kansas State in a 96–99 loss. The team defeated Presbyterian and Sacramento State in the Empire Classic campus games. They traveled to the Chase Center to complete the Empire Classic with a win over eighteenth-ranked UCLA. They did not participate in the ACC–SEC Challenge, and won the remainder of their non-conference games. They faced only one other Power-4 team over their final six non-conference games, Utah, whom they defeated 79–72. Cal faced a significatnly harder schedule to being their ACC slate, facing three ranked teams in their first five games. The Golden Bears went 1–4 over this stretchm, and lost to sixth-ranked Duke, sixteenth-ranked Louisville, and twenty-third ranked Virginia. Their lone victory was a one-point defeat of Notre Dame. The team flipped the script and went 4–1 over their next five games, with victories over fourteenth-ranked North Carolina, and a rivalry victory over Stanford. Their only loss was a two-point defeat at Florida State. The Golden Bears went 3–2 in their next five games, losing to twentieth-ranked Clemson and Syracuse in double overtime. They defeated Stanford in a rivalry rematch over this stretch. They finished the season on a 1–2 streak, losing to Pittsburgh and Wake Forest but defeating Georgia Tech.

The Golden Bears finished the season 22–12 and 9–9 in ACC play to finish in a tie for ninth place. As the ninth seed in the 2026 ACC tournament, they lost to Florida State 89–95 in the First Round. They were exempt qualifiers in the NIT and were the second-seed in the Albuquerque Regional. They defeated UIC in the first Rrund before being upset by unseeded Saint Joseph's in the second round to end their season.

== Previous season ==
The Golden Bears finished the season 14–19 and 6–14 in ACC play to finish in fifteenth place. As the fifteenth seed in the 2025 ACC tournament, they defeated Virginia Tech in double-overtime in the First Round. In the Second Round, they faced rival Stanford for a third time during the season. They lost 78–73, to lose to their rivals three total times during the season. They were not invited to the NCAA tournament or the NIT.

== Off-season ==
=== Departures ===
Departures
Name	Number	Pos.	Height	Weight	Year	Hometown	Reason for departure
Jeremiah Wilkinson	0	G	6'1"	175	Freshman	Powder Springs, Georgia	Transferred to Georgia
Joshua Ola-Joseph	1	G	6'7"	215	Junior	Brooklyn Park, Minnesota	Transferred to Loyola-Chicago
Andrej Stojaković	2	G	6'7"	205	Sophomore	Carmichael, California	Transferred to Illinois
Spencer Mahoney	7	F	6'9"	230	(redshirt) Freshman	New York, New York	Transferred to Temple
Jovan Blacksher Jr.	10	G	5'11"	165	Graduate student	Los Angeles, California	Graduated
Mady Sissoko	12	C	6'9"	250	Graduate student	Bafoulabé, Mali	Graduated, signed with Pallacanestro Trieste
Devin Curtis	13	F	6'11"	210	Sophomore	Northridge, California	Transferred to Southern Indiana
Jack McCloskey	14	G	6'4"	180	Sophomore	Santa Ana, California	—
Kevin Armstrong II	15	G	6'6"	210	Freshman	Minneapolis, Minnesota	—
Jaden Goodall	17	F	6'6"	175	Freshman	Anaheim, California	Transferred to San Jose State
BJ Omot	20	F	6'8"	185	Junior	Mankato, Minnesota	Transferred to Minnesota
Christian Tucker	22	G	6'3"	178	Senior	Chandler, Arizona	Entered transfer portal
Matt Desler	23	G	6'1"	180	Senior	Oakland, California	Graduated
Jayden Karapetian	32	G	6'2"	170	Sophomore	Woodland Hills, California	—
Vladimir Pavlovic	33	G	6'3"	190	Sophomore	Herceg Novi, Montenegro	Transferred to Mercyhurst

=== Incoming transfers ===
Incoming transfers
Name	Number	Pos.	Height	Weight	Year	Hometown	Previous school
John Camden	2	F	6'8"	220	Graduate student	Downingtown, Pennsylvania	Delaware
Dai Dai Ames	7	G	6'2"	180	Junior	Chicago, Illinois	Virginia
Milos Ilic	8	C	6'10"	240	Graduate student	Gornji Milanovac, Serbia	Loyola (MD)
Justin Pippen	10	G	6'3"	190	Sophomore	Los Angeles, California	Michigan
Dhiaukuei Manyiel Dut	12	F	7'0"	210	(redshirt) Sophomore	Rumbek, South Sudan	Georgia State
Mantas Kocanas	17	C	6'11"	240	Sophomore	Karčiupis, Lithuania	Florida Atlantic
Nolan Dorsey	21	G	6'5"	210	Graduate student	Knightdale, North Carolina	Campbell
Chris Bell	22	F	6'7"	195	Senior	Concord, California	Syracuse
Sammie Yeanay	23	F	6'8"	240	Sophomore	Gainesville, Florida	Grand Canyon

=== 2025 recruiting class ===
College recruiting
Name	Hometown	School	Height	Weight	Commit date
Luke Butler; G	Austin, Texas	Westlake High School	6 ft 4 in (1.93 m)	180 lb (82 kg)	
Luke Butler; G	Recruit ratings: Scout: Rivals: 247Sports: ESPN: (NR)				
Semetri Carr; G	Mill Valley, California	Redwood High School	6 ft 0 in (1.83 m)	170 lb (77 kg)	Sep 14, 2024
Semetri Carr; G	Recruit ratings: Scout: Rivals: 247Sports: ESPN: (82)				
Jorell Clark; G	Palo Alto, California	Palo Alto High School	6 ft 2 in (1.88 m)	180 lb (82 kg)	
Jorell Clark; G	Recruit ratings: Scout: Rivals: 247Sports: ESPN: (NR)				
Jovani Ruff; G	Long Beach, California	Long Beach Poly	6 ft 5 in (1.96 m)	205 lb (93 kg)	Jun 5, 2024
Jovani Ruff; G	Recruit ratings: Scout: Rivals: 247Sports: ESPN: (81)				
Overall recruit ranking: Scout: 54 Rivals: 87 ESPN: NR
Note: In many cases, Scout, Rivals, 247Sports, On3, and ESPN may conflict in their listings of height and weight.; In these cases, the average was taken. ESPN grades are on a 100-point scale.; Sources: "California Golden Bears". Rivals.; "California Golden Bears". ESPN.; "2025 Team Ranking". Rivals.

== Roster ==
2025–26 California Golden Bears men's basketball team
Players
Coaches

Pos.	#	Name	Height	Weight	Year	Previous school	Hometown
G	0	Jovani Ruff	6 ft 5 in (1.96 m)	205 lb (93 kg)	Fr	Long Beach Poly	Long Beach, CA
G	1	Dejuan Campbell	6 ft 2 in (1.88 m)	205 lb (93 kg)	Sr	Kecoughtan High School; Western Carolina	Hampton, VA
F	2	John Camden	6 ft 8 in (2.03 m)	220 lb (100 kg)	GS	Brewster Academy; Delaware	Downingtown, PA
G	3	Semetri Carr	6 ft 0 in (1.83 m)	170 lb (77 kg)	Fr	Redwood High School	Mill Valley, CA
G	6	Jorell Clark	6 ft 2 in (1.88 m)	180 lb (82 kg)	Fr	Palo Alto High School	Palo Alto, CA
G	7	Dai Dai Ames	6 ft 2 in (1.88 m)	190 lb (86 kg)	Jr	Kenwood Academy; Virginia	Chicago, IL
C	8	Milos Ilic	6 ft 10 in (2.08 m)	240 lb (109 kg)	GS	Hoosac School; Loyola (MD)	Gornji Milanovac, Serbia
G	10	Justin Pippen	6 ft 3 in (1.91 m)	190 lb (86 kg)	So	Sierra Canyon School; Michigan	Los Angeles, CA
F	12	Dhiaukuei Manyiel Dut	7 ft 0 in (2.13 m)	210 lb (95 kg)	RS So	Greenforest McCalep Christian Academy; Georgia State	Rumbek, South Sudan
G	15	Luke Butler	6 ft 4 in (1.93 m)	180 lb (82 kg)	Fr	Westlake High School	Austin, TX
C	17	Mantas Kocanas	6 ft 11 in (2.11 m)	240 lb (109 kg)	So	Varpo Gymnasium; Florida Atlantic	Karčiupis, Lithuania
G	21	Nolan Dorsey	6 ft 5 in (1.96 m)	210 lb (95 kg)	GS	Millbrook High School; Campbell	Knightdale, NC
F	22	Chris Bell	6 ft 7 in (2.01 m)	195 lb (88 kg)	Sr	Wasatch Academy; Syracuse	Concord, CA
F	23	Sammie Yeanay	6 ft 8 in (2.03 m)	240 lb (109 kg)	So	AZ Compass Prep School; Grand Canyon	Gainesville, FL
G	26	BJ Fisher	6 ft 1 in (1.85 m)	180 lb (82 kg)	So	Redwood High School	Ross, CA
G	30	Stephon Marbury II	6 ft 1 in (1.85 m)	170 lb (77 kg)	Fr	DME Academy	Purchase, NY
F	31	Rytis Petraitis	6 ft 7 in (2.01 m)	215 lb (98 kg)	Jr	USAFA Prep School; Air Force	Arlington, TX
F	34	Lee Dort	6 ft 10 in (2.08 m)	235 lb (107 kg)	Sr	Greenhill School; Vanderbilt	Dallas, TX

Head coach

- Mark Madsen (Stanford)

Assistant coach(es)

- Adam Mazarei (Redlands)
- Jarred Jackson (Lander)
- Ken Moses (CSU Pueblo)
- Matt Scherbenske (Kentucky)
- Isaiah Wilkins (Virginia)

Legend

- (C) Team captain
- (S) Suspended
- (I) Ineligible
- (W) Walk-on
- Injured
- Current redshirt

Roster
Last update: September 15, 2025

== Schedule and results ==
On December 2, 2025, a 79–72 victory against Utah resulted in the school's first 7–1 start since the 2016–17 Bears team. The December 13 victory over Northwestern State gave Cal its first 10–1 start since the 2014–15 team. The December 21 victory over Columbia gave Cal its first 12–1 start since the 1959–60 team that entered the 1960 NCAA University Division basketball tournament with one loss and were national runner-up. Although the team had been ranked 16th of 18 in the preseason polls, after the 12-1 start, the team was expected to win over 20 games before the 2026 ACC men's basketball tournament. The team won 20 games for the first time since the 2016–17 Bears went 21–13, and it won 20 regular season games for the first time since the 2015–16 Bears went 23–11.

Date time, TV	Rank^{#}	Opponent^{#}	Result	Record	High points	High rebounds	High assists	Site (attendance) city, state
Non-conference regular season
November 3, 2025*; 7:00 p.m., ACCNX		Cal State Bakersfield	W 87–60	1–0	22 – Camden	9 – Dort	7 – Pippen	Haas Pavilion (3,143); Berkeley, CA
November 6, 2025*; 7:00 p.m., ACCNX		Wright State	W 77–67	2–0	23 – Ames	9 – Tied	4 – Pippen	Haas Pavilion (2,172); Berkeley, CA
November 10, 2025*; 7:00 p.m., ACCNX		Cal State Fullerton	W 93–65	3–0	24 – Ames	9 – Pippen	6 – Pippen	Haas Pavilion (2,377); Berkeley, CA
November 13, 2025*; 6:00 p.m., CBSSN		at Kansas State	L 96–99	3–1	27 – Bell	6 – Carr	7 – Ames	Bramlage Coliseum (7,521); Manhattan, KS
November 18, 2025*; 7:00 p.m., ACCNX		Presbyterian; Empire Classic campus game	W 67–57	4–1	20 – Camden	8 – Dort	6 – Pippen	Haas Pavilion (1,894); Berkeley, CA
November 21, 2025*; 7:00 p.m., ACCNX		Sacramento State; Empire Classic campus game	W 91–67	5–1	21 – Bell	9 – Ilic	5 – Tied	Haas Pavilion (4,295); Berkeley, CA
November 25, 2025*; 7:00 p.m., ESPN		vs. No. 18 UCLA; Empire Classic	W 80–72	6–1	22 – Bell	7 – Petraitis	4 – Tied	Chase Center (7,293); San Francisco, CA
December 2, 2025*; 7:00 p.m., ACCNX		Utah	W 79–72	7–1	25 – Ames	11 – Dort	3 – Dort	Haas Pavilion (2,783); Berkeley, CA
December 6, 2025*; 2:00 p.m., ACCNX		Pacific	W 67–61	8–1	16 – Pippen	7 – Tied	3 – Carr	Haas Pavilion (2,688); Berkeley, CA
December 9, 2025*; 7:00 p.m., ACCNX		Dominican (CA)	W 93–71	9–1	24 – Pippen	8 – Camden	5 – Ames	Haas Pavilion (1,844); Berkeley, CA
December 13, 2025*; 2:00 p.m., ACCNX		Northwestern State	W 79–70	10–1	25 – Camden	13 – Dort	7 – Carr	Haas Pavilion (2,738); Berkeley, CA
December 19, 2025*; 7:00 p.m., ACCNX		Morgan State	W 97–50	11–1	28 – Bell	8 – Camden	9 – Carr	Haas Pavilion (1,894); Berkeley, CA
December 21, 2025*; 2:00 p.m., ACCNX		Columbia	W 74–56	12–1	21 – Ames	14 – Dort	5 – Pippen	Haas Pavilion (3,283); Berkeley, CA
ACC regular season
December 30, 2025; 6:00 p.m., ACCN		No. 16 Louisville	L 70–90	12–2 (0–1)	20 – Bell	9 – Dort	5 – Pippen	Haas Pavilion (6,012); Berkeley, CA
January 2, 2026; 8:00 p.m., ESPN2		Notre Dame	W 72–71	13–2 (1–1)	23 – Ames	11 – Dort	3 – Tied	Haas Pavilion (5,158); Berkeley, CA
January 7, 2026; 6:00 p.m., ACCN		at No. 23 Virginia	L 60–84	13–3 (1–2)	18 – Ames	8 – Carr	3 – Pippen	John Paul Jones Arena (11,533); Charlottesville, VA
January 10, 2026; 1:00 p.m., ACCN		at Virginia Tech	L 75–78	13–4 (1–3)	21 – Ames	7 – Dort	4 – Ilic	Cassell Coliseum (5,323); Blacksburg, VA
January 14, 2026; 8:00 p.m., ACCN		No. 6 Duke	L 56–71	13–5 (1–4)	14 – Dort	9 – Dort	3 – Tied	Haas Pavilion (11,201); Berkeley, CA
January 17, 2026; 1:00 p.m., ACCN		No. 14 North Carolina	W 84–78	14–5 (2–4)	20 – Camden	12 – Dort	5 – Pippen	Haas Pavilion (8,077); Berkeley, CA
January 24, 2026; 5:00 p.m., ACCN		at Stanford; Rivalry	W 78–66	15–5 (3–4)	25 – Camden	10 – Camden	6 – Pippen	Maples Pavilion (7,291); Stanford, CA
January 28, 2026; 4:00 p.m., ACCN		at Florida State	L 61–63	15–6 (3–5)	19 – Pippen	11 – Ilic	3 – Pippen	Donald L. Tucker Center (4,867); Tallahassee, FL
January 31, 2026; 1:00 p.m., ACCN		at Miami	W 86–85	16–6 (4–5)	26 – Camden	4 – Pippen	8 – Pippen	Watsco Center (6,513); Coral Gables, FL
February 4, 2026; 5:00 p.m., ACCN		Georgia Tech	W 90–85	17–6 (5–5)	29 – Ames	9 – Ilic	6 – Pippen	Haas Pavilion (6,018); Berkeley, CA
February 7, 2026; 5:00 p.m., ACCN		No. 20 Clemson	L 55–77	17–7 (5–6)	19 – Pippen	5 – Tied	2 – Tied	Haas Pavilion (5,629); Berkeley, CA
February 11, 2026; 4:00 p.m., ESPNU		at Syracuse	L 100–107 ^{2OT}	17–8 (5–7)	23 – Ames	14 – Ilic	7 – Pippen	JMA Wireless Dome (19,053); Syracuse, NY
February 14, 2026; 9:00 a.m., ACCN		at Boston College	W 86–75	18–8 (6–7)	22 – Bell	9 – Camden	4 – Tied	Conte Forum (3,485); Chestnut Hill, MA
February 21, 2026; 3:00 p.m., ACCN		Stanford; Rivalry	W 72–66	19–8 (7–7)	20 – Bell	8 – Camden	4 – Pippen	Haas Pavilion (9,020); Berkeley, CA
February 25, 2026; 7:00 p.m., ACCN		SMU	W 73–69	20–8 (8–7)	24 – Pippen	10 – Dort	5 – Pippen	Haas Pavilion (4,411); Berkeley, CA
February 28, 2026; 1:00 p.m., ACCN		Pittsburgh	L 56–72	20–9 (8–8)	11 – Ames	9 – Ilic	4 – Tied	Haas Pavilion (5,061); Berkeley, CA
March 4, 2026; 4:00 p.m., ESPNU		at Georgia Tech	W 76–65	21–9 (9–8)	18 – Ames	10 – Camden	8 – Pippen	McCamish Pavilion (4,124); Atlanta, GA
March 7, 2026; 1:00 p.m., ACCN		at Wake Forest	L 73–80	21–10 (9–9)	31 – Ames	7 – Dort	3 – Pippen	LJVM Coliseum (8,514); Winston-Salem, NC
ACC tournament
March 11, 2026; 4:00 p.m., ESPN2	(9)	vs. (8) Florida State; Second Round	L 89–95	21–11	27 – Ames	18 – Dort	6 – Pippen	Spectrum Center (9,620); Charlotte, NC
NIT
March 18, 2026*; 8:00 p.m., ESPN2	(2 AL)	UIC; First Round	W 91–73	22–11	31 – Bell	7 – Ilić	7 – Carr	Haas Pavilion (1,258); Berkeley, CA
March 22, 2026*; 6:00 p.m., ESPNU	(2 AL)	Saint Joseph's; Second Round	L 75–76	22–12	23 – Bell	8 – Dort	6 – Pippen	Haas Pavilion (1,657); Berkeley, CA
*Non-conference game. ^{#}Rankings from AP Poll. (#) Tournament seedings in parentheses. AL=Alberquerque. All times are in Pacific Time.
