= Dai Dai (disambiguation) =

"Dai Dai" is a song by Colombian singer Shakira and Nigerian singer Burna Boy selected as the official song for the 2026 FIFA World Cup.

Dai Dai may also refer to:

- Dai Dai Ames (born 2005), American basketball player
- Dai Dai N'tab (born 1994), Dutch speed skater
- Dai dai shogi, Japanese board game

== See also ==
- Daidai, Asian fruit
