= 2025–26 North Carolina Tar Heels men's basketball team =

American college basketball season

2025–26 North Carolina Tar Heels men's basketball

NCAA tournament, First round
- Conference: Atlantic Coast Conference
- Record: 24–9 (12–6 ACC)
- Head coach: Hubert Davis (5th season)
- Assistant coaches: Jeff Lebo (5th season); Sean May (5th season); Brad Frederick (9th season); Pat Sullivan (5th season); Marcus Paige (3rd season)
- Home arena: Dean E. Smith Center

2025–26 ACC men's basketball standings
	Conf.				Overall
Team	W		L	PCT	W		L	PCT
No. 4 Duke †	17	–	1	.944	35	–	3	.921
No. 17 Virginia	15	–	3	.833	30	–	6	.833
No. 24 Miami (FL)	13	–	5	.722	26	–	9	.743
North Carolina	12	–	6	.667	24	–	9	.727
Clemson	12	–	6	.667	24	–	11	.686
No. 23 Louisville	11	–	7	.611	24	–	11	.686
NC State	10	–	8	.556	20	–	14	.588
Florida State	10	–	8	.556	18	–	15	.545
California	9	–	9	.500	22	–	12	.647
Stanford	9	–	9	.500	20	–	13	.606
SMU	8	–	10	.444	20	–	14	.588
Virginia Tech	8	–	10	.444	19	–	13	.594
Wake Forest	7	–	11	.389	18	–	17	.514
Syracuse	6	–	12	.333	15	–	17	.469
Pittsburgh	5	–	13	.278	13	–	20	.394
Notre Dame	4	–	14	.222	13	–	18	.419
Boston College	4	–	14	.222	11	–	20	.355
Georgia Tech	2	–	16	.111	11	–	20	.355
† 2026 ACC tournament winner Rankings from AP Poll

The 2025–26 North Carolina Tar Heels men's basketball team represented the University of North Carolina at Chapel Hill for the 2025–26 NCAA Division I men's basketball season. The team was led by coach Hubert Davis in his fifth and final season as UNC's head coach, and was assisted by Jeff Lebo, Sean May, and Brad Frederick. The Tar Heels played their home games at the Dean Smith Center in Chapel Hill, North Carolina, as members of the Atlantic Coast Conference (ACC).

The Tar Heels began the season ranked twenty-fifth in the AP poll and won their first five games in a row. The highlight of the winning streak was a 87–74 victory over nineteenth-ranked Kansas. The team then traveled to Fort Myers, Florida to participate in the Fort Myers Tip-Off. They extended their winning streak to six games with a defeat of St. Bonaventure, but it ended there with a loss to eleventh-ranked Michigan State. The Tar Heels rose to sixteenth in the AP poll over the streak. The team defeated rivals, eighteenth-ranked Kentucky after the loss in the ACC–SEC Challenge. They went on to win their remaining five non-conference games to finish non-conference play with a record of 12–1 and ranked twelfth. They only faced one further Power-4 opponent over this run, Ohio State in the CBS Sports Classic. The Tar Heels began conference play on a 2–3 run which saw them fall to twenty-second in the AP poll. They defeated Florida State to start ACC play and rivals Wake Forest over the stretch but lost road games against SMU, Stanford, and California. The team turned it around and went 5–0 in their next five games. They defeated fourteenth-ranked Virginia on the road and fourth-ranked rivals Duke to rise to eleventh in the rankings. They went 3–2 over their next five games, losing at Miami and at rivals NC State. They defeated twenty-fourth ranked Louisville by three points during this stretch. They finished the season by defeating Virginia Tech and Clemson but losing to top-ranked Duke on the final day of the regular season.

The Tar Heels finished the season 24–9 overall and 12–6 in ACC play to finish in a tie for fourth place. As the fourth seed in the 2026 ACC tournament, they earned a double-bye to the quarterfinals, where they were defeated Clemson by a point. The team earned an at-large bid to the NCAA tournament and were the six-seed in the South region. They were upset by eleven-seed VCU in overtime in the first round after being up by as many as nineteen points in the second half. After the loss, head coach Hubert Davis was fired.

== Previous season ==
The Tar Heels finished the 2024–25 season with a 23–14 overall record, with a 13–7 mark in the ACC, tying for 4th in the league. The team faced many ups and downs, starting with a tough non-conference schedule facing teams like Kansas, Auburn, Michigan State, Alabama, and Florida. The Heels showed flashes when rallying from a 21‑point second‑half deficit to defeat Dayton in the Maui Invitational, and overcame a 16-point hole vs. UCLA in the CBS Sports Classic.

As the No. 5 seed in the ACC Tournament, they defeated Notre Dame in the second round, Wake Forest in the quarterfinals, and fell short in a comeback bid against Duke in the semifinals. UNC earned an at-large bid to the NCAA Tournament as an 11 seed in the South Region, starting their tournament in Dayton at the First Four. They routed San Diego State 95–68 to advance to the round of 64, but their run ended there with a 71–64 loss to Ole Miss.

== Offseason ==
The Tar Heels lost virtually their entire core, including all five starters from the 2024–25 season. Among the most notable departures were veteran guard RJ Davis and forward Jae'Lyn Withers, both of whom graduated. Numerous players entered the transfer portal, including Elliot Cadeau, Ian Jackson, Jalen Washington, and Ven-Allen Lubin. Freshman Drake Powell decided to enter the 2025 NBA Draft. The only main rotation player that announced he would be returning was guard Seth Trimble.

UNC aggressively rebuilt its roster through the transfer portal, international signings, and high school recruits. The additions were led by several transfers, including 7-footer Henri Veesaar from Arizona, forward Jarin Stevenson from Alabama, and guard Kyan Evans from Colorado State. They also brought in wing shooter Jonathan Powell from West Virginia, and international guard Luka Bogavac from Montenegro. They also added incoming freshmen, most notably five-star forward Caleb Wilson, along with guards Derek Dixon and Isiah Denis.

=== Departures ===
North Carolina departures
Name	Number	Pos.	Height	Weight	Year	Hometown	Reason for departure
R.J. Davis	4	G	6'0"	180	Graduate student	White Plains, New York	Graduated
Jae'Lyn Withers	24	F	6'9"	220	Graduate student	Charlotte, North Carolina	Graduated
Cade Tyson	5	G/F	6'7"	200	Junior	Monroe, North Carolina	Transferred to Minnesota
Jalen Washington	13	F	6'10"	235	Junior	Gary, Indiana	Transferred to Vanderbilt
Ven-Allen Lubin	22	F	6'8"	230	Junior	Orlando, Florida	Transferred to NC State
Elliot Cadeau	3	G	6'1"	180	Sophomore	West Orange, New Jersey	Transferred to Michigan
Drake Powell	9	G/F	6'6"	195	Freshman	Pittsboro, North Carolina	Declared for the 2025 NBA draft, selected 22nd overall by the Atlanta Hawks, traded to the Brooklyn Nets
Ian Jackson	11	G	6'4"	190	Freshman	The Bronx, New York	Transferred to St. John's

=== Additions ===
==== Incoming transfers ====
incoming transfers
Name	Number	Pos.	Height	Weight	Year	Hometown	Previous school
Kyan Evans	0	G	6'2"	175	Junior	Kansas City, Missouri	Colorado State
Luka Bogavac	44	G	6'6"	215	Junior	Mojkovac, Montenegro	SC Derby
Henri Veesaar	13	C	7'0"	225	Junior	Tallinn, Estonia	Arizona
Jarin Stevenson	15	F	6'10"	215	Junior	Chapel Hill, North Carolina	Alabama
Jaydon Young	4	G	6'4"	200	Junior	Goldsboro, North Carolina	Virginia Tech
Jonathan Powell	11	G	6'6"	190	Sophomore	Centerville, Ohio	West Virginia
Ivan Matlekovic	40	C	7'0"	255	Sophomore	Sisak, Croatia	High Point

==== Recruiting class ====
College recruiting
Name	Hometown	School	Height	Weight	Commit date
Caleb Wilson; F	Atlanta, Georgia	Holy Innocents' Episcopal School	6 ft 10 in (2.08 m)	215 lb (98 kg)	Jan 24, 2025
Caleb Wilson; F	Recruit ratings: Rivals: 247Sports: ESPN: (96)				
Derek Dixon; G	Vienna, Virginia	Gonzaga College High School	6 ft 5 in (1.96 m)	200 lb (91 kg)	Sep 27, 2024
Derek Dixon; G	Recruit ratings: Rivals: 247Sports: ESPN: (85)				
Isaiah Denis; G	Charlotte, North Carolina	Davidson Day School	6 ft 4 in (1.93 m)	180 lb (82 kg)	Nov 2, 2024
Isaiah Denis; G	Recruit ratings: Rivals: 247Sports: ESPN: (85)				
Overall recruit ranking: 247Sports: 7
Note: In many cases, Scout, Rivals, 247Sports, On3, and ESPN may conflict in their listings of height and weight.; In these cases, the average was taken. ESPN grades are on a 100-point scale.; Sources: "North Carolina 2025 Basketball Commitments". Rivals.; "2025 North Carolina Tar Heels Recruiting Class". ESPN.; "2025 Team Ranking". Rivals.

== Roster ==
2025–26 North Carolina Tar Heels men's basketball team
Players
Coaches

Pos.	#	Name	Height	Weight	Year	Previous school	Hometown
G	0	Kyan Evans	6 ft 2 in (1.88 m)	175 lb (79 kg)	Jr	Staley / Colorado State	St. Louis, MO
F	1	Zayden High	6 ft 10 in (2.08 m)	230 lb (104 kg)	So	AZ Compass Prep	San Antonio, TX
F	2	James Brown	6 ft 10 in (2.08 m)	240 lb (109 kg)	So	Link Academy	Aurora, IL
G	3	Derek Dixon	6 ft 5 in (1.96 m)	200 lb (91 kg)	Fr	Gonzaga College HS	Vienna, VA
G	4	Jaydon Young	6 ft 4 in (1.93 m)	200 lb (91 kg)	Jr	Greensboro Day / Virginia Tech	Greensboro, NC
G	5	Isaiah Denis	6 ft 4 in (1.93 m)	180 lb (82 kg)	Fr	Davidson Day	Charlotte, NC
G	6	Elijah Davis (W)	6 ft 3 in (1.91 m)	205 lb (93 kg)	Sr	Lynchburg	Chapel Hill, NC
G	7	Seth Trimble	6 ft 3 in (1.91 m)	200 lb (91 kg)	Sr	Menomonee Falls	Menomonee Falls, WI
F	8	Caleb Wilson	6 ft 10 in (2.08 m)	215 lb (98 kg)	Fr	Holy Innocents Episcopal School	Atlanta, GA
G	11	Jonathan Powell	6 ft 6 in (1.98 m)	190 lb (86 kg)	So	Centerville / West Virginia	Centerville, OH
C	13	Henri Veesaar	7 ft 0 in (2.13 m)	225 lb (102 kg)	Jr	Real Madrid / Arizona	Tallinn, Estonia
F	15	Jarin Stevenson	6 ft 10 in (2.08 m)	215 lb (98 kg)	Jr	Seaforth / Alabama	Chapel Hill, NC
F	25	John Holbrook (W)	6 ft 8 in (2.03 m)	230 lb (104 kg)	So	Hickory	Hickory, NC
G	32	Evan Smith Jr. (W)	6 ft 1 in (1.85 m)	195 lb (88 kg)	Jr	Ardrey Kell	Charlotte, NC
C	40	Ivan Matleković	7 ft 0 in (2.13 m)	255 lb (116 kg)	So	HAKK Mladost / High Point	Sisak, Croatia
G	44	Luka Bogavac	6 ft 6 in (1.98 m)	215 lb (98 kg)	Jr	SC Derby	Mojkovac, Montenegro

Head coach

- Hubert Davis (North Carolina)

Assistant coach(es)

- Jeff Lebo (North Carolina)
- Sean May (North Carolina)
- Brad Frederick (North Carolina)
- Pat Sullivan (North Carolina)
- Marcus Paige (North Carolina)

Legend

- (C) Team captain
- (S) Suspended
- (I) Ineligible
- (W) Walk-on
- Injured
- Current redshirt

Roster
Last update: October 15, 2025

== Schedule and results ==
Date time, TV	Rank^{#}	Opponent^{#}	Result	Record	High points	High rebounds	High assists	Site (attendance) city, state
Exhibition
October 24, 2025*; 9:00 p.m., ESPN+	No. 25	vs. No. 8 BYU; The Bad Boy Mowers Series - Salt Lake City	L 76–78	–	22 – Wilson	10 – Wilson	5 – Evans	Delta Center (9,030); Salt Lake City, UT
October 29, 2025*; 7:30 p.m., ACCNX	No. 25	Winston-Salem State	W 95–53	–	23 – Wilson	10 – Wilson	3 – High	Dean Smith Center (15,332); Chapel Hill, NC
Non-conference regular season
November 3, 2025*; 7:00 p.m., ACCN	No. 25	Central Arkansas	W 94–54	1–0	22 – Wilson	10 – Veesaar	5 – Tied	Dean Smith Center (16,079); Chapel Hill, NC
November 7, 2025*; 7:00 p.m., ESPN	No. 25	No. 19 Kansas	W 87–74	2–0	24 – Wilson	8 – Trimble	4 – Tied	Dean Smith Center (21,750); Chapel Hill, NC
November 11, 2025*; 7:00 p.m., ACCN	No. 18	Radford	W 89–74	3–0	19 – Bogavac	14 – Wilson	5 – Tied	Dean Smith Center (16,613); Chapel Hill, NC
November 14, 2025*; 9:00 p.m., ACCN	No. 18	North Carolina Central	W 97–53	4–0	21 – Wilson	13 – Wilson	7 – Evans	Dean Smith Center (17,522); Chapel Hill, NC
November 18, 2025*; 7:00 p.m., ACCN	No. 18	Navy	W 73–61	5–0	23 – Wilson	12 – Wilson	6 – Evans	Dean Smith Center (16,869); Chapel Hill, NC
November 25, 2025*; 6:00 p.m., FS1	No. 16	vs. St. Bonaventure; Fort Myers Tip-Off Beach Division	W 85–70	6–0	24 – Veesaar	13 – Veesaar	4 – Bogavac	Suncoast Credit Union Arena (3,500); Fort Myers, FL
November 27, 2025*; 4:30 p.m., FOX	No. 16	vs. No. 11 Michigan State; Fort Myers Tip-Off Beach Division	L 58–74	6–1	18 – Wilson	7 – Tied	5 – Bogavac	Suncoast Credit Union Arena (3,500); Fort Myers, FL
December 2, 2025*; 9:30 p.m., ESPN	No. 16	at No. 18 Kentucky; ACC–SEC Challenge / Rivalry	W 67–64	7–1	17 – Veesaar	12 – Wilson	6 – Wilson	Rupp Arena (20,029); Lexington, KY
December 7, 2025*; 5:00 p.m., ESPN	No. 16	Georgetown	W 81–61	8–1	20 – Wilson	15 – Veesaar	4 – Evans	Dean Smith Center (18,583); Chapel Hill, NC
December 13, 2025*; 2:00 p.m., The CW	No. 14	USC Upstate	W 80–62	9–1	20 – Wilson	11 – Wilson	5 – Tied	Dean Smith Center (17,759); Chapel Hill, NC
December 16, 2025*; 8:00 p.m., ACCN	No. 12	East Tennessee State	W 77–58	10–1	26 – Veesaar	8 – Tied	6 – Evans	Dean Smith Center (16,548); Chapel Hill, NC
December 20, 2025*; 3:00 p.m., CBS	No. 12	vs. Ohio State; CBS Sports Classic	W 71–70	11–1	20 – Wilson	15 – Wilson	5 – Veesaar	State Farm Arena (16,951); Atlanta, GA
December 22, 2025*; 8:00 p.m., ACCN	No. 12	East Carolina	W 99–51	12–1	21 – Wilson	12 – Wilson	5 – Trimble	Dean Smith Center (20,479); Chapel Hill, NC
ACC regular season
December 30, 2025; 7:00 p.m., ESPN2	No. 12	Florida State	W 79–66	13–1 (1–0)	22 – Wilson	16 – Wilson	6 – Wilson	Dean Smith Center (20,618); Chapel Hill, NC
January 3, 2026; 2:15 p.m., The CW	No. 12	at SMU	L 83–97	13–2 (1–1)	22 – Trimble	7 – Wilson	6 – Bogavac	Moody Coliseum (6,698); University Park, TX
January 10, 2026; 6:00 p.m., ACCN	No. 17	Wake Forest; Rivalry	W 87–84	14–2 (2–1)	25 – Veesaar	12 – Wilson	4 – Tied	Dean Smith Center (21,750); Chapel Hill, NC
January 14, 2026; 9:00 p.m., ACCN	No. 14	at Stanford	L 90–95	14–3 (2–2)	26 – Tied	9 – Wilson	2 – Tied	Maples Pavilion (5,369); Stanford, CA
January 17, 2026; 4:00 p.m., ACCN	No. 14	at California	L 78–84	14–4 (2–3)	17 – Wilson	10 – Veesaar	4 – Tied	Haas Pavilion (8,077); Berkeley, CA
January 21, 2026; 7:00 p.m., ESPN2	No. 22	Notre Dame	W 91–69	15–4 (3–3)	22 – Wilson	12 – Veesaar	5 – Wilson	Dean Smith Center (19,686); Chapel Hill, NC
January 24, 2026; 12:00 p.m., ESPN2	No. 22	at No. 14 Virginia	W 85–80	16–4 (4–3)	20 – Wilson	7 – Powell	7 – Dixon	John Paul Jones Arena (14,637); Charlottesville, VA
January 31, 2026; 2:00 p.m., ACCN	No. 16	at Georgia Tech	W 91–75	17–4 (5–3)	22 – Wilson	12 – Veesaar	5 – Wilson	McCamish Pavilion (8,700); Atlanta, GA
February 2, 2026; 7:00 p.m., ESPN	No. 14	Syracuse	W 87–77	18–4 (6–3)	22 – Wilson	11 – Veesaar	4 – Veesaar	Dean Smith Center (20,152); Chapel Hill, NC
February 7, 2026; 6:30 p.m., ESPN	No. 14	No. 4 Duke; Rivalry/College GameDay	W 71–68	19–4 (7–3)	23 – Wilson	11 – Veesaar	4 – Dixon	Dean Smith Center (21,750); Chapel Hill, NC
February 10, 2026; 7:00 p.m., ESPN	No. 11	at Miami	L 66–75	19–5 (7–4)	13 – Stevenson	6 – Tied	4 – Tied	Watsco Center (7,355); Coral Gables, FL
February 14, 2026; 2:00 p.m., ESPN	No. 11	Pittsburgh	W 79–65	20–5 (8–4)	19 – Tied	7 – Tied	7 – Dixon	Dean Smith Center (21,750); Chapel Hill, NC
February 17, 2026; 7:00 p.m., ESPN	No. 16	at NC State; Rivalry	L 58–82	20–6 (8–5)	13 – Tied	10 – High	3 – Evans	Lenovo Center (19,367); Raleigh, NC
February 21, 2026; 1:00 p.m., ABC	No. 16	at Syracuse	W 77–64	21–6 (9–5)	19 – Veesaar	11 – High	4 – Dixon	JMA Wireless Dome (23,606); Syracuse, NY
February 23, 2026; 7:00 p.m., ESPN	No. 18	No. 24 Louisville	W 77–74	22–6 (10–5)	30 – Trimble	7 – Stevenson	4 – Trimble	Dean Smith Center (20,577); Chapel Hill, NC
February 28, 2026; 8:30 p.m., ESPN2	No. 18	Virginia Tech	W 89–82	23–6 (11–5)	26 – Veesaar	7 – Veesaar	4 – Trimble	Dean Smith Center (21,750); Chapel Hill, NC
March 3, 2026; 7:00 p.m., ESPN	No. 17	Clemson	W 67–63	24–6 (12–5)	20 – Bogavac	10 – Stevenson	4 – Veesaar	Dean Smith Center (20,753); Chapel Hill, NC
March 7, 2026; 6:30 p.m., ESPN	No. 17	at No. 1 Duke; Rivalry/College GameDay	L 61–76	24–7 (12–6)	17 – Dixon	9 – Veesaar	6 – Trimble	Cameron Indoor Stadium (9,314); Durham, NC
ACC tournament
March 12, 2026; 9:30 p.m., ESPN	(4) No. 19	vs. (5) Clemson; Quarterfinal	L 79–80	24–8	28 – Veesaar	17 – Veesaar	8 – Trimble	Spectrum Center (17,627); Charlotte, NC
NCAA tournament
March 19, 2026; 3:10 p.m., truTV	(6 S) No. 21	vs. (11 S) VCU; First round	L 78–82 ^{OT}	24–9	26 – Veesaar	10 – Veesaar	6 – Tied	Bon Secours Wellness Arena (14,092); Greenville, SC
*Non-conference game. ^{#}Rankings from AP poll. (#) Tournament seedings in parentheses. S=South. All times are in Eastern Time.

== Rankings ==
Ranking movements Legend: ██ Increase in ranking ██ Decrease in ranking RV = Received votes
	Week																				
Poll	Pre	1	2	3	4	5	6	7	8	9	10	11	12	13	14	15	16	17	18	19	Final
AP	25	18	18	16	16	14	12	12	12	17	14	22	16	14	11	16	18	17	19	21	RV
Coaches	25	20	19	17	17	15	13	12	12	17	15	24	18	18	13	20	19	18	19	21	RV
