= Henri Veesaar =

Estonian basketball player (born 2004)

No. 13 – Atlanta Hawks
- Position: Center
- League: NBA

Personal information
- Born: 28 March 2004 (age 22) Tallinn, Estonia
- Listed height: 6 ft 11 in (2.11 m)
- Listed weight: 225 lb (102 kg)

Career information
- College: Arizona (2022–2025); North Carolina (2025–2026)
- NBA draft: 2026: 2nd round, 52nd overall pick
- Drafted by: Los Angeles Clippers
- Playing career: 2026–present

Career history
- 2026–present: Atlanta Hawks

Career highlights
- Second-team All-ACC (2026)
- Stats at NBA.com
- Stats at Basketball Reference

Henri Veesaar (born 28 March 2004) is an Estonian basketball player for the Atlanta Hawks of the National Basketball Association (NBA). He played college basketball player for the Arizona Wildcats and North Carolina Tar Heels. Listed at 2.13 m (7 ft 0 in) and 225 pounds (102.1 kg), he plays the center position.

== College career ==
On May 20, 2022, it was announced that Veesaar would leave Real Madrid youth team and would join Arizona to play college basketball. During his first season in Arizona, Veesaar received little playing time but showed promise in limited action. An injury to his elbow sidelined him for his entire sophomore campaign. After a long recovery period, Veesaar decided to redshirt for the 2023–24 season. During his last season in Arizona, he played in 37 games, averaging 9.4 points per game and became a key contributor to the team.

After spending three seasons in Arizona, Veesaar transferred to North Carolina Tar Heels of the Atlantic Coast Conference. Veesaar averaged 17.0 points, 8.7 rebounds, 2.1 assists, 1.5 steals and 1.4 blocks in 31.5 minutes per game and achieving 13 double doubles that season for North Carolina. He was also chosen to the 2026 All-ACC Second-team. After one season at North Carolina, Veesaar declared to enter 2026 NBA draft.

== Professional career ==
On June 24, 2026, Veesaar was selected with the 52nd overall pick by the Los Angeles Clippers in the 2026 NBA draft but was subsequently traded to the Atlanta Hawks. On July 1, Veesaar signed a four-year $9.3 million contract. On September 15, Veesaar tore his ACL at a workout prior to the start of the 2026–27 NBA season and is expected to miss most of the season.

== National team career ==
Veesaar made his debut for the Estonian national team when he was 17 years old against Iceland on 29 July 2021. He has also represented the Estonia national U-18 team.

== Career statistics ==
Legend
GP	Games played	GS	Games started	MPG	Minutes per game
FG%	Field goal percentage	3P%	3-point field goal percentage	FT%	Free throw percentage
RPG	Rebounds per game	APG	Assists per game	SPG	Steals per game
BPG	Blocks per game	PPG	Points per game	**Bold**	Career high

=== College ===
Year	Team	GP	GS	MPG	FG%	3P%	FT%	RPG	APG	SPG	BPG	PPG
2022–23	Arizona	29	0	7.1	**.619**	.273	**.714**	1.5	0.5	.1	.4	2.4
2023–24	Arizona	Redshirt										
2024–25	Arizona	**37**	5	20.8	.592	.327	.686	5.0	1.3	**.7**	1.1	9.4
2025–26	North Carolina	31	**31**	**31.5**	.608	**.426**	.615	**8.7**	**2.1**	.6	**1.2**	**17.0**
Career		97	36	20.1	.603	.383	.654	5.0	1.3	.5	.9	9.7
