= Kyan Evans =

American basketball player (born 2004)

No. 0 – Minnesota Golden Gophers
- Position: Point guard
- Conference: Big Ten Conference

Personal information
- Born: September 20, 2004 (age 22) Kansas City, Missouri, U.S.
- Listed height: 6 ft 2 in (1.88 m)
- Listed weight: 175 lb (79 kg)

Career information
- High school: Staley (Kansas City, Missouri)
- College: Colorado State (2023–2025); North Carolina (2025–2026); Minnesota (2026–present)

Career highlights
- Mr. Show-Me Basketball (2023)

Kyan Charles Evans (born September 20, 2004) is an American college basketball player for the Minnesota Golden Gophers of the Big Ten Conference. He previously played for the Colorado State Rams and North Carolina Tar Heels.

== Early life and high school ==
After a decorated high school and AAU career in the Kansas City area, Evans committed to play college basketball for the Colorado State Rams.

== College career ==
As a freshman in 2023-24, Evans averaged 1.7 points per game in 36 games. Heading into his sophomore season in 2024-25, he became a full-time starter after sitting behind Isaiah Stevens. On December 4, 2024, Evans hit four threes in a victory over Loyola Marymount. On February 25, 2025, he scored 20 points in a victory over Air Force. In the first round of the 2025 NCAA Division I men's basketball tournament, Evans dropped a career-high 23 points and six threes in an upset win over fifth seed Memphis. For his performance during the 2024-25 season, Evans earned all-Mountain West Conference honorable mention. He averaged 10.5 points, 3 rebounds and 3 assists per game. Following the season he transferred to North Carolina. Evans began the season as the Tar Heels starting point guard, but saw his minutes decline as the season progressed. After one season in Chapel Hill, he transferred to Minnesota where he reunited with his former head coach at Colorado State, Niko Medved, who had since taken over as the Golden Gophers’ head coach.
