= Mikel Brown Jr. =

American basketball player (born 2006)

No. 0 – Brooklyn Nets
- Position: Point guard
- League: NBA

Personal information
- Born: April 3, 2006 (age 20) Orlando, Florida, U.S.
- Listed height: 6 ft 4 in (1.93 m)
- Listed weight: 190 lb (86 kg)

Career information
- High school: Orlando Christian Prep (Orlando, Florida); Overtime Elite Academy (Atlanta, Georgia); DME Academy (Daytona Beach, Florida)
- College: Louisville (2025–2026)
- NBA draft: 2026: 1st round, 6th overall pick
- Drafted by: Brooklyn Nets
- Playing career: 2026–present

Career history
- 2026–present: Brooklyn Nets

Career highlights
- Third-team All-ACC (2026); ACC All-Rookie team (2026); McDonald's All-American (2025); Nike Hoop Summit (2025); USA Basketball Male Athlete of the Year (2025)
- Stats at NBA.com
- Stats at Basketball Reference
Medals
Men's basketball
Representing the United States
FIBA U19 World Cup
Gold medal – first place	2025 Switzerland	Team
FIBA Under-18 AmeriCup
Gold medal – first place	2024 Argentina	Team

Christopher Mikel Brown Jr. (born April 3, 2006) is an American basketball player for the Brooklyn Nets of the National Basketball Association (NBA). He played college basketball for the Louisville Cardinals.

== Early life and high school ==
Brown grew up in Orlando, Florida and initially attended Orlando Christian Prep. After his sophomore year, he opted to leave Orlando Christian Prep to join the Overtime Elite league as a non-professional player to preserve his collegiate eligibility. Brown averaged 13.4 points, 2.1 rebounds and 5.4 assists per game.

Brown transferred to DME Academy in Daytona Beach, Florida for his senior year. He was selected to play in the 2025 McDonald's All-American Boys Game during his senior year. Brown was also named to the Team USA roster for the Nike Hoop Summit.

Brown was a consensus five-star recruit and one of the top players in the 2025 class, according to major recruiting services. He committed to play college basketball at Louisville over offers from Alabama, Indiana and Ole Miss.

=== Recruiting ===
College recruiting
Name	Hometown	School	Height	Weight	Commit date
Mikel Brown Jr. #1 PG	Orlando, FL	DME Academy	6 ft 3 in (1.91 m)	165 lb (75 kg)	Jan 1, 2025
Mikel Brown Jr. #1 PG	Recruit ratings: Rivals: 247Sports: On3: ESPN: (95)				
Overall recruit ranking: Rivals: 10 247Sports: 6 On3: 7 ESPN: 8
Note: In many cases, Scout, Rivals, 247Sports, On3, and ESPN may conflict in their listings of height and weight.; In these cases, the average was taken. ESPN grades are on a 100-point scale.; Sources: "Louisville 2025 Basketball Commitments". Rivals.; "2025 Louisville Cardinals Recruiting Class". ESPN.; "2025 Team Ranking". Rivals.

== College career ==
As a freshman at Louisville, Brown averaged 18.2 points, 3.3 rebounds, 4.7 assists and 1.2 steals in 29.2 minutes across 21 games on 41.0% FG, 34.4% 3PT and 84.4% FT. He was named to the 2025 All-ACC Third Team and to the ACC All-Rookie team and earned two ACC Player and Rookie of the Week awards on November 17, 2025 and February 16, 2025. He scored 45 points in a 118–77 win over NC State on February 9, 2026, which broke Cooper Flagg's ACC freshman single-game scoring record and also tied Wes Unseld's scoring record at Louisville and set the school record with 10 three-pointers made. He scored at least 10 points in 16 of 21 outings with 20-plus points nine times, including three 29-point performances against Kentucky (November 11, 2025), Baylor (February 14, 2026, added six assists and a career-high five steals) and SMU (February 23, 2026). Brown opted out of the NCAA tournament due to a back injury. He declared for the 2026 NBA draft after the season.

== Professional career ==
On June 23, 2026, Brown was selected with the sixth overall pick by the Brooklyn Nets in the 2026 NBA draft.

== National team career ==
Brown has competed internationally for the United States in multiple occasions. He won gold with the 2025 USA Men's U19 National Team at the 2025 FIBA U19 Men's World Cup after averaging 14.9 points, 6.1 assists and 2.1 rebounds per game while shooting 47.6% from 3-point territory as the team went 7–0 in the tournament. He also played on the 2025 USA Men's Nike Hoop Summit Team that defeated the World Select Team, 124–114, in overtime. Brown scored 17 points while going 15 of 18 from the free throw line in that game, tying the most free throws ever made by a USA player in the event's history. He earned his first gold medal while playing on the United States under-18 basketball team at the 2024 FIBA Under-18 AmeriCup. He started in all six games of that tournament and averaged 10.3 points, 3.3 rebounds and 4.8 assists to earn All-Star Five honors, leading the team in assists and minutes played.

== Career statistics ==
Legend
GP	Games played	GS	Games started	MPG	Minutes per game
FG%	Field goal percentage	3P%	3-point field goal percentage	FT%	Free throw percentage
RPG	Rebounds per game	APG	Assists per game	SPG	Steals per game
BPG	Blocks per game	PPG	Points per game	**Bold**	Career high

=== College ===
Year	Team	GP	GS	MPG	FG%	3P%	FT%	RPG	APG	SPG	BPG	PPG
2025–26	Louisville	21	19	29.2	.410	.344	.844	3.3	4.7	1.2	.1	18.2

== Personal life ==
Brown's father played at Tallahassee Community College, USC Aiken and West Florida.
