= Malik Thomas =

American basketball player

No. 1 – Okapi Aalst
- Position: Shooting guard
- League: BNXT League

Personal information
- Born: February 4, 2002 (age 24) Fontana, California, U.S.
- Listed height: 6 ft 5 in (1.96 m)
- Listed weight: 215 lb (98 kg)

Career information
- High school: Damien (La Verne, California)
- College: USC (2021–2023); San Francisco (2023–2025); Virginia (2025–2026)
- NBA draft: 2026: undrafted
- Playing career: 2026–present

Career history
- 2026–present: Okapi Aalst

Career highlights
- First-team All-WCC (2025)

Malik Thomas (born February 4, 2002) is an American professional basketball player for Okapi Aalst of the BNXT League. He played college basketball for the USC Trojans, San Francisco Dons and Virginia Cavaliers.

== High school career ==
Thomas attended Damien High School in La Verne, California. During his time at Damien, he became the school's all-time leading scorer. As a junior, Thomas averaged 25.4 points and seven rebounds per game. As a senior, he averaged 21.8 points and 5.2 rebounds per game. As a result, he was named the Gatorade California Boys Basketball Player of the Year. A four-star recruit, Thomas committed to play college basketball at the University of Southern California.

== College career ==
Thomas played sparingly for two seasons at USC, before transferring to the University of San Francisco. As a senior, in his second season with San Francisco, Thomas emerged as the team's leading scorer. He also emerged as one of the West Coast Conference's leading scorers.

On May 10, 2025, Thomas announced his decision to transfer to the University of Virginia to play for the Virginia Cavaliers.

== Professional career ==
On July 21, 2026, he signed with Okapi Aalst of the BNXT League.

== Career statistics ==
Legend
GP	Games played	GS	Games started	MPG	Minutes per game
FG%	Field goal percentage	3P%	3-point field goal percentage	FT%	Free throw percentage
RPG	Rebounds per game	APG	Assists per game	SPG	Steals per game
BPG	Blocks per game	PPG	Points per game	**Bold**	Career high

=== College ===
Year	Team	GP	GS	MPG	FG%	3P%	FT%	RPG	APG	SPG	BPG	PPG
2021–22	USC	9	0	2.0	.167	.000	.500	.1	.1	.1	.0	.3
2022–23	USC	27	0	8.1	.365	.263	.737	1.0	.3	.4	.0	2.4
2023–24	San Francisco	33	21	23.2	.474	.400	.861	2.7	.5	.8	.0	12.4
2024–25	San Francisco	34	34	31.8	.444	.394	.851	3.9	2.1	1.6	.1	19.9
