= Dai Dai Ames =

American basketball player (born 2005)

No. 4 – Tennessee Volunteers
- Position: Point guard / shooting guard
- Conference: Southeastern Conference

Personal information
- Born: June 2, 2005 (age 21) Chicago, Illinois, U.S.
- Listed height: 6 ft 2 in (1.88 m)
- Listed weight: 190 lb (86 kg)

Career information
- High school: Morgan Park (Chicago, Illinois); Kenwood (Chicago, Illinois)
- College: Kansas State (2023–2024); Virginia (2024–2025); California (2025–2026); Tennessee (2026–present)

Career highlights
- Third-team All-ACC (2026); Jordan Brand Classic (2023)

Darrin Sylvestor "Dai Dai" Ames, Jr. (born June 2, 2005) is an American college basketball player for the Tennessee Volunteers of the Southeastern Conference (SEC). He previously played for the Kansas State Wildcats, Virginia Cavaliers, and California Golden Bears. As a high school senior he was a 2023 Jordan Brand Classic All-American selection. He was a point guard until late in his sophomore year at Virginia when he was switched to a shooting guard.

== Life and career ==
Darrin Sylvestor Ames, Jr. was born on June 2, 2005 in Chicago as the fourth child and fourth son to Darrin and Juanita Ames. He was in the Morgan Park High School basketball program as a freshman before transferring to Kenwood. As a junior, he posted a game-high 25 points in the IHSA 2022 Class 4A Sectional championship victory against a Morez Johnson-led St. Rita team. That year, he was named to the 2022 Associated Press Class 4A First-Team All-State along with Braden Huff, Owen Freeman, Nick Martinelli and AJ Casey. The team lost to Chicago Public League crosstown rival Whitney M. Young Magnet High School in the Class 4A UIC Supersectional (quarterfinal) despite 21 points and 5 assists from Ames. Kenwood finished with a 26–9 record. During the summer he committed to Kansas State over offers that included Marquette, Illinois, Arizona State, Appalachian State, LSU, Maryland. At the time, he was ranked as the 60th best player and 10th best point guard in the national class of 2023. He was ranked the number 1 player in the Illinois class of 2023, but he was not a serious contender in the 2022 Illinois Mr. Basketball voting.

In the December 2022 Proviso West Holiday Tournament, Ames scored 65 points in a 122–47 rout of Southland College Prep. The team returned to the Class 4A UIC Supersectional again and again fell short of making the school's first state final four tournament in boys' basketball after losing to Downers Grove North 67–47. He was a 2023 AP Class 4A First-Team All-State selectee along with Jeremy Fears Jr., Freeman, Johnson and Cam Christie. Although the top 3 scores of the AP Class 4A All-state voting was close (Fears, 105; Freeman, 102; Ames, 100), 2023 Illinois Mr. Basketball voting was another story with Brock Harding (275 points/46 first place votes) being followed by Fears (203/23) in second and Freeman (104/11) in third, while Ames was a distant seventh (33/1).

As a senior, he averaged 21.4 points, 4.3 assists, and 2.4 steals. He was one of 32 2023 Jordan Brand Classic selectees. He was the third in Kansas State basketball history, joining Curtis Kelly (2006) and Wally Judge (2009) and one of four incoming Big 12 Conference honorees, joining Omaha Biliew (Iowa State), Brandon Garrison (Oklahoma State) and Ja'Kobe Walter (Baylor). Ames finished his career as the #83-ranked player and #13-ranked point guard in the national class of 2023 and #2-ranked player in the state of Illinois class of 2023.

College recruiting
| Name | Hometown | School | Height | Weight | Commit date |
|---|---|---|---|---|---|
| Dai Dai Ames #16 PG | Chicago, IL | Kenwood Academy High School | 6 ft 1 in (1.85 m) | 170 lb (77 kg) | Jul 20, 2022 |
| Dai Dai Ames #16 PG | Recruit ratings: Scout: Rivals: 247Sports: ESPN: (85) | | | | |
Overall recruit ranking: Scout: NA Rivals: NA ESPN: 85, 16 (PG)
Note: In many cases, Scout, Rivals, 247Sports, On3, and ESPN may conflict in their listings of height and weight.; In these cases, the average was taken. ESPN grades are on a 100-point scale.; Sources: "2023 Kansas State Basketball Commits". Rivals.; "2023 Kansas State Basketball Commits". Scout.; "2023 Kansas State Basketball Commits". ESPN.; "Scout.com Team Recruiting Rankings". Scout.; "2023 Team Ranking". Rivals.

== College ==
As a true freshman at Kansas State, Ames was listed at 6 ft 1 in (1.85 m) and 185 pounds (83.9 kg). On November 17, 2023, Garwey Dual of Providence and Ames had an altercation that led to Ames being punched in the face and Dual being ejected from the opening round game of 2023 Bahamas Championship. He started 16 games including the final 13 games of the season. He posted two double digit scoring efforts: on January 27, 2024, he posted 11 points against the No. 4 ranked Houston Cougars; on March 19, he tallied a team-high 16 points along with 5 assists against Iowa in the 2024 National Invitation Tournament. Ames finished his season with 45% (15–33) three point shooting in his final 16 games. (Note: coincidentally, Ames would also shoot 45% (19–42) on his three point shooting over his final 12 Atlantic Coast Conference regular season games the following year for Virginia.) Ames entered the NCAA transfer portal on April 28, after averaging 5.2 points and 2.0 assists. He visited Virginia on May 6. On May 15, he committed to Virginia. As the fifth transfer, he claimed the school's final scholarship offer.

At Virginia, sophomore Ames started in 26 of 32 games and posted double digit scoring efforts 14 times, including 10 consecutive 2024–25 Atlantic Coast Conference season games from February 1, 2025 — March 8, 2025, when he tallied 59.5% overall field goal percentage (59 of 99) and 44% from three point range (16 of 36). He posted a career-high 27 points on February 3, 2025 against Pittsburgh, despite entering the game with a 6.2 scoring average. He also had 2 18-point performances in this stretch: On February 8, he posted 18 (14 in the second half) in a 75–61 wind against Georgia Tech; On March 4, he posted a game-high 18 points, including 2 free throws with five seconds left, in a 60–57 win against Florida State.

Following the season, he entered the transfer portal on March 19, 2025. It was speculated that he was disappointed that Virginia failed to make the tournament and that the team had released coach Ron Sanchez, who had recruited him. He was expected to be considering Virginia Tech, Arkansas, Tennessee, Oklahoma State, Texas. It turned out that the leading programs with interest in him included Seton Hall, Clemson, Florida State, and Nevada. He took a visit to Cal. On April 1, he committed to Cal. The assessment of Ames at the time was that he had shooting guard skills in a point guard body based on measurements of 6 ft 1 in (1.85 m) and 160 pounds (72.6 kg) and had been misused at the point at Virginia, but his late season success was due to a transition to the shooting guard position.

During the 2025 offseason, Cal did nearly a complete overhaul of its roster. On November 13, Cal lost 99–96 to Kansas State despite 25 points, a career-high tying 7 assist and a career high 5 steals from Ames. On December 2, 2025 Ames had a game-high 25 points, including 6 consecutive free throws in the final 50.3 seconds, against Utah to lead Cal to a 79–72 victory and the school's first 7–1 start since the 2016–17 Bears team. Ames contributed 20 points in the December 13 victory over Northwestern State that gave Cal its first 10–1 start since the 2014–15 team. Ames posted 21 points in the December 21 victory over Columbia to reach 12–1. The last time the school started 12–1 had been the 1959–60 team that entered the 1960 NCAA University Division basketball tournament with one loss and were national runner-up. At the time of the 12–1 hot start, Ames led the team with a 17.7 scoring average. On January 2, Ames made two three point shots in the final 11 seconds, including a four-point play with 5 seconds left as part of a game-high 23-point performance to lift Cal to a 72–71 victory over Notre Dame. In a game the previous year between the two teams the 2024–25 Fighting Irish had defeated the 2024–25 Bears in quadruple overtime. The controversial foul that resulted in the game-winning free throw was double reversed (reversed and then reinstated), resulting in a tirade by Notre Dame coach Micah Shrewsberry and a reprimand of him by the ACC. On January 17, Ames posted 19 points in a victory against No. 14-ranked North Carolina. On February 4, Ames tallied a career-high 29 points during a 9-of-13 shooting night in a 90–85 victory over Georgia Tech. On March 7, Ames tallied a career-high 31 points against in the regular season finale against Wake Forest, but his 31 points were matched by 31 points from Juke Harris as Wake Forest prevailed 80–73. Following the regular season, he was named third team 2025–26 All-ACC and finished as runner-up to Harris for the conference Most Improved Player award. Ames followed that up in the 2026 ACC men's basketball tournament by posting 27 points on March 11 against Florida State. In 76–75 loss to Saint Joseph's in second round of the 2026 National Invitation Tournament Ames' 17 points propelled him past the 1000-career point plateau.

On April 11, Ames committed to play for Tennessee over other pursuing schools such as Kansas, Xavier, and Ole Miss.
