= Ryan Conwell =

American basketball player (born 2004)

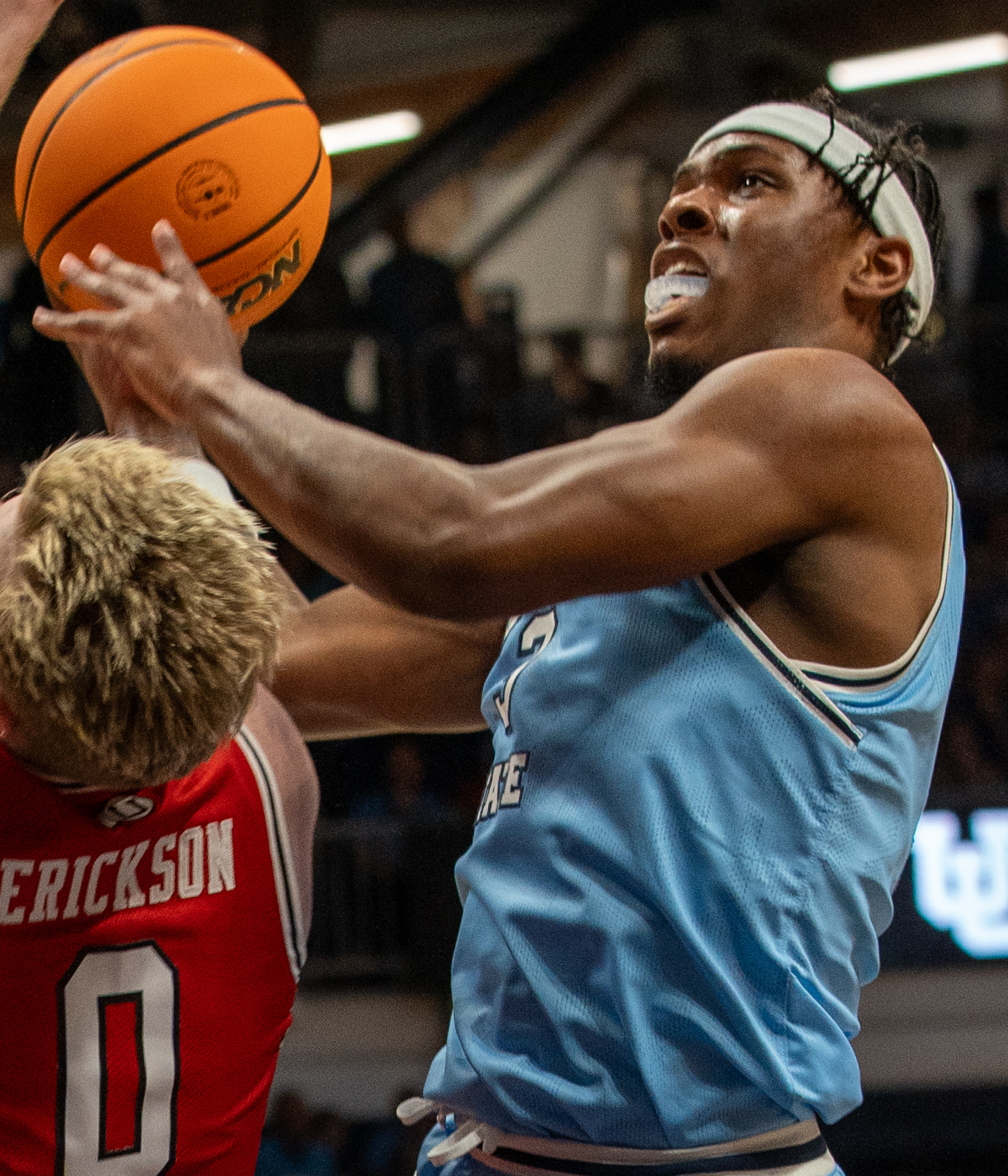
- Conwell in 2024

No. 4 – Miami Heat
- Position: Shooting guard
- League: NBA

Personal information
- Born: June 15, 2004 (age 22) Indianapolis, Indiana, U.S.
- Listed height: 6 ft 2 in (1.88 m)
- Listed weight: 215 lb (98 kg)

Career information
- High school: Pike (Indianapolis, Indiana)
- College: South Florida (2022–2023); Indiana State (2023–2024); Xavier (2024–2025); Louisville (2025–2026)
- NBA draft: 2026: 2nd round, 37th overall pick
- Drafted by: Oklahoma City Thunder
- Playing career: 2026–present

Career history
- 2026–present: Miami Heat

Career highlights
- Second-team All-ACC (2026); Second-team All-MVC (2024); Third-team All-Big East (2025)
- Stats at NBA.com
- Stats at Basketball Reference

Ryan Christopher Conwell (born June 15, 2004) is an American basketball player for the Miami Heat of the National Basketball Association (NBA). He played college Basketball for the South Florida Bulls, Indiana State Sycamores, Xavier Musketeers, and Louisville Cardinals.

== Early life and high school ==
As a junior at Pike High School, Conwell averaged 16.4 points, 4.3 rebounds, and 2.7 assists per game. As a senior, he averaged 22.6 points, 6.7 rebounds, 3.7 assists, and 3.0 steals per game. Coming out of high school, Conwell was rated as a three-star recruit and committed to play college basketball for the South Florida Bulls.

== College career ==
=== South Florida ===
As a freshman in 2022–23, Conwell appeared in 32 games with 21 starts, where he averaged 5.1 points per game before he entered the NCAA transfer portal three days after his head coach took another job.

=== Indiana State ===
Conwell transferred to play for the Indiana State Sycamores. On December 16, 2023, he scored a career-high 27 points in a win over Ball State. During the 2023–24 season, Conwell averaged 16.6 points, 5.8 rebounds, and 2.5 assists per game earning second-team all-Missouri Valley Conference honors. After the season, he entered his name into the NCAA transfer portal.

=== Xavier ===
Conwell transferred to play for the Xavier Musketeers. On January 14, 2025, he scored a career-high 34 points with six threes in a victory against Villanova. On March 5, 2025, Conwell dropped 21 points versus Butler. On March 13, 2025, Conwell notched 38 points with seven threes in a loss to Marquette. He averaged 16.5 points, 2.7 rebounds, 2.5 assists and 1.3 steals per game. For his performance during the 2024–25 season, Conwell was named third-team all-Big East.

=== Louisville ===
On April 1, 2025, Conwell transferred to Louisville. During the 2025–26 season, he averaged a team-high 18.8 points, 4.8 rebounds, and 2.7 assists per game, earning second-team All-ACC honors. He scored a season-high 32 points against NJIT on November 26, 2025, and later scored 31 points against NC State on February 9, 2026. He helped lead the Cardinals to a 24–11 record and to the second round of the NCAA tournament, where Louisville defeated South Florida before losing to Michigan State.

== Professional career ==
On June 24, 2026, Conwell was selected by the Oklahoma City Thunder with the 37th overall pick in the 2026 NBA draft then immediately traded to the Miami Heat for pick 41 (Otega Oweh) and cash considerations.

== Career statistics ==
School	Season	GP	MPG	FG%	3P%	FT%	RPG	APG	SPG	BPG	PPG
South Florida	2022–23	32	18.6	.340	.300	.816	1.9	1.9	0.9	0.1	5.1
Indiana State	2023–24	38	33.9	.482	.407	.855	5.8	2.5	1.1	0.3	16.6
Xavier	2024–25	34	33.0	.450	.412	.828	2.7	2.5	1.3	0.2	16.5
Louisville	2025–26	34	30.9	.408	.345	.832	4.8	2.7	1.1	0.2	18.8
