= 2025–26 NC State Wolfpack men's basketball team =

American college basketball season

2025–26 NC State Wolfpack men's basketball

NCAA tournament, First Four
- Conference: Atlantic Coast Conference
- Record: 20–14 (10–8 ACC)
- Head coach: Will Wade (1st season)
- Assistant coaches: Brandon Chambers (1st season); Vernon Hamilton (1st season); Adam Howard (1st season)
- Home arena: Lenovo Center

2025–26 ACC men's basketball standings
	Conf.				Overall
Team	W		L	PCT	W		L	PCT
No. 4 Duke †	17	–	1	.944	35	–	3	.921
No. 17 Virginia	15	–	3	.833	30	–	6	.833
No. 24 Miami (FL)	13	–	5	.722	26	–	9	.743
North Carolina	12	–	6	.667	24	–	9	.727
Clemson	12	–	6	.667	24	–	11	.686
No. 23 Louisville	11	–	7	.611	24	–	11	.686
NC State	10	–	8	.556	20	–	14	.588
Florida State	10	–	8	.556	18	–	15	.545
California	9	–	9	.500	22	–	12	.647
Stanford	9	–	9	.500	20	–	13	.606
SMU	8	–	10	.444	20	–	14	.588
Virginia Tech	8	–	10	.444	19	–	13	.594
Wake Forest	7	–	11	.389	18	–	17	.514
Syracuse	6	–	12	.333	15	–	17	.469
Pittsburgh	5	–	13	.278	13	–	20	.394
Notre Dame	4	–	14	.222	13	–	18	.419
Boston College	4	–	14	.222	11	–	20	.355
Georgia Tech	2	–	16	.111	11	–	20	.355
† 2026 ACC tournament winner Rankings from AP Poll

The 2025–26 NC State Wolfpack men's basketball team represented North Carolina State University during the 2025–26 NCAA Division I men's basketball season. The Wolfpack were led by first-year head coach Will Wade and played their home games at Lenovo Center in Raleigh, North Carolina as members of the Atlantic Coast Conference (ACC). Wade began his first season after Kevin Keatts was not retained after the previous season.

The Wolfpack began the season with four straight wins. They entered the AP poll as the twenty-fifth ranked team after their defeat of UNC Greensboro. A defeat of VCU saw them rise to twenty-third, a ranking they took to the Maui Invitational. They lost their opening game of the tournament by nine-points against Seton Hall. A rebound win over Boise State by eleven points couldn't prevent them from falling out of the rankings. The team left Hawaii finishing in sixth place after a loss to Texas. They lost at twentith-ranked Auburn in the ACC–SEC Challenge before winning two games against non-Power 4 opponents. The Wolfpack lost to nineteenth-ranked Kansas in overtime before winning their final two non-conference games. They defeated their first Power 4 opponent of the season in the final game of their non-conference schedule, a 76–62 victory over Ole Miss. The team defeated rivals Wake Forest in their first ACC game. The Wolfpack went 3–2 over their next five games, with losses coming against twenty-first ranked Virginia and Georgia Tech. They defeated eighteenth-ranked Clemson in overtime over this stretch. The team won its next five straight games, including a rivalry rematch against Wake Forest and a one-point victory at SMU. The Wolfpack couldn't carry the momentum through to the end of the season as they lost six of their last seven games. Their only victory in the stretch was an upset win over rivals and sixteenth-ranked North Carolina. They lost to three ranked teams over the stretch: top ranked, and rivals Duke, eleventh-ranked Virginia, and twenty-fourth ranked Louisville. They also suffered an overtime loss to Notre Dame.

The Wolfpack finished the season 20–14 overall and 10–8 in ACC play to finish in a tie for seventh place. As the seventh seed in the 2026 ACC tournament They earned a bye into the Second Round where they defeated Pittsburgh by ten points. They run ended there as they lost to Virginia for a third time this season. Virginia was the second seed and ranked tenth at the time of this meeting. The Wolfpack earned an at-large bid to the NCAA tournament and were placed in the First Four as one of the eleven-seeds in the West region. They lost to Texas, for the second time this season, to end their season.

== Previous season ==
The Wolfpack finished the season 12–19 and 5–15 in ACC play to finish in sixteenth place. Under the new ACC tournament rules, they did not qualify for the 2025 ACC tournament and were unable to defend their tournament title. They were not invited to the NCAA tournament or the NIT. After the season, head coach Kevin Keatts was fired just one year after leading the team to the Final Four.

== Offseason ==
=== Departures ===
Departures
Name	Number	Pos.	Height	Weight	Year	Hometown	Reason for departure
Mike James	0	G	6'5"	200	(redshirt) Junior	Orlando, Florida	Transferred to Vanderbilt
Brandon Huntley-Hatfield	1	F	6'10"	240	Senior	Clarksville, Tennessee	Entered transfer portal
Dontrez Styles	3	G/F	6'8"	210	Senior	Kinston, North Carolina	Entered transfer portal
Breon Pass	4	G	6'0"	175	Senior	Reidsville, North Carolina	Entered transfer portal
Trey Parker	5	G	6'1"	165	Freshman	Fayetteville, North Carolina	Transferred to Seton Hall
Bryce Heard	7	G	6'5"	170	Freshman	Chicago, Illinois	Transferred to Dayton
Jayden Taylor	8	G	6'4"	195	Senior	Indianapolis, Indiana	Graduated
Marcus Hill	10	G	6'4"	185	Senior	Rockford, Illinois	Transferred to Texas A&M
Dennis Parker Jr.	11	G	6'6"	205	Sophomore	Richmond, Virginia	Transferred to Radford
Michael O'Connell	12	G	6'2"	195	Graduate Student	Mineola, New York	Graduated
KJ Keats	13	G	5'10"	165	Junior	Cary, North Carolina	—
Ernest Ross	24	F	6'9"	200	Senior	Alachua, Florida	Graduated
Ismaël Diouf	33	F	6'9"	215	Junior	Saint-Jean-sur-Richelieu, Quebec	Transferred to Northern Iowa
Ben Middlebrooks	34	F	6'10"	240	Senior	Fort Lauderdale, Florida	Graduated

=== Incoming transfers ===
Incoming transfers
Name	Number	Pos.	Height	Weight	Year	Hometown	Previous school
Darrion Williams	1	F	6'6"	225	Senior	Sacramento, California	Texas Tech
Tre Holloman	5	G	6'2"	195	Senior	Minneapolis, Minnesota	Michigan State
Alyn Breed	7	G	6'3"	200	(redshirt) Senior	Powder Springs, Georgia	McNeese
Quadir Copeland	11	G	6'6"	220	Senior	Philadelphia, Pennsylvania	McNeese
Scottie Ebube	12	C	6'10"	280	Senior	Mundelein, Illinois	Wyoming
Jerry Deng	15	F	6'9"	230	Junior	Rochester, New York	Florida State
Terrance Arceneaux	21	G	6'6"	205	(redshirt) Junior	Beaumont, Texas	Houston
Ven-Allen Lubin	22	F	6'9"	250	Senior	Orlando, Florida	North Carolina
Colt Langdon	45	F	6'7"	230	(redshirt) Freshman	Raleigh, North Carolina	Butler

=== 2025 recruiting class ===
College recruiting information
Name	Hometown	School	Height	Weight	Commit date
Matt Able; G	Baltimore, Maryland	Sagemont Prep	6 ft 6 in (1.98 m)	205 lb (93 kg)	Apr 5, 2025
Matt Able; G	Recruit ratings: Scout: Rivals: 247Sports: ESPN: (89)				
Jayme Kontuniemi; G	Helsinki, Finland	Drive Academy Espoo	6 ft 4 in (1.93 m)	215 lb (98 kg)	May 23, 2025
Jayme Kontuniemi; G	Recruit ratings: Scout: Rivals: 247Sports: ESPN: (NR)				
Musa Sagnia; F	Bakau, The Gambia	Bàsquet Manresa	6 ft 10 in (2.08 m)	235 lb (107 kg)	Aug 30, 2025
Musa Sagnia; F	Recruit ratings: Scout: Rivals: 247Sports: ESPN: (NR)				
Zymicah Wilkins; F	Rutherfordton, North Carolina	Christ School	6 ft 9 in (2.06 m)	260 lb (120 kg)	Nov 14, 2024
Zymicah Wilkins; F	Recruit ratings: Scout: Rivals: 247Sports: ESPN: (85)				
Overall recruit ranking: Scout: 50 Rivals: 13 ESPN: NR
Note: In many cases, Scout, Rivals, 247Sports, On3, and ESPN may conflict in their listings of height and weight.; In these cases, the average was taken. ESPN grades are on a 100-point scale.; Sources: "2025 NC State Commits". Rivals.; "Men's Basketball Recruiting". Scout.; "ESPN- NC State Wolfpack Men's Basketball Recruiting". ESPN.; "Scout.com Team Recruiting Rankings". Scout.; "2025 Team Ranking". Rivals.

== Roster ==
2025–26 NC State Wolfpack men's basketball team
Players
Coaches

Pos.	#	Name	Height	Weight	Year	Previous school	Hometown
G	0	Jordan Snell	6 ft 3 in (1.91 m)	195 lb (88 kg)	Sr	Panther Creek	Cary, NC
F	1	Darrion Williams	6 ft 6 in (1.98 m)	225 lb (102 kg)	Sr	Bishop Gorman; Texas Tech	Sacramento, CA
G	2	Paul McNeil	6 ft 5 in (1.96 m)	190 lb (86 kg)	So	Richmond Senior	Rockingham, NC
G	3	Matt Able	6 ft 6 in (1.98 m)	205 lb (93 kg)	Fr	Sagemont Prep	Baltimore, MD
G	5	Tre Holloman	6 ft 2 in (1.88 m)	195 lb (88 kg)	Sr	Cretin-Derham Hall; Michigan State	Minneapolis, MN
G	7	Alyn Breed	6 ft 3 in (1.91 m)	200 lb (91 kg)	RS Sr	McEachern; McNeese	Powder Springs, GA
G	10	Jayme Kontuniemi	6 ft 4 in (1.93 m)	215 lb (98 kg)	Fr	Drive Academy Espoo	Helsinki, Finland
G	11	Quadir Copeland	6 ft 6 in (1.98 m)	220 lb (100 kg)	Sr	IMG Academy; McNeese	Philadelphia, PA
C	12	Scottie Ebube	6 ft 10 in (2.08 m)	280 lb (127 kg)	Sr	Mundelein; Wyoming	Mundelein, IL
G	13	Musa Sagnia	6 ft 10 in (2.08 m)	235 lb (107 kg)	Fr	Bàsquet Manresa	Bakau, The Gambia
F	15	Jerry Deng	6 ft 9 in (2.06 m)	230 lb (104 kg)	Jr	Norcross; Florida State	Rochester, NY
G	21	Terrance Arceneaux	6 ft 6 in (1.98 m)	205 lb (93 kg)	RS Jr	Beaumont United; Houston	Beaumont, TX
F	22	Ven-Allen Lubin	6 ft 9 in (2.06 m)	250 lb (113 kg)	Sr	Orlando Christian; North Carolina	Orlando, FL
F	33	Zymicah Wilkins	6 ft 9 in (2.06 m)	260 lb (118 kg)	Fr	Christ School	Rutherfordton, NC
F	45	Colt Langdon	6 ft 7 in (2.01 m)	230 lb (104 kg)	RS Fr	Millbrook; Butler	Raleigh, NC

Head coach

- Will Wade (Clemson)

Assistant coach(es)

- Brandon Chambers (VCU)
- Vernon Hamilton (Clemson)
- Adam Howard (Western Kentucky)

Legend

- (C) Team captain
- (S) Suspended
- (I) Ineligible
- (W) Walk-on
- Injured
- Current redshirt

Roster
Last update: November 2, 2025

== Schedule and results ==
Date time, TV	Rank^{#}	Opponent^{#}	Result	Record	High points	High rebounds	High assists	Site (attendance) city, state
Exhibition
October 26, 2025*; 4:30 p.m.		South Carolina	W 88–86	–	18 – Lubin	7 – Williams	3 – Holloman	First Horizon Coliseum (8,000); Greensboro, NC
Non-Conference regular season
November 3, 2025*; 7:00 p.m., ACCNX		NC Central	W 114–66	1–0	19 – Williams	6 – Tied	8 – Williams	Lenovo Center (19,119); Raleigh, NC
November 7, 2025*; 9:00 p.m., ACCN		UAB	W 94–70	2–0	18 – Tied	10 – Sagnia	5 – Tied	Lenovo Center (15,918); Raleigh, NC
November 12, 2025*; 8:00 p.m., ACCN		UNC Greensboro	W 110–64	3–0	32 – Williams	10 – Williams	6 – Copeland	Lenovo Center (14,516); Raleigh, NC
November 17, 2025*; 7:00 p.m., ACCN	No. 25	VCU	W 85–79	4–0	28 – Williams	9 – Tied	4 – Copeland	Lenovo Center (14,805); Raleigh, NC
November 24, 2025*; 2:30 p.m., ESPN2	No. 23	vs. Seton Hall; Maui Invitational Quarterfinal	L 74–85	4–1	16 – Lubin	9 – Lubin	6 – Copeland	Lahaina Civic Center (2,400); Lahaina, HI
November 25, 2025*; 2:30 p.m., ESPN2	No. 23	vs. Boise State; Maui Invitational Consolation second round	W 81–70	5–1	16 – Williams	12 – Lubin	4 – Holloman	Lahaina Civic Center (2,400); Lahaina, HI
November 26, 2025*; 9:30 p.m., ESPN2	No. 23	vs. Texas; Maui Invitational 5th Place Game	L 97–102	5–2	28 – Copeland	9 – Lubin	6 – Copeland	Lahaina Civic Center (2,400); Lahaina, HI
December 3, 2025*; 9:15 p.m., ESPN		at No. 20 Auburn; ACC–SEC Challenge	L 73–83	5–3	22 – Copeland	4 – McNeil	4 – Holloman	Neville Arena (9,121); Auburn, AL
December 6, 2025*; 1:00 p.m., The CW		UNC Asheville	W 75–63	6–3	23 – Lubin	12 – Lubin	8 – Copeland	Lenovo Center (14,862); Raleigh, NC
December 10, 2025*; 7:00 p.m., ACCN		Liberty	W 85–45	7–3	13 – Tied	8 – Williams	7 – Copeland	Lenovo Center (14,515); Raleigh, NC
December 13, 2025*; 5:30 p.m., ESPN		No. 19 Kansas	L 76–77 ^{OT}	7–4	19 – Copeland	11 – Lubin	6 – Copeland	Lenovo Center (19,119); Raleigh, NC
December 17, 2025*; 7:00 p.m., ACCNX		Texas Southern	W 108–72	8–4	47 – McNeil Jr.	10 – McNeil Jr.	9 – Copeland	Reynolds Coliseum (5,500); Raleigh, NC
December 21, 2025*; 1:00 p.m., ESPN		vs. Ole Miss	W 76–62	9–4	19 – McNeil Jr.	7 – Tied	9 – Copeland	First Horizon Coliseum (212); Greensboro, NC
ACC regular season
December 31, 2025; 12:00 p.m., ESPN2		Wake Forest; Rivalry	W 70–57	10–4 (1–0)	14 – Copeland	11 – Lubin	8 – Copeland	Lenovo Center (16,105); Raleigh, NC
January 3, 2026; 11:00 a.m., ESPN2		No. 21 Virginia	L 61–76	10–5 (1–1)	15 – Copeland	5 – Tied	4 – Copeland	Lenovo Center (16,144); Raleigh, NC
January 6, 2026; 9:00 p.m., ACCN		at Boston College	W 79–71	11–5 (2–1)	22 – Williams	6 – Able	10 – Copeland	Conte Forum (1,892); Chestnut Hill, MA
January 10, 2026; 12:00 p.m., ACCN		at Florida State	W 113–69	12–5 (3–1)	21 – McNeil Jr.	10 – Williams	6 – Copeland	Donald L. Tucker Center (6,917); Tallahassee, FL
January 17, 2026; 12:00 p.m., The CW		Georgia Tech	L 74–78	12–6 (3–2)	16 – Copeland	7 – Lubin	6 – Copeland	Lenovo Center (16,378); Raleigh, NC
January 20, 2026; 7:00 p.m., ACCN		at No. 18 Clemson	W 80–76 ^{OT}	13–6 (4–2)	22 – Lubin	6 – Tied	6 – Copeland	Littlejohn Coliseum (9,000); Clemson, SC
January 24, 2026; 12:00 p.m., ESPNU		at Pittsburgh	W 81–72	14–6 (5–2)	20 – Copeland	12 – Lubin	9 – Copeland	Petersen Events Center (5,572); Pittsburgh, PA
January 27, 2026; 7:00 p.m., ESPNU		Syracuse	W 88–68	15–6 (6–2)	24 – Freeman	10 – Freeman	3 – Tied	Lenovo Center (15,636); Raleigh, NC
January 31, 2026; 3:45 p.m., The CW		at Wake Forest; Rivalry	W 96–78	16–6 (7–2)	28 – McNeil Jr.	8 – Lubin	10 – Copelnad	LJVM Coliseum (5,821); Winston-Salem, NC
February 3, 2026; 9:00 p.m., ESPN2		at SMU	W 84–83	17–6 (8–2)	25 – Williams	10 – Copeland	16 – Copeland	Moody Coliseum (5,924); University Park, TX
February 7, 2026; 12:00 p.m., The CW		Virginia Tech	W 82–73	18–6 (9–2)	21 – Tied	7 – Lubin	10 – Copeland	Lenovo Center (19,119); Raleigh, NC
February 9, 2026; 7:00 p.m., ESPN		at No. 24 Louisville	L 77–118	18–7 (9–3)	20 – Lubin	7 – Able	3 – Copeland	KFC Yum! Center (14,389); Louisville, KY
February 14, 2026; 4:00 p.m., ESPN2		Miami (FL)	L 76–77	18–8 (9–4)	17 – Tied	9 – Lubin	5 – Copeland	Lenovo Center (18,410); Raleigh, NC
February 17, 2026; 7:00 p.m., ESPN		No. 16 North Carolina; Rivalry	W 82–58	19–8 (10–4)	20 – Copeland	7 – McNeil Jr.	7 – Copeland	Lenovo Center (19,367); Raleigh, NC
February 24, 2026; 7:00 p.m., ACCN		at No. 11 Virginia	L 61–90	19–9 (10–5)	22 – McNeil Jr.	7 – Lubin	5 – Copeland	John Paul Jones Arena (13,526); Charlottesville, VA
February 28, 2026; 12:00 p.m., The CW		at Notre Dame	L 90–96 ^{OT}	19–10 (10–6)	24 – Lubin	10 – Lubin	9 – Copeland	Joyce Center (6,446); South Bend, IN
March 2, 2026; 7:00 p.m., ESPN		No. 1 Duke; Rivalry	L 64–93	19–11 (10–7)	17 – Williams	8 – Sagnia	5 – Copeland	Lenovo Center (19,367); Raleigh, NC
March 7, 2026; 2:15 p.m., The CW		Stanford	L 84–85	19–12 (10–8)	17 – Lubin	11 – Lubin	3 – Williams	Lenovo Center (18,922); Raleigh, NC
ACC tournament
March 11, 2026; 12:00 p.m., ESPN2	(7)	vs. (15) Pittsburgh; Second round	W 98–88	20–12	24 – Copeland	5 – Lubin	8 – Copeland	Spectrum Center (8,116); Charlotte, NC
March 12, 2026; 12:00 p.m., ESPN2	(7)	vs. (2) No. 10 Virginia; Quarterfinal	L 74–81	20–13	26 – NcNeil Jr.	10 – Lubin	6 – Copeland	Spectrum Center (11,722); Charlotte, NC
NCAA tournament
March 17, 2026*; 9:15 p.m., truTV	(11 W)	vs. (11 W) Texas; First Four	L 66–68	20–14	21 – Williams	8 – Copeland	4 – Holloman	UD Arena (11,756); Dayton, OH
*Non-conference game. ^{#}Rankings from AP poll. (#) Tournament seedings in parentheses. W=West. All times are in Eastern Time.

== Rankings ==
Ranking movements Legend: ██ Increase in ranking ██ Decrease in ranking — = Not ranked RV = Received votes
	Week																				
Poll	Pre	1	2	3	4	5	6	7	8	9	10	11	12	13	14	15	16	17	18	19	Final
AP	RV	RV	25	23	RV	—	—	RV	RV*	—	RV	—	RV	RV	RV	—	RV	RV	—	—	—
Coaches	RV	RV	RV	22	RV	—	RV	—	—	—	—	—	—	RV	RV	—	—	—	—	—	—

*AP did not release a week 8 poll.
