= 2025–26 Wake Forest Demon Deacons men's basketball team =

American college basketball season

2025–26 Wake Forest Demon Deacons men's basketball

NIT, Second Round
- Conference: Atlantic Coast Conference
- Record: 18–17 (7–11 ACC)
- Head coach: Steve Forbes (6th season)
- Assistant coaches: BJ McKie; Matt Woodley; Jason Shay; Antanas Kavaliauskas
- Home arena: LJVM Coliseum

2025–26 ACC men's basketball standings
	Conf.				Overall
Team	W		L	PCT	W		L	PCT
No. 4 Duke †	17	–	1	.944	35	–	3	.921
No. 17 Virginia	15	–	3	.833	30	–	6	.833
No. 24 Miami (FL)	13	–	5	.722	26	–	9	.743
North Carolina	12	–	6	.667	24	–	9	.727
Clemson	12	–	6	.667	24	–	11	.686
No. 23 Louisville	11	–	7	.611	24	–	11	.686
NC State	10	–	8	.556	20	–	14	.588
Florida State	10	–	8	.556	18	–	15	.545
California	9	–	9	.500	22	–	12	.647
Stanford	9	–	9	.500	20	–	13	.606
SMU	8	–	10	.444	20	–	14	.588
Virginia Tech	8	–	10	.444	19	–	13	.594
Wake Forest	7	–	11	.389	18	–	17	.514
Syracuse	6	–	12	.333	15	–	17	.469
Pittsburgh	5	–	13	.278	13	–	20	.394
Notre Dame	4	–	14	.222	13	–	18	.419
Boston College	4	–	14	.222	11	–	20	.355
Georgia Tech	2	–	16	.111	11	–	20	.355
† 2026 ACC tournament winner Rankings from AP Poll

The 2025–26 Wake Forest Demon Deacons men's basketball team represented Wake Forest University during the 2025–26 NCAA Division I men's basketball season. The Demon Deacons, led by sixth-year head coach Steve Forbes, played their home games at the Lawrence Joel Veterans Memorial Coliseum in Winston-Salem, North Carolina as members of the Atlantic Coast Conference.

The Demon Deacons began their season with two straight wins before traveling to Detroit, Michigan to face sixth-ranked Michigan. Wake Forest would go on to lose that game by a single point in overtime. They defeated UMass Lowell before traveling to Nassau, The Bahamas to participate in the Baha Mar Championship. They lost their opening match of the tournament by a point to fifteenth-ranked Texas Tech and defeated Memphis by a point to finish in third place. The Demon Deacons lost their ACC–SEC Challenge game against Oklahoma but won their Holiday Hoopfest match versus West Virginia. They won two games before finishing their non-conference season with a loss to thirteenth-ranked Vanderbilt. The Demon Deacons opened ACC play with a rivalry loss to NC State. They went 2–2 over their next four games, defeating Virginia Tech and Florida State but losing to rivals and seventeenth-ranked North Carolina and Miami (FL). The team experienced their toughest stretich of the season next, losing their next five games. This stretch included an overtime loss at Pittsburgh, a rivaly re-match with NC State, a loss to fifth-ranked Duke and a loss to twenty-fourth ranked Louisville. The Demon Deacons went 3–2 over their next five games. The finished the season on a 2–1 run, where their only loss was by five points at Virginia.

The Demon Deacons finished the season 18–17 and 7–11 in ACC play to finish in thirteenth place. As the thirteenth seed in the 2026 ACC tournament, they defeated Virginia Tech in the First Round in overtime. They were defeated by fifth-seed Clemson in the Second Round. They accepted an exempt bit do the NIT. They were the first seed in their quadrant of the bracket. THey defeated Navy by ten points before losing to fourth-seed Illinois State in the Second Round by three points to end their season.

== Previous season ==
The Demon Deacons finished the season 21–11 and 13–7 in ACC play to finish in a three-way tie for fourth place. Wake Forest finished atop the tiebreaking procedure and was the fourth seed in the 2025 ACC tournament. As the fourth seed, they earned a bye into the quarterfinals where they lost to rivals North Carolina 68–59. They were not invited to the NCAA tournament and declined an invitation to the NIT.

== Offseason ==
=== Departures ===
Departures
Name	Number	Pos.	Height	Weight	Year	Hometown	Reason for departure
Davin Cosby	1	G	6'5"	210	Sophomore	Richmond, Virginia	Transferred to Kennesaw State
Efton Reid	4	F/C	7'0"	250	Senior	Richmond, Virginia	Graduated, signed with Kobrat
Cameron Hildreth	6	G	6'4"	195	Senior	Worthing, England	Graduated, signed with the Noblesville Boom
Parker Friedrichsen	7	G	6'4"	185	Sophomore	Bixby, Oklahoma	Transferred to Davidson
Ty-Laur Johnson	8	G	6'0"	170	Sophomore	Brooklyn, New York	Transferred to San Diego
Mason Hagedorn	20	F	6'9"	225	Freshman	Charlotte, North Carolina	Transferred to VMI
Hunter Sallis	23	G	6'5"	185	Senior	Omaha, Nebraska	Graduated and signed two-way NBA contract with the Philadelphia 76ers
RJ Kennah	40	G	6'5"	200	Senior	Parker, Colorado	Graduated
Owen Kmety	44	F	6'7"	210	Junior	Chicago, Illinois	—
Kevin Dunn	51	G	6'3"	210	Senior	Winston-Salem, North Carolina	Graduated
Churchill Abass	55	C/F	6'10"	250	Sophomore	Edo State, Nigeria	Transferred to New Orleans

=== Incoming transfers ===
Incoming transfers
Name	Number	Pos.	Height	Weight	Year	Hometown	Previous school
Nate Calmese	1	G	6'2"	181	Senior	Gilbert, Arizona	Washington State
Myles Colvin	6	G	6'5"	212	Junior	Indianapolis, Indiana	Purdue
Mekhi Mason	8	G	6'5"	202	Senior	Gilbert, Arizona	Washington
Sebastian Akins	10	G	6'2"	175	Sophomore	Concord, North Carolina	Denver
Cooper Schwieger	13	F	6'10"	235	Junior	Overland Park, Kansas	Valparaiso

=== 2025 recruiting class ===
College recruiting information
Name	Hometown	School	Height	Weight	Commit date
Isaac Carr; SG	Portland, OR	Central Catholic High School	6 ft 3 in (1.91 m)	170 lb (77 kg)	Sep 17, 2024
Isaac Carr; SG	Recruit ratings: 247Sports: (NR)				
Jaylen Cross; PG	Greensboro, NC	Caldwell Academy	6 ft 4 in (1.93 m)	175 lb (79 kg)	Apr 23, 2025
Jaylen Cross; PG	Recruit ratings: Rivals: 247Sports: ESPN: (NR)				
Overall recruit ranking:
Note: In many cases, Scout, Rivals, 247Sports, On3, and ESPN may conflict in their listings of height and weight.; In these cases, the average was taken. ESPN grades are on a 100-point scale.; Sources: "Wake Forest Demon Deacons". ESPN.; "2025 Team Ranking". Rivals.

== Roster ==
2025–26 Wake Forest Demon Deacons men's basketball team
Players
Coaches

Pos.	#	Name	Height	Weight	Year	Previous school	Hometown
F	0	Omaha Biliew	6 ft 8 in (2.03 m)	230 lb (104 kg)	Jr	Iowa State	Waukee, Iowa
G	1	Nate Calmese	6 ft 2 in (1.88 m)	181 lb (82 kg)	Sr	Washington State	Gilbert, Arizona
G	2	Juke Harris	6 ft 7 in (2.01 m)	200 lb (91 kg)	So	Salisbury High School	Salisbury, North Carolina
G	4	Will Underwood	6 ft 3 in (1.91 m)	180 lb (82 kg)	Jr	Mahtomedi High School	Mahtomedi, Minnesota
G	6	Myles Colvin	6 ft 5 in (1.96 m)	212 lb (96 kg)	Jr	Purdue	Indianapolis, Indiana
G	7	Isaac Carr	6 ft 4 in (1.93 m)	187 lb (85 kg)	Fr	Central Catholic High School	Portland, Oregon
G	8	Mekhi Mason	6 ft 5 in (1.96 m)	202 lb (92 kg)	Sr	Washington	Gilbert, Arizona
F	9	Vincent Ricchiuti	6 ft 6 in (1.98 m)	195 lb (88 kg)	Jr	St. Augustine High School	San Diego, California
G	10	Sebastian Akins	6 ft 2 in (1.88 m)	175 lb (79 kg)	So	Denver	Concord, North Carolina
F	11	Marqus Marion	6 ft 9 in (2.06 m)	220 lb (100 kg)	RS So	BMS Herlev	Skovlunde, Denmark
F	13	Cooper Schwieger	6 ft 10 in (2.08 m)	235 lb (107 kg)	Jr	Valparaiso	Overland Park, Kansas
F	23	Jaylen Cross	6 ft 4 in (1.93 m)	185 lb (84 kg)	Fr	Caldwell Academy	Greensboro, North Carolina
F	25	Tre'Von Spillers	6 ft 7 in (2.01 m)	215 lb (98 kg)	GS	Appalachian State	Charleston, South Carolina
G	30	Anson Beard Jr.	6 ft 5 in (1.96 m)	215 lb (98 kg)	Fr	Lawrenceville School	New York, New York
F	33	Dimitrije Kovacevic	6 ft 8 in (2.03 m)	215 lb (98 kg)	Fr	KK Real Beograd U19	Doboj, Bosnia and Herzegovina

Head coach

- Steve Forbes (Southern Arkansas)

Assistant coach(es)

- BJ McKie (South Carolina)
- Matt Woodley (Drake)
- Nick Friedman (Miami (FL))
- Antanas Kavaliauskas (Texas A&M)
- Darnell Harris (Middle Tennessee)

Legend

- (C) Team captain
- (S) Suspended
- (I) Ineligible
- (W) Walk-on
- Injured
- Current redshirt

Roster
Last update: October 29, 2025

== Schedule and results ==
Date time, TV	Rank^{#}	Opponent^{#}	Result	Record	High points	High rebounds	High assists	Site (attendance) city, state
Exhibition
October 29, 2025*; 7:00 p.m., ESPN+		at East Tennessee State	W 89–70	–	24 – Mason	11 – Spillers	12 – Calmese	Freedom Hall Civic Center (6,392); Johnson City, TN
Non-conference regular season
November 3, 2025*; 8:00 p.m., ACCNX/ESPN+		American	W 88–74	1–0	20 – Tied	10 – Mason	9 – Calmese	LJVM Coliseum (7,023); Winston-Salem, NC
November 7, 2025*; 7:00 p.m., ACCNX/ESPN+		Morehead State	W 81–65	2–0	29 – Harris	10 – Spillers	5 – Akins	LJVM Coliseum (6,689); Winston-Salem, NC
November 11, 2025*; 6:30 p.m., FS1		vs. No. 6 Michigan; Wolverine-Deacon Challenge	L 84–85 ^{OT}	2–1	19 – Harris	7 – Tied	5 – Tied	Little Caesars Arena (7,362); Detroit, MI
November 16, 2025*; 2:00 p.m., ACCNX/ESPN+		UMass Lowell	W 109–65	3–1	21 – Tied	6 – Tied	7 – Calmese	LJVM Coliseum (6,825); Winston-Salem, NC
November 20, 2025*; 8:30 p.m., CBSSN		vs. No. 15 Texas Tech; Baha Mar Championship Semifinals	L 83–84	3–2	26 – Harris	10 – Harris	6 – Calmese	Baha Mar Convention Center (2,437); Nassau, The Bahamas
November 21, 2025*; 7:00 p.m., CBSSN		vs. Memphis; Baha Mar Championship 3rd place game	W 69–68	4–2	24 – Spillers	10 – Harris	4 – Tied	Baha Mar Convention Center (-); Nassau, The Bahamas
November 25, 2025*; 7:00 p.m., ACCNX/ESPN+		Campbell	W 99–51	5–2	17 – Harris	9 – Mason	7 – Calmese	LJVM Coliseum (6,049); Winston-Salem, NC
November 28, 2025*; 12:00 p.m., ACCNX/ESPN+		Northeastern	W 86–73	6–2	17 – Tied	10 – Spillers	4 – Calmese	LJVM Coliseum (6,853); Winston-Salem, NC
December 2, 2025*; 7:00 p.m., ACCN		Oklahoma; ACC–SEC Challenge	L 68–86	6–3	22 – Harris	7 – Harris	4 – Calmese	LJVM Coliseum (7,216); Winston-Salem, NC
December 6, 2025*; 6:00 p.m., ESPN2		vs. West Virginia; Holiday Hoopfest	W 75–66	7–3	28 – Harris	7 – Colvin	9 – Calmese	Charleston Coliseum (10,221); Charleston, WV
December 14, 2025*; 5:00 p.m., ACCNX/ESPN+		Queens	W 111–73	8–3	33 – Colvin	8 – Colvin	4 – Tied	LJVM Coliseum (6,355); Winston-Salem, NC
December 17, 2025*; 7:00 p.m., ACCNX/ESPN+		Longwood	W 71–68	9–3	19 – Harris	8 – Harris	3 – Colvin	LJVM Coliseum (6,172); Winston-Salem, NC
December 21, 2025*; 1:00 p.m., The CW		No. 13 Vanderbilt	L 67–98	9–4	20 – Colvin	12 – Colvin	3 – Calmese	LJVM Coliseum (7,605); Winston-Salem, NC
ACC regular season
December 31, 2025; 12:00 p.m., ESPN2		at NC State; Rivalry	L 57–70	9–5 (0–1)	18 – Biliew	10 – Biliew	3 – Tied	Reynolds Coliseum (16,105); Raleigh, NC
January 3, 2026; 12:00 p.m., ACCN		Virginia Tech	W 81–78	10–5 (1–1)	25 – Calmese	8 – Colvin	7 – Calmese	LJVM Coliseum (8,460); Winston-Salem, NC
January 7, 2026; 7:00 p.m., ESPNU		Miami (FL)	L 77–81	10–6 (1–2)	28 – Harris	8 – Spillers	4 – Tied	LJVM Coliseum (7,869); Winston-Salem, NC
January 10, 2026; 6:00 p.m., ACCN		at No. 17 North Carolina; Rivalry	L 84–87	10–7 (1–3)	28 – Tied	6 – Tied	9 – Calmese	Dean Smith Center (21,750); Chapel Hill, NC
January 17, 2026; 6:00 p.m., ESPN2		at Florida State	W 69–68	11–7 (2–3)	18 – Calmese	9 – Harris	3 – Tied	Donald L. Tucker Civic Center (6,047); Tallahassee, FL
January 20, 2026; 9:00 p.m., ACCN		SMU	L 79–91	11–8 (2–4)	27 – Harris	6 – Harris	6 – Calmese	LJVM Coliseum (7,579); Winston-Salem, NC
January 24, 2026; 12:00 p.m., The CW		at No. 5 Duke	L 69–90	11–9 (2–5)	23 – Harris	3 – Tied	5 – Calmese	Cameron Indoor Stadium (9,314); Durham, NC
January 27, 2026; 6:00 p.m., ACCN		at Pittsburgh	L 76–80 ^{OT}	11–10 (2–6)	18 – Colvin	11 – Schwieger	3 – Akins	Petersen Events Center (4,970); Pittsburgh, PA
January 31, 2026; 3:45 p.m., The CW		NC State; Rivalry	L 78–96	11–11 (2–7)	31 – Harris	7 – Tied	3 – Akins	LJVM Coliseum (5,821); Winston-Salem, NC
February 7, 2026; 12:00 p.m., ACCN		No. 24 Louisville	L 80–88	11–12 (2–8)	25 – Harris	11 – Harris	7 – Spillers	LJVM Coliseum (8,874); Winston-Salem, NC
February 11, 2026; 9:00 p.m., ACCN		at Georgia Tech	W 83–67	12–12 (3–8)	23 – Harris	13 – Harris	4 – Tied	McCamish Pavilion (4,879); Atlanta, GA
February 14, 2026; 4:00 p.m., ACCN		Stanford	W 68–63	13–12 (4–8)	25 – Harris	7 – Harris	3 – Carr	LJVM Coliseum (7,219); Winston-Salem, NC
February 18, 2026; 7:00 p.m., ACCN		Clemson	W 85–77	14–12 (5–8)	20 – Harris	7 – Harris	5 – Carr	LJVM Coliseum (7,433); Winston-Salem, NC
February 21, 2026; 12:00 p.m., ACCN		at Virginia Tech	L 63–82	14–13 (5–9)	16 – Harris	7 – Spillers	4 – Akins	Cassell Coliseum (8,925); Blacksburg, VA
February 25, 2026; 6:00 p.m., ACCN		at Boston College	L 67–68	14–14 (5–10)	38 – Harris	11 – Spillers	3 – Spillers	Conte Forum (2,811); Chestnut Hill, MA
February 28, 2026; 5:45 p.m., The CW		Syracuse	W 88–83	15–14 (6–10)	32 – Colvin	8 – Colvin	5 – Harris	LJVM Coliseum (9,208); Winston-Salem, NC
March 3, 2026; 7:00 p.m., ACCN		at No. 13 Virginia	L 70–75	15–15 (6–11)	26 – Mason	7 – Colvin	3 – Tied	John Paul Jones Arena (12,948); Charlottesville, VA
March 7, 2026; 4:00 p.m., ACCN		California	W 80–73	16–15 (7–11)	31 – Harris	15 – Harris	3 – Tied	LJVM Coliseum (8,514); Winston-Salem, NC
ACC tournament
March 10, 2026*; 7:00 p.m., ACCN	(13)	vs. (12) Virginia Tech; First Round	W 95–89 ^{OT}	17–15	18 – Colvin	6 – Colvin	4 – Mason	Spectrum Center (6,593); Charlotte, NC
March 11, 2026*; 9:30 p.m., ESPN2	(13)	vs. (5) Clemson; Second Round	L 62–71	17–16	22 – Harris	12 – Spillers	4 – Harris	Spectrum Center (9,620); Charlotte, NC
NIT
March 18, 2026*; 7:00 p.m., ESPNU	(1 WS)	Navy; First Round	W 82–72	18–16	26 – Harris	9 – Spillers	5 – Harris	LJVM Coliseum (1,823); Winston-Salem, NC
March 22, 2026*; 4:30 p.m., ESPN2	(1 WS)	(4 WS) Illinois State; Second Round	L 75–78	18–17	24 – Spillers	8 – Tied	5 – Calmese	LJVM Coliseum (1,933); Winston-Salem, NC
*Non-conference game. ^{#}Rankings from AP poll. (#) Tournament seedings in parentheses. WS=Winston-Salem. All times are in Eastern Time.
