= 2025–26 Virginia Tech Hokies men's basketball team =

American college basketball season

2025–26 Virginia Tech Hokies men's basketball
- Conference: Atlantic Coast Conference
- Record: 19–13 (8–10 ACC)
- Head coach: Mike Young (7th season)
- Associate head coach: Chester Frazier (1st, 3rd overall season)
- Assistant coaches: J. D. Byers (3rd season); David Moats (1st season)
- Home arena: Cassell Coliseum

2025–26 ACC men's basketball standings
	Conf.				Overall
Team	W		L	PCT	W		L	PCT
No. 4 Duke †	17	–	1	.944	35	–	3	.921
No. 17 Virginia	15	–	3	.833	30	–	6	.833
No. 24 Miami (FL)	13	–	5	.722	26	–	9	.743
North Carolina	12	–	6	.667	24	–	9	.727
Clemson	12	–	6	.667	24	–	11	.686
No. 23 Louisville	11	–	7	.611	24	–	11	.686
NC State	10	–	8	.556	20	–	14	.588
Florida State	10	–	8	.556	18	–	15	.545
California	9	–	9	.500	22	–	12	.647
Stanford	9	–	9	.500	20	–	13	.606
SMU	8	–	10	.444	20	–	14	.588
Virginia Tech	8	–	10	.444	19	–	13	.594
Wake Forest	7	–	11	.389	18	–	17	.514
Syracuse	6	–	12	.333	15	–	17	.469
Pittsburgh	5	–	13	.278	13	–	20	.394
Notre Dame	4	–	14	.222	13	–	18	.419
Boston College	4	–	14	.222	11	–	20	.355
Georgia Tech	2	–	16	.111	11	–	20	.355
† 2026 ACC tournament winner Rankings from AP Poll

The 2025–26 Virginia Tech Hokies men's basketball team represented Virginia Tech during the 2025–26 NCAA Division I men's basketball season. The Hokies, led by seventh-year head coach Mike Young, played their home games at Cassell Coliseum in Blacksburg, Virginia, as members of the Atlantic Coast Conference.

The Hokies won their first four games, including an overtime victory over Providence in the Hall of Fame Tip-Off. They then traveled to The Bahamas to participate in the Battle 4 Atlantis. The Hokies won their first game of the tournament by two-points over Colorado State. However they lost in the semifinal game 66–77 against Saint Mary's. The finished in fourth place after losing the third place game against VCU. They returned to the US mainland and defeated South Carolina in overtime in their ACC–SEC Challenge game. The team won their last four non-conference games, including an overtime victory against Elon to close out their non-conference schedule. They began ACC play with a triple-overtime thriller against rivals and twenty-first ranked Virginia 95–85. The team experienced a slight hang over after that game, losing their next two. The Hokies then went 3–2 in their next five games, where they only played one ranked team, twenty-third ranked Louisville, who they lost to by fourteen-points. The team could not build momentum as they went 2–3 over their next fine games. They played two ranked games over the stretch, winning against twentieth-ranked Clemson by ten-points and losing to fourth-ranked Duke by fourteen-points. The Hokies finished the season on a 2–4 run, where they defeated Wake Forest and Boston College. They lost to eighteenth-ranked North Carolina and they closed the season with a loss in their rivalry re-match against thirteenth-ranked Virginia.

The Hokies finished the season 19–13 and 8–10 in ACC play to finish in a tie for eleventh place. As the twevlfth-seed in the 2026 ACC tournament they faced thirteenth-seed Wake Forest for the third time in the season. After splitting the regular season series, the Hokies lost in the tournament, 89–95, in overtime. Following the loss, the team announced that they preemptively declined a bid to participate in the NIT, citing team injuries, but declared they would accept a bid to the NCAA tournament. Days later, they were not invited to the NCAA tournament, bringing their season to a close.

== Previous season ==
The Hokies finished the season 13–18 and 8–12 in ACC play to finish in a five-way tie for ninth place. As the tenth seed in the 2025 ACC tournament they faced fifteenth seed California in the First Round. Virginia Tech couldn't repeat their regular season win and were defeated 82–73 in double-overtime. They were not invited to the NCAA tournament or the NIT.

== Offseason ==
=== Departures ===
Departures
Name	Number	Pos.	Height	Weight	Year	Hometown	Reason for departure
Hysier Miller	0	G	6'1"	190	Senior	Philadelphia, Pennsylvania	Graduated
Jaydon Young	3	G	6'4"	205	Sophomore	Goldsboro, North Carolina	Transferred to North Carolina
Rodney Brown Jr.	4	G	6'6"	185	Sophomore	Perris, California	Transferred to Loyola Marymount
Patrick Wessler	5	C	7'0"	250	(redshirt) Sophomore	Matthews, North Carolina	Transferred to UNC Wilmington
Brandon Rechsteiner	7	G	6'1"	190	Sophomore	Acworth, Georgia	Transferred to Colorado State
Peter Carr	8	G	6'5"	205	Freshman	West Chester, Pennsylvania	Transferred to Boston University
Conner Venable	9	G	6'3"	195	Sophomore	Washington, D.C.	Entered transfer portal
Ben Burnham	13	F	6'7"	220	Senior	Fort Mill, South Carolina	Graduated, Entered transfer portal
Ryan Jones Jr.	21	F	6'8"	240	Freshman	Gainesville, Florida	Transferred to Liberty
Connor Serven	22	F	6'8"	225	Graduate Student	Prairie City, Illinois	Graduated
Mylyjael Poteat	34	F	6'9"	260	Graduate Student	Reidsville, North Carolina	Graduated

=== Incoming transfers ===
Incoming transfers
Name	Number	Pos.	Height	Weight	Year	Hometown	Previous school
Jailen Bedford	0	G	6'4"	190	Graduate Student	Austin, Texas	UNLV
Izaiah Pasha	4	G	6'5"	205	Sophomore	Harrisburg, Pennsylvania	Delaware
Amani Hansberry	13	F	6'8"	240	Junior	Silver Spring, Maryland	West Virginia

=== 2025 Recruiting class ===
College recruiting information
Name	Hometown	School	Height	Weight	Commit date
Neoklis Avdalas; G	Kalamata, Greece	Karditsas	6 ft 9 in (2.06 m)	215 lb (98 kg)	Jun 16, 2025
Neoklis Avdalas; G	Recruit ratings: Scout: Rivals: 247Sports: ESPN: (NR)				
Solomon Davis; C	Hyattsville, Maryland	DeMatha Catholic	6 ft 11 in (2.11 m)	225 lb (102 kg)	May 8, 2025
Solomon Davis; C	Recruit ratings: Scout: Rivals: 247Sports: ESPN: (NR)				
Antonio Dorn; C	Hamburg, Germany	VfL Kirchheim	7 ft 0 in (2.13 m)	230 lb (100 kg)	Apr 26, 2025
Antonio Dorn; C	Recruit ratings: Scout: Rivals: 247Sports: ESPN: (NR)				
Brett Freeman; G	Bronx, New York	Ardrey Kell	6 ft 5 in (1.96 m)	180 lb (82 kg)	May 20, 2025
Brett Freeman; G	Recruit ratings: Scout: Rivals: 247Sports: ESPN: (NR)				
Christian Gurdak; C	Charles Town, West Virginia	Gonzaga College	6 ft 10 in (2.08 m)	260 lb (120 kg)	Jul 2, 2024
Christian Gurdak; C	Recruit ratings: Scout: Rivals: 247Sports: ESPN: (80)				
Sin'Cere Jones; F	Portsmouth, Virginia	Churchland	6 ft 7 in (2.01 m)	230 lb (100 kg)	Jun 16, 2024
Sin'Cere Jones; F	Recruit ratings: Scout: Rivals: 247Sports: ESPN: (NR)				
Shamarius Peterkin; G	Winston-Salem, North Carolina	Mount Tabor	6 ft 3 in (1.91 m)	174 lb (79 kg)	Aug 16, 2024
Shamarius Peterkin; G	Recruit ratings: Scout: Rivals: 247Sports: ESPN: (NR)				
Overall recruit ranking: Scout: 84 247Sports: 39 ESPN: NR
Note: In many cases, Scout, Rivals, 247Sports, On3, and ESPN may conflict in their listings of height and weight.; In these cases, the average was taken. ESPN grades are on a 100-point scale.; Sources: "2025 Virginia Tech Basketball Commitment List". Rivals.; "Virginia Tech 2025 Basketball Commits". Scout.; "Virginia Tech". ESPN.; "Scout.com Team Recruiting Rankings". Scout.; "2025 Team Ranking". Rivals.

== Roster ==
2025–26 Virginia Tech Hokies men's basketball team
Players
Coaches

Pos.	#	Name	Height	Weight	Year	Previous school	Hometown
G	0	Jailen Bedford	6 ft 4 in (1.93 m)	190 lb (86 kg)	GS	Hutto; UNLV	Austin, TX
F	1	Tobi Lawal	6 ft 8 in (2.03 m)	215 lb (98 kg)	Sr	Lee Academy; VCU	London, ENG
G	2	Jaden Schutt	6 ft 5 in (1.96 m)	200 lb (91 kg)	RS Jr	Yorkville; Duke	Yorkville, IL
G	3	Ben Hammond	5 ft 11 in (1.8 m)	170 lb (77 kg)	So	Paul VI	Manassas, VA
G	4	Izaiah Pasha	6 ft 5 in (1.96 m)	205 lb (93 kg)	So	Cardinal O'Hara; Delaware	Harrisburg, PA
F	5	Sin'Cere Jones	6 ft 7 in (2.01 m)	230 lb (104 kg)	Fr	Churchland	Portsmouth, VA
G	7	Brett Freeman	6 ft 5 in (1.96 m)	180 lb (82 kg)	Fr	Ardrey Kell	Bronx, NY
G	10	Tyler Johnson	6 ft 5 in (1.96 m)	210 lb (95 kg)	So	Oak Ridge	Orlando, FL
F	13	Amani Hansberry	6 ft 8 in (2.03 m)	240 lb (109 kg)	Jr	Mount Saint Joseph; West Virginia	Silver Spring, MD
G	15	Shamarius Peterkin	6 ft 3 in (1.91 m)	174 lb (79 kg)	Fr	Mount Tabor	Winston-Salem, NC
G	17	Neoklis Avdalas	6 ft 9 in (2.06 m)	215 lb (98 kg)	Fr	Karditsas	Kalamata, GRE
C	22	Solomon Davis	6 ft 11 in (2.11 m)	225 lb (102 kg)	Fr	DeMatha Catholic	Hyattsville, MD
C	32	Christian Gurdak	6 ft 10 in (2.08 m)	260 lb (118 kg)	Fr	Gonzaga College	Charles Town, WV
C	77	Antonio Dorn	7 ft 0 in (2.13 m)	230 lb (104 kg)	Fr	VfL Kirchheim	Hamburg, GER

Head coach

- Mike Young (Emory & Henry)

Assistant coach(es)

- Chester Frazier (Illinois)
- J. D. Byers (Lebanon Valley)
- David Moats (Wyoming)

Legend

- (C) Team captain
- (S) Suspended
- (I) Ineligible
- (W) Walk-on
- Injured
- Current redshirt

Roster
Last update: November 2, 2025

== Schedule and results ==
Date time, TV	Rank^{#}	Opponent^{#}	Result	Record	High points	High rebounds	High assists	Site (attendance) city, state
Exhibition
October 25, 2025*; 1:00 p.m.		Duquesne	L 81–83	—	22 – Hammond	8 – Lawal	4 – Tied	Cassell Coliseum (4,623); Blacksburg, VA
Non-conference regular season
November 3, 2025*; 7:00 p.m., ACCNX		Charleston Southern	W 98–67	1–0	20 – Lawal	13 – Hansberry	9 – Avdalas	Cassell Coliseum (4,488); Blacksburg, VA
November 8, 2025*; 4:00 p.m., Peacock		vs. Providence; Hall of Fame Tip-Off	W 107–101 ^{OT}	2–0	33 – Avdalas	13 – Lawal	6 – Avadalas	Mohegan Sun Arena; Uncasville, CT
November 12, 2025*; 7:00 p.m., ACCNX		Saint Joseph's	W 94–59	3–0	19 – Hansberry	7 – Lawal	7 – Avdalas	Cassell Coliseum (5,246); Blacksburg, VA
November 16, 2025*; 2:00 p.m., ACCNX		Charlotte	W 84–76	4–0	21 – Bedford	15 – Lawal	3 – Tied	Cassell Coliseum (5,295); Blacksburg, VA
November 19, 2025*; 7:00 p.m., ACCNX		Bryant	W 78–61	5–0	18 – Lawal	13 – Lawal	6 – Hammond	Cassell Coliseum (5,410); Blacksburg, VA
November 26, 2025*; 5:00 p.m., ESPNU		vs. Colorado State; Battle 4 Atlantis Quarterfinals	W 66–64	6–0	17 – Bedford	12 – Johnson	3 – Tied	Imperial Arena (1,081); Paradise Island, Bahamas
November 27, 2025*; 2:30 p.m., ESPN		vs. Saint Mary's; Battle 4 Atlantis Semifinals	L 66–77	6–1	18 – Hansberry	10 – Hansberry	6 – Hammond	Imperial Arena (258); Paradise Island, Bahamas
November 28, 2025*; 10:30 a.m., ESPN2		vs. VCU; Battle 4 Atlantis 3rd place game	L 68–86	6–2	16 – Tied	5 – Dorn	5 – Tied	Imperial Arena (485); Paradise Island, Bahamas
December 2, 2025*; 7:00 p.m., SECN		at South Carolina; ACC–SEC Challenge	W 86–83 ^{OT}	7–2	22 – Hansberry	14 – Hansberry	8 – Avdalas	Colonial Life Arena (11,420); Columbia, SC
December 6, 2025*; 3:00 p.m., ACCNX		George Mason	W 73–62	8–2	18 – Schutt	7 – Hansberry	6 – Tied	Cassell Coliseum (6,463); Blacksburg, VA
December 11, 2025*; 7:00 p.m., ACCNX		Western Carolina	W 96–74	9–2	30 – Avdalas	7 – Gurdak	6 – Hansberry	Cassell Coliseum (4,288); Blacksburg, VA
December 14, 2025*; 12:00 p.m., ACCNX		Maryland Eastern Shore	W 82–53	10–2	16 – Avdalas	9 – Hansberry	7 – Avdalas	Cassell Coliseum (4,317); Blacksburg, VA
December 20, 2025*; 2:00 p.m., ACCNX		Elon	W 82–81 ^{OT}	11–2	20 – Hansberry	14 – Hansberry	3 – Tied	Cassell Coliseum (4,380); Blacksburg, VA
ACC regular season
December 31, 2025; 2:00 p.m., ACCN		No. 21 Virginia; Rivalry	W 95–85 ^{3OT}	12–2 (1–0)	30 – Hammond	19 – Gurdak	5 – Hammond	Cassell Coliseum (8,925); Blacksburg, VA
January 3, 2026; 12:00 p.m., ACCN		at Wake Forest	L 78–81	12–3 (1–1)	25 – Bedford	10 – Hansberry	7 – Avdalas	LJVM Coliseum (8,460); Winston-Salem, NC
January 7, 2026; 7:00 p.m., ACCN		Stanford	L 68–69	12–4 (1–2)	21 – Avdalas	11 – Hansberry	3 – Avdalas	Cassell Coliseum (5,427); Blacksburg, VA
January 10, 2026; 4:00 p.m., ACCN		California	W 78–75	13–4 (2–2)	15 – Hansberry	9 – Hansberry	6 – Avdalas	Cassell Coliseum (5,323); Blacksburg, VA
January 14, 2026; 9:00 p.m., ESPNU		at SMU	L 76–77	13–5 (2–3)	22 – Bedford	8 – Tied	6 – Avdalas	Moody Coliseum (5,048); University Park, TX
January 17, 2026; 12:00 p.m., ACCN		Notre Dame	W 89–76	14–5 (3–3)	22 – Lawal	11 – Lawal	7 – Avdalas	Cassell Coliseum (8,925); Blacksburg, VA
January 21, 2026; 9:00 p.m., ACCN		at Syracuse	W 76–74	15–5 (4–3)	24 – Hammond	11 – Lawal	4 – Hammond	JMA Wireless Dome (18,738); Syracuse, NY
January 24, 2026; 2:15 p.m., The CW		at No. 23 Louisville	L 71–85	15–6 (4–4)	24 – Bedford	9 – Lawal	5 – Hammond	KFC Yum! Center (14,907); Louisville, KY
January 27, 2026; 8:00 p.m., ACCN		Georgia Tech	W 71–65	16–6 (5–4)	20 – Hammond	8 – Hansberry	4 – Bedford	Cassell Coliseum (7,769); Blacksburg, VA
January 31, 2026; 12:00 p.m., ESPN		No. 4 Duke	L 58–72	16–7 (5–5)	20 – Hansberry	5 – Hammond	4 – Avdalas	Cassell Coliseum (8,925); Blacksburg, VA
February 7, 2026; 12:00 p.m., The CW		at NC State	L 73–82	16–8 (5–6)	19 – Hansberry	15 – Lawal	4 – Tied	Lenovo Center (19,119); Raleigh, NC
February 11, 2026; 7:00 p.m., ACCN		at No. 20 Clemson	W 76–66	17–8 (6–6)	23 – Bedford	9 – Lawal	4 – Avdalas	Littlejohn Coliseum (7,392); Clemson, SC
February 14, 2026; 2:00 p.m., ACCN		Florida State	L 69–92	17–9 (6–7)	16 – Tied	7 – Lawal	4 – Bedford	Cassell Coliseum (8,925); Blacksburg, VA
February 17, 2026; 8:00 p.m., ACCN		at Miami (FL)	L 66–67	17–10 (6–8)	16 – Hansberry	7 – Lawal	8 – Avdalas	Watsco Center (7,639); Coral Gables, FL
February 21, 2026; 12:00 p.m., ACCN		Wake Forest	W 82–63	18–10 (7–8)	17 – Tied	9 – Lawal	7 – Avdalas	Cassell Coliseum (8,925); Blacksburg, VA
February 28, 2026; 8:30 p.m., ESPN2		at No. 18 North Carolina	L 82–89	18–11 (7–9)	19 – Avdalas	5 – Lawal	5 – Tied	Dean Smith Center (21,750); Chapel Hill, NC
March 3, 2026; 9:00 p.m., ESPNU		Boston College	W 72–63	19–11 (8–9)	20 – Lawal	7 – Tied	3 – Avdalas	Cassell Coliseum (5,071); Blacksburg, VA
March 7, 2026; 12:00 p.m., The CW		at No. 13 Virginia; Rivalry	L 72–76	19–12 (8–10)	21 – Hammond	7 – Lawal	5 – Hammond	John Paul Jones Arena (14,637); Charlottesville, VA
ACC tournament
March 10, 2026; 7:00 p.m., ACCN	(12)	vs. (13) Wake Forest; First round	L 89–95 ^{OT}	19–13	23 – Hammond	9 – Lawal	3 – Tied	Spectrum Center (6,593); Charlotte, NC
*Non-conference game. ^{#}Rankings from AP poll. (#) Tournament seedings in parentheses. All times are in Eastern Time.
