= 2025–26 Clemson Tigers men's basketball team =

American college basketball team

2025–26 Clemson Tigers men's basketball

Charleston Classic Palmetto Bracket champions

NCAA tournament, First round
- Conference: Atlantic Coast Conference
- Record: 24–11 (12–6 ACC)
- Head coach: Brad Brownell (16th season)
- Associate head coach: Billy Donlon (4th season)
- Assistant coaches: Sean Dixon (4th season); Dick Bender (10th season)
- Home arena: Littlejohn Coliseum (Capacity: 9,000)

2025–26 ACC men's basketball standings
	Conf.				Overall
Team	W		L	PCT	W		L	PCT
No. 4 Duke †	17	–	1	.944	35	–	3	.921
No. 17 Virginia	15	–	3	.833	30	–	6	.833
No. 24 Miami (FL)	13	–	5	.722	26	–	9	.743
North Carolina	12	–	6	.667	24	–	9	.727
Clemson	12	–	6	.667	24	–	11	.686
No. 23 Louisville	11	–	7	.611	24	–	11	.686
NC State	10	–	8	.556	20	–	14	.588
Florida State	10	–	8	.556	18	–	15	.545
California	9	–	9	.500	22	–	12	.647
Stanford	9	–	9	.500	20	–	13	.606
SMU	8	–	10	.444	20	–	14	.588
Virginia Tech	8	–	10	.444	19	–	13	.594
Wake Forest	7	–	11	.389	18	–	17	.514
Syracuse	6	–	12	.333	15	–	17	.469
Pittsburgh	5	–	13	.278	13	–	20	.394
Notre Dame	4	–	14	.222	13	–	18	.419
Boston College	4	–	14	.222	11	–	20	.355
Georgia Tech	2	–	16	.111	11	–	20	.355
† 2026 ACC tournament winner Rankings from AP Poll

The 2025–26 Clemson Tigers men's basketball team represented Clemson University during the 2025–26 NCAA Division I men's basketball season. The Tigers were led by sixteenth-year head coach Brad Brownell, and played their home games at Littlejohn Coliseum in Clemson, South Carolina as members of the Atlantic Coast Conference.

Clemson started the season by winning three straight games, all by more than twenty-five points, but all against non-Power 4 competition. Their first loss of the season came at Georgetown 74–79. They followed that by winning four straight games, a stretch that included victories in the Charleston Classic Palmetto Bracket. In Charelston, the Tigers defeated West Virginia by three points and Georgia, also by three, in overtime. Clemson faced their first ranked opponent of the year in number twelve Alabama in the ACC–SEC Challenge. The Tigers lost in Tuscaloosa 84–90. They followed that with a neutral site loss against number ten BYU 64–67. The Tigers led by as many as twenty-two points in the second half, but could not close the game out as BYU sunk a three as time expired to secure the victory. Clemson won its last three non-conference games, including a rivalry victory over South Carolina. The Tigers began ACC play by winning six straight games. The highlight of the streak was a four-point victory over then number twenty-four SMU. After their first four victories, the Tigers entered the AP poll at number twenty-two. They rose to number eighteen, where they suffered their first conference loss of the season, against NC State in overtime. They followed that with four straight victories, including winning at both California and Stanford. At the end of the streak, the tigers were ranked number twenty in the AP poll. They then suffered four straight defeats, including a game at number four Duke. They broke the streak by defeating number twenty-four Louisville 80–75. They lost to number seventeen North Carolina and defeated Georgia Tech 79–76 to end the regular season.

The Tigers finished the season 24–11 and 12–6 in ACC play to finish in a tie for fourth place. As the fifth seed in the 2026 ACC tournament earned a bye into Second round where they defeated thirteenth seed Wake Forest, avenging a loss from the regular season. In the Quarterfinals they avenged another regular season loss, defeating fourth seed and number nineteen North Carolina. They faced first seed and number one Duke in the Semifinal, where theylost 61–73. They received an at-large bid to the NCAA Tournament. The Tigers were an eight-seed in the South regional. They were defeated 61–67 by ninth-seed Iowa in the First round.

== Previous season ==
The Tigers finished the season 27–7 and 18–2 in ACC play to finish in a tie for second place. As the third seed in the 2025 ACC tournament earned a bye into Quarterfinals where they defeated sixth seed SMU. In the Semifinals they could not avenge a regular season loss to Louisville as they lost by three points. They received an at-large bid to the NCAA Tournament. The Tigers were a five-seed in the Midwest regional. They were upset 69–67 by twelfth-seed McNeese in the First round. The Tigers mounted a comeback after being down 31–13 at halftime of the game, but they fell just short.

== Offseason ==
=== Departures ===
Clemson Departures
Name	Number	Pos.	Height	Weight	Year	Hometown	Reason for departure
Viktor Lakhin	0	C	6'11"	245	(redshirt) Senior	Anapa, Russia	Graduated
Chase Hunter	1	G	6'4"	202	Graduate Student	Atlanta, Georgia	Graduated
Jake Heidbreder	3	G	6'5"	180	(redshirt) Junior	Floyds Knobs, Indiana	Transferred to Fresno State
Ian Schieffelin	4	F	6'8"	240	Senior	Loganville, Georgia	Joined Clemson football
Asa Thomas	5	F	6'7"	200	(redshirt) Freshman	Lake Forest, Illinois	Transferred to Furman
Myles Foster	6	F	6'7"	245	Graduate Student	Brooklyn, New York	Graduated
Chauncey Wiggins	7	F	6'10"	216	Junior	Covington, Georgia	Transferred to Florida State
Del Jones	10	G	6'2"	187	Freshman	Landover, Maryland	Transferred to Radford
Jaeden Zackery	11	G	6'11"	218	Graduate Student	Salem, Wisconsin	Graduated
Andrew Latiff	13	G	6'5"	195	Senior	Clemson, South Carolina	Graduated
Christian Reeves	14	C	7'1"	261	(redshirt) Sophomore	Charlotte, North Carolina	Transferred to Charleston
Matt Kelly	20	G	6'2"	175	Senior	Charleston, South Carolina	Graduated
Daniel Nauseef	32	G	6'7"	220	Senior	Dayton, Ohio	Graduated
Jackson Roberts	35	F/C	6'11"	247	Freshman	Tampa, Florida	Entered transfer portal

=== Incoming transfers ===
Clemson incoming transfers
Name	Number	Pos.	Height	Weight	Year	Hometown	Previous school
RJ Godfrey	0	F	6'8"	230	Senior	Suwanee, Georgia	Georgia
Jestin Porter	1	G	6'1"	180	Graduate Student	Houston, Texas	Middle Tennessee
Butta Johnson	4	G	6'4"	180	Senior	Hunstville, Alabama	UAB
Jake Wahlin	10	F	6'10"	212	Junior	Provo, Utah	Utah
Nick Davidson	11	F/C	6'10"	238	(redshirt) Senior	Mission Viejo, California	Nevada
Carter Welling	22	F	6'10"	225	Junior	Draper, Utah	Utah Valley

=== 2025 recruiting class ===
College recruiting
Name	Hometown	School	Height	Weight	Commit date
Blake Davidson; F	Mission Viejo, California	Mater Dei	6 ft 9 in (2.06 m)	200 lb (91 kg)	Apr 2, 2025
Blake Davidson; F	Recruit ratings: Scout: Rivals: 247Sports: ESPN: (NR)				
Zac Foster; G	Atlanta, Georgia	Woodward Academy	6 ft 4 in (1.93 m)	180 lb (82 kg)	Sep 12, 2024
Zac Foster; G	Recruit ratings: Scout: Rivals: 247Sports: ESPN: (79)				
Trent Steinour; F/C	Huntersville, North Carolina	Lake Norman	6 ft 10 in (2.08 m)	215 lb (98 kg)	May 23, 2024
Trent Steinour; F/C	Recruit ratings: Scout: Rivals: 247Sports: ESPN: (79)				
Chase Thompson; F	Glenwood, Minnesota	Alexandria Area	6 ft 8 in (2.03 m)	215 lb (98 kg)	Sep 29, 2024
Chase Thompson; F	Recruit ratings: Scout: Rivals: 247Sports: ESPN: (78)				
Overall recruit ranking: Scout: 37 Rivals: 40 ESPN: NR
Note: In many cases, Scout, Rivals, 247Sports, On3, and ESPN may conflict in their listings of height and weight.; In these cases, the average was taken. ESPN grades are on a 100-point scale.; Sources: "2025 Clemson Basketball Commitment List". Rivals.; "Clemson 2025 Basketball Commits". Scout.; "Clemson Tigers". ESPN.; "Scout.com Team Recruiting Rankings". Scout.; "2025 Team Ranking". Rivals.

== Roster ==
2025–26 Clemson Tigers men's basketball team
Players
Coaches

Pos.	#	Name	Height	Weight	Year	Previous school	Hometown
F	0	RJ Godfrey	6 ft 8 in (2.03 m)	230 lb (104 kg)	Sr	North Gwinnett	Suwanee, Georgia
G	1	Jestin Porter	6 ft 1 in (1.85 m)	180 lb (82 kg)	GS	Cypress Ridge	Houston, Texas
G	2	Dillon Hunter	6 ft 3 in (1.91 m)	192 lb (87 kg)	Sr	Westlake	Atlanta, Georgia
G	3	Chase Thompson	6 ft 8 in (2.03 m)	215 lb (98 kg)	Fr	Alexandria Area	Glenwood, Minnesota
G	4	Butta Johnson	6 ft 4 in (1.93 m)	180 lb (82 kg)	Sr	Grissom	Huntsville, Alabama
G	5	Zach Foster	6 ft 4 in (1.93 m)	180 lb (82 kg)	Fr	Woodward Academy	Atlanta, Georgia
F	8	Dallas Thomas	6 ft 9 in (2.06 m)	180 lb (82 kg)	RS Fr	Parkview Magnet	Little Rock, Arkansas
F	10	Jake Wahlin	6 ft 10 in (2.08 m)	212 lb (96 kg)	Jr	Timpview	Provo, Utah
F/C	11	Nick Davidson	6 ft 10 in (2.08 m)	238 lb (108 kg)	RS Sr	Mater Dei	Mission Viejo, California
F	14	Blake Davidson	6 ft 9 in (2.06 m)	200 lb (91 kg)	Fr	Mater Dei	Mission Viejo, California
G	21	Ace Buckner	6 ft 3 in (1.91 m)	170 lb (77 kg)	RS Fr	La Lumiere	Dallas, Texas
F	22	Carter Welling (injured)	6 ft 10 in (2.08 m)	225 lb (102 kg)	Jr	Corner Canyon	Draper, Utah
F/C	44	Trent Steinour	6 ft 10 in (2.08 m)	215 lb (98 kg)	Fr	Lake Norman	Huntersville, North Carolina

Head coach

- Brad Brownell (DePauw)

Assistant coach(es)

- Billy Donlon (UNC Wilmington)
- Sean Dixon (Presbyterian)
- Dick Bender (McDaniel)

Legend

- (C) Team captain
- (S) Suspended
- (I) Ineligible
- (W) Walk-on
- Injured
- Current redshirt

Roster

== Schedule and results ==
Date time, TV	Rank^{#}	Opponent^{#}	Result	Record	High points	High rebounds	High assists	Site (attendance) city, state
Exhibition
October 17, 2025*; 6:00 p.m.		Presbyterian	W 83–44	–	15 – Porter	8 – Welling	3 – Thompson	Littlejohn Coliseum (2,209); Clemson, SC
Non-conference regular season
November 3, 2025*; 7:00 p.m., ACCNX		New Hampshire	W 88–38	1–0	18 – Buckner	9 – Godfrey	3 – Godfrey	Littlejohn Coliseum (7,439); Clemson, SC
November 7, 2025*; 7:00 p.m., ACCN		Gardner–Webb	W 97–59	2–0	18 – N. Davidson	11 – Welling	5 – Foster	Littlejohn Coliseum (7,217); Clemson, SC
November 11, 2025*; 7:00 p.m., ACCNX		Morehead State	W 83–56	3–0	14 – Wahlin	11 – Godfrey	4 – Hunter	Littlejohn Coliseum (6,357); Clemson, SC
November 15, 2025*; 12:00 p.m., Peacock		at Georgetown	L 74–79	3–1	14 – Welling	7 – Wahlin	4 – Foster	Capital One Arena (8,562); Washington, D.C.
November 17, 2025*; 9:00 p.m, ACCN		North Alabama	W 81–61	4–1	16 – Godfrey	10 – Wahlin	6 – Foster	Littlejohn Coliseum (6,356); Clemson, SC
November 21, 2025*; 6:30 p.m., ESPNU		vs. West Virginia; Charleston Classic Palmetto Bracket Semifinal	W 70–67	5–1	14 – Tied	8 – Welling	4 – Hunter	TD Arena (4,856); Charleston, SC
November 23, 2025*; 1:00 p.m., ESPN		vs. Georgia; Charleston Classic Palmetto Bracket Championship	W 97–94 ^{OT}	6–1	18 – Porter	9 – N. Davidson	2 – Tied	TD Arena (3,823); Charleston, SC
November 28, 2025*; 7:00 p.m., ACCNX		Alabama A&M	W 92–56	7–1	14 – Porter	8 – Godfrey	3 – Tied	Littlejohn Coliseum (6,118); Clemson, SC
December 3, 2025*; 7:15 p.m., ESPNU		at No. 12 Alabama; ACC–SEC Challenge	L 84–90	7–2	19 – Godfrey	6 – Wahlin	4 – Hunter	Coleman Coliseum (13,474); Tuscaloosa, AL
December 9, 2025*; 6:30 p.m., ESPN		vs. No. 10 BYU; Jimmy V Classic	L 64–67	7–3	17 – Porter	6 – Welling	4 – Porter	Madison Square Garden (19,694); New York, NY
December 13, 2025*; 3:00 p.m., ACCNX		Mercer	W 70–63	8–3	15 – Hunter	8 – Godfrey	2 – Tied	Littlejohn Coliseum (6,129); Clemson, SC
December 16, 2025*; 7:00 P.M., ESPN		South Carolina; Rivalry	W 68–61	9–3	19 – Buckner	7 – Buckner	6 – Hunter	Littlejohn Coliseum (9,000); Clemson, SC
December 21, 2025*; 3:00 p.m., ESPN		vs. Cincinnati; Greenville Winter Invitational	W 68–65	10–3	12 – Tied	7 – Hunter	4 – Hunter	Bon Secours Wellness Arena (4,065); Greenville, SC
ACC regular season
December 31, 2025; 2:00 p.m., ESPN2		at Syracuse	W 64–61	11–3 (1–0)	14 – Godfrey	5 – Tied	2 – Tied	JMA Wireless Dome (16,425); Syracuse, NY
January 3, 2026; 12:00 p.m., The CW		at Pittsburgh	W 73–68	12–3 (2–0)	21 – Porter	10 – Welling	4 – Hunter	Petersen Events Center (6,652); Pittsburgh, PA
January 7, 2026; 9:00 p.m., ESPNU		No. 24 SMU	W 74–70	13–3 (3–0)	17 – Godfrey	8 – Wahlin	4 – Tied	Littlejohn Coliseum (8,134); Clemson, SC
January 10, 2026; 6:00 p.m., ESPN2		at Notre Dame	W 76–61	14–3 (4–0)	26 – Porter	7 – Hunter	3 – Tied	Joyce Center (6,933); South Bend, IN
January 13, 2026; 7:00 p.m., ACCN	No. 22	Boston College	W 74–50	15–3 (5–0)	25 – N. Davidson	8 – Tied	5 – Hunter	Littlejohn Coliseum (7,320); Clemson, SC
January 17, 2026; 2:15 p.m., The CW	No. 22	Miami (FL)	W 69–59	16–3 (6–0)	18 – Welling	9 – Welling	7 – Hunter	Littlejohn Coliseum (9,000); Clemson, SC
January 20, 2026; 7:00 p.m., ACCN	No. 18	NC State	L 76–80 ^{OT}	16–4 (6–1)	16 – Godfrey	9 – Welling	5 – Hunter	Littlejohn Coliseum (9,000); Clemson, SC
January 24, 2026; 12:00 p.m., ACCN	No. 18	at Georgia Tech	W 77–63	17–4 (7–1)	13 – Tied	8 – Wahlin	4 – Buckner	McCamish Pavilion (6,781); Atlanta, GA
January 31, 2026; 12:00 p.m., ACCN	No. 22	Pittsburgh	W 63–52	18–4 (8–1)	12 – Tied	6 – Hunter	4 – Buckner	Littlejohn Coliseum (6,723); Clemson, SC
February 4, 2026; 10:00 p.m., ACCN	No. 20	at Stanford	W 66–64	19–4 (9–1)	16 – N. Davidson	8 – Welling	4 – Hunter	Maples Pavilion (3,466); Stanford, CA
February 7, 2026; 8:00 p.m., ACCN	No. 20	at California	W 77–55	20–4 (10–1)	13 – Tied	6 – Wahlin	4 – Buckner	Haas Pavilion (5,629); Berkeley, CA
February 11, 2026; 7:00 p.m., ACCN	No. 20	Virginia Tech	L 66–76	20–5 (10–2)	19 – Welling	6 – Welling	2 – Tied	Littlejohn Coliseum (7,392); Clemson, SC
February 14, 2026; 12:00 p.m., ESPN	No. 20	at No. 4 Duke	L 54–67	20–6 (10–3)	12 – Welling	8 – Godfrey	2 – Tied	Cameron Indoor Stadium (9,314); Durham, NC
February 18, 2026; 7:00 p.m., ACCN		at Wake Forest	L 77–85	20–7 (10–4)	17 – Wahlin	7 – Welling	3 – Tied	LJVM Coliseum (7,433); Winston-Salem, NC
February 21, 2026; 12:00 p.m., The CW		Florida State	L 65–70	20–8 (10–5)	15 – Buckner	7 – Wahlin	3 – Tied	Littlejohn Coliseum (8,241); Clemson, SC
February 28, 2026; 2:00 p.m., ESPN2		No. 24 Louisville	W 80–75	21–8 (11–5)	16 – Porter	8 – Buckner	3 – Porter	Littlejohn Coliseum (8,084); Clemson, SC
March 3, 2026; 7:00 p.m., ESPN		at No. 17 North Carolina	L 63–67	21–9 (11–6)	22 – Godfrey	9 – Godfrey	4 – Hunter	Dean Smith Center (20,753); Chapel Hill, NC
March 7, 2026; 12:00 p.m., ACCN		Georgia Tech	W 79–76	22–9 (12–6)	15 – Tied	6 – Godfrey	5 – Tied	Littlejohn Coliseum (6,977); Clemson, SC
ACC Tournament
March 11, 2026; 9:30 p.m., ESPN2	(5)	vs. (13) Wake Forest; Second round	W 71–62	23–9	11 – Godfrey	8 – Godfrey	3 – Tied	Spectrum Center (9,620); Charlotte, NC
March 12, 2026; 9:30 p.m., ESPN	(5)	vs. (4) No. 19 North Carolina; Quarterfinal	W 80–79	24–9	17 – N. Davidson	11 – N. Davidson	3 – Tied	Spectrum Center (17,627); Charlotte, NC
March 13, 2026; 9:30 p.m., ESPN2	(5)	vs. (1) No. 1 Duke; Semifinal	L 61–73	24–10	18 – Godfrey	6 – Godfrey	4 – Hunter	Spectrum Center (17,711); Charlotte, NC
NCAA Tournament
March 20, 2026; 6:50 p.m., TNT	(8 S)	vs. (9 S) Iowa; First round	L 61–67	24–11	15 – Godfrey	7 – Godfrey	3 – Tied	Benchmark International Arena (20,112); Tampa, FL
*Non-conference game. ^{#}Rankings from AP poll. (#) Tournament seedings in parentheses. S=South. All times are in Eastern Time.

== Rankings ==
Ranking movements Legend: ██ Increase in ranking ██ Decrease in ranking — = Not ranked RV = Received votes
	Week																				
Poll	Pre	1	2	3	4	5	6	7	8	9	10	11	12	13	14	15	16	17	18	19	Final
AP	—	—	—	RV	RV	RV	RV	RV	RV	RV	22	18	22	20	20	RV	—	RV	—	RV	—
Coaches	—	RV	—	RV	RV	RV	RV	RV	RV	RV	21	18	19	19	18	24	RV	RV	—	—	—

== Statistics ==
Player	GP	GS	MPG	FG%	3P%	FT%	RPG	APG	PPG
RJ Godfrey	35	32	25.2	61.1%	20.0%	66.0%	5.3	1.6	12.0
Carter Welling	32	24	20.8	49.3%	29.3%	70.1%	5.4	1.1	10.2
Jestin Porter	35	31	27.0	37.3%	34.8%	76.2%	1.8	1.3	9.6
Nick Davidson	35	12	22.0	51.1%	34.5%	67.4%	4.0	1.1	9.1
Ace Buckner	35	3	19.5	42.9%	31.2%	81.3%	2.9	1.8	8.3
Dillon Hunter	35	35	28.6	41.1%	34.7%	78.6%	3.7	3.0	7.5
Zac Foster	12	0	18.6	31.0%	27.7%	81.8%	2.8	2.5	6.9
Efrem Johnson	35	9	21.1	38.5%	35.5%	83.0%	2.1	1.0	6.3
Jake Wahlin	35	29	20.4	40.3%	34.0%	68.8%	3.9	0.7	5.3
Chase Thompson	35	0	9.0	52.8%	40.0%	68.4%	1.1	0.3	2.3
Dallas Thomas	22	0	4.5	51.6%	57.1%	62.5%	0.4	0.1	2.2
Trent Steinour	6	0	2.5	25.0%	—	66.7%	1.2	—	1.0
