= 2025–26 Syracuse Orange men's basketball team =

American college basketball season

2025–26 Syracuse Orange men's basketball
- Conference: Atlantic Coast Conference
- Record: 15–17 (6–12 ACC)
- Head coach: Adrian Autry (3rd season)
- Assistant coaches: Dan Engelstad; Allen Griffin; Brenden Straughn
- Home arena: JMA Wireless Dome

2025–26 ACC men's basketball standings
	Conf.				Overall
Team	W		L	PCT	W		L	PCT
No. 4 Duke †	17	–	1	.944	35	–	3	.921
No. 17 Virginia	15	–	3	.833	30	–	6	.833
No. 24 Miami (FL)	13	–	5	.722	26	–	9	.743
North Carolina	12	–	6	.667	24	–	9	.727
Clemson	12	–	6	.667	24	–	11	.686
No. 23 Louisville	11	–	7	.611	24	–	11	.686
NC State	10	–	8	.556	20	–	14	.588
Florida State	10	–	8	.556	18	–	15	.545
California	9	–	9	.500	22	–	12	.647
Stanford	9	–	9	.500	20	–	13	.606
SMU	8	–	10	.444	20	–	14	.588
Virginia Tech	8	–	10	.444	19	–	13	.594
Wake Forest	7	–	11	.389	18	–	17	.514
Syracuse	6	–	12	.333	15	–	17	.469
Pittsburgh	5	–	13	.278	13	–	20	.394
Notre Dame	4	–	14	.222	13	–	18	.419
Boston College	4	–	14	.222	11	–	20	.355
Georgia Tech	2	–	16	.111	11	–	20	.355
† 2026 ACC tournament winner Rankings from AP Poll

The 2025–26 Syracuse Orange men's basketball team represented Syracuse University during the 2025–26 NCAA Division I men's basketball season. The Orange, led by third-year head coach Adrian Autry, played their home games at JMA Wireless Dome in Syracuse, New York as 13th-year members of the Atlantic Coast Conference.

The Orange began the season with a four-game winning streak against non-Power 4 opponents before traveling to Paradise, Nevada to participate in the Players Era Festival. They lost the first game of the tournament against third-ranked Houston, in overtime. The team lost two more games in the tournament, one to Kansas and the second to fifteenth-ranked Iowa State. Syracuse returned to New York to defeat thirteenth-ranked Tennessee by two points in the ACC–SEC Challenge. The Orange finished the non-conference regular season on a 4–1 run, with their only loss coming against Hofstra. They began the ACC season with a three-point loss to Clemson. The team rebounded by winning their next three games, including road wins against Georgia Tech and Pittsburgh. They could not carry the momentum as they lost their next four straight games, including an overtime loss at Boston College. The team broke the streak with a defeat of Notre Dame. The Orange went 2–2 over their next four games, defeating California in a double-overtime thriller and SMU by one point. Over the stretch they lost to fourteenth-ranked North Carolina and eighteenth-ranked Virginia. The Orange lost their final five games of the regular season, which included a thirty-seven point loss to third ranked Duke and another loss to North Carolina, where they were ranked sixteenth. The final game of the regular season was an overtime loss in a re-match with Pittsburgh.

The Orange finished the 2025–26 season 15–17 and 6–12 in ACC play to finish in 14th place. As the fourteenth-seed in the ACC tournament, they were defeated by SMU 69–86 in the First Round. The Orange were not invited to any post-season tournaments.

On March 11, 2026, the school fired head coach Adrian Autry. On March 24, the school named former Orange player and Siena head coach Gerry McNamara the team's new head coach.

== Previous season ==
The Orange finished the 2024–25 season 14–19 and 7–13 in ACC play to finish in 14th place. In the ACC tournament, they defeated Florida State in the first round before losing to SMU.

== Offseason ==
=== Departures ===
Departures
Name	Number	Pos.	Height	Weight	Year	Hometown	Reason for departure
Kyle Cuffe Jr.	0	G	6'2"	188	(redshirt) Junior	Harlem, New York	Transferred to Mercer
Lucas Taylor	3	G	6'5"	200	Senior	Wake Forest, North Carolina	Graduated
Chris Bell	4	F	6'7"	192	Junior	Concord, California	Transferred to California
Jaquan Carlos	5	G	6'0"	180	Senior	Brooklyn, New York	Graduated
Petar Majstorovic	6	F	6'8"	215	Freshman	Sombor, Serbia	Transferred to Long Beach State
Elijah Moore	8	G	6'4"	176	Freshman	Bronx, New York	Transferred to Utah
Naheem McLeod	10	C	7'4"	265	Senior	Philadelphia, Pennsylvania	Transferred to Florida A&M
Chance Westry	11	G	6'6"	205	(redshirt) Sophomore	Harrisburg, Pennsylvania	Transferred to UAB
Anthony Clayton	12	G	6'0"	180	Senior	Albany, New York	Graduated
Jyáre Davis	13	F	6'7"	215	Graduate Student	Newark, Delaware	Graduated
Chaz Owens	30	F	6'5"	205	Graduate Student	Blue Bell, Pennsylvania	Graduated
Chris Gatty	34	G	6'2"	175	Sophomore	Katonah, New York	—
Eddie Lampkin Jr.	44	C	6'11"	265	Graduate Student	Houston, Texas	Graduated
Nate Fleisher	51	G	6'1"	175	Senior	Highland Park, Illinois	Graduated

=== Incoming transfers ===
Incoming transfers
Name	Number	Pos.	Height	Weight	Year	Hometown	Previous school
Nate Kingz	4	G	6'5"	190	(redshirt) Senior	Salem, Oregon	Oregon State
Tyler Betsey	5	F	6'8"	225	Sophomore	Windsor, Connecticut	Cincinnati
Ibrahim Souare	10	F	6'9"	225	Freshman	Conakry, Guinea	Georgia Tech
Naithan George	11	G	6'3"	185	Junior	Toronto, Canada	Georgia Tech
William Kyle III	42	F	6'9"	230	Senior	Bellevue, Nebraska	UCLA
Bryce Zephir	55	G	6'4"	200	Graduate Student	Carson, California	Montana State

=== 2025 recruiting class ===
College recruiting
Name	Hometown	School	Height	Weight	Commit date
Kiyan Anthony; G	Brooklyn, New York	Christ the King	6 ft 5 in (1.96 m)	185 lb (84 kg)	Nov 15, 2024
Kiyan Anthony; G	Recruit ratings: Scout: Rivals: 247Sports: ESPN: (87)				
Tiefing Diawara; C	Mopti, Mali	DME Academy	7 ft 0 in (2.13 m)	240 lb (110 kg)	May 26, 2025
Tiefing Diawara; C	Recruit ratings: Scout: Rivals: 247Sports: ESPN: (NR)				
Luke Fennell; G	Melbourne, Australia	South East Melbourne	6 ft 6 in (1.98 m)	190 lb (86 kg)	Oct 23, 2024
Luke Fennell; G	Recruit ratings: Scout: Rivals: 247Sports: ESPN: (80)				
Sadiq White Jr. F	Charlotte, North Carolina	IMG Academy	6 ft 9 in (2.06 m)	195 lb (88 kg)	May 29, 2024
Sadiq White Jr. F	Recruit ratings: Scout: Rivals: 247Sports: ESPN: (88)				
Aaron Womack; F	Milwaukee, Wisconsin	Dominican High School	6 ft 6 in (1.98 m)	170 lb (77 kg)	Sep 30, 2024
Aaron Womack; F	Recruit ratings: Scout: Rivals: 247Sports: ESPN: (78)				
Overall recruit ranking: Scout: 16 Rivals: 17 ESPN: 14
Note: In many cases, Scout, Rivals, 247Sports, On3, and ESPN may conflict in their listings of height and weight.; In these cases, the average was taken. ESPN grades are on a 100-point scale.; Sources: "2025 Syracuse Signees". Rivals.; "2025 Syracuse Signees". Scout.; "2025 Syracuse Signees". ESPN.; "Scout.com Team Recruiting Rankings". Scout.; "2025 Team Ranking". Rivals.

== Roster ==
2025–26 Syracuse Orange men's basketball team
Players
Coaches

Pos.	#	Name	Height	Weight	Year	Previous school	Hometown
F	0	Sadiq White Jr.	6 ft 9 in (2.06 m)	195 lb (88 kg)	Fr	IMG Academy	Charlotte, NC
F	1	Donnie Freeman	6 ft 9 in (2.06 m)	205 lb (93 kg)	So	IMG Academy	Washington, D.C.
G	2	JJ Starling	6 ft 4 in (1.93 m)	206 lb (93 kg)	Sr	La Lumiere	Baldwinsville, NY
G	4	Nate Kingz	6 ft 5 in (1.96 m)	190 lb (86 kg)	RS Sr	McNary; Oregon State	Salem, OR
F	5	Tyler Betsey	6 ft 8 in (2.03 m)	225 lb (102 kg)	So	St. Thomas Moore; Cincinnati	Windsor, CT
G	7	Kiyan Anthony	6 ft 5 in (1.96 m)	185 lb (84 kg)	Fr	Long Island Lutheran	Brooklyn, NY
G	9	Luke Fennell	6 ft 6 in (1.98 m)	190 lb (86 kg)	Fr	South East Melbourne	Melbourne, Australia
F	10	Ibrahim Souare	6 ft 9 in (2.06 m)	225 lb (102 kg)	RS So	Canyon International Academy; Georgia Tech	Conakry, Guinea
G	11	Naithan George	6 ft 3 in (1.91 m)	185 lb (84 kg)	Jr	Canyon International Academy; Georgia Tech	Toronto, Canada
C	12	Tiefing Diawara	7 ft 0 in (2.13 m)	240 lb (109 kg)	Fr	St. John's Northwestern	Mopti, Mali
G	14	Aaron Womack	6 ft 6 in (1.98 m)	170 lb (77 kg)	Fr	Dominican	Milwaukee, WI
G	24	Noah Lobdell	6 ft 0 in (1.83 m)	150 lb (68 kg)	So	Faith Heritage	Syracuse, NY
F	42	William Kyle III	6 ft 9 in (2.06 m)	230 lb (104 kg)	Sr	Bellevue West; UCLA	Bellevue, NE
G	55	Bryce Zephir	6 ft 4 in (1.93 m)	200 lb (91 kg)	GS	Santa Monica; Montana State	Carson, CA

Head coach

- Adrian Autry, 3rd yr. (Syracuse, 1994)

Assistant coach(es)

- Dan Engelstad, 2nd yr. (St. Mary's (MD), 2007)
- Allen Griffin, 9th yr. (Syracuse, 2001)
- Brenden Straughn, 3rd yr. (Hood, 2012)
- Peter Corasaniti, 7th yr. (Syracuse, 2014)

Legend

- (C) Team captain
- (S) Suspended
- (I) Ineligible
- (W) Walk-on
- Injured
- Current redshirt

Roster
Last update: November 9, 2025

== Schedule and results ==
Date time, TV	Rank^{#}	Opponent^{#}	Result	Record	High points	High rebounds	High assists	Site (attendance) city, state
Exhibition
October 25, 2025*; 7:00 p.m., Cuse.com		vs. Buffalo	W 76–66	—	14 – Betsey	9 – Kyle III	6 – George	KeyBank Center; Buffalo, NY
October 29, 2025*; 7:00 p.m., ACCNX		Pace	W 75–57	—	22 – Freeman	9 – Freeman	4 – George	JMA Wireless Dome; Syracuse, NY
Non-conference regular season
November 3, 2025*; 7:00 p.m., ACCNX		Binghamton	W 85–47	1–0	20 – Freeman	6 – Freeman	8 – George	JMA Wireless Dome (18,762); Syracuse, NY
November 8, 2025*; 1:00 p.m., ACCNX		Delaware State	W 83–43	2–0	20 – Freeman	13 – Kyle III	4 – Freeman	JMA Wireless Dome (19,275); Syracuse, NY
November 15, 2025*; 3:30 p.m., Peacock		vs. Drexel	W 80–50	3–0	18 – Anthony	10 – Kyle III	7 – George	Xfinity Mobile Arena (5,768); Philadelphia, PA
November 18, 2025*; 9:00 p.m., ACCN		Monmouth	W 78–73	4–0	18 – Freeman	7 – Tied	9 – George	JMA Wireless Dome (18,515); Syracuse, NY
November 24, 2025*; 6:00 p.m., TNT		vs. No. 3 Houston; Players Era Festival Game 1	L 74–78 ^{OT}	4–1	16 – Betsey	10 – Kyle III	4 – Starling	MGM Grand Garden Arena (4,628); Paradise, NV
November 25, 2025*; 3:30 p.m., TNT		vs. Kansas; Players Era Festival Game 2	L 60–71	4–2	12 – Betsey	9 – Kyle III	4 – George	MGM Grand Garden Arena; Paradise, NV
November 26, 2025*; 1:00 p.m., TNT		vs. No. 15 Iowa State; Players Era Festival Consolation Game	L 64–95	4–3	14 – White Jr.	6 – Betsey	6 – George	MGM Grand Garden Arena; Paradise, NV
December 2, 2025*; 7:00 p.m., ESPN2		No. 13 Tennessee; ACC–SEC Challenge	W 62–60	5–3	19 – Kingz	9 – White Jr.	3 – George	JMA Wireless Dome (19,657); Syracuse, NY
December 11, 2025*; 9:00 p.m., ACCN		Saint Joseph's	W 71–63	6–3	16 – Betsey	11 – Kyle III	3 – George	JMA Wireless Dome (12,584); Syracuse, NY
December 13, 2025*; 4:00 p.m., ACCN		Hofstra	L 69–70	6–4	15 – Starling	7 – White Jr.	6 – George	JMA Wireless Dome (13,282); Syracuse, NY
December 17, 2025*; 7:00 p.m., ACCNX		Mercyhurst	W 76–62	7–4	15 – Tied	10 – Kyle III	4 – Tied	JMA Wireless Dome (12,258); Syracuse, NY
December 20, 2025*; 4:00 p.m., ACCNX		Northeastern	W 91–83	8–4	22 – George	8 – Kyle III	6 – George	JMA Wireless Dome (13,273); Syracuse, NY
December 22, 2025*; 7:00 p.m., ACCNX		Stonehill	W 77–48	9–4	22 – George	10 – Kyle III	4 – Starling	JMA Wireless Dome (12,742); Syracuse, NY
ACC Regular Season
December 31, 2025; 2:00 p.m., ESPN2		Clemson	L 61–64	9–5 (0–1)	18 – Freeman	9 – Freeman	6 – George	JMA Wireless Dome (16,245); Syracuse, NY
January 6, 2026; 7:00 p.m., ACCN		at Georgia Tech	W 82–72	10–5 (1–1)	27 – Freeman	9 – Freeman	5 – George	McCamish Pavilion (6,216); Atlanta, GA
January 10, 2026; 2:00 p.m., ACCN		at Pittsburgh	W 83–72	11–5 (2–1)	22 – Freeman	5 – Freeman	7 – George	Petersen Events Center (6,358); Pittsburgh, PA
January 13, 2026; 9:00 p.m., ACCN		Florida State	W 94–86	12–5 (3–1)	25 – Freeman	9 – Kyle III	13 – George	JMA Wireless Dome (18,684); Syracuse, NY
January 17, 2026; 2:00 p.m., ACCN		at Boston College	L 73–81 ^{OT}	12–6 (3–2)	27 – Kingz	14 – Freeman	3 – Kingz	Conte Forum (8,606); Chestnut Hill, MA
January 21, 2026; 9:00 p.m., ACCN		Virginia Tech	L 74–76	12–7 (3–3)	12 – Starling	9 – Freeman	3 – Tied	JMA Wireless Dome (18,738); Syracuse, NY
January 24, 2026; 2:00 p.m., ACCN		Miami	L 76–85	12–8 (3–4)	14 – Freeman	4 – Tied	5 – George	JMA Wireless Dome (21,417); Syracuse, NY
January 27, 2026; 7:00 p.m., ESPNU		at NC State	L 66–86	12–9 (3–5)	23 – Williams	9 – Lubin	9 – Copeland	Lenovo Center (15,636); Raleigh, NC
January 31, 2026; 6:00 p.m., The CW		Notre Dame	W 86–72	13–9 (4–5)	28 – Kingz	8 – Kyle III	10 – George	JMA Wireless Dome (21,455); Syracuse, NY
February 2, 2026; 7:00 p.m., ESPN		at No. 14 North Carolina	L 77–87	13–10 (4–6)	23 – Freeman	8 – Freeman	4 – George	Dean E. Smith Center (20,152); Chapel Hill, NC
February 7, 2026; 12:00 p.m., ESPN		at No. 18 Virginia	L 59–72	13–11 (4–7)	19 – George	9 – Freeman	4 – Freeman	John Paul Jones Arena (14,637); Charlottesville, VA
February 11, 2026; 7:00 p.m., ESPNU		California	W 107–100 ^{2OT}	14–11 (5–7)	27 – Kingz	16 – Kyle III	10 – George	JMA Wireless Dome (19,053); Syracuse, NY
February 14, 2026; 2:00 p.m., The CW		SMU	W 79–78	15–11 (6–7)	18 – Freeman	7 – Kyle III	6 – George	JMA Wireless Dome (19,680); Syracuse, NY
February 16, 2026; 7:00 p.m., ESPN		at No. 3 Duke	L 64–101	15–12 (6–8)	12 – Kyle III	7 – Souare	4 – Starling	Cameron Indoor Stadium (9,314); Durham, NC
February 21, 2026; 1:00 p.m., ABC		No. 16 North Carolina	L 64–77	15–13 (6–9)	22 – Starling	8 – Kyle III	2 – Starling	JMA Wireless Dome (23,606); Syracuse, NY
February 28, 2026; 5:45 p.m., The CW		at Wake Forest	L 83–88	15–14 (6–10)	28 – Freeman	5 – Freeman	10 – George	LJVM Coliseum (9,208); Winston-Salem, NC
March 3, 2026; 9:00 p.m., ACCN		at Louisville	L 62–77	15–15 (6–11)	16 – George	11 – Freeman	2 – Tied	KFC Yum! Center (15,306); Louisville, KY
March 7, 2026; 4:30 p.m., The CW		Pittsburgh	L 69–71 ^{OT}	15–16 (6–12)	26 – George	13 – Freeman	4 – George	JMA Wireless Dome (19,837); Syracuse, NY
ACC tournament
March 10, 2026; 4:30 p.m., ACCN	(14)	vs. (11) SMU; First Round	L 69–86	15–17	25 – Kingz	7 – Betsey	11 – George	Spectrum Center (6,593); Charlotte, NC
*Non-conference game. ^{#}Rankings from AP poll. (#) Tournament seedings in parentheses. All times are in Eastern Time.
