= 2025–26 Florida State Seminoles men's basketball team =

American college basketball season

2025–26 Florida State Seminoles men's basketball
- Conference: Atlantic Coast Conference
- Record: 18–15 (10–8 ACC)
- Head coach: Luke Loucks (1st season)
- Associate head coach: Jim Moran (1st season)
- Assistant coaches: Michael Fly (1st season); Gerald Gillion (1st season); Chris Kent (1st season); Derwin Kitchen (1st season)
- Home arena: Donald L. Tucker Center

2025–26 ACC men's basketball standings
	Conf.				Overall
Team	W		L	PCT	W		L	PCT
No. 4 Duke †	17	–	1	.944	35	–	3	.921
No. 17 Virginia	15	–	3	.833	30	–	6	.833
No. 24 Miami (FL)	13	–	5	.722	26	–	9	.743
North Carolina	12	–	6	.667	24	–	9	.727
Clemson	12	–	6	.667	24	–	11	.686
No. 23 Louisville	11	–	7	.611	24	–	11	.686
NC State	10	–	8	.556	20	–	14	.588
Florida State	10	–	8	.556	18	–	15	.545
California	9	–	9	.500	22	–	12	.647
Stanford	9	–	9	.500	20	–	13	.606
SMU	8	–	10	.444	20	–	14	.588
Virginia Tech	8	–	10	.444	19	–	13	.594
Wake Forest	7	–	11	.389	18	–	17	.514
Syracuse	6	–	12	.333	15	–	17	.469
Pittsburgh	5	–	13	.278	13	–	20	.394
Notre Dame	4	–	14	.222	13	–	18	.419
Boston College	4	–	14	.222	11	–	20	.355
Georgia Tech	2	–	16	.111	11	–	20	.355
† 2026 ACC tournament winner Rankings from AP Poll

The 2025–26 Florida State Seminoles men's basketball team represented Florida State University during the 2025–26 NCAA Division I men's basketball season. The Seminoles were led by head coach Luke Loucks, in his first season. Loucks replaced Leonard Hamilton, who had been the head coach for twenty-three seasons. The Seminoles played their home games at the Donald L. Tucker Center on the university's Tallahassee, Florida campus as members of the Atlantic Coast Conference.

The Seminoles started the season with two wins before traveling to face rivals and tenth-ranked Florida. In a competitive game, the Seminoles lost by only two-points. They won three straight games against non-Power 4 opponents before traveling to Tampa, Florida to play Texas A&M in the Battle in the Bay. Florida State dropped the game 95–59. They were also defeated by Georgia in their ACC–SEC Challenge game. Their losing streak was extended by eighth-ranked Houston and UMass in the Orange Bowl Basketball Classic. A defeat by twenty-eight points at Dayton brought their losing streak to five games. They broke the streak with a 96–49 win against Mississippi Valley State. The Seminoles won their final non-conference game against Jacksonville. The team lost their first five ACC matches, including losses to twelfth-ranked North Carolina and sixth-ranked Duke. Their streak was broken with a rivalry win against Miami. The Seminoles went 3–2 over their next five games, with losses at SMU and against fifteenth-ranked Virginia. The Seminoles' season improved from there as they went 6–1 over their final five games. Their only loss was in a rivalry rematch against Miami. The only two wins that came by less than double-digits over the stretch were a five point victory at Clemson and a one point win at Pittsburgh.

The Seminoles finished the season 18–15 overall and 10–8 in ACC play to finish in a tie for seventh place. As the eighth seed in the 2026 ACC tournament, they earned a bye to the Second Round where they defeated ninth-seed California 95–89. Their run ended there as they lost to top seed and first-ranked Duke in the Quarterfinals. Florida State announced that they declined a bid to participate in the NIT. Lajae Jones went on to be selected in the second round of the NBA Draft.

== Previous season ==
The Seminoles finished the season 17–14 and 8–12 in ACC play to finish in a five-way tie for ninth place. As the eleventh seed in the 2025 ACC tournament, they faced fourteenth seed Syracuse in the First Round. Florida State couldn't repeat their regular season win and were defeated 66–62. They were not invited to the NCAA tournament or the NIT.

== Offseason ==
=== Departures ===
Florida State Departures
Name	Number	Pos.	Height	Weight	Year	Hometown	Reason for Departure
Chandler Jackson	0	G	6'5"	205	Junior	Memphis, Tennessee	Transferred to Arkansas State
Jamir Watkins	1	G	6'7"	210	(redshirt) Senior	Trenton, New Jersey	Graduated; drafted 43rd overall in the 2025 NBA draft
Bostyn Holt	3	G	6'7"	200	Senior	Portland, Oregon	Graduated
Jason Simpson	4	G	5'10"	170	Senior	West Palm Beach, Florida	Graduated
Daquan Davis	5	G	6'1"	176	Freshman	Baltimore, Maryland	Transferred to Providence
Jerry Deng	7	F	6'9"	220	Sophomore	Rochester, New York	Transferred to NC State
Anastasios Rozakeas	9	G/F	6'7"	225	Freshman	Athens, Greece	Transferred to Mount St. Mary's
Taylor Bol Bowen	10	F	6'10"	205	Sophomore	Jericho, Vermont	Transferred to Alabama
Christian Nitu	11	F	6'11"	220	Freshman	Whitby, Ontario	Transferred to Washington
Malique Ewin	12	F	6'11"	230	Junior	Lawrenceville, Georgia	Transferred to Arkansas
Justin Thomas	25	G	6'7"	184	Senior	Baton Rouge, Louisiana	Transferred to Bowling Green
Waka Mbatch	35	F	6'10"	225	Sophomore	Serekunda, Gambia	Transferred to Montana State
Isaac Spainhour	40	G	6'3"	180	(redshirt) Junior	King, North Carolina	Graduated
Jesse Jones	43	G	6'4"	195	Senior	Clermont, Florida	Graduated

=== Incoming transfers ===
Florida State incoming transfers
Name	Number	Pos.	Height	Weight	Year	Hometown	Previous School
Martin Somerville	1	G	6'3"	185	Sophomore	Bowie, Maryland	UMass Lowell
Shah Muhammad	4	F	6'11"	200	Junior	Queens, New York	UMass
Kobe MaGee	5	G	6'5"	207	Senior	Allentown, Pennsylvania	Drexel
Robert McCray V	6	G	6'4"	188	Senior	Columbia, South Carolina	Jacksonville
Chauncey Wiggins	7	F	6'10"	225	Senior	Atlanta, Georgia	Clemson
Lajae Jones	10	G	6'7"	220	Senior	Neptune Beach, Florida	St. Bonaventure
Alex Steen	25	F	6'9"	230	Senior	Panama City Beach, Florida	Florida Southern

=== 2025 Recruiting class ===
College recruiting information
Name	Hometown	School	Height	Weight	Commit date
Thomas Bassong; F	Paris, France	Overtime Elite	6 ft 8 in (2.03 m)	203 lb (92 kg)	Apr 5, 2025
Thomas Bassong; F	Recruit ratings: Scout: Rivals: 247Sports: ESPN: (NR)				
Maximo Garcia-Plata; G	Madrid, Spain	Ortega and Gassett	6 ft 4 in (1.93 m)	180 lb (82 kg)	Aug 4, 2025
Maximo Garcia-Plata; G	Recruit ratings: Scout: Rivals: 247Sports: ESPN: (NR)				
Cam Miles; G	Chicago, Illinois	IMG Academy	6 ft 2 in (1.88 m)	170 lb (77 kg)	Apr 16, 2025
Cam Miles; G	Recruit ratings: Scout: Rivals: 247Sports: ESPN: (81)				
Xavier Osceola; G	Hollywood, Florida	University School	6 ft 1 in (1.85 m)	175 lb (79 kg)	Jul 16, 2025
Xavier Osceola; G	Recruit ratings: Scout: Rivals: 247Sports: ESPN: (NR)				
Overall recruit ranking: Rivals: 98 247Sports: 83 ESPN: NR
Note: In many cases, Scout, Rivals, 247Sports, On3, and ESPN may conflict in their listings of height and weight.; In these cases, the average was taken. ESPN grades are on a 100-point scale.; Sources: "Florida State Seminoles". ESPN.; "2025 Team Ranking". Rivals.

== Roster ==
2025–26 Florida State Seminoles men's basketball team
Players
Coaches

Pos.	#	Name	Height	Weight	Year	Previous school	Hometown
G	0	Maximo Garcia-Plata	6 ft 4 in (1.93 m)	180 lb (82 kg)	Fr	Ortega and Gassett	Madrid, Spain
G	1	Martin Somerville	6 ft 3 in (1.91 m)	185 lb (84 kg)	So	Southern California Academy; UMass Lowell	Bowie, MD
G	2	Cam Miles	6 ft 2 in (1.88 m)	170 lb (77 kg)	Fr	IMG Academy	Chicago, IL
F	3	Thomas Bassong	6 ft 8 in (2.03 m)	203 lb (92 kg)	Fr	Overtime Elite	Paris, France
F	4	Shahid Muhammad	6 ft 11 in (2.11 m)	200 lb (91 kg)	Jr	Academy of the New Church; UMass	Queens, NY
G	5	Kobe MaGee	6 ft 5 in (1.96 m)	207 lb (94 kg)	Sr	Executive Education Academy; Drexel	Allentown, PA
G	6	Robert McCray V	6 ft 4 in (1.93 m)	188 lb (85 kg)	Sr	AC Flora; Jacksonville	Columbia, SC
F	7	Chauncey Wiggins	6 ft 10 in (2.08 m)	225 lb (102 kg)	Sr	Grayson; Clemson	Atlanta, GA
G	10	Lajae Jones	6 ft 7 in (2.01 m)	220 lb (100 kg)	Sr	Fletcher; St. Bonaventure	Neptune Beach, FL
G	11	Xavier Osceola	6 ft 1 in (1.85 m)	175 lb (79 kg)	Fr	University School	Hollywood, FL
F	12	Alier Maluk	6 ft 11 in (2.11 m)	220 lb (100 kg)	So	Long Island Lutheran	Baldwin, PA
G	15	Jalen Crawford	6 ft 0 in (1.83 m)	165 lb (75 kg)	So	Maclay School	Tallahassee, FL
F	19	AJ Swinton	6 ft 6 in (1.98 m)	200 lb (91 kg)	So	Bishop O'Connell	Cabin John, MD
F	25	Alex Steen	6 ft 9 in (2.06 m)	230 lb (104 kg)	Sr	Arnold; Florida Southern	Panama City Beach, FL

Head coach

- Luke Loucks (Florida State)

Assistant coach(es)

- Jim Moran (William & Mary)
- Michael Fly (Kentucky)
- Gerald Gillion (Florida State)
- Chris Kent (Trine)
- Derwin Kitchen (Florida State)

Legend

- (C) Team captain
- (S) Suspended
- (I) Ineligible
- (W) Walk-on
- Injured
- Current redshirt

Roster

== Schedule and results ==
Date time, TV	Rank^{#}	Opponent^{#}	Result	Record	High points	High rebounds	High assists	Site (attendance) city, state Source:
Exhibition
October 16, 2025*; 8:00 p.m., YouTube		vs. No. 15 Alabama	L 105–109	–	26 – McCray V	11 – Wiggins	3 – Tied	Boutwell Auditorium (2,463); Birmingham, AL
October 26, 2025*; 4:00 p.m., ACCNX		Florida A&M	W 88–54	–	15 – Tied	6 – Tied	2 – Tied	Donald L. Tucker Center (5,527); Tallahassee, FL
Non-conference regular season
November 4, 2025*; 7:00 p.m., ACCNX		Alcorn State	W 108–76	1–0	22 – Wiggins	7 – Jones	17 – McCray V	Donald L. Tucker Center (5,397); Tallahassee, FL
November 7, 2025*; 7:00 p.m., ACCNX		Alabama State	W 101–64	2–0	20 – Jones	8 – Steen	5 – McCray V	Donald L. Tucker Center (6,137); Tallahassee, FL
November 11, 2025*; 7:00 p.m., SECN		at No. 10 Florida; Rivalry	L 76–78	2–1	29 – McCray V	9 – MaGee	4 – McCray V	O'Connell Center (10,785); Gainesville, FL
November 18, 2025*; 7:00 p.m., ACCNX		UT Martin	W 87–73	3–1	17 – Miles	7 – Steen	7 – McCray V	Donald L. Tucker Center (4,367); Tallahassee, FL
November 21, 2025*; 6:00 p.m., ACCNX		Georgia Southern	W 98–72	4–1	36 – Jones	10 – Wiggins	7 – McCray V	Donald L. Tucker Center (3,977); Tallahassee, FL
November 25, 2025*; 7:00 p.m., ACCNX		Cal State Bakersfield	W 89–59	5–1	17 – Wiggins	10 – Steen	7 – Miles	Donald L. Tucker Center (3,567); Tallahassee, FL
November 28, 2025*; 5:00 p.m., ESPN2		vs. Texas A&M; Battle in the Bay	L 59–95	5–2	21 – MaGee	7 – Steen	11 – McCray V	Benchmark International Arena (4,598); Tampa, FL
December 2, 2025*; 9:00 p.m., ACCN		Georgia; ACC–SEC Challenge	L 73–107	5–3	18 – McCray V	5 – Tied	3 – Jones	Donald L. Tucker Center (6,677); Tallahassee, FL
December 6, 2025*; 8:00 p.m., Peacock		vs. No. 8 Houston; Houston Hoops Showdown	L 67–82	5–4	16 – McCray V	6 – Tied	5 – McCray V	Toyota Center (7,121); Houston, TX
December 13, 2025*; 12:00 p.m., ACCN		vs. UMass; Orange Bowl Basketball Classic	L 95–103	5–5	21 – McCray V	10 – MaGee	11 – McCray V	Amerant Bank Arena; Sunrise, FL
December 16, 2025*; 7:00 p.m., CBSSN		at Dayton	L 69–97	5–6	15 – Magee	8 – Jones	3 – McCray V	UD Arena (13,407); Dayton, OH
December 19, 2025*; 7:00 p.m., ACCNX		Mississippi Valley State	W 96–49	6–6	16 – Wiggins	9 – Steen	7 – McCray V	Donald L. Tucker Center (3,692); Tallahassee, FL
December 22, 2025*; 7:00 p.m., ACCNX		Jacksonville	W 87–63	7–6	23 – Somerville	9 – Steen	10 – McCray V	Donald L. Tucker Center (4,077); Tallahassee, FL
ACC regular season
December 30, 2025; 7:00 p.m., ESPN2		at No. 12 North Carolina	L 66–79	7–7 (0–1)	16 – Wiggins	10 – Wiggins	8 – McCray V	Dean Smith Center (20,618); Chapel Hill, NC
January 3, 2026; 3:45 p.m., CBS		No. 6 Duke	L 87–91	7–8 (0–2)	22 – Tied	4 – Jones	5 – McCray	Donald L. Tucker Center (6,097); Tallahassee, FL
January 10, 2026; 12:00 p.m., ACCN		NC State	L 69–113	7–9 (0–3)	14 – Bassong	5 – Somerville	1 – Tied	Donald L. Tucker Center (6,917); Tallahassee, FL
January 13, 2026; 9:00 p.m., ACCN		at Syracuse	L 86–94	7–10 (0–4)	20 – MaGee	7 – Jones	6 – McCray V	JMA Wireless Dome (18,684); Syracuse, NY
January 17, 2026; 6:00 p.m., ESPN2		Wake Forest	L 68–69	7–11 (0–5)	15 – Wiggins	10 – Jones	5 – McCray V	Donald L. Tucker Center (6,047); Tallahassee, FL
January 20, 2026; 7:00 p.m., ESPNU		at Miami (FL); Rivalry	W 65–63	8–11 (1–5)	20 – McCray V	9 – Jones	4 – Tied	Watsco Center (5,664); Coral Gables, FL
January 24, 2026; 4:00 p.m., ACCN		at SMU	L 80–83	8–12 (1–6)	21 – McCray V	12 – Jones	9 – McCray V	Moody Coliseum (5,974); Dallas, TX
January 28, 2026; 7:00 p.m., ACCN		California	W 63–61	9–12 (2–6)	18 – Wiggins	8 – Jones	4 – Tied	Donald L. Tucker Center (4,867); Tallahassee, FL
January 31, 2026; 6:00 p.m., ACCN		Stanford	W 88–80	10–12 (3–6)	23 – Wiggins	6 – MaGee	7 – McCray V	Donald L. Tucker Center (6,307); Tallahassee, FL
February 7, 2026; 4:00 p.m., The CW		at Notre Dame	W 82–79	11–12 (4–6)	22 – Wiggins	9 – Steen	6 – Somerville	Joyce Center (6,170); South Bend, IN
February 10, 2026; 7:00 p.m., ESPNU		No. 15 Virginia	L 58–61	11–13 (4–7)	21 – Jones	13 – Jones	5 – McCray V	Donald L. Tucker Center (7,377); Tallahassee, FL
February 14, 2026; 2:00 p.m., ACCN		at Virginia Tech	W 92–69	12–13 (5–7)	23 – Somerville	7 – Jones	6 – Somerville	Cassell Coliseum (8,925); Blacksburg, VA
February 17, 2026; 6:00 p.m., ACCN		Boston College	W 80–72	13–13 (6–7)	27 – McCray V	9 – Jones	5 – McCray V	Donald L. Tucker Center (4,577); Tallahassee, FL
February 21, 2026; 12:00 p.m., The CW		at Clemson	W 70–65	14–13 (7–7)	29 – McCray V	6 – McCray V	3 – Tied	Littlejohn Coliseum (8,241); Clemson, SC
February 24, 2026; 9:00 p.m., ACCN		Miami (FL)	L 73–83	14–14 (7–8)	21 – Jones	5 – Wiggins	6 – McCray V	Donald L. Tucker Center (10,317); Tallahassee, FL
February 28, 2026; 12:00 p.m., ACCN		at Georgia Tech	W 80–71	15–14 (8–8)	20 – McCray V	12 – Bassong	5 – McCray V	McCamish Pavilion (6,773); Atlanta, GA
March 4, 2026; 9:00 p.m., ACCN		at Pittsburgh	W 75–74	16–14 (9–8)	18 – Tied	8 – Bassong	6 – McCray V	Petersen Events Center (5,109); Pittsburgh, PA
March 7, 2026; 2:00 p.m., ACCN		SMU	W 91–78	17–14 (10–8)	31 – Wiggins	9 – Wiggins	12 – McCray V	Donald L. Tucker Center (6,757); Tallahassee, FL
ACC Tournament
March 11, 2026; 7:00 p.m., ESPN2	(8)	vs. (9) California; Second Round	W 95–89	18–14	30 – McCray V	8 – Steen	8 – McCray V	Spectrum Center (9,620); Charlotte, NC
March 12, 2026; 7:00 p.m., ESPN	(8)	vs. (1) No. 1 Duke; Quarterfinals	L 79–80	18–15	28 – Jones	8 – Steen	4 – McCray	Spectrum Center (17,627); Charlotte, NC
*Non-conference game. ^{#}Rankings from AP poll. (#) Tournament seedings in parentheses. All times are in Eastern Time.

== Honors ==
Honors
Player	Award	Ref.
Robert McCray V	ACC Player of the Week; All-ACC Third Team; All-ACC Tournament First Team	
Lajae Jones	All-ACC Tournament Second Team	

== NBA draft ==
Round	Pick (Overall)	Name	Team
2nd	54	Lajae Jones	Golden State Warriors
