= 2025–26 SMU Mustangs men's basketball team =

American college basketball season

2025–26 SMU Mustangs men's basketball
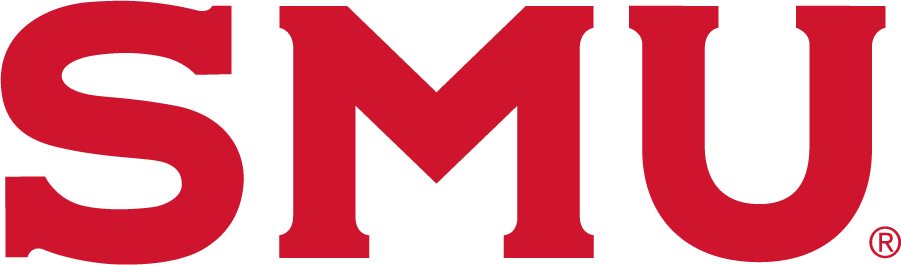

NCAA tournament, First Four
- Conference: Atlantic Coast Conference
- Record: 20–14 (8–10 ACC)
- Head coach: Andy Enfield (2nd season)
- Associate head coach: Chris Capko
- Assistant coaches: Jay Morris; Dana Ford; Eric Mobley; Kurt Karis
- Home arena: Moody Coliseum

2025–26 ACC men's basketball standings
| | Conf. | | | | Overall |
| Team | W | | L | PCT | W | | L | PCT |
|---|---|---|---|---|---|---|---|---|
| No. 4 Duke † | 17 | – | 1 | .944 | 35 | – | 3 | .921 |
| No. 17 Virginia | 15 | – | 3 | .833 | 30 | – | 6 | .833 |
| No. 24 Miami (FL) | 13 | – | 5 | .722 | 26 | – | 9 | .743 |
| North Carolina | 12 | – | 6 | .667 | 24 | – | 9 | .727 |
| Clemson | 12 | – | 6 | .667 | 24 | – | 11 | .686 |
| No. 23 Louisville | 11 | – | 7 | .611 | 24 | – | 11 | .686 |
| NC State | 10 | – | 8 | .556 | 20 | – | 14 | .588 |
| Florida State | 10 | – | 8 | .556 | 18 | – | 15 | .545 |
| California | 9 | – | 9 | .500 | 22 | – | 12 | .647 |
| Stanford | 9 | – | 9 | .500 | 20 | – | 13 | .606 |
| SMU | 8 | – | 10 | .444 | 20 | – | 14 | .588 |
| Virginia Tech | 8 | – | 10 | .444 | 19 | – | 13 | .594 |
| Wake Forest | 7 | – | 11 | .389 | 18 | – | 17 | .514 |
| Syracuse | 6 | – | 12 | .333 | 15 | – | 17 | .469 |
| Pittsburgh | 5 | – | 13 | .278 | 13 | – | 20 | .394 |
| Notre Dame | 4 | – | 14 | .222 | 13 | – | 18 | .419 |
| Boston College | 4 | – | 14 | .222 | 11 | – | 20 | .355 |
| Georgia Tech | 2 | – | 16 | .111 | 11 | – | 20 | .355 |
† 2026 ACC tournament winner Rankings from AP Poll

The 2025–26 SMU Mustangs men's basketball team represented Southern Methodist University during the 2025–26 NCAA Division I men's basketball season. The Mustangs, led by second-year head coach Andy Enfield, played their home games at Moody Coliseum on their campus in University Park, Texas (Note: University Park and its neighbor of Highland Park form an enclave within Dallas known as the Park Cities. All locations within the Park Cities have a Dallas mailing address.) as second-year members of the Atlantic Coast Conference (ACC).

The Mustangs began their season with an eight-game winning streak. However, only the final game of the streak, an overtime loss to Mississippi State by six-points, was against a Power-4 team. Their streak was broken with a loss to seventeenth-ranked Vanderbilt in the ACC–SEC Challenge. The Mustangs rebounded with a thirteen-point victory, in overtime, against Texas A&M. They played a fourth SEC team in a row, losing to LSU in the Compete 4 Cause Classic. They finished their non-conference slate with wins against Central Arkansas and Cal State Fullerton. They began the ACC season with an upset of then twelfth-ranked North Carolina 97–83. The win saw the Mustangs enter the AP poll at twenty-fourth. A four-point loss to Clemson and a seven-point loss to sixth-ranked Duke saw the Mustangs fall back out of the poll. The team went 3–2 over their next five games, losing to sixteenth-ranked Virginia and twentieth-ranked Louisville over the stretch. The team went 4–2 over their next six games, with both of their losses over the stretch coming by just one point. They defeated the only ranked team they faced, twenty-first ranked Louisville. They could not carry the momentum through to the end of the season, as they lost four straight games to finish regular season play. They lost by eight-points to the only ranked team they faced in the run, twenty-second ranked Miami.

The Mustangs finished the season 20–14 and 8–10 in ACC play to finish in a tie for eleventh place. As the eleventh seed in the 2026 ACC tournament, they defeated Syracuse in the First Round and faced Louisville for the third time this season in the Second Round. After splitting the regular season series, they were defeated by the sixth-seed and twenty-fourth ranked Cardinals 58–62. Received an at-large bid to the NCAA tournament. They were an eleven-seed in the Midwest regional and were placed in the First Four. They lost to fellow eleven-seed Miami (OH) by ten points to end their season.

== Previous season ==
The Mustangs finished the season 24–11 and 13–7 in ACC play to finish in a three-way tie for fourth place. As the sixth seed in the 2025 ACC tournament, they earned a bye into the Second Round, where they defeated fourteenth seed Syracuse for the second time in eight days. They advanced to the Quarterfinals, where they lost to third seed and tenth ranked Clemson, 57–54. They were exempt qualifiers in the NIT. The Mustangs were the one-seed in their Dallas Region. They defeated Northern Iowa in the First Round before losing to fourth seed Oklahoma State 85–83 in the Second Round.

== Offseason ==
=== Departures ===
Departures
| Name | Number | Pos. | Height | Weight | Year | Hometown | Reason for departure |
|---|---|---|---|---|---|---|---|
| Chuck Harris | 3 | G | 6'2" | 200 | Senior | Ashburn, Virginia | Graduated, signed with VfL Kirchheim Knights |
| Tibet Görener | 5 | F | 6'9" | 205 | (redshirt) Senior | Istanbul, Turkey | Graduated |
| Kario Oquendo | 8 | G | 6'4" | 210 | Graduate Student | Titusville, Florida | Graduated |
| AJ George | 10 | G | 6'6" | 190 | Junior | Fresno, California | Transferred to Cal State Bakersfield |
| Jerrell Colbert | 20 | C | 6'10" | 235 | (redshirt) Junior | Houston, Texas | Transferred to McNeese |
| Yohan Traoré | 21 | F | 6'11" | 235 | Junior | Tours, France | Transferred to Butler |
| Keon Ambrose-Hylton | 22 | F | 6'8" | 215 | Senior | Toronto, Canada | Graduated |
| Matt Cross | 33 | F | 6'7" | 230 | Senior | Beverly, Massachusetts | Graduated |
| Jackson Young | 35 | G | 6'2" | 185 | Senior | Kerrville, Texas | Graduated |

=== Incoming transfers ===
Incoming transfers
| Name | Number | Pos. | Height | Weight | Year | Hometown | Previous school |
|---|---|---|---|---|---|---|---|
| Corey Washington | 3 | F | 6'6" | 190 | Senior | Little Rock, Arkansas | Wichita State |
| Sam Walters | 4 | F | 6'9" | 230 | Junior | The Villages, Florida | Michigan |
| Jaron Pierre Jr. | 5 | G | 6'5" | 210 | Senior | New Orleans, Louisiana | Jacksonville State |

=== 2025 Recruiting class ===
College recruiting
| Name | Hometown | School | Height | Weight | Commit date |
|---|---|---|---|---|---|
| B.J. Davis-Ray; G | St. Louis, Missouri | JSerra Catholic | 6 ft 6 in (1.98 m) | 195 lb (88 kg) | Nov 14, 2024 |
| B.J. Davis-Ray; G | Recruit ratings: Scout: Rivals: 247Sports: ESPN: (82) | | | | |
| Jermaine O’Neal Jr. F | Southlake, Texas | Dynamic Prep | 6 ft 5 in (1.96 m) | 185 lb (84 kg) | Sep 18, 2024 |
| Jermaine O’Neal Jr. F | Recruit ratings: Scout: Rivals: 247Sports: ESPN: (83) | | | | |
| Jaden Toombs; C | Amarillo, Texas | Dynamic Prep | 6 ft 10 in (2.08 m) | 230 lb (100 kg) | Sep 25, 2024 |
| Jaden Toombs; C | Recruit ratings: Scout: Rivals: 247Sports: ESPN: (87) | | | | |
| Nigel Walls; F | Houston, Texas | St. Francis Episcopal School | 6 ft 10 in (2.08 m) | 200 lb (91 kg) | Nov 8, 2024 |
| Nigel Walls; F | Recruit ratings: Scout: Rivals: 247Sports: ESPN: (83) | | | | |
| Billy White III; F | Corpus Christi, Texas | Veterans Memorial | 6 ft 8 in (2.03 m) | 195 lb (88 kg) | Aug 7, 2025 |
| Billy White III; F | Recruit ratings: Scout: Rivals: 247Sports: ESPN: (83) | | | | |
Overall recruit ranking: Rivals: 9 247Sports: 6 ESPN: 10
Note: In many cases, Scout, Rivals, 247Sports, On3, and ESPN may conflict in their listings of height and weight.; In these cases, the average was taken. ESPN grades are on a 100-point scale.; Sources: "SMU 2025 Basketball Commitments". Rivals.; "2025 SMU Mustangs Recruiting Class". ESPN.; "2025 Team Ranking". Rivals.; "2025 SMU Mustangs Basketball 24/7 Sports Commits". 247Sports.

== Roster ==
2025–26 SMU Mustangs men's basketball team
Players
Coaches

| Pos. | # | Name | Height | Weight | Year | Previous school | Hometown |
|---|---|---|---|---|---|---|---|
| G | 0 | B.J. Edwards | 6 ft 3 in (1.91 m) | 200 lb (91 kg) | Sr | Knoxville Catholic | Knoxville, TN |
| F | 1 | Chance Puryear | 6 ft 7 in (2.01 m) | 210 lb (95 kg) | RS Fr | Carter | Dallas, TX |
| G | 2 | Boopie Miller | 6 ft 0 in (1.83 m) | 175 lb (79 kg) | Sr | Victory Rock Prep; Wake Forest | Chicago, IL |
| F | 3 | Corey Washington | 6 ft 6 in (1.98 m) | 190 lb (86 kg) | Sr | Sylvan Hills; Wichita State | Little Rock, AR |
| F | 4 | Sam Walters | 6 ft 9 in (2.06 m) | 230 lb (104 kg) | Jr | The Villages Charter; Michigan | The Villages, FL |
| G | 5 | Jaron Pierre Jr. | 6 ft 5 in (1.96 m) | 210 lb (95 kg) | Sr | St. Augustine; Jacksonville State | New Orleans, LA |
| F | 7 | Jermaine O’Neal Jr. | 6 ft 5 in (1.96 m) | 185 lb (84 kg) | Fr | Dynamic Prep | Southlake, TX |
| F | 8 | Billy White III | 6 ft 8 in (2.03 m) | 195 lb (88 kg) | Fr | Veterans Memorial | Corpus Christi, TX |
| G | 9 | B.J. Davis-Ray | 6 ft 6 in (1.98 m) | 195 lb (88 kg) | Fr | JSerra Catholic | St. Louis, MO |
| C | 10 | Jaden Toombs | 6 ft 10 in (2.08 m) | 230 lb (104 kg) | Fr | Dynamic Prep | Amarillo, TX |
| F | 13 | Mitchell Holmes | 6 ft 10 in (2.08 m) | 230 lb (104 kg) | RS Fr | The Oakridge School | Fort Worth, TX |
| F | 22 | Nigel Walls | 6 ft 10 in (2.08 m) | 200 lb (91 kg) | Fr | St. Francis Episcopal | Houston, TX |
| C | 24 | Samet Yiğitoğlu | 7 ft 2 in (2.18 m) | 270 lb (122 kg) | So | Sigortam Istanbul | Istanbul, Türkiye |
| G | 31 | Trey Utter | 6 ft 0 in (1.83 m) | 175 lb (79 kg) | Sr | Argyle | Argyle, TX |
| G | 33 | Niccolo Kalischer-Stork | 6 ft 2 in (1.88 m) | 205 lb (93 kg) | RS Fr | Harvard-Westlake | Los Angeles, CA |

Head coach

- Andy Enfield (John's Hopkins)

Assistant coach(es)

- Chris Kapko (South Florida)
- Jay Morris (Concordia)
- Dana Ford (Illinois State)
- Eric Mobley (Portland)
- Kurt Karis (USC)

Legend

- (C) Team captain
- (S) Suspended
- (I) Ineligible
- (W) Walk-on
- Injured
- Current redshirt

Roster
Last update: November 4, 2025

== Schedule and results ==
| Date time, TV | Rank^{#} | Opponent^{#} | Result | Record | High points | High rebounds | High assists | Site (attendance) city, state |
Exhibition
| October 25, 2025*; 2:00 p.m. | | Oklahoma State | W 86–71 | — | 22 – Pierre Jr. | 6 – Tied | 8 – Miller | Moody Coliseum (4,514); Dallas, TX |
Non-conference regular season
| November 3, 2025*; 7:00 p.m., ACCNX | | Tarleton State | W 96–76 | 1–0 | 21 – Pierre Jr. | 8 – Yiğitoğlu | 5 – Miller | Moody Coliseum (4,626); Dallas, TX |
| November 6, 2025*; 7:00 p.m., ACCNX | | Texas A&M–Corpus Christi | W 69–58 | 2–0 | 14 – Miller | 10 – Yiğitoğlu | 6 – Miller | Moody Coliseum (4,222); Dallas, TX |
| November 11, 2025*; 7:00 p.m., ACCNX | | Murray State | W 102–91 | 3–0 | 28 – Miller | 11 – Washington | 6 – Miller | Moody Coliseum (4,348); Dallas, TX |
| November 15, 2025*; 1:00 p.m., The CW | | Butler | W 87–85 | 4–0 | 23 – Miller | 7 – Pierre Jr. | 12 – Miller | Moody Coliseum (5,383); Dallas, TX |
| November 18, 2025*; 7:00 p.m., ACCNX | | Arkansas–Pine Bluff | W 106–60 | 5–0 | 23 – Pierre Jr. | 7 – Tied | 10 – Miller | Moody Coliseum (4,347); Dallas, TX |
| November 21, 2025*; 8:00 p.m., ACCNX | | Arkansas State | W 100–69 | 6–0 | 24 – Edwards | 6 – Washington | 13 – Edwards | Moody Coliseum (4,502); Dallas, TX |
| November 24, 2025*; 7:00 p.m., ACCNX | | Radford | W 89–72 | 7–0 | 25 – Miller | 13 – Pierre Jr. | 10 – Miller | Moody Coliseum (4,421); Dallas, TX |
| November 28, 2025*; 6:00 p.m., SECN | | at Mississippi State | W 87–81 ^{OT} | 8–0 | 28 – Miller | 13 – Yiğitoğlu | 3 – Tied | Humphrey Coliseum (7,810); Starkville, MS |
| December 3, 2025*; 8:00 p.m., SECN | | at No. 17 Vanderbilt; ACC–SEC Challenge | L 69–88 | 8–1 | 17 – Miller | 8 – Yiğitoğlu | 6 – Miller | Memorial Gymnasium (7,437); Nashville, TN |
| December 7, 2025*; 4:00 p.m., ESPN2 | | vs. Texas A&M; Hoop Hype XL College Basketball Showcase | W 93–80 ^{OT} | 9–1 | 35 – Pierre Jr. | 9 – Edwards | 11 – Edwards | College Park Center (2,800); Arlington, TX |
| December 13, 2025*; 7:30 p.m., SECN | | vs. LSU; Compete 4 Cause Classic | L 77–89 | 9–2 | 16 – Tied | 10 – Yiğitoğlu | 4 – Miller | Smoothie King Center; New Orleans, LA |
| December 21, 2025*; 1:00 p.m., ACCNX | | Central Arkansas | W 99–82 | 10–2 | 23 – Miller | 11 – Yiğitoğlu | 8 – Miller | Moody Coliseum (4,634); Dallas, TX |
| December 28, 2025*; 2:00 p.m., ACCNX | | Cal State Fullerton | W 110–63 | 11–2 | 21 – Tied | 12 – Yiğitoğlu | 12 – Miller | Moody Coliseum (4,584); Dallas, TX |
ACC regular season
| January 3, 2026; 1:15 p.m., The CW | | No. 12 North Carolina | W 97–83 | 12–2 (1–0) | 27 – Miller | 6 – Washington | 12 – Miller | Moody Coliseum (6,698); Dallas, TX |
| January 7, 2026; 8:00 p.m., ESPNU | No. 24 | at Clemson | L 70–74 | 12–3 (1–1) | 23 – Miller | 11 – Yiğitoğlu | 4 – Edwards | Littlejohn Coliseum (8,134); Clemson, SC |
| January 10, 2026; 1:00 p.m., ESPN | No. 24 | at No. 6 Duke | L 75–82 | 12–4 (1–2) | 23 – Toombs | 7 – Tied | 5 – Edwards | Cameron Indoor Stadium (9,314); Durham, NC |
| January 14, 2026; 8:00 p.m., ESPNU | | Virginia Tech | W 77–76 | 13–4 (2–2) | 24 – Miller | 10 – Toombs | 6 – Miller | Moody Coliseum (5,048); Dallas, TX |
| January 17, 2026; 11:00 a.m., ESPN2 | | No. 16 Virginia | L 68–72 | 13–5 (2–3) | 16 – Pierre Jr. | 6 – Edwards | 5 – Edwards | Moody Coliseum (6,630); Dallas, TX |
| January 20, 2026; 8:00 p.m., ACCN | | at Wake Forest | W 91–79 | 14–5 (3–3) | 24 – Edwards | 9 – Toombs | 7 – Edwards | LJVM Coliseum (7,579); Winston-Salem, NC |
| January 24, 2026; 3:00 p.m., ACCN | | Florida State | W 83–80 | 15–5 (4–3) | 28 – Pierre Jr. | 11 – Yiğitoğlu | 6 – Miller | Moody Coliseum (5,974); Dallas, TX |
| January 31, 2026; 1:00 p.m., ESPN | | at No. 20 Louisville | L 74–88 | 15–6 (4–4) | 20 – Miller | 8 – Tied | 4 – Miller | KFC Yum! Center (14,847); Louisville, KY |
| February 3, 2026; 8:00 p.m., ESPN2 | | NC State | L 83–84 | 15–7 (4–5) | 23 – Pierre Jr. | 9 – Tied | 8 – Miller | Moody Coliseum (5,924); Dallas, TX |
| February 7, 2026; 1:00 p.m., The CW | | at Pittsburgh | W 86–67 | 16–7 (5–5) | 21 – Pierre Jr. | 8 – Yiğitoğlu | 9 – Miller | Petersen Events Center (6,680); Pittsburgh, PA |
| February 10, 2026; 6:00 p.m., ACCN | | Notre Dame | W 89–81 | 17–7 (6–5) | 22 – Pierre Jr. | 10 – Yiğitoğlu | 7 – Miller | Moody Coliseum (5,819); Dallas, TX |
| February 14, 2026; 1:00 p.m., The CW | | at Syracuse | L 78–79 | 17–8 (6–6) | 13 – Washington | 9 – Washington | 7 – Miller | JMA Wireless Dome (19,680); Syracuse, NY |
| February 17, 2026; 6:00 p.m., ESPN2 | | No. 21 Louisville | W 95–85 | 18–8 (7–6) | 25 – Pierre Jr. | 7 – Pierre Jr. | 9 – Miller | Moody Coliseum (6,326); Dallas, TX |
| February 21, 2026; 3:00 p.m., ACCN | | Boston College | W 94–70 | 19–8 (8–6) | 16 – O'Neal Jr. | 6 – Tied | 7 – Miller | Moody Coliseum (7,106); Dallas, TX |
| February 25, 2026; 9:00 p.m., ACCN | | at California | L 69–73 | 19–9 (8–7) | 15 – Tied | 9 – Washington | 4 – Miller | Haas Pavilion (4,411); Berkeley, CA |
| February 28, 2026; 5:00 p.m., ACCN | | at Stanford | L 75–95 | 19–10 (8–8) | 26 – Miller | 7 – Yiğitoğlu | 5 – Miller | Maples Pavilion (4,493); Stanford, CA |
| March 4, 2026; 6:00 p.m., ACCN | | No. 22 Miami | L 69–77 | 19–11 (8–9) | 27 – Pierre Jr. | 7 – Tied | 6 – Miller | Moody Coliseum (6,849); Dallas, TX |
| March 7, 2026; 1:00 p.m., ACCN | | at Florida State | L 78–91 | 19–12 (8–10) | 32 – Miller | 9 – Yiğitoğlu | 6 – Pierre Jr. | Donald L. Tucker Civic Center (6,757); Tallahassee, FL |
ACC tournament
| March 10, 2026*; 3:30 p.m., ACCN | (11) | vs. (14) Syracuse; First round | W 86–69 | 20–12 | 25 – Miller | 11 – Tied | 6 – Toombs | Spectrum Center (6,593); Charlotte, NC |
| March 11, 2026*; 2:30 p.m., ESPN | (11) | vs. (6) No. 24 Louisville; Second round | L 58–62 | 20–13 | 17 – Pierre Jr. | 9 – Toombs | 4 – Miller | Spectrum Center (8,116); Charlotte, NC |
NCAA tournament
| March 18, 2026*; 8:15 p.m., truTV | (11 MW) | vs. (11 MW) Miami (OH); First Four | L 79–89 | 20–14 | 20 – Toombs | 11 – Toombs | 5 – Miller | UD Arena (12,558); Dayton, OH |
*Non-conference game. ^{#}Rankings from AP poll. (#) Tournament seedings in parentheses. MW=Midwest. All times are in Central Time.

== Rankings ==
Ranking movements Legend: ██ Increase in ranking ██ Decrease in ranking — = Not ranked RV = Received votes
| | Week | | | | | | | | | | | | | | | | | | | | |
| Poll | Pre | 1 | 2 | 3 | 4 | 5 | 6 | 7 | 8 | 9 | 10 | 11 | 12 | 13 | 14 | 15 | 16 | 17 | 18 | 19 | Final |
|---|---|---|---|---|---|---|---|---|---|---|---|---|---|---|---|---|---|---|---|---|---|
| AP | — | — | — | — | RV | RV | — | — | — | 24 | RV | RV | RV | — | — | — | RV | — | — | — | — |
| Coaches | — | — | — | RV | RV | RV | RV | — | — | 25 | RV | RV | RV | — | — | — | — | — | — | — | — |
