= Caldwell Academy =

American private Christian school in North Carolina

Location
- 2900 Horse Pen Creek Road; Guilford County; Greensboro, North Carolina 27410; United States
- Coordinates: 36°08′12″N 79°53′15″W

Information
- Type: Private; college-preparatory; day; Christian school
- Motto: Classical, Christian, Community
- Religious affiliation: Christian
- Established: 1994 (32 years ago)
- CEEB code: 341593
- Principal: Janet Speckman (Grammar principal); Kristen Plasman (Dialectic and Rhetoric principal)
- Head of school: Dr. Tim Holland
- Faculty: 90
- Grades: Preschool–12th grade
- Gender: Co-Educational
- Enrollment: 558
- Student to teacher ratio: 15:1
- Campus type: Rural
- Colors: Blue and white
- Athletics: 29 Athletic Teams
- Athletics conference: North Carolina Independent Schools Athletic Association (NCISAA); Triad Athletic Conference (TAC); Triad Middle School Athletic Conference (TMAC)
- Sports: baseball, basketball, cheerleading, cross country, golf, soccer, swimming, tennis, track & field, volleyball
- Mascot: Eagle
- Nickname: Eagles
- Rivals: Greensboro Day School
- Accreditation: Cognia; Association of Christian Schools International
- School fees: $100 (application) $75 (assessment)
- Tuition: $8,600–$17,800
- Website: www.caldwellacademy.org

Caldwell Academy is a private, college preparatory, Classical Christian school located in Greensboro, North Carolina, United States. Caldwell provides a TK–12 education from a Classical Christian perspective.

== History ==
Caldwell Academy is named after David Caldwell (1725–1824). He was an early era minister in Guilford County as well as an educator and physician. He was born in Pennsylvania in 1725 and came to the area in order to pastor Buffalo and Alamance Presbyterian Churches. Along with his pastoral duties David Caldwell founded a Log-College. This served as the first schoolhouse in Guilford County.

In 1994, an organization of families in Greensboro, North Carolina sought to establish a school for their children that would teach from a Christian stance. The name "Caldwell Academy" was derived from the life of David Caldwell, a Greensboro native who operated in the late-18th and early-19th century. In 1995 the school opened in the fall with a few hundred students ranging from kindergarten to 6th grade. The school was originally operating out of rented space at a local church until its move to a permanent location in the summer of 1999. The permanent location started off with "Founders Hall" and "Smith Building" along with some modulars. Over the summer of 2007 a new grammar building, "Munchkin Hall" was built and K–5 was moved to the new building. Later that year they finished the construction of a new athletic facility equipped with a soccer field, multi-purpose/practice field, and a baseball diamond.

== Admissions ==
All students who plan to attend Caldwell Academy must first apply and complete an online form and will soon be evaluated on a rolling basis. After completing the first step in the admissions process, applicants can schedule a campus visit and have an in person interview before any decisions on enrollment.

== A Classical Education ==
Caldwell Academy has four divisions: the Preschool, the Grammar School (grades K–5), the Dialectic School (grades 6-8), and the Rhetoric School (grades 9–12). The divisions form a cohesive whole which allows and encourages students to pursue their education in increasingly mature and complex ways as they grow and develop.

=== Grammar ===
In a classical school, the instructional goal for grammar school students is mastery of the fundamental facts and rules of each subject. The students are to accumulate a broad core knowledge. The methodology involves memorization, repetition, and chants combined with the study of Latin introduced in 3rd grade.

=== Dialectic ===
Dialectic School (grades 6–8) is where students continue to add to the core knowledge from their Grammar years, and begin work on mastering the skills (studying, organization, test-taking, public speaking) needed to be successful during the Rhetoric (high school) years.

=== Rhetoric ===
Rhetoric school (grades 9–12) students learn how to express what they know and what they are learning through the use of debate, apologetics, public speaking, essay writing, and drama.

== Athletics ==
The Caldwell Academy Eagles compete in the North Carolina Independent Schools Athletic Association, Triad Athletic Conference, and Triad Middle School Athletic Conference.

=== State Championships ===
- Girls Soccer – 2011
- Boys Swimming – 2011, 2021, 2022, 2023
- Girls Swimming – 2011, 2013
- Girls Track & Field – 2009
- Girls Volleyball – 2015, 2020

== Accreditations ==
Caldwell Academy is fully accredited by Cognia and the Association of Christian Schools International.
