= Paul McNeil =

American basketball player (born 2006)

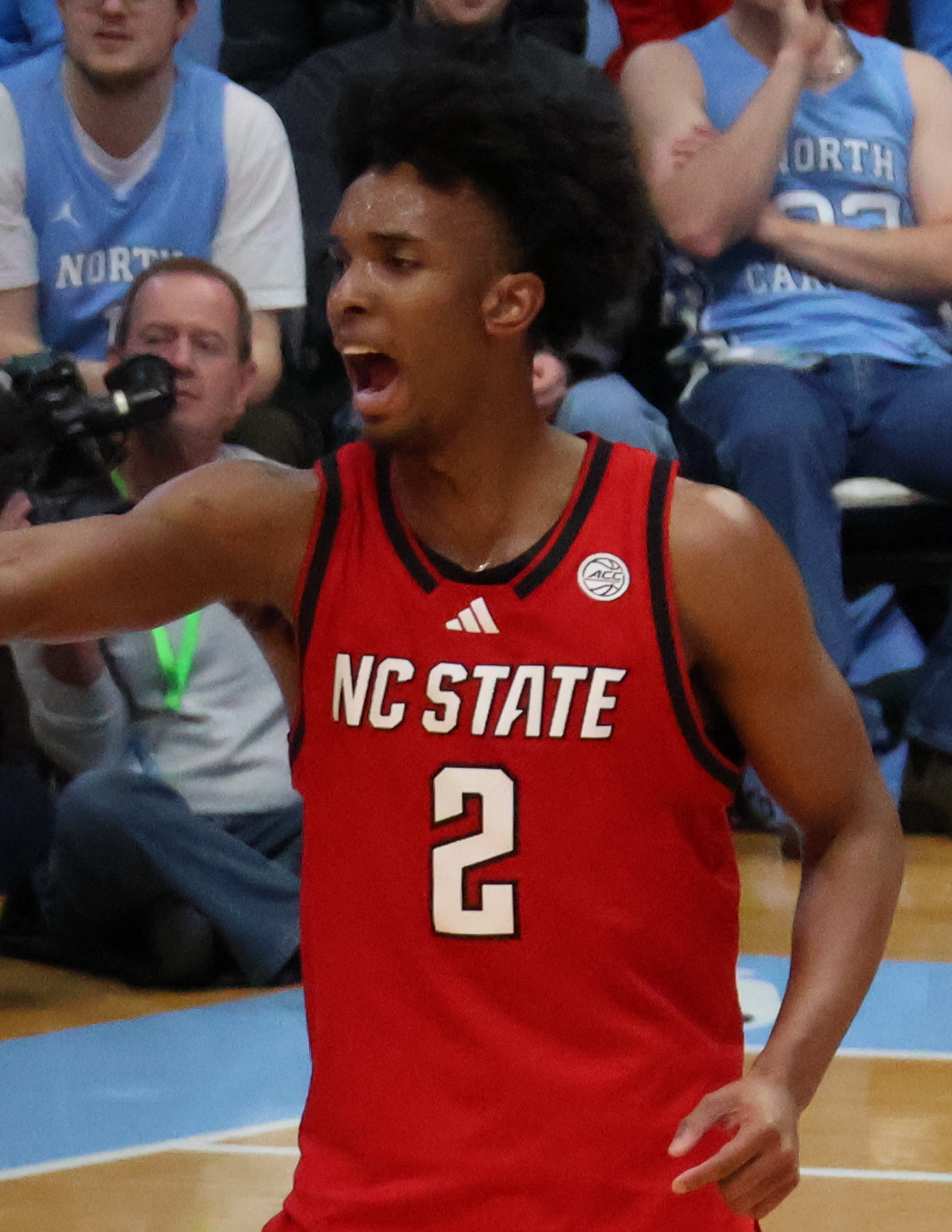
- McNeil in 2025

No. 2 – NC State Wolfpack
- Position: Shooting guard
- Conference: Atlantic Coast Conference

Personal information
- Born: April 19, 2006 (age 20)
- Listed height: 6 ft 5 in (1.96 m)
- Listed weight: 190 lb (86 kg)

Career information
- High school: Richmond Senior (Rockingham, North Carolina)
- College: NC State (2024–present)

Paul McNeil Jr. (born April 19, 2006) is an American college basketball player for the NC State Wolfpack of the Atlantic Coast Conference (ACC).

== Early life and high school ==
McNeil grew up in Rockingham, North Carolina and attended Richmond Senior High School. He was named the North Carolina Gatorade Player of the Year as a sophomore after averaging 24.5 points, 9.7 rebounds, 3.8 assists, 1.8 blocks, and 1.7 steals per game. During his senior season, McNeil set a North Carolina single-game record when he scored 71 points against Lee County High School. He finished his high school career as Richmond's all-time leading scorer with 2,448 points. McNeil was rated a four-star recruit and committed to play college basketball at NC State over offers from Clemson, Indiana, Tennessee, Illinois, Alabama, Miami, and LSU.

== College career ==
McNeil averaged 4.2 points and 1.3 rebounds over 24 games played during his freshman season.
