= Matt Able =

American basketball player (born 2007)

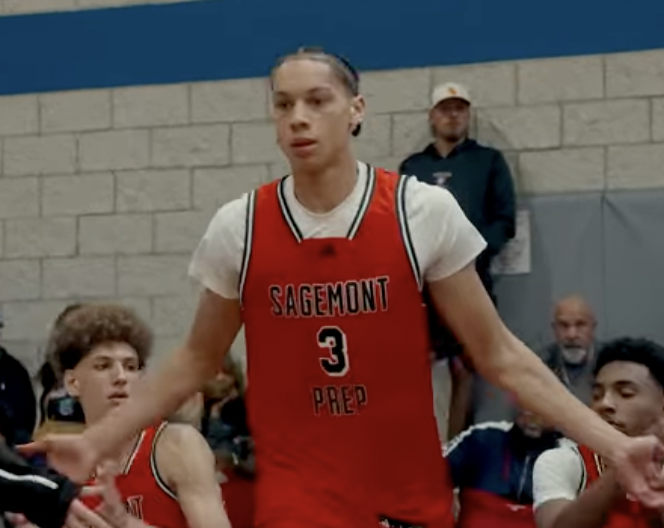
- Able in 2025

No. 3 – North Carolina Tar Heels
- Position: Shooting guard
- Conference: Atlantic Coast Conference

Personal information
- Born: July 12, 2007 (age 19)
- Listed height: 6 ft 5 in (1.96 m)
- Listed weight: 200 lb (91 kg)

Career information
- High school: Parrish Community (Parrish, Florida); Berkeley Preparatory (Tampa, Florida); Sagemont School (Weston, Florida)
- College: NC State (2025–2026); North Carolina (2026–present)

Douglas Matthew Able (born July 12, 2007) is an American college basketball player for the North Carolina Tar Heels of the Atlantic Coast Conference (ACC). He previously played for the NC State Wolfpack.

== Early life and high school ==
Able initially attended Parrish Community High School in Parrish, Florida. He averaged 17 points, 6 rebounds, 4 assists and 2 steals per game as a freshman. Able transferred to Berkeley Preparatory School in Tampa, Florida after his sophomore year and transferred a second time to the Sagemont School one year later. He averaged 20.4 points, 5.9 rebounds, 3.7 steals, and 2.9 assists per game as a senior.

Able was rated a four-star recruit and initially committed to play college basketball at Miami shortly before the start of his senior year of high school. He later de-committed in wake of Hurricanes' head coach Jim Larrañaga decision to retire mid-season. Able later committed to play at NC State over offers from Alabama, Baylor, Michigan, Tennessee, and Texas.

== College career ==
Able entered his freshman season at NC State coming off the bench as part of the Wolpack's main playing rotation. He averaged 8.8 points and 3.4 rebounds per game. Following the season, Able announced that he would enter the transfer portal and would be an early entrant in the 2026 NBA draft. On April 21, 2026, Able announced that he transferred to North Carolina.
