= 2026–27 Miami Hurricanes men's basketball team =

American college basketball season

2026–27 Miami Hurricanes men's basketball
- Conference: Atlantic Coast Conference

Ranking
- Coaches: No. 17
- AP: No. 17
- Record: 5–1 (0–0 ACC)
- Head coach: Jai Lucas (2nd season)
- Associate head coach: Erik Pastrana & Charlton Young (2nd season)
- Assistant coaches: Andrew Moran (2nd season); Russell Springmann (2nd season)
- Home arena: Watsco Center

2026–27 ACC men's basketball standings
	Conf.				Overall
Team	W		L	PCT	W		L	PCT
No. 4 Virginia	0	–	0	–	7	–	0	1.000
Pittsburgh	0	–	0	–	6	–	0	1.000
SMU	0	–	0	–	6	–	0	1.000
Virginia Tech	0	–	0	–	6	–	0	1.000
Boston College	0	–	0	–	5	–	0	1.000
Notre Dame	0	–	0	–	6	–	1	.857
Florida State	0	–	0	–	5	–	1	.833
Georgia Tech	0	–	0	–	5	–	1	.833
No. 17 Miami (FL)	0	–	0	–	5	–	1	.833
NC State	0	–	0	–	5	–	1	.833
Stanford	0	–	0	–	5	–	1	.833
Clemson	0	–	0	–	4	–	1	.800
North Carolina	0	–	0	–	4	–	1	.800
Wake Forest	0	–	0	–	4	–	1	.800
No. 23 Louisville	0	–	0	–	3	–	1	.750
California	0	–	0	–	4	–	2	.667
No. 5 Duke	0	–	0	–	3	–	2	.600
Syracuse	0	–	0	–	3	–	2	.600
† 2027 ACC tournament winner As of November 22, 2026; Rankings from AP poll

The 2026–27 Miami Hurricanes men's basketball team represents the University of Miami during the 2026–27 NCAA Division I men's basketball season as members of the Atlantic Coast Conference (ACC). The Hurricanes are led by second-year head coach Jai Lucas and play home games at the Watsco Center on campus in Coral Gables, Florida.

Benchmark International Arena during a Miami Hurricanes basketball game against the Florida Gators in November 2026

== Previous season ==
The Hurricanes finished the season 26–9 and 13–5 in ACC play to finish in third place. As the 3rd seed in the 2026 ACC tournament, they would beat (6th seed) No. 24 Louisville in the Quarterfinals, but would lose to (2nd seed) No. 10 Virginia in the Semifnals. They were invited to the NCAA tournament as the 7th seed in the West Regional were they would beat 10th seed Missouri in the first round, but would lose to 2nd seed Purdue in the Second Round.

== Preseason ==
On October 13, 2026, the Atlantic Coast Conference released their preseason poll. Miami was picked to finish fourth in the conference, receiving one out of a possible 48 first place votes.

=== Preseason rankings ===
ACC Preseason Poll
Place	Team	Points
1	Duke	861 (45)
2	Virginia	778 (1)
3	Louisville	758 (1)
4	Miami	753 (1)
5	North Carolina	658
6	Clemson	623
7	Florida State	519
8	NC State	502
9	Virginia Tech	489
10	SMU	443
11	Syracuse	353
12	Pittsburgh	323
13	Stanford	267
14	Wake Forest	234
15	California	225
16	Notre Dame	153
17	Boston College	150
18	Georgia Tech	119
(#) first-place votes

=== Preseason All-ACC Teams ===
Preseason All-ACC Teams
Team	Name	Year
First	Shelton Henderson	Sophomore
Second	Malik Reneau	Fifth Year

== Roster ==
2026–27 Miami Hurricanes men's basketball team
Players
Coaches

Pos.	#	Name	Height	Weight	Year	Previous school	Hometown
F	0	DeSean Goode	6 ft 8 in (2.03 m)	232 lb (105 kg)	Jr	Robert Morris	Fairmont, West Virginia
G	1	Brent Bland	6 ft 3 in (1.91 m)	229 lb (104 kg)	GS	Saint Peter's	Wheatley Heights, New York
C	2	Somto Cyril	6 ft 11 in (2.11 m)	263 lb (119 kg)	Jr	Georgia	Enugu, Nigeria
G	3	Nick Dorn	6 ft 7 in (2.01 m)	222 lb (101 kg)	Sr	Indiana	Charlotte, North Carolina
F	4	Marcus Allen	6 ft 7 in (2.01 m)	231 lb (105 kg)	Jr	Missouri	Miami, Florida
F	5	Malik Reneau (5th)	6 ft 9 in (2.06 m)	247 lb (112 kg)	Sr	Indiana	Miami, Florida
F	6	Robert Miller III	6 ft 10 in (2.08 m)	226 lb (103 kg)	Jr	LSU	Houston, Texas
F	7	Shelton Henderson	6 ft 6 in (1.98 m)	239 lb (108 kg)	So	Bellaire High School	Houston, Texas
F	8	Chris Birden Jr.	6 ft 10 in (2.08 m)	190 lb (86 kg)	Fr	South Kent School	New Orleans, Louisiana
C	10	Egor Ryzhov	6 ft 11 in (2.11 m)	253 lb (115 kg)	Sr	BC Enisey	Saint Petersburg, Russia
F	11	Caleb Gaskins	6 ft 8 in (2.03 m)	221 lb (100 kg)	Fr	Christopher Columbus High School	Melbourne, Florida
G	12	Quin Berger	6 ft 2 in (1.88 m)	194 lb (88 kg)	Sr	Bucknell	Malvern, Pennsylvania
G	13	L.J. Cason	6 ft 2 in (1.88 m)	195 lb (88 kg)	Jr	Michigan	Lakeland, Florida
G	35	Dante Allen	6 ft 4 in (1.93 m)	225 lb (102 kg)	So	Montverde Academy	Miami, Florida
G	55	Acaden Lewis	6 ft 2 in (1.88 m)	187 lb (85 kg)	So	Villanova	Washington, D.C.

Head coach

- Jai Lucas (Texas)

Assistant coach(es)

- Erik Pastrana (Florida State)
- Charlton Young (Georgia Southern)
- Andrew Moran (Florida State)
- Russell Springmann (Salisbury)
- Riley Welch (Kentucky)

Legend

- (C) Team captain
- (S) Suspended
- (I) Ineligible
- (W) Walk-on
- (5th) Fifth-year senior
- Injured
- Current redshirt

Roster
Last update: October 31, 2026

== Schedule and results ==
Date time, TV	Rank^{#}	Opponent^{#}	Result	Record	High points	High rebounds	High assists	Site (attendance) city, state
Exhibition
October 23, 2026*; 6:00 p.m.	No. 14	No. 24 Vanderbilt	W 109–96		23 – Lewis	6 – Tied	10 – Lewis	Watsco Center (2,857); Coral Gables, Florida
Non-conference regular season
November 2, 2026*; 6:00 p.m., ESPN2	No. 14	vs. No. 1 Florida; Orion180 Tip-Off Classic	L 67–77	0–1	24 – Lewis	9 – Henderson	3 – Allen	Benchmark International Arena (15,324); Tampa, Florida
November 6, 2026*; 9:00 p.m., ACCN	No. 14	Wagner	W 83–57	1–1	19 – Henderson	6 – Tied	5 – Tied	Watsco Center (5,707); Coral Gables, Florida
November 9, 2026*; 7:00 p.m., ACCN	No. 17	North Florida	W 89–51	2–1	16 – Reneau	8 – Tied	8 – Lewis	Watsco Center (4,203); Coral Gables, Florida
November 13, 2026*; 5:00 p.m., ACCN	No. 17	North Alabama	W 94–52	3–1	26 – Bland	12 – Henderson	12 – Allen	Watsco Center (3,862); Coral Gables, Florida
November 17, 2026*; 7:00 p.m., ACCNX	No. 17	Rider	W 95–48	4–1	15 – Cyril	10 – Henderson	4 – Lewis	Watsco Center (3,589); Coral Gables, Florida
November 20, 2026*; 5:00 p.m., ACCN	No. 17	Manhattan	W 106–54	5–1	21 – Tied	8 – Tied	7 – Lewis	Watsco Center (3,677); Coral Gables, Florida
November 24, 2026*; 3:00 p.m., ESPNU		vs. TCU; Players Era 16 Bracket 2 First Round						T-Mobile Arena; Paradise, Nevada
November 26, 2026*; TBD, TBD		vs. Michigan or Creighton; Players Era 16 Bracket 2						T-Mobile Arena; Paradise, Nevada
December 2, 2026*; 9:15 p.m., ESPN		Alabama; ACC–SEC Challenge						Watsco Center; Coral Gables, Florida
December 5, 2026*; 5;00 p.m., ACCN		Stetson						Watsco Center; Coral Gables, Florida
December 12, 2026*; 5:30 p.m., ESPN		vs. Texas; Houston Hoopfest						Toyota Center; Houston, Texas
December 16, 2026*; 7:00 p.m., ACCNX		Alcorn State						Watsco Center; Coral Gables, Florida
December 21, 2026*; 1:00 p.m., ACCNX		USC Upstate						Watsco Center; Coral Gables, Florida
ACC regular season
December 29, 2026; 8:00 p.m., ACCN		NC State						Watsco Center; Coral Gable, Florida
January 2, 2027; 2:00 p.m., ESPN or ESPN2		at Pittsburgh						Petersen Events Center; Pittsburgh, Pennsylvania
January 5, 2027; 7:00 p.m., ACCN		at Georgia Tech						McCamish Pavilion; Atlanta, Georgia
January 9, 2027; 3:00 p.m., ACCN		Syracuse						Watsco Center; Coral Gable, Florida
January 16, 2027; 6:00 p.m., ESPN or ESPN2		Virginia						Watsco Center; Coral Gable, Florida
January 19, 2027; 7:00 p.m., ESPN, ESPN2 or ESPNU		at Louisville						KFC Yum! Center; Louisville, Kentucky
January 23, 2027; 6:00 p.m., ESPN, ESPN2 or ESPNU		at Virginia Tech						Cassell Coliseum; Blacksburg, Virginia
January 27, 2027; 7:00 p.m., ESPN2 or ESPNU		Clemson						Watsco Center; Coral Gable, Florida
January 30, 2027; 12:00 p.m., The CW		Wake Forest						Watsco Center; Coral Gable, Florida
February 1, 2027; 7:00 p.m., ESPN		at Duke						Cameron Indoor Stadium; Durham, North Carolina
February 6, 2027; 2:00 p.m., ESPN or ESPN2		Florida State						Watsco Center; Coral Gable, Florida
February 10, 2027; 9:00 p.m., ESPN2 or ESPNU		at Stanford						Maples Pavilion; Stanford, California
February 13, 2027; 10:00 p.m., ESPN2		at California						Haas Pavilion; Berkeley, California
February 20, 2027; 4:30 p.m., ACCN		Notre Dame						Watsco Center; Coral Gable, Florida
February 22, 2027; 7:00 p.m., ESPN		at North Carolina						Dean Smith Center; Chapel Hill, North Carolina
February 27, 2027; 6:00/6:30 p.m., ESPN or ESPN2		Pittsburgh						Watsco Center; Coral Gable, Florida
March 2, 2027; 7:00 p.m., ESPN, ESPN2, ESPNU or ACCN		SMU						Watsco Center; Coral Gable, Florida
March 6, 2027; 2:00 p.m., ESPN or ESPNU		at Florida State						Donald L. Tucker Center; Tallahassee, Florida
ACC tournament
March 9-13, 2027; TBD, TBD		vs. TBD; ACC Tournament						First Horizon Coliseum; Greensboro, North Carolina
*Non-conference game. ^{#}Rankings from AP poll. (#) Tournament seedings in parentheses. All times are in Eastern Time.

== Rankings ==
Ranking movements Legend: ██ Increase in ranking ██ Decrease in ranking
	Week																				
Poll	Pre	1	2	3	4	5	6	7	8	9	10	11	12	13	14	15	16	17	18	19	Final
AP	14	17	17																		
Coaches	17	18	17																		
