= 2026–27 Louisville Cardinals men's basketball team =

American college basketball season

2026–27 Louisville Cardinals men's basketball
- Conference: Atlantic Coast Conference

Ranking
- Coaches: No. 18
- AP: No. 23
- Record: 3–1 (0–0 ACC)
- Head coach: Pat Kelsey (3rd season)
- Assistant coaches: John Andrzejek; Sean Dixon; Ronnie Hamilton; Mike Cassidy; Jermaine Ukaegbu
- Home arena: KFC Yum! Center

2026–27 ACC men's basketball standings
	Conf.				Overall
Team	W		L	PCT	W		L	PCT
No. 4 Virginia	0	–	0	–	6	–	0	1.000
Boston College	0	–	0	–	5	–	0	1.000
Georgia Tech	0	–	0	–	5	–	0	1.000
NC State	0	–	0	–	5	–	0	1.000
Pittsburgh	0	–	0	–	5	–	0	1.000
SMU	0	–	0	–	5	–	0	1.000
Virginia Tech	0	–	0	–	5	–	0	1.000
Notre Dame	0	–	0	–	6	–	1	.857
Stanford	0	–	0	–	5	–	1	.833
Clemson	0	–	0	–	4	–	1	.800
Florida State	0	–	0	–	4	–	1	.800
No. 17 Miami (FL)	0	–	0	–	4	–	1	.800
Wake Forest	0	–	0	–	4	–	1	.800
No. 23 Louisville	0	–	0	–	3	–	1	.750
North Carolina	0	–	0	–	3	–	1	.750
California	0	–	0	–	4	–	2	.667
No. 5 Duke	0	–	0	–	3	–	2	.600
Syracuse	0	–	0	–	3	–	2	.600
† 2027 ACC tournament winner As of November 20, 2026; Rankings from AP poll

The 2026–27 Louisville Cardinals men's basketball team represents the University of Louisville during the 2026–27 NCAA Division I men's basketball season. The team plays its home games on Denny Crum Court at the KFC Yum! Center in downtown Louisville, Kentucky as members of the Atlantic Coast Conference (ACC). They are led by third-year head coach Pat Kelsey.

== Previous season ==
The Cardinals finished the 2025–26 season with a record of 24–11, 11–7 in ACC play, finishing 6th in the conference. As the sixth seed in the 2026 ACC tournament, they earned a bye into the Second Round where they defeated SMU by four points. Their run ended there as they lost to Miami in a re-match of their final regular season game. The Cardinals earned an at-large bid to the NCAA tournament and were the six-seed in the East region. They defeated eleven-seed South Florida in the First Round before losing to third-seed and eleventh ranked Michigan State in the Second Round to end their season.

== Offseason ==
=== Coaching staff ===
Louisville saw significant turn over in its coaching staff with three assistant coaches leaving. Brian Kloman took the general manager position with the Auburn Tigers. Thomas Carr took a position with Indiana. Former Louisville player and national champion Peyton Siva left for a position at St. John's to coach under his former Louisville head coach Rick Pitino.

Louisville hired John Andrzejek as associate head coach and defensive coordinator. Andrzejek spent one season as head coach of Campbell before resigning to join the Cardinals. He also spent two seasons with the Florida Gators where he helped lead them to the 2025 national championship.

=== Departures ===
Departures
Name	Number	Pos.	Height	Weight	Year	Hometown	Reason for departure
Mikel Brown Jr.	0	G	6'5"	180	Freshman	Orlando, FL	Declared for 2026 NBA Draft; selected 6th overall by the Brooklyn Nets
J'Vonne Hadley	1	G	6'7"	210	Graduate Student	St. Paul, MN	Graduated and signed two-way contract with the Miami Heat
Ryan Conwell	3	G	6'4"	215	Senior	Indianapolis, IN	Graduated; Selected 37th overall by the Oklahoma City Thunder and traded to the Miami Heat
Cole Sherman	4	G	5'11"	190	Senior	Louisville, KY	Graduated
Kasean Pryor	7	F	6'10"	230	Graduate Student	Chicago, IL	Graduated
Khani Rooths	9	F	6'10"	210	Sophomore	Washington, D.C.	Transferred to Oklahoma
Isaac McKneely	10	G	6'4"	195	Senior	Poca, WV	Graduated and signed an exhibit 10 contract with the Atlanta Hawks
Kobe Rodgers	11	G	6'3"	185	Redshirt Senior	Cincinnati, OH	Graduated
Mouhamed Camara	12	F	6'8"	225	Freshman	Dakar, Senegal	Transferred to Eastern Kentucky
Sananda Fru	13	F/C	6'11"	245	Junior	Berlin, Germany	Transferred to Marquette
Aly Khalifa	15	C	7'0"	250	Redshirt Senior	Alexandria, Egypt	Graduated
Vangelis Zougris	53	F/C	6'8"	240	Junior	Peristeri, Greece	Transferred to Saint Mary's
Spencer Legg	55	G	6'7"	200	Senior	Washington, D.C.	Graduated

=== Incoming transfers ===
Departures
Name	Number	Pos.	Height	Weight	Year	Hometown	Reason for departure
Karter Knox	1	G	6'6"	220	Junior	Tampa, FL	Arkansas
Jackson Shelstad	3	G	6'1"	185	Senior	West Linn, OR	Oregon
Seth Trimble	5	G	6'3"	200	Graduate Student	Menomonee Falls, WI	North Carolina
Alvaro Folgueiras	7	F	6'10"	230	Senior	Malaga, Spain	Iowa
De'Shayne Montgomery	11	G	6'4"	200	Senior	Fort Lauderdale, FL	Dayton
Flory Bidunga	40	F	6'9"	235	Junior	Kinshasa, DRC	Kansas
Gabe Dynes	45	C	7'5"	230	Senior	Independence, KY	USC
LJ Wells	53	F	6'8"	220	Graduate Student	Eau Claire, WI	Northern Kentucky

== Roster ==
2026–27 Louisville Cardinals men's basketball team
Players
Coaches

Pos.	#	Name	Height	Weight	Year	Previous school	Hometown
G	1	Karter Knox	6 ft 6 in (1.98 m)	220 lb (100 kg)	Jr	Arkansas	Tampa, FL
G	3	Jackson Shelstad	6 ft 1 in (1.85 m)	185 lb (84 kg)	Sr	Oregon	West Linn, OR
G	5	Seth Trimble	6 ft 3 in (1.91 m)	200 lb (91 kg)	GS	North Carolina	Menomonee Falls, WI
F	6	Boyuan Zhang	6 ft 9 in (2.06 m)	220 lb (100 kg)	Fr	Veritas Academy	Changchun, China
F	7	Alvaro Folgueiras	6 ft 10 in (2.08 m)	230 lb (104 kg)	Sr	Iowa	Malaga, Spain
G	11	De'Shayne Montgomery	6 ft 4 in (1.93 m)	200 lb (91 kg)	Sr	Dayton	Fort Lauderdale, FL
G	14	Adrian Wooley	6 ft 4 in (1.93 m)	205 lb (93 kg)	Jr	Kennesaw State	Tuscaloosa, AL
C	15	Obinna Ekezie Jr.	7 ft 2 in (2.18 m)	240 lb (109 kg)	Fr	Southeastern Prep	Lagos, Nigeria
G	22	Isaac Ellis	6 ft 1 in (1.85 m)	185 lb (84 kg)	Fr	Overtime Elite	Hickory, NC
G	33	Will Hanke (W)	6 ft 4 in (1.93 m)	200 lb (91 kg)	Fr	St. Xavier High School	Louisville, KY
F	40	Flory Bidunga	6 ft 9 in (2.06 m)	235 lb (107 kg)	Jr	Kansas	Kinshasa, Democratic Republic of Congo
C	45	Gabe Dynes	7 ft 5 in (2.26 m)	230 lb (104 kg)	Sr	USC	Independece, KY
F	53	LJ Wells	6 ft 8 in (2.03 m)	220 lb (100 kg)	GS	Northern Kentucky	Eau Claire, WI

Head coach

- Pat Kelsey (Xavier)

Assistant coach(es)

- John Andrzejek (Columbia)
- Sean Dixon (Presbyterian)
- Ronnie Hamilton (Duke)
- Mike Cassidy (ACPE)
- Jermaine Ukaegbu (Winthrop)
- Mitch Johnson (Cincinnati)

Legend

- (C) Team captain
- (S) Suspended
- (I) Ineligible
- (W) Walk-on
- Injured
- Current redshirt

Roster
Last update: October 3, 2026

== Schedule and results ==
Date time, TV	Rank^{#}	Opponent^{#}	Result	Record	High points	High rebounds	High assists	Site (attendance) city, state
Exhibition
July 28, 2026*; 2:00 p.m.		Bahamas Raw Talent; 2026 Baha Mar Summer League	W 101–52	–	20 – Montgomery	10 – Bidunga	4 – Tied	Baha Mar Resort; Baha Mar, Nassau
October 21, 2026*; 7:00 p.m., ESPNU	No. 11	at No. 17 Kansas	W 89–83	–	23 – Shelstad	8 – Ekezie Jr.	4 – Tied	Allen Fieldhouse (15,300); Lawrence, KS
October 28, 2026*; 7:00 p.m., ACCNX	No. 11	Mercyhurst	W 71–39	–	19 – Bidunga	9 – Bidunga	6 – Trimble	KFC Yum! Center (12,545); Louisville, KY
Regular Season
November 2, 2026*; 9:00 p.m., ACCN	No. 11	Chattanooga	W 84–70	1–0	16 – Bidunga	11 – Knox	5 – Trimble	KFC Yum! Center (13,017); Louisville, KY
November 7, 2026*; 12:00 p.m., ACCNX	No. 11	Morehead State	W 107–57	2–0	20 – Ekezie Jr.	13 – Ekezie Jr.	6 – Folgueiras	KFC Yum! Center (13,188); Louisville, KY
November 15, 2026*; 1:00 p.m., ESPN	No. 10	at Memphis	L 78–98	2–1	16 – Tied	9 – Bidunga	4 – Wooley	FedEx Forum (12,516); Memphis, TN
November 19, 2026*; 8:00 p.m., ACCN	No. 23	Stetson	W 83–69	3–1	25 – Bidunga	12 – Bidunga	3 – Tied	KFC Yum! Center (12,706); Louisville, KY
November 24, 2026*; 8:00 p.m., ESPN		vs. Texas Tech; Players Era 16 Bracket 1 First Round						Michelob Ultra Arena; Las Vegas, NV
November 26, 2026*; TBD, TBD		vs. Oregon or St. John's; Players Era 16						Michelob Ultra Arena; Las Vegas, NV
November 27, 2026*; TBD, TBD		vs. TBD; Players Era 16						Michelob Ultra Arena; Las Vegas, NV
December 1, 2026*; 9:00 p.m., ESPN2		Texas; ACC–SEC Challenge						KFC Yum! Center; Louisville, KY
December 5, 2026*; 12:00 p.m., NBCSN/Peacock		vs. Michigan						Little Caesars Arena; Detroit, MI
December 12, 2026*; 4:00 p.m., ABC		at Kentucky; Rivalry						Rupp Arena; Lexington, KY
December 16, 2026*; 9:00 p.m., ACCN		LIU						KFC Yum! Center; Louisville, KY
December 19, 2026*; 1:30 p.m., The CW		Eastern Michigan						KFC Yum! Center; Louisville, KY
December 30, 2026; 8:00 p.m., The CW		at Virginia Tech						Cassell Coliseum; Blacksburg, VA
January 2, 2027; 6:00 p.m., ACCN		Stanford						KFC Yum! Center; Louisville, KY
January 5, 2027; 9:00 p.m., ESPN/ESPNU		North Carolina						KFC Yum! Center; Louisville, KY
January 9, 2027; 2:15 p.m., The CW		at SMU						Moody Coliseum; Dallas, TX
January 13, 2027; 7:00 p.m., ACCN		California						KFC Yum! Center; Louisville, KY
January 16, 2027; 2:00 p.m., ESPN/ESPN2/ESPNU		at Syracuse						JMA Wireless Dome; Syracuse, NY
January 19, 2027; 7:00 p.m., ESPN/ESPN2/ESPNU		Miami (FL)						KFC Yum! Center; Louisville, KY
January 23, 2027*; TBD, ESPN/ESPN2/ESPNU		vs. Baylor						Hinkle Fieldhouse; Indianapolis, IN
January 27, 2027; 7:00 p.m., ACCN		at Boston College						Conte Forum; Chestnut Hill, MA
January 30, 2027; 12:00 p.m., ESPN/ESPN2		at Georgia Tech						McCamish Pavilion; Atlanta, GA
February 2, 2027; 9:00 p.m., ESPN/ESPN2		Pittsburgh						KFC Yum! Center; Louisville, KY
February 6, 2027; 3:00 p.m., ACCN		Wake Forest						KFC Yum! Center; Louisville, KY
February 8, 2027; 6:00 p.m., ESPN		at North Carolina						Dean E. Smith Center; Chapel Hill, NC
February 13, 2027; 12:00 p.m., ESPN/ESPN2		SMU						KFC Yum! Center; Louisville, KY
February 15, 2027; 7:00 p.m., ESPN		at Virginia						John Paul Jones Arena; Charlottesville, VA
February 21, 2027; 4:00 p.m., ESPN/ESPN2		at Florida State						JMA Wireless Dome; Tallahassee, FL
February 24, 2027; 7:00 p.m., ESPN		Duke						KFC Yum! Center; Louisville, KY
March 2, 2027; 7:00 p.m., ESPN/ESPN2/ESPNU/ACCN		at NC State						Lenovo Center; Raleigh, NC
March 6, 2027; 12:00 p.m., ESPN/ESPNU		Clemson						KFC Yum! Center; Louisville, KY
*Non-conference game. ^{#}Rankings from AP Poll. (#) Tournament seedings in parentheses. All times are in Eastern Time.

Schedule Source:

== Rankings ==
Ranking movements Legend: ██ Increase in ranking ██ Decrease in ranking
	Week																				
Poll	Pre	1	2	3	4	5	6	7	8	9	10	11	12	13	14	15	16	17	18	19	Final
AP	11	10	23																		
Coaches	11	10	18																		
