= 2026–27 NC State Wolfpack men's basketball team =

American college basketball season

2026–27 NC State Wolfpack men's basketball
- Conference: Atlantic Coast Conference
- Record: 5–0 (0–0 ACC)
- Head coach: Justin Gainey (1st season)
- Assistant coaches: Alvin Brooks III (1st season); Riley Collins (1st season); Matthew Driscoll (1st season); Anthony Goins (1st season); Ognjen Vasiljević (1st season)
- Home arena: Lenovo Center

2026–27 ACC men's basketball standings
	Conf.				Overall
Team	W		L	PCT	W		L	PCT
No. 4 Virginia	0	–	0	–	7	–	0	1.000
Pittsburgh	0	–	0	–	6	–	0	1.000
SMU	0	–	0	–	6	–	0	1.000
Virginia Tech	0	–	0	–	6	–	0	1.000
Boston College	0	–	0	–	5	–	0	1.000
Notre Dame	0	–	0	–	6	–	1	.857
Florida State	0	–	0	–	5	–	1	.833
Georgia Tech	0	–	0	–	5	–	1	.833
No. 17 Miami (FL)	0	–	0	–	5	–	1	.833
NC State	0	–	0	–	5	–	1	.833
Stanford	0	–	0	–	5	–	1	.833
Clemson	0	–	0	–	4	–	1	.800
North Carolina	0	–	0	–	4	–	1	.800
Wake Forest	0	–	0	–	4	–	1	.800
No. 23 Louisville	0	–	0	–	3	–	1	.750
California	0	–	0	–	4	–	2	.667
No. 5 Duke	0	–	0	–	3	–	2	.600
Syracuse	0	–	0	–	3	–	2	.600
† 2027 ACC tournament winner As of November 21, 2026; Rankings from AP poll

The 2026–27 NC State Wolfpack men's basketball team represents North Carolina State University during the 2026–27 NCAA Division I men's basketball season. The Wolfpack are led by first-year head coach Justin Gainey and play their home games at Lenovo Center in Raleigh, North Carolina as members of the Atlantic Coast Conference (ACC).

Gainey, a former Wolfpack point guard from 1996 to 2000, was hired on April 1, 2026, from Tennessee, where he had been associate head coach under Rick Barnes. He replaced Will Wade, who left after one season to return to LSU. Gainey rebuilt the roster largely through the transfer portal; Paul McNeil Jr., Ven-Allen Lubin and Zymicah Wilkins were the only returning players, and Lubin won a court case granting him a fifth year of eligibility. The Wolfpack were picked to finish eighth in the ACC's preseason media poll.

NC State won both of its exhibition games, defeating Mississippi State 77–73 in Greensboro and Lenoir–Rhyne 130–66. Gainey won his debut 83–64 over Campbell, in which Lubin recorded 20 points and 10 rebounds. The Wolfpack then defeated East Tennessee State 77–63 behind 20 points and 10 assists from Preston Edmead.

== Previous season ==
The Wolfpack finished the 2025–26 season 20–14 overall and 10–8 in ACC play to finish in a tie for seventh place. As the seventh seed in the 2026 ACC tournament, they defeated Pittsburgh in the Second Round before losing to Virginia in the Quarterfinals. They received an at-large bid to the NCAA tournament as an eleven seed and lost to Texas in the First Four.

== Offseason ==
=== Coaching changes ===
On March 26, 2026, head coach Will Wade left NC State after one season to return to LSU. On April 1, NC State hired Tennessee associate head coach Justin Gainey, a former Wolfpack player, as the 22nd head coach in program history. Gainey hired Alvin Brooks III, Riley Collins, Matthew Driscoll and Anthony Goins as assistant coaches in April, and added former South Alabama assistant Ognjen Vasiljević in May.

=== Departures ===
NC State Departures
Name	Number	Pos.	Height	Weight	Year	Hometown	Reason for Departure
Jordan Snell	0	G	6'3"	195	Senior	Cary, North Carolina	Graduated
Darrion Williams	1	F	6'6"	225	Senior	Sacramento, California	Transferred to Texas Tech
Matt Able	3	G	6'6"	205	Freshman	Baltimore, Maryland	Transferred to North Carolina
Tre Holloman	5	G	6'2"	195	Senior	Minneapolis, Minnesota	Graduated
Alyn Breed	7	G	6'3"	200	(redshirt) Senior	Powder Springs, Georgia	Entered transfer portal
Jayme Kontuniemi	10	G	6'4"	215	Freshman	Helsinki, Finland	Transferred to Troy
Quadir Copeland	11	G	6'6"	220	Senior	Philadelphia, Pennsylvania	Graduated
Scottie Ebube	12	C	6'10"	280	Senior	Mundelein, Illinois	Graduated
Musa Sagnia	13	F	6'10"	235	Freshman	Bakau, The Gambia	Transferred to Virginia Tech
Jerry Deng	15	F	6'9"	230	Junior	Rochester, New York	Transferred to Memphis
Terrance Arceneaux	21	G	6'6"	205	(redshirt) Junior	Beaumont, Texas	Transferred to George Washington
Colt Langdon	45	F	6'7"	230	(redshirt) Freshman	Raleigh, North Carolina	Transferred to Marshall

=== Incoming transfers ===
NC State incoming transfers
Name	Number	Pos.	Height	Weight	Year	Hometown	Previous School
Preston Edmead	0	G	6'1"	180	Sophomore	Deer Park, New York	Hofstra
Christian Hammond	1	G	6'4"	205	Senior	Denver, Colorado	Santa Clara
Eemeli Yalaho	3	F	6'8"	235	Senior	Jyväskylä, Finland	Washington State
R. J. Keene II	5	G	6'7"	215	Graduate Student	The Woodlands, Texas	Boise State
Jacari Brim	6	G	6'2"	200	Sophomore	Winston-Salem, North Carolina	Appalachian State
Comeh Emuobor	10	F	6'5"	210	Senior	Raleigh, North Carolina	New Hampshire
Darius Adams	11	G	6'5"	190	Sophomore	Manchester, New Jersey	Maryland
Kyle Evans	14	F	6'10"	225	Graduate Student	Aliso Viejo, California	UC Irvine
Shah Hall	21	F	6'11"	235	Senior	Tuscaloosa, Alabama	Shelton State

=== 2026 Recruiting class ===
Cole Cloer, a four-star forward who signed with NC State under Wade and enrolled early, entered the transfer portal after the coaching change and moved on to Alabama.

College recruiting
Name	Hometown	School	Height	Weight	Commit date
Kingston Whitty; PG	Mableton, Georgia	Christ School	6 ft 2 in (1.88 m)	185 lb (84 kg)	Apr 29, 2026
Kingston Whitty; PG	Recruit ratings: Rivals: 247Sports: ESPN: (81)				
Robert Jurković; F	Ljubljana, Slovenia	Ilirija	6 ft 10 in (2.08 m)	235 lb (107 kg)	May 25, 2026
Robert Jurković; F	Recruit ratings: Scout: Rivals: 247Sports: ESPN: (NR)				
Overall recruit ranking: 247Sports: 63
Note: In many cases, Scout, Rivals, 247Sports, On3, and ESPN may conflict in their listings of height and weight.; In these cases, the average was taken. ESPN grades are on a 100-point scale.; Sources: "2026 NC State Commits". Rivals.; "NC State Wolfpack". ESPN.; "2026 Team Ranking". Rivals.

2026 overall class rankings

Website	National rank	Conference rank	5-star recruits	4-star recruits	Total
247 Sports	63		0	1	2
ESPN			0	1	1

== Roster ==
2026–27 NC State Wolfpack men's basketball team
Players
Coaches

Pos.	#	Name	Height	Weight	Year	Previous school	Hometown
G	0	Preston Edmead	6 ft 1 in (1.85 m)	180 lb (82 kg)	So	Williston Northampton; Hofstra	Deer Park, NY
G	1	Christian Hammond	6 ft 4 in (1.93 m)	205 lb (93 kg)	Sr	Dream City Christian; Santa Clara	Denver, CO
G	2	Paul McNeil	6 ft 6 in (1.98 m)	190 lb (86 kg)	Jr	Richmond Senior	Rockingham, NC
F	3	Eemeli Yalaho	6 ft 8 in (2.03 m)	235 lb (107 kg)	Sr	Western Reserve Academy; Washington State	Jyväskylä, Finland
G	4	Kingston Whitty	6 ft 2 in (1.88 m)	185 lb (84 kg)	Fr	Christ School	Mableton, GA
G	5	R.J. Keene II	6 ft 7 in (2.01 m)	215 lb (98 kg)	GS	Concordia Lutheran; Boise State	The Woodlands, TX
G	6	Jacari Brim	6 ft 2 in (1.88 m)	200 lb (91 kg)	So	West Forsyth; Appalachian State	Winston-Salem, NC
F	10	Comeh Emuobor	6 ft 5 in (1.96 m)	210 lb (95 kg)	Sr	Brewster Academy; New Hampshire	Raleigh, NC
G	11	Darius Adams	6 ft 5 in (1.96 m)	190 lb (86 kg)	So	La Lumiere; Maryland	Manchester, NJ
F	13	Robert Jurković	6 ft 10 in (2.08 m)	235 lb (107 kg)	Sr	Ilirija	Ljubljana, Slovenia
F	14	Kyle Evans	6 ft 10 in (2.08 m)	225 lb (102 kg)	GS	Santa Margarita Catholic; UC Irvine	Aliso Viejo, CA
F	21	Shah Hall	6 ft 11 in (2.11 m)	235 lb (107 kg)	Sr	Hillcrest; Shelton State	Tuscaloosa, AL
F	22	Ven-Allen Lubin	6 ft 9 in (2.06 m)	235 lb (107 kg)	GS	Orlando Christian; North Carolina	Orlando, FL
F	33	Zymicah Wilkins	6 ft 9 in (2.06 m)	265 lb (120 kg)	So	Christ School	Rutherfordton, NC

Head coach

- Justin Gainey (NC State)

Assistant coach(es)

- Alvin Brooks III
- Riley Collins
- Matthew Driscoll
- Anthony Goins
- Ognjen Vasiljević

Legend

- (C) Team captain
- (S) Suspended
- (I) Ineligible
- (W) Walk-on
- Injured
- Current redshirt

Roster

== Schedule and results ==
Date time, TV	Rank^{#}	Opponent^{#}	Result	Record	High points	High rebounds	High assists	Site (attendance) city, state
Exhibition
October 18, 2026*; 4:00 p.m.		vs. Mississippi State	W 77–73	–	16 – Tied	6 – Adams	5 – Adams	First Horizon Coliseum (1,301); Greensboro, NC
October 24, 2026*; 12:00 p.m.		Lenoir–Rhyne	W 130–66	–	23 – McNeil Jr.	9 – Lubin	9 – Adams	Lenovo Center (1,347); Raleigh, NC
Non-conference regular season
November 2, 2026*; 7:30 p.m., ACCNX		Campbell	W 83–64	1–0	20 – Lubin	10 – Lubin	6 – Hammond	Lenovo Center (17,488); Raleigh, NC
November 6, 2026*; 7:00 p.m., ACCNX		East Tennessee State	W 77–63	2–0	20 – Edmead	6 – Evans	10 – Edmead	Lenovo Center (15,413); Raleigh, NC
November 10, 2026*; 7:00 p.m., ACCNX		Presbyterian	W 94–60	3–0	21 – Lubin	12 – McNeil Jr.	6 – Edmead	Lenovo Center (11,764); Raleigh, NC
November 13, 2026*; 7:00 p.m., ACCN		Troy	W 81–62	4–0	16 – McNeil Jr.	12 – Lubin	7 – Edmead	Lenovo Center (14,879); Raleigh, NC
November 19, 2026*; 6:00 p.m., CBSSN		vs. Murray State; Bahamas Championship Semifinal	W 93–83	5–0	33 – McNeil Jr.	7 – Evans	8 – McNeil Jr.	Baha Mar Convention Center (1,277); Nassau, Bahamas
November 20, 2026*; 9:30 p.m., CBSSN		vs. Seton Hall; Bahamas Championship Game	L 81–87 ^{OT}	5–1	27 – Lubin	8 – Lubin	6 – Adams	Baha Mar Convention Center (1,247); Nassau, Bahamas
November 25, 2026*; 7:00 p.m., ACCNX		Norfolk State						Lenovo Center; Raleigh, NC
November 28, 2026*; 12:00 p.m., ACCNX		Elon						Lenovo Center; Raleigh, NC
December 1, 2026*; 7:00 p.m., ACCN		South Carolina; ACC–SEC Challenge						Lenovo Center; Raleigh, NC
December 6, 2026*; 7:00 p.m., ESPN		vs. Tennessee; Bad Boy Mowers Series						Bridgestone Arena; Nashville, TN
December 11, 2026*; 7:00 p.m., ACCN		UNC Greensboro						Reynolds Coliseum; Raleigh, NC
December 15, 2026*; 7:00 p.m., ESPN2		vs. North Carolina; Rivalry / Tobacco Road Classic						First Horizon Coliseum; Greensboro, NC
December 19, 2026*; 7:00 p.m., ESPNU		vs. Ole Miss						Mississippi Coliseum; Jackson, MS
December 22, 2026*; 1:00 p.m., ACCNX		Alabama A&M						Lenovo Center; Raleigh, NC
ACC regular season
December 29, 2026; 8:00 p.m., ACCN		at Miami (FL)						Watsco Center; Coral Gables, FL
January 2, 2027; 1:00 p.m., ACCN		Clemson						Lenovo Center; Raleigh, NC
January 6, 2027; 7:00 p.m.		Pittsburgh						Lenovo Center; Raleigh, NC
January 9, 2027; 12:00 p.m., ESPN2		at North Carolina; Rivalry						Dean Smith Center; Chapel Hill, NC
January 12, 2027; 9:00 p.m., ACCN		SMU						Lenovo Center; Raleigh, NC
January 19, 2027; 9:00 p.m., ACCN		at Georgia Tech						McCamish Pavilion; Atlanta, GA
January 23, 2027; 12:00 p.m., The CW		Wake Forest; Rivalry						Lenovo Center; Raleigh, NC
January 27, 2027; 9:00 p.m., ACCN		at California						Haas Pavilion; Berkeley, CA
January 30, 2027; 8:00 p.m., ACCN		at Stanford						Maples Pavilion; Stanford, CA
February 3, 2027; 6:00 p.m.		Florida State						Lenovo Center; Raleigh, NC
February 10, 2027; 7:00 p.m., ACCN		at Wake Forest; Rivalry						Lawrence Joel Veterans Memorial Coliseum; Winston-Salem, NC
February 13, 2027; 1:00 p.m., The CW		Boston College						Lenovo Center; Raleigh, NC
February 17, 2027; 7:00 p.m.		at Virginia Tech						Cassell Coliseum; Blacksburg, VA
February 20, 2027; 12:00 p.m., The CW		California						Lenovo Center; Raleigh, NC
February 24, 2027; 7:00 p.m., ACCN		Notre Dame						Lenovo Center; Raleigh, NC
February 27, 2027; 12:00 p.m., ESPN		at Duke; Rivalry						Cameron Indoor Stadium; Durham, NC
March 2, 2027; 7:00 p.m.		Louisville						Lenovo Center; Raleigh, NC
March 6, 2027; 12:00 p.m., The CW		at Virginia						John Paul Jones Arena; Charlottesville, VA
ACC Tournament
March 9–13, 2027; TBA		vs. TBD						First Horizon Coliseum; Greensboro, NC
*Non-conference game. ^{#}Rankings from AP poll. (#) Tournament seedings in parentheses. All times are in Eastern Time.

== Rankings ==
Ranking movements Legend: — = Not ranked
	Week																				
Poll	Pre	1	2	3	4	5	6	7	8	9	10	11	12	13	14	15	16	17	18	19	Final
AP	—	—	—																		
Coaches	—	—	—																		
