= 2025–26 Miami Hurricanes men's basketball team =

American college basketball season

2025–26 Miami Hurricanes men's basketball

NCAA tournament, Second round
- Conference: Atlantic Coast Conference

Ranking
- Coaches: No. 22
- AP: No. 24
- Record: 26–9 (13–5 ACC)
- Head coach: Jai Lucas (1st season)
- Associate head coach: Erik Pastrana; Charlton Young (1st season)
- Assistant coaches: Andrew Moran (1st season); Russell Springmann (1st season)
- Home arena: Watsco Center

2025–26 ACC men's basketball standings
	Conf.				Overall
Team	W		L	PCT	W		L	PCT
No. 4 Duke †	17	–	1	.944	35	–	3	.921
No. 17 Virginia	15	–	3	.833	30	–	6	.833
No. 24 Miami (FL)	13	–	5	.722	26	–	9	.743
North Carolina	12	–	6	.667	24	–	9	.727
Clemson	12	–	6	.667	24	–	11	.686
No. 23 Louisville	11	–	7	.611	24	–	11	.686
NC State	10	–	8	.556	20	–	14	.588
Florida State	10	–	8	.556	18	–	15	.545
California	9	–	9	.500	22	–	12	.647
Stanford	9	–	9	.500	20	–	13	.606
SMU	8	–	10	.444	20	–	14	.588
Virginia Tech	8	–	10	.444	19	–	13	.594
Wake Forest	7	–	11	.389	18	–	17	.514
Syracuse	6	–	12	.333	15	–	17	.469
Pittsburgh	5	–	13	.278	13	–	20	.394
Notre Dame	4	–	14	.222	13	–	18	.419
Boston College	4	–	14	.222	11	–	20	.355
Georgia Tech	2	–	16	.111	11	–	20	.355
† 2026 ACC tournament winner Rankings from AP Poll

The 2025–26 Miami Hurricanes men's basketball team represented the University of Miami during the 2025–26 NCAA Division I men's basketball season. The Hurricanes were led by first-year head coach Jai Lucas, and played their home games at the Watsco Center on the university's campus in Coral Gables, Florida as members of the Atlantic Coast Conference (ACC). Lucas entered his first season after longtime head coach Jim Larrañaga announced his retirement during the previous season. Bill Courtney was named the interim head coach for the remainder of the season and was not retained in the offseason.

The Hurricanes started the season with three straight wins before facing their first Power-4 opponent in rivals Florida. Florida was ranked tenth at the time of their meeting in the Jacksonville Hoops Showdown, which the Hurricanes lost 68–82. They won two more games before traveling to Kissimmee, Florida to participate in the ESPN Events Invitational. The team lost the opening game of the tournament against ninth-ranked BYU before winning the third-place game against Georgetown. The Hurricanes won their remaining five non-conference games, with their victory at Ole Miss in the ACC–SEC Challenge being their only further Power-4 opponent. They began ACC play on a 4–0 winning streak, defeating Pittsburgh and Georgia Tech at home and Wake Forest and Notre Dame on the road. The team experienced a rough patch after that, going 2–3 in their next five games. They lost games against twenty-second ranked Clemson, rivals Florida State and California over the stretch. The Hurricanes went 4–1 over their next five games, with their only loss being a three-point defeat at Virginia. The run included an upset of eleventh-ranked North Carolina. They won their next two games, including a rivalry re-match against Florida State, and entered the AP poll at number 22. They went 1–1 as a ranked team, defeating SMU and losing to Louisville by three on the final day of the season.

The Hurricanes finished the season 26–9 overall and 13–5 in ACC play to finish in third place. As the third seed in the 2026 ACC tournament, they earned a double-bye into the quarterfinals, where they were defeated by Louisville, who was the sixth seed, and ranked twenty-fourth in a rematch of their final regular season game. They lost in the semifinals to second seed and tenth-ranked Virginia. The team earned an at-large bid to the NCAA tournament and were the seven-seed in the West region. They were ranked twenty-fifth in the AP Poll released prior to the tournament. They defeated ten-seed Missouri in the first round, before losing by ten points to second seed and eighth-ranked Purdue to end their season.

== Previous season ==
The Hurricanes finished the season 7–24 and 3–17 in ACC play to finish in eighteenth place. Under the new ACC tournament rules, they did not qualify for the 2025 ACC tournament. They were not invited to the NCAA tournament or the NIT.

== Offseason ==
=== Departures ===
Departures
Name	Number	Pos.	Height	Weight	Year	Hometown	Reason for departure
Matthew Cleveland	0	G	6'7"	210	Senior	Atlanta, Georgia	Graduated
Lynn Kidd	1	C	6'10"	241	Graduate student	Gainesville, Florida	Graduated
Brandon Johnson	2	F	6'8"	223	Senior	Raleigh, North Carolina	Graduated
Jalil Bethea	3	G	6'5"	190	Freshman	Philadelphia, Pennsylvania	Transferred to Alabama
Isaiah Johnson-Arigu	4	F	6'7"	200	Freshman	Minneapolis, Minnesota	Transferred to Iowa
Jalen Blackmon	5	G	6'2"	180	Senior	Marion, Indiana	Graduated
Xander Alarie	8	F	6'8"	195	Freshman	Potomac, Maryland	Transferred to Northeastern
Paul Djobet	10	G	6'7"	209	Sophomore	Lille, France	Transferred to UAB
A.J. Staton-McCray	11	G	6'4"	196	(redshirt) Junior	Delray Beach, Florida	Transferred to Seton Hall
Kiree Huie	15	F	6'9"	228	Senior	Grayson, Georgia	Transferred to Eastern Washington
Austin Swartz	23	G	6'4"	200	Freshman	Concord, North Carolina	Transferred to Creighton
Nijel Pack	24	G	6'0"	185	Graduate student	Indianapolis, Indiana	Transferred to Oklahoma
Yussif Basa-Ama	35	F	6'9"	213	Graduate student	Bolgatanga, Ghana	Graduated
Divine Ugochukwu	99	G	6'3"	190	Freshman	Sugar Land, Texas	Transferred to Michigan State

=== Incoming transfers ===
Incoming transfers
Name	Number	Pos.	Height	Weight	Year	Hometown	Previous school
Jordyn Kee	1	G	6'3"	183	(redshirt) Freshman	Broward County, Florida	Georgia
Tre Donaldson	3	G	6'3"	198	Senior	Tallahassee, Florida	Michigan
Marcus Allen	4	G/F	6'7"	231	Sophomore	Miami, Florida	Missouri
Malik Reneau	5	F	6'9"	238	Senior	Miami, Florida	Indiana
Ernest Udeh Jr.	8	C	6'11"	266	Senior	Orlando, Florida	TCU
Tru Washington	10	G	6'4"	204	Junior	Phoenix, Arizona	New Mexico

=== 2025 recruiting class ===
College recruiting
Name	Hometown	School	Height	Weight	Commit date
Dante Allen; G	Miami, Florida	Montverde Academy	6 ft 4 in (1.93 m)	220 lb (100 kg)	Apr 14, 2025
Dante Allen; G	Recruit ratings: Scout: Rivals: 247Sports: ESPN: (86)				
Salih Altuntas; F	Istanbul, Turkey	Istanbul Anka Sport	6 ft 10 in (2.08 m)	274 lb (124 kg)	May 22, 2025
Salih Altuntas; F	Recruit ratings: Scout: Rivals: 247Sports: ESPN: (NR)				
Shelton Henderson; F	Bellaire, Texas	Bellaire	6 ft 6 in (1.98 m)	240 lb (110 kg)	Apr 21, 2025
Shelton Henderson; F	Recruit ratings: Scout: Rivals: 247Sports: ESPN: (88)				
John Laboy II; G	Houston, Texas	St. Francis Episcopal	6 ft 3 in (1.91 m)	194 lb (88 kg)	May 30, 2025
John Laboy II; G	Recruit ratings: Scout: Rivals: 247Sports: ESPN: (NR)				
Treyvon Maddox; F	Orlando, Florida	Oak Ridge	6 ft 6 in (1.98 m)	180 lb (82 kg)	Jul 6, 2025
Treyvon Maddox; F	Recruit ratings: Scout: Rivals: 247Sports: ESPN: (82)				
Timo Malovec; F	Ivanka pri Dunaji, Slovakia	KK Mega Basket	6 ft 8 in (2.03 m)	214 lb (97 kg)	Apr 16, 2025
Timo Malovec; F	Recruit ratings: Scout: Rivals: 247Sports: ESPN: (NR)				
Overall recruit ranking: Scout: 16 Rivals: 21 ESPN: 23
Note: In many cases, Scout, Rivals, 247Sports, On3, and ESPN may conflict in their listings of height and weight.; In these cases, the average was taken. ESPN grades are on a 100-point scale.; Sources: "Miami 2025 Basketball Commitments". Rivals.; "Miami 2025 Basketball Commits". Scout.; "Miami Hurricanes". ESPN.; "Scout.com Team Recruiting Rankings". Scout.; "2025 Team Ranking". Rivals.

== Roster ==
2025–26 Miami Hurricanes men's basketball team
Players
Coaches

Pos.	#	Name	Height	Weight	Year	Previous school	Hometown
G	1	Jordyn Kee	6 ft 3 in (1.91 m)	183 lb (83 kg)	RS Fr	Sagemont Prep; Georgia	Broward County, FL
G	3	Tre Donaldson	6 ft 3 in (1.91 m)	198 lb (90 kg)	Sr	Florida State High; Michigan	Tallahassee, FL
G/F	4	Marcus Allen	6 ft 7 in (2.01 m)	231 lb (105 kg)	So	Miami Norland; Missouri	Miami, FL
F	5	Malik Reneau	6 ft 9 in (2.06 m)	238 lb (108 kg)	Sr	Montverde Academy; Indiana	Miami, FL
F	6	Treyvon Maddox	6 ft 6 in (1.98 m)	180 lb (82 kg)	Fr	Oak Ridge	Orlando, FL
F	7	Shelton Henderson	6 ft 6 in (1.98 m)	240 lb (109 kg)	Fr	Bellaire	Bellaire, TX
C	8	Ernest Udeh Jr.	6 ft 11 in (2.11 m)	266 lb (121 kg)	Sr	Dr. Phillips; TCU	Orlando, FL
G	10	Tru Washington	6 ft 4 in (1.93 m)	204 lb (93 kg)	Jr	AZ Compass Prep; New Mexico	Phoenix, AZ
F	11	Salih Altuntas	6 ft 10 in (2.08 m)	274 lb (124 kg)	Fr	Istanbul Anka Sport	Istanbul, Turkey
G	12	John Laboy II	6 ft 3 in (1.91 m)	194 lb (88 kg)	Fr	St. Francis Episcopal	Houston, TX
G	14	Noam Dovrat	6 ft 5 in (1.96 m)	213 lb (97 kg)	Jr	Hapoel Jerusalem	Rishon LeZion, Israel
G	35	Dante Allen	6 ft 4 in (1.93 m)	220 lb (100 kg)	Fr	Montverde Academy	Miami, FL
F	88	Timo Malovec	6 ft 8 in (2.03 m)	214 lb (97 kg)	Fr	KK Mega Basket	Ivanka pri Dunaji, Slovakia

Head coach

- Jai Lucas (Texas)

Assistant coach(es)

- Erik Pastrana (Florida State)
- Charlton Young (Georgia Southern)
- Andrew Moran (Florida State)
- Russell Springmann (Salisbury)

Legend

- (C) Team captain
- (S) Suspended
- (I) Ineligible
- (W) Walk-on
- Injured
- Current redshirt

Roster
Last update: November 1, 2025

== Schedule and results ==
Date time, TV	Rank^{#}	Opponent^{#}	Result	Record	High points	High rebounds	High assists	Site (attendance) city, state
Non-conference regular season
November 3, 2025*; 8:00 p.m., ACCNX		Jacksonville	W 86–69	1–0	20 – Reneau	14 – Udeh Jr.	4 – Tied	Watsco Center (5,633); Coral Gables, FL
November 6, 2025*; 7:00 p.m., ACCNX		Bethune–Cookman	W 101–61	2–0	23 – Donaldson	10 – Udeh Jr.	5 – Reneau	Watsco Center (4,508); Coral Gables, FL
November 10, 2025*; 7:00 p.m., ACCN		Stetson	W 102–61	3–0	22 – Reneau	10 – Reneau	10 – Donaldson	Watsco Center (4,105); Coral Gables, FL
November 16, 2025*; 8:30 p.m., ESPN		vs. No. 10 Florida; Jacksonville Hoops Showdown	L 68–82	3–1	22 – Reneau	11 – Reneau	6 – Donaldson	VyStar Veterans Memorial Arena (8,321); Jacksonville, FL
November 20, 2025*; 7:00 p.m., ACCNX		Elon	W 99–72	4–1	19 – Reneau	10 – Washington	5 – Donaldson	Watsco Center (4,131); Coral Gables, FL
November 23, 2025*; 1:00 p.m., ACCNX		Delaware State	W 97–41	5–1	24 – Reneau	11 – Altuntas	6 – Donaldson	Watsco Center (4,126); Coral Gables, FL
November 27, 2025*; 5:00 p.m., ESPN		vs. No. 9 BYU; ESPN Events Invitational Magic Bracket Semifinal	L 62–72	5–2	14 – Reneau	9 – Reneau	4 – Henderson	State Farm Field House (4,267); Kissimmee, FL
November 28, 2025*; 7:00 p.m., ESPN2		vs. Georgetown; ESPN Events Invitational Magic Bracket Third Place	W 78–65	6–2	23 – Reneau	11 – Udeh Jr.	6 – Donaldson	State Farm Field House (4,135); Kissimmee, FL
December 2, 2025*; 9:00 p.m., SECN		at Ole Miss; ACC–SEC Challenge	W 75–66	7–2	18 – Henderson	9 – Henderson	5 – Henderson	SJB Pavilion (9,373); Oxford, MS
December 6, 2025*; 12:00 p.m., ACCN		Southern Miss	W 88–64	8–2	21 – Reneau	10 – Udeh Jr.	11 – Donaldson	Watsco Center (3,907); Coral Gables, FL
December 13, 2025*; 12:00 p.m., ACCNX		Louisiana–Monroe	W 104–79	9–2	22 – Reneau	15 – Udeh Jr.	11 – Donaldson	Watsco Center (3,751); Coral Gables, FL
December 16, 2025*; 7:00 p.m., ACCNX		FIU	W 98–81	10–2	30 – Henderson	8 – Udeh Jr.	12 – Donaldson	Watsco Center (4,930); Coral Gables, FL
December 21, 2025*; 4:00 p.m., ACCNX		North Florida	W 105–67	11–2	21 – Donaldson	14 – Udeh Jr.	9 – Donaldson	Watsco Center (3,862); Coral Gables, FL
ACC regular season
December 30, 2025; 7:00 p.m., ACCN		Pittsburgh	W 76–69	12–2 (1–0)	28 – Reneau	11 – Udeh Jr.	3 – Donaldson	Watsco Center (4,832); Coral Gables, FL
January 7, 2026; 7:00 p.m., ESPNU		at Wake Forest	W 81–77	13–2 (2–0)	21 – Donaldson	13 – Udeh Jr.	6 – Donaldson	LJVM Coliseum (7,869); Winston-Salem, NC
January 10, 2026; 2:00 p.m., ACCN		Georgia Tech	W 91–81	14–2 (3–0)	27 – Donaldson	15 – Udeh Jr.	10 – Donaldson	Watsco Center (5,328); Coral Gables, FL
January 13, 2026; 7:00 p.m., ESPNU		at Notre Dame	W 81–69	15–2 (4–0)	23 – Donaldson	10 – Reneau	5 – Donaldson	Joyce Center (5,278); South Bend, IN
January 17, 2026; 2:15 p.m., The CW		at No. 22 Clemson	L 59–69	15–3 (4–1)	22 – Henderson	17 – Udeh Jr.	3 – Henderson	Littlejohn Coliseum (9,000); Clemson, SC
January 20, 2026; 7:00 p.m., ESPNU		Florida State; Rivalry	L 63–65	15–4 (4–2)	18 – Henderson	9 – Udeh Jr.	5 – Donaldson	Watsco Center (5,664); Coral Gables, FL
January 24, 2026; 2:00 p.m., ACCN		at Syracuse	W 85–76	16–4 (5–2)	20 – Reneau	11 – Reneau	5 – Tied	JMA Wireless Dome (21,417); Syracuse, NY
January 28, 2026; 9:00 p.m., ACCN		Stanford	W 79–70	17–4 (6–2)	20 – Reneau	9 – Udeh Jr.	4 – Washington	Watsco Center (4,987); Coral Gables, FL
January 31, 2026; 4:00 p.m., ACCN		California	L 85–86	17–5 (6–3)	24 – Reneau	7 – Udeh Jr.	5 – Donaldson	Watsco Center (6,513); Coral Gables, FL
February 7, 2026; 2:00 p.m., ACCN		at Boston College	W 74–68	18–5 (7–3)	23 – Reneau	8 – Tied	7 – Donaldson	Conte Forum (6,133); Chestnut Hill, MA
February 10, 2026; 7:00 p.m., ESPN		No. 11 North Carolina	W 75–66	19–5 (8–3)	16 – Reneau	10 – Tied	5 – Donaldson	Watsco Center (7,355); Coral Gables, FL
February 14, 2026; 4:00 p.m., ESPN2		at NC State	W 77–76	20–5 (9–3)	26 – Reneau	9 – Henderson	4 – Donaldson	Lenovo Center (18,410); Raleigh, NC
February 17, 2026; 8:00 p.m., ACCN		Virginia Tech	W 67–66	21–5 (10–3)	32 – Donaldson	9 – Udeh Jr.	2 – Tied	Watsco Center (7,639); Coral Gables, FL
February 21, 2026; 2:00 p.m., ESPN2		at No. 14 Virginia	L 83–86	21–6 (10–4)	18 – Tied	9 – Udeh Jr.	7 – Donaldson	John Paul Jones Arena (14,637); Charlottesville, VA
February 24, 2026; 9:00 p.m., ACCN		at Florida State	W 83–73	22–6 (11–4)	23 – Reneau	12 – Reneau	6 – Donaldson	Donald L. Tucker Center (10,317); Tallahassee, FL
February 28, 2026; 2:00 p.m., ACCN		Boston College	W 76–54	23–6 (12–4)	15 – Donaldson	12 – Udeh Jr.	4 – Henderson	Watsco Center (6,040); Coral Gables, FL
March 4, 2026; 7:00 p.m., ACCN	No. 22	at SMU	W 77–69	24–6 (13–4)	17 – Donaldson	11 – Reneau	9 – Donaldson	Moody Coliseum (6,849); University Park, TX
March 7, 2026; 2:00 p.m., ESPNU	No. 22	Louisville	L 89–92	24–7 (13–5)	25 – Donaldson	8 – Udeh Jr.	6 – Donaldson	Watsco Center (7,972); Coral Gables, FL
ACC tournament
March 12, 2026; 2:30 p.m., ESPN2	(3)	vs. (6) No. 24 Louisville; Quarterfinal	W 78–73	25–7	24 – Reneau	9 – Udeh Jr.	6 – Donaldson	Spectrum Center (11,722); Charlotte, NC
March 13, 2026; 7:00 p.m., ESPN2	(3)	vs. (2) No. 10 Virginia; Semifinal	L 62–84	25–8	13 – Washington	6 – Reneau	2 – Tied	Spectrum Center (17,711); Charlotte, NC
NCAA tournament
March 20, 2026*; 10:10 p.m., truTV	(7 W) No. 25	vs. (10 W) Missouri; First round	W 80–66	26–8	24 – Reneau	10 – Udeh Jr.	6 – Donaldson	Enterprise Center (17,726); St. Louis, MO
March 22, 2026*; 12:10 p.m., CBS	(7 W) No. 25	vs. (2 W) No. 8 Purdue; Second round	L 69–79	26–9	18 – Henderson	8 – Henderson	4 – Tied	Enterprise Center (16,348); St. Louis, MO
*Non-conference game. ^{#}Rankings from AP poll. (#) Tournament seedings in parentheses. W=West. All times are in Eastern Time.

== Rankings ==
Ranking movements Legend: ██ Increase in ranking ██ Decrease in ranking — = Not ranked RV = Received votes
	Week																				
Poll	Pre	1	2	3	4	5	6	7	8	9	10	11	12	13	14	15	16	17	18	19	Final
AP	—	—	—	—	—	RV	RV	RV	RV*	RV	RV	RV	—	RV	—	RV	RV	22	RV	25	24
Coaches	—	—	—	—	—	RV	—	—	—	—	RV	RV	—	—	—	RV	RV	23	25	23	22

*AP did not release a week 8 poll.
