= 2025–26 Georgia Tech Yellow Jackets men's basketball team =

American college basketball season

2025–26 Georgia Tech Yellow Jackets men's basketball
- Conference: Atlantic Coast Conference
- Record: 11–20 (2–16 ACC)
- Head coach: Damon Stoudamire (3rd season)
- Associate head coach: Karl Hobbs (3rd season)
- Assistant coaches: B. J. Elder (2nd season); Pershin Williams (3rd season); Nate Babcock (2nd season); Bonzi Wells (2nd season)
- Home arena: McCamish Pavilion

2025–26 ACC men's basketball standings
	Conf.				Overall
Team	W		L	PCT	W		L	PCT
No. 4 Duke †	17	–	1	.944	35	–	3	.921
No. 17 Virginia	15	–	3	.833	30	–	6	.833
No. 24 Miami (FL)	13	–	5	.722	26	–	9	.743
North Carolina	12	–	6	.667	24	–	9	.727
Clemson	12	–	6	.667	24	–	11	.686
No. 23 Louisville	11	–	7	.611	24	–	11	.686
NC State	10	–	8	.556	20	–	14	.588
Florida State	10	–	8	.556	18	–	15	.545
California	9	–	9	.500	22	–	12	.647
Stanford	9	–	9	.500	20	–	13	.606
SMU	8	–	10	.444	20	–	14	.588
Virginia Tech	8	–	10	.444	19	–	13	.594
Wake Forest	7	–	11	.389	18	–	17	.514
Syracuse	6	–	12	.333	15	–	17	.469
Pittsburgh	5	–	13	.278	13	–	20	.394
Notre Dame	4	–	14	.222	13	–	18	.419
Boston College	4	–	14	.222	11	–	20	.355
Georgia Tech	2	–	16	.111	11	–	20	.355
† 2026 ACC tournament winner Rankings from AP Poll

The 2025–26 Georgia Tech Yellow Jackets men's basketball team represented the Georgia Institute of Technology during the 2025–26 NCAA Division I men's basketball season. They were led by third-year head coach Damon Stoudamire and played their home games at Hank McCamish Pavilion in Atlanta, Georgia as members of the Atlantic Coast Conference.

The Yellow Jackets began the season with three straight wins, including a season opening overtime victory over Maryland Eastern Shore. They then traveled to Athens to face Georgia in a rivalry game. The Yellow Jackets lost by five points for their first loss of the season. They won two more games before traveling to Niceville, Florida to participate in the Emerald Coast Classic. The Yellow Jackets lost both of their games in the competition, both by double-digits. They also lost their ACC–SEC Challenge game to Mississippi State by twelve points. They won their final four non-conference games, all by double-digits against non-Power 4 competition. The team began the ACC season 2–4, defeating Boston College and NC State. A notable loss over the stretch was their ACC opener against sixth-ranked Duke by six-points. Their victory over NC State on January 17, would be their last victory of the season. They finished the ACC season on a twelve-game losing streak. They lost to four ranked teams over the stretch; eighteenth-ranked Clemson, twenty-first ranked Louisville, sixteenth-ranked North Carolina, and fourteenth-ranked Virginia. The closest game was their final game of the season, where they lost by three-points at Clemson.

The Yellow Jackets finished the season 11–20 and 2–16 in ACC play to finish in eighteenth place. They did not qualify for the 2026 ACC tournament and were not invited to a post-season tournament. The day after their season ended, head coach Damon Stoudamire was fired, after three seasons as head coach.

== Previous season ==
The Yellow Jackets finished the season 17–17 and 10–10 in ACC play to finish in eighth place. As the eighth seed in the 2025 ACC tournament faced ninth-seed Virginia in the Second Round. They avenged a regular-season loss to the Cavaliers, and won the tournament game 66–60. They fell to top seed and top ranked Duke 78–70 in the Quarterfinals. They received an at-large bid to the NIT. The Yellow Jackets were a four-seed in the Irvine region. They lost their opening game to Jacksonville State 81–64 to end their season.

== Offseason ==
=== Departures ===
Departures
Name	Number	Pos.	Height	Weight	Year	Hometown	Reason for departure
Lance Terry	0	G	6'3"	200	Senior	College Park, Georgia	Graduated
Naithan George	1	G	6'3"	185	Sophomore	Toronto, Canada	Transferred to Syracuse
Javian McCollum	2	G	6'2"	175	Senior	Fort Myers, Florida	Graduated
Luke O'Brien	9	F	6'8"	225	Senior	Littleton, Colorado	Graduated
Darrion Sutton	10	F	6'8"	205	Freshman	St. Charles, Missouri	Transferred to Missouri State
Ryan Mutombo	12	C	7'2"	255	Senior	Atlanta, Georgia	Graduated
Ibrahim Souare	30	F	6'9"	225	(redshirt) Freshman	Conakry, Guinea	Transferred to Syracuse
Marcos San Miguel	33	G	6'4"	203	Sophomore	Atlanta, Georgia	Entered transfer portal
Emmer Nichols	35	F	6'6"	223	(redshirt) Sophomore	Woodside, California	Entered transfer portal
Doryan Onwuchekwa	45	C	6'11"	240	Freshman	DeSoto, Texas	Transferred to Tulsa

=== Incoming transfers ===
Incoming transfers
Name	Number	Pos.	Height	Weight	Year	Hometown	Previous school
Lamar Washington	1	G	6'4"	200	Senior	Portland, Oregon	Pacific
Peyton Marshall	5	C	7'0"	300	Sophomore	Atlanta, Georgia	Missouri
Chas Kelly III	7	G	6'3"	185	Senior	Houston, Texas	Boston College
Kam Craft	12	G/F	6'6"	205	(redshirt) Junior	Chicago, Illinois	Miami (OH)

=== 2025 recruiting class ===
College recruiting
Name	Hometown	School	Height	Weight	Commit date
Eric Chatfield, Jr. G	Atlanta, Georgia	Pace Academy	5 ft 11 in (1.80 m)	160 lb (73 kg)	Oct 17, 2024
Eric Chatfield, Jr. G	Recruit ratings: Scout: Rivals: 247Sports: ESPN: (NR)				
Akai Fleming; G	Marietta, Georgia	Overtime Elite	6 ft 4 in (1.93 m)	184 lb (83 kg)	Apr 12, 2024
Akai Fleming; G	Recruit ratings: Scout: Rivals: 247Sports: ESPN: (85)				
Cole Kirouac; C	Cumming, Georgia	Overtime Elite	7 ft 0 in (2.13 m)	199 lb (90 kg)	Sep 19, 2023
Cole Kirouac; C	Recruit ratings: Scout: Rivals: 247Sports: ESPN: (78)				
Davi Remagen; G	Cologne, Germany	RheinStars Köln	6 ft 3 in (1.91 m)	193 lb (88 kg)	Apr 28, 2025
Davi Remagen; G	Recruit ratings: Scout: Rivals: 247Sports: ESPN: (NR)				
Brandon Stores, Jr. G	Bronx, New York	St. Raymond	6 ft 5 in (1.96 m)	210 lb (95 kg)	Feb 26, 2024
Brandon Stores, Jr. G	Recruit ratings: Scout: Rivals: 247Sports: ESPN: (80)				
Mouhamed Sylla; C	Louga, Senegal	Belle Vista Prep	6 ft 10 in (2.08 m)	240 lb (110 kg)	Jan 16, 2025
Mouhamed Sylla; C	Recruit ratings: Scout: Rivals: 247Sports: ESPN: (88)				
Overall recruit ranking: Scout: 31 Rivals: 29 ESPN: 17
Note: In many cases, Scout, Rivals, 247Sports, On3, and ESPN may conflict in their listings of height and weight.; In these cases, the average was taken. ESPN grades are on a 100-point scale.; Sources: "2025 Georgia Tech Commits". Rivals.; "Georgia Tech 2025 Basketball Commits". Scout.; "Georgia Tech Yellow Jackets". ESPN.; "Scout.com Team Recruiting Rankings". Scout.; "2025 Team Ranking". Rivals.

== Roster ==
2025–26 Georgia Tech Yellow Jackets men's basketball team
Players
Coaches

Pos.	#	Name	Height	Weight	Year	Previous school	Hometown
G	0	Akai Fleming	6 ft 4 in (1.93 m)	184 lb (83 kg)	Fr	Overtime Elite	Marietta, GA
G	1	Lamar Washington	6 ft 4 in (1.93 m)	200 lb (91 kg)	Sr	Compass Prep; Pacific	Portland, OR
G	2	Eric Chatfield Jr.	5 ft 11 in (1.8 m)	160 lb (73 kg)	Fr	Pace Academy	Atlanta, GA
G	3	Jaeden Mustaf	6 ft 6 in (1.98 m)	210 lb (95 kg)	So	Overtime Elite	Bowie, MD
C	5	Peyton Marshall	7 ft 0 in (2.13 m)	300 lb (136 kg)	So	Kell; Missouri	Atlanta, GA
C	6	Mouhamed Sylla	6 ft 10 in (2.08 m)	210 lb (95 kg)	Fr	Belle Vista Prep	Louga, Senegal
G	7	Chas Kelley III	6 ft 3 in (1.91 m)	185 lb (84 kg)	Sr	The Phelps School; Boston College	Houston, TX
C	8	Cole Kirouac	7 ft 0 in (2.13 m)	199 lb (90 kg)	Fr	Overtime Elite	Cumming, GA
G	10	Davi Remagen	6 ft 3 in (1.91 m)	193 lb (88 kg)	Fr	RheinStars Köln	Cologne, Germany
F	11	Baye Ndongo	6 ft 9 in (2.06 m)	240 lb (109 kg)	Jr	Putnam Science Academy	Mboro, Senegal
G/F	12	Kam Craft	6 ft 6 in (1.98 m)	205 lb (93 kg)	RS Jr	The Skill Factory; Miami (OH)	Chicago, IL
G	14	Kowacie Reeves	6 ft 7 in (2.01 m)	202 lb (92 kg)	Sr	Westside HS; Florida	Macon, GA
G	23	Brandon Stores Jr.	6 ft 5 in (1.96 m)	210 lb (95 kg)	Fr	St. Raymond	Bronx, NY
G/F	32	Dyllan Thompson	6 ft 7 in (2.01 m)	215 lb (98 kg)	RS Fr	Second Baptist	Sugar Land, TX

Head coach

- Damon Stoudamire (Arizona)

Assistant coach(es)

- Karl Hobbs (Connecticut)
- B. J. Elder (Georgia Tech)
- Pershin Williams (North Florida)
- Nate Babcock (UW–Eau Claire)
- Bonzi Wells (Ball State)

Legend

- (C) Team captain
- (S) Suspended
- (I) Ineligible
- (W) Walk-on
- Injured
- Current redshirt

Roster
Last update: October 30, 2025

== Schedule and results ==
Date time, TV	Rank^{#}	Opponent^{#}	Result	Record	High points	High rebounds	High assists	Site (attendance) city, state
Non-conference regular season
November 3, 2025*; 7:30 p.m., ACCNX		Maryland Eastern Shore	W 56–52 ^{OT}	1–0	14 – Sylla	15 – Sylla	4 – Reeves	McCamish Pavilion (3,551); Atlanta, GA
November 7, 2025*; 7:30 p.m., ACCNX		Bryant	W 74–45	2–0	18 – Reeves Jr.	11 – Sylla	5 – Mustaf	McCamish Pavilion (4,886); Atlanta, GA
November 10, 2025*; 9:00 p.m., ACCN		Southeastern Louisiana	W 70–60	3–0	16 – Sylla	10 – Sylla	5 – Ndongo	McCamish Pavilion (4,585); Atlanta, GA
November 14, 2025*; 9:00 p.m., SECN		at Georgia; Rivalry	L 87–92	3–1	17 – Craft	8 – Sylla	6 – Mustaf	Stegeman Coliseum (10,523); Athens, GA
November 18, 2025*; 7:30 p.m., ACCNX		Georgia Southern	W 68–66	4–1	20 – Ndongo	11 – Sylla	4 – Tied	McCamish Pavilion (5,128); Atlanta, GA
November 23, 2025*; 2:00 p.m., ACCNX		West Georgia	W 82–66	5–1	18 – Reeves Jr.	14 – Ndongo	7 – Washington	McCamish Pavilion (4,772); Atlanta, GA
November 28, 2025*; 7:00 p.m., CBSSN		vs. DePaul; Emerald Coast Classic Semifinals	L 61–75	5–2	13 – Fleming	8 – Ndongo	7 – Washington	Raider Arena (1,200); Niceville, FL
November 29, 2025*; 4:00 p.m., CBSSN		vs. Drake; Emerald Coast Classic Consolation Game	L 74–84	5–3	15 – Fleming	7 – Tied	6 – Washington	Raider Arena (1,500); Niceville, FL
December 3, 2025*; 9:15 p.m., ACCN		Mississippi State; ACC–SEC Challenge	L 73–85	5–4	23 – Reeves Jr.	9 – Reeves Jr.	5 – Washington	McCamish Pavilion (4,859); Atlanta, GA
December 6, 2025*; 12:00 p.m., ACCNX		Monmouth	W 79–67	6–4	23 – Tied	9 – Sylla	6 – Washington	McCamish Pavilion (4,595); Atlanta, GA
December 16, 2025*; 7:30 p.m., ACCNX		Marist	W 87–76	7–4	21 – Reeves Jr.	10 – Reeves Jr.	10 – Washington	McCamish Pavilion (5,674); Atlanta, GA
December 20, 2025*; 2:00 p.m., ACCN		Lafayette	W 95–81	8–4	20 – Tied	9 – Reeves Jr.	10 – Washington	McCamish Pavilion (4,987); Atlanta, GA
December 28, 2025*; 2:30 p.m., ACCNX		Florida A&M	W 89–65	9–4	15 – Ndongo	11 – Ndongo	8 – Washington	McCamish Pavilion (5,967); Atlanta, GA
ACC regular season
December 31, 2025; 4:00 p.m., ACCN		at No. 6 Duke	L 79–85	9–5 (0–1)	23 – Reeves Jr.	7 – Mustaf	6 – Washington	Cameron Indoor Stadium (9,314); Durham, NC
January 3, 2026; 2:00 p.m., ACCN		Boston College	W 65–53	10–5 (1–1)	17 – Washington	12 – Washington	5 – Washington	McCamish Pavilion (5,978); Atlanta, GA
January 6, 2026; 7:00 p.m., ACCN		Syracuse	L 72–82	10–6 (1–2)	20 – Ndongo	9 – Ndongo	7 – Washington	McCamish Pavilion (6,216); Atlanta, GA
January 10, 2026; 12:00 p.m., ESPN2		at Miami (FL)	L 81–91	10–7 (1–3)	23 – Reeves Jr.	7 – Ndongo	12 – Washington	Watsco Center (5,328); Coral Gables, FL
January 14, 2026; 7:00 p.m., ACCN		Pittsburgh	L 66–89	10–8 (1–4)	14 – Craft	8 – Ndongo	3 – Tied	McCamish Pavilion (5,269); Atlanta, GA
January 17, 2026; 12:00 p.m., The CW		at NC State	W 78–74	11–8 (2–4)	21 – Reeves Jr.	10 – Mustaf	3 – Tied	Lenovo Center (16,378); Raleigh, NC
January 24, 2026; 12:00 p.m., ACCN		No. 18 Clemson	L 63–77	11–9 (2–5)	19 – Reeves Jr.	10 – Ndongo	5 – Washington	McCamish Pavilion (6,781); Atlanta, GA
January 27, 2026; 8:00 p.m., ACCN		at Virginia Tech	L 65–71	11–10 (2–6)	16 – Mustaf	11 – Mustaf	5 – Washington	Cassell Coliseum (7,769); Blacksburg, VA
January 31, 2026; 2:00 p.m., ACCN		No. 16 North Carolina	L 75–91	11–11 (2–7)	27 – Ndongo	7 – Tied	4 – Tied	McCamish Pavilion (8,700); Atlanta, GA
February 4, 2026; 8:00 p.m., ACCN		at California	L 85–90	11–12 (2–8)	19 – Fleming	12 – Ndongo	8 – Ndongo	Haas Pavilion (6,018); Berkeley, CA
February 7, 2026; 8:00 p.m., ESPNU		at Stanford	L 72–95	11–13 (2–9)	19 – Fleming	8 – Washington	3 – Chatfield Jr.	Maples Pavilion (4,812); Stanford, CA
February 11, 2026; 9:00 p.m., ACCN		Wake Forest	L 67–83	11–14 (2–10)	18 – Reeves Jr.	9 – Ndongo	5 – Fleming	McCamish Pavilion (4,879); Atlanta, GA
February 14, 2026; 12:00 p.m., The CW		at Notre Dame	L 74–89	11–15 (2–11)	16 – Reeves Jr.	12 – Ndongo	4 – Chatfield Jr.	Purcell Pavilion (5,906); South Bend, IN
February 18, 2026; 9:00 p.m., ACCN		No. 14 Virginia	L 68–94	11–16 (2–12)	18 – Mustaf	8 – Ndongo	4 – Washington	McCamish Pavilion (5,056); Atlanta, GA
February 21, 2026; 2:15 p.m., The CW		at No. 21 Louisville	L 70–87	11–17 (2–13)	17 – Ndongo	11 – Kirouac	4 – Ndongo	KFC Yum! Center (16,350); Louisville, KY
February 28, 2026; 12:00 p.m., ACCN		Florida State	L 71–80	11–18 (2–14)	17 – Reeves Jr.	7 – Mustaf	8 – Mustaf	McCamish Pavilion (6,773); Atlanta, GA
March 4, 2026; 7:00 p.m., ESPNU		California	L 65–76	11–19 (2–15)	19 – Reeves Jr.	8 – Tied	10 – Washington	McCamish Pavilion (4,124); Atlanta, GA
March 7, 2026; 12:00 p.m., ACCN		at Clemson	L 76–79	11–20 (2–16)	28 – Mustaf	10 – Ndongo	3 – Tied	Littlejohn Coliseum (6,977); Clemson, SC
*Non-conference game. ^{#}Rankings from AP poll. (#) Tournament seedings in parentheses. All times are in Eastern Time.
