= 2025–26 Boston College Eagles men's basketball team =

American college basketball season

2025–26 Boston College Eagles men's basketball
- Conference: Atlantic Coast Conference
- Record: 11–20 (4–14 ACC)
- Head coach: Earl Grant (5th season)
- Assistant coaches: Corey McCrae (4th season); Jim Molinari (5th season); Steve Smith (2nd season)
- Home arena: Conte Forum

2025–26 ACC men's basketball standings
	Conf.				Overall
Team	W		L	PCT	W		L	PCT
No. 4 Duke †	17	–	1	.944	35	–	3	.921
No. 17 Virginia	15	–	3	.833	30	–	6	.833
No. 24 Miami (FL)	13	–	5	.722	26	–	9	.743
North Carolina	12	–	6	.667	24	–	9	.727
Clemson	12	–	6	.667	24	–	11	.686
No. 23 Louisville	11	–	7	.611	24	–	11	.686
NC State	10	–	8	.556	20	–	14	.588
Florida State	10	–	8	.556	18	–	15	.545
California	9	–	9	.500	22	–	12	.647
Stanford	9	–	9	.500	20	–	13	.606
SMU	8	–	10	.444	20	–	14	.588
Virginia Tech	8	–	10	.444	19	–	13	.594
Wake Forest	7	–	11	.389	18	–	17	.514
Syracuse	6	–	12	.333	15	–	17	.469
Pittsburgh	5	–	13	.278	13	–	20	.394
Notre Dame	4	–	14	.222	13	–	18	.419
Boston College	4	–	14	.222	11	–	20	.355
Georgia Tech	2	–	16	.111	11	–	20	.355
† 2026 ACC tournament winner Rankings from AP Poll

The 2025–26 Boston College Eagles men's basketball team represented Boston College during the 2025–26 NCAA Division I men's basketball season. The Eagles were led by fifth-year head coach Earl Grant in what would be his final season, and played their home games at the Conte Forum as members of the Atlantic Coast Conference.

The Eagles finished the season 11–20 and went 4–16 in ACC play, finishing in seventeenth place for the second consecutive season. Grant was fired on March 8, 2026, having earned a losing record for the fourth time in five seasons and never coaching the team to a winning record in conference play. Under the ACC tournament rules, they did not qualify for the 2026 ACC tournament, becoming the only school to fail to qualify for both tournaments since the 2024 ACC expansion.

== Previous season ==
The Eagles finished the season 12–19 and 4–16 in ACC play to finish in 17th place. Under the new ACC tournament rules, they failed to qualify for the ACC tournament. They were not invited to the NCAA tournament or the National Invitation Tournament.

== Offseason ==
=== Departures ===
Departures
Name	Number	Pos.	Height	Weight	Year	Hometown	Reason for departure
Chas Kelly III	00	G	6'3"	185	Junior	Houston, Texas	Transferred to Georgia Tech
Dion Brown	1	G	6'3"	180	Junior	Great Barrington, Massachusetts	Transferred to Saint Louis
Roger McFarlane	3	G	6'4"	215	Graduate Student	Fort Lauderdale, Florida	Graduated
Joshua Beadle	7	G	6'3"	180	Graduate Student	Columbia, South Carolina	Entered transfer portal
Ethan Soares	20	G	6'4"	225	Sophomore	Houston, Texas	—
Elijah Strong	31	F	6'8"	235	Sophomore	Charlotte, North Carolina	Transferred to South Carolina
Chad Venning	32	F/C	6'9"	270	Graduate Student	Brooklyn, New York	Graduated

=== Incoming transfers ===
Boston College incoming transfers
Name	Number	Pos.	Height	Weight	Year	Hometown	Previous school
Chase Forte	9	G	6'4"	190	Graduate Student	Raleigh, North Carolina	South Dakota
Aidan Shaw	23	G/F	6'9"	210	Senior	Overland Park, Kansas	Missouri
Boden Kapke	33	F/C	6'11"	255	Junior	Victoria, Minnesota	Butler
Jason Asemota	55	F	6'8"	205	Sophomore	Lynn, Massachusetts	Baylor

=== 2025 Recruiting class ===
College recruiting
Name	Hometown	School	Height	Weight	Commit date
Jack Bailey; F	New York, New York	Blair Academy	6 ft 10 in (2.08 m)	210 lb (95 kg)	Jul 6, 2024
Jack Bailey; F	Recruit ratings: Scout: Rivals: 247Sports: ESPN: (79)				
Marko Radunovic; G/F	Podgorica, Montenegro	KK Podgorica	6 ft 6 in (1.98 m)	205 lb (93 kg)	Sep 10, 2025
Marko Radunovic; G/F	Recruit ratings: Scout: Rivals: 247Sports: ESPN: (NR)				
Caleb Steger; G	Dallas, Texas	Jesuit Dallas	6 ft 5 in (1.96 m)	180 lb (82 kg)	Aug 1, 2024
Caleb Steger; G	Recruit ratings: Scout: Rivals: 247Sports: ESPN: (78)				
Akbar Waheed III; G	North Bethesda, Maryland	Georgetown Prep	6 ft 6 in (1.98 m)	205 lb (93 kg)	Jul 15, 2024
Akbar Waheed III; G	Recruit ratings: Scout: Rivals: 247Sports: ESPN: (80)				
Overall recruit ranking: Scout: 51 Rivals: 68 ESPN: NR
Note: In many cases, Scout, Rivals, 247Sports, On3, and ESPN may conflict in their listings of height and weight.; In these cases, the average was taken. ESPN grades are on a 100-point scale.; Sources: "Boston College Eagles". Rivals.; "Boston College 2025 Basketball Commits". Scout.; "Boston College Eagles". ESPN.; "Scout.com Team Recruiting Rankings". Scout.; "2025 Team Ranking". Rivals.

== Roster ==
2025–26 Boston College Eagles men's basketball team
Players
Coaches

Pos.	#	Name	Height	Weight	Year	Previous school	Hometown
F	2	Jack Bailey	6 ft 10 in (2.08 m)	210 lb (95 kg)	Fr	Blair Academy	New York, NY
G	3	Akbar Waheed III	6 ft 6 in (1.98 m)	205 lb (93 kg)	Fr	Georgetown Prep	North Bethesda, MD
G	4	Jack Di Donna	6 ft 0 in (1.83 m)	185 lb (84 kg)	Jr	Saint Andrew's	Boca Raton, FL
G	5	Fred Payne	6 ft 2 in (1.88 m)	185 lb (84 kg)	RS So	Legacy the School of Sport Sciences	Grambling, LA
F	8	Kany Tchanda	6 ft 9 in (2.06 m)	200 lb (91 kg)	So	Sunrise Christian	Kinshasa, DRC
G	9	Chase Forte	6 ft 4 in (1.93 m)	190 lb (86 kg)	GS	Word of God Christian Academy; South Dakota	Raleigh, NC
G	10	Luka Toews	6 ft 1 in (1.85 m)	190 lb (86 kg)	So	The Newman School	Tokyo, Japan
G	11	Nick Petronio	6 ft 3 in (1.91 m)	195 lb (88 kg)	RS Fr	Milton Academy	Needham, MA
G	13	Donald Hand Jr.	6 ft 5 in (1.96 m)	210 lb (95 kg)	RS Jr	Landstown	Virginia Beach, VA
G	21	Jack Eggemeier (W)	6 ft 2 in (1.88 m)	190 lb (86 kg)	So	Menlo School	Menlo Park, CA
F	22	Jayden Hastings	6 ft 9 in (2.06 m)	240 lb (109 kg)	RS So	IMG Academy	Orlando, FL
G/F	23	Aidan Shaw	6 ft 9 in (2.06 m)	210 lb (95 kg)	Sr	Blue Valley; Missouri	Overland Park, KS
G	30	Caleb Steger	6 ft 5 in (1.96 m)	180 lb (82 kg)	Fr	Jesuit Dallas	Dallas, TX
F/C	33	Boden Kapke	6 ft 11 in (2.11 m)	255 lb (116 kg)	Jr	Holy Family; Butler	Victoria, MN
F	55	Jason Asemota	6 ft 8 in (2.03 m)	205 lb (93 kg)	So	Hillcrest Prep; Baylor	Lynn, MA
G/F	88	Marko Radunovic	6 ft 6 in (1.98 m)	205 lb (93 kg)	Fr	KK Podgorica	Podgorica, MNE

Head coach

- Earl Grant (Georgia College)

Assistant coach(es)

- Corey McCrae (Wagner)
- Jim Molinari (Illinois Wesleyan)
- Steve Smith (Morgan State)

Legend

- (C) Team captain
- (S) Suspended
- (I) Ineligible
- (W) Walk-on
- Injured
- Current redshirt

Roster
Last update: October 21, 2025

== Schedule and results ==
Date time, TV	Rank^{#}	Opponent^{#}	Result	Record	High points	High rebounds	High assists	Site (attendance) city, state
Exhibition
October 13, 2025*; 7:00 p.m., NBCSB		vs. UConn; Naismith Basketball Hall of Fame Exhibition	L 52–71	–	23 – Hand Jr.	8 – Shaw	1 – Tied	Mohegan Sun Arena (6,456); Uncasville, CT
Regular season
November 3, 2025*; 7:00 p.m., ESPNU		at Florida Atlantic	L 78–83 ^{OT}	0–1	20 – Hand Jr.	8 – Tied	7 – Payne	Eleanor R. Baldwin Arena (3,161); Boca Raton, FL
November 6, 2025*; 7:00 p.m., ACCNX		The Citadel	W 76–47	1–1	18 – Hand Jr.	9 – Radunovic	6 – Forte	Conte Forum (2,538); Chestnut Hill, MA
November 11, 2025*; 7:00 p.m., ACCNX		Central Connecticut	L 59–60	1–2	17 – Payne	8 – Tied	3 – Tied	Conte Forum (3,774); Chestnut Hill, MA
November 15, 2025*; 2:00 p.m., ESPN+		at Temple	W 76–71	2–2	18 – Hand Jr.	14 – Shaw	4 – Payne	Liacouras Center (3,063); Philadelphia, PA
November 18, 2025*; 7:00 p.m., ACCNX		Hampton	W 63–52	3–2	14 – Payne	8 – Shaw	4 – Toews	Conte Forum (3,751); Chestnut Hill, MA
November 21, 2025*; 3:30 p.m., ESPN2		vs. Davidson; Charleston Classic Lowcountry Bracket Semifinal	L 49–59	3–3	14 – Hand Jr.	10 – Hastings	4 – Forte	TD Arena (2,112); Charleston, SC
November 23, 2025*; 6:30 p.m., ESPN2		vs. Tulane; Charleston Classic Lowcountry Bracket consolation game	L 90–93 ^{OT}	3–4	26 – Hand Jr.	10 – Shaw	4 – Payne	TD Arena (1,817); Charleston, SC
November 26, 2025*; 4:00 p.m., ACCNX		Harvard	W 73–60	4–4	17 – Payne	6 – Tied	4 – Forte	Conte Forum (4,439); Chestnut Hill, MA
December 3, 2025*; 7:15 p.m., ACCN		LSU; ACC–SEC Challenge	L 69–78 ^{OT}	4–5	14 – Toews	10 – Hastings	3 – Hand Jr.	Conte Forum (4,060); Chestnut Hill, MA
December 6, 2025*; 12:00 p.m., ACCNX		New Haven	W 67–63	5–5	18 – Payne	7 – Asemota	2 – Tied	Conte Forum (4,064); Chestnut Hill, MA
December 10, 2025*; 7:00 p.m., ESPNU		vs. UMass; Basketball Hall of Fame Classic	L 74–76	5–6	18 – Hand	7 – Asemota	5 – Forte	MassMutual Center (5,853); Springfield, MA
December 22, 2025*; 7:00 p.m., ACCNX		Fairleigh Dickinson	W 72–61	6–6	21 – Toews	11 – Shaw	3 – Tied	Conte Forum (2,833); Chestnut Hill, MA
December 28, 2025*; 2:00 p.m., ACCNX		Le Moyne	W 72–64	7–6	26 – Hand Jr.	11 – Kapke	5 – Forte	Conte Forum (4,768); Chestnut Hill, MA
ACC regular season
January 3, 2026; 2:00 p.m., ACCN		at Georgia Tech	L 53–65	7–7 (0–1)	13 – Tied	11 – Kapke	3 – Toews	McCamish Pavilion (5,978); Atlanta, GA
January 6, 2026; 9:00 p.m., ACCNX		NC State	L 71–79	7–8 (0–2)	24 – Payne	9 – Hastings	4 – Payne	Conte Forum (1,892); Chestnut Hill, MA
January 10, 2026; 12:00 p.m., The CW		at No. 20 Louisville	L 62–75	7–9 (0–3)	22 – Payne	7 – Kapke	4 – Payne	KFC Yum! Center (14,585); Louisville, KY
January 13, 2026; 7:00 p.m., ACCN		at No. 22 Clemson	L 50–74	7–10 (0–4)	20 – Payne	8 – Kapke	3 – Hand Jr.	Littlejohn Coliseum (7,320); Clemson, SC
January 17, 2026; 2:00 p.m., ACCN		Syracuse	W 81–73 ^{OT}	8–10 (1–4)	26 – Payne	13 – Hastings	6 – Payne	Conte Forum (8,606); Chestnut Hill, MA
January 21, 2026; 7:00 p.m., ACCN		Pittsburgh	W 65–62	9–10 (2–4)	19 – Kapke	7 – Hand Jr.	6 – Forte	Conte Forum (3,233); Chestnut Hill, MA
January 24, 2026; 6:00 p.m., ACCN		at Notre Dame	L 64–68	9–11 (2–5)	18 – Payne	9 – Kapke	4 – Payne	Joyce Center (5,248); South Bend, IN
January 31, 2026; 1:30 p.m., The CW		No. 17 Virginia	L 66–73	9–12 (2–6)	20 – Hand Jr.	7 – Payne	4 – Hand Jr.	Conte Forum (6,248); Chestnut Hill, MA
February 3, 2026; 7:00 p.m., ACCN		at No. 4 Duke	L 49–67	9–13 (2–7)	14 – Payne	9 – Hastings	3 – Forte	Cameron Indoor Stadium (9,314); Durham, NC
February 7, 2026; 2:00 p.m., ACCN		Miami (FL)	L 68–74	9–14 (2–8)	20 – Hand Jr.	11 – Kapke	4 – Forte	Conte Forum (6,133); Chestnut Hill, MA
February 11, 2026; 9:00 p.m., ESPNU		Stanford	L 64–70	9–15 (2–9)	15 – Kapke	8 – Kapke	2 – Tied	Conte Forum (2,403); Chestnut Hill, MA
February 14, 2026; 12:00 p.m., ACCN		California	L 66–73	9–16 (2–10)	16 – Payne	8 – Hastings	5 – Toews	Conte Forum (3,485); Chestnut Hill, MA
February 17, 2026; 6:00 p.m., ACCN		at Florida State	L 72–80	9–17 (2–11)	22 – Payne	6 – Shaw	8 – Toews	Donald L. Tucker Center (4,577); Tallahassee, FL
February 21, 2026; 4:00 p.m., ACCN		at SMU	L 70–94	9–18 (2–12)	20 – Payne	8 – Asemota	7 – Forte	Moody Coliseum (7,106); University Park, TX
February 25, 2026; 6:00 p.m., ACCN		Wake Forest	W 68–67	10–18 (3–12)	23 – Payne	10 – Kapke	4 – Toews	Conte Forum (2,811); Chestnut Hill, MA
February 28, 2026; 2:00 p.m., ACCN		at Miami (FL)	L 54–76	10–19 (3–13)	18 – Kapke	6 – Hastings	3 – Payne	Watsco Center (6,040); Coral Gables, FL
March 3, 2026; 9:00 p.m., ESPNU		at Virginia Tech	L 63–72	10–20 (3–14)	25 – Kapke	12 – Payne	4 – Forte	Cassell Coliseum (5,071); Blacksburg, VA
March 7, 2026; 12:00 p.m., ESPNU		Notre Dame	W 77–69	11–20 (4–14)	24 – Payne	9 – Payne	4 – Tied	Conte Forum (5,029); Chestnut Hill, MA
*Non-conference game. ^{#}Rankings from AP Poll. (#) Tournament seedings in parentheses. All times are in Eastern Time.
