= Obinna Ekezie =

Nigerian basketball player (born 1975)

Personal information
- Born: August 22, 1975 (age 51) Port Harcourt, Rivers State, Nigeria
- Listed height: 6 ft 9 in (2.06 m)
- Listed weight: 270 lb (122 kg)

Career information
- High school: Worcester Academy (Worcester, Massachusetts)
- College: Maryland (1995–1999)
- NBA draft: 1999: 2nd round, 37th overall pick
- Drafted by: Vancouver Grizzlies
- Playing career: 1999–2007
- Position: Center / power forward
- Number: 54

Career history
- 1999–2000: Vancouver Grizzlies
- 2000–2001: Washington Wizards
- 2001: Dallas Mavericks
- 2001–2002: Los Angeles Clippers
- 2002–2003: Red Star Belgrade
- 2004–2005: Columbus Riverdragons
- 2005: Atlanta Hawks
- 2006: Virtus Roma
- 2006–2007: Dynamo Moscow
- Stats at NBA.com
- Stats at Basketball Reference

Obinna Ralph Ekezie (born August 22, 1975) is a Nigerian former professional basketball player who played in the NBA and other leagues. His name, Obinna, means "Father's heart". He is a direct descendant of the 19th century Igbo warrior and businessman Duruike Akubugali, hence hails from Obor Autonomous Community in Orlu, Imo State.

== Career ==
Obinna Ekezie moved to the US when he was 18 years old to continue his education and play high school basketball at Worcester Academy in Massachusetts for two years (1993–1995). A 6'10" 270 lb center, Ekezie was selected with the 37th overall pick in the 1999 NBA draft by the Vancouver Grizzlies after playing with the Maryland Terrapins from 1995–1999. Obinna prepared for college at Worcester Academy, graduating in 1995.

Ekezie played for five NBA teams (1999–2005), and also professionally with Red Star Belgrade (Serbia), Lottomatica Roma (Italy), and Dynamo Moscow. Ekezie was invited to Atlanta Hawks training camp where he was a leading scorer averaging 11.8 points on 48.8 field goal percentage. Ekezie then suffered an anterior cruciate ligament injury on October 13, 2005, in an exhibition game after landing awkwardly.

After retiring from basketball in 2007, Ekezie entered the travel industry. In 2008, he founded ZeepTravel, an online platform initially focused on hotel reservations and travel services between Africa and the United States. The company later expanded and was rebranded as Wakanow in 2010, co‑founded with Ralph Tamuno.

== Personal life ==
His son, Obinna Ekezie Jr., plays college basketball for the Louisville Cardinals.
