= 2025–26 Pittsburgh Panthers men's basketball team =

American college basketball season

2025–26 Pittsburgh Panthers men's basketball
- Conference: Atlantic Coast Conference
- Record: 13–20 (5–13 ACC)
- Head coach: Jeff Capel (8th season)
- Associate head coach: Tim O'Toole (8th season)
- Assistant coaches: Milan Brown (8th season); Jason Capel (8th season); Kyle Cieplicki; Gilbert Brown
- Home arena: Petersen Events Center (Capacity: 12,508)

2025–26 ACC men's basketball standings
	Conf.				Overall
Team	W		L	PCT	W		L	PCT
No. 4 Duke †	17	–	1	.944	35	–	3	.921
No. 17 Virginia	15	–	3	.833	30	–	6	.833
No. 24 Miami (FL)	13	–	5	.722	26	–	9	.743
North Carolina	12	–	6	.667	24	–	9	.727
Clemson	12	–	6	.667	24	–	11	.686
No. 23 Louisville	11	–	7	.611	24	–	11	.686
NC State	10	–	8	.556	20	–	14	.588
Florida State	10	–	8	.556	18	–	15	.545
California	9	–	9	.500	22	–	12	.647
Stanford	9	–	9	.500	20	–	13	.606
SMU	8	–	10	.444	20	–	14	.588
Virginia Tech	8	–	10	.444	19	–	13	.594
Wake Forest	7	–	11	.389	18	–	17	.514
Syracuse	6	–	12	.333	15	–	17	.469
Pittsburgh	5	–	13	.278	13	–	20	.394
Notre Dame	4	–	14	.222	13	–	18	.419
Boston College	4	–	14	.222	11	–	20	.355
Georgia Tech	2	–	16	.111	11	–	20	.355
† 2026 ACC tournament winner Rankings from AP Poll

The 2025–26 Pittsburgh Panthers men's basketball team represented the University of Pittsburgh during the 2025–26 NCAA Division I men's basketball season. The Panthers, led by eighth-year head coach Jeff Capel, played their home games at the Petersen Events Center in Pittsburgh, Pennsylvania as members of the Atlantic Coast Conference.

The Panthers began their season with three straight wins before their rivalry match at West Virginia. The Panthers lost the game, 49–71 for their first loss of the season. They defeated Bucknell 84–50 before traveling to Daytona Beach, Florida to participate in the Legends Classic. There they lost both of their games, against non-Power 4 opponents before returning to Pittsburgh. They defeated Ohio State by one point on their return. However, the team could not convert that win into momentum, as their lost their next three games. This run included an eight-point loss to Texas A&M in their ACC–SEC Challenge game. The Panthers won their final two non-conference games, including a thirty-four point defeat of Penn State. They started the ACC season slowly, as they went 1–6 in their first seven games. Their only victory came against Georgia Tech. They only lost to one ranked team over the stretch, a 59–100 loss against twentieth-ranked Louisville. The Panthers went 1–5 in their next six games, and their only victory was over Wake Forest in overtime. They lost to four teams over this stretch: fourth-ranked Duke, eleventh-ranked North Carolina, eighteenth-ranked Virginia, and twenty-second ranked Clemson. The Panthers produced their best stretch to end the season, going 3–2 to finish the regular season. They defeated Notre Dame, California, and Syracuse while losing to Stanford, and Florida State.

The Panthers finished the 2025–26 season 13–20, 5–13 in ACC play, to finish in fifteenth place. As the fifteenth-seed in the ACC tournament they upset tenth-seed Stanford before losing to seventh-seed NC State in the Second Round. They were not invited to any post-season tournaments.

== Previous season ==
The Panthers finished the 2024–25 season 17–15, 8–12 in ACC play, to finish in a five-way tie for ninth place. They were defeated by Notre Dame in the first round of the ACC tournament.

== Offseason ==
=== Departures ===
Departures
Name	Number	Pos.	Height	Weight	Year	Hometown	Reason for Departure
Damian Dunn	1	G	6'5"	205	Graduate Student	Kinston, NC	Graduated
Ishmael Leggett	5	G	6'3"	185	Senior	Washington, D.C.	Graduated
Marlon Barnes Jr.	11	F	6'6"	190	(redshirt) Freshman	Cleveland, OH	Transferred to Evansville
Jaland Lowe	15	G	6'3"	175	Sophomore	Missouri City, TX	Transferred to Kentucky
Vason Stevenson	21	F	6'3"	190	Junior	McKees Rocks, PA	Graduated
Liam Mignogna	24	C	6'9"	250	Freshman	Gibsonia, PA	Walk on; didn't return
Guillermo Diaz Graham	25	F	7'0"	225	Senior	Canary Islands, Spain	Transferred to San Francisco
Jorge Diaz Graham	31	F	6'11"	215	Senior	Canary Islands, Spain	Transferred to Oregon State
Amsal Delalić	52	G	6'8"	210	Freshman	Tuzla, Bosnia and Herzegovina	Transferred to DePaul
Zack Austin	55	F	6'7"	210	(redshirt) Senior	Winston-Salem, NC	Graduated

=== Incoming transfers ===
Incoming transfers
Name	Number	Pos.	Height	Weight	Year	Hometown	Previous School
Dishon Jackson	1	C	6'11"	270	Fifth Year	Oakland, California	Iowa State
Damarco Minor	7	G	6'0"	190	Fifth Year	Chicago, Illinois	Oregon State
Barry Dunning Jr.	22	G/F	6'6"	195	Senior	Mobile, Alabama	South Alabama
Nojus Indrušaitis	25	G	6'5"	200	Sophomore	Lemont, Illinois	Iowa State

=== 2025 recruiting class ===
College recruiting
Name	Hometown	School	Height	Weight	Commit date
Henry Lau; SF	Sydney, NSW		6 ft 7 in (2.01 m)	N/A	May 2, 2025
Henry Lau; SF	Recruit ratings: (NR)				
Macari Moore; CG	Ann Arbor, MI	Huron HS	6 ft 3 in (1.91 m)	N/A	May 15, 2025
Macari Moore; CG	Recruit ratings: Rivals: 247Sports: ESPN: (NR)				
Kieran Mullen; C	Vancouver, BC	St. Thomas More	7 ft 0 in (2.13 m)	205 lb (93 kg)	Apr 28, 2025
Kieran Mullen; C	Recruit ratings: 247Sports: (NR)				
Roman Siulepa; PF	Brisbane, QLD	NBA Global Academy	6 ft 6 in (1.98 m)	220 lb (100 kg)	Jul 19, 2025
Roman Siulepa; PF	Recruit ratings: ESPN: (NR)				
Omari Witherspoon; SF	Washington, DC	St. John's College	6 ft 4 in (1.93 m)	180 lb (82 kg)	Sep 11, 2024
Omari Witherspoon; SF	Recruit ratings: Rivals: 247Sports: ESPN: (NR)				
Overall recruit ranking:
Note: In many cases, Scout, Rivals, 247Sports, On3, and ESPN may conflict in their listings of height and weight.; In these cases, the average was taken. ESPN grades are on a 100-point scale.; Sources: "Pittsburgh Panthers". ESPN.; "2025 Team Ranking". Rivals.

== Preseason ==
On October 14, 2025, the ACC released their preseason poll. Pittsburgh was picked to finish 14th in the conference.

=== Preseason rankings ===
ACC Preseason Poll
Place	Team	Points
1	Duke	866 (34)
2	Louisville	842 (15)
3	North Carolina	741
4	NC State	710
5	Virginia	623
6	SMU	616
7	Clemson	510
8	Miami (FL)	500
9	Syracuse	489
10	Notre Dame	477
11	Wake Forest	412
12	Virginia Tech	355
13	Georgia Tech	315
14	Pittsburgh	301
15	Florida State	221
16	California	156
17	Stanford	138
18	Boston College	107
(#) first-place votes

=== Preseason All-ACC Teams ===
No players were named to either First or Second Team Preseason All-ACC.

== Roster ==
2025–26 Pittsburgh Panthers men's basketball team
Players
Coaches

Pos.	#	Name	Height	Weight	Year	Previous school	Hometown
F	0	Amdy Ndiaye	6 ft 10 in (2.08 m)	210 lb (95 kg)	So	Putnam Science Academy	Dakar, Senegal
C	1	Dishon Jackson (5th)	6 ft 11 in (2.11 m)	270 lb (122 kg)	Sr	Iowa State	Oakland, California
F	2	Cameron Corhen	6 ft 10 in (2.08 m)	235 lb (107 kg)	Sr	Florida State	Allen, Texas
G	3	Brandin Cummings	6 ft 3 in (1.91 m)	175 lb (79 kg)	So	Lincoln Park High School	Midland, Pennsylvania
F	4	Papa Amadou Kante	6 ft 10 in (2.08 m)	235 lb (107 kg)	RS So	South Kent School	Dakar, Senegal
F	6	Henry Lau	6 ft 7 in (2.01 m)	195 lb (88 kg)	Fr	Sydney Kings	Sydney, Australia
G	7	Damarco Minor (5th)	6 ft 0 in (1.83 m)	190 lb (86 kg)	Sr	Oregon State	Chicago, Illinois
G	8	Omari Witherspoon	6 ft 4 in (1.93 m)	190 lb (86 kg)	Fr	St. John's College High School	Bowie, Maryland
C	12	Kieran Mullen	7 ft 0 in (2.13 m)	220 lb (100 kg)	Fr	St. Thomas More School	North Vancouver, British Columbia
F	13	Roman Siulepa	6 ft 6 in (1.98 m)	220 lb (100 kg)	Fr	South West Metro Pirates	Brisbane, Australia
G	21	Macari Moore	6 ft 3 in (1.91 m)	200 lb (91 kg)	Fr	Ann Arbor Huron High School	Ypsilanti, Michigan
G/F	22	Barry Dunning Jr.	6 ft 6 in (1.98 m)	195 lb (88 kg)	Sr	South Alabama	Mobile, Alabama
G	25	Nojus Indrušaitis	6 ft 5 in (1.96 m)	200 lb (91 kg)	So	Iowa State	Lemont, Illinois
F	35	Benjamin Mayhew (W)	6 ft 4 in (1.93 m)	180 lb (82 kg)	Jr	Propel Braddock Hills	Wilkinsburg, Pennsylvania
F	44	Jajuan Nelson (W)	6 ft 7 in (2.01 m)	215 lb (98 kg)	Jr	String Theory Charter	Philadelphia, Pennsylvania

Head coach

- Jeff Capel (Duke)

Assistant coach(es)

- Tim O'Toole (Fairfield)
- Milan Brown (Howard)
- Jason Capel (North Carolina)
- Kyle Cieplicki (Vermont)
- Gilbert Brown (Pittsburgh)

Legend

- (C) Team captain
- (S) Suspended
- (I) Ineligible
- (W) Walk-on
- (5th) Fifth-year senior
- Injured
- Current redshirt

Roster
Last update: November 4, 2025

== Schedule and results ==
Date time, TV	Rank^{#}	Opponent^{#}	Result	Record	High points	High rebounds	High assists	Site (attendance) city, state
Exhibition
October 19, 2025*; 2:00 p.m.		Providence	W 81–74	–	15 – Minor	7 – Indrušaitis	3 – Minor	Petersen Events Center; Pittsburgh, PA
October 27, 2025*; 7:00 p.m.		Pitt–Johnstown	W 100–65	–	21 – Corhen	5 – Corhen	5 – Witherspoon	Petersen Events Center (4,496); Pittsburgh, PA
Non-conference regular season
November 3, 2025*; 7:00 p.m., ACCNX		Youngstown State	W 74–59	1–0	23 – Corhen	12 – Corhen	3 – Minor	Petersen Events Center (5,050); Pittsburgh, PA
November 7, 2025*; 7:00 p.m., ACCNX		Longwood	W 78–60	2–0	23 – Minor	13 – Corhen	4 – Witherspoon	Petersen Events Center (5,134); Pittsburgh, PA
November 10, 2025*; 7:00 p.m., ACCNX		Eastern Michigan	W 78–66	3–0	16 – Corhen	7 – Tied	6 – Minor	Petersen Events Center (4,572); Pittsburgh, PA
November 13, 2025*; 6:00 p.m., FS1		at West Virginia; Backyard Brawl	L 49–71	3–1	14 – Corhen	10 – Corhen	4 – Witherspoon	Hope Coliseum (12,453); Morgantown, WV
November 17, 2025*; 7:00 p.m., ACCNX		Bucknell	W 84–50	4–1	23 – Dunning Jr.	11 – Amadou Kante	5 – Tied	Petersen Events Center (4,674); Pittsburgh, PA
November 20, 2025*; 7:00 p.m., ESPN2		vs. UCF; Legends Classic	L 66–77	4–2	17 – Corhen	11 – Corhen	4 – Minor	Ocean Center (1,006); Daytona Beach, FL
November 23, 2025*; 5:00 p.m., ACCNX		Quinnipiac; Legends Classic	L 75–83	4–3	20 – Siulepa	8 – Siulepa	3 – Tied	Petersen Events Center (4,721); Pittsburgh, PA
November 28, 2025*; 7:00 p.m., ESPN		Ohio State	W 67–66	5–3	18 – Tied	10 – Corhen	2 – Tied	Petersen Events Center (6,299); Pittsburgh, PA
December 2, 2025*; 7:00 p.m., ESPNU		Texas A&M; ACC–SEC Challenge	L 73–81	5–4	18 – Dunning Jr.	12 – Dunning Jr.	8 – Witherspoon	Petersen Events Center (4,945); Pittsburgh, PA
December 7, 2025*; 4:00 p.m., ACCN		Hofstra	L 73–80	5–5	34 – Cummings	8 – Dunning Jr.	5 – Tied	Petersen Events Center (4,660); Pittsburgh, PA
December 13, 2025*; 4:30 p.m., TNT/truTV		at Villanova	L 61–79	5–6	17 – Dunning Jr.	7 – Corhen	4 – Cummings	Finneran Pavilion (6,501); Villanova, PA
December 17, 2025*; 7:00 p.m., ACCNX		Binghamton	W 103–63	6–6	23 – Dunning Jr.	6 – Corhen	7 – Minor	Petersen Events Center (4,687); Pittsburgh, PA
December 21, 2025*; 12:00 p.m., BTN		vs. Penn State	W 80–46	7–6	28 – Siulepa	8 – Tied	7 – Minor	Giant Center (8,191); Hershey, PA
ACC regular season
December 30, 2025; 7:00 p.m., ACCN		at Miami (FL)	L 69–76	7–7 (0–1)	17 – Corhen	8 – Corhen	4 – Minor	Watsco Center (4,832); Coral Gables, FL
January 3, 2026; 12:00 p.m., The CW		Clemson	L 68–73	7–8 (0–2)	17 – Minor	7 – Siulepa	2 – Tied	Petersen Events Center (6,652); Pittsburgh, PA
January 10, 2026; 2:00 p.m., ACCN		Syracuse	L 72–83	7–9 (0–3)	29 – Cummings	8 – Tied	3 – Tied	Petersen Events Center (6,358); Pittsburgh, PA
January 14, 2026; 7:00 p.m., ACCN		at Georgia Tech	W 89–66	8–9 (1–3)	23 – Cummings	8 – Siulepa	7 – Minor	McCamish Pavilion (5,269); Atlanta, GA
January 17, 2026; 8:00 p.m., ESPN2		No. 20 Louisville	L 59–100	8–10 (1–4)	11 – Cummings	6 – Dunning Jr.	7 – Minor	Petersen Events Center (6,070); Pittsburgh, PA
January 21, 2026; 7:00 p.m., ACCN		at Boston College	L 62–65	8–11 (1–5)	13 – Tied	12 – Corhen	4 – Moore	Conte Forum (3,233); Chestnut Hill, MA
January 24, 2026; 12:00 p.m., ESPNU		NC State	L 72–81	8–12 (1–6)	15 – Siulepa	13 – Siulepa	4 – Indrušaitis	Petersen Events Center (5,572); Pittsburgh, PA
January 27, 2026; 6:00 p.m., ACCN		Wake Forest	W 80–76 ^{OT}	9–12 (2–6)	15 – Tied	15 – Siulepa	4 – Witherspoon	Petersen Events Center (4,970); Pittsburgh, PA
January 31, 2026; 12:00 p.m., ACCN		at No. 22 Clemson	L 52–63	9–13 (2–7)	12 – Tied	9 – Siulepa	2 – Tied	Littlejohn Coliseum (6,723); Clemson, SC
February 3, 2026; 9:00 p.m., ACCN		at No. 18 Virginia	L 47–67	9–14 (2–8)	11 – Tied	7 – Indrušaitis	4 – Witherspoon	John Paul Jones Arena (12,264); Charlottesville, VA
February 7, 2026; 2:00 p.m., The CW		SMU	L 67–86	9–15 (2–9)	15 – Corhen	7 – Dunning Jr.	5 – Minor	Petersen Events Center (6,680); Pittsburgh, PA
February 10, 2026; 9:00 p.m., ESPN		No. 4 Duke	L 54–70	9–16 (2–10)	19 – Siulepa	6 – Dunning Jr.	3 – Tied	Petersen Events Center (10,804); Pittsburgh, PA
February 14, 2026; 2:00 p.m., ESPN		at No. 11 North Carolina	L 65–79	9–17 (2–11)	23 – Corhen	8 – Dunning Jr.	6 – Corhen	Dean Smith Center (21,750); Chapel Hill, NC
February 21, 2026; 2:00 p.m., ACCN		Notre Dame	W 73–68	10–17 (3–11)	22 – Siulepa	8 – Corhen	5 – Witherspoon	Petersen Events Center (6,406); Pittsburgh, PA
February 25, 2026; 8:00 p.m., ACCN		at Stanford	L 67–75	10–18 (3–12)	22 – Corhen	8 – Corhen	4 – Tied	Maples Pavilion (3,771); Stanford, CA
February 28, 2026; 4:00 p.m., ACCN		at California	W 72–56	11–18 (4–12)	16 – Tied	12 – Dunning Jr.	6 – Witherspoon	Haas Pavilion (5,061); Berkeley, CA
March 4, 2026; 9:00 p.m., ACCN		Florida State	L 74–75	11–19 (4–13)	26 – Dunning Jr.	10 – Dunning Jr.	10 – Minor	Petersen Events Center (5,109); Pittsburgh, PA
March 7, 2026; 4:30 p.m., The CW		at Syracuse	W 71–69 ^{OT}	12–19 (5–13)	21 – Corhen	9 – Siulepa	3 – Minor	JMA Wireless Dome (19,837); Syracuse, NY
ACC tournament
March 10, 2026; 2:00 p.m., ACCN	(15)	vs. (10) Stanford; First Round	W 64–63	13–19	16 – Dunning Jr.	8 – Dunning Jr.	2 – Tied	Spectrum Center (6,593); Charlotte, NC
March 11, 2026; 12:00 p.m., ESPN2	(15)	vs. (7) NC State; Second Round	L 88–98	13–20	27 – Corhen	7 – Corhen	6 – Indrušaitis	Spectrum Center (8,116); Charlotte, NC
*Non-conference game. ^{#}Rankings from AP Poll. (#) Tournament seedings in parentheses. All times are in Eastern.
