= Obinna Ekezie Jr. =

Nigerian basketball player (born 2008)

No. 15 – Louisville Cardinals
- Position: Center
- League: Atlantic Coast Conference

Personal information
- Born: 8 May 2008 (age 18) Nigeria
- Listed height: 7 ft 2 in (2.18 m)
- Listed weight: 240 lb (109 kg)

Career information
- High school: Prolific Prep (Napa, California); Southeastern Prep (Orlando, Florida)
- College: Louisville (2026–present)

Obinna Ralph Ekezie Jr. (born 8 May 2008) is a Nigerian college basketball player for the Louisville Cardinals of the Atlantic Coast Conference (ACC). He was a five-star recruit and one of the top prospects in the class of 2026, following his reclassification from the class of 2027.

== Early life ==
Obinna Ekezie Jr. was born on 8 May 2008, in Nigeria, to Noella and Obinna Ekezie. His father was selected by the Vancouver Grizzlies in the 1999 NBA draft and played for five different NBA teams. Ekezie Jr. was introduced to basketball at a young age by his father, who taught him the fundamentals of the sport. However, he did not necessarily take it seriously at first, partly due to a lack of resources and infrastructure in Nigeria. In 2021, his father founded OBN Academy, a state-of-the-art facility in Lagos aimed at developing young African players through year-round instruction. Ekezie Jr. immediately began training there, saying: "That’s when I started really playing more organized basketball". A year later, he moved to the United States, enrolling at St. Raphael the Archangel Catholic School in Louisville, Kentucky, as an eighth grader.

For high school, Ekezie Jr. initially attended Prolific Prep in Napa, California. Following his freshman year, he played up a grade with Team Lillard on the Adidas 3SSB 16U circuit. As a sophomore, Ekezie Jr. helped Prolific Prep win its third consecutive Grind Session World Championship. He earned all-defense, all-underclassman, and all-Grind Session honors. That offseason, Ekezie Jr. joined Vegas Elite on the Nike Elite Youth Basketball League (EYBL) 16U circuit, though his participation was limited due to injury. He also attended the 2025 NBPA Top 100 Camp in Rock Hill, South Carolina. Ahead of his junior season, Ekezie Jr. transferred to Southeastern Prep in Orlando, Florida. That year, he averaged 12.4 points, 7.8 rebounds, and 1.8 blocks per game. In February 2026, Ekezie Jr. attended the 10th annual Basketball Without Borders All-Star Camp, which was held as part of NBA All-Star Weekend. He was named a camp all-star and the Defensive MVP.

=== Recruiting ===
Ekezie Jr. was originally considered one of the top recruits in the class of 2027. He was rated a five-star recruit by 247Sports and ESPN, and a four-star recruit by Rivals.com. Ekezie Jr. was also ranked No. 4 in the 247Sports composite rankings for the class of 2027. At one point, in early 2025, he was considered the No. 1 prospect in the class by On3.com (later Rivals.com).

In April 2026, Ekezie Jr. narrowed his top five choices down to Arkansas, BYU, Kentucky, Louisville, and Maryland. A week later, on 3 May, he reclassified to the class of 2026 and immediately committed to playing college basketball at Louisville for head coach Pat Kelsey.
