= Jai Lucas =

American basketball player (born 1988)

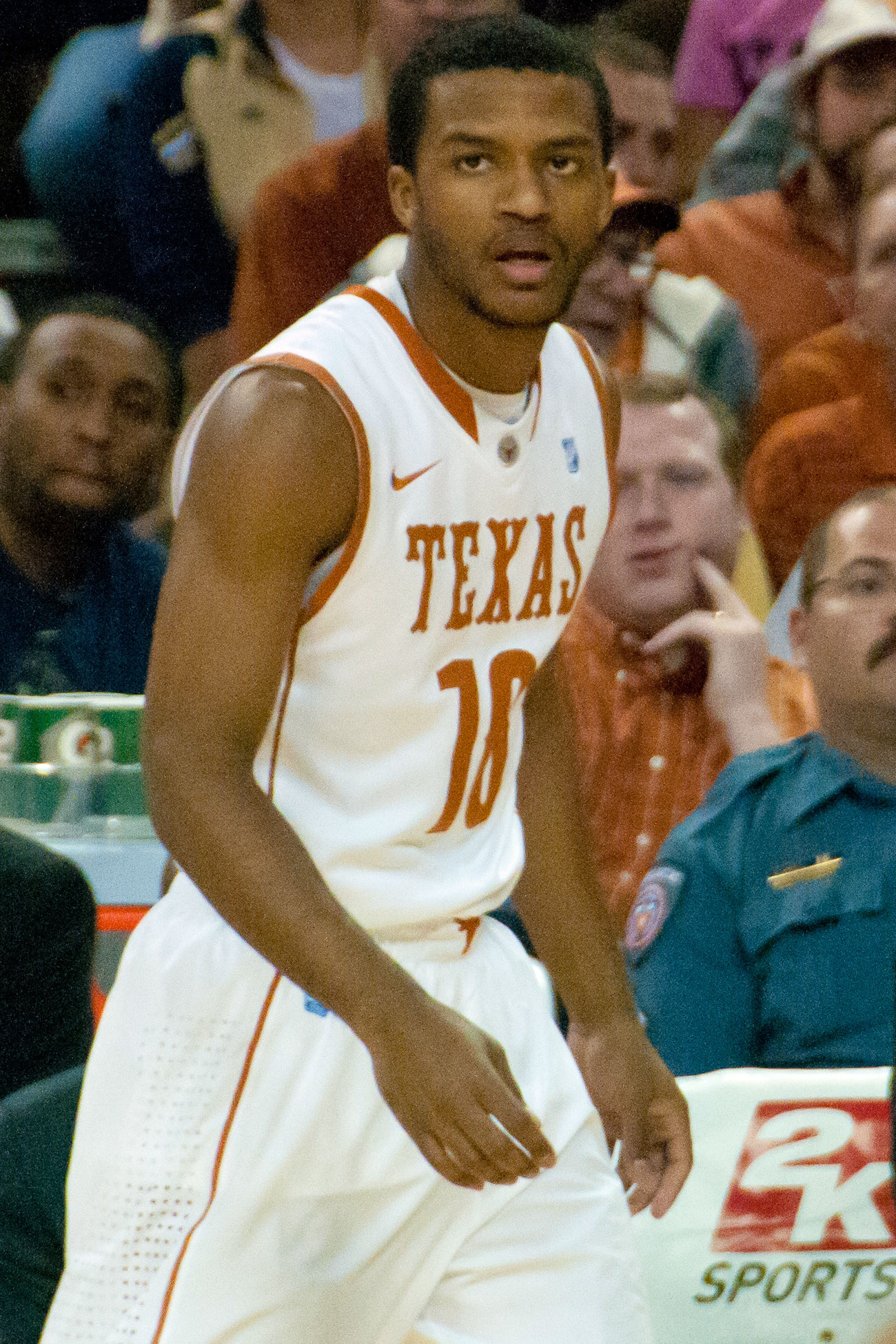
- Lucas with Texas in November 2010

Miami Hurricanes
- Title: Head coach
- League: Atlantic Coast Conference

Personal information
- Born: December 5, 1988 (age 37) Houston, Texas, U.S.
- Listed height: 5 ft 10 in (1.78 m)
- Listed weight: 160 lb (73 kg)

Career information
- High school: Bellaire (Houston, Texas)
- College: Florida (2007–2008); Texas (2009–2011)
- NBA draft: 2011: undrafted
- Playing career: 2011–2013
- Position: Point guard
- Coaching career: 2016–present

Career history

Playing
- 2011–2012: BK Valmiera
- 2012–2013: Idaho Stampede
- 2013: Sioux Falls Skyforce
- 2013: Canton Charge

Coaching
- 2016–2020: Texas (assistant)
- 2020–2022: Kentucky (assistant)
- 2022–2023: Duke (assistant)
- 2023–2025: Duke (associate HC)
- 2025–present: Miami (FL)

Career highlights
- Second-team Parade All-American (2007); McDonald's All-American (2007)

Jai Powell Lucas (born December 5, 1988) is an American basketball coach and former player. He is the head coach of the Miami Hurricanes men’s basketball team. He played college basketball for the Florida Gators and Texas Longhorns.

== Playing career ==
As a 5’10” point guard in the Houston suburb of Bellaire, Lucas was a McDonald's All American and was rated 20th by ESPN in the high school class of 2007. Lucas was initially recruited to play for the University of Florida. Lucas averaged 8.5 points and 2.3 assists per game during his freshman year. Prior to his second season with the Gators, Lucas announced he would transfer and, as per NCAA rules at the time, would sit out the 2008–09 season. A month later, he announced he would next play for the University of Texas. He played two seasons for the Longhorns, averaging about 3 points and 1 assist per game.

Lucas's pro career lasted from 2011 and 2013 and included one season with BK Valmiera, then stints in the G League with the Idaho Stampede, the Sioux Falls Skyforce, and the Canton Charge.

== Coaching ==
In August 2013, almost immediately after leaving his last pro team, the Texas Longhorns hired Lucas as an assistant coach on the staff of Rick Barnes. Lucas assisted in all internal operations of the basketball program. Lucas was retained by Barnes' successor, Shaka Smart, in 2015.

Lucas was hired by John Calipari in 2020 to be a special assistant and lead recruiter at the University of Kentucky. During the 2021–22 season at Kentucky, Lucas was rated the second best recruiter in the country, behind only Jon Scheyer, who was the associate head coach at Duke.

After Scheyer took over as the Duke head coach at the end of the 2021–22 season, he hired Lucas as an assistant coach, the first Duke assistant who hadn't played for the Blue Devils in 30 years.

On March 6, 2025, Lucas was named head coach of the Miami Hurricanes.

Entering his first season, Lucas inherited a Miami Hurricanes program following the retirement of longtime head coach Jim Larrañaga, who led the team for 13 years. Under Larrañaga, the Hurricanes established a stable and competitive foundation, highlighted by an Elite Eight appearance in 2021 and a Final Four run in 2022. However, the program regressed in 2023, finishing with a 15–17 record.

At the time of his retirement, Larrañaga cited the impact of the transfer portal as a contributing factor to the team’s decline. In his announcement, he stated that multiple players entered the portal shortly after the Final Four run, describing the growing influence of financial opportunities in college basketball and expressing concern that the sport had become increasingly professionalized. He remarked, “What shocked me beyond belief was after we made it to the Final Four … eight of them decided they were going to put their name in the portal and leave … the opportunity to make money someplace else … it’s become professional.”

Upon Lucas’s arrival, he emphasized the role of Miami’s name, image, and likeness (NIL) resources, noting that the program’s collective was prepared to invest in basketball. In his first season, he engineered a significant turnaround, as Miami improved from a 7–24 record the previous year to 24–7 in the regular season.

In the ACC Tournament, Miami defeated No. 24 Louisville in the opening round before losing to Virginia, 84–62. Despite the loss, the Hurricanes received an at-large bid to the 2026 NCAA Tournament, marking Lucas’s first tournament appearance as a head coach. Miami defeated No. 10 seed Missouri, 80–66, in the first round before falling to No. 2 seed Purdue, 79–69, in the round of 32. After Lucas's first year, Miami finished #24 in the AP poll with a 26-9 record.

The team’s one-year improvement drew widespread attention, and Lucas received multiple honors, including the Joe B. Hall Award, given annually to the top first-year head coach, and the Clarence “Big House” Gaines Award.

== Family ==
Lucas is from a well-known basketball family. His father, John Lucas II, was an All-American at Maryland who went on to a 14-year career in the NBA and was later head coach of three NBA teams. His older brother, John Lucas III, was a star at Baylor and Oklahoma State who played two seasons for the Houston Rockets, then continued his career in Italy, and most recently played for the Minnesota Timberwolves.

== Head coaching record ==
Record table
Season	Team	Overall	Conference	Standing	Postseason
Miami Hurricanes (Atlantic Coast Conference) (2025–present)
2025–26	Miami	26–9	13–5	3rd	NCAA Division I Round of 32
2026–27	Miami	5–1	0–0		
Miami (FL):		31–10 (.756)	13–5 (.722)		
Total:		31–10 (.756)			
National champion Postseason invitational champion Conference regular season champion Conference regular season and conference tournament champion Division regular season champion Division regular season and conference tournament champion Conference tournament champion
