= Shelton Henderson =

American basketball player

No. 7 – Miami Hurricanes
- Position: Small forward
- League: Atlantic Coast Conference

Personal information
- Listed height: 6 ft 6 in (1.98 m)
- Listed weight: 240 lb (109 kg)

Career information
- High school: Bellaire (Bellaire, Texas)
- College: Miami (Florida) (2025–present)

Shelton Henderson is an American college basketball player for the Miami Hurricanes of the Atlantic Coast Conference (ACC).

== Early life and high school career ==
Henderson attended Bellaire High School in Bellaire, Texas. As a junior, he averaged 21.6 points, 7.6 rebounds, 3.9 assists, 2.9 steals, and 1.4 blocks per game before announcing his commitment to Duke. As a senior, he averaged 22.3 points and 7.5 rebounds per game and was named the recipient of the 2025 Guy V. Lewis Award, given annually to the top boys' basketball player in the Greater Houston area. Following the conclusion of his high school career, Henderson decommitted from Duke and was released from his National Letter of Intent. Shortly after his decommitment, he committed to play college basketball for the University of Miami, following Jai Lucas, who had recruited him at Duke and had recently been hired as Miami's head coach.

== College career ==
As a true freshman, Henderson earned immediate playing time and emerged as one of the Hurricanes’ leading scorers. In a game against FIU, he scored 30 points and led Miami to a 98–81 victory. Following his performance, Henderson was named Freshman of the Week by CBS Sports.
