= Charlton Young =

American basketball coach

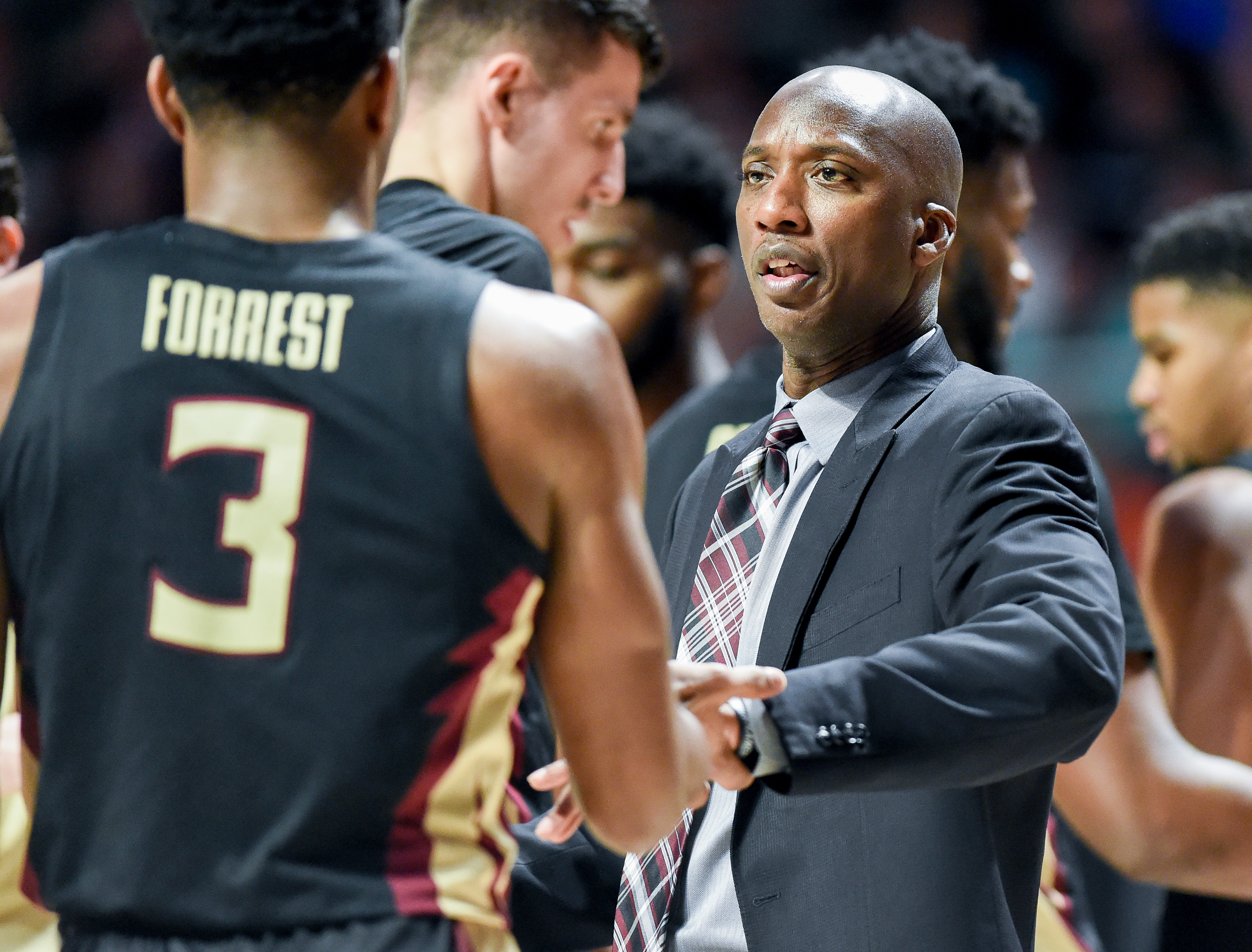
- Young (right) in 2020

Current position
- Title: Associate Head Coach
- Team: Miami
- Conference: ACC

Biographical details
- Born: August 15, 1971 (age 55); Miami, Florida, U.S.

Playing career
- 1989–1993: Georgia Southern
- Position: Point guard

Coaching career (HC unless noted)
- 1996–1997: Auburn (asst.)
- 1997–1999: Jacksonville (asst.)
- 1999–2000: Northeastern (asst.)
- 2000–2004: Auburn (asst.)
- 2004–2005: Chattanooga (assoc.)
- 2005–2009: Georgia Tech (asst.)
- 2009–2013: Georgia Southern
- 2013–2022: Florida State (asst.)
- 2022–2025: Missouri (assoc.)
- 2025–present: Miami (assoc.)

Head coaching record
- Overall: 43–84 (.339)

Accomplishments and honors

Awards
- TAAC Tournament MVP (1992)

Charlton Young (born August 15, 1971) is an American college basketball assistant coach at University of Miami and the former head coach of the Georgia Southern University Eagles men's basketball team, located in Statesboro, Georgia. He was the head coach of the Eagles from 2009–2013 and was the twelfth coach in the history of the program, replacing Jeff Price. The Eagles were collectively and individually successful during his four seasons as the head coach at the Statesboro, Georgia school. He led the Eagles to a second-place finish in the Southern Conference standings in 2012 as the team earned the second-best turnaround in league history. For his efforts he was honored as the Southern Conference Coach of the Year by multiple publications (including rushthecourt.net) and was a finalist for the Ben Jobe Award which is presented annually to the top Division I minority head coach. Young coached four All-Southern Conference selections including Willie Powers (all-conference third team in 2010) and Eric Ferguson (all-conference first team in 2013, all-conference first-team and All-Southern Conference Tournament team in 2012 and the All-Freshman team in 2011). The selections of Powers and Ferguson to the all-conference team in 2013 marked the first time since 2007 that multiple Georgia Southern players had earned all-conference accolades in the same season. In 2013, he led the Eagles to a victory over Virginia Tech for the first win in program history over a team from the ACC.

Born in Miami, Florida, Charlton played basketball at Georgia Southern from 1989 to 1993, leading the Eagles to the 1992 NCAA Tournament, where they lost to Oklahoma State; as of the 2025–26 season, 1992 is the Eagles most recent appearance in the NCAA Tournament.

He played professionally in Tours, France for one season (1993–94) after his college career ended. Upon his return to the United States, he began coaching, beginning as an administrative assistant at Auburn University.

== Head coaching record ==
Record table
Season	Team	Overall	Conference	Standing	Postseason
Georgia Southern Eagles (Southern Conference) (2009–2013)
2009–10	Georgia Southern	9–23	6–12	6th (South)	
2010–11	Georgia Southern	5–27	1–17	6th (South)	
2011–12	Georgia Southern	15–15	12–6	T–2nd (South)	
2012–13	Georgia Southern	14–19	7–11	10th	
Georgia Southern:		43–84 (.339)	26–46 (.361)		
Total:		43–84 (.339)	26–46 (.361)		
National champion Postseason invitational champion Conference regular season champion Conference regular season and conference tournament champion Division regular season champion Division regular season and conference tournament champion Conference tournament champion
