= 2026 ACC men's basketball tournament =

American college basketball competition

- Classification: Division I
- Season: 2025–26
- Teams: 15
- Site: Spectrum Center; Charlotte, North Carolina
- Champions: Duke (24th title)
- Winning coach: Jon Scheyer (3rd title)
- MVP: Cameron Boozer (Duke)
- Television: ACCN, ESPN Networks

2025–26 ACC men's basketball standings
	Conf.				Overall
Team	W		L	PCT	W		L	PCT
No. 1 Duke †	17	–	1	.944	35	–	3	.921
No. 9 Virginia	15	–	3	.833	30	–	6	.833
No. 25 Miami (FL)	13	–	5	.722	26	–	9	.743
No. 21 North Carolina	12	–	6	.667	24	–	9	.727
Clemson	12	–	6	.667	24	–	11	.686
No. 23т Louisville	11	–	7	.611	24	–	11	.686
NC State	10	–	8	.556	20	–	14	.588
Florida State	10	–	8	.556	18	–	15	.545
California	9	–	9	.500	22	–	12	.647
Stanford	9	–	9	.500	20	–	12	.625
SMU	8	–	10	.444	20	–	14	.588
Virginia Tech	8	–	10	.444	19	–	13	.594
Wake Forest	7	–	11	.389	18	–	17	.514
Syracuse	6	–	12	.333	15	–	17	.469
Pittsburgh	5	–	13	.278	13	–	20	.394
Notre Dame	4	–	14	.222	13	–	17	.433
Boston College	4	–	14	.222	11	–	20	.355
Georgia Tech	2	–	16	.111	11	–	20	.355
† 2026 ACC tournament winner As of March 29, 2026; Rankings from AP Poll

The 2026 ACC men's basketball tournament was the postseason men's basketball tournament for the Atlantic Coast Conference, held at the Spectrum Center in Charlotte, North Carolina, from March 10–14, 2026. It was the seventy-third edition of the tournament and fifteenth edition held in Charlotte. The tournament was sponsored by T. Rowe Price.

The Duke Blue Devils were the reigning tournament champions. Duke repeated as champions, receiving the conference's automatic bid to the 2026 NCAA Division I men's basketball tournament.

== Seeding and qualification ==
Fifteen of the eighteen ACC men's basketball participated in the tournament. Teams were seeded by record within the conference, with a tiebreaker system to seed teams with identical conference records.

Seed	School	Conference Record	Tiebreakers
1	Duke	17–1	
2	Virginia	15–3	
3	Miami (FL)	13–5	
4	North Carolina	12–6	1–0 vs. Clemson
5	Clemson	12–6	0–1 vs. North Carolina
6	Louisville	11–7	
7	NC State	10–8	1–0 vs. Florida State
8	Florida State	10–8	0–1 vs. NC State
9	California	9–9	2–0 vs. Stanford
10	Stanford	9–9	0–2 vs. California
11	SMU	8–10	1–0 vs. Virginia Tech
12	Virginia Tech	8–10	0–1 vs. SMU
13	Wake Forest	7–11	
14	Syracuse	6–12	
15	Pittsburgh	5–13	
DNQ	Notre Dame	4–14	1–0 vs. NC State
DNQ	Boston College	4–14	0–1 vs. NC State
DNQ	Georgia Tech	2–16	

== Schedule ==
Session	Game	Time	Matchup	Score	Television	Attendance
First round – Tuesday, March 10
Opening day	1	2:00 p.m.	No. 10 Stanford vs. No. 15 Pittsburgh	63–64	ACCN	6,593
Opening day	2	4:30 p.m.	No. 11 SMU vs. No. 14 Syracuse	86–69	ACCN	6,593
Opening day	3	7:00 p.m.	No. 12 Virginia Tech vs. No. 13 Wake Forest	89–95^{OT}	ACCN	6,593
Second round – Wednesday, March 11
1	4	Noon	No. 7 NC State vs. No. 15 Pittsburgh	98–88	ESPN2	8,116
1	5	2:45 p.m.	No. 6 Louisville vs. No. 11 SMU	62–58	ESPN	8,116
2	6	7:00 p.m.	No. 8 Florida State vs. No. 9 California	95–89	ESPN2	9,620
2	7	9:30 p.m.	No. 5 Clemson vs. No. 13 Wake Forest	71–62	ESPN2	9,620
Quarterfinals – Thursday, March 12
3	8	Noon	No. 2 Virginia vs. No. 7 NC State	81–74	ESPN2	11,722
3	9	2:30 p.m.	No. 3 Miami (FL) vs. No. 6 Louisville	78–73	ESPN2	11,722
4	10	7:00 p.m.	No. 1 Duke vs. No. 8 Florida State	80–79	ESPN	17,627
4	11	9:30 p.m.	No. 4 North Carolina vs. No. 5 Clemson	79–80	ESPN	17,627
Semifinals – Friday, March 13
5	12	7:00 p.m.	No. 2 Virginia vs. No. 3 Miami (FL)	84–62	ESPN2	17,711
5	13	9:30 p.m.	No. 1 Duke vs. No. 5 Clemson	73–61	ESPN2	17,711
Championship – Saturday, March 14
6	14	8:30 p.m.	No. 1 Duke vs. No. 2 Virginia	74–70	ESPN	17,781
Game times in EDT. Rankings denote tournament seed.

== Bracket ==
First round Tuesday, March 10
12	Virginia Tech	89
13	Wake Forest	95*
10	Stanford	63
15	Pittsburgh	64
11	SMU	86
14	Syracuse	69

Second round Wednesday, March 11
8	Florida State	95
9	California	89
5	Clemson	71
13	Wake Forest	62
7	NC State	98
15	Pittsburgh	88
6	Louisville	62
11	SMU	58

Quarterfinals; Thursday, March 12
1	Duke	80
8	Florida State	79
4	North Carolina	79
5	Clemson	80
2	Virginia	81
7	NC State	74
3	Miami	78
6	Louisville	73

Semifinals; Friday, March 13
1	Duke	73
5	Clemson	61
2	Virginia	84
3	Miami	62

Championship; Saturday, March 14
1	Duke	74
2	Virginia	70

== Game Summaries ==
=== First Round ===
ACCN

March 10
2:00 p.m.

Report

No. 10 Stanford 63, No. 15 Pittsburgh 64
Scoring by half: 23–31, 40–33
Pts: Okorie (14); Rebs: Rohosy (7); Asts: Cammann, Rohosy, Okorie, Young (2)	Pts: Dunning Jr. (16); Rebs: Dunning Jr. (8); Asts: Corhen, Minor, Witherspoon (2)

Spectrum Center
Charlotte, NC
Referees: Roger Ayers
Lee Cassell
Jerry Heater

ACCN

March 10
4:30 p.m.

Report

No. 11 SMU 86, No. 14 Syracuse 69
Scoring by half: 39–38, 47–31
Pts: Miller (25); Rebs: Toombs, Yiğitoğlu (11); Asts: Toombs (6)	Pts: Kingz (25); Rebs: Betsey (7); Asts: George (11)

Spectrum Center
Charlotte, NC
Referees: Clarence Armstrong
Ron Groover
Kellen Miliner

ACCN

March 10
7:00 p.m.

Report

No. 12 Virginia Tech 89, No. 13 Wake Forest 95 (OT)
Scoring by half: 34–38, 41–37 Overtime: 14–20
Pts: Hammond (23); Rebs: Lawal (9); Asts: Bedford, Dorn, Schutt (3)	Pts: Colvin (18); Rebs: Colvin (6); Asts: Mason (4)

Spectrum Center
Charlotte, NC
Attendance: 6,593
Referees: Bert Smith
AJ Desai
Isaac Barnett

=== Second round ===
ESPN2

March 11
Noon

Report

No. 7 NC State 98, No. 15 Pittsburgh 88
Scoring by half: 51–50, 47–38
Pts: Copeland (24); Rebs: Lubin (5); Asts: Copeland (8)	Pts: Corhen (27); Rebs: Corhen (7); Asts: Indrušaitis (6)

Spectrum Center
Charlotte, NC
Referees: Ron Groover
Clarence Armstrong
Justin Porterfield

ESPN

March 11
2:30 p.m.

Report

No. 6 Louisville 62, No. 11 SMU 58
Scoring by half: 26–26, 36–32
Pts: Conwell (16); Rebs: McKneely (7); Asts: McKneely (5)	Pts: Pierre Jr. (17); Rebs: Toombs (9); Asts: Miller (4)

Spectrum Center
Charlotte, NC
Attendance: 8,116
Referees: Bert Smith
Lee Cassell
Jemel Spearman

ESPN2

March 11
7:00 p.m.

Report

No. 8 Florida State 95, No. 9 California 89
Scoring by half: 46–32, 49–57
Pts: McCray V (30); Rebs: Steen (8); Asts: McCray V (8)	Pts: Ames (27); Rebs: Dort (18); Asts: Pippen (6)

Spectrum Center
Charlotte, NC
Referees: Bill Covington Jr.
AJ Desai
Tony Henderson

ESPN2

March 11
9:30 p.m.

Report

No. 5 Clemson 71, No. 13 Wake Forest 62
Scoring by half: 41–23, 30–39
Pts: Godfrey (11); Rebs: Godfrey (8); Asts: Buckner, Johnson (3)	Pts: Harris (22); Rebs: Spillers (12); Asts: Harris (4)

Spectrum Center
Charlotte, NC
Attendance: 9,620
Referees: Mark Schnur
Roger Ayers
Tommy Morrissey

=== Quarterfinals ===
ESPN2

March 12
Noon

Report

No. 2 Virginia 81, No. 7 NC State 74
Scoring by half: 33–32, 48–42
Pts: Thomas (16); Rebs: Onyenso (6); Asts: Hall (5)	Pts: McNeil Jr. (26); Rebs: Lubin (10); Asts: Copeland (6)

Spectrum Center
Charlotte, NC
Referees: Lee Cassell
AJ Desai
Jemel Spearman

ESPN2

March 12
2:30 p.m.

Report

No. 3 Miami (FL) 78, No. 6 Louisville 73
Scoring by half: 37–38, 41–35
Pts: Reneau (24); Rebs: Udeh Jr. (9); Asts: Donaldson (6)	Pts: Conwell (22); Rebs: Conwell (9); Asts: Wooley (4)

Spectrum Center
Charlotte, NC
Attendance: 11,722
Referees: Roger Ayers
Clarence Armstrong
Mark Schnur

ESPN

March 12
7:00 p.m.

Report

No. 1 Duke 80, No. 8 Florida State 79
Scoring by half: 44–43, 35–37
Pts: Evans (32); Rebs: Brown (12); Asts: Boozer (4)	Pts: Jones (28); Rebs: Steen (8); Asts: McCray (4)

Spectrum Center
Charlotte, NC
Referees: Ron Groover
Justin Porterfield
Tommy Morrissey

ESPN

March 12
9:30 p.m.

Report

No. 4 North Carolina 79, No. 5 Clemson 80
Scoring by half: 31–39, 48–41
Pts: Veesaar (28); Rebs: Veesaar (17); Asts: Trimble (8)	Pts: Davidson (17); Rebs: Davidson (11); Asts: Buckner, Hunter (3)

Spectrum Center
Charlotte, NC
Attendance: 17,627
Referees: Bert Smith
Bill Covington
Tony Henderson

=== Semifinals ===
ESPN2

March 13
7:00 p.m.

Report

No. 2 Virginia 84, No. 3 Miami (FL) 62
Scoring by half: 38–23, 46–39
Pts: Onyenso (17); Rebs: De Ridder (6); Asts: Mallory (6)	Pts: Washington (13); Rebs: Reneau (6); Asts: Allen, Donaldson (2)

Spectrum Center
Charlotte, NC
Referees: Bill Covington, Jr.
Tommy Morrissey
Tony Henderson

ESPN2

March 13
9:30 p.m.

Report

No. 1 Duke 73, No. 5 Clemson 61
Scoring by half: 41–22, 32–39
Pts: Cam. Boozer (24); Rebs: Cam. Boozer (14); Asts: Cam. Boozer (5)	Pts: Godfrey (18); Rebs: Godfrey (6); Asts: Hunter (4)

Spectrum Center
Charlotte, NC
Attendance: 17,711
Referees: Lee Cassell
Clarence Armstrong
AJ Desai

=== Final ===
ESPN

March 14
8:30 p.m.

Report

No. 2 Virginia 70, No. 1 Duke 74
Scoring by half: 36–38, 34–36
Pts: Thomas (18); Rebs: Onyenso (8); Asts: Mallory (4)	Pts: Evans (20); Rebs: Cam. Boozer (8); Asts: Cam. Boozer (8)

Spectrum Center
Charlotte, NC
Attendance: 17,781
Referees: Roger Ayers
Ron Groover
Bert Smith

== Awards and honors ==
**2026 ACC Men's Basketball All-Tournament Teams**
First Team	Second Team
**Cameron Boozer** – Duke; Isaiah Evans – Duke; Sam Lewis – Virginia; Robert McCray V – Florida State; Ugonna Onyenso – Virginia	Cayden Boozer – Duke; Lajae Jones – Florida State; Henri Veesaar – North Carolina; Malik Thomas – Virginia; Thijs De Ridder – Virginia

MVP in bold
