= 2026–27 SMU Mustangs men's basketball team =

American college basketball season

2026–27 SMU Mustangs men's basketball
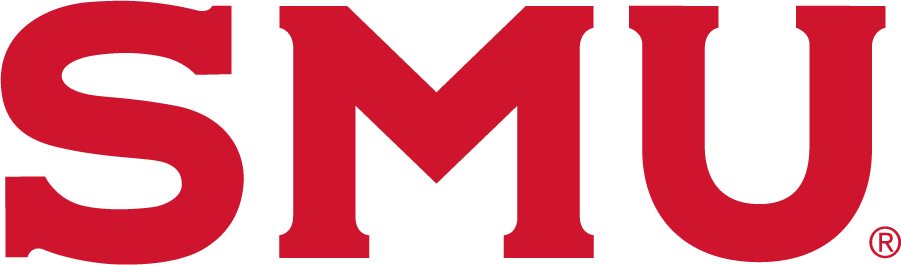
- Conference: Atlantic Coast Conference
- Record: 6–0 (0–0 ACC)
- Head coach: Andy Enfield (3rd season)
- Associate head coach: Dana Ford
- Assistant coaches: Jason Hart; Jay Morris; Kurt Karis; Eric Mobley
- Home arena: Moody Coliseum

2026–27 ACC men's basketball standings
	Conf.				Overall
Team	W		L	PCT	W		L	PCT
No. 4 Virginia	0	–	0	–	7	–	0	1.000
Pittsburgh	0	–	0	–	6	–	0	1.000
SMU	0	–	0	–	6	–	0	1.000
Virginia Tech	0	–	0	–	6	–	0	1.000
Boston College	0	–	0	–	5	–	0	1.000
Notre Dame	0	–	0	–	6	–	1	.857
Florida State	0	–	0	–	5	–	1	.833
Georgia Tech	0	–	0	–	5	–	1	.833
No. 17 Miami (FL)	0	–	0	–	5	–	1	.833
NC State	0	–	0	–	5	–	1	.833
Stanford	0	–	0	–	5	–	1	.833
Wake Forest	0	–	0	–	5	–	1	.833
Clemson	0	–	0	–	4	–	1	.800
North Carolina	0	–	0	–	4	–	1	.800
No. 23 Louisville	0	–	0	–	3	–	1	.750
California	0	–	0	–	4	–	2	.667
No. 5 Duke	0	–	0	–	4	–	2	.667
Syracuse	0	–	0	–	4	–	2	.667
† 2027 ACC tournament winner As of November 22, 2026; Rankings from AP poll

The 2026–27 SMU Mustangs men's basketball team represents Southern Methodist University during the 2026–27 NCAA Division I men's basketball season. The Mustangs, led by third-year head coach Andy Enfield, play their home games at Moody Coliseum on their campus in University Park, Texas (Note: University Park and its neighbor of Highland Park form an enclave within Dallas known as the Park Cities. All locations within the Park Cities have a Dallas mailing address.) as third-year members of the Atlantic Coast Conference (ACC).

SMU entered the season with a heavily rebuilt roster after ten players from the 2025–26 team, including all five regular starters, departed. Three players began professional careers: Jaron Pierre Jr. was selected 58th overall by the New Orleans Pelicans in the 2026 NBA draft, while Boopie Miller and B. J. Edwards signed free-agent deals with the Milwaukee Bucks and Sacramento Kings, respectively. The Mustangs added eight transfers in a class ranked 21st nationally by On3. Enfield also hired former NBA player Jason Hart as associate head coach, replacing Chris Capko. The team traveled to Italy for an exhibition series in August.

The Mustangs opened the season with an 85–72 win over Southern on November 2, led by 24 points from freshman Jakub Szumert.

== Previous season ==
The Mustangs finished the season 20–14 and 8–10 in ACC play to finish in a tie for eleventh place. As the eleventh seed in the 2026 ACC tournament, they defeated Syracuse in the First Round before losing to sixth seed and twenty-fourth ranked Louisville 62–58 in the Second Round. They received an at-large bid to the NCAA tournament, the program's first since 2017, as an eleven seed in the Midwest regional. They lost to fellow eleven seed Miami (OH) 89–79 in the First Four to end their season.

== Offseason ==
=== Departures ===
Departures
Name	Number	Pos.	Height	Weight	Year	Hometown	Reason for departure
B. J. Edwards	0	G	6'3"	200	Senior	Knoxville, Tennessee	Graduated, signed with the Sacramento Kings
Chance Puryear	1	F	6'7"	210	(redshirt) Freshman	Dallas, Texas	Entered transfer portal
Boopie Miller	2	G	6'0"	175	Senior	Chicago, Illinois	Graduated, signed with the Milwaukee Bucks
Corey Washington	3	F	6'6"	190	Senior	Little Rock, Arkansas	Graduated
Sam Walters	4	F	6'9"	230	Junior	The Villages, Florida	Transferred to Troy
Jaron Pierre Jr.	5	G	6'5"	210	Senior	New Orleans, Louisiana	Graduated, drafted 58th overall in the 2026 NBA draft
B.J. Davis-Ray	9	G	6'6"	195	Freshman	St. Louis, Missouri	Entered transfer portal
Mitchell Holmes	13	F	6'10"	230	(redshirt) Freshman	Fort Worth, Texas	Entered transfer portal
Samet Yiğitoğlu	24	C	7'2"	270	Sophomore	Istanbul, Turkey	Transferred to Indiana
Trey Utter	31	G	6'0"	175	Senior	Argyle, Texas	Graduated

=== Incoming transfers ===
Incoming transfers
Name	Number	Pos.	Height	Weight	Year	Hometown	Previous school
Rowan Brumbaugh	0	G	6'4"	185	Graduate Student	Washington, D.C.	Tulane
Jacob Patrick	2	G	6'6"	195	Senior	Ludwigsburg, Germany	Utah
Jaylin Stewart	3	F	6'7"	225	Senior	Seattle, Washington	UConn
David Terrell Jr.	5	G	6'4"	195	Senior	Dallas, Texas	North Texas
Oziyah Sellers	6	G	6'5"	190	Graduate Student	Hayward, California	St. John's
Gehrig Normand	9	G	6'6"	190	Senior	North Richland Hills, Texas	Santa Clara
Nic Codie	10	F	6'8"	220	Junior	Dallas, Texas	Texas
Johan Munch	24	F	6'11"	225	Junior	Copenhagen, Denmark	Oregon State

=== 2026 Recruiting class ===
College recruiting
Name	Hometown	School	Height	Weight	Commit date
Cameron Lomax; G	Frisco, Texas	Frisco Heritage	6 ft 1 in (1.85 m)	170 lb (77 kg)	
Cameron Lomax; G	Recruit ratings: 247Sports:				
Overall recruit ranking:
Note: In many cases, Scout, Rivals, 247Sports, On3, and ESPN may conflict in their listings of height and weight.; In these cases, the average was taken. ESPN grades are on a 100-point scale.; Sources: "SMU 2026 Basketball Commitments". Rivals.; "2026 SMU Mustangs Recruiting Class". ESPN.; "2026 Team Ranking". Rivals.; "2026 SMU Mustangs Basketball 24/7 Sports Commits". 247Sports.

SMU also added forward Jakub Szumert, a freshman from Warsaw, Poland, who previously played professionally for Zastal Zielona Góra.

== Roster ==
2026–27 SMU Mustangs men's basketball team
Players
Coaches

Pos.	#	Name	Height	Weight	Year	Previous school	Hometown
G	0	Rowan Brumbaugh	6 ft 4 in (1.93 m)	185 lb (84 kg)	GS	Northfield Mount Hermon; Tulane	Washington, D.C.
F	1	Jaden Toombs	6 ft 10 in (2.08 m)	230 lb (104 kg)	So	Dynamic Prep	Amarillo, TX
G	2	Jacob Patrick	6 ft 6 in (1.98 m)	195 lb (88 kg)	Sr	Otto-Hahn Gymnasium Ludwigsburg; Utah	Ludwigsburg, Germany
F	3	Jaylin Stewart	6 ft 7 in (2.01 m)	225 lb (102 kg)	Sr	Garfield; UConn	Seattle, WA
F	4	Billy White III	6 ft 8 in (2.03 m)	195 lb (88 kg)	RS Fr	Veterans Memorial	Corpus Christi, TX
G	5	David Terrell Jr.	6 ft 4 in (1.93 m)	195 lb (88 kg)	Sr	Mansfield Summit; North Texas	Dallas, TX
G	6	Oziyah Sellers	6 ft 5 in (1.96 m)	190 lb (86 kg)	GS	Southern California Academy; St. John's	Hayward, CA
F	7	Jermaine O'Neal Jr.	6 ft 5 in (1.96 m)	185 lb (84 kg)	So	Dynamic Prep	Southlake, TX
G	8	Cameron Lomax	6 ft 1 in (1.85 m)	170 lb (77 kg)	Fr	Frisco Heritage	Frisco, TX
G	9	Gehrig Normand	6 ft 6 in (1.98 m)	190 lb (86 kg)	Sr	Birdville; Santa Clara	North Richland Hills, TX
F	10	Nic Codie	6 ft 8 in (2.03 m)	220 lb (100 kg)	Jr	Newman Smith; Texas	Dallas, TX
F	13	Jakub Szumert	6 ft 9 in (2.06 m)	210 lb (95 kg)	Fr	Zastal Zielona Góra	Warsaw, Poland
F	22	Nigel Walls	6 ft 10 in (2.08 m)	200 lb (91 kg)	So	St. Francis Episcopal	Houston, TX
F	24	Johan Munch	6 ft 11 in (2.11 m)	225 lb (102 kg)	Jr	Orangeville Prep; Oregon State	Copenhagen, Denmark
G	33	Niccolo Kalischer-Stork	6 ft 2 in (1.88 m)	205 lb (93 kg)	Jr	Harvard-Westlake	Los Angeles, CA

Head coach

- Andy Enfield (Johns Hopkins)

Assistant coach(es)

- Dana Ford (Illinois State)
- Jason Hart (Syracuse)
- Jay Morris (Concordia)
- Kurt Karis (USC)
- Eric Mobley (Portland)

Legend

- (C) Team captain
- (S) Suspended
- (I) Ineligible
- (W) Walk-on
- Injured
- Current redshirt

Roster
Last update: November 4, 2026

== Schedule and results ==
Date time, TV	Rank^{#}	Opponent^{#}	Result	Record	High points	High rebounds	High assists	Site (attendance) city, state
Exhibition
October 25, 2026*; 1:00 p.m.		Texas A&M	W 94–88	—	22 – Lomax	9 – Szumert	2 – Tied	Moody Coliseum (4,759); Dallas, TX
Non-conference regular season
November 2, 2026*; 7:00 p.m., ACCNX		Southern	W 85–72	1–0	24 – Szumert	8 – Toombs	7 – Toombs	Moody Coliseum (4,236); Dallas, TX
November 5, 2026*; 7:00 p.m., ACCNX		VMI	W 95–70	2–0	21 – Sellers	6 – Munch	6 – Terrell Jr.	Moody Coliseum (3,763); Dallas, TX
November 10, 2026*; 7:00 p.m., ACCNX		Prairie View A&M	W 98–63	3–0	18 – Toombs	9 – Toombs	6 – Terrell Jr.	Moody Coliseum (3,758); Dallas, TX
November 13, 2026*; 8:00 p.m., ACCN		Ball State	W 90–65	4–0	21 – Sellers	9 – Szumert	7 – Terrell Jr.	Moody Coliseum (4,011); Dallas, TX
November 17, 2026*; 7:00 p.m., ACCNX		Oral Roberts	W 76–72	5–0	23 – White III	5 – Tied	14 – Terrell Jr.	Moody Coliseum (3,813); Dallas, TX
November 20, 2026*; 7:00 p.m., ACCNX		South Alabama	W 101–55	6–0	17 – Sellers	11 – Toombs	7 – Brumbaugh	Moody Coliseum (3,663); Dallas, TX
November 25, 2026*; 6:00 p.m., CBSSN		vs. Utah State; Acrisure Series Thanksgiving Event						Acrisure Arena; Palm Desert, CA
November 26, 2026*; 6:00 p.m., CBSSN		vs. LSU; Acrisure Series Thanksgiving Event						Acrisure Arena; Palm Desert, CA
December 1, 2026*; 7:00 p.m., ACCNX		Stephen F. Austin						Moody Coliseum; Dallas, TX
December 5, 2026*; 4:30 p.m., TNT		at DePaul						Wintrust Arena; Chicago, IL
December 8, 2026*; 7:00 p.m., ACCNX		UTSA						Moody Coliseum; Dallas, TX
December 12, 2026*; 12:30 p.m., The CW		vs. Minnesota; Dallas Duel						Comerica Center; Frisco, TX
December 19, 2026*; 2:30 p.m., The CW		vs. UNLV; Hall of Fame Series Phoenix						Mortgage Matchup Center; Phoenix, AZ
December 22, 2026*; 7:30 p.m., ESPNU		Oklahoma						Moody Coliseum; Dallas, TX
ACC regular season
January 2, 2027; 5:00 p.m., ESPN/ESPN2		at Virginia						John Paul Jones Arena; Charlottesville, VA
January 5, 2027; 6:00 p.m., ESPNU		Wake Forest						Moody Coliseum; Dallas, TX
January 9, 2027; 1:15 p.m., The CW		Louisville						Moody Coliseum; Dallas, TX
January 12, 2027; 8:00 p.m., ACCN		at NC State						Lenovo Center; Raleigh, NC
January 16, 2027; 11:00 a.m., The CW		at Virginia Tech						Cassell Coliseum; Blacksburg, VA
January 23, 2027; 3:30 p.m., ACCN		Georgia Tech						Moody Coliseum; Dallas, TX
January 26, 2027; 6:00 p.m., ESPN/ESPN2		at North Carolina						Dean Smith Center; Chapel Hill, NC
January 30, 2027; 11:30 a.m., ACCN		at Notre Dame						Joyce Center; South Bend, IN
February 3, 2027; 7:00 p.m., The CW		California						Moody Coliseum; Dallas, TX
February 6, 2027; 7:00 p.m., ACCN		Stanford						Moody Coliseum; Dallas, TX
February 9, 2027; 8:00 p.m., ESPN		Duke						Moody Coliseum; Dallas, TX
February 13, 2027; 11:00 a.m., ESPN/ESPN2		at Louisville						KFC Yum! Center; Louisville, KY
February 16, 2027; 6:00 p.m., ACCN		at Boston College						Conte Forum; Chestnut Hill, MA
February 20, 2027; 1:15 p.m., The CW		Syracuse						Moody Coliseum; Dallas, TX
February 23, 2027; 9:00 p.m., ACCN		Clemson						Moody Coliseum; Dallas, TX
February 27, 2027; 11:00 a.m., The CW		at Georgia Tech						McCamish Pavilion; Atlanta, GA
March 2, 2027; 6:00 p.m., TBA		at Miami						Watsco Center; Coral Gables, FL
March 6, 2027; 5:00 p.m., ESPNU		Pittsburgh						Moody Coliseum; Dallas, TX
*Non-conference game. ^{#}Rankings from AP poll. (#) Tournament seedings in parentheses. All times are in Central Time.

== Awards and honors ==
Recipient	Award	Date	Ref.
Jaden Toombs	Kareem Abdul-Jabbar Award Watch List	October 30	
