= 2026–27 Syracuse Orange men's basketball team =

American college basketball season

2026–27 Syracuse Orange men's basketball
- Conference: Atlantic Coast Conference
- Record: 3–2 (0–0 ACC)
- Head coach: Gerry McNamara (1st season)
- Assistant coaches: Ben Lee; Jamal Brunt; Ryan Daly; Arinze Onuaku
- Home arena: JMA Wireless Dome

2026–27 ACC men's basketball standings
	Conf.				Overall
Team	W		L	PCT	W		L	PCT
No. 4 Virginia	0	–	0	–	6	–	0	1.000
Boston College	0	–	0	–	5	–	0	1.000
Georgia Tech	0	–	0	–	5	–	0	1.000
NC State	0	–	0	–	5	–	0	1.000
Pittsburgh	0	–	0	–	5	–	0	1.000
SMU	0	–	0	–	5	–	0	1.000
Virginia Tech	0	–	0	–	5	–	0	1.000
Notre Dame	0	–	0	–	6	–	1	.857
Stanford	0	–	0	–	5	–	1	.833
Clemson	0	–	0	–	4	–	1	.800
Florida State	0	–	0	–	4	–	1	.800
No. 17 Miami (FL)	0	–	0	–	4	–	1	.800
Wake Forest	0	–	0	–	4	–	1	.800
No. 23 Louisville	0	–	0	–	3	–	1	.750
North Carolina	0	–	0	–	3	–	1	.750
California	0	–	0	–	4	–	2	.667
No. 5 Duke	0	–	0	–	3	–	2	.600
Syracuse	0	–	0	–	3	–	2	.600
† 2027 ACC tournament winner As of November 20, 2026; Rankings from AP poll

The 2026–27 Syracuse Orange men's basketball team represented Syracuse University during the 2026–27 NCAA Division I men's basketball season. The Orange, led by first-year head coach Gerry McNamara, play their home games at JMA Wireless Dome in Syracuse, New York as 14th-year members of the Atlantic Coast Conference.

== Previous season ==
The Orange finished the 2025–26 season 15–17 and 6–12 in ACC play to finish in 14th place. In the ACC tournament, they lost to SMU in the first round.

On March 11, 2026, the school fired head coach Adrian Autry. On March 24, the school named former Orange player and Siena head coach Gerry McNamara the team's new head coach.

== Preseason ==
On October 13, 2026, the Atlantic Coast Conference released their preseason poll. Syracuse was picked to finish 11th in the conference.

=== Preseason rankings ===
ACC Preseason Poll
Place	Team	Points
1	Duke	861 (45)
2	Virginia	778 (1)
3	Louisville	758 (1)
4	Miami	753 (1)
5	North Carolina	658
6	Clemson	623
7	Florida State	519
8	NC State	502
9	Virginia Tech	489
10	SMU	443
11	Syracuse	353
12	Pittsburgh	323
13	Stanford	267
14	Wake Forest	234
15	California	225
16	Notre Dame	153
17	Boston College	150
18	Georgia Tech	119
(#) first-place votes

=== Preseason All-ACC Teams ===
No players were named to the Preseason All-ACC First or Second Team.

== Roster ==
2026–27 Syracuse Orange men's basketball team
Players
Coaches

Pos.	#	Name	Height	Weight	Year	Previous school	Hometown
G	0	Ryan Moesch	6 ft 0 in (1.83 m)	180 lb (82 kg)	Fr	Chittenango High School	Chittenango, New York
F	1	Sadiq White Jr.	6 ft 8 in (2.03 m)	207 lb (94 kg)	So	IMG Academy	Charlotte, North Carolina
G	2	Ethan Butler	6 ft 4 in (1.93 m)	210 lb (95 kg)	Fr	St. Francis Prep	Manhattan, New York
G	3	Garwey Dual	6 ft 5 in (1.96 m)	200 lb (91 kg)	Sr	McNeese	Houston, Texas
G	4	Gavin Doty	6 ft 5 in (1.96 m)	200 lb (91 kg)	Jr	Siena	Fulton, New York
F	5	Tasman Goodrick	6 ft 10 in (2.08 m)	240 lb (109 kg)	Sr	Siena	Sydney, Australia
G	6	Calvin Russell III	6 ft 5 in (1.96 m)	190 lb (86 kg)	So	Miami Northwestern Senior High School	Opa-locka, Florida
G	7	Kiyan Anthony	6 ft 5 in (1.96 m)	198 lb (90 kg)	So	Long Island Lutheran High School	Brooklyn, New York
F	8	Amarri Monroe (5th)	6 ft 7 in (2.01 m)	225 lb (102 kg)	Sr	Quinnipiac	Newburgh, New York
C	10	Abdramane Siby	7 ft 0 in (2.13 m)	220 lb (100 kg)	Fr	KK Mega Basket	Bamako, Mali
F	11	Francis Folefac	6 ft 7 in (2.01 m)	245 lb (111 kg)	So	Siena	Lanham, Maryland
F	12	Mark Morano	6 ft 6 in (1.98 m)	205 lb (93 kg)	Fr	KK Kansai Helios Domžale	Postojna, Slovenia
C	13	Iker Martinez	7 ft 0 in (2.13 m)	225 lb (102 kg)	Fr	Elev8 Academy	Torreón, Mexico
C	23	Luke Wilson	6 ft 10 in (2.08 m)	255 lb (116 kg)	Jr	Appalachian State	Augusta, Georgia
G	24	Noah Lobdell	6 ft 0 in (1.83 m)	150 lb (68 kg)	Jr	Faith Heritage School	Syracuse, New York
G	25	Aiden Tobiason	6 ft 6 in (1.98 m)	210 lb (95 kg)	Jr	Temple	Wilmington, Delaware

Head coach

- Gerry McNamara, 1st yr. (Syracuse, 2006)

Assistant coach(es)

- Ryan Daly, 1st yr. (Saint Joseph's, 2021)
- Arinze Onuaku, 1st yr. (Syracuse, 2010)
- Ben Lee, 1st yr. (Union (NY), 2019)
- Jamal Brunt, 1st yr. (Randolph–Macon, 2003)

Legend

- (C) Team captain
- (S) Suspended
- (I) Ineligible
- (W) Walk-on
- (5th) Fifth-year senior
- Injured
- Current redshirt

Roster
Last update: November 8, 2026

== Schedule ==
Date time, TV	Rank^{#}	Opponent^{#}	Result	Record	High points	High rebounds	High assists	Site (attendance) city, state
Exhibition
October 13, 2026*; 7:00 p.m., UConn+		vs. UConn; Rivalry / Hall of Fame Exhibition	L 52–72		17 – White Jr.	9 – Wilson	5 – Moesch	Mohegan Sun Arena; Uncasville, CT
October 18, 2026*; 7:00 p.m., ESPN+		at Siena	W 81–76		20 – Doty	8 – Tied	5 – Moesch	MVP Arena; Albany, NY
October 24, 2026*; 3:00 p.m., Cuse.com		vs. Niagara	W 71–58		14 – Doty	13 – Doty	6 – Moesch	KeyBank Center; Buffalo, NY
Regular season
November 2, 2026*; 7:00 p.m., ACCNX		New Haven	W 74–58	1–0	17 – Anthony	13 – Doty	5 – Moesch	JMA Wireless Dome (23,283); Syracuse, NY
November 5, 2026*; 7:00 p.m., ACCNX		Central Connecticut	W 102–49	2–0	18 – Doty	10 – White Jr.	7 – Moesch	JMA Wireless Dome (18,494); Syracuse, NY
November 9, 2026*; 6:30 p.m., FS1		vs. Indiana	L 80–83	2–1	19 – Moesch	7 – Doty	6 – Moesch	Gainbridge Fieldhouse (5,047); Indianapolis, IN
November 15, 2026*; 7:00 p.m., Peacock		at No. 13 St. John's	L 62–79	2–2	17 – Anthony	9 – Moesch	5 – Moesch	Madison Square Garden (16,431); New York, NY
*Non-conference game. ^{#}Rankings from AP poll. (#) Tournament seedings in parentheses. All times are in Eastern Time.
