= 2026–27 Georgia Tech Yellow Jackets men's basketball team =

American college basketball season

2026–27 Georgia Tech Yellow Jackets men's basketball
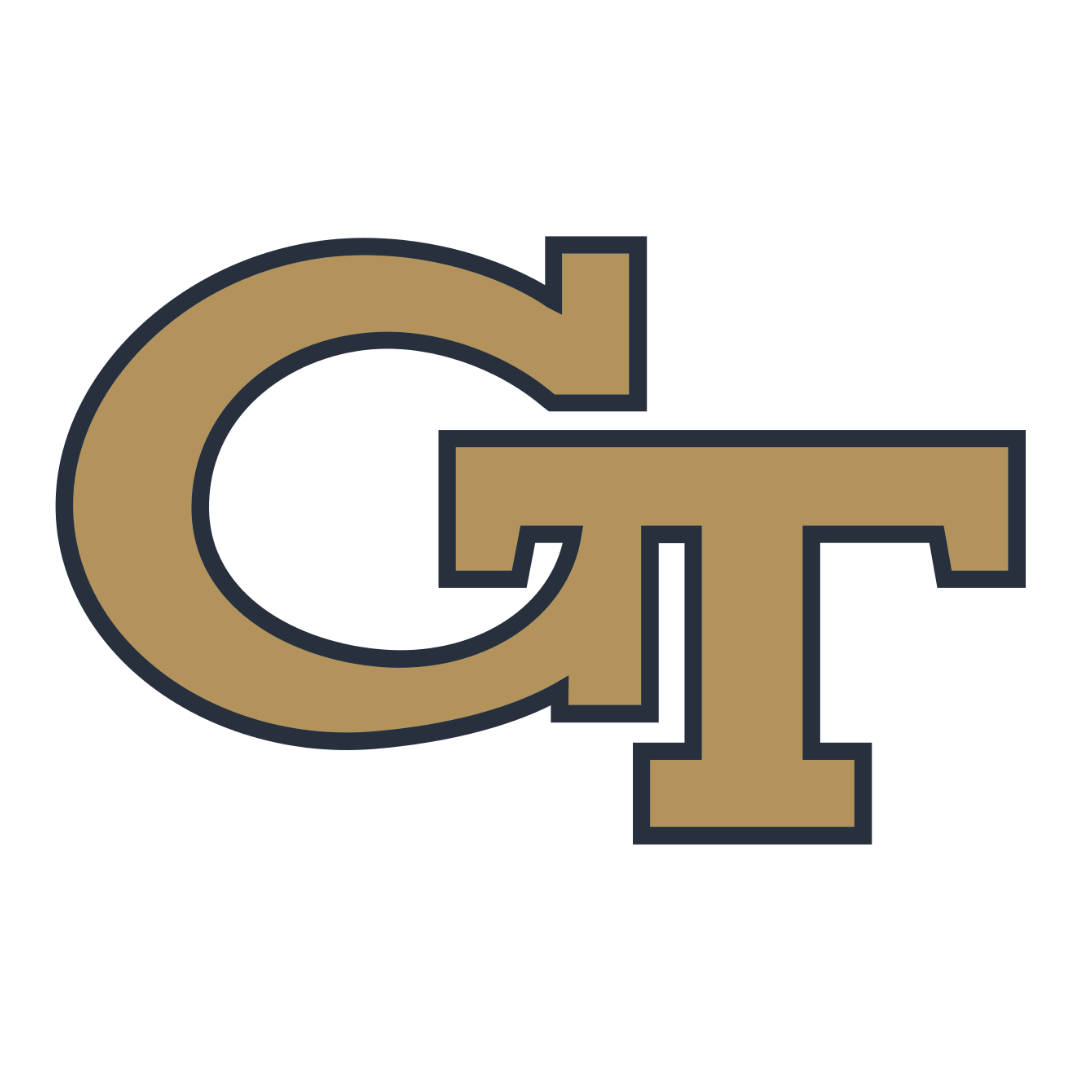
- Conference: Atlantic Coast Conference
- Record: 5–0 (0–0 ACC)
- Head coach: Scott Cross (1st season)
- Associate head coach: Wes Flanigan; Kenneth Mangrum (1st season)
- Assistant coaches: Brandon Gilbert (1st season); Kelvin Lewis (1st season); Chris Kreider (1st season); Matt Fraschilla (1st season)
- Home arena: McCamish Pavilion

2026–27 ACC men's basketball standings
	Conf.				Overall
Team	W		L	PCT	W		L	PCT
No. 4 Virginia	0	–	0	–	5	–	0	1.000
Virginia Tech	0	–	0	–	5	–	0	1.000
Boston College	0	–	0	–	4	–	0	1.000
Georgia Tech	0	–	0	–	4	–	0	1.000
NC State	0	–	0	–	4	–	0	1.000
Notre Dame	0	–	0	–	4	–	0	1.000
Pittsburgh	0	–	0	–	4	–	0	1.000
SMU	0	–	0	–	4	–	0	1.000
Clemson	0	–	0	–	4	–	1	.800
No. 5 Duke	0	–	0	–	3	–	1	.750
Florida State	0	–	0	–	3	–	1	.750
No. 17 Miami (FL)	0	–	0	–	3	–	1	.750
North Carolina	0	–	0	–	3	–	1	.750
Stanford	0	–	0	–	3	–	1	.750
Wake Forest	0	–	0	–	3	–	1	.750
No. 23 Louisville	0	–	0	–	2	–	1	.667
California	0	–	0	–	3	–	2	.600
Syracuse	0	–	0	–	2	–	2	.500
† 2027 ACC tournament winner As of November 18, 2026; Rankings from AP poll

The 2026–27 Georgia Tech Yellow Jackets men's basketball team represents the Georgia Institute of Technology during the 2026–27 NCAA Division I men's basketball season. The Yellow Jackets are led by first-year head coach Scott Cross and play their home games at McCamish Pavilion in Atlanta, Georgia as members of the Atlantic Coast Conference.

Cross was hired from Troy on March 20, 2026, less than two weeks after Georgia Tech fired Damon Stoudamire. Cross had led Troy to back-to-back Sun Belt Conference championships and NCAA tournament appearances, and entered the season with 350 career wins over 19 seasons at UT Arlington and Troy. He inherited an almost completely rebuilt roster, with no returning starters, two returning lettermen, seven transfers and six freshmen; Kam Craft and Cole Kirouac were the only returning players. The Yellow Jackets were picked to finish last of 18 teams in the ACC's preseason media poll.

Georgia Tech lost both of its exhibition games, falling 85–70 to Maryland in Baltimore and 101–73 at Providence. Cross won his Georgia Tech debut 75–55 over Hampton, the 351st win of his career. The Yellow Jackets followed with a 95–83 win over Georgia Southern, in which Nasir Whitlock scored 29 points and the team made 36 free throws, its most in a regulation game since 1988.

== Previous season ==
The Yellow Jackets finished the 2025–26 season 11–20 overall and 2–16 in ACC play to finish in eighteenth place. They did not qualify for the 2026 ACC tournament and were not invited to a postseason tournament. The day after the season ended, head coach Damon Stoudamire was fired after three seasons.

== Offseason ==
=== Coaching changes ===
On March 20, 2026, Georgia Tech hired Troy head coach Scott Cross as the 16th head coach in program history. On April 7, Cross named Wes Flanigan and Kenneth Mangrum associate head coaches and Brandon Gilbert, Kelvin Lewis and Chris Kreider assistant coaches; Gilbert and Lewis followed Cross from Troy. Former Harvard assistant Matt Fraschilla joined the staff on April 17.

=== Departures ===
Georgia Tech Departures
Name	Number	Pos.	Height	Weight	Year	Hometown	Reason for Departure
Akai Fleming	0	G	6'4"	184	Freshman	Marietta, Georgia	Transferred to Cincinnati
Lamar Washington	1	G	6'4"	200	Senior	Portland, Oregon	Graduated
Eric Chatfield Jr.	2	G	5'11"	160	Freshman	Atlanta, Georgia	Transferred to Wofford
Jaeden Mustaf	3	G	6'6"	210	Sophomore	Bowie, Maryland	Transferred to Indiana
Peyton Marshall	5	C	7'0"	300	Sophomore	Atlanta, Georgia	Transferred to Charlotte
Mouhamed Sylla	6	C	6'10"	210	Freshman	Louga, Senegal	Transferred to West Virginia
Chas Kelley III	7	G	6'3"	185	Senior	Houston, Texas	Graduated
Davi Remagen	10	G	6'3"	193	Freshman	Cologne, Germany	Entered transfer portal
Baye Ndongo	11	F	6'9"	240	Junior	Mboro, Senegal	Transferred to Pittsburgh
Kowacie Reeves Jr.	14	G	6'7"	202	Senior	Macon, Georgia	Graduated
Brandon Stores Jr.	23	G	6'5"	210	Freshman	Bronx, New York	Transferred to NJIT
Dyllan Thompson	32	G/F	6'7"	215	(redshirt) Freshman	Sugar Land, Texas	Transferred to Weber State

=== Incoming transfers ===
Georgia Tech incoming transfers
Name	Number	Pos.	Height	Weight	Year	Hometown	Previous School
Colby Garland	0	G	6'1"	195	Senior	Magnolia, Arkansas	San Jose State
Nasir Whitlock	3	G	6'2"	185	Senior	Brooklyn Park, Minnesota	Lehigh
Jackson Fields	7	F	6'9"	220	Graduate Student	Missouri City, Texas	West Virginia
Tylis Jordan	10	F	6'10"	215	Sophomore	Milledgeville, Georgia	Ole Miss
Víctor Valdés	11	F	6'7"	245	Senior	Monterrey, Mexico	Troy
Jackson McVey	14	C	7'1"	250	Sophomore	Ellijay, Georgia	Georgia
Courtland Muldrew	30	G	6'3"	195	Sophomore	Bentonville, Arkansas	Washington

=== 2026 Recruiting class ===
Jalan Wingfield, who signed with Georgia Tech in November 2025, asked for his release after the coaching change and later signed with FIU. Kaiden Bailey also requested his release but rejoined the program under Cross.

College recruiting
Name	Hometown	School	Height	Weight	Commit date
Kayden Allen; CG	Lilburn, Georgia	Long Island Lutheran	6 ft 6 in (1.98 m)	210 lb (95 kg)	May 3, 2026
Kayden Allen; CG	Recruit ratings: 247Sports: ESPN: (83)				
Kaiden Bailey; CG	Irvine, California	Santa Margarita Catholic	6 ft 2 in (1.88 m)	195 lb (88 kg)	Sep 9, 2025
Kaiden Bailey; CG	Recruit ratings: Rivals: 247Sports: ESPN: (82)				
Moustapha Diop; C	Thiès, Senegal	Overtime Elite	6 ft 11 in (2.11 m)	205 lb (93 kg)	
Moustapha Diop; C	Recruit ratings: 247Sports: ESPN: (81)				
Haiden Harper; PG	Opelika, Alabama	Lee-Scott Academy	6 ft 1 in (1.85 m)	170 lb (77 kg)	Apr 9, 2026
Haiden Harper; PG	Recruit ratings: Scout: Rivals: 247Sports: ESPN: (NR)				
Ilja Kurucs; F	Cēsis, Latvia	Rīgas Tālmācības 1. vidusskola	6 ft 10 in (2.08 m)	215 lb (98 kg)	Jun 5, 2026
Ilja Kurucs; F	Recruit ratings: Scout: Rivals: 247Sports: ESPN: (NR)				
Overall recruit ranking: 247Sports: 31
Note: In many cases, Scout, Rivals, 247Sports, On3, and ESPN may conflict in their listings of height and weight.; In these cases, the average was taken. ESPN grades are on a 100-point scale.; Sources: "2026 Georgia Tech Commits". Rivals.; "Georgia Tech Yellow Jackets". ESPN.; "2026 Team Ranking". Rivals.

2026 overall class rankings

Website	National rank	Conference rank	5-star recruits	4-star recruits	Total
247 Sports	31		0	3	5
ESPN			0	3	4

== Roster ==
2026–27 Georgia Tech Yellow Jackets men's basketball team
Players
Coaches

Pos.	#	Name	Height	Weight	Year	Previous school	Hometown
G	0	Colby Garland	6 ft 1 in (1.85 m)	195 lb (88 kg)	Sr	Link Academy; San Jose State	Magnolia, AR
G	1	Kayden Allen	6 ft 6 in (1.98 m)	210 lb (95 kg)	Fr	Long Island Lutheran	Lilburn, GA
G	2	Kaiden Bailey	6 ft 2 in (1.88 m)	195 lb (88 kg)	Fr	Santa Margarita Catholic	Irvine, CA
G	3	Nasir Whitlock	6 ft 2 in (1.88 m)	185 lb (84 kg)	Sr	DeLaSalle; Lehigh	Brooklyn Park, MN
F	5	Moustapha Diop	6 ft 11 in (2.11 m)	205 lb (93 kg)	Fr	Overtime Elite	Thiès, Senegal
F	6	Ilja Kurucs	6 ft 10 in (2.08 m)	215 lb (98 kg)	Fr	Rīgas Tālmācības 1. vidusskola	Cēsis, Latvia
F	7	Jackson Fields	6 ft 9 in (2.06 m)	220 lb (100 kg)	GS	Troy; West Virginia	Missouri City, TX
C	8	Cole Kirouac	7 ft 0 in (2.13 m)	215 lb (98 kg)	So	Overtime Elite	Cumming, GA
G	9	Haiden Harper	6 ft 1 in (1.85 m)	170 lb (77 kg)	Fr	Lee-Scott Academy	Opelika, AL
F	10	Tylis Jordan	6 ft 10 in (2.08 m)	215 lb (98 kg)	So	Wheeler; Ole Miss	Milledgeville, GA
F	11	Víctor Valdés	6 ft 7 in (2.01 m)	245 lb (111 kg)	Sr	Troy	Monterrey, Mexico
G/F	12	Kam Craft	6 ft 6 in (1.98 m)	215 lb (98 kg)	GS	The Skill Factory; Miami (OH)	Chicago, IL
C	14	Jackson McVey	7 ft 1 in (2.16 m)	250 lb (113 kg)	So	Georgia	Ellijay, GA
G	30	Courtland Muldrew	6 ft 3 in (1.91 m)	195 lb (88 kg)	So	Oak Hill Academy; Washington	Bentonville, AR
G	35	Cody Cross	6 ft 2 in (1.88 m)	195 lb (88 kg)	Fr	Charles Henderson	Mansfield, TX

Head coach

- Scott Cross (UT Arlington)

Assistant coach(es)

- Wes Flanigan
- Kenneth Mangrum
- Brandon Gilbert
- Kelvin Lewis
- Chris Kreider
- Matt Fraschilla (Harvard)

Legend

- (C) Team captain
- (S) Suspended
- (I) Ineligible
- (W) Walk-on
- Injured
- Current redshirt

Roster

== Schedule and results ==
Date time, TV	Rank^{#}	Opponent^{#}	Result	Record	High points	High rebounds	High assists	Site (attendance) city, state
Exhibition
October 11, 2026*; 4:30 p.m., B1G+		vs. Maryland	L 70–85	–	17 – Whitlock	10 – Fields	3 – Bailey	Chesapeake Employers Insurance Arena (2,265); Baltimore, MD
October 24, 2026*; 12:00 p.m.		at Providence	L 73–101	–	17 – Craft	4 – Tied	3 – Tied	Amica Mutual Pavilion (4,733); Providence, RI
Non-conference regular season
November 3, 2026*; 7:00 p.m., ACCNX		Hampton	W 75–55	1–0	16 – Garland	10 – Kirouac	4 – Garland	McCamish Pavilion (6,749); Atlanta, GA
November 6, 2026*; 7:00 p.m., ACCNX		Georgia Southern	W 95–83	2–0	29 – Whitlock	7 – Whitlock	6 – Tied	McCamish Pavilion (5,214); Atlanta, GA
November 10, 2026*; 7:00 p.m., ACCNX		Eastern Kentucky	W 85–71	3–0	27 – Jordan	7 – Tied	6 – Valdes	McCamish Pavilion (4,789); Atlanta, GA
November 14, 2026*; 4:00 p.m., ACCNX		UNC Asheville	W 75–74	4–0	17 – Jordan	14 – Fields	5 – Valdes	McCamish Pavilion (5,023); Atlanta, GA
November 17, 2026*; 7:00 p.m., ACCNX		Norfolk State	W 93–79	5–0	25 – Craft	5 – Tied	9 – Valdes	McCamish Pavilion (5,234); Atlanta, GA
November 20, 2026*; 8:00 p.m., ESPNU		Georgia; Rivalry						McCamish Pavilion; Atlanta, GA
November 24, 2026*; 7:00 p.m., ACCNX		Samford						McCamish Pavilion; Atlanta, GA
November 28, 2026*; 7:00 p.m., ACCNX		Alcorn State						McCamish Pavilion; Atlanta, GA
December 2, 2026*; 9:15 p.m., SECN		at Mississippi State; ACC–SEC Challenge						Humphrey Coliseum; Starkville, MS
December 6, 2026*; 4:00 p.m., ESPNU		vs. Murray State						Bridgestone Arena; Nashville, TN
December 9, 2026*; 7:00 p.m., ACCN		The Citadel						McCamish Pavilion; Atlanta, GA
December 12, 2026*; 12:00 p.m., ESPNU		vs. Florida; Hall of Fame Series						Kia Center; Orlando, FL
December 19, 2026*; 3:00 p.m., FS1		vs. Butler; Indy Classic						Gainbridge Fieldhouse; Indianapolis, IN
December 22, 2026*; 7:00 p.m., ACCNX		Longwood						McCamish Pavilion; Atlanta, GA
ACC regular season
December 30, 2026; 7:30 p.m., ESPN		Duke						McCamish Pavilion; Atlanta, GA
January 2, 2027; 12:00 p.m., The CW		at Syracuse						JMA Wireless Dome; Syracuse, NY
January 5, 2027; 7:00 p.m., ACCN		Miami (FL)						McCamish Pavilion; Atlanta, GA
January 9, 2027; 12:30 p.m., ACCN		Notre Dame						McCamish Pavilion; Atlanta, GA
January 12, 2027; 9:00 p.m.		at Clemson						Littlejohn Coliseum; Clemson, SC
January 19, 2027; 9:00 p.m., ACCN		NC State						McCamish Pavilion; Atlanta, GA
January 23, 2027; 4:30 p.m., ACCN		at SMU						Moody Coliseum; Dallas, TX
January 27, 2027; 8:00 p.m., The CW		at Virginia						John Paul Jones Arena; Charlottesville, VA
January 30, 2027; 12:00 p.m.		Louisville						McCamish Pavilion; Atlanta, GA
February 3, 2027; 7:00 p.m., ACCN		Stanford						McCamish Pavilion; Atlanta, GA
February 6, 2027; 2:15 p.m., The CW		at North Carolina						Dean Smith Center; Chapel Hill, NC
February 9, 2027; 9:00 p.m., ACCN		at Boston College						Conte Forum; Chestnut Hill, MA
February 16, 2027; 7:00 p.m., ESPNU		Clemson						McCamish Pavilion; Atlanta, GA
February 20, 2027; 8:00 p.m., ESPN2		at Pittsburgh						Petersen Events Center; Pittsburgh, PA
February 23, 2027; 6:00 p.m., ACCN		at Florida State						Donald L. Tucker Center; Tallahassee, FL
February 27, 2027; 12:00 p.m., The CW		SMU						McCamish Pavilion; Atlanta, GA
March 3, 2027; 8:30 p.m., ACCN		at Wake Forest						Lawrence Joel Veterans Memorial Coliseum; Winston-Salem, NC
March 6, 2027; 12:00 p.m., ACCN		Virginia Tech						McCamish Pavilion; Atlanta, GA
ACC Tournament
March 9–13, 2027; TBA		vs. TBD						First Horizon Coliseum; Greensboro, NC
*Non-conference game. ^{#}Rankings from AP poll. (#) Tournament seedings in parentheses. All times are in Eastern Time.

== Rankings ==
Ranking movements Legend: — = Not ranked
	Week																				
Poll	Pre	1	2	3	4	5	6	7	8	9	10	11	12	13	14	15	16	17	18	19	Final
AP	—	—	—																		
Coaches	—	—	—																		
