= 2026–27 Notre Dame Fighting Irish men's basketball team =

American college basketball season

2026–27 Notre Dame Fighting Irish men's basketball
- Conference: Atlantic Coast Conference
- Record: 6–1 (0–0 ACC)
- Head coach: Micah Shrewsberry (4th season)
- Associate head coach: Mike Farrelly (1st in current role, 4th overall season)
- Assistant coaches: Ryan Owens (4th season); Tre Whitted (2nd season); Grady Eifert (2nd season); Tony Rack (1st season)
- Home arena: Joyce Center

2026–27 ACC men's basketball standings
	Conf.				Overall
Team	W		L	PCT	W		L	PCT
No. 4 Virginia	0	–	0	–	6	–	0	1.000
Boston College	0	–	0	–	5	–	0	1.000
Georgia Tech	0	–	0	–	5	–	0	1.000
Virginia Tech	0	–	0	–	5	–	0	1.000
Pittsburgh	0	–	0	–	5	–	0	1.000
SMU	0	–	0	–	5	–	0	1.000
NC State	0	–	0	–	4	–	0	1.000
Notre Dame	0	–	0	–	5	–	1	.833
Clemson	0	–	0	–	4	–	1	.800
Florida State	0	–	0	–	4	–	1	.800
No. 17 Miami (FL)	0	–	0	–	4	–	1	.800
Stanford	0	–	0	–	4	–	1	.800
Wake Forest	0	–	0	–	4	–	1	.800
North Carolina	0	–	0	–	3	–	1	.750
No. 23 Louisville	0	–	0	–	2	–	1	.667
California	0	–	0	–	3	–	2	.600
No. 5 Duke	0	–	0	–	3	–	2	.600
Syracuse	0	–	0	–	3	–	2	.600
† 2027 ACC tournament winner As of November 20, 2026; Rankings from AP poll

The 2026–27 Notre Dame Fighting Irish men's basketball team represents the University of Notre Dame, located in Notre Dame, Indiana, in the 2026–27 NCAA Division I men's basketball season. The team is led by head coach Micah Shrewsberry in his fourth season as head coach and plays home games at the on-campus Joyce Center as members of the Atlantic Coast Conference (ACC).

== Previous season ==
The Fighting Irish finished the season 13–18 and 4–14 in ACC play to finish tied with Boston College for 16th place. They did not qualify for the 2026 ACC tournament and were not invited to a post-season tournament.

== Offseason ==
=== Departures ===
Departures
Name	Number	Pos.	Height	Weight	Year	Hometown	Reason for Departure
Carson Towt	33	F	6'8"	250	Graduate	Gilbert, AZ	Graduated; signed with the Indianapolis Colts
Matthew MacLellan	34	F	6'9"	240	Graduate	Canton, MI	Walk-on; graduated; signed with Liverpool Basketball
Kebba Njie	14	F	6'10"	255	Senior	Centerville, OH	Graduated; signed with the Texas Legends
Markus Burton	3	G	6'0"	190	Junior	Mishawaka, IN	Transferred to Indiana
Cole Certa	5	G	6'5"	205	Sophomore	Le Roy, IL	Transferred to Clemson
Garrett Sundra	12	F	6'11"	230	Sophomore	Ashburn, VA	Transferred to James Madison
Sir Mohammed	13	G	6'6"	215	Sophomore	Charlotte, NC	Transferred to Penn
Jalen Haralson	10	G	6'7"	220	Freshman	Anderson, IN	Transferred to Tennessee
Ryder Frost	7	F	6'7"	215	Freshman	Beverly, MA	Transferred to George Washington

=== Incoming transfers ===
Incoming transfers
Name	Number	Pos.	Height	Weight	Year	Hometown	Previous School
Logan Duncomb	51	C	6'10"	250	Fifth year	Cincinnati, OH	Winthrop
Ethan Roberts	23	G/F	6'5"	200	Fifth year	Arlington Heights, IL	Penn
Braeden Smith	3	G	6'0"	180	Fifth year	Seattle, WA	Gonzaga
Yoro Diallo	7	F	6'9"	215	Fifth year	Cincinnati, OH	UVA Wise
Bryce Ruglass Dortch	4	F	6'9"	235	Junior	Somerville, MA	Rutgers
Devin Brown	5	G	6'6"	215	Sophomore	Lewis Center, OH	Davidson

=== 2026 recruiting class ===
College recruiting
Name	Hometown	School	Height	Weight	Commit date
Jonathan Sanderson #14 PG	Ann Arbor, MI	La Lumiere	6 ft 3 in (1.91 m)	195 lb (88 kg)	Jun 8, 2025
Jonathan Sanderson #14 PG	Recruit ratings: Rivals: 247Sports: ESPN: (84)				
Gan-Erdene Solongo #28 C	Ulaanbaatar, Mongolia	La Lumiere	7 ft 0 in (2.13 m)	275 lb (125 kg)	Jun 9, 2025
Gan-Erdene Solongo #28 C	Recruit ratings: Rivals: 247Sports: ESPN: (79)				
Nick Shrewsberry #95 SG	Granger, IN	St. Joseph	6 ft 5 in (1.96 m)	200 lb (91 kg)	Oct 28, 2025
Nick Shrewsberry #95 SG	Recruit ratings: Rivals: 247Sports: ESPN: (NR)				
Overall recruit ranking: Rivals: 44 247Sports: 61
Note: In many cases, Scout, Rivals, 247Sports, On3, and ESPN may conflict in their listings of height and weight.; In these cases, the average was taken. ESPN grades are on a 100-point scale.; Sources: "Notre Dame 2026 Basketball Commitments". Rivals.; "Notre Dame Fighting Irish". ESPN.; "2026 Team Ranking". Rivals.; "Notre Dame 2026 Basketball Commits". 247Sports.

== Roster ==
2026–27 Notre Dame Fighting Irish men's basketball team
Players
Coaches

Pos.	#	Name	Height	Weight	Year	Previous school	Hometown
C	51	Logan Duncomb	6 ft 10 in (2.08 m)	250 lb (113 kg)	GS	Winthrop	Cincinnati, OH
G/F	23	Ethan Roberts	6 ft 5 in (1.96 m)	200 lb (91 kg)	GS	Penn	Arlington Heights, IL
G	3	Braeden Smith	6 ft 0 in (1.83 m)	180 lb (82 kg)	GS	Gonzaga	Seattle, WA
F	7	Yoro Diallo	6 ft 9 in (2.06 m)	215 lb (98 kg)	GS	UVA Wise	Cincinnati, OH
G	11	Braeden Shrewsberry	6 ft 4 in (1.93 m)	205 lb (93 kg)	Sr	State College Area	Granger, IN
G	2	Logan Imes	6 ft 4 in (1.93 m)	200 lb (91 kg)	Sr	Zionsville Community	Zionsville, IN
G	0	Brady Stevens (W)	6 ft 4 in (1.93 m)	190 lb (86 kg)	Jr	Wellesley	Boston, MA
F	4	Bryce Ruglass Dortch	6 ft 9 in (2.06 m)	235 lb (107 kg)	Jr	Rutgers	Somerville, MA
F	6	Brady Koehler	6 ft 10 in (2.08 m)	220 lb (100 kg)	So	Cathedral	Fishers, IN
C	15	Tommy Ahneman (injured)	6 ft 10 in (2.08 m)	255 lb (116 kg)	So	Cretin-Derham Hall	Fargo, ND
F	22	Luke Devine (W)	6 ft 7 in (2.01 m)	220 lb (100 kg)	So	Campolindo	Moraga, CA
G	5	Devin Brown	6 ft 6 in (1.98 m)	215 lb (98 kg)	So	Davidson	Lewis Center, OH
G	10	Jonathan Sanderson	6 ft 3 in (1.91 m)	195 lb (88 kg)	Fr	La Lumiere	Ann Arbor, MI
C	44	Gan-Erdene Solongo	7 ft 0 in (2.13 m)	275 lb (125 kg)	Fr	La Lumiere	Ulaanbaatar, Mongolia
G	12	Nick Shrewsberry	6 ft 5 in (1.96 m)	200 lb (91 kg)	Fr	St. Joseph HS	Granger, IN
G	8	Jake Burow (W)	6 ft 3 in (1.91 m)	200 lb (91 kg)	Fr	Lake Country Lutheran	Slinger, WI

Head coach

- Micah Shrewsberry (Hanover)

Assistant coach(es)

- Mike Farrelly (Saint Joseph's)
- Ryan Owens (Southern Indiana)
- Tre Whitted (Marshall)
- Grady Eifert (Purdue)
- Tony Rack (Northern Kentucky)

Legend

- (C) Team captain
- (S) Suspended
- (I) Ineligible
- (W) Walk-on
- Injured
- Current redshirt

Roster
Last update: 2026-11-11

- Roster is subject to change as/if players transfer or leave the program for other reasons.

=== Depth chart ===
Pos.	Starting 5	Bench 1	Bench 2	Bench 3
C	Logan Duncomb		Gan-Erdene Solongo
PF	Brady Koehler	Bryce Ruglass Dortch		Luke Devine
SF	Ethan Roberts	Yoro Diallo	Devin Brown	Nick Shrewsberry
SG	Braeden Shrewsberry	Logan Imes		Brady Stevens
PG	Braeden Smith	Jonathan Sanderson		Jake Burow

== Schedule and results ==
Date time, TV	Rank^{#}	Opponent^{#}	Result	Record	High points	High rebounds	High assists	Site (attendance) city, state
Exhibition
October 17, 2026*; 7:00 p.m.		at Dayton	L 65–75	—	11 – Roberts	4 – Tied	3 – Smith	University of Dayton Arena (13,407); Dayton, OH
October 23, 2026*		at DePaul	W 71–63	—	19 – Koehler	5 – Tied	5 – Koehler	Wintrust Arena (3,828); Chicago, IL
Non-conference regular season
November 1, 2026*; 9:30 a.m., FOX		vs. Villanova; Eternal City Tip-Off	W 74–72	1–0	16 – Tied	8 – Koehler	4 – Duncomb	Palazzo dello Sport; Rome, Italy
November 5, 2026*; 7:00 p.m., ACCNX		Mercyhurst	W 83–56	2–0	18 – Roberts	6 – Tied	10 – Smith	Joyce Center (3,571); Notre Dame, IN
November 9, 2026*; 7:00 p.m., ACCNX		Eastern Illinois	W 94–70	3–0	20 – Duncomb	6 – Koehler	8 – Smith	Joyce Center (2,985); Notre Dame, IN
November 11, 2026*; 7:00 p.m., ACCNX		South Carolina State	W 99–59	4–0	36 – Roberts	10 – Duncomb	8 – Smith	Joyce Center (3,026); Notre Dame, IN
November 17, 2026*; 4:30 p.m., ESPN		vs. No. 1 Florida; Players Era 8 First Round	L 78–86	4–1	20 – Shrewsberry	5 – Tied	5 – Smith	Michelob Ultra Arena (3,923); Las Vegas, NV
November 18, 2026*; 2:00 p.m., ESPN		vs. Rutgers; Players Era 8 Consolation Game	W 110–100 ^{OT}	5–1	27 – Koehler	8 – Koehler	6 – Smith	Michelob Ultra Arena; Las Vegas, NV
November 19, 2026*; 5:00 p.m., ESPN		vs. Auburn; Players Era 8 – 5th Place Game	W 78–73	6–1	23 – Smith	8 – Tied	4 – Smith	Michelob Ultra Arena; Las Vegas, NV
November 24, 2026*; 8:00 p.m., ACCNX		Central Michigan						Joyce Center; Notre Dame, IN
November 28, 2026*; 8:00 p.m., ACCNX		Stonehill						Joyce Center; Notre Dame, IN
December 2, 2026*; 7:15 p.m., ACCN		Vanderbilt; SEC/ACC Challenge						Joyce Center; Notre Dame, IN
December 5, 2026*; 2:00 p.m., ESPNU		TCU						Joyce Center; Notre Dame, IN
December 8, 2026*; 7:00 p.m., ACCNX		LIU						Joyce Center; Notre Dame, IN
December 12, 2026*; 2:30 p.m., ACCN		Ohio State						Joyce Center; Notre Dame, IN
December 21, 2026*; 2:00 p.m., ACCNX		Le Moyne						Joyce Center; Notre Dame, IN
ACC regular season
December 30, 2026; 2:00 p.m., ACCN		Stanford						Joyce Center; Notre Dame, IN
January 6, 2026; 7:00 p.m., ACCN		Virginia Tech						Joyce Center; Notre Dame, IN
January 9, 2026; 12:30 p.m., ACCN		at Georgia Tech						McCamish Pavilion; Atlanta, GA
January 12, 2026; 7:00 p.m., ACCN		at Wake Forest						LJVM Coliseum; Winston-Salem, NC
January 16, 2026; 2:00 p.m., ACCN		California						Joyce Center; Notre Dame, IN
January 20, 2026; 7:00 p.m., ESPN2/ESPNU		Pittsburgh						Joyce Center; Notre Dame, IN
January 23, 2026; 2:15 p.m., The CW		at Duke						Cameron Indoor Stadium; Durham, NC
January 26, 2026; 7:00 p.m., ACCN		at Florida State						Donald L. Tucker Civic Center; Tallahassee, FL
January 30, 2026; 12:30 p.m., ACCN		SMU						Joyce Center; Notre Dame, IN
February 2, 2026; 7:00 p.m., ESPN/ESPN2		North Carolina						Joyce Center; Notre Dame, IN
February 6, 2026; 5:30 p.m., ACCN		at Boston College						Conte Forum; Chestnut Hill, MA
February 13, 2026; 2:00 p.m., ACCN		at Virginia						JPJ Arena; Charlottesville, VA
February 17, 2026; 9:00 p.m., ACCN		Wake Forest						Joyce Center; Notre Dame, IN
February 20, 2026; 4:30 p.m., ACCN		at Miami (FL)						Watsco Center; Coral Gables, FL
February 24, 2026; 7:00 p.m., ACCN		NC State						Lenovo Center; Raleigh, NC
February 27, 2026; 8:00 p.m., The CW		Syracuse						Joyce Center; Notre Dame, IN
March 2, 2026; 7:00 p.m., ESPN2/ESPNU/ACCN		at Clemson						Littlejohn Coliseum; Clemson, SC
March 6, 2026; 2:00 p.m., ACCN		Boston College						Joyce Center; Notre Dame, IN
*Non-conference game. ^{#}Rankings from AP Poll. (#) Tournament seedings in parentheses. All times are in Eastern Time.

== Rankings ==
Ranking movements Legend: ██ Increase in ranking ██ Decrease in ranking — = Not ranked RV = Received votes
	Week																				
Poll	Pre	1	2	3	4	5	6	7	8	9	10	11	12	13	14	15	16	17	18	19	Final
AP	—	—	RV																		
Coaches	—	—	—																		
