= 2026–27 California Golden Bears men's basketball team =

American basketball team

2026–27 California Golden Bears men's basketball
- Conference: Atlantic Coast Conference
- Record: 3–2 (0–0 ACC)
- Head coach: Mark Madsen (4th season)
- Associate head coach: Adam Mazarei
- Assistant coaches: Jarred Jackson; Ken Moses; Matt Scherbenske; Casey Hill
- Home arena: Haas Pavilion (Capacity: 11,858)

2026–27 ACC men's basketball standings
	Conf.				Overall
Team	W		L	PCT	W		L	PCT
No. 4 Virginia	0	–	0	–	5	–	0	1.000
Boston College	0	–	0	–	4	–	0	1.000
Georgia Tech	0	–	0	–	4	–	0	1.000
NC State	0	–	0	–	4	–	0	1.000
Notre Dame	0	–	0	–	4	–	0	1.000
Pittsburgh	0	–	0	–	4	–	0	1.000
SMU	0	–	0	–	4	–	0	1.000
Virginia Tech	0	–	0	–	4	–	0	1.000
Clemson	0	–	0	–	3	–	1	.750
No. 5 Duke	0	–	0	–	3	–	1	.750
Florida State	0	–	0	–	3	–	1	.750
No. 17 Miami (FL)	0	–	0	–	3	–	1	.750
North Carolina	0	–	0	–	3	–	1	.750
Stanford	0	–	0	–	3	–	1	.750
Wake Forest	0	–	0	–	3	–	1	.750
No. 23 Louisville	0	–	0	–	2	–	1	.667
California	0	–	0	–	3	–	2	.600
Syracuse	0	–	0	–	2	–	2	.500
† 2027 ACC tournament winner As of November 17, 2026; Rankings from AP poll

The 2026–27 California Golden Bears men's basketball team represents the University of California, Berkeley during the 2026–27 NCAA Division I men's basketball season. The Golden Bears, led by fourth-year head coach Mark Madsen, play their home games at Haas Pavilion in Berkeley, California as members of the Atlantic Coast Conference.

== Previous season ==
The Golden Bears finished the 2025–26 season 22–12, 9–9 in ACC play, to finish in a tie for ninth place. As the #9 seed in the ACC tournament, they were defeated by #8 seed Florida State in the second round. They received an exempt bid to the NIT, where they would defeat UIC in the first round, before falling to Saint Joseph's in the second round.

== Offseason ==
=== Departures ===
Departures
Name	Number	Pos.	Height	Weight	Year	Hometown	Reason for Departure
DeJuan (DJ) Campbell	1	G	6'3"	205	Senior	Hampton, Virginia	Graduated
John Camden	2	F	6'8"	220	Graduate Student	Downingtown, Pennsylvania	Graduated
Dai Dai Ames	7	G	6'2"	190	Junior	Chicago, Illinois	Transferred to Tennessee
Milos Ilić	8	C	6'10"	240	Graduate Student	Gornji Milanovac, Serbia	Graduated
Justin Pippen	10	G	6'3"	190	Sophomore	Los Angeles, California	Transferred to Ohio State
Nolan Dorsey	21	G	6'5"	210	Graduate Student	Knightdale, North Carolina	Graduated
Chris Bell	22	F	6'7"	195	Senior	Concord, California	Graduated
Stephon Marbury II	30	G	6'1"	170	Sophomore	Purchase, New York	Entered the transfer portal
Rytis Petraitis	31	F	6'7"	215	Senior	Arlington, Texas	Transferred to New Mexico

=== Incoming transfers ===
Incoming transfers
Name	Number	Pos.	Height	Weight	Year	Hometown	Previous School
Jordan Ross	2	G	6'3"	190	Senior	Pleasant Grove, Utah	Georgia
Amier Ali	14	G/F	6'8"	205	Junior	Dallas, Texas	Mississippi State
Jake Wilkins	21	F	6'9"	190	Sophomore	Lilburn, Georgia	Georgia
Nojus Indrušaitis	25	G	6'5"	205	Junior	Lemont, Illinois	Pittsburgh
Michael Cooper	55	G	6'3"	190	Sophomore	Jeffersonville, Indiana	Wright State

=== 2026 recruiting class ===
College recruiting
Name	Hometown	School	Height	Weight	Commit date
Dominykas Daubaris; PF	Mažeikiai, Lithuania		6 ft 9 in (2.06 m)	215 lb (98 kg)	May 7, 2026
Dominykas Daubaris; PF	Recruit ratings: (NR)				
Dionycius Bakare; SG	Malvern, PA	The Phelps School	6 ft 5 in (1.96 m)	170 lb (77 kg)	Oct 22, 2025
Dionycius Bakare; SG	Recruit ratings: (NR)				
Gabriel Sularski; CG	Lisle, IL	Layton Christian Academy	6 ft 6 in (1.98 m)	180 lb (82 kg)	May 21, 2026
Gabriel Sularski; CG	Recruit ratings: (NR)				
Nicolas Mitrovic; SG	Braintree, MA	Cambridge Arts, Technology and Science	6 ft 11 in (2.11 m)	200 lb (91 kg)	Mar 3, 2026
Nicolas Mitrovic; SG	Recruit ratings: (NR)				
Overall recruit ranking:
Note: In many cases, Scout, Rivals, 247Sports, On3, and ESPN may conflict in their listings of height and weight.; In these cases, the average was taken. ESPN grades are on a 100-point scale.; Sources:

== Preseason ==
On October 13, 2026, the Atlantic Coast Conference released their preseason poll. California was picked to finish 15th in the conference.

=== Preseason rankings ===
ACC Preseason Poll
Place	Team	Points
1	Duke	861 (45)
2	Virginia	778 (1)
3	Louisville	758 (1)
4	Miami	753 (1)
5	North Carolina	658
6	Clemson	623
7	Florida State	519
8	NC State	502
9	Virginia Tech	489
10	SMU	443
11	Syracuse	353
12	Pittsburgh	323
13	Stanford	267
14	Wake Forest	234
15	California	225
16	Notre Dame	153
17	Boston College	150
18	Georgia Tech	119
(#) first-place votes

=== Preseason All-ACC Teams ===
No players were named to the Preseason All-ACC First or Second Teams.

== Roster ==
2026–27 California Golden Bears men's basketball team
Players
Coaches

Pos.	#	Name	Height	Weight	Year	Previous school	Hometown
G	1	Jovani Ruff	6 ft 5 in (1.96 m)	215 lb (98 kg)	RS Fr	Long Beach Poly High School	Long Beach, California
G	2	Jordan Ross	6 ft 3 in (1.91 m)	190 lb (86 kg)	Sr	Georgia	Pleasant Grove, Utah
G	3	Semetri (TT) Carr	6 ft 1 in (1.85 m)	175 lb (79 kg)	So	Redwood High School	Mill Valley, California
G	6	Jorell Clark	6 ft 0 in (1.83 m)	180 lb (82 kg)	RS Fr	Palo Alto High School	Palo Alto, California
F/C	8	Dominykas Daubaris	6 ft 11 in (2.11 m)	235 lb (107 kg)	Fr	Kaunas Varpas Gymnasium	Mažeikiai, Lithuania
F/C	10	Nicolas Mitrovic	7 ft 0 in (2.13 m)	215 lb (98 kg)	Fr	CATS Academy Boston	Frisco, Texas
F	12	Dhiaukuei Manyiel Dut	7 ft 0 in (2.13 m)	215 lb (98 kg)	RS Jr	Georgia State	Rumbek, South Sudan
G/F	14	Amier Ali	6 ft 8 in (2.03 m)	205 lb (93 kg)	Jr	Mississippi State	Dallas, Texas
G	15	Luke Butler	6 ft 4 in (1.93 m)	190 lb (86 kg)	So	Westlake High School	Austin, Texas
C	17	Mantas Kočanas	6 ft 11 in (2.11 m)	245 lb (111 kg)	Jr	Florida Atlantic	Karčiupis, Lithuania
G/F	19	Dionycius (Nyce) Bakare	6 ft 5 in (1.96 m)	215 lb (98 kg)	Fr	Bella Vista Academy	Vancouver, British Columbia
F	21	Jake Wilkins	6 ft 9 in (2.06 m)	190 lb (86 kg)	So	Georgia	Lilburn, Georgia
F	23	Sammie Yeanay	6 ft 9 in (2.06 m)	235 lb (107 kg)	Jr	Grand Canyon	Gainesville, Florida
G	25	Nojus Indrušaitis	6 ft 5 in (1.96 m)	205 lb (93 kg)	Jr	Pittsburgh	Lemont, Illinois
G	26	BJ Fisher	6 ft 1 in (1.85 m)	180 lb (82 kg)	Jr	Redwood High School	Ross, California
F	34	Lee Dort	6 ft 10 in (2.08 m)	240 lb (109 kg)	GS	Vanderbilt	Dallas, Texas
G	55	Michael Cooper	6 ft 3 in (1.91 m)	190 lb (86 kg)	So	Wright State	Jeffersonville, Indiana
G	77	Gabriel Sularski	6 ft 6 in (1.98 m)	200 lb (91 kg)	Fr	Layton Christian Academy	Lemont, Illinois

Head coach

- Mark Madsen (Stanford)

Assistant coach(es)

- Adam Mazarei (Redlands)
- Jarred Jackson (Lander)
- Ken Moses (CSU Pueblo)
- Matt Scherbenske (Kentucky)
- Casey Hill (Trinity)

Legend

- (C) Team captain
- (S) Suspended
- (I) Ineligible
- (W) Walk-on
- Injured
- Current redshirt

Roster
Last update: November 10, 2026

== Schedule and results ==
Date time, TV	Rank^{#}	Opponent^{#}	Result	Record	High points	High rebounds	High assists	Site (attendance) city, state
Exhibition
October 16, 2026*; 6:00 pm, ESPN+		at Loyola Marymount	W 60–59	–	12 – Cooper	5 – Wilkins	6 – Ross	Gersten Pavilion (1,502); Los Angeles, CA
October 24, 2026*; 6:00 pm		at Oregon State	L 76–89	–	24 – Yeanay	10 – Yeanay	5 – Ross	Gill Coliseum; Corvallis, OR
Non-conference regular season
November 2, 2026*; 5:00 pm, ACCNX		Adams State	W 115–86	1–0	24 – Cooper	7 – Wilkins	9 – Ross	Haas Pavilion (3,860); Berkeley, CA
November 4, 2026*; 6:00 pm, ACCNX		Radford	W 84–70	2–0	30 – Indrušaitis	6 – Tied	7 – Ross	Haas Pavilion (1,952); Berkeley, CA
November 8, 2026*; 5:30 pm, CW		vs. No. 10 Houston; Caesars Lake Tahoe Classic	L 68–86	2–1	19 – Cooper	6 – Carr	5 – Ross	Tahoe Blue Event Center (2,496); Stateline, NV
November 11, 2026*; 8:00 pm, ACCN		No. 21 USC	L 65–77	2–2	14 – Yeanay	6 – Indrusaitis	5 – Carr	Haas Pavilion (5,087); Berkeley, CA
November 14, 2026*; 2:00 pm, ACCNX		Utah Tech	W 79–73	3–2	24 – Indrusaitis	7 – Yeanay	3 – Tied	Haas Pavilion (2,862); Berkeley, CA
November 19, 2026*; 7:00 pm, ACCNX		East Texas A&M						Haas Pavilion; Berkeley, CA
November 23, 2026*; 7:00 pm, ACCNX		Alabama State						Haas Pavilion; Berkeley, CA
November 28, 2026*; 5:00 pm, BTN		vs. Minnesota						Sanford Pentagon; Sioux Falls, SD
December 2, 2026*; 6:00 pm, Peacock		at Utah						Jon M. Huntsman Center; Salt Lake City, UT
December 6, 2026*; 5:00 pm, ACCN		Vanderbilt						Haas Pavilion; Berkeley, CA
December 10, 2026*; 7:00 pm, ACCNX		Southeastern Louisiana						Haas Pavilion; Berkeley, CA
December 12, 2026*; 12:00 pm, ACCNX		UC Riverside						Haas Pavilion; Berkeley, CA
December 20, 2026*; 12:00 pm, ACCNX		Southern						Haas Pavilion; Berkeley, CA
December 22, 2026*; 3:00 pm, ACCNX		Northeastern						Haas Pavilion; Berkeley, CA
ACC regular season
December 30, 2026; 1:00 pm, ACCN		at North Carolina						Dean Smith Center; Chapel Hill, NC
January 2, 2027; 11:15 am, CW		at Duke						Cameron Indoor Stadium; Durham, NC
January 6, 2027; 6:00 pm, ESPNU		Florida State						Haas Pavilion; Berkeley, CA
January 9, 2027; 1:00 pm, ESPNU		Virginia						Haas Pavilion; Berkeley, CA
January 13, 2027; 4:00 pm, ACCN		at Louisville						KFC Yum! Center; Louisville, KY
January 16, 2027; 11:00 am, ACCN		at Notre Dame						Joyce Center; Notre Dame, IN
January 23, 2027; 6:00 pm, CW		Stanford						Haas Pavilion; Berkeley, CA
January 27, 2027; 6:00 pm, ACCN		NC State						Haas Pavilion; Berkeley, CA
January 30, 2027; 2:30 pm, ACCN		Syracuse						Haas Pavilion; Berkeley, CA
February 5, 2027; 5:00 pm, CW		at SMU						Moody Coliseum; University Park, TX
February 6, 2027; 9:00 am, CW		at Clemson						Littlejohn Coliseum; Clemson, SC
February 10, 2027; 6:00 pm, ACCN		Virginia Tech						Haas Pavilion; Berkeley, CA
February 13, 2027; 7:00 pm, ESPN2		Miami (FL)						Haas Pavilion; Berkeley, CA
February 17, 2027; 4:00 pm, ACCN		at Pittsburgh						Petersen Events Center; Pittsburgh, PA
February 20, 2027; 9:00 am, CW		at NC State						Lenovo Center; Raleigh, NC
February 24, 2027; 6:00 pm, ACCN		Boston College						Haas Pavilion; Berkeley, CA
February 27, 2027; 1:30 pm, ACCN		Wake Forest						Haas Pavilion; Berkeley, CA
March 6, 2027; 1:00 pm, ACCN		at Stanford						Maples Pavilion; Stanford, CA
ACC tournament
March 9–13, 2027		vs.						First Horizon Coliseum; Greensboro, NC
*Non-conference game. ^{#}Rankings from AP poll. (#) Tournament seedings in parentheses. All times are in Pacific.
