= 2026–27 Wake Forest Demon Deacons men's basketball team =

American college basketball season

2026–27 Wake Forest Demon Deacons men's basketball
- Conference: Atlantic Coast Conference
- Record: 3–1 (0–0 ACC)
- Head coach: Steve Forbes (7th season)
- Assistant coaches: Nick Friedman (2nd season); Darnell Harris (2nd season); Antanas Kavaliauskas (4th season); BJ McKie (7th season); Matt Woodley (5th season)
- Home arena: LJVM Coliseum

2026–27 ACC men's basketball standings
	Conf.				Overall
Team	W		L	PCT	W		L	PCT
No. 4 Virginia	0	–	0	–	5	–	0	1.000
Boston College	0	–	0	–	4	–	0	1.000
Georgia Tech	0	–	0	–	4	–	0	1.000
NC State	0	–	0	–	4	–	0	1.000
Notre Dame	0	–	0	–	4	–	0	1.000
Pittsburgh	0	–	0	–	4	–	0	1.000
SMU	0	–	0	–	4	–	0	1.000
Virginia Tech	0	–	0	–	4	–	0	1.000
Clemson	0	–	0	–	3	–	1	.750
No. 5 Duke	0	–	0	–	3	–	1	.750
Florida State	0	–	0	–	3	–	1	.750
No. 17 Miami (FL)	0	–	0	–	3	–	1	.750
North Carolina	0	–	0	–	3	–	1	.750
Stanford	0	–	0	–	3	–	1	.750
Wake Forest	0	–	0	–	3	–	1	.750
No. 23 Louisville	0	–	0	–	2	–	1	.667
California	0	–	0	–	3	–	2	.600
Syracuse	0	–	0	–	2	–	2	.500
† 2027 ACC tournament winner As of November 17, 2026; Rankings from AP poll

The 2026–27 Wake Forest Demon Deacons men's basketball team represent Wake Forest University during the 2026–27 NCAA Division I men's basketball season. The Demon Deacons, led by seventh-year head coach Steve Forbes, play their home games at the Lawrence Joel Veterans Memorial Coliseum in Winston-Salem, North Carolina as members of the Atlantic Coast Conference.

== Previous season ==
The Demon Deacons finished the season 18–17 and 7–11 in ACC play to finish in thirteenth place. As the thirteenth seed in the 2026 ACC tournament, they defeated Virginia Tech in the First Round in overtime. They were defeated by fifth-seed Clemson in the Second Round. They accepted an exempt bid to the NIT. They were the first seed in their quadrant of the bracket. They defeated Navy by ten points before losing to fourth-seed Illinois State in the Second Round by three points to end their season.

== Offseason ==
=== Departures ===
Departures
Name	No.	Pos.	Height	Weight	Year	Hometown	Reason for departure
Omaha Biliew	0	F	6'8"	230	Junior	Waukee, IA	Transferred to Grand Canyon
Nate Calmese	1	G	6'2"	181	Senior	Gilbert, AZ	Completed eligibility
Juke Harris	2	G	6'7"	200	Sophomore	Salisbury, NC	Transferred to Tennessee
Myles Colvin	6	G	6'5"	212	Junior	Indianapolis, IN	Transferred to Cincinnati
Mekhi Mason	8	G	6'5"	202	Senior	Gilbert, AZ	Transferred to San Jose State
Sebastian Akins	10	G	6'2"	175	Sophomore	Concord, NC	Transferred to Washington State
Marqus Marion	11	F	6'9"	220	Sophomore	Skovlunde, Denmark	Transferred to East Tennessee State
Cooper Schweiger	13	F	6'10"	235	Junior	Overland Park, KS	Transferred to Florida State
Jaylen Cross	23	F	6'4"	185	Freshman	Greensboro, NC	Transferred to Coastal Carolina
Tre'Von Spillers	25	F	6'7"	215	Senior	Charleston, SC	Completed eligibility
Dimitrije Kovacevic	33	F	6'8"	215	Freshman	Doboj, Bosnia and Herzegovina	Transferred to Mercer
Owen Kmety	44	F	6'7"	210	Senior	Chicago, IL	Completed eligibility

=== Incoming transfers ===
Incoming transfers
Name	No.	Pos.	Height	Weight	Year	Hometown	Previous school
Justin Ray	1	G	6'2"	185	Junior	Greer, SC	Monmouth
Vincent Chaudhri	2	F	6'8"	190	Freshman	Wallkill, NY	George Washington
Ring Nyeri	8	F	6'9"	185	Junior	Peoria, AZ	Northern Colorado
Justin Abson	10	F	6'9"	250	Graduate Student	Coconut Creek, FL	Georgia
Jamari McDowell	11	G	6'5"	195	Junior	Houston, TX	Kansas
Xander Pintleon	17	F	6'11"	230	Senior	Oostkamp, Belgium	Florida Atlantic
Kevair Kennedy	55	G	6'2"	175	Sophomore	Philadelphia, PA	Merrimack
Antonio Dorn	77	C	7'0"	255	Junior	Hamburg, Germany	Virginia Tech

=== 2025 recruiting class ===
College recruiting
Name	Hometown	School	Height	Weight	Commit date
Gallagher Placide; F	Aurora, CO	Waxahachie Faith Family Academy	6 ft 9 in (2.06 m)	220 lb (100 kg)	Sep 18, 2025
Gallagher Placide; F	Recruit ratings: Rivals: 247Sports: ESPN: (83)				
Gavin Placide; F	Aurora, CO	Waxahachie Faith Family Academy	6 ft 11 in (2.11 m)	225 lb (102 kg)	Sep 18, 2025
Gavin Placide; F	Recruit ratings: Rivals: 247Sports: ESPN: (82)				
Lukas Bojovic; G	Ljubljana, Slovenia	Partizan Belgrade	6 ft 6 in (1.98 m)	205 lb (93 kg)	Jun 27, 2026
Lukas Bojovic; G	Recruit ratings: No ratings found				
Overall recruit ranking:
Note: In many cases, Scout, Rivals, 247Sports, On3, and ESPN may conflict in their listings of height and weight.; In these cases, the average was taken. ESPN grades are on a 100-point scale.; Sources: "Wake Forest Demon Deacons". ESPN.; "2026 Team Ranking". Rivals.

== Roster ==
2025–26 Wake Forest Demon Deacons men's basketball team
Players
Coaches

Pos.	#	Name	Height	Weight	Year	Previous school	Hometown
F	0	Gallagher Placide	6 ft 9 in (2.06 m)	220 lb (100 kg)	Fr	Waxahachie Faith Family Academy (TX)	Denver, CO
G	1	Justin Ray	6 ft 2 in (1.88 m)	185 lb (84 kg)	Jr	Monmouth	Greer, SC
F	2	Vincent Chaudhri	6 ft 8 in (2.03 m)	190 lb (86 kg)	RS Fr	George Washington	Wallkill, NY
F	4	Gavin Placide	6 ft 11 in (2.11 m)	225 lb (102 kg)	Fr	Waxahachie Faith Family Academy (TX)	Denver, CO
G	6	Lukas Bojovic	6 ft 6 in (1.98 m)	205 lb (93 kg)	Fr	Partizan Belgrade	Ljubljana, Slovenia
G	7	Isaac Carr	6 ft 4 in (1.93 m)	190 lb (86 kg)	So	Central Catholic High School (OR)	Portland, OR
F	8	Ring Nyeri	6 ft 9 in (2.06 m)	185 lb (84 kg)	Jr	Northern Colorado	Peoria, AZ
F	9	Vincent Ricchiuti	6 ft 6 in (1.98 m)	195 lb (88 kg)	Sr	St. Augustine High School (CA)	San Diego, CA
F	10	Justin Abson	6 ft 9 in (2.06 m)	250 lb (113 kg)	GS	Georgia	Coconut Creek, FL
G	11	Jamari McDowell	6 ft 5 in (1.96 m)	195 lb (88 kg)	RS Jr	Kansas	Houston, TX
F	17	Xander Pintleon	6 ft 11 in (2.11 m)	230 lb (104 kg)	Sr	Florida Atlantic	Oostkamp, Belgium
G	25	Will Underwood	6 ft 2 in (1.88 m)	185 lb (84 kg)	Sr	Mahtomedi High School (MN)	Mahtomedi, MN
G	30	Anson Beard Jr.	6 ft 5 in (1.96 m)	215 lb (98 kg)	So	Lawrenceville School (NJ)	New York, NY
G	45	Maddox Watson	6 ft 4 in (1.93 m)	195 lb (88 kg)	Jr	Southlake Christian Academy (NC)	Huntersville, NC
G	55	Kevair Kennedy	6 ft 2 in (1.88 m)	175 lb (79 kg)	So	Merrimack	Philadelphia, PA
C	77	Antonio Dorn	7 ft 0 in (2.13 m)	255 lb (116 kg)	Jr	Virginia Tech	Hamburg, Germany

Head coach

- Steve Forbes (Southern Arkansas)

Assistant coach(es)

- Nick Friedman (Miami (FL))
- Darnell Harris (Middle Tennessee)
- Antanas Kavaliauskas (Texas A&M)
- BJ McKie (South Carolina)
- Matt Woodley (Drake)

Legend

- (C) Team captain
- (S) Suspended
- (I) Ineligible
- (W) Walk-on
- Injured
- Current redshirt

Roster
Last update: October 5, 2026

== Schedule and results ==
Date time, TV	Rank^{#}	Opponent^{#}	Result	Record	High points	High rebounds	High assists	Site (attendance) city, state
Exhibition
October 4, 2026*; 12:30 p.m., ACCNX/ESPN+		Georgetown	L 77–94	–	19 – Kennedy	6 – Gal. Placide	4 – Tied	LJVM Coliseum; Winston-Salem, NC
October 15, 2026*; 6:00 p.m., Spiideo		vs. South Carolina	L 69–78	–	21 – Gav. Placide	6 – Kennedy	4 – Kennedy	Rock Hill Sports & Events Center (518); Rock Hill, SC
Non-conference regular season
November 2, 2026*; 8:00 p.m., ACCNX		Maryland Eastern Shore	W 83–62	1–0	20 – Gav. Placide	9 – Kennedy	8 – Kennedy	LJVM Coliseum (7,119); Winston-Salem, NC
November 5, 2026*; 6:00 p.m., ESPN2		at No. 24 Vanderbilt	L 51–74	1–1	20 – Kennedy	8 – Tied	3 – McDowell	Memorial Gymnasium (7,240); Nashville, TN
November 10, 2026*; 7:00 p.m., ACCNX		Charleston Southern	W 82–64	2–1	15 – Tied	8 – Tied	2 – Tied	LJVM Coliseum (6,311); Winston-Salem, NC
November 14, 2026*; 4:00 p.m., ACCNX		Southern Utah	W 89–51	3–1	23 – Kennedy	10 – Kennedy	7 – Kennedy	LJVM Coliseum (6,206); Winston-Salem, NC
November 17, 2026*; 7:00 p.m., ACCNX		Monmouth						LJVM Coliseum; Winston-Salem, NC
November 21, 2026*; TBA, ACCNX		Western Carolina						LJVM Coliseum; Winston-Salem, NC
November 25, 2026*; 7:30 p.m., ESPN2		vs. Mississippi State; Battle 4 Atlantis First Round						Imperial Arena; Paradise Island, The Bahamas
November 27, 2026*; 1:30 p.m. / 7:30 p.m.		vs. Penn State/Memphis; Battle 4 Atlantis Semifinals/Consolation Second Round						Imperial Arena; Paradise Island, The Bahamas
December 1, 2026*; 9:00 p.m., SECN		at LSU; ACC–SEC Challenge						Pete Maravich Assembly Center; Baton Rouge, LA
December 6, 2026*; 1:00 p.m., ESPNU		vs. UMass; Basketball Hall of Fame Classic						MassMutual Center; Springfield, MA
December 8, 2026*; 7:00 p.m.		Hampton						LJVM Coliseum; Winston-Salem, NC
December 15, 2026*; 9:00 p.m.		Gardner–Webb						LJVM Coliseum; Winston-Salem, NC
December 19, 2026*; 3:30 p.m.		vs. West Virginia; Holiday Hoopfest						First Horizon Coliseum; Greensboro, NC
December 22, 2026*; 4:00 p.m.		Presbyterian						LJVM Coliseum; Winston-Salem, NC
ACC regular season
January 2, 2027; 3:30 p.m.		Virginia Tech						LVVM Coliseum; Winston-Salem, NC
January 5, 2027; 7:00 p.m.		at SMU						Moody Coliseum; University Park, TX
January 9, 2027; 12:00 p.m.		at Clemson						Littlejohn Coliseum; Clemson, SC
January 12, 2027; 7:00 p.m.		Notre Dame						LJVM Coliseum; Winston-Salem, NC
January 16, 2027; 4:30 p.m.		Florida State						LJVM Coliseum; Winston-Salem, NC
January 20, 2027; 9:00 p.m.		Duke						LJVM Coliseum; Winston-Salem, NC
January 23, 2027; 12:00 p.m.		at NC State; Rivalry						Lenovo Center; Raleigh, NC
January 30, 2027; 12:00 p.m.		at Miami						Watsco Center; Coral Gables, FL
February 2, 2027; 6:00 p.m.		Boston College						LJVM Coliseum; Winston-Salem, NC
February 6, 2027; 3:00 p.m.		at Louisville						KFC Yum! Center; Louisville, KY
February 10, 2027; 7:00 p.m.		NC State; Rivalry						LJVM Coliseum; Winston-Salem, NC
February 13, 2027; 7:00 p.m.		Pittsburgh						LJVM Coliseum; Winston-Salem, NC
February 17, 2027; 9:00 p.m.		at Notre Dame						Joyce Center; South Bend, IN
February 20, 2027; 7:00 p.m.		North Carolina; Rivalry						LJVM Coliseum; Winston-Salem, NC
February 24, 2027; 11:00 p.m.		at Stanford						Maples Pavilion; Stanford, CA
February 27, 2027; 4:30 p.m.		at California						Haas Pavilion; Berkeley, CA
March 3, 2027; 8:30 p.m.		Georgia Tech						LJVM Coliseum; Winston-Salem, NC
March 6, 2027; 5:30 p.m.		at Syracuse						JMA Wireless Dome; Syracuse, NY
ACC tournament
March 9–13, 2027*; TBA	(TBA)	vs. (TBA) TBA						First Horizon Coliseum; Greensboro, NC
*Non-conference game. ^{#}Rankings from AP poll. (#) Tournament seedings in parentheses. WS=Winston-Salem. All times are in Eastern Time.
