= 2026–27 Virginia Tech Hokies men's basketball team =

American college basketball season

2026–27 Virginia Tech Hokies men's basketball
- Conference: Atlantic Coast Conference
- Record: 5–0 (0–0 ACC)
- Head coach: Mike Young (8th season)
- Associate head coach: Chester Frazier (2nd, 4th overall season)
- Assistant coaches: J. D. Byers (4th season); David Moats (2nd season); Hunter Cattoor (1st season)
- Home arena: Cassell Coliseum

2026–27 ACC men's basketball standings
	Conf.				Overall
Team	W		L	PCT	W		L	PCT
No. 4 Virginia	0	–	0	–	5	–	0	1.000
Virginia Tech	0	–	0	–	5	–	0	1.000
Boston College	0	–	0	–	4	–	0	1.000
Georgia Tech	0	–	0	–	4	–	0	1.000
NC State	0	–	0	–	4	–	0	1.000
Notre Dame	0	–	0	–	4	–	0	1.000
Pittsburgh	0	–	0	–	4	–	0	1.000
SMU	0	–	0	–	4	–	0	1.000
Clemson	0	–	0	–	4	–	1	.800
No. 5 Duke	0	–	0	–	3	–	1	.750
Florida State	0	–	0	–	3	–	1	.750
No. 17 Miami (FL)	0	–	0	–	3	–	1	.750
North Carolina	0	–	0	–	3	–	1	.750
Stanford	0	–	0	–	3	–	1	.750
Wake Forest	0	–	0	–	3	–	1	.750
No. 23 Louisville	0	–	0	–	2	–	1	.667
California	0	–	0	–	3	–	2	.600
Syracuse	0	–	0	–	2	–	2	.500
† 2027 ACC tournament winner As of November 17, 2026; Rankings from AP poll

The 2026–27 Virginia Tech Hokies men's basketball team represents Virginia Tech during the 2026–27 NCAA Division I men's basketball season. The Hokies, led by eighth-year head coach Mike Young, play their home games at Cassell Coliseum in Blacksburg, Virginia, as members of the Atlantic Coast Conference.

== Previous season ==
The Hokies finished the season 19–13 and 8–10 in ACC play to finish in a tie for eleventh place. As the twelfth seed in the 2026 ACC tournament they faced thirteenth seed Wake Forest in the First Round, where they were defeated 85–89 in overtime. They were not invited to the NCAA tournament or the NIT.

== Offseason ==
=== Departures ===
Departures
Name	Number	Pos.	Height	Weight	Year	Hometown	Reason for departure
Jailen Bedford	0	G	6'4"	190	Graduate Student	Austin, Texas	Graduated
Tobi Lawal	1	F	6'8"	215	Senior	London, England	Graduated
Jaden Schutt	2	G	6'5"	200	(redshirt) Junior	Yorkville, Illinois	Transferred to Kansas State
Izaiah Pasha	4	G	6'5"	205	Sophomore	Harrisburg, Pennsylvania	Transferred to Duquesne
Brett Freeman	7	G	6'5"	180	Freshman	Bronx, New York	Transferred to Tarleton State
Neoklis Avdalas	17	G	6'9"	215	Freshman	Kalamata, Greece	Transferred to North Carolina
Christian Gurdak	32	C	6'10"	260	Freshman	Charles Town, West Virginia	Transferred to Rutgers
Antonio Dorn	77	C	7'0"	230	Freshman	Hamburg, Germany	Transferred to Wake Forest

=== Incoming transfers ===
Incoming transfers
Name	Number	Pos.	Height	Weight	Year	Hometown	Previous school
Jaylen Curry	0	G	6'1"	180	Senior	Charlotte, North Carolina	Oklahoma State
Ethan Copeland	1	G	6'2"	180	Senior	Sunnyside, Washington	Stetson
Isaiah Elohim	2	G	6'5"	208	Junior	Kingston, New York	Florida Atlantic
Ned Hull	4	G	6'3"	195	(redshirt) Junior	Charlotte, North Carolina	Elon
Miles Heide	6	F	6'10"	230	Senior	North Bend, Washington	San Diego State
Kuol Atak	7	F	6'9"	215	(redshirt) Sophomore	Haltom City, Texas	Oklahoma
Musa Sagnia	31	C	6'10"	230	Sophomore	Bakau, The Gambia	NC State

=== 2026 Recruiting class ===
College recruiting (2026)
Name	Hometown	School	Height	Weight	Commit date
Overall recruit ranking:
Note: In many cases, Scout, Rivals, 247Sports, On3, and ESPN may conflict in their listings of height and weight.; In these cases, the average was taken. ESPN grades are on a 100-point scale.; Sources: "Virginia Tech". ESPN.; "2026 Team Ranking". Rivals.; "2026 Virginia Tech Hokies Basketball Commits". On3.

== Roster ==
2026–27 Virginia Tech Hokies men's basketball team
Players
Coaches

Pos.	#	Name	Height	Weight	Year	Previous school	Hometown
G	0	Jaylen Curry	6 ft 1 in (1.85 m)	180 lb (82 kg)	Sr	Oklahoma State	Charlotte, North Carolina
G	1	Ethan Copeland	6 ft 2 in (1.88 m)	180 lb (82 kg)	Sr	Stetson	Sunnyside, Washington
G	2	Isaiah Elohim	6 ft 5 in (1.96 m)	208 lb (94 kg)	Jr	Florida Atlantic	Kingston, New York
G	3	Ben Hammond	5 ft 11 in (1.8 m)	170 lb (77 kg)	Jr	Paul VI Catholic High School	Manassas, Virginia
G	4	Ned Hull	6 ft 3 in (1.91 m)	195 lb (88 kg)	RS Jr	Elon	Charlotte, North Carolina
F	5	Sin'Cere Jones	6 ft 7 in (2.01 m)	225 lb (102 kg)	So	Churchland High School	Portsmouth, Virginia
F	6	Miles Heide	6 ft 10 in (2.08 m)	230 lb (104 kg)	Sr	San Diego State	North Bend, Washington
F	7	Kuol Atak	6 ft 9 in (2.06 m)	215 lb (98 kg)	RS So	Oklahoma	Haltom City, Texas
G	8	Eltayeb Eltayeb	6 ft 8 in (2.03 m)	200 lb (91 kg)	Fr	Sunrise Christian Academy	Omdurman, Sudan
G	10	Tyler Johnson	6 ft 5 in (1.96 m)	208 lb (94 kg)	Jr	Oak Ridge High School	Orlando, Florida
G	11	James Caldarella	6 ft 3 in (1.91 m)	185 lb (84 kg)	Fr	Cheshire Academy	Barrington, Rhode Island
F	13	Amani Hansberry	6 ft 8 in (2.03 m)	240 lb (109 kg)	Sr	West Virginia	Silver Spring, Maryland
C	22	Solomon Davis	6 ft 11 in (2.11 m)	235 lb (107 kg)	RS Fr	DeMatha Catholic High School	Hyattsville, Maryland
C	31	Musa Sagnia	6 ft 10 in (2.08 m)	230 lb (104 kg)	So	NC State	Bakau, The Gambia
G	33	Butta Johnson	6 ft 4 in (1.93 m)	180 lb (82 kg)	Sr	Clemson	Huntsville, Alabama

Head coach

- Mike Young (Emory & Henry)

Assistant coach(es)

- Chester Frazier (Illinois)
- J. D. Byers (Lebanon Valley)
- David Moats (Wyoming)
- Hunter Cattoor (Virginia Tech)

Legend

- (C) Team captain
- (S) Suspended
- (I) Ineligible
- (W) Walk-on
- Injured
- Current redshirt

Roster
Last update: November 5, 2026

== Schedule and results ==
Date time, TV	Rank^{#}	Opponent^{#}	Result	Record	High points	High rebounds	High assists	Site (attendance) city, state
Non-conference regular season
November 3, 2026*; 7:00 p.m., ACCNX		Coppin State	W 88–54	1–0	20 – Hammond	9 – Hansberry	8 – Hammond	Cassell Coliseum (5,588); Blacksburg, VA
November 5, 2026*; 7:00 p.m., ACCNX		Mercer	W 96–67	2–0	23 – Hansberry	9 – T. Johnson	4 – Tied	Cassell Coliseum (5,060); Blacksburg, VA
November 10, 2026*; 7:00 p.m., FS1		vs. Iowa	W 93–88 ^{OT}	3–0	25 – Curry	6 – Elohim	4 – Hammond	Tyson Events Center (6,086); Sioux City, Iowa
November 13, 2026*; 7:00 p.m., ACCNX		Mount St. Mary's	W 82–62	4–0	20 – Hansberry	6 – Sagnia	8 – Hammond	Cassell Coliseum (6,638); Blacksburg, VA
November 16, 2026*; 7:00 p.m., ACCNX		Richmond	W 85–68	5–0	15 – Tied	11 – Johnson	7 – Hammond	Cassell Coliseum (5,604); Blacksburg, VA
November 20, 2026*; 3:00 p.m., ESPN2		vs. Northwestern; Shriners Children's Charleston Classic						TD Arena; Charleston, SC
November 22, 2026*; 3:30 p.m., ESPN		vs. Oklahoma State; Shriners Children's Charleston Classic						TD Arena; Charleston, SC
November 27, 2026*; 5:00 p.m., ACCNX		Old Dominion						Cassell Coliseum; Blacksburg, VA
December 1, 2026*; 9:00 p.m., ACCN		Ole Miss; ACC–SEC Challenge						Cassell Coliseum; Blacksburg, VA
December 5, 2026*; 4:30 p.m., FS1		at West Virginia						Hope Coliseum; Morgantown, WV
December 10, 2026*; 7:00 p.m., ACCN		Maryland Eastern Shore						Cassell Coliseum; Blacksburg, VA
December 13, 2026*; 1:00 p.m., ACCNX		Radford						Cassell Coliseum; Blacksburg, VA
December 19, 2026*; 4:30 p.m.		vs. UCF						Rick Case Arena; Fort Lauderdale
December 21, 2026*; 6:00 p.m., ACCNX		VMI						Cassell Coliseum; Blacksburg, VA
ACC regular season
December 30, 2026; 8:00 p.m., The CW		Louisville						Cassell Coliseum; Blacksburg, VA
January 2, 2027; 3:30 p.m., ACCN		at Wake Forest						LJVM Coliseum; Winston-Salem, NC
January 6, 2027; 7:00 p.m., ACCN		at Notre Dame						Purcell Pavilion; Notre Dame, IN
January 9, 2027; 8:00 p.m., ACCN		Boston College						Cassell Coliseum; Blacksburg, VA
January 16, 2027; 12:00 p.m., The CW		SMU						Cassell Coliseum; Blacksburg, VA
January 20, 2027; 7:00 p.m., ACCN		at Florida State						Donald L. Tucker Civic Center; Tallahassee/ FL
January 23, 2027; 6:00 p.m., ESPN/ESPN2/ESPNU		Miami						Cassell Coliseum; Blacksburg, VA
January 27, 2027; 9:00 p.m., ESPNU		at Pittsburgh						Petersen Events Center; Pittsburgh, PA
January 30, 2027; 6:00 p.m., ESPNU		at Virginia; Rivalry						John Paul Jones Arena; Charlottesville
February 2, 2027; 8:00 p.m., ACCN		Clemson						Cassell Coliseum; Blacksburg, VA
February 10, 2027; 9:00 p.m., ACCN		at California						Haas Pavilion; Berkeley, California
February 13, 2027; 4:30 p.m., ACCN		at Stanford						Maples Pavilion; Stanford, California
February 17, 2027; 7:00 p.m., ESPN2 or ESPNU		NC State						Cassell Coliseum; Blacksburg, VA
February 20, 2027; 12:00 p.m., ACCN		at Boston College						Conte Forum; Chestnut Hill, MA
February 23, 2027; 7:00 p.m., ESPN2 or ESPNU		Virginia; Rivalry						Cassell Coliseum; Blacksburg, VA
February 27, 2027; 7:00 p.m., ACCN		North Carolina						Cassell Coliseum; Blacksburg, VA
March 3, 2027; 9:00 p.m., ESPN2 or ESPNU		Syracuse						Cassell Coliseum; Blacksburg, VA
March 6, 2027; 12:00 p.m., ACCN		at Georgia Tech						McCamish Pavilion; Atlanta, GA
ACC Tournament
March 9th-13th, 2027; TBD, TBD		vs. TBD; ACC Tournament						First Horizon Coliseum; Greensboro, North Carolina
*Non-conference game. ^{#}Rankings from AP poll. (#) Tournament seedings in parentheses. All times are in Eastern Time.
