= 2026–27 Clemson Tigers men's basketball team =

American college basketball season

2026–27 Clemson Tigers men's basketball
- Conference: Atlantic Coast Conference
- Record: 4–1 (0–0 ACC)
- Head coach: Brad Brownell (17th season)
- Assistant coaches: Chris Harriman (1st season); Chris Hollender (1st season); Andre Morgan (1st season); Chad Warner (1st season)
- Home arena: Littlejohn Coliseum (Capacity: 9,000)

2026–27 ACC men's basketball standings
	Conf.				Overall
Team	W		L	PCT	W		L	PCT
No. 4 Virginia	0	–	0	–	6	–	0	1.000
Boston College	0	–	0	–	5	–	0	1.000
Georgia Tech	0	–	0	–	5	–	0	1.000
NC State	0	–	0	–	5	–	0	1.000
Pittsburgh	0	–	0	–	5	–	0	1.000
SMU	0	–	0	–	5	–	0	1.000
Virginia Tech	0	–	0	–	5	–	0	1.000
Notre Dame	0	–	0	–	6	–	1	.857
Stanford	0	–	0	–	5	–	1	.833
Clemson	0	–	0	–	4	–	1	.800
Florida State	0	–	0	–	4	–	1	.800
No. 17 Miami (FL)	0	–	0	–	4	–	1	.800
Wake Forest	0	–	0	–	4	–	1	.800
No. 23 Louisville	0	–	0	–	3	–	1	.750
North Carolina	0	–	0	–	3	–	1	.750
California	0	–	0	–	4	–	2	.667
No. 5 Duke	0	–	0	–	3	–	2	.600
Syracuse	0	–	0	–	3	–	2	.600
† 2027 ACC tournament winner As of November 20, 2026; Rankings from AP poll

The 2026–27 Clemson Tigers men's basketball team represent Clemson University during the 2026–27 NCAA Division I men's basketball season. The Tigers are led by seventeen-year head coach Brad Brownell, and play their home games at Littlejohn Coliseum in Clemson, South Carolina as members of the Atlantic Coast Conference.

== Previous season ==
The Tigers finished the previous season with a 24–11 overall record, going 12–6 in conference play to finish fourth in the standings. The 25–26 season was highlighted by winning ten out of their first eleven conference games, during which they rose to as high as No. 18 in the AP poll. However, the Tigers proceeded to lose five out of their last seven games to enter the ACC tournament as the fifth seed. The team won against Wake Forest in the second-round and North Carolina in the quarterfinals before losing to top-seed Duke in the semifinals. The Tigers were invited to participate in the NCAA tournament, entering as an eight seed. They proceeded to lose to Iowa in the first round, concluding their season.

== Roster ==
2026–27 Clemson Tigers men's basketball team
Players
Coaches

Pos.	#	Name	Height	Weight	Year	Previous school	Hometown
G	0	Cole Certa	6 ft 5 in (1.96 m)	200 lb (91 kg)	Jr	Notre Dame	Le Roy, IL
G	2	Harris Reynolds	6 ft 5 in (1.96 m)	180 lb (82 kg)	Fr	St. Pius X Catholic HS	Atlanta, GA
F	3	Chase Thompson	6 ft 9 in (2.06 m)	230 lb (104 kg)	So	Alexandria Area HS	Glenwood, MN
F	4	Blake Davidson	6 ft 11 in (2.11 m)	225 lb (102 kg)	So	Mater Dei HS	Mission Viejo, CA
G	5	Zac Foster	6 ft 4 in (1.93 m)	190 lb (86 kg)	So	Woodward Academy	Atlanta, GA
G	7	Amare James	6 ft 5 in (1.96 m)	190 lb (86 kg)	Fr	Wheeler HS	Marietta, GA
F	8	David Fuchs	6 ft 10 in (2.08 m)	250 lb (113 kg)	Sr	San Francisco	Vienna, Austria
F	11	Dallas Thomas	6 ft 9 in (2.06 m)	190 lb (86 kg)	Jr	Parkview HS	Little Rock, AR
F	15	Dylan Faulkner	6 ft 10 in (2.08 m)	235 lb (107 kg)	Sr	Samford	Calhoun, GA
G	21	Ace Buckner	6 ft 3 in (1.91 m)	180 lb (82 kg)	Jr	La Lumiere School	Dallas, TX
F/C	22	Carter Welling	6 ft 11 in (2.11 m)	240 lb (109 kg)	Sr	Utah Valley	Draper, UT
C	25	Will Stevens	6 ft 11 in (2.11 m)	225 lb (102 kg)	Fr	Davidson Day School	Huntersville, NC
C	44	Trent Steinour	6 ft 11 in (2.11 m)	230 lb (104 kg)	So	Lake Norman HS	Huntersville, NC
F	45	Liutaurus Lelevicius	6 ft 9 in (2.06 m)	225 lb (102 kg)	Sr	TCU	Kaunas, Lithuania

Head coach

- Brad Brownell (DePauw)

Assistant coach(es)

- Chris Harriman (Augusta)
- Chris Hollender (Evansville)
- Andre Morgan (North Georgia)
- Chad Warner (Georgia)

Legend

- (C) Team captain
- (S) Suspended
- (I) Ineligible
- (W) Walk-on
- Injured
- Current redshirt

Roster

== Schedule ==
Date time, TV	Rank^{#}	Opponent^{#}	Result	Record	High points	High rebounds	High assists	Site (attendance) city, state
Exhibition
October 23, 2026*; 6:30 p.m.		Georgia	W 82–80	–	19 – Catchings	8 – Scott	4 – Millender	Littlejohn Coliseum (6,435); Clemson, SC
October 28, 2026*; 7:00 p.m.		Presbyterian	W 84–70	–	15 – Peterson	6 – Peterson	4 – Taylor	Littlejohn Coliseum (1,247); Clemson, SC
Non-conference regular season
November 2, 2026*; 7:00 p.m., ACCNX		Stetson	W 85–72	1–0	20 – Buckner	11 – Faulkner	6 – Certa	Littlejohn Coliseum (6,254); Clemson, SC
November 6, 2026*; 7:00 p.m., ACCNX		American	W 82–73	2–0	26 – Buckner	6 – Buckner	10 – Lelevicius	Littlejohn Coliseum (6,103); Clemson, SC
November 9, 2026*; 7:00 p.m., ACCNX		North Dakota	W 92–77	3–0	21 – Tied	8 – Lelevicius	8 – Faulkner	Littlejohn Coliseum (5,671); Clemson, SC
November 13, 2026*; 6:00 p.m., ESPNU		Georgetown	L 78–85	3–1	20 – Buckner	5 – Tied	5 – Buckner	Littlejohn Coliseum (7,434); Clemson, SC
November 16, 2026*; 7:00 p.m., ACCN		The Citadel	W 87–51	4–1	20 – Certa	9 – Faulkner	6 – Buckner	Littlejohn Coliseum (5,358); Clemson, SC
November 23, 2026*; 2:30 p.m., ESPN2		vs. Ole Miss; Maui Invitational quarterfinal						Lahaina Civic Center; Lahaina, HI
November 24, 2026*; TBD		vs. Washington/BYU; Maui Invitational						Lahaina Civic Center; Lahaina, HI
November 25, 2026*; TBD		vs. TBD; Maui Invitational elimination game						Lahaina Civic Center; Lahaina, HI
December 1, 2026*; 7:00 p.m., ESPNU		Auburn; ACC–SEC Challenge						Littlejohn Coliseum; Clemson, SC
December 6, 2026*; 1:00 p.m., ACCNX		Le Moyne						Littlejohn Coliseum; Clemson, SC
December 12, 2026*; 4:30 p.m., ESPN2		at TCU						Schollmaier Arena; Fort Worth, TX
December 15, 2026*; 9:00 p.m., ESPN2		at South Carolina; Palmetto Series						Colonial Life Arena; Columbia, SC
December 19, 2026*; 9:00 p.m., ESPNU		vs. Cincinnati						Heritage Bank Center; Cincinnati, OH
December 22, 2026*; 2:00 p.m., ACCNX		Colgate						Littlejohn Coliseum; Clemson, SC
ACC regular season
December 29, 2026; 6:00 p.m., ESPN2		Virginia						Littlejohn Coliseum; Clemson, SC
January 2, 2027; 1:00 p.m., ACCN		at NC State						Lenovo Center; Raleigh, NC
January 5, 2027; 9:00 p.m., ACCN		at Boston College						Conte Forum; Chestnut Hill, MA
January 9, 2027; 12:00 p.m., The CW		Wake Forest						Littlejohn Coliseum; Clemson, SC
January 12, 2027; 9:00 p.m., ESPN/ESPN2		Georgia Tech						Littlejohn Coliseum; Clemson, SC
January 16, 2027; 4:00 p.m., ESPN/ESPN2		at Pittsburgh						Petersen Events Center; Pittsburgh, PA
January 23, 2027; 12:00 p.m., ESPN/ESPN2/ESPNU		Florida State						Littlejohn Coliseum; Clemson, SC
January 27, 2027; 7:00 p.m., ESPN2/ESPNU		at Miami						Watsco Center; Coral Gables, FL
January 30, 2027; TBD, ESPN/ESPN2		Duke						Littlejohn Coliseum; Clemson, SC
February 2, 2027; 8:00 p.m., ACCN		at Virginia Tech						Cassell Coliseum; Blacksburg, VA
February 6, 2027; 12:00 p.m., The CW		California						Littlejohn Coliseum; Clemson, SC
February 10, 2027; 7:00 p.m., ESPN2/ESPNU		Syracuse						Littlejohn Coliseum; Clemson, SC
February 13, 2027; 3:15 p.m., The CW		at Florida State						Donald L. Tucker Center; Tallahassee, FL
February 16, 2027; 7:00 p.m., ESPNU		at Georgia Tech						McCamish Pavilion; Atlanta, GA
February 20, 2027; 12:00 p.m., ESPN2		Stanford						Littlejohn Coliseum; Clemson, SC
February 23, 2027; 10:00 p.m., ACCN		at SMU						Moody Coliseum; Dallas, TX
March 2, 2027; 7:00 p.m., ESPN2/ESPNU/ACCN		Notre Dame						Littlejohn Coliseum; Clemson, SC
March 6, 2027; 12:00 p.m., ESPN/ESPNU		at Louisville						KFC Yum! Center; Louisville, KY
ACC Tournament
TBD; TBD		vs. TBD						First Horizon Coliseum; Greensboro, NC
*Non-conference game. ^{#}Rankings from AP poll. (#) Tournament seedings in parentheses. All times are in Eastern Time.
