= 2026–27 Virginia Cavaliers men's basketball team =

American men's college basketball season

2026–27 Virginia Cavaliers men's basketball
- Conference: Atlantic Coast Conference

Ranking
- Coaches: No. 5
- AP: No. 4
- Record: 7–0 (0–0 ACC)
- Head coach: Ryan Odom (2nd season)
- Associate head coach: Adrian Autry (1st season)
- Assistant coaches: Matt Henry (2nd season); Bryce Crawford (2nd season); Darius Theus (2nd season)
- Home arena: John Paul Jones Arena

2026–27 ACC men's basketball standings
	Conf.				Overall
Team	W		L	PCT	W		L	PCT
No. 4 Virginia	0	–	0	–	7	–	0	1.000
Pittsburgh	0	–	0	–	6	–	0	1.000
SMU	0	–	0	–	6	–	0	1.000
Virginia Tech	0	–	0	–	6	–	0	1.000
Boston College	0	–	0	–	5	–	0	1.000
Notre Dame	0	–	0	–	6	–	1	.857
Florida State	0	–	0	–	5	–	1	.833
Georgia Tech	0	–	0	–	5	–	1	.833
No. 17 Miami (FL)	0	–	0	–	5	–	1	.833
NC State	0	–	0	–	5	–	1	.833
Stanford	0	–	0	–	5	–	1	.833
Clemson	0	–	0	–	4	–	1	.800
North Carolina	0	–	0	–	4	–	1	.800
Wake Forest	0	–	0	–	4	–	1	.800
No. 23 Louisville	0	–	0	–	3	–	1	.750
California	0	–	0	–	4	–	2	.667
No. 5 Duke	0	–	0	–	3	–	2	.600
Syracuse	0	–	0	–	3	–	2	.600
† 2027 ACC tournament winner As of November 21, 2026; Rankings from AP poll

The 2026–27 Virginia Cavaliers men's basketball team represents the University of Virginia (UVA) during the 2026–27 NCAA Division I men's basketball season and is led by second-year head coach Ryan Odom. The team plays its home games at John Paul Jones Arena in Charlottesville, Virginia, as a member of the Atlantic Coast Conference (ACC).

== Previous season ==
The Cavaliers finished the season 30–6 overall and 15–3 in ACC play to finish in second place. As the second seed in the ACC Tournament, they earned a double-bye into the quarterfinals, where they defeated seventh seed NC State. They advanced over third-seeded Miami (FL) in the semifinals. They did not win the tournament, as they lost to top seed and top-ranked Duke in the final, 70–74. The Cavaliers earned an at-large bid to the NCAA tournament and were the three-seed in the Midwest region. They were ranked ninth in the AP Poll released prior to the tournament. They defeated fourteen-seed Wright State in the first round before being upset by six-seed and twenty-third ranked Tennessee by six points to end their season.

== Offseason ==
=== Coaching departures ===
Virginia coaching departures
Name	Position	Years on staff	New position

=== Player departures ===
Virginia player departures
Name	Number	Pos.	Height	Weight	Year	Hometown	Reason for departure

=== Coaching arrivals ===
Virginia coaching arrivals
Name	Previous position	Previous school	New position

=== Incoming transfers ===
Virginia incoming transfers
Name	Number	Pos.	Height	Weight	Year	Hometown	Previous school	Remaining years of eligibility

=== 2026 recruiting class ===
College recruiting (2026)
Name	Hometown	School	Height	Weight	Commit date
			N/A	N/A	
Recruit ratings: No ratings found
Overall recruit ranking: Rivals: 49 247Sports: 40 ESPN: –
Note: In many cases, Scout, Rivals, 247Sports, On3, and ESPN may conflict in their listings of height and weight.; In these cases, the average was taken. ESPN grades are on a 100-point scale.; Sources: "Virginia 2025 Basketball Commitments". Rivals.; "2026 Virginia Commits". Scout.; "2026 Player Commits". ESPN.; "Scout.com Team Recruiting Rankings". Scout.; "2026 Team Ranking". Rivals.; "Virginia 2026 Basketball Commitments". 247Sports.

== Roster ==
2026–27 Virginia Cavaliers men's basketball team
Players
Coaches

Pos.	#	Name	Height	Weight	Year	Previous school	Hometown
G	00	Owen Odom	6 ft 1 in (1.85 m)	175 lb (79 kg)	So	Collegiate School	Annapolis, Maryland
G	1	Chance Mallory	5 ft 10 in (1.78 m)	170 lb (77 kg)	So	St. Anne's-Belfield School	Charlottesville, Virginia
G	2	Christian Harmon	6 ft 6 in (1.98 m)	215 lb (98 kg)	Sr	Arkansas State	Rochester, New York
G	4	Jurian Dixon	6 ft 4 in (1.93 m)	205 lb (93 kg)	Sr	UC Irvine	San Diego, California
G	5	Sam Lewis	6 ft 7 in (2.01 m)	216 lb (98 kg)	Sr	Toledo	Chicago, Illinois
F	6	Kalu Anya (5th)	6 ft 8 in (2.03 m)	225 lb (102 kg)	Sr	Saint Louis	Worcester, Massachusetts
G/F	7	Martin Carrere	6 ft 9 in (2.06 m)	212 lb (96 kg)	Jr	VCU	Pontonx-sur-l'Adour, France
G	8	Nick Rotter	6 ft 2 in (1.88 m)	200 lb (91 kg)	Jr	Latin School of Chicago	Chicago, Illinois
G	11	Quincy Watson	5 ft 11 in (1.8 m)	175 lb (79 kg)	Fr	Loyola High School	Pacific Palisades, California
G	12	Elijah Gertrude	6 ft 4 in (1.93 m)	188 lb (85 kg)	Sr	Hudson Catholic Regional High School	Jersey City, New Jersey
G	13	Desmond Roberts	6 ft 4 in (1.93 m)	205 lb (93 kg)	Sr	St. Anne's-Belfield School	Charlottesville, Virginia
C	17	Johann Grünloh	7 ft 0 in (2.13 m)	250 lb (113 kg)	So	SC Rasta Vechta	Löningen, Germany
F	21	Silas Barksdale	6 ft 9 in (2.06 m)	232 lb (105 kg)	So	Woodside High School	Newport News, Virginia
F	22	Nolan Adekunle	6 ft 7 in (2.01 m)	225 lb (102 kg)	Fr	Gladiators Trier	Berlin, Germany
F	28	Thijs De Ridder	6 ft 9 in (2.06 m)	246 lb (112 kg)	So	Bilbao Basket	Brasschaat, Belgium
C	34	Favour Ibe	7 ft 7 in (2.31 m)	248 lb (112 kg)	Fr	Mt. Zion Prep	Lagos, Nigeria
F	35	Carter Lang	6 ft 9 in (2.06 m)	250 lb (113 kg)	Sr	Vanderbilt	Charlottesville, Virginia
G	37	Jan Vide	6 ft 6 in (1.98 m)	205 lb (93 kg)	Sr	Loyola Marymount	Domžale, Slovenia

Head coach

- Ryan Odom (Hampden–Sydney)

Assistant coach(es)

- Adrian Autry (Syracuse)
- Matt Henry (Trinity)
- Bryce Crawford (Ohio State)
- Darius Theus (VCU)

Legend

- (C) Team captain
- (S) Suspended
- (I) Ineligible
- (W) Walk-on
- (5th) Fifth-year senior
- Injured
- Current redshirt

Roster
Last update: October 30, 2026

=== Coaches ===
Virginia coaching staff
Name	Position	Year with position	Year on coaching staff	Alma mater	Nationality
Ryan Odom	Dean and Markel Families head coach	1	1	Hampden–Sydney	United States
Griff Aldrich	Associate head coach	1	1	Hampden–Sydney	United States
Matt Henry	Assistant coach	1	1	Trinity	United States
Bryce Crawford	Assistant coach	1	1	Ohio State	United States
Darius Theus	Assistant coach	1	1	VCU	United States
Kelsey Knoche	Director of operations	1	1	Maryland	United States
Matt Hart	Director of analytics	1	1	George Washington	United States
Billy Bales	Video coordinator	1	1	Lenoir-Rhyne	United States
Ahmad Thomas	Director of recruiting	1	1	UNC Asheville	United States
Michael Crowder	Director of culture and alumni engagement	1	1	Virginia	United States
Mike Curtis	Strength and conditioning coach	17	17	Virginia	United States
Ethan Saliba	Head athletic trainer	28	43	Kansas	United States

== Schedule and results ==
Date time, TV	Rank^{#}	Opponent^{#}	Result	Record	High points	High rebounds	High assists	Site (attendance) city, state
Exhibition
September 27, 2026*		vs. Vanderbilt	L 73–82	—	–	–	–	Credit One Stadium; Charleston, South Carolina
October 9, 2026*; 7:00 p.m.		Richmond	W 96–53	—	12 – Tied	9 – Grunloh	5 – Lewis	John Paul Jones Arena (11,847); Charlottesville, Virginia
October 22, 2026*; 7:00 p.m.	No. 9	at Villanova	W 93–71	—	17 – De Ridder	5 – Mallory	4 – Lewis	Finneran Pavilion (5,094); Villanova, Pennsylvania
Non-Conference Regular season
November 3, 2026*; 7:30 p.m., ACCN	No. 9	Drexel	W 89–60	1–0	24 – De Ridder	9 – Tied	3 – Tied	John Paul Jones Arena (12,487); Charlottesville, Virginia
November 6, 2026*; 5:00 p.m., ACCN	No. 9	Northeastern	W 97–72	2–0	20 – Tied	6 – De Ridder	5 – Mallory	John Paul Jones Arena (12,620); Charlottesville, Virginia
November 8, 2026*; 1:00 p.m., ESPN	No. 9	vs. No. 12 Arkansas; Capital Showcase	W 91–72	3–0	16 – Tied	10 – De Ridder	6 – Mallory	Capital One Arena (10,977); Washington, D.C.
November 10, 2026*; 9:00 p.m., ACCN	No. 6	Bucknell	W 95–61	4–0	16 – Mallory	9 – Grunloh	7 – Gertrude	John Paul Jones Arena (11,832); Charlottesville, Virginia
November 13, 2026*; 8:00 p.m., NBCSN/Peacock	No. 6	at Maryland	W 87–83	5–0	28 – Lewis	7 – Tied	4 – Mallory	XFINITY Center (16,908); College Park, Maryland
November 17, 2026*; 9:00 p.m., ACCN	No. 4	Old Dominion	W 85–65	6–0	20 – De Ridder	10 – Tied	6 – Mallory	John Paul Jones Arena (11,742); Charlottesville, Virginia
November 20, 2026*; 7:00 p.m., ACCN	No. 4	Loyola Maryland	W 103–61	7–0	20 – Lewis	7 – Grunloh	6 – Mallory	John Paul Jones Arena (12,473); Charlottesville, Virginia
November 25, 2026*; 12:00 p.m., ESPN		vs. Marquette; Battle 4 Atlantis Bracket 2 Game 1						Imperial Arena; Pardise Island, Bahamas
November 27, 2026*; 11:00 a.m., ESPN2		vs. Xavier; Battle 4 Atlantis Bracket 2 Game 2						Imperial Arena; Paradise Island, Bahamas
December 2, 2026*; 7:15 p.m., ESPN		Kentucky; ACC–SEC Challenge						John Paul Jones Arena; Charlottesville, Virginia
December 8, 2026*; 7:00 p.m., ACCN		Bethune-Cookman						John Paul Jones Arena; Charlottesville, Virginia
December 13, 2026*; 12:00 p.m., The CW		Western Carolina						John Paul Jones Arena; Charlottesville, Virginia
December 20, 2026*; 3:00 p.m., ESPN		vs. UConn; SentinelOne Showdown						Madison Square Garden; New York, New York
ACC Regular season
December 29, 2027; 6:00 p.m., ESPN2		at Clemson conference road opener						Littlejohn Coliseum; Clemson, South Carolina
January 2, 2027; 6:00 p.m., ESPN		SMU conference home opener						John Paul Jones Arena; Charlottesville, Virginia
January 6, 2027; 9:00 p.m., ACCN		at Stanford						Maples Pavilion; Stanford, California
January 9, 2027; 4:00 p.m., ESPNU		at California						Haas Pavilion; Berkeley, California
January 13, 2027; 8:00 p.m., The CW		Boston College						John Paul Jones Arena; Charlottesville, Virginia
January 16, 2027; 6:00 p.m., ESPN or ESPN2		at Miami (FL)						Watsco Center; Coral Gables, Florida
January 19, 2027; 9:00 p.m., ESPN		at North Carolina						Dean Smith Center; Chapel Hill, North Carolina
January 27, 2027; 8:00 p.m., The CW		Georgia Tech						John Paul Jones Arena; Charlottesville, Virginia
January 30, 2027; 6:00 p.m., ESPNU		Virginia Tech; Rivalry						John Paul Jones Arena; Charlottesville, Virginia
February 3, 2027; 9:00 p.m., ESPN2		at Syracuse						JMA Wireless Dome; Syracuse, New York
February 6, 2027; 6:00 or 6:30 p.m., ESPN		Duke						John Paul Jones Arena; Charlottesville, Virginia
February 13, 2027; 7:00 p.m., ACCN		at Pittsburgh						Petersen Events Center; Pittsburgh, Pennsylvania
February 15, 2027; 2:00 p.m., ACCN		Notre Dame						John Paul Jones Arena; Charlottesville, Virginia
February 23, 2027; 7:00 p.m., ESPN		Louisville						John Paul Jones Arena; Charlottesville, Virginia
February 23, 2027; 7:00 p.m., ESPN2 or ESPNU		at Virginia Tech; Rivalry						Cassell Coliseum; Blacksburg, Virginia
February 27, 2027; 2:00 p.m., ESPN or ESPN2		Florida State						John Paul Jones Arena; Charlottesville, Virginia
March 1, 2027; 7:00 p.m., ESPN		at Duke						Cameron Indoor Stadium; Durham, North Carolina
March 6, 2027; 12:00 p.m., The CW		NC State; Senior Day						John Paul Jones Arena; Charlottesville, Virginia
ACC Tournament
March 9th-13th, 2027; TBD, TBD		vs. TBD; ACC Tournament						First Horizon Coliseum; Greensboro, North Carolina
*Non-conference game. ^{#}Rankings from AP poll. (#) Tournament seedings in parentheses. All times are in Eastern Time.

== Rankings ==
Ranking movements Legend: ██ Increase in ranking ██ Decrease in ranking
	Week																				
Poll	Pre	1	2	3	4	5	6	7	8	9	10	11	12	13	14	15	16	17	18	19	Final
AP	9	6	4																		
Coaches	10	6	5																		
