= 2026–27 Boston College Eagles men's basketball team =

American college basketball season

2026–27 Boston College Eagles men's basketball
- Conference: Atlantic Coast Conference
- Record: 5–0 (0–0 ACC)
- Head coach: Luke Murray (1st season)
- Assistant coaches: Kyle Griffin (1st season); Matthew Johnson (1st season); Brenden Straughn (1st season)
- Home arena: Conte Forum

2026–27 ACC men's basketball standings
	Conf.				Overall
Team	W		L	PCT	W		L	PCT
No. 4 Virginia	0	–	0	–	6	–	0	1.000
Boston College	0	–	0	–	5	–	0	1.000
Georgia Tech	0	–	0	–	5	–	0	1.000
Virginia Tech	0	–	0	–	5	–	0	1.000
Pittsburgh	0	–	0	–	5	–	0	1.000
SMU	0	–	0	–	5	–	0	1.000
NC State	0	–	0	–	4	–	0	1.000
Notre Dame	0	–	0	–	5	–	1	.833
Clemson	0	–	0	–	4	–	1	.800
Florida State	0	–	0	–	4	–	1	.800
No. 17 Miami (FL)	0	–	0	–	4	–	1	.800
Stanford	0	–	0	–	4	–	1	.800
Wake Forest	0	–	0	–	4	–	1	.800
North Carolina	0	–	0	–	3	–	1	.750
No. 23 Louisville	0	–	0	–	2	–	1	.667
California	0	–	0	–	3	–	2	.600
No. 5 Duke	0	–	0	–	3	–	2	.600
Syracuse	0	–	0	–	3	–	2	.600
† 2027 ACC tournament winner As of November 20, 2026; Rankings from AP poll

The 2026–27 Boston College Eagles men's basketball team will represent Boston College during the 2026–27 NCAA Division I men's basketball season as members of the Atlantic Coast Conference (ACC). The Eagles will be led by first-year head coach Luke Murray and play their home games at the Conte Forum.

== Previous season ==
The Eagles finished the season 13–18 and 4–14 in ACC play to finish in 18th place. Under the ACC tournament rules, they failed to qualify for the ACC tournament. They were not invited to the NCAA tournament or the National Invitation Tournament (NIT).

== Offseason ==
=== Departures ===
Departures
Name	Number	Pos.	Height	Weight	Year	Hometown	Reason for departure
Akbar Waheed III	3	G	6'6"	205	Freshman	North Bethesda, Maryland	Transferred to St. Bonaventure
Jack Di Donna	4	G	6'0"	185	Junior	Boca Raton, Florida	Left team
Fred Payne	5	G	6'2"	185	Redshirt Sophomore	Grambling, Louisiana	Transferred to Oregon
Kany Musungay	8	F	6'9"	200	Sophomore	Kinshasa, DR Congo	Transferred to Longwood
Chase Forte	9	G	6'4"	190	Graduate Student	Raleigh, North Carolina	Graduated
Luka Toews	10	G	6'1"	190	Sophomore	Tokyo, Japan	Transferred to Furman
Nick Petronio	11	G	6'3"	195	Redshirt Freshman	Needham, Massachusetts	Transferred to Delaware
Donald Hand Jr.	13	G	6'5"	210	Redshirt Junior	Virginia Beach, Virginia	Transferred to Loyola Chicago
Jack Eggemeier	21	G	6'2"	190	Sophomore	Menlo Park, California	Left team
Jayden Hastings	22	F	6'9"	240	Redshirt Sophomore	Orlando, Florida	Transferred to Cincinnati
Aidan Shaw	23	G/F	6'9"	210	Senior	Overland Park, Kansas	Transferred to George Washington
Caleb Steger	30	G	6'5"	180	Freshman	Dallas, Texas	Transferred to Texas State
Boden Kapke	33	F/C	6'11"	255	Junior	Victoria, Minnesota	Transferred to Nebraska
Jason Asemota	55	F	6'8"	205	Sophomore	Lynn, Massachusetts	Transferred to UCF
Marko Radunovic	88	G/F	6'6"	205	Freshman	Podgorica, Montenegro	Transferred to Fairfield

=== Incoming transfers ===
Boston College incoming transfers
Name	Number	Pos.	Height	Weight	Year	Hometown	Previous school
Money Williams	0	G	6'4"	206	Senior	Oakland, California	Montana
Andrija Bukumirovic	1	G/F	6'7"	197	Senior	Sjenica, Serbia	UT Martin
Colby Duggan	2	F	6'7"	218	Senior	Monson, Massachusetts	Charleston
Ernest Shelton	3	G	6'5"	175	Senior	Philadelphia, Pennsylvania	Merrimack
Armoni Zeigler	5	G	6'4"	190	Senior	Amityville, New York	Ball State
Jacob Furphy	7	G	6'5"	191	Sophomore	Smithton, Tasmania	UConn
JB Frankel	11	G	6'3"	197	Graduate Student	New York, New York	Northeastern
Jameson O'Toole	12	G	6'3"	194	Senior	Gibsonia, Pennsylvania	Fordham
Aly Tounkara	13	F	7'0"	232	Junior	Conakry, Guinea	Arkansas State
Brandon Benjamin	20	F	6'8"	230	Sophomore	Newark, New Jersey	Fairfield
Luke Hunger	33	F	6'10"	250	Senior	Montreal, Quebec	George Washington

== Roster ==
2026–27 Boston College Eagles men's basketball team
Players
Coaches

Pos.	#	Name	Height	Weight	Year	Previous school	Hometown
G	0	Money Williams	6 ft 4 in (1.93 m)	206 lb (93 kg)	Sr	Oakland High School; Montana	Oakland, CA
G/F	1	Andrija Bukumirovic	6 ft 7 in (2.01 m)	197 lb (89 kg)	Sr	Gimnazija Novi Pazar; UT Martin	Sjenica, Serbia
F	2	Colby Duggan	6 ft 7 in (2.01 m)	218 lb (99 kg)	Sr	Phillips Academy; Charleston	Monson, MA
G	3	Ernest Shelton	6 ft 5 in (1.96 m)	175 lb (79 kg)	RS Sr	Father Judge High School; Merrimack	Philadelphia, PA
G	5	Armoni Zeigler	6 ft 4 in (1.93 m)	190 lb (86 kg)	Sr	Our Saviour Lutheran School; Ball State	Amityville, NY
G	7	Jacob Furphy	6 ft 5 in (1.96 m)	191 lb (87 kg)	So	Lake Ginninderra College; UConn	Smithton, Tasmania
G	11	JB Frankel	6 ft 3 in (1.91 m)	197 lb (89 kg)	GS	Brewster Academy; Northeastern	New York, NY
G	12	Jameson O'Toole	6 ft 3 in (1.91 m)	194 lb (88 kg)	GS	St. Thomas More; Fordham	Gibsonia, PA
F	13	Aly Tounkara	7 ft 0 in (2.13 m)	232 lb (105 kg)	Jr	Principia High School; Arkansas State	Conakry, Guinea
G	14	Jordan Ghee	6 ft 4 in (1.93 m)	209 lb (95 kg)	Fr	The Hotchkiss School	Totowa, NJ
F	20	Brandon Benjamin	6 ft 8 in (2.03 m)	230 lb (104 kg)	So	Link Academy; Fairfield	Newark, NJ
G	21	Will Eggemeier	6 ft 3 in (1.91 m)	190 lb (86 kg)	Sr	Menlo School	Menlo Park, CA
F	22	Jack Bailey	6 ft 10 in (2.08 m)	225 lb (102 kg)	RS Fr	Blair Academy	New York, NY
G/F	24	Žak Smrekar	6 ft 6 in (1.98 m)	204 lb (93 kg)	Fr	KK Krka	Novo Mesto, Slovenia
F	33	Luke Hunger	6 ft 10 in (2.08 m)	250 lb (113 kg)	GS	Northfield Mount Hermon; George Washington	Montreal, QC

Head coach

- Luke Murray (Fairfield)

Assistant coach(es)

- Tim O'Toole (Fairfield)
- Kyle Griffin (Siena)
- Mathew Johnson (Tampa)
- Brenden Straughn (Hood)

Legend

- (C) Team captain
- (S) Suspended
- (I) Ineligible
- (W) Walk-on
- Injured
- Current redshirt

Roster
Last update: October 20, 2026

== Schedule and results ==
Date time, TV	Rank^{#}	Opponent^{#}	Result	Record	High points	High rebounds	High assists	Site (attendance) city, state
Exhibition
October 25, 2026*; 2:00 p.m.		MIT	W 90–46	-	22 – Hunger	5 – Tied	6 – Frankel	Conte Forum; Chestnut Hill, MA
Regular season
November 3, 2026*; 7:00 p.m., ACCNX		Wagner	W 76–50	1–0	22 – Williams	10 – Benjamin	4 – Williams	Conte Forum (3,752); Chestnut Hill, MA
November 6, 2026*; 4:00 p.m., ESPN+		vs. UMass; Hall of Fame Series Boston	W 71–55	2–0	35 – Williams	9 – Williams	5 – Williams	TD Garden (4,734); Boston, MA
November 10, 2026*; 7:00 p.m., ACCNX		Maryland Eastern Shore	W 82–54	3–0	20 – Hunger	9 – Zeigler	4 – Williams	Conte Forum (2,553); Chestnut Hill, MA
November 15, 2026*; 1:30 p.m., ACCNX		New Hampshire	W 67–55	4–0	17 – Shelton	11 – Smrekar	6 – Zeigler	Conte Forum (2,606); Chestnut Hill, MA
November 18, 2026*; 8:00 p.m., NESN/ESPN+		at Harvard	W 74–69	5–0	19 – Benjamin	13 – Benjamin	7 – Zeigler	Lavietes Pavilion (1,636); Cambridge, MA
November 22, 2026*; 5:00 p.m., ACCN		NJIT						Conte Forum; Chestnut Hill, MA
November 26, 2026*; 1:30 p.m., ESPN2		vs. UCF; ESPN Events Invitational						State Farm Field House; Kissimmee, FL
November 27, 2026*; 4:30 p.m., ACCN		vs. Cincinnati; ESPN Events Invitational						State Farm Field House; Kissimmee, FL
December 1, 2026*; 5:00 p.m., ESPN2		at Georgia; ACC–SEC Challenge						Stegeman Coliseum; Athens, GA
December 5, 2026*; 7:00 p.m., ACCN		UMass Lowell						Conte Forum; Chestnut Hill, MA
December 9, 2026*; 9:00 p.m., ACCN		Northeastern						Conte Forum; Chestnut Hill, MA
December 12, 2026*; 12:00 p.m., ACCN		George Washington						Conte Forum; Chestnut Hill, MA
December 20, 2026*; 12:00 p.m., ACCNX		New Haven						Conte Forum; Chestnut Hill, MA
December 22, 2026*; 7:00 p.m., ACCNX		Stonehill						Conte Forum; Chestnut Hill, MA
ACC regular season
January 2, 2027; 4:00 p.m., ESPN/ESPN2		North Carolina						Conte Forum; Chestnut Hill, MA
January 5, 2027; 9:00 p.m., ACCN		Clemson						Conte Forum; Chestnut Hill, MA
January 9, 2027; 8:00 p.m., ACCN		at Virginia Tech						Cassell Coliseum; Blacksburg, VA
January 13, 2027; 8:00 p.m., The CW		at Virginia						John Paul Jones Arena; Charlottesville, VA
January 16, 2027; 7:00 p.m., ACCN		Duke						Conte Forum; Chestnut Hill, MA
January 19, 2027; 7:00 p.m., ACCN		at Syracuse						JMA Wireless Dome; Syracuse, NY
January 23, 2027; 7:00 p.m., ACCN		at Pittsburgh						Petersen Events Center; Pittsburgh, PA
January 27, 2027; 7:00 p.m., ACCN		Louisville						Conte Forum; Chestnut Hill, MA
February 2, 2027; 6:00 p.m., ACCN		at Wake Forest						Lawrence Joel Veterans Memorial Coliseum; Winston-Salem, NC
February 6, 2027; 5:30 p.m., ACCN		Notre Dame						Conte Forum; Chestnut Hill, MA
February 9, 2027; 9:00 p.m., ACCN		Georgia Tech						Conte Forum; Chestnut Hill, MA
February 13, 2027; 1:00 p.m., The CW		at NC State						Lenovo Center; Raleigh, NC
February 16, 2027; 7:00 p.m., ACCN		SMU						Conte Forum; Chestnut Hill, MA
February 20, 2027; 12:00 p.m., ACCN		Virginia Tech						Conte Forum; Chestnut Hill, MA
February 24, 2027; 9:00 p.m., ACCN		at California						Haas Pavilion; Berkeley, CA
February 27, 2027; 8:00/8:30 p.m., ESPN2		at Stanford						Maples Pavilion; Stanford, CA
March 3, 2027; 6:30 p.m., ACCN		Florida State						Conte Forum; Chestnut Hill, MA
March 6, 2027; 2:00 p.m., ACCN		at Notre Dame						Joyce Center; South Bend, IN
*Non-conference game. ^{#}Rankings from AP Poll. (#) Tournament seedings in parentheses. All times are in Eastern Time.
