= 2026–27 North Carolina Tar Heels men's basketball team =

American college basketball season

2026–27 North Carolina Tar Heels men's basketball
- Conference: Atlantic Coast Conference
- Record: 3–1 (0–0 ACC)
- Head coach: Michael Malone (1st season)
- Associate head coach: Chuck Martin (1st season)
- Assistant coaches: Sean May (6th season); Brandon Robinson (1st season); Jorge Sanz (1st season); Pat Sullivan (6th season); Bryan Tibaldi (1st season)
- Home arena: Dean Smith Center

2026–27 ACC men's basketball standings
	Conf.				Overall
Team	W		L	PCT	W		L	PCT
No. 4 Virginia	0	–	0	–	5	–	0	1.000
Boston College	0	–	0	–	4	–	0	1.000
Georgia Tech	0	–	0	–	4	–	0	1.000
NC State	0	–	0	–	4	–	0	1.000
Notre Dame	0	–	0	–	4	–	0	1.000
Pittsburgh	0	–	0	–	4	–	0	1.000
SMU	0	–	0	–	4	–	0	1.000
Virginia Tech	0	–	0	–	3	–	0	1.000
Clemson	0	–	0	–	3	–	1	.750
No. 5 Duke	0	–	0	–	3	–	1	.750
Florida State	0	–	0	–	3	–	1	.750
No. 17 Miami (FL)	0	–	0	–	3	–	1	.750
North Carolina	0	–	0	–	3	–	1	.750
Stanford	0	–	0	–	3	–	1	.750
Wake Forest	0	–	0	–	3	–	1	.750
No. 23 Louisville	0	–	0	–	2	–	1	.667
California	0	–	0	–	3	–	2	.600
Syracuse	0	–	0	–	2	–	2	.500
† 2027 ACC tournament winner As of November 17, 2026; Rankings from AP poll

The 2026–27 North Carolina Tar Heels men's basketball team represents the University of North Carolina at Chapel Hill for the 2026–27 NCAA Division I men's basketball season as members of the Atlantic Coast Conference (ACC). The team is led by coach Michael Malone in his first season as head coach and play their home games at the Dean Smith Center in Chapel Hill, North Carolina.

== Previous season ==
The Tar Heels finished the 2025–26 season 24–9, 12–6 in ACC play to finish in a two-way tie for fourth place. As the No. 4 seed in the ACC Tournament, they would loss to 5th seed Clemson 80-79 in the Quarterfinals. They received an at-large bid in the NCAA Tournament as the 6th seed, and were they would loss to 11th seed VCU 82-78 in Overtime in the First round.

== Roster ==
2026–27 North Carolina Tar Heels men's basketball team
Players
Coaches

Pos.	#	Name	Height	Weight	Year	Previous school	Hometown
G	1	Terrence Brown	6 ft 3 in (1.91 m)	180 lb (82 kg)	Sr	Utah	Minneapolis, Minnesota
G	2	Isaiah Denis	6 ft 4 in (1.93 m)	185 lb (84 kg)	So	Davidson Day School	Charlotte, North Carolina
G	3	Matt Able	6 ft 5 in (1.96 m)	200 lb (91 kg)	So	NC State	Baltimore, Maryland
G	4	Jaydon Young	6 ft 4 in (1.93 m)	200 lb (91 kg)	Sr	Virginia Tech	Goldsboro, North Carolina
G/F	5	Kevin Thomas	6 ft 6 in (1.98 m)	205 lb (93 kg)	Fr	Sagemont Prep	Fort Lauderdale, Florida
G	14	Angelo Brizzi	6 ft 3 in (1.91 m)	200 lb (91 kg)	GS	Buffalo	Warrenton, Virginia
F	15	Jarin Stevenson	6 ft 10 in (2.08 m)	220 lb (100 kg)	Sr	Alabama	Chapel Hill, North Carolina
G	17	Neo Avdalas	6 ft 9 in (2.06 m)	220 lb (100 kg)	So	Virginia Tech	Kalamata, Greece
C	21	Sayon Keita	7 ft 1 in (2.16 m)	205 lb (93 kg)	Fr	FC Barcelona	Bamako, Mali
F	22	Alex Samodurov	6 ft 11 in (2.11 m)	225 lb (102 kg)	Jr	Panathinaikos	Evosmos, Greece
F	25	Maximo Adams	6 ft 7 in (2.01 m)	220 lb (100 kg)	Fr	Sierra Canyon School	Los Angeles, California
G	30	Malloy Smith	6 ft 5 in (1.96 m)	180 lb (82 kg)	Fr	Mater Dei High School	Newport Beach, California
G	32	Evan Smith	6 ft 1 in (1.85 m)	200 lb (91 kg)	Sr	Ardrey Kell High School	Charlotte, North Carolina
C	35	Cade Bennerman	7 ft 0 in (2.13 m)	205 lb (93 kg)	So	Northwestern	Nashville, Tennessee
C	54	Cameron Fens (I)	7 ft 0 in (2.13 m)	255 lb (116 kg)	GS	South Dakota	Dubuque, Iowa
F	99	John Holbrook	6 ft 8 in (2.03 m)	230 lb (104 kg)	Jr	Hickory High School	Hickory, North Carolina

Head coach

- Michael Malone (Loyola (MD))

Assistant coach(es)

- Chuck Martin (Monmouth)
- Sean May (North Carolina)
- Brandon Robinson (North Carolina)
- Jorge Sanz (Florida Atlantic)
- Pat Sullivan (North Carolina)
- Bryan Tibaldi (Michigan State)

Legend

- (C) Team captain
- (S) Suspended
- (I) Ineligible
- (W) Walk-on
- Injured
- Current redshirt

Roster
Last update: October 15, 2026

== Schedule and results ==
Date time, TV	Rank^{#}	Opponent^{#}	Result	Record	High points	High rebounds	High assists	Site (attendance) city, state
Exhibition
October 9, 2026*; 7:00 p.m., ACCN		vs. USC	W 88–70		25 – Stevenson	10 – Stevenson	5 – Avdalas	First Horizon Coliseum (7,892); Greensboro, NC
October 18, 2026*; 5:00 p.m., B1G+		vs. Indiana	L 58–76		12 – Keita	9 – Keita	4 – Brizzi	Gainbridge Fieldhouse (7,462); Indianapolis, IN
October 27, 2026*; 7:30 p.m., ACCNX		Charlotte	W 89–82 ^{OT}		28 – Brown	9 – Avdalas	5 – Avdalas	Dean Smith Center; Chapel Hill, NC
Regular season
November 2, 2026*; 7:00 p.m., ACCN		Western Carolina	W 80–72	1–0	18 – Able	7 – Avdalas	4 – Avdalas	Dean E. Smith Center (15,735); Chapel Hill, NC
November 6, 2026*; 7:00 p.m., ACCN		Wofford	W 109–70	2–0	21 – Brown	11 – Adams	5 – Denis	Dean E. Smith Center (17,032); Chapel Hill, NC
November 10, 2026*; 7:00 p.m., ACCN		Wyoming	W 76–63	3–0	14 – Tied	9 – Adams	4 – Avdalas	Dean E. Smith Center (16,805); Chapel Hill, NC
November 13, 2026*; 7:00 p.m., ESPN2		Georgia	L 70–78	3–1	21 – Brown	11 – Adams	3 – Tied	Dean E. Smith Center (16,041); Chapel Hill, NC
November 20, 2026*; 9:00 p.m., ACCN		Marshall						Dean E. Smith Center; Chapel Hill, NC
November 23, 2026*; 8:00 p.m., ACCN		Monmouth						Dean E. Smith Center; Chapel Hill, NC
November 27, 2026*; 7:00 p.m., ESPN		vs. West Virginia; Dick Vitale Invitational						Spectrum Center; Charlotte, NC
December 1, 2026*; 7:30 p.m., ESPN		Arkansas; ACC–SEC Challenge						Dean E. Smith Center; Chapel Hill, NC
December 6, 2026*; 3:00 p.m., ESPN2		Butler						Dean E. Smith Center; Chapel Hill, NC
December 12, 2026*; 12:00 p.m., NBCSN/Peacock		at Georgetown						Capital One Arena; Washington, D.C.
December 15, 2026; 7:00 p.m., ESPN2		vs. NC State; Tobacco Road Classic						First Horizon Coliseum; Greensboro, NC
December 19, 2026*; 2:30 p.m., CBS		vs. Kentucky; CBS Sports Classic						Madison Square Garden; New York, NY
December 21, 2026*; 8:00 p.m., The CW		The Citadel						Dean E. Smith Center; Chapel Hill, NC
December 30, 2026; 4:00 p.m., ESPN2		California						Dean E. Smith Center; Chapel Hill, NC
January 2, 2027; 4:00 p.m., ESPN/ESPN2		at Boston College						Conte Forum; Chapel Hill, NC
January 5, 2027; 9:00 p.m., ESPN/ESPNU		at Louisville						KFC Yum! Center; Louisville, KY
January 9, 2027; 12:00 p.m., ESPN2		NC State						Dean E. Smith Center; Chapel Hill, NC
January 13, 2027; 7:00 p.m., ESPN2/ESPNU		at Florida State						Donald L. Tucker Civic Center; Tallahassee, FL
January 16, 2027; 2:15 p.m., The CW		Stanford						Dean E. Smith Center; Chapel Hill, NC
January 19, 2027; 9:00 p.m., ESPN		Virginia						Dean E. Smith Center; Chapel Hill, NC
January 23, 2027; 12:00 p.m., ESPN/ESPN2/ESPNU		at Syracuse						JMA Wireless Dome; Syracuse, NY
January 26, 2027; 7:00 p.m., ESPN/ESPN2		SMU						Dean E. Smith Center; Chapel Hill, NC
January 30, 2027*; 6:00/6:30 p.m., ESPN		vs. Illinois; Nashville Hoops Showdown						Bridgestone Arena; Nashville, TN
February 2, 2027; 7:00 p.m., ESPN/ESPN2/ESPNU		at Notre Dame						Joyce Center; South Bend, IN
February 6, 2027; 2:15 p.m., The CW		Georgia Tech						Dean E. Smith Center; Chapel Hill, NC
February 8, 2027; 6:00 p.m., ESPN		Louisville						Dean E. Smith Center; Chapel Hill, NC
February 13, 2027; 5:30 p.m., ABC		at Duke; Rivalry						Cameron Indoor Stadium; Durham, NC
February 20, 2027; 7:00 p.m., ACCN		at Wake Forest						Lawrence Joel Veterans Memorial Coliseum; Winston-Salem, NC
February 22, 2027; 7:00 p.m., ESPN		Miami						Dean E. Smith Center; Chapel Hill, NC
February 27, 2027; 7:00 p.m., ACCN		at Virginia Tech						Cassell Coliseum; Blacksburg, VA
March 2, 2027; 9:00 p.m., ESPN/ESPN2		at Pittsburgh						Petersen Events Center; Pittsburgh, PA
March 6, 2027; 6:00/6:30 p.m., ESPN		Duke; Rivalry						Dean E. Smith Center; Chapel Hill, NC
ACC tournament
March 9–13, 2027		vs.						First Horizon Coliseum; Greensboro, NC
*Non-conference game. ^{#}Rankings from AP poll. (#) Tournament seedings in parentheses. All times are in Eastern Time.

== Rankings ==
Ranking movements Legend: ██ Increase in ranking ██ Decrease in ranking — = Not ranked RV = Received votes
	Week																				
Poll	Pre	1	2	3	4	5	6	7	8	9	10	11	12	13	14	15	16	17	18	19	Final
AP	RV	RV	RV																		
Coaches	RV	RV	—																		
