= B. J. Edwards =

English photographer (1838–1914)

Benjamin Joseph Edwards (1838–1914) was a pioneer in photography. Edwards worked on the construction and design of instantaneous shutters and originated the method of intensifying plates with mercuric iodide. He was the first, in 1887, to make orthochromatic plates in Britain.

Edwards lived at Wistowe House in Hayes, Middlesex, which also housed the small factory where for a time he manufactured a special type of printing paper marketed as "Wisto". Edwards died just before the First World War in 1914. A photograph of Edwards may be found in the 1926 edition of the British Journal Photographic Almanac.

B. J. Edwards became a limited company in 1900. In the 1906 edition of the British Journal Photographic Almanac, their advertisement states that Edwards himself once more had sole control of the company. The company was acquired by Leto Photo materials Co. (1905) Ltd. in 1909. The Ealing works remained and Edwards became a brand name.
