= Notre Dame Fighting Irish men's basketball statistical leaders =

The Notre Dame Fighting Irish men's basketball statistical leaders are individual statistical leaders of the Notre Dame Fighting Irish men's basketball program in various categories, including points, three-pointers, assists, blocks, rebounds, and steals. Within those areas, the lists identify single-game, single-season, and career leaders. The Fighting Irish represent the University of Notre Dame in the NCAA's Atlantic Coast Conference.

Notre Dame began competing in intercollegiate basketball in 1897. However, the school's record book does not generally list records from before the 1950s, as records from before this period are often incomplete and inconsistent. Since scoring was much lower in this era, and teams played much fewer games during a typical season, it is likely that few or no players from this era would appear on these lists anyway.

The NCAA did not officially record assists as a stat until the 1983–84 season, and blocks and steals until the 1985–86 season, but Notre Dame's record books includes players in these stats before these seasons. These lists are updated through the end of the 2020–21 season.

== Scoring ==
Career
Rk	Player	Points	Seasons
1	Austin Carr	2,560	1968–69 1969–70 1970–71
2	Luke Harangody	2,476	2006–07 2007–08 2008–09 2009–10
3	Adrian Dantley	2,223	1973–74 1974–75 1975–76
4	Chris Thomas	2,195	2001–02 2002–03 2003–04 2004–05
5	Pat Garrity	2,085	1994–95 1995–96 1996–97 1997–98
6	David Rivers	2,058	1984–85 1985–86 1986–87 1987–88
7	Troy Murphy	2,011	1998–99 1999–00 2000–01
8	Matt Carroll	1,850	1999–00 2000–01 2001–02 2002–03
9	Tom Hawkins	1,820	1956–57 1957–58 1958–59
10	David Graves	1,746	1998–99 1999–00 2000–01 2001–02

Season
Rk	Player	Points	Season
1	Austin Carr	1,106	1969–70
2	Austin Carr	1,101	1970–71
3	Adrian Dantley	883	1974–75
4	Troy Murphy	839	1999–00
5	Adrian Dantley	829	1975–76
6	Luke Harangody	792	2008–09
7	Tom Hawkins	730	1957–58
8	John Shumate	703	1973–74
9	Luke Harangody	672	2007–08
10	Collis Jones	671	1970–71

Single game
Rk	Player	Points	Season	Opponent
1	Austin Carr	61	1969–70	Ohio
2	Austin Carr	55	1969–70	West Virginia
3	Austin Carr	54	1970–71	Indiana
4	Austin Carr	53	1969–70	Tulane
5	Austin Carr	52	1969–70	Kentucky
	Austin Carr	52	1970–71	TCU
7	Austin Carr	51	1969–70	DePaul
8	Austin Carr	50	1969–70	Butler
	Austin Carr	50	1970–71	Kentucky
10	Adrian Dantley	49	1974–75	Air Force

== Rebounds ==
Career
Rk	Player	Rebounds	Seasons
1	Tom Hawkins	1,318	1956–57 1957–58 1958–59
2	Luke Harangody	1,222	2006–07 2007–08 2008–09 2009–10
3	Walter Sahm	1,146	1962–63 1963–64 1964–65
4	LaPhonso Ellis	1,075	1988–89 1989–90 1990–91 1991–92
5	Robert Whitmore	1,043	1966–67 1967–68 1968–69
6	Bob Arnzen	944	1966–67 1967–68 1968–69
7	Troy Murphy	924	1998–99 1999–00 2000–01
	John Mooney	924	2016–17 2017–18 2018–19 2019–20
9	Nate Laszewski	918	2018–19 2019–20 2020–21 2021–22 2022–23
10	Bonzie Colson	900	2014–15 2015–16 2016–17 2017–18

Season
Rk	Player	Rebounds	Season
1	Tom Hawkins	499	1957–58
2	Tom Hawkins	484	1956–57
3	Walter Sahm	438	1962–63
4	John Smyth	423	1956–57
5	Robert Whitmore	414	1967–68
6	Luke Harangody	401	2008–09
7	John Mooney	394	2019–20
8	Walter Sahm	393	1964–65
9	Zach Auguste	386	2015–16
10	LaPhonso Ellis	385	1991–92

Single game
Rk	Player	Rebounds	Season	Opponent
1	Robert Whitmore	30	1967–68	St. Norbert's
2	Collis Jones	25	1970–71	Western Michigan
3	LaPhonso Ellis	24	1989–90	Creighton
	Collis Jones	24	1969–70	St. Peter's
	Robert Whitmore	24	1966–67	Detroit Mercy
6	Collis Jones	23	1970–71	Butler
	Bob Arnzen	23	1966–67	King's College
8	Zach Auguste	22	2015–16	Duke
	Luke Harangody	22	2007–08	Washington State
	Collis Jones	22	1970–71	Houston
	Robert Whitmore	22	1966–67	NYU
	Bob Arnzen	22	1966–67	Illinois

== Assists ==
Career
Rk	Player	Assists	Seasons
1	Chris Thomas	833	2001–02 2002–03 2003–04 2004–05
2	Tory Jackson	694	2006–07 2007–08 2008–09 2009–10
3	Jerian Grant	690	2011–12 2012–13 2013–14 2014–15
4	Eric Atkins	589	2010–11 2011–12 2012–13 2013–14
5	David Rivers	586	1984–85 1985–86 1986–87 1987–88
6	Prentiss Hubb	585	2018–19 2019–20 2020–21 2021–22
7	Tim Singleton	549	1987–88 1988–89 1989–90 1990–91
8	Martin Ingelsby	526	1997–98 1998–99 1999–00 2000–01
9	Elmer Bennett	516	1988–89 1989–90 1990–91 1991–92
10	Rich Branning	466	1976–77 1977–78 1978–79 1979–80

Season
Rk	Player	Assists	Season
1	Jerian Grant	253	2014–15
2	Chris Thomas	252	2001–02
3	Chris Thomas	236	2002–03
4	Jackie Meehan	214	1970–71
	Jimmy Dillon	214	1999–00
6	Tim Singleton	208	1988–89
7	Elmer Bennett	204	1991–92
8	Admore White	201	1996–97
9	Matt Farrell	196	2016–17
10	Chris Thomas	195	2004–05

Single game
Rk	Player	Assists	Season	Opponent
1	Jackie Meehan	17	1970–71	Creighton
2	Tory Jackson	15	2009–10	Syracuse
3	Tim Singleton	14	1988–89	Dayton
4	Eric Atkins	13	2012–13	Kennesaw State
	Chris Thomas	13	2002–03	Virginia Tech
	Chris Thomas	13	2002–03	Canisius
	Chris Thomas	13	2002–03	Hawaii Pacific
	Martin Ingelsby	13	2000–01	Rutgers
	Admore White	13	1996–97	Michigan
	Ryan Hoover	13	1993–94	Louisville
	Elmer Bennett	13	1991–92	Manhattan

== Steals ==
Career
Rk	Player	Steals	Seasons
1	Chris Thomas	244	2001–02 2002–03 2003–04 2004–05
2	Tory Jackson	211	2006–07 2007–08 2008–09 2009–10
3	David Graves	202	1998–99 1999–00 2000–01 2001–02
4	David Rivers	201	1984–85 1985–86 1986–87 1987–88
5	Jerian Grant	175	2011–12 2012–13 2013–14 2014–15
6	Chris Quinn	155	2002–03 2003–04 2004–05 2005–06
7	Elmer Bennett	152	1988–89 1989–90 1990–91 1991–92
8	Eric Atkins	151	2010–11 2011–12 2012–13 2013–14
9	Rex Pflueger	146	2015–16 2016–17 2017–18 2018–19 2019–20
10	Ryan Hoover	145	1992–93 1993–94 1994–95 1995–96

Season
Rk	Player	Steals	Season
1	Chris Thomas	72	2001–02
2	Jimmy Dillon	66	1999–00
3	Jerian Grant	63	2014–15
	Markus Burton	63	2023–24
5	Chris Thomas	62	2002–03
6	David Rivers	61	1984–85
7	Elmer Bennett	60	1991–92
	David Graves	60	1999–00
	Chris Thomas	60	2004–05
10	Tory Jackson	59	2006–07
	Demetrius Jackson	59	2014–15

Single game
Rk	Player	Steals	Season	Opponent
1	Chris Thomas	11	2001–02	New Hampshire
2	Donald Royal	7	1984–85	St. Joseph's (IN)
3	Markus Burton	6	2023–24	Virginia Tech
	Jerian Grant	6	2013–14	Army
	Eric Atkins	6	2012–13	St. John's
	Russell Carter	6	2005–06	IPFW
	Chris Quinn	6	2004–05	Harvard
	Chris Quinn	6	2003–04	Northern Illinois
	Joe Fredrick	6	1987–88	UCLA
	Admore White	6	1996–97	Syracuse

== Blocks ==
Career
Rk	Player	Blocks	Seasons
1	Jordan Cornette	201	2001–02 2002–03 2003–04 2004–05
2	LaPhonso Ellis	200	1988–89 1989–90 1990–91 1991–92
3	Juwan Durham	178	2018–19 2019–20 2020–21
4	Ryan Humphrey	166	2000–01 2001–02
5	Torin Francis	157	2002–03 2003–04 2004–05 2005–06
6	Bonzie Colson	155	2014–15 2015–16 2016–17 2017–18
7	Troy Murphy	126	1998–99 1999–00 2000–01
8	Rob Kurz	122	2004–05 2005–06 2006–07 2007–08
9	Jack Cooley	116	2009–10 2010–11 2011–12 2012–13
10	Matt Gotsch	97	1993–94 1994–95 1995–96 1996–97
	Carleton Scott	97	2008–09 2009–10 2010–11

Season
Rk	Player	Blocks	Season
1	Ryan Humphrey	87	2001–02
2	LaPhonso Ellis	86	1991–92
3	Ryan Humphrey	79	2000–01
4	Jordan Cornette	75	2002–03
5	Juwan Durham	66	2019–20
6	Jordan Cornette	63	2003–04
	Juwan Durham	63	2018–19
8	Torin Francis	60	2002–03
9	Tracy Jackson	59	1980–81
10	Carleton Scott	57	2010–11

Single game
Rk	Player	Blocks	Season	Opponent
1	Jordan Cornette	11	2002–03	Belmont
2	Jordan Cornette	8	2002–03	IUPUI
	Torin Francis	8	2002–03	Texas
	Jordan Cornette	8	2001–02	Rutgers
	LaPhonso Ellis	8	1991–92	Kansas State
6	Ryan Humphrey	7	2000–01	Seton Hall
	LaPhonso Ellis	7	1991–92	Dayton
8	Juwan Durham	6	2018–19	Coppin State
	Juwan Durham	6	2018–19	UIC
	Jack Cooley	6	2012–13	Evansville
	Jordan Cornette	6	2004–05	West Virginia
	Ryan Humphrey	6	2001–02	Duke
	Ryan Humphrey	6	2001–02	St. John's
	Ryan Humphrey	6	2001–02	Miami (OH)
	Ryan Humphrey	6	2001–02	Indiana
	Ryan Humphrey	6	2000–01	Boston College
	Ryan Humphrey	6	2000–01	Vanderbilt
	Ryan Humphrey	6	2000–01	Cincinnati
	LaPhonso Ellis	6	1991–92	Butler
