= 2012–13 Notre Dame Fighting Irish men's basketball team =

American college basketball season

2012–13 Notre Dame Fighting Irish men's basketball

NCAA Tournament, round of 64
- Conference: Big East Conference (1979–2013)

Ranking
- AP: No. 25
- Record: 25–10 (11–7 Big East)
- Head coach: Mike Brey
- Assistant coaches: Anthony Solomon; Rod Balanis; Martin Ingelsby
- Captains: Eric Atkins; Jack Cooley; Scott Martin
- Home arena: Purcell Pavilion at the Joyce Center

2012–13 Big East men's basketball standings
	Conf.				Overall
Team	W		L	PCT	W		L	PCT
No. 2 Louisville†**	14	–	4	.778	35	–	5	.875
No. 8 Georgetown	14	–	4	.778	25	–	7	.781
No. 15 Marquette	14	–	4	.778	26	–	9	.743
No. 20 Pittsburgh	12	–	6	.667	24	–	9	.727
No. 16 Syracuse	11	–	7	.611	30	–	10	.750
No. 23 Notre Dame	11	–	7	.611	25	–	10	.714
Villanova	10	–	8	.556	20	–	14	.588
Connecticut*	10	–	8	.556	20	–	10	.667
Cincinnati	9	–	9	.500	22	–	12	.647
Providence	9	–	9	.500	19	–	15	.559
St. John's	8	–	10	.444	17	–	16	.515
Rutgers	5	–	13	.278	15	–	16	.484
Seton Hall	3	–	15	.167	15	–	18	.455
South Florida	3	–	15	.167	12	–	19	.387
DePaul	2	–	16	.111	11	–	21	.344
† 2013 Big East tournament winner As of March 30, 2013; Rankings from AP Poll; *Ineligible for postseason play due to APR penalties.

The 2012–13 Notre Dame Fighting Irish men's basketball team represented the University of Notre Dame in the sport of basketball during the 2012–13 college basketball season. The Fighting Irish competed in Division I of the National Collegiate Athletic Association (NCAA) and the Big East Conference. They were led by head coach Mike Brey, and played their home games at the Edmund P. Joyce Center Notre Dame, Indiana.

== Previous season ==
The Fighting Irish finished the 2011–12 season 22–12, 13–5 in Big East play, finishing third place behind Champion Syracuse. There were several Irish to receive All-Big East honors. Junior Jack Cooley was named the Big East's Most Improved as well as was named 2nd Team All-Big East.

The Irish were defeated in the semifinals of the Big East tournament by Louisville. They earned a #7 seed for the NCAA tournament, where they were eliminated in the second round by Xavier.

== Pre-season ==
Following the end of the 2011–12 season, both Tim Abromaitis and Scott Martin applied to the NCAA for a sixth year of eligibility. Abromaitis had been a redshirt during the 2008–09 season, but suffered a torn ACL on November 25, 2011, during practice. He played in just two games during the season, having sat out the first four due to a misunderstanding of the rules during his redshirt season (he had played in exhibition games before the official start of the 2008–09 season).

Martin had transferred to Notre Dame after his freshman season at Purdue and sat out the 2008–2009 season due to NCAA transfer rules, but then suffered a torn ACL during a preseason practice in October 2009, causing him to miss a second full season. His petition for a sixth year was successful, but Abromaitis' was denied.

In June 2012, Notre Dame officially announced a 10-year contract extension for head coach Mike Brey, the third-winningest coach in school history and, with the retirement of Connecticut's Jim Calhoun, now the second-longest tenured coach in the Big East after Jim Boeheim.

Notre Dame recruited three players from the high school senior class of 2011–12, each of whom signed letters-of-intent in November 2011. The recruiting class was rated 16th in the nation by Rivals.com:

College recruiting
Name	Hometown	School	Height	Weight	Commit date
Zach Auguste; PF	Marlborough, MA	New Hampton School	6 ft 9 in (2.06 m)	205 lb (93 kg)	Sep 23, 2011
Zach Auguste; PF	Recruit ratings: Scout: Rivals: (90)				
Cameron Biedscheid; SF	St. Louis, MO	Cardinal Ritter	6 ft 6 in (1.98 m)	175 lb (79 kg)	Sep 23, 2010
Cameron Biedscheid; SF	Recruit ratings: Scout: Rivals: (93)				
Austin Burgett; PF	Avon, IN	Avon HS	6 ft 8 in (2.03 m)	200 lb (91 kg)	Sep 11, 2010
Austin Burgett; PF	Recruit ratings: Scout: Rivals: (89)				
Overall recruit ranking: Scout: NR Rivals: 16
Note: In many cases, Scout, Rivals, 247Sports, On3, and ESPN may conflict in their listings of height and weight.; In these cases, the average was taken. ESPN grades are on a 100-point scale.; Sources: "Notre Dame 2012 Basketball Commitments". Rivals.; "2012 Notre Dame Commits". Scout.; "2012 Player Commitments – Notre Dame". ESPN.; "Scout.com Team Recruiting Rankings". Scout.; "2012 Team Ranking". Rivals.

== Roster ==
2012–13 Notre Dame Fighting Irish men's basketball team
Players
Coaches

Pos.	#	Name	Height	Weight	Year	Previous school	Hometown
G	0	Eric Atkins (C)	6 ft 2 in (1.88 m)	182 lb (83 kg)	Jr	Mount Saint Joseph	Columbia, Maryland
F	1	Cameron Biedscheid	6 ft 7 in (2.01 m)	186 lb (84 kg)	Fr	Cardinal Ritter	St. Louis, Missouri
F	2	Zach Auguste	6 ft 10 in (2.08 m)	230 lb (104 kg)	Fr	New Hampton	Marlborough, Massachusetts
G	4	Patrick Crowley	6 ft 3 in (1.91 m)	195 lb (88 kg)	Jr	St. Francis	Los Gatos, California
C	11	Garrick Sherman	6 ft 10 in (2.08 m)	246 lb (112 kg)	Sr	Kenton / Michigan State	Kenton, Ohio
F	14	Scott Martin (C)	6 ft 8 in (2.03 m)	222 lb (101 kg)	GS	Valparaiso / Purdue	Valparaiso, Indiana
F	15	Eric Katenda	6 ft 9 in (2.06 m)	222 lb (101 kg)	Fr	Sunrise Academy (KS)	Paris, France
F	20	Austin Burgett	6 ft 9 in (2.06 m)	214 lb (97 kg)	Fr	Avon	Avon, Indiana
G	22	Jerian Grant	6 ft 5 in (1.96 m)	195 lb (88 kg)	Jr	DeMatha	Bowie, Maryland
G/F	24	Pat Connaughton	6 ft 5 in (1.96 m)	206 lb (93 kg)	So	St. John's Prep	Arlington, Massachusetts
F	25	Tom Knight	6 ft 9 in (2.06 m)	250 lb (113 kg)	Sr	Dirigo	Dixfield, Maine
G	32	Joey Brooks (redshirt)	6 ft 5 in (1.96 m)	220 lb (100 kg)	Sr	Strake Jesuit College Prep	Houston, Texas
F	33	Mike Broghammer	6 ft 9 in (2.06 m)	265 lb (120 kg)	Sr	Hopkins	Orono, Minnesota
F	45	Jack Cooley (C)	6 ft 9 in (2.06 m)	248 lb (112 kg)	Sr	Glenbrook South	Glenview, Illinois

Head coach

- Mike Brey

Assistant coach(es)

- Anthony Solomon
- Rod Balanis
- Martin Ingelsby

Legend

- (C) Team captain
- (S) Suspended
- (I) Ineligible
- (W) Walk-on
- Injured
- Current redshirt

Roster
Last update: 2012-10-16

- Brooks will redshirt in order to preserve a year of eligibility, which will be spent at another school after he graduates from Notre Dame.
- Katenda, as he arrived at Notre Dame at the beginning of the 2012 Spring Semester, will not be eligible to play until the end of the 2012 Fall Semester.

== Schedule and results ==
Date time, TV	Rank^{#}	Opponent^{#}	Result	Record	Site (attendance) city, state
Exhibition
October 29, 2012*; 7:00 pm		Quincy	W 111–52	–	Purcell Pavilion (7,017); South Bend, IN
November 2, 2012*; 9:00 pm		Cardinal Stritch	W 70–56	–	Purcell Pavilion (8,162); South Bend, IN
Non-conference regular season
November 10, 2012*; 2:00 pm, ESPN3	No. 20	Evansville	W 58–49	1–0	Purcell Pavilion (8,224); South Bend, IN
November 12, 2012*; 7:00 pm, ESPN3	No. 20	Monmouth	W 84–57	2–0	Purcell Pavilion (7,427); South Bend, IN
November 16, 2012*; 9:00 pm, TruTV	No. 20	vs. Saint Joseph's; Coaches Vs. Cancer Classic	L 70–79 ^{OT}	2–1	Barclays Center (6,433); Brooklyn, NY
November 17, 2012*; 7:00 pm, TruTV	No. 20	vs. BYU; Coaches Vs. Cancer Classic	W 78–68	3–1	Barclays Center (5,502); Brooklyn, NY
November 21, 2012*; 7:00 pm, ESPN3		George Washington	W 65–48	4–1	Purcell Pavilion (8,133); South Bend, IN
November 24, 2012*; 1:00 pm, ESPN3		Saint Francis (PA)	W 69–52	5–1	Purcell Pavilion (6,174); South Bend, IN
November 26, 2012*; 7:00 pm, ESPNU		Chicago State	W 92–65	6–1	Purcell Pavilion (7,523); South Bend, IN
November 29, 2012*; 7:00 pm, ESPN2		No. 8 Kentucky; SEC–Big East Challenge	W 64–50	7–1	Purcell Pavilion (9,149); South Bend, IN
December 8, 2012*; 7:00 pm, ESPN3	No. 22	Brown	W 84–57	8–1	Purcell Pavilion (8,360); South Bend, IN
December 15, 2012*; 5:05 pm, ESPN2	No. 22	vs. Purdue; Close the Gap Crossroads Classic	W 81–68	9–1	Bankers Life Fieldhouse (19,192); Indianapolis, IN
December 17, 2012*; 7:00 pm, ESPNU	No. 22	IPFW	W 74–62	10–1	Purcell Pavilion (6,755); South Bend, IN
December 19, 2012*; 7:00 pm, ESPN3	No. 22	Kennesaw State	W 85–57	11–1	Purcell Pavilion (6,772); South Bend, IN
December 21, 2012*; 7:00 pm, ESPNU	No. 22	Niagara	W 89–67	12–1	Purcell Pavilion (8,043); South Bend, IN
Big East Regular Season
January 5, 2013; 12:00 pm, Big East Network/ESPN3	No. 21	Seton Hall	W 93–74	13–1 (1–0)	Purcell Pavilion (8,523); South Bend, IN
January 7, 2013; 6:30 pm, ESPN2	No. 17	at No. 21 Cincinnati	W 66–60	14–1 (2–0)	Fifth Third Arena (10,293); Cincinnati, OH
January 12, 2013; 2:00 pm, Big East Network/ESPN3	No. 17	Connecticut	L 58–65	14–2 (2–1)	Purcell Pavilion (9,149); South Bend, IN
January 15, 2013; 7:00 pm, ESPN2	No. 20	at St. John's	L 63–67	14–3 (2–2)	Madison Square Garden (7,434); New York, NY
January 19, 2013; 8:00 pm, Big East Network/ESPN3	No. 20	Rutgers	W 69–66	15–3 (3–2)	Purcell Pavilion (9,149); South Bend, IN
January 21, 2013; 7:30 pm, ESPN	No. 24	Georgetown	L 47–63	15–4 (3–3)	Purcell Pavilion (9,149); South Bend, IN
January 26, 2013; 12:00 pm, Big East Network/ESPN3	No. 24	at South Florida	W 73–65	16–4 (4–3)	USF Sun Dome (6,373); Tampa, FL
January 30, 2013; 6:00 pm, ESPN2		Villanova	W 65–60	17–4 (5–3)	Purcell Pavilion (8,075); South Bend, IN
February 2, 2013; 2:00 pm, ESPN2		at DePaul	W 79–71 ^{OT}	18–4 (6–3)	Allstate Arena (11,354); Chicago, IL
February 4, 2013; 7:00 pm, ESPN	No. 25	at No. 9 Syracuse	L 47–63	18–5 (6–4)	Carrier Dome (23,982); Syracuse, NY
February 9, 2013; 9:00 pm, ESPN	No. 25	No. 11 Louisville; ESPN College GameDay	W 104–101 ^{5OT}	19–5 (7–4)	Purcell Pavilion (9,149); South Bend, IN
February 13, 2013; 7:00 pm, Big East Network/ESPN3	No. 21	DePaul	W 82–78 ^{OT}	20–5 (8–4)	Purcell Pavilion (8,554); South Bend, IN
February 16, 2013; 12:00 pm, Big East Network/ESPN3	No. 21	at Providence	L 54–71	20–6 (8–5)	Dunkin' Donuts Center (12,428); Providence, RI
February 18, 2013; 7:00 pm, ESPN	No. 25	at No. 20 Pittsburgh	W 51–42	21–6 (9–5)	Petersen Events Center (12,556); Pittsburgh, PA
February 24, 2013; 2:00 pm, CBS	No. 25	Cincinnati	W 62–41	22–6 (10–5)	Purcell Pavilion (9,149); South Bend, IN
March 2, 2013; 2:00 pm, ESPN	No. 21	at No. 22 Marquette	L 64–72	22–7 (10–6)	Bradley Center (19,093); Milwaukee, WI
March 5, 2013; 7:00 pm, ESPN2	No. 24	St. John's	W 66–40	23–7 (11–6)	Purcell Pavilion (9,149); South Bend, IN
March 9, 2013; 4:00 pm, CBS	No. 24	at No. 8 Louisville	L 57–73	23–8 (11–7)	KFC Yum! Center (22,815); Louisville, KY
2013 Big East tournament
March 13, 2013; 9:45 pm, ESPN2	(6) No. 24	vs. (11) Rutgers; Second Round	W 69–61	24–8	Madison Square Garden (20,057); New York, NY
March 14, 2013; 9:43 pm, ESPN	(6) No. 24	vs. (3) No. 12 Marquette; Quarterfinals	W 73–65	25–8	Madison Square Garden (20,057); New York, NY
March 15, 2013; 9:50 pm, ESPN	(6) No. 24	vs. (2) No. 4 Louisville; Semifinals	L 57–69	25–9	Madison Square Garden; New York, NY
2013 NCAA men's basketball tournament
March 22, 2013; 9:59 pm, CBS	(7 W) No. 23	vs. (10 W) Iowa State; Second Round	L 58–76	25–10	University of Dayton Arena (12,495); Dayton, OH
*Non-conference game. ^{#}Rankings from AP Poll. (#) Tournament seedings in parentheses. All times are in Eastern Time (#) during NCAA Tournament is seed with Region.

== Rankings ==
Ranking movement Legend: ██ Increase in ranking. ██ Decrease in ranking. ██ Not ranked the previous week.
Poll	Pre season	Week 1	Week 2	Week 3	Week 4	Week 5	Week 6	Week 7	Week 8	Week 9	Week 10	Week 11	Week 12	Week 13	Week 14	Week 15	Week 16	Week 17	Week 18	Final
AP	22	20	(RV)	(RV)	22	22	22	21	21	17	20	24	(RV)	25	21	25	21			
Coaches	23	21	(RV)	(RV)	25	24	22	20	19	16	20	23	(RV)	(RV)	21	25	20			
