= 2011–12 Notre Dame Fighting Irish men's basketball team =

American college basketball season

2011–12 Notre Dame Fighting Irish men's basketball

NCAA Tournament, Round of 64
- Conference: Big East Conference (1979–2013)
- Record: 22–12 (13–5 Big East)
- Head coach: Mike Brey
- Assistant coaches: Anthony Solomon; Rod Balanis; Martin Ingelsby
- Home arena: Purcell Pavilion at the Joyce Center

2011–12 Big East men's basketball standings
	Conf.				Overall
Team	W		L	PCT	W		L	PCT
No. 11 Marquette	14	–	4	.778	27	–	8	.771
Notre Dame	13	–	5	.722	22	–	12	.647
Cincinnati	12	–	6	.667	26	–	11	.703
No. 15 Georgetown	12	–	6	.667	24	–	9	.727
South Florida	12	–	6	.667	22	–	14	.611
West Virginia	9	–	9	.500	19	–	14	.576
Connecticut	8	–	10	.444	20	–	14	.588
Seton Hall	8	–	10	.444	21	–	13	.618
Rutgers	6	–	12	.333	14	–	18	.438
St. John's	6	–	12	.333	13	–	19	.406
Pittsburgh	5	–	13	.278	22	–	17	.564
Villanova	5	–	13	.278	13	–	19	.406
Providence	4	–	14	.222	15	–	17	.469
DePaul	3	–	15	.167	12	–	19	.387
*No. 2 Syracuse	0	–	1	.000	0	–	3	.000
**No. 17 Louisville†	0	–	8	.000	0	–	10	.000
† 2012 Big East tournament winner As of March 31, 2012; *Syracuse: 30 reg. season games, 4 postseason games vacated due to sanctions against the program; Disputed record: Syracuse–(34–3)(17–1) **Louisville: 25 reg. season games, 5 postseason games vacated due to sanctions against the program; Disputed record: Louisville–(30-10)(10-8); Rankings from AP Poll

The 2011–12 Notre Dame Fighting Irish men's basketball team represented the University of Notre Dame in the sport of basketball during the 2011–12 college basketball season. The Fighting Irish compete in Division I of the National Collegiate Athletic Association (NCAA) and the Big East Conference. They were led by head coach Mike Brey, and played their home games at the Edmund P. Joyce Center Notre Dame, Indiana.

== Previous season ==
The Fighting Irish finished the 2010–11 season 27–7, 14–4 in Big East play, finishing second place behind Pittsburgh. Ben Hansbrough was named Big East Player of the Year, and Mike Brey was named Big East Coach of the Year for the third time. Brey was also named National Coach of the Year by Sports Illustrated & CBSSports.com, and the recipient of the Associated Press College Basketball Coach of the Year award.

The Irish were defeated in the semifinals of the Big East tournament by Louisville. They earned a #2 seed for the NCAA tournament, the program's highest seeding since 1981, where they were eliminated in the third round by Florida State.

== Preseason ==
=== Roster changes and recruiting ===
Notre Dame lost team captains Hansbrough & Tyrone Nash to graduation. Additionally, forward Carleton Scott surprised many by declaring for the NBA draft, forgoing his final season of eligibility. All three players went undrafted and signed contracts to play in Europe. Notre Dame welcomed one transfer in center Garrick Sherman from Michigan State, who will have two years of eligibility remaining after sitting out the 2011–12 season.

Notre Dame recruited two players from the high school senior class of 2010–11:

College recruiting
Name	Hometown	School	Height	Weight	Commit date
Pat Connaughton; SF	Arlington, MA	St. John's Prep	6 ft 5 in (1.96 m)	190 lb (86 kg)	Sep 19, 2010
Pat Connaughton; SF	Recruit ratings: Scout: Rivals: (92)				
Eric Katenda; PF	Wichita, KS	Sunrise Christian Academy	6 ft 8 in (2.03 m)	210 lb (95 kg)	Apr 26, 2011
Eric Katenda; PF	Recruit ratings: Scout: Rivals: (91)				
Overall recruit ranking: Scout: NR Rivals: NR
Note: In many cases, Scout, Rivals, 247Sports, On3, and ESPN may conflict in their listings of height and weight.; In these cases, the average was taken. ESPN grades are on a 100-point scale.; Sources: "Notre Dame 2011 Basketball Commitments". Rivals.; "2011 Notre Dame Commits". Scout.; "2011 Player Commitments – Notre Dame". ESPN.; "Scout.com Team Recruiting Rankings". Scout.; "2011 Team Ranking". Rivals.

Both Katenda and Connaughton were expected to contribute in their freshman season. However, Katenda suffered a "freak injury" to his left eye during a summer pick-up game, leaving him with a permanently damaged optic nerve. The injury, combined with an academic issue with the NCAA, delayed his enrollment at Notre Dame until January 2012. He will sit out the remainder of the season but is expected to play again.

== Awards and honors ==
- 2nd Team All-Big East – Jack Cooley
- Big East Most Improved Player – Jack Cooley
- Big East All-Rookie Team – Jerian Grant
- Jim Phelan Coach of the Year Award – Mike Brey
- NABC District V Coach of the Year – Mike Brey

== Roster ==
2011–12 Notre Dame Fighting Irish men's basketball team
Players
Coaches

Pos.	#	Name	Height	Weight	Year	Previous school	Hometown
G	0	Eric Atkins (C)	6 ft 1 in (1.85 m)	182 lb (83 kg)	So	Mount Saint Joseph	Columbia, Maryland
G	4	Patrick Crowley	6 ft 3 in (1.91 m)	190 lb (86 kg)	So	St. Francis	Los Gatos, California
C	11	Garrick Sherman (I)	6 ft 10 in (2.08 m)	251 lb (114 kg)	Jr	Kenton / Michigan State	Kenton, Ohio
G	12	Alex Dragicevich	6 ft 7 in (2.01 m)	221 lb (100 kg)	So	Glenbrook North	Northbrook, Illinois
F	14	Scott Martin (C)	6 ft 8 in (2.03 m)	222 lb (101 kg)	Sr	Valparaiso / Purdue	Valparaiso, Indiana
F	21	Tim Abromaitis (injured) (C)	6 ft 8 in (2.03 m)	236 lb (107 kg)	GS	Farmington	Unionville, Connecticut
G	22	Jerian Grant	6 ft 5 in (1.96 m)	195 lb (88 kg)	So	DeMatha	Bowie, Maryland
G/F	24	Pat Connaughton	6 ft 5 in (1.96 m)	206 lb (93 kg)	Fr	St. John's Prep	Arlington, Massachusetts
F	25	Tom Knight	6 ft 9 in (2.06 m)	250 lb (113 kg)	Jr	Dirigo	Dixfield, Maine
G	32	Joey Brooks	6 ft 5 in (1.96 m)	220 lb (100 kg)	Jr	Strake Jesuit College Prep	Houston, Texas
F	33	Mike Broghammer	6 ft 9 in (2.06 m)	265 lb (120 kg)	Jr	Hopkins	Orono, Minnesota
F	45	Jack Cooley	6 ft 9 in (2.06 m)	248 lb (112 kg)	Jr	Glenbrook South	Glenview, Illinois

Head coach

- Mike Brey

Assistant coach(es)

- Anthony Solomon
- Rod Balanis
- Martin Ingelsby

Legend

- (C) Team captain
- (S) Suspended
- (I) Ineligible
- (W) Walk-on
- Injured
- Current redshirt

Roster
Last update: 2011-11-30

- Sherman is not eligible to play under NCAA transfer rules.

== Schedule and results ==
- All times are Eastern

Date time, TV	Rank^{#}	Opponent^{#}	Result	Record	Site (attendance) city, state
Exhibition
11/1/2011*; 7:30pm		St. Xavier	W 90–72		Edmund P. Joyce Center (6,578); Notre Dame, IN
11/7/2011*; 7:30pm		Stonehill College	W 92–70		Edmund P. Joyce Center (6,567); Notre Dame, IN
Regular Season
11/12/2011*; 2:00pm		Mississippi Valley State	W 80–67	1–0	Edmund P. Joyce Center (7,087); Notre Dame, IN
11/14/2011*; 9:00pm, ESPNU		Detroit; CBE Classic	W 59–53	2–0	Edmund P. Joyce Center (6,720); Notre Dame, IN
11/16/2011*; 7:30pm		Sam Houston State; CBE Classic	W 74–41	3–0	Edmund P. Joyce Center (6,614); Notre Dame, IN
11/18/2011*; 9:00pm		Delaware State	W 93–69	4–0	Edmund P. Joyce Center (8,826); Notre Dame, IN
11/21/2011*; 7:30pm, ESPN2		vs. No. 21 Missouri; CBE Classic	L 58–87	4–1	Sprint Center (11,436); Kansas City, MO
11/22/2011*; 7:45pm, ESPNU		vs. Georgia; CBE Classic	L 57–61	4–2	Sprint Center (10,747); Kansas City, MO
11/27/2011*; 2:00pm		Bryant	W 84–59	5–2	Edmund P. Joyce Center (7,138); Notre Dame, IN
11/30/2011*; 11:15 pm, ESPN2		at No. 18 Gonzaga	L 53–73	5–3	McCarthey Athletic Center (6,000); Spokane, WA
12/4/2011*; 4:45 pm, MASN/Versus		vs. Maryland; BB&T Classic	L 71–78	5–4	Verizon Center (10,714); Washington, DC
12/8/2011*; 7:30 pm		Maine	W 87–78	6–4	Edmund P. Joyce Center (7,024); Notre Dame, IN
12/10/2011*; 7:30 pm		Dartmouth	W 65–47	7–4	Edmund P. Joyce Center (7,651); Notre Dame, IN
12/17/2011*; 4:30 pm, ESPN2		vs. No. 18 Indiana; Crossroads Classic	L 58–69	7–5	Conseco Fieldhouse (19,064); Indianapolis, IN
12/19/2011*; 7:30 pm		Sacred Heart	W 106–65	8–5	Edmund P. Joyce Center (7,042); Notre Dame, IN
Big East Regular Season
12/27/2011; 7:00 pm, ESPN2		No. 22 Pittsburgh	W 72–59	9–5 (1–0)	Edmund P. Joyce Center (8,231); Notre Dame, IN
1/4/2012; 7:00 pm, Big East Network		at Cincinnati	L 55–71	9–6 (1–1)	Fifth Third Arena (10,142); Cincinnati, OH
1/7/2012; 4:00 pm, ESPNU		at No. 11 Louisville	W 67–65 ^{2OT}	10–6 (2–1)	KFC Yum! Center (22,687); Louisville, KY
1/10/2012; 7:00 pm, Big East Network		South Florida	W 60–49	11–6 (3–1)	Edmund P. Joyce Center (8,075); Notre Dame, IN
1/14/2012; 11:00 am, ESPN2		No. 17 Connecticut	L 53–67	11–7 (3–2)	Edmund P. Joyce Center (9,149); Notre Dame, IN
1/16/2012; 9:00 pm, ESPNU		at Rutgers	L 58–65	11–8 (3–3)	Louis Brown Athletic Center (6,334); Piscataway, NJ
1/21/2012; 6:00 pm, ESPN		No. 1 Syracuse	W 67–58	12–8 (4–3)	Edmund P. Joyce Center (9,149); Notre Dame, IN
1/25/2012; 8:00 pm, Big East Network		at Seton Hall	W 55–42	13–8 (5–3)	Prudential Center (8,421); Newark, NJ
1/29/2012; 12:00 pm, Big East Network		at No. 24 Connecticut	W 50–48	14–8 (6–3)	XL Center (16,294); Hartford, CT
2/4/2012; 1:00 pm, CBS		No. 15 Marquette	W 76–59	15–8 (7–3)	Edmund P. Joyce Center (9,149); Notre Dame, IN
2/8/2012; 9:00 pm, ESPNU		at West Virginia	W 55–51	16–8 (8–3)	WVU Coliseum (9,258); Morgantown, WV
2/11/2012; 12:00 pm, Big East Network		DePaul	W 84–76	17–8 (9–3)	Edmund P. Joyce Center (9,149); Notre Dame, IN
2/15/2012; 7:00 pm, ESPNU	No. 23	Rutgers	W 71–53	18–8 (10–3)	Edmund P. Joyce Center (7,557); Notre Dame, IN
2/18/2012; 9:00 pm, ESPNU	No. 23	at Villanova	W 74–70 ^{OT}	19–8 (11–3)	Wells Fargo Center (15,939); Philadelphia, PA
2/22/2012; 7:00 pm, ESPN2	No. 20	West Virginia	W 71–44	20–8 (12–3)	Edmund P. Joyce Center (8,265); Notre Dame, IN
2/25/2012; 12:00 pm, ESPN2	No. 20	at St. John's	L 58–61	20–9 (12–4)	Madison Square Garden (11,436); New York, NY
2/27/2012; 7:00 pm, ESPN	No. 20	at No. 11 Georgetown	L 41–59	20–10 (12–5)	Verizon Center (14,514); Washington, DC
3/2/2012; 7:00 pm, Big East Network	No. 20	Providence	W 75–69	21–10 (13–5)	Edmund P. Joyce Center (9,149); Notre Dame, IN
Big East tournament
3/8/2012; 9:00 pm, ESPN	No. 23	vs. South Florida; Quarterfinals	W 57–53 ^{OT}	22–10	Madison Square Garden (20,057); New York, NY
3/9/2012; 9:00 pm, ESPN	No. 23	vs. Louisville; Semifinals	L 50–64	22–11	Madison Square Garden (20,057); New York, NY
NCAA tournament
3/16/2012*; 9:45 pm, CBS	(S 7) No. 23	vs. (S 10) Xavier; Second Round	L 63–67	22–12	Greenboro Coliseum (16,523); Greensboro, NC
*Non-conference game. ^{#}Rankings from AP poll. (#) Tournament seedings in parentheses. All times are in Eastern Time. (#) during NCAA Tournament is seed with Region.
