= Zach Auguste =

American basketball player (born 1993)

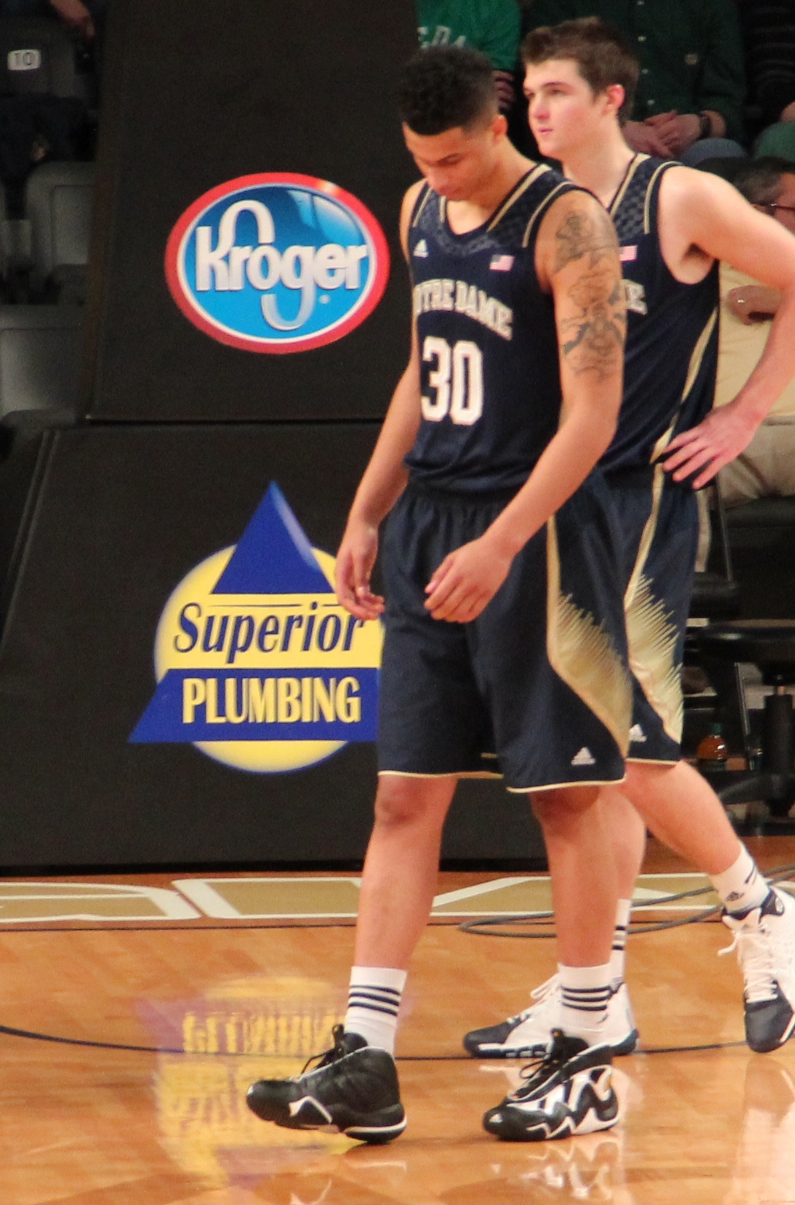
- Auguste (front) playing against Georgia Tech

No. 0 – Shiga Lakes
- Position: Center
- League: B.League

Personal information
- Born: July 8, 1993 (age 33) Cambridge, Massachusetts, U.S.
- Listed height: 6 ft 10 in (2.08 m)
- Listed weight: 240 lb (109 kg)

Career information
- High school: Marlborough (Marlborough, Massachusetts); New Hampton School (New Hampton, New Hampshire)
- College: Notre Dame (2012–2016)
- NBA draft: 2016: undrafted
- Playing career: 2016–present

Career history
- 2016–2017: Uşak Sportif
- 2017–2018: Panathinaikos
- 2018–2020: Galatasaray
- 2020–2021: Panathinaikos
- 2021–2022: Cedevita Olimpija
- 2022–2023: Frutti Extra Bursaspor
- 2023–2025: SeaHorses Mikawa
- 2025–present: Shiga Lakes

Career highlights
- 2x Greek League champion (2018, 2021); Greek Cup winner (2021); Slovenian Cup winner (2022); Third-team All-ACC (2016)
- Stats at Basketball Reference
Medals
Men's basketball
Representing the United States
FIBA AmeriCup
Bronze medal – third place	2025 Managua

Zachary Elias Auguste (Greek: Ζαχαρίας Ηλίας "Ζακ" Όγκαστ; born July 8, 1993) is a Greek-American professional basketball player for the Shiga Lakes of the B.League. He is a 6-foot-10-inch (2.08 m) center. He played college basketball for the Fighting Irish.

Born in Cambridge, Massachusetts, Auguste started playing high school basketball for Marlborough. In 2011, he moved to the university preparatory New Hampton School in New Hampshire, where he was nominated for the 2012 McDonald's All-American Game. After graduating from New Hampton, Auguste enrolled at Notre Dame, and after spending his freshman and sophomore seasons mainly as a reserve player, he rose to prominence during his junior season in 2014–15, when Notre Dame won the ACC tournament title, and went to the NCAA Elite Eight.

== High school career ==
Auguste played at Marlborough High School for three seasons, growing 3 inches in each of these seasons. As a junior in 2009–10, Auguste averaged 22 points and received All-Star accolades from the Mid-Wachusett (Central Massachusetts) league and local newspapers the Telegram & Gazette and The MetroWest Daily News. He scored a total 631 points throughout his career at Marlborough.

He moved to university preparatory New Hampton School after that season, reclassifying to the class of 2012. He cited his desire to get academically and physically ready for college as the main factors behind that decision. After adapting to the higher competition level, he improved dramatically in time, putting on 28 pounds and developing his post game to transition from a perimeter player to a forward. He finished with an average of 15 points and 8 rebounds for his senior season. Nominated for the 2012 McDonald's All-American Boys Game, he didn't make the final selection.

Soon after joining New Hampton, he was noticed by Atlantic Coast Conference (ACC) conference Notre Dame's assistant coach Anthony Solomon, however he later cut the school from his selection list, which included Division I schools West Virginia, Georgia Tech, Florida and Marquette. Despite this, Solomon's steadfast attempts to recruit the player, widely ranked a 4-star recruit, convinced Auguste to visit the campus; he committed to Notre Dame on the spot in September 2011.

College recruiting
Name	Hometown	School	Height	Weight	Commit date
Zach Auguste; PF	Marlborough, MA	New Hampton School	6 ft 9 in (2.06 m)	205 lb (93 kg)	Sep 23, 2011
Zach Auguste; PF	Recruit ratings: Scout: Rivals: 247Sports: (90)				
Overall recruit ranking: Scout: 22 (PF) Rivals: 97, 23 (PF) 247Sports: 101, 27 (PF) ESPN: 25 (PF)
Note: In many cases, Scout, Rivals, 247Sports, On3, and ESPN may conflict in their listings of height and weight.; In these cases, the average was taken. ESPN grades are on a 100-point scale.; Sources: "Notre Dame 2012 Basketball Commitments". Rivals.; "2012 Notre Dame Commits". Scout.; "2012 Player Commitments – Notre Dame". ESPN.; "Scout.com Team Recruiting Rankings". Scout.; "2012 Team Ranking". Rivals.

== College career ==
Auguste made his debut for Notre Dame in a November 12, 2012 victory against Monmouth, contributing 4 points and 3 rebounds in 3 minutes. After two ankle sprains during pre-season practice, Auguste had difficulty breaking into the already established team. Finding himself behind Jack Cooley and Garrick Sherman in the rotation, he averaged 10.7 minutes per game in 25 games. Notable were games against Kennesaw State (12 points and 7 rebounds in 12 minutes) and Marquette (a season-high 15 points with 5 rebounds and 3 steals in 21 minutes), for a freshman season average of 3.7 points and 2.7 rebounds.

For the 2013–14 season, Auguste was expected to play a larger role after Cooley graduated and coach Mike Brey cited him as a major player. Though he did start 13 games out of 30, he stayed third choice with Sherman and Tom Knight preferred. He recorded his first college double-double against Clemson having 14 points and 12 rebounds, followed by no-shows. He finished his sophomore season with 6.7 points and 4.3 rebounds in nearly 17 minutes per game on average.

Tabbed as a starter during the preseason, Auguste, as one of the team's few post options, established himself as a starter during his junior season with good performances early in the season, albeit against weaker opposition. A memorable December 13, 2014 game against Florida State, in which he scored a career-high 26 points, started what coach Brey described as a run of key contributions from the forward, with Auguste quickly recouping from his bad performances. In January 2015, Auguste was sidelined by Notre Dame due to academic issues, with the length of the suspension undisclosed. It would ultimately only last three days, with the unknown reason later described as minor by the player. Auguste was seen as a major contributor to the Irish's 2015 ACC tournament title contributing 16 points and 13 rebounds in the final against North Carolina (for an average of more than 11 points and 9 rebounds in the whole tournament).

In the Round of 64 of the following 2015 NCAA tournament, Auguste scored 25 points against Northeastern, including two under-pressure free-throws in the final minute of a 69–65 close-fought win. In the next round tie against Butler, he committed a double dribble that conceded possession with two seconds left on the clock in a tied 55–55 game. Butler did not score, and in overtime Auguste blocked a shot before grabbing a rebound – a team-leading 13th – as Notre Dame won to reach the Sweet 16. A comfortable win over Wichita State followed (15 points, 6 rebounds and 1 block for Auguste in 26 minutes) and Notre Dame qualified to the Elite Eight for the first time since 1979. Auguste, described as "Notre Dame's only true post player", was predicted to play an important role in the game against undefeated Kentucky, who – in Karl-Anthony Towns and Willie Cauley-Stein – had some of the biggest forwards of the tournament. He had 20 points and nine rebounds in the game, while mostly defended by Towns. In defense against the same player, he could not stop him from scoring 25 points in a to-the-wire 66–68 loss to the favorites. Auguste finished the tournament with 16.8 points and 8.3 rebounds per game, with 12.9 points and 6.5 rebounds in around 24 minutes for the whole 2014–15 season.

Auguste was elected captain by his teammates for his senior season. He was also voted to the Preseason All-ACC second team. Seven games into the 2015–16 season, Auguste tallied his fifth double-double of the season, tying the total of his first three seasons. He was named as one of ten finalists for the Kareem Abdul-Jabbar Award, also earning third team all-ACC honors for the season. In the quarter-final of the 2016 ACC tournament Auguste led his team to an 84–79 win versus Duke, posting a double-double with 19 points and 22 rebounds, setting the Notre Dame's record for most rebounds in a game and tying Tim Duncan's second best performance in the ACC Tournament.

=== College statistics ===
Legend
GP	Games played	GS	Games started	MPG	Minutes per game
FG%	Field goal percentage	3P%	3-point field goal percentage	FT%	Free throw percentage
RPG	Rebounds per game	APG	Assists per game	SPG	Steals per game
BPG	Blocks per game	PPG	Points per game	**Bold**	Career high

Year	Team	GP	GS	MPG	FG%	3P%	FT%	RPG	APG	SPG	BPG	PPG
2012–13	Notre Dame	25	0	10.7	.520	.000	**.682**	2.7	.2	.4	.5	3.7
2013–14	Notre Dame	30	13	16.3	.509	.000	.483	4.3	.3	.4	.4	6.7
2014–15	Notre Dame	**37**	**36**	24.4	**.619**	.000	.636	6.5	.8	**.7**	.7	12.9
2015–16	Notre Dame	36	**36**	**29.6**	.560	.000	.628	**10.7**	**1.1**	.6	**1.1**	**14.0**
Career		128	85	21.3	.567	.000	.613	6.4	.6	.5	.7	10.0

== Professional career ==
=== 2016–2017 season ===
After not being drafted in the 2016 NBA draft, Auguste joined the Los Angeles Lakers' summer league squad for the 2016 Las Vegas Summer League. He appeared in 4 games, and averaged 5.3 points and 4 rebounds per game. On August 29, 2016, he signed a contract with the Lakers, but he was waived on October 12, without playing in any regular season NBA games with the team.

On October 27, he signed with Muratbey Uşak Sportif of the Turkish Super League, for the 2016–17 season. He made his professional debut on November 5, 2016, going scoreless against İstanbul BŞB, in a Turkish BSL game. In January 2017, Auguste scored 31 points and grabbed 14 rebounds, to help his team get past Polish team Rosa Radom, which earned him the Game Day 11 MVP award of the Champions League 2016–17 season.

He averaged 11.7 points, 7.5 rebounds, 0.6 assists, 0.7 steals, and 0.4 blocks per game, in 23 games played in the Turkish Super League. He also averaged 13.4 points, 8.8 rebounds, 0.6 assists, 0.5 steals, and 0.6 blocks per game, in 11 games played in the European-wide 3rd-tier level Champions League. After his club was parachuted down into the European-wide 4th-tier level FIBA Europe Cup, he averaged 17.8 points, 8.5 rebounds, 0.8 assists, 1.5 steals, and 0.5 blocks per game, in 4 games played in the FIBA Europe Cup 2016–17 season.

=== 2017–2018 season ===
Auguste then played with the Miami Heat's summer league squad for the 2017 Las Vegas Summer League. He averaged 10 points, 5.2 rebounds, 1.2 assists, 0.4 steals, and 0.4 blocks per game in the Las Vegas Summer League, and 7.3 points, 6.3 rebounds, 0.3 assists, 2.0 steals, and 0.3 blocks per game in the Orlando Summer League. On June 30, 2017, Auguste signed a one-year deal with Greek club Panathinaikos, at a salary of €500,000 net income.

=== 2018–2019 season ===
Auguste signed with Galatasaray of the Turkish Basketball Super League (BSL) and the EuroCup on August 7, 2018.

=== 2019–2020 season ===
On July 23, 2019, Auguste renewed his contract with Galatasaray for another season.

=== 2020–2021 season ===
On July 20, 2020, Auguste officially returned to the Greek Basket League and Panathinaikos for a second stint with the EuroLeague club, signing a two-year (1+1) contract.

=== 2021–2022 season ===
He played for the Boston Celtics in the 2021 NBA summer league, scoring 2 points on 1–2 shooting and taking 5 rebounds in 16-minutes at his debut, a 85–83 win against the Atlanta Hawks. On August 23, 2021, Auguste signed with Cedevita Olimpija of the ABA League First Division and the EuroCup.

=== 2022–2023 season ===
On July 9, 2022, he has signed with Frutti Extra Bursaspor of the Turkish Basketbol Süper Ligi (BSL).

=== 2023–2024 season ===
On June 20, 2023, he signed with SeaHorses Mikawa[of the B.League.

== National team career ==
Auguste was selected to the senior Greek national basketball team's 16 man preliminary squad for the EuroBasket 2017.

== Personal life ==
Auguste was born in Cambridge, Massachusetts, to Jean Bazile Auguste and Lea Tzimoulis. His father, was a former semi-professional soccer player, from Haiti, whose uncle is Christophe Dardompre, a former Colonel of the Haitian Army. His mother is of Greek heritage. His maternal great-grandfather, Louis, immigrated to the U.S. from Agia Sotira, Greece in 1949. He has one child with girlfriend, Paris Vaughn.

Auguste has dual citizenship with the United States and Greece. He has stated that he speaks Greek and Haitian Creole fluently, in addition to his native English. He has a son born in August 2020.

== See also ==
- List of Greek Americans
- List of Haitian Americans
