= Pat Connaughton =

American basketball and baseball player (born 1993)

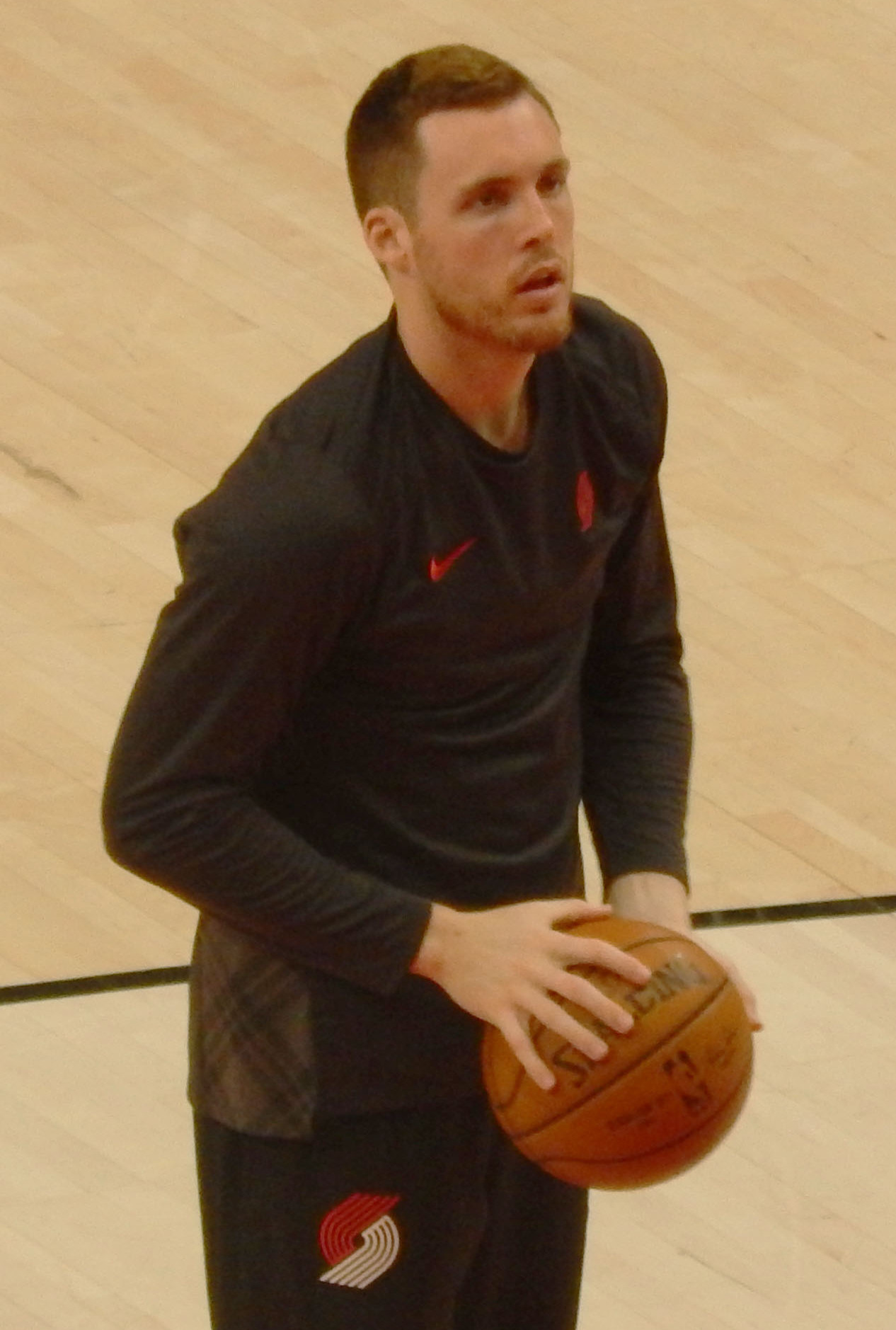
- Connaughton with the Portland Trail Blazers in 2018

Free agent
- Position: Shooting guard

Personal information
- Born: January 6, 1993 (age 33) Arlington, Massachusetts, U.S.
- Listed height: 6 ft 5 in (1.96 m)
- Listed weight: 209 lb (95 kg)

Career information
- High school: St. John's Prep (Danvers, Massachusetts)
- College: Notre Dame (2011–2015)
- NBA draft: 2015: 2nd round, 41st overall pick
- Drafted by: Brooklyn Nets
- Playing career: 2015–present

Career history
- 2015–2018: Portland Trail Blazers
- 2018–2025: Milwaukee Bucks
- 2025–2026: Charlotte Hornets

Career highlights
- NBA champion (2021); NBA Cup champion (2024); Third-team All-ACC (2015)
- Stats at NBA.com
- Stats at Basketball Reference

Pat Connaughton
- Born: January 6, 1993 (age 33)
- Bats: Right Throws: Right

Minor League debut
- July 1, 2014, for the Aberdeen IronBirds
- Stats at Baseball Reference

Patrick Bergin Connaughton (/ˈkɒnətən/ KON-ə-tən; born January 6, 1993) is an American professional basketball player who last played for the Charlotte Hornets of the National Basketball Association (NBA), where he primarily plays as a shooting guard. He is also a former professional baseball player.

Connaughton previously played for the Notre Dame Fighting Irish baseball and men's basketball teams. He was selected by the Baltimore Orioles in the fourth round of the 2014 MLB draft. The Brooklyn Nets selected him in the second round of the 2015 NBA draft and traded him to the Portland Trail Blazers. In 2021, during his sixth season in the NBA, he won a championship with the Milwaukee Bucks.

== High school career ==
Connaughton attended St. John's Preparatory School in Danvers, Massachusetts, where he starred in three sports, playing quarterback in football and multiple positions in both baseball and basketball. He received major interest in baseball from schools in the National Collegiate Athletic Association (NCAA) Division I, with Boston College (BC), the University of Virginia, and his original first choice, the University of North Carolina at Chapel Hill, who all made him scholarship offers.

Connaughton's sporting trajectory changed during the summer between his junior and senior years. At that time, he had only received a basketball offer from home-state Bentley University, in NCAA's Division II. He suddenly emerged as a major basketball prospect after what ESPN.com writer Jeff Goodman called "one spectacular week" at the Amateur Athletic Union national tournament in Orlando, Florida, including a game where he had 33 points and 20 rebounds. Connaughton himself would later say, "That week completely changed my entire life." He then began receiving multiple offers in basketball as well as baseball, with many schools willing to let him play both sports. He eventually chose the University of Notre Dame over BC, the University of Miami, the University of California, Los Angeles, and Vanderbilt University.

In 2011, Connaughton's senior year, he was named the Gatorade Massachusetts Boys Basketball Player of the Year. As a pitcher for the baseball team, he had an 11–2 win–loss record with a 1.75 earned run average (ERA) and 160 strikeouts in 90 innings pitched as a senior. According to the baseball scouting site Perfect Game, Connaughton was rated as the 33rd-best player in that year's Major League Baseball (MLB) draft, but he fell to the 4th round, where he was selected by the San Diego Padres, when he made it clear he planned to attend college. He followed through on his commitment to Notre Dame, choosing not to sign with the Padres.

== College career ==
At Notre Dame, Connaughton played for the Notre Dame Fighting Irish as a member of their college baseball and college basketball teams. In his freshman year for the basketball team, Connaughton was one of three players to appear in all of Notre Dame's 34 games. He averaged 7.0 points per game, 4.4 rebounds per game, and 0.9 assists per game while playing 24.1 minutes per game. The Fighting Irish appeared in the 2012 NCAA Men's Division I Basketball Tournament, but lost to Xavier University in the second round. Connaughton scored 10 points with two assists and two rebounds in 34 minutes of play during the loss. He then joined the baseball team as a relief pitcher.

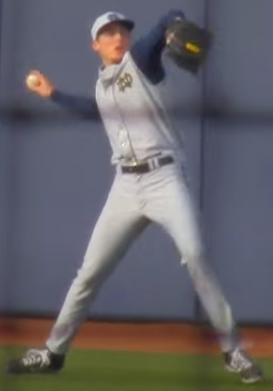
Connaughton warming up before a game with the Notre Dame Fighting Irish baseball team in 2013

As a sophomore, in 2013, Connaughton averaged 8.9 points per game for the basketball team, and had a 1.71 ERA for the baseball team. In the summer of 2013, he pitched in collegiate summer baseball for the Harwich Mariners of the Cape Cod Baseball League. In his junior year, he averaged 13.8 PPG for the basketball team and had a 3.92 ERA in ten games started, which included two complete games, for the baseball team.

After his junior year, he was forthright about his intent to return to Notre Dame for his senior basketball season, despite warnings that it would impact his prospects for the upcoming baseball draft. He was drafted by the Baltimore Orioles of Major League Baseball (MLB) in the fourth round, with the 121st overall selection, of the 2014 MLB draft. One high-ranking MLB executive believed that Connaughton would have been drafted in the first two rounds had he not been committed to returning to Notre Dame for his senior basketball season, telling Goodman, "He definitely cost himself some money," as he expected Connaughton could have earned $1 million if he was willing to quit basketball. He agreed to terms with the Orioles, receiving a signing bonus of over $400,000, with the Orioles permitting Connaughton to play basketball for the Irish in his senior year.

As a senior, Notre Dame's basketball team won its first Atlantic Coast Conference (ACC) championship. He took part in a 2015 tournament game against Kentucky for a Final Four berth, narrowly lost by his team after having sustained a lead until the six-second mark. Connaughton was determined to finish his degree at Notre Dame, and had a 3.0 grade point average with the university's Mendoza College of Business. He ultimately graduated from Notre Dame in spring 2015.

== Professional baseball career ==
Connaughton made his professional baseball debut with the Aberdeen IronBirds of the Low-A New York–Penn League, in which he registered a 96 miles per hour (154 km/h) fastball. At the end of July 2014, he left the IronBirds to return to the Fighting Irish basketball team. Even though the Orioles allowed him to pursue an NBA career, they never made any attempts to recoup the $428,000 signing bonus. As a result, the ballclub continued to control his contractual baseball rights through 2020, which could have been extended for six additional years if Baltimore placed him on its major league roster. The Orioles did not add him to their major league roster in that span, meaning Connaughton would be free to sign with any team if he decided to return to baseball.

== Professional basketball career ==
=== Portland Trail Blazers (2015–2018) ===
Connaughton was drafted with the 41st pick by the Brooklyn Nets in the 2015 NBA draft. His draft rights, along with Mason Plumlee, were then traded to the Portland Trail Blazers for Steve Blake and the draft rights to the 23rd pick in the draft, Rondae Hollis-Jefferson. He signed a three-year deal with the Trail Blazers on July 9. The first two years of the contract were guaranteed, with the stipulation that Connaughton would not be allowed to play professional baseball during that timespan. He made his debut for the Trail Blazers on October 30, 2015, scoring five points in a loss to the Phoenix Suns. He appeared in 34 games for the Trail Blazers as a rookie.

On April 13, 2017, in the Blazers' 2016–17 season finale, Connaughton scored a then career-high 19 points in a 103–100 loss to the New Orleans Pelicans.

In the Trail Blazers' 2017–18 season opener on October 18, 2017, Connaughton scored a then career-high 24 points while making 4 of 6 3-pointers in a 124–76 win over the Phoenix Suns.

=== Milwaukee Bucks (2018–2025) ===
On August 1, 2018, Connaughton signed a two-year, $3.3 million contract with the Milwaukee Bucks. He competed in the Slam Dunk Contest at the 2020 NBA All-Star Game, dunking over Milwaukee Brewers outfielder Christian Yelich and finishing third in the tournament.

On August 20, 2020, Connaughton scored 15 points and grabbed 11 rebounds in a 111–96 Game 2 win during the Bucks' first round postseason matchup against the Orlando Magic. On November 23, Connaughton re-signed on a three-year, $16 million contract to stay in Milwaukee.

Connaughton won his first NBA championship on July 20, 2021, averaging 9.2 points per game and 5.8 rebounds per game while shooting 44.1% from three-point range in six games in the NBA Finals as the Bucks defeated the Phoenix Suns.

On November 10, 2021, Connaughton scored a season-high 23 points and made a career-high seven three-point shots during a 112–100 win over the New York Knicks. On February 14, 2022, he underwent right hand surgery and was ruled out for at least a month. On April 27, during the first round of the 2022 NBA Playoffs, Connaughton scored 20 points in just 23 minutes of playing time in a decisive 116–100 Game 5 win over the Chicago Bulls.

On June 22, 2022, Connaughton opted into his $5.7M player option to remain with the Bucks. Later, on July 13, Connaughton signed a three-year, $28.5 million contract extension with the Bucks. On January 26, 2023, Connaughton scored 19 points and recorded a season-high 12 rebounds during a 107–99 win over the Denver Nuggets. He made 61 appearances (including 33 starts) for Milwaukee during the 2022–23 NBA season, averaging 7.6 points, 4.6 rebounds, and 1.3 assists. Connaughton played in 76 games (starting three) for the Bucks in the 2023–24 season, averaging 5.6 points, 3.1 rebounds, and 2.1 assists.

On April 13, 2025, Connaughton scored a career-high 43 points in a 140–133 win over the Detroit Pistons. He made 41 appearances (including one start) for the Bucks during the 2024–25 season, recording averages of 5.3 points, 2.7 rebounds, and 1.7 assists.

=== Charlotte Hornets (2025–2026) ===
On July 6, 2025, Connaughton was traded to the Charlotte Hornets alongside two second-round picks in exchange for Vasilije Micić.

On February 4, 2026, Connaughton was waived by the Hornets. However, he was re-signed by the team on February 9 to a two-year, $5.1 million contract.

== Career statistics ==
Legend
GP	Games played	GS	Games started	MPG	Minutes per game
FG%	Field goal percentage	3P%	3-point field goal percentage	FT%	Free throw percentage
RPG	Rebounds per game	APG	Assists per game	SPG	Steals per game
BPG	Blocks per game	PPG	Points per game	**Bold**	Career high
†	Won an NBA championship	*	Led the league

=== NBA ===
==== Regular season ====
Year	Team	GP	GS	MPG	FG%	3P%	FT%	RPG	APG	SPG	BPG	PPG
2015–16	Portland	34	0	4.2	.265	.238	**1.000**	.9	.3	.1	.0	1.1
2016–17	Portland	39	1	8.1	**.514**	**.515**	.778	1.3	.7	.2	.1	2.5
2017–18	Portland	**82***	5	18.1	.423	.352	.841	2.0	1.1	.3	.3	5.4
2018–19	Milwaukee	61	2	20.7	.466	.330	.725	4.2	2.0	.5	.4	6.9
2019–20	Milwaukee	67	4	18.6	.455	.331	.775	4.2	1.6	.4	.5	5.4
2020–21†	Milwaukee	69	4	22.8	.434	.371	.775	**4.8**	1.6	.2	**.7**	6.8
2021–22	Milwaukee	65	19	**26.0**	.458	.395	.833	4.2	1.3	**.9**	.2	**9.9**
2022–23	Milwaukee	61	**33**	23.7	.392	.339	.659	4.6	1.3	.6	.2	7.6
2023–24	Milwaukee	76	3	22.1	.435	.345	.759	3.1	**2.1**	.5	.3	5.6
2024–25	Milwaukee	41	1	14.7	.469	.321	.774	2.7	1.7	.2	.3	5.3
2025–26	Charlotte	42	0	7.1	.447	.404	.650	1.5	.4	.3	.0	2.6
Career		637	72	18.4	.438	.357	.767	3.3	1.3	.5	.3	5.8

==== Playoffs ====
Year	Team	GP	GS	MPG	FG%	3P%	FT%	RPG	APG	SPG	BPG	PPG
2016	Portland	6	0	1.3	**.600**	**.667**	.000	.2	.0	.0	.0	1.3
2017	Portland	3	0	8.0	.222	.000	**1.000**	2.3	1.3	.0	.0	2.3
2018	Portland	4	0	14.8	.400	.200	**1.000**	1.0	1.5	.3	.3	4.0
2019	Milwaukee	15	0	21.6	.481	.357	.500	**6.2**	1.4	.4	**.9**	6.2
2020	Milwaukee	10	0	17.1	.429	.348	**1.000**	3.8	1.1	.2	.2	4.0
2021†	Milwaukee	**23***	**1**	23.7	.462	.389	.846	4.4	1.4	.4	.3	7.5
2022	Milwaukee	12	0	**26.5**	.477	.391	**1.000**	4.3	.9	.4	.3	9.5
2023	Milwaukee	4	0	22.1	.567	.478	.750	5.0	1.8	**1.0**	.3	**12.0**
2024	Milwaukee	6	0	20.7	.440	.273	**1.000**	3.8	**2.2**	**1.0**	.2	4.5
2025	Milwaukee	3	0	4.7	.250	.250	.500	.7	.3	.0	.0	2.0
Career		86	1	19.5	.462	.370	.805	4.0	1.1	.4	.3	6.0

=== College ===
Year	Team	GP	GS	MPG	FG%	3P%	FT%	RPG	APG	SPG	BPG	PPG
2011–12	Notre Dame	34	18	24.1	.423	.342	.757	4.4	.9	.5	.1	7.0
2012–13	Notre Dame	35	35	32.1	.445	.377	.708	4.7	2.1	.5	.3	8.9
2013–14	Notre Dame	32	32	**37.2**	.452	.378	**.833**	7.1	**3.0**	**1.0**	.6	**13.8**
2014–15	Notre Dame	**38**	**38**	35.6	**.466**	**.423**	.781	**7.4**	1.5	.7	**.9**	12.5
Career		139	123	32.3	.450	.386	.777	5.9	1.8	.7	.5	10.5

== Personal life ==
In Goodman's 2015 story on Connaughton and his decision between two sports, many key individuals in his life testified to his character. His father Len noted, "Patrick is of high moral character and wasn't going to lie to people. That eliminated a bunch of [MLB] teams from taking him at all." Notre Dame head basketball coach Mike Brey added, "In my 15 years here, no one has been more responsible than Pat Connaughton. He's an unbelievable ambassador for us and has shown tremendous loyalty." Family adviser Sam Samardzija, brother of former San Francisco Giants pitcher and former Notre Dame baseball and football star Jeff Samardzija, said about Connaughton, "He's not common—kind of like Jeff and [NFL quarterback] Russell Wilson. Not a lot of guys like him come around. He's just wired differently."

Connaughton said he only allowed himself one luxury with his signing bonus, buying a new Jeep Wrangler. He told Goodman, "The signing bonus is a ton of money, especially for a 21-year-old. But I'm not going to live off that money. At some point, I'm going to live off a college degree."

Connaughton is the president of a development firm. In March 2020, Connaughton and the firm drew criticism for razing a historic building to make way for a new apartment complex in Milwaukee. He has invested in Bitcoin.

Connaughton and professional soccer player Ryan Gareis announced their relationship in June 2023. In January 2024, they announced Gareis was pregnant with their child, and in February 2024, the couple announced their engagement. Their son was born in May 2024. In June 2026, Pat and Gareis announced that they were married.

== See also ==
- List of multi-sport athletes
