= Crossroads Classic =

Former American college basketball event

Locations of Butler, Indiana, Notre Dame and Purdue

The Crossroads Classic was a four-team college basketball event held annually at Gainbridge Fieldhouse in Indianapolis, Indiana, United States. It featured Indiana's four most accomplished men's NCAA Division I basketball schools each year - being the Butler Bulldogs, the Indiana Hoosiers, the Notre Dame Fighting Irish, and the Purdue Boilermakers. In odd numbered years, Notre Dame played Indiana while Butler played Purdue. In even numbered years, Notre Dame played Purdue while Butler played Indiana. Purdue and Indiana did not play each other in the Classic, as they are Big Ten conference rivals. As a result, Butler and Notre Dame did not play each other in the Classic either.

== History ==
The event was the brainchild of former Purdue athletic director Morgan Burke. It was designed to replicate a previous basketball event, the Hoosier Classic, which dated back to the 1940s. The Hoosier Classic was also a two-game non-conference showcase between Indiana, Purdue, Notre Dame and Butler. The games were held at Butler's Hinkle Fieldhouse.

In 2014, the athletic directors at the four participating schools announced that the Crossroads Classic had been renewed through 2021.

In 2016, for the first time in history, all four teams entered the Crossroads Classic ranked in the top 25.

In 2022 the Crossroad Classic was replaced by the Indy Classic.

== Results by year ==
Year	Date	Winning Team	Score	Losing Team	TV
2011	December 17	Butler	67–65	Purdue	CBS
2011	December 17	#18 Indiana	69–58	Notre Dame	ESPN2
2012	December 15	Butler	88–86 ^{OT}	#1 Indiana	CBS
2012	December 15	#22 Notre Dame	81–68	Purdue	ESPN2
2013	December 14	Notre Dame	79–72	Indiana	ESPN
2013	December 14	Butler	76–70	Purdue	BTN
2014	December 20	Indiana	82–73	#23 Butler	FS1
2014	December 20	#21 Notre Dame	94–63	Purdue	BTN
2015	December 19	Indiana	80–73	Notre Dame	ESPN2
2015	December 19	#17 Butler	74–68	#9 Purdue	BTN
2016	December 17	#15 Purdue	86–81	#21 Notre Dame	ESPN2
2016	December 17	#18 Butler	83–78	#9 Indiana	BTN
2017	December 16	#17 Purdue	82–67	Butler	Fox
2017	December 16	Indiana	80–77 ^{OT}	#18 Notre Dame	Fox
2018	December 15	Notre Dame	88–80	Purdue	CBS
2018	December 15	#25 Indiana	71–68	Butler	CBS
2019	December 21	Indiana	62–60	Notre Dame	ESPN
2019	December 21	#17 Butler	70–61	Purdue	BTN
2020	December 19	Indiana	68–60	Butler	FS1
2020	December 19	Purdue	88–78	Notre Dame	ESPN2
2021	December 18	#3 Purdue	77–48	Butler	Fox
2021	December 18	Indiana	64–56	Notre Dame	Fox

== All-time records by team ==
Team	Record	Percentage	vs. BU	vs. IU	vs. ND	vs. PU
Butler	6–5	.545	-	2-3	-	4-2
Indiana	8–3	.727	3-2	-	5-1	-
Notre Dame	4–7	.364	-	1-5	-	3-2
Purdue	4–7	.364	2-4	-	2-3	-
