= 2018–19 Notre Dame Fighting Irish men's basketball team =

American college basketball season

2018–19 Notre Dame Fighting Irish men's basketball
- Conference: Atlantic Coast Conference
- Record: 14–19 (3–15 ACC)
- Head coach: Mike Brey (19th season)
- Assistant coaches: Rod Balanis; Ryan Ayers; Ryan Humphrey
- Home arena: Edmund P. Joyce Center

2018–19 ACC men's basketball standings
	Conf.				Overall
Team	W		L	PCT	W		L	PCT
No. 2 Virginia	16	–	2	.889	35	–	3	.921
No. 3 North Carolina	16	–	2	.889	29	–	7	.806
No. 1 Duke †	14	–	4	.778	32	–	6	.842
No. 10 Florida State	13	–	5	.722	29	–	8	.784
No. 16 Virginia Tech	12	–	6	.667	26	–	9	.743
Syracuse	10	–	8	.556	20	–	14	.588
Louisville	10	–	8	.556	20	–	14	.588
NC State	9	–	9	.500	24	–	12	.667
Clemson	9	–	9	.500	20	–	14	.588
Georgia Tech	6	–	12	.333	14	–	18	.438
Boston College	5	–	13	.278	14	–	17	.452
Miami (FL)	5	–	13	.278	14	–	18	.438
Wake Forest	4	–	14	.222	11	–	20	.355
Pittsburgh	3	–	15	.167	14	–	19	.424
Notre Dame	3	–	15	.167	14	–	19	.424
† 2019 ACC tournament winner Rankings from AP poll

The 2018–19 Notre Dame Fighting Irish men's basketball team represented the University of Notre Dame during the 2018–19 NCAA Division I men's basketball season. The Fighting Irish, led by 19th-year head coach Mike Brey, played their home games at Edmund P. Joyce Center in South Bend, Indiana as sixth-year members of the Atlantic Coast Conference.

== Previous season ==
The Fighting Irish finished the 2017–18 season 21–15, 8–10 in ACC play to finish tied with Syracuse for tenth place. As the No. 10 seed in the ACC tournament, they defeated Pittsburgh in the first round and Virginia Tech in the second round before losing to Duke in the quarterfinals. They were one of the last four teams not selected for the NCAA tournament and as a result earned a No. 1 seed in the National Invitation Tournament, where they defeated Hampton in the first round before losing to Penn State in the second round.

== Offseason ==
=== Departures ===
Name	Number	Pos.	Height	Weight	Year	Hometown	Reason for departure
Austin Torres	1	F	6'7"	235	RS Senior	Granger, IN	Graduated
Matt Farrell	5	G	6'1"	175	Senior	Point Pleasant, NJ	Graduated
Matt Gregory	21	F	6'6"	204	Senior	Avon, IN	Graduated
Martinas Geben	23	F	6'10"	252	Senior	Vilnius, Lithuania	Graduated
Bonzie Colson	35	F	6'5"	224	Senior	New Bedford, MA	Graduated

=== 2018 recruiting class ===
College recruiting
Name	Hometown	School	Height	Weight	Commit date
Nate Laszewski #15 PF	Northfield, MA	Northfield-Mt. Hermon School	6 ft 9 in (2.06 m)	210 lb (95 kg)	Sep 27, 2017
Nate Laszewski #15 PF	Recruit ratings: Scout: Rivals: 247Sports: ESPN:				
Dane Goodwin #14 SG	Upper Arlington, OH	Upper Arlington High School	6 ft 5 in (1.96 m)	190 lb (86 kg)	Jul 5, 2017
Dane Goodwin #14 SG	Recruit ratings: Scout: Rivals: 247Sports: ESPN:				
Robby Carmody #21 SF	Mars, PA	Mars Area High School	6 ft 4 in (1.93 m)	185 lb (84 kg)	Jun 22, 2017
Robby Carmody #21 SF	Recruit ratings: Scout: Rivals: 247Sports: ESPN:				
Prentiss Hubb #16 SG	Upper Marlboro, MD	Gonzaga College High School	6 ft 3 in (1.91 m)	170 lb (77 kg)	May 17, 2017
Prentiss Hubb #16 SG	Recruit ratings: Scout: Rivals: 247Sports: ESPN:				
Chris Doherty #41 C	Marlborough, MA	Marlborough High School	6 ft 7 in (2.01 m)	225 lb (102 kg)	Nov 13, 2017
Chris Doherty #41 C	Recruit ratings: Scout: Rivals: 247Sports: ESPN:				
Overall recruit ranking:
Note: In many cases, Scout, Rivals, 247Sports, On3, and ESPN may conflict in their listings of height and weight.; In these cases, the average was taken. ESPN grades are on a 100-point scale.; Sources: "Notre Dame 2018 Basketball Commitments". Rivals.; "2018 Team Ranking". Rivals.

== Roster ==
2018–19 Notre Dame Fighting Irish men's basketball team
Players
Coaches

Pos.	#	Name	Height	Weight	Year	Previous school	Hometown
G	0	Rex Pflueger (redshirt)	6 ft 6 in (1.98 m)	209 lb (95 kg)	Sr	Mater Dei	Dana Point, CA
G	3	Prentiss Hubb	6 ft 3 in (1.91 m)	167 lb (76 kg)	Fr	Gonzaga	Upper Marlboro, MD
G/F	5	D. J. Harvey	6 ft 6 in (1.98 m)	225 lb (102 kg)	So	DeMatha	Bowie, MD
G	10	T. J. Gibbs	6 ft 3 in (1.91 m)	194 lb (88 kg)	Jr	Seton Hall Prep	Scotch Plains, NJ
F	11	Juwan Durham	6 ft 11 in (2.11 m)	223 lb (101 kg)	RS So	Tampa Prep/Connecticut	Tampa, FL
F	12	Elijah Burns	6 ft 8 in (2.03 m)	237 lb (108 kg)	RS Jr	Blair Academy	Troy, NY
G	13	Nikola Djogo	6 ft 7 in (2.01 m)	217 lb (98 kg)	RS So	Athlete Institute Prep	Hamilton, Ontario
F	14	Nate Laszewski	6 ft 10 in (2.08 m)	200 lb (91 kg)	Fr	Northfield Mount Hermon	Jupiter, FL
F	15	Chris Doherty	6 ft 8 in (2.03 m)	225 lb (102 kg)	Fr	Marlborough	Marlborough, MA
G	23	Dane Goodwin	6 ft 5 in (1.96 m)	203 lb (92 kg)	Fr	Upper Arlington	Upper Arlington, OH
G	24	Robby Carmody	6 ft 6 in (1.98 m)	203 lb (92 kg)	Fr	Mars Area	Mars, PA
G	25	Liam Nelligan (W)	6 ft 5 in (1.96 m)	198 lb (90 kg)	RS Sr	Benet Academy	La Grange Park, IL
F	33	John Mooney	6 ft 9 in (2.06 m)	242 lb (110 kg)	Jr	Lake Brantley	Orlando, FL

Head coach

- Mike Brey (George Washington)

Assistant coach(es)

- Rod Balanis (Georgia Tech)
- Ryan Ayers (Notre Dame)
- Ryan Humphrey (Notre Dame)

Legend

- (C) Team captain
- (S) Suspended
- (I) Ineligible
- (W) Walk-on
- Injured
- Current redshirt

Roster

== Schedule and results ==
Date time, TV	Rank^{#}	Opponent^{#}	Result	Record	High points	High rebounds	High assists	Site (attendance) city, state
Exhibition
November 1, 2018*; 7:00 pm, ACCN Extra		Central State	W 76–54		17 – Gibbs	8 – Harvey	2 – Tied	Edmund P. Joyce Center (5,627); South Bend, IN
Non-conference regular season
November 6, 2018*; 7:00 pm, ACCN Extra		UIC; Gotham Classic	W 84–67	1–0	12 – Laszewski	9 – Laszewski	3 – Gibbs	Edmund P. Joyce Center (6,462); South Bend, IN
November 8, 2018*; 7:00 pm, ACCN Extra		Chicago State	W 89–62	2–0	15 – Burns	7 – Harvey	5 – Pflueger	Edmund P. Joyce Center (6,684); South Bend, IN
November 14, 2018*; 7:00 pm, ACCN Extra		Radford; Gotham Classic	L 60–63	2–1	24 – Mooney	12 – Mooney	4 – Gibbs	Edmund P. Joyce Center (5,988); South Bend, IN
November 17, 2018*; 12:00 pm, ACCN Extra		William & Mary; Gotham Classic	W 73–64	3–1	18 – Gibbs	11 – Mooney	4 – Pflueger	Edmund P. Joyce Center (6,511); South Bend, IN
November 20, 2018*; 7:00 pm, ACCN Extra		Duquesne; Gotham Classic	W 67–56	4–1	16 – Mooney	10 – Mooney	4 – Gibbs	Edmund P. Joyce Center (6,161); South Bend, IN
November 24, 2018*; 12:00 pm, ACCN Extra		DePaul	W 95–70	5–1	20 – Pflueger	11 – Mooney	5 – Hubb	Edmund P. Joyce Center (6,751); South Bend, IN
November 27, 2018*; 7:00 pm, ESPNU		Illinois; ACC–Big Ten Challenge	W 76–74	6–1	19 – Tied	6 – Tied	4 – Tied	Edmund P. Joyce Center (8,053); South Bend, IN
December 4, 2018*; 7:00 pm, ESPN		vs. Oklahoma; Jimmy V Classic	L 80–85	6–2	18 – Gibbs	14 – Mooney	6 – Pflueger	Madison Square Garden; New York, NY
December 8, 2018*; 10:30 pm, ESPN2		at UCLA; Rivalry	L 62–65	6–3	14 – Pflueger	11 – Mooney	4 – Tied	Pauley Pavilion (12,985); Los Angeles, CA
December 15, 2018*; 1:30 pm, CBS		vs. Purdue; Crossroads Classic	W 88–80	7–3	21 – Mooney	7 – Mooney	10 – Pflueger	Bankers Life Fieldhouse; Indianapolis, IN
December 18, 2018*; 7:00 pm, ACCN Extra		Binghamton	W 69–56	8–3	16 – Tied	12 – Tied	7 – Hubb	Edmund P. Joyce Center (6,359); South Bend, IN
December 20, 2018*; 7:00 pm, ACCN Extra		Jacksonville	W 100–74	9–3	19 – Tied	7 – Tied	7 – Tied	Edmund P. Joyce Center (6,511); South Bend, IN
December 29, 2018*; 12:00 pm, ACCN Extra		Coppin State	W 63–56	10–3	15 – Gibbs	10 – Durham	5 – Gibbs	Edmund P. Joyce Center (8,086); South Bend, IN
ACC regular season
January 1, 2019; 1:00 pm, ESPNU		at No. 10 Virginia Tech	L 66–81	10–4 (0–1)	19 – Gibbs	10 – Mooney	4 – Gibbs	Cassell Coliseum (8,008); Blacksburg, VA
January 5, 2019; 12:00 pm, Raycom		Syracuse	L 62–72	10–5 (0–2)	18 – Gibbs	14 – Mooney	5 – Gibbs	Edmund P. Joyce Center (8,245); South Bend, IN
January 12, 2019; 12:00 pm, ACCRSN		Boston College	W 69–66	11–5 (1–2)	27 – Mooney	12 – Mooney	5 – Hubb	Edmund P. Joyce Center (8,442); South Bend, IN
January 15, 2019; 9:00 pm, ESPN		at No. 13 North Carolina	L 69–75	11–6 (1–3)	18 – Hubb	19 – Mooney	6 – Hubb	Dean Smith Center (20,475); Chapel Hill, NC
January 19, 2019; 2:00 pm, Raycom		No. 17 NC State	L 73–77	11–7 (1–4)	19 – Tied	16 – Mooney	5 – Gibbs	Edmund P. Joyce Center (8,709); South Bend, IN
January 22, 2019; 7:00 pm, ACCRSN		at Georgia Tech	L 61–63	11–8 (1–5)	22 – Mooney	14 – Mooney	5 – Tied	McCamish Pavilion (5,861); Atlanta, GA
January 26, 2019; 1:00 pm, CBS		No. 3 Virginia	L 55–82	11–9 (1–6)	15 – Mooney	10 – Mooney	5 – Hubb	Edmund P. Joyce Center (9,149); South Bend, IN
January 28, 2019; 7:00 pm, ESPN		No. 2 Duke	L 61–83	11–10 (1–7)	14 – Mooney	11 – Mooney	4 – Hubb	Edmund P. Joyce Center (9,149); South Bend, IN
February 2, 2019; 2:00 pm, ACCRSN		at Boston College	W 79–73	12–10 (2–7)	21 – Djogo	13 – Mooney	5 – Hubb	Conte Forum (8,606); Chestnut Hill, MA
February 6, 2019; 7:00 pm, ESPN2		at Miami (FL)	L 47–62	12–11 (2–8)	14 – Harvey	7 – Djogo	2 – 3 tied	Watsco Center (6,372); Coral Gables, FL8
February 10, 2019; 6:00 pm, ESPNU		Georgia Tech	W 69–59	13–11 (3–8)	20 – Gibbs	14 – Mooney	5 – Gibbs	Edmund P. Joyce Center (8,438); South Bend, IN
February 16, 2019; 2:00 pm, Raycom		at No. 4 Virginia	L 54–60	13–12 (3–9)	17 – Gibbs	15 – Mooney	3 – Gibbs	John Paul Jones Arena (13,448); Charlottesville, VA
February 19, 2019; 7:00 pm, ESPNU		Wake Forest	L 68–75	13–13 (3–10)	23 – Gibbs	9 – Mooney	9 – Hubb	Edmund P. Joyce Center (8,286); South Bend, IN
February 23, 2019; 4:00 pm, ESPN		No. 20 Virginia Tech	L 59–67	13–14 (3–11)	18 – Gibbs	10 – Mooney	7 – Hubb	Edmund P. Joyce Center (8,784); South Bend, IN
February 25, 2019; 7:00 pm, ESPN		at No. 18 Florida State	L 61–68	13–15 (3–12)	18 – Harvey	8 – Mooney	5 – Gibbs	Donald L. Tucker Center (9,519); Tallahassee, FL
March 3, 2019; 1:30 pm, CBS		at Louisville	L 61–75	13–16 (3–13)	22 – Mooney	13 – Mooney	6 – Hubb	KFC Yum! Center (16,911); Louisville, KY
March 6, 2019; 9:00 pm, ESPNU		Clemson	L 62–64	13–17 (3–14)	18 – Mooney	20 – Mooney	5 – Mooney	Edmund P. Joyce Center (8,158); South Bend, IN
March 9, 2019; 12:00 pm, Raycom		at Pittsburgh	L 53–56	13–18 (3–15)	23 – Laszewski	13 – Mooney	7 – Hubb	Petersen Events Center (8,602); Pittsburgh, PA
ACC tournament
March 12, 2019; 2:00 pm, ESPN	(15)	vs. (10) Georgia Tech; First Round	W 78–71	14–18	20 – Mooney	10 – Mooney	6 – Hubb	Spectrum Center; Charlotte, NC
March 13, 2019; 7:00 pm, ESPN2	(15)	vs. (7) Louisville; Second Round	L 53–75	14–19	21 – Gibbs	12 – Mooney	2 – Gibbs	Spectrum Center (11,884); Charlotte, NC
*Non-conference game. ^{#}Rankings from AP Poll. (#) Tournament seedings in parentheses. All times are in Eastern Time.

== Rankings ==
Ranking movements Legend: RV = Received votes
	Week																			
Poll	Pre	1	2	3	4	5	6	7	8	9	10	11	12	13	14	15	16	17	18	Final
AP	RV	RV																		Not released
Coaches	RV																			

*AP does not release post-NCAA Tournament rankings
