= 2000–01 Notre Dame Fighting Irish men's basketball team =

American college basketball season

2000–01 Notre Dame Fighting Irish men's basketball

NCAA tournament, second round vs Ole Miss 56-59
- Conference: Big East Conference

Ranking
- Coaches: No. 23
- AP: No. 19
- Record: 20–10 (11–5 Big East)
- Head coach: Mike Brey (1st season)
- Home arena: Joyce Center

2000–01 Big East men's basketball standings
	Conf.				Overall
Team	W		L	PCT	W		L	PCT
East
No. 7 Boston College †	13	–	3	.813	27	–	5	.844
Providence	11	–	5	.688	21	–	10	.677
St. John's#	8	–	8	.500	5	–	15	.250
Miami	8	–	8	.500	16	–	13	.552
Villanova	8	–	8	.500	18	–	13	.581
Connecticut	8	–	8	.500	20	–	12	.625
Virginia Tech*	2	–	14	.125	8	–	19	.296
West
No. 19 Notre Dame	11	–	5	.688	20	–	10	.667
No. 21 Georgetown	10	–	6	.625	25	–	8	.758
No. 17 Syracuse	10	–	6	.625	25	–	9	.735
West Virginia	8	–	8	.500	17	–	12	.586
Pittsburgh	7	–	9	.438	19	–	14	.576
Seton Hall	5	–	11	.313	16	–	15	.516
Rutgers*	3	–	13	.188	11	–	16	.407
† 2001 Big East tournament winner As of April 2, 2001; Rankings from AP Poll #St. John's had 9 regular-season games vacated due to sanctions against the program; the school′s disputed record was 8–8, 14–15. *Did not qualify for 2001 Big East tournament.

The 2000–01 Notre Dame Fighting Irish men's basketball team represented the University of Notre Dame during the 2000–01 NCAA Division I men's basketball season. They finished the regular season with a record of 20–10, 11–5. There, they defeated Xavier to advance to the Second Round. In the Second Round, they lost to the #3 seed Ole Miss, 59–56. This was Mike Brey's first year at Notre Dame.

Forward Troy Murphy was the team's captain and leading scorer, averaging 21.8 points per game.

== Schedule ==
Date time, TV	Rank^{#}	Opponent^{#}	Result	Record	Site city, state
November 18*		Sacred Heart	W 104–58	1–0	Joyce Center; South Bend, Indiana
November 22*		Loyola (IL)	W 107–68	2–0	Joyce Center; South Bend, Indiana
November 25*	No. 14	No. 16 Cincinnati	W 69–51	3–0	Joyce Center; South Bend, Indiana
December 2*		at Vanderbilt	W 77–74	4–0	Memorial Gymnasium; Nashville, Tennessee
December 5*		Indiana	L 78–86	4–1	Joyce Center; South Bend, Indiana
December 9*		Miami (OH)	L 64–73	4–2	Joyce Center; South Bend, Indiana
December 17*		Tennessee Tech	W 82–68	5–2	Joyce Center; South Bend, Indiana
December 19*		Canisius	W 99–71	6–2	Joyce Center; South Bend, Indiana
December 21*		Vermont	W 96–86	7–2	Joyce Center; South Bend, Indiana
December 29*		Long Island University	W 97–49	8–2	Joyce Center; South Bend, Indiana
January 2		at Syracuse	L 70–79	8–3 (0–1)	Carrier Dome; Syracuse, New York
January 6		Rutgers	W 87–80	9–3 (1–1)	Joyce Center; South Bend, Indiana
January 8		at Seton Hall	L 76–78	9–4 (1–2)	Continental Airlines Arena; East Rutherford, NJ
January 13*		at Kentucky	L 71–82	9–5 (1–2)	Rupp Arena; Lexington, Kentucky
January 16		Pittsburgh	W 74–58	10–5 (2–2)	Joyce Center; South Bend, Indiana
January 21		West Virginia	W 78–61	11–5 (3–2)	Joyce Center; South Bend, Indiana
January 23		Syracuse	W 74–60	12–5 (4–2)	Joyce Center; South Bend, Indiana
January 27		at Georgetown	W 78–71	13–5 (5–2)	MCI Center; Washington, D.C.
February 3		at Pittsburgh	W 75–67	14–5 (6–2)	Fitzgerald Fieldhouse; Pittsburgh, Pennsylvania
February 5		St. John’s	W 83–73	15–5 (7–2)	Joyce Center; South Bend, Indiana
February 11		at West Virginia	W 69–66	16–5 (8–2)	WVU Coliseum; Morgantown, WV
February 14		at Rutgers	W 81–59	17–5 (9–2)	Louis Brown Athletic Center; Piscataway, NJ
February 18		Seton Hall	L 64–74	17–6 (9–3)	Joyce Center; South Bend, Indiana
February 21		Boston College	W 76–75	18–6 (10–3)	Joyce Center; South Bend, Indiana
February 24		at Virginia Tech	W 85–61	19–6 (11–3)	Cassell Coliseum; Blacksburg, Virginia
February 26		at Connecticut	L 50–75	19–7 (11–4)	Harry A. Gampel Pavilion; Storrs, Connecticut
March 4		Georgetown	L 72–79	19–8 (11–5)	Joyce Center; South Bend, Indiana
Big East tournament
March 8		vs. Pittsburgh; Quarterfinals	L 54–66	19–9 (11–6)	Madison Square Garden (IV); New York, New York
NCAA tournament
March 16*; CBS		vs. Xavier; First Round	W 83–71	20–9 (11–6)	Kemper Arena; Kansas City, Missouri
March 18*; CBS		vs. Ole Miss; Second Round	L 56–59	20–10 (11–6)	Kemper Arena; Kansas City, Missouri
*Non-conference game. ^{#}Rankings from AP Poll. (#) Tournament seedings in parentheses.

== Players selected in NBA drafts ==
Year	Round	Pick	Player	NBA club
2001	1	14	Troy Murphy	Golden State Warriors
