= Collis Jones =

American basketball player

Personal information
- Born: July 3, 1949 (age 77) Washington, D.C., U.S.
- Listed height: 6 ft 7 in (2.01 m)
- Listed weight: 203 lb (92 kg)

Career information
- High school: St. John's College HS (Washington, D.C.)
- College: Notre Dame (1968–1971)
- NBA draft: 1971: 1st round, 17th overall pick
- Drafted by: Milwaukee Bucks
- Playing career: 1971–1975
- Position: Small forward / power forward
- Number: 43, 42, 22, 13

Career history
- 1971–1973: Dallas Chaparrals
- 1973–1974: Kentucky Colonels
- 1974–1975: Memphis Sounds
- Stats at Basketball Reference

J. Collis Jones (born July 3, 1949) is an American former college and professional basketball player. Born in Washington, D.C., he attended the University of Notre Dame, where he scored 1,367 points for an average of 16.1 points per game. He led the 1969–70 and 1970–71 squads in rebounding with averages of 12.4 and 13.1 rebounds per game, respectively. He was selected in the first round of the 1971 NBA draft by the Milwaukee Bucks and also in the 1971 American Basketball Association (ABA) player draft by the Dallas Chaparrals. He played exclusively in the ABA, including for the Kentucky Colonels and Memphis Sounds.
