= Nate Laszewski =

American basketball player (born 1999)

No. 11 – Tokyo Hachioji Bee Trains
- Position: Power forward / center
- League: B.League

Personal information
- Born: July 19, 1999 (age 27) Jupiter, Florida, U.S.
- Listed height: 6 ft 10 in (2.08 m)
- Listed weight: 230 lb (104 kg)

Career information
- High school: Avon (Avon, Connecticut); Northfield Mount Hermon (Gill, Massachusetts)
- College: Notre Dame (2018–2023)
- NBA draft: 2023: undrafted
- Playing career: 2023–present

Career history
- 2023–2024: New Basket Brindisi
- 2024–2025: Aris Thessaloniki
- 2025: Hsinchu Toplus Lioneers
- 2025–2026: Maccabi Ra'anana
- 2026–present: Tokyo Hachioji Bee Trains

Nathan James Laszewski (born July 19, 1999) is an American professional basketball player for the Tokyo Hachioji Bee Trains of the Japanese B.League. He played college basketball for the Notre Dame Fighting Irish.

== High school career ==
Laszewski played basketball for Avon High School in Avon, Connecticut, where he earned First Team All-State honors. He transferred to Northfield Mount Hermon School in Gill, Massachusetts. As a sophomore, Laszewski led his team to the New England Preparatory School Athletic Council (NEPSAC) Class AAA title and was named MVP. In his final season, Laszewski helped his team to a school-record 31 wins and another Class AAA title, where he won MVP. He averaged 19.6 points, 6.8 rebounds, and 1.9 assists per game per game, and set program records for single-season points and three-pointers, as well as career three-pointers. A consensus four-star recruit, he committed to play college basketball for Notre Dame over offers from Arizona, North Carolina, Wake Forest and Wisconsin.

== College career ==
As a freshman at Notre Dame, Laszewski averaged 6.9 points and 3.9 rebounds per game. In his sophomore season, he averaged 7.4 points and 4.6 rebounds per game. On December 30, 2020, Laszewski posted a career-high 28 points and six rebounds in a 66–57 loss to Virginia. As a junior, he averaged 13.3 points and 7.3 rebounds per game, earning All-Atlantic Coast Conference (ACC) honorable mention.

== Career statistics ==
Legend
GP	Games played	GS	Games started	MPG	Minutes per game
FG%	Field goal percentage	3P%	3-point field goal percentage	FT%	Free throw percentage
RPG	Rebounds per game	APG	Assists per game	SPG	Steals per game
BPG	Blocks per game	PPG	Points per game	**Bold**	Career high

=== College ===
Year	Team	GP	GS	MPG	FG%	3P%	FT%	RPG	APG	SPG	BPG	PPG
2018–19	Notre Dame	33	7	19.0	.392	.338	.720	3.9	.2	.2	.4	6.9
2019–20	Notre Dame	32	1	21.0	.410	.310	.731	4.6	.5	.2	.3	7.4
2020–21	Notre Dame	26	25	31.3	**.589**	.434	.710	**7.3**	.8	**.5**	.6	13.3
2021–22	Notre Dame	**34**	25	28.8	.514	**.456**	**.851**	6.5	.8	**.5**	.5	9.3
2022–23	Notre Dame	32	**32**	**34.0**	.509	.392	.847	7.2	**1.3**	.4	**.7**	**13.7**
Career		157	90	26.6	.487	.382	.775	5.8	.7	.4	.5	10.0

== Professional career ==
On July 22, 2023, he signed with New Basket Brindisi of the Italian Lega Basket Serie A.

On June 25, 2024, Laszewski signed with Greek club Aris. On February 22, 2025, Laszewski was released by Aris and replaced with Shakur Juiston.

On February 28, 2025, Laszewski signed with the Hsinchu Toplus Lioneers of the Taiwan Professional Basketball League (TPBL). On August 24, Laszewski signed with the Maccabi Ra'anana of the Israeli Basketball Premier League.

== Personal life ==
Laszewski's father, Jay, and his older sister, Abby, played college basketball at Wisconsin. His younger sister, Emma, plays college basketball for Brown. He and his family lived in Belgium and Australia for parts of his childhood.
