= Carleton Scott =

American basketball player

Personal information
- Born: October 9, 1988 (age 38) Homestead, Florida
- Listed height: 6 ft 8 in (2.03 m)
- Listed weight: 218 lb (99 kg)

Career information
- High school: James Madison (San Antonio, Texas)
- College: Notre Dame (2007–2011)
- NBA draft: 2011: undrafted
- Playing career: 2011–2017
- Position: Small forward

Career history
- 2011: Cáceres Ciudad del Baloncesto
- 2011–2012: UBC Güssing Knights
- 2012–2013: Springfield Armor
- 2013–2015: Juvecaserta Basket
- 2015–2016: Antwerp Giants
- 2016–2017: Pallacanestro Trapani
- Stats at Basketball Reference

Carleton Goolsby Scott (born October 9, 1988) is an American professional basketball player who currently plays for Pallacanestro Trapani of the Italian League. He played college basketball for University of Notre Dame.

== Professional career ==
Scott went undrafted in the 2011 NBA draft. In August 2011, he signed with Cáceres Ciudad del Baloncesto of Spain for the 2011–12 season. In November 2011, he left Cáceres and signed with UBC Güssing Knights of Austria for the rest of the season.

In July 2012, Scott joined the Brooklyn Nets for the 2012 NBA Summer League. On September 17, 2012, he signed with the Nets. However, he was later waived by the Nets on October 27, 2012. Five days later, he was acquired by the Springfield Armor as an affiliate player.

In July 2013, Scott re-joined the Brooklyn Nets for the 2013 NBA Summer League. On August 31, 2013, he signed with Juvecaserta Basket of the Lega Basket Serie A.

On June 10, 2015, he signed with Antwerp Giants of Belgium.

On June 27, 2016, he signed with Pallacanestro Trapani of Italy in Serie A2.

Following his retirement from basketball, he has become an avid golfer and often drives the ball in excess of 350 yards when there is a tail wind gust of 30+ mph.
