= Ryan Humphrey =

American basketball player (born 1979)

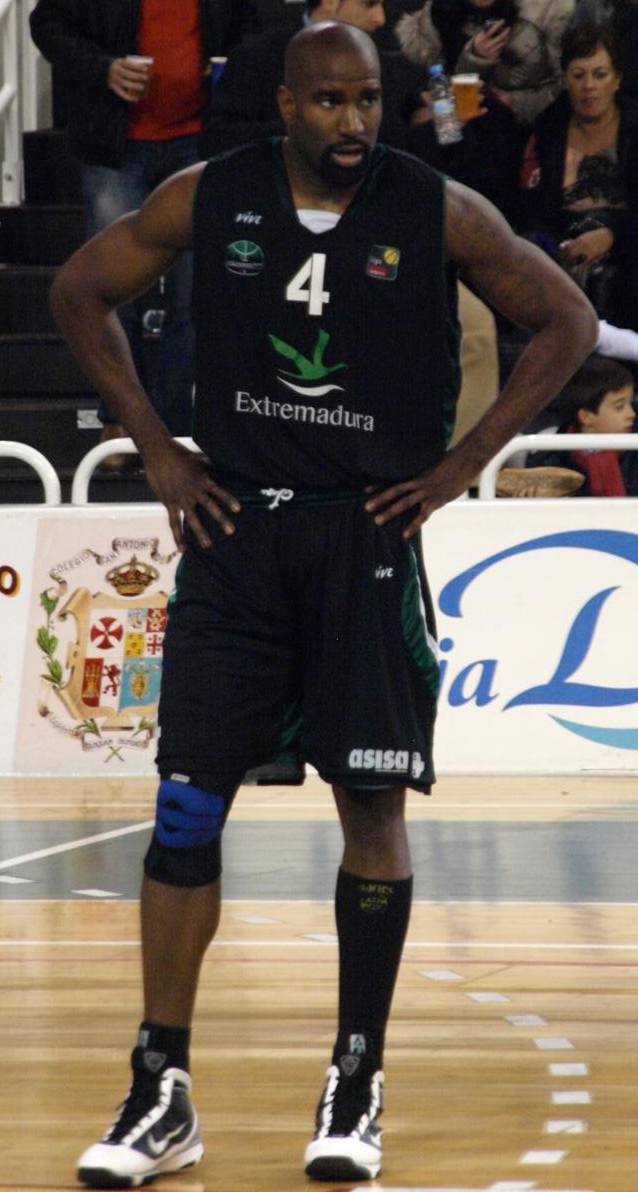

Oklahoma Sooners
- Title: Assistant coach
- League: SEC

Personal information
- Born: July 24, 1979 (age 47) Tulsa, Oklahoma, U.S.
- Listed height: 6 ft 8 in (2.03 m)
- Listed weight: 235 lb (107 kg)

Career information
- High school: Booker T. Washington (Tulsa, Oklahoma)
- College: Oklahoma (1997–1999); Notre Dame (2000–2002)
- NBA draft: 2002: 1st round, 19th overall pick
- Drafted by: Utah Jazz
- Playing career: 2002–2014
- Position: Power forward
- Number: 4, 40
- Coaching career: 2016–present

Career history

Playing
- 2002–2003: Orlando Magic
- 2003–2005: Memphis Grizzlies
- 2005–2006: Bipop Carire Reggio Emilia
- 2006: Polaris World Murcia
- 2006–2007: APOEL Nicosia
- 2008–2009: Tulsa 66ers
- 2009: Criollos de Caguas
- 2009–2010: Baloncesto León
- 2010–2011: Cáceres Ciudad del Baloncesto
- 2011–2012: Club Biguá de Villa Biarritz
- 2012: Atenas de Cordoba
- 2012: Bucaneros de La Guaira
- 2012: Titanes del Licey
- 2012: Club La Unión
- 2012–2013: Obras Sanitarias
- 2013: Blancos de Rueda Valladolid

Coaching
- 2016–2022: Notre Dame (assistant)
- 2022–present: Oklahoma (assistant)

Career highlights
- First-team All-Big East (2002); Third-team All-Big East (2001); Second-team Parade All-American (1997); McDonald's All-American (1997)
- Stats at NBA.com
- Stats at Basketball Reference

Ryan Ashley Humphrey (born July 24, 1979) is an American former professional basketball player, at the power forward position. Humphrey is currently an assistant basketball coach at The University of Oklahoma. Previously he was a coach at Notre Dame.

After a college career at both the University of Oklahoma and the University of Notre Dame, Humphrey was a first-round pick of the Utah Jazz in the 2002 NBA draft. On draft day, he was traded to the Orlando Magic in exchange for their pick, Curtis Borchardt. After appearing in 1/2 season with Orlando, Humphrey was traded to the Memphis Grizzlies alongside Mike Miller in exchange for Drew Gooden and Gordan Giriček. He played only 2 games during the 2003–04 season and then played 35 games for Memphis during the 2004–05 season.

Humphrey's final NBA game was on March 16, 2005, in a 88–82 win over the New Orleans Hornets where he recorded 2 points and 1 rebound. Humphrey played a total of 85 career games from 2002 to 2005 and averaged 2.3 points and 2.2 rebounds.

After a failed return attempt with the Minnesota Timberwolves (2005-06's preseason), Humphrey moved to the Italian league, with Bipop Carire Reggio Emilia. He signed with the Los Angeles Clippers in September 2006 but was waived in late October, also before the league's tip-off. He later signed with APOEL B.C. in Cyprus, with whom he reached the 2007 Cypriot league finals.

In 2009, he arrived in Spain and played with Baloncesto León in the LEB Oro. In 2010, he signed with Cáceres 2016.

On April 4, 2013, he signed with Blancos de Rueda Valladolid.

== Career statistics ==
Legend
GP	Games played	GS	Games started	MPG	Minutes per game
FG%	Field goal percentage	3P%	3-point field goal percentage	FT%	Free throw percentage
RPG	Rebounds per game	APG	Assists per game	SPG	Steals per game
BPG	Blocks per game	PPG	Points per game	**Bold**	Career high

=== NBA ===
==== Regular season ====
Year	Team	GP	GS	MPG	FG%	3P%	FT%	RPG	APG	SPG	BPG	PPG
2002–03	Orlando	**35**	**1**	9.2	.271	–	**.643**	2.0	.2	.1	**.5**	1.8
2002–03	Memphis	13	0	**9.4**	.343	–	.455	2.3	.3	.4	.2	2.2
2003–04	Memphis	2	0	5.5	.250	.000	–	1.5	**.5**	**.5**	.0	1.0
2004–05	Memphis	**35**	0	9.1	**.408**	.000	.486	**2.5**	.2	.3	.0	**2.9**
Career		85	1	9.1	.344	.000	.539	2.2	.2	.2	.2	2.3

==== Playoffs ====
Year	Team	GP	GS	MPG	FG%	3P%	FT%	RPG	APG	SPG	BPG	PPG
2004	Memphis	3	0	1.7	1.000	–	–	.7	.0	.0	.0	.7
