= Dirigo High School =

- Entrance of Dirigo High School.

Location
- 145 Weld Street; Dixfield, Maine 04224; United States
- 44°32′25″N 70°27′09″W

Information
- School type: Public
- Motto: Scienta Est Lux
- School district: RSU 56
- Superintendent: Pamela Doyen
- School code: 200305
- Principal: Kaelyne Thompson
- Teaching staff: 17.20 (FTE)
- Grades: 9–12
- Student to teacher ratio: 12.56
- Colors: Blue; White
- Athletics conference: Mountain Valley Conference
- Sports: Football, Soccer, Field Hockey, Cross-Country, Basketball, Cheering, Skiing, Wrestling, Tennis, Track, Baseball, & Softball.
- Mascot: Cougar
- Team name: Cougars
- Yearbook: Dimensions
- Website: www.rsu56.org/o/dirigo-hs

Dirigo High School is a high school located in Dixfield, Maine, in the United States as part of Maine Regional School Unit 56. Dirigo High School serves the towns of Dixfield, Canton, Carthage and Peru. It is classified as a secondary class C school. The school is in the Mountain Valley Athletic Conference or MVC.

Dirigo High School was built in 1948, as Dixfield High School. The second floor was added in 1951, the gym was added in 1967 and the science wing was added in 1974. The building was renovated and expanded in 1998.

== Girls' basketball ==
The Dirigo Lady Cougars' basketball team has had over a decade of success. Since 1995, the Lady Cougars had 11 straight Mountain Valley Conference (MVC) titles for a total of 12, 11 straight Western Maine titles for a total of 14, and 6 out of 13 State Championships. Dirigo has been a dominant high school basketball team in the past decade. The Lady Cougars rely on a great defense, and love to trap opposing teams and run a fast-break offense. The Lady Cougars have been gifted with several players to make the 1,000-point club.

- 1995-MVC Champs, Western Maine Champs, State Runners-up
- 1996-MVC Champs, Western Maine Champs, State Champs
- 1997-MVC Champs, Western Maine Champs, State Runners-up
- 1998-MVC Champs, Western Maine Champs, State Champs
- 1999-MVC Champs, Western Maine Champs, State Runners-up
- 2000-MVC Champs, Western Maine Champs, State Champs
- 2001-MVC Champs, Western Maine Champs, State Runners-u
- 2002-MVC Champs, Western Maine Champs, State Champs
- 2003-MVC Champs, Western Maine Champs, State Champs
- 2004-MVC Champs, Western Maine Champs, State Runners-up
- 2005-MVC Champs, Western Maine Champs, State Champs
- 2006-MVC Champs, Western Maine Runners-Up
- 2005- Western Maine Champs
- 2000- Western Maine Champs
- 1985- Western Maine Champs, State Runners-up
- 1979- MVC Champs
- 1978- MVC Champs, Western Maine Champs, State Champs
- 1977- MVC Champs, Western Maine Champs, State Champs
- 1976- Western Maine Champions

== Cheering ==
Cheering is a winter sport. Dirigo has won an athletic award in 1998 and 2002. In 2007, DHS won regionals, and won a Western Maine Class C championship. In 2010, The cheerleading team won second place at the regional championship, and was named Runner-up.

== Soccer ==
The Dirigo high school soccer team has made it to the Maine state semifinals twice. In the past five years they have also made it to the Western Maine Finals, but they lost to Sacopee Valley 2-1. In 2007, they made it to the semi-final round with a record of 11-2-1 in the regular season and an overall record was 12-3-1. This team was the third team in Dirigo history to make it this far into the playoffs.

== Football ==
The Dirigo Football team won the Class C Maine state championship against Foxcroft Academy in 2009, with a record of 12-0.

Dirigo Football is currently being coached by Championship coach James Hersom.

== Boys' basketball ==
The Boys' Basketball Team has been to 5 straight consecutive Western Maine Championship Games 2006-2011, winning in the 2009, 2010, 2011 seasons. They won the MVC Conference game in both 2008 and 2009.

The Boys' Basketball team beat Lee Academy 74-67 to win the 2012 State Championship. This was their first State Championship since 1983 and their last until the 2021-2022 season as they defeated dexter 59-56

Boys' Basketball is currently being coached by Cody St. Germaine.

Dirigo won back to back State Championships in 2022 and 2023

== Field hockey ==
Dirigos' field hockey team in the 2009 season made it to states for the first time in five years and had to compete against the number one seed of North Yarmouth Academy. Dirigo took up the sixth seed of the conference and played NYU but lost to them 0-10. Over-all the 2009 field hockey team achieved many of their set winning goals. In 2015, Dirigo's field hockey team won the Mountain Valley Conference game against Oak Hill.

== History of Dirigo tennis, boys' & girls' ==
Girls' Coach-Art Chamberlin 1981–present

Boys' Coach- Bruce Thompson 1977–present

- Boys' Tennis MVC Champs 2006
- Boys' Tennis MVC Champs 2007
- Boys' Tennis MVS Champs 2008
- Mountain Valley Champs-1988 through 1990 + 1993 +1998 +2001 + 2003
- State Champs Class B 1983-1984
