= Anthony Solomon (basketball) =

American basketball player and coach

Biographical details
- Born: December 1, 1964 (age 60); Newport News, Virginia, U.S.

Playing career
- 1983–1987: Virginia
- Position(s): Point guard

Coaching career (HC unless noted)
- 1988–1989: Delaware (GA)
- 1989–1992: Bowling Green (assistant)
- 1992–1993: Manhattan (assistant)
- 1993–1994: Richmond (assistant)
- 1994–1998: Virginia (assistant)
- 1998–2000: Clemson (DBO)
- 2000–2003: Notre Dame (assistant)
- 2003–2007: St. Bonaventure
- 2007–2008: Dayton (assistant)
- 2008–2016: Notre Dame (assistant)
- 2016–2017: Georgetown (assistant)
- 2017–2021: Dayton (assoc. HC)
- 2021–2023: Notre Dame (assoc. HC)

Head coaching record
- Overall: 24–88 (.214)

Anthony Solomon (born December 1, 1964) is an American college basketball coach. He most recently was the associate head coach for the University of Notre Dame. He was the head coach for St. Bonaventure University in Allegany, New York from 2003 to 2007.

Solomon played college basketball for Virginia from 1983 to 1987, where he was a part of their 1984 Final Four team. Following his playing career, he entered coaching in 1988 as a graduate assistant at Delaware. After assistant coaching stints at several schools, he joined Mike Brey's first staff at Notre Dame in 2000.

In 2003, St. Bonaventure was reeling from an academic fraud scandal and resulting NCAA sanctions. In searching for a replacement for fired coach Jan van Breda Kolff, Solomon was hired based on his honest reputation and ideas for bringing the program back. While Solomon achieved the goal of restoring a clean program, his teams had a 24–88 record over his four seasons and he was fired after a 7–22 campaign in 2006–07.

Solomon landed as an assistant at Dayton the next season, then had a second stint at Notre Dame and a season as an assistant at Georgetown. In 2017 he was hired as associate head coach at Dayton under head coach Anthony Grant.
