= Mike Brey =

American basketball coach (born 1959)

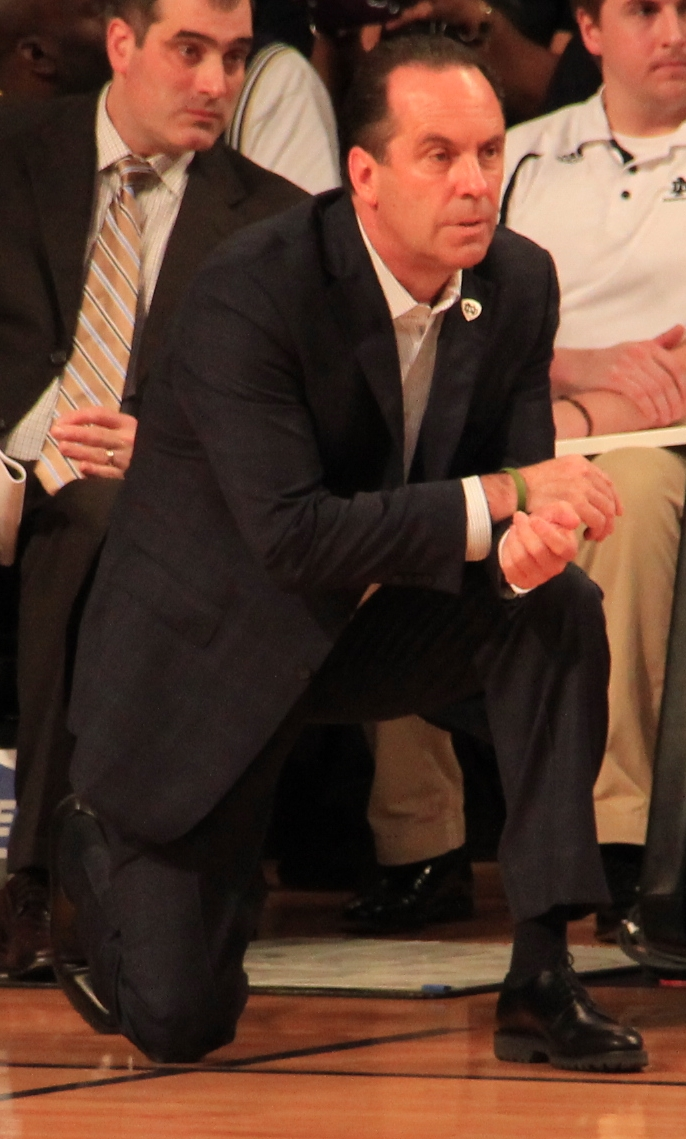
- Brey in 2014

Atlanta Hawks
- Title: Assistant coach
- League: NBA

Personal information
- Born: March 22, 1959 (age 67) Bethesda, Maryland, U.S.
- Listed height: 6 ft 0 in (1.83 m)

Career information
- High school: DeMatha Catholic (Hyattsville, Maryland)
- College: Northwestern State (1977–1980); George Washington (1981–1982)
- Position: Guard
- Coaching career: 1982–present

Career history

Coaching
- 1982–1987: DeMatha HS (assistant)
- 1987–1995: Duke (assistant)
- 1995–2000: Delaware
- 2000–2023: Notre Dame
- 2023–present: Atlanta Hawks (assistant)

Career highlights
- 2× America East regular season (1998, 1999); 2× America East tournament (1998, 1999); Big East West Division (2001); ACC tournament (2015); America East Coach of the Year (1998); 3× Big East Coach of the Year (2007, 2008, 2011); Jim Phelan National Coach of the Year Award (2012); Associated Press College Basketball Coach of the Year (2011); Skip Prosser Man of the Year Award (2008)

Michael Paul Brey (born March 22, 1959) is an American basketball coach who is an assistant coach for the Atlanta Hawks of the National Basketball Association (NBA). He previously served as head coach of the Delaware Fightin' Blue Hens from 1995 to 2000, and the Notre Dame Fighting Irish from 2000 to 2023.

== Early life and education ==
Brey, the son of Olympic swimmer Betty Brey, graduated from DeMatha Catholic High School in Hyattsville, Maryland in 1977. As a two-year letter winner under coach Morgan Wootten, Brey helped the team to a 55–9 mark. He enrolled at Northwestern State University, where he played varsity basketball for three years (1977–1980). He played one season at George Washington in 1981–82 after sitting out the 1980–81 season as a transfer. He served as team captain and was named most valuable player with 5.0 points and 4.8 assists per game for the Colonials. In 1982 Brey graduated from George Washington University with a bachelor's degree in physical education.

== Coaching career ==
Brey returned to his former high school, becoming an assistant coach under Morgan Wootten. In 1987, he was hired by Duke University to assist Mike Krzyzewski, and in 1995 he took over his first head coaching job at the University of Delaware. Brey guided the Fightin' Blue Hens to a 99–51 record over five years, leading the team to two America East Conference Championships and subsequently two trips to the NCAA Tournament. In 2000, Brey became the head coach at the University of Notre Dame.

=== Notre Dame Fighting Irish ===
In 2000, Brey succeeded Matt Doherty as head coach of the Notre Dame Fighting Irish men's basketball team. Notre Dame had not been to the NCAA tournament since 1990. Brey led the Irish to the NCAA tournament in his first three years as head coach (2001–2003), notching a Sweet Sixteen appearance in 2003. He has since led the team to tournament appearances in 2007, 2008, 2010, 2011, 2012, 2013, 2015, 2016, 2017 and 2021.

On December 29, 2017, Brey tied Digger Phelps for most wins by a Notre Dame coach with 393.

==== 2007–08 season ====
During the 2007–08 season, Brey led the Irish to a 24–6 regular-season mark. He was named the Big East Coach of the Year for the second consecutive season on March 11, 2008. Notre Dame had a 45-game home winning streak between February 2006 and February 2009 – the second-longest in school history. By completing the 2007–2008 regular season 18–0 at home, Brey coached the first team in Big East history to have consecutive undefeated seasons at home.

On June 19, 2012, Brey signed a 10-year extension to remain the head coach of the Notre Dame Irish up until 2022. The financials were not released.

==== 2014–15 season ====
During the 2014–15 season, Brey's Notre Dame team went 32–6 and won the ACC conference tournament. The squad advanced to the Elite Eight, losing a close game to Kentucky. The 32 wins were the most by a Notre Dame men's team since 1908–09. He also passed Hall of Famer George Keogan for second place on Notre Dame's all-time wins list, trailing only Digger Phelps.

==== 2015–16 season ====
Notre Dame advanced to the Elite Eight for the second consecutive season, defeating Michigan, Stephen F. Austin, and Wisconsin as the 6 seed in the East region. Notre Dame lost to North Carolina 88–74 in the Elite Eight.

==== 2016–17 season ====
During the 2016–17 regular season, Brey's team went 23–8. They finished the season in a three-way tie with Florida State and Louisville. The Irish were given a 3-seed in the ACC tournament which guaranteed them a double bye. Notre Dame dominated its first two games against Virginia and Florida State and sparked another ACC tournament final appearance for the second time in three years. The Irish went on to lose in the tournament final to Duke, 75–69. Notre Dame received a 5-seed in the West Region of the NCAA tournament, and defeated Princeton in the first round before falling to West Virginia in the second round.

==== Resignation from Notre Dame ====
With his 2022–23 team struggling to stay out of the basement of the ACC standings, on January 19, 2023, Brey announced that the 2022–23 season would be his last as head coach at Notre Dame, although he said that he was definitely not done coaching.

=== Atlanta Hawks ===
On June 15, 2023, Brey was hired as assistant coach for the Atlanta Hawks. He reunited with head coach Quin Snyder, who played his junior and senior seasons at Duke while Brey was an assistant under Mike Krzyzewski. The two then coached at Duke together during the 1994–1995 season.

== Head coaching record ==
Record table
Season	Team	Overall	Conference	Standing	Postseason
Delaware Fightin' Blue Hens (America East Conference) (1995–2000)
1995–96	Delaware	15–12	11–7	T–3rd	
1996–97	Delaware	15–16	8–10	5th	
1997–98	Delaware	20–10	12–6	T–1st	NCAA Division I Round of 64
1998–99	Delaware	25–6	15–3	T–1st	NCAA Division I Round of 64
1999–00	Delaware	24–8	14–4	3rd	NIT first round
Delaware:		99–52 (.656)	60–30 (.667)		
Notre Dame Fighting Irish (Big East Conference) (2000–2013)
2000–01	Notre Dame	20–10	11–5	1st (West)	NCAA Division I Round of 32
2001–02	Notre Dame	22–11	10–6	2nd (West)	NCAA Division I Round of 32
2002–03	Notre Dame	24–10	10–6	T–3rd (West)	NCAA Division I Sweet 16
2003–04	Notre Dame	19–13	9–7	7th	NIT quarterfinal
2004–05	Notre Dame	17–12	9–7	6th	NIT first round
2005–06	Notre Dame	16–14	6–10	T–11th	NIT second round
2006–07	Notre Dame	24–8	11–5	4th	NCAA Division I Round of 64
2007–08	Notre Dame	25–8	14–4	T–2nd	NCAA Division I Round of 32
2008–09	Notre Dame	21–15	8–10	T–9th	NIT semifinal
2009–10	Notre Dame	23–12	10–8	T–7th	NCAA Division I Round of 64
2010–11	Notre Dame	27–7	14–4	2nd	NCAA Division I Round of 32
2011–12	Notre Dame	22–12	13–5	3rd	NCAA Division I Round of 64
2012–13	Notre Dame	25–10	11–7	T–5th	NCAA Division I Round of 64
Notre Dame Fighting Irish (Atlantic Coast Conference) (2013–2023)
2013–14	Notre Dame	15–17	6–12	T–12th	
2014–15	Notre Dame	32–6	14–4	3rd	NCAA Division I Elite Eight
2015–16	Notre Dame	24–12	11–7	T–5th	NCAA Division I Elite Eight
2016–17	Notre Dame	26–10	12–6	T–2nd	NCAA Division I Round of 32
2017–18	Notre Dame	21–15	8–10	T–10th	NIT second round
2018–19	Notre Dame	14–19	3–15	T–14th	
2019–20	Notre Dame	20–12	10–10	T–6th	N/A (COVID)
2020–21	Notre Dame	11–15	7–11	11th	
2021–22	Notre Dame	24–11	15–5	T–2nd	NCAA Division I Round of 32
2022–23	Notre Dame	11–21	3–17	14th	
Notre Dame:		483–280 (.633)	225–181 (.554)		
Total:		582–332 (.637)			
National champion Postseason invitational champion Conference regular season champion Conference regular season and conference tournament champion Division regular season champion Division regular season and conference tournament champion Conference tournament champion
