= Garrick Sherman =

American basketball player

Free agent
- Position: Center

Personal information
- Born: August 18, 1990 (age 36) Kenton, Ohio
- Listed height: 6 ft 11 in (2.11 m)
- Listed weight: 255 lb (116 kg)

Career information
- High school: Kenton (Kenton, Ohio)
- College: Michigan State (2009–2011); Notre Dame (2012–2014)
- NBA draft: 2014: undrafted
- Playing career: 2014–present

Career history
- 2014: AZS Koszalin
- 2015: Dinamo Tbilisi
- 2015: Donar Groningen
- 2015–2016: Jászberényi KSE

Garrick Sherman (born August 18, 1990) is an American basketball player. Sherman plays as center or power forward.

== College career ==
Sherman started his collegiate career with Michigan State Spartans men's basketball in 2009. He didn't play in the 2011–12 season, and transferred to Notre Dame Fighting Irish men's basketball after the season he sat out.

== Professional career ==
On July 30, 2014, Sherman signed with AZS Koszalin in Poland. On January 29, 2015, he was released by the team.

On February 5, 2015, he signed with BC Dinamo Tbilisi in Georgia and finished the 2014–15 season here. He averaged 16.3 points and 8.1 rebounds in 16 games for Dinamo.

In May 2015, he signed a 1-year deal with Donar Groningen in the Netherlands. Sherman and Donar parted ways on November 23, 2015. He immediately signed with Jászberényi KSE in Hungary.

== Statistics ==
Season	Team	League	PPG	RPG	APG	EFF
2014–15	AZS Koszalin	PLK	6.8	3.4	0.1	4.8
2014–15	Dinamo Tbilisi	Superliga	20.4	12.4	1.0	23.1
2015–16	Donar	DBL	7.0	5.0	0.6	9.0

League leader
