= Eric Atkins =

American professional basketball player

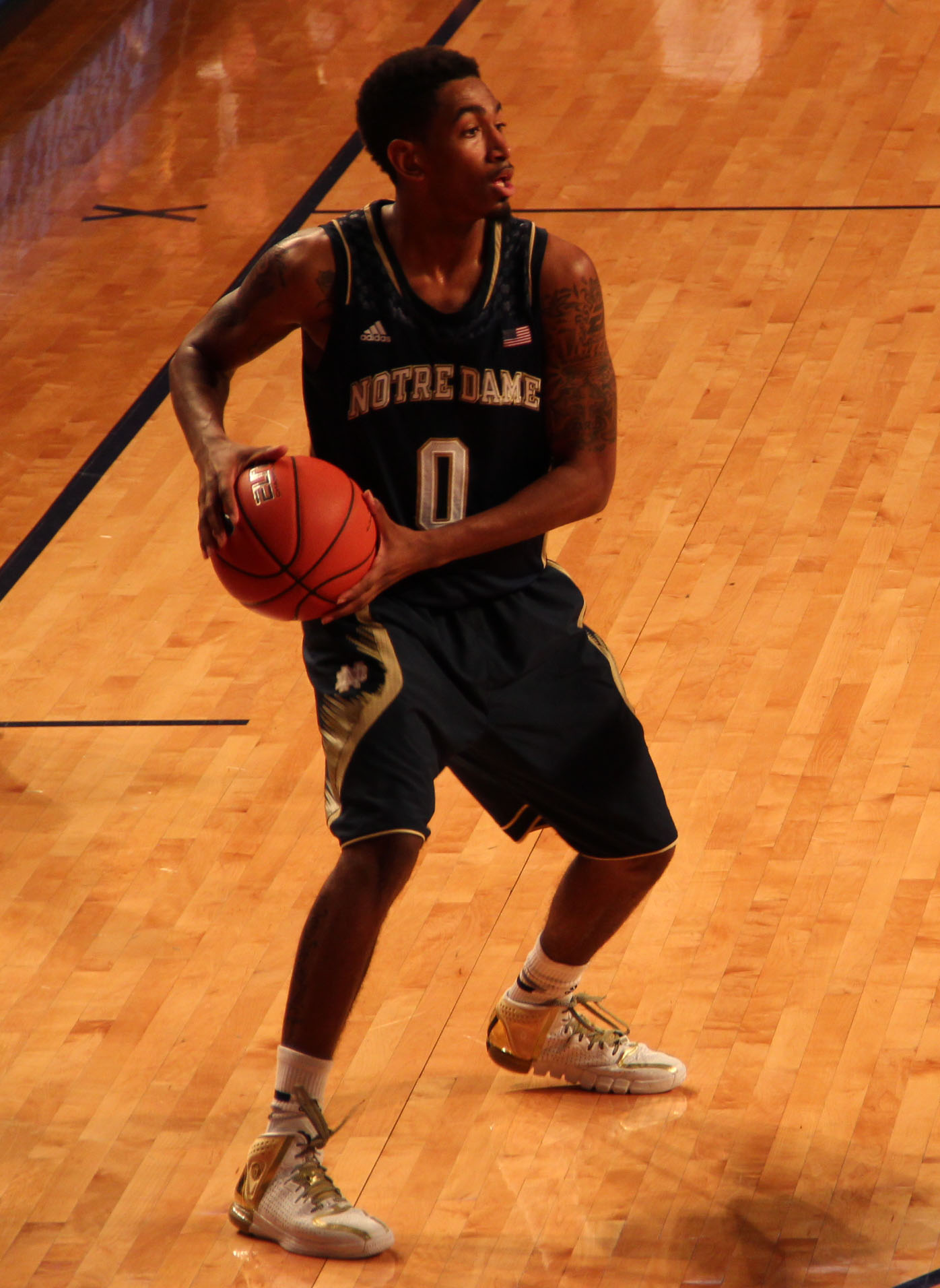
- Atkins playing for Notre Dame in 2014

Towson Tigers
- Title: Assistant coach
- League: Coastal Athletic Association

Personal information
- Born: December 14, 1991 (age 34) Greenwich, Connecticut, U.S.
- Listed height: 6 ft 2 in (1.88 m)
- Listed weight: 180 lb (82 kg)

Career information
- High school: Mount Saint Joseph (Baltimore, Maryland)
- College: Notre Dame (2010–2014)
- NBA draft: 2014: undrafted
- Playing career: 2014–2016
- Position: Point guard
- Number: 4, 9
- Coaching career: 2019–present

Career history

Playing
- 2014–2015: KAOD
- 2016: Erie BayHawks

Coaching
- 2016–2019: Notre Dame (video coordinator)
- 2019–2020: Howard (men's asst.)
- 2021–2022: George Washington (men's asst.)
- 2022–2024: Wisconsin Herd (asst.)
- 2024–present: Towson (women's asst.)

Career highlights
- Third-team All-ACC – Coaches (2014)
- Stats at Basketball Reference

Eric William Atkins (born December 14, 1991) is an American professional basketball coach and former player currently working as an assistant coach for the Towson Tigers women's basketball team. He played college basketball for Notre Dame where he served as a video coordinator after his playing career, later working as an assistant at Howard.

He played professionally in Greece and last played for the Erie BayHawks of the NBA Development League.

== High school career ==
Atkins attended Mount Saint Joseph where as a four-year starter, he helped lead his teams to a combined record of 106–30 throughout his career, earning several awards in the process, including the Baltimore Catholic League MVP twice, being named to the BCL all-conference team three times and being named to the All-Baltimore Metro squad three consecutive years by the Baltimore Sun. As a senior, he averaged 15.0 points, 4.0 assists, 4.0 rebounds and 2.0 steals while leading the team to a 28–3 record and the BCL regular season crown (the second while he was at Mount Saint Joseph).

== College career ==
After graduating, Atkins joined Notre Dame where he played in 133 contests, starting 105 while averaging 10.7 points and 4.4 assists, finishing his career 18th in school history in scoring list and third in assists. As a senior, he averaged 13.9 points, 2.8 rebounds and 4.9 assists in 37.8 minutes.

== Professional career ==
On August 6, 2014, Atkins signed with Greek team KAOD for the 2014–15 season. In 26 games for KAOD, he averaged 7.0 points, 2.2 rebounds and 2.9 assists in 23.4 minutes of action.

On July 27, 2015, Atkins moved to Hungary, signing with Falco KC Szombathely. He averaged 14 points and five assists per game during preseason, but the team's head coach determined that was not enough, expecting Atkins to average 30 points per game, and released him prior to the start of the regular season.

On October 25, 2015, Atkins signed with the Utah Jazz, only to be waived by the team the following day. On November 1, he was acquired by the Idaho Stampede of the NBA Development League as an affiliate player of the Jazz. However, he was waived by Idaho on November 16 before appearing in a game for them. On January 27, 2016, he was acquired by the Erie BayHawks. Three days later, he made his debut with the BayHawks in a 100–83 win over Raptors 905, recording four points, four rebounds, six assists and one steal in 19 minutes.

== Coaching career ==
Atkins was the video coordinator at Notre Dame, and joined Howard's coaching staff in 2019 where he worked with MEAC all-time leading scorer Charles Williams and Makur Maker. In 2021, he joined George Washington's staff. In November of 2022, he was named an assistant coach for the NBA G League's Wisconsin Herd. On July 11, 2024, he named an assistant coach for the Towson Tigers women's basketball team.

== Personal life ==
The son of Dominique and the late William L. Atkins, he has two older brothers, Bryan and Sean. Atkins was a participant in Notre Dame's Rosenthal Leadership Academy in 2012 and 2013 and graduated with a degree in film, television and theater.
