= Jack Cooley =

American basketball player (born 1991)

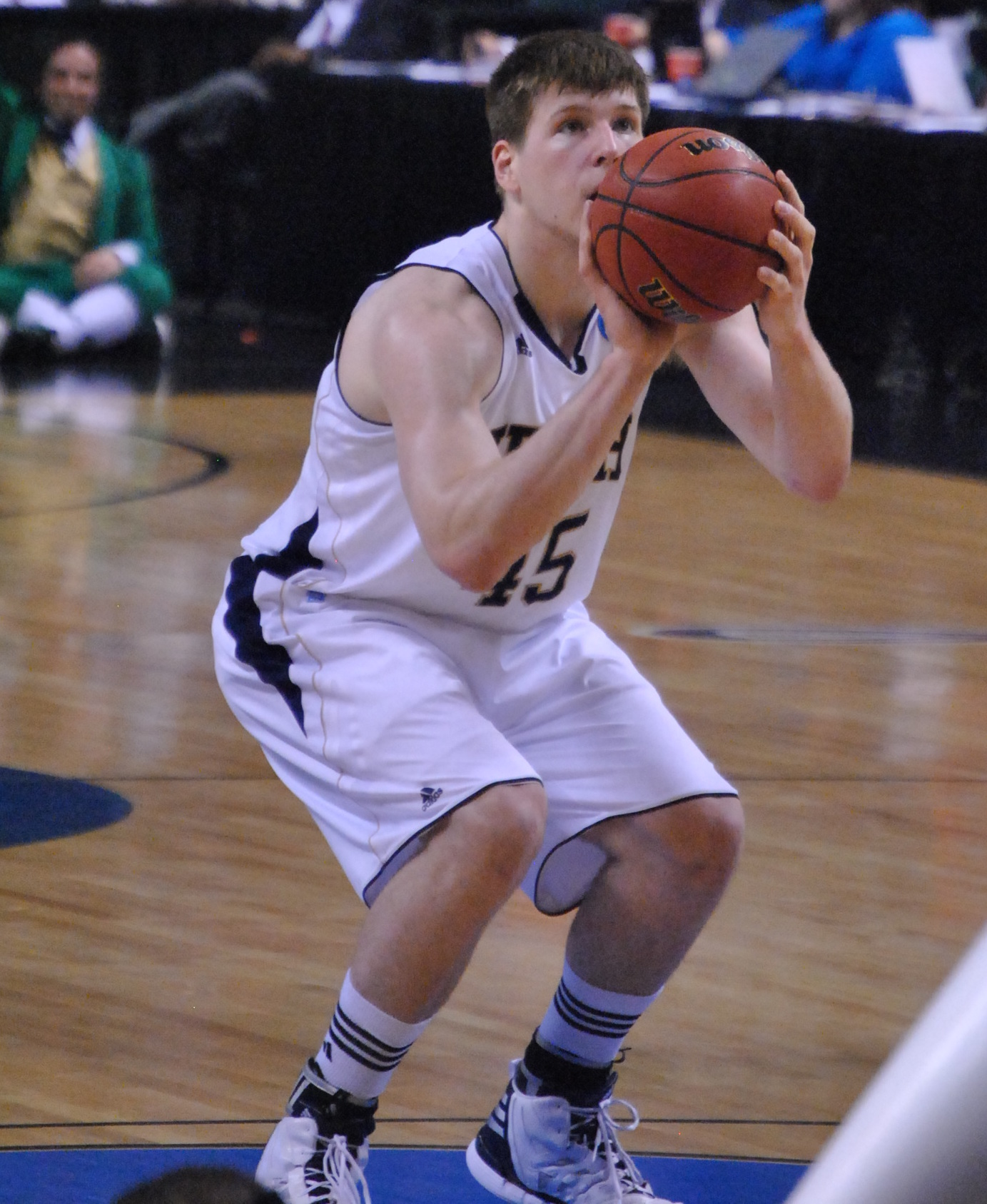
- Cooley playing for Notre Dame in 2012

No. 45 – Ryukyu Golden Kings
- Position: Power forward / center
- League: B.League

Personal information
- Born: April 12, 1991 (age 35) Evanston, Illinois, U.S.
- Listed height: 6 ft 9 in (2.06 m)
- Listed weight: 247 lb (112 kg)

Career information
- High school: Glenbrook South (Glenview, Illinois)
- College: Notre Dame (2009–2013)
- NBA draft: 2013: undrafted
- Playing career: 2013–present

Career history
- 2013–2014: Trabzonspor
- 2014–2015: Idaho Stampede
- 2015: Utah Jazz
- 2015: Idaho Stampede
- 2015–2016: Málaga
- 2016–2017: Riesen Ludwigsburg
- 2017–2018: Sacramento Kings
- 2017–2018: →Reno Bighorns
- 2018–2019: Dinamo Sassari
- 2019–present: Ryukyu Golden Kings

Career highlights
- FIBA Europe Cup champion (2019); First-team All-Big East (2013); Second-team All-Big East (2012); Big East Most Improved Player (2012)
- Stats at NBA.com
- Stats at Basketball Reference
Medals
Men's basketball
Representing the United States
FIBA AmeriCup
| Bronze medal – third place | 2025 Managua |

Jack Ryan Cooley (born April 12, 1991) is an American professional basketball player for Ryukyu Golden Kings of the Japanese B.League. He played college basketball for the Notre Dame Fighting Irish.

== High school career ==
Cooley was a three-year starter at Glenbrook South High School and averaged 20.7 points and 11.2 rebounds per game during his junior season. He averaged 20.5 points, 13.5 rebounds, and 4.5 blocks per game in his senior season, but missed the second half of the season due to a thumb injury. According to the ESPN recruiting database, Cooley was ranked as the #33 power forward in the class of 2009. On February 5, 2009, Cooley committed to the University of Notre Dame.

== College career ==
=== Freshman season ===
As a freshman at Notre Dame, Cooley appeared in twenty games, averaging 1.0 point and 1.8 rebounds per game.

=== Sophomore season ===
In his sophomore season, Cooley appeared in all thirty-four games for Notre Dame off the bench. He averaged 3.7 points and 3.1 rebounds per game.

=== Junior season ===
Cooley appeared in thirty-three games, making thirty-one starts in his junior season. He averaged 12.5 points and 8.9 rebounds per game, leading Notre Dame in both scoring and rebounding. He also recorded a team-best fifty-two blocks. Following the season, he won the Big East Most Improved Player award and was named to the all-Big East second team.

=== Senior season ===
Before his senior season, Cooley was named to the Naismith Award top fifty early-season watch list. He was also a preseason All-Big East first team selection. Cooley finished his senior season averaging career highs in both points and rebounding at 13.1 and 10.1 per game respectively. Additionally, Cooley was named to the All-Big East first team.

== Professional career ==
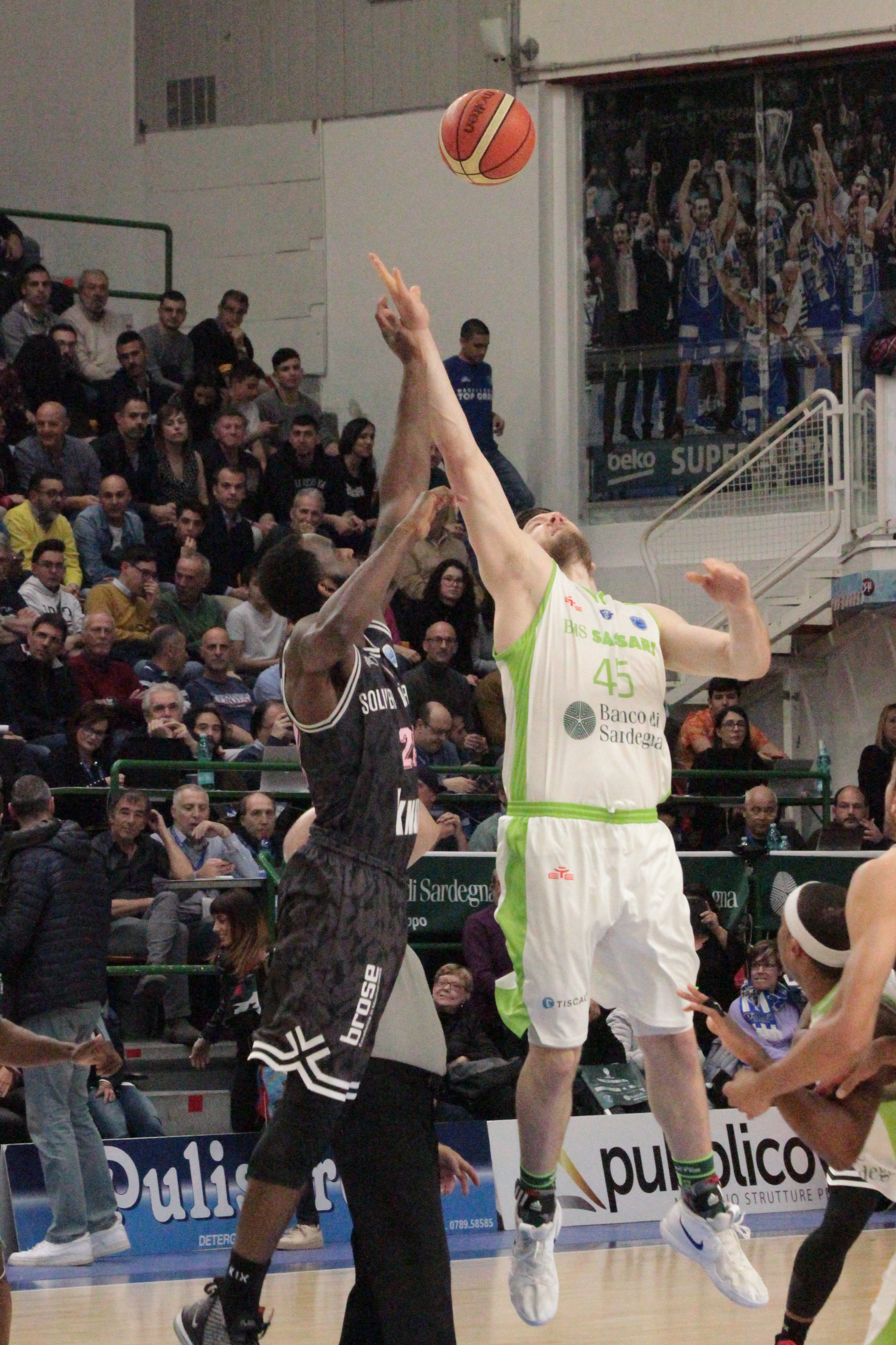
Cooley in Italy for the finals in FIBA Europe Cup 2018–2019

After going undrafted in the 2013 NBA draft, Cooley joined the Houston Rockets for the Orlando Summer League and the Memphis Grizzlies for the Las Vegas Summer League. On August 16, 2013, he signed with Trabzonspor of Turkey for the 2013–14 season.

In July 2014, Cooley joined the Memphis Grizzlies for the Orlando Summer League and the Cleveland Cavaliers for the Las Vegas Summer League. On August 19, 2014, he signed with the Utah Jazz. However, he was later waived by the Jazz on October 22, 2014. On November 3, 2014, he was acquired by the Idaho Stampede as an affiliate player. On November 18, 2014, he was deactivated by the Stampede after he injured his thumb in the season opening game against the Erie BayHawks on November 14. He was reactivated on January 9, 2015, after recovering from the injury.

On February 24, 2015, Cooley signed a 10-day contract with the Utah Jazz. Following the conclusion of his 10-day contract on March 6, he was not retained by the Jazz and subsequently returned to the Stampede, playing for them that night. He went on to set a new NBA D-League single-game record by grabbing 29 rebounds against the Los Angeles D-Fenders on March 13. He was then called up again by the Jazz, signing another 10-day contract with the team on March 16 and later signed a multi-year deal with the Jazz on March 26. On October 13, he was waived by the Jazz.

On October 17, 2015, Cooley signed with the Cleveland Cavaliers. However, he was waived on October 23 after appearing in two preseason games. On November 16, he was reacquired by the Idaho Stampede. He appeared in six games for Idaho, with his final appearance coming on November 28. On December 4, he received a contract buyout from Idaho and signed for the rest of the season with the Spanish club Unicaja of the Liga ACB and the Euroleague.

On August 5, 2016, Cooley signed with German club MHP Riesen Ludwigsburg for the 2016–17 season.

On July 29, 2017, Cooley was signed to a two-way contract by the Sacramento Kings of the NBA. Under the terms of the deal, for the 2017–18 season, he will split time between the Kings and their G-League affiliate, the Reno Bighorns.

On July 27, 2018, Cooley signed a one-year deal with the Italian club Dinamo Sassari of the LBA.

In July 2019, Cooley signed with the Ryukyu Golden Kings in Japan. Cooley had 31 points and 21 rebounds against the Niigata Albirex BB on March 15, 2020. He finished ninth in scoring with 18.4 points per game and pulled down a league-best 13.3 rebounds per game.

== NBA career statistics ==
Legend
| GP | Games played | GS | Games started | MPG | Minutes per game |
| FG% | Field goal percentage | 3P% | 3-point field goal percentage | FT% | Free throw percentage |
| RPG | Rebounds per game | APG | Assists per game | SPG | Steals per game |
| BPG | Blocks per game | PPG | Points per game | **Bold** | Career high |

=== Regular season ===
| Year | Team | GP | GS | MPG | FG% | 3P% | FT% | RPG | APG | SPG | BPG | PPG |
|---|---|---|---|---|---|---|---|---|---|---|---|---|
| 2014–15 | Utah | 16 | 0 | 5.4 | .409 | – | .429 | 1.6 | .1 | **.4** | **.2** | 1.7 |
| 2017–18 | Sacramento | 7 | 0 | **12.4** | **.481** | – | **.737** | **4.3** | **.9** | .1 | .0 | **5.7** |
| Career | | 23 | 0 | 7.6 | .449 | – | .575 | 2.4 | .3 | .3 | .1 | 2.9 |
