= 2011–12 Philadelphia 76ers season =

NBA professional basketball team season

- Head coach: Doug Collins
- General manager: Rod Thorn
- Owner: Josh Harris
- Arena: Wells Fargo Center

Results
- Record: 35–31 (.530)
- Place: Division: 3rd (Atlantic); Conference: 8th (Eastern)
- Playoff finish: Conference semifinals (lost to Celtics 3–4)
- Stats at Basketball Reference

Local media
- Television: CSN Philadelphia; Comcast Network Philadelphia
- Radio: WIP-FM; WPHT; WPEN-FM (playoffs)

The 2011–12 Philadelphia 76ers season was the seventy-third season of the franchise, sixty-third in the National Basketball Association (NBA), and the forty-ninth in Philadelphia.

== Background ==
The Sixers finished the regular season with a 35–31 record, earning the eighth seed in the Eastern Conference and a berth in the 2012 NBA Playoffs. Philadelphia faced the top-seeded Chicago Bulls in the first round and won the series in six games. This marked the first time the Sixers won an NBA playoffs series since 2003, when the team defeated the New Orleans Hornets in six games in the First Round.

This was only the fifth time an eighth-seeded team beat a first-seeded team in the playoffs in league history, following the Denver Nuggets in 1994, the New York Knicks in 1999, the Golden State Warriors in 2007, and the Memphis Grizzlies in 2011.

The Sixers ended its postseason run after losing in seven games to the Boston Celtics in the Eastern Conference semi-finals. This marked the last time the Sixers made the playoffs until 2018.

== Key dates ==
- June 23: The 2011 NBA draft took place at Prudential Center in Newark, New Jersey.
- December 26: The 76ers begin their regular season with a loss against the Portland Trail Blazers
- April 23: Philadelphia secured a playoff spot in a 105–87 win against the New Jersey Nets.

== NBA draft ==
| Round | Pick | Player | Position | Nationality | College |
|---|---|---|---|---|---|
| 1 | 16 | Nikola Vučević | Center / forward | Montenegro | USC |
| 2 | 50 | Lavoy Allen | Center / forward | United States | Temple |

== Roster ==
2011–12 Philadelphia 76ers roster
Players

| Pos. | No. | Player | Height | Weight | DOB | From |
|---|---|---|---|---|---|---|
| PF | 50 | Lavoy Allen | 6 ft 9 in (2.06 m) | 225 lb (102 kg) | 1989-02-04 | Temple |
| C | 4 | Tony Battie | 6 ft 11 in (2.11 m) | 240 lb (109 kg) | 1976-02-11 | Texas Tech |
| PF | 33 | Craig Brackins | 6 ft 10 in (2.08 m) | 230 lb (104 kg) | 1987-10-09 | Iowa State |
| C | 42 | Elton Brand | 6 ft 9 in (2.06 m) | 254 lb (115 kg) | 1979-03-11 | Duke |
| C | 00 | Spencer Hawes | 7 ft 1 in (2.16 m) | 245 lb (111 kg) | 1988-04-28 | Washington |
| PG | 11 | Jrue Holiday | 6 ft 4 in (1.93 m) | 180 lb (82 kg) | 1990-06-12 | UCLA |
| SF | 9 | Andre Iguodala | 6 ft 6 in (1.98 m) | 207 lb (94 kg) | 1984-01-28 | Arizona |
| SG | 20 | Jodie Meeks | 6 ft 4 in (1.93 m) | 208 lb (94 kg) | 1987-08-21 | Kentucky |
| SG | 25 | Xavier Silas | 6 ft 5 in (1.96 m) | 205 lb (93 kg) | 1988-01-22 | Northern Illinois |
| SF | 12 | Evan Turner | 6 ft 7 in (2.01 m) | 205 lb (93 kg) | 1988-10-27 | Ohio State |
| C | 8 | Nikola Vučević | 7 ft 0 in (2.13 m) | 240 lb (109 kg) | 1990-10-24 | USC |
| PG | 23 | Louis Williams | 6 ft 1 in (1.85 m) | 175 lb (79 kg) | 1986-10-27 | South Gwinnett HS (GA) |
| SF | 7 | Sam Young | 6 ft 6 in (1.98 m) | 220 lb (100 kg) | 1985-06-01 | Pittsburgh |
| PF | 21 | Thaddeus Young | 6 ft 8 in (2.03 m) | 220 lb (100 kg) | 1988-06-21 | Georgia Tech |

Coaches
Head coach
- Doug Collins
Assistant(s)
- Jeff Capel II
- Michael Curry
- Brian James
- Aaron McKie

Legend
- (DP) Unsigned draft pick
- (FA) Free agent
- (S) Suspended
- Injured

Roster
Updated: April 24, 2012

== Pre-season ==
=== Game log ===
2011 pre-season game log
Pre-season: 5–2 (home: 2–0; road: 3–2)

| Game | Date | Team | Score | High points | High rebounds | High assists | Location Attendance | Record |
|---|---|---|---|---|---|---|---|---|
| 1 | December 16 | @ Washington | W 103–78 | Louis Williams (19) | Spencer Hawes (9) | Andre Iguodala, Jrue Holiday, Nikola Vucevic | Verizon Center | 1–0 |
| 2 | December 20 | Washington | W 101–94 | Jrue Holiday (24) | Spencer Hawes (13) | Jrue Holiday (6) | Wells Fargo Center | 2–0 |

2011–12 season schedule

== Regular season ==
=== Standings ===
Eastern Conference
| # | Team | W | L | PCT | GB | GP |
|---|---|---|---|---|---|---|
| 1 | z-Chicago Bulls | 50 | 16 | .758 | – | 66 |
| 2 | y-Miami Heat * | 46 | 20 | .697 | 4.0 | 66 |
| 3 | x-Indiana Pacers * | 42 | 24 | .636 | 8.0 | 66 |
| 4 | y-Boston Celtics | 39 | 27 | .591 | 11.0 | 66 |
| 5 | x-Atlanta Hawks | 40 | 26 | .606 | 10.0 | 66 |
| 6 | x-Orlando Magic | 37 | 29 | .561 | 13.0 | 66 |
| 7 | x-New York Knicks | 36 | 30 | .545 | 14.0 | 66 |
| 8 | x-Philadelphia 76ers | 35 | 31 | .530 | 15.0 | 66 |
| 9 | Milwaukee Bucks | 31 | 35 | .470 | 19.0 | 66 |
| 10 | Detroit Pistons | 25 | 41 | .379 | 25.0 | 66 |
| 11 | Toronto Raptors | 23 | 43 | .348 | 27.0 | 66 |
| 12 | New Jersey Nets | 22 | 44 | .333 | 28.0 | 66 |
| 13 | Cleveland Cavaliers | 21 | 45 | .318 | 29.0 | 66 |
| 14 | Washington Wizards | 20 | 46 | .303 | 30.0 | 66 |
| 15 | Charlotte Bobcats | 7 | 59 | .106 | 43.0 | 66 |

=== Game log ===
2011–12 game log
Total: 35–31 (home: 19–14; road: 16–17)
December: 2–2 (home: 0–0; road: 2–2)

| Game | Date | Team | Score | High points | High rebounds | High assists | Location Attendance | Record |
|---|---|---|---|---|---|---|---|---|
| 1 | December 26 | @ Portland | L 103–107 | Louis Williams (25) | Spencer Hawes (14) | Spencer Hawes (9) | Rose Garden; 20,509 | 0–1 |
| 2 | December 28 | @ Phoenix | W 103–83 | Three players (15) | Spencer Hawes (11) | Andre Iguodala (6) | US Airways Center; 16,360 | 1–1 |
| 3 | December 30 | @ Utah | L 99–102 | Jrue Holiday (22) | Spencer Hawes (13) | Louis Williams (5) | EnergySolutions Arena; 19,911 | 1–2 |
| 4 | December 31 | @ Golden State | W 107–79 | Louis Williams (23) | Spencer Hawes (12) | Andre Iguodala (7) | Oracle Arena; 19,084 | 2–2 |

January: 13–4 (home: 11–2; road: 2–2)

| Game | Date | Team | Score | High points | High rebounds | High assists | Location Attendance | Record |
|---|---|---|---|---|---|---|---|---|
| 5 | January 4 | @ New Orleans | W 101–93 | Jrue Holiday (23) | Elton Brand (12) | Jrue Holiday (8) | New Orleans Arena; 12,387 | 3–2 |
| 6 | January 6 | Detroit | W 96–73 | Jodie Meeks (21) | Spencer Hawes (14) | Jrue Holiday (9) | Wells Fargo Center; 19,408 | 4–2 |
| 7 | January 7 | Toronto | W 97–62 | Jrue Holiday; Andre Iguodala (14) | Andre Iguodala; Nikola Vučević (10) | Jrue Holiday (6) | Wells Fargo Center; 14,522 | 5–2 |
| 8 | January 9 | Indiana | W 96–86 | Andre Iguodala (20) | Andre Iguodala (9) | Louis Williams (6) | Wells Fargo Center; 8,612 | 6–2 |
| 9 | January 10 | Sacramento | W 112–85 | Elton Brand (21) | Elton Brand; Evan Turner (10) | Jrue Holiday; Evan Turner (8) | Wells Fargo Center; 10,255 | 7–2 |
| 10 | January 11 | @ New York | L 79–85 | Andre Iguodala; Evan Turner (16) | Elton Brand (10) | Jrue Holiday (4) | Madison Square Garden; 19,763 | 7–3 |
| 11 | January 13 | Washington | W 120–89 | Jodie Meeks (26) | Spencer Hawes (10) | Louis Williams (6) | Wells Fargo Center; 14,213 | 8–3 |
| 12 | January 14 | @ Washington | W 103–90 | Louis Williams (24) | Andre Iguodala (7) | Andre Iguodala (5) | Verizon Center; 13,998 | 9–3 |
| 13 | January 16 | Milwaukee | W 94–82 | Jrue Holiday (24) | Spencer Hawes (10) | Louis Williams (6) | Wells Fargo Center; 17,281 | 10–3 |
| 14 | January 18 | Denver | L 104–108 | Thaddeus Young (22) | Evan Turner (11) | Andre Iguodala (9) | Wells Fargo Center; 15,201 | 10–4 |
| 15 | January 20 | Atlanta | W 90–76 | Thaddeus Young (20) | Elton Brand (16) | Jrue Holiday (11) | Wells Fargo Center; 17,724 | 11–4 |
| 16 | January 21 | @ Miami | L 92–113 | Louis Williams (22) | Nikola Vucevic (9) | Jrue Holiday, Louis Williams, Evan Turner (4) | American Airlines Arena; 19,725 | 11–5 |
| 17 | January 23 | Washington | W 103–83 | Jrue Holiday, Elton Brand (17) | Elton Brand (9) | Andre Iguodala (11) | Wells Fargo Center; 10,108 | 12–5 |
| 18 | January 25 | New Jersey | L 90–97 | Louis Williams (17) | Jodie Meeks (8) | Jrue Holiday (7) | Wells Fargo Center; 13,138 | 12–6 |
| 19 | January 27 | Charlotte | W 89–72 | Louis Williams (17) | Evan Turner, Lavoy Allen (7) | Andre Iguodala (6) | Wells Fargo Center; 16,199 | 13–6 |
| 20 | January 28 | Detroit | W 95–74 | Louis Williams (17) | Andre Iguodala (10) | Andre Iguodala (10) | Wells Fargo Center; 18,710 | 14–6 |
| 21 | January 30 | Orlando | W 74–69 | Andre Iguodala (14) | Andre Iguodala (11) | Andre Iguodala, Jrue Holiday (6) | Wells Fargo Center; 16,299 | 15–6 |

February: 6–9 (home: 2–5; road: 4–4)

| Game | Date | Team | Score | High points | High rebounds | High assists | Location Attendance | Record |
|---|---|---|---|---|---|---|---|---|
| 22 | February 1 | Chicago | W 98–82 | Andre Iguodala, Thaddeus Young (19) | Andre Iguodala (9) | Louis Williams (6) | Wells Fargo Center; 18,325 | 16–6 |
| 23 | February 3 | Miami | L 79–99 | Thaddeus Young (16) | Andre Iguodala, Tony Battie (7) | Jrue Holiday (7) | Wells Fargo Center; 20,694 | 16–7 |
| 24 | February 4 | @ Atlanta | W 98–87 | Nikola Vucevic (15) | Andre Iguodala (8) | Andre Iguodala (10) | Philips Arena; 18,012 | 17–7 |
| 25 | February 6 | L. A. Lakers | W 95–90 | Louis Williams (24) | Nikola Vucevic (6) | Jrue Holiday (6) | Wells Fargo Center; 20,064 | 18–7 |
| 26 | February 8 | San Antonio | L 90–100 | Louis Williams (22) | Elton Brand (13) | Jrue Holiday (7) | Wells Fargo Center; 18,070 | 18–8 |
| 27 | February 10 | L. A. Clippers | L 77–78 | Elton Brand; Andre Iguodala (12) | Elton Brand (10) | Jrue Holiday (8) | Wells Fargo Center; 20,539 | 18–9 |
| 28 | February 11 | @ Cleveland | W 99–84 | Jrue Holiday (20) | Andre Iguodala; Thaddeus Young (6) | Three players (5) | Quicken Loans Arena; 17,155 | 19–9 |
| 29 | February 13 | @ Charlotte | W 98–89 | Lou Williams (23) | Nikola Vucevic (10) | Andre Iguodala (9) | Time Warner Cable Arena; 13,773 | 20–9 |
| 30 | February 15 | @ Orlando | L 87–103 | Louis Williams (21) | Evan Turner (8) | Louis Williams (7) | Amway Center; 18,846 | 20–10 |
| 31 | February 17 | Dallas | L 75–82 | Nikola Vucevic (26) | Lavoy Allen (10) | Andre Iguodala (7) | Wells Fargo Center; 19,369 | 20–11 |
| 32 | February 19 | @ Minnesota | L 91–92 | Jrue Holiday (20) | Lavoy Allen (8) | Andre Iguodala; Evan Turner (3) | Target Center; 18,759 | 20–12 |
| 33 | February 21 | @ Memphis | L 76–89 | Jrue Holiday (22) | Thaddeus Young (7) | Andre Iguodala (7) | FedExForum; 14,258 | 20–13 |
| 34 | February 22 | @ Houston | L 87–93 | Nikola Vucevic (18) | Nikola Vucevic (8) | Andre Iguodala (4) | Toyota Center; 12,820 | 20–14 |
All-Star Break
| 35 | February 28 | @ Detroit | W 97–68 | Thaddeus Young (20) | Thaddeus Young (8) | Lou Williams (7) | The Palace of Auburn Hills; 11,916 | 21–14 |
| 36 | February 29 | Oklahoma City | L 88–92 | Jrue Holiday; Andre Iguodala (18) | Elton Brand (10) | Andre Iguodala; Louis Williams (6) | Wells Fargo Center; 19,746 | 21–15 |

March: 8–8 (home: 6–3; road: 2–5)

| Game | Date | Team | Score | High points | High rebounds | High assists | Location Attendance | Record |
|---|---|---|---|---|---|---|---|---|
| 37 | March 2 | Golden State | W 105–83 | Lou Williams (25) | Elton Brand (14) | Andre Iguodala (6) | Wells Fargo Center; 18,323 | 22–15 |
| 38 | March 4 | Chicago | L 91–96 | Thaddeus Young (17) | Elton Brand (13) | Louis Williams (7) | Wells Fargo Center; 19,683 | 22–16 |
| 39 | March 5 | @ Milwaukee | L 93–97 | Lou Williams (26) | Thaddeus Young (13) | Jrue Holiday, Andre Iguodala (5) | Bradley Center; 12,315 | 22–17 |
| 40 | March 7 | Boston | W 103–71 | Evan Turner (26) | Nikola Vucevic (12) | Andre Iguodala (8) | Wells Fargo Center; 18,508 | 23–17 |
| 41 | March 9 | Utah | W 104–91 | Lou Williams; Thaddeus Young (21) | Evan Turner (12) | Andre Iguodala (10) | Wells Fargo Center; 18,512 | 24–17 |
| 42 | March 11 | @ New York | W 106–94 | Lou Williams (28) | Evan Turner (15) | Andre Iguodala (8) | Madison Square Garden; 19,763 | 25–17 |
| 43 | March 14 | @ Indiana | L 94–111 | Evan Turner (21) | Elton Brand; Evan Turner (5) | Andre Iguodala (9) | Bankers Life Fieldhouse; 13,081 | 25–18 |
| 44 | March 16 | Miami | L 78–84 | Evan Turner (13) | Andre Iguodala (10) | Evan Turner (5) | Wells Fargo Center; 20,396 | 25–19 |
| 45 | March 17 | @ Chicago | L 80–89 | Jrue Holiday (30) | Spencer Hawes; Thaddeus Young (7) | Jrue Holiday (5) | United Center; 22,225 | 25–20 |
| 46 | March 19 | @ Charlotte | W 105–80 | Jrue Holiday; Thaddeus Young (20) | Spencer Hawes (11) | Jrue Holiday (6) | Time Warner Cable Arena; 12,792 | 26–20 |
| 47 | March 21 | New York | L 79–82 | Jrue Holiday (16) | Elton Brand (12) | Jrue Holiday; Andre Iguodala (6) | Wells Fargo Center; 20,470 | 26–21 |
| 48 | March 23 | Boston | W 99–86 | Elton Brand (20) | Spencer Hawes (10) | Andre Iguodala (8) | Wells Fargo Center; 19,583 | 27–21 |
| 49 | March 25 | @ San Antonio | L 76–93 | Elton Brand (14) | Elton Brand; Sam Young (9) | Spencer Hawes (4) | AT&T Center; 18,581 | 27–22 |
| 50 | March 27 | Cleveland | W 103–85 | Jodie Meeks (31) | Spencer Hawes (8) | Louis Williams (9) | Wells Fargo Center; 17,832 | 28–22 |
| 51 | March 30 | @ Washington | L 76–97 | Louis Williams; Thaddeus Young (14) | Elton Brand (9) | Jrue Holiday (4) | Verizon Center; 18,066 | 28–23 |
| 52 | March 31 | Atlanta | W 95–90 | Elton Brand (25) | Elton Brand (10) | Jrue Holiday (6) | Wells Fargo Center; 19,714 | 29–23 |

April: 6–8 (home: 0–4; road: 6–4)

| Game | Date | Team | Score | High points | High rebounds | High assists | Location Attendance | Record |
|---|---|---|---|---|---|---|---|---|
| 53 | April 3 | @ Miami | L 93–99 | Evan Turner (26) | Evan Turner (8) | Jrue Holiday (6) | American Airlines Arena; 20,015 | 29–24 |
| 54 | April 4 | Toronto | L 78–99 | Elton Brand; Jrue Holiday (20) | Spencer Hawes (9) | Andre Iguodala (6) | Wells Fargo Center; 18,186 | 29–25 |
| 55 | April 7 | Orlando | L 82–88 | Thaddeus Young (20) | Elton Brand (11) | Andre Iguodala (10) | Wells Fargo Center; 19,775 | 29–26 |
| 56 | April 8 | @ Boston | L 79–103 | Nikola Vucevic (14) | Nikola Vucevic (13) | Louis Williams (5) | TD Garden; 18,624 | 29–27 |
| 57 | April 10 | @ New Jersey | W 107–88 | Louis Williams (20) | Four players (8) | Andre Iguodala (7) | Prudential Center; 15,376 | 30–27 |
| 58 | April 11 | @ Toronto | W 93–75 | Thaddeus Young (17) | Elton Brand; Evan Turner (8) | Jrue Holiday (7) | Air Canada Centre; 16,324 | 31–27 |
| 59 | April 13 | New Jersey | L 89–95 | Jrue Holiday (19) | Spencer Hawes (10) | Jrue Holiday (6) | Wells Fargo Center; 19,169 | 31–28 |
| 60 | April 16 | @ Orlando | L 100–113 | Jrue Holiday (18) | Andre Iguodala (8) | Spencer Hawes (9) | Amway Center; 18,846 | 31–29 |
| 61 | April 17 | Indiana | L 97–102 | Andre Iguodala (23) | Elton Brand; Spencer Hawes (8) | Andre Iguodala (6) | Wells Fargo Center; 18,969 | 31–30 |
| 62 | April 18 | @ Cleveland | W 103–87 | Jrue Holiday (24) | Andre Iguodala (13) | Andre Iguodala (7) | Quicken Loans Arena; 14,678 | 32–30 |
| 63 | April 21 | @ Indiana | W 109–106 (OT) | Elton Brand (20) | Elton Brand (9) | Jrue Holiday (7) | Bankers Life Fieldhouse; 17,701 | 33–30 |
| 64 | April 23 | @ New Jersey | W 105–87 | Three players (15) | Andre Iguodala (7) | Andre Iguodala (9) | Prudential Center; 18,711 | 34–30 |
| 65 | April 25 | @ Milwaukee | W 90–85 | Evan Turner (29) | Evan Turner (13) | Evan Turner (6) | Bradley Center; 13,489 | 35–30 |
| 66 | April 26 | @ Detroit | L 86–108 | Spencer Hawes (16) | Nikola Vucevic (12) | Evan Turner (6) | The Palace of Auburn Hills; 15,372 | 35–31 |

2011–12 season schedule

== Playoffs ==
2012 playoff game log
First round: 4–2 (home: 3–0; road: 1–2)

| Game | Date | Team | Score | High points | High rebounds | High assists | Location Attendance | Series |
|---|---|---|---|---|---|---|---|---|
| 1 | April 28 | @ Chicago | L 91–103 | Elton Brand (19) | Elton Brand, Jrue Holiday (7) | Andre Iguodala, Evan Turner (5) | United Center; 21,943 | 0–1 |
| 2 | May 1 | @ Chicago | W 109–92 | Jrue Holiday (26) | Lavoy Allen (9) | Three players (6) | United Center; 22,067 | 1–1 |
| 3 | May 4 | Chicago | W 79–74 | Spencer Hawes (21) | Thaddeus Young (11) | Jrue Holiday (6) | Wells Fargo Center; 20,381 | 2–1 |
| 4 | May 6 | Chicago | W 89–82 | Spencer Hawes (22) | Andre Iguodala (12) | Jrue Holiday (6) | Wells Fargo Center; 20,381 | 3–1 |
| 5 | May 8 | @ Chicago | L 69–77 | Spencer Hawes (16) | Andre Iguodala (14) | Jrue Holiday (4) | United Center; 22,093 | 3–2 |
| 6 | May 10 | Chicago | W 79–78 | Andre Iguodala (20) | Spencer Hawes (10) | Andre Iguodala (7) | Wells Fargo Center; 20,362 | 4–2 |

Conference Semi-finals: 3–4 (home: 2–1; road: 1–3)

| Game | Date | Team | Score | High points | High rebounds | High assists | Location Attendance | Series |
|---|---|---|---|---|---|---|---|---|
| 1 | May 12 | @ Boston | L 91–92 | Andre Iguodala (19) | Evan Turner (10) | Andre Iguodala (6) | TD Garden; 18,624 | 0–1 |
| 2 | May 14 | @ Boston | W 82–81 | Jrue Holiday (18) | Spencer Hawes (10) | Andre Iguodala (7) | TD Garden; 18,624 | 1–1 |
| 3 | May 16 | Boston | L 91–107 | Thaddeus Young (22) | Evan Turner (8) | Jrue Holiday (9) | Wells Fargo Center; 20,351 | 1–2 |
| 4 | May 18 | Boston | W 92–83 | Andre Iguodala, Evan Turner (16) | Lavoy Allen (10) | Louis Williams (8) | Wells Fargo Center; 20,411 | 2–2 |
| 5 | May 21 | @ Boston | L 85–101 | Elton Brand (19) | Evan Turner (10) | Jrue Holiday (7) | TD Garden; 18,624 | 2–3 |
| 6 | May 23 | Boston | W 82–75 | Jrue Holiday (20) | Elton Brand (10) | Jrue Holiday, Louis Williams (6) | Wells Fargo Center; 20,403 | 3–3 |
| 7 | May 26 | @ Boston | L 75–85 | Andre Iguodala (18) | Thaddeus Young (10) | Jrue Holiday (9) | TD Garden; 18,624 | 3–4 |

2012 playoff schedule

== Player statistics ==
Legend
| GP | Games played | GS | Games started | MPG | Minutes per game |
| FG% | Field-goal percentage | 3P% | 3-point field-goal percentage | FT% | Free-throw percentage |
| RPG | Rebounds per game | APG | Assists per game | SPG | Steals per game |
| BPG | Blocks per game | PPG | Points per game |

=== Season ===
| Player | GP | GS | MPG | FG% | 3P% | FT% | RPG | APG | SPG | BPG | PPG |
|---|---|---|---|---|---|---|---|---|---|---|---|
| Lavoy Allen | 41 | 15 | 15.2 | .473 | | .786 | 4.2 | .8 | .3 | .4 | 4.1 |
| Tony Battie | 27 | 11 | 10.9 | .373 | .000 | 1.000 | 2.5 | .6 | .1 | .2 | 1.6 |
| Craig Brackins | 14 | 1 | 6.3 | .273 | .333 | .500 | 1.1 | .6 | .0 | .1 | 1.6 |
| Elton Brand | 60 | 60 | 28.9 | .494 | .000 | .733 | 7.2 | 1.6 | 1.0 | 1.6 | 11.0 |
| Francisco Elson^{[1]} | 5 | 0 | 3.2 | .333 | | | .2 | .2 | .2 | .2 | .4 |
| Spencer Hawes | 37 | 29 | 24.9 | .489 | .250 | .727 | 7.3 | 2.6 | .4 | 1.3 | 9.6 |
| Jrue Holiday | 65 | 65 | 33.8 | .432 | .380 | .783 | 3.3 | 4.5 | 1.6 | .3 | 13.5 |
| Andre Iguodala | 62 | 62 | 35.6 | .454 | .394 | .617 | 6.1 | 5.5 | 1.7 | .5 | 12.4 |
| Jodie Meeks | 66 | 50 | 24.9 | .409 | .365 | .906 | 2.4 | .8 | .6 | .0 | 8.4 |
| Andrés Nocioni^{[1]} | 11 | 1 | 5.1 | .250 | .167 | .545 | 1.3 | .1 | .1 | .1 | 1.5 |
| Xavier Silas^{[1]} | 2 | 0 | 19.5 | .267 | .167 | .667 | 2.0 | 1.5 | .0 | .0 | 5.5 |
| Evan Turner | 65 | 20 | 26.4 | .446 | .224 | .676 | 5.8 | 2.8 | .6 | .3 | 9.4 |
| Nikola Vučević | 51 | 15 | 15.9 | .450 | .375 | .529 | 4.8 | .6 | .4 | .7 | 5.5 |
| Louis Williams | 64 | 0 | 26.3 | .407 | .362 | .812 | 2.4 | 3.5 | .8 | .3 | 14.9 |
| Sam Young^{[1]} | 14 | 0 | 9.6 | .295 | .625 | .643 | 1.5 | .4 | .4 | .3 | 2.9 |
| Thaddeus Young | 63 | 1 | 27.9 | .507 | .250 | .771 | 5.2 | 1.2 | 1.0 | .7 | 12.8 |

- ^{1} Statistics with the Philadelphia 76ers.

=== Playoffs ===
| Player | GP | GS | MPG | FG% | 3P% | FT% | RPG | APG | SPG | BPG | PPG |
|---|---|---|---|---|---|---|---|---|---|---|---|
| Lavoy Allen | 12 | 1 | 19.7 | .557 | | .583 | 4.9 | .3 | .8 | .9 | 6.3 |
| Elton Brand | 13 | 13 | 27.4 | .465 | | .625 | 4.8 | .5 | .8 | 1.5 | 8.6 |
| Spencer Hawes | 13 | 12 | 25.5 | .463 | .400 | .731 | 6.6 | 1.6 | .3 | .9 | 9.3 |
| Jrue Holiday | 13 | 13 | 38.0 | .413 | .408 | .864 | 4.7 | 5.2 | 1.6 | .6 | 15.8 |
| Andre Iguodala | 13 | 13 | 38.8 | .384 | .388 | .589 | 5.7 | 3.7 | 1.5 | .4 | 12.9 |
| Jodie Meeks | 13 | 1 | 7.8 | .346 | .231 | 1.000 | .3 | .3 | .2 | .1 | 2.7 |
| Xavier Silas | 2 | 0 | 2.0 | 1.000 | | | 1.0 | .0 | .0 | .0 | 1.0 |
| Evan Turner | 13 | 12 | 34.5 | .364 | .000 | .688 | 7.5 | 2.5 | .9 | .5 | 11.2 |
| Nikola Vučević | 1 | 0 | 3.0 | .000 | | .500 | 1.0 | .0 | .0 | .0 | 1.0 |
| Louis Williams | 13 | 0 | 27.5 | .352 | .167 | .788 | 2.1 | 3.0 | 1.0 | .0 | 11.5 |
| Sam Young | 2 | 0 | 2.0 | .000 | .000 | | .0 | .0 | .0 | .0 | .0 |
| Thaddeus Young | 13 | 0 | 21.3 | .429 | | .710 | 5.2 | 1.2 | .5 | .5 | 7.7 |

== Awards and milestones ==
- Andre Iguodala was selected for the 2012 NBA All-Star Game. It was his first appearance.

== Disciplinary actions ==
- Head coach Doug Collins was fined US$15,000 for verbally abusing an official during a game against the Indiana Pacers.

== Transactions ==
=== Overview ===
Players Added

Via draft

- Lavoy Allen
- Nikola Vučević

Via free agency

- Xavier Silas

Via trade

- Sam Young

10-day contracts

- Francisco Elson
Players Lost

Via trade

- Marreese Speights

Via free agency

- Jason Kapono

Waived

- Andrés Nocioni

=== Trades ===
| January 4, 2012 | To Philadelphia 76ers 2012 second round pick (from Memphis); 2013 second round pick (from New Orleans) | To Memphis Grizzlies Marreese Speights To New Orleans Hornets Xavier Henry (from Memphis) |
| March 15, 2012 | To Philadelphia 76ers Sam Young | To Memphis Grizzlies Draft rights to Ricky Sánchez |

=== Free agents ===
Additions
| Player | Date signed | Former team |
|---|---|---|
| Thaddeus Young | December 10 | Re-signed |
| Spencer Hawes | December 11 | Re-signed |
| Tony Battie | December 12 | Re-signed |
| Francisco Elson | January 27 | Utah Jazz |
| Xavier Silas | April 24 | Maine Red Claws (from D-League) |

Subtractions
| Player | Date signed | New team |
|---|---|---|
| Jason Kapono | December 9 | Los Angeles Lakers |

Many players signed with teams from other leagues due to the 2011 NBA lockout. FIBA allows players under NBA contracts to sign and play for teams from other leagues if the contracts have opt-out clauses that allow the players to return to the NBA if the lockout ends. The Chinese Basketball Association, however, only allows its clubs to sign foreign free agents who could play for at least the entire season.

Played in other leagues during lockout
| Player | Date signed | New team | Opt-out clause |
|---|---|---|---|
| Darius Songaila | July 8 | Galatasaray Medical Park (Turkey) | No |
| Lavoy Allen | July 14 | Strasbourg IG (France) | Yes |
| Nikola Vučević | August 22 | Budućnost Podgorica (Montenegro) | Yes |
| Craig Brackins | August 25 | Maccabi Ashdod (Israel) | Yes |
| Andrés Nocioni | November 14 | Peñarol (Argentina) | Yes |

== See also ==
2011–12 NBA season
