= 2011 NBA draft =

Basketball player selection

General information
- Sport: Basketball
- Date: June 23, 2011
- Location: Prudential Center (Newark, New Jersey)
- Network: ESPN

Overview
- 60 total selections in 2 rounds
- League: NBA
- First selection: Kyrie Irving (Cleveland Cavaliers)

The 2011 NBA draft was held on June 23, 2011, at Prudential Center in Newark, New Jersey. The draft started at 8:00 p.m. Eastern Daylight Time (23:00 UTC), and was broadcast in the United States on ESPN. Kia Motors was the presenting sponsor of the 2011 NBA draft. In this draft, National Basketball Association (NBA) teams took turns selecting amateur U.S. college basketball players and other eligible players, including international players. The Cleveland Cavaliers had the first pick due to a previous trade they had involving the Los Angeles Clippers, choosing point guard Kyrie Irving of Duke. Of the 60 players drafted, 7 were freshmen, 7 were sophomores, 14 were juniors, 19 were seniors, 12 were international players without U.S. college basketball experience (including the first-ever Qatari-selected player), and 1 was a D-League player.

The 2011 NBA draft marked the final time the New Jersey Nets made an NBA draft appearance. After the end of the Nets' 2011–12 season, the franchise relocated to Brooklyn, New York and was renamed to the Brooklyn Nets. The Nets made their first draft appearance with the Brooklyn moniker in 2012. Four of the first-round picks, including three of the top four picks, Kyrie Irving, Derrick Williams, Tristan Thompson, and Iman Shumpert, would all eventually become teammates on the Cleveland Cavaliers. The 2011 draft is considered one of the most abundant drafts in NBA history; seven players in the draft would play in at least two All-Star games and six were selected to at least one All-NBA Team, including the final pick of the draft, Isaiah Thomas. As of 2026, seven players from this draft remained in NBA: Kyrie Irving, Bismack Biyombo, Klay Thompson, Kawhi Leonard, Nikola Vučević, Tobias Harris, and Jimmy Butler.

== Draft selections ==
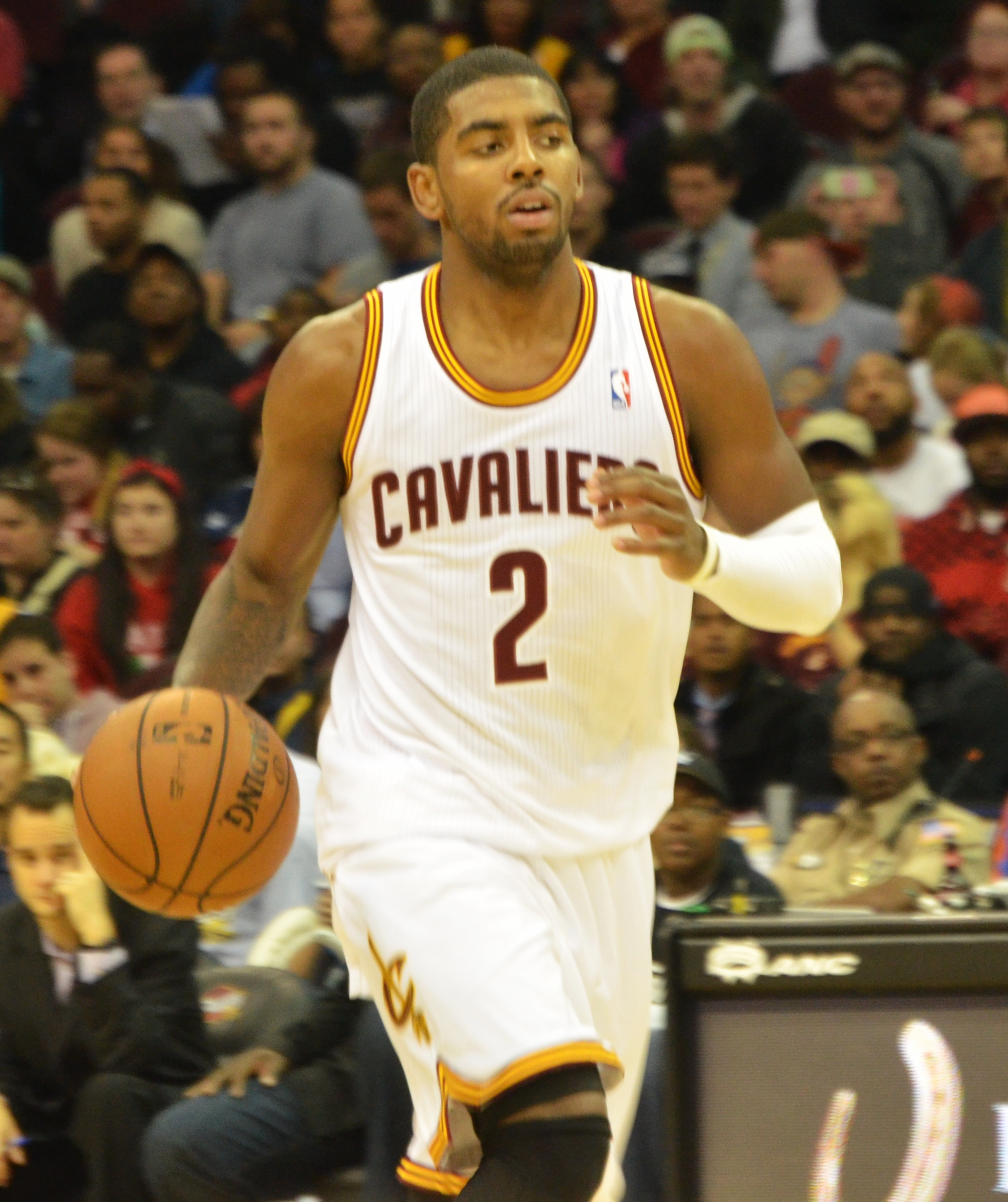
Kyrie Irving was selected 1st overall by the Cleveland Cavaliers.

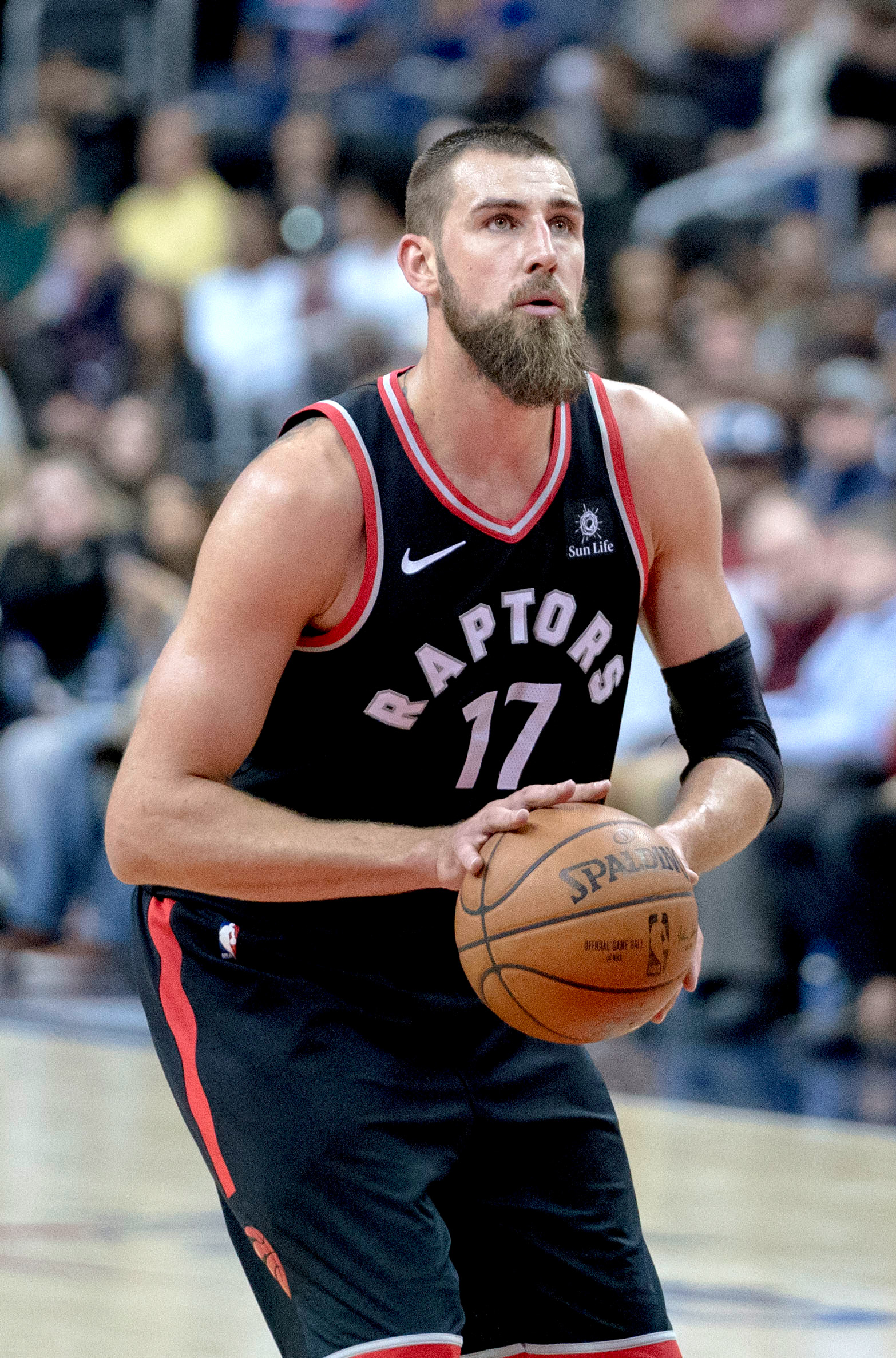
Jonas Valančiūnas was selected 5th overall by the Toronto Raptors.

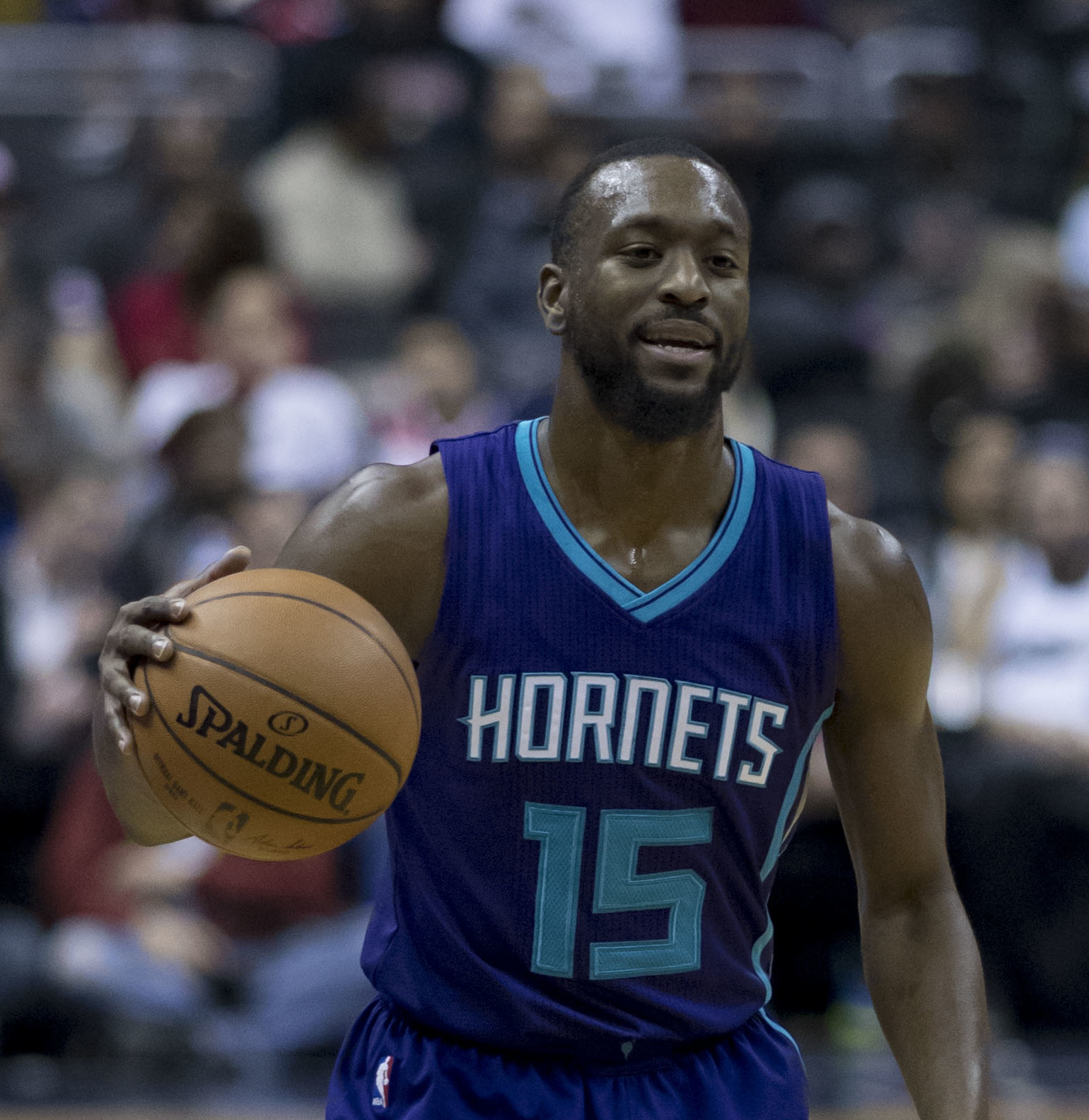
Kemba Walker was selected 9th overall by the Charlotte Bobcats.

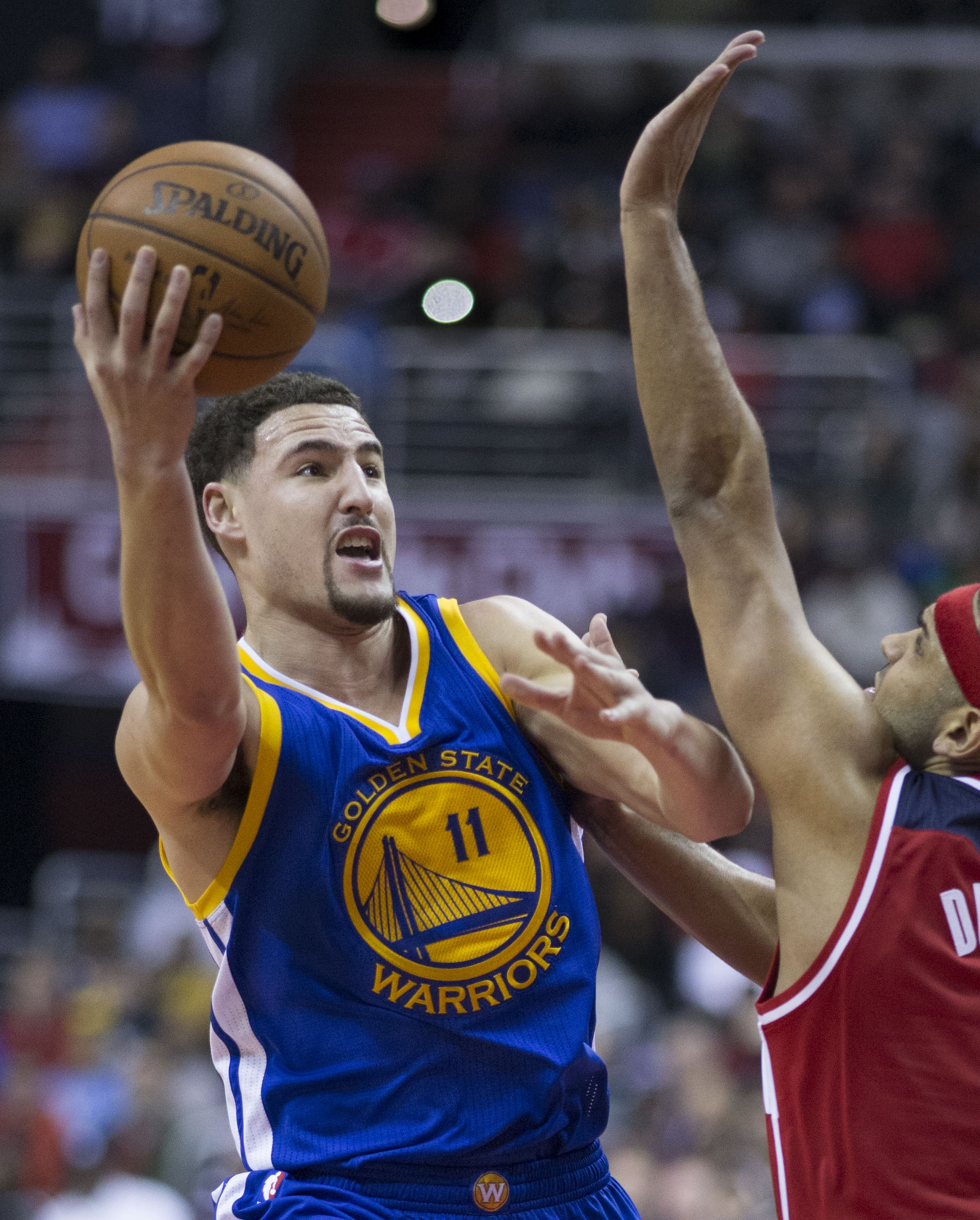
Klay Thompson was selected 11th overall by the Golden State Warriors.

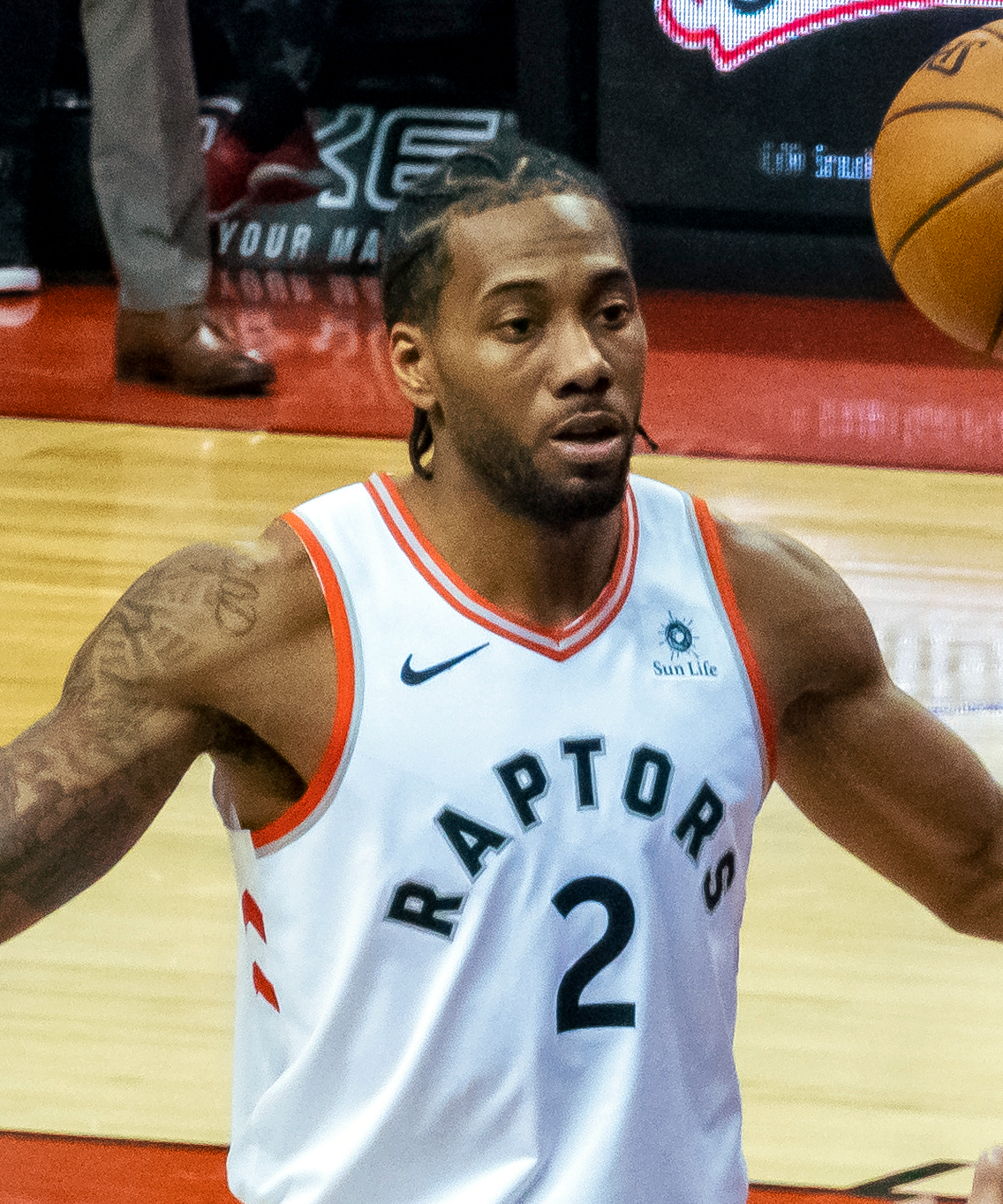
Kawhi Leonard was selected 15th overall by the Indiana Pacers (traded to the San Antonio Spurs).

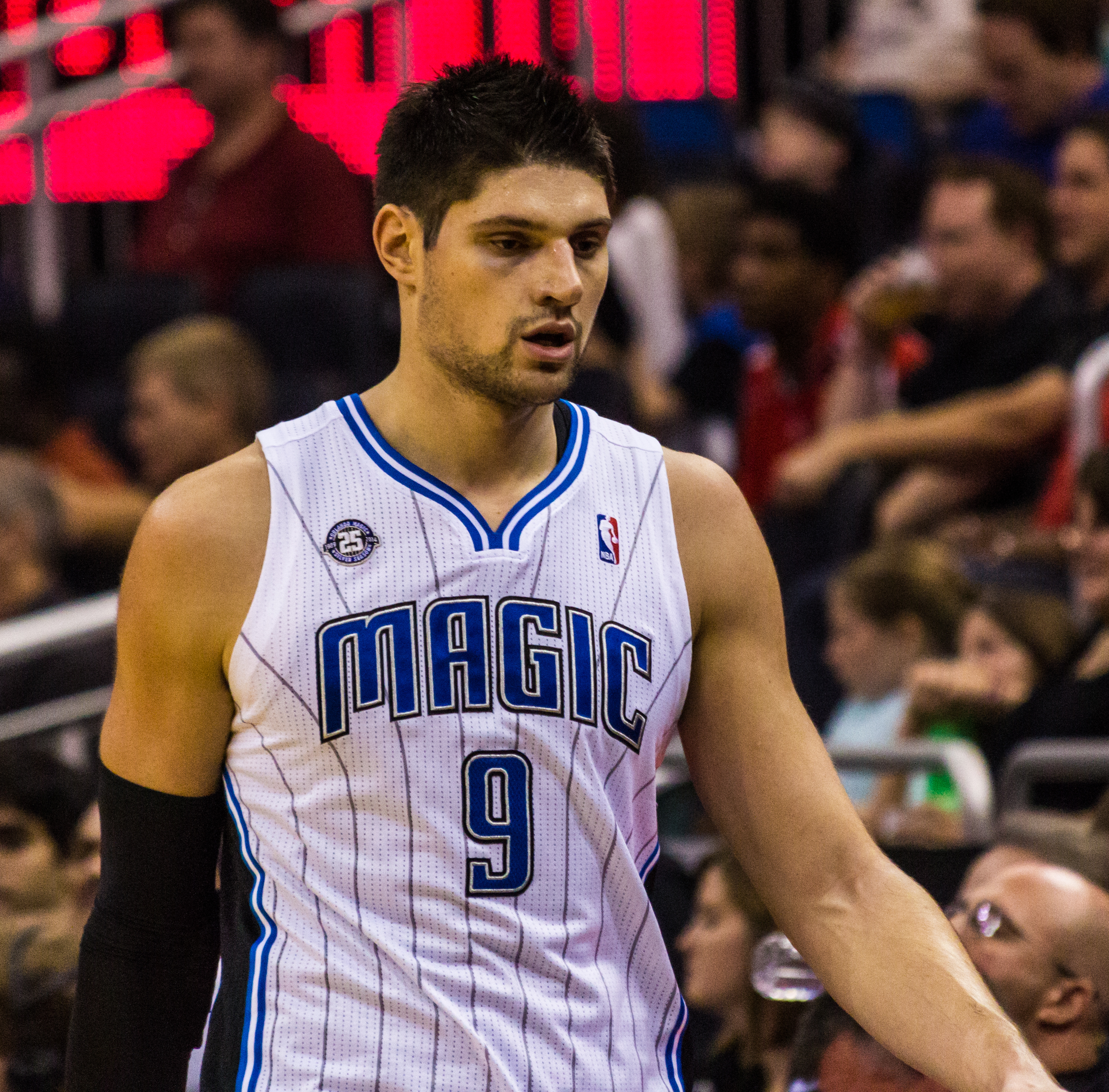
Nikola Vučević was selected 16th overall by the Philadelphia 76ers.

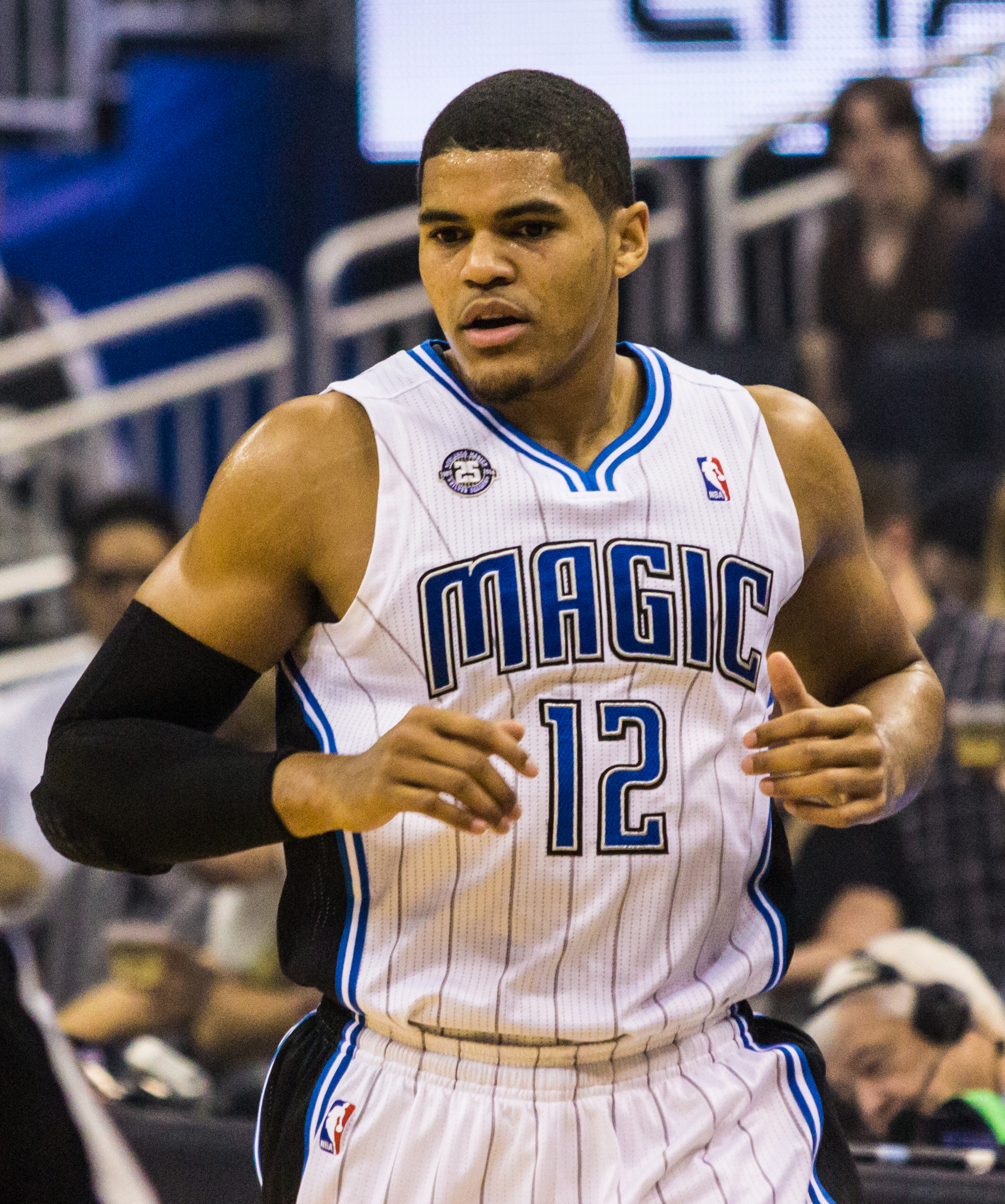
Tobias Harris was selected 19th overall by the Charlotte Bobcats (traded to the Milwaukee Bucks).

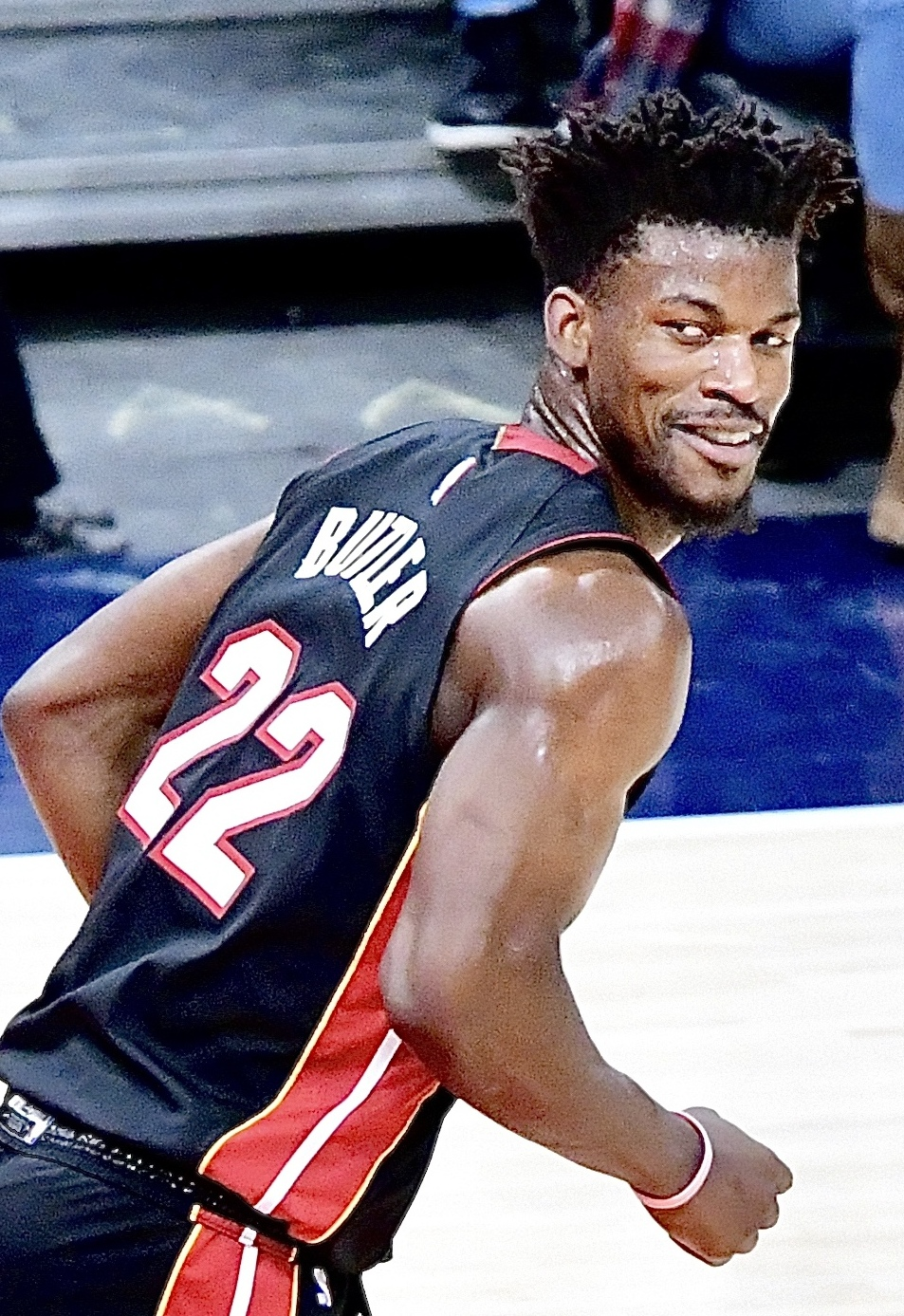
Jimmy Butler was selected 30th overall by the Chicago Bulls.

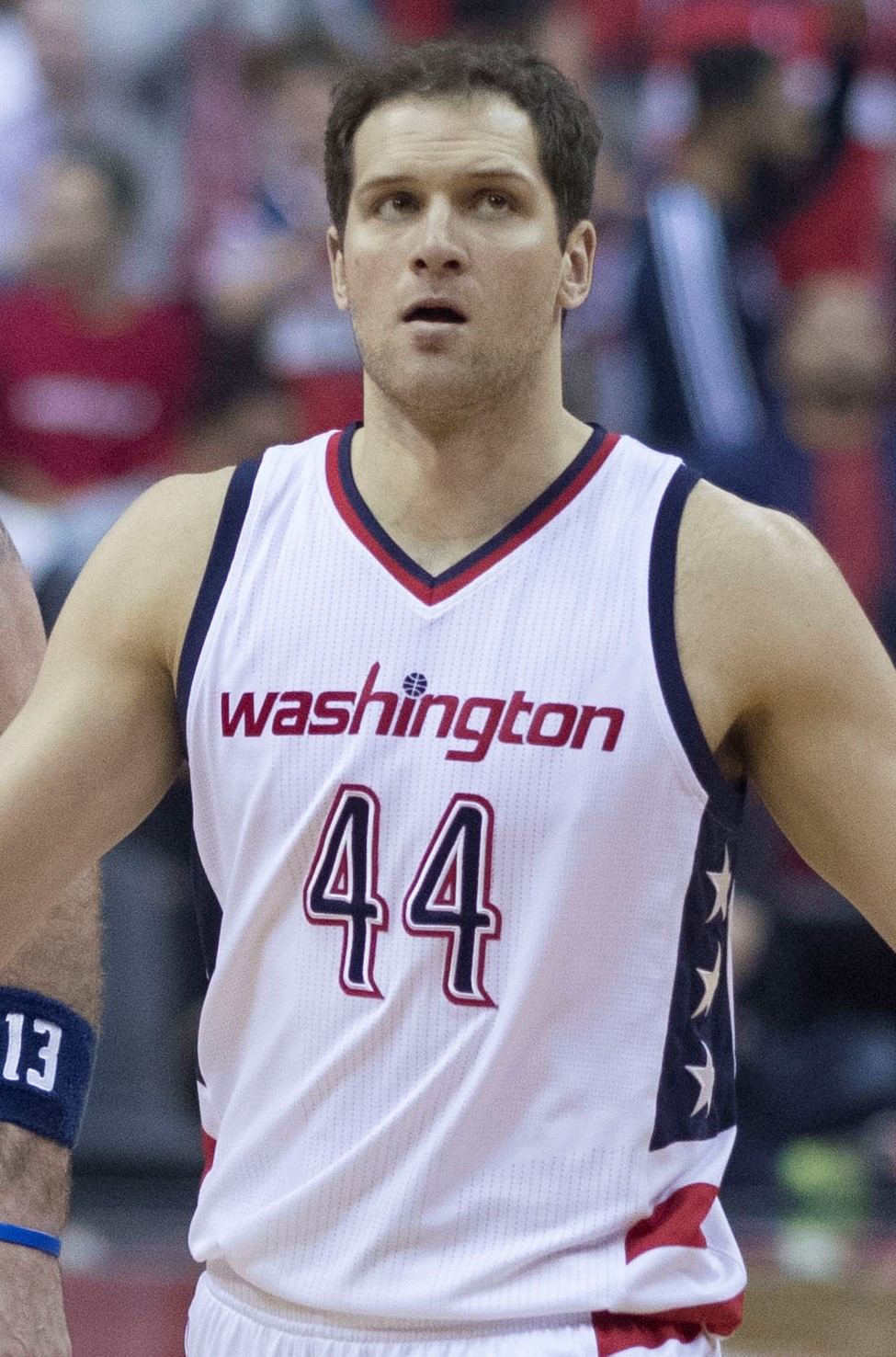
Bojan Bogdanović was selected 31st by the Miami Heat (traded to the New Jersey Nets).

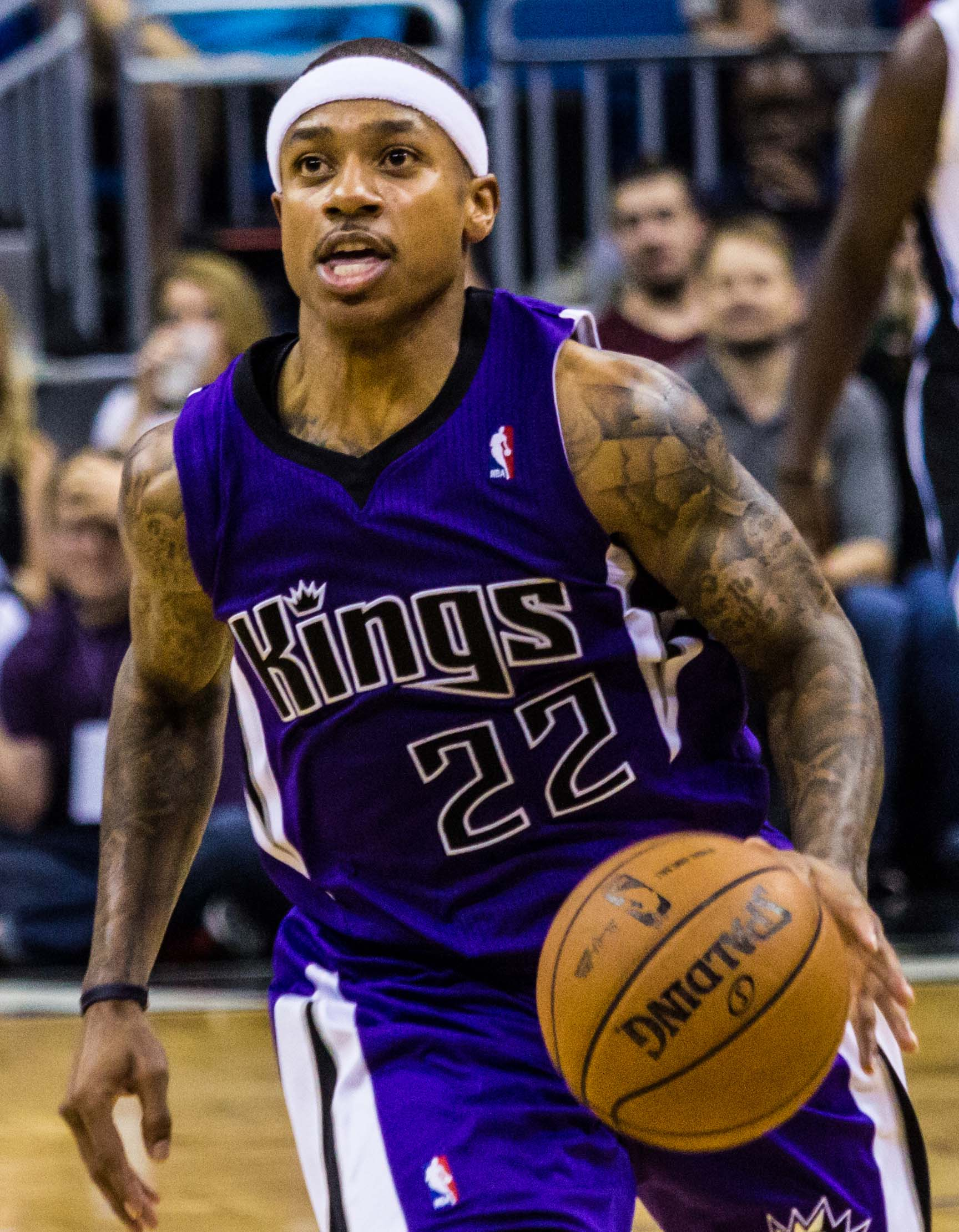
Isaiah Thomas was selected 60th overall by the Sacramento Kings.

PG	Point guard	SG	Shooting guard	SF	Small forward	PF	Power forward	C	Center

*	Denotes player who has been selected for at least one All-Star Game and All-NBA Team
^{+}	Denotes player who has been selected for at least one All-Star Game
^{#}	Denotes player who has never appeared in an NBA regular-season or playoff game
^{~}	Denotes player who has been selected as Rookie of the Year

Round	Pick	Player	Position	Nationality (Note: Nationality indicates the player's national team or representative nationality. If a player has not competed at the international level, then the nationality indicates the national team which the player is eligible to represent according to FIBA rules.)	Team	School/club team
1	1	Kyrie Irving^{*~}	PG	United States (Note: Kyrie Irving was born in Australia to American parents who returned to the U.S. when he was two years old. He has dual U.S. and Australian citizenship, but has represented the United States internationally.)	Cleveland Cavaliers (from L.A. Clippers)^{[a]}	Duke (Fr.)
1	2	Derrick Williams	SF/PF	United States	Minnesota Timberwolves	Arizona (So.)
1	3	Enes Kanter	C	Turkey (Note: Enes Kanter was born in Switzerland to Turkish parents. He has represented Turkey internationally in competitions until 2015 in part due to political discourse there. On November 29, 2021, he not only became a legal American citizen, but he also changed his name to Enes Kanter Freedom around that same period of time.)	Utah Jazz (from New Jersey)^{[b]}	Stoneridge Preparatory School (Simi Valley) (Note: Although Enes Kanter enrolled at Kentucky, he never played because he was ruled ineligible to play by the NCAA for receiving financial benefits from his previous professional team, Fenerbahçe Ülker, during the 2008–09 season.)
1	4	Tristan Thompson	C/PF	Canada (Note: Thompson acquired American citizenship in 2020.)	Cleveland Cavaliers	Texas (Fr.)
1	5	Jonas Valančiūnas	C	Lithuania	Toronto Raptors^{[c]}	Lietuvos rytas Vilnius (Lithuania)
1	6	Jan Veselý	PF	Czech Republic	Washington Wizards	Partizan Belgrade (Serbia)
1	7	Bismack Biyombo	C	DR Congo	Sacramento Kings (traded to Charlotte)^{[A]}	Fuenlabrada (Spain)
1	8	Brandon Knight	PG	United States	Detroit Pistons	Kentucky (Fr.)
1	9	Kemba Walker^{*}	PG	United States	Charlotte Bobcats	Connecticut (Jr.)
1	10	Jimmer Fredette	PG/SG	United States	Milwaukee Bucks (traded to Sacramento)^{[A]}	BYU (Sr.)
1	11	Klay Thompson^{*}	SG	United States	Golden State Warriors	Washington State (Jr.)
1	12	Alec Burks	SG	United States	Utah Jazz	Colorado (So.)
1	13	Markieff Morris	PF	United States	Phoenix Suns	Kansas (Jr.)
1	14	Marcus Morris	PF	United States	Houston Rockets	Kansas (Jr.)
1	15	Kawhi Leonard^{*}	SF	United States	Indiana Pacers (traded to San Antonio)^{[B]}	San Diego State (So.)
1	16	Nikola Vučević^{+}	C	Montenegro (Note: Nikola Vučević was born in Switzerland to Yugoslavian parents and raised in Belgium. He holds Montenegrin and Belgian citizenship but represented Montenegro internationally. Vučević became an American citizen in 2024.)	Philadelphia 76ers	USC (Jr.)
1	17	Iman Shumpert	SG	United States	New York Knicks	Georgia Tech (Jr.)
1	18	Chris Singleton	PF	United States	Washington Wizards (from Atlanta)^{[d]}	Florida State (Jr.)
1	19	Tobias Harris	SF	United States	Charlotte Bobcats (from New Orleans via Portland,^{[e]} traded to Milwaukee)^{[A]}	Tennessee (Fr.)
1	20	Donatas Motiejūnas	PF	Lithuania	Minnesota Timberwolves (from Memphis via Utah,^{[f]} traded to Houston)^{[C]}	Benetton Treviso (Italy)
1	21	Nolan Smith	PG	United States	Portland Trail Blazers	Duke (Sr.)
1	22	Kenneth Faried	PF	United States	Denver Nuggets	Morehead State (Sr.)
1	23	Nikola Mirotić	PF	Spain (Note: Nikola Mirotić was born in SR Montenegro, SFR Yugoslavia (now Montenegro) to Montenegrin-Spanish parents. He has represented Spain internationally.)	Houston Rockets (from Orlando via Phoenix,^{[g]} traded to Chicago via Minnesota)^{[C]}^{[D]}	Real Madrid (Spain)
1	24	Reggie Jackson	PG	United States (Note: Reggie Jackson was born in Italy to American parents.)	Oklahoma City Thunder	Boston College (Jr.)
1	25	MarShon Brooks	SG	United States	Boston Celtics (traded to New Jersey)^{[E]}	Providence (Sr.)
1	26	Jordan Hamilton	SG	United States	Dallas Mavericks (traded to Denver)^{[F]}	Texas (So.)
1	27	JaJuan Johnson	PF	United States	New Jersey Nets (from L.A. Lakers,^{[h]} traded to Boston)^{[E]}	Purdue (Sr.)
1	28	Norris Cole	PG	United States	Chicago Bulls (from Miami via Toronto,^{[c]} traded to Miami via Minnesota)^{[D]}^{[G]}	Cleveland State (Sr.)
1	29	Cory Joseph	PG	Canada	San Antonio Spurs	Texas (Fr.)
1	30	Jimmy Butler^{*}	SF/SG	United States	Chicago Bulls	Marquette (Sr.)
2	31	Bojan Bogdanović	SF/PF	Croatia (Note: Bojan Bogdanović was born in SR Bosnia-Herzegovina, SFR Yugoslavia (now Bosnia and Herzegovina), but has represented Croatia internationally.)	Miami Heat (from Minnesota,^{[i]} traded to New Jersey via Minnesota)^{[G]}^{[H]}	Cibona Zagreb (Croatia) (Note: Bojan Bogdanović played for Cibona Zagreb during the 2010–11 season, but was signed by Fenerbahçe Ülker (Turkey) on June 20, 2011.)
2	32	Justin Harper	PF	United States	Cleveland Cavaliers (traded to Orlando)^{[I]}	Richmond (Sr.)
2	33	Kyle Singler	SF	United States	Detroit Pistons (from Toronto)^{[j]}	Duke (Sr.)
2	34	Shelvin Mack	PG	United States	Washington Wizards	Butler (Jr.)
2	35	Tyler Honeycutt	SF	United States	Sacramento Kings	UCLA (So.)
2	36	Jordan Williams	PF	United States	New Jersey Nets	Maryland (So.)
2	37	Trey Thompkins	PF	United States	Los Angeles Clippers (from Detroit)^{[k]}	Georgia (Jr.)
2	38	Chandler Parsons	SF	United States	Houston Rockets (from L.A. Clippers)^{[l]}^{[C]}	Florida (Sr.)
2	39	Jeremy Tyler	PF	United States	Charlotte Bobcats (traded to Golden State)^{[J]}	Tokyo Apache (Japan)
2	40	Jon Leuer	PF	United States	Milwaukee Bucks	Wisconsin (Sr.)
2	41	Darius Morris	PG	United States	Los Angeles Lakers (from Golden State via New Jersey)^{[h]}	Michigan (So.)
2	42	Dāvis Bertāns	SF	Latvia	Indiana Pacers (traded to San Antonio)^{[B]}	Union Olimpija (Slovenia)
2	43	Malcolm Lee	SG	United States	Chicago Bulls (from Utah,^{[m]} traded to Minnesota)^{[D]}	UCLA (Jr.)
2	44	Charles Jenkins	PG	United States	Golden State Warriors (from Phoenix via Chicago)^{[n]}	Hofstra (Sr.)
2	45	Josh Harrellson	C	United States	New Orleans Hornets (from Philadelphia,^{[o]} traded to New York)^{[K]}	Kentucky (Sr.)
2	46	Andrew Goudelock	PG	United States	Los Angeles Lakers (from New York)^{[p]}	College of Charleston (Sr.)
2	47	Travis Leslie	SG	United States	Los Angeles Clippers (from Houston)^{[l]}	Georgia (Jr.)
2	48	Keith Benson	C	United States	Atlanta Hawks	Oakland (Sr.)
2	49	Josh Selby	PG	United States	Memphis Grizzlies	Kansas (Fr.)
2	50	Lavoy Allen	PF	United States	Philadelphia 76ers (from New Orleans)^{[o]}	Temple (Sr.)
2	51	Jon Diebler^{#}	SG	United States	Portland Trail Blazers	Ohio State (Sr.)
2	52	Vernon Macklin	PF	United States	Detroit Pistons (from Denver)^{[q]}	Florida (Sr.)
2	53	DeAndre Liggins	SG	United States	Orlando Magic	Kentucky (Jr.)
2	54	Milan Mačvan^{#}	PF	Serbia (Note: Milan Mačvan was born in SR Croatia, SFR Yugoslavia (now Croatia), but has represented Serbia internationally.)	Cleveland Cavaliers (from Oklahoma City via Miami)^{[r]}	Maccabi Tel Aviv (Israel)
2	55	E'Twaun Moore	SG	United States	Boston Celtics	Purdue (Sr.)
2	56	Chukwudiebere Maduabum^{#}	PF	Nigeria	Los Angeles Lakers (traded to Denver)^{[L]}	Bakersfield Jam (D-League)
2	57	Tanguy Ngombo^{#}	SF	Qatar (Note: Tanguy Ngombo was born in Congo. He is also a naturalized citizen of Qatar and has represented Qatar internationally.)	Dallas Mavericks (traded to Portland)^{[F]}	Al Rayyan (Qatar)
2	58	Ater Majok^{#}	PF	Australia (Note: Ater Majok was born in Sudan and raised in Australia. He is a dual citizen of both countries but represented Australia internationally. He acquired Lebanese citizenship in 2017 and has since played for the Lebanon national basketball team.)	Los Angeles Lakers (from Miami)^{[s]}	Gold Coast Blaze (Australia)
2	59	Ádám Hanga^{#}	SG	Hungary	San Antonio Spurs	Albacomp (Hungary) (Note: Ádám Hanga played for Albacomp during the 2010–11 season, but was signed by Assignia Manresa (Spain) on May 27, 2011.)
2	60	Isaiah Thomas^{*}	PG	United States	Sacramento Kings (from Chicago via Milwaukee)^{[t]}	Washington (Jr.)

== Notable undrafted players ==
These players were not selected in the 2011 NBA draft but have played at least one game in the NBA.

Player	Position	Nationality	School/club team
Dairis Bertāns	SG	Latvia	VEF Rīga (Latvia)
Dwight Buycks	PG	United States	Marquette (Sr.)
Malcolm Delaney	G	United States	Virginia Tech (Sr.)
Zoran Dragić	G/F	Slovenia	KK Krka (Slovenia)
Diante Garrett	G	United States	Iowa State (Sr.)
Ben Hansbrough	G	United States	Notre Dame (Sr.)
Cory Higgins	G	United States	Colorado (Sr.)
Justin Holiday	F	United States	Washington (Sr.)
John Holland	SG	Puerto Rico (Note: Holland was born in the United States to a Puerto Rican mother. He plays for the Puerto Rico national basketball team.)	Boston University (Sr.)
Scotty Hopson	SG	United States	Tennessee (Jr.)
Omari Johnson	F	Jamaica	Oregon State (Sr.)
D. J. Kennedy	G/F	United States	St. John's (Sr.)
Mindaugas Kuzminskas	SF	Lithuania	Žalgiris Kaunas (Lithuania)
Kalin Lucas	PG	United States	Michigan State (Sr.)
Jacob Pullen	PG	United States	Kansas State (Sr.)
Willie Reed	F/C	United States	Saint Louis (So.)
Xavier Silas	G	United States	Northern Illinois (Sr.)
Greg Smith	C	United States	Fresno State (So.)
Alex Stepheson	PF	United States	USC (Sr.)
Julyan Stone	SG	United States	UTEP (Sr.)
Malcolm Thomas	F	United States	San Diego State (Sr.)
Mychel Thompson	F/G	United States	Pepperdine (Sr.)
Brad Wanamaker	SG	United States	Pittsburgh (Sr.)
Chris Wright	F	United States	Dayton (Sr.)
Chris Wright	PG	United States	Georgetown (Sr.)

== Eligibility rules ==
As of 2010, the basic eligibility rules for the draft are listed below.

- All drafted players must be at least 19 years old during the calendar year of the draft. In terms of dates, players eligible for the 2011 draft must be born on or before December 31, 1992.
- Any player who is not an "international player", as defined in the CBA, must be at least one year removed from the graduation of his high school class. The CBA defines "international players" as players who permanently resided outside the U.S. for three years prior to the draft, did not complete high school in the U.S., and have never enrolled at a U.S. college or university.

The basic requirement for automatic eligibility for a U.S. player is the completion of his college eligibility.

Players who meet the CBA definition of "international players" are automatically eligible if their 22nd birthday falls during or before the calendar year of the draft (i.e., born on or before December 31, 1989). U.S. players who were at least one year removed from their high school graduation and have played minor-league basketball with a team outside the NBA are also automatically eligible.

A player who is not automatically eligible must declare his eligibility for the draft by notifying the NBA offices in writing no later than 60 days before the draft. For the 2011 draft, this date fell on April 24. Under NCAA rules, players will only have until May 8 to withdraw from the draft and maintain their college eligibility. This year, a total of 69 collegiate players and 20 international players declared as early entry candidates. At the withdrawal deadline, 41 early entry candidates withdrew from the draft (25 from US colleges and institutions), leaving 42 collegiate players and six international players as the early entry candidates for the draft.

A player who has hired an agent will forfeit his remaining college eligibility, regardless of whether he is drafted. Also, while the CBA allows a player to withdraw from the draft twice, the NCAA mandates that a player who has declared twice loses his college eligibility.

== Draft lottery ==
The first 14 picks in the draft belong to teams that missed the playoffs; the order will be determined through a lottery. The lottery will determine the three teams that will obtain the first three picks on the draft. The remaining first-round picks and the second-round picks were assigned to teams in reverse order of their win–loss record in the previous season. As it is commonplace in the event of identical win–loss records, the NBA performed a random drawing to break the ties on April 15, 2011.

The lottery was held on May 17, 2011, in Secaucus, New Jersey. The Cleveland Cavaliers, who obtained the Los Angeles Clippers' first-round draft pick, won the lottery. The Cavaliers won the lottery with a 22.7% chance to win, combining a 19.9% chance from their own pick and 2.8% chance from the Clippers' pick. However, their winning lottery combination came from the Clippers' pick, which had a significantly lower chance to win. The Minnesota Timberwolves, who had the worst record and the biggest chance to win the lottery, won the second pick. The Utah Jazz, who obtained the New Jersey Nets' first-round draft pick, won the third pick.

Below were the chances for each team to get specific picks in the 2011 draft lottery, rounded to three decimal places.

^	Denotes the actual lottery results

Team	2010–11 record	Lottery chances	Pick													
Team	2010–11 record	Lottery chances	1st	2nd	3rd	4th	5th	6th	7th	8th	9th	10th	11th	12th	13th	14th
Minnesota Timberwolves	17–65	250	.250	.215^	.178	.357	—	—	—	—	—	—	—	—	—	—
Cleveland Cavaliers	19–63	199	.199	.188	.171	.319^	.123	—	—	—	—	—	—	—	—	—
Toronto Raptors	22–60	156	.156	.157	.156	.226	.265^	.040	—	—	—	—	—	—	—	—
Washington Wizards	23–59	119	.119	.126	.133	.099	.351	.161^	.013	—	—	—	—	—	—	—
Sacramento Kings	24–58	76	.076	.084	.095	—	.261	.386	.093^	.004	—	—	—	—	—	—
New Jersey Nets	24–58	75	.075	.083	.094^	—	—	.413	.294	.039	.001	—	—	—	—	—
Detroit Pistons	30–52	43	.043	.049	.058	—	—	—	.599	.232^	.018	.000	—	—	—	—
Los Angeles Clippers	32–50	28	.028^	.033	.039	—	—	—	—	.725	.168	.008	.000	—	—	—
Charlotte Bobcats	34–48	17	.017	.020	.024	—	—	—	—	—	.813^	.122	.004	.000	—	—
Milwaukee Bucks	35–47	11	.011	.013	.016	—	—	—	—	—	—	.870^	.089	.002	.000	—
Golden State Warriors	36–46	8	.008	.009	.012	—	—	—	—	—	—	—	.907^	.063	.001	.000
Utah Jazz	39–43	7	.007	.008	.010	—	—	—	—	—	—	—	—	.935^	.039	.000
Phoenix Suns	40–42	6	.006	.007	.009	—	—	—	—	—	—	—	—	—	.960^	.018
Houston Rockets	43–39	5	.005	.006	.007	—	—	—	—	—	—	—	—	—	—	.982^

1: New Jersey Nets' pick was conveyed to the Utah Jazz.^{[b]}
2: Los Angeles Clippers' pick was conveyed to the Cleveland Cavaliers.^{[a]}

== Entrants ==
=== Early entrants ===
==== College underclassmen ====
(All players are Americans except as indicated)

- Alec Burks – G, Colorado (sophomore)
- DeAngelo Casto – C, Washington State (junior)
- Roscoe Davis – F, Midland JC (TX) (freshman)
- (Mali) Mamadou Diarra – C, Chaminade (junior)
- Jeremy Green – G, Stanford (junior)
- Jordan Hamilton – G/F, Texas (sophomore)
- Tobias Harris – F, Tennessee (freshman)
- Tyler Honeycutt – F, UCLA (sophomore)
- Scotty Hopson – G, Tennessee (junior)
- Kyrie Irving – G, Duke (freshman)
- Reggie Jackson – G, Boston College (junior)
- Terrence Jennings – F, Louisville (junior)
- (Canada) Cory Joseph – G, Texas (freshman)
- (Turkey) Enes Kanter – F/C, Kentucky (freshman)
  - Although Kanter enrolled at Kentucky, he never played because he was declared ineligible by the NCAA due to financial benefits he had received from his previous Turkish club, Fenerbahçe Ülker.
- Ryan Kelley – G, Colorado (sophomore)
- Dan Kelm – G, Viterbo (WI) (sophomore)
- Brandon Knight – G, Kentucky (freshman)
- Malcolm Lee – G, UCLA (junior)
- Kawhi Leonard – F, San Diego State (sophomore)
- Travis Leslie – G, Georgia (junior)
- DeAndre Liggins – G, Kentucky (junior)
- Shelvin Mack – G, Butler (junior)
- Keishawn Mayes – F, Campbell (junior)
- Darius Morris – G, Michigan (sophomore)
- Marcus Morris – F, Kansas (junior)
- Markieff Morris – F, Kansas (junior)
- Willie Reed – F, Saint Louis (junior)
- Jereme Richmond – G/F, Illinois (freshman)
- Carleton Scott – F, Notre Dame (junior)
- Josh Selby – G, Kansas (freshman)
- Iman Shumpert – G, Georgia Tech (junior)
- Chris Singleton – F, Florida State (junior)
- Greg Smith – C, Fresno State (sophomore)
- Isaiah Thomas – G, Washington (junior)
- Trey Thompkins – F, Georgia (junior)
- Klay Thompson – G, Washington State (junior)
- (Canada) Tristan Thompson – F, Texas (freshman)
- (Montenegro) Nikola Vučević – F, USC (junior)
- Kemba Walker – G, Connecticut (junior)
- Antoine Watson – G, Florida International (junior)
- Derrick Williams – F, Arizona (sophomore)
- Jordan Williams – F, Maryland (sophomore)

==== International players ====
This list is restricted to players who meet the CBA definition of "international" players.

- (Latvia) Dāvis Bertāns – F, Olimpija Ljubljana (Slovenia)
- (Democratic Republic of the Congo) Bismack Biyombo – F, Baloncesto Fuenlabrada (Spain)
- Nikola Mirotić – F, Real Madrid (Spain)
- (Lithuania) Donatas Motiejūnas – F, Benetton Treviso (Italy)
- Jonas Valančiūnas – C, Lietuvos Rytas (Lithuania)
- (Czech Republic) Jan Veselý – F, Partizan Belgrade (Serbia)

=== Automatically eligible entrants ===
Players who do not meet the criteria for "international" players are automatically eligible if they meet any of the following criteria:

- They have completed 4 years of their college eligibility.
- If they graduated from high school in the U.S., but did not enroll in a U.S. college or university, four years have passed since their high school class graduated.
- They have signed a contract with a professional basketball team outside of the NBA, anywhere in the world, and have played under that contract.

Players who meet the criteria for "international" players are automatically eligible if they meet any of the following criteria:

- They are least 22 years old during the calendar year of the draft. In terms of dates, players born on or before December 31, 1989, are automatically eligible for the 2011 draft.
- They have signed a contract with a professional basketball team outside of the NBA within the United States, and have played under that contract.

== Invited attendees ==
The 2011 NBA draft is considered to be the 33rd NBA draft to have utilized what is properly considered the "green room" experience for NBA prospects. The NBA's green room is a staging area where anticipated draftees often sit with their families and representatives, waiting for their names to be called on draft night. Often being positioned either in front of or to the side of the podium (in this case, being positioned somewhere within the Prudential Center in Newark, New Jersey for what would later become the final season of the New Jersey Nets under that name), once a player heard his name, he would walk to the podium to shake hands and take promotional photos with the NBA commissioner. From there, the players often conducted interviews with various media outlets while backstage. From there, the players often conducted interviews with various media outlets while backstage. However, once the NBA draft started to air nationally on TV starting with the 1980 NBA draft, the green room evolved from players waiting to hear their name called and then shaking hands with these select players who were often called to the hotel to take promotional pictures with the NBA commissioner a day or two after the draft concluded to having players in real-time waiting to hear their names called up and then shaking hands with David Stern, the NBA's commissioner at the time.

The NBA compiled its list of green room invites through collective voting by the NBA's team presidents and general managers alike, which in this year's case belonged to only what they believed were the top 17 prospects at the time. Despite having a higher number of invites for this year's draft when compared to the previous year's draft following the later invites of Bismack Biyombo and Markieff Morris, there would still be some notable discrepancies involved between the missing invitations at hand for future All-Star Nikola Vučević (the #16 pick) alongside Iman Shumpert (the #17 pick) and Tobias Harris (the #19 pick) for a perfect top 20 draft invite ordered listing alongside invitations being missing for Jimmy Butler and arguably Isaiah Thomas alongside the aforementioned Nikola Vučević missing invitation for future All-Stars at hand for good measure. With that in mind, the following players were invited to attend this year's draft festivities live and in person.

- (Democratic Republic of the Congo) Bismack Biyombo, Baloncesto Fuenlabrada (Spain) [not on the original list; added later]
- (United States) Alec Burks, Colorado
- (United States) Jimmer Fredette, Brigham Young
- (United States) Kyrie Irving, Duke
- (Turkey) / (United States) / (Switzerland) Enes Kanter, Kentucky/Stoneridge Preparatory School (Simi Valley, California)
- (United States) Brandon Knight, Kentucky
- (United States) Kawhi Leonard, San Diego State
- (United States) Marcus Morris, Kansas
- (United States) Markieff Morris, Kansas (not on the original list; added later)
- (Lithuania) Donatas Motiejūnas, Benetton Treviso (Italy)
- (United States) Chris Singleton, Florida State
- (United States) Klay Thompson, Washington State
- (Canada) Tristan Thompson, Texas
- Jonas Valančiūnas, Lietuvos Rytas (Lithuania)
- (Czech Republic) Jan Veselý, Partizan Belgrade (Serbia)
- (United States) Kemba Walker, Connecticut
- (United States) Derrick Williams, Arizona

== Trades involving draft picks ==
=== Pre-draft trades ===
Prior to the day of the draft, the following trades were made and resulted in exchanges of draft picks between the teams.

- ^{a 1} ^{2} On February 24, 2011, the Cleveland Cavaliers acquired Baron Davis and a 2011 first-round draft pick from the Los Angeles Clippers in exchange for Mo Williams and Jamario Moon.
- ^{b 1} ^{2} On February 23, 2011, the Utah Jazz acquired Devin Harris, Derrick Favors, New Jersey's 2011 first-round draft pick and Golden State's 2012 first-round draft pick from the New Jersey Nets in exchange for Deron Williams.
- ^{c 1} ^{2} On February 22, 2011, the Chicago Bulls acquired Miami's 2011 first-round draft pick (the 28th pick) from the Toronto Raptors in exchange for James Johnson. Previously, on July 9, 2010, the Raptors re-acquired their 2011 first-round draft pick (the 5th pick) while also acquiring Miami's 2011 first-round draft pick (the 28th pick) and a trade exception from the Miami Heat in exchange for Chris Bosh. Previously, on February 14, 2009, the Heat acquired Jermaine O'Neal, Jamario Moon, a 2011 first-round draft pick (the 5th pick) and a 2010 second-round draft pick from the Raptors in exchange for Shawn Marion, Marcus Banks and cash considerations.
- ^{d} On February 23, 2011, the Washington Wizards acquired Mike Bibby, Maurice Evans, Jordan Crawford and a 2011 first-round draft pick from the Atlanta Hawks in exchange for Kirk Hinrich and Hilton Armstrong.
- ^{e} On February 23, 2011, the Charlotte Bobcats acquired Joel Przybilla, Dante Cunningham, Sean Marks, New Orleans' 2011 first-round draft pick, Portland's 2013 conditional first-round draft pick and cash considerations from the Portland Trail Blazers in exchange for Gerald Wallace. Previously, on October 23, 2010, the Blazers acquired a 2011 first-round draft pick from the New Orleans Hornets in exchange for Jerryd Bayless.
- ^{f} On July 13, 2010, the Minnesota Timberwolves acquired Kosta Koufos, Memphis's 2011 first-round draft pick and Utah's 2012 conditional first-round draft pick from the Utah Jazz in exchange for Al Jefferson. Previously, on February 18, 2010, the Jazz acquired a 2011 first-round draft pick from the Memphis Grizzlies in exchange for Ronnie Brewer.
- ^{g} On February 24, 2011, the Houston Rockets acquired Goran Dragić and Orlando's 2011 first-round draft pick from the Phoenix Suns in exchange for Aaron Brooks. Previously, on December 18, 2010, the Suns acquired Vince Carter, Marcin Gortat, Mickaël Piétrus, a 2011 first-round draft pick and cash considerations from the Orlando Magic in exchange for Jason Richardson, Hedo Türkoğlu and Earl Clark.
- ^{h 1} ^{2} On December 15, 2010, the New Jersey Nets acquired Sasha Vujačić and a 2011 first-round draft pick from the Los Angeles Lakers, while the Lakers acquired Joe Smith, Golden State's 2011 and Chicago's 2012 second-round draft picks from the Nets in a three-team trade with the Lakers and the Houston Rockets. Previously, the Nets acquired a 2011 second-round draft pick from the Golden State Warriors as a compensation for delaying the sending of the 2011 conditional first-round draft pick to at least 2012. In the original trade on July 22, 2008, the Nets acquired a 2011 conditional first-round draft pick on July 22, 2008, from the Golden State Warriors in exchange for Marcus Williams.
- ^{i} On July 12, 2010, the Miami Heat acquired 2011 and 2014 second-round draft picks and cash considerations from the Minnesota Timberwolves in exchange for Michael Beasley.
- ^{j} On June 15, 2007, the Detroit Pistons acquired 2009 and 2011 second-round draft picks from the Toronto Raptors in exchange for Carlos Delfino.
- ^{k} On February 16, 2009, the Los Angeles Clippers acquired Alex Acker and a 2011 second-round draft pick from the Detroit Pistons in exchange for a 2013 conditional second-round draft pick.
- ^{l 1} ^{2} On August 6, 2008, the Houston Rockets acquired the option to swap 2011 second-round draft picks from the Los Angeles Clippers in exchange for Steve Novak. The option to swap 2011 second-round draft picks was exercised.
- ^{m} On July 8, 2010, the Chicago Bulls acquired Carlos Boozer and a 2011 second-round draft pick from the Utah Jazz in exchange for a trade exception.
- ^{n} On July 22, 2010, the Golden State Warriors acquired Phoenix's 2011 second-round draft pick and a trade exception from the Chicago Bulls in exchange for C. J. Watson. Previously, on July 9, 2010, the Bulls acquired a second-round draft pick from the Phoenix Suns in exchange for Hakim Warrick.
- ^{o 1} ^{2} On September 29, 2010, the New Orleans Hornets acquired Willie Green, Jason Smith and the option to swap 2011 second-round draft picks from the Philadelphia 76ers in exchange for Darius Songaila and Craig Brackins. The option to swap 2011 second-round draft picks was exercised.
- ^{p} On June 26, 2009, the Los Angeles Lakers acquired a 2011 second-round draft pick and cash considerations from the New York Knicks in exchange for the draft rights to Toney Douglas.
- ^{q} On July 13, 2009, the Detroit Pistons acquired a 2011 second-round draft pick from the Denver Nuggets in exchange for Arron Afflalo, Walter Sharpe and cash considerations.
- ^{r} On July 10, 2010, the Cleveland Cavaliers acquired two first-round draft picks, New Orleans' 2012 and Oklahoma City's second-round draft picks, the option to swap 2012 first-round draft picks and a trade exception from the Miami Heat in exchange for LeBron James. Previously, on June 24, 2010, the Heat acquired a 2011 second-round pick from the Oklahoma City Thunder in exchange for the draft rights to Latavious Williams.
- ^{s} On June 26, 2009, the Los Angeles Lakers acquired a 2011 second-round draft pick and cash considerations from the Miami Heat in exchange for the draft rights to Patrick Beverley.
- ^{t} On July 21, 2010, the Sacramento Kings acquired Darnell Jackson and a 2011 second-round draft pick from the Milwaukee Bucks in exchange for Jon Brockman. Previously, on February 18, 2010, the Bucks acquired John Salmons, the option to swap 2010 first-round draft pick, 2011 and 2012 second-round draft picks from the Chicago Bulls in exchange for Hakim Warrick and Joe Alexander.

=== Draft-day trades ===
The following trades involving drafted players were made on the day of the draft.

- ^{A 1} ^{2} ^{3} In a three-team trade, the Charlotte Bobcats acquired Corey Maggette from the Milwaukee Bucks and the draft rights to 7th pick Bismack Biyombo from the Sacramento Kings, the Kings acquired John Salmons and the draft rights to 10th pick Jimmer Fredette from the Bucks, and the Bucks acquired Beno Udrih from the Kings, Stephen Jackson, Shaun Livingston and the draft rights to 19th pick Tobias Harris from the Bobcats.
- ^{B 1} ^{2} The Indiana Pacers acquired George Hill from the San Antonio Spurs in exchange for the draft rights to 15th pick Kawhi Leonard, 42nd pick Dāvis Bertāns and the draft rights to Erazem Lorbek, the 46th pick in 2005.
- ^{C 1} ^{2} ^{3} The Houston Rockets acquired Jonny Flynn, the draft rights to 20th pick Donatas Motiejūnas and a 2012 second-round draft pick from the Minnesota Timberwolves in exchange for Brad Miller, the draft rights to 23rd pick Nikola Mirotić, 38th pick Chandler Parsons and a future first-round draft pick. The Rockets then re-acquired the draft rights to Parsons from the Timberwolves in exchange for cash considerations.
- ^{D 1} ^{2} ^{3} The Chicago Bulls acquired the draft rights to 23rd pick Nikola Mirotić from the Minnesota Timberwolves in exchange for the draft rights to 28th pick Norris Cole, 43rd pick Malcolm Lee and cash considerations.
- ^{E 1} ^{2} The New Jersey Nets acquired the draft rights to 25th pick Marshon Brooks from the Boston Celtics in exchange for the draft rights to 27th pick JaJuan Johnson and a 2014 second-round draft pick.
- ^{F 1} ^{2} In a three-team trade, the Denver Nuggets acquired the draft rights to 26th pick Jordan Hamilton from the Dallas Mavericks, Andre Miller and a future second-round draft pick from the Portland Trail Blazers, the Mavericks acquired Rudy Fernández and the draft rights to Petteri Koponen, the 30th pick in 2007, from the Blazers, and the Blazers acquired Raymond Felton from the Nuggets and the draft rights to 57th pick Tanguy Ngombo from the Mavericks.
- ^{G 1} ^{2} The Miami Heat acquired the draft rights to 28th pick Norris Cole from the Minnesota Timberwolves in exchange for the draft rights to 31st pick Bojan Bogdanović, a 2014 second-round draft pick and cash considerations.
- ^{H} The New Jersey Nets acquired the draft rights to 31st pick Bojan Bogdanović from the Minnesota Timberwolves in exchange for a 2013 second-round draft pick and cash considerations.
- ^{I} The Orlando Magic acquired the draft rights to 32nd pick Justin Harper from the Cleveland Cavaliers in exchange for 2013 and 2014 second-round draft picks.
- ^{J} The Golden State Warriors acquired the draft rights to 39th pick Jeremy Tyler from the Charlotte Bobcats in exchange for cash considerations.
- ^{K} The New York Knicks acquired the draft rights to 45th pick Josh Harrellson from the New Orleans Hornets in exchange for cash considerations.
- ^{L} The Denver Nuggets acquired the draft rights to 56th pick Chukwudiebere Maduabum from the Los Angeles Lakers in exchange for a future second-round draft pick.

== See also ==
- List of first overall NBA draft picks
