= Xavier Silas =

American basketball player and coach (born 1988)

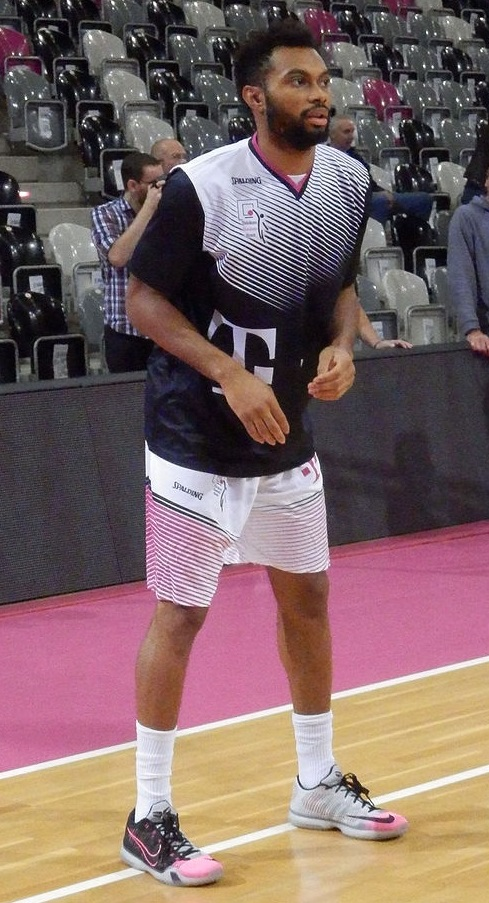
- Silas for Telekom Baskets Bonn in 2015

VMI Keydets
- Title: Associate head coach
- League: Southern Conference

Personal information
- Born: January 22, 1988 (age 38) San Antonio, Texas, U.S.
- Listed height: 6 ft 5 in (1.96 m)
- Listed weight: 202 lb (92 kg)

Career information
- High school: Stephen F. Austin (Austin, Texas); Brewster Academy (Wolfeboro, New Hampshire)
- College: Colorado (2006–2008); Northern Illinois (2009–2011)
- NBA draft: 2011: undrafted
- Playing career: 2011–2019
- Position: Shooting guard / point guard
- Number: 25, 9, 13
- Coaching career: 2019–present

Career history

Playing
- 2011: BCM Gravelines
- 2011–2012: Maine Red Claws
- 2012: Philadelphia 76ers
- 2012–2013: Maine Red Claws
- 2013–2014: Maccabi Ashdod
- 2014: Quimsa
- 2015: Nea Kifissia
- 2015: Telekom Baskets Bonn
- 2015: San Lorenzo de Almagro
- 2016–2018: Bakersfield Jam / Northern Arizona Suns
- 2018: Boston Celtics
- 2018–2019: Iowa Wolves

Coaching
- 2019–2021: Delaware Blue Coats (assistant)
- 2021–2022: Motor City Cruise (assistant)
- 2022–2023: Mets de Guaynabo
- 2024: VMI (assistant)
- 2024-present: VMI (AHC)

Career highlights
- First-team All-MAC (2011)
- Stats at NBA.com
- Stats at Basketball Reference

Xavier James Silas (born January 22, 1988) is an American basketball coach and former player who is currently the associate head coach at the Virginia Military Institute. He played college basketball for the Colorado Buffaloes and Northern Illinois Huskies.

== High school and college career ==
Silas grew up in Austin, Texas, where he attended Stephen F. Austin High School before moving to Wolfeboro, New Hampshire, to attend Brewster Academy for a postgraduate year. In 2005–06, he averaged 12.8 points and 4.0 rebounds per game for Brewster Academy.

After playing two seasons for Colorado, Silas transferred to Northern Illinois in 2008 and subsequently sat out the 2008–09 season due to NCAA transfer regulations. As a senior for Northern Illinois in 2010–11, Silas was named to the All-Mid-American Conference first team after he averaged 22.3 points (1st in the MAC) and 4.6 rebounds per game.

== Professional career ==
=== 2011–12 season ===
Silas went undrafted in the 2011 NBA draft. On September 16, 2011, he signed a one-year deal with BCM Gravelines of the LNB Pro A. In early December 2011, he left France and returned to the United States.

On December 9, 2011, he signed with the Philadelphia 76ers. However, he was later waived by the 76ers on December 20, 2011. A week later, he was acquired by the Maine Red Claws. On April 24, 2012, he signed with the 76ers for the rest of the season.

=== 2012–13 season ===
In July 2012, Silas joined the Philadelphia 76ers for the 2012 NBA Summer League. In the 76ers' final summer league game against the Detroit Pistons, Silas left the game after he was inadvertently elbowed in the head by teammate Solomon Jones. Silas went down with a concussion, and the Sixers initially feared a skull fracture. He subsequently required surgery on several sinus fractures.

On September 27, 2012, he re-signed with the 76ers. However, he was later waived on October 10, 2012. On November 1, 2012, he was reacquired by the Maine Red Claws. On February 18, 2013, he was deactivated by the Red Claws and stayed that way for the rest of the season.

=== 2013–14 season ===
In July 2013, Silas joined the Milwaukee Bucks for the 2013 NBA Summer League. On September 27, 2013, he signed with the Washington Wizards. However, he was later waived by the Wizards on October 24, 2013. On November 4, 2013, the Maine Red Claws traded Silas' rights to the Fort Wayne Mad Ants.

On November 17, 2013, he signed with Maccabi Ashdod of Israel for the rest of the 2013–14 season. On January 16, 2014, he left Maccabi after just nine games. On February 11, 2014, he signed with Quimsa of Argentina for the rest of the season.

=== 2014–15 season ===
On September 29, 2014, Silas signed with the Washington Wizards. However, he was later waived by the Wizards on October 25, 2014. On January 7, 2015, he signed with Nea Kifissia of Greece for the rest of the season.

=== 2015–16 season ===
On August 25, 2015, Silas signed with Telekom Baskets Bonn of Germany for the 2015–16 season. On November 12, he parted ways with Telekom Bonn after appearing in five league games and four Eurocup games.

On November 19, Silas signed with San Lorenzo de Almagro of the Argentine Liga Nacional de Básquet. On December 23, he parted ways with San Lorenzo after averaging 12.4 points and 3.7 rebounds in seven games.

On January 14, 2016, Silas was acquired by the Bakersfield Jam of the NBA Development League. That night, he made his debut for the Jam in a 105–100 loss to the Austin Spurs, recording six points in 19 minutes off the bench.

=== 2016–17 season ===
After being inactive for seven games, Silas made his debut with the Northern Arizona Suns (the new name for the Bakersfield Jam) on December 3, 2016, against the Reno Bighorns.

On April 6, 2017, Silas signed with the Hunan Yongsheng of China for the 2017 NBL season. However, he did not join the Chinese club.

=== 2017–18 season ===
After concluding his season with the BIG3 (a 3-on-3 basketball league created by Ice Cube), Silas returned to the Northern Arizona Suns once again on October 24, 2017. On March 27, 2018, after the conclusion of the first NBA G League season, the Boston Celtics announced that they had signed Silas to a 10-day contract after the team granted hardship exception from the league. The Celtics did not resign him after the contract expired.

=== 2018–19 season ===
Silas signed with the Denver Nuggets to a training camp contract but was waived on October 13, 2018. Silas was added to the Iowa Wolves opening night roster.

=== BIG3 ===
On April 30, 2017, Silas was drafted as the 4th overall pick in the inaugural draft for the BIG3 basketball league by Tri State. Silas played three games with Tri State before being traded to the Ball Hogs on July 13, 2017, in exchange for Dominic McGuire.

== Coaching career ==
For the 2019–20 season, Silas joined the coaching staff for the NBA G League's Delaware Blue Coats as an assistant.

Before the 2021–22 season, Silas became an assistant coach for the Motor City Cruise.

In January 2024, after a brief coaching stint in the BSN, the highest professional basketball league in Puerto Rico, Silas was hired to be an assistant coach for the Virginia Military Institute (VMI). Following the conclusion of the 2024-25 season, he was promoted to associate head coach.

== Personal life ==
Silas is the son of James and Vanessa Silas, and has six brothers and one sister. His father was a two-time All-American at Stephen F. Austin and played 328 games in four seasons in the American Basketball Association (ABA), where he averaged 18.2 points, 4.3 assists and 4.0 rebounds per game. He also played six seasons in the NBA for the San Antonio Spurs after the ABA–NBA merger and one for the Cleveland Cavaliers, averaging 14.2 points per game.

== Career statistics ==
Legend
GP	Games played	GS	Games started	MPG	Minutes per game
FG%	Field goal percentage	3P%	3-point field goal percentage	FT%	Free throw percentage
RPG	Rebounds per game	APG	Assists per game	SPG	Steals per game
BPG	Blocks per game	PPG	Points per game	**Bold**	Career high

=== NBA ===
==== Regular season ====
Year	Team	GP	GS	MPG	FG%	3P%	FT%	RPG	APG	SPG	BPG	PPG
2011–12	Philadelphia	**2**	0	**19.4**	**.267**	**.167**	**.667**	**2.0**	**1.5**	.0	.0	**5.5**
2017–18	Boston	**2**	0	3.7	.000	.000	–	1.0	.0	**.5**	.0	.0
Career		4	0	11.5	.222	.125	.667	1.5	.8	.3	.0	2.8

==== Playoffs ====
Year	Team	GP	GS	MPG	FG%	3P%	FT%	RPG	APG	SPG	BPG	PPG
2012	Philadelphia	2	0	2.0	1.000	.000	.000	1.0	.0	.0	.0	1.0
