= Lavoy Allen =

American basketball player (born 1989)

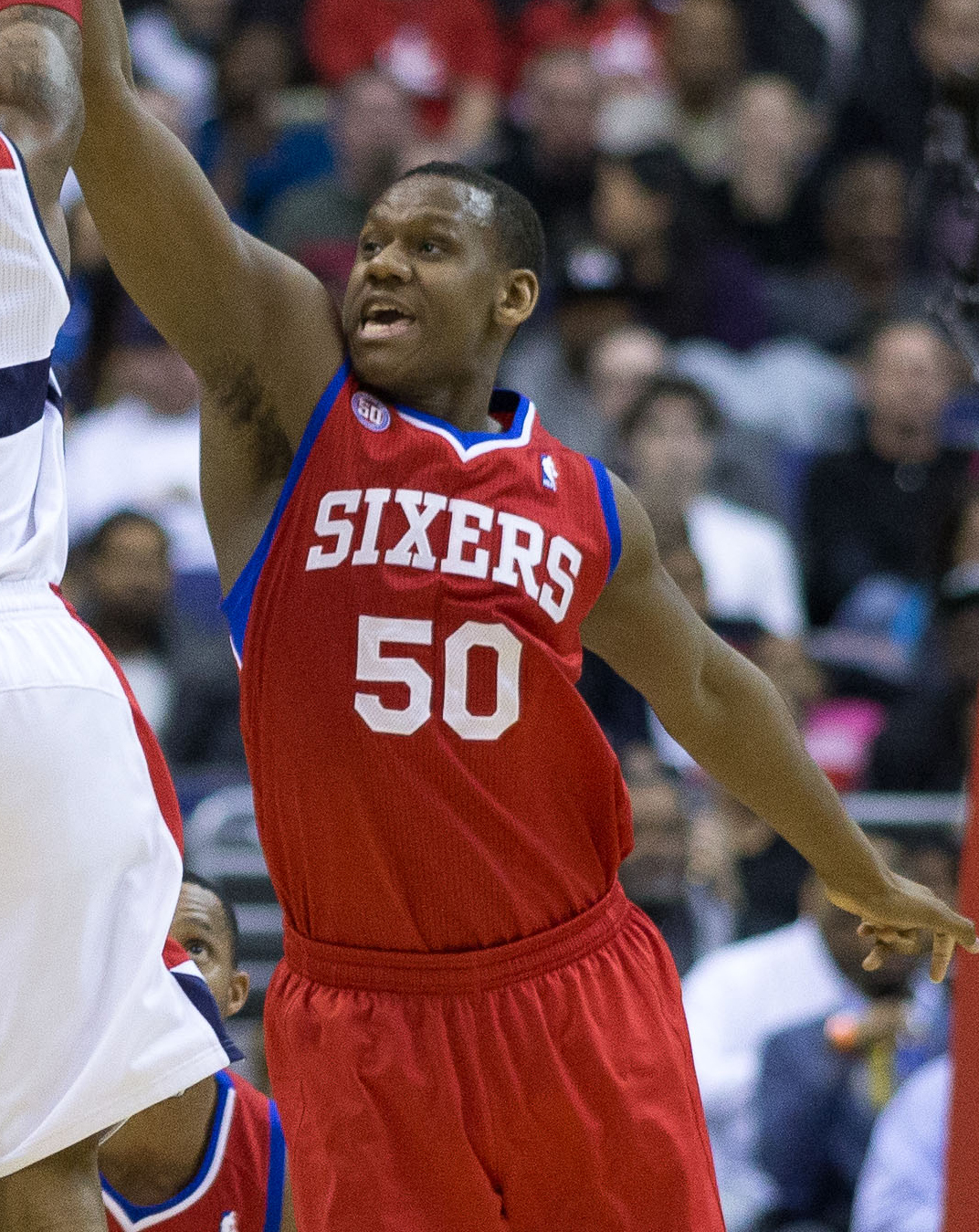
- Allen with the Philadelphia 76ers in 2013

Personal information
- Born: February 4, 1989 (age 37) Trenton, New Jersey, U.S.
- Listed height: 6 ft 9 in (2.06 m)
- Listed weight: 260 lb (118 kg)

Career information
- High school: Pennsbury (Fairless Hills, Pennsylvania)
- College: Temple (2007–2011)
- NBA draft: 2011: 2nd round, 50th overall pick
- Drafted by: Philadelphia 76ers
- Playing career: 2011–2019
- Position: Power forward / center
- Number: 50, 5

Career history
- 2011: Strasbourg IG
- 2011–2014: Philadelphia 76ers
- 2014–2017: Indiana Pacers
- 2018: Northern Arizona Suns
- 2018–2019: Capital City Go-Go

Career highlights
- Robert V. Geasey Trophy winner (2011); 2× First-team All-Atlantic 10 (2010, 2011); Third-team All-Atlantic 10 (2009)
- Stats at NBA.com
- Stats at Basketball Reference

Lavoy Allen (born February 4, 1989) is an American former professional basketball player. He was selected in the second round, 50th overall pick in the 2011 NBA draft by the Philadelphia 76ers. Allen is the son of a truck driver, and did not play much basketball until eighth grade. He attended Pennsbury High School, where he was coached by Oliver Aaron. Rivals.com ranked him the 14th best center in his class, and Scout.com named him the 110th overall prospect. Allen committed to Temple University and coach Fran Dunphy.

Temple reached the NCAA tournament in all four seasons that Allen played there. He was a three-time All-Atlantic 10 Defensive Team honoree and a two-time All-Atlantic 10 First Team recipient. In his junior year, he became the first Temple player to average a double-double since Ollie Johnson accomplished the feat in 1970–71. Allen declared for early entry in the 2010 NBA draft, but withdrew prior to the May 8 deadline. As a senior, Allen surpassed Johnny Baum as the all-time leading rebounder in Temple history. He was the recipient of the Robert V. Geasey Trophy honoring the Philadelphia Big Five Player of the Year. Dunphy has said that Allen "might be the smartest player I've ever coached."

== Early life ==
Allen was born in Trenton, New Jersey on February 4, 1989. His mother is Paula Allen and his father, Dave Allen, is a truck driver. When he was nine years old, Lavoy moved to Morrisville, Pennsylvania, and struggled to make friends in his new surroundings. He did not play much organized basketball until eighth grade. In an interview, Allen admitted he was not very good in the beginning, and focused on passing the ball to a better teammate. His initial motivation was how schoolchildren mocked him for his height yet not being able to dunk. "I could barely jump over the Sunday paper," he said.

== High school career ==
He attended Pennsbury High School, where he was coached by Frank Sciolla. Former Temple player Dalton Pepper was his high school teammate. In ninth grade, Allen decided that he wanted to be great, and put in much more practice time. He became a starter on the varsity team in his sophomore year. As a junior, he averaged 12 points and nine rebounds per game, and was named a Top 150 player in his class by Hoop Scoop.

In his senior season, Allen posted per-game averages of 13 points, 9.6 rebounds, 3.2 assists, 3 blocks, and 2 steals. Under Allen, Pennsbury reached the second round of the PIAA playoffs before losing to Harrisburg High School. He was named to the Second Team all-Southeastern Pennsylvania at the conclusion of the season. Allen tried out for the USA U-19 basketball team, but did not make the final cut. Rivals.com ranked him the 14th best center in his class, and Scout.com named him the 110th overall prospect. He worked at a day care facility to earn enough money to bring his date to the senior prom. On November 8, 2006, Allen committed to Temple, over Division I scholarship offers from Rutgers, Saint Joseph's, and La Salle. Along with Dayton signee Chris Wright, Allen was one of two ESPN 100 prospects in the class of 2008 to sign with an Atlantic 10 program.

College recruiting
Name	Hometown	School	Height	Weight	Commit date
Lavoy Allen; Center	Morrisville, Bucks County, Pennsylvania	Pennsbury (PA)	6 ft 9 in (2.06 m)	215 lb (98 kg)	Aug 11, 2006
Lavoy Allen; Center	Recruit ratings: Scout: Rivals:				
Overall recruit ranking: Scout: 110 Rivals: 14 (C)
Note: In many cases, Scout, Rivals, 247Sports, On3, and ESPN may conflict in their listings of height and weight.; In these cases, the average was taken. ESPN grades are on a 100-point scale.; Sources: "Temple Basketball Commitments". Rivals.; "2007 Temple Basketball Commits". Scout.; "Scout.com Team Recruiting Rankings". Scout.; "2007 Team Ranking". Rivals.

== College career ==
=== Freshman ===
Coming into his freshman season, Allen was selected to the Preseason All-Atlantic 10 Rookie Team. He was seen as an answer for Temple's rebounding and interior scoring struggles from the previous 12–18 season. In his first college basketball game, Allen scored eight points and grabbed nine rebounds in a loss to #7 Tennessee. From November 18 through December 9, 2007, he scored in double figures in six consecutive games. On February 10, 2008, Allen's season-high 20 points led Temple to an 80–70 overtime victory over the UMass Minutemen. Allen was benched in the February 17 game against Dayton due to missing a study assignment.

The Owls finished the season 21–13, and made the NCAA tournament for the first time since 2001, receiving a 12 seed by the selection committee. In the first round, they bowed out to fifth-seeded Michigan State 72–61. In that game, Allen notched his first double-double of 13 points and 11 rebounds, and also drained his first two collegiate three-pointers. He led the team in blocks with a total of 52, and finished second in field goal percentage (.558), third in rebounds per game (5.7), and fourth in points per game (8.1). Allen was selected to the All-Atlantic 10 Rookie Team.

=== Sophomore ===
As a sophomore, Allen increased his scoring average to 10.9 points per game, second on the team, and again led the team in blocks with 1.56 per game. He shot a team-best .579 from the floor, and his .618 field goal percentage in league games led the Atlantic 10. In addition, he led the team and finished third in the Atlantic 10 in rebounding with 9.0 rebounds per game. He had 14 double-doubles on the season. In the Owls' game against Lafayette, Allen broke his thumb and was forced to miss the next game against Buffalo. His season-high 23 points came on February 8, when the Owls defeated the Rhode Island Rams 68–62; Allen also had 13 rebounds. The following day, Allen received his first Philadelphia Big 5 player of the week honors. He would again be honored as Big 5 player of the week on February 23, following a 20-point and season-high 18 rebound performance against St. Bonaventure.

At the end of the regular season, Allen was named to the All-Atlantic 10 Third Team and All-Atlantic 10 Defensive Team. He helped Temple to its second consecutive Atlantic 10 Tournament title and NCAA Tournament appearance. In the championship game over Duquesne, Allen contributed 10 points and 14 rebounds. He posted 10 points and 11 rebounds against Arizona State in a 2009 NCAA tournament round of 64 loss.

=== Junior ===
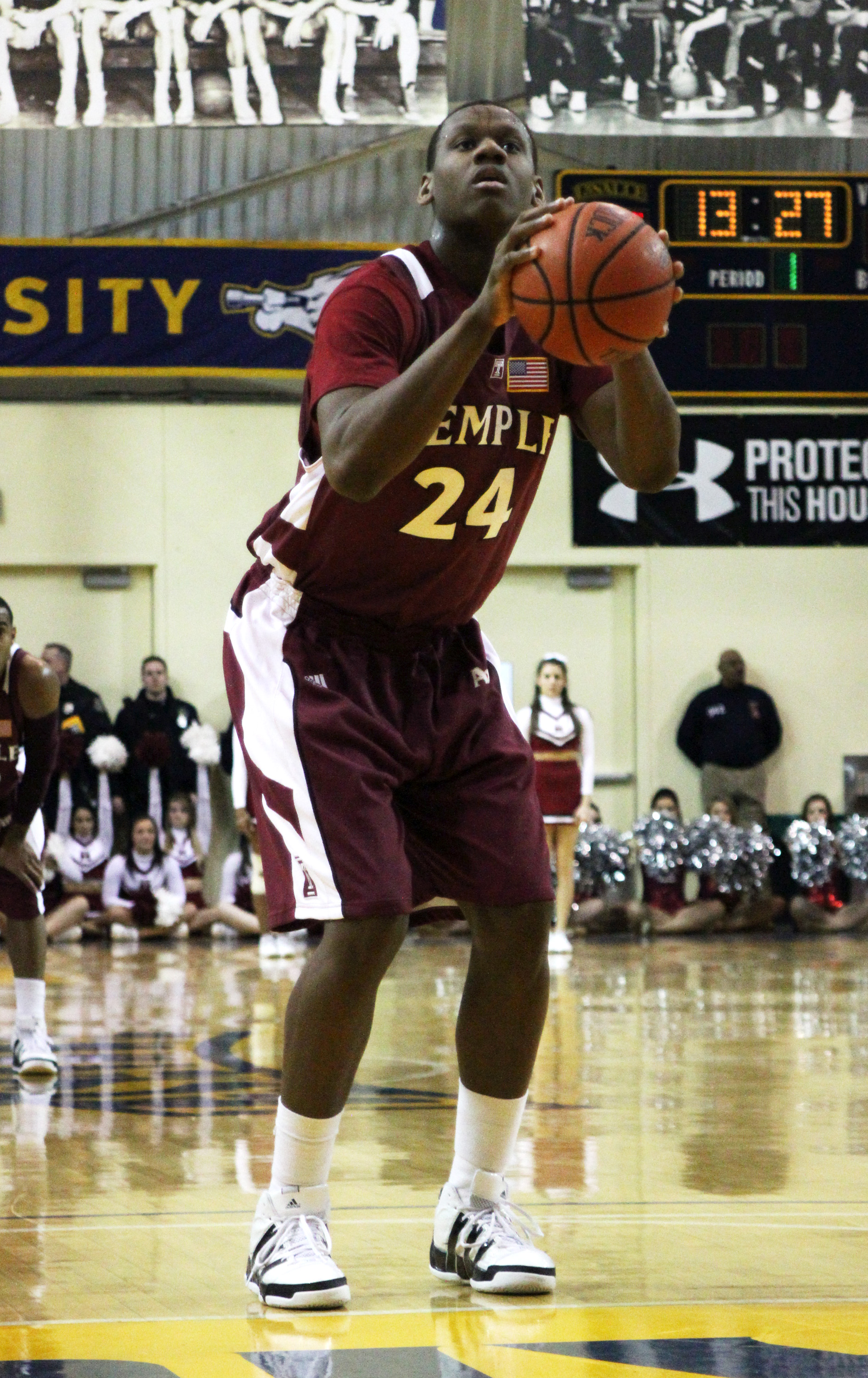
Allen attempts a free throw on February 28, 2010, with Temple.

Allen was a Preseason All-Atlantic 10 First Team selection in his junior year. He averaged 11.5 points and 10.7 rebounds per game, becoming the first Temple player to average a double-double since Ollie Johnson accomplished the feat in 1970–71. Allen's 10.9 rebounds per game average in Atlantic 10 conference games was bested only by Fordham's Chris Gaston and Duquesne's Damian Saunders. In addition, he led Temple in field goal percentage at .536. He scored 10 points and snatched 17 rebounds in the Owls' upset of #3 Villanova on December 19. In a 65–53 win over La Salle on February 28, 2010, Allen scored 17 points and grabbed 21 rebounds, a career high and the most by an Owl since Joe Newman pulled down 24 on February 5, 1973. With the victory, Temple clinched the Philadelphia Big Five title with a perfect 4–0 record. Allen became the 46th Temple player to score 1,000 points in his career in a game against George Washington. This earned him Atlantic 10 (co-)player of the week honors for the week of March 7.

Led by Allen, Temple enjoyed a 29–5 season, captured a share of the Atlantic 10 conference regular season championship with a 14–2 record, and culminated in a third consecutive Atlantic 10 conference tournament title and an automatic bid to the NCAA tournament. In the NCAA Tournament, Temple was seeded fifth and matched up with 12 seed Cornell in the first round. Allen had 11 points, but his Owls were upset by the Big Red 78–65. Following the season, Allen was selected to the All-Atlantic 10 First Team and All-Atlantic 10 Defensive Team. He was recognized as an All-Fourth District first-team selection by the National Association of Basketball Coaches making him eligible for the State Farm Division I All-America teams. Since the Atlantic 10 Conference was its own district, this is equivalent to being named first team All-Atlantic 10 by the NABC. The U.S. Basketball Writers Association named Allen to the 10-man All-District II team covering college basketball players in the states of New York, New Jersey, Delaware. the District of Columbia, Pennsylvania, and West Virginia.

Allen briefly flirted with the 2010 NBA draft. He declared for early entry in the draft, but did not hire an agent. After one workout with the Portland Trail Blazers, Allen was told to return to school to work on his offensive game. On May 8, Allen officially pulled his name out of consideration for the draft. He did so on the final day allowed by the NCAA to ensure collegiate eligibility.

=== Senior ===
Allen was named to the 20-man USA Select team, which played with and against the USA National team from July 19-24. Prior to his senior campaign, he was on the preseason John R. Wooden Award and Naismith College Player of the Year watchlists. He was a preseason All-Atlantic 10 First Team and Defensive Team selection. On December 6, Allen was named Atlantic 10 co-player of the week after recording back-to-back double-doubles against Central Michigan and Maryland, both Temple victories. He sprained his ankle in a game against Fordham on February 9, 2011, and was forced to miss the following game versus the Dayton Flyers. In the February 20 game against Saint Joseph's, Allen became Temple's all-time leader in rebounds. Allen snatched 12 boards to pass Temple radio analyst Johnny Baum's career 1,042 rebounds. He received conference player of the week honors for the week of February 28. Allen scored a career-high 24 points to top La Salle in the regular season finale, earning him Atlantic 10 Player of the Week recognition on March 6.

Temple finished with a 26–8 record in Allen's senior season and earned a berth to the 2011 NCAA Division I men's basketball tournament. This time, they defeated Penn State in the round of 64 before falling to San Diego State in double overtime. Allen had 12 points and 11 rebounds in his final game as a Temple Owl. He was named to the All-Atlantic 10 First Team and Defensive Team at the conclusion of the regular season. Allen was the recipient of the Robert V. Geasey Trophy honoring the Philadelphia Big Five Player of the Year.

Behind Chris Gaston of Fordham, Allen finished second in conference in rebounding average with an 8.4 mark in league play, and was fifth in the Atlantic 10 in blocks. In addition, he averaged 11.6 points per game, second on the team. For his career, he pulled down 1,147 rebounds and scored 1,421 points, 24th in Temple history. Temple coach Fran Dunphy has said that Allen "might be the smartest player I've ever coached in terms of positioning and understanding the game – just his knowledge."

=== College statistics ===
Year	Team	GP	GS	MPG	FG%	3P%	FT%	RPG	APG	SPG	BPG	PPG
2007–08	Temple Owls	34	32	29.2	.558	.400	.737	5.7	1.6	0.5	1.5	8.1
2008–09	Temple Owls	33	31	31.3	.579	.333	.642	9.0	2.1	0.4	1.5	10.9
2009–10	Temple Owls	35	34	34.5	.536	.217	.625	10.7	2.4	0.5	1.4	11.5
2010–11	Temple Owls	33	33	33.9	.480	.294	.697	8.6	2.3	0.7	1.8	11.6

== Professional career ==
=== 2011 NBA draft ===
On April 1, 2011, Allen participated in the 2011 Reese's College All-Star Game held at the Reliant Center in Houston, Texas. He contributed 11 points and eight rebounds as his East team lost to the West 113–108. Chad Ford of ESPN said that Allen was the 99th best prospect in the 2011 NBA draft. Allen sprained his ankle in a workout with his hometown Philadelphia 76ers and was forced to miss the next workout with the New Jersey Nets. The Sixers were not overly concerned with the injury, as they drafted him in the second round with the 50th pick on June 23. Allen became the 32nd Temple product to be drafted and the first since the New York Knicks selected Mardy Collins with the 29th pick in 2006.

=== Strasbourg IG (2011) ===
On July 15, 2011, he signed a contract with Strasbourg IG of France's LNB Pro A. The contract included an opt-out clause when the NBA settled its lockout, set to expire on January 30, 2012. Allen joined former Richmond foes Kevin Anderson and Justin Harper on Strasbourg IG. He made his debut on October 7, scoring 10 points and pulling down four rebounds in a 77–74 victory over Cholet Basket. The following game, against SLUC Nancy Basket, he grabbed a season-high 13 rebounds and also added 12 points. Allen's season-high 19 points came on November 10, when Strasbourg IG defeated Chorale Roanne Basket 93–80. In nine games, Allen averaged 10.1 points and 7.2 rebounds per game.

=== Philadelphia 76ers (2011–2014) ===
==== Rookie season ====
When the NBA ended its lockout, Allen opted-out of his French contract to sign a contract with the Philadelphia 76ers on December 9, the first day of training camp. Allen made his NBA debut during the 76ers' 97–62 win over the Toronto Raptors on January 7, 2012, and grabbed two rebounds. He first saw significant playing time on the January 23 game against the Washington Wizards due to injuries to centers Spencer Hawes and Nikola Vucevic. Allen responded by scoring 10 points on 5–5 shooting and pulling down six rebounds en route to a 103–83 victory. He recorded a season-high 15 points on February 1 against the Chicago Bulls, and a season-high 12 rebounds against the Milwaukee Bucks on April 25. In 41 regular season games and 15 as a starter, Allen averaged 4.1 points and 4.2 rebounds per game.

Allen raised his averages in the playoffs to 6.3 points and 4.9 rebounds per game. Coach Doug Collins named him the starting center in the playoff opener against the Bulls. In his first playoff game, Allen sprained his thumb, but the injury was not considered severe. In Game 2 of the series, he nearly posted a double double with 11 points and nine rebounds. The 76ers advanced past the Bulls to face the Boston Celtics in the conference semifinals. Allen hit the "shot of [his] life" to help the 76ers defeat the Celtics 82–81 in the second game of the series. With the score tied and four minutes left, Andre Iguodala passed the ball to Allen, who hit a 22-foot jumper as the shot clock expired. He earned his postseason minutes partially because of his ability to guard Celtics star Kevin Garnett. The Sixers pushed the series to seven games, but ultimately lost to the Celtics.

==== 2012–13 season ====
On July 11, 2012, Allen re-signed with the Philadelphia 76ers to a reported two-year, $6 million contract. He missed two days of training camp to attend to his girlfriend, who gave birth to his son Kai on October 4. He started the majority of games for the 76ers in his sophomore season at center due to the absence of Andrew Bynum. Allen averaged 5.8 points and 5.0 rebounds in his second season with the 76ers.

==== 2013–14 season ====
Allen missed an exhibition game due to a knee injury. He was criticized for missing a practice in October 2013 due to oversleeping. He mainly played backup power forward during the season. Allen missed four games in January 2014 due to a strained right calf. In 51 games, Allen posted averages of 5.2 points and 5.4 rebounds per game.

=== Indiana Pacers (2014–2017) ===
On February 20, 2014, Allen and Evan Turner were traded to the Indiana Pacers in exchange for Danny Granger and a second-round draft pick. In eight minutes per game, Allen averaged 2.9 points and 2.4 rebounds per game. Allen scored 13 points in a match against the 76ers on March 14 and contributed 12 points and 11 rebounds last game of the regular season versus the Orlando Magic. He married in the summer of 2014.

On July 11, 2014, Allen re-signed with the Pacers. He was most effective earlier in the season due to injuries of other players. He missed a January 31, 2015, game against the Sacramento Kings due to a sore knee. Allen mainly played as a backup power forward and averaged 5.0 points and 5.1 rebounds in his first full season with the Pacers and was the Pacers' most active offensive rebounder.

On July 27, 2015, Allen re-signed once again with the Pacers.

In Game 2 of the 2017 NBA playoffs versus the Cleveland Cavaliers, Allen inscribed "Go Pacers" on the Cavaliers' home court. In June 2017, the Pacers declined the $3.5 million team option for Allen, which made him an unrestricted free agent.

=== Northern Arizona Suns (2018) ===
Allen signed with the Zhejiang Golden Bulls in China in November 2017 but never joined the team. In February 2018 he was picked up by the Northern Arizona Suns of the NBA G League. In his second game on February 11, Allen had 14 points and 12 rebounds. He followed up this performance with 12 points and 12 rebounds the next game. On the season, Allen averaged 9.0 points, 6.3 rebounds and 2.4 assists per game, shooting 58.2 percent from the field.

=== Capital City Go-Go (2018–2019) ===
On August 22, 2018, Allen was selected by the Capital City Go-Go of the G League in the 2018 expansion draft. On September 20, 2018, the Washington Wizards signed Allen for training camp. He was waived by the Wizards on October 14, but he was added to the roster of the Wizards’ G League affiliate, the Capital City Go-Go.

== NBA career statistics ==
Legend
GP	Games played	GS	Games started	MPG	Minutes per game
FG%	Field goal percentage	3P%	3-point field goal percentage	FT%	Free throw percentage
RPG	Rebounds per game	APG	Assists per game	SPG	Steals per game
BPG	Blocks per game	PPG	Points per game	**Bold**	Career high

=== Regular season ===
Year	Team	GP	GS	MPG	FG%	3P%	FT%	RPG	APG	SPG	BPG	PPG
2011–12	Philadelphia	41	15	15.2	.473	.000	**.786**	4.2	.8	.3	.4	4.1
2012–13	Philadelphia	**79**	**37**	**21.1**	.454	.000	.717	5.0	.9	.3	**.7**	**5.8**
2013–14	Philadelphia	51	2	18.8	.440	**.154**	.675	**5.4**	**1.3**	**.4**	.5	5.2
2013–14	Indiana	14	0	8.0	.500	.000	.600	2.4	.4	.1	.4	2.9
2014–15	Indiana	63	0	17.0	.472	.000	.702	5.1	1.2	.2	**.7**	5.0
2015–16	Indiana	**79**	28	20.2	**.516**	.000	.630	**5.4**	1.0	.3	.5	5.4
2016–17	Indiana	61	5	14.3	.458	.000	.697	3.6	.9	.3	.4	2.9
Career		388	87	17.8	.471	.133	.682	4.8	1.0	.3	.6	4.8

=== Playoffs ===
Year	Team	GP	GS	MPG	FG%	3P%	FT%	RPG	APG	SPG	BPG	PPG
2012	Philadelphia	**12**	1	**19.7**	**.557**	.000	**.583**	**4.9**	**.3**	**.8**	**.9**	**6.3**
2014	Indiana	4	0	3.8	.500	.000	.000	1.3	**.3**	.0	.0	1.0
2016	Indiana	6	**3**	8.5	.300	.000	.000	2.3	**.3**	.2	.2	1.0
Career		22	4	13.7	.520	.000	.583	3.5	.3	.5	.5	3.9
