= Craig Brackins =

American basketball player (born 1987)

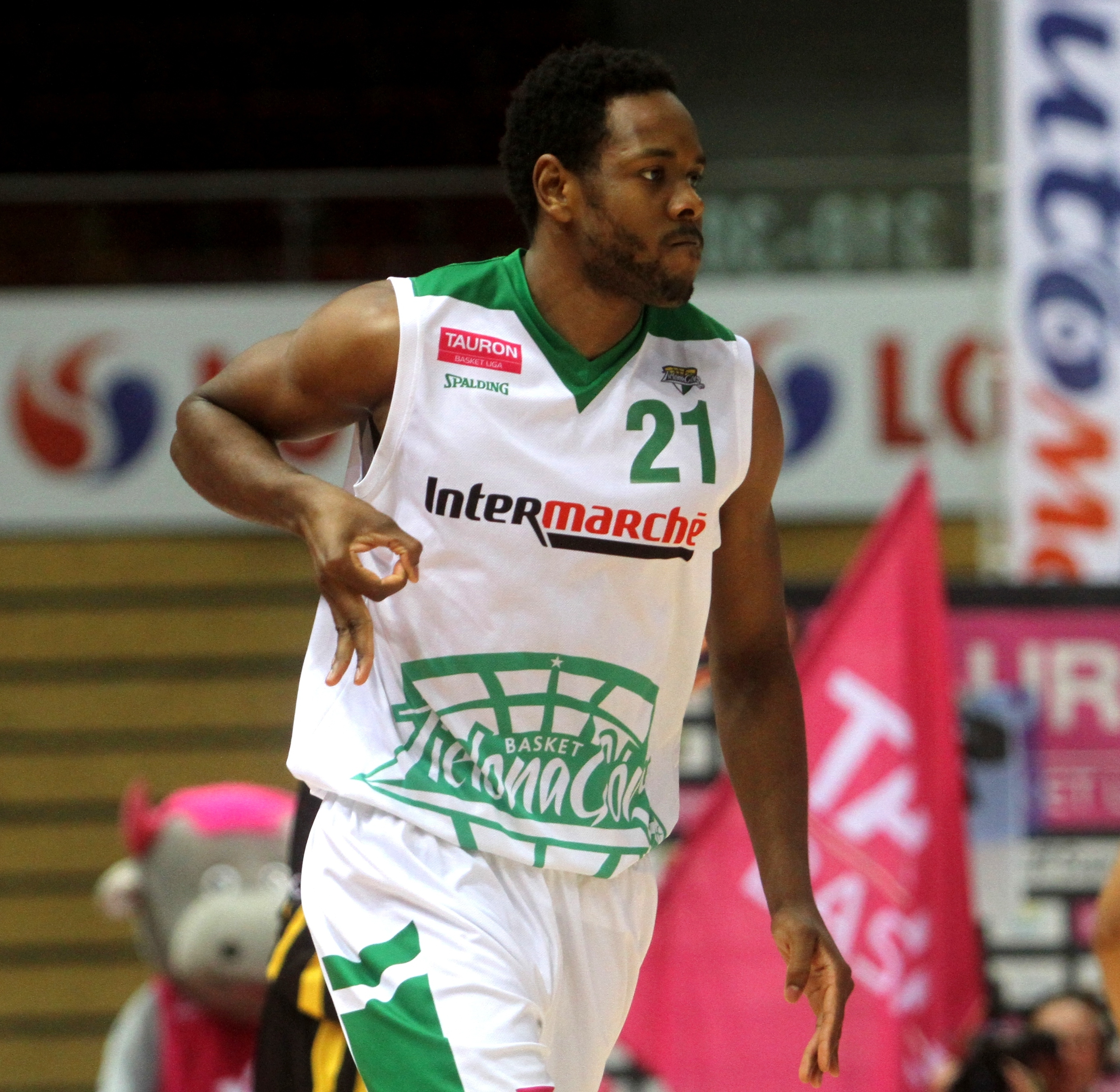
- Brackins with Stelmet Zielona Góra in 2014

Personal information
- Born: October 9, 1987 (age 39) Los Angeles, California, U.S.
- Listed height: 6 ft 10 in (2.08 m)
- Listed weight: 230 lb (104 kg)

Career information
- High school: Brewster Academy (Wolfeboro, New Hampshire)
- College: Iowa State (2007–2010)
- NBA draft: 2010: 1st round, 21st overall pick
- Drafted by: Oklahoma City Thunder
- Playing career: 2010–2022
- Position: Power forward

Career history
- 2010–2012: Philadelphia 76ers
- 2010–2011: →Springfield Armor
- 2012: →Maine Red Claws
- 2011: Maccabi Ashdod
- 2012: Angelico Biella
- 2013: Los Angeles D-Fenders
- 2013–2014: Stelmet Zielona Góra
- 2014–2015: Eskişehir Basket
- 2015–2016: Viola Reggio Calabria
- 2016: Jiangsu Hualan
- 2017: Shiga Lakestars
- 2017–2019: Nagoya Diamond Dolphins
- 2019–2020: Shiga Lakestars
- 2020–2022: Koshigaya Alphas

Career highlights
- First-team All-Big 12 (2009)
- Stats at NBA.com
- Stats at Basketball Reference
Medals
Men's basketball
Representing United States
Summer Universiade
Bronze medal – third place	2009 Belgrade	National team

Craig Lee Brackins (born October 9, 1987) is an American former professional basketball player.

Brackins played collegiately for the Iowa State Cyclones. A power forward, Brackins was the highest-touted recruit to choose Iowa State after spending time at Brewster Academy in New Hampshire. In March 2009, Brackins was predicted to be a first-round draft pick in the 2009 NBA draft. He was picked by the Oklahoma City Thunder with the 21st overall pick in the 2010 NBA draft. He was immediately traded to the New Orleans Hornets, and he was later traded to the Philadelphia 76ers.

== College career ==
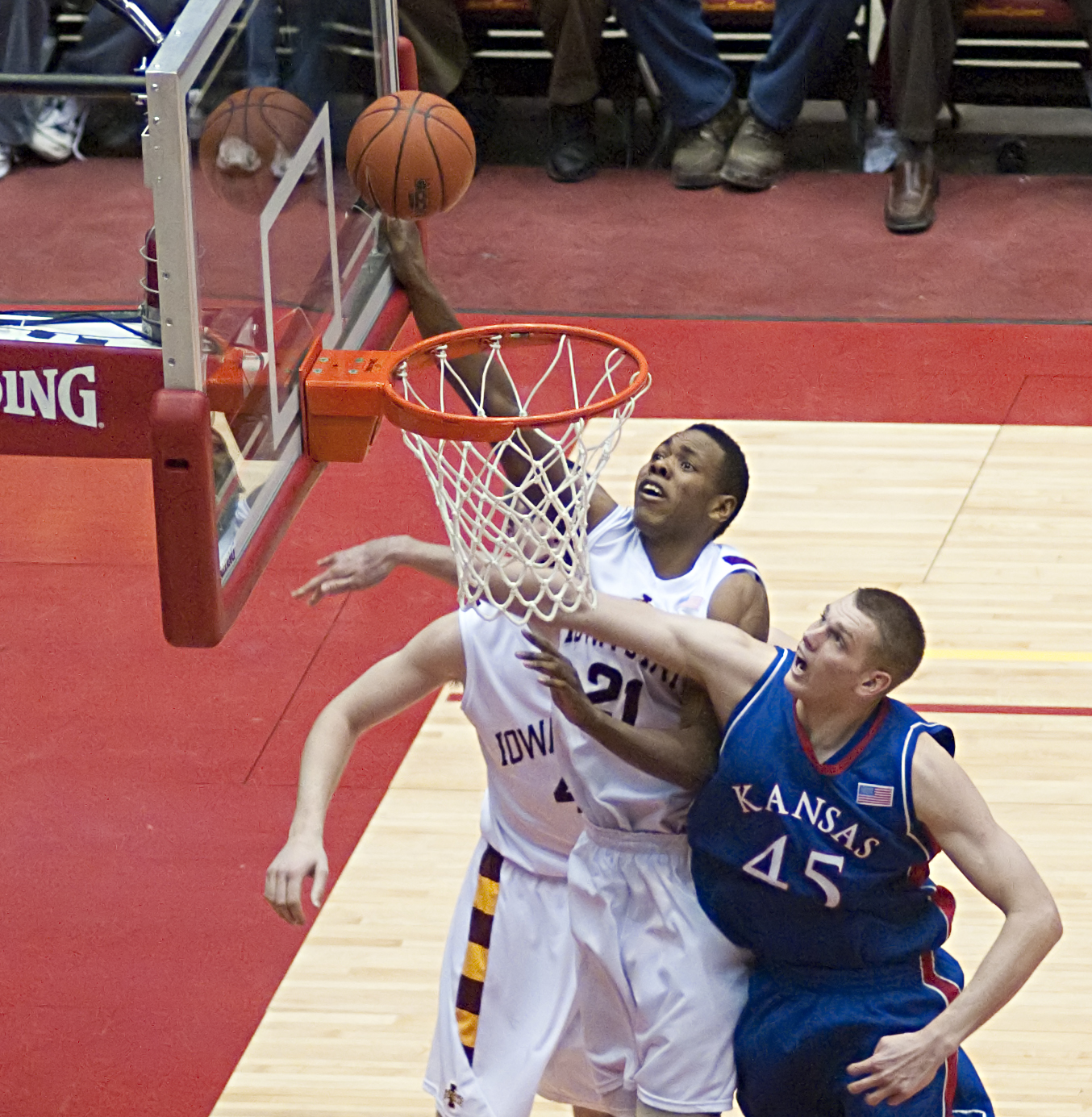
Brackins scoring for Iowa State

=== 2008–09 season ===
Craig Brackins rose to national prominence following a game in January, 2009 against Kansas in which he scored 42 points and grabbed 14 rebounds, despite Iowa State losing 82–67 to the Jayhawks.

=== 2009–10 season ===
Brackins scored 28 points and grabbed 12 rebounds in a 96–55 blowout of Mississippi Valley State on November 22, 2009. He declared himself eligible for the 2010 NBA draft on March 12, 2010.

== Professional career ==
He was drafted with the 21st pick by the Oklahoma City Thunder at the 2010 NBA draft in June. On July 8, 2010, he was traded, along with fellow rookie Quincy Pondexter, to the New Orleans Hornets in exchange for the rights to Cole Aldrich and Morris Peterson.

On September 23, 2010, he was again traded, along with Darius Songaila, to the Philadelphia 76ers in exchange for Willie Green and Jason Smith.

On November 30, 2010, Brackins was assigned to the Springfield Armor of the NBA Development League. In 5 games with the Armor, Brackins averaged 17.2 points and 8.6 rebounds. On December 12, 2010, he was recalled to the 76ers. He was sent back to Springfield on January 15, 2011, then recalled by the 76ers on February 7, 2011. He was sent back for another stint with the Armor on March 24, 2011.

In August 2011, Brackins signed with Maccabi Ashdod B.C. of Israel due to the 2011 NBA lockout. His contract expired in November, 2011.

In February 2012, Brackins was assigned to the Maine Red Claws. He was recalled on March 2, 2012.

On July 5, 2012, the Boston Celtics announced that Brackins was added to their roster for the 2012 Orlando Pro Summer League and the 2012 NBA Summer League.

Brackins signed with Angelico Biella of Italy later that summer. He left Angelico in December 2012.

On March 13, 2013, he was acquired by the Los Angeles D-Fenders of the NBA D-League.

On July 25, 2013, Brackins signed with Stelmet Zielona Góra.

== NBA career statistics ==
Legend
GP	Games played	GS	Games started	MPG	Minutes per game
FG%	Field goal percentage	3P%	3-point field goal percentage	FT%	Free throw percentage
RPG	Rebounds per game	APG	Assists per game	SPG	Steals per game
BPG	Blocks per game	PPG	Points per game	**Bold**	Career high

=== Regular season ===
Year	Team	GP	GS	MPG	FG%	3P%	FT%	RPG	APG	SPG	BPG	PPG
2010–11	Philadelphia	3	0	**11.0**	.250	.000	.000	**1.3**	.3	**.3**	.0	**2.7**
2011–12	Philadelphia	**14**	**1**	6.3	**.273**	**.333**	**.500**	1.1	**.6**	.0	**.1**	1.6
Career		17	1	7.1	.265	.214	.500	1.1	.5	.1	.1	1.8
