= 2025–26 Notre Dame Fighting Irish men's basketball team =

American college basketball season

2025–26 Notre Dame Fighting Irish men's basketball
- Conference: Atlantic Coast Conference
- Record: 13–18 (4–14 ACC)
- Head coach: Micah Shrewsberry (3rd season)
- Associate head coach: Kyle Getter (3rd season)
- Assistant coaches: Mike Farrelly (3rd season); Ryan Owens (3rd season); Tre Whitted (1st season); Grady Eifert (1st season)
- Home arena: Joyce Center

2025–26 ACC men's basketball standings
	Conf.				Overall
Team	W		L	PCT	W		L	PCT
No. 4 Duke †	17	–	1	.944	35	–	3	.921
No. 17 Virginia	15	–	3	.833	30	–	6	.833
No. 24 Miami (FL)	13	–	5	.722	26	–	9	.743
North Carolina	12	–	6	.667	24	–	9	.727
Clemson	12	–	6	.667	24	–	11	.686
No. 23 Louisville	11	–	7	.611	24	–	11	.686
NC State	10	–	8	.556	20	–	14	.588
Florida State	10	–	8	.556	18	–	15	.545
California	9	–	9	.500	22	–	12	.647
Stanford	9	–	9	.500	20	–	13	.606
SMU	8	–	10	.444	20	–	14	.588
Virginia Tech	8	–	10	.444	19	–	13	.594
Wake Forest	7	–	11	.389	18	–	17	.514
Syracuse	6	–	12	.333	15	–	17	.469
Pittsburgh	5	–	13	.278	13	–	20	.394
Notre Dame	4	–	14	.222	13	–	18	.419
Boston College	4	–	14	.222	11	–	20	.355
Georgia Tech	2	–	16	.111	11	–	20	.355
† 2026 ACC tournament winner Rankings from AP Poll

The 2025–26 Notre Dame Fighting Irish men's basketball team represented the University of Notre Dame, located in Notre Dame, Indiana, in the 2025–26 NCAA Division I men's basketball season. The team was led by head coach Micah Shrewsberry in his third season as head coach and played home games at the on-campus Joyce Center as members of the Atlantic Coast Conference (ACC).

The Fighting Irish began the season with three straight non-conference wins against non-Power 4 teams. They had their first loss at Ohio State by one point. They rebounded with a victory over Bellarmine before traveling to Paradise, Nevada to participate in the Players Era Festival. There, they lost their first game against Kansas, but defeated Rutgers in their second game. They lost their consolation game by ten points to third-ranked Houston. They returned to South Bend and defeated Missouri in the ACC–SEC Challenge. They followed that with three-straight wins, including an overtime win at TCU. They lost their final non-conference game by three points to Purdue Fort Wayne. The Fighting Irish began ACC play with a low-scoring 47–40 victory at Stanford. However, they went on a five-game losing streak after that win, which included a one-point loss at California , and a loss at twenty-second ranked North Carolina. They broke the streak with a four-point victory over Boston College. The victory was followed by another five-game losing streak, with a double-overtime loss to seventeenth-ranked Virginia, and a road loss to twenty-fourth ranked Louisville. They broke the streak with a victory over Georgia Tech. The Fighting Irish finished the season on a 1–4 stretch, where they defeated NC State in overtime and lost to top-ranked Duke by forty-four points. Their final game of the season was an eight-point loss to Boston College.

The Fighting Irish finished the season 13–18 and 4–14 in ACC play to finish in a tie for sixteenth place. They did not qualify for the 2026 ACC tournament and were not invited to a post-season tournament.

== Previous season ==
The Fighting Irish finished the season 15–18 and 8–12 in ACC play to finish in a five-way tie for ninth place. As the twelfth seed in the 2025 ACC tournament, they faced thirteenth-seed Pittsburgh in the First Round, a rematch of a game played just seventeen days earlier. The team won a low-scoring affair 55–54. They then were defeated in the Second Round by fifth-seed North Carolina. They were not invited to the NCAA tournament or the NIT.

== Offseason ==
=== Departures ===
Departures
Name	Number	Pos.	Height	Weight	Year	Hometown	Reason for Departure
Matt Allocco	41	G	6'4"	190	Graduate	Hilliard, OH	Graduated
Nikita Konstantynovskyi	25	F	6'10"	260	Graduate	Kyiv, Ukraine	Graduated
Burke Chebuhar	21	F	6'8"	240	Graduate	Marietta, GA	Graduated
Julian Roper II	1	G	6'4"	220	Senior	Detroit, MI	Graduated
Thomas Crowe	22	F	6'7"	220	Senior	Macedonia, OH	Walk-on; graduated
J.R. Konieczny	20	G	6'7"	205	Junior (Redshirt)	South Bend, IN	Graduated; transferred to Florida Gulf Coast
Tae Davis	7	F	6'9"	215	Junior	Indianapolis, IN	Transferred to Oklahoma
JT Kelly	10	G	6'2"	180	Junior	Ponte Vedra Beach, FL	Walk-on; graduated
Thomas Hattan	15	G	6'2"	180	Junior	San Clemente, CA	Walk-on; left team

=== Incoming transfers ===
Incoming transfers
Name	Number	Pos.	Height	Weight	Year	Hometown	Previous School
Carson Towt	33	F	6'8"	250	Graduate	Gilbert, AZ	Northern Arizona
Matthew MacLellan	34	F	6'9"	240	Graduate	Canton, MI	Madonna

=== 2025 recruiting class ===
College recruiting
Name	Hometown	School	Height	Weight	Commit date
Brady Koehler #15 PF	Fishers, IN	Cathedral High	6 ft 10 in (2.08 m)	205 lb (93 kg)	Sep 23, 2024
Brady Koehler #15 PF	Recruit ratings: Rivals: 247Sports: On3: ESPN: (82)				
Jalen Haralson #6 SF	Anderson, IN	La Lumiere	6 ft 7 in (2.01 m)	220 lb (100 kg)	Sep 25, 2024
Jalen Haralson #6 SF	Recruit ratings: Rivals: 247Sports: On3: ESPN: (89)				
Ryder Frost #19 SF	Beverly, MA	Phillips Exeter Academy	6 ft 7 in (2.01 m)	215 lb (98 kg)	Sep 27, 2024
Ryder Frost #19 SF	Recruit ratings: Rivals: 247Sports: On3: ESPN: (83)				
Tommy Ahneman #19 C	Fargo, ND	Cretin-Derham Hall	6 ft 11 in (2.11 m)	250 lb (110 kg)	Sep 30, 2024
Tommy Ahneman #19 C	Recruit ratings: Rivals: 247Sports: On3: ESPN: (79)				
Overall recruit ranking: Rivals: 9 247Sports: 13 ESPN: 9
Note: In many cases, Scout, Rivals, 247Sports, On3, and ESPN may conflict in their listings of height and weight.; In these cases, the average was taken. ESPN grades are on a 100-point scale.; Sources: "Notre Dame 2025 Basketball Commitments". Rivals.; "Notre Dame Fighting Irish". ESPN.; "2025 Team Ranking". Rivals.; "Notre Dame 2025 Basketball Commits". 247Sports.

== Roster ==
2025–26 Notre Dame Fighting Irish men's basketball team
Players
Coaches

Pos.	#	Name	Height	Weight	Year	Previous school	Hometown
F	33	Carson Towt	6 ft 8 in (2.03 m)	250 lb (113 kg)	GS	Northern Arizona	Gilbert, AZ
F	34	Matthew MacLellan (W)	6 ft 9 in (2.06 m)	240 lb (109 kg)	GS	Madonna	Canton, MI
F	14	Kebba Njie (injured)	6 ft 10 in (2.08 m)	255 lb (116 kg)	Sr	Penn State	Centerville, OH
G	3	Markus Burton (injured) (redshirt)	6 ft 0 in (1.83 m)	190 lb (86 kg)	Jr	Penn	Mishawaka, IN
G	11	Braeden Shrewsberry	6 ft 4 in (1.93 m)	205 lb (93 kg)	Jr	State College Area High	Granger, IN
G	2	Logan Imes	6 ft 4 in (1.93 m)	205 lb (93 kg)	Jr	Zionsville	Zionsville, IN
G	5	Cole Certa	6 ft 5 in (1.96 m)	205 lb (93 kg)	So	IMG Academy	Le Roy, IL
F	12	Garrett Sundra	6 ft 11 in (2.11 m)	230 lb (104 kg)	So	Paul VI Catholic	Ashburn, VA
G	13	Sir Mohammed	6 ft 6 in (1.98 m)	215 lb (98 kg)	So	Myers Park	Charlotte, NC
G	0	Brady Stevens (W)	6 ft 4 in (1.93 m)	195 lb (88 kg)	RS Fr	Wellesley	Boston, MA
F	6	Brady Koehler	6 ft 10 in (2.08 m)	205 lb (93 kg)	Fr	Cathedral High	Fishers, IN
G	10	Jalen Haralson	6 ft 7 in (2.01 m)	220 lb (100 kg)	Fr	La Lumiere	Anderson, IN
F	7	Ryder Frost	6 ft 7 in (2.01 m)	215 lb (98 kg)	Fr	Phillips Exeter Academy	Beverly, MA
C	15	Tommy Ahneman (injured) (redshirt)	6 ft 11 in (2.11 m)	250 lb (113 kg)	Fr	Cretin-Derham Hall	Fargo, ND
F	22	Luke Devine (W) (redshirt)	6 ft 7 in (2.01 m)	215 lb (98 kg)	Fr	Campolindo	Moraga, CA
G	24	Mark Zackery IV (W/L)	5 ft 11 in (1.8 m)	175 lb (79 kg)	Fr	Ben Davis	Indianapolis, IN

Head coach

- Micah Shrewsberry (Hanover)

Assistant coach(es)

- Kyle Getter (Hanover)
- Mike Farrelly (Saint Joseph's)
- Ryan Owens (Southern Indiana)
- Tre Whitted (Marshall)
- Grady Eifert (Purdue)

Legend

- (C) Team captain
- (S) Suspended
- (I) Ineligible
- (W) Walk-on
- (L) Left team
- Injured
- Current redshirt

Roster

- Roster is subject to change as/if players transfer or leave the program for other reasons.
- Mark Zackery IV joined the team on December 11, 2025, while already on football scholarship, and left the team on January 24, 2026.

=== Depth chart ===
Pos.	Starting 5	Bench 1	Bench 2
C	Carson Towt		Matthew MacLellan
PF	Brady Koehler	Garrett Sundra
SF	Jalen Haralson		Ryder Frost
SG	Cole Certa	Sir Mohammed	Brady Stevens
PG	Braeden Shrewsberry	Logan Imes

== Schedule and results ==
Date time, TV	Rank^{#}	Opponent^{#}	Result	Record	High points	High rebounds	High assists	Site (attendance) city, state
Exhibition
October 17, 2025*; 7:00 p.m.		at Butler	W 77–76	-	12 – Tied	6 – Haralson	4 – Haralson	Hinkle Fieldhouse (7,887); Indianapolis, IN
October 24, 2025*; 6:00 p.m.		DePaul	L 62–69	-	10 – Burton	10 – Njie	7 – Burton	Joyce Center (3,617); South Bend, IN
Non-conference regular season
November 3, 2025*; 7:00 p.m., ACCNX		LIU	W 89–67	1–0	24 – Burton	19 – Towt	3 – Tied	Joyce Center (3,911); South Bend, IN
November 7, 2025*; 7:00 p.m., ACCNX		Detroit Mercy	W 102–70	2–0	19 – Shrewsberry	10 – Towt	6 – Mohammed	Joyce Center (7,608); South Bend, IN
November 11, 2025*; 7:30 p.m., ACCNX		Eastern Illinois	W 78–58	3–0	21 – Burton	11 – Towt	3 – Tied	Joyce Center (3,618); South Bend, IN
November 16, 2025*; 12:30 p.m., FS1		at Ohio State	L 63–64	3–1	14 – Burton	12 – Towt	3 – Haralson	Value City Arena (12,357); Columbus, OH
November 19, 2025*; 7:00 p.m., ACCNX		Bellarmine	W 86–79	4–1	25 – Burton	11 – Towt	5 – Haralson	Joyce Center (3,676); South Bend, IN
November 24, 2025*; 3:30 p.m., TNT		vs. Kansas; Players Era Festival Game 1	L 61–71	4–2	24 – Burton	10 – Towt	2 – Towt	MGM Grand Garden Arena (4,628); Paradise, NV
November 25, 2025*; 1:00 p.m., TNT		vs. Rutgers; Players Era Festival Game 2	W 68–63	5–2	21 – Burton	6 – Tied	5 – Burton	MGM Grand Garden Arena; Paradise, NV
November 26, 2025*; 3:30 p.m., TNT		vs. No. 3 Houston; Players Era Festival Consolation Game	L 56–66	5–3	19 – Burton	7 – Burton	5 – Burton	MGM Grand Garden Arena (1,629); Paradise, NV
December 2, 2025*; 9:00 p.m., ESPNU		Missouri; ACC–SEC Challenge	W 76–71	6–3	18 – Burton	9 – Towt	10 – Burton	Joyce Center (4,980); South Bend, IN
December 5, 2025*; 8:00 p.m., ESPN+		at TCU	W 87–85 ^{OT}	7–3	20 – Tied	9 – Towt	9 – Haralson	Schollmaier Arena (5,706); Fort Worth, TX
December 10, 2025*; 7:00 p.m., ACCNX		Idaho	W 80–65	8–3	20 – Haralson	15 – Towt	3 – Towt	Joyce Center (3,687); South Bend, IN
December 13, 2025*; 2:00 p.m., ACCN		Evansville	W 82–58	9–3	26 – Shrewsberry	10 – Njie	3 – Tied	Joyce Center (4,323); South Bend, IN
December 21, 2025*; 12:00 p.m., ACCNX		Purdue Fort Wayne	L 69–72	9–4	21 – Haralson	10 – Towt	4 – Haralson	Joyce Center (5,366); South Bend, IN
ACC regular season
December 30, 2025; 9:00 p.m., ESPN2		at Stanford	W 47–40	10–4 (1–0)	13 – Haralson	10 – Towt	3 – Imes	Maples Pavilion (3,868); Stanford, CA
January 2, 2026; 11:00 p.m., ESPN2		at California	L 71–72	10–5 (1–1)	21 – Shrewsberry	15 – Towt	6 – Imes	Haas Pavilion (5,158); Berkeley, CA
January 10, 2026; 6:00 p.m., ESPN2		Clemson	L 61–76	10–6 (1–2)	18 – Haralson	10 – Towt	2 – Tied	Joyce Center (6,933); South Bend, IN
January 13, 2026; 7:00 p.m., ESPNU		Miami	L 69–81	10–7 (1–3)	18 – Haralson	8 – Imes	3 – Shrewsberry	Joyce Center (5,278); South Bend, IN
January 17, 2026; 12:00 p.m., ACCN		at Virginia Tech	L 76–89	10–8 (1–4)	17 – Koehler	5 – Mohammed	3 – Mohammed	Cassell Coliseum (8,925); Blacksburg, VA
January 21, 2026; 7:00 p.m., ESPN2		at No. 22 North Carolina	L 69–91	10–9 (1–5)	14 – Mohammed	6 – Tied	5 – Shrewsberry	Dean Smith Center (19,686); Chapel Hill, NC
January 24, 2026; 6:00 p.m., ACCN		Boston College	W 68–64	11–9 (2–5)	22 – Shrewsberry	13 – Towt	2 – Tied	Joyce Center (5,248); South Bend, IN
January 27, 2026; 7:00 p.m., ESPN2		No. 17 Virginia	L 97–100 ^{2OT}	11–10 (2–6)	34 – Certa	10 – Koehler	7 – Haralson	Joyce Center (4,012); South Bend, IN
January 31, 2026; 12:00 p.m., The CW		at Syracuse	L 72–86	11–11 (2–7)	26 – Haralson	8 – Towt	4 – Haralson	JMA Wireless Dome (21,455); Syracuse, NY
February 4, 2026; 7:00 p.m., ESPN2		at No. 24 Louisville	L 65–76	11–12 (2–8)	18 – Certa	10 – Towt	5 – Haralson	KFC Yum! Center (14,787); Louisville, KY
February 7, 2026; 4:00 p.m., The CW		Florida State	L 79–82	11–13 (2–9)	18 – Shrewsberry	8 – Tied	4 – Shrewsberry	Joyce Center (6,170); South Bend, IN
February 10, 2026; 7:00 p.m., ACCN		at SMU	L 81–89	11–14 (2–10)	23 – Haralson	6 – Koehler	6 – Mohammed	Moody Coliseum (5,819); University Park, TX
February 14, 2026; 12:00 p.m., The CW		Georgia Tech	W 89–74	12–14 (3–10)	37 – Certa	9 – Tied	4 – Shrewsberry	Joyce Center (5,906); South Bend, IN
February 21, 2026; 2:00 p.m., ACCN		at Pittsburgh	L 68–73	12–15 (3–11)	16 – Certa	13 – Towt	4 – Towt	Petersen Events Center (6,406); Pittsburgh, PA
February 24, 2026; 7:00 p.m., ESPN		No. 1 Duke	L 56–100	12–16 (3–12)	14 – Tied	7 – Towt	2 – Mohammed	Joyce Center (9,149); South Bend, IN
February 28, 2026; 12:00 p.m., The CW		NC State	W 96–90 ^{OT}	13–16 (4–12)	32 – Certa	9 – Tied	3 – Tied	Joyce Center (6,446); South Bend, IN
March 4, 2026; 9:00 p.m., ESPNU		Stanford	L 78–86	13–17 (4–13)	19 – Haralson	6 – Sundra	3 – Tied	Joyce Center (3,902); South Bend, IN
March 7, 2026; 12:00 p.m., ESPNU		at Boston College	L 69–77	13–18 (4–14)	21 – Haralson	11 – Koehler	3 – Shrewsberry	Conte Forum (5,029); Chestnut Hill, MA
*Non-conference game. ^{#}Rankings from AP Poll. (#) Tournament seedings in parentheses. All times are in Eastern Time.

== Rankings ==
Ranking movements Legend: ██ Increase in ranking ██ Decrease in ranking — = Not ranked RV = Received votes
	Week																				
Poll	Pre	1	2	3	4	5	6	7	8	9	10	11	12	13	14	15	16	17	18	19	Final
AP	—	—	—	—	—	RV	—	—	—	—	—	—	—	—	—	—	—	—	—	—	—
Coaches	—	—	—	—	—	—	—	—	—	—	—	—	—	—	—	—	—	—	—	—	—
