= 2024–25 Notre Dame Fighting Irish men's basketball team =

American college basketball season

2024–25 Notre Dame Fighting Irish men's basketball
- Conference: Atlantic Coast Conference
- Record: 15–18 (8–12 ACC)
- Head coach: Micah Shrewsberry (2nd season)
- Associate head coach: Kyle Getter (2nd season)
- Assistant coaches: Mike Farrelly (2nd season); Ryan Owens (2nd season)
- Home arena: Joyce Center

2024–25 ACC men's basketball standings
	Conf.				Overall
Team	W		L	PCT	W		L	PCT
No. 3 Duke †	19	–	1	.950	35	–	4	.897
No. 21 Louisville	18	–	2	.900	27	–	8	.771
No. 22 Clemson	18	–	2	.900	27	–	7	.794
Wake Forest	13	–	7	.650	21	–	11	.656
North Carolina	13	–	7	.650	23	–	14	.622
SMU	13	–	7	.650	24	–	11	.686
Stanford	11	–	9	.550	21	–	14	.600
Georgia Tech	10	–	10	.500	17	–	17	.500
Virginia	8	–	12	.400	15	–	17	.469
Virginia Tech	8	–	12	.400	13	–	19	.406
Florida State	8	–	12	.400	17	–	15	.531
Notre Dame	8	–	12	.400	15	–	18	.455
Pittsburgh	8	–	12	.400	17	–	15	.531
Syracuse	7	–	13	.350	14	–	19	.424
California	6	–	14	.300	14	–	19	.424
NC State	5	–	15	.250	12	–	19	.387
Boston College	4	–	16	.200	12	–	19	.387
Miami (FL)	3	–	17	.150	7	–	24	.226
† 2025 ACC tournament winner Rankings from AP poll

The 2024–25 Notre Dame Fighting Irish men's basketball team represented the University of Notre Dame, located in Notre Dame, Indiana, in the 2024–25 NCAA Division I men's basketball season. The team was led by head coach Micah Shrewsberry in his second season as head coach and played home games at the on-campus Joyce Center as members of the Atlantic Coast Conference (ACC).

The Fighting Irish started the season with four straight wins, including a win at Georgetown to begin the season. They then lost to Elon at home before traveling to Paradise, Nevada to participate in the Players Era Festival tournament. They opened the tournament with an overtime loss to Rutgers in the Impact Division. They then lost 65–54 to sixth-ranked Houston in their second game of the tournament. They lost to twenty-first ranked Creighton 80–76, to finish in eighth place in the tournament. They returned to face Georgia in the ACC–SEC Challenge. They lost in Athens 69–48. A win in their opening ACC game against Syracuse broke their five-game losing streak. They won their final two non-conference games. The Fighting Irish then went on a four-game losing streak in ACC play. They suffered one-point losses against North Carolina and NC State during the run, and lost to fourth-ranked Duke. They turned their fortunes around by going 3–1 over their next four games, with their only loss being a re-match with Syracuse. However, they then won only one game in a six-game stretch. They defeated Boston College 97–94 in double-overtime. Losses during the stretch included away games at Florida State and Miami, and a two-point loss at home to Virginia Tech. They went 3–2 in their final five games of the season, notching a four-point win over Pittsburgh and a two-point win against Stanford. They lost to thirteenth-ranked Clemson and by just three points at Wake Forest. In their final game of the season, they won an epic four overtime game against California.

The Fighting Irish finished the season 15–18 and 8–12 in ACC play to finish in a five-way tie for ninth place. As the twelfth seed in the 2025 ACC tournament, they faced thirteenth-seed Pittsburgh in the First Round, a rematch of a game played just seventeen days earlier. The team won a low-scoring affair 55–54. They then were defeated in the Second Round by fifth-seed North Carolina. They were not invited to the NCAA tournament or the NIT.

== Previous season ==
The Fighting Irish finished the season 13–20 and 7–13 in ACC play to finish in a tie for twelfth place. As the twelfth seed in the ACC tournament, they defeated thirteenth seed Georgia Tech in the First Round before losing to fifth seed Wake Forest in the Second Round. They were not invited to the NCAA tournament or the NIT.

== Offseason ==
=== Departures ===
Departures
Name	Number	Pos.	Height	Weight	Year	Hometown	Reason for departure
Matt Zona	25	F	6'9"	252	Senior	Blauvelt, NY	Graduated; transferred to Fordham
Tony Sanders Jr.	12	G	6'7"	217	Senior	Miami, FL	Graduated
Raheem Braiton	5	G	6'0"	175	Senior	South Bend, IN	Walk-on; graduated
Alex Wade	4	G	6'0"	173	Sophomore (Redshirt)	San Diego, CA	Graduated
Zane Harbaugh	23	F	6'6"	210	Sophomore	Owasso, OK	Walk-on; left team
Carey Booth	0	F	6'10"	203	Freshman	Englewood, CO	Transferred to Illinois

=== Incoming transfers ===
Incoming transfers
Name	Number	Pos.	Height	Weight	Year	Hometown	Previous school
Matt Allocco	41	G	6'4"	190	Graduate	Hilliard, OH	Princeton
Nikita Konstantynovskyi	25	F	6'10"	260	Graduate	Kyiv, Ukraine	Monmouth
Burke Chebuhar	21	F	6'8"	240	Graduate	Marietta, GA	Lehigh

=== 2024 recruiting class ===
College recruiting
Name	Hometown	School	Height	Weight	Commit date
Cole Certa #25 SG	Le Roy, IL	IMG Academy	6 ft 5 in (1.96 m)	200 lb (91 kg)	May 4, 2023
Cole Certa #25 SG	Recruit ratings: Rivals: 247Sports: On3: ESPN: (82)				
Garrett Sundra #33 PF	Ashburn, VA	Paul VI Catholic	6 ft 11 in (2.11 m)	215 lb (98 kg)	Aug 10, 2023
Garrett Sundra #33 PF	Recruit ratings: Rivals: 247Sports: On3: ESPN: (81)				
Sir Mohammed #29 SF	Charlotte, NC	Myers Park	6 ft 6 in (1.98 m)	215 lb (98 kg)	Aug 12, 2023
Sir Mohammed #29 SF	Recruit ratings: Rivals: 247Sports: On3: ESPN: (86)				
Overall recruit ranking: Rivals: 35 247Sports: 28
Note: In many cases, Scout, Rivals, 247Sports, On3, and ESPN may conflict in their listings of height and weight.; In these cases, the average was taken. ESPN grades are on a 100-point scale.; Sources: "Notre Dame Fighting Irish". ESPN.; "2024 Team Ranking". Rivals.; "Notre Dame 2024 Basketball Commits". 247Sports.

=== Scheduling a game with Le Moyne ===
Although a December non-conference game against Le Moyne, a team in the second year of a four-year transition to Division I status, may not appear notable at first glance, it finally fulfills a wish expressed by Notre Dame athletic director Moose Krause nearly 70 years earlier. The NCAA had not yet created separate divisions in 1955, but the Associated Press classified basketball teams as either major programs or small colleges, and Le Moyne was in the small college group. However, the Dolphins played a 19-game schedule during the 1954–55 season, finishing 11–8, and more than half of Le Moyne's games were against major programs. The Dolphins were 5–5 in matchups with major programs, including a win over no. 20 Western Kentucky State. Krause was the keynote speaker at an event at Le Moyne after the season, and he said that he hoped a basketball game between Notre Dame and Le Moyne could be arranged in the not too distant future. In the first-ever meeting between the programs, the Fighting Irish went on a 16–2 run over a span of 4:27 to extend their three-point lead to 34–17. The Dolphins were unable to close the gap, and Notre Dame cruised to a 91–62 victory. Tae Davis scored 24 points to lead the Irish and added six rebounds.

== Roster ==
2024–25 Notre Dame Fighting Irish men's basketball team
Players
Coaches

Pos.	#	Name	Height	Weight	Year	Previous school	Hometown
G	41	Matt Allocco	6 ft 4 in (1.93 m)	190 lb (86 kg)	GS	Princeton	Hilliard, OH
F	25	Nikita Konstantynovskyi	6 ft 10 in (2.08 m)	260 lb (118 kg)	GS	Monmouth	Kyiv, Ukraine
F	21	Burke Chebuhar	6 ft 8 in (2.03 m)	240 lb (109 kg)	GS	Lehigh	Marietta, GA
G	1	Julian Roper II	6 ft 4 in (1.93 m)	220 lb (100 kg)	Sr	Northwestern	Detroit, MI
F	22	Thomas Crowe (W)	6 ft 7 in (2.01 m)	220 lb (100 kg)	Sr	Archbishop Hoban	Macedonia, OH
G	20	J.R. Konieczny	6 ft 7 in (2.01 m)	205 lb (93 kg)	RS Jr	St. Joseph	South Bend, IN
F	14	Kebba Njie (injured)	6 ft 10 in (2.08 m)	250 lb (113 kg)	Jr	Penn State	Centerville, OH
F	7	Tae Davis	6 ft 9 in (2.06 m)	215 lb (98 kg)	Jr	Seton Hall	Indianapolis, IN
G	10	JT Kelly (W)	6 ft 2 in (1.88 m)	180 lb (82 kg)	Jr	Ponte Vedra	Ponte Vedra Beach, FL
G	15	Thomas Hattan (W)	6 ft 2 in (1.88 m)	180 lb (82 kg)	Jr	San Juan Hills	San Clemente, CA
G	3	Markus Burton	6 ft 0 in (1.83 m)	190 lb (86 kg)	So	Penn	Mishawaka, IN
G	11	Braeden Shrewsberry (injured)	6 ft 4 in (1.93 m)	200 lb (91 kg)	So	State College Area High	Granger, IN
G	2	Logan Imes	6 ft 4 in (1.93 m)	195 lb (88 kg)	So	Zionsville	Zionsville, IN
G	5	Cole Certa	6 ft 5 in (1.96 m)	200 lb (91 kg)	Fr	IMG Academy	Le Roy, IL
F	12	Garrett Sundra	6 ft 11 in (2.11 m)	215 lb (98 kg)	Fr	Paul VI Catholic	Ashburn, VA
G	4	Sir Mohammed	6 ft 6 in (1.98 m)	215 lb (98 kg)	Fr	Myers Park	Charlotte, NC
G	0	Brady Stevens (W) (redshirt)	6 ft 4 in (1.93 m)	200 lb (91 kg)	Fr	Wellesley	Boston, MA

Head coach

- Micah Shrewsberry (Hanover)

Assistant coach(es)

- Kyle Getter (Hanover)
- Mike Farrelly (Saint Joseph's)
- Ryan Owens (Southern Indiana)

Legend

- (C) Team captain
- (S) Suspended
- (I) Ineligible
- (W) Walk-on
- Injured
- Current redshirt

Roster

=== Depth chart ===
Pos.	Starting 5	Bench 1	Bench 2	Bench 3
C	Nikita Konstantynovskyi	Garrett Sundra
PF	Tae Davis		Burke Chebuhar
SF	Julian Roper II	J.R. Konieczny		Thomas Crowe
SG	Matt Allocco	Cole Certa		JT Kelly
PG	Markus Burton	Sir Mohammed	Logan Imes	Thomas Hattan

== Schedule and results ==
Date time, TV	Rank^{#}	Opponent^{#}	Result	Record	High points	High rebounds	High assists	Site (attendance) city, state
Exhibition
October 30, 2024*; 7:00 p.m., ESPN+		at Purdue Fort Wayne	W 91–54	–	18 – Tied	6 – Konieczny	4 – Tied	War Memorial Coliseum (5,905); Fort Wayne, IN
Regular season
November 6, 2024*; 7:00 p.m., ACCNX/ESPN+		Stonehill	W 89–60	1–0	18 – Tied	10 – Njie	5 – Burton	Joyce Center (5,121); South Bend, IN
November 11, 2024*; 7:00 p.m., ACCNX/ESPN+		Buffalo	W 86–77	2–0	27 – Davis	9 – Burton	8 – Burton	Joyce Center (4,132); South Bend, IN
November 16, 2024*; 1:00 p.m., NBC		at Georgetown	W 84–63	3–0	17 – Allocco	8 – Tied	7 – Allocco	Capital One Arena (8,819); Washington, D.C.
November 19, 2024*; 7:00 p.m., ACCNX/ESPN+		North Dakota	W 75–58	4–0	29 – Burton	9 – Burton	3 – Burton	Joyce Center (3,912); South Bend, IN
November 22, 2024*; 7:30 p.m., ACCNX/ESPN+		Elon	L 77–84	4–1	25 – Burton	7 – Njie	5 – Burton	Joyce Center (4,475); South Bend, IN
November 26, 2024*; 10:30 p.m., TBS		vs. Rutgers; Players Era Festival Impact Division	L 84–85 ^{OT}	4–2	24 – Allocco	10 – Allocco	5 – Allocco	MGM Grand Garden Arena (7,602); Paradise, NV
November 28, 2024*; 12:30 a.m., TBS		vs. No. 6 Houston; Players Era Festival Impact Division	L 54–65	4–3	22 – Davis	8 – Davis	4 – Tied	MGM Grand Garden Arena; Paradise, NV
November 30, 2024*; 1:00 p.m., TruTV		vs. No. 21 Creighton; Players Era Festival 7th place game	L 76–80	4–4	17 – Tied	6 – Njie	5 – Davis	MGM Grand Garden Arena; Paradise, NV
December 3, 2024*; 7:00 p.m., ESPNU		at Georgia; ACC–SEC Challenge	L 48–69	4–5	14 – Tied	6 – Tied	3 – Allocco	Stegeman Coliseum (8,045); Athens, GA
December 7, 2024; 12:00 p.m., The CW		Syracuse	W 69–64	5–5 (1–0)	25 – Shrewsberry	9 – Njie	2 – Davis	Joyce Center (6,280); South Bend, IN
December 11, 2024*; 7:00 p.m., ACCN		Dartmouth	W 77–65	6–5	22 – Shrewsberry	10 – Davis	5 – Allocco	Joyce Center (3,827); South Bend, IN
December 22, 2024*; 6:00 p.m., ACCN		Le Moyne	W 91–62	7–5	24 – Davis	8 – Sundra	6 – Allocco	Joyce Center (5,396); South Bend, IN
December 31, 2024; 2:30 p.m., ACCN		at Georgia Tech	L 75–86	7–6 (1–1)	27 – Davis	7 – Davis	7 – Allocoo	McCamish Pavilion (4,914); Atlanta, GA
January 4, 2025; 12:00 p.m., CBS		North Carolina	L 73–74	7–7 (1–2)	23 – Burton	6 – Tied	2 – Tied	Joyce Center (9,149); South Bend, IN
January 8, 2025; 7:00 p.m., ESPNU		at NC State	L 65–66	7–8 (1–3)	15 – Burton	11 – Njie	6 – Davis	Lenovo Center (13,515); Raleigh, NC
January 11, 2025; 12:00 p.m., ESPN		at No. 4 Duke	L 78–86	7–9 (1–4)	23 – Burton	5 – Burton	4 – Shrewsberry	Cameron Indoor Stadium (9,314); Durham, NC
January 13, 2025; 7:00 p.m., ACCN		Boston College	W 78–60	8–9 (2–4)	26 – Davis	9 – Njie	2 – Tied	Joyce Center (4,693); South Bend, IN
January 18, 2025; 4:00 p.m., ACCN		at Syracuse	L 69–77	8–10 (2–5)	28 – Burton	7 – Tied	2 – Burton	JMA Wireless Dome (20,842); Syracuse, NY
January 25, 2025; 6:30 p.m., ESPN2		at Virginia	W 74–59	9–10 (3–5)	21 – Burton	7 – Tied	5 – Davis	John Paul Jones Arena (14,637); Charlottesville, VA
January 28, 2025; 9:00 p.m., ACCN		Georgia Tech	W 71–68	10–10 (4–5)	26 – Burton	9 – Njie	4 – Burton	Joyce Center (4,262); South Bend, IN
February 1, 2025; 8:00 p.m., ESPN2		at Miami (FL)	L 57–63	10–11 (4–6)	17 – Burton	8 – Allocco	5 – Allocco	Watsco Center (3,649); Coral Gables, FL
February 4, 2025; 7:00 p.m., ACCN		at Florida State	L 60–67	10–12 (4–7)	25 – Burton	9 – Davis	3 – Mohammed	Donald L. Tucker Center (5,101); Tallahassee, FL
February 8, 2025; 1:00 p.m., The CW		Virginia Tech	L 63–65	10–13 (4–8)	23 – Burton	8 – Davis	3 – Shrewsberry	Joyce Center (6,959); South Bend, IN
February 12, 2025; 9:00 p.m., ESPNU		at Boston College	W 97–94 ^{2OT}	11–13 (5–8)	32 – Burton	12 – Njie	3 – Tied	Conte Forum (2,678); Chestnut Hill, MA
February 16, 2025; 8:00 p.m., ACCN		Louisville	L 60–75	11–14 (5–9)	22 – Burton	7 – Njie	4 – Burton	Joyce Center (5,437); South Bend, IN
February 19, 2025; 7:00 p.m., ACCN		SMU	L 73–97	11–15 (5–10)	21 – Shrewsberry	5 – Davis	3 – Tied	Joyce Center (4,332); South Bend, IN
February 22, 2025; 2:15 p.m., The CW		Pittsburgh	W 76–72	12–15 (6–10)	21 – Davis	7 – Njie	3 – Tied	Joyce Center (6,489); South Bend, IN
February 26, 2025; 7:00 p.m., ACCN		at No. 13 Clemson	L 68–83	12–16 (6–11)	30 – Burton	7 – Konieczny	5 – Burton	Littlejohn Coliseum (8,761); Clemson, SC
March 1, 2025; 5:30 p.m., The CW		at Wake Forest	L 71–74	12–17 (6–12)	29 – Burton	9 – Konstantynovskyi	4 – Burton	LJVM Coliseum (10,298); Winston-Salem, NC
March 5, 2025; 9:00 p.m., ESPNU		Stanford	W 56–54	13–17 (7–12)	24 – Burton	8 – Davis	4 – Davis	Joyce Center (4,043); South Bend, IN
March 8, 2025; 4:00 p.m., ACCN		California	W 112–110 ^{4OT}	14–17 (8–12)	43 – Burton	17 – Konstantynovskyi	5 – Burton	Joyce Center (5,683); South Bend, IN
ACC Tournament
March 11, 2025; 2:00 p.m., ACCN	(12)	vs. (13) Pittsburgh; First round	W 55–54	15–17	11 – Davis	9 – Konstantynovskyi	3 – Burton	Spectrum Center (5,136); Charlotte, NC
March 12, 2025; 2:30 p.m., ESPN	(12)	vs. (5) North Carolina; Second round	L 56–76	15–18	11 – Burton	9 – Konstantynovskyi	2 – Mohammed	Spectrum Center (9,722); Charlotte, NC
*Non-conference game. ^{#}Rankings from AP Poll. (#) Tournament seedings in parentheses. All times are in Eastern Time.

== Rankings ==
Ranking movements Legend: — = Not ranked
	Week																				
Poll	Pre	1	2	3	4	5	6	7	8	9	10	11	12	13	14	15	16	17	18	19	Final
AP	—	—	—	—	—	—	—	—	—	—	—	—	—	—	—	—	—	—	—	—	—
Coaches	—	—	—	—	—	—	—	—	—	—	—	—	—	—	—	—	—	—	—	—	—
