= 2023–24 Notre Dame Fighting Irish men's basketball team =

American college basketball season

2023–24 Notre Dame Fighting Irish men's basketball
- Conference: Atlantic Coast Conference
- Record: 13–20 (7–13 ACC)
- Head coach: Micah Shrewsberry (1st season)
- Associate head coach: Kyle Getter (1st season)
- Assistant coaches: Mike Farrelly (1st season); Ryan Owens (1st season)
- Captain: Matt Zona
- Home arena: Joyce Center

2023–24 ACC men's basketball standings
	Conf.				Overall
Team	W		L	PCT	W		L	PCT
No. 7 North Carolina	17	–	3	.850	29	–	8	.784
No. 9 Duke	15	–	5	.750	27	–	9	.750
Virginia	13	–	7	.650	23	–	11	.676
Pittsburgh	12	–	8	.600	22	–	11	.667
Wake Forest	11	–	9	.550	21	–	14	.600
No. 14 Clemson	11	–	9	.550	24	–	12	.667
Syracuse	11	–	9	.550	20	–	12	.625
Virginia Tech	10	–	10	.500	19	–	15	.559
Florida State	10	–	10	.500	17	–	16	.515
No. 10 NC State †	9	–	11	.450	26	–	15	.634
Boston College	8	–	12	.400	20	–	16	.556
Notre Dame	7	–	13	.350	13	–	20	.394
Georgia Tech	7	–	13	.350	14	–	18	.438
Miami (FL)	6	–	14	.300	15	–	17	.469
Louisville	3	–	17	.150	8	–	24	.250
† 2024 ACC tournament winner Rankings from AP Poll

The 2023–24 Notre Dame Fighting Irish men's basketball team represented the University of Notre Dame, located in Notre Dame, Indiana, in the 2023–24 NCAA Division I men's basketball season. The team was led by head coach Micah Shrewsberry in his first season as head coach and played home games at the on-campus Joyce Center as members of the Atlantic Coast Conference (ACC).

The Fighting Irish started off the season 2–2 including a win in overtime over Oklahoma State in their early season tournament, the Legends Classic. The team won one game before losing to South Carolina in the ACC–SEC Challenge and number 8 Miami (FL) in their opening ACC game. Another win came before a three-game losing streak. The Fighting Irish lost to number 8 Marquette and in overtime to Georgetown. The team then won three of its next five including an overtime victory over Georgia Tech. During this stretch, they also lost to number 14 Duke. After the Georgia Tech win, the Fighting Irish went on a seven-game losing streak which included another loss to Duke when Duke was ranked ninth. The Fighting Irish rebounded by winning five of their next six, with their only loss coming at Syracuse. They could not carry the momentum into their final two games as they lost to number seven North Carolina and Virginia Tech to close out the regular season.

The Fighting Irish finished the season 13–20 and 7–13 in ACC play to finish in a tie for twelfth place. As the twelfth seed in the ACC tournament, they defeated thirteenth seed Georgia Tech in the First Round before losing to fifth seed Wake Forest in the Second Round. They were not invited to the NCAA tournament or the NIT.

== Previous season ==
The Fighting Irish finished the 2022–23 season 11–21, 3–17 in ACC Play to finish in second to last place. As the No. 14 seed, they lost in the first round of the ACC tournament to No. 11 seed Virginia Tech.

== Offseason ==
=== Departures ===
Departures
Name	Number	Pos.	Height	Weight	Year	Hometown	Reason for departure
Robby Carmody	24	G	6'4"	205	GS	Mars, PA	Transferred to Mercer
Dane Goodwin	23	G	6'6"	214	GS	Upper Arlington, OH	Completed college eligibility
Nate Laszewski	14	F	6'10"	230	GS	Jupiter, FL	Completed college eligibility
Cormac Ryan	5	G	6'5"	195	GS	New York, NY	Transferred to North Carolina
Trey Wertz	3	G	6'5"	193	GS	Charlotte, NC	Completed college eligibility
Marcus Hammond	10	G	6'4"	188	GS	Queens, NY	Completed college eligibility
Dom Campbell	13	F	6'9"	268	Freshman	Scarborough, ME	Transferred to Howard
JJ Starling	1	G	6'4"	200	Freshman	Baldwinsville, NY	Transferred to Syracuse
Ven-Allen Lubin	2	F	6'8"	226	Freshman	Orlando, FL	Transferred to Vanderbilt

=== Incoming transfers ===
Incoming transfers
Name	Number	Pos.	Height	Weight	Year	Hometown	Previous school
Julian Roper II	1	G	6'4"	210	Junior	Detroit, MI	Northwestern
Kebba Njie	14	F	6'10"	254	Sophomore	Centerville, OH	Penn State
Tae Davis	13	F	6'9"	208	Sophomore	Indianapolis, IN	Seton Hall

=== 2023 recruiting class ===
College recruiting
Name	Hometown	School	Height	Weight	Commit date
Markus Burton #24 PG	Mishawaka, IN	Penn	5 ft 11 in (1.80 m)	166 lb (75 kg)	Jul 29, 2022
Markus Burton #24 PG	Recruit ratings: Rivals: 247Sports: On3: ESPN: (81)				
Braeden Shrewsberry #43 SG	State College, PA	State College Area High	6 ft 3 in (1.91 m)	189 lb (86 kg)	Mar 30, 2023
Braeden Shrewsberry #43 SG	Recruit ratings: Rivals: 247Sports: On3: ESPN: (81)				
Carey Booth #7 C	Englewood, CO	Brewster Academy	6 ft 10 in (2.08 m)	203 lb (92 kg)	May 2, 2023
Carey Booth #7 C	Recruit ratings: Rivals: 247Sports: On3: ESPN: (85)				
Logan Imes #17 CG	Zionsville, IN	Zionsville	6 ft 4 in (1.93 m)	189 lb (86 kg)	May 3, 2023
Logan Imes #17 CG	Recruit ratings: Rivals: 247Sports: On3: ESPN: (80)				
Overall recruit ranking: Rivals: 38 247Sports: 26
Note: In many cases, Scout, Rivals, 247Sports, On3, and ESPN may conflict in their listings of height and weight.; In these cases, the average was taken. ESPN grades are on a 100-point scale.; Sources: "Notre Dame Fighting Irish". ESPN.; "2023 Team Ranking". Rivals.; "Notre Dame 2023 Basketball Commits". 247Sports.

== Roster ==
2023–24 Notre Dame Fighting Irish men's basketball team
Players
Coaches

Pos.	#	Name	Height	Weight	Year	Previous school	Hometown
F	25	Matt Zona (C)	6 ft 9 in (2.06 m)	252 lb (114 kg)	Sr	Bergen Catholic	Blauvelt, NY
G	12	Tony Sanders Jr.	6 ft 7 in (2.01 m)	217 lb (98 kg)	Sr	Gulliver Prep	Miami, FL
G	5	Raheem Braiton (W)	6 ft 0 in (1.83 m)	175 lb (79 kg)	Sr	Mishawaka	South Bend, IN
G	1	Julian Roper II	6 ft 4 in (1.93 m)	210 lb (95 kg)	Jr	St. Mary's Prep; Northwestern	Detroit, MI
F	22	Thomas Crowe (W)	6 ft 7 in (2.01 m)	220 lb (100 kg)	Jr	Archbishop Hoban	Macedonia, OH
G	20	J.R. Konieczny	6 ft 7 in (2.01 m)	204 lb (93 kg)	RS So	St. Joseph	South Bend, IN
G	4	Alex Wade	6 ft 0 in (1.83 m)	173 lb (78 kg)	RS So	Cathedral Catholic	San Diego, CA
F	14	Kebba Njie	6 ft 10 in (2.08 m)	254 lb (115 kg)	So	La Lumiere; Penn State	Centerville, OH
F	13	Tae Davis	6 ft 9 in (2.06 m)	208 lb (94 kg)	So	Warren Central; Seton Hall	Indianapolis, IN
G	10	JT Kelly (W)	6 ft 2 in (1.88 m)	180 lb (82 kg)	So	Ponte Vedra	Ponte Vedra Beach, FL
G	15	Thomas Hattan (W)	6 ft 2 in (1.88 m)	180 lb (82 kg)	So	San Juan Hills	San Clemente, CA
F	23	Zane Harbaugh (W)	6 ft 6 in (1.98 m)	210 lb (95 kg)	So	Owasso	Owasso, OK
G	3	Markus Burton	5 ft 11 in (1.8 m)	166 lb (75 kg)	Fr	Penn	Mishawaka, IN
G	11	Braeden Shrewsberry	6 ft 3 in (1.91 m)	189 lb (86 kg)	Fr	State College Area High	State College, PA
F	0	Carey Booth	6 ft 10 in (2.08 m)	203 lb (92 kg)	Fr	Brewster Academy	Englewood, CO
G	2	Logan Imes	6 ft 4 in (1.93 m)	189 lb (86 kg)	Fr	Zionsville	Zionsville, IN

Head coach

- Micah Shrewsberry (Hanover)

Assistant coach(es)

- Kyle Getter (Hanover)
- Mike Farrelly (Saint Joseph's)
- Ryan Owens (Southern Indiana)

Legend

- (C) Team captain
- (S) Suspended
- (I) Ineligible
- (W) Walk-on
- Injured
- Current redshirt

Roster

- Roster is subject to change as/if players transfer or leave the program for other reasons.
- Alex Wade was awarded a basketball scholarship ahead of the 2023–24 season.

== Schedule and results ==
Date time, TV	Rank^{#}	Opponent^{#}	Result	Record	High points	High rebounds	High assists	Site (attendance) city, state
Exhibition
November 1, 2023*; 7:00 p.m.		Hanover	W 96–62	–	18 – Burton	7 – Booth	3 – Imes	Joyce Center (4,628); South Bend, IN
Regular season
November 6, 2023*; 7:00 p.m., ACCNX/ESPN+		Niagara	W 70–63	1–0	29 – Burton	9 – Booth	4 – Burton	Joyce Center (7,338); South Bend, IN
November 11, 2023*; 7:00 p.m., ACCNX/ESPN+		Western Carolina	L 61–71	1–1	20 – Booth	8 – Roper	3 – Imes	Joyce Center (5,742); South Bend, IN
November 16, 2023*; 9:00 p.m., ESPN2		vs. Auburn; Legends Classic semifinals	L 59–83	1–2	18 – Konieczny	11 – Konieczny	2 – Tied	Barclays Center (5,524); Brooklyn, NY
November 17, 2023*; 4:30 p.m., ESPNU		vs. Oklahoma State; Legends Classic consolation game	W 66–64 ^{OT}	2–2	20 – Burton	10 – Konieczny	4 – Zona	Barclays Center (4,849); Brooklyn, NY
November 22, 2023*; 7:00 p.m., ACCNX/ESPN+		Maryland Eastern Shore	W 75–55	3–2	13 – Shrewsberry	6 – Burton	5 – Burton	Joyce Center (5,179); South Bend, IN
November 28, 2023*; 7:00 p.m., SECN		at South Carolina; ACC–SEC Challenge	L 53–65	3–3	15 – Davis	8 – Davis	5 – Burton	Colonial Life Arena (15,215); Columbia, SC
December 2, 2023; 12:00 p.m., The CW		at No. 8 Miami (FL)	L 49–62	3–4 (0–1)	14 – Konieczny	10 – Davis	6 – Burton	Watsco Center (7,972); Coral Gables, FL
December 5, 2023*; 7:00 p.m., ACCNX/ESPN+		Western Michigan	W 86–65	4–4	19 – Davis	10 – Davis	6 – Burton	Joyce Center (4,883); South Bend, IN
December 9, 2023*; 9:00 p.m., FOX		at No. 8 Marquette	L 59–78	4–5	20 – Burton	6 – Njie	2 – Tied	Fiserv Forum (17,519); Milwaukee, WI
December 16, 2023*; 2:15 p.m., The CW		Georgetown	L 68–72 ^{OT}	4–6	17 – Burton	8 – Konieczny	4 – Burton	Joyce Center (7,140); South Bend, IN
December 19, 2023*; 6:00 p.m., ACCN		The Citadel	L 45–65	4–7	18 – Konieczny	10 – Konieczny	3 – Burton	Joyce Center (4,377); South Bend, IN
December 22, 2023*; 8:00 p.m., ACCN		Marist	W 60–56	5–7	21 – Burton	6 – Booth	3 – Burton	Joyce Center (5,440); South Bend, IN
December 30, 2023; 12:00 p.m., ACCN		Virginia	W 76–54	6–7 (1–1)	17 – Tied	9 – Booth	8 – Burton	Joyce Center (7,784); South Bend, IN
January 3, 2024; 9:00 p.m., ACCN		NC State	L 52–54	6–8 (1–2)	18 – Burton	11 – Njie	4 – Burton	Joyce Center (4,727); South Bend, IN
January 6, 2024; 6:00 p.m., ACCN		No. 14 Duke	L 59–67	6–9 (1–3)	18 – Burton	10 – Njie	4 – Burton	Joyce Center (8,066); South Bend, IN
January 9, 2024; 9:00 p.m., ACCN		at Georgia Tech	W 75–68 ^{OT}	7–9 (2–3)	25 – Shrewsberry	11 – Konieczny	7 – Burton	McCamish Pavilion (3,729); Atlanta, GA
January 13, 2023; 2:15 p.m., The CW		Florida State	L 58–67	7–10 (2–4)	20 – Burton	8 – Njie	2 – Tied	Joyce Center (6,427); South Bend, IN
January 15, 2024; 7:00 p.m., ESPNU		at Boston College	L 59–63	7–11 (2–5)	19 – Burton	13 – Booth	3 – Burton	Conte Forum (6,348); Chestnut Hill, MA
January 24, 2024; 7:00 p.m., ESPN2		Miami (FL); Irish Wear Green	L 61–73	7–12 (2–6)	15 – Burton	6 – Konieczny	4 – Tied	Joyce Center (5,948); South Bend, IN
January 27, 2024; 12:00 p.m., ESPNU		Boston College	L 58–61	7–13 (2–7)	15 – Konieczny	8 – Konieczny	7 – Burton	Joyce Center (6,593); South Bend, IN
January 31, 2024; 7:00 p.m., ESPN2		at Virginia	L 53–65	7–14 (2–8)	16 – Burton	7 – Konieczny	4 – Burton	John Paul Jones Arena (13,947); Charlottesville, VA
February 3, 2024; 6:00 p.m., ACCN		at Pittsburgh	L 60–70	7–15 (2–9)	17 – Burton	6 – Imes	3 – Burton	Petersen Events Center (10,864); Pittsburgh, PA
February 7, 2024; 9:00 p.m., ACCN		at No. 9 Duke	L 53–71	7–16 (2–10)	19 – Burton	6 – Tied	4 – Burton	Cameron Indoor Stadium (9,314); Durham, NC
February 10, 2024; 6:00 p.m., The CW		Virginia Tech	W 74–66	8–16 (3–10)	16 – Burton	6 – Njie	8 – Burton	Joyce Center (7,394); South Bend, IN
February 14, 2024; 7:00 p.m., ACCN		Georgia Tech	W 58–55	9–16 (4–10)	18 – Burton	7 – Njie	5 – Burton	Joyce Center (4,589); South Bend, IN
February 21, 2024; 7:00 p.m., ESPNU		at Louisville	W 72–50	10–16 (5–10)	23 – Shrewsberry	7 – Booth	3 – Burton	KFC Yum! Center (11,342); Louisville, KY
February 24, 2024; 12:00 p.m., ESPN		at Syracuse	L 85–88	10–17 (5–11)	28 – Burton	7 – Tied	8 – Burton	JMA Wireless Dome (25,194); Syracuse, NY
February 27, 2024; 9:00 p.m., ACCN		Wake Forest	W 70–65	11–17 (6–11)	31 – Burton	6 – Tied	3 – Burton	Joyce Center (4,698); South Bend, IN
March 2, 2024; 7:45 p.m., The CW		Clemson	W 69–62	12–17 (7–11)	21 – Burton	6 – Burton	4 – Burton	Joyce Center (7,313); South Bend, IN
March 5, 2024; 7:00 p.m., ACCN		at No. 7 North Carolina	L 51–84	12–18 (7–12)	11 – Davis	6 – Tied	4 – Burton	Dean Smith Center (21,750); Chapel Hill, NC
March 9, 2024; 2:30 p.m., ESPNU		at Virginia Tech	L 76–82	12–19 (7–13)	24 – Burton	6 – Davis	4 – Burton	Cassell Coliseum (8,925); Blacksburg, VA
ACC tournament
March 12, 2024; 2:00 p.m., ACCN	(12)	vs. (13) Georgia Tech; First Round	W 84–80	13–19	23 – Shrewsbury	9 – Njie	8 – Burton	Capital One Arena (7,523); Washington, D.C.
March 13, 2024; 2:30 p.m., ACCN	(12)	vs. (5) Wake Forest; Second Round	L 59–72	13–20	21 – Burton	6 – Tied	3 – Burton	Capital One Arena (9,920); Washington, D.C.
*Non-conference game. ^{#}Rankings from AP Poll. (#) Tournament seedings in parentheses. All times are in Eastern Time.

== Rankings ==
Ranking movements Legend: — = Not ranked
	Week																				
Poll	Pre	1	2	3	4	5	6	7	8	9	10	11	12	13	14	15	16	17	18	19	Final
AP	—	—	—	—	—	—	—	—	—	—	—	—	—	—	—	—	—	—	—	—	—
Coaches	—	—	—	—	—	—	—	—	—	—	—	—	—	—	—	—	—	—	—	—	—
