= Braeden Shrewsberry =

American college basketball player (born 2006)

No. 11 – Notre Dame Fighting Irish
- Position: Shooting guard
- Conference: Atlantic Coast Conference

Personal information
- Born: February 7, 2006 (age 20)
- Listed height: 6 ft 4 in (1.93 m)
- Listed weight: 205 lb (93 kg)

Career information
- High school: West Lafayette (West Lafayette, Indiana); State College Area (State College, Pennsylvania)
- College: Notre Dame (2023–present)

Braeden J. Shrewsberry (born February 7, 2006) is an American college basketball player for the Notre Dame Fighting Irish of the Atlantic Coast Conference (ACC).

== Early life and high school ==
Shrewsberry grew up in Granger, Indiana and initially attended West Lafayette Junior-Senior High School. He transferred to State College Area High School in State College, Pennsylvania after his sophomore year following his father, Micah Shrewsberry, was hired as the head basketball coach at Penn State. Shrewsberry averaged 17.4 points, 4.7 rebounds, 3.8 assists, and 1.1 steals per game as a senior.

Shrewsberry was rated a three-star recruit and initially committed to play for his father at Penn State. He later flipped his commitment to Notre Dame following his father's hiring as the Fighting Irish's head coach.

== College career ==
Shrewsberry was an immediate starter with the Notre Dame Fighting Irish in his freshman season, but lost the role midseason. He finished the year averaging 10.2 points and 2.5 rebounds per game. Shrewsberry averaged 14 points and 3 rebounds per game as a sophomore in his first full year as a starter. He missed the last seven games of the season due to an abdomen injury.

== Career statistics ==
Legend
GP	Games played	GS	Games started	MPG	Minutes per game
FG%	Field goal percentage	3P%	3-point field goal percentage	FT%	Free throw percentage
RPG	Rebounds per game	APG	Assists per game	SPG	Steals per game
BPG	Blocks per game	PPG	Points per game	**Bold**	Career high

=== College ===
Year	Team	GP	GS	MPG	FG%	3P%	FT%	RPG	APG	SPG	BPG	PPG
2023–24	Notre Dame	**33**	15	28.3	.398	.371	.824	2.5	.9	.5	.0	10.2
2024–25	Notre Dame	26	26	**34.6**	**.413**	.369	**.829**	3.0	1.6	**.6**	**.2**	**14.0**
2025–26	Notre Dame	31	**31**	32.7	.390	**.402**	.778	**3.1**	**1.9**	.4	.1	11.9
Career		90	72	31.6	.400	.381	.806	2.8	1.5	.5	.1	11.9
