= Carson Towt =

American football player (born 2001)

No. 45 – Indianapolis Colts
- Position: Tight end
- Roster status: Injured reserve

Personal information
- Born: June 1, 2001 (age 25); Gilbert, Arizona, U.S.
- Listed height: 6 ft 8 in (2.03 m)
- Listed weight: 250 lb (113 kg)

Career information
- High school: Gilbert (Gilbert, Arizona)
- College: Northern Arizona (basketball; 2020–2025); Notre Dame (basketball; 2025–2026)
- NFL draft: 2025: undrafted

Career history
- Indianapolis Colts (2026–present)

Awards and highlights
- NCAA rebounding leader (2025); Second-team All-Big Sky (2025); Big Sky All-Defensive Team (2025)
- Stats at Pro Football Reference

Carson Christopher Towt (born June 1, 2001) is an American professional football tight end for the Indianapolis Colts of the National Football League (NFL). He played college basketball for the Northern Arizona Lumberjacks and the Notre Dame Fighting Irish. Despite not having played organized football in college or high school, Towt signed as an undrafted free agent with the Colts in 2026.

== Early life ==
Towt attended Gilbert High School. He started out as a guard before a late growth spurt transformed him into a power forward. Towt had no Division 1 scholarship offers out of high school and accepted a preferred walk-on position at Northern Arizona.

== College career ==
As a freshman, Towt averaged 5.6 points and 4.6 rebounds per game. He improved those numbers to 8.4 points and 8.8 rebounds per game as a sophomore. As a junior, Towt averaged 10.1 points and 7.8 rebounds per game. He sat out the 2023-24 season with an injury before averaging 13.3 points and a nation-leading 12.4 rebounds per game as a senior. Towt recorded 20 double-doubles, tied for sixth nationally. He was named to the Second Team All-Big Sky as well as the All-Defensive Team. Following the season he transferred to Notre Dame, taking advantage of an additional year of eligibility. Towt averaged 5.9 points and 9.0 rebounds per game on a team that finished 13-18.

== Professional career ==
On March 17, 2026, Towt signed with the Indianapolis Colts. He was placed on injured reserve on August 18, 2026.

== Career statistics ==
Legend
GP	Games played	GS	Games started	MPG	Minutes per game
FG%	Field goal percentage	3P%	3-point field goal percentage	FT%	Free throw percentage
RPG	Rebounds per game	APG	Assists per game	SPG	Steals per game
BPG	Blocks per game	PPG	Points per game	**Bold**	Career high

*	Led NCAA Division I

=== College ===
Year	Team	GP	GS	MPG	FG%	3P%	FT%	RPG	APG	SPG	BPG	PPG
2019–20	Northern Arizona	Redshirt										
2020–21	Northern Arizona	22	19	21.3	.531	—	**.512**	4.6	1.3	.5	**.6**	5.6
2021–22	Northern Arizona	32	32	29.7	.487	—	.463	8.8	**3.7**	.6	.3	8.4
2022–23	Northern Arizona	**35**	**35**	28.3	.532	.000	.400	7.8	3.0	.6	.3	10.1
2023–24	Northern Arizona	Redshirt										
2024–25	Northern Arizona	34	34	**33.7**	.569	—	.379	**12.4***	3.4	**1.1**	.4	**13.3**
2025–26	Notre Dame	31	31	26.0	**.610**	—	.321	9.0	1.7	.6	.4	5.9
Career		154	151	28.3	.544	.000	.409	8.8	2.7	.7	.4	9.0
