= Carey Booth =

American basketball player (born 2005)

No. 0 – Colorado State Rams
- Position: Power forward / center
- Conference: Mountain West Conference

Personal information
- Born: July 18, 2005 (age 21) Cleveland, Ohio, U.S.
- Listed height: 6 ft 10 in (2.08 m)
- Listed weight: 215 lb (98 kg)

Career information
- High school: Cherry Creek (Greenwood Village, Colorado); Brewster Academy (Wolfeboro, New Hampshire)
- College: Notre Dame (2023–2024); Illinois (2024–2025); Colorado State (2025–present)

Carey Lawrence Booth (born July 18, 2005) is an American college basketball player for the Colorado State Rams of the Mountain West Conference (MWC). He previously played for the Notre Dame Fighting Irish and Illinois Fighting Illini.

== Early life and high school ==
Booth grew up in Englewood, Colorado, and attended Cherry Creek High School. He averaged 10.6 points and 7.7 rebounds per game as a junior. Booth transferred to Brewster Academy in Wolfeboro, New Hampshire, after his junior year at Cherry Creek.

Booth was rated a four-star recruit and initially committed to play college basketball at Penn State, where his father had played, over offers from Texas, Ohio State, and Stanford. He later requested a release following the departure of head coach Micah Shrewsberry, who left to coach Notre Dame. Booth later committed to play for Shrewsberry at Notre Dame.

== College career ==
Booth entered his freshman season at Notre Dame as a reserve forward. He made his collegiate debut in Fighting Irish's season opener against Niagara and scored ten points with nine rebounds and one block in 21 minutes played. Following his freshman season, Booth transferred to Illinois. Following his sophomore season at Illinois, Booth transferred to Colorado State.

== Career statistics ==
Legend
GP	Games played	GS	Games started	MPG	Minutes per game
FG%	Field goal percentage	3P%	3-point field goal percentage	FT%	Free throw percentage
RPG	Rebounds per game	APG	Assists per game	SPG	Steals per game
BPG	Blocks per game	PPG	Points per game	**Bold**	Career high

=== College ===
Year	Team	GP	GS	MPG	FG%	3P%	FT%	RPG	APG	SPG	BPG	PPG
2023–24	Notre Dame	**33**	**19**	**19.9**	**.391**	**.297**	**.634**	**4.3**	**0.5**	**0.2**	**0.6**	**6.4**
2024–25	Illinois	21	0	5.1	.273	.240	.500	1.0	0.0	0.0	0.2	1.2

== Personal life ==
Booth's father, Calvin Booth, played in the NBA for ten seasons and is the former general manager of the Denver Nuggets.
