= Jalen Haralson =

American basketball player (born 2007)

No. 10 – Tennessee Volunteers
- Position: Small forward
- Conference: Southeastern Conference

Personal information
- Born: April 30, 2007 (age 19)
- Listed height: 6 ft 7 in (2.01 m)
- Listed weight: 220 lb (100 kg)

Career information
- High school: Fishers (Fishers, Indiana); La Lumiere School (La Porte, Indiana)
- College: Notre Dame (2025–2026); Tennessee (2026–present)

Career highlights
- McDonald's All-American (2025); Jordan Brand Classic (2025); Nike Hoop Summit (2025)
Medals
Men's basketball
Representing United States
FIBA U17 World Cup
Gold medal – first place	2024 Turkey	Team

Jalen Tyree Haralson (born April 30, 2007) is an American college basketball player for the Tennessee Volunteers of the Southeastern Conference (SEC). He previously played for the Notre Dame Fighting Irish.

== Early life and high school career ==
Haralson grew up in Anderson, Indiana and initially attended Fishers High School. He averaged 23.4 points, 7.7 rebounds, and 3.9 assists per game as a sophomore. After the season, Haralson transferred to the La Lumiere School. He averaged nine points, 4.6 rebounds, and 4.1 assists in eight games during his junior season. After his first year at the school, Haralson played in the Nike Elite Youth Basketball League (EYBL) for the Indy Heat, an Amateur Athletic Union team, and averaged 21.2 points and 7.3 rebounds per game.

=== Recruiting ===
Haralson was a consensus four-star recruit and one of the top players in the 2025 class, according to major recruiting services. He committed to playing college basketball for Notre Dame over offers from Indiana and Michigan State. Haralson is the highest-rated recruit in program history.

College recruiting
Name	Hometown	School	Height	Weight	Commit date
Jalen Haralson; SF	Anderson, IN	La Lumiere School (IN)	6 ft 7 in (2.01 m)	210 lb (95 kg)	Sep 25, 2024
Jalen Haralson; SF	Recruit ratings: Rivals: 247Sports: On3: ESPN: (89)				
Overall recruit ranking: Rivals: 17 247Sports: 18 On3: 31 ESPN: 19
Note: In many cases, Scout, Rivals, 247Sports, On3, and ESPN may conflict in their listings of height and weight.; In these cases, the average was taken. ESPN grades are on a 100-point scale.; Sources: "Notre Dame 2025 Basketball Commitments". Rivals.; "2025 Notre Dame Fighting Irish Recruiting Class". ESPN.; "2025 Team Ranking". Rivals.

== College career ==
Haralson enrolled at the University of Notre Dame for the 2025–26 season as one of the highest-rated recruits in program history. He made an immediate impact as a freshman for the Notre Dame Fighting Irish, earning a starting role early in the season and emerging as one of the team's primary scoring options.

During his freshman season, Haralson appeared in 27 games, making 23 starts, and averaged 16.2 points, four rebounds, and 2.6 assists per game while playing 26.6 minutes per contest. He shot 51.5 percent from the field, showcasing efficiency as a slashing wing and interior scorer.

Haralson's combination of size, athleticism, and scoring ability allowed him to contribute across multiple facets of the game, often serving as a focal point of Notre Dame's offense. His performances earned him All-ACC honorable mention honors at the conclusion of the season.

Following the conclusion of his freshman season, Haralson entered the NCAA transfer portal and later transferred to the Tennessee Volunteers ahead of the 2026–27 season.

== National team career ==
Haralson played for the United States under-17 basketball team at the 2024 FIBA Under-17 Basketball World Cup. He averaged 11.1 points, four rebounds, and 2.3 assists per game as the United States won the gold medal.

== Career statistics ==
Legend
GP	Games played	GS	Games started	MPG	Minutes per game
FG%	Field goal percentage	3P%	3-point field goal percentage	FT%	Free throw percentage
RPG	Rebounds per game	APG	Assists per game	SPG	Steals per game
BPG	Blocks per game	PPG	Points per game	**Bold**	Career high

=== College ===
Year	Team	GP	GS	MPG	FG%	3P%	FT%	RPG	APG	SPG	BPG	PPG
2025–26	Notre Dame	27	23	26.6	.515	.200	.674	4.0	2.6	.5	.3	16.2
