= California Baptist Lancers men's basketball =

2026–27 California Baptist Lancers men's basketball team
- University: California Baptist University
- Head coach: Kyle Getter (1st season)
- Location: Riverside, California
- Arena: Fowler Events Center (capacity: 6,000)
- Conference: Big West
- Nickname: Lancers
- Colors: Navy blue and gold

NCAA Division I tournament appearances
- 2026

NCAA Division II tournament Elite Eight
- 2018
Other NCAA Division II tournament results
Sweet Sixteen	2015, 2018
Appearances	2014, 2015, 2016, 2017, 2018,

NAIA tournament second round
- 2005, 2008

NAIA tournament appearances
- 1976, 2005, 2007, 2008

Conference tournament champions
- Pacific West: 2016; WAC: 2026

Conference regular-season champions
- Pacific West: 2014, 2016

The California Baptist Lancers men's basketball team represents California Baptist University in the Western Athletic Conference. The team made the jump into Division I basketball on July 1, 2018. They are led by head coach Kyle Getter and play at the Fowler Events Center, which opened in 2017 and replaced the Van Dyne Gym. The Lancers made their first ever appearance in the NCAA Division I men's basketball tournament in 2026.

== History ==
The men's basketball program began playing at the NAIA level in 1969 and stayed at that level until 2010, competing in the Golden State Athletic Conference. In 2010, California Baptist moved up in all sports to the NCAA Division II, joining the Pacific West Conference in all sports on July 1, 2011. In January 2017, the California Baptist Lancers announced their transition to NCAA Division I, joining the Western Athletic Conference on July 1, 2018, for all sports. The school became eligible for the NCAA Division I postseason tournament in the 2022–23 season.

== Postseason results ==
=== NCAA Division I results ===
The Lancers participated for the first time in the 2026 NCAA Division I men's basketball tournament.

Year	Seed	Round	Opponent	Result
2026	#13	Round of 64	#4 Kansas	L 68–60

=== College Basketball Invitational (CBI) results ===
The Lancers have appeared in the College Basketball Invitational (CBI) twice. Their record is 0–2.

Year	Seed	Round	Opponent	Result
2019		First round	Loyola Marymount	L 55–56
2022	#15	First round	Middle Tennessee	L 58–64

=== NCAA Division II tournament results ===
The Lancers have appeared in 5 NCAA Division II Tournaments. Their combined record is 7–5.

Year	Round	Opponent	Result
2014	Regional Quarterfinals	Chico State	L 71–77
2015	Regional Quarterfinals; Regional semifinals Regional Finals	Chico State; Seattle Pacific; Azusa Pacific	W 67–61; W 78–77; L 79–91
2016	Regional Quarterfinals; Regional semifinals	Cal Poly Pomona; UC San Diego	W 70–63; L 69–71
2017	Regional Quarterfinals; Regional semifinals	San Francisco State; UC San Diego	W 71–50; L 80–84
2018	Regional Quarterfinals; Regional semifinals Regional Finals; Elite Eight	UC San Diego; Azusa Pacific; Western Oregon; Queens	W 81–67; W 72–68; W 80–76; L 94–100

=== NAIA tournament results ===
Year	Seed	Round	Opponent	Result
1976	10	First round Second Round	Husson; Lincoln Memorial	W 95–81; L 78–107
2005		First round Second Round	# 13 Lubbock Christian # 4 Robert Morris (IL)	W 77–66; L 71–105
2007		First round	# 12 Lubbock Christian	L 77–105
2008	10	First round Second Round	Xavier (LA); Oklahoma City	W 77–69; L 63–69

== See also ==
- California Baptist Lancers women's basketball
