= Markus Burton =

American basketball player (born 2004)

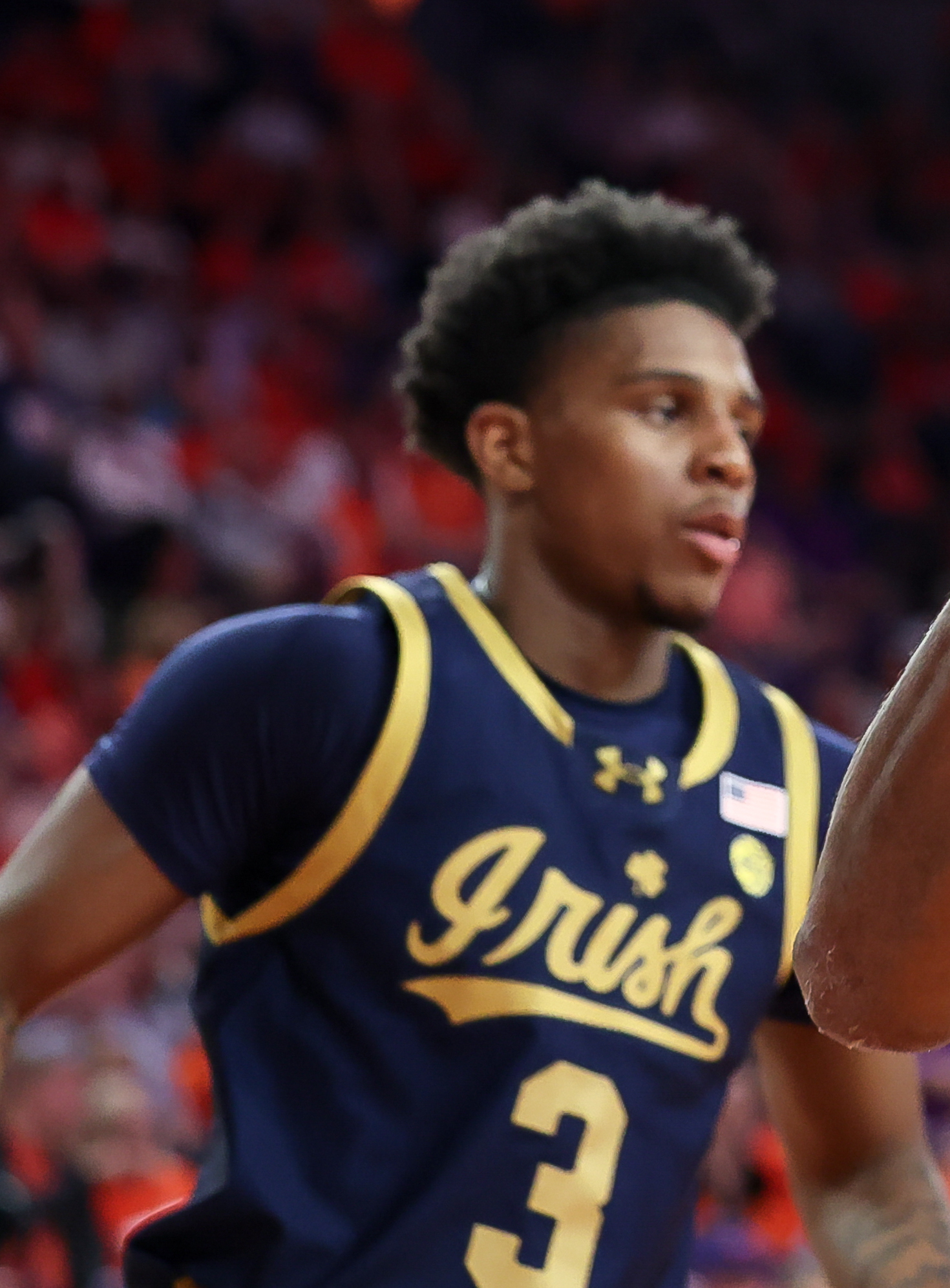

No. 5 – Indiana Hoosiers
- Position: Point guard
- Conference: Big Ten Conference

Personal information
- Born: October 3, 2004 (age 22)
- Listed height: 6 ft 0 in (1.83 m)
- Listed weight: 180 lb (82 kg)

Career information
- High school: Penn (Mishawaka, Indiana)
- College: Notre Dame (2023–2026); Indiana (2026–present)

Career highlights
- Second-team All-ACC (2025); Third-team All-ACC (2024); ACC Rookie of the Year (2024); ACC All-Rookie team (2024); Indiana Mr. Basketball (2023)
Medals
Men's basketball
Representing United States
FISU America Games
Gold medal – first place	2026 Peru	Team competition

Markus Lamonte Burton Jr. (born October 3, 2004) is an American college basketball player for the Indiana Hoosiers of the Big Ten Conference. He previously played for the Notre Dame Fighting Irish.

== Early life ==
Burton grew up in Mishawaka, Indiana and attended Penn High School. He was named Indiana Mr. Basketball as a senior after averaging a state-high 30.3 points per game. Burton committed to playing college basketball for Notre Dame over offers from Ball State, Purdue Fort Wayne, Illinois-Chicago, and Miami (Ohio).

== College career ==
Burton entered his freshman season at Notre Dame as the starting point guard. He averaged 17.5 points, 3.3 rebounds, 4.3 assists, and 1.9 steals per game during his freshman season. Burton was named third-team All-Atlantic Coast Conference (ACC) and the ACC Rookie of the Year at the end of the season. He averaged 21.3 points per game as a sophomore and was named to the second team All-ACC, Burton suffered a broken ankle as a junior which limited him to 10 games. He averaged 18.5 points, 3.7 assists, 2.8 rebounds, and 1.6 steals per game. Following the season Burton transferred to Indiana University.

== National team career ==
Burton was a part of the Indiana team chosen to represent the United States in the 2026 FISU America Games in Lima, Peru. He helped the U.S. capture the gold medal after winning all four games with an average victory margin of 60.8 points.

== Career statistics ==
Legend
GP	Games played	GS	Games started	MPG	Minutes per game
FG%	Field goal percentage	3P%	3-point field goal percentage	FT%	Free throw percentage
RPG	Rebounds per game	APG	Assists per game	SPG	Steals per game
BPG	Blocks per game	PPG	Points per game	**Bold**	Career high

=== College ===
Year	Team	GP	GS	MPG	FG%	3P%	FT%	RPG	APG	SPG	BPG	PPG
2023–24	Notre Dame	**33**	**33**	**33.8**	.421	.300	.821	3.3	**4.3**	**1.9**	**.2**	17.5
2024–25	Notre Dame	26	25	33.7	.442	**.375**	.848	**3.6**	3.0	1.7	.1	**21.3**
2025–26	Notre Dame	10	10	30.1	**.489**	.306	**.917**	2.8	3.7	1.6	.1	18.5
2026–27	Indiana											
Career		69	68	33.2	.438	.332	.847	3.4	3.8	1.8	.1	19.1
