= Micah Shrewsberry =

American basketball coach (born 1976)

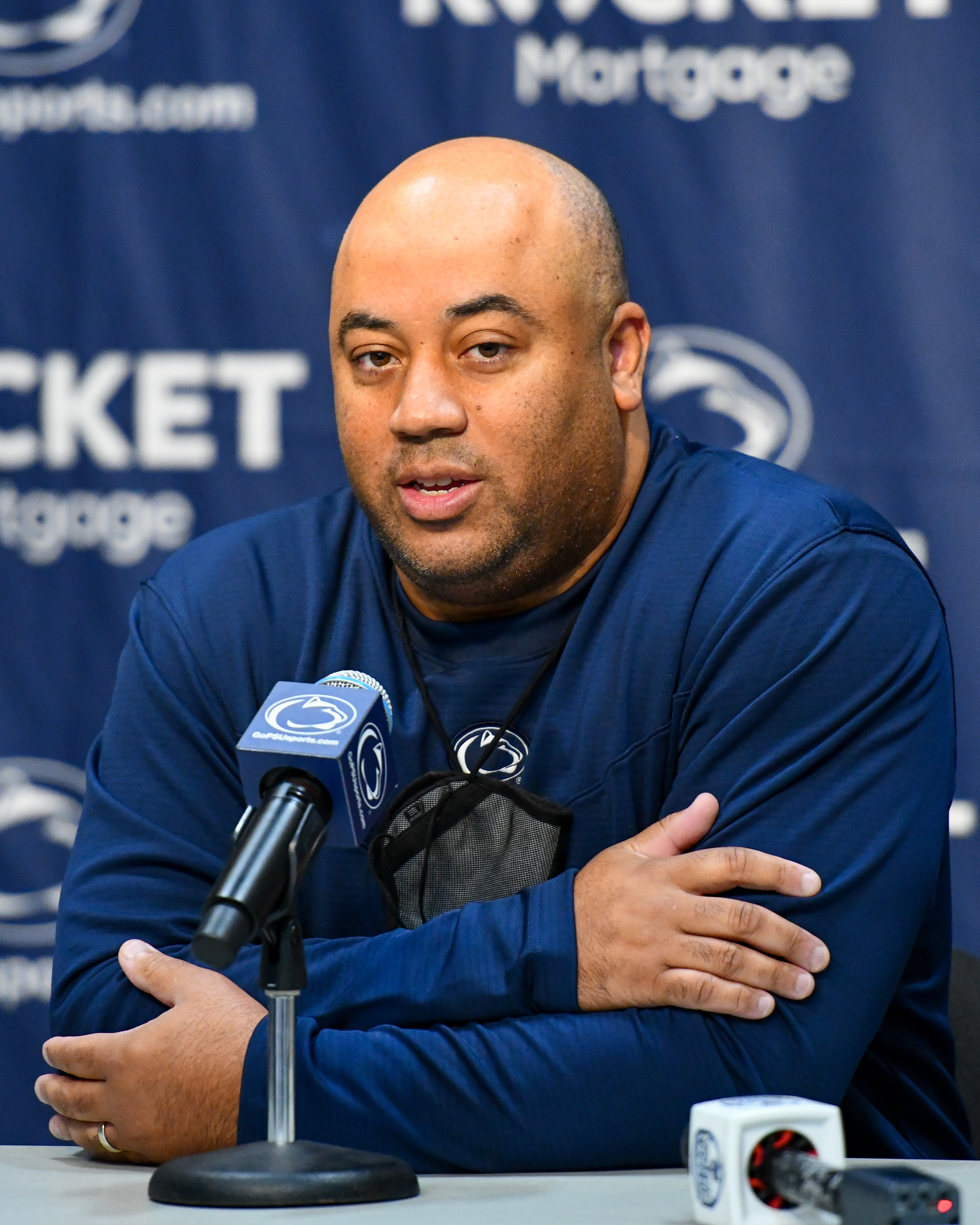
- Shrewsberry at Penn State in 2021

Current position
- Title: Head coach
- Team: Notre Dame
- Conference: ACC
- Record: 47–57 (.452)

Biographical details
- Born: July 31, 1976 (age 50); Indianapolis, Indiana, U.S.

Playing career
- 1995–1999: Hanover

Coaching career (HC unless noted)
- 1999–2000: Wabash (assistant)
- 2001–2003: DePauw (assistant)
- 2005–2007: Indiana–South Bend
- 2007–2011: Butler (assistant)
- 2011–2013: Purdue (assistant)
- 2013–2019: Boston Celtics (assistant)
- 2019–2021: Purdue (assistant)
- 2021–2023: Penn State
- 2023–present: Notre Dame

Administrative career (AD unless noted)
- 2003–2005: Marshall (dir. basketball ops.)

Head coaching record
- Overall: 99–136 (.421)
- Tournaments: 1–1 (NCAA Division I)

Micah William Shrewsberry (born July 31, 1976) is an American basketball coach and former college basketball player who is the head coach of the Notre Dame Fighting Irish of the Atlantic Coast Conference (ACC). He previously served as head coach of the Penn State Nittany Lions.

== Playing career ==
Shrewsberry attended Cathedral High School in Indianapolis, Indiana, and played collegiately at Hanover College where he was a three-year starter and tri-captain, while leading the league in free throw percentage and assists during the 1998–99 season.

== Coaching career ==
After his playing career, Shrewsberry had assistant coaching stops at Wabash and DePauw before joining the coaching staff at Marshall for two seasons under Ron Jirsa. In 2005, Indiana University South Bend named Shrewsberry their head coach. He served until 2007, when he joined Brad Stevens' staff at Butler. While with the Bulldogs, Shrewsberry was part of the program's back-to-back NCAA national runner-up coaching staffs.

In 2011, Shrewsberry joined Purdue's coaching staff, where he was credited for helping lead the Purdue Boilermakers to 8.74 turnovers per game, a nation-leading effort. He reunited with Stevens in the NBA ranks, joining the Boston Celtics coaching staff, helping the Celtics to five playoff appearances, including back-to-back Eastern Conference finals. On May 9, 2019, Shrewsberry returned to Purdue as an associate head coach.

=== Penn State ===
On March 15, 2021, Penn State named Shrewsberry as the 14th head coach in program history.

In just his second season coaching the Nittany Lions, Shrewsberry led the team to a 23–14 record, which saw it finish as runner-up to Purdue in the B1G Tournament and earn its first NCAA Tournament appearance since 2011, where it defeated Texas A&M in the first round and narrowly lost to #2-seed Texas in the round of 32, 71–66. The victory over Texas A&M was Penn State's first NCAA Tournament win since 2001. The team set a B1G record for most 3-pointers made in a season and star guard, Jalen Pickett, earned second team All-America honors, the first Nittany Lion to do so since 1954.

Shrewsberry collected more Big Ten wins (17) in his first two seasons than any other Penn State head coach.

=== Notre Dame ===
On March 23, 2023, Notre Dame named Shrewsberry the 18th head coach in program history. On January 2, 2026, Shrewsbury chased after an official and had to be restrained by Notre Dame forward Matthew MacLellan following a 72–71 loss to Cal.

== Personal life ==
Shrewsberry graduated from Cathedral High School. He earned a B.A. from Hanover College and a master's degree in sports management from Indiana State University. He and his wife, Molly, have four children including Braeden and Nick, who currently play for him at Notre Dame.

== Head coaching record ==
He coached at an Indiana University branch campus, Indiana University South Bend, upon embarking on his journey as a coach. He was the first-ever full-time coach in IU South Bend men's basketball history, improving in wins in his second and last season at the helm of the Titans.

After returning to assistant coaching with successful stints at Purdue (2011–13, 2019–21) and in the NBA with the Boston Celtics (2013–19), Shrewsberry took over the Penn State men's basketball program in March 2021. The Nittany Lions went 14–17 in Shrewsberry's first season and followed that with a 23-win 2022-23 campaign which earned the Nittany Lions' their first NCAA Tournament berth since 2011. A late, five-game winning streak over fellow NCAA Tournament teams Northwestern (twice), Illinois, Maryland, and Indiana secured Penn State's at-large berth and fueled a run to the Big Ten Tournament Championship game. The Nittany Lions then defeated Texas A&M in the opening round of the NCAA tournament – the program's first Tournament win since 2001 – before falling to Big XII Tournament champion Texas in the round of 32.

On March 23, 2023, Shrewsberry was named the next head coach of Notre Dame.

Record table
Season	Team	Overall	Conference	Standing	Postseason
Indiana–South Bend Titans (Chicagoland Collegiate Athletic Conference) (2005–2007)
2005–06	Indiana–South Bend	3–28	1–11	10th	CCAC Tournament Quarterfinal
2006–07	Indiana–South Bend	12–20	4–6	T–4th	CCAC Tournament Quarterfinal
Indiana–South Bend:		15–48 (.238)	5–17 (.227)		
Penn State Nittany Lions (Big Ten Conference) (2021–2023)
2021–22	Penn State	14–17	7–13	T–10th	
2022–23	Penn State	23–14	10–10	T–9th	NCAA Division I Round of 32
Penn State:		37–31 (.544)	17–23 (.425)		
Notre Dame Fighting Irish (Atlantic Coast Conference) (2023–present)
2023–24	Notre Dame	13–20	7–13	T–12th	
2024–25	Notre Dame	15–18	8–12	T–9th	
2025–26	Notre Dame	13–18	4–14	T–16th	
2026–27	Notre Dame	6–1	0–0		
Notre Dame:		47–57 (.452)	19–39 (.328)		
Total:		99–136 (.421)			
