= Dane Goodwin =

American basketball player (born 1999)

No. 23 – Grand Rapids Gold
- Position: Shooting guard / small forward
- League: NBA G League

Personal information
- Born: December 28, 1999 (age 26) Upper Arlington, Ohio, U.S.
- Listed height: 6 ft 6 in (1.98 m)
- Listed weight: 214 lb (97 kg)

Career information
- High school: Upper Arlington (Upper Arlington, Ohio)
- College: Notre Dame (2018–2023)
- NBA draft: 2023: undrafted
- Playing career: 2023–present

Career history
- 2023–2024: Stockton Kings
- 2024–2025: Salt Lake City Stars
- 2025–present: Grand Rapids Gold

Career highlights
- Third-team All-ACC (2022)
- Stats at NBA.com
- Stats at Basketball Reference

Dane Michael Goodwin (born December 28, 1999) is an American professional basketball player for the Grand Rapids Gold of the NBA G League. He played college basketball for the Notre Dame Fighting Irish.

== High school career ==
Goodwin attended Upper Arlington High School at Upper Arlington, Ohio where he led the Golden Bears to three OCC championships and two district titles while compiling an 87–15 record. He set the school's career records for points with 1,951 and rebounds with 817 while being named to several honors such as 2018 Ohio Mr. Basketball, 2018 Gatorade Ohio Player of the Year, 2018 USA Today Ohio Player of the Year and 2018 Third-Team USA Today All-American.

== College career ==
Goodwin played his college career at Notre Dame where he played five seasons and played in 158 games, starting 94, while averaging 10.8 points and 4.4 rebounds on .441/.391/.823 shooting splits. In his last season, he played in 32 games and averaged 11.3 points, 5.1 rebounds and 2.0 assists per contest while shooting 43.5% from the field and 38.8% from beyond the arc.

== Professional career ==
After going undrafted in the 2023 NBA draft, Goodwin joined the Sacramento Kings for the 2023 NBA Summer League and on October 19, 2023, he signed with the team. However, he was waived the next day and later joined the Stockton Kings. He played in 40 games, starting 18, and averaged 6.4 points, 3.5 rebounds and 1.4 assists in 20.9 minutes.

After joining the Sacramento Kings for the 2024 NBA Summer League, Goodwin signed with the Utah Jazz on September 23, 2024. However, he was waived two days later and on October 28, he joined the Salt Lake City Stars.

For the 2025–26 season, he joined the Grand Rapids Gold.

== Personal life ==
The son of Danielle and Damon Goodwin, he has a brother and a sister. His father played basketball at the University of Dayton from 1982 until 1986 before being drafted by the Phoenix Suns in the 1986 NBA draft; he later became the all-time winningest head coach at Capital University.
