= Kyle Getter =

American basketball coach (born 1979)

Current position
- Title: Head coach
- Team: California Baptist
- Conference: Big West
- Record: 1–3 (.250)

Biographical details
- Born: April 4, 1979 (age 47); Miamisburg, Ohio, U.S.
- Education: Centre College (1999)

Playing career
- 1997–1999: Centre

Coaching career (HC unless noted)
- 1999–2002: Hanover (SM/assistant)
- 2002–2003: Dayton (assistant)
- 2003–2005: Wright State (assistant)
- 2007–2008: Walsh (assistant)
- 2008–2009: Liberty (assistant)
- 2011–2015: Radford (assistant)
- 2015–2018: Liberty (assistant)
- 2021–2023: Virginia (assistant)
- 2023–2026: Notre Dame (associate HC)
- 2026–present: California Baptist

Administrative career (AD unless noted)
- 2005–2007: Marshall (dir. basketball ops.)
- 2009–2011: VCU (dir. basketball ops.)
- 2018–2021: Virginia (dir. recruiting/player dev.)

Head coaching record
- Overall: 1–3 (.250)

Kyle Patrick Getter (born April 4, 1979) is an American college basketball coach who is the head coach of the California Baptist Lancers of the Big West Conference.

== Coaching career ==
In April 2026, Getter received his first head coaching position when he was named head coach at California Baptist University. He had previously served as an assistant coach at numerous other schools for more than two decades.

== Head coaching record ==
Record table
Season	Team	Overall	Conference	Standing	Postseason
California Baptist (Big West Conference) (2026–present)
2026–27	California Baptist	1–3	0–0		
California Baptist:		1–3 (.250)	0–0 (–)		
Total:		1–3 (.250)			
National champion Postseason invitational champion Conference regular season champion Conference regular season and conference tournament champion Division regular season champion Division regular season and conference tournament champion Conference tournament champion
