= La Lumiere School =

Location
- 6801 N. Wilhelm Road; La Porte, Indiana 46350; United States; 41°42′29″N 86°42′50″W

Information
- Type: Private, day and boarding school
- Motto: Character, Scholarship, and Faith
- Religious affiliation: Catholic
- Established: 1963 (62 years ago)
- Founder: Raymond E. Daly
- Headmaster: Andy Webster
- Teaching staff: 23.8 (on a FTE basis)
- Grades: 9–12
- Gender: Co-educational
- Enrollment: 162 (2024-25)
- Student to teacher ratio: 7.0
- Campus size: 190 acres
- Campus type: Rural
- Colors: Navy & White
- Athletics: basketball, baseball, cross country, golf, soccer, tennis, volleyball
- Nickname: Lakers
- Accreditation: NCEA; NAIS
- Publication: The Massasauga
- Newspaper: The Torch
- Yearbook: Lamplighter
- Tuition: Day students: $23,500; Boarding students: $58,300
- Website: www.lalumiere.org

La Lumiere School is a Catholic, college-preparatory boarding and day school on a 190-acre campus in Springfield Township, LaPorte County, Indiana.

== History ==
The school was founded in 1963 by Raymond E. Daly and a group of Indiana friends and business associates who set out to form an independent, Catholic day school for boys. The founding group included James R. Moore, La Lumiere's first headmaster, Daly, Andrew J. McKenna, Frank J. Lanigan, Lex B. Wilkinson, A.J. Rumely, Charles F. Murphy, James F. Connaughton, Richard G. Schaub, and Walter F. Sheehan.

The land on which the school sits was owned by Edward Lalumier, an executive with the Armour Meat Packing Company in Chicago. He eventually became the namesake of the new institution.

== Affiliations and accreditation ==
La Lumiere School is affiliated with several educational associations:

- Catholic Boarding Schools Association (CBSA)
- National Association of Independent Schools (NAIS)
- The Association of Boarding Schools (TABS)
- Midwest Boarding Schools Association (MBSA)

La Lumiere School receives accreditation from the:

- Independent Schools Association of the Central States
- North Central Association

== Demographics ==
The demographic breakdown of the 215 students enrolled in 2013–14 was:

- Native American/Alaskan – 0.4%
- Asian/Pacific islanders – 0.9%
- Black – 10.7%
- Hispanic – 9.5%
- White – 81.4%
- Multiracial – 5.1%

== Notable alumni ==
- John P. Hiler (1971), US Representative from Indiana's 3rd congressional district
- John Roberts (1973), Chief Justice of the United States, appointed in 2005
- Paris Barclay (1974), Director, producer
- Jim Gaffigan (1984), Stand-up comedian and actor
- Ade Aruna (2013), professional football player, NFL
- Marin Marić (2013), professional basketball player
- Isaac Humphries (2015), professional basketball player, NBA
- James Banks III (2016), professional basketball player
- Brian Bowen (2017), professional basketball player, NBA
- Jaren Jackson Jr. (2017), professional basketball player, NBA All-Star
- Jordan Poole (2017), professional basketball player, NBA Champion
- Jeremiah Tilmon (2017), professional basketball player
- Tyger Campbell (2018), professional basketball player
- Kevin Zhang (2018 - transferred), professional basketball player
- Keion Brooks Jr. (2019), professional basketball player
- Emanuel Miller (2019 - transferred), professional basketball player, NBA
- Isaiah Stewart (2019), professional basketball player, NBA
- Wendell Green Jr. (2020), professional basketball player
- Jaden Ivey (2020), professional basketball player, NBA
- Jeremy Sochan (2021), professional basketball player, NBA
- JJ Starling (2022), college basketball player for the Buffalo Bulls
- Jeremy Fears Jr. (2023 - transferred), college basketball player for the Michigan State Spartans
- Aden Holloway (2023 - transferred), college basketball player for the Alabama Crimson Tide
- Ashlynn Shade (2023), college basketball player for the UConn Huskies
- Jalen Haralson (2025), basketball player for the Notre Dame Fighting Irish

== See also ==
- List of high schools in Indiana
