= Penn High School =

Location
- 56100 Bittersweet Road; Mishawaka, St. Joseph County, Indiana 46545; United States; 41.678802°N 86.108834°W

Information
- Type: Public High School
- Motto: Rigor. Relevance. Relationships.
- Established: 1958
- School district: Penn-Harris-Madison School Corporation
- CEEB code: 152347
- NCES School ID: 180603001060
- Principal: Rachael Fry
- Teaching staff: 181.50 (FTE)
- Grades: 9–12
- Enrollment: 3,847 (2023-2024)
- Student to teacher ratio: 21.20
- Colors: Black and gold
- Athletics conference: Northern Indiana Athletic Conference
- Team name: Kingsmen
- Newspaper: Penn News Network
- Website: Official Website

Penn High School is a public high school located in Mishawaka, Indiana, United States, near South Bend. It is the only high school in the Penn-Harris-Madison (PHM) School Corporation.

The district includes all of Osceola and portions of Granger, Mishawaka, and South Bend.

== History ==
Prior to the construction of Penn, students in the Penn and Harris Townships attended Mishawaka High School or Jimtown High School. In 1955, Mishawaka High School announced that it would no longer accept students from Penn Township due to overpopulation starting in 1959. Thus, Penn Township Trustee Vernon Freed created a community team to plan for a new high school. Ground was broken for the new high school on November 1, 1957. Penn High School was opened on September 1, 1958, after a year of construction and a cost of $3.6 million for freshmen, sophomores, and juniors. The first graduating class in 1960 had 200 seniors.

The 1962 merger of Penn and Harris Townships expanded the school system. The following year, Madison Township was also incorporated, creating today's Penn-Harris-Madison School district

Penn High School continued to expand in the following years. By 1963, more than 1,600 students attended schools in the district. In the mid-1980s, renovations began to enlarge the school's facilities and were completed in 1991.

== Academics ==
Penn High School students are divided into several academies. Freshmen are sorted into 6 freshman academies known as houses. Each house consists of roughly 160 students taught by the same core teachers. Prior to junior year, students choose to be a part of one of four academies: Fine arts, STEM, Management and Business, and Health and Human Services

Penn High School offers up to 23 Advanced Placement classes along with several Advanced College Project classes through a partnership with Indiana colleges. GPA is calculated on a 4.0 scale with college courses assigned a weighted grade that is on a 5.0 scale. Based on AP exam participation and passing rate, Penn students have a College Readiness Index of 30.0/100.0.

For the class of 2015, Penn achieved a graduation rate of over 97%. 90% of students passed the state's English graduation exam and 90% passed Indiana's math graduation exam. 66% of Penn students scored a three or higher on an Advanced Placement exam. Penn High School students averaged an SAT score of 1564 in 2010, compared to the Indiana state average of 1496.

Penn High School was recognized as a 4-Star School by the Indiana Department of Education for the 2012, 2013, 2014, and 2015 school years. To achieve this rating the school had to receive an "A" on the state's A-F accountability system, have an excellent ISTEP+ pass rate, carry on overall high graduation rate, and show that they were successful in closing achievement gaps.

== Demographics ==
The demographic breakdown of the 3,376 students enrolled for the 2014–2015 school year was:

- Male - 50.2%
- Female - 49.8%
- Native American/Alaskan - 0.6%
- Asian/Pacific islander - 5.1%
- Black - 4.2%
- Hispanic - 3.7%
- White - 82.4%
- Multiracial - 3.7%

In addition, 17.3% of the students were eligible for free or reduced price lunch.

== Extracurricular activities ==
=== Athletics ===
Penn is part of the Northern Indiana Athletic Conference. They compete under the name "Kingsmen" and the school colors are black and gold. The following IHSAA sanctioned sports are offered:

- Baseball (boys)
  - State champions - 1994, 1998, 2001, 2015, 2022, 2023
- Basketball (boys & girls)
  - Girls basketball state champions - 2016
- Cross country (boys & girls)
- Football (boys)
  - State champions - 1983, 1995, 1996, 1997, 2000
- Golf (boys & girls)
  - Girls state champions - 1994, 2002, 2004, 2005
- Soccer (boys & girls)
  - Boys state champions - 1999
  - Girls state champions - 2016, 2017
- Softball (girls)
  - State champions - 1999, 2023
- Swimming (boys & girls)
- Tennis (boys & girls)
- Track (boys & girls)
- Volleyball (girls)
  - State champions - 2010, 2011
- Wrestling (boys)
  - State champions - 2015

=== Academic competitions ===
Penn High School participates in the Indiana Academic Super Bowl, run by the Indiana Association of School Principals. The statewide competition consists of rounds of 25 multiple choice questions that students answer as a team. Teams from Penn have had several victories at the Super Bowl. They won in English in 2007, science in 2003 and 2010, and social studies in 2003, 2005, 2006, and 2008–2014. Additionally, the mock trial team advanced to the national championship in 2014 after winning the state championship.

Penn High School also participates in Indiana Academic Spell Bowl, which differs from a traditional spelling bee in that teams of nine individually spell 10 words each in written form. Penn has won or tied the State Spell Bowl Championship in 1999–2006, 2008–2010, 2012–2016 and 2019.

As of 2016, Penn has established a Technology Student Association Chapter. Penn's TSA Chapter competes in both the National and Indiana State Leadership Conferences and has had numerous victories at the Indiana TSA State Leadership Conference.

== Notable alumni ==
- Michael Alig - Prominent member of the Club Kids, charged with manslaughter in 1996.
- Markus Burton - basketball player
- Braxston Cave - American football player
- Andrea Drews - member of Olympic gold medal-winning women's volleyball team
- Bill Edgerton - Former professional baseball player (Kansas City Athletics, Seattle Pilots)
- Noma Gurich - Chief Justice of the Supreme Court of Oklahoma (2019)
- Sarah Hildebrandt - Olympic gold medal-winning wrestler
- Niko Kavadas - Current MLB First Basemen for the Los Angeles Angels
- Bryan Mattison - Former American football player
- Paul Moala - NFL linebacker for the Chicago Bears
- Tim Roemer - Former Member of Congress, representing Indiana's 3rd Congressional District, member of the 9/11 Commission, former United States Ambassador to India.
- Mike Rosenthal - retired NFL offensive tackle
- Julie Wainwright - Founder, ex-CEO of online marketplace The RealReal.
- Mackenzie Wood - Soccer player in the NWSL

== See also ==
- List of high schools in Indiana
