= Granger, Indiana =

- Census-designated place
- Location of Granger in St. Joseph County, Indiana.
- Coordinates: 41°44′18″N 86°08′06″W
- Country: United States
- State: Indiana
- County: St. Joseph
- Township: Clay, Harris

Area
  - Total: 24.68 sq mi (63.93 km^{2})
  - Land: 24.68 sq mi (63.92 km^{2})
  - Water: 0.0039 sq mi (0.01 km^{2})
- Elevation: 801 ft (244 m)

Population (2020)
  - Total: 30,337
  - Density: 1,229.2/sq mi (474.61/km^{2})
- Demonym: Granger
- Time zone: UTC-5 (Eastern (EST))
  - Summer (DST): UTC-4 (EDT)
- ZIP code: 46530
- Area code: 574
- FIPS code: 18-28800
- GNIS feature ID: 2393023

Granger is a census-designated place (CDP) in Clay and Harris townships, St. Joseph County, in the U.S. state of Indiana. As of the 2020 census, Granger had a population of 30,337. Penn-Harris-Madison School Corporation and the South Bend Community School Corporation maintain the public schools in the area. Granger is part of the South Bend–Mishawaka metropolitan area as well as the larger Michiana region.

== History ==
Granger was founded in 1883, and named after the Grangers fraternal organization. The Granger post office has been in operation since 1875.

== Geography ==
According to the United States Census Bureau, the CDP has a total area of 26.2 square miles (68 km^{2}), all land.

== Demographics ==
Historical population
| Census | Pop. | Note | %± |
|---|---|---|---|
| 1990 | 20,241 | | — |
| 2000 | 28,284 | | 39.7% |
| 2010 | 30,465 | | 7.7% |
| 2020 | 30,337 | | −0.4% |
U.S. Decennial Census

=== Racial and ethnic composition ===
Granger CDP, Indiana – Racial and ethnic composition Note: the US Census treats Hispanic/Latino as an ethnic category. This table excludes Latinos from the racial categories and assigns them to a separate category. Hispanics/Latinos may be of any race.
| Race / Ethnicity (NH = Non-Hispanic) | Pop 2000 | Pop 2010 | Pop 2020 | % 2000 | % 2010 | % 2020 |
|---|---|---|---|---|---|---|
| White alone (NH) | 26,376 | 27,036 | 24,745 | 93.25% | 88.74% | 81.57% |
| Black or African American alone (NH) | 493 | 766 | 991 | 1.74% | 2.51% | 3.27% |
| Native American or Alaska Native alone (NH) | 32 | 33 | 60 | 0.11% | 0.11% | 0.20% |
| Asian alone (NH) | 736 | 1,400 | 1,893 | 2.60% | 4.60% | 6.24% |
| Native Hawaiian or Pacific Islander alone (NH) | 7 | 29 | 23 | 0.02% | 0.10% | 0.08% |
| Other race alone (NH) | 20 | 50 | 153 | 0.07% | 0.16% | 0.50% |
| Mixed race or Multiracial (NH) | 279 | 418 | 1,255 | 0.99% | 1.37% | 4.14% |
| Hispanic or Latino (any race) | 341 | 733 | 1,217 | 1.21% | 2.41% | 4.01% |
| Total | 28,284 | 30,465 | 30,337 | 100.00% | 100.00% | 100.00% |

=== 2020 census ===
As of the 2020 census, Granger had a population of 30,337. The median age was 41.3 years. 26.6% of residents were under the age of 18 and 17.9% of residents were 65 years of age or older. For every 100 females there were 98.7 males, and for every 100 females age 18 and over there were 97.2 males age 18 and over.

98.0% of residents lived in urban areas, while 2.0% lived in rural areas.

There were 10,458 households in Granger, of which 38.3% had children under the age of 18 living in them. Of all households, 72.3% were married-couple households, 9.6% were households with a male householder and no spouse or partner present, and 14.6% were households with a female householder and no spouse or partner present. About 14.3% of all households were made up of individuals and 7.8% had someone living alone who was 65 years of age or older.

There were 10,816 housing units, of which 3.3% were vacant. The homeowner vacancy rate was 0.8% and the rental vacancy rate was 3.9%.

Racial composition as of the 2020 census
| Race | Number | Percent |
|---|---|---|
| White | 24,996 | 82.4% |
| Black or African American | 1,003 | 3.3% |
| American Indian and Alaska Native | 82 | 0.3% |
| Asian | 1,906 | 6.3% |
| Native Hawaiian and Other Pacific Islander | 23 | 0.1% |
| Some other race | 444 | 1.5% |
| Two or more races | 1,883 | 6.2% |
| Hispanic or Latino (of any race) | 1,217 | 4.0% |

=== 2000 census ===
As of the census of 2000, there were 28,284 people, 9,184 households, and 8,173 families residing in the CDP. The population density was 1,078.8 inhabitants per square mile (416.5/km^{2}). There were 9,401 housing units at an average density of 358.6 per square mile (138.5/km^{2}). The racial makeup of the CDP was 94.15% White, 1.74% African American, 0.12% Native American, 2.63% Asian, 0.02% Pacific Islander, 0.26% from other races, and 1.07% from two or more races. Hispanic or Latino of any race were 1.21% of the population.

There were 9,184 households, out of which 48.1% had children under the age of 18 living with them, 82.7% were married couples living together, 4.7% had a female householder with no husband present, and 11.0% were non-families. 9.1% of all households were made up of individuals, and 3.4% had someone living alone who was 65 years of age or older. The average household size was 3.06 and the average family size was 3.26.

In the CDP, the population was spread out, with 31.7% under the age of 18, 5.2% from 18 to 24, 27.2% from 25 to 44, 27.9% from 45 to 64, and 8.1% who were 65 years of age or older. The median age was 38 years. For every 100 females, there were 97.6 males. For every 100 females age 18 and over, there were 95.9 males.

The median income for a household in the CDP was $80,744, and the median income for a family was $83,171. Males had a median income of $61,255 versus $33,620 for females. The per capita income for the CDP was $31,367. About 1.0% of families and 1.4% of the population were below the poverty line, including 1.4% of those under age 18 and 1.2% of those age 65 or over.

== Education ==
Penn-Harris-Madison School Corporation serves most of Granger. South Bend Community School Corporation serves students in Clay Township in the western part of Granger. The far eastern tip of Granger located within Elkhart County and not in the CDP, is served by Elkhart Community Schools.

=== Public schools ===
The following schools, all of Penn-Harris-Madison lie within the boundaries of Granger:

- Discovery Middle School (6–8)
- Horizon Elementary School (K–5)
- Mary Frank Elementary School (K–5)
- Northpoint Elementary School (K–5)
- Prairie Vista Elementary School (K–5)

The respective schools serve the majority of the parts of Granger in Penn-Harris-Madison. Elsie Rogers and Walt Disney elementary schools and Schmucker Middle School, outside of Granger, serve other parts of Granger. All residents of the Penn-Harris-Madison district are zoned to Penn High School, which is not in Granger.

The school zoning for the South Bend district portion is as follows (none of these schools are in Granger):

- Darden Elementary School (In 2020: Tarkington Elementary School, which closed in 2021, with most students reassigned to Darden Elementary, and in the 2000s Swanson Elementary School)
- Edison Middle School
- Clay High School (closed 2024) and Adams High School serve portions.

=== Private schools ===
There are also various private schools located in and serving Granger.

- Calvary Christian School (K–3)
- Granger Christian School (K–12)
- Michiana Covenant Academy (K–12)
- Peace Lutheran School (K–8)
- St. Pius X Catholic School (K–8)

=== Public library ===
Granger has a public library, a branch of the Mishawaka-Penn-Harris Public Library system.

== Notable people ==
- Braxston Cave – former football player for the Detroit Lions
- Joe Donnelly – former U.S. Senator
- Michael Dvorak – former Indiana state representative and St. Joseph County, Indiana Prosecutor
- Ken Harrelson – former Major League Baseball player and retired announcer for the Chicago White Sox
- Ara Parseghian – former head coach of the Notre Dame Fighting Irish football team
- Rudy Yakym – U.S. Representative and former member of the Indiana Judicial Nominating Commission
