= Notre Dame Fighting Irish men's basketball =

Sports team representing the University of Notre Dame in Indiana

| 2026–27 Notre Dame Fighting Irish men's basketball team |
- University: University of Notre Dame
- First season: 1896–97; 130 years ago
- Athletic director: Pete Bevacqua
- Head coach: Micah Shrewsberry; 4th season, 41–56 (.423)
- Location: Notre Dame, Indiana
- Arena: Purcell Pavilion at the Joyce Center (capacity: 9,149)
- NCAA division: Division I
- Conference: ACC
- Nickname: Fighting Irish
- Colors: Blue and gold
- All-time record: 1,989–1,144–1 (.635)
- NCAA tournament record: 40–41 (.494)

NCAA Division I tournament Final Four
- 1978
Other NCAA Division I tournament results
| Elite Eight | 1953, 1954, 1958, 1978, 1979, 2015, 2016 |
| Sweet Sixteen | 1953, 1954, 1957, 1958, 1970, 1971, 1974, 1975, 1976, 1977, 1978, 1979, 1981, 1987, 2003, 2015, 2016 |
| Appearances | 1953, 1954, 1957, 1958, 1960, 1963, 1965, 1969, 1970, 1971, 1974, 1975, 1976, 1977, 1978, 1979, 1980, 1981, 1985, 1986, 1987, 1988, 1989, 1990, 2001, 2002, 2003, 2007, 2008, 2010, 2011, 2012, 2013, 2015, 2016, 2017, 2022 |

Pre-tournament Helms national champions
- 1926–27, 1935–36

Conference tournament champions
- ACC: 2015

Conference division champions
- Big East West: 2001

Uniforms
| Home | Away | Alternate |

The Notre Dame Fighting Irish men's basketball team is the intercollegiate men's basketball program representing the University of Notre Dame in Notre Dame, Indiana, United States. The program competes in the Atlantic Coast Conference of NCAA Division I. On September 12, 2012, Notre Dame announced they would be moving to the Atlantic Coast Conference; they joined the conference on July 1, 2013.

The school holds two retroactively awarded national championships in basketball from the Helms Foundation: for the 1927 (19–1 overall record) and 1936 (22–2–1 overall record) seasons. They have also played in the NCAA tournament 37 times, good for 9th all time, and reached the Final Four in 1978. The Irish hold the record for most Tournament appearances without a championship or championship game appearance, one of five teams (along with Texas, Temple, Illinois and Oklahoma) to have 30 or more appearances without a title and one of three teams (along with Texas and Temple) to have more than 30 appearances without either. They are also the first Big East team to go undefeated at home two straight seasons.

The Fighting Irish play their home games in the Purcell Pavilion at the Edmund P. Joyce Center. Since moving to the Purcell Pavilion in 1968, they have had 44 winning seasons, including 5 in which they were undefeated at home (1973, 1985, 2006, 2007, and 2010). Jeff Sagarin and ESPN listed the program 12th in the college basketball all-time rankings in the ESPN College Basketball Encyclopedia. The Fighting Irish are currently coached by Micah Shrewsberry.

== Postseason ==
=== NCAA tournament results ===
The Fighting Irish have appeared in the NCAA tournament 37 times.

| Year | Seed | Round | Opponent | Result |
|---|---|---|---|---|
| 1953 | | First Round; Sweet Sixteen; Elite Eight | Eastern Kentucky; Penn; Indiana | W 77–57; W 69–57; L 66–79 |
| 1954 | | First Round; Sweet Sixteen; Elite Eight | Loyola (LA); Indiana; Penn State | W 80–70; W 65–64; L 63–71 |
| 1957 | | First Round; Sweet Sixteen; Regional 3rd Place Game | Miami (OH); Michigan State; Pittsburgh | W 89–77; L 83–85; W 86–85 |
| 1958 | | First Round; Sweet Sixteen; Elite Eight | Tennessee Tech; Indiana; Kentucky | W 94–61; W 94–87; L 56–89 |
| 1960 | | First Round | Ohio | L 66–74 |
| 1963 | | First Round | Bowling Green | L 72–77 |
| 1965 | | First Round | Houston | L 98–99 |
| 1969 | | First Round | Miami (OH) | L 60–63 |
| 1970 | | First Round; Sweet Sixteen; Regional 3rd Place Game | Ohio; Kentucky; Iowa | W 112–82; L 99–109; L 106–121 |
| 1971 | | First Round; Sweet Sixteen; Regional 3rd Place Game | TCU; Drake; Houston | W 102–94; L 72–79^{OT} L 106–119 |
| 1974 | | First Round; Sweet Sixteen; Regional 3rd Place Game | Austin Peay; Michigan; Vanderbilt | W 108–66; L 68–77; W 118–88 |
| 1975 | | First Round; Sweet Sixteen; Regional 3rd Place Game | Kansas; Maryland; Cincinnati | W 77–71; L 71–83; L 87–95 |
| 1976 | | First Round; Sweet Sixteen | Cincinnati; Michigan | W 79–78; L 76–80 |
| 1977 | | First Round; Sweet Sixteen | Hofstra; North Carolina | W 90–83; L 77–79 |
| 1978 | | First Round; Sweet Sixteen; Elite Eight; Final Four; National 3rd Place Game | Houston; Utah; DePaul; Duke; Arkansas | W 100–77; W 69–56; W 84–64; L 86–90; L 69–71 |
| 1979 | #1 | Second Round; Sweet Sixteen; Elite Eight | #8 Tennessee #5 Toledo #2 Michigan State | W 73–67; W 79–71; L 68–80 |
| 1980 | #4 | Second Round | #5 Missouri | L 84–87^{OT} |
| 1981 | #2 | Second Round; Sweet Sixteen | #10 James Madison #6 BYU | W 54–45; L 50–51 |
| 1985 | #7 | First Round; Second Round | #10 Oregon State #2 North Carolina | W 79–70; L 58–60 |
| 1986 | #3 | First Round | #14 Arkansas–Little Rock | L 83–90 |
| 1987 | #5 | First Round; Second Round; Sweet Sixteen | #12 Middle Tennessee #4 TCU #1 North Carolina | W 84–71; W 58–57; L 68–74 |
| 1988 | #10 | First Round | #7 SMU | L 75–83 |
| 1989 | #9 | First Round; Second Round | #8 Vanderbilt #1 Georgetown | W 81–65; L 74–81 |
| 1990 | #10 | First Round | #7 Virginia | L 67–75 |
| 2001 | #6 | First Round; Second Round | #11 Xavier #3 Ole Miss | W 83–71; L 56–59 |
| 2002 | #8 | First Round; Second Round | #9 Charlotte #1 Duke | W 82–63; L 77–84 |
| 2003 | #5 | First Round; Second Round; Sweet Sixteen | #12 Milwaukee #4 Illinois #1 Arizona | W 70–69; W 68–60; L 71–88 |
| 2007 | #6 | First Round | #11 Winthrop | L 64–74 |
| 2008 | #5 | First Round; Second Round | #12 George Mason #4 Washington State | W 68–50; L 41–61 |
| 2010 | #6 | First Round | #11 Old Dominion | L 50–51 |
| 2011 | #2 | Second Round; Third Round | #15 Akron #10 Florida State | W 69–56; L 57–71 |
| 2012 | #7 | Second Round | #10 Xavier | L 63–67 |
| 2013 | #7 | Second Round | #10 Iowa State | L 58–76 |
| 2015 | #3 | Second Round; Third Round; Sweet Sixteen; Elite Eight | #14 Northeastern #6 Butler #7 Wichita State #1 Kentucky | W 69–65; W 67–64^{OT} W 81–70; L 66–68 |
| 2016 | #6 | First Round; Second Round; Sweet Sixteen; Elite Eight | #11 Michigan #14 Stephen F. Austin #7 Wisconsin #1 North Carolina | W 70–63; W 76–75; W 61–56; L 74–88 |
| 2017 | #5 | First Round; Second Round | #12 Princeton #4 West Virginia | W 60–58; L 71–83 |
| 2022 | #11 | First Four; First Round; Second Round | #11 Rutgers #6 Alabama #3 Texas Tech | W 89–87 ^{2OT} W 78–64; L 53–59 |

From 2011 to 2015 the round of 64 was known as the Second Round, Round of 32 was Third Round

==== NCAA tournament seeding history ====
The NCAA began seeding the tournament with the 1979 edition.

| Years → | '79 | '80 | '81 | '85 | '86 | '87 | '88 | '89 | '90 | '01 | '02 | '03 | '07 | '08 | '10 | '11 | '12 | '13 | '15 | '16 | '17 | '22 |
|---|---|---|---|---|---|---|---|---|---|---|---|---|---|---|---|---|---|---|---|---|---|---|
| Seeds → | 1 | 4 | 2 | 7 | 3 | 5 | 10 | 9 | 10 | 6 | 8 | 5 | 6 | 5 | 6 | 2 | 7 | 7 | 3 | 6 | 5 | 11 |

Best Single-Game Scoring Performances

| Rank | Player | Year | Opponent | Points |
|---|---|---|---|---|
| 1. | Austin Carr | 1970 | Ohio | 61 |
| T-4. | Austin Carr | 1970 | Kentucky | 52 |
| T-4. | Austin Carr | 1971 | TCU | 52 |
| 9. | Austin Carr | 1971 | Houston | 47 |
| T-11. | Austin Carr | 1970 | Iowa | 45 |

=== NIT results ===
The Fighting Irish have appeared in the National Invitation Tournament (NIT) 12 times. Their combined record is 27–12.

| Year | Round | Opponent | Result |
|---|---|---|---|
| 1968 | First Round; Quarterfinals; Semifinals; 3rd Place Game | Army; Long Island; Dayton; Saint Peter's | W 62–58; W 62–60; L 74–76; W 81–78 |
| 1973 | First Round; Quarterfinals; Semifinals; Final | USC; Louisville; North Carolina; Virginia Tech | W 69–65; W 79–71; W 78–71; L 91–92 |
| 1983 | First Round | Northwestern | L 57–71 |
| 1984 | First Round; Second Round; Quarterfinals; Semifinals; Final | Old Dominion; Boston College; Pittsburgh; Southwestern Louisiana; Michigan | W 67–62; W 66–52; W 72–64; W 65–59; L 63–83 |
| 1992 | First Round; Second Round; Quarterfinals; Semifinals; Final | Western Michigan; Kansas State; Manhattan; Utah; Virginia | W 63–56; W 64–48; W 74–58; W 58–55; L 76–81 OT |
| 1997 | First Round; Second Round; Quarterfinals | Oral Roberts; TCU; Michigan | W 74–58; W 82–72; L 66–67 |
| 2000 | First Round; Second Round; Quarterfinals; Semifinals; Final | Michigan; Xavier; BYU; Penn State; Wake Forest | W 75–65; W 76–64; W 64–52; W 73–52; L 61–71 |
| 2004 | First Round; Second Round; Quarterfinals | Purdue; Saint Louis; Oregon | W 71–59; W 77–66; L 61–65 |
| 2005 | First Round | Holy Cross | L 73–78 |
| 2006 | First Round; Second Round | Vanderbilt; Michigan | W 79–69; L 84–87 |
| 2009 | First Round; Second Round; Quarterfinals; Semifinals | UAB; New Mexico; Kentucky; Penn State | W 70–64; W 70–68; W 77–67; L 59–67 |
| 2018 | First Round; Second Round | Hampton; Penn State | W 84–63; L 63–73 |

== Traditions ==
| Tradition | Number | National Rank |
|---|---|---|
| All-time NCAA Tournament bids | 36 | 9th |
| All-time NCAA Tournament wins | 38 | T–24th |
| All-time wins | 1,866 | 8th |
| All-time winning percentage | .649 | 12th |

== Accomplishments ==
=== National Championships ===
The Irish were awarded two Helms Athletic Foundation National Championships.

- 1926–27 Helms Foundation National Champions
- 1935–36 Helms Foundation National Champions

=== Upsets of Number 1's and unbeatens ===
| Date | Opponent | Score | Streak before ND loss |
|---|---|---|---|
| February 2, 1948 | #1 Kentucky | 64–55 | 11 |
| March 1, 1948 | NYU | 64–59 | |
| March 12, 1954 | #1 Indiana (Note: Occurred in NCAA Tournament. Indiana was #2 in the AP sportswriters poll and #1 in the UPI coaches poll.) | 65–64 | 2 |
| January 23, 1971 | #1 UCLA (Note: UCLA's 88 game win streak started immediately after the 1971 loss to Notre Dame. The Irish bookended the streak, an NCAA men's basketball record.) | 89–82 | 19 |
| January 19, 1974 | #1 UCLA | 71–70 | 88 |
| March 5, 1977 | #1 San Francisco | 93–82 | 29 |
| February 26, 1978 | #1 Marquette | 65–59 | 5 |
| February 27, 1980 | #1 DePaul | 76–74 (2OT) | 26 |
| December 27, 1980 | #1 Kentucky (Note: Kentucky was #2 in the AP sportswriters poll and #1 in the UPI coaches poll.) | 67–61 | 7 |
| February 22, 1981 | #1 Virginia | 57–56 | 28 |
| February 1, 1987 | #1 North Carolina | 60–58 | 16 |
| February 8, 2005 | #4 Boston College | 68–65 | 20 |
| January 21, 2012 | #1 Syracuse | 67–58 | 20 |
| February 6, 2016 | #1 North Carolina (Note: North Carolina was #2 in the AP sportswriters poll and #1 in the USA Today coaches poll.) | 80–76 | 0 |
| November 22, 2017 | #6 Wichita State (Note: After that win, AP Poll ranked Notre Dame #5. First time in top 5 since 2010-11 season with the Big East.) | 67–66 | 4 |

The wins include several wins over the defending NCAA Tournament Champion. Both wins over UCLA were in seasons immediately following UCLA claiming the NCAA Championship with the 1971 win coming over a team that would be the eventual tournament champion. The 1954 win in the NCAA tournament over Indiana prevented IU from back-to-back national titles after claiming the 1953 NCAA Tournament Title. The 1978 win over Marquette was another instance of the Irish defeating the defending national champion. The 1948 win over Kentucky saw the Irish defeat the eventual Tournament champion who would go on to win both the 1948 and 1949 titles. The 1948 win over NYU was a victory over the eventual NIT runner-up, in a time when the prestige of the NIT tournament rivaled that of the NCAA tournament.

Also of note is that the 2005 win over Boston College and the 2012 win over Syracuse saw 20–0 teams traveling to South Bend and leaving with their first loss of the season. Boston College, in its final year as a member of the Big East, set the record for most consecutive wins by a Big East team to start a season. The 2012 Syracuse team began the game against the Irish with the goal of breaking Boston College's record. As in 2005, the Irish defeated Syracuse and cemented their place as the streak stopper.

== Coaches ==
=== Current coaching staff ===
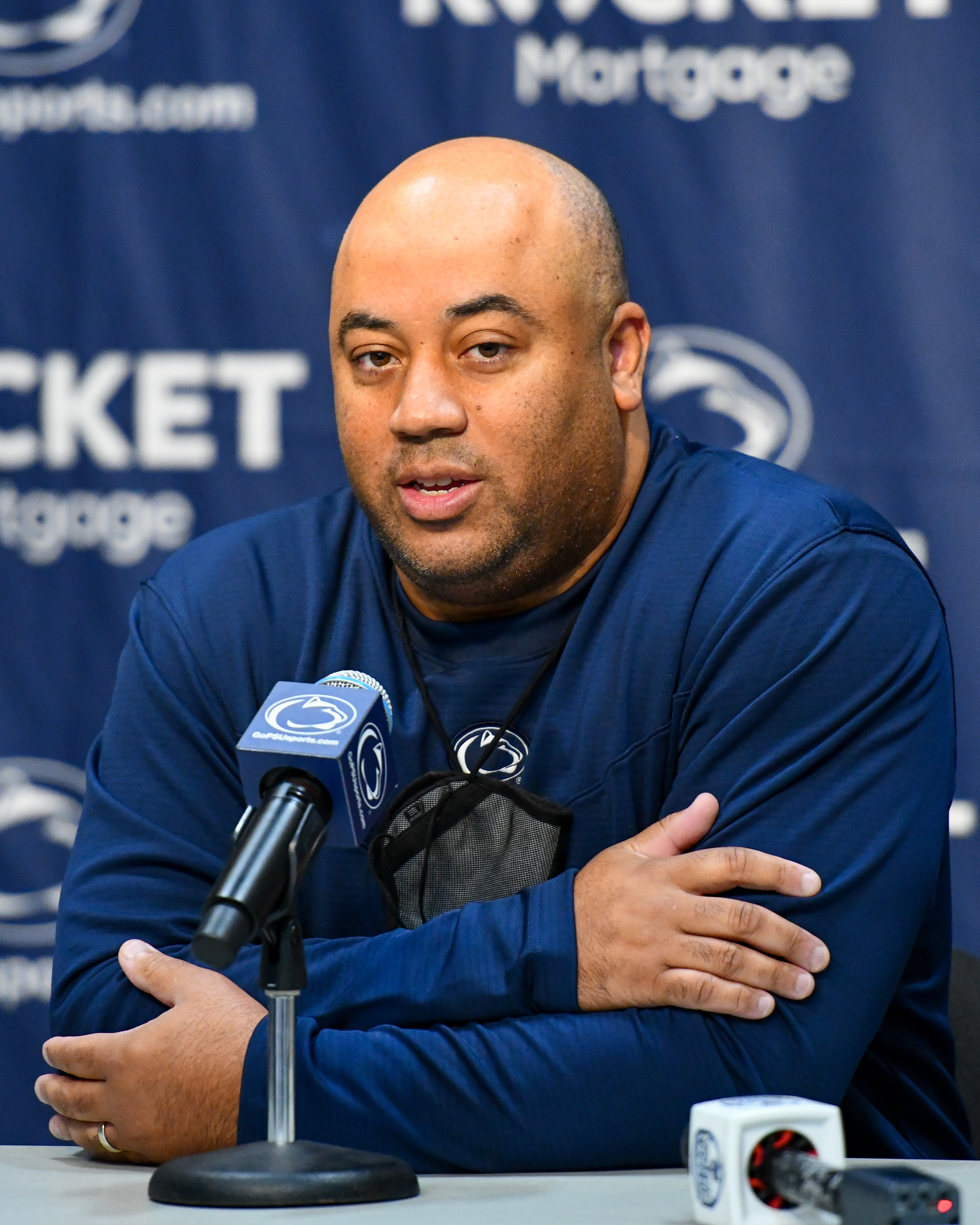
Micah Shrewsberry, the current head coach of the Fighting Irish.

- Head coach – Micah Shrewsberry
- Associate head coach – Mike Farrelly
- Assistant coach – Ryan Owens
- Assistant coach – Tre Whitted
- Assistant coach – Grady Eifert
- Assistant coach – Tony Rack
- Player development & recruiting coordinator – Isaiah Thompson
- Director of basketball operations – Colin McGettigan
- General manager – Pat Garrity

=== All-time coaching records ===
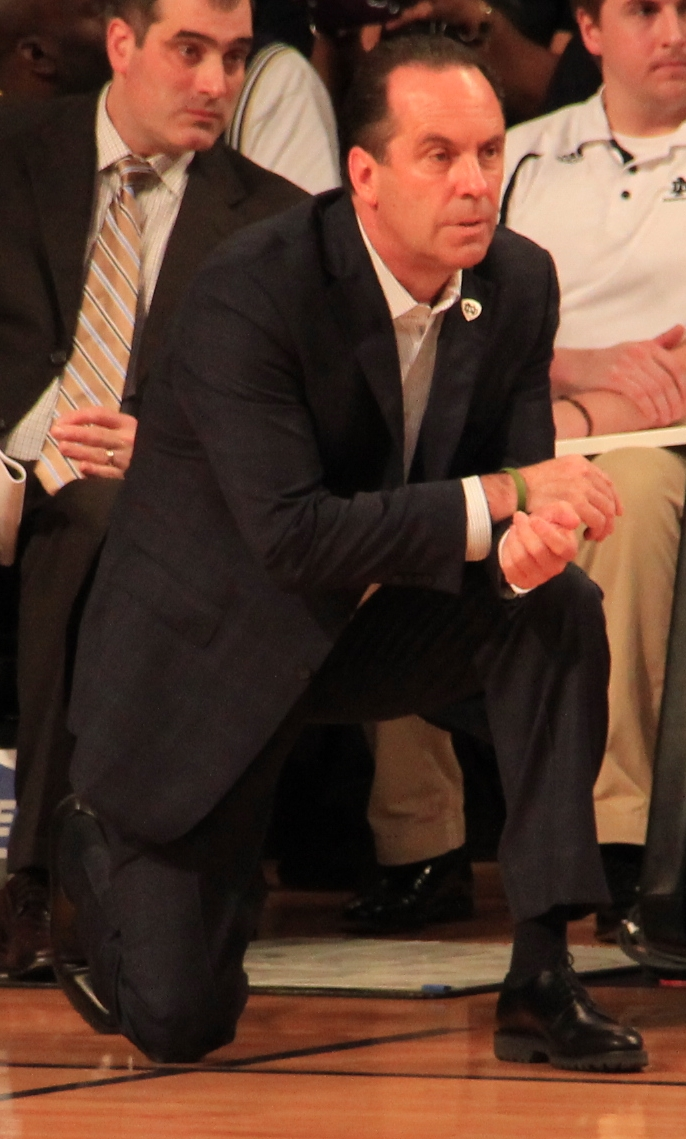
Mike Brey, the winningest head coach in Fighting Irish men's basketball history.

| Tenure | Name | Years | Record | Pct. |
|---|---|---|---|---|
| 1896–1897 | Unknown | 1 | 2–1 | .667 |
| 1897–1898 | Frank E. Hering | 1 | 1–2 | .333 |
| 1898–1899 | J. Fred Powers | 1 | 2–0 | 1.000 |
| 1907–1912 | Bertram Maris | 5 | 78–20 | .796 |
| 1912–1913 | Bill Nelson | 1 | 13–2 | .867 |
| 1913–1918 | Jesse Harper | 5 | 44–20 | .688 |
| 1918–1920 | Gus Dorais | 2 | 7–23 | .233 |
| 1920–1923 | Walter Halas | 3 | 25–39 | .391 |
| 1923–1943 | George Keogan | 20 | 327–97–1 | .771 |
| 1943–1944, 1946–1951 | Moose Krause | 6 | 98–48 | .671 |
| 1944–1945 | Clem Crowe | 1 | 15–5 | .750 |
| 1945–1946 | Elmer Ripley | 1 | 17–4 | .810 |
| 1951–1964 | John Jordan | 13 | 199–131 | .603 |
| 1964–1971 | John Dee | 7 | 116–80 | .592 |
| 1971–1991 | Digger Phelps | 20 | 393–197 | .666 |
| 1991–1999 | John MacLeod | 8 | 106–124 | .461 |
| 1999–2000 | Matt Doherty | 1 | 22–15 | .595 |
| 2000–2023 | Mike Brey | 23 | 483–280 | .633 |
| 2023–present | Micah Shrewsberry | 3 | 41–56 | .423 |
| Totals | 19 coaches | 122 seasons | 1989–1144–1 | .635 |

== Players ==
=== Current roster ===
2026–27 Notre Dame Fighting Irish men's basketball team
Players
Coaches

| Pos. | # | Name | Height | Weight | Year | Previous school | Hometown |
|---|---|---|---|---|---|---|---|
| C | 51 | Logan Duncomb | 6 ft 10 in (2.08 m) | 250 lb (113 kg) | GS | Winthrop | Cincinnati, OH |
| G/F | 23 | Ethan Roberts | 6 ft 5 in (1.96 m) | 200 lb (91 kg) | GS | Penn | Arlington Heights, IL |
| G | 3 | Braeden Smith | 6 ft 0 in (1.83 m) | 180 lb (82 kg) | GS | Gonzaga | Seattle, WA |
| F | 7 | Yoro Diallo | 6 ft 9 in (2.06 m) | 215 lb (98 kg) | GS | UVA Wise | Cincinnati, OH |
| G | 11 | Braeden Shrewsberry | 6 ft 4 in (1.93 m) | 205 lb (93 kg) | Sr | State College Area | Granger, IN |
| G | 2 | Logan Imes | 6 ft 4 in (1.93 m) | 200 lb (91 kg) | Sr | Zionsville Community | Zionsville, IN |
| G | 0 | Brady Stevens (W) | 6 ft 4 in (1.93 m) | 190 lb (86 kg) | Jr | Wellesley | Boston, MA |
| F | 4 | Bryce Ruglass Dortch | 6 ft 9 in (2.06 m) | 235 lb (107 kg) | Jr | Rutgers | Somerville, MA |
| F | 6 | Brady Koehler | 6 ft 10 in (2.08 m) | 220 lb (100 kg) | So | Cathedral | Fishers, IN |
| C | 15 | Tommy Ahneman | 6 ft 10 in (2.08 m) | 255 lb (116 kg) | So | Cretin-Derham Hall | Fargo, ND |
| F | 22 | Luke Devine (W) | 6 ft 7 in (2.01 m) | 220 lb (100 kg) | So | Campolindo | Moraga, CA |
| G | 5 | Devin Brown | 6 ft 6 in (1.98 m) | 215 lb (98 kg) | So | Davidson | Lewis Center, OH |
| G | 10 | Jonathan Sanderson | 6 ft 3 in (1.91 m) | 195 lb (88 kg) | Fr | La Lumiere | Ann Arbor, MI |
| C | 44 | Gan-Erdene Solongo | 7 ft 0 in (2.13 m) | 275 lb (125 kg) | Fr | La Lumiere | Ulaanbaatar, Mongolia |
| G | 12 | Nick Shrewsberry | 6 ft 5 in (1.96 m) | 200 lb (91 kg) | Fr | St. Joseph HS | Granger, IN |
| G | 8 | Jake Burow (W) | 6 ft 3 in (1.91 m) | 200 lb (91 kg) | Fr | Lake Country Lutheran | Slinger, WI |

Head coach

- Micah Shrewsberry (Hanover)

Assistant coach(es)

- Mike Farrelly (Saint Joseph's)
- Ryan Owens (Southern Indiana)
- Tre Whitted (Marshall)
- Grady Eifert (Purdue)
- Tony Rack (Northern Kentucky)

Legend

- (C) Team captain
- (S) Suspended
- (I) Ineligible
- (W) Walk-on
- Injured
- Current redshirt

Roster
Last update: 2026-05-20

- Roster is subject to change as/if players transfer or leave the program for other reasons.

== ACC and Big East Awards ==
=== Conference Coach of the Year ===
| Year | Coach | Conference |
|---|---|---|
| 2011 | Mike Brey | Big East |
| 2008 | Mike Brey | Big East |
| 2007 | Mike Brey | Big East |
| 1997 | John MacLeod | Big East |

=== Conference Player of the Year ===
| Year | Player | Conference |
|---|---|---|
| 2011 | Ben Hansbrough | Big East |
| 2008 | Luke Harangody | Big East |
| 2001 | Troy Murphy | Big East |
| 2000 | Troy Murphy | Big East |
| 1997 | Pat Garrity | Big East |

=== Conference Rookie of the Year ===
| Year | Player | Conference |
|---|---|---|
| 2024 | Markus Burton | ACC |
| 2002 | Chris Thomas | Big East |
| 1999 | Troy Murphy | Big East |

=== Conference Most Improved Player ===
| Year | Player | Conference |
|---|---|---|
| 2012 | Jack Cooley | Big East |

=== ACC Tournament MVP ===
| Year | Player |
|---|---|
| 2015 | Jerian Grant |

=== Conference All-Tournament First Team ===
| Year | Player | Conference |
|---|---|---|
| 2017 | Bonzie Colson | ACC |
| 2017 | Matt Farrell | ACC |
| 2015 | Pat Connaughton | ACC |
| 2015 | Jerian Grant | ACC |
| 2015 | Steve Vasturia | ACC |
| 2013 | Pat Connaughton | Big East |
| 2011 | Scott Martin | Big East |
| 2010 | Tory Jackson | Big East |
| 2007 | Russell Carter | Big East |
| 2002 | Chris Thomas | Big East |

=== ACC All-Tournament Second Team ===
| Year | Player |
|---|---|
| 2018 | Bonzie Colson |
| 2017 | Steve Vasturia |
| 2016 | Zach Auguste |
| 2015 | Demetrius Jackson |

=== All-Conference First Team ===
See: List of All-ACC teams and List of All-Big East teams

| Year | Player | Conference |
|---|---|---|
| 2020 | John Mooney | ACC |
| 2017 | Bonzie Colson | ACC |
| 2015 | Jerian Grant | ACC |
| 2013 | Jack Cooley | Big East |
| 2011 | Ben Hansbrough | Big East |
| 2010 | Luke Harangody | Big East |
| 2009 | Luke Harangody | Big East |
| 2008 | Luke Harangody | Big East |
| 2008 | Kyle McAlarney | Big East |
| 2007 | Russell Carter | Big East |
More: Year / Player / Conference; 2007 / Colin Falls / Big East; 2006 / Chris Quinn / Big East; 2003 / Matt Carroll / Big East; 2002 / Ryan Humphrey / Big East; 2001 / Troy Murphy / Big East; 2000 / Troy Murphy / Big East; 1998 / Pat Garrity / Big East; 1997 / Pat Garrity / Big East

=== All-Conference Second Team ===
| Year | Player | Conference |
|---|---|---|
| 2025 | Markus Burton | ACC |
| 2022 | Blake Wesley | ACC |
| 2016 | Demetrius Jackson | ACC |
| 2013 | Jerian Grant | Big East |
| 2012 | Jack Cooley | Big East |
| 2004 | Chris Thomas | Big East |
| 2003 | Chris Thomas | Big East |
| 1999 | Troy Murphy | Big East |

=== All-Conference Third Team ===
| Year | Player | Conference |
|---|---|---|
| 2024 | Markus Burton | ACC |
| 2022 | Dane Goodwin | ACC |
| 2021 | Prentiss Hubb | ACC |
| 2019 | John Mooney | ACC |
| 2018 | Matt Farrell | ACC |
| 2016 | Zach Auguste | ACC |
| 2015 | Pat Connaughton | ACC |
| 2011 | Tim Abromaitis | Big East |
| 2005 | Chris Thomas | Big East |
| 2002 | Chris Thomas | Big East |
More: Year / Player / Conference; 2001 / Ryan Humphrey / Big East; 1996 / Pat Garrity / Big East

=== All-Conference Honorable Mention ===
| Year | Player | Conference |
|---|---|---|
| 2022 | Paul Atkinson | ACC |
| 2021 | Nate Laszewski | ACC |
| 2017 | V. J. Beachem | ACC |
| 2017 | Matt Farrell | ACC |
| 2017 | Steve Vasturia | ACC |
| 2014 | Eric Atkins | ACC |
| 2010 | Tim Abromaitis | Big East |
| 2004 | Torin Francis | Big East |
| 2002 | David Graves | Big East |

=== Conference All-Rookie/All-Freshman Team ===
| Year | Player | Conference |
|---|---|---|
| 2024 | Markus Burton | ACC |
| 2023 | JJ Starling | ACC |
| 2022 | Blake Wesley | ACC |
| 2012 | Jerian Grant | Big East |
| 2007 | Luke Harangody | Big East |
| 2007 | Tory Jackson | Big East |
| 2003 | Torin Francis | Big East |
| 2002 | Chris Thomas | Big East |
| 1999 | Troy Murphy | Big East |

== National awards ==
=== Coaching awards ===
National Coach of the Year

- Digger Phelps (1974) (UPI), (1987) (Basketball Weekly)
- Mike Brey (2011) (AP, Henry Iba Award, CBS Sports.com, Sports Illustrated), (2012) (Jim Phelan Coach of the Year Award)

Skip Prosser Man of the Year Award

- Mike Brey (2008)

National Association of Basketball Coaches (NABC) District V Coach of the Year

- Mike Brey (2011, 2012)

=== Player awards ===
National Players of the Year

- John Moir (1936) – Helms
- Austin Carr (1971) – AP, UPI, Helms(shared)
- Adrian Dantley (1976) – U.S. Basketball Writers Association

National Freshman of the Year

- Chris Thomas (2002) – Basketball Times, Basketball News

Academic All-American First Team

- Tim Abromaitis (2010, 2011)

First Team All-American Notre Dame leads all schools with 3 of the 18 total 3-time Consensus All-American selections.

- Raymond Scanlon (1909)
- Noble Kizer (1925)
- John Nyikos (1927)
- Moose Krause (1932, 1933, 1934)
- John Moir (1936, 1937, 1938)
- Paul Nowak (1936, 1937, 1938)
- Leo Klier (1944, 1946)
- Billy Hassett (1945)
- Kevin O'Shea (1948)
- Austin Carr (1971)
- John Shumate (1974)
- Adrian Dantley (1975, 1976)
- Troy Murphy (2000, 2001)
- Jerian Grant (2015)

Second Team All-American

- Bob Rensberger (1943)
- Billy Hassett (1946)
- Kevin O'Shea (1950)
- Tom Hawkins (1959)
- Austin Carr (1970)
- Kelly Tripucka (1979, 1981)
- John Paxson (1982, 1983)
- Pat Garrity (1998)
- Luke Harangody (2008, 2009, 2010)
- Ben Hansbrough (2011)

John Wooden All-Americans

- Troy Murphy (2000, 2001)
- Luke Harangody (2008)

NIT MVP

- John Shumate (1973)

For a complete list of yearly all-Americans, see: 2007–08 Notre Dame Men's Basketball Media Guide pages 176–179 (PDF copy available at 2007–08 Men's Basketball Guide)

=== Naismith Basketball Hall of Fame ===
- George Keogan (1961)
- Elmer Ripley (1973)
- Moose Krause (1976)
- Adrian Dantley (2008)

=== Fighting Irish currently in the NBA ===
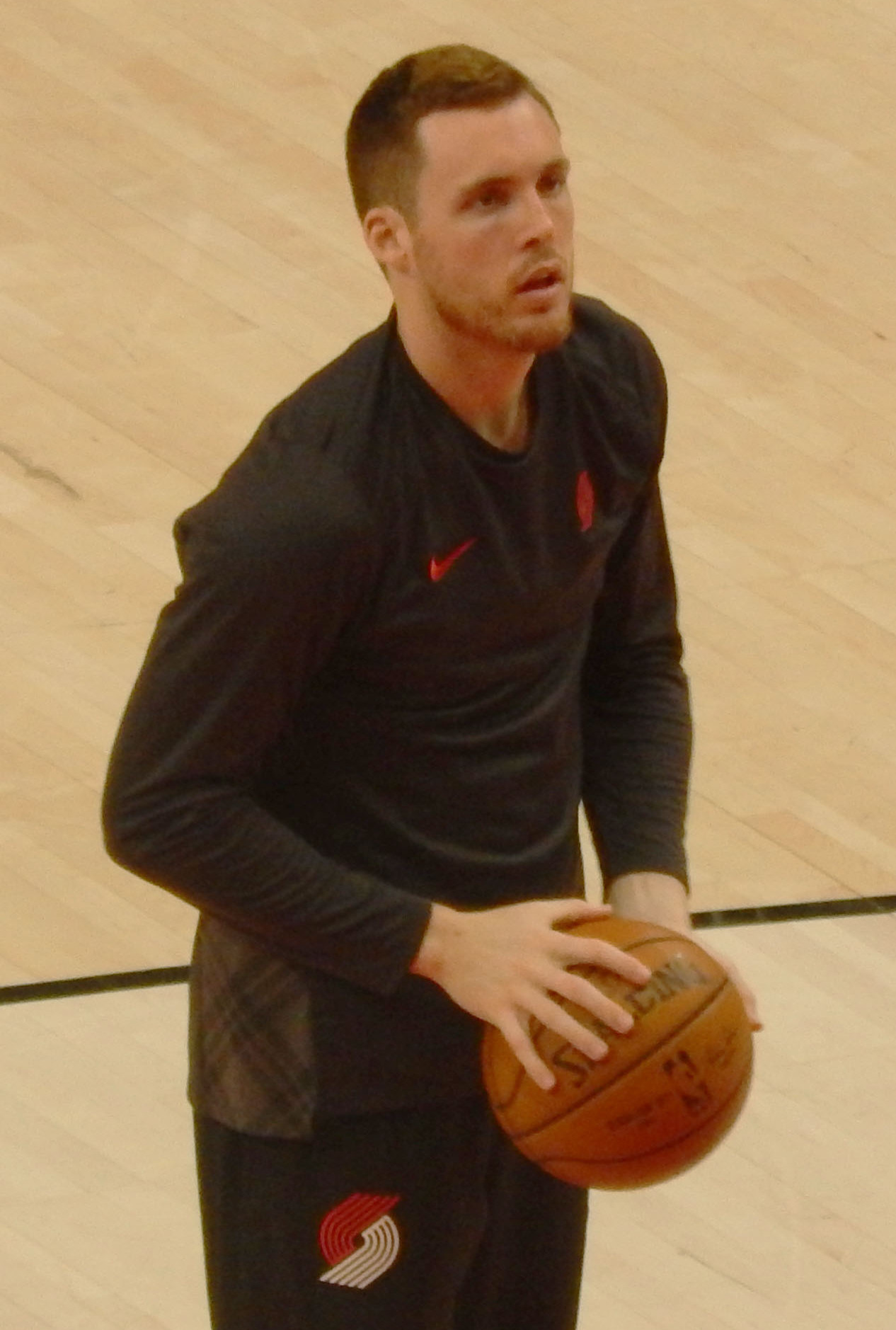
Pat Connaughton

- Pat Connaughton – Charlotte Hornets
- Cormac Ryan – Milwaukee Bucks
- Blake Wesley – Portland Trail Blazers

=== Fighting Irish currently in other leagues ===
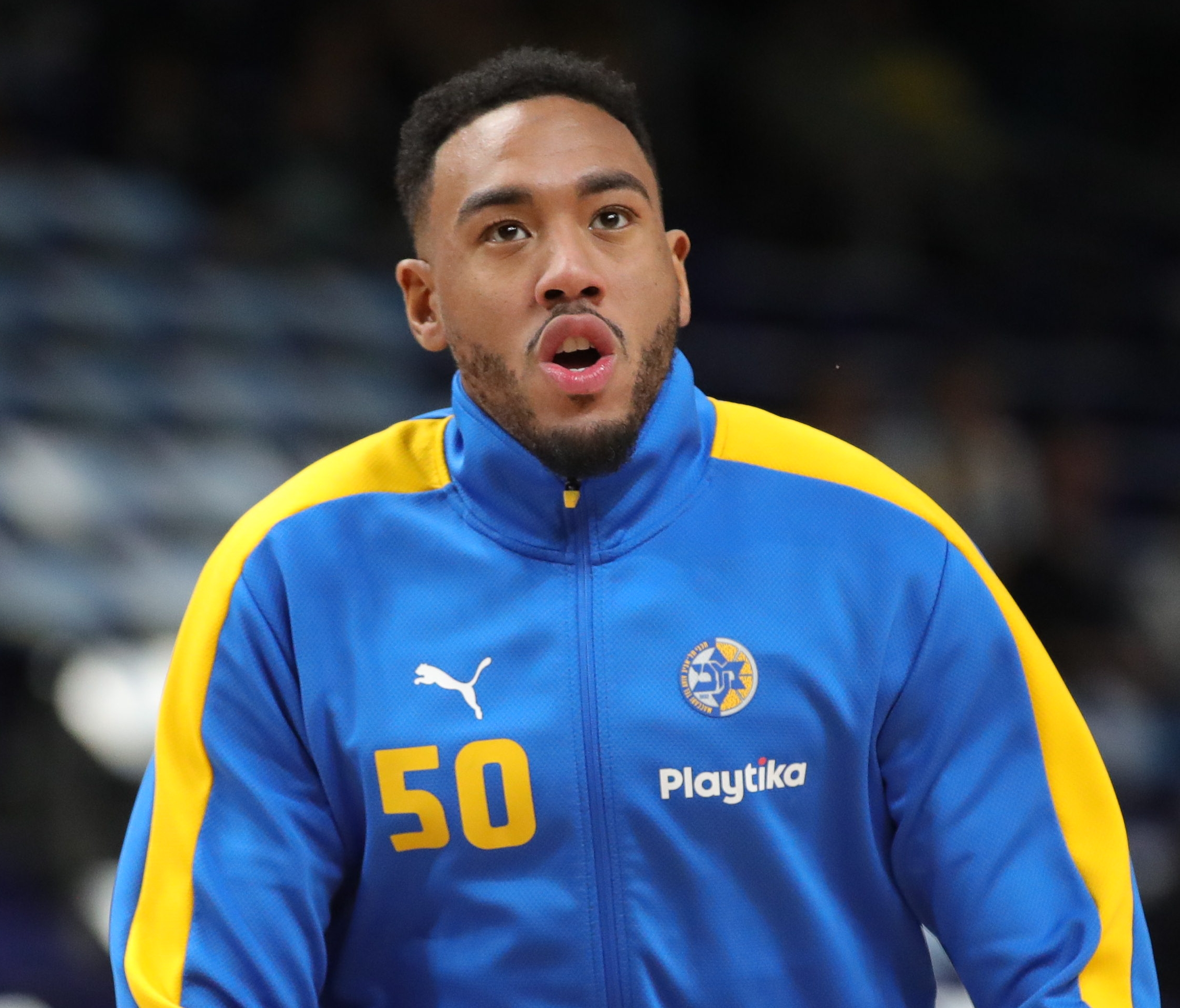
Bonzie Colson

- Tim Abromaitis – Lenovo Tenerife (Liga ACB)
- Matt Allocco – San Diego Clippers (NBA G League)
- Paul Atkinson – free agent
- Zach Auguste – SeaHorses Mikawa (B.League)
- Bonzie Colson – Maccabi Tel Aviv (Israeli Basketball Premier League and EuroLeague)
- Jack Cooley – Ryukyu Golden Kings (B.League)
- Martinas Geben – Bàsquet Girona (Liga ACB)
- Dane Goodwin – Grand Rapids Gold (NBA G League)
- Jerian Grant – Panathinaikos B.C. (Greek Basketball League and EuroLeague)
- Prentiss Hubb – Derthona Basket (Lega Basket Serie A)
- Nate Laszewski – Maccabi Ra'anana (Israeli Basketball Premier League)
- John Mooney – Chiba Jets (B.League)
- Matt Ryan – Dubai Basketball (ABA League and EuroLeague)

== See also ==
- Big East
- List of teams with the most victories in NCAA Division I men's college basketball
- Notre Dame–UCLA rivalry
