= 2007–08 Big East Conference men's basketball season =

American college basketball season

2007–08 Big East Conference Men's Basketball Season
- League: NCAA Division I
- Sport: Basketball
- Duration: November 7, 2007 through March 15, 2008
- Teams: 16
- TV partner: ESPN

Regular Season
- Champion: Georgetown (15–3)
- Season MVP: Luke Harangody – Notre Dame

Tournament
- Champions: Pittsburgh
- Finals MVP: Sam Young – Pittsburgh

Basketball seasons
- 2006–07 2008–09

2007–08 Big East men's basketball standings
	Conf.				Overall
Team	W		L	PCT	W		L	PCT
No. 8 Georgetown	15	–	3	.833	28	–	6	.824
No. 13 Louisville	14	–	4	.778	27	–	9	.750
No. 15 Notre Dame	14	–	4	.778	25	–	8	.758
No. 16 Connecticut	13	–	5	.722	24	–	9	.727
West Virginia	11	–	7	.611	26	–	11	.703
No. 25 Marquette	11	–	7	.611	25	–	10	.714
No. 17 Pittsburgh†	10	–	8	.556	27	–	10	.730
Villanova	9	–	9	.500	22	–	13	.629
Syracuse	9	–	9	.500	21	–	14	.600
Cincinnati	8	–	10	.444	13	–	19	.406
Seton Hall	7	–	11	.389	17	–	15	.531
Providence	6	–	12	.333	15	–	16	.484
*DePaul	6	–	12	.333	11	–	19	.367
*St. John's	5	–	13	.278	11	–	19	.367
*South Florida	3	–	15	.167	12	–	19	.387
*Rutgers	3	–	15	.167	11	–	20	.355
† 2008 Big East tournament winner As of April 7, 2008; Rankings from AP Poll; *Did not qualify for 2008 Big East tournament.

The 2007–08 Big East Conference men's basketball season was the 29th in conference history, and involved its 16 full-time member schools.

Georgetown was the regular-season champion with a record of 15–3. Pittsburgh won the Big East tournament championship.

== Season summary & highlights ==
- Georgetown was the regular-season champion with a record of 15–3. It was Georgetown's ninth conference championship or co-championship, fourth outright championship, and second consecutive championship.
- Pittsburgh won its second Big East tournament championship and first since 2003.
- The Big East regular-season schedule expanded from 16 to 18 games.
- The Big East introduced its Sixth Man of the Year award, presented at the end of each season to the best reserve player of the year.

== Head coaches ==
School	Coach	Season	Notes
Cincinnati	Mick Cronin	2nd	
Connecticut	Jim Calhoun	22nd	
DePaul	Jerry Wainwright	3rd	
Georgetown	John Thompson III	4th	
Louisville	Rick Pitino	5th	
Marquette	Tom Crean	6th	Resigned April 1, 2008
Notre Dame	Mike Brey	8th	Big East Coach of the Year (2nd award)
Pittsburgh	Jamie Dixon	5th	
Providence	Tim Welsh	10th	Fired March 15, 2008
Rutgers	Fred Hill	2nd	
St. John's	Norm Roberts	4th	
Seton Hall	Bobby Gonzalez	2nd	
South Florida	Stan Heath	1st	
Syracuse	Jim Boeheim	32nd	
Villanova	Jay Wright	7th	
West Virginia	Bob Huggins	1st	

== Rankings ==
Georgetown was ranked in the Associated Press poll Top 25 all season, reaching No. 5 and finishing at No. 8. Marquette spent all but one week in the Top 25 and finished at No. 25. Connecticut, Louisville, Notre Dame, and Pittsburgh also appeared in the Top 25 and finished the season as ranked teams. Syracuse, Villanova, and West Virginia also spent time in the Top 25.

2007–08 Big East Conference Weekly Rankings Key: ██ Increase in ranking. ██ Decrease in ranking.
AP Poll	Pre	11/12	11/19	11/26	12/3	12/10	12/17	12/24	12/31	1/7	1/14	1/21	1/28	2/4	2/11	2/18	2/25	3/3	3/10	Final
Cincinnati																				
Connecticut														19	17	13	15	13	15	16
DePaul																				
Georgetown	5	5	5	5	5	5	5	8	7	7	5	9	6	6	8	12	11	11	9	8
Louisville	6	6	6	12	14	22									23	18	13	12	13	13
Marquette	11	10	11	13	11	10	10	12	10	15	13	21	17	16		25	21	21	25	25
Notre Dame														22	20	21	17	19	14	15
Pittsburgh	22	19	17	14	12	11	11	6	13	20	15	13	18	21	22					17
Providence																				
Rutgers																				
St. John's																				
Seton Hall																				
South Florida																				
Syracuse			21																	
Villanova		24	20		25	23	20	18	17	19	25	18								
West Virginia							24	23												

== Regular-season statistical leaders ==
Scoring
Name	School	PPG
Luke Harangody	ND	20.4
Brian Laing	SHU	18.6
Sam Young	Pitt	18.1
Donté Greene	Syr	17.7
Draelon Burns	DeP	17.6

Rebounding
Name	School	RPG
Kentrell Gransberry	USF	10.8
Luke Harangody	ND	10.6
Jeff Adrien	Conn	9.2
DeJuan Blair	Pitt	9.1
Mac Koshwal	DeP	8.4

Assists
Name	School	APG
Tory Jackson	ND	5.8
A. J. Price	Conn	5.8
Jonny Flynn	Syr	5.3
Eugene Harvey	SHU	4.9
Geoff McDermott	Prov	4.9

Steals
Name	School	SPG
Jeff Xavier	Prov	2.3
Jerel McNeal	Mar	2.2
Eugene Harvey	SHU	1.9
Corey Chandler	RU	1.8
Dominic James	Mar	1.8

Blocks
Name	School	BPG
Hasheem Thabeet	Conn	4.5
Hamady N'Diaye	RU	3.0
Roy Hibbert	GU	2.2
Earl Clark	Lou	1.7
Donté Greene	Syr	1.6

Field Goals
Name	School	FG%
Arinze Onuaku	Syr	.628
Roy Hibbert	GU	.609
Kentrell Gransberry	USF	.518
Sam Young	Pitt	.503
Jeff Adrien	Conn	.501

3-Pt Field Goals
Name	School	3FG%
Kyle McAlarney	ND	.441
Alex Ruoff	WVU	.410
Deonta Vaughn	Cin	.398
Donté Greene	Syr	.345
(no other qualifiers)

Free Throws
Name	School	FT%
Rob Kurz	ND	.853
Joe Alexander	WVU	.814
Draelon Burns	DeP	.810
Brian Laing	SHU	.803
Wesley Matthews	Mar	.790

== Postseason ==
=== Big East tournament ===
==== Seeding ====
Teams were seeded in the Big East tournament based on conference record and tiebreakers. The No. 5 through No. 12 seeds played in the first round, and the No. 1 through No. 4 seeds received byes into the quarterfinal round. Teams which finished below 12th place in the conference after the application as necessary of tiebreakers did not qualify for the tournament

Seeding was (1) Georgetown, (2) Louisville, (3) Notre Dame, (4) Connecticut, (5) West Virginia, (6) Marquette, (7) Pittsburgh, (8) Villanova, (9) Syracuse, (10) Cincinnati, (11) Seton Hall, and (12) Providence. By finishing below 12th place, DePaul, Rutgers, St. John's, and South Florida did not qualify for the tournament.

==== Bracket ====
First round March 12, 2008
8	Villanova	82
9	Syracuse	63
5	West Virginia	58
12	Providence	53
6	#25 Marquette	67
11	Seton Hall	54
7	Pittsburgh	70
10	Cincinnati	64

Quarterfinals; March 13, 2008
1	#9 Georgetown	82
8	Villanova	63
4	#15 Connecticut	72
5	West Virginia	78
3	#14 Notre Dame	79
6	#25 Marquette	89
2	#13 Louisville	69
7	Pittsburgh	76^{OT}

Semifinals; March 14, 2008
1	#9 Georgetown	72
5	West Virginia	55
6	#25 Marquette	61
7	Pittsburgh	68

Championship Game; March 15, 2008
1	#9 Georgetown	65
7	Pittsburgh	74

=== NCAA tournament ===
Eight Big East teams received bids to the NCAA Tournament. Connecticut lost in the first round and Georgetown, Marquette, Notre Dame, and Pittsburgh in the second round. Villanova and West Virginia were defeated in the regional semifinals and Louisville in the regional finals.

School	Region	Seed	Round 1	Round 2	Sweet 16	Elite 8
Louisville	East	3	14 Boise State, W 79–61	6 Oklahoma, W 78–48	2 Tennessee, W 79–60	1 North Carolina, L 83–73
West Virginia	West	7	10 Arizona, W 75–65	2 Duke, W 73–67	3 Xavier, L 79–75^{(OT)}	
Villanova	Midwest	12	5 Clemson, W 75–69	13 Siena, W 84–72	1 Kansas, L 72–57	
Georgetown	Midwest	2	15 UMBC, W 66–47	10 Davidson, L 74–70		
Pittsburgh	South	4	13 Oral Roberts, W 82–63	5 Michigan State, L 65–54		
Notre Dame	East	5	12 George Mason, W 68–50	4 Washington State, L 61–41		
Marquette	South	6	11 Kentucky, W 74–66	3 Stanford, L 82–81^{(OT)}		
Connecticut	West	4	13 San Diego, L 70–69^{(OT)}			

=== National Invitation Tournament ===
Syracuse received a bid to the National Invitation Tournament. Seeded No. 1 in the in one of the tournament's unnamed brackets, the Orange lost in the quarterfinals.

School	Seed	Round 1	Round 2	Quarterfinals
Syracuse	1	8 Robert Morris, W 87–81	5 Maryland, W 88–72	2 UMass, L 81–77

=== College Basketball Invitational ===
Cincinnati accepted a bid to the inaugural College Basketball Invitational. The Bearcats lost in the first round.

School	Region	Seed	Round 1
Cincinnati	Midwest	4	1 Bradley, L 70–67

== Awards and honors ==
=== Big East Conference ===
Player of the Year:

- Hasheem Thabeet, Connecticut, C, So.

Defensive Player of the Year:

- Jerel McNeal, Marquette, G, So.

Co-Rookies of the Year:

- DeJuan Blair, Pittsburgh, F, Fr.
- Jonny Flynn, Syracuse, G. Fr.

Sixth Man of the Year:

- Patrick Ewing Jr., Georgetown, F, Sr.

Most Improved Player:

- Sam Young, Pittsburgh, F, Jr.

Coach of the Year:

- Mike Brey, Notre Dame (8th season)

All-Big East First Team

- A. J. Price, Connecticut, G, Jr., 6 ft 2 in (188 cm), 181 lb (82 kg), Amityville, N.Y.
- Joe Alexander, West Virginia, G, Jr., 6 ft 8 in (203 cm), 230 lb (104 kg), Mount Airy, Md.
- Kentrell Gransberry, South Florida, C, Sr., 6 ft 9 in (206 cm), 270 lb (122 kg), Baton Rouge, La.
- Brian Laing, Seton Hall, G, Jr., 6 ft 5 in (196 cm), 216 lb (98 kg), The Bronx, N.Y.
- Sam Young, Pittsburgh, F, Jr., 6 ft 6 in (198 cm), 220 lb (100 kg), Clinton, Md.
- Luke Harangody, Notre Dame, F, So., 6 ft 8 in (203 cm), 246 lb (112 kg), Schererville, Ind.
- Kyle McAlarney, Notre Dame, G, Jr., 6 ft 1 in (185 cm), 195 lb (88 kg), Staten Island, N.Y.
- David Padgett, Louisville, C, Sr., 6 ft 11 in (211 cm), 250 lb (113 kg), Reno, Nev.
- Roy Hibbert, Georgetown, C, Sr., 7 ft 2 in (218 cm), 278 lb (126 kg), Adelphi, Md.
- Jeff Adrien, Connecticut, F, Jr., 6 ft 7 in (201 cm), 243 lb (110 kg), Brookline, Mass.
- Deonta Vaughn, Cincinnati, G, So., 6 ft 1 in (185 cm), 190 lb (86 kg), Indianapolis, Ind.

All-Big East Second Team:

- Terrence Williams, Louisville, F, Jr., 6 ft 6 in (198 cm), 220 lb (100 kg), Seattle, Wash.
- Dominic James, Marquette, G, So., 5 ft 11 in (180 cm), 185 lb (84 kg), Richmond, Ind.
- Jerel McNeal, Marquette, G, Jr., 6 ft 3 in (191 cm), 200 lb (91 kg), Chicago, Ill.
- Lazar Hayward, Marquette, F, So., 6 ft 6 in (198 cm), 225 lb (102 kg), Buffalo, N.Y.
- Jonathan Wallace, Georgetown, G, Sr., 6 ft 1 in (185 cm), 195 lb (88 kg), Harvest, Ala.
- Draelon Burns, DePaul, G, Sr., 6 ft 4 in (193 cm), 210 lb (95 kg), Milwaukee, Wis.
- Hasheem Thabeet, Connecticut, C, So., 7 ft 3 in (221 cm), 263 lb (119 kg), Dar es Salaam, Tanzania
- Donté Greene, Connecticut, C, Fr., 6 ft 11 in (211 cm), 226 lb (103 kg), Baltimore, Md.
- Paul Harris, Syracuse, F, So., 6 ft 5 in (196 cm), 230 lb (104 kg), Niagara Falls, N.Y.
- Scottie Reynolds, Villanova, G, So., 6 ft 2 in (188 cm), 195 lb (88 kg), Herndon, Va.

Big East All-Rookie Team:

- Dar Tucker, DePaul, G, Fr., 6 ft 5 in (196 cm), 215 lb (98 kg), Saginaw, Mich.
- Mac Koshwal, DePaul, C, Fr., 6 ft 10 in (208 cm), 225 lb (102 kg), Chicago, Ill.
- Austin Freeman, Georgetown, G, Fr., 6 ft 4 in (193 cm), 235 lb (107 kg), Mitchellville, Md.
- DeJuan Blair, Pittsburgh, F, Fr., 6 ft 7 in (201 cm), 265 lb (120 kg), Pittsburgh, Pa.
- Corey Chandler, Rutgers, G, Fr., 6 ft 2 in (188 cm), 198 lb (90 kg), Newark, N.J.
- Jeremy Hazell, Seton Hall, G, Fr., 6 ft 5 in (196 cm), 188 lb (85 kg), Harlem, N.Y.
- Dominique Jones, South Florida, G, Fr., 6 ft 4 in (193 cm), 205 lb (93 kg), Lake Wales, Fla.
- Justin Burrell, St. John's, G, Fr., 6 ft 8 in (203 cm), 244 lb (111 kg), The Bronx, N.Y.
- Donté Greene, Connecticut, C, Fr., 6 ft 11 in (211 cm), 226 lb (103 kg), Baltimore, Md.
- Jonny Flynn, St. John's, G, Fr., 6 ft 0 in (183 cm), 185 lb (84 kg), Niagara Falls, N.Y.
- Corey Fisher, Villanova, G, Fr., 6 ft 1 in (185 cm), 200 lb (91 kg), The Bronx, N.Y.

=== All-Americans ===
The following players were selected to the 2008 Associated Press All-America teams.

Consensus All-America Second Team:

- Roy Hibbert, Georgetown, Key Stats: 13.4 ppg, 6.4 rpg, 1.9 apg, 2.2 bpg, 60.9 FG%, 454 points

Second Team All-America:

- Luke Harangody, Notre Dame, Key Stats: 20.4 ppg, 10.6 rpg, 1.7 apg, 50.0 FG%, 33.3 3P%, 672 points
- Roy Hibbert, Georgetown, Key Stats: 13.4 ppg, 6.4 rpg, 1.9 apg, 2.2 bpg, 60.9 FG%, 454 points

AP Honorable Mention

- Joe Alexander, West Virginia
- A. J. Price, Connecticut
- Sam Young, Pittsburgh

== See also ==
- 2007–08 NCAA Division I men's basketball season
- 2007–08 Cincinnati Bearcats men's basketball team
- 2007–08 Connecticut Huskies men's basketball team
- 2007–08 Georgetown Hoyas men's basketball team
- 2007–08 Louisville Cardinals men's basketball team
- 2007–08 Marquette Golden Eagles men's basketball team
- 2007–08 Notre Dame Fighting Irish men's basketball team
- 2007–08 Pittsburgh Panthers men's basketball team
- 2007–08 Providence Friars men's basketball team
- 2007–08 St. John's Red Storm men's basketball team
- 2007–08 Syracuse Orange men's basketball team
- 2007–08 Villanova Wildcats men's basketball team
- 2007–08 West Virginia Mountaineers men's basketball team
