= 2008–09 Big East Conference men's basketball season =

American college basketball season

2008–09 Big East Conference Men's Basketball Season
- League: NCAA Division I
- Sport: Basketball
- Duration: November 14, 2008 through March 7, 2009
- Teams: 16
- TV partner(s): Big East Network, ESPN

Regular Season
- Champion: Louisville (16–2)
- Runners-up: Connecticut, Pittsburgh (15–3)
- Season MVP: Hasheem Thabeet – Connecticut; DeJuan Blair – Pittsburgh

Tournament
- Champions: Louisville
- Finals MVP: Jonny Flynn – Syracuse

Basketball seasons
- 2007–08 2009–10

2008–09 Big East men's basketball standings
	Conf.				Overall
Team	W		L	PCT	W		L	PCT
No. 1 Louisville†	16	–	2	.889	31	–	6	.838
No. 4 Pittsburgh	15	–	3	.833	31	–	5	.861
No. 5 Connecticut	15	–	3	.833	31	–	5	.861
No. 11 Villanova	13	–	5	.722	30	–	8	.789
No. 23 Marquette	12	–	6	.667	25	–	10	.714
No. 13 Syracuse	11	–	7	.611	28	–	10	.737
West Virginia	10	–	8	.556	23	–	12	.657
Providence	10	–	8	.556	19	–	14	.576
Notre Dame	8	–	10	.444	21	–	15	.583
Cincinnati	8	–	10	.444	18	–	14	.563
Seton Hall	7	–	11	.389	17	–	15	.531
Georgetown	7	–	11	.389	16	–	15	.516
St. John's	6	–	12	.333	16	–	18	.471
South Florida	4	–	14	.222	9	–	22	.290
Rutgers	2	–	16	.111	11	–	21	.344
DePaul	0	–	18	.000	9	–	24	.273
† 2009 Big East tournament winner As of April 4, 2009; Rankings from AP Poll

The 2008–09 Big East Conference men's basketball season was the 30th in conference history, and involved its 16 full-time member schools. Leading up to, during, and following the season, it has been widely regarded as one of the most successful seasons in Big East Conference history, fielding multiple teams that received national recognition and achieved high levels of success.

Louisville won the outright championship with a 16-2 record (1st). They were also champions of the Big East tournament (1st).

== Regular season ==
=== Season summary & highlights ===
- Louisville won both the regular season outright and the tournament championship.
- Louisville finished the season ranked first in both AP and Coach's polls.
- Louisville received the overall #1 seed in the NCAA tournament.
- Connecticut won the 2008 Paradise Jam Tournament in the Virgin Islands.
- Pittsburgh won the 2008 Legends Classic Tournament.
- Syracuse won the 2008 College Basketball Experience (CBE) Classic tournament.
- Connecticut led the nation in blocked shots for the 8th consecutive year.
- Connecticut Head Coach, Jim Calhoun, won his 800th career game in Division I basketball, against Marquette.
- Syracuse Head Coach, Jim Boeheim, finished the season with 799 career wins (2009 tournament games included).
- Pittsburgh defeated #1 UConn twice, marking the first and second times the Panthers defeated a #1 ranked team.
- Connecticut center, Hasheem Thabeet, recorded a triple-double against Providence on January 31, 2009, with 15 points, 11 rebounds, and 10 blocked shots.
- Villanova tied a school record for regular season wins (25).
- Pittsburgh tied a school record for wins in a season (31), and set a school record for regular season conference wins (15).
- Connecticut tied a school record for best start to a season, at 24–1.
- Pittsburgh went undefeated at home.
- Connecticut, Pittsburgh, and Louisville all reached #1 in the AP poll.

=== Rankings ===
The Big East set a record when it placed seven teams in the preseason Associated Press poll. It set another record by placing eight teams in the December 1st ranking, and broke that record when the ninth team entered the AP Top 25 on January 5. Connecticut and North Carolina were the only two teams that did not vacate the top 5 in the AP poll all season.

2008–09 Big East Conference Weekly Rankings Key: ██ Increase in ranking. ██ Decrease in ranking. RV = Received Votes
AP Poll	Pre	Wk 1	Wk 2	Wk 3	Wk 4	Wk 5	Wk 6	Wk 7	Wk 8	Wk 9	Wk 10	Wk 11	Wk 12	Wk 13	Wk 14	Wk 15	Wk 16	Wk 17	Wk 18
Cincinnati																			
Connecticut	2	2	2	2	2	2	2	2	5	4	3	2	1	1	1	2	1	3	5
DePaul																			
Georgetown	22	22	21	20	19	15	12	11	9	13	12	25							
Louisville	3	3	3	11	9	9	19	18	23	20	9	7	5	5	7	6	6	5	1
Marquette	16	15	15	25	24	24	RV	RV	18	14	11	8	8	10	10	8	13	21	23
Notre Dame	9	8	8	7	12	12	8	7	13	12	19	RV	RV						
Pittsburgh	5	6	4	3	3	3	3	3	1	1	4	3	6	4	4	1	3	2	4
Providence													RV				RV		
Rutgers																			
St. John's																			
Seton Hall			RV																
South Florida																			
Syracuse	RV	RV	RV	16	13	11	17	13	11	8	8	15	20	23	24	RV	25	18	13
Villanova	23	23	20	17	15	18	18	15	18	23	20	21	17	13	12	10	11	10	11
West Virginia	RV	RV	RV			RV	RV	RV	25	RV	RV	RV	RV	RV	RV	RV	RV	RV	RV

=== Statistical leaders ===
Scoring
Name	School	PPG
Luke Harangody	ND	23.5
Jeremy Hazell	SHU	22.7
Jerel McNeal	Marq	19.8
Sam Young	Pitt	19.2
Dar Tucker	DPU	18.5

Rebounding
Name	School	RPG
DeJuan Blair	Pitt	12.3
Luke Harangody	ND	11.8
Hasheem Thabeet	Conn	10.9
Jeff Adrien	Conn	10.0
Mac Koshwal	DPU	9.6

Assists
Name	School	APG
Levance Fields	Pitt	7.5
Jonny Flynn	Syr	6.7
Terrence Williams	UL	5.0
Dominic James	Marq	5.0
Tory Jackson	ND	4.9

Steals
Name	School	SPG
Paul Gause	SHU	2.7
Terrence Williams	UL	2.3
Dominic James	Marq	2.1
Jerel McNeal	Marq	2.0
Greg Monroe	GU	1.9

Blocks
Name	School	BPG
Hasheem Thabeet	Conn	4.3
Gregory Echinique	RU	2.4
Hamady Ndiaye	RU	2.2
John Garcia	SHU	1.8
Terrence Jennings	UL	1.6

Field Goals
Name	School	FG%
Arinze Onuaku	Syr	.667
Randall Hanke	PC	.653
Hasheem Thabeet	Conn	.649
Rick Jackson	Syr	.623
John Garcia	SHU	.606

3-Pt Field Goals
Name	School	3FG%
Ashton Gibbs	Pitt	.439
Ryan Ayers	ND	.439
Preston Knowles	UL	.432
Kyle McAlarney	ND	.426
Corey Stokes	VU	.425

Free Throws
Name	School	FT%
Sharaud Curry	PC	.845
Mike Rosario	RU	.839
Wesley Matthews	Marq	.829
Lazar Hayward	Marq	.820
Scottie Reynolds	VU	.817

== Postseason ==
=== Big East tournament ===
For the first time ever, all 16 teams in the conference would have the chance to participate in the Big East tournament. Under this new format, the teams finishing 9 through 16 in the regular season standings played first round games, while teams 5 through 8 received a bye to the second round. The top 4 teams during the regular season received a bye to the quarterfinals. The five-round tournament spanned five consecutive days, from Tuesday, March 10, 2009, through Saturday, March 14, 2009. A low-seeded team could have theoretically played all five days if it won its games in the first four rounds, but this did not turn out to be the case.

1–4 Seeding:
(1) Louisville, (2) Pittsburgh, (3) Connecticut, (4) Villanova
5–8 Seeding:
(5) Marquette, (6) Syracuse, (7) West Virginia, (8) Providence
9–16 Seeding and First Round Matchups:
(16) DePaul def. (9) Cincinnati
(10) Notre Dame def. (15) Rutgers
(11) Seton Hall def. (14) South Florida
(13) St. John's def. (12) Georgetown

Second Round Matchups:
(5) Marquette def. (13) St. John's
(6) Syracuse def. (11) Seton Hall
(7) West Virginia def. (10) Notre Dame
(8) Providence def. (16) DePaul

Quarterfinals Matchups:
(1) Louisville def. (8) Providence
(7) West Virginia def. (2) Pittsburgh
(6) Syracuse def. (3) Connecticut (6 OT)
(4) Villanova def. (5) Marquette

Semifinals Matchups:
(1) Louisville def. (4) Villanova
(6) Syracuse def. (7) West Virginia (OT)

Championship Game:
(1) Louisville def. (6) Syracuse, 76–66

The most notable game of the tournament was the third round matchup between Connecticut and Syracuse. A back-and-forth thriller between two rivals, this game lasted nearly four hours and finally ended after six overtimes, at 1:22 a.m. the following day. The game was tied at 71–71 with a second left in regulation, when Syracuse inbounded a pass the full length of the court. Guard, Eric Devendorf, sunk a 3-point shot as the clock appeared to run out, seemingly giving Syracuse the game. After a thorough review by officials using frame-by-frame slow motion, it became apparent that the ball was not completely off of Devendorf's fingertips as the clock changed from 0.1 to 0.0 seconds. The game headed to overtime. During overtime, UConn took a lead and maintained it, until Syracuse finally tied the score to force another overtime. This pattern continued for five overtimes, where in each one, UConn took and maintained a lead, only to have Syracuse tie the score before time ran out. In the sixth and final overtime, Syracuse came out and took a large lead (their first since regulation) that eventually proved insurmountable for UConn, and won the game, 127–117. The game produced a few records when it came to duration, including longest Big East game in history. A.J. Price of Connecticut, and Jonny Flynn and Eric Devendorf of Syracuse, each played over 60 minutes, with another three Connecticut players and one Syracuse player playing over 50 minutes. Between the two teams, nine players had double-figure point totals, and five UConn players had double-figure rebound totals. With over 100 points scored in the overtime periods alone, this game was dubbed an "Instant Classic" and was given the title "The Game That Wouldn't End."

In the following round, Syracuse again found itself in overtime, this time against West Virginia. Syracuse came out the winner, but would lose the following night to Louisville. This was Louisville's first Big East tournament championship. Jonny Flynn was named the tournament's Most Outstanding Player, becoming only the 4th player in the 30 year history of the tournament to win the award while playing on the losing team.

=== NCAA tournament ===
The Big East posted a very strong showing in the NCAA tournament. Though Notre Dame, Georgetown, and Providence were unable to secure at-large bids, seven conference teams were selected. The Big Ten and the Atlantic Coast Conference also sent seven teams each, which was one short of the record of eight that the Big East sent in 2006 and 2008. The conference set a record by earning three #1 seeds among the four available. Connecticut, Louisville, and Pittsburgh were all the top seeds in their regions, with North Carolina being the fourth. The conference set another record by having five teams make it to the Sweet-16, and then an additional record by having four teams make it to the Elite Eight. Connecticut and Villanova each advanced to the Final Four. This was Villanova's fourth Final Four appearance (though one was vacated for violations) and first since 1985. This was UConn's third Final Four appearance, with all coming since 1999, and all happening to come from the West region. The conference finished with a combined record of 17–7.

Seed	Region	School	First Round	Second Round	Sweet 16	Elite Eight	Final Four	Championship
1	West	Connecticut	#16 Chattanooga, W, 103–47	#9 Texas A&M, W, 92–66	#5 Purdue, W, 72–60	#3 Missouri, W, 82–75	#2 Michigan State, L, 73–82	
3	East	Villanova	#14 American, W, 80–67	#6 UCLA, W, 89–69	#2 Duke, W, 77–54	#1 Pittsburgh, W, 78–76	#1 North Carolina, L, 69–83	
1	East	Pittsburgh	#16 East Tennessee State, W, 72–62	#8 Oklahoma State, W, 84–76	#4 Xavier, W, 60–55	#3 Villanova, L, 76–78		
1	MIdwest	Louisville	#16 Morehead State, W, 74–54	#8 Siena, W, 79–72	#12 Arizona, W, 103–64	#2 Michigan State, L, 52–64		
3	South	Syracuse	#14 Stephen F. Austin, W, 59–44	#6 Arizona State, W, 78–67	#2 Oklahoma, L, 71–84			
6	West	Marquette	#11 Utah State, W, 58–57	#3 Missouri, L, 79–83				
6	Midwest	West Virginia	#11 Dayton, L, 60–68					
	7 Bids	W-L (%):	6–1 (.857)	5–1 (.833)	4–1 (.800)	2–2 (.500)	0–2 (.000)	TOTAL: 17–7 (.708)

=== National Invitation Tournament ===
In the 72nd annual National Invitation Tournament, there were three Big East teams among the field of 32: Georgetown, Notre Dame, and Providence.

- Notre Dame received a 2-seed in its region. They won their first round game against 7-seed UAB, 70–64. They beat 3-seed New Mexico in the second round, 70–68. They beat Kentucky in the quarterfinals, 77–67, and lost to 2-seed Penn State in the semifinals, 67–59.
- Providence received a 5-seed in a different region. They lost their first round game to 4-seed Miami (FL), 78–66.
- Georgetown received a 6-seed in a third region. They lost their first round game to 3-seed Baylor, 74–72.

=== College Basketball Invitational ===
In the 16-team College Basketball Invitational, the lone Big East representative was St. John's. The team earned a 4-seed in the East region, and lost their opening round game to top-seeded Richmond 75–69.

== Awards and honors ==
The following players were honored with postseason awards after having been voted for by Big East Conference coaches.

Co-Players of the Year:

- Hasheem Thabeet, Connecticut, C, Jr.
- DeJuan Blair, Pittsburgh, C, So.

Defensive Player of the Year:

- Hasheem Thabeet, Connecticut, C, Jr.

Rookie of the Year:

- Greg Monroe, Georgetown, C, Fr.

Most Improved Player:

- Dante Cunningham, Villanova, F, Sr.

Sixth Man Award:

- Corey Fisher, Villanova, G, So.

Sportsmanship Award:

- Alex Ruoff, West Virginia, G, Sr.

Scholar-Athlete of the Year:

- Alex Ruoff, West Virginia, G, Sr.

Coach of the Year:

- Jay Wright, Villanova (8th season)

All-Big East First Team:

- Hasheem Thabeet, Connecticut, C, Jr., 7–3, 263, Dar es Salaam, Tanzania
- Terrence Williams, Louisville, F, Sr., 6–6, 210, Seattle, Wash.
- Jerel McNeal, Marquette, G, Sr., 6–3, 200 Chicago, Ill.
- Luke Harangody, Notre Dame, F, Jr., 6–8, 251, Schererville, Ind.
- DeJuan Blair, Pittsburgh, C, So., 6–7, 265, Pittsburgh, Pa.
- Sam Young, Pittsburgh, F, Sr., 6–6, 215, Clinton, Md.

All-Big East Second Team:

- A.J. Price, Connecticut, G, Sr., 6–2, 181, Amityville, N.Y.
- Wesley Matthews, Marquette, G, Sr., 6–5, 215, Madison, Wis.
- Jonny Flynn, Syracuse, G, So., 6–0, 185, Niagara Falls, N.Y.
- Dante Cunningham, Villanova, F, Sr., 6–8, 230, Silver Spring, Md.
- Da’Sean Butler, West Virginia, F, Jr., 6–7, 225, Newark, N.J.

All-Big East Third Team:

- Deonta Vaughn, Cincinnati, G, Jr., 6–1, 195, Indianapolis, Ind.
- Jeff Adrien, Connecticut, F, Sr., 6–7, 243, Brookline, Mass.
- Earl Clark, Louisville, G/F, Jr., 6–8, 220, Rahway, N.J.
- Levance Fields, Pittsburgh, G, Sr., 5–10, 190, Brooklyn, N.Y.
- Jeremy Hazell, Seton Hall, G, So., 6–5, 185, Bronx, N.Y.

Big East Honorable Mention:

- Weyinmi Efejuku, Providence, G, Sr., 6–5, 210, Fresh Meadows, N.Y.
- Dominique Jones, USF, G, So., 6–4, 205, Lake Wales, Fla.
- Scottie Reynolds, Villanova, G, Jr., 6–2, 195, Herndon, Va.
- Alex Ruoff, West Virginia, G, Sr., 6–6, 220, Spring Hill, Fla.

Big East All-Rookie Team:

- Yancy Gates, Cincinnati, F, Fr., 6–9, 255, Cincinnati, Ohio
- Kemba Walker, Connecticut, G, Fr., 6–0, 175, Bronx, N.Y.
- Greg Monroe, Georgetown, C, Fr., 6–10, 240, Gretna, La.
- Samardo Samuels, Louisville, F, Fr., 6–8, 240, Trelawny Parish, Jamaica
- Mike Rosario, Rutgers, G, Fr., 6–3, 180, Jersey City, N.J.
- Devin Ebanks, West Virginia, F, Fr., 6–9, 205, Long Island City, N.Y.

The following players were selected to the 2009 Associated Press All-America teams.

First Team All-America:

- DeJuan Blair, Pittsburgh, Key Stats: 15.6 ppg, 12.2 rpg, 59.9 FG%, 1.5 steals (49 1st place votes, 294 points)

Second Team All-America:

- Hasheem Thabeet, Connecticut, Key Stats: 13.7 ppg, 10.9 rpg, 4.6 blocks, 64.3 FG% (19, 238)
- Luke Harangody, Notre Dame, Key Stats: 23.2 ppg, 12.0 rpg, 2.1 apg (6, 135)
- Jerel McNeal, Marquette, Key Stats: 19.3 ppg, 4.5 rpg, 3.8 apg, 40.6 3-pt FG% (7, 114)

Third Team All-America:

- Terrence Williams, Louisville, Key Stats: 12.3 ppg, 8.5 rpg, 5.1 apg, 2.5 steals (4, 103)
- Sam Young, Pittsburgh, Key Stats: 18.7 ppg, 6.1 rpg (1, 79)

== See also ==
- 2008–09 NCAA Division I men's basketball season
- 2008–09 Connecticut Huskies men's basketball team
- 2008–09 Georgetown Hoyas men's basketball team
- 2008–09 Louisville Cardinals men's basketball team
- 2008–09 Marquette Golden Eagles men's basketball team
- 2008–09 Notre Dame Fighting Irish men's basketball team
- 2008–09 Pittsburgh Panthers men's basketball team
- 2008–09 Providence Friars men's basketball team
- 2008–09 Syracuse Orange men's basketball team
- 2008–09 Villanova Wildcats men's basketball team
- 2008–09 West Virginia Mountaineers men's basketball team
