= 2010 NBA draft =

Basketball player selection

General information
- Sport: Basketball
- Date: June 24, 2010
- Location: The Theater at Madison Square Garden (New York City)
- Network: ESPN

Overview
- 60 total selections in 2 rounds
- League: NBA
- First selection: John Wall (Washington Wizards)

The 2010 NBA draft was held on June 24, 2010, at The Theater at Madison Square Garden in New York City. The draft, which started at 7:00 pm Eastern Daylight Time (2300 UTC), was broadcast in the United States on ESPN. In this draft, National Basketball Association (NBA) teams took turns selecting amateur U.S. college basketball players and other eligible players, including international players. This draft set a record with five players being drafted from the same school in the first round. The players were John Wall (first), DeMarcus Cousins (fifth), Patrick Patterson (fourteenth), Eric Bledsoe (eighteenth), and Daniel Orton (twenty-ninth), all from the University of Kentucky. This draft also marked the second time an NBA D-League player was drafted, with the first case coming in 2008.

The Washington Wizards, who won the draft lottery on May 18, 2010, used their first overall draft pick to draft John Wall from the University of Kentucky. The Philadelphia 76ers, who also beat the odds in the draft lottery to obtain the second pick, selected Evan Turner from Ohio State University. The New Jersey Nets, who had the worst win–loss record in the previous season, used the third pick to select Derrick Favors from Georgia Tech.

The 2010 NBA draft was the last draft conducted at Madison Square Garden. The 2011 and 2012 NBA drafts were temporarily moved to Prudential Center in Newark, New Jersey, while the 2013 NBA draft would be held at the Barclays Center in Brooklyn, New York as the Garden underwent renovations during those summers of 2011–2013. After 2014, the draft would continue being hosted by the Nets instead of the Knicks, this time at the Barclays Center, despite the renovations for the Madison Square Garden being done by the 2014 deadline, with the only deviation since that time being in 2020 due to the COVID-19 pandemic.

This draft class had no Rookie of the Year because Blake Griffin, who was drafted first overall in the previous year's draft, missed his first season with an injury, but played in the 2010–2011 season and won the award. As of the 2025–26 season, Paul George is the only player from this draft that is still active in the league.

== Draft selections ==
PG	Point guard	SG	Shooting guard	SF	Small forward	PF	Power forward	C	Center

*	Denotes player who has been selected for at least one All-Star Game and All-NBA Team
^{+}	Denotes player who has been selected for at least one All-Star Game
^{#}	Denotes player who has never appeared in an NBA regular-season or playoff game

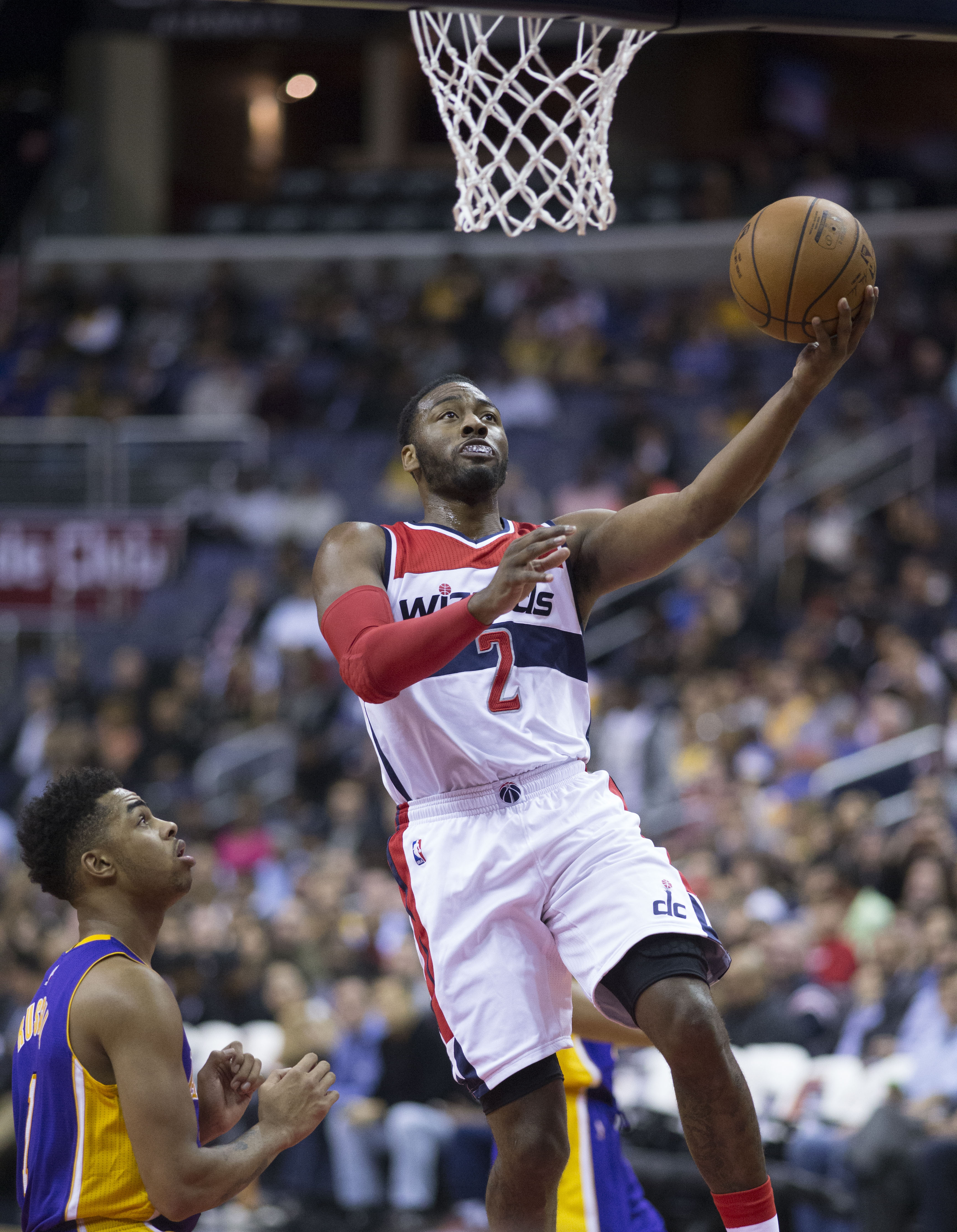
John Wall was selected 1st by the Washington Wizards.

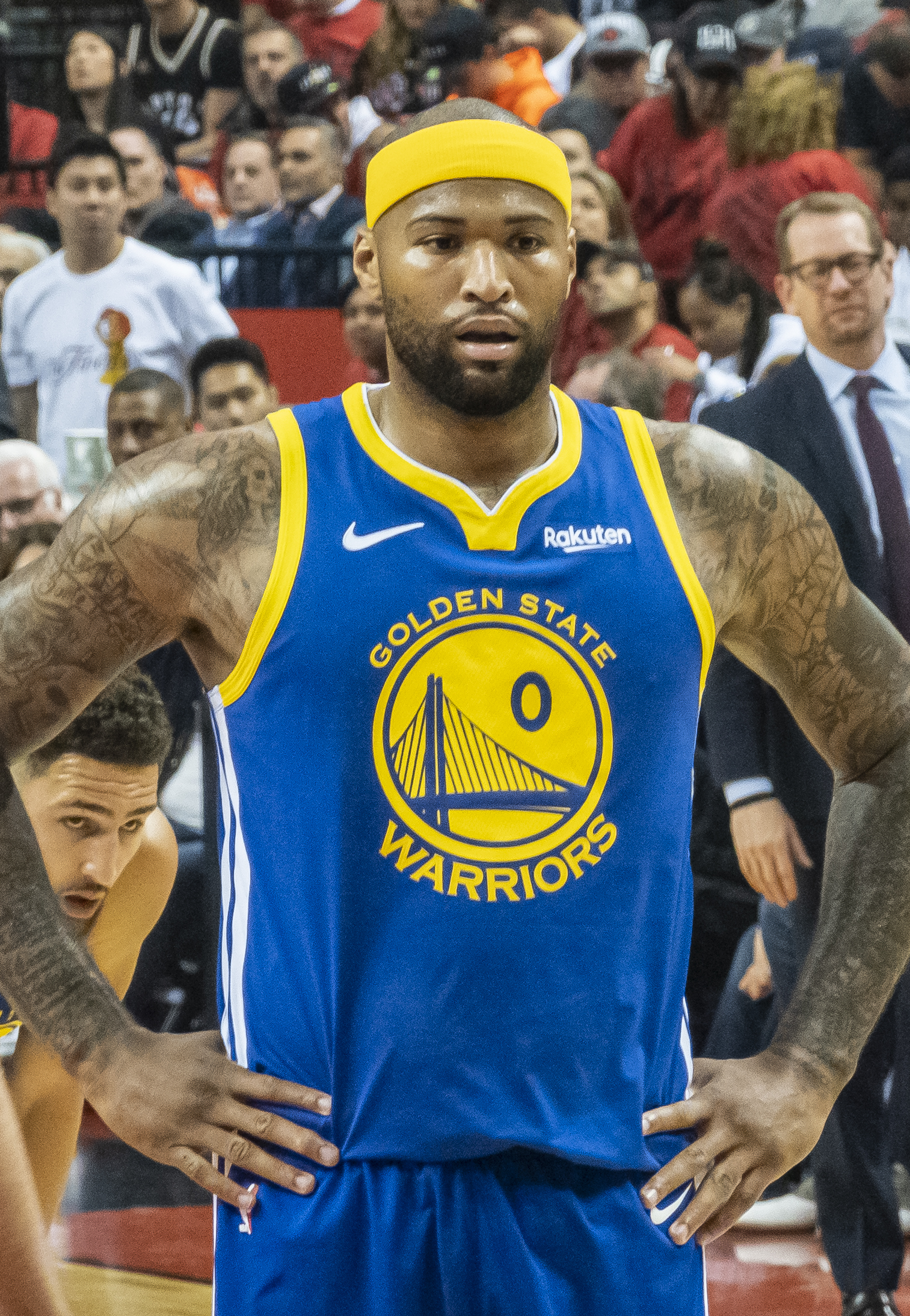
DeMarcus Cousins was selected 5th by the Sacramento Kings.

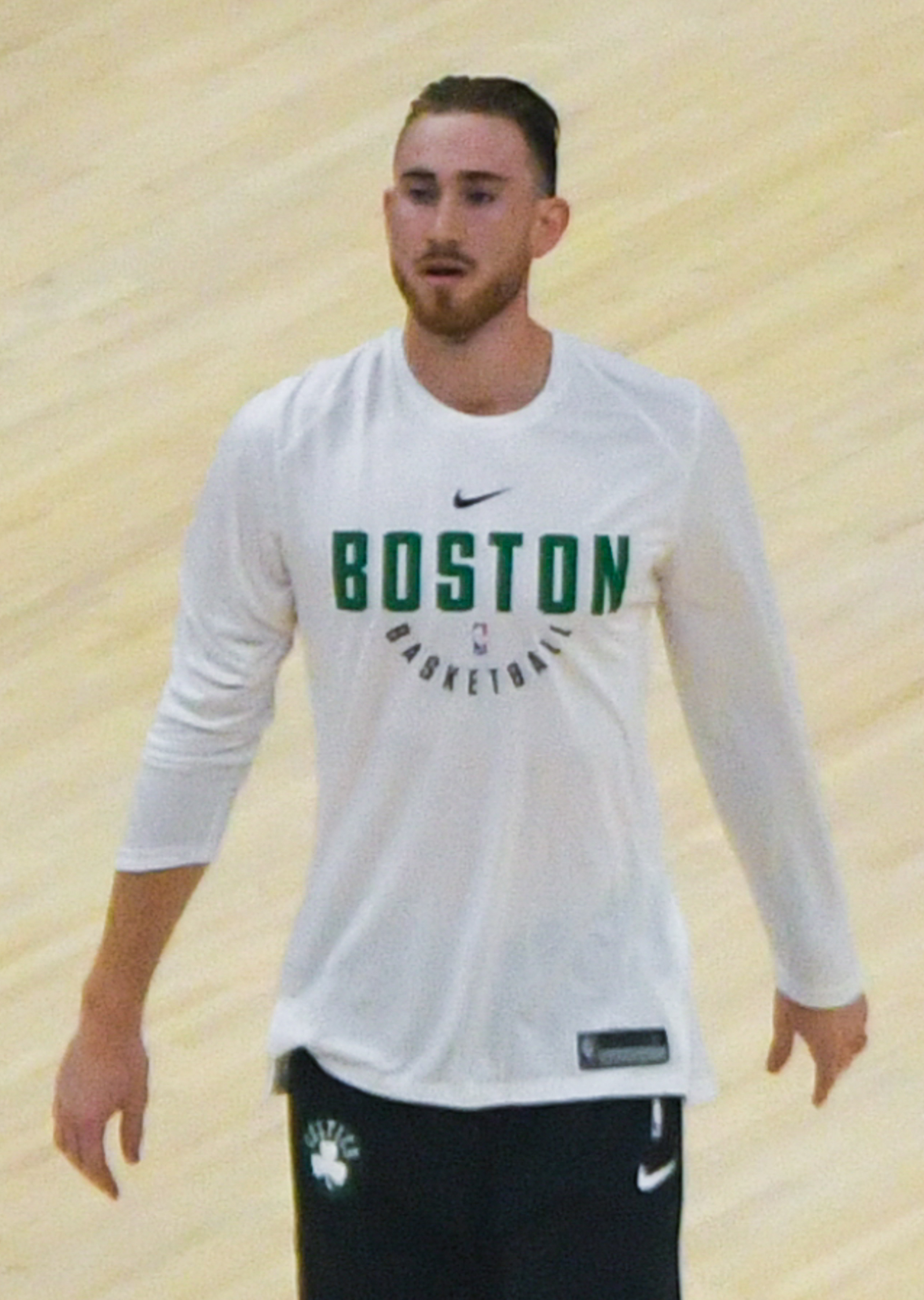
Gordon Hayward was selected 9th by the Utah Jazz.

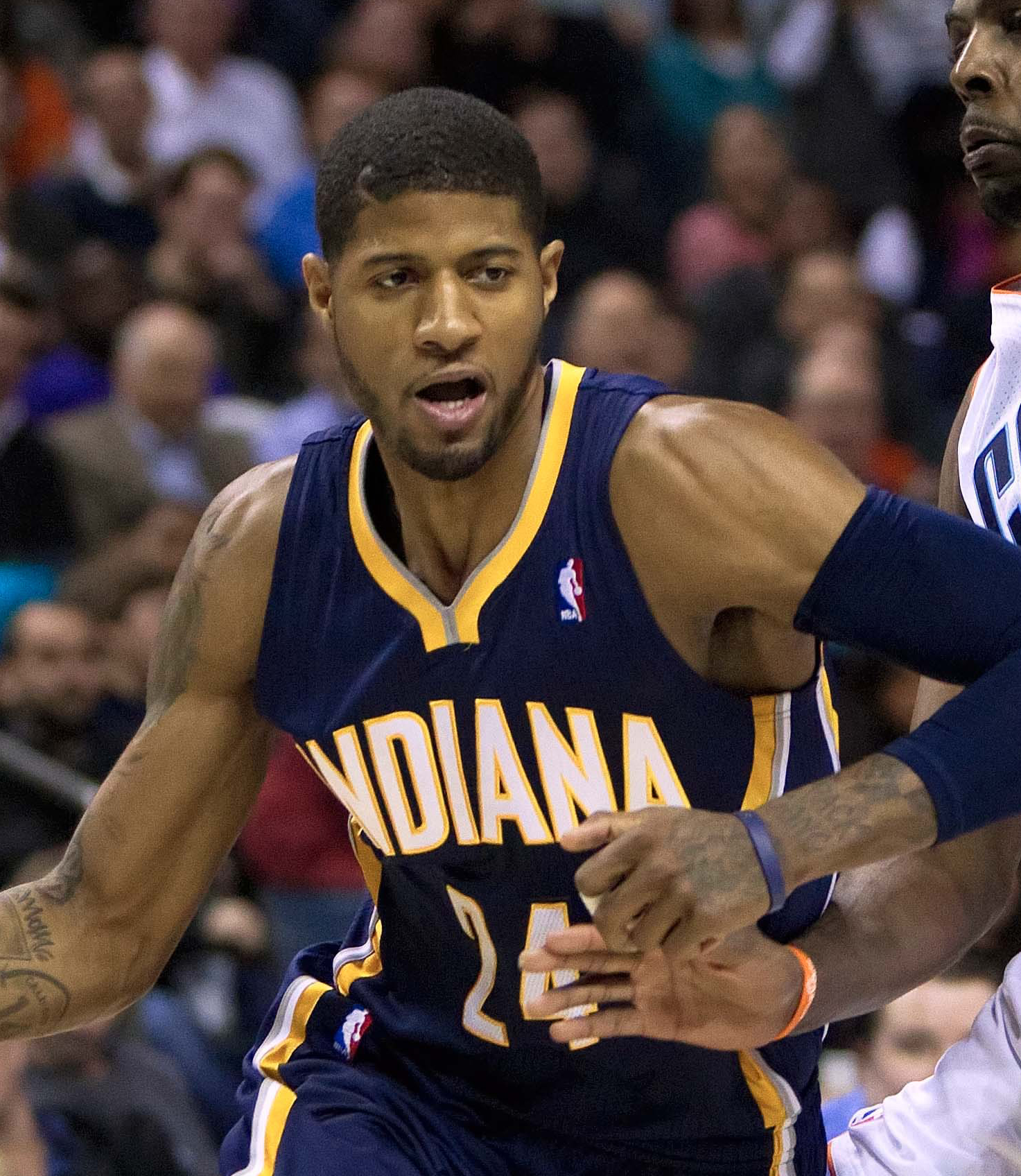
Paul George was selected 10th by the Indiana Pacers.

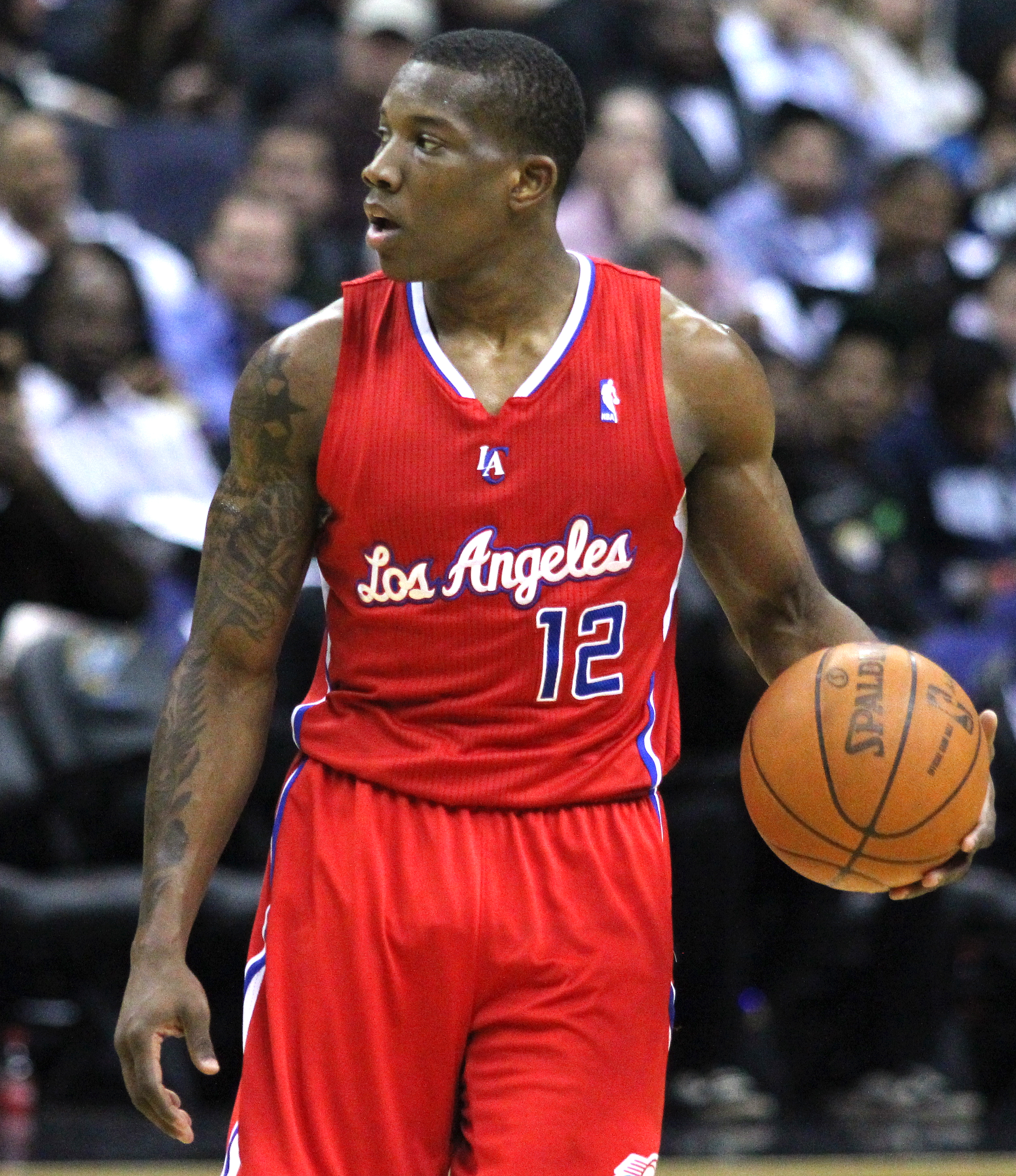
Eric Bledsoe was selected 18th by the Oklahoma City Thunder and was traded to the Los Angeles Clippers.

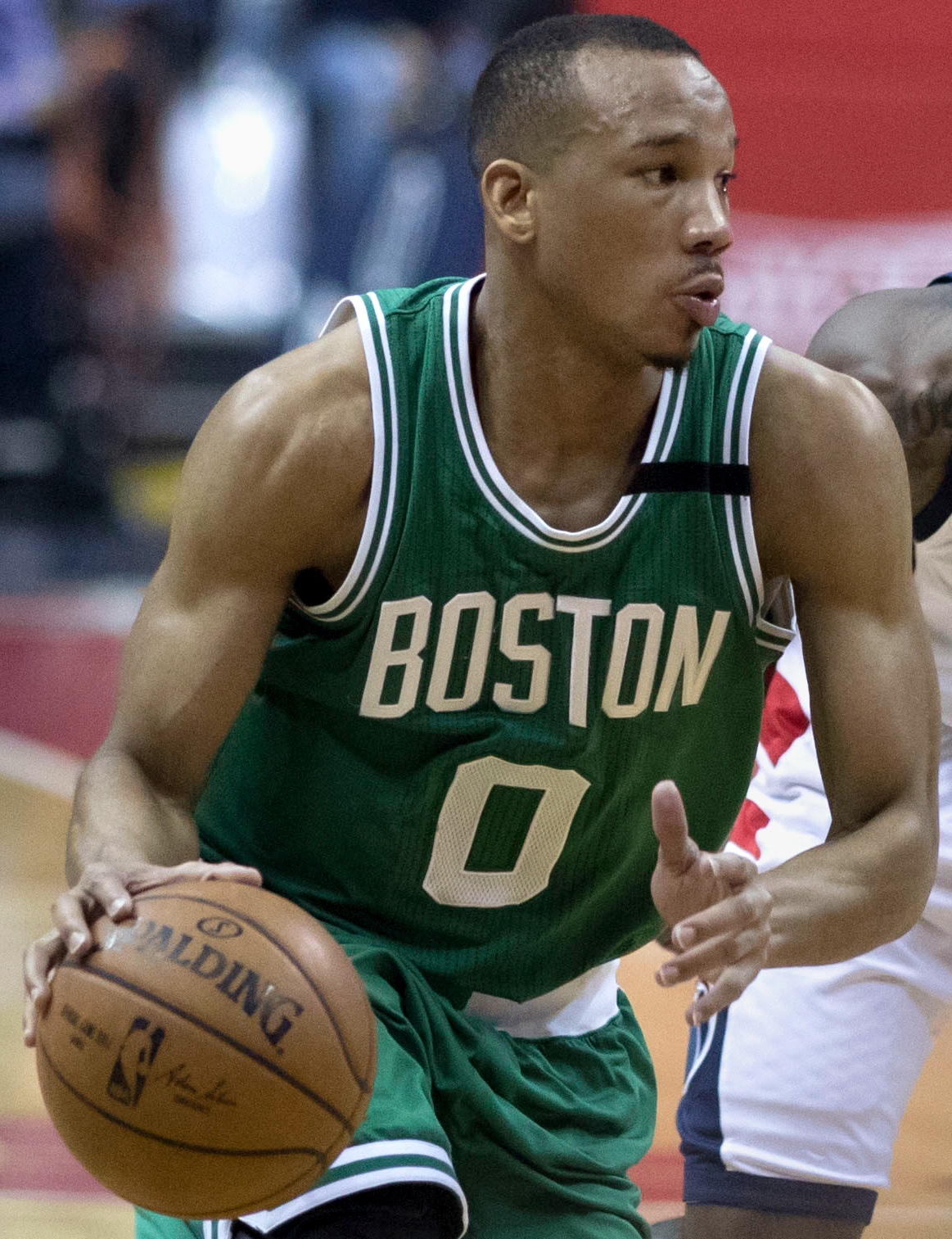
Avery Bradley was selected 19th by the Boston Celtics.

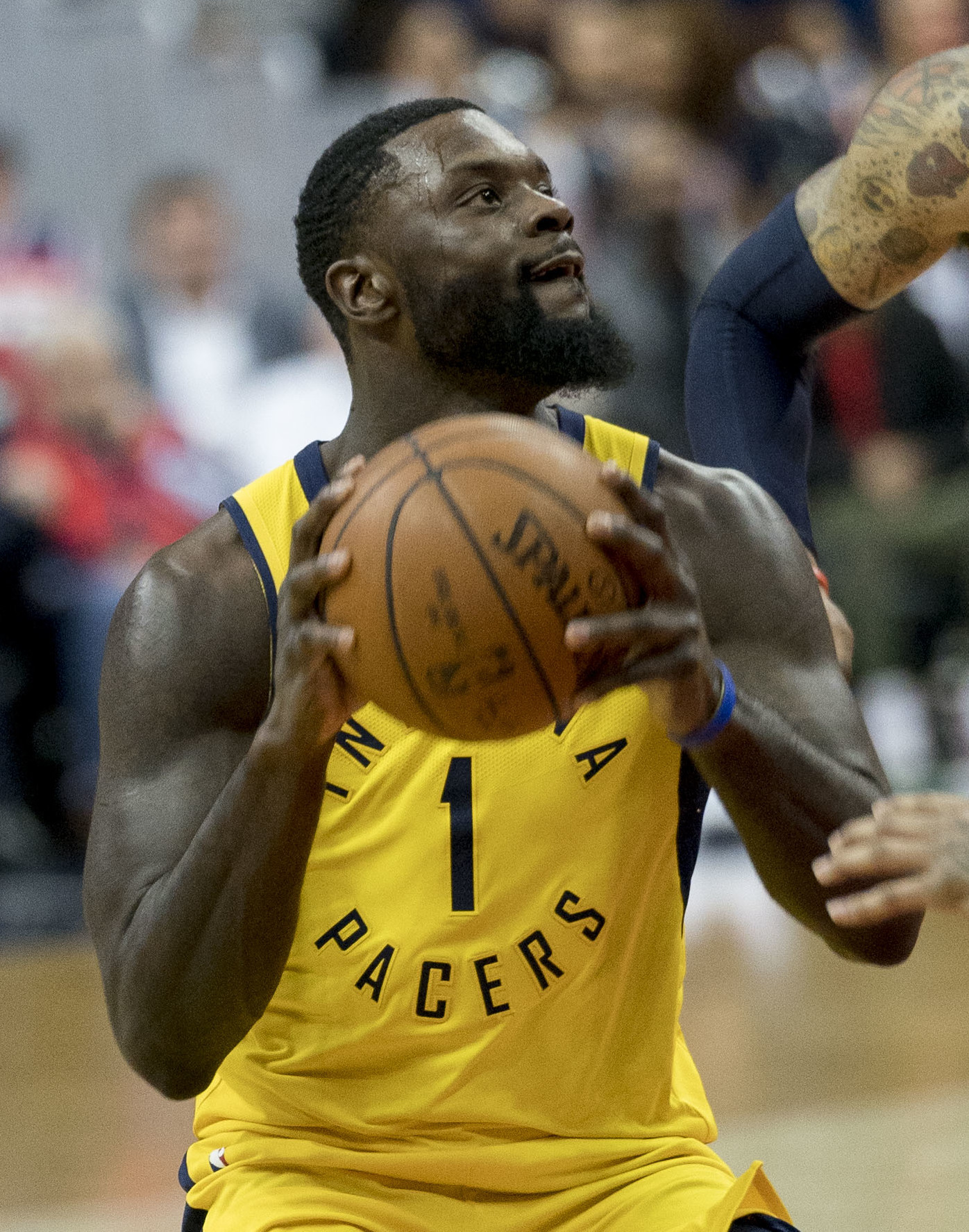
Lance Stephenson was selected 40th by the Indiana Pacers.

Round	Pick	Player	Position	Nationality (Note: Nationality indicates the player's national team or representative nationality. If a player has not competed at the international level, then the nationality indicates the national team which the player is eligible to represent according to FIBA rules.)	Team	School/club team
1	1	John Wall^{*}	PG	United States	Washington Wizards	Kentucky (Fr.)
1	2	Evan Turner	SF/SG	United States	Philadelphia 76ers	Ohio State (Jr.)
1	3	Derrick Favors	PF	United States	New Jersey Nets	Georgia Tech (Fr.)
1	4	Wesley Johnson	SF	United States	Minnesota Timberwolves	Syracuse (Jr.)
1	5	DeMarcus Cousins^{*}	C	United States	Sacramento Kings	Kentucky (Fr.)
1	6	Ekpe Udoh	C	United States; Nigeria	Golden State Warriors	Baylor (Jr.)
1	7	Greg Monroe	C	United States	Detroit Pistons	Georgetown (So.)
1	8	Al-Farouq Aminu	SF	United States; Nigeria (Note: Al-Farouq Aminu was born in the United States to parents of Nigerian descent. He previously represented the United States at youth level, but has represented Nigeria internationally since 2012.)	Los Angeles Clippers	Wake Forest (So.)
1	9	Gordon Hayward^{+}	SF	United States	Utah Jazz (from New York via Phoenix)^{[a]}	Butler (So.)
1	10	Paul George^{*}	SF/SG	United States	Indiana Pacers	Fresno State (So.)
1	11	Cole Aldrich	C	United States	New Orleans Hornets (traded to Oklahoma City)^{[A]}	Kansas (Jr.)
1	12	Xavier Henry	SG	United States (Note: Xavier Henry was born in Belgium to an American father. He has represented the United States at youth level.)	Memphis Grizzlies	Kansas (Fr.)
1	13	Ed Davis	PF	United States	Toronto Raptors	North Carolina (So.)
1	14	Patrick Patterson	PF	United States	Houston Rockets	Kentucky (Jr.)
1	15	Larry Sanders	C	United States	Milwaukee Bucks (from Chicago)^{[b]}	VCU (Jr.)
1	16	Luke Babbitt	SF	United States	Minnesota Timberwolves (from Charlotte via Denver,^{[c]} traded to Portland)^{[B]}	Nevada (So.)
1	17	Kevin Séraphin	PF	France	Chicago Bulls (from Milwaukee,^{[b]} traded to Washington)^{[C]}	Cholet Basket (France)
1	18	Eric Bledsoe	PG	United States	Oklahoma City Thunder (from Miami,^{[d]} traded to LA Clippers)^{[D]}	Kentucky (Fr.)
1	19	Avery Bradley	SG	United States	Boston Celtics	Texas (Fr.)
1	20	James Anderson	SG	United States	San Antonio Spurs	Oklahoma State (Jr.)
1	21	Craig Brackins	PF	United States	Oklahoma City Thunder (traded to New Orleans)^{[A]}	Iowa State (Jr.)
1	22	Elliot Williams	SG	United States	Portland Trail Blazers	Memphis (So.)
1	23	Trevor Booker	PF	United States	Minnesota Timberwolves (from Utah via Philadelphia,^{[e]} traded to Washington)^{[E]}	Clemson (Sr.)
1	24	Damion James	SF	United States	Atlanta Hawks (traded to New Jersey)^{[F]}	Texas (Sr.)
1	25	Dominique Jones	SG	United States	Memphis Grizzlies (from Denver,^{[f]} traded to Dallas)^{[G]}	USF (Jr.)
1	26	Quincy Pondexter	SF	United States	Oklahoma City Thunder (from Phoenix,^{[g]} traded to New Orleans)^{[A]}	Washington (Sr.)
1	27	Jordan Crawford	SG	United States	New Jersey Nets (from Dallas,^{[h]} traded to Atlanta)^{[F]}	Xavier (So.)
1	28	Greivis Vásquez	PG	Venezuela	Memphis Grizzlies (from L.A. Lakers)^{[i]}	Maryland (Sr.)
1	29	Daniel Orton	C	United States	Orlando Magic	Kentucky (Fr.)
1	30	Lazar Hayward	SF	United States	Washington Wizards (from Cleveland,^{[j]} traded to Minnesota)^{[E]}	Marquette (Sr.)
2	31	Tibor Pleiß	C	Germany	New Jersey Nets (traded to Oklahoma City via Atlanta)^{[F]}^{[H]}	Brose Baskets (Germany)
2	32	Dexter Pittman	C	United States	Miami Heat (from Minnesota via Oklahoma City)^{[d]}	Texas (Sr.)
2	33	Hassan Whiteside	C	United States	Sacramento Kings	Marshall (Fr.)
2	34	Armon Johnson	PG	United States	Portland Trail Blazers (from Golden State)^{[k]}	Nevada (Jr.)
2	35	Nemanja Bjelica	PF	Serbia	Washington Wizards (traded to Minnesota)^{[E]}	Red Star Belgrade (Serbia)
2	36	Terrico White^{#}	SG	United States	Detroit Pistons	Ole Miss (So.)
2	37	Darington Hobson	SF	United States	Milwaukee Bucks (from Philadelphia)^{[l]}	New Mexico (Jr.)
2	38	Andy Rautins	SG	Canada (Note: Andy Rautins was born in the United States to a Canadian father. He has represented Canada internationally since 2006.)	New York Knicks	Syracuse (Sr.)
2	39	Landry Fields	SG	United States	New York Knicks (from L.A. Clippers via Denver)^{[m]}	Stanford (Sr.)
2	40	Lance Stephenson	SG	United States	Indiana Pacers	Cincinnati (Fr.)
2	41	Jarvis Varnado	PF	United States	Miami Heat (from New Orleans)^{[n]}	Mississippi State (Sr.)
2	42	Da'Sean Butler^{#}	SF	United States	Miami Heat (from Toronto)^{[o]}	West Virginia (Sr.)
2	43	Devin Ebanks	SF	United States	Los Angeles Lakers (from Memphis)^{[i]}	West Virginia (So.)
2	44	Jerome Jordan	C	Jamaica	Milwaukee Bucks (from Chicago via Portland and Golden State,^{[k]} traded to New York)^{[I]}	Tulsa (Sr.)
2	45	Paulão Prestes^{#}	C	Brazil	Minnesota Timberwolves (from Houston)^{[p]}	CB Murcia (Spain)
2	46	Gani Lawal	PF	Nigeria (Note: Gani Lawal was born in the United States to a Nigerian father. He has represented Nigeria internationally since 2013.)	Phoenix Suns (from Charlotte)^{[q]}	Georgia Tech (Jr.)
2	47	Tiny Gallon^{#}	PF	United States	Milwaukee Bucks	Oklahoma (Fr.)
2	48	Latavious Williams^{#}	SF	United States	Miami Heat (traded to Oklahoma City)^{[J]}	Tulsa 66ers (D-League)
2	49	Ryan Richards^{#}	PF	United Kingdom	San Antonio Spurs	CB Gran Canaria (Spain)
2	50	Solomon Alabi	C	Nigeria	Dallas Mavericks (from Oklahoma City,^{[r]} traded to Toronto)^{[K]}	Florida State (So.)
2	51	Magnum Rolle^{#}	PF	Bahamas	Oklahoma City Thunder (from Portland via Dallas and Minnesota,^{[d]} traded to Indiana)^{[L]}	Louisiana Tech (Sr.)
2	52	Luke Harangody	PF	United States	Boston Celtics	Notre Dame (Sr.)
2	53	Pape Sy	SF	France	Atlanta Hawks	STB Le Havre (France)
2	54	Willie Warren	PG	United States	Los Angeles Clippers (from Denver)^{[m]}	Oklahoma (So.)
2	55	Jeremy Evans	PF	United States	Utah Jazz	Western Kentucky (Sr.)
2	56	Hamady N'Diaye	C	Senegal	Minnesota Timberwolves (from Phoenix,^{[s]} traded to Washington)^{[E]}	Rutgers (Sr.)
2	57	Ryan Reid	PF	United States	Indiana Pacers (from Dallas,^{[t]} traded to Oklahoma City)^{[L]}	Florida State (Jr.)
2	58	Derrick Caracter	PF	United States	Los Angeles Lakers	UTEP (Jr.)
2	59	Stanley Robinson^{#}	SF	United States	Orlando Magic	Connecticut (Sr.)
2	60	Dwayne Collins^{#}	PF	United States	Phoenix Suns (from Cleveland)^{[u]}	Miami (Sr.)

== Notable undrafted players ==
These players were not selected in the 2010 NBA Draft, but have played in at least one NBA game.

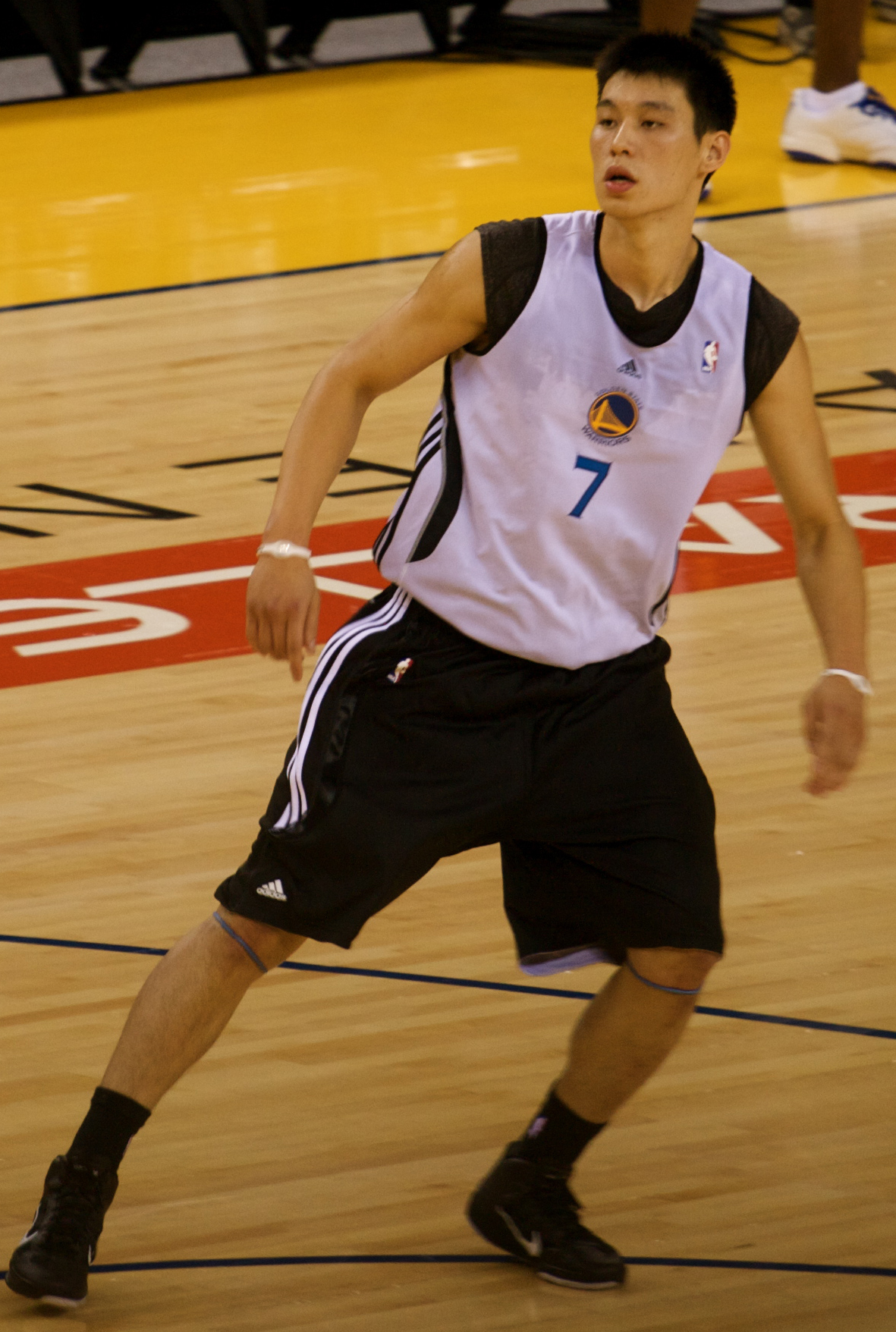
Jeremy Lin went undrafted but enjoyed a nine-season NBA career, capped off by winning an NBA championship with the Toronto Raptors in 2019

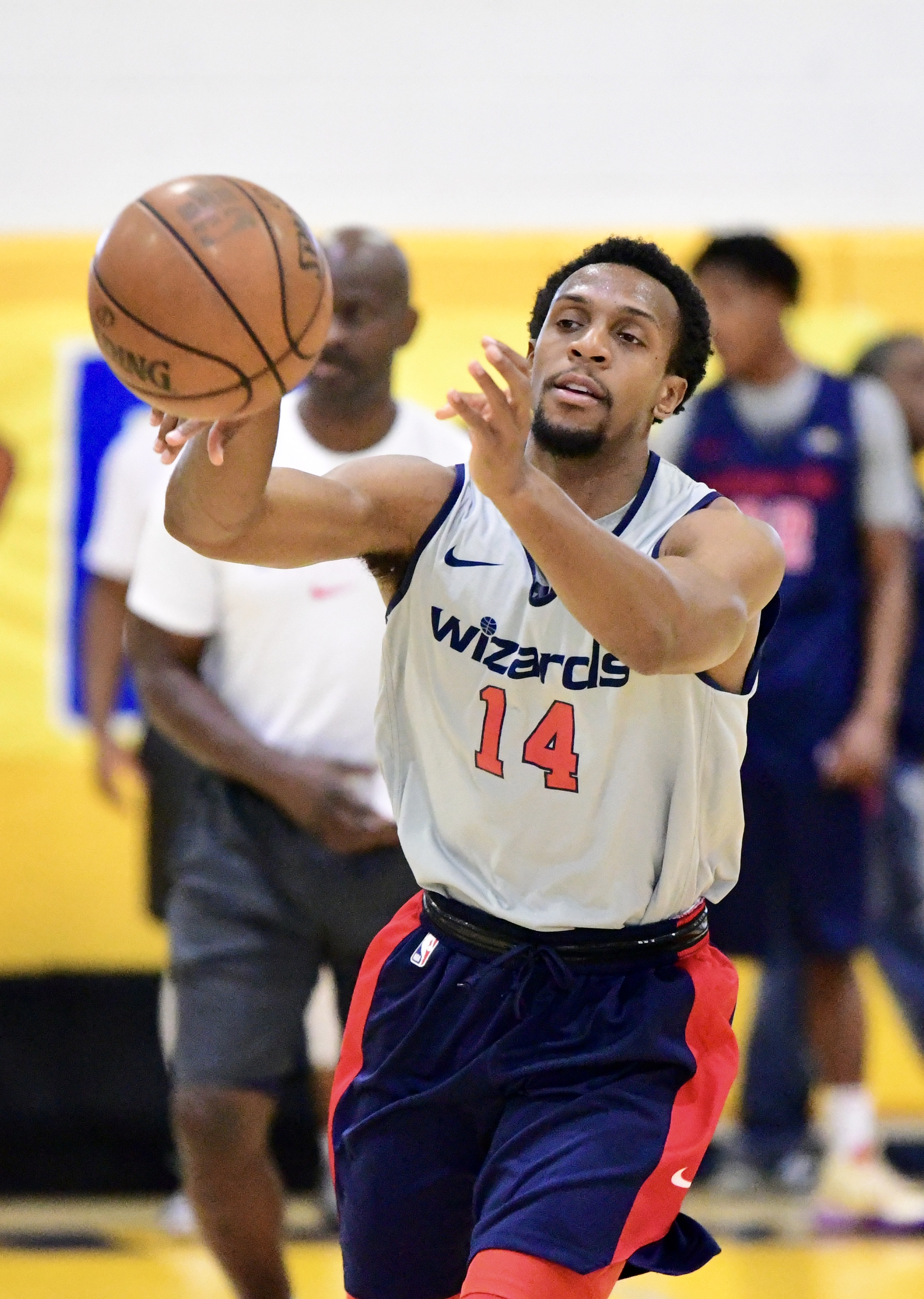
Ish Smith, who went undrafted, played on a record setting 13 different NBA teams.

Player	Position	Nationality	School/club team
Patrick Christopher	SG/SF	United States	California (Sr.)
Sherron Collins	PG	United States	Kansas (Sr.)
Jerome Dyson	G	United States	Connecticut (Jr.)
Courtney Fortson	PG	United States	Arkansas (So.)
Jeff Foote	C	United States	Cornell (Sr.)
Jonathan Gibson	PG	United States	New Mexico State (Sr.)
Manny Harris	PG/SG	United States	Michigan (Jr.)
Dennis Horner	PF	United States	North Carolina State (Sr.)
Jeremy Lin	PG	United States	Harvard (Sr.)
Boban Marjanović	C	Serbia	KK Hemofarm (Serbia)
Elijah Millsap	SG/SF	United States	UAB (Sr.)
Tim Ohlbrecht	PF/C	Germany	Brose Baskets (Germany)
Arinze Onuaku	PF/C	United States	Syracuse (Sr.)
Miroslav Raduljica	C	Serbia	Efes Pilsen (Turkey)
Samardo Samuels	PF/C	Jamaica	Louisville (So.)
Alexey Shved	PG/SG	Russia	CSKA Moscow (Russia)
Donald Sloan	PG	United States	Texas A&M (Sr.)
Ish Smith	G	United States	Wake Forest (Sr.)
Jerry Smith	G	United States	Louisville (Sr.)
Lance Thomas	PF	United States	Duke (Sr.)
Edwin Ubiles	SG/SF	United States	Siena (Sr.)
Ben Uzoh	PG	United States; Nigeria	Tulsa (Sr.)

== Trades involving draft picks ==
=== Pre-draft trades ===
Prior to the day of the draft, the following trades were made and resulted in exchanges of draft picks between the teams.

- ^{a 1} ^{2} On February 12, 2004, Utah acquired Tom Gugliotta, New York's 2004 and 2010 first-round picks, a 2005 second-round pick and cash considerations from Phoenix in exchange for Keon Clark and Ben Handlogten. Previously, Phoenix acquired Antonio McDyess, Howard Eisley, Charlie Ward, Maciej Lampe, the draft rights to Miloš Vujanić, two first-round picks and cash considerations on January 5, 2004, from New York in exchange for Stephon Marbury, Penny Hardaway and Cezary Trybański.
- ^{b 1} ^{2} On February 18, 2010, Milwaukee acquired John Salmons, 2011 and 2012 second-round picks and the option to swap 2010 first-round picks from Chicago in exchange for Hakim Warrick and Joe Alexander. The option to swap 2010 first-round picks was exercised, hence Milwaukee acquired Chicago's first-round pick and Chicago acquired Milwaukee's first-round pick.
- ^{c} On June 25, 2009, Minnesota acquired Charlotte's first-round pick from Denver in exchange for the draft rights to Ty Lawson. Previously, Denver acquired a first-round pick on June 25, 2008, from Charlotte in exchange for the 20th pick in the 2008 NBA draft.
- ^{d 1} ^{2} ^{3} On June 23, 2010, Oklahoma City acquired Daequan Cook and the 18th pick in the 2010 Draft from Miami in exchange for the 32nd pick in the 2010 Draft. Previously, Oklahoma City acquired Etan Thomas and two second-round picks on July 27, 2009, from Minnesota in exchange for Damien Wilkins and Chucky Atkins. Previously, Minnesota acquired a second-round pick and cash considerations on June 25, 2009, from Dallas in exchange for the draft rights to Nick Calathes. Previously, Dallas acquired a second-round pick, the 24th and 56th picks in the 2009 Draft on June 24, 2009, from Portland in exchange for the 22nd pick in the 2009 Draft.
- ^{e} On July 9, 2008, Minnesota acquired Rodney Carney, Calvin Booth, Utah's 2010 first-round pick and cash considerations from Philadelphia in exchange for a conditional second-round pick (which was top-55 protected and wasn't converted). Previously, Philadelphia acquired Gordan Giriček and a first-round pick on December 29, 2007, from Utah in exchange for Kyle Korver.
- ^{f} On August 7, 2009, Memphis acquired Steven Hunter, a first-round pick and cash considerations from Denver in exchange for a conditional second-round pick.
- ^{g} On July 20, 2007, Oklahoma City (as Seattle) acquired Kurt Thomas, 2008 and 2010 first-round picks from Phoenix in exchange for a 2009 second-round pick.
- ^{h} On February 19, 2008, New Jersey acquired Devin Harris, Trenton Hassell, Maurice Ager, DeSagana Diop, Keith Van Horn, cash considerations, 2008 and 2010 first-round picks from Dallas in exchange for Jason Kidd, Antoine Wright and Malik Allen.
- ^{i 1} ^{2} On February 1, 2008, Memphis acquired Kwame Brown, Javaris Crittenton, Aaron McKie, the draft rights to Marc Gasol, cash considerations, 2008 and 2010 first-round picks from L.A. Lakers in exchange for Pau Gasol and a second-round pick.
- ^{j} On February 17, 2010, Washington acquired Žydrūnas Ilgauskas, the draft rights to Emir Preldžič and a first-round pick from Cleveland in a three-team trade with Cleveland and the L.A. Clippers.
- ^{k 1} ^{2} On June 22, 2010, Milwaukee acquired Corey Maggette and the 44th pick in the 2010 Draft from Golden State in exchange for Charlie Bell and Dan Gadzuric. Previously, Golden State acquired the 44th pick in the 2010 Draft and cash considerations on June 21, 2010, from Portland in exchange for the 34th pick in the 2010 Draft. Previously, Portland acquired 2009 and 2010 second-round picks from Chicago in a three-team trade on June 26, 2008.
- ^{l} On February 18, 2010, Milwaukee acquired Primož Brezec, Royal Ivey and a second-round pick from Philadelphia in exchange for Francisco Elson and Jodie Meeks.
- ^{m 1} ^{2} On July 28, 2008, New York acquired Taurean Green, Bobby Jones and a second-round pick from Denver in exchange for Renaldo Balkman and cash considerations. Previously, the L.A. Clippers acquired Marcus Camby on July 15, 2008, from Denver in exchange for the option to swap 2010 second-round picks. The options to swap 2010 second-round picks was exercised, hence New York acquired L.A. Clippers' second-round pick via Denver and the L.A. Clippers acquired Denver's second-round pick.
- ^{n} On June 25, 2009, Miami acquired 2010 and 2012 second-round picks from New Orleans in exchange for the draft rights to Marcus Thornton.
- ^{o} On June 13, 2009, Miami acquired Jermaine O'Neal, Jamario Moon, a future first-round pick and a 2010 second-round pick from Toronto in exchange for Shawn Marion, Marcus Banks and cash considerations.
- ^{p} On February 21, 2008, Minnesota acquired Kirk Snyder, a second-round pick and cash considerations from Houston in exchange for Gerald Green.
- ^{q} On December 10, 2008, Phoenix acquired Jason Richardson, Jared Dudley and a second-round pick from Charlotte in exchange for Raja Bell, Boris Diaw and Sean Singletary.
- ^{r} On June 25, 2009, Dallas acquired the draft rights to Rodrigue Beaubois and a second-round pick from Oklahoma City in exchange for the draft rights to Byron Mullens.
- ^{s} On December 29, 2009, Minnesota acquired Alando Tucker, a second-round pick and cash considerations from Phoenix in exchange for Jason Hart.
- ^{t} On October 10, 2008, Indiana acquired Eddie Jones, cash considerations, 2009 and 2010 second-round picks from Dallas in exchange for Shawne Williams.
- ^{u} On June 25, 2009, Phoenix acquired Ben Wallace, Aleksandar Pavlović, a second-round pick and cash considerations from Cleveland in exchange for Shaquille O'Neal.

=== Draft-day trades ===
The following trades involving drafted players were made on the day of the draft.

- ^{A 1} ^{2} ^{3} Oklahoma City acquired Morris Peterson and the draft rights to 11th pick Cole Aldrich from New Orleans in exchange for the draft rights to 21st pick Craig Brackins and 26th pick Quincy Pondexter. The trade was finalized on July 8, 2010, after the new salary cap went into effect and the league moratorium period concluded.
- ^{B} Portland acquired Ryan Gomes and the draft rights to 16th pick Luke Babbitt from Minnesota in exchange for Martell Webster.
- ^{C} Washington acquired Kirk Hinrich, the draft rights to 17th pick Kevin Seraphin and cash considerations from Chicago in exchange for the draft rights to Vladimir Veremeenko. The trade was finalized on July 8, 2010, after the new salary cap went into effect and the league moratorium period concluded.
- ^{D} The L.A. Clippers acquired the draft rights to 18th pick Eric Bledsoe from Oklahoma City in exchange for a future conditional first-round pick.
- ^{E 1} ^{2} ^{3} ^{4} Washington acquired the draft rights to 23rd pick Trevor Booker and 56th pick Hamady N'Diaye from Minnesota in exchange for the draft rights to 30th pick Lazar Hayward and 35th pick Nemanja Bjelica.
- ^{F 1} ^{2} ^{3} New Jersey acquired the draft rights to 24th pick Damion James from Atlanta in exchange for the draft rights to 27th pick Jordan Crawford and 31st pick Tibor Pleiß.
- ^{G} Dallas acquired the draft rights to 25th pick Dominique Jones from Memphis Grizzlies in exchange for cash considerations.
- ^{H} Oklahoma City acquired the draft rights to 31st pick Tibor Pleiß from Atlanta in exchange for cash considerations.
- ^{I} New York acquired the draft rights to 44th pick Jerome Jordan from Milwaukee in exchange for cash considerations. The trade was finalized on July 8, 2010.
- ^{J} Oklahoma City acquired the draft rights to 48th pick Latavious Williams from Miami in exchange for a future second-round pick.
- ^{K} Toronto acquired the draft rights to 50th pick Solomon Alabi from Dallas in exchange for a 2013 conditional second-round pick and cash considerations.
- ^{L 1} ^{2} Indiana acquired the draft rights to 51st pick Magnum Rolle from Oklahoma City in exchange for the draft rights to 57th pick Ryan Reid and cash considerations.

== Draft lottery ==
The first 14 picks in the draft belonged to teams which had missed the playoffs; the order was determined through a lottery. The lottery determined the three teams that would obtain the first three picks on the draft. The remaining first-round picks and the second-round picks were assigned to teams in reverse order of their win–loss record in the previous season. As it is commonplace in the event of identical win–loss records, the NBA performed a random drawing to break the ties on April 16, 2010.

The lottery was held on May 18, 2010, in Secaucus, New Jersey. The Washington Wizards and Philadelphia 76ers beat the statistical odds by winning the first and second overall picks respectively. The New Jersey Nets won the third overall pick.

Below were the chances for each team to get specific picks in the 2010 draft lottery, rounded to three decimal places:

^	Denotes the actual lottery results

Team	2009–10 record	Lottery chances	Pick													
Team	2009–10 record	Lottery chances	1st	2nd	3rd	4th	5th	6th	7th	8th	9th	10th	11th	12th	13th	14th
New Jersey Nets	12–70	250	.250	.215	.177^	.358	—	—	—	—	—	—	—	—	—	—
Minnesota Timberwolves	15–67	199	.199	.188	.171	.319^	.124	—	—	—	—	—	—	—	—	—
Sacramento Kings	25–57	156	.156	.157	.155	.225	.265^	.041	—	—	—	—	—	—	—	—
Golden State Warriors	26–56	104	.104	.112	.121	.099	.373	.178^	.014	—	—	—	—	—	—	—
Washington Wizards	26–56	103	.103^	.111	.120	—	.238	.342	.082	.004	—	—	—	—	—	—
Philadelphia 76ers	27–55	53	.053	.060^	.070	—	—	.440	.331	.045	.001	—	—	—	—	—
Detroit Pistons	27–55	53	.053	.060	.070	—	—	—	.573^	.226	.018	.000	—	—	—	—
Los Angeles Clippers	29–53	23	.023	.027	.032	—	—	—	—	.725^	.184	.009	.000	—	—	—
New York Knicks	29–53	22	.022	.026	.031	—	—	—	—	—	.797^	.121	.004	.000	—	—
Indiana Pacers	32–50	11	.011	.013	.016	—	—	—	—	—	—	.870^	.089	.002	.000	—
New Orleans Hornets	37–45	8	.008	.009	.012	—	—	—	—	—	—	—	.907^	.063	.001	.000
Memphis Grizzlies	40–42	7	.007	.008	.010	—	—	—	—	—	—	—	—	.935^	.039	.000
Toronto Raptors	40–42	6	.006	.007	.009	—	—	—	—	—	—	—	—	—	.960^	.018
Houston Rockets	42–40	5	.005	.006	.007	—	—	—	—	—	—	—	—	—	—	.982^

1: New York Knicks' pick was conveyed to the Utah Jazz via the Phoenix Suns.^{[a]}

== Eligibility ==
The basic eligibility rules for the draft are:

- All drafted players must be at least 19 years old during the calendar year of the draft. In terms of dates, players eligible for the 2010 draft must be born on or before December 31, 1991.
- Any player who is not an "international player", as defined in the collective bargaining agreement (CBA) between the league and its players union, must be at least one year removed from the graduation of his high school class. The CBA defines "international players" as players who permanently resided outside the U.S. for three years prior to the draft, did not complete high school in the U.S., and have never enrolled at a U.S. college or university.

The basic requirement for automatic eligibility for a U.S. player is the completion of his college eligibility. Players who meet the CBA definition of "international players" are automatically eligible if their 22nd birthday falls during or before the calendar year of the draft (i.e., born on or before December 31, 1988). U.S. players who were at least one year removed from their high school graduation and have played professionally with a team outside the NBA (either top-level basketball in another country, or minor-league basketball in North America) were also automatically eligible. Former high school player Latavious Williams meets these criteria, having graduated high school in 2009, skipped college basketball and then played professional basketball in NBA D-League.

A player who is not automatically eligible must declare his eligibility for the draft by notifying the NBA offices in writing no later than 60 days before the draft. For the 2010 draft, this date fell on April 25. Under NCAA rules taking effect with this draft, they only had until May 8 to withdraw from the draft and maintain their college eligibility. Previously, players who declared for the draft could withdraw as late as 10 days before the draft (the withdrawal deadline under the CBA) and still maintain college eligibility. This year, a total of 80 collegiate players and 23 international players declared as early entry candidates. At the withdrawal deadline, 48 early entry candidates withdrew from the draft, leaving 50 collegiate players and five international players as the early entry candidates for the draft.

A player who has hired an agent will forfeit his remaining college eligibility, regardless of whether he is drafted. Also, while the CBA allows a player to withdraw from the draft twice, the NCAA mandates that a player who has declared twice loses his college eligibility. This second provision affected Mac Koshwal, Gani Lawal, and Patrick Patterson, all of whom declared for and withdrew from the 2009 draft.

This draft was expected to see an unusual influx of underclassmen, even compared with recent years, for reasons explained by ESPN.com columnist Eamonn Brennan in an April 2010 piece:

Because of a potential NBA labor dispute and the threat of an impending lockout in 2011, lots of current college basketball underclassmen have a more drastic decision to face. In addition to the traditional risk of injury, future pros will now have to decide if they want to risk the possibility of there not even being an NBA draft in 2011. Expect lots of these guys to cash in as early as possible, and expect this year's draft to be full of players testing the waters and going all-in a year or two before they should.

=== Early entrants ===
==== College underclassmen ====
The following college basketball players successfully applied for early draft entrance.

- (Nigeria) Solomon Alabi – C, Florida State (sophomore)
- (United States) Cole Aldrich – C/F, Kansas (junior)
- (Nigeria) / (United States) Al-Farouq Aminu – F, Wake Forest (sophomore)
- (United States) James Anderson – G, Oklahoma State (junior)
- (United States) Luke Babbitt – F, Nevada (sophomore)
- (United States) Armon Bassett – G, Ohio (junior)
- (United States) Eric Bledsoe – G, Kentucky (freshman)
- (United States) Dee Bost – G, Mississippi State (junior)
- (United States) Craig Brackins – F, Iowa State (junior)
- (United States) Avery Bradley – G, Texas (freshman)
- (United States) Derrick Caracter – F, UTEP (junior)
- (United States) DeMarcus Cousins – F, Kentucky (freshman)
- (United States) Jordan Crawford – G, Xavier (sophomore)
- (United States) Ed Davis – F, North Carolina (sophomore)
- (United States) Devin Ebanks – F, West Virginia (sophomore)
- (United States) Derrick Favors – F, Georgia Tech (freshman)
- (United States) Courtney Fortson – G, Arkansas (sophomore)
- (United States) Tiny Gallon – F, Oklahoma (freshman)
- (United States) Charles García – F, Seattle (junior)
- (United States) Paul George – F, Fresno State (sophomore)
- (United States) Manny Harris – G, Michigan (junior)
- (United States) Gordon Hayward – F, Butler (sophomore)
- (United States) Xavier Henry – G, Kansas (freshman)
- (United States) Darington Hobson – F, New Mexico State (junior)
- (United States) Armon Johnson – G, Nevada (junior)
- (United States) Wesley Johnson – F, Syracuse (junior)
- (United States) Dominique Jones – G, South Florida (junior)
- (Sudan) Mac Koshwal – F, DePaul (junior)
- (United States) Sylven Landesberg – G, Virginia (sophomore)
- (Nigeria) / (United States) Gani Lawal – F, Georgia Tech (junior)
- (United States) Tommy Mason-Griffin – G, Oklahoma (freshman)
- (United States) Elijah Millsap – F, UAB (junior)
- (United States) Greg Monroe – F, Georgetown (sophomore)
- (Australia) Andrew Ogilvy – C, Vanderbilt (junior)
- (United States) Daniel Orton – F/C, Kentucky (freshman)
- (United States) Patrick Patterson – F, Kentucky (junior)
- (Jamaica) Samardo Samuels – F, Louisville (sophomore)
- (United States) Larry Sanders – F, VCU (junior)
- (United States) John Sloan – G, Huntingdon (junior)
- (United States) Lance Stephenson – G, Cincinnati (freshman)
- (Serbia) Lazar Trifunovic – F, Radford (junior)
- (United States) Evan Turner – G, Ohio State (junior)
- (Nigeria) / (United States) Ekpe Udoh – F, Baylor (junior)
- (United States) John Wall – G, Kentucky (freshman)
- (United States) Willie Warren – G, Oklahoma (sophomore)
- (United States) C. J. Webster – F, San Jose State (junior)
- (United States) Terrico White – G, Ole Miss (sophomore)
- (United States) Hassan Whiteside – C, Marshall (freshman)
- (United States) Elliot Williams – G, Memphis (sophomore)
- (Gabon) Stevy Worah-Ozimo – F, Slippery Rock (junior)
- (United States) Jahmar Young – G, New Mexico State (junior)

==== International players ====
The following international players successfully applied for early draft entrance.

- Thomas Heurtel – G, SIG Strasbourg (France)
- Dusan Korac – F, KK Centar (Montenegro)
- Tibor Pleiß – C, Brose Baskets (Germany)
- (United Kingdom) Ryan Richards – F, CB Gran Canaria (Spain)
- Kevin Séraphin – F, Cholet Basket (France)

== Invited attendees ==
The 2010 NBA draft is considered to be the 32nd NBA draft to have utilized what is properly considered the "green room" experience for NBA prospects. The NBA's green room is a staging area where anticipated draftees often sit with their families and representatives, waiting for their names to be called on draft night. Often being positioned either in front of or to the side of the podium (in this case, being positioned somewhere within The Theater at Madison Square Garden), once a player heard his name, he would walk to the podium to shake hands and take promotional photos with the NBA commissioner. From there, the players often conducted interviews with various media outlets while backstage. From there, the players often conducted interviews with various media outlets while backstage. However, once the NBA draft started to air nationally on TV starting with the 1980 NBA draft, the green room evolved from players waiting to hear their name called and then shaking hands with these select players who were often called to the hotel to take promotional pictures with the NBA commissioner a day or two after the draft concluded to having players in real-time waiting to hear their names called up and then shaking hands with David Stern, the NBA's commissioner at the time.

The NBA compiled its list of green room invites through collective voting by the NBA's team presidents and general managers alike, which in this year's case belonged to only what they believed were the top 15 prospects at the time. Despite having the same number of invites for this year's draft as the previous year's draft, there would still be a notable discrepancy involved with the missing invitation at hand for the #15 pick, Larry Sanders, in order to have a perfect invitation listing for the top 16 draft picks this year. Even so, the following players were invited to attend this year's draft festivities live and in person.

- (United States) Cole Aldrich – C, Kansas
- (United States) / (Nigeria) Al-Farouq Aminu – SF/PF, Wake Forest
- (United States) Luke Babbitt – SF/PF, Nevada
- (United States) DeMarcus Cousins – C, Kentucky
- (United States) Ed Davis – PF/C, North Carolina
- (United States) Derrick Favors – PF/C, Georgia Tech
- (United States) Paul George – SG/SF, Fresno State
- (United States) Gordon Hayward – SF/PF, Butler
- (Belgium) / (United States) Xavier Henry – SG/SF, Kansas
- (United States) Wesley Johnson – SG/SF, Syracuse
- (United States) Greg Monroe – PF/C, Georgetown
- (United States) Patrick Patterson – PF, Kentucky
- (United States) Evan Turner – SG/SF, Ohio State
- (United States) / (Nigeria) Ekpe Udoh – PF/C, Baylor
- (United States) John Wall – PG, Kentucky

== See also ==
- List of first overall NBA draft picks
