= Sam Young (basketball) =

American basketball player (born 1985)

Personal information
- Born: June 1, 1985 (age 41) Washington, D.C., U.S.
- Listed height: 6 ft 8 in (2.03 m)
- Listed weight: 225 lb (102 kg)

Career information
- High school: Friendly (Fort Washington, Maryland)
- College: Pittsburgh (2005–2009)
- NBA draft: 2009: 2nd round, 36th overall pick
- Drafted by: Memphis Grizzlies
- Playing career: 2009–2021
- Position: Small forward / shooting guard
- Number: 4, 7

Career history
- 2009–2012: Memphis Grizzlies
- 2012: Philadelphia 76ers
- 2012–2013: Indiana Pacers
- 2013–2014: Sydney Kings
- 2014–2015: Vaqueros de Bayamón
- 2014: JuveCaserta Basket
- 2015: Halcones de Xalapa
- 2015: Uşak Sportif
- 2015–2017: Al Ahli Dubai
- 2015: Cañeros del Este
- 2015: San Sebastian
- 2016: Guizhou White Tigers
- 2017–2018: Homenetmen Beirut
- 2018–2019: Al Nasr
- 2019–2021: Al Ahli Dubai

Career highlights
- Lebanese Basketball League champion (2018); Lebanese Basketball Cup winner (2018); Arab Club Championship winner (2017); FIBA Asia Champions Cup All-Star Five (2016); All-NBL Second Team (2014); Third-team All-American – AP, SN (2009); 2× First-team All-Big East (2008, 2009); Big East Most Improved Player (2008); Big East All-Rookie Team (2006)
- Stats at NBA.com
- Stats at Basketball Reference

Samuel David Young (born June 1, 1985) is an American former professional basketball player who played four seasons in the National Basketball Association (NBA), among other leagues worldwide. He played college basketball for the Pittsburgh Panthers.

== Early years ==
The eldest of five children, Young was born in Washington, D.C. to single mother Marquet Craig, then 14 years old. She supported her family by working as a cable TV installer for Comcast, and moved the family nine times. By the time Young was in high school, the family had found its way to Prince George's County, Maryland. At Friendly High School in Fort Washington, Young led the Patriots to Maryland state titles in 2003 and 2004, averaging 24.6 points, 14.0 rebounds, and six blocked shots per game as a senior.

After graduating from high school, Young attended Hargrave Military Academy for a year as his high school grades meant that he would have to spend a year at a prep school in order to qualify for a scholarship. He averaged 23 points and 11 rebounds for a team that went 28–1 and was ranked second nationally among prep school programs. The basketball recruiting site Scout.com named Young its National Prep School Player of the Year for 2005. He also received the recruiting attention he had largely missed out on in high school, receiving offers from programs such as Georgia, Maryland, Georgetown, Virginia Tech, and Miami. He would decide to sign with Pitt; Joe Lombardi, then a Pitt assistant and now head coach at Indiana University of Pennsylvania, speculated that Young chose Pitt because "[w]e were there when a whole lot of other people weren't around. He just wanted someone to give him some love."

Considered a four-star recruit by Rivals.com, Young was listed as the No. 17 small forward and the No. 71 player in the nation in 2005.

== College career ==
Young joined the Pitt basketball team for the 2005–2006 season. He initially chafed at his role on the team; he wanted to display his perimeter skills, but head coach Jamie Dixon wanted him to play on the inside. Young nearly transferred to Kansas State after his sophomore year of 2006–07, but when the Wildcats' coach Bob Huggins left for West Virginia after that season, Dixon convinced Young to stay, indicating that he would have a much bigger role on the team in the upcoming season. Dixon's prediction was borne out that season; Young averaged 18 points per game, was named the 2008 Big East tournament MVP after scoring 80 points in the tournament, and was also named the conference's most improved player.

In his senior season at Pitt, Young averaged 19.2 points per game, and was given the honor of being a Third Team All-America. His 2009 NBA draft stock also increased after his spectacular performance in the 2009 NCAA Tournament in which he averaged 23.5 points in four games. He also received accolades from his opposition; Connecticut coach Jim Calhoun, who saw Young score 56 points in two games against his team in Young's senior season, including 31 on Pitt's 2009 Senior Day, said, "There hasn't ever been a player who gives us as many problems as he does."

== The Basketball Tournament ==
Sam Young played for Team ATL AllStars in the 2018 edition of The Basketball Tournament. He had a team-high 29 points and nine rebounds in the team's first-round loss to Louisiana United.

=== College statistics ===
College Statistics

Legend
GP	Games played	GS	Games started	MPG	Minutes per game
FG%	Field goal percentage	3P%	3-point field goal percentage	FT%	Free throw percentage
RPG	Rebounds per game	APG	Assists per game	SPG	Steals per game
BPG	Blocks per game	PPG	Points per game	**Bold**	Career high

Year	Team	GP	GS	MPG	FG%	3P%	FT%	RPG	APG	SPG	BPG	PPG
2005–06 Freshman	Pittsburgh Panthers	33	3	20.4	**.521**	.190	.693	4.4	0.8	.7	0.6	7.9
2006–07 Sophomore	Pittsburgh Panthers	**37**	2	17.2	.458	.310	.597	3.0	.7	.6	0.5	7.2
2007–08 Junior	Pittsburgh Panthers	**37**	**37**	**32.1**	.503	**.383**	.690	**6.3**	**1.2**	**1.1**	**1.1**	18.1
2008–09 Senior	Pittsburgh Panthers	36	36	31.8	.502	.372	**.740**	**6.3**	1.1	1.0	0.8	**19.2**

=== College awards ===
- AP Third-team All-American (2009)
- Sporting News Third-team All-American (2009)
- AP All-American Honorable Mention (2008)
- 2× First-team All-Big East (2008, 2009)
- Big East tournament Most Valuable Player (2008)

== Professional career ==
Young was drafted by the Memphis Grizzlies with the 36th overall pick in the 2009 NBA draft.

On March 15, 2012, Young was traded to the Philadelphia 76ers in exchange for the rights to Ricky Sánchez.

On September 6, 2012, Young signed with the Indiana Pacers. On January 6, 2013, he was waived by the Pacers but was later re-signed on January 28, 2013.

On September 30, 2013, Young signed with the San Antonio Spurs. However, he was later waived by the Spurs on October 10, 2013.

On November 18, 2013, Young signed with the Sydney Kings for the rest of the 2013–14 NBL season. On February 4, 2014, Young was named the Player of the Month for January. In 21 games for the Kings, Young averaged 21.9 points, 5.5 rebounds, 2.3 assists and 1.0 steals per game.

On January 19, 2014, Young signed with Vaqueros de Bayamón of Puerto Rico for the 2014 BSN season.

On July 22, 2014, he signed a one-year deal with Juvecaserta Basket of Italy. On December 31, 2014, he parted ways with Juvecaserta.

On January 14, 2015, he signed with Mexican team Halcones de Xalapa. On April 8, he signed with Muratbey Uşak Sportif of the Turkish Basketball League.

On September 21, 2017, Young signed with Homenetmen Beirut of the Lebanese Basketball League.

== NBA career statistics ==
Legend
GP	Games played	GS	Games started	MPG	Minutes per game
FG%	Field goal percentage	3P%	3-point field goal percentage	FT%	Free throw percentage
RPG	Rebounds per game	APG	Assists per game	SPG	Steals per game
BPG	Blocks per game	PPG	Points per game	**Bold**	Career high

=== Regular season ===
Year	Team	GP	GS	MPG	FG%	3P%	FT%	RPG	APG	SPG	BPG	PPG
2009–10	Memphis	**80**	1	16.5	.451	.196	.777	**2.5**	.7	.4	**.3**	**7.4**
2010–11	Memphis	78	**46**	**20.2**	**.472**	.340	.767	2.4	**.9**	**.9**	**.3**	7.3
2011–12	Memphis	21	2	11.4	.386	.000	**.833**	2.0	.4	.5	.1	3.5
2011–12	Philadelphia	14	0	9.6	.295	**.625**	.643	1.5	.4	.4	**.3**	2.9
2012–13	Indiana	56	3	12.4	.392	.308	.535	2.2	.8	.3	.1	2.8
Career		249	52	15.9	.442	.280	.742	2.3	.7	.5	.2	5.8

=== Playoffs ===
Year	Team	GP	GS	MPG	FG%	3P%	FT%	RPG	APG	SPG	BPG	PPG
2011	Memphis	13	**11**	**19.7**	**.448**	**.250**	.600	**2.3**	.2	**.5**	**.2**	**7.5**
2012	Philadelphia	2	0	2.0	.000	.000	.000	.0	.0	.0	.0	.0
2013	Indiana	**15**	0	8.7	.375	.200	**.750**	1.9	**.3**	.3	.1	1.7
Career		30	11	13.0	.426	.217	.652	2.0	.2	.3	.1	4.1

== Personal life ==
Scott Cacciola of The Commercial Appeal, the daily newspaper of the Grizzlies' home city of Memphis, Tennessee, wrote:

Young has long been known for his work ethic and his determination. At 6-6 and 210 pounds, he plays basketball in a minor key, all angst and controlled rage, motivated by those who had underestimated him, written him off, ignored him.

Young's work ethic borders on the obsessive. While at Pitt, he practiced so much on his own that the coaching staff worried about his knees, and he would regularly play pick-up games at lunchtime during the season. During the summer before his senior year at Pitt, he went so far as to live for a month in a locker room at Pitt's home arena, the Petersen Events Center, sleeping on an air mattress he had carried to the locker room, so he could work out and practice whenever he chose. Young himself admitted that basketball was his "love" and his girlfriend was his "mistress", adding, "And she knows that."

One of Young's closest friends, former high school teammate and later South Florida player Chris Howard, noted that Young's work ethic was present long before he came to Pitt:

This is a guy who'd be at school at 6:30 in the morning working out or at the gym. When he was at Hargrave, there'd be times we'd call each other and be on speakerphone while we were doing push-ups. He's not one of those guys you're going to see in the club. Sometimes he'll call me and say he's going to movies, and I'll joke around and say, 'Who are you going with? Who's the girl?' And he'll say, 'I'm going by myself.' That's the kind of focus you've got to have until you get to the place you want to be.

He also found inspiration in his family. During his year at Hargrave, he put a poster in his dorm room that read "I can't let my mother work harder than I do." He also drew from his brother Michael Spriggs, who was born with cataracts and glaucoma and completely lost his sight at age 13, but nonetheless reached the state championships in high school wrestling and won a gold medal in judo at an international blind sports competition. Young said about his brother, "It could have been me. And I know if he had my opportunities, he'd be doing something constructive with them."

Young's athleticism is not limited to basketball. Before his senior year at Friendly High, he promised to do backflips if the Patriots won the state title, and proceeded to do exactly that. He also reportedly stunned Pitt's diving coach one day by climbing up to the 7½-meter board and performing a nearly perfect 2½ somersault into the pool.

He also writes poetry; he has spoken with a publisher about compiling his works, and read some of his poems at an open-mic night at a Pittsburgh coffeehouse in 2008. He is also a skilled piano player.

== See also ==
- 2009 NCAA Men's Basketball All-Americans
