= Luke Harangody =

American basketball player (born 1988)

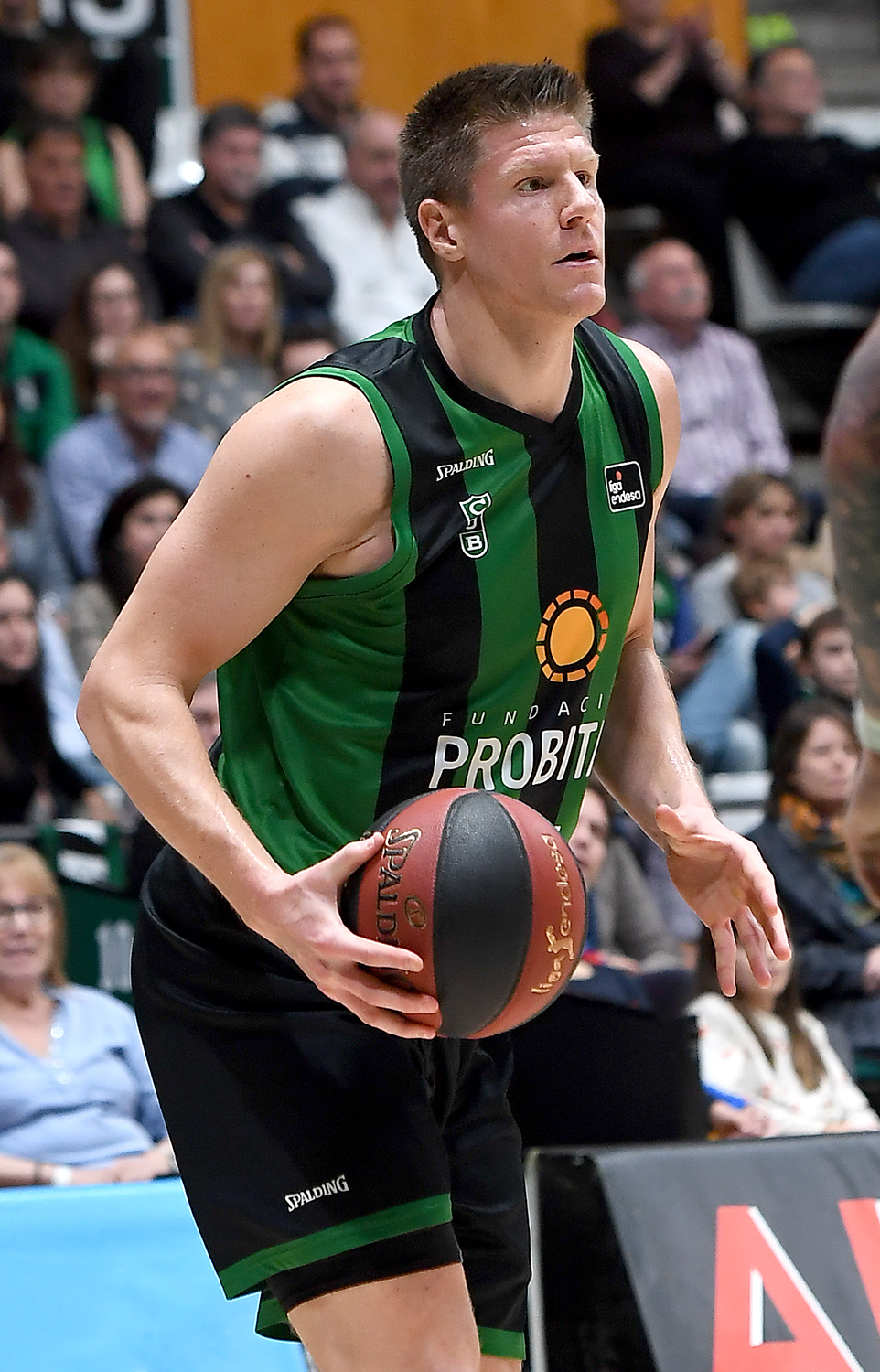

Personal information
- Born: January 2, 1988 (age 38) Decatur, Illinois, U.S.
- Listed height: 6 ft 8 in (2.03 m)
- Listed weight: 240 lb (109 kg)

Career information
- High school: Andrean (Merrillville, Indiana)
- College: Notre Dame (2006–2010)
- NBA draft: 2010: 2nd round, 52nd overall pick
- Drafted by: Boston Celtics
- Playing career: 2010–2020
- Position: Power forward
- Number: 55, 44

Career history
- 2010–2011: Boston Celtics
- 2011–2012: Cleveland Cavaliers
- 2012: →Canton Charge
- 2012–2013: Fort Wayne Mad Ants
- 2013–2014: UNICS Kazan
- 2014–2015: Valencia
- 2015–2017: Darüşşafaka
- 2017–2018: ratiopharm Ulm
- 2018–2020: Joventut

Career highlights
- 3× Consensus second-team All-American (2008–2010); Big East Player of the Year (2008); 3× First-team All-Big East (2008–2010)
- Stats at NBA.com
- Stats at Basketball Reference

Luke Cameron Harangody (born January 2, 1988) is an American former professional basketball player who last played for Divina Seguros Joventut of the Spanish Liga ACB. He completed his college career at the University of Notre Dame in 2010. He is the only men's player in the history of the Big East Conference to average 20 points and 10 rebounds per game in conference play for his career. He was the 2008 Big East Player of the Year, and was named to the second team on the 2008 Associated Press All-America team. He is also the first Notre Dame men's player to be a three-time first-team All-Big East selection (and just 11th overall) (2008–2010), and the first men's player to lead the conference in both scoring and rebounding in consecutive seasons (2008 and 2009).

Harangody considered entering the 2009 NBA draft, but withdrew his name to return to Notre Dame for his senior season. Harangody ended his Notre Dame career as the only player to have over 2000 points and 1000 rebounds.

== Early years ==
Growing up in Schererville, Indiana, Harangody, the son of a former Indiana University football player, had an intense sibling rivalry with his brother Ty, who is 20 months older and was one grade ahead of him in school. The two began with basketball games on a mini-hoop in Harangody's room, which ended when they were kicked out for shaking the light fixtures. The games then moved to a court that their father set up in the basement, and from there to the backyard once they outgrew the basement. Their father soon banned them from the backyard because their one-on-one games almost invariably ended in fistfights, but that only moved their rivalry to local parks. Bigger and stronger, Ty won most of their games; Harangody would later say about those days, "I still look back on that as where most of my competitive nature comes from. To beat him, I'd go all out, all the time." Eventually, the brothers' athletic paths split. Ty followed in their father's footsteps as a football player, eventually earning a scholarship to IU as a tight end; his career was ended by a torn ACL in his sophomore year. Harangody grew 3 inches as a high school freshman and opted for basketball.

Harangody starred at Andrean High School in nearby Merrillville. In his last two high school seasons, he averaged over 20 points and 10 rebounds, was named as the top player in Northwest Indiana by at least one media outlet in each season, and received All-State recognition in Indiana in both seasons.

== College career ==
=== Freshman season ===
Despite Harangody's credentials, he had considerable doubts about his ability to play in the Big East, and much of Notre Dame's recruitment consisted of convincing him he was good enough to play in the conference.

After a double-double against Butler in the second game of the season, Irish head coach Mike Brey considered adding Harangody to the starting lineup, but Harangody hesitated and Brey decided to wait until Big East play. Harangody would go on to start the team's final 16 games.

Harangody went on to average 11.2 points and 6.2 rebounds that season, and was named to the Big East All-Rookie first team. However, conditioning proved to be a problem for him that season; he gained weight during the season (not typical for college athletes), and he played more than 30 minutes only once as a freshman. His conditioning caught up with him in the NCAA Tournament. He played only 17 minutes in Notre Dame's first-round loss to Winthrop, and finished with 4 points and one rebound. About that game, he would later remember that "It was hard to get up and down the court. I hit that wall and there was nothing I could do to get out of it. I never wanted to feel like that again." He then had dinner with his parents shortly after the game, an event which his father clearly remembered in an interview the following season: "On the spot, he says, 'I've got to do something.' He rededicated himself from the minute they lost that game."

=== Sophomore season ===
His rededication began with a change in diet; he and the team's trainer worked on a nutrition program that limited his intake of fried foods and carbohydrates. Harangody also increased the intensity of his workout regimen, in both cardiovascular work and weight training. The work paid off in his sophomore season; his body fat content dropped from 14% at the end of his freshman season to 8% by the end of the 2007–08 season. Harangody also took more of a leadership role on the team, notably berating several of the team's freshmen for giggling in the locker room after a January 19, 2008, loss to Georgetown.

Harangody ended the season averaging 20.4 points and 10.6 rebounds, which made him the Big East's leading scorer and second-leading rebounder. In contrast to his early doubts about his ability to play in the Big East, he had even better numbers in Big East play, with averages of 23.3 points and 11.3 rebounds, which led the conference in both categories. This also made him one of only five players in the previous decade to average 22 points and 11 rebounds in conference play for a BCS conference team. His scoring and leadership led the Irish to a 14–4 conference record and 24–7 regular season record. The Irish also became the first team in Big East men's basketball history to go unbeaten at home in conference play in consecutive seasons. Although the Irish lost in the first round of the Big East tournament to Marquette, Notre Dame earned their second straight NCAA Tournament bid as a #5 seed. The Irish beat George Mason in the first round and went out in the second to Washington State.

After the season, Harangody was named the conference Player of the Year, and was also named to the 1st Team All Big East squad. He was named to the Associated Press' All-America Second Team on March 31, 2008.

=== Junior season ===
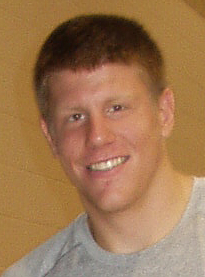
Harangody in his junior year

Harangody never considered declaring for the 2008 NBA draft. With Harangody and fellow All-Big East first-teamer Kyle McAlarney leading an experienced team, the Irish were expected to make a deep run in the 2009 NCAA Tournament, with Dick Vitale naming the Irish #6 in his preseason rankings and Andy Katz placing the Irish in a "next tier" of teams that he effectively ranked from 8th to 16th.

However, Notre Dame had to deal with a possible threat to Harangody's college eligibility during the 2008 offseason. A Boston company, Cellular Services Worldwide, had obtained public domain photos of Harangody and Irish quarterback Jimmy Clausen and used them in an advertisement on a Notre Dame fan site on the Web. Such a use of images of players is a violation of NCAA rules. The school immediately issued a cease and desist letter to the company, which satisfied NCAA requirements and ensured the players' eligibility.

The Fighting Irish finished a disappointing 21–15, losing in the Final Four of the NIT to Penn State after climbing as high as #7 in the polls during the season.

=== Senior season ===
After declaring for the 2009 NBA draft, Harangody withdrew and returned for his senior year at Notre Dame.

The Irish rebounded to reach the Big East semi-finals and the NCAA Tournament. Harangody was named All-Big East for the third year in a row and the All-American team for the third year in a row, making him the first Notre Dame player to be named an All-American 3 years in a row in basketball since Kevin O'Shea.

== Professional career ==
Harangody was selected by the Boston Celtics with the 52nd overall pick in the 2010 NBA draft. On August 10, 2010, Harangody signed a two-year deal with the Celtics. On November 2, 2010, Harangody made his NBA debut in a game against the Detroit Pistons. Harangody was 2-of-2 from the field, and scored four points in three minutes of playing time.

On January 7, 2011, in a 122–102 win over the Toronto Raptors, Harangody achieved career highs of 17 points, 11 rebounds, and two blocked shots.

Harangody was traded to the Cleveland Cavaliers on February 24, 2011, along with teammate Semih Erden in exchange for a second-round draft pick in the 2013 NBA Draft. On January 27, 2012, he debuted in the NBA Development League for Cleveland's affiliate Canton Charge with a double-double of 11 points and a team-high 11 rebounds against the Bakersfield Jam. He added a double-double the following night against the Los Angeles D-Fenders with a team-high 21 points and 11 rebounds. Harangody was recalled by the Cavaliers on February 1, 2012, but reassigned on March 6, 2012. On July 11, 2012, the Cavaliers signed Harangody to a one-year, $1.1 million contract. Harangody was waived by the Cavaliers on November 29, 2012.

On December 28, 2012, Harangody was acquired by the Canton Charge. He was then immediately traded to the Fort Wayne Mad Ants for JaJuan Johnson.

Harangody joined the Denver Nuggets for the 2013 Las Vegas Summer League. On August 8, 2013, Harangody signed a one–year deal with the Russian club UNICS Kazan.

On July 13, 2014, it was announced that Harangody had signed a two-year contract with the Spanish ACB and EuroLeague club Valencia Basket. On June 22, 2015, he parted ways with Valencia.

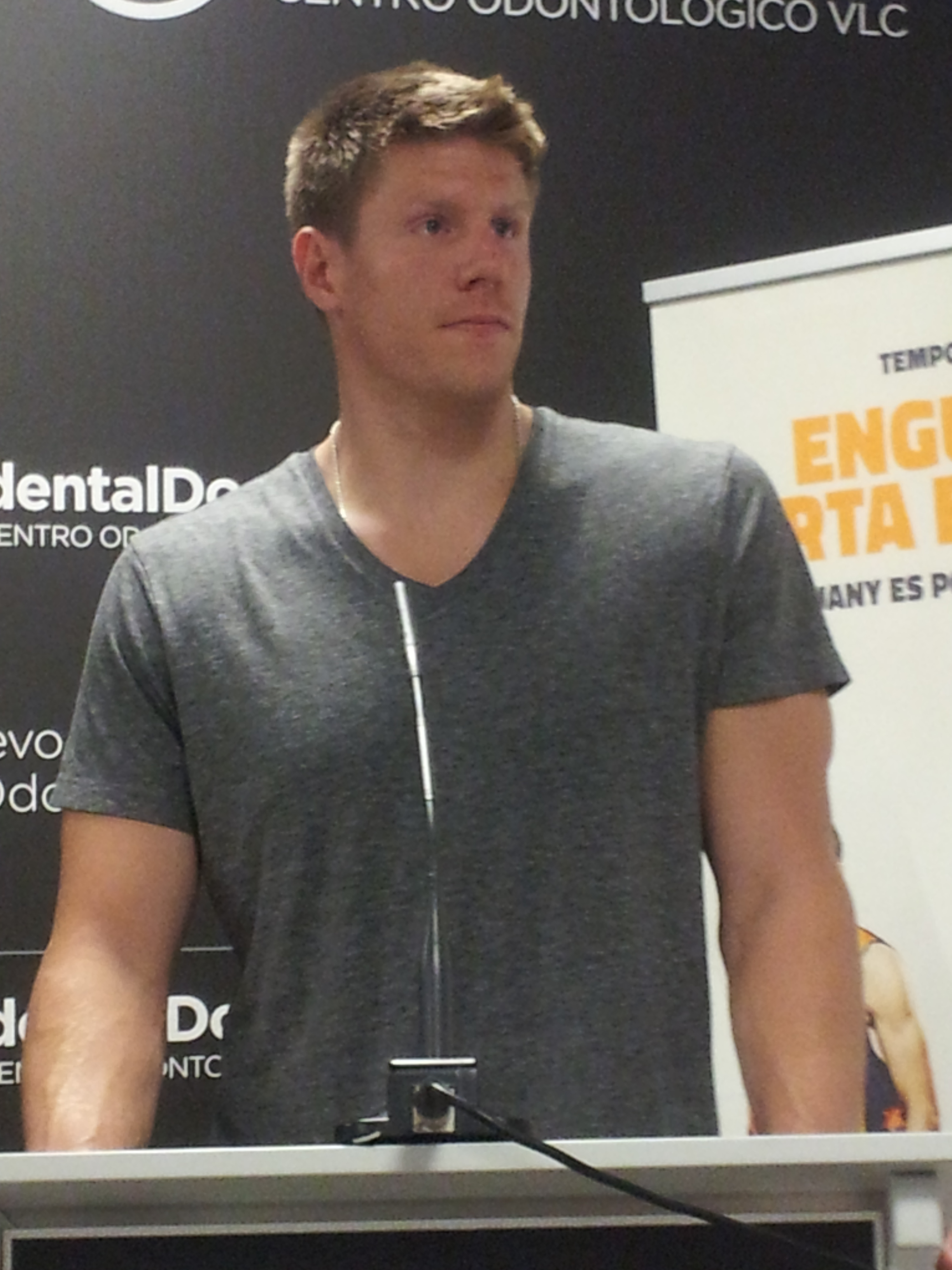
Harangody during his presentation as a Valencia Basket player

In July 2015, Harangody joined the Phoenix Suns for the 2015 Las Vegas Summer League. On August 5, 2015, he signed with the Turkish club Darüşşafaka. On July 21, 2016, he re-signed with Darüşşafaka for one more season.

On July 14, 2017, Harangody signed with German club ratiopharm Ulm for the 2017–18 season. In 31 games played for Ulm (in both the BBL and the EuroCup competitions), he averaged 9.1 points, 5.5 rebounds and 1.1 assists per game.

On October 2, 2018, Harangody returned to Spain for a second stint, signing a one-year deal with Divina Seguros Joventut.

== Career statistics ==
Legend
GP	Games played	GS	Games started	MPG	Minutes per game
FG%	Field-goal percentage	3P%	3-point field-goal percentage	FT%	Free-throw percentage
RPG	Rebounds per game	APG	Assists per game	SPG	Steals per game
BPG	Blocks per game	PPG	Points per game	PIR	Performance index rating
**Bold**	Career high

=== NBA ===
==== Regular season ====
Year	Team	GP	GS	MPG	FG%	3P%	FT%	RPG	APG	SPG	BPG	PPG
2010–11	Boston	**28**	0	8.6	**.394**	.200	.625	2.0	0.4	0.1	0.3	2.3
2010–11	Cleveland	21	0	**19.0**	.378	**.250**	**.778**	**4.2**	**1.0**	**0.5**	**0.5**	**6.2**
2011–12	Cleveland	21	**1**	11.0	.354	.238	.750	2.5	0.3	0.3	0.1	2.9
Career		70	1	12.4	.376	.241	.737	2.8	0.5	0.3	0.3	3.6

==== Career highs ====
- Points: **18** @ New York 03/04/11
- Rebounds: **11** vs. Toronto 01/07/11
- Assists: **3** 3 times
- Steals: **3** vs. Washington 04/14/12
- Blocks: **3** vs. Washington 04/01/11

=== Euroleague ===
Year	Team	GP	GS	MPG	FG%	3P%	FT%	RPG	APG	SPG	BPG	PPG	PIR
2014–15	Valencia	10	8	**23.1**	.535	.486	**1.000**	**4.8**	**.9**	**.8**	**.6**	**10.5**	**12.8**
2015–16	Darüşşafaka	23	**17**	20.6	.559	**.500**	.714	4.3	.6	.4	.2	9.7	10.3
2016–17	Darüşşafaka	**29**	6	12.5	**.605**	.459	.600	2.4	.4	.1	.2	3.8	4.3
Career		33	25	21.4	.552	.495	.846	4.5	.7	.5	.3	9.9	11.1

== Gallery ==
Harangody talks about his adaptation to the European game.

Harangody describes himself as player.

== See also ==
- 2009 NCAA Men's Basketball All-Americans
- 2010 NCAA Men's Basketball All-Americans
- List of NCAA Division I men's basketball players with 2000 points and 1000 rebounds
