= Kyle McAlarney =

American basketball player and coach

Personal information
- Born: July 7, 1987 (age 39) Staten Island, New York, U.S.
- Listed height: 6 ft 1 in (1.85 m)
- Listed weight: 195 lb (88 kg)

Career information
- High school: Moore Catholic (Staten Island, New York)
- College: Notre Dame (2005–2009)
- NBA draft: 2009: undrafted
- Playing career: 2009–2018
- Position: Point guard / shooting guard
- Coaching career: 2018–present

Career history

Playing
- 2009–2010: Fort Wayne Mad Ants
- 2010: Springfield Armor
- 2010–2011: Ikaros Kallitheas
- 2011–2013: CSP Limoges
- 2013–2018: Orléans Loiret Basket

Coaching
- 2018–present: Moore Catholic HS

Career highlights
- LNB Pro B champion (2012)

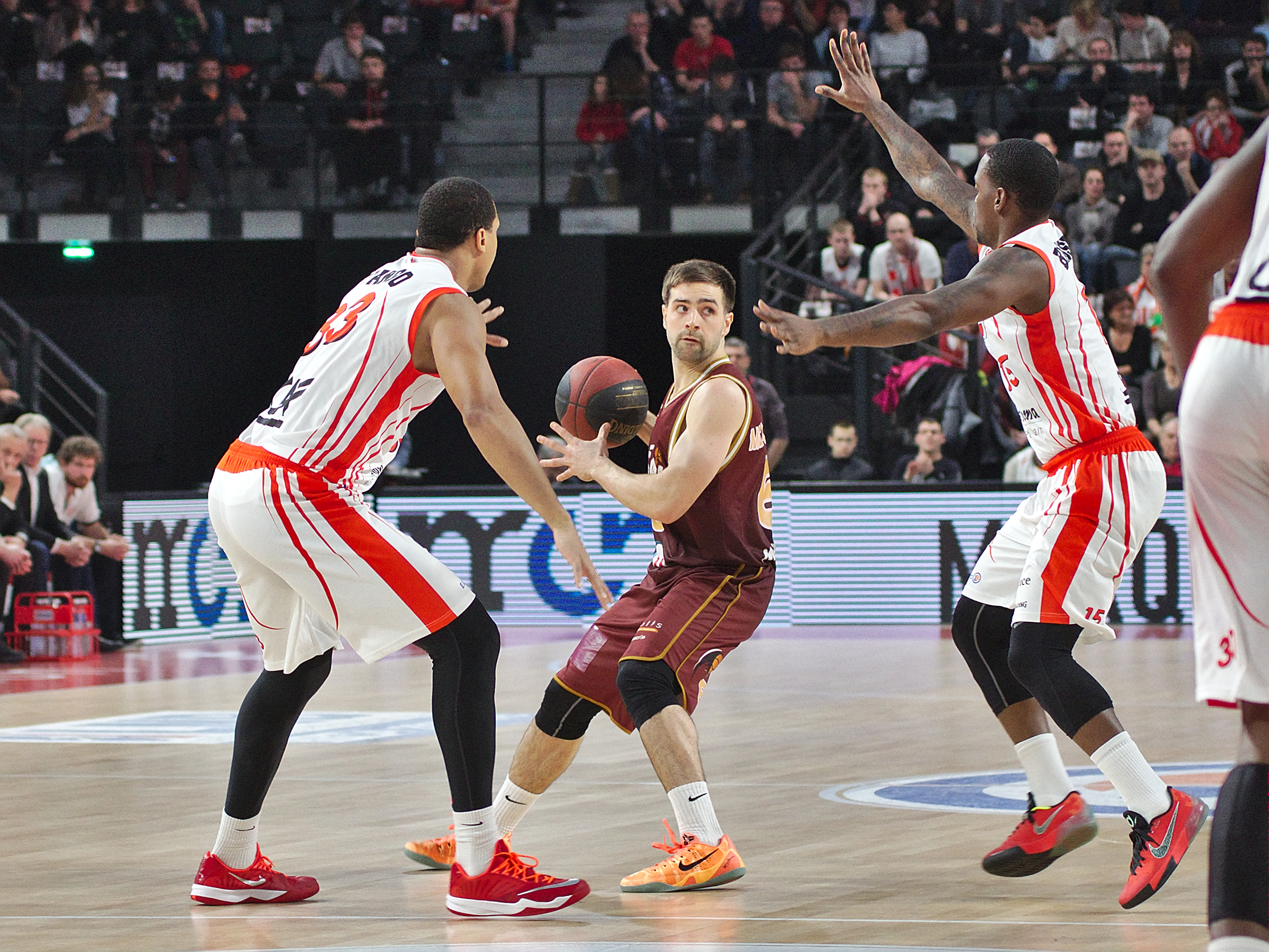
JLB-OLB - 20150124 - 06.jpg

Kyle James McAlarney (born July 7, 1987) is an American high school basketball coach. He played nine professional seasons, last for Orléans Loiret Basket of LNB Pro B. He played college basketball for Notre Dame.

At the close of the 2017–18 season, McAlarney retired from playing to become head coach at his alma mater, Moore Catholic High School in Staten Island, New York.

McAlarney was inducted into the Staten Island Sports Hall of Fame in 2012.

== See also ==
- Staten Island § Basketball
- List of people from Staten Island § Basketball
