= 2026–27 Duke Blue Devils men's basketball team =

American college basketball season

2026–27 Duke Blue Devils men's basketball
- Conference: Atlantic Coast Conference

Ranking
- Coaches: No. 4
- AP: No. 5
- Record: 4–2 (0–0 ACC)
- Head coach: Jon Scheyer (5th season)
- Associate head coach: Chris Carrawell (9th season)
- Assistant coaches: Emanuel Dildy (4th season); Tyler Thornton (2nd season); K.J. Conklin (1st season); Alexander Powell (1st season)
- Home arena: Cameron Indoor Stadium

2026–27 ACC men's basketball standings
	Conf.				Overall
Team	W		L	PCT	W		L	PCT
No. 4 Virginia	0	–	0	–	7	–	0	1.000
Pittsburgh	0	–	0	–	6	–	0	1.000
SMU	0	–	0	–	6	–	0	1.000
Virginia Tech	0	–	0	–	6	–	0	1.000
Boston College	0	–	0	–	5	–	0	1.000
Notre Dame	0	–	0	–	6	–	1	.857
Florida State	0	–	0	–	5	–	1	.833
Georgia Tech	0	–	0	–	5	–	1	.833
No. 17 Miami (FL)	0	–	0	–	5	–	1	.833
NC State	0	–	0	–	5	–	1	.833
Stanford	0	–	0	–	5	–	1	.833
Wake Forest	0	–	0	–	5	–	1	.833
Clemson	0	–	0	–	4	–	1	.800
North Carolina	0	–	0	–	4	–	1	.800
No. 23 Louisville	0	–	0	–	3	–	1	.750
California	0	–	0	–	4	–	2	.667
No. 5 Duke	0	–	0	–	4	–	2	.667
Syracuse	0	–	0	–	4	–	2	.667
† 2027 ACC tournament winner As of November 22, 2026; Rankings from AP poll

The 2026–27 Duke Blue Devils men's basketball team will represent Duke University during the 2026–27 NCAA Division I men's basketball season. The Blue Devils will be led by fifth-year head coach Jon Scheyer. Duke plays their home games at Cameron Indoor Stadium in Durham, North Carolina, as a member of the Atlantic Coast Conference (ACC).

== Previous season ==
The Blue Devils finished the 2025–26 season 35–3 and 17–1 in ACC play to finish in first place. As the first seed in the ACC Tournament, held at the Spectrum Center in Charlotte, North Carolina, they earned a bye to the quarterfinals and narrowly beat Florida State, 80–79, to advance to the semifinals. There, they defeated Clemson 73–61 to advance to the championship game, where they defeated Virginia, 74–70, to win the tournament championship. The championship was their 24th conference tournament victory in program history and their second consecutive championship. As a result, they received the conference's automatic bid to the NCAA tournament as the No. 1 overall seed, and were placed in the East region. In the first round, the Blue Devils trailed No. 16 seed Siena 43–32 at halftime, becoming the first No. 1 seed to trail a 16 seed by double-digits at the half in tournament history. However, they rallied to escape the upset to win 71–65. The Blue Devils proceeded to defeat No. 9 seed TCU 81–58 in the second round and No. 5 seed St. John's 80–75 in the Sweet Sixteen. Against No. 2 seed UConn in the Elite Eight, the Blue Devils took a 19-point lead. However, the Huskies pulled off a comeback in the final seconds, where UConn's Silas Demary Jr. deflected a pass from Cayden Boozer, leading to Huskies guard Braylon Mullins making a game-winning logo three with 0.4 seconds left, to win 73–72.

== Offseason ==
On March 19, 2026, assistant coach Evan Bradds was hired as the head coach of the Belmont Bruins. He remained with Duke throughout the 2026 NCAA tournament.

=== Departures ===
Duke departures
Name	Number	Pos.	Height	Weight	Year	Hometown	Reason for departure
Isaiah Evans	3	G/F	6'6"	180	Sophomore	Fayetteville, NC	Declared for 2026 NBA draft; selected 33rd overall by Brooklyn Nets
Maliq Brown	6	F	6'9"	225	Senior	Culpeper, VA	Graduated/2026 NBA draft; selected 44th overall by San Antonio Spurs
Darren Harris	8	G/F	6'5"	195	Sophomore	Herndon, VA	Transferred to Indiana
Cameron Boozer	12	F	6'9"	250	Freshman	Salt Lake City, UT	Declared for 2026 NBA draft; selected 3rd overall by Memphis Grizzlies
Cameron Sheffield	13	G/F	6'6"	205	Graduate student	Alpharetta, GA	Graduated
Nikolas Khamenia	14	G/F	6'8"	205	Freshman	Studio City, CA	Transferred to UConn
Ifeanyi Ufochukwu	15	C	6'11"	245	Graduate student	Benin City, Nigeria	Graduated
Jack Scott	20	G/F	6'6"	220	Senior	Colorado Springs, CO	Graduated

=== Incoming transfers ===
Duke incoming transfers
Name	Number	Pos.	Height	Weight	Year	Hometown	Previous school
Drew Scharnowski	8	F	6'9"	230	Senior	Burlington, IL	Belmont
John Blackwell	13	G	6'4"	203	Senior	Bloomfield Hills, MI	Wisconsin
Jacob Theodosiou	26	G	6'4"	204	Senior	Waterloo, ON	Loyola (MD)

=== Recruiting class ===
==== 2026 recruiting class ====
College recruiting
Name	Hometown	School	Height	Weight	Commit date
Joaquim Boumtje-Boumtje*; C	St. Petersburg, FL	FC Barcelona Bàsquet B (ESP)	6 ft 11 in (2.11 m)	230 lb (100 kg)	Apr 30, 2026
Joaquim Boumtje-Boumtje*; C	Recruit ratings: 247Sports: On3: ESPN: (95)				
Cameron Williams; PF	Phoenix, AZ	St. Mary's HS	6 ft 11 in (2.11 m)	200 lb (91 kg)	Nov 14, 2025
Cameron Williams; PF	Recruit ratings: 247Sports: On3: ESPN: (94)				
Deron Rippey Jr. PG	Brooklyn, NY	Blair Academy (NJ)	6 ft 1 in (1.85 m)	175 lb (79 kg)	Dec 30, 2025
Deron Rippey Jr. PG	Recruit ratings: 247Sports: On3: ESPN: (91)				
Bryson Howard; SG	Frisco, TX	Heritage	6 ft 4 in (1.93 m)	190 lb (86 kg)	Oct 21, 2025
Bryson Howard; SG	Recruit ratings: 247Sports: On3: ESPN: (89)				
Maxime Meyer; C	Toronto, ON	IMG Academy (FL)	7 ft 1 in (2.16 m)	215 lb (98 kg)	Oct 30, 2025
Maxime Meyer; C	Recruit ratings: 247Sports: On3: ESPN: (82)				
Nick Arnold; PG	Mooresville, NC	Davidson Day School (NC)	5 ft 11 in (1.80 m)	175 lb (79 kg)	May 14, 2026
Nick Arnold; PG	Recruit ratings: No ratings found				
Overall recruit ranking: 247Sports: 1 On3: 1 ESPN: 1
Note: In many cases, Scout, Rivals, 247Sports, On3, and ESPN may conflict in their listings of height and weight.; In these cases, the average was taken. ESPN grades are on a 100-point scale.; Sources: "2026 Duke Blue Devils Recruiting Class". ESPN.; "2026 Team Ranking". Rivals.; "2026 Duke 24/7 Sports Commits". 247Sports.; "2026 Duke Blue Devils Basketball Industry Comparison Commits". On3.

- Boumtje-Boumtje reclassified from the class of 2027 to 2026 in committing.

2026 overall class rankings

Website	National rank	Conference rank	5-star recruits	4-star recruits	Total
ESPN	1	1	4	1	5
On3/Rivals Recruits	1	1	4	1	5
247 Sports	1	1	4	1	5

== Roster ==
2026–27 Duke Blue Devils men's basketball team
Players
Coaches

Pos.	#	Name	Height	Weight	Year	Previous school	Hometown
G	1	Caleb Foster	6 ft 5 in (1.96 m)	200 lb (91 kg)	Sr	Notre Dame HS	Harrisburg, NC
G	2	Cayden Boozer	6 ft 4 in (1.93 m)	195 lb (88 kg)	So	Columbus HS (FL)	Salt Lake City, UT
G	3	Deron Rippey Jr.	6 ft 3 in (1.91 m)	185 lb (84 kg)	Fr	Blair Academy (NJ)	Brooklyn, NY
G/F	5	Sebastian Wilkins	6 ft 8 in (2.03 m)	220 lb (100 kg)	So	Brewster Academy	Boston, MA
G/F	7	Dame Sarr	6 ft 8 in (2.03 m)	200 lb (91 kg)	So	FC Barcelona	Oderzo, Italy
F	8	Drew Scharnowski	6 ft 10 in (2.08 m)	240 lb (109 kg)	Sr	Belmont	Burlington, IL
G	12	Bryson Howard	6 ft 4 in (1.93 m)	190 lb (86 kg)	Fr	Heritage	Frisco, TX
G	13	John Blackwell	6 ft 5 in (1.96 m)	205 lb (93 kg)	Sr	Wisconsin	Bloomfield Hills, MI
F	14	Cameron Williams	7 ft 0 in (2.13 m)	215 lb (98 kg)	Fr	St. Mary's HS	Phoenix, AZ
C	15	Maxime Meyer	7 ft 1 in (2.16 m)	225 lb (102 kg)	Fr	IMG Academy (FL)	Toronto, ON
C	21	Patrick Ngongba II	6 ft 11 in (2.11 m)	250 lb (113 kg)	Jr	St. Paul VI	Manassas, VA
G	26	Jacob Theodosiou	6 ft 4 in (1.93 m)	205 lb (93 kg)	Sr	Loyola (MD)	Waterloo, ON
F/C	30	Joaquim Boumtje-Boumtje	7 ft 2 in (2.18 m)	250 lb (113 kg)	Fr	FC Barcelona Bàsquet B	St. Petersburg, FL
G/F	50	Brock Davis (W)	6 ft 5 in (1.96 m)	195 lb (88 kg)	GS	Georgetown Day	Washington, D.C.
G	55	Nick Arnold (W)	5 ft 11 in (1.8 m)	175 lb (79 kg)	Fr	Davidson Day	Mooresville, NC

Head coach

- Jon Scheyer (Duke)

Assistant coach(es)

- Chris Carrawell (Duke)
- Emanuel Dildy (Eastern Illinois)
- K.J. Conklin (Illinois State)
- Alexander Powell (Kenyon)
- Tyler Thornton (Duke)

Legend

- (C) Team captain
- (S) Suspended
- (I) Ineligible
- (W) Walk-on
- Injured
- Current redshirt

Roster
Last update: 2026-08-05

== Schedule and results ==
By losing to Michigan State and Illinois in its first five games, Duke had its worst start since the 2020–21 Blue Devils lost to the 2020–21 Spartans and 2020–21 Fighting Illini and when they last failed to make the NCAA Division I men's basketball tournament. The loss to Illinois stopped the nation's longest home win streak at 35 (since a March 2024 lost to North Carolina). Andrej Stojakovic's 46-point outburst for Illinois was the most points ever scored by an opponent in a Duke home game, surpassing Grady Wallace's 43-point performance for South Carolina in February 1957. The 99–76 loss to Illinois was Duke's worst home non-conference loss since joining the Atlantic Coast Conference in the 1953–54 NCAA men's basketball season. It was Duke's worst home loss since 32 points by Michael Jordan contributed to a 24-point loss by the 1982–83 Blue Devils to North Carolina on March 5, 1983. Duke's most recent 20-point loss at home had been given to the 1988–89 Blue Devils by North Carolina.

Date time, TV	Rank^{#}	Opponent^{#}	Result	Record	High points	High rebounds	High assists	Site (attendance) city, state
Exhibition
October 8, 2026*; 7:00 p.m., ACCNX		Belmont	W 102–62		19 – Tied	7 – Tied	4 – Ngongba II	Cameron Indoor Stadium (N/A); Durham, NC
October 20, 2026*; 7:00 p.m., ACCN	No. 2	No. 8 Tennessee	W 103–64		21 – Rippey Jr.	7 – Ngongba II	6 – Boozer	Cameron Indoor Stadium; Durham, NC
October 25, 2026*; 1:00 p.m., ESPN	No. 2	at No. 17 Kansas	W 90–84		28 – Ngongba II	10 – Ngongba II	4 – Ngongba II	Allen Fieldhouse (15,300); Lawrence, Kansas
Regular season
November 2, 2026*; 6:30 p.m., ESPNU	No. 2	Army	W 84–50	1–0	16 – Sarr	7 – Tied	3 – Tied	Cameron Indoor Stadium (9,314); Durham, NC
November 5, 2026*; 8:00 p.m., ACCN	No. 2	Coastal Carolina	W 113–52	2–0	28 – Ngongba II	11 – Wilkins	12 – Boozer	Cameron Indoor Stadium (9,314); Durham, NC
November 10, 2026*; 7:00 p.m., ESPN	No. 2	vs. No. 5 Michigan State; Champions Classic	L 73–79	2–1	17 – Blackwell	7 – Ngonbga II	6 – Ngonbga II	United Center; Chicago, IL
November 13, 2026*; 8:00 p.m., The CW	No. 2	SIU Edwardsville	W 90–47	3–1	13 – Ngonbga II	10 – Boozer	4 – Tied	Cameron Indoor Stadium (9,314); Durham, NC
November 17, 2026*; 7:00 p.m., ESPN	No. 5	No. 10 Illinois	L 78–99	3–2	17 – Boumtje Boumtje	6 – Foster	7 – Rippey Jr.	Cameron Indoor Stadium (9,314); Durham, NC
November 21, 2026*; 11:00 p.m., ESPN2	No. 5	vs. Washington State; Acrisure Series	W 78–74	4–2	24 – Ngongba II	9 – Ngongba II	4 – Tied	Acrisure Arena; Thousand Palms, CA
November 25, 2026*; 7:00 p.m., Prime Video		vs. UConn						T-Mobile Arena; Paradise, NV
December 1, 2026*; 9:30 p.m., ESPN		at Florida; ACC–SEC Challenge						O'Connell Center; Gainesville, FL
December 4, 2026*; 7:00 p.m., ESPN2		Harvard; Brotherhood Run						Cameron Indoor Stadium; Durham, NC
December 8, 2026*; 9:00 p.m., ESPN		vs. Georgia; Jimmy V Classic						Madison Square Garden; New York, NY
December 15, 2026*; 7:00 p.m., ACCN		Campbell						Cameron Indoor Stadium; Durham, NC
December 17, 2026*; 8:00 p.m., ACCN		Grambling State						Cameron Indoor Stadium; Durham, NC
December 21, 2026*; 7:00 p.m., Prime Video		vs. Texas Tech						Madison Square Garden; New York, NY
December 30, 2026; 7:00 p.m., ESPN		at Georgia Tech						McCamish Pavilion; Atlanta, GA
January 2, 2027; 2:15 p.m., The CW		California						Cameron Indoor Stadium; Durham, NC
January 5, 2027; 7:00 p.m., ESPN/ESPN2		at Syracuse						JMA Wireless Dome; Syracuse, NY
January 9, 2027; 2:00 p.m., CBS		Pittsburgh						Cameron Indoor Stadium; Durham, NC
January 13, 2027; 9:00 p.m., ACCN		Stanford						Cameron Indoor Stadium; Durham, NC
January 16, 2027; 7:00 p.m., ACCN		at Boston College						Conte Forum; Chestnut Hill, MA
January 20, 2027; 9:00 p.m., ACCN		at Wake Forest						LJVM Coliseum; Winston-Salem, NC
January 23, 2027; 2:15 p.m., The CW		Notre Dame						Cameron Indoor Stadium; Durham, NC
January 30, 2027; 4:00/4:30 p.m., ESPN/ESPN2		at Clemson						Littlejohn Coliseum; Clemson, SC
February 1, 2027; 7:00 p.m., ESPN		Miami						Cameron Indoor Stadium; Durham, NC
February 6, 2027; 6:00 p.m./6:30 p.m., ESPN		at Virginia						John Paul Jones Arena; Charlottesville, VA
February 9, 2027; 9:00 p.m., ESPN		at SMU						Moody Coliseum; Dallas, TX
February 13, 2027; 5:30 p.m., ABC		North Carolina; Rivalry						Cameron Indoor Stadium; Durham, NC
February 16, 2027; 7:00 p.m., ESPN/ESPN2		Florida State						Cameron Indoor Stadium; Durham, NC
February 20, 2027*; 8:00 p.m., Prime Video		vs. Gonzaga; Prime College Hoops Showcase						Little Caesars Arena; Detroit, MI
February 24, 2027; 7:00 p.m., ESPN		at Louisville						KFC Yum! Center; Louisville, KY
February 27, 2027; 12:00 p.m., ESPN		NC State						Cameron Indoor Stadium; Durham, NC
March 1, 2027; 7:00 p.m., ESPN		Virginia						Cameron Indoor Stadium; Durham, NC
March 6, 2027; 6:00 p.m./6:30 p.m., ESPN		at North Carolina; Rivalry						Dean Smith Center; Chapel Hill, NC
*Non-conference game. ^{#}Rankings from AP poll. (#) Tournament seedings in parentheses. All times are in Eastern Time.

== Rankings ==
Ranking movements Legend: ██ Increase in ranking ██ Decrease in ranking ( ) = First-place votes
	Week																				
Poll	Pre	1	2	3	4	5	6	7	8	9	10	11	12	13	14	15	16	17	18	19	Final
AP	2 (10)	2 (7)	5																		
Coaches	2 (8)	2 (9)	4 (1)																		
