= 2025–26 Duke Blue Devils men's basketball team =

American college basketball season

2025–26 Duke Blue Devils men's basketball

ACC regular season and tournament champions

NCAA tournament, Elite Eight
- Conference: Atlantic Coast Conference

Ranking
- Coaches: No. 4
- AP: No. 4
- Record: 35–3 (17–1 ACC)
- Head coach: Jon Scheyer (4th season)
- Associate head coach: Chris Carrawell (8th season)
- Assistant coaches: Emanuel Dildy (3rd season); Evan Bradds (1st season); Tyler Thornton (1st season)
- Home arena: Cameron Indoor Stadium

2025–26 ACC men's basketball standings
	Conf.				Overall
Team	W		L	PCT	W		L	PCT
No. 4 Duke †	17	–	1	.944	35	–	3	.921
No. 17 Virginia	15	–	3	.833	30	–	6	.833
No. 24 Miami (FL)	13	–	5	.722	26	–	9	.743
North Carolina	12	–	6	.667	24	–	9	.727
Clemson	12	–	6	.667	24	–	11	.686
No. 23 Louisville	11	–	7	.611	24	–	11	.686
NC State	10	–	8	.556	20	–	14	.588
Florida State	10	–	8	.556	18	–	15	.545
California	9	–	9	.500	22	–	12	.647
Stanford	9	–	9	.500	20	–	13	.606
SMU	8	–	10	.444	20	–	14	.588
Virginia Tech	8	–	10	.444	19	–	13	.594
Wake Forest	7	–	11	.389	18	–	17	.514
Syracuse	6	–	12	.333	15	–	17	.469
Pittsburgh	5	–	13	.278	13	–	20	.394
Notre Dame	4	–	14	.222	13	–	18	.419
Boston College	4	–	14	.222	11	–	20	.355
Georgia Tech	2	–	16	.111	11	–	20	.355
† 2026 ACC tournament winner Rankings from AP Poll

The 2025–26 Duke Blue Devils men's basketball team represented Duke University during the 2025–26 NCAA Division I men's basketball season. The Blue Devils were led by fourth-year head coach Jon Scheyer, and played their games at Cameron Indoor Stadium in Durham, North Carolina, as a member of the Atlantic Coast Conference.

The Blue Devils began the season ranked sixth in the AP poll, and won their opening game against Texas in the Dick Vitale Invitational. They won their next three games before traveling to New York City to participate in the Champions Classic, where they defeated twenty-fourth ranked Kansas. The team won two more games before facing three straight ranked teams. The Blue Devils defeated twenty-second ranked Arkansas by nine points in Chicago and fifteenth ranked Florida by one point at home in the ACC–SEC Challenge. They rounded out the run by defeating seventh-ranked Michigan State by six points in East Lansing. Duke defeated Lipscomb before suffering their first loss of the season, by just a point, to nineteenth-ranked Texas Tech. The Blue Devils had risen to third in the AP poll at the time of the loss, and fell back to sixth after it. They began ACC play with ten straight victories. Over the stretch they faced three ranked teams; Louisville was ranked twentieth for both their meetings and twenty-fourth ranked SMU. Five of the wins were away, and five were at home. The streak included a road trip to California, where the Blue Devils defeated both California and Stanford. The team suffered its first ACC lost on February 7, against rivals and fourteenth-ranked North Carolina. After three more victories, including a ranked win over twentieth-ranked Clemson, Duke's ACC schedule was broken up by a match-up with top ranked Michigan. The Blue Devils were ranked third at the time, and won 68–63 in the neutral site game in Washington, D.C.. The victory propelled Duke to the top of the AP poll, where they would stay for the remainder of the regular season. They finished ACC play with four straight victories, including a win over eleventh-ranked Virginia and a victory in the rivalry re-match against seventeenth ranked North Carolina.

The Blue Devils finished the regular season 29–2 overall and 17–1 in ACC play to finish as regular season champions, successfully defending their title from the previous year. As the top seed in the 2026 ACC tournament, they earned a double-bye into the quarterfinals, where they defeated eight-seed Florida State by one point. They advanced over fifth seed Clemson in the semifinals. They successfully defended their tournament title by defeating second seed and tenth-ranked Virginia in the final, 74–70. The Blue Devils earned the ACC's automatic bid to the NCAA tournament and were the one-seed, and top overall tournament seed. They were placed in the East region. They defeated sixteen-seed Siena in the first round despite trailing in the second half. They defeated nine-seed TCU in the second round 81–58 to advance to the Sweet 16. There they defeated five-seed and tenth-ranked St. John's 80–75. Their tournament run ended against second-seed and seventh-ranked UConn in the Elite Eight on a 35 foot shot by UConn with just 0.4 seconds left, completing a 19 point comeback for the Huskies. The Blue Devils finished with a final record of 35–3.

== Previous season ==
The Blue Devils finished the 2024–25 season 35–4 and 19–1 in ACC play to finish in first place. As the first seed in the ACC Tournament, held at the Spectrum Center in Charlotte, North Carolina, they earned a bye to the quarterfinals and beat Georgia Tech, 78–70, to advance to the semifinals. There, they defeated North Carolina, 74–71 to advance to the championship game, where they defeated Louisville, 73–62, to win the tournament championship. The championship was their 23rd conference tournament victory in program history. As a result, they received the conference's automatic bid to the NCAA tournament as the No. 1 seed in the East region. There, they defeated Mount St. Mary's, 93–49, in the first round, Baylor, 89–66, in the second round, Arizona, 100–93, in the Sweet Sixteen, and Alabama, 85–65, in the Elite Eight to advance to their first Final Four since the 2021–22 season. In the Final Four, despite leading for nearly the entire game, they ultimately lost to Houston, 70–67, ending their chance at a sixth national championship.

== Season ==
The team concluded an undefeated home season, its third of four seasons under Jon Scheyer. It ended the season with 32 consecutive home wins.

== Offseason ==
=== Departures ===
Departures
Name	Number	Pos.	Height	Weight	Year	Hometown	Reason for departure
Cooper Flagg	2	G/F	6' 9"	195	Freshman	Newport, ME	Drafted 1st overall by the Dallas Mavericks in the 2025 NBA draft
Tyrese Proctor	5	G	6' 6"	183	Junior	Sydney, NSW, Australia	Drafted 49th overall by the Cleveland Cavaliers in the 2025 NBA draft
Kon Knueppel	7	G/F	6' 7"	217	Freshman	Milwaukee, WI	Drafted 4th overall by the Charlotte Hornets in the 2025 NBA draft
Khaman Maluach	9	C	7' 2"	250	Freshman	Rumbek, South Sudan	Drafted 10th overall by the Houston Rockets in the 2025 NBA draft, traded to the Phoenix Suns
Sion James	14	G	6' 6"	220	Graduate student	Sugar Hill, GA	Drafted 33rd overall by the Charlotte Hornets in the 2025 NBA draft
Mason Gillis	18	F	6' 6"	225	Graduate student	New Castle, IN	Graduated, signed with Limburg United
Neal Begovich	20	F	6' 9"	230	Graduate student	San Francisco, CA	Graduated
Stanley Borden	52	C	7' 0"	241	Senior	Istanbul, Turkey	Transferred to UTSA
Spencer Hubbard	55	G	5' 8"	157	Graduate student	Los Angeles, CA	Graduated

=== Incoming transfers ===
Incoming transfers
Name	Number	Pos.	Height	Weight	Year	Hometown	Previous school
Ifeanyi Ufochukwu	15	C	6' 11"	240	R senior	Benin City, Nigeria	Rice
Jack Scott	20	G	6' 6"	210	Senior	Pelican Island, NJ	Princeton

On April 28, 2025, former Washington State guard Cedric Coward announced his commitment to Duke as a graduate transfer while keeping his name in the NBA draft. On May 24, after the draft combine, Coward announced he would remain in the draft and forgo playing at Duke.

=== Recruiting class ===
==== 2025 recruiting class ====
College recruiting
Name	Hometown	School	Height	Weight	Commit date
Cameron Boozer #1 PF	Salt Lake City, UT	Columbus (FL)	6 ft 9 in (2.06 m)	250 lb (110 kg)	Oct 11, 2024
Cameron Boozer #1 PF	Recruit ratings: Rivals: 247Sports: On3: ESPN: (98)				
Cayden Boozer #4 PG	Salt Lake City, UT	Columbus (FL)	6 ft 4 in (1.93 m)	205 lb (93 kg)	Oct 11, 2024
Cayden Boozer #4 PG	Recruit ratings: Rivals: 247Sports: On3: ESPN: (90)				
Nikolas Khamenia #3 SF	Los Angeles, CA	Harvard-Westlake	6 ft 8 in (2.03 m)	215 lb (98 kg)	Oct 22, 2024
Nikolas Khamenia #3 SF	Recruit ratings: Rivals: 247Sports: On3: ESPN: (91)				
Dame Sarr; SG	Oderzo, Italy	FC Barcelona (EuroLeague)	6 ft 8 in (2.03 m)	190 lb (86 kg)	May 22, 2025
Dame Sarr; SG	Recruit ratings: 247Sports: On3:				
Sebastian Wilkins* #11 PF	Boston, MA	Brewster Academy (NH)	6 ft 8 in (2.03 m)	220 lb (100 kg)	May 23, 2025
Sebastian Wilkins* #11 PF	Recruit ratings: Rivals: 247Sports: On3: ESPN: (89)				
Overall recruit ranking: Rivals: 3 247Sports: 1 On3: 2 ESPN: 1
Note: In many cases, Scout, Rivals, 247Sports, On3, and ESPN may conflict in their listings of height and weight.; In these cases, the average was taken. ESPN grades are on a 100-point scale.; Sources: "Duke 2025 Basketball Commitments". Rivals.; "2025 Duke Blue Devils Recruiting Class". ESPN.; "2025 Team Ranking". Rivals.; "2025 Duke 24/7 Sports Commits". 247Sports.; "2025 Duke Blue Devils Basketball Industry Comparison Commits". On3.

- Wilkins reclassified from the class of 2026 to 2025 in committing.

2025 overall class rankings

Website	National rank	Conference rank	5-star recruits	4-star recruits	Total
ESPN	1	1	3	1	4
On3 Recruits	1	1	1	3	5
Rivals	3	1	1	2	4
247 Sports	1	1	3	2	6

==== 2026 recruiting class ====
College recruiting (2026)
Name	Hometown	School	Height	Weight	Commit date
Joaquim Boumtje-Boumtje; C	St. Petersburg, FL	FC Barcelona Bàsquet B (ESP)	6 ft 11 in (2.11 m)	230 lb (100 kg)	Apr 30, 2026
Joaquim Boumtje-Boumtje; C	Recruit ratings: 247Sports: On3: ESPN: (95)				
Cameron Williams; PF	Phoenix, AZ	St. Mary's High School (AZ)	6 ft 11 in (2.11 m)	200 lb (91 kg)	Nov 14, 2025
Cameron Williams; PF	Recruit ratings: 247Sports: On3: ESPN: (94)				
Deron Rippey Jr. PG	Brooklyn, NY	Blair Academy	6 ft 1 in (1.85 m)	185 lb (84 kg)	Dec 30, 2025
Deron Rippey Jr. PG	Recruit ratings: 247Sports: On3: ESPN: (92)				
Bryson Howard; SG	Frisco, TX	Frisco Heritage High School	6 ft 4 in (1.93 m)	190 lb (86 kg)	Oct 21, 2025
Bryson Howard; SG	Recruit ratings: 247Sports: On3: ESPN: (89)				
Maxime Meyer; C	Toronto, ON	IMG Academy (FL)	7 ft 1 in (2.16 m)	215 lb (98 kg)	Oct 30, 2025
Maxime Meyer; C	Recruit ratings: 247Sports: On3: ESPN: (82)				
Overall recruit ranking: 247Sports: 1 On3: 1 ESPN: 1
Note: In many cases, Scout, Rivals, 247Sports, On3, and ESPN may conflict in their listings of height and weight.; In these cases, the average was taken. ESPN grades are on a 100-point scale.; Sources: "2026 Duke Blue Devils Recruiting Class". ESPN.; "2026 Team Ranking". Rivals.; "2026 Duke 24/7 Sports Commits". 247Sports.; "2026 Duke Blue Devils Basketball Industry Comparison Commits". On3.

- Boumtje-Boumtje reclassified from the class of 2027 to 2026 in committing.

2026 overall class rankings

Website	National rank	Conference rank	5-star recruits	4-star recruits	Total
ESPN	1	1	4	1	5
On3/Rivals Recruits	1	1	4	1	5
247 Sports	1	1	4	1	5

== Roster ==
2025–26 Duke Blue Devils men's basketball team
Players
Coaches

Pos.	#	Name	Height	Weight	Year	Previous school	Hometown
G	1	Caleb Foster	6 ft 5 in (1.96 m)	205 lb (93 kg)	Jr	Notre Dame HS	Harrisburg, NC
G	2	Cayden Boozer	6 ft 4 in (1.93 m)	205 lb (93 kg)	Fr	Columbus (FL)	Salt Lake City, UT
G/F	3	Isaiah Evans	6 ft 6 in (1.98 m)	180 lb (82 kg)	So	North Mecklenburg	Fayetteville, NC
G/F	5	Sebastian Wilkins (redshirt)	6 ft 8 in (2.03 m)	220 lb (100 kg)	Fr	Brewster Academy	Boston, MA
F	6	Maliq Brown	6 ft 9 in (2.06 m)	225 lb (102 kg)	Sr	Syracuse	Culpeper, VA
G/F	7	Dame Sarr	6 ft 8 in (2.03 m)	190 lb (86 kg)	Fr	FC Barcelona	Oderzo, Italy
G/F	8	Darren Harris	6 ft 5 in (1.96 m)	195 lb (88 kg)	So	St. Paul VI	Herndon, VA
F	12	Cameron Boozer	6 ft 9 in (2.06 m)	250 lb (113 kg)	Fr	Columbus (FL)	Salt Lake City, UT
G/F	13	Cameron Sheffield	6 ft 6 in (1.98 m)	205 lb (93 kg)	GS	Rice	Alpharetta, GA
G/F	14	Nikolas Khamenia	6 ft 8 in (2.03 m)	215 lb (98 kg)	Fr	Harvard-Westlake	Los Angeles, CA
C	15	Ifeanyi Ufochukwu	6 ft 11 in (2.11 m)	240 lb (109 kg)	GS	Rice	Benin City, Nigeria
G/F	20	Jack Scott	6 ft 6 in (1.98 m)	220 lb (100 kg)	Sr	Princeton	Colorado Springs, CO
C	21	Patrick Ngongba II	6 ft 11 in (2.11 m)	250 lb (113 kg)	So	St. Paul VI	Manassas, VA
G/F	50	Brock Davis (W)	6 ft 4 in (1.93 m)	195 lb (88 kg)	Sr	Georgetown Day	Washington, D.C.

Head coach

Jon Scheyer

Assistant coach(es)

Chris Carrawell
Emanuel Dildy
Evan Bradds
Tyler Thornton

Legend

- (C) Team captain
- (S) Suspended
- (I) Ineligible
- (W) Walk-on
- Injured
- Current redshirt

Roster
Last update: 2025-11-04

== Schedule and results ==
Date time, TV	Rank^{#}	Opponent^{#}	Result	Record	High points	High rebounds	High assists	Site (attendance) city, state
Exhibition
October 21, 2025*; 7:00 p.m., ACCNX	No. 6	UCF; Brotherhood Run	W 96–71	–	33 – Cam. Boozer	12 – Cam. Boozer	5 – Cay. Boozer	Cameron Indoor Stadium (9,314); Durham, NC
October 26, 2025*; 7:00 p.m., ESPN2	No. 6	at No. 18 Tennessee	W 83–76		24 – Cam. Boozer	23 – Cam. Boozer	6 – Cam. Boozer	Thompson-Boling Arena (21,678); Knoxville, TN
Regular season
November 4, 2025*; 8:45 p.m., ESPN	No. 6	vs. Texas; Dick Vitale Invitational	W 75–60	1–0	23 – Evans	13 – Cam. Boozer	2 – Tied	Spectrum Center (12,435); Charlotte, NC
November 8, 2025*; 1:30 p.m., The CW	No. 6	Western Carolina	W 95–54	2–0	25 – Cam. Boozer	8 – Cam. Boozer	5 – Tied	Cameron Indoor Stadium (9,314); Durham, NC
November 11, 2025*; 7:00 p.m., CBSSN	No. 4	at Army	W 114–59	3–0	19 – Sarr	9 – Tied	8 – Cay. Boozer	Christl Arena (5,043); West Point, NY
November 14, 2025*; 7:00 p.m., ACCN	No. 4	Indiana State	W 100–62	4–0	35 – Cam. Boozer	12 – Cam. Boozer	5 – Tied	Cameron Indoor Stadium (9,314); Durham, NC
November 18, 2025*; 9:00 p.m., ESPN	No. 5	vs. No. 24 Kansas; Champions Classic	W 78–66	5–0	18 – Cam. Boozer	10 – Cam. Boozer	5 – Cam. Boozer	Madison Square Garden (19,327); New York, NY
November 21, 2025*; 7:00 p.m., ACCN	No. 5	Niagara; Brotherhood Run	W 100–42	6–0	17 – Ngongba II	8 – Ngongba II	5 – Khamenia	Cameron Indoor Stadium (9,314); Durham, NC
November 23, 2025*; 4:00 p.m., ACCN	No. 5	Howard; Brotherhood Run	W 93–56	7–0	26 – Cam. Boozer	12 – Cam. Boozer	6 – Cay. Boozer	Cameron Indoor Stadium (9,314); Durham, NC
November 27, 2025*; 8:00 p.m., CBS	No. 4	vs. No. 22 Arkansas; CBS Sports Thanksgiving Classic	W 80–71	8–0	35 – Cam. Boozer	9 – Cam. Boozer	8 – Foster	United Center (10,766); Chicago, IL
December 2, 2025*; 7:30 p.m., ESPN	No. 4	No. 15 Florida; ACC–SEC Challenge	W 67–66	9–0	29 – Cam. Boozer	6 – Tied	5 – Ngongba II	Cameron Indoor Stadium (9,314); Durham, NC
December 6, 2025*; 12:00 p.m., FOX	No. 4	at No. 7 Michigan State	W 66–60	10–0	18 – Cam. Boozer	15 – Cam. Boozer	5 – Cam. Boozer	Breslin Center (14,797); East Lansing, MI
December 16, 2025*; 6:00 p.m., ACCN	No. 3	Lipscomb	W 97–73	11–0	26 – Cam. Boozer	13 – Cam. Boozer	4 – Cay. Boozer	Cameron Indoor Stadium (9,314); Durham, NC
December 20, 2025*; 8:00 p.m., ESPN	No. 3	vs. No. 19 Texas Tech; SentinelOne Classic	L 81–82	11–1	23 – Cam. Boozer	8 – Cam. Boozer	7 – Cam. Boozer	Madison Square Garden (19,812); New York, NY
December 31, 2025; 4:00 p.m., ACCN	No. 6	Georgia Tech	W 85–79	12–1 (1–0)	26 – Cam. Boozer	12 – Cam. Boozer	4 – Foster	Cameron Indoor Stadium (9,314); Durham, NC
January 3, 2026; 3:45 p.m., CBS	No. 6	at Florida State	W 91–87	13–1 (2–0)	28 – Evans	6 – Tied	9 – Cam. Boozer	Donald L. Tucker Civic Center (6,097); Tallahassee, FL
January 6, 2026; 7:00 p.m., ESPN	No. 6	at No. 20 Louisville	W 84–73	14–1 (3–0)	27 – Cam. Boozer	8 – Tied	4 – Cam. Boozer	KFC Yum! Center (17,656); Louisville, KY
January 10, 2026; 2:00 p.m, ESPN	No. 6	No. 24 SMU	W 82–75	15–1 (4–0)	21 – Evans	7 – Cam. Boozer	4 – Tied	Cameron Indoor Stadium (9,314); Durham, NC
January 14, 2026; 11:00 p.m., ACCN	No. 6	at California	W 71–56	16–1 (5–0)	21 – Cam. Boozer	13 – Cam. Boozer	3 – Tied	Haas Pavilion (11,201); Berkeley, CA
January 17, 2026; 6:00 p.m., ACCN	No. 6	at Stanford	W 80–50	17–1 (6–0)	30 – Cam. Boozer	14 – Cam. Boozer	4 – Brown	Maples Pavilion (7,880); Stanford, CA
January 24, 2026; 12:00 p.m., The CW	No. 5	Wake Forest	W 90–69	18–1 (7–0)	32 – Cam. Boozer	9 – Cam. Boozer	5 – Brown	Cameron Indoor Stadium (9,314); Durham, NC
January 26, 2026; 7:00 p.m., ESPN	No. 4	No. 20 Louisville	W 83–52	19–1 (8–0)	19 – Cam. Boozer	10 – Cam. Boozer	4 – Cam. Boozer	Cameron Indoor Stadium (9,314); Durham, NC
January 31, 2026; 12:00 p.m., ESPN	No. 4	at Virginia Tech	W 72–58	20–1 (9–0)	24 – Cam. Boozer	8 – Cam. Boozer	5 – Cam. Boozer	Cassell Coliseum (8,925); Blacksburg, VA
February 3, 2026; 7:00 p.m., ACCN	No. 4	Boston College	W 67–49	21–1 (10–0)	19 – Cam. Boozer	12 – Cam. Boozer	4 – Brown	Cameron Indoor Stadium (9,314); Durham, NC
February 7, 2026; 6:30 p.m., ESPN	No. 4	at No. 14 North Carolina; Rivalry / College GameDay	L 68–71	21–2 (10–1)	24 – Cam. Boozer	11 – Cam. Boozer	4 – Foster	Dean Smith Center (21,750); Chapel Hill, NC
February 10, 2026; 9:00 p.m., ESPN	No. 4	at Pittsburgh	W 70–54	22–2 (11–1)	21 – Evans	10 – Cam. Boozer	5 – Foster	Petersen Events Center (10,804); Pittsburgh, PA
February 14, 2026; 12:00 p.m., ESPN	No. 4	No. 20 Clemson	W 67–54	23–2 (12–1)	18 – Cam. Boozer	8 – Cam. Boozer	4 – Cam. Boozer	Cameron Indoor Stadium (9,314); Durham, NC
February 16, 2026; 7:00 p.m., ESPN	No. 3	Syracuse	W 101–64	24–2 (13–1)	22 – Cam. Boozer	12 – Cam. Boozer	5 – Brown	Cameron Indoor Stadium (9,314); Durham, NC
February 21, 2026*; 6:30 p.m., ESPN	No. 3	vs. No. 1 Michigan; Rivalry / College GameDay / Capital Showcase	W 68–63	25–2	18 – Cam. Boozer	10 – Cam. Boozer	7 – Cam. Boozer	Capital One Arena (20,537); Washington, D.C.
February 24, 2026; 7:00 p.m., ESPN	No. 1	at Notre Dame	W 100–56	26–2 (14–1)	24 – Cam. Boozer	13 – Cam. Boozer	4 – Cay. Boozer	Purcell Pavilion (9,149); South Bend, IN
February 28, 2026; 12:00 p.m., ESPN	No. 1	No. 11 Virginia	W 77–51	27–2 (15–1)	19 – Evans	9 – Cam. Boozer	6 – Foster	Cameron Indoor Stadium (9,314); Durham, NC
March 2, 2026; 7:00 p.m., ESPN	No. 1	at NC State	W 93–64	28–2 (16–1)	26 – Cam. Boozer	9 – Cam. Boozer	7 – Foster	Lenovo Center (19,367); Raleigh, NC
March 7, 2026; 6:30 p.m., ESPN	No. 1	No. 17 North Carolina; Rivalry / College GameDay	W 76–61	29–2 (17–1)	26 – Cam. Boozer	15 – Cam. Boozer	5 – Cam. Boozer	Cameron Indoor Stadium (9,314); Durham, NC
ACC tournament
March 12, 2026; 7:00 p.m., ESPN	(1) No. 1	vs. (8) Florida State; Quarterfinal	W 80–79	30–2	32 – Evans	12 – Brown	5 – Cam. Boozer	Spectrum Center (17,627); Charlotte, NC
March 13, 2026; 9:30 p.m., ESPN2	(1) No. 1	vs. (5) Clemson; Semifinal	W 73–61	31–2	24 – Cam. Boozer	14 – Cam. Boozer	5 – Cam. Boozer	Spectrum Center (17,711); Charlotte, NC
March 14, 2026; 8:30 p.m., ESPN	(1) No. 1	vs. (2) No. 10 Virginia; Championship	W 74–70	32–2	20 – Evans	8 – Cam. Boozer	8 – Cam. Boozer	Spectrum Center (17,781); Charlotte, NC
NCAA tournament
March 19, 2026; 2:50 p.m., CBS	(1 E) No. 1	vs. (16 E) Siena; First round	W 71–65	33–2	22 – Cam. Boozer	13 – Cam. Boozer	5 – Cay. Boozer	Bon Secours Wellness Arena (13,919); Greenville, SC
March 21, 2026; 5:15 p.m., CBS	(1 E) No. 1	vs. (9 E) TCU; Second round	W 81–58	34–2	19 – Cam. Boozer	11 – Cam. Boozer	5 – Cay. Boozer	Bon Secours Wellness Arena (14,178); Greenville, SC
March 27, 2026; 7:10 p.m., CBS	(1 E) No. 1	vs. (5 E) No. 10 St. John's; Sweet Sixteen	W 80–75	35–2	25 – Evans	10 – Cam. Boozer	3 – Tied	Capital One Arena (19,445); Washington, D.C.
March 29, 2026; 5:05 p.m., CBS	(1 E) No. 1	vs. (2 E) No. 7 UConn; Elite Eight	L 72–73	35–3	27 – Cam. Boozer	8 – Cam. Boozer	6 – Cay. Boozer	Capital One Arena (19,502); Washington, D.C.
*Non-conference game. ^{#}Rankings from AP poll. (#) Tournament seedings in parentheses. E=East. All times are in Eastern.

== Rankings ==
Ranking movements Legend: ██ Increase in ranking ██ Decrease in ranking ( ) = First-place votes
	Week																				
Poll	Pre	1	2	3	4	5	6	7	8	9	10	11	12	13	14	15	16	17	18	19	Final
AP	6	4 (2)	5 (1)	4	4	3 (7)	3 (3)	6	6	6	6	5	4	4	4	3	1 (56)	1 (55)	1 (56)	1 (50)	4
Coaches	5	4 (1)	4 (2)	4 (1)	4 (1)	3 (2)	3 (1)	6	5	6	6	5	4	4	6	3	1 (27)	1 (28)	1 (28)	1 (26)	4
