= 2024–25 Duke Blue Devils men's basketball team =

American college basketball season

2024–25 Duke Blue Devils men's basketball

ACC regular season and tournament champions

NCAA tournament, Final Four
- Conference: Atlantic Coast Conference

Ranking
- Coaches: No. 3
- AP: No. 3
- Record: 35–4 (19–1 ACC)
- Head coach: Jon Scheyer (3rd season)
- Associate head coach: Chris Carrawell
- Assistant coaches: Jai Lucas; Will Avery; Emanuel Dildy
- Home arena: Cameron Indoor Stadium

2024–25 ACC men's basketball standings
	Conf.				Overall
Team	W		L	PCT	W		L	PCT
No. 3 Duke †	19	–	1	.950	35	–	4	.897
No. 21 Louisville	18	–	2	.900	27	–	8	.771
No. 22 Clemson	18	–	2	.900	27	–	7	.794
Wake Forest	13	–	7	.650	21	–	11	.656
North Carolina	13	–	7	.650	23	–	14	.622
SMU	13	–	7	.650	24	–	11	.686
Stanford	11	–	9	.550	21	–	14	.600
Georgia Tech	10	–	10	.500	17	–	17	.500
Virginia	8	–	12	.400	15	–	17	.469
Virginia Tech	8	–	12	.400	13	–	19	.406
Florida State	8	–	12	.400	17	–	15	.531
Notre Dame	8	–	12	.400	15	–	18	.455
Pittsburgh	8	–	12	.400	17	–	15	.531
Syracuse	7	–	13	.350	14	–	19	.424
California	6	–	14	.300	14	–	19	.424
NC State	5	–	15	.250	12	–	19	.387
Boston College	4	–	16	.200	12	–	19	.387
Miami (FL)	3	–	17	.150	7	–	24	.226
† 2025 ACC tournament winner Rankings from AP poll

The 2024–25 Duke Blue Devils men's basketball team represented Duke University during the 2024–25 NCAA Division I men's basketball season. The Blue Devils were led by third-year head coach Jon Scheyer. This season featured the first Duke roster with no regular rotation players from the Mike Krzyzewski era. The Blue Devils played their home games at Cameron Indoor Stadium in Durham, North Carolina, as members of the Atlantic Coast Conference (ACC).

The Blue Devils started the season ranked seventh, and comfortably defeated Maine and Army to open the season. They lost to nineteenth-ranked Kentucky in the Champions Classic before holding Wofford to 35 points in a fifty one-point victory. The Kentucky defeat saw them fall to number twelve in the rankings, where they defeated seventeenth-ranked Arizona 69–55. They then lost to top-ranked Kansas 75–72 in the Vegas Showdown. They rose to ninth for the ACC–SEC Challenge, where they defeated second-ranked Auburn. This victory was the second in what would be a sixteen-game winning streak for the Blue Devils. They rose from eleventh in the rankings at the start, to second in the rankings over the sixteen wins. Twelve of the wins were conference wins, and all the victories were by double digits, except a 63–56 victory over Wake Forest on January 25. The streak was broken by a 77–71 loss at Clemson on February 8. That was the Blue Devils' only ACC loss of the season, as they won the rest of their regular season games. They finished the season on an eight-game winning streak, with all their wins coming by at least thirteen points. Their regular season included a two-game sweep of rivals North Carolina. Duke did not play a ranked opponent during the ACC regular season, and finished the regular season ranked first in the polls.

The Blue Devils finished the regular season 28–3 and 19–1 in ACC play to finish as regular season champions for the twenty-first time. As the first seed in the 2025 ACC tournament, they earned a bye into the quarterfinals, where they defeated eighth seed Georgia Tech 78–70. In the semifinals they faced fifth-seed North Carolina for a third time this season. The Blue Devils won the closest rivalry game of the season 74–71. In the final, they defeated second seed and thirteenth-ranked Louisville 73–62 to win their twenty-second ACC tournament title. The Blue Devils received the ACC's automatic bid to the NCAA Tournament. They were a one-seed in the East region. They defeated sixteen-seed Mount St. Mary's 93–49 in the first round, nine-seed Baylor 89–66 in the second round, and won a rematch with four-seed and twenty first-ranked Arizona 100–93 in the Sweet Sixteen. They faced two-seed and seventh-ranked Alabama in the Elite Eight, and prevailed 85–65 to advance to the Final Four. There, they were bested by the Midwest region top seed and second-ranked Houston 70–67. They finished the season with a 35–4 overall record.

== Previous season ==
The Blue Devils finished the 2023–24 season 27–9 and 15–5 in ACC play to finish in second place. As the second seed in the ACC tournament, they earned a bye to the quarterfinals, where they were upset by in-state rival and tenth seed NC State. They received an at-large bid to the 2024 NCAA Division I men's basketball tournament, where they were the fourth seed in the South Region. They faced Vermont in the first round. They won this matchup to move onto the round of 32, where they routed 12th seed James Madison. Duke then faced the number one seed, Houston, whom they defeated 54–51, advancing to the Elite Eight for the first time under head coach Jon Scheyer. There, they were upset by 11th-seeded and ACC rival NC State to end their season.

== Offseason ==
=== Departures ===
Departures
Name	Number	Pos.	Height	Weight	Year	Hometown	Reason for departure
Jared McCain	0	G	6' 3"	197	Freshman	Sacramento, CA	Drafted 16th overall in the 2024 NBA draft
Jaylen Blakes	2	G	6' 2"	204	Junior	Somerset, NJ	Transferred to Stanford
Jeremy Roach	3	G	6' 2"	180	Senior	Leesburg, VA	Transferred to Baylor
TJ Power	12	F	6' 9"	216	Freshman	Shrewsbury, MA	Transferred to Virginia
Sean Stewart	13	G	6' 9"	227	Freshman	Windermere, FL	Transferred to Ohio State
Jaden Schutt	14	G	6' 5"	190	Sophomore	Yorkville, IL	Transferred to Virginia Tech
Ryan Young	15	C	6' 10"	238	Graduate student	Stewartsville, NJ	Graduated
Christian Reeves	21	C	7' 1"	261	Sophomore	Charlotte, NC	Transferred to Clemson
Mark Mitchell	25	F	6' 9"	232	Sophomore	Kansas City, KS	Transferred to Missouri
Kyle Filipowski	30	C	7' 0"	248	Sophomore	Westtown, NY	Drafted 32nd overall in the 2024 NBA draft

=== Incoming transfers ===
Incoming transfers
Name	Number	Pos.	Height	Weight	Year	Hometown	Previous school
Maliq Brown	6	F	6' 9"	222	Junior	Culpeper, VA	Syracuse
Cameron Sheffield	13	G/F	6' 6"	204	Senior	Alpharetta, GA	Rice
Sion James	14	G	6' 6"	220	Graduate student	Sugar Hill, GA	Tulane
Mason Gillis	18	F	6' 6"	225	Graduate student	New Castle, IN	Purdue

=== Recruiting class ===
==== 2024 recruiting class ====
College recruiting
Name	Hometown	School	Height	Weight	Commit date
Darren Harris #14 SF	Fairfax, VA	Paul VI Catholic	6 ft 6 in (1.98 m)	195 lb (88 kg)	Oct 22, 2022
Darren Harris #14 SF	Recruit ratings: Rivals: 247Sports: ESPN: (87)				
Isaiah Evans #3 SF	Huntersville, NC	North Mecklenburg	6 ft 6 in (1.98 m)	170 lb (77 kg)	Apr 27, 2023
Isaiah Evans #3 SF	Recruit ratings: Rivals: 247Sports: ESPN: (92)				
Kon Knueppel #5 SF	Milwaukee, WI	Wisconsin Lutheran	6 ft 5 in (1.96 m)	205 lb (93 kg)	Sep 21, 2023
Kon Knueppel #5 SF	Recruit ratings: Rivals: 247Sports: ESPN: (89)				
Cooper Flagg #1 PF	Newport, ME	Montverde Academy (FL)	6 ft 9 in (2.06 m)	195 lb (88 kg)	Oct 30, 2023
Cooper Flagg #1 PF	Recruit ratings: Rivals: 247Sports: ESPN: (97)				
Patrick Ngongba II #5 C	Fairfax, VA	Paul VI Catholic	6 ft 11 in (2.11 m)	235 lb (107 kg)	Nov 4, 2023
Patrick Ngongba II #5 C	Recruit ratings: Rivals: 247Sports: ESPN: (90)				
Khaman Maluach #1 C	Rumbek, South Sudan	NBA Academy Africa	7 ft 1 in (2.16 m)	250 lb (110 kg)	Mar 6, 2024
Khaman Maluach #1 C	Recruit ratings: Rivals: 247Sports: ESPN: (97)				
Overall recruit ranking:
Note: In many cases, Scout, Rivals, 247Sports, On3, and ESPN may conflict in their listings of height and weight.; In these cases, the average was taken. ESPN grades are on a 100-point scale.; Sources: "2024 Team Ranking". Rivals.

2024 overall class rankings

Website	National rank	Conference rank	5-star recruits	4-star recruits	Total
ESPN	--	--	0	0	0
On3 Recruits	0	0	--	0	0
Rivals	0	0	--	0	0
247 Sports	0	0	--	0	0

===== 2025 recruiting class =====
College recruiting
Name	Hometown	School	Height	Weight	Commit date
Cameron Boozer #1 Power forward	Salt Lake City, UT	Christopher Columbus (FL)	6 ft 9 in (2.06 m)	246 lb (112 kg)	Oct 11, 2024
Cameron Boozer #1 Power forward	Recruit ratings: Rivals: 247Sports: On3: ESPN: (98)				
Nikolas Khamenia #4 Power forward	Studio City, CA	Harvard-Westlake	6 ft 8 in (2.03 m)	215 lb (98 kg)	Oct 22, 2024
Nikolas Khamenia #4 Power forward	Recruit ratings: Rivals: 247Sports: On3: ESPN: (91)				
Cayden Boozer #4 Point guard	Salt Lake City, UT	Christopher Columbus (FL)	6 ft 4 in (1.93 m)	205 lb (93 kg)	Oct 11, 2024
Cayden Boozer #4 Point guard	Recruit ratings: Rivals: 247Sports: On3: ESPN: (90)				
Sebastian Wilkins* #5 Power forward	Canton, MA	Brewster Academy (NH)	6 ft 8 in (2.03 m)	210 lb (95 kg)	May 23, 2025
Sebastian Wilkins* #5 Power forward	Recruit ratings: Rivals: 247Sports: On3: ESPN: (89)				
Dame Sarr; Small forward	Oderzo, Italy	FC Barcelona Bàsquet (ESP)	6 ft 6 in (1.98 m)	181 lb (82 kg)	May 22, 2025
Dame Sarr; Small forward	Recruit ratings: 247Sports: On3: (NR)				
Overall recruit ranking: Rivals: 3 247Sports: 1 On3: 2 ESPN: 1
Note: In many cases, Scout, Rivals, 247Sports, On3, and ESPN may conflict in their listings of height and weight.; In these cases, the average was taken. ESPN grades are on a 100-point scale.; Sources: "Duke 2025 Basketball Commitments". Rivals.; "2025 Duke Blue Devils Recruiting Class". ESPN.; "2025 Team Ranking". Rivals.; "2025 Duke 24/7 Sports Commits". 247Sports.; "2025 Duke Blue Devils Basketball Industry Comparison Commits". On3.

- Wilkins reclassified from the class of 2026 to 2025 in committing.

2025 overall class rankings

Website	National rank	Conference rank	5-star recruits	4-star recruits	Total
ESPN	1	1	3	1	4
On3 Recruits	1	1	1	3	5
Rivals	3	1	1	2	4
247 Sports	1	1	3	2	6

== Roster ==
2024–25 Duke Blue Devils men's basketball team
Players
Coaches

Pos.	#	Name	Height	Weight	Year	Previous school	Hometown
G	1	Caleb Foster	6 ft 5 in (1.96 m)	202 lb (92 kg)	So	Notre Dame (Calif.)	Harrisburg, North Carolina
G/F	2	Cooper Flagg	6 ft 9 in (2.06 m)	205 lb (93 kg)	Fr	Montverde Academy (FL)	Newport, Maine
G/F	3	Isaiah Evans	6 ft 6 in (1.98 m)	175 lb (79 kg)	Fr	North Mecklenburg HS	Fayetteville, North Carolina
G	5	Tyrese Proctor	6 ft 6 in (1.98 m)	183 lb (83 kg)	Jr	NBA Global Academy	Sydney, NSW, Australia
F	6	Maliq Brown	6 ft 9 in (2.06 m)	222 lb (101 kg)	Jr	Blue Ridge	Culpeper, Virginia
G/F	7	Kon Knueppel	6 ft 7 in (2.01 m)	217 lb (98 kg)	Fr	Wisconsin Lutheran	Milwaukee, Wisconsin
G/F	8	Darren Harris	6 ft 6 in (1.98 m)	203 lb (92 kg)	Fr	Paul VI HS	Herndon, Virginia
C	9	Khaman Maluach	7 ft 2 in (2.18 m)	250 lb (113 kg)	Fr	NBA Academy Africa	Rumbek, Lakes, South Sudan
G/F	13	Cameron Sheffield	6 ft 6 in (1.98 m)	204 lb (93 kg)	GS	Chattahoochee	Alpharetta, Georgia
G	14	Sion James	6 ft 6 in (1.98 m)	220 lb (100 kg)	GS	Lanier HS	Sugar Hill, Georgia
F	18	Mason Gillis	6 ft 6 in (1.98 m)	225 lb (102 kg)	GS	New Castle HS	New Castle, Indiana
F	20	Neal Begovich	6 ft 9 in (2.06 m)	230 lb (104 kg)	GS	St. Ignatius Prep.	San Francisco, California
C	21	Patrick Ngongba II	6 ft 11 in (2.11 m)	250 lb (113 kg)	Fr	Paul VI HS	Manassas, Virginia
C	52	Stanley Borden (W)	7 ft 0 in (2.13 m)	241 lb (109 kg)	Sr	IICS (Turkey)	Istanbul, Turkey
G	55	Spencer Hubbard	5 ft 8 in (1.73 m)	157 lb (71 kg)	GS	Harvard-Westlake	Los Angeles, California

Head coach

Jon Scheyer

Assistant coach(es)

Chris Carrawell
Jai Lucas*
Will Avery
Emanuel Dildy

Legend

- (C) Team captain
- (S) Suspended
- (I) Ineligible
- (W) Walk-on
- Injured
- Current redshirt

Roster
Last update: 2025-03-27

*Lucas' final game as Duke assistant coach was the March 8, 2025 regular-season finale against North Carolina. Lucas then left the program to become the head men's basketball coach at the University of Miami.

=== Depth chart ===
Pos.	Starting 5	Bench 1	Bench 2
C	Khaman Maluach	Patrick Ngongba II	Stanley Borden
PF	Cooper Flagg	Maliq Brown	Neal Begovich
SF	Kon Knueppel	Mason Gillis	Cameron Sheffield
SG	Sion James	Isaiah Evans	Darren Harris
PG	Tyrese Proctor	Caleb Foster	Spencer Hubbard

== Schedule and results ==
Date time, TV	Rank^{#}	Opponent^{#}	Result	Record	High points	High rebounds	High assists	Site (attendance) city, state
Exhibition
October 19, 2024*; 1:00 p.m., ACCNX/ESPN+	No. 7	Lincoln	W 107–56	–	22 – Flagg	11 – Maluach	6 – Flagg	Cameron Indoor Stadium (9,314); Durham, NC
October 27, 2024*; 7:00 p.m., ACCN	No. 7	Arizona State; Brotherhood Run charity game	W 103–47	–	19 – Knueppel	12 – Maluach	4 – Tied	Cameron Indoor Stadium (9,314); Durham, NC
Regular season
November 4, 2024*; 7:00 p.m., ACCN	No. 7	Maine	W 96–62	1–0	22 – Knueppel	7 – Tied	5 – Flagg	Cameron Indoor Stadium (9,314); Durham, NC
November 8, 2024*; 6:00 p.m., ACCN	No. 7	Army	W 100–58	2–0	15 – Knueppel	14 – Maluach	4 – James	Cameron Indoor Stadium (9,314); Durham, NC
November 12, 2024*; 9:00 p.m., ESPN	No. 6	vs. No. 19 Kentucky; Champions Classic	L 72–77	2–1	26 – Flagg	12 – Flagg	4 – Foster	State Farm Arena (16,107); Atlanta, GA
November 16, 2024*; 12:00 p.m, ACCN	No. 6	Wofford	W 86–35	3–1	15 – Proctor	9 – Flagg	6 – Flagg	Cameron Indoor Stadium (9,314); Durham, NC
November 22, 2024*; 10:30 p.m., ESPN2	No. 12	at No. 17 Arizona	W 69–55	4–1	24 – Flagg	7 – Tied	4 – Proctor	McKale Center (14,634); Tucson, Arizona
November 26, 2024*; 9:00 p.m., ESPN	No. 11	vs. No. 1 Kansas; Vegas Showdown	L 72–75	4–2	15 – Proctor	6 – Proctor	8 – Knueppel	T-Mobile Arena (14,757); Paradise, NV
November 29, 2024*; 7:00 p.m., ACCN	No. 11	Seattle; Vegas Showdown campus game	W 70–48	5–2	13 – Proctor	9 – Flagg	7 – Flagg	Cameron Indoor Stadium (9,314); Durham, NC
December 4, 2024*; 9:15 p.m., ESPN	No. 9	No. 2 Auburn; ACC–SEC Challenge	W 84–78	6–2	22 – Flagg	11 – Flagg	4 – Flagg	Cameron Indoor Stadium (9,314); Durham, NC
December 8, 2024; 6:00 p.m., ACCN	No. 9	at Louisville	W 76–65	7–2 (1–0)	20 – Flagg	12 – Flagg	6 – Knueppel	KFC Yum! Center (15,312); Louisville, KY
December 10, 2024*; 7:00 p.m., ACCN	No. 4	Incarnate Word	W 72–46	8–2	17 – Maluach	8 – Tied	5 – Gillis	Cameron Indoor Stadium (9,314); Durham, NC
December 17, 2024*; 7:00 p.m., ACCN	No. 5	George Mason	W 68–47	9–2	24 – Flagg	9 – Flagg	4 – Flagg	Cameron Indoor Stadium (9,314); Durham, NC
December 21, 2024; 12:00 p.m., ACCN	No. 5	at Georgia Tech	W 82–56	10–2 (2–0)	18 – Knueppel	8 – Maluach	5 – Knueppel	McCamish Pavilion (8,005); Atlanta, GA
December 31, 2024; 4:30 p.m., ACCN	No. 4	Virginia Tech	W 88–65	11–2 (3–0)	24 – Flagg	11 – James	6 – Flagg	Cameron Indoor Stadium (9,314); Durham, NC
January 4, 2025; 2:15 p.m., The CW	No. 4	at SMU	W 89–62	12–2 (4–0)	24 – Flagg	11 – Flagg	8 – James	Moody Coliseum (7,105); Dallas, TX
January 7, 2025; 7:00 p.m., ESPN	No. 4	Pittsburgh	W 76–47	13–2 (5–0)	19 – Flagg	10 – Flagg	5 – Flagg	Cameron Indoor Stadium (9,314); Durham, NC
January 11, 2025; 12:00 p.m., ESPN	No. 4	Notre Dame	W 86–78	14–2 (6–0)	42 – Flagg	10 – Maluach	7 – Flagg	Cameron Indoor Stadium (9,314); Durham, NC
January 14, 2025; 9:00 p.m., ESPN	No. 3	Miami (FL)	W 89–54	15–2 (7–0)	25 – Knueppel	15 – Maluach	6 – Flagg	Cameron Indoor Stadium (9,314); Durham, NC
January 18, 2025; 8:00 p.m., ESPN	No. 3	at Boston College	W 88–63	16–2 (8–0)	28 – Flagg	7 – James	6 – James	Conte Forum (8,606); Chestnut Hill, MA
January 25, 2025; 4:30 p.m., ESPN	No. 2	at Wake Forest	W 63–56	17–2 (9–0)	24 – Flagg	9 – Knueppel	6 – Flagg	LJVM Coliseum (13,169); Winston-Salem, NC
January 27, 2025; 8:30 p.m., ESPN	No. 2	NC State	W 74–64	18–2 (10–0)	28 – Flagg	8 – Maluach	3 – Tied	Cameron Indoor Stadium (9,314); Durham, NC
February 1, 2025; 6:30 p.m., ESPN	No. 2	North Carolina; Rivalry/College GameDay	W 87–70	19–2 (11–0)	22 – Knueppel	8 – Flagg	7 – Flagg	Cameron Indoor Stadium (9,314); Durham, NC
February 5, 2025; 7:00 p.m., ESPN2	No. 2	at Syracuse	W 83–54	20–2 (12–0)	16 – Proctor	8 – Brown	4 – Tied	JMA Wireless Dome (23,313); Syracuse, NY
February 8, 2025; 6:30 p.m., ESPN	No. 2	at Clemson	L 71–77	20–3 (12–1)	23 – Proctor	5 – Tied	5 – James	Littlejohn Coliseum (9,000); Clemson, SC
February 12, 2025; 9:00 p.m., ACCN	No. 3т	California	W 78–57	21–3 (13–1)	27 – Flagg	12 – Maluach	3 – Tied	Cameron Indoor Stadium (9,314); Durham, NC
February 15, 2025; 4:00 p.m., ABC	No. 3т	Stanford	W 106–70	22–3 (14–1)	23 – Proctor	6 – Maluach	6 – Tied	Cameron Indoor Stadium (9,314); Durham, NC
February 17, 2025; 8:00 p.m., ESPN	No. 3	at Virginia	W 80–62	23–3 (15–1)	17 – Tied	14 – Flagg	4 – Proctor	John Paul Jones Arena (14,445); Charlottesville, VA
February 22, 2025*; 8:00 p.m., FOX	No. 3	vs. Illinois; SentinelOne Classic	W 110–67	24–3	17 – Evans	7 – Tied	6 – James	Madison Square Garden (19,812); New York, NY
February 25, 2025; 7:00 p.m., ESPN	No. 2	at Miami (FL)	W 97–60	25–3 (16–1)	20 – Knueppel	5 – Tied	6 – Flagg	Watsco Center (7,801); Coral Gables, FL
March 1, 2025; 7:00 p.m., ACCN	No. 2	Florida State	W 100–65	26–3 (17–1)	19 – Evans	10 – Maluach	5 – Knueppel	Cameron Indoor Stadium (9,314); Durham, NC
March 3, 2025; 7:00 p.m., ESPN	No. 2	Wake Forest	W 93–60	27–3 (18–1)	28 – Flagg	14 – Maluach	7 – Flagg	Cameron Indoor Stadium (9,314); Durham, NC
March 8, 2025; 6:30 p.m., ESPN	No. 2	at North Carolina; Rivalry/College GameDay	W 82–69	28–3 (19–1)	17 – Knueppel	9 – Tied	6 – Flagg	Dean Smith Center (21,750); Chapel Hill, NC
ACC tournament
March 13, 2025; 12:00 p.m., ESPN	(1) No. 1	vs. (8) Georgia Tech; Quarterfinals	W 78–70	29–3	28 – Knueppel	9 – Maluach	8 – Knueppel	Spectrum Center (14,116); Charlotte, NC
March 14, 2025; 7:00 p.m., ESPN	(1) No. 1	vs. (5) North Carolina; Semifinals/Rivalry	W 74–71	30–3	17 – Knueppel	9 – Maluach	3 – Knueppel	Spectrum Center (18,116); Charlotte, NC
March 15, 2025; 8:30 p.m., ESPN	(1) No. 1	vs. (2) No. 13 Louisville; Final	W 73–62	31–3	19 – Proctor	10 – Maluach	3 – Tied	Spectrum Center (15,322); Charlotte, NC
NCAA tournament
March 21, 2025; 2:50 p.m., CBS	(1 E) No. 1	vs. (16 E) Mount St. Mary's; First Round	W 93–49	32–3	19 – Proctor	8 – Ngongba	5 – Proctor	Lenovo Center (19,180); Raleigh, NC
March 23, 2025; 2:40 p.m., CBS	(1 E) No. 1	vs. (9 E) Baylor; Second Round	W 89–66	33–3	25 – Proctor	9 – Flagg	6 – Flagg	Lenovo Center (19,244); Raleigh, NC
March 27, 2025; 9:39 p.m., CBS	(1 E) No. 1	vs. (4 E) No. 21 Arizona; Sweet Sixteen	W 100–93	34–3	30 – Flagg	6 – Tied	7 – Flagg	Prudential Center (18,617); Newark, NJ
March 29, 2025; 8:49 p.m., TBS/truTV	(1 E) No. 1	vs. (2 E) No. 7 Alabama; Elite Eight	W 85–65	35–3	21 – Knueppel	9 – Tied	5 – Knueppel	Prudential Center (18,793); Newark, NJ
April 5, 2025; 8:49 p.m., CBS	(1 E) No. 1	vs. (1 MW) No. 2 Houston; Final Four	L 67–70	35–4	27 – Flagg	7 – Tied	4 – Flagg	Alamodome (68,252); San Antonio, TX
*Non-conference game. ^{#}Rankings from AP poll. (#) Tournament seedings in parentheses. E=East. MW=Midwest. All times are in Eastern.

== Rankings ==
Ranking movements Legend: ██ Increase in ranking ██ Decrease in ranking т = Tied with team above or below ( ) = First-place votes
	Week																				
Poll	Pre	1	2	3	4	5	6	7	8	9	10	11	12	13	14	15	16	17	18	19	Final
AP	7	6	12	11	9	4	5	4	4	4	3 (1)	2	2	2	3т	3	2	2	1 (52)	1 (49)	3
Coaches	5	6	10	10	9	6	5	4	4	4	3	2	2	2 (2)	5	3	2 (2)	2 (1)	1 (26)	1 (25)	3
