= Champions Classic =

College basketball event

- Sport: College basketball
- Founded: 2011
- No. of teams: 4
- Venue: Varies
- Broadcaster: ESPN
- Sponsor: State Farm
- Website: https://espnevents.com/champions-classic

The Champions Classic is an event held near the beginning of the NCAA Division I men's basketball season. It features four of the top college basketball programs in the United States: Duke, Kansas, Kentucky, and Michigan State. The venue changes from year to year, with Madison Square Garden being the first venue. The first Classic was held on November 15, 2011. This would be the beginning of a three-year rotation, originally scheduled to end in 2013, where each of the teams would play each other once. The event is televised on ESPN. The series is set to run through 2028.

The series was started as an early-season match-up of four of the nation's best and most consistent basketball programs as evidenced by the fact that three of the four teams have been ranked for every competition; Michigan State being the exception to that rule by being unranked in 2011, 2021, 2022 and 2024. Only ten of the games played in the classic have been won by 10 or more points. Three of the four teams from the 2014 event advanced to the 2015 Final Four (Duke, Kentucky, and Michigan State) with Duke winning the National Championship that year. The 2019 games featured the schools ranked first, second, third, and fourth in both the AP and Coaches polls. From 2017 to 2021, all four teams were coached by members of the Naismith Memorial Basketball Hall of Fame; Bill Self of Kansas was the last of the four coaches inducted in 2017, Mike Krzyzewski retired at the end of the 2021–22 season.

As of the conclusion of the 2026 games, Kansas has the best record at 10-6, followed by Duke at 9-7, Michigan State at 7-9 and Kentucky at 6-10. Each team has at least one victory over each team in the classic. Kansas has a winning record vs each of the other three teams and Kentucky has a losing record vs each of the other three teams. Only once has a game gone into overtime, in 2022 when Michigan State defeated Kentucky. The most points scored was 118 by Duke in 2018, while the fewest was 40 by Kansas in 2014. The largest margin of defeat was 34 points when Duke defeated Kentucky 118–84 in 2018. The closest game was a Kansas victory over Duke by 2 points (77–75) in 2016.

== Game results ==
Rankings are based on the Associated Press poll.

Date	Location	Winning team		Losing team		Attendance
November 15, 2011	Madison Square Garden (New York, NY)	No. 6 Duke	74	Michigan State	69	19,979
November 15, 2011	Madison Square Garden (New York, NY)	No. 2 Kentucky	75	No. 12 Kansas	65	19,979
November 13, 2012	Georgia Dome (Atlanta, GA)	No. 21 Michigan State	67	No. 7 Kansas	64	22,847
November 13, 2012	Georgia Dome (Atlanta, GA)	No. 9 Duke	75	No. 3 Kentucky	68	22,847
November 12, 2013	United Center (Chicago, IL)	No. 2 Michigan State	78	No. 1 Kentucky	74	22,711
November 12, 2013	United Center (Chicago, IL)	No. 5 Kansas	94	No. 4 Duke	83	22,711
November 18, 2014	Bankers Life Fieldhouse (Indianapolis, IN)	No. 4 Duke	81	No. 19 Michigan State	71	19,306
November 18, 2014	Bankers Life Fieldhouse (Indianapolis, IN)	No. 1 Kentucky	72	No. 5 Kansas	40	19,306
November 17, 2015	United Center (Chicago, IL)	No. 2 Kentucky	74	No. 5 Duke	63	21,461
November 17, 2015	United Center (Chicago, IL)	No. 13 Michigan State	79	No. 4 Kansas	73	21,461
November 15, 2016	Madison Square Garden (New York, NY)	No. 2 Kentucky	69	No. 13 Michigan State	48	19,812
November 15, 2016	Madison Square Garden (New York, NY)	No. 7 Kansas	77	No. 1 Duke	75	19,812
November 14, 2017	United Center (Chicago, IL)	No. 1 Duke	88	No. 2 Michigan State	81	21,684
November 14, 2017	United Center (Chicago, IL)	No. 4 Kansas	65	No. 7 Kentucky	61	21,684
November 6, 2018	Bankers Life Fieldhouse (Indianapolis, IN)	No. 1 Kansas	92	No. 10 Michigan State	87	19,584
November 6, 2018	Bankers Life Fieldhouse (Indianapolis, IN)	No. 4 Duke	118	No. 2 Kentucky	84	19,584
November 5, 2019	Madison Square Garden (New York, NY)	No. 4 Duke	68	No. 3 Kansas	66	19,812
November 5, 2019	Madison Square Garden (New York, NY)	No. 2 Kentucky	69	No. 1 Michigan State	62	19,812
December 1, 2020	Cameron Indoor Stadium^{a} (Durham, NC)	No. 8 Michigan State	75	No. 6 Duke	69	0^{b}
December 1, 2020	Bankers Life Fieldhouse^{a} (Indianapolis, IN)	No. 7 Kansas	65	No. 20 Kentucky	62	0^{b}
November 9, 2021	Madison Square Garden (New York, NY)	No. 3 Kansas	87	Michigan State	74	18,132
November 9, 2021	Madison Square Garden (New York, NY)	No. 9 Duke	79	No. 10 Kentucky	71	18,132
November 15, 2022	Gainbridge Fieldhouse (Indianapolis, IN)	No. 6 Kansas	69	No. 7 Duke	64	17,923
November 15, 2022	Gainbridge Fieldhouse (Indianapolis, IN)	Michigan State	86^{2OT}	No. 4 Kentucky	77	17,923
November 14, 2023	United Center (Chicago, IL)	No. 9 Duke	74	No. 18 Michigan State	65	18,780
November 14, 2023	United Center (Chicago, IL)	No. 1 Kansas	89	No. 17 Kentucky	84	18,780
November 12, 2024	State Farm Arena (Atlanta, GA)	No. 1 Kansas	77	Michigan State	69	16,107
November 12, 2024	State Farm Arena (Atlanta, GA)	No. 19 Kentucky	77	No. 6 Duke	72	16,107
November 18, 2025	Madison Square Garden (New York, NY)	No. 17 Michigan State	83	No. 12 Kentucky	66	19,327
November 18, 2025	Madison Square Garden (New York, NY)	No. 5 Duke	78	No. 24 Kansas	66	19,327
November 10, 2026	United Center (Chicago, IL)	No. 5 Michigan State	79	No. 2 Duke	73	18,891
November 10, 2026	United Center (Chicago, IL)	No. 15 Kansas	89	No. 24 Kentucky	69	18,891

- ^{a} Due to the COVID-19 pandemic and conflicting safety protocols between the various conferences, Michigan State played its Champions Classic game at Duke while Kentucky and Kansas played in Indianapolis.
- ^{b} No attendance due to COVID-19 pandemic.

== Future match-ups ==
Date	Location	Match-ups
2027	TBA	Kentucky vs. Duke; Kansas vs. Michigan State
2028	TBA	Kentucky vs. Michigan State; Duke vs. Kansas

== Head-to-head records ==
	Duke	Kansas	Kentucky	Michigan State
vs. Duke	–	3–2	2–3	2–4
vs. Kansas	2–3	–	2–4	2–3
vs. Kentucky	3–2	4–2	–	3–2
vs. Michigan State	4–2	3–2	2–3	–
Total	9–7	10–6	6–10	7–9
