= Jon Scheyer =

American-Israeli basketball player and coach (born 1987)

- Scheyer in 2026

Duke Blue Devils
- Title: Head coach
- League: Atlantic Coast Conference

Personal information
- Born: August 24, 1987 (age 39) Northbrook, Illinois, U.S.
- Listed height: 6 ft 5 in (1.96 m)
- Listed weight: 187 lb (85 kg)

Career information
- High school: Glenbrook North (Northbrook, Illinois)
- College: Duke (2006–2010)
- NBA draft: 2010: undrafted
- Playing career: 2011–2013
- Position: Shooting guard / point guard
- Number: 30
- Coaching career: 2014–present

Career history

Playing
- 2011: Rio Grande Valley Vipers
- 2011–2012: Maccabi Tel Aviv
- 2012–2013: Gran Canaria

Coaching
- 2014–2018: Duke (assistant)
- 2018–2022: Duke (associate HC)
- 2022–present: Duke

Career highlights
- As player: Israeli Cup champion (2012); Israeli League Cup champion (2012); NCAA champion (2010); Consensus second-team All-American (2010); First-team All-ACC (2010); ACC All-Freshman team (2007); ACC tournament MVP (2009); McDonald's All-American (2006); First-team Parade All-American (2006); Fourth-team Parade All-American (2005); Illinois Mr. Basketball (2006); As assistant coach: NCAA champion (2015); As head coach: NCAA Division I regional champion – Final Four (2025); 3× ACC tournament champion (2023, 2025, 2026); 2× ACC regular season champion (2025, 2026); NABC Coach of the Year (2026); ACC Coach of the Year (2026)
- Stats at Basketball Reference

Jonathan James Scheyer (/ˈʃaɪ.ər/ SHY-ər, born August 24, 1987) is an American born college basketball coach and former player who is the head coach for the Duke Blue Devils of the Atlantic Coast Conference (ACC).

As a player, Scheyer led his high school team to an Illinois state basketball championship as a high school All-American, and was the captain of the 2009–10 Duke Blue Devils that won the 2010 NCAA Basketball Championship, as a college All-American. He was a prolific high school scorer, and later an Atlantic Coast Conference (ACC) leader in numerous statistical categories, including free-throw percentage, three-point shots/game, and assists/turnover ratio.

The fourth leading scorer in Illinois high school history, he led his team to a state championship in 2005, and was named Illinois Mr. Basketball in 2006. During the same year, Scheyer was voted as one of the 100 Legends of the IHSA Boys Basketball Tournament, a group of former players and coaches in honor of the 100th anniversary of the IHSA boys basketball tournament.

He chose to attend Duke for college, where he moved from shooting guard to point guard toward the end of the 2008–09 season, and was the Most Valuable Player of the 2009 ACC men's basketball tournament. In his senior year in 2009–10 as Duke's captain, he led the team to ACC regular season and tournament championships and the NCAA national championship. He led the championship team in points per game, assists, free-throw percentage, and steals per game. Scheyer was a 2010 consensus All-American (Second Team), a unanimous 2009–10 All-ACC First Team selection, and named to the 2010 ACC All-Tournament First Team.

== Early life ==
Scheyer was born in Northbrook, Illinois, and is the youngest of three children of Laury and Jim Scheyer. He was raised in his father's Jewish religion, and had a Bar Mitzvah. He began dribbling a basketball at age three and played in his first AAU national tournament six years later. As a youth, he played in a league called the Fellowship of Afro-American Men (FAAM), in Evanston, Illinois. He received a scholarship offer from Marquette University's Tom Crean as an eighth-grader.

== High school career ==
Because Scheyer's talent was obvious by the time he was set to start high school, many people encouraged his parents to move so he could attend a high school with a powerhouse basketball program. The move was recommended so that he would have a greater chance of success. Scheyer shrugged off the suggestion.

Scheyer attended Glenbrook North High School and led the Spartans to an Illinois High School Association Class AA state basketball championship as a junior, a 3rd-place finish in 2003 as a freshman, and an Elite Eight appearance in the state playoffs three out of four years from 2003 to 2006. Scheyer was known as the "Jewish Jordan", and the Spartans' state championship team is the only high school state championship basketball squad in the nation known to have included an all-Jewish starting line-up.

As a freshman, Scheyer led Glenbrook North in scoring and assists and was First Team All-State as a sophomore in 2004. Scheyer was the only non-senior among those First Team All-State selections and was the only underclassman on any of the first three All-State squads. As a junior, he averaged 26 points, five rebounds, and five assists. His coach David Weber said, "I call him a combination of Larry Bird and 'Pistol' Pete (Maravich). He's got the flair, the passing abilities. He's got good size. He's a rare player in this day and age." Scheyer rose to national fame in his senior year by scoring 21 points in 75 seconds of play during a one-man comeback effort in the last minute and a half of a high school game against Proviso West High School, in an effort to keep alive his team's 35-game winning streak. It has been called one of the best performances ever on a high school court. As a senior, Scheyer averaged 32 points, six rebounds, five assists, and three steals.

One example of his dogged pursuit of excellence is that while in high school, Scheyer refused to leave the gym one night until he made 50 consecutive free throws. After finally hitting 49 in a row, he missed on his final attempt. His father encouraged him to join him and go home, but – as his coach recalled – "Jon looked at him and said, 'No. I'm starting over.' Then he stayed until he made 50 in a row."

Scheyer is the fourth-leading scorer in Illinois history with 3,034 points, and he is the only player in state history to finish his career ranked in the all-time top 10 in points (4th), rebounds, assists (6th), and steals (7th). He was named Illinois Mr. Basketball in 2006 by an overwhelming margin (receiving 217 votes, to 17 for the second-place finisher), a high school All-American, a two-time Gatorade state Player of the Year, and a three-time All-State selection. He had a reputation as an exceptional 3-point shooter, a good defensive rebounder, and a big-game performer. In naming him to the Illinois First-Team for the decade, ESPN wrote that he was "one of the greatest Illinois high school players of all-time". He was also named to the century-list, the "100 Legends of Illinois Basketball (1908–2007)". Illinois Warriors coach Larry Butler said: "Jon Scheyer is one of the most prolific scorers I've seen in Illinois high school basketball. He was just the ultimate team player. Jon Scheyer would take the shirt off his back to win a game." A Chicago Sun-Times article observed:

Scheyer's offensive game is amazing ... He hits jumpers from all manner of pogo-stick angles. He can hit runners while shooting back across his body. He can drive and finish in acrobatic ways. His offensive repertoire of ways to score is like a magician's bag of tricks. Offensively, he is a modern-day 'Pistol' Pete Maravich.

Scheyer was a 2006 Inductee into the National Jewish Sports Hall of Fame.

College recruiting
Name	Hometown	School	Height	Weight	Commit date
Jon Scheyer; SG	Northbrook, IL	Glenbrook North (IL)	6 ft 4.5 in (1.94 m)	175 lb (79 kg)	May 18, 2005
Jon Scheyer; SG	Recruit ratings: Scout: Rivals:				
Overall recruit ranking: Scout: 3 (SG) Rivals: 71, 15 (SG)
Note: In many cases, Scout, Rivals, 247Sports, On3, and ESPN may conflict in their listings of height and weight.; In these cases, the average was taken. ESPN grades are on a 100-point scale.; Sources: "Duke Basketball Commitments". Rivals.; "2006 Duke Basketball Commits". Scout.; "ESPN". ESPN.; "Scout.com Team Recruiting Rankings". Scout.; "2006 Team Ranking". Rivals.

== College career ==
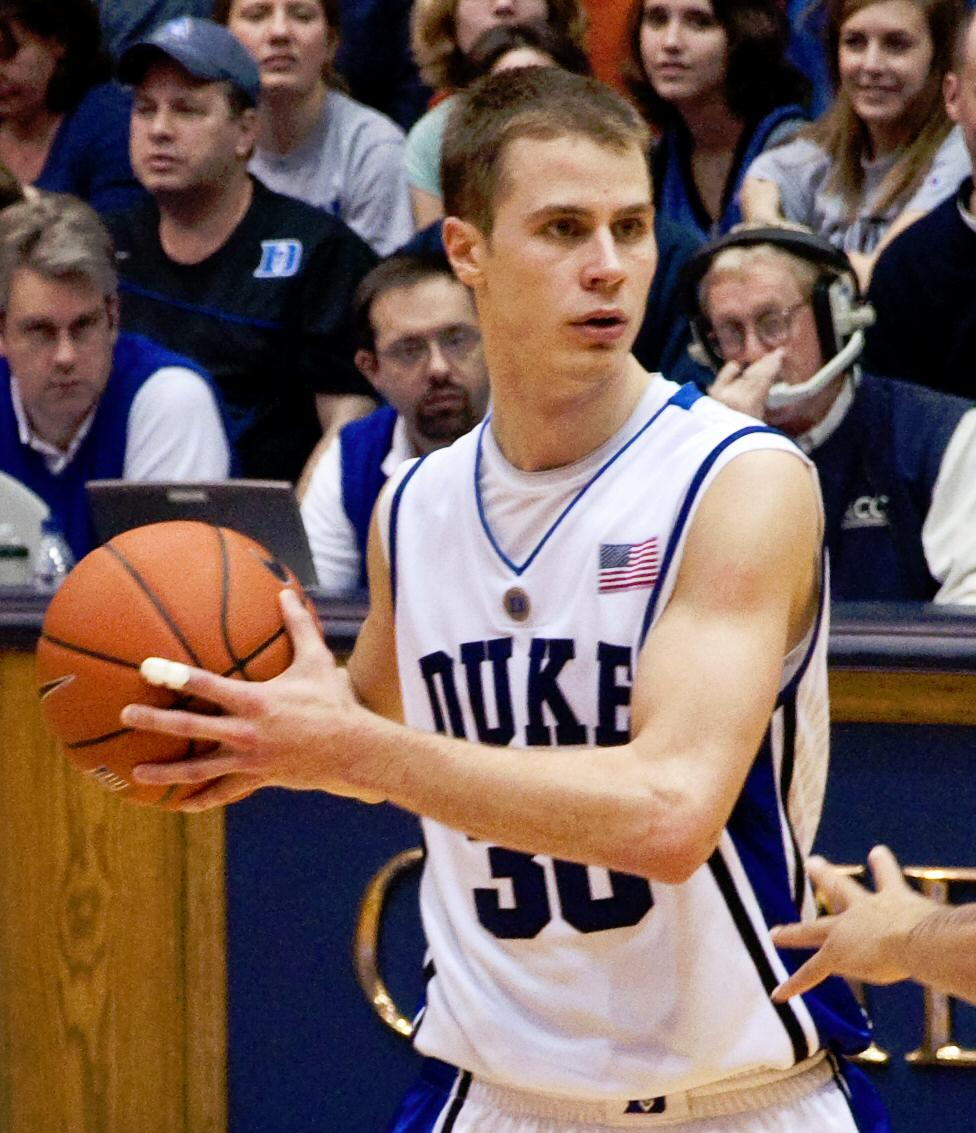
Scheyer in 2010.

Scheyer's final four college choices were Arizona, Duke, Illinois, and Wisconsin. On the one hand, his connection with Illinois was strengthened by the fact that his high school coach was Illinois coach Bruce Weber's brother. In addition, when he had been in junior high school, he had really disliked Duke's team, because all his friends liked Duke and he wanted to be different. Working in favor of Duke, however, was the fact that its assistant coach Chris Collins had also attended Glenbrook North. He also believed that playing for the Blue Devils provided him with the best chance of playing in the Final Four. He ultimately chose to attend Duke, where he majored in history.

=== Freshman season (2006–2007) ===
In the 2006–07 season he started all 33 Blue Devils games as a freshman, and scored a season-high 26 points in a loss to North Carolina on February 7, 2007. He led all freshmen in the ACC with an .846 free throw percentage, and was eighth in the ACC in minutes per game (33.7). He was an ACC All-Freshman Team selection, and was named "ACC Rookie of the Week" three times. He tied for second on the team with 39 steals, and averaged 12.2 points per game (third-best on the team). He also tied the Duke freshman record by making 115 free throws, and holds the third-longest streak for consecutive free throws made in Duke history at 40. Though not naturally a point guard, Scheyer spent some time playing the point due to lack of depth at that position. "It was a learning experience," Scheyer said. "It made me more confident bringing the ball up the court."

=== Sophomore season (2007–2008) ===
Despite the fact that he was a starter as a freshman, Coach Mike Krzyzewski (Coach K) chose to start Gerald Henderson, Jr., in Scheyer's place for the majority of the season. Scheyer started only once during his sophomore year, but played in all 34 games. On December 20, 2007, he grabbed a career-high 12 rebounds against Pittsburgh. He scored 27 points at Miami on February 20, 2008, matching the most points by a player off the bench in Duke history. His free throw percentage (.889) was 2nd in the ACC for the season, 12th in the nation, and 5th-best in school history. He had a team-best 2.24:1 assist-to-turnover ratio, averaged the third-most minutes-per-game on the team (28.3), was fourth in scoring (11.7), and was widely hailed as one of the country's top sixth men. He averaged 3.9 rebounds, 2.4 assists, and 1.4 steals per game.

=== Junior season (2008–2009) ===
Scheyer was named one of three captains for the Blue Devils for the 2008–09 season. He scored a then-career-high 30 points against Wake Forest on February 22, 2009. On February 19, Scheyer was moved from shooting guard, where he had played 91 games, to point guard; there he played well for the last 9 games of the season and into the post-season. As a point guard, he averaged 19.7 points and 2.5 assists per game, and committed 1 turnover a game. Florida State Seminoles men's basketball coach Leonard Hamilton said he thought Scheyer had a "calming" influence on the team's offense.

Scheyer was 7th in the ACC in free throw percentage (.841) for the season, 8th in minutes per game (32.8), tied for 8th in steals per game (1.6) and three-point field goals made per game (2.1), and 18th in points per game (14.9). In the team's 36 games, Scheyer led the Blue Devils in minutes, free throws, free throw percentage, 3-point field goals, 3-point field goal percentage (.395), assists, and assists per game (2.8). He was named the MVP of the 2009 ACC Tournament after scoring 29 points in the championship game. Krzyzewski said after the season: "He's a great competitor. He handles the ball real well. He scores—he scored more when he was bringing the ball up than when he didn't bring the ball up. I think the more the ball is in Jon's hands, the better." Reflecting his off-the-court accomplishments, Scheyer was a 2009 ACC Academic Honor Roll selection.

=== Senior season (2009–2010) ===
College Career
Year	G	PPG	RPG	APG	FG%	FT%	3P%
2006–07	33	12.2	3.3	1.8	39.8	84.6	36.3
2007–08	34	11.7	3.9	2.4	44.4	88.9	38.8
2008–09	37	14.9	3.6	2.8	39.7	83.6	38.5
2009–10	40	18.2	3.6	4.9	39.9	87.8	38.3

Scheyer was again named captain along with Lance Thomas. Commenting on his play, Coach Krzyzewski said: "He understands, which most kids, believe me, do not, the value of the ball. He makes really good decisions with the ball, whether it's a pass, a shot, or the time on the clock." And: "Some of the plays he makes—you might not think he's that fast, but he has great body control." On December 2, 2009, he became the first Duke player to record 1,400 points, 400 rebounds, 250 assists, 200 3-point field goals, and 150 steals for a career. On December 16, he scored 24 of a career-high 36 points in the first half to lead Duke past Gardner-Webb. He shot 11-of-13 and hit a career-best seven 3-pointers while grabbing eight rebounds and getting nine assists.

Scheyer made a 3-pointer with 18 seconds left to seal a win for Duke over Georgia Tech for the ACC championship on March 14, 2010.

With 2:37 remaining, Scheyer hit a 3-pointer to put Duke ahead 67–61. The Blue Devils won as he finished with 20 points, 5 rebounds, and 4 assists. In Duke's Final Four win over West Virginia, he led the team with 23 points while shooting 5 for 9 from 3-point range, with 6 assists, no turnovers, and 2 steals.

Duke won the national championship with a 61–59 victory over Butler, as Scheyer scored 5 of the team's last 10 points. Scheyer had 15 points in the win, and led the team with 5 assists. He became the second player to win an Illinois high school state championship and an NCAA Division I championship, the other having been Quinn Buckner, who won state titles at Thornridge High School in 1971 and 1972, and then was a champion with Indiana in 1976. Sports Illustrated featured Scheyer on the cover of their April 12, 2010, issue.

Scheyer signed with Mark Bartelstein of Priority Sports prior to the NBA draft. Scheyer missed the NBA Draft Combine in late May and lost 10 pounds as he battled mononucleosis, which had him out for approximately three weeks and also forced him to miss his graduation. In June, he participated in pre-draft workouts for ten teams. Scheyer went undrafted in the 2010 NBA draft.

==== Records and statistics ====
Scheyer set the ACC all-time single-season record for minutes played in 2009–10 (with 1,470, passing Dennis Scott). Scheyer said: "I feel as though this is what I've prepared my whole life to do. There's never a time in a game when I feel I'm winded." In the 2009–10 season, he also led the ACC in assist/turnover ratio (3.0; 2nd-best in Duke history to Steve Wojciechowski in 1997), free throw percentage (.878; 7th-best in Duke history), and 3-point FGs made (2.8 per game). He also tied for 2nd in games with 20 or more points (17), and was 3rd in scoring (18.2 points per game), 4th in assists (4.9 per game) and 3-point FG percentage (.383), and 7th in steals (1.6 per game).

For the season, he has also led the nation in assist/turnover ratio. He had 38 double-figure scoring games in the single season (tied for 3rd-most in Duke history with Elton Brand), 110 3-point field goals (the 6th-highest Duke season total; behind Trajan Langdon), 194 free throws (10th in Duke history, behind J. J. Redick), and was the 9th player in Duke history to score over 100 points for four seasons. Freshman guard Andre Dawkins said: "Jon's the glue. He takes the big shots."

In his career, he played in 144 consecutive games (most in team history, tied with Chris Duhon), played 4,759 minutes (3rd in both Duke and ACC history, behind Bobby Hurley), had an .861 free throw percentage (3rd in Duke history, and 6th in ACC history), sank 604 free throws (3rd in Duke history, behind Christian Laettner and Redick), 297 3-pointers (4th in school history, ahead of Bobby Hurley, and 10th in ACC history), played 144 games (tied for 4th on Duke's all-time list with Duhon), and had 114 double-figure scoring games (5th all-time at Duke, ahead of Mike Gminski and Grant Hill). In addition, he had 208 steals (8th in school history, behind Grant Hill), and had scored 2,077 points (9th on Duke's all-time list, behind Jason Williams and Gene Banks). Asked to comment on his having passed the career 2,000-points mark, he said: "That's a pretty cool thing. I don't know all the names [of those] who have hit 2,000, but it's a great list to be part of. It's not better than a win tonight, and going to the Sweet 16, but it's still a great honor."

He is the only player in Duke history to record at least 2,000 points, 500 rebounds, 400 assists, 250 3-pointers, and 200 steals in a career.

==== Accolades for the 2009 – 2010 season ====
These are accolades. See the college awards section below for the awards that he won.

- Mid-season candidate for the 2010 Naismith Trophy
- Second in voting for the ACC Player of the Year Award, to Maryland's Greivis Vasquez.
- NABC Senior Achievement Award.
- Jewish Sports Review Division 1 All-America team.

Jon was a finalist for each of the Bob Cousy Award (as top college point guard; awarded to Greivis Vasquez), the Lowe's Senior CLASS Award (as top NCAA Division I basketball senior; awarded to West Virginia's Da'Sean Butler), the John R. Wooden Award, the 2010 Oscar Robertson Trophy. Each national player of the year award went to Ohio State's Evan Turner.

== Professional career ==
=== Rio Grande Valley Vipers (2011) ===
Scheyer played on the Miami Heat's 19-man 2010 NBA Las Vegas Summer League team. He hit the game-winning shot in the team's first game. In the team's second game, however, in mid-July, he was poked in the eye by Joe Ingles of the Golden State Warriors. He suffered a serious, life-changing right eye injury. He needed five stitches to close a cut to his right eyelid, his eye's optic nerve was injured, and he suffered a tear in its retina, which was surgically reattached.

Sidelined initially with an eye patch and incapacitating headaches, he ultimately returned to the court wearing protective goggles to protect his eyes. Maccabi Tel Aviv coach David Blatt also approached Scheyer about playing in Europe.

On September 22, 2010, Scheyer accepted a training camp invitation with the NBA's Los Angeles Clippers. Coach Vinny Del Negro observed:

He just knows how to play, and that's a basketball skill. He's got such a nice feel for the game, and works so hard. There's not much maintenance with him. He doesn't make a lot of mistakes. This is a good chance to take a long look, and see what he can do here.

On October 9, he was waived. After some additional time off to recover from his injury, on February 17, 2011, Scheyer signed a contract with the Rio Grande Valley Vipers, the Houston Rockets D-League team, which had 16 games left in their season. He had turned down several offers from overseas, and offers from other D-League teams.

Scheyer said his eye had healed from the traumatic injury that he suffered in the NBA Summer League. On March 14, he had a D-League career-high 21 points and 7 assists against Sioux Falls Skyforce, the next night he broke those personal records with 24 points and 8 assists, and four nights later he scored a new career-high 27 points which included five three-pointers. In 24 regular and post-season games, he averaged 13.1 points, 4.0 assists, and 4.0 rebounds as the team finished the season as runner-up in the championship.

=== Maccabi Tel Aviv (2011–2012) ===
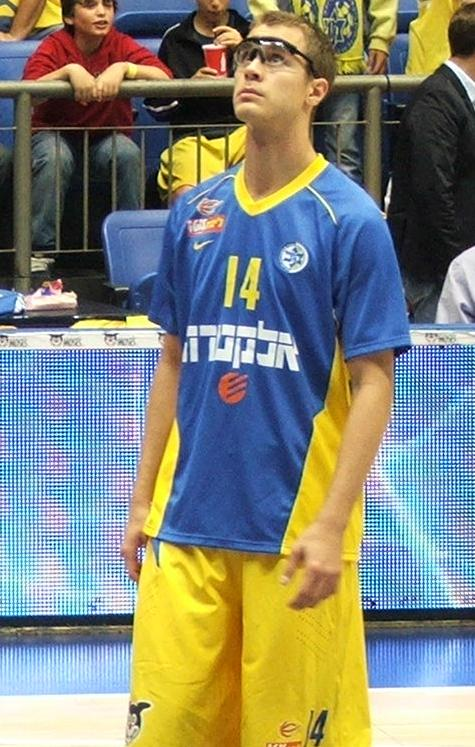
Scheyer with Maccabi Tel Aviv, October 2011

In June 2011, Scheyer signed a two-year contract worth a reported $450,000 with Euroleague contender Maccabi Tel Aviv, the European league's 2011 runner-up and five-time champion. Maccabi Tel Aviv was 26–1 in 2010–11, and included NBA guard Jordan Farmar and former American college players Richard Hendrix (Alabama), Shawn James (Duquesne), and David Blu (University of Southern California). He began playing for Maccabi Tel Aviv when its season started on October 1, 2011.

The team was limited to no more than four players who are non-Israeli, but because Scheyer has a Jewish father he had the ability to obtain Israeli citizenship relatively quickly, and did so in September 2011. As an Israeli citizen, Scheyer did not count towards that limit. "I am really excited to take the next step in my basketball career and go play for Maccabi Tel Aviv," said Scheyer. "I am looking forward to the opportunity to play for a team with such great tradition."

=== Gran Canaria (2012–2013) ===
Scheyer agreed to play with the Philadelphia 76ers in the 2012 Orlando Summer League. Scheyer played in five games in the summer league, averaging 5.8 points and 1.4 assists per game.

After his summer league stint in 2012, Scheyer signed for Gran Canaria 2014 in the Spanish league.

== Awards ==
High School

- 3x Illinois All-State First Team selection
- 2x Gatorade Illinois Player of the Year (2005 & 2006)
- 2x Illinois Hoops Player of the Year (2005 & 2006)
- 2006 Illinois Mr. Basketball
- 2006 Illinois Prep Bullseye Player of the Year
- 2006 Chicago Sun-Times Player of the Year
- 2006 McDonald's All-American
- 2006 Michael Jordan All-American
- 2006 First-team Parade All-American
- 2006 Olympic Junior National Team
- 2005 Fourth-team Parade All-American
- 2000–09 ESPN Illinois Prep All-Decade First Team
- Named one of 100 Legends of Illinois Basketball (1908–2007)
  by Illinois High School Association

College

- 4x ACC Player of the Week
- 3x ACC 2006–07 Rookie of the Week
- 2x All-ACC Tournament First Team (2009 & 2010)
- 2007 ACC All-Freshman Team
- 2009 ACC Tournament MVP
- 2009 ACC Academic Honor Roll
- 2009 NIT Season Tip-Off Tournament MVP
- 2009 (December 14–20), USBWA Oscar Robertson
  National Player of the Week
- 2009–10 Wooden All-American
- 2010 Lowe's Senior All-American First Team
- 2009–10 AP All-America Second Team
- 2009–10 NABC All-America Second Team
- 2009–10 Sporting News All-America Second Team
- 2009–10 USBWA All-America Second Team
- 2009–10 All-ACC First Team
- 2009–10 NABC All-District team
- 2009–10 USBWA All-District team
- 2010 NCAA South All-Regional Team
- 2010 NCAA All-Final Four Team

== Coaching career ==
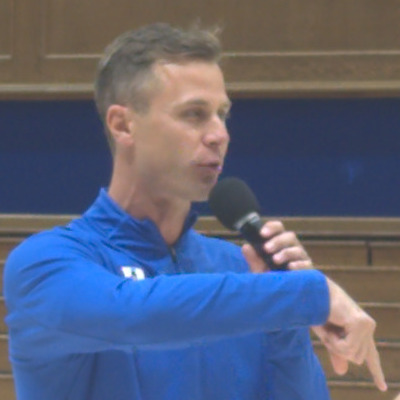
Scheyer in Cameron Indoor Stadium in 2025

Following his overseas career, Scheyer was added to Duke's men's basketball staff by head coach Mike Krzyzewski in April 2013 as a special assistant after the resignation of assistant coach Chris Collins. With the departure of Steve Wojciechowski from the Blue Devils staff, Scheyer was promoted to a full assistant coach on April 18, 2014. Following the departure of associate head coach Jeff Capel to become the head coach at the University of Pittsburgh at the end of the 2018 season, Scheyer was promoted to co-associate head coach along with Nate James. Scheyer served as acting head coach for Duke's 83–82 win over Boston College on January 6, 2021, filling in for Krzyzewski who had to miss the game because he was quarantined after being exposed to COVID-19.

On June 2, 2021, it was announced that Scheyer would become Duke's next head basketball coach after Mike Krzyzewski's retirement following the end of the 2021–22 season. After Krzyzewski retired, he officially became head coach in April 2022. In his first season, he drew the top recruiting class according to 247Sports and Sports Illustrated, and won the ACC tournament before being upset by Tennessee in the second round of the NCAA tournament.

For the 2025–26 season, Scheyer led the Blue Devils to a 35–3 record and both ACC regular season and tournament championships behind National Player of the Year Cameron Boozer. As a No. 1 seed and a favorite to win the championship, the team advanced to the Elite Eight of the 2026 NCAA tournament but gave up a 19-point lead with only six minutes left in the game, with UConn hitting a game-winning shot at the last second. For the season, Scheyer was named ACC Coach of the Year and NABC National Coach of the Year.

== Head coaching record ==
Record table
Season	Team	Overall	Conference	Standing	Postseason
Duke Blue Devils (Atlantic Coast Conference) (2022–present)
2022–23	Duke	27–9	14–6	T–3rd	NCAA Division I Round of 32
2023–24	Duke	27–9	15–5	2nd	NCAA Division I Elite Eight
2024–25	Duke	35–4	19–1	1st	NCAA Division I Final Four
2025–26	Duke	35–3	17–1	1st	NCAA Division I Elite Eight
2026–27	Duke	4–2	0–0		
Duke:		128–27 (.826)	65–13 (.833)		
Total:		128–27 (.826)			
National champion Postseason invitational champion Conference regular season champion Conference regular season and conference tournament champion Division regular season champion Division regular season and conference tournament champion Conference tournament champion

== See also ==
- 2006 boys high school basketball All-Americans
- List of select Jewish basketball players
- List of All-Atlantic Coast Conference men's basketball teams

Awards and achievements
Preceded by Julian Wright	Illinois Mr. Basketball Award Winner; 2006	Succeeded by Derrick Rose
