= Darren Harris (basketball) =

American basketball player

- Harris at Duke's 2026 NCAA Tournament press conference

No. 1 – Indiana Hoosiers
- Position: Shooting guard
- League: Big Ten Conference

Personal information
- Born: August 16, 2005 (age 21)
- Listed height: 6 ft 5 in (1.96 m)
- Listed weight: 205 lb (93 kg)

Career information
- High school: St. Paul VI (Chantilly, Virginia)
- College: Duke (2024–2026); Indiana (2026–present)
Medals
Men's basketball
Representing United States
FISU America Games
| Gold medal – first place | 2026 Peru | Team competition |

Darren Harris is an American college basketball player for the Indiana Hoosiers. He previously played for the Duke Blue Devils.

== Early life ==
Harris attended St. Paul VI Catholic High School, where he was named the 2023-24 Virginia MaxPreps Player of the Year. As a senior, Harris averaged 17.2 points, 4.5 rebounds, 3.1 assists, and 1.9 steals per game, while also leading the team to a 33-2 overall record, winning a WCAC conference championship and VISAA state championship. While at St. Paul, he volunteered with United Way and the Special Olympics, while also volunteering as a youth basketball coach. He committed to play for Duke on October 22, 2022, over offers from Maryland, Miami, and Ohio State.

Prior to college, Harris played in the Nike Elite Youth Basketball League (EYBL) for three years, playing for Team Takeover. While in the EYBL, Harris was named the MVP after winning the 2024 Peach Jam.

== College career ==
=== Duke ===
As a freshman at Duke, Harris averaged two points and 1.1 rebounds in six minutes per game. As a sophomore, he averaged 3.3 points and 0.8 rebounds in 9.7 minutes per game. Harris set a new career high in points in a 101-53 win against Notre Dame, scoring 16 points in 17 minutes.

In his time at Duke, Harris totaled 162 points, 54 rebounds, 20 assists, and 14 steals with 57 games played. Harris also helped to recruit former St. Paul VI teammate Patrick Ngongba II to play for the Blue Devils.

=== Indiana ===
On April 20, 2026, Harris committed to play for the Indiana Hoosiers with two years of eligibility remaining.

== National team career ==
Harris was a part of the Indiana team chosen to represent the United States in the 2026 FISU America Games in Lima, Peru. He helped the U.S. capture the gold medal after winning all four games with an average victory margin of 60.8 points. Harris scored 13 points in their 99–57 win over the Virgin Islands in the gold medal game.

== Personal life ==
Harris' mother, Roxy, who gave birth to him at age 20, is a former college basketball player and coached youth basketball. His father, Kevin, is a high school basketball coach at Flint Hill School. Both of his parents were Duke fans, leading Harris to become a fan of the university when he was younger.

Harris is a sneaker enthusiast, who has been noted for wearing customized or rare pairs of shoes during games and public appearances.

== Career statistics ==
Legend
| GP | Games played | GS | Games started | MPG | Minutes per game |
| FG% | Field goal percentage | 3P% | 3-point field goal percentage | FT% | Free throw percentage |
| RPG | Rebounds per game | APG | Assists per game | SPG | Steals per game |
| BPG | Blocks per game | PPG | Points per game | **Bold** | Career high |

=== College ===
| Year | Team | GP | GS | MPG | FG% | 3P% | FT% | RPG | APG | SPG | BPG | PPG |
|---|---|---|---|---|---|---|---|---|---|---|---|---|
| 2024–25 | Duke | 21 | 0 | 6.0 | **.366** | .227 | .500 | **1.1** | 0.3 | 0.1 | 0.0 | 2.0 |
| 2025–26 | Duke | **36** | 0 | **9.7** | .363 | **.333** | **.769** | 0.8 | **0.4** | **0.3** | 0.0 | **3.3** |
| 2026–27 | Indiana | | | | | | | | | | | |
| Career | | 57 | 0 | 8.3 | .364 | .308 | .691 | 0.9 | 0.4 | 0.2 | 0.0 | 2.8 |
