= Isaiah Evans =

American basketball player (born 2005)

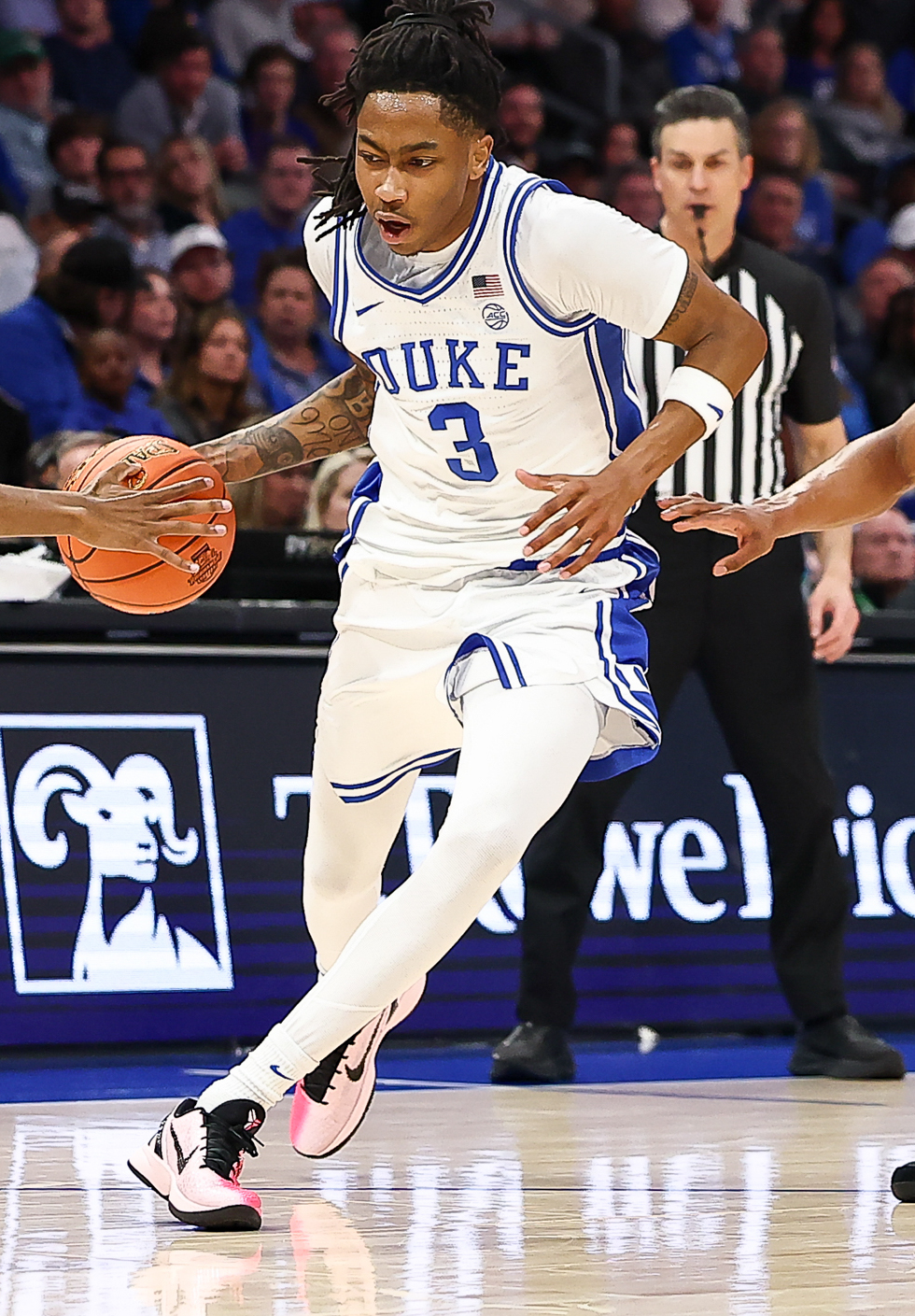
- Evans with the Duke Blue Devils in 2026

No. 33 – Minnesota Timberwolves
- Position: Small forward
- League: NBA

Personal information
- Born: December 6, 2005 (age 20) Fayetteville, North Carolina, U.S.
- Listed height: 6 ft 6 in (1.98 m)
- Listed weight: 175 lb (79 kg)

Career information
- High school: North Mecklenburg (Huntersville, North Carolina)
- College: Duke (2024–2026)
- NBA draft: 2026: 2nd round, 33rd overall pick
- Drafted by: Brooklyn Nets
- Playing career: 2026–present

Career history
- 2026–present: Minnesota Timberwolves
- 2026: →Iowa Wolves

Career highlights
- Third-team All-ACC (2026); McDonald's All-American (2024); 2× North Carolina Mr. Basketball (2023, 2024)
- Stats at NBA.com
- Stats at Basketball Reference

Isaiah Demonte Evans (born December 6, 2005) is an American basketball player for the Minnesota Timberwolves of the National Basketball Association (NBA). He played college basketball for the Duke Blue Devils.

== Early life and high school ==
Evans grew up in Charlotte, North Carolina and attended North Mecklenburg High School in Huntersville, North Carolina. He averaged 26 points and 6.4 rebounds per game as a junior. Evans averaged 38.6 points over five games in the NCHSAA 4A state playoffs and was named North Carolina Mr. Basketball at the end of the season. Evans averaged 27.4 points, 6.1 rebounds, 3.2 assists and 2.3 steals per contest to guide the Vikings to a 30–3 record and a NCHSAA 4A state championship. He was selected to play in the 2024 McDonald's All-American Boys Game during his senior year. Evans also repeated as North Carolina Mr. Basketball. He was also named the Gatorade North Carolina Player of the Year for boys basketball.

Evans was a consensus five-star recruit and one of the top players in the 2024 class, according to major recruiting services. He committed to play college basketball at Duke over offers from Kansas, NC State, Tennessee, Texas, Auburn, and Florida State. Evans signed a National Letter of Intent to play for the Blue Devils on November 13, 2023, during the early signing period.

== College career ==
Evans enrolled at Duke University in June 2024 in order to take part in the Blue Devils' summer practices. Evans spent his freshman season playing behind future first-overall draft pick Cooper Flagg and averaged 6.8 points, 1.1 rebounds, and 0.5 assists per game. After the season he initially declared for the 2025 NBA draft, but ultimately decided to return to Duke for his sophomore season. Following his sophomore season at Duke, Evans officially declared for the 2026 NBA draft on April 22, 2026.

== Professional career ==
On June 17, Evans received an invitation to sit in the NBA draft green room as one of 24 top prospects expected to be selected early in the event. However, during the first round of the draft on June 23, Evans went unselected, making him the only green room invitee not drafted on the event's opening night. On June 24, 2026, the Brooklyn Nets eventually selected him with the 33rd overall pick. Because of Evans' draft rights being part of a pre-draft, three-team trade involving Julius Randle, the Minnesota Timberwolves would end up receiving him.

== Career statistics ==
Legend
GP	Games played	GS	Games started	MPG	Minutes per game
FG%	Field goal percentage	3P%	3-point field goal percentage	FT%	Free throw percentage
RPG	Rebounds per game	APG	Assists per game	SPG	Steals per game
BPG	Blocks per game	PPG	Points per game	**Bold**	Career high

=== College ===
Year	Team	GP	GS	MPG	FG%	3P%	FT%	RPG	APG	SPG	BPG	PPG
2024–25	Duke	36	3	13.8	.432	.416	.813	1.1	.5	.2	.1	6.8
2025–26	Duke	**38**	**38**	**28.2**	**.433**	.361	**.860**	**3.2**	**1.3**	**.7**	**.7**	**15.0**
Career		74	41	21.2	.432	.380	.849	2.2	.9	.5	.4	11.0
