= Maliq Brown =

American basketball player (born 2003)

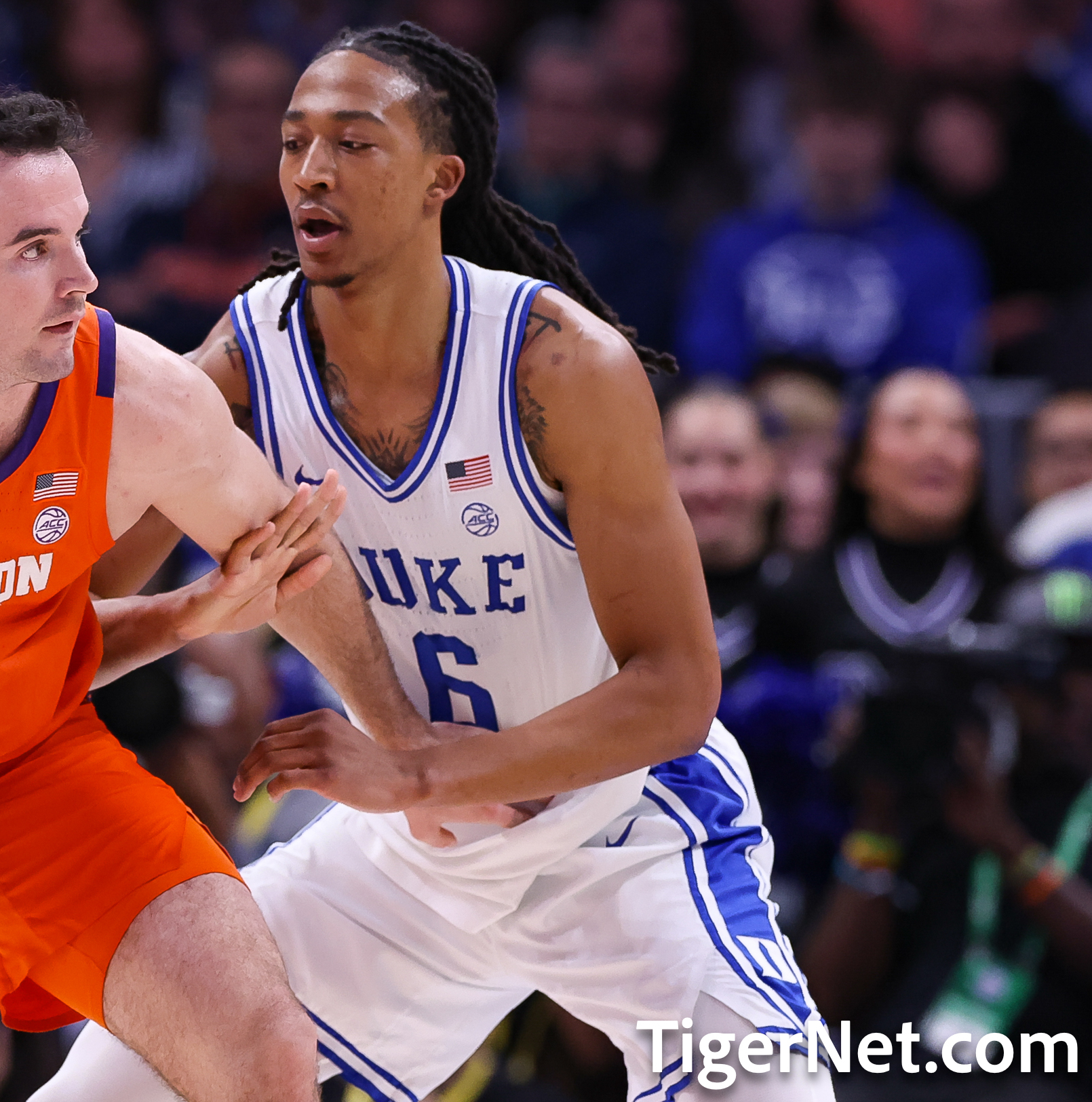

No. 15 – San Antonio Spurs
- Position: Power forward
- League: NBA

Personal information
- Born: November 15, 2003 (age 23) Culpeper, Virginia, U.S.
- Listed height: 6 ft 8 in (2.03 m)
- Listed weight: 225 lb (102 kg)

Career information
- High school: Blue Ridge School (Saint George, Virginia)
- College: Syracuse (2022–2024); Duke (2024–2026)
- NBA draft: 2026: 2nd round, 44th overall pick
- Drafted by: San Antonio Spurs
- Playing career: 2026–present

Career history
- 2026–present: San Antonio Spurs
- 2026–present: →Austin Spurs

Career highlights
- Lefty Driesell Award (2026); ACC Defensive Player of the Year (2026); ACC Sixth Man of the Year (2026); 2× ACC All-Defensive Team (2024, 2026)
- Stats at NBA.com
- Stats at Basketball Reference

Maliq Xavier Brown (born November 15, 2003) is an American basketball player for the San Antonio Spurs of the National Basketball Association (NBA), on a two-way contract with the Austin Spurs of the NBA G League. He played college basketball for the Syracuse Orange and Duke Blue Devils.

== Early life ==
Brown was born in Culpeper, Virginia into an athletic family, and began football at age five and basketball at around age seven. He attended Blue Ridge School, an independent all-boys high school in St. George, Virginia, where he was a four-time VISAA Division II basketball state champion. Brown was selected as VISAA Division II Player of the Year and first-team All-VISAA his senior year, averaging 15.4 points, 11.1 rebounds, 2.2 assists, 2.4 steals and 1.5 blocks.

=== College recruitment ===
Brown was consistently rated a three-star prospect and top-15 player in the Virginia class of 2022. He received over a dozen offers to play college basketball before committing to Syracuse over Virginia Tech, NC State, Penn State and Georgetown, and signed a National Letter of Intent on November 12, 2021.

== College career ==
=== Syracuse (2022–2024) ===
Brown enrolled at Syracuse on June 3, 2022 and participated in summer practices. He appeared in 29 games and made seven starts, averaging 20.2 minutes per game. Brown contributed a double-double in a home win over Virginia Tech, and scored a career-high 18 points and four steals in a loss at Georgia Tech.

As a sophomore, Brown saw a significant uptick in production, starting 18 of 32 games played. He achieved the double-double mark four times, including in the ACC Tournament against NC State. On February 7, 2024, against Louisville, Brown scored 11 points on 4-for-4 shooting with nine rebounds, five assists, six blocks and five steals. He finished the year with 230 rebounds, 29 blocks, and a conference-high 71 steals, and was named to the ACC All-Defensive team, receiving the third-highest number of votes.

=== Duke (2024–2026) ===
Following his sophomore season, Brown announced he would be entering the transfer portal on April 2, 2024. He was rated a top-15 power forward in the portal and around 70th overall. Brown visited Duke on April 18, and committed to the Blue Devils on April 20.

Brown matched his career-high of five steals in a loss against Kansas, the highest output for a Duke player since Paolo Banchero in 2022. In the loss, Brown was kicked in the head by Kansas big man Hunter Dickinson, causing Dickinson to be ejected from the game. In a win over Notre Dame, Brown suffered a sprained knee, causing him to miss four games. He then suffered a dislocated shoulder in the Blue Devils' win at Virginia, and missed another four games before returning in the final game of the regular season in a win at North Carolina. In the first game of the ACC Tournament, Brown re-aggravated his shoulder injury, missing the remainder of the tournament and the opening rounds of the NCAA Tournament. He saw limited minutes in the Sweet 16 and Elite Eight, before notching four points, three rebounds and two steals in 15 minutes in a Final Four loss to Houston.

On April 23, 2025, the program announced on Instagram that Brown would return for his senior year.

Brown scored 10 points against Western Carolina, hitting double-digits for the first time as a Blue Devil. He notched 12 deflections against Indiana State, and notably deflected a last-second inbound by Florida to clinch Duke's victory. Brown scored a Duke career-best with 11 points against Lipscomb and matched his career-high again with five steals in a loss to Texas Tech. He started for the first time as a Blue Devil in a win against SMU, and recorded five assists for the first time at Duke against Stanford and Wake Forest.

== Professional career ==
On June 24, 2026, the San Antonio Spurs selected Brown with the 44th overall pick in the 2026 NBA draft. He signed a two-way contract with Spurs on 3 July, 2026.

== Career statistics ==
Legend
GP	Games played	GS	Games started	MPG	Minutes per game
FG%	Field goal percentage	3P%	3-point field goal percentage	FT%	Free throw percentage
RPG	Rebounds per game	APG	Assists per game	SPG	Steals per game
BPG	Blocks per game	PPG	Points per game	**Bold**	Career high

=== College ===
Year	Team	GP	GS	MPG	FG%	3P%	FT%	RPG	APG	SPG	BPG	PPG
2022–23	Syracuse	29	7	20.2	**.698**	-	.567	4.6	.9	.9	.5	5.7
2023–24	Syracuse	32	**18**	**29.6**	**.698**	**.368**	**.721**	**7.2**	**1.8**	**2.2**	**.9**	**9.5**
2024–25	Duke	26	0	15.8	.659	.333	.375	3.7	1.5	1.3	.3	2.5
2025–26	Duke	**38**	10	20.3	.629	.167	.500	5.2	1.6	1.8	.6	4.9
Career		125	35	21.7	.675	.262	.596	5.2	1.5	1.6	.6	5.8
