= Mason Gillis =

American basketball player (born 2000)

KTP Basket
- Position: Power forward
- League: Korisliiga

Personal information
- Born: November 24, 2000 (age 25) New Castle, Indiana, U.S.
- Listed height: 6 ft 6 in (1.98 m)
- Listed weight: 225 lb (102 kg)

Career information
- High school: New Castle (New Castle, Indiana)
- College: Purdue (2020–2024); Duke (2024–2025)
- Playing career: 2025–present

Career history
- 2025–2026: Limburg United
- 2026–: KTP Basket

Career highlights
- Big Ten Sixth Man of the Year (2024)

Mason Gillis (born November 24, 2000) is an American professional basketball player for KTP Basket of the Korisliiga. He played college basketball for the Duke Blue Devils and the Purdue Boilermakers.

== Early life and high school career ==
Gillis was born in New Castle, Indiana. He attended New Castle High School and was named an Indiana Junior All-Star following his junior season in which he averaged 21.6 points, 12.2 rebounds, and 2.3 assists per game. However, following a knee injury, Gillis missed the entirety of his senior season.

Gillis was rated a four-star recruit and committed to playing college basketball for Purdue over several other offers including Butler and Xavier.

== College career ==
=== Redshirt ===
After missing his senior season in high school with a knee injury, Gillis redshirted in his first season at Purdue.

=== Freshman season ===
Gillis appeared in 28 games, with 23 starts. On December 21, 2020, Gillis was named Big Ten Freshman of the Week.

=== Sophomore season ===
Gillis started in 25 games of the 33 he played in. He was one of nine players nationally to shoot at least 48% from the field, 40% from 3, and 85% from the free throw line.

=== Junior season ===
Gillis played in 32 games, starting in 15. On February 1, 2023, Gillis made 9 3-pointers in a game against Penn State. This was the second most in a single game in Purdue history, behind Carsen Edwards and the most ever in Mackey Arena.

=== Senior season ===
Gillis appeared in a school record 39 games, all off the bench. Following the season, he was recognized as the Big Ten Sixth Man of the Year. He also shot 46.8% from 3, which was fifth best for a single season in Purdue history. Gillis's contributions helped Purdue to advance to the 2024 NCAA Tournament final.

=== COVID eligibility ===
Despite playing four full seasons at Purdue, Gillis maintained a season of eligibility due to the blanket COVID waiver for the 2020–21 season. On April 26, Gillis committed to Duke to play his final college season.

== Professional career ==
=== Limburg United (2025–2026) ===
On June 24, 2025, Gillis signed with Limburg United of the BNXT League.

== Career statistics ==
Legend
GP	Games played	GS	Games started	MPG	Minutes per game
FG%	Field goal percentage	3P%	3-point field goal percentage	FT%	Free throw percentage
RPG	Rebounds per game	APG	Assists per game	SPG	Steals per game
BPG	Blocks per game	PPG	Points per game	**Bold**	Career high

=== College ===
Year	Team	GP	GS	MPG	FG%	3P%	FT%	RPG	APG	SPG	BPG	PPG
2019–20	Purdue	Redshirt										
2020–21	Purdue	28	23	22.2	.465	.352	.814	4.1	1.3	.4	.1	5.2
2021–22	Purdue	33	**25**	**23.5**	**.496**	.414	.850	**4.8**	1.1	.4	**.2**	6.4
2022–23	Purdue	32	15	20.5	.458	.356	.796	3.8	1.4	**.5**	.1	**6.8**
2023–24	Purdue	**39**	0	21.1	.479	**.468**	**.860**	3.9	**1.7**	.2	.0	6.5
Career		132	63	21.8	.475	.407	.829	4.2	1.4	.4	.1	6.3

== Personal life ==
Gillis's older sister played volleyball at Wisconsin. Gillis played for the Great Lakes Region in the 2012 Little League World Series, representing his home town of New Castle.

== See also ==
- List of NCAA Division I men's basketball career games played leaders
