= Deron Rippey Jr. =

American basketball player (born 2007)

No. 3 – Duke Blue Devils
- Position: Point guard
- Conference: Atlantic Coast Conference

Personal information
- Born: August 1, 2007 (age 19) New York City, U.S.
- Listed height: 6 ft 3 in (1.91 m)
- Listed weight: 185 lb (84 kg)

Career information
- High school: Blair Academy (Blairstown, New Jersey)
- College: Duke (2026–present)

Career highlights
- Morgan Wootten National Player of the Year (2026); McDonald's All-American (2026)

Deron Rippey Jr. (born August 1, 2007) is an American college basketball player for the Duke Blue Devils of the Atlantic Coast Conference (ACC). He played high school basketball for Blair Academy in Blairstown, New Jersey, where he was a five-star prospect and one of the top recruits in the class of 2026.

== Early life ==
Rippey was born on August 1, 2007. The youngest of five children, Rippey's four sisters each played basketball, and his father played college basketball for the East Carolina Pirates. Rippey played basketball from a young age and started competing in tournaments at age nine. From sixth grade through eighth grade, he attended The Rectory School in Connecticut, where he helped the basketball team compile a record of 11–3 with a championship in his last year. He then enrolled at Blair Academy in New Jersey, serving as the team's sixth man as a freshman and then becoming their starting point guard as a sophomore.

As a junior in 2024–25, Rippey averaged 16.2 points, 5.3 assists and 4.9 rebounds per game and was named the Gatorade New Jersey Player of the Year. He led Blair to the state championship, where he posted a triple-double, recording 16 points, 13 assists and 11 rebounds in an 88–75 win over The Patrick School. After his junior year, he played in the Adidas 3SSB circuit, averaging 15.2 points, 3.2 rebounds and 5.1 assists.

A five-star recruit, Rippey is a consensus top-20 prospect nationally. He is also the number one ranked point guard recruit and the top recruit in New Jersey. He committed to play college basketball for the Duke Blue Devils.
