= Dame Sarr =

Italian-Senegalese basketball player

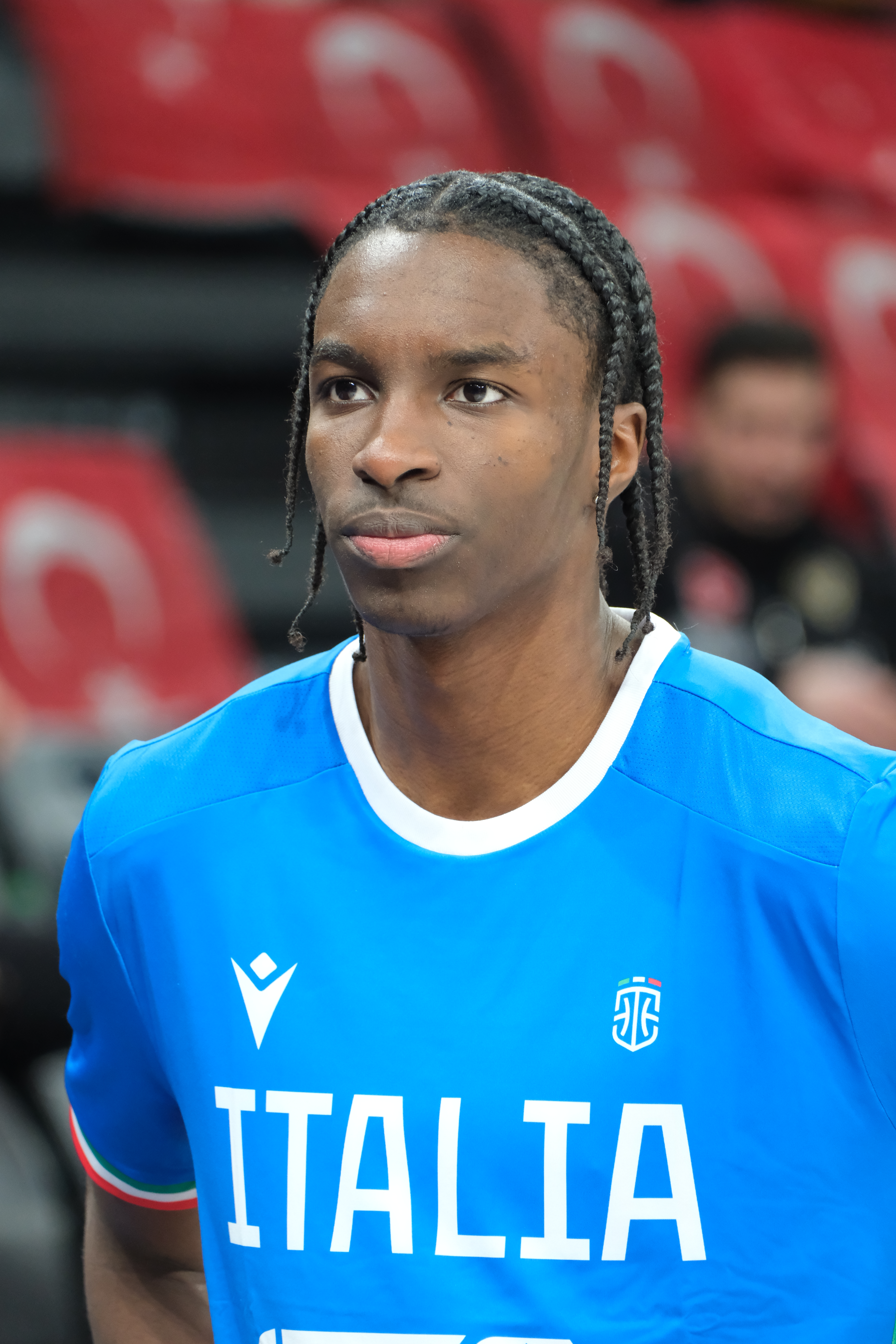
- Sarr with Italy in 2025

No. 7 – Duke Blue Devils
- Position: Shooting guard / small forward
- League: Atlantic Coast Conference

Personal information
- Born: 4 June 2006 (age 20) Oderzo, Italy
- Listed height: 6 ft 8 in (2.03 m)
- Listed weight: 190 lb (86 kg)

Career information
- College: Duke (2025–present)
- Playing career: 2022–present

Career history
- 2022–2025: FC Barcelona
- 2022–2023: →FC Barcelona B

Career highlights
- ACC All-Defensive team (2026); Nike Hoop Summit (2025)

Elhadji Dame Sarr (dɑːmeɪ sɑːr / dah-m-ay s-ar, born 4 June 2006) is an Italian college basketball player for the Duke Blue Devils of the Atlantic Coast Conference (ACC). Sarr formerly played for FC Barcelona of the Spanish Liga ACB and the EuroLeague, and has also represented the Italian national team. Standing at 6 ft 8 in (2.03 m), Sarr plays in the shooting guard position.

== Early life and youth career ==
Dame Sarr was born in Oderzo, Italy, to parents from Senegal. He started playing basketball in the youth ranks of his local team Basket Oderzo, which he joined in 2012 at only 6 years old. He would join Orange1 Basket Bassano in 2019. FC Barcelona noticed him while playing for the local team at a tournament held in Bassano del Grappa in 2022. Sarr would sign for the Catalans in the summer of 2022. During the 2022–23 season, Sarr would play both for the FC Barcelona Junior team and the FC Barcelona B team in the Liga EBA.

== Professional career ==
While still being a FC Barcelona B player, Sarr would make his professional debut for the FC Barcelona first team in January 2023. Playing the last seconds of a 2022–23 Liga ACB win against Bilbao Basket, he became the second youngest player to play an official game for the Catalans.

Continuing to play for FC Barcelona B during the 2023–24 season, Sarr would occasionally be called up to the first team, making his EuroLeague debut in a win against Panathinaikos in November 2023.

Sarr joined the FC Barcelona first team roster for the 2024–25 season. In March 2025, Sarr had a breakout game in a Liga ACB win over CB Breogán at Palau Blaugrana, scoring 21 points and recording 3 assists.

Sarr sparked controversy in April 2025 when he unilaterally decided to travel to Portland, Oregon to play in the 2025 Nike Hoop Summit, after Barcelona had denied his request to do so. Barcelona released a statement acknowledging the player's actions, regarding them as a breach of his obligations. Barcelona and Sarr would ultimately reach an agreement to part ways on April 17, 2025, with Sarr being left off the team's roster for the remainder of the season.

== National team career ==
Sarr has represented Italy in several youth-level competitions, most notably the 2022 U16 European Championship, the 2023 U18 European Championship and the 2024 U18 EuroBasket.

On 25 November 2024 Sarr made his debut for the Italian national team in a EuroBasket 2025 qualifier game against the Icelandic national team.

== College career ==
After the 2025 Nike Hoop Summit, Sarr began to be recruited by several college basketball programs. After receiving interest from schools such as Oregon, Illinois and Kansas, he committed to Duke on May 22, 2025. After the 25-26 season, Sarr announced that he will be returning to college for his sophomore year.

== Career statistics ==
Legend
GP	Games played	GS	Games started	MPG	Minutes per game
FG%	Field-goal percentage	3P%	3-point field-goal percentage	FT%	Free-throw percentage
RPG	Rebounds per game	APG	Assists per game	SPG	Steals per game
BPG	Blocks per game	PPG	Points per game	PIR	Performance index rating
**Bold**	Career high

=== EuroLeague ===
Year	Team	GP	GS	MPG	FG%	3P%	FT%	RPG	APG	SPG	BPG	PPG	PIR
2023–24	Barcelona	2	0	1.5	.000	.000	—	—	—	—	—	—	-1.5
2024–25	Barcelona	15	2	5.1	.636	.500	.167	.7	.6	.4	.1	1.8	2.1
Career		17	2	4.44	.583	.400	.167	.6	.5	.4	.1	1.6	1.7

=== Domestic leagues ===
Year	Team	League	GP	MPG	FG%	3P%	FT%	RPG	APG	SPG	BPG	PPG
2022–23	(Spain) Barcelona	ACB	3	2.7	.444	.000	—	.3	—	—	—	2.7
2023–24	(Spain) Barcelona	ACB	2	2.0	.500	.333	—	—	—	—	—	2.5
2024–25	(Spain) Barcelona	ACB	12	12.6	.521	.429	.556	1.7	.7	.2	.3	5.8
