= Cameron Williams (basketball) =

American basketball player (born 2007)

No. 14 – Duke Blue Devils
- Position: Power forward
- Conference: Atlantic Coast Conference

Personal information
- Born: October 25, 2007 (age 19)
- Listed height: 7 ft 0 in (2.13 m)
- Listed weight: 215 lb (98 kg)

Career information
- High school: St. Mary's (Phoenix, Arizona)
- College: Duke (2026–present)

Career highlights
- McDonald's All-American (2026)

Cameron Williams (born October 25, 2007) is an American college basketball for the Duke Blue Devils of the Atlantic Coast Conference (ACC). He played high school basketball at St. Mary's High School in Phoenix, Arizona. He was a five-star prospect and one of the top recruits in the class of 2026.

== Early life ==
Williams is from Phoenix, Arizona. He grew up playing basketball and attended St. Mary's High School, where he became a top player. As a sophomore, he appeared in 27 games and averaged 14.1 points and 11.1 rebounds per game. In his junior season, 2024–25, he averaged 18.0 points, 11.1 rebounds and 3.6 assists while making 51% of his shots. Williams helped St. Mary' to the state 4A championship game in his junior year. In the championship, he made a three-point shot that gave his team the lead in the final minute of overtime, finishing with 30 points, 11 rebounds and three blocks in a 59–55 win.

Williams impressed at the Section 7 showcase and the NBA Top 100 camp in June 2025. He is a five-star recruit, the consensus top power forward and one of the top-10 overall prospects in the class of 2026. He is ranked by ESPN as the third-best prospect nationally, while 247Sports ranks him fourth and Rivals.com 10th. He committed to play college basketball for the Duke Blue Devils over Texas and Arizona.
