= On3.com =

Sports website

- Website type: Sports news and data
- Available in: English
- Headquarters: Nashville, Tennessee
- Founder: Shannon Terry
- Website: www.on3.com
- Registration: Depending on individual usage
- Launched: August 15, 2021; 5 years ago
- Current status: Online

On3.com is a network of websites that focus on college and professional sports. The network was founded in 2021 by Shannon Terry, former co-founder of Rivals.com and founder of 247Sports. Following its acquisition of Rivals.com in 2025, a rivals section began focusing on high school news and college football, basketball and softball recruiting, with On3 focusing on collegiate news, including the transfer portal and leading in name, image, and likeness (NIL) information.

Aside from articles, podcasts, and video content, On3 includes a broad-based college sports database. As of 2026, it has over 100 team specific collegiate sites. Before the acquisition of rivals, On3 published separate individual high school athlete rankings, which have since merged. The 5 Goats section of the website focuses on professional sports, including the NBA, NFL, NASCAR, sports betting and culture.

== History ==
On3.com was founded by Shannon Terry. Along with a business partner, he sold his first company, college recruiting site Alliance Sports, to Rivals.com for $3 million, which he re-purchased for $500,000 when it fell into bankruptcy. Terry kept the Rivals.com branding and rapidly turned a profit using a subscription-based model, growing to 230,000 subscribers before it was sold to Yahoo! in 2007 for a reported $98 million. In 2010, he founded 247Sports, which was acquired by CBS in 2015 for an undisclosed amount, though he continued to serve as CEO until resigning in 2020. Terry announced his new venture, On3.com, in 2021, in an effort to combine his expertise in recruiting and college sports media with the "untapped space around NIL opportunities", referring to name, image, and likeness.

On3.com's first hire was former ESPN college football writer Ivan Maisel, who was named senior writer and vice president of editorial in June 2021. The following month, the company acquired a pair of independent team sites, Kentucky Sports Radio and Lettermen Row, to start building their national network. The site officially launched on August 15, 2021. Like Terry's previous sites, On3.com quickly established itself as a reliable source for recruiting information, and was especially noted for "being ahead of the curve" on news related to the transfer portal and name, image, and likeness (NIL) deals. On3.com added female athletes to its player database in October 2022.

In December 2022, On3.com launched an interactive platform called On3 Athlete Network to allow athletes to access their NIL valuations and seek revenue opportunities. This was followed a month later by the formation of On3 OS, its business-to-business division to help college athletes and athletic programs alike manage their NIL activities. Later that year, On3 hosted the inaugural On3 Elite Series, a two-day conference aimed to help guide consensus five-star football recruits to navigate through the emerging NIL landscape. At its second annual event, speakers included NFL players DeAndre Hopkins and Will Levis.

In 2024, On3 hired Steve Wiltfong, ex-recruiting director for 247Sports. Later that year, On3 Media raised over $36 million in equity from 27 investors. The following year, it was reported that On3's ownership group would acquire Rivals.com.

In May 2025, it was confirmed that the On3 ownership group had acquired Rivals.com from Yahoo Sports, reuniting Terry with the first recruiting network he co-founded in the 1990s. As part of the deal, Yahoo Sports retained a minority equity stake in the enterprise. Following the acquisition, the company announced the consolidation of its recruiting databases. In June 2025, the "On300" and "Rivals250" rankings were merged to form the Rivals300, creating a unified industry ranking system. By August 2025, several major independent fan sites, such as Tar Heel Illustrated, had migrated to the combined On3/Rivals network.

== NIL Valuation ==
On3 is widely cited for its "NIL Valuation" metric, which estimates the projected annual value of high school and college athletes. Originally based on a "Performance, Influence, and Exposure" algorithm, the methodology was overhauled in December 2024 to a "Total Player Value" (TPV) model. This updated model splits valuations into two distinct categories: Roster Value (collective-driven compensation similar to a salary) and NIL Value (traditional marketing and brand endorsements).

== Editorial controversies ==
In December 2025, On3 issued a retraction and public apology regarding a report by senior reporter Joe Tipton. The report incorrectly claimed that active NBA player Trentyn Flowers was being recruited by college programs for a return to NCAA eligibility. On3 CEO Shannon Terry stated that the report "fell below our standards" and announced implemented changes to the network's editorial oversight processes.
