= Caleb Foster =

American basketball player (born 2004)

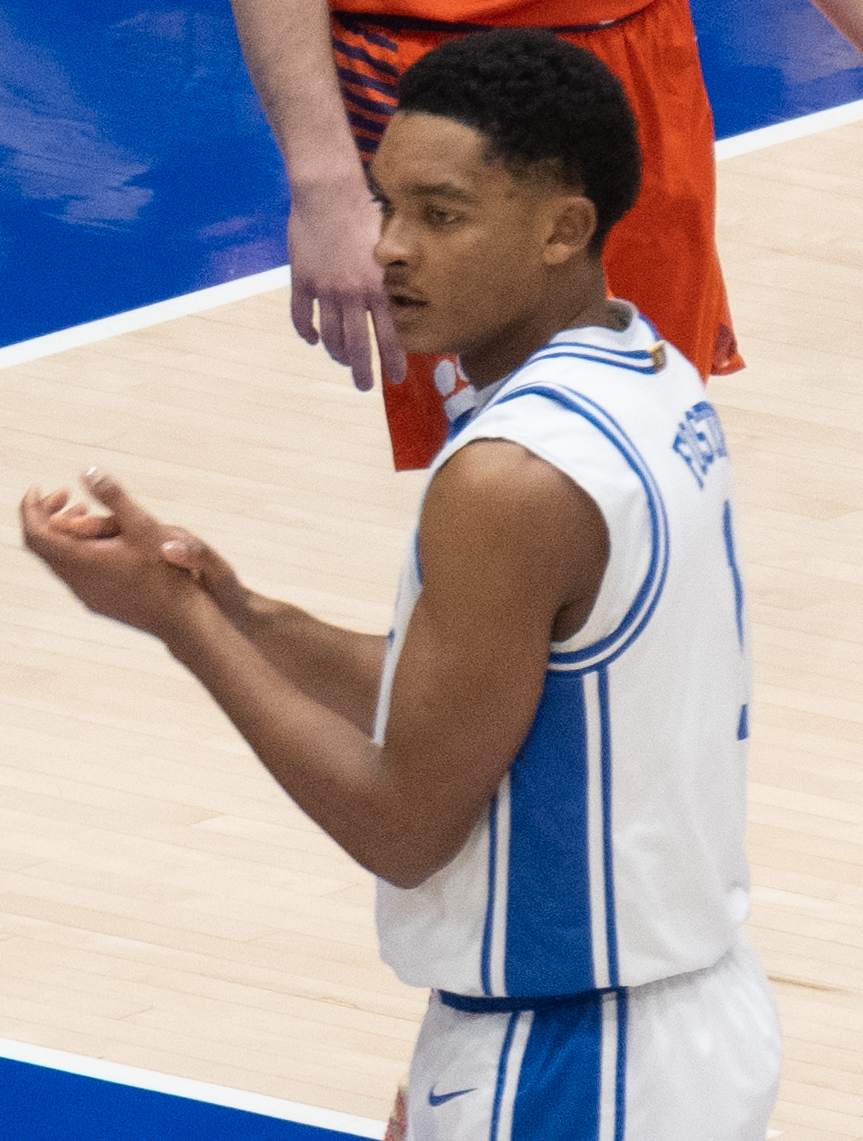
- Foster in 2026

No. 1 – Duke Blue Devils
- Position: Point guard / shooting guard
- League: Atlantic Coast Conference

Personal information
- Born: July 16, 2004 (age 22)
- Listed height: 6 ft 5 in (1.96 m)
- Listed weight: 205 lb (93 kg)

Career information
- High school: Hickory Ridge (Harrisburg, North Carolina); Oak Hill Academy (Mouth of Wilson, Virginia); Notre Dame (Sherman Oaks, California)
- College: Duke (2023–present)

Caleb Foster (born July 16, 2004) is an American college basketball player for the Duke Blue Devils of the Atlantic Coast Conference (ACC).

== Early life and high school ==
Foster grew up in Harrisburg, North Carolina and initially attended Hickory Ridge High School. After his sophomore year he transferred to Oak Hill Academy in Mouth of Wilson, Virginia as a boarding student. Foster transferred a second time to Notre Dame High School in Sherman Oaks, California before the start of his senior season. He committed to play college basketball at Duke over offers Auburn, Louisville, Tennessee, Virginia, Clemson, and Wake Forest.

== College career ==
Foster began his freshman season as a key reserve for the Duke Blue Devils. He suffered a stress fracture in his ankle in February 2024 and missed both the ACC and NCAA tournaments. Foster averaged 7.7 points, 2.4 rebounds, and 2.1 assists over 27 games.
