= Patrick Ngongba II =

American basketball player (born 2006)

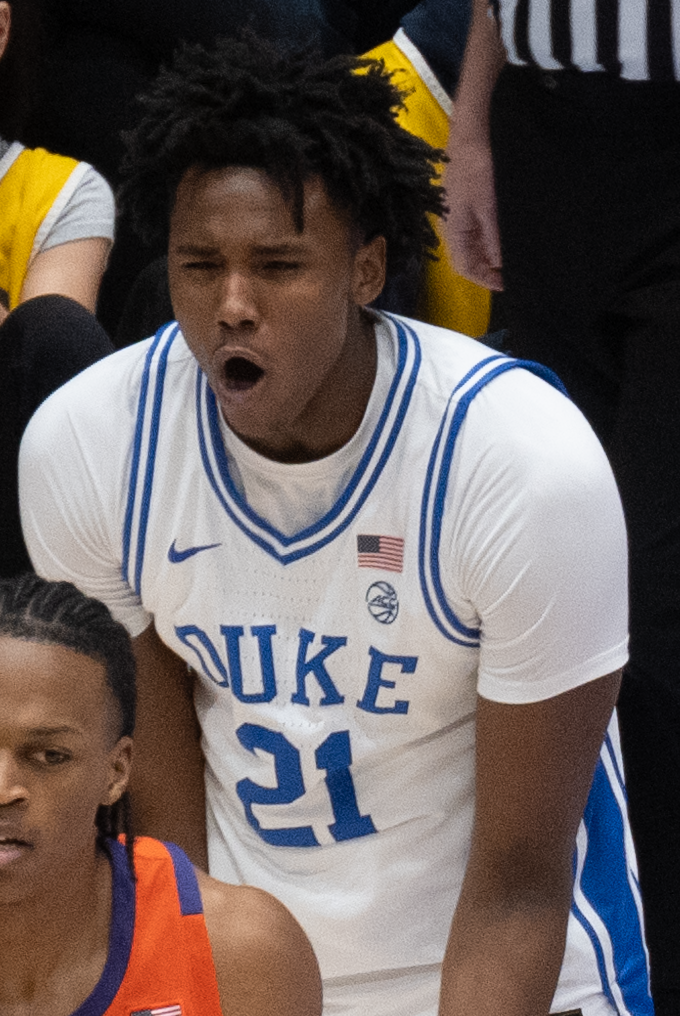
- Ngongba in 2026

No. 21 – Duke Blue Devils
- Position: Center
- League: Atlantic Coast Conference

Personal information
- Born: February 13, 2006 (age 20) Washington, D.C., U.S.
- Listed height: 6 ft 11 in (2.11 m)
- Listed weight: 250 lb (113 kg)

Career information
- High school: Paul VI (Chantilly, Virginia)
- College: Duke (2024–present)
Medals
Men's basketball
Representing the United States
FIBA Under-18 AmeriCup
Gold medal – first place	2024 Argentina	Team

Patrick Ngongba II is an American college basketball player for the Duke Blue Devils of the Atlantic Coast Conference (ACC).

== Early life and high school ==
Ngongba was born in Washington, D.C. and attended Paul VI Catholic High School in Chantilly, Virginia. He missed the entirety of his senior season due to a foot injury which required surgery. During the EYBL circuit with Team Takeover, he averaged 12.0 points and 7.4 rebounds per game. Coming out of high school, Ngongba II was rated as a five-star recruit, the 3rd best center, and the 19th overall player in the class of 2024 by ESPN, and committed to play college basketball for the Duke Blue Devils over offers from schools such as Kansas State, Kentucky, Michigan, North Texas, and UConn.

== College career ==
In his Blue Devil debut on November 16, 2024, Ngongba posted two points, six rebounds, and two assists in a win over Wofford. On February 17, 2025, he scored eight points in a victory against Virginia. In the Sweet Sixteen of the 2025 NCAA tournament, Ngongba II tallied eight points, two rebounds, and an assist in 12 minutes of a win over Arizona.

== National team career ==
After recovering from a foot injury in high school, Ngongba II tried out and made the U.S. national under-18 team for the 2024 FIBA Under-18 AmeriCup, where he averaged 4.5 points, 4.8 rebounds, 1.2 blocks and 1.0 assist per game, as he helped win gold.

== Personal life ==
Both of his parents played college basketball at George Washington, while his mother Tajama Abraham Ngongba went on to play in the WNBA and is currently a coach at her alma mater. His cousin, Isiah Abraham, currently plays for the Georgetown Hoyas.
