= 2026–27 Texas Longhorns men's basketball team =

American college basketball season

2026–27 Texas Longhorns men's basketball
- Conference: Southeastern Conference

Ranking
- Coaches: No. 6
- AP: No. 6
- Record: 5–0 (0–0 SEC)
- Head coach: Sean Miller (2nd season)
- Associate head coach: Kenya Hunter; Ulric Maligi (2nd season)
- Assistant coaches: Adam Cohen (2nd season); David Miller (2nd season); Ryan Anderson (2nd season)
- Home arena: Moody Center

2026–27 Southeastern Conference men's basketball standings
	Conf.				Overall
Team	W		L	PCT	W		L	PCT
Texas A&M	0	–	0	–	6	–	0	1.000
No. 16 Alabama	0	–	0	–	5	–	0	1.000
Georgia	0	–	0	–	5	–	0	1.000
No. 25 LSU	0	–	0	–	5	–	0	1.000
South Carolina	0	–	0	–	5	–	0	1.000
No. 6 Texas	0	–	0	–	5	–	0	1.000
No. 15 Vanderbilt	0	–	0	–	5	–	0	1.000
Ole Miss	0	–	0	–	4	–	0	1.000
No. 14 Tennessee	0	–	0	–	4	–	0	1.000
No. 1 Florida	0	–	0	–	6	–	1	.857
Kentucky	0	–	0	–	4	–	1	.800
Mississippi State	0	–	0	–	4	–	1	.800
Missouri	0	–	0	–	4	–	1	.800
Oklahoma	0	–	0	–	4	–	1	.800
No. 20 Arkansas	0	–	0	–	3	–	2	.600
Auburn	0	–	0	–	3	–	3	.500
† 2027 SEC tournament winner As of November 20, 2026; Rankings from AP poll

The 2026–27 Texas Longhorns men's basketball team represents the University of Texas at Austin in the 2026–27 NCAA Division I men's basketball season. They play their home games at the Moody Center in Austin, Texas, as third-year members of the Southeastern Conference. The Longhorns are led by second-year head coach Sean Miller.

== Previous season ==
The Longhorns finished the 2025–26 season 21–15, 9–9 in SEC play to finish in 10th place. As the No. 10 seed in the SEC tournament, they lost to Ole Miss 66–76 in the first round. They received an at-large bid to the NCAA tournament as a No. 11 seed in the West region. They defeated No. 11 seed NC State 68–66 in the First Four, advancing to the regular 64-team bracket. There, they defeated No. 6 seed BYU 79–71 in the first round and No. 3 seed Gonzaga 74–68 in the second round to advance to the Sweet Sixteen, where they lost to No. 2 seed Purdue 77–79. Texas became the sixth team to start in the First Four and reach the Sweet 16 since the First Four began in 2011.

== Offseason ==
=== Returning players ===
Texas returners
Name	Number	Pos.	Height	Weight	Year	Hometown
Matas Vokietaitis	8	C	7'0"	255 lbs	Junior	Marijampole, Lithuania
John Clark	9	F	6'9"	245 lbs	Redshirt freshman	Houston, Texas
Lewis Obiorah	14	C	7'1"	255 lbs	Redshirt freshman	London, England
Anthon McDermott	33	G	6'5"	200 lbs	Redshirt sophomore	Longview, Texas

=== Departures ===
Texas departures
Name	Number	Pos.	Height	Weight	Year	Hometown	Reason for departure
Jordan Pope	0	G	6'1"	180	Senior	Oakley, California	Transferred to Texas A&M
Cole Bott	1	F	6'6"	200	Graduate student	Highlands Ranch, Colorado	Graduated
Chendall Weaver	2	G	6'3"	180	Senior	Arlington, Texas	Transferred to Houston
Dailyn Swain	3	G/F	6'8"	225	Junior	Columbus, Ohio	Declared for 2026 NBA draft; selected 15th overall by Chicago Bulls
Declan Duru Jr.	4	F	6'8"	235	Freshman	Munich, Germany	Transferred to UC Santa Barbara
Camden Heide	5	F	6'7"	215	Junior	Wayzata, Minnesota	Transferred to South Carolina
Simeon Wilcher	7	G	6'4"	200	Junior	Plainfield, New Jersey	Transferred to Seton Hall
Nic Codie	10	F	6'8"	220	Sophomore	Dallas, Texas	Transferred to SMU
Tramon Mark	12	G	6'5"	210	Graduate student	Dickinson, Texas	Signed with Phoenix Suns
Lassina Traore	23	F	6'9"	245	Graduate student	Abidjan, Ivory Coast	Graduated
Brandon Taylor	44	G	5'10"	175	Graduate student	Coppell, Texas	Graduated

=== Acquisitions ===
==== Incoming transfers ====
Texas incoming transfers
Name	Number	Pos.	Height	Weight	Year	Hometown	Previous school	Source
Mikey Lewis	0	G	6'3"	195	Junior	Oakland, California	Saint Mary's	
Amari Evans	1	G	6'5"	220	Sophomore	Pittsburgh, Pennsylvania	Tennessee	
Isaiah Johnson	2	G	6'2"	182	Sophomore	Los Angeles, California	Colorado	
Elyjah Freeman	6	G/F	6'8"	205	Junior	Palm Beach, Florida	Auburn	
David Punch	13	F	6'7"	245	Junior	Harker Heights, Texas	TCU	

==== 2026 recruiting class ====
College recruiting
Name	Hometown	School	Height	Weight	Commit date
Marcus Spears Jr. F	Plano, Texas	Dynamic Prep	6 ft 9 in (2.06 m)	210 lb (95 kg)	Jul 9, 2026
Marcus Spears Jr. F	Recruit ratings: Rivals: 247Sports: ESPN: (94)				
Austin Goosby; F	Melissa, Texas	Dynamic Prep	6 ft 5 in (1.96 m)	185 lb (84 kg)	Nov 17, 2025
Austin Goosby; F	Recruit ratings: Rivals: 247Sports: ESPN: (90)				
Bo Ogden; F	Austin, Texas	Westlake	6 ft 5 in (1.96 m)	190 lb (86 kg)	Sep 30, 2025
Bo Ogden; F	Recruit ratings: Rivals: 247Sports: ESPN: (87)				
Joe Sterling; G	Encino, California	Harvard-Westlake	6 ft 4 in (1.93 m)	180 lb (82 kg)	Oct 30, 2025
Joe Sterling; G	Recruit ratings: Rivals: 247Sports: ESPN: (82)				
Coleman Elkins; C	Austin, Texas	Blair Academy (NJ)	6 ft 10 in (2.08 m)	230 lb (100 kg)	Oct 30, 2025
Coleman Elkins; C	Recruit ratings: Rivals: ESPN: (78)				
Mantas Laurencikas; G	Kaunas, Lithuania	AS Monaco (France)	6 ft 3 in (1.91 m)	N/A	May 15, 2026
Mantas Laurencikas; G	Recruit ratings: No ratings found				
Overall recruit ranking: Rivals: 6th 247Sports: 5th ESPN: —
Note: In many cases, Scout, Rivals, 247Sports, On3, and ESPN may conflict in their listings of height and weight.; In these cases, the average was taken. ESPN grades are on a 100-point scale.; Sources: "Texas 2026 Basketball Commitments". Rivals.; "2026 Texas Longhorns Recruiting Class". ESPN.; "2026 Team Ranking". Rivals.

2026 overall class rankings

Website	National rank	Conference rank	5-star recruits	4-star recruits	Total
ESPN	--	--	2	2	6
On3 Rivals	6th	3rd	1	2	6
247 Sports	5th	2nd	2	2	6

== Roster ==
2026–27 Texas Longhorns men's basketball team
Players
Coaches

Pos.	#	Name	Height	Weight	Year	Previous school	Hometown
G	0	Mikey Lewis	6 ft 3 in (1.91 m)	195 lb (88 kg)	Jr	Saint Mary's	Oakley, California
G	1	Amari Evans	6 ft 5 in (1.96 m)	220 lb (100 kg)	So	Tennessee	Pittsburgh, Pennsylvania
G	2	Isaiah Johnson	6 ft 2 in (1.88 m)	182 lb (83 kg)	So	Colorado	Los Angeles, California
G	3	Joe Sterling	6 ft 4 in (1.93 m)	205 lb (93 kg)	Fr	Harvard-Westlake	Los Angeles, California
F	4	Coleman Elkins	6 ft 11 in (2.11 m)	235 lb (107 kg)	Fr	Blair Academy (NJ)	Austin, Texas
G	5	Bo Ogden	6 ft 6 in (1.98 m)	215 lb (98 kg)	Fr	Westlake HS	Austin, Texas
G/F	6	Elyjah Freeman	6 ft 8 in (2.03 m)	205 lb (93 kg)	Jr	Auburn	Palm Beach, Florida
C	8	Matas Vokietaitis	7 ft 0 in (2.13 m)	255 lb (116 kg)	Jr	FAU	Marijampolė, Lithuania
F	9	John Clark	6 ft 9 in (2.06 m)	245 lb (111 kg)	RS Fr	Link Academy (MO)	Houston, Texas
G	10	Austin Goosby	6 ft 5 in (1.96 m)	205 lb (93 kg)	Fr	Dynamic Prep (TX)	Melissa, Texas
F	13	David Punch	6 ft 7 in (2.01 m)	245 lb (111 kg)	Jr	TCU	Harker Heights, Texas
C	14	Lewis Obiorah	7 ft 1 in (2.16 m)	255 lb (116 kg)	RS Fr	Barking Abbey Basketball Academy	London, England
G	25	Mantas Laurencikas	6 ft 4 in (1.93 m)	210 lb (95 kg)	Fr	AS Monaco Basket	Kaunas, Lithuania
F	31	Marcus Spears Jr.	6 ft 9 in (2.06 m)	206 lb (93 kg)	Fr	Dynamic Prep (TX)	Plano, Texas
G	33	Anthon McDermott	6 ft 5 in (1.96 m)	200 lb (91 kg)	RS So	Hallsville HS	Longview, Texas

Head coach

- Sean Miller (Pittsburgh)

Assistant coach(es)

- Kenya Hunter (Duquesne)
- Ulric Maligi (Howard)
- Adam Cohen (Arizona)
- David Miller (Arizona)
- Ryan Anderson (Arizona)

Legend

- (C) Team captain
- (S) Suspended
- (I) Ineligible
- (W) Walk-on
- Injured
- Current redshirt

Roster
Last update: October 19, 2026

== Schedule and results ==
Date time, TV	Rank^{#}	Opponent^{#}	Result	Record	High points	High rebounds	High assists	Site (attendance) city, state
Exhibition game
October 25, 2026*; 11:00 a.m., MSG Network/ESPN+	No. 7	No. 13 St. John's	L 74–87		18 – Johnson	7 – Punch	4 – Johnson	Madison Square Garden (11,011); New York City, New York
Non-conference regular season
November 2, 2026*; 8:00 p.m., SECN	No. 7	Chicago State	W 109–59	1–0	22 – Vokietaitis	7 – Tied	8 – Goosby	Moody Center (10,892); Austin, Texas
November 5, 2026*; 7:00 p.m., SECN+	No. 7	Gardner–Webb	W 98–50	2–0	16 – Vokietaitis	7 – Vokietaitis	4 – Tied	Moody Center (10,807); Austin, Texas
November 9, 2026*; 6:00 p.m., ESPN+	No. 7	Grambling State	W 93–62	3–0	26 – Vokietaitis	9 – Vokietaitis	4 – Johnson	Moody Center (10,872); Austin, Texas
November 15, 2026*; 2:00 p.m., ESPN	No. 7	vs. Baylor; San Antonio Hoops Showdown	W 75–72	4–0	26 – Johnson	10 – Vokietaitis	7 – Goosby	Frost Bank Center (6,164); San Antonio, Texas
November 19, 2026*; 7:00 p.m., SECN+	No. 6	Southern Utah	W 92–68	5–0	26 – Vokietaitis	11 – Vokietaitis	6 – Johnson	Moody Center (10,399); Austin, Texas
November 22, 2026*; 2:00 p.m., SECN+	No. 6	Southern Indiana						Moody Center; Austin, Texas
November 26, 2026*; 1:30 p.m., FS1		vs. Georgetown; Rady Children's Invitational Semifinal						Jenny Craig Pavilion; San Diego, California
November 27, 2026*; 1:30 p.m. OR 4:00 p.m., FOX		vs. Saint Mary's OR UCLA; Rady Children's Invitational						Jenny Craig Pavilion; San Diego, California
December 1, 2026*; 8:00 p.m., ESPN2		at Louisville; ACC–SEC Challenge						KFC Yum! Center; Louisville, Kentucky
December 8, 2026*; 7:00 p.m., SECN+		Jackson State						Moody Center; Austin, Texas
December 12, 2026*; 4:30 p.m., ESPN+		vs. Miami; Houston Hoopfest						Toyota Center; Houston, Texas
December 16, 2026*; 8:00 p.m., ESPN2		Memphis						Moody Center; Austin, Texas
December 21, 2026*; 7:00 p.m., SECN+		Prairie View A&M						Moody Center; Austin, Texas
December 29, 2026*; 7:00 p.m., SECN+		East Texas A&M						Moody Center; Austin, Texas
SEC regular season
January 2, 2027; 5:00 p.m., ESPN/ESPN2		Florida						Moody Center; Austin, Texas
January 5, 2027; 8:00 p.m., ESPN/ESPNU		at Georgia						Stegeman Coliseum; Athens, Georgia
January 9, 2027; 11:00 a.m., ESPNU		at Ole Miss						SJB Pavilion; Oxford, Mississippi
January 12, 2027; 8:00 p.m., ESPN/ESPN2		Auburn						Moody Center; Austin, Texas
January 16, 2027; 11:00 a.m., ESPN/ESPN2		Oklahoma						Moody Center; Austin, Texas
January 19, 2027; 8:00 p.m., SECN		at LSU						Pete Maravich Assembly Center; Baton Rouge, Louisiana
January 23, 2027; 5:00 p.m., ESPN/ESPN2/ESPNU		Arkansas						Moody Center; Austin, Texas
January 27, 2027; 7:00 p.m., SECN		at Sourh Carolina						Colonial Life Arena; Columbia, South Carolina
January 30, 2027; 11:00 a.m., ESPN/ESPN2		Kentucky						Moody Center; Austin, Texas
February 6, 2027; 11:00 a.m., ESPN		at Florida						O'Connell Center; Gainesville, Florida
February 9, 2027; 6:00 p.m., ESPN		Alabama						Moody Center; Austin, Texas
February 13, 2027; 1:00 p.m., ESPN/ESPN2		at Vanderbilt						Memorial Gymnasium; Nashville, Tennessee
February 17, 2027; 8:00 p.m., ESPN2/ESPNU		Texas A&M; Lone Star Showdown						Moody Center; Austin, Texas
February 20, 2027; 7:30 p.m., ESPN		at Oklahoma						Lloyd Noble Center; Norman, Oklahoma
February 24, 2027; 6:00 p.m., ESPN2/ESPNU		at Mississippi State						Humphrey Coliseum; Starkville, Mississippi
February 27, 2027; 5 p.m. / 5:30 p.m., ESPN/ESPN2		Tennessee						Moody Center; Austin, Texas
March 2, 2027; 6:00 p.m., ESPN/ESPN2/ESPNU		Missouri						Moody Center; Austin, Texas
March 6, 2027; 7:00 p.m., SECN		at Texas A&M; Lone Star Showdown						Reed Arena; College Station, Texas
*Non-conference game. ^{#}Rankings from AP poll. (#) Tournament seedings in parentheses. W=West. All times are in Central Time.

== Rankings ==
Ranking movements Legend: ██ Increase in ranking ██ Decrease in ranking
	Week																				
Poll	Pre	1	2	3	4	5	6	7	8	9	10	11	12	13	14	15	16	17	18	19	Final
AP	7	7	6																		
Coaches	7	7	6																		
