= 2026–27 Florida State Seminoles men's basketball team =

American college basketball season

2026–27 Florida State Seminoles men's basketball
- Conference: Atlantic Coast Conference
- Record: 5–1 (0–0 ACC)
- Head coach: Luke Loucks (2nd season)
- Associate head coach: Jim Moran (2nd season)
- Assistant coaches: Michael Fly (2nd season); Gerald Gillion (2nd season); Derwin Kitchen (2nd season); Kyle Washington (1st season); Justin Lindner (1st season)
- Home arena: Donald L. Tucker Center

2026–27 ACC men's basketball standings
	Conf.				Overall
Team	W		L	PCT	W		L	PCT
No. 4 Virginia	0	–	0	–	6	–	0	1.000
Boston College	0	–	0	–	5	–	0	1.000
Georgia Tech	0	–	0	–	5	–	0	1.000
NC State	0	–	0	–	5	–	0	1.000
Pittsburgh	0	–	0	–	5	–	0	1.000
SMU	0	–	0	–	5	–	0	1.000
Virginia Tech	0	–	0	–	5	–	0	1.000
Notre Dame	0	–	0	–	6	–	1	.857
Stanford	0	–	0	–	5	–	1	.833
Clemson	0	–	0	–	4	–	1	.800
Florida State	0	–	0	–	4	–	1	.800
No. 17 Miami (FL)	0	–	0	–	4	–	1	.800
Wake Forest	0	–	0	–	4	–	1	.800
No. 23 Louisville	0	–	0	–	3	–	1	.750
North Carolina	0	–	0	–	3	–	1	.750
California	0	–	0	–	4	–	2	.667
No. 5 Duke	0	–	0	–	3	–	2	.600
Syracuse	0	–	0	–	3	–	2	.600
† 2027 ACC tournament winner As of November 20, 2026; Rankings from AP poll

The 2026–27 Florida State Seminoles men's basketball team represents Florida State University during the 2026–27 NCAA Division I men's basketball season. The Seminoles are led by head coach Luke Loucks, in his second season. The Seminoles play their home games at the Donald L. Tucker Center on the university's Tallahassee, Florida campus as members of the Atlantic Coast Conference. The 2026–27 season is the 80th season of the program.

Loucks rebuilt the roster for his second season, adding thirteen newcomers, eight of them freshmen. Forwards AJ Swinton, who tore a knee ligament in March 2026, and Alex Steen returned. Steen sued the NCAA in August 2026 seeking a fifth year of eligibility and received it through a court ruling. The Seminoles were picked to finish seventh in the ACC's preseason media poll. Freshman center Marcis Ponder was named to the preseason watch list for the Kareem Abdul-Jabbar Award.

A scheduled exhibition against Mississippi State in Pensacola was canceled. The Seminoles won their two remaining exhibitions against SEC opponents, defeating Auburn 82–71 in Birmingham and LSU 89–87 in Tallahassee.

Florida State opened the regular season with a 113–69 win over Florida A&M in the Orion180 Tip-Off Classic in Tampa, in which Sebastian Rancik scored a career-high 25 points and Ponder recorded his first career double-double. They followed with a 91–68 win over Troy in their home opener. The Seminoles then had their first loss of the season, 81–72, to top-ranked rival Florida, before rebounding with wins over Texas A&M–Corpus Christi, Ball State., and Green Bay.

== Previous season ==
The Seminoles finished the 2025–26 season 18–15 overall and 10–8 in ACC play to finish in a tie for seventh place. After a 0–5 start to conference play, they won ten of their final thirteen games. As the eighth seed in the 2026 ACC tournament, they defeated ninth-seed California in the Second Round before losing to top seed Duke 80–79 in the Quarterfinals. Florida State declined a bid to participate in the NIT.

== Offseason ==
=== Coaching changes ===
Assistant coach Chris Kent left the program after one season to become head coach of the Austin Spurs of the NBA G League. In September 2026, Loucks promoted Kyle Washington, previously the director of video and scouting, and Justin Lindner, previously the assistant director of player development, to assistant coach positions.

=== Departures ===
Florida State Departures
Name	Number	Pos.	Height	Weight	Year	Hometown	Reason for Departure
Maximo Garcia-Plata	0	G	6'4"	180	Freshman	Madrid, Spain	Transferred to Incarnate Word
Martin Somerville	1	G	6'3"	185	Sophomore	Bowie, Maryland	Transferred to West Virginia
Cam Miles	2	G	6'2"	170	Freshman	Chicago, Illinois	Transferred to UNLV
Thomas Bassong	3	F	6'8"	203	Freshman	Paris, France	Transferred to Mississippi State
Shahid Muhammad	4	F	6'11"	200	Junior	Queens, New York	Entered transfer portal
Kobe MaGee	5	G	6'5"	207	Senior	Allentown, Pennsylvania	Graduated
Robert McCray V	6	G	6'4"	188	Senior	Columbia, South Carolina	Graduated
Chauncey Wiggins	7	F	6'10"	225	Senior	Atlanta, Georgia	Transferred to Gonzaga
Lajae Jones	10	G	6'7"	220	Senior	Neptune Beach, Florida	Graduated; drafted 54th overall in the 2026 NBA draft
Xavier Osceola	11	G	6'1"	175	Freshman	Hollywood, Florida	Entered transfer portal
Alier Maluk	12	F	6'11"	220	Sophomore	Baldwin, Pennsylvania	Transferred to McNeese

=== Incoming transfers ===
Florida State incoming transfers
Name	Number	Pos.	Height	Weight	Year	Hometown	Previous School
Shon Abaev	1	F	6'8"	215	Sophomore	Fort Lauderdale, Florida	Cincinnati
Anthony Robinson II	2	G	6'3"	190	Senior	Tallahassee, Florida	Missouri
Kam Taylor	3	G	6'7"	195	Junior	Charlotte, North Carolina	UNC Asheville
Amare Robinson	8	G	6'1"	170	Sophomore	Tallahassee, Florida	Tallahassee State College
Sebastian Rancik	22	F	6'11"	230	Junior	Bratislava, Slovakia	Colorado
Cooper Schwieger	31	F	6'10"	235	Senior	Overland Park, Kansas	Wake Forest

=== 2026 Recruiting class ===
College recruiting
Name	Hometown	School	Height	Weight	Commit date
Marcis Ponder; C	Miami, Florida	Gillion Basketball Academy (VA)	7 ft 0 in (2.13 m)	285 lb (129 kg)	Jul 29, 2025
Marcis Ponder; C	Recruit ratings: Rivals: 247Sports: ESPN: (87)				
Collin Paul; SF	West Palm Beach, Florida	Calvary Christian Academy	6 ft 8 in (2.03 m)	240 lb (110 kg)	Sep 3, 2025
Collin Paul; SF	Recruit ratings: Rivals: 247Sports: ESPN: (82)				
Brandon Bass Jr. CG	Windermere, Florida	Windermere Preparatory School	6 ft 5 in (1.96 m)	200 lb (91 kg)	Sep 4, 2025
Brandon Bass Jr. CG	Recruit ratings: Rivals: 247Sports: ESPN: (82)				
Martay Barnes; CG	Palm Bay, Florida	The Academy of Central Florida	6 ft 2 in (1.88 m)	175 lb (79 kg)	
Martay Barnes; CG	Recruit ratings: Rivals: 247Sports: ESPN: (85)				
Elisèe Assui; G	Varese, Italy	Istituto Giuseppe Nasta / Pallacanestro Varese	6 ft 5 in (1.96 m)	230 lb (100 kg)	Apr 22, 2026
Elisèe Assui; G	Recruit ratings: Scout: Rivals: 247Sports: ESPN: (NR)				
Jasen Lopez; G	Miami, Florida	Chaminade-Madonna Prep	6 ft 0 in (1.83 m)	180 lb (82 kg)	
Jasen Lopez; G	Recruit ratings: 247Sports: ESPN: (79)				
JD Jones; G	Phoenix, Arizona	Phoenix Country Day School	6 ft 5 in (1.96 m)	210 lb (95 kg)	
JD Jones; G	Recruit ratings: Scout: Rivals: 247Sports: ESPN: (NR)				
Overall recruit ranking: 247Sports: 19
Note: In many cases, Scout, Rivals, 247Sports, On3, and ESPN may conflict in their listings of height and weight.; In these cases, the average was taken. ESPN grades are on a 100-point scale.; Sources: "Florida State Seminoles". ESPN.; "2026 Team Ranking". Rivals.

2026 overall class rankings

Website	National rank	Conference rank	5-star recruits	4-star recruits	Total
247 Sports	19		0	4	8
ESPN			0	4	5

== Roster ==
2026–27 Florida State Seminoles men's basketball team
Players
Coaches

Pos.	#	Name	Height	Weight	Year	Previous school	Hometown
G	0	Martay Barnes	6 ft 2 in (1.88 m)	175 lb (79 kg)	Fr	The Academy of Central Florida	Palm Bay, FL
F	1	Shon Abaev	6 ft 8 in (2.03 m)	215 lb (98 kg)	So	Calvary Christian Academy; Cincinnati	Fort Lauderdale, FL
G	2	Anthony Robinson II	6 ft 3 in (1.91 m)	190 lb (86 kg)	Sr	Florida State University School; Missouri	Tallahassee, FL
G	3	Kam Taylor	6 ft 7 in (2.01 m)	195 lb (88 kg)	Jr	Carmel Christian School; UNC Asheville	Charlotte, NC
F	5	Collin Paul	6 ft 8 in (2.03 m)	240 lb (109 kg)	Fr	Calvary Christian Academy	West Palm Beach, FL
G	7	Jasen Lopez	6 ft 0 in (1.83 m)	180 lb (82 kg)	So	Chaminade-Madonna Prep	Miami, FL
G	8	Amare Robinson	6 ft 1 in (1.85 m)	170 lb (77 kg)	So	Florida State University School; Tallahassee State College	Tallahassee, FL
G	10	Elisèe Assui	6 ft 5 in (1.96 m)	230 lb (104 kg)	Fr	Istituto Giuseppe Nasta	Varese, Italy
C	11	Marcis Ponder	7 ft 0 in (2.13 m)	285 lb (129 kg)	Fr	Gillion Basketball Academy (VA)	Miami, FL
G	14	JD Jones	6 ft 5 in (1.96 m)	210 lb (95 kg)	Fr	Phoenix Country Day School	Phoenix, AZ
G	15	Jalen Crawford	6 ft 0 in (1.83 m)	160 lb (73 kg)	Jr	Maclay School	Tallahassee, FL
F	19	AJ Swinton	6 ft 6 in (1.98 m)	220 lb (100 kg)	Jr	Bishop O'Connell	Cabin John, MD
F	22	Sebastian Rancik	6 ft 11 in (2.11 m)	230 lb (104 kg)	Jr	JSerra Catholic; Colorado	Bratislava, Slovakia
F	25	Alex Steen	6 ft 9 in (2.06 m)	230 lb (104 kg)	GS	Arnold; Florida Southern	Panama City Beach, FL
G	30	Brandon Bass Jr.	6 ft 5 in (1.96 m)	200 lb (91 kg)	Fr	Windermere Prep	Windermere, FL
F	31	Cooper Schwieger	6 ft 10 in (2.08 m)	235 lb (107 kg)	Sr	Blue Valley Southwest; Wake Forest	Overland Park, KS

Head coach

- Luke Loucks (Florida State)

Assistant coach(es)

- Jim Moran (William & Mary)
- Michael Fly (Kentucky)
- Gerald Gillion (Florida State)
- Derwin Kitchen (Florida State)
- Kyle Washington
- Justin Lindner (Florida State)

Legend

- (C) Team captain
- (S) Suspended
- (I) Ineligible
- (W) Walk-on
- Injured
- Current redshirt

Roster

== Schedule and results ==
Date time, TV	Rank^{#}	Opponent^{#}	Result	Record	High points	High rebounds	High assists	Site (attendance) city, state
Exhibition
October 10, 2026*; 6:00 p.m.		vs. Mississippi State; Southern Tip-Off	Canceled					Pensacola Bay Center; Pensacola, FL
October 14, 2026*; 8:00 p.m.		vs. Auburn; Ballin in Boutwell	W 82–71	–	19 – Taylor	21 – Ponder	–	Boutwell Auditorium; Birmingham, AL
October 24, 2026*; 1:00 p.m.		LSU	W 89–87	–	26 – Abaev	–	–	Donald L. Tucker Center; Tallahassee, FL
Non-conference regular season
November 2, 2026*; 8:30 p.m., ESPNU		vs. Florida A&M; Orion180 Tip-Off Classic	W 113–69	1–0	25 – Rancik	11 – Ponder	6 – Abaev	Benchmark International Arena; Tampa, FL
November 6, 2026*; 7:00 p.m., ACCNX		Troy	W 91–68	2–0	20 – Abaev	10 – Ponder	6 – Abaev	Donald L. Tucker Center (7,488); Tallahassee, FL
November 10, 2026*; 6:00 p.m., ESPN2		No. 1 Florida; Sunshine Showdown	L 72–81	2–1	23 – Rancik	6 – Abaev	3 – Robinson II	Donald L. Tucker Center (11,500); Tallahassee, FL
November 13, 2026*; 5:00 p.m., ACCNX		Texas A&M–Corpus Christi	W 84–60	3–1	17 – Rancik	9 – Assui, Ponder	4 – Robinson II	Donald L. Tucker Center (5,553); Tallahassee, FL
November 17, 2026*; 7:00 p.m., ACCNX		Ball State	W 85–71	4–1	18 – Rancik	16 – Ponder	4 – Abaev, Taylor	Donald L. Tucker Center (5,033); Tallahassee, FL
November 20, 2026*; 12:00 p.m., ACCNX		Green Bay	W 87–63	5–1	24 – Abaev, Rancik	7 – Robinson II	3 – Abaev, Rancik, Robinson II	Donald L. Tucker Center (2,485); Tallahassee, FL
November 24, 2026*; 9:00 p.m., ACCN		UNC Asheville						Donald L. Tucker Center; Tallahassee, FL
November 29, 2026*; 3:00 p.m., ACCNX		vs. West Florida; Battle at the Bay						Pensacola Bay Center; Pensacola, FL
December 1, 2026*; 7:00 p.m., ESPN2		at Tennessee; ACC–SEC Challenge						Food City Center; Knoxville, TN
December 5, 2026*; 12:00 p.m., The CW		Dayton						Donald L. Tucker Center; Tallahassee, FL
December 12, 2026*; 3:00 p.m., ESPNU		vs. Texas A&M; Houston Hoopfest						Toyota Center; Houston, TX
December 16, 2026*; 7:00 p.m., ACCN		Jacksonville						Donald L. Tucker Center; Tallahassee, FL
December 20, 2026*; 1:00 p.m., ESPN/2		vs. Houston; Jacksonville Hoops Showdown						VyStar Veterans Memorial Arena; Jacksonville, FL
December 22, 2026*; 6:00 p.m., ACCN		Bethune–Cookman						Donald L. Tucker Center; Tallahassee, FL
ACC regular season
December 29, 2026; 6:00 p.m., ACCN		Syracuse						Donald L. Tucker Center; Tallahassee, FL
January 6, 2027; 9:00 p.m., ESPNU		at California						Haas Pavilion; Berkeley, CA
January 9, 2027; 5:30 p.m., ACCN		at Stanford						Maples Pavilion; Stanford, CA
January 13, 2027; 7:00 p.m., ESPN2/U		North Carolina						Donald L. Tucker Center; Tallahassee, FL
January 16, 2027; 4:30 p.m., ACCN		at Wake Forest						Lawrence Joel Veterans Memorial Coliseum; Winston-Salem, NC
January 20, 2027; 7:00 p.m., ACCN		Virginia Tech						Donald L. Tucker Center; Tallahassee, FL
January 23, 2027; 12:00 p.m., ESPN/2/U		at Clemson						Littlejohn Coliseum; Clemson, SC
January 26, 2027; 7:00 p.m., ACCN		Notre Dame						Donald L. Tucker Center; Tallahassee, FL
January 30, 2027; 3:00 p.m., ACCN		Pittsburgh						Donald L. Tucker Center; Tallahassee, FL
February 3, 2027; 6:00 p.m., ESPN2/U		at NC State						Lenovo Center; Raleigh, NC
February 6, 2027; 2:00 p.m., ESPN/2		at Miami (FL); Rivalry						Watsco Center; Coral Gables, FL
February 13, 2027; 3:15 p.m., The CW		Clemson						Donald L. Tucker Center; Tallahassee, FL
February 16, 2027; 7:00 p.m., ESPN/2		at Duke						Cameron Indoor Stadium; Durham, NC
February 21, 2027; 4:00 p.m., ESPN/2		Louisville						Donald L. Tucker Center; Tallahassee, FL
February 23, 2027; 6:00 p.m., ACCN		Georgia Tech						Donald L. Tucker Center; Tallahassee, FL
February 27, 2027; 2:00 p.m., ESPN/2		at Virginia						John Paul Jones Arena; Charlottesville, VA
March 3, 2027; 6:30 p.m., ACCN		at Boston College						Conte Forum; Chestnut Hill, MA
March 6, 2027; 2:00 p.m., ESPN/U		Miami (FL); Rivalry						Donald L. Tucker Center; Tallahassee, FL
ACC Tournament
March 9–13, 2027; TBA		vs. TBD						First Horizon Coliseum; Greensboro, NC
*Non-conference game. ^{#}Rankings from AP poll. (#) Tournament seedings in parentheses. All times are in Eastern Time.

== Rankings ==
Ranking movements Legend: — = Not ranked
	Week																				
Poll	Pre	1	2	3	4	5	6	7	8	9	10	11	12	13	14	15	16	17	18	19	Final
AP	—	—	—																		
Coaches	—	—	—																		

== Honors ==
Honors
Player	Award	Ref.
Marcis Ponder	Kareem Abdul-Jabbar Award preseason watch list ACC Rooke of the Week	
