= 2026–27 Arkansas Razorbacks men's basketball team =

American college basketball season

2026–27 Arkansas Razorbacks men's basketball
- Conference: Southeastern Conference

Ranking
- Coaches: No. 23
- AP: No. 20
- Record: 4–2 (0–0 SEC)
- Head coach: John Calipari (3rd season)
- Associate head coach: Ronald Coleman (3rd season); Kenny Payne (3rd season)
- Assistant coach: Brad Calipari (3rd season)
- Home arena: Bud Walton Arena (Capacity: 19,368)

2026–27 Southeastern Conference men's basketball standings
	Conf.				Overall
Team	W		L	PCT	W		L	PCT
Texas A&M	0	–	0	–	6	–	0	1.000
No. 16 Alabama	0	–	0	–	5	–	0	1.000
Georgia	0	–	0	–	5	–	0	1.000
No. 25 LSU	0	–	0	–	5	–	0	1.000
South Carolina	0	–	0	–	5	–	0	1.000
No. 6 Texas	0	–	0	–	5	–	0	1.000
No. 15 Vanderbilt	0	–	0	–	5	–	0	1.000
Ole Miss	0	–	0	–	4	–	0	1.000
No. 14 Tennessee	0	–	0	–	4	–	0	1.000
No. 1 Florida	0	–	0	–	6	–	1	.857
Kentucky	0	–	0	–	4	–	1	.800
Mississippi State	0	–	0	–	4	–	1	.800
Missouri	0	–	0	–	4	–	1	.800
Oklahoma	0	–	0	–	4	–	1	.800
No. 20 Arkansas	0	–	0	–	3	–	2	.600
Auburn	0	–	0	–	3	–	3	.500
† 2027 SEC tournament winner As of November 21, 2026; Rankings from AP poll

The 2026–27 Arkansas Razorbacks men's basketball team will represent the University of Arkansas during the 2026–27 season. The Razorbacks will be led by third year head coach John Calipari, and play their home games at Bud Walton Arena in Fayetteville, Arkansas as a member of the Southeastern Conference.

== Previous season ==
Arkansas finished John Calipari's second season with a record of 28-9 and ranked No. 15. The Razorbacks won the SEC Tournament championship for only the second time (their first since 2000), and made it to the Sweet 16 for the second consecutive season.

Freshman guard Darius Acuff would earn SEC Freshman of the Year and SEC Player of the Year honors, and would be named a first team All-American, which had not happened since Sidney Moncrief earned first team honors in 1979.

Acuff was drafted with the seventh overall pick in the NBA Draft by the Sacramento Kings. Teammates Meleek Thomas and Trevon Brazile were also drafted by the Cleveland Cavaliers and Denver Nuggets, respectively.

== Offseason ==
=== 2026 Recruiting Class ===
As of May 20, 2026, Arkansas has signed all 4 players to their 2026 recruiting class. Shooting guard/small forward JJ Andrews, the son of former NFL offensive lineman Shawn Andrews, is the No. 1 player in Arkansas and a 5-star recruit. He was named a McDonald's All-American. Arkansas also signed small forward Abdou Toure, a high 4 star recruit and Top 50 player nationally, who is also the #1 player in Connecticut. 7'0" power forward Miikka Muurinen, a 5-star player, signed with Arkansas on May 19, and 5 star combo guard Jordan Smith Jr, who is also a McDonald's All-American, signed on May 20. Arkansas has the top class on 247Sports, the No. 2 class on Rivals/On3 (just behind Duke), and No. 1 on ESPN.

College recruiting
Name	Hometown	School	Height	Weight	Commit date
Jordan Smith Jr. SG	Washington, DC	Paul VI Catholic (VA)	6 ft 3 in (1.91 m)	195 lb (88 kg)	Feb 13, 2026
Jordan Smith Jr. SG	Recruit ratings: Rivals: 247Sports: ESPN: (98)				
Miikka Muurinen; PF	Järvenpää, Finland	Partizan Belgrade	7 ft 0 in (2.13 m)	220 lb (100 kg)	Apr 27, 2026
Miikka Muurinen; PF	Recruit ratings: Rivals: 247Sports: ESPN: (95)				
JJ Andrews; SF	Little Rock, AR	Little Rock Christian	6 ft 7 in (2.01 m)	220 lb (100 kg)	May 5, 2025
JJ Andrews; SF	Recruit ratings: Rivals: 247Sports: On3: ESPN: (93)				
Abdou Toure; SF	West Haven, CT	Notre Dame High	6 ft 6 in (1.98 m)	200 lb (91 kg)	Oct 3, 2025
Abdou Toure; SF	Recruit ratings: Rivals: 247Sports: On3: ESPN: (88)				
Overall recruit ranking: Rivals: 2 247Sports: 2 On3: 1 ESPN: 1
Note: In many cases, Scout, Rivals, 247Sports, On3, and ESPN may conflict in their listings of height and weight.; In these cases, the average was taken. ESPN grades are on a 100-point scale.; Sources: "Arkansas 2026 Basketball Commitments". Rivals.; "2026 Team Ranking". Rivals.

== Roster ==
2026–27 Arkansas Razorbacks men's basketball team
Players
Coaches

Pos.	#	Name	Height	Weight	Year	Previous school	Hometown
F	0	Caleb Ourigou	6 ft 11 in (2.11 m)	240 lb (109 kg)	Fr	Overtime Elite	New York City
G	1	Abdou Toure	6 ft 5 in (1.96 m)	185 lb (84 kg)	Fr	Notre Dame High School	West Haven, Connecticut
G	2	Amere Brown	5 ft 9 in (1.75 m)	180 lb (82 kg)	So	Woodland Hills High School	Pittsburgh, Pennsylvania
F	3	Miikka Muurinen	7 ft 0 in (2.13 m)	215 lb (98 kg)	Fr	KK Partizan	Järvenpää, Finland
G	4	Ayden Kelley	5 ft 10 in (1.78 m)	170 lb (77 kg)	Jr	Northpoint Christian School	Memphis, Tennessee
G	5	Jeremiah Wilkinson	6 ft 1 in (1.85 m)	185 lb (84 kg)	Jr	The Skill Factory	Powder Springs, Georgia
F	7	JJ Andrews	6 ft 6 in (1.98 m)	225 lb (102 kg)	Fr	Little Rock Christian Academy	Little Rock, Arkansas
F	8	Maper Maker	6 ft 6 in (1.98 m)	220 lb (100 kg)	Fr	AUNZ Prep	Perth, Australia
G	9	Davion Thompson	6 ft 2 in (1.88 m)	180 lb (82 kg)	Fr	Link Academy	Bolingbrook, Illinois
C	14	Ilia Frolov	7 ft 0 in (2.13 m)	225 lb (102 kg)	Fr	Real Madrid U22	Kursk, Russia
F	21	Cooper Bowser	6 ft 11 in (2.11 m)	225 lb (102 kg)	Sr	Furman	Woodbridge, Virginia
G	23	Jordan Smith Jr.	6 ft 2 in (1.88 m)	205 lb (93 kg)	Fr	Paul VI Catholic High School	Washington, D.C.
F	24	Billy Richmond III	6 ft 6 in (1.98 m)	205 lb (93 kg)	Jr	Camden High School	Memphis, Tennessee
F	30	Isaiah Sealy	6 ft 7 in (2.01 m)	195 lb (88 kg)	So	Springdale High School	Springdale, Arkansas
C	99	Paulo Semedo	7 ft 1 in (2.16 m)	225 lb (102 kg)	RS Fr	West Oaks Academy	Luanda, Angola

Head coach

- John Calipari (Clarion)

Assistant coach(es)

- Kenny Payne (Louisville)
- Ronald Coleman (Lamar)
- Brad Calipari (Kentucky)

Legend

- (C) Team captain
- (S) Suspended
- (I) Ineligible
- (W) Walk-on
- Injured
- Current redshirt

Roster
Last update: July 24, 2026

== Schedule and results ==
Date time, TV	Rank^{#}	Opponent^{#}	Result	Record	High points	High rebounds	High assists	Site (attendance) city, state
Baha Mar Hoops Summer League
July 31, 2026; 6:00 pm, NA		vs. Bahamas National Team	W 106–59		22 – Smith Jr.	10 – Toure	6 – Tied	Baha Mar Convention Center (787); Nassau, Bahamas
August 1, 2026; 5:00 pm, NA		vs. Carleton	W 98–58		26 – Wilkinson	11 – Smith Jr.	11 – Smith Jr.	Baha Mar Convention Center (637); Nassau, Bahamas
August 3, 2026; 5:00 pm, NA		vs. Toros del Valle	W 91–49		15 – Andrews	13 – Andrews	4 – Smith Jr.	Baha Mar Convention Center (817); Nassau, Bahamas
August 4, 2026; 11:00 am, NA		vs. Calgary	W 105–48		24 – Andrews	16 – Ourigou	9 – Wilkinson	Baha Mar Convention Center (697); Nassau, Bahamas
Exhibition
October 24, 2026; 3:00 pm, SECN+	No. 12	No. 15 Gonzaga	W 76–72		17 – Richmond III	10 – Bowser	5 – Richmond III	Bud Walton Arena (16,436); Fayetteville, AR
October 28, 2026; 7:00 pm, SECN+	No. 12	Memphis	W 93–81		17 – Tied	12 – Muurinen	3 – Tied	Bud Walton Arena (10,586); Fayetteville, AR
Non-conference regular season
November 3, 2026; 7:00 pm, SECN+	No. 12	Arkansas–Pine Bluff	W 106–61	1–0	23 – Wilkinson	8 – Maker	4 – Thompson	Bud Walton Arena (19,200); Fayetteville, AR
November 8, 2026; 12:00 pm, ESPN	No. 12	vs. No. 9 Virginia; Capital Showcase	L 72–91	1–1	19 – Smith Jr.	7 – Tied	4 – Richmond III	Capital One Arena (10,977); Washington, D.C.
November 11, 2026; 7:00 pm, SECN+	No. 19	Robert Morris	W 76–53	2–1	16 – Richmond III	10 – Bowser	7 – Thompson	Bud Walton Arena (19,200); Fayetteville, AR
November 13, 2026; 7:00 pm, SECN+	No. 19	Central Arkansas	W 79–66	3–1	21 – Richmond III	9 – Richmond III	8 – Thompson	Bud Walton Arena (19,200); Fayetteville, AR
November 17, 2026; 6:30 pm, NBCSN/Peacock	No. 20	vs. Indiana; The Bad Boy Mowers Series – New York	L 76–81	3–2	20 – Thompson	7 – Richmond III	8 – Thompson	Madison Square Garden (9,761); New York City, NY
November 20, 2026; 7:00 pm, SECN+	No. 20	Mississippi Valley State	W 92–48	4–2	28 – Wilkinson	7 – Muurinen	11 – Thompson	Bud Walton Arena (19,200); Fayetteville, AR
November 26, 2026; 3:30 pm, CBS		vs. Michigan State; CareSource Invitational						Little Caesars Arena; Detroit, MI
December 1, 2026; 6:30 pm, ESPN		at North Carolina; ACC–SEC Challenge						Dean Smith Center; Chapel Hill, NC
December 5, 2026; 3:00 pm, SECN+		vs. Oral Roberts						Simmons Bank Arena; North Little Rock, AR
December 8, 2026; 8:00 pm, SECN		Oakland						Bud Walton Arena; Fayetteville, AR
December 13, 2026; 4:00 pm, SECN+		UT Arlington						Bud Walton Arena; Fayetteville, AR
December 19, 2026; 5:30 pm, ESPN		vs. Arizona; Hall of Fame Series – Phoenix						Mortgage Matchup Center; Phoenix, Arizona
December 22, 2026; 6:00 pm, SECN+		Central Michigan						Bud Walton Arena; Fayetteville, AR
December 29, 2026; 7:00 pm, SECN+		UT Rio Grande Valley						Bud Walton Arena; Fayetteville, AR
SEC regular season
January 2, 2027; 3:00 pm, ESPN/ESPN2		Missouri						Bud Walton Arena; Fayetteville, AR
January 6, 2027; 6:00 pm, SECN		at South Carolina						Colonial Life Arena; Columbia, SC
January 9, 2027; 1:00 pm, ESPN2		Alabama						Bud Walton Arena; Fayetteville, AR
January 12, 2027; 6:00 pm, ESPN2/ESPNU		at Texas A&M						Reed Arena; College Station, TX
January 16, 2027; 11:00 am, ESPN/ESPN2		at Tennessee						Thompson–Boling Arena; Knoxville, TN
January 19, 2027; 8:00 pm, ESPNU		Georgia						Bud Walton Arena; Fayetteville, AR
January 23, 2027; 5:00 pm, ESPN/ESPN2/ESPNU		at Texas						Moody Center; Austin, TX
January 26, 2027; 8:00 pm, SECN		LSU						Bud Walton Arena; Fayetteville, AR
January 30, 2027; 7:30 pm, SECN		Mississippi State						Bud Walton Arena; Fayetteville, AR
February 6, 2027; 7:00/7:30 pm, ESPN		at Vanderbilt						Memorial Gymnasium; Nashville, TN
February 9, 2027; 7:30 pm, SECN		Ole Miss						Bud Walton Arena; Fayetteville, AR
February 13, 2027; 7:00 pm, ESPN2		at Alabama						Coleman Coliseum; Tuscaloosa, AL
February 16, 2027; 8:00 pm, ESPN/ESPN2		Auburn						Bud Walton Arena; Fayetteville, AR
February 20, 2027; 5:00/5:30 pm, ESPN		at Kentucky						Rupp Arena; Lexington, KY
February 23, 2027; 5:00/5:30 pm, ESPN2/ESPNU		at Missouri						Mizzou Arena; Columbia, MO
February 27, 2027; 2:00 pm, ABC		Florida						Bud Walton Arena; Fayetteville, AR
March 2, 2027; 8:00 pm, ESPN2/ESPNU		at LSU						Pete Maravich Assembly Center; Baton Rouge, LA
March 6, 2027; 11:00 am, ESPN/ESPNU		Oklahoma						Bud Walton Arena; Fayetteville, AR
SEC tournament
March 10–14, 2027		vs.						Bridgestone Arena; Nashville, TN
*Non-conference game. ^{#}Rankings from AP Poll. (#) Tournament seedings in parentheses. All times are in Central Time.

== Rankings ==
Ranking movements Legend: ██ Increase in ranking ██ Decrease in ranking
	Week																				
Poll	Pre	1	2	3	4	5	6	7	8	9	10	11	12	13	14	15	16	17	18	19	Final
AP	12	19	20																		
Coaches	13	20	23																		
