= 2026–27 Texas A&M Aggies men's basketball team =

American college basketball season

2026–27 Texas A&M Aggies men's basketball
- Conference: Southeastern Conference
- Record: 4–0 (0–0 SEC)
- Head coach: Bucky McMillan (2nd season)
- Associate head coach: Mitch Cole (2nd season)
- Assistant coaches: Kyle Keller; Frank Haith; TJ Cleveland; Dave Good
- Home arena: Reed Arena

2026–27 Southeastern Conference men's basketball standings
	Conf.				Overall
Team	W		L	PCT	W		L	PCT
No. 18 Alabama	0	–	0	–	4	–	0	1.000
No. 1 Florida	0	–	0	–	4	–	0	1.000
Georgia	0	–	0	–	4	–	0	1.000
Texas A&M	0	–	0	–	4	–	0	1.000
No. 22 Vanderbilt	0	–	0	–	4	–	0	1.000
LSU	0	–	0	–	3	–	0	1.000
Ole Miss	0	–	0	–	3	–	0	1.000
South Carolina	0	–	0	–	3	–	0	1.000
No. 11 Tennessee	0	–	0	–	3	–	0	1.000
No. 7 Texas	0	–	0	–	3	–	0	1.000
No. 19 Arkansas	0	–	0	–	3	–	1	.750
Mississippi State	0	–	0	–	3	–	1	.750
Oklahoma	0	–	0	–	3	–	1	.750
Auburn	0	–	0	–	2	–	1	.667
No. 24 Kentucky	0	–	0	–	2	–	1	.667
Missouri	0	–	0	–	2	–	1	.667
† 2027 SEC tournament winner As of November 15, 2026; Rankings from AP poll

The 2026–27 Texas A&M Aggies men's basketball team represents Texas A&M University during the 2026–27 NCAA Division I men's basketball season. The Aggies, led by second-year head coach Bucky McMillan, play their home games at Reed Arena in College Station, Texas, as a member of the Southeastern Conference.

== Previous season ==
The Aggies finished the 2025–26 season 22–12, 11–7 in SEC play. As the No. 6 seed in the SEC tournament, they lost to No. 11 seed Oklahoma 83–63 in the second round. They received an at-large bid to the NCAA tournament as the No. 10 seed in the South Region. There they beat No. 7 seed Saint Mary's 63–50 in the first round, McMillan becoming the second coach in program history to win an NCAA tournament game in his first season. They then lost to No. 2 seed Houston 88–57 in the second round.

== Offseason ==
=== Roster turnover ===
Seven players from the 2025–26 roster returned, and McMillan's full coaching staff stayed in place. Rashaun Agee, who led the Aggies with 14.6 points and 8.7 rebounds per game, used up his eligibility. Four players transferred to other Division I programs, among them Pop Isaacs to Oklahoma and Rubén Domínguez to Xavier.

The Aggies' first transfer addition was PJ Haggerty, who was announced on April 16. Haggerty had averaged 23.4 points per game at Kansas State, fourth in Division I, after being named the AAC Player of the Year and a second-team All-American at Memphis in 2024–25. Radford guard Lukas Walls and Tennessee forward Cade Phillips followed the same week. Texas A&M then added guard Jalen Reece from LSU, forward Jalen Shelley, an All-WCC honorable mention at LMU, and guard Tyshawn Archie, a first-team All-Southland selection at McNeese.

=== Eligibility cases ===
On April 23, the Aggies announced the addition of former five-star recruit Bryson Warren, who had spent three seasons in the NBA G League after playing in Overtime Elite. The NCAA denied his eligibility waiver in August. A Brazos County judge then granted him a temporary restraining order, and he entered the transfer portal on August 27 to keep his options open. He is not on the 2026–27 roster.

Two other guards returned to college through court rulings that followed the NCAA's new age-based eligibility model. On August 17, Texas guard Jordan Pope, who had used four seasons at Oregon State and Texas, committed to the Aggies. On August 27, Rylan Griffen, who had finished his fourth season with the Aggies, was granted a temporary restraining order against the NCAA and the SEC that let him return to Texas A&M for a fifth season.

=== Departures ===
Texas A&M departures
Name	Number	Pos.	Height	Weight	Year	Hometown	Reason for Departure
Marcus Hill	0	G	6'3"	192	Graduate Student	Rockford, Illinois	Graduated
Josh Holloway	1	G	6'1"	178	Junior	Memphis, Tennessee	Transferred to Memphis
Pop Isaacs	2	G	6'2"	182	Junior	Las Vegas, Nevada	Transferred to Oklahoma
Jacari Lane	5	G	6'0"	178	Senior	Huntsville, Alabama	Graduated
Ali Dibba	6	G	6'5"	210	Graduate Student	Stockholm, Sweden	Graduated
Noah Shelby	8	G	6'3"	190	Junior	McKinney, Texas	Transferred to UT Arlington
Rubén Domínguez	9	G	6'6"	213	Sophomore	Puerto Real, Spain	Transferred to Xavier
Rashaun Agee	12	F	6'8"	231	Graduate Student	Chicago, Illinois	Out of eligibility
Eemil Martinez	19	G	5'10"	160	Freshman	Helsinki, Finland	Left the program
Federiko Federiko	33	F	6'11"	226	Graduate Student	Helsinki, Finland	Graduated

=== Incoming transfers ===
Texas A&M incoming transfers
Name	Number	Pos.	Height	Weight	Year	Hometown	Previous School
Jordan Pope	0	G	6'1"	180	Graduate Student	Oakley, California	Texas
Jalen Shelley	1	F	6'9"	215	Junior	Little Elm, Texas	LMU
Jalen Reece	2	G	6'0"	185	Sophomore	Orlando, Florida	LSU
PJ Haggerty	4	G	6'4"	195	Graduate Student	Baytown, Texas	Kansas State
Preston Clark	6	F	6'6"	216	Graduate Student	Austin, Texas	Maryville
Tyshawn Archie	8	G	6'1"	175	Senior	Houston, Texas	McNeese
Cade Phillips	12	F	6'9"	225	Senior	Gadsden, Alabama	Tennessee
Lukas Walls	24	G	6'5"	208	Senior	Knoxville, Tennessee	Radford

=== 2026 recruiting class ===
Texas A&M 2026 recruiting class
Name	Number	Pos.	Height	Weight	Hometown	High school
Neiko Mundey	3	G	6'1"	190	Washington, D.C.	Prince George's Christian Academy
Josh Irving	23	F	6'11"	220	Pasadena, California	Pasadena HS

== Preseason ==
On October 12, 2026, the SEC released its preseason media poll. Texas A&M was picked to finish ninth in the conference, and Haggerty was named to the media's preseason All-SEC third team. The league's coaches also put him on their preseason third team, and he was named to the preseason watch list for the Jerry West Award. In their only exhibition, the Aggies lost 94–88 at SMU on October 25 despite 28 points from Haggerty.

=== Preseason rankings ===
SEC Preseason Media Poll
Place	Team
1	Florida
2	Texas
3	Arkansas
4	Tennessee
5	Alabama
6	Vanderbilt
7	Kentucky
8	Missouri
9	Texas A&M
10	Auburn
11	Georgia
12	Oklahoma
13	Ole Miss
14	LSU
15	Mississippi State
16	South Carolina

== Roster ==
2026–27 Texas A&M Aggies men's basketball team
Players
Coaches

Pos.	#	Name	Height	Weight	Year	Previous school	Hometown
G	0	Jordan Pope	6 ft 1 in (1.85 m)	180 lb (82 kg)		Texas	Oakley, CA
F	1	Jalen Shelley	6 ft 9 in (2.06 m)	215 lb (98 kg)	Jr	LMU	Little Elm, TX
G	2	Jalen Reece	6 ft 0 in (1.83 m)	185 lb (84 kg)	So	Oak Ridge HS; LSU	Orlando, FL
G	3	Neiko Mundey	6 ft 1 in (1.85 m)	190 lb (86 kg)	Fr	Prince George's Christian Academy	Washington, D.C.
G	4	PJ Haggerty	6 ft 4 in (1.93 m)	195 lb (88 kg)		Kansas State	Baytown, TX
G	5	Rylan Griffen	6 ft 5 in (1.96 m)	181 lb (82 kg)		Kansas	Dallas, TX
F	6	Preston Clark	6 ft 6 in (1.98 m)	216 lb (98 kg)		Maryville	Austin, TX
F	7	Zach Clemence	6 ft 11 in (2.11 m)	230 lb (104 kg)		Kansas	San Antonio, TX
G	8	Tyshawn Archie	6 ft 1 in (1.85 m)	175 lb (79 kg)	Sr	McNeese	Houston, TX
F	9	Jamie Vinson	6 ft 11 in (2.11 m)	250 lb (113 kg)	Jr	Texas	Austin, TX
G	10	Jeremiah Green	6 ft 3 in (1.91 m)	189 lb (86 kg)	So	Compass Prep (AZ)	Denton, TX
F	12	Cade Phillips	6 ft 9 in (2.06 m)	225 lb (102 kg)	Sr	Tennessee	Gadsden, AL
F	14	Chris McDermott	6 ft 7 in (2.01 m)	228 lb (103 kg)	Jr	Booker T. Washington	Houston, TX
G	15	Kyle Moran	6 ft 3 in (1.91 m)	187 lb (85 kg)		Lake Highlands HS	Lake Highlands, TX
F	21	Mackenzie Mgbako	6 ft 9 in (2.06 m)	225 lb (102 kg)	Sr	Indiana	Franklin, NJ
F	23	Josh Irving	6 ft 11 in (2.11 m)	220 lb (100 kg)	Fr	Pasadena HS	Pasadena, CA
G	24	Lukas Walls	6 ft 5 in (1.96 m)	208 lb (94 kg)	Sr	Radford	Knoxville, TN

Head coach

- Bucky McMillan (Birmingham–Southern)

Assistant coach(es)

- Mitch Cole (Montana State Billings)
- Kyle Keller (Oklahoma State)
- Frank Haith (Elon)
- TJ Cleveland (Arkansas)
- Dave Good (Central Michigan)

Legend

- (C) Team captain
- (S) Suspended
- (I) Ineligible
- (W) Walk-on
- Injured
- Current redshirt

Roster
Last update: November 13, 2026

== Schedule and results ==
Date time, TV	Rank^{#}	Opponent^{#}	Result	Record	High points	High rebounds	High assists	Site (attendance) city, state
Exhibition
October 25, 2026*; 1:00 p.m.		at SMU	L 88–94	–	28 – Haggerty	8 – Mgbako	4 – Haggerty	Moody Coliseum; Dallas, TX
Non-conference regular season
November 3, 2026*; 7:00 p.m., SECN+		Alabama State	W 97–66	1–0	22 – Haggerty	12 – Shelley	3 – Tied	Reed Arena (6,740); College Station, TX
November 6, 2026*; 7:00 p.m., SECN+		Northern Kentucky	W 104–67	2–0	18 – Pope	7 – Mgbako	4 – Mgbako	Reed Arena (6,453); College Station, TX
November 9, 2026*; 7:00 p.m., SECN+		Louisiana–Monroe	W 108–67	3–0	22 – Haggerty	9 – Shelley	4 – Tied	Reed Arena (6,283); College Station, TX
November 12, 2026*; 7:00 p.m., SECN+		Oklahoma State	W 88–69	4–0	22 – Haggerty	10 – Irving	6 – Pope	Reed Arena (8,606); College Station, TX
November 16, 2026*; 7:30 p.m., SECN+		Southeastern Louisiana						Reed Arena; College Station, TX
November 19, 2026*; 7:00 p.m., Peacock		at TCU						Schollmaier Arena; Fort Worth, TX
November 25, 2026*; 1:30 p.m., ESPN2		vs. Xavier; Battle 4 Atlantis						Imperial Arena; Paradise Island, Bahamas
November 27, 2026*; 4:00 p.m., SECN		vs. Marquette; Battle 4 Atlantis						Imperial Arena; Paradise Island, Bahamas
December 2, 2026*; 8:15 p.m., ESPNU		Stanford; SEC/ACC Challenge						Reed Arena; College Station, TX
December 6, 2026*; 3:00 p.m., SECN		Arkansas–Pine Bluff						Reed Arena; College Station, TX
December 12, 2026*; 2:00 p.m., ESPNU		vs. Florida State; Houston Hoopfest						Toyota Center; Houston, TX
December 17, 2026*; 6:00 p.m., SECN		Holy Cross						Reed Arena; College Station, TX
December 21, 2026*; 1:00 p.m., SECN+		North Florida						Reed Arena; College Station, TX
December 29, 2026*; 7:00 p.m., SECN+		Prairie View A&M						Reed Arena; College Station, TX
SEC regular season
January 2, 2027; 7:30 p.m., SECN		Auburn						Reed Arena; College Station, TX
January 5, 2027; 8:00 p.m., SECN		at Missouri						Mizzou Arena; Columbia, MO
January 9, 2027; 2:30 p.m., SECN		at South Carolina						Colonial Life Arena; Columbia, SC
January 12, 2027; 6:00 p.m., ESPN2 or ESPNU		Arkansas						Reed Arena; College Station, TX
January 16, 2027; 5:00 p.m., SECN		LSU						Reed Arena; College Station, TX
January 20, 2027; 6:00 p.m., ESPN2 or ESPNU		at Florida						Exactech Arena; Gainesville, FL
January 23, 2027; 5:00 p.m., SECN		at Ole Miss						SJB Pavilion; Oxford, MS
January 26, 2027; 6:00 p.m., ESPN or ESPN2		Tennessee						Reed Arena; College Station, TX
January 30, 2027; 1:00 p.m., ESPN or ESPN2		at Vanderbilt						Memorial Gymnasium; Nashville, TN
February 2, 2027; 8:00 p.m., SECN		Oklahoma						Reed Arena; College Station, TX
February 6, 2027; 5:00 p.m., SECN		at Mississippi State						Humphrey Coliseum; Starkville, MS
February 13, 2027; 2:30 p.m., SECN		Georgia						Reed Arena; College Station, TX
February 17, 2027; 8:00 p.m., ESPN2 or ESPNU		at Texas						Moody Center; Austin, TX
February 20, 2027; 3:00 or 3:30 p.m., ESPN2		Vanderbilt						Reed Arena; College Station, TX
February 23, 2027; 8:00 p.m., SECN		Alabama						Reed Arena; College Station, TX
February 27, 2027; 7:30 p.m., SECN		at LSU						Pete Maravich Assembly Center; Baton Rouge, LA
March 3, 2027; 6:00 p.m., ESPN2 or ESPNU		at Kentucky						Rupp Arena; Lexington, KY
March 6, 2027; 7:00 p.m., SECN		Texas						Reed Arena; College Station, TX
SEC tournament
March 10–14, 2027; TBA		vs. TBD						Bridgestone Arena; Nashville, TN
*Non-conference game. ^{#}Rankings from AP poll. (#) Tournament seedings in parentheses. All times are in Central Time.
