= 2026–27 Oklahoma Sooners men's basketball team =

College basketball season

2026–27 Oklahoma Sooners men's basketball
- Conference: Southeastern Conference
- Record: 3–1 (0–0 SEC)
- Head coach: Porter Moser (6th season)
- Assistant coaches: Justin Scott (2nd season); Ryan Humphrey (5th season); Brock Morris (4th season); Clayton Custer (4th season)
- Home arena: Lloyd Noble Center

2026–27 Southeastern Conference men's basketball standings
	Conf.				Overall
Team	W		L	PCT	W		L	PCT
Georgia	0	–	0	–	6	–	0	1.000
No. 25 LSU	0	–	0	–	6	–	0	1.000
Texas A&M	0	–	0	–	6	–	0	1.000
No. 15 Vanderbilt	0	–	0	–	6	–	0	1.000
No. 16 Alabama	0	–	0	–	5	–	0	1.000
South Carolina	0	–	0	–	5	–	0	1.000
No. 14 Tennessee	0	–	0	–	5	–	0	1.000
No. 6 Texas	0	–	0	–	5	–	0	1.000
Ole Miss	0	–	0	–	4	–	0	1.000
No. 1 Florida	0	–	0	–	6	–	1	.857
Mississippi State	0	–	0	–	5	–	1	.833
Missouri	0	–	0	–	5	–	1	.833
Oklahoma	0	–	0	–	4	–	1	.800
No. 20 Arkansas	0	–	0	–	4	–	2	.667
Kentucky	0	–	0	–	4	–	2	.667
Auburn	0	–	0	–	3	–	3	.500
† 2027 SEC tournament winner As of November 22, 2026; Rankings from AP poll

The 2026–27 Oklahoma Sooners men's basketball team will represent the University of Oklahoma during the 2026–27 NCAA Division I men's basketball season. The Sooners will be led by head coach Porter Moser in his sixth year, and will play their home games at Lloyd Noble Center in Norman, Oklahoma, as members of the Southeastern Conference (SEC).

== Previous season ==
The Sooners finished the 2025–26 season with a 21–16 record, 7–11 in conference play to finish the regular season at eleventh. As the No. 11 seed in the SEC tournament, the Sooners defeated South Carolina in the first round and Texas A&M in the second round before falling to the eventual champions Arkansas in the quarterfinals. The Sooners failed to qualify for the NCAA tournament being the first four out after qualifying last season. The Sooners accepted a bid to the College Basketball Crown and defeated Colorado in overtime, Baylor in the semifinals before losing in overtime to West Virginia.

== Offseason ==
=== Departures ===
Player	Position	Height	Weight	Year	Departure
Nijel Pack	G	5'10	188	Redshirt senior	Graduated
Mohamed Wague	F-C	6'10	225	Graduate student	Graduated
Tae Davis	F	6'9	215	Senior	Graduated
Jadon Jones	G	6'5	190	Graduate student	Graduated
Kirill Elatontsev	C	6'11	240	Senior	Graduated
Reid Lovelace	G	5'10	140	Senior	Graduated
Kuol Atak	F	6'9	192	Redshirt freshman	Transferred to Virginia Tech
Andreas Holst	F	7'0	200	Freshman	Transferred to Florida International (FIU)
Jeff Nwankwo	G	6'6	210	Redshirt senior	Transferred to Youngstown State
Jake Hansen	G	6'0	170	Freshman	Transferred to Milwaukee

=== Additions ===
Player	Position	Height	Weight	Year	Previous Team
Khani Rooths	F	6'10	215	Sophomore	Louisville
Tyler Hendricks	G-F	6'6	185	Redshirt junior	Utah Valley
Pop Isaacs	G	6'2	182	Junior	Texas A&M
Yaak Yaak	C	6'11	230	Junior	Oregon State
B.J. Edwards	G	6'3	200	Senior	SMU
Duke Brennan	F	6'10	250	Senior	Villanova
Tae Davis	F	6'9	215	Senior	Oklahoma

=== Recruiting classes ===
On May 12, 2026, Oklahoma landed consensus top-65 player Quincy Wadley of AZ Compass Prep in Chandler, Arizona. At the time of his signing, Wadley was ranked No. 52 in the 2025 national class by 247Sports, becoming Oklahoma's second-highest-rated signee since Trae Young and Jeremiah Fears.

College recruiting
Name	Hometown	School	Height	Weight	Commit date
Quincy Wadley; G	Chandler, Arizona	Arizona Compass Prep (AZ)	6 ft 4 in (1.93 m)	185 lb (84 kg)	May 14, 2026
Quincy Wadley; G	Recruit ratings: Rivals: 247Sports: ESPN: (87)				
Gage Mayfield; F	Moundville, Alabama	Hale County High School	6 ft 7 in (2.01 m)	200 lb (91 kg)	Nov 12, 2025
Gage Mayfield; F	Recruit ratings: Rivals: 247Sports: ESPN: (83)				

== Roster ==
2026–27 Oklahoma Sooners men's basketball team
Players
Coaches

Pos.	#	Name	Height	Weight	Year	Previous school	Hometown
G	0	Ben Moser (W)	6 ft 3 in (1.91 m)	185 lb (84 kg)	Sr	Norman North HS	Norman, OK
G	1	Xzayvier Brown	6 ft 3 in (1.91 m)	185 lb (84 kg)	Sr	Saint Joseph's	Philadelphia, PA
G	2	Pop Isaacs	6 ft 2 in (1.88 m)	185 lb (84 kg)	GS	Texas A&M	Las Vegas, NV
G	3	Quincy Wadley	6 ft 5 in (1.96 m)	175 lb (79 kg)	Fr	Compass Prep	Washington, D.C.
F	4	Gage Mayfield	6 ft 7 in (2.01 m)	220 lb (100 kg)	Fr	Hale County HS	Moundville, AL
G	5	B.J. Edwards	6 ft 3 in (1.91 m)	200 lb (91 kg)	GS	SMU	Knoxville, TN
F	6	Finley Keeffe	6 ft 7 in (2.01 m)	215 lb (98 kg)	So	The Skill Factory Prep	Novato, CA
G	7	Dayton Forsythe	6 ft 2 in (1.88 m)	190 lb (86 kg)	Jr	Dale HS	Dale, OK
F/C	8	Kai Rogers	6 ft 10 in (2.08 m)	250 lb (113 kg)	So	Overtime Elite	Wauwatosa, WI
C	9	Yaak Yaak	7 ft 0 in (2.13 m)	230 lb (104 kg)	Sr	Oregon State	Adelaide, Australia
F	11	Khani Rooths	6 ft 9 in (2.06 m)	215 lb (98 kg)	Jr	Louisville	Washington, D.C.
F	13	Tae Davis (I)	6 ft 9 in (2.06 m)	215 lb (98 kg)	GS	Notre Dame	Indianapolis, IN
G	15	Tyler Hendricks	6 ft 6 in (1.98 m)	185 lb (84 kg)	GS	Utah Valley	Fort Lauderdale, FL
F	32	Duke Brennan	6 ft 10 in (2.08 m)	260 lb (118 kg)	GS	Villanova	Chandler, AZ
F	35	Derrion Reid	6 ft 8 in (2.03 m)	225 lb (102 kg)	Jr	Alabama	Augusta, GA

Head coach

- Porter Moser (Creighton)

Assistant coach(es)

- Clayton Custer (Loyola Chicago)
- Ryan Humphrey (Notre Dame)
- Brock Morris (Snead State)
- Justin Scott (East Stroudsburg)
- Mike Greenman (Williams)

Legend

- (C) Team captain
- (S) Suspended
- (I) Ineligible
- (W) Walk-on
- (5th) Fifth-year senior
- Injured
- Current redshirt

Roster
Last update: October 15, 2026

== Schedule and results ==
Date time, TV	Rank^{#}	Opponent^{#}	Result	Record	High points	High rebounds	High assists	Site (attendance) city, state
Non-conference regular season
November 2, 2026*; 7:00 p.m., SECN+		East Texas A&M	L 64–68	0–1	15 – Isaacs	10 – Reid	3 – Tied	Lloyd Noble Center (4,647); Norman, OK
November 6, 2026*; 7:00 p.m., SECN+		Mississippi Valley State; McCasland Student Game	W 84–57	1–1	18 – Edwards	7 – Wadley	7 – Brown	McCasland Field House (2,086); Norman, OK
November 9, 2026*; 7:00 p.m., SECN+		North Alabama	W 81–72	2–1	19 – Brown	6 – Tied	4 – Isaacs	Lloyd Noble Center (4,390); Norman, OK
November 13, 2026*; 7:00 p.m., SECN+		Fairleigh Dickinson	W 74–58	3–1	16 – Edwards	8 – Tied	7 – Brown	Lloyd Noble Center (4,765); Norman, OK
November 18, 2026*; 7:00 p.m., SECN+		Campbell	W 87—78	4—1	27 – Brown	6 – Reid	8 – Brown	Lloyd Noble Center (4,431); Norman, OK
November 24, 2026*; 12:30 p.m., FS2		vs. Pittsburgh; Fort Myers Tip-Off – Beach Division						Suncoast Credit Union Arena; Fort Myers, FL
November 26, 2026*; 11:00 a.m., FOX		vs. Purdue; Fort Myers Tip-Off – Beach Division						Suncoast Credit Union Arena; Fort Myers, FL
December 1, 2026*; 8:00 p.m., ESPNU		Syracuse; ACC–SEC Challenge						Lloyd Noble Center; Norman, OK
December 5, 2026*; 11:00 a.m., ESPNU		vs. Arizona State						BOK Center; Tulsa, OK
December 7, 2026*; 8:00 p.m., SECN		Alabama State						Lloyd Noble Center; Norman, OK
December 12, 2026*; 1:30 p.m., ESPN2		vs. Oklahoma State; Bedlam Series						Paycom Center; Oklahoma City, OK
December 17, 2026*; 8:00 p.m., SECN		Jackson State						Lloyd Noble Center; Norman, OK
December 22, 2026*; 7:30 p.m., ESPNU		at SMU						Moody Coliseum; Dallas, TX
December 28, 2026*; 7:00 p.m., SECN+		Louisiana–Monroe						Lloyd Noble Center; Norman, OK
SEC regular season
January 2, 2027; 11:00 a.m., ESPN/ESPN2		Kentucky						Lloyd Noble Center; Norman, OK
January 6, 2027; 8:00 p.m., ESPN2		at Florida						O'Connell Center; Gainesville, FL
January 9, 2027; 5:00 p.m., SECN		Mississippi State						Lloyd Noble Center; Norman, OK
January 12, 2027; 6:00 p.m., SECN		at Georgia						Stegeman Coliseum; Athens, GA
January 16, 2027; 11:00 a.m., ESPN/ESPN2		at Texas						Moody Center; Austin, TX
January 19, 2027; 6:00 p.m., ESPN/ESPN2/ESPNU		Missouri						Lloyd Noble Center; Norman, OK
January 23, 2027; 7:30 p.m., SECN		at Alabama						Coleman Coliseum; Tuscaloosa, AL
January 30, 2027; 12:00 p.m., SECN		South Carolina						Lloyd Noble Center; Norman, OK
February 2, 2027; 8:00 p.m., SECN		at Texas A&M						Reed Arena; College Station, TX
February 6, 2027; 2:30 p.m., SECN		at Auburn						Neville Arena; Auburn, AL
February 10, 2027; 6:00 p.m., ESPNU/ESPN2		Tennessee						Lloyd Noble Center; Norman, OK
February 13, 2027; 12:00 p.m., SECN		LSU						Lloyd Noble Center; Norman, OK
February 16, 2027; 6:00 p.m., SECN		at Missouri						Mizzou Arena; Columbia, MO
February 20, 2027; 7:30 p.m., ESPN		Texas						Lloyd Noble Center; Norman, OK
February 24, 2027; 8:00 p.m., SECN		Georgia						Lloyd Noble Center; Norman, OK
February 27, 2027; 2:30 p.m., SECN		at Ole Miss						SJB Pavillion; Oxford, MS
March 3, 2027; 8:00 p.m., ESPNU/ESPN2		Vanderbilt						Lloyd Noble Center; Norman, OK
March 6, 2027; 11:00 a.m., ESPN/ESPNU		at Arkansas						Bud Walton Arena; Fayetteville, AR
SEC tournament
March 10–14, 2027		vs.						Bridgestone Arena; Nashville, TN
*Non-conference game. ^{#}Rankings from AP poll. (#) Tournament seedings in parentheses. All times are in Central Time.
