= 2026–27 Missouri Tigers men's basketball team =

US college team

2026–27 Missouri Tigers men's basketball
- Conference: Southeastern Conference
- Record: 5–1 (0–0 SEC)
- Head coach: Dennis Gates (5th season)
- Associate head coach: Kyle Smithpeters (5th season)
- Assistant coaches: Ryan Sharbaugh (4th season); Tavaras Hardy (1st season); Matt Cline (4th season); Jimmie Foster (1st season)
- Home arena: Mizzou Arena

2026–27 Southeastern Conference men's basketball standings
| | Conf. | | | | Overall |
| Team | W | | L | PCT | W | | L | PCT |
|---|---|---|---|---|---|---|---|---|
| Texas A&M | 0 | – | 0 | – | 6 | – | 0 | 1.000 |
| No. 16 Alabama | 0 | – | 0 | – | 5 | – | 0 | 1.000 |
| Georgia | 0 | – | 0 | – | 5 | – | 0 | 1.000 |
| No. 25 LSU | 0 | – | 0 | – | 5 | – | 0 | 1.000 |
| South Carolina | 0 | – | 0 | – | 5 | – | 0 | 1.000 |
| No. 6 Texas | 0 | – | 0 | – | 5 | – | 0 | 1.000 |
| No. 15 Vanderbilt | 0 | – | 0 | – | 5 | – | 0 | 1.000 |
| Ole Miss | 0 | – | 0 | – | 4 | – | 0 | 1.000 |
| No. 14 Tennessee | 0 | – | 0 | – | 4 | – | 0 | 1.000 |
| No. 1 Florida | 0 | – | 0 | – | 6 | – | 1 | .857 |
| Kentucky | 0 | – | 0 | – | 4 | – | 1 | .800 |
| Mississippi State | 0 | – | 0 | – | 4 | – | 1 | .800 |
| Missouri | 0 | – | 0 | – | 4 | – | 1 | .800 |
| Oklahoma | 0 | – | 0 | – | 4 | – | 1 | .800 |
| No. 20 Arkansas | 0 | – | 0 | – | 3 | – | 2 | .600 |
| Auburn | 0 | – | 0 | – | 3 | – | 3 | .500 |
† 2027 SEC tournament winner As of November 21, 2026; Rankings from AP poll

The 2026–27 Missouri Tigers men's basketball team represents the University of Missouri in the 2026–27 NCAA Division I men's basketball season and are led by fifth-year head coach Dennis Gates. The team plays its home games at Mizzou Arena in Columbia, Missouri, as a fifteenth-year member of the Southeastern Conference.

== Previous season ==
The Tigers finished the season 20–13, 10–8 in SEC play. They finished in a three-way tie for 7th place. As the 8th seed for the SEC tournament, they had a first round bye and played the 9th seed Kentucky. They lost to Kentucky 72–78. The Tigers made it to the NCAA tournament as a 10th seed against 7th seed Miami (FL). Missouri lost 66–80, ending their season.

=== Departures ===
Missouri departures
| Name | Number | Pos. | Height | Weight | Year | Hometown | Reason for departure |
|---|---|---|---|---|---|---|---|
| Anthony Robinson | 0 | G | 6'3" | 180 | Junior | Tallahassee, FL | Transferred to Florida State |
| T.O. Barrett | 5 | G | 6'4" | 200 | Sophomore | Edmond, OK | Transferred to Vanderbilt |
| Sebastian Mack | 12 | G | 6'3" | 195 | Junior | Chicago, IL | Transferred to UNLV |
| Jevon Porter | 14 | F | 6'11" | 230 | Senior | Columbia, MO | Entered the transfer portal |
| Shawn Phillips | 15 | C | 7'0" | 245 | Senior | Dayton, OH | Graduated |
| Jayden Stone | 17 | G | 6'4" | 185 | Graduate student | Perth, Australia | Graduated |
| Jacob Crews | 35 | G/F | 6'8" | 210 | Graduate student | Hilliard, FL | Graduated |

=== Incoming transfers ===
Missouri Incoming transfers
| Name | Number | Pos. | Height | Weight | Year | Hometown | Previous school |
|---|---|---|---|---|---|---|---|
| Cord Stansberry | 0 | G | 6'3" | 195 | Graduate Student | Bermuda Dunes, CA | Western Carolina |
| Jamier Jones | 1 | F | 6'6" | 220 | Sophomore | Sarasota, FL | Providence |
| Kennard Davis Jr. | 4 | G | 6'4" | 185 | Senior | Saint Louis, MO | BYU |
| Jordan Crawford | 8 | G | 6'3" | 178 | Graduate Student | Charlotte, NC | South Dakota |
| Bryson Tiller | 15 | F | 6'11" | 240 | Sophomore | Atlanta, GA | Kansas |
| Jaylen Carey | 23 | F | 6'8" | 267 | Senior | Southwest Ranches, FL | Tennessee |
| CJ Gunn | 9 | G | 6'7" | 200 | Graduate Student | Indianapolis, IN | DePaul |

==== 2026 recruiting class ====
College recruiting
| Name | Hometown | School | Height | Weight | Commit date |
|---|---|---|---|---|---|
| Jason Crowe Jr. G | | Inglewood High School | 6 ft 3 in (1.91 m) | 170 lb (77 kg) | Jul 18, 2025 |
| Jason Crowe Jr. G | Recruit ratings: Rivals: 247Sports: On3: ESPN: (94) | | | | |
| Toni Bryant; F | | Zephyrhills Christian Academy | 6 ft 9 in (2.06 m) | 215 lb (98 kg) | Sep 8, 2025 |
| Toni Bryant; F | Recruit ratings: Rivals: 247Sports: On3: ESPN: (92) | | | | |
| Aidan Chronister; F | | The New School | 6 ft 7 in (2.01 m) | 170 lb (77 kg) | Sep 21, 2025 |
| Aidan Chronister; F | Recruit ratings: On3: | | | | |
Overall recruit ranking:
Note: In many cases, Scout, Rivals, 247Sports, On3, and ESPN may conflict in their listings of height and weight.; In these cases, the average was taken. ESPN grades are on a 100-point scale.; Sources:

== Roster ==
2026–27 Missouri Tigers men's basketball team
Players
Coaches

| Pos. | # | Name | Height | Weight | Year | Previous school | Hometown |
|---|---|---|---|---|---|---|---|
| G | 0 | Cord Stansberry | 6 ft 3 in (1.91 m) | 195 lb (88 kg) | GS | Western Carolina | Bermuda Dunes, CA |
| F | 1 | Jamier Jones | 6 ft 6 in (1.98 m) | 220 lb (100 kg) | So | Providence | Sarasota, FL |
| G | 2 | Aaron Rowe | 6 ft 2 in (1.88 m) | 155 lb (70 kg) | So | Tolton Catholic HS | Columbia, MO |
| G | 4 | Kennard Davis Jr. | 6 ft 4 in (1.93 m) | 185 lb (84 kg) | Sr | BYU | Saint Louis, MO |
| G | 5 | Jason Crowe Jr. | 6 ft 3 in (1.91 m) | 170 lb (77 kg) | Fr | Inglewood HS | Inglewood, CA |
| G | 6 | Annor Boateng | 6 ft 6 in (1.98 m) | 215 lb (98 kg) | Jr | Little Rock HS | Little Rock, AR |
| C | 7 | Trent Burns | 7 ft 5 in (2.26 m) | 235 lb (107 kg) | Jr | Pro-Vision Academy | Houston, TX |
| G | 8 | Jordan Crawford | 6 ft 3 in (1.91 m) | 178 lb (81 kg) | GS | South Dakota | Charlotte, NC |
| G | 9 | CJ Gunn (I) | 6 ft 7 in (2.01 m) | 200 lb (91 kg) | GS | DePaul | Indianapolis, IN |
| F | 10 | Aidan Chronister | 6 ft 7 in (2.01 m) | 170 lb (77 kg) | Fr | The New School | Rogers, AR |
| G/F | 11 | Trent Pierce | 6 ft 10 in (2.08 m) | 220 lb (100 kg) | Sr | Compass Prep | Tulsa, OK |
| F | 14 | Toni Bryant | 6 ft 9 in (2.06 m) | 215 lb (98 kg) | Fr | Zephyrhills Christian Academy | Tampa, FL |
| F | 15 | Bryson Tiller | 6 ft 11 in (2.11 m) | 240 lb (109 kg) | So | Kansas | Atlanta, GA |
| F | 23 | Jaylen Carey (S) | 6 ft 8 in (2.03 m) | 267 lb (121 kg) | Sr | Tennessee | Southwest Ranches, FL |
| G/F | 24 | Nicholas Randall | 6 ft 9 in (2.06 m) | 240 lb (109 kg) | So | Compass Prep | St. Louis, MO |
| G/F | 25 | Mark Mitchell | 6 ft 9 in (2.06 m) | 230 lb (104 kg) | GS | Duke | Kansas City, KS |
| F | 45 | Luke Northweather | 6 ft 11 in (2.11 m) | 235 lb (107 kg) | GS | Oklahoma | Jefferson City, MO |

Head coach

- Dennis Gates (California)

Assistant coach(es)

- Kyle Smithpeters (Southern Illinois)
- Ryan Sharbaugh (Westminster)
- Matt Cline (South Alabama)
- Tavaras Hardy (Northwestern)
- Jimmie Foster (South Dakota)

Legend

- (C) Team captain
- (S) Suspended
- (I) Ineligible
- (W) Walk-on
- Injured
- Current redshirt

Roster

== Schedule and results ==
| Date time, TV | Rank^{#} | Opponent^{#} | Result | Record | High points | High rebounds | High assists | Site (attendance) city, state |
Exhibition
| October 23, 2026*; ESPN+ | | at Kansas State | W 71-67 | | 21 – Crowe Jr. | 9 – Tiller | 5 – Crowe Jr. | Bramlage Coliseum (6,800); Manhattan, KS |
| October 29, 2026*; 9:00 p.m., MW+ | | at UNLV | L 81-90 | | 25 – Crowe Jr. | 8 – Tiller | 6 – Crowe Jr. | Thomas & Mack Center (4,505); Las Vegas, NV |
Non-conference regular season
| November 3, 2026*; 7:00 p.m., SECN+ | | Cleveland State | W 111–50 | 1–0 | 23 – Crowe Jr. | 9 – Tiller | 10 – Mitchell | Mizzou Arena (10,089); Columbia, MO |
| November 6, 2026*; 6:00 p.m., ESPNU | | vs. Saint Louis | L 84–90 | 1–1 | 35 – Tiller | 10 – Jones | 7 – Crowe Jr. | Enterprise Center (18,111); St. Louis, MO |
| November 9, 2026*; 7:00 p.m., SECN+ | | SIU Edwardsville | W 96–58 | 2–1 | 34 – Crowe Jr. | 7 – Tiller, Bryant | 5 – Pierce | Mizzou Arena (8,314); Columbia, MO |
| November 15, 2026*; 1:30 p.m., NBCSN/Peacock | | vs. Marquette | W 69–64 | 3–1 | 17 – Crowe Jr. | 8 – Pierce | 6 – Crowe Jr. | United Center (6,191); Chicago, IL |
| November 18, 2026*; 8:00 p.m., SECN | | Alcorn State | W 102–41 | 4–1 | 23 – Tiller | 10 – Tiller | 3 – Tied | Mizzou Arena (8,041); Columbia, MO |
| November 20, 2026*; 7:00 p.m., SECN+ | | Le Moyne | W 91–64 | 5–1 | 18 – Tiller | 9 – Mitchell Jr. | 6 – Mitchell Jr. | Mizzou Arena (8,179); Columbia, MO |
| November 24, 2026*; 8:00 p.m., SECN+ | | Evansville | | | | | | Mizzou Arena; Columbia, MO |
| November 27, 2026*; 3:00 p.m., SECN+ | | Arkansas–Pine Bluff | | | | | | Mizzou Arena; Columbia, MO |
| December 1, 2026*; 6:00 p.m., SECN | | Pittsburgh; ACC–SEC Challenge | | | | | | Mizzou Arena; Columbia, MO |
| December 6, 2026*; 4:00 p.m., ESPN | | vs. Kansas; Border War | | | | | | T-Mobile Center; Kansas City, MO |
| December 12, 2026*; 6:00 p.m., ESPNU | | vs. Nebraska | | | | | | T-Mobile Center; Kansas City, MO |
| December 18, 2026*; 5:00 p.m., FS1 | | at Indiana | | | | | | Simon Skjodt Assembly Hall; Bloomington, IN |
| December 20, 2026*; 6:30 p.m., ESPN2 | | vs. Illinois; Braggin' Rights | | | | | | Enterprise Center; St. Louis, MO |
| December 22, 2026*; 7:00 p.m., SECN | | Chicago State | | | | | | Mizzou Arena; Columbia, MO |
SEC regular season
| January 2, 2027; 3:00 p.m., ESPN/ESPN2 | | at Arkansas | | | | | | Bud Walton Arena; Fayetteville, AR |
| January 5, 2027; 8:00 p.m., SECN | | Texas A&M | | | | | | Mizzou Arena; Columbia, MO |
| January 9, 2027; 3:00 p.m., ESPN2 | | Kentucky | | | | | | Mizzou Arena; Columbia, MO |
| January 13, 2027; 6:00 p.m., ESPN/ESPN2/ESPNU | | at Tennessee | | | | | | Thompson–Boling Arena; Knoxville, TN |
| January 16, 2027; 12:00 p.m., SECN | | South Carolina | | | | | | Mizzou Arena; Columbia, MO |
| January 19, 2027; 6:00 p.m., ESPN/ESPN2/ESPNU | | at Oklahoma | | | | | | Lloyd Noble Center; Norman, OK |
| January 23, 2027; 7:00 p.m., ESPN/ESPN2/ESPNU | | at Vanderbilt | | | | | | Memorial Gymnasium; Nashville, TN |
| January 26, 2027; 8:00 p.m., ESPN | | Alabama | | | | | | Mizzou Arena; Columbia, MO |
| January 30, 2027; 5:00 p.m., SECN | | Ole Miss | | | | | | Mizzou Arena; Columbia, MO |
| February 3, 2027; 7:00 p.m., SECN | | at Mississippi State | | | | | | Humphrey Coliseum; Starkville, MS |
| February 6, 2027; 12:00 p.m., SECN | | Tennessee | | | | | | Mizzou Arena; Columbia, MO |
| February 13, 2027; 11:00 a.m., ESPN/ESPN2 | | at Florida | | | | | | O'Connell Center; Gainesville, FL |
| February 16, 2027; 6:00 p.m., SECN | | Oklahoma | | | | | | Mizzou Arena; Columbia, MO |
| February 20, 2027; 11:00 a.m., ESPN | | at Auburn | | | | | | Neville Arena; Auburn, AL |
| February 23, 2027; 6:00 p.m., ESPN/ESPN2/ESPNU | | Arkansas | | | | | | Mizzou Arena; Columbia, MO |
| February 27, 2027; 5:00 p.m., SECN | | at Georgia | | | | | | Stegeman Coliseum; Athens, GA |
| March 2, 2027; 6:00 p.m., ESPN/ESPN2/ESPNU | | at Texas | | | | | | Moody Center; Austin, TX |
| March 6, 2027; 1:00 p.m., SECN | | LSU | | | | | | Mizzou Arena; Columbia, MO |
SEC Tournament
| March 10/11/12, 2027 | | vs. First/Second/Quarterfinal | | | | | | Bridgestone Arena; Nashville, TN |
*Non-conference game. ^{#}Rankings from AP Poll. (#) Tournament seedings in parentheses. All times are in Central Time.

== Rankings ==
Ranking movements Legend: ██ Increase in ranking ██ Decrease in ranking — = Not ranked RV = Received votes
| | Week | | | | | | | | | | | | | | | | | | | | |
| Poll | Pre | 1 | 2 | 3 | 4 | 5 | 6 | 7 | 8 | 9 | 10 | 11 | 12 | 13 | 14 | 15 | 16 | 17 | 18 | 19 | Final |
|---|---|---|---|---|---|---|---|---|---|---|---|---|---|---|---|---|---|---|---|---|---|
| AP | RV | — | — | | | | | | | | | | | | | | | | | | |
| Coaches | RV | — | — | | | | | | | | | | | | | | | | | | |
