= 2026–27 Georgia Bulldogs basketball team =

American college basketball season

2026–27 Georgia Bulldogs basketball
- Conference: Southeastern Conference
- Record: 6–0 (0–0 SEC)
- Head coach: Mike White (5th season)
- Associate head coach: Antonio Reynolds-Dean (5th season)
- Assistant coaches: Todd Abernethy (2nd season); Pat Blake (4th season); Darryl Hardin (3rd season); Jonas Hayes (1st season); Jarvis Hayes (1st season)
- Home arena: Stegeman Coliseum

2026–27 Southeastern Conference men's basketball standings
	Conf.				Overall
Team	W		L	PCT	W		L	PCT
Texas A&M	0	–	0	–	6	–	0	1.000
No. 16 Alabama	0	–	0	–	5	–	0	1.000
Georgia	0	–	0	–	5	–	0	1.000
No. 25 LSU	0	–	0	–	5	–	0	1.000
South Carolina	0	–	0	–	5	–	0	1.000
No. 6 Texas	0	–	0	–	5	–	0	1.000
No. 15 Vanderbilt	0	–	0	–	5	–	0	1.000
Ole Miss	0	–	0	–	4	–	0	1.000
No. 14 Tennessee	0	–	0	–	4	–	0	1.000
No. 1 Florida	0	–	0	–	6	–	1	.857
Kentucky	0	–	0	–	4	–	1	.800
Mississippi State	0	–	0	–	4	–	1	.800
Missouri	0	–	0	–	4	–	1	.800
Oklahoma	0	–	0	–	4	–	1	.800
No. 20 Arkansas	0	–	0	–	3	–	2	.600
Auburn	0	–	0	–	3	–	3	.500
† 2027 SEC tournament winner As of November 21, 2026; Rankings from AP poll

The 2026–27 Georgia Bulldogs basketball team represents the University of Georgia during the 2026–27 NCAA Division I men's basketball season. They are led by fifth-year head coach Mike White and play their home games at the Stegeman Coliseum in Athens, Georgia, as members of the Southeastern Conference.

== Previous season ==
The Bulldogs finished the 2025–26 season 22–11, 10–8 in SEC play to finish in a tie for seventh place. As the No. 7 seed in the SEC tournament, they were defeated by Ole Miss in the second round. The Bulldogs received an at-large bid to the NCAA tournament, marking their second consecutive tournament appearance for the first time since 2001–02. As the No. 8 seed in the Midwest region, they lost to Saint Louis in the first round.

== Offseason ==
=== Departures ===
Georgia departures
Name	Number	Pos.	Height	Weight	Year	Hometown	Reason for departure
Somto Cyril	2	C	6'11"	260	Sophomore	Enugu, Nigeria	Transferred to Miami
Jordan Ross	3	G	6'3"	195	Junior	Pleasant Grove, Utah	Transferred to California
Jeremiah Wilkinson	5	G	6'1"	185	Sophomore	Powder Springs, Georgia	Transferred to Arkansas
Justin Bailey	7	G	6'3"	195	Senior	Greer, South Carolina	Graduated
Dylan James	11	F	6'9"	215	Junior	Winter Haven, Florida	Transferred to George Washington
Jacob Wilkins	21	F	6'9"	185	Freshman	Lilburn, Georgia	Transferred to California
Jackson McVey	22	C	7'1"	240	Freshman	Ellijay, Georgia	Transferred to Georgia Tech
Jaden Newell	24	F	6'8"	225	RS Junior	Destin, Florida	Transferred to Jacksonville
Justin Abson	25	F	6'9"	250	Senior	Pompano Beach, Florida	Transferred to Wake Forest

=== Incoming transfers ===
Georgia incoming transfers
Name	Number	Pos.	Height	Weight	Year	Hometown	Previous school
Freddie Dilione V	5	G	6'5"	190	Senior	Fayetteville, North Carolina	Penn State
James Scott	9	F	6'11"	225	Senior	Fayetteville, North Carolina	Ole Miss
Brady Dunlap	11	F	6'8"	200	Senior	Studio City, California	St. Louis
Andrew Osasuyi	34	F	6'10"	210	Sophomore	Magenta, Italy	St. Bonaventure
Kemauri Millender	55	G	5'11"	165	Senior	Houston, Texas	New Mexico JC

=== Recruiting class ===
==== 2026 recruiting class ====
College recruiting
Name	Hometown	School	Height	Weight	Commit date
Mading Kuany; SF	Melbourne, Australia	Iowa United Prep	6 ft 9 in (2.06 m)	200 lb (91 kg)	May 13, 2026
Mading Kuany; SF	Recruit ratings: Rivals: 247Sports:				
Hakeem Weems; C	Atlanta, Georgia	IMG Academy	6 ft 9 in (2.06 m)	214 lb (97 kg)	May 6, 2026
Hakeem Weems; C	Recruit ratings: Rivals: 247Sports:				
Donovan Williams Jr. G	Orlando, Florida	Oak Ridge High School	6 ft 2 in (1.88 m)	190 lb (86 kg)	May 5, 2026
Donovan Williams Jr. G	Recruit ratings: Rivals: 247Sports: ESPN: (80)				
David Ugonna Ike; C	Owerri, Nigeria	NBA Academy Africa	7 ft 0 in (2.13 m)	250 lb (110 kg)	Apr 16, 2026
David Ugonna Ike; C	Recruit ratings: Rivals: 247Sports:				
Overall recruit ranking: Rivals: 58 247Sports: 35 ESPN: —
Note: In many cases, Scout, Rivals, 247Sports, On3, and ESPN may conflict in their listings of height and weight.; In these cases, the average was taken. ESPN grades are on a 100-point scale.; Sources: "2026 Georgia Bulldogs Recruiting Class". ESPN.; "2026 Team Ranking". Rivals.; "Georgia 2026 Basketball Commits". 247Sports.

== Roster ==
2026–27 Georgia Bulldogs men's basketball team
Players
Coaches

Pos.	#	Name	Height	Weight	Year	Previous school	Hometown
G	0	Blue Cain	6 ft 5 in (1.96 m)	195 lb (88 kg)	Sr	IMG Academy	Knoxville, TN
F	1	Kareem Stagg	6 ft 8 in (2.03 m)	230 lb (104 kg)	So	IMG Academy	Chesapeake, VA
G	2	Donovan Williams Jr.	6 ft 2 in (1.88 m)	190 lb (86 kg)	Fr	Oak Ridge	Orlando, FL
G	4	Marcus Millender	5 ft 11 in (1.8 m)	175 lb (79 kg)	Sr	Clear Brook; UTSA	Houston, TX
G	5	Freddie Dilione V	6 ft 5 in (1.96 m)	190 lb (86 kg)	Sr	Word of God Christian Academy; Penn State	Fayetteville, NC
F	6	Kanon Catchings	6 ft 9 in (2.06 m)	220 lb (100 kg)	Jr	Overtime Elite; BYU	Brownsburg, IN
F	7	Hakeem Weems	6 ft 9 in (2.06 m)	215 lb (98 kg)	Fr	IMG Academy	Atlanta, GA
F	9	James Scott	6 ft 11 in (2.11 m)	225 lb (102 kg)	Sr	E. E. Smith; Ole Miss	Fayetteville, NC
F	11	Brady Dunlap	6 ft 8 in (2.03 m)	200 lb (91 kg)	Sr	Harvard-Westlake; St. Louis	Studio City, CA
G	12	Markel Jennings	5 ft 11 in (1.8 m)	165 lb (75 kg)	Sr	Athens Academy	Watkinsville, GA
F	13	Mading Kuany	6 ft 9 in (2.06 m)	200 lb (91 kg)	Fr	Iowa United Prep	Melbourne, Australia
C	16	David Ugonna Ike	7 ft 0 in (2.13 m)	250 lb (113 kg)	Fr	NBA Academy Africa	Owerri, Nigeria
G	30	Brandon Klatsky	6 ft 4 in (1.93 m)	175 lb (79 kg)	GS	Ranney School	Colts Neck, NJ
F	34	Andrew Osasuyi	6 ft 10 in (2.08 m)	210 lb (95 kg)	So	College Basket Borgomanero; St. Bonaventure	Magenta, Italy
G	55	Kemauri Millender	5 ft 11 in (1.8 m)	165 lb (75 kg)	Sr	Clear Brook; New Mexico JC	Houston, TX

Head coach

- Mike White (Ole Miss)

Assistant coach(es)

- Antonio Reynolds Dean (Rhode Island)
- Todd Abernethy (Mississippi)
- Pat Blake (Mississippi)
- Darryl Hardin (Florida State)
- Jonas Hayes (Georgia)
- Jarvis Hayes (Georgia)

Legend

- (C) Team captain
- (S) Suspended
- (I) Ineligible
- (W) Walk-on
- Injured
- Current redshirt

Roster
Last update: October 4, 2026

== Schedule and results ==
Date time, TV	Rank^{#}	Opponent^{#}	Result	Record	High points	High rebounds	High assists	Site (attendance) city, state
Exhibition
October 7, 2026*; 7:00 p.m.		Georgia State	W 94–61	–	14 – Dilione V	7 – Cain	5 – M. Millender	Stegeman Coliseum; Athens, GA
October 16, 2026*; 7:00 p.m.		Charlotte	W 87–67	–	14 – Cain	7 – Stagg	8 – M. Millender	Stegeman Coliseum; Athens, GA
October 23, 2026*; 6:30 p.m.		at Clemson	L 80–82	–	19 – Catchings	8 – Scott	4 – M. Millender	Littlejohn Coliseum (6,435); Clemson, SC
Non-conference regular season
November 2, 2026*; 7:30 p.m., SECN+		North Carolina Central	W 78–62	1–0	16 – Catchings	6 – Tied	4 – M. Millender	Stegeman Coliseum (5,553); Athens, GA
November 6, 2026*; 7:00 p.m., SECN+		Presbyterian	W 91–77	2–0	20 – Cain	9 – Osasuyi	4 – Dilione V	Stegeman Coliseum (5,777); Athens, GA
November 9, 2026*; 7:00 p.m., SECN+		Florida Gulf Coast	W 80–72	3–0	13 – Tied	7 – Tied	6 – M. Millender	Stegeman Coliseum (5,228); Athens, GA
November 13, 2026*; 7:00 p.m., ESPN2		at North Carolina	W 78–70	4–0	22 – Catchings	11 – Catchings	3 – Catchings	Dean Smith Center (16,041); Chapel Hill, NC
November 16, 2026*; 7:00 p.m., SECN		Jacksonville	W 107–62	5–0	21 – Stagg	9 – Cain	5 – Cain	Stegeman Coliseum (5,746); Athens, GA
November 20, 2026*; 8:00 p.m., ESPNU		at Georgia Tech; Clean, Old-Fashioned Hate	W 88–82	6–0	19 – Catchings	9 – Catchings	3 – M. Millender	McCamish Pavilion (8,600); Atlanta, GA
November 26, 2026*; 11:00 a.m., ESPN		vs. Cincinnati; ESPN Events Invitational Magic Group						State Farm Field House; Kissimmee, FL
November 27, 2026*; 7:00 p.m., ESPN2		vs. UCF; ESPN Events Invitational Magic Group						State Farm Field House; Kissimmee, FL
December 1, 2026*; 5:00 p.m., ESPN2		Boston College; ACC–SEC Challenge						Stegeman Coliseum; Athens, GA
December 8, 2026*; 9:00 p.m., ESPN		vs. Duke; Jimmy V Classic						Madison Square Garden; New York, NY
December 13, 2026*; 2:00 p.m., SECN+		Alabama A&M						Stegeman Coliseum; Athens, GA
December 16, 2026*; 6:00 p.m., SECN		West Georgia						Stegeman Coliseum; Athens, GA
December 20, 2026*; 2:00 p.m., SECN		Gardner–Webb						Stegeman Coliseum; Athens, GA
December 29, 2026*; 7:00 p.m., SECN+		North Florida						Stegeman Coliseum; Athens, GA
SEC regular season
January 2, 2027; 1:00 p.m., SECN		at Ole Miss						SJB Pavilion; Oxford, MS
January 5, 2027; 9:00 p.m., ESPN/ESPNU		Texas						Stegeman Coliseum; Athens, GA
January 9, 2027; 1:00 p.m., SECN		at Auburn						Neville Arena; Auburn, AL
January 12, 2027; 7:00 p.m., SECN		Oklahoma						Stegeman Coliseum; Athens, GA
January 16, 2027; 3:30 p.m., SECN		Mississippi State						Stegeman Coliseum; Athens, GA
January 19, 2027; 9:00 p.m., ESPNU		at Arkansas						Bud Walton Arena; Fayetteville, AR
January 23, 2027; 4:00 p.m., ESPN/ESPN2/ESPNU		Florida						Stegeman Coliseum; Athens, GA
January 30, 2027; 3:30 p.m., SECN		LSU						Stegeman Coliseum; Athens, GA
February 3, 2027; 7:00 p.m., ESPN2		at Tennessee						Thompson–Boling Arena; Knoxville, TN
February 6, 2027; 8:30 p.m., SECN		at South Carolina						Colonial Life Arena; Columbia, SC
February 9, 2027; 7:00 p.m., SECN		Vanderbilt						Stegeman Coliseum; Athens, GA
February 13, 2027; 3:30 p.m., SECN		at Texas A&M						Reed Arena; College Station, TX
February 16, 2027; 7:00 p.m., ESPN/ESPN2		Kentucky						Stegeman Coliseum; Athens, GA
February 20, 2027; 8:30 p.m., SECN		at Florida						O'Connell Center; Gainesville, FL
February 24, 2027; 9:00 p.m., SECN		at Oklahoma						Lloyd Noble Center; Norman, OK
February 27, 2027; 6:00 p.m., SECN		Missouri						Stegeman Coliseum; Athens, GA
March 3, 2027; 7:00 p.m., ESPN2/ESPNU		at Alabama						Coleman Coliseum; Tuscaloosa, AL
March 6, 2027; 12:00 p.m., SECN		South Carolina						Stegeman Coliseum; Athens, GA
SEC tournament
March 10–12; TBD, TBD		vs. TBD						Bridgestone Arena; Nashville, TN
*Non-conference game. ^{#}Rankings from AP Poll. (#) Tournament seedings in parentheses. All times are in Eastern Time.
