= 2026–27 LSU Tigers men's basketball team =

American college basketball season

2026–27 LSU Tigers men's basketball
- Conference: Southeastern Conference

Ranking
- Coaches: No. 25
- AP: No. 25
- Record: 6–0 (0–0 SEC)
- Head coach: Will Wade (2nd stint, 6th season)
- Associate head coach: Rick Stansbury (1st season)
- Assistant coaches: Johnny Jones (2nd stint, 14th season); Damon Stoudamire (1st season); Vernon Hamilton (1st season)
- Home arena: Pete Maravich Assembly Center

2026–27 Southeastern Conference men's basketball standings
	Conf.				Overall
Team	W		L	PCT	W		L	PCT
Georgia	0	–	0	–	6	–	0	1.000
Texas A&M	0	–	0	–	6	–	0	1.000
No. 15 Vanderbilt	0	–	0	–	6	–	0	1.000
No. 16 Alabama	0	–	0	–	5	–	0	1.000
No. 25 LSU	0	–	0	–	5	–	0	1.000
South Carolina	0	–	0	–	5	–	0	1.000
No. 14 Tennessee	0	–	0	–	5	–	0	1.000
No. 6 Texas	0	–	0	–	5	–	0	1.000
Ole Miss	0	–	0	–	4	–	0	1.000
No. 1 Florida	0	–	0	–	6	–	1	.857
Mississippi State	0	–	0	–	5	–	1	.833
Missouri	0	–	0	–	5	–	1	.833
Oklahoma	0	–	0	–	4	–	1	.800
No. 20 Arkansas	0	–	0	–	4	–	2	.667
Kentucky	0	–	0	–	4	–	2	.667
Auburn	0	–	0	–	3	–	3	.500
† 2027 SEC tournament winner As of November 22, 2026; Rankings from AP poll

The 2026–27 LSU Tigers men's basketball team represents Louisiana State University during the 2026–27 NCAA Division I men's basketball season as members of the Southeastern Conference (SEC). The Tigers play their home games at Pete Maravich Assembly Center in Baton Rouge, Louisiana, and are led by Will Wade in the first year of his second stint as head coach. Johnny Jones also rejoined LSU as an assistant coach for his 23rd total season with the program, including five as the head coach.

== Previous season ==
The Tigers finished the 2025–26 season 15–17 and 3–15 in SEC play, finishing last in the conference. They lost to the Kentucky Wildcats in the first round of the SEC tournament.

Following the season, head coach Matt McMahon was fired after four seasons, finishing his tenure with a 60–70 overall record Former Tigers head coach Will Wade was re-hired the same day, returning after previously being dismissed over NCAA violations in 2022.

== Offseason ==
=== Departures ===
LSU departures
Name	Number	Pos.	Height	Weight	Year	Hometown	Reason for Departure
Mazi Mosley	0	G	6'5"	169	Freshman	Los Angeles, CA	Transferred to Loyola Marymount
Mike Nwoko	1	F	6'10"	261	Junior	Toronto, ON	Transferred to Xavier
Jalen Reece	2	G	6'0"	185	Freshman	Orlando, FL	Transferred to Texas A&M
Max Mackinnon	3	G	6'6"	195	Senior	Brisbane, Australia	Graduated
Rashad King	4	G	6'6"	217	Senior	Evans, GA	Graduated
Marcus Vaughns	5	F	6'8"	221	Freshman	Melbourne, Australia	Transferred to Arizona State
Robert Miller III	6	F	6'10"	230	Sophomore	Houston, TX	Transferred to Miami (FL)
PJ Carter	7	G	6'4"	183	Senior	Atlanta, GA	Graduated
Pablo Tamba	8	F	6'7"	206	Graduate student	Málaga, Spain	Graduated
Jalen Reed	9	F	6'10"	245	(redshirt) Junior	Jackson, MS	Transferred to Michigan
Marquel Sutton	10	F	6'9"	225	Senior	Tulsa, OK	Graduated
Dedan Thomas Jr.	11	G	6'1"	178	Junior	Las Vegas, NV	Transferred to Houston
Matt Gilhool	13	F	6'11"	213	Freshman	Elizabethtown, PA	Transferred to Kansas State
Jaden Bobbett	14	G	6'1"	190	Senior	Rye, NH	Graduated
Ron Zipper	16	G	6'5"	209	Freshman	Ashkelon, Israel	Transferred

=== Incoming transfers ===
LSU incoming transfers
Name	Number	Pos.	Height	Weight	Year	Hometown	Previous School
Luke Stansbury	0	G	6'3"	185	Senior	Bowling Green, KY	Stephen F. Austin
Abdi Bashir Jr.	1	G	6'5"	170	Senior	Omaha, NE	Kansas State
Austin Nunez	2	G	6'2"	185	(redshirt) Senior	San Antonio, TX	UTSA
Donovan Dent	3	G	6'2"	185	Graduate Student	Riverside, CA	UCLA
Mouhamed Dioubate	10	F	6'8"	235	Senior	Flushing, NY	Kentucky
RJ Luis Jr.	12	G	6'7"	220	Graduate Student	Miami, FL	St. John's (2024–25)
Skyy Clark	55	G	6'2"	215	Graduate Student	Los Angeles, CA	UCLA
Divine Ugochukwu	99	G	6'3"	200	Junior	Sugar Land, TX	Michigan State

=== 2026 Recruiting class ===
==== High school ====
College recruiting
Name	Hometown	School	Height	Weight	Commit date
Jordan Bender; F	Louisville, KY	Northside Christian (FL)	6 ft 7 in (2.01 m)	200 lb (91 kg)	Jun 18, 2026
Jordan Bender; F	Recruit ratings: No ratings found				
Bradley Fife; G	Baton Rouge, LA	Catholic	5 ft 10 in (1.78 m)	150 lb (68 kg)	(walk-on)
Bradley Fife; G	Recruit ratings: No ratings found				
Strake Pearson; C	Prosper, TX	IMG Academy	7 ft 0 in (2.13 m)	235 lb (107 kg)	(walk-on)
Strake Pearson; C	Recruit ratings: No ratings found				
Overall recruit ranking:
Note: In many cases, Scout, Rivals, 247Sports, On3, and ESPN may conflict in their listings of height and weight.; In these cases, the average was taken. ESPN grades are on a 100-point scale.; Sources: "LSU 2026 Basketball Commitments". Rivals.; "ESPN". ESPN.; "2026 Team Ranking". Rivals.

==== International ====
College recruiting
Name	Hometown	School	Height	Weight	Commit date
Brice Dessert; C	Pontoise, France	Lycée Marcelin Berthelot	6 ft 11 in (2.11 m)	255 lb (116 kg)	May 21, 2026 (age 23)
Brice Dessert; C	Recruit ratings: No ratings found				
Gilad Levy; C	Tel Aviv, Israel	Ibn Gabirol	7 ft 3 in (2.21 m)	275 lb (125 kg)	August 25, 2026 (age 24)
Gilad Levy; C	Recruit ratings: No ratings found				
Saliou Niang; SF	Mandello del Lario, Italy	LLS Aldini Valeriani	6 ft 7 in (2.01 m)	200 lb (91 kg)	May 19, 2026 (age 22)
Saliou Niang; SF	Recruit ratings: No ratings found				
Michael Ružić; C	Zadar, Croatia	E-Gimnazija	7 ft 0 in (2.13 m)	235 lb (107 kg)	May 20, 2026 (age 19)
Michael Ružić; C	Recruit ratings: No ratings found				
Overall recruit ranking:
Note: In many cases, Scout, Rivals, 247Sports, On3, and ESPN may conflict in their listings of height and weight.; In these cases, the average was taken. ESPN grades are on a 100-point scale.; Sources: "LSU 2026 Basketball Commitments". Rivals.; "ESPN". ESPN.; "2026 Team Ranking". Rivals.

== Roster ==
2026–27 LSU Tigers men's basketball team
Players
Coaches

Pos.	#	Name	Height	Weight	Year	Previous school	Hometown
G	0	Luke Stansbury (W)	6 ft 3 in (1.91 m)	185 lb (84 kg)	Sr	Stephen F. Austin	Bowling Green, KY
G	1	Abdi Bashir Jr.	6 ft 5 in (1.96 m)	170 lb (77 kg)	Sr	Kansas State	Omaha, NE
G	2	Austin Nunez (injured)	6 ft 2 in (1.88 m)	175 lb (79 kg)	GS	Texas–San Antonio	San Antonio, TX
G	3	Donovan Dent	6 ft 2 in (1.88 m)	185 lb (84 kg)	GS	UCLA	Riverside, CA
G	4	Bradley Fife (W)	5 ft 10 in (1.78 m)	150 lb (68 kg)	Fr	Catholic HS	Baton Rouge, LA
F	5	Jordan Bender	6 ft 7 in (2.01 m)	200 lb (91 kg)	Fr	Northside Christian HS (FL)	Louisville, KY
F	7	Saliou Niang	6 ft 7 in (2.01 m)	200 lb (91 kg)	GS	Virtus Bologna	Mandello del Lario, Italy
F	10	Mouhamed Dioubate	6 ft 8 in (2.03 m)	235 lb (107 kg)	Sr	Kentucky	Queens, NY
G	12	RJ Luis Jr.	6 ft 7 in (2.01 m)	220 lb (100 kg)	GS	St. John's	Miami, FL
C	13	Brice Dessert	6 ft 11 in (2.11 m)	255 lb (116 kg)	GS	Anadolu Efes S.K.	Pontoise, France
C	18	Gilad Levy	7 ft 3 in (2.21 m)	275 lb (125 kg)	GS	Palencia Baloncesto	Tel Aviv, Israel
C	22	Strake Pearson (W)	7 ft 0 in (2.13 m)	260 lb (118 kg)	Fr	IMG Academy	Prosper, TX
C	32	Michael Ružić	7 ft 0 in (2.13 m)	235 lb (107 kg)	Fr	Joventut Badalona	Zadar, Croatia
G	55	Skyy Clark	6 ft 2 in (1.88 m)	215 lb (98 kg)	GS	UCLA	Los Angeles, CA
G	99	Divine Ugochukwu	6 ft 3 in (1.91 m)	200 lb (91 kg)	Jr	Michigan State	Sugar Land, TX

Head coach

- Will Wade (Clemson)

Assistant coach(es)

- Rick Stansbury - associate head coach (Campbellsville)
- Johnny Jones (LSU)
- Damon Stoudamire (Arizona)
- Vernon Hamilton (Clemson)

Legend

- (C) Team captain
- (S) Suspended
- (I) Ineligible
- (W) Walk-on
- Injured
- Current redshirt

Roster
Last update: October 21, 2026

== Schedule and results ==
Date time, TV	Rank^{#}	Opponent^{#}	Result	Record	High points	High rebounds	High assists	Site (attendance) city, state
Exhibition
October 8, 2026*; 6:30 p.m.		at McNeese	W 63–60	—	18 – Ugochukwu	16 – Ružić	3 – Bashir Jr.	Townsley Law Arena (4,424); Lake Charles, LA
October 14, 2026*; 7:00 p.m., SECN+		UCF	W 85–81	—	26 – Bashir Jr.	13 – Ružić	11 – Dent	Pete Maravich Assembly Center (1,772); Baton Rouge, LA
October 24, 2026*; 12:00 p.m., ACCNX		at Florida State	L 87–89	—	24 – Dent	8 – Clark	9 – Dent	Donald L. Tucker Center (5,043); Tallahassee, FL
Non-conference regular season
November 3, 2026*; 7:00 p.m., SECN+		LSU New Orleans	W 100–57	1–0	19 – Dent	14 – Niang	10 – Dent	Pete Maravich Assembly Center (7,919); Baton Rouge, LA
November 6, 2026*; 7:00 p.m., SECN+		Texas Southern	W 92–51	2–0	15 – Tied	11 – Tied	10 – Dent	Pete Maravich Assembly Center (7,732); Baton Rouge, LA
November 9, 2026*; 7:00 p.m., SECN+		Louisiana Tech	W 90–50	3–0	18 – Ružić	6 – Tied	5 – Dent	Pete Maravich Assembly Center (7,802); Baton Rouge, LA
November 14, 2026*; 2:30 p.m., USA		vs. No. 14 Gonzaga; Bad Boy Mower Series – Spokane	W 81–80	4–0	23 – Dent	12 – Ružić	10 – Dent	Numerica Veterans Arena (12,000); Spokane, WA
November 18, 2026*; 7:00 p.m., SECN+	No. 25	Louisiana–Monroe	W 79–67	5–0	16 – Dioubate	9 – Tied	10 – Dent	Pete Maravich Assembly Center (7,591); Baton Rouge, LA
November 21, 2026*; 12:00 p.m., SECN+	No. 25	Queens	W 106–75	6–0	20 – Dent	7 – Dioubate	10 – Dent	Pete Maravich Assembly Center (7,327); Baton Rouge, LA
November 25, 2026*; 1:00 p.m., CBSSN		vs. Arizona State; Acrisure Series Pod 1						Acrisure Arena; Palm Springs, CA
November 26, 2026*; 6:00 p.m., CBSSN		vs. SMU; Acrisure Series Pod 1						Acrisure Arena; Palm Springs, CA
December 1, 2026*; 8:00 p.m., SECN		Wake Forest; ACC–SEC Challenge						Pete Maravich Assembly Center; Baton Rouge, LA
December 5, 2026*; 1:00 p.m., SECN+		Hofstra						Pete Maravich Assembly Center; Baton Rouge, LA
December 13, 2026*; 2:30 p.m., ESPN		vs. Houston						Toyota Center; Houston, TX
December 18, 2026*; 7:00 p.m., SECN+		High Point						Pete Maravich Assembly Center; Baton Rouge, LA
December 22, 2026*; 5:00 p.m., SECN		Louisiana						Pete Maravich Assembly Center; Baton Rouge, LA
December 28, 2026*; 7:00 p.m., SECN+		Washington State						Pete Maravich Assembly Center; Baton Rouge, LA
SEC regular season
January 2, 2027; 2:30 p.m., SECN		South Carolina						Pete Maravich Assembly Center; Baton Rouge, LA
January 5, 2027; 6:00 p.m., SECN		at Alabama						Coleman Coliseum; Tuscaloosa, AL
January 9, 2027; 7:30 p.m., SECN		Tennessee						Pete Maravich Assembly Center; Baton Rouge, LA
January 13, 2027; 6:00 p.m., SECN		at Kentucky						Rupp Arena; Lexington, KY
January 16, 2027; 5:00 p.m., SECN		at Texas A&M						Reed Arena; College Station, TX
January 19, 2027; 8:00 p.m., SECN		Texas						Pete Maravich Assembly Center; Baton Rouge, LA
January 23, 2027; 2:30 p.m., SECN		Auburn						Pete Maravich Assembly Center; Baton Rouge, LA
January 26, 2027; 8:00 p.m., SECN		at Arkansas						Bud Walton Arena; Fayetteville, AR
January 30, 2027; 2:30 p.m., SECN		at Georgia						Stegeman Coliseum; Athens, GA
February 2, 2027; 8:00 p.m., ESPNU		Vanderbilt						Pete Maravich Assembly Center; Baton Rouge, LA
February 6, 2027; 3:00 p.m., ESPN2		Ole Miss						Pete Maravich Assembly Center; Baton Rouge, LA
February 13, 2027; 12:00 p.m., SECN		at Oklahoma						Lloyd Noble Center; Norman, OK
February 17, 2027; 7:00 p.m., SECN		Florida						Pete Maravich Assembly Center; Baton Rouge, LA
February 20, 2027; 5:00 p.m., SECN		at Mississippi State						Humphrey Coliseum; Starkville, MS
February 24, 2027; 6:00 p.m., SECN		at Auburn						Neville Arena; Auburn, AL
February 27, 2027; 7:30 p.m., SECN		Texas A&M						Pete Maravich Assembly Center; Baton Rouge, LA
March 2, 2027; 8:00 p.m., ESPNU		Arkansas						Pete Maravich Assembly Center; Baton Rouge, LA
March 6, 2027; 1:00 p.m., SECN		at Missouri						Mizzou Arena; Columbia, MO
*Non-conference game. ^{#}Rankings from AP Poll. (#) Tournament seedings in parentheses. All times are in Central Time.

Schedule Source:

== Rankings ==
Ranking movements Legend: ██ Increase in ranking ██ Decrease in ranking — = Not ranked RV = Received votes
	Week																				
Poll	Pre	1	2	3	4	5	6	7	8	9	10	11	12	13	14	15	16	17	18	19	Final
AP	—	—	25																		
Coaches	—	RV	25																		
