= 2026–27 South Carolina Gamecocks men's basketball team =

American college basketball season

2026–27 South Carolina Gamecocks men's basketball
- Conference: Southeastern Conference
- Record: 4–0 (0–0 SEC)
- Head coach: Lamont Paris (5th season)
- Assistant coaches: Tanner Bronson; Bob Donewald Jr.; Steve Smith; David McKinley; Sam Dekker
- Home arena: Colonial Life Arena

2026–27 Southeastern Conference men's basketball standings
	Conf.				Overall
Team	W		L	PCT	W		L	PCT
No. 16 Alabama	0	–	0	–	4	–	0	1.000
No. 1 Florida	0	–	0	–	4	–	0	1.000
Georgia	0	–	0	–	4	–	0	1.000
No. 25 LSU	0	–	0	–	4	–	0	1.000
South Carolina	0	–	0	–	4	–	0	1.000
No. 6 Texas	0	–	0	–	4	–	0	1.000
Texas A&M	0	–	0	–	4	–	0	1.000
No. 15 Vanderbilt	0	–	0	–	4	–	0	1.000
Ole Miss	0	–	0	–	3	–	0	1.000
No. 14 Tennessee	0	–	0	–	3	–	0	1.000
No. 20 Arkansas	0	–	0	–	3	–	1	.750
Mississippi State	0	–	0	–	3	–	1	.750
Missouri	0	–	0	–	3	–	1	.750
Oklahoma	0	–	0	–	3	–	1	.750
Auburn	0	–	0	–	2	–	1	.667
Kentucky	0	–	0	–	2	–	1	.667
† 2027 SEC tournament winner As of November 17, 2026; Rankings from AP poll

The 2026–27 South Carolina Gamecocks men's basketball team represents the University of South Carolina during the 2026–27 NCAA Division I men's basketball season. The Gamecocks, led by fifth-year head coach Lamont Paris, play their home games at Colonial Life Arena in Columbia, South Carolina, as a member of the Southeastern Conference.

== Previous season ==
The Gamecocks finished the 2025–26 season 13–19, 4–14 in SEC play, to finish in 15th place. As the No. 14 seed in the SEC tournament, they lost to No. 11 seed Oklahoma 86–74 in the first round.

== Offseason ==
=== Coaching changes ===
On March 10, 2026, before the SEC tournament, the school confirmed that Paris would return for a fifth season. He had a 62–67 record through four seasons, including the program's 2024 NCAA tournament appearance, and the team had gone 25–38 since that run. Firing him would have cost a buyout of about $12 million.

Paris then added three assistant coaches. On April 10 he hired Bob Donewald Jr., who had spent the previous six seasons on Chris Beard's staffs at Texas Tech, Texas and Ole Miss. On May 15 he hired former NBA player Sam Dekker, who had played for Wisconsin from 2012 to 2015 while Paris was an assistant there. Dekker's focus is on-court player development. On June 2 he hired Steve Smith, a South Carolina native who had spent the previous two seasons as an assistant at Boston College and five before that at Florida State.

=== Roster turnover ===
Only three players returned from the 2025–26 team: Hayden Assemian, Grant Polk and Eli Sparkman. Meechie Johnson, who led the team with 17.2 points per game, ran out of eligibility. He and Mike Sharavjamts were among the team's key departures. Elijah Strong was the first Gamecock to enter the transfer portal, on March 20, and Eli Ellis and Jordan Butler followed within days. In all, eight players transferred to other Division I programs.

On April 29, Paris announced five transfers: forward Aleksas Bieliauskas from Wisconsin, guard Shane Blakeney from Drexel, forward Camden Heide from Texas, guard Kory Mincy from George Mason and forward Jakub Nečas from Duquesne. Blakeney, a Rock Hill native, had been named second-team All-CAA after leading Drexel with 14.2 points per game. Mincy averaged 14.3 points and made the All-Atlantic 10 second team, and Heide's 45.4 percent three-point shooting at Texas led all SEC players. On May 6, the Gamecocks added guard Davion Hannah, a former top-50 recruit who had played 10 games as a freshman at Alabama.

South Carolina also signed two international players with professional experience. On June 15 it announced Juan Fernández, a 6-foot-11 Argentine forward who had spent five seasons in Spain's Liga ACB, most recently with Bàsquet Girona. Spanish forward Hugo López followed. On June 19 the school added Mathias Alessanco, Nasir Hines and Ford Wilder, completing a 15-man roster with 12 newcomers. Alessanco, a Brazilian forward from Overtime Elite, is redshirting the season while he recovers from a torn anterior cruciate ligament.

=== Departures ===
South Carolina departures
Name	Number	Pos.	Height	Weight	Year	Hometown	Reason for Departure
Jordan Butler	0	F	7'0"	237	Junior	Greenville, South Carolina	Transferred to Furman
Christ Essandoko	2	F	7'0"	280	Junior	Clichy, France	Transferred to Bowling Green
Kobe Knox	4	G	6'5"	200	Senior	Tampa, Florida	Graduated
Meechie Johnson	5	G	6'2"	192	Senior	Cleveland, Ohio	Out of eligibility
EJ Walker	6	F	6'7"	253	Freshman	Florence, Kentucky	Transferred to Western Kentucky
Abu Yarmah	7	G	6'6"	209	Freshman	Roanoke, Virginia	Transferred to Longwood
Myles Stute	10	G	6'7"	221	Graduate Student	Washington, D.C.	Graduated
Eli Ellis	15	G	6'0"	192	Freshman	Hickory, North Carolina	Transferred to Charleston
Cam Scott	23	G	6'6"	172	Sophomore	Lexington, South Carolina	Transferred to Temple
Nordin Kapic	24	F	6'8"	240	Senior	Vienna, Austria	Transferred to Campbell
Elijah Strong	31	F	6'8"	250	Junior	Charlotte, North Carolina	Transferred to Saint Louis
Mike Sharavjamts	55	G	6'9"	195	Senior	Ulaanbaatar, Mongolia	Graduated

=== Incoming transfers ===
South Carolina incoming transfers
Name	Number	Pos.	Height	Weight	Year	Hometown	Previous School
Shane Blakeney	4	G	6'5"	197	Graduate Student	Rock Hill, South Carolina	Drexel
Jakub Nečas	7	F	6'10"	240	Senior	Blansko, Czech Republic	Duquesne
Kory Mincy	8	G	6'1"	185	Senior	Atlanta, Georgia	George Mason
Nasir Hines	12	F	6'10"	200	Sophomore	Cleveland, Ohio	Palm Beach State College
Camden Heide	23	F	6'7"	215	Graduate Student	Wayzata, Minnesota	Texas
Davion Hannah	25	G	6'6"	190	Sophomore	Milwaukee, Wisconsin	Alabama
Aleksas Bieliauskas	32	F	6'11"	250	Sophomore	Kaunas, Lithuania	Wisconsin

=== 2026 recruiting class ===
South Carolina 2026 recruiting class
Name	Number	Pos.	Height	Weight	Hometown	High school
Marcus Johnson	1	G	6'2"	185	Cleveland, Ohio	Garfield Heights
Ford Wilder	15	G	6'4"	190	Sumter, South Carolina	Wilson Hall
Mathias Alessanco	17	F	6'8"	235	Joinville, Brazil	Overtime Elite

Johnson, the cousin of Meechie Johnson, signed with South Carolina in November 2025 and was named Ohio Mr. Basketball in both 2025 and 2026.

== Preseason ==
On October 12, 2026, the SEC released its preseason media poll. South Carolina was picked to finish last in the conference. "It's completely irrelevant to me," Paris said of the prediction, adding that it could motivate his players. The Gamecocks won both of their preseason exhibitions. They beat Wake Forest 78–69 in Rock Hill on October 15, when Nečas scored 22 points, and Campbell 77–68 at home on October 25, when Fernández scored 28.

=== Preseason rankings ===
SEC Preseason Media Poll
Place	Team
1	Florida
2	Texas
3	Arkansas
4	Tennessee
5	Alabama
6	Vanderbilt
7	Kentucky
8	Missouri
9	Texas A&M
10	Auburn
11	Georgia
12	Oklahoma
13	Ole Miss
14	LSU
15	Mississippi State
16	South Carolina

== Roster ==
2026–27 South Carolina Gamecocks men's basketball team
Players
Coaches

Pos.	#	Name	Height	Weight	Year	Previous school	Hometown
G	1	Marcus Johnson	6 ft 2 in (1.88 m)	185 lb (84 kg)	Fr	Garfield Heights HS	Cleveland, OH
G	4	Shane Blakeney	6 ft 5 in (1.96 m)	197 lb (89 kg)		Legion Collegiate Academy; Drexel	Rock Hill, SC
F	7	Jakub Nečas	6 ft 10 in (2.08 m)	240 lb (109 kg)	Sr	Gymnázium Blansko; Duquesne	Blansko, Czech Republic
G	8	Kory Mincy	6 ft 1 in (1.85 m)	185 lb (84 kg)	Sr	Tri-Cities HS; George Mason	Atlanta, GA
F	12	Nasir Hines	6 ft 10 in (2.08 m)	200 lb (91 kg)	So	Garfield Heights HS; Palm Beach State	Cleveland, OH
G	13	Grant Polk	6 ft 6 in (1.98 m)	200 lb (91 kg)	So	St. Albans	Gainesville, VA
G	14	Eli Sparkman	6 ft 0 in (1.83 m)	172 lb (78 kg)		Baylor School	Cleveland, TN
G	15	Ford Wilder	6 ft 4 in (1.93 m)	190 lb (86 kg)	Fr	Wilson Hall	Sumter, SC
F	17	Mathias Alessanco	6 ft 8 in (2.03 m)	235 lb (107 kg)	RS Fr	Overtime Elite	Joinville, Brazil
F	19	Hugo López	6 ft 9 in (2.06 m)	210 lb (95 kg)		Madrid, Spain
F	20	Hayden Assemian	6 ft 6 in (1.98 m)	228 lb (103 kg)	So	Moravian Prep	Greenville, SC
F	21	Juan Fernández	6 ft 11 in (2.11 m)	220 lb (100 kg)		Bàsquet Girona	Santa Fe, Argentina
F	23	Camden Heide	6 ft 7 in (2.01 m)	215 lb (98 kg)		Wayzata HS; Texas	Wayzata, MN
G	25	Davion Hannah	6 ft 6 in (1.98 m)	190 lb (86 kg)	So	Link Academy; Alabama	Milwaukee, WI
F	32	Aleksas Bieliauskas	6 ft 11 in (2.11 m)	250 lb (113 kg)	So	Wisconsin	Kaunas, Lithuania

Head coach

- Lamont Paris (Wooster)

Assistant coach(es)

- Tanner Bronson (Wisconsin)
- Bob Donewald Jr. (Western Michigan)
- Steve Smith
- David McKinley (Ohio)
- Sam Dekker (Wisconsin)

Legend

- (C) Team captain
- (S) Suspended
- (I) Ineligible
- (W) Walk-on
- Injured
- Current redshirt

Roster
Last update: November 13, 2026

== Schedule and results ==
Date time, TV	Rank^{#}	Opponent^{#}	Result	Record	High points	High rebounds	High assists	Site (attendance) city, state
Exhibition
October 15, 2026*; 6:00 p.m.		vs. Wake Forest; The Scout Exhibition	W 78–69	–	22 – Nečas	–	–	Rock Hill Sports & Event Center; Rock Hill, SC
October 25, 2026*; 2:00 p.m.		Campbell	W 77–68	–	28 – Fernández	–	–	Colonial Life Arena; Columbia, SC
Non-conference regular season
November 3, 2026*; 7:00 p.m., SECN+		Stetson	W 81–55	1–0	20 – Fernández	9 – Hannah	5 – Mincy	Colonial Life Arena (12,113); Columbia, SC
November 8, 2026*; 1:00 p.m., SECN+		Southeast Missouri State	W 78–68	2–0	19 – Mincy	7 – Fernández	3 – Nečas	Colonial Life Arena (9,580); Columbia, SC
November 11, 2026*; 7:00 p.m., SECN+		Saint Peter's	W 77–41	3–0	20 – Johnson	6 – Hannah	6 – Johnson	Colonial Life Arena (11,456); Columbia, SC
November 14, 2026*; 2:00 p.m., SECN+		Gardner–Webb	W 79–62	4–0	23 – Bieliauskas	5 – Tied	5 – Nečas	Colonial Life Arena (10,461); Columbia, SC
November 18, 2026*; 7:00 p.m., SECN		Elon						Colonial Life Arena; Columbia, SC
November 25, 2026*; 4:30 p.m., CBSSN		vs. USC; Acrisure Series Pod 1						Acrisure Arena; Palm Springs, CA
November 26, 2026*; 2:00 p.m.		vs. Arizona State; Acrisure Series Pod 1						Acrisure Arena; Palm Springs, CA
December 1, 2026*; 7:00 p.m., ACCN		at NC State; SEC/ACC Challenge						Lenovo Center; Raleigh, NC
December 6, 2026*; 12:00 p.m., SECN+		UT Martin						Colonial Life Arena; Columbia, SC
December 12, 2026*; 4:00 p.m., SECN+		Youngstown State						Colonial Life Arena; Columbia, SC
December 15, 2026*; 9:00 p.m., ESPN2		Clemson						Colonial Life Arena; Columbia, SC
December 19, 2026*; 1:00 p.m., FS1		vs. Maryland; Battle in Baltimore						CFG Bank Arena; Baltimore, MD
December 22, 2026*; 4:00 p.m.		North Carolina Central						Colonial Life Arena; Columbia, SC
December 29, 2026*; 4:00 p.m., SECN+		South Carolina State						Colonial Life Arena; Columbia, SC
SEC regular season
January 2, 2027; 3:30 p.m., SECN		at LSU						Pete Maravich Assembly Center; Baton Rouge, LA
January 6, 2027; 9:00 p.m., SECN		Arkansas						Colonial Life Arena; Columbia, SC
January 9, 2027; 3:30 p.m., SECN		Texas A&M						Colonial Life Arena; Columbia, SC
January 12, 2027; 9:00 p.m., SECN		at Vanderbilt						Memorial Gymnasium; Nashville, TN
January 16, 2027; 1:00 p.m., SECN		at Missouri						Mizzou Arena; Columbia, MO
January 20, 2027; 6:00 p.m., SECN		Alabama						Colonial Life Arena; Columbia, SC
January 23, 2027; 1:00 p.m., SECN		at Mississippi State						Humphrey Coliseum; Starkville, MS
January 27, 2027; 8:00 p.m., SECN		Texas						Colonial Life Arena; Columbia, SC
January 30, 2027; 1:00 p.m., SECN		at Oklahoma						Lloyd Noble Center; Norman, OK
February 2, 2027; 7:00 p.m., SECN		at Florida						O'Connell Center; Gainesville, FL
February 6, 2027; 8:30 p.m., SECN		Georgia						Colonial Life Arena; Columbia, SC
February 10, 2027; 8:00 p.m., SECN		at Kentucky						Rupp Arena; Lexington, KY
February 13, 2027; 6:00 p.m., SECN		Auburn						Colonial Life Arena; Columbia, SC
February 20, 2027; 3:30 p.m., SECN		Ole Miss						Colonial Life Arena; Columbia, SC
February 23, 2027; 7:00 p.m., SECN		at Tennessee						Thompson–Boling Arena; Knoxville, TN
February 27, 2027; 1:00 p.m., SECN		Mississippi State						Colonial Life Arena; Columbia, SC
March 2, 2027; 8:00 p.m., SECN		Florida						Colonial Life Arena; Columbia, SC
March 6, 2027; 12:00 p.m., SECN		at Georgia						Stegeman Coliseum; Athens, GA
SEC tournament
March 10–14, 2027; TBA		vs. TBD						Bridgestone Arena; Nashville, TN
*Non-conference game. ^{#}Rankings from AP poll. (#) Tournament seedings in parentheses. All times are in Eastern Time.
