= 2026–27 Mississippi State Bulldogs men's basketball team =

American college basketball season

2026–27 Mississippi State Bulldogs men's basketball
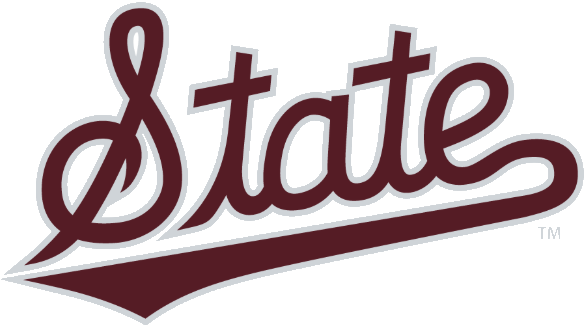
- Conference: Southeastern Conference
- Record: 3–1 (0–0 SEC)
- Head coach: Chris Jans (5th season)
- Assistant coaches: George Brooks; David Anwar; Corey Barker; Shunn Buchanan; Alex Barlow Dillon Elder
- Home arena: Humphrey Coliseum

2026–27 Southeastern Conference men's basketball standings
	Conf.				Overall
Team	W		L	PCT	W		L	PCT
Texas A&M	0	–	0	–	6	–	0	1.000
No. 16 Alabama	0	–	0	–	5	–	0	1.000
Georgia	0	–	0	–	5	–	0	1.000
No. 25 LSU	0	–	0	–	5	–	0	1.000
South Carolina	0	–	0	–	5	–	0	1.000
No. 6 Texas	0	–	0	–	5	–	0	1.000
No. 15 Vanderbilt	0	–	0	–	5	–	0	1.000
Ole Miss	0	–	0	–	4	–	0	1.000
No. 14 Tennessee	0	–	0	–	4	–	0	1.000
No. 1 Florida	0	–	0	–	6	–	1	.857
Kentucky	0	–	0	–	4	–	1	.800
Mississippi State	0	–	0	–	4	–	1	.800
Missouri	0	–	0	–	4	–	1	.800
Oklahoma	0	–	0	–	4	–	1	.800
No. 20 Arkansas	0	–	0	–	3	–	2	.600
Auburn	0	–	0	–	3	–	3	.500
† 2027 SEC tournament winner As of November 20, 2026; Rankings from AP poll

The 2026–27 Mississippi State Bulldogs men's basketball team represents Mississippi State University during the 2026–27 NCAA Division I men's basketball season. The Bulldogs, led by fifth-year head coach Chris Jans, play their home games at Humphrey Coliseum near Starkville, Mississippi, as a member of the Southeastern Conference.

== Previous season ==
The Bulldogs finished the 2025–26 season 13–19, 5–13 in SEC play. They lost to Auburn 79–61 in the first round of the SEC tournament.

== Offseason ==
=== Coaching changes ===
Jans added three assistant coaches for the 2026–27 season. Corey Barker had previously worked under Jans at Bowling Green and New Mexico State, and Shunn Buchanan returned to the program after serving as a graduate assistant during Jans's first two seasons at Mississippi State. Alex Barlow, a former Butler player, joined after three seasons as an assistant coach at his alma mater. Before that he had worked in the Boston Celtics organization, including a season as head coach of the Maine Celtics in 2022–23. On August 26, 2026, the program completed its staff by hiring Dylan Sortillo as director of operations and adding six graduate assistant fellows.

=== Roster turnover ===
On April 17, 2026, Josh Hubbard announced that he would return for his senior season. He had scored 707 points in 2025–26 and entered his final season with 1,947 career points, fourth in program history. Ten players from the 2025–26 team did not return, leaving five returning players. Jamarion Davis-Fleming transferred to Alabama and Amier Ali to California.

Mississippi State brought in eight transfers. They included Tajuan Simpkins, who averaged 9.7 points per game at Seton Hall, and forwards ND Okafor from Washington State and Thomas Bassong from Florida State. Kimani Hamilton returned to Mississippi State, where he had begun his career in 2022–23, after two seasons at High Point and one at UNLV.

=== Departures ===
Mississippi State departures
Name	Number	Pos.	Height	Weight	Year	Hometown	Reason for Departure
Jamarion Davis-Fleming	0	F	6'10"	240	Freshman	Canton, Mississippi	Transferred to Alabama
Dellquan Warren	1	G	6'2"	185	Sophomore	Erie, Pennsylvania	Transferred to McNeese
Ja'Borri McGhee	2	G	6'2"	210	Senior	McComb, Mississippi	Graduated
Brandon Walker	4	F	6'8"	260	Senior	Oak Cliff, Texas	Graduated
Shawn Jones Jr.	5	G	6'6"	205	Senior	Houston, Texas	Graduated
Jayden Epps	10	G	6'2"	190	Senior	Norfolk, Virginia	Graduated
Sergej Macura	11	F	6'9"	220	Sophomore	Ljubljana, Slovenia	Left the program
Amier Ali	14	G/F	6'8"	210	Sophomore	Dallas, Texas	Transferred to California
Quincy Ballard	15	C	7'0"	260	RS Senior	Syracuse, New York	Graduated
Achor Achor	99	F	6'9"	230	RS Senior	Melbourne, Australia	Graduated

=== Incoming transfers ===
Mississippi State incoming transfers
Name	Number	Pos.	Height	Weight	Year	Hometown	Previous School
Tajuan Simpkins	2	G	6'4"	195	Senior	Brooklyn, New York	Seton Hall
Kimani Hamilton	5	F	6'8"	225	Graduate Student	Jackson, Mississippi	UNLV
Trevor Reed	9	F	6'8"	230	Senior	St. Louis, Missouri	Denison
RJ Johnson	11	G	6'4"	225	Senior	Huntsville, Alabama	Kennesaw State
Kendyl Sanders	13	F	6'8"	230	Sophomore	Los Angeles, California	Utah
Thomas Bassong	21	F	6'8"	230	Sophomore	Paris, France	Florida State
ND Okafor	22	C	6'10"	265	Graduate Student	Dundalk, Ireland	Washington State
Ashton Magee	24	G	6'7"	210	Sophomore	Laurel, Mississippi	Southern

=== 2026 recruiting class ===
Mississippi State 2026 recruiting class
Name	Number	Pos.	Height	Weight	Hometown	High school
Jalyn Collingwood	0	G	6'7"	215	Riverdale, Maryland	Sidwell Friends
Tristan Reed	33	C	6'10"	250	St. Louis, Missouri	Link Academy
Willie Burnett III	99	G	6'5"	190	Melbourne, Florida	Gillion Academy

== Preseason ==
On October 12, 2026, the SEC released its preseason media poll. Mississippi State was picked to finish 15th in the conference, and Hubbard was named to the preseason All-SEC first team. The league's coaches also named Hubbard to their preseason first team, making him a consensus selection. He was also named to the preseason watch list for the Bob Cousy Award.

=== Preseason rankings ===
SEC Preseason Media Poll
Place	Team
1	Florida
2	Texas
3	Arkansas
4	Tennessee
5	Alabama
6	Vanderbilt
7	Kentucky
8	Missouri
9	Texas A&M
10	Auburn
11	Georgia
12	Oklahoma
13	Ole Miss
14	LSU
15	Mississippi State
16	South Carolina

== Roster ==
2026–27 Mississippi State Bulldogs men's basketball team
Players
Coaches

Pos.	#	Name	Height	Weight	Year	Previous school	Hometown
G	0	Jalyn Collingwood	6 ft 7 in (2.01 m)	215 lb (98 kg)	Fr	Sidwell Friends	Riverdale, MD
G	1	King Grace	6 ft 5 in (1.96 m)	205 lb (93 kg)	So	Oak Cliff Faith Family Academy	Dallas, TX
G	2	Tajuan Simpkins	6 ft 4 in (1.93 m)	195 lb (88 kg)	Sr	Liberty Heights Christian; Seton Hall	Brooklyn, NY
C	3	Tee Bartlett	6 ft 11 in (2.11 m)	270 lb (122 kg)	So	Overtime Elite	Los Angeles, CA
F	5	Kimani Hamilton	6 ft 8 in (2.03 m)	225 lb (102 kg)	GS	Clinton HS; UNLV	Jackson, MS
G	8	Cameren Paul	6 ft 7 in (2.01 m)	210 lb (95 kg)	So	South Grand Prairie HS	Grand Prairie, TX
F	9	Trevor Reed	6 ft 8 in (2.03 m)	230 lb (104 kg)	Sr	John Burroughs; Denison	St. Louis, MO
G	11	RJ Johnson	6 ft 4 in (1.93 m)	225 lb (102 kg)	Sr	Grissom HS; Kennesaw State	Huntsville, AL
G	12	Josh Hubbard	6 ft 0 in (1.83 m)	190 lb (86 kg)	Sr	Madison-Ridgeland Academy	Madison, MS
F	13	Kendyl Sanders	6 ft 8 in (2.03 m)	230 lb (104 kg)	So	IMG Academy; Utah	Los Angeles, CA
F	21	Thomas Bassong	6 ft 8 in (2.03 m)	230 lb (104 kg)	So	Overtime Elite; Florida State	Paris, France
C	22	ND Okafor	6 ft 10 in (2.08 m)	265 lb (120 kg)	GS	NBA Academy Latin America; Washington State	Dundalk, Ireland
G	24	Ashton Magee	6 ft 7 in (2.01 m)	210 lb (95 kg)	So	South Jones HS; Southern	Laurel, MS
C	33	Tristan Reed	6 ft 10 in (2.08 m)	250 lb (113 kg)	Fr	Link Academy	St. Louis, MO
C	34	Gai Chol	7 ft 0 in (2.13 m)	245 lb (111 kg)	Sr	Greenforest McCalep Christian Academy	Juba, South Sudan
G	99	Willie Burnett III	6 ft 5 in (1.96 m)	190 lb (86 kg)	Fr	Gillion Academy	Melbourne, FL

Head coach

- Chris Jans (Loras)

Assistant coach(es)

- George Brooks (Mississippi State)
- David Anwar (Fitchburg State)
- Corey Barker (Prairie View A&M)
- Shunn Buchanan (New Mexico State)
- Alex Barlow (Butler)
- Dillon Elder (Texas A&M)

Legend

- (C) Team captain
- (S) Suspended
- (I) Ineligible
- (W) Walk-on
- Injured
- Current redshirt

Roster
Last update: November 13, 2026

== Schedule and results ==
Date time, TV	Rank^{#}	Opponent^{#}	Result	Record	High points	High rebounds	High assists	Site (attendance) city, state
Exhibition
October 18, 2026*; 3:00 p.m.		vs. NC State	L 73–77	–	–	–	–	Greensboro, NC
October 23, 2026*; 7:00 p.m.		Memphis	L 58–75	–	–	–	–	Humphrey Coliseum; Starkville, MS
Non-conference regular season
November 2, 2026*; 6:30 p.m., SECN+		Tennessee Tech	W 106–88	1–0	25 – Hubbard	8 – Grace	9 – Hubbard	Humphrey Coliseum (6,003); Starkville, MS
November 5, 2026*; 6:30 p.m., SECN+		Northwestern State	W 82–44	2–0	15 – Hubbard	8 – Bassong	3 – Tied	Humphrey Coliseum (6,126); Starkville, MS
November 9, 2026*; 6:30 p.m., SECN+		Jackson State	W 98–57	3–0	14 – Tied	8 – Tied	3 – Tied	Humphrey Coliseum (6,131); Starkville, MS
November 13, 2026*; 8:00 p.m., FS1		vs. Xavier; Greenbrier Tip-Off	L 63–81	3–1	12 – Hubbard	7 – Reed	3 – Hubbard	Colonial Hall (1,020); White Sulphur Springs, WV
November 17, 2026*; 6:00 p.m., ESPN+		at UCF	W 86–83	4–1	19 – Grace	11 – Reed	5 – Johnson	Addition Financial Arena (5,504); Orlando, FL
November 20, 2026*; 6:30 p.m.		vs. Tulsa; Magnolia Madness						Mississippi Coliseum; Jackson, MS
November 25, 2026*; 6:30 p.m., ESPN2		vs. Wake Forest; Battle 4 Atlantis						Imperial Arena; Paradise Island, Bahamas
November 27, 2026*; 12:30 or 6:30 p.m., SECN		vs. TBD; Battle 4 Atlantis						Imperial Arena; Paradise Island, Bahamas
December 2, 2026*; 8:15 p.m., SECN		Georgia Tech; SEC/ACC Challenge						Humphrey Coliseum; Starkville, MS
December 7, 2026*; 6:00 p.m., SECN		Alabama A&M						Humphrey Coliseum; Starkville, MS
December 12, 2026*; 5:30 p.m., FS1		at Marquette						Fiserv Forum; Milwaukee, WI
December 15, 2026*; 6:30 p.m., SECN+		Mississippi Valley State						Humphrey Coliseum; Starkville, MS
December 19, 2026*; 2:00 p.m.		vs. VCU; Rocket City Classic						Von Braun Center; Huntsville, AL
December 28, 2026*; 6:30 p.m., SECN+		Campbell						Humphrey Coliseum; Starkville, MS
SEC regular season
January 2, 2027; 5:00 p.m., SECN		Alabama						Humphrey Coliseum; Starkville, MS
January 6, 2027; 6:00 p.m., SECN		at Vanderbilt						Memorial Gymnasium; Nashville, TN
January 9, 2027; 5:00 p.m., SECN		at Oklahoma						Lloyd Noble Center; Norman, OK
January 13, 2027; 8:00 p.m., ESPN2 or ESPNU		Florida						Humphrey Coliseum; Starkville, MS
January 16, 2027; 2:30 p.m., SECN		at Georgia						Stegeman Coliseum; Athens, GA
January 20, 2027; 7:30 p.m., SECN		Kentucky						Humphrey Coliseum; Starkville, MS
January 23, 2027; 12:00 p.m., SECN		South Carolina						Humphrey Coliseum; Starkville, MS
January 26, 2027; 6:00 p.m., SECN		at Auburn						Neville Arena; Auburn, AL
January 30, 2027; 7:30 p.m., SECN		at Arkansas						Bud Walton Arena; Fayetteville, AR
February 3, 2027; 7:00 p.m., SECN		Missouri						Humphrey Coliseum; Starkville, MS
February 6, 2027; 5:00 p.m., SECN		Texas A&M						Humphrey Coliseum; Starkville, MS
February 13, 2027; 7:30 p.m., SECN		at Ole Miss						SJB Pavilion; Oxford, MS
February 16, 2027; 8:00 p.m., SECN		at Alabama						Coleman Coliseum; Tuscaloosa, AL
February 20, 2027; 5:00 p.m., SECN		LSU						Humphrey Coliseum; Starkville, MS
February 24, 2027; 6:00 p.m., ESPN2 or ESPNU		Texas						Humphrey Coliseum; Starkville, MS
February 27, 2027; 12:00 p.m., SECN		at South Carolina						Colonial Life Arena; Columbia, SC
March 2, 2027; 5:00 p.m., SECN		at Tennessee						Thompson–Boling Arena; Knoxville, TN
March 6, 2027; 3:00 p.m., SECN		Ole Miss						Humphrey Coliseum; Starkville, MS
SEC tournament
March 10, 2027; TBA		vs. TBD						Bridgestone Arena; Nashville, TN
*Non-conference game. ^{#}Rankings from AP poll. (#) Tournament seedings in parentheses. All times are in Central Time.
