= David Punch (basketball) =

American basketball player (born 2006)

No. 13 – Texas Longhorns
- Position: Power forward
- Conference: Southeastern Conference

Personal information
- Born: August 2, 2006 (age 20)
- Listed height: 6 ft 7 in (2.01 m)
- Listed weight: 245 lb (111 kg)

Career information
- High school: Harker Heights (Harker Heights, Texas)
- College: TCU (2024–2026); Texas (2026–present)

David Punch (born August 2, 2006) is an American college basketball player for the Texas Longhorns of the Southeastern Conference. He previously played for the TCU Horned Frogs.

== Early life ==
Punch attended Harker Heights High School in Harker Heights, Texas. Coming out of high school, he committed to play college basketball for the TCU Horned Frogs over offers from NC State and Penn State.

== College career ==
=== TCU ===
On February 2, 2025, Punch scored 19 points in a win over Colorado. As a freshman during the 2024–25 season, Punch played in 32 games with 27 starts, averaging 6.5 points, 4.4 rebounds, and 0.9 blocks per game. On December 18, 2025, he recorded 17 points, six rebounds, and three blocks in a win against Oral Roberts. In the first round of the 2026 NCAA Division I men's basketball tournament, Punch notched 16 points, 13 rebounds, and three blocks in a win over Ohio State. He finished the 2025–26 season averaging 14.1 points, 6.8 rebounds, two assists, 1.9 blocks, and 1.3 steals per game, earning all-Big 12 honorable mention. After the conclusion of the season, Punch entered the NCAA transfer portal.

=== Texas ===
Punch transferred to play for the Texas Longhorns.
