= 2026–27 Kentucky Wildcats men's basketball team =

American college basketball season

2026–27 Kentucky Wildcats men's basketball
- Conference: Southeastern Conference
- Record: 4–2 (0–0 SEC)
- Head coach: Mark Pope (3rd season)
- Associate head coach: Mark Fox (3rd season)
- Assistant coaches: Cody Fueger (3rd season); Mikhail McLean (2nd season); Mo Williams (1st season)
- Home arena: Rupp Arena

2026–27 Southeastern Conference men's basketball standings
	Conf.				Overall
Team	W		L	PCT	W		L	PCT
Texas A&M	0	–	0	–	6	–	0	1.000
No. 16 Alabama	0	–	0	–	5	–	0	1.000
Georgia	0	–	0	–	5	–	0	1.000
No. 25 LSU	0	–	0	–	5	–	0	1.000
South Carolina	0	–	0	–	5	–	0	1.000
No. 6 Texas	0	–	0	–	5	–	0	1.000
No. 15 Vanderbilt	0	–	0	–	5	–	0	1.000
Ole Miss	0	–	0	–	4	–	0	1.000
No. 14 Tennessee	0	–	0	–	4	–	0	1.000
No. 1 Florida	0	–	0	–	6	–	1	.857
Kentucky	0	–	0	–	4	–	1	.800
Mississippi State	0	–	0	–	4	–	1	.800
Missouri	0	–	0	–	4	–	1	.800
Oklahoma	0	–	0	–	4	–	1	.800
No. 20 Arkansas	0	–	0	–	3	–	2	.600
Auburn	0	–	0	–	3	–	3	.500
† 2027 SEC tournament winner As of November 21, 2026; Rankings from AP poll

The 2026–27 Kentucky Wildcats men's basketball team will represent the University of Kentucky during the 2026–27 NCAA Division I men's basketball season. The Wildcats, founding members of the Southeastern Conference, play their home games at Rupp Arena and are led by Mark Pope in his third season as head coach for the Wildcats.

== Previous season ==
The Wildcats finished the 2025–26 season with a record of 22–14, 10–8 in SEC play to finish in a 3-way tie for seventh place in the SEC. The Wildcats earned a number nine seed in the SEC tournament, they won their first-round and second-round games against LSU and Missouri then lost to Florida in the quarterfinals. They received an at-large bid to the NCAA tournament where the Wildcats made it to the second round by defeating Santa Clara, 89–84, in overtime. The Wildcats lost to Iowa State, 82–63, in the second round, finishing the season with an overall record of 22–14.

== Offseason ==
=== Staff changes ===
Following the conclusion of the 2025–26 season, head coach Mark Pope reorganized the Kentucky coaching staff after consecutive departures. In April 2026, associate head coach Alvin Brooks III left the program to accept an assistant coaching position at NC State, while assistant coach Jason Hart departed to join the staff at SMU.

To fill one of the vacant assistant roles, Pope hired Mo Williams, a 13-year NBA veteran, 2009 All-Star, and former head coach at Jackson State. Coinciding with the hire, Williams's son, four-star point guard Mason Williams, committed to play for Kentucky for the 2026–27 season after previously committing to his father at Jackson State.

=== Departures ===
Kentucky had 3 departures from the 2026 team that were lost to exhausted eligibility. On March 28, Jaland Lowe announced his entry into the NCAA transfer portal. On April 3, Brandon Garrison and Jasper Johnson put their names in the transfer portal. On April 6, Mouhamed Dioubate entered the transfer portal after one season at Kentucky. On April 7, Denzel Aberdeen and Andrija Jelavic entered the transfer portal On April 8, Collin Chandler entered the transfer portal. On April 10, Aberdeen committed to play for Florida, where Aberdeen previously played for three seasons prior to transferring to Kentucky for the 2025–26 season. On April 10, Jelavic committed to play for Ohio State for the 2026–27 season. On April 11, Chandler committed to BYU, where Chandler signed to play out of high school. On April 12, Garrison committed to play for Alabama for the 2026–27 season. On April 13, Lowe committed to play for Georgetown for the 2026–27 season. On April 14, Jayden Quaintance declared for the 2026 NBA Draft. On April 18, Johnson committed to play for Oregon for the 2026–27 season. On April 20, Dioubate committed to play for LSU for the 2026–27 season.

Name	Number	Pos.	Height	Weight	Year	Hometown	Reason for departure
Denzel Aberdeen	1	G	6'5"	180	Senior	Orlando, FL	Transferred to Florida
Mouhamed Dioubate	23	F	6'7"	215	Junior	Flushing, NY	Transferred to LSU
Brandon Garrison	10	C	6'11"	245	Junior	Oklahoma City, OK	Transferred to Alabama
Andrija Jelavić	4	F	6'11"	225	Freshman	Zagreb, Croatia	Transferred to Ohio State
Jasper Johnson	2	G	6'5"	180	Freshman	Lexington, KY	Transferred to Oregon
Jaland Lowe	15	G	6'1"	180	Junior	Missouri City, TX	Transferred to Georgetown
Otega Oweh	00	G	6'5"	210	Senior	Somerset, NJ	Graduated
Jayden Quaintance	21	F	6'10"	225	Sophomore	Cleveland, OH	2026 NBA Draft

=== Incoming transfers ===
Kentucky received its first transfer commitment for the 2026–27 season from guard Zoom Diallo, who transferred from Washington, on April 15. On April 18, guard Alex Wilkins, transferring from Furman, committed to play for Kentucky. On April 28, former James Madison forward Justin McBride became the third transfer commitment. The next day, on April 29, former local prep guard Jerone Morton transferred from Washington State to play for Kentucky for the 2026–27 season. On May 9, Washington center Franck Kepnang committed to play for Kentucky. On June 1, Kentucky added Iowa State forward Milan Momcilovic for the 2026–27 season.

Name	Num	Pos.	Height	Weight	Year	Hometown	Previous college
Zoom Diallo	5	G	6'6"	195	Junior	Tacoma, WA	Transferred from Washington
Franck Kepnang	11	C	7'0"	275	Senior	Yaoundé, Cameroon	Transferred from Washington
Justin McBride	21	F	6'8"	250	Senior	Plano, TX	Transferred from James Madison
Milan Momcilovic	22	F	6'9"	220	Senior	Pewaukee, WI	Transferred from Iowa State
Jerone Morton	1	G	6'4"	190	Senior	Lexington, KY	Transferred from Washington State
Alex Wilkins	10	G	6'6"	170	Sophomore	Boston, MA	Transferred from Furman

=== Class of 2026 signees ===
College recruiting
Name	Hometown	School	Height	Weight	Commit date
Mason Williams #20 PG	Dallas, TX	Tennessee Collegiate Academy	6 ft 3 in (1.91 m)	210 lb (95 kg)	Mar 27, 2026
Mason Williams #20 PG	Recruit ratings: Rivals: 247Sports: ESPN: (89)				
Zyon Hawthorne #67 PG	Beckley, WV	Huntington Prep	6 ft 1 in (1.85 m)	165 lb (75 kg)	Apr 24, 2026
Zyon Hawthorne #67 PG	Recruit ratings: Rivals: 247Sports: ESPN:				
Ousmane N'Diaye; F	Dakar, Senegal	Vanoli Basket Cremona	7 ft 0 in (2.13 m)	210 lb (95 kg)	Apr 24, 2026
Ousmane N'Diaye; F	Recruit ratings: No ratings found				
Overall recruit ranking:
Note: In many cases, Scout, Rivals, 247Sports, On3, and ESPN may conflict in their listings of height and weight.; In these cases, the average was taken. ESPN grades are on a 100-point scale.; Sources: "Kentucky 2025 Basketball Commitments". Rivals.; "2025 Kentucky Basketball Commits". ESPN.; "2025 Team Ranking". Rivals.; "Kentucky 2025 Basketball Commits". 247Sports.

== Roster ==
2026–27 Kentucky Wildcats men's basketball team
Players
Coaches

Pos.	#	Name	Height	Weight	Year	Previous school	Hometown
G	0	Zyon Hawthorne	6 ft 2 in (1.88 m)	165 lb (75 kg)	Fr	Huntington Prep	Beckley, WV
G	1	Jerone Morton	6 ft 4 in (1.93 m)	190 lb (86 kg)	Sr	Washington State	Lexington, KY
F	2	Braydon Hawthorne	6 ft 8 in (2.03 m)	195 lb (88 kg)	So	Huntington Prep	Beckley, WV
F	3	Kam Williams	6 ft 8 in (2.03 m)	210 lb (95 kg)	Jr	Tulane	Lafayette, LA
G	4	Mason Williams	6 ft 2 in (1.88 m)	210 lb (95 kg)	Fr	Tenn. Collegiate	Dallas, TX
G	5	Zoom Diallo	6 ft 6 in (1.98 m)	195 lb (88 kg)	Jr	Washington	Tacoma, WA
G	9	Trent Noah	6 ft 5 in (1.96 m)	225 lb (102 kg)	Jr	Harlan County	Harlan, KY
G	10	Alex Wilkins	6 ft 6 in (1.98 m)	170 lb (77 kg)	So	Furman	Boston, MA
C	11	Franck Kepnang	7 ft 0 in (2.13 m)	275 lb (125 kg)	GS	Washington	Yaoundé, CAM
F	19	Ousmane N'Diaye	7 ft 0 in (2.13 m)	210 lb (95 kg)	Jr	Vanoli Cremona	Dakar, SEN
F	21	Justin McBride	6 ft 8 in (2.03 m)	250 lb (113 kg)	Sr	James Madison	Plano, TX
F	22	Milan Momcilovic	6 ft 9 in (2.06 m)	220 lb (100 kg)	Sr	Iowa State	Pewaukee, WI
C	24	Malachi Moreno	7 ft 0 in (2.13 m)	245 lb (111 kg)	So	Great Crossing	Georgetown, KY
C	33	Reece Potter	7 ft 1 in (2.16 m)	235 lb (107 kg)	Sr	Miami (OH)	Lexington, KY

Head coach

- Mark Pope

Assistant coach(es)

- Mark Fox
- Cody Fueger
- Mikhail McLean
- Mo Williams

Legend

- (C) Team captain
- (S) Suspended
- (I) Ineligible
- (W) Walk-on
- Injured
- Current redshirt

Roster

== Schedule and results ==
Date time, TV	Rank^{#}	Opponent^{#}	Result	Record	High points	High rebounds	High assists	Site (attendance) city, state
Exhibition
October 16, 2026*; 7:00 p.m., SECN+		Little Rock	W 69–49		16 – Momcilovic	11 – Moreno	5 – Diallo	Rupp Arena (18,955); Lexington, KY
October 23, 2026*; 7:00 p.m., SECN+	No. 23	No. 19 Texas Tech	W 76–65		15 – Tied	7 – Ndiaye	7 – Wilkins	Rupp Arena (19,228); Lexington, KY
October 28, 2026*; 6:00 p.m., SECN	No. 23	UCF	W 90–76 ^{OT}		19 – Momcilovic	14 – Moreno	8 – Moreno	Rupp Arena (18,958); Lexington, KY
Non-conference regular season
November 3, 2026*; 7:00 p.m., SECN+	No. 23	Manhattan	W 85–57	1–0	24 – Momcilovic	10 – Moreno	5 – Tied	Rupp Arena (19,304); Lexington, KY
November 6, 2026*; 7:00 p.m., SECN	No. 23	James Madison	W 89–80	2–0	16 – Tied	8 – McBride	5 – Williams, M.	Rupp Arena (19,292); Lexington, KY
November 10, 2026*; 9:30 p.m., ESPN	No. 24	vs. No. 15 Kansas; Champions Classic	L 69–89	2–1	24 – Diallo	10 – Moreno	5 – Moreno	United Center (18,891); Chicago, IL
November 13, 2026*; 7:00 p.m., SECN+	No. 24	Northern Arizona	W 78–77	3–1	14 – Tied	6 – Moreno	6 – Moreno	Rupp Arena (19,459); Lexington, KY
November 16, 2026*; 7:00 p.m., SECN+		Grambling State	W 88–59	4–1	22 – Moreno	12 – Moreno	9 – Diallo	Rupp Arena (19,155); Lexington, KY
November 20, 2026*; 8:00 p.m., CBS		vs. Indiana; Rivalry	L 76–90	4–2	28 – Momcilovic	7 – Moreno	4 – Tied	Lucas Oil Stadium (23,078); Indianapolis, IN
November 27, 2026*; 9:00 p.m., ESPN2		Wichita State						Rupp Arena; Lexington, KY
December 2, 2026*; 7:15 p.m., ESPN		at Virginia; ACC–SEC Challenge						John Paul Jones Arena; Charlottesville, VA
December 5, 2026*; 1:00 p.m., SECN+		Appalachian State						Rupp Arena; Lexington, KY
December 8, 2026*; 7:30 p.m., ESPN2		Bryant						Rupp Arena; Lexington, KY
December 12, 2026*; 4:00 p.m., ABC		Louisville; Rivalry						Rupp Arena; Lexington, KY
December 19, 2026*; 2:30 p.m., CBS		vs. North Carolina; CBS Sports Classic						Madison Square Garden; New York City, NY
December 22, 2026*; 1:00 p.m., SECN		Sacred Heart						Rupp Arena; Lexington, KY
December 28, 2026*; 7:00 p.m., SECN		Gardner–Webb						Rupp Arena; Lexington, KY
SEC regular season
January 2, 2027; 12:00 p.m., ESPN/ESPN2		at Oklahoma						Lloyd Noble Center; Norman, OK
January 5, 2027; 7:00 p.m., ESPN/ESPN2		Ole Miss						Rupp Arena; Lexington, KY
January 9, 2027; 4:00 p.m., ESPN2		at Missouri						Mizzou Arena; Columbia, MO
January 13, 2027; 7:00 p.m., SECN		LSU						Rupp Arena; Lexington, KY
January 16, 2027; 4:00 p.m., ESPN/ESPN2		Vanderbilt						Rupp Arena; Lexington, KY
January 20, 2027; 8:30 p.m., SECN		at Mississippi State						Humphrey Coliseum; Mississippi State, MS
January 23, 2027; 2:00 p.m., ESPN/ESPN2/ESPNU		Tennessee						Rupp Arena; Lexington, KY
January 30, 2027; 12:00 p.m., ESPN/ESPN2		at Texas						Moody Center; Austin, TX
February 2, 2027; 9:00 p.m., ESPN/ESPN2		at Ole Miss						SJB Pavilion; Oxford, MS
February 6, 2027; 2:00 p.m., ESPN/ESPN2		Alabama						Rupp Arena; Lexington, KY
February 10, 2027; 8:00 p.m., SECN		South Carolina						Rupp Arena; Lexington, KY
February 13, 2027; 4:00 p.m., ESPN		at Tennessee						Thompson-Boling Arena; Knoxville, TN
February 16, 2027; 7:00 p.m., ESPN/ESPN2		at Georgia						Stegeman Coliseum; Athens, GA
February 20, 2027; 6:00/6:30 p.m., ESPN		Arkansas						Rupp Arena; Lexington, KY
February 23, 2027; 9:00 p.m., ESPN/ESPN2		at Vanderbilt						Memorial Gymnasium; Nashville, TN
February 27, 2027; 4:00/4:30 p.m., ESPN/ESPN2		Auburn						Rupp Arena; Lexington, KY
March 3, 2027; 7:00 p.m., ESPN2/ESPNU		Texas A&M						Rupp Arena; Lexington, KY
March 6, 2027; 4:00/4:30 p.m., ESPN		at Florida						Exactech Arena; Gainesville, FL
SEC Tournament
March 10–14, 2027; SECN/ESPN		vs.						Bridgestone Arena; Nashville, TN
*Non-conference game. ^{#}Rankings from AP Poll. (#) Tournament seedings in parentheses. All times are in Eastern Time.

== Rankings ==
Ranking movements Legend: ██ Increase in ranking ██ Decrease in ranking RV = Received votes
	Week																				
Poll	Pre	1	2	3	4	5	6	7	8	9	10	11	12	13	14	15	16	17	18	19	Final
AP	23	24	RV																		
Coaches	23	RV	RV																		
