= 2026–27 Florida Gators men's basketball team =

American college basketball season

2026–27 Florida Gators men's basketball
- Conference: Southeastern Conference

Ranking
- Coaches: No. 1
- AP: No. 1
- Record: 6–1 (0–0 SEC)
- Head coach: Todd Golden (5th season)
- Assistant coaches: Carlin Hartman (5th season); Korey McCray (5th season); Taurean Green (4th season); Jonathan Safir (2nd season); David Klatsky (2nd season)
- Home arena: O'Connell Center

2026–27 Southeastern Conference men's basketball standings
	Conf.				Overall
Team	W		L	PCT	W		L	PCT
No. 16 Alabama	0	–	0	–	5	–	0	1.000
Georgia	0	–	0	–	5	–	0	1.000
No. 25 LSU	0	–	0	–	5	–	0	1.000
South Carolina	0	–	0	–	5	–	0	1.000
Texas A&M	0	–	0	–	5	–	0	1.000
No. 15 Vanderbilt	0	–	0	–	5	–	0	1.000
Ole Miss	0	–	0	–	4	–	0	1.000
No. 14 Tennessee	0	–	0	–	4	–	0	1.000
No. 6 Texas	0	–	0	–	4	–	0	1.000
No. 1 Florida	0	–	0	–	5	–	1	.833
Kentucky	0	–	0	–	4	–	1	.800
Mississippi State	0	–	0	–	4	–	1	.800
Missouri	0	–	0	–	4	–	1	.800
Oklahoma	0	–	0	–	4	–	1	.800
No. 20 Arkansas	0	–	0	–	3	–	2	.600
Auburn	0	–	0	–	3	–	2	.600
† 2027 SEC tournament winner As of November 19, 2026; Rankings from AP poll

The 2026–27 Florida Gators men's basketball team will represent the University of Florida during the 2026–27 NCAA Division I men's basketball season. The Gators will be led by fifth-year head coach Todd Golden. Florida plays their home games at the O'Connell Center in Gainesville, Florida as a member of the Southeastern Conference (SEC).

== Previous season ==
The Gators finished the 2025–26 season with a record of 27–8 and 16–2 in SEC play to finish as regular season champions. In the SEC tournament, they defeated Kentucky in the quarterfinals before losing to Vanderbilt in the semifinals. The Gators received an at-large bid to the 2026 NCAA Division I men's basketball tournament as the No. 1 seed in the South region. They defeated Prairie View A&M, 114–55, in the first round before losing to Iowa, 73–72, in the second round.

== Offseason ==
=== Departures ===
Benchmark International Arena during a Florida Gators basketball game against the Miami Hurricanes in November 2026

Florida departures
Name	Number	Pos.	Height	Weight	Year	Hometown	Reason for departure
Xaivian Lee	1	G	6'4"	180	Senior	Toronto, ON	Transferred to Gonzaga
Micah Handlogten	3	C	7'1"	265	Senior	Lake Norman, NC	Transferred to Ole Miss
Olivier Rioux	32	C	7'9"	305	RS Freshman	Terrebonne, QC	Transferred to UC Irvine
Cooper Josefsberg	33	G	6'4"	195	Junior	Miami, FL	Walk-on; left team

=== Incoming transfers ===
On April 10, 2026, Denzel Aberdeen committed to transferring to Florida for the 2026–27 season, returning to the team he helped win the 2025 national championship. He was seeking a fifth season of eligibility. On September 29, he was granted a temporary injunction against the NCAA in a Florida circuit court, allowing him to play a fifth season of college basketball.

Florida incoming transfers
Name	Number	Pos.	Height	Weight	Year	Hometown	Previous school
Denzel Aberdeen	1	G	6'5"	190	5th	Orlando, FL	Kentucky

=== 2026 recruiting class ===
Florida received its first (and only) class of 2026 high school commitment from center Jones Lay on September 9, 2025. On April 27, 2026, Florida announced the signing of Lithuanian forward Artūras Butajevas of Spanish club Unicaja Málaga. One week later, on May 4, Florida added Slovenian forward Domen Petrović of KK Šenčur.

College recruiting
Name	Hometown	School	Height	Weight	Commit date
Jones Lay; C	Tabor City, NC	Moravian Prep	6 ft 11 in (2.11 m)	240 lb (110 kg)	Sep 9, 2025
Jones Lay; C	Recruit ratings: Rivals: ESPN: (78)				
Artūras Butajevas; F	Klaipėda, Lithuania	Unicaja Málaga (ESP)	6 ft 10 in (2.08 m)	235 lb (107 kg)	Apr 27, 2026
Artūras Butajevas; F	Recruit ratings: No ratings found				
Domen Petrović; F	Ajdovscina, Slovenia	KK Šenčur (SLO)	6 ft 9 in (2.06 m)	230 lb (100 kg)	May 4, 2026
Domen Petrović; F	Recruit ratings: No ratings found				
Overall recruit ranking:
Note: In many cases, Scout, Rivals, 247Sports, On3, and ESPN may conflict in their listings of height and weight.; In these cases, the average was taken. ESPN grades are on a 100-point scale.; Sources: "2026 Team Ranking". Rivals.

== Roster ==
2026–27 Florida Gators men's basketball team
Players
Coaches

Pos.	#	Name	Height	Weight	Year	Previous school	Hometown
G	0	Boogie Fland	6 ft 3 in (1.91 m)	190 lb (86 kg)	Jr	Archbishop Stepinac HS; Arkansas	Bronx, NY
G	1	Denzel Aberdeen	6 ft 5 in (1.96 m)	190 lb (86 kg)	GS	Dr. Phillips; Kentucky	Orlando, FL
G	23	AJ Brown	6 ft 4 in (1.93 m)	210 lb (95 kg)	RS Jr	Orlando Christian Prep; Ohio	Orlando, FL
G	4	Alex Lloyd	6 ft 3 in (1.91 m)	185 lb (84 kg)	So	Westminster Academy	Fort Lauderdale, FL
G	7	Urban Klavžar	6 ft 1 in (1.85 m)	185 lb (84 kg)		Real Madrid	Domžale, Slovenia
G	8	Alex Kovatchev	6 ft 5 in (1.96 m)	195 lb (88 kg)	RS Jr	Woodvale Secondary; Sacramento State	Perth, Australia
C	9	Rueben Chinyelu	6 ft 10 in (2.08 m)	265 lb (120 kg)	Sr	Stade Malien; Washington State	Enugwu-Agidi, Nigeria
F	10	Thomas Haugh	6 ft 9 in (2.06 m)	215 lb (98 kg)	Sr	Perkiomen School	New Oxford, PA
G	11	CJ Ingram	6 ft 6 in (1.98 m)	205 lb (93 kg)	So	Montverde Academy	Hawthorne, FL
C	12	Viktor Mikić	6 ft 11 in (2.11 m)	260 lb (118 kg)	Jr	Hamilton Heights (TN)	Belgrade, Serbia
C	13	Jones Lay	6 ft 11 in (2.11 m)	240 lb (109 kg)	Fr	Moravian Prep	Tabor City, NC
F	19	Domen Petrović	6 ft 9 in (2.06 m)	230 lb (104 kg)	Jr	KK Šenčur	Ajdovščina, Slovenia
G	20	Isaiah Brown	6 ft 4 in (1.93 m)	210 lb (95 kg)	Jr	Orlando Christian Prep	Orlando, FL
F/C	21	Alex Condon	6 ft 11 in (2.11 m)	236 lb (107 kg)	Sr	NBA Global Academy	Perth, Australia
F	25	Artūras Butajevas	6 ft 10 in (2.08 m)	235 lb (107 kg)	RS Fr	Unicaja Málaga	Klaipėda, Lithuania

Head coach

- Todd Golden (Saint Mary's)

Assistant coach(es)

- Carlin Hartman (Tulane)
- Korey McCray (Mercer)
- Taurean Green (Florida)
- Jonathan Safir (Columbia)
- David Klatsky (Penn)

Legend

- (C) Team captain
- (S) Suspended
- (I) Ineligible
- (W) Walk-on
- Injured
- Current redshirt

Roster

== Schedule and results ==
Date time, TV	Rank^{#}	Opponent^{#}	Result	Record	High points	High rebounds	High assists	Site (attendance) city, state
Exhibition
October 18, 2026*; 2:00 p.m., SECN+		vs. Baylor; Jacksonville Hoops Showdown	L 76–82 ^{OT}		19 – Haugh	15 – Chinyelu	4 – Condon	VyStar Veterans Memorial Arena (5,541); Jacksonville, FL
October 27, 2026*; 7:00 p.m., SECN+	No. 1	Stetson	W 85–68		24 – Klavzar	9 – Condon	5 – Condon	O'Connell Center (5,310); Gainesville, FL
Non-conference regular season
November 2, 2026*; 6:00 p.m., ESPN2	No. 1	vs. No. 14 Miami (FL); Orion180 Tip-Off Classic	W 77–67	1–0	19 – Haugh	14 – Chinyelu	4 – Tied	Benchmark International Arena (15,324); Tampa, FL
November 5, 2026*; 8:00 p.m., SECN+	No. 1	Jacksonville	W 88–57	2–0	21 – Chinyelu	12 – Condon	8 – Condon	O'Connell Center (10,007); Gainesville, FL
November 10, 2026*; 6:00 p.m., ESPN2	No. 1	at Florida State; Rivalry	W 81–72	3–0	21 – Haugh	10 – Tied	4 – Fland	Donald L. Tucker Civic Center (11,500); Tallahassee, FL
November 13, 2026*; 7:00 p.m., SEC Network	No. 1	Merrimack	W 83–54	4–0	16 – Condon	6 – Tied	4 – Condon	O'Connell Center (10,264); Gainesville, FL
November 17, 2026*; 4:30 p.m., ESPN	No. 1	vs. Notre Dame; Players Era 8 First Round	W 86–78	5–0	24 – Klavzar	10 – Condon	5 – Condon	Michelob Ultra Arena (3,923); Las Vegas, NV
November 18, 2026*; 4:30 p.m., ESPN	No. 1	vs. No. 8 Houston; Players Era 8 Semifinals	L 76–86	5–1	26 – Aberdeen	7 – Chinyelu	4 – Tied	Michelob Ultra Arena (4,325); Las Vegas, NV
November 19, 2026*; 2:30 p.m., ESPN	No. 1	vs. West Virginia; Players Era 8 3rd Place Game	W 85–72	6–1	22 – Haugh	7 – Lay	5 – Aberdeen	Michelob Ultra Arena; Las Vegas, NV
November 24, 2026*; 7:00 p.m., SEC Network		Milwaukee						O'Connell Center; Gainesville, FL
December 1, 2026*; 9:30 p.m., ESPN		Duke; ACC-SEC Challenge						O'Connell Center; Gainesville, FL
December 6, 2026*; 12:00 p.m., SEC Network		Vermont						O'Connell Center; Gainesville, FL
December 12, 2026*; 12:00 p.m., ESPNU		vs. Georgia Tech; Hall of Fame Series - Orlando						Kia Center; Orlando, FL
December 18, 2026*; 6:00 p.m., ESPNU		vs. Grand Canyon; Jacksonville Hoops Showdown						VyStar Veterans Memorial Arena; Jacksonville, FL
December 21, 2026*; 7:00 p.m., SEC Network		Florida A&M						O'Connell Center; Gainesville, FL
December 21, 2026*; 6:00 p.m., SEC Network		LIU						O'Connell Center; Gainesville, FL
SEC regular season
January 2, 2027; 6:00 p.m., ESPN/ESPN2		at Texas						Moody Center; Austin, TX
January 6, 2027; 9:00 p.m., ESPN2		Oklahoma						O'Connell Center; Gainesville, FL
January 9, 2027; 11:00 a.m., ESPN		Vanderbilt						O'Connell Center; Gainesville, FL
January 13, 2027; 9:00 p.m., ESPN2/ESPNU		at Mississippi State						Humphrey Coliseum; Starkville, MS
January 16, 2027; 2:00 p.m., ESPN/ESPN2		at Alabama						Coleman Coliseum; Tuscaloosa, AL
January 20, 2027; 7:00 p.m., ESPN2/ESPNU		Texas A&M						O'Connell Center; Gainesville, FL
January 23, 2027; 4:00 p.m., ESPN/ESPN2/ESPNU		at Georgia						Stegeman Coliseum; Athens, GA
January 30, 2027; 8:00 p.m./8:30 p.m., ESPN/ESPN2		at Tennessee						Food City Center; Knoxville, TN
February 2, 2027; TBA, SEC Network		South Carolina						O'Connell Center; Gainesville, FL
February 6, 2027; 12:00 p.m., ESPN		Texas						O'Connell Center; Gainesville, FL
February 9, 2027; 7:00 p.m., ESPN2		at Auburn						Neville Arena; Auburn, AL
February 13, 2027; 12:00 p.m., ESPN/ESPN2		Missouri						O'Connell Center; Gainesville, FL
February 17, 2027; 8:00 p.m., SEC Network		at LSU						Pete Maravich Assembly Center; Baton Rouge, LA
February 20, 2027; 8:30 p.m., SEC Network		Georgia						O'Connell Center; Gainesville, FL
February 24, 2027; 9:00 p.m., ESPN/ESPN2		Ole Miss						O'Connell Center; Gainesville, FL
February 27, 2027; 3:00 p.m., ABC		at Arkansas						Bud Walton Arena; Fayetteville, AR
March 2, 2027; 8:00 p.m., SEC Network		at South Carolina						Colonial Life Arena; Columbia, SC
March 6, 2027; 4:00/4:30 p.m., ESPN		Kentucky						O'Connell Center; Gainesville, FL
SEC tournament
March 10-14, 2027; TBA		vs.						Bridgestone Arena; Nashville, TN
*Non-conference game. ^{#}Rankings from AP Poll. (#) Tournament seedings in parentheses. All times are in Eastern Time.

== Rankings ==
Ranking movements Legend: ( ) = First-place votes
	Week																				
Poll	Pre	1	2	3	4	5	6	7	8	9	10	11	12	13	14	15	16	17	18	19	Final
AP	1 (47)	1 (53)	1 (56)																		
Coaches	1 (20)	1 (22)	1 (29)																		
