= 2025–26 Kentucky Wildcats men's basketball team =

American college basketball season

2025–26 Kentucky Wildcats men's basketball

NCAA tournament, Second round
- Conference: Southeastern Conference
- Record: 22–14 (10–8 SEC)
- Head coach: Mark Pope (2nd season)
- Associate head coach: Alvin Brooks III (2nd season)
- Assistant coaches: Mark Fox (2nd season); Cody Fueger (2nd season); Jason Hart (2nd season); Mikhail McLean (2nd season)
- Home arena: Rupp Arena

2025–26 Southeastern Conference men's basketball standings
	Conf.				Overall
Team	W		L	PCT	W		L	PCT
No. 9 Florida	16	–	2	.889	27	–	8	.771
No. 16 Alabama	13	–	5	.722	25	–	10	.714
No. 13 Arkansas †	13	–	5	.722	28	–	9	.757
No. 19 Vanderbilt	11	–	7	.611	27	–	9	.750
No. 12 Tennessee	11	–	7	.611	25	–	12	.676
Texas A&M	11	–	7	.611	22	–	12	.647
Georgia	10	–	8	.556	22	–	11	.667
Missouri	10	–	8	.556	20	–	13	.606
Kentucky	10	–	8	.556	22	–	14	.611
No. 22 Texas	9	–	9	.500	21	–	15	.583
Oklahoma	7	–	11	.389	21	–	16	.568
Auburn	7	–	11	.389	22	–	16	.579
Mississippi State	5	–	13	.278	13	–	19	.406
South Carolina	4	–	14	.222	13	–	19	.406
Ole Miss	4	–	14	.222	15	–	20	.429
LSU	3	–	15	.167	15	–	17	.469
† 2026 SEC tournament winner Rankings from AP poll

The 2025–26 Kentucky Wildcats men's basketball team represented the University of Kentucky during the 2025–26 NCAA Division I men's basketball season. The Wildcats, founding members of the Southeastern Conference, played their home games at Rupp Arena and were led by Mark Pope in his second season as head coach for the Wildcats.

== Previous season ==
The Wildcats finished the 2024–25 season with a record of 24–12, 10–8 in SEC play to finish in a 3-way tie for seventh place in the SEC. The Wildcats earned a number six seed in the SEC tournament, they won the second-round game against Oklahoma then lost to Alabama in the quarterfinals. They received an at-large bid to the NCAA tournament where the Wildcats made it to the Sweet 16 by defeating Troy, 76–57, in the first round and Illinois, 84–75, in the second round. The Wildcats lost to rival Tennessee, 78–65, in the Sweet Sixteen, finishing the season with an overall record of 24–12.

== Offseason ==
=== Departures ===
Kentucky had 5 departures from the 2025 team that were lost to exhausted eligibility. On March 31 Kerr Kriisa announced his entry into the NCAA transfer portal. On April 8 Kriisa committed to play for Cincinnati. On April 22 Travis Perry put his name in the transfer portal. On May 4 Perry committed to play for SEC rival Ole Miss.

Name	Number	Pos.	Height	Weight	Year	Hometown	Reason for departure
Koby Brea	4	G	6'7"	206	Senior	Washington Heights, NY	Graduated
Lamont Butler	1	G	6'2"	204	Senior	Moreno Valley, CA	Graduated
Andrew Carr	7	F	6'10"	227	Senior	West Chester, PA	Graduated
Kerr Kriisa	77	G	6'3"	190	Senior	Tartu, Estonia	Transferred to Cincinnati
Travis Perry	11	G	6'1"	185	Freshman	Eddyville, KY	Transferred to Ole Miss
Jaxson Robinson	2	G	6'6"	191	Senior	Ada, OK	Graduated
Amari Williams	22	C	7'0"	265	Senior	Nottingham, England	Graduated

=== Incoming transfers ===
Prior to the end of the 2025 season Kentucky received its first transfer commitment for the next season from forward Kam Williams, who transferred from Tulane, on March 29. On April 5 guard Jaland Lowe, transferring from Pittsburgh, committed to play for Kentucky. Two days later on April 7 former Alabama forward Mouhamed Dioubate became the third transfer commitment. One day later, one of the top forwards in the portal, former Arizona State forward Jayden Quaintance committed. Quaintance was previously a signee with Kentucky in the 2024 class, but decommitted once former coach John Calipari became the Arkansas head coach. On April 21 former Florida guard Denzel Aberdeen committed. The last member of the transfer class is center Reece Potter, who committed on May 5 after transferring from Miami (OH). This years team, had a high NIL (Name Image and Likeness) value, of around $22M.

Name	Num	Pos.	Height	Weight	Year	Hometown	Previous college
Denzel Aberdeen	1	G	6'5"	180	Senior	Orlando, FL	Transferred from Florida
Mouhamed Dioubate	23	F	6'7"	215	Junior	Flushing, NY	Transferred from Alabama
Jaland Lowe	15	G	6'1"	180	Junior	Missouri City, TX	Transferred from Pittsburgh
Jayden Quaintance	21	F	6'10"	225	Sophomore	Cleveland, OH	Transferred from Arizona State
Reece Potter	33	F	7'1"	215	Junior	Lexington, KY	Transferred from Miami (OH)
Kam Williams	3	F	6'8"	190	Sophomore	Lafayette, LA	Transferred from Tulane

=== Class of 2025 signees ===
College recruiting information
Name	Hometown	School	Height	Weight	Commit date
Jasper Johnson #8 SG	Lexington, KY	Overtime Elite	6 ft 4 in (1.93 m)	170 lb (77 kg)	Sep 5, 2024
Jasper Johnson #8 SG	Recruit ratings: Rivals: 247Sports: ESPN: (89)				
Malachi Moreno #1 C	Georgetown, KY	Great Crossing High School	7 ft 0 in (2.13 m)	210 lb (95 kg)	Aug 16, 2024
Malachi Moreno #1 C	Recruit ratings: Rivals: 247Sports: ESPN: (88)				
Braydon Hawthorne #10 F	Beckley, WV	Huntington Prep	6 ft 8 in (2.03 m)	185 lb (84 kg)	May 22, 2025
Braydon Hawthorne #10 F	Recruit ratings: Rivals: 247Sports: ESPN: (83)				
Andrija Jelavić; F	Zagreb, Croatia	KK Mega Basket	6 ft 11 in (2.11 m)	225 lb (102 kg)	Apr 12, 2025
Andrija Jelavić; F	Recruit ratings: No ratings found				
Overall recruit ranking:
Note: In many cases, Scout, Rivals, 247Sports, On3, and ESPN may conflict in their listings of height and weight.; In these cases, the average was taken. ESPN grades are on a 100-point scale.; Sources: "Kentucky 2025 Basketball Commitments". Rivals.; "2025 Kentucky Basketball Commits". ESPN.; "2025 Team Ranking". Rivals.; "Kentucky 2025 Basketball Commits". 247Sports.

== Roster ==
2025–26 Kentucky Wildcats men's basketball team
Players
Coaches

Pos.	#	Name	Height	Weight	Year	Previous school	Hometown
G	00	Otega Oweh	6 ft 4 in (1.93 m)	220 lb (100 kg)	Sr	Oklahoma	Newark, NJ
G	1	Denzel Aberdeen	6 ft 5 in (1.96 m)	195 lb (88 kg)	Sr	Florida	Orlando, FL
G	2	Jasper Johnson	6 ft 5 in (1.96 m)	180 lb (82 kg)	Fr	Overtime Elite	Lexington, KY
F	3	Kam Williams (injured)	6 ft 8 in (2.03 m)	205 lb (93 kg)	So	Tulane	Lafayette, LA
F	4	Andrija Jelavić	6 ft 11 in (2.11 m)	225 lb (102 kg)	Fr	Mega Superbet	Zagreb, Croatia
G	5	Collin Chandler	6 ft 5 in (1.96 m)	205 lb (93 kg)	So	Farmington	Farmington, UT
G/F	9	Trent Noah (injured)	6 ft 5 in (1.96 m)	220 lb (100 kg)	So	Harlan County	Harlan, KY
C	10	Brandon Garrison (injured)	6 ft 10 in (2.08 m)	245 lb (111 kg)	Jr	Oklahoma State	Oklahoma City, OK
G	11	Walker Horn (W)	6 ft 3 in (1.91 m)	190 lb (86 kg)	Sr	Westlake	Austin, TX
G	15	Jaland Lowe (injured)	6 ft 2 in (1.88 m)	170 lb (77 kg)	Jr	Pittsburgh	Missouri City, TX
F	20	Zach Tow (W)	6 ft 5 in (1.96 m)	220 lb (100 kg)	Sr	Madisonville North Hopkins	Madisonville, KY
F	21	Jayden Quaintance (injured)	6 ft 11 in (2.11 m)	255 lb (116 kg)	So	Arizona State	Cleveland, OH
F	22	Braydon Hawthorne	6 ft 8 in (2.03 m)	190 lb (86 kg)	Fr	Huntington Prep	Beckley, WV
G	23	Mouhamed Dioubate	6 ft 7 in (2.01 m)	220 lb (100 kg)	Jr	Alabama	Flushing, NY
C	24	Malachi Moreno	7 ft 0 in (2.13 m)	250 lb (113 kg)	Fr	Great Crossing	Georgetown, KY
C	33	Reece Potter (injured)	7 ft 1 in (2.16 m)	230 lb (104 kg)	RS Jr	Miami (OH)	Lexington, KY

Head coach

- Mark Pope

Assistant coach(es)

- Alvin Brooks III
- Jason Hart
- Mark Fox
- Cody Fueger
- Mikhail McLean

Legend

- (C) Team captain
- (S) Suspended
- (I) Ineligible
- (W) Walk-on
- Injured
- Current redshirt

Roster

== Schedule and results ==
Date time, TV	Rank^{#}	Opponent^{#}	Result	Record	High points	High rebounds	High assists	Site (attendance) city, state
Exhibition
October 24, 2025*; 6:00 p.m., SECN	No. 9	No. 1 Purdue	W 78–65	–	15 – Johnson	9 – Dioubate	3 – Tied	Rupp Arena (19,906); Lexington, KY
October 30, 2025*; 7:00 p.m., SECN+/ESPN+	No. 9	Georgetown	L 70–84	–	17 – Oweh	6 – Tied	3 – Tied	Rupp Arena (19,251); Lexington, KY
Non-conference regular season
November 4, 2025*; 7:00 p.m., ESPN+/SECN+	No. 9	Nicholls; BBN United Tipoff Classic	W 77–51	1–0	15 – Chandler	9 – Moreno	6 – Aberdeen	Rupp Arena (19,289); Lexington, KY
November 7, 2025*; 7:00 p.m., ESPN+/SECN+	No. 9	Valparaiso; BBN United Tipoff Classic	W 107–59	2–0	18 – Moreno	10 – Moreno	5 – Tied	Rupp Arena (20,016); Lexington, KY
November 11, 2025*; 8:00 p.m., ESPN	No. 9	at No. 12 Louisville; Battle For The Bluegrass	L 88–96	2–1	26 – Aberdeen	7 – Aberdeen	5 – Lowe	KFC Yum! Center (22,586); Louisville, KY
November 14, 2025*; 7:00 p.m., ESPN+/SECN+	No. 9	Eastern Illinois; BBN United Tipoff Classic	W 99–53	3–1	20 – Dioubate	11 – Dioubate	7 – Johnson	Rupp Arena (20,000); Lexington, KY
November 18, 2025*; 6:30 p.m., ESPN	No. 12	vs. No. 17 Michigan State; Champions Classic	L 66–83	3–2	12 – Oweh	4 – Tied	3 – Tied	Madison Square Garden (19,327); New York, NY
November 21, 2025*; 7:00 p.m., ESPN+/SECN+	No. 12	Loyola (MD)	W 88–46	4–2	13 – Tied	11 – Garrison	6 – Aberdeen	Rupp Arena (19,764); Lexington, KY
November 26, 2025*; 7:00 p.m., SECN	No. 19	Tennessee Tech	W 104–54	5–2	16 – Tied	11 – Moreno	5 – Chandler	Rupp Arena (19,602); Lexington, KY
December 2, 2025*; 9:30 p.m., ESPN	No. 18	No. 16 North Carolina; ACC–SEC Challenge, rivalry	L 64–67	5–3	16 – Oweh	9 – Moreno	4 – Aberdeen	Rupp Arena (20,029); Lexington, KY
December 5, 2025*; 7:00 p.m., ESPN2	No. 18	vs. No. 11 Gonzaga	L 59–94	5–4	16 – Oweh	5 – Oweh	5 – Oweh	Bridgestone Arena (18,507); Nashville, TN
December 9, 2025*; 7:00 p.m., SECN		NC Central	W 103–67	6–4	22 – Johnson	7 – Tied	8 – Chandler	Rupp Arena (19,247); Lexington, KY
December 13, 2025*; 7:30 p.m., ESPN		Indiana; Rivalry	W 72–60	7–4	14 – Dioubate	12 – Dioubate	3 – Moreno	Rupp Arena (20,061); Lexington, KY
December 20, 2025*; 12:30 p.m., CBS		vs. No. 22 St. John's; CBS Sports Classic	W 78–66	8–4	22 – Oweh	9 – Moreno	3 – Tied	State Farm Arena; Atlanta, GA
December 23, 2025*; 1:00 p.m., ESPN+/SECN+		Bellarmine	W 99–85	9–4	26 – Williams	8 – Oweh	10 – Oweh	Rupp Arena (19,706); Lexington, KY
SEC regular season
January 3, 2026; 12:00 p.m., ESPN		at No. 14 Alabama	L 74–89	9–5 (0–1)	22 – Oweh	8 – Tied	3 – Oweh	Coleman Coliseum (13,474); Tuscaloosa, AL
January 7, 2026; 7:00 p.m., ESPN2		Missouri	L 68–73	9–6 (0–2)	20 – Oweh	5 – Oweh	4 – Tied	Rupp Arena (19,085); Lexington, KY
January 10, 2026; 8:30 p.m., SECN		Mississippi State	W 92–68	10–6 (1–2)	22 – Oweh	8 – Moreno	6 – Moreno	Rupp Arena (19,725); Lexington, KY
January 13, 2026; 7:00 p.m., SECN		at LSU	W 75–74	11–6 (2–2)	21 – Oweh	8 – Moreno	4 – Aberdeen	Pete Maravich Assembly Center (8,671); Baton Rouge, LA
January 17, 2026; 12:00 p.m., ESPN		at No. 24 Tennessee; Rivalry	W 80–78	12–6 (3–2)	22 – Aberdeen	6 – Tied	4 – Johnson	Thompson–Boling Arena (21,678); Knoxville, TN
January 21, 2026; 7:00 p.m., SECN		Texas	W 85–80	13–6 (4–2)	19 – Aberdeen	7 – Tied	6 – Moreno	Rupp Arena (19,298); Lexington, KY
January 24, 2026; 11:00 a.m., ESPN		Ole Miss	W 72–63	14–6 (5–2)	23 – Oweh	9 – Moreno	5 – Aberdeen	Rupp Arena (19,831); Lexington, KY
January 27, 2026; 9:00 p.m., ESPN		at No. 18 Vanderbilt	L 55–80	14–7 (5–3)	20 – Oweh	8 – Moreno	3 – Oweh	Memorial Gymnasium (10,195); Nashville, TN
January 31, 2026; 6:30 p.m., ESPN		at No. 15 Arkansas	W 85–77	15–7 (6–3)	24 – Oweh	8 – Oweh	3 – Tied	Bud Walton Arena (19,200); Fayetteville, AR
February 4, 2026; 9:00 p.m., ESPN2		Oklahoma	W 94–78	16–7 (7–3)	24 – Oweh	11 – Garrison	5 – Aberdeen	Rupp Arena (19,394); Lexington, KY
February 7, 2026; 8:30 p.m., ESPN		No. 25 Tennessee; Rivalry	W 74–71	17–7 (8–3)	21 – Oweh	7 – Garrison	3 – Tied	Rupp Arena (20,123); Lexington, KY
February 14, 2026; 3:00 p.m., ABC	No. 25	at No. 14 Florida; Rivalry	L 83–92	17–8 (8–4)	19 – Aberdeen	11 – Moreno	4 – Aberdeen	O'Connell Center (11,230); Gainesville, FL
February 17, 2026; 9:00 p.m., ESPN		Georgia	L 78–86	17–9 (8–5)	28 – Oweh	9 – Dioubate	4 – Tied	Rupp Arena (19,780); Lexington, KY
February 21, 2026; 8:30 p.m., ESPN		at Auburn	L 74–75	17–10 (8–6)	29 – Oweh	7 – Tied	4 – Moreno	Neville Arena (9,121); Auburn, AL
February 24, 2026; 7:00 p.m., SECN		at South Carolina	W 72–63	18–10 (9–6)	19 – Aberdeen	11 – Moreno	5 – Aberdeen	Colonial Life Arena (11,318); Columbia, SC
February 28, 2026; 2:00 p.m., ESPN		No. 25 Vanderbilt	W 91–77	19–10 (10–6)	23 – Tied	6 – Moreno	5 – Moreno	Rupp Arena (20,075); Lexington, KY
March 3, 2026; 7:00 p.m., ESPN2		at Texas A&M	L 85–96	19–11 (10–7)	24 – Oweh	9 – Oweh	8 – Aberdeen	Reed Arena (8,062); College Station, TX
March 7, 2026; 4:00 p.m., ESPN		No. 5 Florida; Rivalry	L 77–84	19–12 (10–8)	28 – Oweh	6 – Tied	4 – Tied	Rupp Arena (20,140); Lexington, KY
SEC Tournament
March 11, 2026; 12:30 p.m., SECN	(9)	vs. (16) LSU; First round	W 87–82	20–12	23 – Oweh	8 – Oweh	3 – Tied	Bridgestone Arena (12,722); Nashville, TN
March 12, 2026; 12:30 p.m., SECN	(9)	vs. (8) Missouri; Second round	W 78–72	21–12	21 – Oweh	7 – Dioubate	7 – Aberdeen	Bridgestone Arena (15,719); Nashville, TN
March 13, 2026; 1:00 p.m., ESPN	(9)	vs. (1) No. 4 Florida; Quarterfinal / Rivalry	L 63–71	21–13	17 – Aberdeen	5 – Tied	3 – Aberdeen	Bridgestone Arena (17,864); Nashville, TN
NCAA Tournament
March 20, 2026*; 12:15 p.m., CBS	(7 MW)	vs. (10 MW) Santa Clara; First round	W 89–84 ^{OT}	22–13	35 – Oweh	8 – Tied	7 – Oweh	Enterprise Center (17,192); St. Louis, MO
March 22, 2026*; 2:45 p.m., CBS	(7 MW)	vs. (2 MW) No. 6 Iowa State; Second round	L 63–82	22–14	20 – Aberdeen	8 – Oweh	3 – Moreno	Enterprise Center (16,348); St. Louis, MO
*Non-conference game. ^{#}Rankings from AP Poll. (#) Tournament seedings in parentheses. MW=Midwest. All times are in Eastern Time.

== Rankings ==
Ranking movements Legend: ██ Increase in ranking ██ Decrease in ranking — = Not ranked RV = Received votes
	Week																				
Poll	Pre	1	2	3	4	5	6	7	8	9	10	11	12	13	14	15	16	17	18	19	Final
AP	9	9	12	19	18	RV	RV	RV	RV	RV	—	RV	RV	RV	25	RV	—	RV	—	RV	RV
Coaches	9	8	13	18	18	RV	RV	RV	RV	RV	—	RV	RV	RV	RV	RV	—	RV	—	RV	RV
