= 2026–27 Ole Miss Rebels men's basketball team =

American college basketball season

2026–27 Ole Miss Rebels men's basketball
- Conference: Southeastern Conference
- Record: 4–0 (0–0 SEC)
- Head coach: Chris Beard (4th season)
- Assistant coaches: Mark Adams (3rd season); Petar Aleksić (1st season); Anthony Fobb (1st season); Al Pinkins (4th, 7th overall season); Brian Burg (4th season)
- Home arena: SJB Pavilion

2026–27 Southeastern Conference men's basketball standings
	Conf.				Overall
Team	W		L	PCT	W		L	PCT
Georgia	0	–	0	–	6	–	0	1.000
Texas A&M	0	–	0	–	6	–	0	1.000
No. 15 Vanderbilt	0	–	0	–	6	–	0	1.000
No. 16 Alabama	0	–	0	–	5	–	0	1.000
No. 25 LSU	0	–	0	–	5	–	0	1.000
South Carolina	0	–	0	–	5	–	0	1.000
No. 14 Tennessee	0	–	0	–	5	–	0	1.000
No. 6 Texas	0	–	0	–	5	–	0	1.000
Ole Miss	0	–	0	–	4	–	0	1.000
No. 1 Florida	0	–	0	–	6	–	1	.857
Mississippi State	0	–	0	–	5	–	1	.833
Missouri	0	–	0	–	5	–	1	.833
Oklahoma	0	–	0	–	4	–	1	.800
No. 20 Arkansas	0	–	0	–	4	–	2	.667
Kentucky	0	–	0	–	4	–	2	.667
Auburn	0	–	0	–	3	–	3	.500
† 2027 SEC tournament winner As of November 21, 2026; Rankings from AP poll

The 2026–27 Ole Miss Rebels men's basketball team will represent the University of Mississippi during the 2026–27 NCAA Division I men's basketball season. The Rebels, led by fourth-year head coach, Chris Beard, will play their home games at The Sandy and John Black Pavilion at Ole Miss in Oxford, Mississippi, and compete as members of the Southeastern Conference.

== Previous season ==
The Rebels finished the 2025–26 season 15–20, 4–14 in SEC play to finish in a tie for fourteenth place in the conference.

== Offseason ==
=== Departures ===
Ole Miss Departures
Name	Number	Pos.	Height	Weight	Year	Hometown	Notes
Malik Dia	0	F	6'9"	250	Senior	Murfreesboro, Tennessee	Graduated
Corey Chest	1	F	6'8"	220	Sophomore	New Orleans, Louisiana	Transferred to McNeese
AJ Storr	2	G	6'5"	205	Senior	Rockford, Illinois	Transferred to UNLV
Koren Johnson	3	G	6'1"	180	Junior	Seattle, Washington	Transferred to Portland State
James Scott	4	F	6'10"	225	Junior	Fayetteville, North Carolina	Transferred to Georgia
Hobert Grayson IV	5	G	6'4"	205	Senior	Gonzales, Louisiana	Graduated
Niko Bundalo	7	F	6'10"	215	Freshman	Canton, Ohio	Transferred to UT Arlington
Eduardo Klafke	8	G	6'5"	200	Sophomore	Franca, Brazil	Transferred to Butler
Tylis Jordan	10	F	6'9"	215	Freshman	Milledgeville, Georgia	Transferred to Georgia Tech
Travis Perry	11	G	6'1"	185	Sophomore	Eddyville, Kentucky	Transferred to Dayton
Kezza Giffa	13	G	6'1"	175	Senior	Paris, France	Graduated
Max Smith	22	G	6'1"	180	Senior	Austin, Texas	Graduated
Augusto Cassiá	88	F	6'8"	225	Junior	Salvador, Brazil	Transferred to UTEP

=== Incoming transfers ===
Incoming transfers
Name	Number	Pos.	Height	Weight	Year	Hometown	Previous School
Santiago Trouet	1	F	6'11"	218	Junior	Buenos Aires, Argentina	Arizona State
Roman Siulepa	4	F	6'6"	220	Sophomore	Brisbane, Australia	Pittsburgh
Dasear Haskins	8	G	6'8"	200	Junior	Willingboro, New Jersey	Saint Joseph's
Ben Henshall	10	G	6'5"	200	Senior	Perth, Australia	Perth Wildcats
Budd Clark	22	G	5'10"	165	Senior	Philadelphia, Pennsylvania	Seton Hall
Stefan Čičić	28	C	7'0"	260	Sophomore	Riverside, Illinois	Pepperdine
Christian Brown	88	F	6'8"	235	Sophomore	Franklin, Tennessee	James Madison

=== 2026 recruiting class ===
College recruiting
Name	Hometown	School	Height	Weight	Commit date
Jaron Saulsberry; F	Marietta, Georgia	Wheeler HS	6 ft 6 in (1.98 m)	170 lb (77 kg)	Oct 1, 2025
Jaron Saulsberry; F	Recruit ratings: Rivals: 247Sports: ESPN: (82)				
Yohance Connor; G	Charlotte, North Carolina	Combine Academy	6 ft 2 in (1.88 m)	170 lb (77 kg)	Nov 21, 2025
Yohance Connor; G	Recruit ratings: Rivals: 247Sports: ESPN: (81)				
Daniel Patton; F	Houston, Texas	Cypress Falls HS	6 ft 7 in (2.01 m)	205 lb (93 kg)	Apr 19, 2026
Daniel Patton; F	Recruit ratings: Rivals: 247Sports:				
Overall recruit ranking:
Note: In many cases, Scout, Rivals, 247Sports, On3, and ESPN may conflict in their listings of height and weight.; In these cases, the average was taken. ESPN grades are on a 100-point scale.; Sources: "Ole Miss 2026 Basketball Commitments". Rivals.; "2026 Team Ranking". Rivals.

== Roster ==
2026–27 Ole Miss Rebels men's basketball team
Players
Coaches

Pos.	#	Name	Height	Weight	Year	Previous school	Hometown
G	0	Budd Clark	5 ft 10 in (1.78 m)	165 lb (75 kg)	Sr	Seton Hall	Philadelphia, PA
F	1	Santiago Trouet	6 ft 11 in (2.11 m)	220 lb (100 kg)	Jr	Arizona State	Buenos Aires, Argentina
C	2	Micah Handlogten	7 ft 1 in (2.16 m)	255 lb (116 kg)	GS	Florida	Lake Norman, NC
F	4	Roman Siulepa	6 ft 6 in (1.98 m)	220 lb (100 kg)	So	Pittsburgh	Brisbane, Australia
G	6	Ilias Kamardine	6 ft 4 in (1.93 m)	180 lb (82 kg)	Sr	JDA Dijon Basket	Marseille, France
G	8	Dasear Haskins	6 ft 8 in (2.03 m)	200 lb (91 kg)	Jr	Saint Joseph's	Willingboro, NJ
G	10	Ben Henshall	6 ft 6 in (1.98 m)	200 lb (91 kg)	Sr	Perth Wildcats	Perth, Australia
F	11	Jaron Saulsberry	6 ft 6 in (1.98 m)	170 lb (77 kg)	Fr	Wheeler HS	Marietta, GA
F	22	Daniel Patton	6 ft 7 in (2.01 m)	205 lb (93 kg)	Fr	Cypress Falls HS	Houston, TX
G	23	Patton Pinkins	6 ft 5 in (1.96 m)	205 lb (93 kg)	So	Frenship HS	Lubbock, TX
C	28	Stefan Čičić	7 ft 0 in (2.13 m)	260 lb (118 kg)	So	Pepperdine	Riverside, IL
G	31	Zach Day	6 ft 5 in (1.96 m)	185 lb (84 kg)	So	Midland Christian	Midland, TX
G	55	Yohance Connor	6 ft 2 in (1.88 m)	170 lb (77 kg)	Fr	Combine Academy	Charlotte, NC
F	88	Christian Brown	6 ft 8 in (2.03 m)	235 lb (107 kg)	So	James Madison	Franklin, TN

Head coach

- Chris Beard (Texas)

Assistant coach(es)

- Mark Adams (Texas Tech)
- Brian Burg (Mount Mercy)
- Petar Aleksić (KK Leotar)
- Al Pinkins (NC State)

Legend

- (C) Team captain
- (S) Suspended
- (I) Ineligible
- (W) Walk-on
- Injured
- Current redshirt

Roster

== Schedule and results ==
Date time, TV	Rank^{#}	Opponent^{#}	Result	Record	High points	High rebounds	High assists	Site (attendance) city, state
Exhibition
October 15, 2026; 8:00 pm, SEC Network		vs. Alabama; Ballin in Boutwell	L 84–92		15 – Clark	7 – Trouet	7 – Clark	Boutwell Memorial Auditorium (2,495); Birmingham, AL
October 27, 2026*; 7:30 p.m., SECN+		UAB	W 92–78		18 – Clark	9 – Trouet	7 – Clark	SJB Pavilion; Oxford, MS
Non-conference regular season
November 2, 2026*; 7:30 p.m., SECN+		Alcorn State	W 99–58	1–0	17 – Clark	7 – Trouet	7 – Clark	SJB Pavilion (5,570); Oxford, MS
November 6, 2026*; 7:30 p.m., SECN+		Central Arkansas	W 92–60	2–0	19 – Pinkins	7 – Tied	6 – Clark	SJB Pavilion (6,392); Oxford, MS
November 10, 2026*; 7:30 p.m., SECN+		Southeastern Louisiana	W 91–51	3–0	23 – Clark	7 – Trouet	7 – Tied	SJB Pavilion (6,395); Oxford, MS
November 17, 2026*; 7:30 p.m., SECN+		Nicholls	W 76–41	4–0	16 – Trouet	8 – Siulepa	6 – Henshall	SJB Pavilion (5,947); Oxford, MS
November 23, 2026*; 1:30 p.m., ESPN2		vs. Clemson; Maui Invitational first round						Lahaina Civic Center; Lahaina, HI
November 24, 2026*		vs. BYU/Washington; Maui Invitational						Lahaina Civic Center; Lahaina, HI
November 25, 2026*		vs. Arizona/Colorado State/Providence/VCU; Maui Invitational						Lahaina Civic Center; Lahaina, HI
December 1, 2026*; 8:00 p.m., ACCNX		at Virginia Tech; ACC–SEC Challenge						Cassell Coliseum; Blacksburg, VA
December 7, 2026*; 7:00 p.m., SECN+		William & Mary						SJB Pavilion; Oxford, MS
December 12, 2026*; 1:00 p.m., SECN+		vs. Louisiana–Monroe						Landers Center; Southaven, MS
December 15, 2026*; 6:00 p.m., SECN+		Youngstown State						SJB Pavilion; Oxford, MS
December 19, 2026*; 6:00 p.m., ESPNU		vs. NC State						Mississippi Coliseum; Jackson, MS
December 22, 2026*; 3:00 p.m., SECN+		vs. Southern Miss						Mississippi Coast Coliseum; Biloxi, MS
December 28, 2026*; 6:00 p.m., SECN+		Jackson State						SJB Pavilion; Oxford, MS
SEC regular season
January 2, 2027; 12:00 p.m., SEC Network		Georgia						SJB Pavilion; Oxford, MS
January 5, 2027; 6:00 p.m., ESPN/2		at Kentucky						Rupp Arena; Lexington, KY
January 9, 2027; 8:00 p.m., ESPNU		Texas						SJB Pavilion; Oxford, MS
January 13, 2027; 8:00 p.m., SEC Network		at Alabama						Coleman Coliseum; Tuscaloosa, AL
January 16, 2027; 7:30 p.m., SEC Network		at Auburn						Neville Arena; Auburn, AL
January 23, 2027; 5:00 p.m., SEC Network		Texas A&M						SJB Pavilion; Oxford, MS
January 27, 2027; 8:00 p.m., ESPN2/U		Vanderbilt						SJB Pavilion; Oxford, MS
January 30, 2027; 5:00 p.m., SEC Network		at Missouri						Mizzou Arena; Columbia, MO
February 2, 2027; 8:00 p.m., ESPN/2		Kentucky						SJB Pavilion; Oxford, MS
February 5, 2027; 3:00 p.m., ESPN2		at LSU						Pete Maravich Assembly Center; Baton Rouge, LA
February 9, 2027; 8:00 p.m., SEC Network		at Arkansas						Bud Walton Arena; Fayetteville, AR
February 13, 2027; 7:30 p.m., SEC Network		Mississippi State						SJB Pavilion; Oxford, MS
February 17, 2027; 6:00 p.m., ESPN2/U		Tennessee						SJB Pavilion; Oxford, MS
February 20, 2027; 2:30 p.m., SEC Network		at South Carolina						Colonial Life Arena; Columbia, SC
February 24, 2027; 8:00 p.m., ESPN/2		at Florida						O'Connell Center; Gainesville, FL
February 27, 2027; 2:30 p.m., SEC Network		Oklahoma						SJB Pavilion; Oxford, MS
March 2, 2027; 9:00 p.m., SEC Network		Auburn						SJB Pavilion; Oxford, MS
March 6, 2027; 3:00 p.m., SEC Network		at Mississippi State						Humphrey Coliseum; Starkville, MS
SEC tournament
March 10–14, 2027		vs.						Bridgestone Arena; Nashville, TN
*Non-conference game. ^{#}Rankings from AP Poll. (#) Tournament seedings in parentheses. All times are in Central Time.

== See also ==
- 2026–27 Ole Miss Rebels women's basketball team
