= 2026–27 Alabama Crimson Tide men's basketball team =

American college basketball team

2026–27 Alabama Crimson Tide men's basketball
- Conference: Southeastern Conference

Ranking
- Coaches: No. 15
- AP: No. 16
- Record: 5–0 (0–0 SEC)
- Head coach: Nate Oats (8th season)
- Assistant coaches: Preston Murphy (4th season); Chris Fleming (2nd season); Brian Adams (3rd season)
- Home arena: Coleman Coliseum

2026–27 Southeastern Conference men's basketball standings
	Conf.				Overall
Team	W		L	PCT	W		L	PCT
Georgia	0	–	0	–	6	–	0	1.000
Texas A&M	0	–	0	–	6	–	0	1.000
No. 15 Vanderbilt	0	–	0	–	6	–	0	1.000
No. 16 Alabama	0	–	0	–	5	–	0	1.000
No. 25 LSU	0	–	0	–	5	–	0	1.000
South Carolina	0	–	0	–	5	–	0	1.000
No. 14 Tennessee	0	–	0	–	5	–	0	1.000
No. 6 Texas	0	–	0	–	5	–	0	1.000
Ole Miss	0	–	0	–	4	–	0	1.000
No. 1 Florida	0	–	0	–	6	–	1	.857
Mississippi State	0	–	0	–	5	–	1	.833
Missouri	0	–	0	–	5	–	1	.833
Oklahoma	0	–	0	–	4	–	1	.800
No. 20 Arkansas	0	–	0	–	4	–	2	.667
Kentucky	0	–	0	–	4	–	2	.667
Auburn	0	–	0	–	3	–	3	.500
† 2027 SEC tournament winner As of November 22, 2026; Rankings from AP poll

The 2026–27 Alabama Crimson Tide men's basketball team represent the University of Alabama during the 2026–27 NCAA Division I men's basketball season. The Crimson Tide, led by eighth-year head coach Nate Oats, play their home games at Coleman Coliseum located in Tuscaloosa, Alabama as a member of the SEC.

== Offseason ==
=== Departures ===
Alabama had one departure from the 2026 team that was lost to exhausted eligibility. On April 6 Aiden Sherrell and Taylor Bol Bowen submitted their entry into the NCAA transfer portal. On April 7, Labaron Philon declared for the 2026 NBA Draft. On April 7, Jalil Bethea entered the transfer portal. On April 12, Bethea committed to play for Pittsburgh for the 2026–27 season. On April 15, Sherrell committed to play for Indiana for the 2026–27 season. On April 18, Davion Hannah entered the transfer portal.On April 20, Hannah committed to play at South Carolina for the 2026–27 season. On April 22, Bol Bowen committed to play for Oregon for the 2026–27 season.

Name	Number	Pos.	Height	Weight	Year	Hometown	Reason for departure
Jalil Bethea	1	G	6'5"	190	Sophomore	Philadelphia, PA	Transferred to Pittsburgh
Taylor Bol Bowen	7	F	6'10"	202	Junior	Jericho, VT	Transferred to Oregon
Davion Hannah	4	G	6'6"	190	Freshman	Milwaukee, WI	Transferred to South Carolina
Labaron Philon	0	G	6'4"	185	Sophomore	Mobile, AL	Entered 2026 NBA Draft
Aiden Sherrell	22	F	6'11"	255	Sophomore	Detroit, MI	Transferred to Indiana

=== Incoming transfers ===
Alabama received its first transfer commitment for the 2026–27 season from center Brandon Garrison, who transferred from Kentucky, on April 12. On May 16, forward Jamarion Davis-Fleming, who transferred from Mississippi State, committed to play for Alabama On April 17, Alabama received a commitment from former NC State signee Cole Cloer, who will be a true freshman in 2026–27. On April 20, Drew Fielder, transferring from Boise State, committed to play for Alabama.

Name	Num	Pos.	Height	Weight	Year	Hometown	Previous college
Cole Cloer	33	F	6'7"	190	Freshman	Hillsborough, NC	Transferred from NC State
Jamarion Davis-Fleming	0	F	6'11"	225	Sophomore	Canton, MS	Transferred from Mississippi State
Drew Fielder	8	F	6'10"	240	Senior	Boise, ID	Transferred from Boise State
Brandon Garrison	9	C	6'11"	245	Senior	Oklahoma City, OK	Transferred from Kentucky

=== Class of 2026 signees ===
College recruiting
Name	Hometown	School	Height	Weight	Commit date
Tarris Bouie; F	Charlotte, North Carolina	SPIRE Academy	6 ft 6 in (1.98 m)	170 lb (77 kg)	Sep 10, 2025
Tarris Bouie; F	Recruit ratings: Rivals: 247Sports: ESPN:				
Jaxon Richardson #7 SF	Las Vegas, NV	Southeastern Prep	6 ft 6 in (1.98 m)	200 lb (91 kg)	Mar 5, 2026
Jaxon Richardson #7 SF	Recruit ratings: Rivals: 247Sports: ESPN: (91)				
Qayden Samuels #9 SG	District Heights, MD	Bishop McNamara	6 ft 6 in (1.98 m)	205 lb (93 kg)	Jan 30, 2026
Qayden Samuels #9 SG	Recruit ratings: Rivals: 247Sports: ESPN:				
Overall recruit ranking:
Note: In many cases, Scout, Rivals, 247Sports, On3, and ESPN may conflict in their listings of height and weight.; In these cases, the average was taken. ESPN grades are on a 100-point scale.; Sources: "Alabama 2026 Basketball Commitments". Rivals.; "2026 Alabama Basketball Commits". ESPN.; "2026 Team Ranking". Rivals.; "Alabama 2026 Basketball Commits". 247Sports.

== Roster ==
2026–27 Alabama Crimson Tide men's basketball team
Players
Coaches

Pos.	#	Name	Height	Weight	Year	Previous school	Hometown
F	0	Jamarion Davis-Fleming	6 ft 10 in (2.08 m)	245 lb (111 kg)	So	Mississippi State	Canton, Mississippi
G	1	Anderson Diaz	6 ft 2 in (1.88 m)	182 lb (83 kg)	Fr	Overtime Elite	Bronx, New York
G	2	Aden Holloway	6 ft 1 in (1.85 m)	185 lb (84 kg)	Sr	Auburn	Charlotte, North Carolina
G	3	Preston Murphy Jr.	6 ft 0 in (1.83 m)	190 lb (86 kg)	Sr	Northern Oklahoma College	Barrington, Rhode Island
F	4	Tarris Bouie	6 ft 6 in (1.98 m)	175 lb (79 kg)	Fr	SPIRE Academy	Charlotte, North Carolina
G	5	Amari Allen	6 ft 6 in (1.98 m)	215 lb (98 kg)	So	Ashwaubenon High School	Green Bay, Wisconsin
F	6	London Jemison	6 ft 8 in (2.03 m)	212 lb (96 kg)	So	St. Thomas More School	Bloomfield, Connecticut
F	8	Drew Fielder	6 ft 11 in (2.11 m)	242 lb (110 kg)	Sr	Boise State	Boise, Idaho
F	9	Brandon Garrison	6 ft 10 in (2.08 m)	255 lb (116 kg)	Sr	Kentucky	Oklahoma City, Oklahoma
F	10	Keitenn Bristow	6 ft 9 in (2.06 m)	216 lb (98 kg)	Jr	Tarleton State	Holliday, Texas
G	11	Qayden Samuels	6 ft 6 in (1.98 m)	225 lb (102 kg)	Fr	Bishop McNamara High School	Forestville, Maryland
C	21	TJ St. Louis	7 ft 0 in (2.13 m)	265 lb (120 kg)	Fr	Fort Erie International Academy	Fort Erie, Ontario
F	23	Jaxon Richardson	6 ft 6 in (1.98 m)	210 lb (95 kg)	Fr	Southeastern Prep Academy	Denver, Colorado
G	33	Cole Cloer	6 ft 8 in (2.03 m)	205 lb (93 kg)	Fr	NC State	Hillsborough, North Carolina
C	34	Collins Onyejiaka	6 ft 11 in (2.11 m)	265 lb (120 kg)	So	The Newman School	Boston, Massachusetts

Head coach

- Nate Oats (Maranatha Baptist)

Assistant coach(es)

- Preston Murphy (Rhode Island)
- Brian Adams (Connecticut College)
- Chris Fleming (Richmond)

Legend

- (C) Team captain
- (S) Suspended
- (I) Ineligible
- (W) Walk-on
- Injured
- Current redshirt

Roster
Last update: October 15, 2026

== Schedule and results ==
Date time, TV	Rank^{#}	Opponent^{#}	Result	Record	High points	High rebounds	High assists	Site (attendance) city, state
Exhibition
October 8, 2026*; 6:30 p.m.		Furman	W 111–93		19 – Allen	8 – Bouie	6 – Allen	Coleman Coliseum (3,259); Tuscaloosa, AL
October 15, 2026*; 7:00 p.m., SECN		vs. Ole Miss; Ballin in Boutwell	W 92–84		19 – Allen	10 – Fielder	5 – Allen	Boutwell Auditorium (2,495); Birmingham, AL
October 22, 2026*; 7:00 p.m., YouTube	No. 20	vs. Auburn; The Feud	W 87–85		23 – Allen	7 – Bouie	4 – Samuels	Legacy Arena (13,164); Birmingham, AL
Non-Conference Regular Season
November 3, 2026*; 6:30 p.m., SECN+	No. 20	Sam Houston	W 96–74	1–0	15 – Tied	7 – Bouie	5 – Samuels	Coleman Coliseum (11,612); Tuscaloosa, AL
November 6, 2026*; 6:30 p.m., SECN+	No. 20	Arkansas State	W 101–86	2–0	17 – Samuels	13 – Allen	11 – Allen	Coleman Coliseum (11,291); Tuscaloosa, AL
November 9, 2026*; 6:30 p.m., SECN+	No. 18	Oakland	W 109–68	3–0	20 – Jemison	6 – Cloer	6 – Allen	Coleman Coliseum (11,100); Tuscaloosa, AL
November 13, 2026*; 8:00 p.m., SECN	No. 18	Seton Hall	W 82–76	4–0	24 – Allen	7 – Garrison	5 – Allen	Coleman Coliseum (11,510); Tuscaloosa, AL
November 17, 2026*; 6:30 p.m., SECN+	No. 16	Kennesaw State	W 109–91	5–0	19 – Holloway	6 – Richardson	3 – Tied	Coleman Coliseum (10,971); Tuscaloosa, AL
November 24, 2026*; 9:00 p.m., ESPN2		vs. Baylor; Players Era 16 Bracket 2 First Round						T-Mobile Arena; Paradise, NV
November 26, 2026*; TBA		vs. Gonzaga/Kansas State; Players Era Festival Consolation/Semifinal						T-Mobile Arena; Paradise, NV
November 27, 2026*; TBA		vs. TBD; Players Era Festival						T-Mobile Arena/Michelob Ultra Arena; Paradise, NV
December 2, 2026*; 8:15 p.m., ESPN		at Miami; ACC-SEC Challenge						Watsco Center; Coral Gables, FL
December 8, 2026*; 5:30 p.m., ESPN		vs. Houston; Jimmy V Classic						Madison Square Garden; New York, NY
December 12, 2026*; 2:30 p.m., ESPN		vs. St. John's; C.M. Newton Classic						Legacy Arena; Birmingham, AL
December 16, 2026*; 6:00 p.m., ESPN2		at South Florida						Yuengling Center; Tampa, FL
December 21, 2026*; 6:00 p.m., Peacock		vs. Iowa						Casey's Center; Des Moines, IA
December 29, 2026*; 9:00 p.m., SECN		Samford						Coleman Coliseum; Tuscaloosa, AL
SEC regular season
January 2, 2027; 5:00 p.m., SECN		at Mississippi State						Humphrey Coliseum; Starkville, MS
January 5, 2027; 6:00 p.m., SECN		LSU						Coleman Coliseum; Tuscaloosa, AL
January 9, 2027; 1:00 p.m., ESPN2		at Arkansas						Bud Walton Arena; Fayetteville, AR
January 13, 2027; 8:00 p.m., SECN		Ole Miss						Coleman Coliseum; Tuscaloosa, AL
January 16, 2027; 1:00 p.m., ESPN/ESPN2		Florida						Coleman Coliseum; Tuscaloosa, AL
January 20, 2027; 5:00 p.m., SECN		at South Carolina						Colonial Life Arena; Columbia, SC
January 23, 2027; 7:30 p.m., SECN		Oklahoma						Coleman Coliseum; Tuscaloosa, AL
January 26, 2027; 8:00 p.m., ESPN		at Missouri						Mizzou Arena; Columbia, MO
January 30, 2027; 5:00/5:30 p.m., ESPN/ESPN2		Auburn; Rivalry						Coleman Coliseum; Tuscaloosa, AL
February 6, 2027; 1:00 p.m., ESPN/ESPN2		at Kentucky						Rupp Arena; Lexington, KY
February 9, 2027; 6:00 p.m., ESPN		at Texas						Moody Center; Austin, TX
February 13, 2027; 7:00 p.m., ESPN2		Arkansas						Coleman Coliseum; Tuscaloosa, AL
February 16, 2027; 8:00 p.m., SECN		Mississippi State						Coleman Coliseum; Tuscaloosa, AL
February 20, 2027; 1:00 p.m., ESPN/ESPN2		at Tennessee						Thompson-Boling Arena; Knoxville, TN
February 23, 2027; 8:00 p.m., SECN		at Texas A&M						Reed Arena; College Station, TX
February 27, 2027; 7:30 p.m., ESPN/ESPN2		Vanderbilt						Coleman Coliseum; Tuscaloosa, AL
March 3, 2027; 6:00 p.m., ESPN2/ESPNU		Georgia						Coleman Coliseum; Tuscaloosa, AL
March 6, 2027; 5:00 p.m., SECN		at Auburn; Rivalry						Neville Arena; Auburn, AL
SEC tournament
March 10–14, 2027; TBA		vs.						Bridgestone Arena; Nashville, TN
*Non-conference game. ^{#}Rankings from AP poll. (#) Tournament seedings in parentheses. All times are in Central Time.

== Rankings ==
Ranking movements Legend: ██ Increase in ranking ██ Decrease in ranking т = Tied with team above or below
	Week																				
Poll	Pre	1	2	3	4	5	6	7	8	9	10	11	12	13	14	15	16	17	18	19	Final
AP	20	18	16																		
Coaches	18т	16	15																		
