= 2026–27 Tennessee Volunteers basketball team =

American collegiate basketball team

2026–27 Tennessee Volunteers basketball
- Conference: Southeastern Conference

Ranking
- Coaches: No. 14
- AP: No. 14
- Record: 5–0 (0–0 SEC)
- Head coach: Rick Barnes (12th season)
- Assistant coaches: Earl Grant; Bryan Lentz; Steve McClain; Amorrow Morgan; Gregg Polisky
- Home arena: Thompson–Boling Arena

2026–27 Southeastern Conference men's basketball standings
	Conf.				Overall
Team	W		L	PCT	W		L	PCT
Georgia	0	–	0	–	6	–	0	1.000
Texas A&M	0	–	0	–	6	–	0	1.000
No. 15 Vanderbilt	0	–	0	–	6	–	0	1.000
No. 16 Alabama	0	–	0	–	5	–	0	1.000
No. 25 LSU	0	–	0	–	5	–	0	1.000
South Carolina	0	–	0	–	5	–	0	1.000
No. 14 Tennessee	0	–	0	–	5	–	0	1.000
No. 6 Texas	0	–	0	–	5	–	0	1.000
Ole Miss	0	–	0	–	4	–	0	1.000
No. 1 Florida	0	–	0	–	6	–	1	.857
Mississippi State	0	–	0	–	5	–	1	.833
Missouri	0	–	0	–	5	–	1	.833
Oklahoma	0	–	0	–	4	–	1	.800
No. 20 Arkansas	0	–	0	–	4	–	2	.667
Kentucky	0	–	0	–	4	–	2	.667
Auburn	0	–	0	–	3	–	3	.500
† 2027 SEC tournament winner As of November 21, 2026; Rankings from AP poll

The 2026–27 Tennessee Volunteers basketball team will represent the University of Tennessee during the 2026–27 NCAA Division I men's basketball season. The team will be led by 12th-year head coach Rick Barnes and play their home games at Thompson-Boling Arena located in Knoxville, Tennessee, as a member of the Southeastern Conference (SEC).

== Previous season ==
The Volunteers finished the 2025-26 season 25-12, 11-7 in SEC play to finish in a tie for fourth place. As the No. 5 seed in the SEC Tournament, held at Bridgestone Arena in Nashville, Tennessee, they received a double bye to the quarterfinals. There, they would be defeated by 4th seed Vanderbilt 75-68.

Tennessee received a bid to the 2026 NCAA tournament as the No. 6 seed in the Midwest region. There, they defeated Miami (OH), 78-56, in the first round, Virginia, 79-72, in the second round, and Iowa State, 76-62, in the Sweet Sixteen to advance to the Elite Eight for the third consecutive year. There, they would lose to the eventual NCAA champion Michigan.

== Offseason ==
=== Departures ===
Departures
Name	Number	Pos.	Height	Weight	Year	Hometown	Reason for departure
Ja'Kobi Gillespie	0	G	6'1"	188	Senior	Greeneville, TN	Graduated; drafted 42nd overall by the San Antonio Spurs
Amari Evans	1	G	6'5"	220	Freshman	Pittsburgh, PA	Transferred to Texas
Bishop Boswell	3	G	6'4"	204	Sophomore	Charlotte, NC	Transferred to Maryland
Clarence Massamba	4	G	6'5"	192	Freshman	Paris, France	Transferred to UC Davis
Grant Hurst	7	G	6'2"	205	(redshirt) Senior	Cleveland, TN	Graduated
Nate Ament	10	F	6'10"	207	Freshman	Manassa, VA	Declared for 2026 NBA draft; selected 13th overall by Miami Heat
Cade Phillips	12	F	6'9"	221	Junior	Jacksonville, AL	Transferred to Texas A&M
J. P. Estrella	13	F	6'11"	240	(redshirt) Sophomore	Scarborough, ME	Transferred to Michigan
Jaylen Carey	23	F	6'8"	267	Junior	Southwest Ranches, FL	Transferred to Missouri
Felix Okpara	34	F	6'11"	243	Senior	Lagos, Nigeria	Graduated; drafted 46th overall by the Orlando Magic
Ethan Burg	35	G	6'3"	199	Sophomore	Mishmar HaShiv'a, Israel	Signed to play professionally with Hapoel Jerusalem B.C.
Amaree Abram	77	G	6'3"	200	Senior	Port Arthur, TX	Transferred to Drexel

=== Incoming transfers ===
Incoming transfers
Name	Number	Pos.	Height	Weight	Year	Hometown	Previous school
Braeden Lue	0	F	6'8"	243	Junior	Douglasville, GA	Kennesaw State
Juke Harris	2	G	6'7"	205	Junior	Salisbury, NC	Wake Forest
Terrence Hill Jr.	3	G	6'2"	186	Junior	Portland, OR	VCU
Dai Dai Ames	4	G	6'2"	199	Senior	Chicago, IL	California
Tyler Lundblade	7	G	6'6"	216	6th	Dallas, TX	Belmont
Jalen Washington	9	F	6'10"	244	5th	Gary, IN	Vanderbilt
Jalen Haralson	10	G	6'7"	222	Sophomore	Anderson, IN	Notre Dame
Christian Fermin	12	F	6'10"	234	5th	Tobbyhanna, PA	VCU
Miles Rubin	25	C	6'10"	224	Senior	Chicago, IL	Loyola Chicago

=== Recruiting class ===
College recruiting
Name	Hometown	School	Height	Weight	Commit date
			N/A	N/A	
Recruit ratings: No ratings found
Overall recruit ranking:
Note: In many cases, Scout, Rivals, 247Sports, On3, and ESPN may conflict in their listings of height and weight.; In these cases, the average was taken. ESPN grades are on a 100-point scale.; Sources: "2026 Team Ranking". Rivals.

== Roster ==
2026–27 Tennessee Volunteers men's basketball team
Players
Coaches

Pos.	#	Name	Height	Weight	Year	Previous school	Hometown
F	0	Braedan Lue	6 ft 8 in (2.03 m)	243 lb (110 kg)	Jr	Kennesaw State	Douglasville, GA
G	1	Manny Green	6 ft 6 in (1.98 m)	212 lb (96 kg)	Fr	Cedar Grove HS	Decatur, GA
G	2	Juke Harris	6 ft 7 in (2.01 m)	205 lb (93 kg)	Jr	Wake Forest	Salisbury, NC
G	3	Terrence Hill Jr.	6 ft 2 in (1.88 m)	186 lb (84 kg)	Jr	VCU	Portland, OR
G	4	Dai Dai Ames	6 ft 2 in (1.88 m)	199 lb (90 kg)	Sr	California	Chicago, IL
F	6	DeWayne Brown II	6 ft 8 in (2.03 m)	248 lb (112 kg)	So	Hoover HS	Hoover, AL
G	7	Tyler Lundblade	6 ft 6 in (1.98 m)	216 lb (98 kg)	GS	Belmont	Dallas, TX
G	8	Marquis Clark	6 ft 2 in (1.88 m)	211 lb (96 kg)	Fr	Whitney M. Young HS	Chicago, IL
F	9	Jalen Washington (I)	6 ft 10 in (2.08 m)	244 lb (111 kg)	GS	Vanderbilt	Gary, IN
G	10	Jalen Haralson	6 ft 7 in (2.01 m)	222 lb (101 kg)	So	Notre Dame	Anderson, IN
G	11	Gavin Paull	5 ft 11 in (1.8 m)	166 lb (75 kg)	Jr	Westlake HS	Austin, TX
F	12	Christian Fermin	6 ft 10 in (2.08 m)	234 lb (106 kg)	GS	VCU	Tobyhanna, PA
F	13	Ralph Scott	6 ft 8 in (2.03 m)	211 lb (96 kg)	Fr	IMG Academy	Warwick, Bermuda
G	21	Campbell Duncan	6 ft 6 in (1.98 m)	208 lb (94 kg)	Jr	Anderson HS	Austin, TX
G	24	Troy Henderson	6 ft 1 in (1.85 m)	188 lb (85 kg)	So	John Marshall HS	Richmond, VA
C	25	Miles Rubin	6 ft 10 in (2.08 m)	224 lb (102 kg)	Sr	Loyola Chicago	Chicago, IL
F	33	Chris Washington Jr.	6 ft 9 in (2.06 m)	214 lb (97 kg)	Fr	Providence Christian Academy	Gainesville, FL

Head coach

- Rick Barnes (Lenoir–Rhyne)

Assistant coach(es)

- Earl Grant (Georgia College)
- Bryan Lentz (Lenoir–Rhyne)
- Steve McClain (Chadron State)
- Amorrow Morgan (Idaho State)
- Gregg Polinsky (Northern Arizona)

Legend

- (C) Team captain
- (S) Suspended
- (I) Ineligible
- (W) Walk-on
- (5th) Fifth-year senior
- (6th) Sixth-year senior
- Injured
- Current redshirt

Roster
Last update: October 24, 2026

== Schedule and results ==
Date time, TV	Rank^{#}	Opponent^{#}	Result	Record	High points	High rebounds	High assists	Site (attendance) city, state
Exhibition
October 15, 2026*; 7:00 p.m., SECN+		Xavier	L 70–86		22 – Hill Jr.	10 – Brown II	4 – Hill Jr.	Thompson-Boling Arena (10,986); Knoxville, Tennessee
October 20, 2026*; 7:00 p.m., ACCN	No. 8	at No. 2 Duke	L 64–103		19 – Ames	8 – Lue	2 – Harris	Cameron Indoor Stadium; Durham, North Carolina
Non-conference regular season
November 3, 2026*; 6:00 p.m., SECN	No. 8	Wofford	W 90–59	1–0	17 – Brown II	17 – Brown II	3 – Tied	Thompson-Boling Arena (18,389); Knoxville, Tennessee
November 9, 2026*; 7:00 p.m., SECN+	No. 11	Radford	W 70–47	2–0	18 – Hill Jr.	12 – Brown II	6 – Henderson	Thompson-Boling Arena (18,483); Knoxville, Tennessee
November 13, 2026*; 7:00 p.m., SECN+	No. 11	Tennessee State	W 83–78	3–0	19 – Hill Jr.	10 – Harris	5 – Hill Jr.	Thompson-Boling Arena (18,145); Knoxville, Tennessee
November 17, 2026*; 9:00 p.m., ESPN2	No. 14	No. 2 Michigan State	W 61–46	4–0	14 – Tied	8 – Rubin	4 – Harris	Thompson-Boling Arena (21,678); Knoxville, Tennessee
November 20, 2026*; 7:00 p.m., SECN+	No. 14	Coastal Carolina	W 78–51	5–0	20 – Brown II	11 – Brown II	7 – Hill Jr.	Thompson-Boling Arena (17,663); Knoxville, Tennessee
November 24, 2026*; 3:00 p.m., ESPN		vs. Maryland; Players Era Festival 16 - Bracket 1 First Round						Michelob Ultra Arena; Las Vegas, Nevada
November 26, 2026*; 1:00 or 3:30 p.m., ESPN		vs. Iowa State or San Diego State; Players Era Festival 16 - Bracket 1 Semifinal/Consolation Round						Michelob Ultra Arena; Las Vegas, Nevada
November 27, 2026*; ESPN2 or ESPNU		vs. Oregon or St. John's or Louisville or Texas Tech; Players Era Festival 16 - Bracket 1						Michelob Ultra Arena; Las Vegas, Nevada
December 1, 2026*; 7:00 p.m., ESPN2		Florida State; ACC-SEC Challenge						Thompson-Boling Arena; Knoxville, Tennessee
December 6, 2026*; 7:00 p.m., ESPN		vs. NC State; The Bad Boy Mowers Series - Nashville						Bridgestone Arena; Nashville, Tennessee
December 11, 2026*; 8:00 p.m., FOX		at Purdue						Mackey Arena; West Lafayette, Indiana
December 16, 2026*; 8:00 p.m., SECN		Morehead State						Thompson-Boling Arena; Knoxville, Tennessee
December 20, 2026*; 4:00 p.m., SECN		Marist						Thompson-Boling Arena; Knoxville, Tennessee
December 29, 2026*; 7:00 p.m., SECN+		Norfolk State						Thompson-Boling Arena; Knoxville, Tennessee
SEC regular season
January 2, 2027; 2:00 p.m., ESPN or ESPN2		Vanderbilt; Rivalry						Thompson-Boling Arena; Knoxville, Tennessee
January 6, 2027; 7:00 p.m., ESPN2 or ESPNU		at Auburn						Neville Arena; Auburn, Alabama
January 9, 2026; 8:30 p.m., SECN		at LSU						Pete Maravich Assembly Center; Baton Rouge, Louisiana
January 13, 2027; 7:00 p.m., ESPN2 or ESPNU		Missouri						Thompson-Boling Arena; Knoxville, Tennessee
January 16, 2027; 12:00 p.m., ESPN or ESPN2		Arkansas						Thompson-Boling Arena; Knoxville, Tennessee
January 23, 2027; 2:00 p.m., ESPN or ESPN2 or ESPNU		at Kentucky; Rivalry						Rupp Arena; Lexington, Kentucky
January 26, 2027; 7:00 p.m., ESPN or ESPN2		at Texas A&M						Reed Arena; College Station, Texas
January 30, 2027; 8:00 or 8:30 p.m., ESPN or ESPN2		Florida						Thompson-Boling Arena; Knoxville, Tennessee
February 3, 2027; 7:00 p.m., ESPN2		Georgia						Thompson-Boling Arena; Knoxville, Tennessee
February 6, 2027; 1:00 p.m., SECN		at Missouri						Mizzou Arena; Columbia, Missouri
February 10, 2027; 7:00 p.m., ESPN2 or ESPNU		at Oklahoma						Lloyd Noble Center; Norman, Oklahoma
February 13, 2027; 4:00 p.m., ESPN		Kentucky; Rivalry						Thompson-Boling Arena; Knoxville, Tennessee
February 17, 2026; 7:00 p.m., ESPN2 or ESPNU		at Ole Miss						SJB Pavilion; Oxford, Mississippi
February 20, 2027; 2;00 p.m., ESPN or ESPN2		Alabama						Thompson-Boling Arena; Knoxville, Tennessee
February 23, 2027; 7:00 p.m., SECN		South Carolina						Thompson-Boling Arena; Knoxville, Tennessee
February 27, 2027; 6:00 or 6:30 p.m., ESPN or ESPN2		at Texas						Moody Center; Austin, Texas
March 2, 2027; 6:00 p.m., SECN		Mississippi State; Senior Day						Thompson-Boling Arena; Knoxville, Tennessee
March 6, 2027; 2:00 p.m., ESPN or ESPNU		at Vanderbilt						Memorial Gymnasium; Nashville, Tennessee
SEC Tournament
March 10-14, 2027; TBD		vs. TBD; SEC Tournament						Bridgestone Arena; Nashville, Tennessee
*Non-conference game. ^{#}Rankings from AP Poll. (#) Tournament seedings in parentheses. All times are in Eastern Time.

== Game summaries ==
This section will be filled in as the season progresses.

=== Exhibition ===
==== Xavier ====
SECN+

October 15, 2026
7:00 p.m. EST/4:00 p.m. PST

Recap

Xavier Musketeers' 86, Tennessee Volunteers 70
Scoring by half: 27–35, 59–35
Pts: Nikos Chitikoudis - 17; Rebs: Tied - 7 Asts: Tru Washington - 12	Pts: Terrence Hill Jr. - 22; Rebs: Dewayne Brown II - 10; Asts: Tied - 3

Thompson-Boling Arena • Knoxville, Tennessee
Attendance: 10,986
Referees: Tony Chiazza, Bart Lenox, Courtney Green

==== at No. 2 Duke ====
ACCN

October 20, 2026
7:00 p.m. EST/4:00 p.m.

Recap

No. 8 Tennessee Volunteers 64, No. 2 Duke Blue Devils 103
Scoring by half: 30–54, 34–49
Pts: Dai Dai Ames - 19; Rebs: Braedan Lue - 8 Asts: Tied - 2	Pts: Deron Rippey Jr. - 21; Rebs: Patrick Ngongba - 7 Asts: Deron Rippey Jr. - 3

Cameron Indoor Stadium • Durham, North Carolina
Referees: Courtney Green, Lee Cassell, Ron Groover

=== Non- Conference Regular season ===
==== Wofford ====
SECN

November 3, 2026
6:00 p.m. EST/3:00 p.m.

Wofford Terriers vs. No. 8 Tennessee Volunteers
Scoring by half: –, –

Thompson-Boling Arena • Knoxville, Tennessee

==== Radford ====
SECN+

November 9, 2026
7:00 p.m. EST/4:00 p.m. PST

Radford Highlanders vs. No. 8 Tennessee Volunteers
Scoring by half: –, –

Thompson-Boling Arena • Knoxville, Tennessee

==== Tennessee State ====
SECN+

November 13, 2026
7:00 p.m. EST/4:00 p.m. PST

Tennessee State Tigers vs. No. 8 Tennessee Volunteers
Scoring by half: –, –

Thompson-Boling Center • Knoxville, Tennessee

==== Michigan State ====
ESPN2

November 17, 2026
9:00 p.m. EST/6:00 p.m. PST

Michigan State Spartans vs. Tennessee Volunteers
Scoring by half: –, –

Thompson-Boling Center • Knoxville, Tennessee

==== Coastal Carolina ====
SECN+

November 20, 2026
7:00 p.m. EST/4:00 p.m. PST

Coastal Carolina Chandeliers vs. Tennessee Volunteers
Scoring by half: –, –

Thompson-Boling Center • Knoxville, Tennessee

==== vs Maryland (Players Ear Festival 16 - Bracket 1 First Round) ====
ESPN

November 24, 2026
3:00 p.m. EST/12:00 p.m. PST

Tennessee Volunteers vs. Maryland Terrapins
Scoring by half: –, –

Michelob Ultra Arena • Las Vegas, Nevada

==== vs Iowa State or San Diego State (Players Ear Festival 16 - Bracket 1) ====
ESPN

November 26, 2026
1:00 p.m. EST/10:00 a.m. PST or
3:30 p.m. EST/12:30 p.m. PST

Tennessee Volunteers vs. Iowa State Cyclones or San Diego State Aztecs
Scoring by half: –, –

Michelob Ultra Arena • Las Vegas, Nevada

==== vs Oregon or St. John's or Louisville or Texas Tech (Players Ear Festival 16 - Bracket 1) ====
ESPN or ESPN2 or ESPNU

November 27, 2026
TBD p.m. EST/TBD p.m. PST

Tennessee Volunteers vs. Oregon Ducks or St. John's Red Storm or Louisville Cardinals or Texas Tech Red Raiders
Scoring by half: –, –

Michelob Ultra Arena • Las Vegas, Nevada

==== Florida State (ACC-SEC Challenge) ====
ESPN2

December 1, 2026
7:00 p.m. EST/4:00 p.m. PST

Florida State Seminoles vs. Tennessee Volunteers
Scoring by half: –, –

Thompson-Boling Center • Knoxville, Tenneessee

==== vs NC State (The Bad boy Mowers Series - Nashville) ====
ESPN

December 6, 2026
7:00 p.m. EST/4:00 p.m. PST

NC State Wolfpack vs. Tennessee Volunteers
Scoring by half: –, –

Bridgestone Arena • Nashville, Tennessee

==== at Purdue ====
FOX

December 11, 2026
8:00 p.m. EST/5:00 p.m. PST

Tennessee Volunteers vs. Purdue Boilermakers
Scoring by half: –, –

Mackey Arena • West Lafayette, Indiana

==== Morehead State ====
SECN

December 16, 2026
8:00 p.m. EST/5:00 p.m. PST

Morehead State Eagles vs. Tennessee Volunteers
Scoring by half: –, –

Thompson-Boling Arena • Knoxville, Tennessee

==== Marist ====
SECN

December 20, 2026
4:00 p.m. EST/1:00 p.m. PST

Marist Red Foxes vs. Tennessee Volunteers
Scoring by half: –, –

Thompson-Boling Arena • Knoxville, Tennessee

==== Norfolk State ====
SECN+

December 29, 2026
7:00 p.m. EST/4:00 p.m. PST

Norfolk State Spartans vs. Tennessee Volunteers
Scoring by half: –, –

Thompson-Boling Arena • Knoxville, Tennessee

== Rankings ==
Ranking movements Legend: ██ Increase in ranking ██ Decrease in ranking
	Week																				
Poll	Pre	1	2	3	4	5	6	7	8	9	10	11	12	13	14	15	16	17	18	19	Final
AP	8	11	14																		
Coaches	9	9	14																		
