= 2026–27 Houston Cougars men's basketball team =

American college basketball season

2026–27 Houston Cougars men's basketball

Players Era 8 champions
- Conference: Big 12 Conference

Ranking
- Coaches: No. 7
- AP: No. 8
- Record: 6–0 (0–0 Big 12)
- Head coach: Kelvin Sampson (13th season)
- Assistant coaches: K.C. Beard; Mike Ekanem; Hollis Price; Kellen Sampson
- Home arena: Fertitta Center

2026–27 Big 12 men's basketball standings
	Conf.				Overall
Team	W		L	PCT	W		L	PCT
No. 8 Houston	0	–	0	–	6	–	0	1.000
Arizona State	0	–	0	–	5	–	0	1.000
No. 21 BYU	0	–	0	–	5	–	0	1.000
No. 9 Texas Tech	0	–	0	–	5	–	0	1.000
No. 11 Kansas	0	–	0	–	5	–	1	.833
No. 12 Arizona	0	–	0	–	4	–	1	.800
Baylor	0	–	0	–	4	–	1	.800
Cincinnati	0	–	0	–	4	–	1	.800
TCU	0	–	0	–	4	–	1	.800
UCF	0	–	0	–	4	–	1	.800
Iowa State	0	–	0	–	3	–	1	.750
Kansas State	0	–	0	–	3	–	1	.750
Oklahoma State	0	–	0	–	3	–	1	.750
Utah	0	–	0	–	3	–	1	.750
West Virginia	0	–	0	–	4	–	2	.667
Colorado	0	–	0	–	2	–	3	.400
† 2027 Big 12 tournament winner As of November 20, 2026; Rankings from AP poll

The 2026–27 Houston Cougars men's basketball team will represent the University of Houston in the 2026–27 NCAA Division I men's basketball season. The Cougars will be led by 13th-year head coach Kelvin Sampson, and will play their home games at the Fertitta Center as fourth-year members of the Big 12 Conference.

== Previous season ==
As the No. 2 seed in the 2026 Big 12 men's basketball tournament, held at T-Mobile Center in Kansas City, Missouri, Houston received a bye to the quarterfinals. There, they defeated BYU, 73–66, to advance to the semifinals, where they would defeat Kansas, 69–47, to advance to the championship game, where they were defeated by No. 1 seed Arizona, 79–74.

Houston received a bid to the 2026 NCAA tournament, as the No. 2 seed in the South Region. They were seeded in the South region. There, they defeated Idaho, 78–44, in the First round, Texas A&M, 88–57, in the Second round. They were defeated by Illinois, 55–65, in the Sweet Sixteen. They finished the season 30–7 overall and 14–4 in conference play and finished ranked No. 7 in the AP Poll.

== Offseason ==
=== Departing players ===
Houston Departing Players
Name	Number	Pos.	Height	Weight	Year	Hometown	Reason for departure
Isiah Harwell	1	G	6'6"	220	Freshman	Pocatello, ID	Transferred to Gonzaga
Ramon Walker Jr.	3	G	6'5"	215	(redshirt) Senior	Pearland, TX	Graduated
Kingston Flemings	4	G	6'4"	190	Freshman	San Antonio, TX	Declared for the 2026 NBA draft; selected 8th overall by the Atlanta Hawks
Chris Cenac Jr.	5	F/C	6'11"	240	Freshman	New Orleans, LA	Declared for the 2026 NBA draft; selected 27th overall by the Boston Celtics
Milos Uzan	7	G	6'4"	195	Senior	Las Vegas, NV	Graduated
Cedric Lath	8	C	6'10"	265	(redshirt) Junior	Abidjan, Ivory Coast	Transferred to Nevada
Jacob McFarland	13	C	6'11"	225	(redshirt) Sophomore	Moreno Valley, CA	Transferred to Pacific
Kalifa Sakho	14	F	6'11"	230	Graduate Student	Rouen, France	Exhausted eligibility
Emanuel Sharp	21	G	6'3"	210	(redshirt) Senior	Tampa, FL	Graduated/declared for the 2026 NBA draft; selected 45th overall by the Sacramento Kings

=== Incoming transfers ===
Houston incoming transfers
Name	Number	Pos.	Height	Weight	Year	Hometown	Previous school
Corey Hadnot II	2	G	6'2"	185	Senior	Atlanta, GA	Purdue Fort Wayne
Braden East	4	F	6'9"	250	Junior	Houston, TX	Lamar
Chendall Weaver	7	G	6'3"	180	Graduate Student	Mansfield, TX	Texas
Dedan Thomas Jr.	9	G	6'1"	180	Senior	Las Vegas, NV	LSU
Delrecco Gillespie	23	F	6'8"	240	Graduate Student	Benton Harbor, MI	Kent State

=== 2026 recruiting class ===
College recruiting
Name	Hometown	School	Height	Weight	Commit date
Arafan Diané; C	Conakry, Guinea	Iowa United Prep	7 ft 1 in (2.16 m)	290 lb (130 kg)	Nov 19, 2025
Arafan Diané; C	Recruit ratings: Rivals: 247Sports: ESPN: (89)				
Ikenna Alozie; CG	Lagos, Nigeria	Dream City Christian	6 ft 2 in (1.88 m)	185 lb (84 kg)	Nov 21, 2025
Ikenna Alozie; CG	Recruit ratings: Rivals: 247Sports: ESPN: (88)				
Djafar Silimana; C	Ségou, Mali	Utah Prep Academy	6 ft 10 in (2.08 m)	240 lb (110 kg)	Apr 23, 2026
Djafar Silimana; C	Recruit ratings: No ratings found				
Tyus Thomas; PG	Henderson, NV	Liberty High School (NV)	5 ft 10 in (1.78 m)	180 lb (82 kg)	May 5, 2026
Tyus Thomas; PG	Recruit ratings: Rivals: 247Sports: ESPN: (80)				
Overall recruit ranking: 247Sports: 22 On3: 16 ESPN: 22
Note: In many cases, Scout, Rivals, 247Sports, On3, and ESPN may conflict in their listings of height and weight.; In these cases, the average was taken. ESPN grades are on a 100-point scale.; Sources: "2026 Houston Cougars Basketball Commits". ESPN.; "2026 Team Ranking". Rivals.; "Houston 2026 Basketball Commits". 247Sports.; "2026 Houston Cougars Basketball Commits". On3.

== Preseason ==
The Big 12 preseason coaches & media poll will be released in October 2026. All awards will be voted on by the league's 16 head coaches, who can not vote for their own team or players.

Big 12 Preseason Coaches Poll

	Big 12 Coaches	Points
1.	Arizona	220 (12)
2.	Houston	214 (4)
3.	Kansas	186
4.	Iowa State	181
5.	Texas Tech	180
6.	BYU	148
7.	TCU	137
T8.	Cincinnati	116
T8.	West Virginia	116
10.	Baylor	102
11.	Oklahoma State	98
12.	Arizona State	75
13.	UCF	55
T14.	Colorado	34
T14.	Kansas State	34
16.	Utah	24
Reference: (#) first-place votes

Big 12 Preseason Media Poll

	Big 12 Coaches
1.	Arizona
2.	Houston
3.	Kansas
4.	Texas Tech
5.	Iowa State
6.	BYU
7.	Baylor
8.	TCU
9.	Cincinnati
10.	West Virginia
11.	Oklahoma State
12.	Arizona State
13.	UCF
14.	Kansas State
15.	Colorado
16.	Utah

All-Big 12 Preseason First team

Player	School	Pos.	Yr.	Ht., Wt.	Hometown (Last School)
Ivan Kharchenkov	Arizona	F	So.	6'7", 230	Munich, Germany (Bayern Munich)
Motiejus Krivas	Arizona	C	Jr.	7'2", 260	Siauliai, Lithuania (BC Žalgiris)
Paulius Murauskas	Arizona State	F	Sr.	6'8", 235	Kaunas, Lithuania (St. Mary's)
Robert Wright III†	BYU	G	Jr.	6'1", 183	Wilmington, DE (Baylor)
Dedan Thomas Jr.	Houston	G	Sr.	6'1", 180	Las Vegas, NV (LSU)
Joseph Tugler	Houston	F	Sr.	6'8", 230	Houston, TX (Cypress Falls HS)
Tamin Lipsey	Iowa State	G	GS	6'1", 200	Ames, IA (Ames HS)
Tyran Stokes	Kansas	G	Fr.	6'7", 230	Louisville, KY (Rainer Beach HS)
Xavier Edmonds	TCU	F	Sr.	6'8", 252	Long Beach, CA (Salt Lake CC)
JT Toppin†	Texas Tech	F	Sr.	6'9", 230	Dallas, TX (New Mexico)
† denotes unanimous selection Reference:

- Player of the Year: Motiejus Krivas, Arizona
- Co-Newcomer of the Year: Paulius Murauskas, Arizona State
- Freshman of the Year: Tyran Stokes, Kansas

=== Award watch lists ===
Listed in the order that they were released

Award	Player	Position	Year	Source

== Roster ==
2026–27 Houston Cougars men's basketball team
Players
Coaches

Pos.	#	Name	Height	Weight	Year	Previous school	Hometown
G	0	Kordelius Jefferson	6 ft 3 in (1.91 m)	195 lb (88 kg)	Sr	Martin HS	Arlington, TX
G	1	Ikenna Alozie	6 ft 2 in (1.88 m)	190 lb (86 kg)	Fr	Dream City Christian School	Lagos, Nigeria
G	2	Corey Hadnot II	6 ft 2 in (1.88 m)	185 lb (84 kg)	Sr	Purdue Fort Wayne	Atlanta, GA
G	3	Tyus Thomas	6 ft 0 in (1.83 m)	180 lb (82 kg)	Fr	Liberty HS	Las Vegas, NV
F	4	Braden East	6 ft 9 in (2.06 m)	250 lb (113 kg)	Jr	Lamar	Houston, TX
G	6	Bryce Jackson	6 ft 6 in (1.98 m)	210 lb (95 kg)	So	Shadow Creek HS	Pearland, TX
G	7	Chendall Weaver	6 ft 3 in (1.91 m)	180 lb (82 kg)	GS	Texas	Mansfield, TX
G	9	Dedan Thomas Jr.	6 ft 1 in (1.85 m)	180 lb (82 kg)	Sr	LSU	Las Vegas, NV
F	11	Joseph Tugler	6 ft 8 in (2.03 m)	230 lb (104 kg)	Sr	Cypress Falls HS	Houston, TX
C	13	Arafan Diané	7 ft 0 in (2.13 m)	280 lb (127 kg)	Fr	Iowa United Prep	Conakry, Guinea
C	15	Djafar Silimana	6 ft 10 in (2.08 m)	240 lb (109 kg)	Fr	Utah Prep Academy	Ségou, Mali
F	23	Delrecco Gillespie	6 ft 8 in (2.03 m)	240 lb (109 kg)	GS	Kent State	Benton Harbor, MI
F	24	Chase McCarty	6 ft 6 in (1.98 m)	220 lb (100 kg)	Jr	IMG Academy	Huntsville, AL
G	25	Mercy Miller	6 ft 4 in (1.93 m)	200 lb (91 kg)	Jr	Notre Dame HS	Sherman Oaks, CA

Head coach

- Kelvin Sampson (UNC Pembroke)

Assistant coach(es)

- K.C. Beard (Boise State)
- Mike Ekanem (Texas Lutheran)
- Hollis Price (Oklahoma)
- Kellen Sampson (Oklahoma)

Legend

- (C) Team captain
- (S) Suspended
- (I) Ineligible
- (W) Walk-on
- Injured
- Current redshirt

Roster
Last update: September 10, 2026

== Schedule and results ==
Date time, TV	Rank^{#}	Opponent^{#}	Result	Record	High points	High rebounds	High assists	Site (attendance) city, state
Exhibition
October 15, 2026*; 7:00 p.m., ESPN+		Montana Tech	W 110–53	—	19 – McCarty	9 – Tugler	4 – Tied	Fertitta Center (4,772); Houston, TX
October 25, 2026*; 12:00 p.m., B1G+	No. 10	vs. No. 16 Michigan; The Battleground 2k26	W 83–66	—	25 – Thomas Jr.	6 – Tied	7 – Thomas Jr.	Van Andel Arena (8,524); Grand Rapids, MI
Non-conference regular season
November 2, 2026; 8:00 p.m., CBSSN	No. 10	La Salle	W 94–55	1–0	16 – Thomas Jr.	7 – Tied	5 – Tied	Fertitta Center (7,035); Houston, TX
November 8, 2026*; 7:30 p.m., The CW	No. 10	vs. California; Caesars Lake Tahoe Classic	W 86–68	2–0	20 – Thomas Jr.	8 – Gillespie	8 – Thomas Jr.	Tahoe Blue Event Center (2,496); Stateline, NV
November 11, 2026; 7:00 p.m., ESPN+	No. 8	Jacksonville State	W 92–46	3–0	17 – Thomas Jr.	8 – Tugler	7 – Thomas Jr.	Fertitta Center (7,035); Houston, TX
November 17, 2026*; 1:00 p.m., ESPN	No. 8	vs. Rutgers; Players Era 8 First Round	W 85–73	4–0	21 – Thomas Jr.	7 – Tugler	4 – Tied	Michelob Ultra Arena (3,923); Paradise, NV
November 18, 2026*; 3:30 p.m., ESPN	No. 8	vs. No. 1 Florida; Players Era 8 – Semifinal	W 86–76	5–0	30 – Thomas Jr.	10 – Tugler	3 – Tugler	Michelob Ultra Arena (4,325); Paradise, NV
November 19, 2026*; 10:00 p.m., ESPN	No. 8	vs. No. 11 Kansas; Players Era 8 – Championship	W 92–83	6–0	21 – Miller	8 – Tied	8 – Thomas Jr.	Michelob Ultra Arena (5,020); Paradise, NV
November 27, 2026; 6:30 p.m., CBSSN		Oakland						Fertitta Center; Houston, TX
November 29, 2026; 3:00 p.m., ESPN+		Queens						Fertitta Center; Houston, TX
December 2, 2026; 7:00 p.m., ESPN+		Central Arkansas						Fertitta Center; Houston, TX
December 5, 2026; 4:30 p.m., ESPN2		Texas State						Fertitta Center; Houston, TX
December 8, 2026*; 5:30 p.m., ESPN		vs. Alabama; Jimmy V Classic						Madison Square Garden; New York City, NY
December 13, 2026*; 2:30 p.m., ESPN		vs. LSU; Houston Hoopfest						Toyota Center; Houston, TX
December 20, 2026*; 12:00 p.m., ESPN/ESPN2		vs. Florida State; Jacksonville Hoops Showdown						VyStar Veterans Memorial Arena; Jacksonville, FL
December 29, 2026; 3:00 p.m., ESPN+		Texas A&M–Corpus Christi						Fertitta Center; Houston, TX
Big 12 regular season
January 2, 2027; 7:00 p.m., ESPN2		TCU						Fertitta Center; Houston, TX
January 5, 2027; 7:30 p.m., FS1		at Kansas State						Bramlage Coliseum; Manhattan, KS
January 10, 2027; 4:00 p.m., ESPN/ESPN2		at Baylor						Foster Pavilion; Waco, TX
January 13, 2027; 8:00 p.m., Peacock		Iowa State						Fertitta Center; Houston, TX
January 16, 2027; 7:00 p.m., ESPN/ESPN2		at Colorado						CU Events Center; Boulder, CO
January 19, 2027; 6:00 p.m., ESPN/ESPN2/ESPNU		Texas Tech						Fertitta Center; Houston, TX
January 23, 2027; 7:00 p.m., ESPN/ESPN2/ESPNU		at Arizona State						Desert Financial Arena; Tempe, AZ
January 30, 2027; 1:00 p.m., ESPN/ESPN2		BYU						Fertitta Center; Houston, TX
February 1, 2027; 8:00 p.m., ESPN		Kansas						Fertitta Center; Houston, TX
February 6, 2027; 3:00/3:30 p.m., ESPN		at Arizona						McKale Center; Tucson, AZ
February 10, 2027; 7:00 p.m., Peacock		at UCF						Addition Financial Arena; Orlando, FL
February 13, 2027; 3:00 p.m., ESPN2/ESPNU		Utah						Fertitta Center; Houston, TX
February 15, 2027; 8:00 p.m., ESPN		at Texas Tech						United Supermarkets Arena; Lubbock, TX
February 21, 2027; 3:00 p.m., FS1		Oklahoma State						Fertitta Center; Houston, TX
February 24, 2027; 8:00 p.m., ESPN2/ESPNU		Colorado						Fertitta Center; Houston, TX
February 27, 2027; 11:00 a.m., CBS		at West Virginia						Hope Coliseum; Morgantown, WV
March 2, 2027; 6:00 p.m., Peacock		at Cincinnati						Fifth Third Arena; Cincinnati, OH
March 6, 2027; 7:00/7:30 p.m., ESPN		Arizona						Fertitta Center; Houston, TX
Big 12 tournament
March 9–13, 2027; TBD, ESPN+/ESPN		vs. TBD; First Round						T-Mobile Center; Kansas City, MO
*Non-conference game. ^{#}Rankings from AP poll. (#) Tournament seedings in parentheses. All times are in Central Time.

== Rankings ==
Ranking movements Legend: ██ Increase in ranking ██ Decrease in ranking
	Week																				
Poll	Pre	1	2	3	4	5	6	7	8	9	10	11	12	13	14	15	16	17	18	19	Final
AP	10	8	8																		
Coaches	8	8	7																		
