= Kam Williams =

American basketball player (born 2005)

No. 3 – Kentucky Wildcats
- Position: Shooting guard
- League: Southeastern Conference

Personal information
- Born: November 22, 2005 (age 21)
- Listed height: 6 ft 7 in (2.01 m)
- Listed weight: 210 lb (95 kg)

Career information
- High school: Lafayette Christian Academy (Lafayette, Louisiana)
- College: Tulane (2024–2025); Kentucky (2025–present)

Career highlights
- AAC All-Freshman Team (2025)

Kameron Williams (born November 22, 2005) is an American college basketball player for the Kentucky Wildcats of the Southeastern Conference (SEC). He previously played for the Tulane Green Wave.

== Early life and high school career ==
Coming out of high school, Williams was rated as a four-star recruit and committed to play college basketball for the Tulane Green Wave.

== College career ==
=== Tulane ===
On November 19, 2024, Williams totaled eight points, ten rebounds, and four assists in a victory over Bethune–Cookman. On December 2, he notched 19 points versus Southeastern Louisiana. On March 9, 2025, Williams tied a career-high with six three-pointers in a blowout win over UAB. In the semifinals of the 2025 AAC tournament, he recorded 16 points and eight rebounds in a one-point loss to Memphis. As a freshman in 2024–25, Williams appeared in 33 games with 28 starts and averaged 9.3 points, 4.5 rebounds, 1.4 steals, 1.3 assists, and 1.1 blocks per game. He was named to the AAC All-Freshman team and entered his name into the NCAA transfer portal after the season.

=== Kentucky ===
Williams transferred to play for the Kentucky Wildcats. He broke his foot on January 21, 2026 but returned in time for postseason play. As a sophomore, Williams averaged 6.0 points, 2.1 rebounds and 1.0 assists per game.

== Career statistics ==
Legend
GP	Games played	GS	Games started	MPG	Minutes per game
FG%	Field goal percentage	3P%	3-point field goal percentage	FT%	Free throw percentage
RPG	Rebounds per game	APG	Assists per game	SPG	Steals per game
BPG	Blocks per game	PPG	Points per game	**Bold**	Career high

=== College ===
Year	Team	GP	GS	MPG	FG%	3P%	FT%	RPG	APG	SPG	BPG	PPG
2024–25	Tulane	33	28	32.4	.485	.412	.760	4.5	1.3	1.4	1.1	9.3
2025–26	Kentucky	24	7	18.5	.449	.359	.955	2.1	1.0	0.6	0.3	6.0
