= Jaland Lowe =

American basketball player (born 2004)

No. 15 – Georgetown Hoyas
- Position: Point guard
- Conference: Big East Conference

Personal information
- Born: September 6, 2004 (age 22) Missouri City, Texas, U.S.
- Listed height: 6 ft 3 in (1.91 m)
- Listed weight: 188 lb (85 kg)

Career information
- High school: Thurgood Marshall (Missouri City, Texas)
- College: Pittsburgh (2023–2025); Kentucky (2025–2026); Georgetown (2026–present)

Career highlights
- Third-team All-ACC (2025)

Jaland Lowe (born September 6, 2004) is an American college basketball player for the Georgetown Hoyas of the Big East Conference. He previously played for the Pittsburgh Panthers and Kentucky Wildcats.

== High school career ==
Lowe attended The Kinkaid School and then transferred as a sophomore to Fort Bend Marshall High School in Missouri City, Texas where he was a four-star guard. He scored 26.4 points, 8.1 rebounds, and 4.3 assists per game. Prior to his senior season, Lowe shined on the Nike EYBL circuit averaging 18 points per game to earn First Team All-Peach Jam honors.

In January 2023, Lowe was announced as a nominee for the 2023 McDonald's All American Game.

=== Recruiting ===
Lowe was rated a four-star recruit and committed to play college basketball at Pittsburgh over offers from SMU and Memphis, among other schools. Lowe's father, Marland, knew head coach Jeff Capel. Capel became a resource for the Lowe family during Lowe's middle school days.

In June 2023, Lowe became the fourth Pitt commit ever and the first since 2012 to earn a spot on the Jordan Brand Classic Team.

College recruiting
Name	Hometown	School	Height	Weight	Commit date
Jaland Lowe; PG	Missouri City, TX	Fort Bend Marshall (TX)	6 ft 1 in (1.85 m)	160 lb (73 kg)	Oct 1, 2022
Jaland Lowe; PG	Recruit ratings: Rivals: 247Sports: ESPN: (84)				
Overall recruit ranking: Rivals: 119 247Sports: 89 ESPN: 80
Note: In many cases, Scout, Rivals, 247Sports, On3, and ESPN may conflict in their listings of height and weight.; In these cases, the average was taken. ESPN grades are on a 100-point scale.; Sources: "Pittsburgh 2023 Basketball Commitments". Rivals.; "2023 Pittsburgh Panthers Recruiting Class". ESPN.; "2023 Team Ranking". Rivals.

== College career ==
=== Pittsburgh ===
During his freshman season, Lowe played in 33 games and averaged 9.6 points, 2.8 rebounds, and 3.3 assists per game.

In July 2024, Lowe participated at the CP3 Elite Camp in Las Vegas, NV. The camp was led by Chris Paul and he was joined by 15 other top college guards at the camp. In August 2024, Lowe was invited to participate in the Nike Elite Skills event that takes place at the Nike Basketball Academy in Portland, OR.

In March 2025, Lowe was named Third Team All-ACC.

After playing two seasons at Pittsburgh, Lowe entered the NCAA transfer portal and transferred to the University of Kentucky.

=== Kentucky ===
Prior to the season, Lowe was named to the preseason All-SEC Third Team. However, due to a shoulder injury sustained during a pre-season scrimmage, Lowe only played in 9 games at Kentucky. On March 28, 2026, he announced his intention to re-enter the transfer portal.

=== Georgetown ===
On April 13, 2026, Lowe announced that he would transfer to Georgetown University to play for Ed Cooley, who was the first coach to contact him after he entered the transfer portal. He also announced that he would seek a medical redshirt waiver from the NCAA in light of the shoulder injury that ended his previous season.

== Career statistics ==
Legend
GP	Games played	GS	Games started	MPG	Minutes per game
FG%	Field goal percentage	3P%	3-point field goal percentage	FT%	Free throw percentage
RPG	Rebounds per game	APG	Assists per game	SPG	Steals per game
BPG	Blocks per game	PPG	Points per game	**Bold**	Career high

=== College ===
Year	Team	GP	GS	MPG	FG%	3P%	FT%	RPG	APG	SPG	BPG	PPG
2023–24	Pittsburgh	**33**	19	26.6	**.388**	**.352**	.855	2.8	3.3	.8	.1	9.6
2024–25	Pittsburgh	31	**31**	**35.4**	.376	.266	**.886**	**4.2**	**5.5**	**1.8**	**.2**	**16.8**
2025–26	Kentucky	9	2	18.6	.358	.208	.704	2.1	2.4	.7	**.2**	8.0
Career:		73	52	29.3	.379	.289	.859	3.3	4.1	1.2	0.2	12.4

== Personal life ==
Lowe is the son of Jamailah and Marland Lowe. He has two younger siblings, Eian and Landon. He has Filipino lineage through his mother. His godfather, John Lucas was the No.1 pick in the 1976 NBA Draft and played in the NBA from 1976 to 1990.
