= 2026–27 NCAA Division I men's basketball rankings =

Rankings for the 2026–27 NCAA Division I men's basketball season

- Season: 2026–27
- NCAA Tournament: 2027
- Preseason No. 1: Florida
NCAA Division I men's basketball rankings
← 2025–26

Two human polls make up the 2026–27 NCAA Division I men's basketball rankings, the AP poll and the Coaches Poll, in addition to various publications' preseason polls.

== Legend ==
	Increase in ranking
	Decrease in ranking
	New to rankings from previous week
	No movement from previous week
Italics	Number of first-place votes
(#–#)	Win–loss record
т	Tied with team above or below also with this symbol

== AP poll ==
	Preseason Oct 19	Week 1 Nov 9	Week 2 Nov 16	Week 3	Week 4	Week 5	Week 6	Week 7	Week 8	Week 9	Week 10	Week 11	Week 12	Week 13	Week 14	Week 15	Week 16	Week 17	Week 18	Week 19	Final	
1.	Florida (47)	Florida (2–0) (53)	Florida (4–0) (56)																			1.
2.	Duke (10)	Duke (2–0) (7)	Michigan State (4–0) (3)																			2.
3.	Illinois (2)	Illinois (2–0)	UConn (4–0)																			3.
4.	UConn	UConn (2–0)	Virginia (5–0)																			4.
5.	Arizona	Michigan State (2–0)	Duke (3–1)																			5.
6.	Michigan State	Virginia (3–0)	Texas (4–0)																			6.
7.	Texas	Texas (2–0)	UCLA (4–0)																			7.
8.	Tennessee	Houston (2–0)	Houston (3–0)																			8.
9.	Virginia	UCLA (2–0)	Texas Tech (4–0)																			9.
10.	Houston	Louisville (2–0)	Illinois (3–1)																			10.
11.	Louisville	Tennessee (1–0)	Kansas (3–0)																			11.
12.	Arkansas	Arizona (1–1)	Arizona (3–1)																			12.
13.	St. John's	St. John's (2–0)	St. John's (4–0)																			13.
14.	Miami (FL)	Gonzaga (2–0)	Tennessee (3–0)																			14.
15.	Gonzaga	Kansas (2–0)	Vanderbilt (4–0)																			15.
16.	Michigan	Texas Tech (2–0)	Alabama (4–0)																			16.
17.	Kansas	Miami (FL) (1–1)	Miami (FL) (3–1)																			17.
18.	Iowa State	Alabama (2–0)	Michigan (3–1)т																			18.
19.	Texas Tech	Arkansas (1–1)	USC (4–0)т																			19.
20.	Alabama	Michigan (1–1)	Arkansas (3–1)																			20.
21.	USC	USC (2–0)	BYU (4–0)																			21.
22.	UCLA	Vanderbilt (2–0)	Gonzaga (2–1)																			22.
23.	Kentucky	BYU (2–0)	Louisville (2–1)																			23.
24.	Vanderbilt	Kentucky (2–0)	Nebraska (4–0)																			24.
25.	BYU	Nebraska (2–0)	LSU (4–0)																			25.
	Preseason Oct 19	Week 1 Nov 9	Week 2 Nov 16	Week 3	Week 4	Week 5	Week 6	Week 7	Week 8	Week 9	Week 10	Week 11	Week 12	Week 13	Week 14	Week 15	Week 16	Week 17	Week 18	Week 19	Final	
		Dropped: Iowa State (1–1)	Dropped: Kentucky (3–1)	None	None	None	None	None	None	None	None	None	None	None	None	None	None	None	None	None	None	

== USA Today Coaches Poll ==
	Preseason Oct 19	Week 1 Nov 9	Week 2 Nov 16	Week 3	Week 4	Week 5	Week 6	Week 7	Week 8	Week 9	Week 10	Week 11	Week 12	Week 13	Week 14	Week 15	Week 16	Week 17	Week 18	Week 19	Final	
1.	Florida (20)	Florida (2–0) (22)	Florida (4–0) (29)																			1.
2.	Duke (8)	Duke (2–0) (9)	UConn (4–0)																			2.
3.	Illinois (2)	Illinois (2–0) (1)	Michigan State (4–0) (2)																			3.
4.	Arizona	UConn (2–0)	Duke (3–1) (1)																			4.
5.	UConn	Michigan State (2–0)	Virginia (5–0)																			5.
6.	Michigan State	Virginia (3–0)	Texas (4–0)																			6.
7.	Texas	Texas (2–0)	Houston (3–0)																			7.
8.	Houston	Houston (2–0)	Illinois (3–1)																			8.
9.	Tennessee	Tennessee (1–0)	Kansas (3–0)																			9.
10.	Virginia	Louisville (2–0)	UCLA (3–0)																			10.
11.	Louisville	Arizona (1–1)	Texas Tech (4–0)																			11.
12.	Gonzaga	Gonzaga (2–0)	Arizona (3–1)																			12.
13.	Arkansas	St. John's (2–0)	St. John's (4–0)																			13.
14.	St. John'sт	Kansas (2–0)	Tennessee (3–0)																			14.
15.	Iowa Stateт	UCLA (2–0)	Alabama (4–0)																			15.
16.	Texas Tech	Alabama (2–0)	Vanderbilt (4–0)																			16.
17.	Miami (FL)	Texas Tech (2–0)	Miami (FL) (3–1)																			17.
18.	Kansasт	Miami (FL) (1–1)	Louisville (2–1)																			18.
19.	Alabamaт	Vanderbilt (2–0)	Gonzaga (2–1)																			19.
20.	Michigan	Arkansas (1–1)	Nebraska (4–0)																			20.
21.	Vanderbilt	Michigan (1–1)	Michigan (3–1)																			21.
22.	USC	USC (2–0)	USC (4–0)																			22.
23.	Kentucky	Iowa State (1–1)	Arkansas (3–1)																			23.
24.	Purdue	Nebraska (2–0)	BYU (4–0)																			24.
25.	BYU	BYU (2–0)	LSU (4–0)																			25.
	Preseason Oct 19	Week 1 Nov 9	Week 2 Nov 16	Week 3	Week 4	Week 5	Week 6	Week 7	Week 8	Week 9	Week 10	Week 11	Week 12	Week 13	Week 14	Week 15	Week 16	Week 17	Week 18	Week 19	Final	
		Dropped: Kentucky (2–0); Purdue (1–1)	Dropped: Iowa State (3–1)	None	None	None	None	None	None	None	None	None	None	None	None	None	None	None	None	None	None	

== See also ==
- 2026–27 NCAA Division I women's basketball rankings
