= Alex Wilkins =

American basketball player (born 2007)

No. 10 – Kentucky Wildcats
- Position: Shooting guard / point guard
- Conference: Southeastern Conference

Personal information
- Born: 2007 (age 18–19)
- Listed height: 6 ft 6 in (1.98 m)
- Listed weight: 170 lb (77 kg)

Career information
- High school: Brooks School (North Andover, Massachusetts)
- College: Furman (2025–2026); Kentucky (2026–present)

Career highlights
- Second-team All-SoCon (2026); SoCon Tournament MVP (2026)

Alex Wilkins is an American college basketball player for the Kentucky Wildcats of the Southeastern Conference (SEC). He previously played for the Furman Paladins, where he earned Southern Conference (SoCon) Tournament MVP honors as a freshman before transferring to Kentucky in April 2026.

== Early life and High School Career ==
Wilkins grew up in Mattapan, Massachusetts. He attended the Brooks School, a private preparatory school in North Andover, Massachusetts, where he emerged as a highly regarded backcourt prospect. Standing 6 feet 5 inches and weighing 175 pounds, his combination of size, pure shot-creating ability, and passing vision drew significant mid-major and high-major recruitment attention.

== College Career ==
=== Furman (2025-2026) ===
Wilkins committed to Furman University to play for the Paladins. As a true freshman during the 2025–26 season, he primarily operated at the point guard position. Wilkins quickly established himself as a premier scoring option in the Southern Conference, averaging 17.8 points and 4.7 assists per game while shooting 46.0% from the field and 82.4% from the free-throw line.

He scored in double digits in nearly every game of his freshman campaign, recording 14 separate 20-point performances. Wilkins saved his best performances for March, leading the Paladins through the conference tournament to secure the 2026 SoCon Tournament MVP and a spot on the All-Southern Conference Second Team.

In the opening round of the 2026 NCAA Tournament, Wilkins led Furman against the UConn Huskies, scoring 21 points and hitting 4-of-8 shots from beyond the arc in an 82–71 defeat.

=== Kentucky (2026-present) ===
On April 18, 2026, Wilkins officially entered the NCAA transfer portal and committed to head coach Mark Pope and the Kentucky Wildcats. Ranked by recruiting analysts as one of the top 35 transfer players in the country, Wilkins joined the Wildcats with three years of remaining eligibility.
