= Braydon Hawthorne =

American basketball player (born 2007)

No. 2 – Kentucky Wildcats
- Position: Small forward
- Conference: Southeastern Conference

Personal information
- Born: February 11, 2007 (age 19)
- Listed height: 6 ft 8 in (2.03 m)
- Listed weight: 195 lb (88 kg)

Career information
- High school: Woodrow Wilson (Beckley, West Virginia); Huntington Prep (Huntington, West Virginia)
- College: Kentucky (2026–present)

Braydon Hawthorne (born February 11, 2007) is an American college basketball player for the Kentucky Wildcats of the Southeastern Conference (SEC).

== Early life and high school career ==
Hawthorne grew up in Beckley, West Virginia, and initially attended Woodrow Wilson High School before transferring to Huntington Prep for his senior season. At Huntington he averaged 23.5 points and 6 rebounds per game.

=== Recruiting ===
A consensus four-star prospect, Hawthorne rose from a sub-100 ranking to the top 40 by the end of his senior year. He initially committed to West Virginia, however he reopened his recruitment after then West Virginia coach Darian DeVries took the same position at Indiana. Hawthorne ultimately chose to play for Kentucky over offers from Duke, Pittsburgh, and Virginia Tech.

== College career ==
Hawthorne redshirted his freshman season at Kentucky. He returns for the 2026–27 season as a redshirt freshman.

== Personal life ==
Hawthorne has 3 brothers and sisters including Zyon, who will be a freshman on the Kentucky roster for the 2026–27 season.
