= Brandon Garrison =

American basketball player (born 2004)

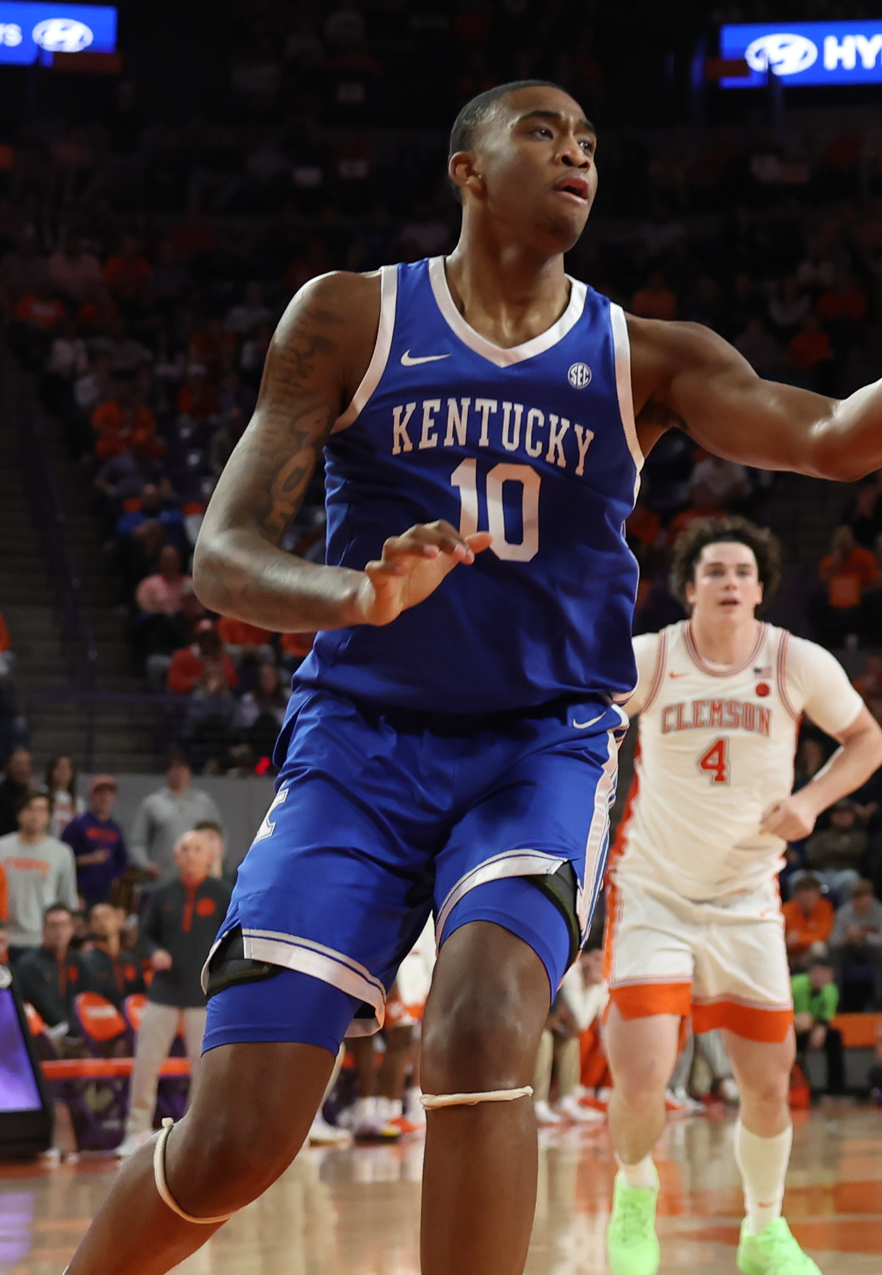
- Garrison with Kentucky in 2024

No. 9 – Alabama Crimson Tide
- Position: Power forward
- Conference: Southeastern Conference

Personal information
- Born: March 31, 2004 (age 22) Oklahoma City, Oklahoma, U.S.
- Listed height: 6 ft 10 in (2.08 m)
- Listed weight: 255 lb (116 kg)

Career information
- High school: Del City (Del City, Oklahoma)
- College: Oklahoma State (2023–2024); Kentucky (2024–2026); Alabama (2026–present)

Career highlights
- McDonald's All-American (2023); Jordan Brand Classic (2023)
Medals
Men's basketball
Representing the United States
FIBA Americas Under-18 Championship
Gold medal – first place	2022 Mexico	Team

Brandon M. Garrison (born March 31, 2004) is an American college basketball player for the Alabama Crimson Tide of the Southeastern Conference (SEC). He previously played for the Oklahoma State Cowboys and Kentucky Wildcats.

== Early life and high school career ==
Garrison was born and grew up in Oklahoma City and attended Del City High School in Del City, Oklahoma. Garrison was named the Oklahoma Gatorade player of the Year as a senior after averaging 15.7 points, 10 rebounds, and 2.9 assists per game as Del City won the state championship. He scored 17 points and grabbed 16 rebounds in the state title game against Carl Albert High School. Garrison was also selected to play in the 2023 McDonald's All-American Boys Game.

=== Recruiting ===
Garrison was rated a four-star recruit and one of the top players in the 2023 class, according to major recruiting services. On July 7, 2022, he committed to playing college basketball for Oklahoma State over offers from Kansas, Oklahoma, Arkansas, and Houston.

College recruiting
Name	Hometown	School	Height	Weight	Commit date
Brandon Garrison; C	Oklahoma City, OK	Del City (OK)	6 ft 10 in (2.08 m)	240 lb (110 kg)	Jul 7, 2022
Brandon Garrison; C	Recruit ratings: Rivals: 247Sports: On3: ESPN: (87)				
Overall recruit ranking: Rivals: 30 247Sports: 45 On3: 63 ESPN: 42
Note: In many cases, Scout, Rivals, 247Sports, On3, and ESPN may conflict in their listings of height and weight.; In these cases, the average was taken. ESPN grades are on a 100-point scale.; Sources: "Oklahoma State 2023 Basketball Commitments". Rivals.; "2023 Oklahoma State Cowboys Recruiting Class". ESPN.; "2023 Team Ranking". Rivals.

== College career ==
Garrison entered his freshman season at Oklahoma State as a reserve center. He became the Cowboys' starting center four games into the season. Garrison averaged 7.5 points, 5.3 rebounds, and 1.5 blocks per game during the season. After the end of the season and Oklahoma State's firing of head coach Mike Boynton, Garrison entered the NCAA transfer portal.

Garrison ultimately transferred to Kentucky. As a sophomor, Garrison averaged 5.9 points, 3.9 rebounds and 1.9 assists per game. He averaged 4.7 points and 4.1 rebounds per game as a junior. Following the season he transferred to Alabama.

== Career statistics ==
Legend
GP	Games played	GS	Games started	MPG	Minutes per game
FG%	Field goal percentage	3P%	3-point field goal percentage	FT%	Free throw percentage
RPG	Rebounds per game	APG	Assists per game	SPG	Steals per game
BPG	Blocks per game	PPG	Points per game	**Bold**	Career high

=== College ===
Year	Team	GP	GS	MPG	FG%	3P%	FT%	RPG	APG	SPG	BPG	PPG
2023–24	Oklahoma State	32	**29**	**22.7**	**.572**	—	**.648**	**5.3**	1.5	.8	**1.5**	**7.5**
2024–25	Kentucky	35	0	17.3	.509	**.300**	.535	3.9	**1.9**	**.9**	.6	5.9
2025–26	Kentucky	**36**	5	16.3	.556	.235	.591	4.1	1.1	.5	.8	4.7
Career		103	34	18.7	.545	.178	.591	4.4	1.5	.8	.9	6.0
