= Mouhamed Dioubate =

American basketball player (born 2003)

No. 10 – LSU Tigers
- Position: Small forward
- Conference: Southeastern Conference

Personal information
- Born: December 13, 2003 (age 22)
- Listed height: 6 ft 8 in (2.03 m)
- Listed weight: 235 lb (107 kg)

Career information
- High school: John Bowne (Queens, New York); Putnam Science Academy (Putnam, Connecticut)
- College: Alabama (2023–2025); Kentucky (2025–2026); LSU (2026–present)

Mouhamed Dioubate (born December 13, 2003) is an American college basketball player for the LSU Tigers of the Southeastern Conference (SEC). He previously played for the Alabama Crimson Tide and Kentucky Wildcats.

== Early life and high school ==
First, Dioubate started his high school career at John Bowne High School in Queens. Then Dioubate attended Putnam Science Academy in Putnam, Connecticut. He was rated as a four-star recruit and the 101st overall prospect in the class of 2023, where he held offers from schools such as Alabama, Maryland, Virginia Tech, Wake Forest, Kansas State, Ohio State, St. John's, Oklahoma, and Pittsburgh. Ultimately, Dioubate committed to play college basketball for the Alabama Crimson Tide.

== College career ==
On February 3, 2024, Dioubate posted 14 points and nine rebounds in a Crimson Tide win. In the second round of the 2024 NCAA Division I men's basketball tournament, he totaled nine points, five rebounds, and two blocks as he helped Alabama advance to the sweet sixteen with a win over Grand Canyon. In Dioubate's freshman season in 2023-24, he averaged 2.9 points and 2.4 rebounds in eight minutes per game. On November 26, 2024, he notched his first career double-double, posting ten points, 16 rebounds, three assist, a steal, and a block in an upset win over #5 Houston. On January 8, 2025, Dioubate tallied seven points, two rebounds, an assist, a block, and two steals in a win over South Carolina, after allowing just five points from Collin Murray-Boyles. On January 21, 2025, he scored a career-high 22 points in a win over Vanderbilt. On January 29, 2025, Dioubate posted four points, nine rebounds, two assists, a block and a steal in a win over Mississippi State. Following the season he transferred to Kentucky. Dioubate averaged 8.8 points and 5.5 rebounds per game. He transferred after the 2025-26 season to LSU.
