= Jasper Johnson =

American basketball player (born 2006)

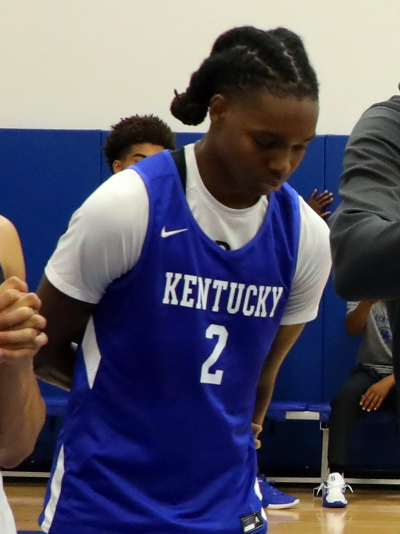
- Johnson with Kentucky in 2025

Oregon Ducks
- Position: Shooting guard / point guard
- Conference: Big Ten Conference

Personal information
- Born: March 25, 2006 (age 20) Lexington, Kentucky, U.S.
- Listed height: 6 ft 4 in (1.93 m)
- Listed weight: 170 lb (77 kg)

Career information
- High school: Woodford County (Versailles, Kentucky); Link Academy (Branson, Missouri); Overtime Elite Academy (Atlanta, Georgia)
- College: Kentucky (2025–2026); Oregon (2026–present)
Medals
Men's basketball
Representing the United States
FIBA U19 World Cup
Gold medal – first place	2025 Switzerland	Team
FIBA Under-18 AmeriCup
Gold medal – first place	2024 Argentina	Team

Jasper Johnson (born March 25, 2006) is an American college basketball player for the Oregon Ducks of the Big Ten Conference. He previously played for the Kentucky Wildcats.

== Early life ==
Johnson grew up in Lexington, Kentucky and initially attended Woodford County High School. He averaged 20.1 points per game as a sophomore. Johnson transferred to Link Academy in Branson, Missouri before the start of his junior year.

After his junior year, Johnson opted to leave Link Academy to join the Overtime Elite league as a non-professional player for team RWE in order to preserve his collegiate eligibility.

Johnson is a consensus top-25 recruit in the 2025 class, according to major recruiting services. He committed to play college basketball at Kentucky over offers from North Carolina, Alabama, Arkansas, and Louisville.

== National team career ==
Johnson played for the United States under-18 basketball team at the 2024 FIBA Under-18 AmeriCup. He averaged 10.0 points and 2.7 assists per game as the United States won the gold medal.

== Personal life ==
Johnson's father, Dennis Johnson, played college football at Kentucky and in the National Football League for the Arizona Cardinals and San Francisco 49ers. His uncle Derrick also played football at Kentucky. Johnson's grandfather, Alvis Johnson, played football at Western Kentucky and was the head football and track coach at Harrodsburg High School before serving as an assistant athletic director at Kentucky.
