= Denzel Aberdeen =

American basketball player (born 2003)

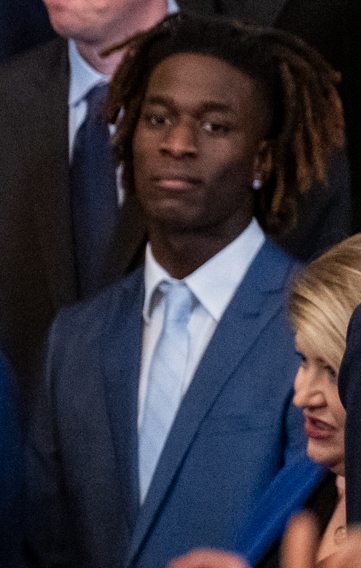
- Aberdeen in 2025

No. 1 – Florida Gators
- Position: Point guard / shooting guard
- Conference: Southeastern Conference

Personal information
- Born: December 26, 2003 (age 22)
- Listed height: 6 ft 5 in (1.96 m)
- Listed weight: 190 lb (86 kg)

Career information
- High school: Dr. Phillips (Orlando, Florida)
- College: Florida (2022–2025); Kentucky (2025–2026); Florida (2026–present)

Career highlights
- NCAA champion (2025)

Denzel Aberdeen (born December 26, 2003) is an American college basketball player for the Florida Gators of the Southeastern Conference (SEC). He previously played for the Kentucky Wildcats.

== Early life ==
Aberdeen attended Dr. Phillips High School in Orlando, Florida, and received offers from schools such as Oklahoma, Texas Tech, Georgia Tech, Florida, Stetson, Florida Gulf Coast, Louisiana Lafayette, Ole Miss, Iona, Virginia Tech and Minnesota. Aberdeen was rated as a three-star recruit and committed to play college basketball for the Florida Gators.

== College career ==
=== Florida (2022-2025) ===
As a freshman in 2022–23, Aberdeen averaged 1.6 points in 12 games. On November 14, 2023, he totaled 12 points and four rebounds in a victory over Florida A&M. On January 10, 2024, Aberdeen recorded seven points versus Ole Miss. In the semifinals of the 2024 SEC men's basketball tournament, he recorded 20 points and four steals in a comeback win over Texas A&M. Aberdeen finished the 2023–24 season, appearing in 32 games where he averaged 3.3 points per game. On February 11, 2025, he scored 20 points in a win against Mississippi State. On February 15, Aberdeen notched a career-high 22 points in a victory versus South Carolina. On April 18, 2025, Denzel Aberdeen announced that he would enter the transfer portal.

=== Kentucky (2025-2026) ===
On April 21, 2025, Aberdeen announced his transfer commitment to Kentucky. On April 7, 2026, Denzel Aberdeen announced that he would enter the transfer portal.

=== Return to Florida (2026-Present) ===
On April 10, 2026, Aberdeen announced his transfer commitment to Florida.

== Personal life ==
Aberdeen is the son of Ian and Denyse Aberdeen. He has five siblings.
