= 2025–26 Phoenix Suns season =

- Head coach: Jordan Ott
- General manager: Brian Gregory
- Owner(s): Mat Ishbia & Justin Ishbia
- Arena: Mortgage Matchup Center

Results
- Record: 45–37 (.549)
- Place: Division: 2nd (Pacific); Conference: 7th (Western)
- Playoff finish: First round (lost to Thunder 0–4)
- Stats at Basketball Reference

Local media
- Television: Arizona's Family Sports (Note: KTVK, KPHO-TV, KOLD-TV, KPHE-LD, KAZF, KAZS); FuboTV (Note: Albuquerque, New Mexico); Kiswe (Suns Live)
- Radio: KTAR

The 2025–26 Phoenix Suns season was the 58th season of the franchise in the National Basketball Association (NBA), as well as their 33rd season at the Mortgage Matchup Center. It is also their third full season under the ownership group led by Mat Ishbia and Justin Ishbia after the brothers purchased the team on February 8, 2023. This is the first time since the 2021–22 season that the Suns did not play on Christmas Day.

On April 14, 2025, just a day after their disappointing season ended, the Suns fired head coach, Mike Budenholzer after only one year with the team, despite his five-year, $50 million contract. This decision was made after the team's poor performance that previous season. On May 1, the Suns promoted Brian Gregory, formerly the vice president of player programming and veteran college basketball coach, to general manager. James Jones transitioned to a senior advisor role before being appointed as the NBA's Executive Vice President and Head of Basketball Operations on July 9, succeeding Joe Dumars. On June 6, Phoenix hired Cleveland Cavaliers assistant coach Jordan Ott as head coach, signing him to a four-year contract. On July 6, the Suns completed a record-breaking seven-team trade that sent Kevin Durant to the Houston Rockets and brought in Jalen Green, Dillon Brooks, the 10th overall pick in the 2025 NBA draft, Khaman Maluach, Rasheer Fleming, Koby Brea, and future second-round picks in 2026 and 2032 from Houston. On July 16, the Suns and Bradley Beal reached an agreement on a contract buyout, with the team applying the stretch provision to his remaining $90 million guaranteed salary.

Despite trading away Kevin Durant and waiving Bradley Beal (which led to many predictions on the team performing poorly this season), the Suns would end up exceeding these lower expectations held upon them this season. The Suns also qualified as a wildcard in the 2025 NBA Cup, clinching the spot over the Memphis Grizzlies via a higher point differential after both teams placed second in their respective groups with identical 3–1 group stage record, but were eliminated by the Oklahoma City Thunder in the Cup quarterfinals. With a 129–114 road victory on March 10, 2026 against the Milwaukee Bucks, Phoenix would exceed the win total they had from their previous season. Weeks later, on March 30, a 131–105 blowout victory over the Memphis Grizzlies on the road would see the Suns have an above-average season for the fourth time in the past five seasons. However, due in part to serious injury issues that happened back in February up until the end of the season, the Suns failed to avoid participating in the Play-In Tournament for this season despite their 45–37 for what could normally be considered a 7th place finish in the Western Conference.

Although they lost to the 8th-placed Portland Trail Blazers in the first stage of the play-in tournament, the Suns clinched a playoff berth for the first time since 2024 by defeating the Golden State Warriors in the elimination game of the NBA play-in tournament on April 17. They qualified as the 8th seed, but were swept by the defending champion top-seeded Oklahoma City Thunder, who did so in the same round for the third consecutive season.

== Offseason ==
=== Coaching staff changes ===
One day after the conclusion of the Suns' disappointing season, on April 14, head coach Mike Budenholzer was fired despite having four years and approximately $40 million remaining on his contract. His dismissal mirrored that of his predecessor, Frank Vogel, as the organization cited the team's underperformance as a primary factor, particularly given expectations that the roster was capable of a significantly better record than the 36 wins achieved that season. The Suns opted for a more deliberate head coaching search with an emphasis on finding a coach who could better connect with players and guide a developing roster. The team reportedly considered up to 20 candidates during the offseason, including former head coach Mike Brown, New Orleans Pelicans head coach Willie Green, and Cleveland Cavaliers assistants Johnnie Bryant and Jordan Ott. The Suns announced on June 6 that Jordan Ott had been named head coach. Ott signed a four-year contract and received endorsements from Suns legends Devin Booker and Steve Nash, the latter of whom previously worked with Ott during their time with the Brooklyn Nets.

On June 11, that former NBA player and Cleveland Cavaliers assistant coach DeMarre Carroll would become the first assistant to join Jordan Ott's new coaching staff. Carroll was later confirmed to coach the Suns' 2025 NBA Summer League team. On July 8, the Suns announced that Washington Wizards assistant coach Brian Randle would return as an assistant coach after previously serving under Monty Williams from 2020 to 2023, including during the team's run to the 2021 NBA Finals. The team also confirmed that Chaisson Allen would remain on the staff. Two days later, assistant coaches Brent Barry and James Posey departed the team. Barry joined Amazon Prime Video's NBA broadcast team, while Posey became an assistant coach for the Portland Trail Blazers. The Suns hired Orlando Magic assistant Jesse Mermuys as offensive coordinator, and former NBA player Mateen Cleaves—Ishbia's former Michigan State teammate and United Wholesale Mortgage employee—as player development coach. On July 19, Valley Suns head coach John Little was added to Ott's staff as an assistant coach. On August 9, former NBA player Mike Muscala joined the Suns' coaching staff as an assistant coach. On August 13, the Suns announced that former Charlotte Hornets head coach and front office advisor Steve Clifford had been hired as a coaching advisor.

=== Front office changes ===
In an interview, Suns owner Mat Ishbia revealed that organizational changes to the front office would take place during the offseason, describing them as the most significant adjustments to be made before addressing the head coaching position. In early April, reports surfaced that the Suns were exploring the possibility of hiring former Golden State Warriors general manager Bob Myers to be their general manager. However, on May 1, the team announced that Brian Gregory—formerly a college basketball head coach and the Suns' vice president of player programming—had been promoted to general manager. James Jones, who previously served as general manager and team president, transitioned to a senior advisor role for the remainder of his contract, which expired at the start of free agency, before being appointed as the NBA's Executive Vice President and Head of Basketball Operations on July 9, succeeding Joe Dumars. Additionally, the Suns promoted director of scouting Oronde Taliaferro to assistant general manager and expanded chief innovation officer Paul Rivers' responsibilities to include basketball operations. On September 22, it was announced that Steve Nash would return to the Suns as a senior advisor, with him also slated to join his planned position for Amazon Prime Video's own NBA TV-based program on their streaming service in the process (with him retaining his position with Amazon Prime for this season while doing pre-game work there). Finally, on October 4, the Suns would hire former Detroit Pistons senior advisor Ed Stefanski to be their new front office advisor to go alongside Steve Nash.

=== Draft picks ===
| Round | Pick | Player | Position | Nationality | College / Club |
|---|---|---|---|---|---|
| 1 | 10 | Khaman Maluach | Center | South Sudan | Duke |
| 2 | 31 | Rasheer Fleming | Power Forward | United States | Saint Joseph's |
| 2 | 41 | Koby Brea | Shooting Guard | United States; Dominican Republic | Kentucky |

The Suns entered the draft holding one first-round and one second-round selection, though neither was originally their own. The first-round pick, which became the 29th overall pick, was acquired from the Cleveland Cavaliers through a previous trade with the Utah Jazz. The second-round pick, 52nd overall, was also obtained via trade during the previous season. The Suns acquired it, along with Nick Richards, from the Charlotte Hornets in exchange for Josh Okogie and three second-round picks. The selection originally belonged to the Denver Nuggets.

Phoenix's original first-round pick (No. 10 overall) had been dealt to the Brooklyn Nets as part of the trade for Kevin Durant. The Suns' own second-round pick (No. 40 overall) was included in the earlier trade with the Washington Wizards for Bradley Beal. However, on June 22, it was announced that following Durant's impending trade to the Houston Rockets—which became official on July 6 after Jalen Green's rookie extension and later expanded into a record-breaking seven-team deal—the Suns would regain their first-round pick initially lost in the Durant trade. Phoenix was also slated to acquire the final selection of the draft from the Oklahoma City Thunder, in addition to second-round picks in 2025, 2026, and 2032. The 59th pick, originally held by Houston before being traded to Phoenix, became the final selection of the draft after the New York Knicks forfeited their second-round pick due to a free agency violation.

In the first round of the 2025 NBA draft, the Rockets selected South Sudanese center Khaman Maluach from Duke University on behalf of the Suns. Maluach had been named to the 2025 All-Atlantic Coast Conference (ACC) Freshman Team after helping Duke reach the Final Four of the 2025 NCAA Division I men's basketball tournament. Before his collegiate career, he played professionally for multiple teams in the Basketball Africa League, where he led the league in rebounds in his final season in the league. Phoenix also sent the 29th overall pick, a 2029 first-round pick acquired from the Utah Jazz, and Serbian guard Vasilije Micić to the Charlotte Hornets. In return, the Suns received Mark Williams and reacquired their own 2029 second-round pick.

In the second round of the draft, Phoenix executed several additional trades involving their second-round selections. The Suns initially held the rights to the 36th, 52nd, and 59th overall picks. The Suns ultimately acquired the 31st and 41st overall selections. With the 31st pick, the Minnesota Timberwolvess selected forward Rasheer Fleming from Saint Joseph's University for the Suns, while the Golden State Warriors used the 41st pick to select Dominican-American guard Koby Brea from the University of Kentucky for Phoenix. Fleming had been named to the 2025 All-Atlantic 10 First Team, while Brea was a two-time Atlantic 10 Sixth Man of the Year in 2022 and 2024 and led the conference in three-point shooting in his final seasons at Dayton and Kentucky.

=== Trades and Free agency ===
Ahead of the 2025–26 NBA season, the Phoenix Suns sought to move on from Bradley Beal's remaining two years under contract and explored trade options involving Kevin Durant as part of a broader effort to restructure the roster following two disappointing seasons from their “superteam” experiment centered around Devin Booker. On June 22, it was announced that a deal involving Durant would become official on July 6. The transaction ultimately materialized as a record-breaking seven-team trade that sent Durant to the Houston Rockets in exchange for Jalen Green, Dillon Brooks, the return of the Suns' own first-round pick, multiple second-round draft selections (including two in the 2025 draft, one in 2026, and a conditional pick in 2032), and Daeqwon Plowden from the Atlanta Hawks, who was later waived following completion of the deal.

The Suns reportedly explored offseason trade scenarios involving Grayson Allen and Royce O'Neale, with Nick Richards later mentioned as a possible trade candidate after the 2025 NBA draft, reinforcing speculation that the team was preparing for a major roster overhaul. The team also faced key contract decisions on Richards, Martin, and Micić, whose 2025–26 season was held as a team option stemming from his 2023–24 deal with the Oklahoma City Thunder. Prior to the draft, Phoenix exercised Micić's option and subsequently agreed to trade him, along with the 29th overall pick and a 2029 first-round pick acquired from the Jazz to the Hornets in exchange for Mark Williams and the Suns' own 2029 second-round pick. Richards' 2025–26 contract was fully guaranteed by his June 29 deadline, while Martin was waived the following day. Additionally, Bol Bol, Tyus Jones, Damion Lee, Monté Morris, and Mason Plumlee became unrestricted free agents, while two-way players Collin Gillespie, Jalen Bridges, and TyTy Washington Jr. entered restricted free agency as of June 30.

At the start of the 2025 free agency, the Suns agreed to sign Collin Gillespie to a one-year veteran's minimum contract. Phoenix also reached an agreement with Nigel Hayes-Davis of Fenerbahçe Beko in Turkey's Basketbol Süper Ligi on a one-year deal for his return to the NBA at age 30. On July 3, undrafted forward C. J. Huntley from Appalachian State University signed a two-year two-way contract with the Suns. On July 8, the Suns signed Isaiah Livers to a two-way contract, joining rookies Huntley and Koby Brea.

On July 16, the Suns waived Bradley Beal and used the stretch provision on his contract, which still had two years remaining, officially ending the 'Big Three' era in Phoenix. The remaining $110.8 million on Beal's deal was stretched over five years (starting with this season), with Beal forfeiting $13.9 million in order to make it happen, thus resulting in approximately $20 million in dead cap space on an annual basis. The move allowed Phoenix to fall below both the new second tax apron and the original tax apron. On July 23, the Suns reacquired Jordan Goodwin after claiming him off waivers from the Los Angeles Lakers and also signed Jared Butler on a one-year contract, though he was waived after the preseason period.

== Roster ==
2025–26 Phoenix Suns roster
Players

| Pos. | No. | Player | Height | Weight | DOB | From |
|---|---|---|---|---|---|---|
| G | 8 | Grayson Allen | 6 ft 3 in (1.91 m) | 198 lb (90 kg) | October 8, 1995 | Duke |
| G | 1 | Devin Booker | 6 ft 5 in (1.96 m) | 206 lb (93 kg) | October 30, 1996 | Kentucky |
| G | 17 | Jamaree Bouyea | 6 ft 2 in (1.88 m) | 180 lb (82 kg) | June 27, 1999 | San Francisco |
| G | 14 | Koby Brea (TW) | 6 ft 5 in (1.96 m) | 215 lb (98 kg) | November 6, 2002 | Kentucky |
| G/F | 3 | Dillon Brooks | 6 ft 7 in (2.01 m) | 225 lb (102 kg) | January 22, 1996 | Oregon |
| G/F | 2 | Amir Coffey | 6 ft 7 in (2.01 m) | 210 lb (95 kg) | June 17, 1997 | Minnesota |
| F | 0 | Ryan Dunn | 6 ft 7 in (2.01 m) | 216 lb (98 kg) | January 7, 2003 | Virginia |
| F | 20 | Rasheer Fleming (GL) | 6 ft 9 in (2.06 m) | 240 lb (109 kg) | July 10, 2004 | Saint Joseph's |
| G | 12 | Collin Gillespie | 6 ft 1 in (1.85 m) | 195 lb (88 kg) | June 25, 1999 | Villanova |
| G | 23 | Jordan Goodwin (injured) | 6 ft 3 in (1.91 m) | 215 lb (98 kg) | October 23, 1998 | Saint Louis |
| G | 4 | Jalen Green | 6 ft 4 in (1.93 m) | 186 lb (84 kg) | February 9, 2002 | Prolific Prep (CA) |
| F | 19 | Haywood Highsmith | 6 ft 5 in (1.96 m) | 220 lb (100 kg) | December 9, 1996 | Wheeling |
| F | 22 | C. J. Huntley (TW) | 6 ft 11 in (2.11 m) | 230 lb (104 kg) | January 6, 2002 | Appalachian State |
| F | 11 | Oso Ighodaro | 6 ft 11 in (2.11 m) | 235 lb (107 kg) | July 14, 2002 | Marquette |
| F | 18 | Isaiah Livers (TW) | 6 ft 6 in (1.98 m) | 232 lb (105 kg) | July 28, 1998 | Michigan |
| C | 10 | Khaman Maluach (GL) | 7 ft 1 in (2.16 m) | 250 lb (113 kg) | September 14, 2006 | Duke |
| F | 00 | Royce O'Neale | 6 ft 6 in (1.98 m) | 226 lb (103 kg) | June 5, 1993 | Baylor |
| C | 15 | Mark Williams | 7 ft 1 in (2.16 m) | 240 lb (109 kg) | December 16, 2001 | Duke |

Coaches
Head coach
- Jordan Ott
Assistant(s)
- Chaisson Allen
- DeMarre Carroll
- Sean Dwyer
- John Little
- Jesse Mermuys
- Mike Muscala
- Brian Randle

Legend
- (DP) Unsigned draft pick
- (FA) Free agent
- (S) Suspended
- (GL) On assignment to G League affiliate
- (TW) Two-way affiliate player
- Injured

Roster
Updated: February 21, 2026

== Standings ==
=== Division ===
| Pacific Division | W | L | PCT | GB | Home | Road | Div | GP |
|---|---|---|---|---|---|---|---|---|
| y – Los Angeles Lakers | 53 | 29 | .646 | – | 28‍–‍13 | 25‍–‍16 | 9‍–‍7 | 82 |
| x – Phoenix Suns | 45 | 37 | .549 | 8.0 | 25‍–‍16 | 20‍–‍21 | 10‍–‍6 | 82 |
| pi – Los Angeles Clippers | 42 | 40 | .512 | 11.0 | 23‍–‍18 | 19‍–‍22 | 10‍–‍6 | 82 |
| pi – Golden State Warriors | 37 | 45 | .451 | 16.0 | 22‍–‍19 | 15‍–‍26 | 7‍–‍9 | 82 |
| Sacramento Kings | 22 | 60 | .268 | 31.0 | 15‍–‍26 | 7‍–‍34 | 4‍–‍12 | 82 |

=== Conference ===
Western Conference
| # | Team | W | L | PCT | GB | GP |
|---|---|---|---|---|---|---|
| 1 | z – Oklahoma City Thunder * | 64 | 18 | .780 | – | 82 |
| 2 | y – San Antonio Spurs * | 62 | 20 | .756 | 2.0 | 82 |
| 3 | x – Denver Nuggets | 54 | 28 | .659 | 10.0 | 82 |
| 4 | y – Los Angeles Lakers * | 53 | 29 | .646 | 11.0 | 82 |
| 5 | x – Houston Rockets | 52 | 30 | .634 | 12.0 | 82 |
| 6 | x – Minnesota Timberwolves | 49 | 33 | .598 | 15.0 | 82 |
| 7 | x – Phoenix Suns | 45 | 37 | .549 | 19.0 | 82 |
| 8 | x – Portland Trail Blazers | 42 | 40 | .512 | 22.0 | 82 |
| 9 | pi – Los Angeles Clippers | 42 | 40 | .512 | 22.0 | 82 |
| 10 | pi – Golden State Warriors | 37 | 45 | .451 | 27.0 | 82 |
| 11 | New Orleans Pelicans | 26 | 56 | .317 | 38.0 | 82 |
| 12 | Dallas Mavericks | 26 | 56 | .317 | 38.0 | 82 |
| 13 | Memphis Grizzlies | 25 | 57 | .305 | 39.0 | 82 |
| 14 | Sacramento Kings | 22 | 60 | .268 | 42.0 | 82 |
| 15 | Utah Jazz | 22 | 60 | .268 | 42.0 | 82 |

== Game log ==
=== Preseason ===
During the previous season, it was announced that the Suns and Brooklyn Nets would play two of their preseason games at the Venetian Arena in Macau, with the Suns being named the home team in those games. These games would represent a return to mainland China for the NBA itself for the first time since the 2019 preseason period back when the Nets played against the Los Angeles Lakers before China boycotted the NBA for a few seasons due to comments that Daryl Morey (the Houston Rockets' general manager at the time) made involving the nation regarding the 2019–2020 Hong Kong protests at the time. In addition to that, in early June 2025, the Lakers announced that their first preseason game would be at the Acrisure Arena against the Suns on October 3. The Suns' final preseason game, which would also be against the Lakers, though it would be on October 14 at the Mortgage Matchup Center for three home preseason games to close out the preseason, would officially be announced on July 30, 2025.

2025 preseason game log
Total: 3–1 (Home: 1–1; Road: 2–0)
Preseason: 3–1 (home: 1–1; road: 2–0)

| Game | Date | Team | Score | High points | High rebounds | High assists | Location Attendance | Record |
|---|---|---|---|---|---|---|---|---|
| 1 | October 3 | @ L.A. Lakers | W 103–81 | Devin Booker (24) | Oso Ighodaro (9) | Devin Booker (7) | Acrisure Arena; 9,122 | 1–0 |
| 2 | October 10 | @ Brooklyn | W 132–127 (OT) | Jordan Goodwin (19) | Collin Gillespie (9) | Royce O'Neale (6) | (Macau) Venetian Arena; 11,317 | 2–0 |
| 3 | October 12 | Brooklyn | L 109–111 | Devin Booker (18) | Booker, Dunn, Ighodaro, Richards (5) | Devin Booker (5) | (Macau) Venetian Arena; 11,729 | 2–1 |
| 4 | October 14 | L.A. Lakers | W 113–104 | Jared Butler (35) | Khaman Maluach (8) | Jared Butler (9) | Mortgage Matchup Center; 17,071 | 3–1 |

2025–26 preseason schedule

=== Regular season ===
Before the NBA announced the regular season schedule for every team in the league, it was confirmed on August 13 that the Suns would start out this season at home on October 22 against the Sacramento Kings.

2025–26 game log
Total: 45–37 (Home: 25–16; Road: 20–21)
October: 2–4 (home: 2–1; road: 0–3)

| Game | Date | Team | Score | High points | High rebounds | High assists | Location Attendance | Record |
|---|---|---|---|---|---|---|---|---|
| 1 | October 22 | Sacramento | W 120–116 | Devin Booker (31) | Mark Williams (11) | Grayson Allen (7) | Mortgage Matchup Center; 17,071 | 1–0 |
| 2 | October 24 | @ L.A. Clippers | L 102–129 | Dillon Brooks (21) | Ighodaro, Williams (6) | Devin Booker (7) | Intuit Dome; 17,927 | 1–1 |
| 3 | October 25 | @ Denver | L 111–133 | Devin Booker (31) | Ryan Dunn (7) | Devin Booker (7) | Ball Arena; 20,025 | 1–2 |
| 4 | October 27 | @ Utah | L 134–138 (OT) | Devin Booker (34) | Royce O'Neale (13) | Collin Gillespie (12) | Delta Center; 18,186 | 1–3 |
| 5 | October 29 | Memphis | L 113–114 | Devin Booker (32) | Mark Williams (12) | Gillespie, O'Neale (5) | Mortgage Matchup Center; 17,071 | 1–4 |
| 6 | October 31 | Utah | W 118–96 | Devin Booker (36) | Ryan Dunn (10) | Devin Booker (9) | Mortgage Matchup Center; 17,071 | 2–4 |

November: 10–5 (home: 6–3; road: 4–2)

| Game | Date | Team | Score | High points | High rebounds | High assists | Location Attendance | Record |
|---|---|---|---|---|---|---|---|---|
| 7 | November 2 | San Antonio | W 130–112 | Devin Booker (28) | Mark Williams (7) | Devin Booker (13) | Mortgage Matchup Center; 17,071 | 3–4 |
| 8 | November 4 | @ Golden State | L 107–118 | Devin Booker (38) | Mark Williams (16) | Grayson Allen (5) | Chase Center; 18,064 | 3–5 |
| 9 | November 6 | L.A. Clippers | W 115–102 | Jalen Green (29) | Mark Williams (10) | Booker, Gillespie (7) | Mortgage Matchup Center; 17,071 | 4–5 |
| 10 | November 8 | @ L.A. Clippers | W 114–103 | Devin Booker (21) | Devin Booker (10) | Devin Booker (9) | Intuit Dome; 17,927 | 5–5 |
| 11 | November 10 | New Orleans | W 121–98 | Grayson Allen (42) | Mark Williams (6) | Collin Gillespie (5) | Mortgage Matchup Center; 17,071 | 6–5 |
| 12 | November 12 | @ Dallas | W 123–114 | Devin Booker (26) | Nick Richards (7) | Devin Booker (9) | American Airlines Center; 19,501 | 7–5 |
| 13 | November 13 | Indiana | W 133–98 | Devin Booker (33) | Jordan Goodwin (10) | Devin Booker (7) | Mortgage Matchup Center; 17,071 | 8–5 |
| 14 | November 16 | Atlanta | L 122–124 | Dillon Brooks (34) | Collin Gillespie (9) | Collin Gillespie (8) | Mortgage Matchup Center; 17,071 | 8–6 |
| 15 | November 18 | @ Portland | W 127–110 | Booker, Gillespie (19) | Booker, Williams (6) | Collin Gillespie (6) | Moda Center; 17,051 | 9–6 |
| 16 | November 21 | Minnesota | W 114–113 | Dillon Brooks (22) | Mark Williams (8) | Devin Booker (10) | Mortgage Matchup Center; 17,071 | 10–6 |
| 17 | November 23 | San Antonio | W 111–102 | Dillon Brooks (25) | Mark Williams (11) | Devin Booker (7) | Mortgage Matchup Center; 17,071 | 11–6 |
| 18 | November 24 | Houston | L 92–114 | Dillon Brooks (29) | Nick Richards (11) | Devin Booker (5) | Mortgage Matchup Center; 17,071 | 11–7 |
| 19 | November 26 | @ Sacramento | W 112–100 | Gillespie, Williams (21) | Mark Williams (16) | Collin Gillespie (9) | Golden 1 Center; 17,961 | 12–7 |
| 20 | November 28 | @ Oklahoma City | L 119–123 | Collin Gillespie (24) | Mark Williams (14) | Devin Booker (6) | Paycom Center; 18,203 | 12–8 |
| 21 | November 29 | Denver | L 112–130 | Dillon Brooks (27) | Oso Ighodaro (8) | Devin Booker (7) | Mortgage Matchup Center; 17,071 | 12–9 |

December: 7–5 (home: 2–1; road: 5–4)

| Game | Date | Team | Score | High points | High rebounds | High assists | Location Attendance | Record |
|---|---|---|---|---|---|---|---|---|
| 22 | December 1 | @ L.A. Lakers | W 125–108 | Dillon Brooks (33) | Ryan Dunn (8) | Royce O'Neale (11) | Crypto.com Arena; 18,997 | 13–9 |
| 23 | December 5 | @ Houston | L 98–117 | Dillon Brooks (23) | Jordan Goodwin (5) | Dillon Brooks (4) | Toyota Center; 18,055 | 13–10 |
| 24 | December 8 | @ Minnesota | W 108–105 | Mark Williams (22) | Dunn, O'Neale (8) | Royce O'Neale (5) | Target Center; 16,046 | 14–10 |
| 25 | December 10 | @ Oklahoma City | L 89–138 | Dillon Brooks (16) | Ighodaro, Richards, Williams (5) | Jamaree Bouyea (5) | Paycom Center; 18,203 | 14–11 |
| 26 | December 14 | L.A. Lakers | L 114–116 | Devin Booker (27) | Booker, Williams (6) | Allen, Booker (7) | Mortgage Matchup Center; 17,071 | 14–12 |
| 27 | December 18 | Golden State | W 99–98 | Devin Booker (25) | Oso Ighodaro (13) | Collin Gillespie (5) | Mortgage Matchup Center; 17,071 | 15–12 |
| 28 | December 20 | @ Golden State | L 116–119 | Devin Booker (38) | Oso Ighodaro (8) | Devin Booker (5) | Chase Center; 18,064 | 15–13 |
| 29 | December 23 | L.A. Lakers | W 132–108 | Dillon Brooks (25) | Mark Williams (9) | Devin Booker (11) | Mortgage Matchup Center; 17,071 | 16–13 |
| 30 | December 26 | @ New Orleans | W 115–108 | Devin Booker (30) | Mark Williams (13) | Collin Gillespie (9) | Smoothie King Center; 16,643 | 17–13 |
| 31 | December 27 | @ New Orleans | W 123–114 | Devin Booker (20) | Oso Ighodaro (10) | Collin Gillespie (7) | Smoothie King Center; 16,914 | 18–13 |
| 32 | December 29 | @ Washington | W 115–101 | Dillon Brooks (26) | Oso Ighodaro (10) | Collin Gillespie (6) | Capital One Arena; 16,982 | 19–13 |
| 33 | December 31 | @ Cleveland | L 113–129 | Devin Booker (32) | Jordan Goodwin (15) | Collin Gillespie (5) | Rocket Arena; 19,432 | 19–14 |

January: 11–5 (home: 7–1; road: 4–4)

| Game | Date | Team | Score | High points | High rebounds | High assists | Location Attendance | Record |
|---|---|---|---|---|---|---|---|---|
| 34 | January 2 | Sacramento | W 129–102 | Devin Booker (33) | Mark Williams (9) | Jordan Goodwin (6) | Mortgage Matchup Center; 17,071 | 20–14 |
| 35 | January 4 | Oklahoma City | W 108–105 | Jordan Goodwin (26) | Dunn, Ighodaro (8) | Devin Booker (9) | Mortgage Matchup Center; 17,071 | 21–14 |
| 36 | January 5 | @ Houston | L 97–100 | Devin Booker (27) | Ighodaro, Williams (8) | Grayson Allen (6) | Toyota Center; 18,055 | 21–15 |
| 37 | January 7 | @ Memphis | W 117–98 | Dillon Brooks (21) | Mark Williams (12) | Devin Booker (8) | FedExForum; 14,268 | 22–15 |
| 38 | January 9 | New York | W 112–107 | Devin Booker (31) | Dillon Brooks (7) | Devin Booker (8) | Mortgage Matchup Center; 17,071 | 23–15 |
| 39 | January 11 | Washington | W 112–93 | Royce O'Neale (19) | Tied (7) | Devin Booker (8) | Mortgage Matchup Center; 17,071 | 24–15 |
| 40 | January 13 | @ Miami | L 121–127 | Allen, Brooks (25) | Mark Williams (14) | Devin Booker (9) | Kaseya Center; 19,700 | 24–16 |
| 41 | January 15 | @ Detroit | L 105–108 | Grayson Allen (33) | Jordan Goodwin (12) | Royce O'Neale (7) | Little Caesars Arena; 19,199 | 24–17 |
| 42 | January 17 | @ New York | W 106–99 | Devin Booker (27) | Mark Williams (9) | Collin Gillespie (6) | Madison Square Garden; 19,812 | 25–17 |
| 43 | January 19 | @ Brooklyn | W 126–117 | Dillon Brooks (27) | Mark Williams (8) | Grayson Allen (8) | Barclays Center; 17,344 | 26–17 |
| 44 | January 20 | @ Philadelphia | W 116–110 | Devin Booker (27) | Mark Williams (9) | Grayson Allen (6) | Xfinity Mobile Arena; 17,839 | 27–17 |
| 45 | January 23 | @ Atlanta | L 103–110 | Devin Booker (31) | Oso Ighodaro (7) | Jordan Goodwin (5) | State Farm Arena; 15,461 | 27–18 |
| 46 | January 25 | Miami | L 102–111 | Dillon Brooks (26) | Mark Williams (8) | Royce O'Neale (5) | Mortgage Matchup Center; 17,071 | 27–19 |
| 47 | January 27 | Brooklyn | W 106–102 | Mark Williams (27) | Jordan Goodwin (9) | Grayson Allen (6) | Mortgage Matchup Center; 17,071 | 28–19 |
| 48 | January 29 | Detroit | W 114–96 | Dillon Brooks (40) | Oso Ighodaro (9) | Grayson Allen (5) | Mortgage Matchup Center; 17,071 | 29–19 |
| 49 | January 30 | Cleveland | W 126–113 | Dillon Brooks (27) | Mark Williams (7) | Tied (5) | Mortgage Matchup Center; 17,071 | 30–19 |

February: 4–7 (home: 3–6; road: 1–1)

| Game | Date | Team | Score | High points | High rebounds | High assists | Location Attendance | Record |
|---|---|---|---|---|---|---|---|---|
| 50 | February 1 | L.A. Clippers | L 93–117 | Grayson Allen (23) | Mark Williams (7) | Grayson Allen (8) | Mortgage Matchup Center; 17,071 | 30–20 |
| 51 | February 3 | @ Portland | W 130–125 | Collin Gillespie (30) | Mark Williams (11) | Collin Gillespie (10) | Moda Center; 16,092 | 31–20 |
| 52 | February 5 | Golden State | L 97–101 | Dillon Brooks (24) | Mark Williams (10) | Royce O'Neale (5) | Mortgage Matchup Center; 17,071 | 31–21 |
| 53 | February 7 | Philadelphia | L 103–109 | Dillon Brooks (28) | O'Neale, Williams (11) | Devin Booker (9) | Mortgage Matchup Center; 17,071 | 31–22 |
| 54 | February 10 | Dallas | W 120–111 | Dillon Brooks (23) | Oso Ighodaro (10) | Collin Gillespie (8) | Mortgage Matchup Center; 17,071 | 32–22 |
| 55 | February 11 | Oklahoma City | L 109–132 | Dillon Brooks (23) | Khaman Maluach (6) | Jamaree Bouyea (6) | Mortgage Matchup Center; 17,071 | 32–23 |
All-Star Game
| 56 | February 19 | @ San Antonio | L 94–121 | Jalen Green (26) | Mark Williams (10) | Collin Gillespie (8) | Moody Center; 16,258 | 32–24 |
| 57 | February 21 | Orlando | W 113–110 (2OT) | Grayson Allen (27) | Oso Ighodaro (12) | Collin Gillespie (6) | Mortgage Matchup Center; 17,071 | 33–24 |
| 58 | February 22 | Portland | L 77–92 | Collin Gillespie (18) | Maluach, O'Neale (7) | Amir Coffey (4) | Mortgage Matchup Center; 17,071 | 33–25 |
| 59 | February 24 | Boston | L 81–97 | Collin Gillespie (15) | Ryan Dunn (6) | Oso Ighodaro (5) | Mortgage Matchup Center; 17,071 | 33–26 |
| 60 | February 26 | L.A. Lakers | W 113–110 | Grayson Allen (28) | Mark Williams (10) | Grayson Allen (6) | Mortgage Matchup Center; 17,071 | 34–26 |

March: 8–8 (home: 4–3; road: 4–5)

| Game | Date | Team | Score | High points | High rebounds | High assists | Location Attendance | Record |
|---|---|---|---|---|---|---|---|---|
| 61 | March 3 | @ Sacramento | W 114–103 | Jalen Green (20) | Oso Ighodaro (14) | Collin Gillespie (9) | Golden 1 Center; 15,009 | 35–26 |
| 62 | March 5 | Chicago | L 103–105 | Devin Booker (27) | Ryan Dunn (11) | Grayson Allen (8) | Mortgage Matchup Center; 17,071 | 35–27 |
| 63 | March 6 | New Orleans | W 118–116 | Devin Booker (32) | Tied (6) | Grayson Allen (8) | Mortgage Matchup Center; 17,071 | 36–27 |
| 64 | March 8 | Charlotte | W 111–99 | Devin Booker (30) | Khaman Maluach (9) | Devin Booker (10) | Mortgage Matchup Center; 17,071 | 37–27 |
| 65 | March 10 | @ Milwaukee | W 129–114 | Devin Booker (27) | Collin Gillespie (9) | Collin Gillespie (9) | Fiserv Forum; 15,300 | 38–27 |
| 66 | March 12 | @ Indiana | W 123–108 | Devin Booker (43) | Booker, Gillespie (7) | Booker, Gillespie (5) | Gainbridge Fieldhouse; 16,470 | 39–27 |
| 67 | March 13 | @ Toronto | L 115–122 | Jalen Green (34) | Ighodaro, O'Neale (6) | Grayson Allen (6) | Scotiabank Arena; 19,195 | 39–28 |
| 68 | March 16 | @ Boston | L 112–120 | Devin Booker (40) | Jalen Green (7) | Oso Ighodaro (8) | TD Garden; 19,156 | 39–29 |
| 69 | March 17 | @ Minnesota | L 104–116 | Devin Booker (34) | Oso Ighodaro (10) | Collin Gillespie (7) | Target Center; 17,309 | 39–30 |
| 70 | March 19 | @ San Antonio | L 100–101 | Collin Gillespie (24) | Tied (8) | Oso Ighodaro (7) | Frost Bank Center; 18,648 | 39–31 |
| 71 | March 21 | Milwaukee | L 105–108 | Jalen Green (24) | Ryan Dunn (8) | Devin Booker (7) | Mortgage Matchup Center; 17,071 | 39–32 |
| 72 | March 22 | Toronto | W 120–98 | Devin Booker (25) | Tied (7) | Jalen Green (7) | Mortgage Matchup Center; 17,071 | 40–32 |
| 73 | March 24 | Denver | L 123–125 | Devin Booker (22) | Jordan Goodwin (8) | Devin Booker (8) | Mortgage Matchup Center; 17,071 | 40–33 |
| 74 | March 28 | Utah | W 134–109 | Jalen Green (31) | Goodwin, Maluach (9) | Devin Booker (8) | Mortgage Matchup Center; 17,071 | 41–33 |
| 75 | March 30 | @ Memphis | W 131–105 | Devin Booker (36) | Khaman Maluach (11) | Collin Gillespie (10) | FedExForum; 14,661 | 42–33 |
| 76 | March 31 | @ Orlando | L 111–115 | Devin Booker (34) | Oso Ighodaro (10) | Devin Booker (7) | Kia Center; 19,117 | 42–34 |

April: 3–3 (home: 1–1; road: 2–2)

| Game | Date | Team | Score | High points | High rebounds | High assists | Location Attendance | Record |
|---|---|---|---|---|---|---|---|---|
| 77 | April 2 | @ Charlotte | L 107–127 | Jalen Green (25) | Oso Ighodaro (9) | Jalen Green (7) | Spectrum Center; 19,594 | 42–35 |
| 78 | April 5 | @ Chicago | W 120–110 | Devin Booker (30) | Mark Williams (8) | Booker, Green (4) | United Center; 20,941 | 43–35 |
| 79 | April 7 | Houston | L 105–119 | Devin Booker (31) | Mark Williams (8) | Devin Booker (8) | Mortgage Matchup Center; 17,071 | 43–36 |
| 80 | April 8 | Dallas | W 112–107 | Devin Booker (37) | Khaman Maluach (14) | Devin Booker (9) | Mortgage Matchup Center; 17,071 | 44–36 |
| 81 | April 10 | @ L.A. Lakers | L 73–101 | Dillon Brooks (12) | Oso Ighodaro (10) | Tied (3) | Crypto.com Arena; 18,997 | 44–37 |
| 82 | April 12 | @ Oklahoma City | W 135–103 | Jamaree Bouyea (27) | Khaman Maluach (14) | Jamaree Bouyea (9) | Paycom Center; 18,203 | 45–37 |

2025–26 season schedule

=== Play-in ===
This would officially mark the first season in franchise history where the Phoenix Suns would participate in what would become the NBA Play-In Tournament after previously coming surprisingly close to competing in it during the 2020 NBA Bubble. Unlike that setting, this play-in tournament would allow the Suns two chances to enter the playoffs due to them being the seventh-best team in the Western Conference by the end of this season. Their first-ever play-in tournament match against the #8 seeded Portland Trail Blazers would end in a heartbreaking upset at home after previously leading in double-digits during the fourth quarter. However, their second play-in tournament match against the #10 seeded Golden State Warriors (which would allow the winner to become the new #8 seed in the Western Conference) days later saw Phoenix crush Golden State's dreams of entering the playoffs properly with a 111–96 victory, thus allowing for the Suns to go up against the defending champions in the #1 seeded Oklahoma City Thunder instead of the #2 seeded San Antonio Spurs (thus failing to reignite the Suns–Spurs rivalry in the process) in the first round.

2026 play-in game log
Total: 1–1 (Home: 1–1; Road: 0–0)
Play-in: 1–1 (home: 1–1; road: 0–0)

| Game | Date | Team | Score | High points | High rebounds | High assists | Location Attendance | Record |
|---|---|---|---|---|---|---|---|---|
| 1 | April 14 | Portland | L 110–114 | Jalen Green (35) | Royce O'Neale (8) | Oso Ighodaro (6) | Mortgage Matchup Center; 17,071 | 0–1 |
| 2 | April 17 | Golden State | W 111–96 | Jalen Green (36) | Jordan Goodwin (9) | Devin Booker (8) | Mortgage Matchup Center; 17,071 | 1–1 |

2025–26 season schedule

=== Playoffs ===
2026 playoff game log
Total: 0–4 (home: 0–2; road: 0–2)
First Round: 0–4 (home: 0–2; road: 0–2)

| Game | Date | Team | Score | High points | High rebounds | High assists | Location Attendance | Series |
|---|---|---|---|---|---|---|---|---|
| 1 | April 19 | @ Oklahoma City | L 84–119 | Devin Booker (23) | Oso Ighodaro (9) | Ighodaro, O'Neale (3) | Paycom Center; 18,203 | 0–1 |
| 2 | April 22 | @ Oklahoma City | L 107–120 | Dillon Brooks (30) | Royce O'Neale (9) | Collin Gillespie (6) | Paycom Center; 18,203 | 0–2 |
| 3 | April 25 | Oklahoma City | L 109–121 | Dillon Brooks (33) | Collin Gillespie (10) | Devin Booker (7) | Mortgage Matchup Center; 17,071 | 0–3 |
| 4 | April 27 | Oklahoma City | L 122–131 | Devin Booker (24) | Oso Ighodaro (8) | Devin Booker (6) | Mortgage Matchup Center; 17,071 | 0–4 |

2026 playoff schedule

=== NBA Cup ===
On July 9, it was announced that the Suns would return to Group A once again for the 2025 NBA Cup, only this time, they would be competing against the defending NBA Finals champion Oklahoma City Thunder, Minnesota Timberwolves, Sacramento Kings, and Utah Jazz instead. This season, the Suns would defeat Utah and Sacramento with major ease, as well as provide an improbable last-minute comeback against the Timberwolves, but they ultimately would lose their last game in the group matches against the Thunder in a surprisingly close match. Unfortunately for the Suns, they would not only face off against the Thunder again in the quarterfinal round of the NBA Cup after qualifying for the actual tournament part of the NBA Cup for the second time in three seasons, but also do it without star shooting guard Devin Booker playing in that match this time around due to a timed injury at hand when Oklahoma City was also getting healthier. That would later result in not only the worst loss in NBA Cup history, but also the worst loss in franchise history.

==== West Group A ====
| Pos | Team | Pld | W | L | PF | PA | PD | Qualification |
|---|---|---|---|---|---|---|---|---|
| 1 | Oklahoma City Thunder | 4 | 4 | 0 | 512 | 437 | +75 | Advanced to knockout rounds |
| 2 | Phoenix Suns | 4 | 3 | 1 | 463 | 432 | +31 | Advanced to knockout rounds |
| 3 | Minnesota Timberwolves | 4 | 2 | 2 | 479 | 434 | +45 | |
| 4 | Utah Jazz | 4 | 1 | 3 | 433 | 518 | −85 | |
| 5 | Sacramento Kings | 4 | 0 | 4 | 430 | 496 | −66 | |

Source: NBA

Games

Note: Times are Eastern Time (UTC−4 or UTC−5) as listed by the NBA. If the venue is located in a different time zone, the local time is also given.

NBA League Pass

October 31
10:00 p.m. (8:00 p.m. Mountain)

Recap

Utah Jazz 96, Phoenix Suns 118
Scoring by quarter: 17–37, 23–17, 27–29, 29–35
| Pts: Lauri Markkanen (33); Rebs: Walker Kessler (13); Asts: Keyonte George (9) | Pts: Devin Booker (36); Rebs: Ryan Dunn (10); Asts: Devin Booker (9) |

Mortgage Matchup Center, Phoenix, AZ
Attendance: 17,071
Referees: Tony Brothers, Leon Wood, John Butler

NBA League Pass

November 21
9:00 p.m. (7:00 p.m. Mountain)

Recap

Minnesota Timberwolves 113, Phoenix Suns 114
Scoring by quarter: 24–32, 25–30, 33–19, 31–33
| Pts: Anthony Edwards (41); Rebs: Rudy Gobert (12); Asts: Edwards, Gobert (4) | Pts: Dillon Brooks (22); Rebs: Mark Williams (8); Asts: Devin Booker (10) |

Mortgage Matchup Center, Phoenix, AZ
Attendance: 17,071
Referees: Eric Dalen, Kevin Scott, Robert Hussey

NBA League Pass

November 26
10:00 p.m. (7:00 p.m. Pacific)

Recap

Phoenix Suns 112, Sacramento Kings 100
Scoring by quarter: 41–16, 26–29, 16–28, 29–27
| Pts: Gillespie, Williams (21); Rebs: Mark Williams (16); Asts: Collin Gillespie (9) | Pts: Murray, Westbrook (19); Rebs: Drew Eubanks (9); Asts: Achiuwa, DeRozan, Murray, Westbrook (3) |

Golden 1 Center, Sacramento, CA
Attendance: 17,961
Referees: Sean Corbin, Bill Kennedy, Matt Kallio

NBA League Pass

November 28
9:30 p.m. (8:30 p.m. Central)

Recap

Phoenix Suns 119, Oklahoma City Thunder 123
Scoring by quarter: 25–25, 27–31, 30–38, 37–29
| Pts: Collin Gillespie (24); Rebs: Mark Williams (14); Asts: Devin Booker (6) | Pts: Shai Gilgeous-Alexander (37); Rebs: Chet Holmgren (8); Asts: Gilgeous-Alexander, Jal. Williams (8) |

Paycom Center, Oklahoma City, OK
Attendance: 18,203
Referees: James Capers, Nate Green, Evan Scott

Amazon Prime Video

December 10
7:30 p.m. (6:30 p.m. Central)

Recap

Phoenix Suns 89, Oklahoma City Thunder 138
Scoring by quarter: 23–38, 25–36, 24–36, 17–28
| Pts: Dillon Brooks (16); Rebs: Ighodaro, Richards, Williams (5); Asts: Jamaree Bouyea (5) | Pts: Shai Gilgeous-Alexander (28); Rebs: Chet Holmgren (8); Asts: Shai Gilgeous-Alexander (8) |

Paycom Center, Oklahoma City, OK
Attendance: 18,203
Referees: James Williams, Ray Acosta, Danielle Scott

== Awards, honors, and records ==
- Entering this season, Devin Booker would become the fourth player in franchise history to stay with the Phoenix Suns for at least eleven years, joining the likes of Walter Davis, Kevin Johnson, and Alvan Adams as the only other Suns players to stay with the team for that same amount of time. Booker would make his regular season debut on October 22, 2025, with 31 points scored in a comeback 120–116 win over the Sacramento Kings to start out this season.
- On April 4, 2026, both former head coach Mike D'Antoni and power forward/center Amar'e Stoudemire would be named as inductees for the Naismith Basketball Hall of Fame, with their inductions being made official by August 17, 2026.

=== Week/Month ===
- On February 2, 2026, Dillon Brooks would earn his first ever Player of the Week Award for his performances throughout the week of January 25–February 1, 2026 to get the Suns a 3–1 record when star shooting guard Devin Booker was serously injured. Despite the Suns ending the week with a bad loss against the Los Angeles Clippers, Brooks would be the primary player leading the Suns to three key victories throughout the week with averages of 28.8 points, 4.5 rebounds, and 2.8 assists per game alongside a higher three-point shooting percentage (54.5%) than overall field goal shooting percentage (53.5%) during that time.
- Also on February 2, rookie head coach Jordan Ott would earn his first ever Coach of the Month honors for helping lead the Suns to an 11–January 5, which included a 7–1 home record and was tied for the most wins in the month of January this season. With this honor, Ott not only becomes the eighth Suns head coach to win Coach of the Month honors, but also joins former Suns players Paul Westphal and Jeff Hornacek as the only other head coaches to win the honor while in their inaugural head coaching seasons.

=== All-Star ===
- On February 1, Devin Booker was announced to have earned his fifth All-Star Team selection as a reserve member for what would be considered the Stars team in what was considered the equivalent of Team U.S.A. Vs. World Team version of the All-Star Game this year. With his fifth All-Star appearance in the last seven seasons, he now joins Walter Davis, Steve Nash, and Amar'e Stoudemire as the only Suns players to have at least five All-Star selections while with the franchise.
- On February 4, Mat Ishbia, a co-owner of the Phoenix Suns, would be named a competitor for the NBA All-Star Weekend Celebrity Game, playing for Team Anthony, which has Anthony Anderson as the head coach (alongside player development coach Chris Brickley and shooting coach Lethal Shooter as assistant coaches) and former NBA player Jason Williams, Los Angeles Chargers wide receiver Keenan Allen, Andre De Grasse, Badshah, Mustard, Simu Liu, Adrien Nunez, Taylor Frankie Paul, Dude Perfect member Cody Jones, and Nicolas Vansteenberghe as his fellow teammates for the event.
- On February 8, Devin Booker was announced to his fourth Three-Point Contest after previously participating in the event in 2016, 2018, and 2020 (winning it all beforehand in 2018 with a then-record-high 28 points scored) despite him being at his lowest shooting percentage from the three-point line entering the event yet.

=== Team records ===
- On November 6, 2025, Jalen Green would have the highest number of three-pointers made in a Suns debut game with six three-pointers made in a 115–102 win against the Los Angeles Clippers at home. Not only that, but the 29 points he scored that night would be the second-most points scored for a Phoenix debut behind Charles Barkley's debut game against the Clippers where he scored 35 points on November 7, 1992, nearly 33 years ago.
- Four days after Jalen Green's debut, on November 10, Grayson Allen would score a new record-high 10 three-pointers made (breaking a long-standing tie that included Grayson Allen himself and six other now-former Suns players tying an overall NBA season for threes made at the time) for a new career-high 42 points scored in a blowout 121–98 win over the New Orleans Pelicans.
- On January 2, 2026, the Suns would have their most efficient shooting night for two-point field goals with them making 41 of 56 of those shots in particular for a 73.2% field goal shooting percentage for that specific area. The high shooting percentage for two-point field goals would help with the Suns getting a 129–102 blowout win over the Sacramento Kings at home to start the new year out on their end.
- On April 2, 2026, Collin Gillespie would surpass Quentin Richardson for the most three-pointers made by a Suns player in one season, with it happening in a loss against the Charlotte Hornets. Gillespie ended the season with 232 made three-pointers for the Suns, not including the play-in tournament with another three-pointer made against the Portland Trail Blazers.

== Player statistics ==
Legend
| GP | Games played | GS | Games started | MPG | Minutes per game |
| FG% | Field-goal percentage | 3P% | 3-point field-goal percentage | FT% | Free-throw percentage |
| RPG | Rebounds per game | APG | Assists per game | SPG | Steals per game |
| BPG | Blocks per game | PPG | Points per game |

=== Regular season ===
Phoenix Suns statistics
| Player | GP | GS | MPG | FG% | 3P% | FT% | RPG | APG | SPG | BPG | PPG |
|---|---|---|---|---|---|---|---|---|---|---|---|
| Grayson Allen | 51 | 27 | 28.8 | .403 | .349 | .857 | 3.0 | 3.8 | 1.4 | .3 | 16.5 |
| Devin Booker | 64 | 64 | 33.5 | .456 | .330 | .873 | 3.9 | 6.0 | .8 | .3 | 26.1 |
| Jamaree Bouyea | 46 | 1 | 14.0 | .458 | .295 | .686 | 1.8 | 1.8 | .6 | .3 | 5.7 |
| Koby Brea | 12 | 0 | 7.0 | .417 | .433 | 1.000 | .7 | .8 | .1 | .0 | 3.8 |
| Dillon Brooks | 56 | 56 | 30.4 | .435 | .344 | .842 | 3.6 | 1.8 | 1.0 | .2 | 20.2 |
| Amir Coffey^{†} | 16 | 1 | 14.1 | .500 | .417 | .692 | 1.9 | 1.0 | .4 | .1 | 4.8 |
| Ryan Dunn | 70 | 16 | 19.4 | .453 | .331 | .489 | 4.2 | 1.5 | .9 | .4 | 5.8 |
| Rasheer Fleming | 55 | 1 | 12.2 | .405 | .346 | .559 | 2.3 | .3 | .4 | .4 | 4.3 |
| Collin Gillespie | 80 | 58 | 28.5 | .418 | .401 | .874 | 4.1 | 4.6 | 1.2 | .2 | 12.7 |
| Jordan Goodwin | 70 | 10 | 22.5 | .413 | .371 | .696 | 4.9 | 2.2 | 1.5 | .2 | 8.7 |
| Jalen Green | 32 | 27 | 25.9 | .422 | .313 | .747 | 3.6 | 2.8 | 1.1 | .3 | 17.8 |
| Nigel Hayes-Davis | 27 | 0 | 7.2 | .326 | .125 | .500 | 1.2 | .3 | .3 | .1 | 1.3 |
| Haywood Highsmith | 7 | 0 | 13.0 | .522 | .571 | .857 | 1.9 | 1.0 | .6 | .0 | 5.4 |
| C. J. Huntley | 4 | 0 | 10.0 | .545 | .000 | | 1.3 | .5 | .3 | .0 | 3.0 |
| Oso Ighodaro | 82 | 24 | 22.0 | .653 | .000 | .453 | 5.1 | 2.3 | .9 | .7 | 6.5 |
| Isaiah Livers | 36 | 0 | 9.6 | .344 | .300 | .750 | 1.7 | .6 | .4 | .2 | 1.8 |
| Khaman Maluach | 46 | 1 | 8.9 | .533 | .238 | .710 | 2.9 | .1 | .1 | .7 | 3.0 |
| Royce O'Neale | 78 | 67 | 28.4 | .421 | .408 | .711 | 4.8 | 2.7 | 1.1 | .4 | 9.8 |
| Nick Richards^{†} | 28 | 2 | 9.1 | .493 | | .679 | 3.3 | .3 | .1 | .5 | 3.2 |
| Mark Williams | 60 | 55 | 23.6 | .644 | 1.000 | .771 | 8.0 | 1.0 | .9 | .9 | 11.7 |

=== Playoffs ===
Phoenix Suns statistics
| Player | GP | GS | MPG | FG% | 3P% | FT% | RPG | APG | SPG | BPG | PPG |
|---|---|---|---|---|---|---|---|---|---|---|---|
| Grayson Allen | 2 | 0 | 19.0 | .462 | .364 | .750 | 2.0 | 2.0 | .0 | 1.0 | 9.5 |
| Devin Booker | 4 | 4 | 38.3 | .460 | .250 | .786 | 4.3 | 4.8 | .3 | .3 | 21.3 |
| Jamaree Bouyea | 4 | 0 | 2.3 | .500 | | .500 | .8 | .3 | .3 | .0 | 1.3 |
| Dillon Brooks | 4 | 4 | 37.3 | .459 | .438 | 1.000 | 6.0 | 1.8 | .3 | .3 | 26.0 |
| Amir Coffey | 4 | 0 | 1.5 | | | | .0 | .0 | .0 | .0 | .0 |
| Ryan Dunn | 4 | 0 | 8.5 | .000 | .000 | | 1.5 | .5 | .0 | .0 | .0 |
| Rasheer Fleming | 4 | 0 | 4.5 | .600 | .600 | | .3 | .0 | .5 | .3 | 2.3 |
| Collin Gillespie | 4 | 3 | 28.5 | .444 | .400 | .000 | 5.0 | 3.8 | 1.3 | .3 | 10.5 |
| Jordan Goodwin | 1 | 1 | 5.0 | .250 | .000 | | .0 | .0 | .0 | .0 | 2.0 |
| Jalen Green | 4 | 4 | 37.8 | .386 | .206 | .800 | 5.3 | 3.5 | 2.0 | .3 | 21.8 |
| Haywood Highsmith | 2 | 0 | 5.5 | .000 | .000 | | 1.5 | .5 | .0 | .0 | .0 |
| Oso Ighodaro | 4 | 4 | 32.3 | .542 | | .667 | 7.0 | 4.0 | .5 | .8 | 7.5 |
| Khaman Maluach | 4 | 0 | 11.3 | .500 | .000 | | 2.3 | .0 | .0 | .0 | 2.0 |
| Royce O'Neale | 4 | 0 | 24.3 | .643 | .615 | .833 | 6.3 | 2.3 | .5 | .3 | 7.8 |

- ^{†} Denotes player spent time with another team in the season. Stats reflect time with the Suns only.

== Transactions ==
=== Trades ===
| Date | Trade | | Ref. |
|---|---|---|---|
| June 30, 2025 | To Charlotte Hornets: Vasilije Micić; Draft rights to Liam McNeeley (No. 29); 2029 first-round pick (Note: The least favorable of the picks originally belonging to Cleveland, Timberwolves (if No. 6–30), and Utah.) | To Phoenix Suns: Mark Williams; Own 2029 second-round pick | |
| July 6, 2025 | Seven-team trade | | |
| July 6, 2025 | To Atlanta Hawks: David Roddy (two-way contract); 2031 second-round pick swap (Note: Atlanta may swap their own pick for Houston's pick.); Cash considerations | To Los Angeles Lakers: Draft rights to Adou Thiero (No. 36) | |
| July 6, 2025 | To Brooklyn Nets: 2026 second-round pick (from L.A. Clippers) (Note: The second-most favorable of the picks originally belonging to Boston, Indiana, the L.A. Clippers, and Miami. (Would later become the selection from the Los Angeles Clippers.)); 2030 second-round pick (from Boston) | To Houston Rockets: Kevin Durant; Clint Capela (sign-and-trade) | |
| July 6, 2025 | To Phoenix Suns: Jalen Green; Dillon Brooks; Daeqwon Plowden (two-way contract); Draft rights to Khaman Maluach (No. 10); Draft rights to Rasheer Fleming (No. 31); Draft rights to Koby Brea (No. 41); 2026 second-round pick (from Philadelphia) (Note: The second-most favorable of the picks originally belonging to Dallas, Oklahoma City, and Philadelphia. (Would later officially become the selection from the Philadelphia 76ers.)); 2032 second-round pick (Note: Least favorable between Houston and Minnesota.) | To Minnesota Timberwolves: Draft rights to Rocco Zikarsky (No. 45); 2026 second-round pick (from Golden State) (Note: The less favorable of the picks originally belonging to Denver and Golden State. (Would later become the selection from the Golden State Warriors.)); 2032 second-round pick (Note: The less favorable of the picks originally belonging to Houston and Phoenix.); Cash considerations | |
| July 6, 2025 | To Golden State Warriors: Draft rights to Alex Toohey (No. 52); Draft rights to Jahmai Mashack (No. 59) | | |
| February 5, 2026 | Three-team trade | | |
| February 5, 2026 | To Milwaukee Bucks: Ousmane Dieng; Nigel Hayes-Davis | To Chicago Bulls: Nick Richards | |
| February 5, 2026 | To Phoenix Suns: Amir Coffey; Cole Anthony | | |

=== Free agency ===
==== Re-signed ====
| Player | Signed | Date | Ref. |
|---|---|---|---|
| Collin Gillespie | Signed 1-year deal worth $2,378,870 | July 2, 2025 | |
| Devin Booker | Signed 2-year contract extension worth $145 million | July 9, 2025 | |

==== Additions ====
| Player | Signed | Former team(s) | Ref. |
|---|---|---|---|
| C. J. Huntley | Signed 2-year two-way contract worth around $1,272,870 / Signed 2-year two-way contract worth around $790,057 | Appalachian State Mountaineers / Phoenix Suns / Valley Suns | |
| Isaiah Livers | Signed two-way contract worth $636,435 | Detroit Pistons / Washington Wizards | |
| Nigel Hayes-Davis | Signed 1-year deal worth $2,048,494 | (Turkey) Fenerbahçe Beko | |
| Jordan Goodwin | Signed 1-year partially guaranteed deal worth $2,349,578 | Los Angeles Lakers | |
| Jamaree Bouyea | Signed two-way contract worth $636,435 / Signed 2-year partially guaranteed deal worth $3,158,749 | Milwaukee Bucks / Wisconsin Herd / Austin Spurs / Phoenix Suns | |
| Haywood Highsmith | Signed 2-year partially guaranteed deal worth $3,846,142 | Miami Heat / Brooklyn Nets | |

==== Subtractions ====
| Player | Reason | New team(s) | Ref. |
|---|---|---|---|
| Vasilije Micić | Traded | Charlotte Hornets / Milwaukee Bucks / (Israel) Hapoel Tel Aviv B.C. | |
| Cody Martin | Waived | Indiana Pacers / Noblesville Boom | |
| Kevin Durant | Traded | Houston Rockets | |
| Daeqwon Plowden | Waived two-way contract | Sacramento Kings / Stockton Kings | |
| Tyus Jones | Unrestricted free agent | Orlando Magic / Dallas Mavericks / Denver Nuggets | |
| Mason Plumlee | Unrestricted free agent | Charlotte Hornets / San Antonio Spurs | |
| Bradley Beal | Waived / Bought out contract | Los Angeles Clippers | |
| TyTy Washington Jr. | Restricted free agent | Los Angeles Clippers / San Diego Clippers | |
| Jalen Bridges | Restricted free agent | Boston Celtics / Maine Celtics | |
| Damion Lee | Unrestricted free agent | (Israel) Ironi Ness Ziona B.C. | |
| Monté Morris | Unrestricted free agent | Indiana Pacers / (Greece) Olympiacos Piraeus B.C. | |
| Bol Bol | Unrestricted free agent | (Philippines) TNT Tropang 5G | |
| C. J. Huntley | Waived two-way contract | Valley Suns / Phoenix Suns | |
| Nigel Hayes-Davis | Traded | Milwaukee Bucks / (Greece) Panathinaikos AKTOR Athens B.C. | |
| Nick Richards | Traded | Chicago Bulls | |
| Cole Anthony | Waived | | |
