= 2024–25 Kentucky Wildcats men's basketball team =

American college basketball season

2024–25 Kentucky Wildcats men's basketball

NCAA tournament, Sweet Sixteen
- Conference: Southeastern Conference

Ranking
- Coaches: No. 14
- AP: No. 12
- Record: 24–12 (10–8 SEC)
- Head coach: Mark Pope (1st season)
- Associate head coach: Alvin Brooks III (1st season)
- Assistant coaches: Mark Fox (1st season); Cody Fueger (1st season); Jason Hart (1st season); Mikhail McLean (1st season)
- Home arena: Rupp Arena

2024–25 Southeastern Conference men's basketball standings
	Conf.				Overall
Team	W		L	PCT	W		L	PCT
No. 4 Auburn	15	–	3	.833	32	–	6	.842
No. 1 Florida †	14	–	4	.778	36	–	4	.900
No. 6 Alabama	13	–	5	.722	28	–	9	.757
No. 5 Tennessee	12	–	6	.667	30	–	8	.789
No. 19 Texas A&M	11	–	7	.611	23	–	11	.676
No. 12 Kentucky	10	–	8	.556	24	–	12	.667
Missouri	10	–	8	.556	22	–	12	.647
No. 18 Ole Miss	10	–	8	.556	24	–	12	.667
No. 20 Arkansas	8	–	10	.444	22	–	14	.611
Mississippi State	8	–	10	.444	21	–	13	.618
Georgia	8	–	10	.444	20	–	13	.606
Vanderbilt	8	–	10	.444	20	–	13	.606
Texas	6	–	12	.333	19	–	16	.543
Oklahoma	6	–	12	.333	20	–	14	.588
LSU	3	–	15	.167	14	–	18	.438
South Carolina	2	–	16	.111	12	–	20	.375
† 2025 SEC tournament winner Rankings from AP poll

The 2024–25 Kentucky Wildcats men's basketball team represented the University of Kentucky during the 2024–25 NCAA Division I men's basketball season. The Wildcats, founding members of the Southeastern Conference, played their home games at Rupp Arena and were led by Mark Pope in his first season as head coach for the Wildcats.

The Kentucky Wildcats drew an average home attendance of 20,334, the 2nd-highest of all basketball teams in the world.

== Previous season ==
The Wildcats finished the 2023–24 season with a record of 23–8, 13–5 in SEC play to finish in a 3-way tie for second place in the SEC. Despite being the number two seed in the SEC tournament, they were upset in the quarterfinal round by Texas A&M. They received an at-large bid to the NCAA tournament where they got upset by Oakland in the first round, finishing the season with an overall record of 23–10 record. This marked John Calipari's final season as Kentucky's head coach, he left for Arkansas a month later.

== Offseason ==
=== Departures ===
Name	Number	Pos.	Height	Weight	Year	Hometown	Reason for departure
Rob Dillingham	0	G	6'3"	176	Freshman	Hickory, NC	Declared for 2024 NBA draft
Justin Edwards	1	G	6'8"	203	Freshman	Philadelphia, PA	Declared for 2024 NBA draft
Aaron Bradshaw	2	F	7'1"	226	Freshman	Roselle, NJ	Transferred to Ohio State
Adou Thiero	3	G	6'8"	222	Sophomore	Leetsdale, PA	Transferred to Arkansas
Tre Mitchell	4	F	6'9"	231	GS Senior	Pittsburgh, PA	Graduated
Antonio Reeves	12	G	6'6"	195	GS Senior	Chicago, IL	Graduated/2024 NBA draft
Brennan Canada	14	F	6'5"	200	GS Senior	Mount Sterling, KY	Graduated
Reed Sheppard	15	G	6'3"	187	Freshman	London, KY	Declared for 2024 NBA draft
Joey Hart	20	G	6'5"	203	Freshman	Linton, IN	Transferred to Ball State
D. J. Wagner	21	G	6'4"	192	Freshman	Camden, NJ	Transferred to Arkansas
Jordan Burks	23	G	6'8"	202	Freshman	Decatur, AL	Transferred to Georgetown
Kareem Watkins	25	G	5'8"	175	Senior	Camden, NJ	Walk-on; graduated
Ugonna Onyenso	33	F	7'0"	247	Sophomore	Owerri, Nigeria	Transferred to Kansas State
Zvonimir Ivišić	44	F	7'2"	234	Freshman	Vodice, Croatia	Transferred to Arkansas

=== Incoming transfers ===
Name	Num	Pos.	Height	Weight	Year	Hometown	Previous college
Otega Oweh	00	G	6'5"	210	Junior	Somerset, NJ	Oklahoma
Lamont Butler	1	G	6'2"	207	GS Senior	Moreno Valley, CA	San Diego State
Jaxson Robinson	2	G	6'7"	200	GS Senior	Ada, OK	BYU
Koby Brea	4	G	6'6"	205	GS Senior	Washington Heights, NY	Dayton
Andrew Carr	7	F	6'10"	220	GS Senior	West Chester, PA	Wake Forest
Brandon Garrison	10	C	6'11"	245	Sophomore	Oklahoma City, OK	Oklahoma State
Ansley Almonor	15	F	6'7"	244	Senior	Spring Valley, NY	Fairleigh Dickinson
Amari Williams	22	C	6'10"	255	GS Senior	Nottingham, England	Drexel
Kerr Kriisa	77	G	6'3"	190	GS Senior	Tartu, Estonia	West Virginia

=== Class of 2024 commitments ===
College recruiting
Name	Hometown	School	Height	Weight	Commit date
Collin Chandler #6 SG	Farmington, UT	Farmington High School	6 ft 4 in (1.93 m)	175 lb (79 kg)	Apr 22, 2024
Collin Chandler #6 SG	Recruit ratings: Rivals: 247Sports: ESPN: (89)				
Travis Perry #15 PG	Eddyville, KY	Lyon County High School	6 ft 1 in (1.85 m)	170 lb (77 kg)	Nov 12, 2023
Travis Perry #15 PG	Recruit ratings: Rivals: 247Sports: ESPN: (84)				
Trent Noah; SG	Harlan, KY	Harlan County High School	6 ft 6 in (1.98 m)	200 lb (91 kg)	May 8, 2024
Trent Noah; SG	Recruit ratings: Rivals: 247Sports: ESPN: (77)				
Overall recruit ranking:
Note: In many cases, Scout, Rivals, 247Sports, On3, and ESPN may conflict in their listings of height and weight.; In these cases, the average was taken. ESPN grades are on a 100-point scale.; Sources: "Kentucky 2024 Basketball Commitments". Rivals.; "2024 Kentucky Basketball Commits". ESPN.; "2024 Team Ranking". Rivals.; "Kentucky 2024 Basketball Commits". 247Sports.

== Roster ==
2024–25 Kentucky Wildcats men's basketball team
Players
Coaches

Pos.	#	Name	Height	Weight	Year	Previous school	Hometown
G	00	Otega Oweh	6 ft 4 in (1.93 m)	208 lb (94 kg)	Jr	Oklahoma	Newark, NJ
G	1	Lamont Butler	6 ft 2 in (1.88 m)	204 lb (93 kg)	GS	San Diego State	Moreno Valley, CA
G	2	Jaxson Robinson	6 ft 6 in (1.98 m)	191 lb (87 kg)	GS	BYU	Ada, OK
G	4	Koby Brea	6 ft 7 in (2.01 m)	206 lb (93 kg)	GS	Dayton	Washington Heights, NY
G	5	Collin Chandler	6 ft 5 in (1.96 m)	187 lb (85 kg)	Fr	Farmington	Farmington, UT
F	7	Andrew Carr	6 ft 10 in (2.08 m)	227 lb (103 kg)	GS	Wake Forest	West Chester, PA
F	9	Trent Noah	6 ft 5 in (1.96 m)	209 lb (95 kg)	Fr	Harlan County	Harlan, KY
C	10	Brandon Garrison	6 ft 10 in (2.08 m)	245 lb (111 kg)	So	Oklahoma State	Oklahoma City, OK
G	11	Travis Perry	6 ft 1 in (1.85 m)	178 lb (81 kg)	Fr	Lyon County	Eddyville, KY
G	13	Grant Darbyshire (W)	6 ft 3 in (1.91 m)	190 lb (86 kg)	Jr	Sycamore	Cincinnati, OH
F	15	Ansley Almonor	6 ft 7 in (2.01 m)	232 lb (105 kg)	Sr	Fairleigh Dickinson	Spring Valley, NY
F	20	Zach Tow (W)	6 ft 5 in (1.96 m)	215 lb (98 kg)	Jr	Madisonville North Hopkins	Madisonville, KY
G	21	Walker Horn (W)	6 ft 3 in (1.91 m)	183 lb (83 kg)	Jr	Westlake	Austin, TX
C	22	Amari Williams	7 ft 0 in (2.13 m)	265 lb (120 kg)	GS	Drexel	Nottingham, England
G	77	Kerr Kriisa	6 ft 3 in (1.91 m)	190 lb (86 kg)	GS	West Virginia	Tartu, Estonia

Head coach

- Mark Pope (Kentucky)

Assistant coach(es)

- Alvin Brooks III (Idaho State)
- Mark Fox (Eastern New Mexico)
- Cody Fueger (Utah)
- Mikhail McClean (Houston)

Legend

- (C) Team captain
- (S) Suspended
- (I) Ineligible
- (W) Walk-on
- Injured
- Current redshirt

Roster

== Schedule and results ==
Date time, TV	Rank^{#}	Opponent^{#}	Result	Record	High points	High rebounds	High assists	Site (attendance) city, state
Exhibition
October 23, 2024*; 7:00 p.m., SECN+/ESPN+	No. 23	Kentucky Wesleyan	W 123–52	–	19 – Robinson	6 – Butler	6 – Tied	Rupp Arena (18,522); Lexington, KY
October 29, 2024*; 7:00 p.m., SECN+/ESPN+	No. 23	Minnesota State Mankato	W 98–67	–	24 – Robinson	6 – Robinson	6 – Tied	Rupp Arena (18,739); Lexington, KY
Non-conference regular season
November 4, 2024*; 7:00 p.m., ESPNU	No. 23	Wright State	W 103–62	1–0	21 – Oweh	13 – Williams	5 – Tied	Rupp Arena (19,635); Lexington, KY
November 9, 2024*; 4:00 p.m., SECN+/ESPN+	No. 23	Bucknell	W 100–72	2–0	20 – Brea	14 – Williams	12 – Kriisa	Rupp Arena (20,048); Lexington, KY
November 12, 2024*; 9:00 p.m., ESPN	No. 19	vs. No. 6 Duke; Champions Classic	W 77–72	3–0	17 – Carr	8 – Williams	4 – Butler	State Farm Arena (16,107); Atlanta, GA
November 19, 2024*; 7:00 p.m., SECN+/ESPN+	No. 9	Lipscomb; BBN Invitational	W 97–68	4–0	20 – Robinson	11 – Williams	2 – Tied	Rupp Arena (19,314); Lexington, KY
November 22, 2024*; 7:00 p.m., SECN+/ESPN+	No. 9	Jackson State; BBN Invitational	W 108–59	5–0	22 – Brea	8 – Tied	7 – Kriisa	Rupp Arena (19,961); Lexington, KY
November 26, 2024*; 6:30 p.m., ESPNU	No. 8	Western Kentucky; BBN Invitational	W 87–68	6–0	18 – Tied	10 – Tied	4 – Tied	Rupp Arena (20,049); Lexington, KY
November 29, 2024*; 7:00 p.m., SECN	No. 8	Georgia State	W 105–76	7–0	19 – Robinson	8 – Carr	6 – Butler	Rupp Arena (19,914); Lexington, KY
December 3, 2024*; 9:30 p.m., ESPN	No. 4	at Clemson; ACC–SEC Challenge	L 66–70	7–1	17 – Oweh	11 – Williams	5 – Butler	Littlejohn Coliseum (9,000); Clemson, SC
December 7, 2024*; 10:00 p.m., ESPN2	No. 4	vs. No. 7 Gonzaga; Battle in Seattle	W 90–89 ^{OT}	8–1	19 – Carr	9 – Garrison	5 – Robinson	Climate Pledge Arena (17,846); Seattle, WA
December 11, 2024*; 8:00 p.m., ESPN2	No. 5	Colgate	W 78–67	9–1	17 – Brea	10 – Carr	4 – Oweh	Rupp Arena (19,646); Lexington, KY
December 14, 2024*; 5:15 p.m., ESPN	No. 5	Louisville; Rivalry	W 93–85	10–1	33 – Butler	9 – Carr	6 – Butler	Rupp Arena (21,093); Lexington, KY
December 21, 2024*; 5:30 p.m., CBS	No. 4	vs. Ohio State; CBS Sports Classic	L 65–85	10–2	21 – Oweh	8 – Williams	5 – Butler	Madison Square Garden (19,812); New York City, NY
December 31, 2024*; 2:00 p.m., ESPNU	No. 10	Brown	W 88–54	11–2	14 – Carr	5 – Tied	4 – Garrison	Rupp Arena (20,042); Lexington, KY
SEC regular season
January 4, 2025; 11:00 a.m., ESPN	No. 10	No. 6 Florida; Rivalry	W 106–100	12–2 (1–0)	23 – Brea	8 – Williams	8 – Butler	Rupp Arena (21,093); Lexington, KY
January 7, 2025; 7:00 p.m., SECN	No. 6	at Georgia	L 69–82	12–3 (1–1)	20 – Butler	7 – Oweh	3 – Butler	Stegeman Coliseum (10,523); Athens, GA
January 11, 2025; 8:30 p.m., SECN	No. 6	at No. 14 Mississippi State	W 95–90	13–3 (2–1)	27 – Robinson	12 – Williams	8 – Butler	Humphrey Coliseum (9,551); Starkville, MS
January 14, 2025; 7:00 p.m., ESPN2	No. 8	No. 11 Texas A&M	W 81–69	14–3 (3–1)	22 – Robinson	12 – Williams	7 – Butler	Rupp Arena (20,039); Lexington, KY
January 18, 2025; 12:00 p.m., ESPN	No. 8	No. 4 Alabama	L 97–102	14–4 (3–2)	21 – Oweh	11 – Williams	8 – Butler	Rupp Arena (21,108); Lexington, KY
January 25, 2025; 2:30 p.m., ESPN	No. 9	at Vanderbilt	L 69–74	14–5 (3–3)	21 – Oweh	12 – Oweh	4 – Williams	Memorial Gymnasium (14,316); Nashville, TN
January 28, 2025; 7:00 p.m., ESPN	No. 12	at No. 8 Tennessee; Rivalry	W 78–73	15–5 (4–3)	18 – Brea	15 – Williams	4 – Williams	Thompson–Boling Arena (22,272); Knoxville, TN
February 1, 2025; 9:00 p.m., ESPN	No. 12	Arkansas	L 79–89	15–6 (4–4)	22 – Williams	11 – Williams	3 – Williams	Rupp Arena (21,266); Lexington, KY
February 4, 2025; 7:00 p.m., ESPN	No. 14	at No. 25 Ole Miss	L 84–98	15–7 (4–5)	24 – Oweh	11 – Williams	10 – Williams	SJB Pavilion (9,128); Oxford, MS
February 8, 2025; 12:00 p.m., ESPN2	No. 14	South Carolina	W 80–57	16–7 (5–5)	17 – Oweh	6 – Williams	6 – Brea	Rupp Arena (20,003); Lexington, KY
February 11, 2025; 7:00 p.m., ESPN	No. 15	No. 5 Tennessee; Rivalry	W 75–64	17–7 (6–5)	13 – Tied	6 – Oweh	4 – Butler	Rupp Arena (20,076); Lexington, KY
February 15, 2025; 8:00 p.m., ESPN	No. 15	at Texas	L 78–82	17–8 (6–6)	20 – Oweh	12 – Williams	3 – Tied	Moody Center (11,060); Austin, TX
February 19, 2025; 7:00 p.m., SECN	No. 17	Vanderbilt	W 82–61	18–8 (7–6)	20 – Oweh	7 – Oweh	3 – Tied	Rupp Arena (20,164); Lexington, KY
February 22, 2025; 6:00 p.m., ESPN	No. 17	at No. 4 Alabama	L 83–96	18–9 (7–7)	20 – Brea	11 – Williams	6 – Williams	Coleman Coliseum (13,474); Tuscaloosa, AL
February 26, 2025; 9:00 p.m., SECN	No. 17	at Oklahoma	W 83–82	19–9 (8–7)	28 – Oweh	7 – Brea	6 – Butler	Lloyd Noble Center (10,162); Norman, OK
March 1, 2025; 1:00 p.m., ABC	No. 17	No. 1 Auburn	L 78–94	19–10 (8–8)	21 – Brea	14 – Williams	7 – Williams	Rupp Arena (21,268); Lexington, KY
March 4, 2025; 7:00 p.m., ESPN2	No. 19	LSU	W 95–64	20–10 (9–8)	24 – Oweh	8 – Oweh	5 – Butler	Rupp Arena (21,288); Lexington, KY
March 8, 2025; 12:00 p.m., ESPN	No. 19	at No. 15 Missouri	W 91–83	21–10 (10–8)	22 – Oweh	12 – Carr	3 – Carr	Mizzou Arena (15,061); Columbia, MO
SEC tournament
March 13, 2025; 9:30 p.m., SECN	(6) No. 15	vs. (14) Oklahoma; Second round	W 85–84	22–10	27 – Oweh	6 – Noah	5 – Oweh	Bridgestone Arena (16,347); Nashville, TN
March 14, 2025; 9:30 p.m., SECN	(6) No. 15	vs. (3) No. 5 Alabama; Quarterfinal	L 70–99	22–11	18 – Carr	7 – Williams	4 – Williams	Bridgestone Arena (18,608); Nashville, TN
NCAA tournament
March 21, 2025*; 7:10 p.m., CBS	(3 MW) No. 18	vs. (14 MW) Troy; First round	W 76–57	23–11	20 – Oweh	13 – Williams	6 – Oweh	Fiserv Forum (16,894); Milwaukee, WI
March 23, 2025*; 5:15 p.m., CBS	(3 MW) No. 18	vs. (6 MW) Illinois; Second round	W 84–75	24–11	23 – Brea	10 – Williams	6 – Williams	Fiserv Forum (16,829); Milwaukee, WI
March 28, 2025*; 7:39 p.m., TBS/TruTV	(3 MW) No. 18	vs. (2 MW) No. 6 Tennessee; Sweet Sixteen	L 65–78	24–12	18 – Butler	6 – Butler	3 – Tied	Lucas Oil Stadium (28,968); Indianapolis, IN
*Non-conference game. ^{#}Rankings from AP Poll. (#) Tournament seedings in parentheses. MW=Midwest. All times are in Eastern Time.

== Rankings ==
Ranking movements Legend: ██ Increase in ranking ██ Decrease in ranking
	Week																				
Poll	Pre	1	2	3	4	5	6	7	8	9	10	11	12	13	14	15	16	17	18	19	Final
AP	23	19	9	8	4	5	4	10	10	6	8	9	12	14	15	17	17	19	15	18	12
Coaches	23	18	11	8	6	5	4	10	11	7	9	9	12	14	18	21	23	24	19	21	14
