= Koby Brea =

Dominican-American basketball player (born 2002)

No. 14 – Valley Suns
- Position: Shooting guard
- League: NBA G League

Personal information
- Born: November 6, 2002 (age 24) New York City, New York, U.S.
- Listed height: 6 ft 5 in (1.96 m)
- Listed weight: 215 lb (98 kg)

Career information
- High school: Norman Thomas (Manhattan, New York); Monsignor Scanlan (The Bronx, New York)
- College: Dayton (2020–2024); Kentucky (2024–2025)
- NBA draft: 2025: 2nd round, 41st overall pick
- Drafted by: Golden State Warriors
- Playing career: 2025–present

Career history
- 2025–2026: Phoenix Suns
- 2025–2026: →Valley Suns
- 2026–present: Valley Suns

Career highlights
- 2× Atlantic 10 Sixth Man of the Year (2022, 2024)
- Stats at NBA.com
- Stats at Basketball Reference

Koby Brea (born November 6, 2002) is a Dominican-American professional basketball player for the Valley Suns of the NBA G League. He played college basketball for the Dayton Flyers and the Kentucky Wildcats. Brea was drafted by the Golden State Warriors with the 41st pick in the second round of the 2025 NBA draft.

== Early life and high school career ==
Brea was born on November 6, 2002, in New York City. His parents are both from the Dominican Republic and he was raised in Washington Heights, New York. He attended Norman Thomas High School in Manhattan as a freshman but was cut from the basketball team. He then transferred to Monsignor Scanlan High School as a sophomore and played for the junior varsity team. He then made the varsity as a junior and averaged 18 points and five rebounds per game. He was team captain as a senior and averaged 20.8 points and 7.8 rebounds while being named second-team All-New York. He committed to play college basketball for the Dayton Flyers.

== College career ==
Brea averaged 2.9 points per game as a freshman at Dayton in 2020–21 in limited playing time. In 2021–22, he averaged 8.1 points and made 42.3% of his three-point shots, being named the Atlantic 10 Conference Sixth Man of the Year. However, he learned that he suffered stress fractures in his legs following the season and opted not to have surgery, leading him to miss practice and the start of the 2022–23 season recovering. He averaged 6.8 points and 3.3 rebounds that season while appearing in 28 games. His three-point percentage dropped to 37.0% and he played through pain as the season went on, opting to get surgery following the season. He had metal rods inserted into his legs and spent several weeks in a wheelchair.

Brea returned for the 2023–24 season and appeared in all 33 games, averaging 11.1 points. He was the national leader in three-point percentage, making 49.8% of his attempts. He helped the team reach the second round of the NCAA Tournament and was named the Atlantic 10 Sixth Man of the Year for a second time, being one of only two to accomplish the feat.

Brea transferred to the Kentucky Wildcats for his final season of college basketball in 2024–25. He averaged 11.6 points per game and led the Southeastern Conference in three-point shooting at 43.5 percent.

== Professional career ==
Brea was drafted by the Golden State Warriors with the 41st pick in the second round of the 2025 NBA draft, and traded to the Phoenix Suns, in exchange for the draft rights to the 52nd (Alex Toohey) and 59th (Jahmai Mashack) picks. The trade to the Suns became official on July 6, 2025. Brea made 12 appearances for Phoenix during the 2025–26 NBA season, recording averages of 3.8 points, 0.7 rebounds, and 0.8 assists.

On July 6, 2026, Brea re–signed with the Suns on a two-way contract. On October 19, Brea was waived by the Suns.

== National team career ==
Brea was a member of the Dominican U17 basketball team in 2019, averaging 9.2 points, 4.6 rebounds, and 2.8 assists per game and competed in the U17 Centrobasket tournament.

== Career statistics ==
Legend
GP	Games played	GS	Games started	MPG	Minutes per game
FG%	Field goal percentage	3P%	3-point field goal percentage	FT%	Free throw percentage
RPG	Rebounds per game	APG	Assists per game	SPG	Steals per game
BPG	Blocks per game	PPG	Points per game	**Bold**	Career high

*	Led NCAA Division I

=== NBA ===
Year	Team	GP	GS	MPG	FG%	3P%	FT%	RPG	APG	SPG	BPG	PPG
2025–26	Phoenix	12	0	7.0	.417	.433	1.000	.7	.8	.1	.0	3.8
Career		12	0	7.0	.417	.433	1.000	.7	.8	.1	.0	3.8

=== College ===
Year	Team	GP	GS	MPG	FG%	3P%	FT%	RPG	APG	SPG	BPG	PPG
2020–21	Dayton	17	3	14.1	.400	.355	.667	1.8	.4	.1	.2	2.9
2021–22	Dayton	35	4	21.7	.436	.423	.621	2.9	.8	.4	.1	8.1
2022–23	Dayton	28	10	26.5	.363	.370	**1.000**	3.3	**1.7**	.3	**.3**	6.8
2023–24	Dayton	33	4	**29.1**	**.512**	**.498***	.875	**3.8**	1.2	**.5**	**.3**	11.1
2024–25	Kentucky	**36**	**16**	28.1	.470	.435	.914	3.2	1.3	**.5**	**.3**	**11.6**
Career		149	37	24.9	.450	.434	.802	3.1	1.1	.4	.2	8.8
