= C. J. Huntley =

American basketball player (born 2002)

No. 21 – Valley Suns
- Position: Power forward
- League: NBA G League

Personal information
- Born: January 6, 2002 (age 24) Huntersville, North Carolina, U.S.
- Listed height: 6 ft 11 in (2.11 m)
- Listed weight: 230 lb (104 kg)

Career information
- High school: Davidson Day (Davidson, North Carolina)
- College: Appalachian State (2020–2025)
- NBA draft: 2025: undrafted
- Playing career: 2025–present

Career history
- 2025–2026: Valley Suns
- 2026: Phoenix Suns
- 2026–present: Valley Suns

Career highlights
- Second-team All-Sun Belt (2025)
- Stats at NBA.com
- Stats at Basketball Reference

C. J. Huntley (born January 6, 2002) is an American professional basketball player for the Valley Suns of the NBA G League. He played college basketball for the Appalachian State Mountaineers.

== Early life and high school career ==
Huntley was born in Huntersville, North Carolina and attended Davidson Day School. In his junior year, he averaged 14 points, his team made it to the quarterfinals of the NCISSA 2A playoffs, and they finished the season 20–5.

== College career ==
In his freshman season, he played in 23 games, started in three and averaged 3.3 points. As a sophomore, he contributed 200 points, 113 rebounds, and 18 assists. He scored a career high of 20 points against South Alabama. In his junior season, he averaged 9.2 points per game, had a career high in rebounds, rebounding at least six times in seventeen games. The next season, he shot 54 percent from the field and 34 percent from behind the arch, which was a career best. On December 13, 2023, he scored a career high of 22 points against Queens. In his final season, as a graduate senior, he averaged 15.7 points per game, and became Appalachian State's thirty-seventh player to score 1,000 career points.

== Professional career ==
=== Phoenix / Valley Suns (2025–2026) ===
After going undrafted in the 2025 NBA draft, Huntley signed a two-way contract with the Phoenix Suns on June 26, 2025. He did not appear in a game before being waived by the Suns on November 17, following the signing of Jamaree Bouyea. After being waived, Huntley was added to the active roster of the Valley Suns of the NBA G League on November 20.

On March 2, 2026, Phoenix re-signed Huntley to a two-way contract, after a two-way slot was opened following Jamaree Bouyea's promotion to a standard contract. Huntley made his NBA debut with the Suns on March 22, 2026.

On October 19, 2026, Huntley was waived by the Suns.

== Career statistics ==
Legend
GP	Games played	GS	Games started	MPG	Minutes per game
FG%	Field goal percentage	3P%	3-point field goal percentage	FT%	Free throw percentage
RPG	Rebounds per game	APG	Assists per game	SPG	Steals per game
BPG	Blocks per game	PPG	Points per game	**Bold**	Career high

=== NBA ===
Year	Team	GP	GS	MPG	FG%	3P%	FT%	RPG	APG	SPG	BPG	PPG
2025–26	Phoenix	4	0	10.0	.545	.000	–	1.3	.5	.3	.0	3.0
Career		4	0	10.0	.545	.000	–	1.3	.5	.3	.0	3.0

=== College ===
Year	Team	GP	GS	MPG	FG%	3P%	FT%	RPG	APG	SPG	BPG	PPG
2020–21	Appalachian State	23	3	22.2	.381	.250	**.905**	2.2	0.3	0.3	0.4	3.3
2021–22	Appalachian State	33	18	12.0	.509	.348	.630	3.6	0.6	**0.6**	0.4	6.5
2022–23	Appalachian State	32	**31**	27.2	.465	.333	.731	5.8	0.6	**0.6**	0.7	9.2
2023–24	Appalachian State	**34**	5	22.5	**.542**	.341	.623	4.6	0.8	0.5	**0.8**	7.5
2024–25	Appalachian State	31	**31**	**33.6**	.497	**.359**	.692	**8.0**	**1.1**	**0.6**	0.7	**15.7**
Career		153	88	24.1	.493	.388	.698	5.0	0.7	0.5	0.6	8.7
