= Jamaree Bouyea =

American basketball player (born 1999)

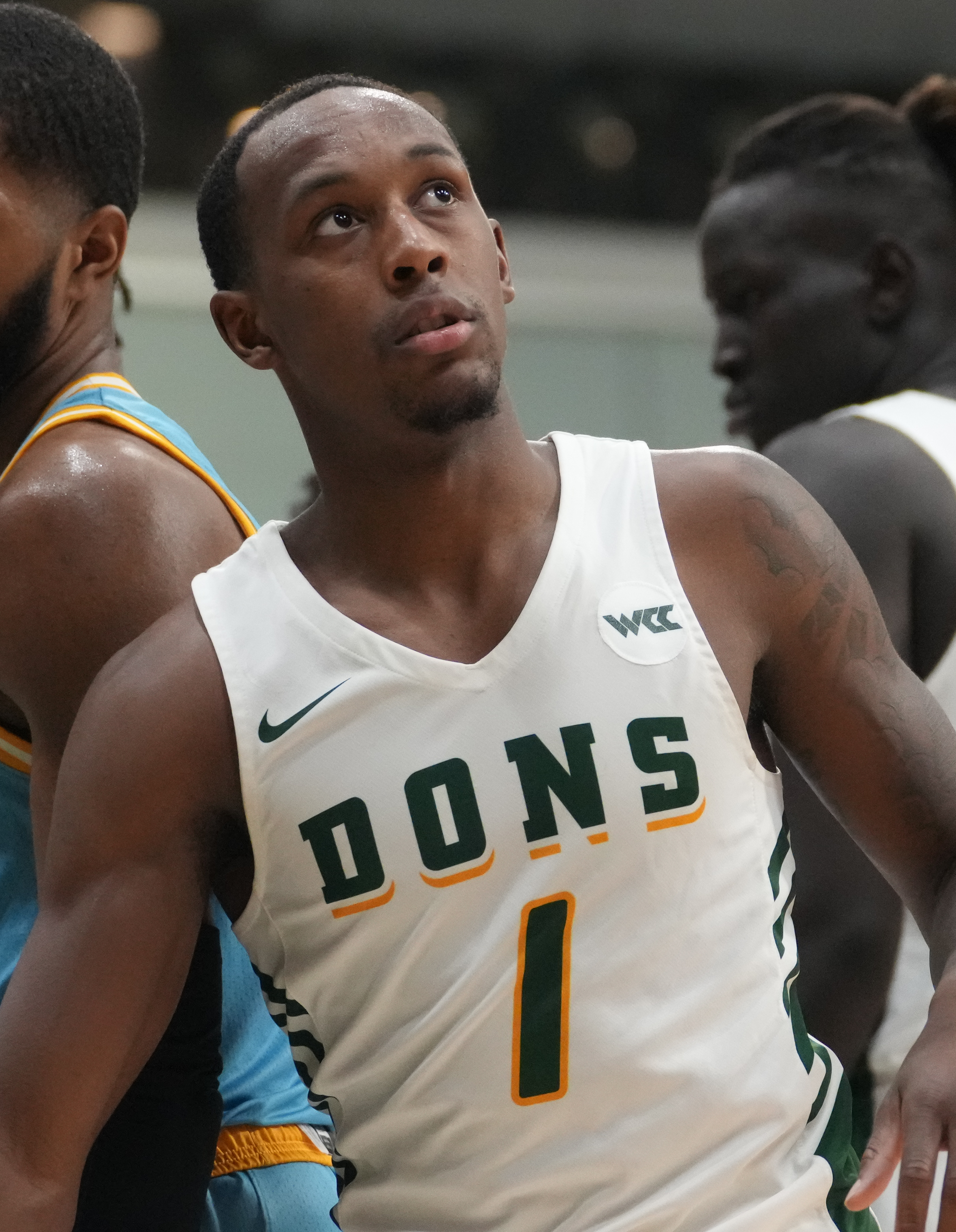
- Bouyea with San Francisco in 2021

No. 17 – Phoenix Suns
- Position: Point guard
- League: NBA

Personal information
- Born: June 27, 1999 (age 27) Seaside, California, U.S.
- Listed height: 6 ft 2 in (1.88 m)
- Listed weight: 180 lb (82 kg)

Career information
- High school: Palma (Salinas, California)
- College: San Francisco (2017–2022)
- NBA draft: 2022: undrafted
- Playing career: 2022–present

Career history
- 2022–2024: Sioux Falls Skyforce
- 2023: Miami Heat
- 2023: Washington Wizards
- 2023: Portland Trail Blazers
- 2023: →Rip City Remix
- 2024: San Antonio Spurs
- 2024: →Austin Spurs
- 2024–2025: Austin Spurs
- 2025: Milwaukee Bucks
- 2025: →Wisconsin Herd
- 2025–present: Phoenix Suns
- 2025–2026: →Valley Suns

Career highlights
- All-NBA G League Second Team (2023); NBA G League All-Rookie Team (2023); 2× First-team All-WCC (2021, 2022)
- Stats at NBA.com
- Stats at Basketball Reference

Jamaree Ray-Shaun Bouyea (born June 27, 1999) is an American professional basketball player for the Phoenix Suns of the National Basketball Association (NBA). He played college basketball for the San Francisco Dons.

== High school career ==
Bouyea played basketball for Palma School in Salinas, California. As a junior, he averaged 18 points and led his team to the Division IV state championship. In his senior season, he averaged 19.1 points and 6.1 assists per game. Bouyea became the first player in 18 seasons to repeat as The Monterey Herald All-County Player of the Year. He was lightly recruited and considered attending prep school for a fifth year. He accepted an offer from San Francisco, the only NCAA Division I program to offer him a basketball scholarship.

== College career ==
As a freshman at San Francisco, Bouyea averaged 2.5 points per game, shooting 32.7 percent from the field. In his sophomore season, he averaged 6.2 points and 3.3 rebounds per game. He became a regular starter as a junior, averaging 12.2 points, 4.4 rebounds and 3.5 assists per game, and was selected to the All-West Coast Conference (WCC) Honorable Mention. On November 27, 2020, Bouyea led San Francisco to a 61–60 upset win against No. 4 Virginia, adding 19 points and six assists. On February 18, 2021, he scored a career-high 33 points in a 68–63 loss to Loyola Marymount. As a senior, Bouyea averaged 17.3 points, 3.7 assists and 3.7 rebounds per game, earning First Team All-WCC honors. He opted to return to college for a fifth season. Bouyea was again named to the First Team All-WCC in 2022. On March 17, 2022, Bouyea scored a career-high 36 points during San Francisco's 92–87 overtime loss to Murray State during the opening round of the NCAA tournament.

== Professional career ==
=== Sioux Falls Skyforce / Miami Heat / Washington Wizards (2022–2023) ===
After going undrafted in the 2022 NBA draft, Bouyea signed with the Miami Heat on July 14, 2022. He was waived on October 13.

On October 24, 2022, Bouyea joined the Sioux Falls Skyforce training camp roster.

On February 7, 2023, Bouyea signed a 10-day contract with the Miami Heat. Bouyea made his NBA debut against the Houston Rockets on February 10 and on February 19, he was reacquired by the Skyforce.

On March 3, 2023, Bouyea signed a 10-day contract with the Washington Wizards, returning to Sioux Falls after the deal expired.

On July 1, 2023, Bouyea signed a two-way contract with the Miami Heat, but was waived on September 27. On October 30, he returned to the Skyforce.

=== Portland Trail Blazers (2023) ===
On November 12, 2023, Bouyea signed a two-way contract with the Portland Trail Blazers. However, he was waived on November 22.

=== Return to Sioux Falls (2023–2024) ===
On November 25, 2023, Bouyea returned to the Sioux Falls Skyforce.

=== San Antonio / Austin Spurs (2024–2025) ===
On March 2, 2024, Bouyea signed a two-way contract with the San Antonio Spurs, but on September 15, he was waived by the Spurs. However, he was re-signed on October 18 and waived the next day. On October 29, he rejoined Austin.

=== Milwaukee Bucks (2025) ===
On March 4, 2025, the Milwaukee Bucks announced that they had signed Bouyea to a two-way contract. He made five appearances (one start) for Milwaukee, averaging 3.4 points, 1.0 rebound, and 2.0 assists.

=== Return to Austin Spurs (2025) ===
For the 2025–26 season, Bouyea was re-signed by the Austin Spurs.

=== Phoenix / Valley Suns (2025–present) ===
On November 17, 2025, Bouyea signed with the Phoenix Suns on a two-way contract. On March 2, 2026, Bouyea signed a two-year, standard contract with Phoenix. On April 12, Bouyea recorded a career-high 27 points with nine assists, five rebounds, two blocks, and one steal in a 135–103 victory over the Oklahoma City Thunder. He made 46 appearances (including one start) for Phoenix during the 2025–26 season, recording averages of 5.7 points, 1.8 rebounds, and 1.8 assists.

== Career statistics ==
Legend
GP	Games played	GS	Games started	MPG	Minutes per game
FG%	Field goal percentage	3P%	3-point field goal percentage	FT%	Free throw percentage
RPG	Rebounds per game	APG	Assists per game	SPG	Steals per game
BPG	Blocks per game	PPG	Points per game	**Bold**	Career high

=== NBA ===
==== Regular season ====
Year	Team	GP	GS	MPG	FG%	3P%	FT%	RPG	APG	SPG	BPG	PPG
2022–23	Miami	4	0	**16.3**	.462	.400	.500	1.3	1.0	**1.0**	**.5**	3.8
2022–23	Washington	1	0	5.5	.000	.000	—	1.0	.0	.0	.0	.0
2023–24	Portland	6	0	9.5	.238	.000	—	1.7	1.3	.0	.0	1.7
2023–24	San Antonio	3	0	12.7	**.714**	**1.000**	—	**3.0**	1.0	.3	.0	3.7
2024–25	Milwaukee	5	**1**	12.4	.500	.200	.667	1.0	**2.0**	.8	.4	3.4
2025–26	Phoenix	**46**	**1**	14.0	.458	.295	**.686**	1.8	1.8	.6	.3	**5.7**
Career		65	2	13.4	.448	.276	.674	1.7	1.6	.6	.3	4.9

==== Playoffs ====
Year	Team	GP	GS	MPG	FG%	3P%	FT%	RPG	APG	SPG	BPG	PPG
2026	Phoenix	4	0	2.5	.500	—	.500	.8	.3	.3	.0	1.3
Career		4	0	2.5	.500	—	.500	.8	.3	.3	.0	1.3

=== College ===
Year	Team	GP	GS	MPG	FG%	3P%	FT%	RPG	APG	SPG	BPG	PPG
2017–18	San Francisco	**36**	10	13.3	.327	.231	.682	1.7	.9	.7	.3	2.5
2018–19	San Francisco	31	2	23.0	.467	.306	.654	3.3	1.3	.9	.5	6.2
2019–20	San Francisco	34	**34**	33.1	.492	.310	.671	4.4	3.5	1.6	.6	12.2
2020–21	San Francisco	25	25	33.7	**.500**	**.370**	.754	3.6	3.8	1.6	.2	**17.3**
2021–22	San Francisco	34	**34**	**36.2**	.470	.367	**.755**	**5.0**	**4.0**	**1.8**	**.9**	**17.3**
Career		160	105	27.5	.472	.337	.712	3.6	2.6	1.3	.5	10.7
