= Schuyler Rimmer =

American basketball player and coach

Wisconsin Herd
- Position: Head coach
- League: NBA G League

Career information
- High school: William R. Boone (Orlando, Florida)
- College: Stanford (2013–2015); Florida (2015–2017)
- NBA draft: 2017: undrafted
- Coaching career: 2018–present

Career history

Coaching
- 2018–2022: Milwaukee Bucks (video coordinator/player development)
- 2022–2024: Los Angeles Lakers (assistant)
- 2024–2025: Phoenix Suns (assistant)
- 2025–2026: Maine Celtics (assistant)
- 2026–present: Wisconsin Herd

Career highlights
- As assistant coach: NBA Cup champion (2023)

Schuyler Rimmer is an American professional basketball coach and former player who is currently the head coach of the Wisconsin Herd of the NBA G League. He played college basketball at Stanford and Florida.

== College career ==
Rimmer played at Stanford from 2013 to 2015 and Florida from 2015 to 2017.

Rimmer made his debut for Stanford on November 14, 2013, in a 71–58 win over Northwestern. Rimmer was a part of the 2013-14 Stanford Cardinal that made it to the Sweet 16 of the 2014 NCAA tournament.

After his sophomore season Rimmer transferred to the University of Florida. He recorded a college career-high nine points in a 104–54 win over North Carolina A&T on November 16, 2015.

Rimmer was a part of the 2016-17 Florida Gators that went to the Elite 8 at the 2017 NCAA tournament.

== Coaching career ==
Rimmer began his NBA coaching career in 2018 as a video coordinator and player development coach for the Milwaukee Bucks under head coach Mike Budenholzer. With the Bucks, Rimmer worked extensively with Bucks star Giannis Antetokounmpo. Rimmer won an NBA championship with the team after the Bucks won the 2021 NBA Finals.

In 2022, Rimmer joined the Los Angeles Lakers as an assistant coach under head coach Darvin Ham.

In 2024, Rimmer was hired by the Phoenix Suns as an assistant coach, reuniting with head coach Mike Budenholzer.

Rimmer spent the 2025-26 season as an assistant coach with the Maine Celtics. On August 7, 2026, it was announced that Rimmer would be returning to the Milwaukee Bucks as an assistant coach.
