= Oso Ighodaro =

American basketball player (born 2002)

No. 11 – Phoenix Suns
- Position: Center
- League: NBA

Personal information
- Born: July 14, 2002 (age 24) Mesa, Arizona, U.S.
- Listed height: 6 ft 11 in (2.11 m)
- Listed weight: 235 lb (107 kg)

Career information
- High school: Desert Vista (Phoenix, Arizona)
- College: Marquette (2020–2024)
- NBA draft: 2024: 2nd round, 40th overall pick
- Drafted by: Portland Trail Blazers
- Playing career: 2024–present

Career history
- 2024–present: Phoenix Suns
- 2025: →Valley Suns

Career highlights
- 2× Second-team All-Big East (2023, 2024); Second-team Academic All-American (2024)
- Stats at NBA.com
- Stats at Basketball Reference

Osasere Benjamin "Oso" Ighodaro (born July 14, 2002) is an American professional basketball player for the Phoenix Suns of the National Basketball Association (NBA). He played college basketball for the Marquette Golden Eagles.

== Early life and high school career ==
Born in Mesa, Arizona, Ighodaro grew up in Chandler and attended Desert Vista High School. He averaged 10 points, six rebounds and 2.2 blocks per game as a junior. Ighodaro was rated a four-star recruit and committed to playing college basketball for Marquette over offers from Stanford, Texas and Vanderbilt.

== College career ==
Ighodaro played in five games during his true freshman season with the Marquette Golden Eagles before suffering an injury and using a medical redshirt. He played in all 32 of Marquette's games and averaged 5.5 points per game during his redshirt freshman season. Ighodaro spent the following summer practicing to improve his passing and ball handling skills at the recommendation of coach Shaka Smart so that he could be a better fit in the Golden Eagles' starting lineup. As a redshirt sophomore he was named second team All-Big East Conference after averaging 11.4 points, a team-high 5.9 rebounds, 3.3 assists and 1.5 blocks per game.

== Professional career ==
On June 27, 2024, Ighodaro was selected with the 40th overall pick by the Portland Trail Blazers in the 2024 NBA draft; however, immediately on draft night, he was traded to the Phoenix Suns. On July 4, he signed with the Suns. Ighodaro would make his NBA debut on October 24, recording two points, six rebounds and a block in over twelve minutes of play in the Suns' 116–113 overtime win over the Los Angeles Clippers held in the Clippers' new home arena, Intuit Dome. On January 28, 2025, he was assigned to the Valley Suns of the NBA G League, being recalled the next day, following a double-double performance of 18 points and 18 rebounds in a win over the Salt Lake City Stars.

Ighodaro played in all 82 games (including 24 starts) for Phoenix during the 2025–26 season, recording averages of 6.5 points, 5.1 rebounds, and 2.3 assists.

== Career statistics ==
Legend
GP	Games played	GS	Games started	MPG	Minutes per game
FG%	Field goal percentage	3P%	3-point field goal percentage	FT%	Free throw percentage
RPG	Rebounds per game	APG	Assists per game	SPG	Steals per game
BPG	Blocks per game	PPG	Points per game	**Bold**	Career high
*	Led the league

=== NBA ===
==== Regular season ====
Year	Team	GP	GS	MPG	FG%	3P%	FT%	RPG	APG	SPG	BPG	PPG
2024–25	Phoenix	61	6	17.1	.604	.000	**.580**	3.6	1.2	.5	.5	4.2
2025–26	Phoenix	**82***	**24**	**22.0**	**.653**	.000	.453	**5.1**	**2.3**	**.9**	**.7**	**6.5**
Career		143	30	20.0	.637	.000	.491	4.5	1.8	.7	.6	5.5

==== Playoffs ====
Year	Team	GP	GS	MPG	FG%	3P%	FT%	RPG	APG	SPG	BPG	PPG
2026	Phoenix	4	4	32.3	.542	–	.667	7.0	4.0	.5	.8	7.5
Career		4	4	32.3	.542	–	.667	7.0	4.0	.5	.8	7.5

=== College ===
Year	Team	GP	GS	MPG	FG%	3P%	FT%	RPG	APG	SPG	BPG	PPG
2020–21	Marquette	5	0	7.6	**.750**	—	.000	1.2	.4	.2	.2	1.2
2021–22	Marquette	32	0	18.2	.676	—	**.738**	3.3	.9	.6	.9	5.5
2022–23	Marquette	**36**	**36**	31.1	.660	—	.541	5.9	**3.3**	.9	**1.5**	11.4
2023–24	Marquette	**36**	**36**	**32.5**	.576	.000	.623	**6.9**	2.9	**1.1**	1.3	**13.4**
Career		109	72	26.7	.624	.000	.616	5.3	2.3	.8	1.2	9.9

== Personal life ==
Ighodaro is of Nigerian descent. Despite growing up in the state of Arizona, he was not a fan of the Phoenix Suns at the time due to their poor play throughout the 2010s.
