= Chaisson Allen =

American basketball player (born 1989)

Phoenix Suns
- Title: Assistant coach
- League: National Basketball Association

Personal information
- Born: June 1, 1989 (age 37) Nashville, Tennessee, U.S.
- Listed height: 6 ft 4 in (1.93 m)
- Listed weight: 190 lb (86 kg)

Career information
- High school: Oakland (Murfreesboro, Tennessee)
- College: Northeastern (2007–2011)
- NBA draft: 2011: undrafted
- Playing career: 2011–2016
- Position: Point guard / shooting guard
- Coaching career: 2016–present

Career history

Playing
- 2011–2012: Galil Gilboa
- 2012: Pinar Karsiyaka
- 2012–2013: KK Zadar
- 2013–2014: Siarka Tarnobrzeg
- 2014–2015: Rethymno
- 2015–2016: AZS Koszalin

Coaching
- 2016–2018: Miami (Florida) (Player Dev.)
- 2018–2019: Capital City Go-Go (assistant)
- 2019–2020: Wisconsin Herd (assistant)
- 2020–2021: Long Island Nets (assistant)
- 2021–2023: Wisconsin Herd
- 2024–present: Phoenix Suns (assistant)

Career highlights
- 2× First-team All-CAA (2010, 2011); 3× CAA All-Defensive Team (2009–2011); CAA All-Rookie Team (2008)

Chaisson Stewart Allen (born June 1, 1989) is an American former professional basketball player and current assistant coach for the Phoenix Suns of the National Basketball Association (NBA). Originally from Nashville, Tennessee, he stands at 6 ft 4 in (1.93 m) tall and played as a point guard / shooting guard.

== College career ==
Born in Nashville, Tennessee, Allen graduated from Northeastern University in Boston, Massachusetts in 2011 and holds a place in the Hall of Fame.

2007–08: Allen started all 31 games in his rookie campaign, averaging 9.2 points, 4.6 rebounds, 3.5 assists and 2.0 steals. As a stand out freshman, Allen led the Huskies in assists and steals and was second in rebounds. His 63 steals were seventh most in a season in Northeastern University history.

2008–09: He started all 32 games at point guard during his sophomore campaign, averaging 10.4 points, 5.2 rebounds and 3.1 assists. Allen would led the team in rebounds, steals, assists for the season, while finishing in the top 10 in the CAA in assists, free throw shooting, steals, assist/turnover ratio and minutes played. He was named to the CAA All-Defensive team.

2009–10: Allen was named first-team All-CAA and first-team NABC All-District 10 for his efforts on the year. Additional accolades on the year included being selected to the CAA All-Defensive team, receiving the 2010 recipient of the Reggie Lewis Athletic Award, given by the Northeastern University John D. O'Bryant African-American Institute and being named Collegehoops.net Mid-Major All-America honorable mention. Allen became the 30th player in Northeastern history to score 1,000 points after scoring 23 pts, in addition to six rebounds and four steals, in a win over UNC Wilmington on Feb. 16, 2010.

2010–11: Started all 29 games in which he appeared, earning first-team All-CAA honors and a place on the NABC All-District 10 second team. He was named to the CAA All-Defensive Team for the third straight season and led the Huskies in points (16.7 ppg), rebounds (6.1 ppg), assists (3.7 apg) and steals (2.1 spg). His 61 steals on the season ranked second in the CAA and allowed Allen to finish his career with 232 steals, second-most in Northeastern history and fifth-most in CAA history. Allen scored 20+ points in five straight games from Jan. 26-Feb. 9 on the season, becoming the first Husky to do that since Jose Juan Barea in 2006.

== Professional career ==
Following his graduation, Allen played professional basketball in multiple European countries, including Israel (Galil Gilboa in the Israeli Basketball Premier League), Turkey (Pinar Karsiyaka), Croatia (KK Zadar), Greece (Rethymno Cretan Kings B.C.), and Poland (Siarka Tarnobrzeg, AZS Koszalin).

== Coaching career ==
On May 1, 2016, after stints in numerous Euro basketball leagues and a season-ending injury, Allen was hired by the University of Miami to be a player development assistant in the Atlantic Coast Conference. On September 1, 2018, Allen joined the Capital City Go-Go as an assistant coach in the inaugural season of the Washington Wizards' G League franchise. During his first and only season coaching the Go-Go squad, he assisted in tying a G League expansion team best record of 25–25.

On September 24, 2019, Allen was announced as the assistant coach for Wisconsin Herd. The Herd finished the shortened season as the leagues best at 33–10. Allen served as head coach for two games during the 2019–20 season and went 2–0. Allen helped the Herd set records in both games, most assist in a Herd contest (36) and most points in a quarter (47). He was named the head coach of the Herd in 2021. He later remained as the Herd's head coach until 2023.

On May 31, 2024, it was reported that Allen would be hired as an assistant coach for the Phoenix Suns in the NBA under Mike Budenholzer's new coaching staff. Despite Budenholzer later being fired after one disappointing season with the team, Allen would end up being the only holdover from Budenholzer's coaching staff to return for the 2025–26 season.

== Personal life ==
Allen is the younger brother of former University of Tennessee and San Francisco 49er football player Mikki Allen. His brother now serves as the athletic director at Tennessee State University.
