= Jesse Mermuys =

American basketball coach (born 1980)

Phoenix Suns
- Position: Assistant coach
- League: NBA

Personal information
- Born: May 1980 (age 46)

Career information
- High school: Salpointe Catholic (Tucson, Arizona)
- College: Arizona
- Coaching career: 2001–present

Career history

Coaching
- 2001–2004: Salpointe Catholic HS (assistant)
- 2004–2005: Pima CC (assistant)
- 2005–2006: Southern Utah (assistant)
- 2006–2008: Arizona (director of operations)
- 2008–2012: Denver Nuggets (assistant)
- 2012–2013: Houston Rockets (assistant)
- 2013–2016: Toronto Raptors (assistant)
- 2015–2016: Raptors 905
- 2016–2019: Los Angeles Lakers (assistant)
- 2019–2021: Sacramento Kings (assistant)
- 2021–2025: Orlando Magic (assistant)
- 2025–present: Phoenix Suns (assistant)

Jesse Mermuys (/ˈmɜːrməs/ MUR-məs; born c. 1981) is an American basketball coach who is currently an assistant coach for the Phoenix Suns of the National Basketball Association NBA. He is a former assistant coach for the Sacramento Kings, Houston Rockets, and Toronto Raptors.

== Coaching career ==
=== Denver Nuggets ===
Mermuys spent four seasons with the Nuggets as assistant video coordinator. He spent some time as the advance scout for the team.

=== Toronto Raptors ===
Mermuys was hired by Dwane Casey (the head coach) to serve under him. Mermuys began his tenure as assistant coach in the 2013–14 NBA season.

=== Raptors 905 ===
On July 7, 2015, Mermuys was named the head coach and assistant general manager for Raptors 905 of the NBA D-League.

=== Los Angeles Lakers ===
On July 1, 2016, Mermuys was hired as an assistant coach for the Los Angeles Lakers.

=== Sacramento Kings ===
On June 14, 2019, Mermuys joined the Sacramento Kings as an assistant coach.

=== Orlando Magic ===
On August 8, 2021, Mermuys joined the Orlando Magic as an assistant coach.

=== Phoenix Suns ===
On July 10, 2025, the Phoenix Suns hired Mermuys as part of their coaching staff under head coach Jordan Ott.
