= Collin Chandler =

American basketball player

No. 5 – BYU Cougars
- Position: Shooting guard
- Conference: Big 12 Conference

Personal information
- Born: February 9, 2004 (age 22) Cleveland, Ohio, U.S.
- Listed height: 6 ft 5 in (1.96 m)
- Listed weight: 202 lb (92 kg)

Career information
- High school: Farmington (Farmington, Utah)
- College: Kentucky (2024–2026); BYU (2026–present)

Career highlights
- Utah Mr. Basketball (2022)

Collin Chandler (born February 9, 2004) is an American college basketball player for the BYU Cougars of the Big 12 Conference. He previously played for the Kentucky Wildcats.

== Early life and high school ==
Chandler grew up in Farmington, Utah and attended Farmington High School. He averaged 22.6 points, 5.0 rebounds, and 1.5 steals per game during his junior season. As a senior, Chandler was named Utah Mr. Basketball after averaging 21.7 points, 4.3 rebounds, and 2.8 assists per game.

Chandler was rated a four-star recruit and committed college basketball for head coach Mark Pope at BYU over offers from Utah, Arizona, Stanford, and Utah State. He was the highest rated recruit to commit to BYU since Eric Mika in 2013 and was expected to enroll in 2024 after completing a two-year LDS mission.

== College career ==
After graduating from high school, Chandler served a two-year Latter-Day Saint mission in Sierra Leone. Shortly before he was set to return from his mission he flipped his commitment to Kentucky, who had recently hired Mark Pope away from BYU. Chandler enrolled at the University of Kentucky in June 2024 in order to take part in the Wildcats' summer practices. He played in 30 games, all off the bench, and averaged 2.7 points per game during his freshman season.

Chandler entered his sophomore season as the Wildcats' starting point guard due to an injury to projected starter Jaland Lowe. He averaged 9.7 points and 2.8 rebounds per game and shot 41% from three-point range. Following the season Chandler opted to transfer to BYU.
