= Jordan Ott =

American basketball coach (born 1985)

Phoenix Suns
- Position: Head coach
- League: NBA

Personal information
- Born: March 1, 1985 (age 41) McConnellsburg, Pennsylvania, U.S.

Career information
- High school: McConnellsburg (McConnellsburg, Pennsylvania)
- College: Penn State; Michigan State
- Coaching career: 2016–present

Career history

Coaching
- 2016–2022: Brooklyn Nets (assistant)
- 2022–2024: Los Angeles Lakers (assistant)
- 2024–2025: Cleveland Cavaliers (assistant)
- 2025–present: Phoenix Suns

Career highlights
- As assistant coach: NBA Cup champion (2023); NBA All-Star Game head coach (2025)

Jordan Ott (born March 1, 1985) is an American professional basketball coach who is the head coach for the Phoenix Suns of the National Basketball Association (NBA). He was previously an assistant coach for the Brooklyn Nets, Los Angeles Lakers and Cleveland Cavaliers.

== Early life ==
Ott is a native of McConnellsburg, Pennsylvania. He played basketball at McConnellsburg High School and graduated in 2003. Ott has a bachelor's degree in sports management from Penn State University and a master's degree from Michigan State University.

== Coaching career ==
=== Penn State Nittany Lions (2004–2007) ===
During his time at Penn State University, Ott began his career as a student manager under head coach Ed DeChellis while working on his bachelor's degree.

=== Michigan State Spartans (2008–2013) ===
After graduating from Penn State, he would go to Michigan State University and work for head coach Tom Izzo to help further his role in sports management when Penn State didn't have a master's degree plan for his role he wanted at that time. While working on his master's degree, Ott spent his first two years there working as a graduate assistant for the men's basketball team before being given the role of a video coordinator for the rest of his time there up until 2013.

=== Atlanta Hawks (2013–2016) ===
Ott began his NBA coaching career as a video coordinator with the Atlanta Hawks in 2013, under head coach Mike Budenholzer.

=== Brooklyn Nets (2016–2022) ===
In 2016, Ott was hired as an assistant coach with the Brooklyn Nets and worked with the Nets until 2022 under head coaches Kenny Atkinson, Jacque Vaughn and Steve Nash.

=== Los Angeles Lakers (2022–2024) ===
In 2022, Ott left the Nets to become an assistant coach with the Los Angeles Lakers under head coach Darvin Ham.

=== Cleveland Cavaliers (2024–2025) ===
Ott was hired by the Cleveland Cavaliers in 2024 as an assistant coach under head coach Kenny Atkinson. Ott reunited with Atkinson after being an assistant under him in Brooklyn.

=== Phoenix Suns (2025–present) ===
On June 6, 2025, Ott was hired by the Phoenix Suns as their twenty-third head coach in team history. In Ott's first season with Phoenix in 2025-26, he led the Suns to a 45-37 record and an NBA playoff appearance.

== Head coaching record ==
Legend
Regular season	G	Games coached	W	Games won	L	Games lost	W–L %	Win–loss %
Playoffs	PG	Playoff games	PW	Playoff wins	PL	Playoff losses	PW–L %	Playoff win–loss %

Team	Year	G	W	L	W–L%	Finish	PG	PW	PL	PW–L%	Result
Phoenix	2025–26	82	45	37	.549	2nd in Pacific	4	0	4	.000	Lost in first round
Career		82	45	37	.549		4	0	4	.000	
