= Farmington High School (Utah) =

Public school in Utah, United States

Coordinates: 40.9662°N 111.8995°W

Location
- 548 West Glovers Lane; Farmington, Utah 84025

Information
- Type: Public, coeducational
- Established: August 2018
- Principal: Justin Whittaker
- Grades: 10–12
- Enrollment: 2,164 (2024–25)
- Color
- Mascot: Phoenix
- Website: fhs.davis.k12.ut.us

Farmington High School is a public school located in Farmington, Utah, United States. It is owned and operated by the Davis School District. The school mascot is the Phoenix. It opened during the 2018–19 school year and is the newest high school in the Davis School District.

== History ==
In the fall of 2015, a voter-approved bond of $298 million was set aside to alleviate crowding at Davis and Viewmont High Schools. After a controversial boundary drawing process and mascot name the school was completed in July 2018 under budget and on time.

Farmington opened during the 2018–19 school year. It opened as a 5A school and without seniors. The football team during the first year had an 8–2 record and finished 3rd in 5A Region 5. The Farmington Boys Basketball team finished with a 14–10 record in 5A Region 5.

== Awards ==
Farmington has won multiple theater- and basketball-related awards, in addition to the construction project that built it. It also was runner-up in the 2022 Girls' Soccer 6A State Championship game. The school also has a critically acclaimed drill team, the Nixelles, winning 5A state championships in 2020 and 2021 and 6A state championships in 2024 and 2025.

== Rivals ==
Farmington High School has a rivalry with Davis High School dating back to 2018. Every year, each school competes to win a trophy known as "the chain". The winner of the chain hangs it up in their weight room.

== Notable alumni ==
- Collin Chandler, college basketball player
- Nick Shirley, YouTuber
