= Washington Heights, New York =

- CDP
- Location in Orange County and the state of New York.

- Location within New York and the United States Washington Heights, New York (the United States)
- Coordinates: 41°28′N 74°24′W
- Country: United States
- State: New York
- County: Orange

Area
  - Total: 1.47 sq mi (3.82 km^{2})
  - Land: 1.47 sq mi (3.81 km^{2})
  - Water: 0.0039 sq mi (0.01 km^{2})
- Elevation: 666 ft (203 m)

Population (2020)
  - Total: 2,205
  - Density: 1,498.7/sq mi (578.64/km^{2})
- Time zone: UTC-5 (Eastern (EST))
  - Summer (DST): UTC-4 (EDT)
- FIPS code: 36-78421
- GNIS feature ID: 0968847

Washington Heights is a census-designated place (CDP) in Orange County, New York, United States. The population was 2,205 at the 2020 census.

Washington Heights is a contiguous suburb of the city of Middletown. The community is in the town of Wallkill.

== Geography ==
Washington Heights is located at 41°28′02″N 74°24′40″W.

According to the United States Census Bureau, the CDP has a total area of 1.5 square miles (3.9 km^{2}), all land.

== Demographics ==
As of the census of 2000, there were 1,318 people, 492 households, and 348 families living in the CDP. The population density was 874.3 inhabitants per square mile (337.6/km^{2}). There were 510 housing units at an average density of 338.3 per square mile (130.6/km^{2}). The racial makeup of the CDP was 84.60% White, 7.74% African American, 0.83% Native American, 1.52% Asian, 3.34% from other races, and 1.97% from two or more races. Hispanic or Latino of any race were 10.62% of the population.

There were 492 households, out of which 33.1% had children under the age of 18 living with them, 53.7% were married couples living together, 12.6% had a female householder with no husband present, and 29.1% were non-families. 23.2% of all households were made up of individuals, and 10.6% had someone living alone who was 65 years of age or older. The average household size was 2.68 and the average family size was 3.16.

In the CDP, the population was spread out, with 26.3% under the age of 18, 6.8% from 18 to 24, 31.3% from 25 to 44, 23.0% from 45 to 64, and 12.7% who were 65 years of age or older. The median age was 36 years. For every 100 females, there were 89.9 males. For every 100 females age 18 and over, there were 85.1 males.

The median income for a household in the CDP was $42,981, and the median income for a family was $52,125. Males had a median income of $30,813 versus $26,023 for females. The per capita income for the CDP was $17,929. About 7.4% of families and 5.3% of the population were below the poverty line, including 7.0% of those under age 18 and 5.3% of those age 65 or over.

Historical population
| Census | Pop. | Note | %± |
|---|---|---|---|
| 1990 | 1,159 | | — |
| 2000 | 1,318 | | 13.7% |
| 2010 | 1,689 | | 28.1% |
| 2020 | 2,205 | | 30.6% |
U.S. Decennial Census

== Education ==
The majority of the area is in the Middletown City School District. A small piece is in Minisink Valley Central School District.
