= Wisconsin Herd =

American basketball team in the NBA G League

- Conference: Eastern
- League: NBA G League
- Founded: 2017
- History: Wisconsin Herd; 2017–present
- Arena: Oshkosh Arena
- Location: Oshkosh, Wisconsin
- Team colors: Good Land green, Cream City cream, Great Lakes blue, black, white
- General manager: Arte Culver
- Head coach: Schuyler Rimmer
- Ownership: Milwaukee Bucks
- Affiliation: Milwaukee Bucks
- Championships: 0
- Division/conference titles: 0
- Website: wisconsin.gleague.nba.com

The Wisconsin Herd are an American professional basketball team in the NBA G League based in Oshkosh, Wisconsin. They are affiliated with the Milwaukee Bucks, and play their home games at Oshkosh Arena.

== History ==
On June 29, 2016, it was announced that the Milwaukee Bucks were seeking to purchase an expansion team in the then-NBA Development League, listing their five finalist cities as Grand Chute (near Appleton), La Crosse, Oshkosh, Racine, and Sheboygan. On August 3, it was announced that Grand Chute and La Crosse had been eliminated, with Oshkosh, Racine, and Sheboygan as the three finalists. On December 19, Oshkosh city officials identified the former site of the Buckstaff Furniture Company as the site for their arena proposal for the team, with the Fox Valley Pro Basketball group submitting a bid to the city's planning commission on January 11. The Planning Commission approved it on January 19, with the Oshkosh Common Council approving it on January 24, conditional on the Bucks choosing Oshkosh as their home.

On February 7, 2017, the Milwaukee Business Journal reported that the Bucks had chosen Oshkosh's bid, with the team making the official announcement on February 8. On June 8, the Wisconsin Herd name was announced, with the logo unveiled on June 22. On July 1, 2017, Dave Dean was named the team's general manager and the coaching staff was announced on September 22.

The team was in first place in the league during the 2019–20 season and had clinched a playoff spot when the season was curtailed by the onset of the COVID-19 pandemic in March 2020. The Herd was then one of 11 teams that opted out of participating in the single-site 2020–21 season where all league games were played at ESPN Wide World of Sports Complex near Walt Disney World Resort in Bay Lake, Florida. All Bucks' two-way players could be assigned to the Lakeland Magic. The Herd returned for the 2021–22 season with former assistant coach Chaisson Allen as the team's new head coach and Tony Bollier as general manager.

== Season-by-season ==
Season	Division	Regular season				Playoffs
Season	Division	Finish	Wins	Losses	Pct.	Playoffs
Wisconsin Herd
2017–18	Central	5th	21	29	.420	
2018–19	Central	5th	12	38	.240	
2019–20	Central	1st	33	10	.767	Season curtailed by the COVID-19 pandemic
2020–21	Opted out of single-site season					
2021–22	Eastern	14th	8	24	.250	
2022–23	Eastern	13th	11	21	.344	
2023–24	Eastern	7th	17	17	.500	
2024–25	Eastern	8th	19	15	.559	
2025–26	Eastern	16th	10	26	.278	
Regular season record			131	162	.447	
Playoff record			0	0	–	

== Current roster ==
Wisconsin Herd roster
Players

Pos.	No.	Player	Height	Weight	DOB	From
F	–	Terrence Hargrove	6 ft 4 in (1.93 m)	215 lb (98 kg)	2001-05-10	Saint Louis
G	–	Kam Jones (TW)	6 ft 4 in (1.93 m)	200 lb (91 kg)	2002-02-25	Marquette
C	55	James Lacey	6 ft 9 in (2.06 m)	240 lb (109 kg)	1996-07-12	Northern Illinois
G	3	Kira Lewis Jr.	6 ft 1 in (1.85 m)	170 lb (77 kg)	2001-04-06	Alabama
G	30	Cormac Ryan (TW)	6 ft 5 in (1.96 m)	205 lb (93 kg)	1998-10-26	North Carolina
F	33	Onno Steger	6 ft 5 in (1.96 m)	205 lb (93 kg)	1998-02-22	Western Carolina

Coaches
Head coach
- Beno Udrih
Assistant(s)
- Derrick Alston
- Keegan Brown
- Omar Mance
- Steve Ongley

Legend
- (DP) Unsigned draft pick
- (FA) Free agent
- (S) Suspended
- (P) Prospects
- (NBA) On assignment from NBA affiliate
- (TW) Two-way affiliate player
- Injured

Roster
Updated: March 3, 2026

== Head coaches ==
#	Head coach	Term	Regular season				Playoffs				Achievements
#	Head coach	Term	G	W	L	Win%	G	W	L	Win%	Achievements
1	Jordan Brady	2017–2019	100	33	67	.330	—	—	—	—	
2	Chase Buford	2019–2021	43	33	10	.767	—	—	—	—	
3	Chaisson Allen	2021–2023	64	19	45	.297	—	—	—	—	
4	Beno Udrih	2023–2026	104	46	58	.442	—	—	—	—	
5	Schuyler Rimmer	2026–present				–	—	—	—	—	

== NBA affiliates ==
- Milwaukee Bucks (2017–present)
