= 2025 NCAA Division I men's basketball championship game =

American collegiate basketball final

National championship game
Florida Gators	Houston Cougars
SEC	Big 12
(35–4)	(35–4)
65	63
Head coach: Todd Golden	Head coach: Kelvin Sampson
- AP: 3
- Coaches: 3
- AP: 2
- Coaches: 2
	1st half	2nd half	Total
Florida Gators	28	37	65
Houston Cougars	31	32	63
- Date: April 7, 2025
- Venue: Alamodome, San Antonio, Texas
- MVP: Walter Clayton Jr., Florida
- Favorite: Florida by 1.5
- Referees: Ron Groover; Terry Oglesby; Doug Sirmons
- Attendance: 66,602
- National anthem: Robert Carter

United States TV coverage
- Network: CBS
- Announcers: Ian Eagle (play-by-play); Bill Raftery and Grant Hill (analysts); Tracy Wolfson (sideline reporter); Gene Steratore (rules analyst)
- Nielsen Ratings: (18.1 million)

The 2025 NCAA Division I men's basketball championship game was the final game of the 2025 NCAA Division I men's basketball tournament. It determined the national champion for the 2024–25 NCAA Division I men's basketball season and was contested by two No. 1 seeds: the Florida Gators from the Southeastern Conference (SEC) and the Houston Cougars from the Big 12 Conference. The game was played on April 7, 2025, at the Alamodome in San Antonio, Texas. The Gators overcame a 12-point deficit late in the second half to defeat Houston, 65–63, and win their third national championship overall and their first since 2007.

Florida, the SEC regular season runners-up, won the SEC tournament and were seeded first in the NCAA West Regional. They defeated Norfolk State, two-time defending national champions UConn, Maryland, Texas Tech, and SEC rivals Auburn to reach the championship game with a record of 35–4. The Gators entered seeking their third national title in what was their fourth championship appearance. Houston finished as Big 12 regular season and tournament champions and received the top seed in the NCAA Midwest Regional; they defeated SIU Edwardsville, Gonzaga, Purdue, Tennessee, and Duke en route to the championship game. They entered with a similar 35–4 record and were seeking their first national title.

== Participants ==
=== Florida Gators ===
The Florida Gators, representing the University of Florida in Gainesville, Florida, were led by head coach Todd Golden in his third season. The Gators were ranked No. 21 in both the preseason AP Poll and the preseason Coaches Poll. They were picked to finish sixth in the preseason Southeastern Conference (SEC) media poll. David Cobb of CBS Sports predicted that the Gators would finish seventh in the conference and named Walter Clayton Jr.—a preseason all-conference first team selection—as a key returner and the "most important piece" of Florida's 2023–24 team. They also listed Will Richard and third team preseason all-conference selection Alex Condon as key returners and Florida Atlantic transfer Alijah Martin as a "high-profile" arrival. Sports Illustrated also named Clayton first team all-conference and selected Florida to finish fourth in the SEC.

The Gators opened their season with a neutral-site victory against South Florida in Jacksonville. They defeated rivals Florida State several games later to improve to 4–0, and they won the ESPN Events Invitational with defeats of Wake Forest and Wichita State later that month. After a defeat of Virginia in the ACC–SEC Challenge, prompting the Gators' first top-ten AP ranking in five seasons, they won back-to-back neutral site contests over Arizona State and North Carolina to improve to 11–0. The Gators entered conference play with a 13–0 record but suffered a loss at No. 10 Kentucky in their first SEC game, though a thirty-point upset over No. 1 Tennessee followed immediately after. The Gators lost the rematch with Tennessee, then ranked No. 8, in Knoxville roughly a month later but earned ranked wins over No. 1 Auburn, No. 22 Mississippi State, No. 12 Texas A&M, and No. 7 Alabama over the course of their remaining SEC schedule. The Gators finished the regular season with a 14–4 SEC record, earning them the No. 2 seed in the SEC tournament. In the SEC Tournament, the Gators defeated (7) Missouri, (3) Alabama, and (4) Tennessee en route to their fifth SEC tournament championship.

Florida was selected as the No. 1 seed in the NCAA Tournament West Regional and were assigned to play their first and second round games at the Lenovo Center in Raleigh, North Carolina. They defeated (16) Norfolk State, 95–69, in the first round and (8) UConn, 77–75, to advance to the regional semifinal at Chase Center in San Francisco, California. There, the Gators defeated Maryland, 87–71, to advance to the regional final, and they overcame a 10-point deficit to beat (3) Texas Tech, 84–79, to advance to their first Final Four since 2014. The Gators met SEC rival (1) Auburn, champions of the South Regional, in the Final Four. Florida won that game, 79–73, with 34 points from Clayton, to advance to the national championship. This was Florida's fourth appearance in the national championship game (2000, 2006, 2007). The Gators had won in their last two appearances in 2006 and 2007, with their sole loss coming in 2000.

=== Houston Cougars ===
The Houston Cougars, representing the University of Houston in Houston, Texas, were led by head coach Kelvin Sampson in his eleventh season. The Cougars were picked to finish second in the preseason Big 12 Conference coaches' poll and received five of the available sixteen first-place votes. CBS Sports and USA Today similarly picked them to finish second, while Sports Illustrated picked them to finish first. Among the Houston players that received preseason praise were returners LJ Cryer, a first team all-Big 12 selection and the Cougars' leading scorer the year prior, J'Wan Roberts, and Emanuel Sharp, a Sports Illustrated first team all-conference pick, as well as Oklahoma transfer Milos Uzan.

Houston began their season with mixed results; they had a 4–3 record over their first seven games, including a five-point loss to No. 11 Auburn and a pair of losses, to No. 9 Alabama and San Diego State, at the Players Era Festival. They beat Butler in the Big East–Big 12 Battle and went on to finish their non-conference schedule with an 8–3 record. The Cougars won each of their first nine Big 12 Conference games, including a double-overtime road win at No. 12 Kansas on January 25, before they suffered their first conference loss by one point to No. 22 Texas Tech in overtime. In addition to victories against No. 13 Arizona, No. 8 Iowa State, and then-unranked Kansas, Houston won the rematch against No. 10 Texas Tech on February 24 to clinch a share of the conference title and later beat Cincinnati on March 1 to clinch their second straight outright Big 12 regular season championship. In the Big 12 tournament, the Cougars defeated (16) Colorado, (4) BYU, and (3) Arizona to win the conference tournament title. The championship win against Arizona clinched Houston's fourth consecutive thirty-win season.

Houston earned a No. 1 seed in the NCAA Tournament's Midwest Regional, marking the third straight tournament in which Houston was selected as a No. 1 seed. They opened their tournament run at Intrust Bank Arena in Wichita, Kansas, against (16) SIU Edwardsville, whom they defeated by 38 points. They then defeated (8) Gonzaga in the second round to advance to the regional semifinal at Lucas Oil Stadium in Indianapolis; this was the sixth straight Sweet Sixteen for Houston and snapped Gonzaga's streak of nine in a row. The Cougars beat Purdue by two points on a layup by Uzan with 0.9 seconds remaining to reach the regional final, where they defeated Tennessee by nineteen points. The Cougars met (1) Duke, champions of the East Regional, in the Final Four, and overcame a 14-point second-half deficit to win by three points and reach their third national championship. The Cougars were 0–2 in previous championship appearances, in 1983 and 1984.

== Game summary ==
External videos
- Video highlights on YouTube
- Full game broadcast by CBS on YouTube

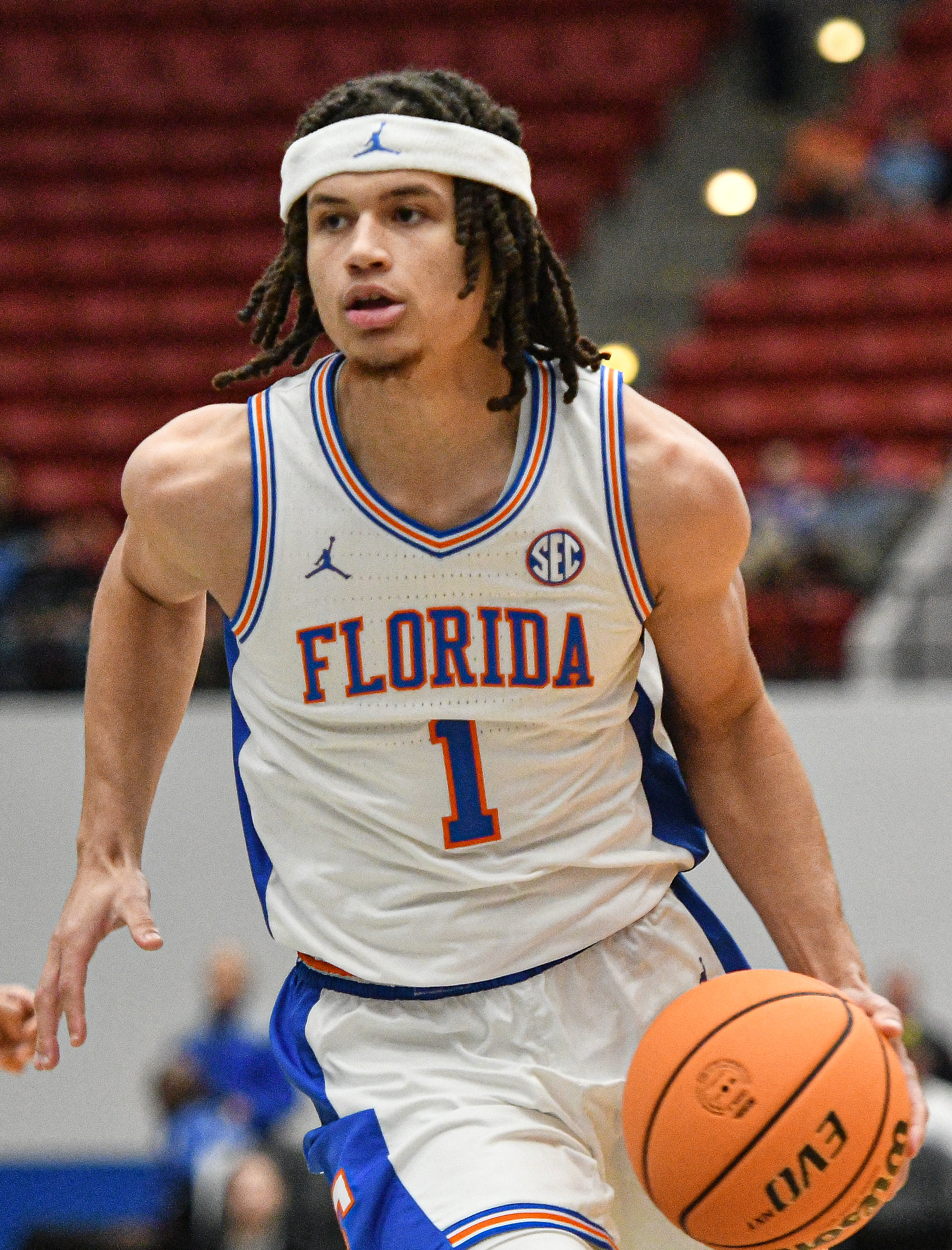
Walter Clayton Jr. (pictured in 2023) was named the Most Outstanding Player.

The game began with Houston winning the opening tip, and the Cougars scored first on a jump shot by Joseph Tugler after missed shots by both teams on their respective first possessions. The Cougars came away scoreless from their next possession despite three shot attempts, and Alex Condon scored Florida's first points of the contest on a dunk two minutes in. Condon drew Florida even at four points apiece following a Milos Uzan jumper half a minute later, and the teams traded field goals—three each—over the next four minutes with Tugler, Emanuel Sharp, and Ja'Vier Francis scoring for the Cougars and Rueben Chinyelu, Micah Handlogten, and Thomas Haugh scoring for the Gators. With the score tied at ten, Houston scored the game's next six points on field goals by Uzan, J'Wan Roberts, and Mylik Wilson to establish their largest lead to that point. Each team made two jump shots in quick succession shortly after—Will Richard twice for three points and Francis twice for two points. Alijah Martin's layup brought Florida back within two points, and another three-point jumper by Richard tied the game just over a minute later. Houston responded with an 8–0 run over the subsequent minute; Cryer began the run with a three-pointer and, after two missed Florida jumpers, the Cougars converted with a dunk and another three-pointer, both by Wilson. A Condon layup marked the last points before the media timeout with 3:41 remaining, and Richard converted a two-point jumper out of the timeout to trim the deficit to four. Each team made one final shot in the final two minutes of the half: Cryer made a two-pointer with 1:37 to play, and Richard made a three-pointer with 52 seconds remaining. This brought Houston's lead to 31–28, the halftime score. Houston's defense was a theme of the first half, as Florida recorded nine turnovers to Houston's two, and Walter Clayton Jr. was held scoreless. David Cobb of CBS Sports wrote that Florida was "fortunate" to still be in the game at halftime.

The second half began with each team making a field goal in the opening ninety seconds—Cryer on a three-point jumper and Condon on a dunk. A stretch of eight unanswered points from the Cougars followed (Uzan, Cryer, and Roberts contributed) as part of an 11–2 run to open the half. This resulted in a 42–30 Houston lead, marking Florida's largest deficit of the tournament. Additionally, Florida compiled five fouls, including a technical foul assessed on the bench, less than three minutes into the half. A dunk by Condon and free throws by Clayton narrowed the lead to eight, but Roberts and Sharp scored to put Houston ahead 45–34 with fourteen minutes to play. The Gators spent the following two minutes on an 8–0 run with field goals by Denzel Aberdeen, Martin, and Haugh. This brought Florida within three points, but a Cryer three-pointer with 11:29 put Houston back ahead by six points. A scoring drought in excess of two minutes followed, despite a pair of free throw attempts by Handlogten; the next points scored were by Aberdeen from the free throw line, making the score 48–44. Chinyelu made one of two free throw attempts for the Gators roughly thirty seconds later, and Clayton converted a three-point play (a layup, which was his first field goal, and a subsequent free throw) with under eight minutes to tie the game at 48. After a technical foul on Chinyelu, Cryer made both free throws, though the game was soon after tied at 51. The teams traded field goals on brief possessions for the following minute and a half, and Houston led 56–55 with 5:32 to play before a Sharp layup following a Florida timeout gave them a three-point lead. The Cougars maintained this lead until a Clayton three-pointer with 3:14 tied the game at 60. Martin made a pair of free throws with 46 seconds left to give Florida a one-point advantage, and another free throw by Aberdeen put Florida ahead 65–63 with 19 seconds on the clock. They forced a turnover during Houston's final possession to complete their national championship victory. In total, the Gators led for only 1:04 of the forty minutes of game time.

CBS

April 7
8:50 p.m. EDT

Recap

No. 1 Florida Gators 65, No. 1 Houston Cougars 63
Scoring by half: 28–31, 37–32
Pts: Richard – 18; Rebs: Richard – 8 Asts: Clayton Jr. – 7	Pts: Cryer – 19; Rebs: Roberts – 8 Asts: Cryer – 2

Alamodome – San Antonio, Texas
Attendance: 66,602
Referees: Ron Groover, Doug Sirmons, Terry Oglesby

Starters:			Pts	Reb	Ast
F	21	Alex Condon	12	7	0
C	9	Rueben Chinyelu	3	5	0
G	5	Will Richard	18	8	2
G	1	Walter Clayton Jr.	11	5	7
G	15	Alijah Martin	7	1	0
Reserves:					
F	10	Thomas Haugh	5	5	3
C	3	Micah Handlogten	2	4	2
G	11	Denzel Aberdeen	7	2	0
Head coach:
Todd Golden

Florida	Houston

Florida	Statistics	Houston
21/53 (40%)	Field goals	24/69 (35%)
6/24 (25%)	3-pt field goals	6/25 (24%)
17/21 (81%)	Free throws	9/14 (64%)
8	Offensive rebounds	15
32	Defensive rebounds	24
40	Total rebounds	39
14	Assists	5
13	Turnovers	9
7	Steals	5
5	Blocks	6
11	Fouls	19

Starters:			Pts	Reb	Ast
F	11	Joseph Tugler	5	4	0
G	13	J'Wan Roberts	8	8	0
G	7	Milos Uzan	6	5	1
G	21	Emanuel Sharp	8	3	1
G	4	LJ Cryer	19	6	2
Reserves:					
F	5	Ja'Vier Francis	8	6	0
G	23	Terrance Arceneaux	0	1	0
G	8	Mylik Wilson	9	2	1
Head coach:
Kelvin Sampson

== Media coverage ==
The championship game was televised in the United States by CBS. Ian Eagle provided play-by-play, while Bill Raftery and Grant Hill both provided color commentary. Tracy Wolfson was the sideline reporter.

== Aftermath ==
Walter Clayton Jr. of Florida was named Most Outstanding Player (MOP). Florida's victory marked the first men's national title for the SEC since 2012, when Kentucky defeated Kansas, 67–59.

== See also ==
- 2025 NCAA Division I women's basketball championship game
