= Isaiah Brown (basketball) =

Puerto Rican basketball player (born 2006)

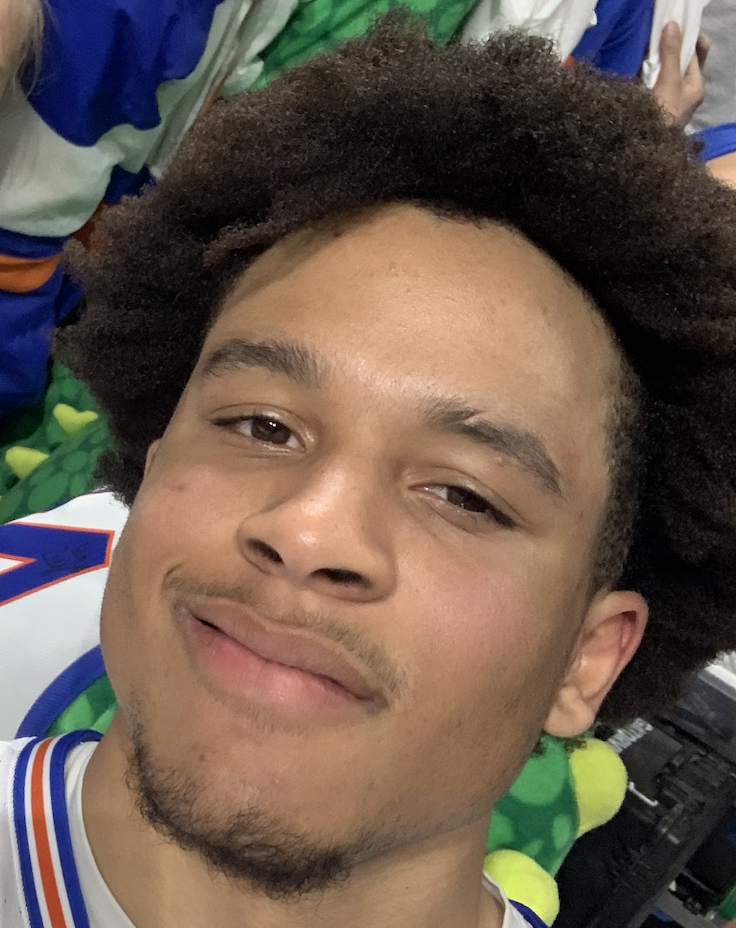
- Photo of Isaiah Brown

No. 20 – Florida Gators
- Position: Shooting guard
- Conference: Southeastern Conference

Personal information
- Born: January 17, 2006 (age 20)
- Listed height: 6 ft 4 in (1.93 m)
- Listed weight: 210 lb (95 kg)

Career information
- High school: Orlando Christian Prep (Orlando, Florida)
- College: Florida (2024–present)

Career highlights
- NCAA champion (2025)

Isaiah Emanuel Brown (born January 17, 2006) is a Puerto Rican college basketball player for the Florida Gators of the Southeastern Conference.

== Early life ==
Isaiah Brown was born in Orlando, Florida to Ron and Sheraida Brown. He has three siblings, including AJ Brown who he would later play with at Florida.

Brown played for Orlando Christian Prep, developing into a good prospect. He averaged 18.6 points per game during his junior year, drawing interest of strong programs. Brown held fifteen NCAA Division I offers before committing to Florida on May 14, 2023. He would later officially sign onto the program on November 8, 2023, before joining them ahead of his freshman season in 2024.

Brown also played at the 2024 FIBA U18 Americas Championship and 2023 Centrobasket U17 Championship for Puerto Rico.

College recruiting information
Name	Hometown	School	Height	Weight	Commit date
Isaiah Brown; SG	Orlando, FL	Orlando Christian Prep	6 ft 4 in (1.93 m)	210 lb (95 kg)	Aug 12, 2024
Isaiah Brown; SG	Recruit ratings: Rivals: 247Sports: ESPN: (81)				
Overall recruit ranking: Rivals: 112 247Sports: 125 ESPN: N/A
Note: In many cases, Scout, Rivals, 247Sports, On3, and ESPN may conflict in their listings of height and weight.; In these cases, the average was taken. ESPN grades are on a 100-point scale.; Sources:

== College career ==
Brown joined Florida as a freshman, and in his first season was used mostly in a bench role. Brown had to fight for minutes considering the Gators having one of the strongest backcourts in the country with Walter Clayton Jr., Alijah Martin, and Will Richard. The Gators went on to win the 2025 national championship, with Brown contributing in a rotational role and playing in several games during the tournament.

In 2025, Brown once again had to fight for his role in the team, as transfers such as Xaivian Lee, Boogie Fland, and Brown's brother AJ filled the backcourt. However, Brown saw significantly more playing time and saw his role increase to regularly being the second man off the bench.

== Career statistics ==
Legend
GP	Games played	GS	Games started	MPG	Minutes per game
FG%	Field goal percentage	3P%	3-point field goal percentage	FT%	Free throw percentage
RPG	Rebounds per game	APG	Assists per game	SPG	Steals per game
BPG	Blocks per game	PPG	Points per game	**Bold**	Career high

=== College ===
Year	Team	GP	GS	MPG	FG%	3P%	FT%	RPG	APG	SPG	BPG	PPG
2024–25	Florida	19	0	3.8	.520	.375	.438	0.9	0.1	0.2	0.1	1.9
2025–26	Florida	10	0	10.0	.424	.286	.700	2.4	0.5	0.3	0.4	3.9
