= 2024–25 LSU Tigers men's basketball team =

American college basketball season

2024–25 LSU Tigers men's basketball
- Conference: Southeastern Conference
- Record: 14–18 (3–15 SEC)
- Head coach: Matt McMahon (3rd season)
- Associate head coach: David Patrick
- Assistant coaches: Casey Long; Jalen Courtney-Williams; Tim Kaine; Ronrico White
- Home arena: Pete Maravich Assembly Center

2024–25 Southeastern Conference men's basketball standings
	Conf.				Overall
Team	W		L	PCT	W		L	PCT
No. 4 Auburn	15	–	3	.833	32	–	6	.842
No. 1 Florida †	14	–	4	.778	36	–	4	.900
No. 6 Alabama	13	–	5	.722	28	–	9	.757
No. 5 Tennessee	12	–	6	.667	30	–	8	.789
No. 19 Texas A&M	11	–	7	.611	23	–	11	.676
No. 12 Kentucky	10	–	8	.556	24	–	12	.667
Missouri	10	–	8	.556	22	–	12	.647
No. 18 Ole Miss	10	–	8	.556	24	–	12	.667
No. 20 Arkansas	8	–	10	.444	22	–	14	.611
Mississippi State	8	–	10	.444	21	–	13	.618
Georgia	8	–	10	.444	20	–	13	.606
Vanderbilt	8	–	10	.444	20	–	13	.606
Texas	6	–	12	.333	19	–	16	.543
Oklahoma	6	–	12	.333	20	–	14	.588
LSU	3	–	15	.167	14	–	18	.438
South Carolina	2	–	16	.111	12	–	20	.375
† 2025 SEC tournament winner Rankings from AP poll

The 2024–25 LSU Tigers men's basketball team represented Louisiana State University during the 2024–25 NCAA Division I men's basketball season. The Tigers, led by third-year head coach Matt McMahon, played their home games at Pete Maravich Assembly Center located in Baton Rouge, Louisiana as members of the Southeastern Conference.

== Previous season ==
The Tigers finished the season 17–16, 9–9 in SEC Play to finish in a tie for seventh place. As the 8th seed in the SEC tournament, the Tigers were defeated in the first round by Mississippi State. The Tigers were invited to play in the 2024 National Invitation Tournament where they fell to North Texas in the first round.

== Offseason ==
=== Departures ===
Name	Number	Pos.	Height	Weight	Year	Hometown	Reason for departure
Trae Hannibal	0	G	6'2"	221	Senior	Elliott, SC	Graduated
Carlos Stewart	1	G	6'1"	193	Junior	Baton Rouge, LA	Transferred to Santa Clara
Jalen Cook	3	G	6'0"	194	Junior	Elliott, SC	Declared for 2024 NBA draft
Mwani Wilkinson	5	F	6'5"	205	Junior	Las Vegas, NV	Transferred to Little Rock
Jordan Wright	6	F	6'6"	230	Graduate Student	Baton Rouge, LA	Graduated
Will Baker	9	F	7'0"	245	Senior	Mandeville, LA	Graduated
Hunter Dean	12	F	6'10"	250	Graduate Student	Austin, TX	Graduated

=== Incoming transfers ===
Name	Number	Pos.	Height	Weight	Year	Hometown	Previous School
Jordan Sears	1	G	5'11"	185	Senior	Daytona Beach, FL	UT Martin
Dji Bailey	4	G	6'5"	195	Graduate Student	Wilson, NC	Richmond
Cam Carter	5	G	6'3"	190	Senior	Donaldsonville, LA	Kansas State

=== 2024 Recruiting class ===
College recruiting information
Name	Hometown	School	Height	Weight	Commit date
Noah Boyde; C	McCook, NE	McCook Community College (JC)	7 ft 0 in (2.13 m)	230 lb (100 kg)	May 16, 2024
Noah Boyde; C	Recruit ratings: Rivals: 247Sports: ESPN: (N/A)				
Curtis Givens III; PG	Memphis, TN	Montverde Academy	6 ft 2 in (1.88 m)	175 lb (79 kg)	Oct 9, 2023
Curtis Givens III; PG	Recruit ratings: Rivals: 247Sports: ESPN: (88)				
Robert Miller III; C	Pasadena, TX	Pasadena Memorial High School	6 ft 10 in (2.08 m)	215 lb (98 kg)	Sep 22, 2023
Robert Miller III; C	Recruit ratings: Rivals: 247Sports: ESPN: (83)				
Vyctorius Miller; SG	Claremont, CA	AZ Compass Prep	6 ft 5 in (1.96 m)	185 lb (84 kg)	Apr 4, 2024
Vyctorius Miller; SG	Recruit ratings: Rivals: 247Sports: ESPN: (88)				
Overall recruit ranking: Rivals: 13 247Sports: 14 ESPN: 10
Note: In many cases, Scout, Rivals, 247Sports, On3, and ESPN may conflict in their listings of height and weight.; In these cases, the average was taken. ESPN grades are on a 100-point scale.; Sources: "LSU 2024 Basketball Commitments". Rivals.; "2024 LSU Basketball Commits". Scout.; "ESPN". ESPN.; "Scout.com Team Recruiting Rankings". Scout.; "2024 Team Ranking". Rivals.

== Roster ==
2024–25 LSU Tigers men's basketball team
Players
Coaches

Pos.	#	Name	Height	Weight	Year	Previous school	Hometown
G	0	Vyctorius Miller	6 ft 5 in (1.96 m)	185 lb (84 kg)	Fr	AZ Compass Prep	Los Angeles, CA
G	1	Jordan Sears	5 ft 11 in (1.8 m)	185 lb (84 kg)	Sr	UT Martin	Daytona Beach, FL
G	2	Mike Williams III	6 ft 3 in (1.91 m)	180 lb (82 kg)	So	Bishop Walsh HS	Baltimore, MD
G	3	Curtis Givens III	6 ft 3 in (1.91 m)	185 lb (84 kg)	Fr	Montverde Academy	Memphis, TN
G	4	Dji Bailey	6 ft 5 in (1.96 m)	195 lb (88 kg)	GS	Richmond	Wilson, NC
G	5	Cam Carter	6 ft 3 in (1.91 m)	190 lb (86 kg)	Sr	Kansas State	Donaldsonville, LA
F	6	Robert Miller III	6 ft 10 in (2.08 m)	220 lb (100 kg)	Fr	Pasadena Memorial HS	Houston, TX
F	7	Noah Boyde	7 ft 0 in (2.13 m)	245 lb (111 kg)	Jr	McCook CC	Monchy, St. Lucia
F	8	Trey'Dez Green	6 ft 7 in (2.01 m)	245 lb (111 kg)	Fr	Zachary High School	Jackson, LA
F	9	Jalen Reed (injured)	6 ft 10 in (2.08 m)	240 lb (109 kg)	Jr	Southern California Academy	Jackson, MS
F	10	Daimion Collins	6 ft 9 in (2.06 m)	200 lb (91 kg)	Jr	Kentucky	Atlanta, TX
F	11	Corey Chest	6 ft 8 in (2.03 m)	220 lb (100 kg)	Fr	Link Academy	New Orleans, LA
G	14	Trace Young (W)	6 ft 3 in (1.91 m)	185 lb (84 kg)	Sr	Colorado State	Austin, TX
G	15	Tyrell Ward	6 ft 6 in (1.98 m)	195 lb (88 kg)	Jr	DeMatha Catholic High School	Washington, D.C.
F	20	Derek Fountain	6 ft 10 in (2.08 m)	220 lb (100 kg)	Sr	Mississippi State	Holly Springs, MS
G	25	Adam Benhayoune (W)	6 ft 4 in (1.93 m)	235 lb (107 kg)	Sr	Sandra Day O'Connor High School	Helotes, TX

Head coach

- Matt McMahon (Appalachian State)

Assistant coach(es)

- David Patrick (Louisiana)
- Casey Long (Chattanooga)
- Jalen Courtney-Williams (Morehead State)
- Tim Kaine (Winthrop)
- Ronrico White (Chattanooga)

Legend

- (C) Team captain
- (S) Suspended
- (I) Ineligible
- (W) Walk-on
- Injured
- Current redshirt

Roster

== Schedule and results ==
Date time, TV	Rank^{#}	Opponent^{#}	Result	Record	High points	High rebounds	High assists	Site (attendance) city, state
Exhibition
October 29, 2024*; 7:00 p.m, SECN+/ESPN+		Loyola–New Orleans	W 110–48	–	21 – Carter	9 – Tied	3 – Tied	Pete Maravich Assembly Center (1,986); Baton Rouge, LA
Non-conference regular season
November 6, 2024*; 7:00 p.m., SECN+/ESPN+		Louisiana–Monroe	W 95–60	1–0	24 – Reed	8 – Reed	3 – Tied	Pete Maravich Assembly Center (8,043); Baton Rouge, LA
November 10, 2024*; 4:00 p.m., SECN+/ESPN+		Alabama State	W 74–61	2–0	21 – Carter	7 – Bailey	5 – Sears	Pete Maravich Assembly Center (7,247); Baton Rouge, LA
November 14, 2024*; 8:00 p.m., ESPN+		at Kansas State	W 76–65	3–0	20 – Carter	13 – Chest	5 – Sears	Bramlage Coliseum (9,507); Manhattan, KS
November 19, 2024*; 7:00 p.m., SECN+/ESPN+		Charleston Southern; Greenbrier Tip-Off campus game	W 77–68	4–0	19 – V. Miller	8 – Reed	3 – Sears	Pete Maravich Assembly Center (6,442); Baton Rouge, LA
November 22, 2024*; 1:30 p.m., CBSSN		vs. Pittsburgh; Greenbrier Tip-Off Mountain Division semifinals	L 63–74	4–1	14 – Tied	8 – Chest	2 – Tied	Colonial Hall (1,112); White Sulphur Springs, WV
November 24, 2024*; 2:00 p.m., CBSSN		vs. UCF; Greenbrier Tipoff Mountain Division 3rd place game	W 109–102 ^{3OT}	5–1	25 – Sears	13 – Reed	6 – Bailey	Colonial Hall (1,112); White Sulphur Springs, WV
November 29, 2024*; 7:00 p.m., SECN+/ESPN+		Northwestern State	W 77–53	6–1	18 – Sears	10 – Chest	4 – Bailey	Pete Maravich Assembly Center (8,042); Baton Rouge, LA
December 3, 2024*; 8:00 p.m., SECN		Florida State; ACC–SEC Challenge	W 85–75	7–1	26 – Carter	10 – Chest	3 – Bailey	Pete Maravich Assembly Center (8,323); Baton Rouge, LA
December 8, 2024*; 2:00 p.m., SECN+/ESPN+		Florida Gulf Coast	W 80–71	8–1	18 – Collins	12 – Chest	5 – Carter	Pete Maravich Assembly Center (7,156); Baton Rouge, LA
December 14, 2024*; 3:00 p.m., ESPNU		vs. SMU; Compete 4 Cause Classic	L 64–74	8–2	21 – Sears	11 – Chest	6 – Carter	Comerica Center (3,479); Frisco, TX
December 17, 2024*; 8:00 p.m., SECN		Stetson	W 99–53	9–2	16 – Tied	10 – Chest	6 – Givens III	Pete Maravich Assembly Center (6,599); Baton Rouge, LA
December 22, 2024*; 2:00 p.m., SECN+/ESPN+		New Orleans	W 86–70	10–2	17 – V. Miller	11 – Carter	5 – Givens III	Pete Maravich Assembly Center (8,278); Baton Rouge, LA
December 29, 2024*; 6:00 p.m., SECN+/ESPN+		Mississippi Valley State	W 110–45	11–2	23 – Carter	6 – Tied	7 – Carter	Pete Maravich Assembly Center (8,257); Baton Rouge, LA
SEC regular season
January 4, 2025; 3:30 p.m., ESPN2		Vanderbilt	L 72–80	11–3 (0–1)	22 – Carter	5 – Tied	2 – Tied	Pete Maravich Assembly Center (8,479); Baton Rouge, LA
January 7, 2025; 8:00 p.m., SECN		at Missouri	L 67–83	11–4 (0–2)	16 – Carter	7 – Fountain	4 – Bailey	Mizzou Arena (10,367); Columbia, MO
January 11, 2025; 5:00 p.m., SECN		at No. 23 Ole Miss	L 65–77	11–5 (0–3)	16 – Carter	8 – Bailey	6 – Sears	SJB Pavilion (9,406); Oxford, MS
January 14, 2025; 8:00 p.m., SECN		Arkansas	W 78–74	12–5 (1–3)	27 – Carter	10 – Collins	3 – Sears	Pete Maravich Assembly Center (8,675); Baton Rouge, LA
January 18, 2025; 7:30 p.m., SECN		at No. 11 Texas A&M	L 57–68	12–6 (1–4)	16 – Carter	6 – Fountain	5 – Sears	Reed Arena (12,812); College Station, TX
January 25, 2025; 7:30 p.m., SECN		at No. 4 Alabama	L 73–80	12–7 (1–5)	21 – Sears	18 – Chest	6 – Sears	Coleman Coliseum (13,474); Tuscaloosa, AL
January 29, 2025; 6:00 p.m., SECN		No. 1 Auburn	L 74–87	12–8 (1–6)	24 – Carter	7 – Chest	2 – Tied	Pete Maravich Assembly Center (10,098); Baton Rouge, LA
February 1, 2025; 5:00 p.m., SECN		Texas	L 58–89	12–9 (1–7)	13 – Sears	6 – Chest	2 – Tied	Pete Maravich Assembly Center (8,395); Baton Rouge, LA
February 5, 2025; 8:00 p.m., SECN		at Georgia	L 62–81	12–10 (1–8)	11 – Sears	6 – Collins	6 – Carter	Stegeman Coliseum (7,193); Athens, GA
February 8, 2025; 7:30 p.m., SECN		No. 25 Ole Miss	L 70–72	12–11 (1–9)	16 – Carter	12 – Chest	4 – Carter	Pete Maravich Assembly Center (6,980); Baton Rouge, LA
February 12, 2025; 8:00 p.m., ESPN2		at Arkansas	L 58–70	12–12 (1–10)	16 – R. Miller III	6 – Collins	4 – Carter	Bud Walton Arena (19,200); Fayetteville, AR
February 15, 2025; 5:00 p.m., SECN		at Oklahoma	W 82–79	13–12 (2–10)	20 – Carter	5 – Tied	4 – Givens III	Lloyd Noble Center (7,961); Norman, OK
February 18, 2025; 8:00 p.m., SECN		South Carolina	W 81–67	14–12 (3–10)	17 – Carter	7 – Collins	5 – Sears	Pete Maravich Assembly Center (7,403); Baton Rouge, LA
February 22, 2025; 5:00 p.m., SECN		No. 2 Florida	L 65–79	14–13 (3–11)	19 – Miller III	10 – Miller III	5 – Bailey	Pete Maravich Assembly Center (8,569); Baton Rouge, LA
February 25, 2025; 8:00 p.m., SECN		No. 5 Tennessee	L 59–65	14–14 (3–12)	17 – V. Miller	9 – Miller III	3 – Miller III	Pete Maravich Assembly Center (8,522); Baton Rouge, LA
March 1, 2025; 2:30 p.m., SECN		at No. 24 Mississippi State	L 69–81	14–15 (3–13)	23 – Carter	6 – Bailey	3 – Bailey	Humphrey Coliseum (9,357); Starkville, MS
March 4, 2025; 6:00 p.m., ESPN2		at No. 19 Kentucky	L 64–95	14–16 (3–14)	15 – Miller III	6 – Tied	3 – Tied	Rupp Arena (21,288); Lexington, KY
March 8, 2025; 3:00 p.m., SECN		No. 22 Texas A&M	L 52–66	14–17 (3–15)	21 – Sears	5 – Carter	2 – Tied	Pete Maravich Assembly Center (6,766); Baton Rouge, LA
SEC tournament
March 12, 2025; 6:00 p.m., SECN	(15)	vs. (10) Mississippi State; First round	L 62–91	14–18	20 – Sears	6 – Carter	3 – Givens III	Bridgestone Arena; Nashville, TN
*Non-conference game. ^{#}Rankings from AP Poll. (#) Tournament seedings in parentheses. All times are in Central Time.

Schedule Source:
