= 2024–25 Vanderbilt Commodores men's basketball team =

American college basketball season

2024–25 Vanderbilt Commodores men's basketball

NCAA tournament, First Round
- Conference: Southeastern Conference
- Record: 20–13 (8–10 SEC)
- Head coach: Mark Byington (1st season)
- Assistant coaches: Rick Ray; Jon Cremins; Xavier Joyner; Matt Bucklin; Kenneth Mangrum
- Home arena: Memorial Gymnasium

2024–25 Southeastern Conference men's basketball standings
	Conf.				Overall
Team	W		L	PCT	W		L	PCT
No. 4 Auburn	15	–	3	.833	32	–	6	.842
No. 1 Florida †	14	–	4	.778	36	–	4	.900
No. 6 Alabama	13	–	5	.722	28	–	9	.757
No. 5 Tennessee	12	–	6	.667	30	–	8	.789
No. 19 Texas A&M	11	–	7	.611	23	–	11	.676
No. 12 Kentucky	10	–	8	.556	24	–	12	.667
Missouri	10	–	8	.556	22	–	12	.647
No. 18 Ole Miss	10	–	8	.556	24	–	12	.667
No. 20 Arkansas	8	–	10	.444	22	–	14	.611
Mississippi State	8	–	10	.444	21	–	13	.618
Georgia	8	–	10	.444	20	–	13	.606
Vanderbilt	8	–	10	.444	20	–	13	.606
Texas	6	–	12	.333	19	–	16	.543
Oklahoma	6	–	12	.333	20	–	14	.588
LSU	3	–	15	.167	14	–	18	.438
South Carolina	2	–	16	.111	12	–	20	.375
† 2025 SEC tournament winner Rankings from AP poll

The 2024–25 Vanderbilt Commodores men's basketball team represented Vanderbilt University during the 2024–25 NCAA Division I men's basketball season. The team was led by first-year head coach Mark Byington and played their home games at Memorial Gymnasium located in Nashville, Tennessee as a member of the Southeastern Conference.

== Previous season ==
The Commodores finished the 2023–24 season 9–23, 4–14 in SEC play, to finish in 13th place. They lost in the first round of the SEC tournament to Arkansas.

== Offseason ==
=== Departures ===
Name	Number	Pos.	Height	Weight	Year	Hometown	Reason for departure
Tyrin Lawrence	0	G	6'4"	200	Senior	Monticello, GA	Graduate transferred to Georgia
Colin Smith	1	F	6'8"	215	Sophomore	Dallas, TX	Transferred to UC Santa Barbara
Ven-Allen Lubin	2	F	6'8"	225	Sophomore	Orlando, FL	Transferred to North Carolina
Paul Lewis	3	G	6'2"	170	Sophomore	Woodbridge, VA	Transferred to UTSA
Isaiah West	4	G	6'2"	190	Freshman	Springfield, TN	Transferred to Samford
Ezra Manjon	5	G	6'0"	170	GS Senior	Antioch, CA	Graduated
Evan Taylor	12	G	6'6"	205	GS Senior	Glen Ellyn, IL	Graduated
Malik Presley	13	G/F	6'6"	185	Freshman	San Marcos, TX	Transferred to Texas
Tasos Kamateros	21	F	6'8"	240	Senior	Athens, Greece	Graduated/signed to play professionally in Greece with AEK B.C.
Jason Rivera-Torres	23	G/F	6'7"	190	Freshman	Bronx, NY	Transferred to San Francisco
Lee Dort	34	F	6'10"	255	Sophomore	McKinney, TX	Transferred to California
Carter Lang	35	F	6'9"	245	Freshman	Charlottesville, VA	Transferred to Virginia

=== Incoming transfers ===
Name	Number	Pos.	Height	Weight	Year	Hometown	Previous school
Jason Edwards	1	G	6'1"	180	(redshirt) Junior	Atlanta, GA	North Texas
MJ Collins	2	G	6'4"	195	Junior	Clover, SC	Virginia Tech
Grant Huffman	4	G	6'4"	190	GS Senior	Aurora, OH	Davidson
Tyler Nickel	5	G/F	6'7"	220	Junior	Harrisonburg, VA	Virginia Tech
A. J. Hoggard	11	G	6'4"	210	GS Senior	Coatesville, PA	Michigan State
Alex Hemenway	12	G	6'4'	192	GS Senior	Newburgh, IN	Clemson
Hollman Smith	21	G	6'0"	185	GS Senior	Falls Church, VA	James Madison
Jaylen Carey	22	F	6'8"	245	Sophomore	Davie, FL	James Madison
Chris Mañon	30	G	6'5"	209	GS Senior	New Milford, NJ	Cornell
Kijani Wright	33	F	6'9"	235	Sophomore	Los Angeles, CA	USC
Devin McGlockton	99	F	6'7"	215	(redshirt) Junior	Cumming, GA	Boston College

=== Recruiting classes ===
==== 2024 recruiting class ====
College recruiting information
Name	Hometown	School	Height	Weight	Commit date
Karris Bilal; SG	Atlanta, GA	Riverwood High School	6 ft 2 in (1.88 m)	180 lb (82 kg)	Oct 1, 2022
Karris Bilal; SG	Recruit ratings: Rivals: 247Sports: ESPN: (NR)				
Tyler Tanner; PG	Brentwood, TN	Brentwood Academy	6 ft 0 in (1.83 m)	150 lb (68 kg)	Jul 14, 2023
Tyler Tanner; PG	Recruit ratings: Rivals: 247Sports: ESPN: (NR)				
Overall recruit ranking:
Note: In many cases, Scout, Rivals, 247Sports, On3, and ESPN may conflict in their listings of height and weight.; In these cases, the average was taken. ESPN grades are on a 100-point scale.; Sources: "Vanderbilt 2024 Basketball Commitments". Rivals.; "ESPN". ESPN.; "2024 Team Ranking". Rivals.

== Roster ==
2024–25 Vanderbilt Commodores men's basketball team
Players
Coaches

Pos.	#	Name	Height	Weight	Year	Previous school	Hometown
G	0	Karris Bilal	6 ft 2 in (1.88 m)	190 lb (86 kg)	Fr	Riverwood International Charter	Bloomington, IN
G	1	Jason Edwards	6 ft 1 in (1.85 m)	175 lb (79 kg)	RS Jr	North Texas	Atlanta, GA
G	2	MJ Collins Jr.	6 ft 4 in (1.93 m)	190 lb (86 kg)	Jr	Virginia Tech	Clover, SC
G	3	Tyler Tanner	6 ft 0 in (1.83 m)	170 lb (77 kg)	Fr	Brentwood Academy	Brentwood, TN
G	4	Grant Huffman	6 ft 4 in (1.93 m)	190 lb (86 kg)	GS	Davidson	Aurora, OH
G/F	5	Tyler Nickel	6 ft 7 in (2.01 m)	220 lb (100 kg)	Jr	Virginia Tech	Harrisonburg, VA
G	7	Graham Calton (W)	6 ft 4 in (1.93 m)	225 lb (102 kg)	Sr	Charlotte Latin School	Charlotte, NC
G	10	Jordan Williams (W)	6 ft 2 in (1.88 m)	215 lb (98 kg)	RS So	Texas A&M	Houston, TX
G	11	A. J. Hoggard	6 ft 4 in (1.93 m)	220 lb (100 kg)	GS	Michigan State	Coatesville, PA
G	12	Alex Hemenway	6 ft 4 in (1.93 m)	190 lb (86 kg)	GS	Clemson	Newburgh, IN
G	15	Coleson Messer (W)	6 ft 4 in (1.93 m)	210 lb (95 kg)	So	Highland Park HS	Dallas, TX
G	21	Hollman Smith (W)	5 ft 10 in (1.78 m)	185 lb (84 kg)	GS	James Madison	Falls Church, VA
F	22	Jaylen Carey	6 ft 8 in (2.03 m)	265 lb (120 kg)	So	James Madison	Davie, FL
F	24	JaQualon Roberts	6 ft 8 in (2.03 m)	230 lb (104 kg)	So	Bloomington HS	Bloomington, IN
G	25	Miles Keeffe (W)	6 ft 5 in (1.96 m)	200 lb (91 kg)	Jr	Southern California Academy	Novato, CA
G	30	Chris Mañon	6 ft 5 in (1.96 m)	215 lb (98 kg)	GS	Cornell	New Milford, NJ
F	33	Kijani Wright	6 ft 9 in (2.06 m)	235 lb (107 kg)	Jr	USC	Los Angeles, CA
F	99	Devin McGlockton	6 ft 7 in (2.01 m)	215 lb (98 kg)	RS Jr	Boston College	Cumming, GA

Head coach

- Mark Byington (UNC Wilmington)

Assistant coach(es)

- Rick Ray (Grand View College)
- Jon Cremins (Valdosta State)
- Xavier Joyner (Husson)
- Matt Bucklin (Georgia)
- Kenneth Mangrum (North Texas)

Legend

- (C) Team captain
- (S) Suspended
- (I) Ineligible
- (W) Walk-on
- Injured
- Current redshirt

Roster

== Schedule and results ==
Date time, TV	Rank^{#}	Opponent^{#}	Result	Record	High points	High rebounds	High assists	Site (attendance) city, state
Non-conference regular season
November 4, 2024*; 7:00 p.m., SECN+/ESPN+		Maryland Eastern Shore	W 102–63	1–0	24 – McGlockton	13 – McGlockton	5 – Edwards	Memorial Gymnasium (5,011); Nashville, TN
November 10, 2024*; 12:00 p.m., SECN+/ESPN+		Southeast Missouri State	W 85–76	2–0	17 – Edwards	19 – McGlockton	4 – Hoggard	Memorial Gymnasium (5,700); Nashville, TN
November 13, 2024*; 7:00 p.m., SECN+/ESPN+		California	W 85–69	3–0	18 – McGlockton	5 – Tied	6 – Huffman	Memorial Gymnasium (5,945); Nashville, TN
November 16, 2024*; 2:00 p.m., SECN+/ESPN+		Jackson State	W 94–81	4–0	16 – Edwards	9 – Carey	4 – Edwards	Memorial Gymnasium (5,249); Nashville, TN
November 21, 2024*; 6:30 p.m., ESPNU		vs. Nevada; Charleston Classic quarterfinals	W 73–71	5–0	18 – Hoggard	8 – Tied	7 – Hoggard	TD Arena (2,291); Charleston, SC
November 22, 2024*; 4:00 p.m., ESPN2		vs. Seton Hall; Charleston Classic semifinals	W 76–60	6–0	24 – Nickel	8 – Carey	6 – Hoggard	TD Arena; Charleston, SC
November 24, 2024*; 7:30 p.m., ESPN		vs. Drake; Charleston Classic championship	L 70–89	6–1	26 – Edwards	4 – Huffman	3 – Huffman	TD Arena (2,119); Charleston, SC
November 29, 2024*; 2:00 p.m., SECN+/ESPN+		Tennessee Tech	W 87–56	7–1	23 – Edwards	14 – McGlockton	4 – Hoggard	Memorial Gymnasium (6,068); Nashville, TN
December 4, 2024*; 8:15 p.m., ACCN		at Virginia Tech; ACC–SEC Challenge	W 80–64	8–1	15 – Collins	4 – McGlockton	3 – Tied	Cassell Coliseum (4,973); Blacksburg, VA
December 8, 2024*; 11:30 a.m., ESPNU		vs. TCU; Coast-to-Coast Challenge	W 83–74	9–1	30 – Edwards	7 – McGlockton	5 – Huffman	Dickies Arena; Fort Worth, TX
December 18, 2024*; 7:00 p.m., SECN		The Citadel	W 105–53	10–1	19 – Tied	8 – McGlockton	8 – Hoggard	Memorial Gymnasium (6,317); Nashville, TN
December 21, 2024*; 2:00 p.m., SECN+/ESPN+		Austin Peay	W 85–55	11–1	16 – Edwards	9 – McGlockton	5 – Tanner	Memorial Gymnasium (7,230); Nashville, TN
December 30, 2024*; 7:00 p.m., SECN+/ESPN+		New Orleans	W 100–56	12–1	19 – Nickel	10 – McGlockton	8 – Hoggard	Memorial Gymnasium (7,302); Nashville, TN
SEC regular season
January 4, 2025; 3:30 p.m., ESPN2		at LSU	W 80–72	13–1 (1–0)	17 – Hoggard	10 – McGlockton	4 – Hoggard	Pete Maravich Assembly Center (8,479); Baton Rouge, LA
January 7, 2025; 8:00 p.m., ESPNU		No. 14 Mississippi State	L 64–76	13–2 (1–1)	18 – Hoggard	6 – Tied	3 – Hoggard	Memorial Gymnasium (8,688); Nashville, TN
January 11, 2025; 2:30 p.m., SECN		at Missouri	L 66–75	13–3 (1–2)	20 – Edwards	10 – McGlockton	6 – Hoggard	Mizzou Arena (15,061); Columbia, MO
January 15, 2025; 5:00 p.m., SECN		South Carolina	W 66–63	14–3 (2–2)	14 – Hoggard	7 – McGlockton	4 – Hoggard	Memorial Gymnasium (6,443); Nashville, TN
January 18, 2025; 2:30 p.m., SECN		No. 6 Tennessee; Rivalry	W 76–75	15–3 (3–2)	18 – Edwards	10 – Carey	6 – Hogard	Memorial Gymnasium (14,316); Nashville, TN
January 21, 2025; 6:00 p.m., SECN		at No. 4 Alabama	L 87–103	15–4 (3–3)	21 – Edwards	14 – McGlockton	4 – Hoggard	Coleman Coliseum (13,474); Tuscaloosa, AL
January 25, 2025; 1:30 p.m., ESPN		No. 9 Kentucky	W 74–69	16–4 (4–3)	18 – Edwards	6 – Tied	6 – Hoggard	Memorial Gymnasium (14,316); Nashville, TN
February 1, 2025; 2:30 p.m., SECN	No. 24	at Oklahoma	L 67–97	16–5 (4–4)	22 – McGlockton	9 – Collins Jr.	5 – Hoggard	Lloyd Noble Center (8,336); Norman, OK
February 4, 2025; 6:00 p.m., SECN		at No. 6 Florida	L 75–86	16–6 (4–5)	20 – Edwards	8 – McGlockton	6 – Hoggard	O'Connell Center (9,745); Gainesville, FL
February 8, 2025; 12:00 p.m., SECN		Texas	W 86–78	17–6 (5–5)	18 – Carey	14 – Carey	6 – Hoggard	Memorial Gymnasium (9,215); Nashville, TN
February 11, 2025; 6:00 p.m., SECN		No. 1 Auburn	L 68–80	17–7 (5–6)	13 – Edwards	13 – McGlockton	4 – Hoggard	Memorial Gymnasium (13,032); Nashville, TN
February 15, 2025; 12:00 p.m., SECN		at No. 5 Tennessee; Rivalry	L 76–81	17–8 (5–7)	24 – Edwards	7 – Carey	5 – Hoggard	Thompson–Boling Arena (21,678); Knoxville, TN
February 19, 2025; 6:00 p.m., SECN		at No. 17 Kentucky	L 61–82	17–9 (5–8)	14 – McGlockton	10 – McGlockton	4 – Hoggard	Rupp Arena (20,164); Lexington, KY
February 22, 2025; 2:30 p.m., SECN		No. 24 Ole Miss	W 77–72	18–9 (6–8)	16 – Mañon	8 – McGlockton	5 – Hoggard	Memorial Gymnasium (10,494); Nashville, TN
February 26, 2025; 6:00 p.m., SECN		at No. 12 Texas A&M	W 86–84	19–9 (7–8)	21 – Nickel	10 – McGlockton	4 – Tanner	Reed Arena (9,287); College Station, TX
March 1, 2025; 5:00 p.m., SECN		No. 14 Missouri	W 97–93 ^{OT}	20–9 (8–8)	23 – Mañon	11 – Mañon	6 – Hoggard	Memorial Gymnasium (10,311); Nashville, TN
March 4, 2025; 9:00 p.m., SECN		Arkansas	L 77–90	20–10 (8–9)	16 – Nickel	6 – Carey	7 – Hoggard	Memorial Gymnasium (8,829); Nashville, TN
March 8, 2025; 11:00 a.m., ESPNU		at Georgia	L 68–79	20–11 (8–10)	24 – Edwards	9 – Carey	5 – Hoggard	Stegeman Coliseum (10,523); Athens, GA
SEC tournament
March 12, 2025; 2:30 p.m., SECN	(12)	vs. (13) Texas; First round	L 72–79	20–12	20 – Edwards	10 – McGlockton	4 – Manon	Bridgestone Arena (13,840); Nashville, TN
NCAA tournament
March 21, 2025*; 2:15 p.m., TruTV	(10 E)	vs. (7 E) No. 20 Saint Mary's; First Round	L 56–59	20–13	18 – Edwards	7 – Tied	4 – Hoggard	Rocket Arena (15,985); Cleveland, OH
*Non-conference game. ^{#}Rankings from AP poll. (#) Tournament seedings in parentheses. E=East. All times are in Central Time.

== Rankings ==
Ranking movements Legend: ██ Increase in ranking ██ Decrease in ranking — = Not ranked RV = Received votes
	Week																				
Poll	Pre	1	2	3	4	5	6	7	8	9	10	11	12	13	14	15	16	17	18	19	Final
AP	—	—	—	RV	—	—	—	—	—	RV	—	RV	24	RV	—	—	RV	RV	—	—	—
Coaches	—	—	—	—	—	—	—	—	—	RV	—	RV	RV	RV	—	—	—	RV	—	RV	—

== See also ==
- 2024–25 Vanderbilt Commodores women's basketball team
