= 2024–25 Oklahoma Sooners men's basketball team =

2024–25 Oklahoma Sooners men's basketball

Battle 4 Atlantis champions

NCAA tournament, First Round
- Conference: Southeastern Conference
- Record: 20–14 (6–12 SEC)
- Head coach: Porter Moser (4th season)
- Assistant coaches: Armon Gates (2nd season); Ryan Humphrey (3rd season); Brock Morris (2nd season); Clayton Custer (2nd season); Josh Oppenheimer (1st season)
- Home arena: Lloyd Noble Center

2024–25 Southeastern Conference men's basketball standings
| | Conf. | | | | Overall |
| Team | W | | L | PCT | W | | L | PCT |
|---|---|---|---|---|---|---|---|---|
| No. 4 Auburn | 15 | – | 3 | .833 | 32 | – | 6 | .842 |
| No. 1 Florida † | 14 | – | 4 | .778 | 36 | – | 4 | .900 |
| No. 6 Alabama | 13 | – | 5 | .722 | 28 | – | 9 | .757 |
| No. 5 Tennessee | 12 | – | 6 | .667 | 30 | – | 8 | .789 |
| No. 19 Texas A&M | 11 | – | 7 | .611 | 23 | – | 11 | .676 |
| No. 12 Kentucky | 10 | – | 8 | .556 | 24 | – | 12 | .667 |
| Missouri | 10 | – | 8 | .556 | 22 | – | 12 | .647 |
| No. 18 Ole Miss | 10 | – | 8 | .556 | 24 | – | 12 | .667 |
| No. 20 Arkansas | 8 | – | 10 | .444 | 22 | – | 14 | .611 |
| Mississippi State | 8 | – | 10 | .444 | 21 | – | 13 | .618 |
| Georgia | 8 | – | 10 | .444 | 20 | – | 13 | .606 |
| Vanderbilt | 8 | – | 10 | .444 | 20 | – | 13 | .606 |
| Texas | 6 | – | 12 | .333 | 19 | – | 16 | .543 |
| Oklahoma | 6 | – | 12 | .333 | 20 | – | 14 | .588 |
| LSU | 3 | – | 15 | .167 | 14 | – | 18 | .438 |
| South Carolina | 2 | – | 16 | .111 | 12 | – | 20 | .375 |
† 2025 SEC tournament winner Rankings from AP poll

The 2024–25 Oklahoma Sooners men's basketball team represented the University of Oklahoma during the 2024–25 NCAA Division I men's basketball season. The Sooners, led by head coach Porter Moser in his fourth year, played their home games at Lloyd Noble Center in Norman, Oklahoma, as members of the Southeastern Conference (SEC). This was the inaugural season for Oklahoma as members of the SEC.

== Previous season ==
The Sooners finished the 2023–24 season 20–12, 8–10 in Big 12 Play to finish tied in ninth place. They were defeated by TCU in the second round of the Big 12 tournament.

== Offseason ==
=== Departures ===
==== Outgoing transfers ====
| Player | Position | Height | Weight | Year | New team |
|---|---|---|---|---|---|
| Otega Oweh | G | 6'4 | 210 | Sophomore | Kentucky |
| John Hugley | F | 6'9 | 240 | Redshirt junior | Xavier |
| Javian McCollum | G | 6'2 | 160 | Junior | Georgia Tech |
| Milos Uzan | G | 6'4 | 193 | Sophomore | Houston |
| Kaden Cooper | G | 6'5 | 180 | Freshman | Louisiana Tech |

=== Additions ===
==== Incoming transfers ====
| Player | Position | Height | Weight | Year | Former team |
|---|---|---|---|---|---|
| Kobe Elvis | G | 6'2 | 180 | Redshirt senior | Dayton |
| Jadon Jones | G | 6'5 | 185 | Senior | Long Beach State |
| Brycen Goodine | G | 6'4 | 170 | Graduate senior | Fairfield |
| Duke Miles | G | 6'2 | 170 | Senior | High Point |
| Mohammed Wague | F | 6'10 | 225 | Senior | Alabama |
| Glenn Taylor Jr. | F | 6'6 | 200 | Senior | St John's |

==== Recruiting ====
College recruiting
| Name | Hometown | School | Height | Weight | Commit date |
|---|---|---|---|---|---|
| Dayton Forsythe; PG | Dale, OK | Dale High School | 6 ft 2 in (1.88 m) | 180 lb (82 kg) | Jul 20, 2023 |
| Dayton Forsythe; PG | Recruit ratings: Rivals: 247Sports: ESPN: (79) | | | | |
| Kuol Atak; PF | Fort Worth, TX | Haltom High School | 6 ft 9 in (2.06 m) | 185 lb (84 kg) | Sep 5, 2023 |
| Kuol Atak; PF | Recruit ratings: Rivals: 247Sports: ESPN: (82) | | | | |
| Jeff Nwankwo; SF | Oklahoma City, OK | Cowley Community College | 6 ft 5 in (1.96 m) | 200 lb (91 kg) | May 15, 2024 |
| Jeff Nwankwo; SF | Recruit ratings: No ratings found | | | | |
| Jeremiah Fears; PG | Joliet, IL | Compass Prep | 6 ft 2 in (1.88 m) | 175 lb (79 kg) | Jul 20, 2024 |
| Jeremiah Fears; PG | Recruit ratings: Rivals: 247Sports: ESPN: (89) | | | | |

== Preseason ==
=== SEC media poll ===
SEC media poll
| Predicted finish | Team |
| 1 | Alabama |
| 2 | Auburn |
| 3 | Tennessee |
| 4 | Arkansas |
| 5 | Texas A&M |
| 6 | Florida |
| 7 | Texas |
| 8 | Kentucky |
| 9 | Ole Miss |
| 10 | Mississippi State |
| 11 | South Carolina |
| 12 | Georgia |
| 13 | Missouri |
| 14 | LSU |
| 15 | Oklahoma |
| 16 | Vanderbilt |

== Roster ==
2024–25 Oklahoma Sooners men's basketball team
Players
Coaches

| Pos. | # | Name | Height | Weight | Year | Previous school | Hometown |
|---|---|---|---|---|---|---|---|
| G | 0 | Jeremiah Fears | 6 ft 4 in (1.93 m) | 182 lb (83 kg) | Fr | Compass Prep | Joliet, IL |
| G | 1 | Kobe Elvis | 6 ft 1 in (1.85 m) | 180 lb (82 kg) | GS | Dayton | Brampton, ON |
| G | 2 | Brycen Goodine | 6 ft 4 in (1.93 m) | 190 lb (86 kg) | GS | Fairfield | New Bedford, MA |
| F | 3 | Jeff Nwankwo (injured) | 6 ft 6 in (1.98 m) | 220 lb (100 kg) | Jr | Cowley Community College | Oklahoma City, OK |
| F | 5 | Mohammed Wague | 6 ft 10 in (2.08 m) | 225 lb (102 kg) | GS | Alabama | Bronx, NY |
| G | 7 | Dayton Fortsythe | 6 ft 2 in (1.88 m) | 180 lb (82 kg) | Fr | Dale High School | Dale, OK |
| F | 10 | Sam Godwin | 6 ft 10 in (2.08 m) | 240 lb (109 kg) | Sr | Wofford | Ada, OK |
| F | 11 | Yaya Keita | 6 ft 9 in (2.06 m) | 241 lb (109 kg) | RS Jr | Missouri | St. Louis, MO |
| G | 12 | Jadon Jones | 6 ft 5 in (1.96 m) | 190 lb (86 kg) | GS | Long Beach | Long Beach, CA |
| F | 14 | Jalon Moore | 6 ft 7 in (2.01 m) | 215 lb (98 kg) | Sr | Georgia Tech | Birmingham, AL |
| G | 15 | Duke Miles | 6 ft 2 in (1.88 m) | 188 lb (85 kg) | RS Sr | High Point | Montgomery, AL |
| F | 22 | Kuol Atak | 6 ft 9 in (2.06 m) | 190 lb (86 kg) | Fr | Haltom High School | Fort Worth, Texas |
| F | 24 | Jacolb Fredson-Cole | 6 ft 7 in (2.01 m) | 220 lb (100 kg) | RS Fr | Link Academy | Bellaire, TX |
| G | 30 | Jake Moser (W) | 6 ft 3 in (1.91 m) | 187 lb (85 kg) | Sr | Loyola Academy | Norman, OK |
| F | 35 | Glenn Taylor Jr. | 6 ft 6 in (1.98 m) | 215 lb (98 kg) | Sr | St John's | Chandler, AZ |
| C | 45 | Luke Northweather | 6 ft 11 in (2.11 m) | 240 lb (109 kg) | RS So | Blair Oaks | Jefferson, MO |
| G | 55 | Reid Lovelace (W) | 5 ft 10 in (1.78 m) | 140 lb (64 kg) | Jr | Crossings Christian School | Oklahoma City, OK |

Head coach

- Porter Moser (Creighton)

Assistant coach(es)

- Clayton Custer (Loyola Chicago)
- Armon Gates (Kent State)
- Ryan Humphrey (Notre Dame)
- Brock Morris (Snead State)
- Josh Oppenheimer (Cal State Dominguez)

Legend

- (C) Team captain
- (S) Suspended
- (I) Ineligible
- (W) Walk-on
- Injured
- Current redshirt

Roster
Last update: July 17, 2024

== Schedule and results ==
| Date time, TV | Rank^{#} | Opponent^{#} | Result | Record | High points | High rebounds | High assists | Site (attendance) city, state |
Non-conference regular season
| November 4, 2024*; 8:00 p.m., SECN+/ESPN+ | | Lindenwood | W 93–60 | 1–0 | 22 – Moore | 15 – Godwin | 6 – Tied | Lloyd Noble Center (4,886); Norman, OK |
| November 11, 2024*; 7:00 p.m., SECN+/ESPN+ | | Northwestern State | W 73–57 | 2–0 | 23 – Moore | 10 – Godwin | 3 – Miles | Lloyd Noble Center (4,742); Norman, OK |
| November 16, 2024*; 1:00 p.m., SECN+/ESPN+ | | Stetson | W 85–64 | 3–0 | 24 – Elvis | 10 – Godwin | 6 – Elvis | Lloyd Noble Center (4,922); Norman, OK |
| November 21, 2024*; 7:00 p.m., SECN+/ESPN+ | | East Texas A&M | W 84–56 | 4–0 | 20 – Fears | 9 – Godwin | 7 – Elvis | Lloyd Noble Center (4,678); Norman, OK |
| November 27, 2024*; 4:00 p.m., ESPN2 | | vs. Providence; Battle 4 Atlantis quarterfinals | W 79–77 | 5–0 | 26 – Elvis | 6 – Goodine | 7 – Fears | Imperial Arena (801); Nassau, Bahamas |
| November 28, 2024*; 4:00 p.m., ESPN | | vs. No. 24 Arizona; Battle 4 Atlantis semifinals | W 82–77 | 6–0 | 26 – Fears | 7 – Tied | 5 – Fears | Imperial Arena (456); Nassau, Bahamas |
| November 29, 2024*; 4:30 p.m, ESPN | | vs. Louisville; Battle 4 Atlantis Championship | W 69–64 | 7–0 | 24 – Moore | 7 – Moore | 7 – Elvis | Imperial Arena (1,866); Nassau, Bahamas |
| December 3, 2024*; 8:00 p.m., ESPNU | No. 21 | Georgia Tech; ACC–SEC Challenge | W 76–61 | 8–0 | 18 – Fears | 11 – Moore | 3 – Fears | Lloyd Noble Center (7,725); Norman, OK |
| December 7, 2024*; 7:00 p.m., SECN+/ESPN+ | No. 21 | Alcorn State | W 94–78 | 9–0 | 20 – Moore | 6 – Wague | 7 – Tied | McCasland Field House (1,611); Norman, OK |
| December 14, 2024*; 7:00 p.m., ESPNU | No. 13 | vs. Oklahoma State; Bedlam Series | W 80–65 | 10–0 | 20 – Godwin | 14 – Godwin | 5 – Fears | Paycom Center (10,300); Oklahoma City, OK |
| December 18, 2024*; 8:00 p.m., ESPN2 | No. 14 | vs. No. 24 Michigan; Jumpman Invitational | W 87–86 | 11–0 | 30 – Fears | 7 – Godwin | 4 – Fears | Spectrum Center (5,859); Charlotte, NC |
| December 22, 2024*; 12:00 p.m., SECN+/ESPN+ | No. 14 | Central Arkansas | W 89–66 | 12–0 | 29 – Miles | 7 – Tied | 5 – Fears | Lloyd Noble Center (6,244); Norman, OK |
| December 29, 2024*; 1:00 p.m., SECN+/ESPN+ | No. 12 | Prairie View A&M | W 89–67 | 13–0 | 22 – Moore | 7 – Goodine | 3 – Godwin | Lloyd Noble Center (6,876); Norman, OK |
SEC regular season
| January 4, 2025; 5:00 p.m., SECN | No. 12 | at No. 5 Alabama | L 79–107 | 13–1 (0–1) | 20 – Moore | 7 – Moore | 5 – Elvis | Coleman Coliseum (13,474); Tuscaloosa, AL |
| January 8, 2025; 8:00 p.m., SECN | No. 17 | No. 10 Texas A&M | L 78–80 | 13–2 (0–2) | 34 – Goodline | 6 – Godwin | 8 – Elvis | Lloyd Noble Center (7,604); Norman, OK |
| January 11, 2025; 5:00 p.m., ESPN2 | No. 17 | at Georgia | L 62–72 | 13–3 (0–3) | 17 – Moore | 9 – Moore | 5 – Tied | Stegeman Coliseum (10,523); Athens, GA |
| January 15, 2025; 9:00 p.m., SECN | | Texas | L 73–77 | 13–4 (0–4) | 29 – Moore | 8 – Moore | 3 – Taylor Jr. | Lloyd Noble Center (10,436); Norman, OK |
| January 18, 2025; 3:00 p.m., ESPNU | | South Carolina | W 82–62 | 14–4 (1–4) | 22 – Moore | 9 – Fears | 8 – Fears | Lloyd Noble Center (7,264); Norman, OK |
| January 25, 2025; 7:30 p.m., ESPN2 | | at Arkansas | W 65–62 | 15–4 (2–4) | 16 – Fears | 7 – Miles | 3 – Tied | Bud Walton Arena (19,200); Fayetteville, AR |
| January 28, 2025; 8:00 p.m., SECN | | at No. 13 Texas A&M | L 68–75 | 15–5 (2–5) | 24 – Goodine | 4 – Forsythe | 4 – Miles | Reed Arena (9,379); College Station, TX |
| February 1, 2025; 2:30 p.m., SECN | | No. 24 Vanderbilt | W 97–67 | 16–5 (3–5) | 21 – Fears | 8 – Taylor Jr. | 4 – Tied | Lloyd Noble Center (8,336); Norman, OK |
| February 4, 2025; 8:00 p.m., SECN | | at No. 1 Auburn | L 70–98 | 16–6 (3–6) | 13 – Forsythe | 6 – Northweather | 3 – Fears | Neville Arena (9,121); Auburn, AL |
| February 8, 2025; 11:00 a.m., ESPN | | No. 4 Tennessee | L 52–70 | 16–7 (3–7) | 12 – Moore | 6 – Godwin | 2 – Tied | Lloyd Noble Center (10,162); Norman, OK |
| February 12, 2025; 8:00 p.m., SECN | | at No. 21 Missouri | L 58–82 | 16–8 (3–8) | 18 – Miles | 7 – Tied | 3 – Miles | Mizzou Arena (12,403); Columbia, MO |
| February 15, 2025; 5:00 p.m., SECN | | LSU | L 79–82 | 16–9 (3–9) | 15 – Fears | 7 – Tied | 3 – Miles | Lloyd Noble Center (7,961); Norman, OK |
| February 18, 2025; 6:00 p.m., ESPN2 | | at No. 2 Florida | L 63–85 | 16–10 (3–10) | 22 – Fears | 6 – Tied | 2 – Tied | O'Connell Center (10,513); Gainesville, FL |
| February 22, 2025; 12:00 p.m., SECN | | No. 21 Mississippi State | W 93–87 | 17–10 (4–10) | 27 – Fears | 10 – Godwin | 10 – Fears | Lloyd Noble Center (7,140); Norman, OK |
| February 26, 2025; 8:00 p.m., SECN | | No. 17 Kentucky | L 82–83 | 17–11 (4–11) | 20 – Moore | 8 – Fears | 6 – Fears | Lloyd Noble Center (10,162); Norman, OK |
| March 1, 2025; 1:00 p.m., ESPN2 | | at Ole Miss | L 84–87 | 17–12 (4–12) | 25 – Forsythe | 5 – Tied | 7 – Fears | SJB Pavilion (8,007); Oxford, MS |
| March 5, 2025; 7:00 p.m., SECN+/ESPN+ | | No. 15 Missouri | W 96–84 | 18–12 (5–12) | 31 – Fears | 7 – Moore | 5 – Fears | Lloyd Noble Center (7,317); Norman, OK |
| March 8, 2025; 7:00 p.m., SECN | | at Texas | W 76–72 | 19–12 (6–12) | 14 – Goodine | 7 – Moore | 5 – Elvis | Moody Center (11,121); Austin, TX |
SEC tournament
| March 12, 2025; 8:30 p.m., SECN | (14) | vs. (11) Georgia; First round | W 81–75 | 20–12 | 29 – Fears | 9 – Wague | 4 – Wague | Bridgestone Arena; Nashville, TN |
| March 13, 2025; 8:30 p.m., SECN | (14) | vs. (6) Kentucky; Second round | L 84–85 | 20–13 | 28 – Fears | 7 – Moore | 5 – Fears | Bridgestone Arena (16,347); Nashville, TN |
NCAA tournament
| March 21, 2025*; 8:25 p.m., TNT | (9 W) | vs. (8 W) UConn; First round | L 59–67 | 20–14 | 20 – Fears | 12 – Wague | 4 – Fears | Lenovo Center (19,178); Raleigh, NC |
*Non-conference game. ^{#}Rankings from AP poll. (#) Tournament seedings in parentheses. W=West. All times are in Central Time.

== Rankings ==
Ranking movements Legend: ██ Increase in ranking ██ Decrease in ranking — = Not ranked RV = Received votes
| | Week | | | | | | | | | | | | | | | | | | | | |
| Poll | Pre | 1 | 2 | 3 | 4 | 5 | 6 | 7 | 8 | 9 | 10 | 11 | 12 | 13 | 14 | 15 | 16 | 17 | 18 | 19 | Final |
|---|---|---|---|---|---|---|---|---|---|---|---|---|---|---|---|---|---|---|---|---|---|
| AP | — | — | — | — | 21 | 13 | 14 | 12 | 12 | 17 | RV | — | RV | RV | — | — | — | — | — | — | — |
| Coaches | — | — | — | — | 21 | 17 | 15 | 11 | 10 | 16 | RV | RV | — | — | — | — | — | — | — | — | — |
