= 2024–25 Georgia Bulldogs basketball team =

American college basketball season

2024–25 Georgia Bulldogs basketball

NCAA tournament, First Round
- Conference: Southeastern Conference
- Record: 20–13 (8–10 SEC)
- Head coach: Mike White (3rd season)
- Associate head coach: Antonio Reynolds-Dean (3rd season)
- Assistant coaches: Erik Pastrana (3rd season); Anthony Goins (1st season); Patrick Blake (2nd season)
- Home arena: Stegeman Coliseum

2024–25 Southeastern Conference men's basketball standings
	Conf.				Overall
Team	W		L	PCT	W		L	PCT
No. 4 Auburn	15	–	3	.833	32	–	6	.842
No. 1 Florida †	14	–	4	.778	36	–	4	.900
No. 6 Alabama	13	–	5	.722	28	–	9	.757
No. 5 Tennessee	12	–	6	.667	30	–	8	.789
No. 19 Texas A&M	11	–	7	.611	23	–	11	.676
No. 12 Kentucky	10	–	8	.556	24	–	12	.667
Missouri	10	–	8	.556	22	–	12	.647
No. 18 Ole Miss	10	–	8	.556	24	–	12	.667
No. 20 Arkansas	8	–	10	.444	22	–	14	.611
Mississippi State	8	–	10	.444	21	–	13	.618
Georgia	8	–	10	.444	20	–	13	.606
Vanderbilt	8	–	10	.444	20	–	13	.606
Texas	6	–	12	.333	19	–	16	.543
Oklahoma	6	–	12	.333	20	–	14	.588
LSU	3	–	15	.167	14	–	18	.438
South Carolina	2	–	16	.111	12	–	20	.375
† 2025 SEC tournament winner Rankings from AP poll

The 2024–25 Georgia Bulldogs basketball team represented the University of Georgia during the 2024–25 NCAA Division I men's basketball season. The Bulldogs, led by third-year head coach Mike White, played their home games at the Stegeman Coliseum in Athens, Georgia, as members of the Southeastern Conference. They finished the season 20–13, 8–10 in SEC play to finish in a tie for eighth place. They lost in the first round of the SEC tournament to Oklahoma. They received an at-large bid to the NCAA tournament, their first appearance in 10 years. Seeded No. 9 in the Midwest region, they lost to Gonzaga in the first round.

The Bulldogs were ranked No. 23 in the AP and Coaches poll released on January 13, the first time a Georgia team had been ranked since January 2011.

== Previous season ==
The Bulldogs finished the 2023–24 season 20–17, 6–12 in SEC play to finish in a tie for eleventh place. As the No. 11 seed in the SEC tournament, they beat Missouri in the first round, before losing to Florida in the second round. The Bulldogs received a bid to the National Invitation Tournament, where they defeated Xavier, Wake Forest, and Ohio State to advance to the tournament semifinal, before losing to Seton Hall. This was their first postseason appearance since the 2016–17 season.

== Offseason ==
=== Departures ===
Georgia departures
Name	Number	Pos.	Height	Weight	Year	Hometown	Reason for departure
Jabri Abdur-Rahim	1	G/F	6'8"	215	Senior	South Orange, New Jersey	Transferred to Providence
Mari Jordan	2	F	6'6"	190	Freshman	Atlanta, Georgia	Transferred to Tulane
Noah Thomasson	3	G	6'4"	210	GS senior	Houston, Texas	Graduated
Frank Anselem-Ibe	5	C	6'10"	215	Senior	Lagos, Nigeria	Transferred to Louisville
RJ Sunahara	10	G	6'8"	205	GS senior	Bay Village, Ohio	Graduated
Justin Hill	11	G	6'0"	185	Senior	Houston, Texas	Transferred to Wichita State
Matthew-Alexander Moncrieffe	12	F	6'8"	217	Senior	Toronto, Ontario	Transferred to Seattle
RJ Meléndez	15	F	6'7"	210	Junior	Arecibo, Puerto Rico	Transferred to Mississippi State
Jalen DeLoach	23	F	6'9"	220	Junior	Savannah, Georgia	Transferred to Loyola
Russel Tchewa	54	C	7'0"	275	GS senior	Douala, Cameroon	Graduated

=== Incoming transfers ===
Georgia incoming transfers
Name	Number	Pos.	Height	Weight	Year	Hometown	Previous school
Dakota Leffew	1	G	6'5"	185	Senior	Hampton, Georgia	Mount Saint Mary's
De'Shayne Montgomery	2	G	6'5"	185	Sophomore	Broward County, Florida	Mount Saint Mary's
Tyrin Lawrence	7	G	6'4"	200	Senior	Monticello, Georgia	Vanderbilt
RJ Godfrey	10	F	6'8"	230	Junior	Suwanee, Georgia	Clemson
Justin Abson	25	F	6'9"	255	Junior	Coconut Creek, Florida	Appalachian State

=== Recruiting class ===
==== 2024 recruiting class ====
College recruiting
Name	Hometown	School	Height	Weight	Commit date
Asa Newell; PF	Destin, Florida	Montverde Academy	6 ft 9 in (2.06 m)	205 lb (93 kg)	Oct 25, 2023
Asa Newell; PF	Recruit ratings: Rivals: 247Sports: ESPN: (92)				
Somto Cyril; C	Enugu, Nigeria	Overtime Elite	6 ft 10 in (2.08 m)	235 lb (107 kg)	Apr 29, 2024
Somto Cyril; C	Recruit ratings: Rivals: 247Sports: ESPN: (87)				
Savo Drezgić; PG	Belgrade, Serbia	DME Academy	6 ft 3 in (1.91 m)	198 lb (90 kg)	Jun 14, 2024
Savo Drezgić; PG	Recruit ratings: Rivals: 247Sports: ESPN: (81)				
Jordyn Kee; CG	Broward County, Florida	Sagemont Prep	6 ft 4 in (1.93 m)	170 lb (77 kg)	May 29, 2024
Jordyn Kee; CG	Recruit ratings: Rivals: 247Sports: ESPN: (80)				
Overall recruit ranking: Rivals: 10 247Sports: 15 ESPN: —
Note: In many cases, Scout, Rivals, 247Sports, On3, and ESPN may conflict in their listings of height and weight.; In these cases, the average was taken. ESPN grades are on a 100-point scale.; Sources: "Georgia 2024 Basketball Commitments". Rivals.; "2024 Georgia Bulldogs Recruiting Class". ESPN.; "2024 Team Ranking". Rivals.

== Roster ==
2024–25 Georgia Bulldogs men's basketball team
Players
Coaches

Pos.	#	Name	Height	Weight	Year	Previous school	Hometown
G	0	Blue Cain	6 ft 5 in (1.96 m)	195 lb (88 kg)	So	IMG Academy	Knoxville, TN
G	1	Dakota Leffew	6 ft 5 in (1.96 m)	195 lb (88 kg)	GS	Jonesboro HS; Mount St. Mary's	Hampton, GA
G	2	De'Shayne Montgomery	6 ft 5 in (1.96 m)	190 lb (86 kg)	So	Hargrave Military Academy; Mount St. Mary's	Fort Lauderdale, FL
G	3	Savo Drezgić	6 ft 4 in (1.93 m)	190 lb (86 kg)	Fr	DME Academy	Belgrade, Serbia
G	4	Jordyn Kee	6 ft 3 in (1.91 m)	185 lb (84 kg)	Fr	Sagemont Prep	Broward County, FL
G	5	Silas Demary Jr.	6 ft 5 in (1.96 m)	195 lb (88 kg)	So	Combine Academy	Raleigh, NC
C	6	Somto Cyril	6 ft 11 in (2.11 m)	260 lb (118 kg)	Fr	Overtime Elite	Enugu, Nigeria
G	7	Tyrin Lawrence	6 ft 4 in (1.93 m)	200 lb (91 kg)	GS	Morgan County HS; Vanderbilt	Monticello, GA
F	10	RJ Godfrey	6 ft 8 in (2.03 m)	230 lb (104 kg)	Jr	North Gwinnett; Clemson	Suwanee, GA
G	12	Markel Jennings	5 ft 11 in (1.8 m)	165 lb (75 kg)	RS Fr	Athens Academy	Athens, GA
F	13	Dylan James	6 ft 9 in (2.06 m)	210 lb (95 kg)	So	Winter Haven HS	Winter Haven, FL
F	14	Asa Newell	6 ft 11 in (2.11 m)	220 lb (100 kg)	Fr	Montverde Academy	Destin, FL
G	22	Brandon Klatsky	6 ft 4 in (1.93 m)	175 lb (79 kg)	RS So	Ranney School	Colts Neck, NJ
F	24	Jaden Newell	6 ft 8 in (2.03 m)	225 lb (102 kg)	RS So	Choctawhatchee HS; Iona	Destin, FL
F	25	Justin Abson	6 ft 9 in (2.06 m)	255 lb (116 kg)	Jr	North Broward Prep; Appalachian State	Pompano Beach, FL

Head coach

- Mike White (Ole Miss)

Assistant coach(es)

- Antonio Reynolds Dean (Rhode Island)
- Anthony Goins (St. John's)
- Erik Pastrana (Florida State)
- Patrick Blake (Mississippi)

Legend

- (C) Team captain
- (S) Suspended
- (I) Ineligible
- (W) Walk-on
- Injured
- Current redshirt

Roster

== Schedule and results ==
Date time, TV	Rank^{#}	Opponent^{#}	Result	Record	High points	High rebounds	High assists	Site (attendance) city, state
Exhibition
October 19, 2024*; 12:00 p.m.		at Charlotte	W 86–59	–	20 – A. Newell	7 – Cyril	5 – Lawrence	Dale F. Halton Arena; Charlotte, NC
October 29, 2024*; 7:00 p.m.		UCF	W 114–76	–	20 – Cain	7 – A. Newell	6 – Demary Jr.	Stegeman Coliseum; Athens, GA
Non-conference regular season
November 4, 2024*; 7:30 p.m., SECN+/ESPN+		Tennessee Tech	W 83–78	1–0	26 – A. Newell	11 – A. Newell	3 – Tied	Stegeman Coliseum (6,193); Athens, GA
November 10, 2024*; 3:30 p.m., SECN+/ESPN+		Texas Southern; Peach State Classic	W 92–64	2–0	23 – Leffew	11 – Cain	6 – Demary Jr.	Stegeman Coliseum (5,405); Athens, GA
November 12, 2024*; 7:00 p.m., SECN+/ESPN+		North Florida; Peach State Classic	W 90–77	3–0	21 – Godfrey	12 – Godfrey	5 – Demary Jr.	Stegeman Coliseum (5,757); Athens, GA
November 15, 2024*; 8:00 p.m., ACCNX/ESPN+		at Georgia Tech	W 77–69	4–0	18 – Demary Jr.	7 – Tied	4 – Lawrence	McCamish Pavilion (6,622); Atlanta, GA
November 19, 2024*; 7:00 p.m., SECN+/ESPN+		Alabama A&M	W 93–45	5–0	17 – A. Newell	9 – Cyril	5 – Lawrence	Stegeman Coliseum (5,775); Athens, GA
November 23, 2024*; 11:00 a.m., FloHoops		vs. No. 15 Marquette; Atlantis Resort Series	L 69–80	5–1	17 – Cain	7 – Demary Jr.	5 – Leffew	Imperial Arena (822); Paradise Island, The Bahamas
November 24, 2024*; 11:00 a.m., CBSSN		vs. No. 22 St. John's; Atlantis Resort Series	W 66–63	6–1	18 – A. Newell	9 – Lawrence	5 – Lawrence	Imperial Arena (419); Paradise Island, The Bahamas
November 30, 2024*; 7:00 p.m., SECN+/ESPN+		Jacksonville	W 102–56	7–1	16 – Leffew	5 – Cyril	3 – Cain	Stegeman Coliseum (6,285); Athens, GA
December 3, 2024*; 7:00 p.m., ESPNU		Notre Dame; ACC–SEC Challenge	W 69–48	8–1	20 – A. Newell	11 – A. Newell	7 – Lawrence	Stegeman Coliseum (8,045); Athens, GA
December 14, 2024*; 6:00 p.m., SECN		vs. Grand Canyon; Holiday Hoopsgiving	W 73–68	9–1	17 – A. Newell	8 – Tied	4 – Tied	State Farm Arena; Atlanta, GA
December 19, 2024*; 7:00 p.m., SECN+/ESPN+		Buffalo	W 100–49	10–1	16 – Tied	11 – Cyril	4 – Tied	Stegeman Coliseum (6,349); Athens, GA
December 22, 2024*; 3:30 p.m., SECN		Charleston Southern	W 81–65	11–1	22 – Montgomery	8 – Abson	3 – Demary Jr.	Stegeman Coliseum (8,368); Athens, GA
December 29, 2024*; 2:00 p.m., SECN+/ESPN+		South Carolina State	W 79–72	12–1	14 – Tied	6 – Tied	4 – Montgomery	Stegeman Coliseum (10,140); Athens, GA
SEC regular season
January 4, 2025; 12:00 p.m., SECN		at No. 24 Ole Miss	L 51–63	12–2 (0–1)	13 – A. Newell	13 – A. Newell	2 – Tied	SJB Pavilion (8,746); Oxford, MS
January 7, 2025; 7:00 p.m., SECN		No. 6 Kentucky	W 82–69	13–2 (1–1)	17 – A. Newell	8 – Tied	2 – Tied	Stegeman Coliseum (10,523); Athens, GA
January 11, 2025; 6:00 p.m., ESPN2		No. 17 Oklahoma	W 72–62	14–2 (2–1)	15 – Tied	8 – Demary Jr.	4 – Tied	Stegeman Coliseum (10,523); Athens, GA
January 15, 2025; 8:00 p.m., SECN	No. 23	at No. 6 Tennessee	L 56–74	14–3 (2–2)	13 – A. Newell	5 – A. Newell	2 – Tied	Thompson–Boling Arena (19,239); Knoxville, TN
January 18, 2025; 1:00 p.m., SECN	No. 23	No. 1 Auburn	L 68–70	14–4 (2–3)	16 – A. Newell	10 – A. Newell	2 – Tied	Stegeman Coliseum (10,523); Athens, GA
January 22, 2025; 9:00 p.m., SECN		at Arkansas	L 65–68	14–5 (2–4)	18 – A. Newell	8 – A. Newell	4 – Lawrence	Bud Walton Arena (19,200); Fayetteville, AR
January 25, 2025; 3:30 p.m., SECN		at No. 5 Florida	L 59–89	14–6 (2–5)	10 – Cain	6 – A. Newell	3 – Tied	O'Connell Center (11,187); Gainesville, FL
January 28, 2025; 7:00 p.m., SECN		South Carolina	W 71–60	15–6 (3–5)	17 – A. Newell	10 – A. Newell	4 – Tied	Stegeman Coliseum (7,062); Athens, GA
February 1, 2025; 4:00 p.m., ESPN2		at No. 4 Alabama	L 69–90	15–7 (3–6)	16 – A. Newell	7 – A. Newell	4 – Demary Jr.	Coleman Coliseum (13,474); Tuscaloosa, AL
February 5, 2025; 9:00 p.m., SECN		LSU	W 81–62	16–7 (4–6)	17 – A. Newell	10 – Tied	8 – Cain	Stegeman Coliseum (7,193); Athens, GA
February 8, 2025; 6:00 p.m., SECN		No. 22 Mississippi State	L 75–76	16–8 (4–7)	23 – Demary Jr.	7 – Godfrey	7 – Demary Jr.	Stegeman Coliseum (10,169); Athens, GA
February 11, 2025; 9:00 p.m., SECN		at No. 8 Texas A&M	L 53–69	16–9 (4–8)	19 – Demary Jr.	5 – Tied	4 – Demary Jr.	Reed Arena (9,283); College Station, TX
February 15, 2025; 3:30 p.m., SECN		No. 21 Missouri	L 74–87	16–10 (4–9)	23 – A. Newell	10 – A. Newell	4 – Demary Jr.	Stegeman Coliseum (9,653); Athens, GA
February 22, 2025; 4:00 p.m., ESPN		at No. 1 Auburn	L 70–82	16–11 (4–10)	20 – A. Newell	5 – Tied	4 – Demary Jr.	Neville Arena (9,121); Auburn, AL
February 25, 2025; 7:00 p.m., SECN		No. 3 Florida	W 88–83	17–11 (5–10)	21 – Demary Jr.	9 – A. Newell	5 – Abson	Stegeman Coliseum (10,066); Athens, GA
March 1, 2025; 8:00 p.m., ESPN2		at Texas	W 83–67	18–11 (6–10)	26 – Demary Jr.	9 – Cain	6 – Lawrence	Moody Center (10,765); Austin, TX
March 4, 2025; 6:00 p.m., SECN		at South Carolina	W 73–64	19–11 (7–10)	16 – Demary Jr.	8 – Demary Jr.	4 – Demary Jr.	Colonial Life Arena (11,633); Columbia, SC
March 8, 2025; 12:00 p.m., ESPNU		Vanderbilt	W 79–68	20–11 (8–10)	15 – Tied	7 – Cyril	2 – Cyril	Stegeman Coliseum (10,523); Athens, GA
SEC tournament
March 12, 2025; 9:30 p.m., SECN	(11)	vs. (14) Oklahoma; First round	L 75–81	20–12	24 – Demary Jr.	17 – A. Newell	4 – James	Bridgestone Arena (13,912); Nashville, TN
NCAA tournament
March 20, 2025*; 4:35 p.m., TBS	(9 MW)	vs. (8 MW) No. 24 Gonzaga; First round	L 68–89	20–13	20 – A. Newell	8 – A. Newell	4 – Demary Jr.	Intrust Bank Arena (14,355); Wichita, KS
*Non-conference game. ^{#}Rankings from AP Poll. (#) Tournament seedings in parentheses. MW=Midwest. All times are in Eastern Time.

== Rankings ==
Ranking movements Legend: ██ Increase in ranking ██ Decrease in ranking — = Not ranked RV = Received votes
	Week																				
Poll	Pre	1	2	3	4	5	6	7	8	9	10	11	12	13	14	15	16	17	18	19	Final
AP	—	—	—	RV	RV	RV	RV	RV	RV	RV	23	RV	—	—	—	—	—	—	—	—	—
Coaches	—	—	—	RV	RV	RV	RV	RV	RV	RV	23	RV	RV	—	—	—	—	—	—	—	—
