= 2024–25 Florida Gators men's basketball team =

American college basketball season

2024–25 Florida Gators men's basketball

NCAA tournament National Champions SEC tournament champions ESPN Events Invitational champions

National Championship Game, W 65–63 vs. Houston
- Conference: Southeastern Conference

Ranking
- Coaches: No. 1
- AP: No. 1
- Record: 36–4 (14–4 SEC)
- Head coach: Todd Golden (3rd season)
- Assistant coaches: Carlin Hartman (3rd season); Kevin Hovde (3rd season); Korey McCray (3rd season); John Andrzejek (2nd season); Taurean Green (2nd season)
- Home arena: O'Connell Center

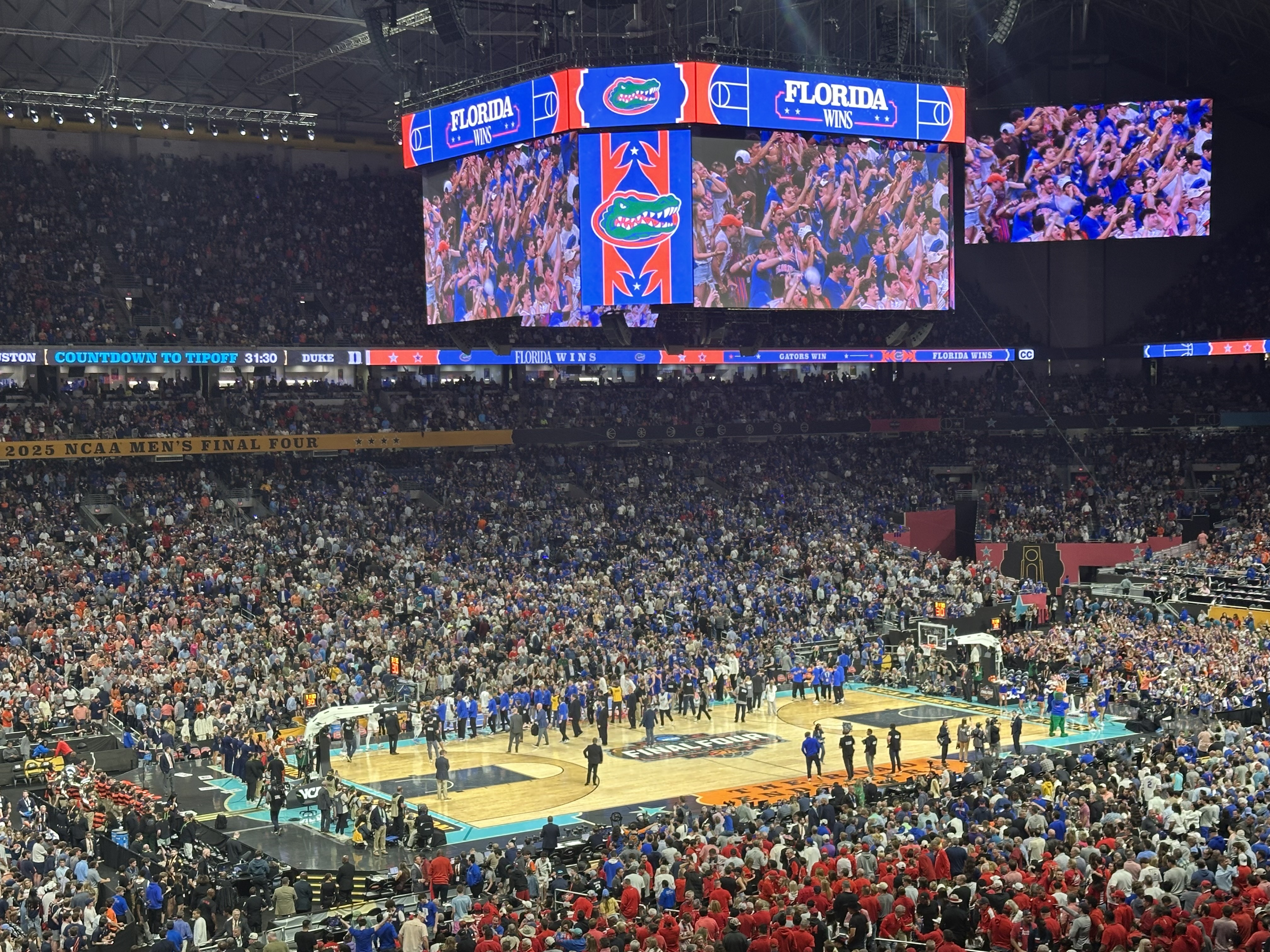
The Alamodome after Florida's 79–73 win over SEC rival Auburn in the 2025 Final Four.

2024–25 Southeastern Conference men's basketball standings
	Conf.				Overall
Team	W		L	PCT	W		L	PCT
No. 4 Auburn	15	–	3	.833	32	–	6	.842
No. 1 Florida †	14	–	4	.778	36	–	4	.900
No. 6 Alabama	13	–	5	.722	28	–	9	.757
No. 5 Tennessee	12	–	6	.667	30	–	8	.789
No. 19 Texas A&M	11	–	7	.611	23	–	11	.676
No. 12 Kentucky	10	–	8	.556	24	–	12	.667
Missouri	10	–	8	.556	22	–	12	.647
No. 18 Ole Miss	10	–	8	.556	24	–	12	.667
No. 20 Arkansas	8	–	10	.444	22	–	14	.611
Mississippi State	8	–	10	.444	21	–	13	.618
Georgia	8	–	10	.444	20	–	13	.606
Vanderbilt	8	–	10	.444	20	–	13	.606
Texas	6	–	12	.333	19	–	16	.543
Oklahoma	6	–	12	.333	20	–	14	.588
LSU	3	–	15	.167	14	–	18	.438
South Carolina	2	–	16	.111	12	–	20	.375
† 2025 SEC tournament winner Rankings from AP poll

The 2024–25 Florida Gators men's basketball team represented the University of Florida during the 2024–25 NCAA Division I men's basketball season. The Gators, led by third-year head coach Todd Golden, played their home games at the O'Connell Center in Gainesville, Florida, as members of the Southeastern Conference (SEC).

During this season, Florida experienced its most success in 11 years and restored itself as an elite program. Paying homage to the Florida team that won back-to-back championships 18 years prior, this team adopted the motto, "Gator Boys Stay Hot".

Led by senior guards Walter Clayton Jr., Will Richard, and Alijah Martin, Florida posted a 27–4 regular season record, finishing second in the most difficult SEC season in conference history. The Gators got off to a hot start when they finished non-conference play with a 13–0 record and No. 6 ranking in the AP Poll, which was their highest ranking in 7 years. Despite early losses to Kentucky and Missouri, Florida got hot and finished the regular season winning 9 of their last 10 games. During this stretch, they pulled off massive wins on the road against No. 1 Auburn and No. 7 Alabama. Led by Clayton Jr. and Alex Condon, Florida was able to beat a No. 1 team on the road for the first time in program history.

As the No. 2 seed in the SEC tournament at Bridgestone Arena in Nashville, Tennessee, they defeated Missouri, 95–81, in the quarterfinals and Alabama, 104–82, in the semifinals to advance to the SEC Championship, where they defeated Tennessee, 86–77, to clinch their first SEC championship since 2014. They received an automatic bid to the 2025 NCAA Division I men's basketball tournament as the No. 1 seed in the West region. They defeated Norfolk State, 95–69, in the first round, two-time defending national champions UConn, 77–75, in the second round, and Maryland, 87–71, in the Sweet Sixteen to advance to the Elite Eight. There, they defeated Texas Tech, 84–79, to advance to their first Final Four since 2014. They would then defeat SEC rival Auburn, 79–73, to advance to their first championship since 2007. In the championship game, they overcame a 12-point deficit late in the second half to beat Houston, 65–63, to clinch their third national title overall and their first since 2007.

== Previous season ==
The Gators finished the 2023–24 season 24–12, 11–7 in SEC play, to finish in sixth place. In the SEC tournament, the Gators beat Georgia, 85–80, in the first round, Alabama, 102–88, in the second round, and Texas A&M, 95–90, in the semifinals to advance to the championship game where they would fall to Auburn, 86–67. The Gators earned an at-large bid to the 2024 NCAA Division I men's basketball tournament as the No. 7 seed in the South region, where they lost to Colorado, 102–100, in the first round.

== Roster ==
2024–25 Florida Gators men's basketball team
Players
Coaches

Pos.	#	Name	Height	Weight	Year	Previous school	Hometown
G	1	Walter Clayton Jr.	6 ft 3 in (1.91 m)	195 lb (88 kg)	Sr	Bartow HS; Iona	Lake Wales, FL
G	2	Kevin Pazmino	6 ft 4 in (1.93 m)	195 lb (88 kg)	So	Cypress Bay HS; Santa Fe College	Weston, FL
C	3	Micah Handlogten	7 ft 1 in (2.16 m)	235 lb (107 kg)	Jr	SouthLake Christian Academy; Marshall	Lake Norman, NC
F	4	Sam Alexis	6 ft 8 in (2.03 m)	240 lb (109 kg)	Jr	Apokpa HS; Chattanooga	Apopka, FL
G	5	Will Richard	6 ft 4 in (1.93 m)	206 lb (93 kg)	Sr	Woodward Academy; Belmont	Fairburn, GA
G	7	Urban Klavžar	6 ft 1 in (1.85 m)	195 lb (88 kg)	So	Real Madrid	Domžale, Slovenia
C	9	Rueben Chinyelu	6 ft 10 in (2.08 m)	255 lb (116 kg)	So	Stade Malien; Washington State	Enugwu-Agidi, Nigeria
F	10	Thomas Haugh	6 ft 9 in (2.06 m)	215 lb (98 kg)	So	Perkiomen School	New Oxford, PA
G	11	Denzel Aberdeen	6 ft 5 in (1.96 m)	190 lb (86 kg)	Jr	Dr. Phillips HS	Orlando, FL
C	12	Viktor Mikić	6 ft 11 in (2.11 m)	240 lb (109 kg)	Fr	Hamilton Heights (TN)	Belgrade, Serbia
G	15	Alijah Martin	6 ft 2 in (1.88 m)	210 lb (95 kg)	GS	North Pike HS; Florida Atlantic	Summit, MS
G	20	Isaiah Brown	6 ft 4 in (1.93 m)	195 lb (88 kg)	Fr	Orlando Christian Prep	Orlando, FL
F/C	21	Alex Condon	6 ft 11 in (2.11 m)	230 lb (104 kg)	So	NBA Global Academy	Perth, Australia
G	22	Bennett Andersen (W)	6 ft 2 in (1.88 m)	190 lb (86 kg)	GS	Jesuit HS	Tampa, FL
G	30	Kajus Kublickas	6 ft 2 in (1.88 m)	180 lb (82 kg)	So	Zalgiris II	Kaunas, Lithuania
C	32	Olivier Rioux (redshirt)	7 ft 9 in (2.36 m)	305 lb (138 kg)	Fr	IMG Academy	Terrebonne, QC
G	33	Cooper Josefsberg (W)	6 ft 4 in (1.93 m)	195 lb (88 kg)	So	Riviera Prep	Miami, FL

Head coach

- Todd Golden (Saint Mary's)

Assistant coach(es)

- Taurean Green (Florida)
- Carlin Hartman (Tulane)
- Kevin Hovde (Richmond)
- Korey McCray (Mercer)
- John Andrzejek (Columbia)

Legend

- (C) Team captain
- (S) Suspended
- (I) Ineligible
- (W) Walk-on
- Injured
- Current redshirt

Roster
Last update: November 15, 2024

== Schedule and results ==
Date time, TV	Rank^{#}	Opponent^{#}	Result	Record	High points	High rebounds	High assists	Site (attendance) city, state
Non-conference regular season
November 4, 2024*; 8:30 p.m., SECN	No. 21	vs. South Florida; Jacksonville Sports Foundation Invitational	W 98–83	1–0	29 – Clayton Jr.	6 – Tied	3 – Martin	VyStar Veterans Memorial Arena (5,764); Jacksonville, FL
November 7, 2024*; 8:00 p.m., SECN+/ESPN+	No. 21	Jacksonville	W 81–60	2–0	23 – Condon	7 – Alexis	7 – Clayton Jr.	O'Connell Center (8,381); Gainesville, FL
November 11, 2024*; 7:00 p.m., SECN+/ESPN+	No. 20	Grambling State	W 86–62	3–0	14 – Chinyelu	8 – Tied	3 – Tied	O'Connell Center (7,857); Gainesville, FL
November 15, 2024*; 6:00 p.m., ACCN	No. 20	at Florida State; Rivalry	W 87–74	4–0	25 – Clayton Jr.	12 – Condon	3 – Tied	Donald L. Tucker Civic Center (9,797); Tallahassee, FL
November 19, 2024*; 7:00 p.m., SECN+/ESPN+	No. 21	Florida A&M	W 84–60	5–0	20 – Richard	9 – Tied	5 – Clayton Jr.	O'Connell Center (8,005); Gainesville, FL
November 22, 2024*; 7:00 p.m., SECN	No. 21	Southern Illinois	W 93–68	6–0	32 – Martin	9 – Martin	5 – Martin	O'Connell Center (9,533); Gainesville, FL
November 28, 2024*; 2:30 p.m., ESPN	No. 18	vs. Wake Forest; ESPN Events Invitational Semifinal	W 75–58	7–0	21 – Clayton Jr.	9 – Chinyelu	3 – Clayton Jr.	State Farm Field House (3,191); Bay Lake, FL
November 29, 2024*; 3:30 p.m., ESPN	No. 18	vs. Wichita State; ESPN Events Invitational Final	W 88–51	8–0	19 – Clayton Jr.	11 – Chinyelu	5 – Richard	State Farm Field House (3,875); Bay Lake, FL
December 4, 2024*; 7:15 p.m., ESPN2	No. 13	Virginia; ACC–SEC Challenge	W 87–69	9–0	27 – Clayton Jr.	8 – Condon	4 – Clayton Jr.	O'Connell Center (9,184); Gainesville, FL
December 14, 2024*; 3:30 p.m., SECN	No. 9	vs. Arizona State; Holiday Hoopsgiving	W 83–66	10–0	25 – Clayton Jr.	11 – Martin	6 – Martin	State Farm Arena (12,900); Atlanta, GA
December 17, 2024*; 7:00 p.m., ESPN	No. 7	vs. North Carolina; Jumpman Invitational	W 90–84	11–0	22 – Richard	10 – Condon	5 – Condon	Spectrum Center (16,058); Charlotte, NC
December 21, 2024*; 12:00 p.m., SECN	No. 7	North Florida	W 99–45	12–0	26 – Richard	12 – Alexis	4 – Aberdeen	O'Connell Center (10,109); Gainesville, FL
December 29, 2024*; 1:00 p.m., SECN+/ESPN+	No. 6	Stetson	W 85–45	13–0	18 – Martin	12 – Alexis	7 – Clayton Jr.	O'Connell Center (10,676); Gainesville, FL
SEC regular season
January 4, 2025; 11:00 a.m., ESPN	No. 6	at No. 10 Kentucky; Rivalry	L 100–106	13–1 (0–1)	33 – Clayton Jr.	10 – Condon	5 – Clayton Jr.	Rupp Arena (21,093); Lexington, KY
January 7, 2025; 7:00 p.m., ESPN2	No. 8	No. 1 Tennessee	W 73–43	14–1 (1–1)	18 – Martin	15 – Chinyelu	5 – Clayton Jr.	O'Connell Center (11,011); Gainesville, FL
January 11, 2025; 4:00 p.m., ESPN	No. 8	at Arkansas	W 71–63	15–1 (2–1)	14 – Martin	10 – Condon	5 – Clayton Jr.	Bud Walton Arena (19,200); Fayetteville, AR
January 14, 2025; 9:00 p.m., ESPNU	No. 5	Missouri	L 82–83	15–2 (2–2)	28 – Clayton Jr.	10 – Chinyelu	3 – Condon	O'Connell Center (10,491); Gainesville, FL
January 18, 2025; 4:00 p.m., ESPN2	No. 5	Texas	W 84–60	16–2 (3–2)	22 – Martin	12 – Condon	4 – Martin	O'Connell Center (11,107); Gainesville, FL
January 22, 2025; 7:00 p.m., SECN	No. 5	at South Carolina	W 70–69	17–2 (4–2)	22 – Richard	7 – Condon	7 – Clayton Jr.	Colonial Life Arena (14,930); Columbia, SC
January 25, 2025; 3:30 p.m., SECN	No. 5	Georgia	W 89–59	18–2 (5–2)	17 – Tied	11 – Haugh	5 – Clayton Jr.	O'Connell Center (11,187); Gainesville, FL
February 1, 2025; 12:00 p.m., ESPN	No. 5	at No. 8 Tennessee	L 44–64	18–3 (5–3)	10 – Clayton Jr.	10 – Haugh	2 – Richard	Thompson–Boling Arena (21,678); Knoxville, TN
February 4, 2025; 7:00 p.m., SECN	No. 6	Vanderbilt	W 86–75	19–3 (6–3)	21 – Richard	9 – Tied	4 – Tied	O'Connell Center (9,745); Gainesville, FL
February 8, 2025; 4:00 p.m., ESPN2	No. 6	at No. 1 Auburn	W 90–81	20–3 (7–3)	19 – Clayton Jr.	10 – Condon	9 – Clayton Jr.	Neville Arena (9,121); Auburn, AL
February 11, 2025; 7:00 p.m., ESPN2	No. 3т	at No. 22 Mississippi State	W 81–68	21–3 (8–3)	20 – Aberdeen	9 – Haugh	8 – Haugh	Humphrey Coliseum (9,401); Starkville, MS
February 15, 2025; 8:30 p.m., SECN	No. 3т	South Carolina	W 88–67	22–3 (9–3)	22 – Aberdeen	6 – Tied	8 – Clayton Jr.	O'Connell Center (10,853); Gainesville, FL
February 18, 2025; 7:00 p.m., ESPN2	No. 2	Oklahoma	W 85–63	23–3 (10–3)	18 – Clayton Jr.	8 – Richard	3 – Aberdeen	O'Connell Center (10,513); Gainesville, FL
February 22, 2025; 6:00 p.m., SECN	No. 2	at LSU	W 79–65	24–3 (11–3)	19 – Chinyelu	13 – Chinyelu	5 – Richard	Pete Maravich Assembly Center (8,569); Baton Rouge, LA
February 25, 2025; 7:00 p.m., SECN	No. 3	at Georgia	L 83–88	24–4 (11–4)	30 – Richard	9 – Handlogten	5 – Clayton Jr.	Stegeman Coliseum (10,066); Athens, GA
March 1, 2025; 8:30 p.m., SECN	No. 3	No. 12 Texas A&M; College GameDay	W 89–70	25–4 (12–4)	25 – Richard	9 – Condon	4 – Tied	O'Connell Center (10,784); Gainesville, FL
March 5, 2025; 7:00 p.m., ESPN2	No. 5	at No. 7 Alabama	W 99–94	26–4 (13–4)	27 – Condon	11 – Chinyelu	8 – Clayton Jr.	Coleman Coliseum (13,474); Tuscaloosa, AL
March 8, 2025; 6:00 p.m., SECN	No. 5	Ole Miss	W 90–71	27–4 (14–4)	23 – Clayton Jr.	15 – Condon	8 – Clayton Jr.	O'Connell Center (11,191); Gainesville, FL
SEC tournament
March 14, 2025; 7:00 p.m., SECN	(2) No. 4	vs. (7) No. 21 Missouri; Quarterfinal	W 95–81	28–4	18 – Clayton Jr.	8 – Condon	6 – Clayton Jr.	Bridgestone Arena (18,608); Nashville, TN
March 15, 2025; 3:30 p.m., ESPN	(2) No. 4	vs. (3) No. 5 Alabama; Semifinal / College GameDay	W 104–82	29–4	22 – Clayton Jr.	10 – Tied	6 – Clayton Jr.	Bridgestone Arena (19,049); Nashville, TN
March 16, 2025; 1:00 p.m., ESPN	(2) No. 4	vs. (4) No. 8 Tennessee; Championship	W 86–77	30–4	22 – Clayton Jr.	9 – Condon	3 – Richard	Bridgestone Arena (19,151); Nashville, TN
NCAA tournament
March 21, 2025; 6:50 p.m., TNT	(1 W) No. 3	vs. (16 W) Norfolk State; First round	W 95–69	31–4	23 – Clayton Jr.	8 – Tied	5 – Richard	Lenovo Center (19,178); Raleigh, NC
March 23, 2025; 12:10 p.m., CBS	(1 W) No. 3	vs. (8 W) UConn; Second round	W 77–75	32–4	23 – Clayton Jr.	7 – Haugh	4 – Condon	Lenovo Center (19,244); Raleigh, NC
March 27, 2025; 7:39 p.m., TBS/TruTV	(1 W) No. 3	vs. (4 W) No. 11 Maryland; Sweet Sixteen	W 87–71	33–4	15 – Richard	9 – Haugh	4 – Haugh	Chase Center (16,417); San Francisco, CA
March 29, 2025; 6:09 p.m., TBS/TruTV	(1 W) No. 3	vs. (3 W) No. 9 Texas Tech; Elite Eight	W 84–79	34–4	30 – Clayton Jr.	11 – Haugh	4 – Clayton Jr.	Chase Center (16,778); San Francisco, CA
April 5, 2025; 6:09 p.m., CBS	(1 W) No. 3	vs. (1 S) No. 4 Auburn; Final Four	W 79–73	35–4	34 – Clayton Jr.	9 – Chinyelu	3 – Condon	Alamodome (68,252); San Antonio, TX
April 7, 2025; 8:50 p.m., CBS	(1 W) No. 3	vs. (1 MW) No. 2 Houston; National Championship	W 65–63	36–4	18 – Richard	8 – Richard	7 – Clayton Jr.	Alamodome (66,602); San Antonio, TX
*Non-conference game. ^{#}Rankings from AP poll. (#) Tournament seedings in parentheses. W=West. S=South. MW=Midwest. All times are in Eastern Time.

== Rankings ==
Ranking movements Legend: ██ Increase in ranking ██ Decrease in ranking т = Tied with team above or below ( ) = First-place votes
	Week																				
Poll	Pre	1	2	3	4	5	6	7	8	9	10	11	12	13	14	15	16	17	18	19	Final
AP	21	20	21	18	13	9	7	6	6	8	5 (1)	5	5	6	3т (3)	2 (1)	3	5	4	3 (2)	1 (61)
Coaches	21	19	19	16	13	7	6	5	5	8	4	6	6	6	3	2	3	5	4 (1)	3 (3)	1 (31)
