= Todd Golden =

American basketball coach (born 1985)

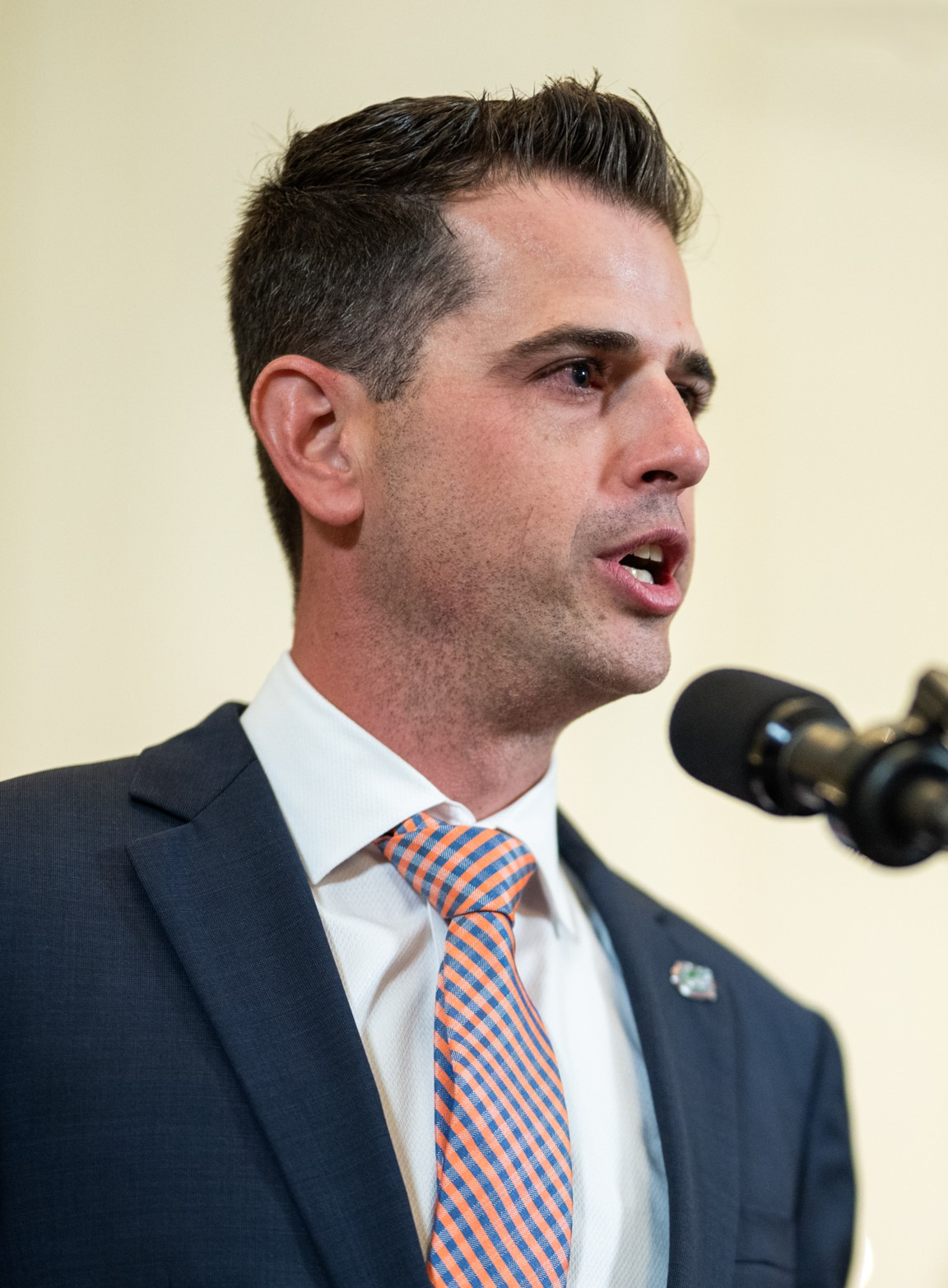
- Golden in 2025

Current position
- Title: Head coach
- Team: Florida
- Conference: SEC
- Record: 108–42 (.720)

Biographical details
- Born: July 7, 1985 (age 41); Phoenix, Arizona, U.S.

Playing career
- 2004–2008: Saint Mary's
- 2008–2010: Maccabi Haifa

Coaching career (HC unless noted)
- 2012–2014: Columbia (assistant)
- 2014–2016: Auburn (assistant)
- 2016–2019: San Francisco (associate)
- 2019–2022: San Francisco
- 2022–present: Florida

Head coaching record
- Overall: 165–78 (.679)
- Tournaments: 7–3 (NCAA Division I); 0–1 (NIT)

Accomplishments and honors

Championships
- NCAA Division I tournament (2025); NCAA Division I regional – Final Four (2025); SEC tournament (2025); SEC regular season (2026)

Awards
- SEC Coach of the Year (2026)

Todd Raymond Golden (born July 7, 1985) is an American college basketball coach. He is the current head coach of the Florida Gators men's basketball team. During the 2024–25 season, Golden led the Gators to a 36–4 record and the national championship.

== Early life and education ==
Golden is from Phoenix, Arizona, and graduated from Sunnyslope High School in 2003. Golden played basketball and baseball at Sunnyslope and helped them win the 2002 Arizona 4A state championship in basketball, scoring 6 of their 62 points in a 62–61 victory.

In 2003, Golden enrolled at Saint Mary's College of California, where he played guard for the Saint Mary's Gaels from 2004 to 2008. The Gaels would make appearances in the 2005 and 2008 NCAA Tournaments during his career, though he did not appear in their sole 2005 NCAA tournament game, a 65–56 loss to Southern Illinois. Golden played a total of 109 games with 82 starts, averaging 5.5 points, 2.4 rebounds, and 2.5 assists. During his senior season of 2007–08, he ranked second in the nation in assist-to-turnover ratio, and graduated as the Gaels' all-time leader in free-throw percentage (83.2%) before the record was broken by Matthew Dellavedova.

== Professional basketball career ==
From 2008 to 2010, Golden played for Maccabi Haifa in the Israeli Basketball Premier League. In two seasons with Maccabi Haifa, Golden played in 22 games and averaged 2.2 points. Golden also competed in the 2009 Maccabiah Games with the USA Open Team.

== Coaching career ==
After working in the private sector in advertising sales once his playing career was over, Golden entered the college coaching ranks, joining Kyle Smith's staff at Columbia University, first as director of basketball operations, then as an assistant coach. He then took a director of basketball operations position at Auburn under Bruce Pearl, his coach during the 2009 Maccabiah Games. Golden rose to assistant coach with the Tigers in his final season, before reuniting with Smith at San Francisco.

=== San Francisco ===
On April 1, 2019, Golden was officially introduced as the 20th men's basketball coach in Dons history, replacing Smith who departed for Washington State.

In his first season as head coach, Golden led San Francisco to a 22–12 record (9–7 in conference play) and a fifth-place finish in the WCC. The Dons' season was ended with an 81–77 loss to Gonzaga in the WCC tournament semifinals.

In 2020–21, the Dons took a step back from the year prior, amassing an 11–14 record (4–9 in conference play) and finishing eighth in the WCC. On November 27, 2020, the Dons defeated No. 4 ranked Virginia 61–60, Virginia's first loss to a non-major opponent since their 2018 NCAA Tournament loss to 16-seeded UMBC.

The 2021–22 season was the most successful of Golden's tenure, achieving a 24–10 (10–6 in conference play) record, and qualifying for the NCAA tournament, the program's first appearance since 1998. They lost in overtime 92–87 to Murray State in the first round. The program's 24 wins represented their highest mark since winning 25 games during the 1981–82 season.

=== Florida ===
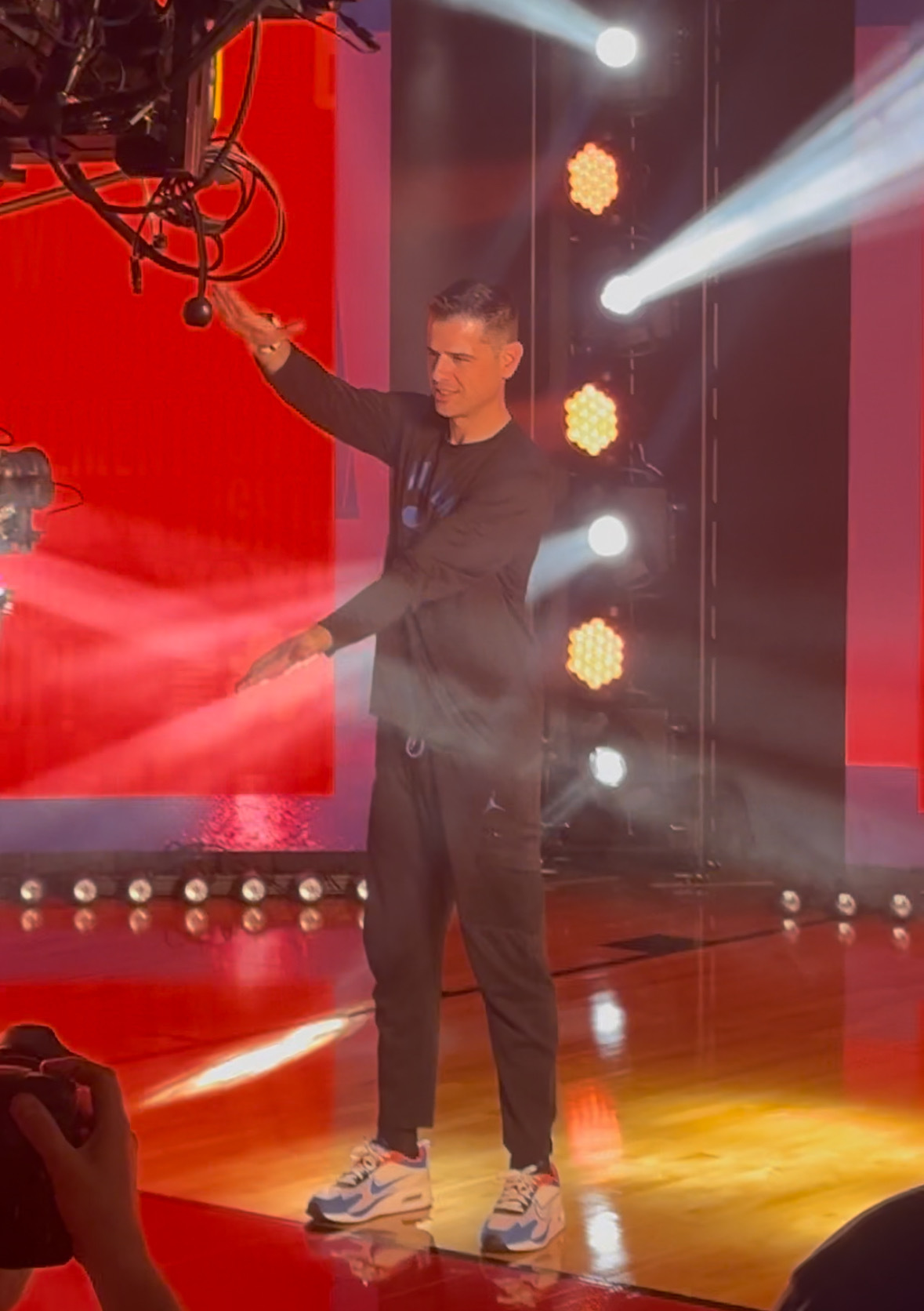
Todd Golden at a photoshoot ahead of the 2025 Final Four in San Antonio

On March 18, 2022, Golden was announced as the next men's basketball coach at Florida, following the departure of Mike White to Georgia. His contract with the school is for six years, worth $18 million over the life of the contract.

In 2022–23, Golden's first as head coach, Florida finished 8th in the SEC with a 9–9 record, including a 67–54 win over then #2 Tennessee, but ultimately finished with a losing 16–17 record after consecutive first-round exits in the SEC tournament and NIT to close the season.

Florida amassed a 24–12 record in 2023–24 (11–7 in conference play), including a run to the championship game of the SEC Tournament, where they were ultimately beaten by Auburn. For their season they were awarded a seven seed in the 2024 NCAA tournament, but lost their first-round game to Colorado, 102–100. This team's 24 wins were the most by a Gators team since 2017.

The 2024–25 team under Golden finished the season with a 36–4 record, winning the SEC and NCAA tournaments. This marked the Gators' first national title since 2007. Golden was named a finalist for Naismith Coach of the Year. On May 6, 2025, Florida gave Golden a six-year, $40.5 million contract extension, making him at the time one of the five-highest paid college coaches.

==== Misconduct allegations ====
In November 2024, it was reported by various news outlets that Golden had been accused of sexual harassment and stalking by an unconfirmed number of women, including students, and became the subject of a Title IX investigation with the University of Florida. The complaint alleged that Golden sent illicit photos and stalked women to various locations. Golden released a statement regarding the allegations, noting that he has sought legal counsel to bring potential defamation claims against undisclosed involved parties.

On January 27, 2025, the University of Florida announced that they concluded their investigation of Golden, finding no evidence of any Title IX violations after a “thorough investigation that included dozens of interviews."

== Personal life ==
Golden is Jewish, and is a dual citizen of the United States and Israel, acquiring the latter to improve his chances of playing professionally in that country. He is married to former Saint Mary's volleyball player Megan York, with whom he has two children.

== Head coaching record ==
Record table
Season	Team	Overall	Conference	Standing	Postseason
San Francisco Dons (West Coast Conference) (2019–2022)
2019–20	San Francisco	22–12	9–7	5th	
2020–21	San Francisco	11–14	4–9	8th	
2021–22	San Francisco	24–10	10–6	4th	NCAA Division I Round of 64
San Francisco:		57–36 (.613)	23–22 (.511)		
Florida Gators (Southeastern Conference) (2022–present)
2022–23	Florida	16–17	9–9	8th	NIT First Round
2023–24	Florida	24–12	11–7	6th	NCAA Division I Round of 64
2024–25	Florida	36–4	14–4	2nd	NCAA Division I Champion
2025–26	Florida	27–8	16–2	1st	NCAA Division I Round of 32
2026–27	Florida	5–1	0–0		
Florida:		108–42 (.720)	50–22 (.694)		
Total:		165–78 (.679)			
National champion Postseason invitational champion Conference regular season champion Conference regular season and conference tournament champion Division regular season champion Division regular season and conference tournament champion Conference tournament champion
