= 2025 SEC men's basketball tournament =

- Classification: Division I
- Season: 2024–25
- Teams: 16
- Site: Bridgestone Arena; Nashville, Tennessee
- Champions: Florida (5th title)
- Winning coach: Todd Golden (1st title)
- MVP: Walter Clayton Jr. (Florida)
- Attendance: 131,991
- Television: SEC Network, ESPN

2024–25 Southeastern Conference men's basketball standings
	Conf.				Overall
Team	W		L	PCT	W		L	PCT
No. 4 Auburn	15	–	3	.833	32	–	6	.842
No. 1 Florida †	14	–	4	.778	36	–	4	.900
No. 6 Alabama	13	–	5	.722	28	–	9	.757
No. 5 Tennessee	12	–	6	.667	30	–	8	.789
No. 19 Texas A&M	11	–	7	.611	23	–	11	.676
No. 12 Kentucky	10	–	8	.556	24	–	12	.667
Missouri	10	–	8	.556	22	–	12	.647
No. 18 Ole Miss	10	–	8	.556	24	–	12	.667
No. 20 Arkansas	8	–	10	.444	22	–	14	.611
Mississippi State	8	–	10	.444	21	–	13	.618
Georgia	8	–	10	.444	20	–	13	.606
Vanderbilt	8	–	10	.444	20	–	13	.606
Texas	6	–	12	.333	19	–	16	.543
Oklahoma	6	–	12	.333	20	–	14	.588
LSU	3	–	15	.167	14	–	18	.438
South Carolina	2	–	16	.111	12	–	20	.375
† 2025 SEC tournament winner Rankings from AP poll

The 2025 SEC men's basketball tournament was a postseason men's basketball tournament for the 2024–25 season for the Southeastern Conference (SEC). The tournament was held from March 12–16, 2025, at Bridgestone Arena in Nashville, Tennessee. This was the first tournament since the conference expanded to 16 teams with the additions of Oklahoma and Texas. Florida won its fifth tournament and received an automatic bid to the 2025 NCAA tournament.

== Seeds ==
All 16 members of the SEC participated in the event, standing in contrast to the Big Ten and the ACC who excluded the three lowest seeds from their tournaments. Teams were seeded based on conference record. The top 4 seeds earned a double-bye to the quarterfinals, and seeds 5–8 earned a bye to the second round. Ties were broken by head-to-head results, then results vs. the top-seed and going on down until the tie was broken.

Seed	School	Conference record	Tiebreaker 1	Tiebreak 2
1	Auburn	15–3		
2	Florida	14–4		
3	Alabama	13–5		
4	Tennessee	12–6		
5	Texas A&M	11–7		
6	Kentucky	10–8	1–0 vs. Florida	1–0 vs. Missouri
7	Missouri	10–8	1–0 vs. Florida	0–1 vs. Kentucky
8	Ole Miss	10–8	0–1 vs. Florida	
9	Arkansas	8–10	3–0 vs. MSST/UGA/VAND	
10	Mississippi State	8–10	2–1 vs. ARK/UGA/VAND	
11	Georgia	8–10	1–2 vs. ARK/MSST/VAND	
12	Vanderbilt	8–10	0–3 vs. ARK/MSST/UGA	
13	Texas	6–12	1–1 vs. Texas A&M	
14	Oklahoma	6–12	0–2 vs. Texas A&M	
15	LSU	3–15		
16	South Carolina	2–16		

== Schedule ==
Game	Time	Matchup	Score	Television	Attendance
First round – Wednesday, March 12
1	12:00 pm	No. 9 Arkansas vs. No. 16 South Carolina	72–68	SECN	13,840
2	2:30 pm	No. 12 Vanderbilt vs. No. 13 Texas	72–79	SECN	13,840
3	6:00 pm	No. 10 Mississippi State vs. No. 15 LSU	91–62	SECN	13,912
4	8:30 pm	No. 11 Georgia vs. No. 14 Oklahoma	75–81	SECN	13,912
Second round – Thursday, March 13
5	12:00 pm	No. 8 Ole Miss vs. No. 9 Arkansas	83–80	SECN	13,558
6	2:30 pm	No. 5 Texas A&M vs. No. 13 Texas	89–94^{2OT}	SECN	13,558
7	6:00 pm	No. 7 Missouri vs. No. 10 Mississippi State	85–73	SECN	16,347
8	8:30 pm	No. 6 Kentucky vs. No. 14 Oklahoma	85–84	SECN	16,347
Quarterfinals – Friday, March 14
9	12:00 pm	No. 1 Auburn vs. No. 8 Ole Miss	62–57	ESPN	17,526
10	2:30 pm	No. 4 Tennessee vs. No. 13 Texas	83–72	ESPN	17,526
11	6:00 pm	No. 2 Florida vs. No. 7 Missouri	95–81	SECN	18,608
12	8:30 pm	No. 3 Alabama vs. No. 6 Kentucky	99–70	SECN	18,608
Semifinals – Saturday, March 15
13	12:00 pm	No. 1 Auburn vs. No. 4 Tennessee	65–70	ESPN	19,049
14	2:30 pm	No. 2 Florida vs. No. 3 Alabama	104–82	ESPN	19,049
Championship – Sunday, March 16
15	12:00 pm	No. 4 Tennessee vs. No. 2 Florida	77–86	ESPN	19,151
Game times in CDT. Rankings denote tournament seeding.

== Bracket ==
* – denotes overtime

First round Wednesday, March 12; SEC Network
9	Arkansas	72
16	South Carolina	68
12	Vanderbilt	72
13	Texas	79
10	Mississippi State	91
15	LSU	62
11	Georgia	75
14	Oklahoma	81

Second round Thursday, March 13; SEC Network
8	Ole Miss	83
9	Arkansas	80
5	Texas A&M	89
13	Texas	94**
7	Missouri	85
10	Mississippi State	73
6	Kentucky	85
14	Oklahoma	84

Quarterfinals; Friday, March 14; ESPN/SEC Network
1	Auburn	62
8	Ole Miss	57
4	Tennessee	83
13	Texas	72
2	Florida	95
7	Missouri	81
3	Alabama	99
6	Kentucky	70

Semifinals; Saturday, March 15; ESPN
1	Auburn	65
4	Tennessee	70
2	Florida	104
3	Alabama	82

Championship; Sunday, March 16; ESPN
4	Tennessee	77
2	Florida	86

== Game summaries ==
=== First round ===
SECN

March 12
12:00 p.m.

Report

No. 9 Arkansas 72, No. 16 South Carolina 68
Scoring by half: 47–30, 25–38
Pts: T. Brazile, 16; Rebs: J. Aidoo, 11; Asts: D. Wagner, 6	Pts: C. Murray-Boyles, 20; Rebs: C. Murray-Boyles, 12; Asts: J. Wright, 4

Bridgestone Arena
Nashville, TN
Attendance: 13,840
Referees: Owen Shortt, Courtney Green, Chuck Jones

SECN

March 12
2:30 p.m.

Report

No. 12 Vanderbilt 72, No. 13 Texas 79
Scoring by half: 26–41, 46–38
Pts: J. Edwards, 20; Rebs: D. McGlockton, 10; Asts: C. Manon, 4	Pts: 2 tied, 19; Rebs: J. Kent, 10; Asts: 2 tied, 2

Bridgestone Arena
Nashville, TN
Attendance: 13,840
Referees: Doug Shows, Olandis Poole, Vladimir Voyard-Tadal

SECN

March 12
6:00 p.m.

Report

No. 10 Mississippi State 91, No. 15 LSU 62
Scoring by half: 44–24, 47–38
Pts: J. Hubbard, 26; Rebs: 2 tied, 6 Asts: D. Warren, 4	Pts: J. Sears, 20; Rebs: C. Carter, 6 Asts: C. Givens III, 3

Bridgestone Arena
Nashville, TN
Attendance: 13,912
Referees: K.B. Burdett Jr., Byron Jarrett, Wil Howard

SECN

March 12
8:30 p.m.

Report

No. 11 Georgia 75, No. 14 Oklahoma 81
Scoring by half: 39–43, 36–38
Pts: S. Demary Jr., 24; Rebs: A. Newell, 17; Asts: D. James, 4	Pts: J. Fears, 29; Rebs: M. Wague, 9 Asts: M. Wague, 4

Bridgestone Arena
Nashville, TN
Attendance: 13,912
Referees: Pat Adams, Jeb Hartness, Todd Austin

=== Second round ===
SECN

March 13
12:00 p.m.

Report

No. 8 Ole Miss 83, No. 9 Arkansas 80
Scoring by half: 42–34, 41–46
Pts: M. Dia, 19; Rebs: 2 tied, 8 Asts: J. Murray, 5	Pts: J. Aidoo, 17; Rebs: T. Brazile, 11; Asts: 2 tied, 4

Bridgestone Arena
Nashville, TN
Attendance: 13,558
Referees: Don Daily, Olandis Poole, Wil Howard

SECN

March 13
2:30 p.m.

Report

No. 5 Texas A&M 89, No. 13 Texas 94 (OT)
Scoring by half: 27–33, 46–40 Overtime: 6–6, 10–15
Pts: W. Taylor IV, 29; Rebs: H. Coleman III, 13; Asts: W. Taylor IV, 3	Pts: T. Johnson, 20; Rebs: J. Pope, 8 Asts: T. Mark, 5

Bridgestone Arena
Nashville, TN
Attendance: 13,558
Referees: Joe Lindsay, Steven Anderson, Todd Austin

SECN

March 13
6:00 p.m.

Report

No. 7 Missouri 85, No. 10 Mississippi State 73
Scoring by half: 39–34, 46–39
Pts: T. Bates, 25; Rebs: J. Gray, 12; Asts: 2 tied, 4	Pts: J. Hubbard, 24; Rebs: K. Murphy, 8 Asts: R. Kugel, 4

Bridgestone Arena
Nashville, TN
Attendance: 16,347
Referees: Bart Lenox, Jeb Hartness, Vladimir Voyard-Tadal

SECN

March 13
8:30 p.m.

No. 6 Kentucky 85, No. 14 Oklahoma 84
Scoring by half: 40–38, 45–46
Pts: O. Oweh, 27; Rebs: A. Carr, 7 Asts: O. Oweh, 5	Pts: J. Fears, 28; Rebs: J. Moore, 7 Asts: J. Fears, 5

Bridgestone Arena
Nashville, TN
Attendance: 16,347
Referees: Terry Oglesby, Owen Shortt, Courtney Green

=== Quarterfinals ===
ESPN

March 14
12:00 p.m.

Report

No. 1 Auburn 62, No. 8 Ole Miss 57
Scoring by half: 29–22, 33–35
Pts: J. Broome, 23; Rebs: J. Broome, 15; Asts: C. Baker-Mazara, 6	Pts: 2 tied, 12; Rebs: M. Dia, 7 Asts: 2 tied, 2

Bridgestone Arena
Nashville, TN
Attendance: 17,526
Referees: Pat Adams, Bart Lenox, Steven Anderson

ESPN

March 14
2:30 p.m.

Report

No. 4 Tennessee 83, No. 13 Texas 72
Scoring by half: 41–38, 42–34
Pts: C. Lanier, 23; Rebs: 2 tied, 7 Asts: Z. Zeigler, 6	Pts: 2 tied, 14; Rebs: K. Shedrick, 6 Asts: T. Mark, 3

Bridgestone Arena
Nashville, TN
Attendance: 17,526
Referees: Don Daily, Owen Shortt, Byron Jarrett

SECN

March 14
6:00 p.m.

Report

No. 2 Florida 95, No. 7 Missouri 81
Scoring by half: 50–37, 45–44
Pts: W. Clayton Jr., 18; Rebs: A. Condon, 8 Asts: W. Clayton Jr., 6	Pts: T. Bates, 16; Rebs: T. Perkins, 4 Asts: 2 tied, 3

Bridgestone Arena
Nashville, TN
Attendance: 18,608
Referees: Terry Oglesby, Courtney Green, Jeb Hartness

SECN

March 14
8:30 p.m.

Report

No. 3 Alabama 99, No. 6 Kentucky 70
Scoring by half: 45–38, 54–32
Pts: L. Philon, 21; Rebs: M. Dioubate, 8 Asts: 3 tied, 4	Pts: A. Carr, 18; Rebs: A. Williams, 7 Asts: A. Williams, 4

Bridgestone Arena
Nashville, TN
Attendance: 18,608
Referees: Joe Lindsay, Doug Shows, K.B. Burdett Jr.

=== Semifinals ===
ESPN

March 15
12:00 p.m.

Report

No. 1 Auburn 65, No. 4 Tennessee 70
Scoring by half: 33–32, 32–38
Pts: J. Broome, 23; Rebs: J. Broome, 7 Asts: 2 tied, 3	Pts: Z. Zeigler, 20; Rebs: F. Okpara, 9 Asts: Z. Zeigler, 4

Bridgestone Arena
Nashville, TN
Attendance: 19,049
Referees: Pat Adams, Don Daily, K.B. Burdett Jr.

ESPN

March 15
2:30 p.m.

Report

No. 2 Florida 104, No. 3 Alabama 82
Scoring by half: 47–45, 57–37
Pts: W. Clayton Jr., 22; Rebs: 2 tied, 10; Asts: W. Clayton Jr., 10	Pts: C. Youngblood, 14; Rebs: M. Dioubate, 12; Asts: L. Philon, 5

Bridgestone Arena
Nashville, TN
Attendance: 19,049
Referees: Terry Oglesby, Bart Lenox, Steven Anderson

=== Championship ===
ESPN

March 16
12:00 p.m.

Report

No. 4 Tennessee 77, No. 2 Florida 86
Scoring by half: 30–39, 47–47
Pts: J. Gainey, 24; Rebs: J. Mashack, 6 Asts: Z. Zeigler, 8	Pts: W. Clayton Jr., 22; Rebs: A. Condon, 9 Asts: W. Richard, 3

Bridgestone Arena
Nashville, TN
Attendance: 19,151
Referees: Joe Lindsay, Doug Shows, Byron Jarrett
