= Walter Clayton Jr. =

American basketball player (born 2003)

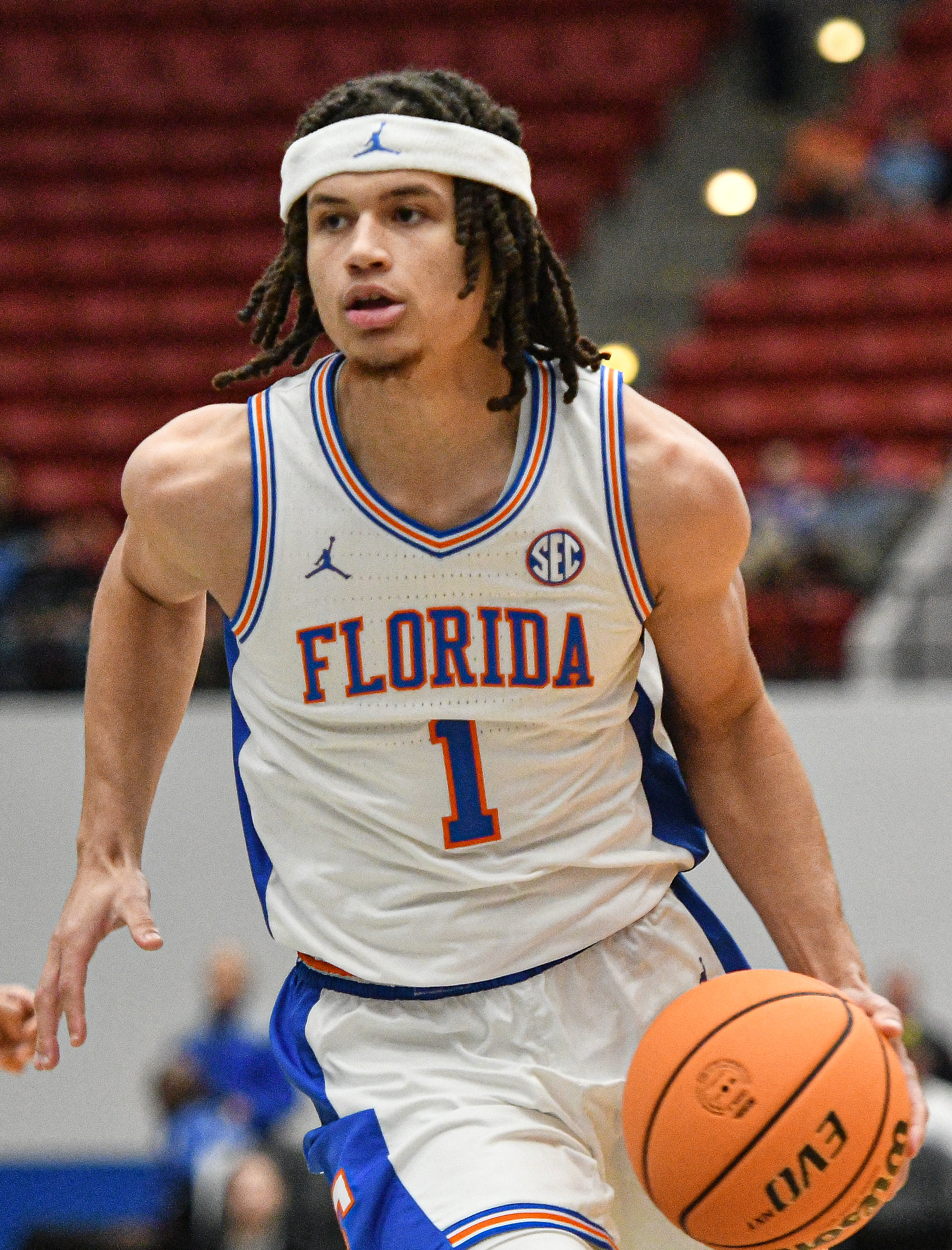
- Clayton with Florida in 2023

No. 1 – Dallas Mavericks
- Position: Point guard / shooting guard
- League: NBA

Personal information
- Born: March 6, 2003 (age 23) Sebring, Florida, U.S.
- Listed height: 6 ft 3 in (1.91 m)
- Listed weight: 195 lb (88 kg)

Career information
- High school: Lake Wales (Lake Wales, Florida); Bartow (Bartow, Florida)
- College: Iona (2021–2023); Florida (2023–2025)
- NBA draft: 2025: 1st round, 18th overall pick
- Drafted by: Washington Wizards
- Playing career: 2025–present

Career history
- 2025–2026: Utah Jazz
- 2025: →Salt Lake City Stars
- 2026: Memphis Grizzlies
- 2026–present: Dallas Mavericks
- 2026–present: →Texas Legends

Career highlights
- NCAA champion (2025); NCAA Final Four Most Outstanding Player (2025); Consensus first-team All-American (2025); SEC Male Athlete of the Year (2025); First-team All-SEC (2025); Second-team All-SEC (2024); SEC Tournament MVP (2025); MAAC Player of the Year (2023); First-team All-MAAC (2023)
- Stats at NBA.com
- Stats at Basketball Reference

Walter Marterry Clayton Jr. (born March 6, 2003) is an American professional basketball player for the Dallas Mavericks of the National Basketball Association (NBA), on a two-way contract with the Texas Legends of the NBA G League. He played college basketball for the Iona Gaels and the Florida Gators. With Florida, Clayton was a consensus first-team All-American in 2025 and was named the Final Four Most Outstanding Player (MOP) after leading Florida to a national championship victory.

== Early life and high school career ==
Clayton was born in Sebring, Florida, on March 6, 2003. He is the son of Cherie Ann Quarg, who played softball and basketball at Frostproof Middle-Senior High School and Walter Clayton Sr., who played basketball and football at Frostproof.

His family moved to Lake Wales, Florida, when he was 10. Clayton Jr. initially attended Lake Wales High School, where he played football and basketball. In basketball, he averaged 17.5 points, five rebounds, and 3.2 assists as a sophomore. Clayton transferred to Bartow High School after his sophomore year. He averaged 15.4 points, 4.3 assists, 4.3 rebounds, and 2.3 steals per game during his first season at Bartow as the Yellow Jackets won the Florida Class 6A state championship. Clayton committed to playing college basketball for Iona over offers from East Carolina, Florida A&M, Charleston, Stetson, and James Madison.

Clayton was considered a better college prospect in football and began playing the sport as a freshman in high school at the urging of his childhood friend, Gervon Dexter. He had offers to play football from Florida, Notre Dame, Tennessee, Nebraska, and West Virginia.

== College career ==
=== Iona (2021–2023) ===
Clayton averaged 7.3 points per game during his freshman season at Iona. He was named the Metro Atlantic Athletic Conference (MAAC) Player of the Year as a sophomore after averaging 16.8 points, 4.3 rebounds, and 3.2 assists per game during the regular season. After the season, Clayton entered the NCAA transfer portal.

=== Florida (2023–2025) ===
Clayton ultimately transferred to the Florida Gators. He also had considered transferring to St. John's and playing for his former Iona head coach, Rick Pitino.

In his first season at Florida, Clayton averaged 17.6 points, 3.6 rebounds, and 2.6 assists and was honored as Second-Team All-SEC. He played an instrumental role in getting the Gators to the SEC Tournament Championship for the first time in 10 years and the NCAA Tournament for the first time in 3 years. Despite the loss, Clayton had 33 points in a historic performance against Colorado in the 2024 NCAA Tournament.

After the 2023–24 season, Clayton declared for the NBA Draft. However, he ended up withdrawing from the draft and returning to Florida for his senior season. It was during this season that Clayton had one of the best individual seasons in Florida basketball history. He led Florida to a 27–4 record in the regular season while averaging 17.2 points, 4.3 assists, and 3.8 rebounds. During this season, Clayton led Florida to wins over No. 1 Tennessee and at No. 1 Auburn, which was the first time Florida had ever beaten a No. 1 on the road. He also helped lead Florida to its best overall record and SEC record in 11 years. After the regular season, Clayton was honored as first-team All-SEC selection. On March 18, 2025, Clayton was named a first-team All American.

Clayton went on to lead the Gators to the national championship, making a crucial defensive closeout, causing Houston's Emanuel Sharp to pump-fake on a potential game-winning three-pointer and lose his dribble. Clayton's teammate Alex Condon pounced on the loose ball to seal the Gators' third national championship in program history and first since 2007. Clayton was named the Most Outstanding Player (MOP). After the season, Clayton was named the SEC Male Athlete of the Year, making him the first Florida basketball player to receive this honor.

== Professional career ==
=== Utah Jazz (2025–2026) ===
On June 25, 2025, Clayton was selected with the 18th overall pick by the Washington Wizards in the first round of the 2025 NBA draft and subsequently traded to the Utah Jazz for the draft rights to Jamir Watkins and Will Riley. On July 2, Clayton signed with the Jazz alongside Ace Bailey. On October 22, Clayton made his NBA debut with the Jazz, recording ten points, six rebounds, five assists and two steals in a 129–108 win over the Los Angeles Clippers. On December 7, he scored a career-high 20 points, alongside nine assists, in a 131–101 loss against the Oklahoma City Thunder.

Clayton made 45 appearances for Utah during the 2025–26 season, averaging 6.8 points, 2.0 rebounds, and 5.5 assists.

=== Memphis Grizzlies (2026) ===
On February 3, 2026, Clayton, Kyle Anderson, Taylor Hendricks, Georges Niang, and three first-round draft picks were traded to the Memphis Grizzlies in exchange for Jaren Jackson Jr., John Konchar, Jock Landale, and Vince Williams Jr. On February 6, Clayton made his debut with the Grizzlies, scoring 11 points, and tallying up three rebounds, four assists, and a steal in a 135–115 loss against the Portland Trail Blazers. On April 5, he matched his career-high of 20 points, alongside three rebounds and four assists, in a 131–115 loss against the Milwaukee Bucks.

On October 19, Clayton was waived by the Grizzlies as part of final roster cuts during training camp.

=== Dallas Mavericks (2026–present) ===
On October 21, 2026, Clayton signed a two-way contract with the Dallas Mavericks.

== Personal life ==
Clayton and his girlfriend, Tatiyana Burney, had a daughter in December 2023.

== Career statistics ==
Legend
GP	Games played	GS	Games started	MPG	Minutes per game
FG%	Field goal percentage	3P%	3-point field goal percentage	FT%	Free throw percentage
RPG	Rebounds per game	APG	Assists per game	SPG	Steals per game
BPG	Blocks per game	PPG	Points per game	**Bold**	Career high

*	Led NCAA Division I

=== NBA ===
Year	Team	GP	GS	MPG	FG%	3P%	FT%	RPG	APG	SPG	BPG	PPG
2025–26	Utah	**45**	0	18.0	**.398**	**.308**	**.935**	2.0	3.2	.5	**.3**	6.8
2025–26	Memphis	24	**6**	**25.0**	.366	.307	.864	**2.1**	**5.7**	**.8**	**.3**	**9.7**
Career		69	6	20.4	.384	.307	.901	2.0	4.0	.6	.3	7.8

=== College ===
Year	Team	GP	GS	MPG	FG%	3P%	FT%	RPG	APG	SPG	BPG	PPG
2021–22	Iona	32	4	16.1	.434	.357	.787	2.2	1.6	.8	.3	7.3
2022–23	Iona	32	31	30.3	**.455**	**.431**	**.953***	**4.3**	3.2	**1.8**	**.6**	16.8
2023–24	Florida	36	36	30.9	.432	.365	.877	3.6	2.6	1.1	**.6**	17.6
2024–25	Florida	**39**	**39**	**32.6**	.448	.386	.875	3.7	**4.2**	1.2	.5	**18.3**
Career		139	110	27.8	.444	.386	.879	3.4	2.9	1.2	.5	15.2
