= 2024–25 Southeastern Conference men's basketball season =

- League: NCAA Division I
- Sport: Basketball
- Teams: 16
- TV partner(s): ESPN, SEC Network

Regular season
- Season champions: Auburn Tigers
- Season MVP: Johni Broome, Auburn

SEC tournament
- Venue: Bridgestone Arena, Nashville, Tennessee
- Champions: Florida
- Runners-up: Tennessee
- Finals MVP: Walter Clayton Jr. (Florida)

SEC men's basketball seasons
- ← 2023–24 2025–26 →

2024–25 Southeastern Conference men's basketball standings
	Conf.				Overall
Team	W		L	PCT	W		L	PCT
No. 4 Auburn	15	–	3	.833	32	–	6	.842
No. 1 Florida †	14	–	4	.778	36	–	4	.900
No. 6 Alabama	13	–	5	.722	28	–	9	.757
No. 5 Tennessee	12	–	6	.667	30	–	8	.789
No. 19 Texas A&M	11	–	7	.611	23	–	11	.676
No. 12 Kentucky	10	–	8	.556	24	–	12	.667
Missouri	10	–	8	.556	22	–	12	.647
No. 18 Ole Miss	10	–	8	.556	24	–	12	.667
No. 20 Arkansas	8	–	10	.444	22	–	14	.611
Mississippi State	8	–	10	.444	21	–	13	.618
Georgia	8	–	10	.444	20	–	13	.606
Vanderbilt	8	–	10	.444	20	–	13	.606
Texas	6	–	12	.333	19	–	16	.543
Oklahoma	6	–	12	.333	20	–	14	.588
LSU	3	–	15	.167	14	–	18	.438
South Carolina	2	–	16	.111	12	–	20	.375
† 2025 SEC tournament winner Rankings from AP poll

The 2024–25 Southeastern Conference men's basketball season began with practices in October followed by the 2024–25 NCAA Division I men's basketball season, which started on November 3, 2024. Conference play began on January 4, 2025, and ended in March, after which the 16 member teams participated in the 2025 SEC men's basketball tournament at Bridgestone Arena in Nashville, Tennessee. Tournament champion Florida received the conference's automatic bid to the 2025 NCAA tournament, where they would go on to win the tournament following a 65–63 win over Houston in the national championship game.

This was the first season with 16 members of the conference as Texas and Oklahoma joined the conference before the start of the 2024–25.

The league set a record for most schools sent to the NCAA tournament, with 14 out of the league's 16 members granted bids to the tournament.

== Pre-season ==
=== Recruiting classes ===
Rankings
Team	ESPN	Rivals	On3 Recruits	247 Sports	Signees
Alabama		No. 3	No. 3	No. 2	4
Arkansas		No. 5	No. 2	No. 3	3
Auburn		No. 24	No. 15	No. 31	2
Florida		No. 64	–	–	2
Georgia		No. 10	No. 12	No. 10	4
LSU		No. 13	No. 13	No. 14	4
Kentucky		No. 51	No. 44	No. 45	2
Missouri		No. 6	No. 14	No. 5	5
Mississippi State		No. 70	–	No. 47	2
Oklahoma		No. 30	No. 41	No. 25	3
Ole Miss		No. 75	No. 45	–	1
South Carolina		No. 44	No. 46	–	2
Tennessee		No. 73	No. 43	–	1
Texas		No. 16	No. 26	No. 17	2
Texas A&M		No. 57	No. 39	No. 30	2
Vanderbilt		No. 82	–	–	2

=== Preseason watchlists ===
Below is a table of notable preseason watch lists.

Player	Wooden	Naismith	Cousy	West	Erving	Malone	Abdul-Jabbar	Olson
Jonas Aidoo, Arkansas							✓	
Chad Baker-Mazara, Auburn					✓			
Johni Broome, Auburn	✓	✓				✓		✓
Walter Clayton Jr., Florida	✓	✓	✓					✓
Johnell Davis, Arkansas	✓	✓		✓				✓
Malik Dia, Ole Miss							✓	
Darlinstone Dubar, Tennessee								✓
Boogie Fland, Arkansas				✓				
Josh Hubbard, Mississippi State	✓		✓					✓
Tre Johnson, Texas		✓		✓				
Arthur Kaluma, Texas					✓			
Chaz Lanier, Tennessee				✓				
Mark Mitchell, Missouri					✓			
Collin Murray-Boyles, South Carolina								✓
Matthew Murrell, Ole Miss	✓	✓		✓				✓
Grant Nelson, Alabama	✓	✓				✓		✓
Cliff Omoruyi, Alabama	✓						✓	✓
Jordan Pope, Texas			✓					
Jaxson Robinson, Kentucky	✓	✓			✓			✓
Mark Sears, Alabama	✓	✓	✓					✓
Wade Taylor IV, Texas A&M	✓	✓	✓					✓
Amari Williams, Kentucky							✓	
Zakai Zeigler, Tennessee	✓	✓	✓					✓

=== Preseason All-American teams ===
Player	AP	CBS	Fox Sports
Mark Sears, Alabama	1st team	1st team	1st team
Johni Broome, Auburn	1st team	2nd team	2nd team
Wade Taylor IV, Texas A&M	RV	3rd team	3rd team
Johnell Davis, Arkansas	RV	3rd team	3rd team
Tre Johnson, Texas	RV		

=== Preseason polls ===
	AP	Blue Ribbon	CBS Sports	Coaches	ESPN	Fox Sports	KenPom	NCAA Sports	Sports; Illustrated
Alabama	No. 2	No. 1	No. 2	–	No. 2	No. 3	No. 4	No. 1	No. 1
Arkansas	No. 16	No. 15	No. 13	–	No. 14	No. 13	No. 25	No. 13	No. 21
Auburn	No. 11	No. 12	No. 10	–	No. 11	No. 15	No. 3	No. 15	No. 10
Florida	No. 21	No. 18	No. 22	–	No. 21	–	No. 28	No. 20	No. 18
Georgia	–	–	–	–	–	–	No. 67	–	–
Kentucky	No. 23	No. 19	–	–	No. 23	No. 22	No. 42	No. 14	No. 23
LSU	–	–	–	–	–	–	No. 51	–	–
Missouri	–	–	–	–	–	–	No. 53	–	–
Mississippi State	RV	–	–	–	–	–	No. 32	–	–
Oklahoma	–	–	–	–	–	–	No. 40	–	–
Ole Miss	No. 24	–	–	–	No. 20	No. 24	No. 47	No. 33	No. 17
South Carolina	–	–	–	–	–	–	No. 65	–	–
Tennessee	No. 12	No. 11	No. 14	–	No. 13	No. 11	No. 13	No. 12	No. 12
Texas	No. 19	No. 24	No. 20	–	No. 22	–	No. 18	No. 27	–
Texas A&M	No. 13	No. 9	No. 11	–	No. 12	No. 20	No. 16	No. 22	No. 24
Vanderbilt	–	–	–	–	–	–	No. 96	–	–

=== SEC media days ===
The SEC conducted its 2024 SEC media days in Birmingham, Alabama on October 15 & 16, 2024 on the SEC Network.

The teams and representatives in respective order are as follows:

- Alabama – Nate Oats (HC), Mark Sears & Latrell Wrightsell Jr.
- Arkansas – John Calipari (HC), Johnell Davis & Adou Thiero
- Auburn – Bruce Pearl (HC), Johni Broome & Denver Jones
- Florida – Todd Golden (HC), Walter Clayton Jr. & Alijah Martin
- Georgia – Mike White (HC), Silas Demary Jr. & RJ Godfrey
- Kentucky – Mark Pope (HC), Lamont Butler & Jaxson Robinson
- LSU – Matt McMahon (HC), Cam Carter & Jalen Reed
- Oklahoma – Porter Moser (HC), Sam Godwin & Jalon Moore
- Ole Miss – Chris Beard (HC), Jaylen Murray & Sean Pedulla
- Mississippi State – Chris Jans (HC), Josh Hubbard & Cameron Matthews
- Missouri – Dennis Gates (HC), Mark Mitchell & Tony Perkins
- South Carolina – Lamont Paris (HC), Collin Murray-Boyles & Nick Pringl
- Tennessee – Rick Barnes (HC), Jahmai Mashack & Zakai Zeigler
- Texas – Rodney Terry (HC), Tre Johnson & Kadin Shedrick
- Texas A&M – Buzz Williams (HC), Anderson Garcia & Hayden Hefner
- Vanderbilt – Mark Byington (HC), AJ Hoggard & Tyler Nickel

Men's Basketball Preseason Poll
Place	Team
1.	Alabama
2.	Auburn
3.	Tennessee
4.	Arkansas
5.	Texas A&M
6.	Florida
7.	Texas
8.	Kentucky
9.	Ole Miss
10.	Mississippi State
11.	South Carolina
12.	Georgia
13.	Missouri
14.	LSU
15.	Oklahoma
16.	Vanderbilt

=== SEC Preseason All-Conference ===
First Team

Name	School	Pos.	Yr.	Ht., Wt.	Hometown (Last School)
Johni Broome	Auburn	F	Sr.	6′ 10″, 240	Plant City, FL
Walter Clayton Jr.	Florida	G	Sr.	6′ 3″, 195	Lake Wales, FL
Mark Sears	Alabama	G	Gr	6′ 5″, 205	Muscle Shoals, AL
Wade Taylor IV	Texas A&M	G	Sr.	6′ 0″, 175	Dallas, TX
Zakai Zeigler	Tennessee	G	Sr.	5′ 9″, 171	Long Island, NY

Second Team

Name	School	Pos.	Yr.	Ht., Wt.	Hometown (Last School)
Jonas Aidoo	Arkansas	F	Gr	6′ 11″, 240	Durham, NC
Johnell Davis	Arkansas	G	Gr	6′ 4″, 205	Gary, IN
Josh Hubbard	Mississippi State	G	So.	5′ 11″, 190	Madison, MS
Matthew Murrell	Ole Miss	G	Sr.	6′ 4″, 205	Memphis, TN
Grant Nelson	Alabama	F	Sr.	6′ 1″, 230	Devils Lake, ND

Third Team

Name	School	Pos.	Yr.	Ht., Wt.	Hometown (Last School)
Collin Murray-Boyles	South Carolina	F	So.	6′ 8″, 245	Columbia, S.C.
Alex Condon	Florida	C	So.	6′ 11″, 230	Perth, Australia
Tramon Mark	Texas	G	Gr	6′ 5″, 200	Dickinson, TX
Chad Baker-Mazara	Auburn	F	Jr.	6′ 5″, 180	Santo Domingo, Dominican Republic
Jaxson Robinson	Kentucky	G		6′ 6″, 192	Ada, OK

=== Midseason watchlists ===
Below is a table of notable midseason watch lists.

Player	Wooden	Naismith	Naismith DPOY	Robertson	Cousy	West	Erving	Malone	Abdul-Jabbar
Chad Baker-Mazara						✓			
Johni Broome	✓	✓	✓	✓				✓	
Lamont Butler			✓	✓					
Walter Clayton Jr.	✓	✓		✓	✓				
Jeremiah Fears	✓								
Josh Hubbard	✓			✓					
Tre Johnson	✓	✓				✓			
Chaz Lanier	✓	✓		✓		✓			
Alijah Martin					✓				
Jahmai Mashack			✓						
Cameron Matthews			✓						
Jalon Moore						✓			
Collin Murray-Boyles				✓					
Asa Newell				✓					✓
Clifford Omoruyi			✓						
Otega Oweh				✓					
Zhuric Phelps				✓					
Jaxson Robinson						✓			
Mark Sears	✓	✓		✓	✓				
Wade Taylor IV	✓								
Zakai Zeigler	✓	✓	✓	✓	✓				

== Regular season ==
The schedule was released in late October. Before the season, it was announced that for the seventh consecutive season, all regular-season conference games and conference tournament games would be broadcast nationally by ESPN Inc. family of networks including ABC, ESPN, ESPN2, ESPNU, and the SEC Network.

=== Multi-team tournaments ===
Team	Tournament	Finish
Alabama	Players Era Festival	2nd
Arkansas	−	−
Auburn	Maui Invitational	1st
Florida	ESPN Events Invitational	1st
Georgia	−	−
Kentucky	−	−
LSU	Greenbrier Tip-Off	3rd
Missouri	−	−
Mississippi State	Arizona Tip-Off	2nd
Oklahoma	Battle 4 Atlantis	1st
Ole Miss	Rady Children's Invitational	2nd
South Carolina	Fort Myers Tip-Off	3rd
Tennessee	Bahamas Championship	1st
Texas	Legends Classic	1st
Texas A&M	Players Era Festival	5th
Vanderbilt	Charleston Classic	2nd

=== ACC–SEC Challenge ===
Date	Visitor	Home	Site	Significance	Score	Conference record
Dec. 3	South Carolina	Boston College	Conte Forum • Chestnut Hill, Massachusetts	ACC–SEC Challenge	73–51	1–0
Dec. 3	Notre Dame	Georgia	Stegeman Coliseum • Athens, Georgia	ACC–SEC Challenge	48–69	2–0
Dec. 3	California	Missouri	Mizzou Arena • Columbia, Missouri	ACC–SEC Challenge	93–98	3–0
Dec. 3	Arkansas	Miami (FL)	Watsco Center • Coral Gables, Florida	ACC–SEC Challenge	76–73	4–0
Dec. 3	Syracuse	No.3 Tennessee	Thompson–Boling Arena • Knoxville, Tennessee	ACC–SEC Challenge	70–96	5–0
Dec. 3	Wake Forest	No. 22 Texas A&M	Reed Arena • College Station, Texas	ACC–SEC Challenge	44–57	6–0
Dec. 3	Florida State	LSU	Pete Maravich Assembly Center • Baton Rouge, Louisiana	ACC–SEC Challenge	75–85	7–0
Dec. 3	Georgia Tech	No. 21 Oklahoma	Lloyd Noble Center • Norman, Oklahoma	ACC–SEC Challenge	61–76	8–0
Dec. 3	No. 23 Ole Miss	Louisville	KFC Yum! Center • Louisville, Kentucky	ACC–SEC Challenge	86–63	9–0
Dec. 3	No. 4 Kentucky	Clemson	Littlejohn Coliseum • Clemson, South Carolina	ACC–SEC Challenge	66–70	9–1
Dec. 4	Alabama	North Carolina	Dean Smith Center • Chapel Hill, North Carolina	ACC–SEC Challenge	94–79	10–1
Dec. 4	Virginia	Florida	O'Connell Center • Gainesville, Florida	ACC–SEC Challenge	87–69	11–1
Dec. 4	Auburn	Duke	Cameron Indoor Stadium • Durham, North Carolina	ACC–SEC Challenge	78–84	11–2
Dec. 4	Texas	NC State	Lenovo Center • Raleigh, North Carolina	ACC–SEC Challenge	63–59	12–2
Dec. 4	Pittsburgh	Mississippi State	Humphrey Coliseum • Mississippi State, Mississippi	ACC–SEC Challenge	90–57	13–2
Dec. 4	Vanderbilt	Virginia Tech	Cassell Coliseum • Blacksburg, Virginia	ACC–SEC Challenge	80–64	14–2

Team rankings are reflective of AP poll when the game was played, not current or final ranking

== Records vs other conferences ==
The SEC has a record of 184–24 in non-conference play for the 2024–25 season. Records shown for regular season only.

Regular season

Power 5 Conferences
Conference	Record
ACC	30–4
Big East	4–5
Big Ten	10–9
Big 12	14–2
Combined	58–20

Other Conferences
Conference	Record
America East	1–0
American	6-2
ASUN	17–1
Atlantic 10	2–0
Big Sky	2–0
Big South	2–0
Big West	0–0
Coastal	3–0
Conference USA	4–0
Horizon	2–0
Independents/Non-Division I	0–0
Ivy League	1–0
Metro Atlantic	0–0
Mid-American	4–0
Mid-Eastern Athletic	4–0
Missouri Valley	1-1
Mountain West	3–0
Northeast	3–0
Ohio Valley	8–0
Patriot	2–0
Southern	3–0
Southland	14–0
SWAC	20–0
Summit	3–0
Sun Belt	8–0
WCC	3–0
WAC	2–0
Combined	126–4

Thru December 31, 2024

=== Record against ranked non-conference opponents ===
This is a list of games against ranked opponents only (rankings from the AP Poll at time of the game):

Date	Visitor	Home	Site	Significance	Score	Conference record
Nov. 4			●	−	0−0	0−0

† denotes neutral site game

=== Conference schedule ===
This table summarizes the head-to-head results between teams in conference play.

	Alabama	Arkansas	Auburn	Florida	Georgia	Kentucky	LSU	Oklahoma	Ole Miss	Mississippi State	Missouri	South Carolina	Tennessee	Texas	Texas A&M	Vanderbilt
vs. Alabama	–	0–1	1–0	0–0	0–1	0–1	0–1	0–1	1–0	0–1	0–0	0–1	0–0	0–1	0–1	0–1
vs. Arkansas	1–0	–	0–0	1–0	0–1	0–1	1–1	1–0	1–0	0–0	1–0	0–0	1–0	0–1	1–0	0–0
vs. Auburn	0–1	0–0	–	1–0	0–1	0–0	0–1	0–1	0–1	0–1	0–1	0–1	0–1	0–1	0–0	0–1
vs. Florida	0–0	0–1	0–1	–	0–1	1–0	0–0	0–1	0–0	0–1	1–0	0–2	1–1	0–1	0–0	0–1
vs. Georgia	1–0	1–0	1–0	1–0	–	0–1	0–1	0–1	1–0	1–0	1–0	0–1	1–0	0–0	1–1	0–0
vs. Kentucky	1–0	1–0	0–0	0–1	1–0	–	0–0	0–0	1–0	0–1	0–0	0–1	0–2	1–0	0–0	1–0
vs. LSU	1–0	1–1	1–0	0–0	1–0	0–0	–	0–1	2–0	0–0	1–0	0–1	0–0	1–0	1–0	1–0
vs. Oklahoma	1–0	0–1	1–0	1–0	1–0	0–0	1–0	–	0–0	0–0	1–0	0–1	1–0	1–0	2–0	0–1
vs. Ole Miss	0–1	0–1	1–0	0–0	0–1	0–1	0–2	0–0	–	2–0	1–0	0–1	0–0	0–1	1–0	0–0
vs. Mississippi State	1–0	0–0	1–0	1–0	0–1	1–0	0–0	0–0	0–2	–	1–0	0–2	1–0	0–0	0–1	0–1
vs. Missouri	0–0	0–1	1–0	0–1	0–1	0–0	0–1	0–1	0–1	0–1	–	0–0	1–0	1–0	1–0	0–1
vs. South Carolina	1–0	0–0	1–0	2–0	1–0	1–0	1–0	1–0	1–0	2–0	0–0	–	0–0	0–0	1–0	1–0
vs. Tennessee	0–0	0–1	1–0	1–1	0–1	2–0	0–0	0–1	0–0	0–1	0–1	0–0	–	0–1	0–0	1–1
vs. Texas	1–0	1–0	1–0	1–0	0–0	0–1	0–1	0–1	1–0	0–0	0–1	0–0	1–0	–	1–1	1–0
vs. Texas A&M	1–0	0–1	0–0	0–0	0–1	1–0	0–1	0–2	0–1	1–0	0–1	0–1	0–0	1–1	–	0–0
vs. Vanderbilt	1–0	0–0	1–0	1–0	0–0	0–1	0–1	1–0	0–0	1–0	1–0	0–1	1–1	0–1	0–0	–
Total	10–2	4–8	11–1	10–3	4–9	6–6	3–10	3–10	8–5	7–6	8–4	0–13	8–5	5–8	9–4	5–7

Thru Feb. 19, 2025

=== Points scored ===
Team	For	Against	Difference
Alabama	2,258	1,978	280
Arkansas	1,841	1,654	187
Auburn	2,128	1,710	418
Florida	2,179	1,729	450
Georgia	1,950	1,773	177
Kentucky	2,148	1,907	241
LSU	1,992	1,878	114
Oklahoma	2,006	1,897	109
Ole Miss	2,023	1,792	231
Mississippi State	2,053	1,847	206
Missouri	2,065	1,724	341
South Carolina	1,809	1,843	-34
Tennessee	1,858	1,497	361
Texas	2,046	1,801	245
Texas A&M	1,917	1,704	213
Vanderbilt	1,934	1,733	201

Thru Feb. 19, 2025

== Rankings ==
*AP does not release post-NCAA tournament rankings

	Improvement in ranking
	Drop in ranking
	Not ranked previous week
RV	Received votes but were not ranked in Top 25
NV	No votes received

Team	Poll	Pre	Wk 2	Wk 3	Wk 4	Wk 5	Wk 6	Wk 7	Wk 8	Wk 9	Wk 10	Wk 11	Wk 12	Wk 13	Wk 14	Wk 15	Wk 16	Wk 17	Wk 18	Wk 19	Wk 20	Final
Alabama	AP	2	2	8	9	10	7	6	5	5	5	4	4	4	3	2	4	6	7	5	7	6
Alabama	C	2	2	7	9	12	8	7	6	6	5	5	3	4	3	1	4	6	8	8	8	6
Arkansas	AP	16	18	20	19	RV	RV	RV	RV	RV	RV	NV	NV	NV	NV	NV	NV	NV	NV	NV	NV	20
Arkansas	C	16	21	23	21	RV	RV	RV	RV	RV	RV	NV	NV	NV	NV	NV	NV	NV	NV	NV	NV	25
Auburn	AP	11	5	4	4	2	2	2	2	2	2	1	1	1	1	1	1	1	1	3	4	4
Auburn	C	11	4	3	3	2	2	2	2	2	2	1	1	1	1	2	1	1	1	3	4	4
Florida	AP	21	20	21	18	13	9	7	6	6	8	5	5	5	6	3	2	3	5	4	3	1
Florida	C	21	18	19	16	13	7	6	5	5	8	4	6	6	6	3	2	3	5	4	3	1
Georgia	AP	NV	NV	NV	RV	RV	RV	RV	RV	RV	RV	RV	RV	23	RV	NV	NV	NV	NV	NV	NV	NV
Georgia	C	NV	NV	NV	NV	RV	RV	RV	RV	RV	RV	23	RV	RV	NV	NV	NV	NV	NV	NV	NV	NV
Kentucky	AP	23	9	9	8	4	5	4	10	10	6	8	9	12	14	15	17	17	19	15	18	12
Kentucky	C	23	18	11	8	6	5	4	10	11	7	9	9	12	14	18	21	23	24	19	21	14
LSU	AP	NV	NV	NV	NV	NV	NV	NV	NV	NV	NV	NV	NV	NV	NV	NV	NV	NV	NV	NV	NV	NV
LSU	C	NV	NV	NV	NV	NV	NV	NV	NV	NV	NV	NV	NV	NV	NV	NV	NV	NV	NV	NV	NV	NV
Mississippi State	AP	RV	RV	RV	25	RV	25	RV	19	17	14	15	14	14	22	22	21	24	25	NV	NV	NV
Mississippi State	C	RV	RV	RV	RV	RV	RV	25	19	16	13	18	14	13	RV	RV	23	24	RV	RV	NV	NV
Missouri	AP	NV	NV	NV	NV	NV	RV	RV	RV	RV	RV	RV	22	20	15	21	15	14	15	21	23	RV
Missouri	C	NV	NV	NV	NV	NV	RV	RV	RV	RV	NV	RV	24	21	16	22	16	16	15	22	24	RV
Oklahoma	AP	NV	NV	NV	NV	21	13	14	12	12	17	RV	NV	RV	RV	NV	NV	NV	NV	NV	NV	NV
Oklahoma	C	NV	NV	NV	NV	21	17	15	11	10	16	RV	RV	NV	NV	NV	NV	NV	NV	NV	NV	NV
Ole Miss	AP	24	25	RV	23	23	19	17	16	24	23	21	16	23	25	19	24	RV	RV	RV	RV	18
Ole Miss	C	25	RV	RV	24	20	15	16	16	23	22	21	16	23	RV	23	RV	RV	RV	RV	RV	18
South Carolina	AP	NV	NV	NV	NV	NV	NV	NV	NV	NV	NV	NV	NV	NV	NV	NV	NV	NV	NV	NV	NV	NV
South Carolina	C	NV	NV	NV	NV	NV	NV	NV	NV	NV	NV	NV	NV	NV	NV	NV	NV	NV	NV	NV	NV	NV
Tennessee	AP	12	11	11	7	3	1	1	1	1	1	6	6	8	4	5	6	5	4	8	6	5
Tennessee	C	12	9	9	6	3	1	1	1	1	1	6	6	8	4	4	6	5	4	6т	6	5
Texas	AP	19	RV	RV	RV	RV	RV	RV	NV	NV	NV	NV	NV	RV	RV	NV	NV	NV	NV	NV	NV	NV
Texas	C	19	RV	RV	RV	RV	RV	NV	NV	NV	NV	NV	NV	NV	NV	NV	NV	NV	NV	NV	NV	NV
Texas A&M	AP	13	23	23	20	22	17	12	13	13	10	11	13	13	10	8	7	12	22	14	19	19
Texas A&M	C	15	23	22	20	24	18	11	13	12	9	11	13	15	13	9	7	11	21	16	18	19
Vanderbilt	AP	NV	NV	NV	RV	NV	NV	NV	NV	NV	RV	NV	RV	24	RV	NV	NV	RV	RV	NV	NV	NV
Vanderbilt	C	NV	NV	NV	NV	NV	NV	NV	NV	NV	RV	NV	RV	RV	NV	NV	NV	NV	RV	NV	RV	NV

== Postseason ==
=== SEC Tournament ===
The conference tournament was played from March 12−16, 2025 at Bridgestone Arena in Nashville, TN. Teams were seeded by conference record, with ties broken by record between the tied teams followed by record against the regular-season champion, if necessary.

* – denotes overtime

First round Wednesday, March 12; SEC Network
9	Arkansas	72
16	South Carolina	68
12	Vanderbilt	72
13	Texas	79
10	Mississippi State	91
15	LSU	62
11	Georgia	75
14	Oklahoma	81

Second round Thursday, March 13; SEC Network
8	Ole Miss	83
9	Arkansas	80
5	Texas A&M	89
13	Texas	94**
7	Missouri	85
10	Mississippi State	73
6	Kentucky	85
14	Oklahoma	84

Quarterfinals; Friday, March 14; ESPN/SEC Network
1	Auburn	62
8	Ole Miss	57
4	Tennessee	83
13	Texas	72
2	Florida	95
7	Missouri	81
3	Alabama	99
6	Kentucky	70

Semifinals; Saturday, March 15; ESPN
1	Auburn	65
4	Tennessee	70
2	Florida	104
3	Alabama	82

Championship; Sunday, March 16; ESPN
4	Tennessee	77
2	Florida	86

=== NCAA Tournament ===
Seed	Region	School	First Four	First round	Second round	Sweet 16	Elite Eight	Final Four	Championship
1	South	Auburn	Bye	W 83–63 vs. (16) Alabama State	W 82–70 vs. (9) Creighton	W 78–65 vs. (5) Michigan	W 70–64 vs. (2) Michigan State	L 73–79 vs. (W1) Florida	DNP
1	West	Florida	Bye	W 95–69 vs. (16) Norfolk State	W 77–75 vs. (8) UConn	W 87–71 vs. (4) Maryland	W 84–79 vs. (3) Texas Tech	W 79–73 vs. (S1) Auburn	W 65–63 vs. (MW1) Houston
2	East	Alabama	Bye	W 90–81 vs. (15) Robert Morris	W 80–66 vs. (7) Saint Mary's	W 113–88 vs. (6) BYU	L 65–85 vs. (1) Duke	DNP	
2	Midwest	Tennessee	Bye	W 77–62 vs. (15) Wofford	W 67–58 vs. (7) UCLA	W 78–65 vs. (3) Kentucky	L 50–69 vs. (1) Houston	DNP	
3	Midwest	Kentucky	Bye	W 76–57 vs. (14) Troy	W 84–75 vs. (6) Illinois	L 65–78 vs. (2) Tennessee	DNP		
4	South	Texas A&M	Bye	W 80–71 vs. (13) Yale	L 79–91 vs. (5) Michigan	DNP			
6	South	Ole Miss	Bye	W 71–64 vs. (11) North Carolina	W 91–78 vs. (3) Iowa State	L 70–73 vs. (2) Michigan State	DNP		
6	West	Missouri	Bye	L 57–67 vs. (11) Drake	DNP				
8	East	Mississippi State	Bye	L 72–75 vs. (9) Baylor	DNP				
9	Midwest	Georgia	Bye	L 68–89 vs. (8) Gonzaga	DNP				
9	West	Oklahoma	Bye	L 59–67 vs. (8) UConn	DNP				
10	East	Vanderbilt	Bye	L 56–59 vs. (7) Saint Mary's	DNP				
10	West	Arkansas	Bye	W 79–72 vs. (7) Kansas	W 75–66 vs. (2) St. John's	L 83–85^{OT} vs. (3) Texas Tech	DNP		
11	Midwest	Texas	L 80–86 vs. (11) Xavier	DNP					
	14 Bids	W–L (%):	0–1 (.000)	8–5 (.615)	7–1 (.875)	4–3 (.571)	2–2 (.500)	1–1 (.500)	1–0 (1.000)
TOTAL: 21–13 (.618)

=== NIT ===
The following teams from the conference that will be selected to participate:

Seed	Bracket	School	First Round	Second Round	Quarterfinals	Semifinals	Finals
			−	−	−	−	−
	Bid	W-L (%):	0–0 (–)	0–0 (–)	0–0 (–)	0–0 (–)	TOTAL: 0–0 (–)

LSU and South Carolina were invited to the NIT, but both schools declined the invite.

=== CBC ===
Seed	School	First round	Second round	Quarterfinals	Semifinals	Final
		−	−	−	−	−
	W-L (%):	0–0 (–)	0–0 (–)	0–0 (–)	0–0 (–)	TOTAL: 0–0 (–)

Index to colors and formatting
SEC member won
SEC member lost

== Head coaches ==
=== Coaching changes ===
Coach	School	Reason	Replacement
Eric Musselman	Arkansas	Accepted coaching position at USC	John Calipari
John Calipari	Kentucky	Accepted coaching position at Arkansas	Mark Pope

=== Coaches ===
Note: Stats shown are before the beginning of the season. SEC records are from time at current school.

Team	Head coach	Previous job	Seasons at school	Record at school	SEC record	SEC titles	NCAA tournaments	NCAA Final Fours	NCAA Championships
Alabama	Nate Oats	Buffalo	6th	117–54 (.684)	62–28 (.689)	2	4	1	0
Arkansas	John Calipari	Kentucky	1st	0–0 (–)	198–65 (.753)	6	23	6	1
Auburn	Bruce Pearl	Tennessee	11th	214–119 (.643)	162–114 (.587)	2	5	1	0
Florida	Todd Golden	San Francisco	3rd	40–29 (.580)	20–16 (.556)	0	1	0	0
Georgia	Mike White	Florida	3rd	36–33 (.522)	12–24 (.333)	0	0	0	0
Kentucky	Mark Pope	BYU	1st	0–0 (–)	0–0 (–)	0	2	0	0
LSU	Matt McMahon	Murray State	3rd	31–35 (.470)	11–25 (.306)	0	3	0	0
Oklahoma	Porter Moser	Loyola Chicago	4th	54–45 (.545)	0–0 (–)	0	2	1	0
Ole Miss	Chris Beard	Texas	2nd	20–12 (.625)	7–11 (.389)	0	5	1	0
Mississippi State	Chris Jans	New Mexico State	3rd	42–27 (.609)	8–10 (.444)	0	5	0	0
Missouri	Dennis Gates	Cleveland State	3rd	33–34 (.493)	11–25 (.306)	0	2	0	0
South Carolina	Lamont Paris	Chattanooga	3rd	37–29 (.561)	17–19 (.472)	0	2	0	0
Tennessee	Rick Barnes	Texas	10th	202–101 (.667)	100–60 (.625)	2	28	1	0
Texas	Rodney Terry	UTEP	3rd	43–21 (.672)	0–0 (–)	0	3	0	0
Texas A&M	Buzz Williams	Virginia Tech	6th	97–62 (.610)	45–37 (.549)	0	10	0	0
Vanderbilt	Mark Byington	James Madison	1st	0–0 (–)	0–0 (–)	0	1	0	0

Notes:

- SEC records, conference titles, etc. are from time at current school and are through the end the 2024–25 season.
- NCAA tournament appearances, NCAA Final Fours and Championship include time at other schools.

== Awards and honors ==
=== SEC Players of the Week ===
Throughout the regular season, the SEC offices will honor 2 players based on performance by naming them player of the week and freshman of the week.

Week	Player of the Week	School	Freshman of the Week	School	Ref.
November 11, 2024	Johni Broome	Auburn	Tre Johnson	Texas	
November 18, 2024	Andrew Carr	Kentucky	Asa Newell	Georgia	
November 25, 2024	Chaz Lanier	Tennessee	Labaron Philon Jr.	Alabama	
December 2, 2024	Johni Broome (2)	Auburn	Jeremiah Fears	Oklahoma	
December 9, 2024	Tamar Bates	Missouri	Asa Newell (2)	Georgia	
December 16, 2024	Johni Broome (3); Lamont Butler	Auburn; Kentucky	Boogie Fland	Arkansas	
December 23, 2024	Jordan Pope; Collin Murray-Boyles	Texas; South Carolina	Jeremiah Fears (2)	Oklahoma	
December 30, 2024	Zakai Zeigler	Tennessee	Labaron Philon Jr. (2)	Alabama	
January 6, 2025	Koby Brea; Chaz Lanier (2)	Kentucky; Tennessee	Labaron Philon Jr. (3)	Alabama	
January 13, 2025	Mark Sears; Alex Condon	Alabama; Florida	Asa Newell (3)	Georgia	
January 20, 2025	Caleb Grill	Missouri	Tahaad Pettiford	Auburn	
January 27, 2025	Johni Broome (4)	Auburn	Tre Johnson (2)	Texas	
February 3, 2025	Johni Broome (5)	Auburn	Tre Johnson (3)	Texas	
February 10, 2025	Alex Condon (2)	Florida	Asa Newell (4)	Georgia	
February 17, 2025	Denver Jones	Auburn	Tre Johnson (4)	Texas	
February 24, 2025	Mark Sears (2); Chaz Lanier (3)	Alabama; Tennessee	Jeremiah Fears (3)	Oklahoma	
March 3, 2025	Silas Demary Jr.	Georgia	Tre Johnson (5)	Texas	
March 10, 2025	Alex Condon (3)	Florida	N/A	N/A	

==== Totals per school ====
School	Total
Auburn	7
Texas	6
Alabama	5
Georgia	5
Tennessee	4
Kentucky	3
Oklahoma	3
Florida	3
Missouri	2
Arkansas	1
South Carolina	1
LSU	0
Ole Miss	0
Mississippi State	0
Texas A&M	0
Vanderbilt	0

=== All-Americans ===
Consensus All-Americans
First Team	Second Team
None	None

To earn "consensus" status, a player must win honors based on a point system computed from the four different all-America teams. The point system consists of three points for first team, two points for second team and one point for third team. No honorable mention or fourth team or lower are used in the computation. The top five totals plus ties are first team and the next five plus ties are second team.

Associated Press	NABC	Sporting News	USBWA
First Team
Second Team
Third Team

*Associated Press All-America Team
*National Association of Basketball Coaches All-America Team
*Sporting News All-America Team
*USBWA All-America Team

=== All-District ===
The United States Basketball Writers Association (USBWA) named the following from the SEC to their All-District Teams:

District IV

All-District Team

District IV

Player of the Year

All-District Team

The National Association of Basketball Coaches (NABC) named the following from the SEC to their All-District Teams:

District 20

=== SEC season awards ===
SEC individual awards
Award	Recipient(s)
Player of the Year	Johni Broome, Auburn
Coach of the Year	Bruce Pearl, Auburn
Defensive Player of the Year	Zakai Zeigler, Tennessee
Newcomer of the Year	Chaz Lanier, Tennessee
Freshman of the Year	Tre Johnson, Texas
Sixth Man Award	Caleb Grill, Missouri
Scholar-Athlete of the Year	Benjamin Bosmans-Verdonk, South Carolina

2024-25 SEC Men's Basketball All-Conference Teams
First Team	Second Team	Third Team	Defensive Team	Freshman Team
Johni Broome, Auburn; Walter Clayton Jr., Florida; Mark Sears, Alabama; Wade Taylor IV, Texas A&M; Zakai Zeigler, Tennessee	Josh Hubbard, Mississippi State; Tre Johnson, Texas; Chaz Lanier, Tennessee; Collin Murray-Boyles, South Carolina; Otega Oweh, Kentucky	Chad Baker-Mazara, Auburn; Alex Condon, Florida; Jason Edwards, Vanderbilt; Mark Mitchell, Missouri; Sean Pedulla, Ole Miss	Denver Jones, Auburn; Jahmai Mashack, Tennessee; Cameron Matthews, Mississippi State; Anthony Robinson II, Missouri; Zakai Zeigler, Tennessee	Jeremiah Fears, Oklahoma; Tre Johnson, Texas; Asa Newell, Georgia; Tahaad Pettiford, Auburn; Labaron Philon Jr., Alabama

==== Scholar Athlete of the year ====
Name	School	Pos.	Ht., Wt.	GPA	Major

=== SEC All-Tournament Team ===
Name	Pos.	Team
Johni Broome	Center	Auburn
Zakai Ziegler	Guard	Tennessee
Jordan Gainey	Guard	Tennessee
Walter Clayton Jr.	Guard	Florida
Will Richard	Guard	Florida

=== SEC Tournament Most Outstanding Player ===
Name	Pos.	Team
Walter Clayton Jr.	Guard	Florida

=== 2024–25 Season statistic leaders ===
Scoring leaders
Rk	Player	PTS	PPG
1	Tre Johnson	555	20.6
2	Mark Sears	555	19.1
3	Johni Broome	497	18.4
4	Josh Hubbard	533	18.4
5	Chaz Lanier	517	17.8

Rebound leaders
Rk	Player	REB	RPG
1	Johni Broome	292	10.8
2	Amari Williams	255	8.8
3	Collin Murray-Boyles	244	8.4
4	Devin McGlockton	232	8.0
4	Grant Nelson	232	8.0

Field goal leaders (avg 5 fga/gm)
Rk	Player	FG	FGA	PCT
1	Collin Murray-Broyles	184	310	.594
2	Asa Newell	170	309	.550
3	Adou Thiero	138	252	.548
4	Will Richard	145	285	.509
5	Johni Broome	193	382	.505

Assist leaders
Rk	Player	AST	APG
1	Zakai Zeigler	201	7.2
2	Boogie Fland	103	5.7
3	Mark Sears	144	5.0
4	A.J. Hoggard	129	4.6
5	Wade Taylor IV	115	4.6

Block leaders
Rk	Player	BLK	BPG
1	Johni Broome	66	2.4
2	Zvonimir Ivisic	59	2.1
3	Felix Okpara	52	1.8
4	Kadin Shedrick	49	1.7
5	Somto Cyril	47	1.6

Free throw leaders
Rk	Player	FT	FTA	PCT
1	Chad Baker-Mazara	103	115	.896
2	Tre Johnson	98	111	.883
3	Josh Hubbard	108	123	.878
4	Cam Carter	93	107	.869
5	Wade Taylor IV	97	112	.866

Steal leaders
Rk	Player	STL	SPG
1	Cameron Matthews	73	2.5
2	Anthony Robinson II	60	2.1
3	Zakai Zeigler	55	2.0
4	Sean Padulla	56	1.9
5	Zhuric Phelps	52	1.9

Three point leaders
Rk	Player	3P	3PA	%
1	Brycen Goodine	54	119	.454
2	Koby Brea	75	170	.441
3	Caleb Grill	68	158	.430
4	Aden Holloway	71	168	.423
5	Miles Kelly	69	168	.411

Thru March 3, 2025

== 2025 NBA draft ==
PG	Point guard	SG	Shooting guard	SF	Small forward	PF	Power forward	C	Center

Player	Team	Round	Pick #	Position	School	Nationality
Tre Johnson	Washington Wizards	1	6	SG	Texas	United States
Jeremiah Fears	New Orleans Pelicans	1	7	PG	Oklahoma	United States
Collin Murray-Boyles	Toronto Raptors	1	9	PF	South Carolina	United States
Walter Clayton Jr.	Washington Wizards	1	18	PG	Florida	United States
Asa Newell	New Orleans Pelicans	1	23	PF	Georgia	United States
Johni Broome	Philadelphia 76ers	2	35	PF	Auburn	United States
Adou Thiero	Brooklyn Nets	2	36	SF	Arkansas	United States
Chaz Lanier	Detroit Pistons	2	37	SG	Tennessee	United States
Alijah Martin	Toronto Raptors	2	39	SG	Florida	United States
Koby Brea	Golden State Warriors	2	41	SG	Kentucky	Dominican Republic
Amari Williams	Orlando Magic	2	46	C	Kentucky	United Kingdom
Will Richard	Memphis Grizzlies	2	56	PG	Florida	United States
Jahmai Mashack	Houston Rockets	2	59	SG	Tennessee	United States

== Home game attendance ==
Team	Stadium	Capacity	Game 1	Game 2	Game 3	Game 4	Game 5	Game 6	Game 7	Game 8	Game 9	Game 10	Game 11	Game 12	Game 13	Game 14	Game 15	Game 16	Game 17	Game 18	Game 19	Game 20	Total	Average	% of Capacity
Alabama	Coleman Coliseum	15,383	13,474†	13,474†	13,474†	13,474†	12,198	13,474†	13,474†	13,474†	13,474†	13,474†	13,474†	13,474†	13,474†	13,474†	13,474†						200,834	13,389	87.04%
Arkansas	Bud Walton Arena	19,368	19,200†	19,200†	19,200†	19,200†	19,200†	19,200†	19,200†	19,200†	19,200†	19,200†	19,200†	19,200†	19,200†	19,200†	19,200†	19,200†	19,200†				326,400	19,200	99.13%
Auburn	Neville Arena	9,121	9,121†	9,121†	9,121†	9,121†	9,121†	9,121†	9,121†	9,121†	9,121†	9,121†	9,121†	9,121†	9,121†	9,121†	9,121†						136,815	9,121	100.00%
Florida	O'Connell Center	11,255	8,381	7,857	8,005	9,553	9,184	10,109	10,676	11,011	10,491	11,107	11,187	9,745	10,853	10,513	10,784	11,191†					160,647	10,040	89.20%
Georgia	Stegeman Coliseum	10,523	6,193	5,405	5,757	5,775	6,285	8,045	6,349	8,368	10,140	10,523†	10,523†	10,523†	7,062	7,193	10,169	9,653	10,066	10,523†			148,552	8,253	78.43%
Kentucky	Rupp Arena	20,545	19,635	20,048	19,314	19,961	20,049	19,914	19,646	21,093	20,042	21,093	20,039	21,108	21,266	20,003	20,076	20,164	21,268	21,288†			366,007	20,334	98.97%
LSU	Pete Maravich Assembly Center	13,215	8,043	7,247	6,442	8,042	8,323	7,156	6,599	8,278	8,257	8,479	8,675	10,098†	8,395	6,980	7,403	8,569	8,522	6,766			142,274	7,904	59.81%
Missouri	Mizzou Arena	15,061	11,044	8,912	8,889	9,564	8,496	9,298	9,791	15,061†	8,969	8,515	9,981	10,367	15,061†	15,061†	15,061†	15,061†	12,403	15,061†	12,595	15,061†	234,252	12,329	81.86%
Mississippi State	Humphrey Coliseum	9,100	9,125	8,726	8,744	9,492	7,111	6,567	8,075	9,551	9,448	9,283	9,584†	9,401	9,313	9,357	9,290						133,067	8,871	97.48%
Oklahoma Sooners	Lloyd Noble Center	10,967	4,886	4,742	4,922	4,678	7,725	1,611	6,244	6,876	7,604	10,436†	7,264	8,336	10,162	7,961	7,140	10,162	7,317				118,066	6,945	63.33%
Ole Miss	SJB Pavilion	9,500	7,982	7,314	4,033	6,873	7,106	6,796	7,841	8,746	9,406	10,008†	8,480	9,974	9,128	9,759	8,007	9,038					130,491	8,156	85.85%
South Carolina	Colonial Life Arena	18,000	12,388	12,205	11,577	11,054	10,997	11,092	12,780	10,831	10,525	11,115	13,390	14,930†	13,203	12,856	10,974	11,369	11,754	11,633			214,673	11,926	66.26%
Tennessee	Thompson–Boling Arena	21,678	17,813	16,916	17,232	17,314	21,678	16,866	20,706	19,616	21,678	19,239	21,678	22,272	21,678	20,002	21,678	22,392†	21,678				340,436	20,026	92.38%
Texas	Moody Center	10,763	10,993	10,662	10,457	10,716	11,039	10,600	10,514	10,565	10,565	10,516	10,195	11,267	11,313†	10,799	11,091	11,060	10,765	11,121			194,238	10,791	100.26%
Texas A&M	Reed Arena	12,989	8,673	7,195	11,658	7,061	8,833	5,023	11,086	12,236	12,997†	12,812	9,379	9,283	10,752	12,989	9,287	12,257					161,521	10,095	77.72%
Vanderbilt	Memorial Gymnasium	14,316	5,011	5,700	5,945	5,249	6,068	6,317	7,230	7,302	8,688	6,443	14,316†	14,316†	9,215	13,032	10,494	10,311	8,829				144,466	8,498	59.36%
Total		13,823																					3,152,739	11,617	84.04%

old – At or exceed capacity
†Season high
