= 2024–25 Mississippi State Bulldogs men's basketball team =

American college basketball season

2024–25 Mississippi State Bulldogs men's basketball
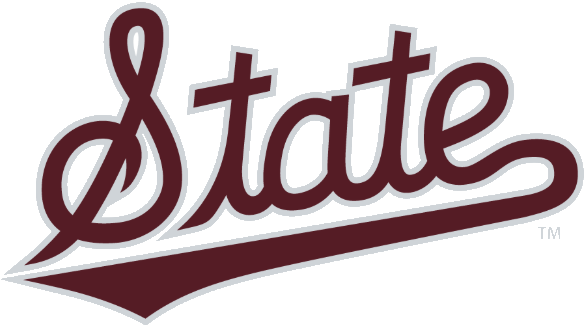

NCAA tournament, First Round
- Conference: Southeastern Conference
- Record: 21–13 (8–10 SEC)
- Head coach: Chris Jans (3rd season)
- Assistant coaches: George Brooks; David Anwar; Patrice Days; Scott Padgett; Dillon Elder
- Home arena: Humphrey Coliseum

2024–25 Southeastern Conference men's basketball standings
	Conf.				Overall
Team	W		L	PCT	W		L	PCT
No. 4 Auburn	15	–	3	.833	32	–	6	.842
No. 1 Florida †	14	–	4	.778	36	–	4	.900
No. 6 Alabama	13	–	5	.722	28	–	9	.757
No. 5 Tennessee	12	–	6	.667	30	–	8	.789
No. 19 Texas A&M	11	–	7	.611	23	–	11	.676
No. 12 Kentucky	10	–	8	.556	24	–	12	.667
Missouri	10	–	8	.556	22	–	12	.647
No. 18 Ole Miss	10	–	8	.556	24	–	12	.667
No. 20 Arkansas	8	–	10	.444	22	–	14	.611
Mississippi State	8	–	10	.444	21	–	13	.618
Georgia	8	–	10	.444	20	–	13	.606
Vanderbilt	8	–	10	.444	20	–	13	.606
Texas	6	–	12	.333	19	–	16	.543
Oklahoma	6	–	12	.333	20	–	14	.588
LSU	3	–	15	.167	14	–	18	.438
South Carolina	2	–	16	.111	12	–	20	.375
† 2025 SEC tournament winner Rankings from AP poll

The 2024–25 Mississippi State Bulldogs men's basketball team represented Mississippi State University during the 2024–25 NCAA Division I men's basketball season. The Bulldogs, led by third-year head coach Chris Jans, played their home games at Humphrey Coliseum located near Starkville, Mississippi as a member of the Southeastern Conference.

== Previous season ==
The Bulldogs finished the 2023–24 season 21–14, 8–10 in SEC play to finish in 9th place. They defeated LSU in the second round, and Tennessee in the quarterfinals of the SEC tournament before losing to Auburn in the semifinals. They received an at-large bid to the NCAA Tournament as the 8th seed in the west, where they lost in the first round to Michigan State.

== Offseason ==
=== Departures ===
Departures
Name	Number	Pos.	Height	Weight	Year	Hometown	Reason for departure
D.J. Jeffries	0	F	6'7"	215	Graduate student	Olive Branch, Mississippi	Exhausted eligibility
Tolu Smith III	1	F	6'11"	245	Graduate student	Bay St. Louis, Mississippi	Graduated; joined the Motor City Cruise
Shakeel Moore	3	G	6'1"	190	Senior	Greensboro, North Carolina	Transferred to Kansas
Dashawn Davis	10	G	6'2"	190	Graduate student	Bronx, New York	Exhausted eligibility
Trey Fort	11	G	6'4"	200	Junior	Jackson, Mississippi	Transferred to Samford
Jimmy Bell Jr.	15	F	6'10"	280	Graduate student	Saginaw, Michigan	Exhausted eligibility
Jaquan Scott	22	F	6'8"	230	Junior	Dallas, Texas	Transferred to UTSA
Isaac Stansbury	25	G	6'1"	170	Graduate student	Bowling Green, Kentucky	Exhausted eligibility

=== Incoming transfers ===
Incoming transfers
Name	Number	Pos.	Height	Weight	Year	Hometown	Previous school
Claudell Harris Jr.	0	G	6'4"	200	Senior	Hahnville, Louisiana	Boston College
Kanye Clary	1	G	5'11"	190	Junior	Virginia Beach, Virginia	Penn State
Riley Kugel	2	G	6'5"	210	Junior	Orlando, Florida	Florida
Jeremy Foumena	7	C	6'11"	250	RS Sophomore	Montreal, Quebec	Rhode Island
RJ Meléndez	22	F	6'7"	210	Senior	Arecibo, Puerto Rico	Georgia
Michael Nwoko	23	C	6'10"	245	Sophomore	Toronto, Ontario	Miami (FL)

=== Recruiting class ===
College recruiting information
Name	Hometown	School	Height	Weight	Commit date
Dellquan Warren; G	Erie, Pennsylvania	Our Saviour Lutheran School	6 ft 2 in (1.88 m)	180 lb (82 kg)	Sep 10, 2023
Dellquan Warren; G	Recruit ratings: Rivals: 247Sports: ESPN: (84)				
EJ Paymon; F	Raymond, Mississippi	Raymond High School	6 ft 9 in (2.06 m)	230 lb (100 kg)	Feb 21, 2024
EJ Paymon; F	Recruit ratings: Rivals: 247Sports: ESPN: (80)				
Overall recruit ranking:
Note: In many cases, Scout, Rivals, 247Sports, On3, and ESPN may conflict in their listings of height and weight.; In these cases, the average was taken. ESPN grades are on a 100-point scale.; Sources: "2024 Team Ranking". Rivals.

== Preseason ==
On October 14, 2024 the SEC released their preseason media poll. Mississippi State was picked to finish tenth in the SEC regular season. Sophomore guard Josh Hubbard was named to the Second Team All-SEC.

=== SEC media poll ===
SEC media poll
Predicted finish	Team
1	Alabama
2	Auburn
3	Tennessee
4	Arkansas
5	Texas A&M
6	Florida
7	Texas
8	Kentucky
9	Ole Miss
10	Mississippi State
11	South Carolina
12	Georgia
13	Missouri
14	LSU
15	Oklahoma
16	Vanderbilt

== Roster ==
2024–25 Mississippi State Bulldogs men's basketball team
Players
Coaches

Pos.	#	Name	Height	Weight	Year	Previous school	Hometown
G	0	Claudell Harris Jr.	6 ft 4 in (1.93 m)	200 lb (91 kg)	Sr	Boston College	Hahnville, Louisiana
G	1	Kanye Clary	5 ft 11 in (1.8 m)	190 lb (86 kg)	Jr	Penn State	Virginia Beach, Virginia
G	2	Riley Kugel	6 ft 5 in (1.96 m)	210 lb (95 kg)	Jr	Florida	Orlando, Florida
F	3	KeShawn Murphy	6 ft 10 in (2.08 m)	230 lb (104 kg)	RS Jr	Ramsay High School	Birmingham, Alabama
F	4	Cameron Matthews	6 ft 7 in (2.01 m)	235 lb (107 kg)	GS	Olive Branch High School	Olive Branch, Mississippi
G	5	Shawn Jones Jr.	6 ft 5 in (1.96 m)	205 lb (93 kg)	Jr	Shadow Creek High School	Houston, Texas
G	6	Dellquan Warren	6 ft 2 in (1.88 m)	180 lb (82 kg)	Fr	Our Saviour Lutheran School	Erie, Pennsylvania
C	7	Jeremy Foumena	6 ft 11 in (2.11 m)	250 lb (113 kg)	RS So	Rhode Island	Montreal, Quebec
G	8	Harrison Alexander	6 ft 5 in (1.96 m)	190 lb (86 kg)	RS Fr	Madison-Ridgeland Academy	Madison, Mississippi
F	9	Adrian Myers	6 ft 6 in (1.98 m)	210 lb (95 kg)	So	Massanutten Military Academy	Stephens City, Virginia
F	11	EJ Paymon	6 ft 9 in (2.06 m)	230 lb (104 kg)	Fr	Raymond High School	Raymond, Mississippi
G	12	Josh Hubbard	5 ft 11 in (1.8 m)	190 lb (86 kg)	So	Madison-Ridgeland Academy	Madison, Mississippi
G	21	Martavious Russell	6 ft 3 in (1.91 m)	190 lb (86 kg)	RS So	Sipsey Valley High School	Coker, Alabama
F	22	RJ Meléndez	6 ft 7 in (2.01 m)	210 lb (95 kg)	Sr	Georgia	Arecibo, Puerto Rico
C	23	Michael Nwoko	6 ft 10 in (2.08 m)	245 lb (111 kg)	So	Miami (FL)	Toronto, Ontario
C	34	Gai Chol	7 ft 0 in (2.13 m)	245 lb (111 kg)	So	Greenforest McCalep Christian Academy	Juba, South Sudan
G	40	Trey Jackson III	6 ft 2 in (1.88 m)	200 lb (91 kg)	RS Sr	MUW	Starkville, Mississippi

Head coach

- Chris Jans (Loras)

Assistant coach(es)

- George Brooks (Mississippi State)
- David Anwar (Fitchburg State)
- Patrice Days (New Orleans)
- Scott Padgett (Kentucky)
- Dillon Elder (Texas A&M)

Legend

- (C) Team captain
- (S) Suspended
- (I) Ineligible
- (W) Walk-on
- Injured
- Current redshirt

Roster
Last update: December 5, 2024

== Schedule and results ==
Date time, TV	Rank^{#}	Opponent^{#}	Result	Record	High points	High rebounds	High assists	Site (attendance) city, state
Non-conference regular season
November 4, 2024*; 6:30 p.m., SECN+/ESPN+		West Georgia	W 95–60	1–0	26 – Hubbard	7 – Murphy	4 – Murphy	Humphrey Coliseum (9,125); Starkville, MS
November 8, 2024*; 6:30 p.m., SECN+/ESPN+		Georgia State	W 101–66	2–0	15 – Hubbard	6 – Tied	6 – Tied	Humphrey Coliseum (8,726); Starkville, MS
November 12, 2024*; 6:30 p.m., SECN+/ESPN+		Southeastern Louisiana	W 80–59	3–0	23 – Hubbard	13 – Matthews	5 – Hubbard	Humphrey Coliseum (8,744); Starkville, MS
November 17, 2024*; 3:00 p.m., ESPN2		vs. Utah; Mid-South Showdown	W 78–73	4–0	23 – Hubbard	14 – Murphy	4 – Matthews	Landers Center (2,596); Southaven, MS
November 22, 2024*; 7:30 p.m., ACCNX/ESPN+		at SMU	W 84–79	5–0	16 – Murphy	7 – Murphy	8 – Matthews	Moody Coliseum (5,468); University Park, TX
November 28, 2024*; 8:30 p.m., CBSSN	No. 25	vs. UNLV; Arizona Tip-Off Cactus Division semifinals	W 80–58	6–0	14 – Murphy	13 – Murphy	4 – Tied	Mullett Arena (1,736); Tempe, AZ
November 29, 2024*; 8:30 p.m., CBSSN	No. 25	vs. Butler; Arizona Tip-Off Cactus Division championships	L 77–87	6–1	22 – Tied	12 – Murphy	3 – Hubbard	Mullett Arena (1,978); Tempe, AZ
December 4, 2024*; 8:15 p.m., SECN		No. 18 Pittsburgh; ACC–SEC Challenge	W 90–57	7–1	20 – Murphy	13 – Matthews	4 – Hubbard	Humphrey Coliseum (9,492); Starkville, MS
December 8, 2024*; 3:00 p.m., SECN+/ESPN+		Prairie View A&M	W 91–84	8–1	25 – Hubbard	10 – Nwoko	6 – Matthews	Humphrey Coliseum (7,111); Starkville, MS
December 14, 2024*; 5:00 p.m., ESPNU	No. 25	vs. McNeese; Magnolia Madness	W 66–63	9–1	18 – Meléndez	7 – Matthews	5 – Hubbard	Cadence Bank Arena (3,846); Tupelo, MS
December 17, 2024*; 6:30 p.m., SECN+/ESPN+		vs. Central Michigan; Magnolia Madness	W 83–59	10–1	19 – Harris Jr.	10 – Matthews	7 – Matthews	Mississippi Coliseum (2,536); Jackson, MS
December 21, 2024*; 11:30 a.m., CBS		at No. 21 Memphis	W 79–66	11–1	19 – Kugel	9 – Tied	6 – Matthews	FedExForum (14,565); Memphis, TN
December 30, 2024*; 8:00 p.m., SECN	No. 17	Bethune–Cookman	W 87–73	12–1	22 – Kugel	9 – Murphy	5 – Matthews	Humphrey Coliseum (6,567); Starkville, MS
SEC regular season
January 4, 2025; 1:00 p.m., SECN	No. 17	South Carolina	W 85–50	13–1 (1–0)	21 – Hubbard	9 – Harris Jr.	5 – Matthews	Humphrey Coliseum (8,075); Starkville, MS
January 7, 2025; 8:00 p.m., ESPNU	No. 14	at Vanderbilt	W 76–64	14–1 (2–0)	19 – Meléndez	7 – Tied	5 – Hubbard	Memorial Gymnasium (8,688); Nashville, TN
January 11, 2025; 7:30 p.m., SECN	No. 14	No. 6 Kentucky	L 90–95	14–2 (2–1)	19 – Matthews	10 – Matthews	5 – Jones Jr.	Humphrey Coliseum (9,551); Starkville, MS
January 14, 2025; 6:00 p.m., SECN	No. 15	at No. 2 Auburn	L 66–88	14–3 (2–2)	17 – Hubbard	10 – Meléndez	2 – Matthews	Neville Arena (9,121); Auburn, AL
January 18, 2025; 5:00 p.m., ESPN2	No. 15	No. 21 Ole Miss	W 84–81 ^{OT}	15–3 (3–2)	21 – Kugel	11 – Tied	3 – Tied	Humphrey Coliseum (9,448); Starkville, MS
January 21, 2025; 6:00 p.m., ESPN2	No. 14	at No. 6 Tennessee	L 56–68	15–4 (3–3)	14 – Hubbard	8 – Matthews	2 – Tied	Thompson–Boling Arena (21,678); Knoxville, TN
January 25, 2025; 12:00 p.m., SECN	No. 14	at South Carolina	W 65–60 ^{OT}	16–4 (4–3)	15 – Kugel	7 – Tied	5 – Tied	Colonial Life Arena (13,203); Columbia, SC
January 29, 2025; 8:00 p.m., SECN	No. 14	No. 4 Alabama	L 84–88	16–5 (4–4)	38 – Hubbard	6 – Tied	4 – Matthews	Humphrey Coliseum (9,283); Starkville, MS
February 1, 2025; 12:00 p.m., SECN	No. 14	No. 20 Missouri	L 61–88	16–6 (4–5)	24 – Hubbard	9 – Murphy	5 – Matthews	Humphrey Coliseum (9,584); Starkville, MS
February 8, 2025; 5:00 p.m., SECN	No. 22	at Georgia	W 76–75	17–6 (5–5)	16 – Hubbard	8 – Murphy	6 – Tied	Stegeman Coliseum (10,169); Athens, GA
February 11, 2025; 6:00 p.m., ESPN2	No. 22	No. 3т Florida	L 68–81	17–7 (5–6)	19 – Hubbard	13 – Murphy	6 – Hubbard	Humphrey Coliseum (9,401); Starkville, MS
February 15, 2025; 5:00 p.m., ESPN2	No. 22	at No. 19 Ole Miss	W 81–71	18–7 (6–6)	17 – Melendez	8 – Tied	4 – Tied	SJB Pavilion (9,759); Oxford, MS
February 18, 2025; 6:00 p.m., SECN	No. 21	No. 7 Texas A&M	W 70–54	19–7 (7–6)	25 – Hubbard	8 – Murphy	4 – Hubbard	Humphrey Coliseum (9,313); Starkville, MS
February 22, 2025; 12:00 p.m., SECN	No. 21	at Oklahoma	L 87–93	19–8 (7–7)	19 – Hubbard	10 – Melendez	5 – Hubbard	Lloyd Noble Center (7,140); Norman, OK
February 25, 2025; 8:00 p.m., ESPN2	No. 24	at No. 6 Alabama	L 73–111	19–9 (7–8)	21 – Hubbard	11 – Murphy	4 – Hubbard	Coleman Coliseum (13,474); Tuscaloosa, AL
March 1, 2025; 2:30 p.m., SECN	No. 24	LSU	W 81–69	20–9 (8–8)	30 – Hubbard	7 – Matthews	3 – Matthews	Humphrey Coliseum (9,357); Starkville, MS
March 4, 2025; 7:00 p.m., SECN	No. 25	Texas	L 82–87 ^{OT}	20–10 (8–9)	16 – Hubbard	8 – Melendez	4 – Kugel	Humphrey Coliseum (9,290); Starkville, MS
March 8, 2025; 11:00 a.m., SECN	No. 25	at Arkansas	L 92–93	20–11 (8–10)	17 – Hubbard	6 – Tied	4 – Tied	Bud Walton Arena (19,200); Fayetteville, AR
SEC Tournament
March 12, 2025; 6:00 p.m., SECN	(10)	vs. (15) LSU; First Round	W 91–62	21–11	26 – Hubbard	6 – Tied	4 – Warren	Bridgestone Arena (13,912); Nashville, TN
March 13, 2025; 6:00 p.m., SECN	(10)	vs. (7) No. 21 Missouri; Second Round	L 73–85	21–12	24 – Hubbard	8 – Murphy	4 – Kugel	Bridgestone Arena (16,347); Nashville, TN
NCAA Tournament
March 21, 2025*; 11:15 a.m., CBS	(8 E)	vs. (9 E) Baylor; First Round	L 72–75	21–13	26 – Hubbard	9 – Matthews	2 – Matthews	Lenovo Center (19,180); Raleigh, NC
*Non-conference game. ^{#}Rankings from AP Poll. (#) Tournament seedings in parentheses. E=East. All times are in Central Time.

== Rankings ==
Ranking movements Legend: ██ Increase in ranking ██ Decrease in ranking — = Not ranked RV = Received votes
	Week																				
Poll	Pre	1	2	3	4	5	6	7	8	9	10	11	12	13	14	15	16	17	18	19	Final
AP	RV	RV	RV	25	RV	25	RV	19	17	14	15	14	14	22	22	21	24	25	—	—	—
Coaches	RV	RV	RV	RV	RV	RV	25	19	16	13	18	14	13	RV	RV	23	24	RV	RV	—	—
