= 2024–25 Arkansas Razorbacks men's basketball team =

American college basketball season

2024–25 Arkansas Razorbacks men's basketball

NCAA tournament, Sweet Sixteen
- Conference: Southeastern Conference

Ranking
- Coaches: No. 25
- AP: No. 20
- Record: 22–14 (8–10 SEC)
- Head coach: John Calipari (1st season)
- Associate head coach: Ronald Coleman (1st season); Kenny Payne (1st season)
- Assistant coaches: Chuck Martin (1st season); Brad Calipari (1st season)
- Home arena: Bud Walton Arena (Capacity: 19,368)

2024–25 Southeastern Conference men's basketball standings
	Conf.				Overall
Team	W		L	PCT	W		L	PCT
No. 4 Auburn	15	–	3	.833	32	–	6	.842
No. 1 Florida †	14	–	4	.778	36	–	4	.900
No. 6 Alabama	13	–	5	.722	28	–	9	.757
No. 5 Tennessee	12	–	6	.667	30	–	8	.789
No. 19 Texas A&M	11	–	7	.611	23	–	11	.676
No. 12 Kentucky	10	–	8	.556	24	–	12	.667
Missouri	10	–	8	.556	22	–	12	.647
No. 18 Ole Miss	10	–	8	.556	24	–	12	.667
No. 20 Arkansas	8	–	10	.444	22	–	14	.611
Mississippi State	8	–	10	.444	21	–	13	.618
Georgia	8	–	10	.444	20	–	13	.606
Vanderbilt	8	–	10	.444	20	–	13	.606
Texas	6	–	12	.333	19	–	16	.543
Oklahoma	6	–	12	.333	20	–	14	.588
LSU	3	–	15	.167	14	–	18	.438
South Carolina	2	–	16	.111	12	–	20	.375
† 2025 SEC tournament winner Rankings from AP poll

The 2024–25 Arkansas Razorbacks men's basketball team represented the University of Arkansas during the 2024–25 NCAA Division I men's basketball season. The team was led by first year head coach John Calipari, who accepted the job after he resigned from his position at Kentucky after 15 years. Arkansas played its home games at Bud Walton Arena in Fayetteville, Arkansas as a member of the Southeastern Conference.

The Arkansas Razorbacks drew an average home attendance of 18,996, the 4th-highest of all college basketball teams.

== Previous season ==
Arkansas finished the season 16–17, 6–12 in SEC play to finish in a tie for 11th place. As the No. 12 seed in the SEC tournament, they defeated Vanderbilt before losing to South Carolina in the second round. This was Arkansas' first losing season since 2009–10.

Following the completion of the season, head coach Eric Musselman took the vacant USC Trojans job, which Andy Enfield had left to become the head coach of the SMU Mustangs. On April 10, former Kentucky coach John Calipari was hired to be Arkansas' head coach.

== Offseason ==
=== Departures ===
Nearly all of Arkansas' 2023-24 roster either entered the transfer portal or graduated after the season was over and Musselman departed for USC. Trevon Brazile elected to return to the team after testing his NBA draft status.

Name	Number	Pos.	Height	Weight	Year	Hometown	Reason for departure
Davonte Davis	4	G	6'4"	185	Senior	Jacksonville, AR	Transferred to Oklahoma State
Layden Blocker	6	G	6'2"	175	Freshman	Little Rock, AR	Transferred to DePaul
Denijay Harris	7	F	6'7"	200	Senior	Columbus, MS	Transferred to Southern Miss
Khalif Battle	0	G	6'5"	185	Senior	Hillside, NJ	Transferred to Gonzaga
Baye Fall	10	F	6'11"	200	Freshman	Dakar, Senegal	Transferred to Kansas State
Tramon Mark	12	G	6'6"	185	Junior	Dickinson, TX	Transferred to Texas
Joseph Pinion	5	G	6'5"	195	Sophomore	Morrilton, AR	Transferred to Arkansas State
Keyon Menifield	1	G	6'1"	150	Sophomore	Flint, MI	Quit basketball to be a rapper
El Ellis	3	G	6'3"	180	Grad	Durham, NC	Graduated
Chandler Lawson	8	F	6'8"	210	Grad	Memphis, TN	Graduated
Jalen Graham	11	F	6'10"	220	Grad	Phoenix, AZ	Graduated
Makhi Mitchell	15	F	6'10"	240	Grad	Washington, DC	Graduated
Jeremiah Davenport	24	G	6'6"	215	Grad	Cincinnati, OH	Graduated

=== Incoming transfers ===
Arkansas signed the #1 ranked transfer class in the nation for 2024.

Name	Number	Pos.	Height	Weight	Year	Hometown	Previous School
D. J. Wagner	21	G	6'4"	190	Sophomore	Camden, NJ	Transfer from Kentucky
Adou Thiero	3	F	6'8"	220	Junior	Pittsburgh, PA	Transfer from Kentucky
Zvonimir Ivišić	44	C	7'2"	235	Sophomore	Vodice, Croatia	Transfer from Kentucky
Johnell Davis	1	G	6'4"	205	Senior	Gary, IN	Transfer from Florida Atlantic
Jonas Aidoo	0	F	6'11"	245	Senior	Durham, NC	Transfer from Tennessee
Melo Sanchez	11	G	6'4"	185	Sophomore	San Diego, CA	Transfer from Hawaii Pacific

=== Recruiting class ===
==== 2024 recruiting class ====
Arkansas signed six high school athletes for the 2024 class, three of whom signed in the late signing period in April 2024, while the other three signed over the summer. The three April signees had originally signed with Kentucky while John Calipari was still head coach there, but followed Calipari to Arkansas.

College recruiting information
Name	Hometown	School	Height	Weight	Commit date
Boogie Fland; CG	Bronx, NY	Archbishop Stepinac	6 ft 2 in (1.88 m)	175 lb (79 kg)	Apr 1, 2024
Boogie Fland; CG	Recruit ratings: Rivals: 247Sports: On3: ESPN: (91)				
Karter Knox; SF	Riverview, FL	Overtime Elite	6 ft 6 in (1.98 m)	220 lb (100 kg)	Apr 1, 2024
Karter Knox; SF	Recruit ratings: Rivals: 247Sports: On3: ESPN: (89)				
Billy Richmond; SF	Memphis, TN	Camden (NJ)	6 ft 6 in (1.98 m)	200 lb (91 kg)	Apr 1, 2024
Billy Richmond; SF	Recruit ratings: Rivals: 247Sports: On3: ESPN: (88)				
Jaden Karuletwa; SG	Sun Valley, CA	Village Christian (CA)	6 ft 6 in (1.98 m)	180 lb (82 kg)	Jun 25, 2024
Jaden Karuletwa; SG	Recruit ratings: No ratings found				
Ayden Kelley; CG	Southaven, MS	Northpoint Christian (MS)	6 ft 1 in (1.85 m)	170 lb (77 kg)	Jul 4, 2024
Ayden Kelley; CG	Recruit ratings: No ratings found				
Casmir Chavis; CG	Minneapolis, MN	Park Center (MN)	6 ft 3 in (1.91 m)	180 lb (82 kg)	Jul 10, 2024
Casmir Chavis; CG	Recruit ratings: 247Sports:				
Overall recruit ranking: Rivals: 5 247Sports: 4 On3: 2
Note: In many cases, Scout, Rivals, 247Sports, On3, and ESPN may conflict in their listings of height and weight.; In these cases, the average was taken. ESPN grades are on a 100-point scale.; Sources: "Arkansas 2024 Basketball Commitments". Rivals.; "2024 Team Ranking". Rivals.

==== 2025 recruiting class ====
Arkansas signed three high school players to its 2025 class, to include two McDonald's All-Americans (Acuff, Thomas) and the top player in the state of Arkansas (Sealy). Arkansas also signed a top international player (Rtail) who has played professionally in Europe. This class is ranked the #4 class in the country according to On3.com, ESPN, and 247Sports, and the #5 class by Rivals.

College recruiting information
Name	Hometown	School	Height	Weight	Commit date
Darius Acuff; PG	Detroit, MI	IMG Academy	6 ft 2 in (1.88 m)	175 lb (79 kg)	Jul 26, 2024
Darius Acuff; PG	Recruit ratings: Rivals: 247Sports: On3: ESPN: (95)				
Meleek Thomas; CG	Pittsburgh, PA	Overtime Elite	6 ft 4 in (1.93 m)	175 lb (79 kg)	Nov 12, 2024
Meleek Thomas; CG	Recruit ratings: Rivals: 247Sports: On3: ESPN: (94)				
Isaiah Sealy; SF	Springdale, AR	Springdale	6 ft 7 in (2.01 m)	195 lb (88 kg)	Apr 1, 2024
Isaiah Sealy; SF	Recruit ratings: Rivals: 247Sports: On3: ESPN: (83)				
Karim Rtail; SF	Beirut, Lebanon		6 ft 9 in (2.06 m)	210 lb (95 kg)	Mar 19, 2025
Karim Rtail; SF	Recruit ratings: No ratings found				
Overall recruit ranking: Rivals: 5 247Sports: 4 On3: 4 ESPN: 4
Note: In many cases, Scout, Rivals, 247Sports, On3, and ESPN may conflict in their listings of height and weight.; In these cases, the average was taken. ESPN grades are on a 100-point scale.; Sources: "Arkansas 2025 Basketball Commitments". Rivals.; "2025 Team Ranking". Rivals.

== Roster ==
2024–25 Arkansas Razorbacks men's basketball team
Players
Coaches

Pos.	#	Name	Height	Weight	Year	Previous school	Hometown
G	0	Jaden Karuletwa	6 ft 5 in (1.96 m)	185 lb (84 kg)	Fr	Village Christian School	Sun Valley, California
G	1	Johnell Davis	6 ft 4 in (1.93 m)	210 lb (95 kg)	GS	Florida Atlantic	Gary, Indiana
G	2	Boogie Fland	6 ft 2 in (1.88 m)	175 lb (79 kg)	Fr	Archbishop Stepinac High School	Bronx, New York
F	3	Adou Thiero	6 ft 8 in (2.03 m)	220 lb (100 kg)	Jr	Kentucky	Pittsburgh, Pennsylvania
F	4	Trevon Brazile	6 ft 10 in (2.08 m)	230 lb (104 kg)	Jr	Missouri	Springfield, Missouri
G	5	Casmir Chavis	6 ft 0 in (1.83 m)	180 lb (82 kg)	Fr	Park Center Senior High School	Minneapolis, Minnesota
G	8	Melo Sanchez	6 ft 4 in (1.93 m)	185 lb (84 kg)	Jr	Hawaii Pacific	San Diego, California
F	9	Jonas Aidoo	6 ft 11 in (2.11 m)	240 lb (109 kg)	GS	Tennessee	Durham, North Carolina
F	11	Karter Knox	6 ft 6 in (1.98 m)	220 lb (100 kg)	Fr	Overtime Elite	Tampa, Florida
G	14	Ayden Kelley	5 ft 10 in (1.78 m)	170 lb (77 kg)	Fr	Northpoint Christian School	Memphis, Tennessee
G	21	D. J. Wagner	6 ft 4 in (1.93 m)	195 lb (88 kg)	So	Kentucky	Camden, New Jersey
F	24	Billy Richmond III	6 ft 5 in (1.96 m)	205 lb (93 kg)	Fr	Camden High School	Memphis, Tennessee
G	25	Kareem Watkins	5 ft 8 in (1.73 m)	175 lb (79 kg)	GS	Kentucky	Camden, New Jersey
F	44	Zvonimir Ivišić	7 ft 2 in (2.18 m)	245 lb (111 kg)	So	Kentucky	Vodice, Croatia
F	45	Lawson Blake (W)	6 ft 10 in (2.08 m)	240 lb (109 kg)	Sr	Link Year Prep	Fayetteville, Arkansas

Head coach

- John Calipari (Clarion)

Assistant coach(es)

- Kenny Payne (Louisville)
- Ronald Coleman (Lamar)
- Chuck Martin (Monmouth)
- Brad Calipari (Kentucky)

Legend

- (C) Team captain
- (S) Suspended
- (I) Ineligible
- (W) Walk-on
- Injured
- Current redshirt

Roster
Last update: December 6, 2024

== Schedule and results ==
Date time, TV	Rank^{#}	Opponent^{#}	Result	Record	High points	High rebounds	High assists	Site (attendance) city, state
Exhibition
October 25, 2024*; 8:00 pm, SECN	No. 16	No. 1 Kansas	W 85–69	–	22 – Fland	6 – Ivišić	5 – Fland	Bud Walton Arena (19,200); Fayetteville, AR
November 1, 2024*; 7:00 p.m.	No. 16	vs. TCU	L 65–66	–	20 – Thiero	9 – Brazile	5 – Fland	Dickies Arena (4,407); Fort Worth, TX
Non-conference regular season
November 6, 2024*; 7:00 p.m., SECN+/ESPN+	No. 16	Lipscomb	W 76–60	1–0	17 – Fland	6 – Davis	3 – Bland	Bud Walton Arena (19,200); Fayetteville, AR
November 9, 2024*; 6:30 p.m., ESPNU	No. 16	vs. No. 8 Baylor	L 67–72	1–1	24 – Thiero	6 – Thiero	7 – Fland	American Airlines Center (10,207); Dallas, TX
November 13, 2024*; 7:00 p.m., SECN+/ESPN+	No. 18	Troy	W 65–49	2–1	19 – Thiero	7 – Thiero	7 – Fland	Bud Walton Arena (19,200); Fayetteville, AR
November 18, 2024*; 7:00 p.m., SECN+/ESPN+	No. 20	Pacific	W 91–72	3–1	23 – Thiero	6 – Tied	5 – Wagner	Bud Walton Arena (19,200); Fayetteville, AR
November 22, 2024*; 8:00 p.m., SECN	No. 20	Little Rock; Turkey Throwdown	W 79–67	4–1	23 – Thiero	8 – Thiero	7 – Fland	Bud Walton Arena (19,200); Fayetteville, AR
November 25, 2024*; 7:00 p.m., SECN+/ESPN+	No. 19	Maryland Eastern Shore; Turkey Throwdown	W 109–35	5–1	21 – Knox	9 – Richmond III	6 – Fland	Bud Walton Arena (19,200); Fayetteville, AR
November 28, 2024*; 3:00 p.m., CBS	No. 19	vs. Illinois; Thanksgiving Hoops Showcase [Turkey Throwdown]	L 77–90	5–2	26 – Thiero	6 – Tied	6 – Davis	T-Mobile Center (5,707); Kansas City, MO
December 3, 2024*; 6:00 p.m., ESPN2		at Miami (FL); ACC–SEC Challenge	W 76–73	6–2	18 – Fland	5 – Tied	6 – Fland	Watsco Center (6,389); Coral Gables, FL
December 7, 2024*; 1:00 p.m., SECN+/ESPN+		UTSA	W 75–60	7–2	26 – Thiero	10 – Thiero	7 – Fland	Bud Walton Arena (19,200); Fayetteville, Arkansas
December 10, 2024*; 8:00 p.m., ESPN		vs. No. 14 Michigan; Jimmy V Classic	W 89–87	8–2	20 – Fland	7 – Aidoo	7 – Fland	Madison Square Garden (14,846); New York, NY
December 14, 2024*; 3:00 p.m., SECN+/ESPN+		vs. Central Arkansas	W 82–57	9–2	16 – Fland	7 – Brazile	9 – Fland	Simmons Bank Arena (15,535); North Little Rock, AR
December 21, 2024*; 1:30 p.m., SECN		North Carolina A&T	W 95–67	10–2	17 – Aidoo	11 – Aidoo	11 – Fland	Bud Walton Arena (19,200); Fayetteville, Arkansas
December 30, 2024*; 7:00 p.m., ESPN2	No. 23	Oakland	W 92–62	11–2	22 – Tied	7 – Brazile	6 – Tied	Bud Walton Arena (19,200); Fayetteville, Arkansas
SEC regular season
January 4, 2025; 12:00 p.m., ESPN	No. 23	at No. 1 Tennessee	L 52–76	11–3 (0–1)	17 – Wagner	5 – Tied	3 – Tied	Thompson–Boling Arena (21,678); Knoxville, TN
January 8, 2025; 6:00 p.m., ESPN2		No. 23 Ole Miss	L 66–73	11–4 (0–2)	17 – Thiero	9 – Thiero	5 – Fland	Bud Walton Arena (19,200); Fayetteville, AR
January 11, 2025; 3:00 p.m., ESPN		No. 8 Florida	L 63–71	11–5 (0–3)	17 – Thiero	9 – Aidoo	4 – Fland	Bud Walton Arena (19,200); Fayetteville, AR
January 14, 2025; 8:00 p.m., SECN		at LSU	L 74–78	11–6 (0–4)	19 – Fland	10 – Tied	5 – Fland	Pete Maravich Assembly Center (8,675); Baton Rouge, LA
January 18, 2025; 5:00 p.m., SECN		at Missouri	L 65–83	11–7 (0–5)	14 – Ivisic	10 – Ivisic	6 – Fland	Mizzou Arena (15,061); Columbia, MO
January 22, 2025; 8:00 p.m., SECN		Georgia	W 68–65	12–7 (1–5)	17 – Thiero	11 – Thiero	3 – Wagner	Bud Walton Arena (19,200); Fayetteville, AR
January 25, 2025; 7:30 p.m., ESPN2		Oklahoma	L 62–65	12–8 (1–6)	18 – Davis	6 – Ivisic	5 – Wagner	Bud Walton Arena (19,200); Fayetteville, AR
February 1, 2025; 8:00 p.m., ESPN		at No. 12 Kentucky	W 89–79	13–8 (2–6)	21 – Thiero	8 – Thiero	8 – Wagner	Rupp Arena (21,266); Lexington, KY
February 5, 2025; 8:00 p.m., ESPN2		at Texas	W 78–70	14–8 (3–6)	24 – Davis	12 – Ivisic	4 – Wagner	Moody Center (10,799); Austin, TX
February 8, 2025; 7:00 p.m., ESPN		No. 3 Alabama	L 81–85	14–9 (3–7)	27 – Ivisic	7 – Ivisic	9 – Wagner	Bud Walton Arena (19,200); Fayetteville, AR
February 12, 2025; 8:00 p.m., ESPN2		LSU	W 70–58	15–9 (4–7)	25 – Ivisic	8 – Knox	7 – Wagner	Bud Walton Arena (19,200); Fayetteville, AR
February 15, 2025; 11:00 a.m., ESPN		at No. 8 Texas A&M	L 61–69	15–10 (4–8)	17 – Knox	6 – Tied	4 – Thiero	Reed Arena (10,752); College Station, TX
February 19, 2025; 8:00 p.m., ESPN		at No. 1 Auburn	L 60–67	15–11 (4–9)	16 – Thiero	8 – Ivisic	5 – Wagner	Neville Arena (9,121); Auburn, AL
February 22, 2025; 7:00 p.m., ESPN		No. 15 Missouri	W 92–85	16–11 (5–9)	20 – Ivisic	5 – Theiro	4 – Davis	Bud Walton Arena (19,200); Fayetteville, AR
February 26, 2025; 8:00 p.m., ESPN2		Texas	W 86–81 ^{OT}	17–11 (6–9)	18 – Ivisic	8 – Brazile	5 – Wagner	Bud Walton Arena (19,200); Fayetteville, AR
March 1, 2025; 12:00 p.m., SECN		at South Carolina	L 53–72	17–12 (6–10)	11 – Knox	10 – Aidoo	5 – Knox	Colonial Life Arena (11,754); Columbia, SC
March 4, 2025; 9:00 p.m., SECN		at Vanderbilt	W 90–77	18–12 (7–10)	21 – Davis	14 – Brazile	3 – Wagner	Memorial Gymnasium (8,829); Nashville, TN
March 8, 2025; 11:00 a.m., SECN		No. 25 Mississippi State	W 93–92	19–12 (8–10)	24 – Wagner	11 – Brazile	6 – Richmond III	Bud Walton Arena (19,200); Fayetteville, AR
SEC tournament
March 12, 2025; 12:00 p.m., SECN	(9)	vs. (16) South Carolina; First round	W 72–68	20–12	16 – Brazile	11 – Aidoo	6 – Wagner	Bridgestone Arena (–); Nashville, TN
March 13, 2025; 12:00 p.m., SECN	(9)	vs. (8) Ole Miss; Second round	L 80–83	20–13	17 – Aidoo	11 – Brazile	4 – Tied	Bridgestone Arena (–); Nashville, TN
NCAA Tournament
March 20, 2025; 6:10 p.m., CBS	(10 W)	vs. (7 W) Kansas; First Round	W 79–72	21–13	22 – Aidoo	12 – Brazile	6 – Wagner	Amica Mutual Pavilion (11,434); Providence, RI
March 22, 2025; 1:40 p.m., CBS	(10 W)	vs. (2 W) No. 5 St. John's; Second Round	W 75–66	22–13	16 – Richmond III	9 – Richmond III	4 – Wagner	Amica Mutual Pavilion (11,487); Providence, RI
March 27, 2025; 9:09 p.m., TBS	(10 W)	vs. (3 W) No. 9 Texas Tech; Sweet Sixteen	L 83–85 ^{OT}	22–14	30 – Davis	9 – Aidoo	4 – Wagner	Chase Center (16,417); San Francisco, CA
*Non-conference game. ^{#}Rankings from AP poll. (#) Tournament seedings in parentheses. W=West. All times are in Central Time.

== Rankings ==
Ranking movements Legend: ██ Increase in ranking ██ Decrease in ranking — = Not ranked RV = Received votes
	Week																				
Poll	Pre	1	2	3	4	5	6	7	8	9	10	11	12	13	14	15	16	17	18	19	Final
AP	16	18	20	19	RV	RV	RV	23	23	RV	—	—	—	—	—	—	—	—	—	—	20
Coaches	16	21	24	21	RV	RV	RV	RV	RV	RV	—	—	—	—	—	—	—	—	—	—	25
