= 2024–25 Ole Miss Rebels men's basketball team =

American college basketball season

2024–25 Ole Miss Rebels men's basketball

NCAA tournament, Sweet Sixteen
- Conference: Southeastern Conference

Ranking
- Coaches: No. 18
- AP: No. 18
- Record: 24–12 (10–8 SEC)
- Head coach: Chris Beard (2nd season)
- Assistant coaches: Mark Adams (1st season); Brian Burg (2nd season); Bob Donewald Jr. (2nd season); Wes Flanigan (2nd season); Al Pinkins (2nd, 5th overall season)
- Home arena: SJB Pavilion

2024–25 Southeastern Conference men's basketball standings
	Conf.				Overall
Team	W		L	PCT	W		L	PCT
No. 4 Auburn	15	–	3	.833	32	–	6	.842
No. 1 Florida †	14	–	4	.778	36	–	4	.900
No. 6 Alabama	13	–	5	.722	28	–	9	.757
No. 5 Tennessee	12	–	6	.667	30	–	8	.789
No. 19 Texas A&M	11	–	7	.611	23	–	11	.676
No. 12 Kentucky	10	–	8	.556	24	–	12	.667
Missouri	10	–	8	.556	22	–	12	.647
No. 18 Ole Miss	10	–	8	.556	24	–	12	.667
No. 20 Arkansas	8	–	10	.444	22	–	14	.611
Mississippi State	8	–	10	.444	21	–	13	.618
Georgia	8	–	10	.444	20	–	13	.606
Vanderbilt	8	–	10	.444	20	–	13	.606
Texas	6	–	12	.333	19	–	16	.543
Oklahoma	6	–	12	.333	20	–	14	.588
LSU	3	–	15	.167	14	–	18	.438
South Carolina	2	–	16	.111	12	–	20	.375
† 2025 SEC tournament winner Rankings from AP poll

The 2024–25 Ole Miss Rebels men's basketball team represented the University of Mississippi during the 2024–25 NCAA Division I men's basketball season. The Rebels, led by second-year head coach Chris Beard, played their home games at The Sandy and John Black Pavilion at Ole Miss in Oxford, Mississippi, as members of the Southeastern Conference.

== Previous season ==
The Rebels finished the 2023–24 season 20–12, 7–11 in SEC play to finish in tenth place in the conference.

== Offseason ==
=== Departures ===
Ole Miss Departures
Name	Number	Pos.	Height	Weight	Year	Hometown	Notes	Ref.
Brandon Murray	0	G	6'5"	210	Junior	Germantown, Maryland	Transferred to McNeese	
Austin Nunez	1	G	6'2"	170	Sophomore	Garden Ridge, Texas	Transferred to Arizona State	
Jamarion Sharp	3	F	7'5"	235	Senior	Hopkinsville, Kentucky	Graduated	
Allen Flanigan	7	G	6'6"	215	Senior	Little Rock, Arkansas	Graduated	
Cameron Barnes	23	F	6'9"	195	Freshman	Duncanville, Texas	Transferred to Illinois State	
Rashaud Marshall	25	F	6'8"	220	Freshman	Blytheville, Arkansas	Transferred to Arkansas State	
Moussa Cissé	33	F	7'0"	230	Senior	Conakry, Guinea	Transferred to Memphis	

=== Incoming transfers ===
Incoming transfers
Name	Pos.	Height	Weight	Year	Hometown	Previous School
Mikeal Brown-Jones	F	6'8"	215	Senior	Philadelphia, Pennsylvania	UNC Greensboro
Malik Dia	F	6'7"	190	Junior	Murfreesboro, Tennessee	Belmont
Davon Barnes	F	6'5"	215	Senior	Memphis, Tennessee	Sam Houston
Sean Pedulla	G	6'1"	195	Senior	Edmond, Oklahoma	Virginia Tech
Dre Davis	F	6'5"	220	Senior	Indianapolis, Indiana	Seton Hall
Ja'Von Benson	F	6'7"	250	Senior	Columbia, South Carolina	Hampton

=== 2024 recruiting class ===
College recruiting
Name	Hometown	School	Height	Weight	Commit date
John Bol; C	Boma, South Sudan	Overtime Elite	7 ft 2 in (2.18 m)	190 lb (86 kg)	Jul 31, 2023
John Bol; C	Recruit ratings: Rivals: 247Sports: ESPN: (87)				
Eduardo Klafke; G	Franca, Brazil	NBA Academy	6 ft 4 in (1.93 m)	180 lb (82 kg)	Sep 14, 2023
Eduardo Klafke; G	Recruit ratings: Rivals: 247Sports: ESPN: (77)				
Overall recruit ranking:
Note: In many cases, Scout, Rivals, 247Sports, On3, and ESPN may conflict in their listings of height and weight.; In these cases, the average was taken. ESPN grades are on a 100-point scale.; Sources: "Ole Miss 2024 Basketball Commitments". Rivals.; "2024 Team Ranking". Rivals.

== Roster ==
2024–25 Ole Miss Rebels men's basketball team
Players
Coaches

Pos.	#	Name	Height	Weight	Year	Previous school	Hometown
F	0	Malik Dia	6 ft 9 in (2.06 m)	240 lb (109 kg)	Jr	The Ensworth School; Belmont	Murfreesboro, TN
F	1	Mikeal Brown-Jones	6 ft 8 in (2.03 m)	220 lb (100 kg)	Sr	IMG Academy; UNC Greensboro	Philadelphia, PA
G	2	TJ Caldwell (redshirt)	6 ft 4 in (1.93 m)	190 lb (86 kg)	Jr	Faith Family Academy	Dallas, TX
G	3	Sean Pedulla	6 ft 1 in (1.85 m)	195 lb (88 kg)	Sr	Edmond Memorial HS; Virginia Tech	Edmond, OK
F	4	Jaemyn Brakefield	6 ft 8 in (2.03 m)	220 lb (100 kg)	Sr	Huntington Prep School; Duke	Jackson, MS
G	5	Jaylen Murray	5 ft 11 in (1.8 m)	175 lb (79 kg)	Sr	Putnam Science Academy; Saint Peter's	The Bronx, NY
G	6	Robert Cowherd	6 ft 5 in (1.96 m)	195 lb (88 kg)	Jr	Southern California Academy	Grayson, GA
G	7	Davon Barnes	6 ft 5 in (1.96 m)	215 lb (98 kg)	Sr	Collierville HS; Sam Houston	Memphis, TN
G	8	Eduardo Klafke	6 ft 4 in (1.93 m)	180 lb (82 kg)	Fr	NBA Academy	Franca, Brazil
C	10	John Bol	7 ft 1 in (2.16 m)	190 lb (86 kg)	Fr	Overtime Elite	Boma, South Sudan
G	11	Matthew Murrell	6 ft 4 in (1.93 m)	200 lb (91 kg)	Sr	IMG Academy	Memphis, TN
G/F	14	Dre Davis	6 ft 6 in (1.98 m)	210 lb (95 kg)	Sr	Lawrence Central HS; Seton Hall	Indianapolis, IN
F	21	Ja'Von Benson	6 ft 8 in (2.03 m)	250 lb (113 kg)	Sr	Ridge View HS; Hampton	Columbia, SC
G	22	Max Smith (W)	6 ft 1 in (1.85 m)	175 lb (79 kg)	Sr	Anderson HS	Austin, TX
G	31	Zach Day (W)	6 ft 5 in (1.96 m)	185 lb (84 kg)	Fr	Midland Christian	Midland, TX
G	55	Cam Brent	5 ft 4 in (1.63 m)	125 lb (57 kg)	Sr	Jackson Prep	Jackson, MS

Head coach

- Chris Beard (Texas)

Assistant coach(es)

- Mark Adams (Texas Tech)
- Brian Burg (Mount Mercy)
- Bob Donewald Jr. (Western Michigan)
- Wes Flanigan (Auburn)
- Al Pinkins (NC State)

Legend

- (C) Team captain
- (S) Suspended
- (I) Ineligible
- (W) Walk-on
- Injured
- Current redshirt

Roster

== Schedule and results ==
Date time, TV	Rank^{#}	Opponent^{#}	Result	Record	High points	High rebounds	High assists	Site (attendance) city, state
Exhibition
October 27, 2024*; 11:00 a.m., SECN	No. 24	Illinois; Charity Benefit for CASA of North Mississippi	W 91–74		18 – Dia	8 – Brakefield	8 – Pedulla	SJB Pavilion (7,023); Oxford, MS
Non-conference regular season
November 4, 2024*; 7:30 p.m., SECN+/ESPN+	No. 24	LIU	W 90–60	1–0	24 – Murray	7 – Brakefield	5 – Pedulla	SJB Pavilion (7,982); Oxford, MS
November 8, 2024*; 6:00 p.m., SECN	No. 24	Grambling State	W 66–64	2–0	13 – Davis	11 – Brakefield	4 – Tied	SJB Pavilion (7,314); Oxford, MS
November 12, 2024*; 7:00 p.m., SECN+/ESPN+	No. 25	South Alabama; Bob Weltlich Tad Pad game	W 64–54	3–0	27 – Pedulla	13 – Dia	5 – Murray	Tad Smith Coliseum (4,033); Oxford, MS
November 16, 2024*; 3:00 p.m., SECN+/ESPN+	No. 25	vs. Colorado State	W 84–69	4–0	16 – Murray	5 – Dia	6 – Murray	Landers Center (1,652); Southaven, MS
November 21, 2024*; 7:00 p.m., SECN+/ESPN+		Oral Roberts	W 100–68	5–0	19 – Tied	8 – Dia	6 – Murray	SJB Pavilion (6,873); Oxford, MS
November 28, 2024*; 4:30 p.m., FS1	No. 23	vs. BYU; Rady Children's Invitational semifinal	W 96–85 ^{OT}	6–0	28 – Murray	6 – Tied	5 – Murray	LionTree Arena (4,000); San Diego, CA
November 29, 2024*; 5:00 p.m., FOX	No. 23	vs. No. 13 Purdue; Rady Children's Invitational championship game	L 78–80	6–1	18 – Brakefield	6 – Davis	9 – Murray	LionTree Arena (4,000); San Diego, CA
December 3, 2024*; 8:00 p.m., ACCN	No. 23	at Louisville; ACC–SEC Challenge	W 86–63	7–1	20 – Davis	6 – Dia	7 – Pedulla	KFC Yum! Center (12,729); Louisville, KY
December 7, 2024*; 7:00 p.m., SECN+/ESPN+	No. 23	Lindenwood	W 86–53	8–1	19 – Pedulla	6 – Tied	7 – Murray	SJB Pavilion (7,106); Oxford, MS
December 14, 2024*; 3:00 p.m., SECN+/ESPN+	No. 19	vs. Southern Miss	W 77–46	9–1	18 – Pedulla	11 – Barnes	4 – Tied	Mississippi Coast Coliseum (2,928); Biloxi, MS
December 17, 2024*; 6:00 p.m., SECN+/ESPN+	No. 17	Southern	W 74–61	10–1	18 – Murray	7 – Barnes	7 – Pedulla	SJB Pavilion (6,796); Oxford, MS
December 21, 2024*; 4:00 p.m., SECN+/ESPN+	No. 17	Queens	W 80–62	11–1	25 – Pedulla	6 – Tied	6 – Barnes	SJB Pavilion (7,841); Oxford, MS
December 28, 2024*; 1:00 p.m., ESPN2	No. 16	at Memphis	L 70–87	11–2	13 – Pedulla	6 – Brown-Jones	4 – Pedulla	FedExForum (15,643); Memphis, TN
SEC regular season
January 4, 2025; 11:00 a.m., SECN	No. 24	Georgia	W 63–51	12–2 (1–0)	15 – Tied	7 – Dia	3 – Murrell	SJB Pavilion (8,746); Oxford, MS
January 8, 2025; 6:00 p.m., ESPN2	No. 23	at Arkansas	W 73–66	13–2 (2–0)	21 – Dia	8 – Dia	6 – Murray	Bud Walton Arena (19,200); Fayetteville, AR
January 11, 2025; 5:00 p.m., SECN	No. 23	LSU	W 77–65	14–2 (3–0)	19 – Dia	7 – Dia	6 – Murrell	SJB Pavilion (9,406); Oxford, MS
January 14, 2025; 6:00 p.m., ESPNU	No. 21	at No. 4 Alabama	W 74–64	15–2 (4–0)	23 – Dia	19 – Dia	5 – Murray	Coleman Coliseum (13,474); Tuscaloosa, AL
January 18, 2025; 5:00 p.m., ESPN2	No. 21	at No. 15 Mississippi State	L 81–84 ^{OT}	15–3 (4–1)	20 – Brakefield	7 – Brakefield	4 – Pedulla	Humphrey Coliseum (9,448); Starkville, MS
January 22, 2025; 8:00 p.m., ESPN2	No. 16	No. 13 Texas A&M	L 62–63	15–4 (4–2)	16 – Pedulla	8 – Brakefield	6 – Murray	SJB Pavilion (10,008); Oxford, MS
January 25, 2025; 5:00 p.m., SECN	No. 16	at No. 22 Missouri	L 75–83	15–5 (4–3)	17 – Dia	8 – Dia	6 – Pedulla	Mizzou Arena (15,061); Columbia, MO
January 29, 2025; 8:00 p.m., ESPN2	No. 23	Texas	W 72–69	16–5 (5–3)	19 – Pedulla	7 – Davis	5 – Pedulla	SJB Pavilion (8,480); Oxford, MS
February 1, 2025; 1:00 p.m., ESPN	No. 23	No. 1 Auburn	L 82–92	16–6 (5–4)	29 – Pedulla	5 – Tied	4 – Murray	SJB Pavilion (9,974); Oxford, MS
February 4, 2025; 6:00 p.m., ESPN	No. 25	No. 14 Kentucky	W 98–84	17–6 (6–4)	24 – Murrell	5 – Murrell	10 – Murray	SJB Pavilion (9,128); Oxford, MS
February 8, 2025; 7:30 p.m., SECN	No. 25	at LSU	W 72–70	18–6 (7–4)	22 – Davis	9 – Murrell	4 – Brakefield	Pete Maravich Assembly Center (6,980); Baton Rouge, LA
February 12, 2025; 6:00 p.m., SECN	No. 19	at South Carolina	W 72–68	19–6 (8–4)	18 – Dia	4 – Davis	3 – Brakefield	Colonial Life Arena (10,974); Columbia, SC
February 15, 2025; 5:00 p.m., ESPN2	No. 19	No. 22 Mississippi State	L 71–81	19–7 (8–5)	14 – Murray	8 – Dia	4 – Tied	SJB Pavilion (9,759); Oxford, MS
February 22, 2025; 2:30 p.m., SECN	No. 24	at Vanderbilt	L 72–77	19–8 (8–6)	22 – Dia	7 – Dia	5 – Murray	Memorial Gymnasium (10,494); Nashville, TN
February 26, 2025; 6:00 p.m., ESPN2		at No. 1 Auburn	L 76–106	19–9 (8–7)	14 – Pedulla	4 – Tied	4 – Pedulla	Neville Arena (9,121); Auburn, AL
March 1, 2025; 1:00 p.m., ESPN2		Oklahoma	W 87–84	20–9 (9–7)	26 – Pedulla	5 – Pedulla	3 – Pedulla	SJB Pavilion (8,007); Oxford, MS
March 5, 2025; 8:00 p.m., ESPN2		No. 4 Tennessee	W 78–76	21–9 (10–7)	19 – Brakefield	10 – Davis	6 – Pedulla	SJB Pavilion (9,038); Oxford, MS
March 8, 2025; 5:00 p.m., SECN		at No. 5 Florida	L 71–90	21–10 (10–8)	22 – Pedulla	8 – Dia	4 – Murray	O'Connell Center (11,191); Gainesville, FL
SEC tournament
March 13, 2025; 12:00 pm, SECN	(8)	vs. (9) Arkansas; Second round	W 83−80	22−10	19 – Dia	8 – Tied	5 – Murray	Bridgestone Arena; Nashville, TN
March 14, 2025; 12:00 pm, ESPN	(8)	vs. (1) No. 3 Auburn; Quarterfinal	L 57–62	22–11	12 – Tied	7 – Dia	2 – Tied	Bridgestone Arena; Nashville, TN
NCAA tournament
March 21, 2025; 3:05 pm, TNT	(6 S)	vs. (11 S) North Carolina; First round	W 71–64	23–11	20 – Pedulla	8 – Davis	5 – Pedulla	Fiserv Forum (16,899); Milwaukee, WI
March 23, 2025; 6:45 pm, truTV	(6 S)	vs. (3 S) No. 15 Iowa State; Second round	W 91–78	24–11	20 – Pedulla	8 – Dia	8 – Pedulla	Fiserv Forum (16,829); Milwaukee, WI
March 28, 2025; 6:09 pm, CBS	(6 S)	vs. (2 S) No. 8 Michigan State; Sweet Sixteen	L 70–73	24–12	24 – Pedulla	7 – Brakefield	4 – Pedulla	State Farm Arena (16,743); Atlanta, GA
*Non-conference game. ^{#}Rankings from AP Poll. (#) Tournament seedings in parentheses. S=South. All times are in Central Time.

== Rankings ==
Ranking movements Legend: ██ Increase in ranking ██ Decrease in ranking RV = Received votes
	Week																				
Poll	Pre	1	2	3	4	5	6	7	8	9	10	11	12	13	14	15	16	17	18	19	Final
AP	24	25	RV	23	23	19	17	16	24	23	21	16	23	25	19	24	RV	RV	RV	RV	18
Coaches	25	RV	RV	24	20	15	16	16	23	22	21	16	23	RV	23	RV	RV	RV	RV	RV	18

== See also ==
- 2024–25 Ole Miss Rebels women's basketball team
