= 2024–25 Texas A&M Aggies men's basketball team =

American college basketball season

2024–25 Texas A&M Aggies men's basketball

NCAA tournament, Second Round
- Conference: Southeastern Conference

Ranking
- Coaches: No. 19
- AP: No. 19
- Record: 23–11 (11–7 SEC)
- Head coach: Buzz Williams (6th season)
- Associate head coach: Devin Johnson
- Assistant coaches: Steve Roccaforte; Lyle Wolf
- Home arena: Reed Arena

2024–25 Southeastern Conference men's basketball standings
	Conf.				Overall
Team	W		L	PCT	W		L	PCT
No. 4 Auburn	15	–	3	.833	32	–	6	.842
No. 1 Florida †	14	–	4	.778	36	–	4	.900
No. 6 Alabama	13	–	5	.722	28	–	9	.757
No. 5 Tennessee	12	–	6	.667	30	–	8	.789
No. 19 Texas A&M	11	–	7	.611	23	–	11	.676
No. 12 Kentucky	10	–	8	.556	24	–	12	.667
Missouri	10	–	8	.556	22	–	12	.647
No. 18 Ole Miss	10	–	8	.556	24	–	12	.667
No. 20 Arkansas	8	–	10	.444	22	–	14	.611
Mississippi State	8	–	10	.444	21	–	13	.618
Georgia	8	–	10	.444	20	–	13	.606
Vanderbilt	8	–	10	.444	20	–	13	.606
Texas	6	–	12	.333	19	–	16	.543
Oklahoma	6	–	12	.333	20	–	14	.588
LSU	3	–	15	.167	14	–	18	.438
South Carolina	2	–	16	.111	12	–	20	.375
† 2025 SEC tournament winner Rankings from AP poll

The 2024–25 Texas A&M Aggies men's basketball team represented Texas A&M University during the 2024–25 NCAA Division I men's basketball season. The team was led by sixth-year head coach Buzz Williams and played their home games at Reed Arena located in College Station, Texas as a member of the Southeastern Conference. They finished the season 23–11, 11–7 in SEC play to finish in fifth place. They lost in the second round of the SEC tournament to Texas, 94–89 in double overtime. They received an at-large bid to the NCAA tournament as the No. 4 seed in the South region. They defeated Yale, 80–71, in the first round before losing to Michigan, 91–79, in the second round.

On April 1, 2025, head coach Buzz Williams left the team to become the head coach at Maryland. On April 4, the school named Samford head coach Bucky McMillan the team's new head coach.

== Previous season ==
The Aggies finished the 2023–24 season 21–15, 9–9 in SEC play to finish in a tie for seventh place. As the No. 7 seed in the SEC tournament, they defeated Ole Miss and Kentucky to advance to the semifinals, where they lost to Florida. The Aggies received an at-large bid to the NCAA Tournament as a No. 9 seed in the South Region, where they defeated Nebraska, before falling in overtime to the No 1. seed Houston.

== Offseason ==
=== Departures ===
Departures
Name	Number	Pos.	Height	Weight	Year	Hometown	Reason for departure
Bryce Lindsay	3	G	6'3"	190	Freshman	Baltimore, Maryland	Transferred to James Madison
Eli Lawrence	5	G	6'5"	190	Graduate student	Atlanta, Georgia	Exhausted eligibility
Rob Dockery	9	G/F	6'6"	205	Freshman	Washington, D.C.	Left the team
Wildens Leveque	10	F/C	6'11"	250	Graduate student	Brockton, Massachusetts	Exhausted eligibility
Tyler Ringgold	21	F	6'8"	220	Freshman	Baton Rouge, Louisiana	Transferred to Tulane
Tyrece Radford	23	G	6'3"	190	Graduate student	Baton Rouge, Louisiana	Exhausted eligibility
Brandon White	32	C	6'10"	245	Freshman	Spencer, North Carolina	Transferred to Western Carolina
Julius Marble	34	F	6'9"	235	Senior	Dallas, Texas	Entered the transfer portal

=== Incoming transfers ===
Incoming transfers
Name	Number	Pos.	Height	Weight	Year	Hometown	Previous school
Zhuric Phelps	1	G	6'4"	190	Senior	Midland, Texas	SMU
CJ Wilcher	10	G	6'5"	210	Graduate student	Plainfield, New Jersey	Nebraska
Pharrel Payne	21	F/C	6'9"	250	Junior	Cottage Grove, Minnesota	Minnesota

=== Recruiting class ===
College recruiting
Name	Hometown	School	Height	Weight	Commit date
George Turkson Jr. SF	Lowell, Massachusetts	Bradford Christian Academy	6 ft 7 in (2.01 m)	205 lb (93 kg)	May 10, 2023
George Turkson Jr. SF	Recruit ratings: Rivals: 247Sports: ESPN: (82)				
Andre Mills; SG	Chestnut Hill, Massachusetts	Brimmer and May School	6 ft 4 in (1.93 m)	180 lb (82 kg)	Apr 10, 2023
Andre Mills; SG	Recruit ratings: Rivals: 247Sports: ESPN: (82)				
Chris McDermott; PF	Houston, Texas	Booker T. Washington High School	6 ft 7 in (2.01 m)	215 lb (98 kg)	Apr 30, 2024
Chris McDermott; PF	Recruit ratings: Rivals: 247Sports: ESPN: (N/A)				
Overall recruit ranking:
Note: In many cases, Scout, Rivals, 247Sports, On3, and ESPN may conflict in their listings of height and weight.; In these cases, the average was taken. ESPN grades are on a 100-point scale.; Sources: "2024 Texas A&M Basketball Commits". Rivals.; "2024 Texas A&M Basketball Commits". ESPN.; "2024 Team Ranking". Rivals.

== Preseason ==
On October 14, 2024 the SEC released their preseason media poll. Texas A&M was picked to finish fifth in the SEC regular season. Graduate guard Wade Taylor IV was named to the First Team All-SEC.

=== SEC media poll ===
SEC media poll
Predicted finish	Team
1	Alabama
2	Auburn
3	Tennessee
4	Arkansas
5	Texas A&M
6	Florida
7	Texas
8	Kentucky
9	Ole Miss
10	Mississippi State
11	South Carolina
12	Georgia
13	Missouri
14	LSU
15	Oklahoma
16	Vanderbilt

== Roster ==
2024–25 Texas A&M Aggies men's basketball team
Players
Coaches

Pos.	#	Name	Height	Weight	Year	Previous school	Hometown
G	0	Jace Carter	6 ft 6 in (1.98 m)	225 lb (102 kg)	Sr	UIC	Titusville, Florida
G	1	Zhuric Phelps	6 ft 4 in (1.93 m)	190 lb (86 kg)	Sr	SMU	Midland, Texas
G	2	Hayden Hefner	6 ft 6 in (1.98 m)	190 lb (86 kg)	GS	Nederland High School	Nederland, Texas
G	4	Wade Taylor IV	6 ft 0 in (1.83 m)	180 lb (82 kg)	GS	Lancaster High School	Dallas, Texas
G/F	5	George Turkson Jr.	6 ft 7 in (2.01 m)	220 lb (100 kg)	Fr	Bradford Christian Academy	Lowell, Massachusetts
G	7	Andre Mills	6 ft 4 in (1.93 m)	205 lb (93 kg)	Fr	Brimmer and May School	Boston, Massachusetts
F	9	Solomon Washington	6 ft 7 in (2.01 m)	220 lb (100 kg)	Jr	Carver High School	New Orleans, Louisiana
G	10	CJ Wilcher	6 ft 5 in (1.96 m)	210 lb (95 kg)	GS	Nebraska	Plainfield, New Jersey
F	11	Andersson Garcia	6 ft 7 in (2.01 m)	220 lb (100 kg)	Sr	Mississippi State	Moca, Dominican Republic
F	14	Christopher McDermott	6 ft 7 in (2.01 m)	225 lb (102 kg)	Fr	Booker T. Washington High School	Houston, Texas
F	15	Henry Coleman III	6 ft 8 in (2.03 m)	250 lb (113 kg)	GS	Duke	Richmond, Virginia
F	18	Janusz Ratowski	6 ft 11 in (2.11 m)	225 lb (102 kg)	Fr	SMS PZKosz Władysławowo	Chotomów, Poland
F/C	21	Pharrel Payne	6 ft 9 in (2.06 m)	250 lb (113 kg)	Jr	Minnesota	Cottage Grove, Minnesota
G/F	24	Jaelyn Lee	6 ft 8 in (2.03 m)	200 lb (91 kg)	RS So	Paris High School	Paris, Texas
G	35	Manny Obaseki	6 ft 4 in (1.93 m)	200 lb (91 kg)	Sr	John Paul II High School	Allen, Texas

Head coach

- Buzz Williams (Oklahoma City)

Assistant coach(es)

- Devin Johnson (LSU New Orleans)
- Steve Roccaforte (Lamar)
- Lyle Wolf (Transylvania)
- Vince Walden (Longwood)

Legend

- (C) Team captain
- (S) Suspended
- (I) Ineligible
- (W) Walk-on
- Injured
- Current redshirt

Roster
Last update: December 6, 2024

== Schedule and results ==
Date time, TV	Rank^{#}	Opponent^{#}	Result	Record	High points	High rebounds	High assists	Site (attendance) city, state
Exhibition
October 27, 2024*; 4:00 p.m., ESPN+	No. 13	at No. 4 Houston	L 64–79	–	18 – Taylor IV	6 – Garcia	2 – Garcia	Fertitta Center (5,981); Houston, TX
Non-conference regular season
November 4, 2024*; 6:00 p.m., ESPN+	No. 13	at UCF	L 61–64	0–1	15 – Payne	9 – Washington	7 – Taylor IV	Addition Financial Arena (8,808); Orlando, FL
November 8, 2024*; 7:00 p.m., SECN+/ESPN+	No. 13	East Texas A&M	W 87–55	1–1	18 – Phelps	8 – Tied	6 – Taylor IV	Reed Arena (8,673); College Station, TX
November 11, 2024*; 7:00 p.m., SECN+/ESPN+	No. 23	Lamar	W 97–71	2–1	16 – Phelps	9 – Garcia	7 – Phelps	Reed Arena (7,195); College Station, TX
November 15, 2024*; 8:00 p.m., SECN	No. 23	No. 21 Ohio State	W 78–64	3–1	15 – Tied	8 – Washington	3 – Phelps	Reed Arena (11,658); College Station, TX
November 20, 2024*; 7:00 p.m., SECN+/ESPN+	No. 23	Southern	W 71–54	4–1	17 – Taylor IV	11 – Washington	6 – Taylor IV	Reed Arena (7,061); College Station, TX
November 26, 2024*; 3:30 p.m., TBS	No. 20	vs. Oregon; Players Era Festival Power Tournament	L 70–80	4–2	20 – Phelps	7 – Tied	4 – Tied	MGM Grand Garden Arena; Paradise, NV
November 27, 2024*; 5:30 p.m., Max	No. 20	vs. No. 21 Creighton; Players Era Festival Power Tournament	W 77–73	5–2	18 – Taylor IV	9 – Coleman III	4 – Taylor IV	MGM Grand Garden Arena; Paradise, NV
November 30, 2024*; 2:30 p.m., TruTV	No. 20	vs. Rutgers; Players Era Festival 5th place game	W 81−77	6–2	24 – Taylor IV	6 – Tied	5 – Taylor IV	MGM Grand Garden Arena; Paradise, NV
December 3, 2024*; 8:00 p.m., ESPN2	No. 22	Wake Forest; ACC–SEC Challenge	W 57−44	7–2	15 – Taylor IV	16 – Garcia	4 – Taylor IV	Reed Arena (8,833); College Station, TX
December 8, 2024*; 2:00 p.m., ESPN2	No. 22	vs. Texas Tech; Coast-to-Coast Challenge	W 72–67	8–2	19 – Taylor IV	9 – Washington	4 – Taylor IV	Dickies Arena (12,642); Fort Worth, TX
December 14, 2024*; 11:00 a.m., CBS	No. 17	vs. No. 11 Purdue; Indy Classic	W 70–66	9–2	16 – Tied	9 – Payne	5 – Taylor IV	Gainbridge Fieldhouse (15,045); Indianapolis, IN
December 20, 2024*; 1:00 p.m., SECN+/ESPN+	No. 12	Houston Christian	W 77–45	10–2	19 – Hefner	11 – Washington	4 – Obaseki	Reed Arena (5,023); College Station, TX
December 28, 2024*; 3:00 p.m., SECN	No. 13	Abilene Christian	W 92–54	11–2	15 – Taylor IV	10 – Phelps	10 – Taylor IV	Reed Arena (11,086); College Station, TX
SEC regular season
January 4, 2025; 7:00 p.m., SECN	No. 13	Texas; Lone Star Showdown	W 80–60	12–2 (1–0)	18 – Phelps	10 – Washington	4 – Phelps	Reed Arena (12,236); College Station, TX
January 8, 2025; 8:00 p.m., SECN	No. 10	at No. 17 Oklahoma	W 80–78	13–2 (2–0)	34 – Phelps	6 – Washington	4 – Obaseki	Lloyd Noble Center (7,604); Norman, OK
January 11, 2025; 7:00 p.m., ESPN	No. 10	No. 5 Alabama	L 88–94	13–3 (2–1)	24 – Phelps	11 – Coleman III	3 – Phelps	Reed Arena (12,997); College Station, TX
January 14, 2025; 6:00 p.m., ESPN2	No. 11	at No. 8 Kentucky	L 69–81	13–4 (2–2)	21 – Phelps	7 – Phelps	2 – Phelps	Rupp Arena (20,039); Lexington, KY
January 18, 2025; 7:30 p.m., SECN	No. 11	LSU	W 68–57	14–4 (3–2)	13 – Phelps	7 – Tied	6 – Phelps	Reed Arena (12,812); College Station, TX
January 22, 2025; 8:00 p.m., ESPN2	No. 13	at No. 16 Ole Miss	W 63–62	15–4 (4–2)	14 – Phelps	7 – Washington	5 – Taylor IV	SJB Pavilion (10,008); Oxford, MS
January 25, 2025; 1:30 p.m., ESPN2	No. 13	at Texas; Lone Star Showdown	L 69–70	15–5 (4–3)	15 – Taylor IV	5 – Tied	3 – Tied	Moody Center (11,313); Austin, TX
January 28, 2025; 8:00 p.m., SECN	No. 13	Oklahoma	W 75–68	16–5 (5–3)	15 – Phelps	11 – Payne	3 – Taylor IV	Reed Arena (9,379); College Station, TX
February 1, 2025; 7:30 p.m., SECN	No. 13	at South Carolina	W 76–72	17–5 (6–3)	25 – Taylor IV	8 – Coleman III	3 – Phelps	Colonial Life Arena (12,856); Columbia, SC
February 8, 2025; 2:30 p.m., SECN	No. 10	at No. 15 Missouri	W 67–64	18–5 (7–3)	20 – Payne	16 – Coleman III	3 – Tied	Mizzou Arena (15,061); Columbia, MO
February 11, 2025; 8:00 p.m., SECN	No. 8	Georgia	W 69–53	19–5 (8–3)	17 – Washington	6 – Coleman III	6 – Taylor IV	Reed Arena (9,283); College Station, TX
February 15, 2025; 11:00 a.m., ESPN	No. 8	Arkansas	W 69–61	20–5 (9–3)	18 – Taylor IV	9 – Phelps	9 – Taylor IV	Reed Arena (10,752); College Station, TX
February 18, 2025; 6:00 p.m., SECN	No. 7	at No. 21 Mississippi State	L 54–70	20–6 (9–4)	13 – Phelps	10 – Garcia	4 – Taylor IV	Humphrey Coliseum (9,313); Starkville, MS
February 22, 2025; 11:00 a.m., ESPN	No. 7	No. 6 Tennessee	L 69–77	20–7 (9–5)	18 – Taylor IV	11 – Phelps	9 – Taylor IV	Reed Arena (12,989); College Station, TX
February 25, 2025; 6:00 p.m., SECN	No. 12	Vanderbilt	L 84–86	20–8 (9–6)	23 – Payne	11 – Garcia	6 – Taylor IV	Reed Arena (9,287); College Station, TX
March 1, 2025; 7:30 p.m., SECN	No. 12	at No. 3 Florida; College GameDay	L 70–89	20–9 (9–7)	16 – Phelps	8 – Payne	1 – Tied	Exactech Arena (10,784); Gainesville, FL
March 4, 2025; 8:00 p.m., ESPN	No. 22	No. 1 Auburn	W 83–72	21–9 (10–7)	19 – Phelps	11 – Garcia	5 – Garcia	Reed Arena (12,257); College Station, TX
March 8, 2025; 3:00 p.m., SECN	No. 22	at LSU	W 66–52	22–9 (11–7)	17 – Taylor IV	10 – Coleman III	2 – Obaseki	Pete Maravich Assembly Center (6,768); Baton Rouge, LA
SEC Tournament
March 13, 2025; 2:30 p.m., ESPN/SECN	(5) No. 14	vs. (13) Texas; Second Round	L 89–94 ^{2OT}	22–10	29 – Taylor IV	13 – Coleman III	3 – Taylor IV	Bridgestone Arena (13,558); Nashville, TN
NCAA Tournament
March 20, 2025*; 6:25 p.m., TBS	(4 S) No. 19	vs. (13 S) Yale; First Round	W 80–71	23–10	25 – Payne	10 – Payne	5 – Taylor IV	Ball Arena; Denver, CO
March 22, 2025*; 4:15 p.m., CBS	(4 S) No. 19	vs. (5 S) No. 14 Michigan; Second Round	L 79–91	23–11	26 – Payne	7 – Phelps	6 – Phelps	Ball Arena (19,302); Denver, CO
*Non-conference game. ^{#}Rankings from AP Poll. (#) Tournament seedings in parentheses. S=South. All times are in Central Time.

== Rankings ==
Ranking movements Legend: ██ Increase in ranking ██ Decrease in ranking
	Week																				
Poll	Pre	1	2	3	4	5	6	7	8	9	10	11	12	13	14	15	16	17	18	19	Final
AP	13	23	23	20	22	17	12	13	13	10	11	13	13	10	8	7	12	22	14	19	19
Coaches	15	23	23	20	24	18	11	13	12	9	11	13	15	13	9	7	11	21	16	18	19
