= 2024–25 Missouri Tigers men's basketball team =

American college basketball season

2024–25 Missouri Tigers men's basketball

NCAA tournament, First Round
- Conference: Southeastern Conference
- Record: 22–12 (10–8 SEC)
- Head coach: Dennis Gates (3rd season)
- Associate head coach: Charlton Young (3rd season)
- Assistant coaches: Kyle Smithpeters (3rd season); Rob Summers (1st season); Ryan Sharbaugh (2nd season); Matt Cline (2nd season)
- Home arena: Mizzou Arena

2024–25 Southeastern Conference men's basketball standings
	Conf.				Overall
Team	W		L	PCT	W		L	PCT
No. 4 Auburn	15	–	3	.833	32	–	6	.842
No. 1 Florida †	14	–	4	.778	36	–	4	.900
No. 6 Alabama	13	–	5	.722	28	–	9	.757
No. 5 Tennessee	12	–	6	.667	30	–	8	.789
No. 19 Texas A&M	11	–	7	.611	23	–	11	.676
No. 12 Kentucky	10	–	8	.556	24	–	12	.667
Missouri	10	–	8	.556	22	–	12	.647
No. 18 Ole Miss	10	–	8	.556	24	–	12	.667
No. 20 Arkansas	8	–	10	.444	22	–	14	.611
Mississippi State	8	–	10	.444	21	–	13	.618
Georgia	8	–	10	.444	20	–	13	.606
Vanderbilt	8	–	10	.444	20	–	13	.606
Texas	6	–	12	.333	19	–	16	.543
Oklahoma	6	–	12	.333	20	–	14	.588
LSU	3	–	15	.167	14	–	18	.438
South Carolina	2	–	16	.111	12	–	20	.375
† 2025 SEC tournament winner Rankings from AP poll

The 2024–25 Missouri Tigers men's basketball team represented the University of Missouri in the 2024–25 NCAA Division I men's basketball season and is led by third year head coach Dennis Gates. The team plays its home games at Mizzou Arena in Columbia, Missouri as a thirteenth-year member of the Southeastern Conference.

== Previous season ==
The Tigers finished the season 8–24, 0–18 in SEC play and finishing last place. The Tigers started the season going 8–5 with big wins over Minnesota and Pittsburgh in non-conference play. After non-conference play ended, the Tigers lost 18 conference games in a row with close games coming against South Carolina in overtime and Ole Miss. The Tigers finished the season in 14th place in the 2024 SEC men's basketball tournament with a first-round matchup against 11 seed Georgia. The Tigers lost to the Bulldogs 64–59.

== Offseason ==
=== Departures ===
Name	Number	Pos.	Height	Weight	Year	Hometown	Reason for departure
Jordan Butler	0	C	6'11'	215	Freshman	Greenville, SC	Transferred to South Carolina
Kaleb Brown	1	G	6'7"	250	Junior	Huntsville, AL	Transferred to Cal State Fullerton
Curt Lewis	4	G	6'5"	220	Junior	Louisville, KY	Transferred to East Tennessee State
John Tonje	5	F	6'5"	210	Senior	Omaha, NE	Transferred to Wisconsin
Nick Honor	10	G	5'10"	200	Graduate Student	Orlando, FL	Graduated
Jackson Francois	12	G	6'4"	155	Sophomore	Las Vegas, NV	Transferred to Arizona
Jesús Carralero	13	F	6'8"	220	Senior	Málaga, Spain	Entered Transfer Portal
Noah Carter	35	F	6'6"	235	Senior	Dubuque, IA	Graduated
Mabor Majak	45	C	7'2"	245	Senior	Biemnom, South Sudan	Transferred to Coastal Carolina
Sean East II	55	G	6'3"	180	Senior	Louisville, KY	Graduated
Connor Vanover	75	C	7'5"	227	Senior	Little Rock, AR	Graduated

=== Incoming transfers ===
Name	Number	Pos.	Height	Weight	Year	Hometown	Previous school
Marques Warrick	1	G	6'2"	185	Senior	Lexington, KY	Transfer from Northern Kentucky
Tony Perkins	12	G	6'4"	205	Senior	Indianapolis, IN	Transfer from Iowa
Mark Mitchell	25	F	6'8"	232	Junior	Kansas City, KS	Transfer from Duke
Josh Gray	33	C	7'0"	265	Senior	Brooklyn, NY	Transfer from South Carolina
Jacob Crews	35	G/F	6'7"	220	Junior	Hilliard, FL	Transfer from UT Martin

==== 2024 recruiting class ====
College recruiting information
Name	Hometown	School	Height	Weight	Commit date
T.O. Barrett; G	Edmond, OK	Link Academy	6 ft 4 in (1.93 m)	180 lb (82 kg)	Jun 29, 2023
T.O. Barrett; G	Recruit ratings: Rivals: 247Sports: ESPN: (79)				
Peyton Marshall; C	Marietta, GA	Carlton J. Kell High School	7 ft 0 in (2.13 m)	210 lb (95 kg)	Aug 11, 2023
Peyton Marshall; C	Recruit ratings: Rivals: 247Sports: ESPN: (81)				
Marcus Allen; F	Miami, FL	Miami Norland Senior High School	6 ft 6 in (1.98 m)	190 lb (86 kg)	Aug 7, 2023
Marcus Allen; F	Recruit ratings: Rivals: 247Sports: ESPN: (85)				
Annor Boateng; F	Little Rock, AR	Little Rock Central High School	6 ft 4 in (1.93 m)	185 lb (84 kg)	Sep 22, 2023
Annor Boateng; F	Recruit ratings: Rivals: 247Sports: ESPN: (88)				
Trent Burns; C	Houston, TX	Pro-Vision Academy	7 ft 2 in (2.18 m)	210 lb (95 kg)	Oct 1, 2023
Trent Burns; C	Recruit ratings: Rivals: 247Sports: ESPN: (82)				
Overall recruit ranking: Scout: 12 Rivals: 6
Note: In many cases, Scout, Rivals, 247Sports, On3, and ESPN may conflict in their listings of height and weight.; In these cases, the average was taken. ESPN grades are on a 100-point scale.; Sources:

==== 2025 recruiting class ====
College recruiting information (2025)
Name	Hometown	School	Height	Weight	Commit date
Aaron Rowe; G	Columbia, MO	Tolton High School	6 ft 0 in (1.83 m)	150 lb (68 kg)	Dec 12, 2023
Aaron Rowe; G	Recruit ratings: Rivals: 247Sports: ESPN: (89)				
Overall recruit ranking: Scout: 10 Rivals: 5
Note: In many cases, Scout, Rivals, 247Sports, On3, and ESPN may conflict in their listings of height and weight.; In these cases, the average was taken. ESPN grades are on a 100-point scale.; Sources:

== Roster ==
2024–25 Missouri Tigers men's basketball team
Players
Coaches

Pos.	#	Name	Height	Weight	Year	Previous school	Hometown
G	0	Anthony Robinson II	6 ft 3 in (1.91 m)	180 lb (82 kg)	So	Florida State University School	Tallahassee, FL
G	1	Marques Warrick	6 ft 3 in (1.91 m)	190 lb (86 kg)	GS	Henry Clay High School; Northern Kentucky	Lexington, KY
G	2	Tamar Bates	6 ft 5 in (1.96 m)	195 lb (88 kg)	Sr	IMG Academy; Indiana	Kansas City, KS
G/F	4	Marcus Allen	6 ft 7 in (2.01 m)	220 lb (100 kg)	Fr	Miami Norland Senior High School	Miami, FL
G	5	T.O. Barrett	6 ft 4 in (1.93 m)	200 lb (91 kg)	Fr	Link Academy	Edmond, OK
G	6	Annor Boateng	6 ft 6 in (1.98 m)	215 lb (98 kg)	Fr	Little Rock Central High School	Little Rock, AR
C	7	Trent Burns	7 ft 5 in (2.26 m)	235 lb (107 kg)	Fr	Pro-Vision Academy	Houston, TX
G	10	Jeremy Sanchez (W)	6 ft 0 in (1.83 m)	180 lb (82 kg)	GS	North Ridgeville High School; Saint Leo	North Ridgeville, OH
G/F	11	Trent Pierce	6 ft 10 in (2.08 m)	220 lb (100 kg)	So	Compass Prep	Tulsa, OK
G	12	Tony Perkins	6 ft 4 in (1.93 m)	200 lb (91 kg)	GS	Lawrence North High School; Iowa	Indianapolis, IN
G/F	15	Danny Stephens (W)	6 ft 7 in (2.01 m)	230 lb (104 kg)	RS Fr	Southeastern High School	Augusta, IL
G	17	JV Brown (W)	6 ft 5 in (1.96 m)	200 lb (91 kg)	RS Fr	Rolling Hills Prep	San Pedro, CA
C	21	Peyton Marshall	7 ft 0 in (2.13 m)	300 lb (136 kg)	Fr	Carlton J. Kell High School	Marietta, GA
G/F	23	Aidan Shaw	6 ft 9 in (2.06 m)	210 lb (95 kg)	Jr	Blue Valley High School	Stillwell, KS
G/F	25	Mark Mitchell	6 ft 9 in (2.06 m)	230 lb (104 kg)	Jr	Sunrise Christian Academy; Duke	Kansas City, KS
G	31	Caleb Grill	6 ft 3 in (1.91 m)	205 lb (93 kg)	GS	Maize High School; Iowa State	Maize, KS
C	33	Josh Gray	7 ft 0 in (2.13 m)	260 lb (118 kg)	GS	Putnam Science Academy; LSU; South Carolina	Brooklyn, NY
G/F	35	Jacob Crews	6 ft 8 in (2.03 m)	210 lb (95 kg)	Sr	Superior Collegiate Academy; UT Martin	Hilliard, FL

Head coach

- Dennis Gates (California)

Assistant coach(es)

- Charlton Young (Georgia Southern)
- Kyle Smithpeters (Southern Illinois)
- Rob Summers (West Virginia)
- Ryan Sharbaugh (Westminster College)
- Matt Cline (South Alabama)

Legend

- (C) Team captain
- (S) Suspended
- (I) Ineligible
- (W) Walk-on
- Injured
- Current redshirt

Roster

== Schedule and results ==
Date time, TV	Rank^{#}	Opponent^{#}	Result	Record	High points	High rebounds	High assists	Site (attendance) city, state
Exhibition
October 26, 2024*; 12:30 p.m.		Lincoln (MO)	W 90–45	–	–	–	–	Mizzou Arena; Columbia, MO
Non-conference regular season
November 4, 2024*; 7:00 p.m., ESPN+		at Memphis	L 75–83	0–1	16 – Robinson	7 – Mitchell	7 – Robinson	FedExForum (11,709); Memphis, TN
November 8, 2024*; 7:00 p.m., SECN+/ESPN+		Howard	W 77–62	1–1	17 – Bates	8 – Mitchell	2 – Tied	Mizzou Arena (11,044); Columbia, MO
November 11, 2024*; 6:00 p.m., SECN+/ESPN+		Eastern Washington	W 84–77	2–1	33 – Grill	9 – Grill	5 – Perkins	Mizzou Arena (8,912); Columbia, MO
November 14, 2024*; 6:30 p.m., SECN+/ESPN+		Mississippi Valley State	W 111–39	3–1	16 – Warrick	6 – Shaw	4 – Warrick	Mizzou Arena (8,889); Columbia, MO
November 22, 2024*; 6:30 p.m., SECN+/ESPN+		Pacific; Missouri Multi-Team Event	W 91–56	4–1	25 – Grill	7 – Gray	5 – Warrick	Mizzou Arena (9,564); Columbia, MO
November 24, 2024*; 4:00 p.m., SECN+/ESPN+		Arkansas–Pine Bluff; Missouri Multi-Team Event	W 112–63	5–1	20 – Mitchell	11 – Robinson	11 – Robinson	Mizzou Arena (8,496); Columbia, MO
November 27, 2024*; 5:30 p.m., SECN+/ESPN+		Lindenwood	W 81–61	6–1	18 – Perkins	8 – Gray	5 – Robinson	Mizzou Arena (9,298); Columbia, MO
December 3, 2024*; 6:00 p.m., SECN		California; ACC–SEC Challenge	W 98–93	7–1	29 – Robinson	5 – Tied	6 – Robinson	Mizzou Arena (9,791); Columbia, MO
December 8, 2024*; 12:00 p.m., ESPN2		No. 1 Kansas; Border War	W 76–67	8–1	29 – Bates	10 – Gray	3 – Robinson II	Mizzou Arena (15,061); Columbia, MO
December 14, 2024*; 11:00 a.m., SECN+/ESPN+		LIU	W 88–61	9–1	24 – Pierce	7 – Mitchell	5 – Mitchell	Mizzou Arena (8,969); Columbia, MO
December 17, 2024*; 6:30 p.m., SECN+/ESPN+		Jacksonville State	W 83–72	10–1	19 – Crews	5 – Mitchell	6 – Mitchell	Mizzou Arena (8,515); Columbia, MO
December 22, 2024*; 12:00 p.m., ESPN		vs. Illinois; Braggin' Rights	L 77–80	10–2	18 – Tied	6 – Tied	3 – Perkins	Enterprise Center (18,497); St. Louis, MO
December 30, 2024*; 6:30 p.m., SECN+/ESPN+		Alabama State	W 82–65	11–2	16 – Bates	8 – Pierce	4 – Warrick	Mizzou Arena (9,981); Columbia, MO
SEC regular season
January 4, 2025; 3:00 p.m., SECN		at No. 2 Auburn	L 68–84	11–3 (0–1)	19 – Warrick	6 – Grill	3 – Perkins	Neville Arena (9,121); Auburn, AL
January 7, 2025; 8:00 p.m., SECN		LSU	W 83–67	12–3 (1–1)	20 – Bates	10 – Gray	4 – Robinson	Mizzou Arena (10,367); Columbia, MO
January 11, 2025; 2:30 p.m., SECN		Vanderbilt	W 75–66	13–3 (2–1)	19 – Mitchell	11 – Gray	8 – Robinson	Mizzou Arena (15,061); Columbia, MO
January 14, 2025; 8:00 p.m., ESPNU		at No. 5 Florida	W 83–82	14–3 (3–1)	22 – Grill	8 – Mitchell	3 – Bates	O'Connell Center (10,491); Gainesville, FL
January 18, 2025; 5:00 p.m., SECN		Arkansas	W 83–65	15–3 (4–1)	17 – Mitchell	6 – Robinson	4 – Mitchell	Mizzou Arena (15,061); Columbia, MO
January 21, 2025; 8:00 p.m., SECN	No. 22	at Texas	L 53–61	15–4 (4–2)	10 – Bates	6 – Mitchell	3 – Perkins	Moody Center (11,267); Austin, TX
January 25, 2025; 5:00 p.m., SECN	No. 22	No. 16 Ole Miss	W 83–75	16–4 (5–2)	26 – Bates	7 – Robinson	3 – Mitchell	Mizzou Arena (15,061); Columbia, MO
February 1, 2025; 12:00 p.m., SECN	No. 20	at No. 14 Mississippi State	W 88–61	17–4 (6–2)	20 – Grill	11 – Gray	5 – Perkins	Humphrey Coliseum (9,584); Starkville, MS
February 5, 2025; 6:00 p.m., SECN	No. 15	at No. 4 Tennessee	L 81–85	17–5 (6–3)	22 – Bates	10 – Gray	5 – Perkins	Thompson–Boling Arena (20,002); Knoxville, TN
February 8, 2025; 2:30 p.m., SECN	No. 15	No. 10 Texas A&M	L 64–67	17–6 (6–4)	16 – Bates	6 – Allen	4 – Warrick	Mizzou Arena (15,061); Columbia, MO
February 12, 2025; 8:00 p.m., SECN	No. 21	Oklahoma	W 82–58	18–6 (7–4)	25 – Mitchell	7 – Mitchell	3 – Grill	Mizzou Arena (12,403); Columbia, MO
February 15, 2025; 2:30 p.m., SECN	No. 21	at Georgia	W 87–74	19–6 (8–4)	15 – Tied	5 – Tied	7 – Robinson	Stegeman Coliseum (9,653); Athens, GA
February 19, 2025; 8:00 p.m., SECN	No. 15	No. 4 Alabama	W 110–98	20–6 (9–4)	31 – Mitchell	10 – Grill	5 – Pierce	Mizzou Arena (15,061); Columbia, MO
February 22, 2025; 7:00 p.m., ESPN	No. 15	at Arkansas	L 85–92	20–7 (9–5)	17 – Mitchell	7 – Mitchell	5 – Robinson	Bud Walton Arena (19,200); Fayetteville, AR
February 25, 2025; 8:00 p.m., ESPNU	No. 14	South Carolina	W 101–71	21–7 (10–5)	22 – Grill	5 – Tied	8 – Robinson	Mizzou Arena (12,595); Columbia, MO
March 1, 2025; 5:00 p.m., SECN	No. 14	at Vanderbilt	L 93–97 ^{OT}	21–8 (10–6)	28 – Grill	7 – Mitchell	5 – Robinson	Memorial Gymnasium (10,311); Nashville, TN
March 5, 2025; 7:00 p.m., SECN+/ESPN+	No. 15	at Oklahoma	L 84–96	21–9 (10–7)	18 – Mitchell	8 – Grill	5 – Warrick	Lloyd Noble Center (7,317); Norman, OK
March 8, 2025; 11:00 a.m., ESPN	No. 15	No. 19 Kentucky	L 83–91	21–10 (10–8)	22 – Mitchell	8 – Gray	7 – Mitchell	Mizzou Arena (15,061); Columbia, MO
SEC Tournament
March 13, 2025; 6:00 p.m., SECN	(7) No. 21	vs. (10) Mississippi State; Second round	W 85–73	22–10	25 – Bates	12 – Gray	4 – Robinson, Perkins	Bridgestone Arena (16,347); Nashville, TN
March 14, 2025; 6:00 p.m., SECN	(7) No. 21	vs. (2) No. 4 Florida; Quarterfinals	L 81–95	22–11	16 – Bates	4 – Perkins	3 – Robinson, Perkins	Bridgestone Arena (18,608); Nashville, TN
NCAA Tournament
March 20, 2025; 6:35 p.m., TruTV	(6 W) No. 23	vs. (11 W) Drake; First Round	L 57–67	22–12	14 – Grill	8 – Mitchell	2 – Tied	Intrust Bank Arena; Wichita, KS
*Non-conference game. ^{#}Rankings from AP Poll. (#) Tournament seedings in parentheses. W=West. All times are in Central Time.

== Rankings ==
Ranking movements Legend: ██ Increase in ranking ██ Decrease in ranking — = Not ranked RV = Received votes
	Week																				
Poll	Pre	1	2	3	4	5	6	7	8	9	10	11	12	13	14	15	16	17	18	19	Final
AP	—	—	—	—	—	RV	RV	RV	RV	RV	RV	22	20	15	21	15	14	15	21	23	RV
Coaches	—	—	—	—	—	RV	RV	RV	RV	—	RV	24	21	16	22	16	16	19	22	24	RV
