= Josh Hubbard =

American basketball player (born 2004)

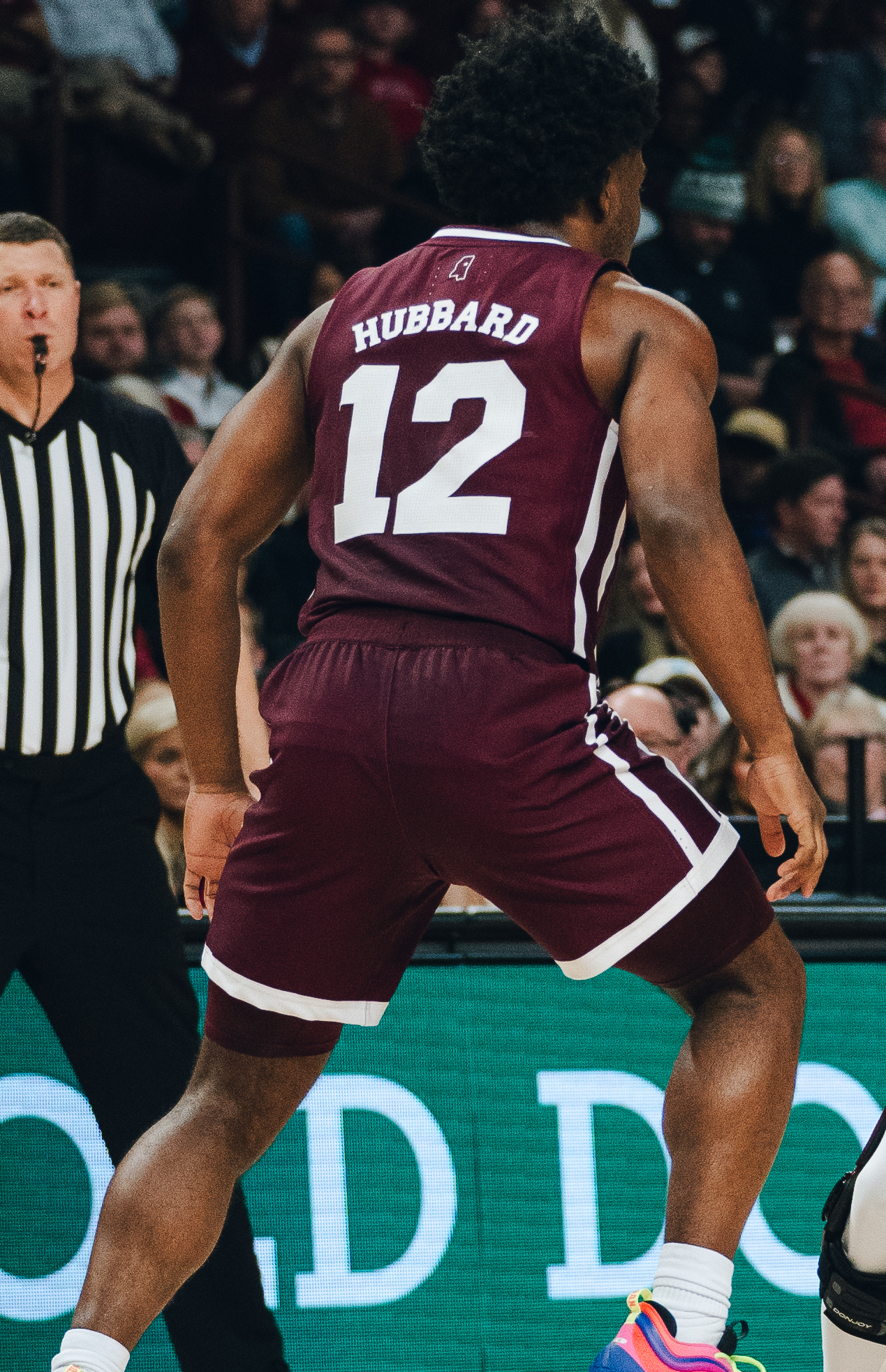

No. 12 – Mississippi State Bulldogs
- Position: Point guard
- League: Southeastern Conference

Personal information
- Born: December 27, 2004 (age 21)
- Listed height: 6 ft 0 in (1.83 m)
- Listed weight: 190 lb (86 kg)

Career information
- High school: Madison-Ridgeland Academy (Madison, Mississippi)
- College: Mississippi State (2023–present)

Career highlights
- Second-team All-SEC (2025); Third-team All-SEC (2026)

Josh Hubbard (born December 27, 2004) is an American college basketball point guard for the Mississippi State Bulldogs of the Southeastern Conference (SEC).

== High school career ==
Hubbard attended Madison-Ridgeland Academy in Madison, Mississippi. As a senior, he averaged 27.1 points, 5.5 rebounds, 4.9 assists and 1.1 steals per game and was named the Mississippi Gatorade Player of the Year. Hubbard finished his high school career totaling 4,367 points, becoming Mississippi's all-time leading scorer. Hubbard was originally committed to play for the Ole Miss Rebels before decommitting after Rebels head coach Kermit Davis was fired. A four-star recruit, he committed to play college basketball at Mississippi State University over offers from Georgetown, Houston, and LSU.

== College career ==
As a freshman, Hubbard averaged 17.1 points per game and made 108 threes, leading the SEC. As a result, he was named the winner of the Howell Trophy, becoming the first freshman to receive the award.

On November 9, 2026, Hubbard scored his 2,000th career point in a rout of Jackson State.

== Career statistics ==
Legend
GP	Games played	GS	Games started	MPG	Minutes per game
FG%	Field goal percentage	3P%	3-point field goal percentage	FT%	Free throw percentage
RPG	Rebounds per game	APG	Assists per game	SPG	Steals per game
BPG	Blocks per game	PPG	Points per game	**Bold**	Career high

=== College ===
Year	Team	GP	GS	MPG	FG%	3P%	FT%	RPG	APG	SPG	BPG	PPG
2023–24	Mississippi State	35	16	27.7	.385	.355	.853	2.2	1.7	.7	.1	17.1
2024–25	Mississippi State	34	34	32.9	.402	.345	.878	2.1	3.1	.9	.1	18.9
2025–26	Mississippi State	32	32	33.3	.422	.347	.750	2.5	3.6	1.2	.1	22.1

== Personal life ==
Hubbard is third cousins with former NBA all-star and Nasmith Hall of Fame inductee, Dwyane Wade.
