= Billy Richmond =

American basketball player

No. 24 – Arkansas Razorbacks
- Position: Small forward
- League: Southeastern Conference

Personal information
- Born: April 11, 2006 (age 20)
- Listed height: 6 ft 7 in (2.01 m)
- Listed weight: 205 lb (93 kg)

Career information
- High school: East (Memphis, Tennessee); Camden (Camden, New Jersey)
- College: Arkansas (2024–present)

Career highlights
- SEC All-Defensive Team (2026)

Billy Richmond III (born April 11, 2006) is an American college basketball player for the Arkansas Razorbacks of the Southeastern Conference (SEC).

== Early life and high school ==
Richmond grew up in Memphis, Tennessee and initially attended East High School. After his sophomore year he transferred to Camden High School in Camden, New Jersey. Richmond averaged 17.6 points, 7.4 rebounds, and 2.6 assists per game as a senior.

Richmond was a consensus top-40 prospect in the 2024 recruiting class. He initially committed to play college basketball at Kentucky over offers from Memphis, Alabama, and LSU. Richmond later decommitted after it was reported that Kentucky head coach John Calipari would be leaving the program to become the head coach at Arkansas. He ultimately opted to follow Calipari and committed to play at Arkansas.

== College career ==
Richmond played in all 36 of the Razorbacks' games during his freshman season and averaged 5.7 points, 3.0 rebounds, and 1.4 assists per game. Following the season's conclusion, Richmond declared for the 2026 NBA draft, On May 1, Richmond, along with four teammates from Arkansas, were invited to the 2026 NBA Draft Combine.

== Personal life ==
Richmond's father, Billy Richmond Jr., played college basketball at Vanderbilt and Memphis, where he played for John Calipari. Richmond's brother, Trevor Richmond, plays high school basketball at Collierville High School.
