= Arizona Tip-Off =

College basketball competition

Tournament information
- Sport: College basketball
- Location: Mullett Arena, Tempe, Arizona
- Month played: November
- Established: 2023
- Defunct: 2025
- Administrator: Intersport
- Teams: 8
- Website: Arizona Tip-Off

Final champion
- Butler (Cactus Division); Weber State (Desert Division)

The Arizona Tip-Off was a college basketball tournament held in November annually that began during the 2023–24 season. Games are played at Mullett Arena in Tempe, Arizona.

== Brackets ==
* – Denotes overtime period

=== 2024 ===
The 2024 Arizona Tip–Off will feature eight teams split into two brackets Cactus and Desert. Cactus Division games will be televised on CBS Sports Network.

==== Cactus Division ====
First round November 28; CBSSN
Butler	71
Northwestern	69
UNLV	58
25	Mississippi State	80

Championship game November 29; CBSSN
Butler	87
25	Mississippi State	77
Third-Place Game; November 29; CBSSN
Northwestern	66
UNLV	61

==== Desert Division ====
First round November 29
Weber State	73
Bowling Green	70
Pepperdine	82
New Mexico State	70

Championship game November 30
Weber State	68
Pepperdine	53
Third-Place Game; November 30
Bowling Green	61
New Mexico State	60

=== 2023 ===
The inaugural edition of the Arizona Tip-Off in 2023 featured eight teams split into two brackets Cactus and Desert. All games in the Cactus Division were televised on CBS Sports Network.

==== Cactus Division ====
First round November 17; CBSSN
Grand Canyon	76
San Francisco	72
DePaul	68
South Carolina	73

Championship game November 19; CBSSN
Grand Canyon	68
South Carolina	75
Third Place game November 19; CBSSN
San Francisco	70
DePaul	54

==== Desert Division ====
First round November 17
VMI	81
South Dakota	85
Purdue Fort Wayne	77
Northern Arizona	67

Championship game November 18
South Dakota	81
Purdue Fort Wayne	83
Third Place game November 27
VMI	69
Northern Arizona	78
