= Matthew Murrell =

American basketball player (born 2001)

No. 11 – Salt Lake City Stars
- Position: Point guard / shooting guard
- League: NBA G League

Personal information
- Born: December 19, 2001 (age 24) Memphis, Tennessee, U.S.
- Listed height: 6 ft 3 in (1.91 m)
- Listed weight: 200 lb (91 kg)

Career information
- High school: Whitehaven (Memphis, Tennessee); IMG Academy (Bradenton, Florida)
- College: Ole Miss (2020–2025)
- NBA draft: 2025: undrafted
- Playing career: 2025–present

Career history
- 2025–present: Salt Lake City Stars

Career highlights
- Second-team All-SEC (2024)
- Stats at NBA.com
- Stats at Basketball Reference

Matthew Everett Murrell (born December 19, 2001) is an American basketball player for the Salt Lake City Stars of the NBA G League. He played college basketball for the Ole Miss Rebels.

== Early life and high school ==
Murrell attended his first three years at Whitehaven High School located in Memphis, Tennessee, before transferring to IMG Academy for his senior year. Coming out of high school, he was rated as a four star recruit, where he committed to play college basketball for the Ole Miss Rebels over other offers from schools such as Vanderbilt, Texas, Auburn, and Florida.

== College career ==
During his freshman season in 2020-21, Murrell played in 28 games with three starts, averaging 4.2 points per game. He finished the 2021-22 season, averaging 12.1 points, 3.0 rebounds and 1.7 assists per game, where he also shot 42.7% from the field and 38.6% from three-point range. On November 8, 2022, he dropped 20 points in a season-opening win versus Alcorn State. During the 2022-23 season, Murrell averaged 14.4 points per game, while shooting 36.5% from the field and 30.4% from 3-point range. On December 19, 2023, he scored 18 points, while also setting a school record with ten steals in a game in a win over Troy. On January 13, 2024, Murrell scored 26 points in a win over Vanderbilt. On February 17, 2024, Murrell put up 26 points in a 79-76 victory against Missouri. He finished the 2023-24 season, averaging 16.2 points, 3.6 rebounds, and 1.6 steals per game, while shooting 46.4% from three, where for his performance he was named second-team all-SEC. Heading into the 2024-25 season, he was named to the Jerry West Shooting Guard of the Year watchlist. On December 21, 2024, he tallied ten points, six rebounds, and three assists in a win over Queens. On January 25, 2025, Murrell totaled 12 points, six rebounds, and two assists against Missouri. On February 4, 2025, he hit six threes scoring 24 points in an upset win over #14 Kentucky. On March 5, 2025, he scored 12 points in an upset victory against Tennessee. Murrell finished the 2024-25 season appearing in 32 games, averaging 10.8 points, 3.5 rebounds, 1.8 assists, and 1.8 steals on 42.4% shooting from the field, where after the conclusion of the season he declared for the 2025 NBA draft.

== Professional career ==
For the 2025–26 season, Murrell signed with the Salt Lake City Stars of the NBA G League.

On August 31, 2026, Murrell signed an Exhibit 10 contract with the Utah Jazz. He was waived by the Jazz on September 2.
