= Cameron Matthews =

American basketball player (born 2001)

No. 9 – Rio Grande Valley Vipers
- Position: Small forward
- League: NBA G League

Personal information
- Born: December 23, 2001 (age 24) Olive Branch, Mississippi, U.S.
- Listed height: 6 ft 7 in (2.01 m)
- Listed weight: 235 lb (107 kg)

Career information
- High school: Olive Branch (Olive Branch, Mississippi)
- College: Mississippi State (2020–2025)
- NBA draft: 2025: undrafted
- Playing career: 2025–present

Career history
- 2025–present: Rio Grande Valley Vipers

Career highlights
- 2× SEC All-Defensive team (2024, 2025)
- Stats at NBA.com
- Stats at Basketball Reference

Cameron Matthews (born December 23, 2001) is an American professional basketball player for the Rio Grande Valley Vipers of the NBA G League. He played college basketball for the Mississippi State Bulldogs.

== Career ==
Matthews grew up in Olive Branch, Mississippi and attended Olive Branch High School. He chose to attend home state Mississippi State University.

Known for his defense, Matthews decided to utilize the extra year of eligibility granted to college athletes who played in the 2020–21 season due to the COVID-19 pandemic and returned to Mississippi State for a fifth season.

After going undrafted in the 2025 NBA draft, Matthews signed with the Houston Rockets as a free agent.
