= Auburn Tigers men's basketball statistical leaders =

The Auburn Tigers men's basketball statistical leaders are individual statistical leaders of the Auburn Tigers men's basketball program in various categories, including points, rebounds, assists, steals, and blocks. Within those areas, the lists identify single-game, single-season, and career leaders. The Tigers represent Auburn University in the NCAA's Southeastern Conference.

Auburn began competing in intercollegiate basketball in 1905. However, the school's record book does not generally list records from before the 1950s, as records from before this period are often incomplete and inconsistent. Since scoring was much lower in this era, and teams played much fewer games during a typical season, it is likely that few or no players from this era would appear on these lists anyway.

The NCAA did not officially record assists as a stat until the 1983–84 season, and blocks and steals until the 1985–86 season, but Auburn's record books includes players in these stats before these seasons. These lists are updated through the end of the 2020–21 season.

== Scoring ==
Career
Rk	Player	Points	Seasons
1	Chuck Person	2,311	1982–83 1983–84 1984–85 1985–86
2	Mike Mitchell	2,123	1974–75 1975–76 1976–77 1977–78
3	Wesley Person	2,066	1990–91 1991–92 1992–93 1993–94
4	Eddie Johnson	1,988	1973–74 1974–75 1975–76 1976–77
5	John Mengelt	1,920	1968–69 1969–70 1970–71
6	Ronnie Battle	1,916	1989–90 1990–91 1991–92 1992–93
7	Chris Morris	1,717	1984–85 1985–86 1986–87 1987–88
8	Johni Broome	1,712	2022–23 2023–24 2024–25
9	Bryce Brown	1,673	2015–16 2016–17 2017–18 2018–19
10	Frankie Sullivan	1,556	2008–09 2009–10 2010–11 2011–12 2012–13

Season
Rk	Player	Points	Season
1	Chuck Person	747	1984–85
2	John Mengelt	738	1970–71
3	Chuck Person	710	1985–86
4	John Mengelt	696	1969–70
5	Keyshawn Hall	694	2025–26
6	Mike Mitchell	671	1977–78
7	Johni Broome	669	2024–25
8	KT Harrell	648	2014–15
9	Bryce Brown	637	2018–19
10	Marquis Daniels	625	2002–03

Single game
Rk	Player	Points	Season	Opponent
1	John Mengelt	60	1969–70	Alabama
2	John Mengelt	48	1970–71	Vanderbilt
3	John Mengelt	47	1969–70	Ole Miss
4	John Mengelt	45	1970–71	N.C. State
5	Wesley Person	44	1993–94	UAB
	Keenan Carpenter	44	1988–89	LSU
7	Ronnie Battle	43	1991–92	Georgia
8	John Mengelt	42	1968–69	Kentucky
9	John Mengelt	41	1969–70	Kentucky
10	Chuck Person	40	1985–86	Vanderbilt
	Mike Mitchell	40	1976–77	Georgia
	John Mengelt	40	1970–71	Georgia
	John Mengelt	40	1969–70	Vanderbilt

== Rebounds ==
Career
Rk	Player	Rebounds	Seasons
1	Mike Mitchell	996	1974–75 1975–76 1976–77 1977–78
2	Johni Broome	965	2022–23 2023–24 2024–25
3	Jeff Moore	950	1984–85 1985–86 1986–87 1987–88
4	Chuck Person	940	1982–83 1983–84 1984–85 1985–86
5	Gary Redding	936	1972–73 1973–74 1974–75 1975–76
6	Rex Frederick	904	1956–57 1957–58 1958–59
7	Chris Morris	860	1984–85 1985–86 1986–87 1987–88
8	Charles Barkley	806	1981–82 1982–83 1983–84
9	Mamadou N'diaye	798	1996–97 1997–98 1998–99 1999–00
10	Korvotney Barber	762	2005–06 2006–07 2007–08 2008–09

Season
Rk	Player	Rebounds	Season
1	Johni Broome	389	2024–25
2	Korvotney Barber	347	2008–09
3	Cinmeon Bowers	326	2014–15
4	Rex Frederick	325	1957–58
5	Rex Frederick	322	1956–57
6	Bill Alexander	316	1969–70
7	Freddie Guy	306	1964–65
8	Chuck Person	303	1984–85
9	Pepto Bolden	302	1973–74
10	Johni Broome	299	2023–24

Single game
Rk	Player	Rebounds	Season	Opponent
1	Rex Frederick	27	1957–58	SMU
2	Rex Frederick	25	1957–58	Ole Miss
3	Rex Frederick	24	1956–57	Howard
	Bob Miller	24	1952–53	Florida
5	Mike Mitchell	23	1974–75	Mississippi St.
6	Bill Alexander	22	1969–70	Dartmouth
	Al Leapheart	22	1969–70	Alabama
	Freddie Guy	22	1964–65	Furman
	Rex Frederick	22	1958–59	Alabama
	Dan Pridgen	22	1950–51	Mississippi St.

== Assists ==
Career
Rk	Player	Assists	Seasons
1	Gerald White	624	1983–84 1984–85 1985–86 1986–87
2	Wes Flanigan	573	1993–94 1994–95 1995–96 1996–97
3	Doc Robinson	568	1996–97 1997–98 1998–99 1999–00
4	Quantez Robertson	529	2005–06 2006–07 2007–08 2008–09
5	Jared Harper	511	2016–17 2017–18 2018–19
6	Eddie Johnson	499	1973–74 1974–75 1975–76 1976–77
7	DeWayne Reed	477	2006–07 2007–08 2008–09 2009–10
8	Reggie Gallon	466	1989–90 1990–91 1991–92 1992–93
9	Paul Daniels	460	1980–81 1981–82 1982–83 1983–84
10	Stan Pietkiewicz	356	1974–75 1975–76 1976–77 1977–78

Season
Rk	Player	Assists	Season
1	Jared Harper	231	2018–19
2	Gerald White	221	1985–86
3	Wes Flanigan	214	1995–96
4	Jamison Brewer	187	2000–01
5	Gerald White	185	1984–85
	Jared Harper	185	2017–18
7	Doc Robinson	175	1999–00
8	Wendell Green Jr.	172	2021–22
9	Doc Robinson	166	1998–99
10	Quantez Robertson	163	2006–07

Single game
Rk	Player	Assists	Season	Opponent
1	J'Von McCormick	16	2019–20	CSU Northridge
2	Eddie Johnson	15	1975–76	LSU
3	Jared Harper	14	2017–18	Vanderbilt
	Sharife Cooper	14	2020–21	Ole Miss

== Steals ==
Career
Rk	Player	Steals	Seasons
1	Quantez Robertson	210	2005–06 2006–07 2007–08 2008–09
	DeWayne Reed	210	2006–07 2007–08 2008–09 2009–10
3	Marquis Daniels	208	1999–00 2000–01 2001–02 2002–03
4	Frankie Sullivan	190	2008–09 2009–10 2010–11 2011–12 2012–13
5	Chris Morris	189	1984–85 1985–86 1986–87 1987–88
6	Bryant Smith	186	1995–96 1996–97 1997–98 1998–99
7	Reggie Gallon	177	1989–90 1990–91 1991–92 1992–93
8	Gerald White	164	1983–84 1984–85 1985–86 1986–87
9	Frank Ford	156	1983–84 1984–85 1985–86 1986–87

Season
Rk	Player	Steals	Season
1	Marquis Daniels	78	2002–03
2	Marquis Daniels	71	2000–01
3	Chuma Okeke	69	2018–19
4	Bryant Smith	67	1997–98
	DeWayne Reed	67	2008–09
6	Wes Flanigan	64	1995–96
	Chris Porter	64	1998–99
	Derrick Dennison	64	1989–90
	K. D. Johnson	64	2021–22
10	Quantez Robertson	63	2007–08

Single game
Rk	Player	Steals	Season	Opponent
1	Derrick Dennison	8	1989–90	Michigan State
	DeWayne Reed	8	2007–08	George Washington

== Blocks ==
Career
Rk	Player	Blocks	Seasons
1	Kyle Davis	360	2000–01 2001–02 2002–03 2003–04
2	Mamadou N'diaye	241	1996–97 1997–98 1998–99 1999–00
3	Johni Broome	232	2022–23 2023–24 2024–25
4	Dylan Cardwell	211	2020–21 2021–22 2022–23 2023–24 2024–25
5	Anfernee McLemore	187	2016–17 2017–18 2018–19 2019–20
6	Horace Spencer	170	2015–16 2016–17 2017–18 2018–19
7	Korvotney Barber	155	2005–06 2006–07 2007–08 2008–09
	Walker Kessler	155	2021–22
9	Charles Barkley	145	1981–82 1982–83 1983–84
10	Chris Morris	141	1984–85 1985–86 1986–87 1987–88

Season
Rk	Player	Blocks	Season
1	Walker Kessler	155	2021–22
2	Kyle Davis	126	2002–03
3	Kyle Davis	84	2000–01
4	Kyle Davis	78	2001–02
	Johni Broome	78	2022–23
	Johni Broome	78	2023–24
7	Mamadou N'diaye	77	1998–99
8	Johni Broome	76	2024–25
9	Mamadou N'diaye	73	1997–98
	Anfernee McLemore	73	2017–18

Single game
Rk	Player	Steals	Season	Opponent
1	Kyle Davis	13	2000–01	Miami
