= Pete Newell Big Man Award =

American basketball award

- Awarded for: the nation's best low-post player in NCAA Division I men's basketball
- Country: United States
- Presented by: NABC

History
- First award: 2000
- Most recent: Cameron Boozer, Duke
- Website: Official website

The Pete Newell Big Man Award has been awarded by the National Association of Basketball Coaches (NABC) since 2000. It is presented to the best low-post player each season. The award is named after Pete Newell, the coach who ran the Pete Newell Big Man Camp for low-post players from 1976 until his death in 2008. Newell coached for 15 years at San Francisco, Michigan State, and California, compiling an overall record of 234 wins and 123 losses, including NIT and NCAA championships in 1949 and 1959, respectively.

== Key ==
*	Awarded a national player of the year award that same season: Sporting News; Oscar Robertson Trophy; Associated Press; NABC; Naismith; Wooden
Player (X)	Denotes the number of times the player has been awarded the Pete Newell Big Man Award at that point

== Winners ==
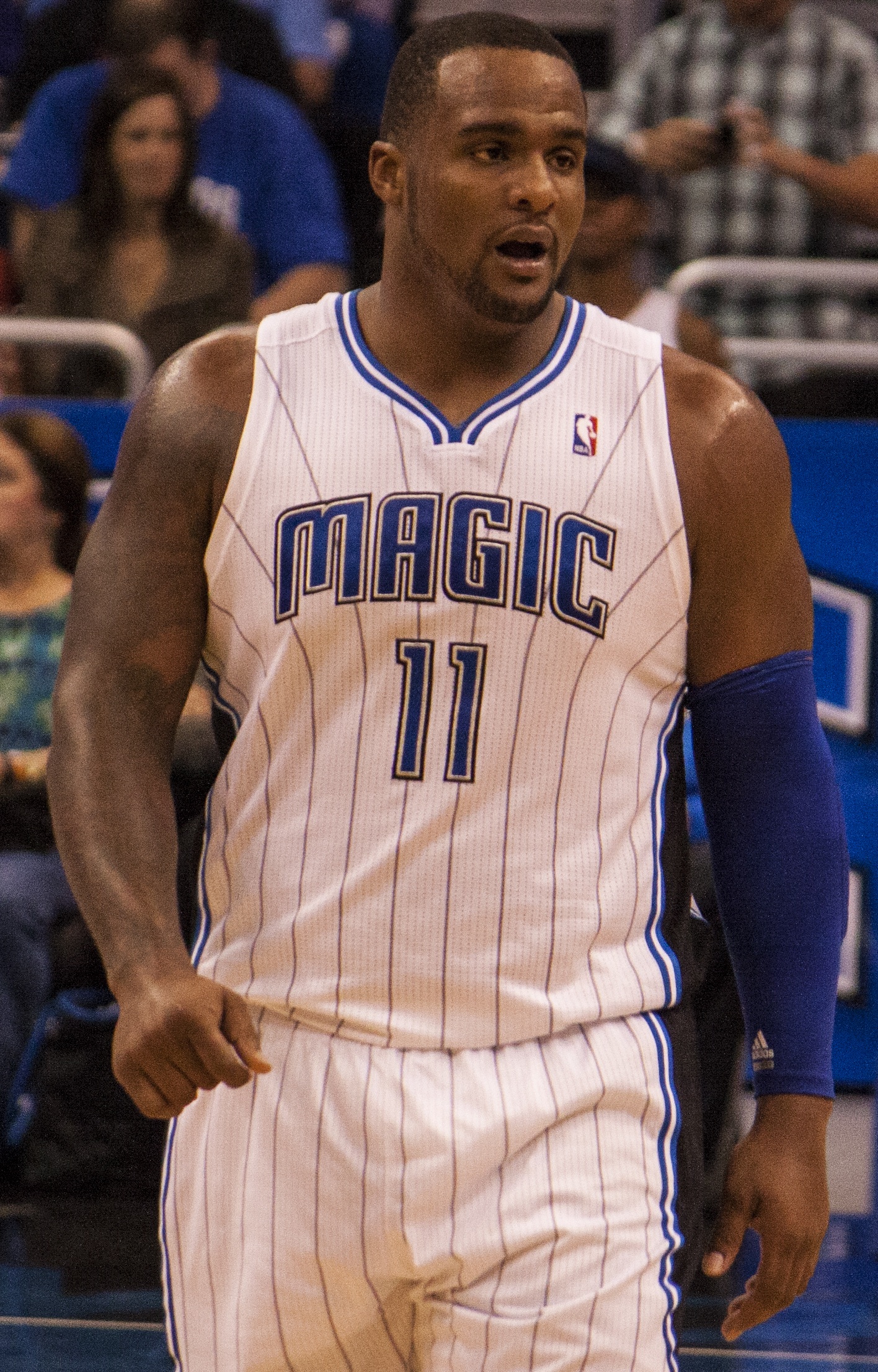
Glen Davis, LSU, 2006

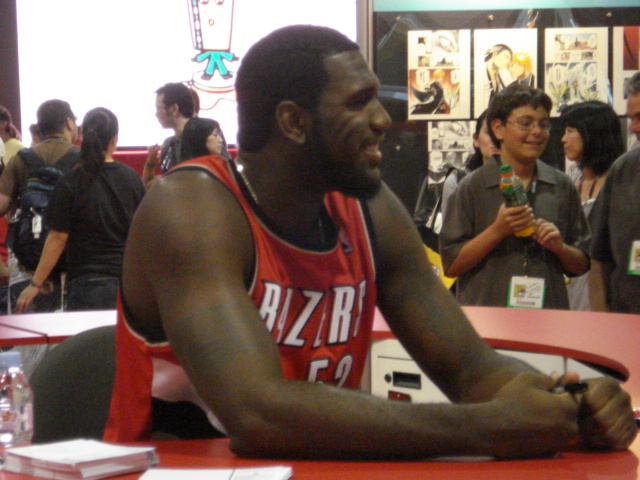
Greg Oden, Ohio State, 2007

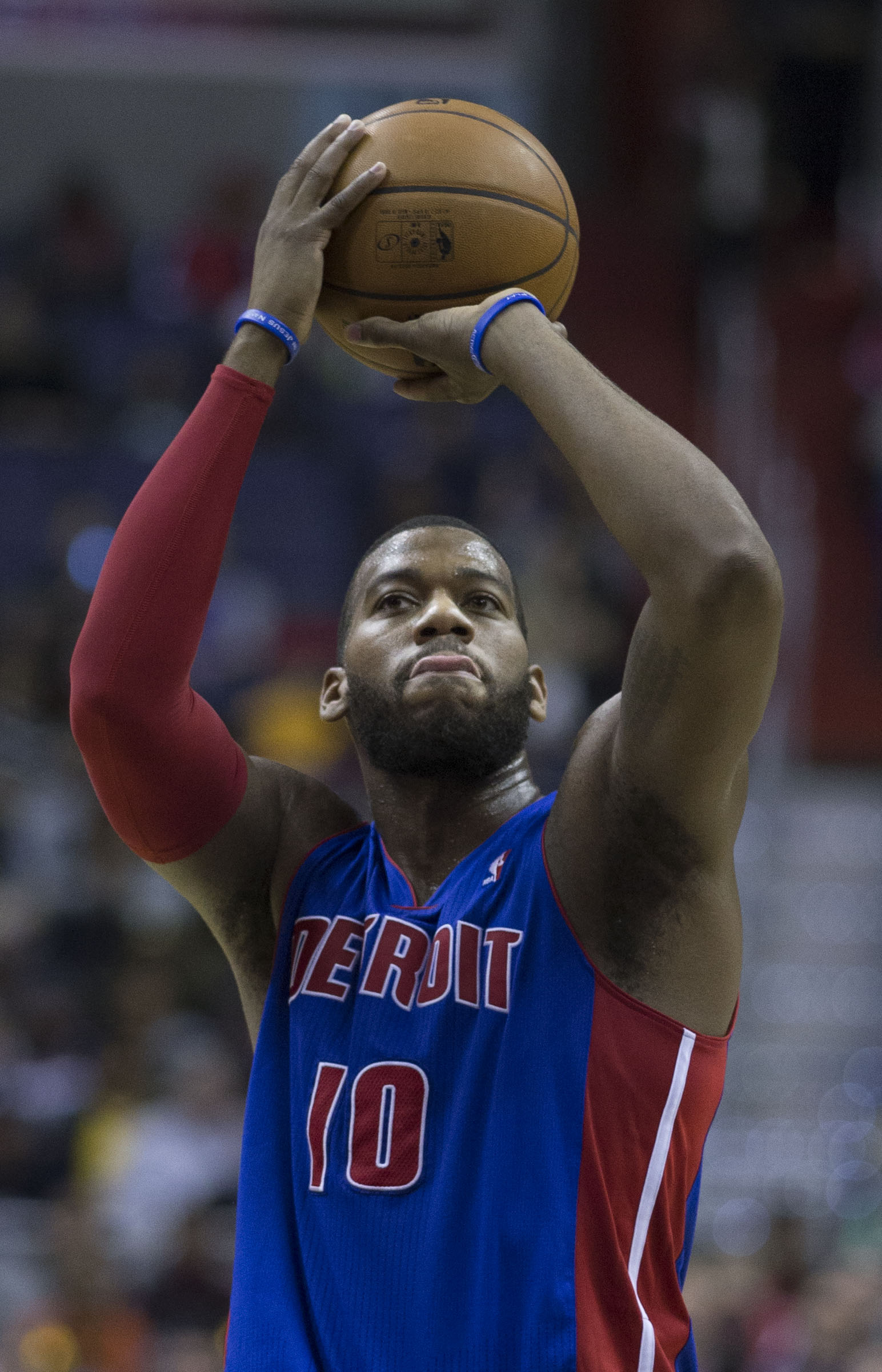
Greg Monroe, Georgetown, 2010

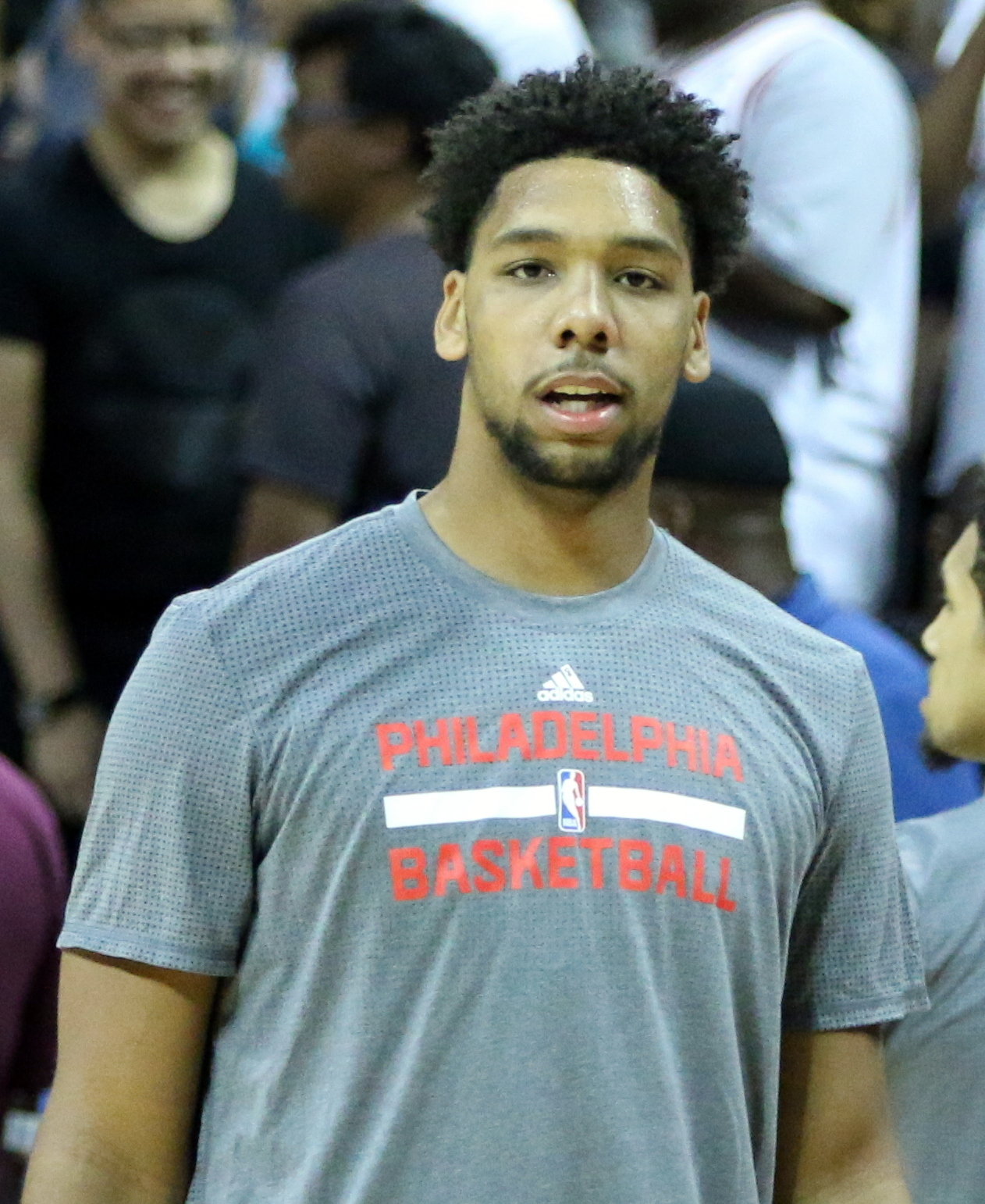
Jahlil Okafor, Duke, 2015

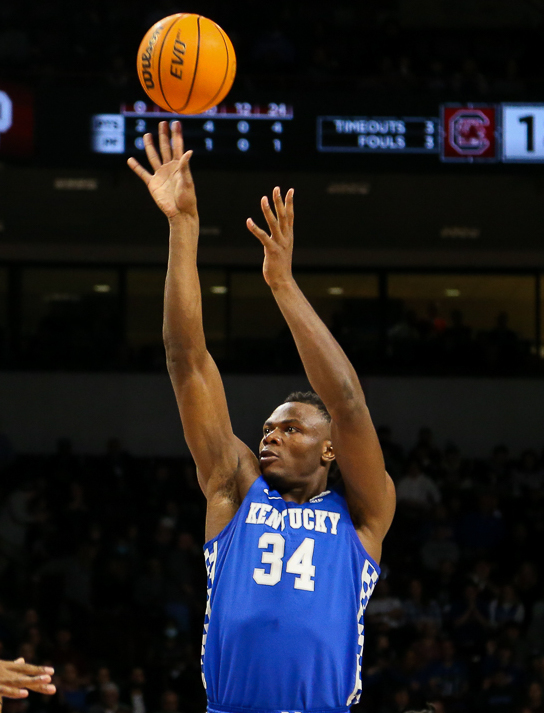
Oscar Tshiebwe, Kentucky, 2012

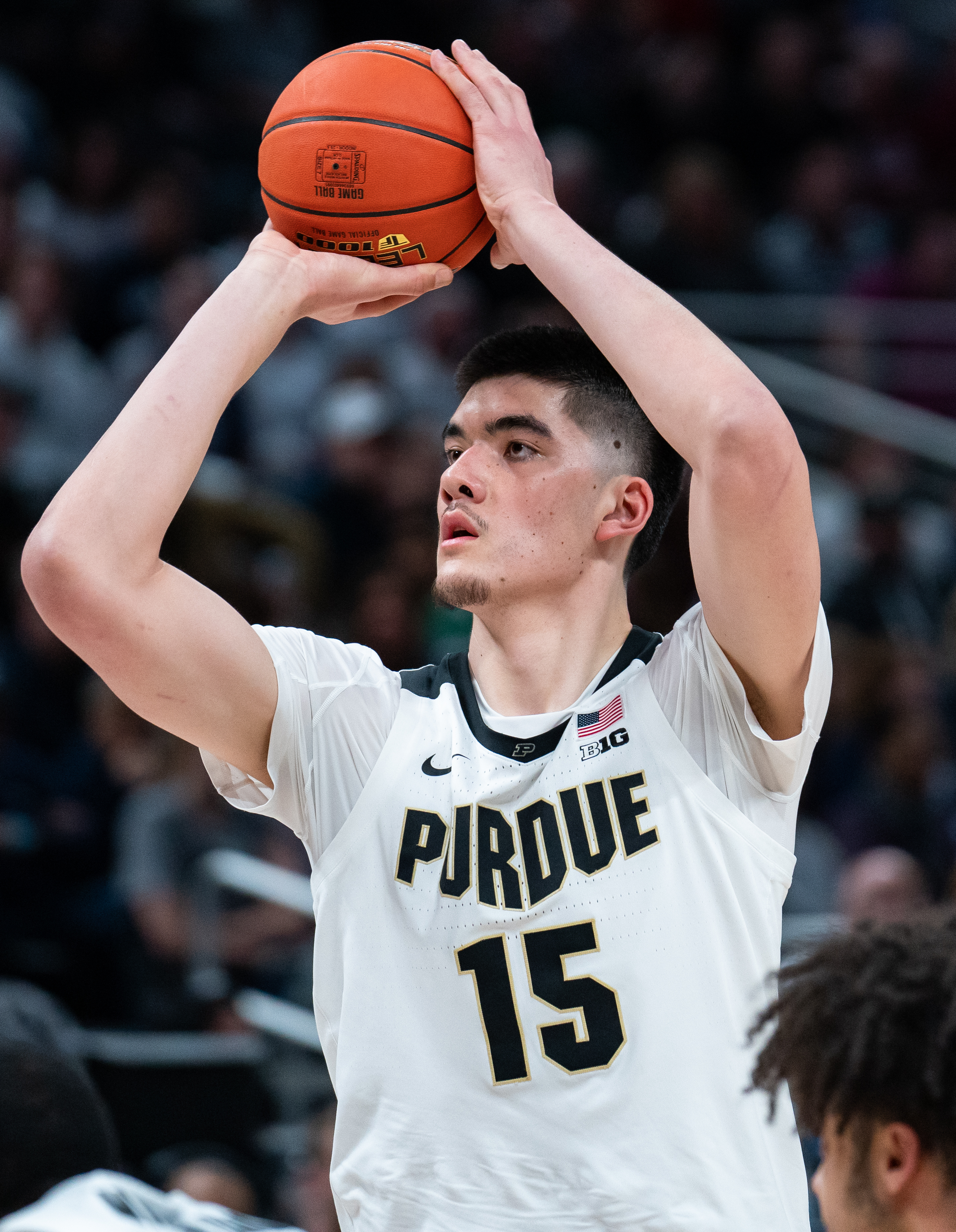
Zach Edey, Purdue, 2023 and 2024

Season	Player	School	Position	Class	Reference
1999–00	Marcus Fizer	Iowa State	PF	Junior	
2000–01	Jason Collins	Stanford	C	Senior	
2001–02	Drew Gooden*	Kansas	C	Junior	
2002–03	David West*	Xavier	PF	Senior	
2003–04	Emeka Okafor*	UConn	C	Junior	
2004–05	Andrew Bogut*	Utah	C	Sophomore	
2005–06	Glen Davis	LSU	C	Sophomore	
2006–07	Greg Oden	Ohio State	C	Freshman	
2007–08	Michael Beasley	Kansas State	PF	Freshman	
2008–09	Blake Griffin*	Oklahoma	PF	Sophomore	
2009–10	Greg Monroe	Georgetown	PF / C	Sophomore	
2010–11	JaJuan Johnson	Purdue	C	Senior	
2011–12	Anthony Davis*	Kentucky	C	Freshman	
2012–13	Mason Plumlee	Duke	PF / C	Senior	
2013–14	Patric Young	Florida	C	Senior	
2014–15	Jahlil Okafor	Duke	C	Freshman	
2015–16	Jakob Pöltl	Utah	C	Sophomore	
2016–17	Caleb Swanigan	Purdue	PF / C	Sophomore	
2017–18	Marvin Bagley III	Duke	PF / C	Freshman	
2018–19	Ethan Happ	Wisconsin	C	Senior	
2019–20	Luka Garza*	Iowa	C	Junior	
2020–21	Luka Garza* (2)	Iowa	C	Senior	
2021–22	Oscar Tshiebwe*	Kentucky	C	Junior	
2022–23	Zach Edey*	Purdue	C	Junior	
2023–24	Zach Edey* (2)	Purdue	C	Senior	
2024–25	Johni Broome*	Auburn	PF / C	Senior	
2025–26	Cameron Boozer*	Duke	PF	Freshman	
