= Karl Malone Award =

American college basketball award

- Awarded for: The nation's top male power forward in NCAA basketball
- Country: United States
- Presented by: Naismith Memorial Basketball Hall of Fame

History
- First award: 2015
- Most recent: Cameron Boozer, Duke
- Website: Official website

The Karl Malone Power Forward of the Year Award is an annual basketball award given by the Naismith Memorial Basketball Hall of Fame to the top men's collegiate power forward. Following the success of the Bob Cousy Award which had been awarded since 2004, the award was one of four new awards (along with the Jerry West Award, Julius Erving Award, and Kareem Abdul-Jabbar Award) created as part of the inaugural College Basketball Awards show in 2015. It is named after Karl Malone, a Naismith Memorial Basketball Hall of Fame inductee who played the position. The inaugural winner was Montrezl Harrell of Louisville.

== Key ==
*	Awarded a national player of the year award that same season: Sporting News; Oscar Robertson Trophy; Associated Press; NABC; Naismith; Wooden
Player (X)	Denotes the number of times the player has been awarded the Karl Malone Award at that point

== Winners ==
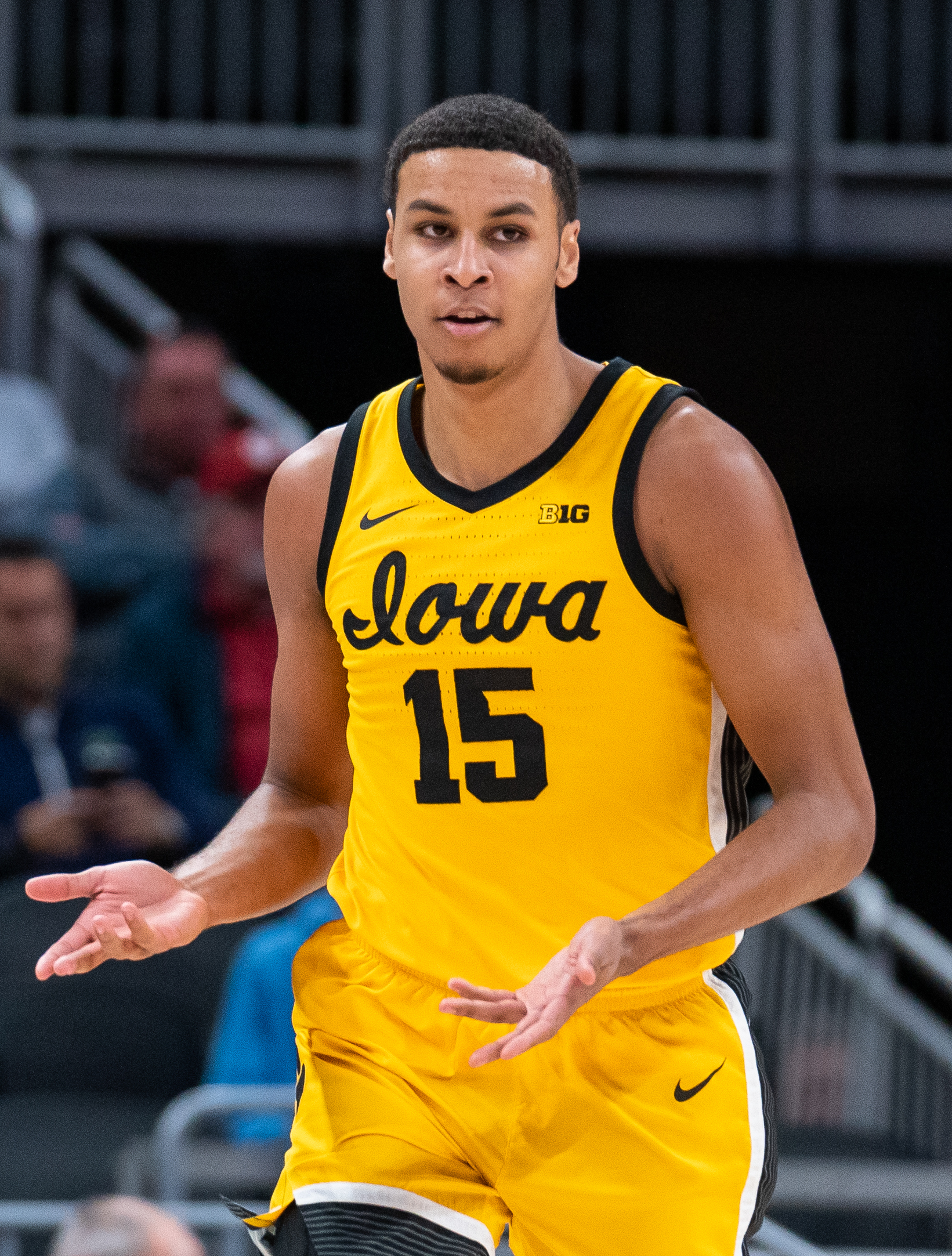
Keegan Murray, Iowa, 2022

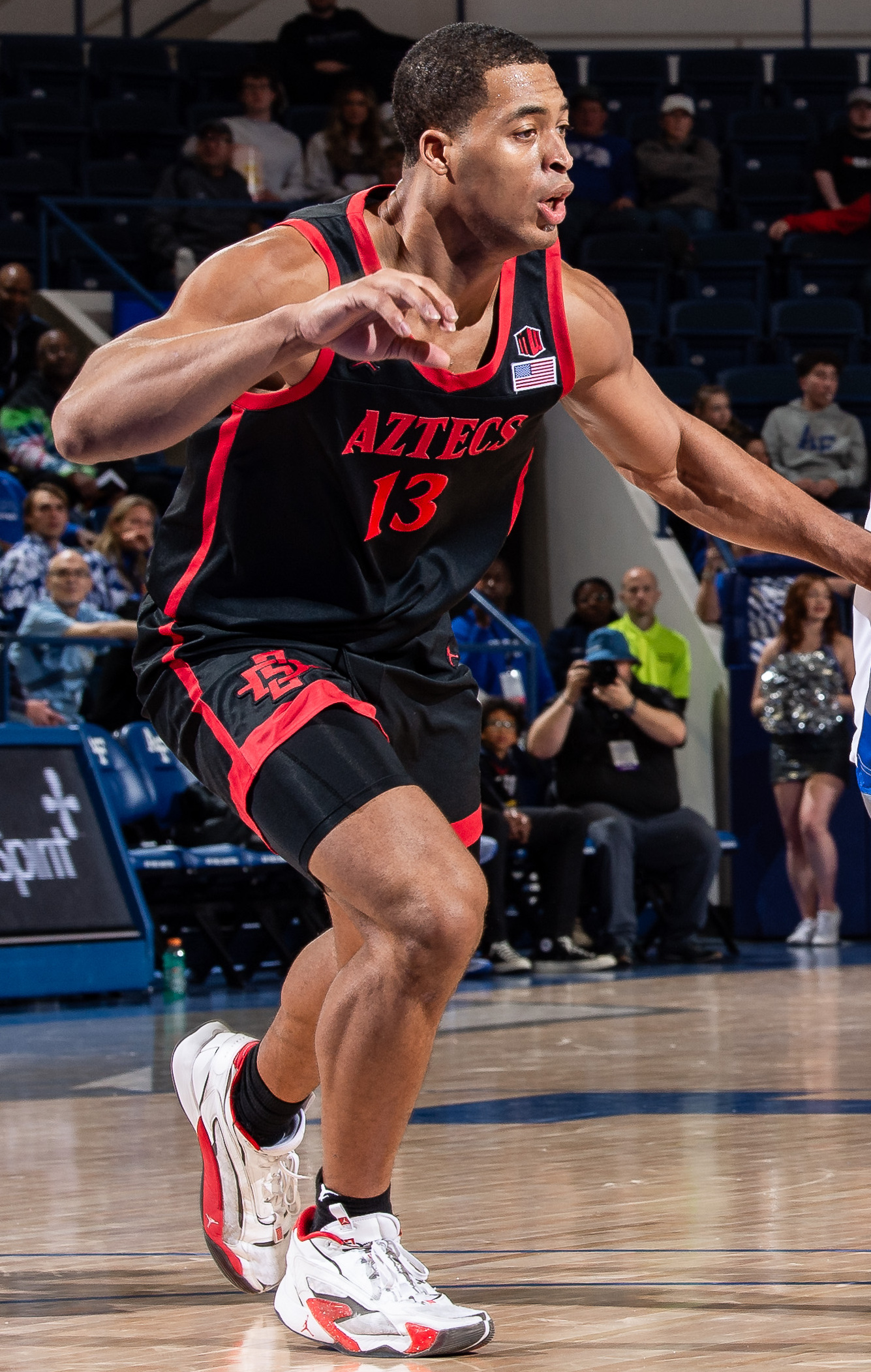
Jaedon LeDee, San Diego State, 2024

Season	Player	School	Class	Reference
2014–15	Montrezl Harrell	Louisville	Junior	
2015–16	Georges Niang	Iowa State	Senior	
2016–17	Johnathan Motley	Baylor	Junior	
2017–18	Deandre Ayton	Arizona	Freshman	
2018–19	Zion Williamson*	Duke	Freshman	
2019–20	Obi Toppin*	Dayton	Sophomore	
2020–21	Drew Timme	Gonzaga	Sophomore	
2021–22	Keegan Murray	Iowa	Sophomore	
2022–23	Trayce Jackson-Davis	Indiana	Senior	
2023–24	Jaedon LeDee	San Diego State	Graduate	
2024–25	Johni Broome*	Auburn	Senior	
2025–26	Cameron Boozer*	Duke	Freshman	
