= Johni Broome =

American basketball player (born 2002)

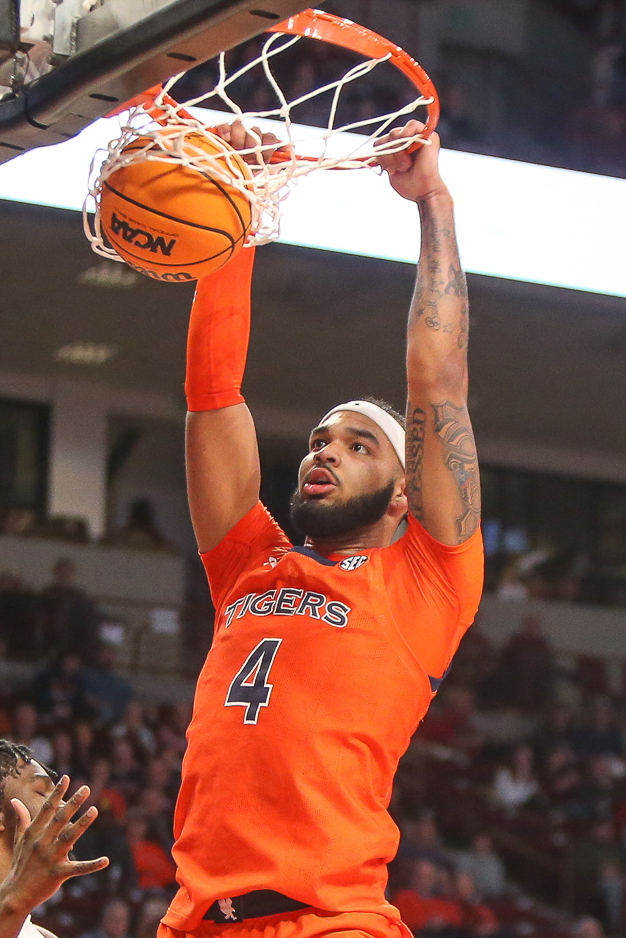
- Broome with Auburn in 2023

No. 12 – Minnesota Timberwolves
- Position: Center
- League: NBA

Personal information
- Born: July 19, 2002 (age 24) Plant City, Florida, U.S.
- Listed height: 6 ft 10 in (2.08 m)
- Listed weight: 244 lb (111 kg)

Career information
- High school: Plant City (Plant City, Florida); Tampa Catholic (Tampa, Florida)
- College: Morehead State (2020–2022); Auburn (2022–2025)
- NBA draft: 2025: 2nd round, 35th overall pick
- Drafted by: Philadelphia 76ers
- Playing career: 2025–present

Career history
- 2025–2026: Philadelphia 76ers
- 2025–2026: →Delaware Blue Coats
- 2026: Wisconsin Herd
- 2026–present: Minnesota Timberwolves
- 2026–present: →Iowa Wolves

Career highlights
- The Sporting News Player of the Year (2025); Consensus first-team All-American (2025); Third-team All-American – AP, USBWA, NABC, SN (2024); Pete Newell Big Man Award (2025); Karl Malone Award (2025); SEC Player of the Year (2025); 2× First-team All-SEC (2024, 2025); Second-team All-SEC (2023); SEC All-Defensive Team (2024); SEC Tournament MVP (2024); 2× First-team All-OVC (2021, 2022); OVC Defensive Player of the Year (2022); OVC Freshman of the Year (2021); OVC All-Newcomer Team (2021); OVC Tournament MVP (2021)
- Stats at NBA.com
- Stats at Basketball Reference

Johni Broome (JUH-nye; born July 19, 2002) is an American professional basketball player for the Minnesota Timberwolves of the National Basketball Association (NBA), on a two-way contract with the Iowa Wolves of the NBA G League. He played college basketball for the Morehead State Eagles and Auburn Tigers.

== High school career ==
Broome attended Plant City High School in Plant City, Florida, and grew about six inches (15 cm) in two years. He transferred to Tampa Catholic High School in Tampa, Florida. As a senior, Broome averaged 19.6 points, 10.9 rebounds, and 2.2 blocks per game, and was named Hillsborough County Player of the Year. He committed to playing college basketball for Morehead State over offers from Florida Atlantic, Georgia Southern, Jacksonville, and Bryant.

== College career ==
Broome immediately assumed an important role at Morehead State after Tyzhun Claude suffered a torn anterior cruciate ligament during practice before the season. At the conclusion of the regular season, he was named Ohio Valley Conference (OVC) Player of the Year and earned First Team All-OVC honors. He was a nine-time OVC Freshman of the Week, breaking the program record previously held by Kenneth Faried, who earned the accolade eight times. On March 6, 2021, Broome posted 27 points and 12 rebounds in an 86–71 win over top-seeded Belmont at the OVC tournament final. He was named tournament MVP. Broome averaged 13.8 points, nine rebounds, and 1.9 blocks per game as a freshman.

He averaged 16.8 points, 10.5 rebounds, and 3.9 blocks per game as a sophomore. As a sophomore, Broome was again named to the First Team All-OVC, as well as Defensive Player of the Year. On April 4, 2022, Broome entered the transfer portal. On April 30, 2022, Broome announced that he would be transferring to Auburn over Florida.

In the 2024–25 season, Broome helped Auburn secure a top seed in the NCAA Division I tournament by leading the Tigers in points, rebounds, assists, and blocks. He was named The Sporting News Men's College Basketball Player of the Year.

In his final season at Auburn, Broome scored 669 points and had 389 rebounds which ranks 7th and 1st, respectively, for Auburn Tigers men's basketball statistical leaders. He scored 1,245 points over his final two seasons, which broke the two-year scoring record previously held by KT Harrell (1,196). His total points rank 8th (1,712), career scoring average ranks 10th (16.5), career rebounding average ranks 6th (9.3), total rebounds rank 2nd (965) and total blocks rank 3rd all time (232).

== Professional career ==
=== Philadelphia 76ers (2025–2026) ===
Broome was selected by the Philadelphia 76ers with the 35th pick in the 2025 NBA Draft. In his pre-season debut against the New York Knicks in Abu Dhabi, Broome scored four points and had six rebounds. On January 16, 2026, while playing for the Delaware Blue Coats, Broome recorded 50 points and 17 rebounds in a 155–140 victory over the College Park Skyhawks. On February 22, Broome was ruled out indefinitely after being diagnosed with a lateral meniscus tear in his right knee. On May 4, Broome made his NBA playoffs debut, where he played five minutes in game one against the New York Knicks, in that game, he tallied up just one rebound while going 0-1 from the field. On May 10, he played three minutes for the 76ers, scoring seven points and tallying one rebound and one assist. He went 3-for-5 from the field goal and 1-for-3 from the three-point line.

On July 28, 2026, Broome was traded to the Los Angeles Clippers to free up a roster spot for Kentavious Caldwell-Pope.. But on September 24, 2026, Broome was waived by the Clippers.

== Career statistics ==
Legend
| GP | Games played | GS | Games started | MPG | Minutes per game |
| FG% | Field goal percentage | 3P% | 3-point field goal percentage | FT% | Free throw percentage |
| RPG | Rebounds per game | APG | Assists per game | SPG | Steals per game |
| BPG | Blocks per game | PPG | Points per game | **Bold** | Career high |

=== NBA ===
==== Regular season ====
| Year | Team | GP | GS | MPG | FG% | 3P% | FT% | RPG | APG | SPG | BPG | PPG |
|---|---|---|---|---|---|---|---|---|---|---|---|---|
| 2025–26 | Philadelphia | 11 | 0 | 5.0 | .167 | .000 | .333 | 1.5 | .4 | .3 | .2 | .9 |
| Career | | 11 | 0 | 5.0 | .167 | .000 | .333 | 1.5 | .4 | .3 | .2 | .9 |

==== Playoffs ====
| Year | Team | GP | GS | MPG | FG% | 3P% | FT% | RPG | APG | SPG | BPG | PPG |
|---|---|---|---|---|---|---|---|---|---|---|---|---|
| 2026 | Philadelphia | 2 | 0 | 4.0 | .500 | .250 | — | 1.0 | .5 | .0 | .0 | 3.5 |
| Career | | 2 | 0 | 4.0 | .500 | .250 | — | 1.0 | .5 | .0 | .0 | 3.5 |

=== College ===
| Year | Team | GP | GS | MPG | FG% | 3P% | FT% | RPG | APG | SPG | BPG | PPG |
|---|---|---|---|---|---|---|---|---|---|---|---|---|
| 2020–21 | Morehead State | 30 | 27 | 25.8 | **.571** | — | .618 | 9.0 | .7 | .6 | 1.9 | 13.8 |
| 2021–22 | Morehead State | 34 | 34 | 28.3 | .555 | .000 | **.636** | 10.5 | 1.2 | .7 | **3.9** | 16.8 |
| 2022–23 | Auburn | 33 | 33 | 26.5 | .527 | .290 | .560 | 8.4 | 1.3 | **.9** | 2.4 | 14.2 |
| 2023–24 | Auburn | 35 | 34 | 24.8 | .548 | **.354** | .615 | 8.5 | 2.2 | **.9** | 2.2 | 16.5 |
| 2024–25 | Auburn | **36** | **35** | **30.2** | .510 | .278 | .587 | **10.8** | **2.9** | **.9** | 2.1 | **18.6** |
| Career | | 168 | 163 | 27.2 | .539 | .302 | .603 | 9.5 | 1.7 | .8 | 2.5 | 16.1 |

== Personal life ==
Broome is a Christian. Broome's older brother, John Jr., played college football for FIU. His favorite NBA player is James Harden.

== See also ==
- List of NCAA Division I men's basketball players with 2,000 points and 1,000 rebounds
- List of NCAA Division I men's basketball career rebounding leaders
- List of NCAA Division I men's basketball career blocks leaders
- List of NCAA Division I men's basketball career games played leaders
