= KT Harrell =

American basketball player and coach (born 1992)

Current position
- Title: Assistant coach
- Team: Michigan
- Conference: Big Ten

Biographical details
- Born: July 5, 1992 (age 34); Wiesbaden, Germany

Playing career
- 2010–2012: Virginia
- 2013–2015: Auburn
- 2015–2016: Akhisar
- 2016–2017: Siena
- 2017–2018: Brussels
- 2018–2019: Biella
- Position: Shooting guard

Coaching career (HC unless noted)
- 2020–2022: Auburn (graduate assistant)
- 2022–2024: Florida Atlantic (director of operations)
- 2024–2026: Michigan (director of operations)
- 2026–present: Michigan (assistant)

Accomplishments and honors

Championships
- As administrative assistant: NCAA Division I tournament (2026)

Awards
- As player: Second-team All-SEC (2015); Alabama Gatorade Player of the Year (2010)

Keylon Tobias Harrell (born July 5, 1992) is an American college basketball coach, currently an assistant coach at the University of Michigan. He played college basketball for the Virginia Cavaliers and Auburn Tigers. Harrell led the Southeastern Conference (SEC) in scoring in 2015 and is sixth all-time in career scoring average at Auburn with 18.4 points per game. He broke the school's two-year scoring record with 1,196 points, which was surpassed by Johni Broome in 2025. Harrell also played professionally in Turkey, Italy and Belgium.

== Early life ==
Harrell was born on July 5, 1992 in Wiesbaden, Germany, the son of military parents Michele and Rodney Harrell. He moved to Montgomery, Alabama at five years old and attended Brew Tech High School. As a senior, Harrell won 2010 Gatorade Player of the Year for Alabama, joining former state winners: Jordan Swing, JaMychal Green and Justin Knox. He was also named the Class 4A Player of the Year by the Alabama Sports Writers Association and he was an Alabama-Mississippi All-Star Classic selection. Additionally, Harrell was an ESPN RISE Southeast Region Boys Basketball Player of the Week honoree. He led his high school team to a 23–6 record and to the Class 4A state championship game, averaging 27.8 points, 10.8 rebounds, 6.3 assists, 2.8 steals and 1.6 blocks per game. Harrell had a 3.02 academic GPA at Brew Tech and was a member of the Fellowship of Christian Athletes, where he established a local bible study group and donated his time as a youth basketball instructor.

== Career statistics ==
Legend
GP	Games played	GS	Games started	MPG	Minutes per game
FG%	Field goal percentage	3P%	3-point field goal percentage	FT%	Free throw percentage
RPG	Rebounds per game	APG	Assists per game	SPG	Steals per game
BPG	Blocks per game	PPG	Points per game	**Bold**	Career high

=== NCAA ===
Year	Team	GP	GS	MPG	FG%	3P%	FT%	RPG	APG	SPG	BPG	PPG
2010–11	Virginia	31	15	22.2	.423	.421	.642	2.1	0.8	0.3	0.1	8.0
2011–12	Virginia	11	5	18.9	.315	.190	.700	1.0	0.9	0.5	0.4	4.7
2012–13	Auburn	Did not play (transfer redshirt)										
2013–14	Auburn	30	30	32.6	.433	.359	.870	4.0	2.1	0.8	0.2	18.3
2014–15	Auburn	35	35	33.0	.453	.434	.814	3.0	1.5	0.9	0.1	18.5
**Career**		**107**	**85**	**28.3**	**.433**	**.393**	**.802**	**2.8**	**1.4**	**0.7**	**0.1**	**14.0**

=== Professional ===
Year	Team	GP	GS	MPG	FG%	3P%	FT%	RPG	APG	SPG	BPG	PPG
2015–16	Akhisar	32	—	33.7	—	.358	.786	3.5	2.5	0.9	0.2	16.6
2016–17	Siena	30	—	35.5	—	.305	.839	3.1	3.6	0.6	0.3	19.3
2017–18	Brussels	37	—	25.2	—	.288	.750	2.2	1.8	0.9	0.1	10.2
2017–18 €	Brussels	6	—	24.7	—	.421	.842	2.3	1.3	0.7	0.2	12.7
2017–18 +	Brussels	2	—	29.0	—	.333	1.000	0.0	1.0	0.5	0.0	12.0
2018–19	Biella	35	—	32.1	—	.337	.895	2.9	2.2	0.5	0.1	16.2
**Career**

€ denotes FIBA Europe Cup
+ denotes FIBA Champions League

== See also ==
- Auburn Tigers men's basketball statistical leaders
