= Rex Frederick =

American basketball player-coach (born 1936)

Rex Frederick (born December 16, 1936, in Hamilton, Alabama ) is a retired American collegiate basketball player and coach. In high school he and his brother Max Frederick were star athletes who led Corner High School in Jefferson County to the Alabama state championship. He was an all-star player at Auburn University and is a member of Auburn's Basketball Hall of Fame.

Frederick left Auburn as the all-time leading rebounder and ninth all-time leading scorer with 937 points. Frederick remains the school's all-time leader in total rebounds per game with 15.3 average during the 1956-57 season. He also continues to hold the top two single-season records for most rebounds, with 325 in 1957–1958 and 322 in 1956–1957, and holds the single-game record for rebounds with 27 vs. SMU in 1957. His 904 career rebounds currently ranks fifth on the Tigers' all-time rebounding chart. In 2006, he became only the third Tiger to have his jersey (#32) retired.

After graduating from Auburn, Frederick served as assistant basketball coach at the University of Georgia from 1962-1966. Frederick joined University of South Alabama Jaguars staff in 1966 to create their men's basketball program. Once the program was launched in 1968, Frederick served for two seasons as the team's founding head coach.

Frederick currently resides in Auburn, AL.

== College career ==
Frederick played collegiately at Auburn University (1956–1959), helping the freshman team to an undefeated season. As a junior, he set Auburn's single-season record with 325 rebounds and also set the school's single game rebounding mark with 27. Frederick was chosen All-SEC two consecutive years (1958, 1959). His senior year he was named the 1959 SEC Defensive Player of the Year. The same year he was voted to the Associated Press and Helms All-America teams. Frederick's career scoring totaled 937 points and averaged 14.9 points a game. He graduated ranked as Auburn's third best rebounder, with 904 total rebounds and an average of 14.3 rebounds per game. While at Auburn, Frederick was also an All-SEC baseball player and helped lead the team to an SEC Championship.

== Coaching career ==
Frederick joined the University of Georgia men's basketball staff in 1962 and served four years as assistant coach.

In 1966, Frederick was hired to help plan and organize the inaugural men's basketball program at the newly-established University of South Alabama. The program was launched in 1968; Frederick served as head coach for the first two seasons, compiling a 19–29 (.396) record.

== Awards ==
- 1957 All-SEC
- 1958 All-SEC
- 1958 Team Captain
- 1959 All-SEC
- 1959 Team Captain
- 1959 Associated Press All-American
- 1959 Helms All-American
- 1959 SEC Defensive Player of the Year
- 2003 Inductee Alabama Sports Hall of Fame
- Auburn University All-Century Team
- Member of Auburn's Basketball Hall of Fame
- Inducted into the Tiger Trail of Auburn by the Chamber of Commerce
