= The Sporting News Men's College Basketball Player of the Year =

US college basketball award

- Awarded for: the most outstanding NCAA Division I men's basketball player
- Country: United States
- Presented by: The Sporting News magazine

History
- First award: 1943
- Most recent: Cameron Boozer, Duke

The Sporting News Men's College Basketball Player of the Year is an annual college basketball award given to the best men's basketball player in NCAA Division I competition. The award was first given following the 1942–43 season and is presented by The Sporting News (known from 2002–2022 as Sporting News), an American–based sports magazine established in 1886.

No award winners were selected from 1947 to 1949 and from 1952 to 1957. Repeat winners of The Sporting News Player of the Year award are rare. As of 2025, it has occurred only eight times. Of those eight repeat winners, only Oscar Robertson of Cincinnati and Bill Walton of UCLA have been named the player of the year three times.

Duke have the most all-time awards with eight. UCLA has the second-most awards with seven.

== Key ==
Player (X)	Denotes the number of times the player has been awarded the player of the year award at that point

== Winners ==
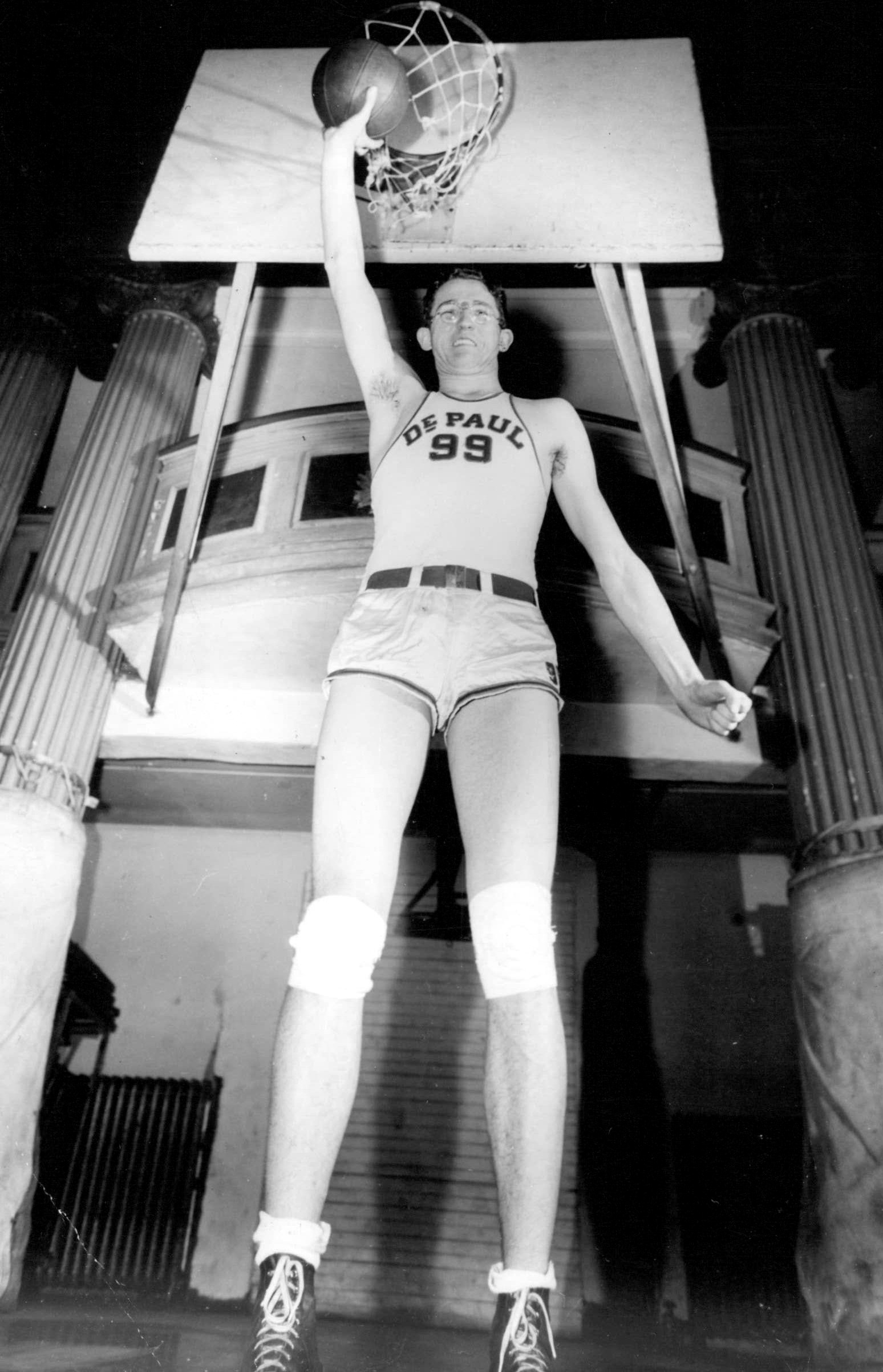
George Mikan, DePaul, 1945

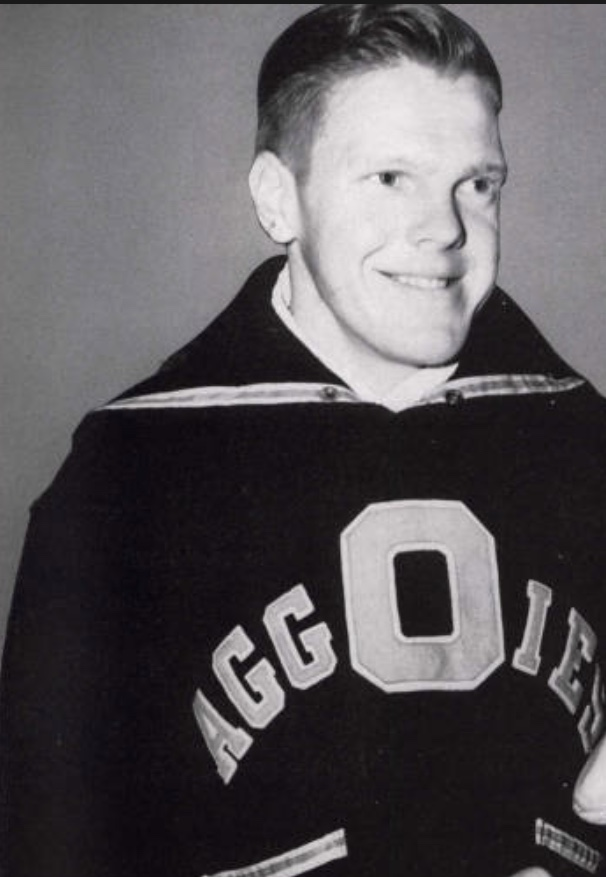
Bob Kurland, Oklahoma State, 1946

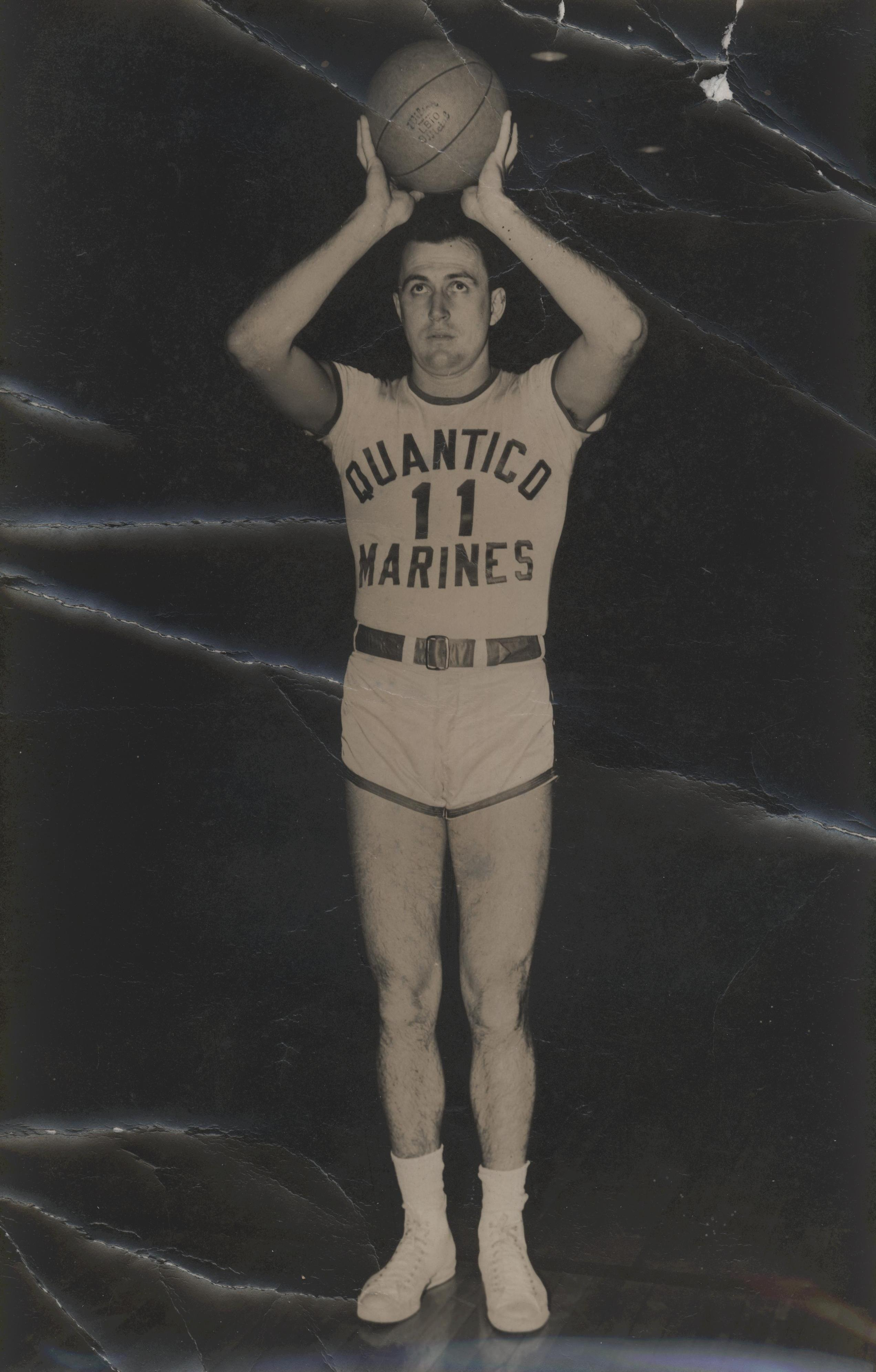
Paul Arizin, Villanova, 1950

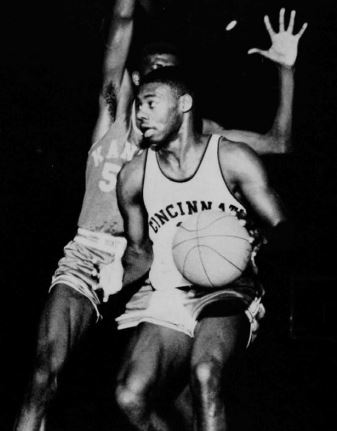
Oscar Robertson, Cincinnati, 1958 through 1960

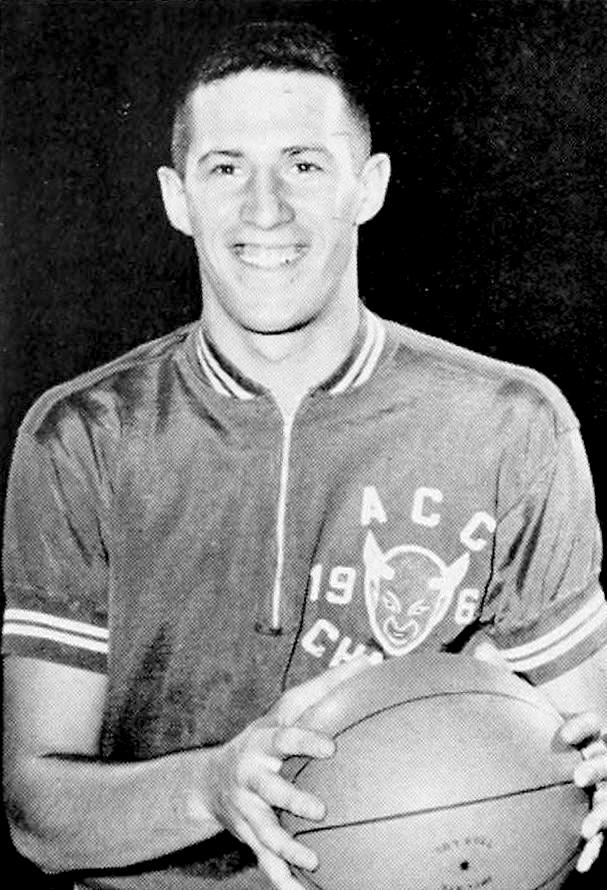
Art Heyman, Duke, 1963

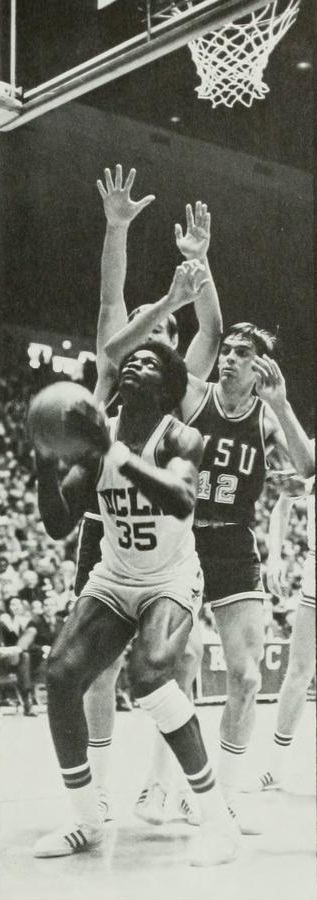
Sidney Wicks, UCLA, 1971

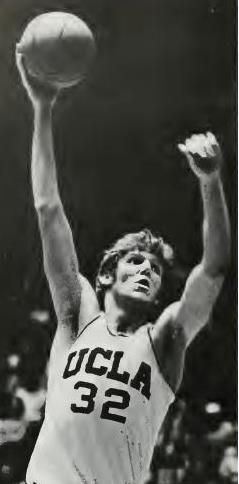
Bill Walton, UCLA, 1972 through 1974

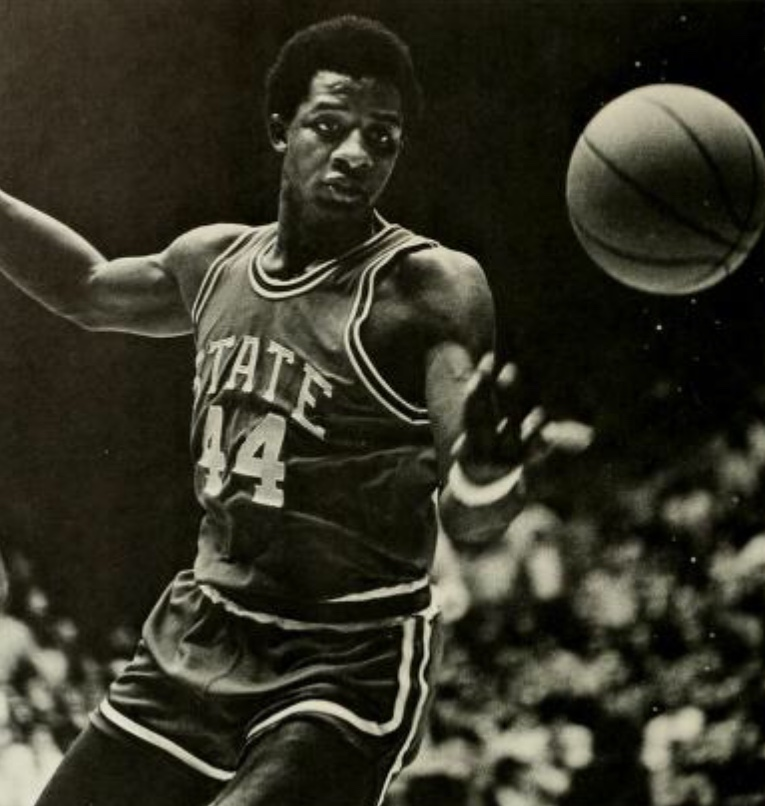
David Thompson, NC State, 1975

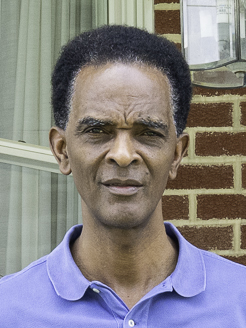
Ralph Sampson, Virginia, 1982

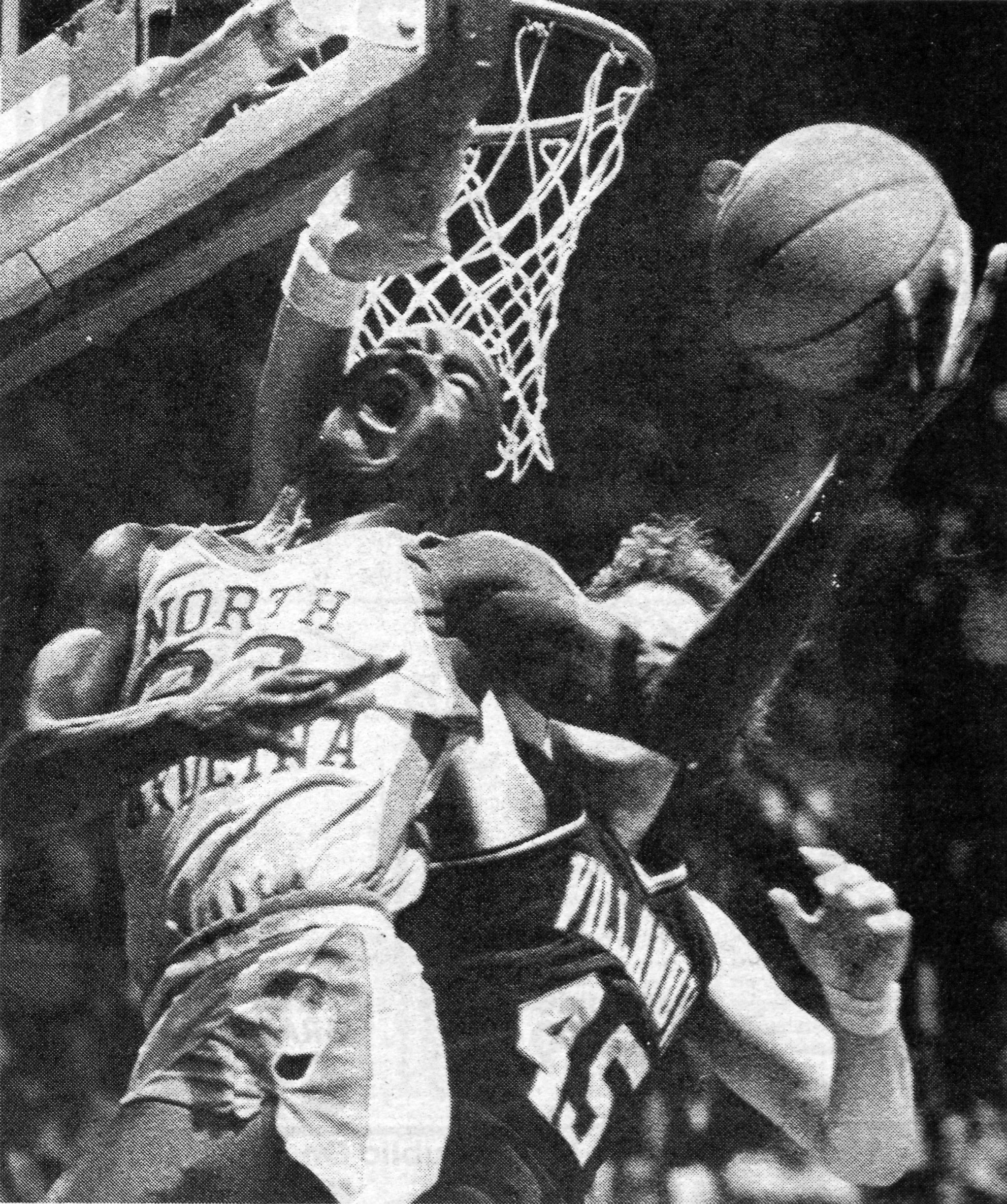
Michael Jordan, North Carolina, 1983 and 1984

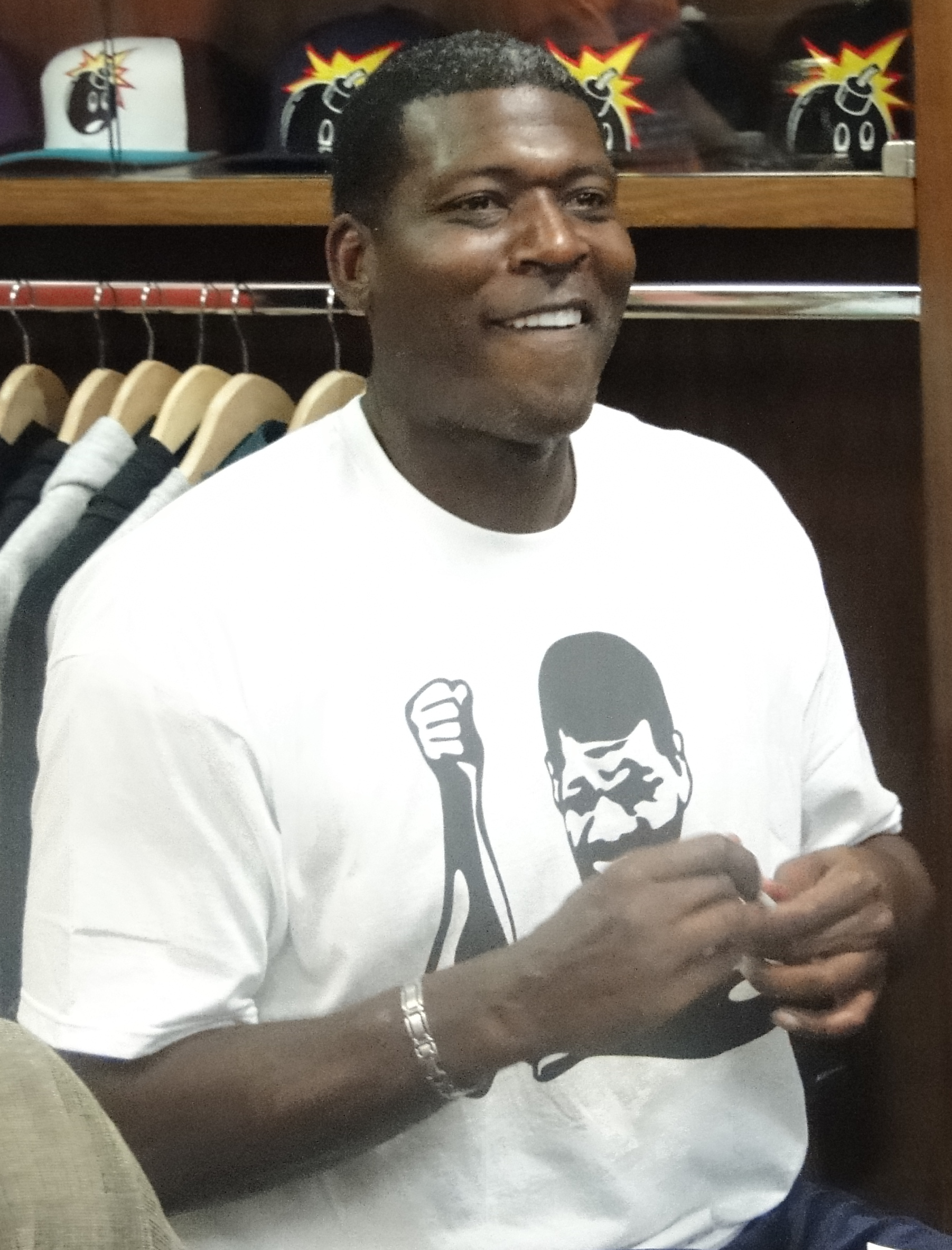
Larry Johnson, UNLV, 1991

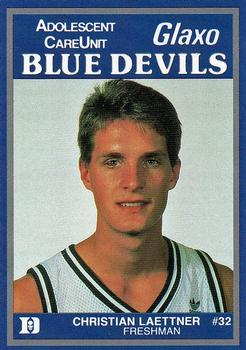
Christian Laettner, Duke, 1992

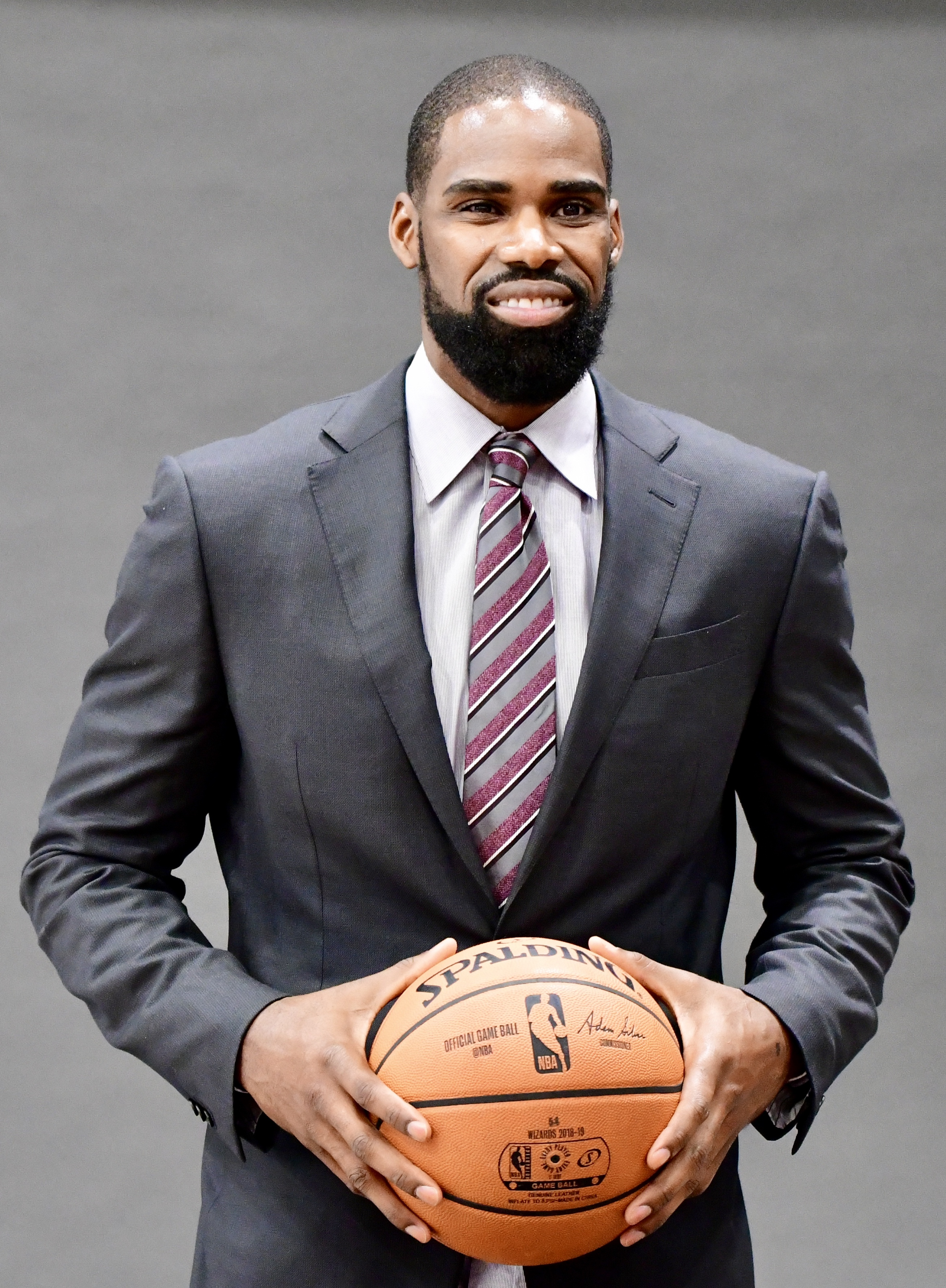
Antawn Jamison, North Carolina, 1998

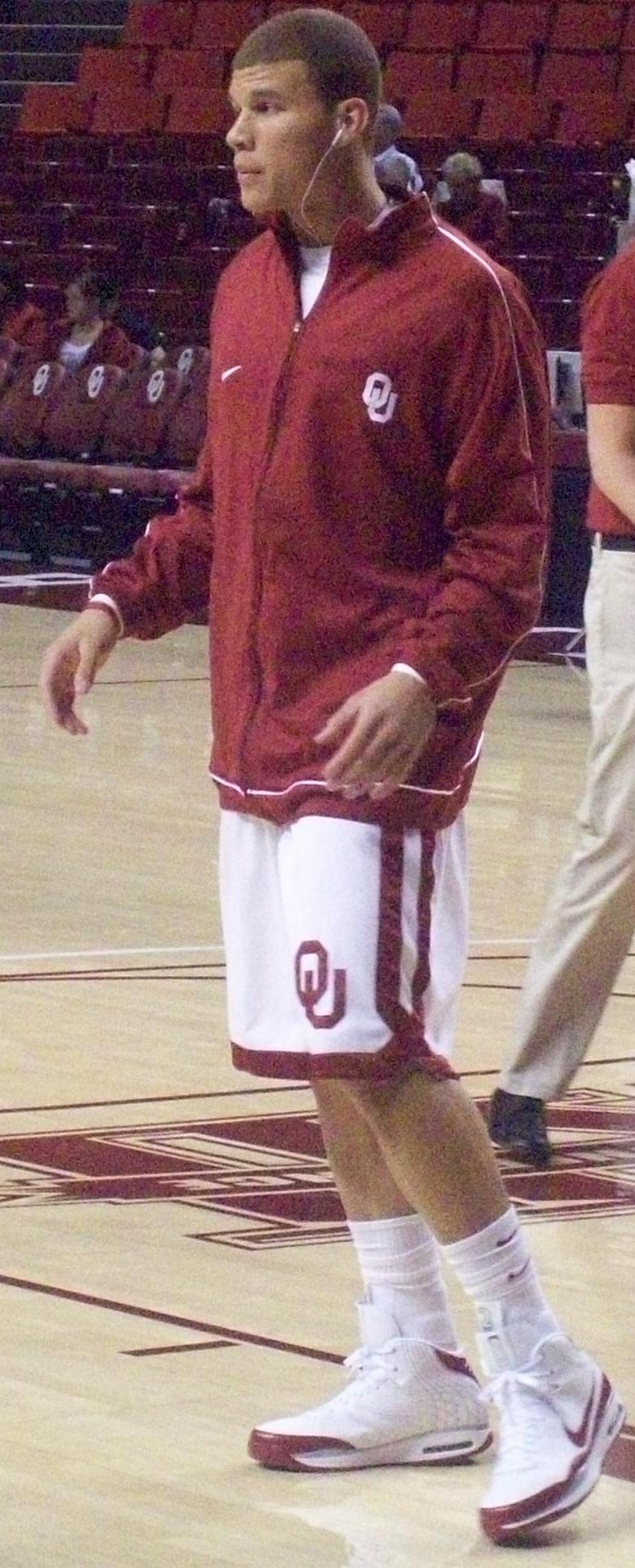
Blake Griffin, Oklahoma, 2009

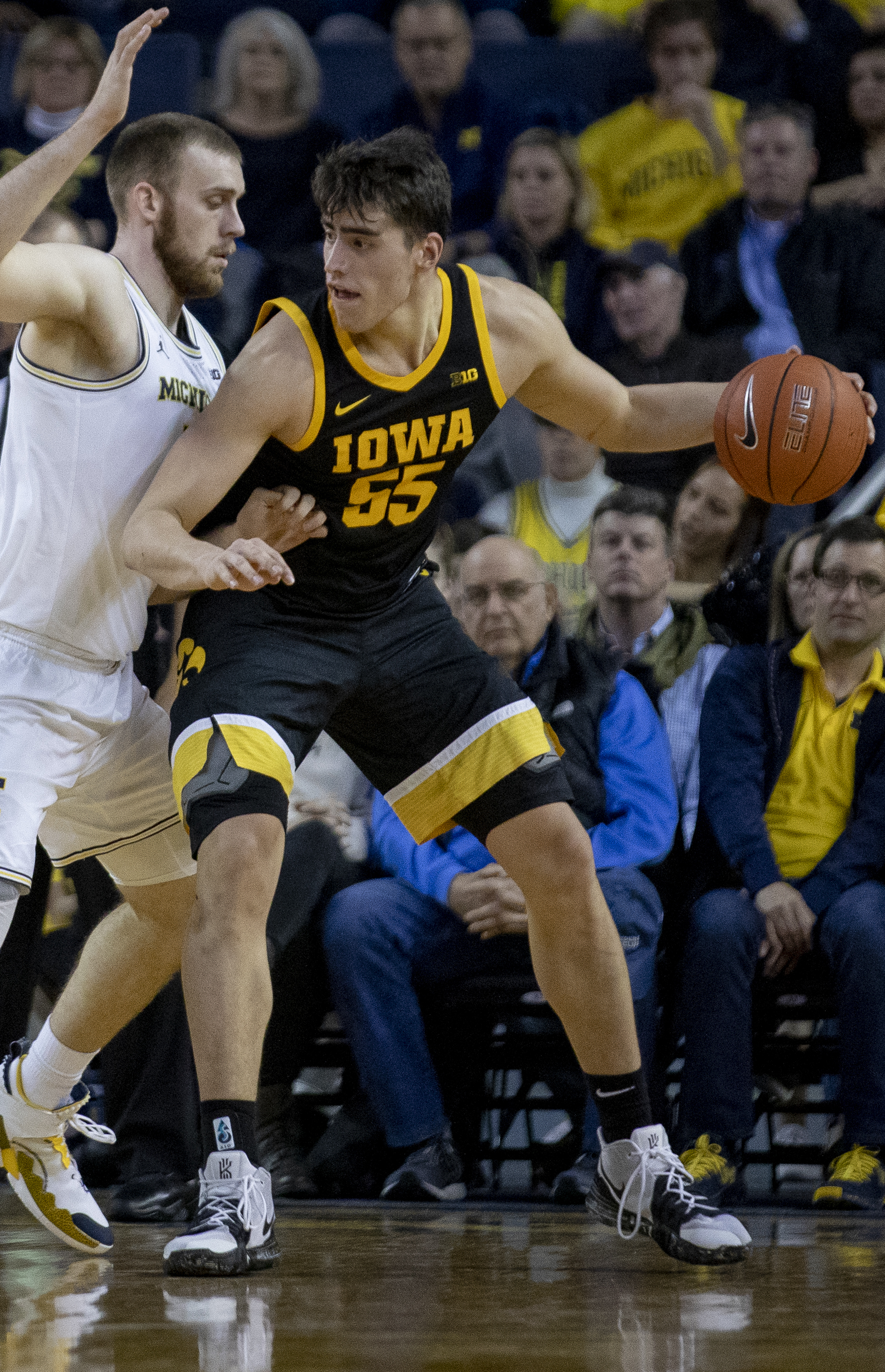
Luka Garza, Iowa, 2020 and 2021

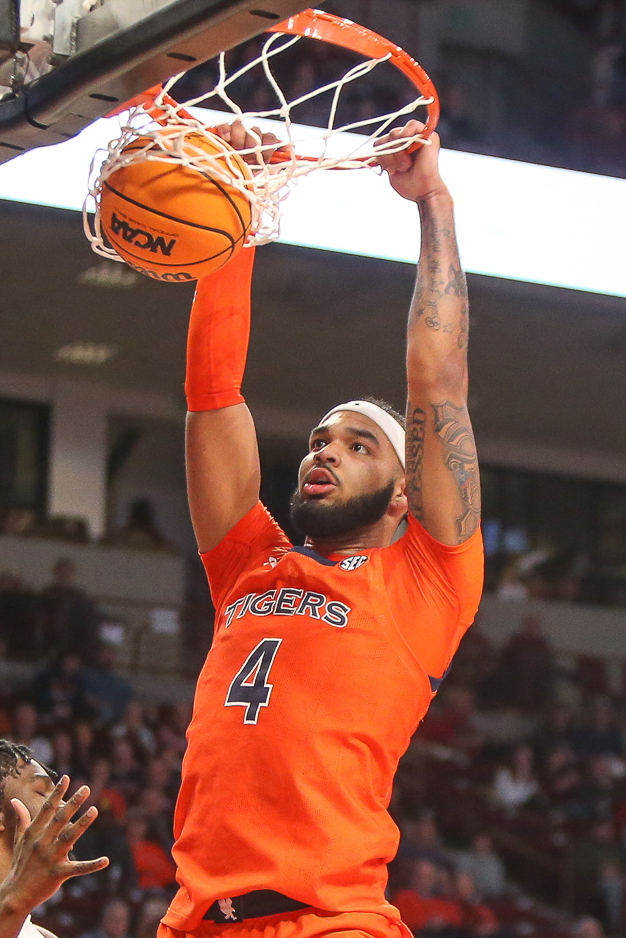
Johni Broome, Auburn, 2025

Season	Player	School	Position	Class	Reference
1942–43	Andy Phillip	Illinois	G / F	Senior	
1943–44	Dale Hall	Army	F	Junior	
1944–45	George Mikan	DePaul	C	Junior	
1945–46	Bob Kurland	Oklahoma State	C	Senior	
1947–49	No winners selected				
1949–50	Paul Arizin	Villanova	F	Senior	
1950–51	Sherman White	LIU^{[a]}	F	Senior	
1952–57	No winners selected				
1957–58	Oscar Robertson	Cincinnati	PG	Sophomore	
1958–59	Oscar Robertson (2)	Cincinnati	PG	Junior	
1959–60	Oscar Robertson (3)	Cincinnati	PG	Senior	
1960–61	Jerry Lucas	Ohio State	F / C	Junior	
1961–62	Jerry Lucas (2)	Ohio State	F / C	Senior	
1962–63	Art Heyman	Duke	G / F	Senior	
1963–64	Bill Bradley	Princeton	SF / SG	Junior	
1964–65	Bill Bradley (2)	Princeton	SF / SG	Senior	
1965–66	Cazzie Russell	Michigan	SG	Senior	
1966–67	Lew Alcindor^{[b]}	UCLA	C	Sophomore	
1967–68	Elvin Hayes	Houston	F / C	Senior	
1968–69	Lew Alcindor^{[b]} (2)	UCLA	C	Senior	
1969–70	Pete Maravich	LSU	PG	Senior	
1970–71	Sidney Wicks	UCLA	PF	Senior	
1971–72	Bill Walton	UCLA	C	Sophomore	
1972–73	Bill Walton (2)	UCLA	C	Junior	
1973–74	Bill Walton (3)	UCLA	C	Senior	
1974–75	David Thompson	NC State	SG / SF	Senior	
1975–76	Scott May	Indiana	SF	Senior	
1976–77	Marques Johnson	UCLA	G / F	Senior	
1977–78	Phil Ford	North Carolina	PG	Senior	
1978–79	Larry Bird	Indiana State	SF	Senior	
1979–80	Darrell Griffith	Louisville	SG	Senior	
1980–81	Mark Aguirre	DePaul	SF	Junior	
1981–82	Ralph Sampson	Virginia	C	Junior	
1982–83	Michael Jordan	North Carolina	SG	Sophomore	
1983–84	Michael Jordan (2)	North Carolina	SG	Junior	
1984–85	Patrick Ewing	Georgetown	C	Senior	
1985–86	Walter Berry	St. John's	PF	Senior	
1986–87	David Robinson	Navy	C	Senior	
1987–88	Hersey Hawkins	Bradley	SG	Senior	
1988–89	Stacey King	Oklahoma	C	Senior	
1989–90	Dennis Scott	Georgia Tech	SF	Junior	
1990–91	Larry Johnson	UNLV	PF	Senior	
1991–92	Christian Laettner	Duke	PF / C	Senior	
1992–93	Calbert Cheaney	Indiana	SF	Senior	
1993–94	Glenn Robinson	Purdue	SF	Junior	
1994–95	Shawn Respert	Michigan State	SG	Senior	
1995–96	Marcus Camby	UMass	C	Junior	
1996–97	Tim Duncan	Wake Forest	C	Senior	
1997–98	Antawn Jamison	North Carolina	SF	Junior	
1998–99	Elton Brand	Duke	C	Sophomore	
1999–00	Kenyon Martin	Cincinnati	PF	Senior	
2000–01	Shane Battier	Duke	SF / SG	Senior	
2001–02	Jason Williams	Duke	PG	Junior	
2002–03	T. J. Ford	Texas	PG	Sophomore	
2003–04	Jameer Nelson	Saint Joseph's	PG	Senior	
2004–05	Dee Brown	Illinois	PG	Junior	
2005–06	JJ Redick	Duke	SG	Senior	
2006–07	Kevin Durant	Texas	SF	Freshman	
2007–08	Tyler Hansbrough	North Carolina	PF	Junior	
2008–09	Blake Griffin	Oklahoma	PF	Sophomore	
2009–10	Evan Turner	Ohio State	SF	Junior	
2010–11	Jimmer Fredette	BYU	PG	Senior	
2011–12	Anthony Davis	Kentucky	C	Freshman	
2012–13	Victor Oladipo	Indiana	G	Junior	
2013–14	Doug McDermott	Creighton	SF	Senior	
2014–15	Frank Kaminsky	Wisconsin	PF	Senior	
2015–16	Buddy Hield	Oklahoma	SG	Senior	
2016–17	Frank Mason III	Kansas	PG	Senior	
2017–18	Jalen Brunson	Villanova	PG	Junior	
2018–19	Zion Williamson	Duke	PF	Freshman	
2019–20	Luka Garza	Iowa	C	Junior	
2020–21	Luka Garza (2)	Iowa	C	Senior	
2021–22	Oscar Tshiebwe	Kentucky	PF / C	Junior	
2022–23	Zach Edey	Purdue	C	Junior	
2023–24	Zach Edey (2)	Purdue	C	Senior	
2024–25	Johni Broome	Auburn	PF / C	Senior	
2025–26	Cameron Boozer	Duke	PF	Freshman	

- ^{a} At the time of White's award, Long Island University consisted solely of what is now the institution's Brooklyn campus. In 2019, LIU merged the Brooklyn athletic program with the NCAA Division II program of its Post campus, creating a new D-I program that competes as the LIU Sharks. The Sharks inherited the men's basketball history of the Brooklyn campus.
- ^{b} Lew Alcindor changed his name to Kareem Abdul-Jabbar in 1971 after converting to Islam.

== See also ==
- List of U.S. men's college basketball national player of the year awards
