= 2024–25 Auburn Tigers men's basketball team =

American college basketball season

2024–25 Auburn Tigers men's basketball

Maui Invitational champions SEC regular season champions

NCAA tournament, Final Four
- Conference: Southeastern Conference

Ranking
- Coaches: No. 4
- AP: No. 4
- Record: 32–6 (15–3 SEC)
- Head coach: Bruce Pearl (11th season)
- Assistant coaches: Ira Bowman (7th season); Steven Pearl (8th season); Corey Williams (2nd season); Chad Prewett (2nd season); Mike Burgomaster (2nd season)
- Home arena: Neville Arena

2024–25 Southeastern Conference men's basketball standings
	Conf.				Overall
Team	W		L	PCT	W		L	PCT
No. 4 Auburn	15	–	3	.833	32	–	6	.842
No. 1 Florida †	14	–	4	.778	36	–	4	.900
No. 6 Alabama	13	–	5	.722	28	–	9	.757
No. 5 Tennessee	12	–	6	.667	30	–	8	.789
No. 19 Texas A&M	11	–	7	.611	23	–	11	.676
No. 12 Kentucky	10	–	8	.556	24	–	12	.667
Missouri	10	–	8	.556	22	–	12	.647
No. 18 Ole Miss	10	–	8	.556	24	–	12	.667
No. 20 Arkansas	8	–	10	.444	22	–	14	.611
Mississippi State	8	–	10	.444	21	–	13	.618
Georgia	8	–	10	.444	20	–	13	.606
Vanderbilt	8	–	10	.444	20	–	13	.606
Texas	6	–	12	.333	19	–	16	.543
Oklahoma	6	–	12	.333	20	–	14	.588
LSU	3	–	15	.167	14	–	18	.438
South Carolina	2	–	16	.111	12	–	20	.375
† 2025 SEC tournament winner Rankings from AP poll

The 2024–25 Auburn Tigers men's basketball team represented Auburn University during the 2024–25 NCAA Division I men's basketball season as a member of the Southeastern Conference. The team's head coach was Bruce Pearl in his 11th and final season at Auburn. The team played its home games at Neville Arena in Auburn, Alabama.

Pearl won his 214th game for Auburn at Texas on January 7, surpassing Joel Eaves for the most wins in school history.

Auburn finished the season with a 32–6 overall record and a 15–3 mark in SEC play, earning the program the No. 1 overall seed in the 2025 NCAA tournament.

As the No. 1 seed in the 2025 SEC Tournament, held at Bridgestone Arena in Nashville, Tennessee, Auburn began its postseason run in the quarterfinals with a 62–57 victory over No. 8 seed Ole Miss. In the semifinals, the Tigers faced No. 4 seed Tennessee and were narrowly defeated 70–65, ending their bid for the conference tournament title.

Auburn received a bid to the 2025 NCAA tournament, as the tournament's No. 1 overall seed. They were seeded in the South region. In the First Round, the Tigers defeated No. 16 seed Alabama State, 83–63. They went on to beat No. 9 seed Creighton, 82–70, in the Second Round. In the Sweet Sixteen, Auburn overcame No. 5 seed Michigan with a 78–65 victory. In the Elite Eight, they defeated No. 2 seed Michigan State by a score of 70–64 to claim the South Regional title and advance to the Final Four for the second time in school history.

However, their season came to an end with a 79–73 loss to SEC rival and eventual champion Florida in the Final Four. Chad Baker-Mazara led Auburn with 18 points, while Johni Broome added 15 points and seven rebounds despite playing through a right elbow injury that limited his second-half performance.

Auburn's 32 victories in the 2024–25 season surpassed the program's previous single-season record set by the 2018–19 team, which won 30 games.

Pearl would retire from coaching only a month prior to the 2025–26 season, leaving his son Steven in charge.

== Previous season ==
The 2023–24 Auburn Tigers men's basketball team finished the 2023–24 season with a record of 27–8, 13–5 in Southeastern Conference play to finish tied for second place in the conference. As the No. 4 seed in the SEC tournament, they defeated South Carolina, Mississippi State, and Florida to win the tournament championship. The Tigers received the conference's automatic bid to the NCAA tournament as the No. 4 seed in the East Region. In the first round, they suffered a 78–76 upset loss to Yale.

== Offseason ==
=== Departures ===
Name	Number	Pos.	Height	Weight	Year	Hometown	Reason for departure
K. D. Johnson	0	G	6'0"	190	Senior	Atlanta, GA	Transferred to George Mason
Aden Holloway	1	G	6'1"	178	Freshman	Charlotte, NC	Transferred to Alabama
Jaylin Williams	2	G	6'8"	245	Grad	Nahunta, GA	Graduated
Tre Donaldson	3	G	6'3"	200	Sophomore	Tallahassee, FL	Transferred to Michigan
Carter Sobera	20	G	6'5"	210	Senior	Birmingham, AL	Graduated
Lior Berman	24	G	6'4"	210	Grad	Birmingham, AL	Graduated
Lucas Clanton	33	G	6'1"	175	Freshman	Shelbyville, TN	Walk-on; Transferred
Jalen Harper	55	G	6'2"	165	Grad	Mableton, GA	Walk-on; Graduated

=== Incoming transfers ===
Name	Number	Pos.	Height	Weight	Year	Hometown	Previous School
JP Pegues	1	G	6'2"	165	Senior	Nashville, TN	Furman
Ja'Heim Hudson	8	F	6'7"	220	Senior	Hinesville, GA	SMU
Miles Kelly	13	G	6'6"	180	Senior	Stone Mountain, GA	Georgia Tech

=== 2024 recruiting class ===
College recruiting information
Name	Hometown	School	Height	Weight	Commit date
Tahaad Pettiford #2 PG	Jersey City, New Jersey	Hudson Catholic (NJ)	6 ft 1 in (1.85 m)	175 lb (79 kg)	Feb 2, 2023
Tahaad Pettiford #2 PG	Recruit ratings: Rivals: 247Sports: ESPN: (88)				
Jakhi Howard #13 SF	Boston, Massachusetts	Overtime Elite (GA)	6 ft 6 in (1.98 m)	185 lb (84 kg)	Nov 14, 2023
Jakhi Howard #13 SF	Recruit ratings: Rivals: 247Sports: ESPN: (86)				
Overall recruit ranking: Rivals: 22 247Sports: 21
Note: In many cases, Scout, Rivals, 247Sports, On3, and ESPN may conflict in their listings of height and weight.; In these cases, the average was taken. ESPN grades are on a 100-point scale.; Sources: "Auburn 2024 Basketball Commitments". Rivals.; "2024 Auburn Tigers Recruiting Class". ESPN.; "2024 Team Ranking". Rivals.

=== 2025 recruiting class ===
College recruiting information (2025)
Name	Hometown	School	Height	Weight	Commit date
Sebastian Williams-Adams #13 SF	Houston, Texas	St. John's (TX)	6 ft 7 in (2.01 m)	230 lb (100 kg)	Nov 17, 2024
Sebastian Williams-Adams #13 SF	Recruit ratings: Rivals: 247Sports: ESPN: (86)				
Kaden Magwood #11 PG	Louisville, Kentucky	Combine Academy (NC)	6 ft 1 in (1.85 m)	170 lb (77 kg)	Nov 12, 2024
Kaden Magwood #11 PG	Recruit ratings: Rivals: 247Sports: ESPN: (87)				
Simon Walker #29 SG	Huntsville, Alabama	Huntsville (AL)	6 ft 5 in (1.96 m)	185 lb (84 kg)	Sep 26, 2024
Simon Walker #29 SG	Recruit ratings: Rivals: 247Sports: ESPN: (82)				
Overall recruit ranking: Rivals: 16 247Sports: 15
Note: In many cases, Scout, Rivals, 247Sports, On3, and ESPN may conflict in their listings of height and weight.; In these cases, the average was taken. ESPN grades are on a 100-point scale.; Sources: "Auburn 2024 Basketball Commitments". Rivals.; "2024 Auburn Tigers Recruiting Class". ESPN.; "2024 Team Ranking". Rivals.

== Roster ==
2024–25 Auburn Tigers men's basketball team
Players
Coaches

Pos.	#	Name	Height	Weight	Year	Previous school	Hometown
G	0	Tahaad Pettiford	6 ft 1 in (1.85 m)	175 lb (79 kg)	Fr	Hudson Catholic Regional HS	Jersey City, NJ
G	1	JP Pegues	6 ft 2 in (1.88 m)	165 lb (75 kg)	Sr	Furman	Nashville, TN
G	2	Denver Jones	6 ft 4 in (1.93 m)	205 lb (93 kg)	Sr	Florida International	New Market, AL
F	3	Jakhi Howard	6 ft 6 in (1.98 m)	185 lb (84 kg)	Fr	Overtime Elite	Boston, MA
F/C	4	Johni Broome	6 ft 10 in (2.08 m)	240 lb (109 kg)	GS	Morehead State	Plant City, FL
F	5	Chris Moore	6 ft 6 in (1.98 m)	220 lb (100 kg)	GS	West Memphis HS	West Memphis, AR
G	7	CJ Williams (W)	6 ft 2 in (1.88 m)	175 lb (79 kg)	Jr	Texas Tech	Fayetteville, AR
F	8	Ja'Heim Hudson	6 ft 7 in (2.01 m)	220 lb (100 kg)	Sr	SMU	Hinesville, GA
G/F	10	Chad Baker-Mazara	6 ft 7 in (2.01 m)	180 lb (82 kg)	GS	Northwest Florida State	Santo Domingo, Dominican Republic
G	13	Miles Kelly	6 ft 6 in (1.98 m)	180 lb (82 kg)	Sr	Georgia Tech	Stone Mountain, GA
G	14	Presley Patterson (W)	5 ft 11 in (1.8 m)	180 lb (82 kg)	Jr	Knoxville Catholic HS	Knoxville, TN
G	21	Blake Muschalek (W)	6 ft 3 in (1.91 m)	178 lb (81 kg)	So	Trinity Christian Academy	Dallas, TX
F/C	23	Addarin Scott	6 ft 9 in (2.06 m)	207 lb (94 kg)	Sr	Navarro	Dallas, TX
F	31	Chaney Johnson	6 ft 7 in (2.01 m)	220 lb (100 kg)	GS	UAH	Alabaster, AL
C	42	Haston Alexander (W)	6 ft 10 in (2.08 m)	255 lb (116 kg)	Jr	Covenant Christian School	Tuscumbia, AL
C	44	Dylan Cardwell	6 ft 11 in (2.11 m)	255 lb (116 kg)	GS	McEachern HS	Augusta, GA

Head coach

- Bruce Pearl (Boston College)

Assistant coach(es)

- Ira Bowman (Penn)
- Steven Pearl (Tennessee)
- Corey Williams (Oklahoma State)
- Chad Prewett (Troy)
- Mike Burgomaster (Miami (FL))

Legend

- (C) Team captain
- (S) Suspended
- (I) Ineligible
- (W) Walk-on
- Injured
- Current redshirt

Roster
Last update: June 12, 2024

== Schedule ==
Date time, TV	Rank^{#}	Opponent^{#}	Result	Record	High points	High rebounds	High assists	Site (attendance) city, state
Exhibition
October 27, 2024*; 12:00 p.m.	No. 11	at Furman	W 83–62	–	18 – Broome	14 – Broome	3 – Tied	Bon Secours Wellness Arena (4,017); Greenville, SC
November 1, 2024*; 7:00 p.m.	No. 11	Florida Atlantic	W 102–70	–	15 – Tied	9 – Broome	6 – Baker-Mazara	Neville Arena (9,121); Auburn, AL
Non-conference regular season
November 6, 2024*; 7:00 p.m., SECN+/ESPN+	No. 11	Vermont	W 94–43	1–0	21 – Kelly	9 – Johnson	4 – Pettiford	Neville Arena (9,121); Auburn, AL
November 9, 2024*; 8:30 p.m., ESPNU	No. 11	vs. No. 4 Houston; The Battleground 2k24	W 74−69	2–0	21 – Pettiford	10 – Johnson	4 – Johnson	Toyota Center (6,901); Houston, TX
November 13, 2024*; 7:00 p.m., SECN+/ESPN+	No. 5	Kent State	W 79–56	3–0	18 – Tied	12 – Broome	4 – Tied	Neville Arena (9,121); Auburn, AL
November 18, 2024*; 8:00 p.m., SECN	No. 4	North Alabama	W 102–69	4–0	30 – Broome	17 – Broome	9 – Jones	Neville Arena (9,121); Auburn, AL
November 25, 2024*; 8:00 p.m., ESPNU	No. 4	vs. No. 5 Iowa State; Maui Invitational quarterfinal	W 83–81	5–0	21 – Broome	10 – Broome	3 – Cardwell	Lahaina Civic Center (2,400); Lahaina, HI
November 26, 2024*; 10:00 p.m., ESPN	No. 4	vs. No. 12 North Carolina; Maui Invitational semifinal	W 85–72	6–0	23 – Broome	19 – Broome	5 – Broome	Lahaina Civic Center (2,400); Lahaina, HI
November 27, 2024*; 4:00 p.m., ESPN	No. 4	vs. Memphis; Maui Invitational championship	W 90–76	7–0	21 – Broome	16 – Broome	6 – Tied	Lahaina Civic Center (2,400); Lahaina, HI
December 4, 2024*; 8:15 p.m., ESPN	No. 2	at No. 9 Duke; ACC–SEC Challenge	L 78–84	7–1	20 – Tied	12 – Broome	4 – Jones	Cameron Indoor Stadium (9,314); Durham, NC
December 8, 2024*; 11:00 a.m., SECN	No. 2	Richmond	W 98–54	8–1	15 – Tied	6 – Tied	6 – Broome	Neville Arena (9,121); Auburn, AL
December 14, 2024*; 12:00 p.m., ESPN2	No. 2	vs. Ohio State; Holiday Hoopsgiving	W 91–53	9–1	21 – Broome	20 – Broome	6 – Broome	State Farm Arena (12,900); Atlanta, GA
December 17, 2024*; 7:00 p.m., SECN+/ESPN+	No. 2	Georgia State	W 100–59	10–1	26 – Johnson	8 – Johnson	6 – Baker-Mazara	Neville Arena (9,121); Auburn, AL
December 21, 2024*; 3:30 p.m., ESPN	No. 2	vs. No. 16 Purdue; Battle in Birmingham	W 87–69	11–1	23 – Broome	11 – Broome	6 – Baker-Mazara	Legacy Arena (15,355); Birmingham, AL
December 30, 2024*; 5:30 p.m., SECN+/ESPN+	No. 2	Monmouth	W 87–58	12–1	14 – Broome	11 – Tied	5 – Pettiford	Neville Arena (9,121); Auburn, AL
SEC regular season
January 4, 2025; 3:00 p.m., SECN	No. 2	Missouri	W 84–68	13–1 (1–0)	24 – Broome	7 – Tied	7 – Jones	Neville Arena (9,121); Auburn, AL
January 7, 2025; 8:00 p.m., ESPN2	No. 2	at Texas	W 87–82	14–1 (2–0)	20 – Broome	12 – Broome	5 – Broome	Moody Center (10,516); Austin, TX
January 11, 2025; 12:00 p.m., SECN	No. 2	at South Carolina	W 66–63	15–1 (3–0)	15 – Pettiford	7 – Cardwell	3 – Jones	Colonial Life Arena (13,390); Columbia, SC
January 14, 2025; 6:00 p.m., SECN	No. 1	No. 15 Mississippi State	W 88–66	16–1 (4–0)	20 – Baker-Mazara	10 – Kelly	3 – Tied	Neville Arena (9,121); Auburn, AL
January 18, 2025; 12:00 p.m., SECN	No. 1	at No. 23 Georgia	W 70–68	17–1 (5–0)	24 – Pettiford	7 – Cardwell	3 – Cardwell	Stegeman Coliseum (10,523); Athens, GA
January 25, 2025; 7:30 p.m., ESPN	No. 1	No. 6 Tennessee; ESPN College GameDay	W 53–51	18–1 (6–0)	16 – Broome	13 – Broome	2 – Tied	Neville Arena (9,121); Auburn, AL
January 29, 2025; 6:00 p.m., SECN	No. 1	at LSU	W 87–74	19–1 (7–0)	26 – Broome	16 – Broome	7 – Baker-Mazara	Pete Maravich Assembly Center (10,098); Baton Rouge, LA
February 1, 2025; 1:00 p.m., ESPN	No. 1	at No. 23 Ole Miss	W 92–82	20–1 (8–0)	20 – Broome	13 – Cardwell	5 – Pettiford	SJB Pavilion (9,974); Oxford, MS
February 4, 2025; 8:00 p.m., SECN	No. 1	Oklahoma	W 98–70	21–1 (9–0)	15 – Tied	8 – Johnson	6 – Broome	Neville Arena (9,121); Auburn, AL
February 8, 2025; 3:00 p.m., ESPN2	No. 1	No. 6 Florida	L 81–90	21–2 (9–1)	22 – Kelly	12 – Cardwell	6 – Broome	Neville Arena (9,121); Auburn, AL
February 11, 2025; 6:00 p.m., SECN	No. 1	at Vanderbilt	W 80–68	22–2 (10–1)	21 – Jones	7 – Broome	4 – Baker-Mazara	Memorial Gymnasium (13,032); Nashville, TN
February 15, 2025; 3:00 p.m., ESPN	No. 1	at No. 2 Alabama; Rivalry/ESPN College GameDay	W 94–85	23–2 (11–1)	19 – Broome	14 – Broome	6 – Broome	Coleman Coliseum (13,474); Tuscaloosa, AL
February 19, 2025; 8:00 p.m., ESPN	No. 1	Arkansas	W 67–60	24–2 (12–1)	16 – Broome	13 – Broome	4 – Pettiford	Neville Arena (9,121); Auburn, AL
February 22, 2025; 3:00 p.m., ESPN	No. 1	Georgia	W 82–70	25–2 (13–1)	31 – Broome	14 – Broome	5 – Pettiford	Neville Arena (9,121); Auburn, AL
February 26, 2025; 6:00 p.m., ESPN2	No. 1	Ole Miss	W 106–76	26–2 (14–1)	24 – Broome	9 – Broome	6 – Pettiford	Neville Arena (9,121); Auburn, AL
March 1, 2025; 12:00 p.m., ABC	No. 1	at No. 17 Kentucky	W 94–78	27–2 (15–1)	30 – Kelly	6 – Broome	4 – Pettiford	Rupp Arena (21,268); Lexington, KY
March 4, 2025; 8:00 p.m., ESPN	No. 1	at No. 22 Texas A&M	L 72–83	27–3 (15–2)	19 – Pettiford	7 – Broome	5 – Baker-Mazara	Reed Arena (12,257); College Station, TX
March 8, 2025; 1:30 p.m., ESPN	No. 1	No. 7 Alabama; Rivalry	L 91–93 ^{OT}	27–4 (15–3)	34 – Broome	8 – Tied	6 – Tied	Neville Arena (9,121); Auburn, AL
SEC Tournament
March 14, 2025; 12:00 p.m., ESPN	(1) No. 3	vs. (8) Ole Miss; Quarterfinals	W 62–57	28–4	23 – Broome	15 – Broome	6 – Baker-Mazara	Bridgestone Arena (17,526); Nashville, TN
March 15, 2025; 12:00 p.m., ESPN	(1) No. 3	vs. (4) No. 8 Tennessee; Semifinals	L 65–70	28–5	23 – Broome	7 – Broome	3 – Tied	Bridgestone Arena (19,049); Nashville, TN
NCAA Tournament
March 20, 2025*; 1:50 p.m., CBS	(1 S) No. 4	vs. (16 S) Alabama State; First Round	W 83–63	29–5	23 – Kelly	11 – Broome	6 – Jones	Rupp Arena (18,769); Lexington, KY
March 22, 2025*; 6:10 p.m., TBS	(1 S) No. 4	vs. (9 S) Creighton; Second Round	W 82–70	30–5	23 – Pettiford	12 – Broome	3 – Tied	Rupp Arena (17,484); Lexington, KY
March 28, 2025*; 8:39 p.m., CBS	(1 S) No. 4	vs. (5 S) No. 14 Michigan; Sweet Sixteen	W 78–65	31–5	22 – Broome	16 – Broome	3 – Tied	State Farm Arena (16,743); Atlanta, GA
March 30, 2025*; 4:05 p.m., CBS	(1 S) No. 4	vs. (2 S) No. 8 Michigan State; Elite Eight	W 70–64	32–5	25 – Broome	14 – Broome	5 – Baker-Mazara	State Farm Arena (16,768); Atlanta, GA
April 5, 2025*; 5:09 p.m., CBS	(1 S) No. 4	vs. (1 W) No. 3 Florida; Final Four	L 73–79	32–6	18 – Baker-Mazara	8 – Cardwell	4 – Pettiford	Alamodome (68,252); San Antonio, TX
*Non-conference game. ^{#}Rankings from AP Poll. (#) Tournament seedings in parentheses. S=South W=West. All times are in Central Time.

== Exhibitions ==
=== at Furman ===
October 27, 2024
12:00 p.m.

Recap

No. 11 Auburn Tigers 83, Furman Paladins 62
Scoring by half: 36–29, 47–33
Pts: Johni Broome, 18; Rebs: Johni Broome, 14; Asts: Tied, 3	Pts: Nick Anderson, 19; Rebs: Ben VanderWal, 6 Asts: Garrett Hein, 3

Bon Secours Wellness Arena, Greenville, SC
Attendance: 4,017
Referees: Chuck Jones, Mike Nance, Devyn Page

=== Florida Atlantic ===
November 1, 2024
7:00 p.m.

Recap

Florida Atlantic Owls 70, No. 11 Auburn Tigers 102
Scoring by half: 28–49, 42–53
Pts: Kaleb Glenn, 16; Rebs: Kaleb Glenn, 8 Asts: Tied, 2	Pts: Tied, 15; Rebs: Johni Broome, 9 Asts: Chad Baker-Mazara, 6

Neville Arena, Auburn, AL
Attendance: 9,121
Referees: Joe Lindsay, Todd Austin, Chris Ford

== Game summaries ==
=== Vermont ===
SECN+
ESPN+

November 6, 2024
7:00 p.m.

Recap

Vermont Catamounts 43, No. 11 Auburn Tigers 94
Scoring by half: 21–46, 22–48
Pts: Seth Joba, 8 Rebs: Sean Blake, 5 Asts: Sean Blake, 3	Pts: Miles Kelly, 21; Rebs: Chaney Johnson, 9 Asts: Tahaad Pettiford, 4

Neville Arena, Auburn, AL
Attendance: 9,121
Referees: Pat Adams, Terry Oglesby, Hunter Allen

=== vs No. 4 Houston ===
ESPNU

November 9, 2024
8:30 p.m.

Recap

No. 11 Auburn Tigers 74, No. 4 Houston Cougars 69
Scoring by half: 28–33, 46–36
Pts: Tahaad Pettiford, 21; Rebs: Chaney Johnson, 10; Asts: Chaney Johnson, 4	Pts: Tied, 13; Rebs: J'Wan Roberts, 7 Asts: Milos Uzan, 4

Toyota Center, Houston, TX
Attendance: 6,901
Referees: Terry Oglesby, Greg Nixon, Michael Greenstein

=== Kent State ===
SECN+
ESPN+

November 13, 2024
7:00 p.m.

Recap

Kent State Golden Flashes 56, No. 5 Auburn Tigers 79
Scoring by half: 22–36, 34–43
Pts: VonCameron Davis, 19; Rebs: Cli'ron Hornbeak, 7 Asts: Cian Medley, 2	Pts: Tied, 18; Rebs: Johni Broome, 12; Asts: Tied, 4

Neville Arena, Auburn, AL
Attendance: 9,121
Referees: Ron Groover, Todd Austin, R.B. Clyburn

=== North Alabama ===
SECN

November 18, 2024
8:00 p.m.

Recap

North Alabama Lions 69, No. 4 Auburn Tigers 102
Scoring by half: 37–50, 32–52
Pts: Jacari Lane, 16; Rebs: Corneilous Williams, 8 Asts: Will Soucie, 3	Pts: Johni Broome, 30; Rebs: Johni Broome, 17; Asts: Denver Jones, 9

Neville Arena, Auburn, AL
Attendance: 9,121
Referees: Doug Shows, Olandis Poole, Michael Wallace

=== vs No. 5 Iowa State (Maui Invitational quarterfinal) ===
ESPNU

November 25, 2024
8:00 p.m.

Recap

No. 4 Auburn Tigers 83, No. 5 Iowa State Cyclones 81
Scoring by half: 33–49, 50–32
Pts: Johni Broome, 21; Rebs: Johni Broome, 10; Asts: Dylan Cardwell, 3	Pts: Keshon Gilbert, 23; Rebs: Joshua Jefferson, 8 Asts: Curtis Jones, 3

Lahaina Civic Center, Lahaina, HI
Attendance: 2,400
Referees: Marques Pettigrew, Amy Bonner, Owen Shortt

=== vs No. 12 North Carolina (Maui Invitational semifinal) ===
ESPN

November 26, 2024
10:00 p.m.

Recap

No. 4 Auburn Tigers 85, No. 12 North Carolina Tar Heels 72
Scoring by half: 40–32, 45–40
Pts: Johni Broome, 23; Rebs: Johni Broome, 19; Asts: Johni Broome, 5	Pts: Seth Trimble, 17; Rebs: Ven-Allen Lubin, 9 Asts: Elliot Cadeau, 3

Lahaina Civic Center, Lahaina, HI
Attendance: 2,400
Referees: Marques Pettigrew, Steven Anderson, Scott Brown

=== vs Memphis (Maui Invitational championship) ===
ESPN

November 27, 2024
4:00 p.m.

Recap

Memphis Tigers 76, No. 4 Auburn Tigers 90
Scoring by half: 31–47, 45–43
Pts: PJ Haggerty, 27; Rebs: PJ Haggerty, 9 Asts: Tyrese Hunter, 5	Pts: Johni Broome, 21; Rebs: Johni Broome, 16; Asts: Tied, 6

Lahaina Civic Center, Lahaina, HI
Attendance: 2,400
Referees: Pat Driscoll, Marques Pettigrew, Owen Shortt

=== at No. 9 Duke ===
ESPN

December 4, 2024
8:15 p.m.

Recap

No. 2 Auburn Tigers 78, No. 9 Duke Blue Devils 84
Scoring by half: 36–43, 42–41
Pts: Tied, 20; Rebs: Johni Broome, 12; Asts: Denver Jones, 4	Pts: Cooper Flagg, 22; Rebs: Cooper Flagg, 11; Asts: Cooper Flagg, 4

Cameron Indoor Stadium, Durham, NC
Attendance: 9.314
Referees: Ron Groover, Bill Covington Jr., Clarence Armstrong

=== Richmond ===
SECN

December 8, 2024
11:00 a.m.

Recap

Richmond Spiders 54, No. 2 Auburn Tigers 98
Scoring by half: 27–52, 27–46
Pts: Mikkel Tyne, 16; Rebs: Mike Walz, 7 Asts: Tied, 3	Pts: Tied, 15; Rebs: Tied, 6 Asts: Johni Broome, 6

Neville Arena, Auburn, AL
Attendance: 9,121
Referees: Bart Lenox, Vladimir Voyard-Tadal, K.B. Burdett Jr.

=== vs Ohio State ===
ESPN2

December 14, 2024
12:00 p.m.

Recap

Ohio State Buckeyes 53, No. 2 Auburn Tigers 91
Scoring by half: 21–49, 32–42
Pts: Devin Royal, 14; Rebs: Sean Stewart, 6 Asts: Tied, 2	Pts: Johni Broome, 21; Rebs: Johni Broome, 20; Asts: Johni Broome, 6

State Farm Arena, Atlanta, GA
Attendance: 12,900
Referees: Terry Oglesby, Byron Jarrett, Owen Shortt

=== Georgia State ===
SECN+
ESPN+

December 17, 2024
7:00 p.m.

Recap

Georgia State Panthers 59, No. 2 Auburn Tigers 100
Scoring by half: 31–43, 28–57
Pts: Tied, 15; Rebs: Nick McMullen, 16; Asts: Tied, 2	Pts: Chaney Johnson, 26; Rebs: Chaney Johnson, 8 Asts: Chad Baker-Mazara, 6

Neville Arena, Auburn, AL
Attendance: 9,121
Referees: Steven Anderson, Olandis Poole, Landon Brandes

=== vs No. 16 Purdue ===
ESPN

December 21, 2024
3:30 p.m.

Recap

No. 16 Purdue Boilermakers 69, No. 2 Auburn Tigers 87
Scoring by half: 26–41, 43–46
Pts: C.J. Cox, 16; Rebs: Trey Kaufman-Renn, 8 Asts: Braden Smith, 6	Pts: Johni Broome, 23; Rebs: Johni Broome, 11; Asts: Chad Baker-Mazara, 6

Legacy Arena, Birmingham, AL
Attendance: 15,355
Referees: Terry Oglesby, Jeff Anderson, K.B. Burdett Jr.

=== Monmouth ===
SECN+
ESPN+

December 30, 2024
5:30 p.m.

Recap

Monmouth Hawks 58, No. 2 Auburn Tigers 87
Scoring by half: 28–46, 30–41
Pts: Abdi Bashir Jr., 15; Rebs: Tied, 4 Asts: Abdi Bashir Jr., 4	Pts: Johni Broome, 14; Rebs: Tied, 11; Asts: Tahaad Pettiford, 5

Neville Arena, Auburn, AL
Attendance: 9,121
Referees: Joe Lindsay, Jason Baker, Michael Wallace

=== Missouri ===
SECN

January 4, 2025
3:00 p.m.

Recap

Missouri Tigers 68, No. 2 Auburn Tigers 84
Scoring by half: 33–45, 35–39
Pts: Marques Warrick, 19; Rebs: Caleb Grill, 6 Asts: Tony Perkins, 3	Pts: Johni Broome, 24; Rebs: Tied, 7 Asts: Denver Jones, 7

Neville Arena, Auburn, AL
Attendance: 9,121
Referees: Pat Adams, K.B. Burdett Jr., Patrick Evans

=== at Texas ===
ESPN2

January 7, 2025
8:00 p.m.

Recap

No. 2 Auburn Tigers 87, Texas Longhorns 82
Scoring by half: 39–27, 48–55
Pts: Johni Broome, 20; Rebs: Johni Broome, 12; Asts: Johni Broome, 5	Pts: Arthur Kaluma, 34; Rebs: Arthur Kaluma, 8 Asts: Tied, 2

Moody Center, Austin, TX
Attendance: 10,516
Referees: Terry Oglesby, Joe Lindsay, Byron Jarrett

=== at South Carolina ===
SECN

January 11, 2025
12:00 p.m.

Recap

No. 2 Auburn Tigers 66, South Carolina Gamecocks 63
Scoring by half: 34–40, 32–23
Pts: Tahaad Pettiford, 15; Rebs: Dylan Cardwell, 7 Asts: Denver Jones, 3	Pts: Collin Murray-Boyles, 25; Rebs: Nick Pringle, 10; Asts: Jacobi Wright, 4

Colonial Life Arena, Columbia, SC
Attendance: 13,390
Referees: Bart Lenox, Olandis Poole, Garrick Shannon

=== No. 15 Mississippi State ===
SECN

January 14, 2025
6:00 p.m.

Recap

No. 15 Mississippi State Bulldogs 66, No. 1 Auburn Tigers 88
Scoring by half: 27–46, 39–42
Pts: Josh Hubbard, 17; Rebs: RJ Melendez, 10; Asts: Cameron Matthews, 2	Pts: Chad Baker-Mazara, 20; Rebs: Miles Kelly, 10; Asts: Tied, 3

Neville Arena, Auburn, AL
Attendance: 9,121
Referees: Don Daily, Owen Shortt, Vladimir Voyard-Tadal

=== at No. 23 Georgia ===
SECN

January 18, 2025
12:00 p.m.

Recap

No. 1 Auburn Tigers 70, No. 23 Georgia Bulldogs 68
Scoring by half: 33–27, 37–41
Pts: Tahaad Pettiford, 24; Rebs: Dylan Cardwell, 7 Asts: Dylan Cardwell, 3	Pts: Asa Newell, 16; Rebs: Asa Newell, 10; Asts: Tied, 2

Stegeman Coliseum, Athens, GA
Attendance: 10,523
Referees: Pat Adams, Wil Howard, Mike Nance

=== No. 6 Tennessee ===
ESPN

January 25, 2024
7:30 p.m.

Recap

No. 6 Tennessee Volunteers 51, No. 1 Auburn Tigers 53
Scoring by half: 20–22, 31–31
Pts: Zakai Ziegler, 14; Rebs: Felix Okpara, 9 Asts: Zakai Ziegler, 5	Pts: Johni Broome, 16; Rebs: Johni Broome, 13; Asts: Tied, 2

Neville Arena, Auburn, AL
Attendance: 9,121
Referees: Doug Shows, Byron Jarrett, Jeb Hartness

=== at LSU ===
SECN

January 29, 2025
6:00 p.m.

Recap

No. 1 Auburn Tigers 87, LSU Tigers 74
Scoring by half: 41–29, 46–45
Pts: Cam Carter, 24; Rebs: Corey Chest, 7 Asts: Tied, 2	Pts: Johni Broome, 26; Rebs: Johni Broome, 16; Asts: Chad Baker-Mazara, 7

Pete Maravich Assembly Center, Baton Rouge, LA
Attendance: 10,098
Referees: Joe Lindsay, Bart Lenox, Lee Cassell

=== at No. 23 Ole Miss ===
ESPN

February 1, 2025
1:00 p.m.

Recap

No. 1 Auburn Tigers 92, No. 23 Ole Miss Rebels 82
Scoring by half: 41–34, 51–48
Pts: Johni Broome, 20; Rebs: Dylan Cardwell, 13; Asts: Tahaad Pettiford, 5	Pts: Sean Pedulla, 29; Rebs: Tied, 5 Asts: Jaylen Murray, 4

SJB Pavilion, Oxford, MS
Attendance: 9,974
Referees: Pat Adams, Courtney Green, Patrick Evans

=== Oklahoma ===
SECN

February 4, 2025
8:00 p.m.

Recap

Oklahoma Sooners 70, No. 1 Auburn Tigers 98
Scoring by half: 34–44, 36–54
Pts: Dayton Forsythe, 13; Rebs: Luke Northweather, 6 Asts: Jeremiah Fears, 3	Pts: Tied, 15; Rebs: Chaney Johnson, 8 Asts: Johni Broome, 6

Neville Arena, Auburn, AL
Attendance: 9,121
Referees: K.B. Burdett Jr., Olandis Poole, Todd Austin

=== No. 6 Florida ===
ESPN2

February 8, 2025
3:00 p.m.

Recap

No. 6 Florida Gators 90, No. 1 Auburn Tigers 81
Scoring by half: 48–38, 42–43
Pts: Walter Clayton Jr., 19; Rebs: Alex Condon, 10; Asts: Walter Clayton Jr., 9	Pts: Miles Kelly, 22; Rebs: Dylan Cardwell, 12; Asts: Johni Broome, 6

Neville Arena, Auburn, AL
Attendance: 9,121
Referees: Terry Oglesby, Owen Shortt, Wil Howard

=== at Vanderbilt ===
SECN

February 11, 2025
6:00 p.m.

Recap

No. 1 Auburn Tigers 80, Vanderbilt Commodores 68
Scoring by half: 34–32, 46–36
Pts: Denver Jones, 21; Rebs: Johni Broome, 7 Asts: Chad Baker-Mazara, 4	Pts: Jason Edwards, 13; Rebs: Devin McGlockton, 13; Asts: A.J. Hoggard, 4

Memorial Gymnasium, Nashville, TN
Attendance: 13,032
Referees: Don Daily, Doug Shows, Lucas Santos

=== at No. 2 Alabama ===
ESPN

February 15, 2025
3:00 p.m.

Recap

No. 1 Auburn Tigers 94, No. 2 Alabama Crimson Tide 85
Scoring by half: 42–33, 52–52
Pts: Johni Broome, 19; Rebs: Johni Broome, 11; Asts: Johni Broome, 6	Pts: Mark Sears, 18; Rebs: Tied, 12; Asts: Tied, 2

Coleman Coliseum, Tuscaloosa, AL
Attendance: 13,474
Referees: Pat Adams, Joe Lindsay, Vladimir Voyard-Tadal

=== Arkansas ===
ESPN

February 19, 2025
8:00 p.m.

Recap

Arkansas Razorbacks 60, No. 1 Auburn Tigers 67
Scoring by half: 27–33, 33–34
Pts: Adou Thiero, 16; Rebs: Zvonimir Ivisic, 8 Asts: D.J. Wagner, 5	Pts: Johni Broome, 16; Rebs: Johni Broome, 13; Asts: Tahaad Pettiford, 4

Neville Arena, Auburn, AL
Attendance: 9,121
Referees: Doug Shows, K.B. Burdett Jr., Steven Anderson

=== Georgia ===
ESPN

February 22, 2025
3:00 p.m.

Recap

Georgia Bulldogs 70, No. 1 Auburn Tigers 82
Scoring by half: 24–29, 46–53
Pts: Asa Newell, 20; Rebs: Tied, 5 Asts: Silas Demary Jr., 5	Pts: Johni Broome, 31; Rebs: Johni Broome, 14; Asts: Tahaad Pettiford, 5

Neville Arena, Auburn, AL
Attendance: 9,121
Referees: Don Daily, Todd Austin, Patrick Evans

=== Ole Miss ===
ESPN2

February 26, 2025
6:00 p.m.

Recap

Ole Miss Rebels 76, No. 1 Auburn Tigers 106
Scoring by half: 40–50, 36–56
Pts: Sean Pedulla, 14; Rebs: Tied, 4 Asts: Sean Pedulla, 4	Pts: Johni Broome, 24; Rebs: Johni Broome, 9 Asts: Tahaad Pettiford, 6

Neville Arena, Auburn, AL
Attendance: 9,121
Referees: Terry Oglesby, Bart Lenox, Byron Jarrett

=== at No. 17 Kentucky ===
ABC

March 1, 2025
12:00 p.m.

Recap

No. 1 Auburn Tigers 94, No. 17 Kentucky Wildcats 78
Scoring by half: 49–34, 45–44
Pts: Miles Kelly, 30; Rebs: Johni Broome, 6 Asts: Tahaad Pettiford, 4	Pts: Koby Brea, 21; Rebs: Amari Williams, 14; Asts: Amari Williams, 7

Rupp Arena, Lexington, KY
Attendance: 21,268
Referees: Joe Lindsay, K.B. Burdett Jr., Chuck Jones

=== at No. 22 Texas A&M ===
ESPN

March 4, 2025
8:00 p.m.

Recap

No. 1 Auburn Tigers 72, No. 22 Texas A&M Aggies 83
Scoring by half: 34–40, 38–43
Pts: Tahaad Pettiford, 19; Rebs: Johni Broome, 7 Asts: Chad Baker-Mazara, 5	Pts: Zhuric Phelps, 19; Rebs: Andersson Garcia, 11; Asts: Andersson Garcia, 5

Reed Arena, College Station, TX
Attendance: 12,257
Referees: Pat Adams, Vladimir Voyard-Tadal, Jeb Hartness

=== No. 7 Alabama ===
ESPN

March 8, 2025
1:30 p.m.

Recap

No. 7 Alabama Crimson Tide 93, No. 1 Auburn Tigers 91 (OT)
Scoring by half: 45–42, 34–37 Overtime: 14–12
Pts: Grant Nelson, 23; Rebs: Tied, 8 Asts: Mark Sears, 7	Pts: Johni Broome, 34; Rebs: Tied, 8 Asts: Tied, 6

Neville Arena, Auburn, AL
Attendance: 9,121
Referees: Doug Shows, Terry Oglesby, Byron Jarrett

=== vs Ole Miss (SEC Quarterfinal) ===
ESPN

March 14, 2025
12:00 p.m.

Recap

No. 8 Ole Miss Rebels 57, No. 1 Auburn Tigers 62
Scoring by half: 22–29, 35–33
Pts: Tied, 12; Rebs: Malik Dia, 7 Asts: Tied, 2	Pts: Johni Broome, 23; Rebs: Johni Broome, 15; Asts: Chad Baker-Mazara, 6

Bridgestone Arena, Nashville, TN
Attendance: 17,526
Referees: Pat Adams, Bart Lenox, Steven Anderson

=== vs No. 8 Tennessee (SEC Semifinal) ===
ESPN

March 15, 2025
12:00 p.m.

Recap

No. 4 Tennessee Volunteers 70, No. 1 Auburn Tigers 65
Scoring by half: 32–33, 38–32
Pts: Zakai Ziegler, 20; Rebs: Felix Okpara, 9 Asts: Zakai Ziegler, 4	Pts: Johni Broome, 23; Rebs: Johni Broome, 7 Asts: Tied, 3

Bridgestone Arena, Nashville, TN
Attendance: 19,049
Referees: Pat Adams, Don Daily, K.B. Burdett Jr.

=== vs Alabama State (NCAA First Round) ===
CBS

March 20, 2025
1:50 p.m.

Recap

No. 16 Alabama State Hornets 63, No. 1 Auburn Tigers 83
Scoring by half: 31–41, 32–42
Pts: Amarr Knox, 18; Rebs: D'Ante Bass, 9 Asts: D'Ante Bass, 2	Pts: Miles Kelly, 23; Rebs: Johni Broome, 11; Asts: Denver Jones, 6

Rupp Arena, Lexington, KY
Attendance: 18,769
Referees: Joe Lindsay, Jeff Clark, Isaac Barnett

=== vs Creighton (NCAA Second Round) ===
TBS

March 22, 2025
6:10 p.m.

Recap

No. 9 Creighton Bluejays 70, No. 1 Auburn Tigers 82
Scoring by half: 37–35, 33–47
Pts: Ryan Kalkbrenner, 18; Rebs: Ryan Kalkbrenner, 7 Asts: Steven Ashworth, 8	Pts: Tahaad Pettiford, 23; Rebs: Johni Broome, 12; Asts: Tied, 3

Rupp Arena, Lexington, KY
Attendance: 17,484
Referees: Doug Sirmons, Brent Hampton, Steven Anderson

=== vs No. 14 Michigan (NCAA Sweet Sixteen) ===
CBS

March 28, 2025
8:39 p.m.

Recap

No. 5 Michigan Wolverines 65, No. 1 Auburn Tigers 78
Scoring by half: 29–30, 36–48
Pts: Danny Wolf, 20; Rebs: Vladislav Goldin, 9 Asts: Nimari Burnett, 2	Pts: Johni Broome, 22; Rebs: Johni Broome, 16; Asts: Tied, 3

State Farm Arena, Atlanta, GA
Attendance: 16,743
Referees: Pat Adams, Tommy Morrissey, Randy Richardson

=== vs No. 8 Michigan State (NCAA Elite Eight) ===
CBS

March 30, 2025
4:05 p.m.

Recap

No. 2 Michigan State Spartans 64, No. 1 Auburn Tigers 70
Scoring by half: 24–33, 40–37
Pts: Jaxon Kohler, 17; Rebs: Jaxon Kohler, 11; Asts: Jeremy Fears Jr., 5	Pts: Johni Broome, 25; Rebs: Johni Broome, 14; Asts: Chad Baker-Mazara, 5

State Farm Arena, Atlanta, GA
Attendance: 16,768
Referees: Ron Groover, Jeff Anderson, Don Daily

=== vs No. 3 Florida (NCAA Final Four) ===
CBS

April 5, 2025
5:09 p.m.

Recap

No. 1 Florida Gators 79, No. 1 Auburn Tigers 73
Scoring by half: 38–46, 41–27
Pts: Walter Clayton Jr., 34; Rebs: Rueben Chinyelu, 9 Asts: Alex Condon, 3	Pts: Chad Baker-Mazara, 18; Rebs: Dylan Cardwell, 8 Asts: Tahaad Pettiford, 4

Alamodome, San Antonio, TX
Attendance: 68,252
Referees: Roger Ayers, Tony Padilla, Courtney Green

== Awards and honors ==
=== Regular season ===
Weekly SEC honors
Honors	Player	Position	Date awarded	Ref.
SEC Men’s Basketball Player of the Week	Johni Broome	F/C	November 11, 2024	
SEC Men’s Basketball Player of the Week	Johni Broome	F/C	December 2, 2024	
SEC Men’s Basketball Co-Player of the Week	Johni Broome	F/C	December 16, 2024	
SEC Men’s Basketball Freshman of the Week	Tahaad Pettiford	G	January 20, 2025	
SEC Men’s Basketball Player of the Week	Johni Broome	F/C	January 27, 2025	
SEC Men’s Basketball Player of the Week	Johni Broome	F/C	February 3, 2025	
SEC Men’s Basketball Player of the Week	Denver Jones	G	February 17, 2025	

=== Postseason ===
Postseason SEC honors
Honors	Honoree
SEC Coach of the Year	Bruce Pearl
SEC Player of the Year & All-SEC First Team	Johni Broome
All-SEC Third Team	Chad Baker-Mazara
SEC All-Defensive Team	Denver Jones
SEC All-Freshman Team	Tahaad Pettiford

National postseason honors
Honors	Honoree
Sporting News National Player of the Year	Johni Broome

== Rankings ==
Ranking movements Legend: ██ Increase in ranking ██ Decrease in ranking ( ) = First-place votes
	Week																				
Poll	Pre	1	2	3	4	5	6	7	8	9	10	11	12	13	14	15	16	17	18	19	Final
AP	11	5 (2)	4 (3)	4 (3)	2 (26)	2 (3)	2 (12)	2 (21)	2 (20)	2 (15)	1 (60)	1 (62)	1 (62)	1 (62)	1 (34)	1 (59)	1 (60)	1 (61)	3 (4)	4 (2)	4
Coaches	11	4 (2)	3 (2)	3 (3)	2 (12)	2 (5)	2 (9)	2 (11)	2 (11)	2 (10)	1 (25)	1 (30)	1 (31)	1 (29)	2 (16)	1 (31)	1 (28)	1 (30)	3 (2)	4 (1)	4

== See also ==
- 2024–25 Auburn Tigers women's basketball team
