= 1891 Atlantic hurricane season =

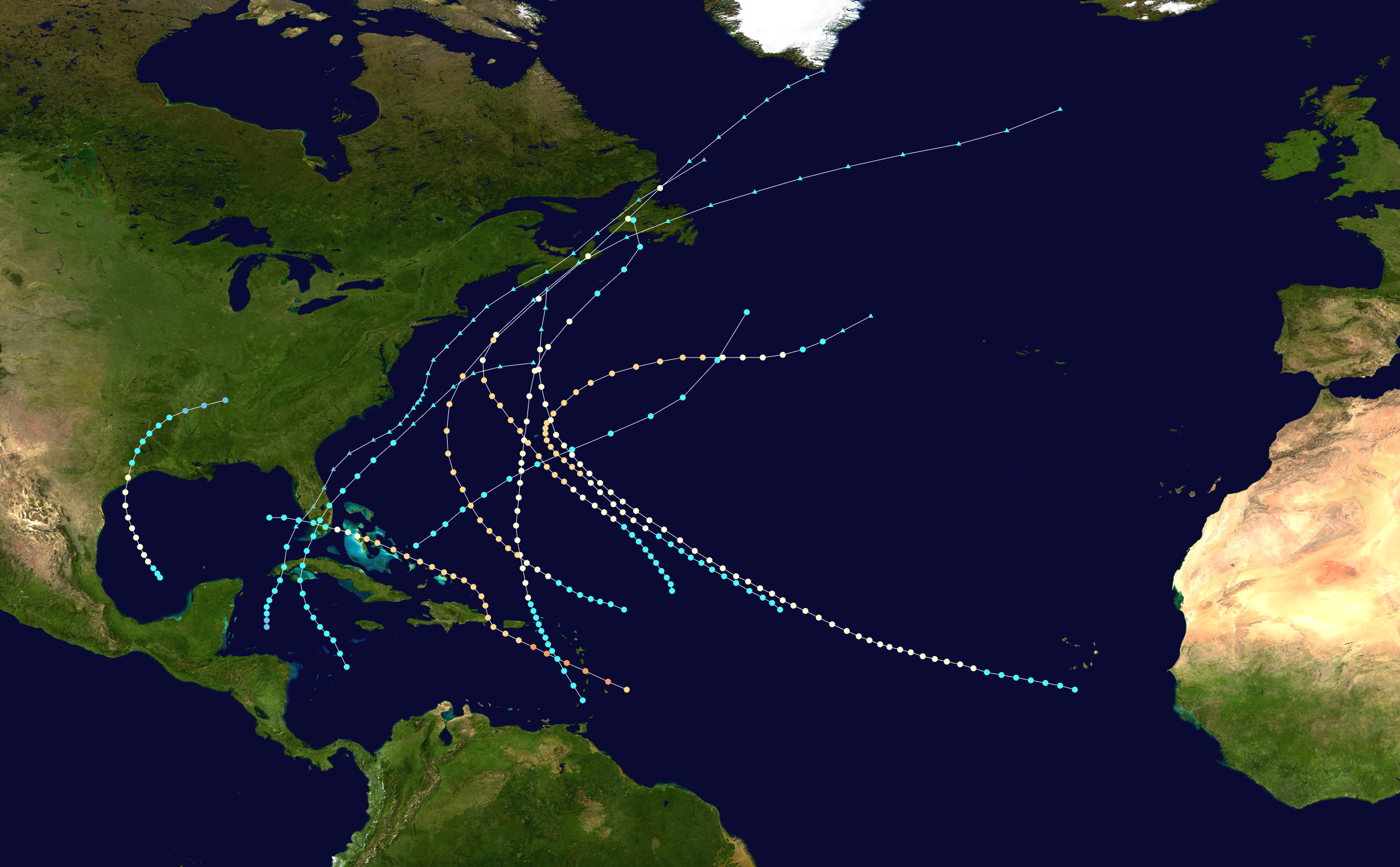
- Season summary map

Seasonal boundaries
- First system formed: July 3, 1891
- Last system dissipated: November 6, 1891

Strongest storm
- Name: "Martinique"
  - Maximum winds: 125 mph (205 km/h) (1-minute sustained)
  - Lowest pressure: 961 mbar (hPa; 28.38 inHg)

Seasonal statistics
- Total storms: 10
- Hurricanes: 7
- Major hurricanes (Cat. 3+): 1
- Total fatalities: 712+
- Total damage: $11.11 million (1891 USD)

Related article
- 1890s North Indian Ocean cyclone seasons

The 1891 Atlantic hurricane season featured the most devastating tropical cyclone to impact the French overseas territory of Martinique since the early 19th century. Overall, ten tropical storms formed, seven of which became hurricanes. Of those, one became a major hurricane. (Note: A major hurricane is a storm that ranks as Category 3 or higher on the Saffir–Simpson hurricane wind scale.) However, in the absence of modern satellite and other remote-sensing technologies, only storms that affected populated land areas or encountered ships at sea were recorded, so the actual total could be higher. Therefore, an undercount bias of zero to six tropical cyclones per year between 1851 and 1885 and zero to four per year between 1886 and 1910 has been estimated. The first system was initially observed on July 3 in the Bay of Campeche, while the tenth and final storm was last noted offshore Atlantic Canada on November 6.

Although meteorologists José Fernández-Partagás and Henry F. Diaz did not uncover any previous undocumented cyclones during their 1996 reanalysis, they revised the tracks of four of the ten cyclones. Following a 2003 review by the Atlantic hurricane reanalysis project, two storms previously considered distinct are now regarded as a single cyclone, the eighth system. The Atlantic hurricane reanalysis project also retroactively upgraded the third system to major hurricane status. More recently, a 2014 reanalysis study by climate researcher Michael Chenoweth recommended the removal of the seventh storm, also combining it with the eighth system, and the addition of four cyclones not currently listed in the Atlantic hurricane database (HURDAT). However, these proposals have not yet been approved for inclusion in HURDAT.

The most intense tropical cyclone of the season, the third system, peaked as a Category 3 hurricane on the present-day Saffir–Simpson scale with maximum sustained winds of 125 mph (205 km/h). Striking Martinique on August 18, the hurricane produced catastrophic effects on the island, with approximately $10 million (1891 USD) in damage and at least 700 deaths. (Note: All damage figures are in 1891 USD, unless otherwise noted) Later, the cyclone also killed three people offshore Grand Turk Island. In July, a hurricane that struck Texas spawned tornadoes in Mississippi and Louisiana, one of which caused 10 deaths after destroying two floors of a prison in Baton Rouge. Another hurricane in early September inflicted more than $108,000 in damage in Atlantic Canada. All other known systems impacted land to a lesser extent, aside from two deaths caused by the seventh system. Collectively, the cyclones of the 1891 season inflicted at least 712 deaths and more than $11.108 million in damage.

== Season summary ==
The Atlantic hurricane database (HURDAT) officially recognizes that ten tropical cyclones formed during the 1891 season, seven of which strengthened into a hurricane, while one of those intensified into a major hurricane. The Atlantic hurricane reanalysis project in 2003 removed one storm from the 1996 reanalysis of the season by meteorologists José Fernández-Partagás and Henry F. Diaz, combining two into a single cyclone, the eighth system. Additionally, the project upgraded the third system to a Category 3 major hurricane. However, a more recent reanalysis by climate researcher Michael Chenoweth, published in 2014, adds four storms and removes one – the seventh system – for a net gain of three cyclones, although these proposed changes have yet to be approved for inclusion in HURDAT. Chenoweth's study utilizes a more extensive collection of newspapers and ship logs, as well as late 19th century weather maps for the first time, in comparison to previous reanalysis projects.

The season's first known cyclone was initially detected over Bay of Campeche on July 3. Striking Texas as a Category 1 hurricane on the present-day Saffir–Simpson scale, the cyclone dissipated on July 8 over far northern Alabama. Two cyclones are known to have formed in August, both of which intensified into a hurricane. On August 18, the season's third cyclone peaked as a Category 3 major hurricane with maximum sustained winds of 125 mph (205 km/h) and a minimum atmospheric pressure of 961 mbar (28.4 inHg) while striking Martinique, becoming the most intense system in the Atlantic basin that year. Three systems formed in September, all of which peaked as Category 2 hurricanes with maximum sustained winds of 100 mph (155 km/h). Another three cyclones developed in October, with two tropical storms and one hurricane. In November, the season's tenth and final system developed and was last noted offshore Atlantic Canada on November 6. Overall, the cyclones of the 1891 season collectively inflicted at least 712 fatalities and over $11.108 million in damage.

The season's activity was reflected with an accumulated cyclone energy (ACE) rating of 116, tied with the following season for the fifth-highest total of the decade. ACE is a metric used to express the energy used by a tropical cyclone during its lifetime. Therefore, a storm with a longer duration will have higher values of ACE. It is only calculated at six-hour increments in which specific tropical and subtropical systems are either at or above sustained wind speeds of 39 mph (63 km/h), which is the threshold for tropical storm intensity. Thus, tropical depressions are not included here.

== Systems ==
=== Hurricane One ===
- Category 1 hurricane (SSHWS)
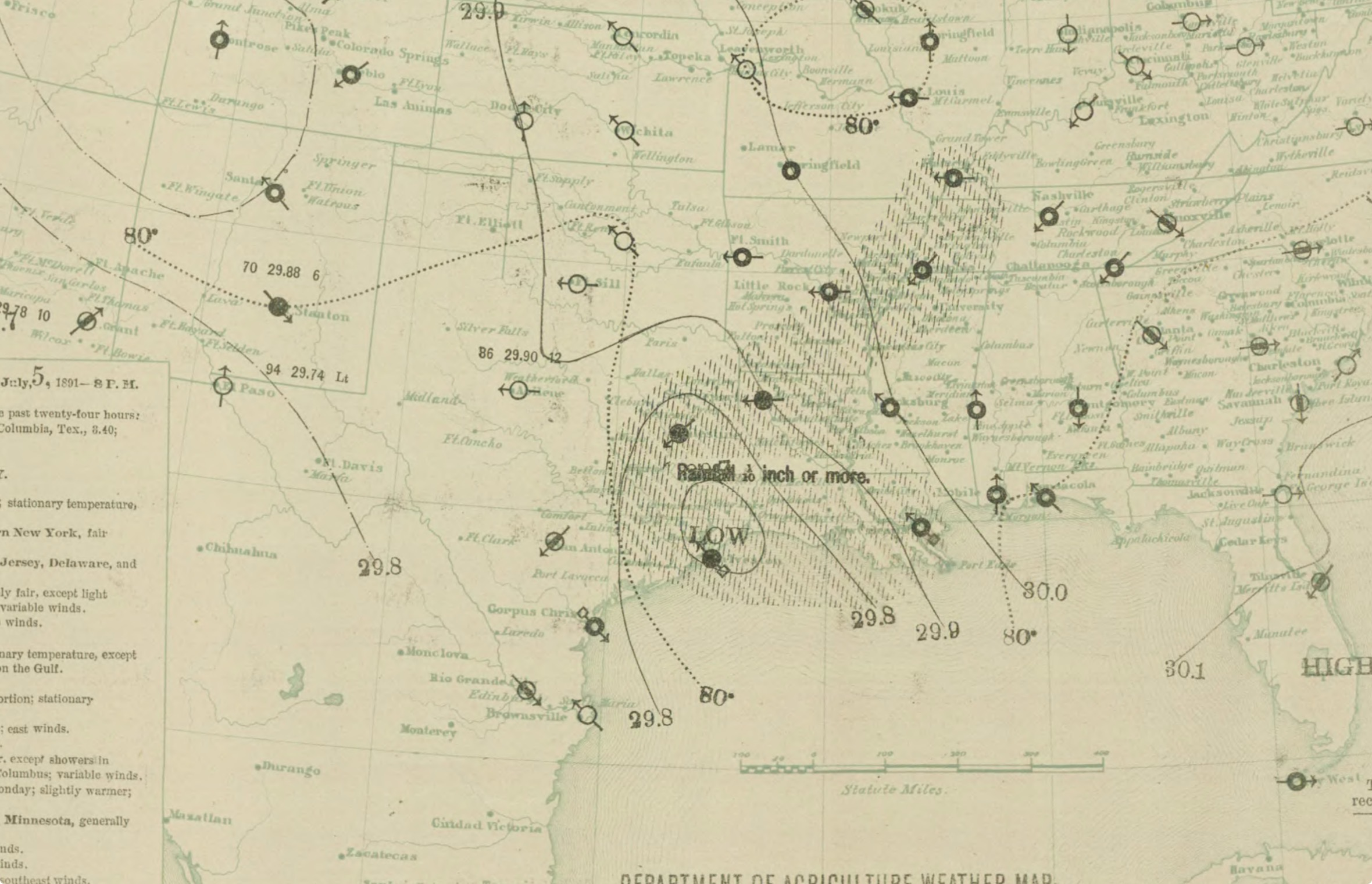
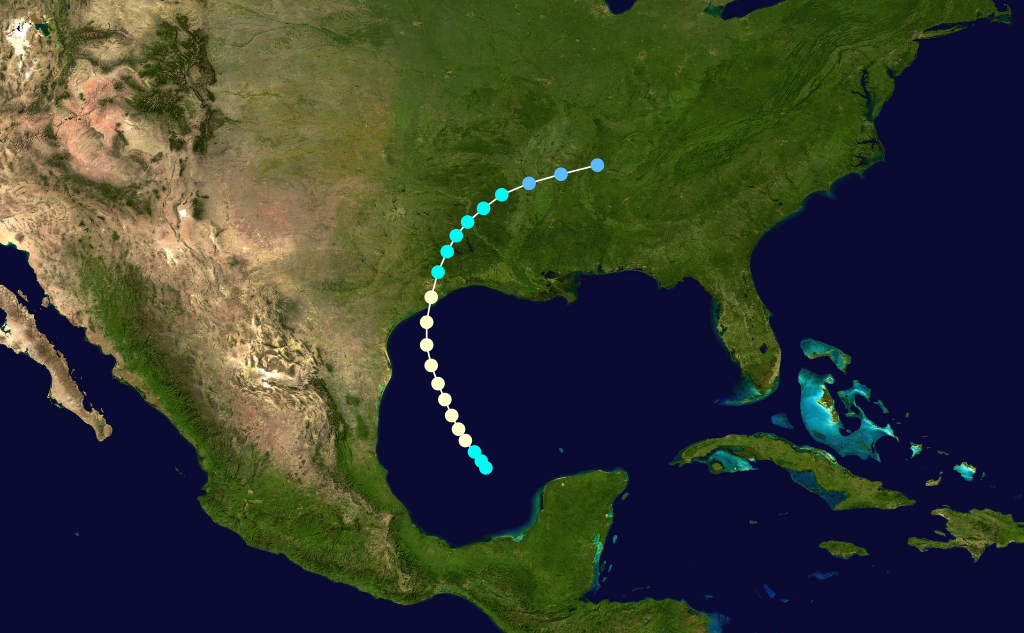
- Duration: July 3 – July 8
- Peak intensity: 90 mph (150 km/h) (1-min); 977 mbar (hPa)

Ships reported a low-pressure area in the Gulf of Mexico northwest of Campeche beginning on July 3, which is believed to have been a tropical storm. The storm moved northwestward and reached hurricane status by the following day, several hours before peaking with maximum sustained winds of 90 mph (150 km/h). Around 22:00 UTC on July 5, the hurricane made landfall near present-day Freeport, Texas. Upon the cyclone's landfall, the Atlantic hurricane reanalysis project estimated that it had a barometric pressure of 977 mbar (28.9 inHg) based on the pressure-wind relationship. The hurricane curved north-northeastward and quickly weakened to a tropical storm by early on July 6. Weakening to a tropical depression late on the following day, the system dissipated on July 8 near the Alabama-Mississippi-Tennessee state line.

Climate researcher Michael Chenoweth's 2014 study proposes that this storm formed as a tropical depression over the northwestern Gulf of Mexico on July 4. The cyclone moved very slowly toward the coast of Texas and maintained hurricane status for only 12 hours. In Texas, storm surge flooded sections of Galveston, while washing out some street car tracks and destroying part of the breakwater at the Beach Hotel. Winds and rain also left power outages in the city. Tornadoes spawned by the hurricane in Louisiana demolished one hundred homes in Baton Rouge and caused two floors of the state penitentiary to collapse, killing ten prisoners. Among the many other buildings damaged was the Louisiana Governor's Mansion, losing its roof and consequently being flooded. Another tornado was reported in Madison, Mississippi, destroying several buildings and downing many telegraph wires.

=== Hurricane Two ===
- Category 1 hurricane (SSHWS)
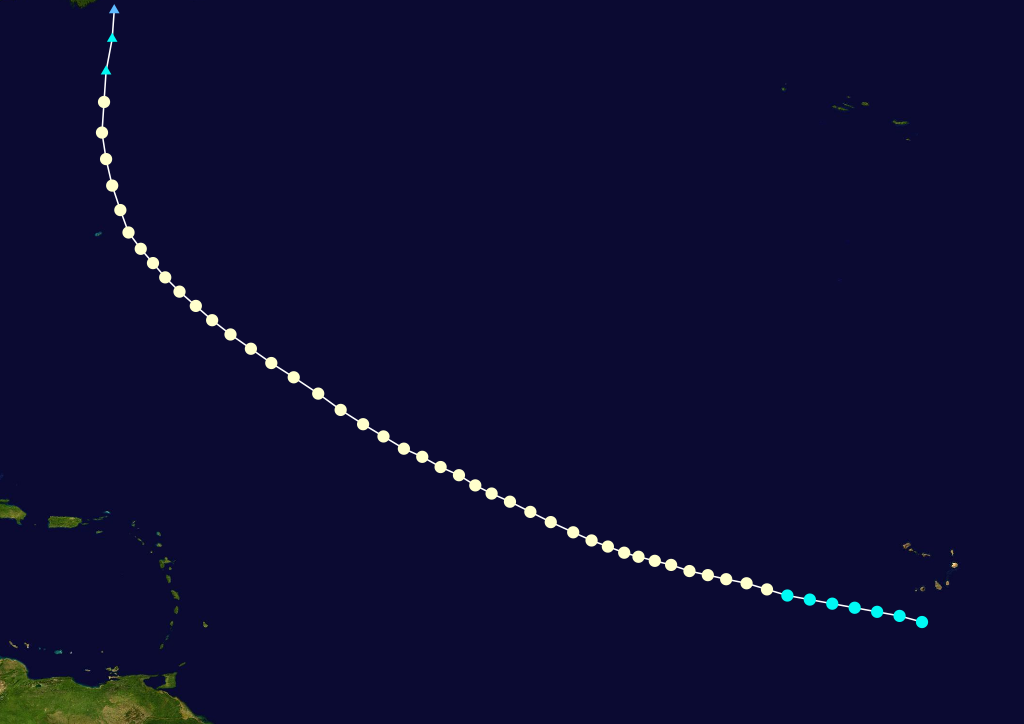
- Duration: August 17 – August 29
- Peak intensity: 75 mph (120 km/h) (1-min); ≤997 mbar (hPa)

The official track for this storm begins on August 17 to the south of the Cabo Verde Islands, based on a path created by Charles Mitchell in 1924 and reconstructed by C. J. Neumann in 1993. Although the storm was not detected prior to August 26, it likely moved west-northwestward and intensified into a hurricane on August 19. The cyclone gradually shifted to a more northwestward motion over the next several days, and on August 27, it passed just under 80 mi (130 km) east of Bermuda. Barometric pressures on the island fell to 997 mbar (29.4 inHg). This, as well as observations from the steamers Dunsmurry and La Touraine, led the Atlantic hurricane reanalysis project to conclude that the storm did not intensity beyond a minimal hurricane with winds of 75 mph (120 km/h). Considered the worst cyclone to impact Bermuda since 1880, the hurricane downed brick walls, trees, and telegraph wires. Early on August 29, the storm became extratropical about 220 mi (355 km) south-southeast of Cape Sable Island, Nova Scotia.

Chenoweth proposed a tropical depression phase to the storm's earlier stages and a more southerly track, although the system instead turned northeastward after passing Bermuda and became extratropical near Newfoundland. He also posited a peak intensity of 105 mph (165 km/h), equal to a Category 2 ranking.

=== Hurricane Three ===
- Category 3 hurricane (SSHWS)
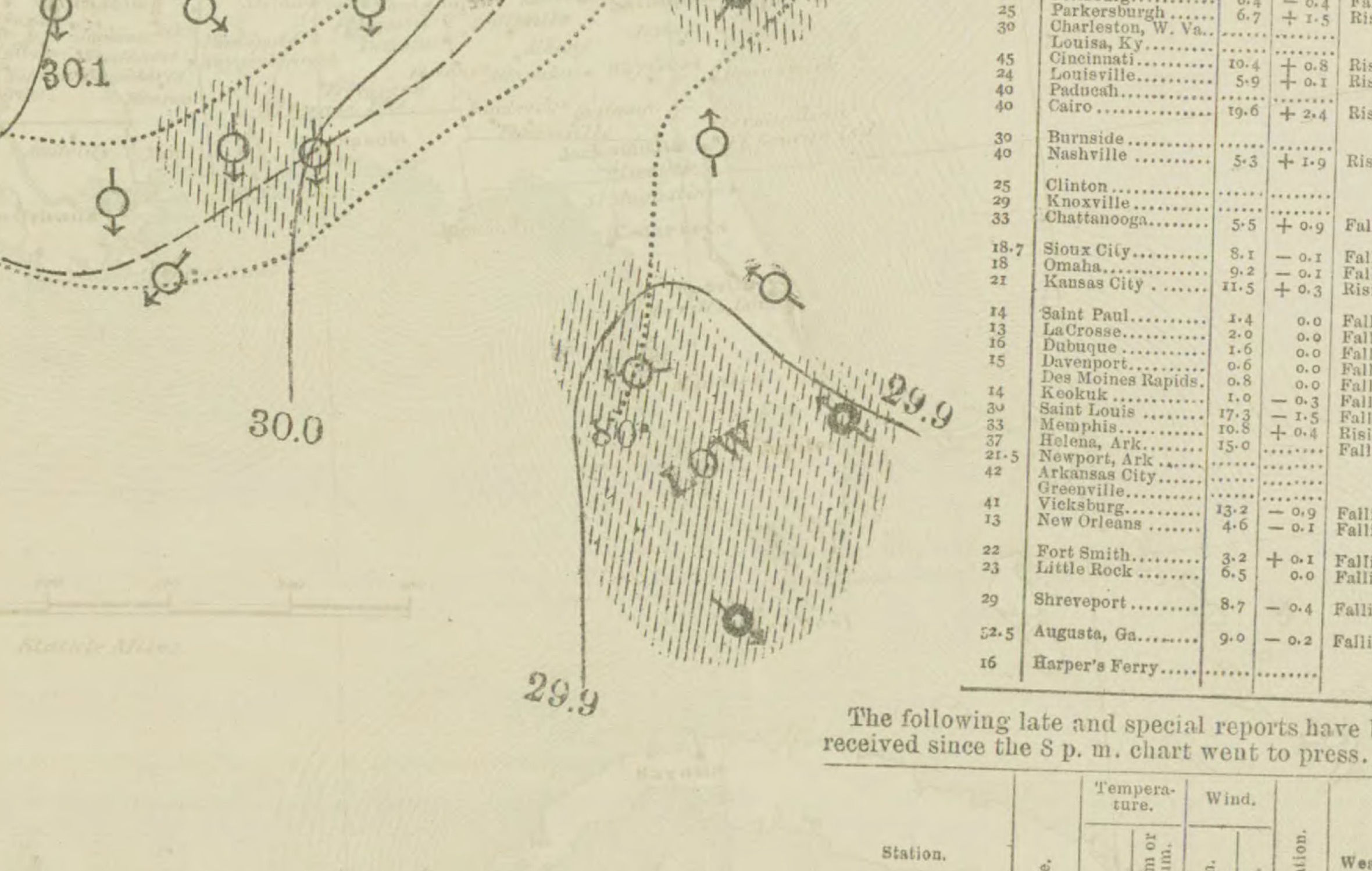
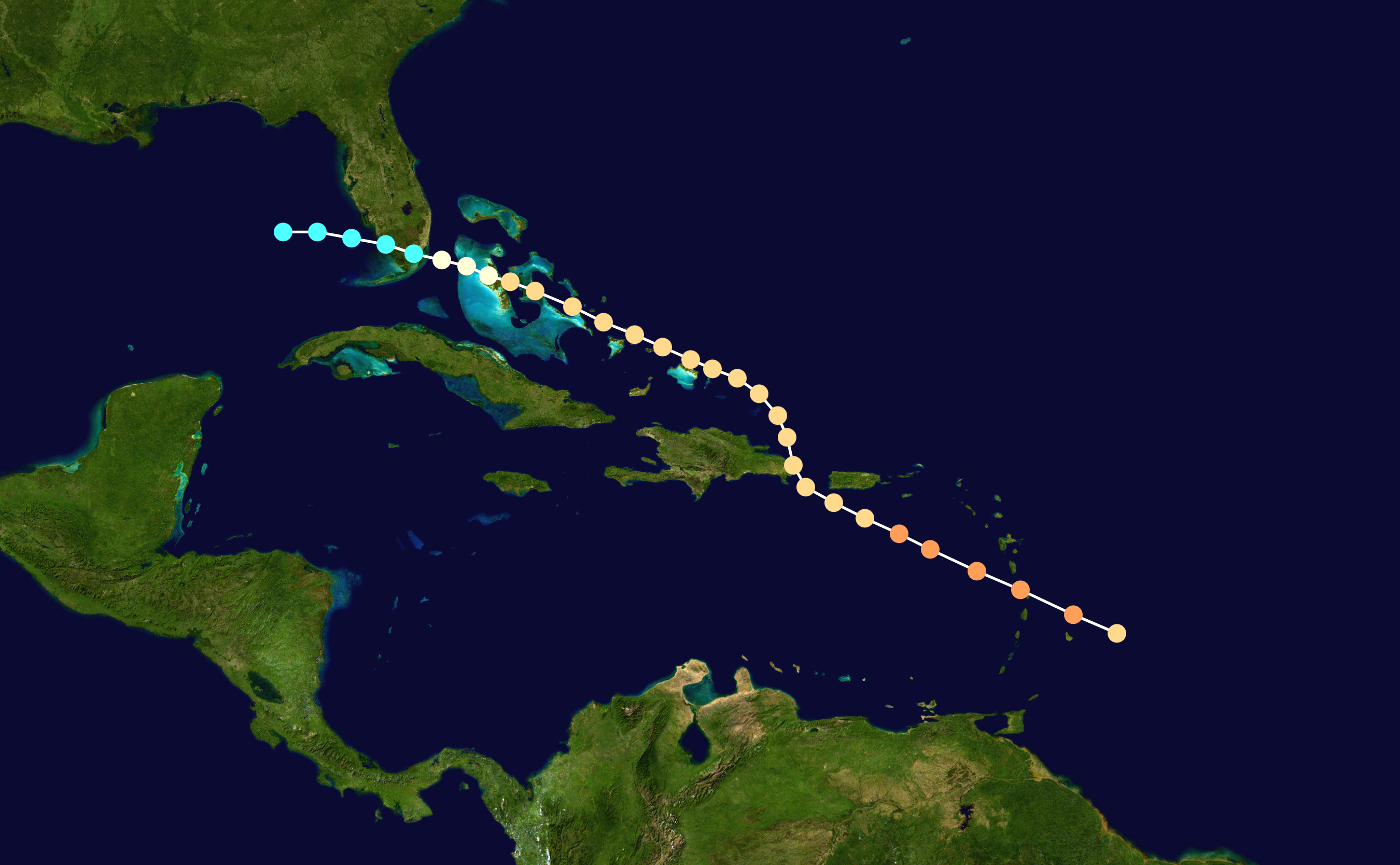
- Duration: August 18 – August 25
- Peak intensity: 125 mph (205 km/h) (1-min); 961 mbar (hPa)

A Category 2 hurricane with winds of 105 mph (170 km/h) was first seen at mid-day on August 18 about 100 mi (160 km) east of Barbados. The hurricane tracked northwestward and intensified into a major—Category 3—hurricane. Late on August 18, the cyclone struck Martinique at its peak intensity with sustained winds of 125 mph (205 km/h) and a minimum pressure of 961 mbar (28.4 inHg). The storm weakened over the northeastern Caribbean and fell to Category 2 intensity early on August 20. Several hours later, the system turned northward and brushed the extreme eastern edge of the Dominican Republic with winds of 100 mph (155 km/h). Resuming its northwestward motion on August 21, the cyclone passed north of Grand Turk early the next day. The hurricane continued to weaken while traveling northwestward through the Bahamas and passed directly over Crooked Island. On August 23, a ridge of high pressure situated off the southeast coast of the United States prevented the storm, which had weakened to a Category 1 hurricane, from curving back to the north. Instead, the cyclone struck Florida near Homestead on August 24 and subsequently moved into the Gulf of Mexico, where it dissipated on August 25.

Chenoweth's 2014 study proposes an expansion of the cyclone's track back to August 16, with the system beginning as a tropical storm. His study also argues that the storm peaked as a Category 4 hurricane while striking Martinique. Chenoweth's track mostly followed the official HURDAT track until August 22, when the cyclone instead turned westward at Crooked Island and avoided most of the Bahamas. The storm curved northwestward on August 24 and struck near the same location in Florida but as a tropical storm.

On Martinique, the storm destroyed houses, crops, and trees across the entire island. Fifty boats in harbors around Martinique were damaged or destroyed. At Ducos, only four homes remained following the storm, and at St. Pierre, at least 34 people lost their lives. At Fort de France, twelve people were killed. A military camp at Balata was destroyed, with a number of soldiers there sustaining injuries from airborne debris. Property damage across the island reached approximately $10 million. In total, the hurricane killed approximately 700 people on Martinique. Puerto Rico observed heavy rainfall and hurricane-force wind gusts. The Humacao River overflowed, inundating the city. Waterways between Cabo Rojo and Hormigueros also exceeded their banks, flooding many low-lying areas and sweeping animals away. The steamship Ozama reported hundreds of downed fruit trees and numerous damaged homes in the Dominican Republic. The storm drowned three people on Grand Turk and damaged some small homes and vessels. In South Florida, the cyclone also produced hurricane-force winds that blew boats ashore near present-day Cutler.

=== Hurricane Four ===
- Category 2 hurricane (SSHWS)
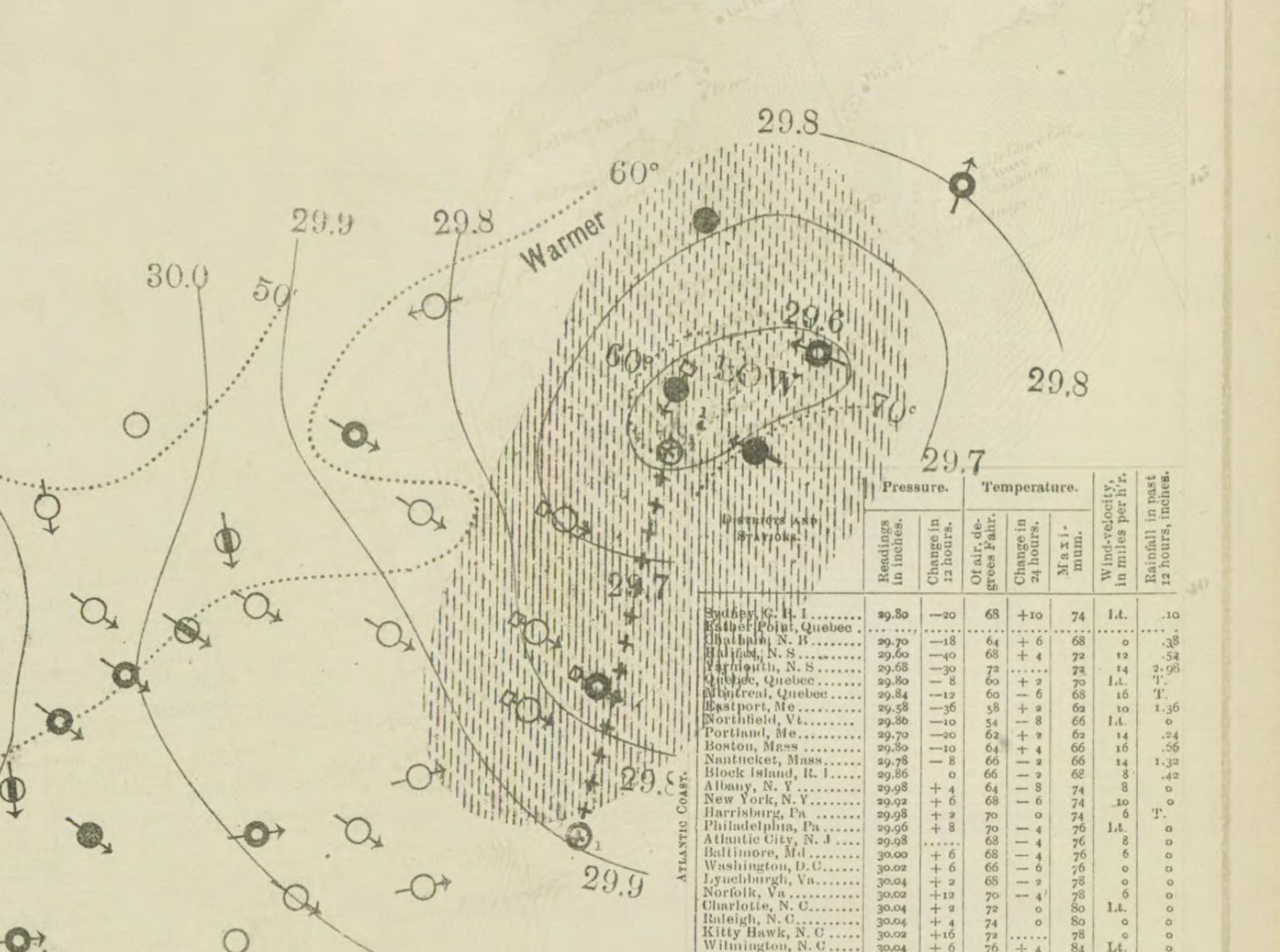
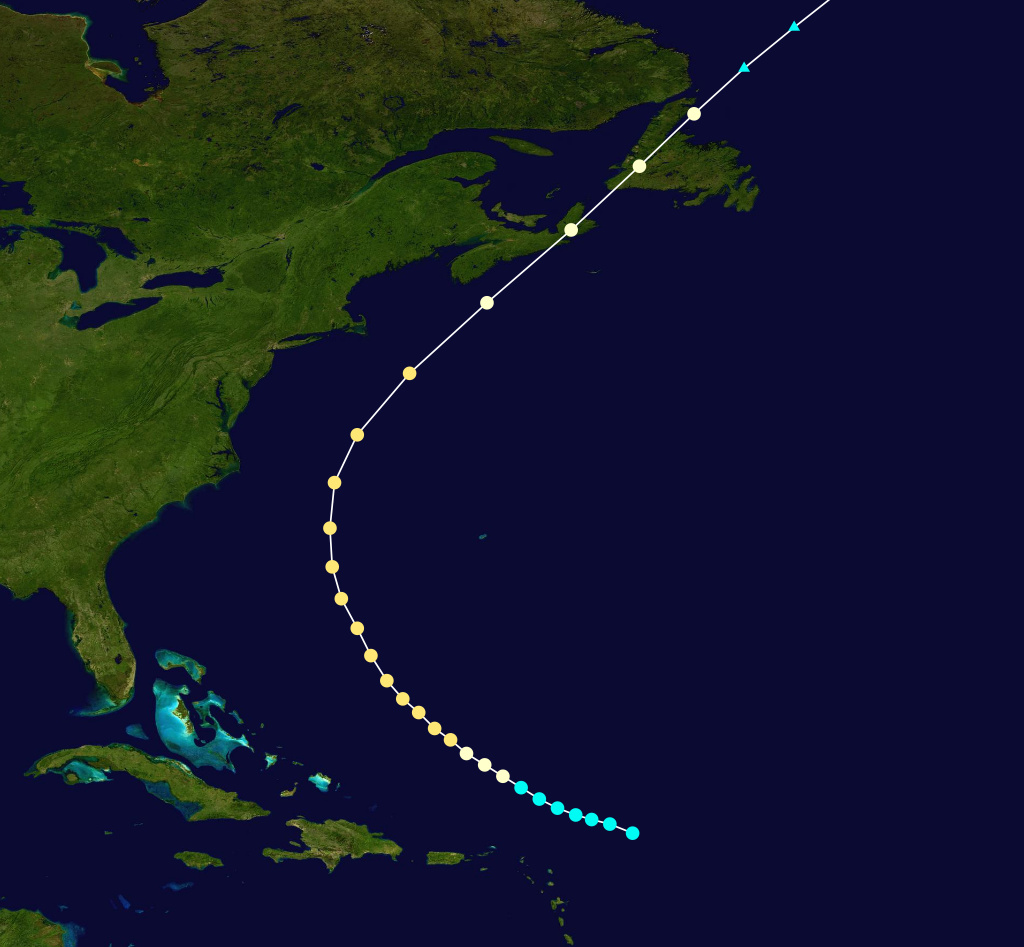
- Duration: September 2 – September 8
- Peak intensity: 100 mph (155 km/h) (1-min);

Based on a 1993 reanalysis by meteorologist C. J. Neumann, the official Atlantic hurricane database begins the track of this system as a tropical storm approximately 260 mi (420 km) northeast of the Leeward Islands on September 2. It moved northwestward for the next few days and intensified, reaching hurricane status on September 4, shortly before becoming a Category 2 hurricane that day. Peaking with maximum sustained winds of 100 mph (155 km/h), the hurricane turned northward on September 6 and then northeastward on September 7. By early the following day, the system made landfall near Canso, Nova Scotia, and later near Channel-Port aux Basques, Newfoundland, as a Category 1 hurricane at both locations. Late on September 8, while located east of Labrador, the storm transitioned into an extratropical cyclone, which dissipated near the southern tip of Greenland on September 10.

Chenoweth extended its track back to a position southeast of the Cabo Verde Islands, depicting genesis on August 27. However, the study also indicates that the cyclone did not intensify into a hurricane until September 6.

The cyclone brought heavy rain to parts of New England. When the hurricane struck Nova Scotia and Newfoundland, it destroyed a number of small vessels, as well as some larger ones. In Nova Scotia, the storm was compared to a hurricane in 1873. Observed sustained winds reached 60 mph (97 km/h), causing "great destruction to crops, shipping, and buildings", according to The Huddersfield Daily Chronicle. Damage to fruit crops totaled nearly $58,000. The storm also partly dismantled a grain elevator and several small bridges, while about two-thirds of a larger railroad bridge linking Halifax and Dartmouth collapsed, causing more than $50,000 in damage. Rough seas beached a few schooners and several Royal Nova Scotia Yacht Squadron vessels in the Halifax area, while hundreds of other small watercraft suffered some degree of damage. Farther east, several other vessels wrecked at Cape Breton Island.

=== Hurricane Five ===
- Category 2 hurricane (SSHWS)
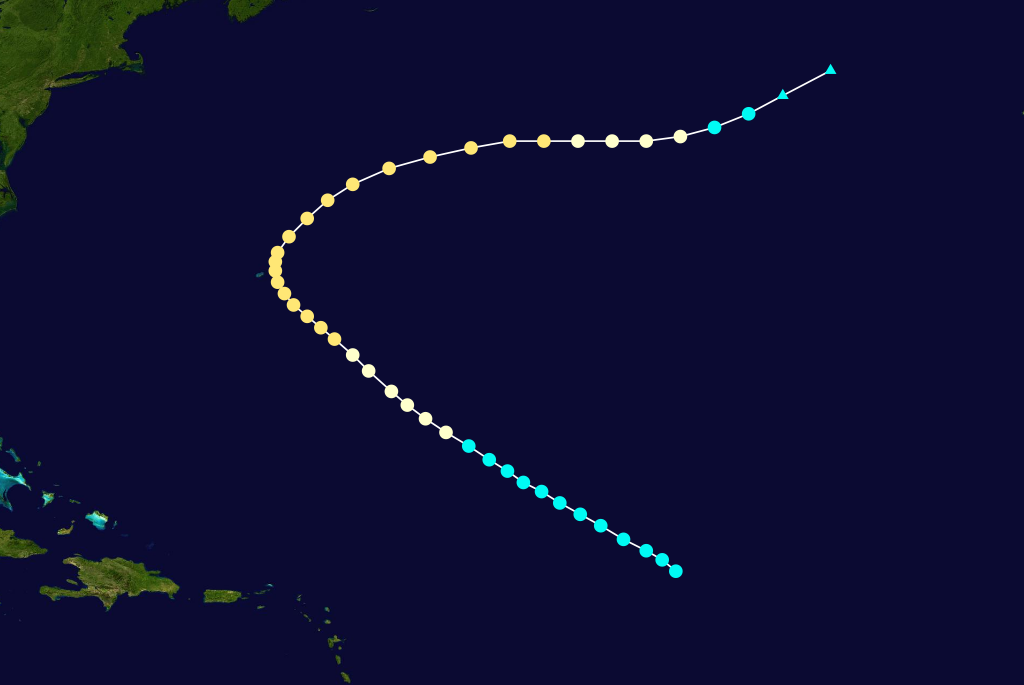
- Duration: September 16 – September 26
- Peak intensity: 100 mph (155 km/h) (1-min); ≤980 mbar (hPa)

On September 16, the track for this storm begins near 19°N 47°W, over the open Atlantic well east of the Leeward Islands, based on a path constructed by Charles Mitchell in 1924. Moving northwestward, the cyclone became a hurricane on September 19. Between late on September 21 and early on September 22, the hurricane passed about 45 mi (70 km) east of Bermuda. A barometric pressure of 980 mbar (29 inHg) was observed on the island, leading the Atlantic hurricane reanalysis project to estimate that the storm peaked as a Category 2 hurricane with winds of 100 mph (155 km/h). On Bermuda, the storm severely damaged trees and telephone and telegraph wires, while a ship sank along the coast. Later on September 22, the cyclone turned northeastward and then eastward by September 25, remaining well offshore any other landmasses. Early the next day, the system weakened to a tropical storm, several hours before becoming extratropical about 560 mi (900 km) west of Flores Island in the Azores. Chenoweth began the storm slightly earlier, on September 15, and concluded that the cyclone became a hurricane late on September 16, but proposed few other changes.

=== Hurricane Six ===
- Category 2 hurricane (SSHWS)
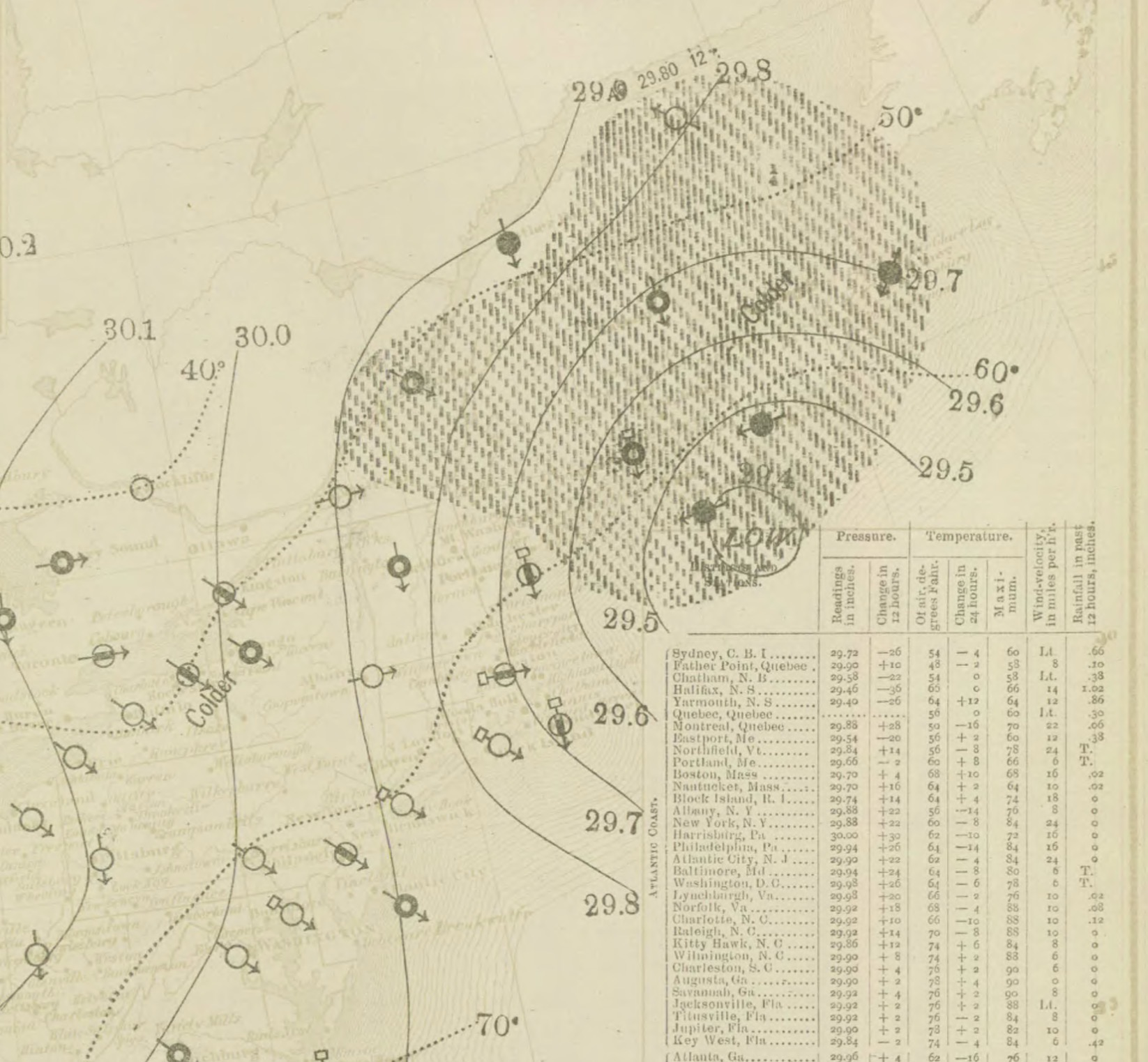
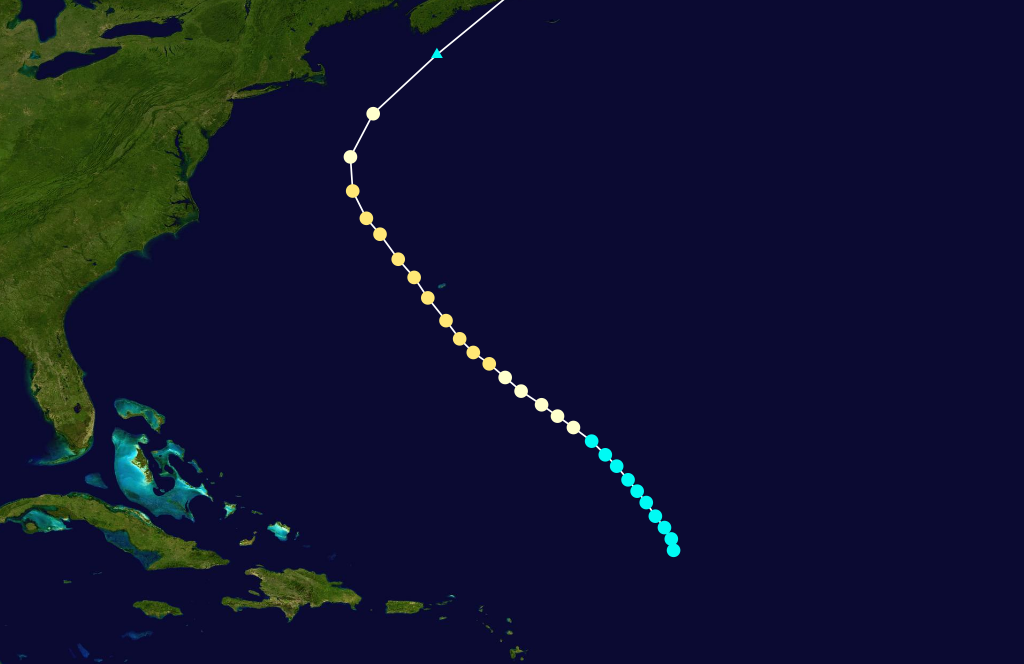
- Duration: September 29 – October 5
- Peak intensity: 100 mph (155 km/h) (1-min); ≤981 mbar (hPa)

With Mitchell noting in 1924 that this storm was first observed on September 29, the official track begins about 500 mi (805 km) northeast of the Leeward Islands. Moving northwestward for most of its duration, the storm strengthened into a hurricane on October 1 and a Category 2 hurricane on October 3. Early the next day, the cyclone passed about 45 mi (70 km) southwest of Bermuda, which observed a barometric pressure of 981 mbar (29.0 inHg). This formed the basis for the system's retroactive designation as a Category 2 hurricane with sustained winds of 100 mph (155 km/h). On October 5, the storm curved northeastward and transitioned into an extratropical cyclone about 75 mi (120 km) southeast of the southern tip of Nova Scotia. The extratropical cyclone crossed Atlantic Canada and persisted until dissipating about halfway between Greenland and the British Isles on October 8. Chenoweth's 2014 study develops a tropical depression southwest of the Cabo Verde Islands on September 23, reaching tropical storm status on the following day and hurricane status on September 25.

=== Tropical Storm Seven ===
- Tropical storm (SSHWS)
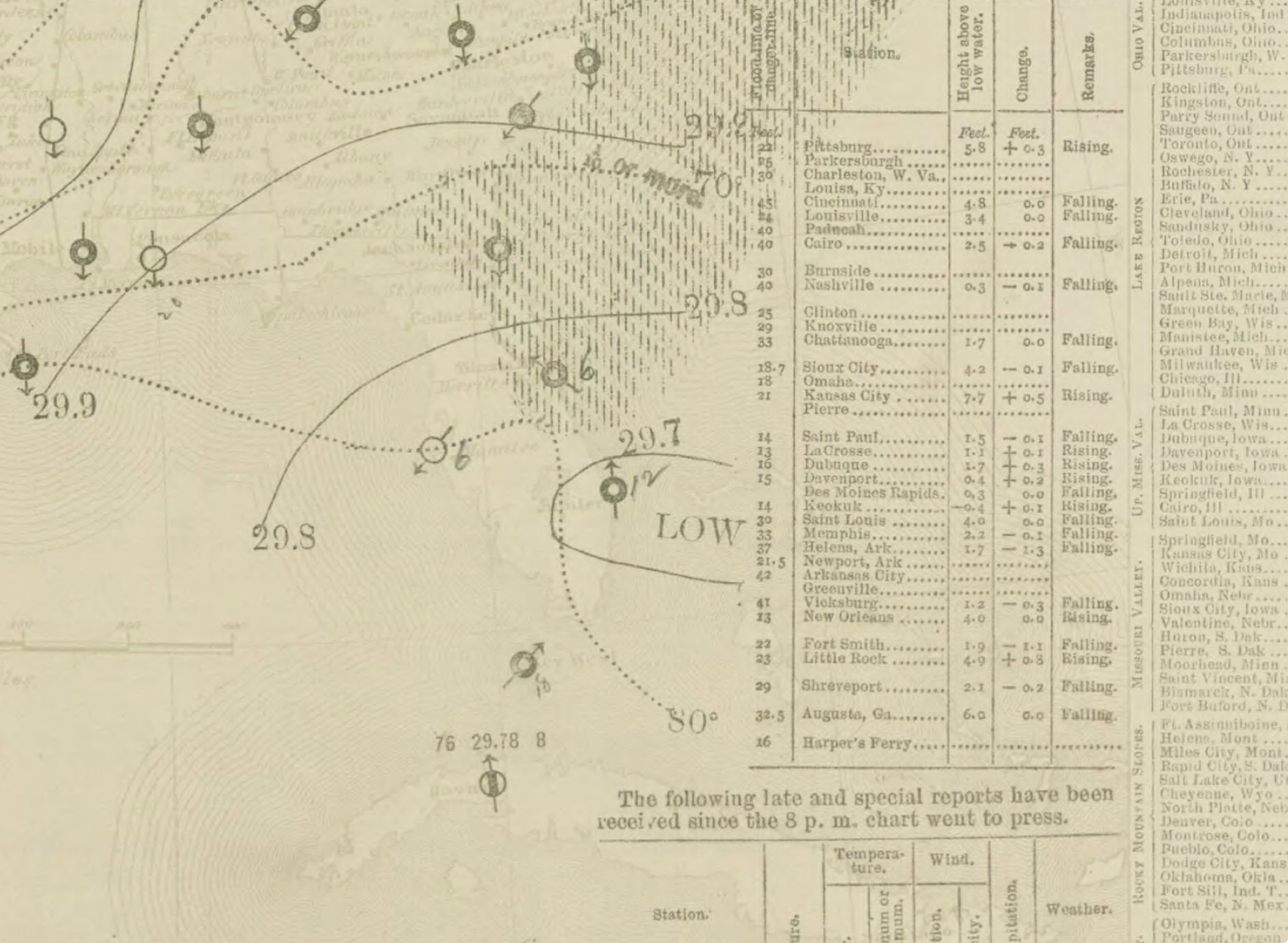
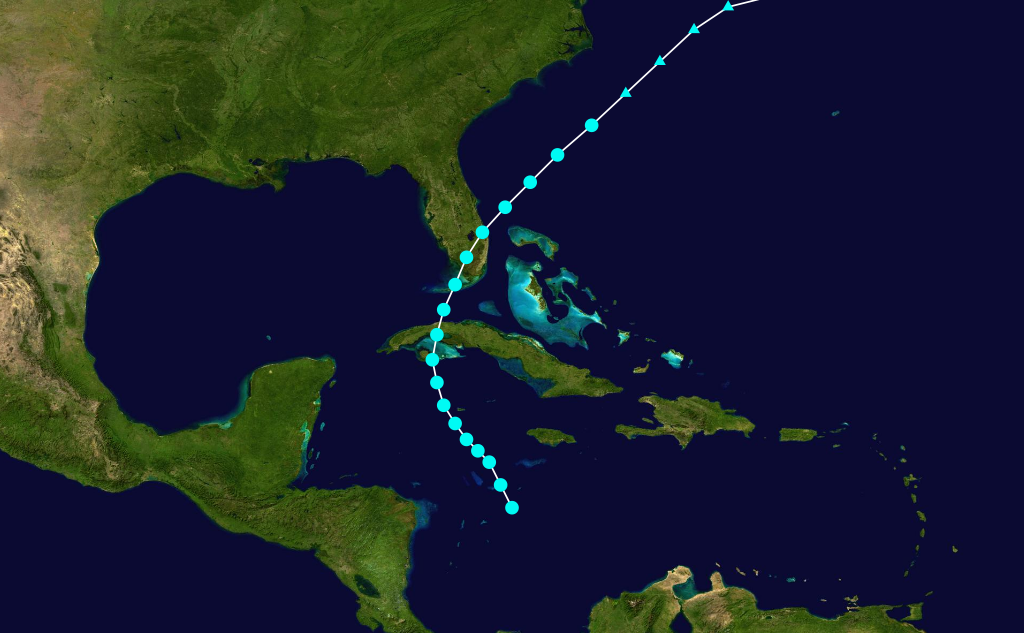
- Duration: October 4 – October 8
- Peak intensity: 50 mph (85 km/h) (1-min); 1004 mbar (hPa)

A moderate tropical storm formed in the Caribbean south of Jamaica on October 4 and passed to the west of both Jamaica and the Cayman Islands. The cyclone then passed near or over Isla de la Juventud shortly before making landfall near Surgidero de Batabanó in present-day Mayabeque Province on October 6. Entering the Straits of Florida several hours later in a northeastward direction, the storm crossed the Florida Keys early the next day and made landfall near Cape Sable with winds of 50 mph (85 km/h). As the cyclone exited the east coast of Florida near present-day Stuart late on October 7, Jupiter observed a barometric pressure of 1,004 mbar (29.6 inHg). Late the next day, the storm transitioned into an extratropical cyclone about 175 mi (280 km) southeast of Cape Lookout, North Carolina. The extratropical storm moved northeastward until dissipating about halfway between Bermuda and Nova Scotia on October 10.

The storm drove some vessels on the coast of Cuba ashore, and two people drowned in flooding on the island. Climate researcher Michael Chenoweth proposed the removal of this storm from HURDAT, concluding that "bad data" led to inclusion in the database and that the cyclone was actually part of the eighth storm.

=== Tropical Storm Eight ===
- Tropical storm (SSHWS)
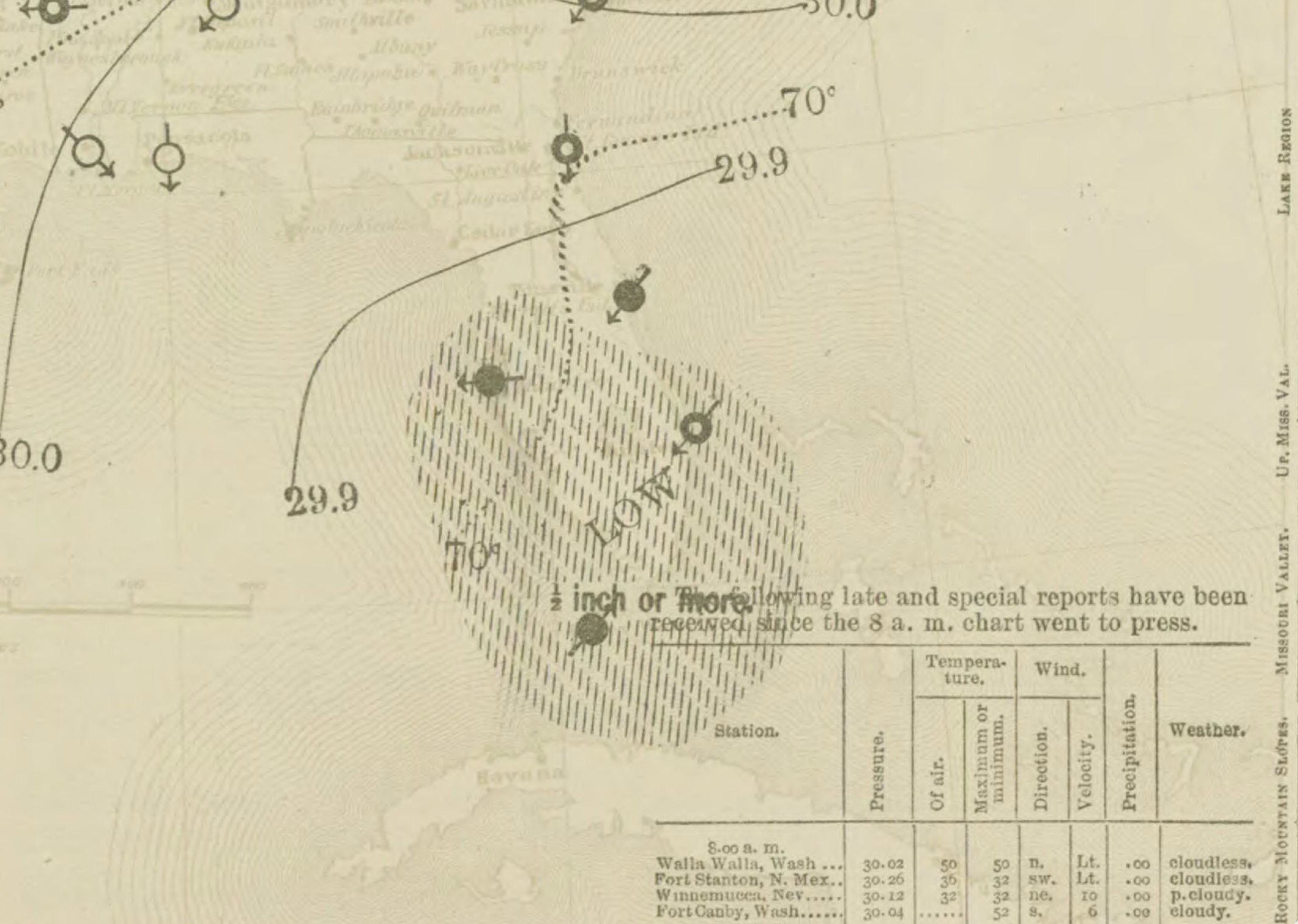
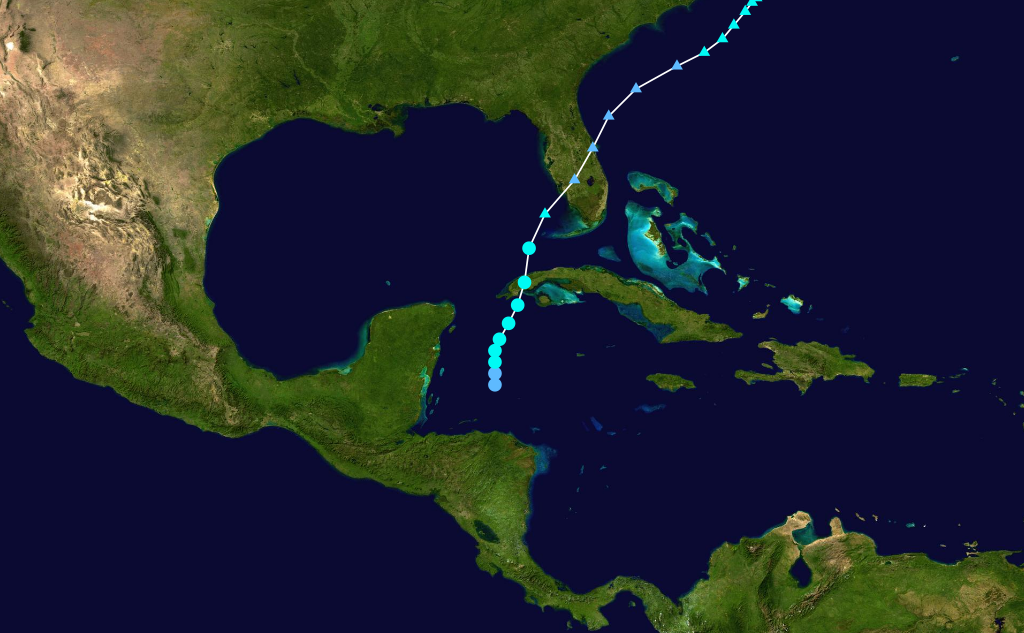
- Duration: October 7 – October 9
- Peak intensity: 45 mph (75 km/h) (1-min); ≤1004 mbar (hPa)

A tropical depression formed north of Honduras on October 7. Based on a ship recording a barometric pressure of 1,004 mbar (29.6 inHg) late on that day, the system strengthened into a tropical storm early on October 8. The storm then made landfall in Cuba on the following day near Boca de Galafre, Pinar del Río Province. Slight further intensification likely occurred, with the cyclone peaking with winds of 50 mph (85 km/h) as it reached the southeastern Gulf of Mexico. However, the system became extratropical late on October 9 about 75 mi (120 km) southwest of Naples, Florida. The extratropical storm crossed Florida on October 10. Thereafter, the remnants moved slowly northeastward off the East Coast of the United States before accelerating over Atlantic Canada and dissipating offshore Labrador on October 16.

Although Chenoweth's study keeps this storm mostly over the western Caribbean, he proposes major changes to the system's path and intensity. According to his study, the cyclone formed near the coast of Nicaragua on October 7 and significantly intensified, peaking as a Category 4 hurricane prior to striking the Yucatán Peninsula on October 11. The storm then turned southwestward and dissipated on October 15 over Tabasco.

=== Hurricane Nine ===
- Category 1 hurricane (SSHWS)
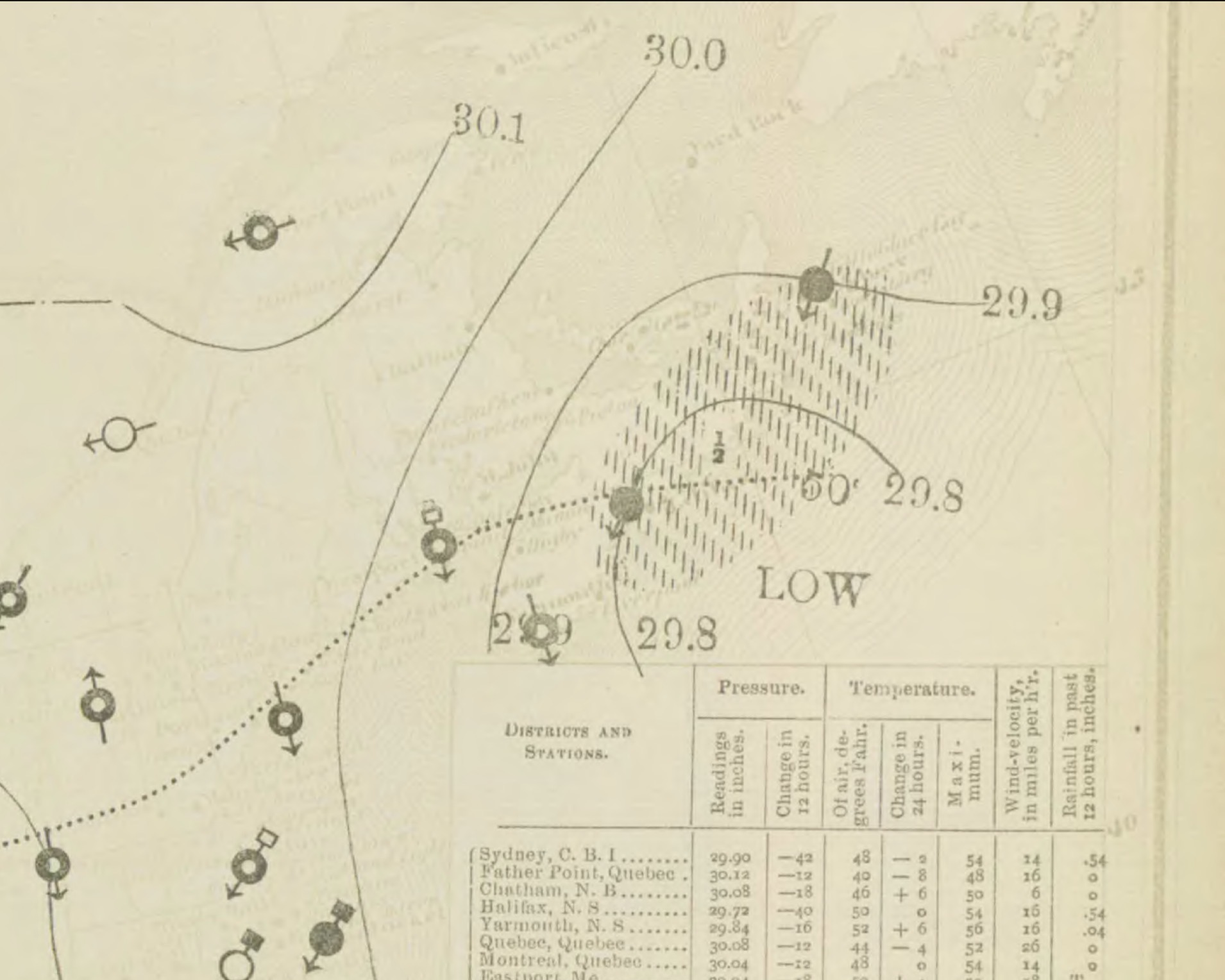
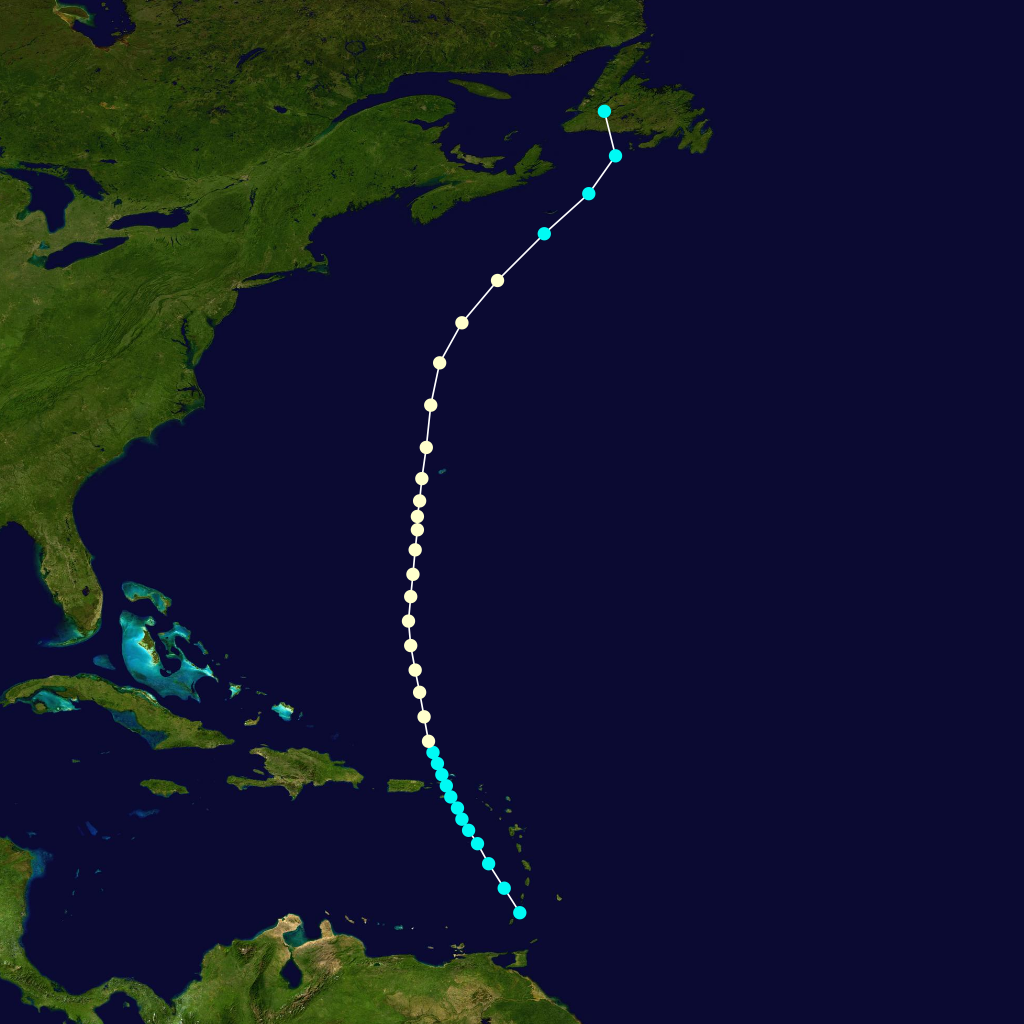
- Duration: October 12 – October 20
- Peak intensity: 85 mph (140 km/h) (1-min); ≤992 mbar (hPa)

On October 12, a tropical storm was first observed just east of the Grenadines. Moving northwestward over the Caribbean, the cyclone struck Saint Croix and the main Virgin Islands on October 14. While passing north of Puerto Rico on the following day, the hurricane intensified into a hurricane, based on ships recording hurricane-force winds east-northeast of the Bahamas. Moving generally northward, the storm passed just west of Bermuda on October 18. The island recorded a barometric pressure of 992 mbar (29.3 inHg), which formed the basis of the hurricane's estimated maximum sustained wind speed of 85 mph (140 km/h). Turning northeastward on October 19, the cyclone weakened to a tropical storm on the following day. Late on October 20, the storm made landfall on the south coast of Newfoundland and soon dissipated.

Chenoweth's study proposed that this system did not form until October 14 near Saint Croix. Initially a tropical depression, the storm moved generally northward, intensifying into a tropical storm on October 16 and a hurricane on the following day. Chenoweth also argued that the cyclone struck Bermuda on October 18 and then curved northeastward, avoiding landfall in Newfoundland.

=== Tropical Storm Ten ===
- Tropical storm (SSHWS)
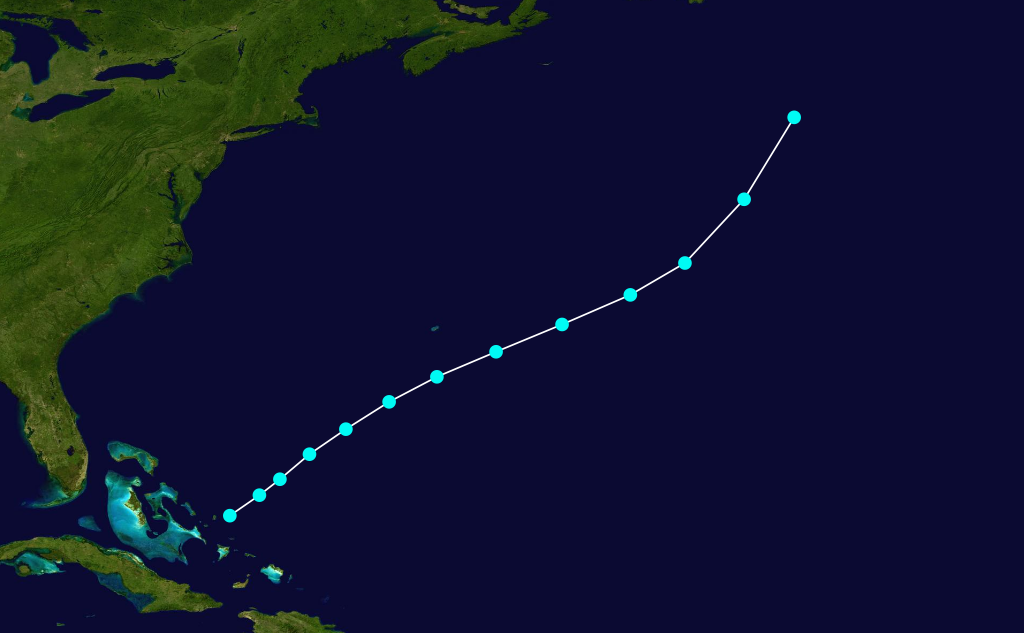
- Duration: November 3 – November 6
- Peak intensity: 60 mph (95 km/h) (1-min);

Although the Monthly Weather Review reported "an ill-defined cyclonic area" south of Cuba on November 3, the official track for this storm instead begins about 40 mi (65 km) east of San Salvador Island in the Bahamas, based on Mitchell's 1924 reanalysis and other available evidence. Tracking generally northwestward, the cyclone likely peaked as a moderate tropical storm with maximum sustained winds of 60 mph (95 km/h), due to a lack of observations suggesting hurricane intensity. After turning north-northeastward on November 6, the storm was last noted several hours later about 400 mi (645 km) southeast of Cape Race, Newfoundland. In Chenoweth's 2014 study, he concluded that the storm did not form until November 4, when it was farther away from the Bahamas. The system became stronger than officially indicated in HURDAT, reaching hurricane on November 5, about 24 hours before transitioning into an extratropical cyclone.

=== Other storms ===
Chenoweth proposed four other storms not currently listed in HURDAT. The first such system formed over the Yucatán Channel on September 19. Moving generally northwestward and then northeastward over the Gulf of Mexico by September 21, the storm struck Louisiana and Mississippi. Several hours later, the cyclone dissipated over Choctaw County, Alabama. Chenoweth concluded that another tropical storm existed over the northwestern Caribbean by October 14. Tracking to the west, the cyclone made landfall in British Honduras (modern day Belize) two days later and crossed into Guatemala shortly before dissipating. Another unofficial storm formed over the southwestern Caribbean on October 23. The storm moved west-northwestward across far northeastern Nicaragua and northeastern Honduras before emerging into the Gulf of Honduras. Thereafter, the cyclone approached British Honduras but then turned northeastward near Glover's Reef. Chenoweth's study last notes the system approaching central Cuba on October 29. The final unofficial storm developed over the southwestern Caribbean on November 1. It moved west-northwestward and struck Nicaragua the next day, several hours before dissipating.

== Season effects ==
This is a table of all of the known storms that have formed in the 1891 Atlantic hurricane season. It includes their duration, landfall, damages, and death totals. Deaths in parentheses are additional and indirect (an example of an indirect death would be a traffic accident), but were still related to that storm. Damage and deaths include totals while the storm was extratropical, a wave, or a low, and all of the damage figures are in 1891 USD.

Saffir–Simpson scale
| TD | TS | C1 | C2 | C3 | C4 | C5 |

1891 North Atlantic tropical cyclone season statistics
| Storm name | Dates active | Storm category at peak intensity | Max 1-min wind mph (km/h) | Min. press. (mbar) | Areas affected | Damage (US$) | Deaths | Ref(s). |
|---|---|---|---|---|---|---|---|---|
| One | July 3–8 | Tropical storm | 90 (150) | 977 | Gulf Coast of the United States (Texas) | Unknown | 10 | |
| Two | August 17–29 | Category 1 hurricane | 75 (120) | 997 | Cabo Verde Islands, Bermuda | Unknown | None | |
| Three | August 18–25 | Category 3 hurricane | 125 (205) | 961 | Lesser Antilles (Martinique), Dominican Republic, Turks and Caicos Islands, Bahamas, Florida | $10 million | >700 | |
| Four | September 2–8 | Category 2 hurricane | 100 (155) | 981 | Atlantic Canada (Nova Scotia and Newfoundland) | >$108,000 | None | |
| Five | September 16–26 | Category 2 hurricane | 100 (155) | 980 | Bermuda | Unknown | None | |
| Six | September 29 – October 5 | Category 2 hurricane | 100 (155) | 981 | Bermuda, Atlantic Canada | Unknown | None | |
| Seven | October 4–8 | Tropical storm | 50 (85) | 1004 | Cuba, Florida, Atlantic Canada | Unknown | 2 | |
| Eight | October 7–9 | Tropical storm | 45 (75) | 1004 | Cuba, East Coast of the United States (Florida) | Unknown | None | |
| Nine | October 12–20 | Category 1 hurricane | 85 (140) | 992 | Lesser Antilles (Virgin Islands), Bermuda, Atlantic Canada (Newfoundland) | Unknown | None | |
| Ten | November 3–6 | Tropical storm | 60 (95) | Unknown | Bahamas, Bermuda | Unknown | None | |
Season aggregates
| 10 systems | July 3 – November 6 | | 125 (205) | 961 | | >$11.108 million | 712 | |

== See also ==
- Atlantic hurricane reanalysis project
- Tropical cyclone observation
