= List of botanical gardens and arboretums in Mississippi =

This list of botanical gardens and arboretums in Mississippi is intended to include all significant botanical gardens and arboretums in the U.S. state of Mississippi

Name	Image	Affiliation	City
Crosby Arboretum		Mississippi State University	Picayune
Forestry Sciences Laboratory Arboretum		Mississippi State University	Starkville
Jackson State University Botanical Garden		Jackson State University	Jackson
Simmons Arboretum			Madison

== See also ==
- List of botanical gardens and arboretums in the United States
