= 1891 Martinique hurricane =

Category 3 Atlantic hurricane

Hurricane Three
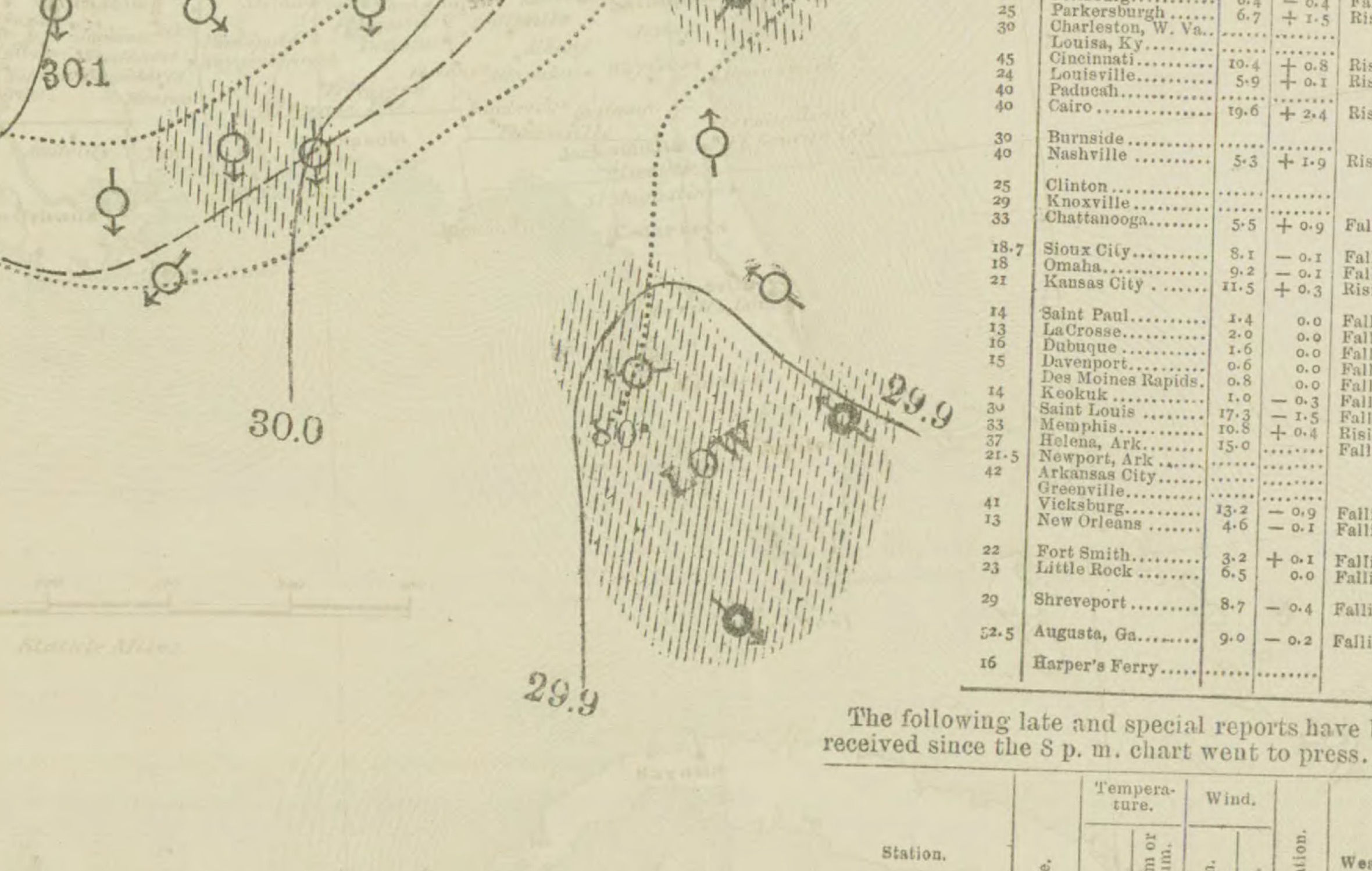
- Weather map of the hurricane shortly after landfall in Southern Florida on August 24

Meteorological history
- Formed: August 18, 1891
- Dissipated: August 25, 1891

Category 3 major hurricane
- 1-minute sustained (SSHWS/NWS)
- Highest winds: 125 mph (205 km/h)
- Lowest pressure: 961 mbar (hPa); 28.38 inHg

Overall effects
- Fatalities: >700
- Damage: $10 million (1891 USD)
- Areas affected: Lesser Antilles, Puerto Rico, The Bahamas
- IBTrACS
- Part of the 1891 Atlantic hurricane season

The 1891 Martinique hurricane, also known as Hurricane San Magín, was an intense major hurricane that struck the island of Martinique and caused massive damage. The third known hurricane and only major hurricane of 1891 Atlantic hurricane season, this cyclone was first sighted east of the Lesser Antilles on August 18 as a Category 2 hurricane on the present-day Saffir–Simpson scale. Intensification occurred as the storm moved northwestward, striking Martinique later that day as a Category 3 hurricane with maximum sustained winds of 125 mph (205 km/h). On August 20, the cyclone briefly turned northward over the Caribbean Sea and brushed the eastern Dominican Republic while re-emerging into the Atlantic Ocean. The storm then moved west-northwestward across the Bahamas before making landfall near Homestead, Florida, on August 24. Dissipation is estimated to have occurred on the following day after the cyclone reached the east-central Gulf of Mexico.

Considered the worst storm on Martinique since 1817, the hurricane obliterated homes, trees, and crops – especially coffee, cotton, and sugar – throughout the island. Communications between the capital city of Fort-de-France and other communities experienced significant disruption, while the cyclone reportedly wrecked all vessels on Martinique. Overall, damage on the island totaled approximately $10 million (1891 USD), while more than 700 people were killed and at least 1,000 others injured. Mostly minor impacts occurred on Dominica, Guadeloupe, Saint Croix, and Saint Lucia, although one death occurred along the coast of Saint Croix. Portions of Puerto Rico reported heavy rainfall, elevating waterways and flooding several towns. Reports from a steamship noted hundreds of downed fruit trees and numerous damaged homes in the Dominican Republic. When the hurricane passed north of Grand Turk, three people drowned on the island, and there was some damage to small houses and shipping vessels. In Florida, the storm beached boats near Cutler, though due to lack of observations near the landfall location its impact in the state is largely unknown.

== Meteorological history ==
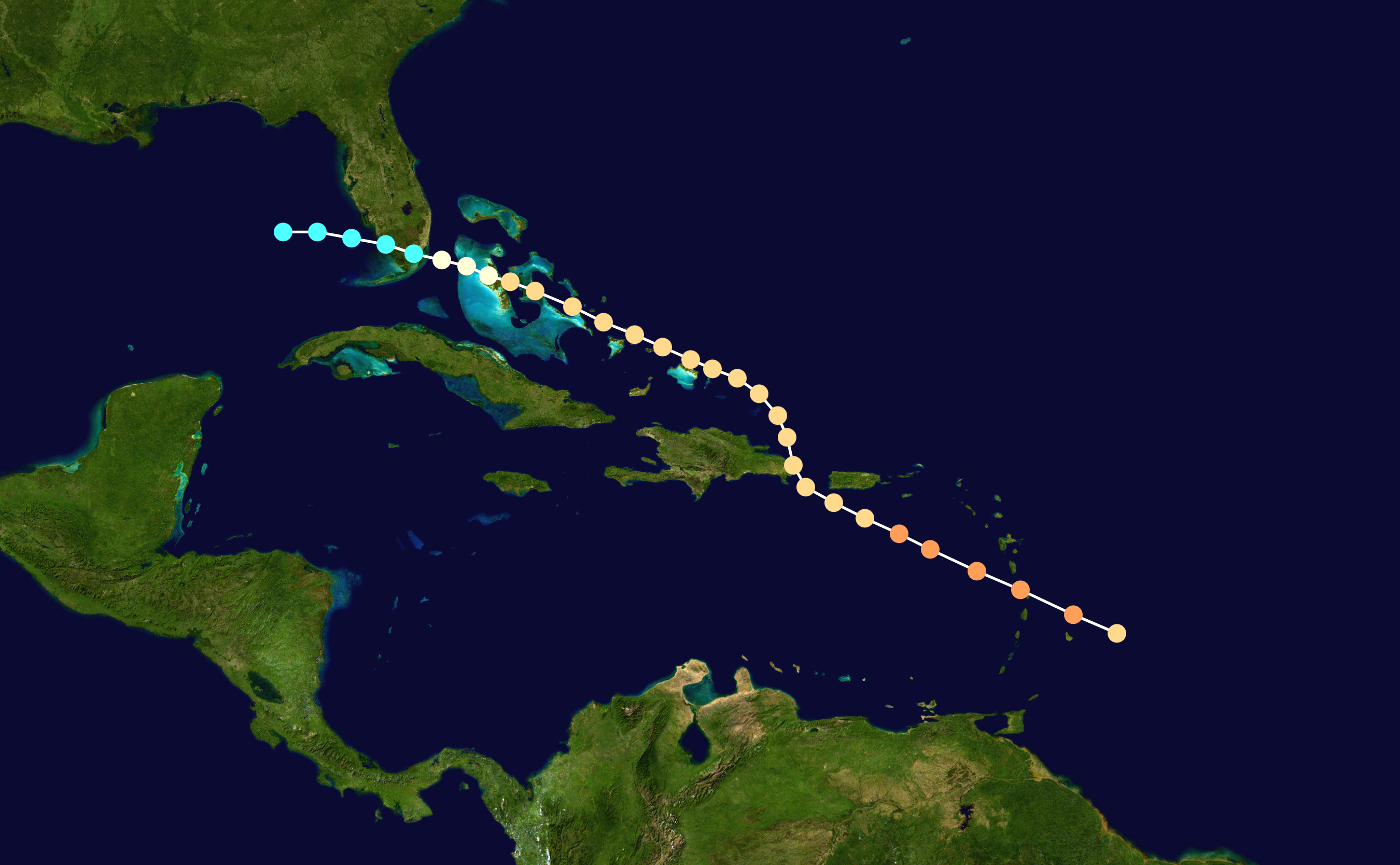
Map plotting the storm's track and intensity, according to the Saffir–Simpson scale Map key Saffir–Simpson scale Tropical depression (≤38 mph, ≤62 km/h) Tropical storm (39–73 mph, 63–118 km/h) Category 1 (74–95 mph, 119–153 km/h) Category 2 (96–110 mph, 154–177 km/h) Category 3 (111–129 mph, 178–208 km/h) Category 4 (130–156 mph, 209–251 km/h) Category 5 (≥157 mph, ≥252 km/h) Unknown Storm type Tropical cyclone Subtropical cyclone Extratropical cyclone, remnant low, tropical disturbance, or monsoon depression

The ship Esk encountered this cyclone first overnight on August 17–August 18 while sailing from Barbados to Saint Lucia. Based on reports of hurricane-force winds from Dominica and Martinique on August 18, the official hurricane database (HURDAT) initiates the track of this storm that day at 12:00 UTC as a 105 mph (170 km/h) Category 2 hurricane on the modern-day Saffir–Simpson scale about 95 mi (153 km) east of Barbados. Within six hours, the storm attained winds that correspond to Category 3 status, which is considered present-day major hurricane. Late on August 18, the hurricane made landfall on Martinique at its peak intensity with maximum sustained winds of 125 mph (205 km/h) and a minimum atmospheric pressure of 961 mbar (28.4 inHg). Both figures are estimated based on extensive damage on the island and Father Benito Viñes calculating the cyclone had a small radius. Early on August 19, the storm emerged into the Caribbean Sea and headed northwestward. Gradual weakening occurred, and on August 20, the cyclone fell to Category 2 status while located south of Puerto Rico. Later that day, a north-northwestward motion commenced, with the storm either striking or remaining just offshore the Dominican Republic.

After crossing the Mona Passage, the cyclone re-emerged into the Atlantic and then turned northwestward on August 21, passing just north of Grand Turk of the Turks and Caicos Islands. The system moved near or over several islands of the Bahamas, including Crooked Island and later Andros on August 23. Beginning that day, a ridge of high pressure was situated off the southeast coast of the United States, preventing the storm from executing a recurve to the north or northeast. Around 00:00 UTC on August 24, the storm weakened to a Category 1 while moving more west-northwestward, approximately 15 hours before it struck near present-day Homestead, Florida, with winds of 80 mph (130 km/h). However, the Atlantic hurricane reanalysis project noted that this intensity is uncertain due to a lack of observations from around the landfall area. The cyclone quickly weakened to a tropical storm prior to emerging into the Gulf of Mexico early on August 25. At 18:00 UTC that day, the official track listed in HURDAT terminates approximately 185 mi (300 km) west of Naples, Florida, based on a lack of observations from ships beyond that point. However, there were reports of a cyclonic disturbance in the eastern Gulf of Mexico until August 29.

Climate researcher Michael Chenoweth's 2014 study proposes an expansion of the cyclone's track back to August 16, with the system beginning as a tropical storm but intensifying into a hurricane on the next day. His study also argues that the storm became stronger than indicated in HURDAT, peaking as a Category 4 hurricane with maximum sustained winds of 140 mph (220 km/h) and a minimum pressure of 947 mbar (28.0 inHg) as it struck Martinique. Although Chenoweth's track mostly followed the official HURDAT track from August 18 to August 21, his study concludes that the cyclone turned westward at Crooked Island and avoided most of the Bahamas. After reaching near the coast of Cuba on August 24, the storm curved northwestward and struck near the same location in Florida but as a tropical storm. However, these changes have not yet been officially included in HURDAT.

== Impact ==
On Martinique, the storm struck the east side of the island at about 6:00 pm. Throughout the storm, frequent lightning occurred. Houses, crops and trees across the entire island were obliterated. Especially, the loss of coffee, sugar and cotton crops had a large effect on Martinique's economy. In Ducos, it is noted that only four homes remained following the storm, and at Saint-Pierre, at least 34 people lost their lives. The latter experienced the worst damage on the island in monetary terms, totaling nearly 12.2 million francs (just over $2.33 million). At Fort de France, the main part of the hospital collapsed, crushing to death two artillery men. Also, a military camp in Balata was destroyed, where houses comprising the campus suffered from severe roof damage. A number of soldiers there sustained injuries from airborne wood planks and beams. All vessels at harbors were lost during the hurricane. Communications between Fort de France and elsewhere on Martinique experienced severe disruptions.

Initially, the total number of fatalities on Martinique was placed at sixty. Later, 118 were reported dead in coastal locations alone. Even after the storm, finding an exact number of casualties was difficult because all roads in and out of interior sections of the island were impassable, blocked by downed trees and large amounts of washed out soil and rock. For a final death toll, the August 1891 Monthly Weather Review states that 700 perished in the storm. However, some newspapers report that the passage of the cyclone resulted in at least 1,000 deaths in Martinique, many of which occurred due to poor hygienic conditions on the island. A report presented to the Chamber of Deputies also noted that "the shock [on the night of the hurricane] was such that most women who were still pregnant gave birth to stillborns." Additionally, another 1,000 people sustained injuries of one form or another as a direct result of the cyclone. Total damage is estimated at $10 million (1891 USD).

In the aftermath of the hurricane, Delphino Moracchini, Governor of Martinique, issued an appeal via telegraph for aid to victims, explaining that many residents were left without food or shelter. Additionally, French president Sadi Carnot allocated $200,000 for recovery efforts. More than 791,000 francs (over $151,000 USD) had been raised by December 1891, had been raised. However, many of these funds were instead used to continue rebuilding Fort-de-France from a devastating fire in 1890.

Saint Lucia reported squalls throughout August 18. Damage was slight, mostly limited to some losses at banana plantations, a few huts being demolished, and part of a coastal road being washed away due to storm surge and abnormally high tides. Winds downed many fences and damaged fruit trees on Dominica. Along the coast and offshore rough seas capsized many canoes and boats, leaving seven people missing. The hurricane produced strong winds and up to 3.79 in (96 mm) on Guadeloupe. However, little impacts occurred than a boat capsizing and several people suffering injuries. One person died off the southwest tip of Saint Croix after a ship capsized. Portions of Puerto Rico reported heavy rainfall. Consequently, the Humacao River overflowed into the town. In Carolina, up to 6.6 ft (2 m) covered some streets. Along the west coast of Puerto Rico, overflowing waterways between Cabo Rojo and Hormigueros swept away numerous animals. The steamship Ozama reported hundreds of downed fruit trees and numerous damaged homes in the Dominican Republic. When the hurricane passed north of Grand Turk, three people drowned on the island, and there was some damage to small houses and shipping vessels. In the U.S. State of Florida, it hit near Homestead as a minimal hurricane, blowing boats onshore near present-day Cutler, though due to lack of observations near the landfall location its impact in the state is largely unknown.

== See also ==
- List of Atlantic hurricanes
