= Stone Blanton =

American football linebacker (born 2002)

Profile
- Position: Linebacker

Personal information
- Born: September 12, 2002 (age 24); Jackson, Mississippi, U.S.
- Listed height: 6 ft 2 in (1.88 m)
- Listed weight: 227 lb (103 kg)

Career information
- High school: Madison-Ridgeland (Madison, Mississippi)
- College: South Carolina (2022–2023); Mississippi State (2024)
- NFL draft: 2025: undrafted

Career history
- San Francisco 49ers (2025)*
- * Offseason or practice squad member only
- Stats at Pro Football Reference

Stone Blanton (born September 12, 2002) is an American professional football linebacker. He played college football for the South Carolina Gamecocks and Mississippi State Bulldogs.

== Early life ==
Blanton attended Madison-Ridgeland Academy in Madison, Mississippi. As a sophomore he totaled 99 tackles, five sacks and one pass break. As a senior Blanton notched 125 tackles with 26 tackles for loss and 11 sacks. Coming out of high school, he was rated as a four-star recruit and held offers from schools such as Auburn, Louisville, Mississippi State, Ole Miss Oregon, Stanford, and Texas A&M. Initially, Blanton committed to play college baseball for the Mississippi State Bulldogs. However he eventually committed to play college football for the South Carolina Gamecocks.

== College career ==
=== South Carolina ===
As a freshman in 2022, Blanton appeared in 12 games where he totaled seven tackles with a tackle and a half being for a loss. In week 4 of the 2023 season, he notched four tackles and a forced fumble versus Mississippi State. In week 11, Blanton returned an interception 88 yards for the game-sealing touchdown versus Jacksonville State. During the 2023 season, he was a team captain for the Gamecocks, where he notched 52 tackles, a sack, a forced fumble, an interception, and a touchdown. After the season, Blanton entered his name into the NCAA transfer portal.

=== Mississippi State ===
Blanton transferred to play for the Mississippi State Bulldogs. In week 13 of the 2024 season, he notched a season-high 18 tackles versus Missouri. Blanton finished the 2024 season with 125 tackles with three and a half being for a loss, three pass deflections, two forced fumbles, and a fumble recovery. After the season, he decided to forgo his final season of eligibility and declare for the 2025 NFL draft.

== Professional career ==
Pre-draft measurables
Height	Weight	Arm length	Hand span	20-yard shuttle	Three-cone drill	Vertical jump	Bench press
6 ft 1 7/8 in (1.88 m)	227 lb (103 kg)	30 1/8 in (0.77 m)	9 5/8 in (0.24 m)	4.36 s	7.34 s	35.5 in (0.90 m)	16 reps
All values from Pro Day

On May 12, 2025, Blanton signed an undrafted free agent contract with the San Francisco 49ers. He was waived on August 26 as part of final roster cuts. Blanton was re-signed to the practice squad on October 22. He was released on November 4 and re-signed to the practice squad on November 19. On November 26, Blanton was released after the team signed Eric Kendricks.
