= Strawberry Patch Park =

Park in Madison, Mississippi, United States

Coordinates: 32°26′58″N 90°6′19″W

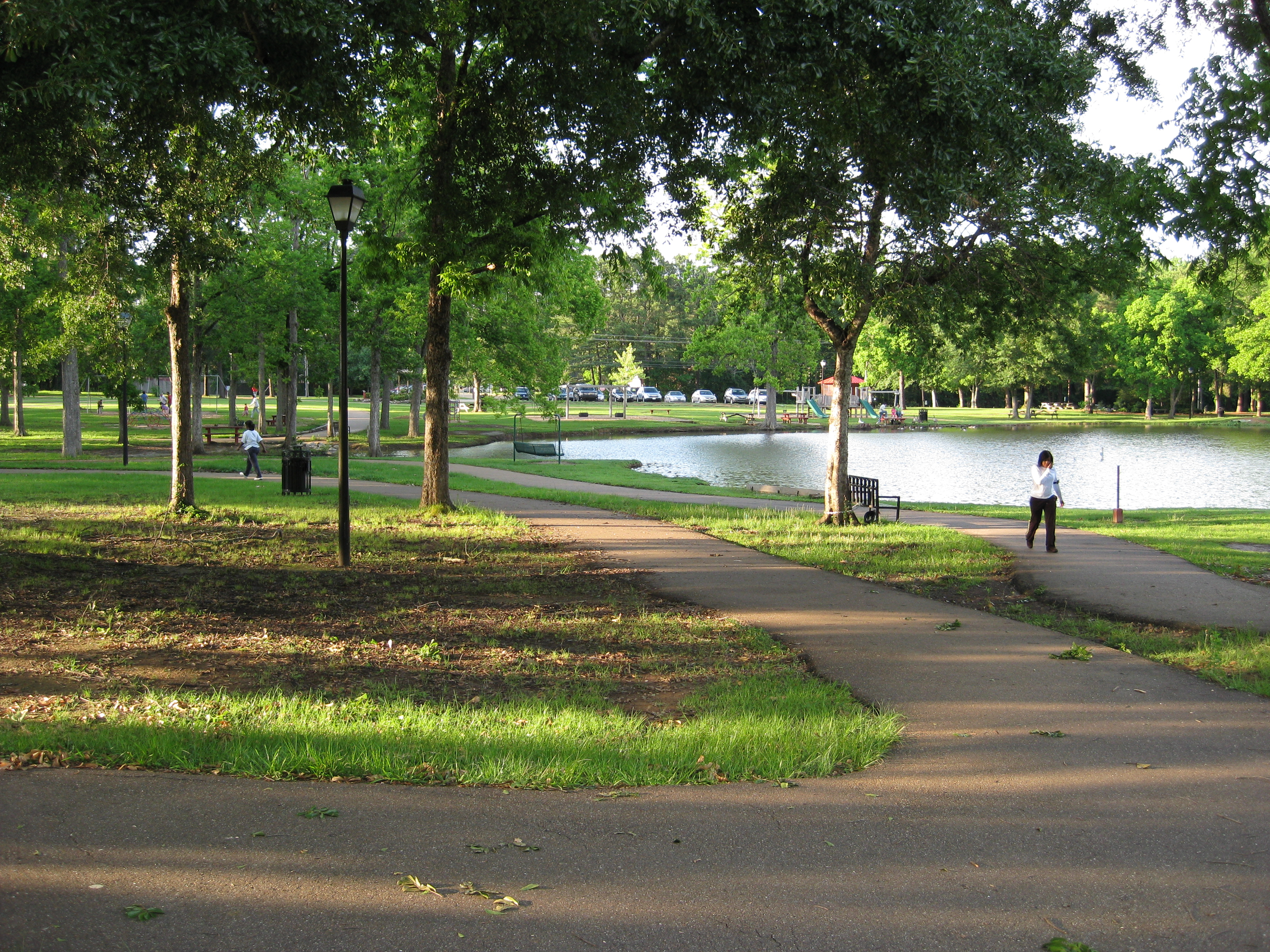
Summer 2009

Strawberry Patch Park is a 7-acre (28,000 m^{2}) city park in Madison, Mississippi. It contains a one-mile (1.6 km) running path, a pond used for fishing by children, ducks, geese, and a playground. It is located at 271 St. Augustine Drive (the intersection of St. Augustine and Old Canton Road), across the Street from Madison-Ridgeland Academy (MRA).

It has been designated a Blue Star Memorial By-way, a tribute to the Armed Forces of America, by Northbay-Madison Garden Club, a National Garden Clubs, Inc. member.
