= Will Longwitz =

American politician

Member of the Mississippi Senate from the 25th district
- In office January 2012 – January 2016
- Preceded by: J. Walter Michel
- Succeeded by: J. Walter Michel

Personal details
- Born: November 30, 1972 (age 53) Meridian, Mississippi, U.S.
- Party: Republican

Will Longwitz (born November 30, 1972, in Meridian, Mississippi) is an attorney and American politician from Mississippi. A Republican, Longwitz was elected to the Mississippi Senate in 2011. He is a graduate of Georgetown University and the University of Mississippi School of Law. He is vice chair of the Senate Constitution committee. He lives in Madison, Mississippi.

Longwitz was involved in a scandal where Temporary Assistance for Needy Families (TANF) funds were illegally given to his lobbying firm; he did not disclose that he was given said funds. His firm settled with the state of Mississippi, of whom he must return $318,325.
