= John F. Burrow =

American lawyer

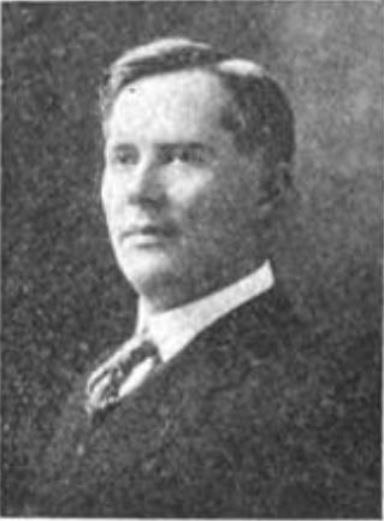
- c. 1917

Member of the Mississippi State Senate from the 29th district
- In office January 1916 – January 1920

Member of the Mississippi House of Representatives from the Jefferson Davis County district
- In office January 1912 – January 1916

Personal details
- Born: November 6, 1885 Prentiss, Mississippi, U.S.
- Died: August 27, 1958 (aged 72) Madison, Mississippi, U.S.
- Party: Democratic

John Fleet Burrow (November 6, 1885 - August 27, 1958) was an American Democratic politician. He was a member of the Mississippi State Senate from 1916 to 1920, and of the Mississippi House of Representatives from 1912 to 1916.

== Early life ==
John Fleet Burrow was born on November 6, 1885, in Prentiss, Mississippi. He was the son of John Alexander Burrow and Margaret (Odom) Burrow. He was of English and Scottish descent. Burrow attended the public schools of Lawrence County, Mississippi and attended Mississippi College from 1901 to 1904. He then was a principal of high schools in several Mississippi towns. After matriculating in 1907, he graduated from the University of Lebanon in 1908 with a B. Ph. degree. He attended the University of Tennessee from 1909 to 1910, and studied law at Millsaps College from 1911 to 1912. He graduated from Millsaps with an L. L. B. degree. He then moved to Ruleville, Mississippi, to begin his legal practice.

== Career ==
From 1907 to 1911, Burrow was the secretary of the Democratic Committee of Jefferson Davis County, Mississippi. He was a delegate to the 1908 Democratic National Committee in Denver, Colorado. Burrow was elected to represent Jefferson Davis County as a Democrat in the Mississippi House of Representatives in November 1911 for the 1912–1916 term. In 1915, he was elected to be the floater representative of the 29th District in the Mississippi State Senate for the 1916–1920 term.

== Later life ==
In about 1949, Burrow moved to Madison, Mississippi. After living there for 9 years, Burrow died there on the afternoon of August 27, 1958. He was survived by two sisters, two brothers, and three half-brothers.
