= Roy K. Moore =

FBI agent

Roy K. Moore (June 11, 1914 – October 12, 2008) was an American FBI agent and former Marine who was best known as the chief agent who investigated the disappearance of civil rights workers James Chaney, Michael Schwerner and Andrew Goodman. The 1988 film Mississippi Burning, starring Gene Hackman and Willem Dafoe, was based on that case. Because of the efforts of Moore and his agents, nineteen men were indicted and seven were convicted. All served fewer than six years in prison.

== Biography ==
Roy Moore was born on June 11, 1914, in Hood River, Oregon, United States. After his high school graduation he joined the United States Marine Corps in 1933, and was assigned to the Marine base in Quantico, VA where the FBI is also located. In 1935 he became the firearms instructor and was teaching the newly hired FBI Special Agents. His interest in the FBI grew as a result of his teaching the new agents. He joined the FBI as a clerk in Richmond, VA office. He latter transferred to the Miami, FL office. He eventually obtained an Accounting degree from the University of Miami, which qualified him to become FBI Special Agent. In 1940 he was promoted as a Special Agent of the FBI. Because of his reputation he was called on many times to help solve special cases around the country. In 1955 he helped solve the midair explosion of United Air Lines Flight 629 near Denver, CO in which forty-four people lost their lives. A man had placed a bomb in his mother's suitcase in order to collect her life insurance.

He oversaw investigations of some of the most notorious civil rights killings, including those that are depicted in the movie, Mississippi Burning. In 1964, Agent Moore was hand picked by J. Edgar Hoover to come to Mississippi and oversee the investigation of the disappearance of the three civil rights workers, Michael Schwerner, James Chaney and Andrew Goodman. Nearly two months later, their bodies were found in the banks of a dam in Neshoba County, MS. He is credited with the first FBI Bureau established in Mississippi. He retired from the FBI in 1974 and worked at Deposit Guaranty National Bank in Jackson, Mississippi, where he served as chief of security until 1981. He died of complications of pneumonia on October 12, 2008, in Madison, Mississippi.

== Personal life ==
His wife died in 1994. He survived by three children; nine grandchildren; 10 great-grandchildren; and three great-great-grandchildren. Both of his sons-in-law joined the FBI after meeting Moore.
