= J. Walter Michel =

American politician

Member of the Mississippi State Senate from the 25th district
- Incumbent
- Assumed office March 21, 2016
- Preceded by: Will Longwitz
- In office January 4, 2000 – January 3, 2012
- Preceded by: Dick Hall
- Succeeded by: Will Longwitz

Member of the Mississippi House of Representatives from the 66th district
- In office January 7, 1992 – January 5, 1993
- Preceded by: Mike Gunn
- Succeeded by: Ken Stribling

Personal details
- Born: Joseph Walter Michel III; December 30, 1960 (age 65) Jackson, Mississippi, U.S.
- Party: Republican
- Education: University of Mississippi (BBA)

Joseph Walter Michel III (born December 30, 1960) is an American politician who has served in the Mississippi State Senate from the 25th district since 2016. He previously served in the Mississippi State Senate from 2000 to 2012.

Party political offices
Preceded by	Republican nominee for Mississippi State Treasurer; 1995	Vacant Title last held by Tate Reeves
