= Dallas Walker =

American football player (born 1988)

No. 12, 11, 81, 86, 85
- Position: Tight end

Personal information
- Born: February 22, 1988 (age 38); Memphis, Tennessee, U.S.
- Listed height: 6 ft 6 in (1.98 m)
- Listed weight: 250 lb (113 kg)

Career information
- High school: Madison-Ridgeland (MS) Academy
- College: Western Michigan
- NFL draft: 2012: undrafted

Career history
- Georgia Rampage (2013); San Diego Chargers (2013)*; Dallas Cowboys (2014)*; Carolina Panthers (2015)*
- * Offseason or practice squad member only
- Stats at Pro Football Reference

Dallas Walker (born February 22, 1988) is an American former football tight end.

== College career ==
Walker played college football at Western Michigan University (WMU). He initially spent a redshirt season at the University of Memphis before transferring to the Georgia Military College junior college. In 2008, Walker ranked 4th in the NJCAA among QB’s in completion percentage (64%) with 17 touchdowns and 5 interceptions. Walker transferred to WMU for the 2009 season and spent three seasons for the Broncos as a tight end.

== Professional career ==
=== Georgia Rampage ===
Walker signed with the Georgia Rampage of the Ultimate Indoor Football League (UIFL) in 2013.

=== San Diego Chargers ===
Walker was signed by the San Diego Chargers in April 2013. On August 25, 2013, he was released by the Chargers.

=== Dallas Cowboys ===
On July 17, 2014, the Dallas Cowboys signed Walker.

=== Carolina Panthers ===
The Carolina Panthers signed Walker on August 25, 2015. The team waived him on August 30.
