= Simmons Arboretum =

Arboretum in Madison, Mississippi, United States

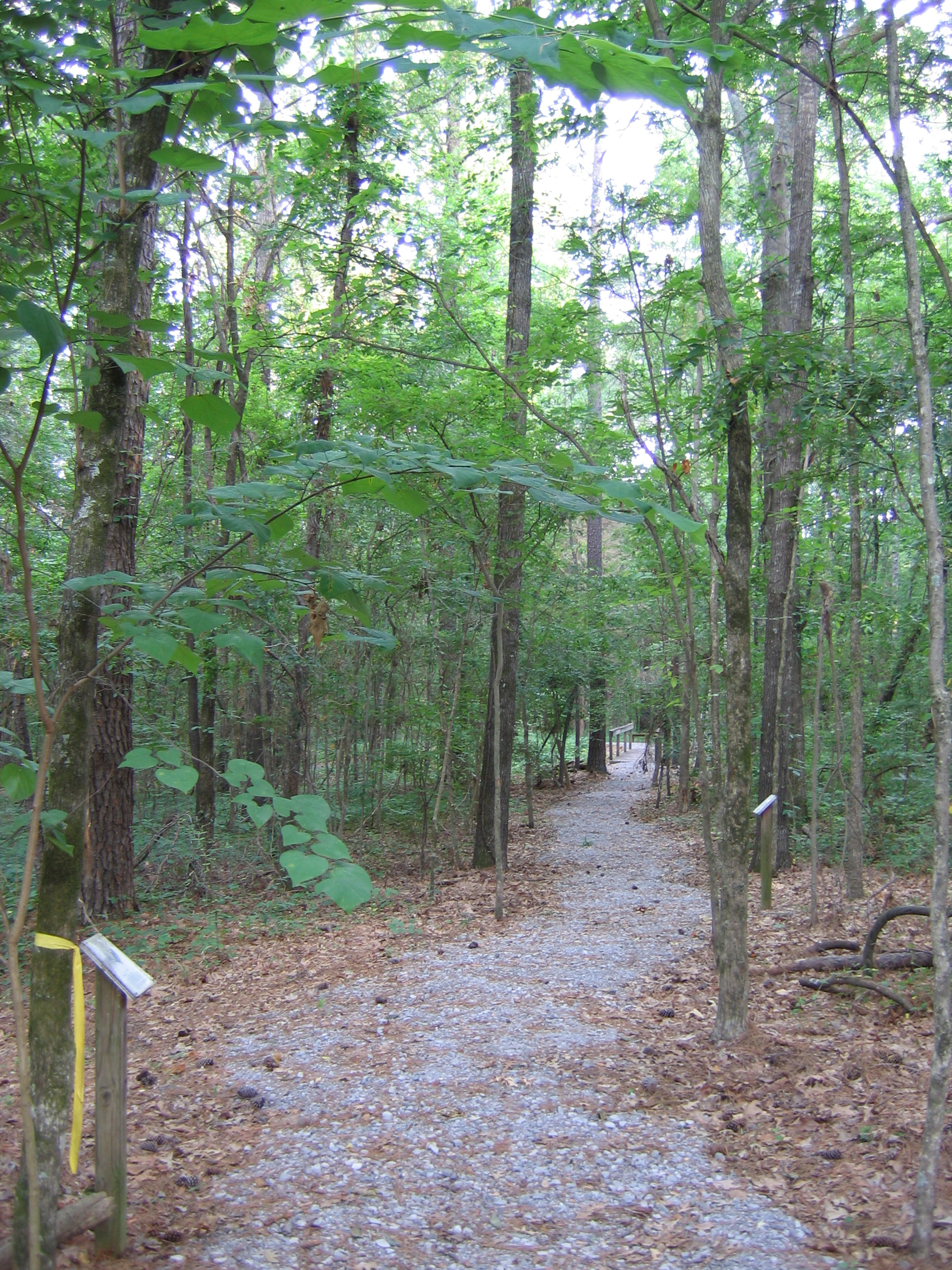
- One of the trails in the arboretum.
- Interactive map of Simmons Arboretum
- Website: Official website

Simmons Arboretum is a 10-acre (40,000 m^{2}) arboretum in Madison, Mississippi, United States. It is city-owned, a work in progress, and open to the public. It is located at the eastern end of St. Augustine Drive south of the road at 32.449285°N 90.074362°W.

The Arboretum was created from land donated to the city by Dr. and Mrs. Walter Simmons, and has evolved from unimproved land to a nature walk. Nearly a mile (1.6 km) of walking trails now exist, and plants have been identified and cataloged. Ongoing plans include further design, planting, and labeling of the species.

It has been designated a Blue Star Memorial, a tribute to the Armed Forces of America, by Northbay-Madison Garden Club, a National Garden Clubs, Inc. member.

== See also ==
- List of botanical gardens in the United States
