= Madison-Ridgeland Academy =

Segregation Academy in Madison, Mississippi, United States

Location
- 7601 Old Canton Road; Madison, Mississippi; United States; 32°26′59″N 90°6′25″W

Information
- Type: Independent
- Motto: Educating the Mind, Body & Spirit
- Religious affiliation: Christianity
- Established: 1969
- School district: 6A
- Dean: Brent Cofield (high school); Danny White (middle school)
- Principal: Greg Self (high school); Ben Haindel (middle school)
- Headmaster: "Termie" Land
- Grades: K3-12
- Gender: Coeducational
- Enrollment: 1,500 (est.)
- Campus: Suburban
- Colors: MRA Red, White, Patriot Blue
- Athletics: Basketball, Baseball, Football, Golf, Track & Field, Cross Country, Tennis, Soccer, Volleyball, and Archery
- Mascot: Patriot
- Nickname: Patriots
- Rival: Jackson Prep, Jackson Academy
- Accreditation: SACS, SAIS, MAIS
- Newspaper: The Patriot Recap
- Affiliations: Mississippi Association of Independent Schools, Southern Association of Independent Schools, Southern Association of Colleges and Schools
- Website: www.mrapats.org

Madison-Ridgeland Academy (MRA, Madison-Ridgeland) is a private, co-educational school in Madison, Mississippi, for students from K-3 through 12th grade. There are 4 divisions; the Kindergarten (K3-K5), the Elementary (1st–5th grade), the Middle School (6th–8th grade), and the High School (9th–12th).

== History ==
MRA was housed in a Madison church for its first year as a school; the following year the school relocated to their first facility on their 25 acre campus. It has been described as a segregation academy.

In 1970, MRA was one of four private schools accused by the NAACP of using state provided public funding for textbooks. M. A. Snowden, Executive Secretary of the State Textbook board, stated that Mississippi law requires the loaning of textbooks to all students, whether they attend public or private schools.

In 2019, University of Mississippi chancellor Glenn Boyce was criticized because of his past affiliation with Madison-Ridgeland Academy.

== Dress code ==
The school has a strict dress code that requires uniforms.

== Demographics ==
In 1986 the school enrolled its first black student. As of 2025 it is reported that 94 percent of the students are white; 4 percent are black; 1 percent are Asian and/or Hispanic; and less than 1 percent are of other races.

In 2019, Nicolas Rowan became the school's first African-American salutatorian.

== Athletics ==
The school's sports programs have won multiple MAIS football championships, the most recent being in 2021. The school nickname is Patriots.

Basketball coach, Richard Duease, was inducted into the Mississippi Sports Hall of Fame in 2024. He is the winningest boys and girls high school coach in Mississippi, and the third winningest active high school basketball coach in the nation.

== Notable alumni ==
- Ruston Webster (1980), scout for the Atlanta Falcons, former GM of the Tennessee Titans
- Tate Ellington (1997), actor
- Dallas Walker (2006), former NFL tight end
- Saahdiq Charles (2017), offensive lineman for the Dallas Cowboys
- Stone Blanton (2022), linebacker for the San Francisco 49ers
- Josh Hubbard (2023), basketball player for the Mississippi State Bulldogs
