= Balata Garden =

Botanical garden in Martinique, French West Indies

Coordinates: 14°41′25″N 61°00′57″W

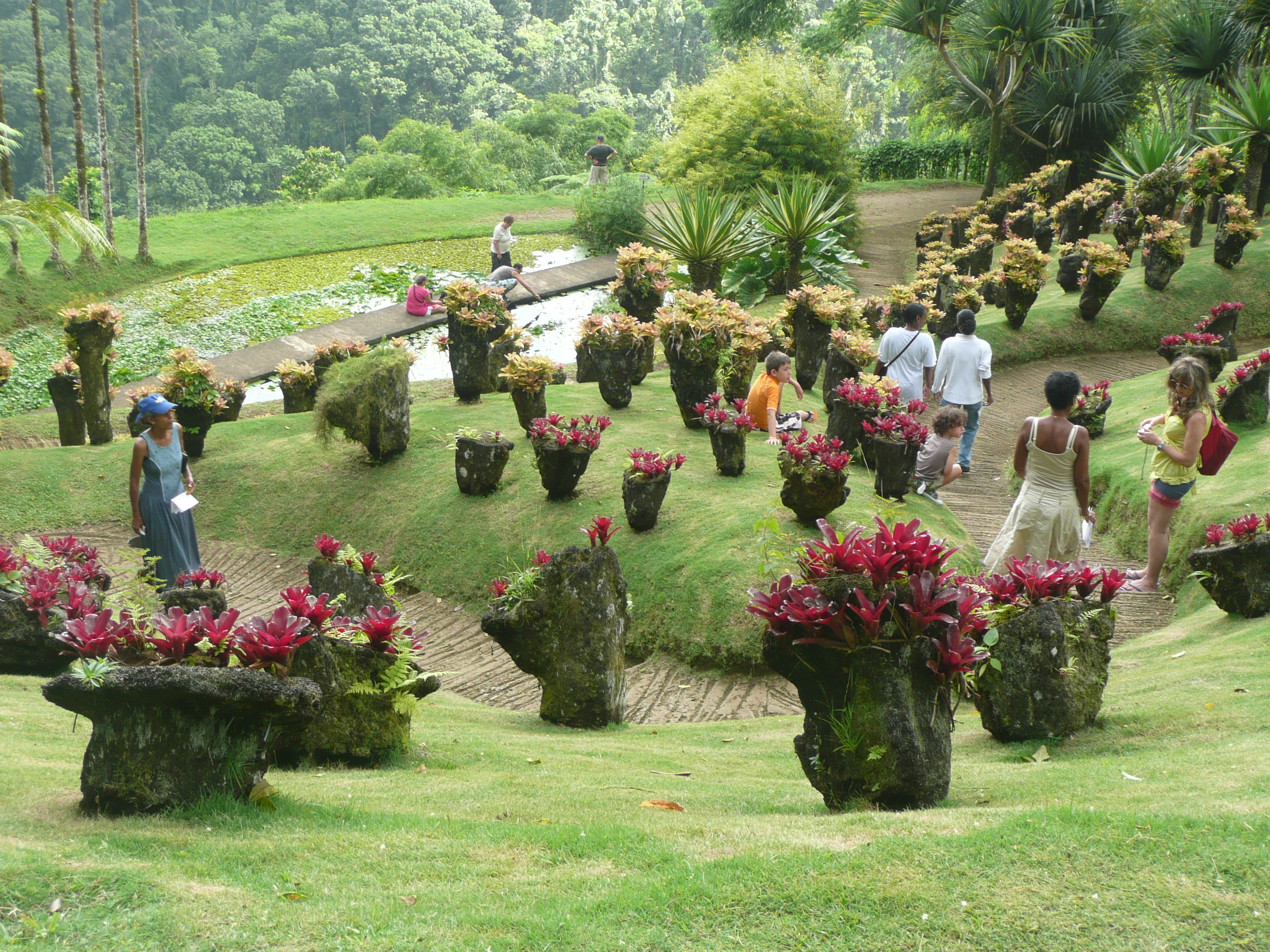
Jardin de Balata

The Balata Garden (French: jardin de Balata, [ʒaʁdɛ̃ də balata]; 3 hectares) is a private botanical garden located on the Route de Balata about 10 km outside of Fort-de-France, Martinique, French West Indies. It is open daily; an admission fee is charged.

== History ==
The garden was begun in 1982 by horticulturist Jean-Philippe Thoze and opened to the public in 1986. It is set on former farmland with picturesque views of the Pitons du Carbet. Today the garden contains about 3,000 varieties of tropical plants from around the world, including 300 types of palm trees. It also contains good collections of anthuriums, begonias, bromeliads, cycads, heliconia, mahogany, Musa nana, and bamboo (Dendrocalamus).

== See also ==
- List of botanical gardens in France
