= Humacao River =

River of Puerto Rico

Coordinates: 18.1199624°N 65.7809949°W

- Native name: Río Humacao (Spanish)

Location
- Commonwealth: Puerto Rico
- Municipality: Humacao

The Humacao River (Spanish: Río Humacao) is a river of Humacao, Puerto Rico and is in Las Piedras municipality, as well.

== See also ==
- List of rivers of Puerto Rico
