= Madison, Mississippi =

- City
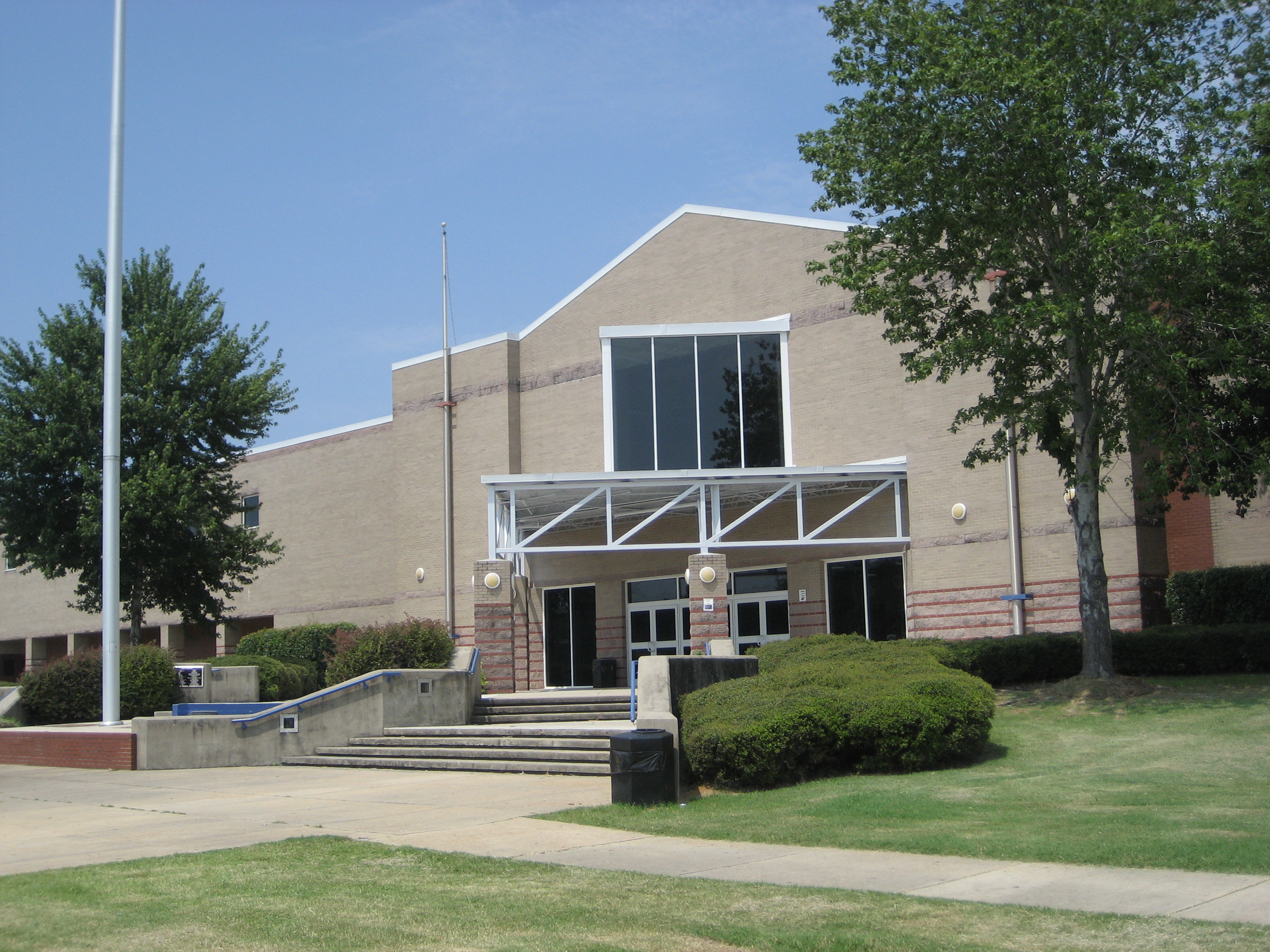
- Madison Central High School

- Flag Seal
- Nicknames: "Madison the City", "The Brick City"
- Location in Madison County and the state of Mississippi

- Location in the United States
- Coordinates: 32°28′26″N 90°07′50″W
- Country: United States
- State: Mississippi
- County: Madison
- Established: Since 1988

Government
  - Type: Municipality
  - Mayor: Mary Hawkins Butler (R)

Area
  - Total: 26.43 sq mi (68.5 km^{2})
  - Land: 25.25 sq mi (65.4 km^{2})
  - Water: 1.18 sq mi (3.1 km^{2})
- Elevation: 308 ft (94 m)

Population (2020)
  - Total: 27,747
  - Density: 1,098.6/sq mi (424.17/km^{2})
- Time zone: UTC−6 (Central (CST))
  - Summer (DST): UTC−5 (CDT)
- ZIP codes: 39110, 39130
- Area codes: 601, 769
- FIPS code: 28-44520
- GNIS feature ID: 2404992
- Website: madisonthecity.com

Madison is the 11th most populous city in Mississippi, United States, located in Madison County, 13 miles (21 km) north of the state capital, Jackson. The population was 27,747 at the 2020 census, up from 24,149 in 2010. It is part of the Jackson Metropolitan Statistical Area.

== History ==
The city of Madison, named for James Madison, the fourth president of the United States, developed along a bustling railroad track in antebellum Mississippi. It began in 1856 when the Illinois Central Railroad opened Madison Station, the forerunner of the city of Madison.

The nearby town of Madisonville was a settlement along the stagecoach route on the Natchez Trace. It was the first county seat of Madison County in 1828, and had a race track, two banks, a wagon factory, and at least one hotel. Its residents gradually moved to the new railroad community, and old Madisonville became defunct.

Like many railroad towns in the South, Madison Station was heavily damaged by the Union Army during the Civil War. Ten miles from the state capital of Jackson, Madison Station was largely destroyed in 1863 after the July 18–22 siege of Jackson. No battles were fought in Madison County, but Major General Stephen D. Lee concentrated his command in Madison Station during the month of February 1864. Stephen Lee was later appointed as the first president of Mississippi State College (now Mississippi State University).

The railroad continued to attract growth after the Civil War. In 1897, the Madison Land Company encouraged northerners to "Go South, and grow up with the country." Located in Chicago, the land company's interest in development prompted Madison to incorporate as a village, though the charter was lost when regular elections were not held because of the failure of the "land boom".

The Madison Land Company offered prime land for as little as $3.00 an acre. It claimed that Mississippi had the lowest debt ratio in the United States at $19.00 per capita and that Mississippians were one-third healthier by "official figures" than people in New York and Massachusetts. The figures were quoted in the Madison Land Company's brochure by Bishop Hugh Miller Thompson, the second Episcopal bishop of the Diocese of Mississippi and a Madison resident, who originally came from Wisconsin.

After many years of court battles, the city annexed other territory to expand its limits in size in the late 2000s.

On November 24, 2001, a violent F4 tornado impacted western portions of the city. Many homes were severely damaged or destroyed, including some that were leveled and swept from their foundations in the Fairfield subdivision. The tornado traveled 11.5 miles (18.5 km) across Madison County, damaging or destroying 164 homes along the path. Two people were killed by the tornado, and 21 others were injured.

== Geography ==
Madison is in southern Madison County and is bordered to the south by the city of Ridgeland. The city of Gluckstadt is 5 miles (8 km) to the north. Interstate 55 passes through the city, with access from Exit 107 (Madison Avenue) and Exit 108 (Hwy 463). U.S. Route 51 passes through the city center, now within the eastern part of the city limits as expansion has occurred to the west. The Natchez Trace Parkway runs along the eastern border of the city.

According to the U.S. Census Bureau, Madison has a total area of 26.4 square miles (68 km^{2}), of which 25.2 square miles (65 km^{2}) are land and 1.2 square miles (3.1 km^{2}), or 4.47%, are water. The east side of the city drains to the Ross Barnett Reservoir on the Pearl River, while the northern part drains to Bear Creek, a tributary of the Big Black River, and the western part drains to Limekiln Creek, a tributary of Bogue Chitto Creek, which also flows to the Big Black.

== Demographics ==
Historical population
Census	Pop.	Note	%±
1950	540		—
1960	703		30.2%
1970	853		21.3%
1980	2,241		162.7%
1990	7,471		233.4%
2000	14,692		96.7%
2010	24,149		64.4%
2020	27,747		14.9%
U.S. Decennial Census

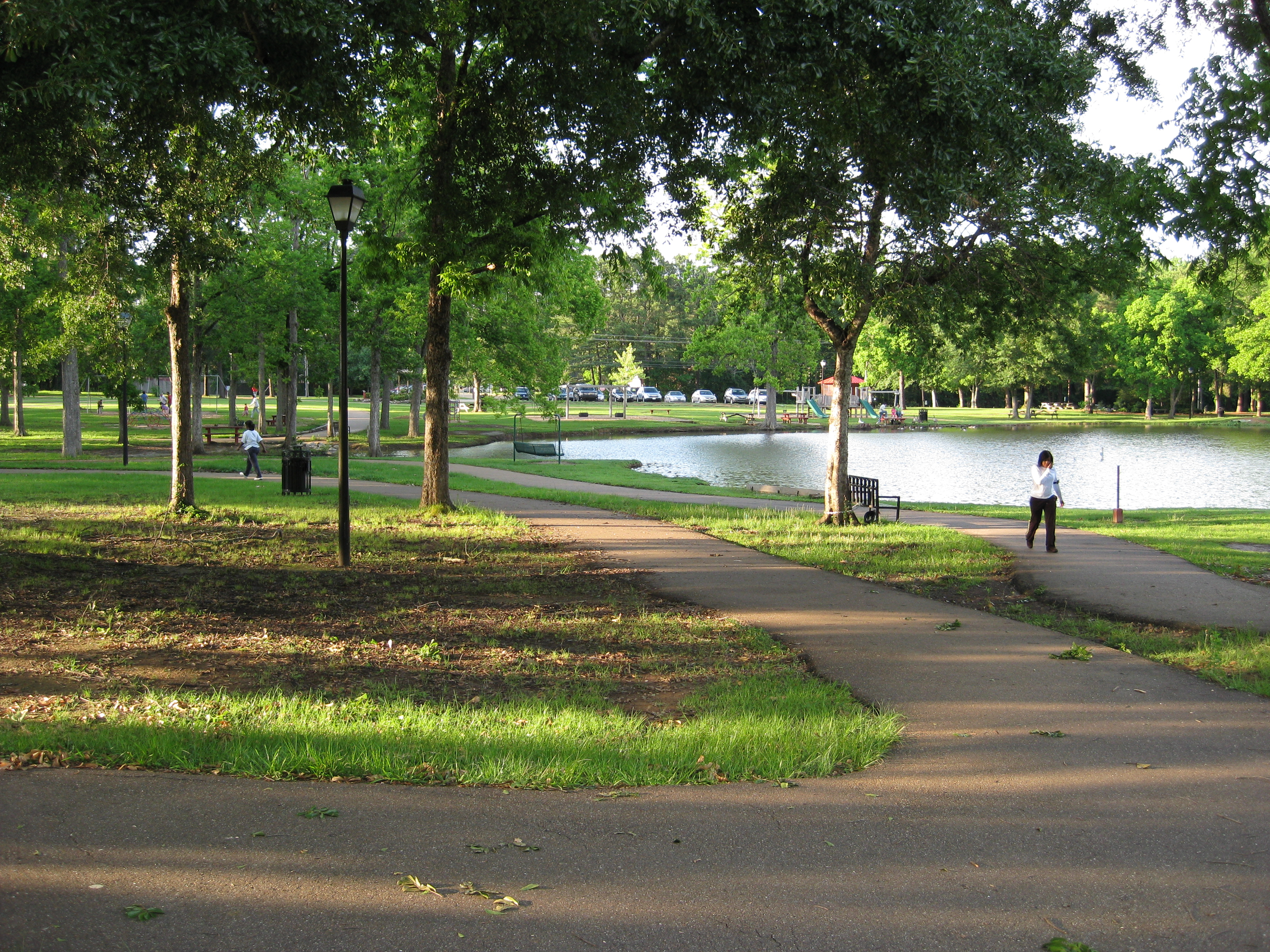
Strawberry Patch Park

=== 2020 census ===
As of the 2020 census, Madison had a population of 27,747, with 9,989 households and 7,121 families. The median age was 42.8 years. 25.1% of residents were under the age of 18 and 18.3% of residents were 65 years of age or older. For every 100 females there were 91.5 males, and for every 100 females age 18 and over there were 88.4 males age 18 and over.

94.9% of residents lived in urban areas, while 5.1% lived in rural areas.

There were 9,989 households in Madison, of which 36.9% had children under the age of 18 living in them. Of all households, 65.8% were married-couple households, 11.1% were households with a male householder and no spouse or partner present, and 21.2% were households with a female householder and no spouse or partner present. About 20.7% of all households were made up of individuals and 10.7% had someone living alone who was 65 years of age or older.

There were 10,418 housing units, of which 4.1% were vacant. The homeowner vacancy rate was 1.8% and the rental vacancy rate was 11.1%.

Racial composition as of the 2020 census
Race	Number	Percent
White	21,918	79.0%
Black or African American	3,248	11.7%
American Indian and Alaska Native	34	0.1%
Asian	1,345	4.8%
Native Hawaiian and Other Pacific Islander	6	0.0%
Some other race	241	0.9%
Two or more races	955	3.4%
Hispanic or Latino (of any race)	566	2.0%

=== 2000 census ===
As of the census of 2000, there were 14,692 people, 5,189 households, and 4,249 families residing in the city. The population density was 1,090.0 inhabitants per square mile (420.9/km^{2}). There were 5,316 housing units at an average density of 394.4 per square mile (152.3/km^{2}). The racial makeup of the city was 93.23% White, 4.89% African American, 0.07% Native American, 1.20% Asian, 0.03% Pacific Islander, 0.18% from other races, and 0.40% from two or more races. Hispanic or Latino of any race were 0.69% of the population.

There were 5,189 households, out of which 48.5% had children under the age of 18 living with them, 73.0% were married couples living together, 7.4% had a female householder with no husband present, and 18.1% were non-families. 16.3% of all households were made up of individuals, and 5.0% had someone living alone who was 65 years of age or older. The average household size was 2.81 and the average family size was 3.17.

In the city, the population was spread out, with 31.2% under the age of 18, 4.1% from 18 to 24, 35.1% from 25 to 44, 21.1% from 45 to 64, and 8.5% who were 65 years of age or older. The median age was 36 years. For every 100 females, there were 93.3 males. For every 100 females age 18 and over, there were 88.9 males.

The median income for a household in the city was $71,266 (estimated at $105,485 in 2008), and the median income for a family was $77,202. Males had a median income of $54,358 versus $34,081 for females. The per capita income for the city was $29,082. About 2.1% of families and 2.5% of the population were below the poverty line, including 3.5% of those under age 18 and 1.4% of those age 65 or over.

== Recreation ==
- Strawberry Patch Park, one mile running trail, playground, and children's fishing pond
- Liberty Park, sports fields and playgrounds
- Simmons Arboretum, wooded trail

== Education ==
Madison is served by the Madison County School District. The student/teacher ratio is 19:1.

Madison-Ridgeland Academy is a 6A private high school and member of the MSAIS located in Madison.

St. Joseph Catholic School is a parochial school located in Madison that serves the Jackson Area; it is of the Roman Catholic Diocese of Jackson.

In 2010, Tulane University opened a satellite campus of its School of Continuing Studies. The campus was housed in a renovated wing of the former Madison Station Elementary School (Madison Ridgeland High School) campus until it closed in 2017. Jackson State University has also opened a satellite campus in the city.

Madison Middle School is a public school located in Madison county

== Transportation ==
There is one small airport in the city, Bruce Campbell Field.

Jackson–Medgar Wiley Evers International Airport, 13 miles (21 km) to the southeast, is the commercial airport of the Jackson metropolitan area.

As for roads, I-55 shortly passes through the city while US-51 goes through the center of town. Mississippi Highway 463 serves as a major business corridor of Madison .

== Points of interest ==
- Simmons Arboretum
- The Chapel of the Cross, just outside the northwestern city limits in Mannsdale, is listed on the National Register of Historic Places.

== Notable people ==
- Joseph Bennett (Mississippi politician) 19th century state legislator
- Joel Bomgar, member of the Mississippi House of Representatives
- Eddie Briggs, lawyer and former lieutenant governor of Mississippi
- Buddy Brown, country music singer
- Shaq Buchanan (born 1997), basketball player in the Israeli Basketball Premier League
- John F. Burrow, former member of the Mississippi State Senate and Mississippi House of Representatives
- Corey Dickerson, professional baseball player for the Miami Marlins; resides in Madison during the offseason
- Tate Ellington, actor
- Stephen Gostkowski, professional football player for the Tennessee Titans
- Parys Haralson, former National Football League (NFL) linebacker
- Larry Hart, former NFL defensive end
- Sarah Beth James, Miss Mississippi 2010
- Timothy L. Johnson, former member of the Mississippi State Senate
- Will Longwitz, member of the Mississippi State Senate
- D. J. Montgomery, wide receiver for the Indianapolis Colts
- Roy K. Moore, FBI agent
- Ronnie Musgrove, 62nd governor of Mississippi
- John Henry Rogers, congressman from Arkansas and a federal judge
- Chris Spencer, former NFL center
- Spencer Turnbull, former Major League Baseball pitcher
- Dallas Walker, former NFL tight end
- Ruston Webster, NFL scout for the Atlanta Falcons
- Sammy Winder, former running back for the Denver Broncos
