= Lists of Los Angeles topics =

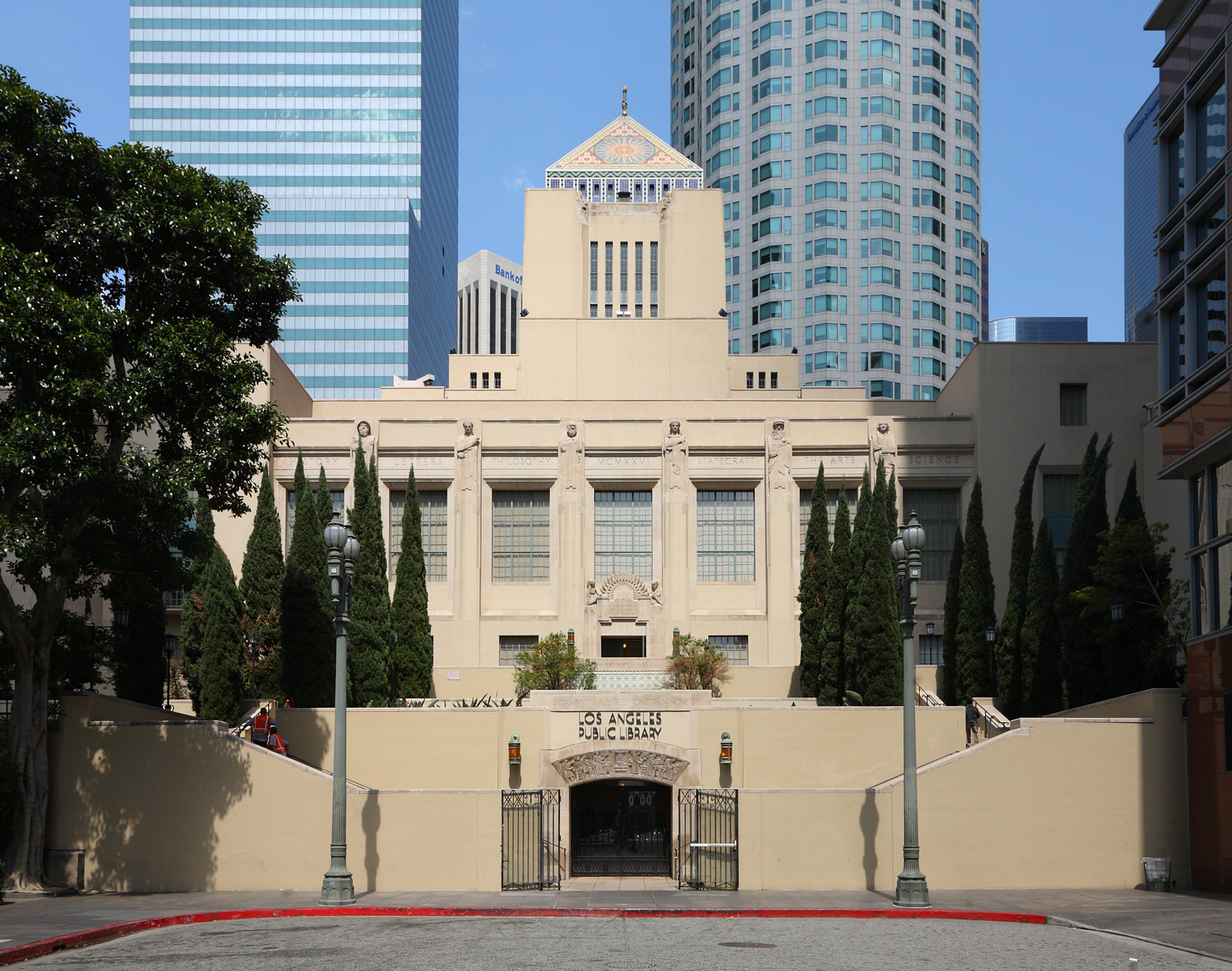
The Los Angeles Central Library in Downtown Los Angeles

== Architecture ==
- Los Angeles Historic-Cultural Monument
  - Historic-Cultural Monuments in Downtown Los Angeles
  - Historic-Cultural Monuments in Hollywood
  - Historic-Cultural Monuments in the Wilshire and Westlake areas
  - Historic-Cultural Monuments in South Los Angeles
  - Historic-Cultural Monuments on the East and Northeast Sides
  - Historic-Cultural Monuments in the San Fernando Valley
  - Historic-Cultural Monuments on the Westside
  - Historic-Cultural Monuments in Silver Lake, Angelino Heights, and Echo Park
  - Historic-Cultural Monuments in the Harbor area
- List of tallest buildings in Los Angeles
- National Register of Historic Places listings in Los Angeles

== Education ==
- List of Los Angeles Unified School District schools
- List of Museums in Los Angeles
- List of schools in the Roman Catholic Archdiocese of Los Angeles
- Los Angeles Public Library branches

== Geography ==
- Etymologies of place names in Los Angeles, California
- List of former municipalities in Los Angeles
- List of baseball parks in Los Angeles
- List of districts and neighborhoods of Los Angeles

== Government ==
- List of elected officials in Los Angeles
- List of Los Angeles fire chiefs
- List of mayors of Los Angeles
  - List of pre-statehood mayors of Los Angeles, California
- List of Los Angeles consulates
- List of Los Angeles Police Department Chiefs of Police

== History ==
- Outline of the history of Los Angeles

== Media and arts ==
- List of bands from Los Angeles
- List of films set in Los Angeles
- List of Hollywood novels
- List of local children's television series in Los Angeles
- List of Los Angeles Times publishers
- List of Los Angeles rappers
- List of television shows set in Los Angeles
- List of Los Angeles television stations

== People ==
- List of people from Los Angeles
  - List of alumni of University High School
  - List of Loyola High School (Los Angeles) people
  - List of people from Los Feliz, Los Angeles
  - List of University of California, Los Angeles people

== Transportation ==
- List of airports in the Los Angeles area
- List of Los Angeles bike paths
- List of Los Angeles Metro Rail stations
- Southern California freeways

== Sports ==
Los Angeles Clippers-related lists

- List of Los Angeles Clippers broadcasters
- List of Los Angeles Clippers head coaches
- List of Los Angeles Clippers seasons

Los Angeles Dodgers-related lists

- Los Angeles Dodgers all-time roster
- List of Los Angeles Dodgers broadcasters
- List of Los Angeles Dodgers managers
- List of Los Angeles Dodgers minor league affiliates
- Los Angeles Dodgers minor league players
- List of Los Angeles Dodgers Opening Day starting pitchers
- List of Los Angeles Dodgers owners and executives
- List of Los Angeles Dodgers seasons

Los Angeles Kings-related lists

- List of Los Angeles Kings broadcasters
- List of Los Angeles Kings draft picks
- List of Los Angeles Kings general managers
- List of Los Angeles Kings head coaches
- List of Los Angeles Kings players
- List of Los Angeles Kings seasons

Los Angeles Lakers-related lists

- Los Angeles Lakers all-time roster
- List of Los Angeles Lakers broadcasters
- List of Los Angeles Lakers first and second round draft picks
- List of Los Angeles Lakers head coaches
- List of Los Angeles Lakers seasons

== Other ==
- List of criminal gangs in Los Angeles, California
- List of sites of interest in the Los Angeles area
- List of wild animals from Los Angeles
