= List of Loyola High School (Los Angeles) people =

This is a list of notable alumni of Loyola High School in Los Angeles.

== Notable alumni and students ==
=== Athletics ===
- Toby Bailey - former UCLA basketball player and 1995 NCAA champion, former NBA player
- Gordon Banks - former NFL and USFL wide receiver
- Anthony Barr - former UCLA All-American outside linebacker, drafted in the first round of the 2014 NFL draft by the Minnesota Vikings, starting OLB in 2016 Pro Bowl
- Myles Bryant - defensive back for the New England Patriots, former All-Pac-12 football player at the University of Washington
- Chris Conte - safety for the Tampa Bay Buccaneers, formerly at Cal and Chicago Bears
- Garrett Cooper - first baseman for the San Diego Padres
- Danny Farmer - former UCLA football player and university record holder for most yards receiving, former NFL player
- Stefan Flintoft - CFL punter
- Jeff Grau - former NFL tight end/long snapper for the Dallas Cowboys and Miami Dolphins.
- Alex Johnson - NFL defensive back for the Indianapolis Colts
- George Kunz - former All-Pro NFL offensive lineman, played for the Atlanta Falcons and Baltimore Colts; first team All-American at Notre Dame Fighting Irish football
- Tim Layana - late Major League Baseball pitcher and World Series Champion (1990)
- Ryan Lefebvre - baseball announcer for the Kansas City Royals
- David Long - cornerback for the Las Vegas Raiders, formerly with the Los Angeles Rams, former All-Big Ten football player at the University of Michigan.
- Jim McAnany - right fielder for Chicago White Sox in 1959 World Series vs. Los Angeles Dodgers
- Kevin Parada - professional baseball player in the New York Mets organization and first round pick in the MLB draft
- George Paton - general manager of the Denver Broncos and former UCLA football player
- Al Pollard - All-American at Army and running back for the Philadelphia Eagles
- Tom Satriano - former Major League Baseball player
- Coleman Shelton - offensive lineman for the Los Angeles Rams, former All-Pac-12 football player at the University of Washington
- Sinjin Smith - pioneer world pro volleyball champion
- Fred Snodgrass - outfielder for the New York Giants and appeared in the 1912 World Series; later mayor of Oxnard, California
- Hollis Thompson - former Georgetown basketball player, Philadelphia 76ers shooting guard
- David Torrence - pro runner and American record holder in 1000 meter
- Matt Ware - former UCLA quarterback and safety with the Philadelphia Eagles, Arizona Cardinals and Toronto Argonauts
- Thomas Weber - former Arizona State football player and 2007 Lou Groza Award winner as the NCAA's top placekicker
- Thomas Welsh - Charlotte Hornets player, former UCLA basketball player, McDonald's All-American
- Ceyair Wright - college football cornerback for the Nebraska Cornhuskers and actor

=== Business and economics ===
- Thomas J. Barrack Jr. - CEO of Colony Capital
- James Barrett - founder of Chateau Montelena
- Jerry Grundhofer - former CEO and chairman of U.S. Bancorp
- John F. Grundhofer - retired chairman and CEO, U.S. Bancorp
- Enrique Hernandez Jr. - CEO of Inter-Con Security Systems, Inc., and non-executive chairman of McDonald's
- William J. McMorrow - chairman and CEO, Kennedy Wilson
- Edward P. Roski - founder of Majestic Realty Co., billionaire, 163rd richest American (2008)
- Wilfred Von der Ahe - founder of Von's grocery stores

=== Arts and entertainment ===
- 12th Planet - DJ and electronic music producer known for releasing Dubstep, Drum and bass, and Trap music records
- Andy Ackerman - multiple Emmy-winning director of Cheers, Seinfeld, WKRP in Cincinnati, Wings, The New Adventures of Old Christine
- Aron - singer and member of the boy band NU'EST
- Bob Beemer - multiple Academy Award-winning sound mixer
- Roddy Bottum - founder member of, and keyboardist in, alternative rock bands Faith No More and Imperial Teen
- James Brown - painter known for rough semi-figurative paintings
- Clifton Collins Jr. - award-winning actor, Traffic, Once Upon a Time in Hollywood
- Jeremy Culhane - comedian, Saturday Night Live cast member
- John Debney - Emmy-winning music composer for Disney and The Passion of the Christ
- Bill Gould - founder member of, and bassist in, alternative rock band Faith No More; music producer, sound engineer and record label proprietor
- Chet Hanks - actor and musician; son of actor Tom Hanks
- Chris Hardwick - CEO of Nerdist Industries, comedian, actor, television host of @midnight with Chris Hardwick
- Michael Keenan - actor (Picket Fences), stage director, and professor of acting at the University of Southern California
- Stuart McClave - director and writer known for On The Line: The Richard Williams Story
- Dan McCleary - artist; founder of Art Division, a nonprofit offering arts training, academic and career support to young adults in the MacArthur Park community in Los Angeles
- Dennis McNeil - singer
- Peter Miles - actor
- Patrick Muldoon - actor in film Starship Troopers and television show Days of Our Lives
- Paul Nassif - plastic surgeon, star of Real Housewives of Beverly Hills, Botched, and Botched by Nature
- Brendan O'Brien - actor and voice actor, voice of Crash Bandicoot in the Crash Bandicoot video game series 1996–2004
- Daniel Olivas - award-winning author and attorney
- Thes One - poet, rapper, and music producer; well known as one-half of musical act People Under the Stairs
- Tony Plana - actor in films and on television show Ugly Betty
- William Schallert - veteran character actor in many films and television shows including Perryr Mason, Star Trek, The Waltons, Hawaii Five-O, Quincy, M.E., The Partridge Family and Bonanza
- Jeff von der Schmidt - Grammy Award-winning conductor, founding artistic director of Southwest Chamber Music and the LA International New Music Festival
- Michael Wayne - film producer, son of Hollywood legend and founder of the John Wayne Cancer Institute
- Patrick Wayne - veteran motion picture and television actor began career in Rio Grande with his father John Wayne

=== Government, activism and politics ===
- Gene Baur - Farm Sanctuary president and co-founder
- Eugene Biscailuz - former Los Angeles County sheriff and organizer of the California Highway Patrol
- John M. Costello - member of US Congress and Democratic Party candidate for US president
- Isidore Dockweiler - served on the US Board of Indian Commissioners and Los Angeles City Library Commission; nominated John Costello as US presidential candidate
- John Dockweiler - former Los Angeles district attorney
- Bob Dornan - "B-1 Bob"; vocal US congressman from the South Bay for many years
- Mike Gatto - California state assemblyman
- Mike Levin - congressman from California's 49th congressional district
- Nick Pacheco - councilmember, City of Los Angeles (1999–2003); ASUC executive vice president, UC Berkeley (1984–1985); co-founder, CAL Students for Equal Rights & a Valid Education (CalSERVE), UC Berkeley (1984)
- Steve Pavlina - personal development blogger, motivational speaker, author
- Gerardo Sandoval - former member of the San Francisco Board of Supervisors and current judge of the San Francisco County Superior Court
- Alexander-Martin Sardina - German former member of parliament, attended the LHS in 1990 as an exchange student
- Bob Shrum - senior advisor to John Kerry's 2004 presidential campaign
- Anthony A. Williams - mayor of Washington, D.C., 1999–2007

=== Journalism and media ===
- Stan Chambers - longtime reporter with KTLA 5, Los Angeles
- Josh Elliott - television journalist
- Charles Glass - author and former ABC News chief Mideast correspondent
- George Herriman - pioneering cartoonist and creator of the Krazy Kat strip for the Los Angeles Herald Examiner
- Ryan Jacobs - deputy editor of Pacific Standard magazine; writer for magazines including The Atlantic and Mother Jones; author of The Truffle Underground
- Geoff Miller - founder of Los Angeles Magazine
- Daniel Olivas - award-winning author, book critic, and attorney
- Lawrence Ross, Jr. - Los Angeles Times bestselling author, college lecturer
- S. S. Van Dine - born Willard Huntington Wright; pioneer Los Angeles "noir" detective writer

=== Law ===
- Paul Boland - associate justice of the California Court of Appeal
- William Byrne - judge of the United States District Court for the Central District of California, presided over the trial of Pentagon Papers defendant Daniel Ellsberg
- Thomas Girardi - lawyer in the Erin Brockovich case; wife Erika Jayne appears on The Real Housewives of Beverly Hills
- Michael Tynan - judge of the Los Angeles County Superior Court

=== Educators and religious ===
- Gordon Bennett S.J. - former principal and president of Loyola High School and former Catholic bishop in Baltimore and Jamaica
- Greg Boyle, S.J. - founder of Homeboy Industries
- Joseph Sarsfield Glass, C.M. - 10th president of St. Vincent's College
- Robert J. Henle, S.J. - president of Georgetown University
- George H. Minamiki, S.J. - theologian and educator at the University of Notre Dame
- Mark R. Nemec (1987) - 9th president of Fairfield University
- Stephen Privett, S.J. - president - Verbum Dei High School, Los Angeles, CA
- Thomas J. Reese, S.J. - writer, editor and commentator on church affairs; President Obama appointed him to the United States Commission on International Religious Freedom
- Jonathan Veitch - 15th president of Occidental College
