= 2026 NBA draft =

80th edition of the NBA draft

General information
- Sport: Basketball
- Date: June 23–24, 2026
- Location: Barclays Center (Brooklyn, New York)
- Networks: ESPN; ABC (first round only)

Overview
- 60 total selections in 2 rounds
- League: National Basketball Association
- First selection: AJ Dybantsa (Washington Wizards)

The 2026 NBA draft was the 80th edition of the National Basketball Association's annual draft. This was the first draft since 2021 with 60 picks, as no teams forfeited second-round draft picks for free agency violations. The first round of the draft was held on June 23, and the second round was held on June 24. The Washington Wizards selected small forward AJ Dybantsa out of Brigham Young University first overall.

== Draft selections ==
PG	Point guard	SG	Shooting guard	SF	Small forward	PF	Power forward	C	Center

^{#}	Denotes player who has never appeared in an NBA regular-season or playoff game
^{~}	Denotes player who has been selected as Rookie of the Year

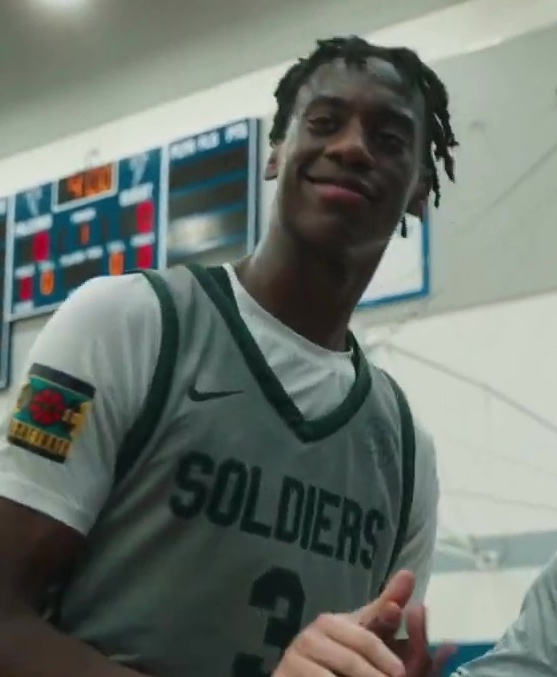
AJ Dybantsa was selected 1st overall by the Washington Wizards.

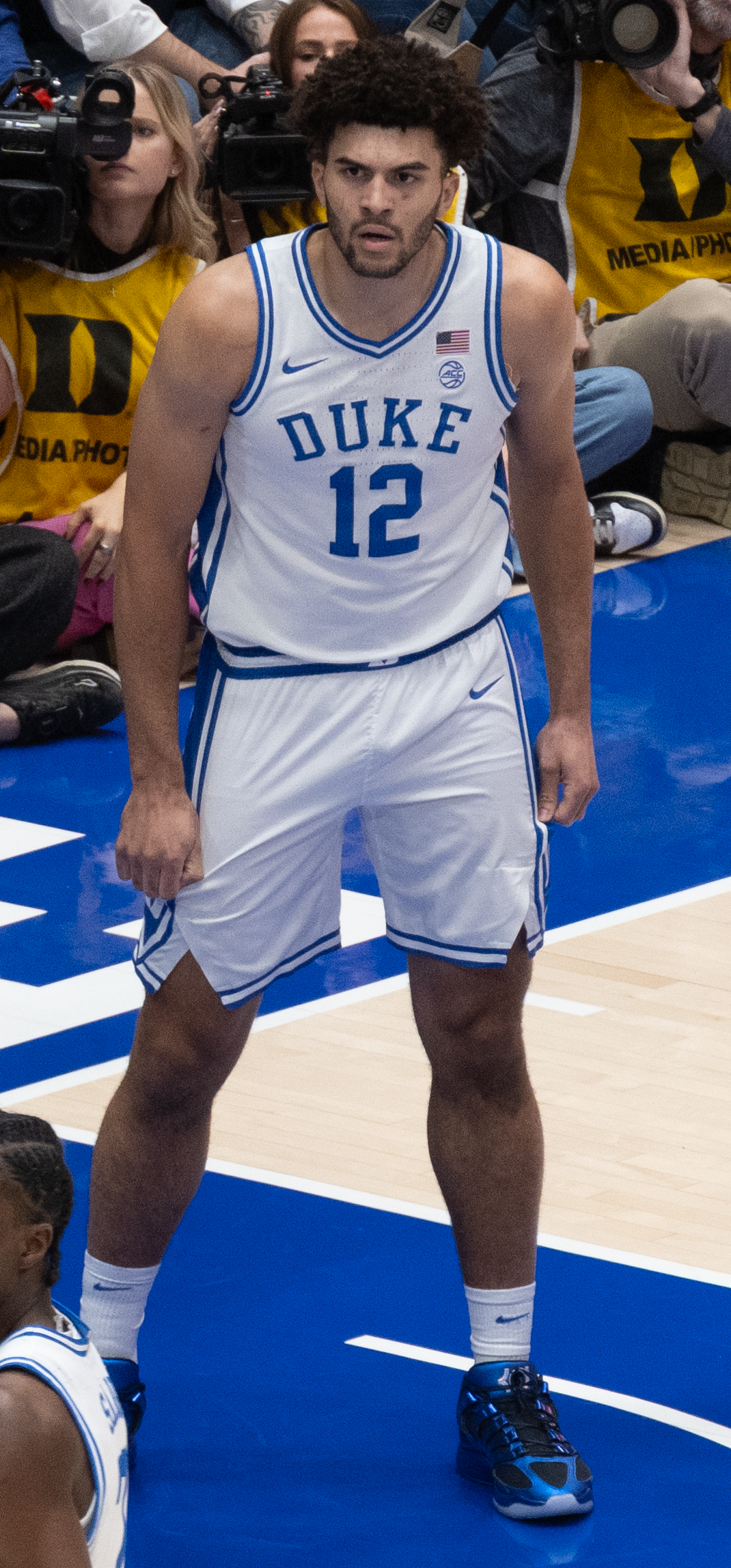
Cameron Boozer was selected 3rd overall by the Memphis Grizzlies.

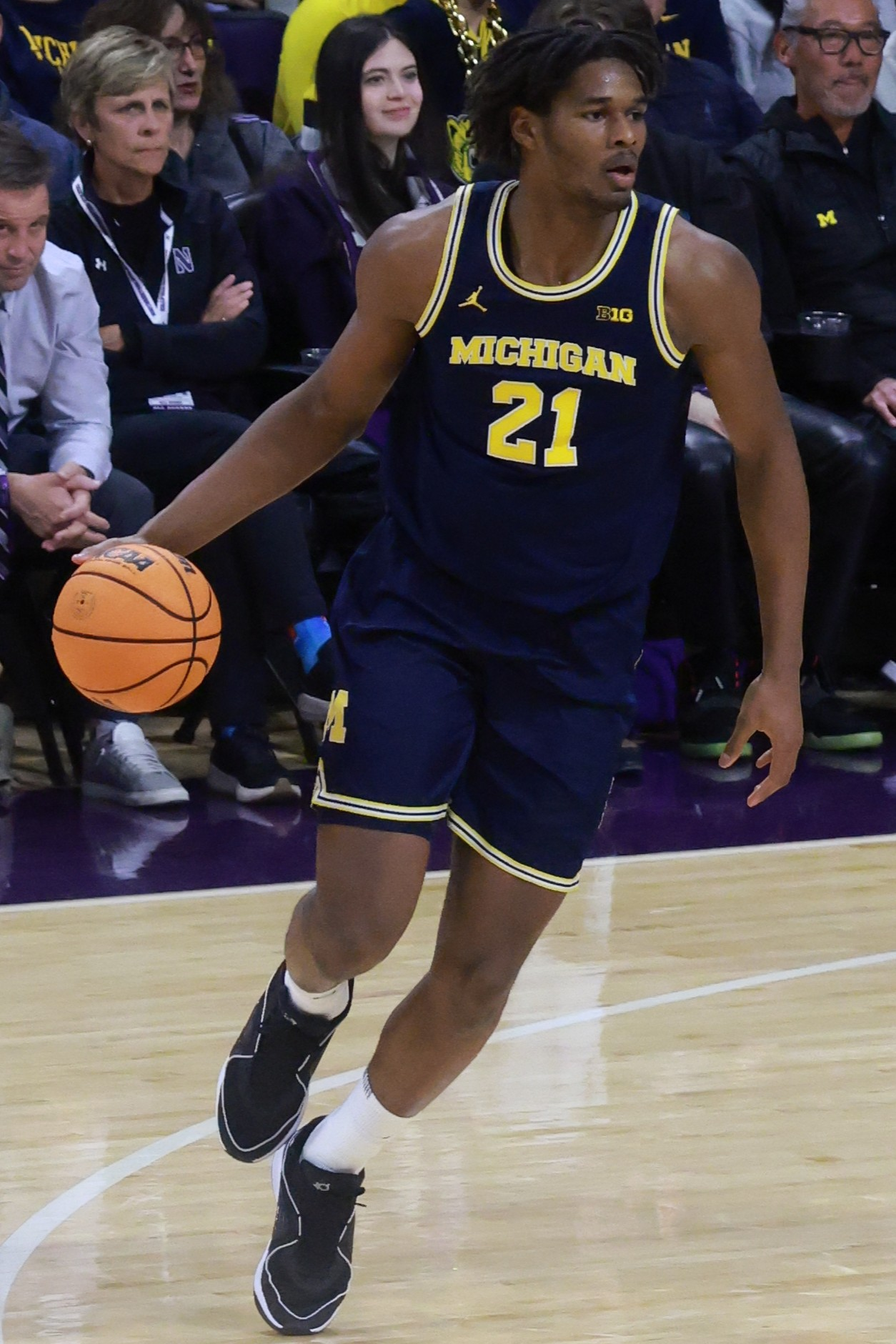
Morez Johnson Jr. was selected 9th overall by the Dallas Mavericks.

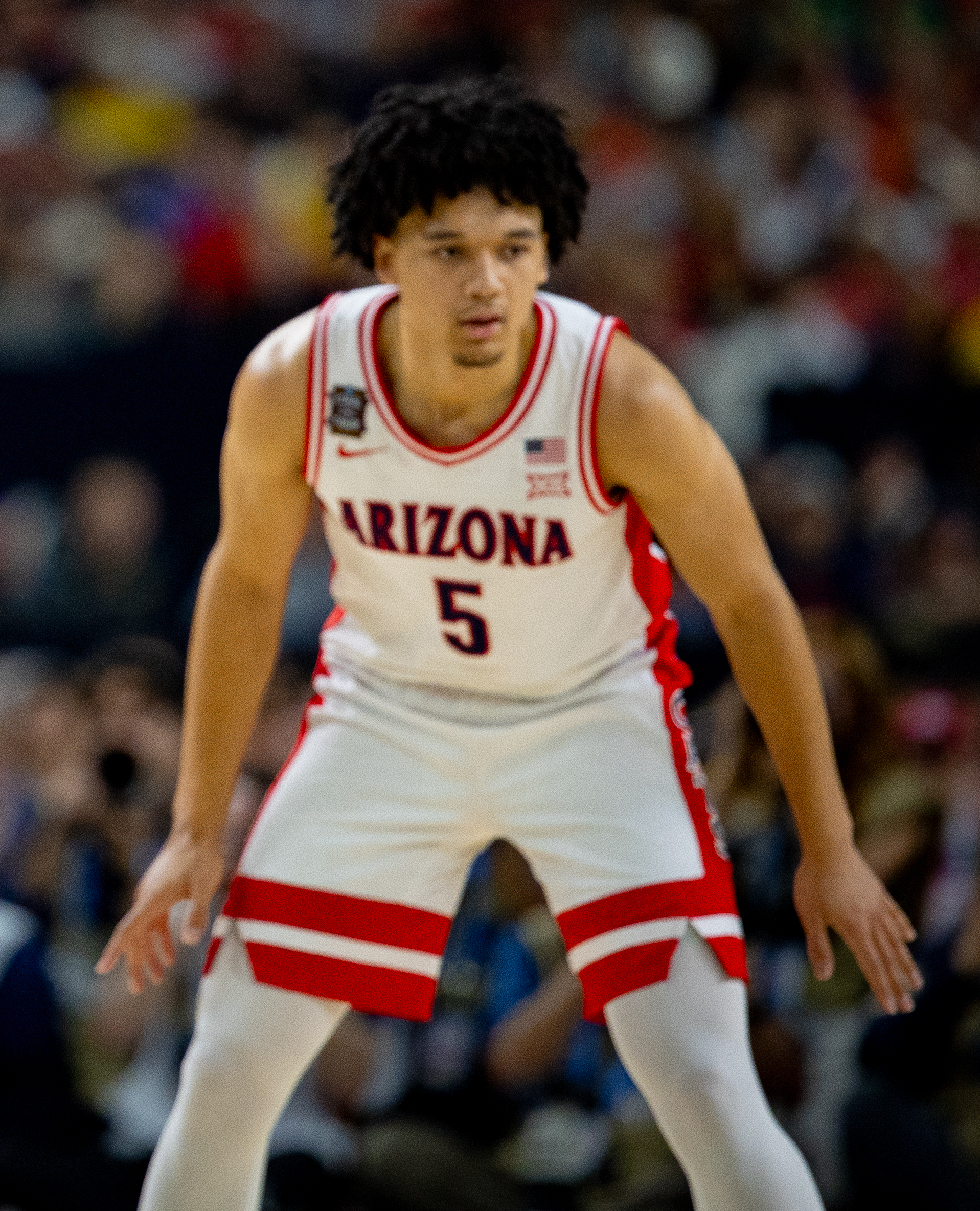
Brayden Burries was selected 10th overall by the Milwaukee Bucks.

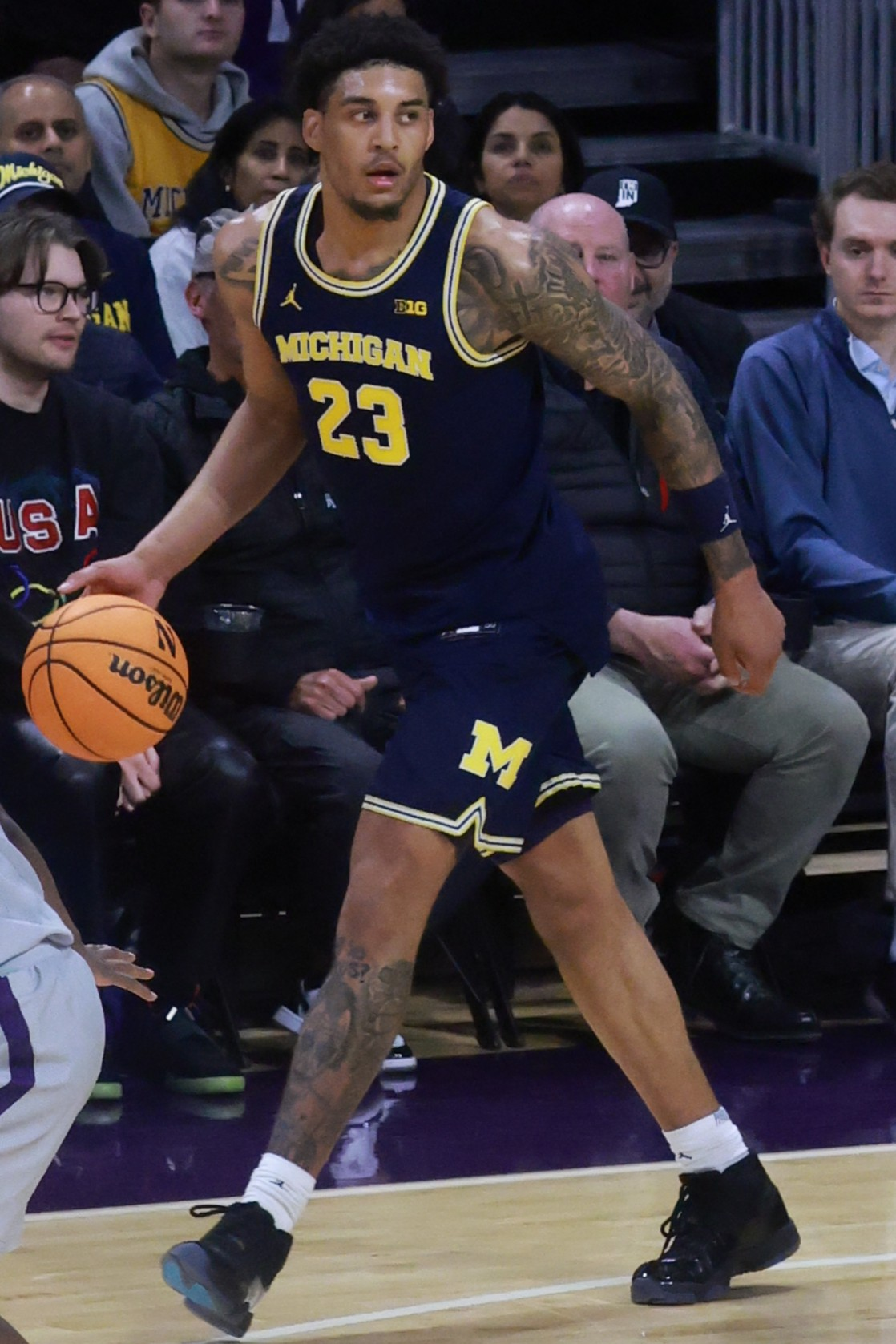
Yaxel Lendeborg was selected 11th overall by the Golden State Warriors.

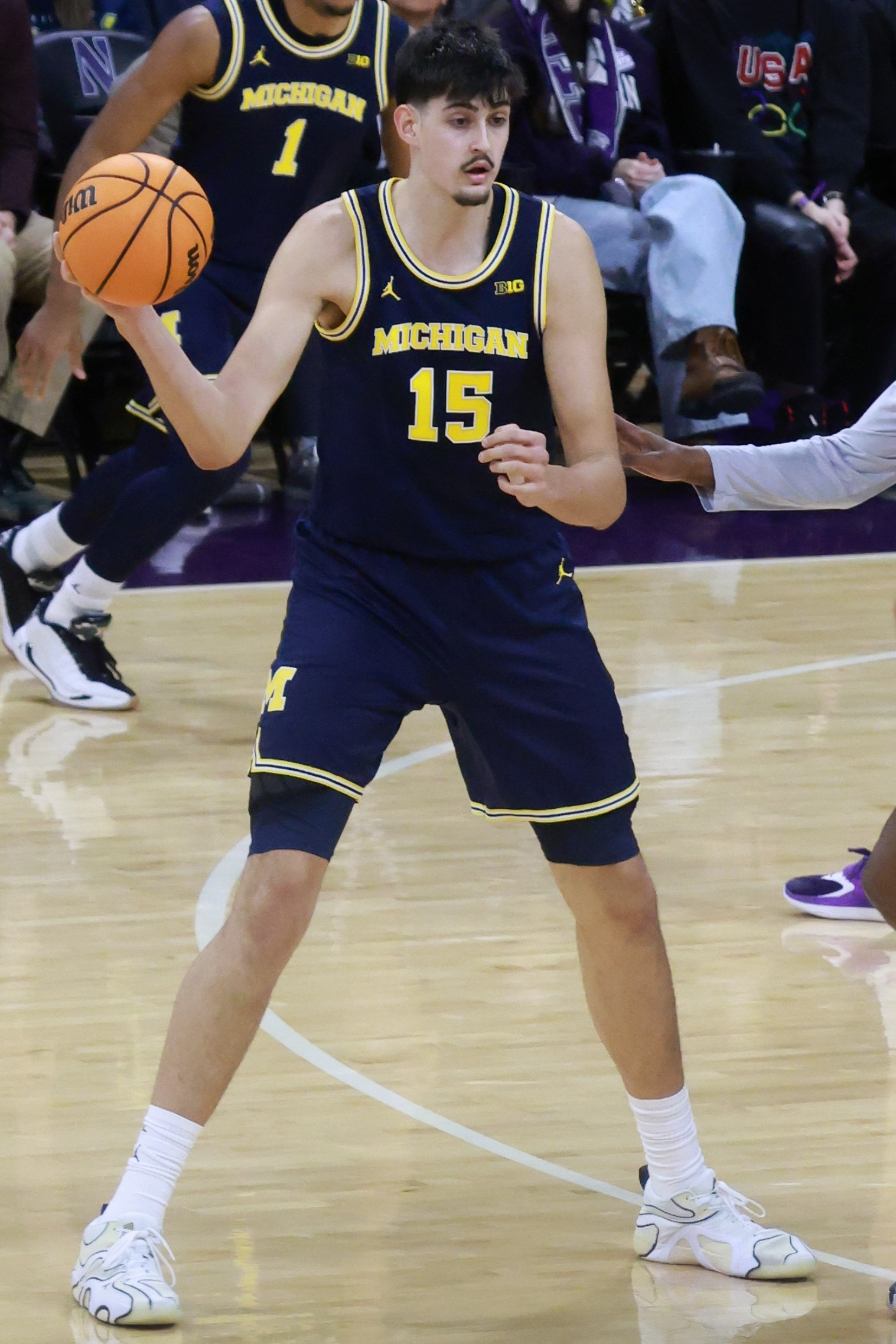
Aday Mara was selected 12th overall by the Oklahoma City Thunder.

Rnd.	Pick	Player	Pos.	Nationality (Note: Nationality indicates the player's national team or representative nationality. If a player has not competed at the international level, then the nationality indicates the national team which the player is eligible to represent according to FIBA rules.)	Team	School / club team
1	1	AJ Dybantsa	SF	United States	Washington Wizards	BYU (Fr.)
1	2	Darryn Peterson	SG/PG	United States	Utah Jazz	Kansas (Fr.)
1	3	Cameron Boozer	PF	United States	Memphis Grizzlies	Duke (Fr.)
1	4	Caleb Wilson	SF/PF	United States	Chicago Bulls	North Carolina (Fr.)
1	5	Keaton Wagler	SG/PG	United States	Los Angeles Clippers (from Indiana) (Note: February 5, 2026: Indiana Pacers to Los Angeles Clippers: L.A. Clippers acquired Bennedict Mathurin, Isaiah Jackson, 2026 and 2029 IND first-round picks, and 2028 DAL second-round pick; Indiana acquired Ivica Zubac and Kobe Brown)	Illinois (Fr.)
1	6	Mikel Brown Jr.	PG	United States	Brooklyn Nets	Louisville (Fr.)
1	7	Darius Acuff Jr.	PG	United States	Sacramento Kings	Arkansas (Fr.)
1	8	Kingston Flemings	PG	United States	Atlanta Hawks (from New Orleans) (Note: June 25, 2025: New Orleans Pelicans to Atlanta Hawks: New Orleans acquired draft rights to Derik Queen; Atlanta acquired draft rights to Asa Newell and 2026 first-round pick)	Houston (Fr.)
1	9	Morez Johnson Jr.	PF/C	United States	Dallas Mavericks	Michigan (So.)
1	10	Brayden Burries	SG/PG	United States	Milwaukee Bucks	Arizona (Fr.)
1	11	Yaxel Lendeborg	PF	Dominican Republic (Note: Lendeborg was born in Puerto Rico to parents from the Dominican Republic. He holds dual American and Dominican citizenship but intends to play for the Dominican Republic national team.)	Golden State Warriors	Michigan (Sr.)
1	12	Aday Mara	C	Spain	Oklahoma City Thunder (from L.A. Clippers) (Note: July 10, 2019: Los Angeles Clippers to Oklahoma City Thunder: Oklahoma City acquired Shai Gilgeous-Alexander; Danilo Gallinari; 2022, 2024, and 2026 first-round picks; 2021 and 2023 MIA first-round picks; and right to swap 2023 and 2025 first-round picks; L.A. Clippers acquired Paul George)	Michigan (Jr.)
1	13	Nate Ament	SF	United States	Miami Heat (traded to Milwaukee) (Note: July 6, 2026: Miami Heat to Milwaukee Bucks: Milwaukee acquired Tyler Herro, Kel'el Ware, Jaime Jaquez Jr., Kasparas Jakučionis, draft rights to Nate Ament (No. 13 pick), first-round picks in 2031 and 2033, pick swap in 2030, second-round pick in 2033; Miami acquired Giannis Antetokounmpo and Bobby Portis)	Tennessee (Fr.)
1	14	Hannes Steinbach	PF	Germany	Charlotte Hornets	Washington (Fr.)
1	15	Dailyn Swain	SG/SF	United States	Chicago Bulls (from Portland) (Note: August 28, 2021: Portland Trail Blazers to Chicago Bulls (three-team trade with Cleveland): Portland acquired Larry Nance Jr.; Cleveland acquired Lauri Markkanen (sign-and-trade); Chicago acquired Derrick Jones Jr., 2023 DEN protected second-round pick, and 2026 POR first-round pick)	Texas (Jr.)
1	16	Bennett Stirtz	PG	United States	Memphis Grizzlies (from Phoenix via Orlando, (Note: July 17, 2023: Phoenix Suns to Orlando Magic: Orlando acquired 2026 first-round pick swap; Phoenix acquired 2024 DEN second-round pick, 2026 second-round pick, and 2028 BOS protected second-round pick; June 27, 2025: Orlando Magic to Memphis Grizzlies: Memphis acquired Kentavious Caldwell-Pope; Cole Anthony; 2025, 2028, and 2030 ORL first-round picks; 2026 first-round pick; and 2029 ORL first-round pick swap; Orlando acquired Desmond Bane) traded to Oklahoma City) (Note: June 23, 2026: Memphis Grizzlies to Oklahoma City Thunder: Memphis acquired draft rights to Ebuka Okorie (No. 17 pick) and two second-round picks; Oklahoma City acquired draft rights to Bennett Stirtz (No. 16 pick))	Iowa (Sr.)
1	17	Ebuka Okorie	PG	United States	Oklahoma City Thunder (from Philadelphia, (Note: December 8, 2020: Philadelphia 76ers to Oklahoma City Thunder: Oklahoma City acquired Al Horford, rights to Théo Maledon, rights to Vasilije Micić (2014 No. 52), 2026 PHI protected first-round pick; Philadelphia acquired Terrance Ferguson, Danny Green, and Vincent Poirier) traded to Detroit via Memphis) (Note: June 23, 2026: Memphis Grizzlies to Detroit Pistons: Memphis acquired draft rights to Karim López (No. 21 pick) and three second-round picks; Detroit acquired draft rights to Ebuka Okorie (No. 17 pick))	Stanford (Fr.)
1	18	Christian Anderson Jr.	PG	Germany (Note: Anderson was born in the United States to a German father. He has played for the Germany national team.)	Charlotte Hornets (from Orlando via Phoenix) (Note: February 7, 2025: Phoenix Suns to Charlotte Hornets: Charlotte acquired Jusuf Nurkić and 2026 first-round pick; Phoenix acquired Vasilije Micić, Cody Martin, and 2026 second-round pick)	Texas Tech (So.)
1	19	Allen Graves	PF	United States	Toronto Raptors	Santa Clara (Fr.)
1	20	Jayden Quaintance^{#}	PF/C	United States	San Antonio Spurs (from Atlanta) (Note: June 30, 2022: Atlanta Hawks to San Antonio Spurs: San Antonio acquired Danilo Gallinari, 2023, 2025, and 2027 first-round picks, and rights to swap 2026 first-round picks; Atlanta acquired Dejounte Murray and Jock Landale)	Kentucky (So.)
1	21	Karim López	SF	Mexico	Detroit Pistons (from Minnesota, (Note: February 3, 2026: Minnesota Timberwolves to Detroit Pistons (three-team trade with Chicago): Detroit acquired Kevin Huerter, Dario Šarić, and 2026 MIN first-round pick swap; Chicago acquired Mike Conley Jr. and Jaden Ivey; Minnesota acquired cash considerations) traded to Memphis)	New Zealand Breakers (New Zealand)
1	22	Labaron Philon Jr.	PG	United States	Philadelphia 76ers (from Houston via Oklahoma City) (Note: July 16, 2019: Houston Rockets to Oklahoma City Thunder: acquired Russell Westbrook; Oklahoma City acquired Chris Paul, limited right to swap 2021 and 2025 first-round picks, 2024 and 2026 HOU protected first-round picks; February 4, 2026: Oklahoma City Thunder to Philadelphia 76ers: Oklahoma City acquired Jared McCain; Philadelphia acquired 2026 HOU first-round pick, 2027 second-round pick, 2028 MIL and OKC second-round picks)	Alabama (So.)
1	23	Zuby Ejiofor	PF	United States	Atlanta Hawks (from Cleveland) (Note: February 7, 2025: Atlanta Hawks to Cleveland Cavaliers: Cleveland acquired De'Andre Hunter; Atlanta acquired Caris LeVert; Georges Niang; 2026 and 2028 first-round pick swaps; and 2027, 2029, and 2031 second-round picks)	St. John's (Sr.)
1	24	Cameron Carr	SG	United States	New York Knicks (traded to the L.A. Lakers) (Note: June 24, 2026: New York Knicks to Los Angeles Lakers (four-team trade with Dallas and Phoenix): L.A. Lakers acquired Cameron Carr (No. 24 pick); New York acquired the No. 47 pick (Tyler Nickel), draft rights to Melvin Ajinça, four future 2nd-round picks (two each from Dallas and Phoenix), and cash considerations (from LA); Dallas acquired Sergio de Larrea (No. 25 pick); Phoenix acquired Koa Peat (No. 30 pick))	Baylor (So.)
1	25	Sergio de Larrea	PG/SG	Spain	Los Angeles Lakers (traded to Dallas)	Valencia (Spain)
1	26	Tarris Reed Jr.	C	United States	Denver Nuggets (traded to San Antonio) (Note: June 24, 2026: Denver Nuggets to San Antonio Spurs: Denver acquired draft rights to Trevon Brazile (No. 35 UTA pick), 2028 MIN second-round pick, and 2031 SAC second-round pick; San Antonio acquired draft rights to Tarris Reed (No. 26 pick))	UConn (Sr.)
1	27	Chris Cenac Jr.	PF/C	United States	Boston Celtics	Houston (Fr.)
1	28	Joshua Jefferson	PF/SF	United States	Minnesota Timberwolves (from Detroit, traded to Brooklyn) (Note: July 10, 2026: Minnesota Timberwolves to Brooklyn Nets (four-team trade with Charlotte and Chicago): Brooklyn acquired Julius Randle and the draft rights to Joshua Jefferson (No. 28 pick); Minnesota acquired LaMelo Ball, Josh Green and the draft rights to Isaiah Evans (No. 33 pick); Chicago acquired Nic Claxton; Charlotte acquired Naz Reid, Mo Gueye, the draft rights to Matteo Spagnolo, 2033 first-round pick, three future first-round pick swaps (via Timberwolves), second-round picks in 2029, 2032 and 2033)	Iowa State (Sr.)
1	29	Alex Karaban	SF/PF	United States	Cleveland Cavaliers (from San Antonio via Atlanta, traded to Sacramento) (Note: June 23, 2026: Cleveland Cavaliers to Sacramento Kings: Cleveland acquired draft rights to Meleek Thomas (No. 34 pick) and 2032 second-round pick; Sacramento acquired draft rights to Alex Karaban (No. 29 pick))	UConn (Sr.)
1	30	Koa Peat	PF	United States	Dallas Mavericks (from Oklahoma City, Washington and Philadelphia (Note: November 1, 2023: Oklahoma City Thunder to Philadelphia 76ers (three-team trade with L.A. Clippers): Philadelphia acquired Marcus Morris, Nicolas Batum, Robert Covington, Kenyon Martin Jr., 2024 TOR first- and second-round picks, 2024 second-round pick, 2026 OKC first-round pick, 2028 LAC first-round pick, 2029 LAC first-round pick swap and second-round pick; Oklahoma City acquired 2027 LAC first-round pick swap; L.A. Clippers acquired James Harden, P. J. Tucker, and Filip Petrušev; February 6, 2025: Philadelphia 76ers to Washington Wizards: Washington acquired Reggie Jackson and 2026 OKC first-round pick; Philadelphia acquired Jared Butler, 2027 and 2030 second-round picks, 2028 GSW second-round pick, and 2030 WAS second-round pick; February 5, 2026: Washington Wizards to Dallas Mavericks (three-team trade with Charlotte): Dallas acquired Khris Middleton, AJ Johnson, Tyus Jones, Marvin Bagley III, 2026 OKC first-round pick, 2026 PHX second-round pick, 2027 CHI second-round pick, 2029 HOU second-round pick, 2030 GSW first-round pick; Washington acquired Anthony Davis, Jaden Hardy, D'Angelo Russell, Dante Exum; Charlotte acquired Malaki Branham), traded to Phoenix)	Arizona (Fr.)
2	31	Bruce Thornton	PG	United States	New York Knicks (from Washington via Oklahoma City and Houston, (Note: December 2, 2020: Washington Wizards to Houston Rockets: Washington acquired Russell Westbrook; Houston acquired John Wall, 2026 and 2027 WAS second-round picks; July 30, 2021: Houston Rockets to Oklahoma City Thunder: Houston acquired draft rights to Alperen Şengün; Oklahoma City acquired 2026 and 2027 WAS second-round picks; June 24, 2022: Oklahoma City Thunder to New York Knicks: Oklahoma City acquired draft rights to Ousmane Dieng; New York acquired 2023 DEN and DET protected first-round picks, 2026 and 2027 WAS second-round picks) traded to Houston) (Note: June 24, 2026: New York Knicks to Houston Rockets (four-team trade with Detroit and L.A. Clippers): Houston acquired the draft rights to Bruce Thornton (No. 31 pick) and cash considerations; New York acquired the draft rights to Jack Kayil (No. 39 pick) and Mojave King, 2029 SAC second-round pick, and cash considerations; Detroit acquired the draft rights to Ugonna Onyenso (No. 53 pick); L.A. Clippers acquired the draft rights to Nick Martinelli (No. 55 pick))	Ohio State (Sr.)
2	32	Richie Saunders^{#}	SG	United States	Memphis Grizzlies (from Indiana via Milwaukee) (Note: July 30, 2021: Indiana Pacers to Milwaukee Bucks: Milwaukee acquired Sandro Mamukelashvili, Georgios Kalaitzakis, and two second-round picks; Indiana acquired Isaiah Todd; August 7, 2021: Milwaukee Bucks to Memphis Grizzlies: Memphis acquired Sam Merrill and two second-round picks; Milwaukee acquired Grayson Allen and cash considerations)	BYU (Sr.)
2	33	Isaiah Evans	SF	United States	Brooklyn Nets (traded to Minnesota)	Duke (So.)
2	34	Meleek Thomas	SG/PG	United States	Sacramento Kings (traded to Cleveland)	Arkansas (Fr.)
2	35	Trevon Brazile	PF	United States	San Antonio Spurs (from Utah via Minnesota, (Note: February 9, 2023: Utah Jazz to Minnesota Timberwolves (three-team trade with LA Lakers): Utah acquired Damian Jones, Juan Toscano-Anderson, Russell Westbrook, and 2027 LAL protected first-round pick; L.A. Lakers acquired Malik Beasley, D'Angelo Russell, and Jarred Vanderbilt; Minnesota acquired Nickeil Alexander-Walker, Mike Conley, 2024 second-round pick, 2025 and 2026 UTA second-round picks; June 23, 2023: Minnesota Timberwolves to San Antonio Spurs: Minnesota acquired draft rights to Leonard Miller; San Antonio acquired 2026 UTA second-round pick and 2028 MIN second-round pick) traded to Denver)	Arkansas (Sr.)
2	36	Baba Miller	SF	Spain	Los Angeles Clippers (from Memphis via Utah and Atlanta) (Note: August 7, 2021: Memphis Grizzlies to Utah Jazz: Utah acquired draft rights to Jared Butler and two second-round picks; Memphis acquired draft rights to Santi Aldama; July 7, 2023: Utah Jazz to Atlanta Hawks: Atlanta acquired Rudy Gay and second-round pick; Utah acquired John Collins; February 6, 2025: Atlanta Hawks to Los Angeles Clippers: L.A. Clippers acquired Bogdan Bogdanović and three second-round picks; Atlanta acquired Bones Hyland and Terance Mann)	Cincinnati (Sr.)
2	37	Ryan Conwell	SG	United States	Oklahoma City Thunder (from Dallas, (Note: November 27, 2020: Dallas Mavericks to Oklahoma City Thunder (three-team trade with Detroit): Dallas acquired James Johnson; Detroit acquired Delon Wright; Oklahoma City acquired Trevor Ariza, Justin Jackson, 2023 second-round pick, and 2026 DAL second-round pick) traded to Miami) (Note: June 24, 2026: Oklahoma City Thunder to Miami Heat: Miami acquired the draft rights to Ryan Conwell (No. 37 pick); Oklahoma City acquired the draft rights to Otega Oweh (No. 41 pick) and cash considerations)	Louisville (Sr.)
2	38	Braden Smith	PG	United States	Chicago Bulls (from New Orleans via Boston, Detroit, and Portland, (Note: November 27, 2020: New Orleans Pelicans to Portland Trail Blazers: New Orleans acquired CJ McCollum, Larry Nance Jr., and Tony Snell; Portland acquired Nickeil Alexander-Walker, Josh Hart, Didi Louzada, Tomáš Satoranský, 2022 protected first-round pick, 2026 and 2027 second-round picks; July 6, 2022: Portland Trail Blazers to Detroit Pistons: Portland acquired Jerami Grant and draft rights to Ismaël Kamagate; Detroit acquired draft rights to Gabriele Procida, 2025 MIL protected first-round pick, 2025 DET second-round pick, and 2026 second-round pick; June 28, 2023: Detroit Pistons to Boston Celtics: Detroit acquired draft rights to Marcus Sasser; Boston acquired draft rights to James Nnaji, 2025 and 2026 second-round picks; February 5, 2026: Boston Celtics to Chicago Bulls: Boston acquired Nikola Vučević and 2027 DEN second-round pick; Chicago acquired draft rights to Anfernee Simons and 2026 second-round pick) traded to Indiana) (Note: June 24, 2026: Chicago Bulls to Indiana Pacers: Indiana acquired draft rights to Braden Smith (No. 38 pick); Chicago acquired Kam Jones, two future second-round pick swaps, and cash considerations)	Purdue (Sr.)
2	39	Jack Kayil^{#}	PG	Germany	Houston Rockets (from Chicago via Washington, (Note: June 28, 2023: Chicago Bulls to Washington Wizards: Chicago acquired draft rights to Julian Phillips; Washington acquired 2026 and 2027 second-round picks; July 6, 2025: Washington Wizards to Houston Rockets (three-team trade with New Orleans): Washington acquired CJ McCollum, Kelly Olynyk, and Cam Whitmore; New Orleans acquired Saddiq Bey, Jordan Poole, and draft rights to Micah Peavy; Houston acquired 2026 CHI second-round pick, 2029 SAC second-round pick, and draft rights to Mojave King (2023 No. 47)) traded to New York)	Alba Berlin (Germany)
2	40	Dillon Mitchell	SF	United States	Boston Celtics (from Milwaukee via Orlando) (Note: November 18, 2020: Milwaukee Bucks to Orlando Magic: Milwaukee acquired 2020 second-round pick; Orlando acquired 2022 IND protected second-round pick and 2026 second-round pick; June 26, 2025: Orlando Magic to Boston Celtics: Orlando acquired draft rights to Noah Penda; Boston acquired draft rights to Max Shulga and Amari Williams, 2026 MIL second-round pick, and 2027 second-round pick)	St. John's (Sr.)
2	41	Otega Oweh^{#}	SG	United States	Miami Heat (from Golden State via Charlotte, New York, Oklahoma City, and Atlanta, (Note: July 8, 2019: Golden State Warriors to Atlanta Hawks: Atlanta acquired Damian Jones and 2026 GSW second-round pick; Golden State acquired Omari Spellman; July 12, 2023: Atlanta Hawks to Oklahoma City Thunder: Oklahoma City acquired Usman Garuba, Rudy Gay, TyTy Washington Jr., and 2026 GSW second-round pick; Atlanta acquired Patty Mills; June 27, 2024: Oklahoma City Thunder to New York Knicks: New York acquired five second-round picks; Oklahoma City acquired draft rights to Dillon Jones; October 2, 2024: New York Knicks to Charlotte Hornets (three-team trade with Minnesota): Charlotte acquired Charlie Brown, DaQuan Jeffries, Duane Washington Jr., and three second-round picks; New York acquired Karl-Anthony Towns and draft rights to James Nnaji; Minnesota acquired Julius Randle, Donte DiVincenzo, Keita Bates-Diop, and DET first-round pick; January 23, 2024: Charlotte Hornets to Miami Heat (trade amended on March 9, 2026): Miami acquired Terry Rozier and 2026 GSW second-round pick; Charlotte acquired Kyle Lowry and 2027 MIA protected first-round pick) traded to Oklahoma City)	Kentucky (Sr.)
2	42	Ja'Kobi Gillespie	PG	United States	San Antonio Spurs (from Portland via New Orleans) (Note: July 30, 2021: Portland Trail Blazers to New Orleans Pelicans: Portland acquired draft rights to Greg Brown; New Orleans acquired 2026 second-round pick and cash considerations; February 9, 2023: New Orleans Pelicans to San Antonio Spurs: New Orleans acquired Josh Richardson; San Antonio acquired Devonte' Graham; 2024, 2028, and 2029 second-round picks; and 2026 CHA second-round pick)	Tennessee (Sr.)
2	43	Tyler Bilodeau^{#}	PF	United States	Brooklyn Nets (from LA Clippers via Houston) (Note: February 9, 2023: Los Angeles Clippers to Houston Rockets (three-team trade with Memphis): Houston acquired John Wall, Danny Green, and LAC second-round pick swap; L.A. Clippers acquired Eric Gordon and three second-round picks; Memphis acquired Luke Kennard; July 6, 2025: Houston Rockets to Brooklyn Nets (seven-team trade with Phoenix, Atlanta, Golden State, Minnesota, L.A. Lakers): Brooklyn acquired 2026 LAC second-round pick and 2030 BOS second-round pick; Houston acquired Kevin Durant and Clint Capela; Phoenix acquired Jalen Green, Dillon Brooks, Daeqwon Plowden, Khaman Maluach, Rasheer Fleming, Koby Brea, 2026 PHI second-round pick, and 2032 second-round pick; Atlanta acquired David Roddy and 2031 HOU second-round pick swap; Golden State acquired Alex Toohey and Jahmai Mashack; Minnesota acquired Rocco Zikarsky, 2026 and 2032 second-round picks; L.A. Lakers acquired Adou Thiero)	UCLA (Sr.)
2	44	Maliq Brown	PF	United States	San Antonio Spurs (from Miami via Indiana) (Note: July 6, 2019: Miami Heat to Indiana Pacers (three-team trade with Phoenix): Indiana acquired TJ Warren, 2022, 2025, and 2026 MIA second-round picks; Miami acquired 2019 PHX second-round pick; Phoenix acquired cash considerations; August 8, 2021: Indiana Pacers to San Antonio Spurs: San Antonio acquired Doug McDermott, 2023 second-round pick, and 2026 second-round pick swap; Indiana acquired 2023 second-round pick; June 23, 2022: Indiana Pacers to Minnesota Timberwolves: Minnesota acquired 2026 SAS second-round pick; Indiana acquired Kendall Brown)	Duke (Sr.)
2	45	Emanuel Sharp	SG	Israel (Note: Sharp was born in Israel to an American-born father and Canadian-born mother who are naturalized Israeli citizens. He holds Israeli, American and Canadian citizenship. Sharp played for the Israel under-16 basketball team.)	Sacramento Kings (from Charlotte via San Antonio, Atlanta, and New York) (Note: July 29, 2021: Charlotte Hornets to New York Knicks: Charlotte acquired draft rights to Kai Jones; New York acquired 2026 second-round pick; January 13, 2022: New York Knicks to Atlanta Hawks: New York acquired Solomon Hill, Cam Reddish, 2025 BKN second-round pick, and cash considerations; Atlanta acquired Kevin Knox II and 2026 CHA second-round pick; June 30, 2022: Atlanta Hawks to San Antonio Spurs: Atlanta acquired Dejounte Murray and Jock Landale; San Antonio acquired Danilo Gallinari, 2025 and 2027 ATL first-round picks, right to swap 2026 first-round picks, and 2026 CHA second-round pick; February 3, 2025: San Antonio Spurs to Sacramento Kings (three-team trade with Chicago): San Antonio acquired De'Aaron Fox and Jordan McLaughlin; Chicago acquired Zach Collins, Kevin Huerter, and Tre Jones; Sacramento acquired Sidy Cissoko, Zach LaVine, 2025 CHI second-round pick, 2026 CHA second-round pick, 2027 SAS first-round pick, 2028 DEN protected second-round pick, 2028 SAC second-round pick, and 2031 MIN first-round pick)	Houston (Sr.)
2	46	Felix Okpara	C	Nigeria	Orlando Magic (traded to Washington) (Note: June 24, 2026: Orlando Magic to Washington Wizards (three-team trade with Milwaukee): Washington acquired the draft rights to Felix Okpara (No. 46 pick); Orlando acquired the draft rights to Izaiyah Nelson (No. 51 pick) and cash considerations; Milwaukee acquired the draft rights to Malique Lewis (No. 60 pick))	Tennessee (Sr.)
2	47	Tyler Nickel^{#}	SG	United States	Phoenix Suns (from Philadelphia via Houston and Oklahoma City, (Note: March 25, 2021: Philadelphia 76ers to Oklahoma City Thunder (three-team trade with New York): Oklahoma City acquired Austin Rivers, Tony Bradley, 2025 and 2026 PHI second-round picks; Philadelphia acquired George Hill and Ignas Brazdeikis; New York acquired Terrance Ferguson, Vincent Poirier, draft rights to Emir Preldžić, 2021 second-round pick, and 2024 protected second-round pick; September 29, 2022: Oklahoma City Thunder to Houston Rockets: Houston acquired Derrick Favors, Moe Harkless, Ty Jerome, Théo Maledon, 2026 second-round pick, and cash considerations; Oklahoma City acquired Sterling Brown, Trey Burke, Marquese Chriss, and David Nwaba; July 6, 2025: Houston Rockets to Phoenix Suns (seven-team trade with Brooklyn, Atlanta, Golden State, Minnesota, L.A. Lakers): Phoenix acquired Jalen Green, Dillon Brooks, Daeqwon Plowden, Khaman Maluach, Rasheer Fleming, Koby Brea, 2026 PHI second-round pick, and 2032 second-round pick; Houston acquired Kevin Durant and Clint Capela; Brooklyn acquired 2026 LAC second-round pick and 2030 BOS second-round pick; Atlanta acquired David Roddy and 2031 HOU second-round pick swap; Golden State acquired Alex Toohey and Jahmai Mashack; Minnesota acquired Rocco Zikarsky, 2026 and 2032 second-round picks; L.A. Lakers acquired Adou Thiero) traded to New York)	Vanderbilt (Sr.)
2	48	Tobi Lawal	PF	United Kingdom	Dallas Mavericks (from Phoenix via Washington) (Note: June 24, 2023: Phoenix Suns to Washington Wizards (three-team trade with Indiana): Phoenix acquired Bradley Beal, Jordan Goodwin, and Isaiah Todd; Indiana acquired draft rights to Jarace Walker, 2028 PHX second-round pick, and 2029 WAS second-round pick; Washington acquired Chris Paul; Landry Shamet; draft rights to Bilal Coulibaly; protected right to swap 2024 first-round picks; 2024, 2026, 2027, and 2030 PHX second-round picks; right to swap 2026, 2028, and 2030 first-round picks; and cash considerations; February 5, 2026: Washington Wizards to Dallas Mavericks (three-team trade with Charlotte): Washington acquired Anthony Davis, Danté Exum, Jaden Hardy, and D'Angelo Russell; Charlotte acquired Malaki Branham; Dallas acquired Marvin Bagley III, AJ Johnson, Tyus Jones, Khris Middleton, 2026 first-round pick, 2026 PHX second-round pick, 2027 CHI second-round pick, 2029 HOU second-round pick, and 2030 GSW protected first-round pick)	Virginia Tech (Sr.)
2	49	Bryce Hopkins	SF	United States	Denver Nuggets (from Atlanta via Brooklyn and Golden State) (Note: February 9, 2023: Atlanta Hawks to Golden State Warriors (four-team trade with Detroit and Portland): Golden State acquired Gary Payton II and two ATL second-round picks; Atlanta acquired Saddiq Bey; Detroit acquired James Wiseman; Portland acquired Kevin Knox and five second-round picks; December 15, 2024: Golden State Warriors to Brooklyn Nets: Brooklyn acquired De'Anthony Melton, Reece Beekman, 2026 and 2028 ATL second-round picks, and 2029 GSW second-round pick; Golden State acquired Dennis Schröder and 2025 MIA second-round pick; February 5, 2026: Brooklyn Nets to Denver Nuggets: Denver acquired 2026 ATL second-round pick; Brooklyn acquired Hunter Tyson and 2032 second-round pick)	St. John's (Sr.)
2	50	Jaden Bradley	PG	United States	Toronto Raptors	Arizona (Sr.)
2	51	Izaiyah Nelson^{#}	PF/C	United States	Washington Wizards (from Minnesota via Detroit and New York, (Note: November 24, 2020: Minnesota Timberwolves to New York Knicks: New York acquired Omari Spellman, Jacob Evans, and 2026 MIN second-round pick; Minnesota acquired Ed Davis; July 11, 2022: New York Knicks to Detroit Pistons: Detroit acquired Alec Burks, Nerlens Noel, 2023 second-round pick, 2026 MIN second-round pick, and cash considerations; New York acquired Nikola Radičević and 2025 second-round pick; January 14, 2024: Detroit Pistons to Washington Wizards: Washington acquired Marvin Bagley III, Isaiah Livers, 2025 second-round pick, and 2026 MIN second-round pick; Detroit acquired Danilo Gallinari and Mike Muscala) traded to Orlando)	South Florida (Sr.)
2	52	Henri Veesaar^{#}	C	Estonia	Los Angeles Clippers (from Cleveland, (Note: February 4, 2026: Cleveland Cavaliers to Los Angeles Clippers: L.A. Clippers acquired Darius Garland and 2026 CLE second-round pick; Cleveland acquired James Harden) traded to Atlanta) (Note: June 24, 2026: Los Angeles Clippers to Atlanta Hawks: Atlanta acquired the draft rights to Henri Veesaar (No. 52 pick); L.A. Clippers acquired the draft rights to Narcisse Ngoy (No. 57 pick) and cash considerations)	North Carolina (Jr.)
2	53	Ugonna Onyenso^{#}	C	Nigeria	Houston Rockets (traded to Detroit)	Virginia (Sr.)
2	54	Lajae Jones^{#}	SG	United States	Golden State Warriors (from LA Lakers via Toronto, Miami, and Cleveland) (Note: November 23, 2020: Los Angeles Lakers to Cleveland Cavaliers: Cleveland acquired JaVale McGee and 2026 LAL second-round pick; L.A. Lakers acquired Alfonzo McKinnie and Jordan Bell; July 6, 2023: Cleveland Cavaliers to Miami Heat (three-team trade with San Antonio): Miami acquired 2026 LAL second-round pick and 2027 second-round pick; Cleveland acquired Max Strus; San Antonio acquired Cedi Osman, Lamar Stevens, 2026 OKC second-round pick, and 2030 second-round pick; February 6, 2025: Miami Heat to Toronto Raptors (five-team trade with Detroit, Golden State, Utah): Toronto acquired P. J. Tucker, 2026 LAL second-round pick, and cash considerations; Miami acquired Davion Mitchell, Andrew Wiggins, Kyle Anderson, and 2025 GSW first-round pick; Detroit acquired Dennis Schröder, Lindy Waters III, and 2029 GSW second-round pick; Golden State acquired Jimmy Butler, two second-round picks, and cash considerations; Utah acquired Josh Richardson, Kenyon Martin Jr., 2028 DET second-round pick, 2031 MIA second-round pick, and cash considerations; February 5, 2026: Toronto Raptors to Golden State Warriors: Golden State acquired 2026 LAL second-round pick; Toronto acquired Trayce Jackson-Davis)	Florida State (Sr.)
2	55	Nick Martinelli	SF	United States	New York Knicks (traded to L.A. Clippers)	Northwestern (Sr.)
2	56	Vsevolod Ishchenko^{#}	SF	Russia	Chicago Bulls (from Denver via Minnesota, Phoenix, Charlotte, and Phoenix, (Note: June 26, 2024: Denver Nuggets to Phoenix Suns: Denver acquired draft rights to DaRon Holmes II; Phoenix acquired draft rights to Ryan Dunn, 2024 MIN second-round pick, 2026 and 2031 DEN second-round picks; January 15, 2025: Phoenix Suns to Charlotte Hornets: Phoenix acquired Nick Richards and 2025 second-round pick; Charlotte acquired Josh Okogie, 2026 and 2031 DEN second-round picks, and 2031 PHO second-round pick; February 6, 2025: Charlotte Hornets to Phoenix Suns: Charlotte acquired Jusuf Nurkić and 2026 first-round pick; Phoenix acquired Cody Martin, Vasilije Micić, and 2026 second-round pick; July 6, 2025: Phoenix Suns to Minnesota Timberwolves (seven-team trade with Brooklyn, Atlanta, Golden State, Houston, L.A. Lakers): Phoenix acquired Jalen Green, Dillon Brooks, Daeqwon Plowden, Khaman Maluach, Rasheer Fleming, Koby Brea, 2026 PHI second-round pick, and 2032 second-round pick; Houston acquired Kevin Durant and Clint Capela; Brooklyn acquired 2026 LAC second-round pick and 2030 BOS second-round pick; Atlanta acquired David Roddy and 2031 HOU second-round pick swap; Golden State acquired Alex Toohey and Jahmai Mashack; Minnesota acquired Rocco Zikarsky, 2026 and 2031 second-round picks; L.A. Lakers acquired Adou Thiero; February 5, 2026: Minnesota Timberwolves to Chicago Bulls: Minnesota acquired Ayo Dosunmu and Julian Phillips; Chicago acquired Rob Dillingham; Leonard Miller; 2026, 2031, and 2032 second-round picks; and 2027 CLE second-round pick) traded to Dallas) (Note: June 26, 2026: Chicago Bulls to Dallas Mavericks (three-team trade with L.A. Lakers): Dallas acquired the draft rights to Vsevolod Ishchenko (No. 56 pick); Chicago received cash considerations; L.A. Lakers received cash considerations)	PBC Lokomotiv Kuban (Russia)
2	57	Narcisse Ngoy^{#}	C	France	Atlanta Hawks (from Boston, (Note: July 7, 2025: Boston Celtics to Atlanta Hawks (three-team trade with Brooklyn): Boston acquired Georges Niang, 2031 CLE second-round pick, and cash considerations; Brooklyn acquired Terance Mann and draft rights to Drake Powell; Atlanta acquired Kristaps Porziņģis and 2026 second-round pick) traded to L.A. Clippers)	Poitiers Basket 86 (France)
2	58	Jaron Pierre Jr.	SG	United States	New Orleans Pelicans (from Detroit via New York, Brooklyn, Phoenix, Orlando, and the LA Clippers) (Note: November 19, 2020: Detroit Pistons to Los Angeles Clippers (three-team trade with Brooklyn): Detroit acquired Rodney McGruder, Džanan Musa, draft rights to Saddiq Bey and Jaylen Hands (2019 No. 56), 2021 TOR second-round pick, and cash considerations; Brooklyn acquired Bruce Brown, Landry Shamet, and draft rights to Reggie Perry; L.A. Clippers acquired Luke Kennard; Justin Patton; draft rights to Jay Scrubb; 2023 POR second-round pick; and 2024, 2025, and 2026 DET second-round picks; July 29, 2021: Los Angeles Clippers to Orlando Magic: L.A. Clippers acquired draft rights to Jason Preston; Orlando acquired 2026 DET second-round pick and cash considerations; July 17, 2023: Orlando Magic to Phoenix Suns: Orlando acquired right to swap 2026 first-round picks; Phoenix acquired 2024 DEN second-round pick, 2026 second-round pick, and 2028 BOS protected second-round pick; February 8, 2024: Phoenix Suns to Brooklyn Nets (three-team trade with Memphis): Phoenix acquired Royce O'Neale and David Roddy; Memphis acquired Chimezie Metu, Yuta Watanabe, and right to swap 2026 first-round picks; Brooklyn acquired Keita Bates-Diop, Jordan Goodwin, draft rights to Vanja Marinković, 2026 second-round pick, 2028 and 2029 MEM second-round picks; July 6, 2024: Brooklyn Nets to New York Knicks: Brooklyn acquired Bojan Bogdanović; Mamadi Diakite; Shake Milton (sign-and-trade); 2025 MIL protected first-round pick; 2025, 2027, 2029, and 2031 NYK first-round picks; 2025 BKN second-round pick; and 2028 NYK first-round pick swap; New York acquired Keita Bates-Diop, Mikal Bridges, draft rights to Juan Pablo Vaulet (2015 No. 39), and 2026 second-round pick; February 5, 2026: New York Knicks to New Orleans Pelicans: New York acquired Jose Alvarado and draft rights to Latavious Williams (2010 No. 48); New Orleans acquired Dalen Terry, 2026 ans 2027 second-round picks, and cash considerations)	SMU (Sr.)
2	59	Trey Kaufman-Renn^{#}	PF	United States	Minnesota Timberwolves (from San Antonio via Indiana)	Purdue ([Sr.)
2	60	Malique Lewis^{#}	SF	Trinidad and Tobago	Washington Wizards (from Oklahoma City via San Antonio and Miami, (Note: February 9, 2022: Oklahoma City Thunder to Miami Heat: Miami acquired 2026 second-round pick; Oklahoma City acquired KZ Okpala; July 6, 2023: Miami Heat to San Antonio Spurs (three-team trade with Cleveland): San Antonio acquired Cedi Osman, Lamar Stevens, 2026 OKC second-round pick, and 2030 second-round pick; Miami acquired 2026 LAL second-round pick and 2027 second-round pick; Cleveland acquired Max Strus; July 9, 2025: San Antonio Spurs to Washington Wizards: Washington acquired Malaki Branham, Blake Wesley, and 2026 OKC second-round pick; San Antonio acquired Kelly Olynyk) traded to Milwaukee)	South East Melbourne Phoenix (Australia)

== Notable undrafted players ==
These players were not selected in the 2026 NBA draft, but have played at least one regular-season or playoff game in the NBA.

Player	Pos.	Nationality	School/club team
Tobe Awaka	PF	United States	Arizona (Sr.)
Carson Cooper	C	United States	Michigan State (Sr.)
Malik Dia	PF	United States	Ole Miss (Sr.)
Josh Dix	SG	United States	Creighton (Sr.)
Tre Donaldson	PG	United States	Miami (FL) (Sr.)
Graham Ike	PF/C	United States	Gonzaga (Sr.)
Jaylin Sellers	SG	United States	Providence (Sr.)

== Trades involving draft picks ==
=== Pre-draft trades ===
Prior to the draft, the following trades were made and resulted in exchanges of draft picks between teams:

=== Post-draft trades ===
Post-draft trades are made after the draft begins. These trades are usually not confirmed until the next day or after free agency officially begins.

== Combine ==
The 12th G League Elite Camp took place on May 8–10, from which certain participants were selected to join the main draft combine.

The primary portion of the 2026 NBA draft combine was held from May 10–17 in Chicago, Illinois.

== Draft lottery ==
External videos
- 2026 NBA Draft Lottery Drawing, NBA's official YouTube channel. May 10, 2026.

The NBA draft lottery was held on May 10. It also aired nationally on ESPN and ABC. This would end up being the last NBA draft lottery to utilize the 1,001 possible lottery results, with the upcoming 2027 NBA draft utilizing a new draft lottery system for not just the regular lottery teams, but also the 8th seed of the NBA playoffs for each conference as well.

Denotes the actual lottery result

Team	2025–26 record	Lottery chances	Lottery probabilities													
Team	2025–26 record	Lottery chances	1st	2nd	3rd	4th	5th	6th	7th	8th	9th	10th	11th	12th	13th	14th
Washington Wizards	17–65	140	14.0%	13.4%	12.7%	12.0%	47.9%	–	–	–	–	–	–	–	–	–
Indiana Pacers (to LA Clippers) (Note: The L.A. Clippers received the pick since it was outside the top 4. Indiana would have retained the pick had it not been between 5–9.)	19–63	140	14.0%	13.4%	12.7%	12.0%	27.8%	20.1%	–	–	–	–	–	–	–	–
Brooklyn Nets	20–62	140	14.0%	13.4%	12.7%	12.0%	14.8%	26.0%	7.0%	–	–	–	–	–	–	–
Utah Jazz	22–60	115	11.5%	11.4%	11.2%	11.0%	7.5%	27.1%	17.9%	2.4%	–	–	–	–	–	–
Sacramento Kings	22–60	115	11.5%	11.4%	11.2%	11.0%	2.0%	18.2%	25.5%	8.6%	0.6%	–	–	–	–	–
Memphis Grizzlies	25–57	90	9.0%	9.2%	9.4%	9.6%	–	8.6%	29.7%	20.6%	3.7%	0.2%	–	–	–	–
New Orleans Pelicans (to Atlanta)	26–56	68	6.8%	7.1%	7.5%	7.9%	–	–	19.8%	35.6%	13.8%	1.4%	<0.1%	–	–	–
Dallas Mavericks	26–56	67	6.7%	7.0%	7.4%	7.8%	–	–	–	32.9%	31.1%	6.6%	0.4%	<0.1%	–	–
Chicago Bulls	31–51	45	4.5%	4.8%	5.2%	5.7%	–	–	–	–	50.8%	25.9%	3.0%	0.1%	<0.1%	–
Milwaukee Bucks	32–50	30	3.0%	3.3%	3.6%	4.0%	–	–	–	–	–	65.9%	19.0%	1.2%	<0.1%	<0.1%
Golden State Warriors	37–45	20	2.0%	2.2%	2.4%	2.8%	–	–	–	–	–	–	77.6%	12.6%	0.4%	<0.1%
Los Angeles Clippers (to Oklahoma City)	42–40	15	1.5%	1.7%	1.9%	2.1%	–	–	–	–	–	–	–	86.1%	6.7%	0.1%
Miami Heat	43–39	10	1.0%	1.1%	1.2%	1.4%	–	–	–	–	–	–	–	–	92.9%	2.3%
Charlotte Hornets	44–38	5	0.5%	0.6%	0.6%	0.7%	–	–	–	–	–	–	–	–	–	97.6%

== Eligibility and entrants ==
The draft is conducted under the eligibility rules established in the league's 2023 collective bargaining agreement (CBA) with its players' union.

- All drafted players must be at least 19 years old during the calendar year of the draft. In terms of dates, players who were eligible for the 2026 NBA draft must have been born on or before December 31, 2007.
- Since the 2016 draft, the following rules are, as implemented by the NCAA Division I council for that division:
  - Declaration for the draft no longer results in automatic loss of college eligibility. As long as a player does not sign a contract with a professional team outside the NBA or sign with an agent, he retains college eligibility as long as he makes a timely withdrawal from the draft.
  - NCAA players now have 10 days after the end of the NBA draft combine to withdraw from the draft. Since the combine is normally held in mid-May, the current deadline is about five weeks after the previous mid-April deadline.
  - NCAA players may participate in the draft combine and are allowed to attend one tryout per year with each NBA team without losing college eligibility.
  - NCAA players may now enter and withdraw from the draft up to two times without loss of eligibility. Previously, the NCAA treated a second declaration of draft eligibility as a permanent loss of college eligibility.

=== Early entrants ===
Players who were not automatically eligible had to declare their eligibility for the draft by notifying the NBA offices in writing no later than at least 60 days before the event. For the 2026 draft, the date fell on April 24. Under the CBA a player may withdraw his name from consideration from the draft at any time before the final declaration deadline, which usually falls 10 days before the draft at 5:00 p.m. EDT (2100 UTC). Under current NCAA rules, players usually have until 10 days after the draft combine to withdraw from the draft and retain college eligibility.

A player who has hired an agent for purposes of negotiating with professional teams (Note: Due to changes in rules regarding student athlete compensation in the 2020s, players can hire agents to manage appearances and endorsements while retaining college athletic eligibility.) retains his remaining college eligibility regardless of whether he is drafted after an evaluation from the NBA Undergraduate Advisory Committee. Players who declare for the NBA draft and are not selected have the opportunity to return to their school for at least another year only after terminating all agreements with their agents, (Note: Specifically agents hired to negotiate with professional teams. Relationships with agents hired for other purposes are not affected.) who must have been certified.

On April 27, 2026, the NBA announced 71 players (60 college players and 11 international prospects) who filed as early entry candidates. On May 29, 38 early entry candidates withdrew their eligibility. On June 16, three more candidates withdrew their eligibility.

==== College underclassmen ====
- (United States) Darius Acuff Jr. – G, Arkansas (freshman)
- (United States) Nate Ament – F, Tennessee (freshman)
- (Germany) / (United States) Christian Anderson Jr. – G, Texas Tech (sophomore)
- (United States) Cameron Boozer – F, Duke (freshman)
- (United States) Mikel Brown Jr. – G, Louisville (freshman)
- (United States) Brayden Burries – G, Arizona (freshman)
- (United States) Cameron Carr – G, Baylor (sophomore)
- (United States) Chris Cenac Jr. – F/C, Houston (freshman)
- (United States) AJ Dybantsa – F, BYU (freshman)
- (United States) Isaiah Evans – F, Duke (sophomore)
- (United States) Kingston Flemings – G, Houston (freshman)
- (United States) Allen Graves – F, Santa Clara (freshman)
- (United States) Morez Johnson Jr. – F, Michigan (sophomore)
- (Spain) Aday Mara – C, Michigan (junior)
- (United States) Ebuka Okorie – G, Stanford (freshman)
- (United States) Koa Peat – F, Arizona (freshman)
- (United States) Darryn Peterson – G, Kansas (freshman)
- (United States) Labaron Philon Jr. – G, Alabama (sophomore)
- (United States) Jayden Quaintance – F/C, Kentucky (sophomore)
- (Germany) Hannes Steinbach – F, Washington (freshman)
- (United States) Dailyn Swain – G/F, Texas (junior)
- (United States) Meleek Thomas – G, Arkansas (freshman)
- (United States) Bryson Tucker – F, Washington (sophomore)
- (Estonia) Henri Veesaar – C, North Carolina (junior)
- (United States) Keaton Wagler – G, Illinois (freshman)
- (United States) Caleb Wilson – F, North Carolina (freshman)

==== International players ====
- (Iran) Mohammad Amini – G, SLUC Nancy Basket (France)
- Sergio de Larrea – G, Valencia Basket (Spain)
- Vsevolod Ishchenko – G, PBC Lokomotiv Kuban (Russia)
- Jack Kayil – G, Alba Berlin (Germany)
- (Mexico) Karim López – F, New Zealand Breakers (Australia)

=== Automatically eligible entrants ===
Players who do not meet the criteria for "international" players are automatically eligible if they meet any of the following criteria:

- They have no remaining college eligibility.
- If they graduated from high school in the U.S., but did not enroll in a U.S. college or university, four years have passed since their high school class graduated.
- They have signed a contract with a professional basketball team not in the NBA, anywhere in the world, and have played under the contract.

Players who meet the criteria for "international" players are automatically eligible if they meet any of the following criteria:

- They are at least 22 years old during the calendar year of the draft. In term of dates players born on or before December 31, 2004, are automatically eligible for the 2026 draft.
- They have signed a contract with a professional basketball team not in the NBA within the United States, and have played under that contract.

== Invited attendees ==
The NBA annually invites players to sit in the so-called "green room", a special room set aside at the draft site for the invited players plus their families and agents. Ever since the NBA transitioned itself to a two-day draft as of the previous year's draft, the NBA sends out its invitations in waves. The first wave was reported on June 9, with fourteen players confirmed to have received invitations.

- (United States) Darius Acuff Jr. – G, Arkansas
- (United States) Nate Ament – F, Tennessee
- (Germany) / (United States) Christian Anderson Jr. – G, Texas Tech
- (United States) Cameron Boozer – F, Duke
- (United States) Mikel Brown Jr. – G, Louisville
- (United States) Brayden Burries – G, Arizona
- (United States) AJ Dybantsa – F, BYU
- (United States) Kingston Flemings – G, Houston
- (Mexico) Karim López – F, New Zealand Breakers
- (Spain) Aday Mara – C, Michigan
- (United States) Darryn Peterson – G, Kansas
- (United States) Labaron Philon Jr. – G, Alabama
- (United States) Keaton Wagler – G, Illinois
- (United States) Caleb Wilson – F, North Carolina

A second group of invitees was announced on June 15.

- (United States) Cameron Carr – G, Baylor
- (United States) Chris Cenac Jr. – F/C, Houston
- (United States) / (Dominican Republic) Yaxel Lendeborg – F, Michigan
- (United States) Morez Johnson Jr. – F, Michigan
- (Germany) Hannes Steinbach – F, Washington
- (United States) Bennett Stirtz – G, Iowa

A third group of invitees was announced on June 17.

- (United States) Isaiah Evans – F, Duke (sophomore)
- (United States) Allen Graves – F, Santa Clara (freshman)
- (United States) Dailyn Swain – G/F, Texas (junior)
- (United States) Ebuka Okorie – G, Stanford (freshman)

A fourth and final group of invitees was announced on June 24. This time consisting of prospects for the second round, bringing the final total overall number to 34.

- (Iran) Mohammad Amini – G/F, Nancy Basket
- (United States) Donovan Atwell – G, Texas Tech
- (United States) / (Dominican Republic) Rafael Castro – C, George Washington
- (United States) Tre Donaldson – G, Miami (FL)
- (Germany) Jack Kayil – G, Alba Berlin
- (United Kingdom) Tobi Lawal – F, Virginia Tech
- (Spain) Baba Miller – F, Cincinnati
- (Nigeria) Ugonna Onyenso – C, Virginia
- (United States) Meleek Thomas – G, Arkansas
- (United States) Bruce Thornton – G, Ohio State
