= Chris Cenac Jr. =

American basketball player (born 2007)

No. 12 – Boston Celtics
- Position: Power forward
- League: NBA

Personal information
- Born: February 1, 2007 (age 19) New Orleans, Louisiana, U.S.
- Listed height: 6 ft 11 in (2.11 m)
- Listed weight: 240 lb (109 kg)

Career information
- High school: Riverside Academy (Reserve, Louisiana); Isidore Newman School (New Orleans, Louisiana); Link Academy (Branson, Missouri)
- College: Houston (2025–2026)
- NBA draft: 2026: 1st round, 27th overall pick
- Drafted by: Boston Celtics
- Playing career: 2026–present

Career history
- 2026–present: Boston Celtics
- 2026: →Maine Celtics

Career highlights
- McDonald's All-American (2025); Jordan Brand Classic (2025); Nike Hoop Summit (2025)
- Stats at NBA.com
- Stats at Basketball Reference
Medals
Men's basketball
Representing United States
FIBA U17 World Cup
Gold medal – first place	2024 Turkey	Team

Christopher Robert Cenac Jr. (born February 1, 2007) is an American professional basketball player for the Boston Celtics of the National Basketball Association (NBA). A power forward, he played college basketball for the Houston Cougars and was selected by Boston with the 27th overall pick in the 2026 NBA draft.

== Early life and high school career ==
Cenac grew up in New Orleans. He attended Riverside Academy as a freshman before transferring to Isidore Newman School, where he sat out his sophomore season under transfer rules. As a junior, he helped Newman win its third consecutive state championship and averaged 13.9 points, 10.2 rebounds, 1.7 assists, 1.9 steals, and 1.3 blocks per game. After his junior year, he transferred to Link Academy in Branson, Missouri.

During the summer of 2024, Cenac was named the most valuable player of the NBPA Top 100 Camp. In March 2025, he helped Link Academy win the inaugural Nike EYBL Scholastic conference tournament and was named tournament MVP.

Cenac was a consensus five-star recruit and was ranked among the top ten players in the 2025 class by major recruiting services. On November 26, 2024, he committed to Houston, choosing the Cougars over a final group that also included LSU, Auburn, Arkansas, Baylor, Kentucky, and Tennessee. He was selected for the 2025 McDonald's All-American Game, Jordan Brand Classic, and Nike Hoop Summit.

== College career ==
Cenac played one season for Houston in 2025–26. He started 36 of 37 games and averaged 9.5 points, a team-leading 7.9 rebounds, 0.7 assists, 0.8 steals, and 0.5 blocks per game. He was named to the NABC All-Gulf District second team as Houston finished 30–7 and reached the Sweet Sixteen of the 2026 NCAA Division I men's basketball tournament.

On April 9, 2026, Cenac declared for the 2026 NBA draft. The following day, he said that he had hired an agent and was fully committed to remaining in the draft.

== Professional career ==
On June 23, 2026, Cenac was selected by the Boston Celtics with the 27th overall pick in the first round of the 2026 NBA draft. He signed his rookie contract with Boston on July 6. Cenac was also named to the Celtics' roster for the 2026 NBA Summer League.

On October 26, 2026, Cenac made his official NBA debut against the Chicago Bulls, recording 3 points and one rebound in five minutes in 125–111 win. On November 5, Cenac was assigned to Boston's NBA G League affiliate, the Maine Celtics.

== National team career ==
Cenac represented the United States under-17 team at the 2024 FIBA Under-17 Basketball World Cup. He averaged 8.9 points, 5.4 rebounds, and 1.1 assists in seven games as the United States won the gold medal.

== Career statistics ==
Legend
GP	Games played	GS	Games started	MPG	Minutes per game
FG%	Field goal percentage	3P%	3-point field goal percentage	FT%	Free throw percentage
RPG	Rebounds per game	APG	Assists per game	SPG	Steals per game
BPG	Blocks per game	PPG	Points per game	**Bold**	Career high

=== College ===
Year	Team	GP	GS	MPG	FG%	3P%	FT%	RPG	APG	SPG	BPG	PPG
2025–26	Houston	37	36	24.8	.485	.333	.621	7.9	.7	.8	.5	9.5
