= Los Angeles Lakers draft history =

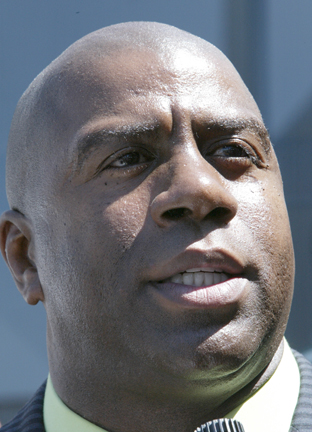
Magic Johnson was drafted first overall by the Lakers in 1979.

The Los Angeles Lakers began their history in the National Basketball League (NBL) during the 1946–47 season as the Detroit Gems but moved to Minnesota and became the Minneapolis Lakers the following season. Prior to the 1948–49 BAA season the franchise moved to the Basketball Association of America (BAA) which later merged with the NBL to form the National Basketball Association). The Lakers moved to Los Angeles for the 1959–60 NBA season, where they have been located ever since. The Minneapolis Lakers took its official name from Minnesota's nickname, Land of 10,000 Lakes.

To help the Lakers acquire local players, territorial picks were instituted from 1949 until 1965. Territorial picks were used as a type of special draft choice used in the NBA draft. Prior to the league's draft, a team could forfeit its first-round draft pick and select a player from within 50 miles (80 km). Territorial picks were then eliminated when the draft was revamped in 1966. Before the 1989 NBA draft, the draft had more than two rounds. After 1989, the NBA agreed with the National Basketball Players' Association to limit drafts to two rounds. Teams can also trade their picks, so some years a team could have more than or less than two picks.

The Lakers selected Chuck Hanger with their first pick, ninth overall in the 1948 BAA draft. The Lakers got their first overall draft pick in 1958 by choosing Elgin Baylor, who went on to be selected as the only NBA Rookie of the Year to be on the Lakers. The Lakers also drafted Magic Johnson in 1979 with their second first overall pick, who was rated the greatest NBA point guard of all time by ESPN in 2007. The Lakers had no first-round draft picks in 1967, 1976, 1978, 1980, 2008, 2010, 2011, 2012 and 2013. The Lakers had no first or second-round draft picks from 1983, 1987, and 2001. Throughout the years, the Lakers had traded away some of their picks as well as traded for other teams' picks. As a result of the various trades, the Los Angeles Lakers had five first and second-round picks in 1979. In 1996, GM Jerry West orchestrated a draft day trade in which a High School Kobe Bryant was acquired by the Los Angeles Lakers for Vlade Divac. This same year, Jerry West had acquired a FA Shaquille O’Neal in a blockbuster signing.

== Key ==
Abbreviation	Meaning	Abbreviation	Meaning
T	Territorial pick	G	Guard
PG	Point guard	SG	Shooting guard
F	Forward	SF	Small forward
PF	Power forward	C	Center
*	Hall of Famer	(#)	Retired Lakers' Number
§	NBA All-star		First overall NBA draft pick

== BAA/NBA selections ==
Year	Round	Pick	Player	Nationality	Position	From
1948	1	9	Chuck Hanger	United States	F	California
1949	T	—	Vern Mikkelsen*	United States	F/C	Hamline
1950	1	10	Kevin O'Shea	United States	G	Notre Dame
1951	T	—	Whitey Skoog	United States	G	Minnesota
1951	2	19	Lew Hitch	United States	F/C	Kansas State
1952	1	9	Clyde Lovellette*	United States	C/F	Kansas
1953	1	7	Jim Fritsche	United States	F/C	Hamline
1954	1	9	Ed Kalafat	United States	C/F	Minnesota
1954	2	18	Al Bianchi	United States	G	Bowling Green State
1955	T	—	Dick Garmaker	United States	G/F	Minnesota
1955	2	12	Chuck Mencel	United States	F/G	Minnesota
1956	1	3	Jim Paxson Sr.	United States	F/G	Dayton
1957	1	3	Jim Krebs	United States	C/F	Southern Methodist
1957	2	11	Harv Schmidt	United States	F	Illinois
1958	1	1	Elgin Baylor*§ (22)	United States	F	Seattle
1959	1	3	Tom Hawkins	United States	F	Notre Dame
1959	2	8	Steve Hamilton	United States	F/C	Morehead State
1959	2	10	Rudy LaRusso§	United States	F/C	Dartmouth
1960	1	2	Jerry West* (44)	United States	G	West Virginia
1961	1	5	Wayne Yates	United States	C	Memphis State
1961	2	13	Fred Sawyer	United States	C	Louisville
1962	1	6	LeRoy Ellis	United States	C	St. John's
1962	2	15	Gene Wiley	United States	C	Wichita
1963	1	7	Roger Strickland	United States	F	Jacksonville
1963	2	13	Jim King (from Cincinnati)^{[a]}	United States	G	Tulsa
1963	2	16	Mel Gibson	United States	G	Western Carolina
1964	T	—	Mahdi Abdul-Rahman	United States	G	UCLA
1964	2	12	Cotton Nash	United States	F	Kentucky
1965	T	—	Gail Goodrich* §(25)	United States	G	UCLA
1965	2	16	John Fairchild	United States	F	Brigham Young
1966	1	7	Jerry Chambers	United States	F	Utah
1966	2	17	Hank Finkel	United States	C	Dayton
1967	2	16	Randolph Mahaffey	United States	F	Clemson
1968	1	11	Bill Hewitt	United States	F	USC
1969	1	12	Willie McCarter	United States	G	Drake
1969	1	15	Rick Roberson	United States	C/PF	Cincinnati
1969	2	27	Dick Garrett	United States	G	Southern Illinois
1970	1	13	Jim McMillian	United States	F	Columbia
1970	2	30	Earnie Killum	United States	G	Stetson
1971	1	13	Jim Cleamons	United States	G	Ohio State
1972	1	13	Travis Grant	United States	F	Kentucky State
1972	2	16	Jim Price (from Cleveland)^{[b]}	United States	G	Louisville
1972	2	22	Paul Stovall (from Baltimore)^{[c]}	United States	F	Arizona State
1973	1	5	Kermit Washington§ (from Cleveland)^{[d]}	United States	C/PF	American
1973	2	23	Billy Schaeffer	United States	F	St. John's
1973	2	31	Jim Chones (from Baltimore)^{[e]}	United States	C/PF	Marquette
1973	2	34	Pete Perry	United States	C	Pan American
1974	1	12	Brian Winters§	United States	SG/SF	South Carolina
1974	2	21	Billy Knight§	United States	G/F	Pittsburgh
1975	1	2	David Meyers	United States	PF/C	UCLA
1975	1	8	Junior Bridgeman	United States	SF/SG	Louisville
1976	2	21	Earl Tatum (from Phoenix)^{[f]}	United States	G/F	Marquette
1977	1	6	Kenny Carr	United States	F	North Carolina State
1977	1	15	Brad Davis (from San Antonio)^{[g]}	United States	G	Maryland
1977	1	22	Norm Nixon§	United States	PG	Duquesne
1978	2	26	Ron Carter	United States	G	VMI
1978	2	38	Lew Massey (from Kansas City)^{[h]}	United States	SG	UNC Charlotte
1979	1	1	Earvin Johnson* §(32)	United States	PG	Michigan State
1979	1	14	Brad Holland	United States	G	UCLA
1979	2	25	Oliver Mack	United States	SG	East Carolina
1979	2	39	Victor King (from Denver)^{[i]}	United States	PF	Louisiana Tech
1979	2	41	Mark Young (from Buffalo)^{[j]}	United States	PF	Fairfield
1980	2	31	Wayne Robinson (from Cleveland)^{[k]}	United States	F	Virginia Tech
1980	2	37	Butch Carter (from Denver)^{[i]}	United States	G	Indiana
1981	1	19	Mike McGee	United States	SG/SF	Michigan
1981	2	39	Harvey Knuckles (from Cleveland)^{[k]}	United States	SF	Toledo
1981	2	42	Elvis Rolle	United States	C/PF	Florida State
1982	1	1	James Worthy*§ (42) (from Cleveland)^{[l]}	United States	SF	North Carolina
1984	1	23	Earl Jones	United States	C	District of Columbia
1985	1	23	A.C. Green§	United States	PF/C	Oregon State
1986	1	23	Ken Barlow	United States	F	Notre Dame
1988	1	25	David Rivers	United States	PG	Notre Dame
1989	1	26	Vlade Divac§	Yugoslavia (now Serbia)	C	KK Partizan (Yugoslavia)
1990	1	27	Elden Campbell	United States	PF/C	Clemson
1990	2	51	Tony Smith (from San Antonio)^{[m]}	United States	G	Marquette
1991	2	52	Anthony Jones	United States	SG	Oral Roberts
1992	1	15	Anthony Peeler	United States	SG	Missouri
1992	2	36	Duane Cooper	United States	G	USC
1993	1	12	George Lynch	United States	PF	North Carolina
1993	2	37	Nick Van Exel§	United States	PG	Cincinnati
1994	1	10	Eddie Jones§	United States	SG	Temple
1995	2	37	Frankie King	United States	PG	Western Carolina
1996	1	24	Derek Fisher	United States	PG	Arkansas–Little Rock
1997	2	51	DeJuan Wheat	United States	PG	Louisville
1997	2	54	Paul Rogers (from New York)^{[n]}	Australia	C	Gonzaga
1998	1	26	Sam Jacobson	United States	SG/SF	Minnesota
1998	2	31	Ruben Patterson (from Vancouver)^{[o]}	United States	SF	Cincinnati
1998	2	45	Toby Bailey (traded to Phoenix)^{[p]}	United States	SG	UCLA
1999	1	23	Devean George	United States	SF	Augsburg
1999	2	30	John Celestand (from Vancouver)^{[o]}	United States	SG	Villanova
2000	1	29	Mark Madsen	United States	PF/C	Stanford
2002	1	27	Chris Jefferies (traded to Toronto)^{[q]}	United States	SF	Fresno State
2003	1	24	Brian Cook	United States	PF	Illinois
2003	2	32	Luke Walton	United States	SF	Arizona
2004	1	27	Sasha Vujačić	Slovenia	G	Pallalcesto Amatori Udine (Italy)
2004	2	56	Marcus Douthit	United States	PF/C	Providence
2005	1	10	Andrew Bynum§	United States	C	St. Joseph HS (New Jersey)
2005	2	37	Ronny Turiaf (from New York via Atlanta and Charlotte)^{[r]}	France	PF/C	Gonzaga
2005	2	39	Von Wafer	United States	G	Florida State
2006	1	26	Jordan Farmar (from Miami)^{[s]}	United States	PG	UCLA
2006	2	51	Cheikh Samb (traded to Detroit)^{[t]}	Senegal	C	WTC Cornellà (Spain)
2007	1	19	Javaris Crittenton	United States	PG	Georgia Tech
2007	2	40	Sun Yue (from Charlotte)^{[u]}	China	PG	Beijing Olympians (ABA)
2007	2	48	Marc Gasol§	Spain	C	Akasvayu Girona (LEB)
2008	2	58	Joe Crawford	United States	SG	Kentucky
2009	1	29	Toney Douglas (traded to New York)^{[v]}	United States	G	Florida State
2009	2	42	Patrick Beverley (from Charlotte; traded to Miami)^{[r]}^{[w]}	United States	G	Arkansas
2009	2	59	Chinemelu Elonu	United States	PF/C	Texas A&M
2010	2	43	Devin Ebanks (from Memphis)^{[x]}	United States	F	West Virginia
2010	2	58	Derrick Caracter	United States	PF/C	UTEP
2011	2	41	Darius Morris (from Golden State Warriors via New Jersey Nets)^{[y]}	United States	PG	Michigan
2011	2	46	Andrew Goudelock (from New York Knicks)^{[v]}	United States	SG	College of Charleston
2011	2	56	Chukwudiebere Maduabum (traded to Denver Nuggets)^{[z]}	Nigeria	SF	Bakersfield Jam (D-League)
2011	2	58	Ater Majok (from Miami Heat)^{[w]}	Australia	C	Gold Coast Blaze (Australia)
2012	2	60	Robert Sacre (from Chicago via Milwaukee and Brooklyn)	Canada	C	Gonzaga
2013	2	48	Ryan Kelly	United States	PF	Duke
2014	1	7	Julius Randle§	United States	PF	Kentucky
2015	1	2	D'Angelo Russell§	United States	PG	Ohio State
2015	1	27	Larry Nance Jr.	United States	PF	Wyoming
2015	2	34	Anthony Brown	United States	SF	Stanford
2016	1	2	Brandon Ingram§	United States	SF	Duke
2016	2	32	Ivica Zubac	Croatia	C	Mega Leks (Serbia)
2017	1	2	Lonzo Ball	United States	PG	UCLA
2017	1	28	Tony Bradley (traded to Utah)	United States	C	Utah
2018	1	25	Moritz Wagner (from Cleveland via Portland and Cleveland)	Germany	PF	Michigan
2018	2	39	Isaac Bonga (from New York via Philadelphia)	Germany	PG	Skyliners Frankfurt (Germany)
2018	2	47	Sviatoslav Mykhailiuk (from Denver via Utah and Chicago)	Ukraine	SG	Kansas
2019	1	4	De'Andre Hunter (traded to Atlanta)	United States	SF	Virginia
2019	2	46	Talen Horton-Tucker (from Orlando via Brooklyn, Charlotte and Memphis)	United States	SF	Iowa State
2020	1	28	Jaden McDaniels (traded to Minnesota via Oklahoma City)	United States	SF	Washington
2021	1	22	Isaiah Jackson (traded to Indiana)	United States	C/PF	Kentucky
2022	2	35	Max Christie (from Indiana via Milwaukee to Orlando)	United States	SG	Michigan State
2023	1	17	Jalen Hood-Schifino	United States	PG/SG	Indiana
2024	1	17	Dalton Knecht	United States	SF	Tennessee
2024	2	55	Bronny James	United States	SG	USC
2025	2	55	Lachlan Olbrich (traded to Chicago)	Australia	PF	Illawarra Hawks (Australia)
2026	1	25	Sergio de Larrea (traded to Dallas)	Spain	PG/SG	Valencia (Spain)

== Footnotes ==
- ^{a} The Lakers traded Tom Hawkins to Cincinnati for a future draft pick (Jim King).
- ^{b} The Lakers traded Rick Roberson to Cleveland for a future draft pick (Jim Price) and cash.
- ^{c} The Lakers traded John Tresvant to Baltimore for a future draft pick (Paul Stovall).
- ^{d} The Lakers traded Jim Cleamons to Cleveland for a future draft pick (Kermit Washington).
- ^{e} The Lakers traded Flynn Robinson to Baltimore for future considerations.
- ^{f} The Lakers traded Pat Riley to Phoenix in exchange for two future draft picks (Earl Tatum and ?).
- ^{g} The Lakers traded Melvin Calvin to San Antonio for 1977 first-round draft pick (Brad Davis) and cash.
- ^{h} The Lakers traded Lucius Allen to Kansas City for Ollie Johnson and a first and second round (Lew Massey) draft picks in 1978.
- ^{i} The Lakers traded Charlie Scott to Denver for Ron Boone and two second-round draft picks (Victor King and Butch Carter).
- ^{j} The Lakers traded Tom Abernethy to Buffalo for a second-round draft pick (Mark Young).
- ^{k} The Lakers traded Kenny Carr for two second-round draft picks (Wayne Robinson and Harvey Knuckles).
- ^{l} The Lakers traded Don Ford and a first-round draft pick (Chad Kinch) to Cleveland in exchange for Butch Lee and a first-round draft pick in the 1982 draft (James Worthy).
- ^{m} The Lakers traded Mike Smrek to San Antonio for a 1990 second-round draft pick (Tony Smith).
- ^{n} The Lakers traded Doug Christie to New York in exchange for two second-round draft picks (Paul Rogers and ?).
- ^{o} The Lakers traded George Lynch and Anthony Peeler to Vancouver in exchange for future considerations.
- ^{p} The Lakers traded draft rights to Toby Bailey to the Phoenix Suns in exchange for future considerations.
- ^{q} The Lakers traded Lindsey Hunter and draft rights to Chris Jefferies in exchange for Tracy Murray and draft rights to Kareem Rush.

- ^{r} The Lakers have traded guard Kareem Rush to the Charlotte Bobcats for two future second-round draft picks (Ronny Turiaf and Patrick Beverley). The Bobcats have acquired a second-round pick (Ronny Turiaf) in the 2005 NBA Draft from Atlanta in exchange for forward/center Predrag Drobnjak. Atlanta Hawks acquired centers Michael Doleac (from the New York Knicks) and Joel Przybilla (from the Milwaukee Bucks), along with a 2005 second-round pick from the Knicks (Ronny Turiaf), while sending center Nazr Mohammed to the Knicks in the three-way trade.
- ^{s} The Lakers have acquired forward Lamar Odom, forward Caron Butler, forward Brian Grant and a future first-round draft pick (Jordan Farmar) from the Miami Heat in exchange for center Shaquille O'Neal.
- ^{t} The Lakers traded draft rights to center Cheikh Samb in exchange for Maurice Evans.
- ^{u} The Lakers have traded forward Jumaine Jones to the Charlotte Bobcats for a 2007 second-round draft pick (Sun Yue).
- ^{v} The Lakers traded draft rights to Toney Douglas to the New York Knicks in exchange for a 2011 second-round draft choice (Andrew Goudelock) and cash considerations.
- ^{w} The Lakers traded draft rights to Patrick Beverley to the Miami Heat in exchange for a 2011 second-round draft pick (Ater Majok) and cash considerations.
- ^{x} The Lakers traded forward Kwame Brown, guard Javaris Crittenton, guard Aaron McKie, the draft rights to Marc Gasol, and first-round picks in 2008 (Donté Greene) and 2010 (Greivis Vásquez) to Memphis in exchange for Pau Gasol and a second round draft choice in 2010 (Devin Ebanks).
- ^{y} The Lakers traded guard Sasha Vujacic and a 2011 first-round draft pick (JaJuan Johnson) to New Jersey in exchange for forward Joe Smith and two second-round draft picks (Darius Morris & Chicago's second-round pick in 2012) along with the draft rights to Sergei Lishchuk from Houston.
- ^{z} The Lakers traded draft rights to Chukwudiebere Maduabum to the Denver Nuggets in exchange for a future second-round draft pick.

== See also ==
- NBA records
