= Vsevolod Ishchenko =

Russian basketball player (born 2005)

Vsevolod Ishchenko Всеволод Ищенко
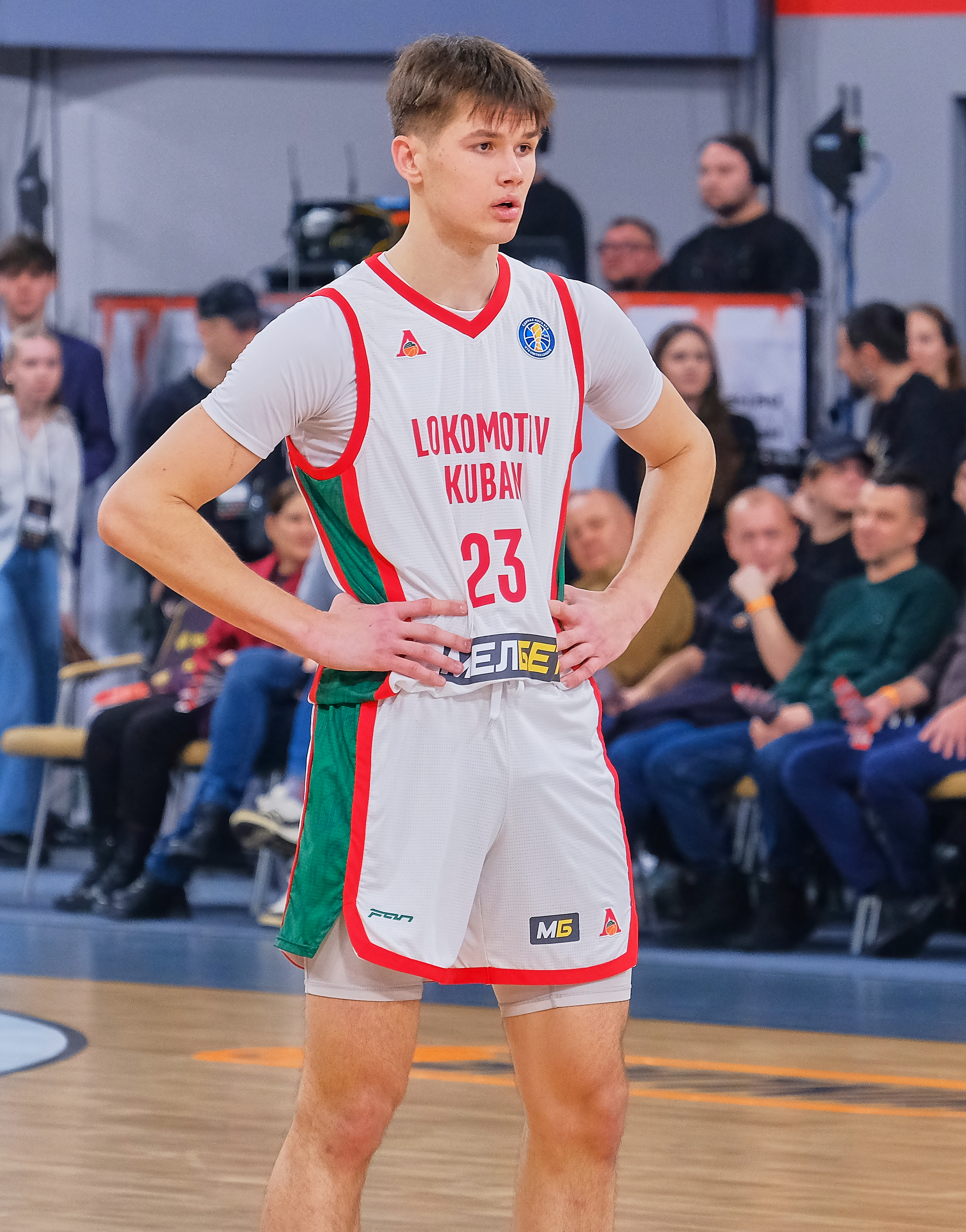
- Ishchenko with Lokomotiv Kuban in 2026

No. 23 – Lokomotiv Kuban
- Position: Shooting guard
- League: VTB United League

Personal information
- Born: 10 February 2005 (age 21) Rostov-on-Don, Russia
- Listed height: 6 ft 8 in (2.03 m)
- Listed weight: 218 lb (99 kg)

Career information
- NBA draft: 2026: 2nd round, 56th overall pick
- Drafted by: Chicago Bulls
- Playing career: 2024–present

Career history
- 2024–present: Lokomotiv Kuban

Career highlights
- VTB United League Young Player of the Year (2026); VTB United League All-Star Game (2026)
- Stats at NBA.com
- Stats at Basketball Reference

Vsevolod Ishchenko (Russian: Всеволод Ищенко; born February 10, 2005) is a Russian professional basketball player for Lokomotiv Kuban of the VTB United League. He declared for the 2026 NBA draft in April 2026 and was selected 56th overall by the Chicago Bulls, who then immediately traded his draft rights to the Dallas Mavericks.

== Early life and youth career ==
Ishchenko was born on February 10, 2005 in Rostov-on-Don, Russia. He developed through multiple youth basketball programs in Rostov-on-Don before joining the Lokomotiv Kuban development system. He was MVP of the VTB United Youth League Supercup (2023), first-team All-VTB United Youth League in 2023–24 and averaged 16.1 points, 7.0 rebounds and 4.3 assists for Lokomotiv Kuban-2.

== Professional career ==
=== Lokomotiv Kuban (2024–present) ===
Ishchenko joined the senior roster of Lokomotiv Kuban in September 2024, competing in the VTB United League. During the 2025–26 season, Ishchenko averaged 8.7 points, 4.5 rebounds, 2.1 assists, and 1.3 steals per game. He also played with Lokomotiv Kuban in the Winline Basket Cup, but they were eliminated after the group stage. He was named a VTB United League All-Star, and was named as the VTB United League Young Player of the Year (2025–26) and recorded multiple standout performances, including his first career double-double and a game with 15 points and a season high 6 steals. On February 8, 2026, Ishchenko scored a career high 20 points, paired with 4 assists. 3 rebounds, steals, and a block against BC UNICS. Following his conclusion to the 2026 NBA Summer League, it was announced on August 3, 2026 that Ishchenko would be returning to Lokomotiv Kuban for the 2026–27 basketball season.

=== NBA draft rights ===
In April 2026, Ishchenko declared for the 2026 NBA draft.

On June 25, 2026, Ishchenko was selected with the 56th overall pick by the Chicago Bulls in the 2026 NBA draft. His draft rights were subsequently traded to the Dallas Mavericks via the Los Angeles Lakers on draft night. On July 3, 2026, it was announced that Ishchenko will be participating with the Mavericks during the 2026 NBA Summer League. Ishchenko appeared in all five Summer League games for the Mavericks, and finished with 9.6 points, 4.4 rebounds, and 3 assists in an average of 27.5 minutes.

== National team career ==
Ishchenko made his debut for the Russia national basketball team in 2025, appearing in two friendly international games.

== Player profile ==
Ishchenko is measured at 6 feet 8 inches (2.03 m) and 218 pounds, with a seven foot wingspan. Ishchenko is known for his shot-blocking defense, using his size to get blocks against other players. Outside of his defense, he's known for high motor and physicality which he uses to take contact and grab offensive and defensive rebounds. Despite possessing defensive prowess, Ishchenko is not known to be a dominant scorer, however, he excels at the three-point shot.

== Personal life ==
Ishchenko's father, Igor Ishchenko, was an amateur boxer in Tambov, Russia who finished with a record of 1-1-1.
