= PBC Lokomotiv Kuban =

Russian professional basketball team

Lokomotiv Kuban
- Nickname: Loko
- Leagues: VTB United League
- Founded: 1946; 80 years ago
- History: Lokomotiv Mineralnye Vody (1946–2003); Lokomotiv Rostov (2003–2009); Lokomotiv Kuban Krasnodar (2009–present)
- Arena: Basket-Hall Krasnodar
- Capacity: 7,500
- Location: Krasnodar, Russia
- Team colors: Red, green, white
- President: Andrey Vedischev
- Head coach: Tomislav Tomović
- Team captain: Patrick Miller
- Championships: 1 EuroCup; 2 Russian Cups
- Website: lokobasket.com
Home	Away	Third

PBC Lokomotiv Kuban (Russian: ПБК «Локомотив Кубань») is a Russian professional basketball team based in Krasnodar. It participates in the VTB United League.

Their honour list includes a EuroCup championship in the 2012–13 season, and two Russian Cup victories in 1999–00 and 2017–18.

== History ==
The history of the Lokomotiv starts back in 1946 in Mineralnye Vody. Lokomotiv played in the first league championship for a number of years, until in 1994 it finally got into the elite of the national basketball. In 1999, Lokomotiv got the right to represent Russia in the European tournaments, such as the FIBA Korać Cup and won the Cup of the International Railways Sports Union. Lokomotiv won 3rd place in the Russian League in 2001, and playing in the Korać Cup finals in 2002.

The season 2002–03 became the final for the team from Mineralnye Vody. Lokomotiv hardly reached the play-off, taking the 8th place out of 10, where it lost to the champion CSKA Moscow in all three matches. The decision was hence made to move the club to a more developed and economically growing area – Rostov region. The basketball club Lokomotiv Rostov was established in 2003 in Rostov-on-Don.

During the next six years, the club played in the city of Don. The best achievement of the Lokomotiv during these years was the 5th place in the Russian National Championship (2006–07 season) and the finals of the FIBA Europe Cup (2004–05 season). In the summer of 2009, the president of the Russian Railways, Vladimir Yakunin, made the decision to move the club from Rostov-on-Don to Krasnodar. The main reason for that was that the arenas in Rostov were not satisfying the requirements of the Russian National Championship and the club's European tournaments.

=== First year in Krasnodar (2009–2010) ===
After relocating to Krasnodar, Lokomotiv changed its name to Lokomotiv Kuban. Sašo Filipovski was named the head coach. Lokomotiv settled on the second place in standings for the first half of the season. However, the second half of the season was not successful as losses became more frequent, and by the end of 2009, Lokomotiv plummeted in the standings. Lokomotiv Kuban also played in the EuroChallenge, but lost all six games in the regular season, and soon, Filipovski was replaced by the Lithuanian national basketball team head coach – Kęstutis Kemzūra. Gerald Green, who joined the team in December, and center Grigory Shukhovtsov got an invitation to the Russian national basketball team at the end of the season. In the Russian League, despite elimination in the quarterfinals at the hands of Dynamo Moscow, Lokomotiv Kuban finished in 5th place.

=== 2010–11 season ===
Under the direction of coach Kęstutis Kemzūra, Lokomotiv in the PBL League finished 4th, after a loss in the semifinals to champions CSKA Moscow and a loss in the bronze medal series to EuroCup champions UNICS Kazan. Led by Jeremiah Massey, Mike Wilkinson and Lionel Chalmers, Lokomotiv in the FIBA EuroChallenge went all the way to the finals - despite being favorites to win, Lokomotiv lost to KK Krka 77:83 in the finals. The success in the tournament lead to Lokomotiv, along with champion Krka, qualifying to the EuroCup, the second tier competition in Europe.

=== 2011–12 season ===
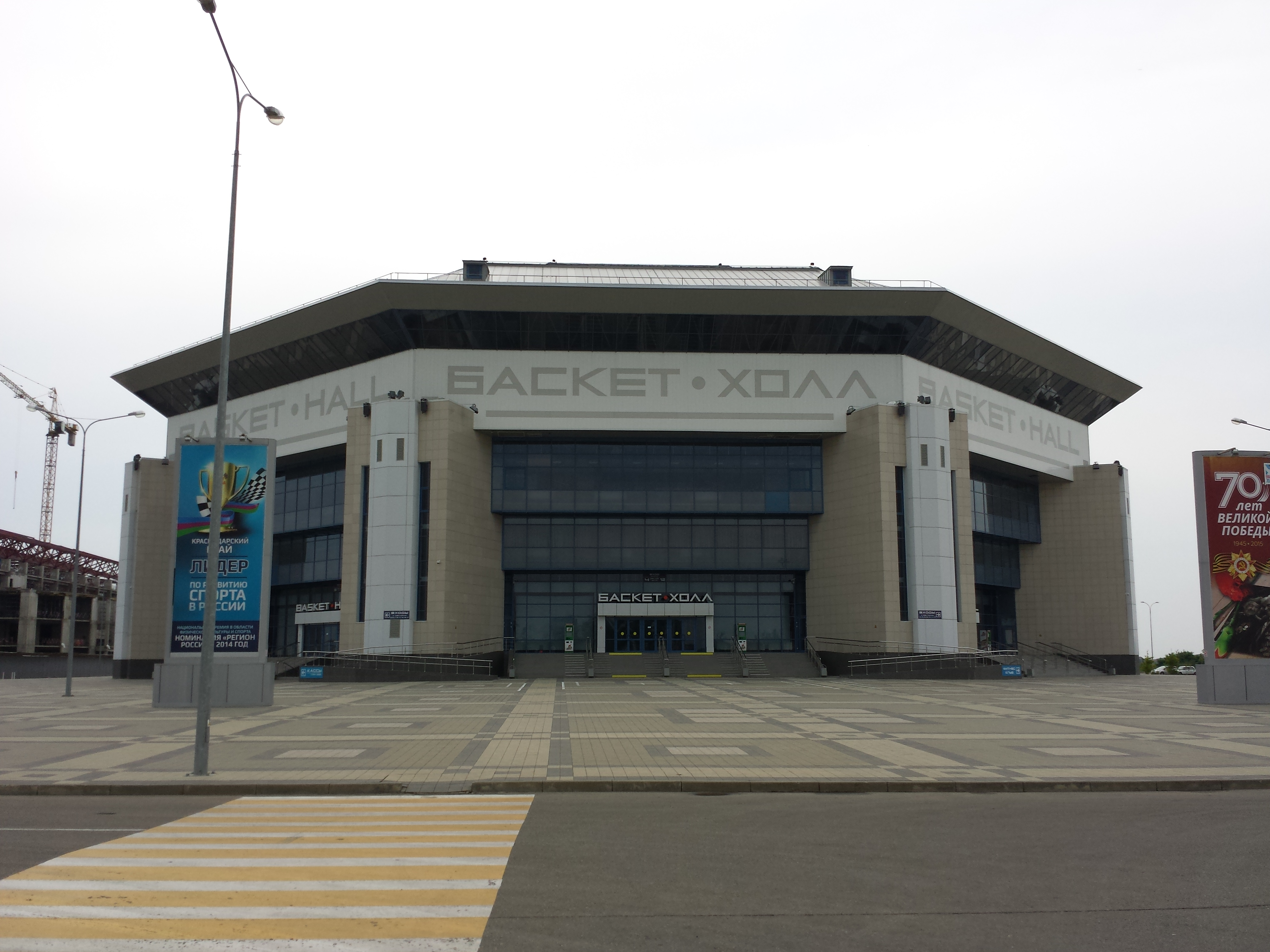
Lokomotiv-Kuban have played at the 7,500 capacity Basket-Hall Krasnodar since 2011

In the 2011–12 season, Lokomotiv Kuban signed coach Božidar Maljković - the team made their debut in the EuroCup tournament - led by Massey and Ali Traore, Lokomotiv had success in the regular season and the Top16, where they finished 1st in their group, reaching the quarterfinals, where they were eliminated by future champion Khimki. Lokomotiv won the bronze medals in the Russian League over BC Triumph Lyubertsy.

The club from Krasnodar also made its debut in the VTB United League. A loss in the semifinals to UNICS Kazan 86:87 prevented the team from reaching the finals. In the 3rd place game, Lokomotiv lost to BC Lietuvos rytas 83:91.

=== 2012–13 season ===
Evgeny Pashutin took the position of the Loko's head coach for season. Building an almost entirely new team, Lokomotiv signed players like Nick Calathes, Mantas Kalnietis, Aleks Marić, Derrick Brown, Alexey Savrasenko, Simas Jasaitis, Valery Likhodey. During the season, the team also signed Richard Hendrix to strengthen the roster. Lokomotiv struggled in the regular season, but wins over Galatasaray and BC Donetsk helped Lokomotiv finish in first place in their group. Reaching the Top16, Lokomotiv dominated - the addition of Hendrix and play by Brown lead to Lokomtiv easily finishing 1st in the group, and getting home court advantage for the EuroCup playoffs. In the playoffs, Lokomotiv beat KK Budućnost in the quarterfinals, and Valencia Basket in the semifinals. In the finals, held in Charleroi, Lokomotiv faced Bilbao Basket, last year's EuroLeague playoff participant. Lokomotiv won the game 75:64. Calathes was named EuroCup MVP, while Hendrix won the Finals MVP award.

In the VTB United League, now the top domestic competition, Lokomotiv struggled in the regular season, before the playoffs - reaching the finals, facing CSKA Moscow in the final series. Lokomotiv lost 1:3.

=== 2013–14 season ===
Team leader Nick Calathes left the team for the NBA, and Lokomotiv signed Krunoslav Simon to replace him. Debuting in the EuroLeague, Lokomotiv finished with a 6–4 record and a trip to the Top16. Team leader Derrick Brown was the MVP of November in the EuroLeague.

In the Top16, Lokomotiv fought in a tough group, with CSKA Moscow, Maccabi Tel Aviv and Real Madrid. Fighting for a final spot in the EuroLeague playoffs, Lokomotiv lost to Galatasaray, thus being eliminated from contention and finished the Top16 with a 7–7 record. In the VTB League, Lokomotiv faced CSKA Moscow in a rematch of the finals, this time in the quarterfinals - Lokomotiv shocked CSKA with two away wins, 87:83 and 81:66, in Moscow. Needing just one win to eliminate CSKA, Lokomotiv, however, suffered a fiasco - CSKA won the next two games in Krasnodar 76:73 and 79:78, before finishing the series by crushing Lokomotiv 84:65 in the deciding game in Moscow, winning the series 3:2 and eliminating Lokomotiv from the VTB League. Coach Pashutin left after the season.

=== 2014–15 season ===
Sergei Bazarevich was named the new head coach in the off-season, and together with the club's management he started forming the new roster. Marcus Williams, Aleks Marić, Valery Likhodey, Simas Jasaitis and Mantas Kalnietis left the team. Lokomotiv then signed Anthony Randolph, Malcolm Delaney, Aaron Miles, Nikita Kurbanov, Evgeny Voronov and Nikita Balashov. In the EuroCup, Lokomotiv entered the playoffs with a 16 consecutive wins, and defeated Brose Bamberg in the first round of the playoffs. In the quarterfinals, Lokomotiv faced UNICS Kazan, coached by Pashutin. After winning the first game 87:78, Lokomotiv had won a competition record 19 consecutive games. In the rematch, however, Lokomotiv suffered a total fiasco, losing 58:79 and shockingly being eliminated from the competition. Needing to qualify for the EuroLeague, Lokomotiv now had to reach the finals of the VTB League. Lokomotiv got their revenge on UNICS, sweeping them 3:0 in the quarterfinals, but suffered more heartbreak as they could not defeat Khimki in the semifinals, losing the series 2:3. The high hopes for the season ended with a total fiasco for the team.

=== Rise to the EuroLeague Final Four (2015–2016) ===
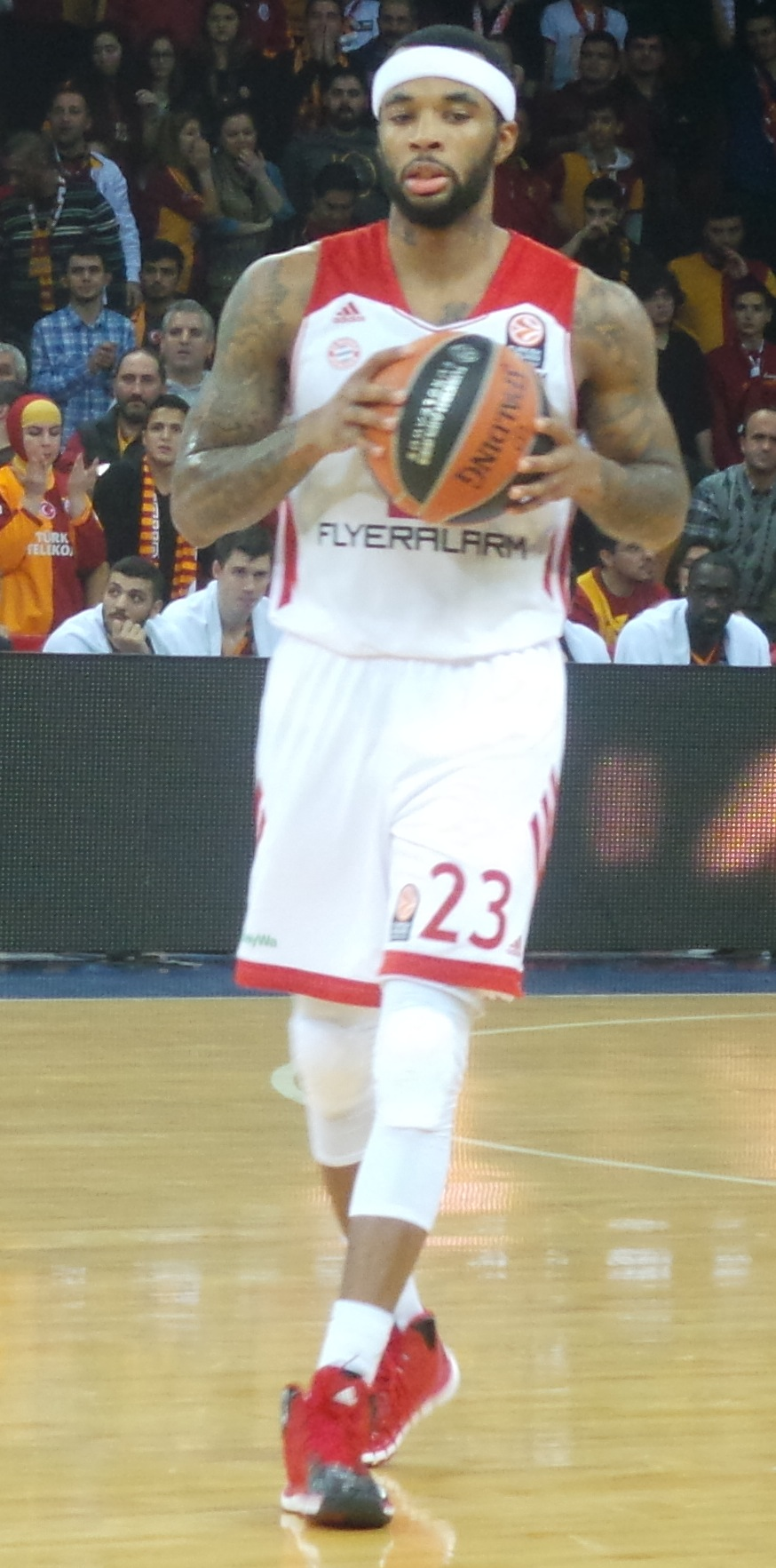
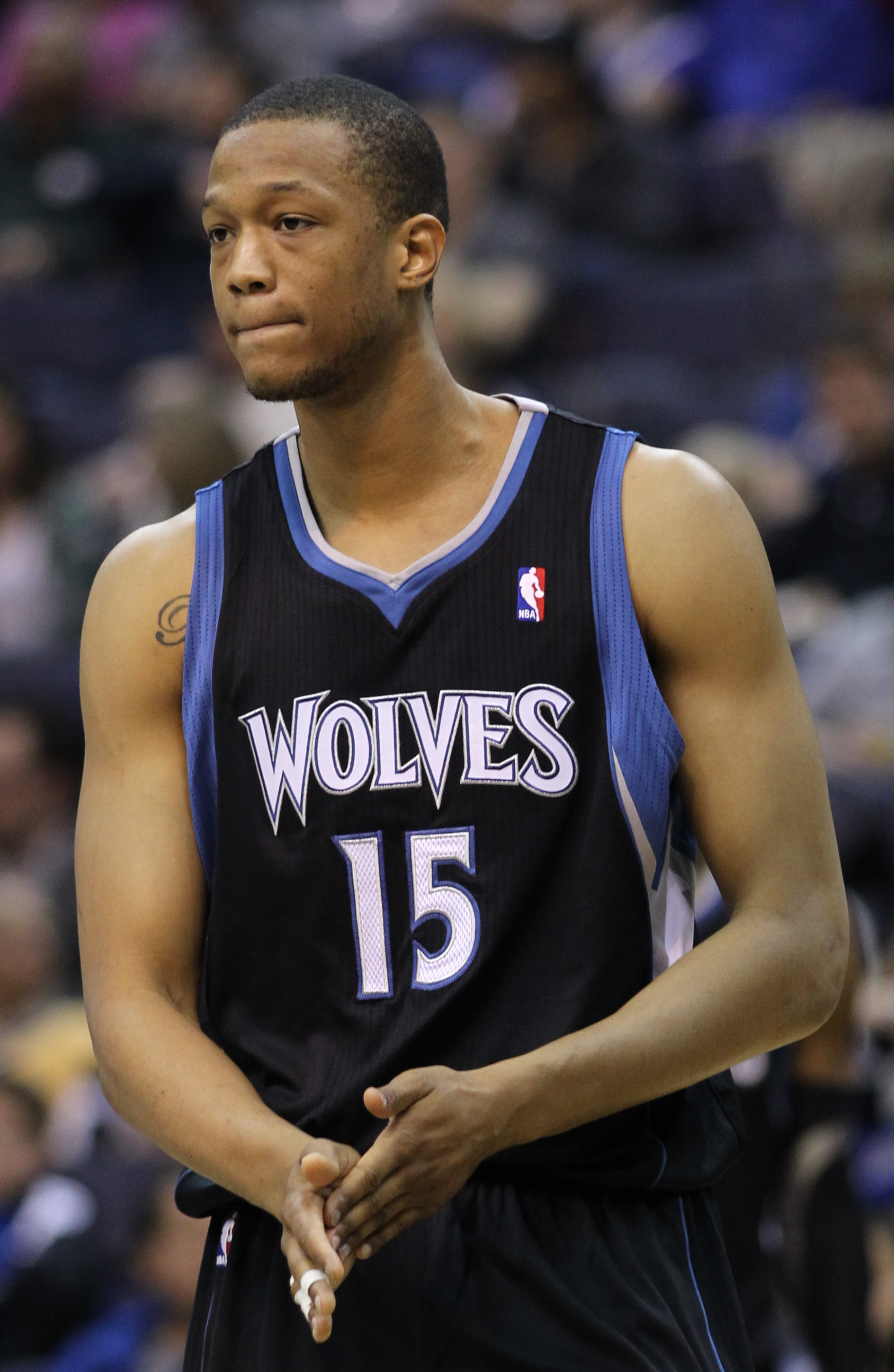
Malcolm Delaney and Anthony Randolph were named All-EuroLeague Team members following Kuban's historic season

Lokomotiv Kuban hired Georgios Bartzokas as their new head coach. Lokomotiv retained much of the roster, and also signed Chris Singleton, who quickly became one of the team leaders. They also received a wild card for the 2015–16 Euroleague. Lokomotiv finished in 1st place in the regular season, over teams like FC Barcelona and Panathinaikos. Finishing second in the Top16, Lokomotiv qualified to the playoffs. Lokomotiv achieved qualification to the 2016 Euroleague Final Four by beating FC Barcelona 3–2 in the playoffs. Malcolm Delaney and Anthony Randolph, who got places in the All-EuroLeague Teams. Their opponent during the Final Four semifinal would be fellow Russian team CSKA Moscow. Lokomotiv lost 81:88. However, Lokomotiv recovered and beat Laboral Kutxa 85:75 in the 3rd place game. However, in the VTB League, Lokomotiv finished only 5th in the regular season, and lost to Khimki 0:3 in the quarterfinals, losing a chance to compete in the 2016-2017 Euroleague.

=== 2016-2019 ===
On 14 November 2016, Lokomotiv signed new head coach Saša Obradović, who replaced the departed Bartzokas. Team leaders Delaney, Randolph and Singleton departed. Coach Obradović built a team based on teamwork, signing players like Taylor Rochestie, Matt Janning, Kevin Jones, Mardy Collins and Ian Vougioukas. Lokomotiv initially struggled in the EuroCup, barely entering the Top16 phase. However, the play improved and Lokomotiv finished in 1st place in the Top16, getting home court advantage for the playoffs. They easily defeated VTB rival BC Zenit Saint Petersburg 2:0 in the quarterfinals. Facing Unicaja Malaga, Lokomotiv were again favorites - however, Unicaja shocked everyone and won the first game in Krasnodar, 73:57, stealing home-court advantage from Lokomotiv. In the second game, this time in Malaga, Unicaja dominated from the start and won 74:63, winning the series 2:0 and eliminating Lokomotiv from the competition. In the 2016–17 VTB United League, Lokomotiv finished 4th in the regular season, getting home court advantage over UNICS Kazan, who took Lokomotiv's place in the 2016-2017 EuroLeague. Lokomotiv eliminated UNICS 3:1, and faced CSKA in the semifinals. Lokomotiv took the fight against the defending champions - losing the series 0:3.

Coach Obradović remained with the team for the 2017–2018 season. Ryan Broekhoff and Mardy Collins remained with the team, while Lokomotiv also signed Frank Elegar, Joe Ragland and Dmitry Kulagin. Lokomotiv won the Russian Basketball Cup with Kulagin being named the MVP. Lokomotiv quickly became one of the top teams of the EuroCup, finishing the regular season with 10–0 record. Lokomotiv continued to dominate in the Top16, ending with a 6–0 record and a combined 16–0 record heading into the playoffs. Entering the quarterfinals, Lokomotiv didn't stop - they beat Herbalife Gran Canaria 2:0 in the quarterfinals, and Grissin Bon Reggio Emilia 2:0 in the semifinals, breaking their own 2014-2015 streak by winning 20 consecutive games in the EuroCup. In the finals, Lokomotiv faced Darüşşafaka - Lokomotiv were the heavy favorites to win the tournament and enter the EuroLeague. However, Darüşşafaka shocked Lokomotiv by snapping their winning streak in the first match in Krasnodar, with Lokomotiv losing an overtime thriller 78:81. In the rematch, the shocked Lokomotiv lost 59:67, losing the EuroCup finals 0:2. In the VTB League, the format was changed to a final four, with the winners of the quarterfinals qualifying. Lokomotiv faced EuroLeague playoff participant Khimki in the quarterfinals. Lokomotiv, despite home court advantage, lost the first two games, before losing the deciding one in Moscow - losing the series 0:3 and ending the season with disappointment.

The 2018–2019 season was a very turbulent one - with three coaching changes. After a disappointing start, coach Obradović was replaced by assistant Vlada Jovanović. Lokomotiv, once again a favorite to win the EuroCup, finished the regular season with a 9–1 record. In the Top16 of the EuroCup, Lokomotiv finished second with a 4–2 record, losing first place to LDLC ASVEL, qualifying to the playoffs, but without homecourt advantage. In the quarterfinals, UNICS Kazan defeated Lokomotiv 2:1, ending the EuroCup campaign. The disappointing finish lead to Jovanović being fired, with Lokomotiv signing Bob Donewald Jr. as the new head coach for the team. Lokomotiv finished fourth in the VTB League regular season. Lokomotiv faced Zenit Saint Petersburg, and despite homecourt advantage, Zenit defeated Lokomotiv 3:1.

=== 2020–present ===
On February 28, 2022, EuroLeague Basketball suspended the team because of the 2022 Russian invasion of Ukraine. Americans Greg Whittington, Johnathan Motley, Stanton Kidd, and Darius Thompson all left the team after the Russian invasion.

== Arenas ==
Lokomotiv-Kuban played its home games at the 3,500-seat Olympus Arena, prior to moving to the newer and larger 7,500-seat Basket-Hall Krasnodar.

== Honours and achievement ==
=== Domestic ===
- Russian Cup
  - Winners (2): 1999–00, 2017–18
  - Runners-up (1): 2013–14

=== International ===
- EuroLeague
  - Third place (1): 2015–16
  - Final Four (1): 2016
- EuroCup
  - Winners (1): 2012–13
  - Runners-up (1): 2017–18
- FIBA Korać Cup
  - Runners-up (1): 2001–02
- FIBA EuroChallenge
  - Runners-up (1): 2010–11

=== Regional ===
- VTB United League
  - Runners-up (1): 2013
- FIBA Europe Conference North
  - Runners-up (1): 2004–05

=== Other competitions ===
- Bursa Cevat Soydas Tournament
  - Winners (1): 2019

== Season by season ==
Season	Tier	League	Pos.	Russian Cup	European competitions		
2009–10	1	Super League	5th		3 EuroChallenge	RS	0–6
2010–11	1	PBL	4th	Semifinalist	3 EuroChallenge	RU	11–5
2011–12	1	PBL	3rd		2 Eurocup	QF	9–5
2012–13	1	PBL	4th		2 EuroCup	C	13–4
2012–13	1	United League	2nd		2 EuroCup	C	13–4
2013–14	1	United League	5th	Runner-up	1 EuroLeague	T16	13–11
2014–15	1	United League	3rd		2 EuroCup	QF	19–1
2015–16	1	United League	5th		1 EuroLeague	3rd	21–10
2016–17	1	United League	4th		2 EuroCup	SF	10–8
2017–18	1	United League	5th	Champion	2 EuroCup	RU	22–2
2018–19	1	United League	5th	First round	2 EuroCup	QF	14–5
2019–20	1	United League	3rd		2 EuroCup	RS	4–6
2020–21	1	United League	4th		2 EuroCup	QF	12–7
2021–22	1	United League	4th		2 EuroCup	RS	
2022–23	1	United League	2nd				
2023–24	1	United League	4th				
2024–25	1	United League	4th				

== Players ==
=== Current roster ===
Note: Flags indicate national team eligibility at FIBA-sanctioned events. Players may hold other non-FIBA nationalities not displayed.

Lokomotiv Kuban roster
Players
Coaches

Pos.	No.	Nat.	Name	Ht.		Age
PG	2	(United States)	Miller, Patrick (C)	1.85 m (6 ft 1 in)	95 kg (209 lb)	34 – 22 May 1992
G	4	(Russia)	Vedishchev, Mikhail	1.92 m (6 ft 4 in)	80 kg (176 lb)	22 – 17 July 2004
G/F	7	(Russia)	Temirov, Kirill	1.97 m (6 ft 6 in)	96 kg (212 lb)	24 – 1 February 2002
G	8	(Russia)	Vorsulev, Roman	1.95 m (6 ft 5 in)	72 kg (159 lb)	17 – 3 September 2009
PG	9	(United States)	Knight, Marcos	1.90 m (6 ft 3 in)	93 kg (205 lb)	37 – 24 September 1989
F	11	(Russia)	Barashkov, Maksim	2.01 m (6 ft 7 in)	93 kg (205 lb)	28 – 10 July 1998
PF	14	(Russia)	Ryabkov, Pavel	2.08 m (6 ft 10 in)	90 kg (198 lb)	20 – 25 May 2006
C	15	(Russia)	Abdulbasirov, Ruslan	2.11 m (6 ft 11 in)	100 kg (220 lb)	32 – 5 December 1993
SF	16	(Russia)	Kvitkovskikh, Anton	2.00 m (6 ft 7 in)	104 kg (229 lb)	25 – 3 November 2000
F	17	(Serbia)	Pokuševski, Aleksej	2.13 m (7 ft 0 in)	95 kg (209 lb)	24 – 26 December 2001
SG	21	(United States)	Queen, Trevelin	1.98 m (6 ft 6 in)	86 kg (190 lb)	29 – 25 February 1997
G	23	(Russia)	Ishchenko, Vsevolod	1.90 m (6 ft 3 in)	99 kg (218 lb)	21 – 10 February 2005
F	27	(Russia)	Lopatin, Andrey	2.07 m (6 ft 9 in)	96 kg (212 lb)	28 – 27 August 1998
C	44	(Montenegro) (Qatar)	Hadzibegovic, Alen	2.08 m (6 ft 10 in)	103 kg (227 lb)	27 – 19 March 1999
C	61	(Russia)	Firsov, Gleb	2.08 m (6 ft 10 in)	62 kg (137 lb)	22 – 17 January 2004
G/F	99	(Russia)	Samoylenko, Ivan	1.95 m (6 ft 5 in)	70 kg (154 lb)	23 – 23 August 2003

Head coach

- (Serbia) Tomislav Tomović

Assistant coach(es)

- (Serbia) Janko Pejčić
- (Russia) Artem Komogortsev
- (Russia) Bogdan Bogdanov
- (Russia) Stanislav Zbarskiy

Legend

- (C) Team captain
- Injured

- Roster
Updated: August 9, 2026

=== Depth chart ===
Pos.	Starting 5	Bench 1	Bench 2	Bench 3
C	Aleksej Pokuševski	Gleb Firsov	Ruslan Abdulbasirov
PF	Andrey Lopatin	Anton Kvitkovskikh
SF	Ivan Samoilenko	Maxim Barashkov	Roman Vorsulev	Alen Hadzibegović
SG	Trevelin Queen	Kirill Temirov		Vsevolod Ishchenko
PG	Patrick Miller	Mikhail Vedishchev		Marcos Knight

== Management ==
- President – Andrey Vedischev
- Management board chairman – Anatoly Mescheryakov
- Vice-president for development – Boris Tikhonenko
- Executive director – Novikov Nikolay

== Coaching staff ==
- Head coach – Branko Maksimović
- Assisting coach – Jovan Beader
- Youth Loko-2 head coach – Zakhar Pashutin

== Notable players ==
Note: Flags indicate national team eligibility at FIBA-sanctioned events. Players may hold other non-FIBA nationalities not displayed.

Criteria

To appear in this section a player must have either:

- Set a club record or won an individual award while at the club
- Played at least one official international match for their national team at any time
- Played at least one official NBA match at any time.

- (Israel) Afik Nissim
- (Russia) Nikita Morgunov
- (Russia) Nikita Kurbanov
- (Slovenia) Aleksandar Ćapin
- (Lithuania) Mindaugas Kuzminskas
- (Lithuania) Mantas Kalnietis
- (Lithuania) Simas Jasaitis
- (Lithuania) Eurelijus Žukauskas
- (Lithuania) Giedrius Gustas
- (Lithuania) Artūras Masiulis
- (Poland) Szymon Szewczyk
- (Spain) Victor Claver
- (Bosnia and Herzegovina) / (Turkey) Asım Pars
- (South Korea) / (United States) Moon Tae-Jong
- (United States) Chris Babb
- (United States) Lorinza Harrington
- (United States) Anthony Goldwire
- (United States) Fred House
- (Guyana) Rawle Marshall
- (United States) Chris Lofton
- (United States) James Gist
- (United States) Josh Powell
- (United States) (Slovenia) Anthony Randolph
- (United States) Marcus Williams
- (Greece) (United States) Nick Calathes
- (United States) Gerald Green
- (United States) Malcolm Delaney
- (United States) Isaiah Whitehead
- (United States) Dorell Wright
- (United States) Alan Williams

== Head coaches ==
- (Russia) Evgeniy Pashutin
- (Serbia) Aleksandar Petrović
- (Serbia) Božidar Maljković
- (Serbia) Saša Obradović
- (Lithuania) Kęstutis Kemzūra
- (Croatia) Danijel Jusup
- (Slovenia) Sašo Filipovski
- (Russia) Sergei Bazarevich
- (Greece) Georgios Bartzokas
