= Dennis McNeil =

American opera singer

Dennis McNeil (born July 30, 1960, Los Angeles, California) is an American operatic tenor, musical theater performer, and concert singer. He was educated at Miraleste Intermediate School, Loyola High School (1978), the Institute for the American Musical, the Merola Opera Program of San Francisco Opera, and UC-Davis (1983).

== Opera ==
McNeil was a 1992 National Winner of the Metropolitan Opera National Council Auditions. He sang leading roles with the New York City Opera, including "Tamino" in The Magic Flute, "Don Jose" in Carmen (a role he has sung more than seventy times), and "Mark" in the New York City premiere of Michael Tippett’s The Midsummer Marriage for which he received the Richard F. Gold Career Award. He sang in Verdi's Requiem (with the Kalamazoo Singers). McNeil has performed with many of the major opera companies in the U.S. apart from New York City Opera, including the New York Metropolitan Opera, the San Francisco Opera, the New Orleans Opera, the San Diego Opera, the Western Opera Theater and the Los Angeles Opera.

== Musical theatre ==
On the musical theater stage he has sung the role of "Mr. Snow" in Carousel more than 140 times in four productions. He sang "Nikos" in Zorba with John Raitt in the title role, and he toured with lyricist Sammy Cahn in Words and Music, a musical review.

== Recitals and special events ==
McNeil sang at both the funeral and the Dodger Stadium Memorial for Los Angeles Times sportswriter Jim Murray. He has also sung at community and charity events, as well as in recital, including appearances abroad in London, Slovenia, and Linz, Austria.

Television appearances have included Hour of Power and on the KLTA Morning News (Los Angeles). He appears regularly with Three Tenors and the Hutchins Consort, a Los Angeles-based group which has performed at many venues including the Los Angeles County Museum of Art. He has also produced videos for MTV and VH-1.

== Family ==
McNeil is a fifth generation Californian and lives in Southern California.

== Awards ==
- Emily Baratelli Memorial Award from the New York Opera Index
- National Winner of the Metropolitan Opera National Council, 1993
- Rex Foundation Grant from the Grateful Dead
- Richard F. Gold Career Award, New York City Opera, 1994
- Southern California Opera Guild Singing Competition, 1st Place
- Sullivan Grant Recipient
- Victor Fuchs Memorial Competition, First Place

== Discography ==
McNeil has released recordings on his own label, DMI Productions (see McNeil's official website). He was heard on a recording of the oratorio The Rising, composed and orchestrated by Richard B. Evans, words by W. B. Yeats, Maud Gonne, Francis Ledwidge et al.
