= List of former municipalities in Los Angeles =

| Settlement | Annexed | Region |
| Town of Annandale | 1930 | East Side |
| Town of Bairdstown | 1915 | East Side |
| Town of Colegrove | 1910 | Greater Hollywood; Wilshire |
| City of Eagle Rock | 1923 | East Side |
| City of Garvanza | 1915 | East Side |
| City of Highland Park | 1895 | East Side |
| City of Hollywood | 1910 | Greater Hollywood |
| City of Hyde Park | 1923 | South Los Angeles |
| La Ballona Township (part) | 1920–1930 | West Side |
| Los Angeles Township (part) | 1915 | Northwest Los Angeles |
| Town of Palms | 1920 | West Side |
| San Antonio Township (part) | 1895–1910 | South Los Angeles |
| City of San Pedro | 1930 | Harbor Area |
| City of Sawtelle | 1920 | West Side |
| City of Venice | 1925 | West Side |
| City of Watts | 1926 | South Los Angeles |
| City of Wilmington | 1930 | Harbor Area |
| Wilmington Township | 1930 | Harbor Area |
