= Dan McCleary =

Dan McCleary (born 1952) is an American artist, and founder and artistic director of Art Division, a nonprofit organization offering professional arts training and academic and career support to young adults in the under-served MacArthur Park community in Los Angeles.

== Life and education ==
McCleary was born in Santa Monica, California. He graduated from Loyola High School of Los Angeles, and attended Santa Monica College, San Francisco Art Institute, and Skowhegan School of Painting and Sculpture in Maine in 1979.

== Work ==
The subject of McCleary's paintings, drawings and prints is individuals, often alone and rendered life-size, engaged in daily activities at home, the office, a hair salon or restaurant. Los Angeles Times art critic Christopher Knight has called McCleary "among the finest figurative painters working today." "McCleary is the David Hockney of ordinary moments," wrote Los Angeles Magazine.

While working as director of art programs for an after-school program, Heart of Los Angeles (HOLA), McCleary saw many low-income youth lose access to school and community-based arts programs when they graduated from high school. In response, in 2010 he founded Art Division, a nonprofit organization dedicated to providing youth aged 18–27 with free arts training and academic support from working artists, filmmakers, writers, educators, and other professionals. Located in the low-income, predominantly Hispanic community around historic MacArthur Park, Art Division is also committed to community engagement and building a thriving arts community within the community, presenting exhibitions, public lectures, film screenings, and special events throughout Los Angeles. In 2014, the 12,000-volume Art Division Library opened for students, artists, and the community at large.

== Exhibitions ==
McCleary has been featured in more than 50 solo and group exhibitions throughout the U.S. and Europe. His work resides in collections of public and private institutions such as The Hammer Museum, Harvard Art Museums, Los Angeles County Museum of Art, Metropolitan Museum of Art, and New York Public Library, among others.
