= Alexander-Martin Sardina =

German former MP

- Born: 15 September 1973 (age 53); Hamburg, Germany
- Citizenship: German, Italian
- Occupation: MP (2005–2008)

Academic background
- Education: University of Hamburg (PhD)

Academic work
- Discipline: Education
- Institutions: University of Hamburg

Alexander-Martin Sardina (born 15 September 1973; German pronunciation: [zaʁˈdiːna], Italian pronunciation: [sarˈdiːna]) is a former member of parliament for the Christian Democratic Union of Germany (CDU).

== Biography ==
Sardina was born and raised in Hamburg, Germany. His father moved from Sicily, Italy, to Germany in the 1960s; his mother is from Hamburg. He received his Staatsexamen from the University of Hamburg in 2002. In 2016, he received a Dr. phil. degree with a dissertation on the history of foreign language teaching in the Soviet occupation zone (SBZ) and East Germany (DDR) from 1945 to 1989.

Sardina works as a lecturer, translator, and consultant, mainly in Berlin, Germany.

== Political career ==
Sardina joined the Christian Democratic Union of Germany (CDU), in 1994. His first public office was as a member of the board of the ministry of education (Behörde für Schule, Jugend und Berufsbildung) in Hamburg from 1997 to 2002. In 2001, he became a member of the board of the ministry of environment and health (Behörde für Umwelt und Gesundheit). From 2001 to 2004, Sardina was the party secretary (whip) of the CDU parliamentary group in the regional assembly (Bezirksversammlung) of the district of Hamburg-Mitte. After the 2004 general elections, his party held the majority of seats and thus he became chairman of the regional assembly.

From 2005 to 2008, Sardina was a member of the Hamburg Parliament, the Hamburgische Bürgerschaft. He also served as the spokesman of the CDU fraction for Asian affairs and as a member of the board of directors of the "Asien-Brücke" (literally: Asia bridge), a Senate-run foundation focusing on development aid to Sri Lanka.
