= List of 2026–27 EuroLeague transactions =

This is a list of all personnel changes for the 2026 EuroLeague off-season and 2026–27 EuroLeague season.

== Retirements ==
Date	Name	EuroLeague Team(s) and played (years)	Age	Notes	Ref.
April 7	(France) Nando de Colo	(Spanish Basketball Federation) Valencia (2010–2011); (Russian Basketball Federation) CSKA Moscow (2014–2019); (Turkish Basketball Federation) Fenerbahçe (2019–2022, 2026); (French Federation of Basketball) ASVEL (2022–2025)	38	2× EuroLeague champion (2016, 2019); EuroLeague MVP (2016); EuroLeague Final Four MVP (2016); 3× All-EuroLeague First Team (2016–2018); 3× All-EuroLeague Second Team (2015, 2019, 2021); Alphonso Ford EuroLeague Top Scorer Trophy (2016); EuroLeague 2010–2020 All-Decade Team (2020); EuroLeague 25th Anniversary Team (2025)	
May 12	(Czech Republic) Jan Veselý	(Basketball Federation of Serbia) Partizan (2008–2011); (Turkish Basketball Federation) Fenerbahçe (2014–2022); (Spanish Basketball Federation) Barcelona (2022–2026)	36	EuroLeague champion (2017); EuroLeague MVP (2019); 3× All-EuroLeague First Team (2016, 2018, 2019)	
June 14	(Montenegro) Bojan Dubljević	(Spanish Basketball Federation) Valencia (2014–2015, 2017–2018, 2019–2021, 2022–2023)	34		
July 23	(Uganda) (United States) Brandon Davies	(Lithuanian Basketball Federation) Žalgiris Kaunas (2017–2019); (Spanish Basketball Federation) Barcelona (2019–2022); (Italian Basketball Federation) Olimpia Milano (2022–2023); (Spanish Basketball Federation) Valencia (2023–2024); (Basketball Federation of Serbia) Partizan (2024–2025)	34	All-EuroLeague First Team (2019); All-EuroLeague Second Team (2021)	
July 24	(Uruguay) (Italy) Jayson Granger	(Spanish Basketball Federation) Unicaja (2013–2015); (Turkish Basketball Federation) Anadolu Efes (2015–2017); (Spanish Basketball Federation) Baskonia (2017–2019, 2021–2022); (German Basketball Federation) Alba Berlin (2020–2021)	36		
August 17	(Serbia) Nikola Kalinić	(Basketball Federation of Serbia) Crvena zvezda (2014–2015, 2021–2022, 2024–2026); (Turkish Basketball Federation) Fenerbahçe (2015–2020); (Spanish Basketball Federation) Valencia (2020–2021); (Spanish Basketball Federation) Barcelona (2022–2024)	34	EuroLeague champion (2017); EuroLeague Finals Top Scorer (2017)	
September 5	(Serbia) Branko Lazić	(Basketball Federation of Serbia) Crvena zvezda (2013–2025)	37		
October 2	(Canada) (Slovenia) Kevin Pangos	(Lithuanian Basketball Federation) Žalgiris Kaunas (2016–2018); (Spanish Basketball Federation) Barcelona (2018–2019); (Russian Basketball Federation) Zenit Saint Petersburg (2020–2021); (Italian Basketball Federation) Olimpia Milano (2022–2023); (Spanish Basketball Federation) Valencia (2023–2024)	33	All-EuroLeague First Team (2021); All-EuroLeague Second Team (2018)	

== Managerial changes ==
Team	Outgoing manager	Manner of departure	Date of vacancy	Position in table	Replaced with	Date of appointment
(Basketball Federation of Serbia) Crvena zvezda	(Basketball Federation of Serbia) Saša Obradović	Sacked	25 May 2026	Pre-season	(Spanish Basketball Federation) Ibon Navarro	12 June 2026
(Hellenic Basketball Federation) Panathinaikos	(Turkish Basketball Federation) Ergin Ataman	Mutual agreement	15 June 2026	Pre-season	(Basketball Federation of Serbia) Željko Obradović	21 June 2026
(French Federation of Basketball) ASVEL	(French Federation of Basketball) Pierric Poupet	Sacked	15 June 2026	Pre-season	(French Federation of Basketball) Tony Parker	27 June 2026
(Italian Basketball Federation) Virtus Bologna	(Basketball Federation of Serbia) Nenad Jakovljević	End of interim period	19 June 2026	Pre-season	(Spanish Basketball Federation) Álex Mumbrú	19 June 2026
(German Basketball Federation) Bayern Munich	(Basketball Federation of Serbia) Svetislav Pešić	Retirement	22 June 2026	Pre-season	(Slovak Basketball Association) (German Basketball Federation) Anton Gavel	29 June 2026
(French Federation of Basketball) Paris	(German Basketball Federation) Julius Thomas	End of interim period	25 June 2026	Pre-season	(French Federation of Basketball) Max Lefèvre	22 July 2026
(Spanish Basketball Federation) Barcelona	(Spanish Basketball Federation) Xavi Pascual	Contract buyout	25 June 2026	Pre-season	(Basketball Federation of Slovenia) Aleksander Sekulić	22 July 2026
(Spanish Basketball Federation) Real Madrid	(Italian Basketball Federation) Sergio Scariolo	Mutual agreement	2 July 2026	Pre-season	(Spanish Basketball Federation) Pedro Martínez	6 July 2026
(Spanish Basketball Federation) Valencia	(Spanish Basketball Federation) Pedro Martínez	Contract buyout	3 July 2026	Pre-season	(Spanish Basketball Federation) Xavi Albert	7 July 2026
(United Arab Emirates Basketball Association) Dubai	(Basketball Federation of Slovenia) Aleksander Sekulić	End of interim period	14 July 2026	Pre-season	(Spanish Basketball Federation) Xavi Pascual	14 July 2026
(Spanish Basketball Federation) Baskonia	(Italian Basketball Federation) Paolo Galbiati	Sacked	14 October 2026	20th (1–4)	(Croatian Basketball Federation) Velimir Perasović	14 October 2026
(Italian Basketball Federation) Olimpia Milano	(Italian Basketball Federation) Giuseppe Poeta	Sacked	6 November 2026	19th (1–9)	(Italian Basketball Federation) Luca Banchi	8 November 2026

== Player movements ==
=== Between two EuroLeague teams ===
Date	Player	From	To	Contract years	Ref.
Off-season
June 16	(United States) Saben Lee	(Turkish Basketball Federation) Anadolu Efes	(Lithuanian Basketball Federation) Žalgiris	2	
June 20	(Lithuania) Marius Grigonis	(Hellenic Basketball Federation) Panathinaikos	(Lithuanian Basketball Federation) Žalgiris	1	
June 24	(Armenia) (United States) Chris Jones	(Israeli Basketball Association) Hapoel Tel Aviv	(Basketball Federation of Serbia) Crvena zvezda	2	
June 24	(France) Moustapha Fall	(Hellenic Basketball Federation) Olympiacos	(Hellenic Basketball Federation) Panathinaikos	2+1	
June 25	(United States) Alec Peters	(Hellenic Basketball Federation) Olympiacos	(Italian Basketball Federation) Olimpia Milano	2	
June 25	(France) Matthew Strazel	(French Federation of Basketball) Monaco	(Turkish Basketball Federation) Anadolu Efes	2+1	
June 28	(United States) Bonzie Colson	(Turkish Basketball Federation) Fenerbahçe	(Israeli Basketball Association) Maccabi Tel Aviv	2	
June 29	(United States) Carsen Edwards	(Italian Basketball Federation) Virtus Bologna	(Lithuanian Basketball Federation) Žalgiris	1+1	
June 30	(France) (United States) Sylvain Francisco	(Lithuanian Basketball Federation) Žalgiris	(French Federation of Basketball) ASVEL	3	
June 30	(France) Terry Tarpey	(French Federation of Basketball) Monaco	(French Federation of Basketball) Paris	1	
July 1	(United States) (Germany) Nick Weiler-Babb	(Turkish Basketball Federation) Anadolu Efes	(French Federation of Basketball) ASVEL	2	
July 2	(United States) Devon Hall	(Turkish Basketball Federation) Fenerbahçe	(Italian Basketball Federation) Olimpia Milano	2	
July 2	(United States) (Bulgaria) Codi Miller-McIntyre	(Basketball Federation of Serbia) Crvena zvezda	(Hellenic Basketball Federation) Olympiacos	3	
July 3	(Germany) (United States) Duane Washington Jr.	(Basketball Federation of Serbia) Partizan	(German Basketball Federation) Bayern Munich	2	
July 3	(United States) Armoni Brooks	(Italian Basketball Federation) Olimpia Milano	(French Federation of Basketball) ASVEL	2	
July 3	(Turkey) Metecan Birsen	(Turkish Basketball Federation) Fenerbahçe	(Turkish Basketball Federation) Beşiktaş	2	
July 3	(Turkey) (United States) Scottie Wilbekin	(Turkish Basketball Federation) Fenerbahçe	(Turkish Basketball Federation) Beşiktaş	2	
July 3	(Mali) Mady Sissoko	(Spanish Basketball Federation) Real Madrid	(Turkish Basketball Federation) Beşiktaş	1	
July 5	(United States) (Germany) Dylan Osetkowski	(Basketball Federation of Serbia) Partizan	(Spanish Basketball Federation) Valencia	2	
July 6	(Italy) Nicola Akele	(Italian Basketball Federation) Virtus Bologna	(Italian Basketball Federation) Olimpia Milano	2	
July 7	(United States) Sterling Brown	(Basketball Federation of Serbia) Partizan	(Lithuanian Basketball Federation) Žalgiris	1+1	
July 7	(Spain) Jaime Pradilla	(Spanish Basketball Federation) Valencia	(Spanish Basketball Federation) Real Madrid	5	
July 7	(United States) (North Macedonia) TJ Shorts II	(Hellenic Basketball Federation) Panathinaikos	(Spanish Basketball Federation) Valencia	2	
July 7	(United States) (Italy) Darius Thompson	(Spanish Basketball Federation) Valencia	(Italian Basketball Federation) Olimpia Milano	2	
July 8	(Dominican Republic) Jean Montero	(Spanish Basketball Federation) Valencia	(Hellenic Basketball Federation) Olympiacos	3	
July 8	(United States) Trent Forrest	(Spanish Basketball Federation) Baskonia	(Turkish Basketball Federation) Fenerbahçe	2+1	
July 9	(Senegal) Brancou Badio	(Spanish Basketball Federation) Valencia	(Hellenic Basketball Federation) Panathinaikos	3	
July 9	(Denmark) Shavon Shields	(Italian Basketball Federation) Olimpia Milano	(Turkish Basketball Federation) Fenerbahçe	2	
July 10	(Angola) Bruno Fernando	(Basketball Federation of Serbia) Partizan	(Turkish Basketball Federation) Anadolu Efes	2	
July 10	(Germany) Isaac Bonga	(Basketball Federation of Serbia) Partizan	(Hellenic Basketball Federation) Panathinaikos	3	
July 10	(United States) Kessler Edwards	(Israeli Basketball Association) Hapoel Tel Aviv	(Italian Basketball Federation) Virtus Bologna	1	
July 11	(United States) Mike James	(French Federation of Basketball) Monaco	(Turkish Basketball Federation) Anadolu Efes	1+1	
July 11	(United States) Braxton Key	(Spanish Basketball Federation) Valencia	(Turkish Basketball Federation) Fenerbahçe	2	
July 12	(Israel) Yam Madar	(Israeli Basketball Association) Hapoel Tel Aviv	(Israeli Basketball Association) Maccabi Tel Aviv	3	
July 13	(United States) Justin Robinson	(French Federation of Basketball) Paris	(Spanish Basketball Federation) Barcelona	2	
July 13	(United States) (Turkey) Shane Larkin	(Turkish Basketball Federation) Anadolu Efes	(Turkish Basketball Federation) Fenerbahçe	2	
July 14	(United States) (Azerbaijan) Zach LeDay	(Italian Basketball Federation) Olimpia Milano	(Israeli Basketball Association) Hapoel Tel Aviv	2	
July 14	(Turkey) Sertaç Şanlı	(Turkish Basketball Federation) Beşiktaş	(Turkish Basketball Federation) Fenerbahçe	1	
July 15	(United States) (Slovenia) Josh Nebo	(Italian Basketball Federation) Olimpia Milano	(Spanish Basketball Federation) Barcelona	3	
July 15	(Czech Republic) Tomáš Satoranský	(Spanish Basketball Federation) Barcelona	(Israeli Basketball Association) Hapoel Tel Aviv	1	
July 15	(United States) Jaron Blossomgame	(French Federation of Basketball) Monaco	(United Arab Emirates Basketball Association) Dubai	2	
July 15	(Germany) (Slovakia) David Krämer	(Spanish Basketball Federation) Real Madrid	(Basketball Federation of Serbia) Crvena zvezda	2	
July 15	(Nigeria) (Canada) Eugene Omoruyi	(Spanish Basketball Federation) Baskonia	(Turkish Basketball Federation) Beşiktaş	1	
July 17	(United States) Johnathan Motley	(Israeli Basketball Association) Hapoel Tel Aviv	(Basketball Federation of Serbia) Crvena zvezda	2	
July 17	(France) Élie Okobo	(French Federation of Basketball) Monaco	(United Arab Emirates Basketball Association) Dubai	2	
July 17	(United States) Will Clyburn	(Spanish Basketball Federation) Barcelona	(Turkish Basketball Federation) Fenerbahçe	1	
July 17	(France) Timothé Luwawu-Cabarrot	(Spanish Basketball Federation) Baskonia	(Spanish Basketball Federation) Real Madrid	2	
July 19	(Central African Republic) (United States) Kevarrius Hayes	(French Federation of Basketball) Monaco	(Basketball Federation of Serbia) Partizan	2	
July 22	(Finland) Mikael Jantunen	(Turkish Basketball Federation) Fenerbahçe	(Spanish Basketball Federation) Real Madrid	2	
July 23	(United States) Lamar Stevens	(French Federation of Basketball) Paris	(Basketball Federation of Serbia) Partizan	2	
July 23	(Italy) Alessandro Pajola	(Italian Basketball Federation) Virtus Bologna	(Basketball Federation of Serbia) Partizan	2	
July 24	(United States) Moses Wright	(Lithuanian Basketball Federation) Žalgiris	(Italian Basketball Federation) Olimpia Milano		
July 26	(Argentina) Luca Vildoza	(Italian Basketball Federation) Virtus Bologna	(Basketball Federation of Serbia) Partizan	2	
July 27	(United States) Collin Malcolm	(Israeli Basketball Association) Hapoel Tel Aviv	(Turkish Basketball Federation) Anadolu Efes	2	
July 28	(Guinea) Mamadi Diakite	(Spanish Basketball Federation) Baskonia	(United Arab Emirates Basketball Association) Dubai		
July 28	(United States) Derek Willis	(French Federation of Basketball) Paris	(Basketball Federation of Serbia) Partizan	2	
July 30	(United States) Miles Norris	(Spanish Basketball Federation) Barcelona	(German Basketball Federation) Bayern Munich	2	
July 30	(France) (United States) Sylvain Francisco	(French Federation of Basketball) ASVEL	(Hellenic Basketball Federation) Panathinaikos	3	
August 1	(South Sudan) (United States) Wenyen Gabriel	(German Basketball Federation) Bayern Munich	(Turkish Basketball Federation) Beşiktaş		
August 3	(Israel) Tamir Blatt	(Israeli Basketball Association) Maccabi Tel Aviv	(Israeli Basketball Association) Hapoel Tel Aviv	3	
August 3	(United States) Armoni Brooks	(French Federation of Basketball) ASVEL	(Spanish Basketball Federation) Valencia	Loan	
August 5	(Germany) Daniel Theis	(French Federation of Basketball) Monaco	(Israeli Basketball Association) Maccabi Tel Aviv	2	
August 5	(Angola) Kevin Kokila	(United Arab Emirates Basketball Association) Dubai	(Italian Basketball Federation) Virtus Bologna	Loan	
August 6	(Georgia (country)) Tornike Shengelia	(Spanish Basketball Federation) Barcelona	(United Arab Emirates Basketball Association) Dubai		
August 6	(United States) Armando Bacot	(Turkish Basketball Federation) Fenerbahçe	(Israeli Basketball Association) Maccabi Tel Aviv	2	
August 7	(United States) Keenan Evans	(Hellenic Basketball Federation) Olympiacos	(Lithuanian Basketball Federation) Žalgiris	1+1	
August 9	(United States) (Germany) Nick Weiler-Babb	(French Federation of Basketball) ASVEL	(Basketball Federation of Serbia) Crvena zvezda	Loan	
August 11	(Ukraine) (Russia) Joel Bolomboy	(Basketball Federation of Serbia) Crvena zvezda	(French Federation of Basketball) ASVEL	2	
August 12	(France) Frank Ntilikina	(Hellenic Basketball Federation) Olympiacos	(French Federation of Basketball) Paris		
August 12	(United States) (North Macedonia) Nate Sestina	(Italian Basketball Federation) Olimpia Milano	(French Federation of Basketball) ASVEL	1	
August 13	(Senegal) Mbaye Ndiaye	(French Federation of Basketball) ASVEL	(Hellenic Basketball Federation) Olympiacos	2	
August 19	(United States) Myles Cale	(Spanish Basketball Federation) Barcelona	(French Federation of Basketball) ASVEL		
August 22	(France) Yoan Makoundou	(French Federation of Basketball) Monaco	(Spanish Basketball Federation) Barcelona	2	
August 31	(Cuba) Jasiel Rivero	(Basketball Federation of Serbia) Crvena zvezda	(Spanish Basketball Federation) Valencia	1 month	
September 7	(United States) (Greece) Thomas Walkup	(Hellenic Basketball Federation) Olympiacos	(United Arab Emirates Basketball Association) Dubai		
September 12	(Brazil) Bruno Caboclo	(United Arab Emirates Basketball Association) Dubai	(Israeli Basketball Association) Hapoel Tel Aviv		
September 15	(Spain) (Montenegro) Nikola Mirotić	(French Federation of Basketball) Monaco	(Spanish Basketball Federation) Valencia	1	
In-season
September 28	(United States) Bryant Dunston	(Italian Basketball Federation) Olimpia Milano	(Hellenic Basketball Federation) Olympiacos	1	
September 29	(Brazil) Márcio Santos	(Israeli Basketball Association) Maccabi Tel Aviv	(Spanish Basketball Federation) Baskonia	2	
October 7	(France) Juhann Begarin	(French Federation of Basketball) Monaco	(French Federation of Basketball) ASVEL	1 month	
October 15	(United States) Lonnie Walker IV	(Israeli Basketball Association) Maccabi Tel Aviv	(Turkish Basketball Federation) Beşiktaş		
November 10	(United States) (Georgia (country)) Kamar Baldwin	(German Basketball Federation) Bayern Munich	(Israeli Basketball Association) Maccabi Tel Aviv		
November 11	(Bosnia and Herzegovina) Kenan Kamenjaš	(United Arab Emirates Basketball Association) Dubai	(Spanish Basketball Federation) Baskonia	Loan	
November 13	(Gabon) Chris Silva	(Turkish Basketball Federation) Fenerbahçe	(Basketball Federation of Serbia) Partizan		
November 20	(Italy) Awudu Abass	(United Arab Emirates Basketball Association) Dubai	(Italian Basketball Federation) Virtus Bologna	2	

=== To a EuroLeague team ===
^{*}	Denotes Euroleague rookie players

Date	Player	From	To	Contract years	Ref.
Off-season
June 16	(Croatia) Dario Šarić	(USA Basketball) Sacramento Kings	(Turkish Basketball Federation) Anadolu Efes	2	
June 19	(Lithuania) Marek Blaževič	(Turkish Basketball Federation) Tofaş	(Lithuanian Basketball Federation) Žalgiris	2+1	
June 26	(Germany) Johannes Thiemann	(Japan Basketball Association) Gunma Crane Thunders	(German Basketball Federation) Bayern Munich	2+1	
June 28	(United States) D.J. Stewart Jr.*	(Basketball Federation of Slovenia) Cedevita Olimpija	(Spanish Basketball Federation) Baskonia	2	
June 29	(United States) Jason Burnell*	(Italian Basketball Federation) Brescia	(Italian Basketball Federation) Olimpia Milano		
June 29	(Italy) Tommaso Baldasso	(Italian Basketball Federation) Derthona	(Italian Basketball Federation) Virtus Bologna	2	
June 28	(Italy) Davide Casarin*	(Italian Basketball Federation) Vanoli Cremona	(Italian Basketball Federation) Virtus Bologna	2	
July 1	(Brazil) Mãozinha Pereira*	(Turkish Basketball Federation) Manisa	(French Federation of Basketball) Paris	1	
July 2	(Sweden) Bobi Klintman*	(USA Basketball) Detroit Pistons	(Italian Basketball Federation) Virtus Bologna		
July 2	(Denmark) Tobias Jensen*	(German Basketball Federation) Ratiopharm Ulm	(German Basketball Federation) Bayern Munich	4	
July 2	(Turkey) Furkan Korkmaz	(Turkish Basketball Federation) Tofaş	(Turkish Basketball Federation) Beşiktaş		
July 3	(Argentina) Gonzalo Corbalán*	(Spanish Basketball Federation) San Pablo Burgos	(Spanish Basketball Federation) Valencia	3	
July 3	(United States) Rasheed Bello*	(Basketball Belgium) Antwerp Giants	(Italian Basketball Federation) Virtus Bologna		
July 4	(South Sudan) (United States) Both Gach*	(French Federation of Basketball) Bourg	(French Federation of Basketball) ASVEL	1	
July 6	(Canada) Marcus Carr*	(German Basketball Federation) Würzburg	(Italian Basketball Federation) Virtus Bologna		
July 7	(France) Yves Pons	(Spanish Basketball Federation) Andorra	(French Federation of Basketball) ASVEL	1	
July 8	(United States) R. J. Cole*	(Italian Basketball Federation) Reyer Venezia	(Italian Basketball Federation) Olimpia Milano		
July 8	(Spain) Santi Yusta	(Spanish Basketball Federation) Zaragoza	(Turkish Basketball Federation) Anadolu Efes	1+1	
July 8	(France) Guerschon Yabusele	(USA Basketball) Chicago Bulls	(Hellenic Basketball Federation) Panathinaikos	3	
July 9	(United States) Austin Wiley*	(Israeli Basketball Association) Hapoel Jerusalem	(German Basketball Federation) Bayern Munich	3	
July 9	(United States) Amir Coffey*	(United States) Phoenix Suns	(Israeli Basketball Association) Hapoel Tel Aviv	1	
July 11	(Spain) Mario Saint-Supéry*	(USA Basketball) Gonzaga University	(Spanish Basketball Federation) Valencia	4	
July 12	(Finland) Olivier Nkamhoua*	(Italian Basketball Federation) Varese	(Spanish Basketball Federation) Barcelona	2	
July 12	(United States) Jaylen Nowell*	(Puerto Rican Basketball Federation) Gigantes de Carolina	(Turkish Basketball Federation) Beşiktaş		
July 13	(United States) T. J. Warren*	(USA Basketball) Westchester Knicks	(French Federation of Basketball) Paris	1	
July 13	(Israel) (Trinidad and Tobago) Khadeen Carrington*	(Israeli Basketball Association) Hapoel Jerusalem	(Israeli Basketball Association) Hapoel Tel Aviv	3	
July 14	(Lithuania) Ignas Sargiūnas*	(Lithuanian Basketball Federation) Rytas	(Turkish Basketball Federation) Fenerbahçe	2+1	
July 15	(Lithuania) Jonas Valančiūnas	(USA Basketball) Denver Nuggets	(Lithuanian Basketball Federation) Žalgiris	2	
July 16	(United States) Marcus Bingham Jr.*	(Russian Basketball Federation) UNICS Kazan	(Turkish Basketball Federation) Fenerbahçe	2	
July 16	(Bulgaria) (United States) Umoja Gibson*	(Basketball Federation of Slovenia) Cedevita Olimpija	(Spanish Basketball Federation) Barcelona	2	
July 16	(United States) Tyson Etienne*	(USA Basketball) Brooklyn Nets	(French Federation of Basketball) Paris		
July 17	(Uruguay) (Italy) Agustín Ubal	(Spanish Basketball Federation) Manresa	(Spanish Basketball Federation) Barcelona	3	
July 17	(Dominican Republic) (Canada) Chris Duarte*	(Spanish Basketball Federation) Unicaja	(Spanish Basketball Federation) Baskonia		
July 18	(United States) Davion Mintz*	(German Basketball Federation) Würzburg	(United Arab Emirates Basketball Association) Dubai		
July 18	(United States) Patrick Baldwin Jr.*	(USA Basketball) Sacramento Kings	(Basketball Federation of Serbia) Crvena zvezda		
July 21	(Nigeria) (United States) Stanley Umude*	(USA Basketball) Austin Spurs	(Spanish Basketball Federation) Barcelona	2	
July 22	(United States) Trent Frazier*	(Russian Basketball Federation) Zenit Saint Petersburg	(Italian Basketball Federation) Virtus Bologna		
July 23	(Poland) Aleksander Balcerowski	(Spanish Basketball Federation) Unicaja	(Spanish Basketball Federation) Barcelona	2	
July 23	(United States) (Senegal) Mouhamadou Gueye*	(USA Basketball) Chicago Bulls	(Spanish Basketball Federation) Valencia		
July 24	(United States) Tyrese Martin*	(USA Basketball) Philadelphia 76ers	(Spanish Basketball Federation) Barcelona	1	
July 25	(Spain) Lucas Marí	(USA Basketball) University of Vermont	(Spanish Basketball Federation) Valencia		
July 25	(Serbia) Nikola Tanasković*	(Basketball Federation of Montenegro) Budućnost	(Basketball Federation of Serbia) Partizan		
July 27	(United Kingdom) Tosan Evbuomwan*	(USA Basketball) Greensboro Swarm	(Spanish Basketball Federation) Barcelona	2	
July 27	(United States) Johnny Juzang*	(Russian Basketball Federation) Zenit Saint Petersburg	(Turkish Basketball Federation) Fenerbahçe	1	
July 27	(Canada) A. J. Lawson*	(Canada Basketball) Toronto Raptors	(Spanish Basketball Federation) Baskonia	2	
July 28	(United States) Wendell Moore Jr.*	(USA Basketball) Detroit Pistons	(Italian Basketball Federation) Virtus Bologna	1	
July 28	(Serbia) Vojin Medarević*	(Basketball Federation of Serbia) Spartak Subotica	(Basketball Federation of Serbia) Crvena zvezda	3	
July 29	(United States) Jacob Toppin*	(USA Basketball) Atlanta Hawks	(Israeli Basketball Association) Hapoel Tel Aviv	3	
July 31	(Montenegro) (United States) Kyle Allman Jr.*	(Turkish Basketball Federation) Türk Telekom	(Basketball Federation of Serbia) Partizan	2	
July 31	(Greece) Lefteris Mantzoukas	(USA Basketball) Oklahoma State University	(Hellenic Basketball Federation) Panathinaikos		
July 31	(United States) Alize Johnson*	(Chinese Basketball Association (organisation)) Shenzhen Leopards	(French Federation of Basketball) Paris		
August 1	(Slovakia) (United States) David DeJulius	(Spanish Basketball Federation) UCAM Murcia	(Turkish Basketball Federation) Beşiktaş	Loan	
August 1	(United States) Eugene German*	(Puerto Rican Basketball Federation) Indios de Mayagüez	(Israeli Basketball Association) Hapoel Tel Aviv		
August 2	(Nigeria) Kaodirichi Akobundu-Ehiogu*	(Spanish Basketball Federation) Manresa	(Lithuanian Basketball Federation) Žalgiris	1+1	
August 6	(France) (Israel) Frédéric Bourdillon	(Israeli Basketball Association) Bnei Herzliya	(Israeli Basketball Association) Hapoel Tel Aviv	1	
August 6	(United States) Damion Baugh*	(Canada Basketball) Calgary Surge	(Spanish Basketball Federation) Baskonia	2	
August 9	(United States) Keaton Wallace*	(USA Basketball) Atlanta Hawks	(Israeli Basketball Association) Maccabi Tel Aviv	2	
August 10	(Australia) Patty Mills*	(Spanish Basketball Federation) Tenerife	(French Federation of Basketball) ASVEL	1	
August 10	(Serbia) Andrej Bjelić*	(Spanish Basketball Federation) Real Madrid B	(Basketball Federation of Serbia) Crvena zvezda	2	
August 12	(United States) MarJon Beauchamp*	(USA Basketball) Philadelphia 76ers	(German Basketball Federation) Bayern Munich	1	
August 14	(Romania) (United States) Fatts Russell*	(Romanian Basketball Federation) U-BT Cluj-Napoca	(Turkish Basketball Federation) Anadolu Efes	1	
August 14	(Ukraine) Max Shulga*	(USA Basketball) Boston Celtics	(Spanish Basketball Federation) Real Madrid	2	
August 15	(France) Olivier Sarr*	(USA Basketball) Cleveland Cavaliers	(Spanish Basketball Federation) Real Madrid	2	
August 16	(Puerto Rico) Ethan Thompson*	(USA Basketball) Indiana Pacers	(Basketball Federation of Serbia) Partizan	2	
August 17	(Spain) (Senegal) Eli Ndiaye	(USA Basketball) College Park Skyhawks	(Spanish Basketball Federation) Real Madrid	2	
August 18	(United States) Garrison Mathews*	(USA Basketball) Indiana Pacers	(Italian Basketball Federation) Olimpia Milano		
August 18	(France) Marc-Owen Fodzo Dada*	(French Federation of Basketball) SLUC Nancy	(French Federation of Basketball) ASVEL		
August 20	(United States) Jae Crowder*	(Puerto Rican Basketball Federation) Vaqueros de Bayamón	(French Federation of Basketball) ASVEL	1	
August 20	(Greece) Nikos Plotas*	(Hellenic Basketball Federation) Promitheas Patras	(Hellenic Basketball Federation) Olympiacos	5	
August 22	(France) Hugo Besson*	(Turkish Basketball Federation) Tofaş	(French Federation of Basketball) ASVEL		
August 23	(United States) Tremont Waters*	(Puerto Rican Basketball Federation) Gigantes de Carolina	(French Federation of Basketball) ASVEL		
August 24	(France) Mathis Dossou-Yovo	(French Federation of Basketball) Nanterre 92	(French Federation of Basketball) ASVEL		
August 24	(United States) TyTy Washington Jr.*	(USA Basketball) Los Angeles Clippers	(French Federation of Basketball) ASVEL		
August 25	(United States) Kenneth Faried	(Puerto Rican Basketball Federation) Cangrejeros de Santurce	(Spanish Basketball Federation) Baskonia	1	
August 28	(United States) Damian Jones*	(Puerto Rican Basketball Federation) Vaqueros de Bayamón	(Spanish Basketball Federation) Real Madrid	1	
September 1	(United States) (Dominican Republic) Justin Minaya*	(USA Basketball) Osceola Magic	(Spanish Basketball Federation) Barcelona	2	
September 6	(Israel) (United States) Max Heidegger	(Spanish Basketball Federation) San Pablo Burgos	(Israeli Basketball Association) Hapoel Tel Aviv		
September 16	(United States) Nick Smith Jr.*	(USA Basketball) Los Angeles Lakers	(Spanish Basketball Federation) Real Madrid	1	
In-season
September 28	(Greece) (United States) George Papas	(Hellenic Basketball Federation) Maroussi	(Hellenic Basketball Federation) Olympiacos	1	
September 28	(France) Bandja Sy	(Romanian Basketball Federation) CSM Oradea	(Basketball Federation of Serbia) Partizan		
October 3	(United States) Cameron Payne	(USA Basketball) Philadelphia 76ers	(Turkish Basketball Federation) Anadolu Efes	1	
October 18	(Cameroon) Christian Koloko*	(USA Basketball) Atlanta Hawks	(Basketball Federation of Serbia) Crvena zvezda		
October 21	(United States) Antonio Reeves*	(USA Basketball) Charlotte Hornets	(Basketball Federation of Serbia) Partizan		
October 22	(United States) John Konchar*	(USA Basketball) Utah Jazz	(Hellenic Basketball Federation) Olympiacos	2	
October 23	(United States) Keenan Evans	(British Basketball) London Lions	(Lithuanian Basketball Federation) Žalgiris	Loan return	
October 23	(United States) Robert Franks*	(Chinese Basketball Association (organisation)) Nanjing Monkey Kings	(Basketball Federation of Serbia) Partizan	1	
October 30	(Canada) Dwight Powell*	(USA Basketball) Dallas Mavericks	(Turkish Basketball Federation) Fenerbahçe	1	
November 11	(Latvia) Rolands Šmits	(Chinese Basketball Association (organisation)) Ningbo Rockets	(Spanish Basketball Federation) Baskonia		
November 15	(Spain) (Senegal) Eli Ndiaye	(Spanish Basketball Federation) Joventut	(Spanish Basketball Federation) Real Madrid	Loan return	
November 16	(Brazil) Marcelinho Huertas	(Spanish Basketball Federation) Tenerife	(United Arab Emirates Basketball Association) Dubai		
November 18	(France) Killian Hayes*	(USA Basketball) Sacramento Kings	(Spanish Basketball Federation) Barcelona	1	
November 18	(Italy) Achille Lonati	(USA Basketball) St. Bonaventure University	(Italian Basketball Federation) Virtus Bologna		

=== Contract extensions ===
Date	Player	Team	New contract	Ref.
Off-season
May 27	(Lithuania) Ąžuolas Tubelis	(Lithuanian Basketball Federation) Žalgiris	2029	
June 9	(Serbia) Dejan Davidovac	(Basketball Federation of Serbia) Crvena zvezda	2028	
June 13	(Nigeria) Tonye Jekiri	(Basketball Federation of Serbia) Partizan	2027	
June 16	(Poland) (United States) Jordan Loyd	(Turkish Basketball Federation) Anadolu Efes	2027	
June 16	(United States) Kobi Simmons	(Spanish Basketball Federation) Baskonia	2028	
June 24	(Italy) (United States) Daniel Hackett	(Italian Basketball Federation) Virtus Bologna	2027	
June 25	(Italy) (Senegal) Mouhamet Diouf	(Italian Basketball Federation) Virtus Bologna		
June 30	(United States) Dwayne Bacon	(United Arab Emirates Basketball Association) Dubai	2028	
July 1	(Canada) Oshae Brissett	(Israeli Basketball Association) Maccabi Tel Aviv	2028	
July 1	(United States) Kameron Taylor	(Spanish Basketball Federation) Valencia	2028	
July 2	(Croatia) Ante Žižić	(Turkish Basketball Federation) Beşiktaş	2027	
July 2	(United States) Anthony Brown	(Turkish Basketball Federation) Beşiktaş	2027	
July 2	(United States) Devon Dotson	(Turkish Basketball Federation) Beşiktaş	2027	
July 2	(Turkey) Berk Uğurlu	(Turkish Basketball Federation) Beşiktaş		
July 2	(United States) McKinley Wright IV	(United Arab Emirates Basketball Association) Dubai	2029	
July 6	(Canada) Mfiondu Kabengele	(United Arab Emirates Basketball Association) Dubai	2028	
July 6	(United States) (Uganda) Ish Wainright	(Israeli Basketball Association) Hapoel Tel Aviv	2028	
July 7	(Nigeria) Tai Odiase	(Israeli Basketball Association) Hapoel Tel Aviv	2029	
July 7	(Italy) Nicolò Melli	(Turkish Basketball Federation) Fenerbahçe	2028	
July 7	(United States) Talen Horton-Tucker	(Turkish Basketball Federation) Fenerbahçe	2027	
July 7	(Gabon) Chris Silva	(Turkish Basketball Federation) Fenerbahçe	2027+1	
July 8	(Senegal) Mbaye Ndiaye	(French Federation of Basketball) ASVEL	2029	
July 8	(United States) (Israel) John DiBartolomeo	(Israeli Basketball Association) Maccabi Tel Aviv	2028	
July 9	(United States) Jared Butler	(Basketball Federation of Serbia) Crvena zvezda	2028	
July 10	(Spain) Joel Parra	(Spanish Basketball Federation) Barcelona	2030	
July 10	(Italy) (Senegal) Ousmane Diop	(Italian Basketball Federation) Olimpia Milano		
July 10	(United States) Antonio Blakeney	(Israeli Basketball Association) Hapoel Tel Aviv	2029	
July 10	(Greece) Kostas Papanikolaou	(Hellenic Basketball Federation) Olympiacos	2028	
July 11	(Italy) Stefano Tonut	(Italian Basketball Federation) Olimpia Milano		
July 11	(United States) Elijah Bryant	(Israeli Basketball Association) Hapoel Tel Aviv	2029	
July 12	(United States) (Nigeria) Daniel Oturu	(Israeli Basketball Association) Hapoel Tel Aviv	2029	
July 15	(Spain) Juancho Hernangómez	(Hellenic Basketball Federation) Panathinaikos	2030	
July 21	(Serbia) Vanja Marinković	(Basketball Federation of Serbia) Partizan	2027+1	
July 21	(Turkey) Melih Mahmutoğlu	(Turkish Basketball Federation) Fenerbahçe	2027	
July 24	(Spain) Sergio Llull	(Spanish Basketball Federation) Real Madrid	2027	
July 27	(Denmark) Gabriel Lundberg	(Israeli Basketball Association) Maccabi Tel Aviv	2029	
July 27	(Israel) Tomer Ginat	(Israeli Basketball Association) Hapoel Tel Aviv	2030	
August 7	(United States) Daulton Hommes	(French Federation of Basketball) Paris	2027	
August 21	(France) Edwin Jackson	(French Federation of Basketball) ASVEL		
August 21	(United States) David Lighty	(French Federation of Basketball) ASVEL		
September 22	(United States) Nigel Williams-Goss	(Lithuanian Basketball Federation) Žalgiris	2029	
In-season
September 29	(Israel) Roman Sorkin	(Israeli Basketball Association) Maccabi Tel Aviv	2030	
September 30	(Cuba) Jasiel Rivero	(Spanish Basketball Federation) Valencia	2027	

=== Leaving a EuroLeague team ===
Date	Player	From	To	Ref.
Off-season
June 15	(Greece) (United States) Nick Calathes	(Basketball Federation of Serbia) Partizan	(Hellenic Basketball Federation) PAOK	
June 19	(Brazil) Yago dos Santos	(Italian Basketball Federation) Virtus Bologna	(Brazilian Basketball Confederation) Flamengo	
June 22	(France) Adam Atamna	(French Federation of Basketball) ASVEL	(German Basketball Federation) Ratiopharm Ulm	
June 22	(United States) Kenneth Faried	(Hellenic Basketball Federation) Panathinaikos	(Puerto Rican Basketball Federation) Cangrejeros de Santurce	
June 23	(United States) Shaquille Harrison	(French Federation of Basketball) ASVEL	(Turkish Basketball Federation) Trabzonspor	
June 23	(United States) Zac Seljaas	(French Federation of Basketball) ASVEL	(Italian Basketball Federation) Napoli	
June 24	(France) Armel Traoré	(French Federation of Basketball) ASVEL	(German Basketball Federation) Ratiopharm Ulm	
June 24	(Canada) Khem Birch	(Turkish Basketball Federation) Fenerbahçe	(Hellenic Basketball Federation) Aris	
June 26	(France) Bastien Vautier	(French Federation of Basketball) ASVEL	(Spanish Basketball Federation) Bilbao	
June 29	(Lithuania) Gytis Radzevičius	(Spanish Basketball Federation) Baskonia	(Lithuanian Basketball Federation) Rytas	
June 30	(Argentina) Juani Marcos	(Spanish Basketball Federation) Barcelona	(Spanish Basketball Federation) UCAM Murcia	
July 1	(United States) Shaquielle McKissic	(Hellenic Basketball Federation) Olympiacos	(Turkish Basketball Federation) Türk Telekom	
July 1	(Canada) Isiaha Mike	(German Basketball Federation) Bayern Munich	(Turkish Basketball Federation) Bahçeşehir Koleji	
July 2	(North Macedonia) Nenad Dimitrijević	(German Basketball Federation) Bayern Munich	(Hellenic Basketball Federation) Aris	
July 2	(United States) Glynn Watson Jr.	(French Federation of Basketball) ASVEL	(Italian Basketball Federation) Reyer Venezia	
July 3	(Spain) Sergio de Larrea	(Spanish Basketball Federation) Valencia	(USA Basketball) Dallas Mavericks	
July 4	(Spain) Xabier López-Arostegui	(Spanish Basketball Federation) Valencia	(Spanish Basketball Federation) Tenerife	
July 6	(United Kingdom) Quinn Ellis	(Italian Basketball Federation) Olimpia Milano	(USA Basketball) St. John's University	
July 7	(Turkey) Şehmus Hazer	(Turkish Basketball Federation) Anadolu Efes	(Turkish Basketball Federation) Galatasaray	
July 8	(Germany) Karim Jallow	(Italian Basketball Federation) Virtus Bologna	(Italian Basketball Federation) Derthona	
July 8	(France) Melvin Ajinça	(French Federation of Basketball) ASVEL	(French Federation of Basketball) Le Mans Sarthe	
July 8	(Canada) Xavier Rathan-Mayes	(German Basketball Federation) Bayern Munich	(Russian Basketball Federation) UNICS Kazan	
July 8	(Spain) Isaac Nogués	(Spanish Basketball Federation) Valencia	(Spanish Basketball Federation) Joventut	
July 8	(United States) Matt Morgan	(Italian Basketball Federation) Virtus Bologna	(Hellenic Basketball Federation) Aris	
July 10	(Turkey) (Bosnia and Herzegovina) Tarik Biberović	(Turkish Basketball Federation) Fenerbahçe	(USA Basketball) Dallas Mavericks	
July 10	(Netherlands) Jesse Edwards	(Spanish Basketball Federation) Baskonia	(Italian Basketball Federation) BC Roma	
July 10	(Italy) Nico Mannion	(Italian Basketball Federation) Olimpia Milano	(Italian Basketball Federation) BC Roma	
July 11	(Canada) Trey Lyles	(Spanish Basketball Federation) Real Madrid	(USA Basketball) Minnesota Timberwolves	
July 11	(Serbia) Uroš Plavšić	(Basketball Federation of Serbia) Crvena zvezda	(Romanian Basketball Federation) U-BT Cluj-Napoca	
July 13	(United States) (Ivory Coast) Matt Costello	(Spanish Basketball Federation) Valencia	(Japan Basketball Association) Chiba Jets	
July 14	(Lithuania) Ignas Brazdeikis	(Lithuanian Basketball Federation) Žalgiris	(Spanish Basketball Federation) Unicaja	
July 14	(United States) Zach Hankins	(Israeli Basketball Association) Maccabi Tel Aviv	(Turkish Basketball Federation) Bandırma Bordo	
July 15	(Argentina) Nicolás Laprovíttola	(Spanish Basketball Federation) Barcelona	(Spanish Basketball Federation) Joventut	
July 16	(Serbia) Aleksa Avramović	(United Arab Emirates Basketball Association) Dubai	(Turkish Basketball Federation) Bahçeşehir Koleji	
July 19	(Serbia) Stefan Jović	(German Basketball Federation) Bayern Munich	(Hellenic Basketball Federation) Aris	
July 19	(United States) Jeff Dowtin Jr.	(Israeli Basketball Association) Maccabi Tel Aviv	(Italian Basketball Federation) Napoli	
July 20	(Turkey) Cedi Osman	(Hellenic Basketball Federation) Panathinaikos	(Hellenic Basketball Federation) PAOK	
July 22	(Lithuania) Laurynas Birutis	(Lithuanian Basketball Federation) Žalgiris	(Spanish Basketball Federation) Zaragoza	
July 23	(Spain) Rafa Villar	(Spanish Basketball Federation) Baskonia	(Spanish Basketball Federation) Manresa	
July 24	(Greece) Vassilis Toliopoulos	(Hellenic Basketball Federation) Panathinaikos	(Hellenic Basketball Federation) Aris	
July 27	(Germany) Leon Kratzer	(German Basketball Federation) Bayern Munich	(German Basketball Federation) Telekom Baskets Bonn	
July 28	(Spain) Willy Hernangómez	(Spanish Basketball Federation) Barcelona	(Spanish Basketball Federation) Unicaja	
July 31	(United States) Nate Mason	(United Arab Emirates Basketball Association) Dubai	(Russian Basketball Federation) Zenit Saint Petersburg	
July 31	(United States) Shake Milton	(Basketball Federation of Serbia) Partizan	(Israeli Basketball Association) Hapoel Jerusalem	
July 31	(Croatia) Mario Hezonja	(Spanish Basketball Federation) Real Madrid	(USA Basketball) Cleveland Cavaliers	
August 2	(Latvia) Artūrs Žagars	(Turkish Basketball Federation) Fenerbahçe	(Chinese Basketball Association (organisation)) Zhejiang Golden Bulls	
August 4	(United States) Alpha Diallo	(French Federation of Basketball) Monaco	(USA Basketball) Denver Nuggets	
August 4	(Cameroon) (Italy) Paul Eboua	(Italian Basketball Federation) Olimpia Milano	(Italian Basketball Federation) Derthona	
August 5	(Senegal) Youssoupha Fall	(Spanish Basketball Federation) Barcelona	(Chinese Basketball Association (organisation)) Nanjing Monkey Kings	
August 6	(United States) Boogie Ellis	(United Arab Emirates Basketball Association) Dubai	(Spanish Basketball Federation) Joventut	
August 6	(United States) Matt Ryan	(United Arab Emirates Basketball Association) Dubai	(Italian Basketball Federation) Maxima Roma	
August 6	(Serbia) Aleksej Pokuševski	(Basketball Federation of Serbia) Partizan	(Russian Basketball Federation) Lokomotiv Kuban	
August 7	(United States) Keenan Evans	(Lithuanian Basketball Federation) Žalgiris	(British Basketball) London Lions	
August 9	(Colombia) Braian Angola	(French Federation of Basketball) ASVEL	(Japan Basketball Association) Toyama Grouses	
August 12	(United States) Levi Randolph	(Israeli Basketball Association) Hapoel Tel Aviv	(Japan Basketball Association) Nagasaki Velca	
August 20	(Spain) Izan Almansa	(Spanish Basketball Federation) Real Madrid	(USA Basketball) Gonzaga University	
August 21	(United States) Isaiah Canaan	(Basketball Federation of Serbia) Crvena zvezda	(Turkish Basketball Federation) Trabzonspor	
August 21	(Greece) Alexandros Samodurov	(Hellenic Basketball Federation) Panathinaikos	(USA Basketball) University of North Carolina	
August 24	(Latvia) Rolands Šmits	(Turkish Basketball Federation) Anadolu Efes	(Chinese Basketball Association (organisation)) Ningbo Rockets	
September 1	(Angola) Jilson Bango	(Turkish Basketball Federation) Fenerbahçe	(Spanish Basketball Federation) Zaragoza	
September 2	(Senegal) Khalifa Diop	(Spanish Basketball Federation) Baskonia	(USA Basketball) Cleveland Cavaliers	
September 8	(United States) David McCormack	(German Basketball Federation) Bayern Munich	(Russian Basketball Federation) UNICS Kazan	
September 10	(Greece) Giannoulis Larentzakis	(Hellenic Basketball Federation) Olympiacos	(Hellenic Basketball Federation) AEK	
September 11	(Spain) (Senegal) Eli Ndiaye	(Spanish Basketball Federation) Real Madrid	(Spanish Basketball Federation) Joventut	
September 18	(France) Thomas Heurtel	(French Federation of Basketball) ASVEL	(Hellenic Basketball Federation) AEK	
September 19	(United States) Markquis Nowell	(Spanish Basketball Federation) Baskonia	(USA Basketball) Laketown Squadron	
In-season
September 25	(United States) Brandon Boston Jr.	(Turkish Basketball Federation) Fenerbahçe	(USA Basketball) Chicago Bulls	
September 25	(United States) (Spain) Lorenzo Brown	(Italian Basketball Federation) Olimpia Milano	(Israeli Basketball Association) Hapoel Jerusalem	
September 28	(United States) Cole Swider	(Turkish Basketball Federation) Anadolu Efes	(USA Basketball) Coachella Valley Lakers	
October 4	(Lithuania) Donatas Motiejūnas	(Basketball Federation of Serbia) Crvena zvezda	(Hellenic Basketball Federation) PAOK	
October 6	(France) Amath M'Baye	(French Federation of Basketball) Paris	(Russian Basketball Federation) CSKA Moscow	
October 13	(France) (Ghana) Yakuba Ouattara	(French Federation of Basketball) Paris	(Turkish Basketball Federation) Karşıyaka	
October 14	(Puerto Rico) (United States) Markus Howard	(Spanish Basketball Federation) Baskonia	(Russian Basketball Federation) Zenit Saint Petersburg	
October 16	(Spain) Yankuba Sima	(Spanish Basketball Federation) Valencia	(German Basketball Federation) Alba Berlin	
October 20	(Italy) (Senegal) Saliou Niang	(Italian Basketball Federation) Virtus Bologna	(USA Basketball) Louisiana State University	
October 23	(United States) Jabari Parker	(Basketball Federation of Serbia) Partizan		
October 30	(France) Bandja Sy	(Basketball Federation of Serbia) Partizan	(Lithuanian Basketball Federation) Lietkabelis	
November 9	(Lithuania) Mantas Rubštavičius	(Lithuanian Basketball Federation) Žalgiris	(Turkish Basketball Federation) Tofaş	
November 16	(United States) John Konchar	(Hellenic Basketball Federation) Olympiacos		

== See also ==
- List of 2026–27 NBA season transactions
