= Dillon Brooks =

Canadian basketball player (born 1996)

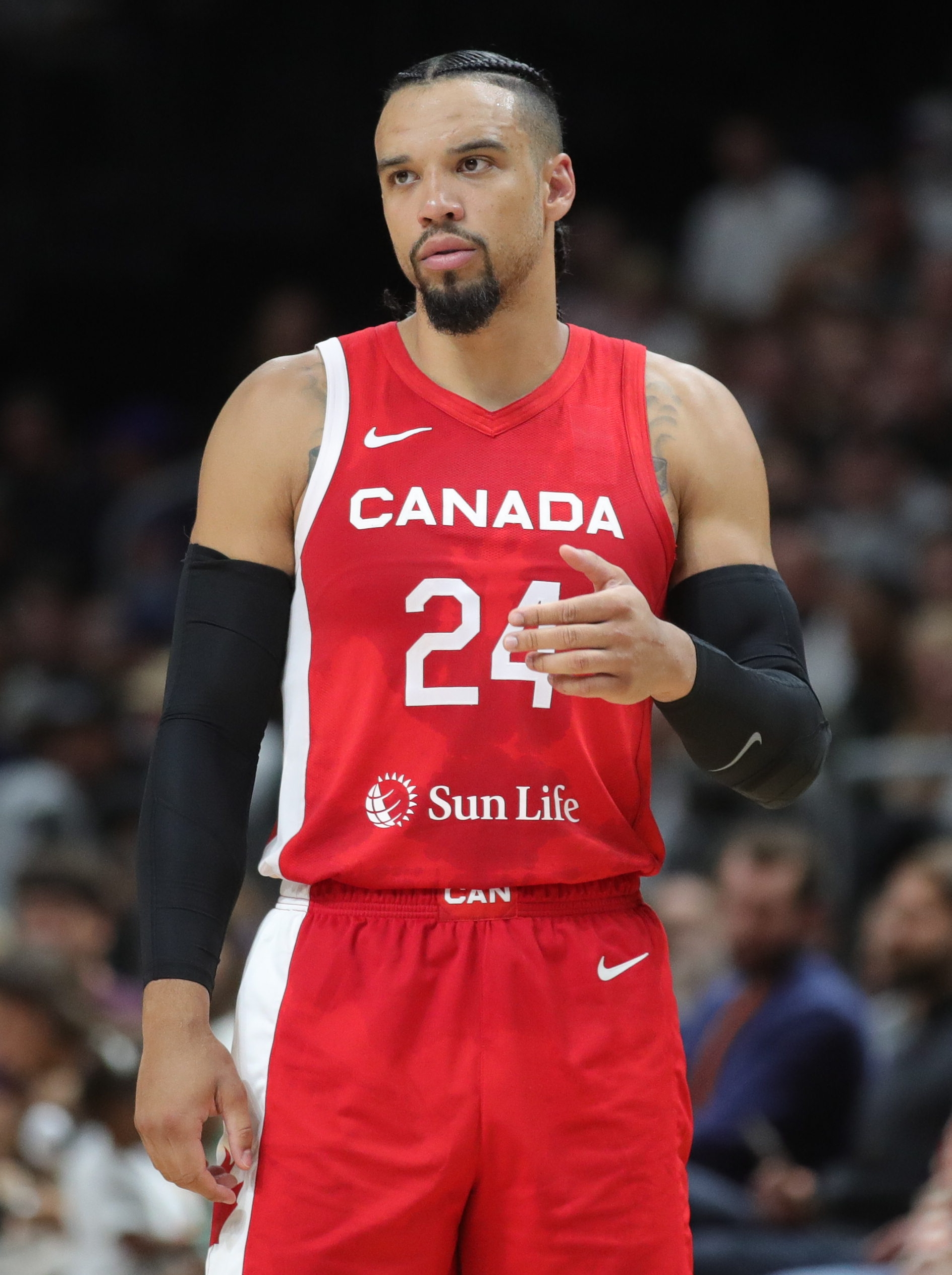
- Brooks with Canada in 2023

No. 3 – Phoenix Suns
- Position: Small forward / shooting guard
- League: NBA

Personal information
- Born: January 22, 1996 (age 30) Mississauga, Ontario, Canada
- Listed height: 6 ft 7 in (2.01 m)
- Listed weight: 225 lb (102 kg)

Career information
- High school: Father Henry Carr (Toronto, Ontario); Findlay Prep (Henderson, Nevada)
- College: Oregon (2014–2017)
- NBA draft: 2017: 2nd round, 45th overall pick
- Drafted by: Houston Rockets
- Playing career: 2017–present

Career history
- 2017–2023: Memphis Grizzlies
- 2023–2025: Houston Rockets
- 2025–present: Phoenix Suns

Career highlights
- NBA All-Defensive Second Team (2023); Consensus second-team All-American (2017); Third-team All-American – SN (2016); Pac-12 Player of the Year (2017); 2× First-team All-Pac-12 (2016, 2017); Pac-12 All-Freshman team (2015)
- Stats at NBA.com
- Stats at Basketball Reference
Medals
Men's basketball
Representing Canada
FIBA World Cup
Bronze medal – third place	2023 Philippines–Japan–Indonesia
Pan American Games
Silver medal – second place	2015 Toronto	Team

Dillon Brooks (/ˈdɪlən/ DIL-ən; born January 22, 1996) is a Canadian professional basketball player for the Phoenix Suns of the National Basketball Association (NBA). He played college basketball for the Oregon Ducks, where he was named a consensus second-team All-American and earned conference player of the year honors in the Pac-12 in 2017. Brooks was selected in the second round of the 2017 NBA draft. He began his career with the Memphis Grizzlies, earning NBA All-Defensive Second Team honors in 2023. He was traded to the Houston Rockets in July 2023 and was later dealt to the Suns after two seasons with Houston. In the same year, Brooks was named the Best Defensive Player after helping the Canada national team to bronze in the FIBA Basketball World Cup.

Brooks has developed a controversial reputation for his trash talk and physical play, though others consider him a culture setter. Embracing the attention surrounding his on-court persona, he has adopted the nickname "(Dillon) the Villain".

== College career ==
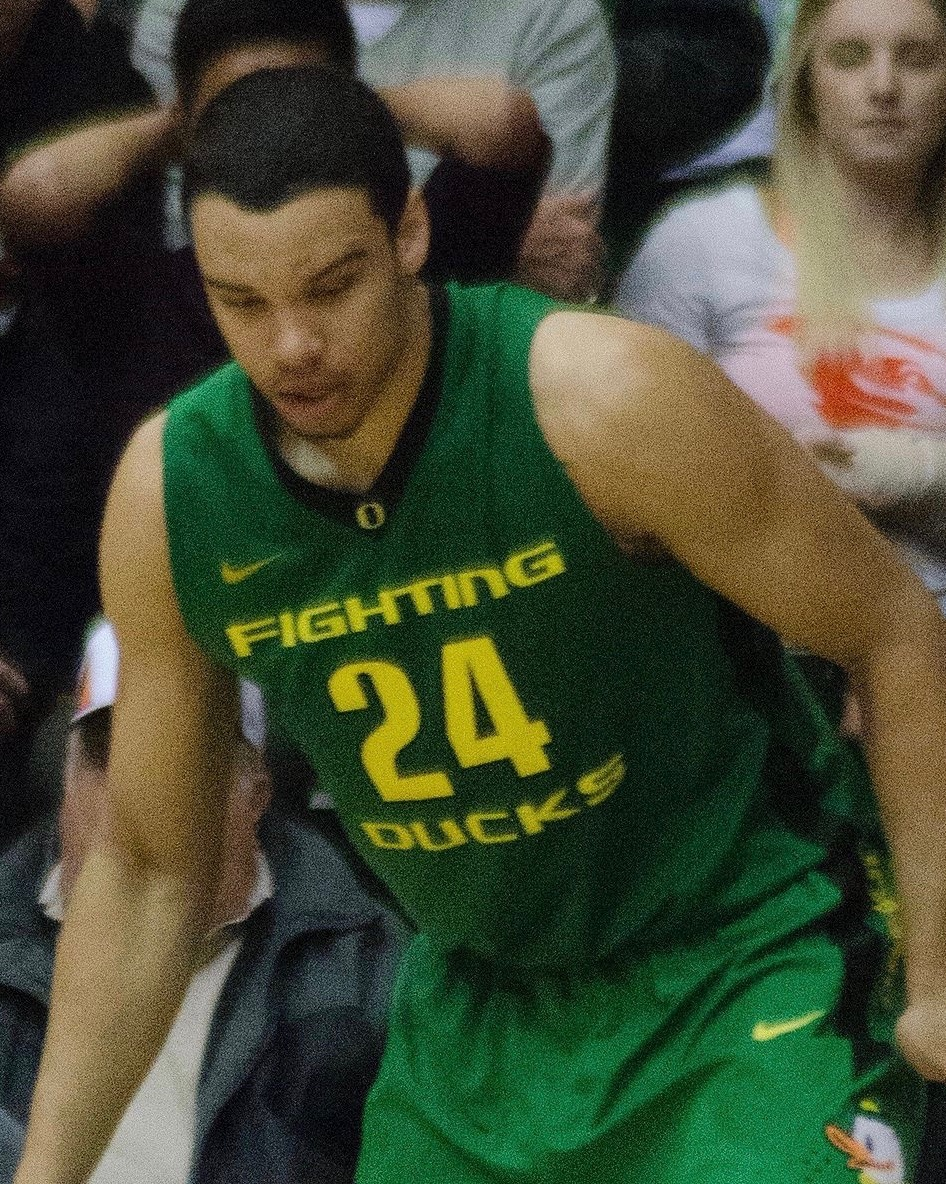
Brooks with Oregon in 2015

Brooks, a small forward from Mississauga, Ontario, went to the University of Oregon after playing at Father Henry Carr Catholic Secondary School in Toronto and Findlay Prep in Henderson, Nevada. As a freshman, he averaged 11.5 points per game and was named to the Pac-12 Conference all-freshman team. As a sophomore, Brooks led the Ducks to the Pac-12 Conference regular season title and a top ten national ranking. At the close of the season, he was named first-team All-Pac-12 and a third-team All-American by the Sporting News. He was also named the District IX player of the year by the United States Basketball Writers Association (USBWA). Brooks averaged 16.7 points, 5.4 rebounds, and 3.1 assists per game.

After the conclusion of the 2015–16 season, Brooks said he would remain with Oregon for a third season. He suffered a foot injury in the summer of 2016 and did not play in Oregon's offseason trip to Spain. On November 7, 2016, Brooks was named to the Associated Press' preseason All-America team. During his three seasons of college career Brooks averaged 14.8 points, 4.5 rebounds and 2.6 assists in 28.9 minutes per game.

Shortly after the 2016–17 season, he declared himself eligible for the 2017 NBA draft and hired an agent, ending his college career.

== Professional career ==
=== Memphis Grizzlies (2017–2023) ===
Brooks was drafted by the Houston Rockets with the 45th pick in the 2017 NBA draft and then was immediately traded to the Memphis Grizzlies. On July 21, 2017, the Grizzlies signed Brooks to his rookie scale contract. On October 18, 2017, during the Grizzlies' season opener, Brooks scored 19 points, the most points scored by a Canadian-born player in an NBA debut.

On April 11, 2018, Brooks scored 36 points along with seven rebounds, one assist, and two steals in a 137–123 loss against the Oklahoma City Thunder. In December 2018, Brooks was thought to be involved in a failed three-way trade between Memphis, the Washington Wizards and the Phoenix Suns; the trade faltered over confusion between Brooks and his similarly named teammate, MarShon Brooks, as the Memphis front office did not intend to trade Dillon while the other teams expected him and not MarShon.

On January 5, 2019, Brooks suffered from a ruptured ligament in his right big toe and underwent a successful surgery to repair it on January 11, 2019. Brooks missed the remainder of the 2018–19 season.

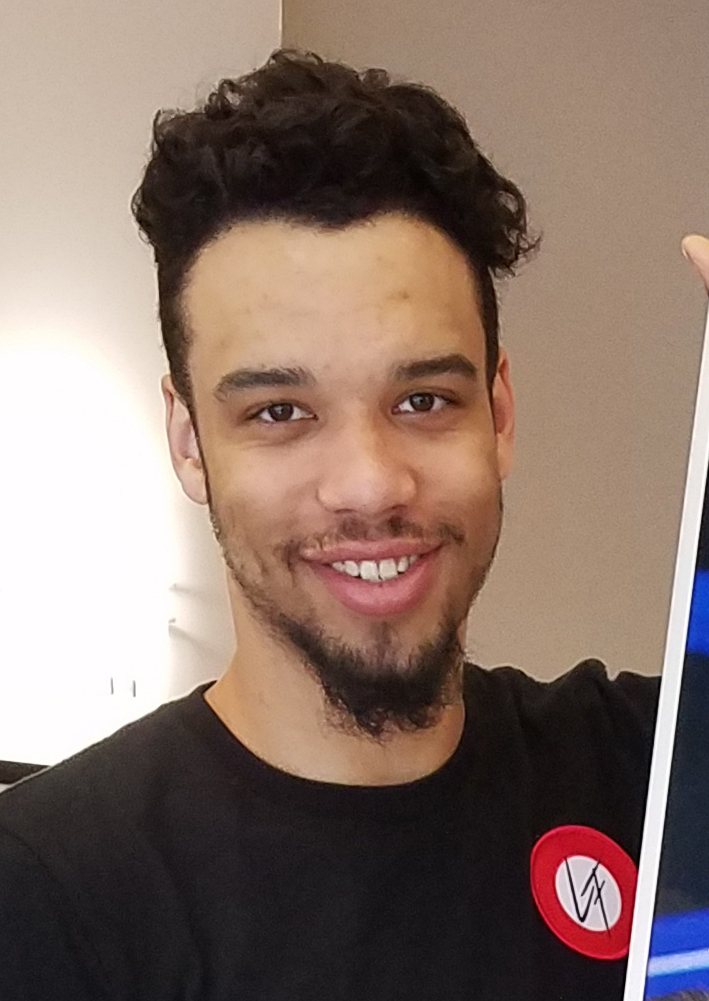
Brooks in 2018

Brooks began the 2019–20 season as the Grizzlies' starting shooting guard. After averaging 16.1 points per game over the first half of the season, on February 5, 2020, he signed a three-year, $35 million extension with the Grizzlies.

On February 28, 2020, Brooks scored a season-high 32 points, along with getting two rebounds, one assist and one block in a 104–101 loss against the Sacramento Kings.

On May 23, 2021, Brooks made his NBA playoff debut, scoring a season-high 31 points, along with seven rebounds, to help the Grizzlies to a 112–109 Game 1 victory over the top-seeded Utah Jazz. The Grizzlies would go on to get eliminated and lose the series in five games.

On October 12, 2021, it was announced that Brooks would miss two to three weeks due to a fracture in his left hand. On December 19, he scored a career high 37 points in a 105–100 loss to the Portland Trail Blazers. On January 8, 2022, during a 123–108 win over the Los Angeles Clippers, Brooks suffered a left ankle injury. The next day, he was ruled out for 3-to-5 weeks with injury, which was diagnosed as an ankle sprain. On April 16, during Game 1 of the first round of the playoffs, Brooks scored 24 points in a 117–130 loss to the Minnesota Timberwolves.

In Game 2 of the 2022 Western Conference semifinals against the Golden State Warriors, Brooks was assessed a flagrant 2 and ejected after he chased down the Warriors' Gary Payton II and hit him in the head when he was in the air, going up for a fast-break layup; Payton fell hard and fractured his left elbow. Brooks was suspended for Game 3 of the series. The Grizzlies would go on to lose the series in six games.

On December 17, 2022, Brooks scored a team-leading 32 points during a 115–109 loss to the Oklahoma City Thunder. On February 2, 2023, Brooks was assessed a flagrant 2 foul and ejected for punching Cleveland Cavaliers player Donovan Mitchell in the groin. The next day, the NBA suspended Brooks for one game without pay for his actions. On March 4, he was suspended for one game without pay for incurring his 16th technical foul of the season. On March 17, Brooks was fined $35,000 by the NBA after he shoved a cameraman to the floor during a game two days earlier against the Miami Heat. On March 21, he was suspended for one game without pay for receiving two more technical fouls, pushing his total to 18 for the season. At the end of the season, Brooks was named for the first time to the NBA All-Defensive Second team.

During Memphis' 2023 NBA playoffs series against the Los Angeles Lakers, Brooks openly criticized his opponent LeBron James for being "old", drawing scrutiny. Brooks was ejected after committing a flagrant 2 foul just 17 seconds into the second half of the Grizzlies–Lakers Game 3 matchup because of hitting James with a hit below the belt. Memphis would go on to lose the series in six games.

=== Houston Rockets (2023–2025) ===
On July 8, 2023, Brooks was acquired by the Houston Rockets as part of a sign-and-trade agreement, signing a four-year, $86 million contract. On October 26, he made his Rockets debut, scoring 14 points along with four rebounds and two assists in a 116–86 loss to the Orlando Magic. On February 14, 2024, Brooks recorded a 19-point, 10 rebound double-double during a 121–113 loss to the Memphis Grizzlies.

On January 27, 2025, Brooks put up a career-high and Rockets franchise-record ten three-pointers en route to 36 points in a 114–112 win over the Boston Celtics.

=== Phoenix Suns (2025–present) ===
On July 6, 2025, Brooks, alongside Jalen Green, was traded to the Phoenix Suns via a seven-team trade that sent Kevin Durant to the Rockets. On November 17, Brooks was fined $25,000 for making a lewd gesture on the court during a game against the Indiana Pacers. Brooks scored 18 points on six-of-nine field goals in a 116–114 loss against the Los Angeles Lakers on December 14. The game was noted for several tense incidents between him and LeBron James, most notably after Brooks had made a clutch three pointer over James to give the Suns a one-point lead with 12.2 seconds left in the fourth quarter. Brooks, believing that James had committed an uncalled foul against him, bumped the latter's shoulder in frustration, resulting in his second technical foul and ejection from the game.

On January 29, 2026, Brooks scored a career-high 40 points in a 114–96 win over the Detroit Pistons. On February 14, Brooks was suspended for one game without pay for receiving his 16th technical foul of the 2025–2026 season. On February 23, Brooks was ruled out for 4-to-6 weeks after suffering a broken left hand two days prior in a game against the Orlando Magic. On April 6, 2026, Brooks avoided a suspension after receiving his 18th technical foul in the game against the Chicago Bulls. During the season, Brooks averaged a career-high 20.2 points per game and helped the Suns finish with a 45–37 record, exceeding expectations after a disappointing 2024–25 season.

Going into the playoffs, the eighth-seeded Suns faced the reigning champion and top seed Oklahoma City Thunder during their first-round series. Brooks made his playoff debut for the Suns on April 19, recording 18 points, seven rebounds, and two assists in a 119–84 Game 1 loss. On April 22, he put up 30 points and six rebounds in a 120–107 Game 2 loss. On April 25, Brooks scored a playoff career-high 33 points, alongside seven rebounds, in a 121–109 Game 3 loss. The Suns wound up being swept by the Thunder, with Brooks averaging 26.0 points per game as their leading scorer in the playoffs.

On August 5, 2026, the Suns and Brooks agreed to a three–year, $73 million contract extension, locking him in through the 2029–30 season.

== National team career ==
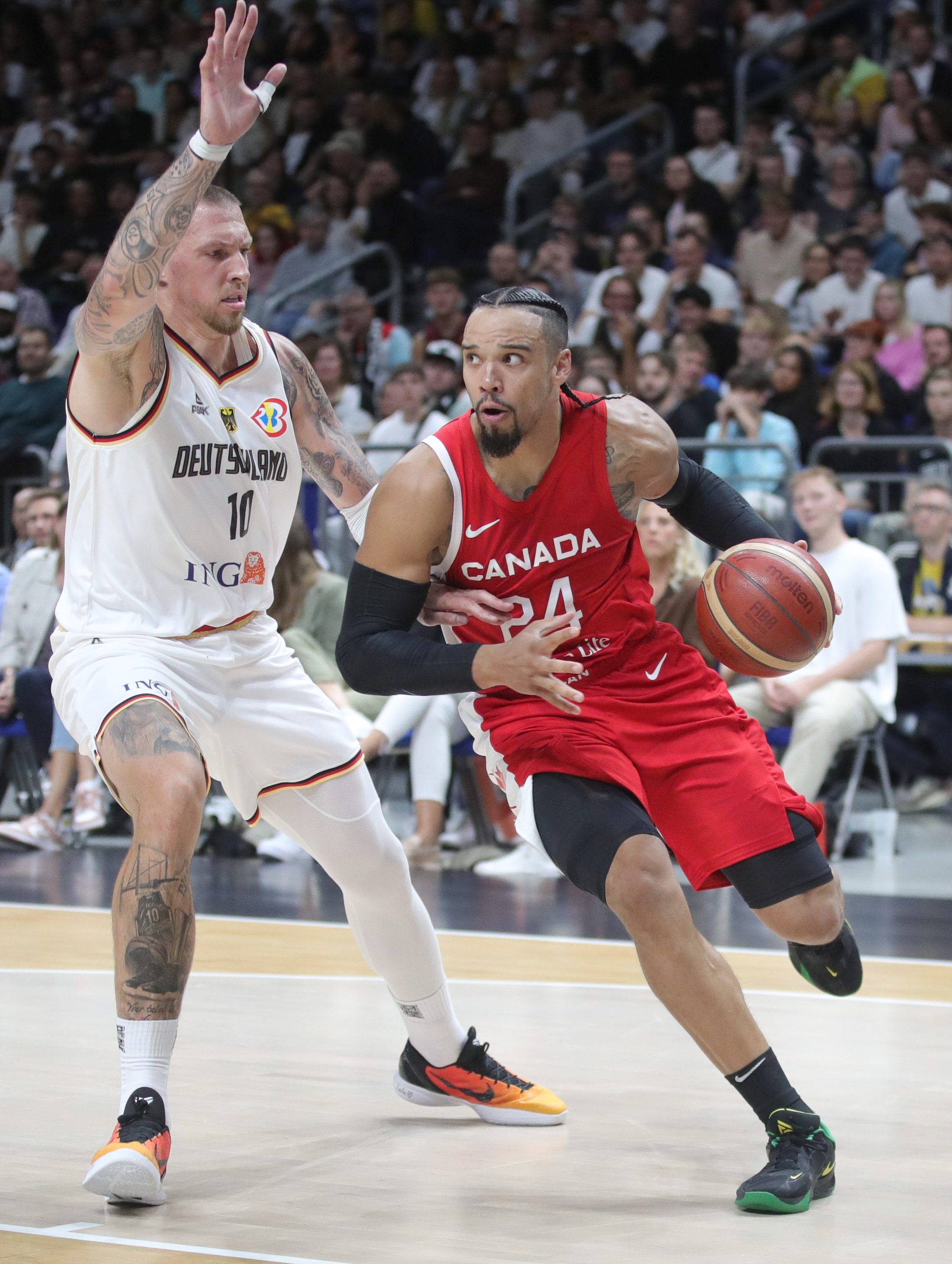
Brooks with Canada prior to the 2023 FIBA Basketball World Cup

Brooks played for the Canadian national team in the 2015 Pan American Games, where the team won the silver medal.

On May 24, 2022, Brooks was one of fourteen players to agree to a three-year commitment to play with the Canadian senior men's national team, aiming to break a decades-long trend of failing to qualify for the Olympic basketball tournament. They achieved this goal at the 2023 FIBA World Cup, and won the bronze medal, Canada's first global tournament medal in basketball since 1936. Brooks played a crucial role, recording a team-best 39 points in their victory over the United States. This was a single-game scoring record for a Canadian player at the World Cup, surpassing Carl Ridd's previous high of 37 at the 1954 edition. Brooks was named Best Defensive Player of the tournament by FIBA.

He was named to Canada's roster for the 2024 Summer Olympics in Paris. After a strong unbeaten performance in the group stage, which was deemed the "group of death" by experts, Canada was surprisingly eliminated in the quarterfinals by hosts France.. Brooks averaged 11.3 points, 3.8 rebounds, and 1.5 assists over 4 games.

== Business ventures ==
In 2024, Brooks became an angel investor in Panda Hub, a mobile car detailing marketplace operating in North America. His involvement began as a customer in Houston, Texas, where he utilized the service and later decided to invest, citing the company's innovative approach to simplifying car care through technology.

== Personal life ==
On June 26, 2025, TMZ first reported that Brooks was filing a restraining order on his now ex-girlfriend Heather Andrews (who first met Brooks back in 2018 and later birthed two children with him while they were together) due to her destroying his belongings and enacting other dangerous behavior against him that would have hurt him personally and/or professionally, including threats of cutting off all of his fingers and even threatening Brooks' own mom. His restraining order would come one year after Andrews submitted her own restraining order against him.

On March 6, 2026, Brooks was reportedly arrested for driving under the influence in Scottsdale, Arizona.

== Career statistics ==
Legend
GP	Games played	GS	Games started	MPG	Minutes per game
FG%	Field goal percentage	3P%	3-point field goal percentage	FT%	Free throw percentage
RPG	Rebounds per game	APG	Assists per game	SPG	Steals per game
BPG	Blocks per game	PPG	Points per game	**Bold**	Career high
*	Led the league

=== NBA ===
==== Regular season ====
Year	Team	GP	GS	MPG	FG%	3P%	FT%	RPG	APG	SPG	BPG	PPG
2017–18	Memphis	**82***	74	28.7	**.440**	.356	.747	3.1	1.6	.9	.2	11.0
2018–19	Memphis	18	0	18.3	.402	.375	.733	1.7	.9	.6	.2	7.5
2019–20	Memphis	73	73*	28.9	.407	.358	.808	3.3	2.1	.9	**.4**	16.2
2020–21	Memphis	67	67	29.8	.419	.344	.815	2.9	2.3	**1.2**	**.4**	17.2
2021–22	Memphis	32	31	27.7	.432	.309	**.849**	3.2	**2.8**	1.1	.3	18.4
2022–23	Memphis	73	73	30.3	.396	.326	.779	3.3	2.6	.9	.2	14.3
2023–24	Houston	72	72	30.9	.428	.359	.844	3.4	1.7	.9	.1	12.7
2024–25	Houston	75	**75**	**31.8**	.429	**.397**	.818	**3.7**	1.7	.8	.2	14.0
2025–26	Phoenix	56	56	30.4	.435	.344	.842	3.6	1.8	1.0	.2	**20.2**
Career		548	521	29.6	.421	.353	.810	3.3	2.0	.9	.2	14.8

==== Playoffs ====
Year	Team	GP	GS	MPG	FG%	3P%	FT%	RPG	APG	SPG	BPG	PPG
2021	Memphis	5	5	35.0	**.515**	.400	.808	4.2	2.2	**1.4**	**.4**	25.8
2022	Memphis	**11**	**11**	30.5	.349	.347	.640	2.7	**2.7**	1.0	.3	14.6
2023	Memphis	6	6	27.9	.312	.238	.714	3.0	1.8	.2	.0	10.5
2025	Houston	7	7	29.4	.444	.345	.833	3.1	1.3	.7	.3	12.3
2026	Phoenix	4	4	**37.3**	.459	**.438**	**1.000***	**6.0**	1.8	.3	.3	**26.0**
Career		33	33	31.3	.407	.344	.787	3.5	2.1	.8	.2	16.5

=== College ===
Year	Team	GP	GS	MPG	FG%	3P%	FT%	RPG	APG	SPG	BPG	PPG
2014–15	Oregon	36	33	28.3	.456	.337	**.825**	4.9	1.8	.5	**.6**	11.5
2015–16	Oregon	**38**	**38**	**32.8**	.470	.338	.806	**5.4**	**3.1**	**1.1**	.4	**16.7**
2016–17	Oregon	35	27	25.3	**.488**	**.401**	.754	3.2	2.7	**1.1**	.5	16.1
Career		109	98	28.9	.472	.362	.794	4.6	2.6	.9	.5	14.8
