= List of 2026–27 NBA season transactions =

This is a list of transactions that have taken place during the 2026 NBA off-season and the 2026–27 NBA season.

== Retirement ==
Date	Name	Team(s) played (years)	Age	Notes	Ref.
July 4	Garrett Temple	Houston Rockets (2010); Sacramento Kings (2010; 2016–2018); San Antonio Spurs (2010); Milwaukee Bucks (2011); Charlotte Hornets (2011); Washington Wizards (2012–2016); Memphis Grizzlies (2018–2019); Los Angeles Clippers (2019); Brooklyn Nets (2019–2020); Chicago Bulls (2020–2021); New Orleans Pelicans (2021–2023); Toronto Raptors (2023–2026)	40	Also played in the D-League and abroad Hired as an assistant coach by the Dallas Mavericks	
July 7	Kyle Lowry	Memphis Grizzlies (2006–2009); Houston Rockets (2009–2012); Toronto Raptors (2012–2021); Miami Heat (2021–2024); Philadelphia 76ers (2024–2026)	40	NBA champion (2019); 6× NBA All-Star (2015–2020); All-NBA Third Team (2016)	
July 23	Brandon Davies	Philadelphia 76ers (2013–2014); Brooklyn Nets (2014–2015)	34	Also played abroad	
July 30	Josh Richardson	Miami Heat (2015–2019; 2023–2025); Philadelphia 76ers (2019–2020); Dallas Mavericks (2020–2021); Boston Celtics (2021–2022); San Antonio Spurs (2022–2023); New Orleans Pelicans (2023)	32	Also played abroad	
August 12	Russell Westbrook	Oklahoma City Thunder (2008–2019); Houston Rockets (2019–2020); Washington Wizards (2020–2021); Los Angeles Lakers (2021–2023); Los Angeles Clippers (2023–2024); Denver Nuggets (2024–2025); Sacramento Kings (2025–2026)	37	NBA Most Valuable Player (2017); 9× NBA All-Star (2011–2013, 2015–2020); All-NBA First Team (2016, 2017); All-NBA Second Team (2011–2013, 2015, 2018); All-NBA Third Team (2019, 2020); NBA scoring champion (2015, 2017); NBA All-Rookie First Team (2009); NBA 75th Anniversary Team; 2× NBA scoring champion (2015, 2017); 3× NBA assists leader (2018, 2019, 2021)	
September 3	Jared Sullinger	Boston Celtics (2012–2016); Toronto Raptors (2016–2017)	34	Also played in the D-League and abroad Hired as an Director of Team and Player Development by the Ohio State Buckeyes.	
September 14	Taj Gibson	Chicago Bulls (2009–2017); Oklahoma City Thunder (2017); Minnesota Timberwolves (2017–2019); New York Knicks (2019–2022; 2023–2024); Washington Wizards (2022–2023); Detroit Pistons (2024); Charlotte Hornets (2024–2025); Memphis Grizzlies (2026)	41	NBA All-Rookie First Team (2010)	
September 21	Nicolas Batum	Portland Trail Blazers (2008–2015); Charlotte Hornets (2015–2020); Los Angeles Clippers (2020–2023; 2024–2026); Philadelphia 76ers (2023–2024)	37	Also played abroad	
September 25	Isaiah Whitehead	Brooklyn Nets (2016–2018)	31	Also played in the NBA G League and abroad	
September 26	Norris Cole	Miami Heat (2011–2015); New Orleans Pelicans (2015–2016); Oklahoma City Thunder (2017)	37	Also played in the NBA G League and abroad Hired as an assistant coach by the Sioux Falls Skyforce	
October 2	Kevin Pangos	Cleveland Cavaliers (2021–2022)	33	Also played abroad	
November 13	Doug McDermott	Chicago Bulls (2014–2017); Oklahoma City Thunder (2017); New York Knicks (2017–2018); Dallas Mavericks (2018); Indiana Pacers (2018–2021; 2024); San Antonio Spurs (2021–2024); Sacramento Kings (2024–2026)	34		

== Front office movements ==
=== Head coaching changes ===
Off-season

Departure date	Team	Outgoing head coach	Reason for departure	Hire date	Incoming head coach	Last coaching position	Ref.
April 13	Milwaukee Bucks	Doc Rivers	Resigned	April 30	Taylor Jenkins	Memphis Grizzlies head coach (2019–2025)	
April 21	Chicago Bulls	Billy Donovan	Stepped down	June 16	Tiago Splitter	Portland Trail Blazers interim head coach (2025–2026)	
May 4	Orlando Magic	Jamahl Mosley	Fired	June 1	Sean Sweeney	San Antonio Spurs associate head coach (2025–2026)	
May 18	New Orleans Pelicans	James Borrego (interim)	Demoted	May 18	Jamahl Mosley	Orlando Magic head coach (2021–2026)	
May 19	Dallas Mavericks	Jason Kidd	Mutually agreed to part ways	June 23	Dusty May	Michigan head coach (2024–2026)	
June 16	Portland Trail Blazers	Tiago Splitter (interim)	Hired by Bulls	June 23	Micah Nori	Minnesota Timberwolves assistant coach (2021–2026)	

=== General manager changes ===
Off-season

Departure date	Team	Outgoing general manager	Reason for departure	Hire date	Incoming general manager	Last managerial position	Ref.
November 11	Dallas Mavericks	Michael Finley (interim); Matt Riccardi (interim)		May 8	Mike Schmitz	Portland Trail Blazers assistant general manager (2022–2026)	

== Player movements ==
=== Trades ===
June
June 23	To Cleveland Cavaliers: 2026 SAC second-round pick (No. 34); 2032 SAC second-round pick	To Sacramento Kings: Draft rights to Alex Karaban (No. 29)	
June 23	To Denver Nuggets: 2026 UTA second-round pick (No. 35); 2028 MIN second-round pick; 2031 SAC second-round pick	To San Antonio Spurs: Draft rights to Tarris Reed (No. 26)	
June 23	To Memphis Grizzlies: Draft rights to Ebuka Okorie (No. 17) (Note: Memphis flipped Okorie's rights to Detroit.); 2030 second-round pick (Note: The most favorable of the picks originally belonging to Denver, Houston, and Miami.); 2033 OKC second-round pick	To Oklahoma City Thunder: Draft rights to Bennett Stirtz (No. 16)	
June 24 (before second round)	To Detroit Pistons: Draft rights to Ebuka Okorie (No. 17)	To Memphis Grizzlies: Draft rights to Karim López (No. 21); 2029 second-round pick (Note: The most favorable of the picks originally belonging to Detroit, Milwaukee, and New York.) (Note: Detroit agreed to trade this pick to Memphis during the first round for the draft rights to Ebuka Okorie and during the second round the next night agreed to send it back to Detroit for Isaiah Stewart in a trade not yet made official.); 2031 DAL second-round pick; 2032 DET second-round pick	
June 24 (before second round)	Four-team trade		(Note: Because this trade was official before the second round began, picks were traded rather than any players' draft rights.)
June 24 (before second round)	To Dallas Mavericks: Draft rights to Sergio de Larrea (No. 25) (from Los Angeles)	To Los Angeles Lakers: Draft rights to Cameron Carr (No. 24) (from New York)	(Note: Because this trade was official before the second round began, picks were traded rather than any players' draft rights.)
June 24 (before second round)	To New York Knicks: Draft rights to Melvin Ajinça (2024 No. 51) (from Dallas); Draft rights to Chinemelu Elonu (2009 No. 59) (from Los Angeles); Draft rights to Louis Labeyrie (2014 No. 57) (from Los Angeles); 2026 PHI second-round pick (No. 47) (from Phoenix); 2029 PHX second-round pick (from Phoenix); 2030 PHI second-round pick (from Dallas); 2032 DAL second-round pick (from Dallas); 2033 PHX second-round pick (from Phoenix); Cash considerations (from Los Angeles); Cash considerations (from Phoenix)	To Phoenix Suns: Draft rights to Koa Peat (No. 30) (from Dallas)	(Note: Because this trade was official before the second round began, picks were traded rather than any players' draft rights.)
June 24 (draft night)	To Atlanta Hawks: Draft rights to Henri Veesaar (No. 52)	To Los Angeles Clippers: Draft rights to Narcisse Ngoy (No. 57); Cash considerations	
June 24 (draft night)	To Chicago Bulls: Kam Jones; 2028 second-round pick swap right (Note: Chicago may trade its own pick for either one of the picks originally belonging to Indiana and Phoenix.); 2030 second-round pick swap right (Note: Chicago may trade its own pick for Indiana's own pick.); Cash considerations	To Indiana Pacers: Draft rights to Braden Smith (No. 38)	
June 24 (draft night)	To Chicago Bulls: Cash considerations	To Los Angeles Lakers: Draft rights to Vsevolod Ishchenko (No. 56) (Note: Los Angeles flipped the rights to Dallas.)	
June 24 (draft night)	To Dallas Mavericks: Draft rights to Vsevolod Ishchenko (No. 56)	To Los Angeles Lakers: Cash considerations	
June 24 (draft night)	To Detroit Pistons: Draft rights to Ugonna Onyenso (No. 53)	To New York Knicks: Cash considerations	
June 24 (draft night)	To Houston Rockets: Cash considerations	To Los Angeles Clippers: Draft rights to Nick Martinelli (No. 55)	
June 24 (draft night)	To Houston Rockets: Draft rights to Bruce Thornton (No. 31); Draft rights to Nick Martinelli (No. 55) (Note: Houston flipped his rights to the Los Angeles Clippers for cash considerations.)	To New York Knicks: Draft rights to Jack Kayil (No. 39); Draft rights to Ugonna Onyenso (No. 53); Draft rights to Mojave King (2023 No. 47); 2029 SAC second-round pick	
June 24 (draft night)	To Miami Heat: Draft rights to Ryan Conwell (No. 37)	To Oklahoma City Thunder: Draft rights to Otega Oweh (No. 41); Cash considerations	
June 24 (draft night)	Three-team trade		
June 24 (draft night)	To Milwaukee Bucks: Draft rights to Malique Lewis (No. 60) (from Washington)	To Orlando Magic: Draft rights to Izaiyah Nelson (No. 51) (from Washington); Cash considerations (from Milwaukee)	
June 24 (draft night)	To Washington Wizards: Draft rights to Felix Okpara (No. 46) (from Orlando)		
June 29	To Memphis Grizzlies: Jerami Grant; Kris Murray	To Portland Trail Blazers: Ja Morant; Cash considerations	
June 30	To Atlanta Hawks: Devin Carter; 2033 SAC second-round pick	To Sacramento Kings: Draft rights to Alpha Kaba (2017 No. 60)	
July
July 6	To Atlanta Hawks: Aaron Wiggins	To Oklahoma City Thunder: 2030 ATL second-round pick; 2032 second-round pick (Note: The less favorable of the picks originally belonging to Atlanta and the Los Angeles Lakers.)	
July 6	To Boston Celtics: Paul George; 2028 first-round pick (Note: Philadelphia owes its own pick to Brooklyn if its falls No. 9–30, and owns the Los Angeles Clippers pick outright. San Antonio has the right to swap its own pick with Boston if Boston's pick falls No. 2–30. Boston may swap for the most favorable (or only) pick Philadelphia holds unless the Philadelphia pick falls No. 9–30 AND the Clippers pick falls No. 17–30, in which case Boston would receive the Clippers pick outright and make no swap with Philadelphia.); 2028 second-round pick (Note: The most favorable of the picks originally belonging to Golden State, Milwaukee, and Oklahoma City.); 2030 second-round pick (Note: The most favorable of the picks originally belonging to Phoenix, Portland, and Washington.); 2031 PHI first-round pick	To Philadelphia 76ers: Jaylen Brown	
July 6	To Detroit Pistons: Isaiah Joe	To Oklahoma City Thunder: 2030 MIN second-round pick; 2031 DET second-round pick	
July 6	To Miami Heat: Giannis Antetokounmpo; Bobby Portis	To Milwaukee Bucks: Tyler Herro; Kasparas Jakučionis; Jaime Jaquez Jr.; Kel'el Ware; Draft rights to Nate Ament (No. 13); 2030 first-round pick swap right (Note: Milwaukee may swap their own pick for Miami's own pick.); 2031 MIA first-round pick; 2033 MIA first-round pick; 2033 MIA second-round pick	
July 6	To Charlotte Hornets: Dorian Finney-Smith; 2027 MEM second-round pick; 2028 HOU second-round pick; 2033 HOU second-round pick	To Houston Rockets: Cash considerations	
July 7	To Los Angeles Lakers: Jaden Hardy; 2031 second-round pick; 2032 second-round pick	To Washington Wizards: Deandre Ayton	
July 8	To Los Angeles Lakers: Walker Kessler (sign-and-trade)	To Utah Jazz: 2028 first-round pick swap right; 2030 first-round pick swap right; 2031 LAL first-round pick; 2033 LAL first-round pick	
July 8	Six-team trade		
July 8	To Dallas Mavericks: Santi Aldama (from Memphis); Marcus Sasser (from Detroit); Draft rights to Tarik Biberović (2023 No. 56) (from Memphis)	To Detroit Pistons: John Collins (sign-and-trade) (from Los Angeles); Gary Harris (from Milwaukee); Taurean Prince (from Milwaukee); 2029 second-round pick (from Memphis); 2031 DAL second-round pick (from Memphis); 2032 DET second-round pick (from Memphis)	
July 8	To Los Angeles Clippers: 2028 protected second-round pick (Note: Los Angeles will receive the pick if falls No. 56–60.) (from Detroit)	To Memphis Grizzlies: AJ Johnson (from Dallas); D'Angelo Russell (from Washington); Isaiah Stewart (from Detroit); 2029 HOU second-round pick (from Dallas); 2029 LAL second-round pick (from Washington); 2030 GSW protected first-round pick (Note: Memphis will receive the pick if falls No. 21–30; if it falls No. 1–20, Memphis will receive Golden State's own 2030 second-round pick.) (from Dallas); 2032 second-round pick swap right (Note: Memphis may swap the more favorable of their own pick and the pick originally belonging to Philadelphia for the pick originally belonging to Utah.) (from Washington); 2033 WAS second-round pick (from Washington)	
July 8	To Milwaukee Bucks: Caris LeVert (from Detroit); 2027 MIL second-round pick (Note: Milwaukee traded this pick away in a previous transaction.) (from Detroit); 2027 second-round pick (Note: The less favorable of the picks originally belonging to Brooklyn and Dallas.) (from Detroit); Cash considerations (from Los Angeles)	To Washington Wizards: Khris Middleton (sign-and-trade) (from Dallas); 2033 DAL second-round pick (from Dallas)	
July 10	Four-team trade		
July 10	To Brooklyn Nets: Julius Randle (from Minnesota); Draft rights to Joshua Jefferson (No. 28) (from Minnesota)	To Charlotte Hornets: Mouhamadou Gueye (from Chicago); Naz Reid (from Minnesota); Draft rights to Matteo Spagnolo (2022 No. 50) (from Minnesota); 2028 first-round pick swap right (Note: Charlotte may swap its own pick for Minnesota's own pick.) (from Minnesota); 2029 first-round pick swap right (Note: Charlotte may swap its own pick for Minnesota's pick if it falls No. 1–5.) (from Minnesota); 2029 MIN second-round pick (from Minnesota); 2030 first-round pick swap right (Note: Through earlier trades, Minnesota will retain its own pick or receive the pick originally belonging to Dallas and San Antonio, if Minnesota's pick falls No. 2–30; Charlotte may swap its own pick for whichever pick Minnesota has afterward.) (from Minnesota); 2032 MIN second-round pick (from Minnesota); 2033 MIN first-round pick (from Minnesota); 2033 MIN second-round pick (from Minnesota)	
July 10	To Chicago Bulls: Nic Claxton (from Brooklyn)	To Minnesota Timberwolves: LaMelo Ball (from Charlotte); Josh Green (from Charlotte); Draft rights to Isaiah Evans (No. 33) (from Brooklyn)	
July 13	To Charlotte Hornets: Grayson Allen; Royce O'Neale; 2033 PHX first-round pick	To Phoenix Suns: Miles Bridges; 2027 second-round pick (Note: The less favorable of the picks originally belonging to Boston and Orlando.); 2029 protected first-round pick (Note: The least favorable of the picks originally belonging to Charlotte, Cleveland, Minnesota, and Utah; the Minnesota pick is only conveyable if No. 6–30.)	
July 19	Three-team trade		
July 19	To Atlanta Hawks: Luguentz Dort (from Oklahoma City); Ryan Nembhard (from Dallas)	To Dallas Mavericks: Zaccharie Risacher (from Atlanta); Protected second-round pick (Note: Dallas will receive the pick if it falls No. 56–60. The year and original owner of the pick haven't been announced.) (from Atlanta)	
July 19	To Oklahoma City Thunder: 2027 CHI second-round pick (from Dallas); 2031 second-round pick (Note: The most favorable of the picks originally belonging to Atlanta and Houston (if No. 31–55).) (from Atlanta); 2032 second-round pick (Note: The most favorable of the picks originally belonging to Atlanta and the Los Angeles Lakers.) (from Atlanta)		
July 28	To Los Angeles Clippers: Johni Broome; 2027 second-round pick (Note: Los Angeles will receive the second most favorable pick out of three possibilities: 1) the most favorable of the picks originally belonging to Houston, Indiana, Miami, and Oklahoma City; 2) the more favorable of the picks originally belonging to Golden State and Phoenix; 3) Philadelphia's own pick.)	To Philadelphia 76ers: Cash considerations	
August
August 20
August 20	Five-team trade		
August 20	To Charlotte Hornets: Dennis Schröder (from Cleveland); Cash considerations (from Cleveland)	To Cleveland Cavaliers: Peyton Watson (sign-and-trade) (from Denver); Cam Whitmore (from Washington); Draft rights to Ismaël Kamagate (2022 No. 46) (from Los Angeles)	
August 20	To Denver Nuggets: Julian Reese (two-way contract) (from Washington); 2031 CLE first-round pick (from Cleveland); 2032 SAC second-round pick (from Cleveland)	To Los Angeles Clippers: Max Strus (from Cleveland)	
August 20	To Washington Wizards: Tre Mann (from Charlotte); 2027 second-round pick (from Los Angeles); Cash considerations (from Cleveland)		
August 29	To Minnesota Timberwolves: John Konchar; Cody Williams	To Utah Jazz: Josh Green; Cash considerations	
September
September 8	To Memphis Grizzlies: Jordan Hawkins; Micah Peavy; 2031 TOR second-round pick; 2032 second-round pick swap right (Note: Memphis already owned the most favorable of the picks originally belonging to Memphis, Philadelphia, and Utah through previous trades; this trade gives them the right to trade the pick they own for New Orleans' own pick.)	To New Orleans Pelicans: Taj Gibson; AJ Johnson	
September 14	To Los Angeles Clippers: Gradey Dick; Brandon Ingram; 2027 TOR first-round pick swap right (Note: Oklahoma City has the right to swap picks with Los Angeles, after which the Clippers can swap with Toronto.); 2030 TOR second-round pick; 2031 TOR first-round pick; 2033 TOR first-round pick; 2033 TOR second-round pick	To Toronto Raptors: Kawhi Leonard	
September 22	To Atlanta Hawks: Dorian Finney-Smith	To Charlotte Hornets: Buddy Hield; Ryan Nembhard; Cash considerations	
September 27	To Charlotte Hornets: Rob Dillingham	To Chicago Bulls: Buddy Hield; Cash considerations	
November
November 8	To Oklahoma City Thunder: Nique Clifford	To Sacramento Kings: 2028 UTA second-round pick; 2030 MIN second-round pick	

=== Free agents ===
The NBA's free agency period began on June 30 at 6 p.m. EST.

Players were allowed to sign new offers starting on July 6 at 12 p.m. ET, after the moratorium ended.

^{R}	Denotes unsigned players whose free-agent rights were renounced
^{T}	Denotes sign-and-trade players
^{C}	Denotes player who is claimed off waivers (same contract, different team)
	Denotes signed player who failed to make opening-day roster
	Denotes player whose deal was later turned into a two-way contract
	Denotes player signed to 10-day contract
	Denotes restricted free agent whose offer sheet was matched by his old team

Player	Date signed	New team	Former team	Ref
Branden Carlson	July 1	Portland Trail Blazers	Oklahoma City Thunder (Previously on a two-way contract)	
Jevon Carter	July 1	Orlando Magic		
Jonathan Isaac	July 1	Orlando Magic (Waived on June 27)		
Nikola Vučević	July 1	Orlando Magic	Boston Celtics	
Simone Fontecchio	July 2	Miami Heat		
Alijah Martin (RFA)	July 2	Toronto Raptors (Previously on a two-way contract)		
Daeqwon Plowden (RFA)	July 2	Sacramento Kings (Previously on a two-way contract)		
Bones Hyland	July 3	Minnesota Timberwolves		
Jose Alvarado*	July 6	New York Knicks		
Kyle Anderson	July 6	Toronto Raptors	Minnesota Timberwolves	
Mike Conley	July 6	Boston Celtics	Minnesota Timberwolves	
Mohamed Diawara (RFA)	July 6	New York Knicks		
Andre Drummond	July 6	New York Knicks	Philadelphia 76ers	
Keon Ellis	July 6	Brooklyn Nets	Cleveland Cavaliers	
Rui Hachimura	July 6	Los Angeles Clippers	Los Angeles Lakers	
Tim Hardaway Jr.	July 6	Miami Heat	Denver Nuggets	
Ron Harper Jr.**	July 6	Boston Celtics		
Tobias Harris	July 6	San Antonio Spurs	Detroit Pistons	
Isaiah Hartenstein**	July 6	Oklahoma City Thunder		
Al Horford*	July 6	Golden State Warriors		
Ariel Hukporti	July 6	Philadelphia 76ers	New York Knicks	
Josh Minott**	July 6	Brooklyn Nets		
Mitchell Robinson	July 6	Boston Celtics	New York Knicks	
Landry Shamet	July 6	New York Knicks		
Day'Ron Sharpe**	July 6	Brooklyn Nets		
Anfernee Simons	July 6	Philadelphia 76ers	Chicago Bulls	
Dean Wade	July 6	Philadelphia 76ers	Cleveland Cavaliers	
Coby White	July 6	Charlotte Hornets		
Kenrich Williams**	July 6	Oklahoma City Thunder		
Trae Young*	July 6	Washington Wizards		
Precious Achiuwa	July 7	Sacramento Kings		
Thomas Bryant	July 7	Cleveland Cavaliers		
Collin Gillespie	July 7	Phoenix Suns		
Jordan Goodwin	July 7	Phoenix Suns		
Quentin Grimes	July 7	Los Angeles Lakers	Philadelphia 76ers	
Kyle Lowry	July 7	Toronto Raptors (ceremonial retirement)	Philadelphia 76ers	
Sandro Mamukelashvili*	July 7	Los Angeles Lakers	Toronto Raptors	
Duke Miles	July 7	Philadelphia 76ers	Vanderbilt Commodores (Undrafted in 2026)	
Kelly Oubre Jr.	July 7	Indiana Pacers	Philadelphia 76ers	
Kobe Sanders** (RFA)	July 7	Los Angeles Clippers		
Mark Williams (RFA)	July 7	Phoenix Suns		
Harrison Barnes	July 8	San Antonio Spurs		
Bogdan Bogdanović**	July 8	Houston Rockets	Los Angeles Clippers	
John Collins ^{T}	July 8	Detroit Pistons	Los Angeles Clippers	
Javonte Green	July 8	Detroit Pistons		
Walker Kessler ^{T} (RFA)	July 8	Los Angeles Lakers	Utah Jazz	
Khris Middleton ^{T}	July 8	Washington Wizards	Dallas Mavericks	
Quinten Post (RFA)	July 8	Memphis Grizzlies	Golden State Warriors	
Charles Bassey	July 9	Golden State Warriors		
Nate Bittle	July 9	Toronto Raptors	Oregon Ducks (Undrafted in 2026)	
Ousmane Dieng	July 9	Milwaukee Bucks		
Tari Eason (RFA)	July 9	Houston Rockets		
Jaxson Hayes	July 9	Utah Jazz	Los Angeles Lakers	
Kevin Huerter	July 9	Detroit Pistons		
Jordan Miller** (RFA)	July 9	Los Angeles Clippers		
Larry Nance Jr.	July 9	Indiana Pacers	Cleveland Cavaliers	
Pete Nance	July 9	Milwaukee Bucks (Waived on July 3)		
Jusuf Nurkić	July 9	Utah Jazz		
Josh Okogie	July 9	Utah Jazz	Houston Rockets	
Mo Bamba	July 10	Utah Jazz (Waived on March 12)		
Jaylen Clark (RFA)	July 10	Minnesota Timberwolves		
Jordan Clarkson	July 10	New York Knicks		
Ayo Dosunmu	July 10	Minnesota Timberwolves		
Jock Landale	July 10	Atlanta Hawks		
Micah Potter ^{C}	July 10	Portland Trail Blazers	Indiana Pacers (Waived on July 8)	
Norman Powell	July 10	Chicago Bulls	Miami Heat	
Marcus Smart*	July 10	Houston Rockets	Los Angeles Lakers	
DeAndre Jordan	July 11	New Orleans Pelicans		
Trey Lyles	July 11	Minnesota Timberwolves	Real Madrid (Spain)	
Austin Reaves*	July 12	Los Angeles Lakers		
Collin Sexton	July 12	Los Angeles Lakers	Chicago Bulls	
Kevon Looney**	July 13	Los Angeles Lakers	New Orleans Pelicans	
Jordan McLaughlin	July 13	San Antonio Spurs		
Tucker DeVries	July 14	Boston Celtics	Indiana Hoosiers (Undrafted in 2026)	
Tyus Jones	July 14	Denver Nuggets		
Luke Kennard	July 14	Phoenix Suns	Los Angeles Lakers	
Milos Uzan	July 14	Boston Celtics	Houston Cougars (Undrafted in 2026)	
Gary Trent Jr.*	July 16	Milwaukee Bucks		
Ziaire Williams**	July 19	Los Angeles Lakers	Brooklyn Nets	
Moussa Cissé (RFA)	July 22	Dallas Mavericks (Previously on a two-way contract)		
Isaiah Crawford (RFA)	July 22	Houston Rockets (Previously on a two-way contract)		
Jae'Sean Tate	July 23	Houston Rockets		
Julian Phillips**	July 24	Houston Rockets	Minnesota Timberwolves	
Oscar Tshiebwe	July 24	Houston Rockets	Utah Jazz (Previously on a two-way contract)	
Kobe Bufkin	July 25	New Orleans Pelicans	Los Angeles Lakers	
Harrison Ingram	July 25	Utah Jazz	San Antonio Spurs (Previously on a two-way contract)	
LeBron James	July 27	Philadelphia 76ers	Los Angeles Lakers	
Matisse Thybulle	July 27	Los Angeles Lakers	Portland Trail Blazers	
Christian Koloko	July 28	New Orleans Pelicans	Atlanta Hawks (Previously on a two-way contract)	
Draymond Green*	July 30	Golden State Warriors		
Mario Hezonja	July 31	Cleveland Cavaliers	Real Madrid (Spain)	
Moritz Wagner	July 31	Brooklyn Nets	Orlando Magic	
De'Anthony Melton*	August 1	Golden State Warriors		
Gary Payton II	August 1	Golden State Warriors		
Jeremy Sochan	August 2	Portland Trail Blazers	New York Knicks	
Marvin Bagley III	August 4	Denver Nuggets	Dallas Mavericks	
Alpha Diallo	August 4	Denver Nuggets	AS Monaco (Monaco)	
Caleb Houstan	August 4	New Orleans Pelicans	Atlanta Hawks (Previously on a two-way contract)	
Spencer Jones (RFA)	August 4	Denver Nuggets		
Kentavious Caldwell-Pope	August 5	Philadelphia 76ers	Memphis Grizzlies (Waived on July 26)	
Andre Jackson Jr.**	August 5	Toronto Raptors	Milwaukee Bucks	
Taelon Peter	August 7	San Antonio Spurs	Indiana Pacers (Waived on July 20; previously on a two-way contract)	
Yuki Kawamura	August 8	Los Angeles Clippers	Chicago Bulls (Previously on a two-way contract)	
Bradley Beal*	August 13	Los Angeles Clippers		
Haywood Highsmith	August 17	Phoenix Suns (Previously waived on August 12)		
Malachi Smith	August 17	Toronto Raptors	Brooklyn Nets	
Trendon Watford**	August 17	New Orleans Pelicans	Philadelphia 76ers	
Peyton Watson ^{T} (RFA)	August 20	Cleveland Cavaliers	Denver Nuggets	
Klay Thompson	August 23	Miami Heat	Dallas Mavericks (Waived on August 21)	
Georges Niang	August 25	Golden State Warriors	Memphis Grizzlies (Waived on February 5)	
Brandon Williams	August 26	Golden State Warriors	Dallas Mavericks	
J'Vonne Hadley	August 27	Miami Heat	Louisville Cardinals (Undrafted in 2026)	
Nick Richards	August 27	Miami Heat	Chicago Bulls	
Dalen Terry	August 27	Golden State Warriors	Philadelphia 76ers (Waived on July 26)	
Josiah Allick	August 31	Charlotte Hornets	Greensboro Swarm (NBA G League)	
Matthew Murrell	August 31	Utah Jazz	Salt Lake City Stars (NBA G League)	
Tacko Fall	September 1	Philadelphia 76ers	Ningbo Rockets (China)	
Jameer Nelson Jr.	September 1	Philadelphia 76ers	Osos de Manatí (Puerto Rico)	
Saint Thomas	September 1	Philadelphia 76ers	Delaware Blue Coats (NBA G League)	
Trey Townsend	September 1	Charlotte Hornets	Saskatoon Mamba (Canada)	
Khalifa Diop	September 2	Cleveland Cavaliers	Saski Baskonia (Spain)	
Kyle Mangas	September 2	Charlotte Hornets	Austin Spurs (NBA G League)	
Malaki Branham	September 3	Orlando Magic	Houston Rockets (Waived on August 5)	
JD Davison	September 3	Orlando Magic	Cleveland Charge (NBA G League)	
Jarkel Joiner	September 3	Charlotte Hornets	Vancouver Bandits (Canada)	
Jonathan Kuminga**	September 3	Minnesota Timberwolves	Atlanta Hawks	
John Butler Jr.	September 4	Milwaukee Bucks	Wisconsin Herd (NBA G League)	
Kobe Stewart	September 4	Charlotte Hornets	Wisconsin Herd (NBA G League)	
DeMar DeRozan	September 8	Denver Nuggets	Sacramento Kings (Waived on July 6)	
James Harden*	September 8	Cleveland Cavaliers		
Devon Higgs	September 8	Atlanta Hawks	College Park Skyhawks (NBA G League)	
Dillon Jones	September 8	Philadelphia 76ers	New York Knicks (Previously on a two-way contract)	
Bez Mbeng**	September 8	Charlotte Hornets	Utah Jazz	
Ben Simmons	September 8	Sacramento Kings	Los Angeles Clippers	
Keyshawn Bryant	September 9	Atlanta Hawks	Windy City Bulls (NBA G League)	
Lamont Butler	September 10	Atlanta Hawks	Kentucky Wildcats (Undrafted in 2025)	
Bennedict Mathurin	September 10	New Orleans Pelicans	Los Angeles Clippers	
Anthony Gill	September 15	Washington Wizards		
Ochai Agbaji	September 16	New York Knicks	Brooklyn Nets	
Bruce Brown	September 16	New York Knicks	Denver Nuggets	
Drew Eubanks	September 16	New York Knicks	Sacramento Kings	
John Konchar	September 16	New York Knicks	Minnesota Timberwolves (Waived on August 29)	
KeShawn Murphy	September 18	Washington Wizards	Auburn Tigers (Undrafted in 2026)	
Jaden Bradley	September 21	Toronto Raptors (Previously on a two-way contract)		
Bez Mbeng ^{C}	September 22	Miami Heat	Charlotte Hornets (Waived on September 20)	
Curtis Jones	September 24	Cleveland Cavaliers	Denver Nuggets (Previously on a two-way contract)	
Brendan Hausen	September 25	Memphis Grizzlies	Iowa Hawkeyes (Undrafted in 2026)	
Dwight Powell	September 25	Dallas Mavericks		
Peter Suder	September 25	Chicago Bulls	Los Angeles Lakers (Waived on July 21; previously on a two-way contract)	
Jarkel Joiner	September 26	Charlotte Hornets (Previously waived on September 4)		
Devin Carter	September 27	Boston Celtics	Atlanta Hawks (Waived on September 11)	
Hayden Gray**	September 27	Boston Celtics	Utah Jazz	
Trevor Keels	September 27	Washington Wizards	Miami Heat (Previously on a two-way contract)	
Chris Livingston	September 27	Washington Wizards	Cleveland Cavaliers (Waived on January 28; previously on a two-way contract)	
Kenyon Martin Jr.	September 27	Minnesota Timberwolves	Ningbo Rockets (China)	
Emanuel Miller	September 27	Denver Nuggets	San Antonio Spurs (Waived on July 22; previously on a two-way contract)	
Norchad Omier	September 27	Minnesota Timberwolves	Los Angeles Clippers (Previously on a two-way contract)	
Antonio Reeves	September 27	Minnesota Timberwolves	Charlotte Hornets (Previously on a two-way contract)	
Drew Timme	September 27	Minnesota Timberwolves	Los Angeles Lakers (Previously on a two-way contract)	
Leaky Black	September 28	Sacramento Kings	Washington Wizards (Waived on July 1; previously on a two-way contract)	
Tristen Newton	September 28	Sacramento Kings	Houston Rockets (Waived on August 26; previously on a two-way contract)	
Blake Wesley	September 28	Los Angeles Clippers	Portland Trail Blazers	
Tony Bradley	September 30	New York Knicks	Atlanta Hawks	
Isaiah Stevens	October 1	Chicago Bulls	Sacramento Kings (Waived on July 27; previously on a two-way contract)	
Jalen Duren (RFA)	October 3	Detroit Pistons		
Tony Bradley ^{C}	October 17	Utah Jazz	New York Knicks (Waived on October 15)	
Blake Wesley	October 29	Los Angeles Clippers (10-day contract, previously waived on October 17)		
Dalen Terry	November 4	Oklahoma City Thunder	Golden State Warriors (Waived on October 17)	
Mason Plumlee	November 11	Sacramento Kings	San Antonio Spurs	
Orlando Robinson	November 13	Chicago Bulls	Windy City Bulls (NBA G League)	
Bismack Biyombo			San Antonio Spurs	
Pat Connaughton			Charlotte Hornets (Waived on October 16)	
Seth Curry			Golden State Warriors	
Jeff Green			Houston Rockets	
Maxi Kleber ^{R}			Los Angeles Lakers	
Kevin Love			Utah Jazz	
Gabe Vincent			Atlanta Hawks	

* Player option
** Team option
*** Early termination option

=== Two-way contracts ===
Per recent NBA rules implemented as of the 2026–27 season, teams are permitted to have three two-way players on their roster at any given time, in addition to their 15-man regular season roster. A two-way player will provide services primarily to the team's G League affiliate, but can spend up to 50 days with the parent NBA team. Only players with four or fewer years of NBA experience are able to sign two-way contracts, which can be for either one season or two. Players entering training camp for a team have a chance to convert their training camp deal into a two-way contract if they prove themselves worthy enough for it. Teams also have the option to convert a two-way contract into a regular, minimum-salary NBA contract, at which point the player becomes a regular member of the parent NBA team. Two-way players are not eligible for NBA playoff rosters, so a team must convert any two-way players it wants to use in the playoffs, while waiving another player in the process.

	Denotes players who were promoted to the main roster
	Denotes players who were cut before season's end
	Denotes players who were traded away before season's end
^{C}	Denotes players who are claimed off waivers (same contract, different team)
^{T}	Denotes players acquired in a trade

Player	Date signed	Team	School / Club team	Ref
Chucky Hepburn (RFA)	June 25	Toronto Raptors (Previously on a two-way contract)		
Chaney Johnson (RFA)	June 29	Brooklyn Nets (Previously on a two-way contract)		
Colin Castleton	July 1	Orlando Magic (Previously on a two-way contract)		
Adam Flagler	July 1	Sacramento Kings	Austin Spurs (NBA G League)	
Izaiyah Nelson	July 1	Orlando Magic	South Florida Bulls	
Ernest Udeh Jr.	July 1	Cleveland Cavaliers	Miami Hurricanes (Undrafted in 2026)	
Jamir Watkins	July 1	Washington Wizards		
Tyler Bilodeau	July 2	Brooklyn Nets	UCLA Bruins	
Enrique Freeman	July 2	Minnesota Timberwolves (Previously on a two-way contract)		
Jonathan Mogbo	July 2	Sacramento Kings	Toronto Raptors	
Amari Williams	July 2	Boston Celtics		
Tobe Awaka	July 3	Chicago Bulls	Arizona Wildcats (Undrafted in 2026)	
Brooks Barnhizer	July 3	Oklahoma City Thunder (Previously on a two-way contract)		
Tamar Bates	July 3	Utah Jazz (Previously on a two-way contract)		
Maliq Brown	July 3	San Antonio Spurs	Duke Blue Devils	
Josh Dix	July 3	Oklahoma City Thunder	Creighton Bluejays (Undrafted in 2026)	
Tre Donaldson	July 3	Miami Heat	Miami Hurricanes (Undrafted in 2026)	
Ja'Kobi Gillespie	July 3	San Antonio Spurs	Tennessee Volunteers	
Chris Mañon (RFA)	July 3	Los Angeles Lakers (Previously on a two-way contract)		
AK Okereke	July 3	Los Angeles Lakers	Vanderbilt Commodores (Undrafted in 2026)	
Otega Oweh	July 3	Oklahoma City Thunder	Kentucky Wildcats	
Jaylin Sellers	July 3	Chicago Bulls	Providence Friars (Undrafted in 2026)	
Peter Suder	July 3	Los Angeles Lakers	Miami RedHawks (Undrafted in 2026)	
Jaden Bradley	July 4	Toronto Raptors	Arizona Wildcats	
Pat Spencer	July 4	Phoenix Suns	Golden State Warriors	
Kam Jones	July 5	Milwaukee Bucks	Indiana Pacers	
Caleb Love	July 5	Philadelphia 76ers	Portland Trail Blazers (Previously on a two-way contract)	
Nick Martinelli	July 5	Los Angeles Clippers	Northwestern Wildcats	
Michael Ajayi	July 6	Charlotte Hornets	Butler Bulldogs (Undrafted in 2026)	
Kylan Boswell	July 6	Charlotte Hornets	Illinois Fighting Illini (Undrafted in 2026)	
Koby Brea	July 6	Phoenix Suns (Previously on a two-way contract)		
Tobi Lawal	July 6	Dallas Mavericks	Virginia Tech Hokies	
Ugonna Onyenso	July 6	Detroit Pistons	Virginia Cavaliers	
Trey Alexander	July 7	Utah Jazz	New Orleans Pelicans (Previously on a two-way contract)	
Hunter Dickinson	July 7	New Orleans Pelicans (Previously on a two-way contract)		
Felix Okpara	July 7	Washington Wizards	Tennessee Volunteers	
Quadir Copeland	July 8	Houston Rockets	NC State Wolfpack (Undrafted in 2026)	
Elijah Harkless	July 8	Detroit Pistons	Utah Jazz (Previously on a two-way contract)	
Rayan Rupert	July 8	Philadelphia 76ers	Memphis Grizzlies (Previously on a two-way contract)	
Kobe Brown	July 9	Indiana Pacers		
Vladislav Goldin (RFA)	July 16	Miami Heat (Previously on a two-way contract)		
Jett Howard	July 20	Dallas Mavericks	Orlando Magic	
Arthur Kaluma	July 21	Los Angeles Lakers	South Bay Lakers (NBA G League)	
David Jones García (RFA)	July 22	San Antonio Spurs (Previously on a two-way contract)		
Jalen Slawson (RFA)	July 22	Indiana Pacers (Previously on a two-way contract)		
Jalen Wilson	July 22	Atlanta Hawks	Brooklyn Nets	
Jaron Pierre Jr.	July 24	New Orleans Pelicans	SMU Mustangs	
John Tonje	July 25	Portland Trail Blazers	Boston Celtics (Previously on a two-way contract)	
Trey Jemison	August 4	Toronto Raptors	New York Knicks (Previously on a two-way contract)	
Dillon Mitchell	August 5	Boston Celtics	St. John's Red Storm	
Jamarion Sharp*	August 6	Los Angeles Clippers	Vaqueros de Bayamón (Puerto Rico)	
Jalen Pickett	August 12	Los Angeles Clippers	Denver Nuggets (Previously on a two-way contract)	
Sean Pedulla	August 17	Houston Rockets	Los Angeles Clippers (Waived on August 6; previously on a two-way contract)	
Braden Smith	August 17	Indiana Pacers	Purdue Boilermakers	
Malik Dia	August 18	New Orleans Pelicans	Ole Miss Rebels (Undrafted in 2026)	
Rafael Castro	August 26	Houston Rockets	George Washington Revolutionaries (Undrafted in 2026)	
Bryce Hopkins	August 26	Denver Nuggets	St. John's Red Storm	
Keshad Johnson	August 27	Miami Heat		
Grant Nelson	September 4	Brooklyn Nets		
Cam Whitmore	September 18	Denver Nuggets	Cleveland Cavaliers (Waived on August 28)	
Graham Ike	September 21	Golden State Warriors	Gonzaga Bulldogs (Undrafted in 2026)	
Malachi Smith	September 21	Toronto Raptors	Brooklyn Nets (Waived on July 10)	
Julian Reese	September 24	New Orleans Pelicans	Denver Nuggets (Waived on August 28)	
Kevin McCullar Jr.	September 26	New York Knicks (Previously on a two-way contract)		
Tyler Nickel	September 26	New York Knicks	Vanderbilt Commodores	
Carson Cooper	September 28	Memphis Grizzlies	Michigan State Spartans (Undrafted in 2026)	
Jaden Akins	September 30	New York Knicks	Motor City Cruise (NBA G League)	
Ryan Nembhard	September 30	Denver Nuggets	Dallas Mavericks	
Jordan Hawkins	October 6	Chicago Bulls	Memphis Grizzlies (Waived on October 2)	
Leaky Black	October 15	Sacramento Kings (Converted from Exhibit 10 contract)		
Tacko Fall	October 16	Philadelphia 76ers (Converted from Exhibit 10 contract)		
Reece Beekman	October 17	Washington Wizards (Converted from Exhibit 10 contract)		
Devin Carter	October 17	Boston Celtics (Converted from Exhibit 10 contract)		
Cam Christie	October 17	Los Angeles Clippers (Waived on October 14)		
Harrison Ingram	October 17	Utah Jazz (Converted from Exhibit 10 contract)		
Nate Bittle	October 17	Toronto Raptors (Converted from Exhibit 10 contract)		
Pete Nance	October 19	Milwaukee Bucks (Waived on October 17)		
Julian Phillips	October 19	Houston Rockets (Converted from training camp contract)		
Duop Reath	October 19	Phoenix Suns (Converted from Exhibit 10 contract)		
Oscar Tshiebwe	October 19	Houston Rockets (Converted from Exhibit 10 contract)		
Drew Timme^{C}	October 19	Phoenix Suns (Converted from Exhibit 10 contract)	Minnesota Timberwolves (Waived on October 17)	
Walter Clayton Jr.	October 21	Dallas Mavericks	Memphis Grizzlies (Waived on October 19)	
Dalton Knecht	October 23	New York Knicks	Los Angeles Lakers (Waived on October 19)	
Sean Pedulla	October 23	Sacramento Kings	Houston Rockets (Waived on October 19)	
Kobe Bufkin	October 24	Utah Jazz	New Orleans Pelicans (Waived on October 17)	
Micah Peavy	October 24	Oklahoma City Thunder	Memphis Grizzlies (Waived on October 19)	
Enrique Freeman	October 28	Minnesota Timberwolves (Waived on October 17; previously on a two-way contract)		
Lawson Lovering	October 28	Los Angeles Lakers	Memphis Grizzlies (Waived on September 28)	
Kevin McCullar Jr.	November 5	Toronto Raptors	New York Knicks (Waived on October 23)	
Norchad Omier	November 6	Cleveland Cavaliers	Memphis Grizzlies (Waived on November 7)	
Riley Minix	November 7	Cleveland Cavaliers (Previously waived on November 6)		
Richie Saunders	November 7	Memphis Grizzlies	BYU Cougars	
Carson Cooper	November 10	Los Angeles Lakers	Memphis Grizzlies (Waived on November 7)	
Johni Broome	November 13	Minnesota Timberwolves	Wisconsin Herd (NBA G League)	
Rafael Castro	November 16	Atlanta Hawks	Mexico City Capitanes (NBA G League)	
Jonas Aidoo	November 17	Utah Jazz	Salt Lake City Stars (NBA G League)	
Zack Austin	November 18	Cleveland Cavaliers	Cleveland Charge (NBA G League)	

=== Going to other North American leagues ===
The new league of all players is the NBA G League, although some players have returned to their former team, as shown below. The NBA contract status of nearly all players is unrestricted free agent, and the rest is stated otherwise.

*	Denotes NBA G League players who returned to their former team
^{†}	Previously on a two-way contract
	Denotes players whose NBA contract status is unsigned draft pick
^{R}	Denotes unsigned players whose free-agent rights were renounced

Player	Date signed	New team	NBA team	Ref
Cody Martin	September 9	Mexico City Capitanes	Indiana Pacers	
Hunter Dickinson* ^{†}	October 23	Laketown Squadron	New Orleans Pelicans	
Payton Sandfort ^{†}	October 23	Iowa Wolves	Oklahoma City Thunder	
Richie Saunders	October 23	Memphis Hustle	Memphis Grizzlies	
Tyler Burton	October 23	Santa Cruz Warriors	Memphis Grizzlies	
Elfrid Payton	October 23	Westchester Knicks	New Orleans Pelicans	
Keon Johnson	October 23	College Park Skyhawks	Brooklyn Nets	
Tyler Smith ^{†}	October 23	Rio Grande Valley Vipers	Dallas Mavericks	
Jeremy Sochan	October 23	Texas Legends	New York Knicks	
Miles Kelly ^{†}	October 23	Santa Cruz Warriors	Dallas Mavericks	
Taelon Peter ^{†}	October 23	Austin Spurs	Indiana Pacers	
Trevor Keels ^{†}	October 23	Capital City Go-Go	Miami Heat	
Jahmir Young	October 23	Coachella Valley Lakers	Miami Heat	
Isaiah Stevens ^{†}	October 23	Windy City Bulls	Sacramento Kings	
Dalen Terry ^{†}	October 23	Santa Cruz Warriors	Philadelphia 76ers	
Trey Jemison III ^{†}	October 23	Raptors 905	New York Knicks	
Yuki Kawamura ^{†}	October 23	San Diego Clippers	Chicago Bulls	
C. J. Huntley ^{†}	October 23	Valley Suns	Phoenix Suns	
Dariq Whitehead	October 23	Oklahoma City Blue	Memphis Grizzlies	
Ömer Yurtseven	October 23	Rio Grande Valley Vipers	Golden State Warriors	
Tristen Newton ^{†}	October 23	Stockton Kings	Houston Rockets	
Lester Quiñones ^{†}	October 23	Sioux Falls Skyforce	New Orleans Pelicans	
Kylor Kelley	October 23	Sioux Falls Skyforce	New Orleans Pelicans	
Caleb Houstan ^{†}	October 23	Rip City Remix	Atlanta Hawks	
Andre Jackson Jr.	October 23	Raptors 905	Milwaukee Bucks	
Kennedy Chandler	October 23	Valley Suns	Utah Jazz	
JD Davison	October 23	Osceola Magic	Houston Rockets	
Buddy Boeheim	October 23	Oklahoma City Blue	Oklahoma City Thunder	
Kenyon Martin Jr.	October 23	Iowa Wolves	Utah Jazz	
N'Faly Dante	October 23	Westchester Knicks	Atlanta Hawks	
Johni Broome	October 23	Wisconsin Herd	Philadelphia 76ers	
Yuri Collins	October 23	Memphis Hustle	Golden State Warriors	
Markquis Nowell ^{†}	October 23	Laketown Squadron	Toronto Raptors	
Emanuel Miller ^{†}	October 23	Grand Rapids Gold	Chicago Bulls	
Dillon Jones ^{†}	October 23	Delaware Blue Coats	New York Knicks	
Norchad Omier ^{†}	October 23	Cleveland Charge	Los Angeles Clippers	
John Poulakidas ^{†}	October 26	San Diego Clippers	Dallas Mavericks	
Adama Bal	October 28	Wisconsin Herd	Memphis Grizzlies	
Blake Hinson ^{†}	October 30	Stockton Kings	Utah Jazz	
Rob Dillingham	November 13	Westchester Knicks	Charlotte Hornets	

=== Going abroad ===
The following players were previously on NBA rosters, but chose to sign with abroad teams after their contract expired and they became free agents. The list also includes unsigned 2026 draft picks who signed with overseas teams, but excludes unsigned 2025 draft picks who were already playing overseas before the draft.

	Denotes players whose NBA contract status is unsigned draft pick
*	Denotes international players who returned to their home country
^{†}	Denotes players who were on a two-way contract

Player	Date signed	New team	New country	Former NBA team	Ref
Joe Ingles *	May 19	Melbourne United	Australia	Minnesota Timberwolves	
Dario Šarić	June 16	Anadolu Efes	Turkey	Sacramento Kings	
E. J. Liddell ^{†}	June 17	Aris	Greece	Brooklyn Nets	
Xavier Tillman	June 24	Trabzonspor	Turkey	Charlotte Hornets	
Alex Antetokounmpo * ^{†}	June 27	Promitheas Patras	Greece	Milwaukee Bucks	
Bobi Klintman	July 2	Virtus Bologna	Italy	Detroit Pistons	
Guerschon Yabusele	July 8	Panathinaikos	Greece	Chicago Bulls	
Amir Coffey	July 9	Hapoel Tel Aviv	Israel	Phoenix Suns	
DaQuan Jeffries	July 11	Beşiktaş	Turkey	Sacramento Kings	
Jonas Valančiūnas *	July 15	Žalgiris	Lithuania	Denver Nuggets	
Tyson Etienne ^{†}	July 16	Paris	France	Brooklyn Nets	
Jeremiah Robinson-Earl ^{†}	July 16	Aris	Greece	Dallas Mavericks	
Patrick Baldwin Jr. ^{†}	July 18	Crvena zvezda	Serbia	Sacramento Kings	
Nate Williams^{†}	July 18	Chiba Jets	Japan	Golden State Warriors	
Mouhamadou Gueye	July 23	Valencia	Spain	Charlotte Hornets	
Luke Travers * ^{†}	July 23	Melbourne United	Australia	Cleveland Cavaliers	
Tyrese Martin ^{†}	July 24	Barcelona	Spain	Philadelphia 76ers	
David Roddy ^{†}	July 24	Hapoel Jerusalem	Israel	Denver Nuggets	
Tosan Evbuomwan ^{†}	July 27	Barcelona	Spain	Charlotte Hornets	
A. J. Lawson	July 27	Baskonia	Spain	Toronto Raptors	
Wendell Moore Jr. ^{†}	July 28	Virtus Bologna	Italy	Detroit Pistons	
Josh Oduro ^{†}	July 28	Melbourne United	Australia	New Orleans Pelicans	
Jacob Toppin ^{†}	July 29	Hapoel Tel Aviv	Israel	Atlanta Hawks	
Lucas Williamson	July 30	Start Lublin	Poland	Memphis Grizzlies	
Cole Anthony	August 5	Melbourne United	Australia	Milwaukee Bucks	
Mac McClung ^{†}	August 6	Bàsquet Girona	Spain	Chicago Bulls	
Jack Kayil *	August 7	Alba Berlin	Germany	New York Knicks	
Keaton Wallace	August 9	Maccabi Tel Aviv	Israel	Atlanta Hawks	
Lachlan Olbrich ^{†}	August 10	Alvark Tokyo	Japan	Chicago Bulls	
MarJon Beauchamp ^{†}	August 12	Bayern Munich	Germany	Philadelphia 76ers	
Max Shulga	August 14	Real Madrid	Spain	Boston Celtics	
Olivier Sarr ^{†}	August 15	Real Madrid	Spain	Cleveland Cavaliers	
Ethan Thompson ^{†}	August 16	Partizan	Serbia	Indiana Pacers	
Garrison Mathews	August 18	Olimpia Milano	Italy	Indiana Pacers	
Aaron Holiday	August 19	Maxima Roma	Italy	Houston Rockets	
Javonte Cooke	August 21	Beijing Royal Fighters	China	Portland Trail Blazers	
TyTy Washington Jr. ^{†}	August 24	ASVEL Basket	France	Los Angeles Clippers	
Sharife Cooper ^{†}	August 25	Liaoning Flying Leopards	China	Washington Wizards	
Malique Lewis	August 25	Cairns Taipans	Australia	Milwaukee Bucks	
Isaiah Livers	August 26	Yokohama B-Corsairs	Japan	Phoenix Suns	
Thanasis Antetokounmpo *	September 1	Aris	Greece	Milwaukee Bucks	
Dalano Banton	September 8	Shandong Hi-Speed Kirin	China	Boston Celtics	
Lindy Waters III	September 15	Beijing Shougang	China	San Antonio Spurs	
Nick Smith Jr.	September 16	Real Madrid	Spain	Los Angeles Lakers	
Lajae Jones	September 21	Pallacanestro Trieste	Italy	Golden State Warriors	
D'Angelo Russell	September 30	Shanghai Sharks	China	Memphis Grizzlies	
Kelly Olynyk	October 3	BC Roma	Italy	San Antonio Spurs	
Cameron Payne	October 3	Anadolu Efes	Turkey	Philadelphia 76ers	
Christian Koloko ^{†}	October 18	Crvena zvezda	Serbia	Atlanta Hawks	
Antonio Reeves ^{†}	October 21	Partizan	Serbia	Charlotte Hornets	
John Konchar	October 22	Olympiacos	Greece	Utah Jazz	
Kevin Knox II	October 29	Unicaja Málaga	Spain	Golden State Warriors	
Dwight Powell	October 30	Fenerbahçe	Turkey	Dallas Mavericks	
Killian Hayes	November 18	Barcelona	Spain	Sacramento Kings	

=== Waived ===
	Denotes player who did not clear waivers because his contract was claimed by another team
^{†}	Denotes players who were on a two-way contract
	Denotes player who was released before end of 10-day contract
	Denotes players whose contracts were voided

Player	Date waived	Former team	Ref
Jonathan Isaac	June 27	Orlando Magic	
Leaky Black ^{†}	July 1	Washington Wizards	
Kam Jones	July 1	Chicago Bulls	
Payton Sandfort ^{†}	July 2	Oklahoma City Thunder	
Pete Nance	July 3	Milwaukee Bucks	
DeMar DeRozan	July 6	Sacramento Kings	
Tosan Evbuomwan ^{†}	July 6	Charlotte Hornets	
Micah Potter	July 8	Indiana Pacers	
Jonas Valančiūnas	July 8	Denver Nuggets	
Dalano Banton	July 9	Boston Celtics	
Malachi Smith	July 10	Brooklyn Nets	
Taelon Peter ^{†}	July 20	Indiana Pacers	
Tyler Smith ^{†}	July 20	Dallas Mavericks	
Peter Suder ^{†}	July 21	Los Angeles Lakers	
Emanuel Miller ^{†}	July 22	San Antonio Spurs	
Kentavious Caldwell-Pope	July 25	Memphis Grizzlies	
Dalen Terry	July 26	Philadelphia 76ers	
Isaiah Stevens ^{†}	July 27	Sacramento Kings	
Mouhamadou Gueye	July 30	Charlotte Hornets	
JD Davison	August 5	Houston Rockets	
Sean Pedulla ^{†}	August 6	Los Angeles Clippers	
Haywood Highsmith ^{†}	August 12	Phoenix Suns	
Ethan Thompson ^{†}	August 13	Indiana Pacers	
Hunter Dickinson ^{†}	August 18	New Orleans Pelicans	
Klay Thompson	August 21	Dallas Mavericks	
Tristen Newton ^{†}	August 26	Houston Rockets	
Julian Reese ^{†}	August 28	Denver Nuggets	
Cam Whitmore	August 28	Cleveland Cavaliers	
John Konchar	August 29	Minnesota Timberwolves	
Josiah Allick	September 1	Charlotte Hornets	
Matthew Murrell	September 2	Utah Jazz	
Trey Townsend	September 2	Charlotte Hornets	
Kyle Mangas	September 3	Charlotte Hornets	
Jarkel Joiner	September 4	Charlotte Hornets	
Kobe Stewart	September 7	Charlotte Hornets	
Taj Gibson	September 8	New Orleans Pelicans	
Devon Higgs	September 9	Atlanta Hawks	
Keyshawn Bryant	September 10	Atlanta Hawks	
Lamont Butler	September 11	Atlanta Hawks	
Devin Carter	September 11	Atlanta Hawks	
Hank Morgan	September 11	Boston Celtics	
Caleb Grill	September 14	Boston Celtics	
Christian Shumate	September 14	New Orleans Pelicans	
Jaden Akins	September 15	New York Knicks	
Keion Brooks Jr.	September 15	Indiana Pacers	
Dawson Garcia	September 15	Detroit Pistons	
Cameron Hildreth	September 15	Indiana Pacers	
MJ Iraldi	September 15	Indiana Pacers	
Basheer Jihad	September 15	Detroit Pistons	
Nick Jourdain	September 15	New York Knicks	
Mitchell Mascari	September 15	New York Knicks	
Igor Miličić Jr.	September 15	New York Knicks	
Dwight Murray Jr.	September 15	Brooklyn Nets	
Toby Okani	September 15	New York Knicks	
Johnny O'Neil	September 15	New Orleans Pelicans	
Wade Taylor IV	September 15	Indiana Pacers	
Isaiah Wong	September 15	Brooklyn Nets	
Paul Zilinskas	September 15	New York Knicks	
Aziz Bandaogo	September 16	New Orleans Pelicans	
Chance McMillian	September 16	Golden State Warriors	
Liam Robbins	September 16	New York Knicks	
Deivon Smith	September 16	Golden State Warriors	
Jordan Schakel	September 17	Phoenix Suns	
Sean McNeil	September 17	Cleveland Cavaliers	
William Baker	September 18	Atlanta Hawks	
Jules Bernard	September 18	Minnesota Timberwolves	
Jacksen Moni	September 18	Golden State Warriors	
David Stockton	September 18	Phoenix Suns	
Anton Watson	September 18	Los Angeles Lakers	
Markquis Nowell	September 19	New Orleans Pelicans	
Elias Ralph	September 19	Golden State Warriors	
Stevie Thompson	September 19	Minnesota Timberwolves	
Bez Mbeng	September 20	Charlotte Hornets	
Obi Agbim	September 21	Golden State Warriors	
Dominique Daniels Jr.	September 21	New Orleans Pelicans	
Kowacie Reeves Jr.	September 21	Indiana Pacers	
DJ Rodman	September 21	Brooklyn Nets	
Aaron Scott	September 21	Brooklyn Nets	
Jalen Warley	September 21	Indiana Pacers	
Drake Allen	September 22	Detroit Pistons	
DJ Armstrong	September 22	Charlotte Hornets	
Tre Carroll	September 22	Charlotte Hornets	
Jalen Crutcher	September 22	Minnesota Timberwolves	
Reese Dixon-Waters	September 22	Denver Nuggets	
Keonte Jones	September 22	Denver Nuggets	
Solomon Washington	September 22	Minnesota Timberwolves	
Mark Armstrong	September 23	Portland Trail Blazers	
Ace Baldwin Jr.	September 23	Orlando Magic	
Ricky Council IV	September 23	Orlando Magic	
Jarron Cumberland	September 23	Orlando Magic	
Samson Johnson	September 23	Portland Trail Blazers	
Boopie Miller	September 23	Denver Nuggets	
Jayden Nunn	September 23	San Antonio Spurs	
Au'Diese Toney	September 23	Orlando Magic	
Miles Barnstable	September 24	San Antonio Spurs	
Keylan Boone	September 24	Portland Trail Blazers	
Johni Broome	September 24	Los Angeles Clippers	
John Camden	September 24	Phoenix Suns	
Corey Camper	September 24	Phoenix Suns	
Ibrahima Diallo	September 24	Utah Jazz	
Barry Dunning Jr.	September 24	Portland Trail Blazers	
Justin Harmon	September 24	Utah Jazz	
AJ Hoggard	September 24	Toronto Raptors	
Sam Hoiberg	September 24	Phoenix Suns	
Keon Johnson	September 24	Atlanta Hawks	
Jordan Riley	September 24	Detroit Pistons	
Payton Sandfort	September 24	Minnesota Timberwolves	
Nate Santos	September 24	Minnesota Timberwolves	
Mark Sears	September 24	Portland Trail Blazers	
Gabe Levin	September 25	Sacramento Kings	
Houston Mallette	September 25	Chicago Bulls	
Tyrone Marshall Jr.	September 25	Sacramento Kings	
D'Angelo Russell	September 25	Memphis Grizzlies	
Jamarion Sharp	September 25	Los Angeles Clippers	
Romeo Weems	September 25	Detroit Pistons	
Yuri Collins	September 26	Memphis Grizzlies	
Eric Dixon	September 26	Memphis Grizzlies	
Brendan Hausen	September 26	Memphis Grizzlies	
Kira Lewis Jr.	September 26	Memphis Grizzlies	
Ryan Nembhard	September 26	Charlotte Hornets	
Jason Preston	September 26	Los Angeles Clippers	
Hunter Sallis	September 26	Los Angeles Clippers	
Nick Boyd	September 27	Golden State Warriors	
Gary Harris	September 27	Detroit Pistons	
Meechie Johnson	September 27	Los Angeles Lakers	
KeShawn Murphy	September 27	Washington Wizards	
Nick Pringle	September 27	Brooklyn Nets	
Chase Ross	September 27	Los Angeles Lakers	
Bryson Warren	September 27	Detroit Pistons	
Rob Dillingham	September 28	Charlotte Hornets	
Lawson Lovering	September 28	Memphis Grizzlies	
Dwight Powell	October 19	Dallas Mavericks	
Sean Pedulla^{†}	October 19	Houston Rockets	
Dalton Knecht	October 19	Los Angeles Lakers	
Walter Clayton Jr.	October 19	Memphis Grizzlies	
Micah Peavy	October 19	Memphis Grizzlies	
Kevin Porter Jr.	October 19	Milwaukee Bucks	
C. J. Huntley^{†}	October 19	Phoenix Suns	
Adam Flagler^{†}	October 19	Sacramento Kings	
Koby Brea^{†}	October 19	Phoenix Suns	
Blake Hinson^{†}	October 21	Utah Jazz	
Kevin McCullar Jr.^{†}	October 23	New York Knicks	
Otega Oweh^{†}	October 24	Oklahoma City Thunder	
AK Okereke^{†}	October 28	Los Angeles Lakers	
Riley Minix^{†}	November 6	Cleveland Cavaliers	
Carson Cooper^{†}	November 7	Memphis Grizzlies	
Tristan Enaruna^{†}	November 7	Cleveland Cavaliers	
Lawson Lovering^{†}	November 10	Los Angeles Lakers	
Trey Alexander^{†}	November 16	Utah Jazz	
Keshon Gilbert^{†}	November 16	Atlanta Hawks	
Riley Minix^{†}	November 18	Cleveland Cavaliers	

==== Training camp cuts ====
All players listed did not make the final roster.
^{†} On a two-way contract.
^{C} Claimed off waivers by another team.

Atlanta Hawks	Boston Celtics	Brooklyn Nets	Charlotte Hornets	Chicago Bulls
Giorgi Bezhanishvili; Cameron Corhen; Kobe Johnson; Isaac McKneely	Tucker DeVries; Hayden Gray; Gabe McGlothan; Milos Uzan	Dion Brown; Dain Dainja; Ben Humrichous	Pat Connaughton; Wyatt Fricks; DaJuan Gordon; Jarkel Joiner; Latrell Wrightsell Jr.	Brandon Boston Jr.; Jalen Bridges; Drew Peterson; Orlando Robinson; Isaiah Stevens; Peter Suder; Marquel Sutton
Cleveland Cavaliers	Dallas Mavericks	Denver Nuggets	Detroit Pistons	Golden State Warriors
Rashaun Agee; Zack Austin; Curtis Jones; Kadary Richmond; Jaxson Robinson; Tre’Von Spillers; Noam Yaacov	Matt Cross; Guillermo Diaz-Graham; Jorge Diaz-Graham; Darin Green Jr.; Seth Lundy; Chris Mantis; John Poulakidas^{†}	Pedro Bradshaw; Steven Crowl; Dane Goodwin; Coleman Hawkins; Emanuel Miller; KJ Simpson^{†}; Lonnie Walker IV	John Ukomadu; Brice Williams	Tyler Burton; Miles Kelly; Dalen Terry; Alex Toohey
Houston Rockets	Indiana Pacers	Los Angeles Clippers	Los Angeles Lakers	Memphis Grizzlies
Rafael Castro^{†}; Bryce Harris; Cameron Matthews; Caleb McConnell	James Johnson; Keba Keita; Rienk Mast	Cam Christie; Yuki Kawamura; Fletcher Loyer; Nathan Mensah; Miye Oni; Jahmyl Telfort; Blake Wesley; DeAndre Williams	Rafael Castro; William Kyle III; Cole Swider; Aniwaniwa Tait-Jones; Jahmir Young	Zach Cleveland; Jordan Hawkins
Miami Heat	Milwaukee Bucks	Minnesota Timberwolves	New Orleans Pelicans	New York Knicks
Ezra Ausar; J'Vonne Hadley; Kylor Kelley; Gabe Madsen; Bez Mbeng; Lester Quiñones; Ian Schieffelin; Dennis Smith Jr.	Johni Broome; John Butler Jr.; Pete Nance^{C}; Jake Stephens	Enrique Freeman^{†}; Kenyon Martin Jr.; Norchad Omier; Antonio Reeves; Drew Timme ^{C}	Kobe Bufkin; Hunter Dickinson; Caleb Houstan; Christian Koloko; Jalon Moore	Ochai Agbaji; Tony Bradley ^{C}; Bruce Brown; N'Faly Dante; Drew Eubanks; John Konchar; Toby Okani; Dink Pate
Oklahoma City Thunder	Orlando Magic	Philadelphia 76ers	Phoenix Suns	Portland Trail Blazers
Buddy Boeheim; Andrew Holifield; Nate Johnson; Robert McCray V; Anthony Pritchard; Zhaire Smith; Christoph Tilly; Dariq Whitehead; Lamar Wilkerson	Malaki Branham; Johnell Davis; JD Davison; Kevin Knox II; Mike Sharavjamts	Cris Carroll; Taye Fields; Dillon Jones; Duke Miles; Jameer Nelson Jr.; Saint Thomas	Kennedy Chandler; Haywood Highsmith; Phillip Wheeler	Caleb Houstan; Lee Hyun-jung; Jaylen Martin; Jeremy Sochan
Sacramento Kings	San Antonio Spurs	Toronto Raptors	Utah Jazz	Washington Wizards
Sean East II; Viktor Lakhin; Trhae Mitchell; Damari Monsanto; David Muoka; Tristen Newton; Aaron Nkrumah; Elfrid Payton	Kendall Brown; R. J. Davis; Jon Elmore; Taelon Peter; Terry Taylor; Malik Williams	Nimari Burnett; Jalen Celestine; Tyson Degenhart; Chucky Hepburn^{†}; Andre Jackson Jr.; Trey Jemison^{†}; Tyreke Key; Jamarion Sharp	Jonas Aidoo; Tamar Bates^{†}; Terrell Brown Jr.; Taylor Funk; Jaelen House; Chance Moore; Mohamed Wague	Jazian Gortman; Nolan Hickman; Trevor Keels; Skal Labissière; Chris Livingston; Steve Settle III; Alondes Williams

== Draft ==
The 2026 NBA draft was held on June 23–24, 2026, at Barclays Center in Brooklyn, New York. In two rounds of the draft, 60 amateur United States college basketball players and other eligible players, including international players, were selected. The following players signed a regular rookie contract unless noted otherwise.

Denotes players who signed a two-way contract
Denotes players whose NBA two-way contract was upgraded to standard NBA contract
Denotes players who are expected to play abroad
Denotes players who are expected to play in college
Denotes players who are expected to play in the NBA G League without signing an NBA contract

=== First round ===
Pick	Player	Date signed	Team (Note: Team denotes the team that holds the players' draft rights at the time of contract signing. Teams in parentheses denotes the teams that drafted the players before any trade occurred.)	Ref
1	AJ Dybantsa	July 2	Washington Wizards	
2	Darryn Peterson	July 1	Utah Jazz	
3	Cameron Boozer	July 13	Memphis Grizzlies	
4	Caleb Wilson	July 3	Chicago Bulls	
5	Keaton Wagler	July 3	Los Angeles Clippers	
6	Mikel Brown Jr.	July 2	Brooklyn Nets	
7	Darius Acuff Jr.	July 1	Sacramento Kings	
8	Kingston Flemings	July 2	Atlanta Hawks	
9	Morez Johnson Jr.	July 2	Dallas Mavericks	
10	Brayden Burries	July 5	Milwaukee Bucks	
11	Yaxel Lendeborg	July 1	Golden State Warriors	
12	Aday Mara	July 3	Oklahoma City Thunder	
13	Nate Ament	July 8	Milwaukee Bucks (rights acquired from Miami)	
14	Hannes Steinbach	July 6	Charlotte Hornets	
15	Dailyn Swain	July 3	Chicago Bulls	
16	Bennett Stirtz	July 3	Oklahoma City Thunder (rights acquired from Memphis)	
17	Ebuka Okorie	July 6	Detroit Pistons (rights acquired from Oklahoma City via Memphis)	
18	Christian Anderson	July 6	Charlotte Hornets	
19	Allen Graves	July 2	Toronto Raptors	
20	Jayden Quaintance	July 6	San Antonio Spurs	
21	Karim López	July 30	Memphis Grizzlies (rights acquired from Detroit)	
22	Labaron Philon Jr.	July 3	Philadelphia 76ers	
23	Zuby Ejiofor	July 1	Atlanta Hawks	
24	Cameron Carr	July 2	Los Angeles Lakers (rights acquired from New York)	
25	Sergio de Larrea	July 3	Dallas Mavericks (rights acquired from LA Lakers)	
26	Tarris Reed	July 6	San Antonio Spurs (rights acquired from Denver)	
27	Chris Cenac	July 5	Boston Celtics	
28	Joshua Jefferson	July 10	Brooklyn Nets (rights acquired from Minnesota)	
29	Alex Karaban	July 1	Sacramento Kings (rights acquired from Cleveland)	
30	Koa Peat	July 1	Phoenix Suns (rights acquired from Dallas)	

=== Second round ===
Pick	Player	Date signed	Team	Ref
31	Bruce Thornton	July 7	Houston Rockets (rights acquired from New York)	
32	Richie Saunders	November 7	Memphis Grizzlies	
33	Isaiah Evans	July 11	Minnesota Timberwolves (rights acquired from Brooklyn)	
34	Meleek Thomas	July 1	Cleveland Cavaliers	
35	Trevon Brazile	July 10	Denver Nuggets	
36	Baba Miller	July 9	Los Angeles Clippers	
37	Ryan Conwell	July 1	Miami Heat (rights acquired from Oklahoma City)	
38	Braden Smith	August 17	Indiana Pacers (rights acquired from Chicago)	
39	Jack Kayil	—	New York Knicks (rights acquired from Houston)	
40	Dillon Mitchell	August 5	Boston Celtics	
41	Otega Oweh	July 3	Oklahoma City Thunder (rights acquired from Miami)	
42	Ja'Kobi Gillespie	July 6	San Antonio Spurs	
43	Tyler Bilodeau	July 2	Brooklyn Nets	
44	Maliq Brown	July 6	San Antonio Spurs	
45	Emanuel Sharp	July 1	Sacramento Kings	
46	Felix Okpara	July 7	Washington Wizards (rights acquired from Orlando)	
47	Tyler Nickel	September 26	New York Knicks	
48	Tobi Lawal	July 6	Dallas Mavericks	
49	Bryce Hopkins	August 26	Denver Nuggets	
50	Jaden Bradley	July 4	Toronto Raptors	
51	Izaiyah Nelson	July 1	Orlando Magic (rights acquired from Washington)	
52	Henri Veesaar	July 1	Atlanta Hawks (rights acquired from LA Clippers)	
53	Ugonna Onyenso	July 6	Detroit Pistons (rights acquired from Houston)	
54	Lajae Jones	—	Golden State Warriors	
55	Nick Martinelli	July 5	Los Angeles Clippers (rights acquired from New York)	
56	Vsevolod Ishchenko	—	Dallas Mavericks (rights acquired from Chicago)	
57	Narcisse Ngoy	—	Los Angeles Clippers (rights acquired from Atlanta)	
58	Jaron Pierre Jr.	July 24	New Orleans Pelicans	
59	Trey Kaufman-Renn	—	Minnesota Timberwolves	
60	Malique Lewis	—	Milwaukee Bucks (rights acquired from Washington)	

=== Previous years' draftees ===
Draft	Pick	Player	Date signed	Team	Previous team	Ref
2025	47	Bogoljub Marković	July 1	Milwaukee Bucks	Mega Basket (Serbia)	
2023	56	Tarik Biberović	July 10	Dallas Mavericks	Fenerbahçe (Turkey)	
2022	39	Khalifa Diop	September 2	Cleveland Cavaliers	Saski Baskonia (Spain)	
