= AK Okereke =

American basketball player (born 2003)

No. 31 – Coachella Valley Lakers
- Position: Power forward
- League: NBA G League

Personal information
- Born: July 2, 2003 (age 23) Clovis, California, U.S.
- Listed height: 6 ft 7 in (2.01 m)
- Listed weight: 244 lb (111 kg)

Career information
- High school: Clovis North (Fresno, California)
- College: Cornell (2022–2025); Vanderbilt (2025–2026)
- NBA draft: 2026: undrafted
- Playing career: 2026–present

Career history
- 2026–present: Coachella Valley Lakers
- Stats at NBA.com
- Stats at Basketball Reference

Akachi Onyedika "AK" Okereke (born July 2, 2003) is an American professional basketball player for the Coachella Valley Lakers of the NBA G League. He played college basketball for the Cornell Big Red and the Vanderbilt Commodores.

== Early life and high school ==
Okereke was born in Clovis, California, and attended Clovis North High School. As a senior, he averaged 22.3 points, 8.5 rebounds and 3.4 assists per game and earned third team all-state honors. Okereke did a prep year at Golden State Prep. He committed to Cornell over UCLA and several Division II programs.

== College career ==
Okereke played sparingly as a freshman at Cornell after walking onto the basketball team as a student manager. He averaged 7.1 points, 2.3 rebounds, and 1.5 assists per game as a sophomore. As a junior, Okereke averaged 13.9 points, 4.6 rebounds, and 4.1 assists per game, after which he transferred to Vanderbilt. On February 14, 2026, he dropped 23 points, five rebounds, and three assists in a win over Texas A&M. At Vanderbilt, Okereke averaged 9.6 points and 3.6 rebounds per game while shooting 48.1% from the field. He considered applying for an additional year of eligibility but ultimately opted to turn professional.

== Professional career ==
=== Coachella Valley Lakers (2026–present) ===
After going unselected in the 2026 NBA draft, Okereke signed a two-way contract with the Los Angeles Lakers on July 5, 2026, but was later waived by the Los Angeles Lakers on October 28, 2026. Okereke was later re-acquired by Coachella Valley Lakers on November 1, 2026.
