= 2026–27 Auburn Tigers men's basketball team =

American college basketball season

2026–27 Auburn Tigers men's basketball
- Conference: Southeastern Conference
- Record: 3–3 (0–0 SEC)
- Head coach: Steven Pearl (2nd season)
- Assistant coaches: Ira Bowman (9th season); Corey Williams (4th season); Ian Borders (2nd season); Mike Burgomaster (4th season); Matt Gatens (2nd season)
- Home arena: Neville Arena

2026–27 Southeastern Conference men's basketball standings
	Conf.				Overall
Team	W		L	PCT	W		L	PCT
Georgia	0	–	0	–	6	–	0	1.000
Texas A&M	0	–	0	–	6	–	0	1.000
No. 15 Vanderbilt	0	–	0	–	6	–	0	1.000
No. 16 Alabama	0	–	0	–	5	–	0	1.000
No. 25 LSU	0	–	0	–	5	–	0	1.000
South Carolina	0	–	0	–	5	–	0	1.000
No. 14 Tennessee	0	–	0	–	5	–	0	1.000
No. 6 Texas	0	–	0	–	5	–	0	1.000
Ole Miss	0	–	0	–	4	–	0	1.000
No. 1 Florida	0	–	0	–	6	–	1	.857
Mississippi State	0	–	0	–	5	–	1	.833
Missouri	0	–	0	–	5	–	1	.833
Oklahoma	0	–	0	–	4	–	1	.800
No. 20 Arkansas	0	–	0	–	4	–	2	.667
Kentucky	0	–	0	–	4	–	2	.667
Auburn	0	–	0	–	3	–	3	.500
† 2027 SEC tournament winner As of November 22, 2026; Rankings from AP poll

The 2026–27 Auburn Tigers men's basketball team represents Auburn University during the 2026–27 NCAA Division I men's basketball season as a member of the Southeastern Conference. The team's head coach is Steven Pearl in his second season at Auburn. The team plays its home games at Neville Arena in Auburn, Alabama.

== Previous season ==
The Tigers finished the 2025–26 season with a record of 22–16, 7–11 in SEC play to finish 12th in the conference. In the SEC Tournament, Auburn beat Mississippi State in the first round before falling to Tennessee in the second round. Auburn was one of the first four teams out of the NCAA Tournament, instead competing as the No. 1 seed in the National Invitation Tournament. The Tigers defeated South Alabama, Seattle, Nevada, Illinois State and Tulsa to win the championship of the NIT for the first time.

== Offseason ==
=== Departures ===
Name	Number	Pos.	Height	Weight	Year	Hometown	Reason for departure
Abdul Bashir	2	G	6'7"	165	Junior	Omaha, NE	Transferred to San Francisco
KeShawn Murphy	3	F	6'10"	230	Senior	Birmingham, AL	Graduated
Kaden Magwood	5	G	6'2"	175	Freshman	Louisville, KY	Transferred to Murray State
Elyjah Freeman	6	G/F	6'8"	185	Sophomore	Palm Beach, FL	Transferred to Texas
Keyshawn Hall	7	F	6'7"	225	Senior	Cleveland, OH	Graduated, transferred to St. John's
CJ Williams	13	G	6'2"	185	Senior	DeLand, FL	Graduated
Emeka Opurum	14	C	7'0"	205	Sophomore	Lagos, Nigeria	Transferred
Reed Trapp	22	G	6'6"	180	Senior	Muscle Shoals, AL	Graduated
Sebastian Williams-Adams	23	F	6'8"	230	Freshman	Houston, TX	Transferred to Vanderbilt
Filip Jović	38	F	6'8"	225	Freshman	Bijeljina, Bosnia and Herzegovina	Transferred to UCLA

=== Incoming transfers ===
Name	Number	Pos.	Height	Weight	Year	Hometown	Previous school
George Kimble III	3	G	6'1"	200	Senior	Tampa, FL	Vanderbilt
Kolby King	4	G	6'1"	185	Senior	Pompano Beach, FL	Utah State
Thomas Dowd	5	F	6'8"	235	Senior	Dothan, AL	Troy
Owen Freeman	8	F	6'10"	245	Senior	Moline, IL	Creighton
Bukky Oboye	12	C	7'1"	230	Senior	Houston, TX	Santa Clara
Adam Olsen	24	G	6'8"	225	Senior	Surrey, B.C, Canada	South Alabama

=== 2026 recruiting class ===
==== High school ====
College recruiting
Name	Hometown	School	Height	Weight	Commit date
Caleb Williams; G	Tampa, Florida	Overtime Elite	6 ft 5 in (1.96 m)	195 lb (88 kg)	Oct 24, 2025
Caleb Williams; G	Recruit ratings: Rivals: 247Sports: ESPN: (87)				
Overall recruit ranking:
Note: In many cases, Scout, Rivals, 247Sports, On3, and ESPN may conflict in their listings of height and weight.; In these cases, the average was taken. ESPN grades are on a 100-point scale.; Sources: "Auburn 2026 Basketball Commitments". Rivals.; "2026 Team Ranking". Rivals.

==== International ====
College recruiting
Name	Hometown	School	Height	Weight	Commit date
Narcisse Ngoy; C	Champigny-sur-Marne, France	Poitiers Basket 86	7 ft 0 in (2.13 m)	280 lb (130 kg)	Mar 31, 2026
Narcisse Ngoy; C	Recruit ratings: No ratings found				
Overall recruit ranking:
Note: In many cases, Scout, Rivals, 247Sports, On3, and ESPN may conflict in their listings of height and weight.; In these cases, the average was taken. ESPN grades are on a 100-point scale.; Sources: "Auburn 2026 Basketball Commitments". Rivals.; "2026 Team Ranking". Rivals.

== Roster ==
2026–27 Auburn Tigers men's basketball team
Players
Coaches

Pos.	#	Name	Height	Weight	Year	Previous school	Hometown
G	0	Tahaad Pettiford	6 ft 1 in (1.85 m)	180 lb (82 kg)	Jr	Hudson Catholic Regional HS	Jersey City, NJ
G	1	Kevin Overton	6 ft 5 in (1.96 m)	205 lb (93 kg)	Sr	Texas Tech	Oklahoma City, OK
G	2	Caleb Williams	6 ft 5 in (1.96 m)	210 lb (95 kg)	Fr	Overtime Elite	Tampa, FL
G	3	George Kimble III	6 ft 1 in (1.85 m)	200 lb (91 kg)	Sr	Vanderbilt	Tampa, FL
G	4	Kolby King	6 ft 1 in (1.85 m)	185 lb (84 kg)	Sr	Utah State	Pompano Beach, FL
F	5	Thomas Dowd	6 ft 8 in (2.03 m)	235 lb (107 kg)	Sr	Troy	Dothan, AL
G	7	Drake Cardwell	6 ft 5 in (1.96 m)	210 lb (95 kg)	So	Evans HS (Ga.)	Augusta, GA
F	8	Owen Freeman	6 ft 10 in (2.08 m)	245 lb (111 kg)	Sr	Creighton	Moline, IL
G	10	Simon Walker	6 ft 5 in (1.96 m)	210 lb (95 kg)	So	Huntsville HS	Huntsville, AL
C	12	Bukky Oboye	7 ft 1 in (2.16 m)	230 lb (104 kg)	Sr	Santa Clara	Houston, TX
G	13	Bradley Pearson	6 ft 1 in (1.85 m)	160 lb (73 kg)	Jr	Southern Union CC	Auburn, AL
G	14	Joah Shay	5 ft 6 in (1.68 m)	145 lb (66 kg)	Jr	Mount Tabor HS	Winston-Salem, NC
F	20	Jeremiah Bowman	6 ft 7 in (2.01 m)	225 lb (102 kg)	So	Wilson Academy (Ga.)	Glassboro, NJ
G	21	Blake Muschalek	6 ft 3 in (1.91 m)	205 lb (93 kg)	Sr	Trinity Christian Academy	Dallas, TX
G	24	Adam Olsen	6 ft 8 in (2.03 m)	225 lb (102 kg)	Sr	South Alabama	Surrey, BC
C	94	Narcisse Ngoy	7 ft 0 in (2.13 m)	280 lb (127 kg)	Sr	Poitiers Basket 86	Champigny-sur-Marne

Head coach

- Steven Pearl (Tennessee)

Assistant coach(es)

- Ira Bowman (Penn)
- Corey Williams (Oklahoma State)
- Mike Burgomaster (Miami (FL))
- Ian Borders (Louisville)
- Matt Gatens (Iowa)

Legend

- (C) Team captain
- (S) Suspended
- (I) Ineligible
- (W) Walk-on
- Injured
- Current redshirt

Roster
Last update: November 5, 2026

== Schedule ==
Date time, TV	Rank^{#}	Opponent^{#}	Result	Record	High points	High rebounds	High assists	Site (attendance) city, state
Exhibition
October 14, 2026*; 7:00 p.m., YouTube		vs. Florida State; Ballin' in Boutwell	L 71–82	–	20 – Pettiford	8 – Oboye	8 – Kimble	Boutwell Auditorium (2,462); Birmingham, AL
October 22, 2026; 7:00 p.m., YouTube		vs. Alabama; The Feud, Rivalry	L 85–87	–	26 – Overton	12 – Dowd	4 – Tied	Legacy Arena (13,184); Birmingham, AL
October 29, 2026; 7:00 p.m.		Samford	W 80–68	–	25 – Overton	8 – Overton	4 – Pettiford	Neville Arena; Auburn, AL
Non-conference regular season
November 4, 2026*; 7:00 p.m., SECN+		Southeastern Louisiana	W 92–59	1–0	18 – Pettiford	9 – Ngoy	4 – Pettiford	Neville Arena (9,121); Auburn, AL
November 9, 2026*; 8:00 p.m., SECN		Appalachian State	W 75–53	2–0	26 – Pettiford	11 – Tied	3 – Tied	Neville Arena (9,121); Auburn, AL
November 13, 2026*; 8:00 p.m., ESPN2		No. 12 Arizona	L 69–80	2–1	15 – Dowd	9 – Dowd	3 – Tied	Neville Arena (9,121); Auburn, AL
November 17, 2026*; 11:00 p.m., ESPN		vs. West Virginia; Players Era 8 quarterfinal	L 70–76	2–2	21 – Pettiford	7 – Tied	3 – Tied	Michelob Ultra Arena (5,144); Las Vegas, NV
November 18, 2026*; 9:00 p.m., ESPN2		vs. UNLV; Players Era 8 consolation round	W 86–71	3–2	20 – Pettiford	11 – Dowd	9 – Kimble III	Michelob Ultra Arena (4,915); Las Vegas, NV
November 19, 2026*; 4:00 p.m., ESPN		vs. Notre Dame; Players Era 8 5th place game	L 73–78	3–3	13 – Freeman	9 – Freeman	5 – Pettiford	Michelob Ultra Arena (2,556); Las Vegas, NV
November 24, 2026*; 7:00 p.m., SECN+		Lipscomb						Neville Arena; Auburn, AL
December 1, 2026*; 6:00 p.m., ESPNU		at Clemson; ACC–SEC Challenge						Littlejohn Coliseum; Clemson, SC
December 6, 2026*; 3:00 p.m., SECN+		Eastern Kentucky						Neville Arena; Auburn, AL
December 13, 2026*; 3:00 p.m., SECN+		Alabama State						Neville Arena; Auburn, AL
December 15, 2026*; 7:00 p.m., SECN+		vs. Middle Tennessee; Rocket City Classic						Von Braun Center; Huntsville, AL
December 19, 2026*; 3:00 p.m., ESPN		vs. Wisconsin; Bad Boy Mowers Series						Bridgestone Arena; Nashville, TN
December 22, 2026*; 7:30 p.m., SECN+		Lehigh						Neville Arena; Auburn, AL
December 29, 2026*; 7:30 p.m., SECN+		Morgan State						Neville Arena; Auburn, AL
SEC regular season
January 2, 2027; 7:30 p.m., SECN		at Texas A&M						Reed Arena; College Station, TX
January 6, 2027; 6:00 p.m., ESPN2/ESPNU		Tennessee						Neville Arena; Auburn, AL
January 9, 2027; 12:00 p.m., SECN		Georgia						Neville Arena; Auburn, AL
January 12, 2027; 8:00 p.m., ESPN/ESPN2		at Texas						Moody Center; Austin, TX
January 16, 2027; 7:30 p.m., SECN		Ole Miss						Neville Arena; Auburn, AL
January 19, 2027; 6:00 p.m., SECN		at Vanderbilt						Memorial Gymnasium; Nashville, TN
January 23, 2027; 2:30 p.m., SECN		at LSU						Pete Maravich Assembly Center; Baton Rouge, LA
January 26, 2027; 6:00 p.m., SECN		Mississippi State						Neville Arena; Auburn, AL
January 30, 2027; 5:00 p.m./5:30 p.m., ESPN/ESPN2		at Alabama; Rivalry						Coleman Coliseum; Tuscaloosa, AL
February 6, 2027; 2:30 p.m., SECN		Oklahoma						Neville Arena; Auburn, AL
February 9, 2027; 6:00 p.m., ESPN2		Florida						Neville Arena; Auburn, AL
February 13, 2027; 6:00 p.m., SECN		at South Carolina						Colonial Life Arena; Columbia, SC
February 16, 2027; 8:00 p.m., ESPN/ESPN2		at Arkansas						Bud Walton Arena; Fayetteville, AR
February 20, 2027; 11:00 a.m., ESPN		Missouri						Neville Arena; Auburn, AL
February 24, 2027; 6:00 p.m., SECN		LSU						Neville Arena; Auburn, AL
February 27, 2027; 3:00 p.m./3:30 p.m., ESPN/ESPN2		at Kentucky						Rupp Arena; Lexington, KY
March 2, 2027; 9:00 p.m., SECN		at Ole Miss						SJB Pavilion; Oxford, MS
March 6, 2027; 5:00 p.m., SECN		Alabama; Rivalry						Neville Arena; Auburn, AL
SEC Tournament
March 10–14, 2027; TBD, ESPN/SECN		vs. TBD						Bridgestone Arena; Nashville, TN
*Non-conference game. ^{#}Rankings from AP Poll. (#) Tournament seedings in parentheses. All times are in Central Time.

== Exhibitions ==
=== vs Florida State ===
YouTube

October 14, 2026
7:00 p.m.

Recap

Florida State Seminoles 82, Auburn Tigers 71
Scoring by half: 32–37, 50–34
Pts: Kameron Taylor, 19; Rebs: Marcis Ponder, 21; Asts: Tied, 3	Pts: Tahaad Pettiford, 20; Rebs: Bukky Oboye, 8 Asts: George Kimble III, 6

Boutwell Auditorium, Birmingham, AL
Attendance: 2,462
Referees: K.B. Burdett Jr., Byron Jarrett, AJ Desai

=== vs Alabama ===
YouTube

October 22, 2026
7:00 p.m.

Recap

Auburn Tigers 85, Alabama Crimson Tide 87
Scoring by half: 41–44, 44–43
Pts: Kevin Overton, 26; Rebs: Thomas Dowd, 12; Asts: Tied, 4	Pts: Amari Allen, 23; Rebs: Keitenn Bristow, 8 Asts: Qayden Samuels, 4

Legacy Arena, Birmingham, AL
Attendance: 13,184
Referees: Bart Lenox, Courtney Green, Don Daily

=== Samford ===
October 29, 2026
7:00 p.m.

Recap

Samford Bulldogs 68, Auburn Tigers 80
Scoring by half: 24–35, 44–45
Pts: Cooper Noard, 30; Rebs: Cooper Noard, 10; Asts: Cade Norris, 5	Pts: Kevin Overton, 25; Rebs: Kevin Overton, 8 Asts: Tahaad Pettiford, 4

Neville Arena, Auburn, AL
Referees: Owen Shortt, Rob Rorke, Erroll Lewis

== Game summaries ==
=== Southeastern Louisiana ===
SECN+

November 4, 2026
7:00 p.m.

Recap

Southeastern Louisiana Lions 59, Auburn Tigers 92
Scoring by half: 25–42, 34–50
Pts: Quincy Allen, 16; Rebs: Tied, 6 Asts: Tyler Rolison, 4	Pts: Tahaad Pettiford, 18; Rebs: Narcisse Ngoy, 9 Asts: Tahaad Pettiford, 4

Neville Arena, Auburn, AL
Attendance: 9,121
Referees: Don Daily, Steven Anderson, Chris Ford

=== Appalachian State ===
SECN

November 9, 2026
8:00 p.m.

Recap

Appalachian State Mountaineers 53, Auburn Tigers 75
Scoring by half: 36–38, 17–37
Pts: Eren Banks, 19; Rebs: Jaylen Colon, 7 Asts: Eren Banks, 3	Pts: Tahaad Pettiford, 26; Rebs: Tied, 11; Asts: Tied, 3

Neville Arena, Auburn, AL
Attendance: 9,121
Referees: K.B. Burdett Jr., Byron Jarrett, Lucas Santos

=== No. 12 Arizona ===
ESPN2

November 13, 2026
8:00 p.m.

Recap

No. 12 Arizona Wildcats 80, Auburn Tigers 69
Scoring by half: 36–32, 44–37
Pts: Caleb Holt, 24; Rebs: Motiejus Krivas, 12; Asts: Motiejus Krivas, 4	Pts: Thomas Dowd, 15; Rebs: Thomas Dowd, 9 Asts: Tied, 3

Neville Arena, Auburn, AL
Attendance: 9,121
Referees: Pat Adams, Courtney Green, Tony Padilla

=== vs West Virginia (Players Era 8 quarterfinal) ===
ESPN

November 17, 2026
11:00 p.m.

Recap

West Virginia Mountaineers 76, Auburn Tigers 70
Scoring by half: 36–31, 40–39
Pts: Brenen Lorient, 19; Rebs: Amadou Seini, 9 Asts: Miles Sadler, 6	Pts: Tahaad Pettiford, 21; Rebs: Tied, 7 Asts: Tied, 3

Michelob Ultra Arena, Las Vegas, NV
Attendance: 5,144
Referees: Byron Jarrett, Tony Henderson, Chance Moore

=== vs UNLV (Players Era 8 consolation round) ===
ESPN2

November 18, 2026
9:00 p.m.

Recap

UNLV Runnin' Rebels 71, Auburn Tigers 86
Scoring by half: 29–37, 42–49
Pts: Tied, 16; Rebs: Tyrin Jones, 6 Asts: Cam Miles, 3	Pts: Tahaad Pettiford, 20; Rebs: Thomas Dowd, 11; Asts: George Kimble III, 9

Michelob Ultra Arena, Las Vegas, NV
Attendance: 4,915
Referees: Mike Littlewood, Bill Covington Jr., Owen Shortt

=== vs Notre Dame (Players Era 8 5th place game) ===
ESPN

November 19, 2026
4:00 p.m.

Notre Dame Fighting Irish vs. Auburn Tigers

Michelob Ultra Arena, Las Vegas, NV
Referees: Jeb Hartness, Bill Covington Jr., Nate Harris

== Rankings ==
Ranking movements Legend: ██ Increase in ranking ██ Decrease in ranking — = Not ranked RV = Received votes
	Week																				
Poll	Pre	1	2	3	4	5	6	7	8	9	10	11	12	13	14	15	16	17	18	19	Final
AP	RV	—	—																		
Coaches	RV	—	—																		

== See also ==
- 2026–27 Auburn Tigers women's basketball team
