= 2025–26 Auburn Tigers men's basketball team =

American college basketball season

2025–26 Auburn Tigers men's basketball

NIT, Champions
- Conference: Southeastern Conference
- Record: 22–16 (7–11 SEC)
- Head coach: Steven Pearl (1st season)
- Assistant coaches: Ira Bowman (8th season); Corey Williams (3rd season); Ian Borders (1st season); Mike Burgomaster (3rd season); Matt Gatens (1st season)
- Home arena: Neville Arena

2025–26 Southeastern Conference men's basketball standings
	Conf.				Overall
Team	W		L	PCT	W		L	PCT
No. 9 Florida	16	–	2	.889	27	–	8	.771
No. 16 Alabama	13	–	5	.722	25	–	10	.714
No. 13 Arkansas †	13	–	5	.722	28	–	9	.757
No. 19 Vanderbilt	11	–	7	.611	27	–	9	.750
No. 12 Tennessee	11	–	7	.611	25	–	12	.676
Texas A&M	11	–	7	.611	22	–	12	.647
Georgia	10	–	8	.556	22	–	11	.667
Missouri	10	–	8	.556	20	–	13	.606
Kentucky	10	–	8	.556	22	–	14	.611
No. 22 Texas	9	–	9	.500	21	–	15	.583
Oklahoma	7	–	11	.389	21	–	16	.568
Auburn	7	–	11	.389	22	–	16	.579
Mississippi State	5	–	13	.278	13	–	19	.406
South Carolina	4	–	14	.222	13	–	19	.406
Ole Miss	4	–	14	.222	15	–	20	.429
LSU	3	–	15	.167	15	–	17	.469
† 2026 SEC tournament winner Rankings from AP poll

The 2025–26 Auburn Tigers men's basketball team represented Auburn University during the 2025–26 NCAA Division I men's basketball season as a member of the Southeastern Conference. The team's head coach was Steven Pearl in his first season at Auburn. The team played its home games at Neville Arena in Auburn, Alabama.

In a surprise move on September 22, 2025, Tigers head coach Bruce Pearl, who had led the Auburn program for 11 years, announced his retirement effective immediately. The school named Pearl's son, Steven, the team's new head coach. Auburn went on to win the 2026 NIT Championship.

== Previous season ==
The Tigers finished the 2024–25 season with a record of 32–6, 15–3 in SEC play to win the regular season championship. In the SEC tournament, they defeated Ole Miss before losing to Tennessee in the semifinals. They received an at-large bid to the NCAA tournament as the No. 1 seed in the South Region. The Tigers beat Alabama State, Creighton, Michigan, and Michigan State to make the Final Four for the second time in program history. In the Final Four, Auburn was defeated by eventual national champion Florida.

On January 13, 2025, for the second time in program history, Auburn was ranked No. 1 in the AP Poll, and held the position until March 10, after consecutive losses to Texas A&M and Alabama.

== Offseason ==
=== Departures ===
Name	Number	Pos.	Height	Weight	Year	Hometown	Reason for departure
JP Pegues	1	G	6'2"	180	Senior	Nashville, TN	Graduated
Denver Jones	2	G	6'4"	205	Senior	New Market, AL	Graduated
Jahki Howard	3	F	6'6"	185	Freshman	Boston, MA	Transferred to Utah
Johni Broome	4	F/C	6'10"	240	Senior	Plant City, FL	Graduated, drafted 35th overall by the Philadelphia 76ers in 2025 NBA Draft
Chris Moore	5	F	6'6"	220	Senior	West Memphis, AR	Graduated
Ja'Heim Hudson	8	F	6'7"	230	Senior	Hinesville, GA	Graduated, signed with Español de Osorno
Chad Baker-Mazara	10	G/F	6'7"	180	Senior	Santo Domingo, Dominican Republic	Graduated, transferred to USC
Miles Kelly	13	G	6'6"	190	Senior	Stone Mountain, GA	Graduated/undrafted, signed with the Dallas Mavericks
Presley Patterson	14	G	5'11"	180	Junior	Knoxville, TN	Transferred to Rice
Addarin Scott	23	F	6'9"	220	Senior	Dallas, TX	Transferred to Kansas City
Chaney Johnson	31	F	6'7"	225	Senior	Alabaster, AL	Graduated/undrafted, signed with the Brooklyn Nets
Dylan Cardwell	44	C	6'11"	255	Grad	Augusta, GA	Graduated/undrafted, signed with the Sacramento Kings

=== Incoming transfers ===
Name	Number	Pos.	Height	Weight	Year	Hometown	Previous school
Kevin Overton	1	G/F	6'5"	200	Junior	Oklahoma City, OK	Texas Tech
KeShawn Murphy	3	F	6'10"	230	Senior	Birmingham, AL	Mississippi State
Elyjah Freeman	6	G/F	6'8"	185	Senior	Palm Beach, FL	Lincoln Memorial
Keyshawn Hall	7	F	6'7"	240	Senior	Cleveland, OH	UCF

=== 2025 recruiting class ===
College recruiting
Name	Hometown	School	Height	Weight	Commit date
Kaden Magwood #5 SG	Louisville, Kentucky	Combine Academy (NC)	6 ft 2 in (1.88 m)	175 lb (79 kg)	Nov 12, 2024
Kaden Magwood #5 SG	Recruit ratings: Rivals: 247Sports: ESPN: (87)				
Simon Walker #10 SG	Huntsville, Alabama	Huntsville (AL)	6 ft 5 in (1.96 m)	185 lb (84 kg)	Sep 26, 2024
Simon Walker #10 SG	Recruit ratings: Rivals: 247Sports: ESPN: (82)				
Sebastian Williams-Adams #33 SF	Houston, Texas	St. John's (TX)	6 ft 8 in (2.03 m)	225 lb (102 kg)	Nov 17, 2024
Sebastian Williams-Adams #33 SF	Recruit ratings: Rivals: 247Sports: ESPN: (86)				
Overall recruit ranking: Rivals: 28 247Sports: 14
Note: In many cases, Scout, Rivals, 247Sports, On3, and ESPN may conflict in their listings of height and weight.; In these cases, the average was taken. ESPN grades are on a 100-point scale.; Sources: "Auburn 2025 Basketball Commitments". Rivals.; "2025 Auburn Tigers Recruiting Class". ESPN.; "2025 Team Ranking". Rivals.

== Roster ==
2025–26 Auburn Tigers men's basketball team
Players
Coaches

Pos.	#	Name	Height	Weight	Year	Previous school	Hometown
G	0	Tahaad Pettiford	6 ft 1 in (1.85 m)	170 lb (77 kg)	So	Hudson Catholic Regional HS	Jersey City, NJ
G/F	1	Kevin Overton	6 ft 5 in (1.96 m)	200 lb (91 kg)	Jr	Texas Tech	Oklahoma City, OK
G	2	Abdul Bashir	6 ft 7 in (2.01 m)	165 lb (75 kg)	Jr	Casper College (Wyo.)	Omaha, NE
F	3	KeShawn Murphy	6 ft 10 in (2.08 m)	230 lb (104 kg)	Sr	Mississippi State	Birmingham, AL
G	5	Kaden Magwood	6 ft 2 in (1.88 m)	175 lb (79 kg)	Fr	Combine Academy (N.C.)	Louisville, KY
G/F	6	Elyjah Freeman	6 ft 8 in (2.03 m)	185 lb (84 kg)	So	Lincoln Memorial	Palm Beach, FL
F	7	Keyshawn Hall	6 ft 7 in (2.01 m)	240 lb (109 kg)	Sr	UCF	Cleveland, OH
G	10	Simon Walker	6 ft 4 in (1.93 m)	195 lb (88 kg)	Fr	Huntsville HS	Huntsville, AL
G	12	Joah Shay	5 ft 6 in (1.68 m)	135 lb (61 kg)	So	Mount Tabor HS	Winston-Salem, NC
G	13	CJ Williams	6 ft 2 in (1.88 m)	185 lb (84 kg)	Sr	Texas Tech	DeLand, FL
C	14	Emeka Opurum	7 ft 0 in (2.13 m)	205 lb (93 kg)	So	Butler CC (Kan.)	Lagos, Nigeria
G	17	Drake Cardwell	6 ft 7 in (2.01 m)	205 lb (93 kg)	Fr	Evans HS (Ga.)	Augusta, GA
G/F	20	Jeremiah Bowman	6 ft 7 in (2.01 m)	205 lb (93 kg)	Fr	Wilson Academy (Ga.)	Glassboro, NJ
G	21	Blake Muschalek	6 ft 3 in (1.91 m)	190 lb (86 kg)	Jr	Trinity Christian Academy	Dallas, TX
G	22	Reed Trapp	6 ft 6 in (1.98 m)	180 lb (82 kg)	Sr	Birmingham-Southern	Muscle Shoals, AL
G	24	Bradley Pearson	6 ft 1 in (1.85 m)	160 lb (73 kg)	So	Southern Union CC	Auburn, AL
F	33	Sebastian Williams-Adams	6 ft 8 in (2.03 m)	230 lb (104 kg)	Fr	St. John's HS	Houston, TX
F	38	Filip Jović	6 ft 8 in (2.03 m)	225 lb (102 kg)	Fr	KK Mega Basket	Bijeljina, Bosnia and Herzegovina

Head coach

- Steven Pearl (Tennessee)

Assistant coach(es)

- Ira Bowman (Penn)
- Corey Williams (Oklahoma State)
- Mike Burgomaster (Miami (FL))
- Ian Borders (Louisville)
- Matt Gatens (Iowa)

Legend

- (C) Team captain
- (S) Suspended
- (I) Ineligible
- (W) Walk-on
- Injured
- Current redshirt

Roster
Last update: August 28, 2025

== Schedule ==
Date time, TV	Rank^{#}	Opponent^{#}	Result	Record	High points	High rebounds	High assists	Site (attendance) city, state
Exhibition
October 15, 2025*; 7:00 p.m., YouTube	No. 20	vs. Oklahoma State; Ballin' in Boutwell	L 95–97 ^{OT}	–	26 – Hall	9 – Williams-Adams	3 – Tied	Boutwell Auditorium (2,471); Birmingham, AL
October 30, 2025*; 7:30 p.m., WarEagle+	No. 20	vs. Memphis	W 100–71	–	20 – Hall	6 – Freeman	5 – Pettiford	State Farm Arena (1,500); Atlanta, GA
Non-conference regular season
November 3, 2025*; 7:00 p.m., SECN+	No. 20	Bethune–Cookman	W 95–90 ^{OT}	1–0	28 – Hall	8 – Tied	5 – Pettiford	Neville Arena (9,121); Auburn, AL
November 6, 2025*; 7:00 p.m., SECN+	No. 20	Merrimack	W 95–57	2–0	25 – Hall	14 – Hall	5 – Williams-Adams	Neville Arena (9,121); Auburn, AL
November 11, 2025*; 7:00 p.m., SECN+	No. 22	Wofford	W 93–62	3–0	21 – Freeman	11 – Hall	6 – Hall	Neville Arena (9,121); Auburn, AL
November 16, 2025*; 2:00 p.m., ESPN	No. 22	vs. No. 1 Houston; The Battleground 2k25	L 72–73	3–1	20 – Hall	11 – Hall	3 – Murphy	Legacy Arena (15,623); Birmingham, AL
November 19, 2025*; 8:00 p.m., SECN	No. 22	Jackson State	W 112–66	4–1	19 – Murphy	7 – Murphy	8 – Magwood	Neville Arena (9,121); Auburn, AL
November 24, 2025*; 7:00 p.m., truTV	No. 21	vs. Oregon; Players Era Festival Game 1	W 84–73	5–1	24 – Pettiford	6 – Tied	4 – Pettiford	Michelob Ultra Arena; Las Vegas, NV
November 25, 2025*; 7:30 p.m., TNT	No. 21	vs. No. 7 Michigan; Players Era Festival Game 2	L 72–102	5–2	16 – Pettiford	6 – Tied	1 – Tied	Michelob Ultra Arena; Las Vegas, NV
November 26, 2025*; 7:00 p.m., truTV	No. 21	vs. No. 14 St. John's; Players Era Festival Consolation Game	W 85–74	6–2	27 – Pettiford	8 – Hall	5 – Overton	Michelob Ultra Arena; Las Vegas, NV
December 3, 2025*; 8:15 p.m., ESPN	No. 20	NC State; ACC–SEC Challenge	W 83–73	7–2	29 – Overton	10 – Hall	4 – Williams-Adams	Neville Arena (9,121); Auburn, AL
December 6, 2025*; 9:00 p.m., ESPN	No. 20	at No. 2 Arizona	L 68–97	7–3	30 – Pettiford	8 – Murphy	2 – Overton	McKale Memorial Center (14,688); Tucson, AZ
December 13, 2025*; 3:30 p.m., SECN	No. 21	vs. Chattanooga; Holiday Hoopsgiving	W 92–78	8–3	22 – Hall	11 – Hall	6 – Hall	State Farm Arena (1,200); Atlanta, GA
December 20, 2025*; 5:30 p.m., Peacock	No. 21	vs. No. 6 Purdue; Indy Classic	L 60–88	8–4	22 – Overton	5 – Overton	3 – Freeman	Gainbridge Fieldhouse (16,912); Indianapolis, IN
December 29, 2025*; 9:00 p.m., SECN		Queens	W 106–65	9–4	27 – Freeman	6 – Murphy	9 – Pettiford	Neville Arena (9,121); Auburn, AL
SEC regular season
January 3, 2026; 12:00 p.m., SECN		at No. 23 Georgia	L 100–104 ^{OT}	9–5 (0–1)	25 – Pettiford	10 – Jović	4 – Tied	Stegeman Coliseum (10,261); Athens, GA
January 6, 2026; 8:00 p.m., SECN		Texas A&M	L 88–90	9–6 (0–2)	32 – Hall	12 – Hall	3 – Hall	Neville Arena (9,121); Auburn, AL
January 10, 2026; 5:00 p.m., ESPN		No. 15 Arkansas	W 95–73	10–6 (1–2)	32 – Hall	10 – Murphy	7 – Pettiford	Neville Arena (9,121); Auburn, AL
January 14, 2026; 6:00 p.m., ESPN2		at Missouri	L 74–84	10–7 (1–3)	13 – Tied	9 – Hall	7 – Hall	Mizzou Arena (10,196); Columbia, MO
January 17, 2026; 5:00 p.m., SECN		South Carolina	W 71–67	11–7 (2–3)	23 – Jović	8 – Williams-Adams	5 – Pettiford	Neville Arena (9,121); Auburn, AL
January 20, 2026; 8:00 p.m., ESPNU		at Ole Miss	W 78–66	12–7 (3–3)	19 – Hall	14 – Murphy	3 – Pettiford	SJB Pavilion (9,530); Oxford, MS
January 24, 2026; 3:00 p.m., ESPN		at No. 16 Florida	W 76–67	13–7 (4–3)	24 – Hall	9 – Murphy	4 – Hall	O'Connell Center (11,104); Gainesville, FL
January 28, 2026; 6:00 p.m., ESPN2		Texas	W 88–82	14–7 (5–3)	31 – Hall	5 – Murphy	3 – Pettiford	Neville Arena (9,121); Auburn, AL
January 31, 2026; 7:30 p.m., ESPN		at Tennessee	L 69–77	14–8 (5–4)	21 – Hall	7 – Tied	7 – Pettiford	Thompson-Boling Arena (21,678); Knoxville, TN
February 7, 2026; 3:00 p.m., ESPN2		Alabama; Rivalry	L 92–96	14–9 (5–5)	25 – Pettiford	12 – Murphy	7 – Pettiford	Neville Arena (9,121); Auburn, AL
February 10, 2026; 6:00 p.m., SECN		No. 19 Vanderbilt	L 76–84	14–10 (5–6)	21 – Pettiford	8 – Freeman	4 – Pettiford	Neville Arena (9,121); Auburn, AL
February 14, 2026; 7:30 p.m., ESPN		at No. 21 Arkansas	L 75–88	14–11 (5–7)	29 – Pettiford	12 – Murphy	7 – Pettiford	Bud Walton Arena (19,200); Fayetteville, AR
February 18, 2026; 8:00 p.m., ESPN2		at Mississippi State	L 85–91	14–12 (5–8)	29 – Hall	11 – Murphy	4 – Pettiford	Humphrey Coliseum (7,789); Starkville, MS
February 21, 2026; 7:30 p.m., ESPN		Kentucky	W 75–74	15–12 (6–8)	25 – Murphy	10 – Murphy	7 – Hall	Neville Arena (9,121); Auburn, AL
February 24, 2026; 8:00 p.m., ESPNU		at Oklahoma	L 79–91	15–13 (6–9)	26 – Overton	8 – Jović	3 – Jović	Lloyd Noble Center (5,922); Norman, OK
February 28, 2026; 7:30 p.m., SECN		Ole Miss	L 79–85	15–14 (6–10)	24 – Pettiford	6 – Tied	3 – Pettiford	Neville Arena (9,121); Auburn, AL
March 3, 2026; 9:00 p.m., SECN		LSU	W 88–74	16–14 (7–10)	27 – Pettiford	6 – Hall	6 – Pettiford	Neville Arena (9,121); Auburn, AL
March 7, 2026; 7:30 p.m., ESPN		at No. 16 Alabama; Rivalry	L 84–96	16–15 (7–11)	24 – Overton	6 – Hall	4 – Pettiford	Coleman Coliseum (13,474); Tuscaloosa, AL
SEC Tournament
March 11, 2026; 2:00 p.m., SECN	(12)	vs. (13) Mississippi State; First round	W 79–61	17–15	22 – Overton	10 – Freeman	5 – Tied	Bridgestone Arena (12,722); Nashville, TN
March 12, 2026; 2:00 p.m., SECN	(12)	vs. (5) No. 25 Tennessee; Second round	L 62–72	17–16	28 – Pettiford	7 – Williams-Adams	2 – Murphy	Bridgestone Arena (15,719); Nashville, TN
NIT
March 17, 2026*; 9:00 p.m., ESPN2	(1 AU)	South Alabama; First round	W 78–67	18–16	21 – Tied	10 – Freeman	4 – Tied	Neville Arena (2,169); Auburn, AL
March 22, 2026*; 5:30 p.m., ESPN2	(1 AU)	(4 AU) Seattle; Second round	W 91–85	19–16	23 – Overton	15 – Hall	5 – Hall	Neville Arena (3,672); Auburn, AL
March 25, 2026*; 8:00 p.m., ESPN2	(1 AU)	(2 AU) Nevada; Quarterfinal	W 75–69	20–16	18 – Jović	9 – Jović	6 – Pettiford	Neville Arena (2,756); Auburn, AL
April 2, 2026*; 8:30 p.m., ESPN	(1 AU)	vs. (4 W-S) Illinois State; Semifinal	W 88–66	21–16	24 – Hall	6 – Hall	5 – Pettiford	Hinkle Fieldhouse (4,625); Indianapolis, IN
April 5, 2026*; 7:00 p.m., ESPN2	(1 AU)	vs. (1 T) Tulsa; Championship	W 92–86 ^{OT}	22–16	26 – Overton	14 – Freeman	8 – Pettiford	Gainbridge Fieldhouse (9,670); Indianapolis, IN
*Non-conference game. ^{#}Rankings from AP Poll. (#) Tournament seedings in parentheses. AU=Auburn W-S=Winston-Salem T=Tulsa. All times are in Central Time.

== Exhibitions ==
=== vs Oklahoma State ===
YouTube

October 15, 2025
7:00 p.m.

Recap

Oklahoma State Cowboys 97, No. 20 Auburn Tigers 95 (OT)
Scoring by half: 43–42, 42–43 Overtime: 12–10
Pts: Tied, 28; Rebs: Anthony Roy, 12; Asts: Jaylen Curry, 4	Pts: Keyshawn Hall, 26; Rebs: Sebastian Williams-Adams, 9 Asts: Tied, 3

Boutwell Auditorium, Birmingham, AL
Attendance: 2,471
Referees: Joe Lindsay, Vladimir Voyard-Tadal, Jeb Hartness

=== vs Memphis ===
WarEagle+

October 30, 2025
7:30 p.m.

Recap

Memphis Tigers 71, No. 20 Auburn Tigers 100
Scoring by half: 27–52, 44–48
Pts: Sincere Parker, 19; Rebs: Simon Majok, 7 Asts: Julius Thedford, 3	Pts: Keyshawn Hall, 20; Rebs: Elyjah Freeman, 6 Asts: Tahaad Pettiford, 5

State Farm Arena, Atlanta, GA
Attendance: 1,500
Referees: Don Daily, K.B. Burdett Jr., Steven Anderson

== Game summaries ==
=== Bethune–Cookman ===
SECN+

November 3, 2025
7:00 p.m.

Recap

Bethune–Cookman Wildcats 90, No. 20 Auburn Tigers 95 (OT)
Scoring by half: 37–38, 44–43 Overtime: 9–14
Pts: Arterio Morris, 20; Rebs: Arterio Morris, 10; Asts: Seneca Willoughby, 4	Pts: Keyshawn Hall, 28; Rebs: Tied, 8 Asts: Tahaad Pettiford, 5

Neville Arena, Auburn, AL
Attendance: 9,121
Referees: Doug Shows, Anthony Jordan, Shane Land

=== Merrimack ===
SECN+

November 6, 2025
7:00 p.m.

Recap

Merrimack Warriors 57, No. 20 Auburn Tigers 95
Scoring by half: 22–39, 35–56
Pts: Ernest Shelton, 23; Rebs: Tied, 4 Asts: Todd Brogna, 3	Pts: Keyshawn Hall, 25; Rebs: Keyshawn Hall, 14; Asts: Sebastian Williams-Adams, 5

Neville Arena, Auburn, AL
Attendance: 9,121
Referees: Steven Anderson, Vladimir Voyard-Tadal, Chris Ford

=== Wofford ===
SECN+

November 11, 2025
7:00 p.m.

Recap

Wofford Terriers 62, No. 22 Auburn Tigers 93
Scoring by half: 22–40, 40–53
Pts: Chace Watley, 11; Rebs: Luke Flynn, 6 Asts: Nils Machowski, 5	Pts: Elyjah Freeman, 21; Rebs: Keyshawn Hall, 11; Asts: Keyshawn Hall, 6

Neville Arena, Auburn, AL
Attendance: 9,121
Referees: Bart Lenox, Owen Shortt, Bharat Ramnanan

=== vs No. 1 Houston ===
ESPN

November 16, 2025
2:00 p.m.

Recap

No. 1 Houston Cougars 73, No. 22 Auburn Tigers 72
Scoring by half: 39–35, 34–37
Pts: Kingston Flemings, 22; Rebs: Chris Cenac Jr., 9 Asts: Kingston Flemings, 7	Pts: Keyshawn Hall, 20; Rebs: Keyshawn Hall, 11; Asts: KeShawn Murphy, 3

Legacy Arena, Birmingham, AL
Attendance: 15,623
Referees: Don Daily, Ron Groover, Marques Pettigrew

=== Jackson State ===
SECN

November 19, 2025
8:00 p.m.

Recap

Jackson State Tigers 66, No. 22 Auburn Tigers 112
Scoring by half: 24–55, 42–57
Pts: Jayme Mitchell Jr., 24; Rebs: Ebo Wilson, 8 Asts: Daeshun Ruffin, 4	Pts: KeShawn Murphy, 19; Rebs: KeShawn Murphy, 7 Asts: Kaden Magwood, 8

Neville Arena, Auburn, AL
Attendance: 9,121
Referees: Pat Adams, Jason Baker, Michael Roberts

=== vs Oregon (Players Era Festival Game 1) ===
truTV

November 24, 2025
7:00 p.m.

Recap

No. 21 Auburn Tigers 84, Oregon Ducks 73
Scoring by half: 37–37, 47–36
Pts: Tahaad Pettiford, 24; Rebs: Tied, 6 Asts: Tahaad Pettiford, 4	Pts: Takai Simpkins, 22; Rebs: Devon Pryor, 10; Asts: Jackson Shelstad, 8

Michelob Ultra Arena, Las Vegas, NV
Referees: Paul Szelc, Byron Jarrett, Justin Shamion

=== vs No. 7 Michigan (Players Era Festival Game 2) ===
TNT

November 25, 2025
7:30 p.m.

Recap

No. 21 Auburn Tigers 72, No. 7 Michigan Wolverines 102
Scoring by half: 31–59, 41–43
Pts: Tahaad Pettiford, 16; Rebs: Tied, 6 Asts: Tied, 1	Pts: Tied, 17; Rebs: Aday Mara, 8 Asts: Yaxel Lendeborg, 4

Michelob Ultra Arena, Las Vegas, NV
Referees: Keith Kimble, Don Daily, Bret Smith

=== vs No. 14 St. John's (Players Era Festival Consolation Game) ===
truTV

November 26, 2025
7:00 p.m.

Recap

No. 14 St. John's Red Storm 74, No. 21 Auburn Tigers 85
Scoring by half: 39–30, 35–55
Pts: Zuby Ejiofor, 24; Rebs: Bryce Hopkins, 7 Asts: Dillon Mitchell, 4	Pts: Tahaad Pettiford, 27; Rebs: Keyshawn Hall, 8 Asts: Kevin Overton, 5

Michelob Ultra Arena, Las Vegas, NV
Referees: Paul Szelc, Brian O'Connell, Byron Jarrett

=== NC State ===
ESPN

December 3, 2025
8:15 p.m.

Recap

NC State Wolfpack 73, No. 20 Auburn Tigers 83
Scoring by half: 35–41, 38–42
Pts: Quadir Copeland, 22; Rebs: Paul McNeil Jr., 4 Asts: Tre Holloman, 4	Pts: Kevin Overton, 29; Rebs: Keyshawn Hall, 10; Asts: Sebastian Williams-Adams, 4

Neville Arena, Auburn, AL
Attendance: 9,121
Referees: Bart Lenox, Courtney Green, Vladimir Voyard-Tadal

=== at No. 2 Arizona ===
ESPN

December 6, 2025
9:00 p.m.

Recap

No. 20 Auburn Tigers 68, No. 2 Arizona Wildcats 97
Scoring by half: 32–44, 36–53
Pts: Tahaad Pettiford, 30; Rebs: KeShawn Murphy, 8 Asts: Kevin Overton, 2	Pts: Koa Peat, 18; Rebs: Motiejus Krivas, 9 Asts: Ivan Kharchenkov, 8

McKale Memorial Center, Tucson, AZ
Attendance: 14,688
Referees: Doug Sirmons, Tony Padilla, Byron Jarrett

=== vs Chattanooga ===
SECN

December 13, 2025
3:30 p.m.

Recap

Chattanooga Mocs 78, No. 21 Auburn Tigers 92
Scoring by half: 38–43, 40–49
Pts: Jordan Frison, 20; Rebs: Tied, 4 Asts: Jordan Frison, 6	Pts: Keyshawn Hall, 22; Rebs: Keyshawn Hall, 11; Asts: Keyshawn Hall, 6

State Farm Arena, Atlanta, GA
Attendance: 1,200
Referees: Anthony Jordan, Wil Howard, Chris Ford

=== vs No. 6 Purdue ===
Peacock

December 20, 2025
5:30 p.m.

Recap

No. 21 Auburn Tigers 60, No. 6 Purdue Boilermakers 88
Scoring by half: 32–46, 28–42
Pts: Kevin Overton, 22; Rebs: Kevin Overton, 5 Asts: Elyjah Freeman, 3	Pts: Trey Kaufman-Renn, 18; Rebs: Oscar Cluff, 7 Asts: Braden Smith, 14

Gainbridge Fieldhouse, Indianapolis, IN
Attendance: 16,912
Referees: DJ Carstensen, Bart Lenox, Owen Shortt

=== Queens ===
SECN

December 29, 2025
9:00 p.m.

Recap

Queens Royals 65, Auburn Tigers 106
Scoring by half: 21–57, 44–49
Pts: Nasir Mann, 13; Rebs: Gus Larson, 4 Asts: Tied, 2	Pts: Elyjah Freeman, 27; Rebs: KeShawn Murphy, 6 Asts: Tahaad Pettiford, 9

Neville Arena, Auburn, AL
Attendance: 9,121
Referees: Joe Lindsay, Michael Roberts, Lucas Santos

=== at No. 23 Georgia ===
SECN

January 3, 2026
12:00 p.m.

Recap

Auburn Tigers 100, No. 23 Georgia Bulldogs 104 (OT)
Scoring by half: 42–47, 50–45 Overtime: 8–12
Pts: Tahaad Pettiford, 25; Rebs: Filip Jović, 10; Asts: Tied, 4	Pts: Jeremiah Wilkinson, 31; Rebs: Tied, 6 Asts: Tied, 3

Stegeman Coliseum, Athens, GA
Attendance: 10,261
Referees: Bart Lenox, Chuck Jones, Patrick Evans

=== Texas A&M ===
SECN

January 6, 2026
8:00 p.m.

Recap

Texas A&M Aggies 90, Auburn Tigers 88
Scoring by half: 37–47, 53–41
Pts: Pop Isaacs, 21; Rebs: Tied, 7 Asts: Pop Isaacs, 5	Pts: Keyshawn Hall, 32; Rebs: Keyshawn Hall, 12; Asts: Keyshawn Hall, 3

Neville Arena, Auburn, AL
Attendance: 9,121
Referees: Courtney Green, Byron Jarrett, Todd Austin

=== No. 15 Arkansas ===
ESPN

January 10, 2026
5:00 p.m.

Recap

No. 15 Arkansas Razorbacks 73, Auburn Tigers 95
Scoring by half: 34–49, 39–46
Pts: Darius Acuff Jr., 19; Rebs: Malique Ewin, 12; Asts: Meleek Thomas, 4	Pts: Keyshawn Hall, 32; Rebs: KeShawn Murphy, 10; Asts: Tahaad Pettiford, 7

Neville Arena, Auburn, AL
Attendance: 9,121
Referees: Don Daily, Steven Anderson, Anthony Jordan

=== at Missouri ===
ESPN2

January 14, 2026
6:00 p.m.

Recap

Auburn Tigers 74, Missouri Tigers 84
Scoring by half: 34–38, 40–46
Pts: Tied, 13; Rebs: Keyshawn Hall, 9 Asts: Keyshawn Hall, 7	Pts: Jayden Stone, 22; Rebs: Jayden Stone, 6 Asts: Mark Mitchell, 5

Mizzou Arena, Columbia, MO
Attendance: 10,196
Referees: K.B. Burdett Jr., Owen Shortt, Vladimir Voyard-Tadal

=== South Carolina ===
SECN

January 17, 2026
5:00 p.m.

Recap

South Carolina Gamecocks 67, Auburn Tigers 71
Scoring by half: 24–30, 43–41
Pts: Meechie Johnson, 17; Rebs: Tied, 9 Asts: Meechie Johnson, 6	Pts: Filip Jović, 23; Rebs: Sebastian Williams-Adams, 8 Asts: Tahaad Pettiford, 5

Neville Arena, Auburn, AL
Attendance: 9,121
Referees: Jeb Hartness, Mike Nance, Garrick Shannon

=== at Ole Miss ===
ESPNU

January 20, 2026
8:00 p.m.

Recap

Auburn Tigers 78, Ole Miss Rebels 66
Scoring by half: 28–27, 50–39
Pts: Keyshawn Hall, 19; Rebs: KeShawn Murphy, 14; Asts: Tahaad Pettiford, 3	Pts: AJ Storr, 18; Rebs: Tied, 5 Asts: AJ Storr, 4

SJB Pavilion, Oxford, MS
Attendance: 9,530
Referees: Doug Shows, Chuck Jones, Wil Howard

=== at No. 16 Florida ===
ESPN

January 24, 2026
3:00 p.m.

Recap

Auburn Tigers 76, No. 16 Florida Gators 67
Scoring by half: 43–28, 33–39
Pts: Keyshawn Hall, 24; Rebs: KeShawn Murphy, 9 Asts: Keyshawn Hall, 4	Pts: Thomas Haugh, 27; Rebs: Thomas Haugh, 10; Asts: Boogie Fland, 5

O'Connell Center, Gainesville, FL
Attendance: 11,104
Referees: Pat Adams, Olandis Poole, Lucas Santos

=== Texas ===
ESPN2

January 28, 2026
6:00 p.m.

Recap

Texas Longhorns 82, Auburn Tigers 88
Scoring by half: 42–34, 40–54
Pts: Dailyn Swain, 30; Rebs: Dailyn Swain, 7 Asts: Dailyn Swain, 4	Pts: Keyshawn Hall, 31; Rebs: KeShawn Murphy, 5 Asts: Tahaad Pettiford, 3

Neville Arena, Auburn, AL
Attendance: 9,121
Referees: Courtney Green, Steven Anderson, Vladimir Voyard-Tadal

=== at Tennessee ===
ESPN

January 31, 2026
7:30 p.m.

Recap

Auburn Tigers 69, Tennessee Volunteers 77
Scoring by half: 31–41, 38–36
Pts: Nate Ament, 22; Rebs: Tied, 8 Asts: Ja'Kobi Gillespie, 5	Pts: Keyshawn Hall, 21; Rebs: Tied, 7 Asts: Tahaad Pettiford, 7

Thompson-Boling Arena, Knoxville, TN
Attendance: 21,678
Referees: Joe Lindsay, Bart Lenox, Jeb Hartness

=== Alabama ===
ESPN2

February 7, 2026
3:00 p.m.

Recap

Alabama Crimson Tide 96, Auburn Tigers 92
Scoring by half: 37-41, 59-51
Pts: Labaron Philon, 25; Rebs: Amari Allen, 6 Asts: Labaron Philon, 6	Pts: Tahaad Pettiford, 25; Rebs: KeShawn Murphy, 12; Asts: Tahaad Pettiford, 7

Neville Arena, Auburn, AL
Attendance: 9,121
Referees: Doug Shows, Owen Shortt, Vladimir Voyard-Tadal

=== Vanderbilt ===
SECN

February 10, 2026
6:00 p.m.

Recap

Vanderbilt Commodores 84, Auburn Tigers 76
Scoring by half: 42-31, 42-45
Pts: Tyler Tanner, 25; Rebs: Devin McGlockton, 7 Asts: Tyler Tanner, 6	Pts: Tahaad Pettiford, 21; Rebs: Elyjah Freeman, 8 Asts: Tahhad Pettiford, 4

Neville Arena, Auburn, AL
Attendance: 9,121
Referees: Pat Adams, Keith Kimble, Chuck Jones

=== at Arkansas ===
ESPN

February 14, 2026
7:30 p.m.

Recap

Auburn Tigers 75, Arkansas Razorbacks 88
Scoring by half: 32-38, 43-50
Pts: Tahaad Pettiford 29; Rebs: KeShawn Murphy 12; Asts: Tahaad Pettiford 7	Pts: Darius Acuff Jr. 31; Rebs: Meleek Thomas 10; Asts: Darius Acuff Jr. 7

Bud Walton Arena, Fayetteville, AR
Attendance: 19,200
Referees: Joe Lindsay, Olandis Poole, K.B. Burdett Jr.

=== at Mississippi State ===
ESPN2

February 18, 2026
8:00 p.m.

Recap

Auburn Tigers 85, Mississippi State Bulldogs 91
Scoring by half: 33-49, 52-42
Pts: Keyshawn Hall 29; Rebs: KeShawn Murphy 11; Asts: Tahaad Pettiford 4	Pts: Josh Hubbard 46; Rebs: Josh Hubbard 9 Asts: Shawn Jones Jr. 5

Humphrey Coliseum, Starkville, MS
Attendance: 7,789
Referees: Steven Anderson, Bart Lenox, Owen Shortt

=== Kentucky ===
ESPN

February 21, 2026
7:30 p.m.

Recap

Kentucky Wildcats 74, Auburn Tigers 75
Scoring by half: 39-35, 35-40
Pts: Otega Oweh 29; Rebs: Otega Oweh, Malachi Moreno 7 Asts: Malachi Moreno 4	Pts: KeShawn Murphy 25; Rebs: KeShawn Murphy 10; Asts: Keyshawn Hall 7

Neville Arena, Auburn, AL
Attendance: 9,121
Referees: Todd Austin, Courtney Green, Lucas Santos

=== at Oklahoma ===
ESPNU

February 24, 2025
8:00 p.m.

Recap

Auburn Tigers 79, Oklahoma Sooners 91
Scoring by half: 42-51, 37-40
Pts: Kevin Overton, Keyshawn Hall 26; Rebs: Filip Jovic 8 Asts: Tahaad Pettiford, Filip Jovic 3	Pts: Nijel Pack 22; Rebs: Mohamed Wague 9 Asts: Xzayvier Brown 4

Lloyd Noble Center, Norman, OK
Attendance: 5,922
Referees: Byron Jarrett, Joe Lindsay, Wil Howard

=== Ole Miss ===
SECN

February 28, 2025
7:30 p.m.

Recap

Ole Miss Rebels 85, Auburn Tigers 79
Scoring by half: 38-37, 47-42
Pts: AJ Storr, Patton Pinkins 26; Rebs: Eduardo Klafke 8 Asts: Koren Johnson 4	Pts: Tahaad Pettiford 24; Rebs: Elyjah Freeman, Keyshawn Hall 6 Asts: Tahaad Pettiford 3

Neville Arena, Auburn, AL
Attendance: 9,121
Referees: Steven Anderson, Josue Nieves, K.B. Burdett Jr.

=== LSU ===
SECN

March 3, 2026
9:00 p.m.

Recap

LSU Tigers 74, Auburn Tigers 88
Scoring by half: 34-41, 40-47
Pts: Mike Nwoko 19; Rebs: Pablo Tamba 9 Asts: Jalen Reece 6	Pts: Tahaad Pettiford 27; Rebs: Elyjah Freeman, Keyshawn Hall 6 Asts: Tahaad Pettiford 6

Neville Arena, Auburn, AL
Attendance: 9,121
Referees: Brian Dorsey, Bart Lenox, Olandis Poole

=== at Alabama ===
ESPN

March 7, 2026
7:30 p.m.

Recap

Auburn Tigers 84, Alabama Crimson Tide 96
Scoring by half: 31-50, 53-46
Pts: Kevin Overton 24; Rebs: KeShawn Murphy, Keyshawn Hall 6 Asts: Tahaad Pettiford 4	Pts: Labaron Philon Jr., Aden Holloway 21; Rebs: Latrell Wrightsell, Houston Mallette 7 Asts: Labaron Philon Jr. 4

Coleman Coliseum, Tuscaloosa, AL
Attendance: 13,474
Referees: Chuck Jones, Byron Jarrett, Courtney Green

=== vs. Mississippi State (SEC Tournament - first round) ===
SEC Network

March 11, 2026
2:15 p.m.

Recap

Mississippi State Bulldogs 61, Auburn Tigers 79
Scoring by half: 33-30, 28-49
Pts: Josh Hubbard 22; Rebs: Quincy Ballard, Achor Achor 8 Asts: Josh Hubbard 3	Pts: Kevin Overton 22; Rebs: Elyjah Freeman 10; Asts: Tahaad Pettiford, Kevin Overton 5

Bridgestone Arena, Nashville, TN
Attendance: 12,722
Referees: Vladimir Voyard-Tadal, Courtney Green, Carlos Santos

=== vs. Tennessee (SEC Tournament - second round) ===
SEC Network

March 12, 2026
2:25 p.m.

Recap

Auburn Tigers 62, Tennessee Volunteers 72
Scoring by half: 32-25, 30-47
Pts: Tahaad Pettiford 28; Rebs: Sebastian Williams-Adams 7 Asts: KeShawn Murphy 2	Pts: Nate Ament 27; Rebs: Nate Ament 8 Asts: Nate Ament 4

Bridgestone Arena, Nashville, TN
Attendance: 15,729
Referees: Chuck Jones, Joe Lindsay, Vladimir Voyard-Tadal

=== vs. South Alabama (NIT - first round) ===
ESPN2

March 17, 2026
10:05 p.m.

Recap

South Alabama Jaguars 67, Auburn Tigers 78
Scoring by half: 36-31, 30-48
Pts: Chaze Harris, 29; Rebs: Stephen Williams, 9 Asts: Chaze Harris, 6	Pts: Tied, 21; Rebs: Elyjah Freeman, 10; Asts: Tied, 4

Neville Arena, Auburn, AL
Attendance: 2,169
Referees: Chris Ford, Hunter Allen, R.B. Clyburn

=== vs. Seattle (NIT - second round) ===
ESPN2

March 22, 2026
6:30 p.m.

Recap

Seattle Redhawks 85, Auburn Tigers 91
Scoring by half: 31-54, 42-49
Pts: Brayden Maldonado, 25; Rebs: Jun Seok Yeo, 6 Asts: Brayden Maldonado, 5	Pts: Kevin Overton, 23; Rebs: Keyshawn Hall, 15; Asts: Keyshawn Hall, 5

Neville Arena, Auburn, AL
Attendance: 3,672
Referees: Landon Brandes, Shane Land, Erroll Lewis

=== vs. Nevada (NIT - quarterfinal) ===
ESPN2

March 25, 2026
9:00 p.m.

Recap

Nevada Wolf Pack 69, Auburn Tigers 75
Scoring by half: 26-43, 38-37
Pts: Elijah Price, 22; Rebs: Elijah Price, 11; Asts: Tayshawn Comer, 6	Pts: Filip Jović, 18; Rebs: Filip Jović, 9 Asts: Tahaad Pettiford, 6

Neville Arena, Auburn, AL
Attendance: 2,756
Referees: Rob Rorke, Josue Nieves, Bharat Ramnanan

=== vs. Illinois State (NIT - semifinal) ===
ESPN

April 2, 2026
9:47 p.m.

Recap

Illinois State Redbirds 66, Auburn Tigers 88
Scoring by half: 38-28, 51-37
Pts: Tyreek Coleman, 17; Rebs: Chase Walker, 7 Asts: Boden Skunberg, 4	Pts: Keyshawn Hall, 24; Rebs: Keyshawn Hall, 6 Asts: Tahaad Pettiford, 5

Hinkle Fieldhouse, Indianapolis, IN
Attendance: 4,625
Referees: Bret Smith, William Covington, Todd Austin

=== vs. Tulsa (NIT - final) ===
ESPN2

April 5, 2026
8:00 p.m.

Recap

Tulsa Golden Hurricane 86, Auburn Tigers 92 (OT)
Scoring by half: 31-47, 48-30 Overtime: 8-14
Pts: David Green, 25; Rebs: Tied, 6 Asts: Tylen Riley, 3	Pts: Kevin Overton, 26; Rebs: Elyjah Freeman, 14; Asts: Tahaad Pettiford, 8

Gainbridge Fieldhouse, Indianapolis, IN
Attendance: 9,670
Referees: Bart Lenox, Brooks Wells, Randy Richardson

== Rankings ==
Ranking movements Legend: ██ Increase in ranking ██ Decrease in ranking — = Not ranked RV = Received votes
	Week																				
Poll	Pre	1	2	3	4	5	6	7	8	9	10	11	12	13	14	15	16	17	18	19	Final
AP	20	22	22	21	20	21	21	RV	RV*	RV	RV	—	RV	RV	RV	—	—	—	—	—	RV
Coaches	22	25	RV	25	24	24	24	RV	RV	—	—	—	—	—	—	—	—	—	—	—	—

*AP did not release a week 8 poll.

== See also ==
- 2025–26 Auburn Tigers women's basketball team
