= 2026–27 Vanderbilt Commodores men's basketball team =

American college basketball season

2026–27 Vanderbilt Commodores men's basketball
- Conference: Southeastern Conference

Ranking
- Coaches: No. 16
- AP: No. 15
- Record: 6–0 (0–0 SEC)
- Head coach: Mark Byington (3rd season)
- Assistant coaches: Rick Ray; Rodney Terry; Xavier Joyner; Joel Justus; Matt Bucklin Andy Farrell
- Home arena: Memorial Gymnasium

2026–27 Southeastern Conference men's basketball standings
	Conf.				Overall
Team	W		L	PCT	W		L	PCT
Georgia	0	–	0	–	6	–	0	1.000
Texas A&M	0	–	0	–	6	–	0	1.000
No. 15 Vanderbilt	0	–	0	–	6	–	0	1.000
No. 16 Alabama	0	–	0	–	5	–	0	1.000
No. 25 LSU	0	–	0	–	5	–	0	1.000
South Carolina	0	–	0	–	5	–	0	1.000
No. 14 Tennessee	0	–	0	–	5	–	0	1.000
No. 6 Texas	0	–	0	–	5	–	0	1.000
Ole Miss	0	–	0	–	4	–	0	1.000
No. 1 Florida	0	–	0	–	6	–	1	.857
Mississippi State	0	–	0	–	5	–	1	.833
Missouri	0	–	0	–	5	–	1	.833
Oklahoma	0	–	0	–	4	–	1	.800
No. 20 Arkansas	0	–	0	–	4	–	2	.667
Kentucky	0	–	0	–	4	–	2	.667
Auburn	0	–	0	–	3	–	3	.500
† 2027 SEC tournament winner As of November 22, 2026; Rankings from AP poll

The 2026–27 Vanderbilt Commodores men's basketball team represents Vanderbilt University during the 2026–27 NCAA Division I men's basketball season. The Commodores, led by third-year head coach Mark Byington, play their home games at Memorial Gymnasium in Nashville, Tennessee, as a member of the Southeastern Conference.

== Previous season ==
The Commodores finished the 2025–26 season 27–9, 11–7 in SEC play, and won the Battle 4 Atlantis. As the No. 4 seed in the SEC tournament, they defeated Tennessee and top-seeded Florida before losing to Arkansas in the championship game. They received an at-large bid to the NCAA tournament as the No. 5 seed in the South Region, where they defeated McNeese 78–68 in the first round before losing to Nebraska 74–72 in the second round.

== Offseason ==
=== Coaching changes ===
In April 2026, Byington added former Texas head coach Rodney Terry and Joel Justus, who had spent the previous two seasons on the staff at Ohio State, as assistant coaches.

=== Roster turnover ===
On May 27, 2026, Tyler Tanner, who averaged 19.5 points and 5.1 assists per game and set the program's single-season records for assists and steals, withdrew from the 2026 NBA draft and returned for his junior season. Thirteen players from the 2025–26 team did not return, leaving three returning players. Mike James, Frankie Collins, Tyler Harris, George Kimble III and Jaylon Dean-Vines entered the transfer portal, and Jalen Washington transferred to in-state rival Tennessee.

Vanderbilt brought in five transfers: Berke Büyüktuncel from Nebraska, Ace Glass, who averaged 16.4 points per game as a freshman at Washington State, Bangot Dak from Colorado, Sebastian Williams-Adams from Auburn and T.O. Barrett from Missouri.

=== Departures ===
Vanderbilt departures
Name	Number	Pos.	Height	Weight	Year	Hometown	Reason for Departure
Mike James	0	G/F	6'5"	205	Junior	Orlando, Florida	Entered transfer portal
Frankie Collins	1	G	6'1"	193	Graduate Student	Sacramento, California	Entered transfer portal
Duke Miles	2	G	6'2"	188	Graduate Student	Montgomery, Alabama	Graduated
Tyler Nickel	5	G/F	6'7"	222	Senior	Harrisonburg, Virginia	Graduated
Tyler Harris	8	G	6'7"	207	Junior	Hayward, California	Entered transfer portal
George Kimble III	9	G	6'2"	192	Junior	Tampa, Florida	Entered transfer portal
AK Okereke	10	F	6'7"	245	Graduate Student	Clovis, California	Graduated
Jaylon Dean-Vines	12	G	6'4"	182	Freshman	Dallas, Texas	Entered transfer portal
Jalen Washington	13	F	6'10"	245	Senior	Gary, Indiana	Transferred to Tennessee
Coleson Messer	15	G	6'4"	205	RS Sophomore	Dallas, Texas	Left the program
Miles Keeffe	25	G	6'5"	205	Senior	Novato, California	Graduated
Mason Nicholson	50	C	6'10"	288	Graduate Student	Gary, Indiana	Graduated
Devin McGlockton	99	F	6'8"	230	Senior	Cumming, Georgia	Graduated

=== Incoming transfers ===
Vanderbilt incoming transfers
Name	Number	Pos.	Height	Weight	Year	Hometown	Previous School
T.O. Barrett	5	G	6'6"	215	Junior	Oklahoma City, Oklahoma	Missouri
Bangot Dak	8	F	6'11"	210	Senior	Lincoln, Nebraska	Colorado
Berke Büyüktuncel	9	C	6'10"	260	Senior	Bursa, Turkey	Nebraska
Ace Glass	21	G	6'3"	200	Sophomore	Rancho Cucamonga, California	Washington State
Sebastian Williams-Adams	33	F	6'9"	251	Sophomore	Houston, Texas	Auburn

=== 2026 recruiting class ===
Vanderbilt 2026 recruiting class
Name	Number	Pos.	Height	Weight	Hometown	High school
Ant Brown Jr.	0	G	6'3"	190	Forestville, Maryland	Archbishop Carroll
Gabe Nesmith	1	F	6'6"	201	Palm Beach, Florida	Overtime Elite
Ethan Mgbako	2	F	6'6"	210	Franklin, New Jersey	Oak Hill Academy
Mavrick Hawkins	11	G	6'3"	195	Kansas City, Missouri	Pembroke Hill School
Chase Byington	12	G	6'5"	185	Nashville, Tennessee	Ensworth School
Baylor Allen	24	G	5'11"	160	Murfreesboro, Tennessee	Providence Christian Academy
Jackson Sheffield	35	F	6'10"	241	Hoover, Alabama	Hoover HS

== Preseason ==
On October 12, 2026, the SEC released its preseason media poll. Vanderbilt was picked to finish sixth in the conference, and Tanner was named to the preseason All-SEC first team. The league's coaches also named Tanner to their preseason first team. Tanner was also a preseason first-team All-American for the Associated Press, CBS Sports and ESPN, and was named to the watch lists for the Bob Cousy Award and the NABC Player of the Year. The Commodores began the season ranked No. 24 in the AP poll and No. 21 in the Coaches Poll, their first preseason ranking since 2015–16.

=== Preseason rankings ===
SEC Preseason Media Poll
Place	Team
1	Florida
2	Texas
3	Arkansas
4	Tennessee
5	Alabama
6	Vanderbilt
7	Kentucky
8	Missouri
9	Texas A&M
10	Auburn
11	Georgia
12	Oklahoma
13	Ole Miss
14	LSU
15	Mississippi State
16	South Carolina

== Roster ==
2026–27 Vanderbilt Commodores men's basketball team
Players
Coaches

Pos.	#	Name	Height	Weight	Year	Previous school	Hometown
G	0	Ant Brown Jr.	6 ft 3 in (1.91 m)	190 lb (86 kg)	Fr	Archbishop Carroll	Forestville, MD
F	1	Gabe Nesmith	6 ft 6 in (1.98 m)	201 lb (91 kg)	Fr	Overtime Elite	Palm Beach, FL
F	2	Ethan Mgbako	6 ft 6 in (1.98 m)	210 lb (95 kg)	Fr	Oak Hill Academy	Franklin, NJ
G	3	Tyler Tanner	6 ft 0 in (1.83 m)	181 lb (82 kg)	Jr	Brentwood Academy	Brentwood, TN
G	5	T.O. Barrett	6 ft 6 in (1.98 m)	215 lb (98 kg)	Jr	Link Academy; Missouri	Oklahoma City, OK
F	7	Chandler Bing	6 ft 6 in (1.98 m)	215 lb (98 kg)	So	Pace Academy	Atlanta, GA
F	8	Bangot Dak	6 ft 11 in (2.11 m)	210 lb (95 kg)	Sr	Lincoln Southeast; Colorado	Lincoln, NE
C	9	Berke Büyüktuncel	6 ft 10 in (2.08 m)	260 lb (118 kg)	Sr	Nebraska	Bursa, Turkey
G	11	Mavrick Hawkins	6 ft 3 in (1.91 m)	195 lb (88 kg)	Fr	Pembroke Hill School	Kansas City, MO
G	12	Chase Byington	6 ft 5 in (1.96 m)	185 lb (84 kg)	Fr	Ensworth School	Nashville, TN
G	21	Ace Glass	6 ft 3 in (1.91 m)	200 lb (91 kg)	So	Rancho Cucamonga HS; Washington State	Rancho Cucamonga, CA
G	24	Baylor Allen	5 ft 11 in (1.8 m)	160 lb (73 kg)	Fr	Providence Christian Academy	Murfreesboro, TN
F	33	Sebastian Williams-Adams	6 ft 9 in (2.06 m)	251 lb (114 kg)	So	St. John's School; Auburn	Houston, TX
C	34	Jayden Leverett	6 ft 11 in (2.11 m)	266 lb (121 kg)	So	Chapin	El Paso, TX
F	35	Jackson Sheffield	6 ft 10 in (2.08 m)	241 lb (109 kg)	Fr	Hoover HS	Hoover, AL

Head coach

- Mark Byington (UNC Wilmington)

Assistant coach(es)

- Rick Ray (Grand View)
- Rodney Terry (St. Edward's)
- Xavier Joyner (Husson)
- Joel Justus
- Matt Bucklin (Georgia)
- Andy Farrell (Dayton)

Legend

- (C) Team captain
- (S) Suspended
- (I) Ineligible
- (W) Walk-on
- Injured
- Current redshirt

Roster
Last update: November 13, 2026

== Schedule and results ==
Date time, TV	Rank^{#}	Opponent^{#}	Result	Record	High points	High rebounds	High assists	Site (attendance) city, state
Exhibition
September 27, 2026*; 11:00 a.m., ESPN+		vs. Virginia; TheLinkU Invitational	W 82–73	–	–	–	–	Credit One Stadium; Charleston, SC
October 19, 2026*; 6:00 p.m.		UAB	W 97–65	–	–	–	–	Memorial Gymnasium; Nashville, TN
Non-conference regular season
November 2, 2026*; 6:00 p.m., SECN+	No. 24	Bellarmine	W 93–47	1–0	20 – Tanner	9 – Williams-Adams	6 – Tanner	Memorial Gymnasium (6,319); Nashville, TN
November 5, 2026*; 5:00 p.m., ESPN2	No. 24	Wake Forest	W 74–51	2–0	17 – Tanner	10 – Tanner	3 – Büyüktuncel	Memorial Gymnasium (7,240); Nashville, TN
November 10, 2026*; 6:15 p.m., SECN+	No. 22	Memphis	W 105–81	3–0	23 – Glass	8 – Büyüktuncel	4 – Tied	Memorial Gymnasium (9,350); Nashville, TN
November 13, 2026*; 6:00 p.m., SECN+	No. 22	Prairie View A&M	W 89–62	4–0	19 – Glass	11 – Dak	4 – Tied	Memorial Gymnasium (7,152); Nashville, TN
November 17, 2026*; 7:00 p.m., SECN+	No. 15	Eastern Illinois	W 96–50	5–0	21 – Tanner	6 – Tied	6 – Bing	Memorial Gymnasium (6,238); Nashville, TN
November 20, 2026*; 7:00 p.m., SECN+	No. 15	UCF	W 82–74	6–0	23 – Tanner	13 – Büyüktuncel	4 – Tied	Memorial Gymnasium (8,142); Nashville, TN
November 24, 2026*; 6:00 p.m., Peacock/NBCSN		at Ohio State						Value City Arena; Columbus, OH
November 27, 2026*; 1:00 p.m., SECN+		Southern						Memorial Gymnasium; Nashville, TN
December 2, 2026*; 6:15 p.m., ACCN		at Notre Dame; SEC/ACC Challenge						Purcell Pavilion; South Bend, IN
December 6, 2026*; 7:00 p.m., ACCN		at California						Haas Pavilion; Berkeley, CA
December 12, 2026*; 1:00 p.m., SECN		West Georgia						Memorial Gymnasium; Nashville, TN
December 18, 2026*; 4:00 p.m., SECN+		Southern Indiana						Memorial Gymnasium; Nashville, TN
December 21, 2026*; 4:00 p.m., SECN+		Milwaukee						Memorial Gymnasium; Nashville, TN
December 29, 2026*; 7:00 p.m., SECN		Alcorn State						Memorial Gymnasium; Nashville, TN
SEC regular season
January 2, 2027; 1:00 p.m., ESPN or ESPN2		at Tennessee; Rivalry						Thompson–Boling Arena; Knoxville, TN
January 6, 2027; 6:00 p.m., SECN		Mississippi State						Memorial Gymnasium; Nashville, TN
January 9, 2027; 10:00 a.m., ESPN		at Florida						O'Connell Center; Gainesville, FL
January 12, 2027; 8:00 p.m., SECN		South Carolina						Memorial Gymnasium; Nashville, TN
January 16, 2027; 3:00 p.m., ESPN or ESPN2		at Kentucky						Rupp Arena; Lexington, KY
January 19, 2027; 6:00 p.m., SECN		Auburn						Memorial Gymnasium; Nashville, TN
January 23, 2027; 7:00 p.m., ESPN, ESPN2 or ESPNU		Missouri						Memorial Gymnasium; Nashville, TN
January 27, 2027; 8:00 p.m., ESPN2 or ESPNU		at Ole Miss						SJB Pavilion; Oxford, MS
January 30, 2027; 1:00 p.m., ESPN or ESPN2		Texas A&M; Coaches vs. Cancer						Memorial Gymnasium; Nashville, TN
February 2, 2027; 8:00 p.m., ESPNU		at LSU						Pete Maravich Assembly Center; Baton Rouge, LA
February 6, 2027; 7:00 or 7:30 p.m., ESPN		Arkansas						Memorial Gymnasium; Nashville, TN
February 9, 2027; 6:00 p.m., SECN		at Georgia						Stegeman Coliseum; Athens, GA
February 13, 2027; 1:00 p.m., ESPN or ESPN2		Texas						Memorial Gymnasium; Nashville, TN
February 20, 2027; 3:00 or 3:30 p.m., ESPN2		at Texas A&M						Reed Arena; College Station, TX
February 23, 2027; 8:00 p.m., ESPN or ESPN2		Kentucky						Memorial Gymnasium; Nashville, TN
February 27, 2027; 7:30 p.m., ESPN or ESPN2		at Alabama						Coleman Coliseum; Tuscaloosa, AL
March 3, 2027; 8:00 p.m., ESPN2 or ESPNU		at Oklahoma						Lloyd Noble Center; Norman, OK
March 6, 2027; 1:00 p.m., ESPN or ESPNU		Tennessee; Rivalry						Memorial Gymnasium; Nashville, TN
SEC tournament
March 10–14, 2027; TBA		vs. TBD						Bridgestone Arena; Nashville, TN
*Non-conference game. ^{#}Rankings from AP poll. (#) Tournament seedings in parentheses. All times are in Central Time.

== Rankings ==
Ranking movements Legend: ██ Increase in ranking ██ Decrease in ranking
	Week																				
Poll	Pre	1	2	3	4	5	6	7	8	9	10	11	12	13	14	15	16	17	18	19	Final
AP	24	22	15																		
Coaches	21	19	16																		
