= Kevin Overton =

American basketball player (born 2004)

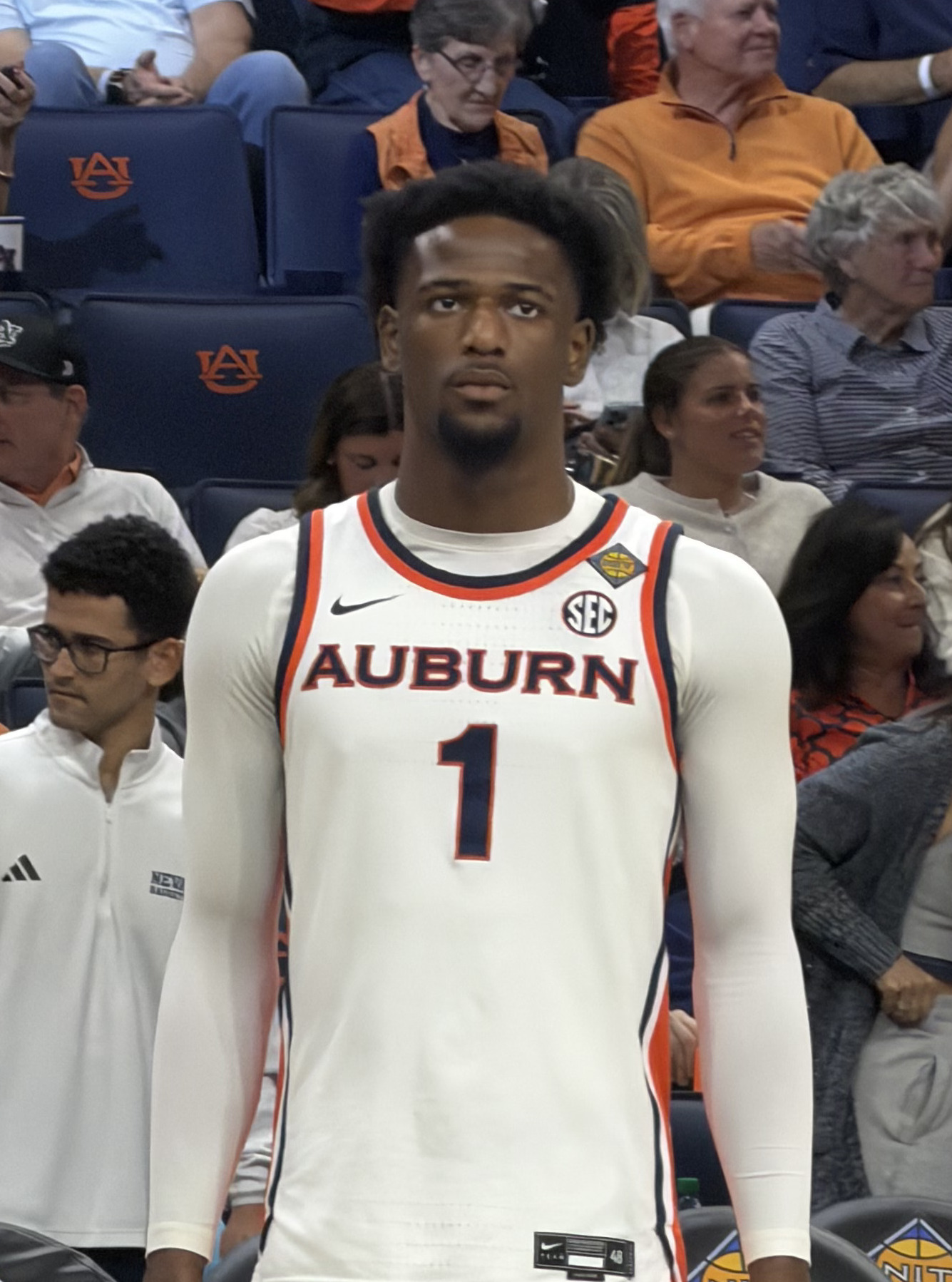
- Overton in 2026

No. 1 – Auburn Tigers
- Position: Shooting guard
- League: Southeastern Conference

Personal information
- Born: January 6, 2004 (age 22)
- Listed height: 6 ft 5 in (1.96 m)
- Listed weight: 205 lb (93 kg)

Career information
- High school: Sunrise Christian (Wichita, Kansas)
- College: Drake (2023–2024); Texas Tech (2024–2025); Auburn (2025–present)

Career highlights
- NIT champion (2026); NIT MVP (2026)

Kevin Overton (born January 6, 2004) is an American basketball player for the Auburn Tigers of the Southeastern Conference (SEC). He previously played for the Drake Bulldogs and the Texas Tech Red Raiders.

== College career ==
=== Drake ===
Overton played for Drake in his freshman season. He started all 35 games in 2023–24, averaging 11.3 points and 3.3 rebounds per game. He was named freshman of the week four times by the Ohio Valley Conference. Overton entered the transfer portal in March 2024.

=== Texas Tech ===
Overton committed to Texas Tech on April 16, 2024. When the team played against Drake in the NCAA Division I men's basketball tournament, Overton described the meeting as "personal." Following a loss to Florida in the NCAA quarter-finals, he announced that he would enter his name in the transfer portal.

=== Auburn ===
Overton committed to Auburn on April 17, 2025. Ahead of the season, CJ Moore of The Athletic wrote that Overton was one of five transfer players who could surprise in the 2025–26 season. He scored a career-high 29 points against the NC State Wolfpack. He led the team with 22 points as Auburn beat Mississippi State in the 2026 SEC tournament.

Overton won the 2026 National Invitation Tournament alongside the team, scoring 26 points, including a three-point shot with eight seconds left to tie the game. He was named as the tournament MVP. After his game-tying shot, Overton said that he was "ready for the moment" after Tahaad Pettiford inbounded the ball to him.

== Career statistics ==
Legend
GP	Games played	GS	Games started	MPG	Minutes per game
FG%	Field goal percentage	3P%	3-point field goal percentage	FT%	Free throw percentage
RPG	Rebounds per game	APG	Assists per game	SPG	Steals per game
BPG	Blocks per game	PPG	Points per game	**Bold**	Career high

=== College ===
Year	Team	GP	GS	MPG	FG%	3P%	FT%	RPG	APG	SPG	BPG	PPG
2023–24	Drake	35	35	29.9	.440	.346	.795	3.3	1.1	0.6	0.2	11.3
2024–25	Texas Tech	36	1	22.3	.422	.331	.779	3.7	0.9	0.5	0.2	7.8
2025–26	Auburn	38	36	31.7	.446	.413	.860	3.3	1.3	1.1	0.2	14.1
Career		109	72	28.0	.438	.372	.820	3.4	1.1	0.8	0.2	11.1
