= 2027 SEC men's basketball tournament =

American college basketball postseason tournament

2026 SEC men's basketball tournament
- Classification: Division I
- Season: 2025–26
- Teams: 16
- Site: Bridgestone Arena; Nashville, Tennessee
- Television: SEC Network, ESPN

2026–27 Southeastern Conference men's basketball standings
	Conf.				Overall
Team	W		L	PCT	W		L	PCT
Texas A&M	0	–	0	–	4	–	0	1.000
No. 18 Alabama	0	–	0	–	3	–	0	1.000
No. 1 Florida	0	–	0	–	3	–	0	1.000
Georgia	0	–	0	–	3	–	0	1.000
LSU	0	–	0	–	3	–	0	1.000
Mississippi State	0	–	0	–	3	–	0	1.000
Ole Miss	0	–	0	–	3	–	0	1.000
South Carolina	0	–	0	–	3	–	0	1.000
No. 7 Texas	0	–	0	–	3	–	0	1.000
No. 22 Vanderbilt	0	–	0	–	3	–	0	1.000
Auburn	0	–	0	–	2	–	0	1.000
No. 11 Tennessee	0	–	0	–	2	–	0	1.000
No. 19 Arkansas	0	–	0	–	2	–	1	.667
No. 24 Kentucky	0	–	0	–	2	–	1	.667
Missouri	0	–	0	–	2	–	1	.667
Oklahoma	0	–	0	–	2	–	1	.667
† 2027 SEC tournament winner As of November 13, 2026; Rankings from AP poll

The 2027 SEC men's basketball tournament is a postseason men's basketball tournament for the 2026–27 season for the Southeastern Conference (SEC). The tournament will be held from March 10–14, 2027 at Bridgestone Arena in Nashville, Tennessee. The winner will receive the conference's automatic bid to the 2027 NCAA tournament.

== Seeds ==
All 16 members of the SEC will participate in the tournament. The top eight seeds will earn a bye to the second round, with the top four seeds earning a double bye to the quarterfinals. Ties will be broken by head-to-head results, results vs. the top-seed and going on down until the tie is broken, and finally a coin toss (or a drawing of lots if three or more teams are involved).

Seed	School	Conference record	Tiebreaker 1	Tiebreaker 2
1		–		
2		–		
3		–		
4		–		
5		–		
6		–		
7		–		
8		–		
9		–		
10		–		
11		–		
12		–		
13		–		
14		–		
15		–		
16		–		

== Schedule ==
Game	Time	Matchup	Score	Television	Attendance
First round – Wednesday, March 10
1	11:30 a.m.	No. 9 vs. No. 16	–	SECN	
2	2:00 p.m.	No. 12 vs. No. 13	–	SECN	
3	6:00 p.m.	No. 10 vs. No. 15	–	SECN	
4	8:30 p.m.	No. 11 vs. No. 14	–	SECN	
Second round – Thursday, March 11
5	11:30 a.m.	No. 8 vs. Winner Game 1	–	SECN	
6	2:00 p.m.	No. 5 vs. Winner Game 2	–	SECN	
7	6:00 p.m.	No. 7 vs. Winner Game 3	–	SECN	
8	8:30 p.m.	No. 6 vs. Winner Game 4	–	SECN	
Quarterfinals – Friday, March 12
9	12:00 p.m.	No. 1 vs. Winner Game 5	–	ESPN	
10	2:30 p.m.	No. 4 vs. Winner Game 6	–	ESPN	
11	6:00 p.m.	No. 2 vs. Winner Game 7	–	SECN	
12	8:30 p.m.	No. 3 vs. Winner Game 8	–	SECN	
Semifinals – Saturday, March 13
13	12:00 p.m.	Winner Game 9 vs. Winner Game 10	–	ESPN	
14	2:30 p.m.	Winner Game 11 vs. Winner Game 12	–	ESPN	
Championship – Sunday, March 14
15	12:00 p.m.	Winner Game 13 vs. Winner Game 14	–	ESPN	
Game times in CT. Rankings denote tournament seeding.

== Bracket ==
First round Wednesday, March 10; SECN
9
16
12
13
10
15
11
14

Second round Thursday, March 11; SECN
8
5
7
6

Quarterfinals; Friday, March 12; ESPN/SECN
1
4
2
3

Semifinals; Saturday, March 13; ESPN

Championship; Sunday, March 14; ESPN

* denotes overtime period

== Awards and Honors ==
=== All-Tournament Team ===
Player	Team

MVP in bold
