= Filip Jović (basketball) =

Serbian basketball player (born 2005)

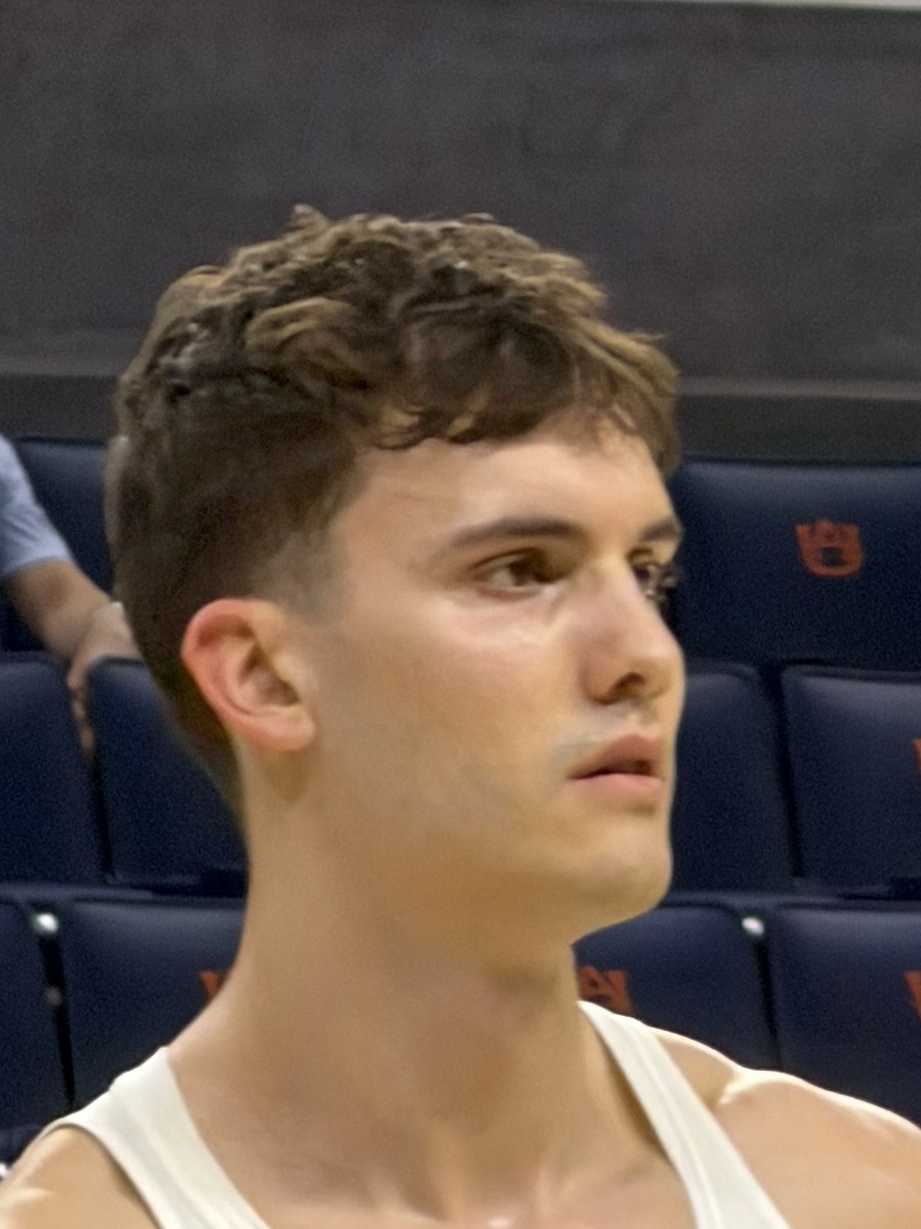
- Jović in 2026

No. 38 – UCLA Bruins
- Position: Power forward / center
- Conference: Big Ten Conference

Personal information
- Born: February 1, 2005 (age 21) Bijeljina, Republika Srpska, Bosnia and Herzegovina
- Listed height: 6 ft 8 in (2.03 m)
- Listed weight: 245 lb (111 kg)

Career information
- College: Auburn (2025–2026); UCLA (2026–present)
- Playing career: 2021–2025

Career history
- 2021–2022: OKK Spars
- 2023–2025: Mega
- 2023: →OKK Beograd

Career highlights
- NIT champion (2026)
Medals
Men's basketball
Representing Serbia
FIBA U18 EuroBasket
Gold medal – first place	2023 Serbia	Team

Filip Jović (Serbian Cyrillic: Филип Јовић; born 1 February 2005) is a Bosnian Serb college basketball player for the UCLA Bruins of the Big Ten Conference. He previously played for the Auburn Tigers.

== Career ==
Jović played for OKK Spars in the 2021–22 season, before moving to OKK Beograd for the 2022–23 season.

=== KK Mega Basket ===
Jović first played for KK Mega Basket in the 2023–24 season. In the 2024–25 season, he averaged 12 points and 22 minutes per game.

=== Auburn ===
Jović committed to the Auburn Tigers in May 2025. He made his first start in Auburn's first game of the season against the Bethune–Cookman Wildcats. Against the South Carolina Gamecocks in January 2026, he led the team to a four-point victory. He scored a season-high 23 points in the game, along with six rebounds, two steals, and a block. Head coach Steven Pearl described his performance in the game as "phenomenal."

Jović won the 2026 National Invitation Tournament alongside the team, scoring 12 points. He entered the transfer portal two days later, on April 7.

=== UCLA ===
Jović committed to UCLA on April 9.

== International career ==
Jović played for the Serbia men's national under-17 basketball team at the 2022 FIBA Under-17 Basketball World Cup. He also played in the 2024 FIBA U20 EuroBasket competition for the Serbia men's national under-20 basketball team.

== Career statistics ==
Legend
GP	Games played	GS	Games started	MPG	Minutes per game
FG%	Field goal percentage	3P%	3-point field goal percentage	FT%	Free throw percentage
RPG	Rebounds per game	APG	Assists per game	SPG	Steals per game
BPG	Blocks per game	PPG	Points per game	**Bold**	Career high

=== College ===
Year	Team	GP	GS	MPG	FG%	3P%	FT%	RPG	APG	SPG	BPG	PPG
2025–26	Auburn	37	9	18.3	.640	.000	.545	4.0	.6	.6	.3	6.3
