= Blake Muschalek =

American basketball player (born 2004)

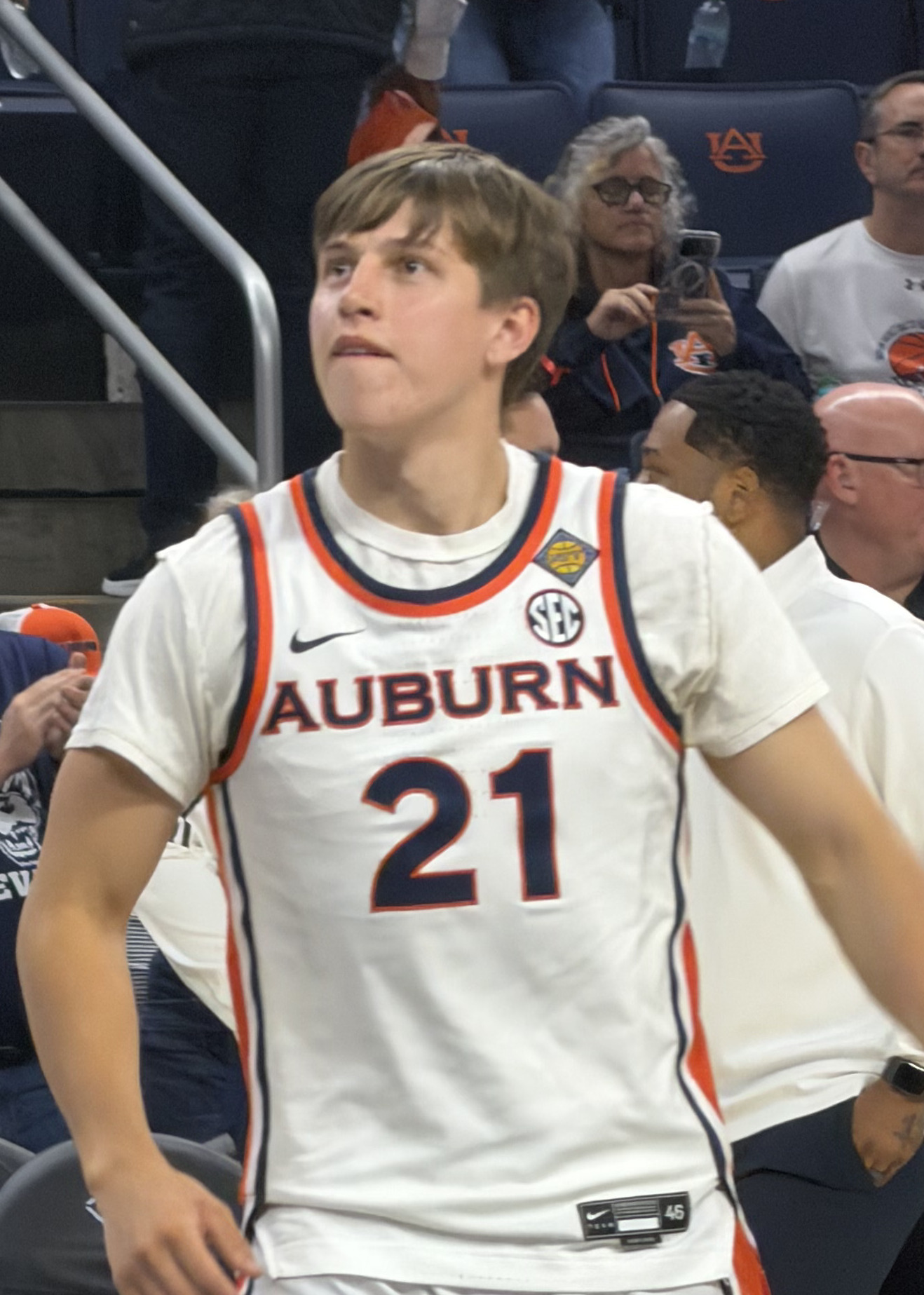
- Muschalek in 2026

No. 21 – Auburn Tigers
- Position: Guard
- League: Southeastern Conference

Personal information
- Born: August 3, 2004 (age 21)
- Listed height: 6 ft 3 in (1.91 m)
- Listed weight: 190 lb (86 kg)

Career information
- High school: Trinity Christian (Addison, Texas)
- College: Auburn (2023–present)

Career highlights
- NIT champion (2026)

Blake Muschalek (born August 3, 2004) is an American basketball player for the Auburn Tigers of the Southeastern Conference (SEC).

== Early life ==
Muschalek played for Trinity Christian Academy, breaking the school all-time scoring record.

== College career ==
=== Auburn ===
Muschalek committed to Auburn in May 2023. He joined the team as a walk-on. As one of six players on the practice team in the 2024–25 season, Muschalek participated in the post-game celebrations when Auburn advanced to the Final Four. Muschalek said, "it's been an incredible experience for me." He was placed on scholarship by Bruce Pearl following the game.

At the beginning of the 2025–26 season, Muschalek was praised by Steven Pearl, who said that he could receive more minutes in future matches. He scored a career-high five points against Arkansas. The game was just his second career match where he played for over ten minutes. He won the 2026 National Invitation Tournament alongside the team.

== Career statistics ==
Legend
GP	Games played	GS	Games started	MPG	Minutes per game
FG%	Field goal percentage	3P%	3-point field goal percentage	FT%	Free throw percentage
RPG	Rebounds per game	APG	Assists per game	SPG	Steals per game
BPG	Blocks per game	PPG	Points per game	**Bold**	Career high

=== College ===
Year	Team	GP	GS	MPG	FG%	3P%	FT%	RPG	APG	SPG	BPG	PPG
2023–24	Auburn	15	0	1.5	.000	–	.615	0.1	0.1	0.1	0.0	0.5
2024–25	Auburn	13	0	2.0	1.000	–	.750	0.2	0.2	0.1	0.0	0.7
2025–26	Auburn	27	0	5.4	.190	.143	.600	0.6	0.2	0.4	0.0	0.6
Career		55	0	3.5	.259	.143	.630	0.3	0.1	0.3	0.0	0.6
