= Narcisse Ngoy =

French basketball player (born 2004)

No. 94 – Auburn Tigers
- Position: Center
- Conference: Southeastern Conference

Personal information
- Born: July 13, 2004 (age 22) Paris, France
- Listed height: 7 ft 0 in (2.13 m)
- Listed weight: 280 lb (127 kg)

Career information
- College: Auburn (2026–present)
- NBA draft: 2026: 2nd round, 57th overall pick
- Drafted by: Atlanta Hawks
- Playing career: 2023–present

Career history
- 2023–2024: Chorale Roanne
- 2024–2025: Rouen Métropole
- 2025–2026: Poitiers
- Stats at NBA.com
- Stats at Basketball Reference

Narcisse Ngoy (born 13 July 2004) is a French college basketball player for the Auburn Tigers of the Southeastern Conference (SEC). He previously played for Chorale Roanne Basket, Rouen Metropole Basket, and Poitiers Basket 86 in France. On June 24, 2026, Ngoy was selected with the 57th overall pick by the Atlanta Hawks in the 2026 NBA draft, he was then traded to the Los Angeles Clippers.

== Career ==
Ngoy played for various teams in France. For Poitiers Basket 86, he averaged 10.6 points per game by March 2026 of the 2025–26 season, alongside 11.5 rebounds and 2.5 blocks. Playing as a center, he was described as a dominant figure in the paint by the Ligue nationale de basket. In his last season with them, he led the team in rebounds and blocks per game.

=== Auburn ===
Ngoy signed to play for Auburn on March 31, 2026. Head coach Steven Pearl said, "he's a high-upside young man who brings toughness, physicality, and a team-first mindset to everything he does."

=== NBA ===
On June 24, 2026, Ngoy was drafted by the Atlanta Hawks with the 57th overall pick in the 2026 NBA draft and traded to the Los Angeles Clippers shortly after. However, he has re-affirmed his commitment to play at Auburn in 2026–27.

== International career ==
Ngoy represented France at the 2024 FIBA U20 EuroBasket competition, averaging 1.5 points per game and playing in every game but the final.
