= Sebastian Williams-Adams =

American basketball player (born 2006)

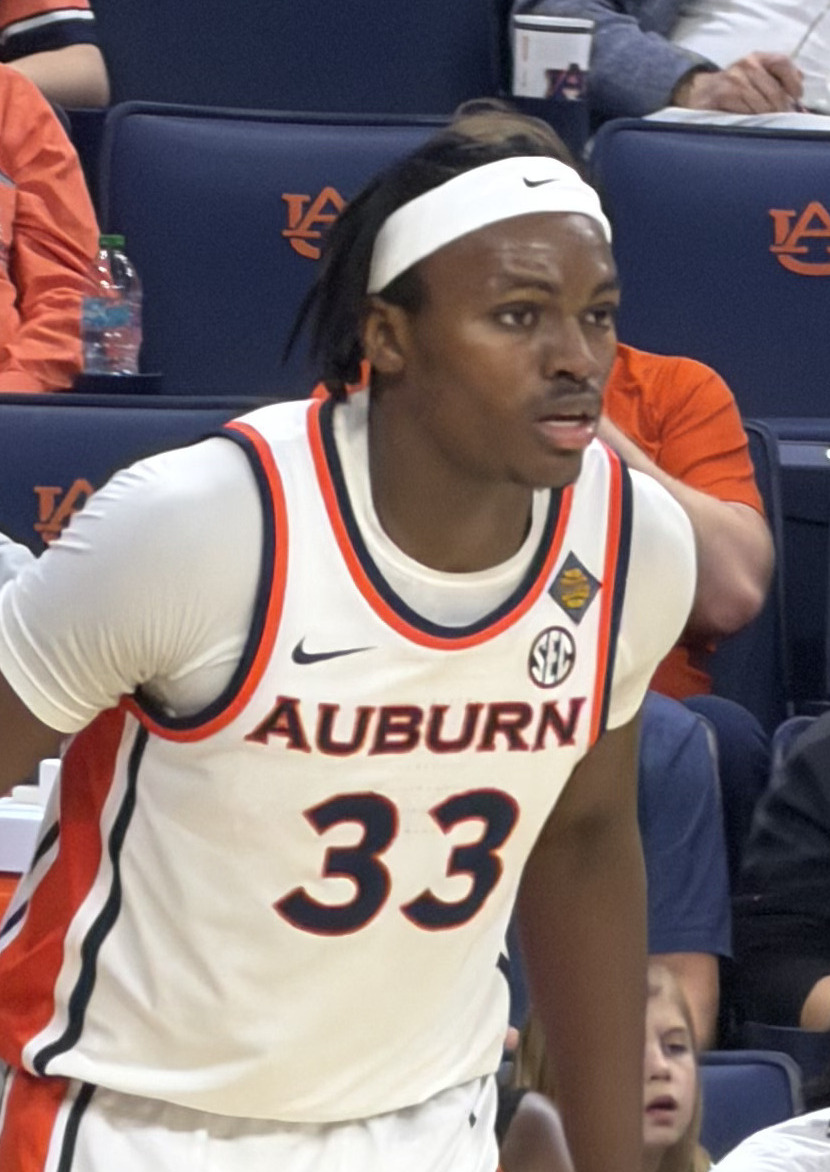
- Williams-Adams in 2026

Vanderbilt Commodores
- Position: Power forward / small forward
- Conference: Southeastern Conference

Personal information
- Born: October 29, 2006 (age 20)
- Listed height: 6 ft 8 in (2.03 m)
- Listed weight: 230 lb (104 kg)

Career information
- High school: St. John's (Houston, Texas)
- College: Auburn (2025–2026); Vanderbilt (2026–present)

Career highlights
- NIT champion (2026)

Sebastian Williams-Adams (born October 29, 2006) is an American college basketball player for the Vanderbilt Commodores of the Southeastern Conference (SEC). He previously played for the Auburn Tigers.

== High school career ==
Playing for St. John's High School in Houston, Texas, Williams-Adams averaged 21 points, ten rebounds, and 4.4 assists per game in his senior season.

== College career ==
=== Auburn ===
Williams-Adams committed to Auburn on November 17, 2024. He was rated as the 40th overall player in the class of 2025 by 247Sports. He played his first career game against the Bethune–Cookman Wildcats, scoring fifteen points. He described Tahaad Pettiford as a leader on the team who helped out freshmen such as himself. He averaged 11 points per game over the first four games of the season.

In the midseason, Auburn was on a four-game winning streak. Williams-Adams was considered a key played during that streak, described by head coach Steven Pearl as the "ultimate team guy." After a loss against the Alabama Crimson Tide, Pearl said that he was looking for the same thing that he saw in Williams-Adams from the rest of the team. He won the 2026 National Invitation Tournament alongside the team, scoring 13 points in the championship.

Williams-Adams confirmed his return for the 2026–27 season on April 10. Soon after, he changed his mind and entered the portal.

=== Vanderbilt ===
Williams-Adams committed to Vanderbilt on April 21.

== Career statistics ==
Legend
GP	Games played	GS	Games started	MPG	Minutes per game
FG%	Field goal percentage	3P%	3-point field goal percentage	FT%	Free throw percentage
RPG	Rebounds per game	APG	Assists per game	SPG	Steals per game
BPG	Blocks per game	PPG	Points per game	**Bold**	Career high

=== College ===
Year	Team	GP	GS	MPG	FG%	3P%	FT%	RPG	APG	SPG	BPG	PPG
2025–26	Auburn	38	21	27.3	.505	.308	.519	3.5	1.5	1.2	0.8	7.0
