= Simon Walker (basketball) =

American basketball player (born 2006)

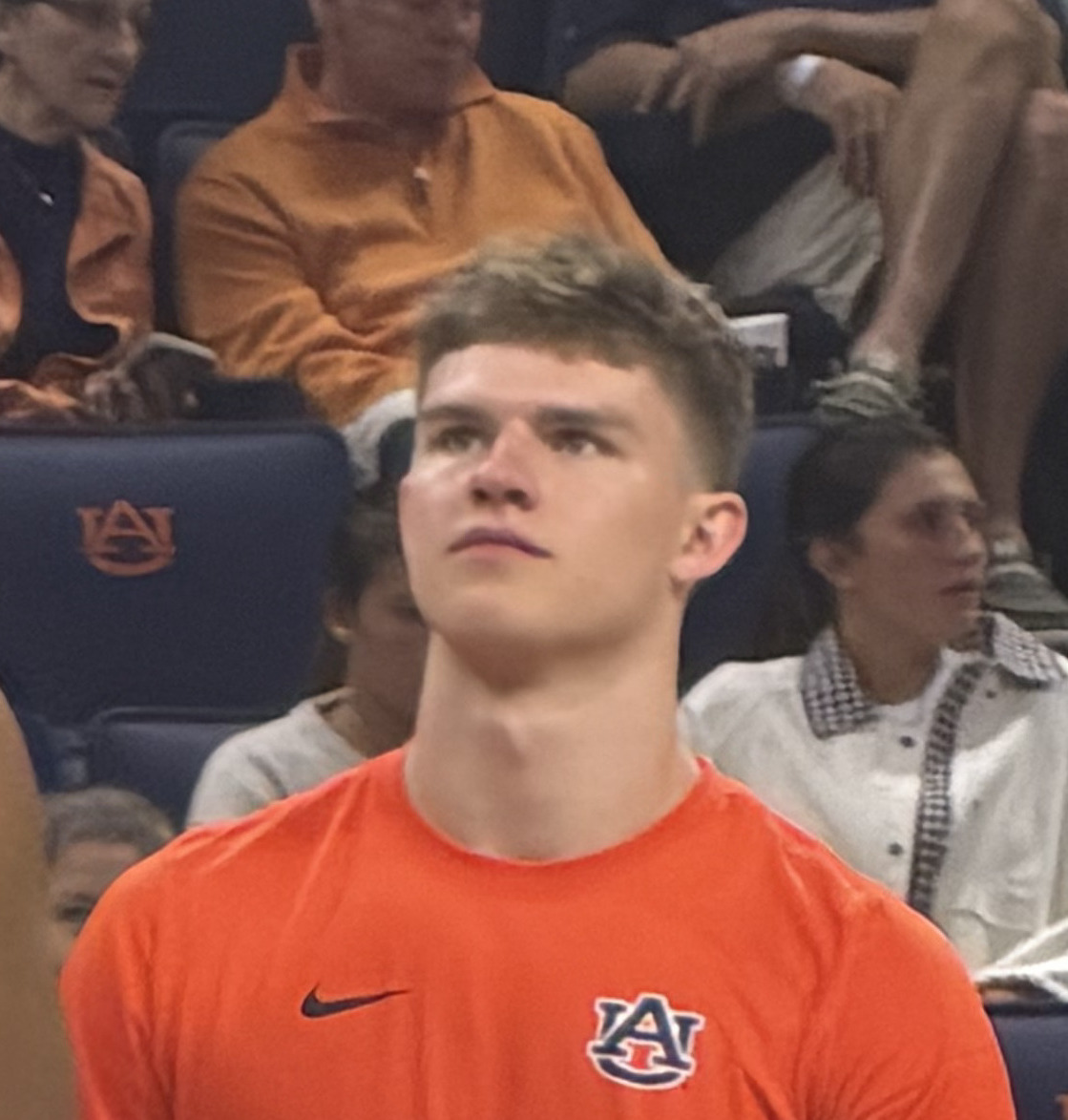
- Walker in 2026

No. 10 – Auburn Tigers
- Position: Shooting guard
- League: Southeastern Conference

Personal information
- Born: May 8, 2006 (age 20)
- Listed height: 6 ft 5 in (1.96 m)
- Listed weight: 205 lb (93 kg)

Career information
- High school: Huntsville (Huntsville, Alabama)
- College: Auburn (2025–present)

Career highlights
- NIT champion (2026)

Simon Walker (born May 8, 2006) is an American basketball player for the Auburn Tigers of the Southeastern Conference (SEC).

== College career ==
=== Auburn ===
Walker was first offered by Auburn in August 2023. He officially committed to the team in September 2024. His announcement came through a livestream hosted by 247Sports. According to 247Sports, he was the 134th-ranked recruit in the class of 2025, and the 3rd best player in the state.

Prior to playing in his first game, he suffered an injury in his right foot in September 2025. He had surgery to repair the foot, with head coach Steven Pearl calling the injury a "minor" setback. He played his first game two months later against the Jackson State Tigers in November. In that game, he scored five three-point field goals in seven minutes, without missing a shot. Walker won the 2026 National Invitation Tournament alongside the team.

Walker announced his return to Auburn for the 2026–27 season in April 2026.

== Career statistics ==
Legend
GP	Games played	GS	Games started	MPG	Minutes per game
FG%	Field goal percentage	3P%	3-point field goal percentage	FT%	Free throw percentage
RPG	Rebounds per game	APG	Assists per game	SPG	Steals per game
BPG	Blocks per game	PPG	Points per game	**Bold**	Career high

=== College ===
Year	Team	GP	GS	MPG	FG%	3P%	FT%	RPG	APG	SPG	BPG	PPG
2025–26	Auburn	13	0	5.2	.571	.529	–	.5	.2	.1	–	2.5
