= Keyshawn Hall =

American basketball player (born 2003)

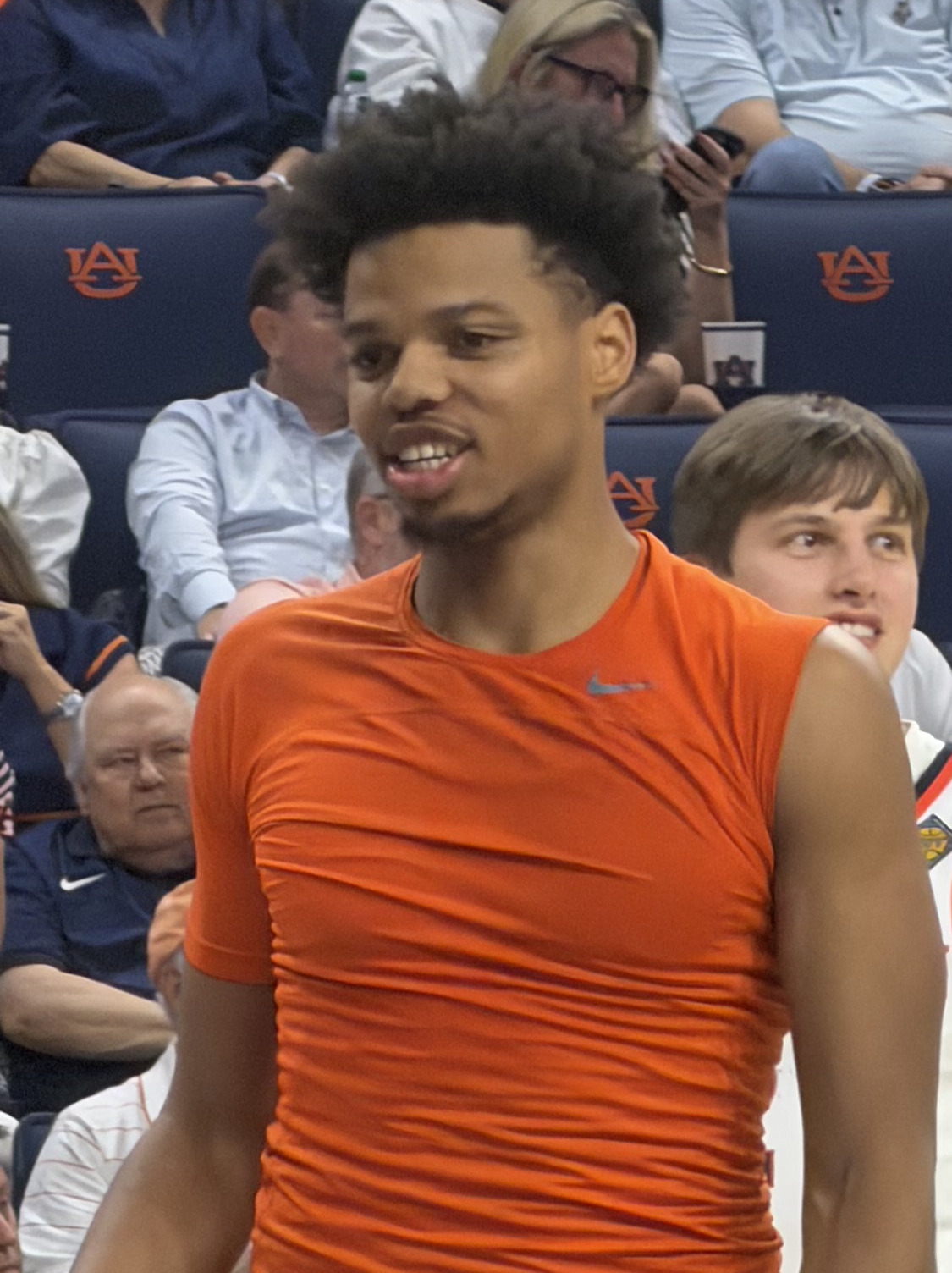
- Hall with Auburn in 2026

No. 7 – St. John's Red Storm
- Position: Small forward
- League: Big East Conference

Personal information
- Born: April 9, 2003 (age 23) Cleveland, Ohio, U.S.
- Listed height: 6 ft 7 in (2.01 m)
- Listed weight: 230 lb (104 kg)

Career information
- High school: Denver Prep Academy (Denver, Colorado)
- College: UNLV (2022–2023); George Mason (2023–2024); UCF (2024–2025); Auburn (2025–2026); St. John's (2026–present)

Career highlights
- NIT champion (2026); Second-team All-Atlantic 10 (2024); Second-team All-Big 12 (2025); Third-team All-SEC (2026); Big 12 All-Newcomer Team (2025)

Keyshawn O. Hall (born April 9, 2003) is an American college basketball player for the St. John's Red Storm of the Big East Conference. He previously played for the UNLV Runnin' Rebels, George Mason Patriots, UCF Knights and Auburn Tigers.

== High school career ==
Hall attended Denver Prep Academy in Denver, Colorado. Hall initially had no offers, before gaining offers following his play in the AAU circuit. As a three-star recruit, he committed to play college basketball at the University of Nevada, Las Vegas over offers from Saint Mary's, Arizona State, and Washington State.

== College career ==
As a true freshman, Hall appeared in 18 games for the Runnin' Rebels, averaging 5.4 points per game. Following the conclusion of the season, he entered the transfer portal. Hall transferred to George Mason University and made an immediate impact for the Patriots. He led the team in scoring and rebounding, being named to the second-team All-Atlantic 10. He finished his sophomore season averaging 16.6 points and 8.9 rebounds per game before entering the transfer portal for the second time. On April 19, 2024, Hall announced his decision to transfer to the University of Central Florida. Against Arizona State, he scored a career-high 40 points to go along with seven rebounds and six assists, leading to Knights to 95–89 victory. After playing at Auburn University as a senior, Hall committed to play at St. John's University for his fifth season on August 26, 2026. He is currently involved in a lawsuit against the NCAA, though technically ineligible at the time of his commitment .

== Professional career ==
After being automatically entered into the 2026 NBA draft, Hall went unselected. He then played with the Miami Heat in the 2026 NBA Summer League.

== Career statistics ==
Legend
GP	Games played	GS	Games started	MPG	Minutes per game
FG%	Field goal percentage	3P%	3-point field goal percentage	FT%	Free throw percentage
RPG	Rebounds per game	APG	Assists per game	SPG	Steals per game
BPG	Blocks per game	PPG	Points per game	**Bold**	Career high

=== College ===
Year	Team	GP	GS	MPG	FG%	3P%	FT%	RPG	APG	SPG	BPG	PPG
2022–23	UNLV	18	0	10.7	**.479**	**.500**	.680	1.6	.4	.2	.2	5.4
2023–24	George Mason	29	28	30.6	.474	.357	.844	**8.1**	1.4	.4	.3	16.6
2024–25	UCF	33	33	33.5	.427	.354	.816	7.1	2.4	**.8**	.5	18.8
2025–26	Auburn	**36**	**36**	**33.6**	.451	.379	**.857**	7.1	**2.6**	.7	**.6**	**19.3**
Career		116	97	29.3	.450	.371	.833	6.5	1.9	.6	.4	16.3
