= Elyjah Freeman =

American basketball player (born 2006)

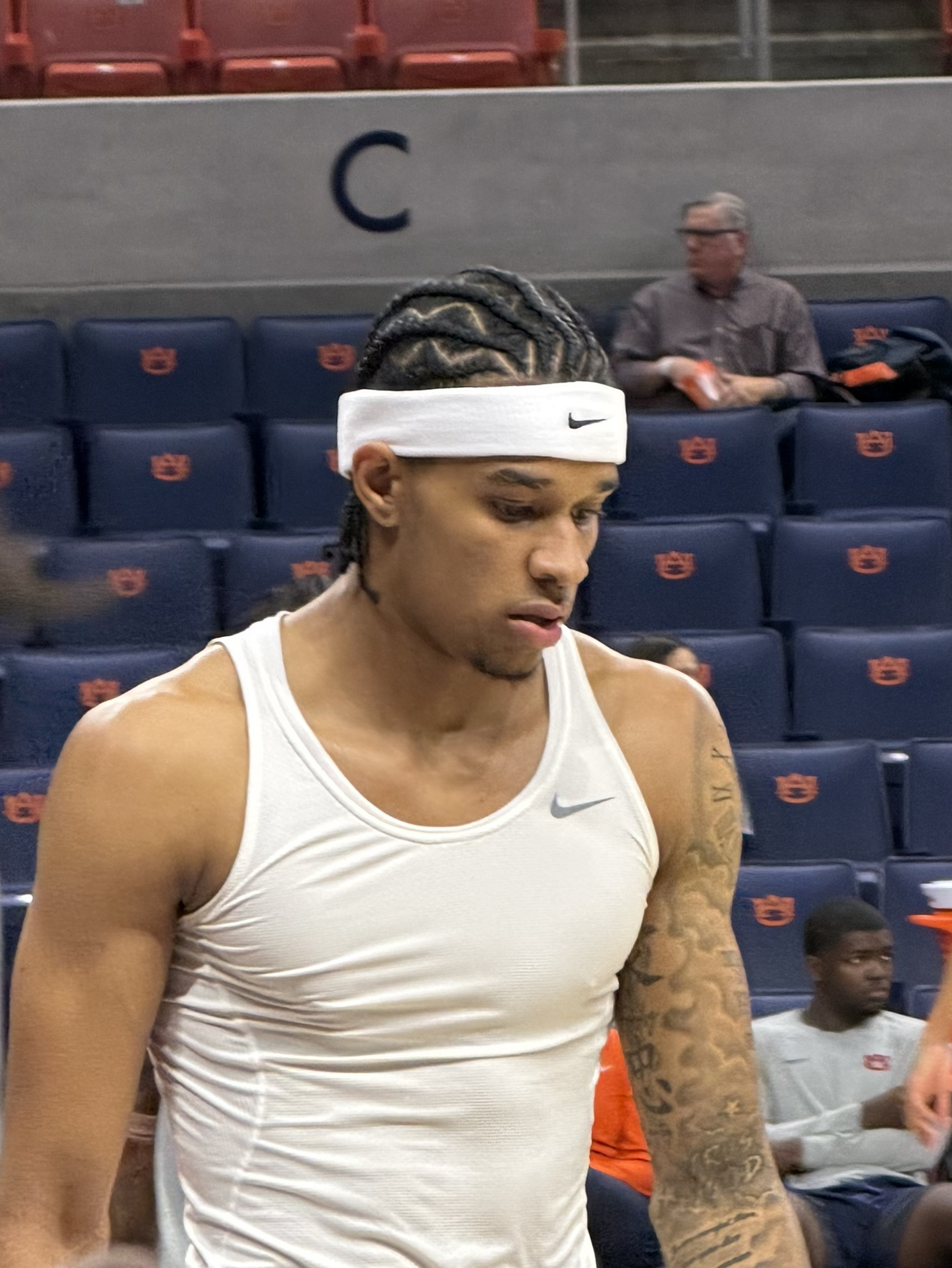
- Freeman in 2026

No. 6 – Texas Longhorns
- Position: Small forward / shooting guard
- Conference: Southeastern Conference

Personal information
- Born: August 15, 2006 (age 20) Palm Beach County, Florida, U.S.
- Listed height: 6 ft 8 in (2.03 m)
- Listed weight: 205 lb (93 kg)

Career information
- High school: Wellington (Wellington, Florida)
- College: Lincoln Memorial (2024–2025); Auburn (2025–2026); Texas (2026–present)

Career highlights
- NIT champion (2026); SAC Freshman of the Year (2025); First-team All-SAC (2025); SAC All-Freshman Team (2025)

Elyjah Freeman (born August 15, 2006) is an American college basketball player for the Texas Longhorns of the Southeastern Conference. He previously played for the Lincoln Memorial Railsplitters and Auburn Tigers.

== Early life and high school ==
Freeman grew up in Palm Beach, Florida and attended Wellington High School. He was named first-team All-Palm Beach County after averaging 15 points, 5.9 rebounds,1.9 assists, 2.1 steals, and one block per game.

== College career ==
Freeman began his college basketball career at Division II Lincoln Memorial. He averaged 18.9 points, 8.7 rebounds, and 3.2 assists per game and was named the South Atlantic Conference Freshman of the Year and first-team all-conference. After the end of the season, Freeman entered the NCAA transfer portal.

Freeman committed to transfer to Auburn over offers from Tennessee and Indiana. At Auburn, he played in 38 games, starting in 21 of the games and averaging 9.2 points, 5.2 rebounds, and 1.2 assists per game. On April 10, 2026, Freeman entered the transfer portal for the second time. This was met with slight controversy from the fans despite Freeman declaring he was "locked in" for the upcoming season.

On April 19, 2026, Freeman committed to transfer to Texas.

== Career statistics ==
Legend
GP	Games played	GS	Games started	MPG	Minutes per game
FG%	Field goal percentage	3P%	3-point field goal percentage	FT%	Free throw percentage
RPG	Rebounds per game	APG	Assists per game	SPG	Steals per game
BPG	Blocks per game	PPG	Points per game	**Bold**	Career high

=== College ===
==== Division I ====
Year	Team	GP	GS	MPG	FG%	3P%	FT%	RPG	APG	SPG	BPG	PPG
2025–26	Auburn	38	21	26.8	.444	.343	.699	5.2	1.2	1.3	.6	9.2

==== Division II ====
Year	Team	GP	GS	MPG	FG%	3P%	FT%	RPG	APG	SPG	BPG	PPG
2024–25	Lincoln Memorial	28	25	31.5	.578	.463	.802	9.1	2.4	1.8	.8	19.3
