= Huntsville High School (Alabama) =

Location
- 2304 Billie Watkins St SW; Huntsville, Alabama 35801; United States; 34°42′49″N 86°35′01″W

Information
- Type: Public
- Motto: "Altiora Docendo" (Higher things must be taught)
- School district: Huntsville City Schools
- CEEB code: 011485
- Principal: Kari Flippo
- Staff: 103.00 (FTE)
- Grades: 9-12
- Enrollment: 1,807 (2024-2025)
- Student to teacher ratio: 17.54
- Colors: Cardinal and blue
- Slogan: Go Big Red (GBR)
- Athletics: AHSAA Class 7A
- Nickname: HHS
- Team name: Huntsville Panthers
- Website: www.huntsvillecityschools.org/o/hhs

Huntsville High School is a public high school in Huntsville, Alabama, United States. It is part of the Huntsville City Schools district with approximately 1,850 students currently enrolled in grades 9–12.

The school is located at the intersection of Bob Wallace Avenue (formerly 13th Street West) and Billie Watkins Street.

In 1975, Huntsville High School was awarded the 34th National Bellamy Flag Award which each year honored a U.S. high school that excelled in teaching the ideals of the Pledge of Allegiance. The award was named for Pledge of Allegiance author Francis Bellamy.

In 2014, the school constructed its Freshman Academy on-site, intended to facilitate students' transition from middle school to high school and in which the majority of its freshman classes take place. The school offers 15 Advanced Placement courses alongside preparatory courses for industry certification.

The school's principal, as of the 2023 school year, is Kari Flippo.

In 2025, Huntsville High School was ranked 14 among the top 20 high schools in Alabama.

== Athletics ==
Huntsville High School competes at the 7A classification of the AHSAA and uses the Panther nickname for all team sports. Huntsville High sponsors varsity-level athletics in the following sports:

Men's athletics	Women's athletics
Football	Flag football
Basketball	Basketball
Baseball	Softball
Wrestling	Cheerleading
Cross country	Cross country
Track and field	Track and field
Tennis	Tennis
Golf	Golf
Marching band	Marching band
Soccer	Soccer
Swimming and diving	Swimming and diving
Bowling	Bowling
Ice hockey	Volleyball

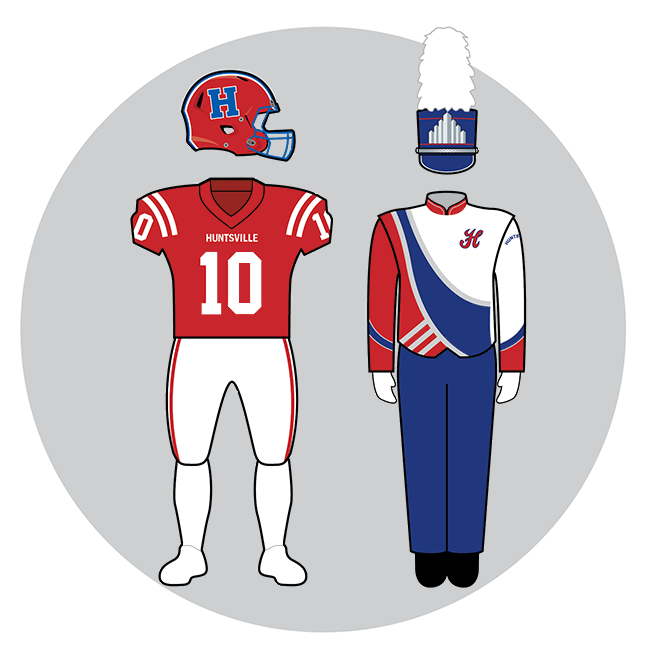
Football home and band uniforms

Huntsville High School competes in the Alabama High School Athletic Association (AHSAA), currently in class 7A, and its athletic teams are known as the Panthers. The school's athletic programs have a long history of competition in Alabama high school sports, with state championships dating back to at least the 1930s. The Panthers have won state championships in multiple sports, including success in gymnastics and cheerleading during periods when those activites were not part of the AHSAA's current championship structure.

The schools's early athletic success included a state basketball championship in 1930. Its programs subsequently developed across a wider range of sports, particularly swimming, tennis, and cross country. Huntsville's boys' tennis program won state championships in 1965, 1980, 1981, 1982, 1984, and 1990. The girls' tennis program also established a strong record, winning winning state championships in 1978, 1982, 1984, 1990, and 2015 before capturing the Class 7A championship in 2026.

Swimming and diving became among the school's most successful athletic programs. The boys' team won its first recorded AHSAA state championship in 1968 and subsequently captured additional titles in 1974, 1975, and 1977-1983. After returning to the top in 2012 and 2013, the Panthers began another dominant period in 2016. The boys' team won 10 consecutive combine Class 6A-7A state championships from 2016 through 2025, bringing its recorded total to 22 state titles an AHSSA record.

Cross country has also been a major source of championship success. The boys' team won state championships in 1977, 1983, 1984, and 1985, before returning to the prominence with four consecutive Class 7A championships from 2018 through 2021 and another Class 7A title in 2024. The girls' cross country program won state championships in 1987 and 1989, followed by the Class 7A championship in 2016 (after a runner-up finish in 2014).

The Lady Panthers volleyball program became one of the most successful high school volleyball programs in Alabama in the early 2000s. Under head coach Melanie Donahoo, who took over the program in 2000, Huntsville won 10 AHSAA state championships. The team captured four consecutive Class 5A titles from 2002 through 2005, followed by Class 6A championships in 2006, 2007, 2009, 2010, 2011, and 2012. The 2008 season ended with a state runner-up finish. The program also reached the state finals in 2013 and advanced to the state semifinals in 2015 and 2016. Donahoo's 10 state championships rank third among coaches in AHSAA volleyball history. Huntsville's earlier volleyball championship in 1994 brings the program's documented total to 11 state titles.

Girls' soccer produced several state championships: Class 6A titles in 2000 and 2002, followed by consecutive Class 5A championships in 2004 and 2005. The school's baseball program won the Class 6A state championship in 2011. Huntsville also won the Class 6A girls' golf championship in 2016 and the Class 6A girls' outdoor track and field championship in 1990. The girls' indoor track and field team won consecutive championships in 1988 and 1989.

More recently, Huntsville's wrestling program won the Class 7A state championship in 2024 (the school's first traditional state title in the sport). The school also won the Class 7A girls' tennis championship in 2026, adding to its earlier titles in the sport.

In addition to its AHSAA-recognized championships, Huntsville has a history of success in other athletic competitions. The school won gymnastics state championships during the 1980s, before the AHSAA discontinued its sponsorship of the sport in the 1998 season. Its cheerleading program also won the Medium Varsity division at the inaugural AHSAA State Cheerleading Championship in 1996, before cheerleading became an AHSAA-sponsored championship sport. Huntsville High School also fields a team in the Huntsville Amateur Hockey Association high school league.

== Notable alumni ==
- Graham Ashcraft, professional baseball pitcher
- Jerry Balisok, professional wrestler and FBI fugitive
- Jed Bradley, baseball player
- Larry Byrom, guitarist, songwriter; member of Steppenwolf, 1969-1972
- Lynn A. Collyar, U.S. Army major general, retired; former commanding general, U.S. Army Aviation & Missile Command
- Robert "Bud" Cramer, member of the United States House of Representatives
- Jan Davis, NASA astronaut
- Milton B. Halsey, U.S. Army major general
- Brewer Hicklen, baseball player in the Kansas City Royals organization
- Margaret Hoelzer, Olympic swimmer
- Bobby Luna, NFL football player
- Dee Margo, mayor of El Paso, Texas
- Paul McDonald, American Idol finalist in Season 10 and member of The Grand Magnolias
- Nicholas Morrow, NFL football player
- Benny Nelson, AFL football player for the Houston Oilers
- David F. O'Neill, naval aviator and major general, U.S. Marine Corps
- Loretta Spencer, 66th mayor of Huntsville
- Harry Townes, 1914-2001, Broadway, film and television actor (Perry Mason, The Twilight Zone, Star Trek, Bonanza, Gunsmoke)
- Javier Vaz, professional baseball player
- Simon Walker, college basketball player for the Auburn Tigers

== See also ==
- List of high schools in Alabama
