= Mike Burgomaster =

American basketball coach

Current position
- Title: Assistant coach
- Team: Auburn
- Conference: Southeastern Conference

Biographical details
- Education: University of Miami

Coaching career (HC unless noted)
- 2017–2018: Auburn (graduate assistant)
- 2023–present: Auburn (assistant/offensive coordinator)

Administrative career (AD unless noted)
- 2019–2021: Auburn (assistant DBO)
- 2021–2023: Auburn (assistant to HC/recruiting coordinator)

Mike Burgomaster is an American college basketball coach who is an assistant coach of the Auburn Tigers men's basketball team.

== Early life and playing career ==
Burgomaster grew up in Westford, Massachusetts and attended Westford Academy, where he played basketball. Burgomaster enrolled at the University of Miami, where he studied finance. He became a student manager for the Miami Hurricanes men's basketball team at the recommendation of his roommate and served as the team's head manager during his senior year.

== Coaching career ==
With the help of Miami head coach Jim Larrañaga and assistant Adam Fisher, Burgomaster was able to find a position as a graduate manager at Auburn after graduating from Miami in 2016. After one season he was offered a graduate assistant by head coach Bruce Pearl. He then worked as the assistant director of basketball operations from 2019 to 2021 and then as assistant to the head coach and recruiting coordinator.

Burgomaster was elevated to an assistant coaching position and named the Tigers' offensive coordinator prior to the start of the 2023-2024 season.
