= KeShawn Murphy =

American basketball player (born 2002)

Free agent
- Position: Power forward / small forward

Personal information
- Born: November 24, 2002 (age 23)
- Listed height: 6 ft 10 in (2.08 m)
- Listed weight: 230 lb (104 kg)

Career information
- High school: Ramsay (Birmingham, Alabama)
- College: Mississippi State (2021–2025); Auburn (2025–2026)
- NBA draft: 2026: undrafted
- Playing career: 2026–present

Career highlights
- NIT champion (2026)
- Stats at NBA.com
- Stats at Basketball Reference

KeShawn Murphy (born November 24, 2002) is an American basketball player who is a free agent. He played college basketball for the Mississippi State Bulldogs and Auburn Tigers.

== College career ==
Murphy originally committed to the Western Kentucky Hilltoppers. He flipped his commitment to Mississippi State in November 2020.

=== Mississippi State ===
Murphy was placed on a redshirt during his freshman season. In the 2023–24 season, Murphy returned from an absence in the middle of a two-game losing streak for Mississippi State. In the two matches following his return, he scored ten points against Georgia and a career-high eighteen points against North Texas. After entering the transfer portal in 2024 and staying with Mississippi State, Murphy entered the transfer portal for the second time in April 2025.

=== Auburn ===
Murphy committed to Auburn on April 15, 2025. He was injured during an exhibition match in October against Oklahoma State. After missing the first two matches of the season, he was cleared to return against Houston. He made his return to face his former team, Mississippi State, in February 2026. Against the Kentucky Wildcats, Murphy helped Auburn end their five-game losing streak by scoring 25 points in the game. After the team lost in the SEC tournament, Murphy opted out of the 2026 National Invitation Tournament, marking the end of his college career.

== Professional career ==
After going undrafted in the 2026 NBA draft, on September 18, 2026, Murphy signed an Exhibit 10 contract with the Washington Wizards, but was later waived by the Washington Wizards on 27th September, 2026.
