= Tahaad Pettiford =

American basketball player

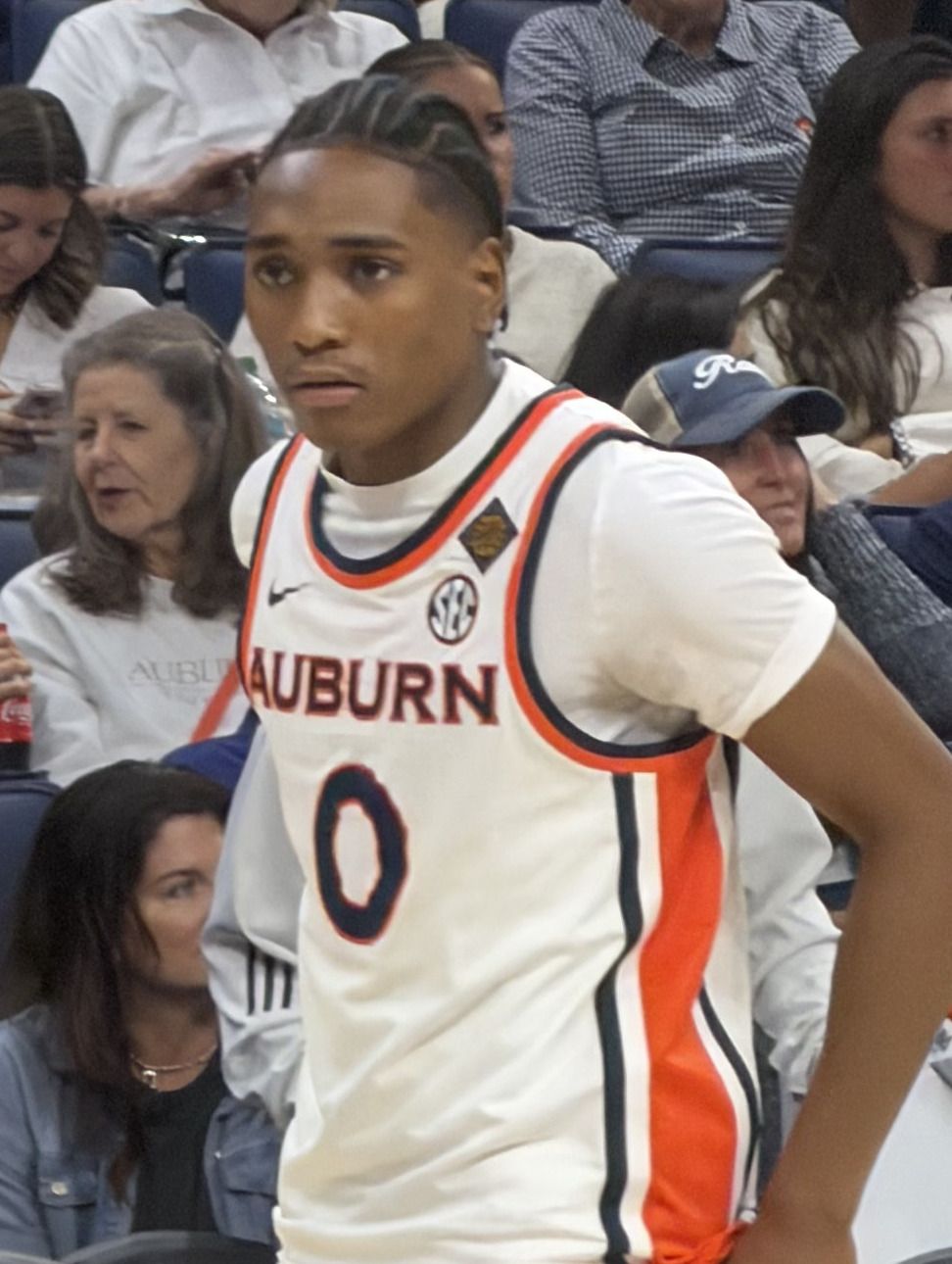
- Pettiford in 2026

No. 0 – Auburn Tigers
- Position: Point guard
- League: Southeastern Conference

Personal information
- Born: August 4, 2005 (age 21)
- Listed height: 6 ft 1 in (1.85 m)
- Listed weight: 170 lb (77 kg)

Career information
- High school: Hudson Catholic (Jersey City, New Jersey)
- College: Auburn (2024–present)

Career highlights
- NIT champion (2026); SEC All-Freshman Team (2025); McDonald's All-American (2024); Jordan Brand Classic (2024)

Tahaad Alexander Pettiford (born August 4, 2005) is an American college basketball player for the Auburn Tigers of the Southeastern Conference (SEC). He was a consensus four-star recruit and one of the top players in the 2024 class.

== Early life and high school career ==
Pettiford grew up in Jersey City, New Jersey, and attended Hudson Catholic Regional High School. He played in only three games during his junior year before suffering a season-ending injury. Pettiford averaged over 19 points per game as a senior. He was selected to play in the 2024 McDonald's All-American Game.

=== Recruiting ===
Pettiford was a consensus four-star recruit and one of the top players in the 2024 class, according to major recruiting services. On February 1, 2023, he committed to playing college basketball for Auburn over offers from Seton Hall, Ole Miss, Kansas, Kentucky, UConn, and UCLA.

College recruiting
Name	Hometown	School	Height	Weight	Commit date
Tahaad Pettiford; PG	Jersey City, NJ	Hudson Catholic (NJ)	6 ft 1 in (1.85 m)	170 lb (77 kg)	Feb 1, 2023
Tahaad Pettiford; PG	Recruit ratings: Rivals: 247Sports: On3: ESPN: (88)				
Overall recruit ranking: Rivals: 24 247Sports: 29 On3: 44 ESPN: 35
Note: In many cases, Scout, Rivals, 247Sports, On3, and ESPN may conflict in their listings of height and weight.; In these cases, the average was taken. ESPN grades are on a 100-point scale.; Sources: "Auburn 2024 Basketball Commitments". Rivals.; "2024 Auburn Tigers Recruiting Class". ESPN.; "2024 Team Ranking". Rivals.

== College career ==
Pettiford entered his freshman season with the Auburn Tigers as a backup at guard. He scored 21 points with three assists and three rebounds coming off the bench in the Tigers' 74–69 win over fourth-ranked Houston.

Pettiford entered his sophomore year with the Auburn Tigers as a starting guard. He reached 30 points against #2 Arizona and 27 points with 4 rebounds and 3 steals in the Tigers' 85–74 win over #14 St. John's. Pettiford averaged 15.4 points and 3.8 assists per game, helping lead Auburn to the NIT title.

== Career statistics ==
Legend
GP	Games played	GS	Games started	MPG	Minutes per game
FG%	Field goal percentage	3P%	3-point field goal percentage	FT%	Free throw percentage
RPG	Rebounds per game	APG	Assists per game	SPG	Steals per game
BPG	Blocks per game	PPG	Points per game	**Bold**	Career high

=== College ===
Year	Team	GP	GS	MPG	FG%	3P%	FT%	RPG	APG	SPG	BPG	PPG
2024–25	Auburn	**38**	1	22.9	**.421**	**.366**	.804	2.2	3.0	.9	.2	11.6
2025–26	Auburn	**38**	**36**	**32.3**	.393	.290	**.825**	**3.0**	**3.8**	**1.1**	**.6**	**15.4**
Career		76	37	27.6	.404	.323	.817	2.6	3.4	1.0	.4	13.5
