= Steven Pearl =

American basketball coach (born 1987)

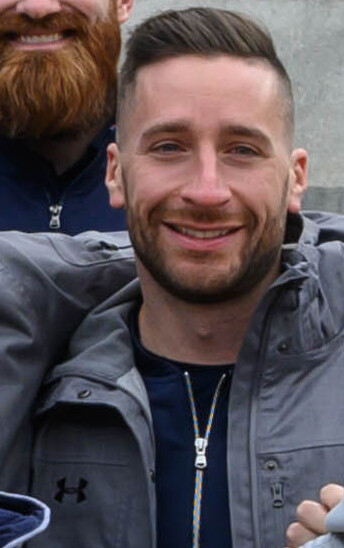
- Pearl in 2019

Current position
- Title: Head coach
- Team: Auburn
- Conference: SEC
- Record: 26–19 (.578)

Biographical details
- Born: September 14, 1987 (age 39); Iowa City, Iowa, U.S.

Playing career
- 2007–2011: Tennessee

Coaching career (HC unless noted)
- 2017–2023: Auburn (assistant)
- 2023–2025: Auburn (assoc. HC)
- 2025–present: Auburn

Administrative career (AD unless noted)
- 2014–2015: Auburn (assistant S&C)
- 2015–2017: Auburn (DBO)

Head coaching record
- Overall: 26–19 (.578)
- Tournaments: 5–0 (NIT)

Accomplishments and honors

Championships
- NIT champion (2026)

Steven Richard Pearl (born September 14, 1987) is an American college basketball coach who is currently the head men's basketball coach at Auburn.

== Early life and playing career ==
Pearl is the son of former Auburn head basketball coach Bruce Pearl. He initially attended Nicolet High School in Glendale, Wisconsin while his father was the head coach of the Milwaukee Panthers and transferred to West High School in Knoxville, Tennessee before his senior year. He was named first team All-State after averaging 21.3 points, 8.8 rebounds, and 2.6 assists per game during his senior year.

Pearl played for his father at Tennessee. He played in 101 games for the Volunteers over four seasons after redshirting his true freshman season. After graduation, Pearl worked as a medical sales representative at Stryker Corporation for three years.

== Coaching career ==
=== Assistant coach (2014–2025) ===
Pearl left Stryker in 2014 to join his father's staff at Auburn as an assistant strength and conditioning coach and served as the Tigers' director of basketball operations from 2015 to 2017. Pearl was promoted to an on-court assistant position in 2017.

On December 14, 2021, Pearl served as acting head coach for a game against North Alabama while his father was concluding a two-game NCAA suspension. The Tigers won by a score of 70–44, giving the younger Pearl his first victory as a collegiate head coach.

In August 2023, Pearl was promoted to associate head coach and given the responsibility of coordinating the Tigers' defense. With Pearl as defensive coordinator, Auburn finished both the 2023–24 and 2024–25 seasons ranked in the top 10 nationally for adjusted defensive efficiency, according to college basketball analytics website KenPom. These defensive metrics contributed to Auburn winning the 2024 SEC tournament, the 2025 SEC regular season championship, and the 2025 NCAA Tournament South Regional Final.

=== Head coach (2025–present) ===
In September 2025, Pearl took over as Auburn's head coach following his father's retirement. He is on a five-year contract, receiving a base salary of $3 million annually.

On November 3, 2025, Auburn defeated Bethune–Cookman by a score of 95–90 in overtime in the first regular season game of the 2025–26 season, giving Pearl his first win as full-time head coach. Pearl's first SEC victory came on January 10, 2026, when the Tigers defeated No. 15 Arkansas, 95–73. On January 24, Pearl's Tigers upset the defending national champion No. 16 Florida Gators on the road by a score of 76–67, snapping a 30-year drought of Auburn victories in Gainesville.

After starting the season 14–7 and 5–3 in the SEC, Auburn struggled down the stretch. The Tigers lost 9 of their final 12 games and had an overall record of 17–16 following the conclusion of the SEC tournament. Auburn was not selected for the 2026 NCAA tournament. This marked the first time the Tigers did not appear in the NCAA tournament since the 2020–21 season (and the first full season in which they missed the tournament since 2016–17).

Auburn accepted a bid to appear in the 2026 National Invitation Tournament, their first appearance in the NIT since 2009. As the NIT's top overall seed, Auburn won three consecutive games at home in Neville Arena over South Alabama, 4-seed Seattle, and 2-seed Nevada to advance to the NIT semifinals for the first time in program history. In the semifinal game at Hinkle Fieldhouse against 4-seed Illinois State, Auburn cruised to an 88–66 victory. In the NIT championship game at Gainbridge Fieldhouse, Auburn prevailed over fellow 1-seed Tulsa in overtime by a score of 92–86.

Auburn's final record for the season was 22–16, featuring the most wins by a first-year Auburn head men's basketball coach and the first NIT championship in program history.

== Head coaching record ==
Record table
Season	Team	Overall	Conference	Standing	Postseason
Auburn Tigers (Southeastern Conference) (2021)
2021–22	Auburn	1–0*	0–0		
Auburn Tigers (Southeastern Conference) (2025–present)
2025–26	Auburn	22–16	7–11	T–11th	NIT Champion
2026–27	Auburn	3–3	0–0		
Auburn:		26–19 (.578)	7–11 (.389)		
Total:		26–19 (.578)			
National champion Postseason invitational champion Conference regular season champion Conference regular season and conference tournament champion Division regular season champion Division regular season and conference tournament champion Conference tournament champion

- In December 2021, Bruce Pearl received a two-game suspension as part of sanctions imposed on Auburn by the NCAA due to former assistant Chuck Person's involvement in the 2017–18 NCAA Division I men's basketball corruption scandal. Wes Flanigan served as acting head coach during a 99–68 win over Nebraska on December 11. Steven Pearl then served as acting head coach during a 70–44 win over North Alabama on December 14.
