= 2026 NBA Summer League =

- League: National Basketball Association
- Sport: Basketball
- Duration: July 9–19
- Games: 76 total games
- Teams: California Classic-7; Salt Lake City-4; Las Vegas-30
- TV partner(s): ESPN, NBA TV (Utah and California games only)
- Streaming partner(s): Amazon Prime Video, ESPN DTC

California Classic
- Season champions: Sacramento Kings
- Runners-up: Golden State Warriors (Gold)
- Top scorer: Darius Acuff Jr.

Salt Lake City Summer League
- Season champions: Utah Jazz
- Runners-up: Atlanta Hawks
- Top scorer: Darryn Peterson

Las Vegas NBA Summer League
- Season champions: Golden State Warriors
- Runners-up: Memphis Grizzlies
- Season MVP: Yaxel Lendeborg (Both championship game MVP and Summer League MVP)
- Top scorer: Meleek Thomas
- Finals venue: Thomas & Mack Center, Paradise, Nevada

NBA Summer League seasons
- ← 2025 2027 →

The 2026 NBA Summer League was an off-season competition held by the National Basketball Association (NBA) primarily at the Thomas and Mack Center and Cox Pavilion in Las Vegas, Nevada, on the campus of University of Nevada, Las Vegas from July 9 to 19, 2026. The summer league consisted of the California Classic, Salt Lake City Summer League, and the Las Vegas NBA Summer League.

== California Classic ==
The Sacramento Kings and Golden State Warriors host the eighth annual California Classic at the Golden 1 Center and Chase Center. The games in Sacramento took place on July 4–6 while the games in San Francisco took place on July 3, 5, and 6.

=== Teams ===
- Brooklyn Nets
- Golden State Warriors (Split into “Gold” and “Blue” teams)
- Los Angeles Lakers
- Miami Heat
- Milwaukee Bucks
- Sacramento Kings
- San Antonio Spurs

=== Games ===
==== Day 1 ====
ESPN, NBA TV, Prime

July 3
5:00 PM PDT

Boxscore

Miami Heat 88, San Antonio Spurs 87
Scoring by quarter: 25–16, 18–20, 22–23, 23–28
Pts: Conwell, Young 21 each Rebs: Goldin, Keels 7 each Asts: Jahmir Young 3	Pts: Miles Kelly 16; Rebs: Tarris Reed Jr. 7 Asts: Ja'Kobi Gillespie 8

Chase Center, San Francisco, California
Referees: Kastine Evans, Erik Aellig, Cameron Garber

ESPNU, NBA TV, Prime

July 3
7:30 PM PDT

Boxscore

Los Angeles Lakers 72, Golden State Warriors Gold 104
Scoring by quarter: 23–28, 10–29, 19–29, 20–18
Pts: Cameron Carr 19; Rebs: Arthur Kaluma 6 Asts: Jon Elmore 7	Pts: Yaxel Lendeborg 19; Rebs: Lendeborg, Olbrich 5 each Asts: Yaxel Lendeborg 6

Chase Center, San Francisco, California
Referees: Italo Araujo, Julian McFadde, Erica Parker

==== Day 2 ====
NBA TV, ESPN+, Prime

July 4
12:00 PM PDT

Boxscore

Milwaukee Bucks 97, Golden State Warriors Blue 83
Scoring by quarter: 18–25, 25–20, 34–13, 20–25
Pts: Brandon Boston Jr. 17; Rebs: Marković, Travers 7 each Asts: Kira Lewis Jr. 5	Pts: RJ Nembhard 15; Rebs: Jones, Moni 6 each Asts: Boyd, Jones, Nembhard 3 each

Golden 1 Center, Sacramento, California
Referees: Kenny Gardner, Jafar Kinsey, William McClatchy

NBA TV, ESPN+, Prime

July 4
2:00 PM PDT

Boxscore

Brooklyn Nets 76, Sacramento Kings 79
Scoring by quarter: 21–10, 16–27, 20–19, 19–23
Pts: Egor Dëmin 23; Rebs: Chaney Johnson 9 Asts: Johnson, Powell 2 each	Pts: Darius Acuff Jr. 25; Rebs: Dylan Cardwell 9 Asts: Darius Acuff Jr. 4

Golden 1 Center, Sacramento, California
Referees: Ian McClenny, Lars Murray, Ashley Olsen

==== Day 3 ====
NBA TV, ESPN+, Prime

July 5
12:00 PM PDT

Boxscore

Brooklyn Nets 89, Milwaukee Bucks 69
Scoring by quarter: 29–24, 27–12, 16–18, 17–15
Pts: Humrichous, Sallis 15 each Rebs: Duke Brennan 12; Asts: Hunter Sallis 6	Pts: Brandon Boston 18; Rebs: Kobe Stewart 8 Asts: Kira Lewis Jr. 4

Golden 1 Center, Sacramento, California
Referees: Ashley Olsen, Kenny Gardber, Jafar Kinsey

ESPN, Prime

July 5
1:30 PM PDT

Boxscore

Miami Heat 91, Los Angeles Lakers 93 (2OT)
Scoring by quarter: 26–17, 23–22, 25–25, 13–23, Overtime: 4–4, 0–2
Pts: Conwell, Keels 16 each Rebs: Ryan Conwell 7 Asts: Tre Donaldson 4	Pts: Cameron Carr 26; Rebs: Anton Watson 10; Asts: William Hickey 7

Chase Center, San Francisco, California
Referees: Julian McFadden, Erik Aellig, Cameron Garber

NBA TV, ESPN+, Prime

July 5
2:00 PM PDT

Boxscore

Golden State Warriors Blue 85, Sacramento Kings 91
Scoring by quarter: 22–16, 30–26, 19–28, 14–21
Pts: Jacksen Moni 18; Rebs: Nick Boyd 6 Asts: Nick Boyd 10	Pts: Sharp, Stevens 18 each Rebs: Marquel Sutton 8 Asts: Flagler, Stevens 4 each

Golden 1 Center, Sacramento, California
Referees: Ian McClenny, Bill McClatchy, Lars Murray

NBA TV, ESPN+, Prime

July 5
4:00 PM PDT

Boxscore

San Antonio Spurs 69, Golden State Warriors Gold 98
Scoring by quarter: 15–24, 11–21, 20–27, 23–26
Pts: Emanuel Miller 12; Rebs: Emanuel Miller 6 Asts: Brown, Davis 4 each	Pts: Lachlan Olbrich 13; Rebs: Malevy Leons 9 Asts: Olbrich, Smith 4 each

Chase Center, San Francisco, California
Referees: Italo Araujo, Kastine Evans, Erica Parker

==== Day 4 ====
ESPNU, Prime

July 6
4:30 PM PDT

Boxscore

Los Angeles Lakers 88, San Antonio Spurs 84
Scoring by quarter: 15–21, 23–25, 27–16, 23–22
Pts: Chris Mañon 24; Rebs: Chris Mañon 8 Asts: William Hickey 5	Pts: Ja'Kobi Gillespie 19; Rebs: Tarris Reed Jr. 12; Asts: Ja'Kobi Gillespie 6

Chase Center, San Francisco, California
Referees: Cameron Garber, Kastine Evans, Erica Parker

NBA TV, ESPN+, Prime

July 6
5:00 PM PDT

Boxscore

Golden State Warriors Blue 79, Brooklyn Nets 100
Scoring by quarter: 28–24, 18–22, 16–15, 17–29
Pts: Nembhard, Tyson 14 each Rebs: Moni, Nembhard, Settle 4 each Asts: Nick Boyd 5	Pts: Egor Dëmin 23; Rebs: Egor Dëmin 8 Asts: Ben Saraf 7

Golden 1 Center, Sacramento, California
Referees: Ian McClenny., Bill McClatchy, Jafar Kinsey, Ashley Olsen

NBA TV, ESPN+, Prime

July 6
7:00 PM PDT

Boxscore

Miami Heat 95, Golden State Warriors Gold 85
Scoring by quarter: 24–16, 35–13, 17–30, 19–26
Pts: Ryan Conwell 26; Rebs: J'Vonne Hadley 10; Asts: Donaldson, Johnson 6 each	Pts: Lachlan Olbrich 21; Rebs: Deivon Smith 9 Asts: Deivon Smith 5

Chase Center, San Francisco, California
Referees: Julian McFadden, Erik Aellig, Italo Araujo

ESPNU, Prime

July 6
7:00 PM PDT

Boxscore

Milwaukee Bucks 89, Sacramento Kings 95
Scoring by quarter: 22–28, 26–27, 18–19, 23–21
Pts: Zack Austin 17; Rebs: Bogoljub Marković 9 Asts: Bogoljub Marković 5	Pts: Marquel Sutton 24; Rebs: Dylan Cardwell 12; Asts: Darius Acuff Jr. 3

Golden 1 Center, Sacramento, California
Referees: Kenny Gardner, Lars Murray, Ashley Olsen

== Salt Lake City Summer League ==
The Utah Jazz hosted a round-robin tournament at the Jon M. Huntsman Center on July 4, 6, and 7.

=== Teams ===
- Atlanta Hawks
- Memphis Grizzlies
- Oklahoma City Thunder
- Utah Jazz

=== Games ===
==== Day 1 ====
ESPNU, Prime

July 4
1:00 PM MDT

Boxscore

Memphis Grizzlies 111, Oklahoma City Thunder 74
Scoring by quarter: 33–22, 33–22, 19–8, 26–22
Pts: Olivier-Maxence Prosper 17; Rebs: Cedric Coward 8 Asts: Javon Small 9	Pts: Barnhizer, Sandfort 13 each Rebs: Brooks Barnhizer 6 Asts: Mara, Stirtz 4

Jon M. Huntsman Center, Salt Lake City, Utah
Referees: Klajdi Mulla, Cameron Gelinas, Evan Singletary

ESPNU, Prime

July 4
3:00 PM MDT

Boxscore

Atlanta Hawks 102, Utah Jazz 103 (OT)
Scoring by quarter: 20–24, 23–25, 27–29, 25–17, Overtime: 7–8
Pts: Madsen, Newell 15 each Rebs: Zuby Ejiofor 11; Asts: Kingston Flemings 9	Pts: Darryn Peterson 28; Rebs: Kylor Kelley 10; Asts: Max Abmas 6

Jon M. Huntsman Center, Salt Lake City, Utah
Referees: Julian Scott, Ashley Birch, Austin Spiker

==== Day 2 ====
ESPN, Prime

July 6
5:00 PM MDT

Boxscore

Atlanta Hawks 82, Oklahoma City Thunder 77
Scoring by quarter: 11–26, 25–17, 25–15, 21–19
Pts: Zuby Ejiofor 19; Rebs: Zuby Ejiofor 15; Asts: Kingston Flemings 5	Pts: Payton Sandfort 25; Rebs: Brooks Barnhizer 13; Asts: Barnhizer, Stirtz 3 each

Jon M. Huntsman Center, Salt Lake City, Utah
Referees: Ashley Birch, Austin Spiker, Klajdi Klajdi Mulla

ESPN, Prime

July 6
7:00 PM MDT

Boxscore

Memphis Grizzlies 100, Utah Jazz 109
Scoring by quarter: 23–24, 29–29, 23–24, 25–32
Pts: Cedric Coward 23; Rebs: Cameron Boozer 7 Asts: Javon Small 6	Pts: Darryn Peterson 25; Rebs: Cody Williams 8 Asts: Darryn Peterson 12

Jon M. Huntsman Center, Salt Lake City, Utah
Referees: Julian Scott, Cameron Gelinas, Evan Singletary

==== Day 3 ====
ESPNU, NBA TV, Prime

July 7
5:00 PM MDT

Boxscore

Atlanta Hawks 96, Memphis Grizzlies 82
Scoring by quarter: 28–15, 19–21, 20–26, 29–20
Pts: Devon Higgs 22; Rebs: Jacob Toppin 9 Asts: RayJ Dennis 7	Pts: Brendan Hausen 21; Rebs: Jevon Porter 10; Asts: Cleveland, Jestin Porter 3 each

Jon M. Huntsman Center, Salt Lake City, Utah
Referees: Julian Scott, Ashley Birch, Evan Singletary

ESPNU, NBA TV, Prime

July 7
7:00 PM MDT

Boxscore

Oklahoma City Thunder 69, Utah Jazz 103
Scoring by quarter: 16–30, 21–23, 15–26, 17–24
Pts: Ashworth, Dix 16 each Rebs: Brooks Barnhizer 10; Asts: Sandfort, Tilly 3 each	Pts: Jonas Aidoo 16; Rebs: Jonas Aidoo 14; Asts: Bez Mbeng 7

Jon M. Huntsman Center, Salt Lake City, Utah
Referees: Austin Spiker, Klajdi Mulla, Cameron Gelinas

== Las Vegas Summer League ==
The Las Vegas NBA Summer League is an official summer league of the NBA—the eighteenth year it has been held. The league played games across two venues: the Thomas and Mack Center and Cox Pavilion, both located in Paradise, Nevada, which is near Las Vegas.

=== Format ===
- Number of Games: A total of 76 games will be played, each team will play at least five games, and each team will play four games from July 9–16.
- Four-Team Tournament: After each team plays four games, the top four teams will advance to the playoffs and participate in a semifinal game on July 18, and the two semifinal game winners will participate in the championship game on July 19. The top four playoff seeds will be determined by winning percentage with tiebreakers set forth below.
- Consolation Games: The 26 teams that did not advance to the four-team playoff will play a fifth game from July 17–19

==== Tiebreak criteria ====
1. Two Teams Tied – In the case of a tie in preliminary round records involving only two teams, the following criteria, in order, were utilized:

• Head-to-head matchup: The team that won the game between the two teams in the preliminary round, if applicable, receives the higher seed.

• Point differential: The team with the greater point differential receives the higher seed.

• Total Points: The team with the most total points will receive the higher seed

- Random drawing: If necessary, the higher seed will be determined by a "coin flip".

2. More Than Two Teams Tied – In the case of a tie in preliminary round records involving more than two teams, the following criteria, in order, were utilized:

• Point differential: The team with the greater point differential receives the higher seed.

• Total Points: The team with the most total points will receive the higher seed

• Random drawing: The higher seed shall be determined by a “coin flip.”

=== Teams ===
- Atlanta Hawks
- Boston Celtics
- Brooklyn Nets
- Charlotte Hornets
- Chicago Bulls
- Cleveland Cavaliers
- Dallas Mavericks
- Detroit Pistons
- Denver Nuggets
- Golden State Warriors
- Houston Rockets
- Indiana Pacers
- Los Angeles Clippers
- Los Angeles Lakers
- Memphis Grizzlies
- Miami Heat
- Milwaukee Bucks
- Minnesota Timberwolves
- New Orleans Pelicans
- New York Knicks
- Oklahoma City Thunder
- Orlando Magic
- Philadelphia 76ers
- Phoenix Suns
- Portland Trail Blazers
- Sacramento Kings
- San Antonio Spurs
- Toronto Raptors
- Utah Jazz
- Washington Wizards

=== Games ===
==== Day 1 ====
Prime

July 9
12:30 PM PDT

Boxscore

Minnesota Timberwolves 105, New Orleans Pelicans 92
Scoring by quarter: 24–25, 22–21, 26–25, 33–21
Pts: Zyon Pullin 24; Rebs: Joan Beringer 11; Asts: Zyon Pullin 12	Pts: Kobe Bufkin 30; Rebs: Nate Mensah 7 Asts: Markquis Nowell 6

Cox Pavilion, Las Vegas, Nevada
Referees: Jenna Reneau, Dannica Baroody, Cisil Gungor

ESPN2

July 9
1:30 PM PDT

Boxscore

San Antonio Spurs 66, Atlanta Hawks 93
Scoring by quarter: 15–27, 17–23, 19–21, 15–22
Pts: Tarris Reed Jr. 14; Rebs: Tarris Reed Jr. 10; Asts: Ja'Kobi Gillespie 6	Pts: Asa Newell 15; Rebs: Gabe Madsen 7 Asts: Kingston Flemings 8

Thomas & Mack Center, Las Vegas, Nevada
Referees: Simone Jelks, Ashley Gloss, Waseem Husainy

Prime

July 9
2:30 PM PDT

Boxscore

Detroit Pistons 93, Philadelphia 76ers 101
Scoring by quarter: 25–30, 22–27, 26–22, 20–22
Pts: Isaac Jones 22; Rebs: Brice Williams 8 Asts: Allen, Okorie 4 each	Pts: Dante Maddox Jr. 21; Rebs: Johni Broome 13; Asts: Labaron Philon 7

Cox Pavilion, Las Vegas, Nevada
Referees: JD Ralls, Jenna Schroeder, Ruben Woolcock

ESPN

July 9
4:00 PM PDT

Boxscore

Golden State Warriors 101, Dallas Mavericks 90
Scoring by quarter: 24–20, 35–19, 20–27, 22–24
Pts: LJ Cryer 25; Rebs: Yaxel Lendeborg 10; Asts: Will Richard 7	Pts: Morez Johnson 27; Rebs: Morez Johnson 8 Asts: Ryan Nembhard 11

Thomas & Mack Center, Las Vegas, Nevada
Referees: Eric Lewis, Tyler Ricks, Ariadna Chueca

Prime

July 9
4:30 PM PDT

Boxscore

Charlotte Hornets 86, Orlando Magic 74
Scoring by quarter: 13–21, 24–22, 25–15, 24–16
Pts: Liam McNeeley 28; Rebs: Hannes Steinbach 11; Asts: Ryan Kalkbrenner 5	Pts: Noah Penda 23; Rebs: Noah Penda 7 Asts: Quiñones, Richardson II 4 each

Cox Pavilion, Las Vegas, Nevada
Referees: Pat O'Connell, Jessyca Christopher, Petar Pesic

ESPN

July 9
6:00 PM PDT

Boxscore

Utah Jazz 88, Washington Wizards 92
Scoring by quarter: 18–27, 19–27, 25–16, 26–22
Pts: Darryn Peterson 24; Rebs: Orlando Robinson 6 Asts: Max Abmas 5	Pts: AJ Dybantsa 27; Rebs: AJ Dybantsa 7 Asts: Seth Trimble 3

Thomas & Mack Center, Las Vegas, Nevada
Referees: J.T. Orr, Scott Twardoski, Julys Guzman

ESPN

July 9
8:00 PM PDT

Boxscore

Sacramento Kings 91, Los Angeles Clippers 85
Scoring by quarter: 20–22, 24–19, 26–17, 21–27
Pts: Emanuel Sharp 21; Rebs: Dylan Cardwell 9 Asts: Darius Acuff Jr. 7	Pts: Cam Christie 15; Rebs: Cam Christie 8 Asts: Kobe Sanders 4

Thomas & Mack Center, Las Vegas, Nevada
Referees: Suyash Mehta, Monnazjea Finney-Smithy, Emily Murphy

==== Day 2 ====
Prime

July 10
1:00 PM PDT

Boxscore

Milwaukee Bucks 86, Miami Heat 119
Scoring by quarter: 31–26, 25–30, 7–29, 23–34
Pts: Brayden Burries 18; Rebs: Cormac Ryan 8 Asts: Kasparas Jakučionis 6	Pts: Conwell, Young 19 each Rebs: Tre White 10; Asts: Jahmir Young 7

Thomas & Mack Center, Las Vegas, Nevada
Referees: Che Flores, Biniam Maru, Sarah Williams

ESPN2

July 10
1:30 PM PDT

Boxscore

Cleveland Cavaliers 93, Indiana Pacers 99
Scoring by quarter: 14–11, 27–32, 15–32, 37–24
Pts: Thomas, Tomlin 20 each Rebs: Nae'Qwan Tomlin 6 Asts: Nae'Qwan Tomlin 4	Pts: Kinsey, Mast 16 each Rebs: Rienk Mast 11; Asts: Jalen Slawson 5

Cox Pavilion, Las Vegas, Nevada
Referees: Ajay Gonnelli, Rachael Wood, Shem Rivera

Prime

July 10
3:00 PM PDT

Boxscore

Brooklyn Nets 91, New York Knicks 65
Scoring by quarter: 15–16, 23–17, 30–9, 23–23
Pts: Brown Jr., Dëmin 20 each Rebs: Chaney Johnson 9 Asts: Brown Jr., Wolf 3 each	Pts: Pacôme Dadiet 20; Rebs: Pacôme Dadiet 7 Asts: Dillon Jones 4

Thomas & Mack Center, Las Vegas, Nevada
Referees: Matt Myers, Gerda Gatling, Daron Harris

ESPN2

July 10
3:30 PM PDT

Boxscore

Houston Rockets 97, Denver Nuggets 86
Scoring by quarter: 20–20, 25–17, 23–30, 29–19
Pts: Bruce Thornton 27; Rebs: Oscar Cluff 9 Asts: Isaiah Crawford 4	Pts: Bryce Hopkins 24; Rebs: Trevon Brazile 11; Asts: KJ Simpson 9

Cox Pavilion, Las Vegas, Nevada
Referees: Catherine Chang, Joe Prince, Liszka Wojtek

Prime

July 10
5:00 PM PDT

Boxscore

Chicago Bulls 96, Memphis Grizzlies 97
Scoring by quarter: 17–23, 28–28, 23–28, 28–18
Pts: Caleb Wilson 35; Rebs: Malik Williams 7 Asts: Kennedy Chandler 5	Pts: Cameron Boozer 23; Rebs: Cedric Coward 10; Asts: Cedric Coward 10

Thomas & Mack Center, Las Vegas, Nevada
Referees: John Conley, Jason Alabanza, Xiao Zhang

ESPN

July 10
6:00 PM PDT

Boxscore

Boston Celtics 83, Toronto Raptors 80 (OT)
Scoring by quarter: 14–16, 12–18, 28–20, 23–23, Overtime: 6–3
Pts: Amari Williams 23; Rebs: Amari Williams 13; Asts: Hugo González 8	Pts: Allen Graves 22; Rebs: Allen Graves 13; Asts: Burnett, Hepburn 5 each

Cox Pavilion, Las Vegas, Nevada
Referees: Brent Haskill, Ashley Olson, John Schellhase III

Prime

July 10
7:00 PM PDT

Boxscore

Oklahoma City Thunder 84, Los Angeles Lakers 96
Scoring by quarter: 23–24, 20–29, 23–33, 18–10
Pts: Bennett Stirtz 18; Rebs: Brooks Barnhizer 10; Asts: Barnhizer, Johnson, Pritchard, Sandfort 2 each	Pts: Adou Thiero 20; Rebs: William Hickey 7 Asts: Chris Mañon 5

Thomas & Mack Center, Las Vegas, Nevada
Referees: Brandon Adair, Robert Hussey, Genesis Perrymond

ESPNU

July 10
8:00 PM PDT

Boxscore

Portland Trail Blazers 79, Phoenix Suns 81
Scoring by quarter: 19–10, 19–14, 18–31, 23–26
Pts: DJ Steward 21; Rebs: Yang Hansen 9 Asts: Yang Hansen 4	Pts: Javonte Cooke 21; Rebs: Khaman Maluach 11; Asts: Darius Brown II 7

Cox Pavilion, Las Vegas, Nevada
Referees: Ashley Gloss, Matt Rafferty, Chelisa Painter

==== Day 3 ====
Prime

July 11
12:30 PM PDT

Boxscore

Miami Heat 88, Orlando Magic 93
Scoring by quarter: 25–26, 27–20, 18–33, 18–14
Pts: Trevor Keels 32; Rebs: J'Vonne Hadley 7 Asts: Jahmir Young 6	Pts: Castleton, Quiñones, Richardson II 15 each Rebs: Colin Castleton 8 Asts: Jase Richardson III 6

Cox Pavilion, Las Vegas, Nevada
Referees: Dannica Baroody, Jenna Renneau, Bobby Bissant

ESPN

July 11
1:00 PM PDT

Boxscore

New Orleans Pelicans 95, Charlotte Hornets 91
Scoring by quarter: 22–33, 23–23, 20–20, 30–15
Pts: Hunter Dickinson 21; Rebs: Kobe Bufkin 6 Asts: Markquis Nowell 6	Pts: Liam McNeeley 17; Rebs: Ajayi, Salaün 9 each Asts: Kylan Boswell 7

Thomas & Mack Center, Las Vegas, Nevada
Referees: Simone Jelks, Jacob Lear, Reihen Knysh

Prime

July 11
2:30 PM PDT

Boxscore

Indiana Pacers 93, Philadelphia 76ers 100 (OT)
Scoring by quarter: 27–31, 18–28, 22–21, 26–13, Overtime: 0–7
Pts: Jalen Slawson 26; Rebs: Rienk Mast 9 Asts: Braden Smith 5	Pts: Labaron Philon 24; Rebs: Johni Broome 11; Asts: Labaron Philon 6

Cox Pavilion, Las Vegas, Nevada
Referees: JD Ralls, Jenna Schroeder, Cisil Gungor

ESPN

July 11
3:00 PM PDT

Boxscore

New York Knicks 49, San Antonio Spurs 70
Scoring by quarter: 10–16, 7–23, 20–13, 12–18
Pts: Tyler Nickel 16; Rebs: Diawara, Kayil 5 each Asts: Jones, Kayil 3 each	Pts: Carter Bryant 19; Rebs: Tarris Reed Jr. 9 Asts: Ja'Kobi Gillespi 5

Thomas & Mack Center, Las Vegas, Nevada
Referees: Eric Lewis, Tyler Ricks, Ashley Olsen

Prime

July 11
4:30 PM PDT

Boxscore

Denver Nuggets 101, Minnesota Timberwolves 82
Scoring by quarter: 26–13, 26–26, 21–33, 28–10
Pts: KJ Simpson 19; Rebs: Hopkins, Jarreau 7 each Asts: KJ Simpson 4	Pts: Zyon Pullin 24; Rebs: Enrique Freeman 8 Asts: Pullin, Williams 3 each

Cox Pavilion, Las Vegas, Nevada
Referees: JP Primm, Pat O'Connell, Ruben Woolcock

ESPN

July 11
5:00 PM PDT

Boxscore

Atlanta Hawks 83, Brooklyn Nets 76
Scoring by quarter: 24–25, 17–21, 16–14, 26–16
Pts: Kobe Johnson 17; Rebs: Flemings, Johnson 7 each Asts: Kingston Flemings 5	Pts: Johnson, Wolf 20 each Rebs: Chaney Johnson 10; Asts: Ben Saraf 5

Thomas & Mack Center, Las Vegas, Nevada
Referees: J.T. Orr, Scott Twardoski, Ariadna Chueca

Prime

July 11
6:30 PM PDT

Boxscore

Houston Rockets 89, Toronto Raptors 102
Scoring by quarter: 21–19, 20–33, 28–17, 20–23
Pts: Tristen Newton 18; Rebs: Bruce Thornton 6 Asts: Bruce Thornton 6	Pts: Seth Lundy 23; Rebs: Jamarion Sharp 7 Asts: Chucky Hepburn 8

Cox Pavilion, Las Vegas, Nevada
Referees: Nate Cearley, Quincy Smith, Petar Pesic

ESPN

July 11
7:00 PM PDT

Boxscore

Los Angeles Lakers 91, Dallas Mavericks 70
Scoring by quarter: 21–19, 26–25, 20–13, 24–13
Pts: Arthur Kaluma 34; Rebs: Chris Mañon 8 Asts: Elmore, Okereke 5 each	Pts: Ryan Nembhard 12; Rebs: Johnson, Lawal 5 each Asts: Ryan Nembhard 5

Thomas & Mack Center, Las Vegas, Nevada
Referees: Suyash Mehta, Julys Guzman, Alicia Shivers

==== Day 4 ====
ESPN2

July 12
12:00 PM PDT

Boxscore

Phoenix Suns 75, New Orleans Pelicans 81
Scoring by quarter: 12–16, 19–25, 23–21, 21–19
Pts: Darius Brown II 18; Rebs: Khaman Maluach 15; Asts: Darius Brown II 4	Pts: Malik Dia 18; Rebs: Hunter Dickinson 8 Asts: Melvin Council Jr. 4

Cox Pavilion, Las Vegas, Nevada
Referees: Robert Hussey, Italo Araujo, Evan Singletary

Prime

July 12
1:00 PM PDT

Boxscore

Cleveland Cavaliers 94, Detroit Pistons 103
Scoring by quarter: 21–29, 28–30, 21–14, 24–30
Pts: Meleek Thomas 30; Rebs: Ernest Udeh Jr. 6 Asts: Meleek Thomas 7	Pts: Chaz Lanier 25; Rebs: Isaac Jones 10; Asts: Ebuka Okorie 6

Thomas & Mack Center, Las Vegas, Nevada
Referees: Biniam Maru, Catherine Chang, Joe Prince

ESPN2

July 12
2:00 PM PDT

Boxscore

Charlotte Hornets 75, Boston Celtics 87
Scoring by quarter: 21–17, 19–25, 16–21, 19–24
Pts: Liam McNeeley 20; Rebs: Liam McNeeley 8 Asts: Boswell, Brown Jr. 4 each	Pts: Dillon Mitchell 24; Rebs: Dillon Mitchell 8 Asts: Milos Uzan 6

Cox Pavilion, Las Vegas, Nevada
Referees: Che Flores, Lars Murray, Tommy Wu

Prime

July 12
3:00 PM PDT

Boxscore

Oklahoma City Thunder 79, Golden State Warriors 104
Scoring by quarter: 16–27, 22–26, 18–20, 23–31
Pts: Bennett Stirtz 13; Rebs: Aday Mara 9 Asts: Aday Mara 4	Pts: Boyd, Lendeborg, Olbrich 14 each Rebs: Malevy Leons 11; Asts: LJ Cryer 5

Thomas & Mack Center, Las Vegas, Nevada
Referees: Matt Myers, Sarah Williams, Fatri Abazi

ESPNU

July 12
4:00 PM PDT

Boxscore

Orlando Magic 112, Portland Trail Blazers 105 (OT)
Scoring by quarter: 23–33, 27–22, 21–16, 30–30, Overtime: 11–4
Pts: Lester Quiñones 30; Rebs: Lester Quiñones 8 Asts: TyTy Washington Jr. 7	Pts: Jayson Kent 20; Rebs: Carr, Kent 8 each Asts: DJ Steward 5

Cox Pavilion, Las Vegas, Nevada
Referees: Kaz Beverley, Gerda Gatling, Gerald Ayayi

Prime

July 12
5:00 PM PDT

Boxscore

Sacramento Kings 85, Washington Wizards 104
Scoring by quarter: 24–18, 17–36, 24–21, 20–29
Pts: Maxime Raynaud 20; Rebs: Maxime Raynaud 12; Asts: Acuff Jr., Cardwell, Clifford 4 each	Pts: Will Riley 32; Rebs: AJ Dybantsa 7 Asts: Beekman, Livingston 4 each

Thomas & Mack Center, Las Vegas, Nevada
Referees: John Conley, Genesis Perrymond, Xiao Zhang

ESPN

July 12
6:00 PM PDT

Boxscore

San Antonio Spurs 90, Milwaukee Bucks 80
Scoring by quarter: 25–10, 17–15, 17–22, 31–33
Pts: RJ Davis 20; Rebs: Maliq Brown 9 Asts: Maliq Brown 5	Pts: Brayden Burries 26; Rebs: Bogoljub Marković 6 Asts: Pete Nance 5

Cox Pavilion, Las Vegas, Nevada
Referees: Hortencia Sanchez-Carrizales, Ian McClenny, Liszka Wojtek

Prime

July 12
7:00 PM PDT

Boxscore

Los Angeles Clippers 104, Utah Jazz 82
Scoring by quarter: 19–13, 21–25, 42–18, 22–26
Pts: Keaton Wagler 23; Rebs: Norchad Omier 10; Asts: Jahmyl Telfort 5	Pts: Darryn Peterson 23; Rebs: Jonas Aidoo 10; Asts: Alexander, Peterson 5 each

Thomas & Mack Center, Las Vegas, Nevada
Referees: Jason Alabanza, Shem Rivera, Dein Dainja

==== Day 5 ====
Prime

July 13
1:00 PM PDT

Boxscore

Detroit Pistons 75, New York Knicks 86
Scoring by quarter: 24–20, 19–31, 21–17, 11–18
Pts: Chaz Lanier 24; Rebs: Isaac Jones 8 Asts: Ebuka Okorie 4	Pts: Jack Kayil 19; Rebs: Nick Jourdain 8 Asts: Jones, Kayil 4 each

Cox Pavilion, Las Vegas, Nevada
Referees: Klajdi Mulla, Rachael Wood, Cisil Gungor

ESPN2

July 13
1:30 PM PDT

Boxscore

Toronto Raptors 94, Indiana Pacers 93
Scoring by quarter: 26–16, 19–29, 25–24, 24–24
Pts: Seth Lundy 22; Rebs: Jamarion Sharp 9 Asts: Allen Graves 6	Pts: Rienk Mast 23; Rebs: Rienk Mast 10; Asts: Brandon Smith 9

Thomas & Mack Center, Las Vegas, Nevada
Referees: Julian Scott, Ryo Hasebe, Ashley Olsen

Prime

July 13
3:00 PM PDT

Boxscore

Atlanta Hawks 102, Boston Celtics 90
Scoring by quarter: 29–25, 23–14, 31–23, 19–28
Pts: Kobe Johnson 30; Rebs: Isaiah Wong 9 Asts: Isaac McKneely 5	Pts: Chris Cenac Jr. 16; Rebs: Cenac Jr., Pringle, Uzan 5 each Asts: Milos Uzan 4

Cox Pavilion, Las Vegas, Nevada
Referees: Kenny Gardner, William McClatchy, Ruben Woolcock

ESPN

July 13
4:00 PM PDT

Boxscore

Dallas Mavericks 96, Memphis Grizzlies 88
Scoring by quarter: 24–19, 26–27, 18–19, 28–23
Pts: Darin Green Jr. 18; Rebs: Jorge Diaz Graham 10; Asts: Sergio de Larrea 12	Pts: Cameron Boozer 21; Rebs: Cedric Coward 12; Asts: Coward, Mashack, Small 4 each

Thomas & Mack Center, Las Vegas, Nevada
Referees: Cameron Garber, Jafar Kinsey, Julys Guzman

Prime

July 13
5:00 PM PDT

Boxscore

Miami Heat 73, Cleveland Cavaliers 90
Scoring by quarter: 20–21, 16–26, 23–18, 14–25
Pts: Tre Donaldson 22; Rebs: Vladislav Goldin 8 Asts: Tre Donaldson 3	Pts: Meleek Thomas 35; Rebs: Ernest Udeh Jr. 7 Asts: Lee, Thomas, Udeh Jr. 3 each

Cox Pavilion, Las Vegas, Nevada
Referees: Erik Aellig, Jacob Budnik, Petar Pesic

ESPN

July 13
6:00 PM PDT

Boxscore

Chicago Bulls 63, Utah Jazz 80
Scoring by quarter: 18–22, 15–20, 10–12, 20–26
Pts: Caleb Wilson 19; Rebs: Awaka, Swain 9 each Asts: Buie, Chandler, Essengue, Williams, Wilson 2 each	Pts: Jonas Aidoo 17; Rebs: Jonas Aidoo 11; Asts: Hayden Gray 5

Thomas & Mack Center, Las Vegas, Nevada
Referees: Julian McFadden, Gina Catanzariti, Julys Guzman

Prime

July 13
7:00 PM PDT

Boxscore

Phoenix Suns 95, Milwaukee Bucks 88
Scoring by quarter: 19–22, 26–22, 24–16, 26–28
Pts: Khaman Maluach 21; Rebs: Khaman Maluach 10; Asts: Darius Brown II 5	Pts: Brayden Burries 23; Rebs: Burries, Marković 8 each Asts: Brayden Burries 6

Cox Pavilion, Las Vegas, Nevada
Referees: JP Primm, Quincy Smith, Daron Harris

ESPN2

July 13
8:00 PM PDT

Boxscore

Minnesota Timberwolves 84, Portland Trail Blazers 111
Scoring by quarter: 17–24, 27–34, 22–30, 18–23
Pts: Donavan Williams 21; Rebs: Enrique Freeman 7 Asts: Zyon Pullin 10	Pts: Chris Youngblood 20; Rebs: Yang Hansen 10; Asts: Yang Hansen 5

Thomas & Mack Center, Las Vegas, Nevada
Referees: Kastine Evans, Carlos Peralta-Ortega, Paulina Gajdosz

==== Day 6 ====
Prime

July 14
1:00 PM PDT

Boxscore

Philadelphia 76ers 64, Houston Rockets 90
Scoring by quarter: 8–17, 17–24, 19–24, 20–25
Pts: Labaron Philon 17; Rebs: Taye Fields 6 Asts: Labaron Philon 4	Pts: Isaiah Crawford 19; Rebs: Oscar Cluff 9 Asts: Bruce Thornton 4

Thomas & Mack Center, Las Vegas, Nevada
Referees: Lars Murray, Jacob Lear, Alicia Shivers

Prime

July 14
3:00 PM PDT

Boxscore

Sacramento Kings 83, Brooklyn Nets 115
Scoring by quarter: 18–38, 16–18, 29–30, 20–29
Pts: Darius Acuff Jr. 26; Rebs: Dylan Cardwell 7 Asts: Darius Acuff Jr. 5	Pts: Egor Dëmin 22; Rebs: Chaney Johnson 9 Asts: Egor Dëmin 8

Thomas & Mack Center, Las Vegas, Nevada
Referees: Nate Cearley, Liszka Wojtek, Gerald Ayayi

ESPN

July 14
4:00 PM PDT

Boxscore

Memphis Grizzlies 106, Golden State Warriors 85
Scoring by quarter: 22–24, 25–20, 29–13, 30–28
Pts: Javon Small 26; Rebs: Cameron Boozer 7 Asts: Javon Small 7	Pts: Yaxel Lendeborg 15; Rebs: Yaxel Lendeborg 9 Asts: Nick Boyd 5

Cox Pavilion, Las Vegas, Nevada
Referees: Ajay Gonnelli, Ashley Olson, Xiao Zhang

Prime

July 14
5:00 PM PDT

Boxscore

Washington Wizards 87, Chicago Bulls 99
Scoring by quarter: 21–15, 15–22, 23–29, 28–33
Pts: Chris Livingston (21); Rebs: Kadary Richmond (8); Asts: Agbakoko, Beekman, Nembhard, Richmond 3 each	Pts: Jaylin Sellers 24; Rebs: Tobe Awaka 10; Asts: Kennedy Chandler (5)

Thomas & Mack Center, Las Vegas, Nevada
Referees: Ashley Birch, Evan Singletary, Monnazjea Finney-Smithy

ESPN

July 14
6:00 PM PDT

Boxscore

Denver Nuggets 106, Oklahoma City Thunder 103
Scoring by quarter: 31–22, 29–29, 18–20, 28–32
Pts: Trevon Brazile 32; Rebs: Hopkins, Stevenson 7 each Asts: Erik Stevenson 4	Pts: Bennett Stirtz 22; Rebs: Brooks Barnhizer 11; Asts: Mara, Stirtz 6 each

Cox Pavilion, Las Vegas, Nevada
Referees: Cameron Gelinas, Kenneth Arrick II, Fatri Abazi

Prime

July 14
7:00 PM PDT

Boxscore

Los Angeles Clippers 85, Los Angeles Lakers 99
Scoring by quarter: 16–24, 22–30, 22–29, 25–16
Pts: Kobe Sanders 18; Rebs: Nick Martinelli 10; Asts: Keaton Wagler 4	Pts: Cameron Carr 23; Rebs: Chris Mañon 11; Asts: Peter Suder 5

Thomas & Mack Center, Las Vegas, Nevada
Referees: Austin Spiker, Jacob Lear, Reihen Knysh

==== Day 7 ====
Prime

July 15
12:30 PM PDT

Boxscore

Indiana Pacers 98, Minnesota Timberwolves 114
Scoring by quarter: 24–35, 27–27, 22–27, 25–25
Pts: Jalen Slawson 20; Rebs: Jalen Slawson 9 Asts: Braden Smith 8	Pts: Zyon Pullin 23; Rebs: Enrique Freeman 11; Asts: Zyon Pullin 6

Cox Pavilion, Las Vegas, Nevada
Referees: Chelisa Painter, Jacob Budnik, John Schellhase III

ESPNU

July 15
1:00 PM PDT

Boxscore

Orlando Magic 99, Philadelphia 76ers 92
Scoring by quarter: 30–17, 35–20, 16–26, 18–29
Pts: Jase Richardson II 25; Rebs: Alex Morales 10; Asts: Noah Penda 6	Pts: Amani Lyles 18; Rebs: Lyles, Philon Jr. 6 each Asts: Labaron Philon Jr. 6

Thomas & Mack Center, Las Vegas, Nevada
Referees: Matt Rafferty, Cameron Garber, Dein Dainja

Prime

July 15
2:30 PM PDT

Boxscore

New Orleans Pelicans 77, Cleveland Cavaliers 82
Scoring by quarter: 15–16, 18–15, 16–21, 28–30
Pts: Markquis Nowell 20; Rebs: Christian Shumate 9 Asts: Melvin Council Jr. 5	Pts: Malaki Branham 23; Rebs: Ernest Udeh Jr. 8 Asts: Branham, Lee, Minix 3 each

Cox Pavilion, Las Vegas, Nevada
Referees: Julian Scott, Kaz Beverley, Bobby Bissant

ESPNU

July 15
3:00 PM PDT

Boxscore

Phoenix Suns 100, Detroit Pistons 88
Scoring by quarter: 27–13, 26–33, 25–28, 22–14
Pts: Khaman Maluach 23; Rebs: Khaman Maluach 15; Asts: Darius Brown II 6	Pts: Brice Williams 24; Rebs: Isaac Jones 10; Asts: Ebuka Okorie 5

Thomas & Mack Center, Las Vegas, Nevada
Referees: Ryo Hasebe, Joe Prince, William McClatchy

Prime

July 15
4:30 PM PDT

Boxscore

Milwaukee Bucks 110, Charlotte Hornets 91
Scoring by quarter: 28–18, 25–19, 26–27, 31–27
Pts: Nate Ament 23; Rebs: Nate Ament 6 Asts: Kam Jones 9	Pts: Hannes Steinbach 27; Rebs: Hannes Steinbach 15; Asts: Christian Anderson Jr. 10

Cox Pavilion, Las Vegas, Nevada
Referees: Kenny Gardner, Jessyca Christopher, Carlos Peralta-Ortega

ESPN2

July 15
5:00 PM PDT

Boxscore

Boston Celtics 82, Sacramento Kings 76
Scoring by quarter: 13–4, 26–24, 18–21, 25–27
Pts: Hugo González 24; Rebs: Chris Cenac Jr. 12; Asts: Hugo González 5	Pts: Alex Karaban 21; Rebs: Jonathan Mogbo 11; Asts: Cardwell, Stevens 3 each

Thomas & Mack Center, Las Vegas, Nevada
Referees: Brent Haskill, Erik Aellig, Lance Gordon

Prime

July 15
6:30 PM PDT

Boxscore

Utah Jazz 82, San Antonio Spurs 94
Scoring by quarter: 18-24, 26-22, 20-30, 18-18
Pts: Tamar Bates 16; Rebs: Jonas Aidoo 9 Asts: Bez Mbeng 5	Pts: Ja'Kobi Gillespie 26; Rebs: R. J. Davis 12; Asts: Ja'Kobi Gillespie 5

Cox Pavilion, Las Vegas, Nevada
Referees: Jafar Kinsey, Tommy Wu, Paulina Gajdosz

ESPN

July 15
7:30 PM PDT

Boxscore

Washington Wizards 94, Los Angeles Clippers 108
Scoring by quarter: 25-25, 26-27, 19-30, 24-26
Pts: Seth Trimble 24; Rebs: Chris Livingston 9 Asts: Reece Beekman 9	Pts: Kobe Sanders 26; Rebs: Norchad Omier 15; Asts: Sean Pedulla 11

Thomas & Mack Center, Las Vegas, Nevada
Referees: Klajdi Mulla, Rachael Wood, Javed Trotman

==== Day 8 ====
Prime

July 16
1:00 PM PDT

Boxscore

Dallas Mavericks 97, Oklahoma City Thunder 87
Scoring by quarter: 24-20, 25-25, 28-18, 20-24
Pts: John Poulakidas 19; Rebs: Sergio de Larrea 9 Asts: Sergio de Larrea 14	Pts: Brooks Barnhizer 21; Rebs: Brooks Barnhizer 12; Asts: Steven Ashworth 5

Thomas & Mack Center, Las Vegas, Nevada
Referees: Cameron Gelinas, RJ Johnson, Emily Murphy

ESPNU

July 16
1:30 PM PDT

Boxscore

Brooklyn Nets 83, Houston Rockets 100
Scoring by quarter: 13-28, 21-21, 23-29, 26-22
Pts: Egor Dëmin 21; Rebs: Danny Wolf 8 Asts: Mikel Brown Jr. 4	Pts: Bruce Thornton 23; Rebs: Oscar Cluff 10; Asts: Daishen Nix 5

Cox Pavilion, Las Vegas, Nevada
Referees: Kastine Evans, Austin Spiker, Monnazjea Finney-Smithy

Prime

July 16
3:00 PM PDT

Boxscore

Los Angeles Lakers 105, Chicago Bulls 82
Scoring by quarter: 19-16, 37-24, 27-14, 22-28
Pts: Chris Mañon 16; Rebs: Adou Thiero 7 Asts: Jon Elmore 5	Pts: Caleb Wilson 21; Rebs: Caleb Wilson 8 Asts: Jaylin Sellers 3

Thomas & Mack Center, Las Vegas, Nevada
Referees: Marcy Williams, Jacob Lear, Reihen Knysh

ESPN2

July 16
4:00 PM PDT

Boxscore

Golden State Warriors 87, New York Knicks 77
Scoring by quarter: 26-19, 10-17, 29-21, 22-20
Pts: LJ Cryer 17; Rebs: Graham Ike 9 Asts: Yaxel Lendeborg 6	Pts: Jaden Akins 21; Rebs: Liam Robbins 9 Asts: Jack Kayil 4

Cox Pavilion, Las Vegas, Nevada
Referees: Agon Abazi, Ajay Gonnelli, Alicia Shivers

Prime

July 16
5:00 PM PDT

Boxscore

Memphis Grizzlies 96, Atlanta Hawks 64
Scoring by quarter: 32-2, 19-20, 25-20, 20-22
Pts: Cameron Boozer 24; Rebs: Cameron Boozer 7 Asts: Javon Small 7	Pts: Isaiah Wong 20; Rebs: Isaiah Wong 5 Asts: Gabe Madsen 5

Thomas & Mack Center, Las Vegas, Nevada
Referees: Ian McClenny, Josh Reed, Brett Perry

ESPN2

July 16
6:00 PM PDT

Boxscore

Toronto Raptors 99, Miami Heat 90
Scoring by quarter: 19-23, 38-24, 17-23, 25-20
Pts: Allen Graves 23; Rebs: Nate Bittle 7 Asts: Seth Lundy 6	Pts: Jahmir Young 30; Rebs: Jahmir Young 12; Asts: Tre Donaldson 8

Cox Pavilion, Las Vegas, Nevada
Referees: Julian McFadden, Shem Rivera, Gerald Ayayi

Prime

July 16
7:00 PM PDT

Boxscore

Portland Trail Blazers 108, Denver Nuggets 101
Scoring by quarter: 25-25, 23-25, 29-24, 31-27
Pts: Frankie Fidler 16; Rebs: Frankie Fidler 5 Asts: Chris Youngblood 8	Pts: Mark Sears 26; Rebs: Bryce Hopkins 8 Asts: Mark Sears 4

Thomas & Mack Center, Las Vegas, Nevada
Referees: Hortencia Sanchez-Carrizales, Italo Araujo, Kenneth Arrick II

==== Day 9 ====
Prime

July 17
3:30 PM PDT

Sacramento Kings 92, Charlotte Hornets 90
Scoring by quarter: 31–19, 24–31, 17–21, 20–19
Pts: Emanuel Sharp 16; Rebs: Viktor Lakhin 11; Asts: Jonathan Mogbo 4	Pts: Hannes Steinbach 22; Rebs: Hannes Steinbach 11; Asts: Christian Anderson Jr. 8

Cox Pavilion, Las Vegas, Nevada
Referees: Jafar Kinsey, Erica Parker, Tommy Wu

ESPN

July 17
4:00 PM PDT

Chicago Bulls 91, Cleveland Cavaliers 100
Scoring by quarter: 21–15, 16–30, 28–26, 26–29
Pts: Donovan Atwell 22; Rebs: Akawa, Williams 8 each Asts: Houston Mallette 6	Pts: Meleek Thomas 24; Rebs: Agee, Spillers 9 each Asts: Malaki Branham 5

Thomas & Mack Center Las Vegas, Nevada
Referees: Lars Murray, Erik Aellig, Lance Gordon

Prime

July 17
5:30 PM PDT

Dallas Mavericks 110, New York Knicks 88
Scoring by quarter: 16–23, 25–18, 35–19, 34–28
Pts: Green Jr., Smith 21 each Rebs: Jorge Diaz Graham 12; Asts: Vsevolod Ishchenko 7	Pts: Pacôme Dadiet 19; Rebs: Nick Jourdain 8 Asts: Akins, Kayil, Nickel 3 each

Cox Pavilion, Las Vegas, Nevada
Referees: JP Primm, Kaz Beverley, Ashley Olson

ESPN

July 17
6:00 PM PDT

Detroit Pistons 87, Miami Heat 101
Scoring by quarter: 24–22, 28–19, 20–25, 15–35
Pts: Ebuka Okorie 29; Rebs: Isaac Jones 6 Asts: Chaz Lanier 4	Pts: Tre White 21; Rebs: Tre Donaldson 8 Asts: Tre Donaldson 10

Thomas & Mack Center Las Vegas, Nevada
Referees: Quincy Smith, Carlos Peralta-Ortega, Javed Trotman

Prime

July 17
7:30 PM PDT

Portland Trail Blazers 79, Utah Jazz 83
Scoring by quarter: 20–19, 10–21, 21–19, 28–24
Pts: Jalen Bridges 16; Rebs: Yang Hansen 10; Asts: Martin, Olivari 5 each	Pts: Justin Harmon 21; Rebs: Handlogten, Robinson 9 each Asts: Hayden Gray 6

Cox Pavilion, Las Vegas, Nevada
Referees: Bobby Bissant, Kenny Gardner, Jacob Budnik

ESPN

July 17
8:00 PM PDT

Minnesota Timberwolves 120, Los Angeles Clippers 128 (OT)
Scoring by quarter: 19–20, 23–38, 33–34, 40–23, Overtime: 5–13
Pts: Jaylin Williams 21; Rebs: Rocco Zikarsky 7 Asts: Zyon Pullin 8	Pts: Keaton Wagler 26; Rebs: Norchad Omier 15; Asts: Sean Pedulla 11

Thomas & Mack Center Las Vegas, Nevada
Referees: Matt Rafferty, Ashley Birch, Evan Singletary

==== Day 10 ====
Prime

July 18
1:30 PM PDT

Boston Celtics 97, Orlando Magic 103
Scoring by quarter: 24–24, 24–21, 23–26, 26–22
Pts: Caleb Grill 18; Rebs: Nick Pringle 5 Asts: Pringle, Williams 4 each	Pts: Malik Reneau 19; Rebs: Baker, Toney 6 each Asts: Ace Baldwin Jr. 5

Thomas & Mack Center Las Vegas, Nevada
Referees: Ian McClenny, RJ Johnson, Emily Murphy

ESPN

July 18
2:00 PM PDT

Philadelphia 76ers 94, Milwaukee Bucks 96
Scoring by quarter: 22–28, 29–22, 23–19, 20–27
Pts: Gerald Ayayi 22; Rebs: Drew Cisse 7 Asts: Lyles, Maddox Jr., Wilson 4 each	Pts: Brayden Burries 27; Rebs: Bogoljub Marković 8 Asts: Brayden Burries 5

Cox Pavilion Las Vegas, Nevada
Referees: Julian McFadden, Josh Reed, Kenneth Arrick II

Prime

July 18
3:30 PM PDT

Houston Rockets 90, Memphis Grizzlies 101
Scoring by quarter: 9–24, 24–24, 24–25, 33–28
Pts: Quadir Copeland 24; Rebs: Crawford, Thornton 8 each Asts: Bruce Thornton 7	Pts: Cedric Coward 28; Rebs: Cameron Boozer 12; Asts: Javon Small 6

Thomas & Mack Center Las Vegas, Nevada
Referees: Agon Abazi, Julian Scott, Cameron Garber

ESPN

July 18
4:00 PM PDT

Atlanta Hawks 83, Washington Wizards 91
Scoring by quarter: 15–24, 21–19, 22–23, 25–25
Pts: Devon Higgs 22; Rebs: Isaiah Wong 9 Asts: Johnson, Madsen 4 each	Pts: John Camden 22; Rebs: Felix Okpara 8 Asts: Reece Beekman 14

Cox Pavilion Las Vegas, Nevada
Referees: Hortencia Sanchez-Carrizales, Cameron Gelinas, Fatri Abazi

Prime

July 18
5:30 PM PDT

Golden State Warriors 92, Los Angeles Lakers 88
Scoring by quarter: 21–19, 21–23, 21–24, 29–22
Pts: Cryer, Ike 16 each Rebs: Graham Ike 11; Asts: Boyd, Cryer 4 each	Pts: Adou Thiero 18; Rebs: Adou Thiero 10; Asts: Chris Mañon 4

Thomas & Mack Center Las Vegas, Nevada
Referees: Marcy Williams, Klajdi Mulla, Italo Araujo

ESPN

July 18
6:00 PM PDT

Indiana Pacers 91, New Orleans Pelicans 73
Scoring by quarter: 23–16, 18–23, 29–12, 21–22
Pts: Jalen Slawson 22; Rebs: Keba Keita 7 Asts: Yuki Kawamura 12	Pts: Dominique Daniels Jr. 25; Rebs: Solomon Washington 11; Asts: Markquis Nowell 6

Cox Pavilion Las Vegas, Nevada
Referees: Ryo Hasebe, Bill McClatchy, Tre White

Prime

July 18
7:30 PM PDT

San Antonio Spurs 86, Phoenix Suns 81
Scoring by quarter: 23–16, 16–27, 22–10, 25–28
Pts: Miles Kelly 20; Rebs: Igor Miličić Jr. 11; Asts: Davis, Melendez 4 each	Pts: Devin Askew 20; Rebs: Corey Camper Jr. 8 Asts: Camper Jr., Cooke 4 each

Thomas & Mack Center Las Vegas, Nevada
Referees: Austin Spiker, Paulina Gajdosz, Brett Perry

==== Day 11 ====
ESPN

July 19
1:30 PM PDT

Brooklyn Nets 108, Oklahoma City Thunder 90
Scoring by quarter: 37–24, 23–21, 22–19, 26–26
Pts: John Ukomadu 23; Rebs: Dion Brown 10; Asts: Dion Brown 11	Pts: Steven Ashworth 22; Rebs: Bryce Harris 10; Asts: Lamar Wilkerson 5

Thomas & Mack Center Las Vegas, Nevada
Referees: Ken Jones, Ashley Birch, Dein Dainja

ESPN

July 19
3:30 PM PDT

Denver Nuggets 96, Toronto Raptors 89
Scoring by quarter: 23–29, 24–18, 30–20, 19–22
Pts: Jahmi'us Ramsey 20; Rebs: Jahmi'us Ramsey 8 Asts: Mark Sears 6	Pts: Nimari Burnett 15; Rebs: Jamarion Sharp 10; Asts: AJ Hoggard 9

Thomas & Mack Center Las Vegas, Nevada
Referees: Kastine Evans, Erica Parker, Carlos Peralta-Ortega

ESPN

July 19
6:00 PM PDT

Golden State Warriors 94, Memphis Grizzlies 90
Scoring by quarter: 23–24, 24–23, 19–29, 28–14
Pts: Lendeborg, Smith 21 each Rebs: Yaxel Lendeborg 10; Asts: LJ Cryer 6	Pts: Boozer, Coward 19 each Rebs: Cameron Boozer 8 Asts: Javon Small 8

Thomas & Mack Center Las Vegas, Nevada
Referees: Brent Haskill, Nate Cearley, CP Painter
