= Summer league =

Summer league may refer to several sports leagues.

== Baseball ==
- Dominican Summer League
- Venezuelan Summer League
- Collegiate summer baseball

== Basketball ==
- NBA Summer League
- Summer Pro League

== See also ==
- Category:Collegiate summer baseball leagues
- Category:Summer association football leagues
