= Gabe Madsen =

American basketball player (born 2001)

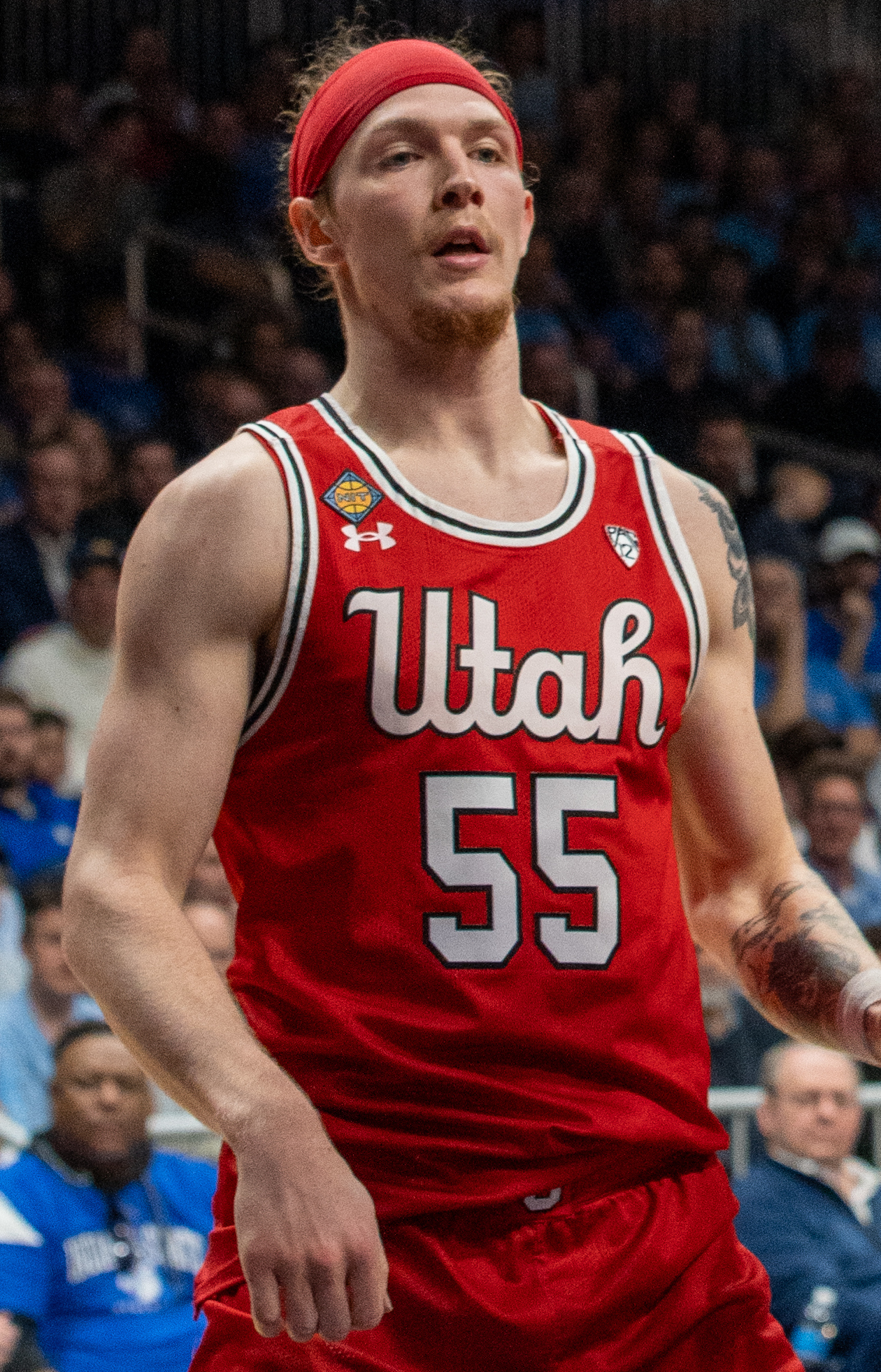
- Madsen in 2024

No. 88 – Sioux Falls Skyforce
- Position: Shooting guard / small forward
- League: NBA G League

Personal information
- Born: May 1, 2001 (age 25) Eau Claire, Wisconsin, U.S.
- Listed height: 6 ft 6 in (1.98 m)
- Listed weight: 200 lb (91 kg)

Career information
- High school: Mayo (Rochester, Minnesota)
- College: Cincinnati (2020–2021); Utah (2021–2025)
- NBA draft: 2025: undrafted
- Playing career: 2025–present

Career history
- 2025–present: Sioux Falls Skyforce
- Stats at NBA.com
- Stats at Basketball Reference

Gabriel Madsen (born May 1, 2001) is an American professional basketball player for the Sioux Falls Skyforce of the NBA G League. He previously played college basketball for the Cincinnati Bearcats and the Utah Utes. He established the Utah Utes single-season (105) and career (315) record for made three-point shots.

== Early life and high school ==
Madsen attended Mayo High School located in Rochester, Minnesota. Coming out of high school, he was rated as a three star recruit, where he committed to play college basketball for the Cincinnati Bearcats alongside his twin-brother Mason Madsen, over other offers from schools such as Marquette, Minnesota, Northwestern, and Iowa. After the COVID-19 stay-at-home ban was lifted, he and his brother had practices with Will Tschetter.

== College career ==
=== Cincinnati ===
During his first collegiate season in 2020-21, Madsen played in just two games for the Bearcats before opting out due to the COVID-19 pandemic. After the conclusion of the season, he decided to enter his name into the NCAA transfer portal.

=== Utah ===
Madsen transferred to play for the Utah Utes. During his first season with Utah in 2021-22, he played in 25 games with ten starts, averaging 6.7 points, 1.0 rebound, and 0.7 assists per game. In the 2022-23 season, Madsen started in 23 games, where he averaged 11.6 points, 2.7 rebounds, and 1.7 assists per game. During the 2023-24 season, he appeared in all 37 games for the Utes, averaging 13.6 points, 3.9 rebounds and 2.5 assists while breaking the Utah single-season record with 105 made 3-pointers. The total led the Pac-12 Conference for the 2023–24 season. On December 31, 2024, Madsen scored just three points in a blowout loss to Baylor. On February 5, 2025, he recorded 17 points in a victory versus Colorado. On February 15, 2025, he notched 24 points, three rebounds, two steals, an assist, while also setting the school career record for made three's in an upset win over Kansas. During the 2024-25 season, he started in 33 games, averaging 15.2 points, 2.6 rebounds, and 2.5 assists per game on 37.1% shooting from the field and 32.2% from three-point range. For his performance during the 2024-25 season, Madsen earned an All-Big 12 Honorable Mention nod. After the conclusion of the 2024-25 season, he declared for the 2025 NBA draft.

== Professional career ==
Madsen signed a free agent NBA Summer League contract with the Golden State Warriors. Madsen appeared in 2 of 3 California Classic Summer League games. After logging 8 points in 9 minutes in his July 11, 2025 NBA Summer League debut, Madsen went 6–7 against the Utah Jazz in the first half on July 13 for a game high 18 points at the half in 8 minutes of action off the bench. He finished with a game-high 22 points. Madsen shot 51.9 (14–27) on three-point shots in summer league play.

On July 26, 2025, Madsen signed a Exhibit 10 contract with the Miami Heat, giving the Heat his G-League rights if he is waived. The contract is a fully non-guaranteed one-year, minimum salary agreement that confers the team the right to sign him to a two-way contract before the regular season. It also accords Madsen a bonus as high as $85,300 if he stays with the team's G League affiliate for 60 days after being waived. He was waived on September 25. Madsen was on the Sioux Falls Skyforce opening night roster that was announced November 6.

On June 30, 2026, it was announced that Madsen would be on the roster for the Atlanta Hawks during the 2026 NBA Summer League. He was invited as a returning player to the 2026 Skyforce training camp.

== Personal life ==
Madsen is the twin-brother of former Utah teammate Mason Madsen. Madsen became engaged to his long-time girlfriend Autumn Busse on July 22, 2025 according to their social media accounts. He is not related to american football player Maddux Madsen.
