= Caleb Wilson (disambiguation) =

Caleb Wilson (born 2006) is an American basketball player.

Caleb Wilson may also refer to:

- Caleb Wilson (American football) (born 1996), American football coach and former player
- Caleb Wilson (Neighbours), fictional character from Australian soap opera Neighbours
