= Mason Madsen =

American basketball player (born 2001)

No. 45 – Czarni Słupsk
- Position: Shooting guard
- League: PLK

Personal information
- Born: May 1, 2001 (age 25) Eau Claire, Wisconsin, U.S.
- Listed height: 6 ft 4 in (1.93 m)
- Listed weight: 200 lb (91 kg)

Career information
- High school: Mayo (Rochester, Minnesota)
- College: Cincinnati (2020–2022); Boston College (2022–2024); Utah (2024–2025)
- NBA draft: 2025: undrafted
- Playing career: 2025–present

Career history
- 2025: Valley Suns
- 2026: Södertälje BBK
- 2026: Urunday Universitario
- 2026–present: Czarni Słupsk

Mason Madsen (born May 1, 2001) is an American professional basketball player for Czarni Słupsk of the Polish Basketball League (PLK). He played college basketball for the Cincinnati Bearcats, Boston College Eagles, and Utah Utes. He is the twin-brother to Gabe Madsen.

== High school career ==
Madsen attended Mayo High School in Rochester, Minnesota. He was considered a two star recruit by 247Sports. He verbally committed to the Cincinnati Bearcats on August 31, 2019. As a senior, Madsen averaged 19.7 points, 5.5 rebounds, and 5.0 assists per game.

== College career ==
=== Cincinnati ===
Madsen played in 15 games off the bench. He averaged 6.5 points, 3.0 rebounds, and 1.1 assists in 19.6 minutes played per game. After the season on March 18th, 2021, Madsen entered the NCAA Transfer Portal. On April 22, 2021, he chose to return to Cincinnati for his sophomore year.

As a sophomore, Madsen played in 30 games and averaged 3.9 points, 1.3 rebounds, 0.7 assists, at 11.6 minutes per game. After the season, Madsen entered the Transfer Portal.

=== Boston College ===
On April 13, 2022, Madsen committed to Boston College. In his junior season Madsen played in 33 games averaging 21.2 minutes per contest. He averaged 5.8 points, 2.6 rebounds, and 0.8 assists per game.

As a senior he played in 36 games. He scored a career-high 25 points making seven three-pointers against Miami on February 17, 2024. Madsen averaged a career-high 8.1 points, 3.5 rebounds, and 1.4 assists per game. On April 9, 2024, Madsen entered the Transfer Portal.

=== Utah ===
On April 14, 2024, Madsen committed to Utah, where he would play his last year of college basketball with his twin brother, Gabe. As a graduate student, he played in 30 games for the Utes. He averaged 6.8 points, 2.3 rebounds, and 1.2 assists.

== Professional career ==
After going undrafted in the 2025 NBA draft, Madsen attended a local try out for the Valley Suns of the NBA G League. Madsen then appeared in six games for the Valley Suns where he averaged 3.8 points, 1.5 rebounds, and 0.5 assists in 12.2 minutes per game. He was waived on December 12, 2025.

On January 24th, 2026, Madsen signed with Södertälje BBK of the Swedish Basketball League (SBL). He averaged 16.6 points, 4.3 rebounds, and 1.7 assists in 12 games.

After the season, Madsen signed to play with Urunday Universitario for the post season as an injury replacement player.

On June 6, 2026, Madsen signed with Energa Czarni Słupsk of the Polish Basketball League (PLK).
