= Holy Innocents' Episcopal School =

School in Sandy Springs, Georgia, US

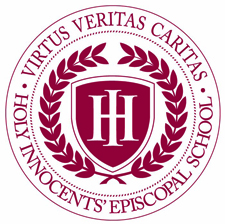

Location
- 805 Mount Vernon Highway; Sandy Springs, Georgia 30327; United States; 33.9079°N 84.4150°W

Information
- Other name: HIES
- Type: Private, college-preparatory day school
- Religious affiliation: Episcopal
- Established: 1959
- Oversight: Episcopal Diocese of Atlanta
- NCES School ID: 00297725
- Head of school: Paul A. Barton
- Teaching staff: 207.0 (on an FTE basis)
- Grades: PK–12
- Gender: Co-educational
- Enrollment: 1,373 (2015–2016)
- Student to teacher ratio: 6.4
- Colors: Crimson and gold
- Athletics conference: GHSA Class AA Region 6
- Mascot: Bear
- Nickname: Golden Bears
- Publication: Torchbearer; C&G
- Yearbook: Ursidae
- Affiliations: NAES, NAIS, Round Square
- Website: www.hies.org

Holy Innocents' Episcopal School (HIES) is a PK3–12 private, Episcopal, co-educational college-preparatory day school in Sandy Springs, Georgia, United States. It is located in the Episcopal Diocese of Atlanta. It is the largest co-ed Episcopal school in the United States and serves approximately 1,400 students each year.

== Notable alumni ==
- Brian Baumgartner, actor
- Skye Bolt, MLB player
- Patrick Ewing Jr., NBA player
- Owen Vaccaro, actor
- Caleb Wilson, NBA player for the Chicago Bulls
