= Nick Pringle =

English cricketer (born 1966)

Personal information
- Full name: Nicholas John Pringle
- Born: 20 September 1966 (age 60); Weymouth, Dorset, England
- Batting: Right-handed
- Bowling: Right-arm medium-fast

Domestic team information
- Years: Team
- 1986–1991: Somerset
- First-class debut: 3 September 1986 Somerset v Worcestershire
- Last First-class: 10 August 1991 Somerset v Sri Lankans
- List A debut: 26 July 1987 Somerset v Worcestershire
- Last List A: 21 July 1991 Somerset v Essex

Career statistics
Competition	First-class	List A
Matches	27	12
Runs scored	707	97
Batting average	16.83	10.77
100s/50s	0/3	0/0
Top score	79	22
Balls bowled	852	30
Wickets	5	0
Bowling average	110.20	–
5 wickets in innings	0	0
10 wickets in match	0	n/a
Best bowling	2/35	0/10
Catches/stumpings	15/–	4/–
- Source: CricketArchive, 6 June 2010

Nicholas John Pringle (born 20 September 1966) is a former English cricketer who played for Somerset County Cricket Club between 1986 and 1991. A right-handed batsman and right-arm medium-fast bowler, he played 27 first-class matches and 12 List A matches during his career. He also made appearances in the Second Eleven Championship for Durham, Gloucestershire and Leicestershire.

== Cricket career ==
Pringle made his first-class debut for Somerset late in the 1986 season against Worcestershire, bowling 10 overs in the first-innings without a wicket. Batting as part of the lower order, he scored 10 and 11 as Somerset lost by an innings after being forced to follow on. By the time of his next appearance in the County Championship midway through the following season, Pringle was considered more of a batsman, being moved up to number five. Playing back-to-back matches, Pringle enjoyed his best batting display in the next match, against Warwickshire. He scored a career-high 79, and shared a fourth-wicket partnership of 193 with Martin Crowe. His final match for Somerset in August 1991 against the touring Sri Lankans.
