= Caleb Wilson =

American basketball player (born 2006)

No. 8 – Chicago Bulls
- Position: Power forward
- League: NBA

Personal information
- Born: July 18, 2006 (age 20) Atlanta, Georgia, U.S.
- Listed height: 6 ft 10 in (2.08 m)
- Listed weight: 215 lb (98 kg)

Career information
- High school: Holy Innocents' Episcopal School (Sandy Springs, Georgia)
- College: North Carolina (2025–2026)
- NBA draft: 2026: 1st round, 4th overall pick
- Drafted by: Chicago Bulls
- Playing career: 2026–present

Career history
- 2026–present: Chicago Bulls

Career highlights
- Consensus second-team All-American (2026); First-team All-ACC (2026); ACC All-Rookie team (2026); McDonald's All-American (2025); Jordan Brand Classic (2025); Mr. Georgia Basketball (2025)
- Stats at NBA.com
- Stats at Basketball Reference

Caleb Noah Sheldon Wilson (born July 18, 2006) is an American professional basketball player for the Chicago Bulls of the National Basketball Association (NBA). Wilson played college basketball for the North Carolina Tar Heels and became a consensus five-star recruit and one of the top players in the 2025 class. Wilson was selected by the Bulls with the fourth-overall pick in the 2026 NBA draft.

== Early life and high school career ==
Wilson was born in Atlanta to Jerry Wilson and Sabrina Wilson, and has a younger sister Jaxon. He attended Holy Innocents' Episcopal School. Wilson averaged 14.5 points, 12.6 rebounds, 5.2 blocks, 3.9 assists, and 1.2 steals per game during his sophomore year. He averaged 21 points, 15 rebounds, and over 4 blocks per game as a junior. Wilson tallied 21.6 points, 11.1 rebounds, five assists, 3.6 blocks, and 2.1 steals per contest to lead HIES to its first state championship. He was selected to play in the 2025 McDonald's All-American Boys Game during his senior year.

=== Recruiting ===
Wilson was a consensus five-star recruit and one of the top players in the 2025 class, according to major recruiting services. He committed to play college basketball at North Carolina over offers from Kentucky and Ohio State.

College recruiting
Name	Hometown	School	Height	Weight	Commit date
Caleb Wilson; PF	Atlanta, GA	Holy Innocents' Episcopal School (GA)	6 ft 9 in (2.06 m)	205 lb (93 kg)	Jan 24, 2025
Caleb Wilson; PF	Recruit ratings: Rivals: 247Sports: On3: ESPN: (96)				
Overall recruit ranking: Rivals: 5 247Sports: 8 On3: 5 ESPN: 5
Note: In many cases, Scout, Rivals, 247Sports, On3, and ESPN may conflict in their listings of height and weight.; In these cases, the average was taken. ESPN grades are on a 100-point scale.; Sources: "North Carolina 2025 Basketball Commitments". Rivals.; "2025 North Carolina Tar Heels Recruiting Class". ESPN.; "2025 Team Ranking". Rivals.

== College career ==
Wilson enrolled at the University of North Carolina at Chapel Hill in June 2025 in order to take part in the Tar Heels' summer practices.

Wilson made headlines as a fan favorite in his second appearance for the Tar Heels after leading UNC to a victory over Kansas with a game-high 24 points.

On February 9, when number 14 North Carolina, defeated number 4 Duke 71–68 in their Carolina–Duke rivalry game, Wilson posted a team-high 23 points just below the game-high 24 points of Cameron Boozer. Wilson suffered a fractured left hand on February 10, 2026, during the Tar Heels' loss to Miami at the Watsco Center, ruling him out for the rest of the season. At the time of his injury, Wilson was leading North Carolina in scoring, rebounding, steals, and blocks per game. On March 6, it was announced that Wilson would require season-ending surgery to repair a broken thumb suffered while dunking a ball during practice.

== Professional career ==
On June 23, 2026, Wilson was selected with the fourth overall pick by the Chicago Bulls in the 2026 NBA draft. In his NBA Summer League debut, he scored 35 points, which is an NBA summer league debut-game record point total by a professional rookie, with 7 made 3 pointers. The record was achieved against Cameron Boozer of the Memphis Grizzlies, as their Carolina–Duke rivalry made its way to the NBA of these former AAU teammates (who went 3rd and 4th in the 2026 NBA draft). Notably, in his second summer league game he posterized Jonas Aidoo, leaving the 2nd overall pick Darryn Peterson in shock.

On October 21, Wilson made his NBA regular-season debut, recording 16 points, four rebounds, and three steals in a 135–92 loss to the Toronto Raptors. Wilson also set a new record for worst Plus/Minus (+/-) on a rookie debut, recording it at -45 on October 21st. On October 24, Wilson put up 30 points and 14 rebounds in a 124–120 loss to the Washington Wizards.

=== 2026 right hand injury ===
On November 11, 2026, Caleb Wilson suffered a right hand injury during the Chicago Bulls' 124–119 loss to the San Antonio Spurs. Wilson sustained the injury in the third quarter when his right hand struck the ball while attempting to knock it out of Victor Wembanyama's hands. He left the game and was ruled out for the remainder of the contest. Wilson finished the game with 15 points and five rebounds in 15 minutes.

On November 12, it was reported that Wilson had suffered a fracture in his right hand and would undergo surgery. He was expected to miss approximately four to six weeks as a result of the injury.

== Personal life ==
When Wilson is not practicing basketball, he enjoys running, listening to music, reading Stoicism such as The Daily Stoic and building Lego sets.

== Career statistics ==
Legend
GP	Games played	GS	Games started	MPG	Minutes per game
FG%	Field goal percentage	3P%	3-point field goal percentage	FT%	Free throw percentage
RPG	Rebounds per game	APG	Assists per game	SPG	Steals per game
BPG	Blocks per game	PPG	Points per game	**Bold**	Career high

=== College ===
Year	Team	GP	GS	MPG	FG%	3P%	FT%	RPG	APG	SPG	BPG	PPG
2025–26	North Carolina	24	24	31.3	.578	.259	.713	9.4	2.7	1.5	1.4	19.8
