= Anthony Pritchard =

Anthony Langley Pritchard, also known as Tony Pritchard (31 July 1940 – 30 June 2012) was a teacher and university administrator. He was the foundation chief executive officer of Open Learning Australia (now Open Universities Australia).

== Biography ==
Pritchard was born in Melbourne, Australia on 31 July 1940 and moved with his family to country Victoria from where he was sent to Melbourne Grammar School. He completed science and education degrees at the universities of Melbourne and Queensland and taught science and mathematics in government and independent secondary schools in Victoria and Tasmania.

From 1969 to 1975, he taught in a Papua New Guinea government high school (Kwikila High School) before taking up a lectureship at the Goroka Teachers' College (now the University of Goroka). From Goroka, he was invited to join the staff of the Institute of Technology in Lae, where from a senior administrative position, he assisted the director and later vice-chancellor (Professor John Sandover) develop the institution for university status as Papua New Guinea's University of Technology.

In 1975 he was appointed as the executive officer of the Interim Council of Victoria's fourth university, Deakin University, arriving some months ahead of the foundation vice-chancellor, Professor Fred Jevons. During the next ten years, Pritchard became university secretary and registrar as the university grew and became a leader in open and distance education.

In 1985 he was appointed as registrar of Monash University, responsible for the university's academic and personnel administration, the university's international program and the Open Learning Program. His actions in promoting a relationship with Malaysia's Sunway College in 1988 led to the establishment of Monash's first international campus in 1998, Monash University Sunway.

As part of the vice-chancellor's executive (Professor Mal Logan), he played a central role in the mergers undertaken by Monash with the Chisholm Institute of Technology and the Gippsland College of Advanced Education (GIAE). The relationship with GIAE was crucial in Monash becoming one of the eight national centres for distance learning, and subsequently obtaining major Australian government grants to develop internationally recognised programs in open and distance learning. Pritchard was successively director of the Television Open Learning Project and later, Open Learning Australia, first established as a company of Monash University and later, as a company with seven other university shareholders.

In 1992 and in 1993, Pritchard was seconded to Open Learning Australia (OLA), becoming first managing director and later chief executive officer. A formal review of Open Learning Australia was conducted by the Centre for the Studies of Higher Education, The University of Melbourne, amongst whose comments included the following: OLA "should continue" and much credit was due to all concerned, who "despite difficulties inherent in the early stages of any major initiative, have shown an overriding commitment to the goal of widened access to quality tertiary education and the development of effective ways in which to achieve it".

Open Learning Australia was established to implement the Australian Government's Open Learning Initiative with grants of $35 million. As an organisationally and technologically innovative alternative to campus based university studies, it makes tertiary education available to those unable to benefit from more conventional forms, building upon established distance education practices. Now, as Open Universities Australia, its main delivery method is through Internet-based studies and online learning.

In 1999 Pritchard resigned from OLA to head his own education consulting company. From 2000 to 2008 he was a consultant in higher education for clients in Australia and overseas, directing projects concerned with program innovation and its efficient and effective implementation. Numerous consultancies involved the building of collaborative links between Australian and overseas universities to produce joint programs of study, in arts and sciences, business and hospitality with significant new international ‘double degrees’ being created as a result.

Since early 2008 the design of theme-based tours and participation as a guest lecturer on international tours became his main activity.

He published his personal memoir in 2008 titled Peering over the Balcony - A Life in Education.

Anthony Pritchard died on 30 June 2012 leaving two sons, a daughter and two grandchildren.
