= Jaylin Sellers =

American basketball player (born 2003)

No. 22 – Chicago Bulls
- Position: Shooting guard
- League: NBA

Personal information
- Born: June 3, 2003 (age 23) Columbus, Georgia, U.S.
- Listed height: 6 ft 4 in (1.93 m)
- Listed weight: 205 lb (93 kg)

Career information
- High school: Spencer (Columbus, Georgia)
- College: Ball State (2021–2023); UCF (2023–2025); Providence (2025–2026)
- NBA draft: 2026: undrafted
- Playing career: 2026–present

Career history
- 2026–present: Chicago Bulls
- 2026–present: →Windy City Bulls

Career highlights
- Second-team All-Big East (2026); Third-team All-MAC (2023); MAC All-Freshman team (2022)
- Stats at NBA.com
- Stats at Basketball Reference

Jaylin Sellers (born June 3, 2003) is an American professional basketball player for the Chicago Bulls of the National Basketball Association (NBA), on a two-way contract with the Windy City Bulls of the NBA G League. He played college basketball for the Ball State Cardinals, UCF Knights, and Providence Friars.

== Early life ==
Sellers was born on June 3, 2003, and grew up in Columbus, Georgia. He attended William Henry Spencer High School in Columbus where he played basketball, earning team MVP honors in his sophomore season and All-Tri City Player of the Year honors as a junior. He also played for Team Carrol Premier and Georgia Kings with the AAU circuit. Sellers committed to play college basketball for the Ball State Cardinals.

== College career ==
Sellers served as Ball State's sixth man during the 2021–22 season as a freshman. He was named to the Mid-American Conference (MAC) All-Freshman team while averaging 6.7 points and 1.8 rebounds in 2021–22, then averaged 13.5 points and 3.7 rebounds in the 2022–23 season. Sellers was named third-team All-MAC as a sophomore, then transferred to the UCF Knights in 2023. He was named honorable mention All-Big 12 Conference in his first season with the Knights and averaged 15.9 points. Sellers missed all but three games for the Knights in 2024–25, before transferring to the Providence Friars for his final season in 2025–26. He started 33 games for the Friars and had his best college season, averaging 18.3 points, 4.2 rebounds and 1.6 assists per game while earning second-team All-Big East Conference honors.

== Professional career ==
After going unselected in the 2026 NBA draft, Sellers signed a two-way contract with the Chicago Bulls on July 3, 2026.
