= NBA Summer League =

Basketball league

- Current season, competition or edition: 2026 NBA Summer League
- Sport: Basketball
- First season: Orlando: 2002 (defunct in 2018); Las Vegas: 2004; Utah: 2015; Sacramento/San Francisco: 2018
- No. of teams: Utah: 4 Sacramento/San Francisco: 4 Las Vegas: 30
- Country: United States
- Most recent champions: Las Vegas: Golden State Warriors (1)
- Most titles: Las Vegas: Golden State Warriors; Sacramento Kings; Portland Trail Blazers (2)
- Broadcasters: NBA TV and ESPN
- Streaming partner: ESPN+

The NBA Summer League is a series of off-season basketball competitions in which National Basketball Association (NBA) teams come together to try out different summer rosters instead of their regular season lineups, including rookie, sophomore and G League affiliate players. The primary competition that most teams participate in, the Las Vegas NBA Summer League, has been held on the campus of the University of Nevada, Las Vegas since 2004. In addition, the California Classic has been hosted by the Golden State Warriors or the Sacramento Kings since 2018, and the Utah Jazz have hosted the Salt Lake City Summer League (previously known as the Utah Jazz Summer League from 2015 to 2019) since 2015. Formerly, the Orlando Magic hosted the Orlando Pro Summer League from 2002 to 2017. All those leagues are sometimes generally referred to as just the NBA Summer League when also mentioned with its host location.

== History ==
Summer leagues have existed for decades. Historically, there was not an organized structure, with leagues sometimes overlapping and not officially coordinated. The Orlando Pro Summer League was held from 2002 to 2017, operating each year excluding 2005 and 2011. In 2004, the league held the Las Vegas Summer League for the first time; it is by far the largest league, with 32 teams participating as of 2019. The Utah Jazz Summer League began play in 2015, replacing the Rocky Mountain Revue, an event held from 1984 to 2008 before going on a lengthy hiatus due to declining participation.

The leagues generally consist of a handful of games per team. Unlike regulation NBA games, which are 48 minutes long, games only last 40 minutes (same as in FIBA/WNBA), plus multiple 2-minute overtime periods (first overtime is played in its entirety; true sudden death thereafter). Before the 2013 leagues, no official champions were named at any league, with the leagues focusing more on individual auditions and development. A champion is currently named for the Las Vegas league, although team performance is generally not emphasized.

Unsigned free agents are often signed to summer league deals, providing a chance to possibly be signed to a contract during the regular season. Any team can sign the free agent after the league is over, not just the one he played for in summer league. For example, Jeremy Lin, a Harvard graduate, was invited to play for the Dallas Mavericks summer league team despite being undrafted earlier in the year. In the 2010 summer league, Lin performed well and was later signed by the Golden State Warriors.

=== Orlando Pro Summer League ===
The Orlando Pro Summer League was held from 2002 to 2017, operating each year except in 2005 and 2011. Hosted by the Orlando Magic, its games were closed to the public and was only broadcast on television. The league named a champion for the first time in 2013 when the Oklahoma City Thunder defeated the Houston Rockets 85–77. On July 11, 2014, the Philadelphia 76ers won the championship with a 91–75 victory over the Memphis Grizzlies. The Dallas Mavericks were the final champions of the league, winning in 2017. The league ended after 2017 due to the trend of NBA teams participating in the Las Vegas league.

=== Las Vegas Summer League ===
The Las Vegas Summer League played its inaugural season in 2004 at University of Nevada, Las Vegas (UNLV)'s arena, the Thomas & Mack Center with six NBA teams – Boston Celtics, Cleveland Cavaliers, Denver Nuggets, Orlando Magic, Phoenix Suns, and Washington Wizards – playing a total of 13 games. With Warren LeGarie leading the way, the summer league had three successful summers in which participation increased to 16 teams playing more than 40 games at UNLV. In 2007, the NBA attached its name to the event, making it the "NBA" summer league. In 2008, the summer league expanded to 22 teams and was sponsored by EA Sports. In the 2015 season, Samsung became the sponsor. In 2022 it became the NBA 2K Summer League. Since 2018, all NBA teams play in the Las Vegas Summer League in the typical tournament style.

=== Salt Lake City Summer League ===
From 1984 until 2008, the Utah Jazz hosted a tournament known as the Rocky Mountain Revue. Launched as a community outreach campaign to encourage interest in the Jazz in the summer of 1984 under the direction of Jazz public relations staffers David Allred and Kim Turner, initially the league operated as a three-week, pro-am league in July with alumni players from Utah, BYU, Weber State and Utah State.

In 1990, after sending a team to the California Summer League the previous summer, Scott Layden, then the Jazz's director of basketball operations, invited the Portland Trail Blazers, Phoenix Suns, and Sacramento Kings to join the league and moved to an all-NBA format. Over the course of the next 20 years, as few as four teams (1990) and as many as 16 teams (1998), participated, including the first International entry, Burghy Roma. The league did not play games during the 1999 strike-shortened season. In 2008, the NBA Development League had a D-League Ambassadors team. The Rocky Mountain Revue also showcased the Iranian national team.

Games were hosted at Westminster College (Salt Lake City), East High School (Salt Lake City), Delta Center and the Revue's final home, Salt Lake Community College. The Revue was known for its popularity, evidenced by sold-out crowds each time the Jazz played. The Revue was one of the first NBA summer leagues to feature NBA officials, as the NBA used the league for referee development and training. The only NBA teams that did not send a team to the Revue at least once were the Los Angeles Lakers, Detroit Pistons and Washington Wizards.

Due to declining participation, the event was cancelled for the 2009 season. However, the Jazz confirmed in November 2014 that they would revive the Utah Jazz Summer League for 2015, albeit with a smaller number of teams participating. The event included the Boston Celtics, Philadelphia 76ers, and San Antonio Spurs as well as the Jazz in a six-game, four-day event at EnergySolutions Arena.

In 2019, the Utah Jazz Summer League announced some changes in the event, replacing its name as Salt Lake City Summer League. The rebranding also included a new logo, as well as a new court design based on the team's popular City Edition court.

=== California Classic Summer League ===
On May 6, 2018, reports surfaced that to replace the position previously held in Orlando by the Magic, the Kings would host its own Summer League event in Sacramento. The event is scheduled to take place before the Las Vegas Summer League begins, with the teams in place for the event involving the San Antonio Spurs, Los Angeles Lakers, Golden State Warriors, and Miami Heat. Eight days later, the Kings confirmed that their own Summer League event (titled the California Classic Summer League) would take place from July 2–5, 2018 (taking a day off to celebrate the Fourth of July), replacing the Orlando Pro Summer League. On May 14, 2018, the Sacramento Kings confirmed that report.

For the 2019 event, the Kings announced the team's roster for their second annual California Classic Summer League that took place on July 1–3 at Golden 1 Center. It featured a four-team format that included a double-header match-up per day featuring the Kings, Golden State Warriors, Los Angeles Lakers and Miami Heat.

For the 2024 event, the Sacramento Kings and Golden State Warriors announced that they will be partnering to host an expanded dual California Classic Summer League event in both Sacramento and San Francisco. The sixth annual California Classic Summer League will feature three days of game play at Golden 1 Center presented by Ticketmaster on July 6, 7 and 9 with the Sacramento Kings, San Antonio Spurs and Charlotte Hornets and Chase Center on July 6, 7 and 10 with the Golden State Warriors, Sacramento Kings, Los Angeles Lakers, and Miami Heat.

For the 2025 event, the Golden State Warriors announced that they will host the seventh annual California Classic Summer League at the Chase Center on July 5, 6 and 8, featuring three days of game play between the Warriors, Los Angeles Lakers, Miami Heat and San Antonio Spurs. It marks the third time California Classic games will be played at Chase Center, which will host the entirety of the event this year.

== Las Vegas MVP winners ==
The award winner's team represented who they played for at the time they won Summer League MVP.

Year	Nat.	Player	Pos.	Team
2006	(United States)	Randy Foye	SG	Minnesota Timberwolves
2007	(United States)	Nate Robinson	PG	New York Knicks
2008	(United States)	Jerryd Bayless (Top Rookie)	PG	Portland Trail Blazers
2009	(United States)	Blake Griffin	PF	Los Angeles Clippers
2010	(United States)	John Wall	PG	Washington Wizards
2012	(United States)	Damian Lillard (co-MVPs)	PG	Portland Trail Blazers
2012	(United States)	Josh Selby (co-MVPs)	PG	Memphis Grizzlies
2013	(Lithuania)	Jonas Valančiūnas	C	Toronto Raptors
2014	(United States)	Glen Rice Jr.	SG	Washington Wizards
2015	(United States)	Kyle Anderson	SF	San Antonio Spurs
2016	(United States)	Tyus Jones	PG	Minnesota Timberwolves
2017	(United States)	Lonzo Ball	PG	Los Angeles Lakers
2018	(United States)	Josh Hart	SG	Los Angeles Lakers
2019	(Canada)	Brandon Clarke	PF	Memphis Grizzlies
2021	(United States)	Davion Mitchell (co-MVPs)	PG	Sacramento Kings
2021	(United States)	Cameron Thomas (co-MVPs)	SG	Brooklyn Nets
2022	(United States)	Keegan Murray	PF	Sacramento Kings
2023	(United States)	Cam Whitmore	SF	Houston Rockets
2024	(United States)	Jalen Wilson	SF	Brooklyn Nets
2025	(United States)	Kyle Filipowski	C	Utah Jazz
2026	(United States)	Yaxel Lendeborg	SF	Golden State Warriors

== Las Vegas All Summer League Teams ==
The award winner's team represented who they played for at the time they were named to the All Summer League team.

Year	First Team		Second Team	
Year	Player	Team	Player	Team
2014	Otto Porter Jr.	Washington Wizards	Jordan McRae	Philadelphia 76ers
2014	Donatas Motiejunas	Houston Rockets	Russ Smith	New Orleans Pelicans
2014	Glen Rice Jr.	Washington Wizards	T.J. Warren	Phoenix Suns
2014	Tony Snell	Chicago Bulls	Tim Hardaway Jr.	New York Knicks
2014	Doug McDermott	Chicago Bulls	Rudy Gobert	Utah Jazz
2015	Seth Curry	New Orleans Pelicans	Emmanuel Mudiay	Denver Nuggets
2015	Norman Powell	Toronto Raptors	Alan Williams	Houston Rockets
2015	Doug McDermott	Chicago Bulls	Dwight Powell	Dallas Mavericks
2015	Kyle Anderson	San Antonio Spurs	Larry Drew	New Orleans Pelicans
2015	T.J. Warren	Phoenix Suns	Noah Vonleh	Portland Trail Blazers
2016	Ben Simmons	Philadelphia 76ers	Thon Maker	Milwaukee Bucks
2016	Jordan McRae	Cleveland Cavaliers	Norman Powell	Toronto Raptors
2016	Alan Williams	Phoenix Suns	Jaylen Brown	Boston Celtics
2016	Tyus Jones	Minnesota Timberwolves	Tyler Ulis	Phoenix Suns
2016	Bobby Portis	Chicago Bulls	Kelly Oubre, Jr.	Washington Wizards
2017	Dennis Smith	Dallas Mavericks	Cheick Diallo	New Orleans Pelicans
2017	John Collins	Atlanta Hawks	Wayne Selden	Memphis Grizzlies
2017	Caleb Swanigan	Portland Trail Blazers	Bryn Forbes	San Antonio Spurs
2017	Lonzo Ball	Los Angeles Lakers	Kyle Kuzma	Los Angeles Lakers
2017	Josh Jackson	Phoenix Suns	Jayson Tatum	Boston Celtics
2018	Christian Wood	Milwaukee Bucks	Trae Young	Atlanta Hawks
2018	Kevin Knox II	New York Knicks	Jaren Jackson, Jr.	Memphis Grizzlies
2018	Josh Hart	Los Angeles Lakers	Deandre Ayton	Phoenix Suns
2018	Collin Sexton	Cleveland Cavaliers	Svi Mykhailiuk	Los Angeles Lakers
2018	Wendell Carter, Jr.	Chicago Bulls	Wade Baldwin IV	Portland Trail Blazers
2019	Kendrick Nunn	Miami Heat	Anfernee Simons	Portland Trail Blazers
2019	Jarrett Allen	Brooklyn Nets	Rui Hachimura	Washington Wizards
2019	Mitchell Robinson	New York Knicks	Lonnie Walker IV	San Antonio Spurs
2019	Brandon Clarke	Memphis Grizzlies	Jaxson Hayes	New Orleans Pelicans
2019	Nickeil Alexander-Walker	New Orleans Pelicans	Chris Boucher	Toronto Raptors
2020	Cancelled due to COVID-19 pandemic			
2021	Davion Mitchell	Sacramento Kings	Cade Cunningham	Detroit Pistons
2021	Cam Thomas	Brooklyn Nets	Jalen Green	Houston Rockets
2021	Jalen Johnson	Atlanta Hawks	Paul Reed	Philadelphia 76ers
2021	Trey Murphy III	New Orleans Pelicans	Patrick Williams	Chicago Bulls
2021	Payton Pritchard	Boston Celtics	Luka Garza	Detroit Pistons
2021	Jalen Smith	Phoenix Suns		
2021	Obi Toppin	New York Knicks		
2022	Keegan Murray	Sacramento Kings	Santi Aldama	Memphis Grizzlies
2022	Tari Eason	Houston Rockets	Bennedict Mathurin	Indiana Pacers
2022	Quentin Grimes	New York Knicks	Marko Simonović	Chicago Bulls
2022	Sandro Mamukelashvili	Milwaukee Bucks	Trendon Watford	Portland Trail Blazers
2022	Cam Thomas	Brooklyn Nets	Lindell Wigginton	Milwaukee Bucks
2023	Keyonte George	Utah Jazz	Max Christie	Los Angeles Lakers
2023	Sam Merrill	Cleveland Cavaliers	Javon Freeman-Liberty	Chicago Bulls
2023	Orlando Robinson	Miami Heat	Xavier Moon	Los Angeles Clippers
2023	Hunter Tyson	Denver Nuggets	Emoni Bates	Cleveland Cavaliers
2023	Cam Whitmore	Houston Rockets	Jabari Smith Jr.	Houston Rockets
2023			Jalen Wilson	Brooklyn Nets
2024	GG Jackson II	Memphis Grizzlies	Bub Carrington	Washington Wizards
2024	Jordan Miller	Los Angeles Clippers	Donovan Clingan	Portland Trail Blazers
2024	Scotty Pippen Jr.	Memphis Grizzlies	Jaime Jaquez Jr.	Miami Heat
2024	Reed Sheppard	Houston Rockets	Jarace Walker	Indiana Pacers
2024	Kel’el Ware	Miami Heat	Jalen Wilson	Brooklyn Nets
2025	Nique Clifford	Sacramento Kings	Ron Holland II	Detroit Pistons
2025	Kyle Filipowski	Utah Jazz	Isaac Jones	Sacramento Kings
2025	David Jones-Garcia	San Antonio Spurs	Kon Knueppel	Charlotte Hornets
2025	Jordan Miller	Los Angeles Clippers	Ajay Mitchell	Oklahoma City Thunder
2025	Terrence Shannon Jr.	Minnesota Timberwolves	KJ Simpson	Charlotte Hornets
2026	Cameron Boozer	Memphis Grizzlies	Cedric Coward	Memphis Grizzlies
2026	Brayden Burries	Milwaukee Bucks	Egor Dёmin	Brooklyn Nets
2026	Yaxel Lendeborg	Golden State Warriors	Khaman Maluach	Phoenix Suns
2026	Meleek Thomas	Cleveland Cavaliers	Liam McNeeley	Charlotte Hornets
2026	Caleb Wilson	Chicago Bulls	Zyon Pullin	Minnesota Timberwolves

== Champions ==
Year	League	Champion	Score	Runner-up	Championship MVP
2013	Las Vegas	Golden State Warriors	91–77	Phoenix Suns	Ian Clark
2014	Las Vegas	Sacramento Kings	77–68	Houston Rockets	Ray McCallum Jr.
2015	Las Vegas	San Antonio Spurs	93–90	Phoenix Suns	Jonathon Simmons
2016	Las Vegas	Chicago Bulls	84–82 (OT)	Minnesota Timberwolves	Jerian Grant
2017	Las Vegas	Los Angeles Lakers	110–98	Portland Trail Blazers	Kyle Kuzma
2018	Las Vegas	Portland Trail Blazers	91–73	Los Angeles Lakers	K. J. McDaniels
2019	Las Vegas	Memphis Grizzlies	95–92	Minnesota Timberwolves	Brandon Clarke
2020	Cancelled due to COVID-19 pandemic				
2021	Las Vegas	Sacramento Kings (2)	100–67	Boston Celtics	Louis King
2022	Las Vegas	Portland Trail Blazers (2)	85–77	New York Knicks	Trendon Watford
2023	Las Vegas	Cleveland Cavaliers	99–78	Houston Rockets	Isaiah Mobley
2024	Las Vegas	Miami Heat	120–118 (OT)	Memphis Grizzlies	Josh Christopher
2025	Las Vegas	Charlotte Hornets	83–78	Sacramento Kings	Kon Knueppel
2026	Las Vegas	Golden State Warriors (2)	94–90	Memphis Grizzlies	Yaxel Lendeborg

== See also ==
- Reebok Pro Summer League, former summer basketball league in Boston, Massachusetts
- Summer Pro League, former summer basketball league in Long Beach, California
