= Summer Pro League =

Professional basketball league in California

- Sport: basketball
- Founded: 1969
- Folded: 2007
- Replaced by: NBA Summer League
- Country: United States
- Venue: Walter Pyramid
- Broadcasters: Prime Sports (1987–89); SportsChannel (1994); ESPN 2 (1995); ESPN (2001–02)

The Summer Pro League (SPL), formerly known as the Southern California Summer Pro League, was a basketball league held every summer in Long Beach, California. The SPL moved to the Walter Pyramid on the campus of Long Beach State in 1995. Before then, it was held at various sites in the Los Angeles Metropolitan Area, including UCLA, Loyola Marymount University, and Pepperdine University. The league was founded in 1969.

While not run by the National Basketball Association (NBA), the league previously hosted NBA teams with their first and second round draft picks, undrafted players, and free agents. Due to the NBA lockout in 1998, no NBA teams were entered into the league that year. Due to the rising popularity of the Las Vegas Summer League, 2006 was the last year the NBA sent teams to the SPL. 2007 was the SPL's final year in operation, during which the league played with amateur teams.

== Notable events and participants ==
The 1976 Summer Pro League was played on the campus of California State University, Los Angeles and featured four National Basketball Association (NBA) teams—the Los Angeles Lakers, Phoenix Suns, Chicago Bulls and the Atlanta Hawks.

In 1979, the Summer Pro League championship game was held on August 12 between the Adidas sponsored team and Athletes in Action, led by Marvin Delph. The match was won by the Athletes in Action, 116–103.

The Summer Pro League Most Valuable Player in 1980 was awarded to Bernard King, who played for the Golden State Warriors.

Nancy Lieberman played for the 1981 Los Angeles Lakers SPL team. She was under contract with the Dallas Diamonds of the Women's Professional Basketball League at the time. When reporters compared her to Ann Meyers, who had an unsuccessful tryout with the Indiana Pacers two years prior, Lieberman rejected the comparison telling the Associated Press, "I'm not trying to showcase myself [...] I'm not saying that I can play in the NBA."

The Philadelphia 76ers signed Marc Iavaroni due to his performance during the 1982 Summer Pro League. He went on to start 77 games for the 1983 NBA Champion team.

In 1983, Bill Walton fielded a team known as "Walton's All-Stars" that was coached by Walt Hazzard and featured Kiki Vandeweghe and Greg Lee. Lee was signed by the Portland Trail Blazers in 1975 at the urging of Walton, due to his performance in that year's Summer Pro League.

The 1984 United States men's Olympic basketball team played in that year's Summer Pro League to train for the 1984 Summer Olympics in Los Angeles. The Summer Pro League was held in San Diego, California at Peterson Gym on the campus of San Diego State University in 1984.

A.C. Green of the Los Angeles Lakers led the Summer Pro League in 1986 with 29 points per game and 14 rebounds per game.

The Southern Pro League was televised from 1987 to 1989 on Prime Sports Network. In 1994, it was broadcast on SportsChannel and the following year was on ESPN 2. In 2001 and 2002, the Summer Pro League was broadcast on ESPN.

Kobe Bryant played for the Los Angeles Lakers team during the 1996 Summer Pro League. He scored 27 points in 26 minutes in a 123–113 loss to the Detroit Pistons prompting Pistons coach Alvin Gentry to say, "I don't want to compare anyone to Michael Jordan. But I'll call [Bryant] Jordanesque. I have never a better player his age at his position." Bryant went on to average 25 points in the Summer Pro League. Bryant and teammate Derek Fisher mentioned the game while reminiscing on their career together during post-game interviews following the Lakers 2010 NBA Finals victory. Bryant returned to the league in 1997.

The 1998 Summer Pro League was not well attended due to the ongoing NBA lockout. As a result, it was not a sanctioned NBA event and players feared reprisals if they competed.

In 1999, the Summer Pro League's All-Star Team was named on the last day of the season. Selected for the NBA division team was Kebu Stewart from the Los Angeles Clippers, Paul Pierce from the Boston Celtics, Bonzi Wells from the Portland Trail Blazers, Robert Traylor from the Milwaukee Bucks and Andre Miller for the Cleveland Cavaliers. Open conference all-stars were: Stanislav Medvedenko of the Ukraine men's national basketball team, Cedric Ceballos of the NBA Pros free agent team, James Cotton also of the NBA Pros, Tracy Murray of AM 1540 and Sean Cornell of Fila Select.

Football player Randy Moss fielded a team during the 2000 Summer Pro League. Under National Football League rules, Moss needed written permission from his team, the Minnesota Vikings, to participate in the SPL. He paid the $395 league entry fee and signed a waiver that stated if he was injured while playing basketball, the Vikings would not be responsible for the remainder of his contract. Moss played three games and averaged 12.7 points and six rebounds per game.

Magic Johnson fielded a team during the 2001 Summer Pro League that played one game against a team called the "Young Guns", which featured football players Terrell Owens and Tony Gonzalez. That year, the Wheeling Bulldogs, owned by Tom Ficara, dropped out of the league due to a broadcast dispute with the NBA. According to the NBA's agreement with the Summer Pro League, the NBA had final broadcast rights and refused to permit Ficara the right to air Bulldogs games over radio and television.

In 2003, the Summer Pro League released a "SPL Dream Team", which featured prominent basketball players who played in the SPL. The first team was made up of Magic Johnson, Tim Duncan, Moses Malone, Karl Malone and Kobe Bryant. The second team consisted of Isiah Thomas, Reggie Miller, David Robinson, Dominique Wilkins and Tracy McGrady. Staff for the dream team was Pat Riley as head coach, Jerry West as general manager and Mark Cuban as owner. Honorable mentions were Dirk Nowitzki, Antawn Jamison, Jerry Stackhouse, Ray Allen and Paul Pierce.

During the 2003 SPL season, nine National Basketball Association team participated. They were the Los Angeles Lakers, Los Angeles Clippers, Golden State Warriors, Seattle SuperSonics, Memphis Grizzlies, Houston Rockets, New Orleans Hornets, Denver Nuggets and Toronto Raptors. In 2004, the Rockets, Hornets, Nuggets, Raptors and SuperSonics were replaced by the Dallas Mavericks, New York Knicks, Sacramento Kings and San Antonio Spurs.

== See also ==
- NBA Summer League
- Reebok Pro Summer League
