= Jonas Aidoo =

American basketball player (born 2002)

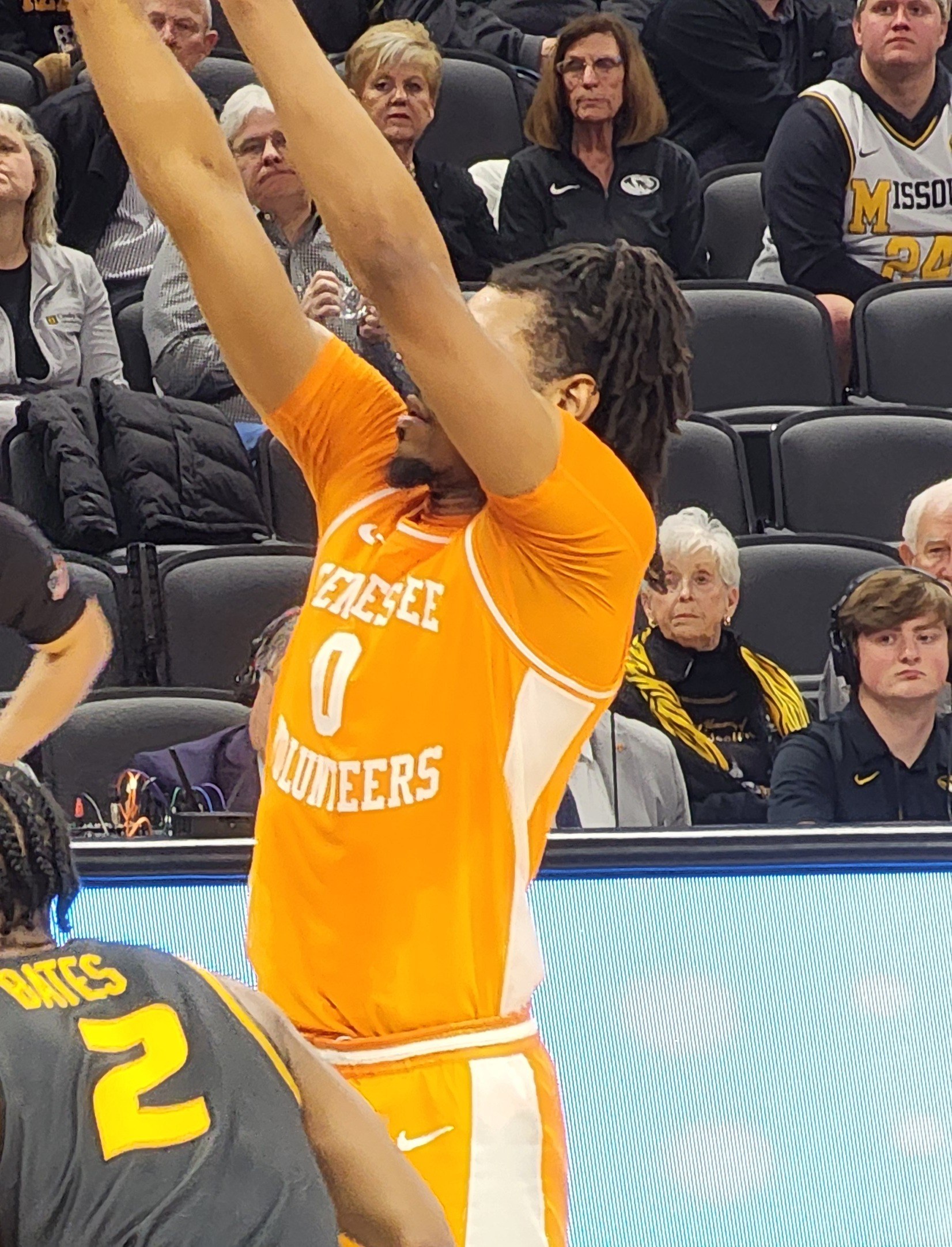
- Aidoo shooting a free-throw for Tennessee

No. 25 – Utah Jazz
- Position: Center
- League: NBA

Personal information
- Born: December 10, 2002 (age 23) Durham, North Carolina, U.S.
- Listed height: 6 ft 11 in (2.11 m)
- Listed weight: 240 lb (109 kg)

Career information
- High school: Durham Voyager Academy (Durham, North Carolina)
- College: Tennessee (2021–2024); Arkansas (2024–2025)
- NBA draft: 2025: undrafted
- Playing career: 2025–present

Career history
- 2025–2026: Greensboro Swarm
- 2026–present: Utah Jazz
- 2026–present: →Salt Lake City Stars

Career highlights
- NBA G League champion (2026); Second-team All-SEC (2024)
- Stats at NBA.com
- Stats at Basketball Reference

Jonas Parker Aidoo (born December 10, 2002) is an American professional basketball player for the Utah Jazz of the National Basketball Association (NBA), on a two-way contract with the Salt Lake City Stars of the NBA G League. He played college basketball for the Tennessee Volunteers and the Arkansas Razorbacks.

== Early life and high school ==
Aidoo attended Durham Voyager Academy, where he averaged eleven points, six rebounds, and three blocks as a senior. Coming out of high school, Aidoo was rated as a four-star recruit, the 7th overall center, and the top player in the state of North Carolina in the 2021 class. Aidoo received offers from school such as Alabama, Georgia, Ole Miss, Clemson, Kansas, Tennessee, Marquette, West Virginia, and Witchia State. Aidoo ultimately committed to play college basketball for the Marquette Golden Eagles. However, Aidoo decommitted from Marquette after they hired new head coach Shaka Smart. Aidoo later committed to play for the Tennessee Volunteers.

== College career ==
As a freshman, Aidoo had a breakout game notching five points, seven rebounds and three blocks in a win over #3 Kentucky. In his freshman season in 2021–22 he averaged 2.1 points, 2.2 rebounds, and 0.5 blocks in 19 games. In 2022–23, Aidoo played in 35 games while making nine starts, where he averaged 5.1 points, 4.9 rebounds, 0.9 assists, and 1.3 blocks per game. During the 2023–24 season versus Arkansas, he had a career game scoring 23 points while grabbing 12 rebounds in a victory. During the 2023–24 season, Aidoo was named second-team All-SEC and was named to the SEC all-defensive team. In the first round of the 2023–24 NCAA tournament, he tallied 15 points, six rebounds and three blocks as he helped the Volunteers advance beating Saint Peter's in the first round. Aidoo averaged 11.4 points, 7.3 rebounds and 1.8 blocks per game on 51.5% shooting.

Following the 2023–24 season, Aidoo entered the NCAA transfer portal, ultimately landing with the Arkansas Razorbacks. He averaged 6.9 points and 5.0 rebounds per game.

== Professional career ==
On October 15, 2025, Aidoo signed an Exhibit 10 contract with the Charlotte Hornets after going undrafted. On October 17, 2025, he was waived by the team. Aidoo signed with the Greensboro Swarm of the NBA G League on December 27.

== Career statistics ==
Legend
| GP | Games played | GS | Games started | MPG | Minutes per game |
| FG% | Field goal percentage | 3P% | 3-point field goal percentage | FT% | Free throw percentage |
| RPG | Rebounds per game | APG | Assists per game | SPG | Steals per game |
| BPG | Blocks per game | PPG | Points per game | **Bold** | Career high |

=== College ===
| Year | Team | GP | GS | MPG | FG% | 3P% | FT% | RPG | APG | SPG | BPG | PPG |
|---|---|---|---|---|---|---|---|---|---|---|---|---|
| 2021–22 | Tennessee | 19 | 0 | 7.8 | .325 | - | **.824** | 2.2 | .2 | .2 | .5 | 2.1 |
| 2022–23 | Tennessee | 35 | 9 | 18.3 | .507 | **.278** | .750 | 4.9 | .9 | .5 | 1.3 | 5.1 |
| 2023–24 | Tennessee | **36** | **36** | **24.8** | .515 | .200 | .626 | **7.3** | **1.0** | **.7** | **1.8** | **11.4** |
| 2024–25 | Arkansas | 33 | 15 | 18.9 | **.570** | .000 | .618 | 5.0 | .8 | **.7** | 1.1 | 6.9 |
| Career | | 123 | 60 | 18.7 | .515 | .200 | .655 | 5.2 | .8 | .6 | 1.3 | 7.0 |
