= Zyon Pullin =

American basketball player (born 2001)

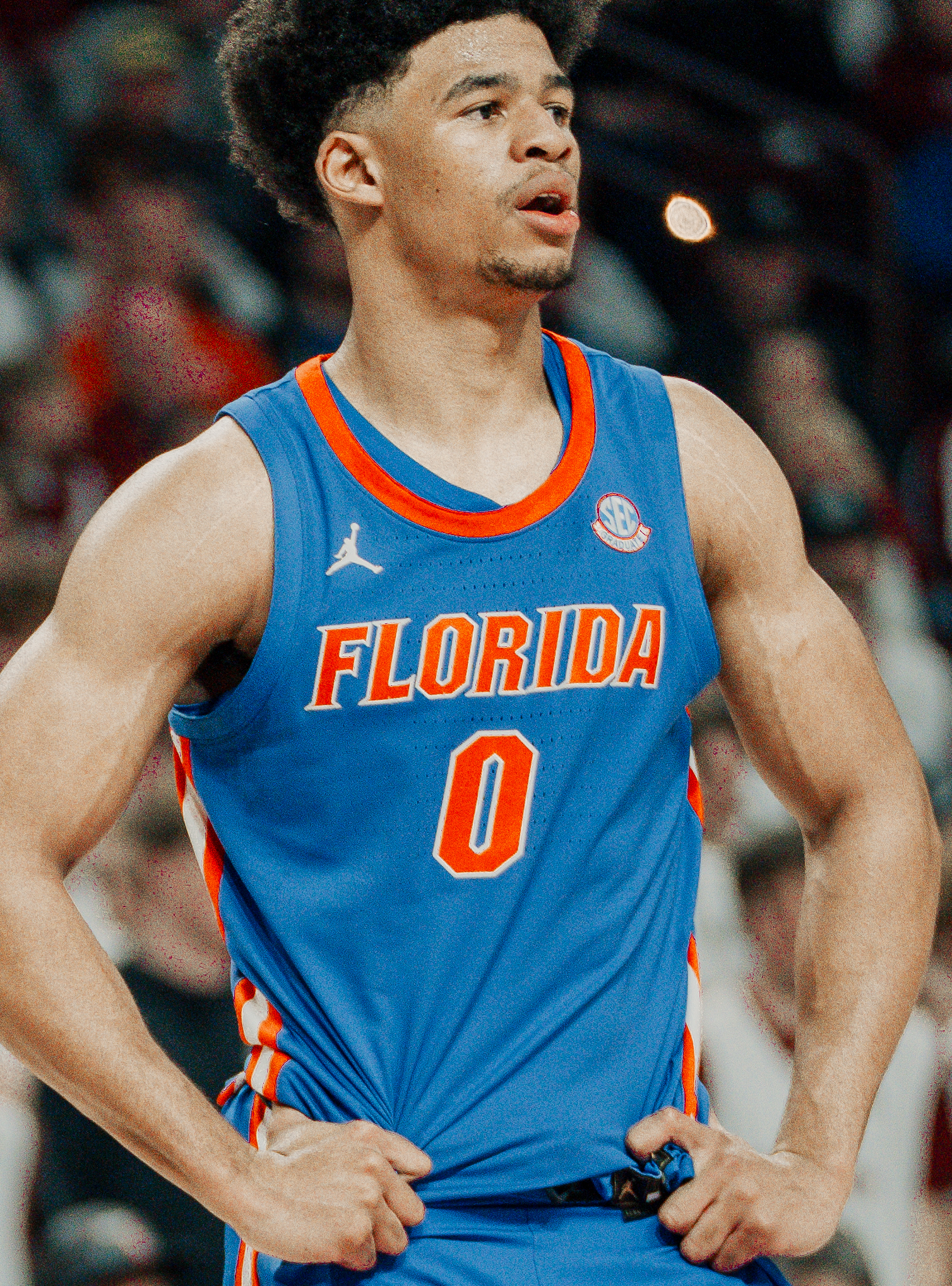
- Pullin with Florida in 2024

No. 15 – Minnesota Timberwolves
- Position: Point guard
- League: NBA

Personal information
- Born: March 3, 2001 (age 25) Pleasant Hill, California, U.S.
- Listed height: 6 ft 4 in (1.93 m)
- Listed weight: 206 lb (93 kg)

Career information
- High school: College Park (Pleasant Hill, California)
- College: UC Riverside (2019–2023); Florida (2023–2024)
- NBA draft: 2024: undrafted
- Playing career: 2024–present

Career history
- 2024–2025: Sioux Falls Skyforce
- 2025: Memphis Grizzlies
- 2025: →Memphis Hustle
- 2025–2026: →Iowa Wolves
- 2026–present: Minnesota Timberwolves
- 2026–present: →Iowa Wolves

Career highlights
- First-team All-SEC (2024); First-team All-Big West (2023); Second-team All-Big West (2022)
- Stats at NBA.com
- Stats at Basketball Reference

Zyon Pullin (born March 3, 2001) is an American professional basketball player for the Minnesota Timberwolves of the National Basketball Association, on a two-way contract with the Iowa Wolves of the NBA G League. He played college basketball for the UC Riverside Highlanders and Florida Gators.

== Early life and high school career ==
Pullin grew up in Pleasant Hill, California and attended College Park High School.

== College career ==
Pullin began his college career at UC Riverside. He averaged 14.3 points, 5.6 rebounds, and 4.3 assists per game and was named second-team All-Big West during his junior season. Pullin was named first-team All-Big West as a senior after averaging 18.3 points, 4.4 rebounds and 4.2 assists per game as the Highlanders had their winningest season ever. After the season, Pullin decided to utilize the extra year of eligibility granted to college athletes who played in the 2020 season due to COVID-19 pandemic and entered the NCAA transfer portal.

Pullin transferred to Florida. He was suspended for the first three games of the season by the NCAA for his participation in the 2023 Portsmouth Invitational Tournament, a non-sanctioned offseason tournament for recently graduated players pursuing a professional career. Pullin was named first-team All-Southeastern Conference in his only season with the Gators after averaging 15.5 points and 4.9 assists per game.

== Professional career ==
After going undrafted in the 2024 NBA draft, Pullin signed a two-way contract with the Miami Heat on July 1, 2024. However, he was waived on July 25 and signed an Exhibit 10 contract on August 5, being later waived on October 19. On October 28, he joined the Sioux Falls Skyforce.

On January 10, 2025, Pullin signed a two-way contract with the Memphis Grizzlies. Pullin played three games for the Grizzlies, scoring no points. In eleven G League games for the Memphis Hustle, Pullin averaged 18.8 points per game. Pullin was waived by the Grizzlies on November 20, following the signing of PJ Hall.

On November 6, 2025, Pullin was named to the Iowa Wolves' opening night roster. On March 2, 2026, Pullin signed a two-way contract with the Minnesota Timberwolves.

== Career statistics ==
Legend
GP	Games played	GS	Games started	MPG	Minutes per game
FG%	Field goal percentage	3P%	3-point field goal percentage	FT%	Free throw percentage
RPG	Rebounds per game	APG	Assists per game	SPG	Steals per game
BPG	Blocks per game	PPG	Points per game	**Bold**	Career high

=== NBA ===
Year	Team	GP	GS	MPG	FG%	3P%	FT%	RPG	APG	SPG	BPG	PPG
2024–25	Memphis	3	0	1.0	.000	—	—	.0	.0	.0	.0	.0
2025–26	Minnesota	**5**	0	**8.6**	**.692**	**.333**	**1.000**	**.6**	**1.8**	**.2**	.0	**4.6**
Career		8	0	5.8	.643	.333	1.000	.4	1.1	.1	.0	2.9

=== College ===
Year	Team	GP	GS	MPG	FG%	3P%	FT%	RPG	APG	SPG	BPG	PPG
2019–20	UC Riverside	31	0	17.6	.355	.286	.659	2.1	1.8	.3	**.1**	4.1
2020–21	UC Riverside	22	22	31.4	.479	.396	.800	4.9	4.5	.7	.0	12.1
2021–22	UC Riverside	27	26	**34.7**	.473	.311	.767	**5.6**	4.3	.8	.0	14.3
2022–23	UC Riverside	29	**29**	33.9	**.486**	.394	.771	4.4	4.2	**.9**	**.1**	**18.3**
2023–24	Florida	**33**	27	33.5	.444	**.449**	**.847**	3.9	**4.9**	**.9**	**.1**	15.5
Career		142	104	30.0	.460	.378	.790	4.1	3.9	.7	.1	12.8
