= 2029 FIBA Asia Cup qualification =

International qualification tournament

Tournament details
- Dates: 26 August 2026 – February 2029
- Teams: 34 (from 2 confederations)

The 2029 FIBA Asia Cup qualification is a basketball competition that is being played from August 2026 to February 2029, to determine the FIBA Asia-Oceania nations who will qualify for the 2029 FIBA Asia Cup.

== Format ==
The qualification process started in August 2026, with pre-qualifiers being contested on sub-zone and regional basis. Eight teams will advance to the qualifiers, joining the sixteen teams from the 2027 FIBA World Cup Asian Qualifiers.

== Entrants ==
Teams entering the qualifiers (from the 2025 FIBA Asia Cup)
West Region	East Region
Iran; Lebanon; Jordan; Saudi Arabia; Syria; India; Qatar; Iraq	Australia; Japan; New Zealand; China; Philippines; South Korea; Chinese Taipei; Guam

Teams entering the pre-qualifiers (any team that did not participate in the 2025 FIBA Asia Cup)
West Region				East Region		
West Asia (WABA sub-zone)	Gulf (GBA sub-zone)	Central Asia (CABA sub-zone)	South Asia (SABA sub-zone)	East Asia (EABA sub-zone)	Southeast Asia (SEABA sub-zone)	Oceania (FIBA Oceania)
Palestine	Bahrain; United Arab Emirates; Kuwait; Oman	Kazakhstan; Kyrgyzstan	Sri Lanka; Maldives; Nepal	Hong Kong; Mongolia	Indonesia; Thailand; Malaysia; Singapore; Vietnam	Fiji

== Pre-qualifiers ==
=== Participating teams ===
Teams entering the qualifiers (from the 2025 FIBA Asia Cup)
West Region	East Region
Bahrain; Kazakhstan; Kuwait; Kyrgyzstan; Maldives; Nepal; Oman; Palestine; Sri Lanka; United Arab Emirates	Fiji; Hong Kong; Indonesia; Malaysia; Mongolia; Singapore; Thailand; Vietnam

=== First round ===
Teams played a round-robin tournament to determine the three best ranked teams that advanced to the second round.

Teams from the WABA, GBA, CABA, and SABA sub-zones played in Group A and B, forming the West region, while teams from Oceania and the SEABA and EABA sub-zones played in Groups C and D, forming the East region. The groups were played at a single venue.

All times are local.

==== Group A ====
The tournament was held in Dubai, United Arab Emirates.

Pos	Team	Pld	W	L	PF	PA	PD	Pts	Qualification
1	Bahrain	4	4	0	389	280	+109	8	Second round
2	United Arab Emirates (H)	4	3	1	380	308	+72	7	Second round
3	Kuwait	4	2	2	315	298	+17	6	Second round
4	Oman	4	1	3	290	371	−81	5	
5	Nepal	4	0	4	262	379	−117	4	

Source: FIBA
Rules for classification: 1) Points; 2) Head-to-head results; 3) Points difference; 4) Points scored.
(H) Hosts

26 August 2026	United Arab Emirates	110–64	Nepal	Dubai
17:00	Scoring by quarter: 27−14, 30−15, 31−14, 22−21
	Pts: Al-Ameri 23; Rebs: Al-Breiki 10; Asts: Dickerson 7	Boxscore	Pts: N. Maharjan 24; Rebs: A. Shrestha 8 Asts: Shah 5	Arena: Sheikh Saeed Bin Maktoum Sports Hall; Attendance: 100; Referees: Ahmad Al-Yousef (JOR), Ho Chang-jen (TPE), Yana Nikogossyan (KAZ)

26 August 2026	Oman	63–88	Kuwait	Dubai
20:00	Scoring by quarter: 12–26, 16–14, 13–21, 22–27
	Pts: Al-Riyami 22; Rebs: Al-Zahaibi 7 Asts: Al-Shaaibi 3	Boxscore	Pts: Al-Hamidi, Al-Shemmari 16; Rebs: Bin Jawhar 11; Asts: Al-Shemmari, Hasan 5	Arena: Sheikh Saeed Bin Maktoum Sports Hall; Attendance: 70; Referees: Mohammed Al-Tarawneh (JOR), Rakesh Ramalingaiah (IND), Haryanto Sutaryo (INA)

27 August 2026	Bahrain	106–62	Oman	Dubai
17:00	Scoring by quarter: 24−13, 32−18, 24−15, 26−16
	Pts: M. Rashed 21; Rebs: Sampson 9 Asts: Al-Derazi 9	Boxscore	Pts: Bakhit 21; Rebs: Bakhit 9 Asts: Al-Busaidi 6	Arena: Sheikh Saeed Bin Maktoum Sports Hall; Attendance: 101; Referees: Mohammed Al-Tarawneh (JOR), Haryanto Sutaryo (INA), Hum Zhung Liang (MAS)

27 August 2026	Kuwait	72–75	United Arab Emirates	Dubai
20:00	Scoring by quarter: 20−17, 16−26, 17−15, 19−17
	Pts: Hasan 19; Rebs: Hasan 16; Asts: Al-Shemmari, Hasan 4	Boxscore	Pts: Dickerson 27; Rebs: Al-Zaabi 8 Asts: Dickerson 7	Arena: Sheikh Saeed Bin Maktoum Sports Hall; Attendance: 350; Referees: Ahmad Al-Yousef (JOR), Rakesh Ramalingaiah (IND), Ho Chang-jen (TPE)

28 August 2026	Nepal	65–88	Kuwait	Dubai
17:00	Scoring by quarter: 12−21, 11−24, 15−22, 27−21
	Pts: Shah 14; Rebs: B. Maharjan 9 Asts: B. Maharjan 5	Boxscore	Pts: Al-Shemmari 16; Rebs: Aljuma'h 14; Asts: Akbar 6	Arena: Sheikh Saeed Bin Maktoum Sports Hall; Attendance: 65; Referees: Rakesh Ramalingaiah (IND), Yana Nikogossyan (KAZ), Haryanto Sutaryo (INA)

28 August 2026	United Arab Emirates	80–83	Bahrain	Dubai
20:00	Scoring by quarter: 16–26, 22–5, 19–22, 23–30
	Pts: Dickerson 27; Rebs: Al-Shabebi 10; Asts: Dickerson 4	Boxscore	Pts: M. Rashed 28; Rebs: Sampson 14; Asts: M. Rashed 5	Arena: Sheikh Saeed Bin Maktoum Sports Hall; Attendance: 300; Referees: Mohammed Al-Tarawneh (JOR), Ahmad Al-Yousef (JOR), Hum Zhung Liang (MAS)

30 August 2026	Bahrain	105–71	Nepal	Dubai
17:00	Scoring by quarter: 25−14, 26−8, 23−18, 31−31
	Pts: Onoduenyi 22; Rebs: Onoduenyi 16; Asts: Qambar, A. Rashed 6	Boxscore	Pts: N. Maharjan 29; Rebs: Kushwaha, B. Maharjan 9 Asts: B. Maharjan, N. Maharjan 4	Arena: Sheikh Saeed Bin Maktoum Sports Hall; Attendance: 100; Referees: Yana Nikogossyan (KAZ), Ho Chang-jen (TPE), Hum Zhung Liang (MAS)

30 August 2026	Oman	89–115	United Arab Emirates	Dubai
20:00	Scoring by quarter: 17–42, 28–20, 25–26, 19–27
	Pts: Al-Shaaibi 24; Rebs: Bakhit 10; Asts: Al-Riyami 6	Boxscore	Pts: Al-Ameri 42; Rebs: Al-Breiki, Dickerson 7 Asts: Dickerson 14	Arena: Sheikh Saeed Bin Maktoum Sports Hall; Attendance: 100; Referees: Ahmad Al-Yousef (JOR), Mohammed Al-Tarawneh (JOR), Rakesh Ramalingaiah (IND)

31 August 2026	Nepal	62–76	Oman	Dubai
17:00	Scoring by quarter: 15–29, 16–8, 20–18, 11–21
	Pts: N. Maharjan 16; Rebs: B. Maharjan, Shah 9 Asts: B. Maharjan 6	Boxscore	Pts: Al-Zahaibi 18; Rebs: Al-Zahaibi, Bakhit 8 Asts: Al-Riyami 9	Arena: Sheikh Saeed Bin Maktoum Sports Hall; Attendance: 50; Referees: Ho Chang-jen (TPE), Yana Nikogossyan (KAZ), Haryanto Sutaryo (INA)

31 August 2026	Kuwait	67–95	Bahrain	Dubai
20:00	Scoring by quarter: 11–19, 19–26, 18–24, 19–26
	Pts: Akbar 18; Rebs: Bin Jawhar 8 Asts: three players 2	Boxscore	Pts: Haji 21; Rebs: Sampson 16; Asts: M. Rashed 6	Arena: Sheikh Saeed Bin Maktoum Sports Hall; Attendance: 120; Referees: Ahmad Al-Yousef (JOR), Rakesh Ramalingaiah (IND), Hum Zhung Liang (MAS)

==== Group B ====
The tournament was held in Almaty, Kazakhstan.

Pos	Team	Pld	W	L	PF	PA	PD	Pts	Qualification
1	Palestine	4	4	0	479	277	+202	8	Second round
2	Kazakhstan (H)	4	3	1	356	248	+108	7	Second round
3	Sri Lanka	4	2	2	300	338	−38	6	Second round
4	Kyrgyzstan	4	1	3	296	307	−11	5	
5	Maldives	4	0	4	223	484	−261	4	

Source: FIBA
Rules for classification: 1) Points; 2) Head-to-head results; 3) Points difference; 4) Points scored.
(H) Hosts

26 August 2026	Maldives	65–107	Sri Lanka	Almaty
16:00	Scoring by quarter: 17−33, 15−27, 14−23, 19−24
	Pts: Irushan 15; Rebs: Irushan 6 Asts: Ali 3	Boxscore	Pts: Supun 39; Rebs: Mendis 19; Asts: Udumalagala 8	Arena: Baluan Sholak Sports Palace; Attendance: 50; Referees: Sergio Kassab (LBN), Lee Ji-youn (KOR), Lim Wee Chun (MAS)

26 August 2026	Palestine	110–69	Kyrgyzstan	Almaty
19:00	Scoring by quarter: 25−18, 37−14, 29−15, 19−22
	Pts: Suleiman 23; Rebs: Mousa 12; Asts: three players 5	Boxscore	Pts: Adylbekov 33; Rebs: Adylbekov 14; Asts: Sereda 4	Arena: Baluan Sholak Sports Palace; Attendance: 50; Referees: Lee Kyoung-hwan (KOR), Khaled Al-Shammari (KUW), Aaron Cañete (PHI)

27 August 2026	Sri Lanka	63–121	Palestine	Almaty
16:00	Scoring by quarter: 16−25, 20−39, 15−25, 12−32
	Pts: Mendis 16; Rebs: Mendis 13; Asts: Supun 4	Boxscore	Pts: Areikat 28; Rebs: Halawani 9 Asts: Qumsieh 4	Arena: Baluan Sholak Sports Palace; Attendance: 100; Referees: Lee Kyoung-hwan (KOR), Aaron Cañete (PHI), Gantumur Ganbayar (MGL)

27 August 2026	Kazakhstan	114–43	Maldives	Almaty
19:00	Scoring by quarter: 39−10, 28−12, 23−10, 24−11
	Pts: Bykov, Murzagaliyev 16; Rebs: three players 7 Asts: Murzagaliyev, Neff 6	Boxscore	Pts: Zabeer 13; Rebs: Zabeer 6 Asts: Shakoor 3	Arena: Baluan Sholak Sports Palace; Attendance: 150; Referees: Sergio Kassab (LBN), Khaled Al-Shammari (KUW), Lim Wee Chun (MAS)

28 August 2026	Kyrgyzstan	65–72	Sri Lanka	Almaty
16:00	Scoring by quarter: 13−12, 20−19, 16−20, 16−21
	Pts: Adylbekov 18; Rebs: Adylbekov 22; Asts: Adylbekov 3	Boxscore	Pts: Yogananthan 27; Rebs: Supun 11; Asts: Udumalagala 8	Arena: Baluan Sholak Sports Palace; Attendance: 300; Referees: Lee Ji-youn (KOR), Khaled Al-Shammari (KUW), Gantumur Ganbayar (MGL)

28 August 2026	Palestine	80–67	Kazakhstan	Almaty
19:00	Scoring by quarter: 22−13, 12−10, 25−25, 21−19
	Pts: Halums 26; Rebs: Mousa 8 Asts: Suleiman 4	Boxscore	Pts: Ivanov 13; Rebs: Ivanov 11; Asts: Rabchenyuk 7	Arena: Baluan Sholak Sports Palace; Attendance: 1,100; Referees: Lee Kyoung-hwan (KOR), Sergio Kassab (LBN), Lim Wee Chun (MAS)

30 August 2026	Maldives	78–168	Palestine	Almaty
16:00	Scoring by quarter: 17–48, 18–37, 17–41, 26–43
	Pts: Irushan 14; Rebs: Shakoor, Neesham 6 Asts: Neesham 8	Boxscore	Pts: Habash 22; Rebs: Mousa 9 Asts: Areikat 14	Arena: Baluan Sholak Sports Palace; Attendance: 200; Referees: Khaled Al-Shammari (KUW), Aaron Cañete (PHI), Gantumur Ganbayar (MGL)

30 August 2026	Kazakhstan	88–67	Kyrgyzstan	Almaty
19:00	Scoring by quarter: 23−18, 26−13, 25−18, 14−18
	Pts: Pan 24; Rebs: Ivanov 11; Asts: Murzagaliyev, Severgin 5	Boxscore	Pts: Adylbekov, Kapakov 17; Rebs: Adylbekov 11; Asts: Tolonov 2	Arena: Baluan Sholak Sports Palace; Attendance: 1,100; Referees: Sergio Kassab (LBN), Lee Ji-youn (KOR), Lee Kyoung-hwan (KOR)

31 August 2026	Kyrgyzstan	95–37	Maldives	Almaty
16:00	Scoring by quarter: 17–15, 29–11, 25–7, 24–4
	Pts: Kubatbekov 18; Rebs: Adylbekov 13; Asts: Kubatbekov, Sereda 4	Boxscore	Pts: Ali 18; Rebs: Neesham 4 Asts: Zabeer 4	Arena: Baluan Sholak Sports Palace; Attendance: 300; Referees: Lee Ji-youn (KOR), Lim Wee Chun (MAS), Gantumur Ganbayar (MGL)

31 August 2026	Sri Lanka	58–87	Kazakhstan	Almaty
19:00	Scoring by quarter: 8−25, 7−26, 20−14, 23−22
	Pts: Mendis 19; Rebs: Mendis 8 Asts: Udumalagala 6	Boxscore	Pts: Kuanov 15; Rebs: Ivanov 11; Asts: Severgin 5	Arena: Baluan Sholak Sports Palace; Attendance: 600; Referees: Lee Kyoung-hwan (KOR), Sergio Kassab (LBN), Aaron Cañete (PHI)

==== Group C ====
The tournament was held in Seremban, Malaysia.

Pos	Team	Pld	W	L	PF	PA	PD	Pts	Qualification
1	Hong Kong	3	3	0	248	173	+75	6	Second round
2	Malaysia (H)	3	2	1	231	196	+35	5	Second round
3	Indonesia	3	1	2	203	202	+1	4	Second round
4	Singapore	3	0	3	169	280	−111	3	

Source: FIBA
Rules for classification: 1) Points; 2) Head-to-head results; 3) Points difference; 4) Points scored.
(H) Hosts

28 August 2026	Indonesia	80–54	Singapore	Seremban
16:00	Scoring by quarter: 18–6, 22–8, 17–14, 23–26
	Pts: Saputera 16; Rebs: Beane 8 Asts: Beane, Disi 4	Boxscore	Pts: Lin 19; Rebs: Chong 8 Asts: Chong 4	Arena: Karisma Arena; Attendance: 150; Referees: Zhang Xiao (CHN), Gao Yijie (CHN), Jennifer Ammoury (LBN)

28 August 2026	Malaysia	54–77	Hong Kong	Seremban
19:00	Scoring by quarter: 14–18, 15–17, 23–16, 2–26
	Pts: Ting 13; Rebs: Bosango 7 Asts: Hiew 3	Boxscore	Pts: G. Yang 19; Rebs: Xu 9 Asts: three players 3	Arena: Karisma Arena; Attendance: 800; Referees: Issam Al-Siyabi (OMA), Lee Seung-mu (KOR), Shigeyuki Arisawa (JPN)

30 August 2026	Hong Kong	71–60	Indonesia	Seremban
16:00	Scoring by quarter: 19–11, 21–13, 10–19, 21–17
	Pts: Tsang 22; Rebs: Yip 8 Asts: Tsang 5	Boxscore	Pts: Beane 14; Rebs: Diagne 11; Asts: Beane, Saputera 4	Arena: Karisma Arena; Attendance: 700; Referees: Shigeyuki Arisawa (JPN), Jennifer Ammoury (LBN), Lê Phạm Trung Kiên (VIE)

30 August 2026	Singapore	56–100	Malaysia	Seremban
19:00	Scoring by quarter: 10–17, 16–34, 19–28, 11–21
	Pts: Helzer 23; Rebs: Mah 5 Asts: Lin 5	Boxscore	Pts: Tiong 33; Rebs: Mahadevan 7 Asts: three players 4	Arena: Karisma Arena; Attendance: 1,300; Referees: Gao Yijie (CHN), Zhang Xiao (CHN), Lee Seung-mu (KOR)

31 August 2026	Hong Kong	100–59	Singapore	Seremban
16:00	Scoring by quarter: 28–14, 29–15, 19–19, 24–11
	Pts: Leung 16; Rebs: I. Yang 13; Asts: Yeung 6	Boxscore	Pts: Belanger 12; Rebs: four players 3 Asts: Mah, Ng 4	Arena: Karisma Arena; Attendance: 425; Referees: Lee Seung-mu (KOR), Shigeyuki Arisawa (JPN), Lê Phạm Trung Kiên (VIE)

31 August 2026	Indonesia	63–77	Malaysia	Seremban
19:00	Scoring by quarter: 11–21, 20–16, 17–20, 15–20
	Pts: Beane 23; Rebs: Diagne 6 Asts: Yonga 3	Boxscore	Pts: Ting 21; Rebs: Bosango 14; Asts: Ja. Lee 4	Arena: Karisma Arena; Attendance: 1,500; Referees: Zhang Xiao (CHN), Gao Yijie (CHN), Jennifer Ammoury (LBN)

==== Group D ====
The tournament was held in Ulaanbaatar, Mongolia.

Pos	Team	Pld	W	L	PF	PA	PD	Pts	Qualification
1	Thailand	3	3	0	272	193	+79	6	Second round
2	Mongolia (H)	3	2	1	266	173	+93	5	Second round
3	Fiji	3	1	2	168	253	−85	4	Second round
4	Vietnam	3	0	3	189	276	−87	3	

Source: FIBA
Rules for classification: 1) Points; 2) Head-to-head results; 3) Points difference; 4) Points scored.
(H) Hosts

28 August 2026	Thailand	94–59	Fiji	Ulaanbaatar
16:00	Scoring by quarter: 22–11, 25–18, 18–23, 29–7
	Pts: Lish 23; Rebs: Ejesu 11; Asts: Leelaphipatkul 6	Boxscore	Pts: McLennan 25; Rebs: Fox 19; Asts: Fox 3	Arena: MBank Arena; Attendance: 330; Referees: Anton Kozlov (KAZ), Wang Wansong (CHN), Mandy Ngieng (MAS)

28 August 2026	Mongolia	98–64	Vietnam	Ulaanbaatar
19:00	Scoring by quarter: 20–12, 29–14, 23–24, 26–14
	Pts: Enkhiin-Od 20; Rebs: Azbayar 10; Asts: Bolor-Erdene 12	Boxscore	Pts: Võ 12; Rebs: Dinh, Nguyễn H. 4 Asts: three players 3	Arena: MBank Arena; Attendance: 1,353; Referees: Haruga Iwai (JPN), Cheon Kam-jae (KOR), Lin Yuan-dian (TPE)

30 August 2026	Vietnam	68–109	Thailand	Ulaanbaatar
16:00	Scoring by quarter: 17–26, 9–31, 20–23, 22–29
	Pts: Nguyễn H. 12; Rebs: Nguyễn H., Lê K. 4 Asts: Dinh, Võ 3	Boxscore	Pts: Ejesu 18; Rebs: Panpet 7 Asts: Jaimsawad 7	Arena: MBank Arena; Attendance: 200; Referees: Haruga Iwai (JPN), Mandy Ngieng (MAS), Ong Jin Leong (SGP)

30 August 2026	Fiji	40–102	Mongolia	Ulaanbaatar
19:00	Scoring by quarter: 11–20, 11–30, 9–31, 9–21
	Pts: Waqabaca 8 Rebs: Fox 6 Asts: Lum Kon 4	Boxscore	Pts: Orgil 16; Rebs: Orgil 7 Asts: Saruul-erdene 6	Arena: MBank Arena; Attendance: 2,700; Referees: Cheon Kam-jae (KOR), Lin Yuan-dian (TPE), Wang Wansong (CHN)

31 August 2026	Vietnam	57–69	Fiji	Ulaanbaatar
16:00	Scoring by quarter: 11–18, 24–11, 6–22, 16–18
	Pts: Dinh, Lê K. 12; Rebs: Nguyễn H. 13; Asts: Dinh, Lê K. 4	Boxscore	Pts: Waqabaca 16; Rebs: Fox 20; Asts: Lum Kon 5	Arena: MBank Arena; Referees: Cheon Kam-jae (KOR), Lin Yuan-dian (TPE), Ong Jin Leong (SGP)

31 August 2026	Thailand	69–66	Mongolia	Ulaanbaatar
19:00	Scoring by quarter: 19–14, 20–19, 18–14, 12–19
	Pts: Ejesu 24; Rebs: Ejesu 13; Asts: Jaimsawad, Lish 4	Boxscore	Pts: Enkhiin-Od 21; Rebs: Enkhiin-Od 17; Asts: Bolor-Erdene 4	Arena: MBank Arena; Attendance: 3,300; Referees: Haruga Iwai (JPN), Anton Kozlov (KAZ), Wang Wansong (CHN)

=== Second round ===
The 12 qualified teams will be divided into two groups of six teams (team from groups A/B form Group E and team from groups C/D into Group F). The results against teams that advance will be carried over and the teams will play against the teams they not met before. The top four teams of each group advance to the qualifiers.

All times are local.

==== Group E ====
The group will be played in Zouk Mikael, Lebanon.

Pos	Team	Pld	W	L	PF	PA	PD	Pts	Qualification
1	Palestine	4	4	0	479	277	+202	8	Qualifiers
2	Bahrain	4	4	0	389	280	+109	8	Qualifiers
3	Kazakhstan	4	3	1	356	248	+108	7	Qualifiers
4	United Arab Emirates	4	3	1	380	308	+72	7	Qualifiers
5	Kuwait	4	2	2	315	298	+17	6	
6	Sri Lanka	4	2	2	300	338	−38	6	

First match(es) will be played: 26 November 2026. Source: FIBA
Rules for classification: 1) Points; 2) Head-to-head results; 3) Points difference; 4) Points scored.

26 November 2026	Sri Lanka	vs.	Bahrain	Zouk Mikael
14:00
		Boxscore		Arena: Nouhad Nawfal Sports Complex

26 November 2026	Kazakhstan	vs.	Kuwait	Zouk Mikael
17:00
		Boxscore		Arena: Nouhad Nawfal Sports Complex

26 November 2026	Palestine	vs.	United Arab Emirates	Zouk Mikael
20:00
		Boxscore		Arena: Nouhad Nawfal Sports Complex

27 November 2026	Bahrain	vs.	Kazakhstan	Zouk Mikael
10:00
		Boxscore		Arena: Nouhad Nawfal Sports Complex

27 November 2026	United Arab Emirates	vs.	Sri Lanka	Zouk Mikael
13:00
		Boxscore		Arena: Nouhad Nawfal Sports Complex

27 November 2026	Kuwait	vs.	Palestine	Zouk Mikael
16:00
		Boxscore		Arena: Nouhad Nawfal Sports Complex

29 November 2026	Sri Lanka	vs.	Kuwait	Zouk Mikael
14:00
		Boxscore		Arena: Nouhad Nawfal Sports Complex

29 November 2026	Kazakhstan	vs.	United Arab Emirates	Zouk Mikael
17:00
		Boxscore		Arena: Nouhad Nawfal Sports Complex

29 November 2026	Palestine	vs.	Bahrain	Zouk Mikael
20:00
		Boxscore		Arena: Nouhad Nawfal Sports Complex

==== Group F ====
The group will be played in Ulaanbaatar, Mongolia.

Pos	Team	Pld	W	L	PF	PA	PD	Pts	Qualification
1	Thailand	3	3	0	272	193	+79	6	Qualifiers
2	Hong Kong	3	3	0	248	173	+75	6	Qualifiers
3	Mongolia	3	2	1	266	173	+93	5	Qualifiers
4	Malaysia	3	2	1	231	196	+35	5	Qualifiers
5	Indonesia	3	1	2	203	202	+1	4	
6	Fiji	3	1	2	168	253	−85	4	

First match(es) will be played: 26 November 2026. Source: FIBA
Rules for classification: 1) Points; 2) Head-to-head results; 3) Points difference; 4) Points scored.

26 November 2026	Fiji	vs.	Hong Kong	Ulaanbaatar
13:00
		Boxscore		Arena: MBank Arena

26 November 2026	Thailand	vs.	Malaysia	Ulaanbaatar
16:00
		Boxscore		Arena: MBank Arena

26 November 2026	Mongolia	vs.	Indonesia	Ulaanbaatar
19:00
		Boxscore		Arena: MBank Arena

27 November 2026	Malaysia	vs.	Fiji	Ulaanbaatar
13:00
		Boxscore		Arena: MBank Arena

27 November 2026	Indonesia	vs.	Thailand	Ulaanbaatar
16:00
		Boxscore		Arena: MBank Arena

27 November 2026	Hong Kong	vs.	Mongolia	Ulaanbaatar
19:00
		Boxscore		Arena: MBank Arena

29 November 2026	Fiji	vs.	Indonesia	Ulaanbaatar
13:00
		Boxscore		Arena: MBank Arena

29 November 2026	Thailand	vs.	Hong Kong	Ulaanbaatar
16:00
		Boxscore		Arena: MBank Arena

29 November 2026	Mongolia	vs.	Malaysia	Ulaanbaatar
19:00
		Boxscore		Arena: MBank Arena

== Qualifiers ==
24 teams will compete for 16 places at the final tournament. Matches will be played over three windows: November 2027, February 2028 and November 2028. They will also earn their place for the qualifiers of the 2031 FIBA Basketball World Cup in France.

=== Participating teams ===
Teams entering the qualifiers (from the 2025 FIBA Asia Cup)		Teams qualified through the regional pre-qualifiers	
West Region	East Region	West Region	East Region
India; Iran; Iraq; Jordan; Lebanon; Qatar; Saudi Arabia; Syria	Australia; China; Chinese Taipei; Guam; Japan; New Zealand; Philippines; South Korea	TBD; TBD; TBD; TBD	TBD; TBD; TBD; TBD

== Final qualifying tournament ==
The six third-placed teams from the qualifiers will play for the final four places at the final tournament. The tournaments will be played in February 2029.
