= 2025–26 Vanderbilt Commodores men's basketball team =

American college basketball season

2025–26 Vanderbilt Commodores men's basketball

Battle 4 Atlantis champions

NCAA tournament, Second round
- Conference: Southeastern Conference

Ranking
- Coaches: No. 17
- AP: No. 19
- Record: 27–9 (11–7 SEC)
- Head coach: Mark Byington (2nd season)
- Assistant coaches: Rick Ray; Jon Cremins; Xavier Joyner; Matt Bucklin; Kenneth Mangrum
- Home arena: Memorial Gymnasium

2025–26 Southeastern Conference men's basketball standings
	Conf.				Overall
Team	W		L	PCT	W		L	PCT
No. 9 Florida	16	–	2	.889	27	–	8	.771
No. 16 Alabama	13	–	5	.722	25	–	10	.714
No. 13 Arkansas †	13	–	5	.722	28	–	9	.757
No. 19 Vanderbilt	11	–	7	.611	27	–	9	.750
No. 12 Tennessee	11	–	7	.611	25	–	12	.676
Texas A&M	11	–	7	.611	22	–	12	.647
Georgia	10	–	8	.556	22	–	11	.667
Missouri	10	–	8	.556	20	–	13	.606
Kentucky	10	–	8	.556	22	–	14	.611
No. 22 Texas	9	–	9	.500	21	–	15	.583
Oklahoma	7	–	11	.389	21	–	16	.568
Auburn	7	–	11	.389	22	–	16	.579
Mississippi State	5	–	13	.278	13	–	19	.406
South Carolina	4	–	14	.222	13	–	19	.406
Ole Miss	4	–	14	.222	15	–	20	.429
LSU	3	–	15	.167	15	–	17	.469
† 2026 SEC tournament winner Rankings from AP poll

The 2025–26 Vanderbilt Commodores men's basketball team represented Vanderbilt University during the 2025–26 NCAA Division I men's basketball season. The team was led by second-year head coach Mark Byington, and played their home games at Memorial Gymnasium located in Nashville, Tennessee as a member of the Southeastern Conference.

== Previous season ==
The Commodores finished the 2024–25 season 20–13, 8–10 in SEC play, to finish in a four way tied for 9th place. As No. 12 seed in the SEC tournament they lost in the first round to Texas. They received an at-large bid to the NCAA tournament as a No. 10 seed in the East Region, where they lost in the first round to Saint Mary's.

== Offseason ==
=== Departures ===
Name	Number	Pos.	Height	Weight	Year	Hometown	Reason for departure
Karris Bilal	0	G	6'2"	190	Freshman	Bloomington, IN	Transferred to Louisiana
Jason Edwards	1	G	6'1"	175	(redshirt) Junior	Atlanta, GA	Transferred to Providence
MJ Collins Jr.	2	G	6'4"	190	Junior	Clover, SC	Transferred to Utah State
Grant Huffman	4	G	6'4"	190	GS senior	Aurora, OH	Graduated
Graham Calton	7	G	6'4"	225	Senior	Charlotte, NC	Walk-on; graduated
Jordan Williams	10	G	6'2"	215	(redshirt) Sophomore	Houston, TX	Walk-on; transferred to Rice
A. J. Hoggard	11	G	6'4"	220	GS senior	Coatesville, PA	Graduated
Alex Hemenway	12	G	6'4"	190	GS senior	Newburgh, IN	Transferred to Evansville
Hollman Smith	21	G	5'10"	185	GS senior	Falls Church, VA	Graduated
Jaylen Carey	22	F	6'8"	265	Sophomore	Davie, FL	Transferred to Tennessee
JaQualon Roberts	24	F	6'8"	230	Sophomore	Bloomington, IN	Transferred to Davidson
Chris Mañon	30	G	6'5"	215	GS senior	New Milford, NJ	Graduated, signed with the Los Angeles Lakers
Kijani Wright	33	F	6'9"	235	Junior	Los Angeles, CA	Transferred

=== Incoming transfers ===
Name	Number	Pos.	Height	Weight	Year	Hometown	Previous school
Mike James	0	G/F	6'6"	220	(redshirt) Junior	Orlando, FL	NC State
Frankie Collins	1	G	6'1"	185	GS senior	Sacramento, CA	TCU
Duke Miles	2	G	6'2"	188	GS senior	Montgomery, AL	Oklahoma
Tyler Harris	8	G	6'8"	190	Junior	Hayward, CA	Washington
AK Okereke	10	F	6'7"	241	Senior	Clovis, CA	Cornell
Jalen Washington	13	F	6'10"	235	Senior	Gary, IN	North Carolina
Mason Nicholson	50	C	6'10"	280	(redshirt) Senior	Gary, IN	Jacksonville State
George Kimble III	9	G	6'2"	184	Junior	Tampa, FL	Eastern Kentucky

=== Recruiting classes ===
==== 2025 recruiting class ====
College recruiting
Name	Hometown	School	Height	Weight	Commit date
Jaylon Dean-Vines #38 SG	Dallas, TX	PHH Prep	6 ft 2 in (1.88 m)	180 lb (82 kg)	Sep 8, 2024
Jaylon Dean-Vines #38 SG	Recruit ratings: Rivals: 247Sports: ESPN: (78)				
Jayden Leverett; C	El Paso, TX	Chapin High School	6 ft 11 in (2.11 m)	205 lb (93 kg)	Oct 19, 2024
Jayden Leverett; C	Recruit ratings: Rivals: 247Sports: ESPN: (NR)				
Chandler Bing; SF	Atlanta, GA	Pace Academy	6 ft 6 in (1.98 m)	190 lb (86 kg)	Jun 19, 2024
Chandler Bing; SF	Recruit ratings: Rivals: 247Sports: ESPN: (NR)				
Overall recruit ranking:
Note: In many cases, Scout, Rivals, 247Sports, On3, and ESPN may conflict in their listings of height and weight.; In these cases, the average was taken. ESPN grades are on a 100-point scale.; Sources: "Vanderbilt 2025 Basketball Commitments". Rivals.; "ESPN". ESPN.; "2025 Team Ranking". Rivals.

== Roster ==
2025–26 Vanderbilt Commodores men's basketball team
Players
Coaches

Pos.	#	Name	Height	Weight	Year	Previous school	Hometown
G/F	0	Mike James	6 ft 5 in (1.96 m)	198 lb (90 kg)	RS Jr	NC State	Orlando, FL
G	1	Frankie Collins	6 ft 1 in (1.85 m)	205 lb (93 kg)	GS	TCU	Sacramento, CA
G	2	Duke Miles	6 ft 2 in (1.88 m)	180 lb (82 kg)	GS	Oklahoma	Montgomery, AL
G	3	Tyler Tanner	6 ft 0 in (1.83 m)	173 lb (78 kg)	So	Brentwood Academy	Brentwood, TN
G/F	5	Tyler Nickel	6 ft 7 in (2.01 m)	220 lb (100 kg)	Jr	Virginia Tech	Harrisonburg, VA
F	7	Chandler Bing	6 ft 5 in (1.96 m)	211 lb (96 kg)	Fr	Pace Academy	Atlanta, GA
G	8	Tyler Harris	6 ft 7 in (2.01 m)	202 lb (92 kg)	Jr	Washington	Hayward, CA
G	9	George Kimble III	6 ft 2 in (1.88 m)	184 lb (83 kg)	Jr	Eastern Kentucky	Tampa, FL
F	10	AK Okereke	6 ft 7 in (2.01 m)	244 lb (111 kg)	Sr	Cornell	Clovis, CA
G	12	Jaylon Dean-Vines	6 ft 4 in (1.93 m)	181 lb (82 kg)	Fr	Kimball	Dallas, TX
F	13	Jalen Washington	6 ft 10 in (2.08 m)	240 lb (109 kg)	Sr	North Carolina	Gary, IN
G	15	Coleson Messer (W)	6 ft 4 in (1.93 m)	210 lb (95 kg)	RS So	Highland Park HS	Dallas, TX
G	25	Miles Keeffe (W)	6 ft 5 in (1.96 m)	200 lb (91 kg)	Sr	Southern California Academy	Novato, CA
C	34	Jayden Leverett	6 ft 11 in (2.11 m)	245 lb (111 kg)	Fr	Chapin	El Paso, TX
C	50	Mason Nicholson	6 ft 9 in (2.06 m)	307 lb (139 kg)	RS Sr	Jacksonville State	Gary, IN
F	99	Devin McGlockton	6 ft 7 in (2.01 m)	215 lb (98 kg)	RS Sr	Boston College	Cumming, GA

Head coach

- Mark Byington (UNC Wilmington)

Assistant coach(es)

- Rick Ray (Grand View College)
- Jon Cremins (Valdosta State)
- Xavier Joyner (Husson)
- Matt Bucklin (Georgia)
- Kenneth Mangrum (North Texas)

Legend

- (C) Team captain
- (S) Suspended
- (I) Ineligible
- (W) Walk-on
- Injured
- Current redshirt

Roster

== Schedule and results ==
Date time, TV	Rank^{#}	Opponent^{#}	Result	Record	High points	High rebounds	High assists	Site (attendance) city, state
Exhibition
October 16, 2025*; 6:30 p.m.		Virginia	W 95–87		–	–	–	Memorial Gymnasium; Nashville, TN
Non-conference regular season
November 3, 2025*; 7:00 p.m., SECN+/ESPN+		Lipscomb	W 105–61	1–0	20 – Nickel	12 – McGlockton	9 – Miles	Memorial Gymnasium (6,577); Nashville, TN
November 8, 2025*; 3:00 p.m., ESPN+		at UCF	W 105–93	2–0	20 – Miles	6 – Tied	5 – Collins	Addition Financial Arena (6,018); Orlando, FL
November 12, 2025*; 7:00 p.m., SECN+/ESPN+		Eastern Kentucky	W 92–62	3–0	17 – Harris	7 – Tied	5 – Tied	Memorial Gymnasium (5,677); Nashville, TN
November 15, 2025*; 2:00 p.m., SECN+/ESPN+		Arkansas–Pine Bluff	W 104–75	4–0	20 – Miles	9 – McGlockton	9 – Tanner	Memorial Gymnasium (6,435); Nashville, TN
November 20, 2025*; 6:00 p.m., SECN+/ESPN+		Texas Southern	W 109–74	5–0	20 – Tied	8 – Harris	7 – Tanner	Memorial Gymnasium (5,673); Nashville, TN
November 26, 2025*; 11:00 a.m., ESPN	No. 24	vs. Western Kentucky; Battle 4 Atlantis quarterfinals	W 83–78	6–0	28 – Miles	6 – Tied	9 – Collins	Imperial Arena (437); Nassau, Bahamas
November 27, 2025*; 11:00 a.m., ESPN	No. 24	vs. VCU; Battle 4 Atlantis semifinals	W 89–74	7–0	20 – Miles	8 – Washington	5 – Tanner	Imperial Arena (417); Nassau, Bahamas
November 28, 2025*; 12:00 p.m., ESPN2	No. 24	vs. Saint Mary's; Battle 4 Atlantis championship	W 96–71	8–0	25 – Miles	7 – McGlockton	6 – Collins	Imperial Arena (890); Nassau, Bahamas
December 3, 2025*; 8:00 pm., SECN	No. 17	SMU; ACC–SEC Challenge	W 88–69	9–0	26 – Tanner	8 – McGlockton	6 – Tanner	Memorial Gymnasium (7,437); Nashville, TN
December 13, 2025*; 5:30 p.m., SECN	No. 15	Central Arkansas	W 83–72	10–0	30 – Nickel	10 – McGlockton	7 – Tanner	Memorial Gymnasium (7,227); Nashville, TN
December 17, 2025*; 6:00 pm., ESPN2	No. 13	at Memphis	W 77–70 ^{OT}	11–0	22 – Miles	8 – McGlockton	5 – Miles	FedExForum (11,407); Memphis, TN
December 21, 2025*; 12:00 pm., The CW	No. 13	at Wake Forest	W 98–67	12–0	26 – Nickel	7 – McGlockton	9 – Miles	LJVM Coliseum (7,605); Winston-Salem, NC
December 29, 2025*; 6:00 p.m., SECN+/ESPN+	No. 11	New Haven	W 96–53	13–0	23 – Tanner	10 – McGlockton	7 – Tanner	Memorial Gymnasium (8,314); Nashville, TN
SEC regular season
January 3, 2026; 1:00 pm., ESPNU	No. 11	at South Carolina	W 83–71	14–0 (1–0)	19 – Tanner	8 – Washington	14 – Tanner	Colonial Life Arena (9,760); Columbia, SC
January 7, 2026; 8:00 pm., ESPN2	No. 11	No. 13 Alabama	W 96–90	15–0 (2–0)	29 – Tanner	12 – McGlockton	7 – Tanner	Memorial Gymnasium (11,429); Nashville, TN
January 10, 2026; 12:00 pm., SECN	No. 11	LSU	W 84–73	16–0 (3–0)	20 – Tanner	10 – Nickel	5 – Miles	Memorial Gymnasium (9,399); Nashville, TN
January 14, 2026; 8:00 pm., ESPN2	No. 10	at Texas	L 64–80	16–1 (3–1)	21 – Miles	7 – McGlockton	4 – Miles	Moody Center (11,422); Austin, TX
January 17, 2026; 1:00 pm., ESPN	No. 10	No. 19 Florida	L 94–98	16–2 (3–2)	20 – Tanner	6 – Miles	5 – Tanner	Memorial Gymnasium (14,316); Nashville, TN
January 20, 2026; 8:00 pm., ESPN	No. 15	at No. 20 Arkansas	L 68–93	16–3 (3–3)	17 – Nickel	7 – Washington	6 – Tanner	Bud Walton Arena (19,200); Fayetteville, AR
January 24, 2026; 11:00 am, SECN+/ESPN+	No. 15	at Mississippi State	W 88–56	17–3 (4–3)	24 – Tanner	8 – Washington	5 – Tanner	Humphrey Coliseum (7,597); Starkville, MS
January 27, 2026; 8:00 pm., ESPN	No. 18	Kentucky	W 80–55	18–3 (5–3)	19 – Tied	12 – McGlockton	5 – Tanner	Memorial Gymnasium (10,195); Nashville, TN
January 31, 2026; 5:00 pm., SECN	No. 18	Ole Miss	W 71–68	19–3 (6–3)	24 – Tanner	9 – James	3 – Tanner	Memorial Gymnasium (11,760); Nashville, TN
February 7, 2026; 2:30 pm., SECN	No. 15	Oklahoma	L 91–92	19–4 (6–4)	37 – Tanner	10 – Washington	9 – Tanner	Memorial Gymnasium (10,892); Nashville, TN
February 10, 2026; 6:00 pm., SECN	No. 19	at Auburn	W 84–76	20–4 (7–4)	25 – Tanner	7 – McGlockton	6 – Tanner	Neville Arena (9,121); Auburn, AL
February 14, 2026; 12:00 pm., SECN	No. 19	Texas A&M	W 82–69	21–4 (8–4)	25 – Nickel	8 – Tied	6 – Tanner	Memorial Gymnasium (8,378); Nashville, TN
February 18, 2026; 8:00 pm., SECN	No. 19	at Missouri	L 80–81	21–5 (8–5)	27 – Tanner	7 – McGlockton	5 – Tanner	Mizzou Arena (10,234); Columbia, MO
February 21, 2026; 1:00 pm., ESPN	No. 19	Tennessee; Rivalry	L 65–69	21–6 (8–6)	16 – Tanner	10 – Washington	6 – Miles	Memorial Gymnasium (14,316); Nashville, TN
February 25, 2026; 6:00 pm., SECN	No. 25	Georgia	W 88–80	22–6 (9–6)	17 – Tied	10 – McGlockton	6 – Okereke	Memorial Gymnasium (10,460); Nashville, TN
February 28, 2026; 1:00 pm., ESPN	No. 25	at Kentucky	L 77–91	22–7 (9–7)	19 – Tanner	7 – Washington	7 – Miles	Rupp Arena; Lexington, KY
March 4, 2026; 8:00 pm, SECN+	No. 24	at Ole Miss	W 89–86 ^{OT}	23–7 (10–7)	34 – Tanner	14 – McGlockton	7 – Tanner	SJB Pavilion (7,300); Oxford, MS
March 7, 2026; 1:00 pm, ESPN	No. 24	at No. 23 Tennessee; Rivalry	W 86–82	24–7 (11–7)	25 – Tanner	8 – Washington	3 – Tied	Thompson–Boling Arena (19,654); Knoxville, TN
SEC tournament
March 13, 2026; 2:30 pm, ESPN	(4) No. 22	vs. (5) No. 25 Tennessee; Quarterfinal	W 75–68	25–7	30 – Miles	7 – Washington	5 – Miles	Bridgestone Arena (17,864); Nashville, TN
March 13, 2026; 2:30 pm, ESPN	(4) No. 22	vs. (1) No. 5 Florida; Semifinal	W 91–74	26–7	20 – Tanner	4 – Tied	8 – Tanner	Bridgestone Arena (16,612); Nashville, TN
March 14, 2026; 12:00 pm, ESPN	(4) No. 22	vs. (3) No. 17 Arkansas; Championship	L 75–86	26–8	19 – Tied	9 – Nickel	9 – Miles	Bridgestone Arena (18,377); Nashville, TN
NCAA tournament
March 19, 2026*; 2:15 pm, TruTV	(5 S) No. 16	vs. (12 S) McNeese; First round	W 78–68	27–8	26 – Tanner	9 – Okereke	5 – Tanner	Paycom Center (15,677); Oklahoma City, OK
March 21, 2026; 7:45 p.m., TNT	(5 S) No. 16	vs. (4 S) No. 15 Nebraska; Second round	L 72–74	27–9	27 – Tanner	8 – McGlockton	6 – Miles	Paycom Center (14,887); Oklahoma City, OK
*Non-conference game. ^{#}Rankings from AP poll. (#) Tournament seedings in parentheses. S=South. All times are in Central Time.

== Rankings ==
Ranking movements Legend: ██ Increase in ranking ██ Decrease in ranking RV = Received votes
	Week																				
Poll	Pre	1	2	3	4	5	6	7	8	9	10	11	12	13	14	15	16	17	18	19	Final
AP	RV	RV	RV	24	17	15	13	11	11	11	10	15	18	15	19	19	25	24	22	16	19
Coaches	RV	RV	24	23	16	14	12	11	11	10	8	14	15	15	20	18	21	22	22	16	17

== See also ==
- 2025–26 Vanderbilt Commodores women's basketball team
