= 2025–26 Ole Miss Rebels men's basketball team =

American college basketball season

2025–26 Ole Miss Rebels men's basketball
- Conference: Southeastern Conference
- Record: 15–20 (4–14 SEC)
- Head coach: Chris Beard (3rd season)
- Assistant coaches: Mark Adams (2nd season); Brian Burg (3rd season); Bob Donewald Jr. (3rd season); Wes Flanigan (3rd season); Al Pinkins (3rd, 6th overall season)
- Home arena: SJB Pavilion

2025–26 Southeastern Conference men's basketball standings
	Conf.				Overall
Team	W		L	PCT	W		L	PCT
No. 4 Florida	16	–	2	.889	26	–	7	.788
No. 18 Alabama	13	–	5	.722	23	–	9	.719
No. 14 Arkansas †	13	–	5	.722	26	–	8	.765
No. 16 Vanderbilt	11	–	7	.611	26	–	8	.765
No. 23т Tennessee	11	–	7	.611	22	–	11	.667
Texas A&M	11	–	7	.611	21	–	11	.656
Georgia	10	–	8	.556	22	–	10	.688
Missouri	10	–	8	.556	20	–	12	.625
Kentucky	10	–	8	.556	21	–	13	.618
Texas	9	–	9	.500	18	–	14	.563
Oklahoma	7	–	11	.389	19	–	15	.559
Auburn	7	–	11	.389	17	–	16	.515
Mississippi State	5	–	13	.278	13	–	19	.406
South Carolina	4	–	14	.222	13	–	19	.406
Ole Miss	4	–	14	.222	15	–	20	.429
LSU	3	–	15	.167	15	–	17	.469
† 2026 SEC tournament winner As of March 15, 2026; Rankings from AP poll

The 2025–26 Ole Miss Rebels men's basketball team represented the University of Mississippi during the 2025–26 NCAA Division I men's basketball season. The Rebels, led by third-year head coach, Chris Beard, played their home games at The Sandy and John Black Pavilion at Ole Miss in Oxford, Mississippi, and compete as members of the Southeastern Conference.

== Previous season ==
The Rebels finished the 2024–25 season 24–12, 10–8 in SEC play to finish in a tie for sixth place in the conference. In the 2025 SEC tournament, held at Bridgestone Arena in Nashville, Tennessee, the Rebels defeated Arkansas, 83−80, in the second round before losing to Auburn, 62–57 in the quarterfinals. In the 2025 NCAA Division I men's basketball tournament, the Rebels defeated North Carolina, 71–64, in the first round, and Iowa State, 91–78, in the second round to reach their first Sweet Sixteen since 2001, and only the second in school history, where they eventually fell to Michigan State, 73–70.

== Offseason ==
=== Departures ===
Ole Miss Departures
Name	Number	Pos.	Height	Weight	Year	Hometown	Notes	Ref.
Mikeal Brown-Jones	1	F	6'8"	220	Senior	Philadelphia, Pennsylvania	Graduated	
TJ Caldwell	2	G	6'4"	190	Junior	Dallas, Texas	Transferred to Arkansas State	
Sean Pedulla	3	G	6'1"	195	Senior	Edmond, Oklahoma	Graduated	
Jaemyn Brakefield	4	F	6'8"	220	Senior	Jackson, Mississippi	Graduated	
Jaylen Murray	5	G	5'11"	175	Senior	The Bronx, New York	Graduated	
Robert Cowherd	6	G	6'5"	195	Junior	Grayson, Georgia	Transferred to Southern Miss	
Davon Barnes	7	G	6'5"	215	Senior	Memphis, Tennessee	Graduated	
John Bol	10	C	7'1"	190	Freshman	Boma, South Sudan	Transferred to UCF	
Matthew Murrell	11	G	6'4"	200	Senior	Memphis, Tennessee	Graduated	
Dre Davis	14	F	6'6"	210	Senior	Indianapolis, Indiana	Graduated	
Ja'Von Benson	21	F	6'8"	250	Senior	Columbia, South Carolina	Graduated	

=== Incoming transfers ===
Incoming transfers
Name	Number	Pos.	Height	Weight	Year	Hometown	Previous School
Augusto Cassiá	88	F	6'8"	220	Junior	Salvador, Brazil	Butler
Corey Chest	1	F	6'7"	220	Sophomore	New Orleans, Louisiana	LSU
Kezza Giffa	13	G	6'1"	175	Senior	Paris, France	High Point
Hobert Grayson IV	5	F	6'5"	195	Senior	Gonzales, Louisiana	Ouachita Baptist
Koren Johnson	3	G	6'1"	175	Junior	Seattle, Washington	Louisville
Ilias Kamardine	6	G	6'4"	180	Senior	Marseille, France	JDA Dijon Basket
Travis Perry	11	G	6'1"	190	Sophomore	Eddyville, Kentucky	Kentucky
James Scott	4	F	6'11"	220	Junior	Fayetteville, North Carolina	Louisville
AJ Storr	2	G	6'5"	205	Senior	Rockford, Illinois	Kansas

=== 2025 recruiting class ===
College recruiting information
Name	Hometown	School	Height	Weight	Commit date
Niko Bundalo #6 PF	Canton, Ohio	Prolific Prep	6 ft 10 in (2.08 m)	205 lb (93 kg)	May 20, 2025
Niko Bundalo #6 PF	Recruit ratings: Rivals: 247Sports: ESPN: (87)				
Tylis Jordan #11 PF	Milledgeville, Georgia	Wheeler HS	6 ft 9 in (2.06 m)	210 lb (95 kg)	Jun 21, 2024
Tylis Jordan #11 PF	Recruit ratings: Rivals: 247Sports: ESPN: (82)				
Patton Pinkins #13 SG	Lubbock, Texas	Frenship HS	6 ft 5 in (1.96 m)	205 lb (93 kg)	Jun 21, 2024
Patton Pinkins #13 SG	Recruit ratings: Rivals: 247Sports: ESPN: (82)				
Overall recruit ranking: 247Sports: 14
Note: In many cases, Scout, Rivals, 247Sports, On3, and ESPN may conflict in their listings of height and weight.; In these cases, the average was taken. ESPN grades are on a 100-point scale.; Sources: "Ole Miss 2025 Basketball Commitments". Rivals.; "2025 Team Ranking". Rivals.

== Roster ==
2025–26 Ole Miss Rebels men's basketball team
Players
Coaches

Pos.	#	Name	Height	Weight	Year	Previous school	Hometown
F	0	Malik Dia	6 ft 9 in (2.06 m)	240 lb (109 kg)	Sr	Belmont	Murfreesboro, TN
F	1	Corey Chest	6 ft 7 in (2.01 m)	220 lb (100 kg)	So	LSU	New Orleans, LA
G	2	AJ Storr	6 ft 5 in (1.96 m)	205 lb (93 kg)	Sr	Kansas	Rockford, IL
G	3	Koren Johnson	6 ft 1 in (1.85 m)	175 lb (79 kg)	Jr	Louisville	Seattle, WA
F	4	James Scott	6 ft 11 in (2.11 m)	220 lb (100 kg)	Jr	Louisville	Fayetteville, NC
F	5	Hobert Grayson	6 ft 5 in (1.96 m)	195 lb (88 kg)	Sr	Ouachita Baptist	Gonzales, LA
G	6	Ilias Kamardine	6 ft 4 in (1.93 m)	180 lb (82 kg)	Sr	JDA Dijon Basket	Marseille, France
F	7	Niko Bundalo	6 ft 10 in (2.08 m)	205 lb (93 kg)	Fr	Prolific Prep	Canton, OH
G	8	Eduardo Klafke	6 ft 4 in (1.93 m)	180 lb (82 kg)	So	NBA Academy	Franca, Brazil
F	10	Tylis Jordan	6 ft 9 in (2.06 m)	210 lb (95 kg)	Fr	Wheeler HS	Milledgeville, GA
G	11	Travis Perry	6 ft 1 in (1.85 m)	190 lb (86 kg)	So	Kentucky	Eddyville, KY
G	13	Kezza Giffa	6 ft 1 in (1.85 m)	175 lb (79 kg)	Sr	High Point	Paris, France
G	22	Max Smith (W)	6 ft 1 in (1.85 m)	175 lb (79 kg)	Sr	Anderson HS	Austin, TX
G	23	Patton Pinkins	6 ft 5 in (1.96 m)	205 lb (93 kg)	Fr	Frenship HS	Lubbock, TX
G	31	Zach Day	6 ft 5 in (1.96 m)	185 lb (84 kg)	Fr	Midland Christian	Midland, TX
F	88	Augusto Cassiá	6 ft 8 in (2.03 m)	220 lb (100 kg)	Jr	Butler	Salvador, Brazil

Head coach

- Chris Beard (Texas)

Assistant coach(es)

- Mark Adams (Texas Tech)
- Brian Burg (Mount Mercy)
- Bob Donewald Jr. (Western Michigan)
- Wes Flanigan (Auburn)
- Al Pinkins (NC State)

Legend

- (C) Team captain
- (S) Suspended
- (I) Ineligible
- (W) Walk-on
- Injured
- Current redshirt

Roster

== Schedule and results ==
Date time, TV	Rank^{#}	Opponent^{#}	Result	Record	High points	High rebounds	High assists	Site (attendance) city, state
Exhibition
October 26, 2025*; 11:30 am		Saint Mary's	L 53–68		–	–	–	SJB Pavilion; Oxford, MS
Non-conference regular season
November 3, 2025*; 7:00 pm, SECN+/ESPN+		Southeastern Louisiana	W 88–58	1–0	20 – Dia	9 – Scott	4 – Tied	SJB Pavilion (8,883); Oxford, MS
November 7, 2025*; 6:30 pm, SECN+/ESPN+		Louisiana–Monroe	W 86–65	2–0	19 – Storr	9 – Chest	7 – Kamardine	SJB Pavilion (8,212); Oxford, MS
November 11, 2025*; 8:00 pm, SECN		Memphis; Rivalry	W 83–77	3–0	26 – Kamardine	7 – Scott	5 – Giffa	SJB Pavilion (8,731); Oxford, MS
November 14, 2025*; 6:30 pm, SECN+/ESPN+		Cal State Bakersfield; Rod Barnes Tad Pad game	W 82–60	4–0	14 – Storr	6 – Dia	3 – Tied	Tad Smith Coliseum (4,362); Oxford, MS
November 18, 2025*; 7:00 pm, SECN+/ESPN+		Austin Peay; Acrisure Series on-campus game	W 72–65	5–0	18 – Dia	7 – Tied	7 – Kamardine	SJB Pavilion (7,473); Oxford, MS
November 25, 2025*; 8:30 pm, CBSSN		vs. Iowa; Acrisure Classic semifinals	L 69–74	5–1	22 – Storr	8 – Scott	4 – Kamardine	Acrisure Arena; Palm Desert, CA
November 26, 2025*; 11:00 pm, CBSSN		vs. Utah; Acrisure Classic third-place game	L 74–75	5–2	17 – Dia	9 – Dia	3 – Tied	Acrisure Arena; Palm Desert, CA
December 2, 2025*; 8:00 pm, SECN		Miami (FL); ACC–SEC Challenge	L 66–75	5–3	11 – Tied	9 – Dia	6 – Kamardine	SJB Pavilion (9,373); Oxford, MS
December 6, 2025*; 7:00 pm, Peacock/NBCSN		at No. 23 St. John's	L 58–63	5–4	18 – Dia	10 – Tied	2 – Tied	Madison Square Garden (14,799); New York, NY
December 13, 2025*; 2:00 pm, SECN+/ESPN+		vs. Southern Miss; Mississippi Coast Coliseum Classic	W 71–67	6–4	21 – Storr	6 – Tied	2 – Tied	Mississippi Coast Coliseum; Biloxi, MS
December 17, 2025*; 7:00 pm, SECN+/ESPN+		vs. Alabama A&M	W 80–66	7–4	27 – Dia	7 – Tied	8 – Kamardine	Cadence Bank Arena (2,317); Tupelo, MS
December 21, 2025*; 12:00 pm, ESPN		vs. NC State	L 62–76	7–5	21 – Perry	11 – Dia	3 – Klafke	First Horizon Coliseum; Greensboro, NC
December 29, 2025*; 7:00 pm, SECN		Alcorn State	W 79–43	8–5	14 – Giffa	11 – Tied	4 – Pinkins	SJB Pavilion (8,362); Oxford, MS
SEC regular season
January 3, 2026; 2:30 pm, SECN		at Oklahoma	L 70–86	8–6 (0–1)	25 – Pinkins	6 – Dia	2 – Tied	Lloyd Noble Center (7,040); Norman, OK
January 7, 2026; 8:00 pm, SECN		No. 15 Arkansas	L 87–94	8–7 (0–2)	16 – Tied	6 – Dia	4 – Kamardine	SJB Pavilion (8,012); Oxford, MS
January 10, 2026; 5:00 pm, SECN		Missouri	W 76–69	9–7 (1–2)	26 – Storr	11 – Dia	5 – Johnson	SJB Pavilion (7,859); Oxford, MS
January 14, 2026; 6:00 pm, ESPNU		at No. 21 Georgia	W 97–95 ^{OT}	10–7 (2–2)	27 – Storr	9 – Chest	6 – Kamardine	Stegeman Coliseum (10,523); Athens, GA
January 17, 2026; 7:30 pm, SECN		at Mississippi State; Rivalry	W 68–67	11–7 (3–2)	17 – Tied	11 – Dia	5 – Kamardine	Humphrey Coliseum (9,212); Starkville, MS
January 20, 2026; 8:00 pm, ESPNU		Auburn	L 66–78	11–8 (3–3)	18 – Storr	5 – Tied	4 – Storr	SJB Pavilion (9,530); Oxford, MS
January 24, 2026; 10:00 am, ESPN		at Kentucky	L 63–72	11–9 (3–4)	20 – Storr	10 – Chest	4 – Kamardine	Rupp Arena (19,831); Lexington, KY
January 31, 2026; 5:00 pm, SECN		at No. 18 Vanderbilt	L 68–71	11–10 (3–5)	16 – Tied	5 – Kamardine	1 – Tied	Memorial Gymnasium (11,760); Nashville, TN
February 3, 2026; 6:00 pm, ESPN2		at No. 25 Tennessee	L 66–84	11–11 (3–6)	15 – Tied	4 – Tied	1 – Tied	Thompson–Boling Arena (18,882); Knoxville, TN
February 7, 2026; 1:00 pm, ESPN2		at Texas	L 68–79	11–12 (3–7)	14 – Klafke	6 – Tied	3 – Tied	Moody Center; Austin, TX
February 11, 2026; 6:00 pm, SECN		Alabama	L 74–93	11–13 (3–8)	27 – Storr	9 – Klafke	5 – Kamardine	SJB Pavilion (8,148); Oxford, MS
February 14, 2026; 5:30 pm, ESPN2		Mississippi State; Rivalry	L 78–90	11–14 (3–9)	32 – Dia	7 – Dia	5 – Tied	SJB Pavilion (8,476); Oxford, MS
February 18, 2026; 6:00 pm, SECN		at Texas A&M	L 77–80	11–15 (3–10)	21 – Storr	5 – Dia	6 – Johnson	Reed Arena (8,594); College Station, TX
February 21, 2026; 11:00 am, ESPN		No. 12 Florida	L 75–94	11–16 (3–11)	24 – Dia	6 – Dia	4 – Perry	SJB Pavilion (8,051); Oxford, MS
February 25, 2026; 8:00 pm, SECN		LSU	L 99–106 ^{2OT}	11–17 (3–12)	26 – Kamardine	7 – Tied	10 – Kamardine	SJB Pavilion (7,357); Oxford, MS
February 28, 2026; 7:30 pm, SECN		at Auburn	W 85–79	12–17 (4–12)	26 – Tied	8 – Klafke	4 – Tied	Neville Arena (9,121); Auburn, AL
March 3, 2026; 8:00 pm, SECN+		No. 24 Vanderbilt	L 86–89 ^{OT}	12–18 (4–13)	16 – Pinkins	11 – Chest	3 – Scott	SJB Pavilion (7,300); Oxford, MS
March 7, 2026; 12:00 pm, SECN		South Carolina	L 61–64	12–19 (4–14)	22 – Dia	6 – Klafke	4 – Kamardine	SJB Pavilion (7,543); Oxford, MS
SEC tournament
March 11, 2026; 6:00 p.m., SECN	(15)	vs. (10) Texas; First round	W 76–66	13–19	23 – Dia	9 – Scott	3 – Kamardine	Bridgestone Arena (10,701); Nashville, TN
March 12, 2026; 6:00 p.m., SECN	(15)	vs. (7) Georgia; Second round	W 76–72	14–19	19 – Storr	13 – Scott	4 – Kamardine	Bridgestone Arena (11,457); Nashville, TN
March 13, 2026; 6:00 p.m., SECN	(15)	vs. (2) No. 15 Alabama; Quarterfinal	W 80–79	15–19	17 – Storr	10 – Scott	4 – Kamardine	Bridgestone Arena (15,085); Nashville, TN
March 14, 2026; 2:30 p.m., ESPN	(15)	vs. (3) No. 17 Arkansas; Semifinal	L 90–93 ^{OT}	15–20	24 – Storr	9 – Scott	3 – Tied	Bridgestone Arena; Nashville, TN
*Non-conference game. ^{#}Rankings from AP Poll. (#) Tournament seedings in parentheses. All times are in Central Time.

== See also ==
- 2025–26 Ole Miss Rebels women's basketball team
