= 2025–26 LSU Tigers men's basketball team =

American college basketball season

2025–26 LSU Tigers men's basketball

Emerald Coast Classic champions
- Conference: Southeastern Conference
- Record: 15–17 (3–15 SEC)
- Head coach: Matt McMahon (4th season)
- Associate head coach: David Patrick
- Assistant coaches: Casey Long; Jalen Courtney-Williams; Tasmin Mitchell; Vince Walden
- Home arena: Pete Maravich Assembly Center

2025–26 Southeastern Conference men's basketball standings
	Conf.				Overall
Team	W		L	PCT	W		L	PCT
No. 9 Florida	16	–	2	.889	27	–	8	.771
No. 16 Alabama	13	–	5	.722	25	–	10	.714
No. 13 Arkansas †	13	–	5	.722	28	–	9	.757
No. 19 Vanderbilt	11	–	7	.611	27	–	9	.750
No. 12 Tennessee	11	–	7	.611	25	–	12	.676
Texas A&M	11	–	7	.611	22	–	12	.647
Georgia	10	–	8	.556	22	–	11	.667
Missouri	10	–	8	.556	20	–	13	.606
Kentucky	10	–	8	.556	22	–	14	.611
No. 22 Texas	9	–	9	.500	21	–	15	.583
Oklahoma	7	–	11	.389	21	–	16	.568
Auburn	7	–	11	.389	22	–	16	.579
Mississippi State	5	–	13	.278	13	–	19	.406
South Carolina	4	–	14	.222	13	–	19	.406
Ole Miss	4	–	14	.222	15	–	20	.429
LSU	3	–	15	.167	15	–	17	.469
† 2026 SEC tournament winner Rankings from AP poll

The 2025–26 LSU Tigers men's basketball team represented Louisiana State University during the 2025–26 NCAA Division I men's basketball season. The Tigers, led by fourth-year head coach Matt McMahon, played their home games at Pete Maravich Assembly Center located in Baton Rouge, Louisiana as members of the Southeastern Conference. They finished the season 15–17, 3–15 in SEC play to finish in last place. They lost to Kentucky in the first round of the SEC tournament.

On March 26, 2026, the school fired head coach Matt McMahon and immediately re-hired former LSU coach Will Wade as the team's new head coach. McMahon was hired after Wade was fired from LSU in 2022.

== Previous season ==
The Tigers finished the 2024–25 season 14–18, 3–15 in SEC Play to finish in 15th place. The Tigers were defeated in the first round of the SEC tournament by Mississippi State for the second consecutive season.

== Roster ==
2025–26 LSU Tigers men's basketball team
Players
Coaches

Pos.	#	Name	Height	Weight	Year	Previous school	Hometown
G	0	Mazi Mosley	6 ft 5 in (1.96 m)	169 lb (77 kg)	Fr	Prolific Prep	Los Angeles, CA
F	1	Mike Nwoko	6 ft 10 in (2.08 m)	261 lb (118 kg)	Jr	Mississippi State	Toronto, ON
G	2	Jalen Reece	6 ft 0 in (1.83 m)	185 lb (84 kg)	Fr	Oak Ridge HS	Orlando, FL
G	3	Max Mackinnon	6 ft 6 in (1.98 m)	195 lb (88 kg)	Sr	Portland	Brisbane, QLD
G	4	Rashad King	6 ft 6 in (1.98 m)	217 lb (98 kg)	Sr	Northeastern	Evans, GA
F	5	Marcus Vaughns	6 ft 8 in (2.03 m)	221 lb (100 kg)	Fr	Centre of Excellence	Melbourne, VIC
F	6	Robert Miller III	6 ft 10 in (2.08 m)	230 lb (104 kg)	So	Pasadena Memorial HS	Houston, TX
G	7	PJ Carter	6 ft 4 in (1.93 m)	183 lb (83 kg)	Sr	Memphis	Atlanta, GA
F	8	Pablo Tamba	6 ft 7 in (2.01 m)	206 lb (93 kg)	GS	UC Davis	Málaga, Spain
F	9	Jalen Reed	6 ft 10 in (2.08 m)	245 lb (111 kg)	RS Jr	Southern California Academy	Jackson, MS
F	10	Marquel Sutton	6 ft 9 in (2.06 m)	225 lb (102 kg)	Sr	Omaha	Tulsa, OK
G	11	Dedan Thomas Jr.	6 ft 1 in (1.85 m)	178 lb (81 kg)	Jr	UNLV	Las Vegas, NV
F	13	Matt Gilhool	6 ft 11 in (2.11 m)	213 lb (97 kg)	Fr	William Penn Charter	Elizabethtown, PA
G	14	Jaden Bobbett	6 ft 1 in (1.85 m)	190 lb (86 kg)	Sr	Indiana	Rye, NH
G	16	Ron Zipper	6 ft 5 in (1.96 m)	209 lb (95 kg)	Fr	Ironi Alef HS	Ashkelon, Israel

Head coach

- Matt McMahon (Appalachian State)

Assistant coach(es)

- David Patrick (Louisiana)
- Casey Long (Chattanooga)
- Jalen Courtney-Williams (Morehead State)
- Tasmin Mitchell (LSU)
- Vince Walden (Longwood)

Legend

- (C) Team captain
- (S) Suspended
- (I) Ineligible
- (W) Walk-on
- Injured
- Current redshirt

Roster

== Schedule and results ==
Date time, TV	Rank^{#}	Opponent^{#}	Result	Record	High points	High rebounds	High assists	Site (attendance) city, state
Exhibition
October 26, 2025*; 11:00 p.m., ESPN+		at UCF	W 75–68	–	16 – Thomas Jr.	11 – Sutton	9 – Thomas Jr.	Addition Financial Arena (5,409); Orlando, FL
Non-conference regular season
November 5, 2025*; 7:00 pm, SECN+		Tarleton State	W 96–60	1–0	19 – Mackinnon	8 – Nwoko	8 – Thomas Jr.	Pete Maravich Assembly Center (6,252); Baton Rouge, LA
November 10, 2025*; 7:00 pm, SECN+		New Orleans	W 93–58	2–0	22 – Nwoko	15 – Sutton	8 – Thomas Jr.	Pete Maravich Assembly Center (6,505); Baton Rouge, LA
November 13, 2025*; 7:00 pm, SECN+		FIU	W 98–81	3–0	19 – Tied	12 – Sutton	6 – Thomas Jr.	Pete Maravich Assembly Center (6,306); Baton Rouge, LA
November 18, 2025*; 7:00 pm, SECN+		Alcorn State	W 107–81	4–0	29 – Nwoko	10 – Sutton	6 – Thomas Jr.	Pete Maravich Assembly Center (6,291); Baton Rouge, LA
November 21, 2025*; 7:00 pm, SECN+		Omaha	W 99–73	5–0	22 – Mackinnon	13 – Tamba	10 – Thomas Jr.	Pete Maravich Assembly Center (6,829); Baton Rouge, LA
November 28, 2025*; 8:30 pm, CBSSN		vs. Drake; Emerald Coast Classic semifinals	W 71–62	6–0	18 – Thomas Jr.	8 – Nwoko	5 – Thomas Jr.	Raider Arena (1,800); Niceville, FL
November 29, 2025*; 6:00 pm, CBSSN		vs. DePaul; Emerald Coast Classic championship game	W 96–63	7–0	14 – Tamba	7 – Tamba	6 – Reece	Raider Arena (1,920); Niceville, FL
December 3, 2025*; 6:15 pm, ACCN		at Boston College; ACC–SEC Challenge	W 78–69 ^{OT}	8–0	23 – Jones Jr.	13 – Sutton	7 – Thomas Jr.	Conte Forum (4,060); Chestnut Hill, MA
December 7, 2025*; 2:00 pm, ESPN2		vs. No. 19 Texas Tech; Coast to Coast Challenge	L 58–82	8–1	13 – Thomas Jr.	8 – Sutton	2 – Reece	Dickies Arena (10,000); Fort Worth, TX
December 13, 2025*; 7:30 pm, SECN		vs. SMU; Compete 4 Cause Classic	W 89–77	9–1	23 – Sutton	12 – Sutton	12 – Thomas Jr.	Smoothie King Center (N/A); New Orleans, LA
December 19, 2025*; 7:00 pm, SECN+		Southeastern Louisiana	W 78–65	10–1	19 – Sutton	9 – Sutton	4 – Tied	Pete Maravich Assembly Center (7,479); Baton Rouge, LA
December 22, 2025*; 6:00 pm, SECN		Prairie View A&M	W 104–90	11–1	21 – Tied	11 – Sutton	7 – Thomas Jr.	Pete Maravich Assembly Center (8,174); Baton Rouge, LA
December 29, 2025*; 7:00 pm, SECN+		Southern Miss	W 90–62	12–1	22 – Tied	15 – Tamba	12 – Thomas Jr.	Pete Maravich Assembly Center (7,995); Baton Rouge, LA
SEC regular season
January 3, 2026; 3:00 pm, ESPNU		at Texas A&M	L 72–75	12–2 (0–1)	21 – Nwoko	11 – Tamba	7 – Reece	Reed Arena (7,520); College Station, TX
January 6, 2026; 6:00 pm, ESPNU		South Carolina	L 68–78	12–3 (0–2)	15 – Mackinnon	13 – Nwoko	6 – Reece	Pete Maravich Assembly Center (6,303); Baton Rouge, LA
January 10, 2026; 12:00 pm, SECN		at No. 11 Vanderbilt	L 73–84	12–4 (0–3)	27 – Mackinnon	7 – Nwoko	4 – Mackinnon	Memorial Gymnasium (9,399); Nashville, TN
January 14, 2026; 6:00 pm, SECN		Kentucky	L 74–75	12–5 (0–4)	16 – Tied	7 – Miller III	4 – Reece	Pete Maravich Assembly Center (8,671); Baton Rouge, LA
January 17, 2026; 2:30 pm, SECN		Missouri	W 78–70	13–5 (1–4)	26 – Sutton	8 – Nwoko	4 – King	Pete Maravich Assembly Center (7,816); Baton Rouge, LA
January 20, 2026; 6:00 pm, ESPN2		at No. 16 Florida	L 61–79	13–6 (1–5)	17 – Nwoko	7 – Sutton	3 – Tied	O'Connell Center (10,593); Gainesville, FL
January 24, 2026; 4:00 pm, SECN		at No. 20 Arkansas	L 81–85	13–7 (1–6)	17 – Nwoko	10 – Tamba	5 – Thomas Jr.	Bud Walton Arena (19,200); Fayetteville, AR
January 28, 2026; 6:00 pm, SECN		Mississippi State	L 66–80	13–8 (1–7)	15 – Mackinnon	5 – Tamba	4 – Thomas	Pete Maravich Assembly Center (7,501); Baton Rouge, LA
January 31, 2026; 12:00 pm, SECN		at South Carolina	W 92–87 ^{OT}	14–8 (2–7)	21 – Nwoko	8 – Sutton	8 – Mackinnon	Colonial Life Arena (10,738); Columbia, SC
February 7, 2025; 5:00 pm, SECN		Georgia	L 71–83	14–9 (2–8)	26 – Mackinnon	12 – Tamba	4 – Tied	Pete Maravich Assembly Center (7,270); Baton Rouge, LA
February 10, 2026; 8:00 pm, SECN		No. 21 Arkansas	L 62–91	14–10 (2–9)	18 – Sutton	8 – Nwoko	7 – Reece	Pete Maravich Assembly Center (6,701); Baton Rouge, LA
February 14, 2026; 5:00 pm, SECN		at Tennessee	L 63–73	14–11 (2–10)	15 – Tied	9 – Sutton	4 – Reece	Thompson–Boling Arena (21,678); Knoxville, TN
February 17, 2026; 8:00 pm, SECN		at Texas	L 85–88	14–12 (2–11)	21 – Sutton	5 – Tied	9 – Reece	Moody Center (10,908); Austin, TX
February 21, 2026; 5:00 pm, SECN		No. 25 Alabama	L 83–90	14–13 (2–12)	21 – Sutton	12 – Tamba	5 – Reece	Pete Maravich Assembly Center (7,105); Baton Rouge, LA
February 25, 2026; 8:00 pm, SECN		at Ole Miss	W 106–99 ^{2OT}	15–13 (3–12)	34 – Mackinnon	7 – Tamba	10 – Reece	SJB Pavilion (7,357); Oxford, MS
February 28, 2026; 5:00 pm, SECN		Oklahoma	L 67–83	15–14 (3–13)	17 – Mackinnon	10 – Tamba	8 – Reece	Pete Maravich Assembly Center (7,109); Baton Rouge, LA
March 3, 2026; 9:00 pm, SECN		at Auburn	L 74–88	15–15 (3–14)	19 – Nwoko	9 – Tamba	6 – Reece	Neville Arena (9,121); Auburn, AL
March 7, 2026; 5:00 pm, SECN		Texas A&M	L 91–94 ^{3OT}	15–16 (3–15)	20 – Mackinnon	13 – Nwoko	5 – Reece	Pete Maravich Assembly Center (6,765); Baton Rouge, LA
SEC tournament
March 11, 2026; 11:30 a.m., SECN	(16)	vs. (9) Kentucky; First round	L 82–87	15–17	28 – Mackinnon	12 – Nwoko	7 – Reece	Bridgestone Arena; Nashville, TN
*Non-conference game. ^{#}Rankings from AP Poll. (#) Tournament seedings in parentheses. All times are in Central Time.

Schedule Source:

== Rankings ==
Ranking movements Legend: ██ Increase in ranking ██ Decrease in ranking — = Not ranked RV = Received votes
	Week																				
Poll	Pre	1	2	3	4	5	6	7	8	9	10	11	12	13	14	15	16	17	18	19	Final
AP	—	—	—	—	RV	RV	RV	RV	RV	RV	—	—	—	—	—	—	—	—	—		
Coaches	—	—	—	—	RV	RV	RV	RV	RV	—	—	—	—	—	—	—	—	—	—		
