= 2025–26 Mississippi State Bulldogs men's basketball team =

American college basketball season

2025–26 Mississippi State Bulldogs men's basketball
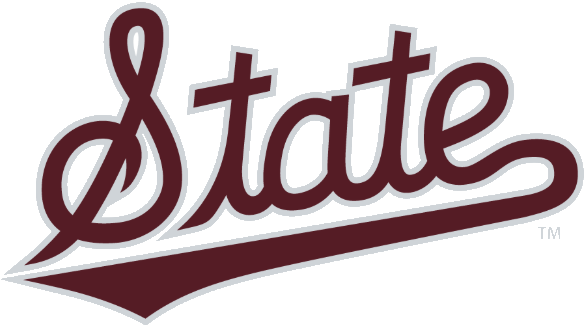
- Conference: Southeastern Conference
- Record: 13–19 (5–13 SEC)
- Head coach: Chris Jans (4th season)
- Assistant coaches: George Brooks; David Anwar; Patrice Days; Scott Padgett; Dillon Elder
- Home arena: Humphrey Coliseum

2025–26 Southeastern Conference men's basketball standings
	Conf.				Overall
Team	W		L	PCT	W		L	PCT
No. 9 Florida	16	–	2	.889	27	–	8	.771
No. 16 Alabama	13	–	5	.722	25	–	10	.714
No. 13 Arkansas †	13	–	5	.722	28	–	9	.757
No. 19 Vanderbilt	11	–	7	.611	27	–	9	.750
No. 12 Tennessee	11	–	7	.611	25	–	12	.676
Texas A&M	11	–	7	.611	22	–	12	.647
Georgia	10	–	8	.556	22	–	11	.667
Missouri	10	–	8	.556	20	–	13	.606
Kentucky	10	–	8	.556	22	–	14	.611
No. 22 Texas	9	–	9	.500	21	–	15	.583
Oklahoma	7	–	11	.389	21	–	16	.568
Auburn	7	–	11	.389	22	–	16	.579
Mississippi State	5	–	13	.278	13	–	19	.406
South Carolina	4	–	14	.222	13	–	19	.406
Ole Miss	4	–	14	.222	15	–	20	.429
LSU	3	–	15	.167	15	–	17	.469
† 2026 SEC tournament winner Rankings from AP poll

The 2025–26 Mississippi State Bulldogs men's basketball team represented Mississippi State University during the 2025–26 NCAA Division I men's basketball season. The Bulldogs, led by fourth-year head coach Chris Jans, played their home games at Humphrey Coliseum located near Starkville, Mississippi as a member of the Southeastern Conference.

== Previous season ==
The Bulldogs finished the 2024–25 season 21–13, 8–10 in SEC play to finish in a four-way tie for 9th place. They defeated LSU in the first round of the SEC tournament before losing to Missouri in the second round. They received an at-large bid to the NCAA Tournament as the 9th seed in the east, where they lost in the first round to Baylor.

== Offseason ==
=== Departures ===
All players listed as "graduated" are tentative departures unless otherwise noted.

Departures
Name	Number	Pos.	Height	Weight	Year	Hometown	Reason for departure
Claudell Harris Jr.	0	G	6'4"	200	Senior	Hahnville, Louisiana	Graduated
Kanye Clary	1	G	5'11"	190	Junior	Virginia Beach, Virginia	Transferred to Oklahoma State
Riley Kugel	2	G	6'5"	210	Junior	Orlando, Florida	Transferred to UCF
KeShawn Murphy	3	F	6'10"	230	(redshirt) Junior	Birmingham, Alabama	Transferred to Auburn
Cameron Matthews	4	F	6'7"	235	Graduate Student	Olive Branch, Mississippi	Graduated
Jeremy Foumena	7	C	6'11"	250	(redshirt) Sophomore	Montreal, Quebec	Transferred to UCF
Harrison Alexander	8	G	6'5"	190	(redshirt) Freshman	Madison, Mississippi	Transferred to SIU Edwardsville
Adrian Myers	9	F	6'6"	210	Sophomore	Stephens City, Virginia	Transferred to San Jose State
EJ Paymon	11	F	6'9"	230	Freshman	Raymond, Mississippi	Transferred to Southern Miss
Martavious Russell	21	G	6'3"	190	(redshirt) Sophomore	Coker, Alabama	Transferred to Louisiana–Monroe
RJ Meléndez	22	F	6'7"	210	Senior	Arecibo, Puerto Rico	Graduated
Michael Nwoko	23	C	6'10"	245	Sophomore	Toronto, Ontario	Transferred to LSU
Trey Jackson III	40	G	6'2"	200	(redshirt) Senior	Starkville, Mississippi	Graduated

=== Incoming transfers ===
Incoming transfers
Name	Number	Pos.	Height	Weight	Year	Hometown	Previous school
Jaborri McGhee	2	G	6'2"	200	Senior	McComb, Mississippi	UAB
Brandon Walker	4	F	6'8"	255	Senior	Oak Cliff, Texas	Montana State
Jayden Epps	10	G	6'2"	190	Senior	Norfolk, Virginia	Georgetown
Amier Ali	14	G/F	6'8"	210	Sophomore	Dallas, Texas	Arizona State
Quincy Ballard	15	C	7'0"	265	(redshirt) Senior	Syracuse, New York	Wichita State
Achor Achor	99	F	6'9"	230	(redshirt) Senior	Melbourne, Australia	Kansas State

=== Recruiting class ===
College recruiting information
Name	Hometown	School	Height	Weight	Commit date
King Grace; PG	Dallas, Texas	Waxahachie Faith Family Academy	6 ft 2 in (1.88 m)	170 lb (77 kg)	Sep 15, 2024
King Grace; PG	Recruit ratings: Rivals: 247Sports: ESPN: (83)				
Tee Bartlett; C	Los Angeles, California	Overtime Elite	6 ft 10 in (2.08 m)	270 lb (120 kg)	Nov 15, 2024
Tee Bartlett; C	Recruit ratings: Rivals: 247Sports: ESPN: (82)				
Jamarion Davis-Flemming; PF	Canton, Mississippi	Canton (MS) High School	6 ft 8 in (2.03 m)	200 lb (91 kg)	Oct 15, 2024
Jamarion Davis-Flemming; PF	Recruit ratings: Rivals: 247Sports: ESPN: (82)				
Cameren Paul; SF	Coppell, Texas	DeSoto (TX) High School	6 ft 8 in (2.03 m)	200 lb (91 kg)	Aug 21, 2024
Cameren Paul; SF	Recruit ratings: Rivals: 247Sports: ESPN: (82)				
Sergej Macura; SF	Ljubljana, Slovenia	KK Mega Basket	6 ft 8 in (2.03 m)	200 lb (91 kg)	Aug 21, 2024
Sergej Macura; SF	Recruit ratings: On3:				
Overall recruit ranking: Rivals: 19
Note: In many cases, Scout, Rivals, 247Sports, On3, and ESPN may conflict in their listings of height and weight.; In these cases, the average was taken. ESPN grades are on a 100-point scale.; Sources: "2025 Team Ranking". Rivals.

== Roster ==
2025–26 Mississippi State Bulldogs men's basketball team
Players
Coaches

Pos.	#	Name	Height	Weight	Year	Previous school	Hometown
F	0	Jamarion Davis-Flemming	6 ft 10 in (2.08 m)	240 lb (109 kg)	Fr	Canton (MS) High School	Canton, Mississippi
G	1	Dellquan Warren	6 ft 2 in (1.88 m)	185 lb (84 kg)	So	Our Saviour Lutheran School	Erie, Pennsylvania
G	2	Ja'Borri McGhee	6 ft 2 in (1.88 m)	205 lb (93 kg)	Sr	UAB	McComb, MS
C	3	Tee Bartlett	6 ft 11 in (2.11 m)	280 lb (127 kg)	Fr	Overtime Elite	Los Angeles, California
F	4	Brandon Walker	6 ft 8 in (2.03 m)	255 lb (116 kg)	Sr	Montana State	Oak Cliff, TX
G	5	Shawn Jones Jr.	6 ft 6 in (1.98 m)	205 lb (93 kg)	Sr	Shadow Creek High School	Houston, Texas
G	8	Camren Paul	6 ft 7 in (2.01 m)	210 lb (95 kg)	Fr	South Grand Prairie High School	Grand Prairie, Texas
G	10	Jayden Epps	6 ft 2 in (1.88 m)	190 lb (86 kg)	Sr	Georgetown	Norfolk, VA
F	11	Sergej Macura	6 ft 9 in (2.06 m)	220 lb (100 kg)	So	KK Mega Basket	Ljubljana, Slovenia
G	12	Josh Hubbard	6 ft 0 in (1.83 m)	190 lb (86 kg)	Jr	Madison-Ridgeland Academy	Madison, Mississippi
G/F	14	Amier Ali	6 ft 8 in (2.03 m)	210 lb (95 kg)	So	Arizona State	Dallas, Texas
C	15	Quincy Ballard	7 ft 0 in (2.13 m)	260 lb (118 kg)	RS Sr	Wichita State	Syracuse, NY
G	23	King Grace	6 ft 5 in (1.96 m)	190 lb (86 kg)	Fr	Oak Cliff Faith Family Academy	Dallas, Texas
C	34	Gai Chol	7 ft 0 in (2.13 m)	245 lb (111 kg)	Jr	Greenforest McCalep Christian Academy	Juba, South Sudan
F	99	Achor Achor	6 ft 9 in (2.06 m)	230 lb (104 kg)	RS Sr	Kansas State	Melbourne, Australia

Head coach

- Chris Jans (Loras)

Assistant coach(es)

- George Brooks (Mississippi State)
- David Anwar (Fitchburg State)
- Patrice Days (New Orleans)
- Scott Padgett (Kentucky)
- Dillon Elder (Texas A&M)

Legend

- (C) Team captain
- (S) Suspended
- (I) Ineligible
- (W) Walk-on
- Injured
- Current redshirt

Roster

== Schedule and results ==
Date time, TV	Rank^{#}	Opponent^{#}	Result	Record	High points	High rebounds	High assists	Site (attendance) city, state
Exhibition
October 26, 2025*; 6:30 p.m., ESPN+		vs. No. 2 Houston; The Preview CBB Exhibition	L 52–61	−	18 – Hubbard	7 – Achor	3 – Warren	Fort Bend Epicenter; Rosenberg, TX
Non-conference regular season
November 5, 2025*; 8:00 p.m., SECN		North Alabama	W 86–62	1–0	27 – Hubbard	12 – Macura	8 – Hubbard	Humphrey Coliseum (9,060); Starkville, MS
November 10, 2025*; 7:00 p.m., ESPNU		vs. No. 16 Iowa State	L 80–96	1–1	25 – Hubbard	8 – Achor	5 – Hubbard	Sanford Pentagon (3,426); Sioux Falls, SD
November 15, 2025*; 2:00 p.m., SECN+/ESPN+		Southeastern Louisiana	W 75–68	2–1	17 – Jones, Jr.	7 – Achor	4 – Tied	Humphrey Coliseum (7,401); Starkville, MS
November 20, 2025*; 8:30 p.m., Peacock/NBCSN		vs. Kansas State; Hall of Fame Classic semifinals	L 77–98	2–2	23 – Hubbard	9 – Achor	4 – McGhee	T-Mobile Center; Kansas City, MO
November 21, 2025*; 6:00 p.m., Peacock/NBCSN		vs. New Mexico; Hall of Fame Classic consolation	L 78–80	2–3	29 – Hubbard	8 – Ali	6 – Epps	T-Mobile Center; Kansas City, MO
November 24, 2025*; 6:30 p.m., SECN+/ESPN+		New Orleans	W 81–78 ^{OT}	3–3	28 – Hubbard	8 – Davis-Fleming	5 – Tied	Humphrey Coliseum (6,943); Starkville, MS
November 28, 2025*; 6:00 p.m., SECN+/ESPN+		SMU	L 81–87 ^{OT}	3–4	21 – Epps	12 – Achor	3 – Epps	Humphrey Coliseum (7,810); Starkville, MS
December 3, 2025*; 8:15 p.m., ACCN		at Georgia Tech; ACC-SEC Challenge	W 85–73	4–4	25 – Hubbard	7 – Tied	5 – Hubbard	McCamish Pavilion (4,859); Atlanta, GA
December 7, 2025*; 3:00 p.m., SECN		vs. San Francisco; T Town Tipoff	L 62–65	4–5	21 – Epps	7 – Jones Jr.	3 – Macura	Cadence Bank Arena; Tupelo, MS
December 13, 2025*; 9:00 p.m., ESPNU		vs. Utah; Salt Lake Showcase	W 82–74	5–5	29 – McGhee	7 – Ballard	3 – Tied	Delta Center (2,911); Salt Lake City, UT
December 16, 2025*; 6:30 p.m., SECN+/ESPN+		LIU	W 87–83	6–5	34 – Hubbard	10 – Ballard	4 – Hubbard	Humphrey Coliseum (6,186); Starkville, MS
December 20, 2025*; 3:00 p.m., ESPN		Memphis	W 71–65	7–5	19 – Epps	8 – Ballard	4 – Jones Jr.	Humphrey Coliseum (6,971); Starkville, MS
December 29, 2025*; 6:30 p.m., SECN+/ESPN+		Alabama State	W 94–56	8–5	22 – Hubbard	15 – Ballard	4 – Tied	Humphrey Coliseum (6,497); Starkville, MS
SEC regular season
January 3, 2026; 5:00 p.m., SECN		at Texas	W 101–98 ^{OT}	9–5 (1–0)	38 – Hubbard	13 – Achor	5 – Epps	Moody Center (10,823); Austin, TX
January 7, 2026; 6:00 p.m., SECN		Oklahoma	W 72–53	10–5 (2–0)	30 – Hubbard	14 – Achor	3 – Hubbard	Humphrey Coliseum (6,883); Starkville, MS
January 10, 2026; 7:30 p.m., SECN		at Kentucky	L 68–92	10–6 (2–1)	20 – Hubbard	11 – Achor	5 – Hubbard	Rupp Arena (19,725); Lexington, KY
January 13, 2026; 8:00 p.m., SECN		No. 18 Alabama	L 82–97	10–7 (2–2)	23 – Hubbard	11 – Ballard	3 – Hubbard	Humphrey Coliseum (9,212); Starkville, MS
January 17, 2026; 7:30 p.m., SECN		Ole Miss; Rivalry	L 67–68	10–8 (2–3)	14 – Epps	11 – Macura	5 – Hubbard	Humphrey Coliseum (9,212); Starkville, MS
January 21, 2026; 8:00 p.m., SECN		at Texas A&M	L 68–88	10–9 (2–4)	16 – Walker	10 – Achor	6 – Macura	Reed Arena (9,474); College Station, TX
January 24, 2026; 11:00 a.m., SECN+/ESPN+		No. 15 Vanderbilt	L 56–88	10–10 (2–5)	14 – Epps	8 – Tied	2 – Tied	Humphrey Coliseum (7,597); Starkville, MS
January 28, 2026; 6:00 p.m., SECN		at LSU	W 80–66	11–10 (3–5)	15 – Hubbard	10 – Macura	4 – Tied	Pete Maravich Assembly Center (7,501); Baton Rouge, LA
January 31, 2026; 2:30 p.m., SECN		at Missouri	L 79–82	11–11 (3–6)	23 – Epps	8 – Davis-Fleming	4 – Epps	Mizzou Arena (12,527); Columbia, MO
February 7, 2025; 11:00 a.m., ESPN2		No. 21 Arkansas	L 68–88	11–12 (3–7)	16 – Hubbard	8 – Achor	5 – Hubbard	Humphrey Coliseum (8,254); Starkville, MS
February 11, 2025; 8:00 p.m., ESPN2		Tennessee	L 64–73	11–13 (3–8)	31 – Hubbard	8 – Macura	5 – Epps	Humphrey Coliseum (7,986); Starkville, MS
February 14, 2026; 5:30 p.m., ESPN2		at Ole Miss; Rivalry	W 90–78	12–13 (4–8)	32 – Hubbard	8 – Jones, Jr.	6 – Hubbard	SJB Pavilion (8,476); Oxford, MS
February 18, 2026; 8:00 p.m., ESPN2		Auburn	W 91–85	13–13 (5–8)	46 – Hubbard	9 – Hubbard	5 – Jones, Jr.	Humphrey Coliseum (7,789); Starkville, MS
February 21, 2026; 12:00 p.m., SECN		at South Carolina	L 89–97	13–14 (5–9)	15 – Ballard	10 – Ballard	7 – McGhee	Colonial Life Arena (10,265); Columbia, SC
February 25, 2026; 8:00 p.m., ESPN		at No. 17 Alabama	L 75–100	13–15 (5–10)	18 – Achor	10 – Davis-Fleming	4 – Tied	Coleman Coliseum (13,474); Tuscaloosa, AL
February 28, 2025; 12:00 p.m., SECN		Missouri	L 64–88	13–16 (5–11)	16 – Hubbard	6 – Ballard	3 – Epps	Humphrey Coliseum (7,012); Starkville, MS
March 3, 2026; 7:00 p.m., SECN		at No. 5 Florida	L 74–108	13–17 (5–12)	21 – Hubbard	5 – Tied	5 – Hubbard	O'Connell Center (10,967); Gainesville, FL
March 7, 2026; 2:30 p.m., SECN		Georgia	L 96–102	13–18 (5–13)	42 – Hubbard	6 – Tied	6 – Tied	Humphrey Coliseum (6,670); Starkville, MS
SEC Tournament
March 11, 2026; 2:00 p.m., SECN	(13)	vs. (12) Auburn; First Round	L 61–79	13–19	22 – Hubbard	8 – Tied	3 – Hubbard	Bridgestone Arena (12,722); Nashville, TN
*Non-conference game. ^{#}Rankings from AP Poll. (#) Tournament seedings in parentheses. All times are in Central Time.
