= 2025–26 Texas A&M Aggies men's basketball team =

American college basketball season

2025–26 Texas A&M Aggies men's basketball

NCAA tournament, Second round
- Conference: Southeastern Conference
- Record: 22–12 (11–7 SEC)
- Head coach: Bucky McMillan (1st season)
- Associate head coach: Mitch Cole (1st season)
- Assistant coaches: Kyle Keller (1st season); Frank Haith (1st season); T.J. Cleveland (1st season); Dave Good (1st season)
- Home arena: Reed Arena

2025–26 Southeastern Conference men's basketball standings
	Conf.				Overall
Team	W		L	PCT	W		L	PCT
No. 9 Florida	16	–	2	.889	27	–	8	.771
No. 16 Alabama	13	–	5	.722	25	–	10	.714
No. 13 Arkansas †	13	–	5	.722	28	–	9	.757
No. 19 Vanderbilt	11	–	7	.611	27	–	9	.750
No. 12 Tennessee	11	–	7	.611	25	–	12	.676
Texas A&M	11	–	7	.611	22	–	12	.647
Georgia	10	–	8	.556	22	–	11	.667
Missouri	10	–	8	.556	20	–	13	.606
Kentucky	10	–	8	.556	22	–	14	.611
No. 22 Texas	9	–	9	.500	21	–	15	.583
Oklahoma	7	–	11	.389	21	–	16	.568
Auburn	7	–	11	.389	22	–	16	.579
Mississippi State	5	–	13	.278	13	–	19	.406
South Carolina	4	–	14	.222	13	–	19	.406
Ole Miss	4	–	14	.222	15	–	20	.429
LSU	3	–	15	.167	15	–	17	.469
† 2026 SEC tournament winner Rankings from AP poll

The 2025–26 Texas A&M Aggies men's basketball team represented Texas A&M University during the 2025–26 NCAA Division I men's basketball season. The team was led by first-year head coach Bucky McMillan and played their home games at Reed Arena located in College Station, Texas as a member of the Southeastern Conference.

== Previous season ==
The Aggies finished the 2024–25 season 23–11, 11–7 in SEC play to finish in fifth place. In the SEC tournament. They were upset in their very first game in the second round by rival Texas in double-overtime. The Aggies received an at-large bid to the NCAA Tournament as a No. 4 seed in the South Region, where they defeated Yale in the first round before falling to Michigan in the second round.

Following the season, on April 1, 2025, then-head coach Buzz Williams left the team to become the head coach at Maryland. Three days later, on April 4, 2025, the school named Samford head coach Bucky McMillan the team's new head coach.

== Roster ==
2025–26 Texas A&M Aggies men's basketball team
Players
Coaches

Pos.	#	Name	Height	Weight	Year	Previous school	Hometown
G	0	Marcus Hill	6 ft 3 in (1.91 m)	192 lb (87 kg)	GS	NC State	Rockford, IL
G	1	Josh Holloway	6 ft 1 in (1.85 m)	178 lb (81 kg)	Jr	Samford	Memphis, TN
G	2	Pop Isaacs	6 ft 2 in (1.88 m)	182 lb (83 kg)	Jr	Creighton	Las Vegas, NV
G	3	Rylan Griffen	6 ft 5 in (1.96 m)	181 lb (82 kg)	Sr	Kansas	Dallas, TX
F	4	Jamie Vinson	6 ft 11 in (2.11 m)	245 lb (111 kg)	So	Texas	Austin, TX
G	5	Jacari Lane	6 ft 0 in (1.83 m)	178 lb (81 kg)	Sr	North Alabama	Huntsville, AL
G	6	Ali Dibba	6 ft 5 in (1.96 m)	210 lb (95 kg)	Sr	Southern Illinois	Stockholm, Sweden
F	7	Zach Clemence	6 ft 11 in (2.11 m)	232 lb (105 kg)	GS	Kansas	San Antonio, TX
G	8	Noah Shelby	6 ft 3 in (1.91 m)	190 lb (86 kg)	Jr	Kansas	McKinney, TX
G	9	Rubén Domínguez	6 ft 6 in (1.98 m)	213 lb (97 kg)	So	Unknown	Puerto Real, Spain
G	10	Jeremiah Green	6 ft 3 in (1.91 m)	189 lb (86 kg)	Fr	Compass Prep (Arizona)	Denton, TX
F	12	Rashaun Agee	6 ft 8 in (2.03 m)	231 lb (105 kg)	GS	USC	Chicago, IL
F	14	Chris McDermott	6 ft 7 in (2.01 m)	228 lb (103 kg)	So	Booker T. Washington	Houston, TX
F	21	Mackenzie Mgbako (injured)	6 ft 9 in (2.06 m)	225 lb (102 kg)	Jr	Indiana	Franklin, NJ
F	33	Federiko Federiko	6 ft 11 in (2.11 m)	226 lb (103 kg)	GS	Texas Tech	Helsinki, Finland

Head coach

- Bucky McMillan (Birmingham–Southern)

Assistant coach(es)

- Mitch Cole (Montana State Billings)
- Kyle Keller (Oklahoma State)
- Frank Haith (Elon)
- T.J. Cleveland (Arkansas)
- Dave Good (Central Michigan)

Legend

- (C) Team captain
- (S) Suspended
- (I) Ineligible
- (W) Walk-on
- Injured
- Current redshirt

Roster
Last update: January 24, 2026

== Schedule and results ==
Date time, TV	Rank^{#}	Opponent^{#}	Result	Record	High points	High rebounds	High assists	Site (attendance) city, state
Exhibition
October 26, 2025*; 4:00 p.m., ESPN+		vs. Arizona State; The Preview College Basketball Exhibition	W 95–88	–	20 – Clemence	8 – Agee	9 – Holloway	Fort Bend Epicenter; Rosenberg, TX
Non-conference regular season
November 3, 2025*; 7:00 p.m., SECN+		Northwestern State	W 98–68	1–0	18 – Domínguez	8 – Federiko	4 – Tied	Reed Arena (7,517); College Station, TX
November 6, 2025*; 7:00 p.m., SECN+		Texas Southern	W 104–70	2–0	16 – Agee	6 – Federiko	5 – Griffen	Reed Arena (6,821); College Station, TX
November 9, 2025*; 1:00 p.m., ESPN2		at Oklahoma State	L 63–87	2–1	14 – Hill	7 – Agee	4 – Domínguez	Gallagher-Iba Arena (7,501); Stillwater, OK
November 14, 2025*; 7:00 p.m., SECN+		UCF	L 74–86	2–2	14 – Hill	8 – Agee	4 – Griffen	Reed Arena (9,099); College Station, TX
November 18, 2025*; 7:00 p.m., SECN+		Montana	W 86–81	3–2	17 – Griffen	10 – Agee	5 – Holloway	Reed Arena (6,304); College Station, TX
November 21, 2025*; 7:00 p.m., SECN+		Manhattan	W 109–68	4–2	30 – Dominguez	10 – Agee	7 – Lane	Reed Arena (7,545); College Station, TX
November 25, 2025*; 7:00 p.m., SECN+		Mississippi Valley State	W 120–84	5–2	19 – Mgbako	6 – Vinson	5 – Lane	Reed Arena (6,426); College Station, TX
November 28, 2025*; 4:00 p.m., ESPN2		vs. Florida State; Battle in the Bay	W 95–59	6–2	21 – Dominguez	17 – Agee	5 – Hill	Benchmark International Arena (4,598); Tampa, FL
December 2, 2025*; 6:00 pm, ESPNU		at Pittsburgh; ACC–SEC Challenge	W 81–73	7–2	21 – Agee	13 – Agee	5 – Lane	Petersen Events Center (4,945); Pittsburgh, PA
December 7, 2025*; 4:00 p.m., ESPN2		vs. SMU; Hoop Hype XL College Basketball Showcase	L 80–93 ^{OT}	7–3	25 – Hill	11 – Agee	5 – Tied	College Park Center (2,800); Arlington, TX
December 14, 2025*; 6:00 p.m., SECN		Jacksonville	W 112–75	8–3	19 – Griffen	8 – Mgbako	5 – Tied	Reed Arena (6,250); College Station, TX
December 21, 2025*; 3:00 p.m., SECN+		East Texas A&M	W 118–77	9–3	21 – Agee	9 – Mgbako	6 – Tied	Reed Arena (4,495); College Station, TX
December 29, 2025*; 7:00 p.m., SECN+		Prairie View A&M	W 111–82	10–3	19 – Agee	13 – Agee	5 – Griffen	Reed Arena (7,797); College Station, TX
SEC regular season
January 3, 2026; 3:00 p.m., SECN+		LSU	W 75–72	11–3 (1–0)	15 – Agee	11 – Agee	4 – Isaacs	Reed Arena (7,570); College Station, TX
January 6, 2026; 8:00 p.m., SECN		at Auburn	W 90–88	12–3 (2–0)	21 – Isaacs	7 – Agee	5 – Isaacs	Neville Arena (9,121); Auburn, AL
January 10, 2026; 2:30 p.m., SECN		Oklahoma	W 83–76	13–3 (3–0)	16 – Agee	12 – Agee	5 – Lane	Reed Arena (9,096); College Station, TX
January 13, 2026; 6:00 p.m., SECN		at No. 24 Tennessee	L 82–87 ^{2OT}	13–4 (3–1)	20 – Lane	9 – Agee	9 – Lane	Thompson-Boling Arena (17,808); Knoxville, TN
January 17, 2026; 5:00 p.m., ESPN		at Texas; Lone Star Showdown	W 74–70	14–4 (4–1)	17 – Tied	11 – Agee	3 – Tied	Moody Center (11,422); Austin, TX
January 21, 2026; 8:00 p.m., SECN		Mississippi State	W 88–68	15–4 (5–1)	23 – Agee	10 – Agee	6 – Lane	Reed Arena (9,474); College Station, TX
January 24, 2026; 12:00 p.m., SECN+		South Carolina	W 92–69	16–4 (6–1)	21 – Clemence	7 – Agee	7 – Lane	Reed Arena (10,357); College Station, TX
January 31, 2026; 12:00 p.m., SECN		at Georgia	W 92–77	17–4 (7–1)	18 – Agee	15 – Agee	7 – Agee	Stegeman Coliseum (10,195); Athens, GA
February 4, 2026; 6:00 p.m., SECN		at Alabama	L 97–100	17–5 (7–2)	21 – Agee	6 – Tied	5 – Lane	Coleman Coliseum (13,474); Tuscaloosa, AL
February 7, 2026; 7:30 p.m., SECN		No. 17 Florida	L 67–86	17–6 (7–3)	17 – Tied	11 – Agee	5 – Agee	Reed Arena (12,831); College Station, TX
February 11, 2026; 8:00 p.m., SECN		Missouri	L 85–86	17–7 (7–4)	20 – Clemence	9 – Agee	4 – Agee	Reed Arena (7,749); College Station, TX
February 14, 2026; 12:00 p.m., SECN		at No. 19 Vanderbilt	L 69–82	17–8 (7–5)	20 – Hill	11 – Agee	4 – Griffen	Memorial Gymnasium (9,121); Nashville, TN
February 18, 2026; 6:00 p.m., SECN		Ole Miss	W 80–77	18–8 (8–5)	17 – Agee	10 – Agee	5 – Tied	Reed Arena (8,594); College Station, TX
February 21, 2026; 7:30 p.m., SECN		at Oklahoma	W 75–71	19–8 (9–5)	18 – Agee	7 – Agee	4 – Clemence	Lloyd Noble Center (8,265); Norman, OK
February 25, 2026; 8:00 p.m., ESPN2		at No. 20 Arkansas	L 84–99	19–9 (9–6)	29 – Clemence	7 – Agee	5 – Griffen	Bud Walton Arena (19,200); Fayetteville, AR
February 28, 2026; 3:00 p.m., ESPN2		Texas; Lone Star Showdown	L 70–76	19–10 (9–7)	22 – Agee	8 – Tied	4 – Isaacs	Reed Arena (12,107); College Station, TX
March 3, 2026; 6:00 p.m., ESPN2		Kentucky	W 96–85	20–10 (10–7)	21 – Griffen	8 – Agee	8 – Isaacs	Reed Arena (8,062); College Station, TX
March 7, 2026; 5:00 p.m., SECN		at LSU	W 94–91 ^{3OT}	21–10 (11–7)	26 – Agee	12 – Clemence	3 – Tied	Pete Maravich Assembly Center (6,765); Baton Rouge, LA
SEC Tournament
March 12, 2026; 8:30 p.m., SECN	(6)	vs. (11) Oklahoma; Second round	L 63–83	21–11	13 – Griffen	10 – Agee	3 – Isaacs	Bridgestone Arena (11,457); Nashville, TN
NCAA Tournament
March 19, 2026*; 6:35 p.m., truTV	(10 S)	vs. (7 S) No. 22 Saint Mary's; First round	W 63–50	22–11	22 – Agee	9 – Agee	3 – Tied	Paycom Center (13,815); Oklahoma City, OK
March 21, 2026*; 5:10 p.m., TNT	(10 S)	vs. (2 S) No. 5 Houston; Second round	L 57–88	22–12	12 – Holloway	6 – Vinson	3 – Holloway	Paycom Center (14,887); Oklahoma City, OK
*Non-conference game. ^{#}Rankings from AP Poll. (#) Tournament seedings in parentheses. S=South. All times are in Central Time.

== Rankings ==
Ranking movements Legend: ██ Increase in ranking ██ Decrease in ranking — = Not ranked RV = Received votes
	Week																				
Poll	Pre	1	2	3	4	5	6	7	8	9	10	11	12	13	14	15	16	17	18	19	Final
AP	—	—	—	—	—	—	—	—	—	—	RV	RV	RV	RV	RV	—	RV	—	—	—	RV
Coaches	—	—	—	—	—	—	—	—	—	—	RV	RV	RV	25	RV	—	—	—	—	—	—
