= 2025–26 South Carolina Gamecocks men's basketball team =

American men's college basketball team

2025–26 South Carolina Gamecocks men's basketball
- Conference: Southeastern Conference
- Record: 13–19 (4–14 SEC)
- Head coach: Lamont Paris (4th season)
- Assistant coaches: Tanner Bronson; Eddie Shannon; Will Bailey; David McKinley
- Home arena: Colonial Life Arena

2025–26 Southeastern Conference men's basketball standings
	Conf.				Overall
Team	W		L	PCT	W		L	PCT
No. 9 Florida	16	–	2	.889	27	–	8	.771
No. 16 Alabama	13	–	5	.722	25	–	10	.714
No. 13 Arkansas †	13	–	5	.722	28	–	9	.757
No. 19 Vanderbilt	11	–	7	.611	27	–	9	.750
No. 12 Tennessee	11	–	7	.611	25	–	12	.676
Texas A&M	11	–	7	.611	22	–	12	.647
Georgia	10	–	8	.556	22	–	11	.667
Missouri	10	–	8	.556	20	–	13	.606
Kentucky	10	–	8	.556	22	–	14	.611
No. 22 Texas	9	–	9	.500	21	–	15	.583
Oklahoma	7	–	11	.389	21	–	16	.568
Auburn	7	–	11	.389	22	–	16	.579
Mississippi State	5	–	13	.278	13	–	19	.406
South Carolina	4	–	14	.222	13	–	19	.406
Ole Miss	4	–	14	.222	15	–	20	.429
LSU	3	–	15	.167	15	–	17	.469
† 2026 SEC tournament winner Rankings from AP poll

The 2025–26 South Carolina Gamecocks men's basketball team represented the University of South Carolina during the 2025–26 NCAA Division I men's basketball season. The team was led by fourth-year head coach Lamont Paris and played their home games at Colonial Life Arena located in Columbia, South Carolina as a member of the Southeastern Conference (SEC).

== Previous season ==
The Gamecocks finished the 2024–25 season 12–20, 2–16 in SEC play, placing them last in the conference. They lost to Arkansas in the first round of the SEC tournament.

== Roster ==
2025–26 South Carolina Gamecocks men's basketball team
Players
Coaches

Pos.	#	Name	Height	Weight	Year	Previous school	Hometown
F	0	Jordan Butler	7 ft 0 in (2.13 m)	237 lb (108 kg)	Sr	Christ Church; Missouri	Greenville, SC
F	2	Christ Essandoko	7 ft 0 in (2.13 m)	280 lb (127 kg)	Jr	Winston–Salem CA; Providence	Clichy, France
G	4	Kobe Knox	6 ft 5 in (1.96 m)	200 lb (91 kg)	Sr	Tampa Catholic HS; South Florida	Tampa, FL
G	5	Meechie Johnson	6 ft 2 in (1.88 m)	192 lb (87 kg)	Sr	Garfield Heights HS; Ohio State	Cleveland, OH
F	6	EJ Walker	6 ft 7 in (2.01 m)	253 lb (115 kg)	Fr	Lloyd Memorial HS	Florence, KY
G	7	Abu Yarmah	6 ft 6 in (1.98 m)	209 lb (95 kg)	Fr	Moravian Prep	Roanoke, VA
G	10	Myles Stute	6 ft 7 in (2.01 m)	221 lb (100 kg)		Gonzaga College HS; Vanderbilt	Washington, DC
G	13	Grant Polk	6 ft 6 in (1.98 m)	197 lb (89 kg)	Fr	St. Albans	Gainesville, VA
G	14	Eli Sparkman	6 ft 0 in (1.83 m)	160 lb (73 kg)	Sr	Baylor School	Cleveland, TN
G	15	Eli Ellis	6 ft 0 in (1.83 m)	192 lb (87 kg)	Fr	Moravian Prep	Hickory, NC
F	20	Hayden Assemian	6 ft 6 in (1.98 m)	230 lb (104 kg)	Fr	Moravian Prep	Greenville, SC
G	23	Cam Scott	6 ft 6 in (1.98 m)	172 lb (78 kg)	So	Lexington HS	Lexington, SC
F	24	Nordin Kapic	6 ft 8 in (2.03 m)	240 lb (109 kg)	Sr	UC San Diego	Vienna, Austria
F	31	Elijah Strong	6 ft 8 in (2.03 m)	250 lb (113 kg)	Sr	Myers Park HS; Boston College	Charlotte, NC
G	55	Mike Sharavjamts	6 ft 9 in (2.06 m)	195 lb (88 kg)	Sr	Int'l Sports Academy; Utah	Ulaanbaatar, Mongolia

Head coach

- Lamont Paris (Wooster)

Assistant coach(es)

- Tanner Bronson (Wisconsin)
- Eddie Shannon (Florida)
- Will Bailey (UAB)
- David McKinley (Ohio)

Legend

- (C) Team captain
- (S) Suspended
- (I) Ineligible
- (W) Walk-on
- Injured
- Current redshirt

Roster
Last update: November 14, 2025

== Schedule ==
Date time, TV	Rank^{#}	Opponent^{#}	Result	Record	High points	High rebounds	High assists	Site (attendance) city, state
Exhibition
October 26, 2025*; 7:00 p.m.		at NC State	L 86–88	–	23 – Ellis	5 – Tied	4 – Johnson	Lenovo Center (8,000); Raleigh, NC
Non-conference regular season
November 4, 2025*; 7:00 p.m., SECN+		North Carolina A&T	W 91–72	1–0	14 – Johnson	5 – Tied	5 – Ellis	Colonial Life Arena (12,344); Columbia, SC
November 9, 2025*; 6:30 p.m., SECN		Southern Miss	W 83–79	2–0	33 – Johnson	7 – Ellis	5 – Knox	Colonial Life Arena (11,420); Columbia, SC
November 12, 2025*; 7:00 p.m., SECN+		Presbyterian	W 81–61	3–0	13 – Sharavjamts	8 – Assemian	4 – Ellis	Colonial Life Arena (11,874); Columbia, SC
November 18, 2025*; 7:00 p.m., SECN+		Radford	W 87–58	4–0	15 – Strong	10 – Sharavjamts	5 – Tied	Colonial Life Arena (11,623); Columbia, SC
November 21, 2025*; 2:00 p.m., CBSSN		vs. Butler; Greenbrier Tip-Off	L 72–79	4–1	24 – Johnson	6 – Sharavjamts	4 – Knox	The Greenbrier (1,209); White Sulphur Springs, WV
November 23, 2025*; 5:00 p.m., CBSSN		vs. Northwestern; Greenbrier Tip-Off	L 77–79	4–2	16 – Strong	8 – Sharavjamts	5 – Johnson	The Greenbrier (782); White Sulphur Springs, WV
November 28, 2025*; 4:00 p.m., SECN+		Charleston Southern	W 74–62	5–2	22 – Strong	9 – Ellis	7 – Sharavjamts	Colonial Life Arena (9,789); Columbia, SC
December 2, 2025*; 7:00 p.m., SECN		Virginia Tech; ACC–SEC Challenge	L 83–86 ^{OT}	5–3	18 – Johnson	6 – Johnson	4 – Knox	Colonial Life Arena (11,420); Columbia, SC
December 6, 2025*; 2:00 p.m., SECN+		Stetson	W 82–51	6–3	17 – Johnson	7 – Sharavjamts	4 – Tied	Colonial Life Arena (9,055); Columbia, SC
December 13, 2025*; 7:00 p.m., SECN+		The Citadel	W 71–55	7–3	19 – Johnson	7 – Sharavjamts	3 – Tied	Colonial Life Arena (10,199); Columbia, SC
December 16, 2025*; 7:00 p.m., ESPN2		at Clemson; Palmetto Series	L 61–68	7–4	13 – Sharavjamts	7 – Sharavjamts	4 – Johnson	Littlejohn Coliseum (9,000); Clemson, SC
December 22, 2025*; 4:00 p.m., SECN+		South Carolina State	W 95–70	8–4	15 – Tied	7 – Stute	5 – Tied	Colonial Life Arena (10,171); Columbia, SC
December 30, 2025*; 6:00 p.m., SECN		Albany	W 96–67	9–4	15 – Johnson	5 – Assemian	7 – Sharavjamts	Colonial Life Arena (9,501); Columbia, SC
SEC regular season
January 3, 2026; 2:00 p.m., ESPNU		No. 11 Vanderbilt	L 71–83	9–5 (0–1)	17 – Strong	6 – Stute	6 – Johnson	Colonial Life Arena (9,760); Columbia, SC
January 6, 2026; 7:00 p.m., ESPNU		at LSU	W 78–68	10–5 (1–1)	30 – Strong	7 – Sharavjamts	6 – Johnson	Pete Maravich Center (6,303); Baton Rouge, LA
January 10, 2026; 2:00 p.m., ESPN2		No. 18 Georgia	L 70–75	10–6 (1–2)	18 – Sharavjamts	10 – Knox	5 – Johnson	Colonial Life Arena (11,091); Columbia, SC
January 14, 2026; 9:00 p.m., SECN		at No. 17 Arkansas	L 74–108	10–7 (1–3)	29 – Johnson	6 – Sharavjamts	6 – Johnson	Bud Walton Arena (19,200); Fayetteville, AR
January 17, 2026; 6:00 p.m., SECN		at Auburn	L 67–71	10–8 (1–4)	17 – Johnson	9 – Tied	6 – Johnson	Neville Arena (9,121); Auburn, AL
January 20, 2026; 7:00 p.m., SECN		Oklahoma	W 85–76	11–8 (2–4)	20 – Johnson	7 – Knox	5 – Sharajamts	Colonial Life Arena (10,861); Columbia, SC
January 24, 2026; 1:00 p.m., SECN+		at Texas A&M	L 69–92	11–9 (2–5)	26 – Johnson	5 – Tied	5 – Johnson	Reed Arena (10,357); College Station, TX
January 28, 2026; 9:00 p.m., SECN		No. 19 Florida	L 48–95	11–10 (2–6)	13 – Ellis	6 – Walker	2 – Johnson	Colonial Life Arena (12,686); Columbia, SC
January 31, 2026; 1:00 p.m., SECN		LSU	L 87–92 ^{OT}	11–11 (2–7)	21 – Johnson	6 – Sharavjamts	6 – Johnson	Colonial Life Arena (10,738); Columbia, SC
February 3, 2026; 7:00 p.m., SECN		at Texas	L 75–84	11–12 (2–8)	35 – Johnson	7 – Knox	6 – Johnson	Moody Center (10,286); Austin, TX
February 7, 2026; 1:00 p.m., SECN		Missouri	L 59–78	11–13 (2–9)	13 – Johnson	6 – Ellis	3 – Sharavjamts	Colonial Life Arena (10,505); Columbia, SC
February 14, 2026; 8:30 p.m., SECN		at Alabama	L 75–89	11–14 (2–10)	26 – Johnson	8 – Sharavjamts	6 – Knox	Coleman Coliseum (13,474); Tuscaloosa, AL
February 17, 2026; 7:00 p.m., SECN		at No. 12 Florida	L 62–76	11–15 (2–11)	22 – Johnson	6 – Sharavjamts	3 – Ellis	O'Connell Center (10,622); Gainesville, FL
February 21, 2026; 1:00 p.m., SECN		Mississippi State	W 97–89	12–15 (3–11)	21 – Tied	5 – Tied	9 – Johnson	Colonial Life Arena (10,265); Columbia, SC
February 24, 2026; 7:00 p.m., SECN		Kentucky	L 63–72	12–16 (3–12)	18 – Johnson	5 – Sharavjamts	6 – Johnson	Colonial Life Arena (11,318); Columbia, SC
February 28, 2026; 3:30 p.m., SECN		at Georgia	L 68–87	12–17 (3–13)	20 – Johnson	7 – Sharavjamts	4 – Johnson	Stegeman Coliseum (10,523); Athens, GA
March 3, 2026; 6:00 p.m., SECN		No. 23 Tennessee	L 59–78	12–18 (3–14)	20 – Johnson	4 – Tied	4 – Johnson	Colonial Life Arena (10,517); Columbia, SC
March 7, 2026; 1:00 p.m., SECN		at Ole Miss	W 64–61	13–18 (4–14)	17 – Johnson	9 – Sharavjamts	7 – Ellis	SJB Pavilion (7,543); Oxford, MS
SEC Tournament
March 11, 2025; 8:30 p.m., SECN	(14)	vs. (11) Oklahoma; First round	L 74–86	13–19	20 – Knox	8 – Sharavjamts	5 – Knox	Bridgestone Arena (10,701); Nashville, TN
*Non-conference game. ^{#}Rankings from AP Poll. (#) Tournament seedings in parentheses. All times are in Eastern Time.
