= 2025–26 Missouri Tigers men's basketball team =

US college team

2025–26 Missouri Tigers men's basketball

NCAA tournament, First round
- Conference: Southeastern Conference
- Record: 20–13 (10–8 SEC)
- Head coach: Dennis Gates (4th season)
- Associate head coach: Kyle Smithpeters (4th season)
- Assistant coaches: Ryan Sharbaugh (3rd season); Matt Cline (3rd season); Steve Wright (1st season); Dickey Nutt (4th season)
- Home arena: Mizzou Arena

2025–26 Southeastern Conference men's basketball standings
	Conf.				Overall
Team	W		L	PCT	W		L	PCT
No. 9 Florida	16	–	2	.889	27	–	8	.771
No. 16 Alabama	13	–	5	.722	25	–	10	.714
No. 13 Arkansas †	13	–	5	.722	28	–	9	.757
No. 19 Vanderbilt	11	–	7	.611	27	–	9	.750
No. 12 Tennessee	11	–	7	.611	25	–	12	.676
Texas A&M	11	–	7	.611	22	–	12	.647
Georgia	10	–	8	.556	22	–	11	.667
Missouri	10	–	8	.556	20	–	13	.606
Kentucky	10	–	8	.556	22	–	14	.611
No. 22 Texas	9	–	9	.500	21	–	15	.583
Oklahoma	7	–	11	.389	21	–	16	.568
Auburn	7	–	11	.389	22	–	16	.579
Mississippi State	5	–	13	.278	13	–	19	.406
South Carolina	4	–	14	.222	13	–	19	.406
Ole Miss	4	–	14	.222	15	–	20	.429
LSU	3	–	15	.167	15	–	17	.469
† 2026 SEC tournament winner Rankings from AP poll

The 2025–26 Missouri Tigers men's basketball team represented the University of Missouri in the 2025–26 NCAA Division I men's basketball season and was led by fourth-year head coach Dennis Gates. The team played its home games at Mizzou Arena in Columbia, Missouri, as a fourteenth-year member of the Southeastern Conference.

== Previous season ==
The Tigers finished the season 22–12, 10–8 in SEC play to finish in a three-way tie for sixth place. As the No. 7 seed in the SEC Tournament, held at Bridgestone Arena in Nashville, Tennessee, they defeated Mississippi State, 85–73, in the second round before losing in the quarterfinals to Florida, 95–81. They received an at-large bid to the NCAA Tournament as a No. 6 seed in the West region, where they were upset in the first round by Drake, 67–57.

=== Departures ===
Missouri departures
Name	Number	Pos.	Height	Weight	Year	Hometown	Reason for departure
Marques Warrick	1	G	6'3"	190	Graduate student	Lexington, KY	Graduated
Tamar Bates	2	G	6'5"	195	Senior	Kansas City, KS	Graduated/undrafted in 2025 NBA draft; signed with the Denver Nuggets
Marcus Allen	4	G/F	6'7"	220	Freshman	Miami, FL	Transferred to Miami
Jeremy Sanchez	10	G	6'0"	180	Graduate student	North Ridgeville, OH	Walk-on; graduated
Tony Perkins	12	G	6'4"	200	Graduate student	Indianapolis, IN	Graduated
Danny Stephens	15	G/F	6'7"	230	(redshirt) Freshman	Augusta, IL	Walk-on; transferred to Western Illinois
JV Brown	17	G	6'5"	200	(redshirt) Freshman	San Pedro, CA	Walk-on; transferred to Westmont
Peyton Marshall	21	C	7'0"	300	Freshman	Marietta, GA	Transferred to Georgia Tech
Aidan Shaw	23	G/F	6'9"	210	Junior	Stillwell, KS	Transferred to Boston College
Caleb Grill	31	G	6'3"	205	Graduate student	Maize, KS	Graduated
Josh Gray	33	C	7'0"	260	Graduate student	Brooklyn, NY	Graduated

=== Incoming transfers ===
Missouri incoming transfers
Name	Number	Pos.	Height	Weight	Year	Hometown	Previous school
Sebastian Mack	12	G	6'3"	200	Junior	Chicago, IL	Transfer from UCLA
Jevon Porter	14	F	6'11"	225	Senior	Columbia, MO	Transfer from LMU
Shawn Phillips	15	C	7'0"	245	Senior	Dayton, OH	Transfer from Arizona State
Jayden Stone	17	G	6'4"	185	Graduate Student	Perth, Australia	Transfer from West Virginia
Luke Northweather	45	C	6'11"	240	(redshirt) Junior	Jefferson City, MO	Transfer from Oklahoma

==== 2025 recruiting class ====
College recruiting
Name	Hometown	School	Height	Weight	Commit date
Nicholas Randall #12 C	St. Louis, MO	AZ Compass Prep	6 ft 8 in (2.03 m)	220 lb (100 kg)	Oct 28, 2024
Nicholas Randall #12 C	Recruit ratings: Rivals: 247Sports: ESPN: (83)				
Aaron Rowe; G	Columbia, MO	Tolton High School	6 ft 0 in (1.83 m)	160 lb (73 kg)	Dec 12, 2023
Aaron Rowe; G	Recruit ratings: Rivals: 247Sports: ESPN: (82)				
Overall recruit ranking: Scout: 10 Rivals: 5
Note: In many cases, Scout, Rivals, 247Sports, On3, and ESPN may conflict in their listings of height and weight.; In these cases, the average was taken. ESPN grades are on a 100-point scale.; Sources:

== Roster ==
2025–26 Missouri Tigers men's basketball team
Players
Coaches

Pos.	#	Name	Height	Weight	Year	Previous school	Hometown
G	0	Anthony Robinson II	6 ft 3 in (1.91 m)	180 lb (82 kg)	Jr	FSUS	Tallahassee, FL
G	1	Aaron Rowe	6 ft 2 in (1.88 m)	155 lb (70 kg)	Fr	Tolton Catholic High School	Columbia, MO
G	5	T.O. Barrett	6 ft 4 in (1.93 m)	200 lb (91 kg)	So	Link Academy	Edmond, OK
G	6	Annor Boateng	6 ft 6 in (1.98 m)	215 lb (98 kg)	So	Little Rock Central High School	Little Rock, AR
C	7	Trent Burns	7 ft 5 in (2.26 m)	235 lb (107 kg)	RS Fr	Pro-Vision Academy	Houston, TX
G/F	11	Trent Pierce	6 ft 10 in (2.08 m)	220 lb (100 kg)	Jr	Compass Prep	Tulsa, OK
G	12	Sebastian Mack	6 ft 3 in (1.91 m)	195 lb (88 kg)	Jr	Coronado High School; UCLA	Chicago, IL
F	14	Jevon Porter	6 ft 11 in (2.11 m)	230 lb (104 kg)	Sr	Tolton Catholic High School; Loyola Marymount	Columbia, MO
C	15	Shawn Phillips	7 ft 0 in (2.13 m)	245 lb (111 kg)	Sr	Arizona State	Dayton, Ohio
G	17	Jayden Stone	6 ft 4 in (1.93 m)	185 lb (84 kg)	GS	West Virginia	Perth, Australia
G/F	24	Nicholas Randall	6 ft 9 in (2.06 m)	240 lb (109 kg)	Fr	Compass Prep	St. Louis, MO
G/F	25	Mark Mitchell	6 ft 9 in (2.06 m)	230 lb (104 kg)	Sr	Duke	Kansas City, KS
G/F	35	Jacob Crews	6 ft 8 in (2.03 m)	210 lb (95 kg)	GS	UT Martin	Hilliard, FL
F	45	Luke Northweather	6 ft 11 in (2.11 m)	235 lb (107 kg)	RS Jr	Blair Oaks High School; Oklahoma	Jefferson City, MO

Head coach

- Dennis Gates (California)

Assistant coach(es)

- Kyle Smithpeters (Southern Illinois)
- Ryan Sharbaugh (Westminster College)
- Matt Cline (South Alabama)
- Steve Wright (Bowling Green)
- Dickey Nutt (Oklahoma State)

Legend

- (C) Team captain
- (S) Suspended
- (I) Ineligible
- (W) Walk-on
- Injured
- Current redshirt

Roster

== Schedule and results ==
Date time, TV	Rank^{#}	Opponent^{#}	Result	Record	High points	High rebounds	High assists	Site (attendance) city, state
Exhibition
October 24, 2025*; 9:00 p.m., SECN		Kansas State	W 100–91		16 – Tied	10 – Phillips Jr.	4 – Robinson II	Mizzou Arena; Columbia, MO
Non-conference regular season
November 3, 2025*; 6:00 p.m., ESPN+		at Howard	W 88–67	1–0	16 – Phillips Jr.	11 – Phillips Jr.	4 – Barrett	Burr Gymnasium (2,312); Washington, D.C.
November 7, 2025*; 7:00 p.m., SECN+/ESPN+		Southeast Missouri State	W 89–84	2–0	29 – Mitchell	5 – Tied	3 – Mitchell	Mizzou Arena (11,314); Columbia, MO
November 9, 2025*; 1:00 p.m., SECN+/ESPN+		VMI	W 106–68	3–0	24 – Mitchell	10 – Tied	5 – Stone	Mizzou Arena (7,986); Columbia, MO
November 12, 2025*; 7:00 p.m., SECN+/ESPN+		Minnesota	W 83–60	4–0	18 – Mitchell	8 – Crews	6 – Mitchell	Mizzou Arena (8,969); Columbia, MO
November 17, 2025*; 7:00 p.m., SECN+/ESPN+		Prairie View A&M; Missouri Multi-Team Event	W 91–73	5–0	20 – Crews	13 – Phillips Jr.	5 – Tied	Mizzou Arena (7,595); Columbia, MO
November 20, 2025*; 7:00 p.m., SECN+/ESPN+		South Dakota; Missouri Multi-Team Event	W 102–68	6–0	22 – Mitchell	12 – Porter	6 – Robinson II	Mizzou Arena (8,027); Columbia, MO
November 25, 2025*; 7:00 p.m., SECN+/ESPN+		South Carolina State; Missouri Multi-Team Event	W 98–66	7–0	17 – Phillips Jr.	8 – Phillips Jr.	6 – Mitchell	Mizzou Arena (7,887); Columbia, MO
November 28, 2025*; 1:00 p.m., SECN+/ESPN+		Cleveland State	W 86–59	8–0	20 – Crews	8 – Crews	4 – Mitchell	Mizzou Arena (9,463); Columbia, MO
December 2, 2025*; 8:00 p.m., ESPNU		at Notre Dame; ACC–SEC Challenge	L 71–76	8–1	26 – Mitchell	7 – Robinson	4 – Barrett	Joyce Center (4,980); South Bend, IN
December 7, 2025*; 12:00 p.m., ESPN2		vs. No. 21 Kansas; Border War/StorageMart Border Showdown	L 60–80	8–2	21 – Mitchell	7 – Tied	6 – Robinson II	T-Mobile Center (15,407); Kansas City, MO
December 11, 2025*; 7:00 p.m., SECN+/ESPN+		Alabama State	W 85–77	9–2	20 – Crews	5 – Phillips Jr.	5 – Robinson II	Mizzou Arena (7,976); Columbia, MO
December 14, 2025*; 1:00 p.m., SECN		Bethune–Cookman	W 82–60	10–2	20 – Crews	7 – Mitchell	7 – Robinson II	Mizzou Arena (8,049); Columbia, MO
December 22, 2025*; 7:00 p.m., FS1		vs. No. 20 Illinois; Braggin' Rights	L 48–91	10–3	17 – Mack	4 – Crews	3 – Barrett	Enterprise Center (18,505); St. Louis, MO
SEC regular season
January 3, 2026; 7:30 p.m., SECN		No. 22 Florida	W 76–74	11–3 (1–0)	19 – Robinson II	8 – Robinson II	5 – Robinson II	Mizzou Arena (12,746); Columbia, MO
January 7, 2026; 6:00 p.m., ESPN2		at Kentucky	W 73–68	12–3 (2–0)	21 – Mitchell	7 – Stone	10 – Robinson II	Rupp Arena (19,085); Lexington, KY
January 10, 2026; 5:00 p.m., SECN		at Ole Miss	L 69–76	12–4 (2–1)	20 – Mitchell	8 – Mitchell	7 – Mitchell	SJB Pavilion (7,859); Oxford, MS
January 14, 2026; 6:00 p.m., ESPN2		Auburn	W 84–74	13–4 (3–1)	22 – Stone	6 – Stone	5 – Mitchell	Mizzou Arena (10,196); Columbia, MO
January 17, 2026; 2:30 p.m., SECN		at LSU	L 70–78	13–5 (3–2)	20 – Stone	5 – Tied	4 – Barrett	Pete Maravich Assembly Center (7,816); Baton Rouge, LA
January 20, 2026; 8:00 p.m., SECN		No. 21 Georgia	L 72–74	13–6 (3–3)	18 – Mitchell	8 – Stone	6 – Stone	Mizzou Arena (11,065); Columbia, MO
January 24, 2026; 1:00 p.m., ESPN2		Oklahoma	W 88–87 ^{OT}	14–6 (4–3)	25 – Mitchell	10 – Mitchell	4 – Mitchell	Mizzou Arena (10,852); Columbia, MO
January 27, 2026; 8:00 p.m., SECN		at No. 23 Alabama	L 64–90	14–7 (4–4)	13 – Barrett	8 – Tied	4 – Tied	Coleman Coliseum (13,474); Tuscaloosa, AL
January 31, 2026; 2:30 p.m., SECN		Mississippi State	W 84–79	15–7 (5–4)	19 – Mitchell	8 – Barrett	4 – Barrett, Mitchell	Mizzou Arena (12,527); Columbia, MO
February 7, 2026; 12:00 p.m., SECN		at South Carolina	W 78–59	16–7 (6–4)	22 – Stone	11 – Mitchell	5 – Mitchell	Colonial Life Arena (10,505); Columbia, SC
February 11, 2026; 8:00 p.m., SECN		at Texas A&M	W 86–85	17–7 (7–4)	23 – Pierce	9 – Pierce	8 – Mitchell	Reed Arena (7,749); College Station, TX
February 14, 2026; 7:30 p.m., ESPN2		Texas	L 68–85	17–8 (7–5)	16 – Tied	5 – Stone	2 – Tied	Mizzou Arena (15,061); Columbia, MO
February 18, 2026; 8:00 p.m., SECN		No. 19 Vanderbilt	W 81–80	18–8 (8–5)	19 – Stone	7 – Stone	9 – Mitchell	Mizzou Arena (10,234); Columbia, MO
February 21, 2026; 3:00 p.m., ESPN		at No. 20 Arkansas	L 86–94	18–9 (8–6)	26 – Mitchell	4 – Tied	8 – Mitchell	Bud Walton Arena (19,200); Fayetteville, AR
February 24, 2026; 8:00 p.m., SECN		No. 22 Tennessee	W 73–69	19–9 (9–6)	28 – Barrett	7 – Burns	3 – Pierce	Mizzou Arena (11,064); Columbia, MO
February 28, 2026; 12:00 p.m., SECN		at Mississippi State	W 88–64	20–9 (10–6)	17 – Mitchell	10 – Stone	5 – Barrett	Humphrey Coliseum (7,012); Starkville, MS
March 3, 2026; 6:00 p.m., ESPNU		at Oklahoma	L 64–80	20–10 (10–7)	17 – Mitchell	5 – Tied	5 – Barrett	Lloyd Noble Center (5,773); Norman, OK
March 7, 2026; 11:00 a.m., ESPN		No. 20 Arkansas	L 84–88 ^{OT}	20–11 (10–8)	32 – Mitchell	10 – Phillips Jr.	5 – Robinson II	Mizzou Arena (15,061); Columbia, MO
SEC Tournament
March 12, 2026; 11:30 a.m., SECN	(8)	vs. (9) Kentucky; Second round	L 72–78	20–12	32 – Mitchell	7 – Tied	7 – Barrett	Bridgestone Arena (15,719); Nashville, TN
NCAA Tournament
March 20, 2026*; 9:10 p.m., truTV	(10 W)	vs. (7 W) No. 25 Miami (FL); First round	L 66–80	20–13	21 – Stone	6 – Stone	5 – Mitchell, Robinson II	Enterprise Center (17,726); St. Louis, MO
*Non-conference game. ^{#}Rankings from AP Poll. (#) Tournament seedings in parentheses. W=West. All times are in Central Time.

== Rankings ==
Ranking movements Legend: ██ Increase in ranking ██ Decrease in ranking — = Not ranked RV = Received votes
	Week																				
Poll	Pre	1	2	3	4	5	6	7	8	9	10	11	12	13	14	15	16	17	18	19	Final
AP	RV	RV	RV	RV	RV	—	—	—	—*	—	—	—	—	—	—	—	—	—	RV	—	—
Coaches	RV	RV	RV	RV	RV	RV	RV	—	—	RV	—	—	—	—	—	—	—	—	—	—	—

*AP did not release a week 8 poll.
