= Mongolia men's national basketball team =

Men's basketball team representing Mongolia

Mongolia
- FIBA ranking: NR (1 September 2026)
- Joined FIBA: 2000
- FIBA zone: FIBA Asia
- National federation: Mongolian Basketball Association
- Coach: Vassilis Fragkias
- Nickname: Хөх чононууд (Blue Wolves)

FIBA World Cup
- Appearances: None

FIBA Asia Cup
- Appearances: None
Home	Away

First international
- South Korea 145–65 Mongolia (Busan, South Korea; 28 September 2002)

Biggest win
- Fiji 40–102 Mongolia (Ulaanbaatar, Mongolia; 30 August 2026)

Biggest defeat
- South Korea 145–65 Mongolia (Busan, South Korea; 28 September 2002)

The Mongolia men's national basketball team (Mongolian: Монголын сагсан бөмбөгийн шигшээ баг) represents Mongolia in international basketball. The national team is controlled by the Mongolian Basketball Association (MBA).

== Competitive record ==
=== FIBA World Cup ===
FIBA World Cup
Year	Position	Pld	W	L
1950 to 1998	No national representative			
(United States) 2002	Did not enter			
(Japan) 2006	Did not enter			
(Turkey) 2010	Did not qualify			
(Spain) 2014	Did not qualify			
(China) 2019	Did not enter			
(Philippines) (Japan) (Indonesia) 2023	Did not enter			
(Qatar) 2027	Did not enter			
(France) 2031	To be determined			
Total	0/7	0	0	0

=== FIBA Asia Cup ===
FIBA Asia Cup
Year	Position	Pld	W	L
1960 to 1999	No national representative			
(China) 2001	Did not enter			
(China) 2003	Did not enter			
(Qatar) 2005	Did not enter			
(Japan) 2007	Did not enter			
(China) 2009	Did not qualify			
(China) 2011	Did not qualify			
(Philippines) 2013	Did not qualify			
(China) 2015	Did not enter			
(Lebanon) 2017	Did not enter			
(Indonesia) 2022	Did not enter			
(Saudi Arabia) 2025	Did not qualify			
2029	To be determined			
Total	0/11	0	0	0

=== Asian Games ===
Asian Games
Year	Position	Pld	W	L
1951 to 1998	No national representative			
(South Korea) 2002	12th	5	0	5
(Qatar) 2006	13th	2	1	1
(China) 2010	10th	6	2	4
(South Korea) 2014	8th	10	3	7
(Indonesia) 2018	10th	3	1	2
(China) 2022	14th	3	0	3
(Japan) 2026	Did not enter			
Total	6/7	29	7	22

== Results and fixtures ==
=== 2026 ===
28 August 2026 2029 FIBA Asia Cup pre-qualifiers - 1st round	Mongolia	98–64	Vietnam	Ulaanbaatar, Mongolia
19:00 UTC+8	Scoring by quarter: 20–12, 29–14, 23–24, 26–14
	Pts: Enkhiin-Od 20; Rebs: Azbayar 10; Asts: Bolor-Erdene 12	Boxscore	Pts: Võ 12; Rebs: Dinh, Nguyên H. 4 Asts: three players 3	Arena: M bank Arena; Attendance: 1,353; Referees: Haruga Iwai (JPN), Cheon Kam-jae (KOR), Lin Yuan-dian (TPE)

30 August 2026 2029 FIBA Asia Cup pre-qualifiers - 1st round	Fiji	40–102	Mongolia	Ulaanbaatar, Mongolia
17:00 UTC+8	Scoring by quarter: 11–20, 11–30, 9–31, 9–21
	Pts: Waqabaca 8 Rebs: Fox 6 Asts: Lum Kon 4	Boxscore	Pts: Khishigbaatar 16; Rebs: Khishigbaatar 7 Asts: Enkhbaatar 6	Arena: M bank Arena; Attendance: 2,700; Referees: Cheon Kam-jae (KOR), Lin Yuan-dian (TPE), Wang Wansong (CHN)

31 August 2026 2029 FIBA Asia Cup pre-qualifiers - 1st round	Thailand	69–66	Mongolia	Ulaanbaatar, Mongolia
19:00 UTC+8	Scoring by quarter: 19–14, 20–19, 18–14, 12–19
	Pts: Ejesu 24; Rebs: Ejesu 13; Asts: Jaimsawad, Lish 4	Boxscore	Pts: Sharavjamts 21; Rebs: Sharavjamts 17; Asts: Bolor-Erdene 4	Arena: M bank Arena; Attendance: 3,300; Referees: Haruga Iwai (JPN), Anton Kozlov (KAZ), Wang Wansong (CHN)

26 November 2026 2029 FIBA Asia Cup pre-qualifiers - 2nd round	Mongolia	vs.	Indonesia	Ulaanbaatar, Mongolia
19:00 UTC+8
		Boxscore		Arena: M bank Arena

27 November 2026 2029 FIBA Asia Cup pre-qualifiers - 2nd round	Hong Kong	vs.	Mongolia	Ulaanbaatar, Mongolia
19:00 UTC+8
		Boxscore		Arena: M bank Arena

29 November 2026 2029 FIBA Asia Cup pre-qualifiers - 2nd round	Mongolia	vs.	Malaysia	Ulaanbaatar, Mongolia
19:00 UTC+8
		Boxscore		Arena: M bank Arena

== Team ==
=== Current roster ===
Mongolia men's national basketball team roster
Players
Coaches

Pos.	No.	Name	Age – Date of birth	Height	Club
	2	Bolor-Erdene Gantsolmon	22 – 17 November 2003	6 ft 0 in (1.83 m)	Erdenet Miners	(Mongolia)
F	3	Enkhbayasgalan Amarbayasgalan	29 – 14 August 1997	6 ft 4 in (1.93 m)	Erdenet Miners	(Mongolia)
G	4	Uuganbayar Tumenbayar	28 – 17 February 1998	6 ft 0 in (1.83 m)	Bishrelt Metal	(Mongolia)
G	5	Saruul-Erdene Enkhbaatar	27 – 18 January 1999	6 ft 2 in (1.88 m)	SG Apes	(Mongolia)
G	6	Bayasgalan Delgerchuluun	28 – 30 October 1997	6 ft 0 in (1.83 m)	TSG GhostHawks	(Taiwan)
C	7	Azbayar Altangerel	21 – 28 March 2005	6 ft 8 in (2.03 m)	Fukushima Firebonds	(Japan)
G	8	Erdenetsogt Ochirbat (C)	31 – 14 January 1995	6 ft 2 in (1.88 m)	BCH Knights	(Mongolia)
C	9	Orgil Khishigbaatar	23 – 17 May 2003	6 ft 8 in (2.03 m)	Fukui Blowinds	(Japan)
G	10	Barsbold Baatar-Erdene	21 – 19 October 2004	6 ft 0 in (1.83 m)	Khasin Khuleguud	(Mongolia)
G	22	Sugar-Ochir Erdenetsetseg	27 – 2 July 1999	6 ft 8 in (2.03 m)	BCH Knights	(Mongolia)
G	25	Binderiya Sandagdorj	22 – 8 March 2004	6 ft 8 in (2.03 m)	Khasin Khuleguud	(Mongolia)
G	55	Enkhiin-Od Sharavjamts	24 – 27 August 2002	6 ft 7 in (2.01 m)	South Carolina Gamecocks	(United States)

Head coach

- (Greece) Vassilis Fragkias

Assistant coach(es)

- (Mongolia) Gankhulug Batjargal
- (Mongolia) Azbayar Tserendagva
- (Mongolia) Tamjid Battuvshin

Legend

- (C) Team captain
- Club – describes last
  club before the tournament
- Age – describes age
  on 31 August 2026

=== Depth chart ===
Pos.	Starting 5	Bench 1	Bench 2
C	Azbayar Altangerel	Orgil Khishigbaatar	Sugar-Ochir Erdenetsetseg
PF	Binderiya Sandagdorj	Enkhbayarsgalan Amarbayasgalan
SF	Enkhiin-Od Sharavjamts	Saruul-Erdene Enkhbaatar
SG	Erdenetsogt Ochirbat	Bayasgalan Delgerchuluun	Uuganbayar Tumenbayar
PG	Barsbold Baatar-Erdene	Bolor-erdene Gantsolmon

== See also ==
- Mongolia men's national under-18 basketball team
- Mongolia men's national 3x3 team
