= Mike Sharavjamts =

Mongolian basketball player (born 2002)

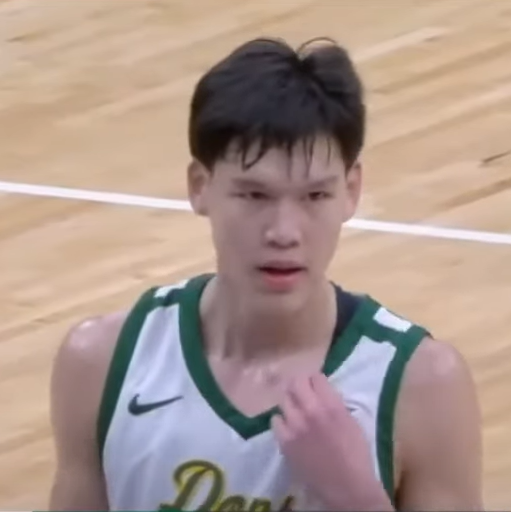

No. 55 – Osceola Magic
- Position: Small forward / shooting guard
- League: NBA G League

Personal information
- Born: August 27, 2002 (age 24) Phoenix, Arizona, U.S.
- Listed height: 6 ft 9 in (2.06 m)
- Listed weight: 195 lb (88 kg)

Career information
- High school: Legacy Christian Academy (Xenia, Ohio); Prolific Prep (Napa, California); International Sports Academy (Willoughby, Ohio)
- College: Dayton (2022–2023); San Francisco (2023–2024); Utah (2024–2025); South Carolina (2025–2026)
- NBA draft: 2026: undrafted
- Playing career: 2026–present

Career history
- 2026–present: Osceola Magic

Career highlights
- Atlantic 10 All-Rookie team (2023); Nike Hoop Summit (2022)
- Stats at Basketball Reference

Enkhiin-Od Michael Sharavjamts (born August 27, 2002) is a Mongolian professional basketball player for the Osceola Magic of the NBA G League. He played college basketball for the Dayton Flyers, San Francisco Dons, Utah Utes and South Carolina Gamecocks. He was the first Mongolian citizen to earn an NCAA Division I athletic scholarship.

== Personal life ==
Mike Sharavjamts is the son of Sharavjamts Tserenjankhar and Erdenebulgan Purevsuren. His father, Sharavjamts Tserenjankhar, was a notable basketball player known as "The Mongolian Shark," and was the first Asian player to join the Harlem Globetrotters. Mike was born in Phoenix, Arizona, while his father was playing in the United States.

Growing up in a basketball family, Mike was influenced by his father's career and developed a passion for the sport from a young age. His grandfather Tserenjanhar was also a basketball player who played for the Mongolian national team. He has a brother (Munkhiin-Od).

== High school career ==
Mike Sharavjamts began his prep career at Legacy Christian in Xenia, Ohio, where he averaged 10.5 points over 19 games during the 2018–19 season.

Sharavjamts then moved to Prolific Prep in Napa, California, for his sophomore year in the 2019–20 season. His junior season was spent in his hometown of Ulaanbaatar, Mongolia, due to the height of the COVID-19 pandemic. During this time, he captained the Mongolian U18 team, leading them to a sixth-place finish at the 2019 FIBA 3x3 U18 World Cup held in Ulaanbaatar, Mongolia.

For his senior year, Sharavjamts joined the International Sports Academy (ISA) in Willoughby, Ohio. Here, he showcased his versatility and skill, averaging 10.2 points, 4.6 rebounds, and 3.6 assists across 24 games while shooting an impressive 51.2% from three-point range. His performance garnered him consensus four-star recruit status from ESPN, On3, Rivals, and 247Sports.

College recruiting
Name	Hometown	School	Height	Weight	Commit date
Mike Sharavjamts #55 SF	Ulaanbaatar, Mongolia	International Sports Academy	6 ft 8 in (2.03 m)	180 lb (82 kg)	Dec 13, 2021
Mike Sharavjamts #55 SF	Recruit ratings: Scout: Rivals: 247Sports: ESPN:				
Overall recruit ranking:
Note: In many cases, Scout, Rivals, 247Sports, On3, and ESPN may conflict in their listings of height and weight.; In these cases, the average was taken. ESPN grades are on a 100-point scale.; Sources: "Dayton 2022 Basketball Commitments". Rivals.; "Dayton Flyers 2022 Player Commits". ESPN.; "2022 Team Ranking". Rivals.

In addition to his high school and AAU (Midwest 3SSB team) commitments, Sharavjamts represented Mongolia on the global stage. He was a member of the World Team at the 2022 Nike Hoop Summit, where he logged 11 minutes, contributing 2 points, 2 steals, 2 blocks, and 1 assist.

Sharavjamts's high school career not only highlighted his individual talent but also his ability to adapt and excel in diverse competitive environments, paving the way for his historic achievement as a First Mongolian Division I scholarship athlete.

== College career ==
=== Dayton Flyers ===
Sharavjamts committed to play college basketball at the University of Dayton in 2022. As a freshman, he averaged 5.6 points, 1.9 rebounds, and 2.6 assists per game.

In March 2023, Sharavjamts announced that he would enter the 2023 NBA draft. In the summer of 2023, Sharavjamts announced that he would withdraw from the 2023 NBA draft and transferred to the San Francisco Dons.

=== San Francisco Dons ===
On June 14, 2023, head coach Chris Gerlufsen announced that Sharavjamts has signed to the San Francisco Dons.

In 2023–24 season, Sharavjamts started all 34 games for the San Francisco Dons, averaged 7.7 points, 3.0 rebounds, and 2.7 assists per game.

After the season Sharavjamts has announced he has entered the transfer portal second straight season.

=== Utah Utes ===
On June 4, 2024, Utah Utes men's basketball team announced they signed Sharavjamts for the upcoming season.

During the 2025 season, Sharavjamts averaged 7.2 points, 3.4 rebounds, and 2.8 assists per game, while shooting 40.6% from the field for the Utah Utes men's basketball. Midway through the season, the team underwent a coaching change, followed by an announcement regarding a roster rebuild for the upcoming year. After the season Sharavjamts entered the transfer portal.

=== South Carolina Gamecocks ===
On April 27, 2025, Sharavjamts announced his commitment to the South Carolina Gamecocks team for the 2025–26 season.

Sharavjamts played for the South Carolina Gamecocks during the 2025–26 season, appearing in 32 games and emerging as a key contributor for the team. He averaged 10.9 points, 5.6 rebounds, and 2.3 assists per game while shooting around 49% from the field.

During the season, he demonstrated his versatility by contributing across multiple statistical categories and was among the team's leaders in rebounds and all-around production. His performance included several standout games, including a career-high 21-point outing in conference play.

== National team career ==
As the captain of the Mongolia men's national under-18 basketball team, Mike competed in the 2019 FIBA 3x3 U18 World Cup in Ulaanbaatar, Mongolia, and finished in sixth place. He finished the tournament with the eighth-most points with 37 in just 5 games.

During the Nippon Life Cup 2026, an international friendly series held between the Mongolian and Japanese national teams on August 9–10, 2026, Mike made his national team first match. In the first game, he delivered an exceptional performance with 33 points, 14 rebounds, 7 assists, and 2 blocks to secure a victory for Mongolia. He continued his dominant play in the second game, recording 18 points, 10 rebounds, 9 assists, and 3 steals, proving his caliber as one of top basketball talents in Asia.

In his debut game for the Mongolian national basketball team on August 28, 2026, Mike delivered a dominant performance against Vietnam national basketball team, recording 20 points, 6 rebounds, and 2 assists in just 14 minutes to lead his team to a 98–64 victory.

== Professional career ==
=== Orlando Magic (2026) ===
After completing his senior collegiate season with the South Carolina Gamecocks, Sharavjamts automatically became eligible for the 2026 NBA draft. Although he went undrafted, he quickly reached an agreement to join the Orlando Magic as an undrafted free agent. He signed a Summer League contract to compete with the team in Las Vegas from July 9 to July 19, 2026, aiming to earn a spot on an NBA roster or a two-way contract for the upcoming season.

On October 5, 2026, Sharavjamts signed an Exhibit 10 contract with the Orlando Magic and was waived later that day. The transaction was part of a standard NBA roster mechanism that allows Orlando to retain his NBA G League rights, with Sharavjamts expected to join the Magic's G League affiliate, the Osceola Magic. Maher, Rory (2026-10-05). "Minor Roster Moves: Magic, Raptors, Jazz, Kings". Hoops Rumors."Orlando Magic Transactions 2026-27". CBS Sports."Mike Sharavjamts: Waived by Orlando". CBS Sports. 2026-10-05.

== Career statistics ==
=== College ===
Year	Team	GP	GS	MPG	FG%	3P%	FT%	RPG	APG	SPG	BPG	PPG
2022–23	Dayton	32	20	23.1	.388	.315	.677	1.9	2.6	.4	.3	5.6
2023–24	San Francisco	34	34	25.0	.424	.360	.824	3.0	2.7	.9	.4	7.7
2024–25	Utah	33	29	22.4	.406	.308	.614	3.4	2.8	.7	.7	7.2
2025–26	South Carolina	32	32	29.8	.490	.341	.876	5.6	2.3	.7	.9	10.9
Career		131	115	25.0	.431	.331	.778	3.5	2.6	.7	.6	7.9
