= 2025–26 Southeastern Conference men's basketball season =

2025-26 Southeastern Conference men's basketball season
- League: NCAA Division I
- Sport: Basketball
- Teams: 16
- TV partner(s): ESPN, SEC Network

Regular season
- Season champions: Florida Gators
- Season MVP: Darius Acuff Jr. – Arkansas
- Top scorer: Darius Acuff Jr. – 25.6 ppg

SEC tournament
- Venue: Bridgestone Arena, Nashville, Tennessee
- Champions: Arkansas
- Runners-up: Vanderbilt
- Finals MVP: Darius Acuff Jr.

SEC men's basketball seasons
- ← 2024–25 2026–27 →

2025–26 Southeastern Conference men's basketball standings
	Conf.				Overall
Team	W		L	PCT	W		L	PCT
No. 9 Florida	16	–	2	.889	27	–	8	.771
No. 16 Alabama	13	–	5	.722	25	–	10	.714
No. 13 Arkansas †	13	–	5	.722	28	–	9	.757
No. 19 Vanderbilt	11	–	7	.611	27	–	9	.750
No. 12 Tennessee	11	–	7	.611	25	–	12	.676
Texas A&M	11	–	7	.611	22	–	12	.647
Georgia	10	–	8	.556	22	–	11	.667
Missouri	10	–	8	.556	20	–	13	.606
Kentucky	10	–	8	.556	22	–	14	.611
No. 22 Texas	9	–	9	.500	21	–	15	.583
Oklahoma	7	–	11	.389	21	–	16	.568
Auburn	7	–	11	.389	22	–	16	.579
Mississippi State	5	–	13	.278	13	–	19	.406
South Carolina	4	–	14	.222	13	–	19	.406
Ole Miss	4	–	14	.222	15	–	20	.429
LSU	3	–	15	.167	15	–	17	.469
† 2026 SEC tournament winner Rankings from AP poll

The 2025–26 Southeastern Conference men's basketball season began with practices in October 2025. The season officially started on November 3, 2025, as part of the 2025–26 NCAA Division I men's basketball season. Conference play is scheduled to begin on January 3, 2026, and conclude on March 7, 2026. The 16 member teams will then participate in the 2026 SEC men's basketball tournament, scheduled for March 11–15, 2026, at Bridgestone Arena in Nashville, Tennessee.

This is the second season with 16 members, as Texas and Oklahoma joined the conference in 2025.

== Previous season ==
The Florida Gators, the tournament champions, received the conference’s automatic bid to the 2025 NCAA tournament. They went on to win the national title with a 65–63 championship victory over the Houston Cougars. The league set a record for the most schools sent to the NCAA tournament, with 14 out of its 16 members earning bids.

== Coaches ==
=== Coaching changes ===
Coach	School	Reason	Replacement
Bruce Pearl	Auburn	Retired	Steven Pearl
Rodney Terry	Texas	Fired	Sean Miller
Buzz Williams	Texas A&M	Accepted coaching position at Maryland	Bucky McMillan

=== Head coaches ===
Notes: Records shown are through the end of the 2024–25 season, before the start of the 2025–26 season. NCAA tournament appearances, Final Fours, and championships include achievements earned at other schools.

Team	Head coach	Previous job	Seasons at school	Record at school	SEC record	SEC titles	NCAA tournaments	NCAA Final Fours	NCAA Championships
Alabama	Nate Oats	Buffalo	7th	145–63 (.697)	75–33 (.694)	2	5	1	0
Arkansas	John Calipari	Kentucky	2nd	22–14 (.611)	8–10 (.444)	6	24	6	1
Auburn	Steven Pearl	N/A	1st	9-6 (.600)	0–2 (.000)	0	0	0	0
Florida	Todd Golden	San Francisco	4th	76–33 (.697)	34–20 (.630)	1	3	1	1
Georgia	Mike White	Florida	4th	56–46 (.549)	20–34 (.370)	0	5	0	0
Kentucky	Mark Pope	BYU	2nd	24–12 (.667)	10–8 (.556)	0	3	0	0
LSU	Matt McMahon	Murray State	4th	45–48 (.484)	14–35 (.286)	0	3	0	0
Oklahoma	Porter Moser	Loyola Chicago	5th	74–59 (.556)	6–12 (.333)	0	3	1	0
Ole Miss	Chris Beard	Texas	3rd	44–24 (.647)	17–19 (.472)	0	5	1	0
Mississippi State	Chris Jans	New Mexico State	4th	63–40 (.612)	24–30 (.444)	0	6	0	0
Missouri	Dennis Gates	Cleveland State	4th	55–46 (.545)	20–32 (.385)	0	3	0	0
South Carolina	Lamont Paris	Chattanooga	4th	49–49 (.500)	19–35 (.352)	0	2	0	0
Tennessee	Rick Barnes	Texas	11th	232–109 (.680)	111–66 (.627)	2	29	1	0
Texas	Sean Miller	Xavier	1st	0–0 (–)	0–0 (–)	0	13	0	0
Texas A&M	Bucky McMillan	Samford	1st	0–0 (–)	0–0 (–)	0	1	0	0
Vanderbilt	Mark Byington	James Madison	2nd	20–13 (.606)	8–10 (.444)	0	2	0	0

Notes:

- SEC records, conference titles, etc. are based on time at the current school, and are through the end of the 2025–26 season.
- NCAA tournament appearances, NCAA Final Fours, and championships also include achievements earned while at other schools.

== Off-season ==
=== Recruiting classes ===
Rankings
Team	ESPN	On3 Recruits	247 Sports	Signees
Alabama	No. 19	No. 6	No. 10	4
Arkansas	No. 3	No. 4	No. 4	6
Auburn	No. 11	No. 18	No. 14	6
Florida	No. 22	No. 7	No. 47	2
Georgia		No. 23	No. 28	3
LSU		No. 29	No. 23	4
Kentucky	No. 6	No. 16	No. 7	4
Missouri		No. 37	No. 76	2
Mississippi State	No. 12	No. 17	No. 19	5
Oklahoma		No. 43	No. 42	4
Ole Miss	No. 15	No. 12	No. 12	4
South Carolina		No. 49	No. 41	5
Tennessee	No. 7	No. 8	No. 8	6
Texas		No. 51	No. 36	3
Texas A&M		No. 81	No. 61	2
Vanderbilt		No. 78	No. 57	3

== Pre-season ==
=== Preseason watchlists ===
Below is a table of notable preseason watch lists.

Player	Wooden	Naismith	Olson	Robertson	Cousy	West	Erving	Malone	Abdul-Jabbar
Darius Acuff Jr., Arkansas	✓	✓	✓	✓	✓				
Nate Ament, Tennessee	✓	✓		✓			✓		
Alex Condon, Florida	✓	✓		✓					✓
Malique Ewin, Arkansas									✓
Boogie Fland, Florida	✓	✓		✓	✓				
Ja'Kobi Gillespie, Tennessee	✓	✓	✓	✓	✓				
Keyshawn Hall, Auburn			✓					✓	
Thomas Haugh, Florida	✓	✓		✓				✓	
Josh Hubbard, Mississippi State	✓	✓		✓	✓				
Karter Knox, Arkansas							✓		
Xaivian Lee, Florida	✓	✓				✓			
Jaland Lowe, Kentucky	✓	✓			✓				
Duke Miles, Vanderbilt			✓						
Mark Mitchell, Missouri				✓					
Felix Okpara, Tennessee									✓
Otega Oweh, Kentucky	✓	✓		✓		✓			
Tahaad Pettiford, Auburn	✓	✓		✓	✓				
Labaron Philon Jr., Alabama	✓	✓	✓	✓	✓				
Jayden Quaintance, Kentucky	✓								✓
Derrion Reid, Oklahoma							✓		
Dailyn Swain, Texas							✓		
D.J. Wagner, Arkansas	✓								

=== Preseason All-American teams ===
Player	AP	ESPN 2nd Team	ESPN 3rd Team	SI 2nd Team	SI 3rd Team	CBS Sports 2nd team	Blue Ribbon 1st team	Blue Ribbon 2nd team	Blue Ribbon 3rd team	SN 1st Team	SN 3rd Team
Nate Ament		✓							✓		
Alex Condon	✓		✓				✓				
Thomas Haugh					✓						
Otega Oweh		✓		✓		✓		✓		✓	
Tahaad Pettiford			✓				✓				✓
Labaron Philon Jr.					✓						

=== Preseason polls/ratings ===
	AP	Blue Ribbon	CBS Sports	Coaches	ESPN	Fox Sports	KenPom	NCAA Sports	Sports; Illustrated
Alabama	15	11	13	16	17	22	23	20	27
Arkansas	14	15	19	15	11	10	29	17	14
Auburn	20	13	26	22	14	15	31	27	16
Florida	3	1	11	3	2	16	2	5	3
Georgia	–	–	54	–	–	–	44	–	65
Kentucky	9	8	3	9	9	8	4	8	10
LSU	–	–	60	–	–	–	56	–	71
Missouri	RV	–	42	RV	–	–	28	32	34
Mississippi State	RV	–	37	–	–	–	26	36	54
Oklahoma	RV	–	28	–	–	–	58	–	37
Ole Miss	RV	–	36	RV	–	–	24	26	48
South Carolina	–	–	80	–	–	–	86	–	101
Tennessee	18	7	17	17	23	13	9	12	17
Texas	RV	24	34	RV	–	–	39	28	51
Texas A&M	–	–	56	–	–	–	35	37	32
Vanderbilt	RV	–	44	RV	–	–	19	–	42

=== SEC media days ===
The SEC conducted its 2025 SEC Media Days in Birmingham, Alabama, in October 2025, broadcast on the SEC Network.

Teams and representatives attending were as follows:

Team	Coach	Player
Alabama	Nate Oats	
Arkansas	John Calipari	
Auburn	Bruce Pearl	
Florida	Todd Golden	
Georgia	Mike White	
Kentucky	Mark Pope	
LSU	Matt McMahon	
Mississippi State	Chris Jans	
Missouri	Dennis Gates	
Oklahoma	Porter Moser	
Ole Miss	Chris Beard	
South Carolina	Lamont Paris	
Tennessee	Rick Barnes	
Texas	Sean Miller	
Texas A&M	Bucky McMillan	
Vanderbilt	Mark Byington	

=== SEC preseason coaches poll ===
The SEC preseason coaches poll was released in October 2025. All awards were voted on by the league's 16 head coaches, however they could not vote for their own team/players.

Men's Basketball Preseason Poll
Place	Team	Points
1.	Florida	
2.	Kentucky	
3.	Alabama	
4.	Tennessee	
5.	Arkansas	
6.	Auburn	
7.	Missouri	
8.	Ole Miss	
9.	Mississippi State	
10.	Texas	
11.	Oklahoma	
12.	Texas A&M	
13.	Vanderbilt	
14.	Georgia	
15.	LSU	
16.	South Carolina	
Reference: (#) first-place votes

=== SEC Preseason All-Conference ===
All-SEC Preseason First team

Player	School	Pos.	Yr.	Ht., Wt.	Hometown (Last School)
Labaron Philon Jr.	Alabama	G	So.	6' 4", 185	Mobile, AL
Tahaad Pettiford	Auburn	G	So.	6' 1", 170	Jersey City, NJ
Alex Condon	Florida	C	Jr.	6' 11", 236	Perth, Australia
Otega Oweh	Kentucky	G	Sr.	6' 4", 220	Newark, NJ
Josh Hubbard	Mississippi State	G	Jr.	6' 0", 190	Madison, MS

All-SEC Preseason second team

Player	School	Pos.	Yr.	Ht., Wt.	Hometown (Last School)
Boogie Fland	Florida	G	So.	6' 3", 185	Bronx, NY
Malik Dia	Ole Miss	F	Sr.	6' 9", 250	Murfreesboro, TN
Mark Mitchell	Missouri	F	Jr.	6' 9", 230	Kansas City, KS
Nate Ament	Tennessee	F	Fr.	6' 10", 207	Manassas, VA
Ja’Kobi Gillespie	Tennessee	G	Sr.	6' 1", 188	Greeneville, TN

All-SEC Preseason third team

Player	School	Pos.	Yr.	Ht., Wt.	Hometown (Last School)
Aden Holloway	Alabama	G	Jr.	6' 1", 180	Charlotte, NC
Darius Acuff Jr.	Arkansas	G	Fr.	6' 3", 190	Detroit, MI
Karter Knox	Arkansas	G	So.	6' 6", 220	Tampa, FL
D.J. Wagner	Arkansas	G	Jr.	6' 4", 190	Camden, NJ
Thomas Haugh	Florida	F	Jr.	6' 9", 215	New Oxford, PA

== Regular season ==
The schedule was released in late October. Before the season, it was announced that for the seventh consecutive season, all regular-season conference games and conference tournament games would be broadcast nationally by the ESPN Inc. family of networks, including ABC, ESPN, ESPN2, ESPNU, and the SEC Network.

The conference matchups for each school had yet to be announced.

Key
Schedule	Home & Away Conference Schedule
	Home (H) & Away (A)
	Home Only (H)
	Away Only (A)

	Alabama	Arkansas	Auburn	Florida	Georgia	Kentucky	LSU	Mississippi State	Missouri	Oklahoma	Ole Miss	South Carolina	Tennessee	Texas	Texas A&M	Vanderbilt
vs. Alabama	—															
vs. Arkansas		—														
vs. Auburn			—													
vs. Florida				—												
vs. Georgia					—											
vs. Kentucky						—										
vs. LSU							—									
vs. Mississippi State								—								
vs. Missouri									—							
vs. Oklahoma										—						
vs. Ole Miss											—					
vs. South Carolina												—				
vs. Tennessee													—			
vs. Texas														—		
vs. Texas A&M															—	
vs. Vanderbilt																—

=== Conference matrix ===
	Alabama	Arkansas	Auburn	Florida	Georgia	Kentucky	LSU	Mississippi State	Missouri	Oklahoma	Ole Miss	South Carolina	Tennessee	Texas	Texas A&M	Vanderbilt
vs. Alabama	—	0–1	0–2	1–0	1–0	0–1	0–1	0–1	0–2	0–1	0–1	0–1	1–1	1-0	0–1	1–0
vs. Arkansas	1–0	—	1–1	1–0	1–0	1–0	0–2	0–1	0–2	0–1	0–1	0–1	0–1	0–1	0–1	0–1
vs. Auburn	2–0	1–1	—	0–1	1–0	0–1	0–1	1–0	1–0	1–0	1–1	0–1	1–0	0–1	1–0	1–0
vs. Florida	0–1	0–1	1–0	—	0–2	0–2	0–1	0–1	1–0	0–1	0–1	0–2	0–1	0–1	0–1	0–1
vs. Georgia	0–1	0–1	0–1	2–0	—	0–1	0–1	0–1	0–1	1–0	1–0	0–2	1–0	1–1	1–0	1–0
vs. Kentucky	1–0	0–1	1–0	2–0	1–0	—	0–1	0–1	1–0	0–1	0–1	0–1	0–2	0–1	0–1	1–1
vs. LSU	1–0	2–0	1–0	1–0	1–0	1–0	—	1–0	0–1	1–0	0–1	1–1	1–0	1–0	2–0	1–0
vs. Mississippi State	2–0	1–0	0–1	1–0	1–0	1–0	0–1	—	2–0	0–1	1–1	1–0	1–0	0–1	1–0	1–0
vs. Missouri	1–0	2–0	0–1	0–1	1–0	0–1	1–0	0–2	—	1–1	1–0	0–1	0–1	1–0	0–1	0–1
vs. Oklahoma	1–0	1–0	0–1	1–0	0–1	1–0	0–1	1–0	1–1	—	0–1	1–0	1–0	1–1	2–0	0–1
vs. Ole Miss	1–0	1–0	1–1	1–0	0–1	1–0	1–0	1–1	0–1	1–0	—	1–0	1–0	1–0	1–0	2–0
vs. South Carolina	1–0	1–0	1–0	2–0	2–0	1–0	1–1	0–1	1–0	0–1	0–1	—	1–0	1–0	1–0	1–0
vs. Tennessee	1–1	1–0	0–1	1–0	0–1	2–0	0–1	0–1	1–0	0–1	0–1	0–1	—	0–1	0–1	1–1
vs. Texas	0–1	1–0	1–0	1–0	1–1	1–0	0–1	1–0	0–1	1–1	0–1	0–1	1–0	—	1–1	0–1
vs. Texas A&M	1–0	1–0	0–1	1–0	0–1	0–1	0–2	0–1	1–0	0–1	0–2	0–1	1–0	1–1	—	1–0
vs. Vanderbilt	0–1	1–0	0–1	1–0	0–1	1–1	0–1	0–1	1–0	1–0	0–2	0–1	1–1	1–0	0–1	—
Total	13-5	13-5	7-11	16-2	10-8	10-8	3-15	5-13	10-8	7-11	4-14	4-14	11-7	9-9	11-7	11-7

Thru Mar. 2026.

=== Points scored ===
Team	For	Against	Difference
Alabama	2,856	2,591	265
Arkansas	2,797	2,479	318
Auburn	2,589	2,487	102
Florida	2,719	2,222	497
Georgia	2,802	2,457	345
Kentucky	2,518	2,285	233
LSU	2,524	2,425	99
Mississippi State	2,423	2,539	-116
Missouri	2,477	2,333	144
Oklahoma	2,565	2,402	163
Ole Miss	2,334	2,354	-20
South Carolina	2,324	2,361	-37
Tennessee	2,482	2,152	330
Texas	2,615	2,382	233
Texas A&M	2,744	2,463	281
Vanderbilt	2,695	2,329	366

Note: Thru March, 2026

=== Multi-team tournaments ===
Team	Tournament	Finish
Alabama	Players Era Festival	7th
Arkansas	−	−
Auburn	Players Era Festival	12th
Florida	Rady Children's Invitational	3rd
Georgia	Charleston Classic	2nd
Kentucky	−	−
LSU	Emerald Coast Classic	1st
Missouri	−	−
Mississippi State	Hall of Fame Classic	4th
Oklahoma	−	−
Ole Miss	Acrisure Classic	4th
South Carolina	Greenbrier Tip-Off	4th
Tennessee	Players Era Festival	4th
Texas	Maui Invitational	5th
Texas A&M	−	−
Vanderbilt	Battle 4 Atlantis	1st

=== ACC–SEC Challenge ===
Date	Visitor	Home	Site	Significance	Score	Conference record
December 2nd, 2025	Texas A&M	Pittsburgh	Petersen Events Center	ACC-SEC Challenge	Texas A&M 81-73	1-0
December 2nd, 2025	Virginia Tech	South Carolina	Colonial Life Arena	ACC-SEC Challenge	Virginia Tech 86-83^{OT}	1-1
December 2nd, 2025	No. 13 Tennessee	Syracuse	JMA Wireless Dome	ACC-SEC Challenge	Syracuse 62-60	1-2
December 2nd, 2025	Oklahoma	Wake Forest	LJVM Coliseum	ACC-SEC Challenge	Oklahoma 86-68	2-2
December 2nd, 2025	No. 15 Florida	No. 4 Duke	Cameron Indoor Stadium	ACC-SEC Challenge	No. 4 Duke 67-66	2-3
December 2nd, 2025	Miami (FL)	Ole Miss	SJB Pavilion	ACC-SEC Challenge	Miami (FL) 75-66	2-4
December 2nd, 2025	Georgia	Florida State	Donald L. Tucker Civic Center	ACC-SEC Challenge	Georgia 107-73	3-4
December 2nd, 2025	Missouri	Notre Dame	Joyce Center	ACC-SEC Challenge	Notre Dame 76-71	3-5
December 2nd, 2025	No. 16 North Carolina	No. 18 Kentucky	Rupp Arena	ACC-SEC Challenge	No. 16 North Carolina 67-64	3-6
December 3rd, 2025	LSU	Boston College	Conte Forum	ACC-SEC Challenge	LSU 78-69^{OT}	4-6
December 3rd, 2025	No. 6 Louisville	No. 25 Arkansas	Bud Walton Arena	ACC-SEC Challenge	No. 25 Arkansas 89-80	5-6
December 3rd, 2025	Clemson	No. 12 Alabama	Coleman Coliseum	ACC-SEC Challenge	No. 12 Alabama 90-84	6-6
December 3rd, 2025	SMU	No. 17 Vanderbilt	Memorial Gymnasium	ACC-SEC Challenge	No. 17 Vanderbilt 88-69	7-6
December 3rd, 2025	NC State	No. 20 Auburn	Neville Arena	ACC-SEC Challenge	No. 20 Auburn 83-73	8-6
December 3rd, 2025	Mississippi State	Georgia Tech	McCamish Pavilion	ACC-SEC Challenge	Mississippi State 85-73	9-6
December 3rd, 2025	Virginia	Texas	Moody Center	ACC-SEC Challenge	Virginia 88-69	9-7

=== Coast to Coast Challenge ===
Date	Visitor	Home	Site	Significance	Score	Conference record
December 7th, 2025	LSU	#19 Texas Tech	Dickies Arena • Fort Worth, Texas	USLBM Coast-to-Coast Challenge	No. 19 Texas Tech 82-58	0-1

Team rankings are reflective of the AP poll at the time the game was played, not current or final rankings.

=== Regular season honors ===
==== SEC Players of the Week ====
Throughout the regular season, the SEC offices will honor 2 players each week based on performance, naming them 'Player of the Week' and 'Freshman of the Week'.

Week	Player of the Week	Team	Freshman of the Week	Team	Ref.
November 10, 2025	Labaron Philon Jr.	Alabama	Nate Ament	Tennessee	
November 17, 2025	Thomas Haugh	Florida	Nate Ament (2)	Tennessee	
November 24, 2025	Labaron Philon Jr. (2)	Alabama	Amari Allen	Alabama	
December 1, 2025	Duke Miles	Vanderbilt	Amari Allen (2); Nate Ament (3)	Alabama; Tennessee	
December 8, 2025	Labaron Philon Jr. (3)	Alabama	Darius Acuff Jr.	Arkansas	
December 15, 2025	Trevon Brazile	Arkansas	Darius Acuff Jr. (2)	Arkansas	
December 22, 2025	Otega Oweh; Ja'Kobi Gillespie	Kentucky; Tennessee	Darius Acuff Jr. (3)	Arkansas	
January 5, 2026	Josh Hubbard	Mississippi State	Darius Acuff Jr. (4)	Arkansas	
January 12, 2026	Tyler Tanner	Vanderbilt	Darius Acuff Jr. (5)	Arkansas	
January 19, 2026	Rueben Chinyelu	Florida	Amari Allen (3)	Alabama	
January 26, 2026	Nate Ament; Keyshawn Hall	Tennessee; Auburn	Darius Acuff Jr. (6)	Arkansas	
February 2, 2026	Alex Condon; Rashaun Agee	Florida; Texas A&M	Nate Ament (4)	Tennessee	
February 9, 2026	Labaron Philon Jr. (4); Otega Oweh (2)	Alabama; Kentucky	Nate Ament (5)	Tennessee	
February 16, 2026	Xaivian Lee; Dailyn Swain	Florida; Texas	Darius Acuff Jr. (7)	Arkansas	
February 23, 2026	Darius Acuff Jr.	Arkansas	Nate Ament (6)	Tennessee	
March 2, 2026	Latrell Wrightsell Jr. Mark Mitchell	Alabama; Missouri	Malachi Moreno	Kentucky	

===== Totals per school =====
School	Total
Arkansas	9
Alabama	8
Tennessee	8
Florida	4
Kentucky	3
Vanderbilt	2
Auburn	1
Mississippi State	1
Missouri	1
Texas	1
Texas A&M	1
Georgia	0
LSU	0
Oklahoma	0
Ole Miss	0
South Carolina	0

== SEC records vs other conferences ==
The SEC has a record of 155–50 in non-conference play for the 2025–26 season. Only the regular season records are displayed.

Regular season

Power conferences
Conference	Record
ACC	17–15
Big East	7–4
Big Ten	5–11
Big 12	6–15
Combined	34–45

Other conferences
Conference	Record
America East	1–0
American	6–0
ASUN	16–0
Atlantic 10	2–0
Big Sky	1–0
Big South	5–0
Big West	1–0
Coastal	1–0
Conference USA	3–0
Horizon	2–0
Ivy League	2–0
Metro Atlantic	4–0
Mid-American	0–0
Mid-Eastern Athletic	7–0
Missouri Valley	2–0
Mountain West	2–1
Northeast	7–0
Ohio Valley	6–0
Patriot	3–0
Southern	7–0
Southland	8–0
Southwestern Athletic	22–0
Summit	6–0
Sun Belt	5–0
West Coast (Note: Gonzaga, playing its final season in the WCC before joining the Pac-12 Conference in July 2026, is widely considered a major program despite its mid-major affiliation. SEC teams went 0–3 against Gonzaga in the regular season.)	1–4
Western Athletic	1–0
Combined	121–5

Thru December 30, 2025

Postseason

Power conferences
Conference	Record
ACC	2–1
Big East	0–0
Big Ten	0–5
Big 12	5–4
Combined	7–10

Other conferences
Conference	Record
America East	0–0
American	1–0
ASUN	0–0
Atlantic 10	0–1
Big Sky	0–0
Big South	1–0
Big West	1–0
Coastal	1–0
Conference USA	0–0
Horizon	0–0
Ivy League	0–0
Metro Atlantic	0–0
Mid-American	1–0
Mid-Eastern Athletic	0–0
Missouri Valley	1–0
Mountain West	1–0
Northeast	0–0
Ohio Valley	0–0
Patriot	0–0
Southern	0–0
Southland	1–0
Southwestern Athletic	1–0
Summit	0–0
Sun Belt	1–0
West Coast	4–0
Western Athletic	0–0
Combined	14–1

Thru April 5, 2026

=== Record against ranked non-conference opponents ===
This is a list of games against ranked opponents only (rankings from the AP Poll at time of the game):

Date	Visitor	Home	Site	Significance	Score	Conference record
Nov. 3	No. 3 Florida†	No. 13 Arizona	T-Mobile Arena ● Las Vegas, NV	Hall of Fame Series	Arizona 93−87	0−1
Nov. 4	Texas†	No. 6 Duke	Spectrum Center ● Charlotte, NC	Dick Vitale Invitational	Duke 75−60	0−2
Nov. 8	No. 15 Alabama	No. 5 St. John's	Madison Square Garden ● New York, NY	—	Alabama 103−96	1−2
Nov. 8	No. 14 Arkansas	No. 22 Michigan State	Breslin Center ● East Lansing, MI	—	Michigan State 69−66	1−3
Nov. 8	Oklahoma	No. 21 Gonzaga	Numerica Veterans Arena ● Spokane, WA	The Bad Boy Mowers Series	Gonzaga 83−68	1−4
Nov. 10	Mississippi State†	No. 16 Iowa State	Sanford Pentagon ● Sioux Falls, SD	—	Iowa State 96−80	1−5
Nov. 11	No. 9 Kentucky	No. 12 Louisville	KFC Yum! Center ● Louisville, KY	Rivalry	Louisville 96−88	1−6
Nov. 13	No. 2 Purdue	No. 8 Alabama	Coleman Coliseum ● Tuscaloosa, AL	—	Purdue 87−80	1−7
Nov. 16	No. 1 Houston	No. 22 Auburn†	Legacy Arena ● Birmingham, AL	RxBenefits Battleground 2k25	Houston 73−72	1−8
Nov. 18	No. 17 Michigan State	No. 12 Kentucky†	Madison Square Garden ● New York, NY	Champions Classic	Michigan State 83−66	1−9
Nov. 19	No. 11 Alabama†	No. 8 Illinois	United Center ● Chicago, IL	—	Alabama 90−86	2−9
Nov. 24	No. 12 Gonzaga	No. 8 Alabama†	MGM Grand Garden Arena ● Las Vegas, NV	Players Era Festival	Gonzaga 95−85	2−10
Nov. 25	No. 17 Tennessee†	No. 3 Houston	MGM Grand Garden Arena ● Las Vegas, NV	Players Era Festival	Tennessee 76−73	3−10
Nov. 25	No. 21 Auburn†	No. 7 Michigan	Michelob Ultra Arena ● Las Vegas, NV	Players Era Festival	Michigan 102−72	3−11
Nov. 26	No. 14 St. John's	No. 21 Auburn†	Michelob Ultra Arena ● Las Vegas, NV	Players Era Festival	Auburn 85−74	4−11
Nov. 26	No. 23 NC State	Texas†	Lahaina Civic Center ● Lahaina, HI	Maui Invitational	Texas 102−97	5−11
Nov. 27	No. 4 Duke	No. 22 Arkansas†	United Center ● Chicago, IL	CBS Sports Thanksgiving Classic	Duke 80−71	5−12
Dec. 2	No. 15 Florida	No. 4 Duke	Cameron Indoor Stadium ● Durham, NC	ACC–SEC Challenge	Duke 67−66	5−13
Dec. 2	No. 16 North Carolina	No. 18 Kentucky	Rupp Arena ● Lexington, KY	ACC–SEC Challenge	North Carolina 67−64	5−14
Dec. 3	No. 6 Louisville	No. 25 Arkansas	Bud Walton Arena ● Fayetteville, AR	ACC–SEC Challenge	Arkansas 89−80	6−14
Dec. 5	No. 11 Gonzaga	No. 18 Kentucky†	Bridgestone Arena ● Nashville, TN	Music City Madness	Gonzaga 94−59	6−15
Dec. 6	No. 20 Auburn	No. 2 Arizona	McKale Memorial Center ● Tucson, AZ	—	Arizona 97−68	6−16
Dec. 6	No. 14 Illinois	No. 13 Tennessee†	Bridgestone Arena ● Nashville, TN	Music City Madness	Illinois 75−62	6−17
Dec. 6	Ole Miss	No. 23 St. John's	Madison Square Garden ● New York, NY	—	St. John's 63−58	6−18
Dec. 7	LSU†	No. 19 Texas Tech	Dickies Arena ● Fort Worth, TX	Coast-to-Coast Challenge	Texas Tech 82−58	6−19
Dec. 7	Missouri†	No. 21 Kansas	T-Mobile Center ● Kansas City, MO	—	Kansas 80−60	6−20
Dec. 9	No. 18 Florida†	No. 5 UConn	Madison Square Garden ● New York, NY	Jimmy V Classic	UConn 77−73	6−21
Dec. 12	Texas	No. 5 UConn	PeoplesBank Arena ● Hartford, CT	—	UConn 71−63	6−22
Dec. 13	No. 1 Arizona	No. 12 Alabama†	Legacy Arena ● Birmingham, AL	C.M. Newton Classic	Arizona 96−75	6−23
Dec. 13	No. 16 Texas Tech	No. 17 Arkansas†	American Airlines Center ● Dallas, TX	—	Arkansas 93−86	7−23
Dec. 16	No. 11 Louisville	No. 20 Tennessee	Food City Center ● Knoxville, TN	—	Tennessee 83−62	8−23
Dec. 20	No. 21 Auburn†	No. 6 Purdue	Gainbridge Fieldhouse ● Indianapolis, IN	Indy Classic	Purdue 88−60	8−24
Dec. 20	No. 8 Houston	No. 14 Arkansas†	Prudential Center ● Newark, NJ	Never Forget Tribute Classic	Houston 94−85	8−25
Dec. 20	No. 22 St. John's	Kentucky†	State Farm Arena ● Atlanta, GA	CBS Sports Classic	Kentucky 78−66	9−25
Dec. 22	Missouri†	No. 20 Illinois	Enterprise Center ● St. Louis, MO	Braggin' Rights	Illinois 91−48	9−26

† denotes neutral site game

== In-season awards and watchlists ==
=== Midseason watchlists ===
Below is a table of notable midseason watch lists.

Player	Wooden	Naismith	Naismith DPOY	Robertson	Olson	Cousy	West	Erving	Malone	Abdul-Jabbar
Darius Acuff Jr., Arkansas	✓	✓		✓		✓				
Nate Ament, Tennessee	✓	✓						✓		
Rueben Chinyelu, Florida			✓							
Alex Condon, Florida										✓
Somto Cyril, Georgia			✓							
Ja'Kobi Gillespie, Tennessee		✓								
Keyshawn Hall, Auburn		✓		✓						
Thomas Haugh, Florida	✓	✓		✓				✓		
Duke Miles, Vanderbilt			✓				✓			
Labaron Philon Jr., Alabama	✓	✓		✓		✓				
Dailyn Swain, Texas								✓		
Tyler Tanner, Vanderbilt		✓	✓	✓		✓				

=== Coaching Midseason watch lists ===
Coaches	Naismith
Mark Byington, Vanderbilt	✓

=== Final watchlists ===
Below is a table of notable year end watch lists.

Player	Wooden	Naismith	Naismith DPOY	Robertson	Cousy	West	Erving	Malone	Abdul-Jabbar	Olson
Darius Acuff Jr., Arkansas	✓				✓					✓
Nate Ament, Tennessee							✓			
Rueben Chinyelu, Florida			✓							
Alex Condon, Florida									✓	
Somto Cyril, Georgia			✓							
Ja'Kobi Gillespie, Tennessee										✓
Thomas Haugh, Florida	✓						✓			✓
Labaron Philon Jr., Alabama	✓									✓
Dailyn Swain, Texas							✓			
Tyler Tanner, Vanderbilt	✓		✓							✓

== Rankings ==
*AP does not release post-NCAA tournament rankings

	Improvement in ranking
	Drop in ranking
	Not ranked previous week
RV	Received votes but were not ranked in Top 25
NV	No votes received

Team	Poll	Pre	Wk 2	Wk 3	Wk 4	Wk 5	Wk 6	Wk 7	Wk 8	Wk 9	Wk 10	Wk 11	Wk 12	Wk 13	Wk 14	Wk 15	Wk 16	Wk 17	Wk 18	Wk 19	Wk 20	Final
Alabama	AP	15	8	11	8	12	12	16	14	14*	13	18	17	23	RV	RV	25	17	16	15	18	16
Alabama	C	16	9	11	9	12	12	16	15	15	12	18	17	23	RV	RV	RV	18	16	15	18	16
Arkansas	AP	14	21	21	22	25	17	14	18	18*	15	17	20	15	21	21	20	20	20	17	14	13
Arkansas	C	15	21	22	21	23	17	14	18	18	15	17	20	16	21	21	17	17	19	17	15	13
Auburn	AP	20	22	22	21	20	21	21	RV	RV*	RV	RV	NV	RV	RV	RV	NV	NV	NV	NV	NV	RV
Auburn	C	22	25	RV	25	24	24	24	RV	RV	NV	NV	NV	NV	NV	NV	NV	NV	NV	NV	NV	NV
Florida	AP	3	10	10	10	15	18	23	22	22*	RV	19	16	19	17	14	12	7	5	4	4	9
Florida	C	3	10	9	8	14	18	21	22	22	RV	20	16	21	16	14	11	7	5	4	4	9
Georgia	AP	NV	NV	RV	NV	NV	RV	25	23	23*	18	21	21	RV	RV	RV	NV	NV	NV	RV	NV	NV
Georgia	C	NV	RV	NV	NV	NV	RV	RV	24	24	20	22	22	RV	RV	RV	NV	RV	RV	RV	NV	NV
Kentucky	AP	9	9	12	19	18	RV	RV	RV	RV*	RV	NV	RV	RV	RV	25	RV	NV	RV	NV	RV	RV
Kentucky	C	9	8	13	18	18	RV	RV	RV	RV	RV	NV	RV	RV	RV	RV	RV	NV	RV	NV	NV	RV
LSU	AP	NV	NV	NV	NV	RV	RV	RV	RV	RV*	RV	NV	NV	NV	NV	NV	NV	NV	NV	NV	NV	NV
LSU	C	NV	NV	NV	NV	RV	RV	RV	RV	RV	NV	NV	NV	NV	NV	NV	NV	NV	NV	NV	NV	NV
Mississippi State	AP	RV	RV	NV	NV	NV	NV	NV	NV	NV*	NV	NV	NV	NV	NV	NV	NV	NV	NV	NV	NV	NV
Mississippi State	C	NV	NV	NV	NV	NV	NV	NV	NV	NV	NV	NV	NV	NV	NV	NV	NV	NV	NV	NV	NV	NV
Missouri	AP	RV	RV	RV	RV	RV	NV	NV	NV	NV*	NV	NV	NV	NV	NV	NV	NV	NV	RV	RV	NV	NV
Missouri	C	RV	RV	RV	RV	RV	RV	RV	NV	NV	RV	NV	NV	NV	NV	NV	NV	NV	RV	NV	NV	NV
Oklahoma	AP	RV	RV	NV	NV	NV	NV	NV	NV	NV*	NV	NV	NV	NV	NV	NV	NV	NV	NV	NV	NV	NV
Oklahoma	C	NV	NV	NV	NV	NV	NV	NV	NV	NV	NV	NV	NV	NV	NV	NV	NV	NV	NV	NV	NV	NV
Ole Miss	AP	RV	RV	RV	RV	NV	NV	NV	NV	NV*	NV	NV	NV	NV	NV	NV	NV	NV	NV	NV	NV	NV
Ole Miss	C	RV	RV	RV	RV	RV	NV	NV	NV	NV	NV	NV	NV	NV	NV	NV	NV	NV	NV	NV	NV	NV
South Carolina	AP	NV	NV	NV	NV	NV	NV	NV	NV	NV*	NV	NV	NV	NV	NV	NV	NV	NV	NV	NV	NV	NV
South Carolina	C	NV	NV	NV	NV	NV	NV	NV	NV	NV	NV	NV	NV	NV	NV	NV	NV	NV	NV	NV	NV	NV
Tennessee	AP	18	20	20	17	13	20	20	19	19*	21	24	RV	RV	25	RV	RV	22	23	25	24	12
Tennessee	C	17	18	17	16	13	20	23	20	20	22	RV	RV	RV	RV	RV	RV	22	25	RV	25	12
Texas	AP	RV	RV	NV	NV	NV	NV	NV	NV	NV*	RV	NV	NV	NV	NV	NV	NV	NV	NV	NV	NV	22
Texas	C	RV	RV	NV	NV	NV	NV	NV	NV	NV	NV	NV	NV	NV	NV	NV	NV	NV	NV	NV	NV	24
Texas A&M	AP	NV	NV	NV	NV	NV	NV	NV	NV	NV*	NV	RV	RV	RV	RV	NV	NV	RV	NV	NV	NV	RV
Texas A&M	C	NV	NV	NV	NV	NV	NV	NV	NV	NV	NV	RV	RV	RV	25	RV	NV	NV	NV	NV	NV	NV
Vanderbilt	AP	RV	RV	RV	24	17	15	13	11	11*	11	10	15	18	15	19	19	25	24	22	16	19
Vanderbilt	C	RV	RV	24	23	16	14	12	11	11	10	8	14	15	15	20	18	21	22	22	16	17

*AP did not release a week 9 poll.

== Postseason ==
=== SEC Tournament ===
- The 2026 SEC Men's Basketball tournament will be played on March 11–15, 2026, at Bridgestone Arena in Nashville, Tennessee.

* – denotes overtime

2026 SEC men's basketball tournament seeds and results
Seed	School	Conf.	Over.	Tiebreaker	First round March 11	Second round March 12	Quarterfinals March 13	Semifinals March 14	Championship March 15
1.	Florida#‡	16-2	25-6		Bye	Bye	vs. TBD		
2.	Alabama‡	13-5	23-8	1-0 vs Arkansas	Bye	Bye	vs. TBD		
3.	Arkansas‡	13-5	23-8	0-1 vs Alabama	Bye	Bye	vs. TBD		
4.	Vanderbilt‡	11-7	24-7	2-1 vs Tennessee & Texas A&M. 1-0 vs Alabama	Bye	Bye	vs. TBD		
5.	Tennessee†	11-7	21-10	2-1 vs Texas A&M & Vanderbilt. 1-1 vs Alabama	Bye	vs. TBD			
6.	Texas A&M†	11-7	21-10	0-2 vs Tennessee & Vanderbilt	Bye	vs. TBD			
7.	Georgia†	10-8	22-9	2-0 vs Kentucky & Missouri	Bye	vs. TBD			
8.	Missouri†	10-8	20-11	1-1 vs Georgia & Kentucky	Bye	vs. TBD			
9.	Kentucky	10-8	19-12	0-2 vs Georgia & Missouri	vs. LSU				
10.	Texas	9-9	18-13		vs. Ole Miss				
11.	Oklahoma	7-11	17-14	1-0 vs Auburn	vs. South Carolina				
12.	Auburn	7-11	16-15	0-1 vs Oklahoma	vs. Mississippi State				
13.	Mississippi State	5-13	13-18		vs. Auburn				
14.	South Carolina	4-14	13-18	1-0 vs Ole Miss	vs. Oklahoma				
15.	Ole Miss	4-14	12-19	0-1 vs South Carolina	vs. Texas				
16.	LSU	3-15	15-16		vs. Kentucky				
# – SEC regular season champions, and tournament No. 1 seed ‡ – Received a double-bye into the conference tournament quarterfinal round † – Received a single-bye into the conference tournament second round Overall records include all games played in the SEC tournament.

==== Bracket ====
First round Wednesday, March 11; SECN
9	Kentucky	87
16	LSU	82
12	Auburn	79
13	Mississippi State	61
10	Texas	66
15	Ole Miss	76
11	Oklahoma	86
14	South Carolina	74

Second round Thursday, March 12; SECN
8	Missouri	72
9	Kentucky	78
5	Tennessee	72
12	Auburn	62
7	Georgia	72
15	Ole Miss	76
6	Texas A&M	63
11	Oklahoma	83

Quarterfinals; Friday, March 13; ESPN/SECN
1	Florida	71
9	Kentucky	63
4	Vanderbilt	75
5	Tennessee	68
2	Alabama	79
15	Ole Miss	80
3	Arkansas	82
11	Oklahoma	79

Semifinals; Saturday, March 14; ESPN
1	Florida	74
4	Vanderbilt	91
15	Ole Miss	90
3	Arkansas	93*

Championship; Sunday, March 15; ESPN
4	Vanderbilt	75
3	Arkansas	86

* Indicates overtime game

=== NCAA Tournament ===
Seed	Region	School	First Four	First Round	Second Round	Sweet 16	Elite Eight	Final Four	Championship
1	South	Florida	Bye	W 114–55 vs. (16) Prairie View A&M	L 72–73 vs. (9) Iowa	DNP			
4	West	Arkansas	Bye	W 97–78 vs. (13) Hawaii	W 94–88 vs. (12) High Point	L 88–109 vs. (1) Arizona	DNP		
4	Midwest	Alabama	Bye	W 90–70 vs. (13) Hofstra	W 90–65 vs. (5) Texas Tech	L 77–90 vs. (1) Michigan	DNP		
5	South	Vanderbilt	Bye	W 78–68 vs. (12) McNeese	L 72–74 vs. (4) Nebraska	DNP			
6	Midwest	Tennessee	Bye	W 78–56 vs. (11) Miami (OH)	W 79–72 vs. (3) Virginia	W 76–62 vs. (2) Iowa State	L 62–95 vs. (1) Michigan	DNP	
7	Midwest	Kentucky	Bye	W 89–84 vs. (10) Santa Clara	L 63–82 vs. (2) Iowa State	DNP			
8	Midwest	Georgia	Bye	L 77–102 vs. (9) Saint Louis	DNP				
10	West	Missouri	Bye	L 66–80 vs. (7) Miami (FL)	DNP				
10	South	Texas A&M	Bye	W 63–50 vs. (7) Saint Mary's	L 57–88 vs. (2) Houston	DNP			
11	West	Texas	W 68–66 vs. (11) NC State	W 79–71 vs. (6) BYU	W 74–68 vs. (3) Gonzaga	L 77–79 vs. (2) Purdue	DNP		
	10 Bids	W–L (%):	1–0 (1.000)	8–2 (.800)	4–4 (.500)	1–3 (.250)	0–1 (.000)	0–0 (–)	0–0 (–)
Total: 14–10 (.583)

=== NIT ===
Seed	Region	School	First round	Second round	Quarterfinals	Semifinals	Final
1	Auburn	Auburn	W 78–67 vs. South Alabama	W 91–85 vs. (4) Seattle	W 75–69 vs. (2) Nevada	W 88–66 vs. (WS 4) Illinois State	W 92–86 vs. (T 1) Tulsa
		W−L (%):	1–0 (1.000)	1–0 (1.000)	1–0 (1.000)	1–0 (1.000)	1–0 (1.000)

=== CBC ===
School	Quarterfinals	Semifinals	Final
Oklahoma	W 90–86 vs. Colorado	W 82−69 vs. Baylor	L 82–89 vs. West Virginia
W–L (%):	1–0 (1.000)	1–0 (1.000)	0–1 (.000)
Total: 2–1 (.667)

Index to colors and formatting
SEC member won
SEC member lost

=== Postseason awards and honors ===
==== SEC season awards ====
SEC individual awards
Award	Recipient(s)
Player of the Year	Darius Acuff Jr., Arkansas
Coach of the Year	Todd Golden, Florida
Defensive Player of the Year	Rueben Chinyelu, Florida
Newcomer of the Year	Dailyn Swain, Texas
Freshman of the Year	Darius Acuff Jr., Arkansas
Sixth Man Award	Urban Klavzar, Florida
Scholar-Athlete of the Year	Rueben Chinyelu, Florida

2025-26 SEC Men's Basketball All-Conference Teams
First Team	Second Team	Third Team	Defensive Team	Freshman Team
Darius Acuff Jr., Arkansas; Ja'Kobi Gillespie, Tennessee; Thomas Haugh, Florida; Labaron Philon Jr., Alabama; Tyler Tanner, Vanderbilt	Nate Ament, Tennessee; Rueben Chinyelu, Florida; Mark Mitchell, Missouri; Otega Oweh, Kentucky; Dailyn Swain, Texas	Rashaun Agee, Texas A&M; Alex Condon, Florida; Keyshawn Hall, Auburn; Aden Holloway, Alabama; Josh Hubbard, Mississippi State	Rueben Chinyelu, Florida; Somto Cyril, Georgia; Felix Okpara, Tennessee; Billy Richmond III, Arkansas; Tyler Tanner, Vanderbilt	Darius Acuff Jr., Arkansas; Amari Allen, Alabama; Nate Ament, Tennessee; Malachi Moreno, Kentucky; Meleek Thomas, Arkansas

==== SEC All-Tournament Team ====
Name	Pos.	Height	Weight	Year	Team
Duke Miles	G	6'2"	188	Graduate	Vanderbilt
Tyler Tanner	G	6'0"	175	Sophomore	Vanderbilt
A.J. Storr	F	6'5"	205	Senior	Ole Miss
Darius Acuff Jr.	G	6'3"	190	Freshman	Arkansas
Trevon Brazile	F	6'10"	230	Senior	Arkansas

==== SEC Tournament Most Outstanding Player ====
Name	Pos.	Height	Weight	Year	Team
Darius Acuff Jr.	G	6'3"	190	Freshman	Arkansas

==== All-Americans ====
Consensus All-Americans
First Team	Second Team
Darius Acuff Jr.	Thomas Haugh

To earn "consensus" status, a player must win honors based on a point system computed from the four different all-America teams. The point system consists of three points for first team, two points for second team and one point for third team. No honorable mention or fourth team or lower are used in the computation. The top five totals plus ties are first team and the next five plus ties are second team.

Associated Press	NABC	Sporting News	USBWA
First Team
Darius Acuff Jr.	Darius Acuff Jr.	Darius Acuff Jr.	Darius Acuff Jr.
Second Team
	Thomas Haugh	Thomas Haugh	
Third Team
Thomas Haugh; Labaron Philon Jr.	Labaron Philon Jr.	Labaron Philon Jr.	Thomas Haugh; Labaron Philon Jr.

*Associated Press All-America Team
*National Association of Basketball Coaches All-America Team
*Sporting News All-America Team
*USBWA All-America Team

==== 2025–26 SEC season statistic leaders ====
Scoring leaders
Rk	Player	Team	PTS	PPG
1	Josh Hubbard	Mississippi State	536	21.4
2	Labaron Philon Jr.	Alabama	511	21.3
3	Darius Acuff Jr.	Arkansas	530	21.2
4	Keyshawn Hall	Auburn	475	20.7
5	Tyler Tanner	Vanderbilt	457	18.3

Rebound leaders
Rk	Player	Team	REB	RPG
1	Rueben Chinyelu	Florida	312	12.0
2	Rashaun Agee	Texas A&M	223	8.9
3	Alex Condon	Florida	203	8.1
4	Marquel Sutton	LSU	200	7.7
5	Amari Allen	Alabama	166	7.5

Field goal leaders (avg 5 fga/gm)
Rk	Player	Team	FG	FGA	PCT
1	Michael Nwoko	LSU	136	215	.633
2	Dailyn Swain	Texas	164	286	.573
3	Mark Mitchell	Missouri	146	271	.539
4	Tae Davis	Oklahoma	125	245	.510
5	Labaron Philon Jr.	Alabama	174	343	.507

Assist leaders
Rk	Player	Team	AST	APG
1	Darius Acuff Jr.	Arkansas	157	6.3
2	Ja'Kobi Gillespie	Tennessee	134	5.4
2	Tyler Tanner	Vanderbilt	134	5.4
4	Labaron Philon Jr.	Alabama	117	4.9
5	Duke Miles	Vanderbilt	77	4.3

Block leaders
Rk	Player	Team	BLK	BPG
1	Somto Cyril	Georgia	64	2.5
2	Aiden Sherrell	Alabama	57	2.4
3	Justin Abson	Georgia	42	1.8
4	Malachi Moreno	Kentucky	44	1.7
5	Trevon Brazile	40	1.7	

Free throw leaders
Rk	Player	Team	FT	FTA	PCT
1	Max Mackinnon	LSU	73	80	.912
2	Xzayvier Brown	Oklahoma	79	87	.908
3	Duke Miles	Vanderbilt	94	106	.887
4	Kevin Overton	Auburn	73	84	.869
5	Tyler Tanner	Vanderbilt	113	132	.856

Steal leaders
Rk	Player	Team	STL	SPG
1	Duke Miles	Vanderbilt	50	2.8
2	Tyler Tanner	Vanderbilt	62	2.5
3	Boogie Fland	Florida	52	2.0
4	Dailyn Swain	Texas	47	1.8
5	Jeremiah Wilkinson	Georgia	42	1.8

Three-point leaders
Rk	Player	Team	3P	3PA	%
1	Jacob Crews	Missouri	52	111	.468
2	Aden Holloway	Alabama	60	135	.444
3	Tyler Nickel	Vanderbilt	84	190	.442
4	Collin Chandler	Kentucky	56	127	.441
5	Nijel Pack	Oklahoma	80	185	.432

Through February 17, 2026

== Television selections ==
The Southeastern Conference has television contracts with ESPN and FOX, which allow games to be broadcast across ABC, ESPN, ESPN2, ESPNU, FOX, FS1 and FS2 and TNT Sports. Streaming broadcasts for games under SEC control are streamed on ESPN+. Games under the control of other conferences fall under the contracts of the opposing conference.

Team	ESPN	ESPN2	ESPNU	FOX	FS1	CBS	CBSSN	TBS	TNT	TruTV	Streaming (ESPN+/Peacock/ACCNX/FloSports)
Alabama	–	–	–	–	–	–	–	–	–	–	–
Arkansas	–	–	–	–	–	–	–	–	–	–	–
Auburn	–	–	–	–	–	–	–	–	–	–	–
Florida	–	–	–	–	–	–	–	–	–	–	–
Georgia	–	–	–	–	–	–	–	–	–	–	–
Kentucky	–	–	–	–	–	–	–	–	–	–	–
LSU	–	–	–	–	–	–	–	–	–	–	–
Mississippi State	–	–	–	–	–	–	–	–	–	–	–
Missouri	–	–	–	–	–	–	–	–	–	–	–
Oklahoma	–	–	–	–	–	–	–	–	–	–	–
Ole Miss	–	–	–	–	–	–	–	–	–	–	–
South Carolina	–	–	–	–	–	–	–	–	–	–	–
Tennessee	–	–	–	–	–	–	–	–	–	–	–
Texas	–	–	–	–	–	–	–	–	–	–	–
Texas A&M	–	–	–	–	–	–	–	–	–	–	–
Vanderbilt	–	–	–	–	–	–	–	–	–	–	–
Total	0	0	0	0	0	0	0	0	0	0	0

Platform	Games
Broadcast	0
Cable	0
Streaming	0

== 2026 NBA draft ==
The following list includes all SEC players who were drafted in the 2026 NBA draft.

PG	Point guard	SG	Shooting guard	SF	Small forward	PF	Power forward	C	Center

Player	Team	Round	Pick #	Position	School	Nationality
Darius Acuff Jr.	Sacramento Kings	1	7	PG	Arkansas	United States
Nate Ament	Miami Heat	1	13	SF	Tennessee	United States
Dailyn Swain	Chicago Bulls	1	15	SG/SF	Texas	United States
Jayden Quaintance	San Antonio Spurs	1	20	PF/C	Kentucky	United States
Labaron Philon Jr.	Philadelphia 76ers	1	22	PG	Alabama	United States
Meleek Thomas	Sacramento Kings	2	34	SG/PG	Arkansas	United States
Trevon Brazile	San Antonio Spurs	2	34	PF	Arkansas	United States
Otega Oweh	Miami Heat	2	41	SG	Kentucky	United States
Ja'Kobi Gillespie	San Antonio Spurs	2	42	PG	Tennessee	United States
Felix Okpara	Orlando Magic	2	46	C	Tennessee	Nigeria
Tyler Nickel	Phoenix Suns	2	47	SG	Vanderbilt	United States

== Home game attendance ==
Home attendance
Team	Stadium	Capacity	Game 1	Game 2	Game 3	Game 4	Game 5	Game 6	Game 7	Game 8	Game 9	Game 10	Game 11	Game 12	Game 13	Game 14	Game 15	Game 16	Game 17	Game 18	Game 19	Total	Average	% of Capacity
Alabama	Coleman Coliseum	15,383	13,474†	13,474†	13,474†	13,474†	11,256	12,626	13,474†	13,474†												104,726	13,091	85.10%
Arkansas	Bud Walton Arena	19,368	19,200†	19,200†	19,200†	19,200†	19,200†	19,200†	19,200†	19,200†	19,200†	19,200†										92,000	19,200	99.13%
Auburn	Neville Arena	9,121	**9,121†**	**9,121†**	**9,121†**	**9,121†**	**9,121†**	**9,121†**	**9,121†**	**9,121†**	**9,121†**											82,089	9,121	100.00%
Florida	O'Connell Center	11,255	10,065	10,785	10,935†	9,023	10,189	10,917	9,563	10,182	10,593											92,252	10,250	91.07%
Georgia	Stegeman Coliseum	10,523	6,187	5,595	5,706	**10,523†**	5,971	7,125	6,652	**10,523†**	7,541	10,261	**10,523†**	**10,523†**								97,130	8,094	76.92%
Kentucky	Rupp Arena	20,545	19,289	20,016	20,000	19,764	19,602	20,029	19,247	20,061†	19,706	19,085	19,725									216,524	19,684	95.81%
LSU	Pete Maravich Assembly Center	13,215	6,252	6,505	6,306	6,291	6,829	7,479	8,174	7,995	6,303	8,671	7,816	11,065†								89,686	7,474	56.56%
Missouri	Mizzou Arena	15,061	11,314	7,986	8,969	7,595	8,027	7,887	9,463	7,976	8,049	12,746†	10,196									100,208	9,110	60.49%
Mississippi State	Humphrey Coliseum	9,100	9,060	7,401	6,943	7,810	6,186	6,971	6,497	6,883	**9,212†**	**9,212†**										76,175	7,618	83.71%
Oklahoma Sooners	Lloyd Noble Center	10,967	6,476	3,269	5,765	4,746	4,410	4,646	4,866	7,040	5,866	7,922†										55,006	5,501	50.16%
Ole Miss	SJB Pavilion	9,500	8,883	8,212	8,731	4,362	7,473	9,373	8,362	8,012	7,859	**9,530†**										80,797	8,080	85.05%
South Carolina	Colonial Life Arena	18,000	12,344†	11,420	11,874	11,623	9,789	11,420	9,055	10,199	10,171	9,501	9,760	11,091	10,861							139,108	10,701	59.45%
Tennessee	Thompson–Boling Arena	21,678	18,559	18,661	17,614	17,283	17,313	**21,678†**	19,059	18,279	17,402	17,808	**21,678†**									205,334	18,667	86.11%
Texas	Moody Center	10,763	10,712	9,820	10,593	10,641	**10,802**	10,410	10,532	**10,888**	**10,823**	**11,422†**	**11,422†**	10,523								118,065	10,733	99.72%
Texas A&M	Reed Arena	12,989	7,517	6,821	9,099†	6,304	7,545	6,426	6,250	4,495	7,797	7,570	9,096									78,920	7,175	55.24%
Vanderbilt	Memorial Gymnasium	14,316	6,577	5,677	6,435	5,673	7,437	7,227	8,314	11,429	9,399	**14,316†**										82,484	8,248	57.61%
Total		13,823																				1,710,504	10,797	78.11%

Bold – At or exceed capacity
†Season high
