= Vanderbilt Commodores men's basketball statistical leaders =

The Vanderbilt Commodores men's basketball statistical leaders are individual statistical leaders of the Vanderbilt Commodores men's basketball program in various categories, including points, assists, blocks, rebounds, and steals. Within those areas, the lists identify single-game, single-season, and career leaders. The Commodores represent Vanderbilt University in the NCAA's Southeastern Conference.

Vanderbilt began competing in intercollegiate basketball in 1900. However, the school's record book does not generally list records from before the 1950s, as records from before this period are often incomplete and inconsistent. Since scoring was much lower in this era, and teams played much fewer games during a typical season, it is likely that few or no players from this era would appear on these lists anyway.

The NCAA did not officially record assists as a stat until the 1983–84 season, and blocks and steals until the 1985–86 season, but Vanderbilt's record books includes players in these stats before these seasons. These lists are updated through the end of the 2020–21 season.

== Scoring ==
Career
Rk	Player	Points	Seasons
1	Shan Foster	2,011	2004–05 2005–06 2006–07 2007–08
2	Jeffery Taylor	1,897	2008–09 2009–10 2010–11 2011–12
3	Matt Freije	1,891	2000–01 2001–02 2002–03 2003–04
4	Phil Cox	1,724	1981–82 1982–83 1983–84 1984–85
5	Ronnie McMahan	1,719	1991–92 1992–93 1993–94 1994–95
6	Mike Rhodes	1,699	1977–78 1978–79 1979–80 1980–81
7	Clyde Lee	1,691	1963–64 1964–65 1965–66
8	Drew Maddux	1,689	1994–95 1995–96 1996–97 1997–98
9	Charles Davis	1,675	1976–77 1977–78 1978–79 1979–80 1980–81
10	John Jenkins	1,660	2009–10 2010–11 2011–12

Season
Rk	Player	Points	Season
1	Scotty Pippen Jr.	736	2021–22
2	Tyler Tanner	702	2025-26
3	Billy McCaffrey	699	1992–93
4	John Jenkins	696	2011–12
5	Shan Foster	691	2007–08
6	Dan Langhi	664	1999–00
7	Billy McCaffrey	660	1993–94
8	Clyde Lee	631	1964–65
9	John Jenkins	624	2010–11
10	Tom Hagan	608	1968–69

Single game
Rk	Player	Points	Season	Opponent
1	Tom Hagan	44	1968–69	Mississippi State
2	Shan Foster	42	2007–08	Mississippi State
	Bo Wyenandt	42	1966–67	Alabama
4	Clyde Lee	41	1964–65	Kentucky
5	Jim Henry	40	1957–58	Sewanee
6	Jeff Fosnes	39	1974–75	Jacksonville
	Clyde Lee	39	1965–66	Syracuse
	John Ed Miller	39	1963–64	Duke
9	Saben Lee	38	2019–20	Alabama
	Kevin Anglin	38	1991–92	New Hampshire
	Kenny Campbell	38	1966–67	Northwestern

== Rebounds ==
Career
Rk	Player	Rebounds	Seasons
1	Clyde Lee	1,223	1963–64 1964–65 1965–66
2	Perry Wallace	894	1967–68 1968–69 1969–70
3	Bobby Thym	872	1953–54 1954–55 1955–56 1956–57
4	Bob “Snake” Grace	837	1962–63 1963–64 1964–65
5	Charley Harrison	802	1952–53 1953–54 1954–55 1955–56
6	Jeff Roberson	755	2014–15 2015–16 2016–17 2017–18
7	Jeffery Taylor	752	2008–09 2009–10 2010–11 2011–12
8	Bill Depp	747	1958–59 1959–60 1960–61
9	Will Perdue	708	1983–84 1985–86 1986–87 1987–88
10	Thorpe Weber	673	1968–69 1969–70 1970–71

Season
Rk	Player	Rebounds	Season
1	Clyde Lee	420	1964–65
2	Clyde Lee	412	1965–66
3	Clyde Lee	391	1963–64
4	Perry Wallace	350	1969–70
5	Charley Harrison	315	1955–56
6	Will Perdue	314	1987–88
7	Bill Depp	309	1960–61
8	Bob “Snake” Grace	308	1962–63
9	Charley Harrison	284	1954–55
10	Jo Gibbs	274	1956–57

Single game
Rk	Player	Rebounds	Season	Opponent
1	Clyde Lee	28	1965–66	Ole Miss

== Assists ==
Career
Rk	Player	Assists	Seasons
1	Atiba Prater	517	1996–97 1997–98 1998–99 1999–00
2	Brad Tinsley	482	2008–09 2009–10 2010–11 2011–12
3	Frank Seckar	455	1992–93 1993–94 1994–95 1995–96
4	Kevin Anglin	435	1989–90 1990–91 1991–92 1992–93
5	Jan van Breda Kolff	430	1971–72 1972–73 1973–74
6	Riley LaChance	423	2014–15 2015–16 2016–17 2017–18
	Derrick Wilcox	423	1986–87 1987–88 1988–89 1989–90
8	Jermaine Beal	421	2006–07 2007–08 2008–09 2009–10
9	Drew Maddux	394	1994–95 1995–96 1996–97 1997–98
10	Scotty Pippen Jr.	383	2019–20 2020–21 2021–22

Season
Rk	Player	Assists	Season
1	Tyler Tanner	184	2025–26
2	Atiba Prater	180	1999–00
3	Frank Seckar	176	1995–96
4	Derrick Wilcox	173	1988–89
5	Wade Baldwin IV	172	2015–16
6	Scotty Pippen Jr.	162	2021–22
7	Jermaine Beal	158	2007–08
	Derrick Wilcox	158	1989–90
8	Wade Baldwin IV	155	2014–15
	Brad Tinsley	155	2010–11
10	Atiba Prater	152	1997–98

Single game
Rk	Player	Assists	Season	Opponent
1	Billy McCaffrey	14	1992–93	Kentucky
	Tyler Tanner	14	2025–26	South Carolina

== Steals ==
Career
Rk	Player	Steals	Seasons
1	Drew Maddux	214	1994–95 1995–96 1996–97 1997–98
	Frank Seckar	214	1992–93 1993–94 1994–95 1995–96
3	Atiba Prater	211	1996–97 1997–98 1998–99 1999–00
4	James Strong	209	1996–97 1997–98 1998–99 1999–00
5	Kevin Anglin	192	1989–90 1990–91 1991–92 1992–93
6	Russell Lakey	169	2000–01 2001–02 2002–03 2003–04
7	Ronnie McMahan	157	1991–92 1992–93 1993–94 1994–95
8	Jeffery Taylor	146	2008–09 2009–10 2010–11 2011–12
9	Scotty Pippen Jr.	144	2019–20 2020–21 2021–22
10	Tyler Tanner	141	2024-25 2025–26

Season
Rk	Player	Steals	Season
1	Tyler Tanner	86	2025-26
2	James Strong	77	1998–99
3	Frank Seckar	73	1994–95
	Duke Miles	73	2025-26
5	Scotty Pippen Jr.	70	2021–22
6	Drew Maddux	68	1996–97
7	Drew Maddux	68	1997–98
8	Kevin Anglin	67	1992–93
9	Pax Whitehead	66	1996–97
10	Atiba Prater	64	1997–98

Single game
Rk	Player	Steals	Season	Opponent
1	James Strong	8	1998–99	Morehead State
	Atiba Prater	8	1997–98	Tennessee-Martin
	Frank Seckar	8	1994–95	Tennessee Tech

== Blocks ==
Career
Rk	Player	Blocks	Seasons
1	Luke Kornet	210	2013–14 2014–15 2015–16 2016–17
2	Festus Ezeli	204	2008–09 2009–10 2010–11 2011–12
3	Damian Jones	167	2013–14 2014–15 2015–16
4	Will Perdue	157	1983–84 1985–86 1986–87 1987–88
5	A.J. Ogilvy	145	2007–08 2008–09 2009–10
6	Clevon Brown	130	2016–17 2017–18 2018–19 2019–20 2020–21
7	Julian Terrell	116	2002–03 2003–04 2004–05 2005–06
8	Liam Robbins	112	2021–22 2022–23
9	Chris Woods	108	1991–92 1992–93 1993–94 1994–95
10	David Przybyszewski	75	2001–02 2002–03 2003–04 2004–05

Season
Rk	Player	Blocks	Season
1	Festus Ezeli	87	2010–11
2	Luke Kornet	84	2015–16
3	Liam Robbins	80	2022–23
4	Will Perdue	74	1987–88
5	Will Perdue	72	1986–87
6	Luke Kornet	71	2016–17
7	Damian Jones	70	2014–15
8	Damian Jones	54	2015–16
9	Festus Ezeli	52	2011–12
10	Chris Woods	50	1994–95

Single game
Rk	Player	Blocks	Season	Opponent
1	Luke Kornet	10	2015–16	Auburn
2	Liam Robbins	9	2022–23	LSU
3	Clevon Brown	8	2017–18	Ole Miss
	Clevon Brown	8	2018–19	Texas A&M
	Liam Robbins	8	2022–23	Fresno State
6	Will Perdue	7	1987–88	East Carolina
	Festus Ezeli	7	2010–11	Georgia
	Damian Jones	7	2013–14	South Carolina
	Luke Kornet	7	2016–17	Tennessee
	Liam Robbins	7	2022–23	Ole Miss
