= Rashaun Agee =

American basketball player (born 2000)

No. 13 – Cleveland Charge
- Position: Power forward
- League: NBA G League

Personal information
- Born: November 2, 2000 (age 26) Chicago, Illinois, U.S.
- Listed height: 6 ft 7 in (2.01 m)
- Listed weight: 210 lb (95 kg)

Career information
- High school: Bogan (Chicago, Illinois)
- College: New Mexico State (2020–2021); Casper College (2021–2022); Bowling Green (2022–2024); USC (2024–2025); Texas A&M (2025–2026)
- NBA draft: 2026: undrafted
- Playing career: 2026–present

Career history
- 2026–present: Cleveland Charge

Career highlights
- Second-team All-MAC (2024); Third-team All-SEC (2026)
- Stats at NBA.com
- Stats at Basketball Reference

Rashaun Agee (born November 2, 2000) is an American basketball player for the Cleveland Charge of the NBA G League. He played college basketball for the New Mexico State Aggies, Casper College, Bowling Green Falcons, USC Trojans and Texas A&M Aggies.

== High school ==
Agee attended Bogan High School in Chicago, Illinois, where he played basketball. After his junior year, Agee was named as an honorable mention to the All-City team by the Chicago Sun-Times. Agee improved his senior year, and led Bogan to the state championship, where they lost to East St. Louis Senior High School. For his performance his senior year, Agee was named to the Chicago Sun-Time first-team All-City men's basketball team and the IHSA 3A first-team men's basketball team. Agee was also tied for fifth in voting for the Illinois Mr. Basketball award, which is given to the person chosen as the best high school basketball player in Illinois.

== College career ==
After high school, Agee chose to attend New Mexico State University, where he would play college basketball. In his first year, Agee redshirted, and did not play during the year. The following year, Agee was hampered by injuries, and only appeared in one game during the season.

After two years at New Mexico State, Agee transferred to Casper College, where he would continue playing college basketball. In his sole season, Agee averaged a double-double with 20.1 points and 11.5 rebounds per game, and was named an NJCAA Division I All-American for the men's basketball team.

Agee returned to Division I men's basketball when he transferred to Bowling Green University after a year at Casper. In his first season at Bowling Green, Agee averaged 9.9 points, along with 5.7 rebounds and 1.1 blocks, which led the team on the season. Agee initially entered his name into the transfer portal after the 2022–23 season, but later opted to return to Bowling Green. On January 13, 2024, Agee scored a season-high 24 points along with registering 9 rebounds in a win against Northern Illinois. For his performance, along with a 12 points and 15 rebounds outing the previous game against Ohio, Agee was named Co-MAC Player of the Week, along with Enrique Freeman. Following the season, Agee was named to the second-team All-MAC men's basketball team.

After two years at Bowling Green, Agee transferred to the University of Southern California to continue playing college basketball. Agee started off the year slow, averaging below 5 points through mid-January. His performance first shifted on January 27, 2025, when, in a loss against UCLA, Agee scored 21 points. On March 1, Agee had a season-high 29 points in a loss against Oregon. In the first round of the Big Ten Tournament, Agee notched a double-double of 23 points and 11 rebounds in a double overtime win against Rutgers. Agee excelled in the inaugural College Basketball Crown tournament, scoring 27 points in USC's 1st round win against Tulane, and following that up with 22 points in the team's 2nd round loss against Villanova.

Following his sole year at USC, Agee transferred to Texas A&M University for his final year of college basketball. Before the season, Agee received a temporary restraining order by a Brazos County judge that allowed Agee to play another season amidst the NCAA previously denying Agee a waiver for an additional season. On December 2, 2025, Agee scored 21 points and logged 13 rebounds in a win against Pittsburgh as a part of the ACC–SEC Challenge. Agee scored 23 points on January 21 in a win against Mississippi State. Following an 18 points and 15 rebounds outing in a win against Georgia, Agee was named Co-SEC Player of the Week, along with Alex Condon. On March 7, Agee scored a season-high 26 points in a triple-overtime win against LSU. The following game, in a loss against Oklahoma in the 1st round of the SEC tournament, Agee recorded his thirteenth double-double of the season, with 13 points and 10 rebounds, which set the Texas A&M record for most double-doubles in a season. In the 1st round of the 2026 NCAA Tournament, Agee scored 22 points in a win against Saint Mary's. For his performance on the season, Agee was named to the third-team All-SEC men's basketball team.

== Professional career ==
After going undrafted in the 2026 NBA draft, Agee signed an Exhibit 10 deal with the Cleveland Cavaliers. He ended up with their G League affiliate, the Cleveland Charge.

== Career statistics ==
Legend
GP	Games played	GS	Games started	MPG	Minutes per game
FG%	Field goal percentage	3P%	3-point field goal percentage	FT%	Free throw percentage
RPG	Rebounds per game	APG	Assists per game	SPG	Steals per game
BPG	Blocks per game	PPG	Points per game	**Bold**	Career high

=== College ===
Year	Team	GP	GS	MPG	FG%	3P%	FT%	RPG	APG	SPG	BPG	PPG
2019–20	New Mexico State	Redshirt										
2020–21	New Mexico State	1	0	7.0	.500	.000	.000	1.0	1.0	**1.0**	.0	2.0
2022–23	Bowling Green	30	4	18.2	.528	.240	.571	5.7	.7	.6	**1.1**	9.9
2023–24	Bowling Green	33	30	27.5	**.570**	.231	.680	**9.9**	1.6	.9	.8	13.3
2024–25	USC	**34**	10	20.1	.550	**.391**	.741	4.5	1.0	.9	.8	9.4
2025–26	Texas A&M	**34**	**33**	26.7	.493	.264	**.750**	8.7	**2.4**	.9	.8	**14.6**
Career		132	77	23.1	.532	.303	.690	7.2	1.4	.8	.8	11.8
