= Amari Allen =

American basketball player (born 2006)

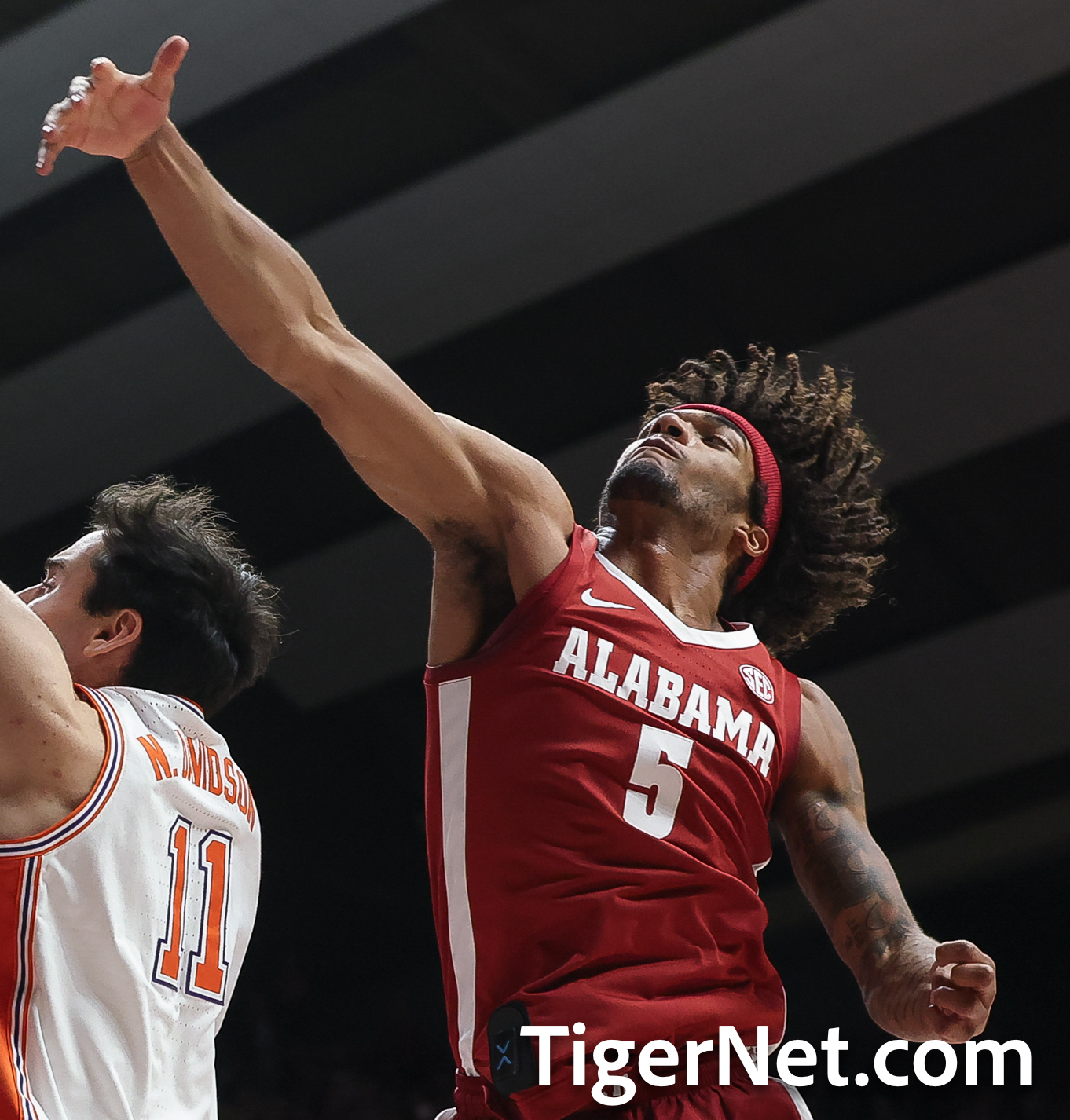

No. 5 – Alabama Crimson Tide
- Position: Small forward
- League: Southeastern Conference

Personal information
- Born: January 26, 2006 (age 20) Green Bay, Wisconsin, U.S.
- Listed height: 6 ft 6 in (1.98 m)
- Listed weight: 215 lb (98 kg)

Career information
- High school: Kaukauna (Kaukauna, Wisconsin); IMG Academy (Bradenton, Florida); Ashwaunenon (Ashwaubenon, Wisconsin)
- College: Alabama (2025–present)

Career highlights
- SEC All-Freshman Team (2026)

Amari Allen (born January 26, 2006) is an American college basketball player for the Alabama Crimson Tide of the Southeastern Conference (SEC).

== Early life and high school ==
Allen grew up in Green Bay, Wisconsin and initially attended Kaukauna High School in Kaukauna, Wisconsin. He transferred to IMG Academy in Bradenton, Florida after his freshman year. Allen moved back to Wisconsin after his junior year and enrolled at Ashwaubenon High School. He was named the Wisconsin Gatorade Player of the Year in his only season at Ashwaubenon after averaging 34.1 points, 11.5 rebounds, 8.5 assists, and 2.6 steals per game. Allen was rated a four-star recruit and committed to play college basketball at Alabama over offers from Cincinnati, Missouri, Ohio State, and Wisconsin.

== College career ==
Allen entered his freshman season at Alabama coming off the bench as part of the Crimson Tide's main playing rotation. He made his first career start on December 3, 2025, against Clemson and scored 20 points with 11 rebounds and four assists in a 90-84 win.
