= Nate Ament =

American basketball player (born 2006)

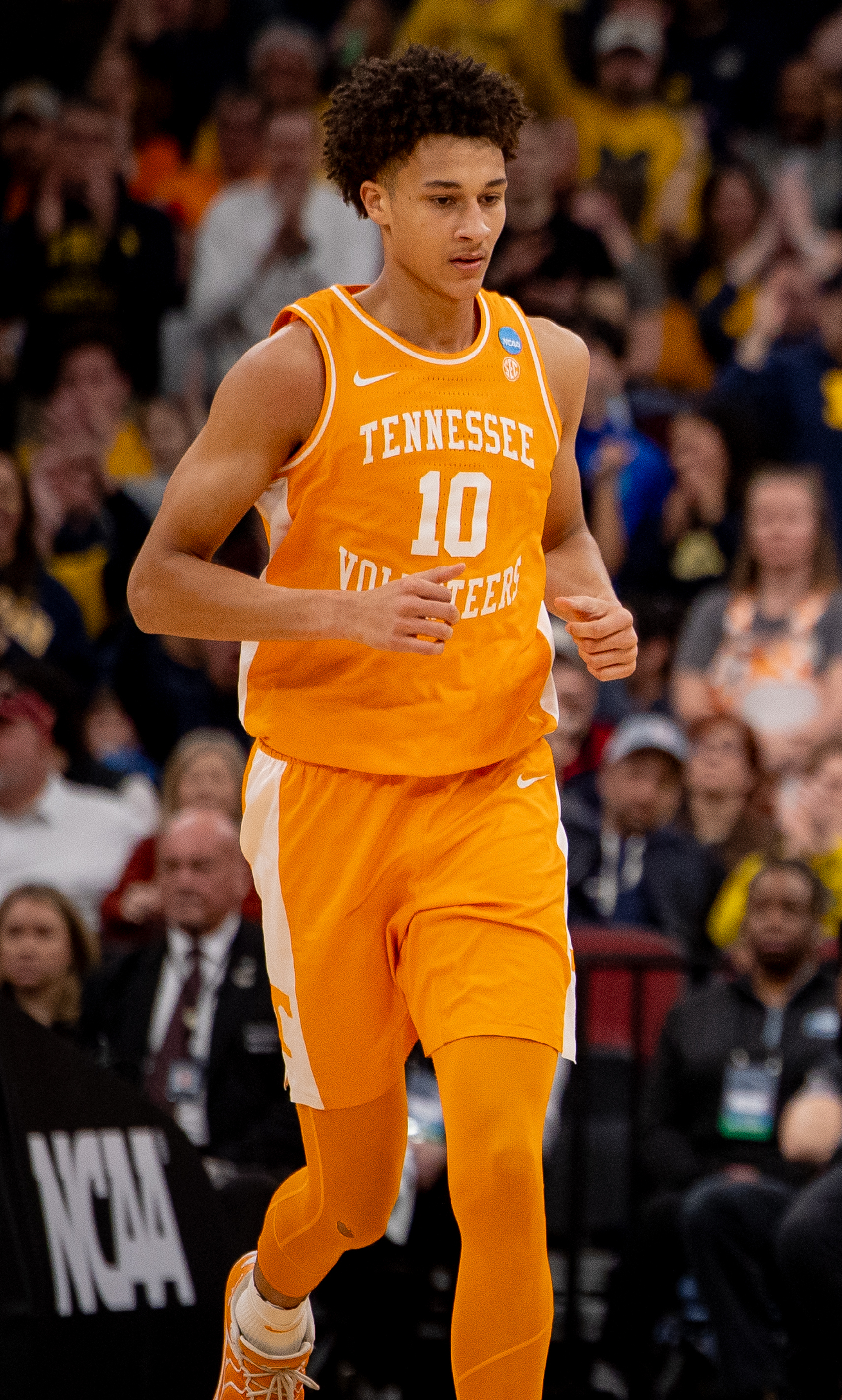
- Ament with the Tennessee Volunteers in 2026

No. 15 – Milwaukee Bucks
- Position: Power forward / small forward
- League: NBA

Personal information
- Born: December 10, 2006 (age 19) Woodbridge, Virginia, U.S.
- Listed height: 6 ft 10 in (2.08 m)
- Listed weight: 207 lb (94 kg)

Career information
- High school: Colgan (Manassas, Virginia); Highland School (Warrenton, Virginia)
- College: Tennessee (2025–2026)
- NBA draft: 2026: 1st round, 13th overall pick
- Drafted by: Miami Heat
- Playing career: 2026–present

Career history
- 2026–present: Milwaukee Bucks

Career highlights
- Second-team All-SEC (2026); SEC All-Freshman Team (2026); McDonald's All-American (2025); Jordan Brand Classic (2025); Nike Hoop Summit (2025)
- Stats at NBA.com
- Stats at Basketball Reference
Medals
Men's basketball
Representing United States
FIBA Under-18 AmeriCup
Gold medal – first place	2024 Argentina	Team

Nathaniel Herman Ament (born December 10, 2006) is an American basketball player for the Milwaukee Bucks of the National Basketball Association (NBA). He played college basketball for the Tennessee Volunteers. He was a consensus five-star recruit and one of the top players in the 2025 class. He holds Italian citizenship through his mother.

== Early life and high school career ==
Ament grew up in Manassas, Virginia and initially attended Colgan High School. He played as a reserve on the varsity basketball team during his freshman season and scored 53 total points. He averaged 18.2 points and nine rebounds per game as a sophomore. After his sophomore year Ament transferred to the Highland School in Warrenton, Virginia. He averaged 19.3 points, 7.8 rebounds, four blocks and 3.7 assists per game in his first season at Highland. During his senior year, he signed a shoe deal with Reebok. Ament was named the 2024–25 Virginia boys' basketball Gatorade Player of the Year. Ament was selected to play in the 2025 McDonald's All-American Boys Game.

=== Recruiting ===
Ament was a consensus five-star recruit and one of the top players in the 2025 class, according to major recruiting services. On April 20, 2025, Ament committed to playing college basketball for Tennessee over Duke, Kentucky, Arkansas and Louisville.

College recruiting
Name	Hometown	School	Height	Weight	Commit date
Nate Ament; PF	Manassas, VA	Highland School (VA)	6 ft 9 in (2.06 m)	215 lb (98 kg)	Apr 20, 2025
Nate Ament; PF	Recruit ratings: Rivals: 247Sports: On3: ESPN: (97)				
Overall recruit ranking: Rivals: 4 247Sports: 4 On3: 4 ESPN: 4
Note: In many cases, Scout, Rivals, 247Sports, On3, and ESPN may conflict in their listings of height and weight.; In these cases, the average was taken. ESPN grades are on a 100-point scale.; Sources: "2025 Tennessee Basketball Commitment List". Rivals.; "2025 Tennessee Volunteers Recruiting Class". ESPN.; "2025 Team Ranking". Rivals.; "Tennessee 2025 Basketball Commits". 247Sports.

== College career ==
Ament averaged 16.7 points and 6.3 rebounds per game as a freshman, helping Tennessee reach the Elite Eight of the NCAA tournament. He was named to the Second Team All-SEC. Following the season, he declared for the 2026 NBA draft.

== Professional career ==
On June 23, 2026, Ament was selected with the thirteenth overall pick by the Miami Heat in the 2026 NBA draft. On July 6, 2026, his draft rights, alongside Tyler Herro, Jaime Jaquez Jr., Kasparas Jakučionis, Kel'el Ware, and four more future draft picks, were traded to the Milwaukee Bucks in exchange for Giannis Antetokounmpo and Bobby Portis.

== National team career ==
Ament played for the United States under-18 basketball team at the 2024 FIBA U18 AmeriCup. He averaged 3.7 points and 1.5 rebounds per game as the United States won the gold medal.

== Personal life ==
Ament's father, Albert, played college basketball at Wayne State. His mother, Godelive, is a native of Rwanda and met Albert while he was working for Catholic Relief Services and both were taking part in relief efforts in the aftermath of the genocide against Tutsis in Rwanda. His mother lived in Italy, where she was adopted and became an Italian citizen.

Since 2025, Ament has been in a relationship with Jazzy Davidson, who plays collegiate basketball for the USC Trojans.

Ament is a Christian. He has worn the jersey number 10 as a nod to the Bible verse Isaiah 41:10. He has said, "To be able to lean on your faith in times of trouble and knowing that—win or lose, good performance or bad performance—Jesus is always going to be here with me kind of just allows me to play more free, more confident. Just trusting in God and not leaning on my own understanding."

== Career statistics ==
Legend
GP	Games played	GS	Games started	MPG	Minutes per game
FG%	Field goal percentage	3P%	3-point field goal percentage	FT%	Free throw percentage
RPG	Rebounds per game	APG	Assists per game	SPG	Steals per game
BPG	Blocks per game	PPG	Points per game	**Bold**	Career high

=== College ===
Year	Team	GP	GS	MPG	FG%	3P%	FT%	RPG	APG	SPG	BPG	PPG
2025–26	Tennessee	35	35	29.7	.399	.333	.790	6.3	2.3	1.0	.6	16.7
