= Meleek Thomas =

American basketball player (born 2006)

No. 15 – Cleveland Cavaliers
- Position: Shooting guard / point guard
- Conference: NBA

Personal information
- Born: August 6, 2006 (age 20) Pittsburgh, Pennsylvania, U.S.
- Listed height: 6 ft 3 in (1.91 m)
- Listed weight: 190 lb (86 kg)

Career information
- High school: Lincoln Park Performing Arts (Midland, Pennsylvania); Overtime Elite Academy (Atlanta, Georgia)
- College: Arkansas (2025–2026)
- NBA draft: 2026: 2nd round, 34th overall pick
- Drafted by: Sacramento Kings
- Playing career: 2026–present

Career history
- 2026–present: Cleveland Cavaliers

Career highlights
- SEC All-Freshman Team (2026); McDonald's All-American (2025)
- Stats at NBA.com
- Stats at Basketball Reference

Meleek Aker Jones Thomas (born August 6, 2006) is an American basketball player for the Cleveland Cavaliers of the National Basketball Association (NBA). He played college basketball for the Arkansas Razorbacks.

== Early life and high school ==
Thomas was born in Pittsburgh, Pennsylvania. He moved with his family to Charlotte, North Carolina, when he was ten before moving back to Pittsburgh four years later. In middle school, Thomas went to school and played basketball in the North Hills School District. Thomas then attended Lincoln Park Performing Arts Charter School. He averaged 23.5 points, 10.8 rebounds, 5.8 assists, and 3.3 steals per game during his junior season as Lincoln Park won its second straight PIAA state championship. Thomas scored 1,750 points in three years at Lincoln Park.

After his junior year, Thomas opted to leave Lincoln Park to join the Overtime Elite league as a non-professional player for team City Reapers in order to preserve his collegiate eligibility.

Thomas was a consensus five-star recruit and one of the top players in the 2025 class, according to major recruiting services. He committed to play college basketball at Arkansas over offers from Pittsburgh and UConn.

== College career ==
Thomas enrolled at the University of Arkansas in July 2025 to take part in the Razorbacks' summer practices. He averaged 15.6 points, 3.8 rebounds and 2.5 assists per game as a freshman on 43.5% shooting from the field. Following the season, Thomas declared for the 2026 NBA draft.

== Professional career ==
On June 24, 2026, Thomas was selected with the 34th overall pick by the Sacramento Kings but was subsequently traded to the Cleveland Cavaliers with a future second round pick for pick 29 (Alex Karaban).

== Personal life ==
Thomas's older brother, Shawndale Jones, played college basketball at NJIT and Indiana University of Pennsylvania.
