= Darius Acuff Jr. =

American basketball player (born 2006)

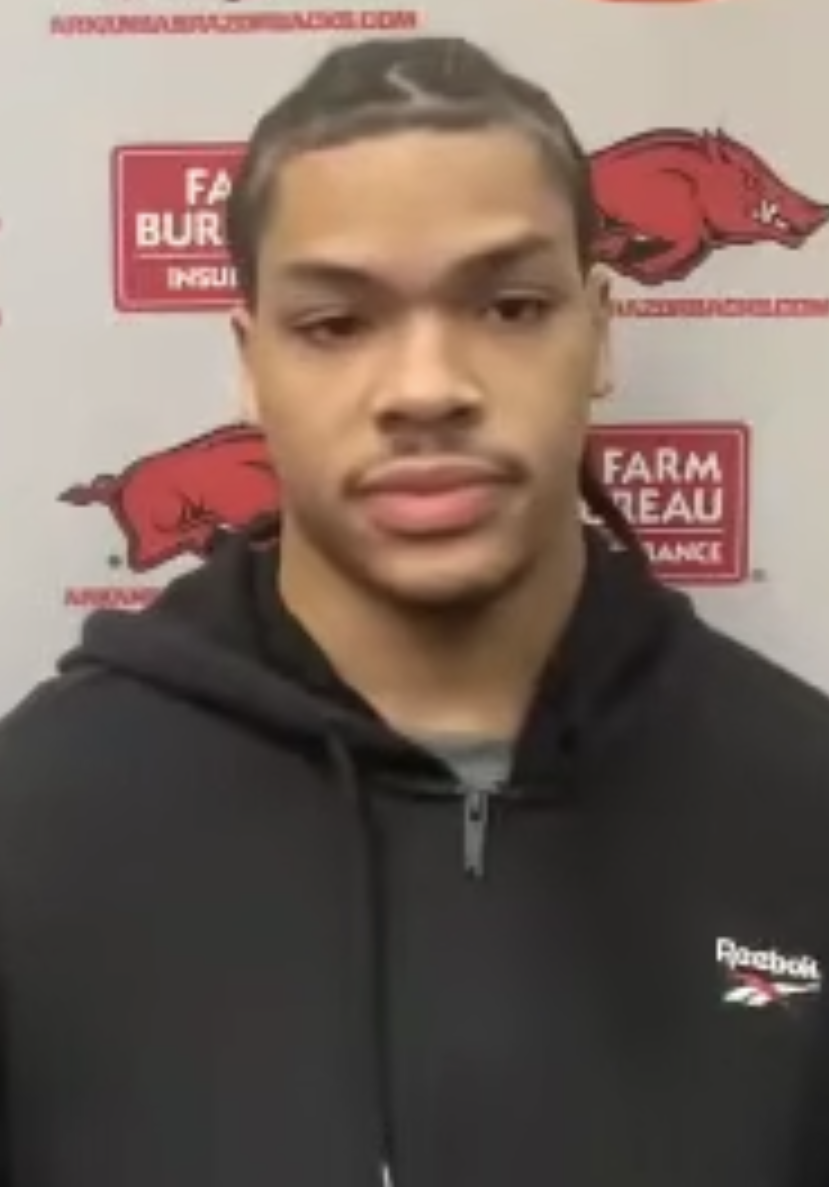
- Acuff in 2025

No. 5 – Sacramento Kings
- Position: Point guard
- League: NBA

Personal information
- Born: November 16, 2006 (age 20) Detroit, Michigan, U.S.
- Listed height: 6 ft 2 in (1.88 m)
- Listed weight: 190 lb (86 kg)

Career information
- High school: Cass Tech (Detroit, Michigan); IMG Academy (Bradenton, Florida)
- College: Arkansas (2025–2026)
- NBA draft: 2026: 1st round, 7th overall pick
- Drafted by: Sacramento Kings
- Playing career: 2026–present

Career history
- 2026–present: Sacramento Kings

Career highlights
- Consensus first-team All-American (2026); Bob Cousy Award (2026); SEC Player of the Year (2026); SEC Rookie of the Year (2026); First-team All-SEC (2026); SEC All-Freshman Team (2026); SEC tournament MVP (2026); McDonald's All-American (2025); Jordan Brand Classic (2025); Nike Hoop Summit (2025); FIBA Under-18 AmeriCup MVP (2024)
- Stats at NBA.com
- Stats at Basketball Reference
Medals
Men's basketball
Representing the United States
FIBA Under-18 AmeriCup
Gold medal – first place	2024 Buenos Aires	Team

Darius Eugene Acuff Jr. (born November 16, 2006) is an American basketball player for the Sacramento Kings of the National Basketball Association (NBA). He played college basketball for the Arkansas Razorbacks. He was a consensus five-star recruit and one of the top players in the 2025 class.

== Early life and high school career ==
Acuff was born and raised in Detroit, Michigan. His father, Darius Acuff Sr., played for the Eastern Kentucky Colonels men's basketball team.

Acuff first attended Cass Technical High School. As a freshman, he was a 2022 Associated Press (AP) all-state honorable mention. As a sophomore, he averaged 21.4 points and 5.7 assists per game, leading Cass Tech to a state championship. In 2023, he earned AP first-team all-state recognition and was the first sophomore to ever be named Mr. PSL for his play in the Detroit Public School League. Acuff transferred to IMG Academy in Bradenton, Florida after his sophomore year.

=== Recruiting ===
Acuff was a consensus five-star recruit in the 2025 class, according to major recruiting boards. On July 26, 2024, he committed to play college basketball for John Calipari and Arkansas, choosing from a final list that also included Kansas and Michigan.

College recruiting
Name	Hometown	School	Height	Weight	Commit date
Darius Acuff Jr. PG	Detroit, MI	IMG Academy (FL)	6 ft 2 in (1.88 m)	180 lb (82 kg)	Jul 26, 2024
Darius Acuff Jr. PG	Recruit ratings: Rivals: 247Sports: On3: ESPN: (95)				
Overall recruit ranking: Rivals: 13 247Sports: 5 On3: 21 ESPN: 7
Note: In many cases, Scout, Rivals, 247Sports, On3, and ESPN may conflict in their listings of height and weight.; In these cases, the average was taken. ESPN grades are on a 100-point scale.; Sources: "Arkansas 2025 Basketball Commitments". Rivals.; "2025 Arkansas Razorbacks Recruiting Class". ESPN.; "2025 Team Ranking". Rivals.

== College career ==
As a freshman with the Arkansas Razorbacks, Acuff led Arkansas to a 28–9 overall record, a second-place regular-season finish in the SEC, and a 2026 SEC men's basketball tournament championship. Averaging 23.0 points per game and 6.6 assists per game, both marks that led the SEC, Acuff earned numerous conference and national awards. Acuff was named SEC Player of the Year, SEC Rookie of the Year, SEC Tournament MVP and an AP All-American 1st team selection. In the 2026 NCAA tournament, he led the Razorbacks to the Sweet 16 with victories over Hawaii and High Point. On April 5, 2026, Acuff won the Bob Cousy Award, which is given to the best point guard in the nation, becoming the first Arkansas player to win the award, and the first freshman. Acuff was also a finalist for the Naismith Award. On April 22, 2026, Acuff announced he would be entering the 2026 NBA draft.

== Professional career ==
On June 23, 2026, Acuff was selected with the seventh overall pick by the Sacramento Kings in the 2026 NBA draft.

On October 21, Acuff made his NBA regular season debut, putting up 12 points in a 121–96 loss to the Los Angeles Clippers. On October 23, Acuff put up a then career-high 33 points in a 128–120 loss to the Portland Trail Blazers. On October 29, Acuff put up a then career-high 34 points and a career-high 14 assists, in a 132–120 loss to the New Orleans Pelicans. On October 31, Acuff put up a career-high 38 points with a career-high nine three-pointers made in a 136–105 loss to the Memphis Grizzlies. The nine made three-pointers also set the record for the most made three-pointers in a game by a teenager in the NBA. He also became the youngest player in Kings franchise history to record consecutive 30-point games at 19 years and 349 days old, surpassing the previous record set by Oscar Robertson at 21 years and 357 days old.

== National team career ==
Acuff played for the United States under-18 basketball team at the 2024 FIBA Under-18 AmeriCup. He averaged 17.8 points, 4.7 rebounds and four assists per game and was named the tournament MVP as the United States won the gold medal.

== Career statistics ==
Legend
GP	Games played	GS	Games started	MPG	Minutes per game
FG%	Field goal percentage	3P%	3-point field goal percentage	FT%	Free throw percentage
RPG	Rebounds per game	APG	Assists per game	SPG	Steals per game
BPG	Blocks per game	PPG	Points per game	**Bold**	Career high

=== College ===
Year	Team	GP	GS	MPG	FG%	3P%	FT%	RPG	APG	SPG	BPG	PPG
2025–26	Arkansas	36	36	35.1	.484	.440	.809	3.1	6.4	.8	.3	23.5
