= 2026 SEC men's basketball tournament =

American college basketball postseason tournament

- Classification: Division I
- Season: 2025–26
- Teams: 16
- Site: Bridgestone Arena; Nashville, Tennessee
- Champions: Arkansas (2nd title)
- Winning coach: John Calipari (7th title)
- MVP: Darius Acuff Jr. (Arkansas)
- Television: SEC Network, ESPN

2025–26 Southeastern Conference men's basketball standings
	Conf.				Overall
Team	W		L	PCT	W		L	PCT
No. 9 Florida	16	–	2	.889	27	–	8	.771
No. 16 Alabama	13	–	5	.722	25	–	10	.714
No. 13 Arkansas †	13	–	5	.722	28	–	9	.757
No. 19 Vanderbilt	11	–	7	.611	27	–	9	.750
No. 12 Tennessee	11	–	7	.611	25	–	12	.676
Texas A&M	11	–	7	.611	22	–	12	.647
Georgia	10	–	8	.556	22	–	11	.667
Missouri	10	–	8	.556	20	–	13	.606
Kentucky	10	–	8	.556	22	–	14	.611
No. 22 Texas	9	–	9	.500	21	–	15	.583
Oklahoma	7	–	11	.389	21	–	16	.568
Auburn	7	–	11	.389	22	–	16	.579
Mississippi State	5	–	13	.278	13	–	19	.406
South Carolina	4	–	14	.222	13	–	19	.406
Ole Miss	4	–	14	.222	15	–	20	.429
LSU	3	–	15	.167	15	–	17	.469
† 2026 SEC tournament winner Rankings from AP poll

The 2026 SEC men's basketball tournament was the postseason men's basketball tournament for the 2025–26 season for the Southeastern Conference (SEC). The tournament was held from March 11–15, 2026 at Bridgestone Arena in Nashville, Tennessee. The winner, Arkansas, received the conference's automatic bid to the 2026 NCAA tournament.

== Seeds ==
All 16 members of the SEC participated in the tournament. The top eight seeds earned a bye to the second round, with the top four seeds earning a double bye to the quarterfinals. Ties were broken by head-to-head results, results vs. the top-seed and going on down until the tie is broken, and finally a coin toss (or a drawing of lots if three or more teams are involved).

Seed	School	Conference record	Tiebreaker 1	Tiebreaker 2
1	Florida	16–2		
2	Alabama	13–5	1–0 vs. Arkansas	
3	Arkansas	13–5	0–1 vs. Alabama	
4	Vanderbilt	11–7	2–1 vs. Tennessee/Texas A&M	1–0 vs. Alabama
5	Tennessee	11–7	2–1 vs. Vanderbilt/Texas A&M	1–1 vs. Alabama
6	Texas A&M	11–7	0–2 vs. Vanderbilt/Tennessee	
7	Georgia	10–8	2–0 vs. Missouri/Kentucky	
8	Missouri	10–8	1–1 vs. Georgia/Kentucky	
9	Kentucky	10–8	0–2 vs. Georgia/Missouri	
10	Texas	9–9		
11	Oklahoma	7–11	1–0 vs. Auburn	
12	Auburn	7–11	0–1 vs. Oklahoma	
13	Mississippi State	5–13		
14	South Carolina	4–14	1–0 vs. Ole Miss	
15	Ole Miss	4–14	0–1 vs. South Carolina	
16	LSU	3–15		

== Schedule ==
Game	Time	Matchup	Score	Television	Attendance
First round – Wednesday, March 11
1	11:30 a.m.	No. 9 Kentucky vs. No. 16 LSU	87–82	SECN	12,722
2	2:00 p.m.	No. 12 Auburn vs. No. 13 Mississippi State	79–61	SECN	12,722
3	6:00 p.m.	No. 10 Texas vs. No. 15 Ole Miss	66–76	SECN	10,701
4	8:30 p.m.	No. 11 Oklahoma vs. No. 14 South Carolina	86–74	SECN	10,701
Second round – Thursday, March 12
5	11:30 a.m.	No. 8 Missouri vs. No. 9 Kentucky	72–78	SECN	15,719
6	2:00 p.m.	No. 5 Tennessee vs. No. 12 Auburn	72–62	SECN	15,719
7	6:00 p.m.	No. 7 Georgia vs. No. 15 Ole Miss	72–76	SECN	11,457
8	8:30 p.m.	No. 6 Texas A&M vs. No. 11 Oklahoma	63–83	SECN	11,457
Quarterfinals – Friday, March 13
9	12:00 p.m.	No. 1 Florida vs. No. 9 Kentucky	71–63	ESPN	17,864
10	2:30 p.m.	No. 4 Vanderbilt vs. No. 5 Tennessee	75–68	ESPN	17,864
11	6:00 p.m.	No. 2 Alabama vs. No. 15 Ole Miss	79–80	SECN	15,085
12	8:30 p.m.	No. 3 Arkansas vs. No. 11 Oklahoma	82–79	SECN	15,085
Semifinals – Saturday, March 14
13	12:00 p.m.	No. 1 Florida vs. No. 4 Vanderbilt	74–91	ESPN	16,612
14	2:30 p.m.	No. 3 Arkansas vs. No. 15 Ole Miss	93–90^{OT}	ESPN	16,612
Championship – Sunday, March 15
15	12:00 p.m.	No. 3 Arkansas vs. No. 4 Vanderbilt	86–75	ESPN	18,377
Game times in CT. Rankings denote tournament seeding.

== Bracket ==
First round Wednesday, March 11; SECN
9	Kentucky	87
16	LSU	82
12	Auburn	79
13	Mississippi State	61
10	Texas	66
15	Ole Miss	76
11	Oklahoma	86
14	South Carolina	74

Second round Thursday, March 12; SECN
8	Missouri	72
9	Kentucky	78
5	Tennessee	72
12	Auburn	62
7	Georgia	72
15	Ole Miss	76
6	Texas A&M	63
11	Oklahoma	83

Quarterfinals; Friday, March 13; ESPN/SECN
1	Florida	71
9	Kentucky	63
4	Vanderbilt	75
5	Tennessee	68
2	Alabama	79
15	Ole Miss	80
3	Arkansas	82
11	Oklahoma	79

Semifinals; Saturday, March 14; ESPN
1	Florida	74
4	Vanderbilt	91
15	Ole Miss	90
3	Arkansas	93*

Championship; Sunday, March 15; ESPN
4	Vanderbilt	75
3	Arkansas	86

* denotes overtime period

== Awards and Honors ==
=== All-Tournament Team ===
Player	Team
**Darius Acuff Jr.**	Arkansas
Trevon Brazile	Arkansas
AJ Storr	Ole Miss
Duke Miles	Vanderbilt
Tyler Tanner	Vanderbilt

MVP in bold
