= 2025 McDonald's All-American Boys Game =

American high school basketball game

West	East
105	92
	1st half	2nd half	Total
West	48	57	105
East	40	52	92
- Date: April 1, 2025
- Venue: Barclays Center, Brooklyn, New York
- MVP: Darryn Peterson and Cameron Boozer
- Network: ESPN

McDonald's All-American

The 2025 McDonald's All-American Boys Game was an all-star basketball game played on April 1, 2025, at the Barclays Center in Brooklyn, New York. The game's rosters featured the best and most highly-recruited high school boys graduating in the class of 2025. The game was the 48th annual version of the McDonald's All-American Game first played in 1977. The 24 players were selected from over 700 nominees by a committee of basketball experts. They were chosen not only for their on-court skills, but for their performances off the court as well.

== Rosters ==
The roster was announced on January 27, 2025. The Duke Blue Devils and UConn Huskies had the most selections with three. At the announcement of the roster selections, 14 schools were represented while Nate Ament, Alijah Arenas, Brayden Burries, and Koa Peat were uncommitted. Arenas committed to USC on January 30, 2025. Both Peat and Burries committed to Arizona after the game was played.

=== Team East ===
ESPN 100 Rank	Name	Height (ft–in)	Weight (lb)	Position	Hometown	High school	College choice
24	Shon Abaev	6–7	195	F	Miami, FL	Calvary Christian Academy	Cincinnati
5	Darius Acuff Jr.	6–2	175	G	Detroit, MI	IMG Academy	Arkansas
27	Darius Adams	6–5	175	G	Manchester Township, NJ	La Lumiere School	Maryland
4	Nate Ament	6–9	185	F	Manassas, VA	Highland School	Tennessee
3	Cameron Boozer	6–9	245	F	Miami, FL	Christopher Columbus High School	Duke
16	Cayden Boozer	6–4	205	G	Miami, FL	Christopher Columbus High School	Duke
19	Jalen Haralson	6–7	215	F	Anderson, IN	La Lumiere School	Notre Dame
13	Isiah Harwell	6–6	210	G	Pocatello, ID	Wasatch Academy	Houston
18	Trey McKenney	6–4	225	F	Flint, MI	St. Mary's Preparatory	Michigan
23	Malachi Moreno	6–10	225	C	Georgetown, KY	Great Crossing High School	Kentucky
14	Braylon Mullins	6–4	190	G	Greenfield, IN	Greenfield Central High School	UConn
22	Eric Reibe	7–0	215	C	Hanover, Germany	Bullis School	UConn

Note: *

=== Team West ===
ESPN 100 Rank	Name	Height (ft–in)	Weight (lb)	Position	Hometown	High school	College choice
12	Alijah Arenas^	6–6	200	G	Woodland Hills, CA	Chatsworth High School	USC
8	Mikel Brown Jr.	6–3	175	G	Orlando, FL	DME Academy	Louisville
28	Niko Bundalo	6–10	210	F	Canton, OH	Prolific Prep	Ole Miss
11	Brayden Burries^	6–4	185	G	San Bernardino, CA	Eleanor Roosevelt High School	Arizona
6	Chris Cenac	6–10	230	C	New Orleans, LA	Link Academy	Houston
1	AJ Dybantsa	6–9	200	F	Brockton, MA	Utah Prep	BYU
21	Nikolas Khamenia	6–8	215	F	Los Angeles, CA	Harvard-Westlake School	Duke
9	Koa Peat^	6–7	235	F	Gilbert, AZ	Perry High School	Arizona
2	Darryn Peterson	6–6	185	G	Canton, OH	Prolific Prep	Kansas
10	Meleek Thomas	6–4	180	G	Pittsburgh, PA	Overtime Elite	Arkansas
7	Caleb Wilson	6–9	205	F	Atlanta, GA	Holy Innocents' Episcopal School	North Carolina
15	Tounde Yessoufou	6–5	215	F	Cotonou, Benin	Saint Joseph High School	Baylor

^undecided at the time of roster selection
~undecided at game time
†decommitted from original school before game was played
‡decommitted from school after game was played

== Box Score ==
ESPN

April 2, 2025
09:30 pm ET

Box Score

East	92–105	West
Scoring by quarter: 24–21, 16–27, 30–26, 22–31
Pts: Tied, 16; Rebs: Cameron Boozer, 12; Asts: Tied, 4		Pts: Darryn Peterson, 18; Rebs: Tied, 7 Asts: Mikel Brown Jr., 5

Barclays Center, Brooklyn, New York
