= Malachi Moreno =

American basketball player (born 2006)

No. 24 – Kentucky Wildcats
- Position: Center
- League: Southeastern Conference

Personal information
- Born: October 24, 2006 (age 20)
- Listed height: 7 ft 0 in (2.13 m)
- Listed weight: 250 lb (113 kg)

Career information
- High school: Great Crossing (Georgetown, Kentucky)
- College: Kentucky (2025–present)

Career highlights
- SEC All-Freshman Team (2026); McDonald's All-American (2025); Nike Hoop Summit (2025); Kentucky Mr. Basketball (2025)

Malachi Luis Moreno (born October 24, 2006) is an American college basketball player for the Kentucky Wildcats of the Southeastern Conference (SEC). He was a consensus four-star recruit and one of the top players in the 2025 class.

== High school career ==
Moreno attended Great Crossing High School in Georgetown, Kentucky, where he was a 4-star center. As a freshman at Great Crossing in 2022, he averaged 11.9 points per game to go along with 12 rebounds per game in 34 games played. He improved in his sophomore year, bumping up his points per game to 14.8. As a senior in his final year at Great Crossing, he averaged 21.5 points per game to go along with 14.9 rebounds per game, leading Great Crossing to its first-ever KHSAA title in program history. He was named the KHSAA Sweet 16 MVP. for his efforts.

In January 2025, Moreno was named a McDonald's All-American playing for Team East.

=== Recruiting ===
Moreno was a consensus four-star recruit and one of the top players in the 2025 class, according to major recruiting services. On August 16, 2024, he committed to playing college basketball for Kentucky over offers from Indiana, Ohio State, and North Carolina. Coach Mark Pope stated that Moreno is an "elite-level passer with incredible tracking vision," and that "He has a ferocity around the rim in terms of ball protection and he is willing to engage physically."

College recruiting
Name	Hometown	School	Height	Weight	Commit date
Malachi Moreno; C	Georgetown, KY	Great Crossing (KY)	6 ft 11 in (2.11 m)	230 lb (100 kg)	Aug 16, 2024
Malachi Moreno; C	Recruit ratings: Rivals: 247Sports: On3: ESPN: (88)				
Overall recruit ranking: Rivals: 27 247Sports: 27 On3: 24 ESPN: 26
Note: In many cases, Scout, Rivals, 247Sports, On3, and ESPN may conflict in their listings of height and weight.; In these cases, the average was taken. ESPN grades are on a 100-point scale.; Sources: "Kentucky 2025 Basketball Commitments". Rivals.; "2025 Kentucky Wildcats Recruiting Class". ESPN.; "2025 Team Ranking". Rivals.

== College career ==
Moreno joined the University of Kentucky as a member of the Kentucky Wildcats men's basketball program for the 2025–26 season. As a freshman, he appeared in 36 games and became a key contributor in the frontcourt rotation under head coach Mark Pope.

He averaged 7.8 points, 6.3 rebounds, 1.8 assists, and 1.5 blocks per game while shooting 58.2% from the field. His production included multiple double-digit scoring and rebounding performances, highlighted by an 18-point game against Valparaiso and an 11-rebound outing against South Carolina.

Moreno earned All-SEC Freshman Team honors following the season, recognizing his impact as one of the conference's top first-year players. He also recorded a standout all-around performance against Mississippi State on January 10, 2026, with 17 points, eight rebounds, six assists, and four steals in a single game.

At the conclusion of the season, Moreno declared for the 2026 NBA draft while maintaining his college eligibility, allowing him the option to return to Kentucky.

== Career statistics ==
Legend
GP	Games played	GS	Games started	MPG	Minutes per game
FG%	Field goal percentage	3P%	3-point field goal percentage	FT%	Free throw percentage
RPG	Rebounds per game	APG	Assists per game	SPG	Steals per game
BPG	Blocks per game	PPG	Points per game	**Bold**	Career high

=== College ===
Year	Team	GP	GS	MPG	FG%	3P%	FT%	RPG	APG	SPG	BPG	PPG
2025–26	Kentucky	36	30	22.6	.582	.000	.698	6.3	1.8	.5	1.5	7.8

== Personal life ==
Moreno is the son of Sarah and Enelio Moreno. Moreno has an older brother, named Michael, who also played Division I basketball at Eastern Kentucky, where he became the first player in EKU history to score at least 1,500 points and grab 900 total rebounds.
