= Otega Oweh =

American basketball player (born 2003)

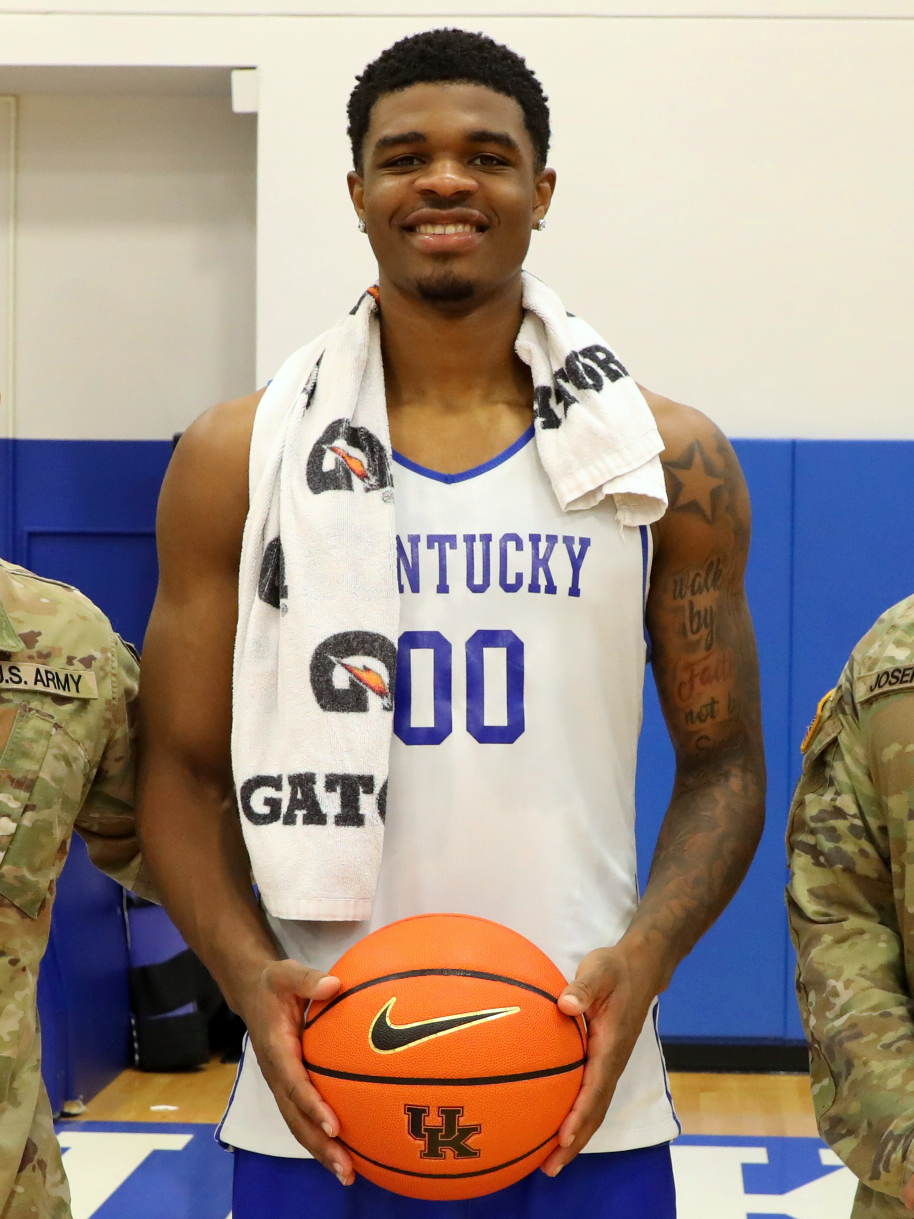
- Oweh with Kentucky in 2025

Free agent
- Position: Shooting guard

Personal information
- Born: June 21, 2003 (age 23) Union Township, New Jersey, U.S.
- Listed height: 6 ft 4 in (1.93 m)
- Listed weight: 215 lb (98 kg)

Career information
- High school: Blair Academy (Blairstown, New Jersey)
- College: Oklahoma (2022–2024); Kentucky (2024–2026)
- NBA draft: 2026: 2nd round, 41st overall pick
- Drafted by: Miami Heat
- Playing career: 2026–present

Career highlights
- 2× Second-team All-SEC (2025, 2026)
- Stats at NBA.com
- Stats at Basketball Reference

Otega Oweh (born June 21, 2003) is an American basketball player. He played college basketball for the Oklahoma Sooners and Kentucky Wildcats.

== High school career ==
Oweh attended Rutgers Preparatory School in Somerset, New Jersey where he played for esteemed head coach Matt Bloom. Rutgers Prep nurtured him defensively before transferring to Blair Academy in Blairstown, New Jersey. He helped lead Team Final to a 17U Peach Jam title, totaling 17 points and five rebounds in the championship game. A four-star recruit, Oweh committed to play college basketball at the University of Oklahoma.

== College career ==
=== Oklahoma (2022-2024) ===
After playing sparingly as a freshman, Oweh started 28 games as a sophomore, averaging 11.4 points and 3.8 rebounds per game. At the conclusion of his sophomore season, he entered the transfer portal.

=== Kentucky (2024-2026) ===
On April 27, 2024, Oweh announced his decision to transfer to the University of Kentucky to play for the Kentucky Wildcats. In his Kentucky debut against Wright State, he scored a team-high 21 points. In his first season with Kentucky, Oweh emerged as the team's leading scorer. Oweh began his junior season with 26 consecutive games scoring in double figures. On February 26, 2025, Oweh scored Kentucky’s final 18 points, set a new career-high with 28 points, and scored the game winner with six seconds remaining against his former team, the Oklahoma Sooners. Four games later in the second round of the 2025 SEC men's basketball tournament, Oweh scored 27 points and made another game winner with 0.5 seconds left against Oklahoma. Oweh was named Second Team All-SEC and averaged 16.2 points per game, 4.7 rebounds per game, 1.7 assists per game, and 1.6 steals per game.

Oweh initially declared for the 2025 NBA Draft while preserving his college eligibility. However, he removed his name from the draft pool and announced his return to Kentucky on May 28, 2025. On February 21, 2026, he had a regular-season career-high 29 points against the Auburn Tigers. On March 20, 2026, he had a career-high 35 points in an overtime win against the Santa Clara Broncos in the first round of the NCAA Tournament, including a buzzer-beater 3 to send the game to overtime, before the Wildcats lost to the Iowa State Cyclones in the second round. Oweh finished his career at Kentucky with 1,255 points, becoming the fastest player in the school’s history to reach 1,000 points as a Wildcat. Additionally, he scored 10 or more points in all but one game he played in, and was named Second Team All-SEC for the second consecutive year.

== Professional career ==
On June 24, 2026, Oweh was selected by the Miami Heat with the 41st overall pick in the 2026 NBA draft then immediately traded to the Oklahoma City Thunder with cash considerations for pick 37 (Ryan Conwell). On October 13th, 2026, Oweh sustained a torn achilles during a pre-season match against the Indiana Pacers. Upon his achilles injury, Oweh was waived by the Thunder on October 25, 2026 in favor of signing Micah Peavy.

== Career statistics ==
Legend
GP	Games played	GS	Games started	MPG	Minutes per game
FG%	Field goal percentage	3P%	3-point field goal percentage	FT%	Free throw percentage
RPG	Rebounds per game	APG	Assists per game	SPG	Steals per game
BPG	Blocks per game	PPG	Points per game	**Bold**	Career high

=== College ===
Year	Team	GP	GS	MPG	FG%	3P%	FT%	RPG	APG	SPG	BPG	PPG
2022–23	Oklahoma	28	9	13.2	.443	.250	.650	2.1	.2	1.2	.2	4.8
2023–24	Oklahoma	32	28	24.9	.493	.377	.643	3.8	1.0	1.5	.4	11.4
2024–25	Kentucky	36	36	28.3	.492	.355	.776	4.7	1.7	1.6	.5	16.2
2025–26	Kentucky	36	36	32.8	.465	.333	.731	4.8	2.7	1.8	.3	18.6

== Personal life ==
Oweh's brother, Odafe, is a linebacker for the Washington Commanders of the National Football League.
