= Dailyn Swain =

American basketball player (born 2005)

No. 5 – Chicago Bulls
- Position: Small forward
- League: NBA

Personal information
- Born: July 15, 2005 (age 21) Columbus, Ohio, U.S.
- Listed height: 6 ft 6 in (1.98 m)
- Listed weight: 220 lb (100 kg)

Career information
- High school: Columbus Africentric Early College (Columbus, Ohio)
- College: Xavier (2023–2025); Texas (2025–2026)
- NBA draft: 2026: 1st round, 15th overall pick
- Drafted by: Chicago Bulls
- Playing career: 2026–present

Career history
- 2026–present: Chicago Bulls
- 2026: →Windy City Bulls

Career highlights
- Second-team All-SEC (2026); SEC Newcomer of the Year (2026); Big East All-Freshman team (2024)
- Stats at NBA.com
- Stats at Basketball Reference

Dailyn Lamont Swain (born July 15, 2005) is an American basketball player for the Chicago Bulls of the National Basketball Association (NBA). He played college basketball for the Xavier Musketeers and Texas Longhorns.

== Early life and high school ==
Swain attended Columbus Africentric Early College in Columbus, Ohio. He started on the basketball team since his freshman season and finished as the team's all-time leading scorer with 1,509 points. Swain earned two consecutive Division III district Player of the Year honors and was named first-team all-state. He finished fourth in the voting for Ohio Mr. Basketball. Swain also played for the varsity tennis team for his final two seasons.

Swain played for All Ohio Red on the Nike Elite Youth Basketball League (EYBL) circuit, where he averaged 10.3 points, 4.2 rebounds, 3.5 assists and 2.1 steals per game.

== College career ==
=== Xavier ===
On September 2, 2022, Swain announced he was committing to Xavier University. He also had offers from Arizona State University, University of Arkansas, Clemson University and Ohio State University. Swain was one of three four-star recruits to sign a national letter of intent to Xavier as a member of the 2023 recruiting class.

On March 6, 2024, Swain was sidelined indefinitely after undergoing a successful appendectomy. On March 10, 2024, it was announced that Swain earned Big East Conference All-Freshman Team honors. He led all six Xavier freshmen in minutes at 18.9 per game before having his season shut down. Swain tied for third on the team in steals at 1.03 steals per game. He tied his career-high for rebounds with six in two of his last three games. On July 1, 2024, Swain was cleared for all basketball-related activities.

On March 24, 2025, Swain announced he would be entering the NCAA transfer portal.

=== Texas ===
On April 1, 2025, Swain announced that he would transfer to Texas. On May 1, 2025, Swain signed an Athletic Scholarship Agreement to play basketball at Texas. In the first game against Duke, Swain made his Texas debut, recording 16 points, six rebounds, one assist, and one block. On February 4, Swain was named to the Julius Erving Award Midseason Top 10. On April 7, 2026, Swain took to Instagram to announce that he will be entering the 2026 NBA Draft and forgoing his college eligibility.

== Professional career ==
On June 23, 2026, Swain was drafted with the 15th overall pick by the Chicago Bulls in the 2026 NBA draft. On October 26, Swain made his NBA debut against the Boston Celtics, playing 12 minutes and recording two points, two rebounds, two assists, and two steals.

== Career statistics ==
Legend
GP	Games played	GS	Games started	MPG	Minutes per game
FG%	Field goal percentage	3P%	3-point field goal percentage	FT%	Free throw percentage
RPG	Rebounds per game	APG	Assists per game	SPG	Steals per game
BPG	Blocks per game	PPG	Points per game	**Bold**	Career high

=== College ===
Year	Team	GP	GS	MPG	FG%	3P%	FT%	RPG	APG	SPG	BPG	PPG
2023–24	Xavier	29	3	19.0	.459	.154	.813	3.0	1.2	1.0	**0.7**	4.6
2024–25	Xavier	**34**	**33**	28.4	.532	.250	**.817**	5.5	2.6	1.6	0.6	11.0
2025–26	Texas	23	23	**31.1**	**.577**	**.317**	.793	**7.3**	**3.4**	**1.8**	0.3	**17.7**
Career		86	59	26.0	.537	.265	.806	5.1	2.4	1.5	0.6	10.6

== Personal life ==
Swain is the son of Constance Addrece and Dean Swain. He has three brothers: Dallas, Damarco, and Deno. He also has a sister named Daelah.
