= Somto Cyril =

Nigerian basketball player (born 2005)

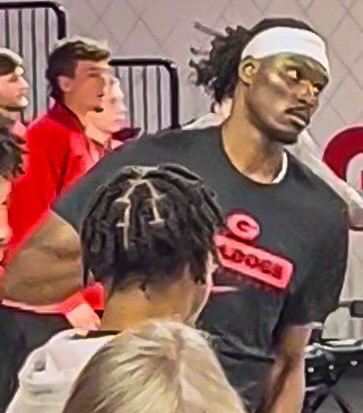
- Cyril in 2025

No. 2 – Miami Hurricanes
- Position: Center
- Conference: Atlantic Coast Conference

Personal information
- Born: May 20, 2005 (age 21)
- Listed height: 6 ft 11 in (2.11 m)
- Listed weight: 263 lb (119 kg)

Career information
- High school: Overtime Elite (Atlanta, Georgia)
- College: Georgia (2024–2026); Miami (Florida) (2026–present)

Career highlights
- SEC All-Defensive Team (2026)

Somtochukwu Cyril (born May 20, 2005) is a Nigerian college basketball player for the Miami Hurricanes of the Atlantic Coast Conference (ACC). He previously played for the Georgia Bulldogs.

== High school career ==
Cyril grew up in Enugu, Nigeria, and initially attended Hamilton Heights Christian Academy in Chattanooga, Tennessee. After his sophomore year, Cyril opted to leave Hamilton Heights to join the Overtime Elite league as a non-professional player in order to preserve his collegiate eligibility. In his first season with Overtime Elite, playing for the Cold Hearts team, he averaged 8.1 points 6.4 rebounds and 3.4 blocks, per game, while being named the OTE defensive player of the year. In his second year at Overtime Elite, he would decide to join the newly-formed RWE team instead.

Cyril was rated a four-star recruit and initially committed to play college basketball at Kentucky. However, after the departure of John Calipari from Kentucky, Cyril decommitted from Kentucky and reopened his recruitment process. Cyril later committed to play at Georgia over offers from Georgia Tech and Arkansas.

== College career ==
During his first year playing for Georgia, Cyril averaged 4.6 points, 3.8 rebounds, and 0.5 assists on an average of 14.6 minutes of playing time. With Georgia, Cyril scored a career high against the Jacksonville Dolphins scoring 13 points, where he shot a perfect six for six from the field goal. Additionally, in his game against the Buffalo Bulls, Cyril obtained his first-ever double double, scoring ten points and snagging 11 rebounds. He also obtained a season high in blocks, with him blocking five shots.

On April 12, 2026, Cyril announced his decision to transfer to the University of Miami to play for the Miami Hurricanes.

== Career statistics ==
Legend
GP	Games played	GS	Games started	MPG	Minutes per game
FG%	Field goal percentage	3P%	3-point field goal percentage	FT%	Free throw percentage
RPG	Rebounds per game	APG	Assists per game	SPG	Steals per game
BPG	Blocks per game	PPG	Points per game	**Bold**	Career high

=== College ===
Year	Team	GP	GS	MPG	FG%	3P%	FT%	RPG	APG	SPG	BPG	PPG
2024–25	Georgia	33	0	14.1	.626	.000	.488	3.8	.5	.2	1.5	4.6
2025–26	Georgia	33	32	21.2	.759	.000	.578	5.4	.6	.6	2.2	9.3
