= Labaron Philon Jr. =

American basketball player (born 2005)

- Labaron Philon Jr. with the 76ers in November 2026

No. 00 – Philadelphia 76ers
- Position: Point guard
- Conference: NBA

Personal information
- Born: November 24, 2005 (age 20) Mobile, Alabama, U.S.
- Listed height: 6 ft 4 in (1.93 m)
- Listed weight: 177 lb (80 kg)

Career information
- High school: Baker (Mobile, Alabama); Link Academy (Branson, Missouri)
- College: Alabama (2024–2026)
- NBA draft: 2026: 1st round, 22nd overall pick
- Drafted by: Philadelphia 76ers
- Playing career: 2026–present

Career history
- 2026–present: Philadelphia 76ers

Career highlights
- Third-team All-American – AP, NABC, USBWA, TSN (2026); First-team All-SEC (2026); SEC All-Freshman Team (2025); Jordan Brand Classic (2024); Alabama Mr. Basketball (2023)
- Stats at NBA.com
- Stats at Basketball Reference

Labaron Dewayne Philon Jr. (born November 24, 2005) is an American basketball player for the Philadelphia 76ers of the National Basketball Association (NBA). He played college basketball for the Alabama Crimson Tide.

== Early life and high school career ==
Philon was born on November 24, 2005 in Mobile, Alabama. He attended Baker High School in Mobile County where he played three seasons and scored a total of 2,334 points, being a two-time recipient of the Class 7A Player of the Year award. As a junior for Baker, he averaged 35 points, 6.2 rebounds and 3.9 assists per game, being named the Alabama Mr. Basketball. He transferred to Link Academy in Missouri for his senior season. He helped Link achieve a top-10 ranking nationally with an appearance in the national semifinals. Philon also played in the Nike Elite Youth Basketball League (EYBL), appearing in 12 games and averaging 11.7 points and 4.3 assists.

=== Recruiting ===
Philon was ranked the 32nd-best recruit nationally by ESPN and the fifth-best point guard recruit by On3. He initially committed to playing college basketball for Auburn, but later decommitted. He later signed a letter of intent to play for Kansas, but decided not to play with them either. He committed to Alabama on April 28, 2024.

College recruiting
Name	Hometown	School	Height	Weight	Commit date
Labaron Philon Jr. PG / SG	Mobile, AL	Link Academy (MO)	6 ft 3 in (1.91 m)	175 lb (79 kg)	Apr 28, 2024
Labaron Philon Jr. PG / SG	Recruit ratings: Rivals: 247Sports: On3: ESPN: (89)				
Overall recruit ranking: Rivals: 40 247Sports: 34 On3: 40 ESPN: 32
Note: In many cases, Scout, Rivals, 247Sports, On3, and ESPN may conflict in their listings of height and weight.; In these cases, the average was taken. ESPN grades are on a 100-point scale.; Sources: "Alabama 2024 Basketball Commitments". Rivals.; "2024 Alabama Crimson Tide Recruiting Class". ESPN.; "2024 Team Ranking". Rivals.

== College career ==
Philon impressed with Alabama as a freshman in the 2024–25 season, averaging 12.1 points on 51.4% shooting in his first 16 games. Following the season he declared for the 2025 NBA draft, but later withdrew. On April 7, 2026, Philon announced his declaration to the 2026 NBA draft.

== Professional career ==
On June 23, 2026, Philon was selected by the Philadelphia 76ers with the 22nd overall pick in the 2026 NBA draft.

== Career statistics ==
Legend
GP	Games played	GS	Games started	MPG	Minutes per game
FG%	Field goal percentage	3P%	3-point field goal percentage	FT%	Free throw percentage
RPG	Rebounds per game	APG	Assists per game	SPG	Steals per game
BPG	Blocks per game	PPG	Points per game	**Bold**	Career high

=== College ===
Year	Team	GP	GS	MPG	FG%	3P%	FT%	RPG	APG	SPG	BPG	PPG
2024–25	Alabama	37	29	24.7	.452	.315	.767	3.3	3.8	1.4	.3	10.6
2025–26	Alabama	33	32	30.9	.501	.399	.798	3.5	5.0	1.2	.2	22.0
