= Ja'Kobi Gillespie =

American basketball player (born 2004)

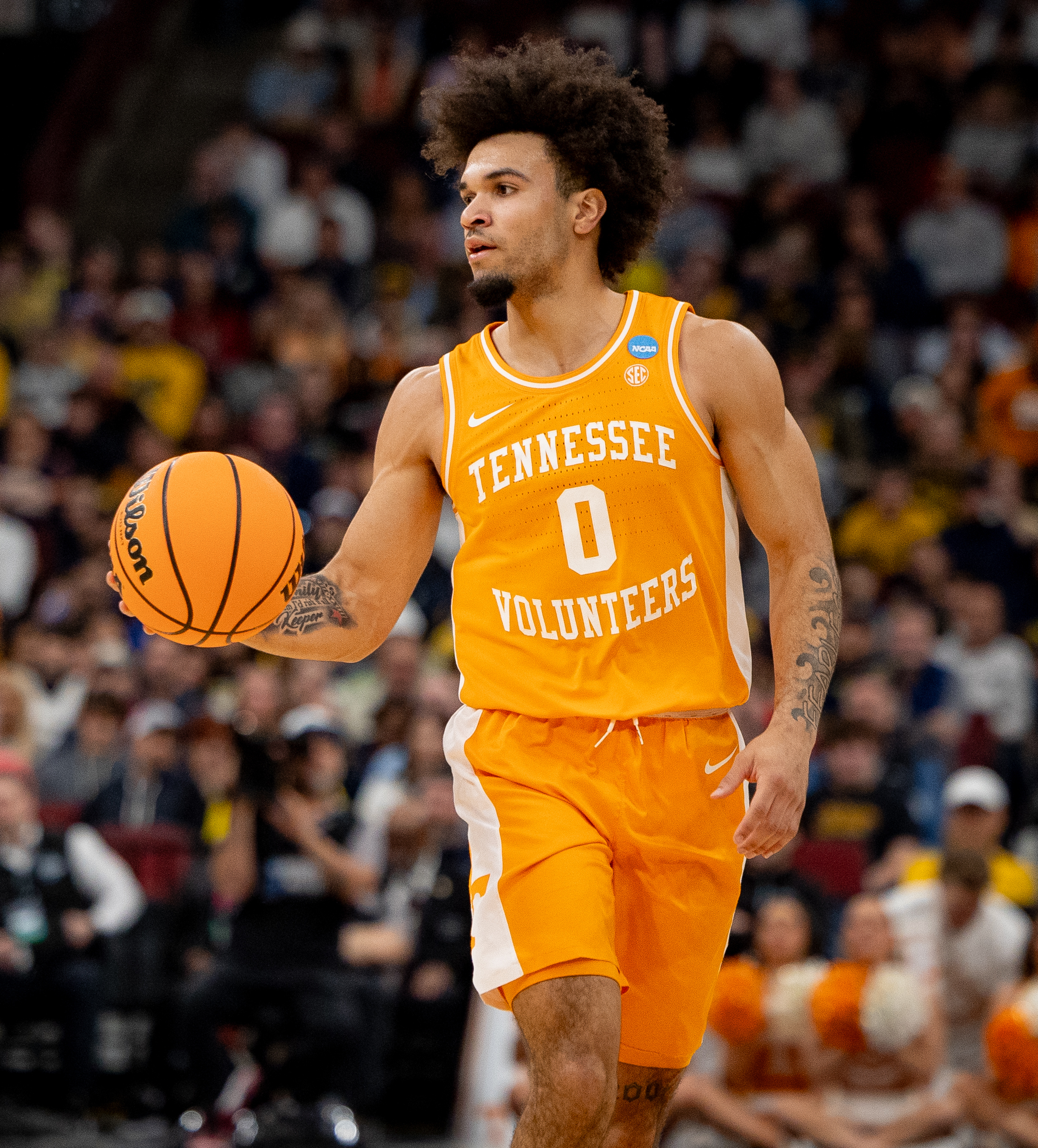

No. 17 – San Antonio Spurs
- Position: Point guard
- League: NBA

Personal information
- Born: March 10, 2004 (age 22) Greeneville, Tennessee, U.S.
- Listed height: 6 ft 0 in (1.83 m)
- Listed weight: 186 lb (84 kg)

Career information
- High school: Greeneville (Greeneville, Tennessee)
- College: Belmont (2022–2024); Maryland (2024–2025); Tennessee (2025–2026)
- NBA draft: 2026: 2nd round, 42nd overall pick
- Drafted by: San Antonio Spurs
- Playing career: 2026–present

Career history
- 2026–present: San Antonio Spurs
- 2026–present: →Austin Spurs

Career highlights
- First-team All-SEC (2026); Third-team All-Big Ten (2025); Second-team All-MVC (2024)
- Stats at NBA.com
- Stats at Basketball Reference

Ja'Kobi Broderick Gillespie (born March 10, 2004) is an American basketball player for the San Antonio Spurs of the National Basketball Association (NBA), on a two-way contract with the San Antonio Spurs of the NBA G League. He played college basketball for the Belmont Bruins, Maryland Terrapins and Tennessee Volunteers.

== Early life and high school ==
Gillespie attended Greeneville High School in Greeneville, Tennessee. He committed to play college basketball for the Belmont Bruins over from schools such as Vanderbilt, Virginia Tech and Eastern Kentucky.

== College career ==
=== Belmont ===
As a freshman in 2022-23, Gillespie averaged 9.6 points and 3.3 assists per game and was named to the Missouri Valley Conference (MVC) All-Freshman Team. In 2023-24, he averaged 17.2 points, 4.2 assists, 3.8 rebounds, and 2.2 steals per game and earned second-team all-MVC honors, MVC All-Defensive Team honors, while also being named to the MVC Most Improved Team. After the season, Gillespie entered his name into the NCAA transfer portal.

=== Maryland ===
Gillespie transferred to play for the Maryland Terrapins. On December 4, 2024, he recorded 23 points and four assists in victory over Ohio State. On December 21, Gillespie recorded 17 points, 11 assists and five rebounds in a victory against Syracuse. On January 10, 2025, he notched a career-high 27 points, four assists, and four steals in a win over UCLA. On January 19, Gillespie notched 1,000 career points after scoring 22 in victory over Nebraska. On January 26, he posted 18 points, nine assists, three rebounds, one steal, and one block versus Indiana. For his performance during the 2024-25 season, Gillespie was named third-team All-Big Ten Conference.

=== Tennessee ===
Gillespie transferred to play for the Tennessee Volunteers. He averaged 18.4 points, 5.4 assists and 2.8 rebounds per game in his only season for the team.

== Professional career ==
On June 24, 2026, the San Antonio Spurs selected Gillespie with the 42nd overall pick in the 2026 NBA draft. He signed a two-way contract with Spurs on 3 July, 2026.
