= Duke Miles =

American basketball player (born 2002)

No. 13 – Delaware Blue Coats
- Position: Shooting guard
- League: NBA G League

Personal information
- Born: February 3, 2002 (age 24) Montgomery, Alabama, U.S.
- Listed height: 6 ft 2 in (1.88 m)
- Listed weight: 188 lb (85 kg)

Career information
- High school: Robert E. Lee (Montgomery, Alabama)
- College: Troy (2020–2023); High Point (2023–2024); Oklahoma (2024–2025); Vanderbilt (2025–2026)
- NBA draft: 2026: undrafted
- Playing career: 2026–present

Career history
- 2026–present: Delaware Blue Coats

Career highlights
- Big South Newcomer of the Year (2024); First-team All-Big South (2024)
- Stats at NBA.com
- Stats at Basketball Reference

De'Marquiese "Duke" Miles (born February 3, 2002) is an American basketball player for the Delaware Blue Coats of the NBA G League. He played college basketball for the Troy Trojans, High Point Panthers, Oklahoma Sooners and for the Vanderbilt Commodores.

== Early life ==
Miles attended Dr. Percy L. Julian High School in Montgomery, Alabama. As a senior, he averaged 17.4 points, 4.8 assists, and 3.1 steals per game, helping his team to a 33-1 record. Miles committed to play college basketball for the Troy Trojans.

== College career ==
In three years at Troy from 2020 to 2023, Miles played in 49 games with 25 starts, averaging 9.2 points, 3.1 assists, 2.5 rebounds, and 1.8 steals per game. After the 2022-23 season, he entered the NCAA transfer portal. Miles transferred to play for the High Point Panthers, In 2023-24, he played 33 games with 27 starts, averaging 17.5 points, 3.6 assists, 2.3 rebounds, and 1.3 steals per game, after which he again entered the NCAA transfer portal.

Miles transferred to play for the Oklahoma Sooners. On December 22, 2024, he dropped 29 points, three rebounds, and three assists in a victory against Central Arkansas. That season, Miles started all 34 games, averaging 9.4 points, 2.5 rebounds, and 2.0 assists per game. After the season, he once again entered the NCAA transfer portal.

Miles transferred to play for the Vanderbilt Commodores. In the quarterfinals of the 2026 SEC men's basketball tournament, he notched a season-high 30 points, six rebounds, five assists, and three steals in a win over Tennessee. In the first round of the 2026 NCAA Division I men's basketball tournament, Miles scored 13 points in a victory versus McNeese. He averaged 16.1 points, 4.5 assists, 3.0 rebounds, and 2.6 steals per game on the season.
