= Alex Condon =

Australian basketball player (born 2004)

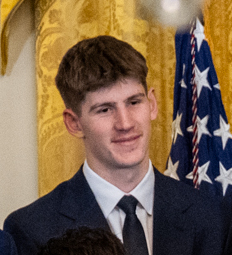
- Condon with Florida in 2025

No. 21 – Florida Gators
- Position: Power forward / center
- League: Southeastern Conference

Personal information
- Born: 25 July 2004 (age 22) Perth, Western Australia, Australia
- Listed height: 6 ft 11 in (2.11 m)
- Listed weight: 236 lb (107 kg)

Career information
- High school: Hale School (Perth, Western Australia)
- College: Florida (2023–present)
- Playing career: 2022–present

Career history
- 2022–2023: BA Centre of Excellence

Career highlights
- NCAA champion (2025); 2× Third-team All-SEC (2025, 2026); SEC All-Freshman Team (2024)

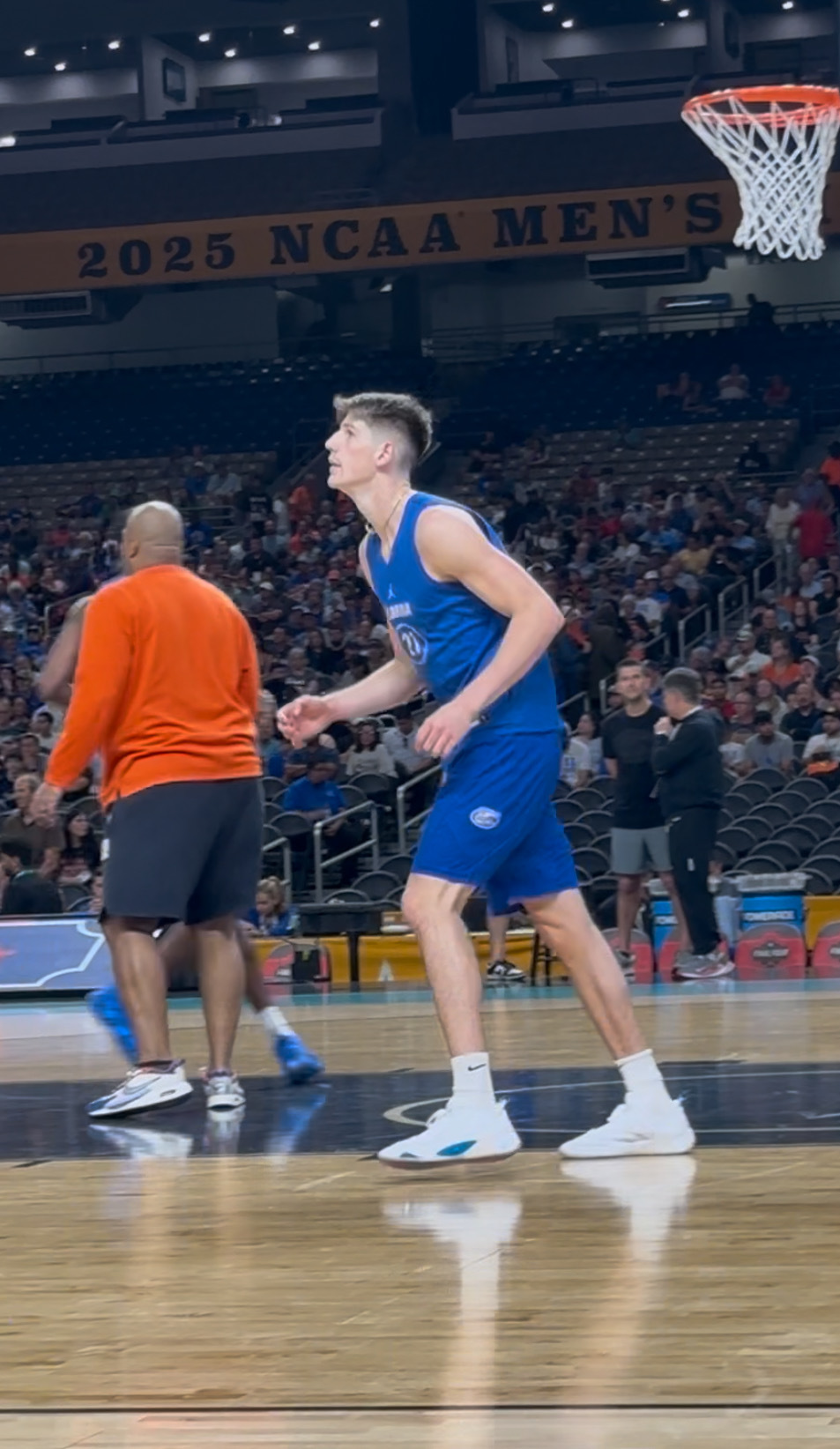
Alex Condon practicing ahead of the 2025 Final Four in San Antonio at the Alamodome

Alexander Condon (born 25 July 2004) is an Australian college basketball player for the Florida Gators of the Southeastern Conference (SEC).

== Early life and career ==
Condon was born and grew up in Perth, Western Australia. He initially attended Hale School. Condon also played Australian rules football and was considered a top prospect in the 2022 AFL draft.

Condon opted to focus solely on basketball and enrolled at the Basketball Australia Centre for Excellence (CoE) at the Australian Institute of Sport, which is partnered with the NBA Global Academy. He played two seasons for the BA Centre of Excellence men's team in the NBL1, averaging 6.9 points and 6.0 rebounds in 15 games during the 2022 season, and 11.4 points and 8.8 rebounds in eight games during the 2023 season.

== College career ==
Condon signed to play college basketball at Florida.<

Condon was named to the Southeastern Conference (SEC) All-Freshman team in the 2023–24 season with the Florida Gators after averaging 7.7 points, 6.4 rebounds, and 1.3 blocks per game.

Condon entered his sophomore season as a starter for the Gators. He helped the Gators finish the 2024–25 season with a 36–4 record while winning the NCAA championship. In the final of the NCAA tournament, Condon recorded 12 points, seven rebounds and four steals in a 65–63 win over Houston. In the dying seconds of the game, Condon dove on a loose ball to help the Gators secure the win. In 37 games, he averaged 10.6 points, 7.5 rebounds, 2.2 assists and 1.3 blocks per game. Throughout the year, Condon was recognised as the SEC Player of the Week three times. He was subsequently named third-team All-SEC.

== National team ==
In June 2026, Condon was named in the Australian Boomers squad for the next window of the FIBA Basketball World Cup 2027 Asian Qualifiers in Perth in July.

== Personal life ==
Condon's father, Damien, played Australian rules football for East Fremantle Football Club. His mother, Leah Broderick, is a former international swimmer and member of the Australian team.
