= Tyler Tanner (basketball) =

American basketball player (born 2006)

No. 3 – Vanderbilt Commodores
- Position: Point guard
- Conference: Southeastern Conference

Personal information
- Born: February 1, 2006 (age 20)
- Listed height: 6 ft 0 in (1.83 m)
- Listed weight: 167 lb (76 kg)

Career information
- High school: Brentwood Academy (Brentwood, Tennessee)
- College: Vanderbilt (2024–present)

Career highlights
- First-team All-SEC (2026); SEC All-Defensive Team (2026)

Tyler Tanner (born February 1, 2006) is an American college basketball player for the Vanderbilt Commodores of the Southeastern Conference (SEC).

== Early life ==
Tanner attended Brentwood Academy in Brentwood, Tennessee. As a senior, he averaged 26.2 points, 4.4 rebounds, 3.5 steals, and 3.3 assists per game, being named the Gatorade Tennessee Boys Basketball Player of the Year. Following his high school career, Tanner committed to play college basketball at Vanderbilt University.

== College career ==
As a true freshman, Tanner made an instant impact, becoming one of the Commodores' top defenders. He finished his first season averaging 5.7 points, 2.2 rebounds, and 1.7 steals per game in 33 contests. Tanner's production increased the following season, scoring a career-high 26 points in an 88–69 win over SMU. As a sophomore, Tanner averaged 19.5 points, 5.1 assists and 2.7 steals per game. He was named to the First Team All-SEC as well as the All-Defensive Team. Following the season, Tanner declared for the 2026 NBA draft. On May 27, 2026, Tanner withdrew from the NBA Draft and decided to return to Vanderbilt for his junior season.

== Career statistics ==
Legend
GP	Games played	GS	Games started	MPG	Minutes per game
FG%	Field goal percentage	3P%	3-point field goal percentage	FT%	Free throw percentage
RPG	Rebounds per game	APG	Assists per game	SPG	Steals per game
BPG	Blocks per game	PPG	Points per game	**Bold**	Career high

=== College ===
Year	Team	GP	GS	MPG	FG%	3P%	FT%	RPG	APG	SPG	BPG	PPG
2024–25	Vanderbilt	33	0	20.5	.465	.266	.750	2.2	1.9	1.7	.2	5.7
2025–26	Vanderbilt	**36**	**36**	**33.5**	**.485**	**.368**	**.853**	**3.6**	**5.1**	**2.4**	**.3**	**19.5**
Career		69	36	27.2	.480	.339	.840	3.0	3.6	2.0	.2	12.9

== Personal life ==
Tanner is the son of D’Wayne and Jenifer Tanner, who both played basketball at Rice University. D'Wayne owns the Southwest Conference record with 291 career steals and is Rice’s career and single-season (95) steals record holder.
