= 2025–26 Florida Gators men's basketball team =

American college basketball season

2025–26 Florida Gators men's basketball

SEC regular season champions

NCAA tournament, Second round
- Conference: Southeastern Conference

Ranking
- Coaches: No. 9
- AP: No. 9
- Record: 27–8 (16–2 SEC)
- Head coach: Todd Golden (4th season)
- Assistant coaches: Carlin Hartman (4th season); Korey McCray (4th season); Taurean Green (3rd season); Jonathan Safir (1st season); David Klatsky (1st season)
- Home arena: O'Connell Center

2025–26 Southeastern Conference men's basketball standings
	Conf.				Overall
Team	W		L	PCT	W		L	PCT
No. 9 Florida	16	–	2	.889	27	–	8	.771
No. 16 Alabama	13	–	5	.722	25	–	10	.714
No. 13 Arkansas †	13	–	5	.722	28	–	9	.757
No. 19 Vanderbilt	11	–	7	.611	27	–	9	.750
No. 12 Tennessee	11	–	7	.611	25	–	12	.676
Texas A&M	11	–	7	.611	22	–	12	.647
Georgia	10	–	8	.556	22	–	11	.667
Missouri	10	–	8	.556	20	–	13	.606
Kentucky	10	–	8	.556	22	–	14	.611
No. 22 Texas	9	–	9	.500	21	–	15	.583
Oklahoma	7	–	11	.389	21	–	16	.568
Auburn	7	–	11	.389	22	–	16	.579
Mississippi State	5	–	13	.278	13	–	19	.406
South Carolina	4	–	14	.222	13	–	19	.406
Ole Miss	4	–	14	.222	15	–	20	.429
LSU	3	–	15	.167	15	–	17	.469
† 2026 SEC tournament winner Rankings from AP poll

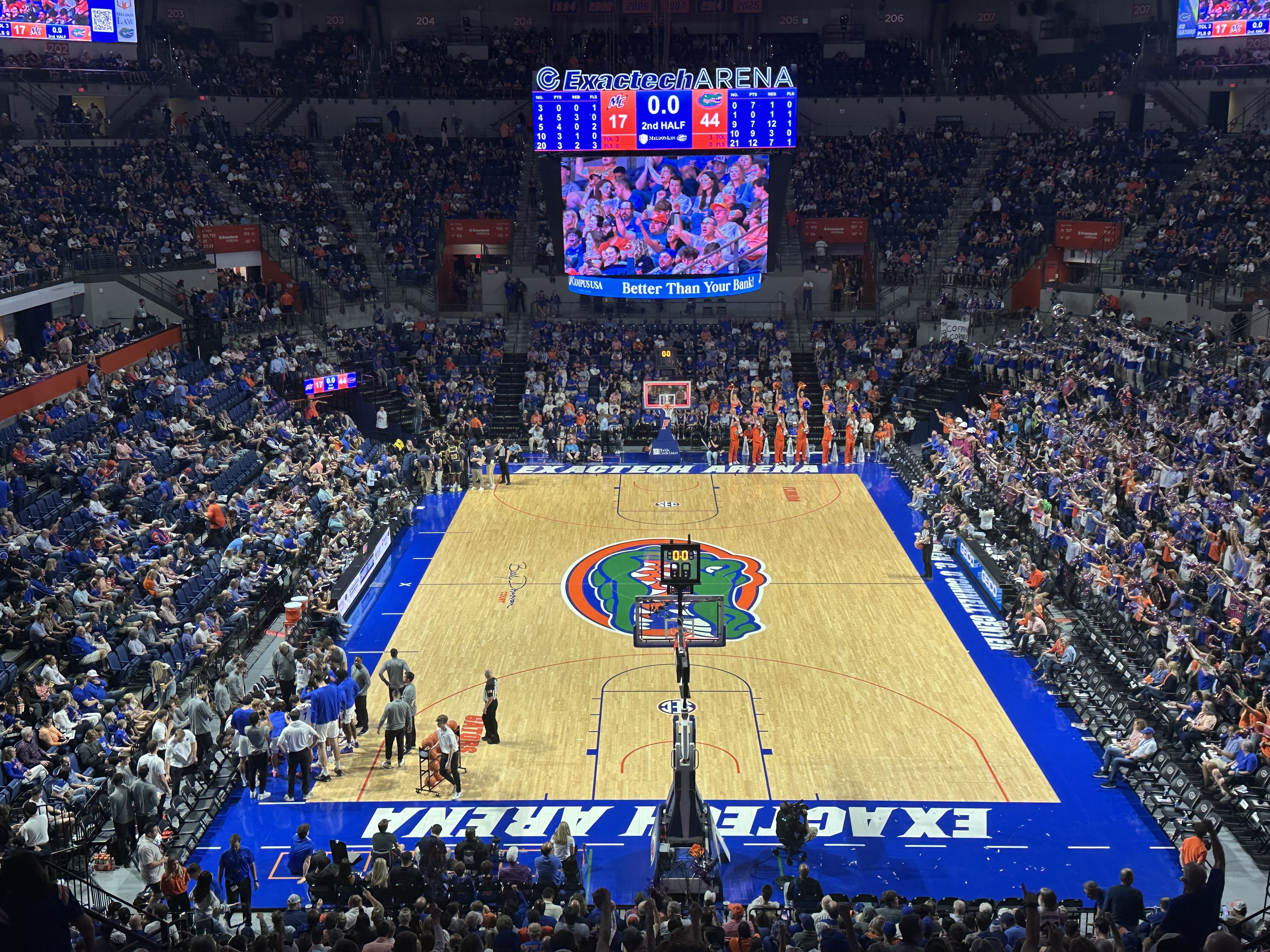
The O'Connell Center prior to a Florida Gators basketball game against Merrimack in November 2025

The 2025–26 Florida Gators men's basketball team represented the University of Florida during the 2025–26 NCAA Division I men's basketball season. The Gators, led by fourth-year head coach Todd Golden, played their home games at the O'Connell Center in Gainesville, Florida as members of the Southeastern Conference (SEC). They entered the season as the defending National Champions.

== Previous season ==
The Gators finished the 2024–25 season with a 27–4 regular season record, finishing second in the most difficult SEC season in conference history. The Gators got off to a hot start when they finished non-conference play with a 13–0 record and No. 6 ranking in the AP Poll, which was their highest ranking in 7 years. Despite early losses to Kentucky and Missouri, Florida got hot and finished the regular season winning 9 of their last 10 games. During this stretch, they pulled off massive wins on the road against No. 1 Auburn and No. 7 Alabama. Led by Clayton Jr. and Alex Condon, Florida was able to beat a No. 1 team on the road for the first time in program history.

As the No. 2 seed in the SEC tournament at Bridgestone Arena in Nashville, Tennessee, they defeated Missouri, 95–81, in the quarterfinals and Alabama, 104–82, in the semifinals to advance to the SEC Championship, where they defeated Tennessee, 86–77, to clinch their first SEC championship since 2014. They received an automatic bid to the 2025 NCAA Division I men's basketball tournament as the No. 1 seed in the West region. They defeated Norfolk State, 95–69, in the first round, two-time defending national champions UConn, 77–75, in the second round, and Maryland, 87–71, in the Sweet Sixteen to advance to the Elite Eight. There, they defeated Texas Tech, 84–79, to advance to their first Final Four since 2014. They would then defeat SEC rival Auburn, 79–73, to advance to their first championship since 2007. In the championship game, they overcame a 12-point deficit late in the second half to beat Houston, 65–63, to clinch their third national title overall and their first since 2007.

== Offseason ==
=== Departures ===
Florida departures
Name	Number	Pos.	Height	Weight	Year	Hometown	Reason for Departure
Walter Clayton Jr.	1	G	6'3"	195	Graduate Student	Lake Wales, FL	Graduated/2025 NBA draft; selected 18th overall by Washington Wizards, but ultimately got traded to the Utah Jazz
Kevin Pazmino	2	G	6'4"	195	Sophomore	Weston, FL	Walk-on; TBD
Sam Alexis	4	F	6'8"	240	Junior	Apopka, FL	Transferred to Indiana
Will Richard	5	G	6'4"	206	Senior	Fairburn, GA	Graduated/2025 NBA draft; selected 56th overall by Memphis Grizzlies, but ultimately got traded to the Golden State Warriors
Denzel Aberdeen	11	G	6'5"	190	Junior	Orlando, FL	Transferred to Kentucky
Alijah Martin	15	G	6'2"	210	Graduate Student	Summit, MS	Graduated/2025 NBA draft; selected 39th overall by Toronto Raptors
Bennett Andersen	22	G	6'2"	190	Graduate Student	Tampa, FL	Walk-on; graduated
Kajus Kublickas	30	G	6'2"	180	Sophomore	Kaunas, Lithuania	Transferred to Pacific

=== Incoming transfers ===
Florida incoming transfers
Name	Number	Pos.	Height	Weight	Year	Hometown	Previous School
Boogie Fland	0	G	6'2"	175	Sophomore	Bronx, NY	Arkansas
Xaivian Lee	1	G	6'4"	180	Senior	Toronto, ON	Princeton
AJ Brown	23	G	6'4"	210	(redshirt) Junior	Orlando, FL	Ohio
Alex Kovatchev	8	G	6'5"	195	(redshirt) Sophomore	Perth, Australia	Sacramento State

=== 2025 recruiting class ===
College recruiting information
Name	Hometown	School	Height	Weight	Commit date
Cornelius Ingram Jr. #7 SF	Hawthorne, FL	Montverde Academy	6 ft 6 in (1.98 m)	200 lb (91 kg)	Aug 12, 2024
Cornelius Ingram Jr. #7 SF	Recruit ratings: Rivals: 247Sports: ESPN: (89)				
Alexander Lloyd #12 SG	Fort Lauderdale, FL	Westminster Academy	6 ft 3 in (1.91 m)	165 lb (75 kg)	Apr 17, 2024
Alexander Lloyd #12 SG	Recruit ratings: Rivals: 247Sports: ESPN: (87)				
Overall recruit ranking:
Note: In many cases, Scout, Rivals, 247Sports, On3, and ESPN may conflict in their listings of height and weight.; In these cases, the average was taken. ESPN grades are on a 100-point scale.; Sources: "Florida 2023 Basketball Commitments". Rivals.; "2023 Team Ranking". Rivals.

== Roster ==
2025–26 Florida Gators men's basketball team
Players
Coaches

Pos.	#	Name	Height	Weight	Year	Previous school	Hometown
G	0	Boogie Fland	6 ft 3 in (1.91 m)	180 lb (82 kg)	So	Archbishop Stepinac HS; Arkansas	Bronx, NY
G	1	Xaivian Lee	6 ft 4 in (1.93 m)	180 lb (82 kg)	Sr	Perkiomen School; Princeton	Toronto, ON
C	3	Micah Handlogten	7 ft 1 in (2.16 m)	265 lb (120 kg)	Sr	SouthLake Christian Academy; Marshall	Lake Norman, NC
G	4	Alex Lloyd	6 ft 3 in (1.91 m)	178 lb (81 kg)	Fr	Westminster Academy	Fort Lauderdale, FL
G	7	Urban Klavžar	6 ft 1 in (1.85 m)	195 lb (88 kg)	Jr	Real Madrid	Domžale, Slovenia
G	8	Alex Kovatchev	6 ft 5 in (1.96 m)	195 lb (88 kg)	RS So	Woodvale Secondary; Sacramento State	Perth, Australia
C	9	Rueben Chinyelu	6 ft 10 in (2.08 m)	265 lb (120 kg)	Jr	Stade Malien; Washington State	Enugwu-Agidi, Nigeria
F	10	Thomas Haugh	6 ft 9 in (2.06 m)	215 lb (98 kg)	Jr	Perkiomen School	New Oxford, PA
G	11	CJ Ingram	6 ft 6 in (1.98 m)	202 lb (92 kg)	Fr	Montverde Academy	Hawthorne, FL
C	12	Viktor Mikić	6 ft 11 in (2.11 m)	250 lb (113 kg)	So	Hamilton Heights (TN)	Belgrade, Serbia
G	20	Isaiah Brown	6 ft 4 in (1.93 m)	210 lb (95 kg)	So	Orlando Christian Prep	Orlando, FL
F/C	21	Alex Condon	6 ft 11 in (2.11 m)	230 lb (104 kg)	Jr	NBA Global Academy	Perth, Australia
G	23	AJ Brown	6 ft 4 in (1.93 m)	210 lb (95 kg)	RS Jr	Orlando Christian Prep; Ohio	Orlando, FL
C	32	Olivier Rioux	7 ft 9 in (2.36 m)	305 lb (138 kg)	RS Fr	IMG Academy	Terrebonne, QC
G	33	Cooper Josefsberg (W)	6 ft 4 in (1.93 m)	195 lb (88 kg)	Jr	Riviera Prep	Miami, FL

Head coach

- Todd Golden (Saint Mary's)

Assistant coach(es)

- Carlin Hartman (Tulane)
- Korey McCray (Mercer)
- Taurean Green (Florida)
- Jonathan Safir (Columbia)
- David Klatsky (Penn)

Legend

- (C) Team captain
- (S) Suspended
- (I) Ineligible
- (W) Walk-on
- Injured
- Current redshirt

Roster

== Schedule and results ==
Date time, TV	Rank^{#}	Opponent^{#}	Result	Record	High points	High rebounds	High assists	Site (attendance) city, state
Non-conference regular season
November 3, 2025*; 7:00 p.m., TNT/TruTV	No. 3	vs. No. 13 Arizona; Hall of Fame Series – Las Vegas	L 87–93	0–1	27 – Haugh	12 – Handlogten	5 – Lee	T-Mobile Arena (16,704); Paradise, NV
November 6, 2025*; 8:00 p.m., SECN+/ESPN+	No. 3	North Florida	W 104–64	1–1	25 – Condon	13 – Handlogten	4 – Tied	O'Connell Center (10,065); Gainesville, FL
November 11, 2025*; 7:00 p.m., SECN	No. 10	Florida State; Rivalry	W 78–76	2–1	20 – Haugh	16 – Chinyelu	6 – Lee	O'Connell Center (10,785); Gainesville, FL
November 16, 2025*; 8:00 p.m., ESPN	No. 10	vs. Miami (FL); Jacksonville Hoops Showdown	W 82–68	3–1	19 – Condon	10 – Tied	5 – Lee	VyStar Veterans Memorial Arena (8,321); Jacksonville, FL
November 21, 2025*; 7:00 p.m., SECN+/ESPN+	No. 10	Merrimack	W 80–45	4–1	20 – Condon	21 – Chinyelu	3 – Tied	O'Connell Center (10,935); Gainesville, FL
November 27, 2025*; 3:00 p.m., FS1	No. 10	vs. TCU; Rady Children's Invitational Semifinal	L 80–84	4–2	20 – Tied	9 – Chinyelu	8 – Condon	Jenny Craig Pavilion (4,955); San Diego, CA
November 28, 2025*; 3:00 p.m., FOX	No. 10	vs. Providence; Rady Children's Invitational 3rd place Game	W 90–78	5–2	20 – Lee	12 – Haugh	5 – Haugh	Jenny Craig Pavilion (5,008); San Diego, CA
December 2, 2025*; 7:30 p.m., ESPN	No. 15	at No. 4 Duke; ACC–SEC Challenge	L 66–67	5–3	24 – Haugh	14 – Chinyelu	2 – Klavzar	Cameron Indoor Stadium (9,314); Durham, NC
December 9, 2025*; 9:00 p.m., ESPN	No. 18	vs. No. 5 UConn; Jimmy V Classic	L 73–77	5–4	19 – Lee	11 – Chinyelu	5 – Lee	Madison Square Garden (19,694); New York, NY
December 13, 2025*; 2:30 p.m., ESPN2	No. 18	vs. George Washington; Orange Bowl Basketball Classic	W 80–70	6–4	24 – Lee	9 – Condon	7 – Condon	Amerant Bank Arena (11,767); Sunrise, FL
December 17, 2025*; 6:30 p.m., SECN	No. 23т	Saint Francis	W 102–61	7–4	18 – Lee	11 – Chinyelu	5 – Condon	O'Connell Center (9,023); Gainesville, FL
December 21, 2025*; 12:00 p.m., SECN+/ESPN+	No. 23т	Colgate	W 90–60	8–4	19 – Lee	12 – Chinyelu	5 – Condon	O'Connell Center (10,189); Gainesville, FL
December 29, 2025*; 6:00 p.m., SECN	No. 22	Dartmouth	W 94–72	9–4	17 – Condon	12 – Tied	4 – Condon	O'Connell Center (10,917); Gainesville, FL
SEC regular season
January 3, 2026; 8:30 p.m., SECN	No. 22	at Missouri	L 74–76	9–5 (0–1)	24 – Haugh	8 – Chinyelu	7 – Fland	Mizzou Arena (12,746); Columbia, MO
January 6, 2026; 7:00 p.m., SECN		No. 18 Georgia	W 92–77	10–5 (1–1)	21 – Tied	12 – Haugh	6 – Fland	O'Connell Center (9,563); Gainesville, FL
January 10, 2026; 12:00 p.m., ESPN		No. 21 Tennessee	W 91–67	11–5 (2–1)	23 – Fland	16 – Chinyelu	5 – Fland	O'Connell Center (10,182); Gainesville, FL
January 13, 2026; 9:00 p.m., ESPN2	No. 19	at Oklahoma	W 96–79	12–5 (3–1)	21 – Haugh	12 – Chinyelu	7 – Fland	Lloyd Noble Center (5,866); Norman, OK
January 17, 2026; 2:00 p.m., ESPN	No. 19	at No. 10 Vanderbilt	W 98–94	13–5 (4–1)	20 – Tied	10 – Chinyelu	3 – Tied	Memorial Gymnasium (14,316); Nashville, TN
January 20, 2026; 7:00 p.m., ESPN2	No. 16	LSU	W 79–61	14–5 (5–1)	18 – Klavzar	21 – Chinyelu	4 – Fland	O'Connell Center (10,593); Gainesville, FL
January 24, 2026; 4:00 p.m., ESPN	No. 16	Auburn	L 67–76	14–6 (5–2)	27 – Haugh	10 – Haugh	5 – Fland	O'Connell Center (11,104); Gainesville, FL
January 28, 2026; 9:00 p.m., SECN	No. 19	at South Carolina	W 95–48	15–6 (6–2)	18 – Haugh	11 – Chinyelu	9 – Lee	Colonial Life Arena (12,686); Columbia, SC
February 1, 2026; 1:00 p.m., ABC	No. 19	No. 23 Alabama	W 100–77	16–6 (7–2)	25 – Condon	17 – Chinyelu	8 – Fland	O'Connell Center (10,627); Gainesville, FL
February 7, 2026; 8:30 p.m., SECN	No. 17	at Texas A&M	W 86–67	17–6 (8–2)	20 – Haugh	15 – Chinyelu	4 – Fland	Reed Arena (12,831); College Station, TX
February 11, 2026; 7:00 p.m., ESPN2	No. 14	at Georgia	W 86–66	18–6 (9–2)	18 – Lee	20 – Chinyelu	7 – Lee	Stegeman Coliseum (10,034); Athens, GA
February 14, 2026; 3:00 p.m., ABC	No. 14	No. 25 Kentucky; Rivalry	W 92–83	19–6 (10–2)	22 – Lee	11 – Tied	3 – Lee	O'Connell Center (11,230); Gainesville, FL
February 17, 2026; 7:00 p.m., SECN	No. 12	South Carolina	W 76–62	20–6 (11–2)	20 – Condon	17 – Chinyelu	5 – Lee	O'Connell Center (10,622); Gainesville, FL
February 21, 2026; 12:00 p.m., ESPN	No. 12	at Ole Miss	W 94–75	21–6 (12–2)	24 – Condon	9 – Haugh	10 – Lee	SJB Pavilion (8,051); Oxford, MS
February 25, 2026; 7:00 p.m., ESPN2	No. 7	at Texas	W 84–71	22–6 (13–2)	23 – Condon	8 – Brown	6 – Lee	Moody Center (11,313); Austin, TX
February 28, 2026; 8:30 p.m., ESPN	No. 7	No. 20 Arkansas; College GameDay	W 111–77	23–6 (14–2)	22 – Haugh	16 – Chinyelu	5 – Lee	O'Connell Center (11,076); Gainesville, FL
March 3, 2026; 8:00 p.m., SECN	No. 5	Mississippi State	W 108–74	24–6 (15–2)	26 – Condon	16 – Chinyelu	6 – Lee	O'Connell Center (10,967); Gainesville, FL
March 7, 2026; 4:00 p.m., ESPN	No. 5	at Kentucky; Rivalry	W 84–77	25–6 (16–2)	20 – Haugh	9 – Haugh	6 – Fland	Rupp Arena (20,140); Lexington, KY
SEC tournament
March 13, 2026; 1:00 p.m., ESPN	(1) No. 4	vs. (9) Kentucky; Quarterfinal/Rivalry	W 71–63	26–6	22 – Condon	10 – Tied	6 – Lee	Bridgestone Arena (17,864); Nashville, TN
March 14, 2026; 1:00 p.m., ESPN	(1) No. 4	vs. (4) No. 22 Vanderbilt; Semifinal	L 74–91	26–7	19 – Haugh	9 – Haugh	4 – Tied	Bridgestone Arena (16,612); Nashville, TN
NCAA tournament
March 20, 2026; 9:25 p.m., TNT	(1 S) No. 4	vs. (16 S) Prairie View A&M; First round	W 114–55	27–7	16 – Fland	13 – Chinyelu	7 – Haugh	Benchmark International Arena (20,112); Tampa, FL
March 22, 2026; 7:10 p.m., TBS	(1 S) No. 4	vs. (9 S) Iowa; Second round	L 72–73	27–8	21 – Condon	6 – Haugh	7 – Condon	Benchmark International Arena (17,996); Tampa, FL
*Non-conference game. ^{#}Rankings from AP poll. (#) Tournament seedings in parentheses. S=South. All times are in Eastern Time.

== Game summaries ==
This section will be filled in as the season progresses.

=== No. 13 Arizona (Hall of Fame Series - Las Vegas) ===
TNT/TruTV

November 3, 2025
7:00 p.m. EST

Recap

No. 13 Arizona Wildcats 93, No. 3 Florida Gators 87
Scoring by half: 50-46, 43-41
Pts: Koa Peat - 30; Rebs: Ivan Kharchenkov - 10; Asts: Tied - 5	Pts: Thomas Haugh - 27; Rebs: Micah Handlogten - 12; Asts: Xaivian Lee - 5

T-Mobile Arena • Las Vegas, Nevada
Attendance: 16,704
Referees: Bart Lenox, Kipp Kissinger, Keith Kimble

=== vs North Florida ===
SECN+/ESPN+

November 6, 2025
8:00 p.m. EST

Recap

North Florida Ospreys 64, No. 3 Florida Gators 104
Scoring by half: 28-52, 36-52
Pts: Kamrin Oriol - 19; Rebs: Tied - 5 Asts: Devin Hines - 2	Pts: Alex Condon - 25; Rebs: Micah Handlogten - 13; Asts: Tied - 4

O'Connell Center • Gainesville, Florida
Attendance: 10,065
Referees: Doug Shows, James Breeding, Erroll Lewis

=== vs Florida State (Rivalry) ===
SECN

November 11, 2025
7:00 p.m. EST

Recap

Florida State Seminoles 76, No. 10 Florida Gators 78
Scoring by half: 40-37, 36-41
Pts: Robert McCray V - 29; Rebs: Kobe MaGee - 9 Asts: Robert McCray V - 4	Pts: Thomas Haugh - 20; Rebs: Rueben Chinyelu - 16; Asts: Xaivian Lee - 6

O'Connell Center • Gainesville, Florida
Attendance: 10,785
Referees: Lee Cassell, Joe Lindsay, Pat Adams

=== Miami (FL) (Jacksonville Hoops Showdown) ===
ESPN

November 16, 2025
8:00 p.m. EST

Recap

No. 10 Florida Gators 82, Miami (FL) Hurricanes 68
Scoring by half: 29-39, 39-43
Pts: Malik Reneau - 22; Rebs: Malik Reneau - 11; Asts: Tre Donaldson - 6	Pts: Alex Condon - 19; Rebs: Tied - 10; Asts: Xaivian Lee - 5

VyStar Veterans Memorial Arena • Jacksonville, Florida
Referees: James Breeding, Byron Jannett, A.J. Desai

=== vs Merrimack ===
SECN+/ESPN+

November 21, 2025
7:00 p.m. EST

Recap

Merrimack Warriors 45, No. 10 Florida Gators 80
Scoring by half: 17-44, 28-36
Pts: Kevair Kennedy - 14; Rebs: Todd Brogna - 6 Asts: Tied - 2	Pts: Alex Condon - 20; Rebs: Rueben Chinyelu - 21; Asts: Tied - 3

O'Connell Center • Gainesville, Florida
Referees: Brian Dorsey, Rob Rorke, Chuck McCoy

=== TCU (Rady Children's Invitational semifinals) ===
FS1

November 27, 2025
3:00 p.m. EST

Recap

TCU Horned Frogs 84, No. 10 Florida Gators 80
Scoring by half: 39-44, 45-36
Pts: Jace Posey - 21; Rebs: David Punch - 9 Asts: Brock Harding - 12	Pts: Tied - 20; Rebs: Rueben Chinyelu - 9 Asts: Alex Condon - 8

Jenny Craig Pavilion • San Diego, California
Attendance: 4,955
Referees: Kipp Kissinger, Brooks Wells, Chris Pacsi

=== Providence (Rady Children's Inviational 3rd Place Game) ===
FOX

November 28, 2025
3:00 or 5:30 p.m. EST

Recap

Providence Friers 78, No. 10 Florida Gators 90
Scoring by half: 39-45, 39-45
Pts: Ryan Mela - 17; Rebs: Ryan Mela - 8 Asts: Ryan Mela - 3	Pts: Xaivian Lee - 20; Rebs: Thomas Haugh - 12; Asts: Thomas Haugh - 5

Jenny Craig Pavilion • San Diego, California
Referees: Michael Greenstein, Brooks Wells, Chris Pacsi

=== at Duke (ACC–SEC Challenge) ===
ESPN

December 2, 2025
7:30 p.m. EST

Recap

No. 15 Florida Gators 66, No. 4 Duke Blue Devils 67
Scoring by half: 24-36, 42-31
Pts: Thomas Haugh - 24; Rebs: Rueben Chinyelu - 14; Asts: Urban Klavžar - 2	Pts: Cameron Boozer - 29; Rebs: Cameron Boozer - 6 Asts: Patrick Ngongba II - 5

Cameron Indoor Stadium • Durham, North Carolina
Attendance: 9,314
Referees: Brian O'Connell, Tony Chiazza, Roger Ayers

=== UConn (Jimmy V Classic) ===
ESPN

December 9, 2025
9:00 p.m. EST

Recap

No. 5 UConn Huskies 77, No. 18 Florida Gators 73
Scoring by half: 39-32, 38-41
Pts: Solo Ball - 19; Rebs: Tarris Reed - 5 Asts: Malachi Smith - 9	Pts: Xaivian Lee - 19; Rebs: Rueben Chinyelu - 11; Asts: Xaivian Lee - 5

Madison Square Garden • New York, New York
Attendance: 19,694
Referees: Doug Shows, James Breeding, Marques Pettigrew

=== George Washington (Orange Bowl Classic) ===
ESPN2

December 13, 2025
2:30 p.m. EST

Recap

George Washington Revolutionaries 70, No. 18 Florida Gators 80
Scoring by half: 27-30, 43-50
Pts: Trey Autry - 15; Rebs: Tyrone Marshall Jr - 7 Asts: Rafael Castro - 3	Pts: Xaivian Lee - 24; Rebs: Alex Condon - 9 Asts: Alex Condon - 7

Amerant Bank Arena • Sunrise, Florida
Attendance: 11,767
Referees: Byron Jarrett, Bharat Ramnanan, Chase Shaw

=== vs Saint Francis ===
SECN

December 17, 2025
6:30 p.m. EST

Recap

Saint Francis Red Flash 61, No. 23 Florida Gators 102
Scoring by half: 23-47, 38-55
Pts: Skylar Wicks - 22; Rebs: Zion Russell - 5 Asts: Zion Russell - 3	Pts: Xaivian Lee - 18; Rebs: Rueben Chinyelu - 11; Asts: Alex Condon - 4

O'Connell Center • Gainesville, Florida
Attendance: 9,023
Referees: Patrick Evans, Bart Lenox, Shaun Seales

=== vs Colgate ===
SECN+/ESPN+

December 21, 2025
12:00 p.m. EST

Recap

Colgate Raiders 60, No. 23 Florida Gators 90
Scoring by half: 31-43, 29-47
Pts: Kyle Carlesimo - 14; Rebs: Ben Tweedy - 5 Asts: Sam Wright - 4	Pts: Xaivian Lee - 19; Rebs: Rueben Chinyelu - 12; Asts: Alex Condon - 5

O'Connell Center • Gainesville, Florida
Attendance: 10,189
Referees: Rob Rorke, Landon Brandes, Devyn Page

=== vs Dartmouth ===
SECN

December 29, 2025
6:00 p.m. EST

Recap

Dartmouth Big Green 72, No. 22 Florida Gators 94
Scoring by half: 27-53, 45-41
Pts: Cameron McNamee - 16; Rebs: Brandon Mitchell-Day - 9 Asts: Connor Amundsen - 7	Pts: Alex Condon - 17; Rebs: Tied - 12; Asts: Boogie Fland - 5

O'Connell Center • Gainesville, Florida
Attendance: 10,917
Referees: Ron Groover, Anthony Eades, K.B. Burdett Jr.

=== at Missouri ===
SECN

January 3, 2026
8:30 p.m. EST

Recap

No. 22 Florida Gators 74, Missouri Tigers 76
Scoring by half: 39-39, 35-37
Pts: Thomas Haugh - 24; Rebs: Rueben Chinyelu - 8 Asts: Boogie Fland - 7	Pts: Anthony Robinson II - 19; Rebs: Anthony Robinson II - 8 Asts: Anthony Robinson II - 5

Mizzou Arena • Columbia, Missouri
Attendance: 12,746
Referees: Anthony Jordan, Owen Shortt, Don Daily

=== vs Georgia ===
SECN

January 6, 2026
7:00 p.m. EST

Recap

No. 18 Georgia Bulldogs 77, Florida Gators 92
Scoring by half: 40-41, 37-51
Pts: Marcus Millender - 18; Rebs: Tied - 6 Asts: Blue Cain - 2	Pts: Tied - 21; Rebs: Thomas Haugh - 12; Asts: Boogie Fland - 6

O'Connell Center • Gainesville, Florida
Attendance: 12,746
Referees: Anthony Jordan, Owen Shortt, Don Daily

=== vs Tennessee ===
ESPN

January 10, 2026
12:00 p.m. EST

Recap

No. 21 Tennessee Volunteers 67, Florida Gators 91
Scoring by half: 28-41, 39-50
Pts: Nate Ament - 17; Rebs: Tied - 5 Asts: Ja'Kobi Gillespie - 3	Pts: Boogie Fland - 23; Rebs: Rueben Chinyelu - 16; Asts: Boogie Fland - 5

O'Connell Center • Gainesville, Florida
Attendance: 10,182
Referees: Keith Kimble, Byron Jarrett, Joe Lindsay

=== at Oklahoma ===
ESPN2

January 13, 2026
9:00 p.m. EST

Recap

No. 19 Florida Gators 96, Oklahoma Sooners 79
Scoring by half: 46-24, 50-55
Pts: Thomas Haugh - 21; Rebs: Rueben Chinyelu - 12; Asts: Boogie Fland - 7	Pts: Xzayvier Brown - 24; Rebs: Tae Davis - 8 Asts: Tae Davis - 4

Lloyd Noble Center • Norman, Oklahoma
Attendance: 5,866
Referees: Lee Cassell, Steven Anderson, Don Daily

=== at Vanderbilt ===
ESPN

January 17, 2026
2:00 p.m. EST

Recap

No. 19 Florida Gators 98, No. 10 Vanderbilt Commodores 94
Scoring by half: 44-45, 54-49
Pts: Tied - 20; Rebs: Rueben Chinyelu - 10; Asts: Tied - 3	Pts: Tyler Tanner - 20; Rebs: Duke Miles - 6 Asts: Tyler Tanner - 5

Memorial Gymasium • Nashville, Tennessee
Attendance: 14,316
Referees: Wil Howard, Courtney Green, Doug Shows

=== vs LSU ===
ESPN2

January 20, 2026
7:00 p.m. EST

Recap

LSU Tigers 61, No. 16 Florida Gators 79
Scoring by half: 26-38, 35-41
Pts: Michael Nwoko - 17; Rebs: Marquel Sutton - 7 Asts: Tied - 3	Pts: Urban Klavžar - 18; Rebs: Rueben Chinyelu - 21; Asts: Boogie Fland - 4

O'Connell Center • Gainesville, Florida
Attendance: 10,593
Referees: Vladimir Voyard-Tadal, Todd Austin, K.B. Burdett Jr.

=== vs Auburn ===
ESPN

January 24, 2026
4:00 p.m. EST

Recap

Auburn Tigers 76, No. 16 Florida Gators 67
Scoring by half: 43-28, 33-39
Pts: Keyshawn Hall - 24; Rebs: KeShawn Murphy - 9 Asts: Keyshawn Hall - 4	Pts: Thomas Haugh - 27; Rebs: Thomas Haugh - 10; Asts: Boogie Fland - 5

O'Connell Center • Gainesville, Florida
Attendance: 11,104
Referees: Lucas Santos, Olandis Poole, Pat Adams

=== at South Carolina ===
SECN

January 28, 2026
9:00 p.m. EST

Recap

No. 19 Florida Gators 95, South Carolina Gamecocks 48
Scoring by half: 48-20, 47-28
Pts: Thomas Haugh - 18; Rebs: Rueben Chinyelu - 11; Asts: Xaivian Lee - 9	Pts: Eli Ellis - 13; Rebs: EJ Walker - 6 Asts: Meechie Johnson - 2

Colonial Life Arena • Columbia, South Carolina
Attendance: 12,686
Referees: Jeb Hartness, Brian Dorsey, Bharat Ramnanan

=== vs Alabama ===
ABC

February 1, 2026
1:00 p.m. EST

Recap

No. 23 Alabama Crimson Tide 77, No. 19 Florida Gators' 100
Scoring by half: 36-46, 41-54
Pts: Aden Holloway - 19; Rebs: Charles Bediako - 7 Asts: Aiden Sherrell - 5	Pts: Alex Condon - 25; Rebs: Rueben Chinyelu - 17; Asts: Boogie Fland - 8

O'Connell Center • Gainesville, Florida
Attendance: 10,627
Referees: Courtney Green, Owen Shortt, K.B. Burdett Jr.

=== at Texas A&M ===
SECN

February 7, 2026
8:30 p.m. EST

Recap

No. 17 Florida Gators 86, Texas A&M Aggies 67
Scoring by half: 30-19, 56-48
Pts: Thomas Haugh - 22; Rebs: Rueben Chinyelu - 16; Asts: Boogie Fland - 4	Pts: Tied - 17; Rebs: Rashaun Agee - 11; Asts: Rashaun Agee - 5

Reed Arena • College Station, Texas
Attendance: 12,831
Referees: Joe Lindsay, Olandis Poole, Lucas Santos

=== at Georgia ===
ESPN2

February 11, 2026
7:00 p.m. EST

No. 14 Florida Gators 86, Georgia Bulldogs 66
Scoring by half: 43-27, 43-39
Pts: Xaivian Lee - 18; Rebs: Rueben Chinyelu - 20; Asts: Xaivian Lee - 7	Pts: Blue Cain - 17; Rebs: Blue Cain - 11; Asts: Marcus Millender - 5

Stegeman Coliseum • Athens, Georgia
Attendance: 10,034
Referees: Keith Kimble, Courtney Green, K.B. Burdett Jr.

== Rankings ==
Ranking movements Legend: ██ Increase in ranking ██ Decrease in ranking RV = Received votes т = Tied with team above or below ( ) = First-place votes
	Week																				
Poll	Pre	1	2	3	4	5	6	7	8	9	10	11	12	13	14	15	16	17	18	19	Final
AP	3 (8)	10	10	10	15	18	23т	22	22	RV	19	16	19	17	14	12	7	5	4	4	9
Coaches	3 (1)	10	9	8	14	18	21	22	22	RV	20	16	21	16	14	11	7	5	4	4	9
