= College Basketball Crown =

College basketball tournament

- Current season, competition or edition: 2026 College Basketball Crown
- Tournament logo
- Sport: College basketball
- Founded: 2024
- Founder: Anschutz Entertainment Group; Fox Sports
- First season: 2025
- No. of teams: 16 (2025); 8 (2026)
- Country: United States
- Venues: T-Mobile Arena; MGM Grand Garden Arena
- Most recent champion: West Virginia (1st title)
- Most titles: Tie: Nebraska, West Virginia (1)
- Broadcasters: Fox; FS1
- Related competitions: NCAA Division I men's basketball tournament National Invitation Tournament
- Website: College Basketball Crown

The College Basketball Crown (CBC) is an American men's college basketball tournament promoted by Anschutz Entertainment Group and Fox Sports. It is held in March and April at two venues on the Las Vegas Strip in Paradise, Nevada: T-Mobile Arena and MGM Grand Garden Arena.

The Nebraska Cornhuskers won the inaugural tournament, while the West Virginia Mountaineers are the defending champions.

== Selection process ==
Two automatic qualifiers from the Big East Conference, Big Ten Conference and Big 12 Conference, as well as ten at-large teams, will be selected from the pool of teams that did not qualify for the NCAA tournament. Although the official announcement of the launching of the tournament provided no details regarding selection criteria, a September 2023 proposal for the tournament indicated that NCAA Evaluation Tool (NET) rankings would be used to select teams, which, at the time, was expected to include only Big East, Big Ten and Big 12 squads. Further, the proposal indicated that teams selected from those three conferences would be required to participate in the CBC, which would make it impossible for them to be in the National Invitation Tournament (NIT), or any other postseason tournament, should they receive a bid.

The National Collegiate Athletic Association (NCAA) does not allow schools invited to an NCAA championship tournament to decline participation and then compete in another postseason event; however, this rule does not apply to the NIT, a secondary post-season competition administered by the NCAA. In response to attempts to launch the CBC during the 2024 season, the NCAA changed its NIT selection process, introducing automatic bids for teams from high-major conferences while eliminating the automatic bids formerly reserved for teams who won their conference's regular-season title but lost their conference tournament (usually mid-major teams). These changes were criticized by many, including mid-major schools, with the NCAA calling them "a preemptive attempt to keep the NIT viable long-term."

Ahead of the 2025 NIT, the NCAA revoked the two automatic bids previously given to the Big East, Big Ten and Big 12 (the conferences committed to participate in the CBC), leaving two automatic bids only for the Atlantic Coast Conference (ACC) and Southeastern Conference (SEC). The NIT also guaranteed one bid to each of the twelve conferences other than the ACC and SEC with the highest KenPom rating. Finally, regular-season conference champions not in the NCAA tournament qualified for an automatic bid to the NIT, if their "KNIT" score, an average of seven different metrics (Bart Torvik "T-Rank" Ranking (BTR), ESPN Basketball Power Index (BPI), KenPom, Kevin Pauga Index (KPI), NET, Strength of Record (SOR, as calculated by ESPN), and Wins Above Bubble (WAB, as calculated by Torvik)), is at or above 125.

If the top two non-NCAA tournament teams from each of the Big East, Big Ten and Big 12 are all committed to play in the CBC, and those three conferences all rank (according to KenPom) in the top twelve conferences, the NIT would be unable to get a team better than the third best non-NCAA tournament team from each of those three leagues. Since the CBC has ten at-large bids, it may extend some of those bids to ACC and SEC teams, which could further dilute the quality of teams participating in the NIT, if those teams were to accept a bid to the CBC.

Non-NCAA tournament teams from the Big East, Big Ten and Big 12 conferences are contractually prohibited from playing in any other postseason tournament, including the NIT, if they declined an invitation or removed themselves from consideration for a bid to the College Basketball Crown.

Ahead of the 2026 offering, AEG and Fox Sports announced that they had "streamlined" the event by eliminating eight of the ten at-large bids and therefore condensing the field of teams from sixteen to eight.

== Champions ==
Year	Champion	Runner-up	MVP
2025	Nebraska	UCF	Juwan Gary, Nebraska
2026	West Virginia	Oklahoma	Honor Huff, West Virginia

== See also ==
- Vegas 16 – an earlier 16-team invitational tournament in Las Vegas
