= 2025–26 Alabama Crimson Tide men's basketball team =

American college basketball team

2025–26 Alabama Crimson Tide men's basketball

NCAA tournament, Sweet Sixteen
- Conference: Southeastern Conference

Ranking
- Coaches: No. 16
- AP: No. 16
- Record: 25–10 (13–5 SEC)
- Head coach: Nate Oats (7th season)
- Assistant coaches: Preston Murphy (3rd season); Chris Fleming (1st season); Brian Adams (2nd season)
- Home arena: Coleman Coliseum

2025–26 Southeastern Conference men's basketball standings
	Conf.				Overall
Team	W		L	PCT	W		L	PCT
No. 9 Florida	16	–	2	.889	27	–	8	.771
No. 16 Alabama	13	–	5	.722	25	–	10	.714
No. 13 Arkansas †	13	–	5	.722	28	–	9	.757
No. 19 Vanderbilt	11	–	7	.611	27	–	9	.750
No. 12 Tennessee	11	–	7	.611	25	–	12	.676
Texas A&M	11	–	7	.611	22	–	12	.647
Georgia	10	–	8	.556	22	–	11	.667
Missouri	10	–	8	.556	20	–	13	.606
Kentucky	10	–	8	.556	22	–	14	.611
No. 22 Texas	9	–	9	.500	21	–	15	.583
Oklahoma	7	–	11	.389	21	–	16	.568
Auburn	7	–	11	.389	22	–	16	.579
Mississippi State	5	–	13	.278	13	–	19	.406
South Carolina	4	–	14	.222	13	–	19	.406
Ole Miss	4	–	14	.222	15	–	20	.429
LSU	3	–	15	.167	15	–	17	.469
† 2026 SEC tournament winner Rankings from AP poll

The 2025–26 Alabama Crimson Tide men's basketball team represented the University of Alabama during the 2025–26 NCAA Division I men's basketball season. The Crimson Tide, led by seventh-year head coach Nate Oats, played their home games at Coleman Coliseum located in Tuscaloosa, Alabama as a member of the SEC.

== Previous season ==
The Crimson Tide finished the 2024–25 season with a record of 28–9, 13–5 in SEC play to finish in third place. In the SEC tournament, they defeated Kentucky in the quarterfinals before falling to Florida for a second year in a row, this time in the semifinals. They received an at-large bid to the NCAA tournament as the number two seed in the East Region, where they defeated Robert Morris in the first round, Saint Mary's in the second round and BYU in the Sweet Sixteen before falling to Duke in the Elite Eight.

== Offseason ==
=== Departures ===
Alabama departures
Name	Number	Pos.	Height	Weight	Year	Hometown	Reason for departures
Mark Sears	1	G	6'1"	190	GS Senior	Muscle Shoals, AL	Graduated/undrafted, signed with the Milwaukee Bucks
Grant Nelson	4	F	6'11"	230	GS Senior	Devils Lake, ND	Graduated
Chris Youngblood	8	G	6'4"	223	GS Senior	Tuscaloosa, AL	Graduated/undrafted, signed with the Oklahoma City Thunder
Mouhamed Dioubate	10	F	6'7"	215	Sophomore	Queens, NY	Transferred to Kentucky
Clifford Omoruyi	11	C	6'11"	250	GS Senior	Benin City, Nigeria	Graduated, signed with Maccabi Tel Aviv B.C.
Jarin Stevenson	15	F	6'11"	215	Sophomore	Chapel Hill, NC	Transferred to North Carolina
Naas Cunningham	24	F	6'7"	175	(redshirt) Freshman	Orange, NJ	Transferred to UNLV
Derrion Reid	35	F	6'8"	220	Freshman	Grovetown, GA	Transferred to Oklahoma
Max Scharnowski	45	F	6'6"	205	GS Senior	Elgin, IL	Graduated

=== Incoming transfers ===
Alabama incoming transfers
Name	Number	Pos.	Height	Weight	Year	Hometown	Previous School
Taylor Bol Bowen	7	F	6'10"	202	Junior	Jericho, VT	Florida State
Jalil Bethea	1	G	6'5"	190	Sophomore	Philadelphia, PA	Miami (FL)
Noah Williamson	15	C	7'0"	255	Senior	Riga, Latvia	Bucknell
Keitenn Bristow	10	F	6'10"	205	Sophomore	Wichita Falls, TX	Tarleton State
Preston Murphy Jr.	11	G	6'1"	180	Junior	Barrington, R.I.	Northern Oklahoma College

=== Recruiting class ===
==== 2025 recruiting class ====
College recruiting information
Name	Hometown	School	Height	Weight	Commit date
London Jemison; PF	Bloomfield, CT	St. Thomas More School	6 ft 7 in (2.01 m)	195 lb (88 kg)	Sep 22, 2024
London Jemison; PF	Recruit ratings: Rivals: 247Sports: On3: ESPN: (86)				
Davion Hannah; SG	Milwaukee, WI	Link Academy (MO)	6 ft 4 in (1.93 m)	180 lb (82 kg)	Nov 15, 2024
Davion Hannah; SG	Recruit ratings: Rivals: 247Sports: On3: ESPN: (86)				
Amari Allen; SF	Green Bay, WI	Ashwaubenon (WI)	6 ft 5 in (1.96 m)	180 lb (82 kg)	Sep 10, 2024
Amari Allen; SF	Recruit ratings: Rivals: 247Sports: On3: ESPN: (81)				
Collins Onyejiaka; C	Edo, Nigeria	The Newman School (MA)	6 ft 11 in (2.11 m)	270 lb (120 kg)	Jun 20, 2025
Collins Onyejiaka; C	Recruit ratings: Rivals: 247Sports: On3: ESPN: (n/a)				
Overall recruit ranking:
Note: In many cases, Scout, Rivals, 247Sports, On3, and ESPN may conflict in their listings of height and weight.; In these cases, the average was taken. ESPN grades are on a 100-point scale.; Sources: "Alabama 2025 Basketball Commitments". Rivals.; "2025 Alabama Crimson Tide Recruiting Class". ESPN.; "2025 Team Ranking". Rivals.; "2025 Alabama 24/7 Sports Commits". 247Sports.; "2025 Alabama Crimson Tide Basketball Industry Comparison Commits". On3.

== Roster ==
2025–26 Alabama Crimson Tide men's basketball team
Players
Coaches

Pos.	#	Name	Height	Weight	Year	Previous school	Hometown
G	0	Labaron Philon Jr.	6 ft 4 in (1.93 m)	185 lb (84 kg)	So	Link Academy (MO)	Mobile, AL
G	1	Jalil Bethea	6 ft 5 in (1.96 m)	190 lb (86 kg)	So	Miami (FL)	Philadelphia, PA
G	2	Aden Holloway (S)	6 ft 1 in (1.85 m)	180 lb (82 kg)	Jr	Auburn (AL)	Charlotte, NC
G	3	Latrell Wrightsell Jr.	6 ft 3 in (1.91 m)	195 lb (88 kg)	GS	Cal State Fullerton (CA)	Omaha, NE
G	4	Davion Hannah	6 ft 6 in (1.98 m)	190 lb (86 kg)	Fr	Link Academy (MO)	Milwaukee, WI
F	5	Amari Allen	6 ft 8 in (2.03 m)	205 lb (93 kg)	Fr	Ashwaubenon (WI)	Green Bay, WI
F	6	London Jemison	6 ft 8 in (2.03 m)	205 lb (93 kg)	Fr	St. Thomas More	Bloomfield, CT
F	7	Taylor Bol Bowen	6 ft 10 in (2.08 m)	202 lb (92 kg)	Jr	Florida State (FL)	Jericho, VT
F	10	Keitenn Bristow	6 ft 10 in (2.08 m)	205 lb (93 kg)	So	Tarleton State	Wichita Falls, TX
G	11	Preston Murphy Jr.	6 ft 1 in (1.85 m)	180 lb (82 kg)	Jr	Northern Oklahoma College (OK)	Barrington, RI
C	14	Charles Bediako (I)	7 ft 0 in (2.13 m)	225 lb (102 kg)	Sr	IMG Academy	Brampton, ON, Canada
C	15	Noah Williamson	7 ft 0 in (2.13 m)	255 lb (116 kg)	Jr	Bucknell (PA)	Riga, Latvia
F	22	Aiden Sherrell	6 ft 11 in (2.11 m)	255 lb (116 kg)	So	Prolific Prep (CA)	Detroit, MI
C	34	Collins Onyejiaka	6 ft 11 in (2.11 m)	265 lb (120 kg)	Fr	The Newman School (MA)	Edo, Nigeria
G	95	Houston Mallette	6 ft 5 in (1.96 m)	202 lb (92 kg)	GS	Pepperdine	Alameda, CA

Head coach

- Nate Oats (Maranatha Baptist)

Assistant coach(es)

- Preston Murphy (Rhode Island)
- Chris Fleming (Richmond)
- Brian Adams (Connecticut College)

Legend

- (C) Team captain
- (S) Suspended
- (I) Ineligible
- (W) Walk-on
- Injured
- Current redshirt

Roster
Last update: January 24, 2026

Former Alabama center Charles Bediako made a brief return to the Crimson Tide during the season while on a temporary restraining order. He attempted to regain college eligibility to play out one final college season. He appeared in five games between January 24 and February 7, helping the team go 3–2 over that stretch.

== Schedule and results ==
Date time, TV	Rank^{#}	Opponent^{#}	Result	Record	High points	High rebounds	High assists	Site (attendance) city, state
Exhibition
October 16, 2025*; 7:00 p.m., YouTube	No. 15	vs. Florida State	W 109–105	–	28 – Philon Jr.	7 – Tied	4 – Philon Jr.	Boutwell Memorial Auditorium (2,463); Birmingham, AL
October 26, 2025*; 2:00 p.m., ESPN+	No. 15	at Furman	W 96–71	–	18 – Holloway	9 – Allen	5 – Philon Jr.	Timmons Arena (2,750); Greenville, SC
Non-Conference Regular Season
November 3, 2025*; 7:00 p.m., SECN+	No. 15	North Dakota	W 91–62	1–0	22 – Philon Jr.	8 – Mallette	8 – Philon Jr.	Coleman Coliseum (13,474); Tuscaloosa, AL
November 8, 2025*; 11:00 a.m., FS1	No. 15	at No. 5 St. John's	W 103–96	2–0	25 – Philon Jr.	10 – Allen	4 – Holloway	Madison Square Garden (17,319); New York, NY
November 13, 2025*; 6:00 p.m., ESPN2	No. 8	No. 2 Purdue	L 80–87	2–1	21 – Holloway	4 – Sherrell	7 – Philon Jr.	Coleman Coliseum (13,474); Tuscaloosa, AL
November 19, 2025*; 8:00 p.m., FS1	No. 11	vs. No. 8 Illinois	W 90–86	3–1	24 – Philon Jr.	11 – Allen	5 – Philon Jr.	United Center (17,775); Chicago, IL
November 24, 2025*; 8:30 p.m., TNT	No. 8	vs. No. 12 Gonzaga; Players Era Festival Game 1	L 85–95	3–2	29 – Philon Jr.	11 – Bristow	7 – Philon Jr.	MGM Grand Garden Arena; Las Vegas, NV
November 25, 2025*; 11:00 p.m., TruTV	No. 8	vs. UNLV; Players Era Festival Game 2	W 115–76	4–2	26 – Holloway	8 – Sherrell	6 – Allen	MGM Grand Garden Arena (2,799); Las Vegas, NV
November 26, 2025*; 11:00 p.m., TNT	No. 8	vs. Maryland; Players Era Festival Consolation Game	W 105–72	5–2	20 – Philon Jr.	9 – Sherrell	10 – Holloway	MGM Grand Garden Arena (3,947); Las Vegas, NV
December 3, 2025; 6:00 p.m., ESPNU	No. 12	Clemson; ACC–SEC Challenge	W 90–84	6–2	29 – Philon Jr.	11 – Allen	4 – Allen	Coleman Coliseum (13,474); Tuscaloosa, AL
December 7, 2025*; 1:00 p.m., SECN	No. 12	UTSA	W 97–55	7–2	21 – Bethea	11 – Sherrell	6 – Philon Jr.	Coleman Coliseum (13,474); Tuscaloosa, AL
December 13, 2025*; 8:30 p.m., ESPN	No. 12	vs. No. 1 Arizona; C.M. Newton Classic	L 75–96	7–3	24 – Philon Jr.	10 – Philon Jr.	5 – Philon Jr.	Legacy Arena (14,948); Birmingham, AL
December 17, 2025*; 7:00 p.m., SECN+	No. 16	South Florida	W 104–93	8–3	29 – Philon Jr.	9 – Bol Bowen	7 – Philon Jr.	Coleman Coliseum (11,256); Tuscaloosa, AL
December 21, 2025*; 1:00 p.m., SECN+	No. 16	vs. Kennesaw State; Rocket City Classic	W 92–81	9–3	21 – Sherrell	8 – Allen	6 – Philon Jr.	Propst Arena (4,520); Huntsville, AL
December 29, 2025*; 7:00 p.m., SECN+	No. 14	Yale	W 102–78	10–3	26 – Holloway	9 – Tied	7 – Holloway	Coleman Coliseum (12,626); Tuscaloosa, AL
SEC regular season
January 3, 2026; 11:00 a.m., ESPN	No. 14	Kentucky	W 89–74	11–3 (1–0)	26 – Holloway	9 – Allen	5 – Holloway	Coleman Coliseum (13,474); Tuscaloosa, AL
January 6, 2026; 8:00 p.m., ESPN2	No. 13	at No. 11 Vanderbilt	L 90–96	11–4 (1–1)	25 – Allen	11 – Tied	4 – Allen	Memorial Gymnasium (11,429); Nashville, TN
January 10, 2026; 7:00 p.m., ESPN	No. 13	Texas	L 88–92	11–5 (1–2)	21 – Philon Jr.	10 – Bol Bowen	5 – Philon Jr.	Coleman Coliseum (13,474); Tuscaloosa, AL
January 13, 2026; 8:00 p.m., SECN	No. 18	at Mississippi State	W 97–82	12–5 (2–2)	32 – Philon Jr.	13 – Allen	4 – Allen	Humphrey Coliseum (9,212); Starkville, MS
January 17, 2026; 12:00 p.m., SECN	No. 18	at Oklahoma	W 83–81	13–5 (3–2)	23 – Philon Jr.	9 – Sherrell	4 – Philon Jr.	Lloyd Noble Center (7,922); Norman, OK
January 24, 2026; 7:30 p.m., ESPN	No. 17	Tennessee	L 73–79	13–6 (3–3)	26 – Philon Jr.	8 – Mallette	7 – Philon Jr.	Coleman Coliseum (13,474); Tuscaloosa, AL
January 27, 2026; 7:00 p.m., SECN	No. 23	Missouri	W 90–64	14–6 (4–3)	21 – Wrightsell	10 – Bol Bowen	8 – Holloway	Coleman Coliseum (13,474); Tuscaloosa, AL
February 1, 2026; 12:00 p.m., ABC	No. 23	at No. 19 Florida	L 77–100	14–7 (4–4)	19 – Holloway	7 – Bediako	5 – Sherell	O'Connell Center (10,627); Gainesville, FL
February 4, 2026; 6:00 p.m., SECN		Texas A&M	W 100–97	15–7 (5–4)	20 – Holloway	8 – Sherrell	6 – Allen	Coleman Coliseum (13,474); Tuscaloosa, AL
February 7, 2026; 3:00 p.m., ESPN2		at Auburn; Rivalry	W 96–92	16–7 (6–4)	25 – Philon Jr.	6 – Allen	6 – Philon Jr.	Neville Arena (9,121); Auburn, AL
February 11, 2026; 6:00 p.m., SECN		at Ole Miss	W 93–74	17–7 (7–4)	21 – Wrightsell Jr.	8 – Allen	6 – Tied	SJB Pavilion (8,148); Oxford, MS
February 14, 2026; 7:30 p.m., SECN		South Carolina	W 89–75	18–7 (8–4)	20 – Holloway	10 – Allen	6 – Philon Jr.	Coleman Coliseum (13,474); Tuscaloosa, AL
February 18, 2026; 6:00 p.m., ESPN	No. 25	No. 20 Arkansas	W 117–115 ^{2OT}	19–7 (9–4)	35 – Philon Jr.	13 – Sherrell	7 – Philon Jr.	Coleman Coliseum (13,474); Tuscaloosa, AL
February 21, 2026; 5:00 p.m., SECN	No. 25	at LSU	W 90–83	20–7 (10–4)	17 – Holloway	10 – Sherrell	5 – Philon Jr.	Pete Maravich Assembly Center (7,105); Baton Rouge, LA
February 25, 2026; 8:00 p.m., ESPNU	No. 17	Mississippi State	W 100–75	21–7 (11–4)	23 – Allen	7 – Holloway	10 – Holloway	Coleman Coliseum (13,474); Tuscaloosa, AL
February 28, 2026; 5:00 p.m., ESPN	No. 17	at No. 22 Tennessee	W 71–69	22–7 (12–4)	25 – Wrightsell	8 – Sherrell	2 – Tied	Thompson-Boling Arena (21,678); Knoxville, TN
March 3, 2026; 5:30 p.m., ESPNEWS	No. 16	at Georgia	L 88–98	22–8 (12–5)	26 – Philon Jr.	5 – Wrightsell	4 – Sherrell	Stegeman Coliseum (10,523); Athens, GA
March 7, 2026; 7:30 p.m., ESPN	No. 16	Auburn; Rivalry	W 96–84	23–8 (13–5)	21 – Tied	7 – Tied	4 – Philon Jr.	Coleman Coliseum (13,474); Tuscaloosa, AL
SEC tournament
March 13, 2026; 6:00 p.m., SECN	(2) No. 15	vs. (15) Ole Miss; Quarterfinal	L 79–80	23–9	28 – Philon Jr.	11 – Allen	4 – Philon Jr.	Bridgestone Arena (15,085); Nashville, TN
NCAA tournament
March 20, 2026; 2:15 p.m., TruTV	(4 MW) No. 18	vs. (13 MW) Hofstra; First round	W 90–70	24–9	29 – Philon Jr.	11 – Sherrell	7 – Philon Jr.	Benchmark International Arena (17,769); Tampa, FL
March 22, 2026; 8:45 p.m., TBS	(4 MW) No. 18	vs. (5 MW) No. 20 Texas Tech; Second round	W 90–65	25–9	24 – Wrightsell	8 – Mallette	12 – Philon Jr.	Benchmark International Arena (17,996); Tampa, FL
March 27, 2026; 6:35 p.m., TBS/TruTV	(4 MW) No. 18	vs. (1 MW) No. 3 Michigan; Sweet Sixteen	L 77–90	25–10	35 – Philon Jr.	7 – Philon Jr.	4 – Philon Jr.	United Center (21,508); Chicago, IL
*Non-conference game. ^{#}Rankings from AP poll. (#) Tournament seedings in parentheses. MW=Midwest. All times are in Central Time.

== Rankings ==
Ranking movements Legend: ██ Increase in ranking ██ Decrease in ranking RV = Received votes
	Week																				
Poll	Pre	1	2	3	4	5	6	7	8	9	10	11	12	13	14	15	16	17	18	19	Final
AP	15	8	11	8	12	12	16	14	14	13	18	17	23	RV	RV	25	17	16	15	18	16
Coaches	16	9	11	9	12	12	16	15	15	12	18	17	23	RV	RV	RV	18	16	15	18	16
