= 2025–26 Oklahoma Sooners men's basketball team =

College basketball season

2025–26 Oklahoma Sooners men's basketball

College Basketball Crown, Runners-up
- Conference: Southeastern Conference
- Record: 21–16 (7–11 SEC)
- Head coach: Porter Moser (5th season)
- Assistant coaches: Justin Scott (1st season); Ryan Humphrey (4th season); Brock Morris (3rd season); Clayton Custer (3rd season)
- Home arena: Lloyd Noble Center

2025–26 Southeastern Conference men's basketball standings
	Conf.				Overall
Team	W		L	PCT	W		L	PCT
No. 9 Florida	16	–	2	.889	27	–	8	.771
No. 16 Alabama	13	–	5	.722	25	–	10	.714
No. 13 Arkansas †	13	–	5	.722	28	–	9	.757
No. 19 Vanderbilt	11	–	7	.611	27	–	9	.750
No. 12 Tennessee	11	–	7	.611	25	–	12	.676
Texas A&M	11	–	7	.611	22	–	12	.647
Georgia	10	–	8	.556	22	–	11	.667
Missouri	10	–	8	.556	20	–	13	.606
Kentucky	10	–	8	.556	22	–	14	.611
No. 22 Texas	9	–	9	.500	21	–	15	.583
Oklahoma	7	–	11	.389	21	–	16	.568
Auburn	7	–	11	.389	22	–	16	.579
Mississippi State	5	–	13	.278	13	–	19	.406
South Carolina	4	–	14	.222	13	–	19	.406
Ole Miss	4	–	14	.222	15	–	20	.429
LSU	3	–	15	.167	15	–	17	.469
† 2026 SEC tournament winner Rankings from AP poll

The 2025–26 Oklahoma Sooners men's basketball team represented the University of Oklahoma during the 2025–26 NCAA Division I men's basketball season. The Sooners were led by head coach Porter Moser in his fifth year, and played their home games at Lloyd Noble Center in Norman, Oklahoma, as members of the Southeastern Conference (SEC).

== Previous season ==
The Sooners finished the 2024–25 season 20–14, 6–12 in SEC Play to finish fourteenth place. They were defeated by Kentucky, 85–84, in the second round of the SEC tournament. They received an at-large bid to the NCAA tournament, where they lost 67–59 in the first round to UConn.

== Offseason ==
=== Departures ===
==== NBA draft ====
Player	Position
Jeremiah Fears	Guard

==== Outgoing transfers ====
Player	Position	Height	Weight	Year	New team
Yaya Keita	PF	6'9	240	Redshirt junior	Albany
Luke Northweather	C	6'11	240	Redshirt sophomore	Missouri
Jacolb Fredson-Cole	PF	6'7	185	Redshirt freshman	McNeese State
Duke Miles	G	6'2	170	Senior	Vanderbilt

=== Additions ===
==== Incoming transfers ====
Player	Position	Height	Weight	Year	Former team
Tae Davis	PF	6'9	240	Junior	Notre Dame
Nijel Pack	PG	6'0	180	Senior	Miami
Xzayvier Brown	PG	6'1	175	Sophomore	Saint Joseph's
Derrion Reid	SF	6'7	200	Freshman	Alabama
Kirill Elatontsev	C	6'11	240	Senior	PBC Lokomotiv Kuban

==== Recruiting ====
College recruiting
Name	Hometown	School	Height	Weight	Commit date
Andreas Holst; PF	Copenhagen, Denmark	Bears Academy	7 ft 0 in (2.13 m)	200 lb (91 kg)	Sep 16, 2024
Andreas Holst; PF	Recruit ratings: Rivals:				
Alec Blair; SF	Concord, California	De La Salle High School	6 ft 6 in (1.98 m)	180 lb (82 kg)	Jul 23, 2024
Alec Blair; SF	Recruit ratings: Rivals: 247Sports: ESPN: (84)				
Kai Rogers; C	Milwaukee, Wisconsin	Overtime Elite	6 ft 10 in (2.08 m)	230 lb (100 kg)	Oct 11, 2024
Kai Rogers; C	Recruit ratings: Rivals: 247Sports: ESPN: (82)				

== Roster ==
2025–26 Oklahoma Sooners men's basketball team
Players
Coaches

Pos.	#	Name	Height	Weight	Year	Previous school	Hometown
G	0	Jake Hansen	6 ft 0 in (1.83 m)	170 lb (77 kg)	Fr	Wauwatosa West High School	Wauwatosa, WI
G	1	Xzayvier Brown	6 ft 2 in (1.88 m)	182 lb (83 kg)	Jr	Saint Joseph's	Philadelphia, PA
F	2	Andreas Holst	7 ft 0 in (2.13 m)	200 lb (91 kg)	Fr	Bakken Bears	Copenhagen,DK
F	3	Jeff Nwankwo	6 ft 6 in (1.98 m)	210 lb (95 kg)	RS Sr	Cowley Community College	Oklahoma City, OK
F	5	Mohammed Wague	6 ft 10 in (2.08 m)	225 lb (102 kg)	GS	Alabama	Bronx, NY
F	6	Finley Keefe	6 ft 7 in (2.01 m)	200 lb (91 kg)	Fr	The Skill Factory Prep	Novato, CA
G	7	Dayton Forsythe	6 ft 2 in (1.88 m)	187 lb (85 kg)	So	Dale High School	Dale, OK
F/C	8	Kai Rogers	6 ft 10 in (2.08 m)	247 lb (112 kg)	Fr	Overtime Elite (GA)	Wauwatosa, WI
G	9	Nijel Pack	5 ft 10 in (1.78 m)	190 lb (86 kg)	Sr	Miami	Indianpolis, IN
G	12	Jadon Jones	6 ft 5 in (1.96 m)	190 lb (86 kg)	GS	Long Beach State	Long Beach, CA
F	13	Tae Davis	6 ft 9 in (2.06 m)	215 lb (98 kg)	Sr	Notre Dame	Indianapolis, IN
C	15	Kirill Elatontsev	6 ft 11 in (2.11 m)	240 lb (109 kg)	Sr	PBC Lokomotiv Kuban	Krasnoyarsk, Russia
F	22	Kuol Atak	6 ft 9 in (2.06 m)	192 lb (87 kg)	RS Fr	Haltom High School	Fort Worth, TX
F	35	Derrion Reid	6 ft 8 in (2.03 m)	226 lb (103 kg)	So	Alabama	Grovetown, GA
G	55	Reid Lovelace (W)	5 ft 10 in (1.78 m)	140 lb (64 kg)	Sr	Crossings Christian School	Oklahoma City, OK

Head coach

- Porter Moser (Creighton)

Assistant coach(es)

- Clayton Custer (Loyola Chicago)
- Ryan Humphrey (Notre Dame)
- Brock Morris (Snead State)
- Josh Oppenheimer (Cal State Dominguez)
- Justin Scott (East Stroudsburg)

Legend

- (C) Team captain
- (S) Suspended
- (I) Ineligible
- (W) Walk-on
- Injured
- Current redshirt

Roster
Last update: June 9, 2025

== Schedule and results ==
Date time, TV	Rank^{#}	Opponent^{#}	Result	Record	High points	High rebounds	High assists	Site (attendance) city, state
Exhibition
October 24, 2025*; 7:00 p.m., B1G+		at No. 24 Wisconsin; The Bad Boy Mowers Series - Milwaukee	W 84–83	–	18 – Brown	6 – Wague	5 – Brown	Fiserv Forum (2,344); Milwaukee, WI
Non-conference regular season
November 3, 2025*; 7:30 p.m., SECN+/ESPN+		Saint Francis	W 102–66	1–0	18 – Atak	10 – Wague	6 – Brown	Lloyd Noble Center (6,476); Norman, OK
November 8, 2025*; 9:30 p.m., ESPN2		vs. No. 21 Gonzaga; The Bad Boy Mowers Series - Spokane	L 68–83	1–1	21 – Brown	8 – Davis	1 – Tied	Spokane Arena (11,081); Spokane, WA
November 11, 2025*; 7:00 p.m., SECN+/ESPN+		Arkansas–Pine Bluff; McCasland Student Game	W 95–69	2–1	19 – Brown	15 – Davis	4 – Davis	McCasland Field House (3,269); Norman, OK
November 15, 2025*; 6:00 p.m., BTN		vs. Nebraska	L 99–105	2–2	27 – Pack	7 – Reid	4 – Tied	Sanford Pentagon (3,463); Sioux Falls, SD
November 20, 2025*; 7:00 p.m., SECN+/ESPN+		Oral Roberts	W 95–71	3–2	20 – Wague	7 – Wague	4 – Brown	Lloyd Noble Center (5,765); Norman, OK
November 23, 2025*; 1:00 p.m., SECN+/ESPN+		Alcorn State	W 72–53	4–2	17 – Pack	8 – Tied	5 – Pack	Lloyd Noble Center (4,746); Norman, OK
November 28, 2025*; 1:00 p.m., NBC		vs. Marquette; The Bad Boy Mowers Series - Chicago	W 75–74	5–2	24 – Pack	11 – Davis	5 – Davis	Credit Union 1 Arena (2,587); Chicago, IL
December 2, 2025*; 6:00 p.m., ACCN		at Wake Forest; ACC–SEC Challenge	W 86–68	6–2	18 – Reid	14 – Wague	5 – Brown	LJVM Coliseum (7,216); Winston-Salem, NC
December 6, 2025*; 9:00 p.m., CBSSN		vs. Arizona State; Jerry Colangelo Classic	L 70–86	6–3	12 – Atak	7 – Wague	4 – Brown	Mortgage Matchup Center (4,856); Phoenix, AZ
December 13, 2025*; 12:00 p.m., FOX		vs. Oklahoma State; Bedlam Series	W 85–76	7–3	21 – Brown	10 – Davis	5 – Brown	Paycom Center (10,552); Oklahoma City, OK
December 16, 2025*; 6:00 p.m., SECN		Kansas City	W 89–67	8–3	21 – Brown	4 – Tied	4 – Tied	Lloyd Noble Center (4,410); Norman, OK
December 22, 2025*; 8:00 p.m., SECN		Stetson	W 107–54	9–3	22 – Reid	9 – Wague	6 – Davis	Lloyd Noble Center (4,646); Norman, OK
December 29, 2025*; 7:00 p.m., SECN+/ESPN+		Mississippi Valley State	W 93–69	10–3	24 – Atak	5 – Tied	7 – Pack	Lloyd Noble Center (4,866); Norman, OK
SEC regular season
January 3, 2026; 2:30 p.m., SECN		Ole Miss	W 86–70	11–3 (1–0)	23 – Brown	15 – Wague	6 – Davis	Lloyd Noble Center (7,040); Norman, OK
January 7, 2026; 6:00 p.m., SECN		at Mississippi State	L 53–72	11–4 (1–1)	13 – Tied	7 – Tied	4 – Brown	Humphrey Coliseum (6,883); Starkville, MS
January 10, 2026; 2:30 p.m., SECN		at Texas A&M	L 76–83	11–5 (1–2)	24 – Pack	11 – Reid	5 – Pack	Reed Arena (9,096); College Station, TX
January 13, 2026; 8:00 p.m., ESPN2		No. 19 Florida	L 79–96	11–6 (1–3)	24 – Brown	8 – Davis	4 – Davis	Lloyd Noble Center (5,866); Norman, OK
January 17, 2026; 12:00 p.m., SECN		No. 18 Alabama	L 81–83	11–7 (1–4)	21 – Brown	9 – Reid	4 – Brown	Lloyd Noble Center (7,922); Norman, OK
January 20, 2026; 6:00 p.m., SECN		at South Carolina	L 76–85	11–8 (1–5)	22 – Brown	7 – Tied	5 – Pack	Colonial Life Arena (10,861); Columbia, SC
January 24, 2026; 1:00 p.m., ESPN2		at Missouri; Rivalry	L 87–88 ^{OT}	11–9 (1–6)	25 – Pack	5 – Tied	6 – Brown	Mizzou Arena (10,852); Columbia, MO
January 27, 2026; 6:00 p.m., ESPN		No. 15 Arkansas	L 79–83	11–10 (1–7)	22 – Pack	12 – Wague	4 – Wague	Lloyd Noble Center (9,641); Norman, OK
January 31, 2026; 1:00 p.m., ESPN2		Texas; Rivalry	L 69–79	11–11 (1–8)	23 – Pack	5 – Tied	3 – Pack	Lloyd Noble Center (9,198); Norman, OK
February 4, 2026; 8:00 p.m., ESPN2		at Kentucky	L 78–94	11–12 (1–9)	21 – Brown	7 – Wague	4 – Tied	Rupp Arena (19,394); Lexington, KY
February 7, 2026; 2:30 p.m., SECN		at No. 15 Vanderbilt	W 92–91	12–12 (2–9)	20 – Brown	8 – Wague	4 – Pack	Memorial Gymnasium (10,892); Nashville, TN
February 14, 2026; 2:30 p.m., SECN		Georgia	W 94–78	13–12 (3–9)	19 – Davis	6 – Pack	3 – Tied	Lloyd Noble Center (7,015); Norman, OK
February 18, 2026; 6:00 p.m., ESPN2		at Tennessee	L 66–89	13–13 (3–10)	20 – Pack	6 – Reid	2 – Tied	Thompson–Boling Arena (18,361); Knoxville, TN
February 21, 2026; 7:30 p.m., SECN		Texas A&M	L 71–75	13–14 (3–11)	14 – Forsythe	13 – Wague	6 – Forsythe	Lloyd Noble Center (8,265); Norman, OK
February 24, 2026; 8:00 p.m., ESPNU		Auburn	W 91–79	14–14 (4–11)	22 – Pack	9 – Wague	4 – Brown	Lloyd Noble Center (5,922); Norman, OK
February 28, 2026; 5:00 p.m., SECN		at LSU	W 83–67	15–14 (5–11)	21 – Pack	9 – Wague	4 – Pack	Pete Maravich Assembly Center (7,019); Baton Rouge, LA
March 3, 2026; 6:00 p.m., ESPNU		Missouri; Rivalry/Senior Night	W 80–64	16–14 (6–11)	13 – Jones	8 – Jones	5 – Tied	Lloyd Noble Center (5,773); Norman, OK
March 7, 2026; 7:30 p.m., SECN		at Texas; Rivalry	W 88–85 ^{OT}	17–14 (7–11)	23 – Pack	9 – Davis	4 – Brown	Moody Center; Austin, TX
SEC Tournament
March 11, 2026; 8:30 p.m., SECN	(11)	vs. (14) South Carolina; First round	W 86–74	18–14	24 – Pack	6 – Wague	5 – Pack	Bridgestone Arena (10,701); Nashville, TN
March 12, 2026; 8:30 p.m., SECN	(11)	vs. (6) Texas A&M; Second round	W 83–63	19–14	20 – Pack	10 – Reid	4 – Davis	Bridgestone Arena (11,457); Nashville, TN
March 13, 2026; 8:30 p.m., SECN	(11)	vs. (3) No. 17 Arkansas; Quarterfinal	L 79–82	19–15	19 – Pack	7 – Brown	8 – Brown	Bridgestone Arena (15,085); Nashville, TN
College Basketball Crown
April 1, 2026*; 7:00 p.m., FS1		vs. Colorado; Quarterfinal	W 90–86 ^{OT}	20–15	20 – Pack	8 – Wague	5 – Pack	MGM Grand Garden Arena (2,276); Paradise, NV
April 4, 2026*; 12:30 p.m., FOX		vs. Baylor; Semifinal	W 82–69	21–15	21 – Brown	6 – Brown	6 – Brown	T-Mobile Arena (2,947); Paradise, NV
April 5, 2026*; 4:30 p.m., FOX		vs. West Virginia; Championship	L 82–89 ^{OT}	21–16	24 – Pack	8 – Tied	7 – Pack	T-Mobile Arena (3,109); Paradise, NV
*Non-conference game. ^{#}Rankings from AP poll. (#) Tournament seedings in parentheses. All times are in Central Time.
