= Nijel Pack =

American basketball player

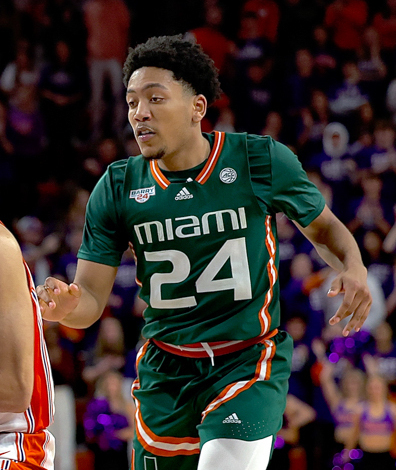

No. 9 – Antwerp Giants
- Position: Point guard
- League: BNXT League

Personal information
- Born: May 22, 2001 (age 25) Oconomowoc, Wisconsin, U.S.
- Listed height: 5 ft 10 in (1.78 m)
- Listed weight: 188 lb (85 kg)

Career information
- High school: Lawrence Central (Indianapolis, Indiana)
- College: Kansas State (2020–2022); Miami (Florida) (2022–2024); Oklahoma (2025–2026)
- NBA draft: 2026: undrafted
- Playing career: 2026–present

Career history
- 2026–present: Antwerp Giants

Career highlights
- First-team All-Big 12 (2022)

Nijel Christian Pack (born May 22, 2001) is an American professional basketball player for Antwerp Giants of the BNXT League. He played college basketball for the Kansas State Wildcats, Miami Hurricanes and Oklahoma Sooners.

== High school career ==
Pack played basketball for Lawrence Central High School in Indianapolis, Indiana. As a junior, he averaged 16.5 points and 4.1 assists, leading his team to a 22–4 record and a Class 4A sectional title. In his senior season, Pack averaged 17.7 points, 4.2 assists and four rebounds per game, and helped his team achieve a 22–3 record. He competed for the Indy Heat at the Nike Elite Youth Basketball League. He committed to playing college basketball for Kansas State over offers from Butler, Loyola (Illinois) and Nevada, among others.

== College career ==
On January 30, 2021, Pack posted a freshman season-high 26 points, five assists and three steals in a 68–61 loss to Texas A&M. He shot 8-of-14 from the three-point line, setting the program single-game record for three-pointers made by a freshman. Pack missed four games due to COVID-19 protocol and a fifth game because of an eye infection. As a freshman, Pack averaged 12.7 points, 3.8 assists and 3.7 rebounds per game. On January 22, 2022, he scored a career-high 35 points in a 78–75 loss against Kansas. He was named to the First Team All-Big 12 as a sophomore as well as Most Improved Player. Pack averaged 17.4 points, 3.8 rebounds and 2.2 assists per game. Following the season, he declared for the 2022 NBA draft and entered the transfer portal.

On April 23, 2022, Pack transferred to Miami (FL). He averaged 13.6 points, 2.7 rebounds and 2.3 assists per game as a junior. Pack declared for the 2023 NBA draft but opted to return to Miami. Pack averaged 13.3 points and 3.6 assists per game as a senior.

== Professional career ==
On July 28, 2026, he signed with Antwerp Giants of the BNXT League.

== Career statistics ==
Legend
GP	Games played	GS	Games started	MPG	Minutes per game
FG%	Field goal percentage	3P%	3-point field goal percentage	FT%	Free throw percentage
RPG	Rebounds per game	APG	Assists per game	SPG	Steals per game
BPG	Blocks per game	PPG	Points per game	**Bold**	Career high

=== College ===
Year	Team	GP	GS	MPG	FG%	3P%	FT%	RPG	APG	SPG	BPG	PPG
2020–21	Kansas State	24	24	**33.5**	.418	.405	.794	3.7	3.8	1.2	0.0	12.7
2021–22	Kansas State	29	28	33.1	.455	.436	.845	**3.8**	2.2	**1.3**	0.1	**17.4**
2022–23	Miami	35	35	31.6	.441	.404	**.882**	2.7	2.3	1.0	0.2	13.6
2023–24	Miami	25	25	32.5	.400	.357	.765	2.6	3.6	1.0	**0.3**	13.3
2024–25	Miami	9	9	31.2	.454	.386	.833	3.0	**4.3**	0.4	0.1	13.9
2025–26	Oklahoma	**37**	**37**	32.0	**.471**	**.447**	.857	3.0	3.2	0.7	**0.3**	16.8
**Career**		**159**	**158**	**32.0**	**.442**	**.415**	**.833**	**3.1**	**3.0**	**1.0**	**0.2**	**14.9**

== See also ==
- List of NCAA Division I men's basketball career 3-point scoring leaders
