= 2025–26 Arkansas Razorbacks men's basketball team =

American college basketball season

2025–26 Arkansas Razorbacks men's basketball

SEC tournament champions

NCAA tournament, Sweet Sixteen
- Conference: Southeastern Conference

Ranking
- Coaches: No. 13
- AP: No. 13
- Record: 28–9 (13–5 SEC)
- Head coach: John Calipari (2nd season)
- Associate head coach: Ronald Coleman (2nd season); Kenny Payne (2nd season)
- Assistant coaches: Chuck Martin (2nd season); Brad Calipari (2nd season)
- Home arena: Bud Walton Arena (Capacity: 19,368)

2025–26 Southeastern Conference men's basketball standings
	Conf.				Overall
Team	W		L	PCT	W		L	PCT
No. 9 Florida	16	–	2	.889	27	–	8	.771
No. 16 Alabama	13	–	5	.722	25	–	10	.714
No. 13 Arkansas †	13	–	5	.722	28	–	9	.757
No. 19 Vanderbilt	11	–	7	.611	27	–	9	.750
No. 12 Tennessee	11	–	7	.611	25	–	12	.676
Texas A&M	11	–	7	.611	22	–	12	.647
Georgia	10	–	8	.556	22	–	11	.667
Missouri	10	–	8	.556	20	–	13	.606
Kentucky	10	–	8	.556	22	–	14	.611
No. 22 Texas	9	–	9	.500	21	–	15	.583
Oklahoma	7	–	11	.389	21	–	16	.568
Auburn	7	–	11	.389	22	–	16	.579
Mississippi State	5	–	13	.278	13	–	19	.406
South Carolina	4	–	14	.222	13	–	19	.406
Ole Miss	4	–	14	.222	15	–	20	.429
LSU	3	–	15	.167	15	–	17	.469
† 2026 SEC tournament winner Rankings from AP poll

The 2025–26 Arkansas Razorbacks men's basketball team represented the University of Arkansas during the 2025–26 NCAA Division I men's basketball season. The Razorbacks, led by second-year head coach John Calipari, played their home games at Bud Walton Arena in Fayetteville, Arkansas as a member of the Southeastern Conference. Arkansas finished their season with a record of 28-9 and ranked #15. The Razorbacks won the SEC Tournament championship for only the second time (their first since 2000), and made it to the NCAA Tournament Sweet 16 round. Freshman guard Darius Acuff earned SEC Freshman of the Year and SEC Player of the Year honors, and was named 1st team All-American, the first since Sidney Moncrief earned 1st team honors in 1979.

== Previous season ==
Arkansas finished the season 22–14, 8–10 in SEC play to finish in a tie for 9th place. As the No. 9 seed in the SEC tournament, they defeated South Carolina before losing to Ole Miss in the second round. They made it to the 2025 NCAA Division I men's basketball tournament as the No. 10 seed in the West regional. They beat Kansas and St. Johns in the first and second round respectively, before falling to former Southwest Conference-foe Texas Tech in the Sweet Sixteen in overtime.

== Offseason ==
=== Departures ===
Name	Number	Pos.	Height	Weight	Year	Hometown	Reason for departure
Adou Thiero	3	F	6'8"	220	Junior	Pittsburgh, PA	Declared for 2025 NBA draft, drafted 36th overall by the Brooklyn Nets, traded to the Los Angeles Lakers
Casmir Chavis	5	G	6'0"	180	Freshman	Minneapolis, MN	Transferred to UT Arlington
Boogie Fland	2	G	6'2"	175	Freshman	Bronx, NY	Transferred to Florida
Zvonimir Ivišić	44	F	7'2"	245	Sophomore	Vodice, Croatia	Transferred to Illinois
Melo Sanchez	8	G	6'4"	185	Junior	San Diego, CA	Transferred to Central Connecticut
Jonas Aidoo	9	F	6'11"	240	Graduate student	Durham, NC	Graduated
Johnell Davis	1	G	6'4"	210	Graduate student	Gary, IN	Graduated
Kareem Watkins	25	G	5'8"	175	Graduate student	Camden, NJ	Graduated

=== Incoming transfers ===
Name	Number	Pos.	Height	Weight	Year	Hometown	Previous school
Malique Ewin	12	F	6'10"	240	Senior	Lawrenceville, GA	Florida State
Nick Pringle	23	F	6'10"	230	Graduate student	Seabrook, SC	South Carolina

==== 2025 recruiting class ====
Arkansas signed three high school players to its 2025 class, including two McDonald's All-Americans (Acuff, Thomas) and the top player in the state of Arkansas (Sealy). Arkansas also signed a top international player (Rtail) who has played professionally in Europe. This class is ranked the #4 class in the country according to On3.com, ESPN, and 247Sports, and the #5 class by Rivals.

College recruiting
Name	Hometown	School	Height	Weight	Commit date
Darius Acuff Jr. PG	Detroit, MI	IMG Academy	6 ft 2 in (1.88 m)	175 lb (79 kg)	Jul 26, 2024
Darius Acuff Jr. PG	Recruit ratings: Rivals: 247Sports: On3: ESPN: (95)				
Meleek Thomas; CG	Pittsburgh, PA	Overtime Elite	6 ft 4 in (1.93 m)	175 lb (79 kg)	Nov 12, 2024
Meleek Thomas; CG	Recruit ratings: Rivals: 247Sports: On3: ESPN: (94)				
Paulo Semedo; C	Luanda, Angola	West Oaks Academy	7 ft 1 in (2.16 m)	225 lb (102 kg)	Jun 13, 2025
Paulo Semedo; C	Recruit ratings: Rivals: 247Sports: On3: ESPN: (85)				
Isaiah Sealy; SF	Springdale, AR	Springdale	6 ft 7 in (2.01 m)	195 lb (88 kg)	Apr 1, 2024
Isaiah Sealy; SF	Recruit ratings: Rivals: 247Sports: On3: ESPN: (83)				
Karim Rtail; SF	Beirut, Lebanon		6 ft 9 in (2.06 m)	210 lb (95 kg)	Mar 19, 2025
Karim Rtail; SF	Recruit ratings: No ratings found				
Amere Brown; PG	Pittsburgh, PA	Woodland Hills	5 ft 9 in (1.75 m)	180 lb (82 kg)	May 28, 2025
Amere Brown; PG	Recruit ratings: No ratings found				
Elmir Džafić; C	Tuzla, Bosnia and Herzegovina		7 ft 0 in (2.13 m)	285 lb (129 kg)	Jun 12, 2025
Elmir Džafić; C	Recruit ratings: No ratings found				
Overall recruit ranking: Rivals: 5 247Sports: 4 On3: 4 ESPN: 4
Note: In many cases, Scout, Rivals, 247Sports, On3, and ESPN may conflict in their listings of height and weight.; In these cases, the average was taken. ESPN grades are on a 100-point scale.; Sources: "Arkansas 2025 Basketball Commitments". Rivals.; "2025 Team Ranking". Rivals.

==== 2026 recruiting class ====
As of May 20, 2026, Arkansas has signed all four players to their 2026 recruiting class. Shooting guard/small forward JJ Andrews, the son of former NFL offensive lineman Shawn Andrews, is the #1 player in Arkansas and a 5 star recruit. He was named a McDonald's All-American. Arkansas also signed small forward Abdou Toure, a high 4 star recruit and Top 50 player nationally, and the #1 player in Connecticut. 7'0" power forward Miikka Muurinen, a 5 star player, signed with Arkansas on May 19, and 5 star combo guard Jordan Smith Jr, also a McDonald's All-American, signed on May 20. Arkansas has the #1 class on 247Sports, the #2 class on Rivals/On3 (just behind Duke), and #1 on ESPN.

College recruiting
Name	Hometown	School	Height	Weight	Commit date
Jordan Smith Jr. SG	Washington, DC	Paul VI Catholic (VA)	6 ft 3 in (1.91 m)	195 lb (88 kg)	Feb 13, 2026
Jordan Smith Jr. SG	Recruit ratings: Rivals: 247Sports: ESPN: (98)				
Miikka Muurinen; PF	Serbia	Partizan Belgrade	7 ft 0 in (2.13 m)	220 lb (100 kg)	Apr 27, 2026
Miikka Muurinen; PF	Recruit ratings: Rivals: 247Sports: ESPN: (95)				
JJ Andrews; SF	Little Rock, AR	Little Rock Christian	6 ft 7 in (2.01 m)	220 lb (100 kg)	May 5, 2025
JJ Andrews; SF	Recruit ratings: Rivals: 247Sports: On3: ESPN: (93)				
Abdou Toure; SF	West Haven, CT	Notre Dame High	6 ft 6 in (1.98 m)	200 lb (91 kg)	Oct 3, 2025
Abdou Toure; SF	Recruit ratings: Rivals: 247Sports: On3: ESPN: (88)				
Overall recruit ranking: Rivals: 2 247Sports: 2 On3: 1 ESPN: 1
Note: In many cases, Scout, Rivals, 247Sports, On3, and ESPN may conflict in their listings of height and weight.; In these cases, the average was taken. ESPN grades are on a 100-point scale.; Sources: "Arkansas 2026 Basketball Commitments". Rivals.; "2026 Team Ranking". Rivals.

== Roster ==
2025–26 Arkansas Razorbacks men's basketball team
Players
Coaches

Pos.	#	Name	Height	Weight	Year	Previous school	Hometown
G	0	Jaden Karuletwa	6 ft 4 in (1.93 m)	195 lb (88 kg)	So	Village Christian School	Sun Valley, California
G	1	Meleek Thomas	6 ft 5 in (1.96 m)	185 lb (84 kg)	Fr	Overtime Elite	Pittsburgh, Pennsylvania
G	2	Amere Brown	5 ft 9 in (1.75 m)	180 lb (82 kg)	Fr	Woodland Hills High School	Pittsburgh, Pennsylvania
G	5	Darius Acuff Jr.	6 ft 3 in (1.91 m)	190 lb (86 kg)	Fr	IMG Academy	Detroit, Michigan
F	7	Trevon Brazile	6 ft 10 in (2.08 m)	230 lb (104 kg)	Sr	Missouri	Springfield, Missouri
F	11	Karter Knox	6 ft 6 in (1.98 m)	220 lb (100 kg)	So	Overtime Elite	Tampa, Florida
F	12	Malique Ewin	6 ft 10 in (2.08 m)	240 lb (109 kg)	Sr	Florida State	Lawrenceville, Georgia
G	14	Ayden Kelley	5 ft 10 in (1.78 m)	170 lb (77 kg)	So	Northpoint Christian School	Memphis, Tennessee
C	15	Elmir Džafić	7 ft 0 in (2.13 m)	285 lb (129 kg)	Fr	n/a	Tuzla, Bosnia and Herzegovina
G	21	D. J. Wagner	6 ft 4 in (1.93 m)	190 lb (86 kg)	Jr	Kentucky	Camden, New Jersey
F	23	Nick Pringle	6 ft 10 in (2.08 m)	230 lb (104 kg)	GS	South Carolina	Seabrook, South Carolina
F	24	Billy Richmond III	6 ft 6 in (1.98 m)	205 lb (93 kg)	So	Camden High School	Memphis, Tennessee
F	30	Isaiah Sealy	6 ft 7 in (2.01 m)	195 lb (88 kg)	Fr	Springdale High School	Springdale, Arkansas
F	35	Karim Rtail	6 ft 7 in (2.01 m)	205 lb (93 kg)	Fr	Neptūnas-Akvaservis	Beirut, Lebanon
C	99	Paulo Semedo	7 ft 1 in (2.16 m)	225 lb (102 kg)	Fr	West Oaks Academy	Luanda, Angola

Head coach

- John Calipari (Clarion)

Assistant coach(es)

- Kenny Payne (Louisville)
- Ronald Coleman (Lamar)
- Chuck Martin (Monmouth)
- Brad Calipari (Kentucky)

Legend

- (C) Team captain
- (S) Suspended
- (I) Ineligible
- (W) Walk-on
- Injured
- Current redshirt

Roster
Last update: October 25, 2025

== Schedule and results ==
Date time, TV	Rank^{#}	Opponent^{#}	Result	Record	High points	High rebounds	High assists	Site (attendance) city, state
Exhibition
October 24, 2025*; 7:00 pm, SECN+	No. 14	Cincinnati	W 89–61	–	18 – Thomas	7 – Thomas	4 – Acuff Jr.	Bud Walton Arena (14,832); Fayetteville, AR
October 27, 2025*; 8:00 pm, ESPNU	No. 14	at Memphis	W 99–75	–	23 – Thomas	7 – Tied	7 – Acuff Jr.	FedEx Forum (9,573); Memphis, TN
Non-conference regular season
November 3, 2025*; 6:00 pm, SECN	No. 14	Southern	W 109–77	1–0	25 – Brazile	11 – Brazile	7 – Tied	Bud Walton Arena (19,200); Fayetteville, AR
November 8, 2025*; 6:00 pm, FOX	No. 14	at No. 22 Michigan State	L 66–69	1–1	16 – Tied	7 – Pringle	6 – Acuff Jr.	Breslin Center (14,797); East Lansing, MI
November 11, 2025*; 7:00 pm, SECN+	No. 21	Central Arkansas	W 93–56	2–1	21 – Acuff Jr.	10 – Knox	6 – Thomas	Bud Walton Arena (19,200); Fayetteville, AR
November 14, 2025*; 7:00 pm, SECN+	No. 21	Samford	W 79–75	3–1	20 – Acuff Jr.	8 – Thomas	5 – Acuff Jr.	Bud Walton Arena (19,200); Fayetteville, AR
November 18, 2025*; 7:00 pm, SECN+	No. 21	Winthrop	W 84–83	4–1	26 – Thomas	8 – Brazile	5 – Acuff Jr.	Bud Walton Arena (19,200); Fayetteville, AR
November 21, 2025*; 7:00 pm, SECN+	No. 21	Jackson State	W 115–61	5–1	21 – Ewin	10 – Knox	7 – Wagner	Bud Walton Arena (19,200); Fayetteville, AR
November 27, 2025*; 7:00 pm, CBS	No. 22	vs. No. 4 Duke; CBS Sports Thanksgiving Classic	L 71–80	5–2	21 – Acuff Jr.	11 – Brazile	5 – Acuff Jr.	United Center (10,766); Chicago, IL
December 3, 2025*; 6:00 pm, ESPN	No. 25	No. 6 Louisville; ACC–SEC Challenge	W 89–80	6–2	21 – Brazile	9 – Ewin	10 – Acuff Jr.	Bud Walton Arena (19,200); Fayetteville, AR
December 6, 2025*; 3:00 pm, SECN+	No. 25	vs. Fresno State	W 82–58	7–2	18 – Acuff Jr.	7 – Pringle	8 – Acuff Jr.	Simmons Bank Arena (11,534); North Little Rock, AR
December 13, 2025*; 11:00 am, ESPN2	No. 17	vs. No. 16 Texas Tech; Revocruit Rematch	W 93–86	8–2	24 – Brazile	10 – Brazile	8 – Acuff Jr.	American Airlines Center (8,277); Dallas, TX
December 16, 2025*; 8:00 pm, SECN	No. 14	Queens	W 108–80	9–2	26 – Brazile	7 – Pringle	10 – Acuff Jr.	Bud Walton Arena (19,200); Fayetteville, AR
December 20, 2025*; 4:30 pm, CBS	No. 14	vs. No. 8 Houston; Never Forget Tribute Classic	L 85–94	9–3	27 – Acuff Jr.	9 – Ewin	7 – Acuff Jr.	Prudential Center (6,246); Newark, NJ
December 29, 2025*; 7:00 pm, SECN+	No. 18	James Madison	W 103–74	10–3	28 – Thomas	9 – Ewin	6 – Tied	Bud Walton Arena (19,200); Fayetteville, AR
SEC regular season
January 3, 2026; 2:00 pm, ESPN2	No. 18	No. 19 Tennessee	W 86–75	11–3 (1–0)	29 – Acuff Jr.	7 – Tied	4 – Acuff Jr.	Bud Walton Arena (19,200); Fayetteville, AR
January 7, 2026; 8:00 pm, SECN	No. 15	at Ole Miss	W 94–87	12–3 (2–0)	26 – Acuff Jr.	6 – Tied	9 – Acuff Jr.	SJB Pavilion (8,012); Oxford, MS
January 10, 2026; 5:00 pm, ESPN	No. 15	at Auburn	L 73–95	12–4 (2–1)	19 – Acuff Jr.	12 – Ewin	4 – Thomas	Neville Arena (9,121); Auburn, AL
January 14, 2026; 8:00 pm, SECN	No. 17	South Carolina	W 108–74	13–4 (3–1)	21 – Thomas	7 – Pringle	13 – Acuff Jr.	Bud Walton Arena (19,200); Fayetteville, AR
January 17, 2026; 3:00 pm, ESPN2	No. 17	at No. 21 Georgia	L 76–90	13–5 (3–2)	20 – Acuff Jr.	8 – Richmond III	6 – Acuff Jr.	Stegeman Coliseum (10,523); Athens, GA
January 20, 2026; 8:00 pm, ESPN	No. 20	No. 15 Vanderbilt	W 93–68	14–5 (4–2)	17 – Acuff Jr.	14 – Brazile	5 – Tied	Bud Walton Arena (19,200); Fayetteville, AR
January 24, 2026; 4:00 pm, SECN	No. 20	LSU	W 85–81	15–5 (5–2)	31 – Acuff Jr.	7 – Brazile	6 – Acuff Jr.	Bud Walton Arena (19,200); Fayetteville, AR
January 27, 2026; 6:00 pm, ESPN	No. 15	at Oklahoma	W 83–79	16–5 (6–2)	21 – Acuff Jr.	7 – Brazile	9 – Acuff Jr.	Lloyd Noble Center (9,641); Norman, OK
January 31, 2026; 5:30 pm, ESPN	No. 15	Kentucky	L 77–85	16–6 (6–3)	22 – Acuff Jr.	8 – Brazile	3 – Acuff Jr.	Bud Walton Arena (19,200); Fayetteville, AR
February 7, 2026; 11:00 am, ESPN2	No. 21	at Mississippi State	W 88–68	17–6 (7–3)	24 – Acuff Jr.	11 – Pringle	8 – Acuff Jr.	Humphrey Coliseum (8,254); Starkville, MS
February 10, 2026; 8:00 pm, SECN	No. 21	at LSU	W 91–62	18–6 (8–3)	28 – Acuff Jr.	12 – Brazile	5 – Acuff Jr.	Pete Maravich Assembly Center (6,701); Baton Rouge, LA
February 14, 2026; 7:30 pm, ESPN	No. 21	Auburn	W 88–75	19–6 (9–3)	31 – Acuff Jr.	10 – Thomas	7 – Acuff Jr.	Bud Walton Arena (19,200); Fayetteville, AR
February 18, 2026; 6:00 pm, ESPN	No. 20	at No. 25 Alabama	L 115–117 ^{2OT}	19–7 (9–4)	49 – Acuff Jr.	8 – Brazile	5 – Tied	Coleman Coliseum (13,474); Tuscaloosa, AL
February 21, 2026; 3:00 pm, ESPN	No. 20	Missouri	W 94–86	20–7 (10–4)	21 – Richmond III	8 – Tied	6 – Brazile	Bud Walton Arena (19,200); Fayetteville, AR
February 25, 2026; 8:00 pm, ESPN2	No. 20	Texas A&M	W 99–84	21–7 (11–4)	23 – Richmond III	9 – Ewin	7 – Acuff Jr.	Bud Walton Arena (19,200); Fayetteville, AR
February 28, 2026; 7:30 pm, ESPN	No. 20	at No. 7 Florida; College GameDay	L 77–111	21–8 (11–5)	22 – Richmond III	8 – Ewin	6 – Acuff Jr.	O'Connell Center (11,076); Gainesville, FL
March 4, 2026; 6:00 pm, ESPN2	No. 20	Texas	W 105–85	22–8 (12–5)	28 – Tied	9 – Richmond III	13 – Acuff Jr.	Bud Walton Arena (19,200); Fayetteville, AR
March 7, 2026; 11:00 am, ESPN	No. 20	at Missouri	W 88–84 ^{OT}	23–8 (13–5)	28 – Thomas	9 – Tied	5 – Wagner	Mizzou Arena (15,061); Columbia, MO
SEC tournament
March 13, 2026; 8:30 p.m., SECN	(3) No. 17	vs. (11) Oklahoma; Quarterfinal	W 82–79	24–8	37 – Acuff Jr.	11 – Brazile	5 – Acuff Jr.	Bridgestone Arena (15,085); Nashville, TN
March 14, 2026; 2:30 p.m., ESPN	(3) No. 17	vs. (15) Ole Miss; Semifinal	W 93–90 ^{OT}	25–8	29 – Thomas	13 – Ewin	7 – Acuff Jr.	Bridgestone Arena (16,612); Nashville, TN
March 15, 2026; 12:00 p.m., ESPN	(3) No. 17	vs. (4) No. 22 Vanderbilt; Championship	W 86–75	26–8	30 – Acuff Jr.	9 – Brazile	11 – Acuff Jr.	Bridgestone Arena (18,377); Nashville, TN
NCAA tournament
March 19, 2026; 3:25 p.m., TBS	(4 W) No. 14	vs. (13 W) Hawaii; First round	W 97–78	27–8	24 – Acuff Jr.	12 – Ewin	7 – Acuff Jr.	Moda Center (12,104); Portland, OR
March 21, 2026; 8:45 p.m., TBS	(4 W) No. 14	vs. (12 W) High Point; Second round	W 94–88	28–8	36 – Acuff Jr.	12 – Ewin	6 – Acuff Jr.	Moda Center (14,385); Portland, OR
March 26, 2026; 8:45 p.m., CBS	(4 W) No. 14	vs. (1 W) No. 2 Arizona; Sweet Sixteen	L 88–109	28–9	28 – Acuff Jr.	6 – Brazile	3 – Tied	SAP Center (15,341); San Jose, CA
*Non-conference game. ^{#}Rankings from AP poll. (#) Tournament seedings in parentheses. W=West. All times are in Central Time.

== Rankings ==
Ranking movements Legend: ██ Increase in ranking ██ Decrease in ranking
	Week																				
Poll	Pre	1	2	3	4	5	6	7	8	9	10	11	12	13	14	15	16	17	18	19	Final
AP	14	21	21	22	25	17	14	18	18	15	17	20	15	21	21	20	20	20	17	14	13
Coaches	15	21	22	21	23	17	14	18	18	15	17	20	16	21	21	17	17	19	17	15	13
