= 2025–26 Tennessee Volunteers basketball team =

American collegiate basketball team

2025–26 Tennessee Volunteers basketball

NCAA tournament, Elite Eight
- Conference: Southeastern Conference

Ranking
- Coaches: No. 12
- AP: No. 12
- Record: 25–12 (11–7 SEC)
- Head coach: Rick Barnes (11th season)
- Associate head coach: Justin Gainey
- Assistant coaches: Gregg Polinsky; Amorrow Morgan; Bryan Lentz; Steve McClain
- Home arena: Thompson–Boling Arena

2025–26 Southeastern Conference men's basketball standings
	Conf.				Overall
Team	W		L	PCT	W		L	PCT
No. 9 Florida	16	–	2	.889	27	–	8	.771
No. 16 Alabama	13	–	5	.722	25	–	10	.714
No. 13 Arkansas †	13	–	5	.722	28	–	9	.757
No. 19 Vanderbilt	11	–	7	.611	27	–	9	.750
No. 12 Tennessee	11	–	7	.611	25	–	12	.676
Texas A&M	11	–	7	.611	22	–	12	.647
Georgia	10	–	8	.556	22	–	11	.667
Missouri	10	–	8	.556	20	–	13	.606
Kentucky	10	–	8	.556	22	–	14	.611
No. 22 Texas	9	–	9	.500	21	–	15	.583
Oklahoma	7	–	11	.389	21	–	16	.568
Auburn	7	–	11	.389	22	–	16	.579
Mississippi State	5	–	13	.278	13	–	19	.406
South Carolina	4	–	14	.222	13	–	19	.406
Ole Miss	4	–	14	.222	15	–	20	.429
LSU	3	–	15	.167	15	–	17	.469
† 2026 SEC tournament winner Rankings from AP poll

The 2025–26 Tennessee Volunteers basketball team represented the University of Tennessee during the 2025–26 NCAA Division I men's basketball season. The team was led by eleventh-year head coach Rick Barnes and played their home games at Thompson–Boling Arena located in Knoxville, Tennessee, as a member of the Southeastern Conference (SEC).

This was the third consecutive season that Tennessee made it to the Elite Eight. Prior to the 2024 season, they had only made it one other time.

== Previous season ==
The Volunteers finished the 2024–25 season 30–8, 12–6 in SEC play to finish in fourth place. As the No. 4 seed in the SEC men's basketball tournament, held at Bridgestone Arena in Nashville, Tennessee, they received a double bye to the quarterfinals. There, they defeated Texas, 83–72, to advance to the semifinals, where they secured a 70–65 win over eventual Final Four semifinalist Auburn. In the championship game, they lost to the eventual NCAA champion Florida, 86–77.

Tennessee received a bid to the 2025 NCAA tournament as the No. 2 seed in the Midwest region. There, they defeated Wofford, 77–62, in the first round, UCLA, 67–58, in the second round, and SEC rival Kentucky, 78–65, in the Sweet Sixteen to advance to the Elite Eight for the second consecutive year. Just like in 2024, Tennessee's season once again ended in the Elite Eight with a loss to the eventual runner-up — this time to Houston, 69–50, denying them their first-ever Final Four appearance.

== Offseason ==
=== Departures ===
Departures
Name	Number	Pos.	Height	Weight	Year	Hometown	Reason for departure
Chaz Lanier	2	G	6'5"	207	Graduate Student	Nashville, TN	Graduated/2025 NBA draft; selected 56th overall by Detroit Pistons
Zakai Zeigler	5	G	5'9"	172	Senior	Long Island, NY	Graduated, signed with Nanterre 92
Igor Miličić Jr.	7	F	6'10"	225	Senior	Rovinj, Croatia	Graduated/undrafted in 2025 NBA draft; signed with the Philadelphia 76ers
Darlinstone Dubar	8	G	6'6"	220	Graduate Student	Charlotte, NC	Transferred
Jordan Gainey	11	G	6'4"	190	Senior	Tucson, AZ	Graduated
Jahmai Mashack	15	G	6'4"	202	Senior	Fontana, CA	Graduated/2025 NBA draft; selected 59th overall by Memphis Grizzlies
Ben Linnemeyer	35	G	6'6"	205	Freshman	Columbia, MO	Walk-on; transferred to Harding
Cameron Carr	43	G	6'6"	189	Sophomore	Eden Prairie, MN	Transferred to Baylor

Zakai Zeigler initially pursued a federal judiciary appeal for an exemption to the NCAA's new eligibility rules in an attempt to play a fifth season of Division I basketball in a five-year span, but withdrew the appeal on July 1, 2025.

=== Incoming transfers ===
Incoming transfers
Name	Number	Pos.	Height	Weight	Year	Hometown	Previous school
Ja'Kobi Gillespie	0	G	6'1"	188	Senior	Greeneville, TN	Maryland
Jaylen Carey	23	F	6'8"	267	Junior	Southwest Ranches, FL	Vanderbilt
Amaree Abram	77	G	6'3"	200	Senior	Port Arthur, TX	Louisiana Tech

=== Recruiting class ===
College recruiting
Name	Hometown	School	Height	Weight	Commit date
Nate Ament #2 SF	Manassas, VA	Highland School	6 ft 9 in (2.06 m)	185 lb (84 kg)	Apr 20, 2025
Nate Ament #2 SF	Recruit ratings: Rivals: 247Sports: ESPN: (97)				
DeWayne Brown #25 C	Birmingham, AL	Hoover High School	6 ft 8 in (2.03 m)	265 lb (120 kg)	Apr 20, 2024
DeWayne Brown #25 C	Recruit ratings: Rivals: 247Sports: ESPN: (83)				
Amari Evans #26 SF	Atlanta, GA	Overtime Elite	6 ft 4 in (1.93 m)	200 lb (91 kg)	Nov 1, 2024
Amari Evans #26 SF	Recruit ratings: Rivals: 247Sports: ESPN: (83)				
Clarence Massamba; CG	Monaco	AS Monaco Basket Club	6 ft 5 in (1.96 m)	185 lb (84 kg)	Apr 30, 2025
Clarence Massamba; CG	Recruit ratings: Rivals: 247Sports: ESPN: (NR)				
Troy Henderson; PG	Richmond, VA	John Marshall High School	6 ft 1 in (1.85 m)	180 lb (82 kg)	Mar 25, 2025
Troy Henderson; PG	Recruit ratings: Rivals: 247Sports: ESPN: (NR)				
Overall recruit ranking:
Note: In many cases, Scout, Rivals, 247Sports, On3, and ESPN may conflict in their listings of height and weight.; In these cases, the average was taken. ESPN grades are on a 100-point scale.; Sources: "2025 Team Ranking". Rivals.

== Roster ==
2025–26 Tennessee Volunteers men's basketball team
Players
Coaches

Pos.	#	Name	Height	Weight	Year	Previous school	Hometown
G	0	Ja'Kobi Gillespie	6 ft 1 in (1.85 m)	188 lb (85 kg)	Sr	Maryland	Greeneville, Tennessee
G	1	Amari Evans	6 ft 5 in (1.96 m)	220 lb (100 kg)	Fr	Overtime Elite	Pittsburgh, Pennsylvania
G	3	Bishop Boswell	6 ft 4 in (1.93 m)	204 lb (93 kg)	So	Myers Park High School	Charlotte, North Carolina
G	4	Clarence Massamba	6 ft 5 in (1.96 m)	192 lb (87 kg)	Fr	Edmentum	Paris, France
F	6	DeWayne Brown II	6 ft 8 in (2.03 m)	251 lb (114 kg)	Fr	Hoover High School	Hoover, Alabama
G	7	Grant Hurst	6 ft 2 in (1.88 m)	205 lb (93 kg)	RS Sr	UT Martin	Cleveland, Tennessee
F	10	Nate Ament	6 ft 10 in (2.08 m)	207 lb (94 kg)	Fr	Highland School	Manassas, Virginia
G	11	Gavin Paull (W)	5 ft 11 in (1.8 m)	160 lb (73 kg)	So	Westlake High School	Austin, Texas
F	12	Cade Phillips	6 ft 9 in (2.06 m)	221 lb (100 kg)	Jr	Link Academy	Jacksonville, Alabama
F	13	J. P. Estrella	6 ft 11 in (2.11 m)	240 lb (109 kg)	RS So	Brewster Academy	Scarborough, Maine
G	21	Campbell Duncan (W)	6 ft 6 in (1.98 m)	205 lb (93 kg)	So	Anderson High School	Austin, Texas
F	23	Jaylen Carey	6 ft 8 in (2.03 m)	267 lb (121 kg)	Jr	Vanderbilt	Southwest Ranches, Florida
G	24	Troy Henderson	6 ft 1 in (1.85 m)	186 lb (84 kg)	Fr	John Marshall High School	Richmond, Virginia
F	34	Felix Okpara	6 ft 11 in (2.11 m)	243 lb (110 kg)	Sr	Ohio State	Lagos, Nigeria
G	35	Ethan Burg	6 ft 3 in (1.91 m)	199 lb (90 kg)	So	Gymnasia Realit Rishon LeZion	Mishmar HaShiv'a, Israel
G	77	Amaree Abram	6 ft 3 in (1.91 m)	200 lb (91 kg)	Sr	Louisiana Tech	Port Arthur, Texas

Head coach

- Rick Barnes (Lenoir–Rhyne)

Assistant coach(es)

- Justin Gainey (NC State)
- Rod Clark (Lindsey Wilson)
- Amorrow Morgan (Idaho State)
- Bryan Lentz (Lenoir–Rhyne)
- Steve McClain (Chadron State)

Legend

- (C) Team captain
- (S) Suspended
- (I) Ineligible
- (W) Walk-on
- Injured
- Current redshirt

Roster

== Schedule and results ==
Date time, TV	Rank^{#}	Opponent^{#}	Result	Record	High points	High rebounds	High assists	Site (attendance) city, state
Exhibition
October 26, 2025*; 7:00 p.m., ESPN2	No. 18	No. 6 Duke	L 76–83		19 – Gillespie	10 – Ament	8 – Gillespie	Thompson–Boling Arena (21,678); Knoxville, TN
Non-conference regular season
November 3, 2025*; 7:00 p.m., SECN+/ESPN+	No. 18	Mercer	W 76–61	1–0	18 – Ament	10 – Carey	6 – Gillespie	Thompson–Boling Arena (18,559); Knoxville, TN
November 8, 2025*; 3:00 p.m., SECN+/ESPN+	No. 18	Northern Kentucky	W 95–56	2–0	23 – Ament	11 – Tied	5 – Tied	Thompson–Boling Arena (18,661); Knoxville, TN
November 12, 2025*; 7:00 p.m., SECN+/ESPN+	No. 20	North Florida	W 99–66	3−0	23 – Estrella	10 – Estrella	7 – Gillespie	Thompson–Boling Arena (17,614); Knoxville, TN
November 17, 2025*; 8:30 p.m., SECN	No. 20	Rice	W 91–66	4–0	20 – Okpara	10 – Ament	8 – Gillespie	Thompson–Boling Arena (17,283); Knoxville, TN
November 20, 2025*; 7:00 p.m., SECN+/ESPN+	No. 20	Tennessee State	W 89–60	5–0	17 – Gillespie	8 – Okpara	5 – Gillespie	Thompson–Boling Arena (17,313); Knoxville, TN
November 24, 2025*; 1:00 p.m., TNT	No. 17	vs. Rutgers; Players Era Festival Game 1	W 85–60	6–0	32 – Gillespie	7 – Tied	4 – Gillespie	MGM Grand Garden Arena (4,628); Paradise, NV
November 25, 2025*; 6:00 p.m., TNT	No. 17	vs. No. 3 Houston; Players Era Festival Game 2	W 76–73	7–0	22 – Gillespie	7 – Carey	4 – Tied	MGM Grand Garden Arena; Paradise, NV
November 26, 2025*; 7:00 p.m., TNT	No. 17	vs. Kansas; Players Era Festival 3rd place game	L 76–81	7–1	20 – Ament	10 – Carey	4 – Tied	MGM Grand Garden Arena; Paradise, NV
December 2, 2025*; 7:00 p.m., ESPN2	No. 13	at Syracuse; ACC–SEC Challenge	L 60–62	7–2	22 – Carey	9 – Carey	7 – Gillespie	JMA Wireless Dome (19,657); Syracuse, NY
December 6, 2025*; 8:00 p.m., ESPN	No. 13	vs. No. 14 Illinois; Music City Madness	L 62–75	7–3	15 – Gillespie	7 – Tied	5 – Gillespie	Bridgestone Arena (16,157); Nashville, TN
December 16, 2025*; 7:00 p.m., ESPN	No. 20	No. 11 Louisville	W 83–62	8–3	23 – Gillespie	10 – Carey	5 – Gillespie	Thompson–Boling Arena (21,678); Knoxville, TN
December 21, 2025*; 3:00 p.m., SECN+/ESPN+	No. 20	Gardner–Webb	W 94–52	9–3	15 – Tied	14 – Brown II	9 – Gillespie	Thompson–Boling Arena (19,059); Knoxville, TN
December 30, 2025*; 8:00 p.m., SECN	No. 19	South Carolina State	W 105–54	10–3	21 – Gillespie	10 – Tied	8 – Gillespie	Thompson–Boling Arena (18,279); Knoxville, TN
SEC regular season
January 3, 2026; 3:00 p.m., ESPN2	No. 19	at No. 18 Arkansas	L 75–86	10–4 (0–1)	16 – Evans	7 – Okpara	4 – Gillespie	Bud Walton Arena (19,200); Fayetteville, AR
January 6, 2026; 9:00 p.m., ESPN2	No. 21	Texas	W 85–71	11–4 (1–1)	34 – Gillespie	6 – Estrella	5 – Gillespie	Thompson–Boling Arena (17,402); Knoxville, TN
January 10, 2026; 12:00 p.m., ESPN	No. 21	at Florida	L 67–91	11–5 (1–2)	17 – Ament	5 – Tied	3 – Gillespie	O'Connell Center (10,182); Gainesville, FL
January 13, 2026; 7:00 p.m., SECN	No. 24	Texas A&M	W 87–82 ^{2OT}	12–5 (2–2)	23 – Ament	12 – Okpara	5 – Gillespie	Thompson–Boling Arena (17,808); Knoxville, TN
January 17, 2026; 12:00 p.m., ESPN	No. 24	Kentucky; Rivalry	L 78–80	12–6 (2–3)	24 – Gillespie	7 – Carey	8 – Gillespie	Thompson–Boling Arena (21,678); Knoxville, TN
January 24, 2026; 8:30 p.m., ESPN		at No. 17 Alabama	W 79–73	13–6 (3–3)	29 – Ament	8 – Okpara	4 – Gillespie	Coleman Coliseum (13,474); Tuscaloosa, AL
January 27, 2026; 7:00 p.m., SECN		at Georgia	W 86–85 ^{OT}	14–6 (4–3)	21 – Gillespie	11 – Okpara	6 – Gillespie	Stegeman Coliseum (9,854); Athens, GA
January 31, 2026; 8:30 p.m., ESPN		Auburn	W 77–69	15–6 (5–3)	22 – Ament	8 – Tied	5 – Gillespie	Thompson–Boling Arena (21,678); Knoxville, TN
February 3, 2026; 7:00 p.m., ESPN2	No. 25	Ole Miss	W 84–66	16–6 (6–3)	28 – Ament	9 – Estrella	5 – Boswell	Thompson–Boling Arena (18,882); Knoxville, TN
February 7, 2026; 8:30 p.m., ESPN	No. 25	at Kentucky; Rivalry	L 71–74	16–7 (6–4)	29 – Ament	12 – Brown II	4 – Gillespie	Rupp Arena (20,123); Lexington, KY
February 11, 2026; 9:00 p.m., ESPN2		at Mississippi State	W 73–64	17–7 (7–4)	18 – Gillespie	8 – Brown II	8 – Boswell	Humphrey Coliseum (7,986); Starkville, MS
February 14, 2026; 6:00 p.m., SECN		LSU	W 73–63	18–7 (8–4)	22 – Ament	9 – Tied	6 – Gillespie	Thompson–Boling Arena (21,678); Knoxville, TN
February 18, 2026; 7:00 p.m., ESPN2		Oklahoma	W 89–66	19–7 (9–4)	29 – Ament	7 – Tied	8 – Gillespie	Thompson–Boling Arena (18,361); Knoxville, TN
February 21, 2026; 2:00 p.m., ESPN		at No. 19 Vanderbilt; Rivalry	W 69–65	20–7 (10–4)	17 – Gillespie	9 – Ament	4 – Boswell	Memorial Gymnasium (14,316); Nashville, TN
February 24, 2026; 9:00 p.m., SECN	No. 22	at Missouri	L 69–73	20–8 (10–5)	19 – Gillespie	10 – Carey	6 – Gillespie	Mizzou Arena (11,094); Columbia, MO
February 28, 2026; 6:00 p.m., ESPN	No. 22	No. 17 Alabama	L 69–71	20–9 (10–6)	26 – Gillespie	9 – Tied	7 – Gillespie	Thompson–Boling Arena (21,678); Knoxville, TN
March 3, 2026; 6:00 p.m., SECN	No. 23	at South Carolina	W 78–59	21–9 (11–6)	22 – Estrella	8 – Okpara	12 – Gillespie	Colonial Life Arena (10,517); Columbia, SC
March 7, 2026; 2:00 p.m., ESPN	No. 23	No. 24 Vanderbilt; Rivalry	L 82–86	21–10 (11–7)	24 – Evans	10 – Tied	4 – Tied	Thompson–Boling Arena (19,654); Knoxville, TN
SEC Tournament
March 12, 2026; 3:00 p.m., SECN	(5) No. 25	vs. (12) Auburn; Second round	W 72–62	22–10	27 – Ament	8 – Ament	4 – Ament	Bridgestone Arena (15,719); Nashville, TN
March 13, 2026; 3:30 p.m., ESPN	(5) No. 25	vs. (4) No. 22 Vanderbilt; Quarterfinal/Rivalry	L 68–75	22–11	21 – Gillespie	11 – Ament	4 – Gillespie	Bridgestone Arena (17,864); Nashville, TN
NCAA Tournament
March 20, 2026*; 4:25 p.m., TBS	(6 MW) No. 23	vs. (11 MW) Miami (OH); First round	W 78–56	23–11	29 – Gillespie	10 – Estrella	9 – Gillespie	Xfinity Mobile Arena (19,686); Philadelphia, PA
March 22, 2026*; 5:10 p.m., TNT	(6 MW) No. 23	vs. (3 MW) No. 9 Virginia; Second round	W 79–72	24–11	21 – Gillespie	8 – Okpara	9 – Boswell	Xfinity Mobile Arena (19,279); Philadelphia, PA
March 27, 2026*; 10:10 p.m., TBS/TruTV	(6 MW) No. 23	vs. (2 MW) No. 6 Iowa State; Sweet Sixteen	W 76–62	25–11	18 – Ament	10 – Tied	8 – Boswell	United Center (21,508); Chicago, IL
March 29, 2026*; 2:15 p.m., CBS	(6 MW) No. 23	vs. (1 MW) No. 3 Michigan; Elite Eight	L 62–95	25–12	21 – Gillespie	7 – Tied	4 – Gillespie	United Center (20,410); Chicago, IL
*Non-conference game. ^{#}Rankings from AP Poll. (#) Tournament seedings in parentheses. MW=Midwest. All times are in Eastern Time.

For the third straight season, the team sold out all 14,500 season tickets.

== Rankings ==
Ranking movements Legend: ██ Increase in ranking ██ Decrease in ranking RV = Received votes т = Tied with team above or below
	Week																				
Poll	Pre	1	2	3	4	5	6	7	8	9	10	11	12	13	14	15	16	17	18	19	Final
AP	18	20	20	17	13	20	20	19	19	21	24	RV	RV	25	RV	RV	22	23	25	23т	12
Coaches	17	18	17	16	13	20	23	20	20	22	RV	RV	RV	RV	RV	RV	22	25	RV	25	12
