= Jalil Bethea =

American basketball player (born 2005)

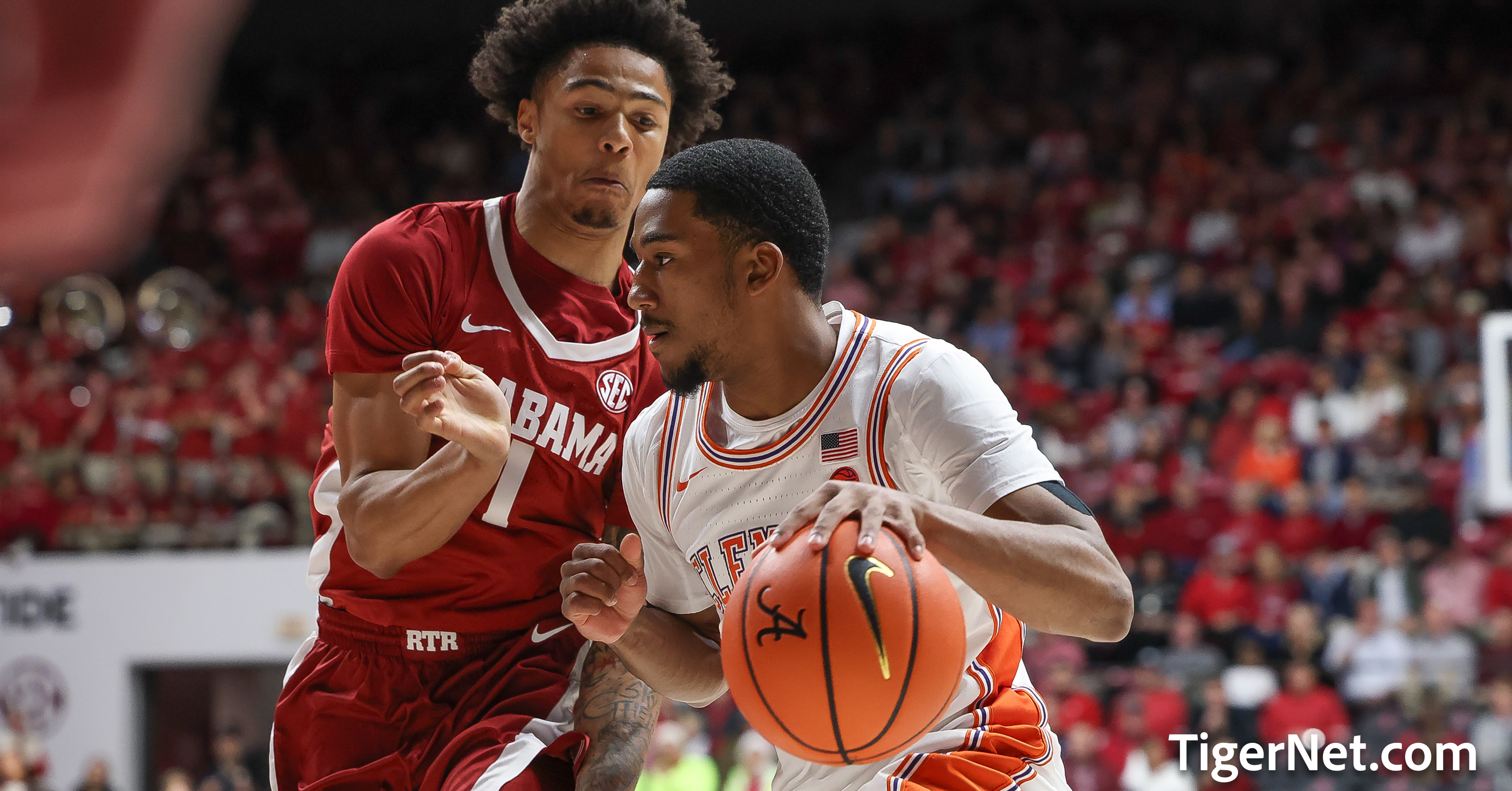
- Bethea (1) playing for Alabama

No. 1 – Pittsburgh Panthers
- Position: Shooting guard
- Conference: Atlantic Coast Conference

Personal information
- Born: December 20, 2005 (age 20) Philadelphia, Pennsylvania, U.S.
- Listed height: 6 ft 5 in (1.96 m)
- Listed weight: 190 lb (86 kg)

Career information
- High school: Archbishop Wood Catholic (Warminster Township, Pennsylvania)
- College: Miami (Florida) (2024–2025); Alabama (2025–2026); Pittsburgh (2026–present)

Career highlights
- McDonald's All-American (2024); Jordan Brand Classic (2024)

Jalil Ali Bethea (born December 20, 2005) is an American college basketball player for the Pittsburgh Panthers of the Atlantic Coast Conference (ACC). He previously played for the Miami Hurricanes and Alabama Crimson Tide.

== Early life and high school career ==
Bethea grew up in Philadelphia, Pennsylvania and attended Archbishop Wood Catholic High School in Warminster Township, Pennsylvania. He averaged 23.2 points, 3.9 assists, and 7.6 rebounds per game and was named the Philadelphia Catholic League MVP as a junior. Bethea posted 22.7 points, seven rebounds and 3.4 assists per game while leading the Vikings to the Class 6A semifinals. Bethea was selected to play in the 2024 McDonald's All-American Boys Game during his senior year.

=== Recruiting ===
Bethea was a consensus five-star recruit and one of the top players in the 2024 class, according to major recruiting services. He committed to playing college basketball for Miami (Florida) after considering offers from Kansas and Villanova. Bethea signed a National Letter of Intent to play for the Hurricanes on November 8, 2023.

College recruiting
Name	Hometown	School	Height	Weight	Commit date
Jalil Bethea; SG	Philadelphia, PA	Archbishop Wood Catholic (PA)	6 ft 4 in (1.93 m)	175 lb (79 kg)	Sep 20, 2023
Jalil Bethea; SG	Recruit ratings: Rivals: 247Sports: On3: ESPN: (92)				
Overall recruit ranking: Rivals: 7 247Sports: 7 On3: 8 ESPN: 10
Note: In many cases, Scout, Rivals, 247Sports, On3, and ESPN may conflict in their listings of height and weight.; In these cases, the average was taken. ESPN grades are on a 100-point scale.; Sources: "Miami 2024 Basketball Commitments". Rivals.; "2024 Miami Hurricanes Recruiting Class". ESPN.; "2024 Team Ranking". Rivals.

== College career ==
Bethea averaged 7.1 points, 2.1 rebounds, 1.2 assists, and 0.6 steals per game as a freshman at Miami. Following the season, he entered the NCAA transfer portal and ultimately committed to Alabama, choosing the Crimson Tide over Kansas State and NC State. Bethea was hampered by injuries and averaged 3.9 points and 1.7 rebounds per game. He transferred to Pittsburgh after the season.

== Career statistics ==
Legend
GP	Games played	GS	Games started	MPG	Minutes per game
FG%	Field goal percentage	3P%	3-point field goal percentage	FT%	Free throw percentage
RPG	Rebounds per game	APG	Assists per game	SPG	Steals per game
BPG	Blocks per game	PPG	Points per game	**Bold**	Career high

=== College ===
Year	Team	GP	GS	MPG	FG%	3P%	FT%	RPG	APG	SPG	BPG	PPG
2024–25	Miami	31	16	18.9	.368	.326	.820	2.1	1.2	.6	.1	7.1
2025–26	Alabama	26	0	8.0	.375	.314	.806	1.7	.5	.2	.1	3.9

== Personal life ==
Bethea is the son of Jacqueline Kamper and Steve Bethea. His father works at Horizon House, and his mother works in Food service at Penn Presbyterian Hospital. He has four siblings.
