= Micah Handlogten =

American basketball player (born 2003)

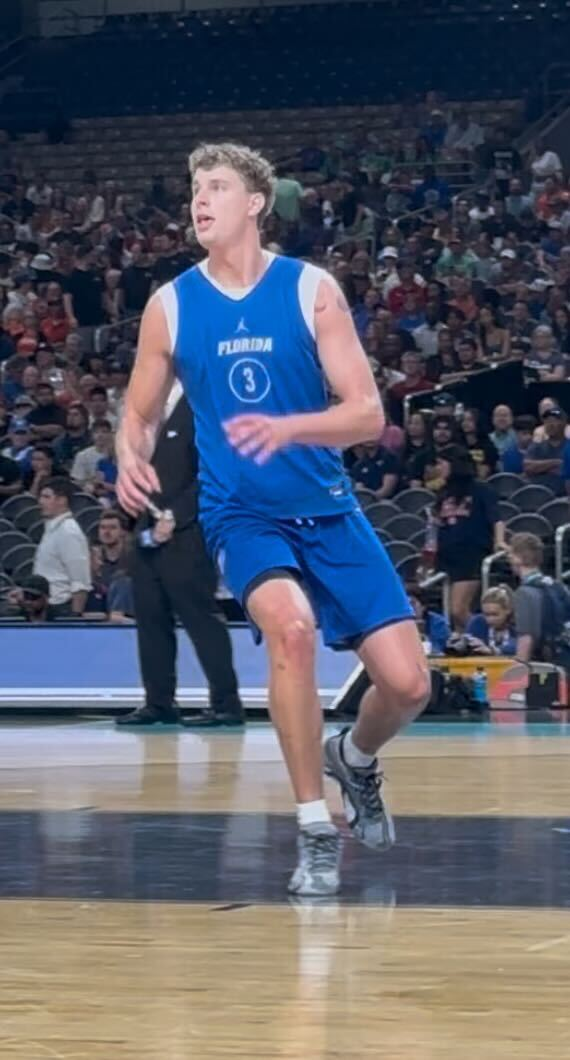
- Handlogten at the 2025 Final Four

No. 2 – Ole Miss Rebels
- Position: Center
- League: Southeastern Conference

Personal information
- Born: December 17, 2003 (age 22)
- Listed height: 7 ft 1 in (2.16 m)
- Listed weight: 265 lb (120 kg)

Career information
- High school: Southlake Christian Academy (Huntersville, North Carolina)
- College: Marshall (2022–2023); Florida (2023–2026); Ole Miss (2026–present)

Career highlights
- NCAA champion (2025); Sun Belt Freshman of the Year (2023)

Micah Handlogten (born December 17, 2003) is an American college basketball player for the Ole Miss Rebels of the Southeastern Conference (SEC). He previously played for the Marshall Thundering Herd and Florida Gators.

== Early life and high school career ==
Handlogten attended SouthLake Christian Academy in Huntersville, North Carolina, where he averaged 17 points, 13 rebounds and four blocks per game as a senior. He was rated as a three-star recruit and committed to play college basketball for the Marshall Thundering Herd.

== College career ==
=== Marshall (2022–2023) ===
As a freshman in 2022-23, Handlogten averaged 7.6 points, 9.8 rebounds, 2.3 blocks, and 1.3 steals per game and was named the Sun Belt Conference Freshman of the Year. After the season, he entered his name into the NCAA transfer portal.

=== Florida (2023–2026) ===
Handlogten transferred to play for the Florida Gators. On December 19, 2023, he racked up nine points and nine rebounds in a double overtime win against Michigan. On February 10, 2024, Handlogten posted four points, nine rebounds, and five blocks in a win over Auburn. Just two minutes into the 2024 SEC championship game, he suffered a broken leg after going up for a rebound, causing him to miss the remainder of the year. In his first year with Florida in 2023-24, Handlogten averaged 5.3 points and 6.9 rebounds per game in 32 starts.

Heading into the 2024-25 season, he was expected to miss the entire season and use a medical redshirt. However on February 15, 2025, Handlogten made his return, putting up two points, three rebounds, and five assists in 20 minutes in a win over South Carolina. His return followed injuries to two of Florida's frontcourt players. He played in the last seven games of the regular season, the SEC tournament (which Florida won), and the NCAA tournament, which Florida also won. In the 2025 NCAA tournament, Florida won multiple games by close scores. In the finals, Florida was down by 12 points late in the second half before winning by 2, 65-63. Handlogten had four rebounds and one blocked shot in the game.

=== Ole Miss (2026–2027) ===
In August 2026, Handlogten signed to play for Ole Miss for a fifth season. He remains ineligible, though he filed a medical waiver with the NCAA requesting his junior season that he played 16 games to be struck from his eligible years. Handlogten has not filed any state lawsuit regarding the new five-for-five rulings.

== Professional career ==
Handlogten played in the 2026 NBA Summer League with the Utah Jazz.

== Personal life ==
He is the son of former NBA player Ben Handlogten, who spent two seasons with the Utah Jazz.
