= SouthLake Christian Academy =

American private Christian day school in North Carolina

Location
- 13820 Hagers Ferry Road; Huntersville, North Carolina 28078; United States; 35°25′45″N 80°56′11″W

Information
- Type: Private day school
- Religious affiliation: Christian
- Established: 1994 (32 years ago)
- CEEB code: 341927
- Headmaster: Matthew Kerlin
- Faculty: 150
- Gender: Co-educational
- Enrollment: 645
- Colors: Blue and gold
- Athletics conference: NCISAA — Metrolina Athletic Conference
- Mascot: Eagles
- Website: www.southlakechristian.org

SouthLake Christian Academy is a co-educational, private day school in the Lake Norman area north of Charlotte, North Carolina. SouthLake draws students from suburban areas across six counties. The campus is 30 acres, and teaches grades from junior kindergarten to twelfth grade.

SouthLake Christian Academy currently serves 645 students in grades Junior Kindergarten through 12th. Tuition ranges from $10,300.00 to $15,500.00. Approximately 14% of students receive financial assistance.

On July 28, 2016, former SouthLake Christian Academy headmaster, Wayne Parker, pleaded guilty to stealing 9 million dollars from the school. Mr. Parker was sentenced to 5 years in prison on November 30 of the same year. The following December, former pastor of the associated church and founder of the school, Wade Malloy, pleaded guilty to wire fraud for helping Parker steal the money. Malloy was sentenced and has served time.

== Notable alumni ==
- Will Grier (2014-transferred), NFL quarterback
- Micah Handlogten (2022), American basketball player, 2025 NCAA champion with Florida
