= Dave Klatsky =

American basketball coach

Current position
- Title: Assistant coach
- Team: Florida
- Conference: Southeastern Conference

Playing career
- 1999–2003: Penn

Coaching career (HC unless noted)
- 2007–2011: Stevens Tech (assistant)
- 2011–2022: Colgate (assistant)
- 2022–2025: NYU
- 2025–present: Florida (assistant)

Head coaching record
- Overall: 68–16 (.810)
- Tournaments: 6–3 (NCAA Division III)

Accomplishments and honors

Championships
- 2 UAA regular season (2024, 2025)

Awards
- 2 UAA Coach of the Year (2024, 2025)

David Klatsky is an American college basketball coach who is an assistant coach of the Florida Gators men's basketball team. He was previously the head coach of the NYU Violets.

== Early life and playing career ==
Klatsky grew up in Holmdel Township, New Jersey and attended Holmdel High School. He was named first-team All-Shore Conference as a senior as Holmdel won its second straight state championship. He played college basketball for the Penn Quakers. As a sophomore, he set a single-season record for assists with 162. Klatsky was selected to represent the United States in the 2001 Maccabiah Games, but decided not to participate due to safety concerns rising from the Second Intifada.

== Coaching career ==
After graduating from Penn, Klatsky worked in Manhattan as an equity trader. He began his coaching career as an assistant at Stevens Institute of Technology in 2007 as an assistant while still holding his day job. Klatsky was then hired as an assistant at Colgate by his former Penn teammate, Matt Langel, in 2011.

Klatsky was hired as the head coach at NYU on May 17, 2022. NYU went 18–8 in his first season and earned an at-large bid to the 2023 NCAA Division III tournament. In his second season, Klatsky coached the Violets to a share of the University Athletic Association regular season title, the program's first in 30 years. The Violets won the UAA outright the following season.

Klatsky left NYU to take an assistant coaching position with the Florida Gators shortly after the team won the national championship.

== Head coaching record ==
Statistics overview
Season	Team	Overall	Conference	Standing	Postseason
NYU (University Athletic Association) (2022–present)
2022–23	NYU	18–8	7–7		NCAA Division III First Round
2023–24	NYU	21–6	10–4	T–1st	NCAA Division III Second Round
2024–25	NYU	29–2	13–1	1st	NCAA Division III Runner-up
NYU:		68–16 (.810)	30–12 (.714)		
Total:		68–16 (.810)			
National champion Postseason invitational champion Conference regular season champion Conference regular season and conference tournament champion Division regular season champion Division regular season and conference tournament champion Conference tournament champion

== Personal life ==
Klatsky's brother-in-law, Kevin Hovde, is the head basketball coach at Columbia.
