= Xzayvier Brown =

American basketball player

No. 1 – Oklahoma Sooners
- Position: Shooting guard
- League: Southeastern Conference

Personal information
- Listed height: 6 ft 3 in (1.91 m)
- Listed weight: 185 lb (84 kg)

Career information
- High school: Roman Catholic (Philadelphia, Pennsylvania)
- College: Saint Joseph's (2023–2025); Oklahoma (2025–present)

Career highlights
- First-team All-Atlantic 10 (2025); Atlantic 10 Rookie of the Year (2024); Atlantic 10 All-Rookie team (2024)

Xzayvier Brown is an American college basketball player for the Oklahoma Sooners of the Southeastern Conference (SEC). He previously played for the Saint Joseph's Hawks.

== Early life and high school ==
Brown grew up in Philadelphia, Pennsylvania and attended Roman Catholic High School. He committed to play college basketball at Saint Joseph's, where his stepfather was an assistant coach, over offers from USC, VCU, Florida Gulf Coast, Marquette, and Drexel.

== College career ==
Brown began his college basketball career at Saint Joseph's. He was named the Atlantic 10 Conference Rookie of the Year and the Philadelphia Big 5 Rookie of the Year as a freshman after averaging 12.7 points, 3.3 assists, 4.0 rebounds, and 1.8 steals per game. Brown was named first-team All-Atlantic 10 after averaging 17.6 points, 5.2 rebounds, 4.3 assists, and 1.5 steals per game during his sophomore season. After the end of the season, he entered the NCAA transfer portal.

Brown committed to transfer to Oklahoma.

== Personal life ==
Brown's stepfather, Justin Scott, played college basketball at East Stroudsburg before becoming a coach. Scott was the associate head coach at Saint Joseph's and was hired as an assistant at Oklahoma in 2025.
