= Derrion Reid =

American basketball player (born 2006)

No. 35 – Oklahoma Sooners
- Position: Small forward
- League: Southeastern Conference

Personal information
- Born: June 27, 2006 (age 20)
- Listed height: 6 ft 8 in (2.03 m)
- Listed weight: 225 lb (102 kg)

Career information
- High school: Grovetown (Grovetown, Georgia); Prolific Prep (Napa, California)
- College: Alabama (2024–2025); Oklahoma (2025–present)

Career highlights
- McDonald's All-American (2024); Jordan Brand Classic (2024)

Derrion Reid (born June 27, 2006) is an American college basketball player for the Oklahoma Sooners of the Southeastern Conference (SEC). He previously played for the Alabama Crimson Tide.

== Early life and high school ==
Reid grew up in Grovetown, Georgia and initially attended Grovetown High School. He averaged 9.8 points and 3.4 rebounds during his sophomore season as Grovetown won the Class 6A state championship. Reid transferred to Prolific Prep in Napa, California prior to the start of his senior year. Reid was selected to play in the 2024 McDonald's All-American Boys Game during his senior year.

=== Recruiting ===
Reid was a consensus five-star recruit and one of the top players in the 2024 class, according to major recruiting services. He committed to play college basketball at Alabama after considering offers from Georgia and Florida State. Reid signed a National Letter of Intent to play for the Crimson Tide on January 10, 2024.

== College career ==
Reid averaged 6.0 points and 2.8 rebounds per game as a freshman but missed 13 games due to injury. Following the season he transferred to Oklahoma.

== Personal life ==
Reid's mother, Marie, played college basketball at South Carolina State.
