= 2025–26 Texas Longhorns men's basketball team =

American college basketball season

2025–26 Texas Longhorns men's basketball

NCAA tournament, Sweet Sixteen
- Conference: Southeastern Conference

Ranking
- Coaches: No. 24
- AP: No. 22
- Record: 21–15 (9–9 SEC)
- Head coach: Sean Miller (1st season)
- Associate head coach: Kenya Hunter; Ulric Maligi (1st season)
- Assistant coaches: Adam Cohen (1st season); David Miller (1st season); Ryan Anderson (1st season)
- Home arena: Moody Center

2025–26 Southeastern Conference men's basketball standings
	Conf.				Overall
Team	W		L	PCT	W		L	PCT
No. 9 Florida	16	–	2	.889	27	–	8	.771
No. 16 Alabama	13	–	5	.722	25	–	10	.714
No. 13 Arkansas †	13	–	5	.722	28	–	9	.757
No. 19 Vanderbilt	11	–	7	.611	27	–	9	.750
No. 12 Tennessee	11	–	7	.611	25	–	12	.676
Texas A&M	11	–	7	.611	22	–	12	.647
Georgia	10	–	8	.556	22	–	11	.667
Missouri	10	–	8	.556	20	–	13	.606
Kentucky	10	–	8	.556	22	–	14	.611
No. 22 Texas	9	–	9	.500	21	–	15	.583
Oklahoma	7	–	11	.389	21	–	16	.568
Auburn	7	–	11	.389	22	–	16	.579
Mississippi State	5	–	13	.278	13	–	19	.406
South Carolina	4	–	14	.222	13	–	19	.406
Ole Miss	4	–	14	.222	15	–	20	.429
LSU	3	–	15	.167	15	–	17	.469
† 2026 SEC tournament winner Rankings from AP poll

The 2025–26 Texas Longhorns men's basketball team represented the University of Texas at Austin in the 2025–26 NCAA Division I men's basketball season. They played their home games at the Moody Center in Austin, Texas, as second-year members of the Southeastern Conference. The Longhorns were led by first-year head coach Sean Miller.

== Previous season ==
The Longhorns finished the 2024–25 season 19–16, 6–12 in SEC play to finish in a tie for 13th place. As the No. 13 seed in the SEC tournament, they defeated Vanderbilt and Texas A&M before losing to Tennessee in the quarterfinals. They received an at-large bid to the NCAA tournament as a No. 11 seed in the Midwest region. There, they lost to Xavier in the First Four.

On March 23, 2025, the school fired head coach Rodney Terry. The next day, the school named Xavier head coach Sean Miller the team's new coach.

== Offseason ==
=== Returning players ===
Texas returners
Name	Number	Pos.	Height	Weight	Year	Hometown
Jordan Pope	0	G	6'2"	175 lbs	Senior	Napa, CA
Tramon Mark	12	G	6'5"	200 lbs	Graduate student	Dickinson, TX
Chendall Weaver	2	G	6'3"	180 lbs	Senior	Mansfield, TX
Nic Codie	10	PF	6'8"	200 lbs	Sophomore	Carrollton, TX
Anthon McDermott	33	G	6'5"	185 lbs	Sophomore	Longview, TX
Cole Bott	7	F	6'6"	195 lbs	Graduate student	Highlands Ranch, CO

=== Departures ===
Texas departures
Name	Number	Pos.	Height	Weight	Year	Hometown	Reason for departure
Preston Clark	8	F	6'6"	220	Sophomore (redshirt)	Austin, TX	Transferred to Maryville (MO)
Jamie Vinson	4	F	6'11"	225	Freshman	Austin, TX	Transferred to Texas A&M
Malik Presley	13	G/F	6'6"	200	Sophomore	San Marcos, TX	Transferred to George Mason
Tre Johnson	20	G	6'6"	190	Freshman	Garland, TX	Drafted by Washington Wizards
Devon Pryor	22	F	6'7"	185	Sophomore	Houston, TX	Transferred to Oregon
Arthur Kaluma	6	F	6'7"	225	Senior	Glendale, AZ	Signed with Los Angeles Lakers
Kadin Shedrick	5	F	6'11"	231	Graduate student	Holly Springs, NC	Signed with Cleveland Cavaliers
Jayson Kent	25	F	6'8"	215	Graduate student	Oak Forest, IL	Signed with Rip City Remix
Ze’Rik Onyema	21	F	6'9"	235	Senior	El Paso, TX	Signed with Vilpas Vikings
Julian Larry	1	G	6'3"	185	Graduate student	Frisco, TX	Signed with Uni Baskets Münster

==== Coaching staff departures ====
Name	Position	New team	New position	Source
Rodney Terry	Head coach	New Orleans Pelicans	NBA scout, ESPN analyst	
Brandon Chappell	Assistant coach	Arizona	Assistant coach	
Frank Haith	Assistant coach	Texas A&M	Assistant coach	
Steve McClain	Assistant coach	Tennessee	Assistant coach	
Byron Jones	Assistant coach	Indiana State	Assistant coach	
Nick Matson	Assistant coach	New Mexico State	Assistant coach	
Darby Rich	Head strength coach	Texas A&M	Head strength coach	

=== Acquisitions ===
==== Incoming transfers ====
Texas incoming transfers
Name	Number	Pos.	Height	Weight	Year	Hometown	Previous school	Source
Lassina Traore	23	F	6'10"	245	Senior	Abidjan, Ivory Coast	Xavier	
Matas Vokietaitis	8	F	7'0"	245	Sophomore	Marijampolė, Lithuania	FAU	
Camden Heide	5	F	6'7"	205	Junior	Minneapolis, MN	Purdue	
Dailyn Swain	3	F	6'8"	220	Junior	Columbus, OH	Xavier	
Simeon Wilcher	7	G	6'4"	190	Junior	Plainfield, NJ	St. John's	

==== 2025 recruiting class ====
College recruiting
Name	Hometown	School	Height	Weight	Commit date
John Clark; C	Houston, TX	Link Academy (MO)	6 ft 10 in (2.08 m)	235 lb (107 kg)	Nov 1, 2024
John Clark; C	Recruit ratings: Rivals: 247Sports: ESPN: (83)				
Lewis Obiorah; C	London, England	Barking Abbey Basketball Academy	7 ft 1 in (2.16 m)	245 lb (111 kg)	May 17, 2025
Lewis Obiorah; C	Recruit ratings: 247Sports:				
Declan Duru; PF	Munich, Germany	Real Madrid	6 ft 8 in (2.03 m)	225 lb (102 kg)	Jul 8, 2025
Declan Duru; PF	Recruit ratings: 247Sports:				
Overall recruit ranking: Rivals: 51 247Sports: 36 ESPN: —
Note: In many cases, Scout, Rivals, 247Sports, On3, and ESPN may conflict in their listings of height and weight.; In these cases, the average was taken. ESPN grades are on a 100-point scale.; Sources: "Texas 2025 Basketball Commitments". Rivals.; "2025 Texas Longhorns Recruiting Class". ESPN.; "2025 Team Ranking". Rivals.

*ESPN has not made 2025 recruiting class rankings yet.

2025 overall class rankings

Website	National rank	Conference rank	5-star recruits	4-star recruits	Total
ESPN	--	--	0	1	3
On3 Recruits	51st	14th	0	2	3
247 Sports	36th	10th	0	2	3

==== Coaching staff additions ====
Name	Position	Previous team	Previous position	Source
Sean Miller	Head coach	Xavier	Head coach	
Kenya Hunter	Assistant coach	Indiana	Associate head coach	
Ulric Maligi	Assistant coach	Kansas State	Associate head coach	
Adam Cohen	Assistant coach	Xavier	Assistant coach	
David Miller	Assistant coach	Xavier	Assistant coach	
Ryan Anderson	Assistant coach	Xavier	Assistant coach	
Andy Kettler	Head strength coach	Xavier	Head strength coach	

== Preseason ==
=== Award watch lists ===
Listed in the order that they were released

Award	Player	Position	Year	Source
Julius Erving Award	Dailyn Swain	F	Junior	

== Roster ==
2025–26 Texas Longhorns men's basketball team
Players
Coaches

Pos.	#	Name	Height	Weight	Year	Previous school	Hometown
G	0	Jordan Pope	6 ft 1 in (1.85 m)	180 lb (82 kg)	Sr	Oregon State	Oakley, CA
F	1	Cole Bott	6 ft 6 in (1.98 m)	200 lb (91 kg)	GS	Northfield Mount Hermon School	Highlands Ranch, CO
G	2	Chendall Weaver	6 ft 3 in (1.91 m)	180 lb (82 kg)	Sr	UT Arlington	Mansfield, TX
G/F	3	Dailyn Swain	6 ft 8 in (2.03 m)	225 lb (102 kg)	Jr	Xavier	Columbus, OH
F	4	Declan Duru	6 ft 8 in (2.03 m)	235 lb (107 kg)	Fr	Real Madrid U19	Munich, Germany
F	5	Camden Heide	6 ft 7 in (2.01 m)	215 lb (98 kg)	Jr	Purdue	Minneapolis, MN
G	7	Simeon Wilcher	6 ft 4 in (1.93 m)	200 lb (91 kg)	Jr	St. John's	Plainfield, NJ
F	8	Matas Vokietaitis	7 ft 0 in (2.13 m)	255 lb (116 kg)	So	FAU	Marijampolė, Lithuania
F	9	John Clark	6 ft 9 in (2.06 m)	240 lb (109 kg)	Fr	Link Academy (MO)	Houston, TX
F	10	Nic Codie	6 ft 8 in (2.03 m)	220 lb (100 kg)	So	Newman Smith	Dallas, TX
G	12	Tramon Mark	6 ft 5 in (1.96 m)	210 lb (95 kg)	GS	Arkansas	Dickinson, TX
C	14	Lewis Obiorah	7 ft 0 in (2.13 m)	250 lb (113 kg)	Fr	Barking Abbey Basketball Academy	London, England
F	23	Lassina Traore	6 ft 9 in (2.06 m)	245 lb (111 kg)	GS	Xavier	Abidjan, Ivory Coast
G	33	Anthon McDermott	6 ft 4 in (1.93 m)	200 lb (91 kg)	RS Fr	Hallsville	Longview, TX
G	44	Brandon Taylor (W)	5 ft 10 in (1.78 m)	175 lb (79 kg)	GS	East Texas A&M	Coppell, TX

Head coach

- Sean Miller (Pittsburgh)

Assistant coach(es)

- Kenya Hunter (Duquesne)
- Ulric Maligi (Howard)
- Adam Cohen (Arizona)
- David Miller (Arizona)
- Ryan Anderson (Arizona)

Legend

- (C) Team captain
- (S) Suspended
- (I) Ineligible
- (W) Walk-on
- Injured
- Current redshirt

Roster
Last update: August 28, 2025

== Schedule and results ==
Date time, TV	Rank^{#}	Opponent^{#}	Result	Record	High points	High rebounds	High assists	Site (attendance) city, state
Non-conference regular season
November 4, 2025*; 7:45 p.m., ESPN		vs. No. 6 Duke; Dick Vitale Invitational	L 60–75	0–1	16 – Swain	9 – Traore	2 – Wilcher	Spectrum Center (12,435); Charlotte, NC
November 8, 2025*; 2:00 p.m., SECN+/ESPN+		Lafayette	W 97–60	1–1	14 – Vokietaitis	11 – Vokietaitis	6 – Tied	Moody Center (10,712); Austin, TX
November 12, 2025*; 7:00 p.m., SECN+/ESPN+		Fairleigh Dickinson	W 93–58	2–1	20 – Mark	10 – Traore	3 – Pope	Moody Center (9,820); Austin, TX
November 15, 2025*; 12:00 p.m., SECN+/ESPN+		Kansas City	W 71–55	3–1	13 – Swain	12 – Traore	4 – Weaver	Moody Center (10,593); Austin, TX
November 18, 2025*; 8:00 p.m., SECN		Rider	W 99–65	4–1	26 – Swain	5 – Tied	5 – Tied	Moody Center (10,641); Austin, TX
November 24, 2025*; 10:30 p.m., ESPN2		vs. Arizona State; Southwest Maui Invitational Quarterfinals	L 86–87	4–2	24 – Swain	8 – Vokietaitis	3 – Tied	Lahaina Civic Center (2,400); Lahaina, HI
November 25, 2025*; 9:30 p.m., ESPN2		at Chaminade; Southwest Maui Invitational Consolation 2nd Round	W 119–78	5–2	19 – Mark	14 – Traore	8 – Pope	Lahaina Civic Center (2,400); Lahaina, HI
November 26, 2025*; 8:30 p.m., ESPN2		vs. No. 23 NC State; Southwest Maui Invitational 5th Place Game	W 102–97	6–2	28 – Pope	8 – Weaver	7 – Swain	Lahaina Civic Center (2,400); Lahaina, HI
December 3, 2025*; 8:15 p.m., ESPNU		Virginia; ACC/SEC Challenge	L 69–88	6–3	15 – Swain	10 – Swain	4 – Swain	Moody Center (10,802); Austin, TX
December 8, 2025*; 7:00 p.m., SECN		Southern	W 95–69	7–3	28 – Vokietaitis	6 – Tied	5 – Swain	Moody Center (10,410); Austin, TX
December 12, 2025*; 7:00 p.m., FOX		at No. 5 UConn	L 63–71	7–4	15 – Tied	7 – Traore	2 – Vokietaitis	PeoplesBank Arena (15,495); Hartford, CT
December 16, 2025*; 7:00 p.m., SECN+/ESPN+		Le Moyne	W 95–53	8–4	18 – Mark	11 – Traore	5 – Swain	Moody Center (10,532); Austin, TX
December 22, 2025*; 7:00 p.m., SECN+/ESPN+		Maryland Eastern Shore	W 94–71	9–4	22 – Vokietaitis	10 – Swain	4 – Swain	Moody Center (10,888); Austin, TX
SEC regular season
January 3, 2026; 5:00 p.m., SECN		Mississippi State	L 98–101 ^{OT}	9–5 (0–1)	34 – Swain	14 – Swain	4 – Wilcher	Moody Center (10,823); Austin, TX
January 6, 2026; 8:00 p.m., ESPN2		at No. 21 Tennessee	L 71–85	9–6 (0–2)	20 – Mark	5 – Mark	4 – Swain	Thompson–Boling Arena (17,402); Knoxville, TN
January 10, 2026; 7:00 p.m., ESPN		at No. 13 Alabama	W 92–88	10–6 (1–2)	28 – Pope	8 – Tied	3 – Wilcher	Coleman Coliseum (13,474); Tuscaloosa, AL
January 14, 2026; 8:00 p.m., ESPN2		No. 10 Vanderbilt	W 80–64	11–6 (2–2)	22 – Vokietaitis	9 – Tied	7 – Swain	Moody Center (11,422); Austin, TX
January 17, 2026; 5:00 p.m., ESPN		Texas A&M; Lone Star Showdown	L 70–74	11–7 (2–3)	17 – Swain	9 – Vokietaitas	3 – Pope	Moody Center (11,422); Austin, TX
January 21, 2026; 6:00 p.m., SECN		at Kentucky	L 80–85	11–8 (2–4)	29 – Swain	11 – Vokietaitis	3 – Swain	Rupp Arena (19,298); Lexington, KY
January 24, 2026; 12:00 p.m., SECN		No. 21 Georgia	W 87–67	12–8 (3–4)	26 – Swain	8 – Vokietaitis	5 – Vokietaitis	Moody Center (10,523); Austin, TX
January 28, 2026; 6:00 p.m., ESPN2		at Auburn	L 82–88	12–9 (3–5)	30 – Swain	7 – Swain	4 – Swain	Neville Arena (9,121); Auburn, AL
January 31, 2026; 1:00 p.m., ESPN2		at Oklahoma	W 79–69	13–9 (4–5)	20 – Swain	10 – Swain	6 – Swain	Lloyd Noble Center (9,198); Norman, OK
February 3, 2026; 6:00 p.m., SECN		South Carolina	W 84–75	14–9 (5–5)	22 – Swain	10 – Swain	4 – Wilcher	Moody Center (10,286); Austin, TX
February 7, 2026; 1:00 p.m., ESPN2		Ole Miss	W 79–68	15–9 (6–5)	27 – Vokietaitis	9 – Swain	4 – Mark	Moody Center (10,585); Austin, TX
February 14, 2026; 7:30 p.m., ESPN2		at Missouri	W 85–68	16–9 (7–5)	25 – Swain	10 – Vokietaitis	4 – Wilcher	Mizzou Arena (15,061); Columbia, MO
February 17, 2026; 8:00 p.m., SECN		LSU	W 88–85	17–9 (8–5)	21 – Swain	10 – Swain	4 – Wilcher	Moody Center (10,908); Austin, TX
February 21, 2026; 2:30 p.m., SECN		at Georgia	L 80–91	17–10 (8–6)	22 – Vokietaitis	6 – Swain	4 – Weaver	Stegeman Coliseum (10,523); Athens, GA
February 25, 2026; 6:00 p.m., ESPN2		No. 7 Florida	L 71–84	17–11 (8–7)	21 – Swain	7 – Swain	1 – Tied	Moody Center (11,313); Austin, TX
February 28, 2026; 3:00 p.m., ESPN2		at Texas A&M; Lone Star Showdown	W 76–70	18–11 (9–7)	23 – Mark	10 – Swain	2 – Mark	Reed Arena (12,107); College Station, TX
March 4, 2026; 6:00 p.m., ESPN2		at No. 20 Arkansas	L 85–105	18–12 (9–8)	21 – Vokietaitis	9 – Swain	6 – Swain	Bud Walton Arena (19,200); Fayetteville, AR
March 7, 2026; 7:30 p.m., SECN		Oklahoma	L 85–88 ^{OT}	18–13 (9–9)	30 – Pope	7 – Swain	8 – Swain	Moody Center (11,315); Austin, TX
SEC tournament
March 11, 2026; 6:00 p.m., SECN	(10)	vs. (15) Ole Miss; First round	L 66–76	18–14	22 – Swain	12 – Swain	4 – Swain	Bridgestone Arena (10,701); Nashville, TN
NCAA tournament
March 17, 2026; 8:15 p.m., truTV	(11 W)	vs. (11 W) NC State; First Four	W 68–66	19–14	17 – Mark	10 – Weaver	4 – Swain	UD Arena (11,756); Dayton, OH
March 19, 2026; 6:25 p.m., TBS	(11 W)	vs. (6 W) BYU; First round	W 79–71	20–14	23 – Vokietaitis	16 – Vokietaitis	6 – Swain	Moda Center (14,070); Portland, OR
March 21, 2026*; 6:10 p.m., TBS	(11 W)	vs. (3 W) No. 12 Gonzaga; Second round	W 74–68	21–14	17 – Vokietaitis	9 – Vokietaitis	6 – Swain	Moda Center (14,385); Portland, OR
March 26, 2026; 6:10 p.m., CBS	(11 W)	vs. (2 W) No. 8 Purdue; Sweet Sixteen	L 77–79	21–15	29 – Mark	9 – Swain	5 – Swain	SAP Center (15,341); San Jose, CA
*Non-conference game. ^{#}Rankings from AP poll. (#) Tournament seedings in parentheses. W=West. All times are in Central Time.

== Awards and honors ==
Weekly SEC honors
Honors	Player	Position	Date awarded	Ref.
SEC Men’s Basketball Co-Player of the Week	Dailyn Swain	F	February 16, 2026	

Conference honors
Honors	Player	Position
All-SEC Second Team	Dailyn Swain	G/F
SEC Newcomer of the Year	Dailyn Swain	G/F

== Rankings ==
Ranking movements Legend: ██ Increase in ranking ██ Decrease in ranking — = Not ranked RV = Received votes
	Week																				
Poll	Pre	1	2	3	4	5	6	7	8	9	10	11	12	13	14	15	16	17	18	19	Final
AP	RV	RV	—	—	—	—	—	—	—	RV	—	—	—	—	—	—	—	—	—	—	22
Coaches	RV	RV	—	—	—	—	—	—	—	—	—	—	—	—	—	—	—	—	—	—	24
