= Tramon Mark =

American basketball player (born 2001)

Free agent
- Position: Shooting guard

Personal information
- Born: September 30, 2001 (age 25) Nassau Bay, Texas, U.S.
- Listed height: 6 ft 5 in (1.96 m)
- Listed weight: 210 lb (95 kg)

Career information
- High school: Dickinson (Dickinson, Texas)
- College: Houston (2020–2023); Arkansas (2023–2024); Texas (2024–2026)
- NBA draft: 2026: undrafted

Tramon Kendall Mark (born September 30, 2001) is an American basketball player. He played college basketball for the Houston Cougars, Arkansas Razorbacks, and Texas Longhorns.

== High school ==
Mark attended Dickinson High School in Dickinson, Texas, where he played basketball. After his freshman year, Mark was named the District 24-6A Newcomer of the Year. The following year, Mark was named the 24-6A Offensive Most Valuable Player. During his junior year, Mark averaged 26.5 points per game, which included a 52-point performance in a win against Manvel High School. For his efforts, Mark was named to the Texas Association of Basketball Coaches (TABC) 6A All-State team and the Houston Chronicle All-Greater Houston first-team. During his senior year, Mark set the school record for most points scored in a game for Dickinson, scoring 57 in a win against Cypress Creek High School. Mark averaged 29.3 points in his senior season, en route to leading Dickinson to its first state tournament in 65 years before it was cancelled due to the COVID-19 pandemic. For his efforts on the season, Mark was awarded the Guy V. Lewis Award by the Houston Area Basketball Coaches Association, which is given to the best men's basketball player in the Greater Houston area.

== College career ==
=== Houston ===
After high school, Mark first committed to the University of Houston, where he would play college basketball. In his debut for Houston, Mark scored a season-high 22 points in a win against Lamar. For that performance, along with scoring 9 points against Boise State the following game, Mark was named the American Freshman of the Week. On December 5, 2020, Mark made his first career collegiate start, scoring 18 in a win against South Carolina. For that outing and an 11-point performance the previous game against Texas Tech, Mark was named the American Freshman of the Week for the second week in a row. On February 6, Mark tied his season-high in points with 22 in a win against Our Lady of the Lake. On March 7, Mark made a game-winning, three-point shot as time expired as part of an 8-point performance against Memphis. In the Round of 32 during the 2021 NCAA Tournament, Mark had 8 points in the win against Rutgers, which included a go-ahead shot while being fouled and a subsequent made free throw with under 30 seconds remaining.

Mark missed the first three games of the 2021–22 season due to a shoulder injury he sustained in a preseason scrimmage. On December 3, Mark matched his career-high of 22 points in a win against Bryant. After reaggravating his injury on December 11 against Alabama, Mark underwent a successful left shoulder surgery that ended his season, with him only playing in seven games on the season and taking a medical redshirt.

On November 14, 2022, Mark set a then-career high in points scored with 23 in a win against Oral Roberts. On February 25, Mark scored 20 points in a win against East Carolina. In the Round of 32 during the 2023 NCAA Tournament, Mark set a career-high in points while at Houston, scoring 26 in a win against Auburn.

=== Arkansas ===
Before the 2023–24 season, Mark transferred to the University of Arkansas, where he would continue playing college basketball. On November 22, 2023, Mark scored 25 points in a double-overtime win against Stanford in the first round of the 2023 Battle 4 Atlantis tournament. During the 3rd place game in the tournament, Mark set a then-career high in points with 34 in a loss against North Carolina. Mark's performance was overshadowed, however, by a hard fall on his back with 1:12 remaining that caused him to exit the game on a stretcher. On December 21, Mark scored 25 points in a win against Abilene Christian. Mark set his career-high in points scored on January 16, with 35 against Texas A&M, which included a game-winning shot with 1.1 seconds remaining. In a rematch against Texas A&M on February 20, Mark scored 26 points to contribute to a win.

=== Texas ===
After one season at Arkansas, Mark transferred to the University of Texas at Austin, where he would finish his college basketball career. Before the season, Mark was named to the preseason third-team All-SEC men's basketball team. On February 15, 2025, Mark had a season-high 26 points in a win against Kentucky. On March 4, Mark scored 24 in an overtime win against Mississippi State.

Mark announced before the 2025–26 season that he would return to Texas for his final year of college basketball. On January 24, 2026, Mark scored 23 points in a win against Georgia. Mark matched that performance with another 23 points on February 28, in a win against Texas A&M. In the First Four round of the 2026 NCAA Tournament, Mark scored 17 points, which included the game-winner with 1.1 seconds left against NC State. Later, in the Sweet Sixteen round, Mark scored a season-high 29 points in a loss against Purdue. For Mark's performance in the tournament as a whole, he was named a member of the West regional all-tournament team.

== Professional career ==
After going undrafted in the 2026 NBA draft, Mark joined the Phoenix Suns for the 2026 NBA Summer League.

== Career statistics ==
Legend
GP	Games played	GS	Games started	MPG	Minutes per game
FG%	Field goal percentage	3P%	3-point field goal percentage	FT%	Free throw percentage
RPG	Rebounds per game	APG	Assists per game	SPG	Steals per game
BPG	Blocks per game	PPG	Points per game	**Bold**	Career high

=== College ===
Year	Team	GP	GS	MPG	FG%	3P%	FT%	RPG	APG	SPG	BPG	PPG
2020–21	Houston	32	4	20.1	.379	.260	.765	3.0	1.7	.9	.2	7.8
2021–22	Houston	7	0	20.4	.455	.278	**.941**	2.4	**2.4**	**1.4**	.3	10.1
2022–23	Houston	**37**	**37**	29.4	.390	.328	.784	**4.9**	1.8	1.1	.4	10.1
2023–24	Arkansas	31	28	**32.5**	**.480**	**.364**	.804	4.3	1.8	1.2	**.8**	**16.2**
2024–25	Texas	29	25	26.9	.406	.346	.747	3.7	1.7	.8	.4	10.6
2025–26	Texas	36	36	28.3	.474	.344	.748	3.5	1.8	.9	.5	14.0
Career		172	130	27.2	.433	.332	.779	3.8	1.8	1.0	.5	11.7
