= 2024–25 Texas Longhorns men's basketball team =

American college basketball season

2024–25 Texas Longhorns men's basketball

Legends Classic champions

NCAA tournament, First Four
- Conference: Southeastern Conference
- Record: 19–16 (6–12 SEC)
- Head coach: Rodney Terry (2nd season)
- Assistant coaches: Frank Haith (2nd season); Steve McClain (3rd season); Brandon Chappell (3rd season); Byron Jones (2nd season); Nick Matson (1st season)
- Home arena: Moody Center

2024–25 Southeastern Conference men's basketball standings
	Conf.				Overall
Team	W		L	PCT	W		L	PCT
No. 4 Auburn	15	–	3	.833	32	–	6	.842
No. 1 Florida †	14	–	4	.778	36	–	4	.900
No. 6 Alabama	13	–	5	.722	28	–	9	.757
No. 5 Tennessee	12	–	6	.667	30	–	8	.789
No. 19 Texas A&M	11	–	7	.611	23	–	11	.676
No. 12 Kentucky	10	–	8	.556	24	–	12	.667
Missouri	10	–	8	.556	22	–	12	.647
No. 18 Ole Miss	10	–	8	.556	24	–	12	.667
No. 20 Arkansas	8	–	10	.444	22	–	14	.611
Mississippi State	8	–	10	.444	21	–	13	.618
Georgia	8	–	10	.444	20	–	13	.606
Vanderbilt	8	–	10	.444	20	–	13	.606
Texas	6	–	12	.333	19	–	16	.543
Oklahoma	6	–	12	.333	20	–	14	.588
LSU	3	–	15	.167	14	–	18	.438
South Carolina	2	–	16	.111	12	–	20	.375
† 2025 SEC tournament winner Rankings from AP poll

The 2024–25 Texas Longhorns men's basketball team represented the University of Texas at Austin in the 2024–25 NCAA Division I men's basketball season. They played their home games at the Moody Center in Austin, Texas, as members of the Southeastern Conference. The Longhorns were led by second-year head coach Rodney Terry. They finished the season 19–16, 6–12 in SEC play to finish in a tie for 13th place. As the No. 13 seed in the SEC tournament, they defeated Vanderbilt and Texas A&M before losing to Tennessee in the quarterfinals. They received an at-large bid to the NCAA tournament as a No. 11 seed in the Midwest region. There they lost to Xavier in the First Four.

On March 23, 2025, the school fired head coach Rodney Terry. The next day, the school named Xavier head coach Sean Miller the team's new coach.

The season marked the first season for Texas as members of the Southeastern Conference.

== Previous season ==
The Longhorns finished the 2023–24 season 21–13, 9–9 in Big 12 play to finish in a tie for seventh place. As the No. 7 seed in the Big 12 tournament, they lost Kansas State in the second round. They received an at-large bid to the NCAA tournament as the No. 7 seed in the Midwest region. They defeated Colorado State in the first round before losing to Tennessee in the round of 32.

The season marked the last for Texas as members of the Big 12 Conference.

== Offseason ==
=== Returning players ===
Texas returners
Name	Number	Pos.	Height	Weight	Year	Hometown
Chendall Weaver	2	G	6'3"	180 lbs	Junior	Mansfield, TX
Cole Bott	12	F	6'6"	195 lbs	Junior	Highlands Ranch, CO
Devon Pryor	22	F	6'7"	180 lbs	Sophomore	Houston, TX
Jackson Prince	24	G	5'10"	165 lbs	Sophomore	Duncanville, TX
Kadin Shedrick	5	F	6'11"	231 lbs	Graduate student	Holly Springs, NC
Preston Clark	20	F	6'6"	220 lbs	Sophomore	Austin, TX
Ze'Rik Onyema	21	F	6'8"	235 lbs	Senior	El Paso, TX

=== Departures ===
Texas departures
Name	Number	Pos.	Height	Weight	Year	Hometown	Reason for departures
Brock Cunningham	30	F	6'6"	210 lbs	Graduate student	Austin, TX	Signed with Mons-Hainaut
Dylan Disu	1	F	6'9"	225 lbs	Graduate student	Pflugerville, TX	Signed with Toronto Raptors
Ithiel Horton	9	G	6'5"	200 lbs	Graduate student	Vauxhall, NJ	Signed with Grand Rapids Gold
Max Abmas	3	G	6'0"	175 lbs	Graduate student	Rockwall, TX	Signed with Utah Jazz
Alex Anamekwe	14	F	6'5"	200 lbs	Sophomore	McKinney, TX	Transferred to Lubbock Christian
Chris Johnson	0	G	6'5"	180 lbs	Freshman	Missouri City, TX	Transferred to Stephen F. Austin
Dillon Mitchell	23	F	6'8"	205 lbs	Sophomore	Tampa, FL	Transferred to Cincinnati
Gavin Perryman	13	G	6'1"	190 lbs	Redshirt sophomore	Dallas, TX	Transferred to Vermont
Tyrese Hunter	4	G	6'0"	175 lbs	Junior	Racine, WI	Transferred to Memphis

=== Acquisitions ===
==== Incoming transfers ====
Texas incoming transfers
Name	Number	Pos.	Height	Weight	Year	Hometown	Previous School	Source
Arthur Kaluma	6	F	6'7"	225 lbs	Senior	Glendale, AZ	Kansas State	
Jayson Kent	25	PF	6'8"	205 lbs	Senior	Oak Forest, IL	Indiana State	
Jordan Pope	0	G	6'2"	165 lbs	Junior	Napa, CA	Oregon State	
Julian Larry	1	G	6'3"	185 lbs	Senior	Frisco, TX	Indiana State	
Malik Presley	13	G	6'6"	170 lbs	Sophomore	San Marcos, TX	Vanderbilt	
Tramon Mark	12	G	6'6"	185 lbs	Senior	Dickinson, TX	Arkansas	

==== 2024 recruiting class ====
College recruiting information (2024)
Name	Hometown	School	Height	Weight	Commit date
Tre Johnson; SG	Branson, MO	Link Academy	6 ft 6 in (1.98 m)	190 lb (86 kg)	Nov 15, 2023
Tre Johnson; SG	Recruit ratings: Rivals: 247Sports: ESPN: (94)				
Nicolas Codie; PF	Carrollton, TX	Newman Smith	6 ft 9 in (2.06 m)	200 lb (91 kg)	Nov 2, 2023
Nicolas Codie; PF	Recruit ratings: Rivals: 247Sports: ESPN: (85)				
Jamie Vinson; C	Austin, TX	Oak Hill Academy	6 ft 11 in (2.11 m)	210 lb (95 kg)	Jun 3, 2024
Jamie Vinson; C	Recruit ratings: Rivals: 247Sports: ESPN: (79)				
Overall recruit ranking: Rivals: — 247Sports: 10 ESPN: —
Note: In many cases, Scout, Rivals, 247Sports, On3, and ESPN may conflict in their listings of height and weight.; In these cases, the average was taken. ESPN grades are on a 100-point scale.; Sources: "Texas 2024 Basketball Commitments". Rivals.; "2024 Texas Longhorns Recruiting Class". ESPN.; "2024 Team Ranking". Rivals.

== Preseason ==
=== Award watch lists ===
Listed in the order that they were released

Award	Player	Position	Year	Source
Bob Cousy Award	Jordan Pope	G	Junior	
Jerry West Award	Tre Johnson	G	Freshman	
Naismith Trophy	Tre Johnson	G	Freshman	
Julius Erving Award	Arthur Kaluma	F	Senior	

=== SEC media poll ===
SEC media poll
Predicted finish	Team
1	Alabama
2	Auburn
3	Tennessee
4	Arkansas
5	Texas A&M
6	Florida
7	Texas
8	Kentucky
9	Ole Miss
10	Mississippi State
11	South Carolina
12	Georgia
13	Missouri
14	LSU
15	Oklahoma
16	Vanderbilt

=== Preseason All-SEC teams ===
Position	Player	Class
Third Team
G	Tramon Mark	Graduate Student

== Roster ==
2024–25 Texas Longhorns men's basketball team
Players
Coaches

Pos.	#	Name	Height	Weight	Year	Previous school	Hometown
G	0	Jordan Pope	6 ft 2 in (1.88 m)	175 lb (79 kg)	Jr	Prolific Prep; Oregon State	Oakley, CA
G	1	Julian Larry	6 ft 3 in (1.91 m)	185 lb (84 kg)	GS	iSchool Entrepreneurial Academy; Indiana State	Frisco, TX
G	2	Chendall Weaver	6 ft 3 in (1.91 m)	180 lb (82 kg)	So	Mansfield Timberview; UT Arlington	Mansfield, TX
F	4	Jamie Vinson	6 ft 11 in (2.11 m)	225 lb (102 kg)	Fr	Oak Hill Academy	Austin, TX
F	5	Kadin Shedrick	6 ft 11 in (2.11 m)	231 lb (105 kg)	Sr	Holly Springs; Virginia	Holly Springs, NC
F	6	Arthur Kaluma	6 ft 7 in (2.01 m)	225 lb (102 kg)	Sr	Dream City Christian; Kansas State	Glendale, AZ
F	7	Cole Bott (W)	6 ft 6 in (1.98 m)	195 lb (88 kg)	RS So	Northfield Mount Hermon School	Highlands Ranch, CO
F	8	Preston Clark (W)	6 ft 6 in (1.98 m)	210 lb (95 kg)	RS Fr	Westlake	Austin, TX
F	10	Nic Codie	6 ft 8 in (2.03 m)	200 lb (91 kg)	Fr	Newman Smith	Dallas, TX
G	12	Tramon Mark	6 ft 5 in (1.96 m)	190 lb (86 kg)	GS	Dickinson; Arkansas	Dickinson, TX
G/F	13	Malik Presley	6 ft 6 in (1.98 m)	200 lb (91 kg)	So	San Marcos; Vanderbilt	San Marcos, TX
G	20	Tre Johnson	6 ft 6 in (1.98 m)	190 lb (86 kg)	Fr	Link Academy	Garland, TX
F	21	Ze'Rik Onyema	6 ft 8 in (2.03 m)	235 lb (107 kg)	Jr	John Jay; UTEP	El Paso, TX
F	22	Devon Pryor	6 ft 7 in (2.01 m)	180 lb (82 kg)	Fr	PSAT-XEA Academy	Houston, TX
F	25	Jayson Kent	6 ft 8 in (2.03 m)	215 lb (98 kg)	GS	Oak Forest; Indiana State	Oak Forest, IL
G	33	Anthon McDermott (W)	6 ft 5 in (1.96 m)	185 lb (84 kg)	Fr	Hallsville	Longview, TX

Head coach

- Rodney Terry (St. Edward's)

Assistant coach(es)

- Frank Haith (Elon)
- Steve McClain (Chadron State)
- Brandon Chappell (Lamar)
- Byron Jones (Central Oklahoma)
- Nick Matson (VMI)

Legend

- (C) Team captain
- (S) Suspended
- (I) Ineligible
- (W) Walk-on
- Injured
- Current redshirt

Roster
Last update: January 25, 2025

== Schedule and results ==
Date time, TV	Rank^{#}	Opponent^{#}	Result	Record	High points	High rebounds	High assists	Site (attendance) city, state
Non-Conference Regular Season
November 4, 2024*; 9:00 p.m., TNT/TruTV	No. 19	vs. Ohio State; Hall of Fame Series Las Vegas Opening Night	L 72–80	0–1	29 – Johnson	8 – Weaver	5 – Larry	T-Mobile Arena (6,397); Las Vegas, NV
November 8, 2024*; 7:00 p.m., SECN+/ESPN+	No. 19	Houston Christian	W 90–59	1–1	28 – Johnson	10 – Kaluma	3 – Tied	Moody Center (10,993); Austin, TX
November 12, 2024*; 7:00 p.m., SECN+/ESPN+		Chicago State	W 105–58	2–1	19 – Johnson	9 – Weaver	4 – Tied	Moody Center (10,662); Austin, TX
November 16, 2024*; 4:00 p.m., SECN+/ESPN+		Mississippi Valley State	W 89–43	3–1	18 – Tied	7 – Tied	4 – Larry	Moody Center (10,457); Austin, TX
November 21, 2024*; 6:00 p.m., ESPN2		vs. Syracuse; Legends Classic semifinal	W 70–66	4–1	16 – Tied	10 – Kaluma	4 – Tied	Barclays Center (6,941); Brooklyn, NY
November 22, 2024*; 8:30 p.m., ESPNU		vs. Saint Joseph's; Legends Classic championship	W 67–58	5–1	17 – Johnson	7 – Mark	4 – Kaluma	Barclays Center (6,572); Brooklyn, NY
November 29, 2024*; 8:00 p.m., SECN		Delaware State	W 90–68	6–1	21 – Johnson	11 – Shedrick	5 – Larry	Moody Center (10,716); Austin, TX
December 4, 2024*; 8:15 p.m., ESPN2		at NC State; ACC–SEC Challenge	W 63–59	7–1	18 – Johnson	15 – Kaluma	4 – Larry	Lenovo Center (13,396); Raleigh, NC
December 8, 2024*; 4:00 p.m., ESPN		No. 25 UConn	L 65–76	7–2	24 – Johnson	9 – Kaluma	4 – Johnson	Moody Center (11,039); Austin, TX
December 12, 2024*; 7:00 p.m., SECN+/ESPN+		New Mexico State	W 91–67	8–2	18 – Kaluma	7 – Tied	4 – Tied	Moody Center (10,600); Austin, TX
December 15, 2024*; 2:00 p.m., SECN+/ESPN+		Arkansas–Pine Bluff	W 121–57	9–2	20 – Codie	8 – Weaver	13 – Larry	Moody Center (10,514); Austin, TX
December 19, 2024*; 7:00 p.m., SECN+/ESPN+		New Orleans	W 98–62	10–2	42 – Pope	10 – Kaluma	6 – Larry	Moody Center (10,565); Austin, TX
December 29, 2024*; 11:00 a.m., SECN+/ESPN+		Northwestern State	W 77–53	11–2	18 – Johnson	13 – Kaluma	5 – Larry	Moody Center (10,565); Austin, TX
SEC Regular Season
January 4, 2025; 7:00 p.m., SECN		at No. 13 Texas A&M; Lone Star Showdown	L 60–80	11–3 (0–1)	14 – Mark	10 – Shedrick	3 – Larry	Reed Arena (12,236); College Station, TX
January 7, 2025; 8:00 p.m., ESPN2		No. 2 Auburn	L 82–87	11–4 (0–2)	34 – Kaluma	8 – Kaluma	2 – Tied	Moody Center (10,516); Austin, TX
January 11, 2025; 5:00 p.m., ESPN		No. 1 Tennessee	L 70–74	11–5 (0–3)	26 – Johnson	7 – Shedrick	4 – Larry	Moody Center (10,195); Austin, TX
January 15, 2025; 9:00 p.m., SECN		at Oklahoma	W 77–73	12–5 (1–3)	27 – Pope	7 – Shedrick	4 – Kaluma	Lloyd Noble Center (10,436); Norman, OK
January 18, 2025; 3:00 p.m., ESPN2		at No. 5 Florida	L 60–84	12–6 (1–4)	16 – Johnson	10 – Tied	3 – Onyema	O'Connell Center (11,107); Gainesville, FL
January 21, 2025; 8:00 p.m., SECN		No. 22 Missouri	W 61–53	13–6 (2–4)	14 – Kaluma	12 – Kaluma	3 – Larry	Moody Center (11,267); Austin, TX
January 25, 2025; 1:30 p.m., ESPN2		No. 13 Texas A&M; Lone Star Showdown	W 70–69	14–6 (3–4)	30 – Johnson	8 – Shedrick	6 – Larry	Moody Center (11,313); Austin, TX
January 28, 2025; 8:00 p.m., ESPN2		at No. 23 Ole Miss	L 69–72	14–7 (3–5)	22 – Johnson	7 – Kaluma	4 – Kaluma	SJB Pavilion (8,480); Oxford, MS
February 1, 2025; 5:00 p.m., SECN		at LSU	W 89–58	15–7 (4–5)	18 – Tied	10 – Shedrick	5 – Johnson	Pete Maravich Assembly Center (8,395); Baton Rouge, LA
February 5, 2025; 8:00 p.m., ESPN2		Arkansas	L 70–78	15–8 (4–6)	25 – Johnson	13 – Kaluma	4 – Johnson	Moody Center (10,799); Austin, TX
February 8, 2025; 12:00 p.m., SECN		at Vanderbilt	L 78–86	15–9 (4–7)	15 – Johnson	7 – Tied	5 – Johnson	Memorial Gymnasium (9,215); Nashville, TN
February 11, 2025; 8:00 p.m., ESPN		No. 2 Alabama	L 80–103	15–10 (4–8)	24 – Johnson	5 – Shedrick	4 – Johnson	Moody Center (11,091); Austin, TX
February 15, 2025; 7:00 p.m., ESPN		No. 15 Kentucky	W 82–78	16–10 (5–8)	32 – Johnson	9 – Johnson	3 – Tied	Moody Center (11,060); Austin, TX
February 22, 2025; 7:30 p.m., SECN		at South Carolina	L 69–84	16–11 (5–9)	29 – Johnson	9 – Shedrick	5 – Larry	Colonial Life Arena (11,369); Columbia, SC
February 26, 2025; 8:00 p.m., ESPN2		at Arkansas	L 81–86 ^{OT}	16–12 (5–10)	39 – Johnson	11 – Kaluma	5 – Pope	Bud Walton Arena (19,200); Fayetteville, AR
March 1, 2025; 7:00 p.m., ESPN2		Georgia	L 67–83	16–13 (5–11)	15 – Kaluma	7 – Kaluma	4 – Johnson	Moody Center (10,765); Austin, TX
March 4, 2025; 7:00 p.m., SECN		at No. 25 Mississippi State	W 87–82 ^{OT}	17–13 (6–11)	24 – Mark	11 – Kaluma	4 – Johnson	Humphrey Coliseum (9,290); Starkville, MS
March 8, 2025; 7:00 p.m., SECN		Oklahoma	L 72–76	17–14 (6–12)	21 – Pope	9 – Shedrick	6 – Johnson	Moody Center (11,121); Austin, TX
SEC tournament
March 12, 2025; 2:30 p.m., SECN	(13)	vs. (12) Vanderbilt; First round	W 79–72	18–14	19 – Tied	10 – Kent	2 – Tied	Bridgestone Arena (13,840); Nashville, TN
March 13, 2025; 2:30 p.m., SECN	(13)	vs. (5) No. 14 Texas A&M; Second round	W 94–89 ^{2OT}	19–14	20 – Johnson	8 – Pope	5 – Mark	Bridgestone Arena (13,558); Nashville, TN
March 14, 2025; 2:30 p.m., ESPN	(13)	vs. (4) No. 8 Tennessee; Quarterfinals	L 72–83	19–15	14 – Tied	6 – Shedrick	3 – Mark	Bridgestone Arena (17,526); Nashville, TN
NCAA Tournament
March 19, 2025*; 8:10 p.m., truTV	(11 MW)	vs. (11 MW) Xavier; First Four	L 80–86	19–16	23 – Johnson	7 – Shedrick	5 – Mark	UD Arena (12,546); Dayton, OH
*Non-conference game. ^{#}Rankings from AP poll. (#) Tournament seedings in parentheses. MW=Midwest. All times are in Central Time.

== Awards and honors ==
Weekly SEC honors
Honors	Player	Position	Date awarded	Ref.
SEC Men’s Basketball Freshman of the Week	Tre Johnson	G	November 11, 2024	
SEC Men’s Basketball Co-Player of the Week	Jordan Pope	G	December 23, 2024	
SEC Men’s Basketball Freshman of the Week	Tre Johnson	G	January 27, 2025	
SEC Men’s Basketball Freshman of the Week	Tre Johnson	G	February 3, 2025	
SEC Men’s Basketball Freshman of the Week	Tre Johnson	G	February 17, 2025	
SEC Men’s Basketball Freshman of the Week	Tre Johnson	G	March 3, 2025	

Conference honors
Honors	Player	Position
All-SEC Second Team	Tre Johnson	G
All-SEC Freshman Team	Tre Johnson	G
SEC Freshman of the Year	Tre Johnson	G

== Rankings ==
Ranking movements Legend: ██ Increase in ranking ██ Decrease in ranking — = Not ranked RV = Received votes
	Week																				
Poll	Pre	1	2	3	4	5	6	7	8	9	10	11	12	13	14	15	16	17	18	19	Final
AP	19	RV	RV	RV	RV	RV	RV	—	—	—	—	—	RV	RV	—	—	—	—	—	—	—
Coaches	19	RV	RV	RV	RV	RV	—	—	—	—	—	—	—	—	—	—	—	—	—	—	—
