= Felix Okpara =

Nigerian basketball player (born 2004)

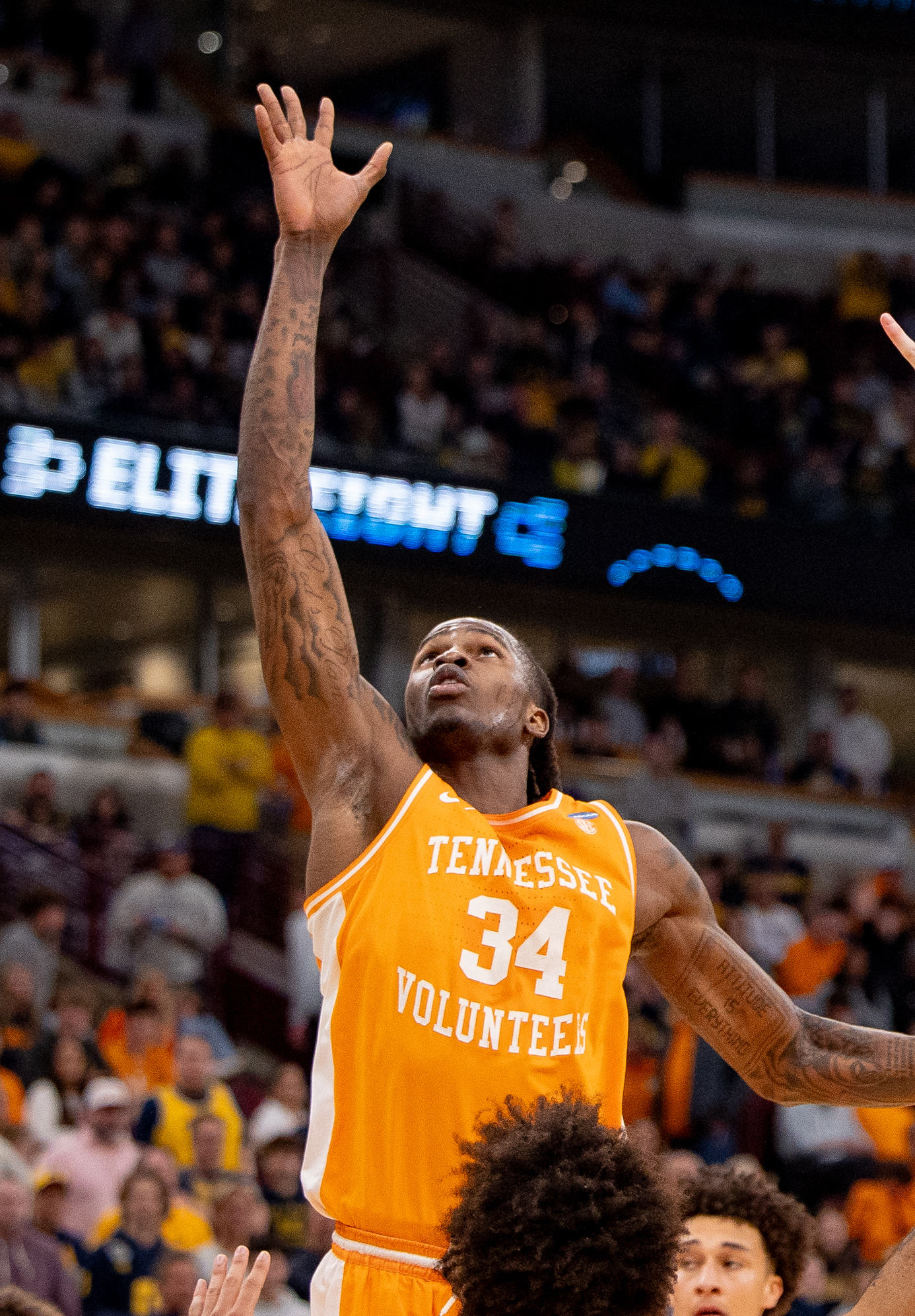
- Okpara with the Tennessee Volunteers in 2026

No. 34 – Washington Wizards
- Position: Center
- League: NBA

Personal information
- Born: April 20, 2004 (age 22) Lagos, Nigeria
- Listed height: 6 ft 11 in (2.11 m)
- Listed weight: 235 lb (107 kg)

Career information
- High school: Hamilton Heights Christian Academy (Chattanooga, Tennessee); Link Academy (Branson, Missouri)
- College: Ohio State (2022–2024); Tennessee (2024–2026)
- NBA draft: 2026: 2nd round, 46th overall pick
- Drafted by: Orlando Magic
- Playing career: 2026–present

Career history
- 2026–present: Washington Wizards
- 2026–present: →Capital City Go-Go

Career highlights
- SEC All-Defensive Team (2026)
- Stats at NBA.com
- Stats at Basketball Reference

Felix Eberechukwu Okpara (born April 20, 2004) is a Nigerian professional basketball player for the Washington Wizards of the National Basketball Association (NBA), on a two-way contract with the Capital City Go-Go of the NBA G League. He played college basketball for the Ohio State Buckeyes and Tennessee Volunteers.

== Early life ==
Okpara was born in Lagos, Nigeria, where he played soccer during his early years as a central and defensive midfielder. At the age of 14, Okpara moved to the United States to pursue a basketball career, having never played basketball before. He initially attended Hamilton Heights Christian Academy, where he averaged 11.9 points, 7.9 rebounds, and 2.6 blocks per game, and also blocked double-digit shots in two games; one game being the St. James NIBC Invitational against Oak Hill Academy where he blocked 12 shots. As a reserve his senior year, he averaged 8 points, 6 rebounds, and 2 blocks per game, helping his team reach the GEICO Nationals where he had 4 points, 4 rebounds, and 4 blocks in their loss to Montverde Academy. He received offers from Florida, Georgia, Illinois, Mississippi State, Nebraska, Ohio State, Oklahoma, Oklahoma State, Ole Miss, San Diego, Tennessee, Texas, and Vanderbilt, before committing to play at Ohio State on July 26, 2021.

=== Recruiting ===
Okpara was ranked the 74th best player in the nation, the 15th best center in the nation, and the 4th best player in the state of Missouri in the class of 2022.

College recruiting
Name	Hometown	School	Height	Weight	Commit date
Felix Okpara; C	Lagos, Nigeria	Link Academy (MO)	6 ft 10 in (2.08 m)	210 lb (95 kg)	Jul 26, 2021
Felix Okpara; C	Recruit ratings: Rivals: 247Sports: On3: ESPN: (85)				
Overall recruit ranking: 247Sports: 8
Note: In many cases, Scout, Rivals, 247Sports, On3, and ESPN may conflict in their listings of height and weight.; In these cases, the average was taken. ESPN grades are on a 100-point scale.; Sources: "Ohio State 2022 Basketball Commitments". Rivals.; "2022 Ohio State Buckeyes Recruiting Class". ESPN.; "2022 Team Ranking". Rivals.

== College career ==
=== Ohio State ===
In the Buckeyes' 96–59 win over Saint Francis on December 3, 2022, Okpara achieved his first career double-double, and also hit his first career three. Okpara, who had been dealing with an injury, played 8 minutes in the team's 72–60 win over Illinois on February 26, 2023. In the final 9 games of the season, Okpara averaged 5.8 points and 4.4 rebounds per game, along with shooting a solid 63.2% from the floor after starting center Zed Key was ruled out for the rest of the season. On March 1, Okpara had his best game of the season, tallying 12 points, 12 rebounds, and 3 blocks in a 73–62 upset win over No. 21 Maryland. In the quarterfinals of the Big Ten tournament, Okpara notched 8 points, 8 rebounds, and 5 blocks in the 68–58 win over Michigan State.

On November 29, 2023, in the 88–61 win against Central Michigan, Okpara notched a career-high 14 points. After the season, Okpara announced his return to the Buckeyes. However, on April 21, 2024, Okpara decided to enter the transfer portal.

=== Tennessee ===
On April 25, 2024, Okpara transferred to Tennessee. He posted 7.1 points and 6.4 rebounds per game during his first season and junior season at Tennessee in 2024–25. Okpara averaged 8.0 points, 6.3 rebounds and 1.5 blocks per game in his final and senior season in 2025–26.

== Professional career ==
On June 24, 2026, Okpara was drafted by the Orlando Magic with the 46th overall pick in the 2026 NBA draft then immediately traded to the Washington Wizards.

== Career statistics ==
Legend
GP	Games played	GS	Games started	MPG	Minutes per game
FG%	Field goal percentage	3P%	3-point field goal percentage	FT%	Free throw percentage
RPG	Rebounds per game	APG	Assists per game	SPG	Steals per game
BPG	Blocks per game	PPG	Points per game	**Bold**	Career high

=== College ===
Year	Team	GP	GS	MPG	FG%	3P%	FT%	RPG	APG	SPG	BPG	PPG
2022–23	Ohio State	35	11	15.5	.587	.200	.615	3.6	0.3	0.4	1.3	4.0
2023–24	Ohio State	35	34	23.5	.586	.000	.589	6.4	0.5	0.4	2.4	6.6
2024–25	Tennessee	38	38	25.8	.589	1.000	.719	6.4	0.3	0.2	1.7	7.1
2025–26	Tennessee	35	34	26.9	.597	.364	.635	6.3	0.5	0.4	1.5	8.0
**Career**		143	117	23.0	.590	.261	.645	5.7	0.4	0.4	1.7	6.4
