= Chaz Lanier =

American basketball player (born 2001)

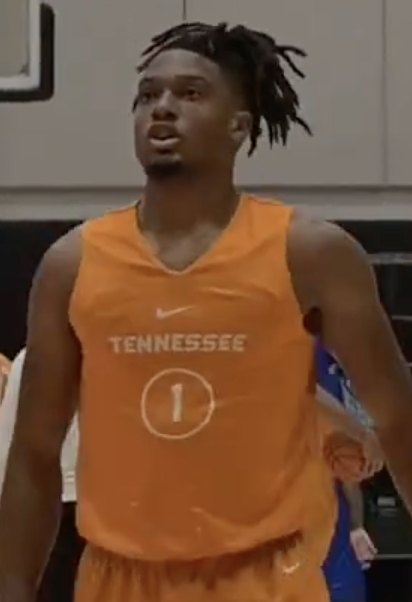
- Lanier with Tennessee in 2024

No. 8 – Detroit Pistons
- Position: Shooting guard
- League: NBA

Personal information
- Born: December 19, 2001 (age 24) Nashville, Tennessee, U.S.
- Listed height: 6 ft 4 in (1.93 m)
- Listed weight: 206 lb (93 kg)

Career information
- High school: The Ensworth School (Nashville, Tennessee)
- College: North Florida (2020–2024); Tennessee (2024–2025)
- NBA draft: 2025: 2nd round, 37th overall pick
- Drafted by: Detroit Pistons
- Playing career: 2025–present

Career history
- 2025–present: Detroit Pistons
- 2025–2026: →Motor City Cruise

Career highlights
- Third-team All-American – NABC, SN (2025); Jerry West Award (2025); SEC Newcomer of the Year (2025); First-team All-SEC (2025); First-team All-ASUN (2024)
- Stats at NBA.com
- Stats at Basketball Reference

Chaz Harrison Lanier (born December 19, 2001) is an American professional basketball player for the Detroit Pistons of the National Basketball Association (NBA). He played college basketball for the North Florida Ospreys and the Tennessee Volunteers. He was selected by the Pistons with the 37th overall pick in the second round of the 2025 NBA Draft.

== High school career ==
Lanier attended The Ensworth School in Nashville, Tennessee. As a freshman in high school, Lanier stood at five feet and six inches; then as a sophomore, he grew to five feet and nine inches. Throughout his junior and senior year, his growth spurt would continue until he was over six feet tall.

== College career ==
At the conclusion of his high school career, he committed to the University of North Florida to play for North Florida Ospreys. In his first three seasons, he played primarily in a backup role. As a senior during the 2023–24 season, he averaged 19.7 points per game and was named to the first team All-ASUN. At the conclusion of the season, Lanier entered the transfer portal. On May 24, 2024, he transferred to the University of Tennessee to play for the Tennessee Volunteers. With Tennessee, he emerged as the team's leading scorer. In his first game with Tennessee, Lanier scored a team high 18 points, leading the Volunteers to an 80–64 win over Gardner–Webb. Against Miami in the Jimmy V Classic, he led the Volunteers in scoring with 22 points, in a 75–62 victory.

== Professional career ==
On the second night of the 2025 NBA draft, Lanier was selected in the second round with the 37th pick by the Detroit Pistons. He later signed a four-year $8.79 million contract with the team. On October 24, Lanier made his NBA debut with the team, playing 11 minutes. In those minutes, Lanier grabbed one rebound and scored three points in a 115–111 win against the Houston Rockets. On November 18, Lanier scored a career high in points, scoring nine points, and grabbing two rebound in 11 minutes of play in a 120–112 win against the Atlanta Hawks. On December 7, Lanier was later assigned to the Motor City Cruise of the NBA G League. On December 10, Lanier scored a career high with the NBA-League team, scoring 40 points in 38 minutes of play.

== Career statistics ==
Legend
GP	Games played	GS	Games started	MPG	Minutes per game
FG%	Field goal percentage	3P%	3-point field goal percentage	FT%	Free throw percentage
RPG	Rebounds per game	APG	Assists per game	SPG	Steals per game
BPG	Blocks per game	PPG	Points per game	**Bold**	Career high

=== NBA ===
==== Regular season ====
Year	Team	GP	GS	MPG	FG%	3P%	FT%	RPG	APG	SPG	BPG	PPG
2025–26	Detroit	34	0	7.7	.315	.284	.833	.7	.5	.2	.0	2.4
Career		34	0	7.7	.315	.284	.833	.7	.5	.2	.0	2.4

==== Playoffs ====
Year	Team	GP	GS	MPG	FG%	3P%	FT%	RPG	APG	SPG	BPG	PPG
2026	Detroit	3	0	2.7	.333	.000	—	.0	.3	.0	.0	.7
Career		3	0	2.7	.333	.000	—	.0	.3	.0	.0	.7

=== College ===
Year	Team	GP	GS	MPG	FG%	3P%	FT%	RPG	APG	SPG	BPG	PPG
2020–21	North Florida	10	1	9.3	.375	.300	.667	.7	.6	.3	.0	1.7
2021–22	North Florida	31	8	21.0	.415	.304	.805	2.7	1.1	.7	.2	4.5
2022–23	North Florida	31	9	19.7	.454	.391	**1.000**	2.5	.9	.4	.2	4.7
2023–24	North Florida	32	31	**33.4**	**.510**	**.440**	.880	**4.8**	**1.8**	**.9**	**.3**	**19.7**
2024–25	Tennessee	**38**	**38**	31.4	.431	.395	.758	3.9	1.1	**.9**	.1	18.0
Career		142	87	25.5	.458	.402	.824	3.3	1.2	.7	.2	11.4

== Personal life ==
Lanier's parents are Thomas and Stacey Lanier. Both his parents played collegiate basketball, with his dad playing at Lipscomb University, and his mom playing at Alcorn State University. Lanier also has a brother named Trey.
