= Camden Heide =

American basketball player (born 2003)

- Heide with Purdue in 2023

No. 23 – South Carolina Gamecocks
- Position: Small forward
- Conference: Southeastern Conference

Personal information
- Born: July 16, 2003 (age 23) Littleton, Colorado, U.S.
- Listed height: 6 ft 7 in (2.01 m)
- Listed weight: 215 lb (98 kg)

Career information
- High school: Wayzata (Plymouth, Minnesota); Wasatch Academy (Mount Pleasant, Utah)
- College: Purdue (2023–2025); Texas (2025–2026); South Carolina (2026–present)

Camden Craig Heide (born July 16, 2003) is an American college basketball player for the South Carolina Gamecocks of the Southeastern Conference (SEC). He previously played for the Purdue Boilermakers and Texas Longhorns. A consensus four-star recruit from Wayzata, Minnesota, Heide was a member of Purdue's 2024 national runner-up and 2025 Sweet 16 teams. He helped Texas reach the NCAA Sweet 16 in 2026.

== Early life and high school career ==
Heide was born in Littleton, Colorado but spent his childhood in Wayzata, Minnesota. He grew up playing basketball, football, and baseball. He spent four years at Wayzata High School in Plymouth, Minnesota, where he became the first eighth-grader in school history to play varsity basketball.

In 2021, as a junior, Heide led Wayzata to its first Minnesota State High School Championship since 1959, held at Target Center. He contributed 17 points and 10 rebounds in the 75–61 championship victory over Cretin-Derham Hall. During his junior season, he averaged 17.9 points per game while shooting 57 percent from the field.

Heide reached his 1,000th career point on February 12, 2021, in a victory against Hopkins High School, finishing his Wayzata career with 1,189 points. He averaged 15.2 points per game as a sophomore and 13.5 as a freshman, playing AAU basketball for D1 Minnesota.

For his senior year, Heide transferred to Wasatch Academy in Utah, though he played in only seven games before sustaining a broken foot.

=== National team experience ===
In May 2019, Heide was named one of 18 finalists to USA Basketball's U16 National Team and attended the Men's Junior National Team minicamp in July 2019.

=== Recruiting ===
Heide was ranked as the top player in Minnesota from the class of 2022 and 13th at his position nationally by 247Sports. He received 11 scholarship offers, including from Minnesota, Iowa, Arizona, Texas, Wisconsin, Virginia Tech, and Creighton. On June 15, 2021, Heide committed to Purdue, becoming the third member of the Boilermakers' 2022 recruiting class alongside Fletcher Loyer and Braden Smith.

== College career ==
=== Purdue Boilermakers (2023–2025) ===
==== 2022–23 season (Redshirt) ====
Heide redshirted the 2022–23 season following foot surgery during his senior high school season.

==== 2023–24 season ====
Heide made his collegiate debut on November 13, 2023, against Samford, scoring 13 points in 17 minutes along with three rebounds, two blocks, and two steals. As a redshirt freshman, he appeared in all 39 games, averaging 3.3 points and 1.9 rebounds per game while shooting 58 percent from the field and 45 percent from three-point range. Heide became one of only two college players to shoot 65 percent or better from 2-point range and 45 percent or better from 3-point range with a minimum of 40 attempts, leading all Power 5 freshmen in effective field goal percentage at 68.2 percent. He scored a season-high 18 points on perfect 7-of-7 shooting against Rutgers on February 22, 2024. Heide helped Purdue reach the NCAA Tournament as a No. 1 seed and advance to their first Final Four since 1980 and first national championship game since 1969. His most memorable moment came in the National Championship game against UConn, where he delivered a ferocious putback dunk that became ESPN SportsCenter's No. 1 play.

==== 2024–25 season ====
In his sophomore season, Heide played an expanded role, appearing in all 36 games with eight starts. He averaged 4.7 points, 3.6 rebounds, and 0.4 assists in 19.6 minutes per game, shooting 49.1 percent from the field and 39.2 percent from 3-point range. Heide scored a season-high 15 points against both North Carolina State and Maryland, making his first career start against Marshall on November 23 with 13 points on perfect 3-of-3 shooting. He recorded his first career double-double in the NCAA Tournament first round against High Point with 11 points and 10 rebounds. His best stretch came during the final portion of the season and NCAA Tournament, where he shot 60% from three-point range over the final 11 games. In the Sweet 16 against Houston, he hit a crucial game-tying 3-pointer with 32 seconds remaining, finishing with nine points.

Heide finished his Purdue career shooting 49-of-119 (.412) from three-point range and 103-of-195 (.528) from the field. Over his two active seasons, he averaged 3.9 points and 2.7 rebounds per game.

=== Texas Longhorns (2025–2026) ===
==== 2025–26 season ====
Heide entered the transfer portal shortly after the conclusion of the 2024–25 season. He committed to Texas to play for new head coach Sean Miller, with two years of eligibility remaining. Upon announcing his transfer, Heide shared a message on social media stating: "Forever grateful for my time at Purdue! I'm extremely blessed for all the memories, relationships and experiences I've had. Excited for the next chapter. Thank you, Boiler Nation!"

Heide began wearing jersey No. 5 at Texas after wearing No. 23 for three seasons at Purdue.

In the first game of the season against Duke, Heide made his Texas debut, recording two rebounds in nine minutes of play.On November 18, he made his first start against Rider, recording a career-high 20 points on 6-of-9 shooting from three-point range and five rebounds. On January 28, 2026 against Auburn, Heide scored 17 points, including making 5-of-6 from three-point range. He followed with a 13-point game on 5-of-6 shooting at Oklahoma on January 31. He played in his 100th collegiate game on February 17 against LSU.

In the NCAA Tournament Second Round, Heide hit a game-clinching corner three-pointer with 14.7 seconds to defeat third-seeded Gonzaga and send Texas to the Sweet 16 and a matchup with his former school, Purdue. Leading up to the matchup with his former teammates, Heide remarked about his appreciation for Purdue and Texas fans and about the achievements of his former teammates.

Heide finished the season averaging 5.9 points and 2.7 rebounds per game. He shot 45.3 percent from three-point range. He started in 29 of 35 games played.

On April 9, 2026, Heide announced that he was entering the transfer portal.

=== South Carolina (2026–present) ===
==== 2026–27 season ====
On April 15, Heide committed to South Carolina and returned to wearing jersey number 23. In his first game with the Gamecocks on November 3 against Stetson, Heide scored 13 points on 5-of-9 shooting to go with two blocks, two steals, and two rebounds. His fastbreak slam dunk was featured in ESPN Sportscenter's top 10 plays of the day.

== Playing style ==
Heide is known for his athleticism and versatility as a forward. Scouting reports describe him as "a quality shooter off catch or dribble" who "can make shots off either foot in the mid-range when attacking" and "has post up game". He is noted as "a straight ahead athlete who jumps best off one foot when attacking the rim" and "uses his body well on offense".

Heide is particularly known for his highlight-reel dunks, with his putback slam in the 2024 National Championship game becoming one of the most memorable plays of March Madness.

== Career highlights and achievements ==
- Minnesota Class 4A state champion with Wayzata (2021)
- First eighth-grader in Wayzata High School history to play varsity basketball
- 1,189 career points at Wayzata High School
- Consensus four-star recruit, No. 1 player in Minnesota class of 2022
- USA Basketball U16 National Team finalist (2019)
- ESPN SportsCenter Top 10 No. 1 play for National Championship dunk (2024)
- Led all Power 5 freshmen in effective field goal percentage (68.2%) in 2023-24
- Purdue Final Four participant (2024) and Sweet 16 participant (2025)
- Game-tying 3-pointer in NCAA Tournament Sweet 16 vs. Houston (2025)
- Texas Sweet 16 participant (2026)
- Game-clinching 3-pointer in NCAA Tournament Second Round vs. Gonzaga (2026)

== Career statistics ==
Legend
GP	Games played	GS	Games started	MPG	Minutes per game
FG%	Field goal percentage	3P%	3-point field goal percentage	FT%	Free throw percentage
RPG	Rebounds per game	APG	Assists per game	SPG	Steals per game
BPG	Blocks per game	PPG	Points per game	**Bold**	Career high

=== College ===
Year	Team	GP	GS	MPG	FG%	3P%	FT%	RPG	APG	BPG	SPG	PTS	PPG
2022–23	Purdue	Redshirt											
2023–24	Purdue	39	0	12.4	57.6	45.0	73.3	1.9	0.4	0.2	0.2	127	3.3
2024–25	Purdue	36	8	19.6	49.1	39.2	80.6	3.6	0.4	0.2	0.4	168	4.7
2025–26	Texas	35	29	22.5	49.3	45.4	70.6	2.7	0.7	0.1	0.4	205	5.9
2026–27	South Carolina	4	3	28.8	42.9	36.4	78.6	3.8	0.0	0.8	1.0	33	8.3
Career		114	40	18.3	51.0	43.2	76.8	2.8	0.5	0.2	0.4	531	4.6

== Personal life ==
Heide is the son of Craig and Kelly Heide. His father Craig is a 1979 graduate of Lafayette Jeff High School and a 1984 Purdue graduate, creating a family connection to the Boilermakers program. Craig and his siblings Jeff and Ashlyn are Lafayette, Indiana natives who attended Purdue University.

His brother Keaton Heide was a four-year letterwinner at quarterback for South Dakota State from 2019-22, appearing in two FCS National Championship games and winning a national championship in 2022. Keaton completed 113-171 passes for 1,401 yards and nine touchdowns in his college career. The brothers were high school basketball teammates in 2017-18 and 2018-19.

At Purdue, Heide majored in organizational leadership and maintained a 3.56 cumulative GPA.
