= Jake Wilkins =

American basketball player (born 2006)

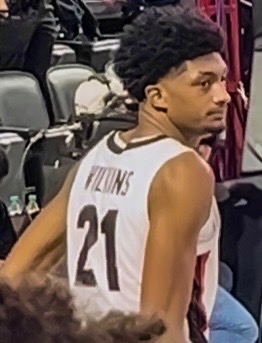
- Wilkins in 2025

No. 21 – California Golden Bears
- Position: Small forward
- Conference: Atlantic Coast Conference

Personal information
- Born: August 30, 2006 (age 20)
- Listed height: 6 ft 9 in (2.06 m)
- Listed weight: 190 lb (86 kg)

Career information
- High school: Grayson (Loganville, Georgia)
- College: Georgia (2025–2026); California (2026–present)

Jacob Wilkins (born August 30, 2006) is American college basketball player for the California Golden Bears of the Atlantic Coast Conference (ACC). He previously played for the Georgia Bulldogs. Nicknamed "Baby Highlight", he is the son of NBA Hall of Famer Dominique Wilkins.

== Early life ==
Wilkins attended Grayson High School in Loganville, Georgia. As a junior, he helped lead the Rams to a state championship title, the first in school history. While playing for the Georgia Stars on Nike’s EYBL E16 Circuit, Wilkins averaged 9.3 points, 5.4 rebounds, and 1.0 blocks per game. A four-star recruit, he committed to play college basketball at the University of Georgia, his father's alma mater, over an offer from Virginia.

== College career ==
Prior to the beginning of his freshman season, it was announced that Wilkins would be allowed to wear his father’s number, 21, which had been retired by Georgia in 1991. In his collegiate debut, he scored 12 points in a 104–59 rout of Bellarmine. Wilkins finished his freshman season appearing in 32 games, averaging 4.9 points and 1.8 rebounds per game. Following the conclusion of the season, he entered the transfer portal.

On April 11, 2026, Wilkins announced his decision to transfer to the University of California, Berkeley, to play for the California Golden Bears.

== Career statistics ==
Legend
GP	Games played	GS	Games started	MPG	Minutes per game
FG%	Field goal percentage	3P%	3-point field goal percentage	FT%	Free throw percentage
RPG	Rebounds per game	APG	Assists per game	SPG	Steals per game
BPG	Blocks per game	PPG	Points per game	**Bold**	Career high

=== College ===
Year	Team	GP	GS	MPG	FG%	3P%	FT%	RPG	APG	SPG	BPG	PPG
2025–26	Georgia	32	0	10.2	.466	.211	.776	1.8	.4	.6	.4	4.9
