= Jordan Pope =

American basketball player (born 2003)

No. 0 – Texas A&M Aggies
- Position: Point guard

Personal information
- Born: June 6, 2003 (age 23) Oakland, California, U.S.
- Listed height: 6 ft 1 in (1.85 m)
- Listed weight: 180 lb (82 kg)

Career information
- High school: Prolific Prep (Napa, California)
- College: Oregon State (2022–2024); Texas (2024–2026); Texas A&M (2026–present)

Career highlights
- Pac-12 All-Freshman Team (2023)

Jordan Pope (born June 6, 2003) is an American college basketball player for the Texas A&M Aggies. He previously played for the Oregon State Beavers and Texas Longhorns.

== Early life and high school ==
Coming out of high school, Pope committed to play college basketball for the Oregon State Beavers over other schools such as Nevada, Wichita State, New Mexico, Montana and San Francisco.

== College career ==
=== Oregon State ===
On November 27, 2022, Pope notched 23 points versus Portland State. As a freshman in 2022-23, he averaged 12.6 points per game and was named to the Pac-12 Conference All-Freshman team. On December 21, 2023, Pope put up 25 points in a victory versus Idaho State. On January 26, 2024, he dropped 31 points including the game-winning three in an upset victory over Arizona. During the 2023-24 season, Pope averaged 17.7 points, 3.4 assists and 2.6 rebounds per game and earned all-conference honorable mention. After the season, he entered his name into the NCAA transfer portal.

=== Texas ===
Pope transferred to play for the Texas Longhorns. On November 4, 2024, he made his Texas debut, where he recorded five points, two rebounds, and two assists in a loss to Ohio State. On December 19, 2024, Pope scored a career-high 42 points with eight threes in a win over New Orleans. On January 15, 2025, he recorded 27 points and four steals in a victory over Oklahoma.

=== Texas A&M ===
After a court ruling allowed Pope a final year of eligibility, he transferred to play for the Texas A&M Aggies, as Texas had already finalized their roster before the eligibility ruling was complete.

== Career statistics ==
Legend
GP	Games played	GS	Games started	MPG	Minutes per game
FG%	Field goal percentage	3P%	3-point field goal percentage	FT%	Free throw percentage
RPG	Rebounds per game	APG	Assists per game	SPG	Steals per game
BPG	Blocks per game	PPG	Points per game	**Bold**	Career high

=== College ===
Year	Team	GP	GS	MPG	FG%	3P%	FT%	RPG	APG	SPG	BPG	PPG
2022–23	Oregon State	32	31	33.5	.423	**.377**	.836	**2.6**	2.3	0.9	**0.1**	12.6
2023–24	Oregon State	32	32	**35.6**	**.451**	.371	**.879**	**2.6**	**3.4**	0.7	**0.1**	**17.6**
2024–25	Texas	35	32	25.5	.435	.364	.875	2.0	1.7	**1.0**	0.0	11.0
2025–26	Texas	**36**	**35**	29.1	.399	.372	.840	2.1	1.9	0.4	**0.1**	13.1
Career		135	130	30.7	.428	.371	.858	2.3	2.3	0.7	0.1	13.5
