= 2025–26 Georgia Bulldogs basketball team =

American college basketball season

2025–26 Georgia Bulldogs basketball

NCAA tournament, First round
- Conference: Southeastern Conference
- Record: 22–11 (10–8 SEC)
- Head coach: Mike White (4th season)
- Associate head coach: Antonio Reynolds-Dean (4th season)
- Assistant coaches: Todd Abernethy (1st season); Anthony Goins (2nd season); Patrick Blake (3rd season); Darryl Hardin (2nd season)
- Home arena: Stegeman Coliseum

2025–26 Southeastern Conference men's basketball standings
	Conf.				Overall
Team	W		L	PCT	W		L	PCT
No. 9 Florida	16	–	2	.889	27	–	8	.771
No. 16 Alabama	13	–	5	.722	25	–	10	.714
No. 13 Arkansas †	13	–	5	.722	28	–	9	.757
No. 19 Vanderbilt	11	–	7	.611	27	–	9	.750
No. 12 Tennessee	11	–	7	.611	25	–	12	.676
Texas A&M	11	–	7	.611	22	–	12	.647
Georgia	10	–	8	.556	22	–	11	.667
Missouri	10	–	8	.556	20	–	13	.606
Kentucky	10	–	8	.556	22	–	14	.611
No. 22 Texas	9	–	9	.500	21	–	15	.583
Oklahoma	7	–	11	.389	21	–	16	.568
Auburn	7	–	11	.389	22	–	16	.579
Mississippi State	5	–	13	.278	13	–	19	.406
South Carolina	4	–	14	.222	13	–	19	.406
Ole Miss	4	–	14	.222	15	–	20	.429
LSU	3	–	15	.167	15	–	17	.469
† 2026 SEC tournament winner Rankings from AP poll

The 2025–26 Georgia Bulldogs basketball team represented the University of Georgia during the 2025–26 NCAA Division I men's basketball season. They were led by fourth-year head coach Mike White and played their home games at the Stegeman Coliseum in Athens, Georgia, as members of the Southeastern Conference. They finished the season 22–11, 10–8 in SEC play to finish in a tie for seventh place. They lost in the second round of the SEC tournament to Ole Miss. The Bulldogs received an at-large bid to the NCAA tournament, marking their second consecutive tournament appearance. Seeded No. 8 in the Midwest region, they lost to Saint Louis in the first round in a 102–77 drubbing.

== Previous season ==
The Bulldogs finished the 2024–25 season 20–13, 8–10 in SEC play to finish in a tie for eighth place. As the No. 11 seed in the SEC tournament, they were defeated by Oklahoma in the first round. The Bulldogs received an at-large bid to the NCAA tournament, where they lost to Gonzaga in the first round. This was their first NCAA tournament appearance since the 2014–15 season.

== Offseason ==
=== Departures ===
Georgia departures
Name	Number	Pos.	Height	Weight	Year	Hometown	Reason for departure
Dakota Leffew	1	G	6'5"	195	GS senior	Hampton, Georgia	Graduated
De'Shayne Montgomery	2	G	6'5"	190	Sophomore	Fort Lauderdale, Florida	Transferred to Dayton
Savo Drezgić	3	G	6'4"	190	Freshman	Belgrade, Serbia	Left for KK Mega Basket
Jordyn Kee	4	G	6'3"	185	Freshman	Broward County, Florida	Transferred to Miami
Silas Demary Jr.	5	G	6'5"	195	Sophomore	Raleigh, North Carolina	Transferred to UConn
Tyrin Lawrence	7	G	6'4"	200	GS senior	Monticello, Georgia	Graduated
RJ Godfrey	10	F	6'8"	230	Junior	Suwanee, Georgia	Transferred to Clemson
Asa Newell	14	F	6'11"	220	Freshman	Destin, Florida	Declared for 2025 NBA draft, selected 23rd overall by the New Orleans Pelicans, traded to the Atlanta Hawks

=== Incoming transfers ===
Georgia incoming transfers
Name	Number	Pos.	Height	Weight	Year	Hometown	Previous school
Jordan Ross	3	G	6'3"	195	Junior	Pleasant Grove, Utah	Saint Mary's
Marcus Millender	4	G	5'11"	175	Junior	Houston, Texas	UTSA
Jeremiah Wilkinson	5	G	6'1"	185	Sophomore	Powder Springs, Georgia	California
Kanon Catchings	6	F	6'9"	220	Sophomore	Brownsburg, Indiana	BYU
Justin Bailey	7	G	6'3"	195	Senior	Greer, South Carolina	Wofford

=== Recruiting class ===
==== 2025 recruiting class ====
College recruiting
Name	Hometown	School	Height	Weight	Commit date
Jake Wilkins; SF	Lilburn, Georgia	Grayson High School	6 ft 7 in (2.01 m)	167 lb (76 kg)	Oct 31, 2023
Jake Wilkins; SF	Recruit ratings: Rivals: 247Sports: ESPN: (85)				
Kareem Stagg; C	Chesapeake, Virginia	IMG Academy	6 ft 8 in (2.03 m)	220 lb (100 kg)	Oct 8, 2024
Kareem Stagg; C	Recruit ratings: Rivals: 247Sports: ESPN: (82)				
Jackson McVey; C	Ellijay, Georgia	DME Academy	7 ft 1 in (2.16 m)	225 lb (102 kg)	Oct 22, 2024
Jackson McVey; C	Recruit ratings: Rivals: 247Sports: ESPN: (80)				
Overall recruit ranking: Rivals: 24 247Sports: 31 ESPN: —
Note: In many cases, Scout, Rivals, 247Sports, On3, and ESPN may conflict in their listings of height and weight.; In these cases, the average was taken. ESPN grades are on a 100-point scale.; Sources: "Georgia 2025 Basketball Commitments". Rivals.; "2025 Georgia Bulldogs Recruiting Class". ESPN.; "2025 Team Ranking". Rivals.

== Roster ==
2025–26 Georgia Bulldogs men's basketball team
Players
Coaches

Pos.	#	Name	Height	Weight	Year	Previous school	Hometown
G	0	Blue Cain	6 ft 5 in (1.96 m)	195 lb (88 kg)	Jr	IMG Academy	Knoxville, TN
F	1	Kareem Stagg	6 ft 8 in (2.03 m)	230 lb (104 kg)	Fr	IMG Academy	Chesapeake, VA
C	2	Somto Cyril	6 ft 11 in (2.11 m)	260 lb (118 kg)	So	Overtime Elite	Enugu, Nigeria
G	3	Jordan Ross	6 ft 3 in (1.91 m)	195 lb (88 kg)	Jr	AZ Compass Prep; Saint Mary's	Pleasant Grove, UT
G	4	Marcus Millender	5 ft 11 in (1.8 m)	175 lb (79 kg)	Jr	Clear Brook; UTSA	Houston, TX
G	5	Jeremiah Wilkinson	6 ft 1 in (1.85 m)	185 lb (84 kg)	So	The Skill Factory; California	Powder Springs, GA
F	6	Kanon Catchings	6 ft 9 in (2.06 m)	220 lb (100 kg)	So	Overtime Elite; BYU	Brownsburg, IN
G	7	Justin Bailey	6 ft 3 in (1.91 m)	195 lb (88 kg)	Sr	Blue Ridge; Wofford	Greer, SC
F	11	Dylan James	6 ft 9 in (2.06 m)	215 lb (98 kg)	Jr	Winter Haven HS	Winter Haven, FL
G	12	Markel Jennings	5 ft 11 in (1.8 m)	165 lb (75 kg)	RS So	Athens Academy	Watkinsville, GA
F	21	Jake Wilkins	6 ft 9 in (2.06 m)	185 lb (84 kg)	Fr	Grayson	Lilburn, Georgia
C	22	Jackson McVey	7 ft 1 in (2.16 m)	240 lb (109 kg)	Fr	Overtime Elite	Ellijay, GA
F	24	Jaden Newell	6 ft 8 in (2.03 m)	225 lb (102 kg)	RS Jr	Choctawhatchee HS; Iona	Destin, FL
F	25	Justin Abson	6 ft 9 in (2.06 m)	250 lb (113 kg)	Sr	North Broward Prep; Appalachian State	Pompano Beach, FL
G	30	Brandon Klatsky	6 ft 4 in (1.93 m)	175 lb (79 kg)	RS Jr	Ranney School	Colts Neck, NJ

Head coach

- Mike White (Ole Miss)

Assistant coach(es)

- Antonio Reynolds Dean (Rhode Island)
- Anthony Goins (St. John's)
- Todd Abernethy (Mississippi)
- Patrick Blake (Mississippi)
- Darryl Hardin (Florida State)

Legend

- (C) Team captain
- (S) Suspended
- (I) Ineligible
- (W) Walk-on
- Injured
- Current redshirt

Roster

== Schedule and results ==
Date time, TV	Rank^{#}	Opponent^{#}	Result	Record	High points	High rebounds	High assists	Site (attendance) city, state
Exhibition
October 15, 2025*; 7:00 p.m.		at Georgia State; CareSource Invitational	W 65–61	–	17 – Wilkinson	9 – Catchings	4 – Millender	Georgia State Convocation Center; Atlanta, GA
October 26, 2025*; 2:00 p.m.		Troy	W 81–65	–	15 – Catchings	8 – Catchings	6 – Millender	Stegeman Coliseum (5,715); Athens, GA
Non-conference regular season
November 3, 2025*; 7:30 p.m., SECN+/ESPN+		Bellarmine	W 104–59	1–0	15 – Tied	6 – Tied	3 – Tied	Stegeman Coliseum (6,187); Athens, GA
November 5, 2025*; 7:00 p.m., SECN+/ESPN+		Maryland Eastern Shore	W 94–29	2–0	16 – Tied	9 – Tied	6 – Millender	Stegeman Coliseum (5,595); Athens, GA
November 9, 2025*; 2:00 p.m., SECN+/ESPN+		Morehead State	W 120–81	3–0	22 – Wilkinson	6 – Tied	5 – Tied	Stegeman Coliseum (5,706); Athens, GA
November 14, 2025*; 9:00 p.m., SECN		Georgia Tech; Clean, Old-Fashioned Hate	W 92–87	4–0	18 – Tied	6 – Tied	5 – Millender	Stegeman Coliseum (10,523); Athens, GA
November 17, 2025*; 6:30 p.m., SECN		Florida A&M	W 87–57	5–0	14 – Wilkins	10 – Cain	4 – Cain	Stegeman Coliseum (5,971); Athens, GA
November 21, 2025*; 9:00 p.m., ESPN2		vs. Xavier; Charleston Classic Palmetto Bracket Semifinal	W 78–77	6–0	16 – Cain	7 – James	3 – Ross	TD Arena (4,856); Charleston, SC
November 23, 2025*; 1:00 p.m., ESPN		vs. Clemson; Charleston Classic Palmetto Bracket Final	L 94–97 ^{OT}	6–1	26 – Wilkinson	7 – Cain	6 – Millender	TD Arena; Charleston, SC
November 29, 2025*; 2:00 p.m., SECN+/ESPN+		Tennessee Tech	W 123–81	7–1	22 – Millender	7 – Tied	7 – Millender	Stegeman Coliseum (7,125); Athens, GA
December 2, 2025*; 9:00 p.m., ACCN		at Florida State; ACC–SEC Challenge	W 107–73	8–1	22 – Wilkinson	8 – Ross	5 – Cain	Donald L. Tucker Civic Center (6,677); Tallahassee, FL
December 13, 2025*; 2:00 p.m., ESPNU		vs. Cincinnati; Holiday Hoopsgiving	W 84–65	9–1	22 – Cain	7 – Tied	5 – Cain	State Farm Arena; Atlanta, GA
December 18, 2025*; 7:00 p.m., SECN+/ESPN+	No. 25	Western Carolina	W 112–82	10–1	26 – Wilkinson	10 – Cyril	5 – Ross	Stegeman Coliseum (6,652); Athens, GA
December 22, 2025*; 2:00 p.m., SECN+/ESPN+	No. 23	West Georgia	W 103–74	11–1	20 – Cain	15 – Cyril	4 – Cain	Stegeman Coliseum (10,523); Athens, GA
December 29, 2025*; 7:00 p.m., SECN+/ESPN+	No. 23	LIU	W 89–74	12–1	14 – Millender	8 – Stagg	6 – Millender	Stegeman Coliseum (7,541); Athens, GA
SEC regular season
January 3, 2026; 1:00 p.m., SECN	No. 23	Auburn	W 104–100 ^{OT}	13–1 (1–0)	31 – Wilkinson	6 – Tied	3 – Tied	Stegeman Coliseum (10,261); Athens, GA
January 6, 2026; 7:00 p.m., SECN	No. 18	at Florida	L 77–92	13–2 (1–1)	18 – Millender	6 – Tied	2 – Cain	O'Connell Center (9,563); Gainesville, FL
January 10, 2026; 2:00 p.m., ESPN2	No. 18	at South Carolina	W 75–70	14–2 (2–1)	20 – Catchings	7 – Tied	6 – Millender	Colonial Life Arena (11,091); Columbia, SC
January 14, 2026; 7:00 p.m., ESPNU	No. 21	Ole Miss	L 95–97 ^{OT}	14–3 (2–2)	32 – Wilkinson	8 – Tied	5 – Ross	Stegeman Coliseum (10,523); Athens, GA
January 17, 2026; 4:00 p.m., ESPN2	No. 21	No. 17 Arkansas	W 90–76	15–3 (3–2)	20 – Wilkinson	5 – Cyril	5 – Catchings	Stegeman Coliseum (10,523); Athens, GA
January 20, 2026; 9:00 p.m., SECN	No. 21	at Missouri	W 74–72	16–3 (4–2)	18 – Millender	10 – Cain	4 – Cain	Mizzou Arena (11,065); Columbia, MO
January 24, 2026; 1:00 p.m., SECN	No. 21	at Texas	L 67–87	16–4 (4–3)	17 – Wilkinson	5 – Cyril	4 – Wilkinson	Moody Center (10,523); Austin, TX
January 28, 2026; 7:00 p.m., SECN		Tennessee	L 85–86 ^{OT}	16–5 (4–4)	22 – Catchings	7 – Catchings	4 – Millender	Stegeman Coliseum (9,854); Athens, GA
January 31, 2026; 1:00 p.m., SECN		Texas A&M	L 77–92	16–6 (4–5)	17 – Wilkinson	13 – James	5 – Wilkinson	Stegeman Coliseum (10,195); Athens, GA
February 7, 2026; 6:00 p.m., SECN		at LSU	W 83–71	17–6 (5–5)	23 – Catchings	7 – Tied	6 – Millender	Pete Maravich Assembly Center (7,270); Baton Rouge, LA
February 11, 2026; 7:00 p.m., ESPN2		No. 14 Florida	L 66–86	17–7 (5–6)	17 – Cain	11 – Cain	5 – Millender	Stegeman Coliseum (10,034); Athens, GA
February 14, 2026; 3:30 p.m., SECN		at Oklahoma	L 78–94	17–8 (5–7)	20 – Cain	5 – Cain	5 – Millender	Lloyd Noble Center (7,015); Norman, OK
February 17, 2026; 9:00 p.m., ESPN		at Kentucky	W 86–78	18–8 (6–7)	20 – Cain	8 – Cyril	8 – Millender	Rupp Arena (19,780); Lexington, KY
February 21, 2026; 3:30 p.m., SECN		Texas	W 91–80	19–8 (7–7)	19 – Wilkinson	4 – Tied	5 – Tied	Stegeman Coliseum (10,523); Athens, GA
February 25, 2026; 7:00 p.m., SECN		at No. 25 Vanderbilt	L 80–88	19–9 (7–8)	28 – Wilkinson	8 – Cyril	3 – Millender	Memorial Gymnasium (10,460); Nashville, TN
February 28, 2026; 3:30 p.m., SECN		South Carolina	W 87–68	20–9 (8–8)	18 – Wilkinson	4 – Tied	8 – Cain	Stegeman Coliseum (10,523); Athens, GA
March 3, 2026; 6:30 p.m., ESPNews		No. 16 Alabama	W 98–88	21–9 (9–8)	32 – Catchings	10 – Cyril	6 – Millender	Stegeman Coliseum (10,523); Athens, GA
March 7, 2026; 3:30 p.m., SECN		at Mississippi State	W 102–96	22–9 (10–8)	23 – Catchings	6 – Tied	5 – Tied	Humphrey Coliseum (6,670); Starkville, MS
SEC tournament
March 12, 2026; 7:00 p.m., SECN	(7)	vs. (15) Ole Miss; Second round	L 72–76	22–10	19 – Catchings	6 – Tied	4 – Millender	Bridgestone Arena (11,457); Nashville, TN
NCAA tournament
March 19, 2026*; 10:10 p.m., CBS	(8 MW)	vs. (9 MW) Saint Louis; First round	L 77–102	22–11	30 – Wilkinson	4 – Tied	6 – Millender	KeyBank Center (17,213); Buffalo, NY
*Non-conference game. ^{#}Rankings from AP Poll. (#) Tournament seedings in parentheses. MW=Midwest. All times are in Eastern Time.

== Rankings ==
Ranking movements Legend: ██ Increase in ranking ██ Decrease in ranking — = Not ranked RV = Received votes
	Week																				
Poll	Pre	1	2	3	4	5	6	7	8	9	10	11	12	13	14	15	16	17	18	19	Final
AP	—	RV	RV	—	—	RV	25	23	23	18	17	21	RV	RV	RV	—	—	—	RV	—	—
Coaches	—	RV	—	—	—	RV	RV	24	24	20	22	22	RV	RV	RV	—	—	—	RV	—	—
