= Ulric Maligi =

American college basketball coach (born 1984)

- Maligi in 2025

Current position
- Title: Assistant Coach
- Team: Texas
- Conference: SEC

Biographical details
- Born: May 14, 1984 (age 42)
- Education: Howard ('06)

Coaching career (HC unless noted)
- 2006–2007: UT Arlington (assistant)
- 2007–2010: Stephen F. Austin (assistant)
- 2010–2012: Houston (assistant)
- 2012–2015: SMU (assistant)
- 2015–2016: Texas A&M (assistant)
- 2019–2021: Texas Tech (assistant)
- 2021–2022: Texas (assistant)
- 2022–2025: Kansas State (associate HC)
- 2025–present: Texas (assistant)

Ulric Maligi (born May 14, 1984) is an American college basketball coach, and the assistant coach for the Texas Longhorns. Before his role at Texas, Maligi was the associate head coach for the Kansas State Wildcats.

== Coaching career ==
Maligi's coaching career began in 2007 working for Scott Cross at UT-Arlington. After one season at UTA, Maligi was hired at Stephen F. Austin in the same position. In 2010, Maligi was then hired at Houston as an assistant coach. He spent two seasons there before becoming an assistant at SMU for three seasons. After a year working for the famed John Lucas in 2016, Maligi spent three seasons at Texas A&M for Billy Kennedy.

Maligi was then hired by Chris Beard in 2019 as an assistant at Texas Tech. In his first year at Texas Tech, Maligi helped assemble arguably the school’s best recruiting class ever, including the school’s first McDonald’s All-American — Nimari Burnett.

In 2021, Maligi joined Texas alongside Beard, who was hired by his alma mater on April 1.

In 13 seasons as a coach, Maligi has been a part of seven 20-plus win seasons and an assistant coach of six NCAA Tournament teams. Maligi has coached and/or recruited 17 NBA players, including Emmanuel Mudiay, Shake Milton and Robert Williams.

The Athletic recognized Maligi as a 40 under 40 rising star in college basketball in the fall of 2020. ESPN also selected Maligi as one of the nation's top college basketball coaches under the age of 40.
