= Arthur Kaluma =

Ugandan-American basketball player (born 2002)

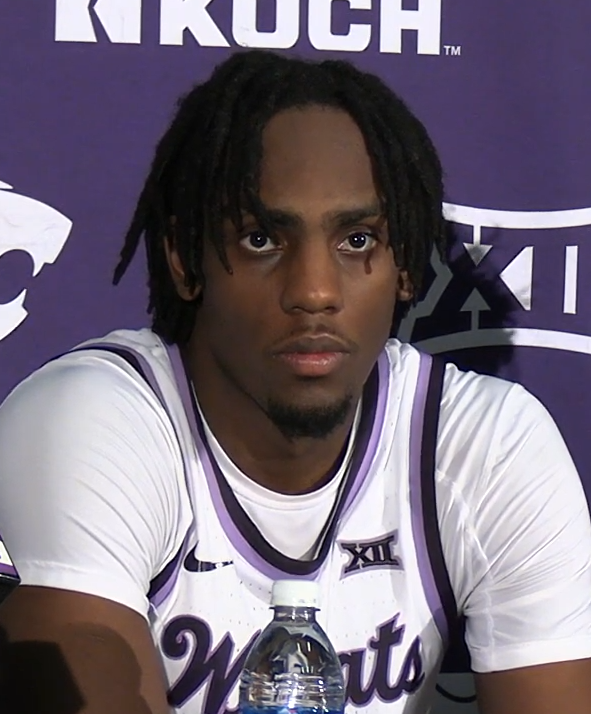
- Kaluma with the Kansas State Wildcats in 2023

No. 47 – Los Angeles Lakers
- Position: Power forward / small forward
- League: NBA

Personal information
- Born: March 1, 2002 (age 24) Boston, Massachusetts, U.S.
- Listed height: 6 ft 7 in (2.01 m)
- Listed weight: 225 lb (102 kg)

Career information
- High school: Universal Academy (Irving, Texas); Dream City Christian (Glendale, Arizona)
- College: Creighton (2021–2023); Kansas State (2023–2024); Texas (2024–2025)
- NBA draft: 2025: undrafted
- Playing career: 2025–present

Career history
- 2025–2026: South Bay Lakers
- 2026–present: Los Angeles Lakers
- 2026–present: →Coachella Valley Lakers

Career highlights
- Big East All-Freshman Team (2022)
- Stats at NBA.com
- Stats at Basketball Reference

Arthur Kaluma (born March 1, 2002) is an Ugandan-American professional basketball player for the Los Angeles Lakers of the National Basketball Association (NBA), on a two-way contract with the Coachella Valley Lakers of the NBA G League.

He played college basketball for the Texas Longhorns, Kansas State Wildcats and Creighton Bluejays.

== Early life ==
Kaluma grew up in Irving, Texas and initially attended Universal Academy. He transferred to Dream City Christian School in Glendale, Arizona prior to his junior year. Kaluma was rated a four-star recruit and initially signed to play for UNLV, but was released from his National Letter of Intent following the departure of head coach T. J. Otzelberger. He ultimately committed to playing college basketball for Creighton over offers from Arizona, Western Kentucky and Syracuse.

== College career ==
Kaluma was named a starter entering his freshman season at Creighton. He finished the season averaging 10.4 points and 5.4 rebounds per game. Kaluma entered his sophomore season on the watch list for the Karl Malone Award. He finished the season averaging 11.8 points, six rebounds and 1.6 assists per game. After the season, Kaluma declared for the 2023 NBA draft while maintaining his eligibility. He later also entered the NCAA transfer portal and eventually withdrew his name from the draft.

Kaluma ultimately transferred to Kansas State. At Kansas State, Kaluma averaged 14.4 points, 7.0 rebounds and 2.0 assists per game in 34.5 minutes a game. At the end of the season, Kaluma transferred to Texas, choosing the Longhorns over SMU.

At Texas, Kaluma averaged 12.3 points, 7.5 rebounds and 1.8 assists per game while shooting 46.2% from the field.

== Professional career ==
=== South Bay Lakers (2025–2026) ===
After going undrafted in the 2025 NBA draft, Kaluma signed with the Los Angeles Lakers as an undrafted free agent. After the 2025 NBA Summer League, Kaluma signed a Exhibit 10 contract—a one-year, non-guaranteed salary for the minimum, allowing him to participate in the Lakers' training camp. He was waived on September 26, then added to the Lakers NBA G League affiliate, the South Bay Lakers.

=== Los Angeles Lakers (2026–present) ===
Kaluma played in the 2026 NBA Summer League for the Los Angeles Lakers, averaging 17.3 points, 3.4 rebounds and 1.7 assists per game. On July 20, 2026, Kaluma signed a two-way contract with the Lakers.

== National team career ==
Kaluma became a Ugandan citizen in 2020. He played for the Uganda men's national basketball team in AfroBasket 2021. Kaluma also joined the team to play in 2023 FIBA Basketball World Cup qualifiers.

== Career statistics ==
Legend
GP	Games played	GS	Games started	MPG	Minutes per game
FG%	Field goal percentage	3P%	3-point field goal percentage	FT%	Free throw percentage
RPG	Rebounds per game	APG	Assists per game	SPG	Steals per game
BPG	Blocks per game	PPG	Points per game	**Bold**	Career high

=== Professional ===
Year	Team	GP	GS	MPG	FG%	3P%	FT%	RPG	APG	SPG	BPG	PPG
2025-26	South Bay Lakers	35	-	26.4	.548	.367	.845	4.9	1.6	0.9	0.5	14.6

=== College ===
Year	Team	GP	GS	MPG	FG%	3P%	FT%	RPG	APG	SPG	BPG	PPG
2021–22	Creighton	31	30	26.8	.444	.265	.671	5.4	1.3	0.6	0.6	10.4
2022–23	Creighton	**37**	**37**	29.4	.423	.311	.736	6.0	1.6	0.5	0.6	11.8
2023–24	Kansas State	33	32	**34.5**	.427	.345	.747	7.0	**2.0**	0.8	0.5	**14.4**
2024–25	Texas	33	32	29.3	**.462**	**.359**	**.784**	**7.5**	1.8	**0.9**	**0.9**	12.3
Career		134	131	30.0	.438	.321	.742	6.5	1.7	0.7	0.6	12.2

== Personal life ==
Kaluma's brother, Adam Seiko, played college basketball at San Diego State. The brothers played each other in the Elite Eight of the 2023 NCAA tournament.
