= Ryan Anderson (basketball, born 1992) =

American basketball player and coach

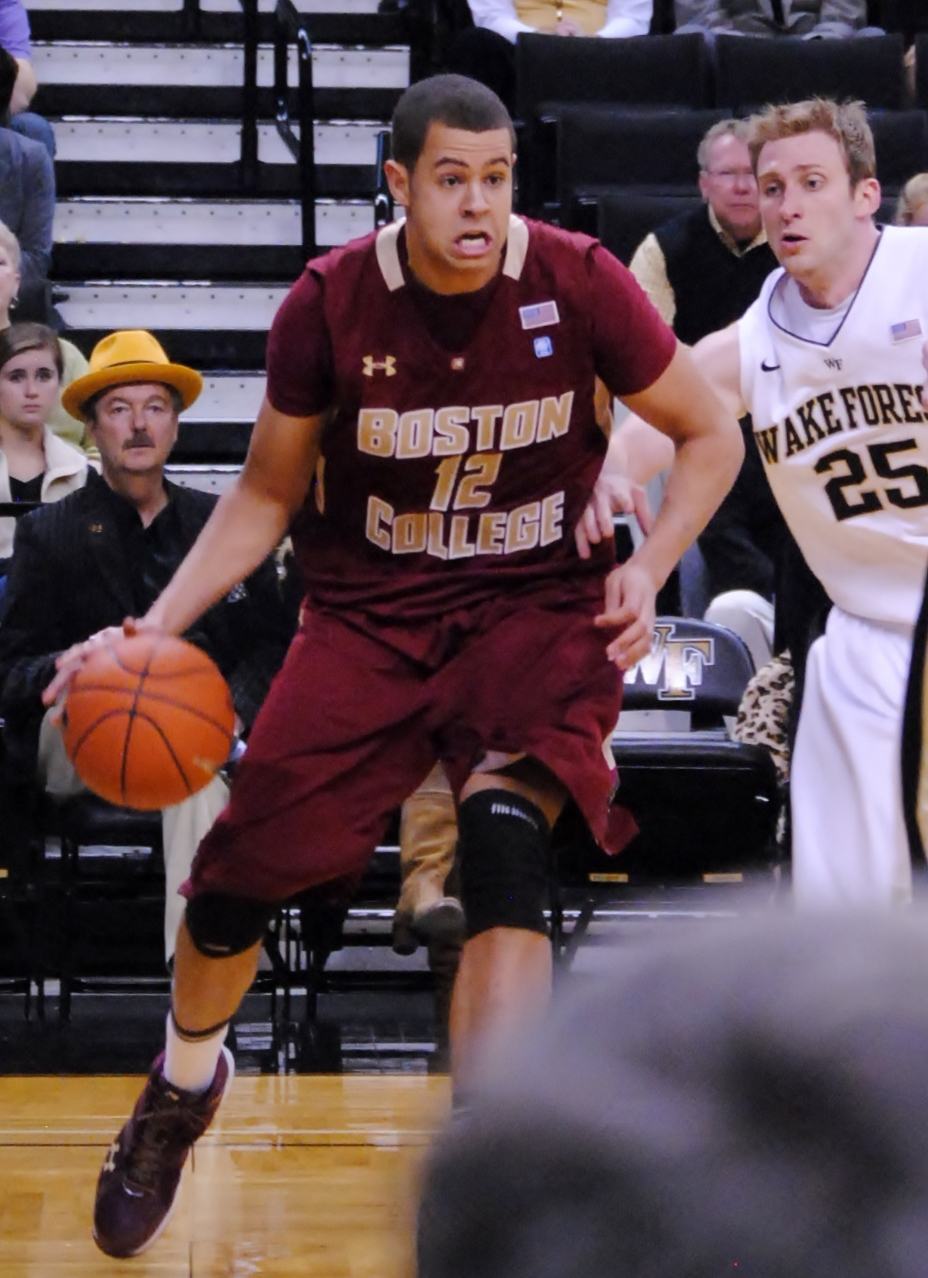
- Anderson playing for Boston College

Texas Longhorns
- Title: Assistant coach
- League: Southeastern Conference

Personal information
- Born: December 4, 1992 (age 33) Lakewood, California, U.S.
- Listed height: 6 ft 9 in (2.06 m)
- Listed weight: 235 lb (107 kg)

Career information
- High school: Long Beach Poly (Long Beach, California)
- College: Boston College (2011–2014); Arizona (2015–2016)
- NBA draft: 2016: undrafted
- Playing career: 2016–2021
- Position: Power forward
- Number: 12, 15
- Coaching career: 2021–present

Career history

Playing
- 2016–2017: Antwerp Giants
- 2017: s.Oliver Würzburg
- 2017: BC Pieno žvaigždės
- 2018–2019: Delaware Blue Coats
- 2019–2020: T71 Dudelange
- 2020: MBC Mykolaiv
- 2020–2021: Šiauliai

Coaching
- 2021–2022: Arizona (GA)
- 2022–2025: Xavier (DPD/RC)
- 2025–present: Texas (assistant)

Career highlights
- Belgian League rebounding leader (2017); Belgian Supercup champion (2016); AP Honorable Mention All-American (2016); First-team All-Pac-12 (2016); Third-team All-ACC (2013); California Mr. Basketball (2011)

Ryan James Anderson (born December 4, 1992) is an American former basketball player. He is currently an assistant coach at Texas. Most recently, Anderson was a director of player development and recruiting at Xavier University. He played college basketball at Arizona and Boston College.

== College career ==
Anderson started his college career out of Long Beach Polytechnic High School in California at Boston College (BC), where he immediately entered the starting lineup for the rebuilding Eagles. The 6'9" power forward averaged 11.2 points and 7.4 rebounds per game and was named unanimously to the Atlantic Coast Conference (ACC) All-freshman team. He then recorded two more successful seasons at BC, but the team had losing campaigns both years and coach Steve Donahue was fired. Two months after the season ended, Anderson chose to transfer, ultimately landing at Arizona.

After sitting out the 2014–15 season per National Collegiate Athletic Association (NCAA) rules, Anderson had a strong campaign in his only season with the Wildcats. He averaged 15.3 points and 10.1 rebounds per game and was the first Wildcat since Jordan Hill in 2008–09 to average a double-double for the season. At the close of the season, Anderson was named first-team All-Pac-12 Conference.

== Professional career ==
After going undrafted in the 2016 NBA draft, Anderson played for the Orlando Magic in the 2016 NBA Summer League. He ultimately signed with the Antwerp Giants in the Belgian League.

Following the 2016–17 campaign, Anderson signed with s.Oliver Würzburg of the German Basketball Bundesliga.

For 2018–19, Anderson joined the Delaware Blue Coats of the NBA G League.

On January 29, 2020, he signed with MBC Mykolaiv in the Ukrainian Basketball Superleague.

On July 11, 2020, he has signed with Šiauliai of the Lithuanian Basketball League.

== Coaching career ==
On September 2, 2021, Anderson returned to Arizona as a graduate assistant.

At the end of the 2024-25 college basketball season, Anderson left Xavier to follow former Xavier head coach Sean Miller to Texas.
