= 2024–25 Tennessee Volunteers basketball team =

American college basketball season

2024–25 Tennessee Volunteers basketball

Bahamas Championship champions

NCAA tournament, Elite Eight
- Conference: Southeastern Conference

Ranking
- Coaches: No. 5
- AP: No. 5
- Record: 30–8 (12–6 SEC)
- Head coach: Rick Barnes (10th season)
- Associate head coach: Justin Gainey
- Assistant coaches: Rod Clark; Gregg Polinsky; Bryan Lentz; Lucas Campbell
- Home arena: Thompson–Boling Arena

2024–25 Southeastern Conference men's basketball standings
	Conf.				Overall
Team	W		L	PCT	W		L	PCT
No. 4 Auburn	15	–	3	.833	32	–	6	.842
No. 1 Florida †	14	–	4	.778	36	–	4	.900
No. 6 Alabama	13	–	5	.722	28	–	9	.757
No. 5 Tennessee	12	–	6	.667	30	–	8	.789
No. 19 Texas A&M	11	–	7	.611	23	–	11	.676
No. 12 Kentucky	10	–	8	.556	24	–	12	.667
Missouri	10	–	8	.556	22	–	12	.647
No. 18 Ole Miss	10	–	8	.556	24	–	12	.667
No. 20 Arkansas	8	–	10	.444	22	–	14	.611
Mississippi State	8	–	10	.444	21	–	13	.618
Georgia	8	–	10	.444	20	–	13	.606
Vanderbilt	8	–	10	.444	20	–	13	.606
Texas	6	–	12	.333	19	–	16	.543
Oklahoma	6	–	12	.333	20	–	14	.588
LSU	3	–	15	.167	14	–	18	.438
South Carolina	2	–	16	.111	12	–	20	.375
† 2025 SEC tournament winner Rankings from AP poll

The 2024–25 Tennessee Volunteers basketball team represented the University of Tennessee during the 2024–25 NCAA Division I men's basketball season. The team was led by tenth-year head coach Rick Barnes and played their home games at Thompson–Boling Arena located in Knoxville, Tennessee, as a member of the Southeastern Conference.

As the No. 4 seed in the SEC men's basketball tournament, held at Bridgestone Arena in Nashville, Tennessee, they received a double bye to the quarterfinals. There, they defeated Texas, 83–72, to advance to the semifinals, where they secured a 70–65 win over eventual Final Four semifinalist Auburn. In the championship game, they lost to the eventual NCAA champion Florida, 86–77.

Tennessee received a bid to the 2025 NCAA tournament as the No. 2 seed in the Midwest region. There, they defeated Wofford, 77–62, in the first round, UCLA, 67–58, in the second round, and SEC rival Kentucky, 78–65, in the Sweet Sixteen to advance to the Elite Eight for the second consecutive year. Just like last year, Tennessee's season once again ended in the Elite Eight with a loss to the eventual runner-up — this time to Houston, 69–50, denying them their first-ever Final Four appearance.

The Tennessee Volunteers drew an average home attendance of 20,026, the 3rd-highest of all college basketball teams.

== Previous season ==
The Volunteers finished the 2023–24 season 27–9, 14–4 in SEC play to finish win the SEC. As the No. 1 seed in the SEC tournament, they were upset by Mississippi State, 73–56, in the quarterfinals. They received an at-large bid to the NCAA tournament as the No. 2 seed in the Mid-West Region, where they defeated Saint Peter's, 83–49, in the First Round, Texas, 62–58, in the Second Round, and Creighton, 82–75, in the Sweet Sixteen, to advance to the Elite Eight. There, they were defeated by the eventual runner-up Purdue, 72–66.

== Offseason ==
=== Departures ===
Departures
Name	Number	Pos.	Height	Weight	Year	Hometown	Reason for departure
Jonas Aidoo	0	F	6'11"	240	Junior	Durham, North Carolina	Transferred to Arkansas
Freddie Dilione V	1	G	6'5"	195	RS Freshman	Fayetteville, North Carolina	Transferred to Penn State
Dalton Knecht	3	G	6'6"	213	Fifth year	Thornton, Colorado	Drafted 17th overall in the 2024 NBA draft by the Los Angeles Lakers
Tobe Awaka	11	F	6'8"	250	Sophomore	Hyde Park, New York	Transferred to Arizona
Santiago Véscovi	25	G	6'3"	196	Fifth year	Montevideo, Uruguay	Exhausted eligiblilty; signed with Baxi Manresa
Josiah-Jordan James	30	G	6'7"	220	Fifth year	Charleston, South Carolina	Declared for the 2024 NBA draft; signed by the Indiana Mad Ants
Colin Coyne	35	F	6'9"	238	Senior	Fredericksburg, Virginia	Graduated; became student assistant coach
D. J. Jefferson	44	G	6'5"	209	RS Freshman	Richardson, Texas	Transferred to Longwood

=== Incoming transfers ===
Incoming transfers
Name	Number	Pos.	Height	Weight	Year	Hometown	Previous school
Chaz Lanier	2	G	6'5"	207	Fifth year	Nashville, Tennessee	North Florida
Igor Miličić Jr.	7	F	6'10"	225	Senior	Rovinj, Croatia	Charlotte
Darlinstone Dubar	8	G	6'6"	220	Fifth year	Charlotte, North Carolina	Hofstra
Felix Okpara	34	F	6'11"	235	Junior	Lagos, Nigeria	Ohio State

=== Recruiting class ===
College recruiting information
Name	Hometown	School	Height	Weight	Commit date
Bishop Boswell; F	Charlotte, North Carolina	Myers Park High School	6 ft 4 in (1.93 m)	203 lb (92 kg)	Sep 28, 2023
Bishop Boswell; F	Recruit ratings: Rivals: 247Sports: ESPN: (86)				
Overall recruit ranking:
Note: In many cases, Scout, Rivals, 247Sports, On3, and ESPN may conflict in their listings of height and weight.; In these cases, the average was taken. ESPN grades are on a 100-point scale.; Sources: "2024 Team Ranking". Rivals.

== Preseason ==
On October 14, 2024 the SEC released their preseason media poll. Tennessee was picked to finish third in the SEC regular season. Senior guard Zakai Zeigler was named to the First Team All-SEC.

=== SEC media poll ===
SEC media poll
Predicted finish	Team
1	Alabama
2	Auburn
3	Tennessee
4	Arkansas
5	Texas A&M
6	Florida
7	Texas
8	Kentucky
9	Ole Miss
10	Mississippi State
11	South Carolina
12	Georgia
13	Missouri
14	LSU
15	Oklahoma
16	Vanderbilt

== Roster ==
2024–25 Tennessee Volunteers men's basketball team
Players
Coaches

Pos.	#	Name	Height	Weight	Year	Previous school	Hometown
G	2	Chaz Lanier (5Y)	6 ft 5 in (1.96 m)	207 lb (94 kg)	Sr	North Florida	Nashville, Tennessee
G	3	Bishop Iamaleava	6 ft 4 in (1.93 m)	203 lb (92 kg)	Fr	Myers Park High School	Charlotte, North Carolina
G	5	Zakai Zeigler	5 ft 9 in (1.75 m)	172 lb (78 kg)	Sr	Our Saviour Lutheran School	Long Island, New York
F	7	Igor Miličić Jr.	6 ft 10 in (2.08 m)	225 lb (102 kg)	Sr	Charlotte	Rovinj, Croatia
G	8	Darlinstone Dubar (5Y)	6 ft 6 in (1.98 m)	220 lb (100 kg)	Sr	Hofstra	Charlotte, North Carolina
G	11	Jordan Gainey	6 ft 4 in (1.93 m)	190 lb (86 kg)	Sr	USC Upstate	Tucson, Arizona
F	12	Cade Phillips	6 ft 9 in (2.06 m)	216 lb (98 kg)	So	Link Academy	Jacksonville, Alabama
F	13	J. P. Estrella	6 ft 11 in (2.11 m)	250 lb (113 kg)	So	Brewster Academy	Scarborough, Maine
G	15	Jahmai Mashack	6 ft 4 in (1.93 m)	202 lb (92 kg)	Sr	Etiwanda High School	Fontana, California
G	21	Campbell Duncan (W)	6 ft 6 in (1.98 m)	200 lb (91 kg)	Fr	Anderson High School	Austin, Texas
G	23	Grant Hurst	6 ft 2 in (1.88 m)	208 lb (94 kg)	RS Jr	UT Martin	Cleveland, Tennessee
G	24	Gavin Paull (W)	5 ft 11 in (1.8 m)	158 lb (72 kg)	Fr	Westlake High School	Austin, Texas
F	34	Felix Okpara	6 ft 11 in (2.11 m)	235 lb (107 kg)	Jr	Ohio State	Lagos, Nigeria
G	35	Ben Linnemeyer (W)	6 ft 6 in (1.98 m)	205 lb (93 kg)	Fr	Link Academy	Columbia, Missouri
G	43	Cameron Carr	6 ft 6 in (1.98 m)	189 lb (86 kg)	So	Link Academy	Eden Prairie, Minnesota

Head coach

- Rick Barnes (Lenoir–Rhyne)

Assistant coach(es)

- Justin Gainey (NC State)
- Rod Clark (Lindsey Wilson)
- Gregg Polinsky (Northern Arizona)
- Bryan Lentz (Lenoir–Rhyne)
- Lucas Campbell (Tennessee)

Legend

- (C) Team captain
- (S) Suspended
- (I) Ineligible
- (W) Walk-on
- (5Y) Fifth-year senior
- Injured
- Current redshirt

Roster
Last update: December 5, 2024

== Schedule and results ==
Date time, TV	Rank^{#}	Opponent^{#}	Result	Record	High points	High rebounds	High assists	Site (attendance) city, state
Exhibition
October 27, 2024*; 3:00 p.m., SECN+	No. 12	No. 17 Indiana	L 62–66	–	13 – Zeigler	8 – Miličić Jr.	8 – Zeigler	Thompson–Boling Arena (13,351); Knoxville, TN
Non-conference regular season
November 4, 2024*; 7:00 p.m., SECN+/ESPN+	No. 12	Gardner–Webb	W 80–64	1–0	18 – Lanier	9 – Okpara	9 – Zeigler	Thompson–Boling Arena (17,813); Knoxville, TN
November 9, 2024*; 12:00 p.m., ACCN	No. 12	at Louisville	W 77–55	2–0	19 – Tied	7 – Mashack	7 – Zeigler	KFC Yum! Center (16,976); Louisville, KY
November 13, 2024*; 7:00 p.m., SECN+/ESPN+	No. 11	Montana	W 92–57	3–0	18 – Miličić Jr.	10 – Miličić Jr.	7 – Zeigler	Thompson–Boling Arena (16,916); Knoxville, TN
November 17, 2024*; 3:00 p.m., SECN+/ESPN+	No. 11	Austin Peay	W 103–68	4–0	23 – Miličić Jr.	9 – Tied	8 – Zeigler	Thompson–Boling Arena (17,232); Knoxville, TN
November 21, 2024*; 9:30 p.m., CBSSN	No. 11	vs. Virginia; Bahamas Championship semifinal	W 64–42	5–0	26 – Lanier	8 – Miličić Jr.	6 – Zeigler	Baha Mar Convention Center (2,077); Nassau, Bahamas
November 22, 2024*; 9:30 p.m., CBSSN	No. 11	vs. No. 13 Baylor; Bahamas Championship final	W 77–62	6–0	25 – Lanier	6 – Mashack	9 – Zeigler	Baha Mar Convention Center (2,119); Nassau, Bahamas
November 27, 2024*; 4:00 p.m., SECN+/ESPN+	No. 7	UT Martin	W 78–35	7–0	18 – Lanier	13 – Miličić Jr.	9 – Zeigler	Thompson–Boling Arena (17,314); Knoxville, TN
December 3, 2024*; 7:30 p.m., ESPN	No. 3	Syracuse; ACC–SEC Challenge	W 96–70	8–0	26 – Lanier	10 – Miličić Jr.	8 – Zeigler	Thompson–Boling Arena (21,678); Knoxville, TN
December 10, 2024*; 6:30 p.m., ESPN	No. 1	vs. Miami (FL); Jimmy V Classic	W 75–62	9–0	22 – Lanier	9 – Miličić Jr.	9 – Zeigler	Madison Square Garden; New York, NY
December 14, 2024*; 5:30 p.m., FOX	No. 1	at Illinois	W 66–64	10–0	23 – Gainey	14 – Miličić Jr.	2 – Tied	State Farm Center (15,544); Champaign, IL
December 17, 2024*; 7:00 p.m., SECN+/ESPN+	No. 1	Western Carolina	W 84–36	11–0	19 – Lanier	10 – Zeigler	9 – Zeigler	Thompson–Boling Arena (16,866); Knoxville, TN
December 23, 2024*; 7:00 p.m., SECN	No. 1	Middle Tennessee	W 82–64	12–0	23 – Lanier	12 – Miličić Jr.	15 – Zeigler	Thompson–Boling Arena (20,706); Knoxville, TN
December 31, 2024*; 3:00 p.m., SECN+/ESPN+	No. 1	Norfolk State	W 67–52	13–0	24 – Lanier	10 – Miličić Jr.	6 – Zeigler	Thompson–Boling Arena (19,616); Knoxville, TN
SEC regular season
January 4, 2025; 1:00 p.m., ESPN	No. 1	No. 23 Arkansas	W 76–52	14–0 (1–0)	29 – Lanier	18 – Miličić Jr.	7 – Zeigler	Thompson–Boling Arena (21,678); Knoxville, TN
January 7, 2025; 7:00 p.m., ESPN2	No. 1	at No. 8 Florida	L 43–73	14–1 (1–1)	10 – Tied	7 – Tied	2 – Mashack	Exactech Arena (11,011); Gainesville, FL
January 11, 2025; 6:00 p.m., ESPN	No. 1	at Texas	W 74–70	15–1 (2–1)	16 – Zeigler	9 – Okpara	8 – Zeigler	Moody Center (10,195); Austin, TX
January 15, 2025; 8:00 p.m., SECN	No. 6	No. 23 Georgia	W 74–56	16–1 (3–1)	19 – Gainey	9 – Miličić Jr.	7 – Zeigler	Thompson–Boling Arena (19,239); Knoxville, TN
January 18, 2025; 3:30 p.m., SECN	No. 6	at Vanderbilt; Rivalry	L 75–76	16–2 (3–2)	17 – Lanier	5 – Miličić Jr.	10 – Zeigler	Memorial Gymnasium (14,316); Nashville, TN
January 21, 2025; 7:00 p.m., ESPN2	No. 6	No. 14 Mississippi State	W 68–56	17–2 (4–2)	23 – Lanier	12 – Okpara	7 – Zeigler	Thompson–Boling Arena (21,678); Knoxville, TN
January 25, 2025; 8:30 p.m., ESPN	No. 6	at No. 1 Auburn; College GameDay	L 51–53	17–3 (4–3)	14 – Zeigler	9 – Okpara	5 – Zeigler	Neville Arena (9,121); Auburn, AL
January 28, 2025; 7:00 p.m., ESPN	No. 8	No. 12 Kentucky; Rivalry	L 73–78	17–4 (4–4)	19 – Miličić Jr.	9 – Miličić Jr.	6 – Zeigler	Thompson–Boling Arena (22,272); Knoxville, TN
February 1, 2025; 12:00 p.m., ESPN	No. 8	No. 5 Florida	W 64–44	18–4 (5–4)	19 – Lanier	8 – Tied	5 – Mashack	Thompson–Boling Arena (21,678); Knoxville, TN
February 5, 2025; 7:00 p.m., SECN	No. 4	No. 15 Missouri	W 85–81	19–4 (6–4)	21 – Tied	10 – Miličić Jr.	8 – Zeigler	Thompson–Boling Arena (20,002); Knoxville, TN
February 8, 2025; 12:00 p.m., ESPN	No. 4	at Oklahoma	W 70–52	20–4 (7–4)	21 – Lanier	6 – Tied	9 – Zeigler	Lloyd Noble Center (10,162); Norman, OK
February 11, 2025; 7:00 p.m., ESPN	No. 5	at No. 15 Kentucky; Rivalry	L 64–75	20–5 (7–5)	17 – Zeigler	9 – Miličić Jr.	6 – Zeigler	Rupp Arena (20,076); Lexington, KY
February 15, 2025; 1:00 p.m., SECN	No. 5	Vanderbilt; Rivalry	W 81–76	21–5 (8–5)	22 – Zeigler	8 – Lanier	8 – Zeigler	Thompson–Boling Arena (21,678); Knoxville, TN
February 22, 2025; 12:00 p.m., ESPN	No. 6	at No. 7 Texas A&M	W 77–69	22–5 (9–5)	30 – Lanier	7 – Okpara	7 – Zeigler	Reed Arena (12,989); College Station, TX
February 25, 2025; 9:00 p.m., SECN	No. 5	at LSU	W 65–59	23–5 (10–5)	17 – Zeigler	9 – Lanier	3 – Tied	Pete Maravich Assembly Center (8,522); Baton Rouge, LA
March 1, 2025; 4:00 p.m., ESPN	No. 5	No. 6 Alabama	W 79–76	24–5 (11–5)	18 – Lanier	9 – Okpara	4 – Zeigler	Thompson–Boling Arena (22,392); Knoxville, TN
March 5, 2025; 9:00 p.m., ESPN2	No. 4	at Ole Miss	L 76–78	24–6 (11–6)	17 – Gainey	7 – Okpara	15 – Ziegler	SJB Pavilion (9,038); Oxford, MS
March 8, 2025; 2:00 p.m., SECN	No. 4	South Carolina	W 75–65	25–6 (12–6)	23 – Lanier	7 – Mashack	8 – Ziegler	Thompson–Boling Arena (21,678); Knoxville, TN
SEC Tournament
March 14, 2025; 3:30 p.m., ESPN	(4) No. 8	vs. (13) Texas; Quarterfinals	W 83–72	26–6	23 – Lanier	7 – Tied	6 – Zeigler	Bridgestone Arena (17,526); Nashville, TN
March 15, 2025; 1:00 p.m., ESPN	(4) No. 8	vs. (1) No. 3 Auburn; Semifinals	W 70–65	27–6	20 – Zeigler	9 – Okpara	4 – Zeigler	Bridgestone Arena (19,049); Nashville, TN
March 16, 2025; 1:00 p.m., ESPN	(4) No. 8	vs. (2) No. 4 Florida; Championship	L 77–86	27–7	24 – Gainey	6 – Mashack	8 – Zeigler	Bridgestone Arena (19,151); Nashville, TN
NCAA Tournament
March 20, 2025*; 6:50 pm, TNT	(2 MW) No. 6	vs. (15 MW) Wofford; First Round	W 77–62	28–7	29 – Lanier	7 – Mashack	12 – Zeigler	Rupp Arena (16,258); Lexington, KY
March 22, 2025*; 9:40 p.m., TBS	(2 MW) No. 6	vs. (7 MW) UCLA; Second Round	W 67–58	29–7	20 – Lanier	7 – Tied	6 – Zeigler	Rupp Arena (17,484); Lexington, KY
March 28, 2025*; 7:39 p.m., TBS/TruTV	(2 MW) No. 6	vs. (3 MW) No. 18 Kentucky; Sweet Sixteen	W 78–65	30–7	18 – Zeigler	11 – Okpara	10 – Zeigler	Lucas Oil Stadium (28,968); Indianapolis, IN
March 30, 2025*; 2:20 p.m., CBS	(2 MW) No. 6	vs. (1 MW) No. 2 Houston; Elite Eight	L 50–69	30–8	17 – Tied	9 – Okpara	5 – Zeigler	Lucas Oil Stadium (18,567); Indianapolis, IN
*Non-conference game. ^{#}Rankings from AP Poll. (#) Tournament seedings in parentheses. MW=Midwest. All times are in Eastern Time.

== Rankings ==
Ranking movements Legend: ██ Increase in ranking ██ Decrease in ranking т = Tied with team above or below ( ) = First-place votes
	Week																				
Poll	Pre	1	2	3	4	5	6	7	8	9	10	11	12	13	14	15	16	17	18	19	Final
AP	12	11	11	7	3	1 (58)	1 (50)	1 (41)	1 (41)	1 (45)	6	6	8	4	5 (1)	6	5	4	8	6	5
Coaches	12	9	9	6	3	1 (25)	1 (22)	1 (20)	1 (20)	1 (21)	6 (1)	7	8	4	4	6	5	4	6т	6	5
