= Grayson High School =

Public high school in Loganville, Georgia, United States

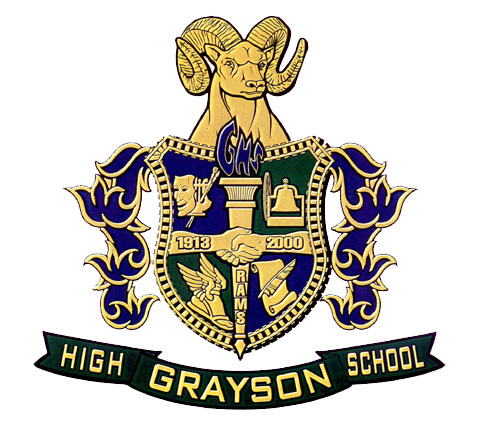

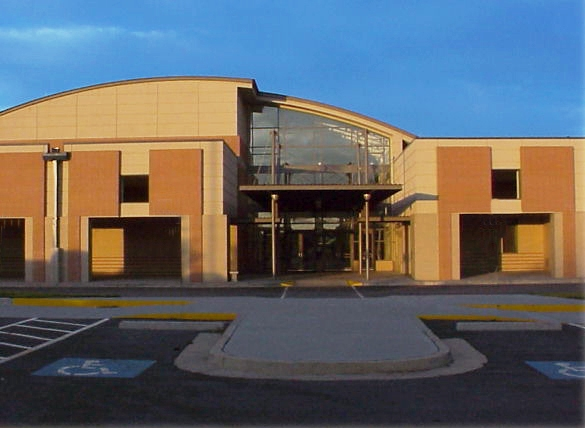
- Front entrance of Grayson High School

Location
- 50 Hope Hollow Road; Loganville, Georgia 30052; United States; 33°52′06″N 83°55′26″W

Information
- Type: Public
- Motto: First Comes Learning
- Established: 2000
- School district: Gwinnett County Public Schools
- Principal: Rukina Stewart
- Teaching staff: 210.60 (FTE)
- Grades: 9–12
- Enrollment: 3,627 (2024–2025)
- Student to teacher ratio: 17.22
- Campus: Suburban/rural
- Colors: Green, gold, navy, and white
- Nickname: Rams
- Accreditation: SACS
- Information: 770-554-1071
- Region: 4 in Class AAAAAAA (GHSA)
- Website: Official website

Grayson High School is located in Loganville, Georgia and has an enrollment of over 3,100 students. The school pulls students from many areas of southeastern Gwinnett County, mainly Grayson, Loganville, and Lawrenceville.

== History ==
Construction on the current Grayson High School building began in August 1998 and the school opened its doors in 2000. The building has 65 classrooms, but as the student body has outgrown it, expansion is required. 42 trailers were formerly located in front of the building, until an expansion of the school was completed in time for the 2021 school year. The Grayson Technical Education School extends past the main high school building and has a greenhouse and Black Box theater among many other facilities. In 2019, the Grayson Technical Education School partnered with Gwinnett Technical College to build a veterinary surgical suite.

== Feeder schools ==
=== Elementary schools ===
- Grayson Elementary (Grayson)
- Pharr Elementary (Snellville)
- Starling Elementary (Grayson)
- Trip Elementary (Grayson)

=== Middle schools ===
- Bay Creek Middle (Grayson)
- Couch Middle (Grayson)

== Notable alumni ==
- Bradley Blalock - MLB baseball player
- Chase Brice - CFL football player
- Ryan Carter - Clemson Coach, former NFL football player
- Kirubel Erassa - track and field athlete
- Wayne Gallman - NFL football player
- Jake Garcia – college football quarterback for the Furman Paladins
- Jamal Haynes - NFL running back
- Trente Jones - Former NFL Linemen
- Isaiah Land - NFL football payer
- Jon Langston - Country music singer
- Phil Mafah - Former Clemson running back
- Austin Meadows - MLB baseball player
- Parker Meadows - MLB Baseball Player
- Wanya Morris - NFL football player
- Denzel Nkemdiche - former Ole Miss football player
- Robert Nkemdiche - NFL football player
- Owen Pappoe - NFL football player
- Quanterus Smith - NFL football player
- Ella Stevens - NWSL Midfielder
- Lorenzo Washington - NFL football player
- Jacob Wilkins - College basketball player
