= Jayson Kent =

American basketball player (born 2002)

No. 29 – Portland Trail Blazers
- Position: Small forward
- League: NBA

Personal information
- Born: February 3, 2002 (age 24) Austin, Texas, U.S.
- Listed height: 6 ft 8 in (2.03 m)
- Listed weight: 210 lb (95 kg)

Career information
- High school: Oak Forest (Oak Forest, Illinois)
- College: Bradley (2020–2022); Indiana State (2022–2024); Texas (2024–2025)
- NBA draft: 2025: undrafted
- Playing career: 2025–present

Career history
- 2025–2026: Rip City Remix
- 2026–present: Portland Trail Blazers
- 2026–present: →Rip City Remix
- Stats at NBA.com
- Stats at Basketball Reference

Jayson Kent (born February 3, 2002) is an American professional basketball player for the Portland Trail Blazers of the National Basketball Association (NBA), on a two-way contract with the Rip City Remix of the NBA G League. He played college basketball for the Bradley Braves, Indiana State Sycamores and Texas Longhorns.

== Early life ==
Kent was born on February 3, 2002, in Austin, Texas. He has several family members who played college basketball or professionally, including his father Jason, mother Anna, uncles Anthony Kent and Jordan Fair, and sister Janae. At age four, his family moved to Chicago, Illinois. Kent attended Oak Forest High School and played basketball there, initially as a guard before switching to forward after having a growth spurt, reaching a height of 6 feet 6 inches (1.98 m) at Oak Forest. He was an all-conference, all-area and all-state performer there and helped Oak Forest to the conference title as a senior, averaging 17.8 points and 5.5 rebounds per game. Kent posted 1,290 points and 350 rebounds in his time in high school. He committed to play college basketball for the Bradley Braves.

== College career ==
Kent appeared in 23 games as a freshman at Bradley in 2020–21, averaging 3.6 points and 1.1 rebounds. He became a starter as a sophomore in 2021–22, playing in 28 games while averaging 6.9 points, after which he entered the NCAA transfer portal. He transferred to the Indiana State Sycamores and played two seasons for them. Kent averaged 5.1 points per game in 2022–23, his first year with the Sycamores. He then averaged 13.5 points and 8.1 rebounds during the 2023–24 season, helping Indiana State to a record of 32–7. He helped them reach the finals of the 2024 National Invitation Tournament, where they lost 79–77 to the Seton Hall Pirates. He was a second-team All-Missouri Valley Conference (MVC) selection and was named to the MVC All-Defensive team for his performance that year. Kent transferred to the Texas Longhorns for his final season in 2024–25. He averaged 5.6 points in 27 games in his lone year with the Longhorns.

== Professional career ==
Kent was not selected in the 2025 NBA draft. He attended a local tryout for the Rip City Remix of the NBA G League and won a roster spot. He impressed with the Remix, posting an average of 11.9 points and 4.1 rebounds in his first 37 games. Afterwards, Kent was signed by the NBA's Portland Trail Blazers to a two-way contract on March 3, 2026. On March 16, he made his NBA debut against the Brooklyn Nets, playing for three minutes and making his only shot.

== Career statistics ==
Legend
GP	Games played	GS	Games started	MPG	Minutes per game
FG%	Field goal percentage	3P%	3-point field goal percentage	FT%	Free throw percentage
RPG	Rebounds per game	APG	Assists per game	SPG	Steals per game
BPG	Blocks per game	PPG	Points per game	**Bold**	Career high

=== NBA ===
Year	Team	GP	GS	MPG	FG%	3P%	FT%	RPG	APG	SPG	BPG	PPG
2025–26	Portland	5	0	4.4	.571	.250	1.000	1.0	.0	.2	.2	2.0
Career		5	0	4.4	.571	.250	1.000	1.0	.0	.2	.2	2.0

=== College ===
Year	Team	GP	GS	MPG	FG%	3P%	FT%	RPG	APG	SPG	BPG	PPG
2020–21	Bradley	23	4	9.9	.366	.280	.800	1.1	.3	.3	.0	3.6
2021–22	Bradley	28	15	20.4	.382	.264	.635	2.9	.5	.6	.2	6.9
2022–23	Indiana State	35	6	14.7	.468	.271	.795	2.1	.4	.4	.2	5.1
2023–24	Indiana State	**38**	**37**	**30.3**	**.639**	**.366**	**.837**	**8.1**	**.6**	**.7**	**.5**	**13.5**
2024–25	Texas	27	3	17.2	.509	.270	.545	3.3	.4	.5	.3	5.6
Career		151	65	19.4	.507	.294	.737	3.8	.4	.5	.3	7.4
