= Link Academy (Missouri) =

School in Missouri, United States

Coordinates: 36.6564989°N 93.2122252°W

Location
- 1353 Lake Shore Drive; Branson, Taney County, Missouri 65616; United States

Information
- Type: Boarding school
- Established: 2011
- President: Adam Donyes
- Grades: 9–12
- Colors: Black and gold
- Athletics conference: Nike EYBL Scholastic
- Mascot: Lion
- Website: linkacademylions.com linkhoops.com

Link Academy is a boarding school just outside of Branson, Missouri. Known for its basketball teams, it won the 2023 Men's GEICO National Championship and the 2025 Nike EYBL Scholastic Conference Tournament Championship. It was founded by former college basketball player Adam Donyes.

== McDonald's All American Players ==
- 2025 Chris Cenac Jr.
- 2024 Tre Johnson
- 2023 Ja'Kobe Walter
- 2022 Julian Phillips
- 2022 Jordan Walsh

== National championship history ==
In Link Academy's inaugural year, the high school team secured the #4 seed in the 2022 GEICO National Championships and finished the tournament as the runner-ups. In their second year, the Lions once again entered the tournament as the #4 seed, and won the overall championship title. The Lions entered the 2023-2024 Chipotle National Championship Tournament (successor to the GEICO National Championships) as the #6 seed, and became the sole high school program to make the semi-finals for three seasons in a row (2021-2022, 2022-2023, and 2023-2024). The 2024-2025 team earned the highest seed in Link Academy history, entering the 2025 Chipotle National Tournament as the #2 seed.

== Notable alumni ==
- JaMicheal Morgan (2017), basketball player who played in Kosovo
- Felix Okpara (2022), basketball player for the Tennessee Volunteers
- Julian Phillips (2022), basketball player for the Chicago Bulls
- Tarris Reed (2022), basketball player for the Connecticut Huskies
- Jordan Walsh (2022), basketball player for the Boston Celtics
- Elliot Cadeau (2023), basketball player for the Michigan Wolverines
- Ja'Kobe Walter (2023), basketball player for the Toronto Raptors
- Bryson Warren (2023 - transferred), basketball player for the Westchester Knicks
- Tre Johnson (2024), basketball player for the Texas Longhorns
- Labaron Philon Jr. (2024), basketball player for the Philadelphia 76ers (formerly for the Alabama Crimson Tide)
- Chris Cenac (2025), basketball player for the Houston Cougars
- Jasper Johnson (2025 - transferred), basketball player for the Oregon Ducks

== Head coaches ==
- 2021-2022 Rodney Perry Named Assistant Coach at Kansas State in July 2022.
- 2022-2024 Bill Armstrong Named Head Coach at McNeese State in March 2025 after serving as an assistant coach for the Baylor Bears from 2024 to 2025.
- 2024–present Chad Myers
