= Tyran Stokes =

American basketball player (born 2007)

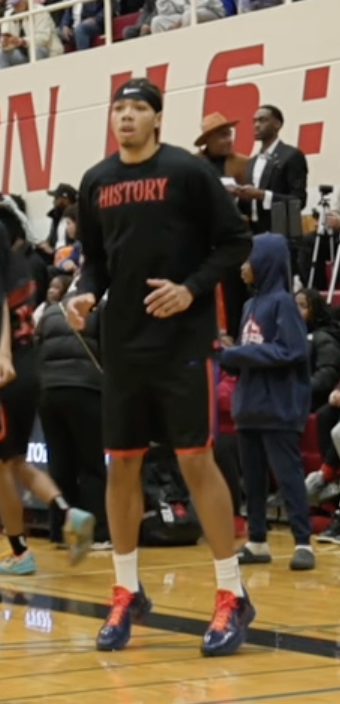
- Stokes in 2025.

No. 4 – Kansas Jayhawks
- Position: Shooting guard
- Conference: Big 12 Conference

Personal information
- Born: October 12, 2007 (age 19) Louisville, Kentucky, U.S.
- Listed height: 6 ft 8 in (2.03 m)
- Listed weight: 230 lb (104 kg)

Career information
- High school: Prolific Prep (Napa, California); Notre Dame (Sherman Oaks, California); Rainier Beach (Seattle, Washington)
- College: Kansas (2026–present)

Career highlights
- McDonald's All-American (2026); Jordan Brand Classic MVP (2026); Nike Hoop Summit (2026); Washington Mr. Basketball (2026)
Medals
Men's basketball
Representing United States
FIBA Under-19 World Cup
Gold medal – first place	2025 Switzerland	Team
FIBA Under-17 World Cup
Gold medal – first place	2024 Turkey	Team
FIBA Under-16 Americas Championship
Gold medal – first place	2023 Mexico	Team

Tyran Stokes (born October 12, 2007) is an American college basketball player for the Kansas Jayhawks of the Big 12 Conference. He was a consensus five-star recruit and the top-ranked player in the 2026 class.

== Early life ==
Stokes began playing basketball competitively as a first grader in his hometown of Louisville, Kentucky. At the age of nine, he moved to San Diego and then the Atlanta area before settling in Napa, California. As an eighth grader in 2022, Stokes played in the Nike Peach Jam under-16 category for Team WhyNot.

== High school career ==
=== Prolific Prep (2022–2024) ===
Stokes enrolled at Prolific Prep ahead of his freshman season. He averaged 10.0 points, 6.5 rebounds, and 3.0 assists per game and helped the Crew to an appearance in the GEICO Nationals, earning MaxPreps Freshman All-America honors. That offseason, Stokes was one of just two players from the 2026 class (along with AJ Dybantsa) invited to the 2023 NBAPA Top 100 Camp. He was noted by Russ Wood of Rivals.com as one of the standout performers on the final day of competition, concluding that he had "elite prospect written all over him." A week later at the Nike Peach Jam, Stokes averaged 11.5 points, 5.3 rebounds, and 4.5 assists per game on 51.3 percent shooting, helping Vegas Elite to a second-place finish in the under-17 category.

Ahead of his sophomore season, Stokes improved his strength and added weight to his frame. He was joined at Prolific Prep by fellow top recruit AJ Dybantsa. Stokes averaged 13.1 points, 5.7 rebounds and 3.1 assists per game as he helped Prolific Prep to another appearance in the Chipotle (formerly GEICO) Nationals, earning MaxPreps Sophomore All-America honors. In the offseason, he excelled on the Nike EYBL circuit for the Oakland Soldiers. At the Nike Peach Jam, Stokes averaged 20.4 points, 9.0 rebounds and 3.4 assists per game. He helped the Soldiers reach the event's under-17 final, where he posted 22 points and nine rebounds in a 71–62 loss to Nightrydas Elite, which starred Cameron Boozer, Cayden Boozer and Caleb Wilson.

=== Notre Dame High (2024–2025) ===
Stokes transferred to Notre Dame High School in Sherman Oaks, California, for his junior season. After rehabilitating from wrist surgery, he made his team debut on December 13, 2024, scoring 20 points in an 82–55 win over Fairfax. Stokes averaged 21 points, 9.2 rebounds and 3.9 assists per game on the season, helping the Knights reach the Southern Section Open Division final and the Southern California Regional final. He also played high school football at Sherman Oaks, posting two receptions for 57 yards and a touchdown against Culver City in his first game. In the offseason at the Nike Peach Jam, Stokes led all players with 10.4 rebounds per game and ranked second only behind teammate Jason Crowe Jr. with 22.2 points per contest. The following month, he won MVP honors at the 7th annual SLAM Summer Classic at Rucker Park after a 27-point performance.

=== Rainier Beach (2025–2026) ===
In November 2025, days before the start of his senior season, Stokes withdrew from Notre Dame. The following week, he enrolled at Rainier Beach High School in Seattle, Washington, teaming up with JJ Crawford, son of Jamal Crawford. Stokes made his team debut on December 3 and scored 31 points, including 21 in the second half, in an 81–60 win over Renton. On February 4, 2026, Stokes scored a career-high 63 points in a decimating 107–38 senior night win against West Seattle High School, breaking the school record. Throughout his senior season, Stokes averaged 31.0 points, 13.0 rebounds, 6.0 assists, and 4.0 steals per game, as Rainier Beach maintained a 29–1 record and won the Washington 3A state championship.

=== Recruiting ===
Stokes is a consensus five-star recruit and is considered the top high school prospect of the 2026 class. In June 2023, he became the number one recruit in the 2026 class when the top recruit, AJ Dybantsa, reclassified to the 2025 class. Stokes was temporarily overtaken by Brandon McCoy Jr. for the top spot in the 247Sports rankings in January 2024. However, he reclaimed the spot in the next rankings update that June after strong offseason.

In October 2025, Stokes announced that his top five schools were Kansas, Kentucky, Louisville, Oregon and USC. The following month, he trimmed the list to Kansas, Kentucky, and Oregon. On April 28, 2026, Stokes verbally committed to Kansas.

College recruiting
Name	Hometown	School	Height	Weight	Commit date
Tyran Stokes; SF	Louisville, KY	Notre Dame High School (CA)	6 ft 7 in (2.01 m)	230 lb (100 kg)	Apr 28, 2026
Tyran Stokes; SF	Recruit ratings: Rivals: 247Sports: ESPN: (96)				
Overall recruit ranking: Rivals: 1 247Sports: 1 ESPN: 1
Note: In many cases, Scout, Rivals, 247Sports, On3, and ESPN may conflict in their listings of height and weight.; In these cases, the average was taken. ESPN grades are on a 100-point scale.; Sources:

== National team career ==
Stokes won a gold medal with the United States at the 2023 FIBA Under-16 Americas Championship in Mexico, averaging 10.3 points, 4.8 rebounds and 3.8 assists per game. The following year, he helped the United States win a gold medal at the 2024 FIBA Under-17 World Cup in Turkey after he averaged 12.3 points, 7.0 rebounds, and 5.6 assists.

== Personal life ==
Stokes signed a multi-year name, image, and likeness (NIL) shoe deal with Nike in October 2025 alongside fellow five-star recruits Brandon McCoy Jr. and Aaliyah Chavez.
