= Nate Bittle =

American basketball player (born 2003)

No. 12 – Toronto Raptors
- Position: Center
- League: NBA

Personal information
- Born: June 3, 2003 (age 23) Central Point, Oregon, U.S.
- Listed height: 7 ft 0 in (2.13 m)
- Listed weight: 215 lb (98 kg)

Career information
- High school: Crater (Central Point, Oregon); Prolific Prep (Napa, California)
- College: Oregon (2021–2026)
- NBA draft: 2026: undrafted
- Playing career: 2026–present

Career history
- 2026–present: Toronto Raptors
- 2026–present: →Raptors 905

Career highlights
- Third-team All-Big Ten (2025); Big Ten All-Defensive Team (2025); McDonald's All-American (2021); Nike Hoop Summit (2021)
- Stats at NBA.com
- Stats at Basketball Reference

Nathan Bittle (born June 3, 2003) is an American professional basketball player for the Toronto Raptors of the National Basketball Association (NBA), on a two-way contract with the Raptors 905 of the NBA G League. He played college basketball for the Oregon Ducks.

== High school career ==
Bittle played basketball for Crater High School in Central Point, Oregon. In his sophomore season, he averaged 21.3 points, 8.5 rebounds and 4.5 blocks per game. He had 10 blocks, an Oregon School Activities Association state tournament single-game record, against Pendleton High School in a 5A consolation game. As a junior, he averaged 25 points, 11 rebounds and 4.5 blocks per game, leading his team to the 5A state semifinals before the tournament was cancelled due to the COVID-19 pandemic. He earned 5A Player of the Year accolades from The Oregonian. Bittle transferred to Prolific Prep in Napa, California for his senior season, after his Amateur Athletic Union (AAU) coach Mark Phelps was hired as head coach of the program. He was named to the rosters for the McDonald's All-American Game, Jordan Brand Classic and Nike Hoop Summit.

=== Recruiting ===
Bittle was considered a five-star recruit by 247Sports and ESPN, and a four-star recruit by Rivals. On September 15, 2020, he committed to playing college basketball for Oregon over offers from Gonzaga, UCLA and Arizona.

College recruiting
| Name | Hometown | School | Height | Weight | Commit date |
|---|---|---|---|---|---|
| Nathan Bittle; C | Central Point, OR | Prolific Prep (CA) | 6 ft 11 in (2.11 m) | 200 lb (91 kg) | Sep 15, 2020 |
| Nathan Bittle; C | Recruit ratings: Rivals: 247Sports: ESPN: (94) | | | | |
Overall recruit ranking: Rivals: 42 247Sports: 25 ESPN: 11
Note: In many cases, Scout, Rivals, 247Sports, On3, and ESPN may conflict in their listings of height and weight.; In these cases, the average was taken. ESPN grades are on a 100-point scale.; Sources: "Oregon 2021 Basketball Commitments". Rivals.; "2021 Oregon Ducks Recruiting Class". ESPN.; "2021 Team Ranking". Rivals.

== College career ==
After playing sparingly as a freshman, Bittle averaged 7.3 points and 5.1 rebounds per game as a sophomore. He missed nine weeks as a junior following surgery on his left wrist. On May 4, 2026, Bittle was selected to be a participant in the 2026 NBA G League tryouts.

== Professional ==
On July 10, 2026, Bittle signed an Exhibit 10 contract with the Toronto Raptors.On October 17, 2026, the Raptors converted Bittle to a two-way contract.

== Career statistics ==
Legend
| GP | Games played | GS | Games started | MPG | Minutes per game |
| FG% | Field goal percentage | 3P% | 3-point field goal percentage | FT% | Free throw percentage |
| RPG | Rebounds per game | APG | Assists per game | SPG | Steals per game |
| BPG | Blocks per game | PPG | Points per game | **Bold** | Career high |

=== College ===
| Year | Team | GP | GS | MPG | FG% | 3P% | FT% | RPG | APG | SPG | BPG | PPG |
|---|---|---|---|---|---|---|---|---|---|---|---|---|
| 2021–22 | Oregon | 23 | 0 | 6.9 | .500 | .200 | .529 | 1.9 | .2 | .2 | .7 | 1.7 |
| 2022–23 | Oregon | 28 | 22 | 18.3 | .490 | **.339** | .667 | 5.1 | .8 | .4 | 1.2 | 7.3 |
| 2023–24 | Oregon | 5 | 5 | 17.2 | .487 | .333 | .727 | 4.4 | .8 | .6 | 1.0 | 10.0 |
| 2024–25 | Oregon | **35** | **35** | 27.7 | **.511** | .336 | **.811** | **7.6** | 1.9 | .8 | **2.1** | 14.2 |
| 2025–26 | Oregon | 25 | 25 | **31.1** | .465 | .319 | .732 | 6.9 | **2.6** | **.9** | 1.8 | **16.8** |
| Career | | 116 | 87 | 21.6 | .490 | .328 | .736 | 5.6 | 1.4 | .6 | 1.5 | 10.4 |

== Personal life ==
Bittle's father, Ryan, played college basketball at the Oregon Institute of Technology.
