= Brandon McCoy Jr. =

American basketball player (born 2007)

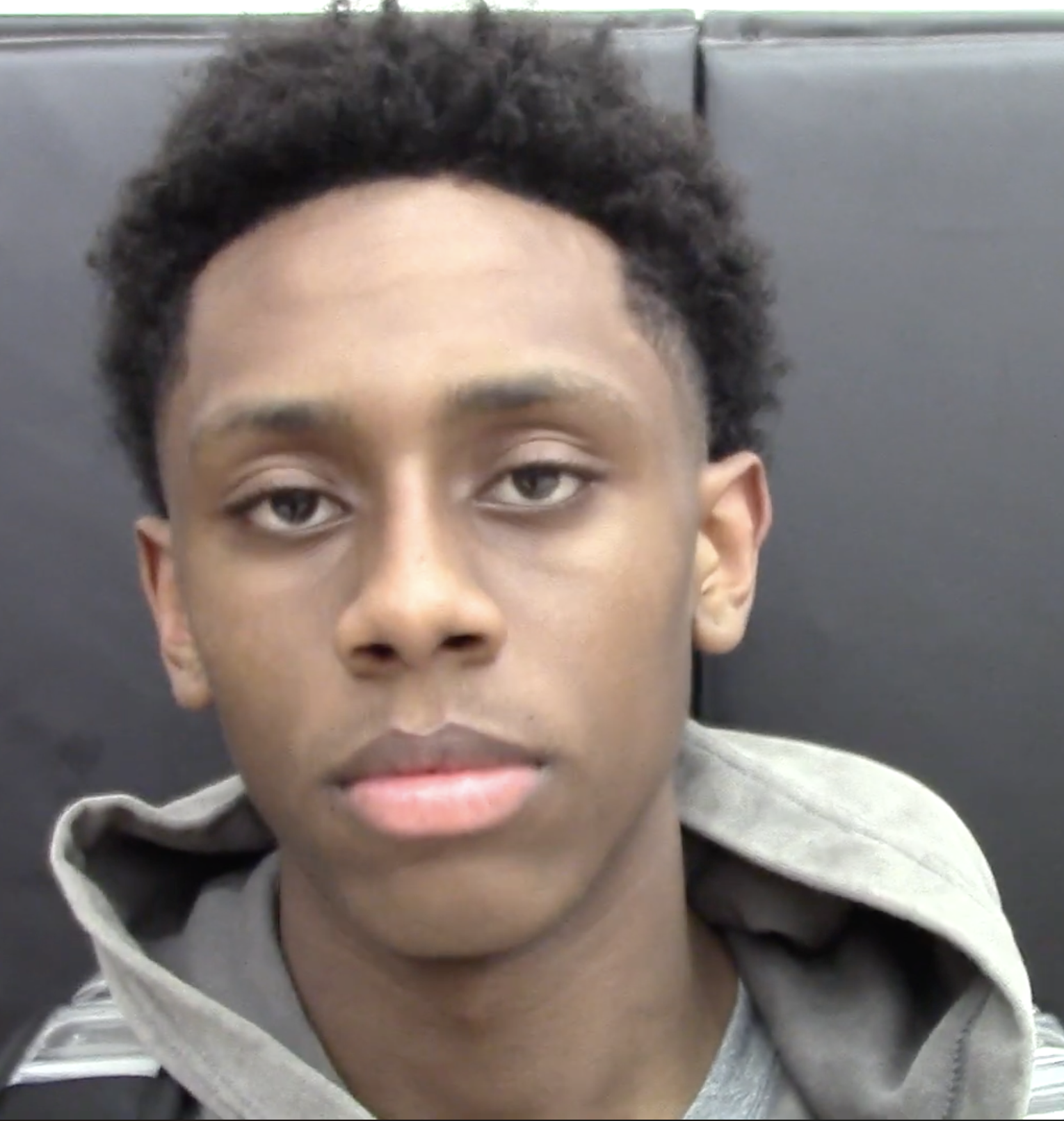
- McCoy in 2025

No. 4 – Michigan Wolverines
- Position: Shooting guard
- Conference: Big Ten Conference

Personal information
- Born: November 13, 2007 (age 18) Oakland, California, U.S.
- Listed height: 6 ft 5 in (1.96 m)
- Listed weight: 200 lb (91 kg)

Career information
- High school: St. John Bosco (Bellflower, California); Sierra Canyon (Los Angeles, California)
- College: Michigan

Career highlights
- McDonald's All-American (2026); Jordan Brand Classic (2026); Nike Hoop Summit (2026)
Medals
Men's basketball
Representing the United States
FIBA Under-19 World Cup
Gold medal – first place	2025 Switzerland	Team
FIBA Under-17 World Cup
Gold medal – first place	2024 Turkey	Team
FIBA Under-16 Americas Championship
Gold medal – first place	2023 Mexico	Team

Brandon "Beezy" McCoy Jr. (born November 13, 2007) is an American college basketball player for the Michigan Wolverines of the Big Ten Conference. He played high school basketball for Sierra Canyon School in Los Angeles, California. He was a consensus five-star recruit, earning McDonald's All-American honors and was the California MaxPreps Player of the Year as a senior in 2026. McCoy was also the MaxPreps National Sophomore of the Year and the FIBA Under-17 World Cup Defensive MVP in 2024.

== Early life ==
McCoy was born on November 13, 2007, in Oakland, California. He grew up in Oakland before moving to Los Angeles with his father as an incoming freshman in high school. He attended St. John Bosco High School and played basketball there as a guard. He averaged 8.6 point and 4.5 rebounds per game as a freshman while serving as the team's sixth man, helping them to an appearance in the CIF-SS Open Division championship. As a sophomore in 2023–24, he averaged 18.6 points, 8.0 rebounds, 2.4 assists and 2.4 steals per game, being honored as the MaxPreps National Sophomore of the Year. McCoy was also selected as the Press-Telegram Player of the Year. McCoy missed a portion of the 2024–25 season due to injury, but was still named honorable mention All-American by MaxPreps and averaged 16.5 points and 5.9 rebounds per game. In August 2025, he transferred to Sierra Canyon School for his senior season. In his debut with Sierra Canyon, McCoy scored 25 points, including nine slam dunks in the Trailblazers' 60–45 win over the JSerra Lions in the Trinity-Mission League Challenge at UCLA's Pauley Pavilion on November 22, 2025. He led Sierra Canyon to a 30–1 record and the Open Division State Championship in 2026. For the season, McCoy averaged 19.2 points, 7.4 rebounds, 3.5 assists and 2.2 steals per game, while shooting 61.8%.

McCoy was unanimously selected as a five-star recruit in the class of 2026 by the three major recruiting outlets. He finished ranked 19th by ESPN, 11th by 247Sports and the 3rd overall player in the nation by rivals (On3.com). McCoy was the highest ranked high school recruit by 247Sports and rivals to ever sign with the Michigan Wolverines (since 21st century). At one time he was also ranked inside the top-10 by ESPN. On March 17, McCoy was named the 2025–26 MaxPreps California Player of the Year. On March 31, in the 2026 McDonald's All-American Game, McCoy had a game-high five assists (tied with Jason Crowe Jr.). On April 4, McCoy committed to play college basketball for head coach Dusty May and the Michigan Wolverines. He announced his commitment at halftime during the Final Four game between Michigan and Arizona, as the Wolverines went on to win the national championship in 2026. At the Nike Hoops Summit, McCoy posted 11 points (including two game-tying free throws with 0.6 seconds remaining in regulation), five assists, four steals and three blocks. On April 17, he had 20 points and six rebounds in the Jordan Brand Classic.

== College career ==
On April 28, 2026, McCoy signed to play college basketball at the University of Michigan for head coach Dusty May and the Wolverines. After May left to coach the Dallas Mavericks in June, McCoy remained with the program. On September 1, it was announced that McCoy would miss his entire freshman season after suffering a torn ACL against KK Mega Basket in an exhibition match on August 27.

== National team career ==
McCoy was a member of the United States national team at the 2023 FIBA Under-16 Americas Championship, winning a gold medal. He then played for the national team at the 2024 FIBA Under-17 World Cup, winning a second gold medal while averaging 10.0 points, 3.4 rebounds and 4.3 assists per game. He was awarded the best defensive player at the Under-17 World Cup. McCoy played for the national team at the 2025 FIBA Under-19 World Cup and won the third gold medal of his national team career.

== Personal life ==
In October 2025, McCoy signed a multi-year name, image, and likeness (NIL) shoe deal with Nike. He did so alongside fellow elite five-star recruits, Tyran Stokes and Aaliyah Chavez. In August 2026, rapper Nine Vicious released an athlete-titled song, “Brandon McCoy Jr.”.
