= 2026 McDonald's All-American Boys Game =

American high school basketball game

West	East
102	86
- Date: March 31, 2026
- Venue: Desert Diamond Arena, Glendale, AZ
- MVP: Jason Crowe Jr. & Caleb Holt
- Network: ESPN

McDonald's All-American

The 2026 McDonald's All-American Boys Game was an all-star basketball game played on March 31, 2026, at the Desert Diamond Arena in Glendale, Arizona. The game's rosters featured the best and most highly recruited high school boys graduating in the class of 2026. The game was the 49th annual version of the McDonald's All-American Game first played in 1977. The 24 players were selected from over 700 nominees by a committee of basketball experts. They were chosen not only for their on-court skills, but for their performances off the court as well.

== Rosters ==
The roster was announced on February 2, 2026. The USC Trojans have the most selections with three. At the announcement of the roster selections 13 schools were represented while Darius Bivins, Bruce Branch III, Christian Collins, Caleb Holt, Brandon McCoy, Jaxon Richardson, Jordan Smith Jr. and Tyran Stokes were uncommitted. On March 3, 2026, Bruce Branch III committed to BYU, followed by Jaxon Richardson committing to Alabama on March 5, 2026. On March 10, 2026, on ESPN's First Take, Caleb Holt committed to Arizona. Christian Collins committed to USC on March 28, 2026. On April 28, 2026 Stokes committed to Kansas on Inside the NBA.

=== Team East ===
Boys East Head Coach: Roy Sanchez, Eldorado High School (NM)

Boys East Asst. Coach: Adam Huff, Eldorado High School (NM)

Boys East Asst. Coach: Issac Massie, Eldorado High School (NM)

ESPN 100 Rank	Name	Height (ft–in)	Weight (lb)	Position	Hometown	High school	College choice
42	Latrell Allmond	6−8	225	PF	Richmond, VA	Petersburg High School	Oklahoma State
51	Darius Bivins^	5−10	165	PG	Alexandria, VA	Bishop O'Connell High School	St. Mary's
6	Bruce Branch III^	6−7	195	SF	Gilbert, AZ	Prolific Prep	BYU
14	Toni Bryant	6−9	205	PF	Tampa, FL	Southeastern Prep Academy	Missouri
31	Jasiah Jervis	6−5	190	SG	White Plains, NY	Archbishop Stepinac High School	Michigan State
18	Taylen Kinney	6−2	175	PG	Newport, KY	Overtime Elite	Kansas
10	Adonis Ratliff	7−0	215	C	White Plains, NY	Archbishop Stepinac High School	USC
26	Darius Ratliff	7−0	215	C	White Plains, NY	Archbishop Stepinac High School	USC
15	Jaxon Richardson^	6−6	205	SF	Miami, FL	Southeastern Prep Academy	Alabama
16	Deron Rippey Jr.	6−1	175	PG	Blairstown, NJ	Blair Academy	Duke
3	Jordan Smith Jr.^	6−2	195	SG	Fairfax, VA	Paul VI High School	Arkansas
12	Anthony Thompson	6−8	200	SF	Lebanon, OH	Western Reserve Academy	Ohio State

Note: *

=== Team West ===
Boys West Head Coach: Jeffrey Kaufman, Coronado High School (NV)

Boys West Asst. Coach: Eric Snow, Coronado High School (NV)

Boys West Asst. Coach: Joshua Giles, Centennial High School (CA)

ESPN 100 Rank	Name	Height (ft–in)	Weight (lb)	Position	Hometown	High school	College choice
25	Maximo Adams	6−7	215	PF	Northridge, CA	Sierra Canyon High School	North Carolina
11	JaShawn Andrews	6−7	230	SF	Little Rock, AR	Little Rock Christian Academy	Arkansas
8	Christian Collins^	6−8	200	PF	Los Angeles, CA	St. John Bosco High School	USC
29	Quinn Costello	6−9	205	C	Boston, MA	The Newman School	Michigan
4	Jason Crowe Jr.	6−3	170	PG	Lynwood, CA	Inglewood High School	Missouri
20	Arafan Diané	7−0	295	C	Des Moines, IA	Iowa United Prep	Houston
13	Caleb Gaskins	6−8	210	PF	Melbourne, FL	Christopher Columbus High School	Miami (FL)
23	Austin Goosby	6−5	175	SG	Melissa, TX	Dynamic Prep	Texas
5	Caleb Holt^	6−5	200	SF	Loganville, GA	Prolific Prep	Arizona
19	Brandon McCoy^	6−4	180	PG	Bellflower, CA	Sierra Canyon High School	Michigan
1	Tyran Stokes^	6−7	230	SF	Seattle, WA	Rainier Beach High School	Kansas
2	Cameron Williams	6−11	195	PF	Phoenix, AZ	Saint Mary's High School	Duke

^undecided at the time of roster selection
~undecided at game time
†decommitted from original school before game was played
‡decommitted from school after game was played

== Box Score ==
ESPN

March 31, 2026
09:30 pm ET

East	86–102	West
Scoring by quarter: –, –, –, –

Desert Diamond Arena, Glendale, AZ
