= Bruce Branch =

Bruce Branch may refer to:

- Bruce Branch (American football) (born 1978), American football player
- Bruce Branch III (born 2008), American college basketball player
