= Kuany Kuany =

Kuany Kuany may refer to:

- Kuany Kuany (basketball, born 1994), South Sudanese basketball player
- Kuany Kuany (basketball, born 2000), South Sudanese basketball player
