= Christian Collins (basketball) =

American basketball player (born 2007)

No. 7 – USC Trojans
- Position: Power forward
- Conference: Big Ten Conference

Personal information
- Born: September 11, 2007 (age 19)
- Listed height: 6 ft 9 in (2.06 m)
- Listed weight: 200 lb (91 kg)

Career information
- High school: St. Bernard (Playa del Rey, California); St. John Bosco (Bellflower, California)
- College: USC (2026−present)

Career highlights
- McDonald's All-American (2026)

Christian Collins (born September 11, 2007) is an American college basketball player for the USC Trojans of the Big Ten Conference.

== Early life and high school ==
Collins initially attended St. Bernard High School, before transferring to St. John Bosco after his sophomore year.

Collins went from being unranked and relatively unknown to one of the top players in the 2026 class.

On March 18, 2026 Collins committed to USC over offers from Louisville, Kentucky and UCLA.

== Personal life ==
Collins's father, DeAngelo, played in the 2002 McDonald's All-American Game.
