= Maximo Adams =

American basketball player (born 2008)

No. 25 – North Carolina Tar Heels
- Position: Small forward
- Conference: Atlantic Coast Conference

Personal information
- Born: January 21, 2008 (age 18) San Pedro, California, U.S.
- Listed height: 6 ft 7 in (2.01 m)
- Listed weight: 220 lb (100 kg)

Career information
- High school: Sierra Canyon School (Los Angeles, California)
- College: North Carolina (2026–present)

Career highlights
- McDonald's All-American (2026)

Maximo Jarrard Adams (born January 21, 2008) is an American college basketball player for the North Carolina Tar Heels of the Atlantic Coast Conference (ACC).

Adams played high school basketball for Sierra Canyon School, where he helped the team to the 2026 state championship. At the close of his high school career, he was named a McDonald's All-American.

At the beginning of his senior season at Sierra Canyon, Adams committed to coach Hubert Davis and the North Carolina Tar Heels. Following the dismissal of Davis and hiring of Michael Malone as head coach, Adams reaffirmed his commitment to the Tar Heels.

Adams made his college debut in the Tar Heels' November 2, 2026 season opener against Western Carolina. In his second game, he recorded his first college double-double with 11 points and 11 rebounds in a win over Wofford.
