= Caleb Holt =

American basketball player (born 2007)

No. 3 – Arizona Wildcats
- Position: Shooting guard
- Conference: Big 12 Conference

Personal information
- Born: November 26, 2007 (age 18) Huntsville, Alabama, U.S.
- Listed height: 6 ft 5 in (1.96 m)
- Listed weight: 215 lb (98 kg)

Career information
- High school: Buckhorn (New Market, Alabama); Grayson (Loganville, Georgia); Prolific Prep (Fort Lauderdale, Florida)
- College: Arizona (2026–present)

Career highlights
- McDonald's All-American Co-MVP (2026); Nike Hoop Summit MVP (2026); Alabama Mr. Basketball (2024)
Medals
Men's basketball
Representing the United States
FIBA Under-19 World Cup
Gold medal – first place	2025 Switzerland	Team
FIBA Under-17 World Cup
Gold medal – first place	2024 Turkey	Team
FIBA Under-16 Americas Championship
Gold medal – first place	2023 Mexico	Team

Caleb Holt (born November 26, 2007) is an American college basketball player for the Arizona Wildcats of the Big 12 Conference. He played high school basketball for Prolific Prep in Fort Lauderdale, Florida and was a five-star recruit and one of the top players in the class of 2026.

== Early life ==
Holt was born on November 26, 2007. He grew up playing basketball and as an eighth grade student at Buckhorn Middle School, began playing as a starter for the varsity team at Buckhorn High School in New Market, Alabama, averaging 16 points and 8.5 rebounds per game. Then as a freshman the following year, he led Buckhorn to the 6A state title, being named the tournament MVP while scoring 32 points in the championship game. Holt was also named the Class 6A Player of the Year. As a sophomore, he averaged 20.2 points and 9.5 rebounds per game and was named the Alabama Mr. Basketball, the Class 6A Player of the Year, the Gatorade and MaxPreps Alabama Player of the Year and ASWA Super All-State. Holt led Buckhorn to a second state title and was named MVP of the state tournament.

Holt transferred to Grayson High School in 2024. He led Grayson to the state AAAAAA semifinal before a loss to Wheeler High School. He averaged 18.2 points and 8.7 rebounds and was named a MaxPreps Junior All-American, the Region Player of the Year, Metro Player of the Year and the Gwinnett Daily Post Boys Basketball Player of the Year. In June 2025, Holt transferred to Prolific Prep in Fort Lauderdale, Florida, for his senior season.

A five-star recruit, Holt is ranked one of the top 10 players nationally in the class of 2026, as well as the top player in Florida and the number two shooting guard. On March 10, 2026, Holt committed to play college basketball for the University of Arizona.

== International career ==
In 2023, Holt was a member of the United States national under-16 basketball team and won a gold medal at the 2023 FIBA Under-16 Americas Championship. In 2024, he was named to the U.S. national under-17 team for the 2024 FIBA Under-17 Basketball World Cup. He averaged 11.1 points and 3.3 rebounds while helping the U.S. win the gold medal. In June 2025, he was named to the national under-19 team for the 2025 FIBA Under-19 Basketball World Cup.
