= Nikola Bundalo =

American basketball player

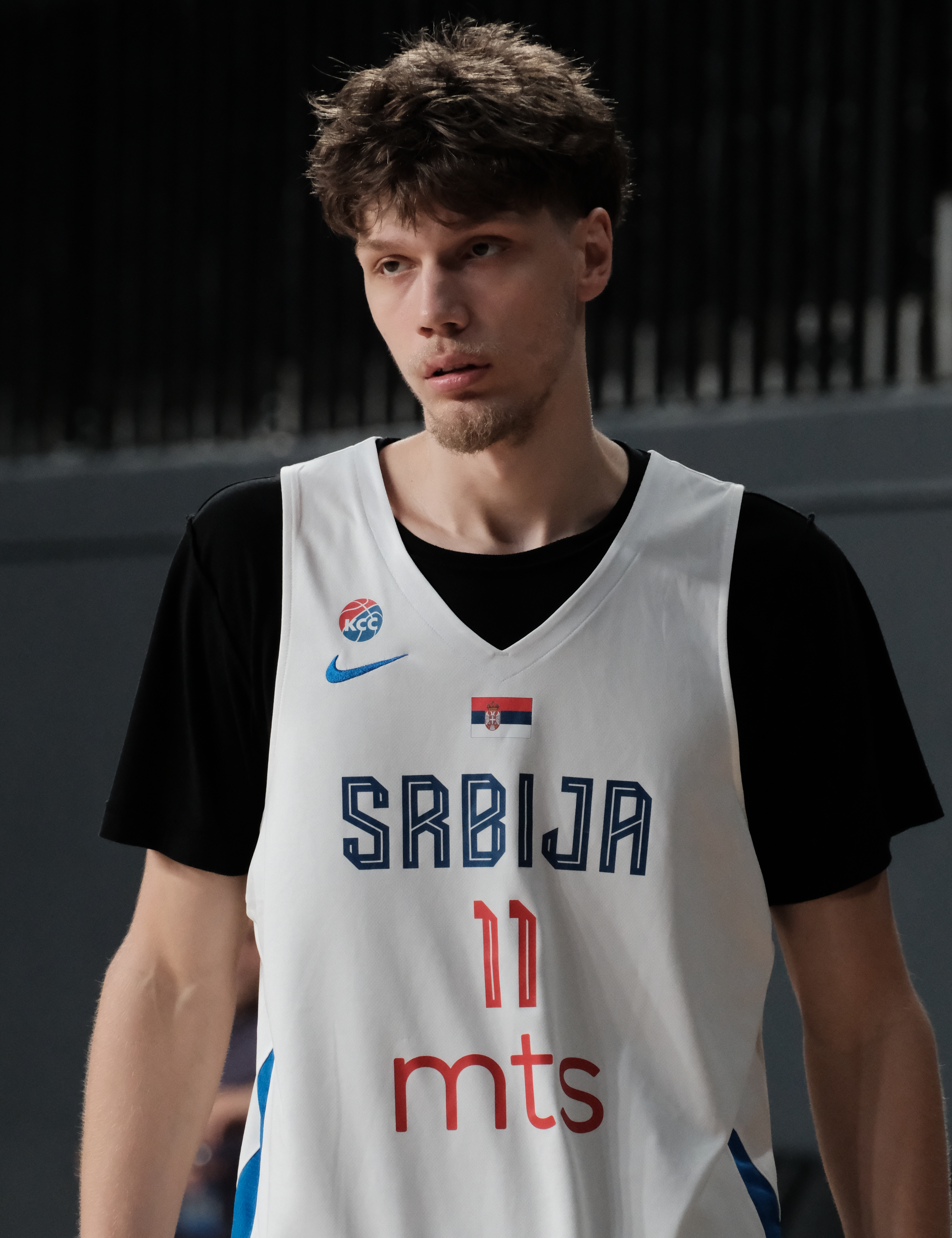
- Bundalo with the Serbia U20 national team

No. 11 – UT Arlington Mavericks
- Position: Power forward
- Conference: United Athletic Conference

Personal information
- Born: July 29, 2006 (age 20) Canton, Ohio, U.S.
- Listed height: 6 ft 10 in (2.08 m)
- Listed weight: 215 lb (98 kg)

Career information
- High school: Green (Green, Ohio); Western Reserve Academy (Hudson, Ohio); Prolific Prep (Napa, California)
- College: Ole Miss (2025–2026); UT Arlington (2026–present)

Career highlights
- McDonald's All-American (2025)
Medals
Men's basketball
Representing Serbia
FIBA U20 EuroBasket
| Silver medal – second place | 2026 Slovenia | Team |

Nikola Bundalo (Serbian Cyrillic: Никола Бундало; born July 29, 2006), nicknamed Niko, is a Serbian-American college basketball player for the UT Arlington Mavericks of the United Athletic Conference (UAC). He previously played for the Ole Miss Rebels.

== Early life and high school ==
Bundalo attended three different high schools, starting at Green High School and Western Reserve Academy in his native Ohio before finishing his high school career at Prolific Prep in Napa, California. As a sophomore he averaged 12.4 points and 6.0 rebounds per game and earned all-district honorable mention. Ahead of his senior year, Bundalo averaged 14.5 points and 5.8 rebounds in 12 games for the Wildcat Select on the Adidas 3SSB circuit. He was chosen to participate in the 2025 McDonald's All-American Boys Game after the end of his senior year.

=== Recruiting ===
Bundalo was a highly-rated recruit. He received dozens of scholarship offers from elite college basketball programs, but initially narrowed his choice to Michigan State, North Carolina, Ohio State, and UConn. He subsequently re-opened his recruiting, and announced his commitment to the University of Washington. Bundalo later de-committed from Washington on April 29, and ultimately committed to play for the University of Mississippi in May 2025.

College recruiting
| Name | Hometown | School | Height | Weight | Commit date |
|---|---|---|---|---|---|
| Niko Bundalo; PF | Uniontown, OH | Prolific Prep (CA) | 6 ft 10 in (2.08 m) | 205 lb (93 kg) | May 20, 2025 |
| Niko Bundalo; PF | Recruit ratings: Rivals: 247Sports: ESPN: (87) | | | | |
Overall recruit ranking: Rivals: 37 247Sports: 40 ESPN: 34
Note: In many cases, Scout, Rivals, 247Sports, On3, and ESPN may conflict in their listings of height and weight.; In these cases, the average was taken. ESPN grades are on a 100-point scale.; Sources: "Ole Miss 2025 Basketball Commitments". Rivals.; "2025 Ole Miss Rebels Recruiting Class". ESPN.; "2025 Team Ranking". Rivals.

== College career ==
=== Mississippi ===
Bundalo appeared in 11 games during his freshman season at Mississippi before announcing his intention to enter the transfer portal in April 2026.

=== UT Arlington ===
On August 11, 2026, it was announced that Bundalo would be transferring to UT Arlington.

== Personal life ==
Bundalo is of Serbian descent through his parents, who were refugees to the United States.

== Career statistics ==
Legend
| GP | Games played | GS | Games started | MPG | Minutes per game |
| FG% | Field goal percentage | 3P% | 3-point field goal percentage | FT% | Free throw percentage |
| RPG | Rebounds per game | APG | Assists per game | SPG | Steals per game |
| BPG | Blocks per game | PPG | Points per game | **Bold** | Career high |

=== College ===
| Year | Team | GP | GS | MPG | FG% | 3P% | FT% | RPG | APG | SPG | BPG | PPG |
|---|---|---|---|---|---|---|---|---|---|---|---|---|
| 2025–26 | Mississippi | 11 | 0 | 3.2 | .667 | .000 | .667 | .5 | 0 | .1 | .1 | .5 |
| Career | | 11 | 0 | 3.2 | .667 | .000 | .667 | .5 | 0 | .1 | .1 | .5 |
