= Toni Bryant =

American basketball player (born 2006)

No. 14 – Missouri Tigers
- Position: Power forward
- League: Southeastern Conference

Personal information
- Born: November 7, 2006 (age 20)
- Listed height: 6 ft 9 in (2.06 m)
- Listed weight: 215 lb (98 kg)

Career information
- High school: North Tampa Christian (Tampa, Florida); Zephyrhills Christian Academy (Pasadena Hills, Florida); Southeastern Prep (Maitland, Florida)
- College: Missouri (2026–present)

Career highlights
- McDonald's All-American (2026)

Toni Bryant (born November 7, 2006) is an American college basketball player for the Missouri Tigers of the Southeastern Conference.

== Early life ==
Bryant attended North Tampa Christian High School in Tampa, Florida for his first three years of high school before transferring to play at Zephyrhills Christian Academy and Southeastern Prep Academy for his senior year. As a sophomore, he averaged 19 points, 11 rebounds, and 8.7 blocks per game. During his junior season, Bryant averaged 21 points, 11.8 rebounds, 6.5 blocks, 2.1 assists, and 1.5 steals per game while shooting 66% from the field and 43% from three. He was invited to the 2026 McDonald's All-American Boys Game, where he recorded 14 points, five rebounds, and two blocks.

Bryant was rated as a five-star recruit, the 4th overall power forward, and the 14th best player in the class of 2026 by ESPN. He committed to play college basketball for the Missouri Tigers over offers from other schools such as NC State, Kansas, Florida State, Arizona, and North Carolina.
