= Prolific Prep =

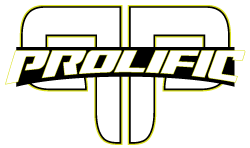
- Founded: 2014
- Location: Fort Lauderdale, Florida
- Team colors: Black & green
- Head coach: Ryan Bernardi
- Website: prolificprep.org

Prolific Prep is a prep basketball program. Founded in 2014 as a non-profit in Napa, California, the players attended high school at Napa Christian Academy. In 2025, the academy moved to Fort Lauderdale, Florida, where the players attend high school at Xceed Preparatory Academy.

At Prolific [Prep], it was basketball, basketball, basketball... [at Notre Dame] I get to enjoy time to myself... [At Notre Dame] practice is over at 5:30, so I get to go home; I can chill with my dog and do different stuff. I get a little break and have time to do my homework, you know. At Prolific Prep I get home at 9:30, shower, eat, and sleep.

— Tyran Stokes

== Notable people ==
=== Professional basketball players ===
==== NBA players ====
- Gary Trent Jr. of the Milwaukee Bucks
- Nate Williams of the Golden State Warriors
- Jalen Green of the Phoenix Suns
- Mouhamed Gueye of the Atlanta Hawks
- Adem Bona of the Philadelphia 76ers
- Yves Missi of the New Orleans Pelicans
- Emanuel Miller of the San Antonio Spurs
- Josh Jackson, formerly in several NBA teams
- Nathan Mensah, formerly of the Charlotte Hornets
- Darryn Peterson of the Utah Jazz
- AJ Dybantsa of the Washington Wizards

==== Other Leagues ====
- Coleman Hawkins of the Grand Rapids Gold (NBA G League)
- Jordan Brown of BC Šiauliai (Lithuanian Basketball League)
- Kuany Kuany of the Illawarra Hawks (Australian National Basketball League)
- Paul Scruggs of the Trefl Sopot (Polish Basketball League)

=== College basketball players ===
- Zoom Diallo of the Washington Huskies
- Tre White of the Kansas Jayhawks
- Nathan Bittle of the Oregon Ducks
- Abu Kigab of the Oregon Ducks and the Boise State Broncos
- Nimari Burnett of the Michigan Wolverines
- M. J. Rice at Cape Fear Community College
- Aiden Sherrell of the Alabama Crimson Tide
- Aden Holloway of the Alabama Crimson Tide
- Derrion Reid of the Oklahoma Sooners
- Dior Johnson of the Tarleton State Texans
- Yohan Traoré of the Butler Bulldogs
- Niko Bundalo of the Ole Miss Rebels
- Jordan Pope of the Texas Longhorns
- Mike Sharavjamts of the South Carolina Gamecocks

=== Prep basketball players ===
- Bruce Branch III
- Caleb Holt
- Tyran Stokes

=== Coaches ===
- Mark Phelps, an assistant coach at Loyola Marymount University
