= Julius Erving Award =

American college men's basketball award

- Awarded for: the nation's top male small forward in NCAA basketball
- Country: United States
- Presented by: Naismith Basketball Hall of Fame

History
- First award: 2015
- Most recent: AJ Dybantsa, BYU
- Website: Official website

The Julius Erving Small Forward of the Year Award is an annual basketball award given by the Naismith Basketball Hall of Fame to the top men's collegiate small forward. Following the success of the Bob Cousy Award which had been awarded since 2004, the award was one of four new awards (along with the Jerry West Award, Karl Malone Award, and Kareem Abdul-Jabbar Award) created as part of the inaugural College Basketball Awards show in 2015. It is named after Julius Erving, a Naismith Memorial Basketball Hall of Fame inductee who played the position. The inaugural winner was Stanley Johnson of Arizona. The school with the most all-time winners is Villanova, with three.

== Key ==
*	Awarded a national player of the year award that same season: Sporting News; Oscar Robertson Trophy; Associated Press; NABC; Naismith; Wooden
Player (X)	Denotes the number of times the player has been awarded the Julius Erving Award at that point

== Winners ==
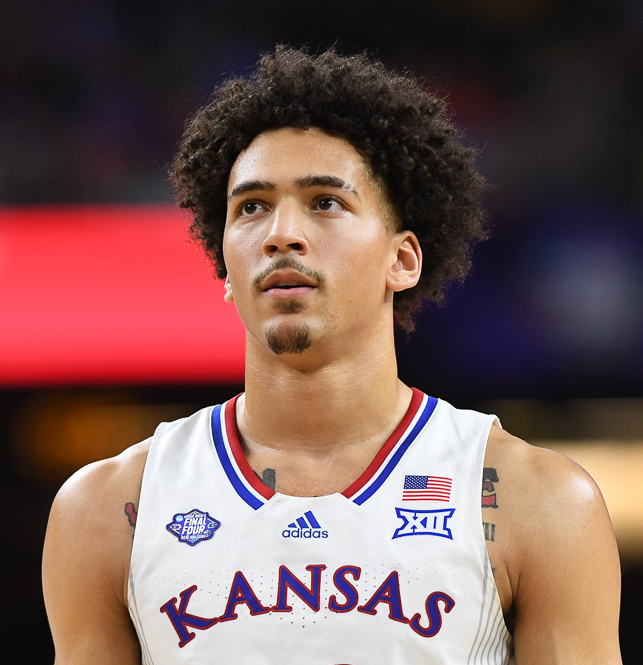
Jalen Wilson, Kansas, 2023

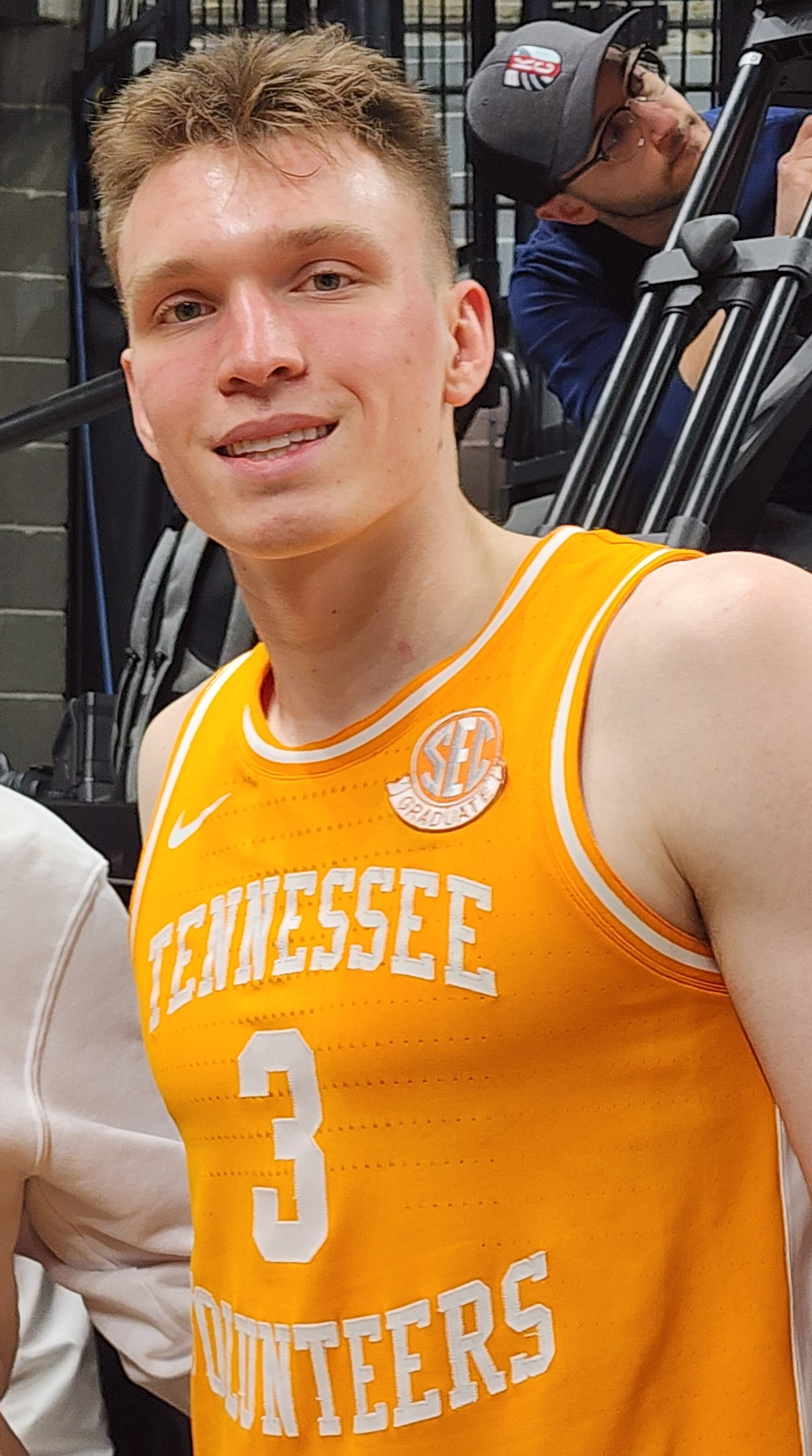
Dalton Knecht, Tennessee, 2024

Season	Player	School	Class	Reference
2014–15	Stanley Johnson	Arizona	Freshman	
2015–16	Denzel Valentine*	Michigan State	Senior	
2016–17	Josh Hart	Villanova	Senior	
2017–18	Mikal Bridges	Villanova	Junior	
2018–19	Rui Hachimura	Gonzaga	Junior	
2019–20	Saddiq Bey	Villanova	Sophomore	
2020–21	Corey Kispert	Gonzaga	Senior	
2021–22	Wendell Moore Jr.	Duke	Junior	
2022–23	Jalen Wilson	Kansas	Junior	
2023–24	Dalton Knecht	Tennessee	Graduate	
2024–25	Cooper Flagg*	Duke	Freshman	
2025–26	AJ Dybantsa	BYU	Freshman	
