= Caleb Gaskins =

American basketball player (born 2008)

No. 11 – Miami Hurricanes
- Position: Power forward
- Conference: Atlantic Coast Conference

Personal information
- Born: August 13, 2008 (age 18)
- Listed height: 6 ft 8 in (2.03 m)
- Listed weight: 221 lb (100 kg)

Career information
- High school: Montverde Academy (Montverde, Florida); Christopher Columbus (Westchester, Florida)
- College: Miami (Florida) (2026–present)

Career highlights
- McDonald's All-American (2026); Florida Mr. Basketball (2026)
Medals
Men's basketball
Representing United States
FIBA Under-18 AmeriCup
Silver medal – second place	2026 Mexico	Team

Caleb Gaskins (born August 13, 2008) is an American college basketball player for the Miami Hurricanes of the Atlantic Coast Conference (ACC). He was a five-star prospect in the class of 2026.

== Early life ==
Gaskins was born on August 13, 2008, and grew up in West Palm Beach, Florida. He first attended Montverde Academy in Florida where he played basketball and was teammates with Cooper Flagg. As a sophomore, he averaged 4.1 points and 2.4 rebounds while Montverde posted a perfect record of 35–0 with a victory at the Chipotle Nationals and the City of Palms Classic. He transferred to Christopher Columbus High School as a junior. In his first year at Christopher Columbus, Gaskins averaged 13.6 points and 6.3 rebounds and helped them to a record of 30–3 while winning the City of Palms Classic and the Class 7A state championship. He also helped Columbus to a national title.

Prior to his senior season, Gaskins averaged 15.7 points and 7.3 rebounds for the Nightrydas Elite in the Nike Elite Youth Basketball League (EYBL) and averaged 20.0 points and 10.2 rebounds at the Peach Jam tournament. In February 2026, he was selected for the McDonald's All-American Game.

A five-star recruit, Gaskins is ranked a consensus top-20 recruit nationally in the class of 2026. He committed to play college basketball for the Miami Hurricanes. He became the second-highest ranked Miami recruit in the 247Sports era.
