= Austin Goosby =

American basketball player (born 2007)

No. 10 – Texas Longhorns
- Position: Guard
- League: Southeastern Conference

Personal information
- Born: November 17, 2007 (age 18)
- Listed height: 6 ft 5 in (1.96 m)
- Listed weight: 205 lb (93 kg)

Career information
- High school: Melissa (Melissa, Texas); Dynamic Prep (Irving, Texas)
- College: Texas (2026–present)

Career highlights
- OTE champion (2026); McDonald's All-American (2026); Jordan Brand Classic (2026)

Austin Goosby (born November 17, 2007) is an American college basketball player for the Texas Longhorns of the Southeastern Conference.

== Early life ==
Goosby initially attended Melissa High School in Melissa, Texas, earning a starting spot on the varsity basketball team as a freshman. As a junior, he averaged 20 points, 8.1 rebounds, and 4.3 assists per game. Goosby was named the District 9-5A MVP and garnered first-team all-area honors from The Dallas Morning News. He also received Junior All-American honorable mention from MaxPreps. That offseason, Goosby had an impressive summer playing with Drive Nation on the Nike Elite Youth Basketball League (EYBL) circuit. He was also a standout at the NBPA Top 100 Camp in Rock Hill, South Carolina.

Ahead of his senior season, Goosby transferred to Dynamic Prep, a program based in Irving, Texas, and run by former NBA player Jermaine O'Neal. He also became teammates with Marcus Spears Jr. Goosby joined Dynamic Prep's Overtime Elite (OTE) squad, Team FaZe, and averaged 16.6 points, 5.1 assists, and 4.9 rebounds over 11 OTE regular-season appearances. He helped the team win its first-ever OTE championship after sweeping the Cold Hearts in the OTE Finals, recording 10 points and 11 assists in a 100–85 win in the deciding Game 4.

Goosby played a highly competitive national schedule with Dynamic Prep. He helped the team advance to the semifinals of the Chipotle Nationals. Goosby was selected to play in the McDonald's All-American Game, as well as the Jordan Brand Classic.

=== Recruiting ===
Goosby is a consensus top-35 prospect and one of the top recruits in the class of 2027. He is rated a five-star recruit by 247Sports and ESPN, and a four-star recruit by Rivals.com. According to the Austin American-Statesman, Goosby "[drew] praise as one of the top two-way wings in the nation for his class." He narrowed down his top four choices to Baylor, BYU, Duke, and Texas. On November 17, 2025, Goosby verbally committed to playing college basketball at Texas, staying in his home state and following his older brother onto campus.

== College career ==
Goosby was named a starter in his freshman year. He made his college debut as a starter in the first game of the 2026-27 season, recording seven points, seven rebounds, and eight assists in 27 minutes of play.

== Personal life ==
His father, Michael, played in the National Football League, while his brother, Trevor, plays football at Texas.
