= Jalen Green =

American basketball player (born 2002)

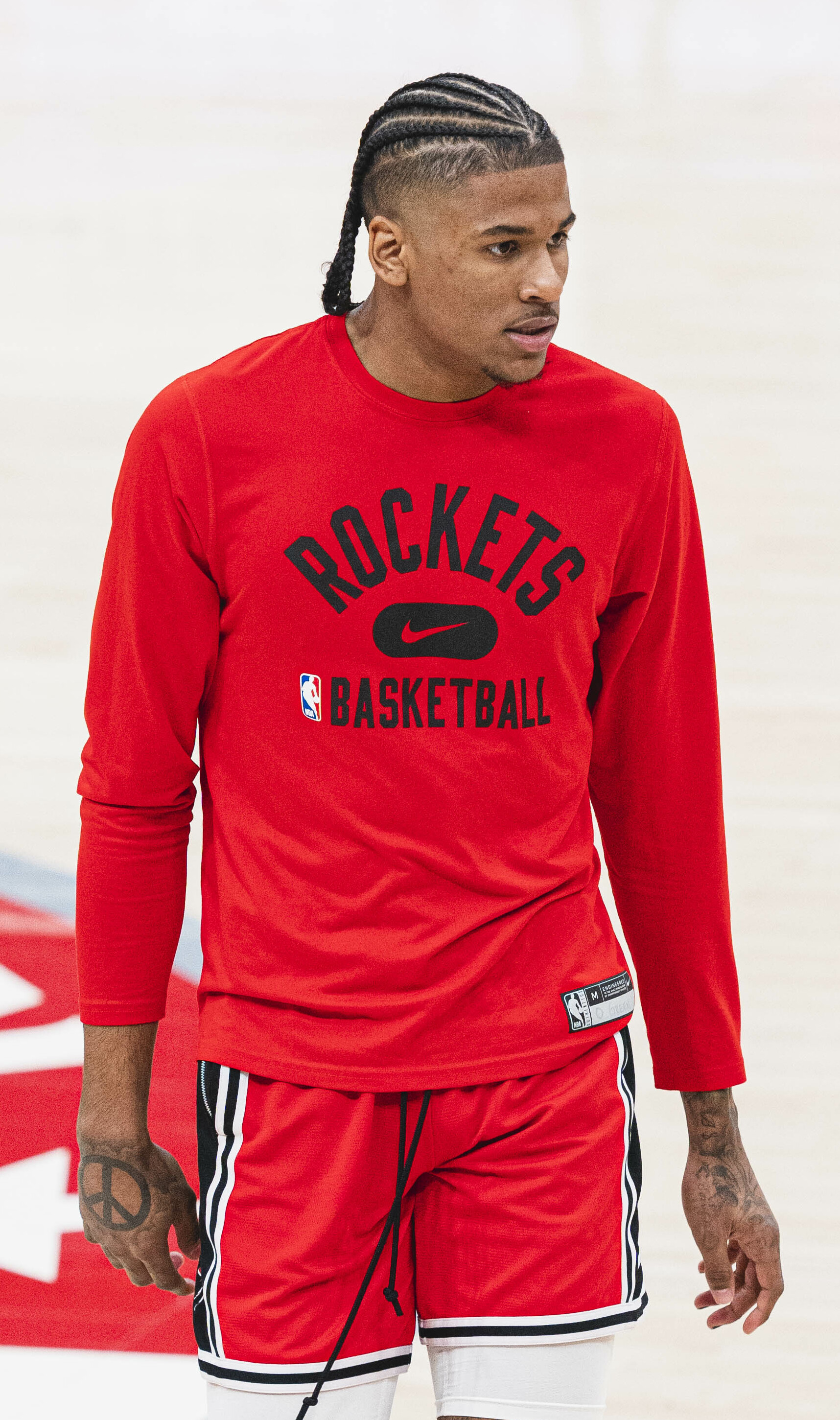
- Green with the Houston Rockets in 2022

No. 4 – Phoenix Suns
- Position: Shooting guard
- League: NBA

Personal information
- Born: February 9, 2002 (age 24) Merced, California, U.S.
- Listed height: 6 ft 4 in (1.93 m)
- Listed weight: 186 lb (84 kg)

Career information
- High school: San Joaquin Memorial (Fresno, California); Prolific Prep (Napa, California)
- NBA draft: 2021: 1st round, 2nd overall pick
- Drafted by: Houston Rockets
- Playing career: 2020–present

Career history
- 2020–2021: NBA G League Ignite
- 2021–2025: Houston Rockets
- 2025–present: Phoenix Suns

Career highlights
- NBA All-Rookie First Team (2022); McDonald's All-American (2020); FIBA Under-17 World Cup MVP (2018)
- Stats at NBA.com
- Stats at Basketball Reference
Medals
Men's basketball
Representing the United States
FIBA U19 World Cup
Gold medal – first place	2019 Greece	Team
FIBA U17 World Cup
Gold medal – first place	2018 Argentina	Team
FIBA Americas U16 Championship
Gold medal – first place	2017 Argentina	Team

Jalen Romande Green (born February 9, 2002) is an American professional basketball player for the Phoenix Suns of the National Basketball Association (NBA). He was a consensus five-star recruit and the best shooting guard in the 2020 class, with ESPN ranking him number one overall. He finished his high school career at Prolific Prep in Napa, California, and he chose to forgo college basketball to join the NBA G League Ignite team in its inaugural season. Green has won three gold medals with the United States at the junior level and was named Most Valuable Player (MVP) of the 2018 FIBA Under-17 World Cup. Green was selected by the Houston Rockets with the second overall pick in the 2021 NBA draft. He is the third player in the NBA of Filipino descent, following Raymond Townsend and Jordan Clarkson.

== Early life ==
Green was born on February 9, 2002, in Merced, California. He lived in Livingston, California, before moving to Fresno, California, in third grade. By sixth grade, he was playing Amateur Athletic Union (AAU) basketball and practicing for five hours each day.

== High school career ==
For his first three years of high school, Green played basketball for San Joaquin Memorial High School in Fresno. As a freshman, he was a full-time starter and averaged 18.1 points and nine rebounds per game. He led his team to a CIF Central Section Division II runner-up finish and the CIF Division II quarterfinals. He earned MaxPreps Freshman All-American second team and CIF Central Section rookie of the year honors. In his sophomore season, Green averaged 27.9 points and 7.7 rebounds per game, leading San Joaquin Memorial to a Central Section Division II title and the CIF Open Division playoffs. He was named MaxPreps National Sophomore of the Year and made the USA Today All-USA California second team.

As a junior, Green averaged 30.1 points, 7.8 rebounds, and 3.6 assists per game for San Joaquin Memorial. He won his second consecutive Central Division II championship. In the title game, Green surpassed the school career scoring record of 2,288 held by Roscoe Pondexter since 1971. He also helped his team reach the CIF Northern California Division I quarterfinals. Green was named USA Today All-USA California player of the year and appeared on the All-USA second team and MaxPreps All-American second team. For his senior season, he transferred to Prolific Prep in Napa, California. He helped his team win the Grind Session World championship. In March 2020, he shared Grind Session Most Valuable Player honors with Daishen Nix. Green averaged 31.5 points, 7.5 rebounds, and five assists per game, leading his team to a 31–3 record. He was named Sports Illustrated All-American player of the year and to the MaxPreps All-American first team. Green was selected to play in the McDonald's All-American Game, the Jordan Brand Classic, and the Nike Hoop Summit, but all three games were canceled due to the COVID-19 pandemic.

=== Recruiting ===
Green was a consensus five-star recruit and the number one shooting guard in the 2020 recruiting class, according to major recruiting services 247Sports, ESPN and Rivals. He was ranked as the top recruit in his class by ESPN. He received offers from many NCAA Division I basketball programs, including Arizona, Florida State, and USC before turning 15 years old. On April 16, 2020, Green announced that he would join the NBA G League, forgoing college basketball. He chose the G League over offers from Auburn, Oregon, and Memphis.

College recruiting
Name	Hometown	School	Height	Weight	Commit date
Jalen Green; SG	Fresno, CA	Prolific Prep (CA)	6 ft 7 in (2.01 m)	180 lb (82 kg)	—
Jalen Green; SG	Recruit ratings: Rivals: 247Sports: ESPN: (97)				
Overall recruit ranking: Rivals: 2 247Sports: 2 ESPN: 1
Note: In many cases, Scout, Rivals, 247Sports, On3, and ESPN may conflict in their listings of height and weight.; In these cases, the average was taken. ESPN grades are on a 100-point scale.; Sources: "2020 Team Ranking". Rivals.

== Professional career ==
=== NBA G League Ignite (2020–2021) ===
On April 16, 2020, Green signed a one-year, $500,000 contract with the NBA G League Ignite, a developmental team affiliated with the NBA G League. He became the first player to join the team. On March 8, 2021, Green recorded a season-high 30 points, seven assists, and five rebounds in a 127–102 loss to the Raptors 905 in the first round of the playoffs. He averaged 17.9 points, 4.1 rebounds, and 2.8 assists per game.

=== Houston Rockets (2021–2025) ===
==== 2021–22 season: All-Rookie First Team ====
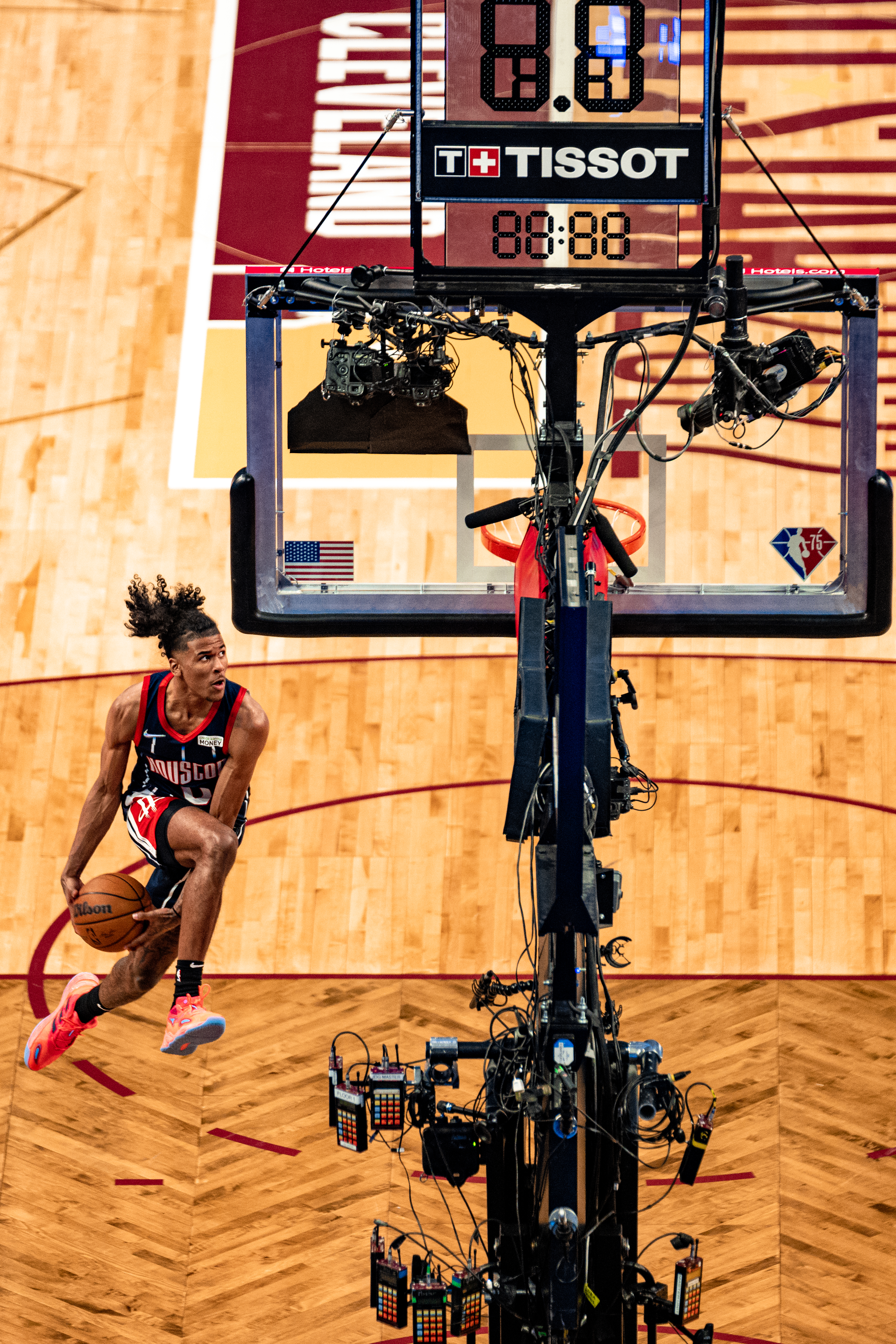
Green in the 2022 Slam Dunk Contest.

On July 29, 2021, Green was selected by the Houston Rockets second overall in the 2021 NBA draft, making him the first ever player being drafted out from the G-League, followed by former Ignite teammates Jonathan Kuminga and Isaiah Todd. Many thought the Rockets would take USC big-man Evan Mobley with the 2nd overall pick but Houston took Green to pair aside with Kevin Porter Jr. in the backcourt with James Harden being dealt during the season. On August 8, he made his summer league debut in a 84–76 win against the Cleveland Cavaliers where he posted 23 points, five rebounds, and two assists in 30 minutes. He made the All-Summer League Second Team after missing the last three of five games due to soreness on his right hamstring. He made his preseason debut on October 5 in a 125–119 win against the Washington Wizards with 12 points, six rebounds, and two assists. On October 20, Green made his NBA debut, putting up nine points, four rebounds, and four assists in a 124–106 loss to the Minnesota Timberwolves. On October 24, Green put up 30 points, with eight three-pointers made, in a 107–97 loss to the Boston Celtics, becoming the first rookie to put up at least 30 points and eight threes in a game in Rockets history. On October 28, Green and Jordan Clarkson became the first two players of Filipino descent to play in the same NBA game in time for the Rockets' Filipino Heritage Night celebration. Unfortunately for Green, he started out his rookie season suffering with a hamstring injury on his lower left leg after a home game win against the Chicago Bulls and was sidelined from the rotation for a time. After missing 14-games in a month from his hamstring injury, Green returned to the starting line up on December 24, scoring 20 points while shooting 6-for-9 from the three point line in a road loss to the Indiana Pacers.

On February 19, 2022, Green participated in the Slam Dunk Contest, finishing in third place. On March 9, Green scored 32 points along with three rebounds, three assists, and one blocked shot in 38 minutes which marked his second 30-point game in a 130–139 overtime win against the Los Angeles Lakers. On March 28, Green scored his third 30-point game along with four rebounds and assists in a 123–120 loss against the San Antonio Spurs. He joined with Allen Iverson as the only NBA rookie to score 30-plus points in five straight games since 1997. In his final game as a rookie, Green scored a then-career high with 41 points in a 130–114 loss to the Atlanta Hawks, which was the first 40-point game by a Rockets rookie since Hakeem Olajuwon. At the end of the regular season, he was named Rookie of the Month for March and April. He was selected to the NBA All-Rookie First Team with averages of 17.3 points, 3.4 rebounds, and 2.6 assists.

==== 2022–23 season: Career-high in scoring ====
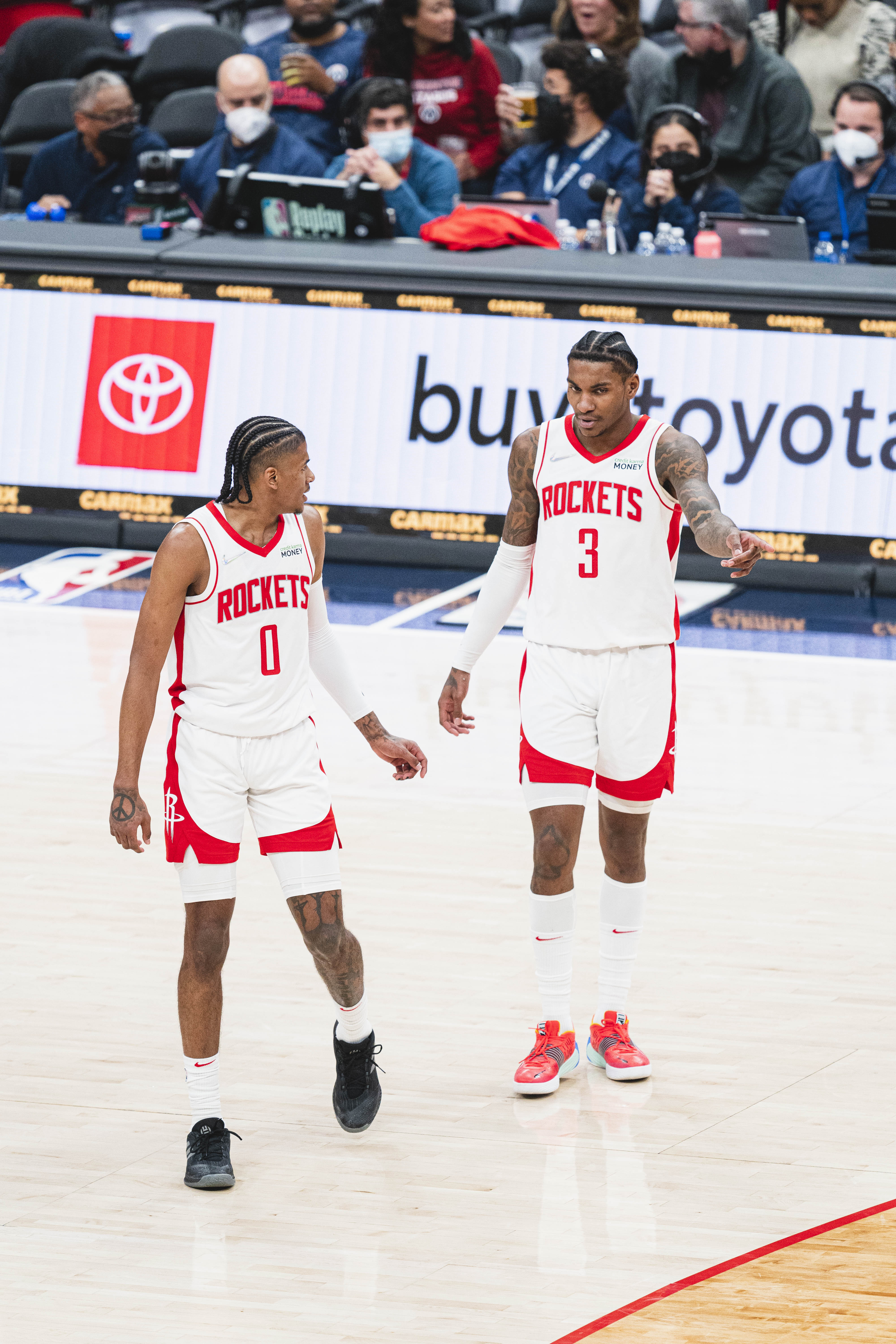
Green with Kevin Porter Jr. in 2022.

Prior to the 2022–23 season, Green changed his jersey number from 0 to 4. Green was unable to wear number 4 during his rookie season since Danuel House, who was still a teammate with Green, refused to exchange number jerseys with him since the number was of significance to him before being waived by the Rockets on December 17, 2021. In his second game of the season, Green played 35 minutes with a record of 33 points with four threes, five rebounds, two assists, and a steal in a 129–122 loss to the Memphis Grizzlies. On November 7, 2022, scored 34 points in a win against the Orlando Magic, making him the sixth guard in NBA history to score at least 30 points ten or more times before turning 21, joining other elite guards in Luka Dončić, Devin Booker, Anthony Edwards, LaMelo Ball, and Kyrie Irving. On November 26, he secured a career-high nine assists along with 28 points and three rebounds in a 118–105 win against the Oklahoma City Thunder. In December 2, Green logged 20 points in the third quarter leading with 30 points in a 122–121 comeback game win against the Phoenix Suns.

On January 15, 2023, the NBA suspended Green along with teammate Jae'Sean Tate for one game without pay for leaving the bench area during an altercation between the Rockets and the Sacramento Kings two days earlier. On January 18, Green tied a then-career high of 41 points with seven assists and five rebounds in a 121–117 loss against the Charlotte Hornets. On January 23, he surpassed his career high with 42 points along with four rebounds and four assists in a 119–114 win against the Minnesota Timberwolves. He became the only sixth player at 20 or younger to have recorded at least three 40-point games. On February 8, Green scored 41 points along with two assists and rebounds, securing his fourth game of 40 or more points before turning 21, tied for the third most in NBA history. He achieved this a day before his 21st birthday.

==== 2023–24 season: Failed trade ====
Green was nearly traded to the Brooklyn Nets for Mikal Bridges. The deal would have sent Green and Brooklyn's picks back from the James Harden trade to the Nets. On January 24, 2024, Green and his teammate Alperen Şengün became the first duo in NBA history to score 30-plus points and 10-plus rebounds at 21 years or younger in a 135–119 win against the Los Angeles Lakers. On March 19, 2024, Green put up a career-high 42 points, along with 10 rebounds and three assists, in a 137–114 win over the Washington Wizards.

==== 2024–25 season: Playoff debut ====
On October 21, 2024, Green and the Rockets agreed to a three–year, $106 million contract extension. On November 27, 2024, Green put up 41 points in a 122–115 overtime win over the Philadelphia 76ers.

On January 13, 2025, Green matched his career high with 42 points on 72.2% shooting from the field in a home game win against the Memphis Grizzlies. He joined Hakeem Olajuwon as the only two players in Rockets history to score 40+ points with at least 70% from the field. Green started all 82 games for Houston during the 2024–25 NBA season, averaging 21 points, 4.6 rebounds, and 3.4 assists.

In Game 2 of the Rockets' first-round playoff series against the Golden State Warriors, Green scored 38 points, leading the Rockets to a 109–94 victory. He tied the Rockets franchise record for most three-pointers made in a playoff game with eight, matching performances by Chris Paul (vs. Utah, May 8, 2018) and Matt Maloney (at Seattle, May 11, 1997). Despite this standout game, Green faced criticism throughout the playoffs, averaging only 13.3 points per game while shooting 37% from the field and less than 30% from three-point range. The Rockets lost the series in Game 7.

=== Phoenix Suns (2025–present) ===
On July 6, 2025, Green, alongside Dillon Brooks, Rasheer Fleming, and Khaman Maluach, was traded to the Phoenix Suns via a seven-team trade that sent Kevin Durant to the Rockets. He made 32 appearances (including 27 starts) for the Suns during the 2025–26 NBA season, averaging 17.8 points, 3.6 rebounds, and 2.8 assists. On April 17, 2026, during Phoenix's play-in contest against the Golden State Warriors, Green recorded 36 points and eight three-pointers en route to a 111–96 victory. The win helped the Suns secure the eighth seed in the playoffs, marking a turnaround after a disappointing 2024–25 season that saw them miss the playoffs.

The Suns faced the reigning champion and top-seeded Oklahoma City Thunder during their first round playoff series. Green made his Suns playoff debut on April 19, putting up 17 points and five assists in a 119–84 Game 1 loss. On April 25, he recorded 26 points, five rebounds, and six assists in a 121–109 Game 3 loss. The Suns would end up getting swept by the Thunder in four games.

== National team career ==
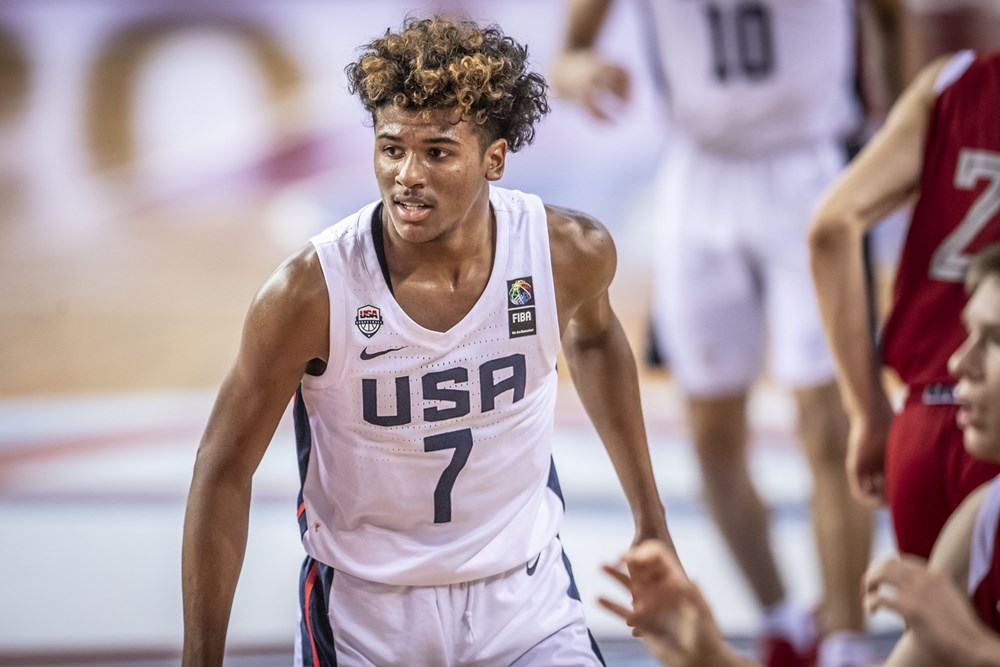
Green played with United States men's national under-19 basketball team at FIBA Under-19 Basketball World Cup in Greece.

Green represents the United States internationally but has also shown interest in playing for the Philippines in the future due to his partial Filipino background. He made his national team debut for the United States at the 2017 FIBA Under-16 Americas Championship in Formosa, Argentina. In five games, he averaged 9.8 points, two rebounds, and one steal per game, helping his team win the gold medal. He was named MVP of the 2018 FIBA Under-17 Basketball World Cup in Argentina after averaging a team-high 15.7 points, 2.3 rebounds, and 1.7 assists per game and winning the gold medal. Green won another gold medal with the United States at the 2019 FIBA Under-19 Basketball World Cup in Heraklion, Greece. As the youngest member of his team, he averaged 10.1 points, 2.1 rebounds, and 1.7 steals per game.

== Player profile ==
Standing at 6 feet 4 inches (1.93 meters) with a wingspan of 6 feet 7.5 inches (2.02 meters) and standing reach of 8 feet 5 inches (2.57 meters), Green primarily plays as a shooting guard. He is known for his elite athleticism, handling skills, and versatile scoring abilities that makes him an on-and off-the-ball threat in a half-court setting and in transition. He has drawn comparisons to Zach LaVine, Ray Allen, Kelly Oubre Jr., Bradley Beal, Clyde Drexler, and Kobe Bryant. Green utilizes an "explosive" first step that allows him to attack the rim and speed past on-ball defenders.

== Career statistics ==
Legend
GP	Games played	GS	Games started	MPG	Minutes per game
FG%	Field goal percentage	3P%	3-point field goal percentage	FT%	Free throw percentage
RPG	Rebounds per game	APG	Assists per game	SPG	Steals per game
BPG	Blocks per game	PPG	Points per game	**Bold**	Career high
*	Led the league

=== NBA ===
==== Regular season ====
Year	Team	GP	GS	MPG	FG%	3P%	FT%	RPG	APG	SPG	BPG	PPG
2021–22	Houston	67	67	31.9	**.426**	.343	.797	3.4	2.6	.7	**.3**	17.3
2022–23	Houston	76	76	**34.2**	.416	.338	.786	3.7	**3.7**	.8	.2	**22.1**
2023–24	Houston	**82**	**82***	31.7	.423	.332	.804	**5.2**	3.5	.8	**.3**	19.6
2024–25	Houston	**82***	**82***	32.9	.423	**.354**	**.813**	4.6	3.4	.9	**.3**	21.0
2025–26	Phoenix	32	27	25.9	.422	.313	.747	3.6	2.8	**1.1**	**.3**	17.8
Career		339	334	32.1	.422	.339	.796	4.2	3.3	.8	.3	19.9

==== Playoffs ====
Year	Team	GP	GS	MPG	FG%	3P%	FT%	RPG	APG	SPG	BPG	PPG
2025	Houston	**7**	**7**	31.3	.372	**.295**	.667	**5.4**	2.9	.6	**.3**	13.3
2026	Phoenix	4	4	**37.8**	**.386**	.206	**.800**	5.3	**3.5**	**2.0**	**.3**	**21.8**
Career		11	11	33.6	.379	.256	.727	5.4	3.1	1.1	.3	16.4

== Personal life ==
Green is of partial Filipino descent through his mother, Bree Purganan, whose paternal grandfather is Filipino.

Green is the middle child in his family, with an older sister named Raquel and a younger sister named Jurnee.

Green is currently dating actress and fashion designer Draya Michele. Their daughter was born on May 12, 2024.
