= AJ Dybantsa =

American basketball player (born 2007)

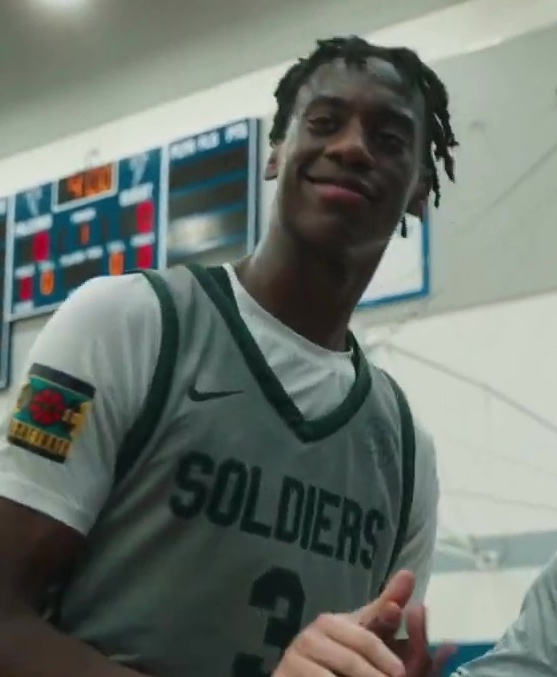
- Dybantsa in the Nike EYBL in 2024

No. 4 – Washington Wizards
- Position: Small forward
- League: NBA

Personal information
- Born: January 29, 2007 (age 19) Boston, Massachusetts, U.S.
- Listed height: 6 ft 9 in (2.06 m)
- Listed weight: 210 lb (95 kg)

Career information
- High school: Saint Sebastian's (Needham, Massachusetts); Prolific Prep (Napa, California); Utah Prep (Hurricane, Utah)
- College: BYU (2025–2026)
- NBA draft: 2026: 1st round, 1st overall pick
- Drafted by: Washington Wizards
- Playing career: 2026–present

Career history
- 2026–present: Washington Wizards

Career highlights
- Consensus first-team All-American (2026); Julius Erving Award (2026); Big 12 Freshman of the Year (2026); NCAA scoring champion (2026); McDonald's All-American (2025); 2× Nike Hoop Summit (2024, 2025); FIBA Under-19 World Cup MVP (2025)
- Stats at NBA.com
- Stats at Basketball Reference
Medals
Men's basketball
Representing the United States
FIBA U19 World Cup
Gold medal – first place	2025 Switzerland	Team
FIBA U17 World Cup
Gold medal – first place	2024 Turkey	Team
FIBA Under-16 Americas Championship
Gold medal – first place	2023 Mérida	Team

Anicet Francois Dybantsa Jr. (/ˌɑːniˈseɪ/ ah-nee-SAY, /diːˈbɑːntsɑː/ dee-BAHNT-sah; born January 29, 2007) is an American professional basketball player for the Washington Wizards of the National Basketball Association (NBA). Dybantsa played one year of college basketball for the BYU Cougars, earning the Julius Erving Award after leading the nation in scoring for the 2025–26 season, prior to being selected first overall by the Wizards in the 2026 NBA draft. He is also a member of the U.S. national under-19 team, earning a gold medal at the 2025 FIBA Under-19 Basketball World Cup and tournament MVP honors.

== Early life ==
Anicet Francois Dybantsa Jr. was born on January 29, 2007, in Boston, Massachusetts, and grew up in Brockton where he attended Saint Sebastian's School. His father Ace was born in the Republic of the Congo and later moved to Grigny, France, while his mother Chelsea is from Jamaica.

He was named the 2023 Massachusetts Boys' Basketball Gatorade Player of the Year following his freshman season after averaging 19.1 points, 9.6 rebounds, 2.9 assists and 2.5 blocks per game. Dybantsa helped lead Saint Sebastian's to the NEPSAC Class A state championship, but lost to Milton Academy 77–76.

Dybantsa transferred to Prolific Prep in Napa, California, at the end of his freshman year, where he teamed up with the second-ranked player of the 2026 class, Tyran Stokes. In July 2023, Dybantsa led the Nike Peach Jam in scoring with 25.8 points per game as a member of Expressions Elite, an Amateur Athletic Union team from Boston.

Dybantsa concluded his high school basketball career playing for Utah Prep Academy in Hurricane, Utah, during the 2024–25 season.

=== Recruiting ===
Dybantsa was named the number one NBA prospect in the 2026 class by ESPN following his high school freshman season, with his first NCAA Division I college offer coming from Boston College. Additional schools that offered him a scholarship and/or were under consideration include Alabama, Arkansas, Auburn, Baylor, BYU, UConn, Duke, Georgia Tech, Georgetown, Kentucky, North Carolina, Providence, USC, Utah and Washington. In July 2023, On3.com named Dybantsa the top high school player in the country regardless of class. In October 2023, Dybantsa announced that he had reclassified to the 2025 class.

College recruiting
Name	Hometown	School	Height	Weight	Commit date
AJ Dybantsa; SF	Brockton, MA	Utah Prep	6 ft 9 in (2.06 m)	203 lb (92 kg)	Dec 10, 2024
AJ Dybantsa; SF	Recruit ratings: Rivals: 247Sports: On3: ESPN:				
Overall recruit ranking: Rivals: 1 247Sports: 2 On3: 1 ESPN: 1
Note: In many cases, Scout, Rivals, 247Sports, On3, and ESPN may conflict in their listings of height and weight.; In these cases, the average was taken. ESPN grades are on a 100-point scale.; Sources: "2025 BYU Basketball Commitment List". Rivals.; "BYU Cougars". ESPN.; "2025 Team Ranking". Rivals.; "BYU 2025 Basketball Commits". 247Sports.; "2025 BYU Cougars Basketball Commits". On3.

== College career ==
On December 10, 2024, Dybantsa announced on First Take that he would be committing to BYU as he wanted to play basketball without off-court distractions. He became the highest-ranked committed recruit to join BYU in program history.

On January 24, 2026, Dybantsa passed Danny Ainge for the most points posted by a BYU freshman in a game, recording 43 points during a 91–78 victory over Utah. On April 22, Dybantsa declared for the 2026 NBA draft, in which he was projected as a potential first overall pick.

== Professional career ==
On June 23, 2026, Dybantsa was selected first overall by the Washington Wizards in the 2026 NBA draft. He signed a four-year rookie contract worth $66.91 million on July 2. During the 2026 preseason, Dybantsa averaged 12.8 points, 3.8 rebounds, 1.8 assists and 1.5 steals over four games. In the Wizards' final preseason game, he injured his ankle as he landed after a mid-range jump shot and missed the first four regular-season games.

On October 28, Dybantsa made his NBA regular-season debut, putting up 19 points in a 121–111 loss to the Cleveland Cavaliers. On November 18, Dybantsa put up a career-high 23 points and a career-high 12 rebounds, along with two assists, and one steal in a 103–99 win over the Toronto Raptors.

== National team career ==
Dybantsa won a gold medal while representing the United States at the 2023 FIBA Under-16 Americas Championship in Mérida, Mexico. He scored 12 points in the gold medal game and averaged 13.9 points for the tournament. The following year, he helped the United States win the title at the 2024 FIBA U17 World Cup in Turkey, where he averaged 14.1 points, 3.9 rebounds and 4.1 assists during the competition. In 2025, Dybantsa was named MVP of the 2025 FIBA U19 World Cup, after helping the United States win their ninth title at the event. He averaged 14.3 points, 4.1 rebounds and 2.3 assists during the tournament.

== Personal life ==
Dybantsa's favorite athlete is French soccer player Michael Olise.

== Career statistics ==
Legend
GP	Games played	GS	Games started	MPG	Minutes per game
FG%	Field goal percentage	3P%	3-point field goal percentage	FT%	Free throw percentage
RPG	Rebounds per game	APG	Assists per game	SPG	Steals per game
BPG	Blocks per game	PPG	Points per game	**Bold**	Career high
*	Led the league

=== College ===
Year	Team	GP	GS	MPG	FG%	3P%	FT%	RPG	APG	SPG	BPG	PPG
2025–26	BYU	35	35	34.8	.510	.331	.774	6.8	3.7	1.1	.3	25.5*
