= Jason Crowe Jr. =

American basketball player (born 2008)

No. 5 – Missouri Tigers
- Position: Point guard
- Conference: Southeastern Conference

Personal information
- Born: July 18, 2008 (age 18)
- Listed height: 6 ft 4 in (1.93 m)
- Listed weight: 190 lb (86 kg)

Career information
- High school: Lynwood (Lynwood, California); Inglewood (Inglewood, California)
- College: Missouri (2026−present)

Career highlights
- McDonald's All-American Co-MVP (2026); Jordan Brand Classic (2026); Nike Hoop Summit (2026); California Mr. Basketball (2026)

Jason Crowe Jr. (born July 18, 2008) is an American college basketball player for the Missouri Tigers of the Southeastern Conference (SEC). He is a five-star prospect and one of the top recruits in the class of 2026. Crowe is the all-time leading scorer in California state history.

== Early life ==
Crowe, the son of former professional basketball player Jason Crowe, grew up in Lynwood, California. He grew up playing basketball and first attended Lynwood High School, where he became the MaxPreps National Freshman of the Year in 2023. That season, he averaged 34 points per game, breaking the state freshman scoring record, and helping Lynwood win the state Division V championship, the school's first-ever CIF title. By his sophomore season, he surpassed 2,000 career points scored. Crowe was coached by his father at Lynwood and both moved to Inglewood High School for Crowe's junior season. He averaged 35.3 points and 6.1 assists during the 2024–25 season with Inglewood.

A five-star recruit, Crowe is ranked the top point guard prospect and a top-five recruit nationally in the class of 2026. He committed to play college basketball for the Missouri Tigers.

As a senior in 2025–26, Crowe scored 1,387 points (while missing 3 games), which was the second-highest single-season total in California state history. For the season, he averaged 43.3 points, 4.4 rebounds, 5.8 assists and 3.5 steals per game. Crowe finished his high school career with a California state record of 4,718 total points scored. He surpassed 3,659 points set by Tounde Yessoufou the season before (who broke the 21-year state record).

== International career ==
Crowe has trained with the U.S. national under-16, under-17 and under-19 basketball teams.
