= Kuany Kuany (basketball, born 2000) =

South Sudanese basketball player

No. 12 – Maroussi
- Position: Power forward
- League: GBL

Personal information
- Born: 27 March 2000 (age 26) Kakuma, Kenya
- Listed height: 2.06 m (6 ft 9 in)
- Listed weight: 91 kg (201 lb)

Career information
- High school: Victory Rock Prep (Sarasota, Florida); Prolific Prep (Napa, California)
- College: California (2019–2023); VCU (2023–2024)
- NBA draft: 2024: undrafted
- Playing career: 2024–present

Career history
- 2024–2025: Illawarra Hawks
- 2025: Townsville Heat
- 2025–2026: Anorthosis Famagusta
- 2026: FUS Rabat
- 2026: Waverley Falcons
- 2026–present: Maroussi

Career highlights
- NBL champion (2025)

Kuany Atem Kuany (born 27 March 2000) is a South Sudanese-Australian professional basketball player for Maroussi of the Greek Basketball League (GBL). He played college basketball for the VCU Rams of the Atlantic 10 Conference. Standing at 2.06 m (6 ft 9 in), Kuany plays the power forward position.

== Early life ==
Kuany was born in Kakuma, Kenya. He spent time between South Sudan and Kenya before his family moved to Melbourne, Australia, when he was 6 years old. He started playing basketball at age 11 and moved to the United States on his own at age 15 to pursue basketball.

== High school career ==
Kuany attended Victory Rock Prep and Prolific Prep. In May 2019, Kuany committed to the California Golden Bears. He chose the Golden Bears over Washington State and Nevada.

== College career ==
Kuany played for the California Golden Bears between 2019 and 2023. He missed a game on 9 January 2021 due to a concussion. After graduating with his undergraduate degree in sociology, Kuany decided to enter his name in the transfer portal to use his final year of eligibility.

On 22 May 2023, Kuany joined the VCU Rams men's basketball team. In 38 games with the Rams during the 2023–24 season, he made 37 starts and averaged 5.7 points and 2.4 rebounds in 16.8 minutes per game.

== Professional career ==
Kuany joined the Illawarra Hawks of the Australian National Basketball League (NBL) as a training player for the 2024–25 season. He was a member of the Hawks' NBL championship-winning team in March 2025, playing the final 29 seconds of game five of the grand final series.

Kuany joined the Townsville Heat of the NBL1 North for the 2025 NBL1 season. In 13 games, he averaged 19.2 points, 9.5 rebounds, 1.3 assists and 1.4 steals per game.

For the 2025–26 season, Kuany moved to Cyprus to play for Anorthosis Famagusta of the Cyprus Basketball Division A. In 18 league games, he averaged 15.8 points, 5.2 rebounds and 1.0 steals per game. He also averaged 10.1 points, 6.4 rebounds and 1.4 blocks in seven FIBA Europe Cup games. In April 2026, he joined Moroccan team FUS Rabat of the Basketball Africa League for the 2026 BAL season. In seven BAL games, he averaged 14.6 points, 7.6 rebounds and 1.4 assists per game.

In June 2026, Kuany joined the Waverley Falcons of the NBL1 South, playing three games during the 2026 NBL1 season.

In July 2026, Kuany joined the Milwaukee Bucks for the 2026 NBA Summer League. He appeared in three games.

In September 2026, Kuany signed with Maroussi of the Greek Basketball League (GBL).

== National team ==
In November 2024, Kuany joined the South Sudan national team for the AfroBasket 2025 qualifiers. In November 2025, he played for South Sudan during a window of 2027 FIBA Basketball World Cup African qualifiers.

== Career statistics ==
Legend
GP	Games played	GS	Games started	MPG	Minutes per game
FG%	Field goal percentage	3P%	3-point field goal percentage	FT%	Free throw percentage
RPG	Rebounds per game	APG	Assists per game	SPG	Steals per game
BPG	Blocks per game	PPG	Points per game	**Bold**	Career high

=== College ===
Year	Team	GP	GS	MPG	FG%	3P%	FT%	RPG	APG	SPG	BPG	PPG
2019–20	California	28	2	6.6	.389	.357	.667	1.1	.3	.1	.1	2.2
2020–21	California	26	3	9.3	.429	.200	.647	1.3	.4	.0	.2	2.3
2021–22	California	30	16	17.0	.413	.319	.769	2.4	.5	**.6**	**.5**	4.8
2022–23	California	32	26	**25.3**	.359	.298	.823	**3.9**	**.8**	**.6**	.4	**9.0**
2023–24	VCU	**38**	**37**	16.8	**.447**	**.380**	**.882**	2.4	.5	.5	.4	5.7
Career		154	84	15.5	.400	.325	.781	2.3	.5	.4	.4	5.0
