= Maël Lebrun =

French basketball player

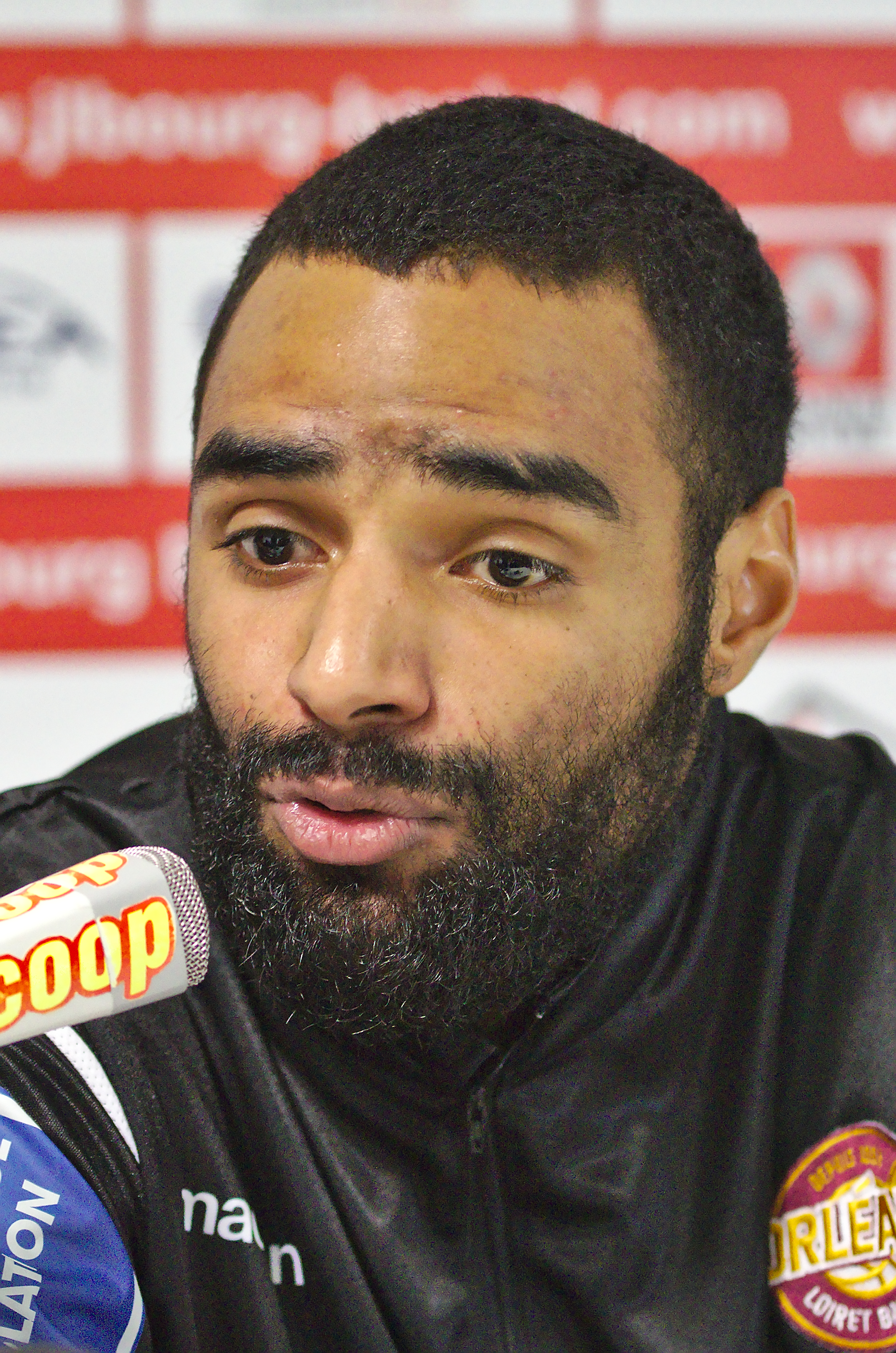
- Maël Lebrun in 2015

No. 8 – STB Le Havre
- Position: Shooting guard / small forward
- League: LNB Pro A

Personal information
- Born: April 17, 1991 (age 35) Nice, France
- Listed height: 1.98 m (6 ft 6 in)
- Listed weight: 83 kg (183 lb)

Career information
- NBA draft: 2013: undrafted
- Playing career: 2009–present

Career history
- 2009–2015: Orléans Loiret Basket
- 2015–present: STB Le Havre
Medals
Men's basketball
Representing France
FIBA Europe Under-18 Championship
Silver medal – second place	2009 France	U-18 Team

Maël Lebrun (born April 17, 1991) is a French professional basketball player who plays for French Pro A league club STB Le Havre.
