= Columbus High School =

Columbus High School can refer to a number of high schools in the United States:

- Columbus High School (Downey, California), a public secondary high school in California
- Columbus High School (Columbus, Georgia), a liberal arts magnet school in Georgia
- Columbus High School (Waterloo, Iowa), a Catholic secondary school in Iowa
- Columbus High School (Columbus, Kansas), a public secondary high school in Kansas
- Columbus High School (Columbus, Mississippi), a public secondary high school in Mississippi
- Columbus High School (Columbus, Montana) in Columbus, Montana
- Columbus High School (Columbus, Nebraska), a public secondary high school in Columbus, Nebraska
- Columbus High School (Lake View, South Carolina), a public secondary high school in South Carolina
- Columbus High School (Texas) in Columbus, Texas
- Category:High schools in Columbus, Ohio

== Similarly named ==
- Christopher Columbus High School (Miami-Dade County, Florida), a Catholic secondary school
- Christopher Columbus High School (Bronx), a public secondary school
- Columbus Alternative High School in Columbus, Ohio
- Columbus Catholic High School (Marshfield, Wisconsin)
- Columbus Community High School in Columbus Junction, Iowa
- Columbus East High School and Columbus North High School (formerly Columbus High School until 1973) in Columbus, Indiana
- Columbus Grove High School in Columbus Grove, Ohio
- Columbus Senior High School, a public secondary high school in Columbus, Wisconsin
- East Columbus High School in Lake Waccamaw, North Carolina
- South Columbus High School in Tabor City, North Carolina
- West Columbus High School in Cerro Gordo, North Carolina
