= Bruce Branch III =

American basketball player (born 2008)

No. 3 – BYU Cougars
- Position: Small forward
- Conference: Big 12 Conference

Personal information
- Born: October 24, 2008 (age 18)
- Listed height: 6 ft 8 in (2.03 m)
- Listed weight: 190 lb (86 kg)

Career information
- High school: Perry (Gilbert, Arizona); Prolific Prep (Fort Lauderdale, Florida)
- College: BYU (2026−present)

Career highlights
- McDonald's All-American (2026)
Medals
Men's basketball
Representing United States
FIBA Under-18 AmeriCup
Silver medal – second place	2026 Mexico	Team

Bruce Branch III (born October 24, 2008) is an American college basketball player for the BYU Cougars of the Big 12 Conference. He is a five-star prospect in the class of 2026, after reclassifying from 2027.

== Early life ==
Branch was born on October 24, 2008, and grew up in Gilbert, Arizona. He first attended Perry High School in Gilbert, where he helped the Perry Pumas to consecutive state championships, including helping them to a 27–2 record and a national fourth-place ranking as a sophomore. In June 2025, he announced a transfer to Prolific Prep in Fort Lauderdale, Florida, for his junior year.

In 2025, Branch competed for the Adidas 3SSB circuit, playing for team Compton Magic while averaging 15.9 points, 5.2 rebounds, 2.0 assists and 1.3 blocks. He was also a top performer at the Adidas Eurocamp in Treviso, Italy, where he was received the Rising Star award and received All-Camp Team honors, despite playing against some players up to two years older than himself.

Branch, a five-star prospect, was initially ranked the number-one player in the recruiting class of 2027. However, in November 2025, he announced his reclassification to the class of 2026. After his reclassification, he was ranked the eighth-best recruit in the 2026 class by 247Sports. Branch committed to play college basketball for the BYU Cougars.
