= Nike Hoop Summit =

International basketball all-star game

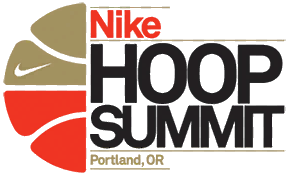
- Date: 1995; 31 years ago
- Frequency: Annually
- Venue: Moda Center
- Location: Portland, Oregon (2008–present)
- Country: United States
- Inaugurated: 1995
- Most recent: 2026
- Organiser: USA Basketball
- Sponsor: Nike

The Nike Hoop Summit is an international basketball all-star game sponsored by Nike. It is held once a year and is currently played in Portland, Oregon. The game features the USA Basketball Men's Junior Select Team against international players on the World Select Team. Many players selected to the event have previously played on the international stage representing a national team.

== History ==
The summit was developed in 1995 by George Raveling, a former college basketball coach who was instrumental in Nike's 1984 endorsement and merchandise deal with Michael Jordan. Raveling joined the company in 1994 as a promoter at the request of Nike co-founder Phil Knight.

In the 2010 edition of the event, Enes Kanter scored 34 points and surpassed the event's record of 33 points set by Dirk Nowitzki in 1998. In 2012, Shabazz Muhammad scored 35 points to break Kanter's scoring record. Bismack Biyombo recorded the first triple-double in Hoop Summit history in 2011 with 12 points, 11 rebounds, and 10 blocks.

15 players, all members of the World Team have been selected to play in two Hoop Summits: Jovo Stanojević (1995 & 1996), Alexandre Bachminov (1996 & 1997), Matthew Nielsen (1997 & 1998), Antonis Fotsis, (1998 & 1999), Boštjan Nachbar (1999 & 2000), Olumide Oyedeji (1999 & 2000), Alexis Ajinça (2007 & 2008), Dario Šarić (2011 & 2012), Andrew Wiggins (2012 & 2013), Karl-Anthony Towns (2013 & 2014), Jamal Murray (2014 & 2015), Thon Maker (2015 & 2016), RJ Barrett (2017 & 2018), Kofi Cockburn (2018 & 2019), Omaha Billew (2022 & 2023) and AJ Dybantsa (2024 & 2025).

Although it previously rotated American cities, the event has been hosted in Portland, Oregon since 2008. There was no Hoop Summit in 2020 or 2021 due to the COVID-19 pandemic, although rosters were named for the US both years. The Hoop Summit was also not played from 2001–2003.

In 2023, a women's game was introduced. The USA beat the World team in the inaugural game, 100–79.

== Annual game results ==
=== Men's ===
The USA leads the all-time series 19–7.

Year	Location	Final score
1995	Springfield, Massachusetts	USA 86 – World 77
1996	Charlotte, North Carolina	World 104 – USA 96
1997	Lake Buena Vista, Florida	USA 97 – World 90
1998	San Antonio, Texas	World 104 – USA 99
1999	Tampa, Florida	USA 107 – World 95
2000	Indianapolis, Indiana	USA 98 – World 97
2004	San Antonio, Texas	USA 99 – World 79
2005	Memphis, Tennessee	USA 106 – World 98
2006	Memphis, Tennessee	USA 109 – World 91
2007	Memphis, Tennessee	USA 100 – World 80
2008	Portland, Oregon	USA 98 – World 78
2009	Portland, Oregon	World 97 – USA 89
2010	Portland, Oregon	USA 101 – World 97
2011	Portland, Oregon	USA 92 – World 80
2012	Portland, Oregon	World 84 – USA 75
2013	Portland, Oregon	World 112 – USA 98
2014	Portland, Oregon	USA 84 – World 73
2015	Portland, Oregon	World 103 – USA 101
2016	Portland, Oregon	USA 101 – World 67
2017	Portland, Oregon	USA 98 – World 87
2018	Portland, Oregon	World 89 – USA 76
2019	Portland, Oregon	USA 93 – World 87
2020	Cancelled due to the COVID-19 pandemic	
2021	Cancelled due to the COVID-19 pandemic	
2022	Portland, Oregon	USA 102 – World 80
2023	Portland, Oregon	USA 90 – World 84
2024	Portland, Oregon	USA 98 – World 75
2025	Portland, Oregon	USA 124 – World 114 (OT)
2026	Portland, Oregon	USA 102 – World 100 (OT)

=== Women's ===
The USA leads the all-time series 4–0.

Year	Location	Final score
2023	Portland, Oregon	USA 100 – World 79
2024	Portland, Oregon	USA 83 – World 80
2025	Portland, Oregon	USA 90 – World 78
2026	Portland, Oregon	USA 104 – World 77

== Statistical leaders and records ==
=== Men's ===
*	= Nike Hoop Summit Record
^	= Team Record

USA
Year	Points	Rebounds	Assists	Steals	Blocks
1995	Albert White (13)	Kevin Garnett (10)	Stephon Marbury (5)	Stephon Marbury/B.J. McKie/Ryan Robertson (2)	Kevin Garnett (9)^
1996	Jermaine O'Neal (21)	Jermaine O'Neal (10)	Ed Cota (4)	Winfred Walton (3)	Jermaine O'Neal (7)
1997	Larry Hughes (20)	Ron Artest (9)	Baron Davis (5)	Ron Artest (5)	Shane Battier (2)
1998	Al Harrington (26)	Al Harrington (9)	Ronald Curry (4)	Jason Capel/Rashard Lewis (4)	JaRon Rush/Rashard Lewis (2)
1999	Casey Jacobsen (31)	Travis Watson (9)	Jay Williams (7)	Jay Williams/Travis Watson/Kevin Gaines (2)	Jason Parker (2)
2000	Zach Randolph (24)	Zach Randolph/Darius Miles (8)	Chris Duhon (6)	Darius Miles (3)	Darius Miles (2)
2004	Josh Smith (27)	Al Jefferson (7)	Sebastian Telfair (7)	Josh Smith/Sebastian Telfair/Rudy Gay (3)	Josh Smith (2)
2005	Tyler Hansbrough (31)	Tyler Hansbrough (10)	Greg Paulus (10)	Monta Ellis (4)	Tyler Hansbrough (3)
2006	Wayne Ellington (31)	Kevin Durant/Paul Harris (7)	Ty Lawson/Paul Harris (6)	Wayne Ellington (3)	Gerald Henderson (3)
2007	O. J. Mayo (20)	Michael Beasley (9)	Jonny Flynn (10)	Derrick Rose (4)	Michael Beasley/Kevin Love (2)
2008	DeMar DeRozan (17)	Tyreke Evans (8)	Jrue Holiday (5)	DeMar DeRozan/Jrue Holiday/Tyreke Evans/Jerime Anderson (3)	Drew Gordon (4)
2009	Xavier Henry (22)	John Henson (9)	John Wall (11)*	John Wall (5)	Mason Plumlee/John Henson (2)
2010	Harrison Barnes (27)	Jared Sullinger (8)	Kyrie Irving/Kendall Marshall (5)	Jared Sullinger/Kyrie Irving/Harrison Barnes (2)	Terrence Jones (3)
2011	Austin Rivers (20)	Anthony Davis (10)	Tony Wroten (5)	Tony Wroten (2)	Michael Kidd-Gilchrist (5)
2012	Shabazz Muhammad (35)*	Kyle Anderson (10)	Kyle Anderson (4)	Nerlens Noel (4)	Nerlens Noel (4)
2013	Jabari Parker (22)	Julius Randle (8)	Andrew Harrison (5)	Kasey Hill/Jabari Parker (3)	Rondae Hollis-Jefferson/Jabari Parker (2)
2014	Justise Winslow (16)	Jahlil Okafor (10)	Tyus Jones (6)	Tyus Jones (5)	Cliff Alexander/Kelly Oubre Jr./Joel Berry (1)
2015	Luke Kennard (22)	Luke Kennard/Chase Jeter (5)	Isaiah Briscoe (9)	Isaiah Briscoe (3)	Stephen Zimmerman (2)
2016	Terrance Ferguson (21)	Jarrett Allen (9)	De'Aaron Fox (5)	Markelle Fultz (5)	Jarrett Allen (3)
2017	Michael Porter Jr./Jarred Vanderbilt (19)	Jarred Vanderbilt/Jaren Jackson Jr. (10)	Collin Sexton (8)	Collin Sexton (4)	Mohamed Bamba (4)
2018	Darius Garland (16)	Bol Bol (14)	Darius Garland/Tre Jones (5)	Darius Garland/Tre Jones (2)	Bol Bol (6)
2019	Cole Anthony (25)	Cole Anthony/James Wiseman (8)	Wendell Moore Jr./Isaac Okoro (3)	Wendell Moore (2)	James Wiseman (6)
2022	Cam Whitmore (19)	Dillon Mitchell/Kyle Filipowski (8)	Amari Bailey/Dillon Mitchell/Dariq Whitehead (4)	Dariq Whitehead (3)	Dereck Lively II/Anthony Black (1)
2023	Ron Holland (15)	Ron Holland (9)	Ron Holland (5)	Ron Holland (6)*	Ron Holland/Bronny James/Jared McCain/D.J. Wagner (1)
2024	Cooper Flagg (19)	Cooper Flagg (11)	Ian Jackson (4)	Dylan Harper/Asa Newell (3)	Asa Newell/Morez Johnson Jr. (1)
2025	AJ Dybantsa/Darius Acuff (24)	Cameron Boozer (16)*	Cameron Boozer (6)	AJ Dybantsa/Cameron Boozer/Mikel Brown Jr. (3)	Nate Ament/Cameron Boozer/Cayden Boozer/Chris Cenac (1)
2026	Caleb Holt (24)	Caleb Holt (8)	Brandon McCoy Jr. (5)	Caleb Holt (7)*	Brandon McCoy Jr./Cameron Williams (3)

World
Year	Points	Rebounds	Assists	Steals	Blocks
1995	Dubravko Zemljić (22)	Fabricio Oberto/Jovo Stanojević (8)	Giacomo Galanda (2)	Giacomo Galanda (3)	Jörg Lütcke/Jovo Stanojević (1)
1996	Vladimir Bogojević (22)	Vladimir Bogojević (7)	Vladimir Bogojević (7)	Vladimir Bogojević (3)	Vladimir Bogojevic/Craig McAndrew/Leandro Palladino/Zhizhi Wang (1)
1997	Igor Rakočević (17)	Jérôme Moïso (8)	Lucas Victoriano (4)	Justino Victoriano/Matt Nielsen/Diego Frugoni (1)	Ruben Boumtje-Boumtje (4)
1998	Dirk Nowitzki (33)	Dirk Nowitzki (14)	Dimitri Lauwers (4)	Dirk Nowitzki (3)	Seco Camara/Dan Gadzuric (1)
1999	Vlado Ilievski (19)	Jesse Young/Olumide Oyedeji (8)	Vlado Ilievski (5)	Vlado Ilievski/Vladimir Radmanović (2)	Olumide Oyedeji (2)
2000	Tony Parker (20)	Olumide Oyedeji (13)	Tony Parker (7)	Tony Parker/Sergi Vidal/Marko Popovic (2)	Olumide Oyedeji/Abdou Diame/Neil Fingleton (1)
2004	Luka Bogdanović (20)	Michael Schroeder (9)	Marcus Vinicius de Souza (3)	Andrea Bargnani/Marcus Vinicius de Souza (1)	None
2005	Martynas Pocius (20)	Jevohn Shepherd (7)	Michael Mokongo (5)	Michael Mokongo (2)	Dušan Šakota (2)
2006	Milenko Tepić (16)	Daniel Clark (10)	Patrick Mills (6)	Daniel Clark (2)	Mouhamed Sene (9)
2007	Nicolas Batum (23)	Nemanja Aleksandrov (14)	Petteri Koponen (6)	Nicolas Batum (4)	Solomon Alabi (3)
2008	Alexis Ajinça (13)	Alexis Ajinça (9)	Žygimantas Janavičius (5)	Devoe Joseph/Diego Gerbaudo/Serge Ibaka (2)	Alexis Ajinça (3)
2009	Milan Mačvan (23)	Milan Mačvan (14)	Milan Mačvan (6)	Nikos Pappas (4)	Kevin Seraphin (2)
2010	Enes Kanter (34)^	Enes Kanter (13)	Maël Lebrun (4)	Tristan Thompson/Nikola Mirotić/Sui Ran/Maël Lebrun/Duje Dukan (1)	Tristan Thompson/Nikola Mirotić/Dejan Musli (1)
2011	Mateusz Ponitka (17)	Bismack Biyombo (11)	Raul Togni Neto (4)	Raul Togni Neto (2)	Bismack Biyombo (10)*
2012	Andrew Wiggins (20)	Dario Šarić (14)	Dario Šarić (5)	Léo Westermann (2)	Andrew Wiggins (2)
2013	Livio Jean-Charles (27)	Livio Jean-Charles (13)	Dennis Schröder (6)	Livio Jean-Charles/Dante Exum/Karl-Anthony Towns (2)	Livio Jean-Charles (2)
2014	Emmanuel Mudiay (20)	Trey Lyles (11)	Jamal Murray (5)	Emmanuel Mudiay (3)	Metecan Birsen (3)
2015	Jamal Murray (30)	Thon Maker (10)	Ben Simmons (9)^	Ben Simmons (2)	Skal Labissière (6)
2016	Wesley Alves da Silva (9)	Wesley Alves da Silva (8)	Wesley Alves da Silva (3)	Ziming Fan/Deandre Ayton/Andres Feliz/Martynas Varnas/William McDowell-White (1)	Harry Froling/Edin Atić (1)
2017	Kostja Mushidi (14)	Tadas Sedekerskis/Isaiah Hartenstein (4)	Lindell Wigginton (7)	Kostja Mushidi (3)	Isaiah Hartenstein/Borisa Simanic/Ike Obiagu (2)
2018	RJ Barrett (20)	Charles Bassey (16)*	RJ Barrett (6)	RJ Barrett (5)^	Kofi Cockburn (2)
2019	Nico Mannion (28)	Precious Achiuwa (11)	Didi Louzada Silva (6)	Precious Achiuwa/Andre Curbelo (2)	Precious Achiuwa (4)
2022	Jean Montero (23)	Sidy Cissoko (7)	Sidy Cissoko (4)	Sidy Cissoko (3)	Leonard Miller/Felix Okpara/Mike Sharavjamts (2)
2023	Mackenzie Mgbako (22)	Mackenzie Mgbako/Michael Nwoko/Zaccharie Risacher (8)	London Johnson (4)	Baye Fall (2)	Baye Fall/Miro Little/Yves Missi/Michael Nwoko/Zaccharie Risacher/Andrej Stojakovic (1)
2024	AJ Dybantsa (21)	AJ Dybantsa (7)	Nolan Traore (4)	V. J. Edgecombe/AJ Dybantsa/Annor Boateng (2)	Ulrich Chomche (3)
2025	Tounde Yessoufou (24)	Bogoljub Marković (10)	Omer Mayer (7)	Ikenna Alozie (3)	Ikenna Alozie/David Mirković/Tajh Ariza (1)
2026	Miles Sadler (29)	Miles Sadler (7)	Ikenna Alozie (7)	Ikenna Alozie (4)	Abdou Toure (5)

=== Women's ===
USA
Year	Points	Rebounds	Assists	Steals	Blocks
2023	Mikaylah Williams (22)	Madison Booker (8)	Hannah Hidalgo (8)*	Hannah Hidalgo (5)	Jadyn Donovan/Sunaja Agara (1)
2024	Joyce Edwards (25)*	Joyce Edwards (9)	Joyce Edwards/Mackenly Randolph (2)	Kennedy Smith (6)*	Mackenly Randolph (1)
2025	Jazzy Davidson (17)	Sienna Betts (9)	Jazzy Davidson (6)	Sienna Betts (5)	Jazzy Davidson (3)^
2026	Jerzy Robinson/Saniyah Hill (19)	McKenna Woliczko (13)*	McKenna Woliczko (6)	Jacy Abii (5)	Jacy Abii/McKenna Woliczko/Addison Bjorn/Trinity Jones/Autumn Fleary/Jordyn Jackson (1)

World
Year	Points	Rebounds	Assists	Steals	Blocks
2023	Shaneice Swain (19)^	Toby Fournier (9)^	Diana Collins/Shaneice Swain/Delaney Gibb (2)	Marine Dursus (3)	Nyadiew Puoch (4)*
2024	Avery Howell/Kate Koval/Faith Etute (12)	Avery Howell/Toby Fournier (7)	Kate Koval/Delaney Gibb/Shay Ijiwoye/Annika Soltau/Jasmine Bascoe (2)	Toby Fournier/Annika Soltau/Faith Etute (2)	Kate Koval (4)*
2025	Ayla McDowell (15)	Saffron Shiels (8)	Saffron Shiels/Bella Hines (3)^	Agot Makeer (2)	Sarah Cisse (2)
2026	Sitaya Fagan (15)	Kathy-Emma Otto (7)	Jovana Popović (3)^	Ivanna Wilson-Manyacka (4)^	Savvy Swords/Eve Long/Emma Broliron/Kathy-Emma Otto/Olivia Vukosa/Ogechi Okeke (1)

== Alumni selected in the NBA draft ==
Key
^{x}	Denotes player who is still active in the NBA
^{+}	Elected to the Naismith Memorial Basketball Hall of Fame
^{#}	Denotes player who never played in the NBA regular season or playoffs

- 240 total draft picks
  - USA: 163
  - World: 77
  - First Round Picks: 178
  - Second Round Picks: 62
- Draft(s) with the most alumni picked: 2011 & 2012 (15)

Name	Position	Draft Year	Round	Pick	Drafted by	NHS Year(s)	NHS Team
Kevin Garnett^{+}	Power forward/center	1995	1	5	Minnesota Timberwolves	1995	USA
Shareef Abdur-Rahim	Power forward/small forward	1996	1	3	Vancouver Grizzlies	1995	USA
Stephon Marbury	Point guard	1996	1	4	Milwaukee Bucks	1995	USA
Jermaine O'Neal	Center/power forward	1996	1	17	Portland Trail Blazers	1996	USA
Mike Bibby	Point guard	1998	1	2	Vancouver Grizzlies	1996	USA
Antawn Jamison	Power forward/small forward	1998	1	4	Toronto Raptors	1995	USA
Robert Traylor	Power forward/center	1998	1	6	Dallas Mavericks	1995	USA
Larry Hughes	Guard/small forward	1998	1	8	Philadelphia 76ers	1997	USA
Dirk Nowitzki^{+}	Power forward	1998	1	9	Milwaukee Bucks	1998	World
Al Harrington	Power forward	1998	1	25	Indiana Pacers	1998	USA
Corey Benjamin	Guard	1998	1	28	Chicago Bulls	1996	USA
Rashard Lewis	Small forward/power forward	1998	2	32	Seattle SuperSonics	1998	USA
Jelani McCoy	Power forward/center	1998	2	33	Seattle SuperSonics	1995	USA
Bruno Šundov	Center	1998	2	35	Dallas Mavericks	1999	World
Elton Brand	Power forward/center	1999	1	1	Chicago Bulls	1997	USA
Baron Davis	Point guard	1999	1	3	Charlotte Hornets	1997	USA
William Avery	Point guard	1999	1	14	Minnesota Timberwolves	1997	USA
Ron Artest	Small forward	1999	1	16	Chicago Bulls	1997	USA
Dion Glover	Shooting guard	1999	1	20	Atlanta Hawks	1997	USA
Wang Zhizhi	Center	1999	2	36	Dallas Mavericks	1996	World
Ryan Robertson	Shooting guard	1999	2	45	Sacramento Kings	1995	USA
Kris Clack^{#}	Small forward	1999	2	55	Boston Celtics	1995	USA
Stromile Swift	Power forward/center	2000	1	2	Vancouver Grizzlies	1998	USA
Darius Miles	Small forward/power forward	2000	1	3	Los Angeles Clippers	2000	USA
Jason Collier	Center	2000	1	15	Milwaukee Bucks	1996	USA
Quentin Richardson	Shooting guard/small forward	2000	1	18	Los Angeles Clippers	1998	USA
Erick Barkley	Point guard	2000	1	28	Portland Trail Blazers	1998	USA
Olumide Oyedeji	Center	2000	2	42	Seattle SuperSonics	1999/2000	World
Igor Rakočević	Guard	2000	2	51	Minnesota Timberwolves	1997	World
Shane Battier	Small forward	2001	1	6	Vancouver Grizzlies	1997	USA
Joe Johnson	Shooting guard/small forward	2001	1	10	Boston Celtics	1999	USA
Vladimir Radmanović	Power forward/small forward	2001	1	12	Seattle SuperSonics	1999	World
Zach Randolph	Power forward/center	2001	1	19	Portland Trail Blazers	2000	USA
Tony Parker	Point guard	2001	1	28	San Antonio Spurs	2000	World
Omar Cook	Point guard	2001	2	31	Orlando Magic	2000	USA
Eric Chenowith^{#}	Center	2001	2	43	New York Knicks	1997	USA
Loren Woods	Center	2001	2	46	Minnesota Timberwolves	1996	USA
Antonis Fotsis	Power forward	2001	2	48	Vancouver Grizzlies	1998/1999	World
Ruben Boumtje-Boumtje	Center	2001	2	49	Portland Trail Blazers	1997	World
Jay Williams	Point guard	2002	1	2	Chicago Bulls	1999	USA
Mike Dunleavy Jr.	Small forward/shooting guard	2002	1	3	Golden State Warriors	1999	USA
Jared Jeffries	Power forward/center	2002	1	11	Washington Wizards	2000	USA
Boštjan Nachbar	Small forward/power forward	2002	1	15	Houston Rockets	1999/2000	World
Ryan Humphrey	Power forward	2002	1	19	Utah Jazz	1997	USA
Casey Jacobsen	Shooting guard/small forward	2002	1	22	Phoenix Suns	1999	USA
Dan Gadzuric	Center	2002	2	34	Milwaukee Bucks	1998	World
Darius Songaila	Power forward/center	2002	2	50	Boston Celtics	1998	World
Marcus Taylor^{#}	Point guard	2002	2	52	Minnesota Timberwolves	2000	USA
Luis Scola	Power forward	2002	2	56	San Antonio Spurs	1998	World
Kirk Hinrich	Shooting guard/point guard	2003	1	7	Chicago Bulls	1999	USA
Nick Collison	Power forward/center	2003	1	12	Seattle SuperSonics	1999	USA
Sebastian Telfair	Point guard	2004	1	13	Portland Trail Blazers	2004	USA
Al Jefferson	Center	2004	1	15	Boston Celtics	2004	USA
Josh Smith	Power forward/small forward	2004	1	17	Atlanta Hawks	2004	USA
J. R. Smith	Shooting guard	2004	1	18	New Orleans Hornets	2004	USA
Chris Duhon	Point guard	2004	2	38	Chicago Bulls	2000	USA
Martell Webster	Small forward/shooting guard	2005	1	6	Portland Trail Blazers	2005	USA
Monta Ellis	Shooting guard	2005	2	40	Golden State Warriors	2005	USA
Roko Ukić	Point guard/shooting guard	2005	2	41	Toronto Raptors	2004	World
Lou Williams	Shooting guard/point guard	2005	2	45	Philadelphia 76ers	2005	USA
Andrea Bargnani	Power forward/center	2006	1	1	Toronto Raptors	2004	World
Rudy Gay	Small forward	2006	1	8	Houston Rockets	2004	USA
Mouhamed Sene	Center	2006	1	10	Seattle SuperSonics	2006	World
Jordan Farmar	Point guard	2006	1	26	Los Angeles Lakers	2004	USA
Sergio Rodríguez	Point guard	2006	1	27	Phoenix Suns	2004	World
Daniel Gibson	Guard	2006	2	42	Cleveland Cavaliers	2004	USA
Marcus Vinicius de Souza	Small forward/power forward	2006	2	43	New Orleans/Oklahoma City Hornets	2004	World
Kevin Durant^{x}	Small forward	2007	1	2	Seattle SuperSonics	2006	USA
Yi Jianlian	Power forward/center	2007	1	6	Milwaukee Bucks	2004	World
Brandan Wright	Power forward/center	2007	1	8	Charlotte Bobcats	2006	USA
Spencer Hawes	Center/power forward	2007	1	10	Sacramento Kings	2006	USA
Thaddeus Young^{x}	Power forward/small forward	2007	1	12	Philadelphia 76ers	2006	USA
Julian Wright	Power forward/center	2007	1	13	New Orleans Hornets	2005	USA
Petteri Koponen^{#}	Point guard/shooting guard	2007	1	30	Philadelphia 76ers	2007	World
Derrick Rose	Point guard	2008	1	1	Chicago Bulls	2007	USA
Michael Beasley	Small forward/power forward	2008	1	2	Miami Heat	2007	USA
O. J. Mayo	Shooting guard	2008	1	3	Minnesota Timberwolves	2007	USA
Kevin Love^{x}	Power forward/center	2008	1	5	Memphis Grizzlies	2007	USA
Jerryd Bayless	Point guard/shooting guard	2008	1	11	Indiana Pacers	2007	USA
Brandon Rush	Shooting guard/small forward	2008	1	13	Portland Trail Blazers	2005	USA
Alexis Ajinça	Center/power forward	2008	1	20	Charlotte Bobcats	2007/2008	World
Serge Ibaka	Power forward	2008	1	24	Seattle SuperSonics	2008	World
Nicolas Batum^{x}	Small forward/shooting guard	2008	1	25	Houston Rockets	2007	World
Donté Greene	Forward	2008	1	28	Memphis Grizzlies	2007	USA
D. J. White	Power forward	2008	1	29	Detroit Pistons	2004	USA
Malik Hairston	Small forward	2008	2	48	Phoenix Suns	2004	USA
Richard Hendrix^{#}	Power forward/center	2008	2	49	Golden State Warriors	2005	USA
Semih Erden	Center	2008	2	60	Boston Celtics	2005	World
Tyreke Evans	Guard/small forward	2009	1	4	Sacramento Kings	2008	USA
Jonny Flynn	Point guard	2009	1	6	Minnesota Timberwolves	2007	USA
DeMar DeRozan^{x}	Shooting guard	2009	1	9	Toronto Raptors	2008	USA
Gerald Henderson Jr.	Shooting guard	2009	1	12	Charlotte Bobcats	2006	USA
Tyler Hansbrough	Power forward/center	2009	1	13	Indiana Pacers	2005	USA
Jrue Holiday^{x}	Point guard	2009	1	17	Philadelphia 76ers	2008	USA
Ty Lawson	Point guard	2009	1	18	Minnesota Timberwolves	2006	USA
Omri Casspi	Power forward/small forward	2009	1	23	Sacramento Kings	2007	World
Wayne Ellington	Shooting guard	2009	1	28	Minnesota Timberwolves	2006	USA
Jon Brockman	Power forward	2009	2	38	Portland Trail Blazers	2005	USA
Patty Mills^{x}	Point guard	2009	2	55	Portland Trail Blazers	2006	World
John Wall^{x}	Point guard	2010	1	1	Washington Wizards	2009	USA
DeMarcus Cousins	Center/power forward	2010	1	5	Sacramento Kings	2009	USA
Greg Monroe	Center/power forward	2010	1	7	Detroit Pistons	2008	USA
Al-Farouq Aminu	Forward	2010	1	8	Los Angeles Clippers	2008	USA
Xavier Henry	Shooting guard/small forward	2010	1	12	Memphis Grizzlies	2009	USA
Ed Davis	Power forward/center	2010	1	13	Toronto Raptors	2008	USA
Patrick Patterson	Power forward	2010	1	14	Houston Rockets	2007	USA
Kevin Séraphin	Power forward/center	2010	1	17	Chicago Bulls	2009	World
Avery Bradley	Shooting guard	2010	1	19	Boston Celtics	2009	USA
Ryan Richards^{#}	Power forward/center	2010	2	49	San Antonio Spurs	2007	World
Solomon Alabi	Center	2010	2	50	Dallas Mavericks	2007	World
Kyrie Irving^{x}	Point guard	2011	1	1	Cleveland Cavaliers	2010	USA
Enes Kanter	Center	2011	1	3	Utah Jazz	2010	World
Tristan Thompson	Center/power forward	2011	1	4	Cleveland Cavaliers	2010	World
Bismack Biyombo^{x}	Center	2011	1	7	Sacramento Kings	2011	World
Brandon Knight	Shooting guard/point guard	2011	1	8	Detroit Pistons	2010	USA
Tobias Harris^{x}	Small forward/power forward	2011	1	19	Charlotte Bobcats	2010	USA
Donatas Motiejūnas	Power forward/center	2011	1	20	Minnesota Timberwolves	2009	World
Nolan Smith	Shooting guard/point guard	2011	1	21	Portland Trail Blazers	2007	USA
Nikola Mirotić	Power forward	2011	1	23	Houston Rockets	2010	World
Cory Joseph^{x}	Point guard	2011	1	29	San Antonio Spurs	2010	World
Kyle Singler	Small forward	2011	2	33	Detroit Pistons	2007	USA
Dāvis Bertāns^{x}	Power forward	2011	2	42	Indiana Pacers	2011	World
Malcolm Lee	Shooting guard	2011	2	43	Chicago Bulls	2008	USA
Vernon Macklin	Center/power forward	2011	2	52	Detroit Pistons	2006	USA
Milan Mačvan^{#}	Power forward	2011	2	54	Cleveland Cavaliers	2009	World
Anthony Davis^{x}	Power forward/center	2012	1	1	New Orleans Hornets	2011	USA
Michael Kidd-Gilchrist	Small forward	2012	1	2	Charlotte Bobcats	2011	USA
Bradley Beal^{x}	Shooting guard	2012	1	3	Washington Wizards	2011	USA
Harrison Barnes^{x}	Small forward/power forward	2012	1	7	Golden State Warriors	2010	USA
Austin Rivers^{x}	Shooting guard/point guard	2012	1	10	New Orleans Hornets	2011	USA
Meyers Leonard^{x}	Center	2012	1	11	Portland Trail Blazers	2010	USA
Kendall Marshall	Point guard	2012	1	13	Phoenix Suns	2010	USA
John Henson	Center	2012	1	14	Milwaukee Bucks	2009	USA
Terrence Jones	Power forward/small forward	2012	1	18	Houston Rockets	2010	USA
Evan Fournier^{x}	Shooting guard/small forward	2012	1	20	Denver Nuggets	2011	World
Jared Sullinger	Power forward	2012	1	21	Boston Celtics	2010	USA
Tony Wroten	Point guard/shooting guard	2012	1	25	Memphis Grizzlies	2011	USA
Marquis Teague	Point guard	2012	1	29	Chicago Bulls	2011	USA
Will Barton^{x}	Shooting guard	2012	2	40	Portland Trail Blazers	2010	USA
Tomislav Zubčić^{#}	Power forward/center	2012	2	56	Toronto Raptors	2009	World
Anthony Bennett	Power forward	2013	1	1	Cleveland Cavaliers	2012	World
Nerlens Noel^{x}	Center/power forward	2013	1	6	New Orleans Pelicans	2012	USA
Shabazz Muhammad	Shooting guard/small forward	2013	1	14	Utah Jazz	2012	USA
Lucas Nogueira	Center	2013	1	16	Boston Celtics	2011	World
Dennis Schröder^{x}	Point guard	2013	1	17	Atlanta Hawks	2013	World
Sergey Karasev	Shooting guard/small forward	2013	1	19	Cleveland Cavaliers	2013	World
Mason Plumlee^{x}	Center/power forward	2013	1	22	Brooklyn Nets	2009	USA
Reggie Bullock^{x}	Small forward	2013	1	25	Los Angeles Clippers	2010	USA
Livio Jean-Charles^{#}	Power forward	2013	1	28	San Antonio Spurs	2013	World
Archie Goodwin	Shooting guard	2013	1	29	Oklahoma City Thunder	2012	USA
Raulzinho Neto	Point guard	2013	2	47	Atlanta Hawks	2011	World
Andrew Wiggins^{x}	Small forward	2014	1	1	Cleveland Cavaliers	2012/2013	World
Jabari Parker	Power forward/small forward	2014	1	2	Milwaukee Bucks	2013	USA
Joel Embiid^{x}	Center	2014	1	3	Philadelphia 76ers	2013	World
Aaron Gordon^{x}	Power forward	2014	1	4	Orlando Magic	2013	USA
Dante Exum^{x}	Point guard	2014	1	5	Utah Jazz	2013	World
Julius Randle^{x}	Power forward/center	2014	1	7	Los Angeles Lakers	2013	USA
Noah Vonleh	Power forward	2014	1	9	Charlotte Hornets	2013	USA
Dario Šarić^{x}	Power forward	2014	1	12	Orlando Magic	2011/2012	World
Gary Harris^{x}	Shooting guard	2014	1	19	Chicago Bulls	2012	USA
Mitch McGary	Power forward	2014	1	21	Oklahoma City Thunder	2012	USA
Clint Capela^{x}	Center	2014	1	25	Houston Rockets	2014	World
Kyle Anderson^{x}	Small forward/shooting guard	2014	1	30	San Antonio Spurs	2012	USA
Damien Inglis	Power forward/small forward	2014	2	31	Milwaukee Bucks	2014	World
Nikola Jokić^{x}	Center	2014	2	41	Denver Nuggets	2014	World
Karl-Anthony Towns^{x}	Center	2015	1	1	Minnesota Timberwolves	2013/2014	World
Jahlil Okafor	Center	2015	1	3	Philadelphia 76ers	2014	USA
Emmanuel Mudiay	Point guard	2015	1	7	Denver Nuggets	2014	World
Stanley Johnson^{x}	Small forward	2015	1	8	Detroit Pistons	2014	USA
Justise Winslow^{x}	Small forward	2015	1	10	Miami Heat	2014	USA
Myles Turner^{x}	Center	2015	1	11	Indiana Pacers	2014	USA
Trey Lyles^{x}	Power forward	2015	1	12	Utah Jazz	2014	World
Kelly Oubre Jr.^{x}	Small forward	2015	1	15	Atlanta Hawks	2014	USA
Bobby Portis^{x}	Power forward	2015	1	22	Chicago Bulls	2013	USA
Rondae Hollis-Jefferson	Small forward/power forward	2015	1	23	Portland Trail Blazers	2013	USA
Tyus Jones^{x}	Point guard	2015	1	24	Cleveland Cavaliers	2014	USA
Rakeem Christmas	Power forward/center	2015	2	36	Minnesota Timberwolves	2011	USA
Andrew Harrison	Point guard	2015	2	44	Phoenix Suns	2013	USA
Ben Simmons^{x}	Point guard/forward	2016	1	1	Philadelphia 76ers	2015	World
Brandon Ingram^{x}	Small forward	2016	1	2	Los Angeles Lakers	2015	USA
Jaylen Brown^{x}	Shooting guard/small forward	2016	1	3	Boston Celtics	2015	USA
Jamal Murray^{x}	Shooting guard/point guard	2016	1	7	Denver Nuggets	2014/2015	World
Thon Maker	Power forward/center	2016	1	10	Milwaukee Bucks	2015/2016	World
Henry Ellenson	Power forward	2016	1	18	Detroit Pistons	2015	USA
Skal Labissière	Power forward/center	2016	1	28	Phoenix Suns	2015	World
Cheick Diallo	Power forward/center	2016	2	33	Los Angeles Clippers	2015	World
Stephen Zimmerman	Center	2016	2	41	Orlando Magic	2015	USA
Zhou Qi	Power forward/center	2016	2	43	Houston Rockets	2015	World
Isaia Cordinier^{#}	Shooting guard	2016	2	44	Atlanta Hawks	2016	World
Demetrius Jackson	Point guard	2016	2	45	Boston Celtics	2013	USA
Wang Zhelin^{#}	Center	2016	2	57	Memphis Grizzlies	2012	World
Markelle Fultz^{x}	Point guard/shooting guard	2017	1	1	Philadelphia 76ers	2016	USA
Jayson Tatum^{x}	Small forward	2017	1	3	Boston Celtics	2016	USA
Josh Jackson	Small forward/shooting guard	2017	1	4	Phoenix Suns	2016	USA
De'Aaron Fox^{x}	Point guard	2017	1	5	Sacramento Kings	2016	USA
Jonathan Isaac^{x}	Small forward/power forward	2017	1	6	Orlando Magic	2016	USA
Lauri Markkanen^{x}	Power forward	2017	1	7	Chicago Bulls	2016	World
Luke Kennard^{x}	Shooting guard	2017	1	12	Detroit Pistons	2015	USA
Harry Giles	Power forward	2017	1	20	Portland Trail Blazers	2016	USA
Terrance Ferguson	Shooting guard	2017	1	21	Oklahoma City Thunder	2016	USA
Jarrett Allen^{x}	Center	2017	1	22	Brooklyn Nets	2016	USA
Caleb Swanigan	Power forward	2017	1	26	Portland Trail Blazers	2015	USA
Frank Jackson	Point guard	2017	2	31	Charlotte Hornets	2016	USA
Ivan Rabb	Power forward/center	2017	2	35	Orlando Magic	2015	USA
Isaiah Hartenstein^{x}	Power forward/center	2017	2	43	Houston Rockets	2017	World
Deandre Ayton^{x}	Center/power forward	2018	1	1	Phoenix Suns	2016	World
Jaren Jackson Jr.^{x}	Power forward/center	2018	1	4	Memphis Grizzlies	2017	USA
Mo Bamba^{x}	Center	2018	1	6	Orlando Magic	2017	USA
Wendell Carter Jr.^{x}	Center/power forward	2018	1	7	Chicago Bulls	2017	USA
Collin Sexton^{x}	Point guard	2018	1	8	Cleveland Cavaliers	2017	USA
Kevin Knox II	Small forward	2018	1	9	New York Knicks	2017	USA
Shai Gilgeous-Alexander^{x}	Point guard	2018	1	11	Charlotte Hornets	2017	World
Michael Porter Jr.^{x}	Small forward	2018	1	14	Denver Nuggets	2017	USA
Troy Brown Jr.^{x}	Small forward/shooting guard	2018	1	15	Washington Wizards	2017	USA
Anfernee Simons^{x}	Shooting guard	2018	1	24	Portland Trail Blazers	2018	USA
Jalen Brunson^{x}	Point guard	2018	2	33	Dallas Mavericks	2015	USA
Gary Trent Jr.^{x}	Shooting guard	2018	2	37	Sacramento Kings	2017	USA
Jarred Vanderbilt^{x}	Small forward	2018	2	41	Orlando Magic	2017	USA
Sviatoslav Mykhailiuk^{x}	Small forward	2018	2	47	Los Angeles Lakers	2014	World
Kostas Antetokounmpo	Power forward	2018	2	60	Philadelphia 76ers	2016	World
Zion Williamson^{x}	Power forward/small forward	2019	1	1	New Orleans Pelicans	2018	USA
RJ Barrett^{x}	Small forward/shooting guard	2019	1	3	New York Knicks	2017/2018	World
Darius Garland^{x}	Point guard	2019	1	5	Cleveland Cavaliers	2018	USA
Cam Reddish^{x}	Small forward/shooting guard	2019	1	10	Atlanta Hawks	2018	USA
Tyler Herro^{x}	Shooting guard	2019	1	13	Miami Heat	2018	USA
Romeo Langford^{x}	Shooting guard/small forward	2019	1	14	Boston Celtics	2018	USA
Nickeil Alexander-Walker^{x}	Shooting guard	2019	1	17	Brooklyn Nets	2017	World
Darius Bazley^{x}	Small forward	2019	1	23	Utah Jazz	2018	USA
Keldon Johnson^{x}	Shooting guard/small forward	2019	1	29	San Antonio Spurs	2018	USA
Marcos Louzada Silva	Small forward	2019	2	35	New Orleans Pelicans	2019	World
Bol Bol^{x}	Center	2019	2	44	Miami Heat	2018	USA
Ignas Brazdeikis^{x}	Small forward	2019	2	47	Sacramento Kings	2018	World
James Wiseman^{x}	Center	2020	1	2	Golden State Warriors	2019	USA
Isaac Okoro^{x}	Small forward	2020	1	5	Cleveland Cavaliers	2019	USA
Cole Anthony^{x}	Point guard	2020	1	15	Orlando Magic	2019	USA
Isaiah Stewart^{x}	Center	2020	1	16	Portland Trail Blazers	2019	USA
Josh Green^{x}	Shooting guard	2020	1	18	Dallas Mavericks	2018/2019	World
Precious Achiuwa^{x}	Power forward	2020	1	20	Miami Heat	2019	World
Tyrese Maxey^{x}	Point guard	2020	1	21	Philadelphia 76ers	2019	USA
Leandro Bolmaro	Shooting guard	2020	1	23	New York Knicks	2018	World
Payton Pritchard^{x}	Point guard	2020	1	26	Boston Celtics	2016	USA
Udoka Azubuike^{x}	Center	2020	1	27	Utah Jazz	2016	World
Vernon Carey Jr.	Center	2020	2	32	Charlotte Hornets	2019	USA
Daniel Oturu	Center	2020	2	33	Minnesota Timberwolves	2018	World
Tre Jones^{x}	Point guard	2020	2	41	San Antonio Spurs	2018	USA
Nick Richards^{x}	Center	2020	2	42	New Orleans Pelicans	2017	World
Nico Mannion	Point guard	2020	2	48	Golden State Warriors	2019	World
Cade Cunningham^{x}	Point guard	2021	1	1	Detroit Pistons	2020	USA
Jalen Green^{x}	Shooting guard	2021	1	2	Houston Rockets	2020	USA
Evan Mobley^{x}	Power forward/Center	2021	1	3	Cleveland Cavaliers	2020	USA
Scottie Barnes^{x}	Power forward	2021	1	4	Toronto Raptors	2020	USA
Jalen Suggs^{x}	Point guard	2021	1	5	Orlando Magic	2020	USA
Ziaire Williams^{x}	Small forward	2021	1	10	New Orleans Pelicans	2020	USA
Josh Christopher^{x}	Shooting guard	2021	1	24	Houston Rockets	2020	USA
Quentin Grimes^{x}	Shooting guard	2021	1	25	Los Angeles Clippers	2018	USA
Day'Ron Sharpe^{x}	Center	2021	1	29	Phoenix Suns	2020	USA
Jeremiah Robinson-Earl^{x}	Power forward	2021	2	32	New York Knicks	2019	USA
Chet Holmgren^{x}	Center	2022	1	2	Oklahoma City Thunder	2021	USA
Jabari Smith Jr.^{x}	Center	2022	1	3	Houston Rockets	2021	USA
Walker Kessler^{x}	Center	2022	1	22	Memphis Grizzlies	2020	USA
Wendell Moore Jr.^{x}	Shooting guard	2022	1	26	Dallas Mavericks	2019	USA
Patrick Baldwin Jr.^{x}	Small forward	2022	1	28	Golden State Warriors	2021	USA
Peyton Watson^{x}	Point guard	2022	1	30	Oklahoma City Thunder	2021	USA
Andrew Nembhard^{x}	Shooting guard	2022	2	32	Indiana Pacers	2018	World
Max Christie	Shooting guard	2022	2	35	Los Angeles Lakers	2021	USA
Jaden Hardy	Point guard	2022	2	37	Sacramento Kings	2021	USA
Kennedy Chandler	Point guard	2022	2	38	San Antonio Spurs	2021	USA
Trevor Keels	Shooting guard	2022	2	42	New York Knicks	2021	USA
Kendall Brown	Small forward	2022	2	48	Minnesota Timberwolves	2021	USA

== See also ==
- Nike Global Challenge
