= Sharife Cooper =

American basketball player (born 2001)

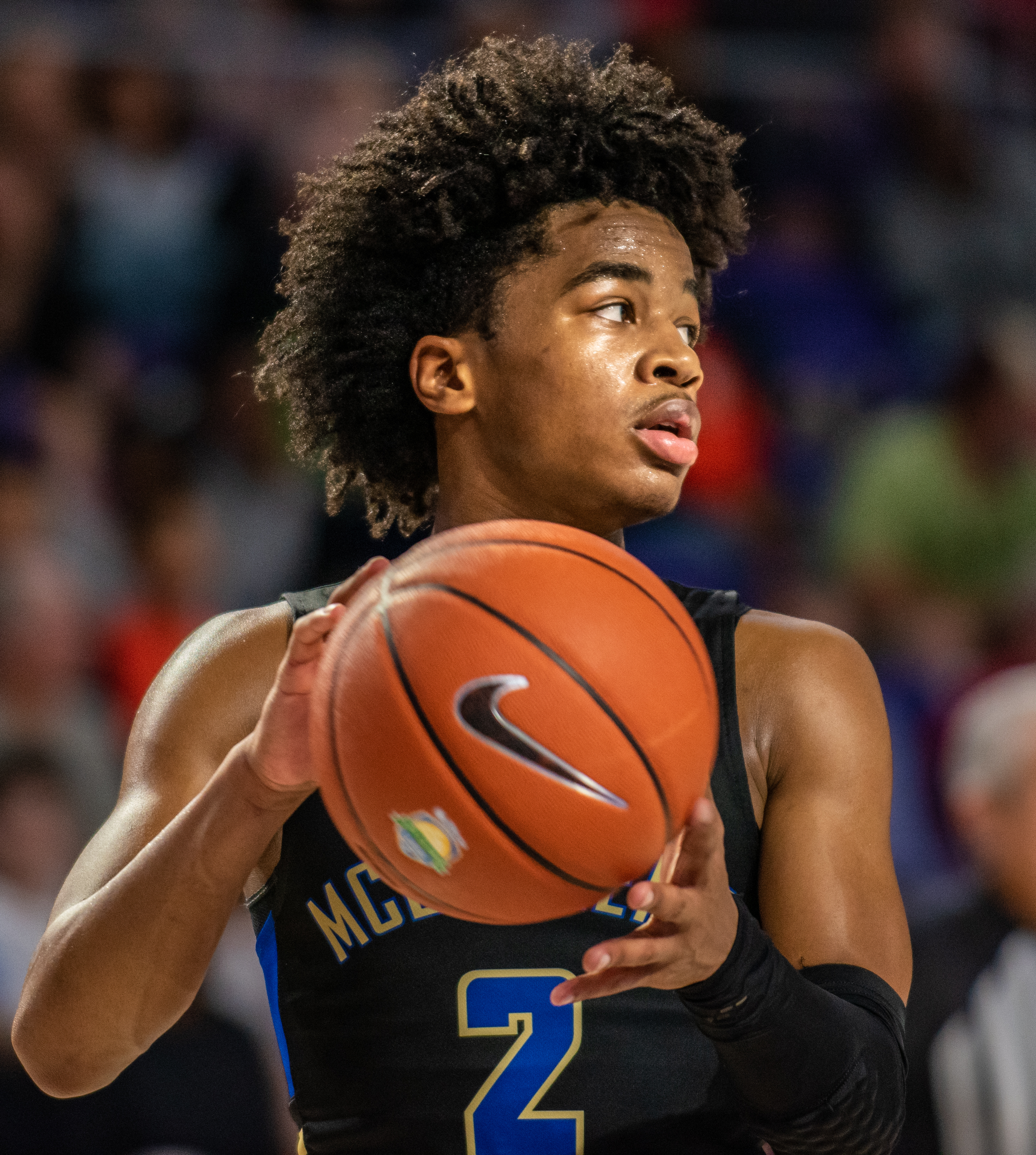
- Cooper in 2019

No. 2 – Liaoning Flying Leopards
- Position: Point guard
- League: CBA

Personal information
- Born: June 11, 2001 (age 25) Newark, New Jersey, U.S.
- Listed height: 6 ft 0 in (1.83 m)
- Listed weight: 176 lb (80 kg)

Career information
- High school: McEachern (Powder Springs, Georgia)
- College: Auburn (2020–2021)
- NBA draft: 2021: 2nd round, 48th overall pick
- Drafted by: Atlanta Hawks
- Playing career: 2021–present

Career history
- 2021–2022: Atlanta Hawks
- 2021–2022: →College Park Skyhawks
- 2022–2024: Cleveland Charge
- 2024: Liaoning Flying Leopards
- 2024: Merkezefendi
- 2024–2025: Aris Thessaloniki
- 2025: JDA Dijon
- 2025–2026: Washington Wizards
- 2025–2026: →Capital City Go-Go
- 2026–present: Liaoning Flying Leopards

Career highlights
- CBA champion (2024); All-NBA G League Second Team (2023); NBA G League Next Up Game (2023); SEC All-Freshman Team (2021); McDonald's All-American (2020); USA Today All-USA Player of the Year (2019); MaxPreps National Basketball Player of the Year (2019); Mr. Georgia Basketball (2019)
- Stats at NBA.com
- Stats at Basketball Reference

Sharife Omar Cooper (born June 11, 2001) is an American professional basketball player for the Liaoning Flying Leopards of the Chinese Basketball Association (CBA). He played college basketball for the Auburn Tigers and was selected in the second round of the 2021 NBA draft by the Atlanta Hawks.

== High school career ==
In his freshman season in 2016–17, Cooper averaged 16 points and 4.4 assists per game, leading McEachern High School in Powder Springs, Georgia to a 29–1 record and an appearance in the Georgia High School Association (GHSA) Class 7A state semifinals. The following year, he led the Indians to a state quarterfinals appearance while posting a 26–3 record. He received considerable media attention in December 2017 for his 42-point performance against Jahvon Quinerly and nationally ranked Hudson Catholic Regional High School in the quarterfinals of the City of Palms Classic. He scored the game-winning buzzer-beater in an 83–81 overtime victory.

As a junior in 2018–19, Cooper led McEachern to a perfect 32–0 record and the first state title in school history while averaging 27.2 points, 8.1 assists, 5.6 rebounds and 4.3 steals per game. In the title-game win over Meadowcreek, he scored 20 points and dished four assists as McEachern finished ranked No. 1 in three national polls. He picked up most valuable player (MVP) honors at several tournaments, including the City of Palms Classic and Tournament of Champions. After the season, he was named USA Today All-USA Player of the Year, MaxPreps National Player of the Year, Mr. Georgia Basketball, and Georgia's Gatorade Player of the Year. He also earned USA Today All-USA first team and Naismith All-American second team honors. Cooper was selected to play in the 2020 McDonald's All-American Boys Game on January 23, 2020. On May 6, 2021, Cooper's #2 high school jersey number was retired at McEachern where he was honored as the most decorated male basketball player in school history.

=== Recruiting ===
A consensus five-star recruit, Cooper was considered one of the top prospects in his class. On September 27, 2019, he committed to play college basketball for Auburn, becoming the highest-ranked recruit and the second five-star recruit in program history.

College recruiting
Name	Hometown	School	Height	Weight	Commit date
Sharife Cooper; PG	Powder Springs, GA	McEachern (GA)	6 ft 0 in (1.83 m)	160 lb (73 kg)	Sep 27, 2019
Sharife Cooper; PG	Recruit ratings: Rivals: 247Sports: ESPN: (94)				
Overall recruit ranking: Rivals: 22 247Sports: 27 ESPN: 20
Note: In many cases, Scout, Rivals, 247Sports, On3, and ESPN may conflict in their listings of height and weight.; In these cases, the average was taken. ESPN grades are on a 100-point scale.; Sources: "Auburn 2020 Basketball Commitments". Rivals.; "2020 Auburn Tigers Recruiting Class". ESPN.; "2020 Team Ranking". Rivals.

== College career ==
Cooper missed the first 12 games of his freshman season due to a National Collegiate Athletic Association investigation into his eligibility. During that time, he explored professional options. On January 9, 2021, he made his Auburn debut, recording 26 points, nine assists and four rebounds in a 94–90 loss to Alabama. Four days later, Cooper posted a season-high 28 points, 12 assists and five rebounds in a 95–77 win over Georgia. As a freshman, he averaged 20.2 points, 8.1 assists and 4.3 rebounds per game through 12 appearances, earning Southeastern Conference All-Freshman Team honors. On April 2, 2021, Cooper declared for the 2021 NBA draft, forgoing his remaining college eligibility.

== Professional career ==
=== Atlanta Hawks (2021–2022) ===
Cooper was selected in the second round of the 2021 NBA draft with the 48th pick by the Atlanta Hawks. On August 5, 2021, he signed a two-way contract with the Hawks, splitting time with their NBA G League affiliate, the College Park Skyhawks. He played for the Hawks in the 2021 NBA Summer League, recording 11 points on 5–11 shooting, and 6 assists in 28 minutes at his debut in a 85–83 loss against the Boston Celtics. Cooper made his NBA debut in the Hawks' season opener against the Dallas Mavericks, going 0-for-3 from the field in a 113–87 win.

Cooper joined the Hawks' 2022 NBA Summer League roster. On July 22, 2022, Cooper re-signed with the Hawks on another two-way deal. He was waived three days later.

=== Cleveland Charge (2022–2024) ===
On September 20, 2022, Cooper signed with the Cleveland Cavaliers, but was waived on October 15. On October 24, he joined the Cleveland Charge's training camp roster. Cooper was named to the G League's inaugural Next Up Game for the 2022–23 season.

In July 2023, Cooper joined the Cleveland Cavaliers for the 2023 NBA Summer League and on September 13, 2023, he re-signed with the Cavaliers. However, he was waived on October 21 and one week later re-signed with the Charge.

On February 26, 2024, Cooper signed a 10-day contract with the Cavaliers, although he failed to make an appearance. On March 7, he returned to the Charge.

=== Liaoning Flying Leopards (2024) ===
On April 1, 2024, Cooper signed with the Liaoning Flying Leopards of the Chinese Basketball Association (CBA). He helped the Flying Leopards win the 2024 CBA championship, recording 22 points, nine assists and six rebounds off the bench in their title-clinching Game 4 victory over the Xinjiang Flying Tigers.

=== Yukatel Merkezefendi Belediyesi (2024) ===
On September 28, 2024, Cooper signed with Yukatel Merkezefendi Belediyesi of the Turkish Basketball Super League (BSL).

=== Aris Thessaloniki (2024–2025) ===
On November 21, 2024, Cooper moved to Greek club Aris for the rest of the season.

=== JDA Dijon (2025) ===
On April 9, 2025, Cooper signed with French club JDA Dijon of the LNB Pro A.

=== Washington Wizards (2025–2026) ===
On September 29, 2025, Cooper signed with the Washington Wizards on a two-way contract, one day before the start of training camp. Cooper made 41 total appearances (including one start) for the Wizards during the 2025–26 NBA season, recording averages of 8.1 points, 2.1 rebounds, and 3.0 assists.

=== Return to Liaoning Flying Leopards (2026–present) ===
On August 25, 2026, Cooper signed with the Liaoning Flying Leopards of the Chinese Basketball Association (CBA).

== Career statistics ==
Legend
GP	Games played	GS	Games started	MPG	Minutes per game
FG%	Field goal percentage	3P%	3-point field goal percentage	FT%	Free throw percentage
RPG	Rebounds per game	APG	Assists per game	SPG	Steals per game
BPG	Blocks per game	PPG	Points per game	**Bold**	Career high

=== NBA ===
Year	Team	GP	GS	MPG	FG%	3P%	FT%	RPG	APG	SPG	BPG	PPG
2021–22	Atlanta	13	0	3.0	.214	.167	–	.4	.4	.0	.0	.5
2025–26	Washington	**41**	**1**	**17.1**	**.514**	**.382**	**.833**	**2.1**	**3.0**	**.4**	**.1**	**8.1**
Career		54	1	13.7	.498	.366	.833	1.7	2.4	.3	.1	6.3

=== CBA ===
Year	Team	GP	GS	MPG	FG%	3P%	FT%	RPG	APG	SPG	BPG	PPG
2023–24	Liaoning Flying Leopards	7	0	13.6	.467	.400	.731	2.3	3.3	.3	.1	11.6

=== College ===
Year	Team	GP	GS	MPG	FG%	3P%	FT%	RPG	APG	SPG	BPG	PPG
2020–21	Auburn	12	12	33.1	.391	.228	.825	4.3	8.1	1.0	.3	20.2

== Personal life ==
Cooper was born in Newark, New Jersey to Omar and Kindall Cooper, and the family moved to the Atlanta area when he was around the age of six. He has two sisters, Te'a and Mia, who both won state titles at McEachern, while Te'a continued on to play at Tennessee, South Carolina and Baylor before being drafted by the Phoenix Mercury in the 2020 WNBA draft. Cooper also has a twin brother, Omar.
