= Mr. Basketball USA =

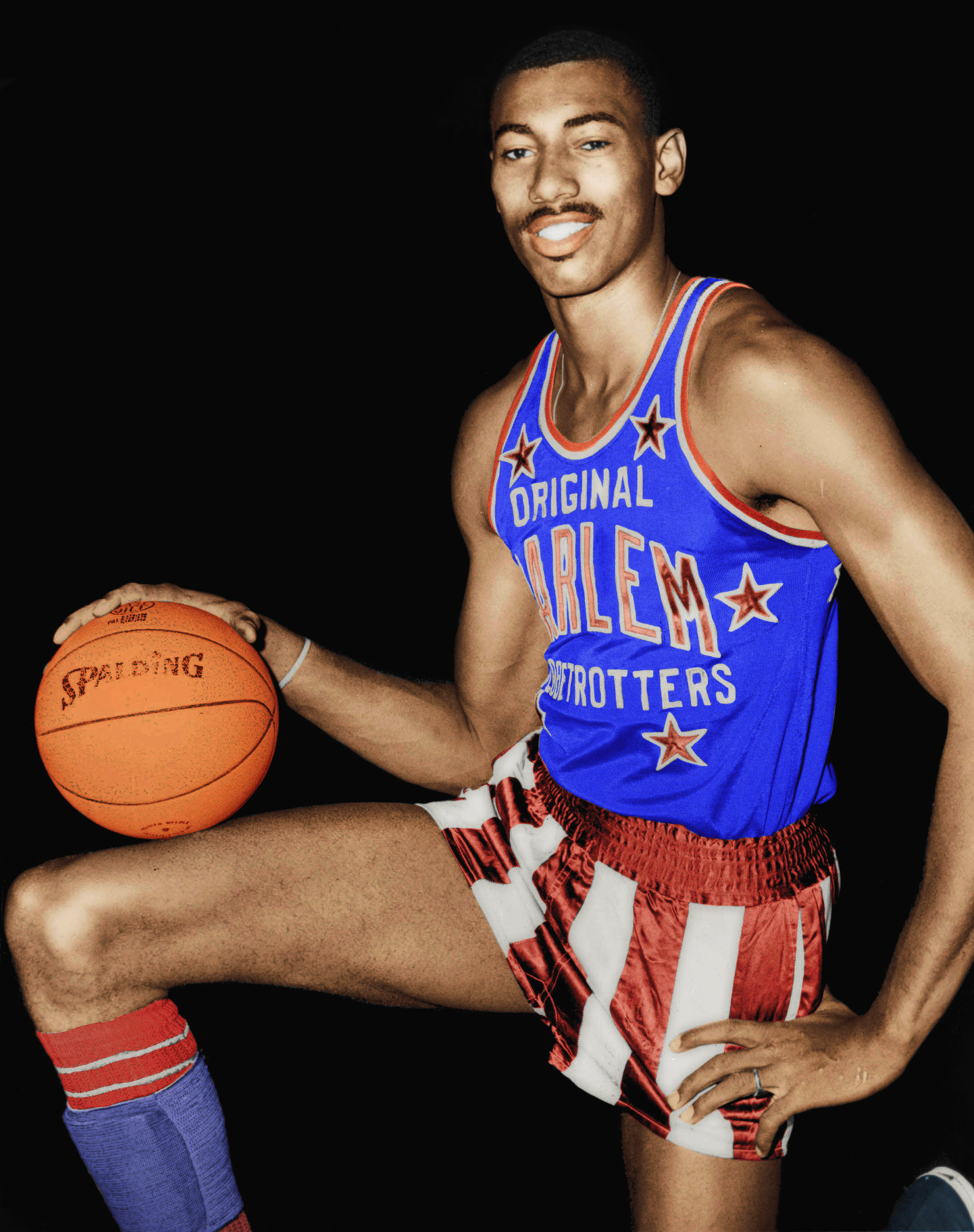
- Wilt Chamberlain is recognized as the first Mr. Basketball USA
- Awarded for: High school basketball's top male player
- Country: United States
- Presented by: Hoopscooponline.com
- First award: 1996 (retroactive to 1955)
- Currently held by: Jordan Smith Jr.

Mr. Basketball USA, formerly known as the ESPN RISE National Player of the Year and EA SPORTS National Player of the Year, is an award presented annually to the best-performing United States boys' high school basketball player as determined by Hoopscooponline.com (formerly named Grassrootshoops.net). Over the years, the award has been the property of several different organizations. From 1996 to 2002, the award was presented by Student Sports and from 2003 to 2009, it was presented by EA Sports. From 2010 to 2012, the award was presented by ESPN HS and in their final year, 2012, the award was given retroactively to a player from 1955 to 1995. The official first recipient of the award was Mike Bibby in 1996 and the first retroactive winner was Wilt Chamberlain recognized for 1955. The award was also presented by Ballislife.com for a time.

== Winners ==
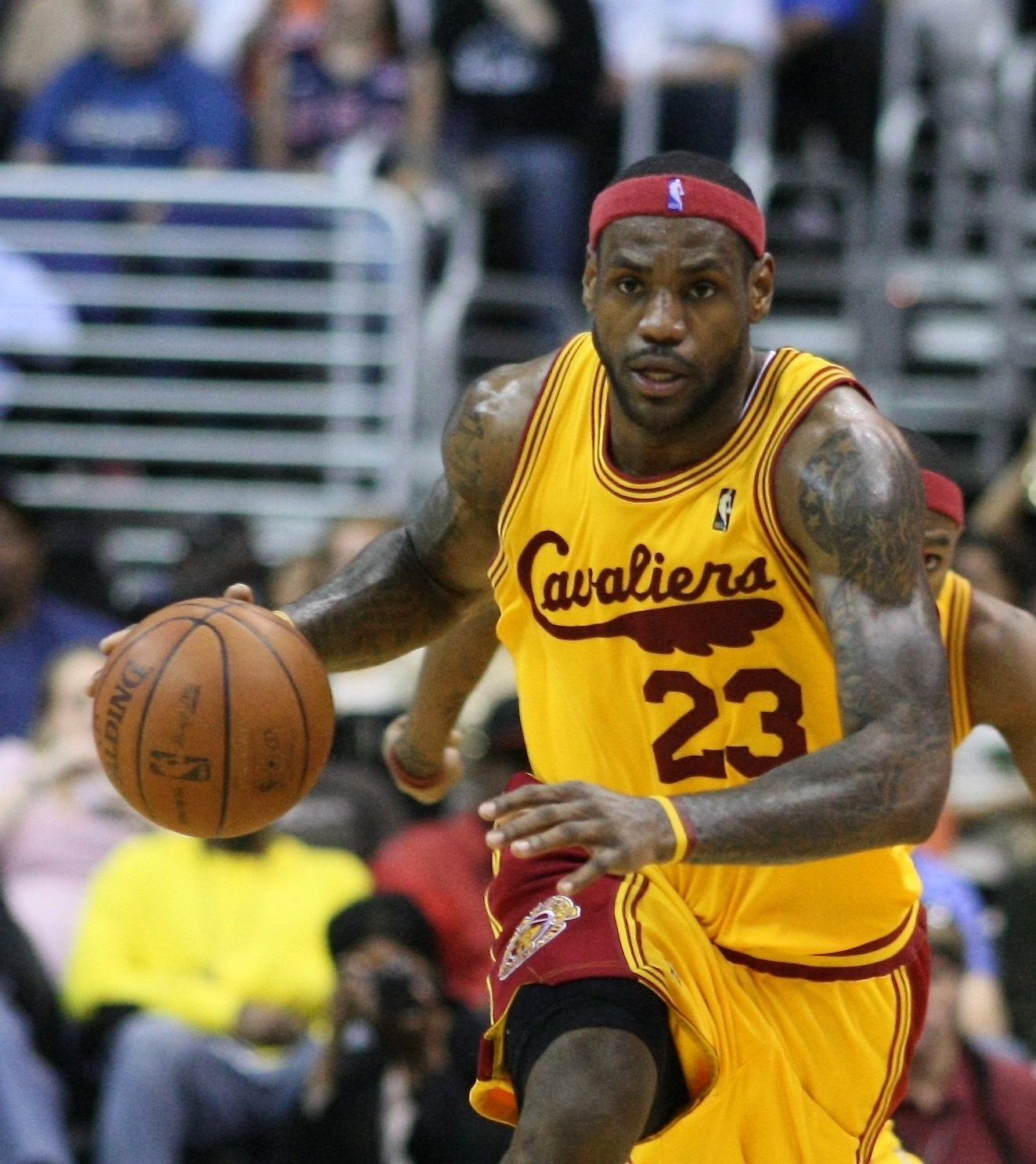
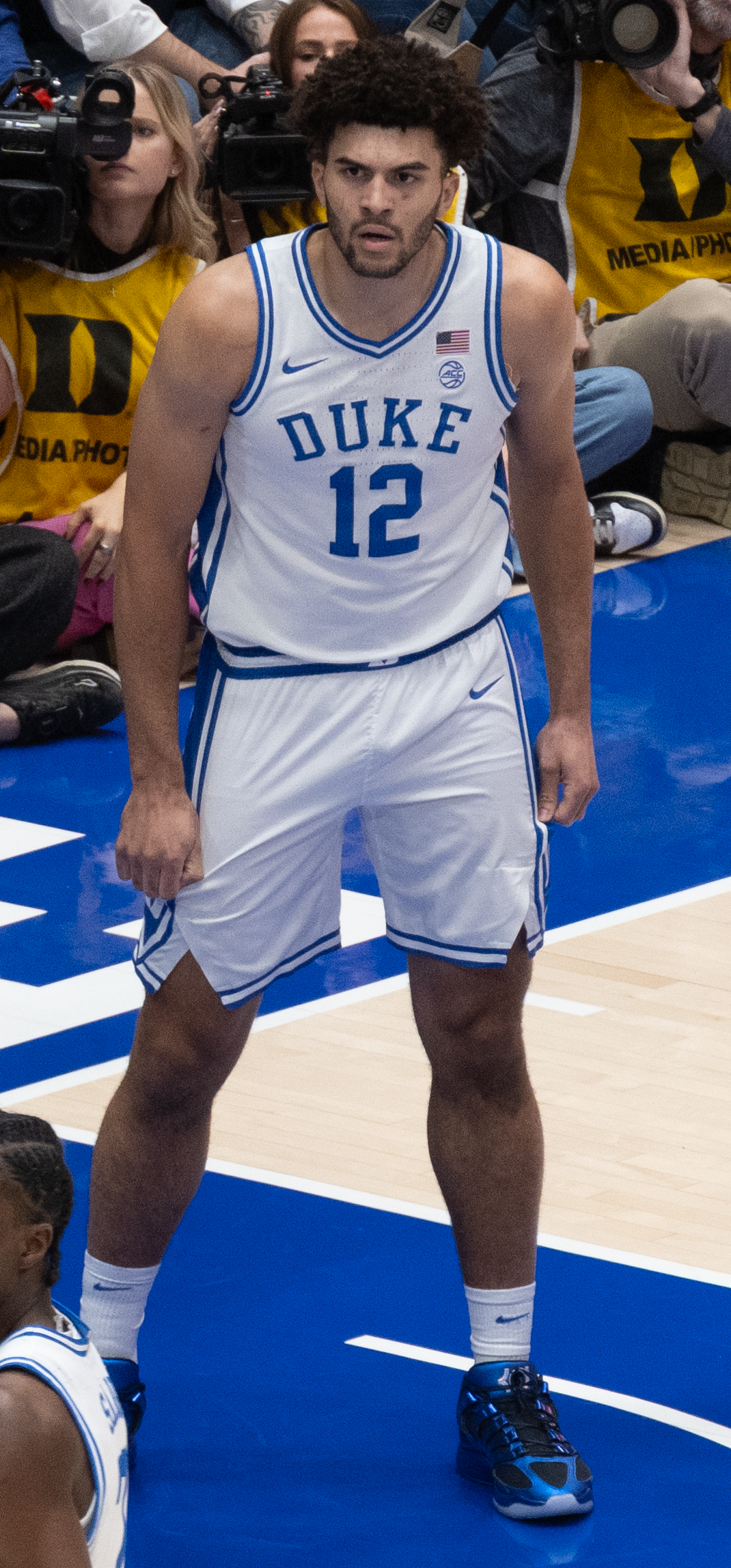
(left to right): LeBron James and Cameron Boozer are the only non-retroactive players to win Mr. Basketball USA twice.

G – Guard
CG – Combo guard
PG – Point guard
SG – Shooting guard
F – Forward
PF – Power forward
SF – Small forward
C – Center
— in Runner(s)-up column indicates years in which the voting procedures and the resulting votes yielded a consensus winner with no runner(s)-up named.
— in College column indicates that player either returned to high school or went directly to professional basketball in the subsequent year.

Mr. Basketball USA Winners
Year	Player	High school	City	Height	Position	College	Runner(s)-up
1996	Mike Bibby	Shadow Mountain	Phoenix, AZ	6' 1"	PG	Arizona	Kobe Bryant, Tim Thomas
1997	Tracy McGrady	Auburndale / Mount Zion	Auburndale, FL / Durham, NC	6' 7"	SF	—	Lamar Odom
1998	Rashard Lewis	Elsik	Houston, TX	6' 10"	F	—	Ronald Curry, JaRon Rush
1999	Jonathan Bender	Picayune	Picayune, MS	6' 11"	F	—	Donnell Harvey
2000	Darius Miles	East St. Louis	East St. Louis, IL	6' 9"	F	—	Zach Randolph, Gerald Wallace
2001	Dajuan Wagner	Camden	Camden, NJ	6' 2"	CG	Memphis	Tyson Chandler, Eddy Curry
2002	LeBron James	St. Vincent – St. Mary	Akron, OH	6' 8"	G	—	Carmelo Anthony
2003	LeBron James (2)	St. Vincent – St. Mary	Akron, OH	6' 8"	G	—	Chris Paul
2004	Sebastian Telfair	Lincoln	Brooklyn, NY	6' 1"	PG	—	Dwight Howard
2005	Monta Ellis	Lanier	Jackson, MS	6' 3"	SG	—	Greg Oden
2006	Greg Oden	Lawrence North	Indianapolis, IN	7' 1"	C	Ohio State	Kevin Durant
2007	O. J. Mayo	Huntington	Huntington, WV	6' 5"	G	USC	Kevin Love, Derrick Rose
2008	Brandon Jennings	Dominguez / Oak Hill Academy	Compton, CA / Mouth of Wilson, VA	6' 1"	PG	—	Samardo Samuels
2009	Derrick Favors	South Atlanta	Atlanta, GA	6' 9"	PF	Georgia Tech	DeMarcus Cousins, Avery Bradley, Jr.
2010	Harrison Barnes	Ames	Ames, IA	6' 7"	SF	North Carolina	Jared Sullinger
2011	Mike Gilchrist	St. Patrick	Elizabeth, NJ	6' 7"	SF	Kentucky	Austin Rivers, Bradley Beal
2012	Shabazz Muhammad	Bishop Gorman	Las Vegas, NV	6' 6"	SF	UCLA	Jabari Parker
2013	Andrew Wiggins	Vaughn / Huntington	Vaughan, ON / Huntington, WV	6' 8"	SF	Kansas	Jabari Parker
2014	Cliff Alexander	Curie	Chicago, IL	6' 9"	PF	Kansas	Stanley Johnson
2015	Ben Simmons	Box Hill Senior / Montverde	Melbourne / Montverde, FL	6' 10"	PF	LSU	Jaylen Brown
2016	Lonzo Ball	Chino Hills	Chino Hills, CA	6' 6"	PG	UCLA	Josh Jackson
2017	Michael Porter Jr.	Father Tolton / Nathan Hale	Columbia, MO / Seattle, WA	6' 10"	SF	Missouri	Deandre Ayton
2018	RJ Barrett	St. Marcellinus / Montverde	Mississauga, ON / Montverde, FL	6' 7"	SG	Duke	Zion Williamson
2019	Isaiah Stewart	McQuaid Jesuit / La Lumiere	Brighton, NY / La Porte, IN	6' 9"	PF	Washington	Cole Anthony
2020	Cade Cunningham	Bowie / Montverde	Arlington, TX / Montverde, FL	6' 7"	PG	Oklahoma State	Evan Mobley, Jalen Green
2021	Chet Holmgren	Minnehaha	Minneapolis, MN	7' 0"	C	Gonzaga	Jabari Smith Jr.
2022	Dariq Whitehead	Montverde	Montverde, FL	6' 5"	SF	Duke	Keyonte George, Dereck Lively
2023	Cameron Boozer	Christopher Columbus High School	Westchester, FL	6' 9"	PF	Duke	Isaiah Collier
2024	Cooper Flagg	Nokomis Regional / Montverde	Newport, ME / Montverde, FL	6' 9"	SF	Duke	Dylan Harper
2025	Cameron Boozer (2)	Christopher Columbus High School	Westchester, FL	6' 9"	PF	Duke	Darryn Peterson
2026	Jordan Smith Jr.	Paul VI Catholic	Chantilly, Virginia	6' 2"	SG	Arkansas	Tyran Stokes

== Retroactive winners ==
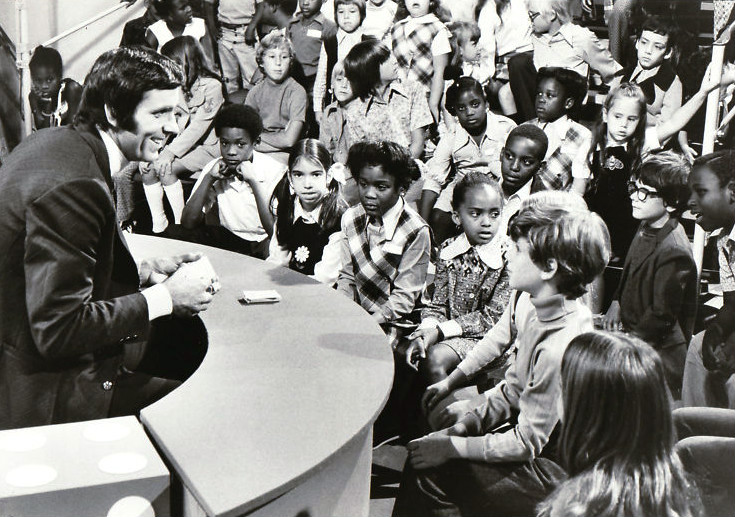
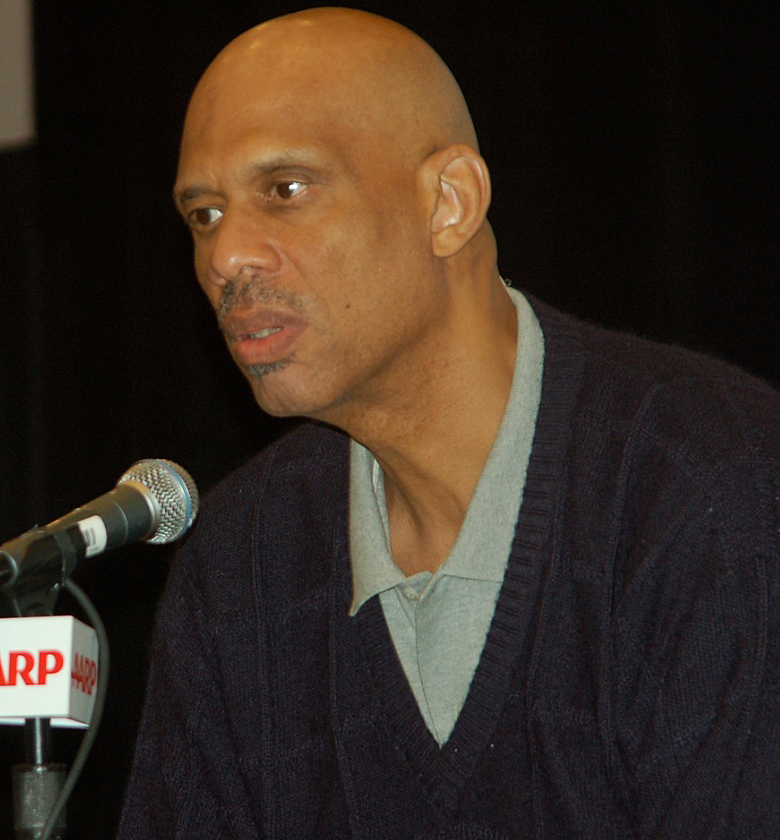
(left to right): Jerry Lucas and Kareem-Abdul Jabbar were the only two players awarded twice retroactively.

G – Guard
CG – Combo guard
PG – Point guard
SG – Shooting guard
F – Forward
PF – Power forward
SF – Small forward
C – Center
— in Runner(s)-up column indicates years in which the voting procedures and the resulting votes yielded a consensus winner with no runner(s)-up named.
— in College column indicates that player either returned to high school or went directly to professional basketball in the subsequent year.

Retroactive Mr. Basketball USA Winners
Year	Player	High school	City	Height	Position	College	Runner(s)-up
1955	Wilt Chamberlain	Overbrook	Philadelphia, PA	7' 1"	C	Kansas	Oscar Robertson
1956	Oscar Robertson	Crispus Attucks	Indianapolis, IN	6' 5"	G	Cincinnati	Kelly Coleman, Jerry West
1957	Jerry Lucas	Middletown	Middletown, OH	6' 8"	F	—	Tony Jackson
1958	Jerry Lucas (2)	Middletown	Middletown, OH	6' 8"	F	Ohio State	Bill McGill, Wayne Hightower
1959	Bill Raftery	St. Cecilia	Kearny, NJ	6' 5"	F	LaSalle	Arthur Heyman
1960	Connie Hawkins	Boys	Brooklyn, NY	6' 9"	C	Iowa	—
1961	Bill Bradley	Crystal City	Crystal City, MO	6' 5"	F	Princeton	Reggie Harding, Billy Cunningham
1962	Cazzie Russell	Carver	Chicago, IL	6' 5"	F	Michigan	John Austin, Larry Conley
1963	Edgar Lacy	Jefferson	Los Angeles, CA	6' 6"	F	UCLA	Lew Alcindor
1964	Kareem Abdul-Jabbar	Power Memorial	New York, NY	7' 1"	C	—	Wes Unseld
1965	Kareem Abdul-Jabbar (2)	Power Memorial	New York, NY	7' 1"	C	UCLA	—
1966	Calvin Murphy	Norwalk	Norwalk, CT	5' 9"	G	Niagara	—
1967	Spencer Haywood	Pershing	Detroit, MI	6' 9"	F	Detroit	Ken Durrett, Jim McDaniels
1968	Paul Westphal	Aviation	Redondo Beach, CA	6' 4"	G	USC	Ralph Simpson
1969	George McGinnis	Washington	Indianapolis, IN	6' 8"	F	Indiana	Kevin Joyce
1970	Tom McMillen	Mansfield	Mansfield, PA	6' 11"	C	Maryland	Bill Walton, Dwight Jones
1971	Maurice Lucas	Schenley	Pittsburgh, PA	6' 9"	F	Marquette	Raymond Lewis, Roscoe Pondexter
1972	Quinn Buckner	Thornridge	Dolton, IL	6' 3"	G	Indiana	Alvan Adams, Phil Sellers
1973	Adrian Dantley	DeMatha	Hyattsville, MD	6' 6"	F	Notre Dame	Kent Benson, Tom LaGarde
1974	Moses Malone	Petersburg	Petersburg, VA	6' 11"	C	—	Skip Wise
1975	Bill Cartwright	Elk Grove	Elk Grove, CA	7' 1"	C	San Francisco	David Greenwood, Darryl Dawkins
1976	Darrell Griffith	Male	Louisville, KY	6' 4"	G	Louisville	Albert King
1977	Albert King	Fort Hamilton	Brooklyn, NY	6' 6"	F	Maryland	Magic Johnson, Gene Banks
1978	Mark Aguirre	Westinghouse	Chicago, IL	6' 6"	F	DePaul	Dwight Anderson
1979	Clark Kellogg	St. Joseph	Cleveland, OH	6' 7"	F	Ohio State	Isiah Thomas, Ralph Sampson
1980	Doc Rivers	Proviso East	Maywood, IL	6' 4"	G	Marquette	Patrick Ewing, Earl Jones
1981	Patrick Ewing	Rindge & Latin	Cambridge, MA	7' 1"	C	Georgetown	—
1982	Wayman Tisdale	Washington	Tulsa, OK	6' 9"	F	Oklahoma	Billy Thompson
1983	Reggie Williams	Dunbar	Baltimore, MD	6' 7"	SF	Georgetown	Dwayne Washington
1984	John Williams	Crenshaw	Los Angeles, CA	6' 9"	SF	LSU	Danny Manning, Delray Brooks
1985	Danny Ferry	DeMatha	Hyattsville, MD	6' 10"	F	Duke	Jeff Lebo
1986	J. R. Reid	Kempsville	Virginia Beach, VA	6' 10"	C	North Carolina	Rex Chapman, Terry Mills
1987	Larry Johnson	Skyline	Dallas, TX	6' 7"	F	UNLV	Marcus Liberty
1988	Alonzo Mourning	Indian River	Chesapeake, VA	6' 10"	C	Georgetown	Shawn Kemp, Billy Owens
1989	Kenny Anderson	Archbishop Molloy	Briarwood, NY	6' 1"	PG	Georgia Tech	—
1990	Damon Bailey	Bedford North Lawrence High School	Bedford, IN	6' 3"	G	Indiana	Ed O'Bannon
1991	Chris Webber	Country Day	Beverly Hills, MI	6' 10"	C	Michigan	Glenn Robinson
1992	Jason Kidd	St. Joseph	Alameda, CA	6' 4"	PG	California	Rodrick Rhodes
1993	Rasheed Wallace	Simon Gratz	Philadelphia, PA	6' 11"	F	North Carolina	Jerry Stackhouse, Randy Livingston
1994	Felipe López	Rice	New York, NY	6' 5"	SG	St. John's	—
1995	Kevin Garnett	Mauldin / Farragut	Mauldin, SC / Chicago, IL	6' 10"	C	—	Ron Mercer, Stephon Marbury

== See also ==
- List of U.S. high school basketball national player of the year awards
- Naismith Prep Player of the Year Award
- Gatorade Player of the Year awards
