= Jordan Smith Jr. =

American basketball player (born 2007)

- Smith Jr. in 2026

No. 23 – Arkansas Razorbacks
- Position: Point guard / shooting guard
- Conference: Southeastern Conference

Personal information
- Born: September 11, 2007 (age 19)
- Listed height: 6 ft 2 in (1.88 m)
- Listed weight: 205 lb (93 kg)

Career information
- High school: Paul VI Catholic (Chantilly, Virginia)
- College: Arkansas (2026–present)

Career highlights
- National high school player of the year (2026); McDonald's All-American (2026)
Medals
Men's basketball
Representing the United States
FIBA Under-19 World Cup
Gold medal – first place	2025 Switzerland	Team
FIBA Under-17 World Cup
Gold medal – first place	2024 Turkey	Team

Jordan Robert Smith Jr. (born September 11, 2007) is an American college basketball player for the Arkansas Razorbacks of the Southeastern Conference (SEC). He was a five-star recruit, earning the 2025 FIBA Under-19 World Cup Defensive MVP and 2026 National High School Player of the Year honors as a senior.

== Early life and high school career ==
Smith was born on September 11, 2007. At age four, he became interested in basketball after watching his father, Jordan Sr., play in a local Washington, D.C. league. He attended Stuart-Hobson Middle School and St. Francis Xavier School in Washington, D.C. before entering Paul VI Catholic High School in Chantilly, Virginia, where he became a top basketball player.

He missed some of his freshman season due to injury, but then led Paul VI Catholic to the Washington Catholic Athletic Conference (WCAC) championship as a sophomore in 2023–24. In 2024–25, Smith averaged 18.9 points, 6.4 rebounds, and 4.0 assists per game while helping Paul VI Catholic to a repeat title, with Smith scoring 29 points in a four-point victory in the championship. For his performance, he was selected MaxPreps Junior All-American and the MaxPreps National Junior of the Year.

Smith also was a top player in the Nike Elite Youth Basketball League (EYBL). A member of Team Takeover, he helped them to the Peach Jam championship in 2022, the Peach Jam title in 2023, and in 2024, averaged 12.1 points and 5.7 rebounds as Takeover reached the semifinals.

In his senior season, Smith averaged 26.6 points, 6.3 rebounds, 5.6 assists and 3.2 steals per game while shooting 56.0 percent from the field, 36.9 percent from 3-point range and 72.4 percent from the free throw line. He led Paul VI to win the City of Palms Classic. Paul VI also won both the WCAC (Washington Catholic Athletic Conference) championship and the VISAA (Virginia Independent Schools Athletic Association) Division 1 State championship. Smith was the consensus national player of the year, winning all of the following awards: Gatorade National Player of the Year, MaxPreps National Basketball Player of the Year, Naismith Prep Player of the Year Award, Mr. Basketball USA, The Sporting News high school basketball player of the year, and the USA Today High School Basketball Player of the Year

=== Recruiting ===
Smith is a five-star recruit and a top-five player nationally in the class of 2026. In December 2025, Smith announced that he had narrowed his college recruitment to Arkansas, Duke, Georgetown, Indiana, Kentucky, and Syracuse. In February 2026, he committed to play college basketball for Arkansas, becoming one of the highest-rated recruits in program history.

College recruiting
Name	Hometown	School	Height	Weight	Commit date
Jordan Smith Jr. SG	Washington, DC	Paul VI Catholic (VA)	6 ft 3 in (1.91 m)	195 lb (88 kg)	Feb 13, 2026
Jordan Smith Jr. SG	Recruit ratings: Rivals: 247Sports: ESPN: (98)				
Overall recruit ranking: Rivals: 3 247Sports: 2 ESPN: 3
Note: In many cases, Scout, Rivals, 247Sports, On3, and ESPN may conflict in their listings of height and weight.; In these cases, the average was taken. ESPN grades are on a 100-point scale.; Sources: "2026 Team Ranking". Rivals.

== International career ==
Smith trained with the United States national under-16 basketball team in 2023. In 2024, he was selected to the U.S. national under-17 team for the 2024 FIBA Under-17 Basketball World Cup, where he helped the U.S. win the gold medal. At the World Cup, Smith averaged 5.9 points and 2.1 rebounds. In June 2025, he was named to the national under-19 team for the 2025 FIBA Under-19 Basketball World Cup, and earned defensive MVP honors.
