= Kaleen =

Kaleen may refer to:

- Kaleen, Australian Capital Territory, a suburb of Canberra
- Kaleen (singer), an Austrian singer, dancer and choreographer

== See also ==
- Kaleena
