= Cameron Boozer =

Professional basketball player (born 2007)

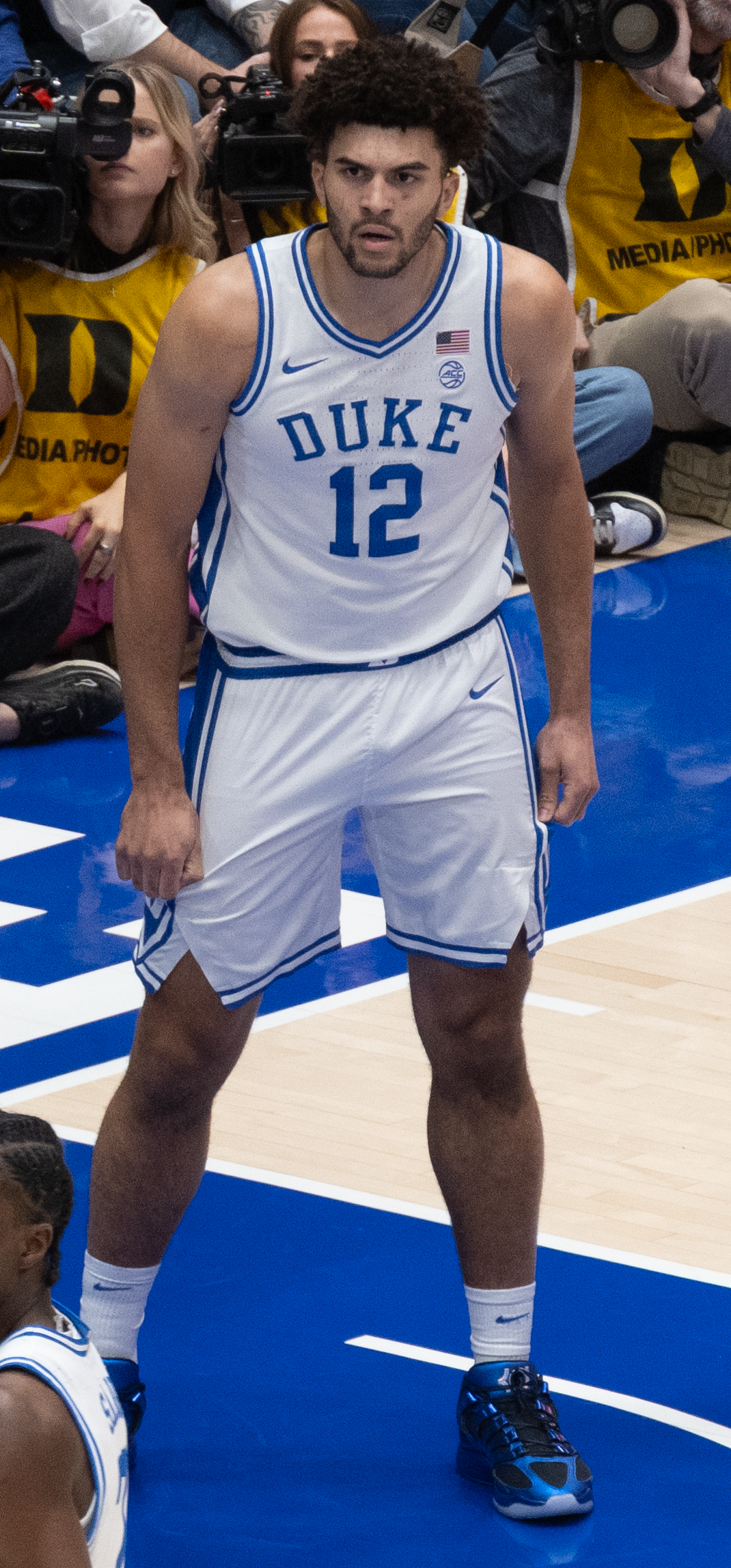
- Boozer playing for Duke in 2026

No. 27 – Memphis Grizzlies
- Position: Power forward
- League: NBA

Personal information
- Born: July 18, 2007 (age 19) Salt Lake City, Utah, U.S.
- Listed height: 6 ft 8 in (2.03 m)
- Listed weight: 250 lb (113 kg)

Career information
- High school: Christopher Columbus (Westchester, Florida)
- College: Duke (2025–2026)
- NBA draft: 2026: 1st round, 3rd overall pick
- Drafted by: Memphis Grizzlies
- Playing career: 2026–present

Career history
- 2026–present: Memphis Grizzlies

Career highlights
- National college player of the year (2026); Consensus first-team All-American (2026); Pete Newell Big Man Award (2026); Karl Malone Award (2026); Lute Olson Award (2026); USBWA National Freshman of the Year (2026); NABC Freshman of the Year (2026); ACC Male Athlete of the Year (2026); ACC Player of the Year (2026); First-team All-ACC (2026); ACC Rookie of the Year (2026); ACC tournament MVP (2026); 2× Mr. Basketball USA (2023, 2025); 2× Gatorade National Player of the Year (2023, 2025); 2× MaxPreps National Basketball Player of the Year (2023, 2025); Morgan Wootten National Player of the Year (2025); Nike Hoop Summit (2025); McDonald's All-American Co-MVP (2025); 3× Florida Mr. Basketball (2023–2025); FIBA Under-17 World Cup MVP (2024); FIBA Under-16 Americas Championship MVP (2023)
- Stats at NBA.com
- Stats at Basketball Reference
Medals
Men's basketball
Representing the United States
FIBA U17 World Cup
Gold medal – first place	2024 Turkey	Team
FIBA Under-16 Americas Championship
Gold medal – first place	2023 Mexico	Team

Cameron Nicholas Boozer (born July 18, 2007) is an American professional basketball player for the Memphis Grizzlies of the National Basketball Association (NBA). Boozer played college basketball for the Duke Blue Devils. He played high school basketball at Christopher Columbus High School and was named the boys' Gatorade National Player of the Year in 2023 and 2025, and is the second-overall recruit in the class of 2025. He is the son of former Duke and NBA player Carlos Boozer. He was selected third overall by the Grizzlies in the 2026 NBA draft.

== Early life and family ==
Boozer was born on July 18, 2007, in Salt Lake City to then Utah Jazz player Carlos Boozer and his then wife CeCe. He grew up in Miami. He has a fraternal twin brother, Cayden, a 5-star recruit point guard also playing for Duke Blue Devils men's basketball. Boozer and his twin brother were conceived via in vitro fertilization after their older brother, Carmani, was diagnosed with sickle cell anemia; stem cells from the twins' umbilical cord blood were later used in Carmani's treatment. Boozer also has a younger sister.

== High school career ==
Boozer attended Christopher Columbus High School in Westchester, Florida. In his sophomore year, he averaged 21.1 points, 11.3 rebounds, 4.2 assists, and two blocks per game, winning a state championship. On March 22, 2023, at the age of 15, Boozer was named the Gatorade National Player of the Year. He won the award for a second time during his senior year at the age of 17. In addition, he was named Florida Mr. Basketball, and Mr. Basketball USA.

Boozer was a consensus five-star recruit and one of the top players in the 2025 class, according to major recruiting services, as was his twin brother. He and his brother both committed to play college basketball at Duke after considering offers from Miami and Florida.

== College career ==
Before the start of his freshman season, Boozer was named to Wooden, Naismith and Malone award preseason watch lists. On November 4, 2025 in his Duke debut, Boozer scored a double double of 15 points and 12 rebounds in a 75-60 win against Texas. On November 14, Boozer scored a career-high 35 points and 12 rebounds in a 100-62 victory over Indiana State. On November 17, Boozer earned Atlantic Coast Conference Rookie and Player of the week honors. On November 23, Boozer scored 26 points and 12 rebounds in a 93-56 win against Howard. On November 27, Boozer put up 35 points and 3 assists in a 80-71 victory over Arkansas. On December 2, Boozer scored 29 points and 6 rebounds in a 67-66 win against Florida. On December 31, Boozer notched a double-double of 26 points and 12 rebounds in a 85-79 win against Georgia Tech.

On January 6, 2026, Boozer scored 27 points, 8 rebounds and 4 assists in a 84-73 win over Louisville. On January 14, Boozer scored a double-double of 21 points and 13 rebounds in a 71-56 victory against California. On January 17, Boozer scored another double-double of 30 points and 14 rebounds in a 80-50 win over Stanford. On January 24, Boozer notched 32 points and 9 rebounds in a 90-59 win against Wake Forest. On January 31, Boozer scored 24 points, 8 rebounds and 5 assists in a 72-58 victory against Virginia Tech. On February 16, Boozer scored 22 points and 12 rebounds in a 101-64 win against Syracuse. On March 7, Boozer scored 26 points, 15 rebounds and 5 assists in a 76-61 win against North Carolina. He was named The Sporting News Men's College Basketball Player of the Year.

During Duke's 73–72 loss to UConn in the Elite Eight on March 29, Boozer sustained multiple fractures around his right eye after taking an elbow to the face, but opted against surgery.

At the end of the season, Boozer was named the Associated Press men's national player of the year, becoming only the fifth freshman to win the award. Boozer finished his freshman season averaging 22.5 points, 10.2 rebounds and 4.1 assists per game, while tying for the national lead with 22 double-doubles. He also established Duke freshman records for rebounds (389) and free throws made (221).

== Professional career ==
On June 23, 2026, Boozer was selected third overall by the Memphis Grizzlies in the 2026 NBA draft.

On October 21, 2026, Boozer made his NBA regular-season debut, recording seven points, 11 rebounds and five assists in a 123–103 victory over the Utah Jazz. On October 29, he recorded his first career triple-double, with 18 points, 12 rebounds and 12 assists in a 124–103 win over the Portland Trail Blazers. At 19 years and 103 days old, Boozer became the second-youngest player in NBA history to achieve the feat, behind Josh Giddey, who was 19 years and 84 days old.

== International career ==
Boozer participated in the 2023 FIBA Under-16 Americas Championship in Mérida, Yucatán. He averaged 16.8 points, 9.8 rebounds, 2.5 steals, and 1.2 assists. He led Team USA to win the gold with an 82-point victory against Canada. Boozer was named the Under-16 Most Valuable Player. In 2024, Boozer helped the United States win the 2024 FIBA Under-17 Basketball World Cup, earning tournament Most Valuable Player honors. He averaged 20.1 points, 9.9 rebounds, 2.0 assists and 2.7 steals per game. In the final against Italy, he recorded 24 points and 13 rebounds in a 129–88 victory.

== Personal life ==
Boozer played for the Duke Blue Devils along with his brother, Cayden. In 2023, Boozer began dating Yva Lauren Cao, a cheerleader for the Miami Hurricanes of the University of Miami.

== Career statistics ==
Legend
GP	Games played	GS	Games started	MPG	Minutes per game
FG%	Field goal percentage	3P%	3-point field goal percentage	FT%	Free throw percentage
RPG	Rebounds per game	APG	Assists per game	SPG	Steals per game
BPG	Blocks per game	PPG	Points per game	**Bold**	Career high

=== College ===
Year	Team	GP	GS	MPG	FG%	3P%	FT%	RPG	APG	SPG	BPG	PPG
2025–26	Duke	38	38	33.5	.556	.391	.789	10.2	4.1	1.4	.6	22.5
