= List of U.S. high school basketball national player of the year awards =

This list contains annual awards given to the top national high school basketball player in the United States.

- (1986–present) Gatorade National Basketball Player of the Year
- (2006–present) MaxPreps National Basketball Player of the Year
- (1955–present) Mr. Basketball USA
- (1997–present) Morgan Wootten National Player of the Year
- (1987–present) Naismith Prep Player of the Year Award
- (1957–2015) Parade High School Basketball Player of the Year
- (1982–present) USA Today High School Basketball Player of the Year
