= Naismith Prep Player of the Year Award =

American high school basketball award

- Awarded for: High school basketball's top male and female player
- Country: United States
- First award: 1987
- Currently held by: Jordan Smith Jr. (Male); Kate Harpring (Female)
- Website: https://naismithtrophy.com/

The Naismith Prep Player of the Year award, named for Canadian basketball inventor James Naismith, is given annually by the Atlanta Tipoff Club to high school basketball's top male and female player. The inaugural awards were given to Dennis Scott and Lynne Lorenzen in 1987.

== Key ==
*	Denotes players inducted to the Basketball Hall of Fame^{†}
Player (X)	Denotes the number of times the player has won the award

^{†}To be considered for induction by a screening committee, a player must be fully retired from play for at least three years.

== Winners ==
=== Male ===
Year	Player	High School	Hometown	State/province	College
1987	Dennis Scott	Flint Hill Prep	Hagerstown	Maryland	Georgia Tech
1988	Alonzo Mourning^{*}	Indian River High School	Chesapeake	Virginia	Georgetown
1989	Kenny Anderson	Archbishop Molloy High School	Jamaica	New York	Georgia Tech
1990	Damon Bailey	Bedford North Lawrence High School	Bedford	Indiana	Indiana
1991	Chris Webber^{*}	Detroit Country Day School	Beverly Hills	Michigan	Michigan
1992	Jason Kidd^{*}	St. Joseph Notre Dame High School	Oakland	California	California
1993	Randy Livingston	Isidore Newman School	New Orleans	Louisiana	LSU
1994	Jerod Ward	Clinton High School	Clinton	Mississippi	Michigan
1995	Ron Mercer	Oak Hill Academy	Nashville	Tennessee	Kentucky
1996	Kobe Bryant^{*}	Lower Merion High School	Ardmore	Pennsylvania	none
1997	Shane Battier	Detroit Country Day School	Beverly Hills	Michigan	Duke
1998	Al Harrington	St. Patrick High School	Elizabeth	New Jersey	none
1999	Donnell Harvey	Randolph-Clay High School	Cuthbert	Georgia	Florida
2000	Gerald Wallace	Childersburg High School	Childersburg	Alabama	Alabama
2001	Dajuan Wagner	Camden High School	Camden	New Jersey	Memphis
2002	Raymond Felton	Latta High School	Latta	South Carolina	North Carolina
2003	LeBron James	St. Vincent - St. Mary High School	Akron	Ohio	none
2004	Dwight Howard^{*}	Southwest Atlanta Christian Academy	Atlanta	Georgia	none
2005	Louis Williams	South Gwinnett High School	Snellville	Georgia	none
2006	Greg Oden	Lawrence North High School	Indianapolis	Indiana	Ohio State
2007	Kevin Love	Lake Oswego High School	Lake Oswego	Oregon	UCLA
2008	Brandon Jennings	Oak Hill Academy	Compton	California	none
2009	Derrick Favors	South Atlanta High School	Atlanta	Georgia	Georgia Tech
2010	Jared Sullinger	Northland High School	Columbus	Ohio	Ohio State
2011	Austin Rivers	Winter Park High School	Winter Park	Florida	Duke
2012	Shabazz Muhammad	Bishop Gorman High School	Summerlin	Nevada	UCLA
2013	Andrew Wiggins	Huntington Prep School	Thornhill	Ontario, Canada	Kansas
2014	Cliff Alexander	Curie High School	Chicago	Illinois	Kansas
2015	Ben Simmons	Montverde Academy	Melbourne	Victoria, Australia	LSU
2016	Lonzo Ball	Chino Hills High School	Chino Hills	California	UCLA
2017	Michael Porter Jr.	Nathan Hale High School (Note: Although Porter graduated from high school in Seattle, he was born and raised in Columbia, Missouri, and attended high school in that city until his father was hired by the University of Washington as an assistant men's basketball coach prior to his senior year.)	Columbia	Missouri	Missouri
2018	RJ Barrett	Montverde Academy	Mississauga	Ontario, Canada	Duke
2019	Isaiah Stewart	La Lumiere School	Rochester	New York	Washington
2020	Cade Cunningham	Montverde Academy	Arlington	Texas	Oklahoma State
2021	Chet Holmgren	Minnehaha Academy	Minneapolis	Minnesota	Gonzaga
2022	Dariq Whitehead	Montverde Academy	Newark	New Jersey	Duke
2023	Isaiah Collier	Wheeler High School	Marietta	Georgia	USC
2024	Cooper Flagg	Montverde Academy	Newport	Maine	Duke
2025	Darryn Peterson	Prolific Prep	Canton	Ohio	Kansas
2026	Jordan Smith Jr.	Paul VI Catholic	Chantilly	Virginia	Arkansas

=== Female ===
Year	Player	High School	Hometown	State	College choice
1987	Lynne Lorenzen	Ventura High School	Ventura	Iowa	Iowa State
1988	Vicki Hall	Brebeuf Jesuit Preparatory School	Indianapolis	Indiana	Texas
1989	Lisa Harrison	Southern High School	Louisville	Kentucky	Tennessee
1990	Lisa Leslie^{*}	Morningside High School	Inglewood	California	Southern Cal
1991	Michelle M. Marciniak	Central Catholic High School	Allentown	Pennsylvania	Notre Dame/ Tennessee
1992	Yolanda Watkins	Decatur High School	Decatur	Alabama	Alabama
1993	La'Keshia Frett	Phoebus High School	Hampton	Virginia	Georgia
1994	Tiffany Gooden	Snider High School	Fort Wayne	Indiana	Iowa
1995	Chamique Holdsclaw^{*}	Christ the King High School	Queens	New York	Tennessee
1996	Kiesha Brown	Woodward Academy	Atlanta	Georgia	Georgia
1997	Tamika Catchings^{*}	Duncanville High School	Duncanville	Texas	Tennessee
1998	Tamika Williams	Chaminade-Julienne High School	Dayton	Ohio	UConn (Note: Officially known for athletic purposes as "Connecticut" until 2013–14.)
1999	Kara Lawson	West Springfield High School	Springfield	Virginia	Tennessee
2000	Diana Taurasi	Don Lugo High School	Chino	California	UConn
2001	Shyra Ely	Ben Davis High School	Indianapolis	Indiana	Tennessee
2002	Ann Strother	Highlands Ranch High School	Highlands Ranch	Colorado	UConn
2003	Candace Parker^{*}	Naperville Central High School	Naperville	Illinois	Tennessee
2004	Candace Parker (2)^{*}	Naperville Central High School	Naperville	Illinois	Tennessee
2005	Courtney Paris	Millennium High School	Piedmont	California	Oklahoma
2006	Maya Moore^{*}	Collins Hill High School	Suwanee	Georgia	UConn
2007	Maya Moore (2)^{*}	Collins Hill High School	Suwanee	Georgia	UConn
2008	Elena Delle Donne^{*}	Ursuline Academy	Wilmington	Delaware	Delaware
2009	Skylar Diggins	Washington High School	South Bend	Indiana	Notre Dame
2010	Chiney Ogwumike	Cy-Fair High School	Cypress	Texas	Stanford
2011	Kaleena Mosqueda-Lewis	Mater Dei High School	Santa Ana	California	UConn
2012	Breanna Stewart	Cicero-North Syracuse High School	Syracuse	New York	UConn
2013	Diamond DeShields	Norcross High School	Norcross	Georgia	North Carolina/ Tennessee
2014	A'ja Wilson	Heathwood Hall Episcopal School	Hopkins	South Carolina	South Carolina
2015	Katie Lou Samuelson	Mater Dei High School	Santa Ana	California	UConn
2016	Jackie Young	Princeton Community High School	Princeton	Indiana	Notre Dame
2017	Megan Walker	Monacan High School	Richmond	Virginia	UConn
2018	Christyn Williams	Central Arkansas Christian High School	Little Rock	Arkansas	UConn
2019	Haley Jones	Archbishop Mitty High School	Santa Cruz	California	Stanford
2020	Paige Bueckers	Hopkins High School	Minnetonka	Minnesota	UConn
2021	Raven Johnson	Westlake High School	Atlanta	Georgia	South Carolina
2022	Kiki Rice	Sidwell Friends School	Bethesda	Washington	UCLA
2023	JuJu Watkins	Sierra Canyon School	Los Angeles	California	USC
2024	Sarah Strong	Grace Christian School	Fuquay-Varina	North Carolina	UConn
2025	Aaliyah Chavez	Monterey High School	Lubbock	Texas	Oklahoma
2026	Kate Harpring	Marist School	Atlanta	Georgia	North Carolina

== See also ==
- List of U.S. high school basketball national player of the year awards
- Gatorade Player of the Year awards
- Mr. Basketball USA
