= Kaleena =

Kaleena is a given name. Notable people with the name include:

- Kaleena Kiff (born 1974), American actress, producer, and director
- Kaleena Mosqueda-Lewis (born 1993), American basketball player
- Kaleena Smith (born 2008), American basketball player

== See also ==
- Kalenna Harper (born 1982), American singer-songwriter, television personality, and record producer
