= Adan Diggs =

American basketball player (born 2008)

No. 1 – Millennium Tigers
- Position: Guard

Personal information
- Born: October 2, 2008 (age 18)
- Listed height: 6 ft 4 in (1.93 m)
- Listed weight: 180 lb (82 kg)

Career information
- High school: Williams Field (Gilbert, Arizona); Millennium (Goodyear, Arizona)
- College: Arizona

Career highlights
- MaxPreps National Sophomore of the Year (2026)
Medals
Men's basketball
Representing United States
FIBA Under-18 AmeriCup
Silver medal – second place	2026 Mexico	Team

Adan Diggs (born October 2, 2008) is an American high school basketball player who attends Millennium High School in Goodyear, Arizona. He is a consensus five-star recruit in the class of 2027 after reclassifying from 2028.

== Early life ==
Diggs was raised by a single mother. His first sport was football, but he decided to focus on basketball at age 11. In eighth grade, Diggs attended Inspire Prep Academy, a brand new school in Gilbert, Arizona, for top middle school prospects. He also played for Arizona Unity at the 2023 USA Club Championship in Rock Hill, South Carolina. Before making his high school basketball debut, Diggs hired an agent to navigate the name, image, and likeness (NIL) process.

== High school career ==
Despite living in Peoria, Diggs chose to enroll at Williams Field High School in Gilbert – not known for its strong basketball program – for his freshman year of high school basketball. He immediately took a leadership role on a team with only two seniors. As a freshman, Diggs averaged 17 points, 5.2 rebounds, and 3.8 assists per game. He led his team in all three categories. Diggs helped Williams Field to an 18–10 record and an Arizona Interscholastic Association (AIA) Open Division state playoff berth. He was named a first-team freshman All-American by MaxPreps, as well as an all-state honorable mention by The Arizona Republic.

Ahead of his sophomore year, Diggs transferred to Millennium High School in Goodyear, Arizona, which was closer to his home and had a more established basketball program. He joined a team with several NCAA Division I prospects, including childhood friend and Arizona Wildcats commit Cameron Holmes. Diggs averaged 22.5 points, 8.0 rebounds, four assists, and three steals per game that season, helping his team to a 24–4 record and an appearance in the AIA Open Division state semifinals, where he scored 31 points (Note: Other sources say 33 points.) in a loss to St. Mary's High School. He also earned tournament MVP honors at the 'Iolani Classic in Hawai'i after helping Millennium beat Owyhee High School of Idaho in the final. Diggs was named the MaxPreps National Sophomore of the Year, and earned first-team all-state honors from The Arizona Republic.

On May 19, 2026, Diggs announced that he would be reclassifying to the class of 2027.

=== Recruiting ===
A consensus five-star recruit, Diggs was initially ranked as one of the top prospects in the class of 2028. He had nine NCAA Division I offers before playing his first high school game. Despite his reclassification to the 2027 class, Diggs remained the top overall recruit according to Rivals.com, and moved into the top five according to 247Sports.

On November 16, 2026 Diggs committed and signed with Arizona.

== Personal life ==
Diggs is of Mexican descent through his maternal grandparents, who were born there.
