= JJ Crawford =

American basketball player (born 2010)

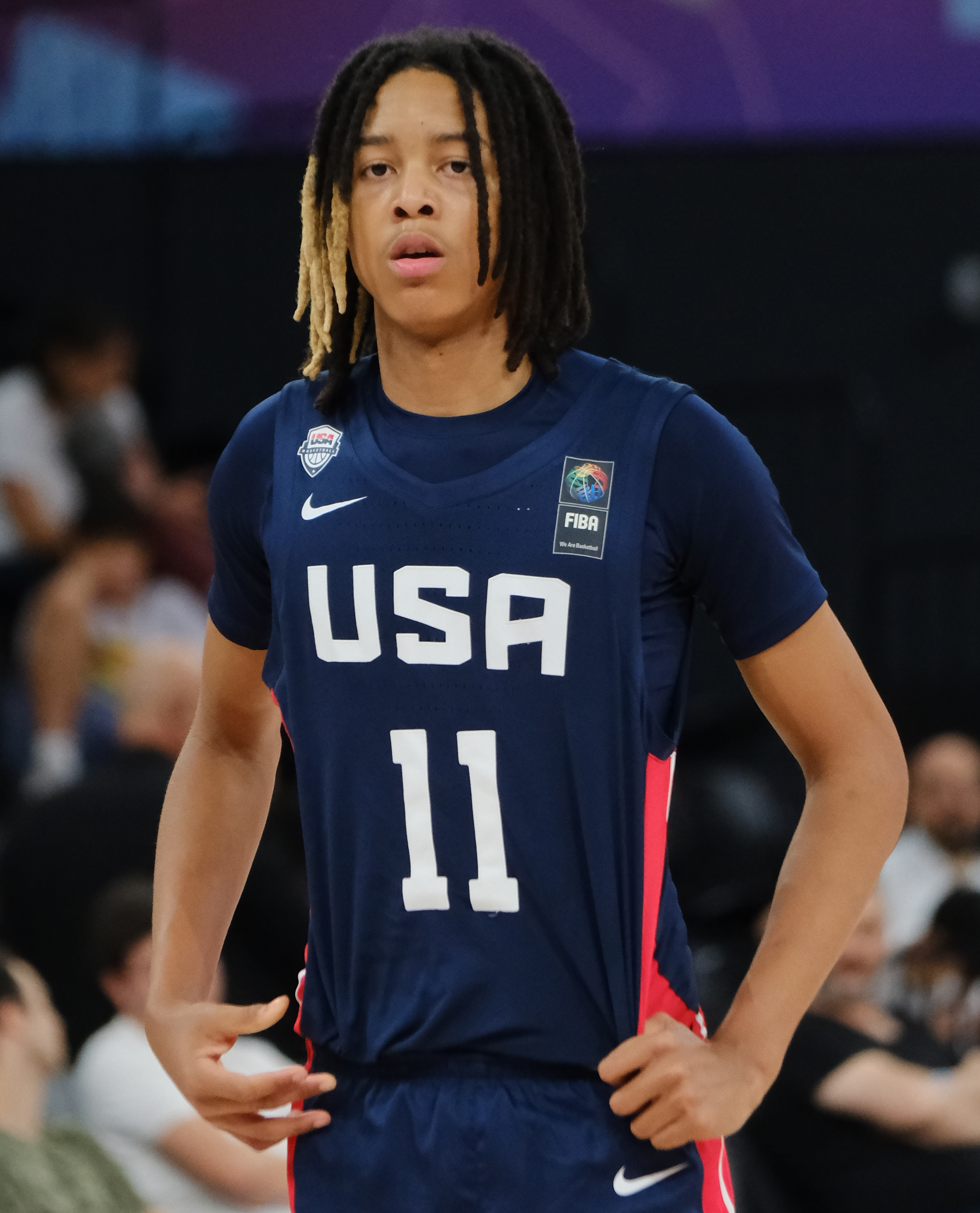
- Crawford in 2026

No. 11 – Rainier Beach Vikings
- Position: Shooting guard

Personal information
- Born: June 5, 2010 (age 16)
- Listed height: 6 ft 5 in (1.96 m)
- Listed weight: 160 lb (73 kg)

Career information
- High school: Rainier Beach (Seattle, Washington)

Career highlights
- MaxPreps National Freshman of the Year (2026)
Medals
Representing the United States
Men's basketball
FIBA Under-17 World Cup
Gold medal – first place	2026 Turkey	Team

Jayen Jamal Crawford (born June 5, 2010) is an American high school basketball player who attends Rainier Beach High School in Seattle, Washington. He is a five-star recruit and the top-ranked player in the class of 2029, earning MaxPreps National Freshman of the Year in 2026. He is the son of 20-year NBA veteran, Jamal Crawford.

== Early life ==
Jayen Jamal Crawford was born on June 5, 2010, the son of Tori Lucas and Jamal Crawford. His parents would marry in 2014 after 13 years in a relationship. As a middle school student, Crawford played for the Seattle Rotary in the Nike EYBL against high school athletes, with his father as the head coach. As a freshman, Crawford enrolled at the same school his father attended, Rainier Beach High School. That season, his father joined long-time head coach Mike Bethea to coach the Vikings. Senior Tyran Stokes, the overall No. 1 player in the class of 2026, transferred from California to join Crawford and Rainier Beach. Before the start of his freshman season, Crawford held 11 NCAA Division I offers, with his first scholarship being offered by Montana while he was in 7th grade. The others were from Arizona State, Kansas, Missouri, Oregon, Rutgers, Sacramento State, San Diego, San Francisco, USC and Washington. In January 2026, he received his 12th offer from his father's alma mater and that season's national champions, Michigan. Crawford helped lead Rainier Beach to a 29–1 record and a class 3A state championship in 2026, averaging 19 points, four rebounds and four assists per game. Following the season, Crawford was selected as a second-team all-state selection across all classes. In addition, he was awarded the MaxPreps National Freshman of the Year. Crawford shared the honor with his cousin, Will Conroy Jr., who he grew up with and played together on the Seattle Rotary before his father Will Conroy moved the family to coach at USC in Los Angeles. Crawford was also anointed a five-star recruit and the No. 1 overall prospect in the class of 2029 by ESPN.

== National team career ==
In October 2025, Crawford attended the USA Basketball Junior National Team minicamp in Colorado Springs, Colorado. In April 2026, he participated in the Junior National Team minicamp in Indianapolis, Indiana. In June, Crawford was invited to join the 36 athlete training camp tryout for a spot on the 12 man roster for the 2026 FIBA Under-17 World Cup in Turkey. He was one of four representatives from the class of 2029, with the others ranging from the class of 2026 onward. He made the United States national team as the only member from the class of 2029.
