= MaxPreps National Basketball Player of the Year awards =

American high school basketball awards

MaxPreps National Basketball Player of the Year
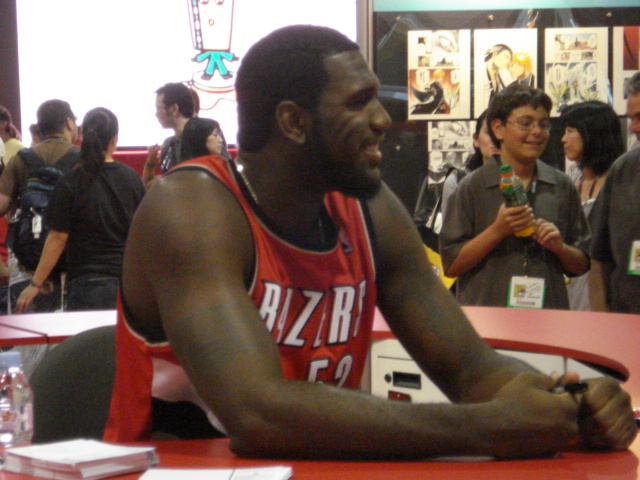
- Greg Oden earned the inaugural National Player of the Year in 2006
- Awarded for: High school basketball's best players
- Presented by: MaxPreps
- First award: 2006
- Currently held by: Jordan Smith Jr. (Boys); Kaleena Smith (Girls)

The MaxPreps National Basketball Player of the Year is an award given to the best high school basketball players in the United States by MaxPreps. It has been awarded at the end of each season since 2006, going to the top male and female performers. In addition to the overall players of the year, they recognize top players from each class by naming a MaxPreps National Junior of the Year, Sophomore of the Year and Freshman of the Year. They also give a "State Player of the Year" award to the best player in each of the fifty U.S. states and D.C.

Cameron Boozer is the only male athlete to win the award twice, and JuJu Watkins is the only female athlete to win twice. Boozer has won the most total awards, winning five, including freshman, sophomore and junior of the year awards. Many winners have gone on to be No. 1 overall draft selections and All-Stars in the NBA and WNBA.

== National Player of the Year ==
=== Boys ===
Year	Player	High school	Hometown	Height	Position	College
2006	Greg Oden	Lawrence North	Indianapolis, IN	7–0	C	Ohio State
2007	Kevin Love	Lake Oswego	Lake Oswego, OR	6–10	C	UCLA
2008	Brandon Jennings	Oak Hill Academy	Compton, CA	6–2	PG	—
2009	Derrick Favors	South Atlanta	Atlanta, GA	6–9	PF	Georgia Tech
2010	Harrison Barnes	Ames	Ames, IA	6–7	SF	North Carolina
2011	Austin Rivers	Winter Park	Winter Park, FL	6–4	SG	Duke
2012	Kyle Anderson	St. Anthony	Jersey City, NJ	6–7	SF	UCLA
2013	Jabari Parker	Simeon Career Academy	Chicago, IL	6–8	SF	Duke
2014	Stanley Johnson	Mater Dei	Santa Ana, CA	6–6	SF	Arizona
2015	Ben Simmons	Montverde Academy	Melbourne, Australia	6–8	PF	LSU
2016	Lonzo Ball	Chino Hills	Chino Hills, CA	6–6	PG	UCLA
2017	Michael Porter Jr.	Nathan Hale	Seattle, WA	6–9	SF	Missouri
2018	R.J. Barrett	Montverde Academy	Mississauga, ON, Canada	6–7	SF	Duke
2019	Sharife Cooper	McEachern	Powder Springs, GA	6–0	PG	Auburn
2020	Cade Cunningham	Montverde Academy	Arlington, TX	6–7	PG	Oklahoma State
2021	Chet Holmgren	Minnehaha Academy	Minneapolis, MN	7–0	PF/C	Gonzaga
2022	Dariq Whitehead	Montverde Academy	Newark, NJ	6–7	SF	Duke
2023	Cameron Boozer	Christopher Columbus	Miami, FL	6-9	PF	Duke
2024	Dylan Harper	Don Bosco Prep	Franklin Lakes, NJ	6-6	PG	Rutgers
2025	Cameron Boozer (2)	Christopher Columbus	Miami, FL	6-9	PF	Duke
2026	Jordan Smith Jr.	Paul VI Catholic	Chantilly, VA	6-2	CG	Arkansas

=== Girls ===
Year	Player	High school	Hometown	Height	Position	College
2006	Jacki Gemelos	St. Mary's	Stockton, CA	6–0	SG	USC
2007	Maya Moore	Collins Hill	Suwanee, GA	6–0	SF	UConn
2008	Nneka Ogwumike	Cy-Fair	Cypress, TX	6–2	PF	Stanford
2009	Skylar Diggins	Washington	South Bend, IN	5–9	PG	Notre Dame
2010	Chiney Ogwumike	Cy-Fair	Cypress, TX	6–3	PF	Stanford
2011	Kaleena Mosqueda-Lewis	Mater Dei	Santa Ana, CA	5–11	SF	UConn
2012	Breanna Stewart	Cicero-North Syracuse	Cicero, NY	6–7	SF	UConn
2013	Diamond DeShields	Norcross	Norcross, GA	6–1	SG	North Carolina
2014	A'ja Wilson	Heathwood Hall Episcopal	Columbia, SC	6–4	PF	South Carolina
2015	Ali Patberg	Columbus North	Columbus, IN	5–10	PG/SG	Notre Dame
2016	Sabrina Ionescu	Miramonte	Orinda, CA	5–11	PG	Oregon
2017	Megan Walker	Monacan	Richmond, VA	6–1	SF	UConn
2018	Christyn Williams	Central Arkansas Christian	North Little Rock, AR	5–11	PG	UConn
2019	Azzi Fudd	St. John's	Washington, DC	5–11	SG	UConn
2020	Paige Bueckers	Hopkins	Minnetonka, MN	5–11	PG	UConn
2021	Raven Johnson	Westlake	Atlanta, GA	5–10	PG	South Carolina
2022	JuJu Watkins	Sierra Canyon	Los Angeles, CA	6–2	PG/SG	USC
2023	JuJu Watkins (2)	Sierra Canyon	Los Angeles, CA	6–2	PG/SG	USC
2024	Jaloni Cambridge	Montverde	Nashville, TN	5–6	PG	Ohio State
2025	Aaliyah Chavez	Monterey	Lubbock, TX	5–10	PG	Oklahoma
2026	Kaleena Smith	Ontario Christian	Ontario, CA	5–6	PG	Undecided

== Junior of the Year ==
*	Also named MaxPreps Player of the Year

=== Boys ===
Year	Player	High school	Hometown	Height	Position	College
2010	Austin Rivers	Winter Park	Winter Park, FL	6–4	SG	Duke
2011	Tony Parker	Miller Grove	Lithonia, GA	6–9	C	UCLA
2012	Jabari Parker	Simeon Career Academy	Chicago, IL	6–8	SF	Duke
2013	Stanley Johnson	Mater Dei	Santa Ana, CA	6–7	SF	Arizona
2014	Ben Simmons	Montverde Academy	Melbourne, Australia	6–8	PF	LSU
2015	Jayson Tatum	Chaminade	Creve Coeur, MO	6–8	SF	Duke
2016	Kevin Knox II	Tampa Catholic	Tampa, FL	6–8	SF	Kentucky
2017	Zion Williamson	Spartanburg Day	Spartanburg, SC	6–8	SF	Duke
2018	Vernon Carey Jr.	University	Fort Lauderdale, FL	6–10	C	Duke
2019	Sharife Cooper*	McEachern	Powder Springs, GA	6–0	PG	Auburn
2020	Paolo Banchero	O'Dea	Seattle, WA	6–9	PF	Duke
2021	Jalen Duren	Montverde Academy	Montverde, FL	6–9	PF/C	Memphis
2022	Ron Holland	Duncanville	Duncanville, TX	6-8	SF	—
2023	Tre Johnson	Lake Highlands	Dallas, TX	6-5	SG	Texas
2024	Cameron Boozer	Christopher Columbus	Miami, FL	6-9	PF	Duke
2025	Jordan Smith Jr.	Paul VI Catholic	Chantilly, VA	6-2	CG	Arkansas
2026	Cayden Daughtry	Calvary Christian	Boynton Beach, FL	6-0	PG	Undecided

== Sophomore of the Year ==
*	Also named MaxPreps Player of the Year

=== Boys ===
Year	Player	High school	Hometown	Height	Position	College
2010	DaJuan Coleman	Jamesville-DeWitt	DeWitt, NY	6–9	C	Syracuse
2011	Aquille Carr	Patterson	Baltimore, MD	5–6	PG	—
2012	Andrew Wiggins	Huntington Prep	Thornhill, ON, Canada	6–7	SF	Kansas
2013	Malik Newman	Callaway	Jackson, MS	6–4	SG	Mississippi State
2014	Josh Jackson	Consortium	Detroit, MI	6–8	SF	Kansas
2014	Jayson Tatum	Chaminade	Creve Coeur, MO	6–8	SF	Duke
2015	M. J. Walker	Jonesboro	Jonesboro, GA	6–5	SG	Florida State
2016	Romeo Langford	New Albany	New Albany, IN	6–5	SG	Indiana
2017	R.J. Barrett	Montverde Academy	Mississauga, ON, Canada	6–7	SF	Duke
2018	Jalen Green	San Joaquin Memorial	Fresno, CA	6–6	SG	—
2019	Jonathan Kuminga	Our Savior New American	Centereach, NY	6–8	SF	—
2020	Emoni Bates	Lincoln	Ypsilanti, MI	6–9	SF	Memphis
2021	D.J. Wagner	Camden	Camden, NJ	6–3	SG	Kentucky
2022	Ian Jackson	Cardinal Hayes	The Bronx, NY	6–5	SG	North Carolina
2023	Cameron Boozer*	Christopher Columbus	Miami, FL	6-9	PF	Duke
2024	Brandon McCoy Jr.	St. John Bosco	Oakland, CA	6-5	SG	Michigan
2025	Scottie Adkinson	Webster Groves	St. Louis, MO	6-4	CG	Missouri
2026	Adan Diggs	Millenium	Gilbert, AZ	6-4	CG	Undecided

== Freshman of the Year ==
*	Also named MaxPreps Player of the Year

=== Boys ===
Year	Player	High school	Hometown	Height	Position	College
2010	Aquille Carr	Patterson	Baltimore, MD	5–6	PG	—
2011	Trey Lyles	Arsenal Technical	Indianapolis, IN	6–10	PF	Kentucky
2012	Malik Newman	Callaway	Jackson, MS	6–4	SG	Mississippi State
2013	Harry Giles	Wesleyan Christian Academy	High Point, NC	6–8	PF	Duke
2014	Cody Riley	Sierra Canyon	Chatsworth, CA	6–9	PF	UCLA
2015	Marvin Bagley III	Corona del Sol	Tempe, AZ	6–10	PF	Duke
2016	LaMelo Ball	Chino Hills	Chino Hills, CA	6–5	PG	—
2016	Onyeka Okongwu	Chino Hills	Chino Hills, CA	6–9	C	USC
2017	Kyree Walker	Moreau Catholic	Hayward, CA	6–5	SF	—
2018	Zion Harmon	Adair County	Columbia, KY	5–10	PG	Western Kentucky
2019	Emoni Bates	Lincoln	Ypsilanti, MI	6–8	SF	Memphis
2020	Mikey Williams	San Ysidro	San Diego, CA	6–2	PG	UCF
2021	Derik Queen	St. Frances Academy	Baltimore, MD	6–8	PF	Maryland
2022	Cameron Boozer	Christopher Columbus	Miami, FL	6–8	PF	Duke
2023	Jason Crowe Jr.	Lynwood	Los Angeles, CA	6–3	PG	Missouri
2024	Gene Roebuck	La Mirada	La Mirada, CA	6–5	SF	Undecided
2025	Jakyi Miles	Mesa	Mesa, AZ	6–4	PG	Undecided
2026	Will Conroy Jr.	Village Christian	Seattle, WA	6–0	PG	Undecided
2026	JJ Crawford	Rainier Beach	Seattle, WA	6–5	SG	Undecided

== State winners ==
For the official list of state winners from 2020 until the present, see:

Boys	Girls
2020	2020
2021	2021
2022	2022
2023	2023
2024	2024
2025	2025
2026	2026
