= Jamal Crawford =

American basketball player (born 1980)

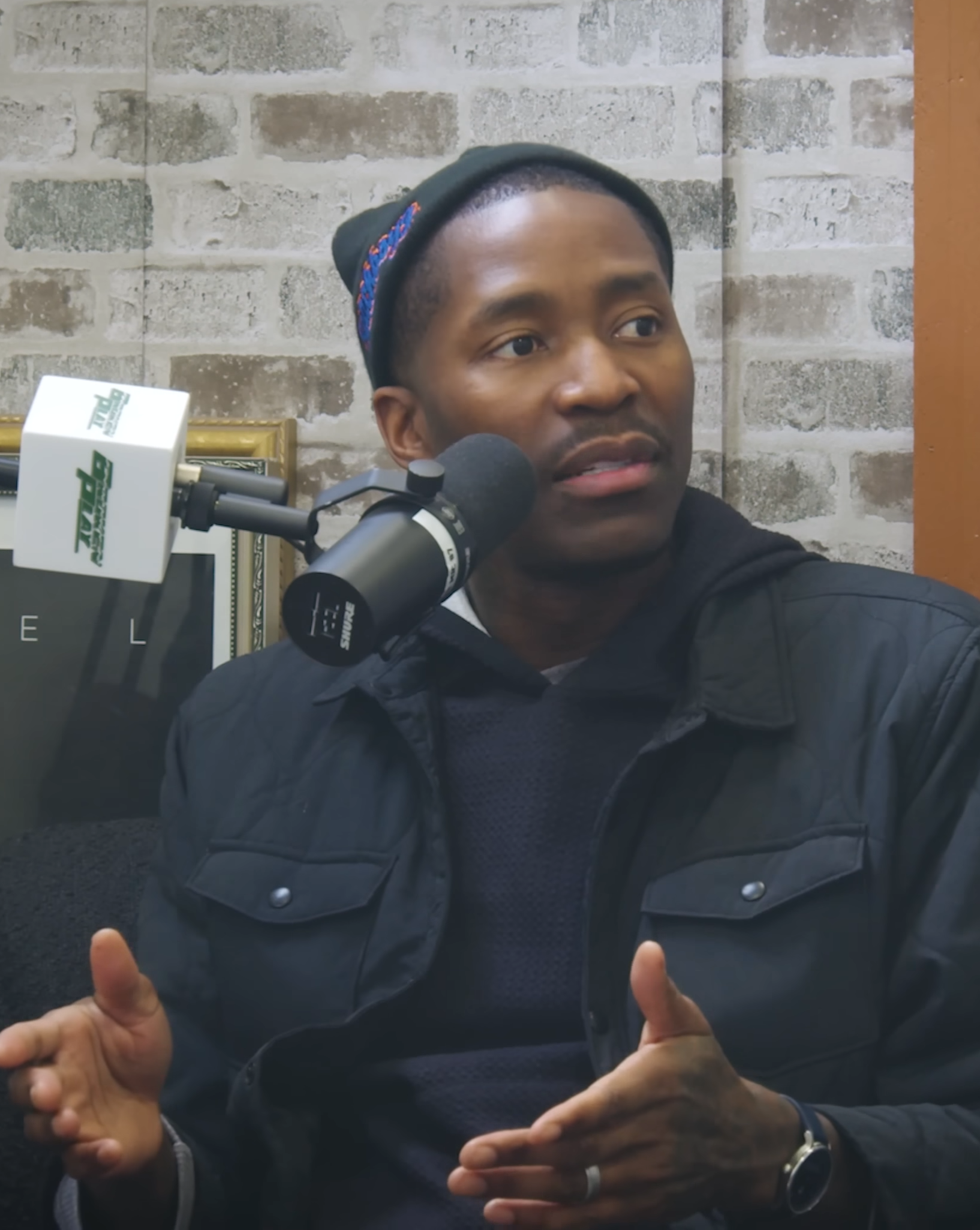
- Crawford in 2023

Personal information
- Born: March 20, 1980 (age 46) Seattle, Washington, U.S.
- Listed height: 6 ft 5 in (1.96 m)
- Listed weight: 200 lb (91 kg)

Career information
- High school: Rainier Beach (Seattle, Washington)
- College: Michigan (1999–2000)
- NBA draft: 2000: 1st round, 8th overall pick
- Drafted by: Cleveland Cavaliers
- Playing career: 2000–2020
- Position: Shooting guard
- Number: 1, 11, 6

Career history
- 2000–2004: Chicago Bulls
- 2004–2008: New York Knicks
- 2008–2009: Golden State Warriors
- 2009–2011: Atlanta Hawks
- 2011–2012: Portland Trail Blazers
- 2012–2017: Los Angeles Clippers
- 2017–2018: Minnesota Timberwolves
- 2018–2019: Phoenix Suns
- 2020: Brooklyn Nets

Career highlights
- 3× NBA Sixth Man of the Year (2010, 2014, 2016); Second-team Parade All-American (1999)

Career statistics
- Points: 19,419 (14.6 ppg)
- Rebounds: 2,948 (2.2 rpg)
- Assists: 4,541 (3.4 apg)
- Stats at NBA.com
- Stats at Basketball Reference

Aaron Jamal Crawford (born March 20, 1980) is an American former professional basketball player who played in the National Basketball Association (NBA) from 2000 to 2020. Nicknamed "J-Crossover", he is regarded as one of the best ball handlers in NBA history. Also regarded as one of the best sixth men in league's history, Crawford was named NBA Sixth Man of the Year three times, a record he shares with Lou Williams.

Among other distinctions, Crawford was once the NBA’s all-time leader in career four-point plays. On April 9, 2019, he became not only the oldest player to score 50+ points in an NBA game, but also the first player to have 50-point outings with four franchises. The 51-point tally also reached the most points ever scored by a reserve. In NBA history, Crawford ranks 30th with four 50+ point games accrued (tied with 11 others, including George Mikan and Larry Bird) and 13th all-time in career three-point field goals made (2,221). Crawford is the second player in NBA history to have scored 10,000+ career points off the bench. In 2021, he began providing commentary on NBA League Pass, The NBA on TNT until 2024, and on select games of MSG Network's coverage of the New York Knicks starting in 2024.

== High school career ==
Growing up in South Seattle, Crawford played for Rainier Beach High, a school that has produced a number of other NBA and college players such as Doug Christie, Nate Robinson, Terrence Williams, Kevin Porter Jr., and Dejounte Murray. Jamal led the Vikings to capture the 1998 Washington Interscholastic Activities Association (WIAA) State Championship. In 2001, Rainier Beach retired his number 23 jersey to commemorate his impact; and in 2018, it inducted him into its Hall of Fame to honor his legacy.

== College career ==
Having earned a scholarship to the University of Michigan, Crawford committed to play college basketball with the Wolverines under coach Brian Ellerbe. At the start of the 1999–00 season, however, he incurred a six-game suspension from the National Collegiate Athletic Association (NCAA); it retroactively ruled that his high school living arrangement had breached its bylaws on amateurism. (Note: The NCAA alleged that Crawford, with his mother’s permission, had lived with a Seattle businessman who was not his legal guardian for the three years he attended Rainer Beach High School. The NCAA charged that the living arrangement could be likened to an athlete having a sponsor, which its rules forbid. Although unsuccessfully, the University of Michigan protested that the ruling misconstrued his pre-college situation. "We certainly understand the reason for the NCAA's rules regarding amateurism," said Marvin Krislov, university vice president and general counsel. "But there are compelling reasons why Jamal's situation is different and we will present them to the NCAA.") The controversial ruling was protested by the university, although to no avail. After the suspension, Crawford joined the starting lineup and went on to average 16.6 points, 4.5 assists, and 2.8 rebounds on the season. Following his freshman campaign, he declared for the 2000 NBA draft.. Note: Jamal only played the first 15 games of Michigan’s 2000 season

== Professional career ==
=== Chicago Bulls (2000–2004) ===
Crawford was selected 8th overall in the 2000 NBA draft by the Cleveland Cavaliers but was then traded to the Chicago Bulls in a draft-day deal that included the rights to Chris Mihm. In his first year as a Bull, in 2000–01, Crawford struggled with his shot, converting only 35.2 percent from the field. Even so, the rookie was able to score in double-digits 10 times. He averaged 4.6 points, 1.5 rebounds, and 2.3 assists across 61 games (8 starting).

In his second NBA season, 2001–02, injury limited Crawford to 23 games (6 starting). Nevertheless, he improved across nearly all statistical categories by averaging 9.3 points, 1.5 rebounds, and 2.4 assists as well as by converting 44.8 percent of his attempts from behind the arc.

In his third campaign with the Bulls, 2002–03, Crawford emerged as a key component of coach Bill Cartwright's offense. His per-game averages improved further to 10.7 points, 2.3 rebounds, 4.2 assists, and 1 steal across 80 games (31 starting). The Bulls would miss the playoffs with a 30–52 record.

His fourth NBA season, 2003–04, would be his last in Chicago. Promoted to starting shooting guard, Crawford averaged 17.3 points, 3.5 rebounds, 5.1 assists, and 1.4 steals per contest. On April 11, 2004, he came away with 50 points against the Toronto Raptors in his third to last game as a Bull. The Bulls won in overtime, 114–108, but not before Crawford made 6 three-pointers and recorded 24 points in the fourth quarter alone. Before the start of the 2004–05 season, he was traded, along with Jerome Williams, to the New York Knicks in exchange for Dikembe Mutombo, Othella Harrington, Frank Williams, and Cezary Trybanski.

=== New York Knicks (2004–2008) ===
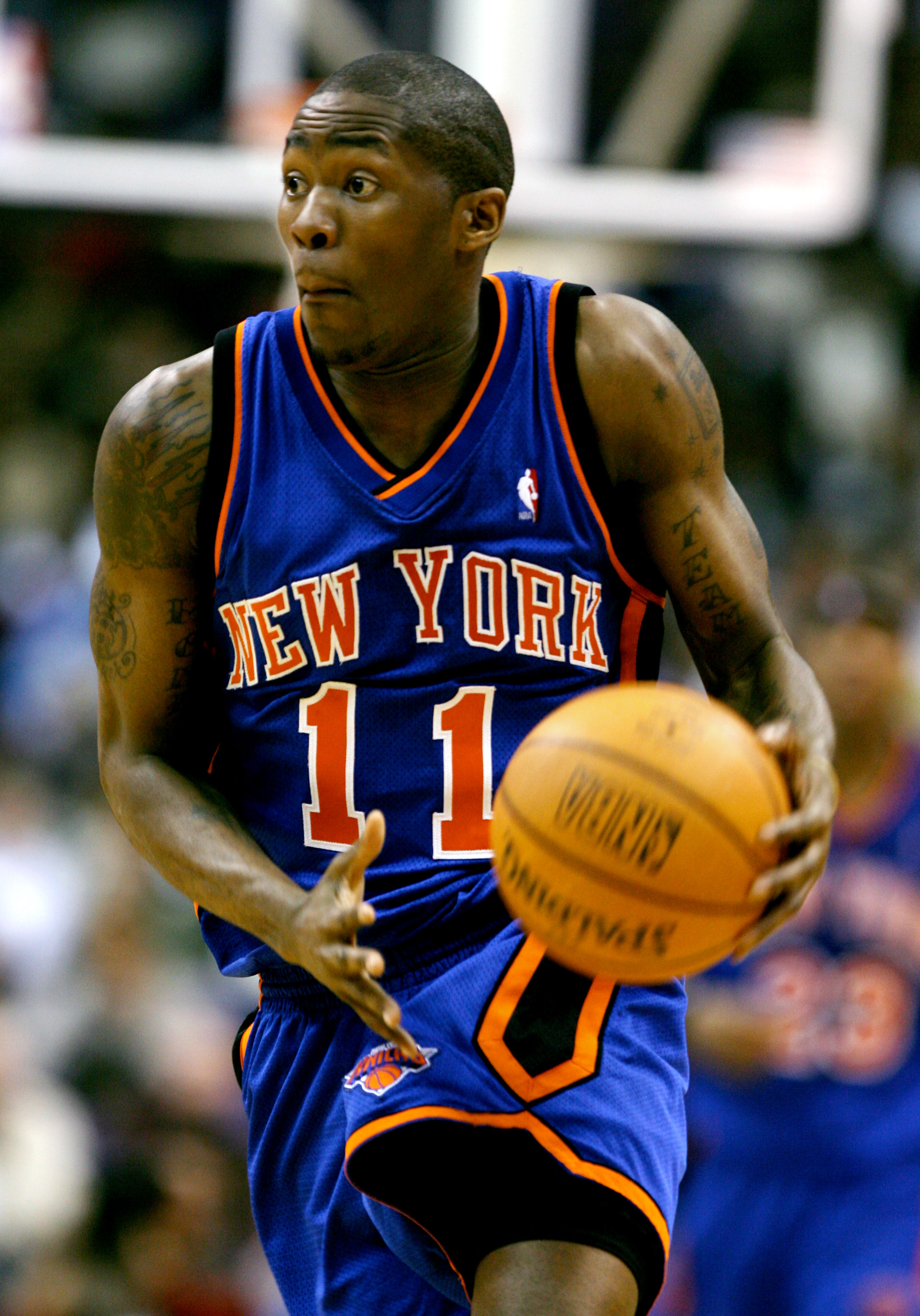
Crawford with the New York Knicks

Crawford joined another young and rebuilding team in the New York Knicks. In his first year with the franchise, the 2004–05 season, he played 70 games (67 starting) and averaged 17.7 points, 2.9 rebounds, 4.3 assists, and 1.4 steals per contest. His scoring exceeded 20 points in many games, to include a notable win over the Charlotte Bobcats on December 4 where he had 41 points on 17-of-25 shooting. The Knicks would fall short of the playoffs.

In his second year in New York City, the 2005–06 season, he took a reduced sixth man role under head coach Larry Brown. Though it took some time, Crawford ended up embracing the new role. He average 14.3 points, 3.1 rebounds, and 3.8 assists across 79 games (27 starting). The Knicks, with a record of 23–59, fell short of the playoffs.

Deciding to go in a new direction in 2006–07, the Knicks replaced Larry Brown with Isiah Thomas as head coach, the team's fourth replacement of that position in three years. Crawford was limited to 59 games (36 starting) due to an ACL injury; but he averaged 17.6 points, 3.2 rebounds, and 4.4 assists on the season.

In 2007–08, he was put back in the starting lineup for all 80 games that he played. He averaged 20.6 points, 2.6 rebounds, and 5 assists. Crawford provided the 23–59 Knicks with one of the few bright spots on January 26, 2007: He scored a career-high 52 points, with 16 of his shots being made consecutively and 8 of his three-pointers being one short of the franchise record set in 2002 by Latrell Sprewell.

In 2008–09, he would play only 11 games for the Knicks before being dealt to the Golden State Warriors in a trade for Al Harrington.

=== Golden State Warriors (2008–2009) ===
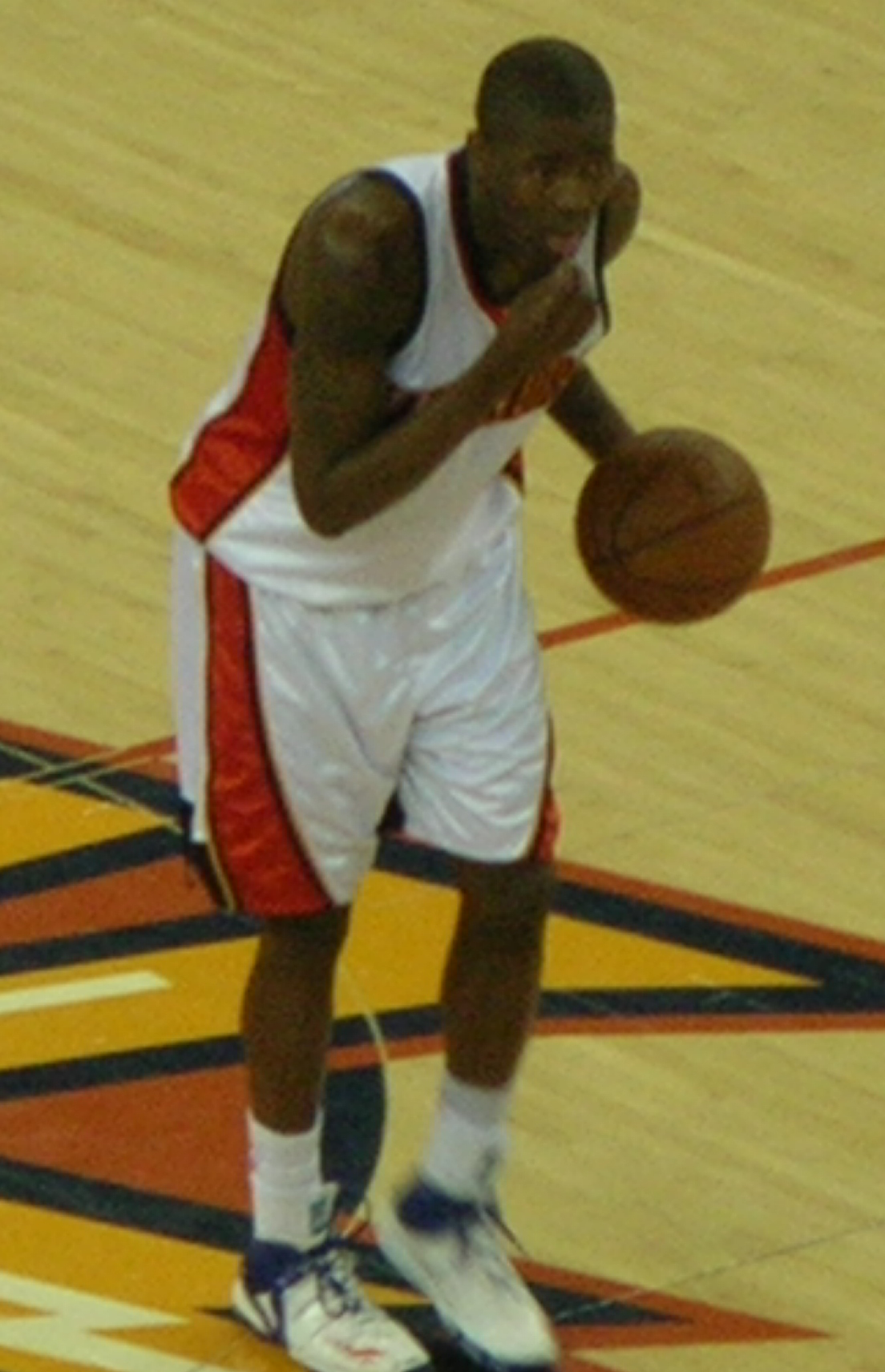
Crawford with the Warriors

Crawford proved an ideal fit in the run-and-gun offense of coach Don Nelson due to his three-point shooting and ball-handling ability as well as court-vision. He played in 54 games for the Warriors in 2008–09 and started in each one. Crawford averaged nearly 20 points per contest as well as 4.4 assists and 1.5 rebounds. During a 110–103 victory over the Charlotte Bobcats on December 20, 2008, Crawford scored 50 points; thus he became the fourth player in NBA history—after only Wilt Chamberlain, Bernard King, and Moses Malone—to score 50+ points with three teams. At the end of the season, the Atlanta Hawks acquired Crawford in a trade for guards Acie Law and Speedy Claxton.

=== Atlanta Hawks (2009–2011) ===
Crawford joined the Atlanta Hawks for their 2009–10 season. On January 15, he made a three-point shot at the buzzer to clinch a 102–101 victory over the Phoenix Suns. In a win over the Los Angeles Clippers on February 3, 2010, Crawford set an all-time NBA record for most career four-point plays, surpassing Reggie Miller. Backing up All-Star guard Joe Johnson and Mike Bibby, he averaged 18 points, 2.5 rebounds, and 2 assists off the bench. Crawford was a leading candidate for the NBA Sixth Man of the Year Award and won the award in 2010. The Hawks, led by Joe Johnson, Josh Smith, Al Horford, Mike Bibby, as well as by Crawford, qualified for the playoffs; this clinching was to be his first trip to the playoffs. The Hawks would advance past the Milwaukee Bucks in seven games. Crawford led all scorers in the decisive game seven with 22 points. The team was subsequently swept by the Orlando Magic with a prime Dwight Howard at its helm.

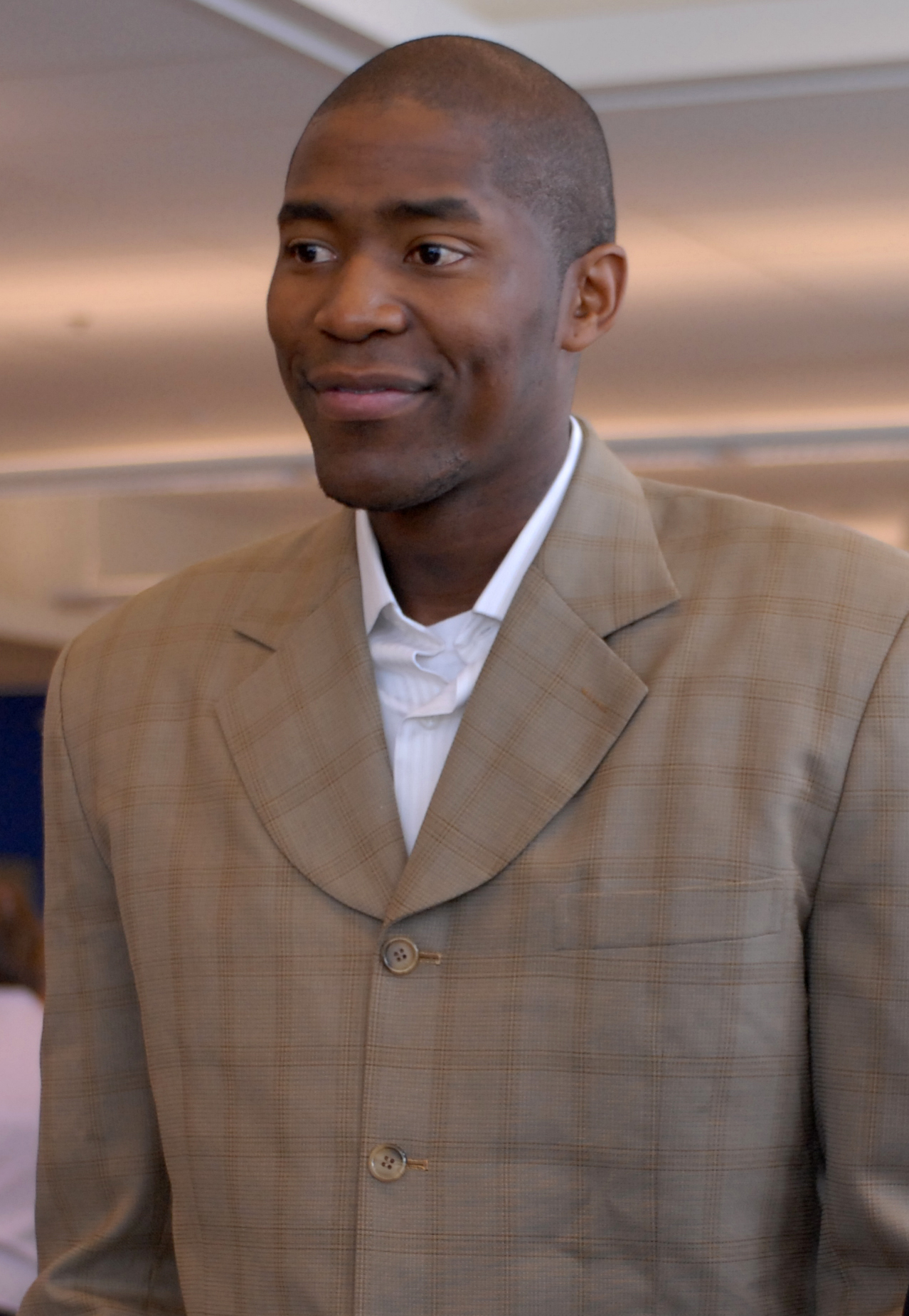
Crawford in 2011

In the 2010–11 season, the Hawks fired coach Mike Woodson to bring on Larry Drew. Though Crawford was coming off the bench and saw his averages decline from 2009–10, he had a solid season of averaging 14.2 points, 1.7 rebounds, and 3.2 assists per game. He was yet again in consideration for the Sixth Man of the Year Award. Having made it to the playoffs as the 5th seed in the Eastern Conference, the Hawks beat the Orlando Magic in a close series, but not before Crawford made the game-clinching three-pointer with six seconds left in Game 3. Thus the Hawks advanced to the conference semifinals, though they were then eliminated by the Chicago Bulls in six games.

=== Portland Trail Blazers (2011–2012) ===
Crawford signed a two-year, $10.2 million contract with the Portland Trail Blazers on December 15, 2011. He averaged nearly 14 points in 60 games while leading the league in free throw percentage with a career-high 92.7 percent in the lockout-shortened season.

=== Los Angeles Clippers (2012–2017) ===
On July 11, 2012, Crawford signed a four-year, $21.35 million contract with the Los Angeles Clippers.

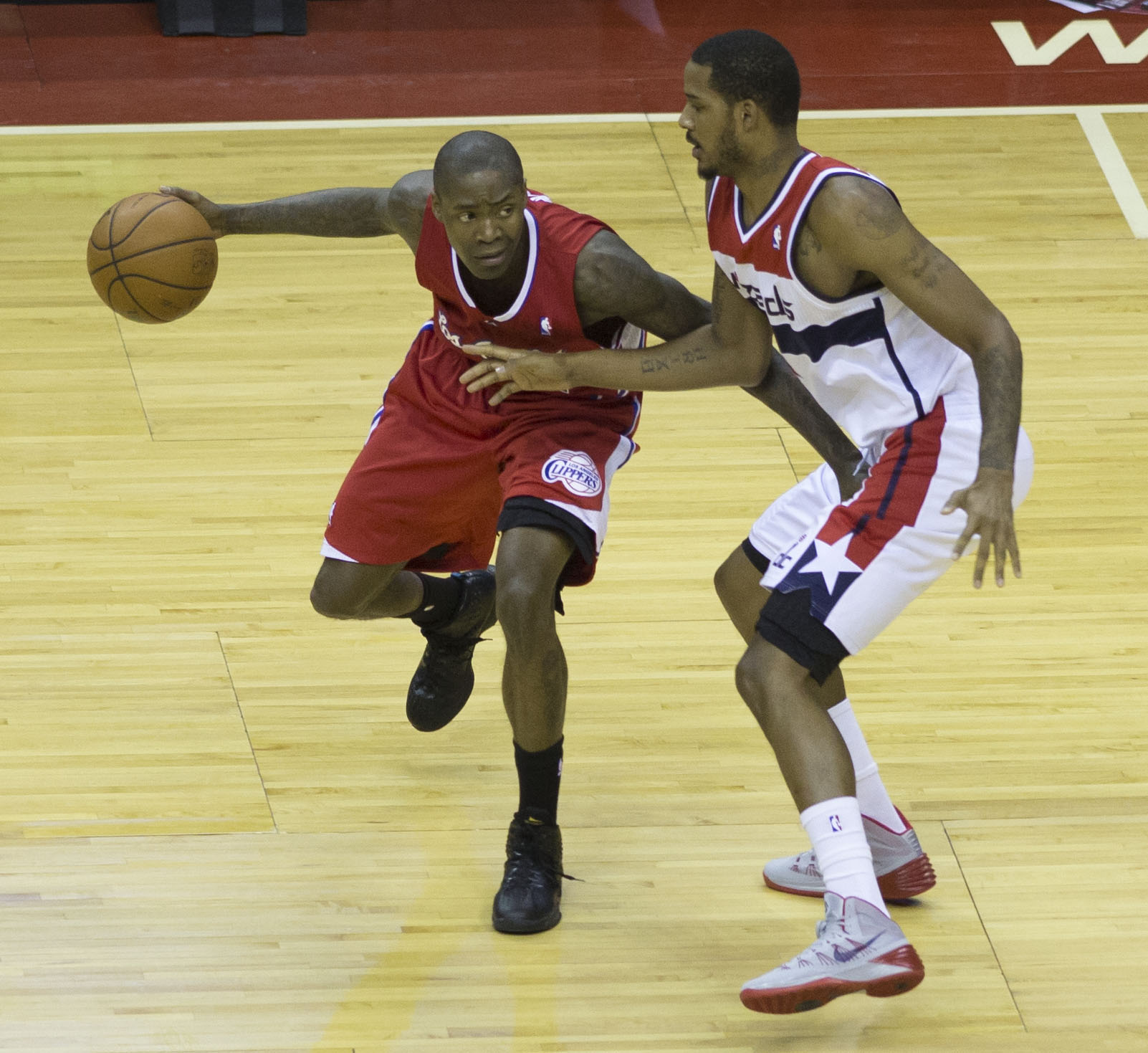
Crawford being defended by Trevor Ariza

In the 2012–13 season, Crawford posted 16.5 points, 1.7 rebounds, 2.5 assists, and 29.3 minutes in the 76 games he played. He also finished 2nd place in voting for the 2013 NBA Sixth Man of the Year Award, edged out by J. R. Smith. In the opening round of the playoffs, the Clippers were defeated by the Memphis Grizzlies in six games. During the playoffs that year, he averaged 10.8 points, 2 rebounds, and 1.7 assists.

In the 2013–14 season, Crawford led the league's reserve players in scoring with 18.6 points per contest to go along with 3.2 assists and 2.3 rebounds. He came off the bench in 45 of 69 games he played in.

On May 8, 2014, Crawford won the 2014 NBA Sixth Man of the Year Award, his second time of winning the honor. Crawford also helped the Clippers finish with their best record in franchise history (57–25).

On December 8, 2014, during the last quarter of a game against the Phoenix Suns that the Clippers clinched 121–120 in overtime, Crawford was called for a loose ball foul after getting tangled with Suns' guard Eric Bledsoe at midcourt. Upon saying something to referee Mark Lindsay, Crawford received a technical, along with his first-ever ejection in his 976-game career.

During a win over the Phoenix Suns on November 2, 2015, Crawford eclipsed 16,000 points. On November 14, he scored a game-high 37 points in a 101–96 victory over the Detroit Pistons. On January 10, 2016, he recorded his 46th four-point play of his career in a 114–111 overtime win over the New Orleans Pelicans. On April 8, 2016, he made a three-pointer with 0.2 seconds left and finished with 30 points in the Clippers' 102–99 overtime victory over the Utah Jazz. On April 19, he was named NBA Sixth Man of the Year for the third time in his career. At 36 years old, he broke his own record, set in 2014, as the oldest winner of the award.

Crawford re-signed with the Clippers on July 8, 2016 on a three-year, $42 million contract. By making two of four three-pointers against the New Orleans Pelicans on December 2, 2016, Crawford (1,962) passed Vince Carter (1,961) for No. 6 on the NBA's all-time list for made three-pointers. With a three-pointer at the 2:06 mark of the second quarter in the Clippers' 118–109 loss to the Toronto Raptors on February 6, 2017, Crawford became the sixth NBA player to reach 2,000 made three-pointers. He joined Ray Allen, Reggie Miller, Jason Terry, Vince Carter and Paul Pierce in the 2000 club. During the game, he also passed Eddie Johnson for No. 2 in career NBA bench scoring. His tally of 9,572 bench points trails only Dell Curry's 11,147. He also surpassed Magic Johnson for 74th in career points scored. On February 11 against Charlotte, he scored 22 points while shooting 5-of-8 on three-pointers. Crawford (2,009) subsequently passed Vince Carter (2,006) for fifth-most three-pointers made in NBA history.

On July 6, 2017, the Clippers traded Crawford and a 2018 first-round pick to the Atlanta Hawks as part of a salary dump that cleared the way to acquire Danilo Gallinari from the Denver Nuggets by a sign-and-trade deal. The Hawks waived Crawford the following day.

=== Minnesota Timberwolves (2017–2018) ===
On July 19, 2017, Crawford signed a two-year, $8.9 million contract with the Minnesota Timberwolves. Debuting for the Timberwolves during their season-opener on October 18, 2017, Crawford scored 10 points in a 107–99 loss to the San Antonio Spurs. Two days later, he scored all 17 of his points in the fourth quarter and made a 3-pointer with 27.5 seconds left to help the Timberwolves hold off the Utah Jazz 100–97 in their home-opener. During a 108–107 victory over the Portland Trail Blazers on December 18, 2017, Crawford made a season-high 23 points in only 23 minutes, with 16 of them scored in the fourth quarter. On March 30, 2018, he had a 24-point effort in a 93–92 win over the Dallas Mavericks. In June 2018, Crawford won the Twyman-Stokes Teammate of the Year Award.

=== Phoenix Suns (2018–2019) ===
Crawford signed with the Phoenix Suns on October 17, 2018. During a 128–110 victory over the New York Knicks on December 17, Crawford dished out a career-high 14 assists. On January 6, 2019, in a 119–113 loss to the Charlotte Hornets, he finished with 16 points to join Dell Curry as the only NBA players to record 11,000+ career points as a reserve. Per 36 minutes in the 2018–19 season, Crawford averaged 15.1 points to go along with a career-high of 6.8 assists. In league history, only John Stockton has averaged more assists per 36 minutes in their 19th or later season.

On April 9, 2019, in a 120–109 season finale loss to the Dallas Mavericks, which would be Dirk Nowitzki's last home game, Crawford made NBA history by recording 51 points in his fourth 50-point game. With this performance he broke three NBA records: at 39 years old and 20 days, he became the oldest player to tally 50+ points - previously held by Michael Jordan at 38 years and 315 days since December 29, 2001. He scored the most points ever by a player not in the starting lineup - previously held by Nick Anderson with 50 points since April 23, 1993. And he became the only player in NBA history to record 50 points in a game with four different teams. During the game, Crawford shot 18-of-30 (60%) from the field, 7-of-13 (53.8%) from three-point range, and 8-of-9 (88.9%) from the free-throw line. He also had 5 rebounds, 5 assists, 1 steal, and 1 block coming off the bench. Down by as much as 31 in the third quarter, he rallied Phoenix back into the game, scoring 12 points in succession and bringing the score to 107–103 with 3:39 minutes left in the game. By scoring 28 and 27 points in the previous two games, Crawford joined Kobe Bryant as the only players in league history to record three consecutive 25+ point games in their 19th season or later.

The game was particularly noteworthy in that it ended up being the second-to-last game of Crawford's career.

=== Brooklyn Nets (2020) ===
On July 9, 2020, the Brooklyn Nets announced that they had signed Crawford as a substitute player for the remainder of the 2019–20 season. Four Nets players opted out of the NBA reboot in Orlando due to the COVID-19 pandemic, which led to Crawford's signing. He made his team debut on August 4, 2020, against the Milwaukee Bucks, becoming the oldest active player in the NBA at the time at 40 years and 137 days old, as well as the oldest Nets player to ever appear in a game. He also became the eighth player in NBA history to appear in a game in 20 different seasons, joining Vince Carter, Kevin Garnett, Dirk Nowitzki, Robert Parish, Kevin Willis, Kareem Abdul-Jabbar, Kobe Bryant, and LeBron James. He recorded five points and three assists in five minutes before leaving the game with a left hamstring injury. It was his only appearance for the Nets in their eight regular-season games and he did not play in their four playoff games.

His one appearance for the Nets was ultimately his final NBA game, as Crawford did not play for any team during the 2020–21 or 2021–22 seasons, as he officially announced his retirement from the league on March 21, 2022.

== Broadcasting career ==
Crawford started doing game broadcasts for NBA League Pass alongside Quentin Richardson in November 2021. He was a regular color analyst for The NBA on TNT starting in the 2022-23 season, also becoming a fixture on the Tuesday studio team before leaving both positions after the conclusion of The NBA on TNT's coverage of the 2023–24 season. Crawford signed with MSG Network's coverage of the New York Knicks starting with the 2024–25 NBA season to fill-in for about ten games as backup color analyst on television. Crawford joined the NBA on NBC as a lead game analyst beginning in the 2025–26 NBA season.

== Personal life ==
Crawford married his long-time girlfriend Tori Lucas on August 23, 2014. Among those to attend his wedding were Clippers teammates Blake Griffin, Matt Barnes, Chris Paul, DeAndre Jordan, and Spencer Hawes; also in attendance were NBA players Nate Robinson, a fellow Seattleite, and Isaiah Thomas, likewise from the Puget Sound area. Their son, JJ Crawford, is the top-ranked player in the nation in his high school class of 2029.

A prominent figure of the Seattle basketball community, Crawford has organized private workouts around the city, recruiting a revolving cast of high-level participants that include Zach LaVine and Kyrie Irving. He has also been involved in charitable activities in his hometown. Among other charitable community activities, Crawford provides opportunies for local players seeking to progress from amateur status to professional through "The Crawsover" league. This Pro–am summer-league at Seattle Pacific University is one of several prominent Pro-Am summer leagues in the United States, yet admission is free. Pros such as NBA All-Stars Chris Paul and Kevin Durant have participated in the past.

== Career statistics ==
Legend
GP	Games played	GS	Games started	MPG	Minutes per game
FG%	Field goal percentage	3P%	3-point field goal percentage	FT%	Free throw percentage
RPG	Rebounds per game	APG	Assists per game	SPG	Steals per game
BPG	Blocks per game	PPG	Points per game	**Bold**	Career high
*	Led the league

=== NBA ===
==== Regular season ====
Year	Team	GP	GS	MPG	FG%	3P%	FT%	RPG	APG	SPG	BPG	PPG
2000–01	Chicago	61	8	17.2	.352	.350	.794	1.5	2.3	.7	.2	4.6
2001–02	Chicago	23	6	20.9	.476	.448	.769	1.5	2.4	.8	.2	9.3
2002–03	Chicago	80	31	24.9	.413	.355	.806	2.3	4.2	1.0	.3	10.7
2003–04	Chicago	80	73	35.1	.386	.317	.833	**3.5**	**5.1**	**1.4**	**.4**	17.3
2004–05	New York	70	67	38.4	.398	.361	.843	2.9	4.3	1.3	.3	17.7
2005–06	New York	79	27	32.3	.416	.345	.826	3.1	3.8	1.1	.2	14.3
2006–07	New York	59	36	37.3	.400	.320	.838	3.2	4.4	1.0	.1	17.6
2007–08	New York	80	**80**	**39.9**	.410	.356	.864	2.6	5.0	1.0	.2	**20.6**
2008–09	New York	11	11	35.6	.432	.455	.761	1.5	4.4	.8	.0	19.6
2008–09	Golden State	54	54	38.6	.406	.338	.889	3.3	4.4	.9	.2	19.7
2009–10	Atlanta	79	0	31.1	.449	.382	.857	2.5	3.0	.8	.2	18.0
2010–11	Atlanta	76	0	31.1	.421	.341	.854	1.7	3.2	.8	.2	14.2
2011–12	Portland	60	6	26.9	.384	.308	**.927***	2.0	3.2	.9	.2	13.9
2012–13	L.A. Clippers	76	0	29.3	.438	.376	.871	1.7	2.5	1.0	.2	16.5
2013–14	L.A. Clippers	69	24	30.3	.416	.361	.866	2.3	3.2	.9	.2	18.6
2014–15	L.A. Clippers	64	4	26.6	.396	.327	.901	1.9	2.5	.9	.2	15.8
2015–16	L.A. Clippers	79	5	26.9	.404	.340	.904	1.8	2.3	.7	.2	14.2
2016–17	L.A. Clippers	**82***	1	26.3	.413	.360	.857	1.6	2.6	.7	.2	12.3
2017–18	Minnesota	80	0	20.7	.415	.331	.903	1.2	2.3	.5	.1	10.3
2018–19	Phoenix	64	0	18.9	.397	.332	.845	1.3	3.6	.5	.2	7.9
2019–20	Brooklyn	1	0	6.0	**.500**	**.500**	.000	0.0	3.0	.0	.0	5.0
Career		1,327	433	29.4	.410	.348	.862	2.2	3.4	.9	.2	14.6

==== Playoffs ====
Year	Team	GP	GS	MPG	FG%	3P%	FT%	RPG	APG	SPG	BPG	PPG
2010	Atlanta	11	0	31.9	.364	.360	.845	**2.7**	**2.7**	.8	.1	16.3
2011	Atlanta	12	0	29.8	.394	.350	.824	1.3	2.5	.8	**.3**	15.4
2013	L.A. Clippers	6	0	26.8	.387	.273	**1.000**	2.0	1.7	.5	.2	10.8
2014	L.A. Clippers	13	0	24.1	.398	.342	.886	1.5	2.0	.9	.2	15.5
2015	L.A. Clippers	**14**	0	27.1	.360	.243	.867	2.1	1.9	.9	.2	12.7
2016	L.A. Clippers	6	**1**	**33.2**	.379	.190	.880	2.2	2.2	**1.7**	.0	**17.3**
2017	L.A. Clippers	7	0	28.0	.422	.240	**1.000**	1.3	1.9	.6	.1	12.6
2018	Minnesota	5	0	24.6	**.447**	**.412**	.769	2.6	2.4	1.0	.0	11.8
Career		74	1	28.1	.386	.307	.865	1.9	2.2	.9	.2	14.3

=== College ===
Year	Team	GP	GS	MPG	FG%	3P%	FT%	RPG	APG	SPG	BPG	PPG
1999–00	Michigan	17	15	33.9	.412	.327	.784	2.8	4.5	1.1	0.9	16.6

== See also ==
- List of NBA career 3-point scoring leaders
- List of NBA career free throw percentage leaders
- List of NBA career games played leaders
- List of NBA career minutes played leaders
- List of NBA annual free throw percentage leaders
- List of oldest and youngest NBA players
- NBA regular season records
