= Kaleena Smith =

American basketball player (born 2008)

No. 11 – Ontario Christian Lady Knights
- Position: Point guard

Personal information
- Born: September 20, 2008 (age 18)
- Listed height: 5 ft 5 in (1.65 m)

Career information
- High school: Ontario Christian (Ontario, California)

Career highlights
- MaxPreps National Basketball Player of the Year (2026)
Medals
Representing the United States
Women's basketball
FIBA Under-18 AmeriCup
Gold medal – first place	2026 Mexico	Team

Kaleena Smith (born September 20, 2008) is an American basketball player who currently attends Ontario Christian School in Ontario, California, United States. She is a consensus five-star recruit and the top-ranked player in the 2027 class.

== Early life ==
Smith was born on September 20, 2008, to parents who both played college basketball. She began playing basketball when she was three years old after being gifted a ball by her grandfather, looking up to players like Kyrie Irving. At age eight, Smith began playing on a boys' club team based in Riverside, California, coached by her dad. In 2017, she was featured in a USA Today article which described her as a "basketball prodigy". Smith played against boys throughout her youth and received the nickname "Special K"; she was later sent a box of Special K cereal by Kellogg's in 2025. She was homeschooled through middle school while growing up in Perris, California, but started playing in the Nike Elite Youth Basketball League (EYBL) at age 12, initially at the 16U level, with the California Storm.

== High school career ==
=== Freshman season ===
Smith chose to attend Ontario Christian School in Ontario, California, located about 35 mi (56 km) away from her home in Perris, in part due to her wanting to "to grow [her] faith in God". On December 15, 2023, she broke the school single-game scoring record with 55 points — including a state-record 11 three-pointers — to go with 10 assists and 10 steals in three quarters of a 136–29 blowout win over Woodcrest Christian. On January 19, 2024, Smith broke her own school record by scoring 62 points, including 10 three-pointers, in a 132–21 rout of Linfield Christian. She eclipsed the 1,000 point mark in her 31st career game. As a freshman, Smith averaged 34.9 points, 6.5 assists, and 4.2 steals per game while shooting 50.3 percent from the field and 40.9 percent from three-point range, leading her team to a 28–5 record. She broke the state record with 179 three-pointers, surpassing the previous mark of 169 set by Danielle Viglione in 1992, and was named the MaxPreps National Freshman of the Year.

In addition to playing on the EYBL circuit with the Cal Storm that offseason, Smith played in Overtime Select, a new high school girls basketball league for top recruits. She served as one of only two freshman captains during the league's inaugural season in 2024, leading her team in points (20.8), assists (7.8), and steals (2.5), en route to a championship game appearance, where she scored 20 points for ISO WRLD in an 85–75 loss to Double Dynasty. Smith was also named the MVP of the UA Next Elite 24 showcase in Brooklyn after scoring 20 points, including the game-winning three-pointer, to help Team Fire beat a Saniyah Hall-led Team Ice.

=== Sophomore season ===
As a sophomore in 2024–25, Smith averaged 23.2 points, 8.1 assists, and 4.5 steals per game while leading the Lady Knights to a 30–2 record and their first-ever CIF Southern Section Open Division championship, hitting the game-winning free throws in a 65–63 win over Etiwanda. They also reached the CIF Southern Region Open Division final, where she scored a game-high 22 points in a 67–62 loss to Etiwanda. While her scoring average decreased in her second season, Smith showed a marked improvement as a facilitator. In addition to being named the MaxPreps National Sophomore of the Year, she became just the second sophomore to ever win the California Gatorade Player of the Year award, following Kaleena Mosqueda-Lewis in 2009. Smith also earned player of the year honors from the Los Angeles Times.

That offseason, Smith debuted on the Adidas 3SSB circuit with 7 Days. She helped them win the 17U championship, scoring 22 points in a 57–56 overtime win over the Nation Williams-led Utah Lady Prospects in the final, and earned circuit MVP honors after averaging 23 points and a tournament-high 5.9 assists per game. Smith was invited to the 2025 Adidas Eurocamp in Italy, but was unable to attend due to injury. She also returned for the second season of Overtime Select, once again pacing her team in points (26.8), assists (8.3), and steals (2.8). Smith guided ISO WRLD to the championship game for the second year in a row, where she scored 28 points in an 87–71 loss to the All Knighters, led by Saniyah Hall. In October, she was named the MVP of the Adidas 3SSBG All-American Camp after she averaged 33.3 points and 6.3 assists per game.

=== Junior season ===
As a junior in 2025–26, Smith averaged 31.5 points, 6.9 assists, 4.5 steals and 3.7 rebounds per game. She led Ontario Christian to a 34–2 record and the first CIF Open Division state title in school history; the Lady Knights were also awarded the mythical national championship by several outlets. Smith earned national player of the year honors from MaxPreps and the Sporting News. In addition, she repeated as both the California Gatorade Player of the Year and Los Angeles Times Player of the Year. She was noted for her improved leadership abilities.

In the season opener on November 21, 2025, Smith recorded 43 points and nine assists in a 100–49 win over Nazareth of Brooklyn. A few days later, she scored a season-high 51 points to go along with eight assists and seven rebounds in a 113–34 rout of Esperanza. On December 4, Smith tallied 32 points and a season-high 15 assists in an 88–41 win over Fairmont Prep. The following week, she logged back-to-back near-triple-doubles: 32 points, nine assists, and nine steals in a 98–25 win over Notre Dame, followed by 36 points, nine assists, and nine steals in a 77–47 win over King/Drew. On December 20, Smith scored 36 points in an 82–43 win over Missouri powerhouse Incarnate Word. On January 10, 2026, she scored 50 points in a 96–87 double-overtime win over Archbishop Mitty – their 20th straight victory. On January 17, she scored 45 points – over half her team's total – in a 78–70 win over St. John Vianney of New Jersey.

Smith logged a triple-double with 28 points, 12 assists, and 11 steals in a 114–50 win over Fairmont Prep in the CIF Southern Section Open Division quarterfinals. She helped Ontario Christian reach the sectional final, where she scored 30 points in a 69–62 loss to Sierra Canyon. The Lady Knights regrouped to win the CIF Southern Region title, with Smith scoring a team-high 20 points in a 73–51 win over Sage Hill in the regional final, to secure a berth in the state title game. She then led all scorers with 24 points to go with five assists in the team's 56–49 win over Archbishop Mitty in the CIF Open Division state championship game at Golden 1 Center in Sacramento.

=== Recruiting ===
Smith is a consensus five-star recruit and is widely considered the top high school prospect of the 2027 class. Her first NCAA Division I offer came at age 11 or 12 from California Baptist after she attended a camp at the school. Smith received additional offers from UConn, South Carolina, USC, and UCLA before entering high school, and had around 20 by the middle of her freshman season. In October 2024, she was named the top prospect in the 2027 class in the inaugural women's high school basketball rankings released by 247Sports. In July 2025, Smith was named the top player in the Rivals.com initial 2027 class rankings. Ahead of her junior season, ESPN affirmed her No. 1 class ranking, saying Smith "reads the floor better than any player in the country."

In December 2025, Smith announced her first three official visits to Louisville, California, and Syracuse, scheduled for early 2026, which she followed with an official visit to LSU.

== National team career ==
Smith earned a spot on the United States national under-17 team for the 2024 FIBA Under-17 Women's Basketball World Cup. However, she was not able to compete and was replaced by Kelsi Andrews.

== Player profile ==
Listed at 5 ft 6 in (1.68 m), Smith plays the point guard position. She is also an efficient shooter, approaching a 50–40–90 season as a high school junior (53.6 FG%, 38.2 3P%, and 89 FT%). Smith is also recognized for her poise, vision, and basketball IQ, with ESPN analyst Shane Laflin writing that she "controls every possession with her decision-making and ability to manipulate tempo, like a quarterback throwing for a touchdown under duress." She also uses her quickness to be effective on defense. Smith has stated that she studies Sue Bird game film.

In 2026, Kenneth Manoj of MassLive summarized her game ahead of the Hoophall Classic: "Standing at 5-foot-6, Smith knows how to use her size to her advantage ― and that might be her only disadvantage. With her superb shooting touch and tight handle, Smith creates scoring opportunities for herself with ease in the mid-range and from the perimeter and successfully juggles her responsibilities as a scorer and a creator."

== Personal life ==
Smith has volunteered with the Salvation Army, as a youth basketball coach, and a youth Bible study group supporter. She also interned with the Creative Artists Agency. Smith has known JuJu Watkins, whom she called her "big sis", since her youth.

In November 2024, Smith signed a name, image, and likeness (NIL) deal with Adidas, becoming the brand's first-ever high school women's basketball NIL partner. She was also Adidas' first signing under its new president of women's basketball, Candace Parker. In June 2026, Smith and Beckham Black became the first two high school basketball players to sign merchandising deals with ESPN, doing so through SportsCenter NEXT.

== Awards and honors ==
=== High school ===
- 2026 national champion (MaxPreps, Sporting News)
- 2026 CIF Open Division champion
- Sporting News National Player of the Year (2026)
- MaxPreps National Basketball Player of the Year (2026)
- MaxPreps National Sophomore of the Year (2025)
- MaxPreps National Freshman of the Year (2024)
- 2× MaxPreps All-America First Team (2025, 2026)
- MaxPreps All-America Third Team (2024)
- 2× Naismith All-America First Team (2025, 2026)
- 2× Sporting News All-America First Team (2025, 2026)
- 2× California Gatorade Player of the Year (2025, 2026)
- MaxPreps California Player of the Year (2026)
- Cal-Hi Sports Ms. Basketball (2026)
- Cal-Hi Sports Junior of the Year (2026)
- Cal-Hi Sports Sophomore of the Year (2025)
- Cal-Hi Sports Freshman of the Year (2024)
- Cal-Hi Sports All-State First Team (2024, 2025)
- 2× Los Angeles Times Player of the Year (2025, 2026)
- The Press-Enterprise Inland Empire Player of the Year (2026)
- 2× The Press-Enterprise All-Inland Empire First Team (2024, 2025)
