= Paul VI Catholic High School =

St. Paul VI Catholic High School

Location
- 42341 Braddock Road; Chantilly, Virginia 20152; United States; 38°54′20″N 77°32′18″W

Information
- Type: Private; college preparatory; day; Catholic school
- Motto: Grow in Grace & Wisdom
- Religious affiliation: Catholic
- Patron saints: St. Francis de Sales; St. Jane de Chantal; St. Paul VI
- Established: 1983; 43 years ago
- Oversight: Diocese of Arlington
- CEEB code: 470801
- Principal: Thomas Opfer
- Head of school: Laura H. Swenson
- Chaplain: Rev Fr. Jonathan Fioramonti
- Teaching staff: 105.9 (FTE) (2021–22)
- Grades: 9–12
- Gender: Co-ed
- Enrollment: 1,094 (2021–22)
- Student to teacher ratio: 10.3 (2021–22)
- Campus size: 68 acres (28 ha)
- Campus type: Large suburb
- Colors: Black and gold
- Slogan: Do Ordinary Things Extraordinarily Well
- Athletics conference: Washington Catholic Athletic Conference
- Team name: Panthers
- Rival: O'Connell Knights
- Accreditation: Southern Association of Colleges and Schools
- Publication: Panther Tracks
- Newspaper: The Panther Press
- Yearbook: Imprints
- Tuition: $23,290 (non-Catholic); $19,290 (Catholic)
- Affiliation: National Catholic Educational Association (NCEA)
- Website: paulvi.net

St. Paul VI Catholic High School (known as PVI or Paul VI) is a four-year private, catholic & college preparatory school in Chantilly, Virginia, United States. It was established in 1983.

== History ==
=== Early years ===
Paul VI opened for the 1983–84 school year, accepting freshmen and sophomore students only. The next year (1984–85), the school was open to freshmen through juniors, and 1985–86 saw the first senior class. The Diocese of Arlington purchased the school building, which was in a dilapidated condition, from George Mason University, which had owned it for about a decade. The structure had originally been Fairfax High School, which opened in 1935 and relocated to a new facility in January 1972. One wing of the building housed Alzheimer patients until the school's third year.

During its first years, the school was ministered by five Oblates of St. Francis de Sales, who also taught classes and one of whom (Rev. Donald Heet, OSFS) served as the principal. The remainder of the faculty were lay teachers. The other ordained faculty were Rev. Robert Mulligan, OSFS and Rev. John Lyle, OSFS. In 2000, the school selected its first principal who was not from the Oblate order. Mr. Philip Robey was selected for this position, and stepped down seven years later. He was replaced by Mrs. Virginia Colwell, a former English teacher at Paul VI.

=== 2001–2003 Expansion ===
On May 9, 2001, Bishop Paul Loverde of the Diocese of Arlington led a group of civic and school officials at the groundbreaking for a $6.5 million student activity center. It included a gathering space for the entire student body, three classrooms, a gymnasium, locker rooms, a weight room, a movable stage used for athletic and stage equipment, offices, laundry facilities, and a concession stand.

The expansion was the result of five years of planning and fundraising by the school to refurbish its grounds. After a generous grant from the Diocese of Arlington, school officials were able to make some needed repairs to the old building. Before actual construction began on the activity center in the winter of 2001, air conditioning was installed in the current building, and the original locker rooms were torn down.

The two-story addition was completed for the 2003–04 school year. This included the new gymnasium, locker rooms, computer lab, coaches' offices, and a wrestling room.

=== Renaming and Relocation ===
After the canonization of Pope Paul VI in October 2018, the school was renamed St. Paul VI Catholic High School to further honor its patron and namesake. In 2020, the high school relocated to the South Riding area in Loudoun County, amid the COVID-19 pandemic. The move had been planned prior to the pandemic.

== Academics ==
Courses are offered on five levels with the exception of theology, social science, electives and required computer courses. The average number of academic courses a student takes per semester is 7 (minimum is 6; maximum is 8). Honors, Advanced Placement, and Dual Enrollment courses have restricted enrollment based on qualifying scores on placement tests, subject area grades, cumulative GPA, and teacher recommendation.

Advanced Placement Courses (25) are effectively reserved for juniors and seniors; exceptional sophomores may be eligible. Students enrolled in any AP class are required to take the AP exam. • Calculus AB • Calculus BC • Chemistry • Chinese Language & Culture • Comparative Government & Politics • Computer Science A • Computer Science Principles • Drawing • English Language and Composition • English Literature and Composition • European History • French Language & Culture • Human Geography • Latin • Macroeconomics • Physics 1, 2, & C • Psychology • Research • Seminar • Spanish Language & Culture • Statistics • United States Government & Politics • United States History

Dual Enrollment Courses (27) are available to juniors and seniors capable of college level courses through Northern Virginia Community College (NVCC). Students must meet the entrance test requirements set by NVCC. The school considers dual enrollment courses to be equal in rigor to AP and weighs them accordingly. DE courses taught at Paul VI this year are: • Acting (CST 131, 132) • Beginning Chinese (CHI 101, 102) • Beginning German (GER 101, 102) • Biology with Lab (BIO 101, 102) • Chemistry (CHM 111, 112) • College Composition (ENG 111, 112) • Environmental Science (ENV 121, 122) • Fundamentals of Design 1 (ART 131) • Genetics (BIO 256) • Human Anatomy & Physiology (BIO 141, 142) • Intermediate Chinese (CHI 201, 202) • Intermediate German (GER 201, 202) • Intermediate Spanish (SPA 201, 202) • Microbiology (BIO 205) • US History II (HIS 122) • Theatre (CST 130) Honors Courses (31) are for students capable of advanced learning and independent work. • Computer Science • Engineering • English • Fine Arts • Mathematics • Science • Social Studies • World Language (Levels 2 – 5)

== Athletics ==
The athletic teams compete in the Washington Catholic Athletic Conference (WCAC) and the Virginia Independent State Athletic Association (VISAA). The school has a high-profile athletic rivalry with Bishop O'Connell High School in Arlington. The school mascot is the "Panthers" and was voted by the student body during the school's first year. The original school colors were brown and gold until the 1999–2000 school year. The school moved away from brown in favor of black, which was considered more stylish by the student body.

=== Basketball ===
The Paul VI basketball team won the Washington Catholic Athletic Conference boys' basketball championship in 2012. They did not lose a game in conference play, winning 21 consecutive conference games. No other team in the history of the WCAC has had an undefeated season while winning 21 games. The WCAC is widely regarded as the best high school basketball conference in the country.

Both the boys' and girls' basketball teams won the WCAC title in 2014. The boys' team also won the Virginia Independent Schools Athletic Association championship and the Alhambra championship for 2014. The boys' team won again in 2018, in 2022 and 2023 . The girls' team has won the Virginia Independent Schools Athletic Association championship every year since 2002.

=== Baseball ===
The baseball program at Paul VI had a record of 121–32 and seven championship titles between 2004 and 2008. The VISAA State Tournament includes the top eight private school baseball teams in the State of Virginia.

Former coach Billy Emerson had an overall record of 138–44 upon arriving in 2003. He was named coach of the year several times by the Washington Post, and Washington Examiner, as well as coach of the year in the WCAC and the VISAA. In 2008, he was also named Mid-Atlantic Coach of the Year by the National High School Baseball Coaches Association and was one of eight finalists for National High School Coach of the Year. Emerson stepped down to focus on being Paul VI Athletic Director. Emerson has since returned as coach.

=== Football ===
The football team won the WCAC Metro Conference Championship in 1999 and recently again in 2024.

=== Boys soccer ===
The soccer team won the state championship in 2010 and 2015.

=== Boys lacrosse ===
The PVI men's lacrosse program made its first appearances in the WCAC championship in 1993 and 1994. They made a first appearance in the State Championship and another trip to the WCAC Championship game in 2013. In 2014, professional lacrosse player Steven Brooks became offensive coordinator. The lacrosse program has made a final four every year since 2013. Since 2013, the men's lacrosse program has been ranked in the top 25 three different times and has stayed in the top 50. In 2018, the team won its first Virginia Independent Schools Athletic Association (VISAA) Division I boys' lacrosse State Championship. In 2026, the Panthers took home their first WCAC Trophy home with a record of 22-1, ranked #1 in the DMV.

=== Girls soccer ===
On November 5, 2016, the Lady Panthers took home the Washington Catholic Athletic Association (WCAC) girls soccer title for the first time since 1993, when the league was named the "Catholic Girls Athletic Association. They won it again in 2024.”

== Other sports ==
Athletics at the school include cross country, golf (co-ed), ice hockey (co-ed), swimming and diving, tennis (boys and girls), indoor track (winter), track and field, wrestling, volleyball (boys and girls), field hockey, cheerleading, dance team, softball, Special Olympics soccer, and basketball.

== Scandal ==
There was a high-profile scandal at PVI in 1999 when it was discovered that 16-year-old student Jonathan Taylor Spielberg, who claimed to be Steven Spielberg's nephew, was actually Anoushirvan Fakhran, a 27-year-old man from Tehran, Iran. After repeated truancy by Fakhran, school officials contacted DreamWorks to see if Spielberg had any information about his "nephew". When it was discovered that Spielberg only had nieces, a police investigation followed. Fakhran was arrested and later pleaded guilty to forgery. Fakhran was given an 11-month suspended sentence and placed on two years' probation.

== Notable alumni ==
- Raven Barber (2009) - basketball player, played professionally overseas
- Michelle DeLaune (1991) - nonprofit executive, CEO of NCMEC
- Marcus Derrickson (2015 - transferred) - basketball player, NBA
- Erick Green (2009) - basketball player, NBA
- DeShawn Harris-Smith (2023) - basketball player
- Kevin Kelly (2015) - baseball player, MLB
- Trevor Keels (2021) - basketball player, NBA
- V. J. King (2016) - basketball player, NBA G League and internationally
- DJ Mangas (2007) - football coach, Buffalo Bills
- Dug McDaniel (2022) - basketball player, Kansas State Wildcats
- Josh Oduro (2019) - basketball player, NBA G League
- Ashley Owusu (2019) - basketball player, 3rd round pick in the 2024 WNBA draft
- Josh Reaves (2015 - transferred) - basketball player, NBA
- Jeremy Roach (2020) - basketball player, Baylor Bears
- Danica Roem (2002) - politician, first openly transgender person to be elected and serve in a U.S. state legislature
- Owen Schmitt (2003 - transferred) - football player, NFL
- Brandon Slater (2018) - basketball player, NBA G League and internationally
- Jordan Smith Jr. (2026) – basketball player
