= Ballislife All-American Game =

High school all-star basketball game

The Ballislife All-American Game is an annual American all-star game featuring high school basketball players. It was founded in 2011 by Ballislife.com to provide a stage for West Coast players who were not selected to other All-American games. At the time, few players from the region were selected for the McDonald's All-American Game in Chicago or the Jordan Brand Classic in New York. Over time, the Ballislife game evolved to include top players throughout the nation. A girl's game was added in 2023.

A slam dunk contest is also held in conjunction with the game.

== Game results ==
Year	Result	Venue	City
2011	Navy 106, White 107	Titan Gymnasium	Fullerton, California
2012	Black 139, White 140	Darling Gymnasium	Fullerton, California
2013	Blue 135, White 116	Long Beach City College Hall of Champions	Long Beach, California
2014	Black 124, Red 127	Long Beach City College Hall of Champions	Long Beach, California
2015	Gray 107, Orange 114	Long Beach City College Hall of Champions	Long Beach, California
2016	Black 133, White 150	Long Beach City College Hall of Champions	Long Beach, California
2017	Blue 153, White 134	Long Beach City College Hall of Champions	Long Beach, California
2018	Black 143, White 146	Cerritos College	Norwalk, California
2019	Team Elite 123, Team Future 122	Long Beach Convention Center	Long Beach, California
2020	Cancelled due to COVID-19 pandemic	Cerritos College	Norwalk, California
2021	Cancelled due to COVID-19 pandemic		
2022	Cancelled due to COVID-19 pandemic		

== Game MVPs ==
Following are the most valuable players (MVP) from each year:

Year	Players	Ref
2011	Amir Garrett, Keaton Miles	
2012	Gabe York, Prince Ibeh	
2013	Elijah Brown, Jordan Bell	
2014	Shaqquan Aaron, Stanley Johnson	
2015	Thon Maker, Skal Labissière	
2016	Mustapha Heron, Lonzo Ball	
2017	Collin Sexton, Brandon McCoy	
2018	Moses Brown, Emmitt Williams	
2019	Isaiah Mobley, Jahmi'us Ramsey	

== Slam dunk champions ==
Zach LaVine won the dunk contest in 2013, and used the same moves as a professional to win the Slam Dunk Contest during the 2015 NBA All-Star Weekend.

Year	Players	Ref
2011	Amir Garrett	
2012	Anthony January	
2013	Zach LaVine	
2014	Iziahiah Sweeney	
2015	Derrick Jones	
2016	Terrance Ferguson	
2017	Jaylen Hands	
2018	Mac McClung	
2019	Terry Armstrong	

== Year-by-year rosters ==
=== 2011 ===
Navy Team

- Tyrell Corbin
- Amir Garrett
- Thomas Gipson
- Cezar Guerrero
- Jarion Henry
- Jalen Jones
- Byron Wesley
- Jordan Williams
- Collin Woods

White Team

- Devonta Abron
- Juan Anderson
- Jamal Branch
- Jabari Brown
- Jahii Carson
- Angelo Chol
- Jordan Green
- Nick Johnson
- Keaton Miles
- Ike Nwamu
- Wesley Saunders
- Greg Sequele

- Top scorer: Jalen Jones (Navy), 25
- Top rebounder: Amir Garrett (Navy), 9
- Most assists: Cezar Guerrero (Navy), 7

=== 2012 ===
Black Team

- Dominic Artis
- Ben Carter
- Charles Hill
- Anthony January
- Glenn Robinson III
- Matt Shrigley
- Skylar Spencer
- Nick Stover
- Gabe York

White Team

- Jordan Adams
- Rosco Allen
- Prince Ibeh
- Jordan Loveridge
- Langston Morris-Walker
- Katin Reinhardt
- Victor Robbins
- Tyrone Wallace
- Demetris Morant

- Top scorer: Jordan Loveridge (White), 26
- Top rebounder: Prince Ibeh (Black), 14
- Most assists: Dominic Artis (Black), 10

=== 2013 ===
Blue Team

- Malcolm Allen
- Marcus Allen
- Jordan Bell
- Deonte Burton
- Aquille Carr
- Derrick Griffin
- Isaac Hamilton
- Jaron Hopkins
- Tim Myles
- Christian Wood
- Kris Yanku

White Team

- Payton Banks
- Elijah Brown
- Stevie Clark
- Julian Jacobs
- Jack Karapetyan
- Zach LaVine
- Khleem Perkins
- Roschon Prince
- Brandon Randolph
- Dustin Thomas
- Paul Watson

- Top scorer: Jordan Bell (Blue), 22
- Top rebounder: Jordan Bell (Blue), 16
- Most assists: 4 players tied, 3

=== 2014 ===
Black Team

- Shaqquan Aaron
- Cliff Alexander
- Isaiah Bailey
- Keita Bates-Diop
- Gary Clark Jr
- Isaac Copeland
- Daniel Hamilton
- Ahmed Hill
- Alex Robinson
- Tyler Ulis

Red Team

- Leron Black
- Chris Chiozza
- Trevor Dunbar
- Stanley Johnson
- Terry Larrier
- Kevon Looney
- Jordan McLaughlin
- Namon Wright

- Top scorer: Stanley Johnson (Red), 39
- Top rebounder: Stanley Johnson (Red), 12
- Most assists: Tyler Ulis (Black), 10

=== 2015 ===
Gray Team

- Jalen Adams
- Malik Beasley
- Marquese Chriss
- Chance Comanche
- Thon Maker
- Chimezie Metu
- Donovan Mitchell
- Rex Pflueger
- Corey Sanders
- Justin Simon
- Kendall Small

Orange Team

- Paris Austin
- Dwayne Bacon
- Bennie Boatwright
- Isaiah Briscoe
- Tyler Dorsey
- Jeremy Hemsley
- Derrick Jones Jr.
- Skal Labissière
- Dejounte Murray
- Horace Spencer
- Stephen Thompson Jr.

- Top scorer: Isaiah Briscoe (Orange), 22
- Top rebounder: Skal Labissière (Orange), 15
- Most assists: Jalen Adams and Justin Simon (Gray), 5

=== 2016 ===
Black Team

- Rawle Alkins
- Lonzo Ball
- Troy Baxter Jr.
- Miles Bridges
- Yoeli Childs
- Sam Cunliffe
- Markus Howard
- Dewan Huell
- T. J. Leaf
- Kwe Parker

White Team

- Ike Anigbogu
- James Banks III
- Marques Bolden
- J. J. Caldwell
- Terrance Ferguson
- Mustapha Heron
- Vance Jackson
- Andrew Jones
- Mitch Lightfoot
- Cassius Winston

- Top scorer: Mustapha Heron (White), 33
- Top rebounder: T. J. Leaf (Black), 10
- Most assists: Andrew Jones (White), 14

=== 2017 ===
Blue Team

- Mohamed Bamba
- Quade Green
- Jalen Hill
- Ira Lee
- Charles O'Bannon Jr.
- KZ Okpala
- Collin Sexton
- Ethan Thompson
- Isaiah Washington
- P. J. Washington
- Kris Wilkes

White Team

- LiAngelo Ball
- Brian Bowen
- Trevon Duval
- Savion Flagg
- Jaylen Hands
- Chris Lykes
- Brandon McCoy
- Brandon Randolph
- Eli Scott
- Trae Young

- Top scorer: Brandon McCoy (White) and Ethan Thompson (Blue), 30
- Top rebounder: Brandon McCoy (White) and Isaiah Washington (Blue), 10
- Most assists: Eli Scott (White), 7

=== 2018 ===
Black Team

- James Akinjo
- Kaden Archie
- Jules Bernard
- Matt Bradley
- Teashon Cherry
- Talen Horton-Tucker
- Mac McClung
- Shareef O'Neal
- Javonte Smart
- Coby White
- Emmitt Williams

White Team

- Moses Brown
- Devon Dotson
- Nassir Little
- Jordan McCabe
- Luther Muhammad
- Miles Norris
- Naz Reid
- Kevin Porter Jr.
- David Singleton
- Duane Washington Jr.
- Brandon Williams

- Top scorer: Emmitt Williams (Black), 31
- Top rebounder: Emmitt Williams (Black), 12
- Most assists: Jordan McCabe (White), 6

=== 2019 ===
Team Elite

- Terry Armstrong
- Anthony Edwards
- Niven Glover
- Jaelen House
- Jaime Jaquez Jr.
- E. J. Liddell
- Tre Mann
- Mario McKinney
- Onyeka Okongwu
- Jahmi'us Ramsey
- Cassius Stanley
- Trendon Watford

Team Future

- Precious Achiuwa
- D. J. Carton
- Boogie Ellis
- Scottie Lewis
- Kenyon Martin Jr.
- Tyrese Maxey
- Isaiah Mobley
- Isaac Okoro
- Scotty Pippen Jr.
- Drew Timme
- Rocket Watts

- Top scorer: Isaiah Mobley (Team Future), 33
- Top rebounder: Jaime Jaquez Jr. (Team Elite), 8
- Most assists: Boogie Ellis and Isaiah Mobley (Team Future), 7
