= Jordan Brand Classic =

High school all-star basketball game

The event's logo

The Jordan Brand Classic is a high school all star basketball game played annually in April. The game's rosters feature the best and most highly recruited high school boys and girls in the senior class. In 2015, a girl's game was introduced.

The game takes its name from the chief organizer, Jordan Brand, a division of Nike named after Michael Jordan. The 22 players are routinely selected from the top 100 players as ranked by numerous scouting services.

Jordan Brand previously sponsored the Capital Classic in the Washington, D.C. area, from 2002 to 2004, when it was known as the Jordan Brand Capital Classic. After Michael Jordan was unable to move the game to New York, he started the Jordan Brand Classic.

== History ==
=== 2002 ===
The 2002 Jordan Capital Classic was played at Washington, D.C.'s MCI Center with many players who went on to play in the NBA. The White Jerseys, led by coach Steve Smith of Oak Hill Academy, had Co-MVP's Sean May (Sacramento Kings) and Amar'e Stoudemire (Phoenix Suns) contribute 49 points and 27 rebounds to their victory. In fact, nine of the 12 White Team players scored in double-figures, including Rashad McCants (Minnesota Timberwolves) who went 10-13 from the field for 23 points. For the Red Team, fans saw former Oak Hill teammates Carmelo Anthony (New York Knicks) and Justin Gray (Wake Forest) score 27 and 17 points respectively. Over the next four years, this class would include representation on three National Champions (Anthony, McCants, May and Denham Brown) and numerous NBA lottery picks.

=== 2003 ===
The 2003 Jordan Brand Capital Classic was played in front of a sold-out crowd of 18,424 fans at the MCI Center in Washington, DC. The game gave a glimpse at many future NBA players from the start, but the second half belonged to Co-MVP Shannon Brown (Los Angeles Lakers) as he led the Silver Jerseys with 27 points and eight assists. His teammate Chris Paul (Los Angeles Clippers) added 18 points and five assists to go along with a solid defensive effort. Co-MVP LeBron James (Cleveland Cavaliers) finished the game with 34 points and 12 rebounds for the Black Jerseys. Linas Kleiza (Europe) scored 16 points and had 10 rebounds and Kris Humphries (Boston Celtics) contributed 12 points and 12 rebounds to pace the Black Jerseys. The Silver Jerseys outscored their opponents by nine in the second half to prevail 107–102. The event also included musical performances by Bow Wow and Ludacris.

=== 2004 ===
This was the last year that Jordan Brand was the title sponsor of the Capital Classic. The Black Jerseys won with the contribution of the year's No. 1 NBA Draft pick as they defeated the White Jerseys by a score of 107–96 at the Comcast Center on the campus of the University of Maryland. The Black Jerseys, which took the lead at the beginning of the game and never looked back, were led by Dwight Howard (Los Angeles Lakers) of Southwest Atlanta Christian Academy. He was voted the game's MVP with 18 points, 15 rebounds and six blocks. Dorell Wright (Miami Heat) had 24 points and seven rebounds for the White Jerseys in a losing cause. Complementing Howard's dominating performance were Malik Hairston (San Antonio Spurs) who chipped in 23 points and Robert Vaden (Indiana) who added 21 points to lead the Black Jerseys to the win. Al Jefferson (Charlotte Hornets) had 17 points and 10 rebounds and Rajon Rondo (Chicago Bulls) scored 12 points and recorded five assists in the losing effort for the White Jerseys. The Class of 2004 included a number of others who starred during the 2006 NCAA season including National Champion Corey Brewer (Florida), Jordan Farmar (UCLA), Daniel Gibson (Texas), LaMarcus Aldridge (Texas), and Rudy Gay (Connecticut).

=== 2005 ===
A new home was chosen for the Jordan All-American Classic as the event took center stage at Madison Square Garden in New York City before a crowd that included the likes of Michael Jordan, Spike Lee, Terrell Owens, Vince Carter and a special performance by Fat Joe. In the last year before the NBA restricted players from leaving directly for the NBA, a quarter of the 2005 Jordan All-Americans went from this game directly to the professional ranks. One of those NBA draft picks, Andray Blatche (Washington Wizards), finished off his high school career with a Co-MVP performance of 26 points on 12–17 shooting with 16 rebounds to lead the White Jerseys. Sharing the award was Tyler Hansbrough (North Carolina) who helped his Gray Jerseys to a last-minute 127–126 win with 24 points and nine rebounds. Joining Blatche making the leap to the NBA included C.J. Miles (Utah Jazz), Louis Williams (Philadelphia 76ers), Andrew Bynum (Los Angeles Lakers), and Martell Webster (Portland Trail Blazers).

=== 2006 ===
For the second consecutive year the Jordan Classic was played in New York City at the Madison Square Garden. 10,000 plus people were in attendance. Georgia Tech-bound Thaddeus Young earned co-Most Valuable Player honors as he finished with 28 points and 13 rebounds to lead the White Jerseys to the 108–95 victory over the Black Jerseys. Young was joined by co-MVP Kevin Durant (Texas) who had 16 points, seven rebounds and three blocks. The event was attended by Michael Jordan, LL Cool J, Warren Sapp, Floyd Mayweather, Ahmad Rashad, Al Harrington, Rudy Gay, Fabolous, and Vince Carter. Atlanta-based rapper T.I., who starred in the movie ‘ATL’ and had the No.1 album ‘King’, performed prior to the All-American game. Young helped the White Jerseys take a seven-point first-half lead in a game that was close from the start. His 28 points was the second-highest all-time scoring total behind 34 points from LeBron James in 2003 and Young's 13 rebounds were the fourth-highest mark in game history as well. Another standout performer for the White Jerseys was Sherron Collins (Kansas) with 14 points and six assists. For the Black Jerseys, Durant was joined by the Syracuse recruit tandem of Paul Harris and Mike Jones who each chipped in 16 points. Brandan Wright (North Carolina), Wayne Ellington (North Carolina), Edgar Sosa (Louisville), and DeShawn Sims (Michigan) also each finished in double-figures.

=== 2007 ===
Corey Fisher (Villanova) tallied 10 assists to set a new record for the Jordan Brand All-American Classic, presented by Foot Locker and Boost Mobile, as he led his Yellow Jerseys to the 127–119 victory at Madison Square Garden. The Yellow Jerseys also got contributions from Eric Gordon (Indiana), Kyle Singler (Duke), and Austin Freeman (Georgetown) who each had 16 points a piece. Jeff Robinson (Memphis) led the Yellow Jerseys with 17 points. Donté Greene (Syracuse), who also won the dunk contest earlier in the week, led the Royal Jerseys with 20 points to share the MVP award with Fisher. The Royal Jerseys had solid performances from Patrick Patterson (Kentucky) who recorded 12 points and 12 rebounds along with Jerryd Bayless who poured in 17 points and dished out three assists. This year's event was the first high school all-star game to be televised in High Definition, with a live national broadcast on ESPN2.

=== 2008 ===
Brandon Jennings (Italy) earned co-Most Valuable Player honors tonight as he finished with 10 points and 14 assists to lead the Blue Jerseys to the 124–114 victory over the White Jerseys in the 2008 Jordan Brand Classic. Jennings was joined by co-MVP Tyreke Evans (Memphis) who had 23 points, seven rebounds and four assists. Jennings’ 14 assists broke the event record previously held by Corey Fisher while his teammates Scotty Hopson (Tennessee) and DeMar DeRozan (USC) contributed 21 and 17 points respectively. The White Jerseys saw solid contributions from Devin Ebanks (West Virginia), who had 20 points and four rebounds and Samardo Samuels (Louisville) who tallied 16 points and five boards. The game saw the attendance of various celebrities, among which Vince Carter, Rudy Gay, Kevin Durant, Ron Harper, Mýa and Michael Jordan. Boyz II Men opened the event singing the national anthem.

=== 2009 ===
Georgia Tech-bound Derrick Favors earned co-Most Valuable Player honors as he finished with 21 points and five rebounds to lead the Black Jerseys to the 110–103 victory over the White Jerseys. Favors was joined by co-MVP Renardo Sidney (Mississippi State) who had 15 points, seven rebounds and two blocks. Other statistical standouts included Wally Judge (Kansas State) with 18 points, John Wall (Kentucky) with six assists, Daniel Orton (Kentucky) with nine rebounds and John Henson (North Carolina) with four blocks. Michael Jordan, CC Sabathia, Spike Lee, Fat Joe, Vince Carter, and Kevin Durant attended the game, among others. Grammy nominee recording artist Akon, performed during halftime of the All-American game.

=== 2010 ===
North Carolina-bound Harrison Barnes earned co-Most Valuable Player honors as he finished with 20 points and 15 rebounds to lead the White Jerseys to the 129–125 victory over the Black Jerseys at the 2010 Jordan Brand Classic at Madison Square Garden in New York City. Harrison Barnes was joined by co-MVP Kyrie Irving (Duke) who had 22 points, seven assists and four rebounds for the Black Jerseys. Other statistical standouts included Josh Selby (Kansas) with 21 points, Cory Joseph (Texas) with seven assists, Tristan Thompson (Texas) with 13 rebounds and Jared Sullinger (Ohio State) with four blocks. A highlight of the evening was college announcements in front of the Madison Square Garden crowd and national ESPN television audience from Josh Selby, who committed to Kansas and New York City native Doron Lamb, who announced that he will be attending Kentucky in the fall. The Jordan Brand Classic saw the participation of various musicians and sports personalities including Chris Paul, Jadakiss, DJ Clue, Mario, MC Lyte, Lee England, DJ Clark Kent, Skyzoo and Alex Thomas. Multi-platinum recording artist and actor Common headlined the halftime musical performance while R&B artist and songwriter Marsha Ambrosius performed the National Anthem.

=== 2011 ===
Kentucky-bound Anthony Davis earned co-Most Valuable Player honors tonight, as he finished with 29 points and 11 rebounds and 4 blocks for the West All-Americans who lost to the East All-Americans 113–109 at the 10th anniversary Jordan Brand Classic presented by Foot Locker. Davis was joined by co-MVP James Michael McAdoo (UNC) who had 26 points, 14 rebounds for the East All-Americans. Other statistical standouts in the game included Austin Rivers (Duke) with 16 points, Tony Wroten (Washington) with 10 assists, Bradley Beal (Florida) with 8 rebounds and Khem Birch (Pittsburgh) with 5 blocks. Sponsored by Jordan Brand, a division of NIKE, Inc., the event was attended by celebrities, including North Carolina native J. Cole headlining the post-game performance. In addition, beat maker AraabMuzik was featured at halftime and singer Anthony Hamilton performed the National Anthem.

=== 2012 ===
Shabazz Muhammad (UCLA) earned co-Most Valuable Player honors tonight as he showcased his talents on the National stage, leading the West All-Americans with 20 points and four rebounds. Muhammad was joined by co-MVP Rodney Purvis (UCONN) who shined in his home state of North Carolina leading the East All-Americans with 22 points and three steals. Other statistical standouts included Alex Poythress (Kentucky) with 16 points, Archie Goodwin (Kentucky) with 14 points and four assists, Kaleb Tarczewski (Arizona) with 14 points and 10 rebounds and Tony Parker (UCLA) with 12 rebounds. Sponsored by Jordan Brand, a division of NIKE, Inc., the event was once again attended by some of sport and entertainment's celebrities, including a post game performance by rapper Fabolous. The North Carolina A&T University marching band was featured at halftime and violinist Lee England Jr. performed the National Anthem.

=== 2013 ===
Julius Randle (Dallas, TX/Kentucky) earned co-Most Valuable Player honors as he finished with 19 points and seven rebounds at the 12th annual Jordan Brand Classic. Sharing the co-MVP honors was Jabari Parker (Chicago, IL/Duke), who had 16 points and seven rebounds. The Jordan Brand Classic not only features future stars on the court, but many prominent celebrities such as Michael Jordan, Mark Wahlberg, CC Sabathia, Carmelo Anthony, Amar'e Stoudemire, Fabolous and J. R. Smith were in attendance. In addition to the post-game performance by Drake, the X-Factor Drumline wowed fans during the International Game halftime and Saxophonist Mike Phillips and violinist Lee England, Jr. performed together during the National Game halftime show. Other standouts in the game included Nigel Williams-Goss (Henderson, NV/Washington), who had 17 points for the West team and Andrew Wiggins (Huntington, VA/Kansas) who had 19 points for the East. The event concluded a week of activities around Brooklyn and New York City, including a special movie screening with director Spike Lee at the Brooklyn Academy of Music, an awards dinner at ThreeSixity and a tour of the Gleason's Boxing Gym with Team Jordan athlete Andre Ward.

== Game results ==
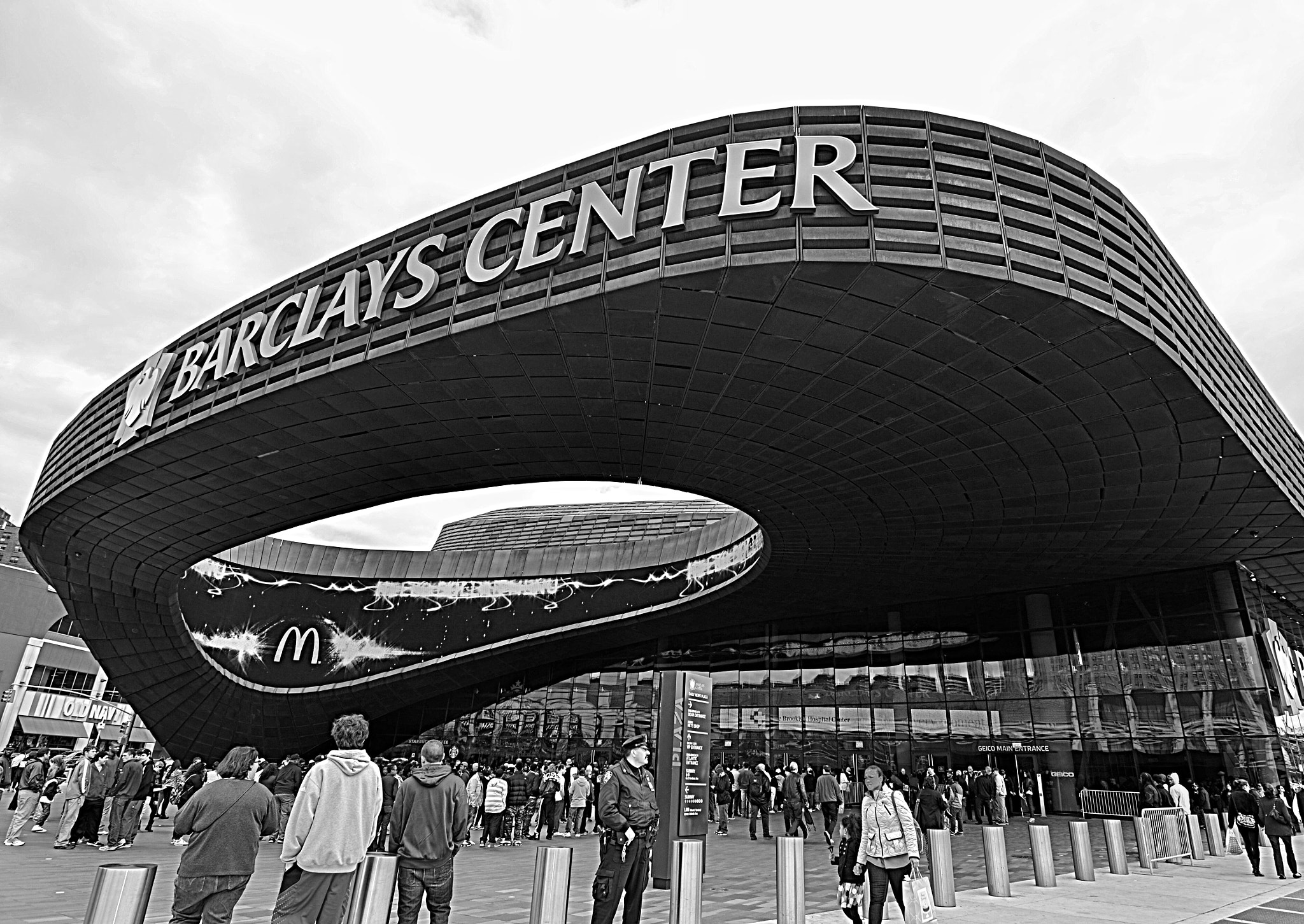
The Jordan Brand Classic was held at the Barclays Center in Brooklyn, New York from 2013 to 2018

Boys
Year	Result	Venue	City	Attendance
2002	Red 121, White 167	MCI Center	Washington, D.C.	7,472
2003	Black 102, Silver 107	MCI Center	Washington, D.C.	18,424
2004	Away 107, Home 96	Comcast Center	College Park, MD	9,275
2005	Gray 127, White 126	Madison Square Garden	New York, NY	N/A
2006	Black 95, White 108	Madison Square Garden	New York, NY	N/A
2007	Royal 119, Yellow 127	Madison Square Garden	New York, NY	N/A
2008	Blue 124, White 114	Madison Square Garden	New York, NY	N/A
2009	Black 110, White 103	Madison Square Garden	New York, NY	N/A
2010	East 125, West 129	Madison Square Garden	New York, NY	15,075
2011	East 113, West 109	Time Warner Cable Arena	Charlotte, NC	N/A
2012	East 95, West 99	Time Warner Cable Arena	Charlotte, NC	N/A
2013	East 98, West 102	Barclays Center	Brooklyn, NY	N/A
2014	East 158, West 147	Barclays Center	Brooklyn, NY	N/A
2015	East 116, West 118	Barclays Center	Brooklyn, NY	N/A
2016	East 131, West 117	Barclays Center	Brooklyn, NY	N/A
2017	East 116, West 124	Barclays Center	Brooklyn, NY	N/A
2018	Black 136, White 146	Barclays Center	Brooklyn, NY	N/A
2019	Black 125, White 132	T-Mobile Arena	Las Vegas, NV	N/A
2022	Air 118, Flight 109	Hope Academy	Chicago, IL	N/A
2024	Air 113, Flight 119	Barclays Center	Brooklyn, NY	
2025	Air 141, Flight 124	CareFirst Arena	Washington, D.C.	
2026	Air 135, Flight 133	El Camino College	Torrance, CA	

Girls
Year	Result	Venue	City
2015	East 76, West 75	Barclays Center	Brooklyn, NY
2016	East 94, West 100	Barclays Center	Brooklyn, NY
2017	East 81, West 122	Barclays Center	Brooklyn, NY
2018	Away 88, Home 89	Barclays Center	Brooklyn, NY
2019	Away 87, Home 82	T-Mobile Arena	Las Vegas, NV
2022	Air 93, Flight 85	Hope Academy	Chicago, IL
2024	Air 103, Flight 111	Barclays Center	Brooklyn, NY
2025	Air 108, Flight 128	CareFirst Arena	Washington, D.C.
2026	Air 91, Flight 108	El Camino College	Torrance, CA

== MVP Awards ==
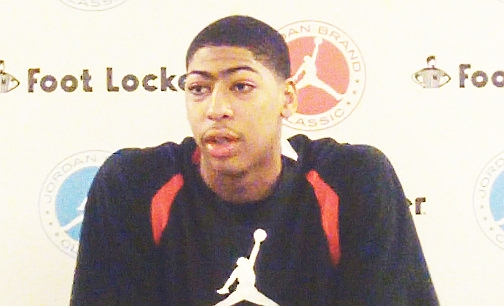
2011 co-MVP Anthony Davis

Boys
Year	Player	High School	Post-high school
2002	Amar'e Stoudemire	Cypress Creek HS (FL)	NBA
2002	Sean May	Bloomington HS North (IN)	North Carolina
2003	LeBron James	St. Vincent–St. Mary HS (OH)	NBA
2003	Shannon Brown	Proviso East HS (IL)	Michigan State
2004	Dwight Howard	Southwest Atlanta Christian Academy (GA)	NBA
2005	Tyler Hansbrough	Poplar Bluff HS (MO)	North Carolina
2005	Andray Blatche	South Kent School (CT)	NBA
2006	Kevin Durant	Montrose Christian School (MD)	Texas
2006	Thaddeus Young	Mitchell HS (TN)	Georgia Tech
2007	Donté Greene	Towson Catholic HS (MD)	Syracuse
2007	Corey Fisher	St. Patrick HS (NJ)	Villanova
2008	Brandon Jennings	Oak Hill Academy (VA)	NBA
2008	Tyreke Evans	American Christian Academy (PA)	Memphis
2009	Derrick Favors	South Atlanta HS (GA)	Georgia Tech
2009	Renardo Sidney	Fairfax HS (CA)	Mississippi State
2010	Harrison Barnes	Ames HS (IA)	North Carolina
2010	Kyrie Irving	St. Patrick HS (NJ)	Duke
2011	James McAdoo	Norfolk Christian Schools (VA)	North Carolina
2011	Anthony Davis	Perspectives Charter Schools (IL)	Kentucky
2012	Shabazz Muhammad	Bishop Gorman HS (NV)	UCLA
2012	Rodney Purvis	Upper Room Christian Academy (NC)	NC State
2013	Julius Randle	Prestonwood Christian Academy (TX)	Kentucky
2013	Jabari Parker	Simeon Career Academy (IL)	Duke
2014	Jahlil Okafor	Whitney Young HS (IL)	Duke
2014	Cliff Alexander	Curie Metropolitan HS (IL)	Kansas
2015	Allonzo Trier	Findlay Prep (WA)	Arizona
2015	Cheick Diallo	Our Savior New American School (NY)	Kansas
2016	De'Aaron Fox	Cypress Lakes High School (TX)	Kentucky
2016	Malik Monk	Bentonville High School (AR)	Kentucky
2017	Brian Bowen	La Lumiere School (IN)	Louisville
2017	Lonnie Walker	Reading HS (PA)	Miami
2018	Emmitt Williams	Oak Ridge High School (FL)	LSU
2018	Nassir Little	Orlando Christian Prep (FL)	North Carolina
2019	Cole Anthony	Oak Hill Academy (VA)	North Carolina
2019	James Wiseman	East (TN)	Memphis
2022	Nick Smith Jr.	North Little Rock (AR)	Arkansas
2022	Dillon Mitchell	Montverde Academy (FL)	Texas
2024	Dylan Harper	Don Bosco Prep (NJ)	Rutgers
2024	Liam McNeeley	Montverde Academy (FL)	Connecticut
2025	Kiyan Anthony	Long Island Lutheran HS (NY)	Syracuse
2026	Tyran Stokes	Rainier Beach HS (WA)	Kansas

Girls
Year	Player	High School	Post-high school
2015	Napheesa Collier	Incarnate Word Academy (MO)	UConn
2015	Taja Cole	L. C. Bird HS (VA)	Louisville
2016	Joyner Holmes	Cedar Hill HS (TX)	Texas
2016	Erin Boley	Elizabethtown HS (KY)	Notre Dame
2017	Kiana Williams	Karen Wagner HS (TX)	Stanford
2017	Chasity Patterson	North Shore HS (TX)	Texas
2018	Emily Engstler	St. Francis Prep (NY)	Syracuse
2018	Shakira Austin	Riverdale Baptist School (MD)	Maryland
2019	Zia Cooke	Rogers HS (OH)	South Carolina
2019	Haley Jones	Archbishop Mitty HS (CA)	Stanford
2022	Timea Gardiner	Fremont HS (UT)	Oregon State
2022	Flau'jae Johnson	Sprayberry HS (GA)	LSU
2024	Joyce Edwards	Camden HS (SC)	South Carolina
2024	Kennedy Smith	Etiwanda HS (CA)	USC
2025	Aaliyah Chavez	Monterey HS (TX)	Oklahoma
2026	Amalia Holguin	Sage Hill School (CA)	Texas

== Year-by-year rosters ==
=== 2002 ===
RED

- Hassan Adams
- Carmelo Anthony
- Kelenna Azubuike
- Dee Brown
- Greg Brunner
- Justin Gray
- Alexander Johnson
- Jimmy McKinney
- Shavlik Randolph
- JJ Redick
- Chris Rodgers
- Aaron Spears
- Bracey Wright

WHITE

- Denham Brown
- Evan Burns
- Travis Garrison
- John Gilchrist
- Jeff Horner
- Andre Iguodala
- Jarrett Jack
- Sean May
- Rashad McCants
- Amar'e Stoudemire
- Michael Thompson
- Kennedy Winston

=== 2003 ===
BLACK

- Shagari Alleyne
- Gary Ervin
- Brandon Foust
- Kris Humphries
- LeBron James
- Linas Kleiza
- Drew Lavender
- Rodrick Stewart
- Von Wafer

SILVER

- Shannon Brown
- Jermareo Davidson
- Ndudi Ebi
- J. R. Giddens
- Dion Harris
- Ekene Ibekwe
- Taurean "Tack" Minor
- Chris Paul
- Courtney Sims

=== 2004 ===
BLACK

- Ra'Sean Dickey
- Jordan Farmar
- Daniel Gibson
- Malik Hairston
- Dwight Howard
- Brian Johnson
- Russell Robinson
- Isaiah Swann
- Robert Vaden
- D. J. White

WHITE

- LaMarcus Aldridge
- Corey Brewer
- Joe Crawford
- Rudy Gay
- Al Jefferson
- Sasha Kaun
- A. J. Price
- Jason Rich
- Rajon Rondo
- Dorell Wright

=== 2005 ===
GRAY

- Andrew Bynum
- Devan Downey
- Levance Fields
- Tyler Hansbrough
- C. J. Miles
- Kevin Rogers
- Magnum Rolle
- Lou Williams
- Shawne Williams
- Julian Wright

WHITE

- Andray Blatche
- Eric Boateng
- Jon Brockman
- Keith Brumbaugh
- Lewis Clinch
- Micah Downs
- Richard Hendrix
- Emanuel "Tiki" Mayben
- Mike Mercer
- Martell Webster

=== 2006 ===
BLACK

- Demond Carter
- Kevin Durant
- Paul Harris
- Mike Jones
- Ty Lawson
- Vernon Macklin
- Obi Muonelo
- Greg Oden
- DaJuan Summers
- Brandan Wright
- Brian Zoubek

WHITE

- Sherron Collins
- Duke Crews
- Wayne Ellington
- Spencer Hawes
- Curtis Kelly
- Jon Kreft
- Jon Scheyer
- DeShawn Sims
- Edgar Sosa
- Thaddeus Young

=== 2007 ===
ROYAL

- Jerryd Bayless
- Donté Greene
- Jeffrey Jordan
- Kosta Koufos
- Kalin Lucas
- O. J. Mayo
- Patrick Patterson
- Chandler Parsons
- Durrell Summers
- Chris Wright (b. 1989)

YELLOW

- Corey Fisher
- Austin Freeman
- Eric Gordon
- Blake Griffin
- Gary Johnson
- Jai Lucas
- Jeff Robinson
- Derrick Rose
- Kyle Singler
- Chris Wright (b. 1988)

=== 2008 ===
AWAY

- William Buford
- DeMar DeRozan
- Drew Gordon
- JaMychal Green
- Jrue Holiday
- Scotty Hopson
- Brandon Jennings
- Malcolm Lee
- Greg Monroe
- B. J. Mullens
- Wesley Witherspoon

HOME

- Al-Farouq Aminu
- Ed Davis
- Michael Dunigan
- Devin Ebanks
- Tyreke Evans
- Delvon Roe
- Samardo Samuels
- Iman Shumpert
- Kemba Walker
- Willie Warren
- Tony Woods

=== 2009 ===
BLACK

- Kenny Boynton
- Avery Bradley
- Dominic Cheek
- DeMarcus Cousins
- Derrick Favors
- Abdul Gaddy
- Jordan Hamilton
- John Henson
- Lamont Jones
- Alex Oriakhi
- Durand Scott

WHITE

- Tiny Gallon
- Xavier Henry
- Marcus Jordan
- Wally Judge
- Tommy Mason-Griffin
- Daniel Orton
- Renardo Sidney
- John Wall
- Royce White
- Jamil Wilson
- Mouphtaou Yarou

=== 2010 ===
BLUE

- Harrison Barnes
- Will Barton
- Tobias Harris
- Terrence Jones
- Cory Joseph
- Doron Lamb
- Kendall Marshall
- Josh Selby
- Joshua Smith
- Tristan Thompson

RED

- Reggie Bullock
- Kyrie Irving
- Perry Jones
- Jelan Kendrick
- Brandon Knight
- C. J. Leslie
- Roscoe Smith
- Jared Sullinger
- Deshaun Thomas
- Dion Waiters

=== 2011 ===
BLACK

- Bradley Beal
- Jabari Brown
- Kentavious Caldwell-Pope
- Anthony Davis
- Myck Kabongo
- Johnny O'Bryant
- Sir'Dominic Pointer
- Otto Porter
- Adonis Thomas
- Kyle Wiltjer
- Tony Wroten

WHITE

- Khem Birch
- Michael Carter-Williams
- Rakeem Christmas
- Michael Gbinije
- Michael Gilchrist
- P. J. Hairston
- James Michael McAdoo
- Austin Rivers
- Shannon Scott
- Marquis Teague

=== 2012 ===
EAST

- Kyle Anderson
- Kris Dunn
- Jerami Grant
- Gary Harris
- Brice Johnson
- Ricky Ledo
- Nerlens Noel
- Tony Parker
- Rodney Purvis
- Kaleb Tarczewski
- JP Tokoto

WEST

- Steven Adams
- Brandon Ashley
- Isaiah Austin
- Anthony Bennett
- Archie Goodwin
- Danuel House
- Grant Jerrett
- Shabazz Muhammad
- Marcus Paige
- Alex Poythress
- Rasheed Sulaimon

=== 2013 ===
EAST

- Tyler Ennis
- Aaron Harrison
- Andrew Harrison
- Kuran Iverson
- Rondae Jefferson
- Kennedy Meeks
- Bobby Portis
- Julius Randle
- Wayne Selden
- Chris Walker
- Andrew Wiggins

WEST

- Joel Embiid
- Aaron Gordon
- Kasey Hill
- Dakari Johnson
- Matt Jones
- Marcus Lee
- Jabari Parker
- Noah Vonleh
- Troy Williams
- Nigel Williams-Goss
- James Young

=== 2014 ===
EAST

- Grayson Allen
- Joel Berry II
- James Blackmon Jr.
- Justin Jackson
- Tyus Jones
- Trey Lyles
- Jahlil Okafor
- Kelly Oubre
- L. J. Peak
- Karl-Anthony Towns
- Reid Travis
- Rashad Vaughn
- Isaiah Whitehead

WEST

- Shaqquan Aaron
- Cliff Alexander
- Devin Booker
- Kameron Chatman
- Daniel Hamilton
- Stanley Johnson
- Chris McCullough
- Emmanuel Mudiay
- Theo Pinson
- D'Angelo Russell
- Myles Turner
- Tyler Ulis
- Justise Winslow

=== 2015 ===
EAST

- Isaiah Briscoe
- Jaylen Brown
- Jalen Brunson
- Thomas Bryant
- Jalen Coleman-Lands
- Eric Davis
- Cheick Diallo
- Henry Ellenson
- Luke Kennard
- Skal Labissière
- Charles Matthews
- Malachi Richardson
- Caleb Swanigan

WEST

- Dwayne Bacon
- Malik Beasley
- Antonio Blakeney
- Deyonta Davis
- Tyler Davis
- Tyler Dorsey
- Austin Grandstaff
- Dedric Lawson
- Malik Newman
- Ivan Rabb
- Ben Simmons
- Allonzo Trier
- Stephen Zimmerman

=== 2016 ===
EAST

- Bam Adebayo
- Udoka Azubuike
- Tony Bradley
- Bruce Brown
- De'Aaron Fox
- Markelle Fultz
- Harry Giles
- Alterique Gilbert
- Jonathan Isaac
- V. J. King
- Jayson Tatum

WEST

- Miles Bridges
- Marques Bolden
- Amir Coffey
- Wenyen Gabriel
- Frank Jackson
- Andrew Jones
- Malik Monk
- Shamorie Ponds
- Omari Spellman
- Cassius Winston

=== 2017 ===
EAST

- Brian Bowen
- Wendell Carter Jr.
- Trevon Duval
- Jalek Felton
- Quade Green
- Jaren Jackson Jr.
- Brandon McCoy
- John Petty Jr.
- Michael Porter Jr.
- Mitchell Robinson
- Jarred Vanderbilt
- Tremont Waters

WEST

- Deandre Ayton
- Mo Bamba
- Troy Brown Jr.
- Matt Coleman III
- Kevin Knox II
- Billy Preston
- Collin Sexton
- Nick Richards
- Gary Trent Jr.
- P. J. Washington
- Lonnie Walker
- Trae Young

=== 2018 ===
EAST

- RJ Barrett
- Jalen Carey
- Ayo Dosunmu
- Quentin Grimes
- Tre Jones
- Romeo Langford
- Andrew Nembhard
- Cam Reddish
- Anfernee Simons
- Jalen Smith
- Cole Swider
- Emmitt Williams
- Zion Williamson

WEST

- Darius Bazley
- Bol Bol
- Darius Garland
- Tyler Herro
- Jaylen Hoard
- Keldon Johnson
- Louis King
- Nassir Little
- Shareef O'Neal
- Will Richardson
- Simisola Shittu
- Javonte Smart
- Coby White

=== 2019 ===
BLACK

- Cole Anthony
- Armando Bacot
- Vernon Carey Jr.
- Anthony Edwards
- Boogie Ellis
- Alonzo Gaffney
- Trayce Jackson-Davis
- Wendell Moore Jr.
- Jahmi'us Ramsey
- C. J. Walker
- Rocket Watts
- Romeo Weems
- Patrick Williams

WHITE

- Keion Brooks Jr.
- D. J. Jeffries
- Jalen Lecque
- Tre Mann
- Nico Mannion
- Tyrese Maxey
- Jaden McDaniels
- Cassius Stanley
- Isaiah Stewart
- Trendon Watford
- Kahlil Whitney
- Samuell Williamson
- James Wiseman

=== 2020 ===
AWAY

- Scottie Barnes
- Brandon Boston Jr.
- Josh Christopher
- Sharife Cooper
- Cade Cunningham
- R. J. Davis
- Hunter Dickinson
- Andre Jackson Jr.
- Isaiah Jackson
- Caleb Love
- Adam Miller
- Day'Ron Sharpe
- Jalen Suggs
- Isaiah Todd

HOME

- Jabri Abdur-Rahim
- Devin Askew
- Jaemyn Brakefield
- Nimari Burnett
- Terrence Clarke
- Jalen Green
- Jalen Johnson
- Evan Mobley
- Micah Peavy
- Jeremy Roach
- DJ Steward
- Cameron Thomas
- Mark Williams
- Ziaire Williams

=== 2021 ===
- Patrick Baldwin Jr.
- Paolo Banchero
- Tamar Bates
- Charles Bediako
- Nathan Bittle
- Malaki Branham
- Kendall Brown
- Kobe Bufkin
- Kennedy Chandler
- Max Christie
- Daimion Collins
- JD Davison
- Moussa Diabaté
- Michael Foster Jr.
- AJ Griffin
- Jaden Hardy
- Nolan Hickman
- Chet Holmgren
- Bryce Hopkins
- Caleb Houstan
- Trevor Keels
- Langston Love
- Bryce McGowens
- Aminu Mohammed
- Efton Reid
- Hunter Sallis
- Jabari Smith Jr.
- TyTy Washington
- Peyton Watson
- Benny Williams

=== 2022 ===
AWAY

- Amari Bailey
- Jaden Bradley
- Jalen Hood-Schifino
- Jett Howard
- Vincent Iwuchukwu
- Dior Johnson
- Dereck Lively II
- Dillon Mitchell
- Julian Phillips
- Malik Reneau
- JJ Starling
- Dariq Whitehead
- Cam Whitmore

HOME

- Adem Bona
- Skyy Clark
- Kam Craft
- Kyle Filipowski
- Keyonte George
- Chris Livingston
- Brandon Miller
- Tarris Reed
- Ty Rodgers
- Nick Smith Jr.
- Cason Wallace
- Jordan Walsh
- Kel'el Ware

=== 2025 ===
Team Air

- Nate Ament
- Kiyan Anthony
- Cayden Boozer
- Cameron Boozer
- Brayden Burries
- Kingston Flemings
- Nikolas Khamenia
- Acaden Lewis
- Alex Lloyd
- Trey McKenney
- Darryn Peterson
- Jaden Toombs
- Tounde Yessoufou

Team Flight

- Darius Acuff Jr.
- Darius Adams
- Chris Cenac
- AJ Dybantsa
- Jerry Easter
- Davion Hannah
- Jalen Haralson
- CJ Ingram
- Jasper Johnson
- Jalen Reece
- Meleek Thomas
- Sadiq White
- Caleb Wilson
