= C. J. Walker (basketball) =

American basketball player (born 2001)

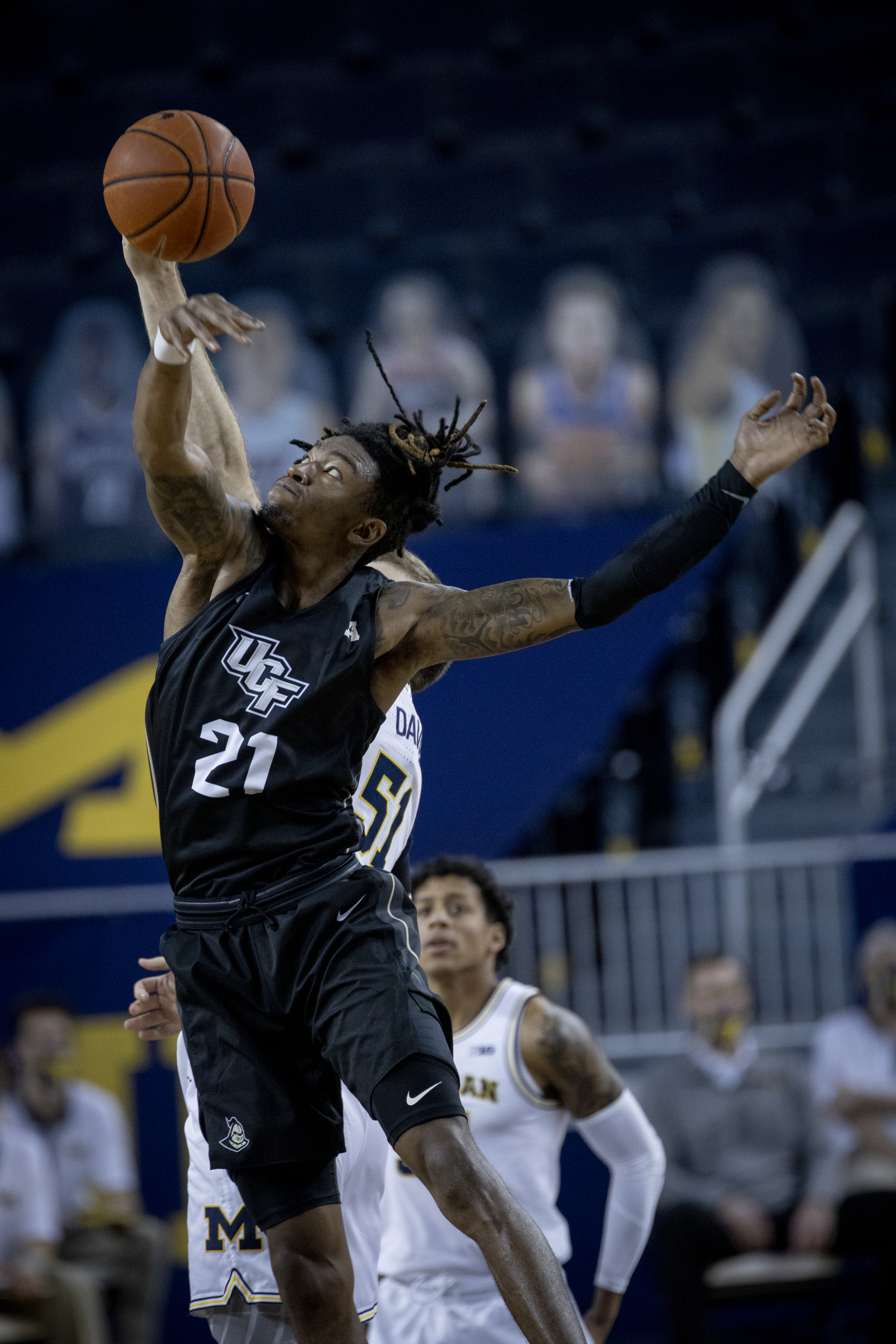
- Walker with UCF in 2020

No. 14 – Elitzur Yavne
- Position: Power forward
- League: Liga Leumit

Personal information
- Born: March 29, 2001 (age 25) Sanford, Florida, U.S.
- Listed height: 6 ft 8 in (2.03 m)
- Listed weight: 214 lb (97 kg)

Career information
- High school: Seminole (Sanford, Florida); Orlando Christian Prep (Orlando, Florida); Oak Ridge (Orlando, Florida)
- College: Oregon (2019–2020); UCF (2020–2024); East Carolina (2024–2025)
- NBA draft: 2025: undrafted
- Playing career: 2025–present

Career history
- 2025–present: Elitzur Yavne

Christopher Lee Walker Jr. (born March 29, 2001) is an American professional basketball player for Elitzur Yavne of the Israeli Liga Leumit. He played college basketball for the Oregon Ducks, UCF Knights, and East Carolina Pirates.

== Early life ==
Walker lived in Bayside Queens, New York until age 11, when his family moved to Sanford, Florida. Due to Walker's height, in 5th grade his father decided to make him play with the 7th and 8th grade AAU Panthers traveling team. As a freshman, Walker played basketball for Seminole High School in Sanford. For his next two years, he transferred to Orlando Christian Prep in Orlando, Florida, where played with five-star recruit Nassir Little and won back-to-back Class 3A state titles and won MVP honors in both championship games. After his junior season, Walker emerged as a top player in his class with his travel team, Each 1 Teach 1. As a senior, he began playing for Oak Ridge High School in Orlando, averaging 15.8 points, 13.8 rebounds and 3.8 blocks per game. Walker was named Orlando Sentinel Player of the Year and Class 9A Player of the Year and was the runner-up to Vernon Carey Jr. for the Florida Mr. Basketball award. He was selected to play in the Jordan Brand Classic in April 2019.

Walker was heavily recruited by most of NCAA's top schools after back to back state championships and a breakout summer with E1T1 Elite. On November 21, 2018, Walker committed to play college basketball for Oregon over his other top offers, LSU and Miami (Florida). He was considered a five-star recruit by ESPN and Rivals and a four-star recruit by 247Sports.

College recruiting
Name	Hometown	School	Height	Weight	Commit date
C. J. Walker; PF	Sanford, FL	Oak Ridge (FL)	6 ft 8 in (2.03 m)	198 lb (90 kg)	Nov 21, 2018
C. J. Walker; PF	Recruit ratings: Rivals: 247Sports: ESPN: (92)				
Overall recruit ranking: Rivals: 32 247Sports: 25 ESPN: 23
Note: In many cases, Scout, Rivals, 247Sports, On3, and ESPN may conflict in their listings of height and weight.; In these cases, the average was taken. ESPN grades are on a 100-point scale.; Sources: "Oregon 2019 Basketball Commitments". Rivals.; "2019 Oregon Ducks Recruiting Class". ESPN.; "2019 Team Ranking". Rivals.

== College career ==
=== Oregon ===
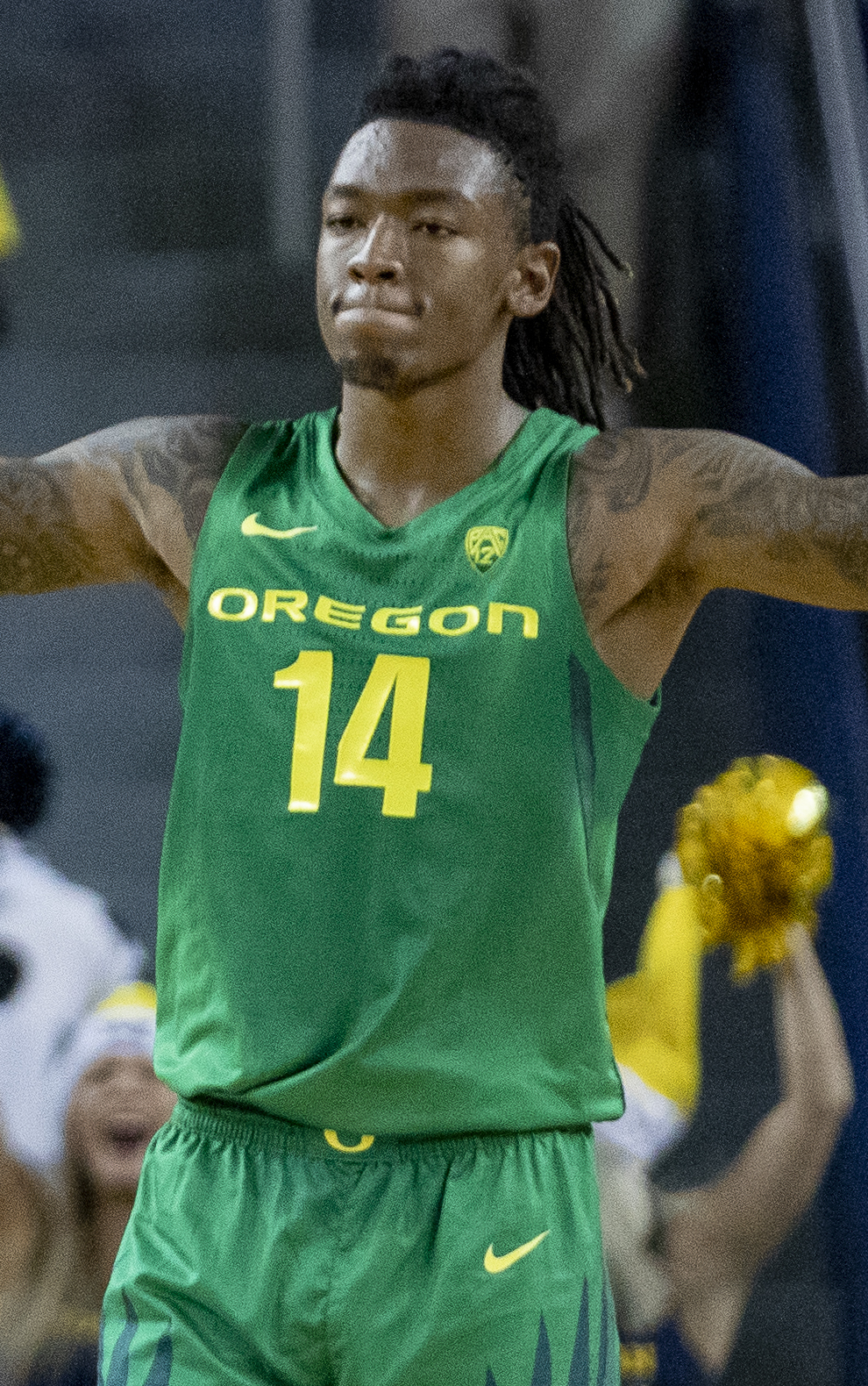
Walker with Oregon in 2019

On December 7, 2019, Walker made his first career start, due to a leg injury to Shakur Juiston, and scored a freshman season-high 18 points in an 89–64 win over Hawaii. He suffered a back injury against Alabama State on December 29. Walker played in his next game versus Colorado, before being sidelined with back and knee injuries until January 16, 2020. As a freshman, he averaged four points and 2.5 rebounds in 14.9 minutes per game. On July 1, Walker announced that he was transferring from Oregon to be closer to home.

=== UCF ===
On July 6, 2020, Walker announced that he was transferring to UCF. He made the decision to be closer to elderly and ailing family during the COVID-19 pandemic. He was granted a waiver for immediate eligibility on November 23. Walker became the first five-star recruit to ever play for UCF. As a sophomore, Walker averaged 7.0 points, 5.0 rebounds, and 1.7 blocks per game. He declared for the 2021 NBA draft, but ultimately opted to return to UCF.

== Career statistics ==
Legend
GP	Games played	GS	Games started	MPG	Minutes per game
FG%	Field goal percentage	3P%	3-point field goal percentage	FT%	Free throw percentage
RPG	Rebounds per game	APG	Assists per game	SPG	Steals per game
BPG	Blocks per game	PPG	Points per game	**Bold**	Career high

=== College ===
Year	Team	GP	GS	MPG	FG%	3P%	FT%	RPG	APG	SPG	BPG	PPG
2019–20	Oregon	28	7	14.9	.381	.290	.486	2.5	.3	.4	.5	4.0
2020–21	UCF	21	15	**25.7**	.444	.143	.581	5.0	.9	**.9**	**1.7**	7.0
2021–22	UCF	**30**	**19**	25.2	**.479**	**.371**	**.582**	**5.7**	**1.0**	.3	.9	**8.3**
2022–23	UCF	4	0	19.0	.368	.333	.500	3.5	.5	.8	.8	5.0
Career		83	41	21.5	.439	.302	.562	4.3	.7	.5	1.0	6.4
