= Benny Williams (basketball) =

American basketball player (born 2002)

No. 3 – Capital City Go-Go
- Position: Power forward / small forward
- League: NBA G League

Personal information
- Born: April 30, 2002 (age 24) Bowie, Maryland, U.S.
- Listed height: 6 ft 10 in (2.08 m)
- Listed weight: 215 lb (98 kg)

Career information
- High school: Riverdale Baptist (Upper Marlboro, Maryland); St. Andrew's Episcopal (Potomac, Maryland); IMG Academy (Bradenton, Florida)
- College: Syracuse (2021–2024); UCF (2024–2025)
- NBA draft: 2025: undrafted
- Playing career: 2025–present

Career history
- 2025–2026: Dubrava
- 2026–present: Capital City Go-Go

Benjamin Howard Williams Jr. (born April 30, 2002) is an American professional basketball player for the Capital City Go-Go of the NBA G League. He played college basketball for the Syracuse Orange from 2021 until his dismissal on February 6, 2024. He then played one season for the UCF Knights.

== High school career ==
Williams played junior varsity basketball for Riverdale Baptist School in Upper Marlboro, Maryland for two years. He stood 5 ft 9 in (1.75 m) as a freshman and was rejected by many Amateur Athletic Union programs. Williams grew 11 in (28 cm) from 2016 to 2018, and transferred to St. Andrew's Episcopal School in Potomac, Maryland, where he repeated his sophomore year. As a junior, he averaged 16 points, 10 rebounds and three blocks per game, earning First Team All-Met honors. For his senior season, he transferred to IMG Academy in Bradenton, Florida due to concerns over the impact of the COVID-19 pandemic on access to facilities at St. Andrew's. He averaged 16.3 points and six rebounds per game as a senior. Williams was named to the Jordan Brand Classic roster.

=== Recruiting ===
Williams was considered a five-star recruit by Rivals, and a four-star recruit by 247Sports and ESPN. He committed to playing college basketball for Syracuse over offers from Maryland, Georgetown and Miami (Florida).

College recruiting
Name	Hometown	School	Height	Weight	Commit date
Benny Williams; SF / PF	Bowie, MD	IMG Academy (FL)	6 ft 8 in (2.03 m)	185 lb (84 kg)	Jun 4, 2020
Benny Williams; SF / PF	Recruit ratings: Rivals: 247Sports: ESPN: (89)				
Overall recruit ranking: Rivals: 21 247Sports: 40 ESPN: 32
Note: In many cases, Scout, Rivals, 247Sports, On3, and ESPN may conflict in their listings of height and weight.; In these cases, the average was taken. ESPN grades are on a 100-point scale.; Sources: "Syracuse 2021 Basketball Commitments". Rivals.; "2021 Syracuse Orange Recruiting Class". ESPN.; "2021 Team Ranking". Rivals.

== College career ==
On February 28, 2022, Williams suffered a lower body injury in an overtime loss to North Carolina, which was later determined to be season-ending. He averaged 1.9 points and 1.4 rebounds per game. As a sophomore, Williams averaged 7.2 points and 4.1 rebounds per game. He was suspended for two games at the start of his junior season due to a violation of team rules. Williams last game as a member of the Syracuse University men's basketball team was Saturday, February 3, 2024, versus Wake Forest. Williams scored 7 points on 2–9 shooting, to go along with 8 rebounds, 4 assists, and 2 turnovers. His last play as a member of the team was a turnover.
