= 2017–18 UNLV Runnin' Rebels basketball team =

American college basketball season

2017–18 UNLV Runnin' Rebels basketball

MGM Resorts Main Event Heavyweight champions
- Conference: Mountain West Conference
- Record: 20–13 (8–10 MW)
- Head coach: Marvin Menzies (2nd season)
- Assistant coaches: Andre LaFleur; Rob Jeter; Eric Brown
- Home arena: Thomas & Mack Center

2017–18 Mountain West Conference men's basketball standings
	Conf.				Overall
Team	W		L	PCT	W		L	PCT
No. 24 Nevada	15	–	3	.833	29	–	8	.784
Boise State	13	–	5	.722	23	–	9	.719
New Mexico	12	–	6	.667	19	–	15	.559
Fresno State	11	–	7	.611	21	–	11	.656
San Diego State †	11	–	7	.611	22	–	11	.667
Wyoming	10	–	8	.556	20	–	13	.606
UNLV	8	–	10	.444	20	–	13	.606
Utah State	8	–	10	.444	17	–	17	.500
Air Force	6	–	12	.333	12	–	19	.387
Colorado State	4	–	14	.222	11	–	21	.344
San Jose State	1	–	17	.056	4	–	26	.133
† Conference tournament winner Rankings from AP poll

The 2017–18 UNLV Runnin' Rebels basketball team represented the University of Nevada, Las Vegas during the 2017–18 NCAA Division I men's basketball season. The Runnin' Rebels were led by second-year head coach Marvin Menzies and played their home games at the Thomas & Mack Center in Paradise, Nevada as members of the Mountain West Conference. They finished the season 20–13, 8–10 in Mountain West play to finish in a tie for seventh place. They defeated Air Force in the first round of the Mountain West tournament before losing in the quarterfinals to Nevada. Despite having 20 wins, they did not participate in a postseason tournament after declining an invite to the CBI Tournament.

== Previous season ==
The Runnin' Rebels finished the 2016–17 season 11–21, 4–14 in Mountain West play to finish in a tie for tenth place. They lost in the first round of the Mountain West tournament to San Diego State.

== Offseason ==
=== Departures ===
Name	Pos.	Height	Weight	Year	Hometown	Reason for departure
Christian Jones	F	6'7"	225	RS Sr.	Arlington, TX	Graduated
Uche Ofoegbu	F	6'4"	220	RS Sr.	Chicago, IL	Graduated
Tyrell Green	F	6'7"	215	Sr.	Toronto, ON	Graduated
Dwayne Morgan	F	6'8"	215	Jr.	Baltimore, MD	Transferred to Southern Utah
Larry Bush	G	6'2"	165	Jr.	Calabasas, CA	Walk-on; didn't return
Jaylen Poyser	G	6'4"	180	So.	Malton, ON	Transferred to St. Bonaventure
Jaylan Ballou	F	6'0"	175	Fr.	Santa Fe Springs, CA	Walk-on; didn't return
Troy Baxter Jr.	F	6'8"	190	Fr.	Tallahassee, FL	Transferred to Florida Gulf Coast
Zion Morgan	G	6'5"	180	Fr.	Chicago, IL	Transferred to Wabash Valley College

=== Incoming transfers ===
Name	Pos.	Height	Weight	Year	Hometown	Notes
Shakur Juiston	PF	6'7"	215	Jr.	Paterson, NJ	NJCAA Player of the Year from Hutchinson Community College. Juiston has 2 years of remaining eligibility.
Anthony Smith	SF	6'7"	190	Jr.	Sacramento, CA	Junior college transfer from Feather River College.
Noah Robotham	PG	6'1"	165	Sr.	Las Vegas, NV	Transferred from Akron. Under NCAA transfer rules, Robotham will not play for the 2017–18 season. Will have one year of remaining eligibility.
Nick Blair	SF	6'5"	205	Jr.	Las Vegas, NV	Transferred from Idaho. Under NCAA transfer rules, Blair will have to sit out for the 2017–18 season. Will have two years of remaining eligibility. Joined the team as a preferred walk-on.

=== 2017 recruiting class ===
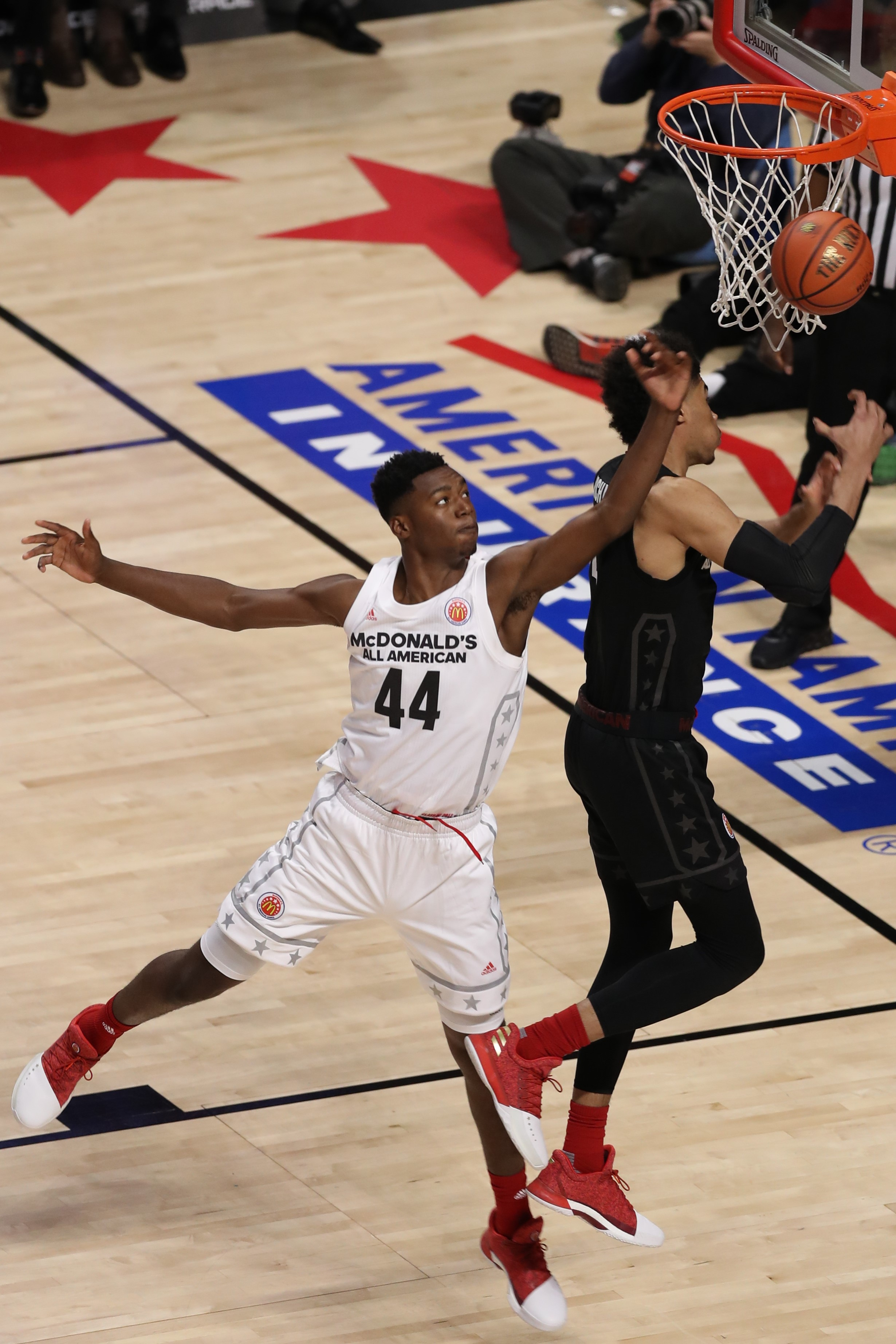
UNLV recruit Brandon McCoy at the 2017 McDonald's All-American Boys Game

College recruiting information
Name	Hometown	School	Height	Weight	Commit date
Jay Green; SG	Glendale, AZ	Hillcrest Prep Academy (AZ)	6 ft 5 in (1.96 m)	190 lb (86 kg)	Nov 16, 2016
Jay Green; SG	Recruit ratings: Scout: Rivals: 247Sports: ESPN: (68)				
Cheikh Mbacke Diong; C	Melbourne, FL	Florida Prep Academy	6 ft 10 in (2.08 m)	225 lb (102 kg)	Mar 3, 2017
Cheikh Mbacke Diong; C	Recruit ratings: Scout: Rivals: 247Sports: ESPN: (NR)				
Brandon McCoy; C	San Diego, CA	Cathedral Catholic HS	6 ft 11 in (2.11 m)	245 lb (111 kg)	Apr 25, 2017
Brandon McCoy; C	Recruit ratings: Scout: Rivals: 247Sports: ESPN: (93)				
Amauri Hardy; PG	Farmington Hills, MI	North Farmington HS	6 ft 2 in (1.88 m)	175 lb (79 kg)	Apr 26, 2017
Amauri Hardy; PG	Recruit ratings: Scout: Rivals: 247Sports: ESPN: (82)				
Tervell Beck; SF	Cleveland, OH	Cleveland Central Catholic HS	6 ft 6 in (1.98 m)	185 lb (84 kg)	May 11, 2017
Tervell Beck; SF	Recruit ratings: Scout: Rivals: 247Sports: ESPN: (73)				
Overall recruit ranking:
Note: In many cases, Scout, Rivals, 247Sports, On3, and ESPN may conflict in their listings of height and weight.; In these cases, the average was taken. ESPN grades are on a 100-point scale.; Sources: "2017 UNLV Basketball Commitments". Rivals.; "2017 UNLV Player Commits". ESPN.; "2017 Team Ranking". Rivals.

=== 2018 recruiting class ===
College recruiting information
Name	Hometown	School	Height	Weight	Commit date
Trey Woodbury; SG	Las Vegas, NV	Ed W. Clark High School	6 ft 4 in (1.93 m)	170 lb (77 kg)	Aug 1, 2017
Trey Woodbury; SG	Recruit ratings: Scout: Rivals: 247Sports: ESPN: (78)				
Bryce Hamilton; SG	Pasadena, CA	Pasadena High School	6 ft 2 in (1.88 m)	160 lb (73 kg)	Oct 23, 2017
Bryce Hamilton; SG	Recruit ratings: Scout: Rivals: 247Sports: ESPN: (75)				
Overall recruit ranking:
Note: In many cases, Scout, Rivals, 247Sports, On3, and ESPN may conflict in their listings of height and weight.; In these cases, the average was taken. ESPN grades are on a 100-point scale.; Sources: "2018 UNLV Basketball Commitments". Rivals.; "2018 Team Ranking". Rivals.

== Preseason ==
In a vote by conference media at the Mountain West media day, the Rebels were picked to finish in sixth place in the Mountain West. Freshman forward Brandon McCoy was named to the preseason Mountain West Freshman of the Year.

== Roster ==
2017–18 UNLV Runnin' Rebels men's basketball team
Players
Coaches

Pos.	#	Name	Height	Weight	Year	Previous school	Hometown
G	0	Jay Green	6 ft 5 in (1.96 m)	200 lb (91 kg)	Fr	Hillcrest Prep	Glendale, AZ
G	1	Kris Clyburn	6 ft 6 in (1.98 m)	175 lb (79 kg)	Jr	Ranger College	Romulus, MI
F	2	Anthony Smith	6 ft 4 in (1.93 m)	190 lb (86 kg)	Jr	Feather River College	Sacramento, CA
G	3	Amauri Hardy	6 ft 2 in (1.88 m)	195 lb (88 kg)	Fr	North Farmington HS	Farmington Hills, MI
G	5	Noah Robotham (redshirt)	6 ft 1 in (1.85 m)	170 lb (77 kg)	Sr	Akron	Las Vegas, NV
F	10	Shakur Juiston	6 ft 7 in (2.01 m)	225 lb (102 kg)	Jr	Hutchinson C.C.	Paterson, NJ
F	11	Cheickna Dembélé	6 ft 11 in (2.11 m)	235 lb (107 kg)	So	Scotland Performance Institute	Mali, Africa
F	12	Djordjije Sljivancanin	6 ft 10 in (2.08 m)	230 lb (104 kg)	So	IMG Academy	Belgrade, Serbia
G	13	Ben Coupet Jr.	6 ft 7 in (2.01 m)	185 lb (84 kg)	So	Simeon Career Academy	Chicago, IL
F	14	Tervell Beck	6 ft 7 in (2.01 m)	230 lb (104 kg)	Fr	Cleveland Central Catholic HS	Cleveland, OH
F	20	Nick Blair (W) (redshirt)	6 ft 5 in (1.96 m)	200 lb (91 kg)	Jr	Idaho	Las Vegas, NV
G	24	Jordan Johnson	5 ft 11 in (1.8 m)	175 lb (79 kg)	RS Sr	Wisconsin–Milwaukee	Waukegan, IL
G	30	Jovan Mooring	6 ft 2 in (1.88 m)	200 lb (91 kg)	Sr	South Suburban College	Country Club Hills, IL
F	34	Cheikh Mbacke Diong	6 ft 11 in (2.11 m)	215 lb (98 kg)	Fr	Florida Preparatory Academy	Senegal, Africa
F	44	Brandon McCoy	7 ft 0 in (2.13 m)	250 lb (113 kg)	Fr	Cathedral Catholic HS	San Diego, CA

Head coach

- Marvin Menzies (UCLA)

Assistant coach(es)

- Andre LaFleur (Northeastern)
- Rob Jeter (UW–Platteville)
- Eric Brown (Cal State Fullerton)

Legend

- (C) Team captain
- (S) Suspended
- (I) Ineligible
- (W) Walk-on
- Injured
- Current redshirt

Roster

== Schedule and results ==
Date time, TV	Rank^{#}	Opponent^{#}	Result	Record	Site (attendance) city, state
Exhibition
Nov 3, 2017; 7:00 pm		Alaska Fairbanks	W 97–73		Thomas & Mack Center (7,974); Paradise, NV
Non-conference regular season
Nov 11, 2017*; 7:00 pm, Stadium		Florida A&M	W 108–66	1–0	Thomas & Mack Center (9,457); Paradise, NV
Nov 15, 2017*; 7:00 pm		Prairie View A&M; MGM Resorts Main Event campus-site game	W 98–63	2–0	Thomas & Mack Center (8,078); Paradise, NV
Nov 17, 2017*; 7:00 pm		Eastern Washington; MGM Resorts Main Event campus-site game	W 91–76	3–0	Thomas & Mack Center (8,900); Paradise, NV
Nov 20, 2017*; 7:00 pm, ATTSNRM		vs. Rice; MGM Resorts Main Event Heavyweight semifinals	W 95–68	4–0	T-Mobile Arena (8,107); Paradise, NV
Nov 22, 2017*; 9:30 pm, ESPN2		vs. Utah; MGM Resorts Main Event Heavyweight championship	W 85–58	5–0	T-Mobile Arena (8,424); Paradise, NV
Nov 25, 2017*; 7:00 pm, Stadium		Southern Utah	W 101–82	6–0	Thomas & Mack Center (9,543); Paradise, NV
Nov 29, 2017*; 5:00 pm, ESPN3		at Northern Iowa; MW–MVC Challenge	L 68–77 ^{OT}	6–1	McLeod Center (4,546); Cedar Falls, IA
Dec 2, 2017*; 7:00 pm, CBSSN		Arizona	L 88–91 ^{OT}	6–2	Thomas & Mack Center (14,579); Paradise, NV
Dec 5, 2017*; 7:00 pm		vs. Oral Roberts; UNLV on the Strip	W 92–66	7–2	MGM Grand Garden Arena (6,317); Paradise, NV
Dec 9, 2017*; 9:00 pm, ESPN2		vs. Illinois; UNLV on the Strip	W 89–82	8–2	MGM Grand Garden Arena (9,668); Paradise, NV
Dec 16, 2017*; 7:00 pm		at Pacific	W 81–76	9–2	Alex G. Spanos Center (2,279); Stockton, CA
Dec 20, 2017*; 8:00 pm, ATTSNRM		Mississippi Valley State	W 95–63	10–2	Thomas & Mack Center (9,128); Paradise, NV
Dec 22, 2017*; 7:00 pm, Stadium		Northern Colorado	W 94–91	11–2	Thomas & Mack Center (9,192); Paradise, NV
Mountain West regular season
Dec 30, 2017; 8:00 pm, ATTSNRM		Boise State	L 74–83	11–3 (0–1)	Thomas & Mack Center (11,892); Paradise, NV
Jan 3, 2018; 8:00 pm, ATTSNRM		at San Jose State	W 82–76	12–3 (1–1)	Event Center Arena (1,376); San Jose, CA
Jan 6, 2018; 7:00 pm, ATTSNRM		Utah State	L 78–85	12–4 (1–2)	Thomas & Mack Center (12,386); Paradise, NV
Jan 10, 2018; 7:00 pm, ATTSNRM		at Air Force	W 81–76	13–4 (2–2)	Clune Arena (1,911); Colorado Springs, CO
Jan 17, 2018; 7:00 pm, ESPN3		New Mexico	L 81–85	13–5 (2–3)	Thomas & Mack Center (10,546); Paradise, NV
Jan 20, 2018; 2:00 pm, CBSSN		at Colorado State	W 79–74	14–5 (3–3)	Moby Arena (4,383); Fort Collins, CO
Jan 23, 2018; 8:00 pm, CBSSN		at Fresno State	L 63–69	14–6 (3–4)	Save Mart Center (5,385); Fresno, CA
Jan 27, 2018; 7:00 pm, CBSSN		San Diego State	W 88–78	15–6 (4–4)	Thomas & Mack Center (11,137); Paradise, NV
Jan 31, 2018; 8:00 pm, ATTSNRM		San Jose State	W 76–67	16–6 (5–4)	Thomas & Mack Center (11,344); Paradise, NV
Feb 3, 2018; 5:00 pm, CBSSN		at Boise State	L 91–93 ^{OT}	16–7 (5–5)	Taco Bell Arena (10,737); Boise, ID
Feb 7, 2018; 8:00 pm, CBSSN		at No. 23 Nevada	W 86–78	17–7 (6–5)	Lawlor Events Center (11,285); Reno, NV
Feb 10, 2018; 5:00 pm, CBSSN		Wyoming	W 85–70	18–7 (7–5)	Thomas & Mack Center (11,421); Paradise, NV
Feb 14, 2018; 7:00 pm, ATTSNRM		Air Force	W 81–73	19–7 (8–5)	Thomas & Mack Center (9,027); Paradise, NV
Feb 17, 2018; 1:00 pm, CBSSN		at San Diego State	L 56–94	19–8 (8–6)	Viejas Arena (11,180); San Diego, CA
Feb 21, 2018; 7:00 pm, ESPN3		Fresno State	L 64–77	19–9 (8–7)	Thomas & Mack Center (9,302); Paradise, NV
Feb 25, 2018; 11:00 am, CBSSN		at New Mexico	L 90–91	19–10 (8–8)	The Pit (12,080); Albuquerque, NM
Feb 28, 2018; 8:00 pm, CBSSN		No. 21 Nevada	L 75–101	19–11 (8–9)	Thomas & Mack Center (13,998); Paradise, NV
Mar 3, 2018; 6:00 pm, ESPN3		at Utah State	L 67–79	19–12 (8–10)	Smith Spectrum (5,853); Logan, UT
Mountain West tournament
Mar 7, 2018; 11:00 am, Stadium	(8)	(9) Air Force; First round	W 97–90 ^{OT}	20–12	Thomas & Mack Center (4,994); Paradise, NV
Mar 8, 2018; 12:00 pm, CBSSN	(8)	(1) No. 22 Nevada; Quarterfinals	L 74–79	20–13	Thomas & Mack Center (6,753); Paradise, NV
*Non-conference game. ^{#}Rankings from AP Poll. (#) Tournament seedings in parentheses. All times are in Pacific Time.
