= Jahmi'us Ramsey =

American basketball player (born 2001)

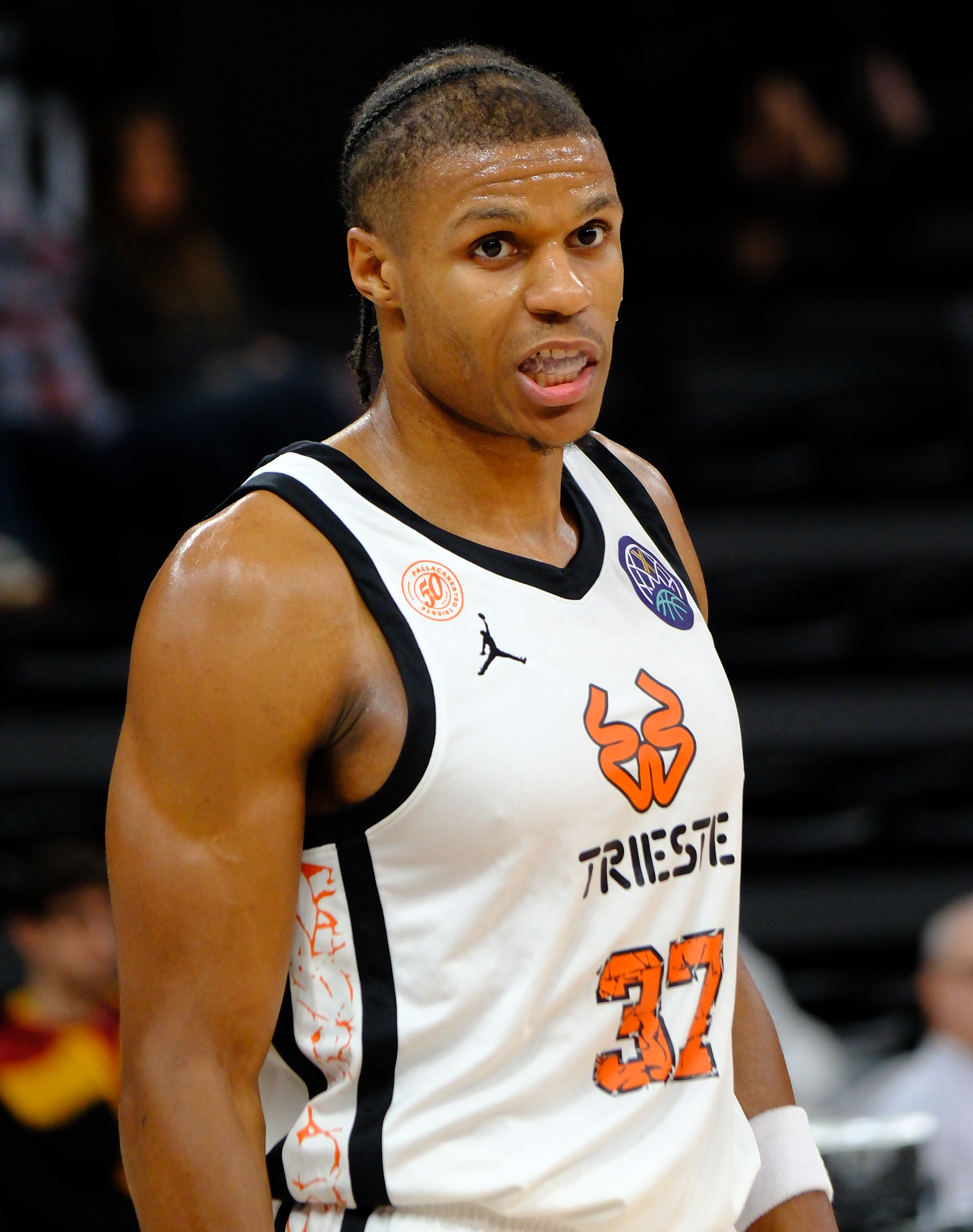
- Ramsey with Pallacanestro Trieste in 2025

No. 37 – Napoli Basket
- Position: Shooting guard
- League: LBA; EuroCup

Personal information
- Born: June 9, 2001 (age 25) Arlington, Texas, U.S.
- Listed height: 6 ft 3 in (1.91 m)
- Listed weight: 190 lb (86 kg)

Career information
- High school: Mansfield Summit (Arlington, Texas); IMG Academy (Bradenton, Florida); Duncanville (Duncanville, Texas)
- College: Texas Tech (2019–2020)
- NBA draft: 2020: 2nd round, 43rd overall pick
- Drafted by: Sacramento Kings
- Playing career: 2020–present

Career history
- 2020–2022: Sacramento Kings
- 2021: →Agua Caliente Clippers
- 2021–2022: →Stockton Kings
- 2022–2024: Oklahoma City Blue
- 2024: Toronto Raptors
- 2024: →Raptors 905
- 2024–2025: Oklahoma City Blue
- 2025–2026: Trieste
- 2026–present: Napoli

Career highlights
- NBA G League champion (2024); All-NBA G League Third Team (2024); Lega Serie A Top Scorer (2026); Big 12 Freshman of the Year (2020); Second-team All-Big 12 (2020)
- Stats at NBA.com
- Stats at Basketball Reference
Medals
Men's basketball
Representing the United States
FIBA AmeriCup
Bronze medal – third place	2025 Managua

Jahmi'us Ramsey (born June 9, 2001) is an American professional basketball player for Napoli of the Italian Lega Basket Serie A (LBA) and the EuroCup. He played college basketball for the Texas Tech Red Raiders.

== High school career ==
As a freshman and sophomore, Ramsey played basketball for Mansfield Summit High School in his hometown of Arlington, Texas. Entering his junior season, he transferred to IMG Academy, a prominent prep school in Bradenton, Florida, where he played a national schedule and started drawing more college interest. For his senior year, Ramsey moved to Duncanville High School in Duncanville, Texas, after initially intending to join national powerhouse Oak Hill Academy. He averaged 21 points and six rebounds per game, leading his team to a Class 6A state championship.

On April 20, 2019, Ramsey posted 15 points, six rebounds, and two steals at the Jordan Brand Classic. On May 4, he shared most valuable player (MVP) honors with Isaiah Mobley at the Ballislife All-American Game.

=== Recruiting ===
Ramsey was considered a five-star recruit by Rivals and a four-star recruit by ESPN and 247Sports. On November 28, 2018, he committed to play college basketball for Texas Tech over Memphis and many other NCAA Division I programs. Ramsey became the highest-ranked recruit in school history and its first five-star recruit.

College recruiting
Name	Hometown	School	Height	Weight	Commit date
Jahmi'us Ramsey; SG	Arlington, TX	Duncanville (TX)	6 ft 4 in (1.93 m)	190 lb (86 kg)	Nov 14, 2018
Jahmi'us Ramsey; SG	Recruit ratings: Rivals: 247Sports: ESPN: (89)				
Overall recruit ranking: Rivals: 21 247Sports: 42 ESPN: 31
Note: In many cases, Scout, Rivals, 247Sports, On3, and ESPN may conflict in their listings of height and weight.; In these cases, the average was taken. ESPN grades are on a 100-point scale.; Sources: "Texas Tech 2019 Basketball Commitments". Rivals.; "2019 Texas Tech Red Raiders Recruiting Class". ESPN.; "2019 Team Ranking". Rivals.

== College career ==
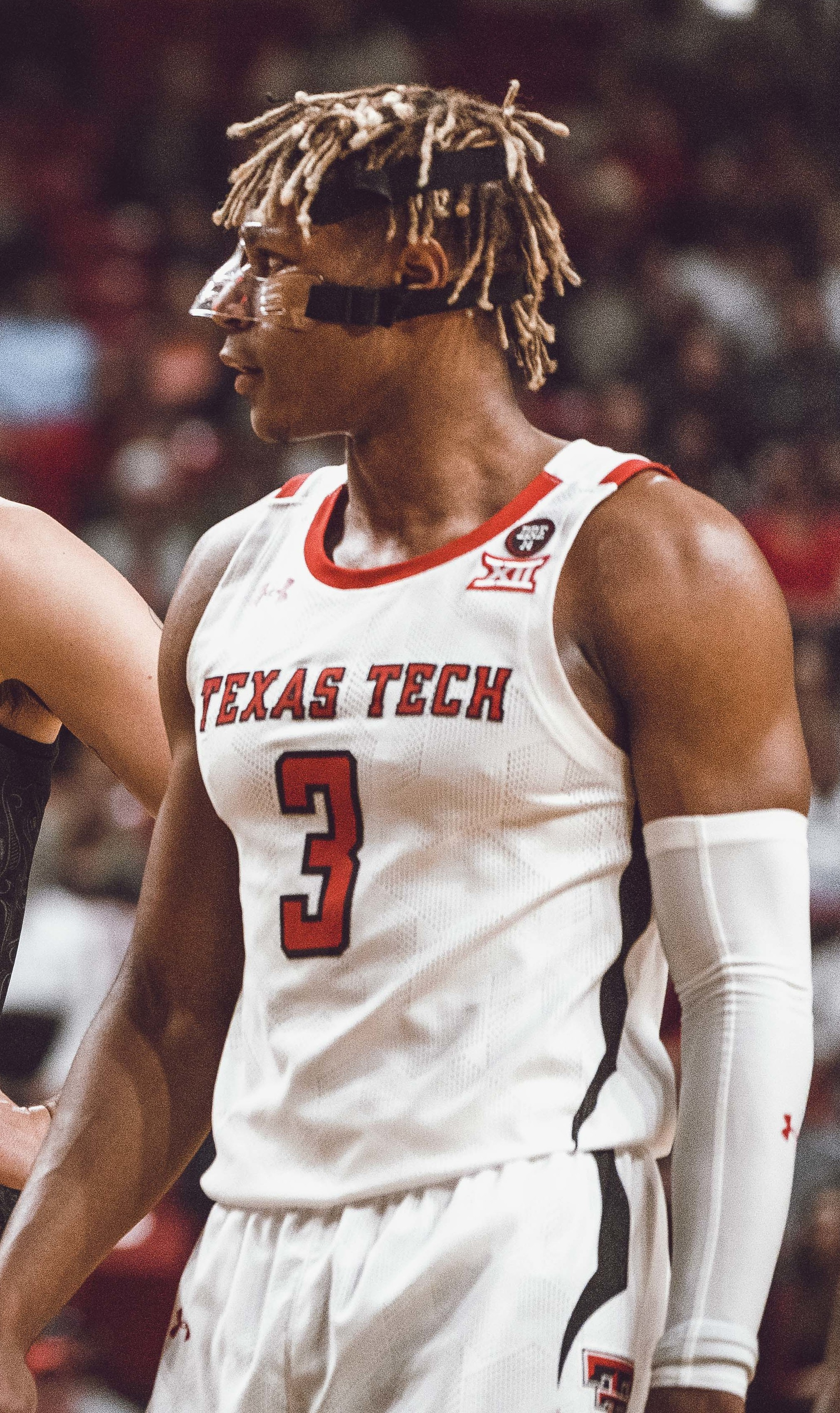
Ramsey with Texas Tech in 2020

On August 15, 2019, Ramsey recorded 44 points and 12 rebounds for Texas Tech in a 94–92 preseason win over Serbian professional team Mega Bemax on the Red Raiders International Tour in The Bahamas. He scored 19 points in his regular-season debut, an 85–60 win over Eastern Illinois. After scoring 27 points with five 3-pointers and six rebounds versus LIU, Ramsey was named Big 12 newcomer of the week on November 25, 2019. Ramsey injured his hamstring in a loss to Iowa on November 28 and missed several games. At the conclusion of the regular season, Ramsey was named Big 12 Freshman of the Year and Second Team All-Conference. Ramsey averaged 15 points, 4 rebounds, 2.2 assists and 1.3 steals per game.

On April 25, 2020, Ramsey declared he would be entering the 2020 NBA draft.

== Professional career ==
=== Sacramento Kings (2020–2022) ===
On November 18, 2020, Ramsey was selected with the 43rd pick in the 2020 NBA draft by the Sacramento Kings. On December 4, he signed a multi-year contract with the Kings. Ramsey made 13 appearances for Sacramento during his rookie campaign, averaging 3.1 points, 0.8 rebounds, and 0.5 assists.

Ramsey played in 19 contests for the Kings during the 2021–22 NBA season, recording averages of 3.2 points, 0.7 rebounds, and 0.4 assists. On February 11, 2022, Ramsey was waived by the Kings.

=== Oklahoma City Blue / Toronto Raptors / Raptors 905 (2022–2024) ===
Following his release, Ramsey signed an NBA G League entry contract, and was picked up by the Birmingham Squadron off of waivers. He was traded to the Oklahoma City Blue the following day in exchange for Chasson Randle.

On October 20, 2023, Ramsey signed with the Oklahoma City Thunder, but was waived the same day and on October 31, he re-joined the Oklahoma City Blue.

On March 5, 2024, Ramsey signed a 10-day contract with the Toronto Raptors. On March 14, he signed a second 10-day contract with the team. Ramsey made seven total appearances (including one start) for Toronto, averaging 6.7 points, 3.1 rebounds, and 1.1 assists. On March 25, he returned to the Blue.

On September 26, 2024, Ramsey re-signed with Toronto, but was waived on October 19.

=== Return to Oklahoma City Blue (2024–2025) ===
On October 25, 2024, Ramsey rejoined the Oklahoma City Blue.

=== Pallacanestro Trieste (2025–2026) ===
On July 25, 2025, Ramsey signed with Pallacanestro Trieste of the Italian Lega Basket Serie A.

=== Napoli Basket (2026–present) ===
On August 2, 2026, Ramsey signed with Napoli Basket of the Italian Lega Basket Serie A (LBA).

== Career statistics ==
Legend
GP	Games played	GS	Games started	MPG	Minutes per game
FG%	Field goal percentage	3P%	3-point field goal percentage	FT%	Free throw percentage
RPG	Rebounds per game	APG	Assists per game	SPG	Steals per game
BPG	Blocks per game	PPG	Points per game	**Bold**	Career high

=== NBA ===
Year	Team	GP	GS	MPG	FG%	3P%	FT%	RPG	APG	SPG	BPG	PPG
2020–21	Sacramento	13	0	7.3	.395	.263	**1.000**	.8	.5	.3	**.1**	3.1
2021–22	Sacramento	**19**	0	7.0	.414	**.278**	.500	.7	.4	.1	**.1**	3.2
2023–24	Toronto	7	**1**	**17.3**	**.439**	.273	.833	**3.1**	**1.1**	**1.0**	.0	**6.7**
Career		39	1	9.0	.416	.271	.680	1.2	.5	.3	.1	3.8

=== College ===
Year	Team	GP	GS	MPG	FG%	3P%	FT%	RPG	APG	SPG	BPG	PPG
2019–20	Texas Tech	27	27	31.2	.442	.426	.641	4.0	2.2	1.3	.7	15.0
