= Earl Carr =

American football player (born 1955)

No. 31, 32
- Position: Running back

Personal information
- Born: January 22, 1955 (age 71); Tallahassee, Florida, U.S.
- Listed height: 6 ft 0 in (1.83 m)
- Listed weight: 224 lb (102 kg)

Career information
- High school: Orlando (FL) Oak Ridge
- College: Florida
- NFL draft: 1978: 5th round, 124th overall pick

Career history
- San Francisco 49ers (1978); Philadelphia Eagles (1979)

Career NFL statistics
- Rushing yards: 1
- Rushing average: 0.5
- Receptions: 1
- Receiving yards: 2
- Stats at Pro Football Reference

Earl Carr (born January 22, 1955) is an American former professional football player who was a running back in the National Football League (NFL). He played college football for the Florida Gators. He played in the NFL for the San Francisco 49ers in 1978 and for the Philadelphia Eagles in 1979.
