= Emmitt Williams =

American basketball player (born 1998)

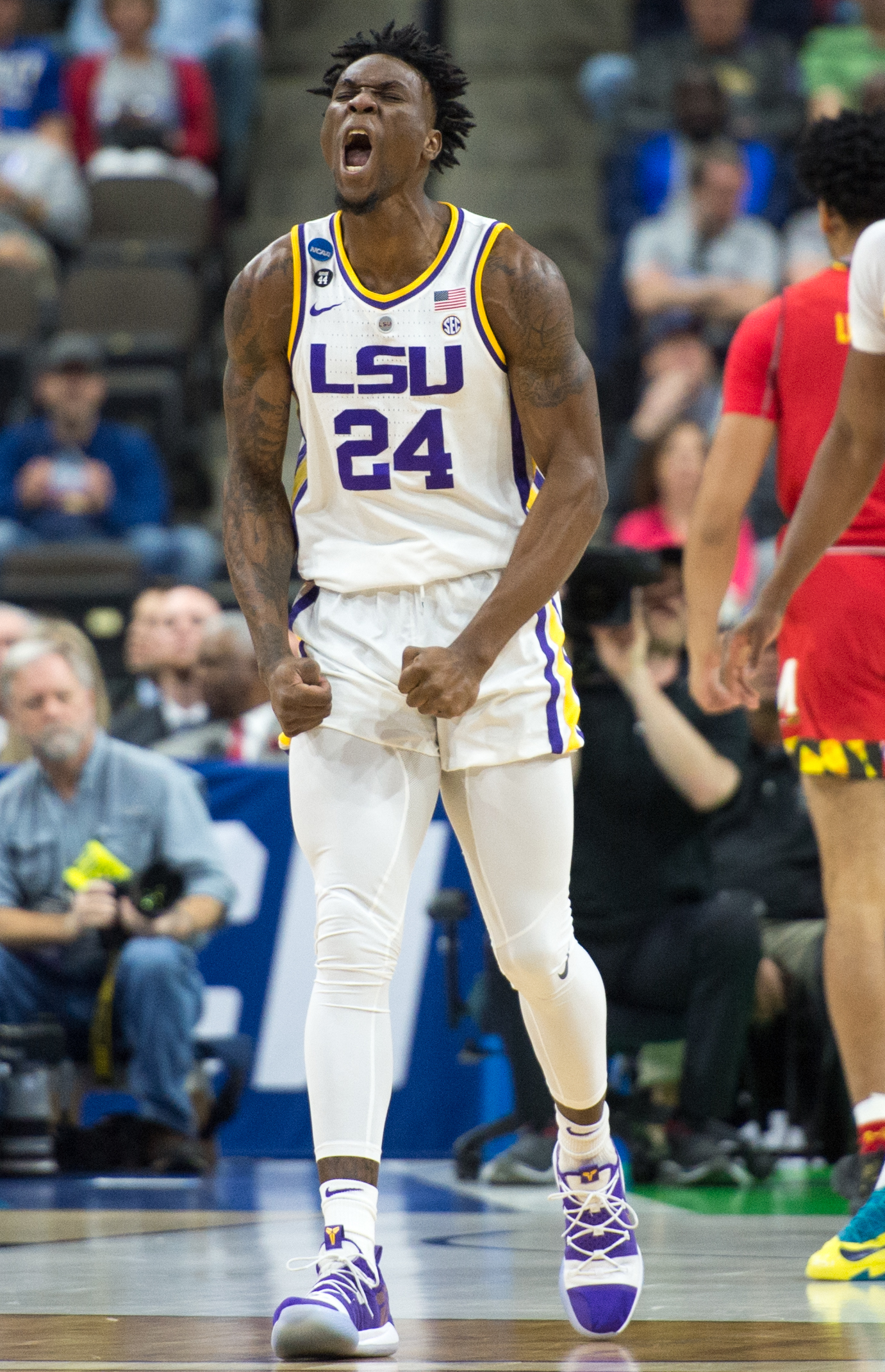

No. 55 – Gigantes de Carolina
- Position: Power forward
- League: BSN

Personal information
- Born: September 15, 1998 (age 28) Fort Myers, Florida
- Listed height: 6 ft 6 in (1.98 m)
- Listed weight: 225 lb (102 kg)

Career information
- High school: Lehigh (Lehigh Acres, Florida); IMG Academy (Bradenton, Florida); Oak Ridge (Orlando, Florida)
- College: LSU (2018–2020)
- NBA draft: 2020: undrafted
- Playing career: 2021–present

Career history
- 2021: Agua Caliente Clippers
- 2021: Hapoel Acre
- 2021–2022: Agua Caliente Clippers
- 2022: Fraser Valley Bandits
- 2022: GeVi Napoli
- 2022–2023: Ontario Clippers
- 2023: Metros de Santiago
- 2023: Piratas de La Guaira
- 2023–2024: Real Estelí
- 2024–present: Gigantes de Carolina

Emmitt Mack Williams V (born September 15, 1998) is an American professional basketball player for the Gigantes de Carolina of the Baloncesto Superior Nacional (BSN). He played college basketball for the LSU Tigers.

== High school career ==
As a freshman, Williams played for Lehigh Senior High School in Lehigh Acres, Florida, where he averaged 15.3 points and 11.2 rebounds per game before transferring to IMG Academy in Bradenton, Florida, for his sophomore season. At IMG Academy, he was teammates with highly touted recruits Trevon Duval and Silvio De Sousa and played for one of the best teams in the country. In the 2015–16 season, Williams averaged 16.4 points, 12.6 rebounds and 2.9 blocks per game, playing in the power forward position.

For his senior season, Williams transferred to Oak Ridge High School in Orlando, Florida. On October 11, 2017, he was arrested on charges of felonious sexual battery and false imprisonment. Williams pleaded not guilty and was released on $13,500 bond six days later. He made his debut for Oak Ridge on December 1, after sitting out his first two games. On December 20, his charges were dismissed after the case was deemed "not suitable for prosecution."

Williams averaged 17.6 points, 12.4 rebounds and 1.7 blocks per game, leading his team to the Florida High School Athletic Association (FHSAA) Class 9A state championship. On April 8, 2018, he recorded 44 points, seven rebounds and three steals at the Jordan Brand Classic and was named most valuable player (MVP) of the game. He broke the single-game scoring record for the event previously held by LeBron James. He also took part in the Ballislife All-American Game, of which he was named co-MVP with Moses Brown after he was the game's top scorer (31 points) and best rebounder (12).

=== Recruiting ===
Williams was a consensus five-star recruit and one of the most highly rated power forwards in the 2018 recruiting class. On January 26, 2018, he committed to play college basketball for LSU over offers from Oregon and Florida, among others.

College recruiting
| Name | Hometown | School | Height | Weight | Commit date |
|---|---|---|---|---|---|
| Emmitt Williams; PF | Fort Myers, FL | Oak Ridge (FL) | 6 ft 6 in (1.98 m) | 215 lb (98 kg) | Jan 26, 2018 |
| Emmitt Williams; PF | Recruit ratings: Rivals: 247Sports: ESPN: (91) | | | | |
Overall recruit ranking: Rivals: 23 247Sports: 31 ESPN: 21
Note: In many cases, Scout, Rivals, 247Sports, On3, and ESPN may conflict in their listings of height and weight.; In these cases, the average was taken. ESPN grades are on a 100-point scale.; Sources: "LSU 2018 Basketball Commitments". Rivals.; "2018 LSU Tigers Recruiting Class". ESPN.; "2018 Team Ranking". Rivals.

== College career ==
As a freshman, Williams averaged 7.0 points and 5.4 rebounds per game, making eight starts on a team that reached the Sweet 16. He had a season-high 15 points twice. Williams scored 13 points and a career-best 14 rebounds in a 79–78 overtime win at Florida. Following the season, he declared for the 2018 NBA draft but decided to return. On November 24, 2019, Williams scored a career-high 27 points and collected nine rebounds in a 96–83 win against Rhode Island. On January 29, 2020, Williams had 23 points and 11 rebounds in a 90–76 win over Alabama. As a sophomore, Williams averaged 13.3 points, 6.6 rebounds, and 1.2 blocks per game. Following the season, he declared for the 2020 NBA draft.

== Professional career ==
=== Agua Caliente Clippers / Hapoel Acre (2021–2022) ===
After going undrafted in the 2020 NBA draft, Williams was included in the roster of the Agua Caliente Clippers announced on February 4, 2021. He played 13 games and averaged 4.2 points, 4.2 rebounds and 0.3 assists in 12.3 minutes.

On April 1, 2021, Williams signed with Hapoel Acre, where he played 8 games and averaged 13.8 points, 9.9 rebounds, 1.6 assists and 1.3 blocks in 25.0 minutes.

After joining the Oklahoma City Thunder for the 2021 NBA Summer League, Williams was re-signed by Agua Caliente on October 27, 2021. In 23 games, he averaged 8.4 points, five rebounds and 0.8 assists per game on 51.6 and 45 per cent shooting from the field and three-point range, respectively.

=== Fraser Valley Bandits (2022) ===
On April 27, 2022, Williams signed with the Fraser Valley Bandits of the CEBL.

=== Napoli Basket (2022) ===
On August 30, 2022, he has signed with Napoli Basket of the Italian Lega Basket Serie A (LBA). He suffered a muscle injury in the calf of the right leg on September 27, 2022, and after not playing a single game, he was waived by the team on November 9, 2022.

=== Ontario Clippers (2022–2023) ===
On December 21, 2022, Williams was reacquired by the Ontario Clippers.

=== Metros de Santiago (2023) ===
On April 28, 2023, Williams signed with the Metros de Santiago of the Liga Nacional de Baloncesto.

=== Piratas de La Guaira (2023) ===
On June 5, 2023, Williams signed with the Piratas de La Guaira of the Superliga Profesional de Baloncesto.

=== Gigantes de Carolina (2024–present) ===
On April 1, 2024, Williams signed with the Gigantes de Carolina of the Baloncesto Superior Nacional.

== Career statistics ==
Legend
| GP | Games played | GS | Games started | MPG | Minutes per game |
| FG% | Field goal percentage | 3P% | 3-point field goal percentage | FT% | Free throw percentage |
| RPG | Rebounds per game | APG | Assists per game | SPG | Steals per game |
| BPG | Blocks per game | PPG | Points per game | **Bold** | Career high |

=== College ===
| Year | Team | GP | GS | MPG | FG% | 3P% | FT% | RPG | APG | SPG | BPG | PPG |
|---|---|---|---|---|---|---|---|---|---|---|---|---|
| 2018–19 | LSU | **34** | 8 | 19.7 | **.614** | .167 | .686 | 5.4 | .4 | .3 | .6 | 7.0 |
| 2019–20 | LSU | 31 | **25** | **28.0** | .560 | **.421** | **.769** | **6.6** | **1.2** | **.8** | **1.2** | **13.3** |
| Career | | 65 | 33 | 23.7 | .579 | .360 | .738 | 5.9 | .8 | .5 | .9 | 10.0 |

== Personal life ==
Williams' best friend and high school teammate, Stef'an Strawder, was shot and killed in Fort Myers, Florida, on July 25, 2016. Williams used Strawder's death as motivation to continue playing basketball. Currently, Williams is signed with NBA Agent, Michael Raymond of Raymond Representation and is Managed by Jonathan Moore at CK Talent Management.
