= Orlando Christian Prep =

Coordinates: 28.536935°N 81.31076°W

- Orlando, Florida; United States

Information
- Type: Private Christian
- Motto: For this reason also, since the day we heard this, we haven’t stopped praying for you. We are asking that you may be filled with the knowledge of his will in all wisdom and spiritual understanding, so that you may walk worthy of the Lord, fully pleasing to him: bearing fruit in every good work and growing in the knowledge of God
- Established: 1960
- Principal: Jennie Jacobson
- Faculty: 56
- Enrollment: 600 (PK-12)
- Campus: Urban, 10 acres (40,000 m^{2})
- Colors: Royal blue, white, yellow
- Mascot: Warriors
- Website: www.orlandochristianprep.org

Orlando Christian Prep was founded in 1960, and is currently a ministry of Orlando Baptist Church. The school is separated into four academic divisions including Pre-K (K2-K4), Elementary (K5-5th), Middle School (6th-8th), and High School (9th-12th).

== History ==
Orlando Christian Prep was founded in 1960 as Orange Christian School a ministry of Temple Baptist Church

== Notable alumni ==
- Keith Clanton (2009), professional basketball player who played college basketball for the UCF Knights
- Johnathan Farquharson (2011),Bahamian sprinter who competed collegiately for the Abilene Christian Wildcats
- Kai Jones (2018), professional basketball player who played college basketball for the Texas Longhorns
- Nassir Little (2018), professional basketball player who played college basketball for the North Carolina Tar Heels
- C.J. Walker (2019; transferred), professional basketball player who played college basketball for Oregon, UCF, and East Carolina.
- Xavier Weaver (2019), wide receiver for the Colorado Buffaloes
