= Brandon McCoy =

American basketball player (born 1998)

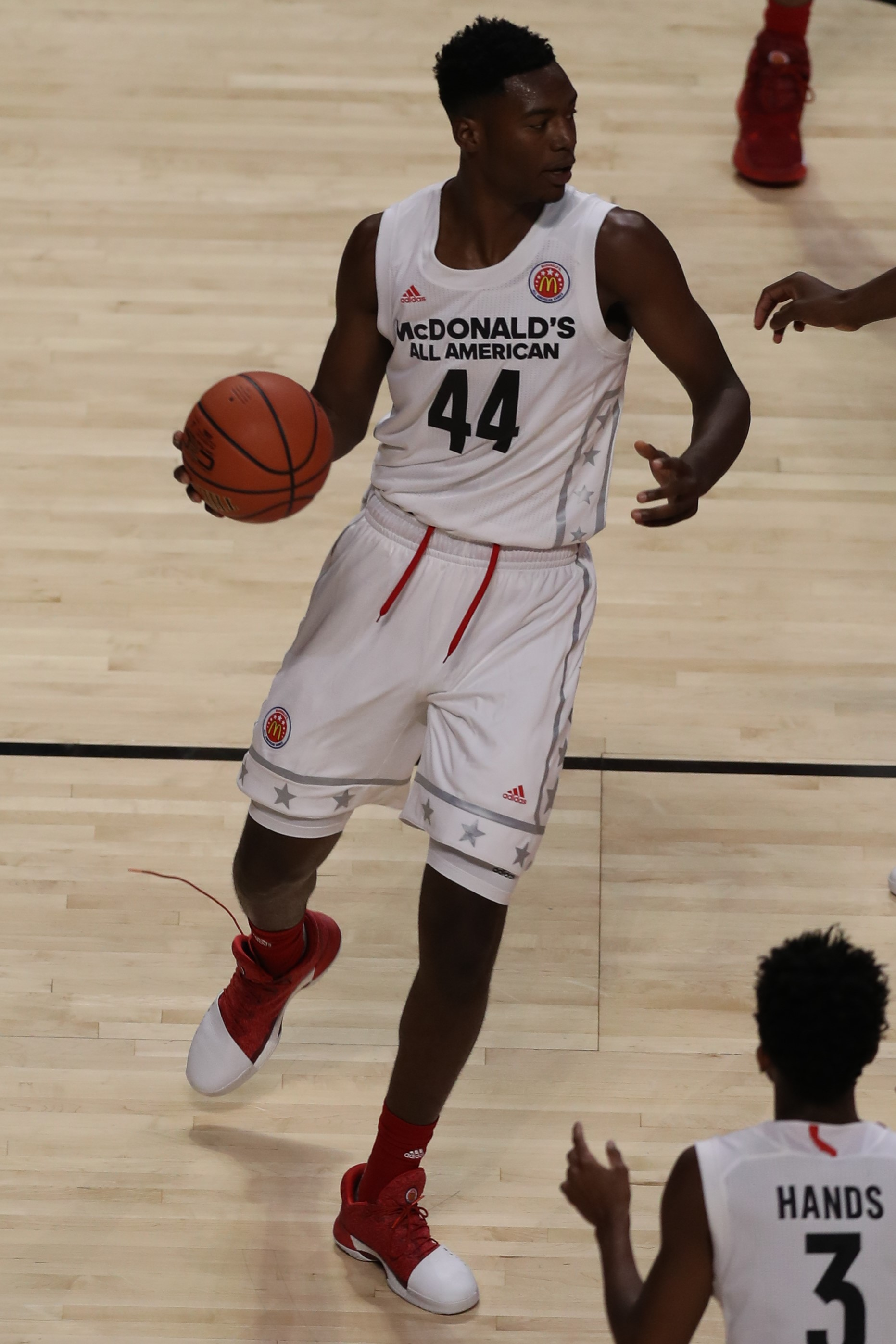
- McCoy in 2017

No. 7 – Hefei Storm
- Position: Center
- League: NBL

Personal information
- Born: June 11, 1998 (age 28) Chicago, Illinois, U.S.
- Listed height: 7 ft 0 in (2.13 m)
- Listed weight: 250 lb (113 kg)

Career information
- High school: Morse (San Diego, California); Cathedral (San Diego, California)
- College: UNLV (2017–2018)
- NBA draft: 2018: undrafted
- Playing career: 2018–present

Career history
- 2018–2020: Wisconsin Herd
- 2021: Zlatibor
- 2021: Grises de Humacao
- 2021: Filou Oostende
- 2023–2024: Sioux Falls Skyforce
- 2024: Tijuana Zonkeys
- 2024: Brampton Honey Badgers
- 2025: Borneo Hornbills
- 2025: Soles de Mexicali
- 2025–present: Hefei Storm

Career highlights
- McDonald's All-American (2017)
- Stats at Basketball Reference
Medals
Men's basketball
Representing United States
FIBA Under-19 World Cup
Bronze medal – third place	2017 Egypt

Brandon Lee McCoy (born June 11, 1998) is an American professional basketball player for the Hefei Storm of the National Basketball League (NBL). He played college basketball for the UNLV Runnin' Rebels.

== High school career ==
McCoy attended Morse High School in San Diego, California where he led the school to a state championship as a freshman before transferring to Cathedral Catholic High School in 2015.

Coming off the bench at the 2017 McDonald's All-American Game, he tallied 13 points, seven rebounds, four blocked shots and four steals in 20 minutes. He had a double-double of 15 points and 13 rebounds to go along with three blocks at the 2017 Jordan Brand Classic.

McCoy was rated as a five-star recruit and ranked #15 in the Class of 2017 by ESPN committed to UNLV in April 2017. He selected the Runnin’ Rebels over Oregon, Michigan State, and Arizona. In his senior season at Cathedral Catholic, he posted averages of 29 points, 13 rebounds and five blocked shots per outing.

College recruiting
Name	Hometown	School	Height	Weight	Commit date
Brandon McCoy; C	San Diego, CA	Cathedral Catholic High School (CA)	6 ft 11 in (2.11 m)	244 lb (111 kg)	Apr 25, 2017
Brandon McCoy; C	Recruit ratings: Rivals: 247Sports: ESPN: (93)				
Overall recruit ranking: Rivals: 12 247Sports: 14 ESPN: 16
Note: In many cases, Scout, Rivals, 247Sports, On3, and ESPN may conflict in their listings of height and weight.; In these cases, the average was taken. ESPN grades are on a 100-point scale.; Sources: "UNLV 2017 Basketball Commitments". Rivals.; "2017 Team Ranking". Rivals.

== College career ==
McCoy would make his collegiate debut on November 11, 2017, where he'd record 25 points and a season-high 18 rebounds in a blowout 108–66 win over Florida A&M University. On November 23, he would record a new season-high with 26 points and 17 rebounds in a blowout 85–58 win over the University of Utah. Two days later, McCoy would record a season-high 6 blocks to go with 15 points and 14 rebounds in a 101–82 win over Southern Utah University. On December 2, he would record a season-high 33 points with 10 rebounds grabbed in a close 91–88 overtime loss against Deandre Ayton (the eventual 1st overall pick in the 2018 NBA draft) and the University of Arizona. Throughout his entire freshman season, McCoy averaged a team-high 16.9 points, 10.3 rebounds and 1.8 blocks per game, and was named Mountain West Conference Freshman of the Year. On March 27, 2018, weeks after UNLV lost their last game of the season to the rivals University of Nevada, McCoy would declare his entry into the 2018 NBA draft.

== Professional career ==
McCoy was not selected by any team in the 2018 NBA draft, but signed a summer league deal with the Milwaukee Bucks shortly after. On July 31, 2018, he signed a training camp deal with the Bucks. On September 17, 2018, McCoy was waived by the Bucks. On September 29, 2018, the New Orleans Pelicans announced that they had signed McCoy. The Pelicans waived him on October 12. McCoy was added to the opening night roster of the Wisconsin Herd on November 1, 2018. On November 27, McCoy contributed 19 points, 14 rebounds, one assist and a block across in a 104–91 road loss to the Westchester Knicks. He averaged 7.3 points and 7.1 rebounds per game for the Herd. He was waived on February 19, 2020.

In January 2021, McCoy signed with Zlatibor of the Basketball League of Serbia. He averaged 10.2 points, 4.8 rebounds, and 1.2 blocks per game. He joined Grises de Humacao of the Baloncesto Superior Nacional on July 7. On August 25, McCoy signed with Filou Oostende of the BNXT League and the Basketball Champions League.

=== Sioux Falls Skyforce (2023–2024) ===
On February 9, 2023, McCoy was acquired by the Sioux Falls Skyforce. On August 11, 2023, he signed with the Miami Heat, but was waived the same day. On October 30, he re-joined the Skyforce.

=== Tijuana Zonkeys (2024) ===
On May 3, 2024, McCoy signed with the Tijuana Zonkeys of the Circuito de Baloncesto de la Costa del Pacífico.

=== Brampton Honey Badgers (2024) ===
On July 9, 2024, McCoy signed with the Brampton Honey Badgers of the Canadian Elite Basketball League.

=== Borneo Hornbills (2025) ===
In December 2024, McCoy joined the Borneo Hornbills of the Indonesian Basketball League (IBL) for the 2025 season. In April 2025, he was replaced by Isaiah Briscoe.

== National team career ==
He was part of the US roster for the 2017 FIBA Under-19 Basketball World Cup that captured a bronze medal.

== Career statistics ==
Legend
GP	Games played	GS	Games started	MPG	Minutes per game
FG%	Field goal percentage	3P%	3-point field goal percentage	FT%	Free throw percentage
RPG	Rebounds per game	APG	Assists per game	SPG	Steals per game
BPG	Blocks per game	PPG	Points per game	**Bold**	Career high

=== College ===
Year	Team	GP	GS	MPG	FG%	3P%	FT%	RPG	APG	SPG	BPG	PPG
2017–18	UNLV	33	33	28.8	.545	.333	.725	10.3	.5	.5	1.8	16.9
