= Oak Ridge High School (Orlando, Florida) =

High school in Orlando, Florida

Location
- 700 W Oak Ridge Rd; Orlando, Florida 32809; United States; 28.471740°N 81.384392°W

Information
- Motto: "One team, one goal. Pioneering our way to an A!"
- Established: 1959
- School district: Orange County Public Schools
- CEEB code: 101298
- Principal: Dwight Hutchinson
- Teaching staff: 110.00 (FTE)
- Grades: 9–12
- Enrollment: 2,553 (2024–2025)
- Student to teacher ratio: 23.21
- Colours: Forest Green and Vegas Gold
- Athletics: FHSAA Class 6A, District 5
- Mascot: Little Willie
- Nickname: Pioneers
- Rival: Jones High School; Maynard Evans High School; Cypress Creek High School
- Website: oakridgehs.ocps.net

Oak Ridge High School is a public high school in Orlando, Florida, established in 1959. The school had been rated a D or F institution by the state starting in 2000. In 2012, the school was awarded a C grade, breaking the low performance streak. In 2013, the school further improved and was awarded a B grade.

== Campus ==
The campus has been expanded/remodeled since the founding of the school. During the summer of 2010, demolition began on the northern side of campus as the 600 building and "Fish Farm", which had been the Tech Ed building, was torn down to make room for the new school.

== Extracurricular activities ==
Activities available to Oak Ridge students include Athletic Training, AVID, Beta Club, AFJROTC, JA Academy, Computer Programming and Gaming Club, Floetry Club, National Honor Society, AP Club, Robotics, SAFE Ambassadors, Science National Honor Society, Student Government, Yearbook, Courage Now, Youth 4 Change [Community Organizing & Social Justice] and Science Olympiad.

=== Marching band ===
The Oak Ridge Pioneer Marching Band is known as the Marching Pioneers. In the 2009 marching season, the band made state semi-finals in FMBC with their show "Spanish Fantasy," and got straight superiors in FBA. They have marched in parades including the Universal Studios Christmas Parade, the Downtown Christmas Parade, and the Martin Luther King Jr. Day Parade.

== Athletics ==
The Oak Ridge Pioneers compete in the Florida High School Athletic Association (FHSAA) in a wide variety of boys' and girls' sports. Oak Ridge is a charter member of the Orlando Metro Conference, in which they have competed since 1962.

In 2015, playing for the school basketball team, Antonio Blakeney was named a 2015 McDonald's All-American, 2015 Slam Magazine All-American, Florida's Mr. Basketball, Class 8A Player of the Year, and Orlando Sentinel 2015 all-area Player of the Year.

=== Athletic Hall of Fame ===
The Oak Ridge High School Athletic Hall of Fame was created in the Spring of 2013 when 18 athletes and 2 coaches were recognized by the school, and in their honor banners of each individual were hung in the gymnasium hallway. In the spring of 2014, an additional 10 individuals including 7 athletes, 2 contributors and 1 coach were inducted.

== Curriculum ==
Oak Ridge is home to three district-wide magnet programs: Aviation and Aerospace Engineering, Digital Media and Gaming, and Hospitality Management. In the spring of 2011 Oak Ridge became a certified Project Lead The Way school.

== Notable alumni ==
- Antonio Blakeney (born 1996), basketball shooting guard in the Israeli Basketball Premier League; former NBA player
- Neil Brown Jr. (born 1980), actor
- Earl Carr (born 1955), NFL football running back
- Craig Crawford (born 1956), political commentator
- John E. Dailey, Mayor of Tallahassee
- Michelle Finn-Burrell, track and field sprinter
- Glenda Hood (born 1972), Mayor of Orlando (1992–2003), Florida Secretary of State of Florida (2003–2005)
- Joe Joseph (born 1985), played one NFL football game
- Cady Lalanne (born 1992), basketball player
- Barbara Pierre (born 1986), track and field sprinter
- James Rolle, track and field sprinter
- Terry Reese, track & field hurdler
- Terry Billups (born 1975), NFL football defensive back
- Vernice Smith, NFL football player
- CJ Walker (born 2001), basketball power forward in the Israeli National League
- Emmitt Williams (born 1998), basketball power forward
