= Nassir Little =

American basketball player (born 2000)

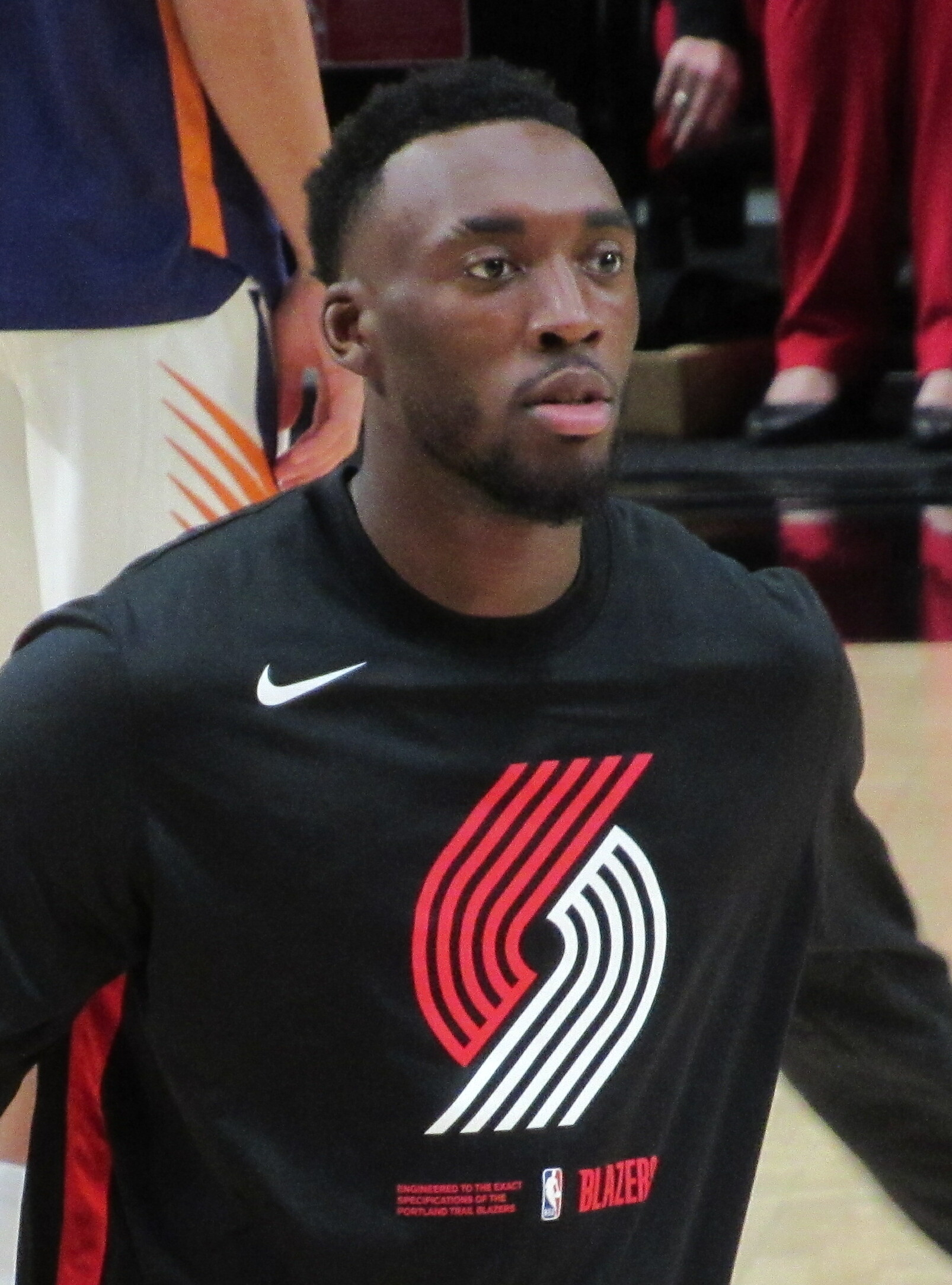
- Little with the Portland Trail Blazers in 2022

No. 9 – Saga Ballooners
- Position: Power forward / small forward
- League: B.League

Personal information
- Born: February 11, 2000 (age 26) Pensacola, Florida, U.S.
- Listed height: 6 ft 6 in (1.98 m)
- Listed weight: 220 lb (100 kg)

Career information
- High school: Oakleaf (Orange Park, Florida); Orlando Christian Prep (Orlando, Florida)
- College: North Carolina (2018–2019)
- NBA draft: 2019: 1st round, 25th overall pick
- Drafted by: Portland Trail Blazers
- Playing career: 2019–present

Career history
- 2019–2023: Portland Trail Blazers
- 2023–2024: Phoenix Suns
- 2024–2025: Sioux Falls Skyforce
- 2025–2026: Chiba Jets
- 2026-present: Saga Ballooners

Career highlights
- McDonald's All-American MVP (2018)
- Stats at NBA.com
- Stats at Basketball Reference

Nassir Shamai Little (/nəˈsɪər/ nə-SEER; born February 11, 2000) is an American professional basketball player for the Saga Ballooners of the Japanese B.League. Little finished his high school career as one of the top-ranked players in his class, having led Orlando Christian Prep to consecutive Florida state championships. He played college basketball for the North Carolina Tar Heels and was selected in the first round of the 2019 NBA draft by the Portland Trail Blazers.

== Early life ==
Little played his freshman and sophomore seasons (2014–16) at Oakleaf High School then transferred to Orlando Christian Prep, where he played for the rest of his high school career. In his junior and senior season (2016–18), he led Orlando Christian Prep to back-to-back Florida state titles. Little stood out during the McDonald's All-American Game in 2018 as he posted 28 points and 5 rebounds, 1 assist and 1 steal, to lead the West past the East and claim the most valuable player (MVP) award. He also won MVP honors at the Jordan Brand Classic after putting up 24 points in 25 minutes. Thus he joined LeBron James as only the second player to win MVP honors at both high school All-American games. Little was ranked the second-best high school prospect of 2018 by the recruiting service Rivals.

College recruiting
Name	Hometown	School	Height	Weight	Commit date
Nassir Little; SF	Orange Park, FL	Orlando Christian Prep (FL)	6 ft 7 in (2.01 m)	215 lb (98 kg)	Oct 4, 2017
Nassir Little; SF	Recruit ratings: Rivals: 247Sports: ESPN: (95)				
Overall recruit ranking: Rivals: 2 247Sports: 2 ESPN: 6
Note: In many cases, Scout, Rivals, 247Sports, On3, and ESPN may conflict in their listings of height and weight.; In these cases, the average was taken. ESPN grades are on a 100-point scale.; Sources: "North Carolina 2018 Basketball Commitments". Rivals.; "2018 North Carolina Tar Heels Recruiting Class". ESPN.; "2018 Team Ranking". Rivals.

== College career ==
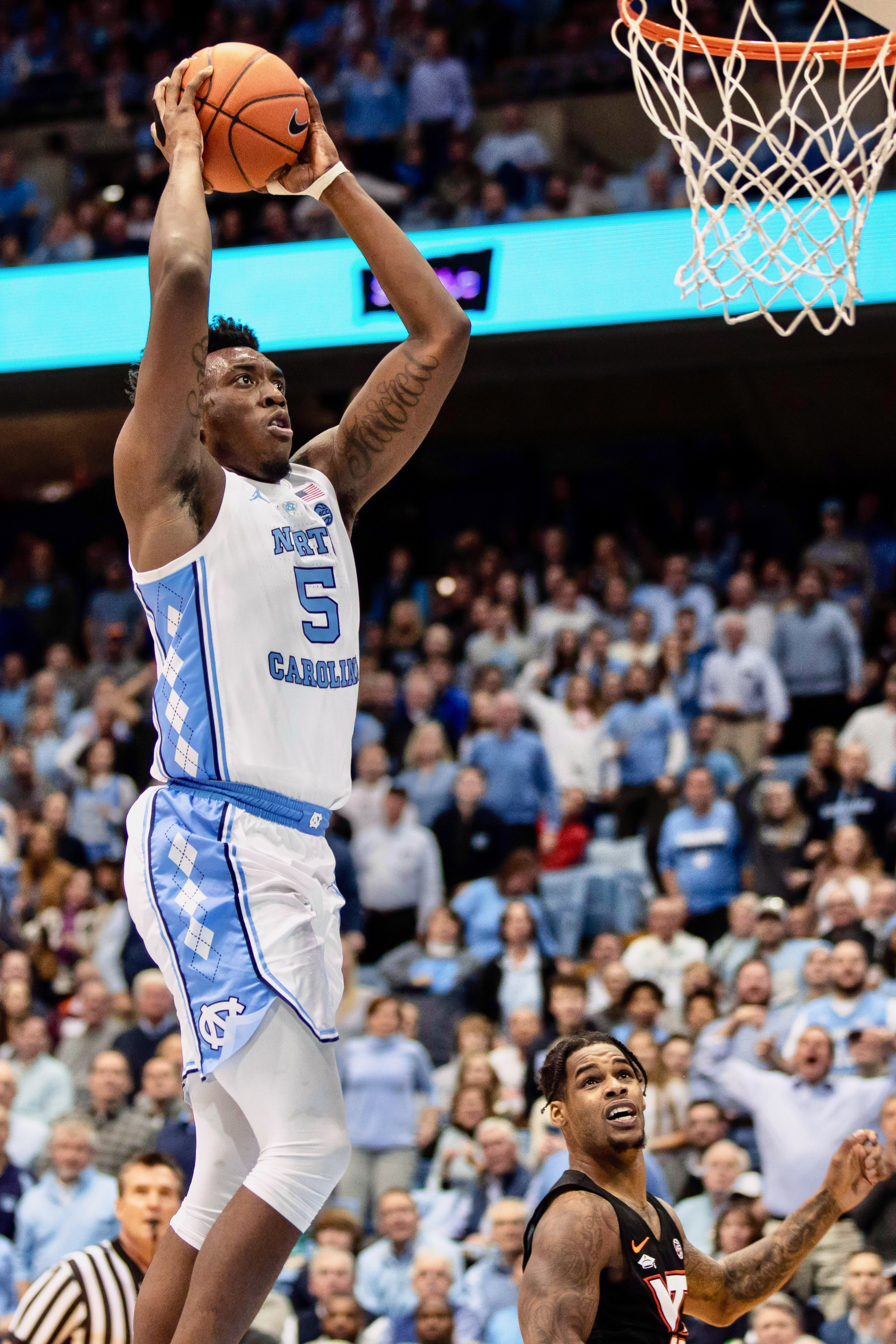
Little jumps for a slam dunk in 2019.

Little committed to play for North Carolina on October 4, 2017. He made his debut for the Tar Heels on November 6, 2018, recording 7 points, 3 assists, and 2 blocks during North Carolina's 78–67 victory over Wofford. Little scored a career-high 23 points to go along with 6 rebounds and 3 assists as North Carolina defeated Virginia Tech 103–82.

At the conclusion of his freshman season, Little announced his decision to forgo his collegiate eligibility and declare for the 2019 NBA draft, where he was projected to be a first-round selection.

== Professional career ==
=== Portland Trail Blazers (2019–2023) ===
On June 20, 2019, the Portland Trail Blazers drafted Little with the 25th overall pick in the 2019 NBA draft. On July 1, 2019, Little officially signed with the Blazers.

On February 1, 2021, Little scored a career-high 30 points to go along with 6 rebounds, 2 blocks, 1 assist and 1 steal.

On January 27, 2022, Little suffered a left shoulder labral tear. Four days later, the Trail Blazers announced he would undergo surgery and would miss the rest of the season. On May 10, Little underwent abdominal surgery on his left side.

On October 17, 2022, it was announced Little agreed on a four-year, $28 million contract extension with the Trail Blazers. In mid-April 2023, Little underwent abdominal surgery on his right side.

=== Phoenix Suns (2023–2024) ===
On September 27, 2023, Little, alongside Grayson Allen, Jusuf Nurkić, and Keon Johnson was traded to the Phoenix Suns as part of a three-team trade that sent Damian Lillard to the Milwaukee Bucks and Jrue Holiday, Toumani Camara, Deandre Ayton, and a 2029 first-round draft pick to the Portland Trail Blazers.

On August 27, 2024, Little was waived by the Suns.

=== Sioux Falls Skyforce (2024–2025) ===
On September 24, 2024, Little signed with the Miami Heat, but was waived on October 19. On October 28, he joined the Sioux Falls Skyforce. In 32 appearances with the Skyforce, Little averaged 16.7 points and 6.3 rebounds per game.

=== Chiba Jets (2025–present) ===
On July 16, 2025, Little signed with the Chiba Jets of the Japanese B.League.

== Career statistics ==
Legend
GP	Games played	GS	Games started	MPG	Minutes per game
FG%	Field goal percentage	3P%	3-point field goal percentage	FT%	Free throw percentage
RPG	Rebounds per game	APG	Assists per game	SPG	Steals per game
BPG	Blocks per game	PPG	Points per game	**Bold**	Career high

=== NBA ===
==== Regular season ====
Year	Team	GP	GS	MPG	FG%	3P%	FT%	RPG	APG	SPG	BPG	PPG
2019–20	Portland	48	5	11.9	.430	.237	.636	2.3	**.5**	.3	.3	3.6
2020–21	Portland	48	2	13.3	**.467**	.350	.800	2.7	.5	.1	.3	4.6
2021–22	Portland	42	**23**	**25.9**	.460	.331	.734	**5.6**	**1.3**	**.6**	**.9**	**9.8**
2022–23	Portland	**54**	4	18.1	.442	**.367**	.717	2.6	.9	.4	.4	6.6
2023–24	Phoenix	45	2	10.2	.460	.300	**.850**	1.7	.5	.2	.2	3.4
Career		237	36	15.8	.452	.330	.735	2.9	.7	.3	.4	5.5

==== Playoffs ====
Year	Team	GP	GS	MPG	FG%	3P%	FT%	RPG	APG	SPG	BPG	PPG
2021	Portland	3	0	3.0	.250	.250	.500	**.3**	.0	.0	**.3**	1.7
2024	Phoenix	**4**	0	**3.4**	**.600**	**.333**	—	**.3**	.0	.0	.0	**1.8**
Career		7	0	3.2	.444	.286	.500	.3	.0	.0	.1	1.7

=== College ===
Year	Team	GP	GS	MPG	FG%	3P%	FT%	RPG	APG	SPG	BPG	PPG
2018–19	North Carolina	36	0	18.2	.478	.269	.770	4.6	.7	.5	.5	9.8
