= Rosemont Elementary School =

Rosemont Elementary School may refer to:

- Rosemont Elementary School in School District 8 Kootenay Lake, British Columbia, Canada
- Rosemont Elementary School, Florida; see Orange County Public Schools
- Rosemont Elementary School, the only elementary school of the Rosemont School District in Rosemont, Illinois
- Rosemont Elementary School in the Fort Worth Independent School District in Texas
