= Jahlil Okafor =

Nigerian-American basketball player (born 1995)

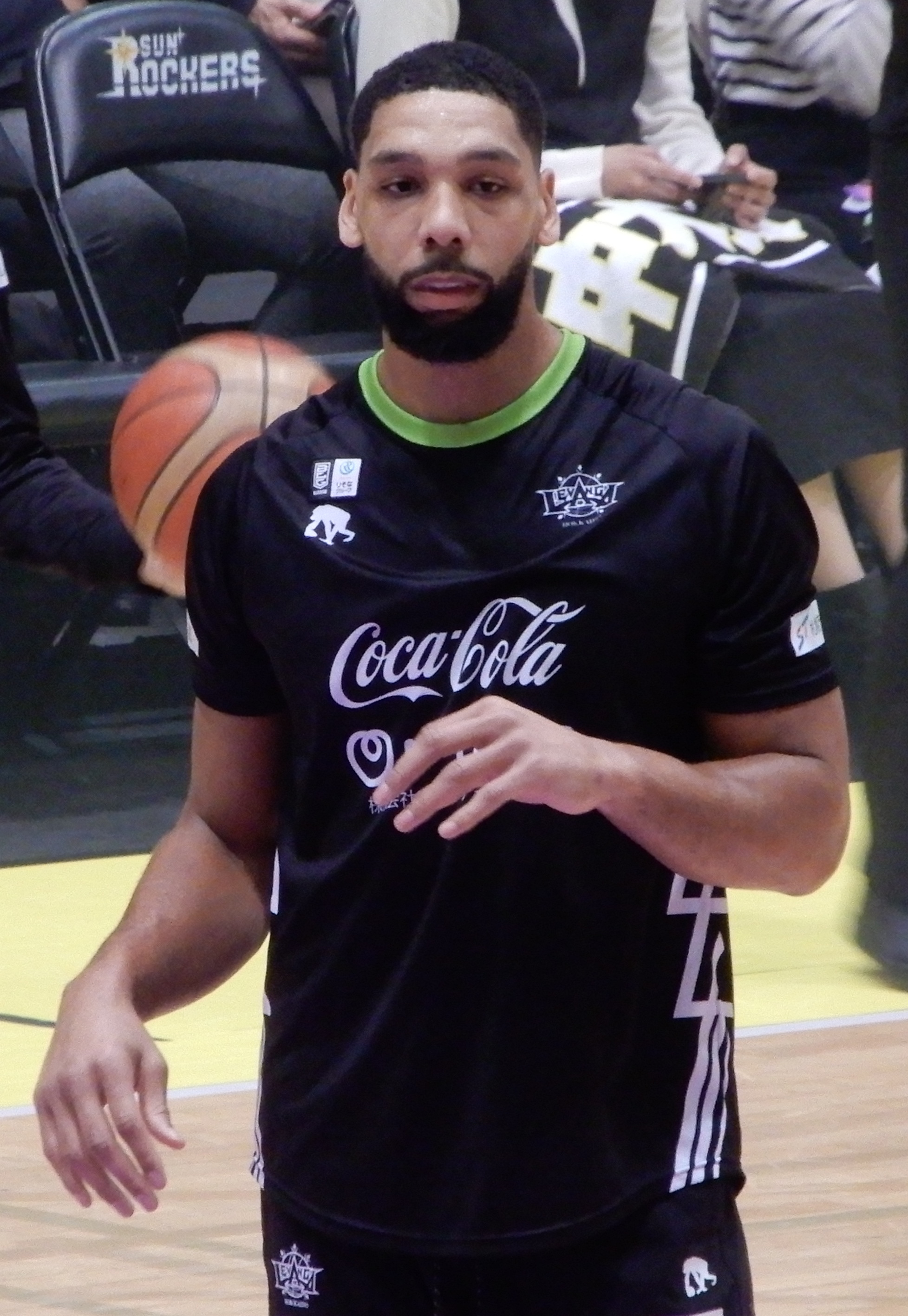
- Okafor with Levanga Hokkaido in 2025

No. 22 – Levanga Hokkaido
- Position: Center
- League: B.League

Personal information
- Born: December 15, 1995 (age 30) Fort Smith, Arkansas, U.S.
- Listed height: 6 ft 10 in (2.08 m)
- Listed weight: 270 lb (122 kg)

Career information
- High school: Whitney Young (Chicago, Illinois)
- College: Duke (2014–2015)
- NBA draft: 2015: 1st round, 3rd overall pick
- Drafted by: Philadelphia 76ers
- Playing career: 2015–present

Career history
- 2015–2017: Philadelphia 76ers
- 2017–2018: Brooklyn Nets
- 2018–2020: New Orleans Pelicans
- 2020–2021: Detroit Pistons
- 2022: Zhejiang Lions
- 2022–2023: Mexico City Capitanes
- 2023: Casademont Zaragoza
- 2023–2024: Zhejiang Lions
- 2024–2025: Capitanes de Arecibo
- 2024–2025: Indiana Mad Ants
- 2025: Indiana Pacers
- 2025–present: Levanga Hokkaido

Career highlights
- NBA All-Rookie First Team (2016); NBA G League Up Next Game (2025); BSN All-Star (2024); NCAA champion (2015); Consensus first-team All-American (2015); USBWA National Freshman of the Year (2015); Pete Newell Big Man Award (2015); ACC Player of the Year (2015); First-team All-ACC (2015); ACC Rookie of the Year (2015); Morgan Wootten National Player of the Year (2014); USA Today High School Player of the Year (2014); McDonald's All-American Game co-MVP (2014); First-team Parade All-American (2014); Illinois Mr. Basketball (2014); FIBA Under-17 World Cup MVP (2012)
- Stats at NBA.com
- Stats at Basketball Reference
Medals
Men's basketball
Representing the United States
FIBA World U19 Cup
Gold medal – first place	2013 Czech Republic	National team
FIBA World U17 Cup
Gold medal – first place	2012 Lithuania	National team
FIBA Americas U16 Championship
Gold medal – first place	2011 Mexico	National team

Jahlil Obika Okafor (/ˈdʒɑː liːl/; born December 15, 1995) is a Nigerian-American professional basketball player for Levanga Hokkaido of the B.League. He played his freshman season of college basketball for the 2014–15 Duke national championship team. He was selected with the third overall pick in the 2015 NBA draft by the Philadelphia 76ers.

Okafor had been heavily recruited before high school and was at the top of the recruiting rankings for several years. He played high school basketball in Chicago, Illinois for Whitney M. Young Magnet High School, where he earned high school national player of the year awards from McDonald's, USA Today and Parade. Okafor signed with Duke as a package with Tyus Jones, with widespread recognition as the preseason Collegiate National Player of the Year. At Duke, he earned the USBWA National Freshman of the Year and ACC Player of the Year, and a unanimous 2015 NCAA Men's Basketball All-American first-team selection.

== Early life and career ==
Okafor was born in Fort Smith, Arkansas. His father, Chukwudi, known as Chuck, is a second-generation Nigerian American of Igbo descent, and his mother, Dacresha Lanett Benton, was Bantu-American and European-American. As a youth, Okafor split time between his mother's home in the town of Moffett, Oklahoma, and his father's home in Chicago. When he was nine years old, his mother contracted bronchitis and died two weeks later from a collapsed lung. Okafor permanently moved in with his father to the South Side of Chicago and then to Rosemont. Okafor attended Rosemont Elementary. The adjustment was difficult because he was shy and so tall that other students thought he was put in the class for having failed. In November 2008, during seventh grade, he matched his father's height of 6 feet 5 inches (1.96 m). Later the family moved to Chicago's North Side so that Okafor could attend Whitney Young High School.

As a 6-foot-7-inch (2.01 m) eighth-grader, Okafor was recruited by DePaul Blue Demons men's basketball, in violation of National Collegiate Athletic Association (NCAA) recruiting rules, when DePaul Athletic Director Jean Lenti Ponsetto made public comments about an offer. Initially, interim coach Tracy Webster, made an oral offer on January 30 outside the DePaul locker room at Allstate Arena. The offer was noted online by ESPNChicago.com and picked up by the press, leading to the problematic statements by Ponsetto. In February 2010, Ponsetto confirmed in a statement:

This is a young guy we've been talking with for a long time, and who has been to games and we have a relationship with because his uncle works for the Rosemont Police Department...I think it's a prospect who has grown up around DePaul basketball. I think he's probably a fan and someone who has been a fan for some time, since we have played in Rosemont for the last 30 years.

== High school career ==
=== Freshman and sophomore seasons ===
Okafor and Whitney Young teammate Paul White were regarded as the best incoming freshmen in the Chicago metropolitan area, according to the Chicago Sun-Times's Joe Henricksen. They joined a team with six returning seniors that had finished as state runners up the prior year. Along with 6 ft 10 in (2.08 m) sophomore Thomas Hamilton Jr. and White, Okafor was part of a trio of Whitney Young players ranked in the top 10 of their respective national classes by ESPNU. Entering the season, Whitney Young was considered to resemble a college team due to its size and athleticism. That year, Okafor feels he was not one of the "key players" on the team, but attending tournaments with elite players such as Austin Rivers and Michael Kidd-Gilchrist inspired him to be one.

Following his freshman season, Okafor was regarded as the second best college basketball prospect in the Chicago area behind Jabari Parker. The scouting report on him was that he possessed an improved mid-range jump shot, nimble feet, soft hands and physical skills at 6-foot-9-inch (2.06 m) that made him a mismatch against almost any high school competitor. Prior to his sophomore season Dave Spahn of SLAM Magazine described Okafor as a player with the footwork and ambidexterity to dominate his opponents, placing him in the conversation for the role of best player in the national class of 2014. In August 2011, ESPN ranked him as the third best player in the class of 2014.

Okafor and White were featured in Ball So Hard, the first documentary short by Life + Times.

On December 22, in front of an audience that included John Calipari, Rick Pitino, Derrick Rose and Anthony Davis at the UIC Pavilion, Okafor had 20 points (10 in the fourth quarter), nine rebounds and three blocked shots against cross-town rival Simeon and its star Parker in a 62–55 loss.

Following the season, the Chicago Sun-Times named him to the Class 4A All-State first team along with Parker, Keith Carter, Darius Paul and Fred VanVleet. The Chicago Tribune named him to its second team All-State team. The Associated Press named him to its Class 4A second team. He was also selected by the Chicago Public League Basketball Coaches Association to its 25-man boy's All-City team. The Chicago Sun-Times named him to its All-Public League second team as well as its All-area 20-man team. By the end of his sophomore season, he started appearing on ballots from ESPN HS's 10-person panel for the Mr. Basketball USA award as the best high school basketball player in the country. He was one of twenty sophomores chosen as Underclass All-Americans by ESPN HS.

=== Junior season ===
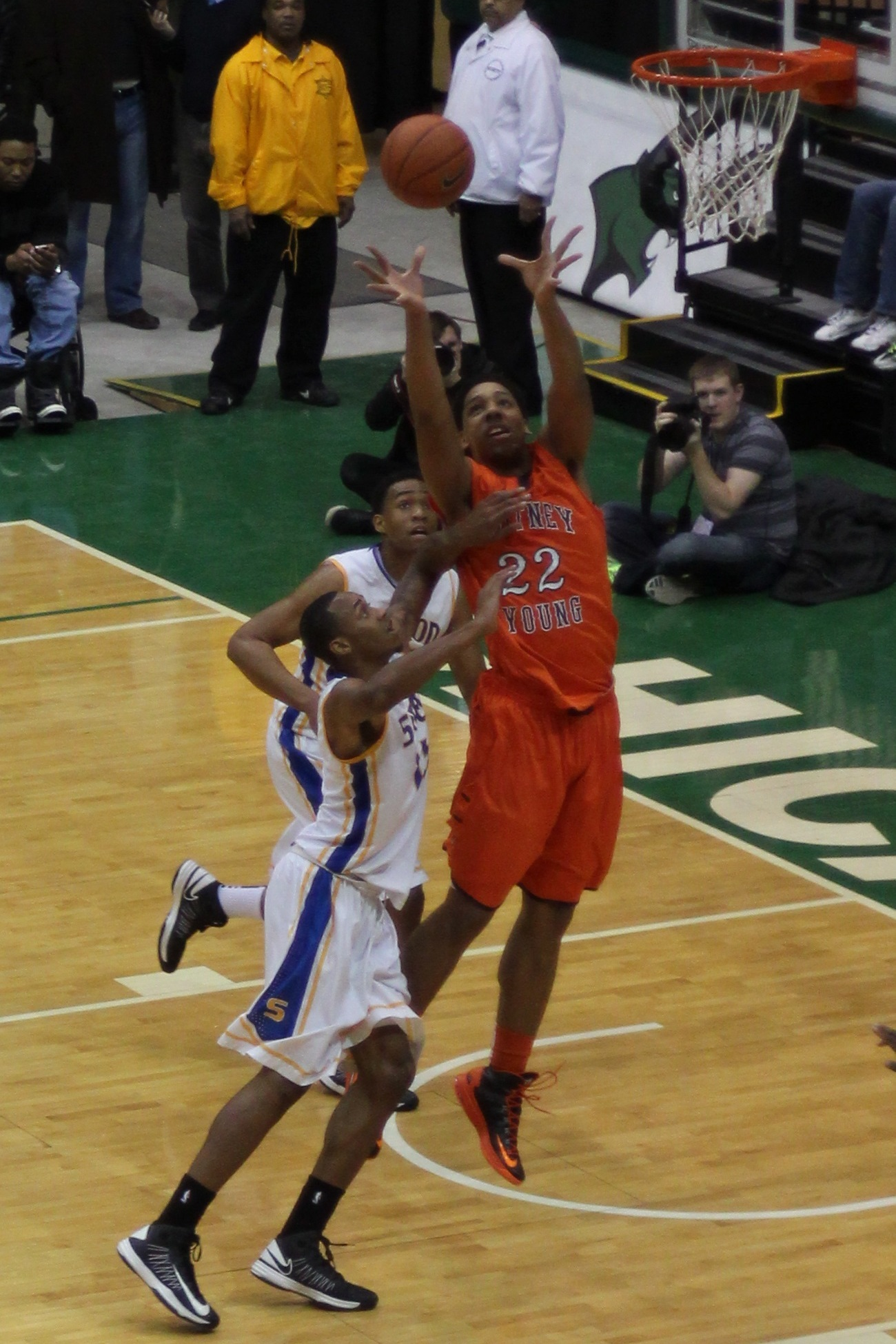
Okafor jumping for a rebound against Simeon Career Academy on January 26, 2013

In June 2012, Sports Illustrated named him one of their "Future Game Changers", a group of fourteen young athletes who are considered to be the brightest talents of their respective sport (such as Sarah Hendrickson, Jabrill Peppers, and Taylor Townsend). On September 19, Calipari offered Okafor a scholarship to play for Kentucky, joining Ohio State, Michigan State, Louisville, Illinois, Duke, North Carolina, Florida and Arizona as programs that have offered Okafor.

Okafor was one of 10 USA Today preseason All-USA selections (along with Aaron Gordon, Andrew Harrison, Aaron Harrison, Kasey Hill, Jones, Parker, Julius Randle, Noah Vonleh, Andrew Wiggins). Okafor was named as one of the top 5 Illinois Mr. Basketball contenders (along with Parker, Kendrick Nunn, Sterling Brown and Malcolm Hill) prior to the season by the Chicago Tribune's Mike Helfgot. Whitney Young was the number eight ranked team in the MaxPreps.com national preseason poll. Young entered the season ranked fourteenth in the nation according to ESPN.

On December 20 Okafor and Young lost in overtime to Dakari Johnson's ESPN #1-ranked Montverde Academy. Young was ranked #9 at the time. On January 19, Okafor led Young to an 85–52 victory over Long Beach Polytechnic High School at the Hoophall Classic with 26 points, 7 rebounds and 3 blocks. The victory gave Young a 7–1 record against nationally ranked teams for the year, moving Young to #2 in the USA Today rankings as they prepared for the January 26 crosstown showdown against Simeon and Parker.

In the Chicago Public High School League playoffs February 15 finals contest against Morgan Park High School Okafor tallied 19 points, 14 rebounds and 7 blocked shots, including a game-saving block against Billy Garrett Jr., in a 60–56 overtime Public League Championship game victory over Morgan Park.

Okafor was recognized as a 2013 All-Public League first team selection by the Chicago Sun-Times along with Nunn, Parker, Alexander and Billy Garrett Jr. On February 28, he was named the Chicago Sun-Times Player of the Year. On March 25, Okafor finished as runner-up in the Illinois Mr. Basketball voting to Parker by a 315–277-point margin, including a 43–40 first place vote margin. On April 17, he was a first team All-USA selection by USA Today along with Wiggins, Aaron Harrison, Randle and Parker. Following the demise of ESPN HS, HighSchoolHardwood.com undertook several honoraria selections. Although MaxPreps.com did not select him as a first team All-American, they did select him as a Junior All-American along with Stanley Johnson, Joel Berry, Jones, and Emmanuel Mudiay.

=== Senior season ===
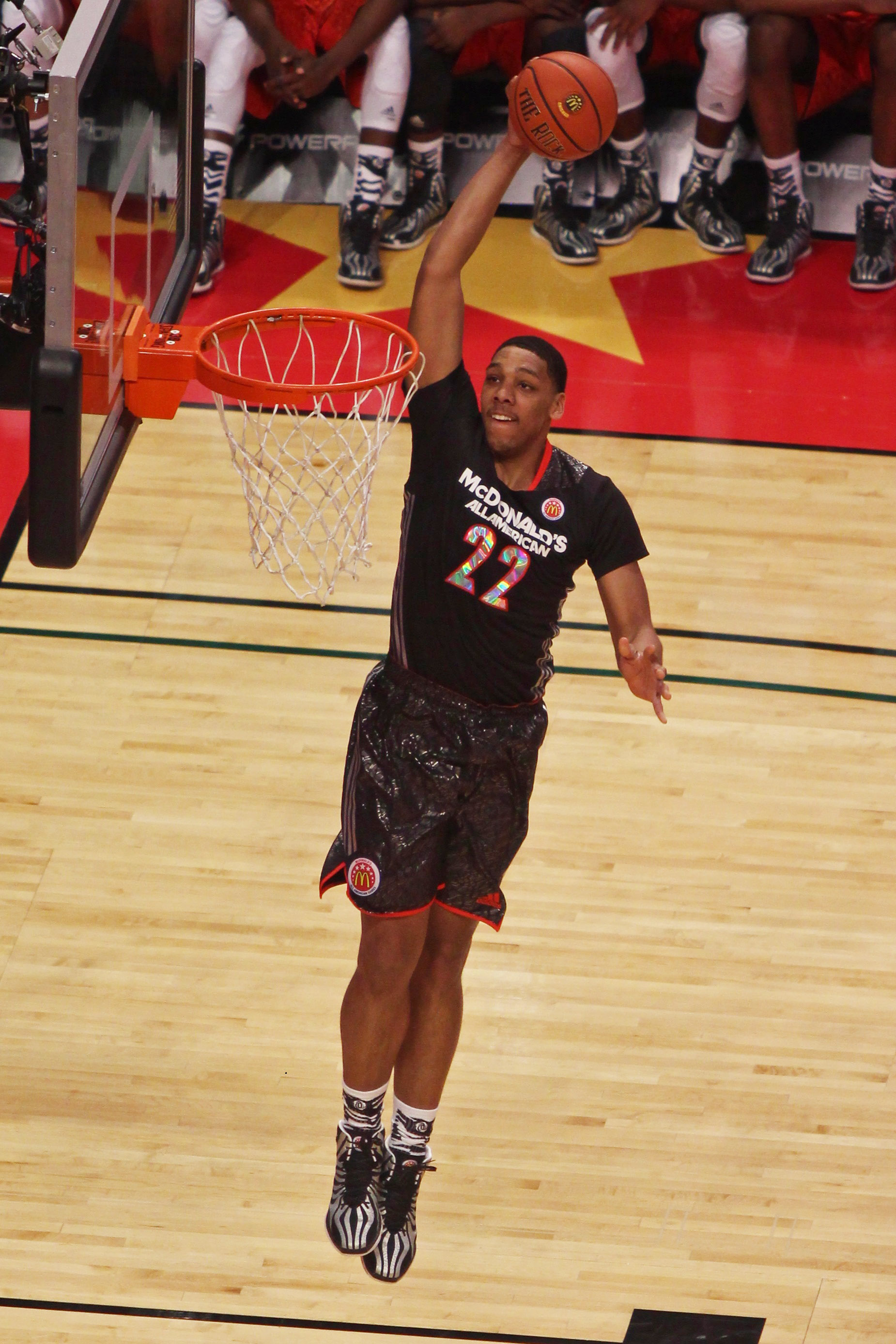
Okafor dunking during the 2014 McDonald's All-American Boys Game

Following his time with Team USA, Okafor participated in the Nike Pro-Am Chi-League, the All-Peach Jam, and the Adidas Nations event. He made his verbal commitment on ESPNU to Duke basketball on November 15, jointly with Tyus Jones. Prior to his senior season, USA Today named him to its 10-man preseason All-USA team along with Alexander, Stanley Johnson, Jones, Trey Lyles, Mudiay, Malik Newman, Kelly Oubre, D'Angelo Russell, and Myles Turner. On November 21, Winslow committed to Duke, giving them the number one recruiting class in the nation with Jones, Okafor, Winslow and Grayson Allen all committed. Okafor was joined on the Chicago Tribune's preseason Illinois Mr. Basketball top 5 by Alexander, Jalen Brunson, Tyler Ulis and Keita Bates-Diop.

Okafor dominated the December 27–30, Les Schwab Invitational hosted by Liberty High School by leading the tournament in scoring (31) and rebounding (12.5) and finished 2013 atop the three major recruiting databases (ESPN, Rivals and Scout). Young went 2–2 in the tournament, losing to Rainier Beach High School as well as losing to Oregon's defending Class 6A state champions West Linn High School. On January 4 at the Cancer Research Classic in Wheeling, West Virginia, Okafor earned the tournament MVP based on a 24-point and nine-rebound performance against Mudiay's Prime Prep Academy.

Okafor and Young reached an anticipated city championship matchup with Curie and Alexander at the Jones Convocation Center. Okafor had 16 points, 14 rebounds and 3 blocks. Curie won the city championship 69–66 in quadruple overtime as Okafor had 16 points before fouling out with 2:13 remaining in regulation. The CPL Championship game was attended by Mayor of Chicago Rahm Emanuel and was the lead story on the late edition of SportsCenter.

On March 14, Okafor posted 35 points and 13 rebounds in a 75–66 victory over St. Rita of Cascia High School (who featured Kentucky-bound Charles Matthews), earning Young its first sectional title since 2009 and leaving them one victory away from the final four. On March 18, Okafor led Young to a 58–32 victory over Loyola Academy with 12 points, 12 rebounds, 7 assists and 3 blocks. On March 21 Okafor's 33 points and 14 rebounds enabled Young to overcome a record setting 56-point performance by Brunson with a 75–68 victory over Stevenson High School. On March 22, Okafor and Young won the IHSA Class 4A state championship by defeating Benet Academy 46–44. Okafor only produced 8 points, 6 rebounds and 3 assists as he battled Xavier-bound Sean O'Mara.

Okafor dunking in postseason play
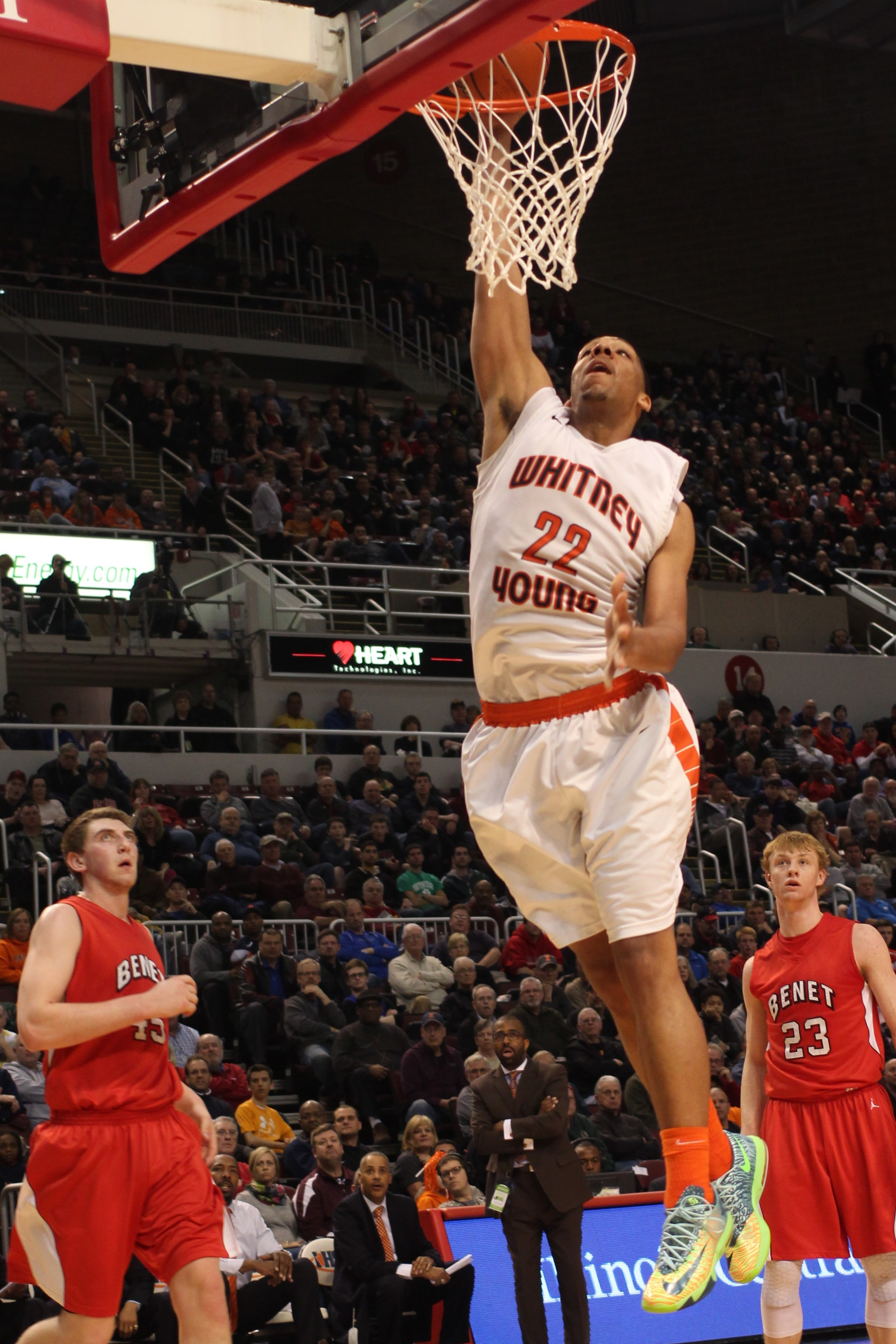
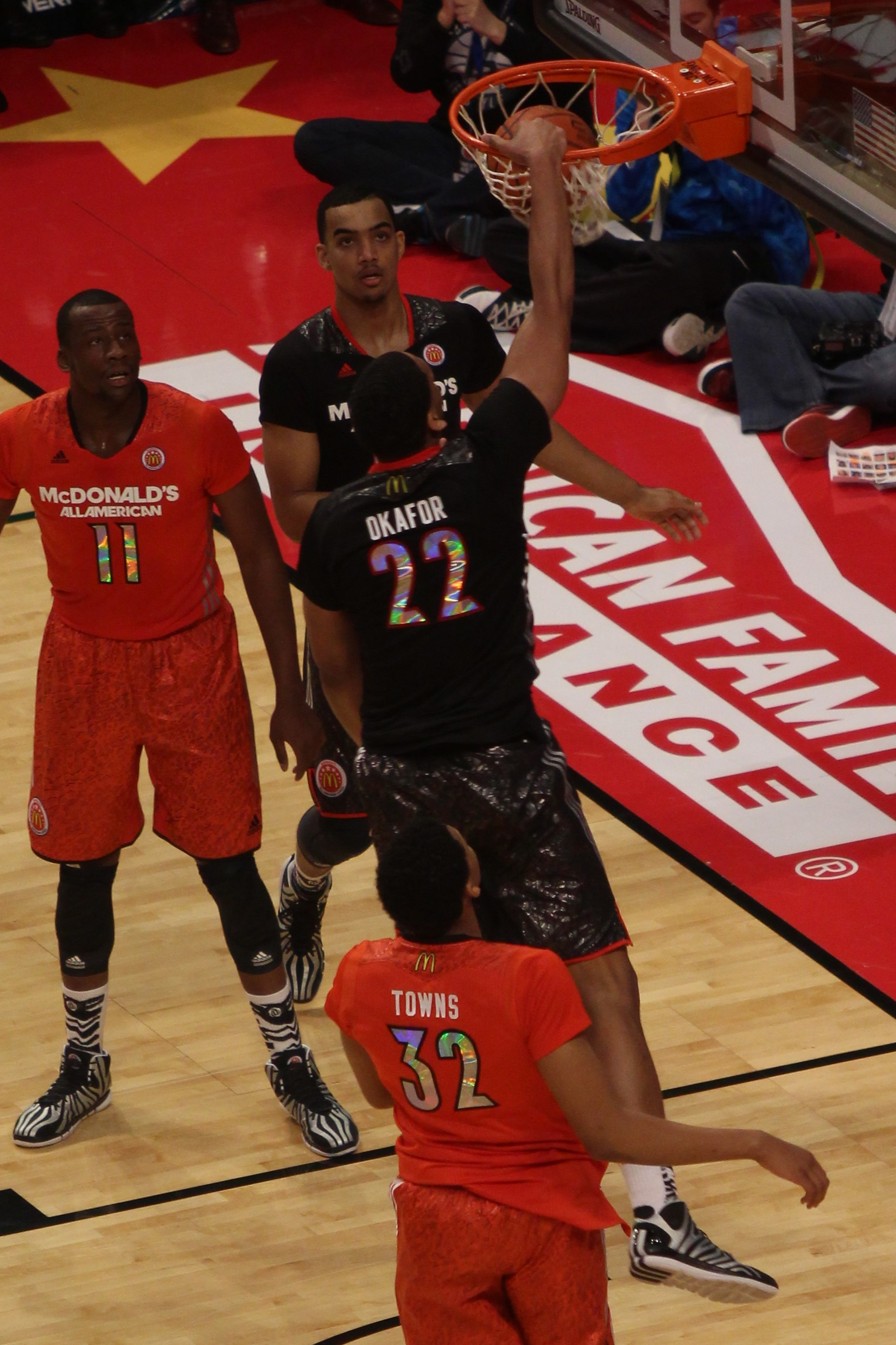
(left) The 2014 IHSA championship game; (right) dunk for a 103–102 west lead with fewer than 40 seconds left in the 105–102 2014 McDonald's Game victory

Okafor earned co-MVP (with Justin Jackson) of the April 2, 2014, McDonald's All-American Game after posting 17 points and 7 rebounds, including the go ahead dunk with fewer than 40 seconds remaining, for the winning west team in a 105–102 victory. On April 12, he posted a 14-point 10-rebound double-double in an 84–73 Team USA Nike Hoops Summit victory over the world team. On April 18 in the Jordan Brand Classic, he earned co-MVP with (Alexander) by posting 29 points and 9 rebounds.

Okafor was selected to the 10-man Team USA for the 17th annual Nike Hoop Summit on April 12, 2014, at the Moda Center. He was also selected to the 24-player 37th annual April 2, 2014 McDonald's All-American Boys Game at the United Center. He was recognized as first team All-City along with teammate White, Alexander, Louis Adams Jr. of Orr, and Luwane Pipkins of Bogan High School by the Chicago Sun-Times. On February 18, he became one of three finalists for the Naismith Prep Player of the Year Award along with Alexander and Stanley Johnson.

He was selected as the 2014 National Player of the Year from among the 20 Parade All-Americans. He was also recognized by the McDonald's All-American Game organization as its 2014 Morgan Wootten National Player of the Year. USA Today recognized Okafor as its national player of the year when naming its All-USA Boys Basketball Team along with Alexander, Oubre, Mudiay, and Stanley Johnson. Okafor beat Alexander in the Illinois Mr. Basketball voting by a 492–402 vote. He earned first team All-American recognition from MaxPreps on April 13. Okafor was named the 2013–14 Chicago Tribune/WGN Ch. 9 Athlete of the Year.

=== Rankings ===
Okafor's last Chicago Public High School League basket, which was against Cliff Alexander in the 2014 championship game

In 2011, center Dakari Johnson was named National Freshman of the Year by ESPN HS. In the following months, Okafor beat out Johnson for a spot on the 2011 FIBA Americas Under-16 Championship Team USA. Okafor spent his sophomore season ranked as the number one center and second best player in the national class of 2014 by SLAM Magazine behind Andrew Wiggins, according to SLAM's Franklyn Calle. In January 2012 during his sophomore season, he was ranked third in the class by ESPNU. By April, he was ranked second. By the end of his second year, there was talk that with Jabari Parker Chicago might produce the number one high school player in the country in back to back years, something that they had come close to with Mark Aguirre and Isiah Thomas in the late 1970s. Also in the 1981 NBA draft Aguirre and Thomas were selected first and second, respectively. On October 25, 2012, Andrew Wiggins announced that he was reclassifying into the class of 2013, which cleared the way for Okafor to assume the number one ranking in the Rivals.com ranking for the class of 2014. As of November 2012, he was listed number one in the national class of 2014 by Rivals.com and number two by ESPN. He remained number one according to Rivals with its March 14, 2013 rankings update, following his junior season.

College recruiting
Name	Hometown	School	Height	Weight	Commit date
Jahlil Okafor; C	Chicago, IL	Whitney Young (IL)	6 ft 9 in (2.06 m)	267.5 lb (121.3 kg)	Nov 15, 2013
Jahlil Okafor; C	Recruit ratings: Scout: Rivals: 247Sports: ESPN:				
Overall recruit ranking: Scout: 1, 1 (C) Rivals: 1, 1 (C) ESPN: 1, 1 (IL), 1 (C)
Note: In many cases, Scout, Rivals, 247Sports, On3, and ESPN may conflict in their listings of height and weight.; In these cases, the average was taken. ESPN grades are on a 100-point scale.; Sources: "Duke 2014 Basketball Commitments". Rivals.; "2014 Duke Basketball Commits". Scout.; "ESPN". ESPN.; "Scout.com Team Recruiting Rankings". Scout.; "2014 Team Ranking". Rivals.

== College career ==
Okafor played one season of college basketball for Duke. He was selected as Preseason Player of the Year by CBSSports.com, NBCSports.com, SB Nation, and ESPN analyst Fran Fraschilla. Okafor was a Preseason All-American first team selection by USA Today, CBSSports.com, NBCSports.com, Athlon Sports, Bleacher Report, Sporting News, SB Nation, Sports Illustrated, and the Associated Press. In its preseason top 100 player ranking, Okafor was listed at number 3 by ESPN. For the 2014–15 Atlantic Coast Conference men's basketball season, the conference media selected him as the ACC Preseason Rookie of the Year and as a Preseason All-ACC Team selection. He finished second in the conference Preseason Player of the Year voting to Marcus Paige. He was also listed as a John R. Wooden Award Preseason Top 50 candidate. He was also named to the Oscar Robertson Trophy and Wayman Tisdale Award Watch Lists.

Okafor opened the season as ACC Freshman of the Week on November 17. In his first three games he shot 25-for-30 on his field goal attempts. He was again named ACC Freshman of the Week on November 24 and December 1. He had his first two 20-point performances in the Coaches vs. Cancer Classic with 24 points against Furman on November 26 and 21 against Army on November 30. On December 15 with a 25-point and 20-rebound performance against Elon, Okafor became the first Duke freshman to record 20 rebounds in a game and the second ACC freshman to record 20 points and 20 rebounds in a game, joining Joe Smith. The performance earned Okafor his fourth ACC Rookie of the Week Award and first Wayman Tisdale National Freshman of the Week recognitions. He then scored a season-high 28 points against Boston College on January 3, earning his fifth ACC Rookie of the Week, first ACC Player of the Week, and second Wayman Tisdale National Freshman of the Week recognition the following day. He was again ACC Rookie of the Week on January 12 and 19. He was named to the John R. Wooden Award Midseason Top 25 list on January 14. After sitting out a game due to an ankle injury, Okafor posted a career-high 30 points in an overtime win against Virginia Tech on February 25.

Following the season, Okafor was named Atlantic Coast Conference Men's Basketball Player of the Year by both the ACC coaches and media and ACC Freshman of the year. He was the first freshman to win ACC Player of the Year. He was also a first team All-ACC selection and among the first trio to be selected to the All-ACC Freshman first team (along with Jones and Winslow). He was named USBWA National Freshman of the Year and the 2015 USBWA Freshman All-America Team by the United States Basketball Writers Association (USBWA). Okafor was a unanimous 2015 NCAA Men's Basketball All-American first-team selection by The Sporting News, USBWA, National Association of Basketball Coaches, and Associated Press. He contributed to a national championship with 10 points, including 2 key baskets in the final minutes, in the championship game of the 2015 NCAA Division I men's basketball tournament, despite spending much of the game in foul trouble while defending Frank Kaminsky of Wisconsin. Okafor finished as runner-up to Kaminsky in the John R. Wooden Award voting (3385–3060). On April 9, Okafor declared for the 2015 NBA draft.

== Professional career ==
=== Philadelphia 76ers (2015–2017) ===
==== 2015–16 season ====
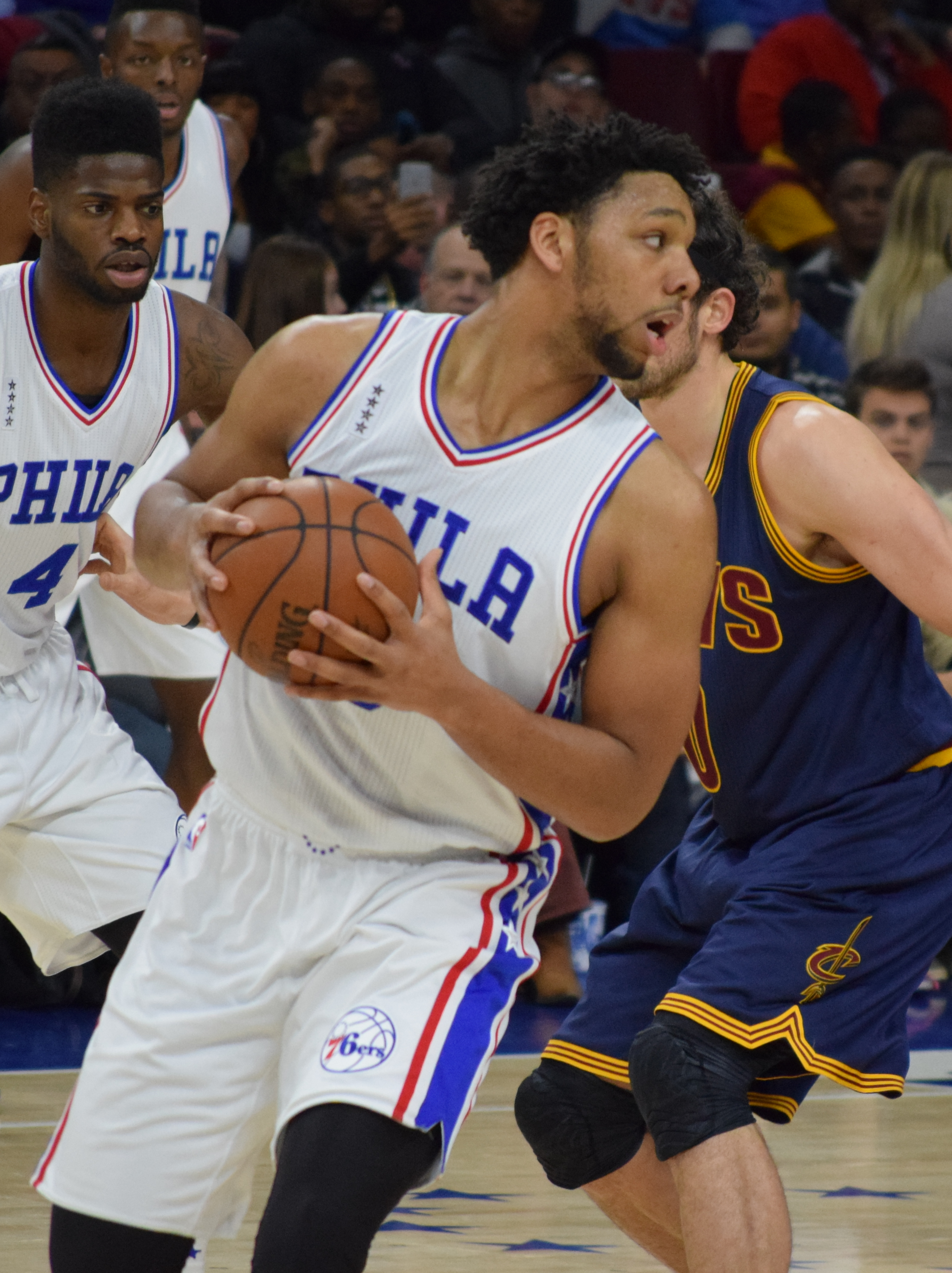
Okafor with the 76ers in 2016

On June 25, 2015, Okafor was selected with the third overall pick in the 2015 NBA draft by the Philadelphia 76ers. After debuting with a 20-point NBA Summer League performance on July 6, Okafor signed a two-year contract with the 76ers on July 7, with team options for two additional seasons. He debuted for the 76ers, logging 26 points, seven rebounds and two blocks, against the Boston Celtics on October 28. On November 9, he posted his first career double-double with 21 points and 15 rebounds against his hometown Chicago Bulls.

After the 76ers got off to an 0–16 start to the season, Okafor was involved in a street fight with taunting individuals on November 25 in Boston. On November 30, with additional reports surfacing that Okafor had been involved in various controversial and dangerous off-the-court situations, the 76ers agreed to a request to assign a security guard to accompany Okafor in public. On December 1, Okafor and the 76ers defeated the Los Angeles Lakers 103–91. The win ended the longest losing streak in the history of major professional sports in the United States (28 games going back to the prior season) and the worst start in NBA history (tied with the 2009–10 New Jersey Nets at 0–18). The next day, video surfaced on TMZ of a second fight in Boston from November. Okafor was subsequently suspended by the 76ers for two games. He returned from suspension against the San Antonio Spurs on December 7, recording 10 points and 4 rebounds off the bench in a 119–68 defeat. On January 27, 2016, he was named to the 2016 NBA All-Star Game weekend Rising Stars Challenge lineup.

In February, the 76ers had Okafor and Nerlens Noel swap positions as Okafor moved from center to power forward. On February 6, he recorded 22 points and a season-high 17 rebounds in a 103–98 win over the Brooklyn Nets. On February 21 against the Dallas Mavericks, Okafor posted a career-high 31 points in a 129–103 loss. On February 28, Okafor posted 26 points against the Orlando Magic, but he endured a shin contusion in a collision with teammate Isaiah Canaan that was only expected to sideline him for a game. As he missed his fifth consecutive game, 76ers head coach Brett Brown noted that Okafor had a CT scan on his knee. On March 11, Okafor was ruled out for the rest of the season after tests revealed that he had sustained a small tear of the meniscus in his right knee.

Okafor finished fifth in the 2016 NBA Rookie of the Year Award voting and earned NBA All-Rookie First Team honors.

==== 2016–17 season ====
After the first week of the 2016–17 NBA season, the 76ers exercised the third-year team option on Okafor's rookie scale contract. Okafor began the season on a 16-minute cap to be played over "smaller segments" and restriction from back-to-back game participation following the re-aggravation of his meniscus injury. His cap was soon raised to 24 minutes. He was cleared to play unrestricted prior to the November 21 contest against the Miami Heat. On January 14, 2017, Okafor, who had not played in the 76ers' previous three games, scored a then season-high 26 points in a 109–93 loss to the Washington Wizards. He was selected to participate in the Rising Stars Challenge event during All-Star weekend. On February 25, 2017, he had a season-high 28 points and grabbed 10 rebounds in a 110–109 loss to the New York Knicks. On March 31, 2017, after missing the previous four games, he was ruled out for the rest of the season with right knee soreness.

==== 2017–18 season ====
On November 1, 2017, Okafor revealed that he would welcome a trade or buyout from the 76ers, after the team decided to not pick up the fourth-year, $6.3 million option on Okafor's rookie deal, after having tried to trade him for some time. Once the 76ers decided not to pick up Okafor's option, it gave him the right to be a free agent following the season. He saw time in only two games in the first 5 weeks of the season. After the 76ers could not reach a trade, the team opted to not reach a contract buyout agreement. It was later revealed that Okafor, along with several others associated with the 76ers, had been the subject of a disinformation campaign by the wife of then-General Manager Bryan Colangelo, using confidential information from the GM to denigrate Okafor and excuse the team's unwillingness to trade him.

=== Brooklyn Nets (2017–2018) ===
On December 7, 2017, Okafor was traded, along with Nik Stauskas and a 2019 second round draft pick, to the Brooklyn Nets in exchange for Trevor Booker. In his debut for the Nets on December 15, 2017 (his 22nd birthday), Okafor had 10 points and four rebounds in 23 minutes in a 120–87 loss to the Toronto Raptors. He had played just 25 minutes all season for the 76ers. Following his debut, the Nets decided to get him back into playing shape before putting him in games again. His next game came on January 3 against the Minnesota Timberwolves, where he scored two points in 11 minutes. Three days later, he had 12 points in 13 minutes in an 87–85 loss to the Boston Celtics. On January 27, he scored a team-high 21 points in a 111–97 loss to the Timberwolves. Following the season, he became an unrestricted free agent.

=== New Orleans Pelicans (2018–2020) ===
On August 9, 2018, Okafor signed with the New Orleans Pelicans. On December 19, he posted a season-high 17 points in 13 minutes against the Milwaukee Bucks. On January 19, the Pelicans announced that Anthony Davis endured an index finger sprain that would sideline him 1–2 weeks. With the increased playing time Okafor set sequential season-high totals in a January 21 105–85 win over the Memphis Grizzlies (season-high 20 points and season-high-tying 10 rebounds), a January 26 126–114 loss to the San Antonio Spurs (24 points and 15 rebounds), and a January 29 121–116 win over the Houston Rockets (27 points) with 12 rebounds. On January 23, he posted a career-high six blocks against the Detroit Pistons. In the last game of the Pelicans' season, Okafor scored 30 points against the Golden State Warriors.

On June 20, 2019, Okafor's team option was picked up by the Pelicans. On October 31, he scored 26 points in a 122–107 win against the Denver Nuggets. On January 13, 2020, he had 25 points and 14 rebounds in a 117–110 overtime win against the Pistons. On January 28, Okafor announced that he would change his number from 8 to honor Kobe Bryant. He would wear the number 9 for the rest of the season.

=== Detroit Pistons (2020–2021) ===
On December 1, 2020, Okafor signed with the Detroit Pistons.

On September 4, 2021, he and Sekou Doumbouya were traded to the Brooklyn Nets in exchange for DeAndre Jordan. Five days later, the Nets waived Okafor.

On September 22, 2021, Okafor signed with the Atlanta Hawks. However, he was waived on October 11.

=== Zhejiang Lions (2022) ===
On February 23, 2022, Okafor signed with the Zhejiang Lions. His G League rights were acquired by the Mexico City Capitanes in September 2022.

=== Mexico City Capitanes (2022–2023) ===
On November 4, 2022, Okafor was named to the opening night roster for the Mexico City Capitanes.

On February 4, 2023, Okafor's rights were traded, along with Shabazz Napier, Bruno Caboclo, and Matt Mooney to the Delaware Blue Coats in exchange for Skylar Mays, Justin Robinson, and Raphiael Putney. However, he never played for Delaware.

=== Casademont Zaragoza (2023) ===
On July 17, 2023, Okafor signed with Casademont Zaragoza of the Liga ACB.

=== Capitanes de Arecibo (2024) ===
On February 7, 2024, Okafor signed with Capitanes de Arecibo.

=== Indiana Pacers / Mad Ants (2024–2025) ===
On October 15, 2024, Okafor signed with the Indiana Pacers, but was waived that day. On October 27, Okafor joined the Indiana Mad Ants where he was selected to 2024 All Showcase team and the 2025 Up Next Game during the 2024–25 season. On February 10, 2025, Okafor signed a 10-day contract with the Pacers.

=== Levanga Hokkaido (2025–present) ===
On July 7, 2025, Okafor signed with Levanga Hokkaido.

== Career statistics ==
Legend
GP	Games played	GS	Games started	MPG	Minutes per game
FG%	Field goal percentage	3P%	3-point field goal percentage	FT%	Free throw percentage
RPG	Rebounds per game	APG	Assists per game	SPG	Steals per game
BPG	Blocks per game	PPG	Points per game	**Bold**	Career high

=== NBA ===
==== Regular season ====
Year	Team	GP	GS	MPG	FG%	3P%	FT%	RPG	APG	SPG	BPG	PPG
2015–16	Philadelphia	53	**48**	**30.0**	.508	.167	.686	**7.0**	**1.2**	**.4**	**1.2**	**17.5**
2016–17	Philadelphia	50	33	22.7	.514	—	.671	4.8	**1.2**	**.4**	1.0	11.8
2017–18	Philadelphia	2	0	12.6	.444	—	.500	4.5	.5	.0	1.0	5.0
2017–18	Brooklyn	26	0	12.6	.566	.250	**.760**	2.9	.4	.1	.6	6.4
2018–19	New Orleans	**59**	24	15.8	.586	.200	.663	4.7	.7	.3	.7	8.2
2019–20	New Orleans	30	9	15.6	**.623**	**.333**	.645	4.2	**1.2**	.2	.7	8.1
2020–21	Detroit	27	2	12.9	.618	.222	.708	2.4	.5	.2	.2	5.4
2024–25	Indiana	1	0	3.4	—	—	—	1.0	1.0	.0	.0	.0
Career		248	116	19.5	.542	.222	.676	4.7	.9	.3	.8	10.3

=== College ===
Year	Team	GP	GS	MPG	FG%	3P%	FT%	RPG	APG	SPG	BPG	PPG
2014–15	Duke	32	32	30.1	.664	—	.510	8.5	1.3	.8	1.4	17.3

== National team career ==
=== US national team ===
In October 2010, he successfully tried out for USA Basketball's 2011–12 USA Developmental National Team. In June 2011, he qualified for the 12-man United States team at the 2011 FIBA Americas Under-16 Championship along with Simeon rivals Parker and Nunn. In the gold medal game, Okafor made all of his field goal attempts, posting 18 points and 14 rebounds. For the tournament, his 46 rebounds over five games ranked him second on the United States team (to Aaron Gordon) and third at the Championships in rebounding.

He was a member of USA Basketball's 12-man Team USA at the 2012 FIBA Under-17 World Cup with Parker and Nunn again. His listed height was 6 feet 11 inches (2.11 m). At a two-game four-team preliminary exhibition tournament in Las Palmas, Canary Islands the week before the championship began, he was named tournament MVP. He was also named the MVP of the 2012 FIBA Under-17 World Cup, for the gold medal-winning United States team. Okafor posted 17 points and eight rebounds in the gold medal game. Over the course of the tournament, he was the second-leading scorer, with 13.6 points per game, and second-leading rebounder for the United States, with 8.2 rebounds per game.

On May 21, 2013, USA Basketball announced the roster of 24 players, including Okafor, who had accepted invitations to the June 14–19, 2013, USA Basketball Men's U19 World Cup team training camp. The camp was used to select the 12-man team for the 2013 FIBA Under-19 World Championship in Czech Republic. Okafor made the final roster that was announced on June 18. The team won the gold medal, and Okafor made the All-Tournament team, along with teammate and tournament MVP Gordon. He led the tournament with 77% field goal percentage, and he was the only player on the All-Tournament Team who would return to high school. However, coaches Billy Donovan and Shaka Smart told him his weak link was his conditioning.

=== Nigeria national team ===
On February 23, 2020, Jahlil Okafor told ESPN's Marc J. Spears that he would represent the Nigeria national team at the 2020 Summer Olympics. He averaged nine points over three games in the group stage.

== Personal life ==
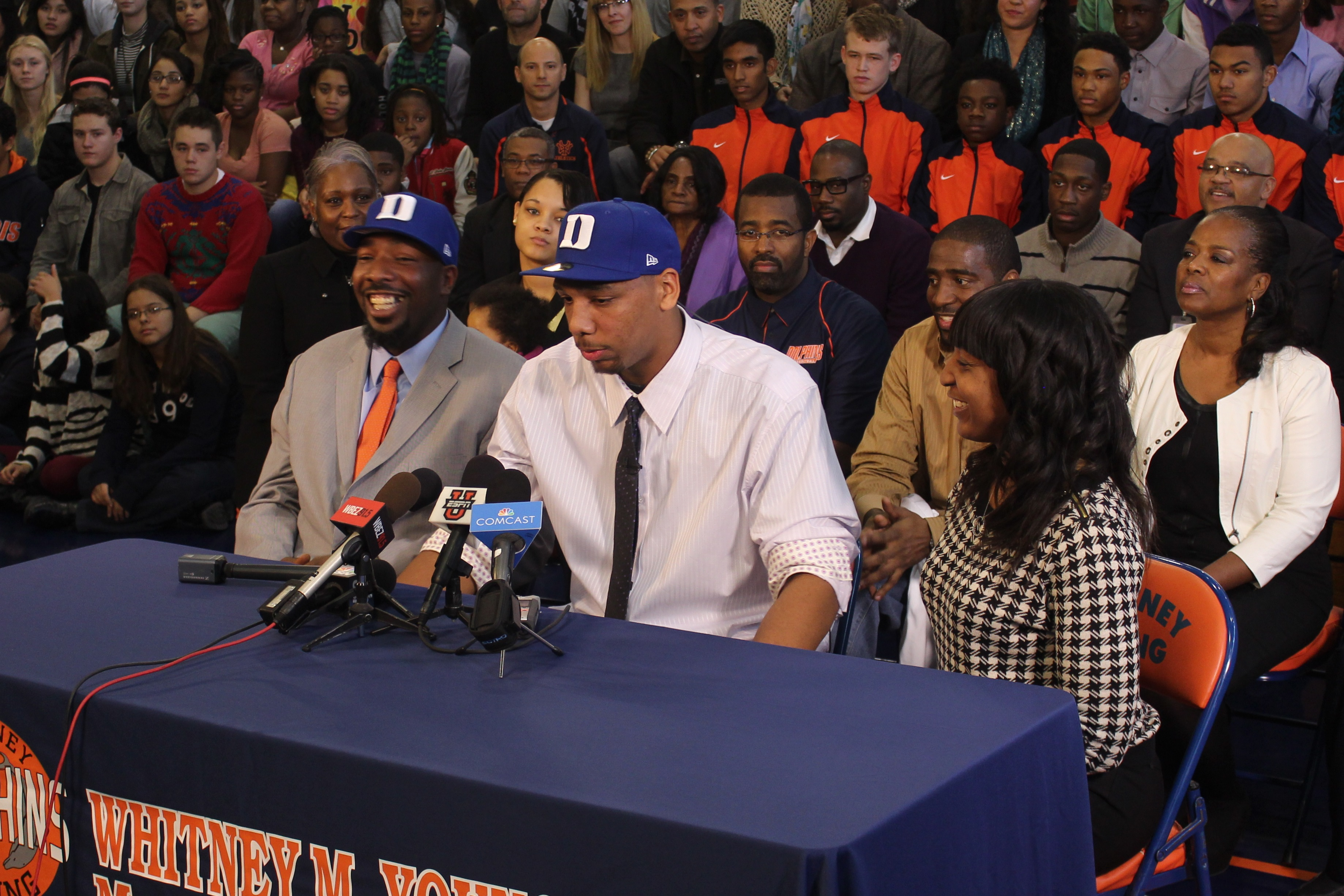
Okafor (center) at his November 2013 verbal commitment press conference with his father Chukwudi and aunt Chinyere Okafor-Conley. Jahlil and Chukwudi are wearing Duke University baseball caps to signify his commitment.

His mother, Dacresha Lanett Benton, died when he was nine years old, leaving him to be raised by his father Chukwudi and aunt Chinyere Okafor-Conley, whom he refers to as his "auntie mom". His father's full name is Chukwudi Obika Okafor. His parents met in Fort Smith, Arkansas, when Chuck played basketball for a local junior college. "My deepest fear is losing someone else close to me," Jahlil told Chicago magazine. "That's something I think about way more than I should."

He has an older sister, Jalen, and two younger brothers named Jamonte and Ashondre. His father has five Chicago-area siblings. His uncle works for the police department in Rosemont, Illinois. His father, who is known as Chuck Okafor, is 6 feet 5 inches (1.96 m) and played power forward for Westark Community College, West Texas A&M University and Carl Albert State College. His parents both had basketball scholarships at Carl Albert State College at the same time. Chuck had been an All-City High School basketball player for Bowen High School.

Okafor plays chess and the saxophone, as well as the tuba. In junior high, he participated in the stage crew for a musical. He is a distant cousin of fellow NBA player Emeka Okafor. He is of Nigerian descent through his paternal grandfather, who moved to the U.S. from Nigeria at the age of 20. Okafor traveled to Nigeria when he was in seventh grade.

Okafor has been practicing hot yoga since the 2016–17 season. He used to be a vegan so that he could prevent his knees from swelling, but he changed his diet when he realized that there was a deficiency in his iron. Okafor has his own chef to make sure that he gets a sufficient amount of protein in his diet. After going to a sleep lab during the 2019 offseason, Okafor was diagnosed with sleep apnea and now uses a CPAP machine, which has improved his quality of sleep.

== See also ==
- List of U.S. high school basketball national player of the year awards
- USWBA National Freshman of the Year
- Atlantic Coast Conference Men’s Basketball Player of the Year

Awards and achievements
Preceded by Jabari Parker	Illinois Mr. Basketball; 2014	Succeeded by Jalen Brunson
