= USA Today All-USA High School Basketball Team =

Award by USA Today

Each year, USA Today, an American newspaper, awards outstanding high school basketball players with a place on its male and female All-USA high school basketball teams. The newspaper names athletes whom it believes to be the best basketball players from high schools around the United States. In addition, one member of each team is named, respectively, the male or female USA Today High School Basketball Player of the Year. The newspaper names two teams, one for male athletes and one for female athletes. The newspaper has named a team every year since 1983. Each year, the newspaper also selects a USA Today High School Boys' Basketball Coach of the Year and a USA Today High School Girls' Basketball Coach of the Year.

== Boys' basketball players and coaches of the year ==
See footnotes

Year	Player	School	Hometown	College	NBA draft
1982–1983	Reggie Williams	Dunbar High School	Baltimore	Georgetown	1st Round – 4th Pick of 1987 (Clippers)
1983–1984	Delray Brooks	Rogers High School	Michigan City, Indiana	Indiana/Providence	Undrafted in the 1988 NBA draft
1984–1985	Danny Ferry	DeMatha Catholic High School	Hyattsville, Maryland	Duke	1st Round – 2nd Pick of 1989 (Clippers)
1985–1986	J. R. Reid	Kempsville High School	Virginia Beach, Virginia	North Carolina	1st Round – 5th Pick of 1989 (Hornets)
1986–1987	Marcus Liberty	King High School	Chicago	Illinois	2nd Round – 42nd Pick of 1990 (Nuggets)
1987–1988	Alonzo Mourning	Indian River High School	Chesapeake, Virginia	Georgetown	1st Round – 2nd Pick of 1992 (Hornets)
1988–1989	Kenny Anderson	Archbishop Molloy High School	Queens, New York	Georgia Tech	1st Round – 2nd Pick of 1991 (Nets)
1989–1990	Damon Bailey	Bedford North Lawrence High School	Bedford, Indiana	Indiana	2nd Round – 44th Pick of 1992 (Pacers)
1990–1991	Chris Webber	Detroit Country Day School	Beverly Hills, Michigan	Michigan	1st Round – 1st Pick of 1993 (Magic)
1991–1992	Jason Kidd	St. Joseph Notre Dame High School	Alameda, California	California	1st Round – 2nd Pick of 1994 (Mavs)
1992–1993	Rasheed Wallace	Simon Gratz High School	Philadelphia	North Carolina	1st Round – 4th Pick of 1995 (Bullets)
1993–1994	Felipe López	Rice High School	New York	St. John's	1st Round – 24th Pick of 1998 (Spurs)
1994–1995	Kevin Garnett	Farragut Career Academy	Chicago	Direct to NBA	1st Round – 5th Pick of 1995 (Timberwolves)
1995–1996	Kobe Bryant	Lower Merion High School	Lower Merion, Pennsylvania	Direct to NBA	1st Round – 13th Pick of 1996 (Hornets)
1996–1997	Tracy McGrady	Mount Zion Christian Academy	Durham, North Carolina	Direct to NBA	1st Round – 9th Pick of 1997 (Raptors)
1997–1998	Al Harrington	St. Patrick High School	Elizabeth, New Jersey	Direct to NBA	1st Round – 25th Pick of 1998 (Pacers)
1998–1999	Donnell Harvey	Randolph Clay High School	Cuthbert, Georgia	Florida	1st Round – 22nd Pick of 2000 (Knicks)
1999–2000	Gerald Wallace	Childersburg High School	Childersburg, Alabama	Alabama	1st Round – 25th Pick of 2001 (Kings)
2000–2001	Dajuan Wagner	Camden High School	Camden, New Jersey	Memphis	1st Round – 6th Pick of 2002 (Cavs)
2001–2002	LeBron James	St. Vincent – St. Mary High School	Akron, Ohio	Direct to NBA	1st Round – 1st Pick of 2003 (Cavs)
2002–2003	LeBron James	St. Vincent – St. Mary High School	Akron, Ohio	Direct to NBA	1st Round – 1st Pick of 2003 (Cavs)
2003–2004	Dwight Howard	Southwest Atlanta Christian Academy	Atlanta	Direct to NBA	1st Round – 1st Pick of 2004 (Magic)
2004–2005	Greg Oden	Lawrence North High School	Indianapolis	Ohio State	1st Round – 1st Pick of 2007 (Blazers)
2005–2006	Greg Oden	Lawrence North High School	Indianapolis	Ohio State	1st Round – 1st Pick of 2007 (Blazers)
2006–2007	Kevin Love	Lake Oswego High School	Lake Oswego, Oregon	UCLA	1st Round – 5th Pick of 2008 (Grizzlies)
2007–2008	Samardo Samuels	Saint Benedict's Preparatory School (Newark, New Jersey)	Trelawny Parish, Jamaica	Louisville	Undrafted in the 2010 NBA draft
2008–2009	Derrick Favors	South Atlanta High School	Atlanta	Georgia Tech	1st Round – 3rd Pick of 2010 (Nets)
2009–2010	Harrison Barnes	Ames High School	Ames, Iowa	North Carolina	1st Round – 7th Pick of 2012 (Warriors)
2010–2011	Austin Rivers	Winter Park High School	Winter Park, Florida	Duke	1st Round – 10th Pick of 2012 (Hornets)
2011–2012	Nerlens Noel	Tilton School (Tilton, New Hampshire)	Everett, Massachusetts	Kentucky	1st Round – 6th Pick of 2013 (Pelicans)
2012–2013	Jabari Parker	Simeon Career Academy	Chicago, Illinois	Duke	1st Round – 2nd Pick of 2014 (Bucks)
2013–2014	Jahlil Okafor	Whitney Young (Chicago)	Chicago	Duke	1st Round – 3rd Pick of 2015 (76ers)
2014–2015	Ben Simmons	Montverde Academy	Melbourne, Australia	LSU	1st Round – 1st Pick of 2016 (76ers)
2015–2016	Lonzo Ball	Chino Hills High School	Chino Hills, California	UCLA	1st Round – 2nd Pick of 2017 (Lakers)
2016–2017	Michael Porter Jr.	Nathan Hale High School (Seattle)	Columbia, Missouri	Missouri	1st Round – 14th Pick of 2017 (Nuggets)
2017–2018	RJ Barrett	Montverde Academy	Toronto	Duke	1st Round – 3rd Pick of 2019 (Knicks)
2018-2019	Sharife Cooper	McEachern High School	Newark, New Jersey	Auburn	2nd Round – 48th Pick of 2021 (Hawks)

=== Boys' Basketball Coach of the Year ===
Year	Coach	School	Hometown
1982–1983	Bob Wade	Dunbar High School	Baltimore
1983–1984	Morgan Wootten	DeMatha Catholic High School	Hyattsville, Maryland
1984–1985	John Wood	Spingarn High School	Washington, D.C.
1985–1986	Stu Vetter	Flint Hill Prep	Oakton, Virginia
1986–1987	Bill Green	Marion High School	Marion, Indiana
1987–1988	John Sarandrea	St. Nicholas of Tolentine	Bronx, New York
1988–1989	Bob Hurley	St. Anthony High School	Jersey City, New Jersey
1989–1990	Landon Cox	King High School	Chicago
1990–1991	Perry Watson	Southwestern High School	Detroit
1991–1992	Pete Pompey	Dunbar High School	Baltimore
1992–1993	Bill Ellerbee	Simon Gratz High School	Philadelphia
1993–1994	Steve Smith	Oak Hill Academy	Mouth of Wilson, Virginia
1994–1995	Bernard Griffith	St. Augustine High School	New Orleans
1995–1996	Bob Hurley	St. Anthony High School	Jersey City, New Jersey
1996–1997	Wayne McClain	Manual High School	Peoria, Illinois
1997–1998	Stu Vetter	Saint John's Catholic Prep	Frederick, Maryland
1998–1999	Steve Smith	Oak Hill Academy	Mouth of Wilson, Virginia
1999–2000	Russell Otis	Dominguez High School	Compton, California
2000–2001	Ronnie Courtney	Willowridge High School	Sugar Land, Texas
2001–2002	Leonard Bishop	Lincoln High School	Dallas
2002–2003	Dru Joyce II	St. Vincent – St. Mary High School	Akron, Ohio
2003–2004	Steve Smith	Oak Hill Academy	Mouth of Wilson, Virginia
2004–2005	Dan Bazzani	Niagara Falls High School	Niagara Falls, New York
2005–2006	Jack Keefer	Lawrence North High School	Indianapolis
2006–2007	Kevin Boyle	St. Patrick High School	Elizabeth, New Jersey
2007–2008	Bob Hurley	St. Anthony High School	Jersey City, New Jersey
2008–2009	J.R. Holmes	Bloomington South High School	Bloomington, Indiana
2009–2010	Vance Downs	Ames High School	Ames, Iowa
2010–2011	Bob Hurley	St. Anthony High School	Jersey City, New Jersey
2011–2012	Steve Smith	Oak Hill Academy	Mouth of Wilson, Virginia

== Girls' Basketball Players and Coaches of the Year ==
See footnotes

Year	Player	School	Hometown	College	WNBA draft
1982–1983	Tina Hutchinson	East St. Louis Lincoln High School	East St. Louis, Illinois	San Diego State	Did not play in WNBA
1983–1984	Chana Perry	Brookhaven High School	Brookhaven, Mississippi	NE Louisiana/San Diego State	Did not play in WNBA
1984–1985	Nora Lewis	Richwoods High School	Peoria, Illinois	Louisiana Tech	Did not play in WNBA
1985–1986	Beth Hunt	Socastee High School	Socastee, South Carolina	Maryland/South Carolina	Did not play in WNBA
1986–1987	Terri Mann	Point Loma High School	San Diego	Western Kentucky/Liberty	Did not play in WNBA
1987–1988	Dawn Staley	Dobbins Tech High School	Philadelphia	Virginia	1st Round – 9th Pick of 1999 (Sting)
1988–1989	Lisa Harrison	Southern High School	Louisville, Kentucky	Tennessee	3rd Round – 34th Pick of 1999 (Mercury)
1989–1990	Lisa Leslie	Morningside High School	Inglewood, California	USC	7th Pick of the 1997 Initial Player Allocation Draft (Sparks)
1990–1991	Tiffany Woosley	Central High School	Shelbyville, Tennessee	Tennessee	Undrafted in the 1997 WNBA draft
1991–1992	Yolanda Watkins	Decatur High School	Decatur, Alabama	Alabama	Did not play in WNBA
1992–1993	La'Keshia Frett	Phoebus High School	Hampton, Virginia	Georgia	4th Round – 40th Pick of 1999 (Sparks)
1993–1994	Nykesha Sales	Bloomfield High School	Bloomfield, Connecticut	Connecticut	2nd Pick of 1999 Expansion Players Allocation Draft (Miracle)
1994–1995	Stephanie White	Seeger High School	West Lebanon, Indiana	Purdue	2nd Round – 21st Pick of 1999 (Sting)
1995–1996	Shea Ralph	Terry Sanford High School	Fayetteville, North Carolina	Connecticut	3rd Round – 40th Pick of 2000 (Starzz)
1996–1997	Semeka Randall	Trinity High School	Garfield Heights, Ohio	Tennessee	2nd Round – 17th Pick of 2001 (Storm)
1997–1998	Tamika Williams	Chaminade-Julienne High School	Dayton, Ohio	Connecticut	1st Round – 6th Pick of 2002 (Lynx)
1998–1999	Nina Smith	Waterloo West High School	Waterloo, Iowa	Wisconsin/Holy Family	Did not play in WNBA
1999–2000	Shereka Wright	Copperas Cove High School	Copperas Cove, Texas	Purdue	1st Round – 13th Pick of 2004 (Shock)
2000–2001	Shyra Ely	Ben Davis High School	Indianapolis	Tennessee	2nd Round – 14th Pick of 2005 (Silver Stars)
2001–2002	Ann Strother	Highlands Ranch High School	Highlands Ranch, Colorado	Connecticut	2nd Round – 15th Pick of 2006 (Comets)
2002–2003	Candace Parker	Central High School	Naperville, Illinois	Tennessee	1st Round – 1st Pick of 2008 (Sparks)
2003–2004	Candace Parker	Central High School	Naperville, Illinois	Tennessee	1st Round – 1st Pick of 2008 (Sparks)
2004–2005	Courtney Paris	Millennium High School	Piedmont, California	Oklahoma	1st Round – 7th Pick of 2009 (Monarchs)
2005–2006	Tina Charles	Christ The King Regional High School	Queens, New York	Connecticut	1st Round – 1st Pick of 2010 (Sun)
2006–2007	Maya Moore	Collins Hill High School	Suwanee, Georgia	Connecticut	1st Round – 1st Pick of 2011 (Lynx)
2007–2008	Elena Delle Donne	Ursuline Academy	Wilmington, Delaware	Connecticut/Delaware	1st Round – 2nd Pick of 2013 (Sky)
2008–2009	Brittney Griner	Nimitz High School	Houston, Texas	Baylor	1st Round – 1st Pick of 2013 (Mercury)
2009–2010	Chiney Ogwumike	Cy-Fair High School	Cypress, Texas	Stanford	1st Round – 1st Pick of 2014 (Sun)
2010–2011	Kaleena Mosqueda-Lewis	Mater Dei High School	Santa Ana, California	Connecticut	1st round – 3rd pick in 2015 (Storm)
2011–2012	Breanna Stewart	Cicero – North Syracuse High School	Syracuse, New York	Connecticut	1st round – 1st pick in 2016 (Storm)
2012–2013	Diamond DeShields	Norcross High School	Norcross, Georgia	North Carolina/Tennessee	1st round – 3rd pick in 2018 (Sky)

=== Girls' Basketball Coach of the Year ===
Year	Coach	School	Hometown
1982–1983	Gus Grason	Towson Catholic High School	Towson, Maryland
1983–1984	Tommy Aldridge	Longview High School	Longview, Texas
1984–1985	Mary Kay Hungate	Richwoods High School	Peoria, Illinois
1985–1986	Jim Holwerda	Brookings High School	Brookings, South Dakota
1986–1987	Reggie Carney	Harold G. Hoffman High School	South Amboy, New Jersey
1987–1988	Art Taneyhill	Altoona High School	Altoona, Pennsylvania
1988–1989	Rick Insell	Central High School	Shelbyville, Tennessee
1989–1990	Sandra Meadows	Duncanville High School	Duncanville, Texas
1990–1991	Rick Insell	Central High School	Shelbyville, Tennessee
1991–1992	Wendell Yoshida	Palos Verdes Peninsula High School	Palos Verdes, California
1992–1993	Vincent Cannizzaro	Christ The King Regional High School	Queens, New York
1993–1994	John Hattrup	Brea Olinda High School	Brea, California
1994–1995	Brad Smith	Oregon City High School	Oregon City, Oregon
1995–1996	Brad Smith	Oregon City High School	Oregon City, Oregon
1996–1997	Brad Smith	Oregon City High School	Oregon City, Oregon
1997–1998	Vincent Cannizzaro	Christ The King Regional High School	Queens, New York
1998–1999	Dave Buthcher	Pickerington High School	Pickerington, Ohio
1999–2000	James Anderson	Narbonne High School	Harbor City, California
2000–2001	James Anderson	Narbonne High School	Harbor City, California
2001–2002	Al Austin	Ribault High School	Jacksonville, Florida
2002–2003	Joe Lombard	Canyon High School	Canyon, Texas
2003–2004	Ed Grezinsky	Murry Bergtraum High School	New York
2004–2005	Bob Mackey	Christ The King Regional High School	Queens, New York
2005–2006	Bob Mackey	Christ The King Regional High School	Queens, New York
2006–2007	Tracey Tipton	Collins Hill High School	Suwanee, Georgia
2007–2008	Brian Harrigan	Sacred Heart Cathedral Prep	San Francisco, California
2008–2009	Stan Benge	Ben Davis High School	Indianapolis
2009–2010	Kevin Kiernan	Mater Dei High School	Santa Ana, California
2010–2011	Anthony Smith	Bolingbrook High School	Bolingbrook, Illinois

== Teams ==
Notes

- **Bold** denotes Boys' Players of the Year, respectively, and ^{‡} denotes high school juniors.
- The "Hometown" column should contain the player's actual hometown, which is not always the location of the player's high school.

=== 1983 Boys' team ===
Coach of the Year: Bob Wade (Dunbar High School, Baltimore)

First Team

Player	Height	School	Hometown	College	NBA Draft
**Reggie Williams**	6 ft 7 in (201 cm)	**Dunbar High School**	Baltimore	Georgetown	1st Round – 4th Pick of 1987 draft (Clippers)
Dwayne Washington	6 ft 2 in (188 cm)	Boys and Girls High School	Brooklyn, New York	Syracuse	1st Round – 13th Pick of 1986 draft (Nets)
Dave Popson	6 ft 10 in (208 cm)	Bishop O'Reilly High School	Kingston, Pennsylvania	North Carolina	4th Round – 88th Pick of 1987 draft (Pistons)
James Blackmon	6 ft 3 in (191 cm)	Marion High School	Marion, Indiana	Kentucky	5th Round – 94th Pick of 1987 draft (Nets)
Antoine Joubert	6 ft 5 in (196 cm)	Southwestern High School	Detroit	Michigan	6th Round – 135th Pick of 1987 draft (Pistons)

=== 1984 Boys' team ===
Coach of the Year: Morgan Wootten (DeMatha Catholic High School, Hyattsville, Maryland)

First Team

Player	Height	School	Hometown	College	NBA draft
**Delray Brooks**	6 ft 4 in (193 cm)	**Rogers High School**	Michigan City, Indiana	Indiana / Providence	Undrafted in 1988 NBA draft
John Williams	6 ft 8 in (203 cm)	Crenshaw High School	Los Angeles	LSU	1st Round – 12th Pick of 1986 draft (Bullets)
Danny Manning	6 ft 11 in (211 cm)	Lawrence High School	Lawrence, Kansas	Kansas	1st Round – 1st Pick of 1988 draft (Clippers)
Kevin Walls	6 ft 2 in (188 cm)	Camden High School	Camden, New Jersey	Louisville/Guilford	Undrafted in 1988 NBA draft
Chris Washburn	6 ft 11 in (211 cm)	Hickory High School	Hickory, North Carolina	North Carolina State	1st Round – 3rd Pick of 1986 draft (Warriors)

=== 1985 Boys' team ===
Coach of the Year: John Wood (Spingarn High School, Washington, D.C.)

First Team

Player	Height	School	Hometown	College	NBA Draft
**Danny Ferry**	6 ft 10 in (208 cm)	**DeMatha Catholic High School**	Hyattsville, Maryland	Duke	1st Round – 2nd Pick of 1989 draft (Clippers)
Tito Horford	7 ft 1 in (216 cm)	Marian Christian High School	Houston, Texas	LSU / Miami (FL)	2nd Round – 39th Pick of 1988 draft (Bucks)
Tony Kimbro	6 ft 8 in (203 cm)	Seneca High School	Louisville, Kentucky	Louisville	Undrafted in 1989 NBA draft
Jeff Lebo	6 ft 3 in (191 cm)	Carlisle High School	Carlisle, Pennsylvania	North Carolina	Undrafted in 1989 NBA draft
Kevin Madden	6 ft 6 in (198 cm)	Robert E. Lee High School	Staunton, Virginia	North Carolina	Undrafted in 1990 NBA draft

=== 1986 Boys' team ===
Coach of the Year: Stu Vetter (Flint Hill Prep, Oakton, Virginia)

First Team

Player	Height	School	Hometown	College	NBA draft
**J.R. Reid**	6 ft 10 in (208 cm)	**Kempsville High School**	Virginia Beach, Virginia	North Carolina	1st Round – 5th Pick of 1989 draft (Hornets)
Rex Chapman	6 ft 5 in (196 cm)	Apollo High School	Owensboro, Kentucky	Kentucky	1st Round – 8th Pick of 1988 draft (Hornets)
Terry Mills	6 ft 10 in (208 cm)	Romulus High School	Romulus, Michigan	Michigan	1st Round – 16th Pick of 1990 draft (Bucks)
Rumeal Robinson	6 ft 2 in (188 cm)	Rindge and Latin High School	Cambridge, Massachusetts	Michigan	1st Round – 10th Pick of 1990 draft (Hawks)
Scott Williams	6 ft 10 in (208 cm)	Wilson High School	Los Angeles	North Carolina	Undrafted in 1990 NBA draft

=== 1987 Boys' team ===
Coach of the Year: Stu Vetter (Flint Hill Prep, Oakton, Virginia)

First Team

Player	Height	School	Hometown	College	NBA draft
**Marcus Liberty**	6 ft 7 in (201 cm)	**King High School**	Chicago	Illinois	2nd Round – 42nd Pick of 1990 draft (Nuggets)
Eric Manuel	6 ft 6 in (198 cm)	Southwest High School	Macon, Georgia	Kentucky / Oklahoma City	Undrafted in 1992 NBA draft
Rodney Monroe	6 ft 3 in (191 cm)	St. Maria Goretti High School	Hagerstown, Maryland	North Carolina State	2nd Round – 30th Pick of 1991 draft (Hawks)
Dennis Scott	6 ft 7 in (201 cm)	Flint Hill Prep	Hagerstown, Maryland	Georgia Tech	1st Round – 4th Pick of 1990 draft (Magic)
LaBradford Smith	6 ft 4 in (193 cm)	Bay City High School	Bay City, Texas	Louisville	1st Round – 19th Pick of 1991 draft (Bullets)

=== 1988 Boys' team ===
Coach of the Year: John Sarandrea (St. Nicholas of Tolentine, Bronx, New York)

First Team

Player	Height	School	Hometown	College	NBA draft
**Alonzo Mourning**	6-10	**Indian River High School**	Chesapeake, Virginia	Georgetown	1st Round – 2nd Pick of 1992 draft (Hornets)
Chris Jackson	6-0	Gulfport High School	Gulfport, Mississippi	LSU	1st Round – 3rd Pick of 1990 draft (Nuggets)
Chris Mills	6-7	Fairfax High School	Los Angeles	Kentucky / Arizona	1st Round – 22nd Pick of 1993 draft (Cavs)
Billy Owens	6-9	Carlisle High School	Carlisle, Pennsylvania	Syracuse	1st Round – 3rd Pick of 1991 draft (Kings)
Kenny Williams	6-10	Fork Union Military Academy	Elizabeth City, North Carolina	Barton CC / Elizabeth City State	2nd Round – 46th Pick of 1990 draft (Pacers)

- Chris Jackson changed his name to Mahmoud Abdul-Rauf in 1993, two years after his conversion to Islam.

=== 1989 Boys' team ===
1st team: Kenny Anderson, Doug Edwards, Allan Houston, Bobby Hurley, Jim Jackson

=== 1990 Boys' team ===
1st team: Damon Bailey, Shawn Bradley, Jamie Brandon, Eric Montross, Ed O'Bannon

=== 1991 Boys' team ===
1st team: Alan Henderson, Juwan Howard, Glenn Robinson, David Vaughn, Chris Webber

=== 1992 Boys' team ===
1st team: Donta Bright, Othella Harrington, Jason Kidd, Rodrick Rhodes, Corliss Williamson

=== 1993 Boys' team ===
1st team: Randy Livingston, Jerry Stackhouse, Jacque Vaughn, Rasheed Wallace, Dontonio Wingfield

=== 1994 Boys' team ===
1st team: Jelani Gardner, Raef LaFrentz, Felipe López, Ricky Price, Jerod Ward

=== 1995 Boys' team ===
1st team: Shareef Abdur-Rahim, Vince Carter, Kevin Garnett, Stephon Marbury, Ron Mercer

=== 1996 Boys' team ===
1st team: Mike Bibby, Kobe Bryant, Ronnie Fields, Winfred Walton, Tim Thomas

=== 1997 Boys' team ===
1st team: Chris Burgess, Baron Davis, Mark Karcher, Tracy McGrady, Lamar Odom

=== 1998 Boys' team ===
1st team: Al Harrington, Rashard Lewis, Quentin Richardson, Stromile Swift, Korleone Young

=== 1999 Boys' team ===
1st team: LaVell Blanchard, Donnell Harvey, Jay Williams, Joseph Forte, DerMarr Johnson.
2nd team: Keith Bogans, Jason Kapono, Brett Nelson, Jason Richardson, Leon Smith
3rd team: Carlos Boozer, Casey Jacobsen, Casey Sanders, Kenny Satterfield, Damien Wilkins

=== 2000 Boys' team ===
1st team: Eddie Griffin, Darius Miles, Zach Randolph, Marcus Taylor, Gerald Wallace

=== 2001 Boys' team ===
1st team: Kwame Brown, Eddy Curry, LeBron James, Kelvin Torbert, Dajuan Wagner

=== 2002 Boys' team ===
Coach of the Year: Leonard Bishop (Lincoln High School, Dallas)

First Team

Player	Height	School	Hometown	College	NBA draft
**LeBron James**^{‡}	6-8	**St. Vincent – St. Mary High School**	Akron, Ohio	Declared for NBA draft	1st Round – 1st Pick of 2003 draft (Cavaliers)
Carmelo Anthony	6-7	Oak Hill Academy	Baltimore	Syracuse	1st Round – 3rd Pick of 2003 draft (Nuggets)
Amar'e Stoudemire	6-10	Cypress Creek High School	Orlando, Florida	Declared for NBA draft	1st Round – 9th Pick of 2002 draft (Suns)
Raymond Felton	6-2	Latta High School	Latta, South Carolina	North Carolina	1st Round – 5th Pick of 2005 draft (Bobcats)
Hassan Adams	6-4	Westchester High School	Los Angeles	Arizona	2nd Round – 54th Pick of 2006 draft (Nets)

Second Team

Player	Height	School	Hometown	College	NBA draft
Chris Bosh	6-10	Lincoln High School	Dallas	Georgia Tech	1st Round – 4th Pick of 2003 draft (Raptors)
Paul Davis	6-11	Rochester High School	Rochester Hills, Michigan	Michigan State	2nd Round – 34th Pick of 2006 draft (Clippers)
Jason Fraser	6-9	Amityville Memorial High School	Amityville, New York	Villanova	Undrafted in 2006
Elijah Ingram	6-1	St. Anthony High School	Jersey City, New Jersey	St. John's	Undrafted in 2006
JJ Redick	6-4	Cave Spring High School	Roanoke, Virginia	Duke	1st Round – 11th Pick of 2006 draft (Magic)

Third Team

Player	Height	School	Hometown	College	NBA draft
DeAngelo Collins	6-10	Inglewood High School	Inglewood, California	Declared for NBA draft	Declared for 2002 NBA draft but was not Drafted
Travis Garrison	6-9	DeMatha Catholic High School	Hyattsville, Maryland	Maryland	Undrafted in 2006
Kendrick Perkins^{‡}	6-11	Clifton J. Ozen High School	Beaumont, Texas	Declared for NBA draft	1st Round – 27th Pick of 2003 draft (Grizzlies)
Anthony Roberson	6-3	Saginaw High School	Saginaw, Michigan	Florida	Undrafted in 2005 NBA draft
Sebastian Telfair^{‡}	5-11	Abraham Lincoln High School	Brooklyn, New York	Declared for NBA draft	1st Round – 13th Pick of 2004 draft (Trail Blazers)

=== 2003 Boys' team ===
1st team
LeBron James, Brian Butch, Luol Deng, Ndudi Ebi, Mustafa Shakur

Coach of the Year
Dru Joyce II

=== 2004 Boys' team ===
1st team
Dwight Howard, Sebastian Telfair, Josh Smith, Shaun Livingston, Al Jefferson

Coach of the Year
Steve Smith

=== 2005 Boys' team ===
1st team
Greg Oden, O. J. Mayo, Monta Ellis, Louis Williams, Josh McRoberts

Coach of the Year
Dan Bazzani

=== 2006 Boys' team ===
Coach of the Year: Jack Keefer (Lawrence North High School, Indianapolis)

First Team

Player	Height	School	Hometown	College	NBA draft
**Greg Oden**	7-0	**Lawrence North High School**	Indianapolis	Ohio State	1st Round – 1st Pick of 2007 draft (Blazers)
O. J. Mayo^{‡}	6-5	North College Hill High School	Cincinnati	USC	1st Round – 3rd Pick of 2008 draft (Timberwolves)
Kevin Durant	6-10	Montrose Christian School	Rockville, Maryland	Texas	1st Round – 2nd Pick of 2007 draft (Sonics)
Tywon Lawson	6-0	Oak Hill Academy	Clinton, Maryland	North Carolina	1st Round – 18th Pick of 2009 draft (Timberwolves)
Spencer Hawes	7-0	Seattle Prep	Seattle	Washington	1st Round – 10th Pick of 2007 draft (Kings)

Second Team

Player	Height	School	Hometown	College	NBA draft
Wayne Ellington	6-5	Episcopal Academy	Merion, Pennsylvania	North Carolina	1st Round – 28th Pick of 2009 draft (Timberwolves)
Brandan Wright	6-9	Brentwood Academy	Nashville, Tennessee	North Carolina	1st Round – 8th Pick of 2007 draft (Bobcats)
Thaddeus Young	6-8	Mitchell High School	Memphis, Tennessee	Georgia Tech	1st Round – 12th Pick of 2007 draft (76ers)
Sherron Collins	5-11	Crane Tech Prep	Chicago	Kansas	Undrafted in the 2010 NBA draft
Paul Harris	6-4	Niagara Falls High School	Niagara Falls, New York	Syracuse	Undrafted in the 2009 NBA draft

Third Team

Player	Height	School	Hometown	College	NBA draft
Michael Beasley^{‡}	6-9	Oak Hill Academy	Washington, D.C.	Kansas State	1st Round – 2nd Pick of 2008 draft (Heat)
Chase Budinger	6-7	La Costa Canyon High School	San Diego	Arizona	2nd Round – 44th Pick of 2009 draft (Pistons)
Darrell Arthur	6-9	South Oak Cliff High School	Dallas	Kansas	1st Round – 27th Pick of 2008 draft (Hornets)
Damion James	6-8	Nacogdoches High School	Nacogdoches, Texas	Texas	1st Round – 24th Pick of 2010 draft (Hawks)
Kevin Love^{‡}	6-10	Lake Oswego High School	Lake Oswego, Oregon	UCLA	1st Round – 5th Pick of 2008 draft (Grizzlies)

=== 2007 Boys' team ===
Coach of the Year: Kevin Boyle (St. Patrick High School, Elizabeth, New Jersey)

First Team

Player	Height	School	Hometown	College	NBA draft
**Kevin Love**	**6-10**	**Lake Oswego High School**	Lake Oswego, Oregon	UCLA	1st Round – 5th Pick of 2008 draft (Grizzlies)
O. J. Mayo	6-5	Huntington High School	Huntington, West Virginia	USC	1st Round – 3rd Pick of 2008 draft (Timberwolves)
Eric Gordon	6-4	North Central High School	Indianapolis	Indiana	1st Round – 7th Pick of 2008 draft (Clippers)
Kyle Singler	6-9	South Medford High School	Medford, Oregon	Duke	2nd Round – 33rd Pick of 2011 draft (Pistons)
Derrick Rose	6-3	Simeon Career Academy	Chicago	Memphis	1st Round – 1st Pick of 2008 draft (Bulls)

Second Team

Player	Height	School	Hometown	College	NBA draft
Michael Beasley	6-9	Notre Dame Prep	Washington, D.C.	Kansas State	1st Round – 2nd Pick of 2008 draft (Heat)
Donte Greene	6-10	Towson Catholic High School	Towson, Maryland	Syracuse	1st Round – 28th Pick of 2008 draft (Grizzlies)
Patrick Patterson	6-8	Huntington High School	Huntington, West Virginia	Kentucky	1st Round – 14th Pick of 2010 draft (Rockets)
Jerryd Bayless	6-3	St. Mary's High School	Phoenix, Arizona	Arizona	1st Round – 11th Pick of 2008 draft (Pacers)
Kosta Koufos	7-0	GlenOak High School	Canton, Ohio	Ohio State	1st Round – 23rd Pick of 2008 draft (Jazz)

Third Team

Player	Height	School	Hometown	College	NBA draft
Anthony Randolph	6-10	Woodrow Wilson High School	Dallas	LSU	1st Round – 14th Pick of 2008 draft (Warriors)
Nolan Smith	6-3	Oak Hill Academy	Washington, D.C.	Duke	1st Round – 21st Pick of 2011 draft (Blazers)
Corey Fisher	6-0	St. Patrick High School	Elizabeth, New Jersey	Villanova	Undrafted in the 2011 NBA draft
Nick Calathes	6-4	Lake Howell High School	Winter Park, Florida	Florida	2nd Round – 45th Pick of 2009 draft (Timberwolves)
Austin Freeman	6-4	DeMatha Catholic High School	Hyattsville, Maryland	Georgetown	Undrafted in the 2011 NBA draft

=== 2008 Boys' team ===
Coach of the Year: Bob Hurley (St. Anthony High School, Jersey City, New Jersey)

First Team

Player	Height	School	Hometown	College	NBA draft
**Samardo Samuels**	**6-9**	**St. Benedict's Prep**	Trelawny Parish, Jamaica	Louisville	Undrafted in the 2010 NBA draft
Jrue Holiday	6-4	Campbell Hall School	North Hollywood, California	UCLA	1st Round – 17th Pick of 2009 draft (76ers)
Brandon Jennings	6-2	Oak Hill Academy	Compton, California	Did Not Attend College *	1st Round – 10th Pick of 2009 draft (Bucks)
B.J. Mullens	7-1	Canal Winchester High School	Canal Winchester, Ohio	Ohio State	1st Round – 24th Pick of 2009 draft (Mavs)
Lance Stephenson^{‡}	6-6	Lincoln High School	Brooklyn, New York	Cincinnati	2nd Round – 40th Pick of 2010 draft (Pacers)

Second Team

Player	Height	School	Hometown	College	NBA draft
Al-Farouq Aminu	6-9	Norcross High School	Norcross, Georgia	Wake Forest	1st Round – 8th Pick of 2010 draft (Clippers)
Tyreke Evans	6-6	American Christian School	Aston, Pennsylvania	Memphis	1st Round – 5th Pick of 2009 draft (Kings)
Renardo Sidney^{‡}	6-9	Fairfax High School	Los Angeles	Mississippi State	Undrafted in 2012
DeMar DeRozan	6-6	Compton High School	Compton, California	USC	1st Round – 9th Pick of 2009 draft (Raptors)
Mike Rosario	6-2	St. Anthony High School	Jersey City, New Jersey	Rutgers/Florida	Undrafted in 2013

Third Team

Player	Height	School	Hometown	College	NBA draft
Scotty Hopson	6-5	University Heights Academy	Hopkinsville, Kentucky	Tennessee	Undrafted in 2011
Greg Monroe	6-10	Helen Cox High School	Harvey, Louisiana	Georgetown	1st Round – 7th Pick of 2009 draft (Pistons)
Willie Warren	6-4	North Crowley High School	Fort Worth, Texas	Oklahoma	2nd Round – 54th Pick of 2010 draft (Clippers)
Michael Dunigan	6-10	Farragut Career Academy	Chicago	Oregon	Undrafted in 2011
Tyler Zeller	6-10	Washington High School	Washington, Indiana	North Carolina	1st Round – 17th Pick of 2012 draft (Mavericks)

- Jennings did not attend any college, as he chose to sign a professional contract with Lottomatica Roma of the Italian Serie A after finishing high school. He was eligible to enter the NBA Draft one year after graduating from high school, and was selected with the 10th overall pick of the 2009 NBA draft by the Bucks.
- Dunigan signed a 3-year contract with Hapoel Migdal of the Israeli Basketball Super League shortly before the start of the 2010–11 college season. Currently, Dunigan is on BC Kalev/Cramo basketball team in the Estonian Estonian Korvapalli Meistriliiga League (also known as EMKL). He was eligible to enter the 2011 NBA draft, but went undrafted.

=== 2009 Boys' team ===
Coach of the Year: J.R. Holmes (Bloomington South High School, Bloomington, Indiana)

First Team

Player	Height	School	Hometown	College	NBA draft
**Derrick Favors**	**6-9**	**South Atlanta High School**	Atlanta	Georgia Tech	1st Round – 3rd Pick of 2010 draft (Nets)
Avery Bradley	6-3	Findlay College Prep	Tacoma, Washington	Texas	1st Round – 19th Pick of 2010 draft (Celtics)
DeMarcus Cousins	6-10	LeFlore High School	Mobile, Alabama	Kentucky	1st Round – 5th Pick of 2010 draft (Kings)
Renardo Sidney	6-9	Fairfax High School	Los Angeles	Mississippi State	Undrafted in 2012
John Wall	6-3	Word of God Christian Academy	Raleigh, North Carolina	Kentucky	1st Round – 1st Pick of 2010 draft (Wizards)

Second Team

Player	Height	School	Hometown	College	NBA draft
Lance Stephenson	6-6	Lincoln High School	Brooklyn, New York	Cincinnati	2nd Round – 40th Pick of 2010 draft (Pacers)
Xavier Henry	6-6	Putnam City High School	Oklahoma City	Kansas	1st Round – 12th Pick of 2010 draft (Grizzlies)
John Henson	6-10	Sickles High School	Tampa, Florida	North Carolina	1st Round – 14th Pick of 2012 draft (Bucks)
Mouphtaou Yarou	6-9	Montrose Christian School	Natitingou, Benin	Villanova	Undrafted in 2013
Keith Gallon	6-9	Oak Hill Academy	Vallejo, California	Oklahoma	2nd Round – 47th Pick of 2010 draft (Bucks)

Third Team

Player	Height	School	Hometown	College	NBA draft
Peyton Siva	6-0	Franklin High School	Seattle	Louisville	2nd Round – 56th Pick of 2013 draft (Pistons)
Brandon Knight^{‡}	6-3	Pine Crest School	Fort Lauderdale, Florida	Kentucky	1st Round – 8th Pick of 2011 draft (Pistons)
Kawhi Leonard	6-7	King High School	Riverside, California	San Diego State	1st Round – 15th Pick of 2011 draft (Pacers)
Ryan Kelly	6-10	Ravenscroft School	Raleigh, North Carolina	Duke	2nd Round – 48th Pick of 2013 draft (Lakers)
Daniel Orton	6-10	Bishop McGuinness High School	Oklahoma City	Kentucky	1st Round – 29th Pick of 2010 draft (Magic)

=== 2010 Boys' team ===
Coach of the Year: Vance Downs (Ames High School, Ames, Iowa)

First Team

Player	Height	School	Hometown	College	NBA draft
**Harrison Barnes**	**6-8**	**Ames High School**	Ames, Iowa	North Carolina	1st Round – 7th Pick of 2012 draft (Warriors)
Jared Sullinger	6-9	Northland High School	Columbus, Ohio	Ohio State	1st Round – 21st Pick of 2012 draft (Celtics)
Kyrie Irving	6-3	St. Patrick High School	Elizabeth, New Jersey	Duke	1st Round – 1st Pick of 2011 draft (Cavs)
Brandon Knight	6-4	Pine Crest School	Fort Lauderdale, Florida	Kentucky	1st Round – 8th Pick of 2011 draft (Pistons)
Tobias Harris	6-8	Half Hollow Hills West High School	Dix Hills, New York	Tennessee	1st Round – 19th Pick of 2011 draft (Bobcats)

Second Team

Player	Height	School	Hometown	College	NBA draft
Josh Selby	6-3	Lake Clifton High School	Baltimore	Kansas	2nd Round – 49th Pick of 2011 draft (Grizzlies)
Cory Joseph	6-3	Findlay College Prep	Pickering, ON, Canada	Texas	1st Round – 29th Pick of 2011 draft (Spurs)
Michael Gilchrist^{‡}	6-7	St. Patrick High School	Elizabeth, New Jersey	Kentucky	1st Round – 2nd Pick of 2012 draft (Bobcats)
Doron Lamb	6-4	Oak Hill Academy	Queens, New York	Kentucky	2nd Round – 42nd Pick of 2012 draft (Bucks)
Terrence Jones	6-9	Jefferson High School	Portland, Oregon	Kentucky	1st Round – 18th Pick of 2012 draft (Rockets)

Third Team

Player	Height	School	Hometown	College	NBA draft
Austin Rivers^{‡}	6-4	Winter Park High School	Winter Park, Florida	Duke	1st Round – 10th Pick of 2012 draft (Hornets)
Josh Smith	6-10	Kentwood High School	Kent, Washington	UCLA/Georgetown	Undrafted in 2015
Deshaun Thomas	6-7	Bishop Luers High School	Fort Wayne, Indiana	Ohio State	2nd Round – 58th Pick of 2013 draft (Spurs)
Kendall Marshall	6-4	Bishop O'Connell High School	Arlington, Virginia	North Carolina	1st Round – 13th Pick of 2012 draft (Suns)
James Bell	6-5	Montverde Academy	Orlando, Florida	Villanova	Undrafted in 2014

=== 2011 Boys' team ===
Coach of the Year: Bob Hurley (St. Anthony High School, Jersey City, New Jersey)

First Team

Player	Height	School	Hometown	College	NBA draft
**Austin Rivers**	**6-4**	**Winter Park High School**	Winter Park, Florida	Duke	1st Round – 10th Pick of 2012 draft (Hornets)
Michael Gilchrist	6-7	St. Patrick High School	Elizabeth, New Jersey	Kentucky	1st Round – 2nd Pick of 2012 draft (Bobcats)
Anthony Davis	6-9	Perspective Charter	Chicago	Kentucky	1st Round – 1st Pick of 2012 draft (Hornets)
Bradley Beal	6-5	Chaminade School	St. Louis, Missouri	Florida	1st Round – 3rd Pick of 2012 draft (Wizards)
James Michael McAdoo	6-8	Norfolk Christian Schools	Norfolk, Virginia	North Carolina	Undrafted in 2014

Second Team

Player	Height	School	Hometown	College	NBA draft
Khem Birch	6-9	Notre Dame Prep	Montreal, Quebec, Canada	Pittsburgh/UNLV	Undrafted in 2014
Perry Ellis^{‡}	6-8	Wichita Heights High School	Wichita, Kansas	Kansas	Undrafted in 2016
Myles Mack	5-9	St. Anthony High School	Jersey City, New Jersey	Rutgers	Undrafted in 2015
Shabazz Muhammad^{‡}	6-6	Bishop Gorman High School	Las Vegas, Nevada	UCLA	1st Round – 14th Pick of 2013 draft (Jazz, traded to Timberwolves)
Cody Zeller	6-11	Washington High School	Washington, Indiana	Indiana	1st Round – 4th Pick of 2013 draft (Bobcats)

Third Team

Player	Height	School	Hometown	College	NBA draft
Johnny O'Bryant	6-10	East Side High School	Cleveland, Mississippi	LSU	2nd round – 36th pick of 2014 draft (Milwaukee Bucks)
Kyle Wiltjer	6-10	Jesuit High School	Portland, Oregon	Kentucky/Gonzaga	Undrafted in 2016
Tyrone Johnson	6-3	Montrose Christian School	Rockville, Maryland	Villanova/South Carolina	Undrafted in 2015
Shannon Scott	6-2	Alpharetta High School	Alpharetta, Georgia	Ohio State	Undrafted in 2015
Marquis Teague	6-1	Pike High School	Indianapolis	Kentucky	1st Round – 29th Pick of 2012 draft (Bulls)
Dorian Finney-Smith	6-8	Norcom High School	Portsmouth, Virginia	Virginia Tech/Florida	Undrafted in 2016 draft

=== 2012 Boys' team ===
Coach of the Year: Steve Smith (Oak Hill Academy, Mouth of Wilson, Virginia)

First Team

Player	Height	School	Hometown	College	NBA draft
Kyle Anderson	6'8"	St. Anthony High School	Jersey City, New Jersey	**UCLA**	1st round – 30th pick of the 2014 draft (San Antonio Spurs)
Marcus Smart	6'4"	Edward S. Marcus High School	Flower Mound, Texas	**Oklahoma State**	1st round – 6th pick of the 2014 draft (Boston Celtics)
Jabari Parker^{‡}	6'8"	Simeon Career Academy	Chicago	**Duke**	1st round – 2nd pick of the 2014 draft (Milwaukee Bucks)
Shabazz Muhammad	6'6"	Bishop Gorman High School	Las Vegas, Nevada	**UCLA**	1st Round – 14th Pick of 2013 draft (Jazz, traded to Timberwolves)
Nerlens Noel	6'10"	Tilton School	Everett, Massachusetts	**Kentucky**	1st Round – 6th Pick of 2013 draft (Pelicans, traded to Sixers)

Second Team

Player	Height	School	Hometown	College	NBA draft
Tyler Lewis	5'11"	Oak Hill Academy	Statesville, North Carolina	**NC State/Butler**	Undrafted in 2017
Kasey Hill^{‡}	6'1"	Montverde Academy	Eustis, Florida	**Florida**	Undrafted in 2017
Amile Jefferson	6'9"	Friends' Central School	Wynnewood, Pennsylvania	**Duke**	Undrafted in 2017
Anthony Bennett	6'8"	Findlay Prep	Brampton, ON	**UNLV**	1st round – 1st pick of 2013 Draft (Cavaliers)
Perry Ellis	6'8"	Wichita Heights High School	Wichita, Kansas	**Kansas**	Undrafted in 2016

Third Team

Player	Height	School	Hometown	College	NBA draft
Rodney Purvis	6'4"	Upper Room Christian Academy	Raleigh, North Carolina	**NC State/Connecticut**	Undrafted in 2017
Katin Reinhardt	6'5"	Mater Dei High School	Santa Ana, California	**UNLV/USC/Marquette**	Undrafted in 2017
Brandon Ashley	6'8"	Findlay Prep	Oakland, California	**Arizona**	Undrafted in 2015
Alex Poythress	6'8"	Northeast High School	Clarksville, Tennessee	**Kentucky**	Undrafted in 2016
Isaiah Austin	7'0"	Grace Preparatory Academy	Arlington, Texas	**Baylor**	Undrafted

- Austin ended his college basketball career in 2014 after being diagnosed with Marfan syndrome. After receiving medical clearance to return to play in late 2016, he began playing professionally overseas in 2017.

=== 2013 Boys' team ===
Coach of the year: Kevin Boyle, Montverde (Florida) Academy

First team

Player	Position	Height	School	Hometown	College	NBA draft
Andrew Wiggins	G/F	6'8"	Huntington Prep	Thornhill, Ontario	**Kansas**	1st round – 1st pick in 2014 (Minnesota Timberwolves)
Jabari Parker	F	6'8"	Simeon	Chicago, Illinois	**Duke**	1st round – 2nd pick in 2014 (Milwaukee Bucks)
Aaron Harrison	G	6'5"	Travis	Richmond, Texas	**Kentucky**	Undrafted in 2015
Julius Randle	F	6'9"	Prestonwood Christian	Plano, Texas	**Kentucky**	1st round – 7th pick in 2014 (Los Angeles Lakers)
Jahlil Okafor‡	C	6'10"	Whitney Young	Chicago, Illinois	**Duke**	1st Round – 3rd pick in 2015 (Philadelphia 76ers)

Second team

Player	Position	Height	School	Hometown	College	NBA draft
Aaron Gordon	F	6'8"	Archbishop Mitty	San Jose, California	**Arizona**	1st round – 4th pick in 2014 (Orlando Magic)
Andrew Harrison	G	6'5"	Travis	Richmond, Texas	**Kentucky**	2nd round – 44th pick in 2015 (Phoenix Suns)
Dakari Johnson	C	6'10"	Montverde Academy	Brooklyn, New York	**Kentucky**	2nd round – 48th pick in 2015 (Oklahoma City Thunder)
Kasey Hill	G	6'0"	Montverde Academy	Eustis, Florida	**Florida**	Undrafted in 2017
Nigel Williams-Goss	G	6'3"	Findlay Prep	Happy Valley, Oregon	**Washington/Gonzaga**	2nd round – 55th pick in 2017 (Utah Jazz)

Third team

Player	Position	Height	School	Hometown	College	NBA draft
Joel Embiid	C	7'0"	The Rock School	Yaoundé, Cameroon	**Kansas**	1st round – 3rd pick in 2014 (Philadelphia 76ers)
Bobby Portis Jr.	F	6'9"	Hall	Little Rock, Arkansas	**Arkansas**	1st round – 22nd pick in 2015 (Chicago Bulls)
Marcus Lee	F	6'9"	Deer Valley	Antioch, California	**Kentucky/California**	Automatically eligible for the 2018 draft
Tyler Ennis	G	6'0"	St. Benedict's Prep	Toronto, Ontario	**Syracuse**	1st round – 18th pick in 2014 (Phoenix Suns)
James Young	G	6'6"	Rochester	Rochester Hills, Michigan	**Kentucky**	1st round – 17th pick in 2014 (Boston Celtics)

=== 2014 Boys' team ===
Coach of the year: Sharman White, Miller Grove, Lithonia, Ga.

First team

Player	Position	Height	School	Hometown	College	NBA draft
Jahlil Okafor	C	6'11"	Whitney Young	Chicago, Illinois	**Duke**	1st round – 3rd pick in 2015 (Philadelphia 76ers)
Cliff Alexander	F	6'8"	Curie	Chicago, Illinois	**Kansas**	Undrafted in 2015
Kelly Oubre	F	6'7"	Findlay Prep	Richmond, Texas	**Kansas**	1st round – 15th pick in 2015 (Atlanta Hawks)
Emmanuel Mudiay	G	6'5"	Prime Prep	Arlington, Texas	**None**	1st round – 7th pick in 2015 (Denver Nuggets)
Stanley Johnson	F	6'6"	Mater Dei	Santa Ana, California	**Arizona**	1st round – 8th pick in 2015 (Detroit Pistons)

- Mudiay chose to sign with the Guangdong Southern Tigers of the Chinese Basketball Association instead of accepting a scholarship offer from SMU. He was drafted after one season in China.

Second team

Player	Position	Height	School	Hometown	College	NBA draft
D'Angelo Russell	G	6'4"	Montverde Academy	Louisville, Kentucky	**Ohio State**	1st round – 2nd pick in 2015 (Los Angeles Lakers)
Justin Jackson	F	6'8"	Homeschool Christian Youth Association	Houston, Texas	**North Carolina**	1st round – 15th pick in 2017 (Portland Trail Blazers; traded to Sacramento Kings)
Tyus Jones	G	6'2"	Apple Valley	Apple Valley, Minnesota	**Duke**	1st round – 24th pick in 2015 (Cleveland Cavaliers)
Trey Lyles	G	6'5"	Arsenal Tech	Regina, Saskatchewan	**Kentucky**	1st round – 7th pick in 2015 (Denver Nuggets)
Karl-Anthony Towns	C	7'1"	St. Joseph	Piscataway, New Jersey	**Kentucky**	1st round – 1st pick in 2015 (Minnesota Timberwolves)

Third team

Player	Position	Height	School	Hometown	College	NBA draft
Devin Booker	G	6'6"	Moss Point	Moss Point, Mississippi	**Kentucky**	1st round – 13th pick in 2015 (Phoenix Suns)
Malik Newman‡	G	6'3"	Callaway	Jackson, Mississippi	**Mississippi State/Kansas**	Has not yet declared for the NBA draft
Theo Pinson	F	6'5"	Wesleyan Christian	Greensboro, North Carolina	**North Carolina**	Automatically eligible for the 2018 draft
Ben Simmons‡	F	6'8"	Montverde Academy	Melbourne, Australia	**LSU**	1st round – 1st pick in 2016 (Philadelphia 76ers)
Tyler Ulis	G	5'8"	Marian Catholic	Lima, Ohio	**Kentucky**	2nd round – 34th pick in 2016 (Phoenix Suns)

=== 2015 Boys' team ===
Coach of the year: Melvin Randall, Blanche Ely, Pompano Beach, Florida

First team

Player	Position	Height	School	Hometown	College	NBA draft
Ben Simmons	F	6'8"	Montverde Academy	Melbourne, Australia	**LSU**	1st round – 1st pick in 2016 (Philadelphia 76ers)
Isaiah Briscoe	G	6'3"	Roselle Catholic	Newark, New Jersey	**Kentucky**	Undrafted in 2017
Malik Newman	G	6'3"	Callaway	Jackson, Mississippi	**Mississippi State/Kansas**	Has not yet declared for the NBA draft
Harry Giles‡	F	6'10"	Wesleyan Christian	Winston-Salem, North Carolina	**Duke**	1st round – 20th pick in 2017 (Portland Trail Blazers)
Jaylen Brown	F	6'7"	Wheeler	Alpharetta, Georgia	**California**	1st round – 3rd pick in 2016 (Boston Celtics)

Second team

Player	Position	Height	School	Hometown	College	NBA draft
Allonzo Trier	G	6'5"	Findlay Prep	Seattle, Washington	**Arizona**	Declared for the 2018 draft
Cheick Diallo	F	6'9"	Our Savior New American	Kayes, Mali	**Kansas**	2nd round – 33rd pick in 2016 (Los Angeles Clippers; traded to New Orleans Pelicans)
Diamond Stone	C	6'10"	Dominican	Milwaukee, Wisconsin	**Maryland**	2nd round – 40th pick in 2016 (New Orleans Pelicans)
Ivan Rabb	C	6'11"	Bishop O'Dowd	Oakland, California	**California**	2nd round – 35th pick in 2017 (Orlando Magic)
Dwayne Bacon	G	6'6"	Oak Hill Academy	Lakeland, Florida	**Florida State**	2nd round – 40th pick in 2017 (New Orleans Pelicans)

Third team

Player	Position	Height	School	Hometown	College	NBA draft
Chase Jeter	C	6'10"	Bishop Gorman	Las Vegas, Nevada	**Duke/Arizona**	Has not yet declared for the NBA draft
Carlton Bragg	F	6'9"	Villa Angela–St. Joseph	Cleveland, Ohio	**Kansas/Arizona State**	Has not yet declared for the NBA draft
Henry Ellenson	F	6'10"	Rice Lake	Rice Lake, Wisconsin	**Marquette**	1st round – 18th pick in 2016 (Detroit Pistons)
Antonio Blakeney	G	6'4"	Oak Ridge	Orlando, Florida	**LSU**	Undrafted in 2017
Jalen Brunson	G	6'1"	Stevenson	Lincolnshire, Illinois	**Villanova**	Declared for the 2018 draft

=== 2016 Boys' team ===
Coach of the year: Steve Baik, Chino Hills, California

First team

Player	Position	Height	School	Hometown	College	NBA draft
**Lonzo Ball**	G	6'6"	Chino Hills	Chino Hills, California	**UCLA**	1st round – 2nd pick in 2017 (Los Angeles Lakers)
De'Aaron Fox	G	6'4"	Cypress Lake	Katy, Texas	**Kentucky**	1st round – 5th pick in 2017 (Sacramento Kings)
Deandre Ayton‡	C	7'1"	Hillcrest Prep	Nassau, Bahamas	**Arizona**	1st round – 1st pick in 2018 (Phoenix Suns)
Josh Jackson	F	6'7"	Prolific Prep	Southfield, Michigan	**Kansas**	1st round – 4th pick in 2017 (Phoenix Suns)
Jayson Tatum	F	6'7"	Chaminade	St. Louis, Missouri	**Duke**	1st round – 3rd pick in 2017 (Boston Celtics)

Second team

Player	Position	Height	School	Hometown	College	NBA draft
Miles Bridges	F	6'7"	Huntington Prep	Flint, Michigan	**Michigan State**	1st round – 12th pick in 2018 (Charlotte Hornets)
Markelle Fultz	G	6'4"	DeMatha	Upper Marlboro, Maryland	**Washington**	1st round – 1st pick in 2017 (Philadelphia 76ers)
Alterique Gilbert	G	6'0"	Miller Grove	Richmond, Virginia	**Connecticut**	Has not yet declared for the NBA draft
T. J. Leaf	F	6'9"	Foothills Christian	Lakeside, California	**UCLA**	1st round – 18th pick in 2017 (Indiana Pacers)
Malik Monk	G	6'3"	Bentonville	Lepanto, Arkansas	**Kentucky**	1st round – 11th pick in 2017 (Charlotte Hornets)

Third team

Player	Position	Height	School	Hometown	College	NBA draft
Bam Adebayo	F	6'9"	High Point Christian	Little Washington, North Carolina	**Kentucky**	1st round – 14th pick in 2017 (Miami Heat)
Mustapha Heron	G	6'4"	Sacred Heart	Waterbury, Connecticut	**Auburn/St. John's**	Withdrew from the 2018 draft
Frank Jackson	G	6'4"	Lone Peak	Alpine, Utah	**Duke**	2nd round – 31st pick in 2017 (Charlotte Hornets; traded to New Orleans Pelicans)
Josh Langford	G	6'5"	Madison Academy	Huntsville, Alabama	**Michigan State**	Has not yet declared for the NBA draft
Michael Porter Jr.‡	F	6'9"	Father Tolton	Columbia, Missouri	**Missouri**	1st round – 14th pick in 2018 (Denver Nuggets)

=== 2017 Boys' team ===
Coach of the year: Jack Doss, Mae Jemison, Huntsville, Alabama

First team

Player	Position	Height	School	Hometown	College	NBA draft
**Michael Porter Jr.**	F	6'10"	Nathan Hale	Columbia, Missouri	**Missouri**	1st round – 14th pick in 2018 (Denver Nuggets)
Marvin Bagley III	G	6'4"	Cypress Lake	Katy, Texas	**Duke**	1st round – 2nd pick in 2018 (Sacramento Kings)
Trevon Duval	G	6'3"	IMG Academy	New Castle, Delaware	**Duke**	Undrafted
Deandre Ayton	C	7'1"	Prolific Prep	Nassau, Bahamas	**Arizona**	1st round – 1st pick in 2018 (Phoenix Suns)
Zion Williamson‡	F	6'7"	Spartanburg Day School	Spartanburg, SC	**Duke**	1st round – 1st pick in 2019 (New Orleans Pelicans)

Second team

Player	Position	Height	School	Hometown	College	NBA draft
Wendell Carter Jr.	F	6'10"	Pace Academy	Atlanta, Georgia	**Duke**	1st round – 7th pick in 2018 (Chicago Bulls)
Collin Sexton	G	6'3"	Pebblebrook	Mableton, Georgia	**Alabama**	1st round – 8th pick in 2018 (Cleveland Cavaliers)
P. J. Washington	F	6'8"	Findlay Prep	Dallas, Texas	**Kentucky**	1st round – 12th pick in 2019 (Charlotte Hornets)
Brian Bowen	F	6'7"	La Lumiere	Saginaw, Michigan	**South Carolina**	Withdrew from the 2018 draft
Trae Young	G	6'2"	Norman North	Norman, Oklahoma	**Oklahoma**	1st round – 5th pick in 2018 (Dallas Mavericks)

- Bowen signed to play with Louisville, but was suspended before what would have been his freshman season because of an FBI investigation that raised serious questions about his NCAA eligibility, and never played for the school. He enrolled at South Carolina in January 2018, but never played for that school due to NCAA transfer rules. In a later phase of the FBI investigation, further eligibility questions arose, and he declared for the 2018 draft without ever playing in college.

Third team

Player	Position	Height	School	Hometown	College	NBA draft
John Petty	F	6'5"	Mae Jemison	Huntsville, Alabama	**Alabama**	Has not yet declared for the NBA draft
Shai Gilgeous-Alexander	G	6'5"	Hamilton Heights Christian	Hamilton, Ontario	**Kentucky**	1st round – 11th pick in 2018 (Los Angeles Clippers)
Chris Lykes	G	5'6"	Gonzaga	Washington, D.C.	**Miami (FL)**	Has not yet declared for the NBA draft
Quade Green	G	6'1"	Neumann–Goretti	Philadelphia, Pennsylvania	**Kentucky**	Has not yet declared for the NBA draft
Lindell Wigginton	G	6'1"	Oak Hill Academy	Dartmouth, Nova Scotia	**Iowa State**	Undrafted

=== 2018 Boys' team ===
Coach of the year: Kevin Boyle, Monteverde, Montverde, Florida

First team

Player	Position	Height	School	Hometown	College	NBA draft
**RJ Barrett**	G	6'7"	Montverde Academy	Mississauga, Ontario	**Duke**	1st round – 3rd pick in 2019 (New York Knicks)
Tre Jones	G	6'2"	Apple Valley	Apple Valley, Minnesota	**Duke**	2nd round – 41st pick in 2020 (San Antonio Spurs)
Cam Reddish	F	6'7"	Westtown School	Norristown, Pennsylvania	**Duke**	1st round – 10th pick in 2019 (Atlanta Hawks)
Zion Williamson	F	6'6"	Spartanburg Day School	Spartanburg, SC	**Duke**	1st round – 1st pick in 2019 (New Orleans Pelicans)
Vernon Carey Jr.‡	F	6'10"	NSU University School	Miami, Florida	**Duke**	2nd round – 32nd pick in 2020 (Charlotte Hornets)

Second team

Player	Position	Height	School	Hometown	College	NBA draft
Coby White	G	6'4"	Greenfield School	Goldsboro, North Carolina	**North Carolina**	1st round – 7th pick in 2019 (Chicago Bulls)
Romeo Langford	G	6'5"	New Albany	New Albany, Indiana	**Indiana**	1st round – 14th pick in 2019 (Boston Celtics)
Keldon Johnson	F	6'6"	Oak Hill Academy	Chesterfield, Virginia	**Kentucky**	1st round – 29th pick in 2019 (San Antonio Spurs)
Jordan Brown	C	6'10"	Prolific Prep	Roseville, California	**Nevada**	Undrafted
Bol Bol	C	7'2"	Findlay Prep	Khartoum, Sudan	**Oregon**	2nd round – 44th pick in 2019 (Miami Heat)

Third team

Player	Position	Height	School	Hometown	College	NBA draft
Cole Anthony‡	G	6'3"	Archbishop Molloy	Portland, Oregon	**North Carolina**	1st round – 15th pick in 2020 (Orlando Magic)
Dane Goodwin	G	6'6"	Upper Arlington	Upper Arlington, Ohio	**Notre Dame**	Undrafted
Talen Horton-Tucker	F	6'5"	Simeon	Chicago, Illinois	**Iowa State**	2nd round – 46th pick in 2019 (Orlando Magic)
Nassir Little	F	6'7"	Orlando Christian Prep	Pensacola, Florida	**North Carolina**	1st round – 25th pick in 2019 (Portland Trail Blazers)
James Wiseman‡	C	7'1"	East	Nashville, Tennessee	**Memphis**	1st round – 2nd pick in 2020 (Golden State Warriors)

=== 2019 Boys' team ===
Coach of the year: Mike Thompson, McEachern, Powder Springs, Georgia

First team

Player	Position	Height	School	Hometown	College	NBA draft
Cole Anthony	G	6'3"	Oak Hill Academy	Portland, Oregon	**North Carolina**	1st round – 15th pick in 2020 (Orlando Magic)
Anthony Edwards	G	6'4"	Holy Spirit Prep	Atlanta, Georgia	**Georgia**	1st round – 1st pick in 2020 (Minnesota Timberwolves)
R. J. Hampton	G	6'5"	Little Elm	Dallas, Texas	**None**	1st round – 24th pick in 2020 (Milwaukee Bucks)
Isaiah Stewart	C	6'9"	La Lumiere School	Rochester, New York	**Washington**	1st round – 16th pick in 2020 (Portland Trail Blazers)
James Wiseman	C	7'1"	East	Nashville, Tennessee	**Memphis**	1st round – 2nd pick in 2020 (Golden State Warriors)

Second team

Player	Position	Height	School	Hometown	College	NBA draft
Vernon Carey Jr.	F	6'10"	NSU University School	Miami, Florida	**Duke**	2nd round – 32nd pick in 2020 (Charlotte Hornets)
Jalen Green‡	G	6'7"	San Joaquin Memorial	Merced, California	**None**	1st round – 2nd pick in 2021 (Houston Rockets)
Matthew Hurt	F	6'8"	John Marshall	Rochester, Minnesota	**Duke**	Undrafted
Nico Mannion	G	6'3"	Pinnacle	Siena, Italy	**Arizona**	2nd round – 48th pick in 2020 (Golden State Warriors)
Trendon Watford	F	6'8"	Mountain Brook	Birmingham, Alabama	**LSU**	Undrafted

Third team

Player	Position	Height	School	Hometown	College	NBA draft
Precious Achiuwa	F	6'9"	Montverde Academy	Port Harcourt, Nigeria	**Memphis**	1st round – 20th pick in 2020 (Miami Heat)
Greg Brown III‡	F	6'9"	Vandegrift	Dallas, Texas	**Texas**	2nd round – 43rd pick in 2021 (New Orleans Pelicans)
Joseph Girard III	G	6'1"	Glens Falls	Glens Falls, New York	**Syracuse**	Undrafted
Josh Green	G	6'6"	IMG Academy	Sydney, Australia	**Arizona**	1st round – 18th pick in 2020 (Dallas Mavericks)
Cassius Stanley	G	6'5"	Sierra Canyon	Los Angeles, California	**Duke**	2nd round – 54th pick in 2020 (Indiana Pacers)

=== 2020 Boys' team ===
(Missing)

=== 2021 Boys' team ===
(Missing)

=== 2022 Boys' team ===
(Missing)

=== 2023 Boys' team ===
(Missing)

=== 2024 Boys' team ===
(Missing)

=== 2025 Boys' team ===
(Missing)

=== 2026 Boys' team ===
First team

Player	Position	Height	School	Hometown	College	NBA draft
Jordan Smith Jr.	G	6'2"	Paul VI Catholic	Washington, D.C.	**Arkansas**	
Jason Crowe Jr.	G	6'4"	Inglewood	Inglewood, California	**Missouri**	
Brandon McCoy Jr.	G	6'5"	Sierra Canyon	Oakland, California	**Michigan**	
Tyran Stokes	F	6'7"	Rainier Beach	Louisville, Kentucky	**Kansas**	
Cameron Williams	C	7'0"	St. Mary's	Phoenix, Arizona	**Duke**	

Second team

Player	Position	Height	School	Hometown	College	NBA draft
Cayden Daughtry‡	G	6'1"	Calvary Christian Academy	Boynton Beach, Florida		
Quentin Coleman	G	6'4"	Principia School	O'Fallon, Illinois	**Illinois**	
Bryson Howard	F	6'4"	Heritage	Dallas, Texas	**Duke**	
Caleb Gaskins	F	6'8"	Christopher Columbus	West Palm Beach, Florida	**Miami**	
Latrell Allmond	C	6'8"	Petersburg	Southern Pines, North Carolina	**Oklahoma State**	

Third team

Player	Position	Height	School	Hometown	College	NBA draft
Caleb Holt	G	6'5"	Prolific Prep	New Market, Alabama	**Arizona**	
Miles Sadler	G	6'0"	Bella Vista	Brampton, Ontario	**West Virginia**	
Christian Collins	F	6'9"	St. John Bosco	Inglewood, California	**USC**	
Colben Landrew	F	6'6"	Wheeler	McComb, Mississippi	**UConn**	
Sam Funches	C	6'10"	Germantown	Madison, Mississippi	**Gonzaga**	

== See also ==
- List of U.S. high school basketball national player of the year awards
- USA Today All-USA High School Baseball Team (including Player and Coach of the Year)
- USA Today All-USA High School Football Team
- National High School Hall of Fame
