= Steve Smith (basketball coach) =

American basketball coach

Steve Smith is a retired American head coach for the basketball team at Oak Hill Academy in Mouth of Wilson, Virginia.

He is a 1977 graduate of Asbury College, a four-year Christian liberal arts college located in Wilmore, Kentucky, and holds an M.S. degree from Eastern Kentucky University. Coach Smith has been named USA Today National Coach of the Year four times (1994, 1999, 2004, 2012). Coach Smith’s Oak Hill Warriors were crowned "National High School Champions" nine times (1993, 1994, 1999, 2001, 2004, 2005, 2007, 2012, 2016). He has coached 32 McDonald's All-Americans and has had 34 former players go on to the NBA including 16 1st round picks.

Smith retired following the end of the 2021-22 high school basketball season. He retired with 1,231 career victories in 37 seasons at Oak Hill Academy.
