= Rosemont Elementary School District 78 =

School district in Illinois, United States

Address
- 6101 Ruby St Rosemont, Illinois, 60018; United States

District information
- Type: Public
- Grades: PreK–8
- NCES District ID: 1734770

Students and staff
- Students: 216

Other information
- Website: www.rosemont78.org

Rosemont Elementary School District 78 is a school district headquartered in Rosemont, Illinois in the Chicago metropolitan area. It operates a single school, Rosemont Elementary School. It is situated inside the gated residential area of the village.
